= Comparison of the 2008 United States presidential candidates =

Comparison of the US presidential candidates for the 2008 election

This article compares the presidential candidates in the United States' 2008 presidential election. It does not cover previous elections. Because of ballot access restrictions in the United States, not all candidates appeared on the ballots in all states.

== Candidates ==
Those who were on the ballot in enough states to theoretically win a majority in the U.S. Electoral College are marked in bold. Candidates who are known to have appeared on at least two states' ballots are marked in italic.

Presidential candidate	Party	Running mate	Campaign site
Gene Amondson	Prohibition	Leroy Pletten	geneamondson.com
**Chuck Baldwin** (campaign)	Constitution	**Darrell Castle**	baldwin2008.com
**Bob Barr** (campaign)	Libertarian	**Wayne Allyn Root**	bobbarr2008.com
Róger Calero	Socialist Workers	Alyson Kennedy	
Charles Jay	Boston Tea	Thomas L. Knapp	CJ08.com
Alan Keyes (campaign)	America's Independent Party	Brian Rohrbough	alankeyes.com
Gloria La Riva	Socialism & Liberation	Eugene Puryear	votepsl.org
**John McCain** (campaign)	Republican	**Sarah Palin**	johnmccain.com
Frank McEnulty	New American Independent	David Mangan	frankforpresident.org
**Cynthia McKinney** (campaign)	Green	**Rosa Clemente**	votetruth08.com
Brian Moore	Socialist, Liberty Union	Stewart Alexander	votesocialist2008.org
**Ralph Nader** (campaign)	Independent, Peace and Freedom	**Matt Gonzalez**	votenader.org
**Barack Obama** (campaign)	Democratic	**Joe Biden**	barackobama.com
Ron Paul (campaign)	Louisiana Taxpayers Party; Constitution Party of Montana	Barry Goldwater, Jr. Michael Peroutka	ronpaul2008.com
Thomas Stevens	Objectivist		
Ted Weill	Reform	Frank McEnulty	

== Biographical data ==
	John McCain	Barack Obama	Ralph Nader	Bob Barr	Chuck Baldwin	Cynthia McKinney
Gender	Male	Male	Male	Male	Male	Female
Age	72	47	74	59	56	53
Party	Republican Party	Democratic Party	Independent	Libertarian Party; Republican Party (former)	Constitution Party; Republican Party (former)	Green Party; Democratic Party (former)
Profession	U.S. Senator, U.S. Congressman, Businessman Naval Aviator	U.S. Senator, Attorney, Professor of Constitutional Law	Consumer advocate, lobbyist	Former U.S. Congressman, United States Attorney, CIA employee	Pastor, syndicated columnist and radio host	Former U.S. Congresswoman, high school teacher, and college professor
Undergraduate education	B.S. United States Naval Academy (The Naval Academy had a fixed curriculum and did not allow Midshipmen to pick a major)	B.A. Columbia University (Political Science, International Relations) 1983	B.A. Princeton University (East Asian Studies, International Relations) 1955	B.A. University of Southern California (International Relations) 1970	B.A. Liberty University	B.A. University of Southern California (International Relations)
Graduate education	National War College	J.D. Harvard Law (1991)	L.L.B. Harvard Law (1958)	M.A. George Washington University (International Relations) (1972), J.D. Georgetown University Law Center (1977)	Master's Degree in Theology Christian Bible College	M.A. Fletcher School of Law and Diplomacy at Tufts University (1982?); diplomatic fellow, Spelman College (1984); a PhD student at University of California, Berkeley
States/Countries lived in	Arizona, Florida, Panama Canal Zone, North Vietnam, Washington, D.C.	California, Hawaii, Illinois, Indonesia, Massachusetts, New York, Washington, D.C.	Connecticut, Washington, D.C.	California, Georgia, Iowa, Lima, Peru, Tehran, Iran, Washington, D.C.	Indiana, Florida, Virginia	Georgia, California
Last political office	U.S. Senator (1987–2018)	U.S. Senator (2005–2008)	None	U.S. Congressman (1995–2003)	None	U.S. Congresswoman (1993–2003, 2005–2007)
Other political experience	United States Congressman (1982–1986)	Illinois State Senator (1996–2004)	Consultant to Department of Labor (1964)	Region 4 Representative for the Libertarian National Committee (2006–2008), National Rifle Association Board Member,	Florida Chairman of Moral Majority (1980–1984), 2004 Constitution Party vice presidential nominee	Member of the Georgia House of Representatives, (1988–1992)
U.S. Senate committee memberships	Armed Services Committee; (Chairman of the) Commerce, Science and Transportation Committee; (Chairman of the) Indian Affairs Committee; Committee on POW/MIA Affairs	Health, Education, Labor, and Pensions, Foreign Relations; Homeland Security and Governmental Affairs; Veterans' Affairs	Advised auto safety subcommittee (1964)	None	None	None
U.S. House committee memberships	Committee on the Judiciary, Committee on Oversight and Government Reform, Committee on Financial Services	None	None	Committee on the Judiciary, Government Reform Committee, Committee on Financial Services, Committee on Veteran's Affairs	None	Committee on Interior Affairs, Committee on Armed Services; Subcommittee on Military Personnel; Subcommittee on Terrorism and Unconventional Threats, Committee on the Budget
Management/Corporate experience	Vice President of Public Relations for Hensley & Co.	President of the Harvard Law Review; Junior editor for Business International Corporation; Associate Lawyer of Davis, Miner, Barnhill & Galland	None	President of the Southeastern Legal Foundation	Founded/lead Crossroad Baptist Church, Pensacola (1975–)	
Teaching experience	Gave the 114th Landon Lecture on March 15, 1999, at Kansas State	Lecturer in Constitutional Law at the University of Chicago Law School (1993–2004)	Professor of History and Government (University of Hartford)	Adjunct professor teaching "Privacy and Public Policy in 21st century Business and Society" at Kennesaw State University (2008)	Pastor of Crossroad Baptist Church, Pensacola (1975–)	Earth Day Lecturer at CSU (2008)
Armed Forces experience	(1958–1981) Midshipman, US Naval Academy; Naval Aviator; Prisoner of War; Commander; Commanding Officer, VA-174 "Hellrazors"	None	US Army (1959)	None		None
Armed Forces awards	Silver Star, Legion of Merit, Bronze Star, Distinguished Flying Cross, Navy Commendation Medal and the National Order of Vietnam from South Vietnam	None	None	None		None
Net worth (with spouse)	$23–36 million (US$)	$10–16 million (US$)	$4 million (US$)			$50,000 (US$)
Spouse	Cindy Hensley McCain (m. 1980)	Michelle Obama (m. 1992)	None	Jeri Barr (m. 1986)	Connie Cole Baldwin (m. 1973)	None
Spouse's undergraduate education	B.A. in education, University of Southern California	B.A. in sociology, 1985, Princeton University	n/a	None		n/a
Spouse's graduate education	M.A. in Special Education, University of Southern California	J.D. in Law, 1988, Harvard Law School	n/a	None		n/a
Spouse's profession	High school teacher, businessperson, philanthropist	Attorney, executive	n/a	Numerous positions in Cobb, Georgia		n/a

== Economic issues ==
=== Tax policy ===
Projected Federal income tax changes in 2009 assuming all tax proposals were adopted by congress and the budget remains the same. Yellow is for the projected tax change most favorable to people in that income bracket.
	John McCain	Barack Obama
Income	Average tax bill	Average tax bill
Over $2.9M	−$269,364	+$701,885
$603K and up	−$45,361	+$115,974
$227K–$603K	−$7,871	+$12
$161K–$227K	−$4,380	−$2,789
$112K–$161K	−$2,614	−$2,204
$66K–$112K	−$1,009	−$1,290
$38K–$66K	−$319	−$1,042
$19K–$38K	−$113	−$892
Under $19K	−$19	−$567
CNN, Tax Policy Center, BarackObama.com, and JohnMcCain.com

The third-party candidates' tax plans were not studied by mainstream media outlets and the Tax Policy Center. Chuck Baldwin supports replacing the income tax with a 10% across-the-board tariff on imported goods. Bob Barr supports replacing the income tax with a consumption tax (the FairTax). The details of his exact plan are not known but consumption taxes tend to be regressive unless accompanied by a negative income tax for the poor to offset necessary expenditures. Cynthia McKinney supports sharply progressive taxation, with higher taxes for the rich and a tax cut for the middle class.

=== 2008 financial crisis and bailout ===
John McCain	Barack Obama
Supported bailout	Supported bailout
Bob Barr	Cynthia McKinney
Opposed bailout. Barr will seek to limit policies that permit political interference in the economy in favor of the exercise of a free-market economic model. This would include: formally and clearly end the bailouts which promote private economic retrenchment and corporate work-outs; limiting powers of the government to place sustained federal pressure to increase mortgage lending, through Freddie Mac and Fannie Mae; amending or revoking the Community Reinvestment Act; limiting the ability of the Federal Reserve to manipulate the currency for political purposes; Ensuring enforcement of the SEC regulations to insure solvency and transparency in the operation of major investment firms; Permanently lowering tax rates and simplifying taxes to more effectively reinforce long-term plans for hiring, inventory and production; cutting environmental rules such as Corporate Average Fuel Economy standards on vehicles; initiating a detailed audit of federal rules, relaxing or eliminating any regulations for which costs outweigh benefits; reducing penalties on people for delayed tax payments and premature withdrawals from IRAs; ending nonessential federal spending, particularly frivolous special interest outlays; Over the longer term, evaluate, plan, and implement for future federal liabilities and obligations—FDIC bank guarantees, Pension Benefit Guaranty Corporation promises, Social Security and Medicare liabilities, and more.	Opposed $700 billion bailout to Wall Street. Instead offered a 14-point proposal which included a moratorium on foreclosures; elimination of all ARM mortgages and their renegotiation into 30- or 40-year loans; the establishment of new mortgage lending practices to end predatory and discriminatory practices; the establishment of criteria and construction goals for affordable housing; a redefinition of credit and regulation of the credit industry so that discriminatory practices are eliminated; full funding for initiatives that eliminate racial and ethnic disparities in home ownership; recognition of shelter as a right according to the UN Declaration of Human Rights; targeting of funds to cushion job loss and provide for retraining of those at the bottom of the income scale as the economy transitions; the closure all tax loopholes and repeal of the Bush tax cuts for the top 1% of income earners; fair taxation of corporations, denial of federal subsidies to those who relocate jobs overseas repeal NAFTA; the appointment of former Comptroller General David Walker to fully audit all recipients of taxpayer cash infusions, including JP Morgan, Bear Stearns, Fannie Mae, Freddie Mac, and AIG, and to monitor their trading activities into the future; the elimination of all derivatives trading; the nationalization of the Federal Reserve; and the establishment of a federally owned, public banking system that makes credit available for small businesses, homeowners, manufacturing operations, renewable energy and infrastructure investments; and criminally prosecute any activities that violated the law, including conflicts of interest that led to the current crisis.
Chuck Baldwin	Ralph Nader
Opposed bailout.	Ralph Nader opposed the bailout, suggesting that derivatives transactions be taxed instead.

=== Trade ===
John McCain		Barack Obama	
McCain is a strong proponent of free trade. He supports the North American Free Trade Agreement (NAFTA), the existing General Agreement on Tariffs and Trade, and U.S. participation in the World Trade Organization (WTO). He opposes including labor and environmental conditions to trade agreements.		Obama supports expanding trade only if the United States' trade partners place labor and environmental standards on their industries to "level the playing field" for American interests. If elected president, Obama plans to renegotiate NAFTA to include stricter labor and environmental standards for Canada and Mexico. He has criticized the current agreement for not including such standards, and he also voted against and criticized the Central America Free Trade Agreement (CAFTA) for similar reasons.	
Chuck Baldwin	Bob Barr	Cynthia McKinney	Ralph Nader
Baldwin would lead the US out of the North American and the Central America Free Trade Agreements. He would impose a revenue tariff.	Barr's campaign site states that America "should encourage private involvement around the world, particularly through free trade. The most effective way to preserve peace is through an expanding free market, backed by a full range of cultural and other private relationships".	McKinney stresses enacting laws on US corporations to keep labor standards high at home and raise them abroad. She would repeal NAFTA (North American Free Trade Agreement), CAFTA, the Caribbean FTA, and US-Peru FTA. She opposes the guest-worker program as riddled with abuses; supports justice for immigrant workers, and immigrant reform that includes amnesty and a path to legalization for undocumented people who have been living and working in the US for years.	Nader views NAFTA and the WTO as subverting national regulatory agencies. He blames them for diminishing standards of living (i.e. race to the bottom). Nader supports a constitutional amendment asserting the "sovereignty of people over the power of corporations."

=== Health care ===
John McCain		Barack Obama	
McCain favors tax credits of up to $5,000 for families that purchase health insurance. "We do not believe in coercion and the use of state power to mandate care, coverage or costs." His plan would reduce the number of uninsured by 1 million by 2009 and 5 million by 2013, while raising the national debt by $1.3 trillion over 10 years, according to one estimate.		Obama's health care plan includes implementing guaranteed eligibility for affordable health care for all Americans. His plan would reduce the number of uninsured by 18 million by 2009 and 34 million by 2018, covering nearly all children, while raising the national debt by $1.6 trillion over 10 years, according to one estimate.	
Chuck Baldwin	Bob Barr	Cynthia McKinney	Ralph Nader
Believes in supplying better health care to America's veterans. Supports freedom of choice, opposes compulsory vaccination.	Wants to cut costs by reducing controls and regulations. Believes Medicare and Medicaid are financially unstable, and "need to be transformed to emphasize patient choice, focus on the truly needy, and add cost-saving incentives."	Co-sponsored every bill in Congress to create a system of universal health care under a single payer model. Opposes forced, coerced, or uninformed medication and sterilization; believes Americans should be able to purchase drugs from other countries if the price is cheaper, and the U.S. should negotiate with drug companies to provide cheaper drugs for all U.S. residents.	Nader supports a universal single-payer health care system and full Medicare for everyone.

=== Taxation and budget deficit ===
John McCain		Barack Obama	
While McCain has more often favored deficit reduction over tax cuts, he supports both, and has pledged not to rescind recent tax cuts in combination with reduced spending. McCain believes that lower taxes will stimulate the economy, and that the current deficit owes more to overspending than to tax cuts. McCain plans to balance the budget by the end of his first term. According to the Tax Policy Center, McCain's tax plans (by extending the Bush tax cuts and cutting corporate tax rates from 35% to 25% to increase investment, among other measures), would increase the national debt by nearly $5 trillion over 10 years, a nearly 50% increase.		Obama advocates responding to the "precarious budget situation" by eliminating "tax credits that have outlived their usefulness", closing corporate tax loopholes, and restoring the PAYGO policy that prohibits increases in federal spending without a way to compensate for the lost revenue. Obama proposes extending the Bush tax cuts for low- and middle-income families, while letting taxes go back up for individuals earning over $200,000 or couples earning over $250,000.	
Chuck Baldwin	Bob Barr	Cynthia McKinney	Ralph Nader
Baldwin would work to repeal the Sixteenth Amendment (income tax), inheritance taxes, and property taxes. "We are bankrupting our country with this incessant and burdensome tax system."	Barr supports repealing the Sixteenth Amendment and mentions the Fair Tax as a possible alternative. "Meaningful tax reform begins with reining in government spending."	Would repeal Bush tax cuts for top 1% of income earners; close tax loopholes; tax corporations more; and deny federal subsidies to those who relocate jobs overseas. Proposes to regain control of the monetary system and respond to the 2008 financial crisis, by steps that include a moratorium on foreclosures; elimination of all ARM mortgages and their renegotiation into 30- or 40-year loans; establishment of new mortgage lending practices to end predatory and discriminatory practices; funds targeted at cushioning job loss and retraining of those at the bottom of the income scale as the economy transitions; appointment of former Comptroller General David Walker to fully audit all recipients of taxpayer cash infusions, including JP Morgan, Bear Stearns, Fannie Mae, Freddie Mac, and AIG, and to monitor their trading activities into the future; elimination of all derivatives trading; nationalization of the Federal Reserve and the establishment of a federally owned, public banking system that makes credit available for small businesses, homeowners, manufacturing operations, renewable energy, and infrastructure investments; criminal prosecution of any conflicts of interest that led to the current crisis.	Nader opposes corporate welfare and seeks to end corporate loopholes, exemptions, credits, accelerated depreciation schedules, deductions, and targeted exceptions. He would balance the national budget by cutting military spending by $100 billion, or about a fifth, and through sharply progressive taxation.

=== Social Security ===
John McCain		Barack Obama	
In June 1999, McCain said "The only way to increase the yield on Social Security dollars is by allowing workers to make investment decisions for themselves; by empowering American families to invest, in most robust portfolios, a portion of their earnings for Social Security that they would otherwise pay in taxes to Social Security." In January 2000, he repeated his strong support for creating private Social Security accounts. Partial privatization, or diverting payroll taxes to private accounts, would reduce available funds for current retirees significantly, requiring large debt increases to cover the transition.		Obama has said that Social Security's funding problem is "real but manageable." He has proposed to fund Social Security by applying payroll taxes to individual income above $250,000 per year, and says that these high-income earners should "pay their fair share." When asked if he would consider raising the retirement age or cutting benefits, Obama did not rule these approaches out entirely, saying, "everything should be on the table." However, he has said that he would not push for either of those approaches, and says that an increase in tax revenue is necessary to stabilize the system. Obama opposes adding personal accounts to Social Security.	
Chuck Baldwin	Bob Barr	Cynthia McKinney	Ralph Nader
Phase out Social Security.	Social security is not sustainable. Social Security should be changed to an "individualized system of private accounts."	McKinney strongly opposes privatizing Social Security, and recognizes cuts disproportionately harm women. She believes tax payments on benefits should be reduced, and benefits increased.	Nader views Social Security as "government as it should work – a coming together of society to ensure that we, as a community, take care of each other as we age or suffer from disabilities." Nader opposes a privatized system that would replace "systemic tranquility with an enforced anxiety". He says people are already able to take risk in the stock market through IRAs, 401Ks and other tax-subsidized private retirement devices.

=== Network neutrality ===
John McCain		Barack Obama	
McCain is against government regulation of network neutrality unless evidence of abuse exists. He is quoted in May 2007 as saying, "let's see how this thing all turns out, rather than anticipate a problem that so far has not arisen in any significant way," and, "When you control the pipe you should be able to get profit from your investment."		Obama is "a strong supporter of Net neutrality," saying that regulations are required to prevent the telecom companies from changing "the internet as we know it." Promoting net neutrality would be a priority in his first year as president.	
Chuck Baldwin	Bob Barr	Cynthia McKinney	Ralph Nader
		In June, 2006 McKinney voted for network neutrality.	Strongly supports net neutrality.

=== Lobbying ===
John McCain		Barack Obama	
McCain does not allow his staffers to hold positions as lobbyists.		Obama does not take contributions from federally registered lobbyists or PACs, though he does accept money from non-federal lobbyists and unregistered lobbyists.	
Chuck Baldwin	Bob Barr	Cynthia McKinney	Ralph Nader
			At the beginning of his campaign, Nader stated that he "will receive no money from commercial interests, no money from political action committees, only from individuals." He sees Washington D.C. as "corporate-occupied territory, every department agency controlled by overwhelming presence of corporate lobbyists, corporate executives in high government positions." He supports public financing of campaigns and free TV and radio time for ballot qualified candidates.

=== Transportation ===
John McCain		Barack Obama	
McCain is opposed to federal funding of Amtrak. He considers it to be a "pork barrel project", particularly as far as longer distance trains are concerned. He has also argued for more stringent safety standards with respect to cars.			
Chuck Baldwin	Bob Barr	Cynthia McKinney	Ralph Nader
		Supports increased funding for public transit using alternative fuel technologies.	Nader was instrumental in the unanimous passage of the 1966 National Traffic and Motor Vehicle Safety Act.

=== Labor ===
John McCain		Barack Obama	
John McCain voted for the Family and Medical Leave Act of 1993 which granted workers the right to take 12 weeks of unpaid leave for family medical reasons without being penalized by their employer. McCain sponsored the Family Friendly Workplace Act which sought to allow employers to provide more flexible work schedules to help balance work and family.			
Chuck Baldwin	Bob Barr	Cynthia McKinney	Ralph Nader
Impose a revenue tariff on all foreign goods to keep jobs in America.		Wants to repeal the anti-union Taft-Hartley Act. Supports full employment and a living wage for all workers. Supports justice for immigrant workers, and opposes guest-worker programs as riddled with abuses. Opposes 'free trade' agreements and unelected international trade authorities (NAFTA, CAFTA, WTO, GATT, 'Fast Track', etc.) that give corporate power and profit priority over labor rights and environmental protections; McKinney has voted against these agreements and advocates withdrawal. Human rights protections and amnesty for undocumented immigrants, an end to raids, and tearing down the border wall; believes the flood of new immigrants is a result of economic policies and agreements (e.g., NAFTA) that impoverish people and drive them across borders, and that immigration should be addressed by fixing these policies while ensuring worker rights and right to organize. Favors a strong safety net for middle- and low-income working people and families, with support for Main Street (small businesses and local economies) instead of Wall Street, and a massive transfer of federal funding from military contract and war spending to human needs.	Nader promises to repeal the Taft-Hartley Act. He supports an increase in the minimum wage to $10 an hour to give low-wage workers "a fair return for their work". Nader supports family farms and opposes large agribusiness. He is credited with helping pass the Mine Health and Safety Act (1977), Whistleblower Protection Act (1989), and OSHA (1970) – all three are fundamental to modern labor protection.

=== Monetary policy ===
John McCain		Barack Obama	
Chuck Baldwin	Bob Barr	Cynthia McKinney	Ralph Nader
Baldwin would eliminate the Federal Reserve and move the US from fiat currency back to hard money.	"Congress must insist on accountability and transparency in the Federal Reserve's operation, while reconsidering the Fed's almost total control over the money supply."		

=== NASA and space exploration ===
John McCain		Barack Obama	
John McCain sponsored legislation to support the commercial space industry and led the Senate's efforts to implement improvements to NASA after the Columbia accident. McCain pledged that as president he would ensure that space exploration is top priority and that the U.S. remains a leader and is committed to funding the NASA Constellation program to ensure it has the resources it needs to begin a new era of human space exploration.		"As president, Obama will support the development of this vital new platform Crew Exploration Vehicle to ensure that the United States' reliance on foreign space capabilities is limited to the minimum possible time period."	
Chuck Baldwin	Bob Barr	Cynthia McKinney	Ralph Nader

== Foreign policy ==
=== Arab–Israeli conflict ===
John McCain		Barack Obama	
In a speech to the American Israel Public Affairs Committee on April 23, 2002, McCain said that "no American leader should be expected to sell a false peace to our ally, consider Israel's right to self-defense less legitimate than ours, or insist that Israel negotiate a political settlement while terrorism remains the Palestinians' preferred bargaining tool."		Obama supports a two-state solution. Referring to the Israeli–Palestinian conflict in January 2006, Obama denounced Hamas while praising former Israeli Prime Minister Ariel Sharon. At a meeting with then Israeli Foreign Minister Silvan Shalom on the eve of Hamas' sweeping election victory, Obama stated that Sharon's role in the conflict had always been "absolutely important and constructive."	
Chuck Baldwin	Bob Barr	Cynthia McKinney	Ralph Nader
		US should stop weapons transfers to Middle East countries, including Israel—and be "honest broker." In terms of two- versus one-state solution, would listen to the voices and human rights advocates who are there.	Nader supports the Israeli peace movement and views resolution of the Israeli–Palestinian conflict as central to national security. Nader was critical of the US-supported bombing of Lebanon in 2006, seeing it as collective punishment. Nader wants enforcement of UN resolutions concerning Israel and a peaceful two-state solution.

=== Iraq ===
John McCain		Barack Obama	
McCain supported the invasion of Iraq and has stated that he would keep troops in Iraq for as long as needed, dependent on agreement from the Iraqi government. "It's not a matter of how long we're in Iraq, it's if we succeed or not." John McCain was an early supporter of the Surge.		Obama opposed the Iraq war as early as 2002 and has pledged a responsible, phased withdrawal. Obama was a strong opponent of the Surge and up until July 2008, he continued to call it a failure, in spite of a general consensus that the surge had been a success. and he wrote and introduced the Iraq War De-Escalation Act of 2007 which would have stopped the Surge and started to pull American troops out of Iraq in 2007. He continues to criticize the Surge because he says it has not achieved political reconciliation, has overtaxed the military and diverted focus from Afghanistan and Pakistan, which he considers to be the central front in the war on terror.	
Chuck Baldwin	Bob Barr	Cynthia McKinney	Ralph Nader
Baldwin has stated that the US's involvement in Iraq is clearly unconstitutional as well as unnecessary, and would begin safely withdrawing troops.	Barr considers the invasion and occupation of Iraq to have been mistakes. American presence "emboldens both insurgents and terrorists", and has cost "hundreds of billions of U.S. taxpayer dollars." He supports "withdrawal without undue delay."	McKinney calls for the immediate and orderly withdrawal of all US troops and contracted personnel from Iraq and Afghanistan; she would dismantle US military bases in the area, and demand that US and other international corporations relinquish any claims to Iraqi oil or other resources. She has consistently opposed funding for the war and the military budget.	Nader opposes the US occupation of Iraq on the grounds that "it's the occupation that is breeding the resistance." He supports a "responsible, orderly withdrawal" within six months. Following withdrawal, he supports inclusion of an international peacekeeping force under UN auspices, promotion of Iraqi self-rule through independent elections, and the providing of humanitarian aid to stabilize the country.

=== Iran ===
John McCain		Barack Obama	
John McCain called the crisis with Iran "the most serious crisis we have faced – outside of the entire war on terror – since the end of the Cold War." "Nuclear capability in Iran is unacceptable," said McCain. McCain criticized Russia and China for causing "gridlock" in the UN Security Council and preventing the sanctioning of Iran as well as other areas of conflict such as Darfur and Burma. If elected, McCain pledges to create a "league of democracies" with the purpose of addressing those conflicts without the approval of China and Russia.		Obama stated he regards Iran's government as "a threat to all of us," stating that the US "should take no option, including military action, off the table. Sustained and aggressive diplomacy combined with tough sanctions should be our primary means to prevent Iran from building nuclear weapons."	
Chuck Baldwin	Bob Barr	Cynthia McKinney	Ralph Nader
	Has stated that "an attack on Iran would be unnecessary, counterproductive, costly and dangerous", that "[t]here is no imminent threat, and only an imminent threat can ever justify a preemptive strike", and concludes "any nonproliferation strategy must begin with diplomacy and include a willingness to address the other side".	McKinney believes we must leave behind the militarization that has accompanied the Bush administration. She supports leaving Iraq and moving toward peaceful methods of dealing with other countries.	Nader believes the US must stop "saber rattling" with Iran and take up Iran's proposal in 2003 to negotiate all outstanding issues between the US and Iran.

=== Darfur ===
John McCain		Barack Obama	
McCain called upon the United States to reject Sudan's demand that the AU peacekeeping force leave or be bullied. McCain believes that America must convince our allies in the region and friendly Arab nations to abandon their support for Sudan and force them to accept more peacekeepers. On a more immediate time-frame McCain called for the use of NATO air-power to establish a no-fly zone and the use of intelligence assets to gather evidence of genocide and build cases against its perpetrators.		In a December 2005 opinion column in The Washington Post, and at the Save Darfur rally in April 2006, Obama called for more assertive action to oppose genocide in the Darfur region of Sudan. He has divested $180,000 in personal holdings of Sudan-related stock, and has urged divestment from companies doing business in Iran.	
Chuck Baldwin	Bob Barr	Cynthia McKinney	Ralph Nader
		Expressed concern that atrocities in Darfur might be used to justify US occupation of Sudan.	Nader believes the US could do more to end the genocide in Darfur. He would refuse normalized relations with the Government of Sudan "until the Sudanese government removes all obstacles to the full deployment of the multilateral UNAMID, fully implements the CPA, and engages in good faith in a comprehensive, open and inclusive peace process."

=== Nuclear weapons ===
John McCain		Barack Obama	
McCain voted in favor of the Nunn-Lugar Cooperative Threat Reduction in 1991. He voted to ratify the START II strategic arms limitation treaty in 1996. McCain voted against the Comprehensive Nuclear-Test-Ban Treaty in 1999. In March 2008, McCain said that United States should reduce its nuclear arsenal to encourage other nations to reduce their arsenals.		Obama has spoken out against nuclear proliferation. According to his campaign website, Obama will "crack down on nuclear proliferation by strengthening the Nuclear Non-Proliferation Treaty." Obama has also vowed to stop the development of new American nuclear arms, pursuing an ultimate goal of "a world without nuclear weapons."	
Chuck Baldwin	Bob Barr	Cynthia McKinney	Ralph Nader
		McKinney supports the reduction of nuclear weapons in the U.S. and is a strong supporter of the Comprehensive Nuclear-Test-Ban Treaty, Nuclear Non-Proliferation Treaty and Anti-Ballistic Missile Treaty. She also wants to ban the manufacture and use of depleted uranium.	Nader describes nuclear weapons as "horrifying" and supports the Nuclear Non-Proliferation Treaty. He would adopt a no-first use policy, take all nuclear missiles off "hair-trigger" alert, and push for ratification of the START II and Comprehensive Test Ban Treaty as well as working with other nuclear states towards the eventual abolition of Nuclear weapons.

=== North Korea ===
John McCain		Barack Obama	
In October 2006, McCain said that he believed the former President Bill Clinton and his administration were to blame for the North Korea's weapons of mass destruction. He said that the U.S. had "concluded an unenforceable and untransparent agreement", allowing North Korea to keep plutonium rods in a reactor.			
Chuck Baldwin	Bob Barr	Cynthia McKinney	Ralph Nader

=== Pakistan ===
John McCain		Barack Obama	
McCain maintains a relatively moderate stance concerning Pakistan, although he has recognized the South Asian nation as an important part of US Foreign Policy. In the aftermath of Pakistan's former Prime Minister Benazir Bhutto's assassination (in December 2007) McCain appeared to rule out the option of US forces entering Pakistan, saying that it was not an appropriate time to "threaten" Pakistan.		On August 1, 2007, Obama declared in a foreign policy speech that the United States must be willing to strike al Qaeda targets inside Pakistan, with or without the consent of the Pakistani government. He claimed that if elected, "If we have actionable intelligence about high value terrorist targets and President Musharraf won't act, we will".	
Chuck Baldwin	Bob Barr	Cynthia McKinney	Ralph Nader
		"Free and fair elections, not U.S. troops, are the best strategy for achieving peace and stability in Pakistan." is the belief of Cynthia McKinney in Pakistan. She also opposes a United States war with Pakistan.	Nader has said that military action against Pakistan is off the table.

=== Extrajudicial prisoners ===
John McCain		Barack Obama	
In October 2005, McCain, a former POW, introduced the McCain Detainee Amendment to the Defense Appropriations bill for 2005. That month, the U.S. Senate voted 90–9 to support the amendment. In October 2007, McCain said of waterboarding that, "They [other presidential candidates] should know what it is. It is not a complicated procedure. It is torture." However, in February 2008 he voted against HR 2082, the Intelligence Authorization Act for Fiscal Year 2008, which included provisions that would have prevented the CIA from waterboarding prisoners.		Obama voted against the Military Commissions Act of 2006 and later voted to restore habeas corpus to those detained by the U.S. (which had been stripped by the Military Commissions Act). He has advocated closing the Guantanamo Bay detention camp, but has not supported two specific bills that would have done so. Obama opposes the use of torture.	
Chuck Baldwin	Bob Barr	Cynthia McKinney	Ralph Nader
			Nader views CIA kidnapping and extraordinary rendition as leading to diminished respect around the world. "Constitutional crimes against due process, probable cause, habeas corpus, together with torture and indefinite imprisonment... will worsen and erode American jurisprudence with serious consequences for both the nation's security and its liberties."

=== Armenian genocide ===
John McCain		Barack Obama	
At a town hall meeting January 6, 2008 McCain was reported to have answered a question on the Armenian genocide by noting that he recognizes the Armenian genocide, but opposes the Armenian Genocide Resolution due to the Turkish government's sensitivities and the importance of their continued contribution to the war on terror. On September 29, 2008, in an open letter to the Armenian-American Community of the United States he stated, that "it is fair to say that one of the greatest tragedies of the 20th century, the brutal murder of as many as one and a half million Armenians under the rule of the Ottoman Empire, has also been one of the most neglected" and that "it is our responsibility to recognize those tragic events".		On January 19, 2008, Obama announced that as a U.S. Senator, he has stood with the Armenian American community in calling for Turkey's acknowledgement of the Armenian genocide, and supports its recognition. In 2006, Obama criticized Secretary of State Condoleezza Rice for firing United States Ambassador to Armenia, John Evans, after he used the term "genocide" to describe Turkey's killing of hundreds of thousands of Armenians. In June 2008 Obama restated his commitment to U.S. recognition of the Armenian genocide in a letter to ANCA Chairman Ken Hachikian. Obama supported House Resolution 106 which recognized the killings as genocide.	
Chuck Baldwin	Bob Barr	Cynthia McKinney	Ralph Nader

=== China ===
John McCain		Barack Obama	
John McCain believes America should continue to work to secure an independent Taiwan and opposes the ability of corporations owned by the Chinese People's Liberation Army to make financial contributions to American political campaigns.			
Chuck Baldwin	Bob Barr	Cynthia McKinney	Ralph Nader
China is a potential military threat, and economic policies toward it weaken key American industries.			

=== Foreign aid ===
John McCain		Barack Obama	
Though John McCain plans to expand foreign aid, specifically targeting malaria in Africa, he has expressed concern that too much American aid money is embezzled or outright stolen by corrupt foreign governments.		Obama would double foreign aid to $50 billion by 2012.	
Chuck Baldwin	Bob Barr	Cynthia McKinney	Ralph Nader
Baldwin believes that the U.S. is not the world's policeman, and would end all foreign aid and interventionist policies.	"[F]oreign aid has proved to be a drain on the U.S. economy while doing little good for the recipients. Aid is routinely used by corrupt foreign governments to oppress their people and enrich powerful elites. Foreign aid almost always discourages economic and political reform, while subsidizing nations which often work against U.S. interests."		

=== Georgia ===
John McCain		Barack Obama	
John McCain said that it was critical to avoid further confrontation between Russian and Georgian forces. McCain wanted to work with the EU and the OSCE to pressure Russia to withdraw from all sovereign Georgian territory.			
Chuck Baldwin	Bob Barr	Cynthia McKinney	Ralph Nader

=== United Nations ===
John McCain		Barack Obama	
John McCain stated that the oil-for-food scandal and perennial failure to uphold Human Rights had demonstrated a "crying need for reform" in the UN.			
Chuck Baldwin	Bob Barr	Cynthia McKinney	Ralph Nader
Baldwin would withdraw the US from the United Nations, perceiving it to be a threat to American sovereignty.	Barr calls the United Nations "an enormous disappointment" and asserts that "[t]he U.S. should push to roll back the UN's functions and slash America's financial contribution".		

== Energy and environmental issues ==
=== The environment ===
John McCain	Barack Obama
McCain's stances on global warming and other environmental issues have often put him at odds with the Bush administration and other Republicans. For example, he has generally opposed drilling in the Arctic National Wildlife Refuge. According to the League of Conservation Voters' 2006 National Environmental Scorecard, McCain took an "anti-environment" stance on four of seven environmental resolutions during the second session of the 109th congress. The four resolutions dealt with issues such as offshore drilling, an Arctic national wildlife refuge, low-income energy assistance, and environmental funding. McCain's measures to lower auto emissions include higher fines for not complying with CAFE standards, calling for a level playing field for all alcohol-based biofuels, issuing a Clean Car Challenge to automakers (a US$5,000 tax credit for each and every customer who buys a zero-emissions car) and awarding a substantial prize to the auto company that develops a next-generation car battery.	Obama has a 'New Energy for America' plan and he has pledged to cut greenhouse gas emissions 80 percent below 1990 levels by 2050 by forcing a market-based cap-and-trade system, recommitting federal resources to public mass transportation and carbon sequestration (incentives to plant trees, restore grasslands or undertake farming practices). Obama also has plans for improving air and water quality through reduced carbon emissions. Obama worked as a member of the US Senate Committee on Environment and Public Works during the 109th Congress. At least 30 percent of federal government's electricity would come from renewable sources by 2020. Also, he wants to create a 'Global Energy Forum' of the largest energy consuming nations (G8+5). The League of Conservation Voters has given Obama the highest lifetime rating of anyone currently running for president.
Bob Barr	Cynthia McKinney
Barr pledges to eliminate restrictions that inhibit energy production, as well as all special privileges for the production of politically favored fuels, such as ethanol; supports the exploration and production of America's abundant domestic resources, including oil in the Outer Continental Shelf and Arctic National Wildlife Refuge, and alternative sources such as oil shale, which would lower costs to the consumer and assure more adequate and consistent supplies.	McKinney plans to create a cap on production and consumption as well as add organic farming, sustainability, and GM to the current Farm Bill. She also plans to assess toxic levels after Hurricane Katrina and Hurricane Rita. She voted yes on further Amtrak funding and no on changing the Endangered Species Act of 1973. She also voted down a bill that allowed commercial logging on public land.
Ralph Nader	Chuck Baldwin
Nader is credited with helping the Clean Air Act (1970) and Safe Drinking Water Act (1974). He was one of the first public figures to advocate renewable energy during the 1970s. Nader supports mandatory standards for recycling and precycling, especially in areas of government control.

=== Energy ===
John McCain		Barack Obama	
McCain gave a major speech on his energy policy at the Center for Strategic and International Studies. He connected energy independence with national security, climate change, and the environment. McCain proposed increasing ethanol imports and moving from exploration to production of plug-in hybrid electric vehicles. He said that US dependence on foreign oil is "a major strategic vulnerability, a serious threat to our security, our economy and the well being of our planet." He is co-sponsor of a Senate cap-and-trade bill designed to limit greenhouse gas emissions, and is seen as a bipartisan leader on the issue. McCain supports the increased use of nuclear energy in the US and reduce renewable sources to produce electricity. He has promoted the expanded use of nuclear power, calling for 45 new nuclear reactors to be built by 2030.		Obama has presented a 'New Energy for America' plan to achieve a low carbon economy, subsidizing 5 million new green jobs. He proposes $150 billion over 10 years to accelerate the commercialization of plug-in hybrids, promote development of commercial scale renewable energy (establishing a 100% federal RPS to require that 10 percent of electricity be derived from renewable sources by 2012 and 25% in 2025), encourage energy efficiency, advance the next generation of biofuels (requiring 60 billion US gallons (230,000,000 m^{3}) by 2030) and fuel infrastructure, and begin transition to a new digital electricity grid (smart metering, demand response, distributed generation and electricity storage systems). He also plans to reduce overall U.S. oil consumption by at least 35%, or 10 million barrels (1,600,000 m^{3}) per day, by 2030 to offset imports from OPEC nations. Obama and other senators introduced the BioFuels Security Act in 2006. Regarding the domestic use of nuclear power, Obama declared himself flatly opposed to building a nuclear waste repository in Nevada and has called for the facility's closure. However, Obama voted for the Energy Policy Act of 2005, which allocated $4.3 billion in tax credits to the nuclear energy sector. Obama and other senators introduced a bill in 2007 to promote the development of commercially viable plug-in hybrids and other electric-drive vehicles in order to shift away from petroleum fuels and "toward much cleaner – and cheaper – electricity for transportation". In his plan, related with transportation, he proposes increase fuel economy standards 4 percent per each year, specific focus on R&D in advanced battery technology and a $7,000 tax credit for the purchase of advanced technology vehicles as well as conversion tax credits and $4 billion retooling tax credits and loan guarantees for domestic auto plants and parts manufacturers; the entire White House fleet would be converted to plug-ins and half of cars purchased by the federal government will be plug-in (hybrids or all-electric) vehicles by 2012.	
Chuck Baldwin	Bob Barr	Cynthia McKinney	Ralph Nader
Would dissolve the Department of Energy. Believes in American energy independence by repealing prohibitions on domestic oil drilling, oil refineries, and nuclear plants.	Says the free market needs to be the foundation of the United States' energy policy. Supports drilling in the Arctic National Wildlife Refuge.	McKinney wants to leave Alaskan oil in the ground, declare the U.S. carbon-free and nuclear-free, and implement the Kyoto Treaty. She has voted no on scheduling permitting for new oil refineries and authorizing construction of new oil refineries. She has voted yes on keeping moratorium on drilling for oil offshore, raising CAFE standards; incentives for alternative fuels, prohibiting oil drilling development in ANWR, and starting implementation of Kyoto Protocol.	Nader is a strong supporter of solar energy and wants to end government subsidies for the fossil fuel and nuclear energy industries. He says "technologies are way ahead of the political framework" and envisions a "massive conversion from a hydrocarbon-based economy to a carbohydrate-based economy" within 20 to 25 years. He opposes corn ethanol "which has a very poor net energy and water-usage characteristic" in favor of cellulosic ethanol. He says that cap-and-trade programs "can be easily manipulated" and wants to tax inefficient technology and pollution at the production source.

== Domestic issues ==
=== Judiciary ===
John McCain		Barack Obama	
John McCain voted for the appointment of Justice Roberts. McCain favors a more Constructionist standpoint and says he would work to safeguard against Judicial activism.		Barack Obama was 1 of 22 senators to vote against the appointment of Justice Roberts.	
Chuck Baldwin	Bob Barr	Cynthia McKinney	Ralph Nader

=== Same-sex marriage ===
John McCain		Barack Obama	
In 2004, McCain voted against the Federal Marriage Amendment, arguing that each state should be able to choose whether to recognize same-sex marriages. He supported the 2006 Arizona initiative to ban same-sex marriage.		Obama voted against the Federal Marriage Amendment which would have defined marriage as between one man and one woman, but personally believes that marriage is a religious bond between a man and a woman. He supports civil unions for same-sex couples which would be same-sex marriage in all but name, but believes that decisions about the name marriage should be left to the states.	
Chuck Baldwin	Bob Barr	Cynthia McKinney	Ralph Nader
Baldwin believes marriage is between a man and a woman and supports the DOMA.	Barr opposes any federal definition of marriage, whether by statute or constitutional amendment. He believes the states should be free to determine what constitutes marriage.	Supports homosexual adoption and has a HRC 80 rating on gay rights issues.	Nader opposes DOMA and the military's Don't Ask Don't Tell policy. He says, "We've got to get rid of this discrimination, this chilling, this bigotry toward gays and lesbians that are reflected in literally hundreds and hundreds of statutes and regulations in this country."

=== Abortion ===
John McCain		Barack Obama	
On February 18, 2007, John McCain stated, "I do not support Roe versus Wade. It should be overturned." McCain believes that Roe v. Wade should be overturned and that the issue of abortion should be returned to the states.		In his write-in response to a 1998 survey, Obama stated his abortion position as: "Abortions should be legally available in accordance with Roe v. Wade." While serving in the Illinois Senate, Obama voted against bills that included partial birth abortion bans. In the presidential debate of October 16, 2008, he argued that partial birth abortions were already illegal, and he does not support the practice in accordance with Illinois law. He has received a 100 percent rating from the Illinois Planned Parenthood Council	
Chuck Baldwin	Bob Barr	Cynthia McKinney	Ralph Nader
Baldwin would encourage Congress to pass Ron Paul's Sanctity of Life Act. Would deny federal funds to abortion clinics.		McKinney supports full reproductive rights for women, including safe access to comprehensive prenatal and postnatal/infant care; family planning services and contraception, including "morning after" medication; and abortion. She rejects forced, coerced, or uninformed medication and sterilization, and supports single-payer universal healthcare.	Nader is opposed to legal restrictions on abortion, "I don't think government has the proper role in forcing a woman to have a child or forcing a woman not to have a child... This is something that should be privately decided with the family, woman, all the other private factors of it, but we should work toward preventing the necessity of abortion."

=== Gun control ===
John McCain		Barack Obama	
John McCain believes that the right to keep and bear arms is a fundamental, individual Constitutional right. In the past he has voted to protect gun manufacturers from attempts to make them liable for crimes committed by third parties. McCain opposes restrictions on assault rifles and has voted against such bans. He has supported legislation requiring gun manufacturers to include gun safety devices such as trigger locks in product packaging. He cosponsored legislation to lift the DC gun ban. McCain opposed "waiting periods" for the purchase of firearms. McCain also voted against the 1993 Brady Bill to restrict the availability of handguns.		During a February 15, 2008 press conference, Obama stated, "I think there is an individual right to bear arms, but it's subject to commonsense regulation." He supports the right of local municipalities to determine gun laws. Obama has also stated that he will work to reintroduce the expired Federal Assault Weapons Ban and to make it permanent. In Illinois, he backed changes to state law that included a ban on assault weapons sales and limiting handgun sales to one a month. In Congress, he voted to leave gun-makers and dealers open to lawsuits for actions committed by third parties. Obama has proposed outlawing types of ammunition.	
Chuck Baldwin	Bob Barr	Cynthia McKinney	Ralph Nader
Supports the right to bear arms as an individual right.	Supports the right to bear arms as an individual right. "I oppose any law requiring registration of, or restricting the ownership, manufacture, or transfer or sale of firearms or ammunition to law-abiding citizens."		

=== Death penalty ===
John McCain		Barack Obama	
McCain indicated that he supported the use of the death penalty, mandatory prison terms for selling illegal drugs, and stronger restrictions on the purchase and possession of guns. McCain is a proponent of mandatory sentencing in general.		Obama favors the death penalty for cases in which "the community is justified in expressing the full measure of its outrage." On June 25, 2008, Obama condemned United States Supreme Court decision Kennedy v. Louisiana, which outlawed the death penalty for a child rapist when the victim was not killed. He said that states have the right to consider capital punishment, but cited concern about the possibility of unfairness in some sentences.	
Chuck Baldwin	Bob Barr	Cynthia McKinney	Ralph Nader
		It is the main focus of McKinney's stance on crime that capital punishment should be replaced with life imprisonment. She has voted against bills that would make death penalty appeals harder and the prosecution and sentencing of juvenile delinquency. She has voted in favor of bills that would keep habeas corpus rights in death penalty appeals, as well as in favor of bills to replace the death penalty and finding alternative sentences to capital punishment. She also supports stronger sentencing for hate crimes.	

=== Immigration ===
John McCain		Barack Obama	
McCain promoted the legislation and eventually the granting of citizenship to the estimated 12–20 million illegal immigrants in the United States and the creation of an additional guest worker program with an option for permanent immigration. In his bid for the 2000 presidential nomination, McCain supported expansion of the H-1B visa program, a temporary visa for skilled workers. In 2005, he co-sponsored a bill with Ted Kennedy that would expand use of guest worker visas.		Obama's plan: 1) Improve border security; 2) Crack down on employers who hire illegal immigrants; 3) Enable immigrants in the country illegally to voluntarily pay a fine, learn English, and get in line for legal citizenship; 4) Fix the immigration bureaucracy; and 5) Provide additional economic assistance to Mexico. Obama also supports issuing driver's licenses to illegal immigrants to prevent unlicensed drivers from creating a public safety hazard.	
Chuck Baldwin	Bob Barr	Cynthia McKinney	Ralph Nader
Baldwin would enforce visa rules, and does not support a "path to citizenship"/amnesty for aliens currently residing in the US illegally. Employers who knowingly hire illegals would be prosecuted to the fullest extent of the law. Would end "birthright citizenship", and thus end the problem of "anchor babies". No federal monies would be used for any services to illegal aliens.	Supports better border security to crack down on illegal immigration while also supporting reforms that will "sharply increase" legal immigration. Supports ending birthright citizenship and ending government benefits and services for illegal immigrants.	McKinney believes the wave of new immigration is a result of economic policies and agreements (e.g., NAFTA) that impoverish people and drive them across borders. She opposes the guest-worker program as riddled with abuses, and support human rights protections and amnesty for immigrants in the country illegally, an end to raids, and tearing down the border wall.	Nader does not support open borders, which he says will create a "cheap-wage policy" for businesses. He supports giving illegal workers, who have their taxes withheld, the same labor standards and benefits as American workers. He says the government should "crack down" on employers and stop "brain draining" Third World countries with H-1B visas.

=== Racial justice ===
John McCain		Barack Obama	
Members of the McCain camp have pointed out that George Bush signed a federal directive in 2001 that outlawed racial profiling and ordered the Attorney General to look into the matter.		Obama wants to eliminate racial profiling by federal law enforcement agencies. As state senator in Illinois, Obama helped bring about passage of the state's first racial-profiling law. In October 2007, he asked Attorney General-Designate, Judge Michael Mukasey, to end the practice.	
Chuck Baldwin	Bob Barr	Cynthia McKinney	Ralph Nader
		McKinney supports comprehensive federal investment in low-come families and communities, with an emphasis on people of color, to eliminate racial and other disparities in education, healthcare, imprisonment, family income, wealth, home ownership. She supports a moratorium on foreclosures, and end to the privatization of prisons. Hurricanes Katrina and Rita survivors should be recognized as Internally Displaced Persons (IDPs); she supports protecting their right of return, including their right to vote in their home states, and reparations for the losses they incurred due to government abandonment and negligence. She calls for an end to the "war on drugs", which justifies foreign military intervention and assaults civil liberties; mandatory minimum drug sentences should be ended, and the budget should focus on treatment and prevention.	

=== Federal funding for embryonic stem cell research ===
John McCain		Barack Obama	
McCain is a member of The Republican Main Street Partnership and supports embryonic stem cell research despite his earlier opposition. He states that he believes that stem cell research, and indeed embryonic stem cell research, will continue whether or not the U.S. sanctions it, and so it would be the wisest course of action to support it to the extent that the United States will be able to regulate and monitor the use.		Obama supports federal funding for embryonic stem cell research and was a co-sponsor of the 2005 Stem Cell Research Enhancement Act which was passed by both houses of Congress but vetoed by President George W. Bush.	
Chuck Baldwin	Bob Barr	Cynthia McKinney	Ralph Nader
			Nader supports stem cell research. Through his Consumer Project on Technology, he seeks to ensure that research conducted with public money is freely available to the public, and not held back by corporate and university patents.

=== Education ===
John McCain		Barack Obama	
McCain supports the use of school vouchers. In 2006 he said, "Should intelligent design be taught as a science class? Probably not." On July 29, 2007, McCain voted against increasing federal student loans and Pell grants and expanding eligibility for financial aid.		During an October 2004 debate, Obama stated that he opposed education vouchers for use at private schools because he believes they would undermine public schools.	
Chuck Baldwin	Bob Barr	Cynthia McKinney	Ralph Nader
Baldwin would support homeschoolers and disband the Department of Education.	Would abolish the Department of Education and eliminate federal grants and regulation; also opposes No Child Left Behind. Believes that education should return to the local level. Supports state-level tax credits to parents who use private education or homeschool. "Ultimately, education will best serve the children of America if it occurs within a competitive private system rather than a government system."	Has often stated that it is wrong public education receives $38 billion annually while the Pentagon receives $700 billion annually. She also believes reforms like No Child Left Behind hurt the education system, and that free higher education and better primary education is what will improve school systems throughout the nation. She also voted yes on a substitute bill to lower student loan interest rates and increase black college and Hispanic college quality and quantity. She voted yes on a bill for state-testing and voted no on bills to allow vouchers in the District of Columbia, allowing vouchers in private schools and parochial schools, and no on a bill that would only give federal aid to schools that allowed school prayer.	

=== Patriot Act ===
John McCain		Barack Obama	
McCain voted to extend the wiretap provision in the USA PATRIOT Act. He also voted to reauthorize the USA PATRIOT Act in 2006.		Obama called for the repeal of the USA PATRIOT Act in 2003. He voted for the reauthorization of the USA PATRIOT Act in 2006. He supported recent FISA legislation giving telecommunications corporations immunity for cooperating with warrantless surveillance programs.	
Chuck Baldwin	Bob Barr	Cynthia McKinney	Ralph Nader
	During the Libertarian Convention, Barr said of USA PATRIOT Act: "I'd drive a stake through its heart, shoot it, burn it, cut off its head, burn it again, and scatter its ashes to the four corners of the world."	McKinney calls for the repeal of the Patriot Act.	Nader has called for the repeal of the USA PATRIOT Act. He has stated that it has eroded civil liberties and due process of law, particularly for Muslims and Arab Americans.

== See also ==
- Democratic Party (United States) presidential candidates, 2008
- Republican Party (United States) presidential candidates, 2008
- United States third party and independent presidential candidates, 2008
- Political positions of John McCain
- Political positions of Barack Obama
- Political positions of Joe Biden
- Political positions of Sarah Palin
- Political positions of Cynthia McKinney
- Political positions of Bob Barr
- United States federal budget
