= 2008 United States presidential candidates =

2008 United States presidential candidates may refer to:

- List of candidates in the United States presidential election, 2008
- United States Democratic presidential candidates, 2008
- United States Republican presidential candidates, 2008
- United States third party presidential candidates, 2008
