= List of candidates in the 2008 United States presidential election =

The following are lists of candidates in the 2008 United States presidential election. Candidates who are not on any state ballots, withdrew from the race, suspended their presidential campaign, or failed to earn their party's nomination are listed separately.

== Party nominees ==
All candidates in the table below were on the ballot in multiple states. Those who were on the ballot in enough states to win a majority in the U.S. Electoral College are marked in bold. Candidates who were on the ballot in no more than one state are listed in the next section.

Ron Paul was on the ballot in Louisiana with Barry Goldwater, Jr. on the Louisiana Taxpayers Party ticket and in Montana with Michael Peroutka on the Constitution Party of Montana ticket, even though the latter is associated with the national Constitution Party. Paul's supporters also qualified him to receive write-in votes in California. Paul was no longer actively running for president when he attained ballot status and asked to be removed. His request was denied by the Montana Secretary of State, because the request was sent to him too late.

Presidential candidate/running mate	Party	Campaign site
**Barack Obama**/**Joe Biden** (campaign)	Democratic, South Carolina United Citizens, New York Working Families	barackobama.com
**John McCain**/**Sarah Palin** (campaign)	Republican, New York Independence, New York Conservative	johnmccain.com
**Ralph Nader**/**Matt Gonzalez** (campaign)	Independent, Independence-Ecology, Peace and Freedom, Michigan Natural Law, Delaware Independent, Oregon Peace, New York Populist	votenader.org
**Bob Barr**/**Wayne Allyn Root** (campaign)	Libertarian	bobbarr2008.com
**Cynthia McKinney**/**Rosa Clemente** (campaign)	Green	votetruth08.com
**Chuck Baldwin**/**Darrell Castle** (campaign)	Constitution, Kansas Reform, Virginia Independent Green	baldwin2008.com
Alan Keyes/Brian Rohrbough (campaign)	Independent, America's Independent	alankeyes.com
Gloria La Riva/Eugene Puryear	Socialism & Liberation	votepsl.org
Brian Moore/Stewart Alexander	Socialist, Vermont Liberty Union	votesocialist2008.org
Róger Calero/Alyson Kennedy	Socialist Workers	themilitant.com
Charles Jay/Thomas L. Knapp	Boston Tea	CJ08.com
Thomas Stevens/Alden Link	Objectivist	objectivistparty.us
Gene Amondson/Leroy Pletten	Prohibition	geneamondson.com

== Ballot access ==
The two major parties in the United States, the Democratic Party and the Republican Party, had ballot access in all 50 US states and the District of Columbia.

Each state sets its own requirements for candidates to gain ballot access. In some cases it is easier for party nominees to gain ballot access than for independent candidates, so Ralph Nader's independent campaign is associated with parties (pre-existing or newly formed) in some states: PF is the Peace and Freedom Party, NLP is the Natural Law Party, IEP is the Independent-Ecology Party, and IP is the Independent Party. In Kansas, Chuck Baldwin's campaign is associated with the Kansas Reform Party after a legal challenge had been brought to recognize national Reform Party candidate Ted Weill on the ballot.

George Phillies appeared on the ballot in New Hampshire with the label "Libertarian", with Chris Bennett as his running mate.

Candidates who had ballot access to enough electoral votes to win the presidency

	Electoral Votes	Nader	Libertarian (Barr)	Constitution (Baldwin)	Green (McKinney)
States + D.C.	51	46 (50)	45 (47)	37 (49)	32 (49)
Electoral votes (EV)	538	456 (531)	503 (510)	318 (516)	368 (528)
Percent of EV	100%	84.8% (98.7%)	93.5% (94.8%)	59.1% (95.9%)	68.4% (98.1%)
Alabama	9				(write-in)
Alaska	3				(write-in)
Arizona	10			(write-in)	
Arkansas	6				
California	55	PF		(write-in)	
Colorado	9				
Connecticut	7	IEP		(write-in)	(write-in)
Delaware	3	IP			
Florida	27	IEP			
Georgia	15	(write-in)		(write-in)	(write-in)
Hawaii	4	IEP			
Idaho	4				(write-in)
Illinois	21				
Indiana	11	(write-in)		(write-in)	(write-in)
Iowa	7	PF			
Kansas	6				(write-in)
Kentucky	8				(write-in)
Louisiana	9				
Maine	4		(write-in)	(write-in)	
Maryland	10	IEP			
Massachusetts	12				
Michigan	17	NLP			
Minnesota	10				
Mississippi	6				
Missouri	11				(write-in)
Montana	3			(write-in)	(write-in)
Nebraska	5				
Nevada	5				
New Hampshire	4			(write-in)	(write-in)
New Jersey	15				
New Mexico	5	IEP			
New York	31			(write-in)	
North Carolina	15	(write-in)			(write-in)
North Dakota	3				(write-in)
Ohio	20				
Oklahoma	7				
Oregon	7				
Pennsylvania	21			(write-in)	(write-in)
Rhode Island	4				
South Carolina	8				
South Dakota	3				
Tennessee	11				
Texas	34	(write-in)		(write-in)	(write-in)
Utah	5				
Vermont	3				(write-in)
Virginia	13				
Washington	11				
West Virginia	5				
Wisconsin	10				
Wyoming	3				(write-in)
District of Columbia	3		(write-in)	(write-in)	

Other third party candidates

Notes:

- Since Socialist Workers party candidate Róger Calero was constitutionally disqualified to be president, in some states the Socialist Workers Party had James Harris (JH) listed on the ballot.

	Electoral Votes	Prohibition (Amondson)	Socialist Workers (Calero)	Boston Tea (Jay)	America's Independent (Keyes)	Socialism and Liberation (La Riva)	Socialist (Moore)	Objectivist (Stevens)
States + D.C.	51	3	10 (11)	3 (7)	3 (8)	12	8 (30)	2
EV	538	45	125 (180)	47 (75)	91 (168)	137	102 (338)	36
% of EV	100%	8.4%	23.2% (33.5%)	8.7% (13.9%)	16.9% (31.2%)	25.5%	19.7% (62.8%)	6.7%
Alabama	9						(write-in)	
Alaska	3						(write-in)	
Arizona	10			(write-in)				
Arkansas	6							
California	55		(JH write-in)					
Colorado	9		JH					
Connecticut	7						(write-in)	
Delaware	3						(write-in)	
Florida	27		JH					
Georgia	15							
Hawaii	4							
Idaho	4						(write-in)	
Illinois	21							
Indiana	11						(write-in)	
Iowa	7		JH					
Kansas	6						(write-in)	
Kentucky	8				(write-in)		(write-in)	
Louisiana	9		JH					
Maine	4							
Maryland	10			(write-in)	(write-in)		(write-in)	
Massachusetts	12							
Michigan	17						(write-in)	
Minnesota	10						(write-in)	
Mississippi	6							
Missouri	11							
Montana	3			(write-in)				
Nebraska	5						(write-in)	
Nevada	5							
New Hampshire	4						(write-in)	
New Jersey	15							
New Mexico	5							
New York	31						(write-in)	
North Carolina	15						(write-in)	
North Dakota	3							
Ohio	20				(write-in)			
Oklahoma	7							
Oregon	7						(write-in)	
Pennsylvania	21						(write-in)	
Rhode Island	4						(write-in)	
South Carolina	8							
South Dakota	3							
Tennessee	11							
Texas	34				(write-in)		(write-in)	
Utah	5			(write-in)	(write-in)			
Vermont	3							
Virginia	13						(write-in)	
Washington	11		JH				(write-in)	
West Virginia	5							
Wisconsin	10							
Wyoming	3						(write-in)	
District of Columbia	3							

Other candidates

The tickets below were on the ballot in one state. Those without party labels are independents. Some do not have vice-presidential candidates.

- Jonathan Allen/Jeffrey Stath (Heartquake '08—Colorado, write-in in Arizona, Georgia, Montana, Ohio, and Texas)
- Jeff Boss/Andrea Marie Psoras (Vote Here—New Jersey)
- Richard Duncan/Ricky Johnson (Ohio)
- Bradford Lyttle/Abraham Bassford (United States Pacifist Party—Colorado)
- Frank McEnulty/David Mangan (Colorado)
- John Joseph Polachek (New Party—Illinois)
- Jeffrey Wamboldt (We the People Party—Wisconsin)
- Ted Weill/Frank McEnulty (Reform—Mississippi)

=== Guam ===
Although Guam has no votes in the Electoral College, it has held a straw poll for its presidential preferences since 1980. In 2008, their ballot included Barr, McCain, and Obama. On July 10, 2008, the Guam legislature passed a law moving that poll forward to gain notoriety for Guam's election. The legislation was eventually vetoed.

== Primary and convention candidates ==
- Jared Ball (Green)
- Joe Biden (Democratic)
- Sam Brownback (Republican)
- Eric Chester (Socialist)
- Stephen Colbert (Democratic)
- Hillary Clinton (Democratic)
- Chris Dodd (Democratic)
- Susan Gail Ducey (Constitution)
- John Edwards (Democratic)
- Mike Gravel (Democratic, Libertarian)
- Rudy Giuliani (Republican)
- Mike Huckabee (Republican)
- Duncan Hunter (Republican)
- Daniel Imperato (Constitution, Libertarian)
- Mike Jingozian (Libertarian)
- Jesse Johnson (Green)
- Alan Keyes (Republican, Constitution)
- Steve Kubby (Libertarian)
- Dennis Kucinich (Democratic)
- Lee L. Mercer Jr. (Democratic)
- Kent Mesplay (Green)
- Ralph Nader (Green)
- Ron Paul (Republican)
- George Phillies (Libertarian)
- Bill Richardson (Democratic)
- Max Riekse (Constitution)
- Mitt Romney (Republican)
- Wayne Allyn Root (Libertarian)
- Mary Ruwart (Libertarian)
- Christine Smith (Libertarian)
- Kat Swift (Green)
- Tom Tancredo (Republican)
- Fred Thompson (Republican)
- Tom Vilsack (Democratic)

=== Democratic Party primary ballot access ===
Candidate actively campaigning
Candidate with suspended or canceled campaign
Candidate not on ballot

Primary	Biden	Clinton	Dodd	Edwards	Gravel	Kucinich	Obama	Richardson
Iowa (January 3)	JB	HC	CD	JE	MG	DK	BO	BR
New Hampshire (January 8)	JB	HC	CD	JE	MG	DK	BO	BR
Michigan (January 15)		HC	CD		MG	DK
Nevada (January 19)	JB	HC	CD	JE		DK	BO	BR
South Carolina (January 26)	JB	HC	CD	JE	MG	DK	BO	BR
Florida (January 29)	JB	HC	CD	JE	MG	DK	BO	BR

=== Republican Party primary ballot access ===
and Republican Party comprehensive summary at

Candidate actively campaigning
Candidate with suspended or canceled campaign
Candidate not on ballot

	Giuliani	Huckabee	Hunter	Keyes	McCain	Paul	Romney	Thompson
Iowa (January 3)	RG	MH	DH		JM	RP	MR	FT
Wyoming (January 5)	RG	MH	DH		JM	RP	MR	FT
New Hampshire (January 8)	RG	MH	DH	AK	JM	RP	MR	FT
Michigan (January 15)	RG	MH	DH		JM	RP	MR	FT
Nevada (January 19)	RG	MH	DH		JM	RP	MR	FT
South Carolina (January 19)	RG	MH	DH		JM	RP	MR	FT
Florida (January 29)	RG	MH	DH	AK	JM	RP	MR	FT

== See also ==
- List of candidates in the United States presidential election, 2004
- Comparison of United States presidential candidates, 2008
- Third party (United States) presidential candidates, 2008
