= 2008 United States presidential election in Florida =

- November 4, 2008
- Turnout: 75.2% (▲1.0 pp)

Nominee	Barack Obama	John McCain
Party	Democratic	Republican
Home state	Illinois	Arizona
Running mate	Joe Biden	Sarah Palin
Electoral vote	27	0
Popular vote	4,282,074	4,045,624
Percentage	51.03%	48.22%

Obama
50–60%
60–70%
70–80%
80–90%
90–100%
McCain
40–50%
50–60%
60–70%
70–80%
80–90%
90–100%
Other
Tie
No data
President before election
George W. Bush
Republican
Elected President
Barack Obama
Democratic

The 2008 United States presidential election in Florida took place on November 4, as part of the 2008 United States presidential election in which all 50 states plus the District of Columbia participated. Florida voters chose 27 representatives, or electors to the Electoral College, who voted for president and vice president.

Florida was won by Democratic nominee Barack Obama by a 2.8% margin of victory. Prior to the election, most news organizations considered this state a toss-up, or swing state, as polls went back and forth between Obama and Republican nominee John McCain and it was heavily targeted by both campaigns. Weeks before the election, Obama experienced a sudden bump in polling and ended up winning the state with 51% of the vote. This marked only the second time since 1976 that the state was won by a Democrat in a presidential election, which also made Obama the first non-incumbent Democrat to win Florida since Jimmy Carter prevailed in 1976.

Florida is also one of only three states that backed Obama twice that would go on to vote against his vice president Joe Biden in 2020, the other two being Iowa and Ohio. As of the 2024 election, this is the last time a Democrat won Flagler and Volusia counties. It is also the last time in which Florida swung towards the Democratic Party compared to the previous election.

== Primary elections ==
State-run primaries were held for the Democratic and Republican parties on January 29. The Green Party held its own primary on February 1.

=== Democratic primary ===
Florida Democratic Presidential Primary Results – 2008
Candidate	Votes	Percentage	Delegates*
Hillary Clinton	870,986	49.77%	52.5
Barack Obama	576,214	32.93%	33.5
John Edwards	251,562	14.38%	6.5**
Joe Biden	15,704	0.90%	0
Bill Richardson	14,999	0.86%	0
Dennis Kucinich	9,703	0.55%	0
Christopher Dodd	5,477	0.31%	0
Mike Gravel	5,275	0.30%	0
Totals	1,749,920	100.00%	92.5

*As awarded by the May 31, 2008, meeting of the Rules and Bylaws Committee (RBC).
**Subsequently, some Edwards delegates switched to Obama.

=== Republican primary ===
McCain prevailed in Florida's Republican presidential primary.

Candidate	Votes	Percentage	Counties	Delegates
John McCain	701,761	36%	45	57
Mitt Romney	604,932	31.03%	18	0
Rudy Giuliani	286,089	14.68%	0	0
Mike Huckabee	262,681	13.47%	4	0
Ron Paul	62,887	3.23%	0	0
Fred Thompson*	22,668	1.16%	0	0
Alan Keyes	4,060	0.21%	0	0
Duncan Hunter*	2,847	0.15%	0	0
Tom Tancredo*	1,573	0.08%	0	0
Totals	1,949,498	100%	67	57

* Candidate dropped out of the race prior to primary.

=== Green primary ===
As part of the 2008 Green Party presidential primaries, the Green Party held a mail-in primary in Florida on February 1.

Florida Green Party presidential primary (February 1, 2008)
Candidate	Votes	Percentage	National delegates
Cynthia McKinney	-	-	11
Ralph Nader	-	-	2
Kent Mesplay	-	-	1
Kat Swift	-	-	1
Total	-	100%	16

== Campaign ==
Republican George W. Bush of Texas carried Florida by a convincing margin of 5% in 2004 against Democrat John Kerry, a much greater margin than in 2000 when Bush controversially won the state's 25 electoral votes against Democrat Al Gore of Tennessee by 537 votes.

Early polls showed Barack Obama faring poorly in Florida. During the primary season, Barack Obama did not campaign there and argued against seating its delegates for the Democratic convention, earning unfavorable media attention. Moreover, Florida's demographics did not favor him. A haven for retirees, Florida lacked many of the younger voters who passionately supported the Democratic nominee. Thus, in early 2008, opinion polling showed Republican John McCain leading most polls, sometimes by double digits.

Near the end of September, however, when the 2008 financial crisis became a more potent election issue, Obama proceeded to take the lead in most of the polls. Florida was especially hard hit by the economic shock. It was a hotspot of new home building and suffered tremendously from the subprime lending collapse. In addition, the state was full of retirees depending on 401ks; these were badly hurt by the stock market's fall.

=== Predictions ===
16 news organizations made state-by-state predictions of the election. Here are their last predictions before election day:

Source	Ranking
D.C. Political Report	Likely R
Cook Political Report	Toss-up
The Takeaway	Toss-up
Electoral-vote.com	Lean D (flip)
Washington Post	Lean D (flip)
Politico	Lean D (flip)
RealClearPolitics	Toss-up
FiveThirtyEight	Lean D (flip)
CQ Politics	Toss-up
The New York Times	Toss-up
CNN	Toss-up
NPR	Lean R
MSNBC	Toss-up
Fox News	Toss-up
Associated Press	Toss-up
Rasmussen Reports	Toss-up

=== Polling ===
The 3 poll averages showed McCain leading throughout most of the presidential election season, until the last month of October. The final 3 polls had Obama leading 49% to 48% with undecided voters to decide the election.

=== Fundraising ===
McCain raised $14,826,093. Obama raised $19,963,592.

=== Advertising and visits ===
Obama and his interest groups spent $36,990,591 in the state. McCain and his interest groups spent $17,133,501. The Democratic ticket visited the state 12 times to the Republicans' 11 times.

== Analysis ==
Obama won the state and its 27 electoral votes on Election Day by a margin of about 2.82%. Obama held a consistent lead for most of the night as returns came in, but the networks avoided calling the state for Obama until the conservative northwestern portion, most of which is in the Central Time Zone, began reporting its returns. According to exit polling, Obama's win in the state can be attributed to winning 96% of the African-American vote, 57% of Latino voters, and 52% among Independents.

Upset wins in the Orlando and Tampa Bay areas, where George W. Bush won in 2004, contributed to Obama's victory. In the former, Obama carried Orange County (which includes Orlando) by 19 points - the best margin for a Democratic candidate in 64 years. Before Al Gore and John Kerry narrowly won it, Orange County hadn't supported a Democratic presidential nominee since Franklin D. Roosevelt's last run for president in 1944. He also became the first Democrat to win Orlando in a presidential election since Roosevelt. Obama carried Osceola County, near Orlando, by a 20-point margin (Bush won it in 2004 52%-47%).

In the Tampa Bay region, Obama carried Hillsborough County, home to Tampa, by a 7-point margin. Obama also won Pinellas County, home to St. Petersburg, by a 53%-45% margin. Bush had narrowly carried the county by about 0.1% in 2004. Like most Democratic candidates, Obama dominated South Florida, winning Miami-Dade, Broward, and Palm Beach counties by comfortable margins. The vote from Miami-Dade came in very late in the evening, stopping the major networks from calling the state for Obama earlier in the evening. However, Obama maintained a lead of at least 125,000 votes from the moment polls closed in the state.

On the other hand, John McCain kept the state relatively close, losing by far less than his national average. In northern Florida, a Republican stronghold, McCain won the majority of counties by double-digit landslides. Along the panhandle, McCain routinely took over 70% of the vote. Obama won only a handful of counties - most home to major colleges. Moreover, McCain improved on George Bush's performance in large parts of northern Florida - something he achieved in very few other areas of the country. Obama's sole accomplishment involved Duval County (Jacksonville), where he narrowed George Bush's 61,580-vote victory to a far smaller 7,919 margin. In 2008, Duval County had only supported a Democrat for president twice since 1952, when John F. Kennedy carried it in 1960 and when Jimmy Carter carried it in 1976.

In addition, McCain was able to do well along the I-4 corridor in central Florida. This heavily populated, "swingy" region often determines which candidate wins in Florida's statewide elections. In 2008, the Republican candidate won most counties, including heavily populated areas such as Brevard County. However, McCain's unexpectedly poor showing in Orlando, a city that had voted Republican in presidential elections from 1948 to 2004, severely hurt his position in central Florida.

Democrats also picked up two seats from Florida in the U.S. House of Representatives. Democrat Alan Grayson defeated incumbent Republican Ric Keller for Florida's 8th Congressional District seat while Democrat Suzanne Kosmas ousted incumbent Republican Tom Feeney for Florida's 24th Congressional District seat. Republicans, however, were successful at winning back Republican Mark Foley's old congressional seat in Florida's 16th Congressional District seat when Tom Rooney defeated Democratic incumbent Tim Mahoney by a comfortable margin. At the state level, Democrats picked up two seats in the Florida House of Representatives as well.

Obama became the first ever Democrat to win the White House without carrying Dixie, Gilchrist, Hamilton or Sumter Counties, as well as the first to do so without carrying Levy County since James Buchanan in 1856, the first to do so without carrying Pasco County since John F. Kennedy in 1960, and the first to do so without carrying Glades, Madison, Hernando, Okeechobee, or Putnam Counties since Lyndon B. Johnson in 1964.

As of 2024, this is the most recent presidential election where Flagler County and Volusia County supported the Democratic candidate.

== Results ==
United States presidential election in Florida, 2008
Party	Candidate	Votes	Percentage	Electoral votes
Democratic	Barack Obama	4,282,074	51.03%	27
Republican	John McCain	4,045,624	48.22%	0
Ecology	Ralph Nader	28,124	0.34%	0
Libertarian	Bob Barr	17,218	0.21%	0
Constitution	Chuck Baldwin	7,915	0.09%	0
Green	Cynthia A. McKinney	2,887	0.03%	0
America's Independent	Alan Keyes	2,550	0.03%	0
Socialism and Liberation	Gloria LaRiva	1,516	0.02%	0
Boston Tea	Charles Jay	795	0.01%	0
Socialist Workers	James Harris	533	0.01%	0
Objectivist	Thomas R. Stevens	419	0.00%	0
Socialist	Brian Moore	405	0.00%	0
Write-in	Gary Nettles	391	0.00%	0
Prohibition	Gene Amondson	293	0.00%	0
Totals		8,390,744	100.00%	27
Voter turnout (Voting age population)				75.0%

=== By county ===
County	Barack Obama Democratic		John McCain Republican		Various candidates Other parties		Margin		Total votes cast
County	#	%	#	%	#	%	#	%	Total votes cast
Alachua	75,565	59.99%	48,513	38.51%	1,889	1.50%	27,052	21.48%	125,967
Baker	2,327	20.99%	8,672	78.22%	88	0.79%	-6,345	-57.23%	11,087
Bay	23,653	29.07%	56,683	69.66%	1,030	1.26%	-33,030	-40.59%	81,366
Bradford	3,430	29.31%	8,136	69.52%	137	1.17%	-4,706	-40.21%	11,703
Brevard	127,620	44.17%	157,589	54.54%	3,718	1.29%	-29,969	-10.37%	288,927
Broward	492,640	67.02%	237,729	32.34%	4,722	0.64%	254,911	34.68%	735,091
Calhoun	1,821	29.07%	4,345	69.36%	98	1.56%	-2,524	-40.29%	6,264
Charlotte	39,031	45.65%	45,205	52.87%	1,263	1.48%	-6,174	-7.22%	85,499
Citrus	31,460	41.12%	43,706	57.13%	1,343	1.75%	-12,246	-16.01%	76,509
Clay	26,697	28.18%	67,203	70.95%	823	0.88%	-40,506	-42.77%	94,723
Collier	54,450	38.35%	86,379	60.84%	1,159	0.82%	-31,929	-22.49%	141,988
Columbia	9,171	32.50%	18,670	66.17%	374	1.32%	-9,499	-33.67%	28,215
DeSoto	4,383	43.12%	5,632	55.41%	149	1.46%	-1,249	-12.29%	10,164
Dixie	1,925	26.40%	5,194	71.22%	174	2.39%	-3,269	-44.82%	7,293
Duval	202,618	48.63%	210,537	50.53%	3,538	0.85%	-7,919	-1.90%	416,693
Escambia	61,572	39.76%	91,411	59.02%	1,891	1.22%	-29,839	-19.26%	154,874
Flagler	24,726	50.24%	23,951	48.66%	540	1.10%	775	1.58%	49,217
Franklin	2,134	35.28%	3,818	63.12%	97	1.61%	-1,684	-27.84%	6,049
Gadsden	15,582	69.14%	6,811	30.22%	145	0.64%	8,771	38.92%	22,538
Gilchrist	1,996	25.53%	5,656	72.34%	167	2.14%	-3,660	-46.81%	7,819
Glades	1,674	39.29%	2,533	59.45%	54	1.27%	-859	-20.16%	4,261
Gulf	2,149	29.77%	4,980	68.99%	89	1.23%	-2,831	-39.22%	7,218
Hamilton	2,364	42.24%	3,179	56.81%	53	0.95%	-815	-14.57%	5,596
Hardee	2,568	34.51%	4,763	64.00%	111	1.48%	-2,195	-29.49%	7,442
Hendry	4,998	45.78%	5,780	52.94%	139	1.28%	-782	-7.16%	10,917
Hernando	41,886	47.46%	45,021	51.01%	1,350	1.52%	-3,135	-3.55%	88,257
Highlands	18,135	40.37%	26,221	58.37%	566	1.27%	-8,086	-18.00%	44,922
Hillsborough	272,963	53.05%	236,355	45.94%	5,183	1.01%	36,608	7.11%	514,501
Holmes	1,446	16.78%	7,033	81.63%	137	1.59%	-5,587	-64.85%	8,616
Indian River	29,710	41.96%	40,176	56.74%	916	1.30%	-10,466	-14.78%	70,802
Jackson	7,671	35.49%	13,717	63.47%	225	1.04%	-6,046	-27.98%	21,613
Jefferson	4,088	51.24%	3,797	47.59%	93	1.16%	291	3.65%	7,978
Lafayette	642	19.01%	2,679	79.33%	56	1.66%	-2,037	-60.32%	3,377
Lake	62,948	42.71%	82,802	56.19%	1,621	1.10%	-19,854	-13.48%	147,371
Lee	119,701	44.34%	147,608	54.67%	2,688	0.99%	-27,907	-10.33%	269,977
Leon	91,747	61.60%	55,705	37.40%	1,483	0.99%	36,042	24.20%	148,935
Levy	6,711	35.72%	11,754	62.56%	324	1.73%	-5,043	-26.84%	18,789
Liberty	895	27.24%	2,339	71.18%	52	1.58%	-1,444	-43.94%	3,286
Madison	4,270	47.94%	4,544	51.02%	93	1.04%	-274	-3.08%	8,907
Manatee	70,034	45.93%	80,721	52.94%	1,712	1.12%	-10,687	-7.01%	152,467
Marion	70,839	43.58%	89,628	55.14%	2,075	1.28%	-18,789	-11.56%	162,542
Martin	33,508	42.67%	44,143	56.22%	871	1.10%	-10,635	-13.55%	78,522
Miami-Dade	499,831	57.81%	360,551	41.70%	4,254	0.49%	139,280	16.11%	864,636
Monroe	20,907	51.75%	18,933	46.86%	563	1.39%	1,974	4.89%	40,403
Nassau	10,618	27.66%	27,403	71.38%	371	0.97%	-16,785	-43.72%	38,392
Okaloosa	25,872	27.01%	68,789	71.82%	1,120	1.17%	-42,917	-44.81%	95,781
Okeechobee	5,108	39.79%	7,561	58.89%	170	1.32%	-2,453	-19.10%	12,839
Orange	273,009	58.96%	186,832	40.35%	3,198	0.69%	86,177	18.61%	463,039
Osceola	59,962	59.41%	40,086	39.72%	877	0.87%	19,876	19.69%	100,925
Palm Beach	361,271	61.08%	226,037	38.22%	4,128	0.70%	135,234	22.86%	591,436
Pasco	102,417	47.51%	110,104	51.07%	3,068	1.42%	-7,687	-3.56%	215,589
Pinellas	248,299	53.38%	210,066	45.16%	6,787	1.46%	38,233	8.22%	465,152
Polk	113,865	46.34%	128,878	52.45%	2,961	1.20%	-15,013	-6.11%	245,704
Putnam	13,236	39.77%	19,637	59.01%	406	1.22%	-6,401	-19.24%	33,279
St. Johns	35,791	33.74%	69,222	65.25%	1,068	1.00%	-33,431	-31.51%	106,081
St. Lucie	67,125	55.49%	52,512	43.41%	1,337	1.11%	14,613	12.08%	120,974
Santa Rosa	19,470	25.49%	55,972	73.28%	935	1.23%	-36,502	-47.79%	76,377
Sarasota	102,686	49.37%	102,897	49.47%	2,422	1.16%	-211	-0.10%	208,005
Seminole	99,335	48.12%	105,070	50.90%	2,021	0.98%	-5,735	-2.78%	206,426
Sumter	17,655	36.04%	30,866	63.01%	462	0.95%	-13,211	-26.97%	48,983
Suwannee	4,916	27.76%	12,534	70.77%	261	1.48%	-7,618	-43.01%	17,711
Taylor	2,803	29.86%	6,457	68.79%	127	1.36%	-3,654	-38.93%	9,387
Union	1,300	24.48%	3,940	74.20%	70	1.31%	-2,640	-49.72%	5,310
Volusia	127,795	52.19%	113,938	46.53%	3,122	1.27%	13,857	5.66%	244,855
Wakulla	5,311	36.94%	8,877	61.75%	188	1.31%	-3,566	-24.81%	14,376
Walton	7,174	26.43%	19,561	72.08%	404	1.48%	-12,387	-45.65%	27,139
Washington	2,863	25.64%	8,178	73.23%	126	1.12%	-5,315	-47.59%	11,167
Totals	4,282,367	50.91%	4,046,219	48.10%	83,662	0.99%	236,148	2.81%	8,412,248

==== Counties that flipped from Republican to Democratic ====
- Flagler (largest municipality: Palm Coast)
- Hillsborough (largest municipality: Tampa)
- Osceola (largest municipality: Kissimmee)
- Pinellas (largest municipality: St. Petersburg)

=== By congressional district ===
Despite the fact that Barack Obama won the state, John McCain carried 15 congressional districts in Florida, including two district occupied by Democrats. Obama carried ten congressional districts, including two districts occupied by Republicans.

District	McCain	Obama	Representative
1st	66.66%	32.10%	Jeff Miller
2nd	54.27%	44.58%	Allen Boyd
3rd	25.99%	73.30%	Corrine Brown
4th	61.35%	37.66%	Ander Crenshaw
5th	55.57%	43.18%	Ginny Brown-Waite
6th	56.04%	42.82%	Cliff Stearns
7th	53.20%	45.68%	John Mica
8th	46.77%	52.47%	Ric Keller (110th Congress)
8th	46.77%	52.47%	Alan Grayson (111th Congress)
9th	52.17%	46.57%	Gus Bilirakis
10th	47.17%	51.30%	Bill Young
11th	33.08%	65.93%	Kathy Castor
12th	50.23%	48.84%	Adam Putnam
13th	52.05%	46.76%	Vern Buchanan
14th	56.76%	42.28%	Connie Mack IV
15th	51.15%	47.67%	Bill Posey
16th	51.80%	47.11%	Tim Mahoney (110th Congress)
16th	51.80%	47.11%	Tom Rooney (111th Congress)
17th	12.37%	87.25%	Kendrick Meek
18th	48.55%	50.74%	Ileana Ros-Lehtinen
19th	33.92%	65.42%	Robert Wexler
20th	35.99%	63.25%	Debbie Wasserman Schultz
21st	50.83%	48.68%	Lincoln Díaz-Balart
22nd	47.59%	51.63%	Ron Klein
23rd	16.83%	82.68%	Alcee Hastings
24th	50.47%	48.52%	Tom Feeney (110th Congress)
24th	50.47%	48.52%	Suzanne Kosmas (111th Congress)
25th	50.25%	49.22%	Mario Díaz-Balart

== Electors ==
Technically the voters of Florida cast their ballots for electors: representatives to the Electoral College. Florida is allocated 27 electors because it has 25 congressional districts and 2 senators. All candidates who appear on the ballot or qualify to receive write-in votes must submit a list of 27 electors, who pledge to vote for their candidate and their running mate. Whoever wins the majority of votes in the state is awarded all 27 electoral votes. Their chosen electors then vote for president and vice president. Although electors are pledged to their candidate and running mate, they are not obligated to vote for them. An elector who votes for someone other than their candidate is known as a faithless elector.

The electors of each state and the District of Columbia met on December 15, 2008, to cast their votes for president and vice president. The Electoral College itself never meets as one body. Instead the electors from each state and the District of Columbia met in their respective capitols.

The following were the members of the Electoral College from the state. All 27 were pledged to Barack Obama and Joe Biden

1. Willis "Chip" Arndt
2. Wayne Bailey
3. Fred Balsera
4. Terrie Brady
5. Karl Flagg
6. Joe Gibbons
7. Janet Goen
8. James Golden
9. Chris Hand
10. Marlon Hill
11. Tony Hill
12. Joan Joseph
13. Allan Katz
14. Gena Keebler
15. Joan Lane
16. Caren Lobo
17. Rick Minor
18. Jared Moskowitz
19. Angela Rodante
20. Frank Sanchez
21. Juanita Scott
22. Geraldine Thompson
23. Karen Thurman
24. Carmen Torres
25. Kirk Wagar
26. Enoch Williams
27. Frederica Wilson
