= Third-party and independent candidates for the 2008 United States presidential election =

- November 4, 2008
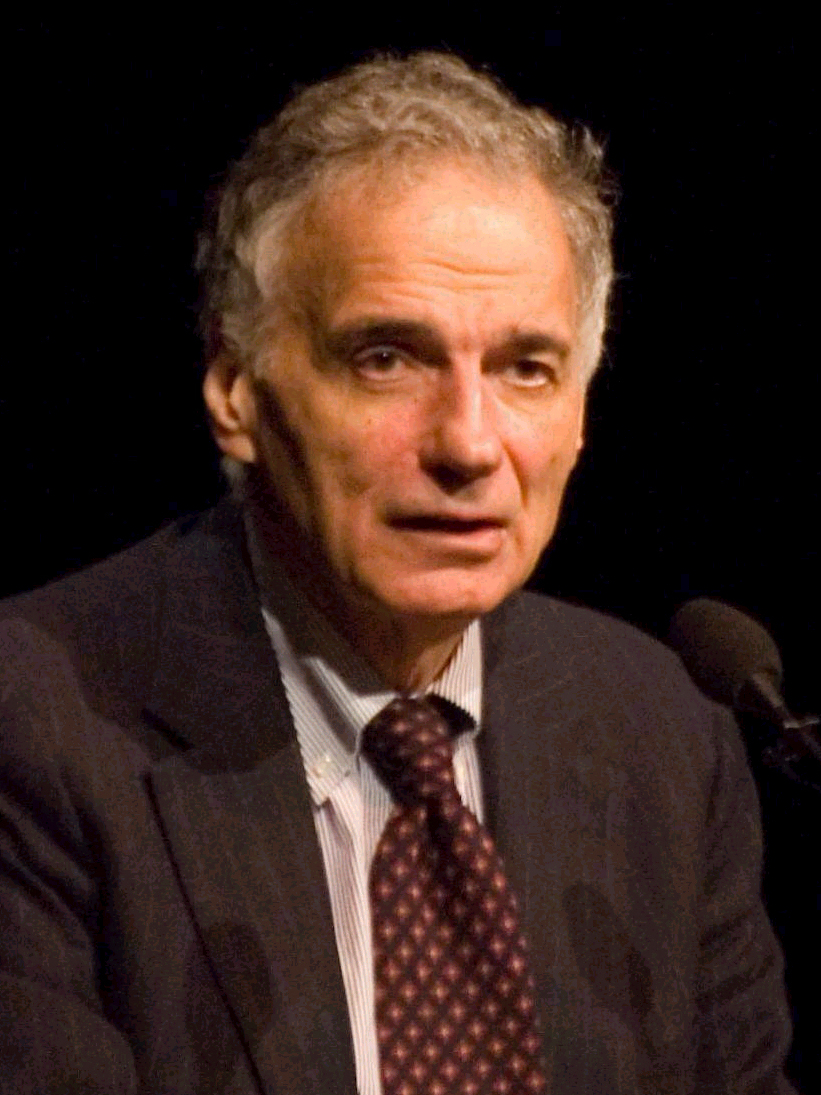

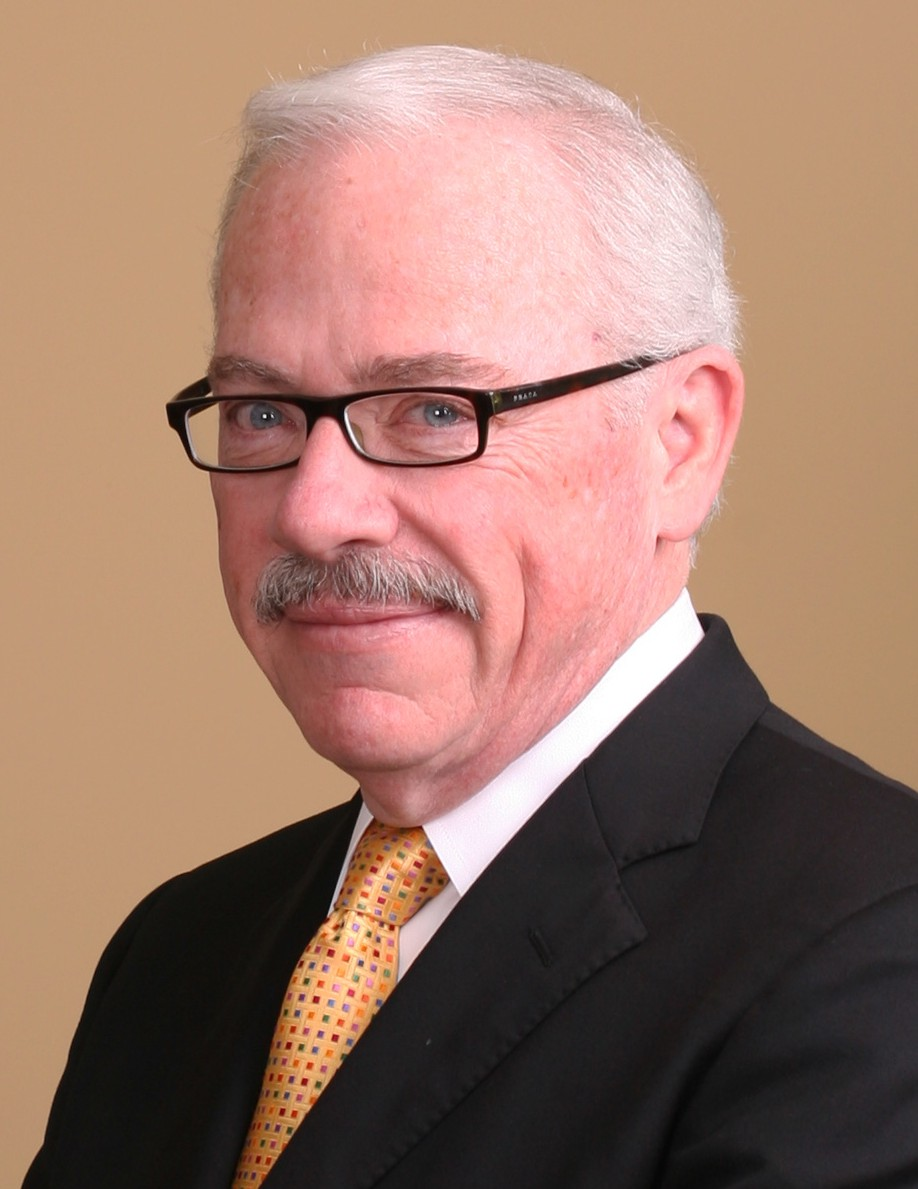

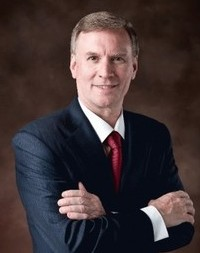

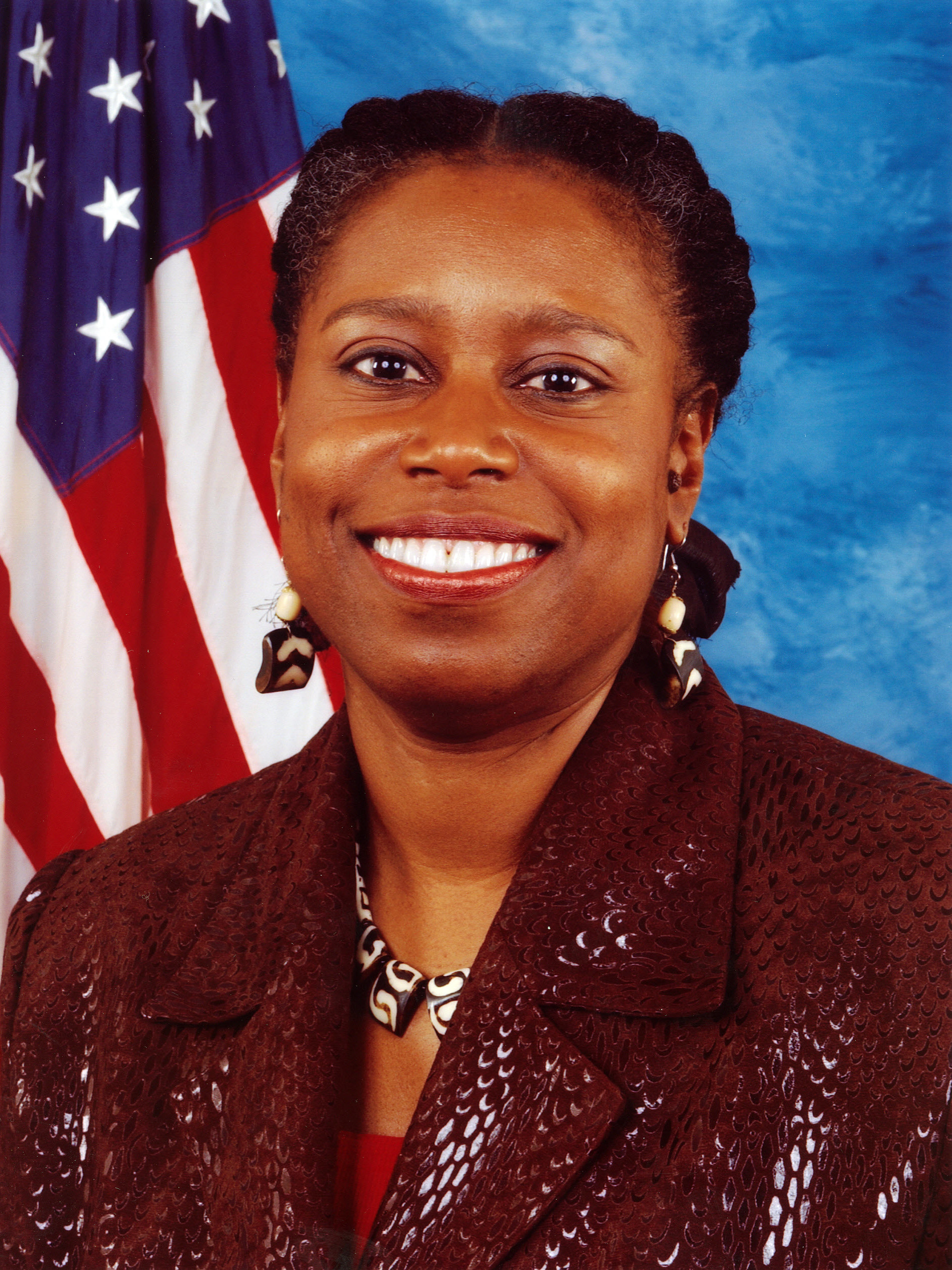

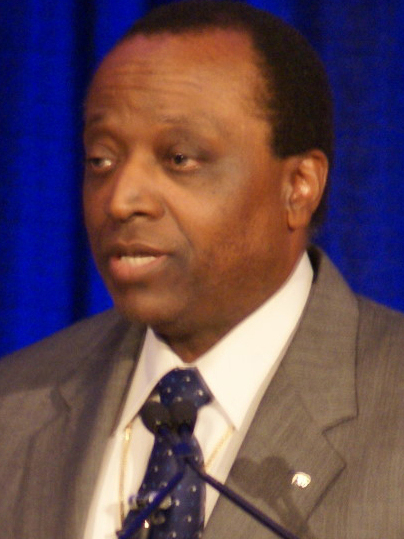

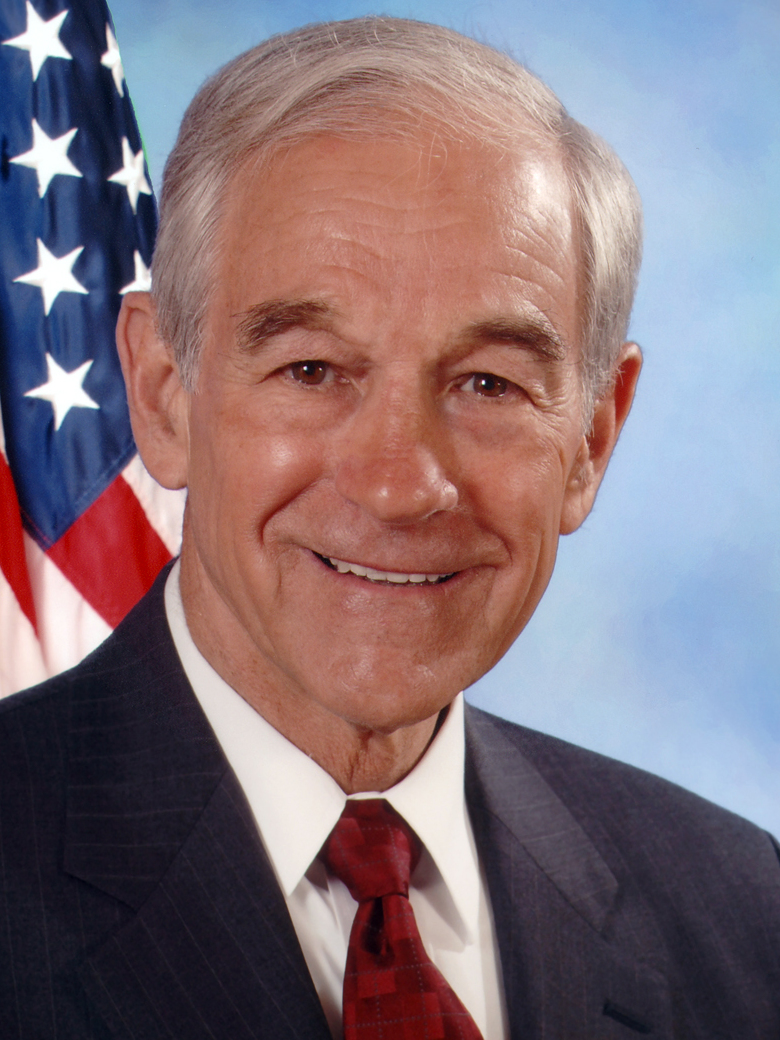

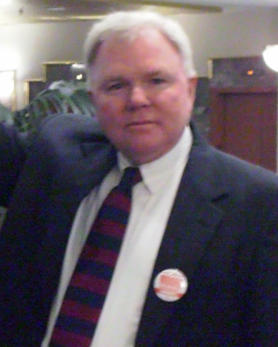
Nominee	Ralph Nader	Bob Barr	Chuck Baldwin
Party	Independent	Libertarian	Constitution
Home state	Connecticut	Georgia	Florida
Running mate	Matt Gonzalez	Wayne Allyn Root	Darrell Castle
Popular vote	739,034	523,715	199,750
Percentage	0.56%	0.40%	0.15%
Nominee	Cynthia McKinney	Alan Keyes	Ron Paul (write-in)
Party	Green	American Independent	Republican
Alliance			Louisiana Taxpayers; Constitution (MT)
Home state	Georgia	New York	Texas
Running mate	Rosa Clemente	Wiley Drake	Varied (Note: Having lost the Republican primaries, Paul did not run an independent or third-party campaign. However, his name was placed on the ballot in Louisiana and Montana, and he was registered as a write-in in California. In Louisiana, his running mate was Barry Goldwater Jr.; in Montana, Michael Peroutka; and in California, Gail Lightfoot.)
Popular vote	161,797	47,746	42,426
Percentage	0.12%	0.04%	0.03%
Nominee	Gloria La Riva	Róger Calero (Note: Because Calero was not a natural-born citizen of the United States and was ineligible for the presidency, James Harris stood in for Calero as the SWP's nominee in several states, receiving 2,424 of the 7,551 votes the SWP received.)	Brian Moore
Party	Socialism and Liberation	Socialist Workers	Socialist
Alliance			Liberty Union
Home state	California		Florida
Running mate	Eugene Puryear	Alyson Kennedy	Stewart Alexander
Popular vote	6,818	7,551	6,538
Percentage	0.01%	0.01%	0.00%

This article contains lists of official third party or independent candidates associated with the 2008 United States presidential election.

Third party is a term commonly used in the United States to refer to political parties other than the two major parties, the Democratic Party and Republican Party. The term is used as innumerate shorthand for all such parties, or sometimes only the largest of them.

An independent candidate is one who runs for office with no formal party affiliation.

Candidates who received, or ran for, the presidential nomination of a political party other than that of the two major parties in the 2008 presidential election, as well those who ran as independents, are listed below.

== Candidates who qualified for minimum 270 electoral votes ==
The following nominees appeared on enough state ballots to theoretically obtain the minimum 270 electoral votes needed to win the election.

=== Constitution Party ===
==== Ticket ====
Presidential nominee Chuck Baldwin	Running mate Darrell Castle
Main article: Chuck Baldwin 2008 presidential campaign Pastor, conservative political activist, and Constitution Party 2004 Vice Presidential nominee. Nominated by the Constitution Party at its 2008 National Convention on April 26, 2008, with 383.8 delegates. On Election Day, Baldwin received 199,314 votes, about 0.2% of the total popular vote.	National Vice-Chair of the Constitution Party. Attorney, political activist and former Marine Corps Lieutenant from Tennessee.

==== Candidates ====
Candidate	Image	Background	Delegates
Alan Keyes		Main article: Alan Keyes 2008 presidential campaign Political activist, former U.S. diplomat. Republican candidate for president in 1996, 2000 and 2008, Republican candidate for U.S. Senate in 1988, 1992, and 2004.	125.7
Max "The Swashbuckler" Riekse		Former U.S. Army lieutenant colonel.	4.5
Susan Gail Ducey		Stay at home mom and registered nurse from Kansas. Started out 2008 presidential campaign running as a Republican then switched to independent prior to seeking the Constitution Party nomination. She was also a 1996 Republican presidential candidate and made a brief run for the United States Congress in 2000 as a Republican in Oklahoma.	1
Daniel Imperato		Businessman from Florida and Libertarian Party presidential candidate.	1

=== Green Party ===
==== Ticket ====
Presidential nominee Cynthia McKinney	Running mate Rosa Clemente
Main article: Cynthia McKinney 2008 presidential campaign Former Congresswoman from Georgia (1993–2003, 2005–2007). McKinney clinched the Green Party nomination on July 12, 2008, at its 2008 National Convention in Chicago, IL with 324 delegates. McKinney also received the endorsement of the Workers World Party in July. McKinney received 161,603 votes for 0.1% of the vote.	Commentator, political activist, community organizer and independent reporter from New York.

==== Candidates ====
Candidate	Image	Background	Delegates
Kat Swift		State Party Co-Chair, progressive activist and newspaper credit manager from Texas.	38.5
Kent Mesplay		Inspector at the air pollution control district of San Diego County (2001–2015) from California.	35
Jesse Johnson		Filmmaker, and 2006 Senate candidate and 2004 gubernatorial candidate for the Mountain Party from West Virginia.	32.5
Elaine Brown		Former Chairwoman of the Black Panther Party from California	9
Jared Ball		College professor, journalist from Maryland. (endorsed McKinney)	8
Howie Hawkins		Co-Founder of the Green Party and Activist from New York	8

=== Libertarian Party ===
==== Ticket ====
Presidential nominee Bob Barr	Running mate Wayne Allyn Root
Main article: Bob Barr 2008 presidential campaign Former Congressman and U.S. Attorney from Georgia. Barr won the nomination of the Libertarian Party on May 25, 2008, at its 2008 National Convention, in Denver, Colorado with 324 votes on the sixth ballot. Barr received 523,686 votes, 0.4% of the national vote.	Sports handicapper, businessman, author, and TV show host from Nevada.

==== Candidates ====
Candidate	Image	Background	Delegates (1st Ballot)
Mary Ruwart		Author of Healing Our World, research scientist, activist, candidate for the Libertarian 1984 presidential nomination and 1992 vice-presidential nomination.	152
Wayne Allyn Root		Sports handicapper, businessman, author, and TV show host from Nevada.	123
Mike Gravel		Main article: Mike Gravel 2008 presidential campaign Former U.S. Senator from Alaska. Previously a candidate for the Democratic Party's 2008 presidential nomination.	71
George Phillies		Professor of Physics at Worcester Polytechnic Institute, 2002 candidate for chair of the Libertarian National Committee, and 1998 Congressional candidate from Massachusetts.	49
Steve Kubby		Businessman, marijuana legalization activist, and 1998 Gubernatorial candidate from California.	41
Mike Jingozian		Software company founder from Oregon.	23
Christine Smith		Humanitarian activist, and writer from Colorado.	6
Daniel Imperato		Businessman from Florida.	1
Robert Milnes		Activist from Camden, New Jersey.	0

=== Independent ===
For independent candidates that did not achieve ballot access in enough states to win 270 electoral votes, see Independents section.

Presidential candidate Ralph Nader	Running mate Matt Gonzalez
Main article: Ralph Nader 2008 presidential campaign Consumer advocate, Write-in candidate in 1992, Green Party presidential nominee in 1996 and 2000, and 2004 independent candidate. Announced candidacy February 24, 2008, on Meet the Press. Nader received 738,475 votes, the third highest total in the popular vote count.	Prominent lawyer and activist in San Francisco, California politics. In 2003 while a city supervisor was elected by peers on the Board of Supervisors to the presidency of the board representing a city of nearly a million people. He was a close second in a mayoral bid that won him 47% of the vote despite being outspent 6.5 to 1.

== Other candidates ==
The nominees of the following parties appeared on fewer state ballots than needed to qualify for the minimum 270 electoral votes required to win the electoral college. These candidates could only theoretically have been elected in the unlikely event of a successful write-in campaign, or in the event that no candidate received at least 270 electoral votes. In the latter scenario, the election of the President would be determined by the House of Representatives.

=== Boston Tea Party ===
Presidential nominee
Charles Jay	Jay was selected as the nominee of the Boston Tea Party at its online Convention held June 15–16, 2008. He was the 2004 Presidential nominee of the Personal Choice Party, which also endorsed him in 2008. Jay received 2,422 votes.

Vice Presidential nominee
Thomas L. Knapp	Blogger, political activist, of Missouri. He also ran for Congress as a Libertarian.

=== New American Independent Party ===
Presidential nominee
Frank McEnulty	President & chief financial officer of Our Castle Homes from California. McEnulty won the New American Independent Party nomination in March 2008. He simultaneously ran as the vice-presidential nominee of the Reform Party in states where the NAIP was unable to obtain ballot status. McEnulty received 828 votes in Colorado, the only state he was on the ballot.

=== Objectivist Party ===
Presidential nominee
Tom Stevens	Objectivist, educator, attorney, political activist, founder and chairman of the Objectivist Party from New York. He received 755 votes.

Vice Presidential nominee
Alden Link	Objectivist, entrepreneur, real estate developer and aviator. He holds residency in both New Jersey and New York.

=== Party for Socialism and Liberation ===
Presidential nominee
Gloria La Riva	Socialist, long-time anti-war and immigrant rights activist, of California. The Party for Socialism and Liberation announced the La Riva campaign on January 17, 2008. La Riva received the nomination of the Peace & Freedom Party in gubernatorial races in 1994 and 1998. She received 6,808 votes.

Vice Presidential nominee
Eugene Puryear	Anti-war activist, social justice organizer, and Party for Socialism and Liberation National Committee member, of Washington, D.C.

=== Prohibition Party ===
Presidential nominee
Gene Amondson	Temperance lecturer, minister, artist, and 2004 Presidential Nominee. Nominated at the Prohibition Party National Convention held in Indianapolis, Indiana, September 14, 2007. Amondson received 653 votes.

Vice Presidential nominee
Leroy Pletten	Temperance movement activist from Michigan.

=== Reform Party ===
Presidential nominee
Ted Weill	Businessman, of Mississippi. Weill received the nomination of the Reform Party at its National Convention in Dallas, Texas on July 20, 2008. Weill received 481 votes.

Vice Presidential nominee
Frank McEnulty	Businessman, of California. McEnulty also ran as the presidential nominee of the New American Independent Party in the states where the Reform Party was unable to obtain ballot access.

Candidates
Daniel Imperato	Businessman from Florida who eventually joined the Libertarian Party.

=== Socialist Party USA ===
Presidential nominee
Brian Moore	Antiwar activist, independent (Green Party endorsed) candidate for U.S. Senate in Florida in 2006. Moore received the Socialist Party USA's presidential nomination at its National Convention in St. Louis, Missouri on October 20, 2007. Moore received 6,528 votes nationally.

Vice Presidential nominee
Stewart Alexander	Political activist and former Los Angeles mayoral candidate of California

Candidates
Eric Chester	Author and former economics professor. 1996 Socialist Party USA vice-presidential candidate, three-time candidate for SPUSA presidential nomination (2000, 2004, 2008).

=== Socialist Workers Party ===
Presidential nominee
Róger Calero	Socialist Workers Party candidate for President of the United States in 2004 and 2008, and for the United States Senate in New York in 2006. Calero received 5,127 votes. Because Calero was not a natural-born citizen of the United States and was ineligible for the presidency, James Harris stood in for Calero as the SWP's nominee in several states, receiving an additional 2,424 votes, giving the party a total of 7,551 votes for president.

Vice Presidential nominee
Alyson Kennedy	Laborer and political activist from New Jersey.

=== Independents ===
Candidates
Alan Keyes	Main article: Alan Keyes presidential campaign, 2008 Former Ambassador in the Ronald Reagan administration. Unsuccessfully sought the nominations of the Republican Party and the Constitution Party before beginning a campaign as an independent. In some of the states he appeared on the ballot for, he was listed as the candidate for America's Independent Party, a party formed by his supporters. Keyes received 47,694 votes. Brian Rohrbough of Colorado was Keyes' running mate.
Joe Schriner	Journalist and author from Ohio. Independent presidential candidate in 2000 and 2004. Dale Way of Michigan was Schriner's running mate.

== Debates ==
Several third-party debates were held in 2008.

Presidential debates

Third-party debates, 2008
N°	Date	Host	Location	Moderator(s)	Participants					
P Participant. N Non-invitee. A Absent invitee.					Democratic	Republican	Libertarian	Green	Constitution	Independent
P Participant. N Non-invitee. A Absent invitee.					Senator Barack Obama of Illinois	Senator John McCain of Arizona	Congressman Bob Barr of Georgia	Congresswoman Cynthia McKinney of Georgia	Pastor Chuck Baldwin of Florida	Advocate Ralph Nader of Connecticut
D1	October 15, 2008	Columbia University	New York City	Amy Goodman of C-SPAN	N	N	A	P	P	P
D2	October 23, 2008	Mayflower Renaissance Hotel	Washington, D.C.	Chris Hedges	A	A	A	A	P	P

Vice presidential debates

Third-party debates, 2008
N°	Date	Host	Location	Moderator(s)	Participants					
P Participant. N Non-invitee. A Absent invitee.					Democratic	Republican	Libertarian	Green	Constitution	Independent
P Participant. N Non-invitee. A Absent invitee.					Senator Joe Biden of Delaware	Governor Sarah Palin of Alaska	Businessman Wayne Allyn Root of Nevada	Activist Rosa Clemente of New York	Lawyer Darrell Castle	Supervisor Matt Gonzalez of California
D1	November 2, 2008	University of Nevada, Las Vegas	Las Vegas		A	A	P	A	P	P

=== October 15: C-SPAN (Columbia University) ===
The first of two televised third-party debates was held October 15 at Columbia University. The debate was broadcast by C-SPAN. It included Independent candidate Ralph Nader, Constitution Party candidate Chuck Baldwin, and Green Party candidate Cynthia McKinney. It was hosted by Amy Goodman, moderator of the widely syndicated TV/radio program Democracy Now!

Libertarian candidate Bob Barr was invited, but declined to participate (citing scheduling conflicts).

=== October 23: Free & Equal debate (Washington, D.C.) ===
The second of the televised third-party debates was sponsored by the Free & Equal Elections Foundation and took place in Washington, D.C., on October 23. The third-party candidates who could theoretically win the 270 votes needed to win the election were invited, and Independent candidate Ralph Nader and Constitution party candidate Chuck Baldwin attended. Journalist Chris Hedges moderated. It was broadcast on cable by C-SPAN and on the Internet by Break-the-Matrix (BtM), one of the event sponsors (Other sponsors included Open Debates, the Daily Paul, and Steal Back Your Vote).

Libertarian candidate Bob Barr was invited, but declined to participate (citing scheduling conflicts).

=== November 2: Free & Equal vice presidential debate (Las Vegas) ===
On November 2, at the University of Nevada, Las Vegas, a third-party debate was hosted by the Free & Equal Elections Foundation. Libertarian VP nominee Wayne Allyn Root, Constitution Party VP nominee Darrell Castle, and independent VP nominee Matt Gonzalez participated.

=== Other ===
==== Alternative Presidential Candidates' Debate ====
An Alternative Presidential Candidates' Debate was hosted by The Coalition for October Debate Alternatives (CODA), the Nashville Peace Coalition, and Vanderbilt Students of Nonviolence at Vanderbilt University, moderated by Bruce Barry. The participants were Bradford Lyttle of the U.S. Pacifist Party, Charles Jay of the Boston Tea Party, Gloria LaRiva of the Party for Socialism and Liberation, Frank McEnulty of the New American Independent Party, Vice-Presidential candidate Darrell Castle of the Constitution Party and Brian Moore of the Socialist Party.

==== October 28: Third Party Forum (Cypress College) ====
On October 28, a Third Party Forum was held at Cypress College hosted by Associated Students. Bradford Lyttle and Frank McEnulty participated as well as representatives for the Constitution Party, Green Party, and Nader campaign. A sixth, Bruce Bongardt, also participated describing himself as a "virtual candidate" who was not on the ballot but wanted to share his ideas.

== See also ==
- List of candidates in the United States presidential election, 2008
- Democratic Party presidential candidates, 2008
- Republican Party presidential candidates, 2008
- 2008 United States presidential election timeline
- List of political parties in the United States
