= Thomas Knapp =

Thomas Knapp may refer to:

- Thomas L. Knapp, founder of the Boston Tea Party (political party)
- Thomas Knapp (MP) for Bristol (UK Parliament constituency)
- Thomas Knapp, governor of the Hudson's Bay Company (1746–1750)
