= Ralph Nader 2008 presidential campaign =

United States independent campaign

Ralph Nader for President 2008
- Campaign: U.S. presidential election, 2008
- Candidate: Ralph Nader; Founder of Public Citizen and progressive activist Matt Gonzalez; President of the San Francisco Board of Supervisors (2003-2005); Member of the San Francisco Board of Supervisors from District 5 (2001-2005)
- Affiliation: Independent candidate
- Status: Lost election November 4, 2008
- Headquarters: Washington, D.C.
- Slogan(s): People fighting back. We'll fight back

Website
- www.votenader.org

The 2008 presidential campaign of Ralph Nader, political activist, author, lecturer and attorney began on February 24, 2008. He announced his intent to run as an independent candidate, on NBC's Meet The Press. It was Nader's fifth and final campaign; he ran in the four election cycles prior to 2008: 1992, 1996, 2000, and 2004. The 2008 election was the third in which he had officially run a national campaign. While Nader ran as an independent, in some states he had ballot access with the Independent-Ecology Party, the Natural Law Party, and the Peace and Freedom Party. Nader received 738,475 votes.

== Pre-announcement ==
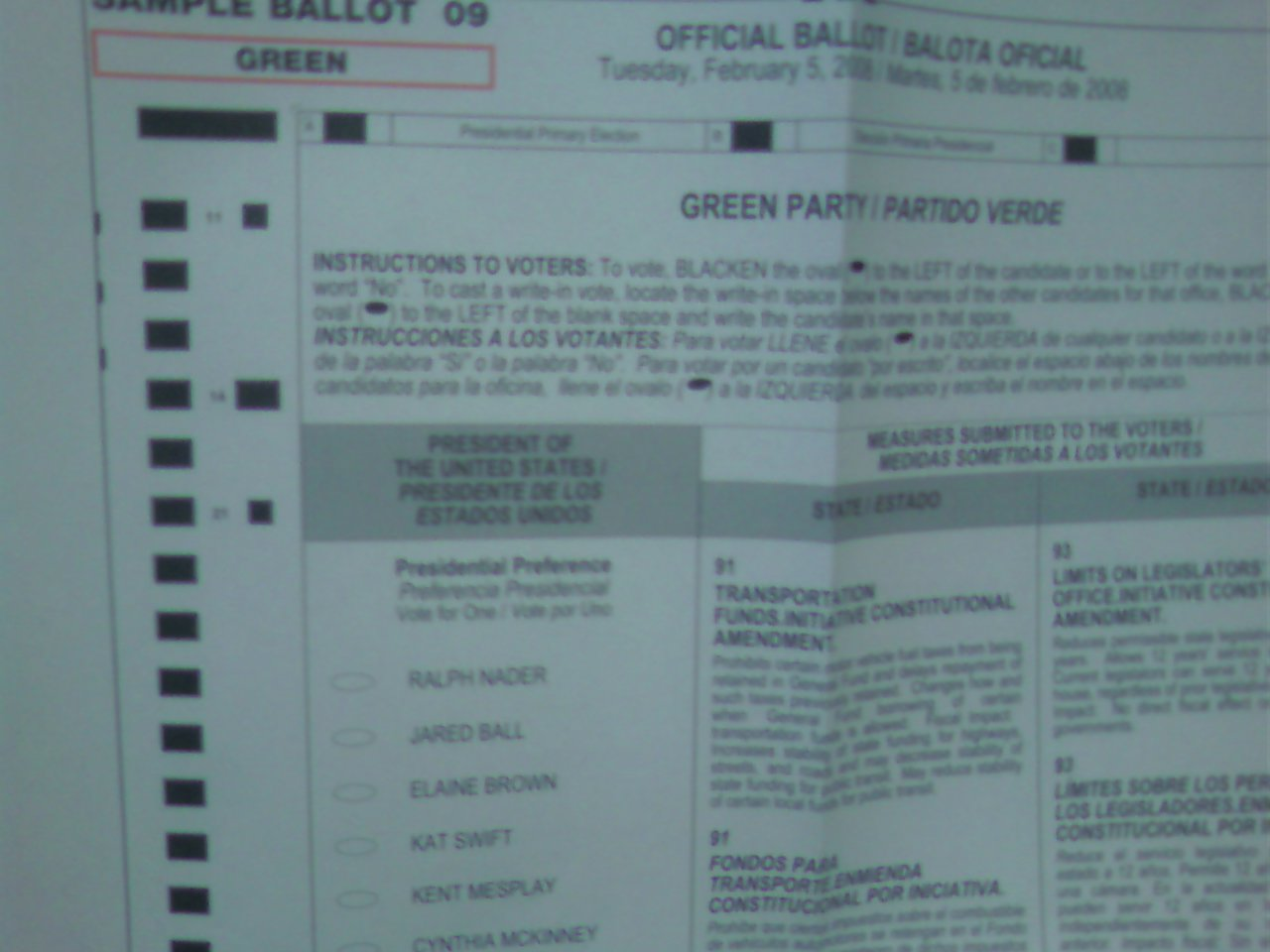
California Presidential primary, Green Party ballot, February 5, 2008, listing "Ralph Nader"

Some Greens started a campaign to draft Nader as their party's 2008 presidential candidate. In June 2007, Nader said, "You know the two parties are still converging -- they don't even debate the military budget anymore. I really think there needs to be more competition from outside the two parties." Nader praised Dennis Kucinich, Mike Gravel, and John Edwards during the race for the Democratic nomination.

Nader hinted more towards his own presidential bid by participating in the Green Party Presidential Debates in San Francisco on January 13, 2008, though not as an announced candidate. He formed a presidential exploratory committee on January 30, 2008, telling CNN he would run again if he could raise the necessary funds.

Before entering the race, Nader was asked by Wolf Blitzer on CNN's The Situation Room if he liked any of the Democratic presidential candidates in 2008. Nader answered "in terms of his record, Dennis Kucinich and in terms of a great Democratic strengthened Democracy proposal, Mike Gravel". A petition was started to urge Nader to run with Mike Gravel as a vice presidential candidate. In the weeks before the Iowa caucus, Nader praised former Senator John Edwards and his populist message, calling him "a Democratic glimmer of hope" and encouraging Iowans to "give him a victory".

== Polls ==
In a Zogby International poll released March 15, 2008, Nader received 6 percent of the vote in a John McCain-Clinton-Nader race and 5 percent in a McCain-Obama-Nader race. According to pollster John Zogby, a self-described Democrat, "Nader's presence in the race can potentially turn a lulu of a race into an absolute tizzy. The messages to Democrats are clear – number one, Nader may win enough support to get into the general election debates. Number two, what could be at risk is support among several key constituencies that the Democratic Party candidate will need to win in November, notably younger voters, independents, and progressives." However, according to pollster Mark Blumenthal, such an effect is overstated.

== Campaign developments ==
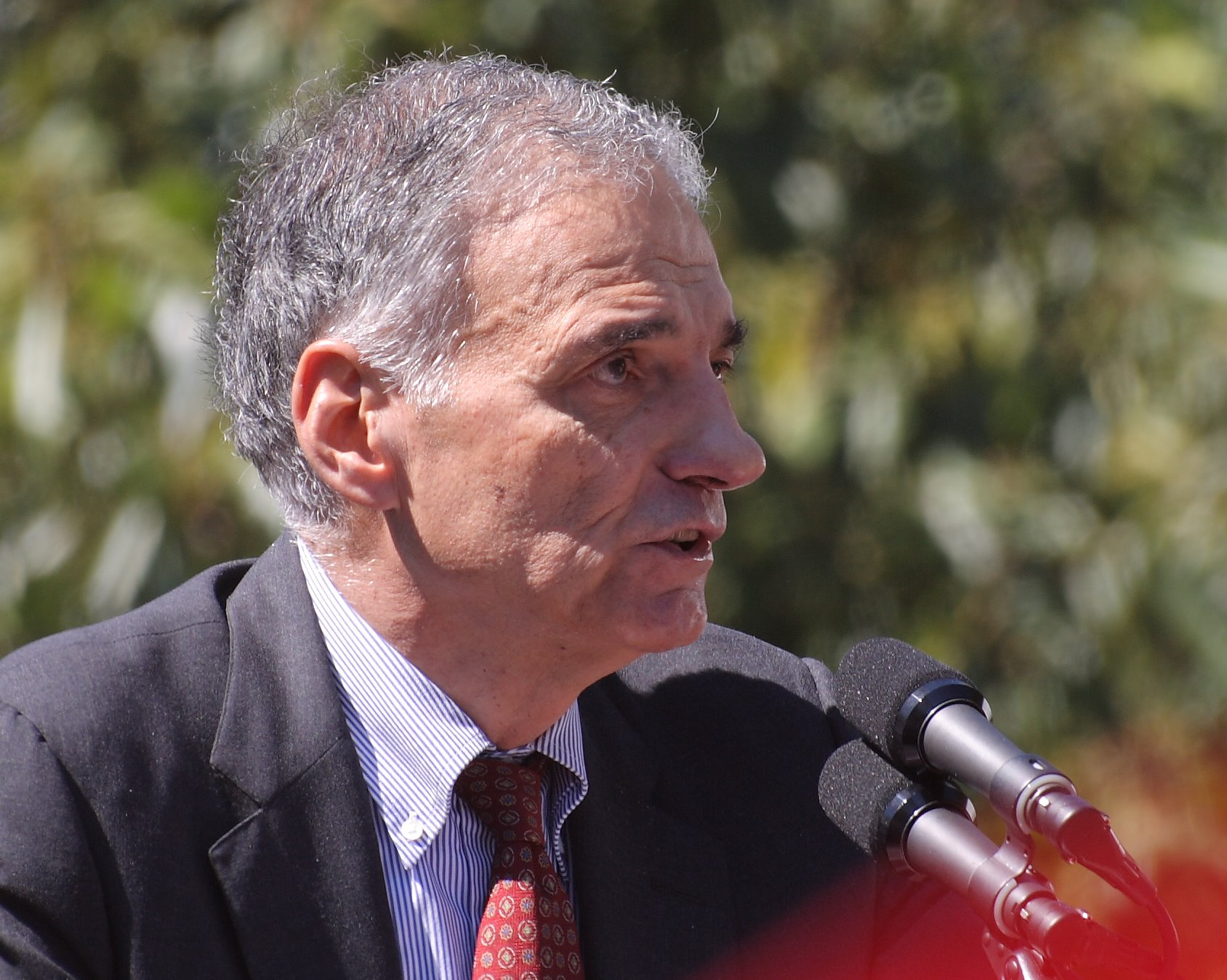
Nader condemning the Iraq War in 2007

After announcing his run on Meet the Press Nader said he had chosen former San Francisco Board of Supervisors president and Texas native Matt Gonzalez as his running mate on February 28, 2008. Gonzalez was a supporter of Nader in 2000 and 2004, and had a background as a public defender and civil rights attorney. He narrowly lost the San Francisco mayoral election to Democrat Gavin Newsom in 2003.

While campaigning at his alma mater Princeton University, Nader gave a lecture titled "The Corporate State and the Destruction of Democracy." He discussed the "political bigotry against third parties" and the lack of limitations on the power of corporations. Nader described his plans for reform, including single-payer national health insurance, cuts to the military budget, crackdowns on corporations, and a repeal of the 1947 Taft–Hartley Act. His campaign website outlined Nader's support for ending the war on drugs and the campaign's opposition to the death penalty.

On March 9, Nader visited West Chester, Pennsylvania, where he talked with the Chester County Historical Society about protection of the "victims" of "corporate crooks." He stated that taxes should be levied first on polluters, gamblers and corporations, and that taxes should be lowered on labor and necessities. He called for a withdrawal of American troops from Iraq criticizing the current presidential candidate's stance on the war, "Children not even born yet today will be in Iraq under these [current] candidates...We will bring our troops home".

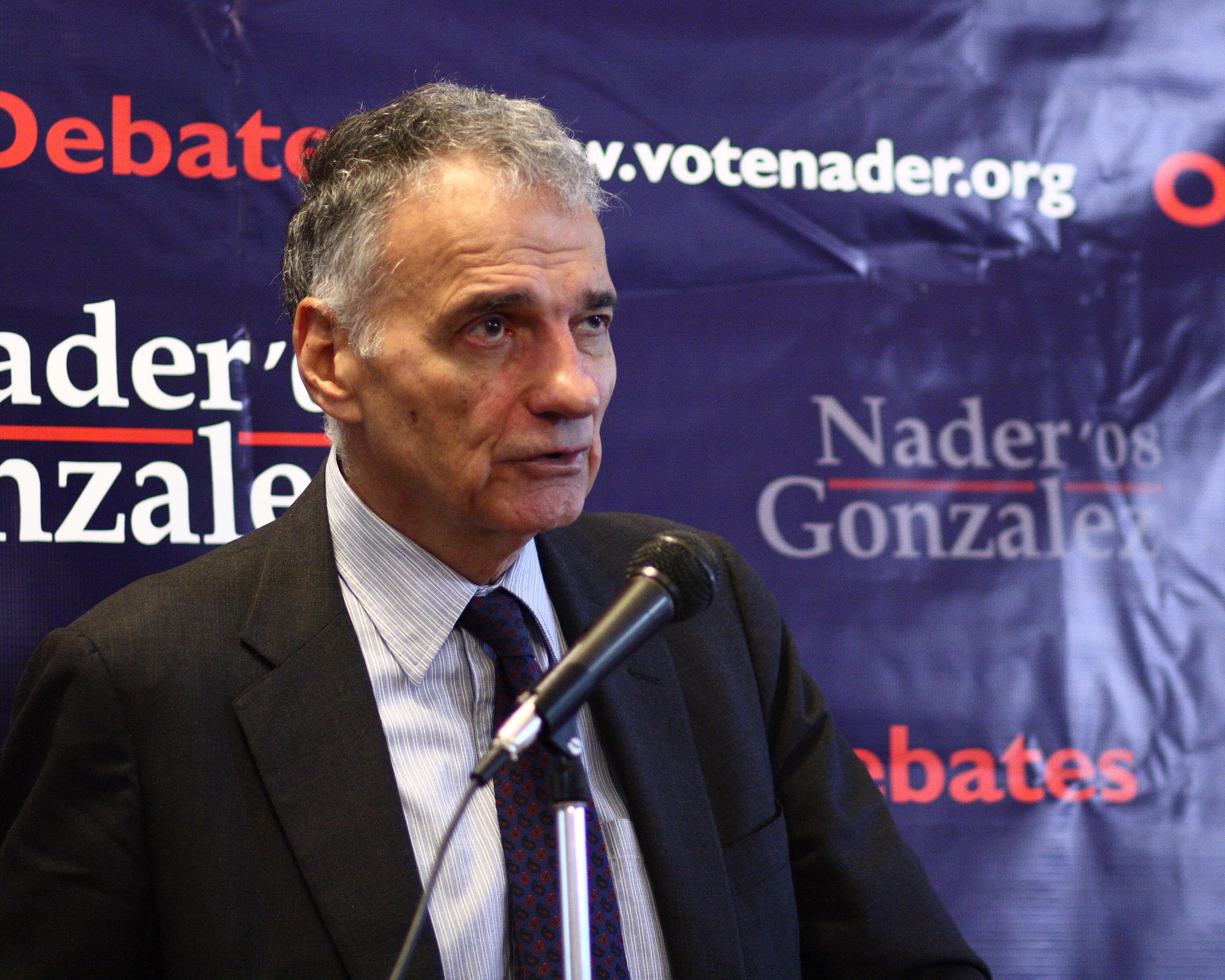
Nader campaigning in October, 2008

In April 2008, Nader praised Jimmy Carter's plan to visit the Middle East, saying: "It is time for all retired military, diplomatic and national security officials from both parties who agree with Carter — and there are many — to band together and launch the Washington Peace Show leading to what a majority of Palestinians and Israelis want — a viable two-state solution."

Nader was selected as the presidential candidate by the Peace and Freedom Party at its convention on August 2. He received 46 delegate votes (60.7 percent) defeating Gloria La Riva, Brian Moore and Cynthia McKinney. The distinction gave Nader instant ballot access in California.

In June, Nader accused Democratic Party candidate Barack Obama of trying to "talk white" and appealing to white guilt in the election campaign. Obama said about Nader's criticism, "He's become a perennial political candidate. At this point, he's somebody who's trying to get attention, whose campaign hasn't gotten any traction."

On September 10, 2008, Nader appeared with Republican presidential candidate Ron Paul as well as several other third party candidates for a press conference at the National Press Club to present the four key principles that they all agreed were the most important of the election. Later that day, Nader and Paul appeared on CNN's The Situation Room with Wolf Blitzer to briefly lay out these principles.

On November 4, 2008, Ralph Nader issued an open letter to Barack Obama, wherein he stated, "Far more than Senator McCain, you have received enormous, unprecedented contributions from corporate interests, Wall Street interests and, most interestingly, big corporate law firm attorneys."

== Result ==
On election night, Nader received 738,475 votes for 0.56 percent of the popular vote in the 2008 United States presidential election, finishing in 3rd place.

=== Controversial statements ===
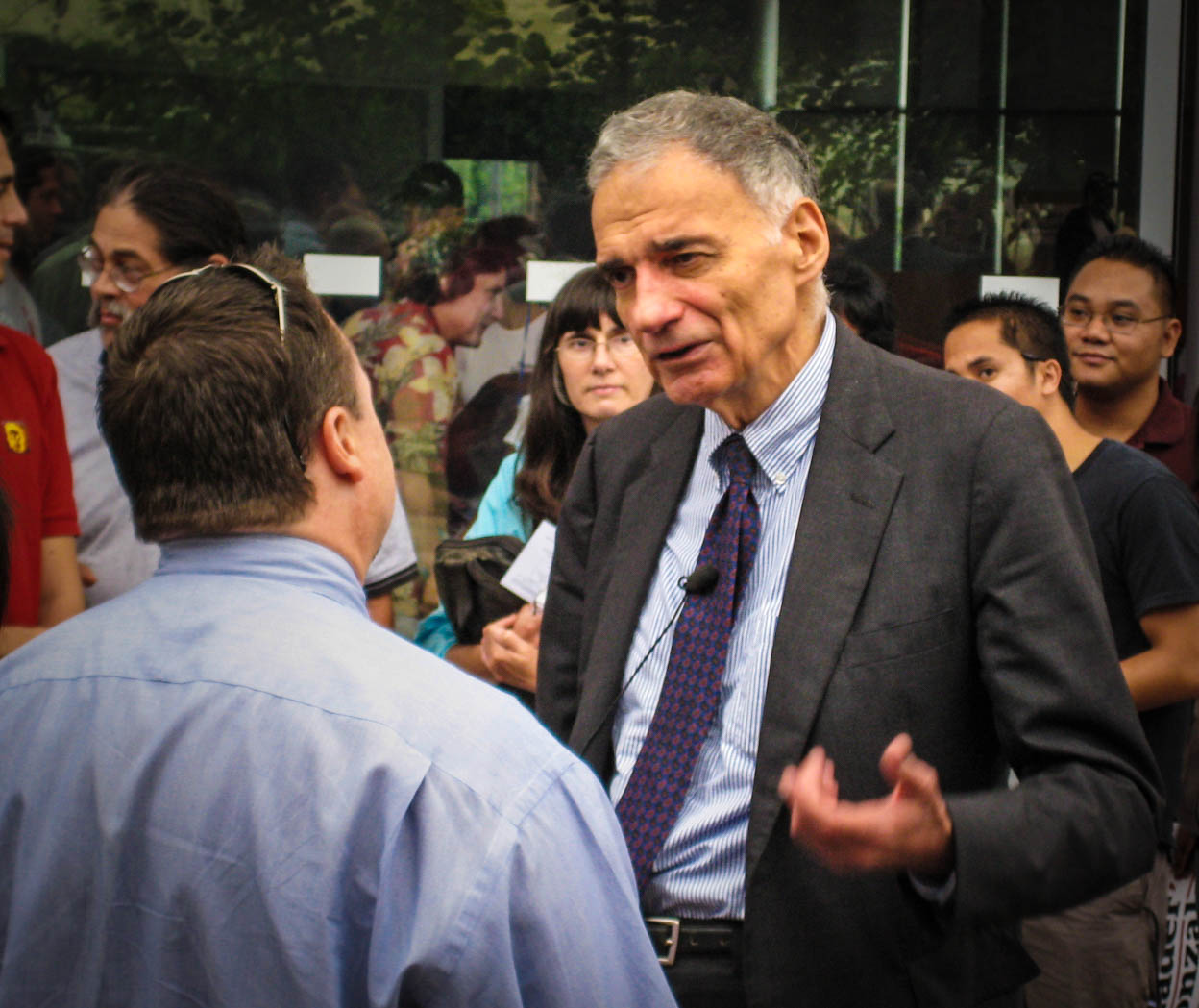
Nader speaks to a reporter after giving a talk at UC San Diego one week before the general election

Nader came under fire during and after the campaign for some comments made regarding the candidacy of Barack Obama. In June 2008, Nader commented in an interview with the Rocky Mountain News that he hasn't heard Obama "have a strong crackdown on economic exploitation in the ghettos. Payday loans, predatory lending, asbestos, lead. What’s keeping him from doing that? Is it because he wants to talk white?" Nader then implies Obama's strategy would be:

He wants to show that he is not (...) another politically threatening African-American politician. He wants to appeal to white guilt. You appeal to white guilt not by coming on as black is beautiful, black is powerful. Basically he’s coming on as someone who is not going to threaten the white power structure, whether it’s corporate or whether it’s simply oligarchic. And they love it. Whites just eat it up.

Obama campaign spokeswoman Shannon Gilson responded, "We are obviously disappointed with these very backward-looking remarks." On election night, as results were coming in and it was becoming clear that Obama has won the presidency, Nader said about Barack Obama in a live TV interview with Fox News anchor Shepard Smith:

To put it very simply, he is our first African-American president, or he will be. And we wish him well. But his choice, basically, is whether he is going to be Uncle Sam for this country or Uncle Tom for the giant corporations.

== Grassroots efforts ==
The Nader 2008 campaign relied heavily on grassroots organizing. The "Roadtrip for Ralph" effort sent Nader supporters to states to get Nader on the ballot.

== Ballot access ==
Ballot access for the campaign, red indicates access while orange indicates write-in access.

By September 18, 2008, Nader and Gonzalez were on the ballot in 45 states; in four of the five remaining states, with write-in status. Oklahoma did not allow write-in candidates. For ballot access in most states, the Nader campaign had to circulate nominating petitions, with varying numbers of signatures and deadlines, to get on the ballot. In some states, the requirements for ballot access are lower for new parties than for independents, so Nader attempted to qualify as the candidate of the Independent Party (composed of Nader supporters). Nader qualified for the 2008 New Mexico ballot using the new party procedure, rather than qualifying as an independent, because the number of signatures for a new party is only one-sixth as many signatures. The campaign also turned in petitions in Hawaii, which requires 663 signatures. The Independent Party turned in approximately 2,100.

== Endorsements ==
- Howard Zinn, historian, political scientist, social critic, activist and playwright
- Reporter Chris Hedges
- Musician and poet Patti Smith
- Former U.S. Senator and Former U.S. Representative James Abourezk
- Former Salt Lake City Mayor Rocky Anderson
- Former Governor of Minnesota Jesse Ventura
- James D. Schultz, political activist and 2018 New York State Assembly candidate.
- Musician and 2000 Election Green Party candidate Jello Biafra
- Ben Stein, speech-maker, actor, economist, lawyer
- Musician Tom Morello of Rage Against the Machine and Audioslave
- Musician Nellie McKay
- Actor William Hurt
- Actress Brooke Smith
- Musician Justin Jeffre of 98 Degrees
- Actor and American Indian activist Russell Means
- Actor Val Kilmer
- Bill Kauffman, journalist and author
- Justin Raimondo, Author and editor of Antiwar.com

== See also ==
- Ralph Nader's presidential campaigns
- Comparison of United States presidential candidates, 2008
- List of candidates in the United States presidential election, 2008
- Third party (United States) presidential candidates, 2008
