= Ken Hachikian =

American businessman and activist

- Born: April 18, 1966 (age 60)
- Education: Harvard University
- Occupation: Public activist
- Organization: ANCA

Kenneth Hachikian (born September 11, 1949) is an Armenian American businessman and public activist who served as the chairman of the Armenian National Committee of America from 2001 to 2016. He is currently chairman of the Armenian Legal Center for Human Rights & Justice.

He received his BA in economics from Harvard College and MBA with High Distinction from Harvard Business School. As a financial and operating executive, he worked for 9 years with The Boston Consulting Group advising Fortune 1000 companies on corporate, financial and operational strategies. From 1990 to 1994, Hachikian served as president of LINC Scientific Leasing, Inc., and, from 1983 to 1989, as president and CEO of Wellesley Medical Management, Inc., which built urgent care centers at 120 locations throughout the US, seeing 1 million patient visits annually. He was the board chairman of Cambridge Heart, Inc. He is presently managing partner of The Ivy Consulting Group LLC, a boutique investment banking and financial consulting firm focused on lower middle market companies.

Hachikian is a proponent of the Dashnak ideology, and has been an active member of both the Young Presidents' Organization and the World Presidents' Organization.
