= BioFuels Security Act =

Vehicles Act

The BioFuels Security Act of 2006 was a proposed legislative Act of Congress intended to phase out current single-fueled vehicles in favor of flexible-fuel vehicles. Under this proposal, contemporary single-fuel vehicles would cease production in 2016.

== Only a Bill ==
Senator Tom Harkin (on behalf of himself, and Senators Richard Lugar, Tim Johnson, Byron Dorgan, Joe Biden and Barack Obama), introduced this bill (S. 2817/109th) on March 16, 2006. The bill died in Congress without a vote.

== Biofuels ==
The bill would also have required major US gasoline companies to carry E-85 renewable fuel (85 percent ethanol), and for 50 percent of their gasoline stations to extend and increase the Renewable Fuel Standards (RFS). To assist in this increase in FFVs, all major gas companies would be required to have 50 percent ethanol distribution tanks equipped to all their facilities. Gasoline companies would receive tax credits for meeting the requirements of distributing and changing pumps to ethanol (an increase from a 30 percent reduction to that of a 50 percent reduction).
