= Rosa Clemente =

American journalist (born 1972)

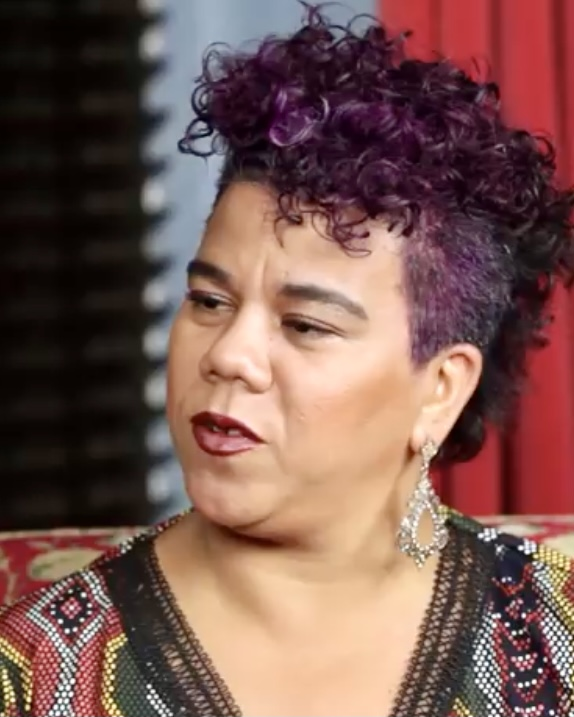
- Clemente in 2017

Personal details
- Born: Rosa Alicia Clemente; April 18, 1972 (age 54) New York City, U.S.
- Party: Green
- Education: State University of New York, Albany (BA); Cornell University (MPS); University of Massachusetts, Amherst

Rosa Alicia Clemente (born April 18, 1972) is an American community organizer, independent journalist, and hip-hop activist. She was the vice presidential running mate of Green Party presidential candidate Cynthia McKinney in the 2008 U.S. presidential election.

== Early life and education ==
Clemente was born and raised in South Bronx, New York. She is a graduate of the University of Albany and Cornell University. She is currently a doctoral student in the W.E.B. Du Bois Department of Afro-American Studies of University of Massachusetts Amherst.

Clemente's academic work has focused on research of national liberation struggles within the United States, with a specific focus on the Young Lords Party and the Black Liberation Army. While a student at SUNY Albany, she was President of the Albany State University Black Alliance (ASUBA) and Director of Multicultural Affairs for the Student Association. At Cornell she was a founding member of La Voz Boriken, a social/political organization dedicated to supporting Puerto Rican political prisoners and the independence of Puerto Rico.

== Journalism ==
Clemente has written for Clamor Magazine, The Ave. magazine, The Black World Today, The Final Call and numerous websites. She has been the subject of articles in the Village Voice, The New York Times, Urban Latino and The Source magazines. She has appeared on CNN, MSNBC, C-SPAN, Democracy Now! and Street Soldiers.

== Activism ==
In 1995, she developed Know Thy Self Productions (KTSP), a full-service speakers bureau, production company and media consulting service.

She attended the 75th Golden Globe Awards in 2018 as a guest of Susan Sarandon.

== Vice presidential campaign ==
In July 2008, Clemente was named the running mate of former Congresswoman Cynthia McKinney. Three days later, on July 12, she was confirmed as the vice presidential nominee of the Green Party of the United States at their annual convention. A month later, Clemente and McKinney appeared at a number of events in Denver, Colorado, which was the site of the 2008 Democratic National Convention. On August 27, Rosa Clemente spoke at an "Open The Debates" rally organized by the Ralph Nader/Matt Gonzalez presidential campaign.

On Election Day, McKinney/Clemente received 161,797 votes (0.12% of the popular vote).

== Personal life ==
Clemente was raised Catholic and identifies as an Afro-Latina Puerto Rican.

Party political offices
Preceded by Pat LaMarche	Green nominee for Vice President of the United States; 2008	Succeeded by Cheri Honkala
