= Tom Stevens (Objectivist Party politician) =

American politician (1956–2019)

Personal details
- Born: Thomas Robert Stevens; 1956 New York City, U.S.
- Died: October 24, 2019 (aged 62–63) New York City, U.S.
- Party: Objectivist Party, Libertarian Party
- Other political affiliations: Personal Freedom Party of New York; Libertarian Party (until 2013); Boston Tea Party (until 2008)
- Education: New York University; Maurice A. Deane School of Law
- Occupation: Political activist
- Website: drtomstevens.blogspot.com

Thomas Robert Stevens (1956 – October 24, 2019) was an American lawyer, politician, and blogger. He founded the Objectivist Party and served as its chair. Stevens was that party's nominee for president in the 2008 and 2012 United States presidential elections. He was the founder of the Personal Freedom Party of New York.

Stevens founded the Objectivist Party on February 2, 2008, the anniversary of the birth of Objectivist philosopher Ayn Rand.

Previously, he had served as president of the New York Young Republican Club; during his time as president, the club engaged in an internal feud. He was indicted for attempting to hire a hit man; however, the charges were dropped.

He previously served as state chairman of the Libertarian Party of Pennsylvania and as an interim vice chairman of the political party Boston Tea Party. In 2010, he announced the formation of the Personal Freedom Party of New York.

Stevens was a graduate of New York University and Maurice A. Deane School of Law at Hofstra University.

Stevens died on October 24, 2019.
