= Boston Tea Party (political party) =

Former American political party

- Leader: Thomas L. Knapp, Founder
- Chairman: Darryl W. Perry
- Secretary-General: Brandi Duncan
- Founded: July 4, 2006
- Dissolved: July 22, 2012
- Headquarters: Online
- Membership (2010): 2,078
- Ideology: Libertarianism
- Political position: Right-wing

Website
- www.BostonTea.us (archived version)

The Boston Tea Party (BTP) was a United States libertarian political party named after the anti-tax protest known as the Boston Tea Party of 1773. It was founded in 2006 by a group of former Libertarian Party (LP) members, who criticized the LP for its "abdication of political responsibilities", saying that "Americans deserve and desperately need a pro-freedom party that forcefully advocates libertarian solutions to the issues of today".

The party effectively disbanded in July 2012.

== Platform ==
The Boston Tea Party supported reducing the size, scope and power of government at all levels and on all issues and opposed increasing the size, scope and power of government at any level for any purpose.

== History ==
The party was founded in objection to new policy changes by the Libertarian Party announced at its Oregon convention in 2006.

In September 2008, the libertarian website LewRockwell.com posted an article by libertarian economist Walter Block. In it, Block proclaimed his preference for the Boston Tea Party's candidates over those of the LP. Block and other libertarians expressed discomfort over the "unlibertarian" history of the LP's 2008 presidential candidate, Bob Barr, a former Republican congressman.

On the April 19, 2011 episode of Jeopardy!, the BTP was a $2,000 clue in a category called "The Mad Tea Party".

On July 22, 2012, Darryl Perry announced his resignation as chair of the party. As there were only two remaining members of the BTP National Committee at that time, Perry's resignation effectively disbanded the party.

== Program and resolutions ==
The party's 2008–2010 program – the four points of Ron Paul's Campaign for Liberty – advocated, among other things, the withdrawal of all American troops from around the world, including Korea, Japan, Europe and the entire Middle East; an immediate and complete end to warrantless searches and seizures, warrantless surveillance, and other practices that encroach on personal freedom; and an audit of the Federal Reserve. The program was deliberately adopted from Ron Paul's Campaign for Liberty.

On December 2, 2009, the national committee passed a spoon in Support of “Honest Money”. One week later Ron Paul introduced H.R. 4248: Free Competition in Currency Act of 2009, a bill 'To repeal the legal tender laws, to prohibit taxation on certain coins and bullion, and to repeal superfluous sections related to coinage.'

The party's members adopted their 2010–2012 program at their online convention held in May 2010. Its five main points are 1) End the Wars of Aggression and withdraw US troops from around the world, (2) End the Federal Reserve Banking System, 3) End the War on Drugs, 4) End Abuses of Liberty such as the Patriot Act and Military Commissions Act, 5) End the Immigration Fiasco by eliminating government restrictions on human migration.

The 2010 Boston Tea Party convention passed resolutions: calling for an independent investigation into the events of September 11, 2001; opposing intervention in Colombia; in support of the "Liberty Amendment"; and renouncing government in all forms. On July 5, 2010, the National Committee passed a resolution opposing "Top Two". On August 8, 2010, the National Committee passed a resolution to join the Coalition Against War Spending. On November 19, 2010, the Boston Tea Party National Committee passed resolutions; opposing the TSA, naked porno-scanners & enhanced pat-downs and supporting the 2nd & 9th Amendments to the Constitution of the United States of America. On February 4, 2011, the Boston Tea Party National Committee passed a resolution of support for the Tunisian and Egyptian people as well as the "rights of all peoples wishing to alter or abolish their present form of government." On March 1, 2011, the Boston Tea Party National Committee passed a resolution supporting War Crimes trials “for every person that has violated the 'law of war'.” The BTP National Committee also passed a resolution condemning government censorship and any press organization and/or members of the media that intentionally distort and/or misrepresent facts.

The final program adopted on May 2, 2012, read: "1. Monetary policy reform: Repeal legal tender law, allow for free competition of currency, and prohibit federal and state taxes on precious metal coins and bullion. 2. Real budgetary reform: Abolish all subsidies/entitlements, drastically cut military spending, cut salary of all federal employees (including elected and appointed officials) and liquidate all government assets other than necessary office buildings. 3. Pass the Downsize DC agenda of Congressional reforms: Read the Bills Act, One Subject at a Time Act, Write the Laws Act, and Enumerated Powers Act. 4. End the Wars Abroad: immediately cease all foreign intervention and bring home troops stationed abroad. 5. End the Wars at home: war on drugs, war on poverty, war on civil liberties."

== Electoral history ==
=== 2008 presidential election ===
Charles Jay was the party's first presidential nominee. He received the BTP presidential nomination in the 2008 general election. He was on the ballot in Florida, Tennessee and Colorado and was a write-in candidate in more than ten other states. Thomas L. Knapp was the party's vice presidential nominee. Knapp was also a candidate for US Congress as a Libertarian Party candidate in the same election. However, alternate running mates included Marilyn Chambers (Arkansas, Hawaii, Louisiana, Nevada, New Mexico, Oklahoma, South Carolina, South Dakota, and Utah), Barry Hess (Arizona), Dan Sallis Jr. (Colorado), John Wayne Smith (Florida) and Thomas J. Marino (Washington).

In the 2008 presidential election, Jay received 2,422 votes, putting him in 15th place.

=== 2012 presidential election ===
On December 23, 2011, after a two-day Presidential Nominating Convention which took place online and was open to all BTP members, Tiffany Briscoe of Maryland was chosen as the 2012 BTP presidential nominee on the first round of voting with 13 out of 20 votes. Kimberly Johnson Barrick of Arizona was chosen as the vice presidential nominee on the 2nd round of voting.

On March 6, 2012, the party membership removed Briscoe as the BTP presidential nominee, replacing her with NOTA.

On March 20, 2012, the party membership passed a motion to hold a new presidential nominating convention, which began on March 30, 2012. Jim Duensing of Nevada was nominated on the 4th round of balloting. Barrick remained the VP nominee.

Ultimately, the BTP did not run a candidate in the general election as the party disbanded in July 2012.
