= Electoral history of the Constitution Party (United States) =

This is a list detailing the electoral history of the Constitution Party (United States), sorted by office.

== Best results in major races ==
Office	Percent (%)	District	Year	Candidate
President	1.3	Utah	2008	Chuck Baldwin
President	1.2	Alaska	2016	Darrell Castle
President	0.8	Washington	2016	Darrell Castle
US Senate	5.7	Utah	2010	Scott Bradley
US Senate	5.2	Oregon	2008	David Brownlow
US Senate	4.0	Pennsylvania	2004	Jim Clymer
US House	30.8	North Carolina District 6	2024	Kevin Hayes
US House	21.1	Florida District 16	2002	Jack McClain
US House	16.9	Alabama District 1	2010	David M. Walter
Governor	36.4	Colorado	2010	Tom Tancredo
Governor	16.7	Wyoming	2026	Rebecca Bextel
Governor	15.5	Nevada	1974	James Houston

== Federal elections ==
=== President ===
Year	Presidential nominee	Home state	Previous positions	Vice presidential nominee	Home state	Previous positions	Votes	Notes
1992	Howard Phillips	Virginia	Chairman of The Conservative Caucus; Candidate for Massachusetts's 6th congressional district (1970); Candidate for United States Senator from Massachusetts (1978)	Albion W. Knight	Florida	Presiding Bishop of the United Episcopal Church of North America (1989–1992)	43,369 (nil%); 0 EV (#7)	
1996	Howard Phillips	Virginia	(see above for previous positions); Nominee for President of the United States (1992)	Herbert Titus	Oregon	Lawyer, writer	184,656 (0.2%); 0 EV (#6)	
2000	Howard Phillips	Virginia	(see above for previous positions); Nominee for President of the United States (1992; 1996)	Curtis Frazier	Missouri	Nominee for United States Senator from Missouri (1998)	98,020 (0.1%); 0 EV (#6)	
2004	Michael Peroutka	Maryland	Lawyer; Founder of the Institute on the Constitution	Chuck Baldwin	Florida	Pastor, radio host	143,630 (0.1%); 0 EV (#5)	
2008	Chuck Baldwin (campaign)	Florida	Nominee for Vice President of the United States (2004)	Darrell Castle	Tennessee	Lawyer	199,750 (0.2%); 0 EV (#5)	
2012	Virgil Goode (campaign)	Virginia	Member of the Virginia Senate (1973–1997); Member of the United States House of Representatives from Virginia's 5th district (1997–2009)	Jim Clymer	Pennsylvania	Nominee for Lieutenant Governor of Pennsylvania (1994; 1998); Chair of the Constitution Party (1999–2012); Nominee for Attorney General of Pennsylvania (2000); Nominee for United States Senator from Pennsylvania (2004)	122,388 (0.1%); 0 EV (#5)	
2016	Darrell Castle (campaign)	Tennessee	Nominee for Vice President of the United States (2008)	Scott Bradley	Utah	Nominee for United States Senator from Utah (2006; 2010)	203,069 (0.2%); 0 EV (#6)	
2020	Don Blankenship	West Virginia	Former CEO of Massey Energy; Republican candidate for U.S. Senate from West Virginia (2018)	William Mohr	Michigan	Chairman of the U.S. Taxpayers Party of Michigan	60,023 (nil%); 0 EV (#8)	
2024	Randall Terry (campaign)	Tennessee	Anti-abortion activist Candidate in the 2012 Democratic Party presidential primaries	Stephen Broden	Texas	Pastor; Republican candidate for U.S. House in Texas (2010)	41,107 (nil%); 0 EV (#8)	
2024 (alternate) (Note: Some state parties such as Nevada and Utah rejected Terry's nomination and instead nominated convention opponent Joel Skousen.)	Joel Skousen	Utah	Survivalist and consultant from Utah	Rik Combs	Missouri	Businessman and 2020 Libertarian nominee for governor from Missouri	12,783 (nil%); 0 EV (#8)	

=== House of Representatives ===
Election year	No. of overall votes	% of overall vote	No. of representatives	+/-
2000	122,936	0.1	0 / 435	
2002	99,306	0.1	0 / 435	0
2004	132,613	0.2	0 / 435	0
2006	68,031	0.1	0 / 435	0
2008	136,021	0.1	0 / 435	0
2010	123,841	0.1	0 / 435	0
2012	118,102	0.1	0 / 435	0
2016	127,376	0.1	0 / 435	0
2018	74,956	nil	0 / 435	0
2020	82,567	0.1	0 / 435	0
2022	44,314	0.04	0 / 435	0
2024	225,303	0.2	0 / 435	0
General election results source:

=== Senate ===
United States Senate
Election year	No. of total votes	% of vote	No. of seats won
1998	183,588	0.3	0
2000	286,816	0.4	0
2002	60,456	0.1	0
2004	404,853	0.5	0
2006	133,037	0.2	0
2008	240,729	0.4	0
2010	338,593	0.5	0
2012	140,636	0.2	0
2014	100,395	0.2	0
2016	93,315	0.1	0
2018	57,932	0.1	0
2020	110,851	0.1	0
2022	40,419	0.1	0
2024	64,984	0.1	0
General election results source:

== See also ==
- Constitution Party (United States) articles:
  - History of the Constitution Party
  - Constitution Party National Convention
- List of political parties in the United States
