= Constitution Party (United States) =

Political party in the United States

- Chairperson: Justin Magill
- Founded: 1990; 36 years ago
- Split from: Republican Party
- Headquarters: 408 West Chestnut Street, Lancaster, Pennsylvania 17603
- Registered voters (July 2026): 145,511 (0.11%)
- Ideology: Christian right; Christian reconstructionism; Ultraconservatism; Paleoconservatism; Social conservatism; Fiscal conservatism
- Political position: Far-right
- Colors: Red, white and blue (national colors); Purple (de facto)
- Senate: 0 / 100
- House of Representatives: 0 / 435
- State governors: 0 / 50
- State upper chambers: 0 / 1,972
- State lower chambers: 0 / 5,411
- Territorial governors: 0 / 5
- Seats in territorial upper chambers: 0 / 97
- Seats in territorial lower chambers: 0 / 91
- Other elected offices: 25 (June 2025)

Website
- constitutionparty.com

The Constitution Party (CP), named the U.S. Taxpayers' Party until 1999, (Note: Candidates in Michigan still run under this ballot line as of 2026.) is an ultraconservative political party in the United States. The party promotes Christian nationalism, cultural conservatism and protectionism.

The party was founded by Howard Phillips, a conservative activist, after President George H. W. Bush violated his pledge of "read my lips: no new taxes".

As of 2026, the Constitution Party is the 7th-largest political party in the United States by voter registration, below the Peace and Freedom Party and above the Working Families Party. (Note: Voter registration ranks are listed here. This list excludes the many different "Independent" parties, with which many voters register in error, and which usually do not run any competitive candidates.) The Constitution Party has had some wins in local elections and very few wins in state or federal elections.

== History ==
At the 1988 Republican National Convention, Republican presidential nominee George H. W. Bush stated "read my lips: no new taxes", but later raised taxes in a 1990 compromise. Conservative activist Howard Phillips ran the U.S. Taxpayers Alliance newsletter. Over 1990-91, Phillips used this mailing list to organize a third party called the U.S. Taxpayers' Party. In July 1991, Phillips attempted to create a coalition with the American Party, which was rejected. In July 1991, USTP launched its first ballot access petition drive, to get party candidate Jack Perry on the ballot in the 1991 US Senate special election in Pennsylvania.

In 1992, USTP sought to nominate Ross Perot or Pat Buchanan, who both declined, leading Phillips to run. In 1996, the party sought Buchanan again, who declined again, leading Phillips to run again.

On September 3, 1999, the USTP national convention renamed the party to the Constitution Party (CP). In 2000, the party split in two, with those who advocated an explicitly religious party leaving to create the American Heritage Party, now named the Christian Liberty Party.

In the 2005 special election for CA-48, Minuteman Project founder Jim Gilchrist was the nominee of the California American Independent Party, then affiliated with the Constitution Party. Gilchrist raised more money than all Democratic candidates combined. Gilchrist placed 3rd with 26,507 votes (25.5%), the highest vote share for a third party candidate for US House election where both major parties participated since the A Connecticut Party received 26.3% in 1994 for CT-1.

In the 2010 Colorado gubernatorial election, Colorado CP affiliate American Constitution Party nominated Tom Tancredo, who received 36% of the popular vote, over the 10% required for major party status in Colorado. Major party status in Colorado gave the party the ability to appoint members to some state boards and commissions, but the party suffered from complicated campaign finance reports and fines from errors in their submissions, which ultimately gave the party a negative bank account balance.

In 2024, in North Carolina's newly-redrawn 6th district, the Democratic Party did not field a candidate, yielding a two-way race between Republican Addison McDowell and Constitution Party member Kevin Hayes. Hayes lost with 104,017 votes (30.8%).

Republicans have criticized the party as a spoiler party. In some cases, the Democratic Party has helped Constitution Party candidates, such as running ads for the CP nominee in the 2020 South Carolina Senate election or helping 2024 CP presidential candidate Randall Terry get ballot access.

== Political positions ==
The Constitution Party has been described as paleoconservative or ultraconservative, Christian right, or Christian reconstructionist. The party promotes social conservative and fiscal conservative views and is usually described as far-right.

=== Economic issues ===
The Constitution Party supports private charity and rejects all social insurance and social spending as inefficient and un-Constitutional. The party opposes Medicaid and Medicare and supports phasing out Social Security. The party seeks to eliminate income taxes and payroll taxes, using only tariffs and excise taxes. The party supports the gold standard. The party also supports a ban on fractional-reserve banking.

The party rejects the scientific consensus on climate change, saying that "globalists are using the global warming threat to gain more control via worldwide sustainable development". The party seeks to abolish the Department of Energy and allow a free market in energy production.

=== Social issues ===
Christian reconstructionist leader R. J. Rushdoony helped write the party's 1992 platform, which stated "the U.S. Constitution established a republic under God, not a democracy". The Constitution Party supports Christian dominionism, the remaking of government and society according to Old Testament Biblical law. The 2004 platform states that the Lordship of Christ Jesus and the Bible are the final authority of law.

The party opposes same-sex marriage, saying "our Creator defines marriage as the union between one man and one woman", and opposes same-sex adoption. It supports proscriptions on "offensive sexual behavior" and rejects "the notion that homosexuals, transgenders [sic] or those who are sexually deviant" deserve legal protection. The party supports a pornography ban, calling it a "destructive element" that yields "real emotional, physical, spiritual and financial costs to individuals, families and communities". The party opposes abortion in all cases. The party supports the death penalty.

The Constitution Party supports stricter immigration controls and an immigration moratorium until federal welfare programs are eliminated. The party rejects jus soli citizenship for children of illegal immigrants. The party says the United States military should enforce immigration policy. The party supports English as the official language and English as a citizenship requirement.

=== Democratic reform ===
The Constitution Party supports the Electoral College and opposes a national popular vote. The party seeks to repeal the Seventeenth Amendment, which requires the direct popular election of Senators, and before which state legislatures elected all Senators. The party supports very strong states' rights, holding that each state's membership in the Union is voluntary (the compact theory) with a right to secede.

=== Foreign policy ===
The Constitution Party supports a protectionist tariff system to counteract the United States' negative balance of trade. The party supports US withdrawal from multinational and international organizations, such as the United Nations, NATO, NAFTA, and the WTO.

== Structure and composition ==
The Constitution Party National Convention, held every four years, sets CP priorities and selects its presidential candidate.

=== Registered voters ===
As of July 2026 the Constitution Party has 145,511 (0.11%) registered voters, the 7th-highest in the United States. Nevada has the most registered CP members, at 85,682 (4.14%), then Florida at 18,383 (0.14%).

| Year | Voters | % | Change | Ref |
|---|---|---|---|---|
| 1992 | 247,995 | 0.3 | Steady | |
| 1994 | 246,951 | 0.3 | Steady | |
| 1996 | 306,900 | 0.4 | ▲0.1% | |
| 1998 | 317,510 | 0.4 | Steady | |
| 2000 | 348,977 | 0.4 | Steady | |
| 2002 | 325,828 | 0.4 | Steady | |
| 2004 | 367,521 | 0.4 | Steady | |
| 2008 | 438,222 | 0.4 | Steady | |
| 2010 | 476,669 | 0.5 | ▲0.1% | |
| 2012 | 77,918 | 0.1 | ▼0.4% | |
| 2016 | 92,483 | 0.1 | Steady | |
| 2018 | 105,668 | 0.1 | Steady | |
| 2020 | 118,088 | 0.1 | Steady | |
| 2021 | 137,367 | 0.1 | Steady | |
| 2026 | 145,511 | 0.1 | Steady | |

== Officeholders ==
The Constitution Party has had limited electoral success at the state legislature and local level. Since the party's creation, 1 Constitution Party member has been elected to a state legislature. The Constitution Party has never won a statewide or federal election.

=== Local offices ===
On November 5, 2002, Greg Moeller became the first member of the Constitution Party to win a partisan election, as Scott Township Trustee in Hamilton County, Iowa, with only a write-in opponent.

As of June 2025, the Constitution Party has 28 members who have been elected to city council seats and other municipal offices across the United States.

=== State offices ===
On February 15, 2000, Rick Jore, a three-term Republican member of the Montana House of Representatives who had attended the 1999 Constitution Party National Convention, announced that he was leaving the Republican Party and joining the Constitution Party. Jore unsuccessfully sought reelection in 2000, and unsuccessfully attempted to win election to the Montana House of Representatives in 2002, and 2004, before winning election to the state house in 2006. He was the first Constitution Party candidate to be elected to a state legislature.

== Election results ==
=== Best results in major races ===
| Office | Percent (%) | District | Year | Candidate |
|---|---|---|---|---|
| President | 1.3 | Utah | 2008 | Chuck Baldwin |
| President | 1.2 | Alaska | 2016 | Darrell Castle |
| President | 1.1 | South Dakota | 2016 | Darrell Castle |
| US Senate | 5.7 | Utah | 2010 | Scott Bradley |
| US Senate | 5.2 | Oregon | 2008 | David Brownlow |
| US Senate | 4.0 | Pennsylvania | 2004 | Jim Clymer |
| US House | 30.8 | North Carolina District 6 | 2024 | Kevin Hayes |
| US House | 21.1 | Florida District 16 | 2002 | Jack McClain |
| US House | 16.9 | Alabama District 1 | 2010 | David M. Walter |
| Governor | 36.4 | Colorado | 2010 | Tom Tancredo |
| Governor | 16.7 | Wyoming | 2026 | Rebecca Bextel |
| Governor | 15.5 | Nevada | 1974 | James Houston |

=== President ===
| Year | Presidential nominee | Home state | Previous positions | Vice presidential nominee | Home state | Previous positions | Votes | Notes |
|---|---|---|---|---|---|---|---|---|
| 1992 | Howard Phillips | Virginia | Chairman of The Conservative Caucus; Candidate for Massachusetts's 6th congressional district (1970); Candidate for United States Senator from Massachusetts (1978) | Albion W. Knight | Florida | Presiding Bishop of the United Episcopal Church of North America (1989–1992) | 43,369 (nil%); 0 EV (#7) | |
| 1996 | Howard Phillips | Virginia | (see above for previous positions); Nominee for President of the United States (1992) | Herbert Titus | Oregon | Lawyer, writer | 184,656 (0.2%); 0 EV (#6) | |
| 2000 | Howard Phillips | Virginia | (see above for previous positions); Nominee for President of the United States (1992; 1996) | Curtis Frazier | Missouri | Nominee for United States Senator from Missouri (1998) | 98,020 (0.1%); 0 EV (#6) | |
| 2004 | Michael Peroutka | Maryland | Lawyer; Founder of the Institute on the Constitution | Chuck Baldwin | Florida | Pastor, radio host | 143,630 (0.1%); 0 EV (#5) | |
| 2008 | Chuck Baldwin (campaign) | Florida | Nominee for Vice President of the United States (2004) | Darrell Castle | Tennessee | Lawyer | 199,750 (0.2%); 0 EV (#5) | |
| 2012 | Virgil Goode (campaign) | Virginia | Member of the Virginia Senate (1973–1997); Member of the United States House of Representatives from Virginia's 5th district (1997–2009) | Jim Clymer | Pennsylvania | Nominee for Lieutenant Governor of Pennsylvania (1994; 1998); Chair of the Constitution Party (1999–2012); Nominee for Attorney General of Pennsylvania (2000); Nominee for United States Senator from Pennsylvania (2004) | 122,388 (0.1%); 0 EV (#5) | |
| 2016 | Darrell Castle (campaign) | Tennessee | Nominee for Vice President of the United States (2008) | Scott Bradley | Utah | Nominee for United States Senator from Utah (2006; 2010) | 203,069 (0.2%); 0 EV (#6) | |
| 2020 | Don Blankenship | West Virginia | Former CEO of Massey Energy; Republican candidate for U.S. Senate from West Virginia (2018) | William Mohr | Michigan | Chairman of the U.S. Taxpayers Party of Michigan | 60,023 (nil%); 0 EV (#8) | |
| 2024 | Randall Terry (campaign) | Tennessee | Anti-abortion activist Candidate in the 2012 Democratic Party presidential primaries | Stephen Broden | Texas | Pastor; Republican candidate for U.S. House in Texas (2010) | 41,107 (nil%); 0 EV (#8) | |
| 2024 (alternate) | Joel Skousen | Utah | Survivalist and consultant from Utah | Rik Combs | Missouri | Businessman and 2020 Libertarian nominee for governor from Missouri | 12,783 (nil%); 0 EV (#8) | |

== State parties ==
=== Current affiliates ===
- American Constitution Party (Colorado)
- Independent American Party of Nevada
- Constitution Party of North Carolina

=== Former affiliates ===
- Alaskan Independence Party (Note: In 2019, the Virginia, Idaho, South Dakota, and Alaska Constitution parties disaffiliated with the national Constitution Party. The Montana Constitution Party disbanded. On April 14, the Constitution Party of Virginia's state committee voted to reaffiliate with the national Constitution Party, but was rejected by the national party on May 2.)
- Idaho Constitution Party
- Montana Constitution Party
- Constitution Party of Oregon (Note: The Constitution Party of Oregon disaffiliated with the Constitution Party of the United States in 2006 in a dispute over abortion policy.)
- South Dakota Constitution Party
- Virginia Constitution Party

== See also ==
- Constitution Party articles:
  - History of the Constitution Party
  - Electoral history of the Constitution Party
  - Constitution Party National Convention
- Paleoconservatism
- Theoconservatism
