= History of the Constitution Party (United States) =

The Constitution Party of the United States is an American political party and an ultraconservative party. The Libertarian Party originated in 1991 among conservative Republican critics of George H.W. Bush.

== Formation ==
During the 1988 presidential election, Republican nominee George H. W. Bush stated "read my lips: no new taxes" at the 1988 Republican National Convention. However, Bush violated that pledge during his presidency. Following the breaking of the no new taxes pledge, Howard Phillips announced that he would form a third political party called the U.S. Taxpayers' Party.

Phillips formed his new party through the U.S. Taxpayers Alliance, an organization he had founded and which had affiliates in twenty-five states, using its mailing list to announce the formation of a new party. Phillips also attempted to create a coalition with state affiliates of the American Party, but was rejected. The party was accepted into the Coalition for Free and Open Elections alongside the Freedom Socialist Party. The party launched its first petition drive when Jack Perry started a campaign to appear on the 1991 United States special election ballot in Pennsylvania.

== 1990s ==
From January 25 to 26, 1997, the national committee of the U.S. Taxpayers' Party convened in Miami, Florida. During their meeting it was proposed to change the name of the party to either "Constitutional" or "Independent American", but the vote was tied 27 to 27 so U.S. Taxpayers' was retained as the party's name. In March 1999, another name change was proposed, with American Independent, American Heritage, Constitutional, Independent American, and American Constitution as possible names, but it was unsuccessful. On September 3, 1999, the national convention of the U.S. Taxpayers' Party was held and during it the name of the party was successfully changed to Constitution. Every state affiliate of the party, except for Nevada and California, changed their names except for in Michigan where the Michigan Secretary of State denied the request. The party is still called the U.S. Taxpayers' Party in Michigan as of 2022.

In 1998, Patricia Becker, the U.S. Taxpayer's nominee for Minnesota state auditor, received over 5% of the popular vote giving the U.S Taxpayers' Party major party status in Minnesota. The party would later hold caucuses during the 2000 presidential election.

In 1998, former Republican nominee for governor Ellen Craswell joined the Constitution Party.

=== 1992 presidential election ===
Members of the party sought to give its presidential nomination to Ross Perot or Pat Buchanan during the 1992 presidential election, but were unsuccessful. In January 1992, Phillips was selected to serve as a tentative presidential candidate for the party until a more prominent candidate wanted the party's presidential nomination. Albion W. Knight Jr. was later selected to serve as the party's tentative vice-presidential nominee.

On April 15, Phillips announced that he would run for the presidency. Phillips accepted the U.S. Taxpayers' Party's presidential nomination at its national convention in New Orleans, Louisiana, which was held from September 4 to 5. In the general election Phillips and Knight placed seventh with 43,400 votes.

Following the 1992 presidential election, the U.S. Taxpayers' Party's had ballot qualified state affiliates in California, New Mexico, and South Carolina.

=== 1996 presidential election ===
In 1996, Phillips sent a memo to conservative Christian leaders including James Dobson, the head of Focus on the Family, stating that anti-abortion candidates like Pat Buchanan, Alan Keyes, or Bob Dornan were unlikely to become the Republican presidential nominee and that they should instead support an anti-abortion third-party candidate.

Phillips supported giving the presidential nomination of the U.S. Taxpayers' Party to Buchanan. Tom Staley, Buchanan's campaign chairman in northern Texas, stated that Buchanan would consider accepting the party's nomination if it had ballot access in all fifty states. Phillips was given the party's presidential nomination again at its national convention in San Diego, California, on August 17, 1996, and Herbert Titus was selected to serve as the vice-presidential nominee. In the general election Phillips and Titus placed sixth with 184,820 votes.

== 2000s ==
In 2000, a schism occurred within the party, with those who advocated an explicitly religious party leaving to form the Christian Liberty Party, then known as the American Heritage Party.

On February 15, 2000, Rick Jore, a member of the Montana House of Representatives who had attended the 1999 Constitution Party National Convention, announced that he was leaving the Republican Party and joining the Constitution Party. Jore unsuccessfully sought reelection in 2000, and unsuccessfully attempted to win election to the Montana House of Representatives in 2002, and 2004, before winning election to the state house in 2006.

On April 2, 2002, Ezola Foster, who had served as the Reform Party of the United States of America's vice-presidential nominee during the 2000 presidential election, left the Reform Party to join the Constitution Party. From 2002 to 2004, she served on the party's national committee.

On November 5, 2002, Greg Moeller became the first member of the Constitution Party to win a partisan election when he won election as a Scott Township Trustee in Hamilton County, Iowa, with only a write-in opponent.

In 2006, the Constitution Party of Oregon disaffiliated with the national Constitution Party over disagreements regarding abortion policy. However, despite disaffiliating the Constitution Party of Oregon gave its presidential nomination to Baldwin during the 2008 presidential election. During the 2012 presidential election the party attempted to give its presidential nomination to Ron Paul, but he rejected it and Will Christensen was given the nomination instead. In 2013, the Constitution Party of Oregon affiliated with the Independent American Party.

=== 2000 presidential election ===
Unlike the 1992 and 1996 presidential elections, the U.S. Taxpayers' Party did not seek a prominent politician to give its presidential nomination to. New Hampshire Senator Bob Smith announced that he was leaving the Republican Party on July 13, 1999, and briefly sought the presidential nomination of the Constitution Party before dropping out.

On September 4, 1999, the party selected to give its presidential nomination to Phillips and its vice-presidential nomination to Joseph Sobran. However, on March 31, 2000, Sobran resigned from the ticket due to conflicts between him being a columnist and vice-presidential nominee. On September 2, Curtis Frazier was selected to replace Sobran as the party's vice-presidential nominee. In the general election Phillips and Frazier placed sixth with 98,027 votes.

=== 2004 presidential election ===
On November 7, 2003, Michael Peroutka announced that he would seek the Constitution Party's presidential nomination and on the same day the party selected him to serve as the stand-in presidential candidate. He won the presidential nominations of the American Independent and Alaskan Independence parties. Peroutka was given the party's presidential nomination and Chuck Baldwin was given the party's vice-presidential nomination.

=== 2008 presidential election ===
Chuck Baldwin and Alan Keyes sought the Constitution Party's presidential nomination during the 2008 presidential election. Jerome Corsi, who co-authored books with Gilchrist and Ohio Secretary of State Ken Blackwell, considered running for the Constitution Party's presidential nomination during the 2008 presidential election, but declined to seek the nomination.

At the party's national convention Baldwin defeated Keyes winning the party's presidential nomination and Darrell Castle was selected to serve as the vice-presidential nominee. Baldwin also received the presidential nomination of the Reform Party of Kansas. In the general election they placed sixth with 199,880 votes.

However, the American Independent Party, which had been affiliated with the Constitution since 1991, split into two factions between supports of Baldwin and Keyes. The Secretary of State of California ruled that the presidential ticket of Keyes and Wiley Drake had the nomination of the American Independent Party. In the general election they placed ninth with 47,941 votes.

On September 5, the Constitution Party of Montana submitted a list of presidential electors pledged to Ron Paul for president and Michael Peroutka for vice-president. Paul was aware and that he would not object as long as he did not need to sign any declaration of candidacy. However, Paul later wrote a letter to the Secretary of State of Montana asking for his name to be removed from the ballot as he was nominated without permission, but it was too late to remove his name from the ballot. Paul also appeared on the ballot in Louisiana under the name "Louisiana Taxpayers Party" with Barry Goldwater Jr. as his vice-presidential running mate. Paul later endorsed Baldwin for president. In the general election he placed tenth with 47,512 votes.

== 2010s ==
County results of the 2010 Colorado gubernatorial election

During the 2010 Colorado gubernatorial election, the American Constitution Party, the Constitution Party's affiliate in Colorado, gave its gubernatorial nomination to Tom Tancredo. In the general election Tancredo received over 36% of the popular vote, more than the 10% required for major party status in Colorado. During the campaign the American Constitution Party's voter registration doubled from 1,271 to 2,731 voters. Major party status in Colorado gave the party the ability to appoint seventeen members to Colorado state boards and commissions, but the party suffered from complicated campaign finance reports and fines from errors and omissions in the reports which led to a negative bank account balance.

On November 18, 2010, Virgil Goode joined the national committee of the Constitution Party. Goode served as a speaker at the Constitution Party's national committee meetings in 2009 and 2012. Goode later served as the party's presidential nominee during the 2012 presidential election.

In 2011, former Republican state legislator Cynthia Davis joined the Constitution Party.

=== 2012 presidential election ===
On February 21, 2012, Virgil Goode, a former member of the United States House of Representatives who had served as a Democrat, independent, and Republican, announced that he would seek the Constitution Party's presidential nomination. Goode won the nomination at the party's national convention which was held from April 18 to 21, 2012, in Nashville, Tennessee, and Jim Clymer was selected to serve as his vice-presidential running mate. Goode was the first Constitution Party presidential nominee to have held elected federal or state office. In the general election Goode and Clymer placed sixth with 122,417 votes.

The Reform Party of Kansas gave its presidential nomination to Chuck Baldwin and its vice-presidential nomination to Joseph Martin as his vice-presidential running mate. However, the party attempted to give its presidential nomination to Goode, but the attempt to change the nomination was rejected by the Kansas State Objections Board.

=== 2016 presidential election ===
Joe Miller, who ran as the Republican nominee in Alaska's 2010 Senate election, considered running for the Constitution Party's presidential nomination during the 2016 presidential election, but later declined. John Hostettler, who served in the United States House of Representatives from 1994 to 2006 as a Republican, also considered running for the party's presidential nomination in 2016.

== 2020s ==
In 2020, the Virginia, Idaho, South Dakota, and Alaska Constitution parties disaffiliated with the national Constitution Party and the Montana Constitution Party disbanded. On April 14, the Constitution Party of Virginia's state committee voted to reaffiliate with the national Constitution Party, but was rejected by the national party on May 2.

=== 2020 presidential election ===
From October 18 to 19, 2019, a meeting of the Constitution Party's national committee was held. Don Blankenship served as a speaker at the meeting and announced his intention to run for the party's presidential nomination. On May 2, 2020, Blankenship won the party's nomination at its virtual convention and William Mohr was selected to serve as the vice-presidential nominee.

However, the Constitution parties of Virginia and New Mexico instead gave their presidential nominations to Sheila Tittle and the Virginia Constitution Party gave its vice-presidential nomination to Matthew Hehl. The South Carolina Constitution Party chose to not run a presidential candidate during the 2020 presidential election.

=== 2024 presidential election ===
The party nominated anti-abortion activist Randall Terry for president and Stephen Broden for vice president. Some state parties such as Nevada and Utah rejected Terry's nomination and instead nominated convention opponent Joel Skousen.

== See also ==
- Constitution Party (United States) articles:
  - Electoral history of the Constitution Party
  - Constitution Party National Convention
- List of political parties in the United States
