= Darrell Castle 2016 presidential campaign =

Political campaign for United States presidency

Castle 2016
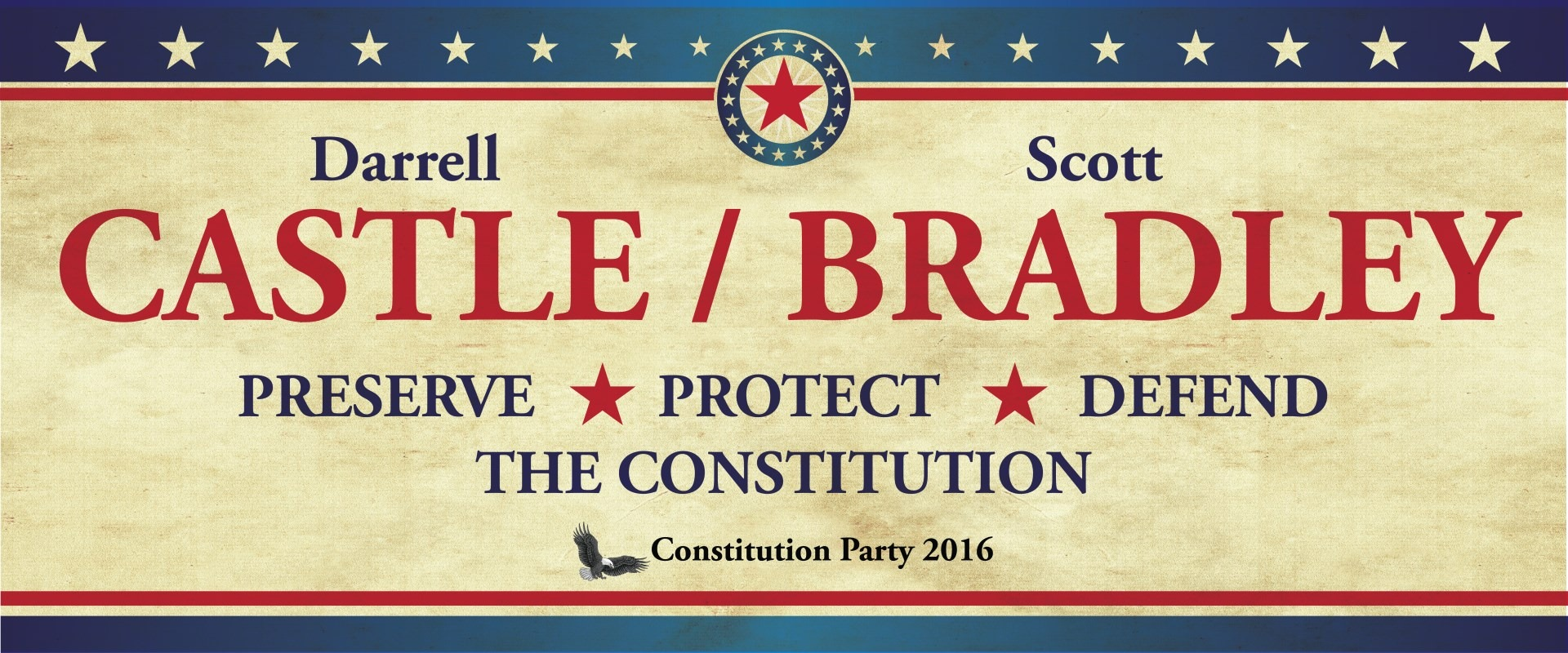
- Campaign: 2016 United States presidential election
- Candidate: Darrell Castle; Scott Bradley
- Affiliation: Constitution Party
- Headquarters: Germantown, Tennessee
- Receipts: US$72,264
- Slogan(s): Preserve Protect Defend; The Constitution

Website
- castle2016.com

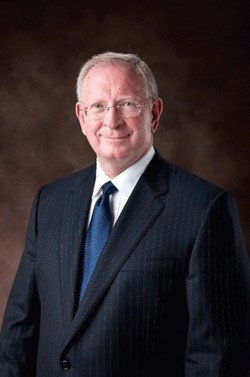
Castle in 2008

The 2016 presidential campaign of Darrell Castle of the Constitution Party began on the eve of the Constitution Party National Convention in April 2016. On April 16, the Constitution Party nominated Castle on the first ballot, after he won 184 votes out of the 339.5 cast to win the nomination with 54.19%. His running mate, Scott Bradley, was nominated by voice vote.

In his acceptance speech, Castle stated;

Today I want to speak to you in defense of liberty and against tyranny. I speak for the republic and against the fascism that seems to be enveloping us. The general government was created by the sovereign states for a specific purpose; that purpose was to protect our God-given rights. Anything that runs afoul of that purpose is therefore illegal and unconstitutional. And since virtually everything this government does runs afoul of that purpose, virtually everything it does is illegal and unconstitutional.

Six days after the convention, he formally filed with the Federal Election Commission (FEC).

The Constitution Party of Idaho nominated Scott Copeland of Texas for president and J.R. Myers of Alaska for vice president in 2016 instead of Castle and Bradley, who were put on the ballot with no party affiliation. The Copeland-Myers ticket received 2,381 votes in Idaho to 4,403 votes cast for Castle.

On Election Day, Castle finished with 172,570 votes to finish in 6th place, with just under 300,000 votes less than Evan McMullin's campaign. They did however gain 50,000 more votes than the previous Constitution Party ticket (Goode/Clymer) four years prior, with their 0.15% being better than the previous campaign's 0.09% of the vote.

== Life ==
Castle attended Ketron High School in Memphis, Tennessee and graduated from Tennessee State University in 1970. During the Vietnam War, he served in the United States Marine Corps before going on to obtain a Juris Doctor from Memphis State University (which is now called the University of Memphis). Castle was a commissioned officer in the U.S. Marine Corps for four years. He graduated from Tennessee State University and Memphis State University. By 1984, he opened his own law firm, Darrell Castle & Associates, which is still operational. The firm operates in bankruptcy, personal injury, social security disability, workers' compensation, and nursing home abuse. Recently in 2022, the firm would take part in a children's mental health lawsuit.

In 1998, Castle and his wife founded the Mia’s Children Foundation, a Christian organization in Romania aiding homeless Romani children. Castle's daughter, Joanna Castle Miller, attended New York University and is a comedy writer based in Los Angeles. She produced a YouTube documentary series on her father's campaign.

== Constitution Party ==
Castle was one of five original founders of the Constitution Party in 1992, which was created to support the candidacy of Howard Phillips. Castle has held many positions in the Constitution Party such as vice-chairman and the Chairman of the Platform Committee. He was also one of the original founders of the party.

=== 2008 Vice Presidential Campaign ===
In the 2008 election Darrell Castle was selected as the vice-presidential (VP) nominee on the Chuck Baldwin campaign in 2008 after winning the Vice-Presidential vote by 75.8%. After losing the Constitution Party nomination to Virgil Goode four years later and receiving only 30% of the votes, Castle became the nominee the following cycle. Castle was the second VP nominee from the Party to later run as the Presidential nominee, the first since 2008.

Scott Bradley was Constitution Party nominee for United States Senator from Utah in 2006 and 2010.

=== 2016 Presidential Campaign ===
Despite not appearing on any primary ballots, the Constitution Party nominated Castle at their nominating convention in Salt Lake City, Utah. He defeated Scott Copeland of Texas and Tom Hoefling of Nebraska.

He was named by The Collegian as an alternative to Libertarian nominee Gary Johnson. Polls showed Castle reaching 0.9% of the vote.

Joanna Castle Miller, daughter of Darrell Castle, produced a YouTube documentary about her father's campaign.

==== Ballot access ====
Ballot access for the Castle/Bradley ticket On ballot Not on ballot, write-in access Not on ballot

The campaign had ballot access in Alaska, Arkansas, Colorado, Florida, Hawaii, Idaho, Iowa, Louisiana, Michigan, Minnesota, Mississippi, Missouri, Montana, Nevada (as the Independent American Party of Nevada), New Jersey, New Mexico, North Dakota, Pennsylvania, South Carolina, South Dakota, Utah, Washington, West Virginia, Wisconsin, Wyoming, with write-in status in Alabama, Delaware, Georgia, Indiana, Maine, New Hampshire, Ohio, Oregon, Rhode Island, Texas, and Vermont. The campaign attempted and gained write-in status in Arizona, California, Connecticut, Illinois, Kansas, Kentucky, Maryland, Massachusetts, Nebraska, New York, North Carolina, Tennessee, and Virginia.

==== Political positions ====
The campaign's main objective was to adhere to the United States Constitution, citing it as a "charter of liberty for the American Republic".

Castle advocates for the end of the Federal Reserve by repealing the Federal Reserve Act and letting lenders and borrowers set interest rates instead, adding that banks would no longer depend on the Reserve to lend them money in an emergency. He also advocates the U.S. Treasury to accept any major currency such as bitcoin and gold.

Castle believes in the United States withdrawing from the United Nations in order to regain sovereignty, freedom, and independence, citing the U.N. as a "church of unbelieving humanism" that is in "direct opposition to the ideas of America" and "an affront to liberty and human dignity". He also supports getting out of NATO, North American Free Trade Agreement (NAFTA), Trans-Pacific Partnership (TPP), Dominican Republic–Central America Free Trade Agreement (CAFTA-DR), General Agreement on Tariffs and Trade (GATT), and the World Trade Organization (WTO).

Castle asserted that he is the only candidate in any party to be 100% opposed to abortion rights, stating that unborn persons have rights to live in part due to the 5th Amendment and 14th Amendment. He supports vetoing any attempt to spend money to fund Planned Parenthood and other abortion providers along with taking away the power of the Supreme Court to preside over the matter via recommendation and collaboration with Congress.

Like the party's platform, the campaign is opposed to gun control of any kind. They also oppose any attempt to go to war without a declaration of war by Congress under Article I, Section 8 of the Constitution. The platform also rejects letting women train or participate in combat due to the practices of dual qualification standards and forced integration undermining the "integrity, morale, performance" of the military organizations.

Citing the 10th Amendment, the campaign supports the right of parents to provide for the education of their children, opposing any federal involvement in education.

Castle advocates for the replacement of the current tax system with a "tariff based revenue system supplemented by excise taxes", along with repealing the 16th Amendment and abolishing the Internal Revenue Service.

Citing James Madison, the platform and campaign favor a moratorium on immigration to the United States until proper security procedures and the discontinuation of all federal subsidies and assistance, except under extreme circumstances. They also reject giving citizenship to children of immigrants born in the country, extension of amnesty and bilingual ballots along with supporting English as the official language for all government business.

==== Polling ====
===== Nevada =====
Five-way race

Poll source	Date administered	Democrat	%	Republican	%	Libertarian	%	IAPN	%	Unaffiliated	%	Lead margin	Sample size	Margin of error
Suffolk University	September 27–29, 2016	Hillary Clinton	44%	Donald Trump	38%	Gary Johnson	7%	Darrell Castle	1%	Rocky De La Fuente	1%	6	500	± 4.4%
Suffolk	August 15–17, 2016	Hillary Clinton	43.8%	Donald Trump	41.6%	Gary Johnson	4.8%	Darrell Castle	1%	Rocky De La Fuente	1%	2.2	500	± 4.4%

===== South Dakota =====
Four-way race

Poll source	Date administered	Democrat	%	Republican	%	Libertarian	%	Other candidate	%	Lead margin	Sample size	Margin of error
Nielson Brothers Polling	October 24–26, 2016	Hillary Clinton	35%	Donald Trump	49%	Gary Johnson	7%	Darrell Castle	1%	14	600	4%
Remington Research Group	October 19–21, 2016	Hillary Clinton	37%	Donald Trump	48%	Gary Johnson	6%	Darrell Castle	2%	11	1,115	2.93%

===== Utah =====
Six-way race

Poll source	Date administered	Democrat	%	Republican	%	Libertarian	%	Green	%	Constitution	%	Independent	%	Lead margin	Sample size	Margin of error
Dan Jones & Associates	September 1–9, 2016	Hillary Clinton	24%	Donald Trump	39%	Gary Johnson	13%	Jill Stein	0%	Darrell Castle	2%	Evan McMullin	9%	15	605	± 3.98%
Public Policy Polling	August 19–21, 2016	Hillary Clinton	24%	Donald Trump	39%	Gary Johnson	12%	Jill Stein	5%	Darrell Castle	2%	Evan McMullin	9%	15	1,018	± 3.1%

== Endorsements ==
People

- Chuck Baldwin, 2008 Constitution Party Presidential Candidate
- Matthew Carr, writer at Liberty Hangout
- Sam Bushman, The host of Liberty Roundtable
- Dan Phillips MD, Professor of Psychiatry
- Rebecca Kiessling, International Pro-Life Speaker
- Glenn Beck, political commentator

Organizations

- Georgia Right to Life, An anti-abortion Political Action Committee
