= Independent American Party of Nevada =

- Chairman: Janine Hansen
- Founded: 1967; 59 years ago
- Headquarters: 186 Ryndon Unit 12, Elko, Nevada 89801
- Ideology: American nationalism Social conservatism Paleoconservatism
- Political position: Far-right
- National affiliation: Constitution Party
- Colors: Purple (de facto)

Website
- http://www.iapn.org

The Independent American Party of Nevada (IAPN) is a far-right American political party and the Nevada affiliate of the Constitution Party. The party was founded in 1967 and affiliated with the Constitution Party after its forming in 1999. It was one of four Constitution state parties that did not change their names to "Constitution Party".

== History ==
IAPN's high water mark was the 1974 Nevada gubernatorial election where IAPN's candidate, wealthy silver speculator James R. Houston, split the Republican vote and got 15.52% of the electorate, or 26,285 votes.

=== 1990s ===
The Nevada IAPN achieved some electoral success in the 1990s with the election of Chuck Horne as the mayor of Mesquite in a nonpartisan race.

=== 2010s ===
In the 2010 elections, three Independent American Party candidates were elected to local offices and one was re-elected. Several IAPN candidates also performed well in various state and legislative elections, including the election for Nevada State Assembly, District 33, where Janine Hansen won 30.81% of the vote and placed second in a three-way race. The IAP candidate for State Attorney General, Joel Hansen, also secured 7.81% of the vote.

At the close of registration in October 2010, the Independent American Party had a total number of 62,724 registered voters in the Party.

On October 25, 2013, the party membership experienced a small split with some members staying with the Independent American Party of Nevada and others forming a new Constitution Party of Nevada.

The party has a stronghold around Elko where the party often runs a full slate of candidates that see more success then compared with other parts of the state. There, state chairman Janine Hansen ran for the Nevada Senate for District 19. There he got 27% of the vote. Since 2012 the 19th District has been contested solely between the Republican and American Independent Party.

The party gained notoriety when Cliven Bundy, of Bundy standoff fame, came out as a registered member of the party, and spoke at a series of party events in 2018. Namely, Bundy was the keynote speaker of the party's convention on February 23, 2018, in Sparks. Prior to the convention 4.5% of registered voters in Nevada were registered with the Independent American Party. At the convention Bundy was hailed as a hero against federal "corruption and tyranny" by the party's chairman and spoke at length about his armed standoff with the Bureau of Land Management.

=== 2020s ===
The party also consistently competes for Nevada's 2nd congressional district and in 2020 the election was a three-way race with the Republicans, Democrats and the American Independent Party, with Janine Hansen running as the IAPN's candidate and getting 2.7% of the vote.

In the 2022 Reno mayoral election, the IAPN nominated Joaquin Roces, a National Alliance on Mental Illness employee with no prior political experience who ran on a platform of increasing homeless outreach, expanding funding to the fire-department, slashing casino subsidies, and expanding renewable energy in the city. He got 627 votes, or 1.35% of the electorate, in distant 8th place.

== Candidates ==
=== Presidential ticket ===
Year	Nominee	Votes
1968	George Wallace	20,432 (13.25%)
1976	Lester Maddox	1,497 (0.74%)
1992	Howard Phillips	677 (0.13%)
1996	Howard Phillips	1,732 (0.37%)
2000	Howard Phillips	621 (0.10%)
2004	Michael Peroutka	1,152 (0.14%)
2008	Chuck Baldwin	3,194 (0.33%)
2012	Virgil Goode	3,240 (0.32%)
2016	Darrell Castle	5,268 (0.46%)
2020	Don Blankenship	3,138 (0.22%)
2024	Joel Skousen	2,754 (0.19%)

=== Gubernatorial ===
Year	Nominee	Votes
1970	Daniel Hansen	5,415 (3.68%)
1974	James Ray Houston	26,285 (15.52%)
1978	Thomas F. Jefferson	3,282 (1.71%)
1994	Daniel Hansen	10,012 (2.64%)
1998	Chuck Horne	7,509 (1.73%)
2002	David Holmgren	7,047 (1.40%)
2006	Christopher Hansen	20,019 (3.44%)
2010	Floyd Fitzgibbons	5,049 (0.70%)
2014	David Lory VanDerBeek	14,536 (2.66%)
2018	Russell Best	10,076 (1.04%)
2022	Ed Bridges	9,918 (0.97%)

== Chairpersons ==
- Daniel Hansen: 1967–1980
- Joel Hansen: 2002–2004 and 2016–?
- Christopher Hansen: 2004–2008
- Mark Andrews: 2008–2009
- John Wagner: 2009–2016
- Janine Hansen: ?–present
