= Personal Choice Party =

Former American political party

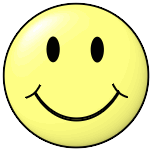
The logo of the Personal Choice Party is a generic stylized smiling face, similar to this one.

The Personal Choice Party (PCP) was a United States political party whose presidential candidate for 2004 qualified for the ballot in the state of Utah.

The first State Convention of the Personal Choice Party of Utah was held May 22, 2004, at Fairmont Park in Salt Lake City, Utah. The Personal Choice Party dates back to approximately 1997, and was organized by Dr. Ken Larsen, an ex-Mormon from Utah with a Ph.D. in Zoology from Brigham Young University.

Prior to forming the Personal Choice Party, Larsen was known as a political activist and frequent candidate for numerous political offices in Utah under the ballot lines of several minor parties including the Libertarian Party and the Independent American Party.

The party dissolved after the 2006 elections, and Larsen returned to the Libertarian Party, which nominated him for Governor of Utah in 2012.

== Philosophy ==
The Personal Choice Party asserted that everyone has free agency and individual rights. PCP expresses the philosophy of "live and let live." and demands that, "as long as I am not hurting anyone else, only I have the right to choose how I spend my time, my wealth, my life, my honor." It could be considered a libertarian party.

The preamble of the party's constitution – which specifies that it is the personal opinion of the party's founders – states:

The purpose of government is to prevent us from harming others and to prevent others from harming us. That is all we should expect or allow government to do. It is not the job of government to stop us from harming ourselves, or to make us help others. That is our responsibility as individuals.

== Issues ==
PCP supports drastic reductions in government. Many other positions have been attributed to PCP; however, PCP emphasizes that these positions are those of individual PCP members and not those of the party as a whole.

== Principal figures ==
- Charles Jay, 2004 Presidential nominee, and former candidate for 2004 Libertarian Party Vice President
- Marilyn Chambers Taylor, 2004 United States Vice-Presidential nominee
- Ken Larsen, Moderator (as opposed to Chairman), Utah Gubernatorial candidate

== Other election campaigns ==
The Personal Choice Party also ran candidates in the Utah 2004 senate elections and two of Utah’s three 2004 house elections. In these races, Republican incumbents were all reelected. PCP candidates Joe Labonte (United States Senate), Richard Soderberg (Utah United States House First District) and Curtis James (Utah United States House Third District) each received 1% of the vote.

The Personal Choice Party also ran candidates in some Utah elections in 2006. Its most notable candidate, Roger Ira Price, who ran for the United States Senate in 2006, received 1.6% of the vote. The party also ran candidates in some state legislature races. The most any candidate received was 4% of the vote. Some controversy was caused when it was alleged that some voters were confused by the party's positive name, including its smiley-face logo, which appeared on voting machines which, in Utah, give the option for voters to vote for all candidates in one political party at the same time. The party received 14% of the single-party votes in Salt Lake County, which some believe was caused by this confusion. However, many of these voters apparently voted for other candidates before officially submitting their vote. Party founder Larsen said that there was no confusion, mentioning that in 2004 and 2005 12% of Utah taxpayers agreed to donate $2 to the Personal Choice Party on their tax forms, though the party did not accept the funds.
