= Virgil Goode 2012 presidential campaign =

American political campaign

Virgil Goode for President
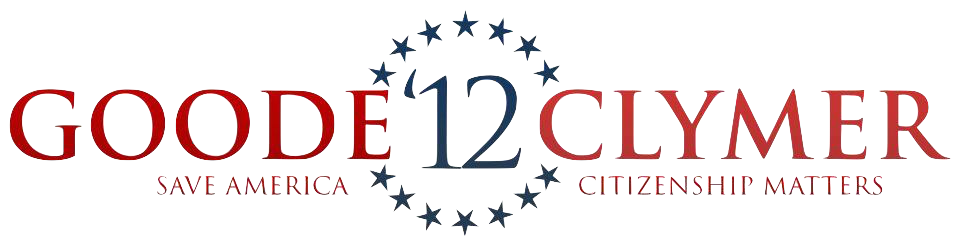
- Campaign: 2012 United States presidential election
- Candidate: Virgil Goode; U.S. House of Representative from Virginia (1997–2009); Jim Clymer
- Affiliation: Constitution Party
- Status: Lost election: November 6, 2012
- Headquarters: Rocky Mount, Virginia
- Key people: Lucy Goode (treasurer)
- Receipts: US$194,621 (2012-08-31)
- Slogan: Citizenship Matters

Website
- Virgil Goode for President (archived)

The Virgil Goode presidential campaign of 2012 began when former U.S. Congressman Virgil Goode of Virginia announced his decision to seek the 2012 presidential nomination of the Constitution Party in February 2012. During the nomination campaign, he put forth a four-point plank that included his plans to restrict immigration, balance the federal budget, decrease the size of government, and institute congressional term limits.

After winning the Constitution Party's presidential nomination on the first ballot at the party's April 2012 national convention, Goode chose outgoing party chairman Jim Clymer as his running mate. The ticket coordinated ballot access efforts to add to the 16 states on which they had already qualified. Goode focused on his home state of Virginia, where polls showed the ticket with five to nine percent support.

During the general election campaign, Goode participated in numerous media interviews and debated other third-party candidates. He continuously faced criticism that his campaign would act as a "spoiler", taking votes from presumptive Republican Party nominee Mitt Romney and helping President Barack Obama win re-election. In response, Goode argued he was in the race to win and would take votes away from both candidates. By discussing alternative solutions, restricting individual campaign donations to $200 and not accepting money from Political Action Committees, Goode cast himself as a grassroots "average citizen" that offered a distinct choice for voters outside of "Tweedledum and Tweedledee".

On Election Day, Goode appeared on 26 state ballots and was a write-in in an additional 18 states. He finished in fifth place with 122,001 votes for 0.09% of the total popular vote.

== Background ==
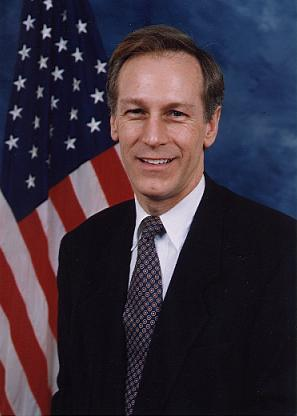
Official Congressional photo of Virgil Goode.

Before the 2012 election cycle, Virgil Goode, a Virginia native, had an extensive political career spanning four decades and three political affiliations. His career began in 1973, when, after serving in the Army National Guard and graduating from law school, he won a special election to the Senate of Virginia as an independent on a platform advocating the Equal Rights Amendment. Later joining the Democratic Party, Goode gained a reputation in the Virginia Senate as a proponent of collective bargaining rights, fiscal conservatism, gun rights, and the tobacco industry. Notably, while in office, he nominated L. Douglas Wilder for Lieutenant Governor of Virginia, and in 1989, backed Wilder's historic campaign for Governor of Virginia, which resulted in Wilder becoming the first elected African American governor of any U.S. state. Seeking higher office himself, Goode twice ran for U.S. Senate (in 1982 and 1994), losing in the Democratic primary both times. He elevated to the U.S. House of Representatives in 1996 upon his election as a Democrat to represent Virginia's 5th district. After being re-elected in 1998, Goode damaged relations with his party after supporting three of the four articles of impeachment against Democratic President Bill Clinton. Goode left the Democratic Party shortly thereafter, and once again became an independent.

As an independent in the House, Goode caucused with Republicans and was given a spot on the Appropriations Committee. He was re-elected to his congressional seat in 2000 as an independent, and before the 2002 election, he officially joined the Republican Party. After winning re-election in 2002, he was re-elected twice more as a Republican in 2004 and 2006. The 2006 election also saw the election of Democrat Keith Ellison, the first Muslim Representative. Upon hearing that Ellison planned to be sworn in on a Qur'an, Goode drew the ire of some of his House colleagues with a controversial letter describing the election of Muslims as an adverse effect of immigration policy. Throughout his time in Congress, Goode consistently voted to restrict immigration. In addition, he regularly voted against free trade agreements, and received a 100 percent approval rating from the National Right to Life Committee. He voted to authorize the War in Iraq, supported the USA PATRIOT Act, approved the Bush Tax Cuts, and voted against both the Emergency Economic Stabilization Act of 2008 and the General Motors and Chrysler bailouts. Goode participated in the libertarian-leaning Liberty Caucus, and donated to the 2008 presidential campaigns of fellow caucus members Ron Paul and Tom Tancredo. Facing a difficult battle for re-election in 2008, Goode lost his House seat to Democrat Tom Perriello by 727 votes. Initially, Goode filed papers with the Federal Election Commission to regain his seat in 2010, but he ultimately decided not to run.

== Early stages ==
Immediately following Goode's 2008 congressional loss, the Independent Political Report reported that sources within the Constitution Party speculated Goode would join their party and seek their 2012 presidential nomination. Over the next two years, he expressed interest in the party. In June 2009, he spoke at the Constitution Party's National Committee meeting, and was the keynote speaker at the May 2010 meeting. At the latter meeting, he paid the party's $35 dues and officially joined. Despite this, he remained a member of Republican Party as well and continued to pay dues to the Franklin County GOP. However, he later told The Daily Progress that his views were in greater accord with the Constitution Party on such issues as support for Arizona SB 1070 and opposition to the North American Free Trade Agreement.

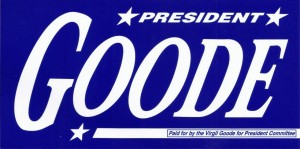
Logo from the early stages of Goode's candidacy

Shortly after joining, Goode moved up in the Constitution Party ranks. Party founder and Virginia chairman Howard Phillips named him to the National Committee in 2010, and in November of that year, National Committee Chairman Jim Clymer appointed him to the party's executive committee. The moves encouraged rumors that he was considering a 2012 presidential run. Such speculation continued in 2011, as Goode increased his visibility in paleoconservative circles. He participated in a Conservative Political Action Conference (CPAC) panel arguing against both illegal and legal immigration, and wrote an article for The American Conservative opposing the passage of the South Korea–United States Free Trade Agreement. In April 2011, after Goode delivered a speech at a Constitution Party meeting, the Constitution Party National Committee unanimously passed a resolution asking him to seek their presidential nomination. In a press release, the party said that he had "expressed a strong interest" in the nomination. Thereafter, Goode told The Roanoke Times that he would "consider it as the year progresses". Clymer informed the publication that "There's nothing that I can see now that would prevent him from getting the nomination were he to say he indeed wants it."

In reaction to the possibility, Goode's 2008 congressional campaign manager Tucker Watkins said Goode would be an upgrade from the Constitution Party's 2008 nominee Chuck Baldwin, who appeared on 37 state ballots and won 0.15 percent of the popular vote. However, Watkins admitted that he "can't imagine [Goode] flying all over the country". Madison Marye, who served with Goode in the Virginia Senate, felt it was likely Goode would run "because of his love for politics", and described him as a "political animal" that could energize a crowd. Hollins University political science professor Ed Lynch lauded Goode's potential appeal to the Tea Party movement and his "personal conversation" style but argued that his public speaking ability and strong Old Virginia accent could hurt his chances with the American audience. Political strategist David Saunders speculated that if Goode chose to run, he would take votes away from the Republicans in Virginia and possibly sway the state to the Democrats.

In November 2011, the Lancaster Intelligencer Journal covered a speech Goode delivered to the Lancaster County Constitution Party and noted that though he had yet to announce, he "sounded like a candidate". He discussed plans to cut government spending to the Department of Education, defense, and foreign aid; continued arguments against free trade agreements and immigration; and added his support for term limits in Congress. When asked about a presidential run, Goode commented, "I'll let people know [about a run] next year, by January or February.... We've got sure disaster with Obama, and it's only prolonged a little with the Republicans. But tough choices have to be made. The Constitution Party offers the best choice out there."

== Nomination campaign ==
On February 10, 2012, Goode's wife and campaign treasurer Lucy filed papers with the Federal Election Commission for Goode to seek the Constitution Party's 2012 presidential nomination. After the FEC received and posted the documents on their website four days later, the media reported on the update. The next day, Goode set up a campaign website and informed the press he would formally announce his candidacy on February 21 in front of Federal Hall National Memorial in New York City.

During his announcement, Goode noted that Federal Hall was where George Washington was sworn in as the first president in 1789. He listed the four planks of his platform including the return to limited government, which he asserted as forming the basis under which Washington and others founded the nation. In his call for a balanced federal budget, he argued, "we cannot wait five to ten years in the future to have a balanced budget; we must do that now." Moreover, he reaffirmed his plans to stop illegal immigration and reduce legal immigration, and again referenced Washington and the early congress in his endorsement for congressional term limits. On the same day as the announcement, Josh Krasuhaar of The Atlantic wrote an article describing Goode as the "prototype" of a successful third-party candidate. Though Krasuhaar conceded Goode's chances were slim, he argued that Goode as a populist, "would have the potential to get support from a swath of voters who would see both President Obama and Mitt Romney as elites disconnected from the concerns of working-class Americans".

In the days following the announcement, Goode received little media attention. However, he was featured in a Richmond Times Dispatch article referring to him as "Mr. Independent", and Wikinews published an interview with him in which he discussed his support for the Keystone Pipeline.

Ahead of the National Convention, Goode participated in a U.S. Taxpayers Party of Michigan-sponsored debate on March 31 with fellow Constitution Party candidates Robby Wells, Susan Ducey, and Laurie Roth. In an interview with The Roanoke Times after the debate, Goode judged the upcoming nomination as "a wide open affair [that] could go to any of the candidates". The Constitution Party chairman of Virginia Mitch Turner observed that Goode had an advantage over the other candidates as a former federal officeholder, but held the experience could also be construed as a disadvantage since purist party members might oppose him due to his votes in favor of military interventions and the USA PATRIOT Act.

== National convention ==
The 2012 Constitution Party National Convention was held April 18–21 in Nashville, Tennessee. Just prior to the nomination, 2008 vice presidential nominee Darrell Castle decided to enter the race, saying several convention delegates had urged him to run. Despite this, Goode was still able to win the nomination on the first ballot with 203 delegates. Castle came in second with 120, followed by Wells with 58, Ducey with 15, and Roth with 6. Goode became the party's first presidential nominee to have held elected office in the federal government.

In his acceptance speech, Goode thanked his opponents, and presented himself as an alternative to President Obama and presumptive Republican presidential nominee Mitt Romney. Hoping to differentiate himself, he said that unlike Obama and Romney, he supports cutting the budget for education, "No Child Left Behind", and foreign aid, as well as auditing the Federal Reserve, and ending Diversity Visas. In addition, he mentioned his time in Congress, highlighting his pro-life stance on abortion while expressing regret for his PATRIOT Act vote. To conclude the address, Goode discussed his campaign's refusal to accept PAC money and donations over $200, and proclaimed:

It's time that the average citizen had the same voice in government as the Oracle of Omaha, the head of Google, the head of Facebook and all those entities. Let's stand up for the average citizen and not the special few. Let's elect me and the Constitution Party's ticket in 2012 and we will give America the change that it is needed and it won't be the Barack Obama change of 2008.

Immediately following the speech, Goode spoke to Uncovered Politics about his proposals to improve the American economy. He listed a balanced federal budget as a "top priority" and said immigration should be limited to save "jobs for American citizens first".

Afterward, for the vice presidential nomination, the Constitution Party delegates picked Jim Clymer, Goode's preferred choice whose term as party chairman was expiring. In his acceptance speech, he said that his nomination was unexpected and that he looked forward to the campaign with both trepidation and eagerness. He referred to Goode as a "statesman", and expressed his belief that "we [The Constitution Party] have a presidential candidate who will carry the values of this party effectively ... has the ability to attract a wide segment of people ... and who has the credibility." Lastly, he called on supporters and party volunteers for assistance in ballot access efforts. By the end of the convention, the party had attained access in 16 states: Colorado, Florida, Idaho, Michigan, Mississippi, Missouri, Nevada, New Mexico, North Dakota, Ohio, South Carolina, South Dakota, Tennessee, Utah, Wisconsin, and Wyoming. According to The Roanoke Times, Clymer, a native of Pennsylvania, planned to personally focus on ballot access drives in Pennsylvania, Maryland, Delaware, and New Jersey.

== General election ==
Goode returned home after the convention, and participated in Constitution Party ballot access efforts in Virginia. Throughout the campaign, Goode focused much of his efforts on Virginia, driving around the state in his Honda Accord. In an interview with The Farmville Herald of Farmville, Virginia, published April 24, he said that ballot access would be the campaign's focus for the next two months, hoping to gain access in "at least 40 states" for the general election. He also told the newspaper that he wanted to use the national media for exposure, but would rely on the internet to reach out to potential supporters, particularly those of Ron Paul following the Republican National Convention. With Romney likely coming out of the convention as the GOP nominee, Goode told the Martinsville Bulletin that he also hoped to win support among those members of the Tea Party movement concerned about "Romneycare" and government spending. Additionally, he expressed his desire to appear in the national presidential debates, though he said it was a "tough row to hoe" due to the Commission on Presidential Debates's inclusion criteria of having enough ballot access to theoretically win the election and holding an average of 15 percent support in at least five national polls. Despite securing a spot on the New Mexico ballot to increase the ticket's total of ballot-qualified states to 17, the first criterion had not yet been met. Furthermore, by this point, Goode had not been included in any national polls, and so did not meet the second criterion either. Nevertheless, he did register five percent support in a late-April Public Policy Polling survey of Virginia voters. Though short of the debate requirements, if replicated in the election, it would meet scholar Walter Dean Burnham's five percent threshold for successful third party runs.

=== Exposure ===
In May, The Des Moines Register published an article titled, "Third Parties Goode News For Obama", which speculated Goode would draw votes from Romney, particularly in the swing state of Virginia, and thus help Obama win the election. The "spoiler" label followed Goode throughout the campaign, but he maintained he would take votes from both Romney and Obama, and felt confident in his ability to win. He reflected this sentiment during a May 13 interview on C-SPAN's Washington Journal, saying that he wanted to give voters a choice, and hoped to take enough votes from both the Republicans and Democrats in order to win the election. In addition, during the interview, to highlight his support for term limits, Goode announced that if elected, he would only seek one term; in contrast to President Obama, whom Goode criticized for focusing too much on re-election rather than effective policy.

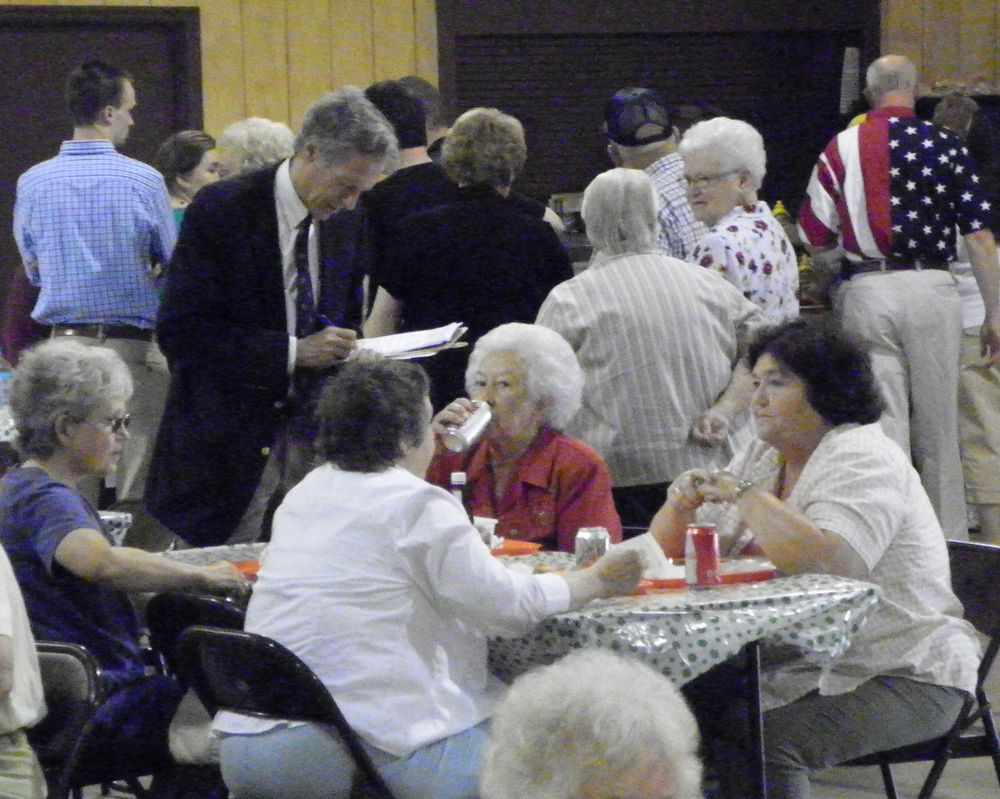
Goode collects signatures for his Virginia ballot access petition in May 2012.

After Obama announced his support for same-sex marriage in May, Goode held a press conference in Lynchburg, Virginia, affirming his opposition to the practice due to the "drain" of funds available for social security as a consequence of same-sex marriage benefits. He was also concerned about the effect on health insurance costs and state retirement plans. Moreover, Goode attacked Romney's record on the issue, referring to him as "the father of homosexual marriages" because of his issuance of same-sex marriage licenses during his term as governor of Massachusetts. Economic matters remained central to the Goode campaign.

Near the end of May, John Long, a columnist for The Roanoke Times compared Goode's campaign to the role of Virgil in Dante's Inferno, explaining he "eventually disappears, powerless to climb to the heights of Paradise. But he teaches the reader a thing or two before he fades away". At this time, Goode continued to work on ballot access with petitions circulating in Delaware, Hawaii, Illinois, Iowa, Kentucky, Maryland, New Hampshire, Pennsylvania, Vermont, and Virginia. In addition to these states, during an interview with the Independent Political Report, Goode announced plans to get on some state ballots as an independent candidate and to seek the nomination of the California-ballot qualified American Independent Party. Moreover, he mentioned that several lawsuits were pending to challenge certain state laws that made it difficult to achieve ballot access. In the interview, he discussed potentially going to Tampa during the Republican National Convention in an attempt to gain support from Ron Paul backers. He compared his views to those of Paul, affirming his support for a Federal Reserve audit, a non-interventionist foreign policy, and a return to the Gold Standard.

On Memorial Day, Goode spoke at a Veterans Memorial Program in Clarksville, Virginia. Afterwards, he told the South Hill Enterprise that Romney and Obama represented "Tweedledum and Tweedledee", criticizing both for putting forth unbalanced budgets, specifically mentioning the deficit in the proposed budget of Republican Congressman Paul Ryan. Elaborating on this criticism, during a June 5 interview with Star News, Goode said he supported cutting foreign aid and opposed the Ryan budget's proposed increases to defense, arguing "I'm pro-strong defense, but you can't get to a balanced budget unless you cut defense." The next day, Goode repeated this view during a meeting with the Rotary Club of Martinsville at the Virginia Museum of Natural History; however, he pledged that as president he would not seek cuts to military salaries or veterans' benefits. James Antle of The American Conservative discussed Goode's evolving views on defense matters and foreign policy. He observed that Goode had embraced non-interventionism, but still expressed the belief that pre-invasion Iraq had Weapons of Mass Destruction, and used a tone "a bit off for someone who is leading a party that truly advocates a humble foreign policy" when arguing the U.S. "send Iran a clear message that if we are assaulted, we will meet it and trump it". Discussing the comments, Antle's fellow American Conservative writer Daniel Lairson concluded "it doesn't make for much of a protest candidacy if the third party candidate can't make his differences with the major parties sufficiently clear."

=== On the campaign trail ===
The Constitution Party announced in its bimonthly newsletter that Goode would travel to Buffalo and Syracuse at the end of June to coordinate ballot access efforts with the Constitution Party of New York. Before this, he held a town hall meeting in Craig County, Virginia, and asked supporters to sign petitions. He noted that 10,000 signatures, with 400 per 11 of the state's congressional districts, were necessary to qualify for the Virginia ballot, but that the campaign planned to obtain more than necessary to account for ineligible signatures. Discussing the low level of media coverage for the campaign, he said it was the result of not having as much money as the Romney and Obama campaigns. Nevertheless, he also differentiated himself from other third-party candidates, saying he would not accept federal funding for his campaign. He also discussed at length his opposition to immigration. Arguing that Obama and the Democrats encourage immigration from Third World nations with a "socialist bent" to gain reliable supporters, Goode proclaimed that if immigration is not changed, the U.S. as a whole will move toward socialism. He added that Romney is "not going to do anything" about the issue either, because "the big funders of the Republican Party want low wages." Continuing on the issue of immigration after returning from his stop in New York, Goode held a press conference at the Comfort Inn in Roanoke to compare his views on President Obama's policy to not deport certain illegal immigrants, with Romney, who campaigned in nearby Salem. Goode proclaimed, "Unlike Romney, if I am elected President, I will promptly rescind the Obama amnesty order."

Endorsements
- Jay Anderson, former mayor of Columbia, Virginia
- Chuck Baldwin, pastor, radio host, and 2008 Constitution Party presidential nominee
- Daniel Cassidy, Renew America columnist, conservative activist, and former Republican staffer
- Howard Phillips, Constitution Party founder and 1992, 1996, and 2000 presidential nominee
- Sean Scallon, columnist for The American Conservative

At the beginning of July, Gallup included Goode in a national presidential poll; the first of his run. Along with Romney and Obama, he was included with the Libertarian Party presidential nominee Gary Johnson and the presumptive Green Party presidential nominee Jill Stein. Goode came in last place with less than 0.5 percent of respondents while Stein received one percent, and Johnson gauged three percent. Romney and Obama polled at 40 and 47 percent respectively. Shortly thereafter, Public Policy Polling showed Goode with nine percent in Virginia, taking most of his support from conservatives and Republicans. The Washington Times, the Richmond Times-Dispatch, and The Washington Post all published articles questioning whether Goode would cost Virginia for Romney. Though Goode continued to argue that he would take votes from both the Democrats and Republicans, Democratic strategist Paul Goldman labeled the run as a "net loss for Romney", and Republican consultant Chris LaCivita said, "if you want to see Barack Obama reelected president of the United States, do whatever you can for Virgil Goode." Nevertheless, the Times noted that third party support generally falls before the election, and that according to University of Mary Washington political science professor Stephen Farnsworth, even within Virginia, Goode is less-known outside his former congressional district. However, Bob Holsworth, a political analyst for Richmond's WTVR-TV said that Goode could make an impact in Virginia with much less than nine percent support, "if he pulls 2, 3, 4 percent, and in all likelihood those votes would come from people who are more likely to support Mitt Romney." Goode addressed this issue during a July 12 interview with Washington D.C.'s WMAL-AM radio, arguing that Romney "is like putty" and not much different from Obama. He described himself as an "average citizen" and said he was offering a choice to voters as a candidate not beholden to moneyed interests, and who is in favor of term limits and reducing the distribution of green cards.

It was revealed on July 19 that Goode had collected 14,000 Virginia signatures to surpass the outright 10,000 required to appear on the ballot. As a cushion, Goode expected to submit 20,000 before the August 24 deadline. According to The Washington Post, the Independent Greens of Virginia, a party not affiliated with the national Green Party, had helped secure a quarter of the signatures after Goode announced his support for light rail. After this, Goode campaigned in Birmingham, Alabama, and then traveled to Raleigh, where he filled out paperwork to appear as a recognized write-in candidate in North Carolina. Time Magazine ran an article on Goode on August 1, covering the campaign including a story of Goode nearly missing a speech after helping a dog that a truck had stricken. Discussing his limits on fundraising with Time, Goode asserted, "if you want big money candidates, you've got two great ones running," referencing Romney and Obama. After Goode submitted 20,000 signatures to appear on the Virginia ballot, the Virginia Board of Elections and Attorney General Ken Cuccinelli initiated an investigation into alleged petition fraud and forgery, seeing inconsistencies in the ballot and believing many of the signatures collected were fraudulent. The Goode campaign rejected these claims and argued the investigation was politically motivated.

In August, Goode made stops in Kentucky, Illinois, and Iowa before campaigning in the West. The Salt Lake Tribune previewed his western campaign swing. On the trail, after departing the Midwest, Goode appeared outside the State Capitol in Cheyenne, Wyoming, where he spoke before a crowd of 20 supporters, characterizing himself as "a true grassroots president who will answer the telephone from somebody sitting in this audience ... as quick as [he] would take a call from somebody like Warren Buffett or a heavy hitter from Bain Capital." Next, he held a town hall meeting with about 100 people in Bountiful, Utah, before stopping in Reno, Nevada to field questions at the Reno Town Mall. Thereafter, Goode arrived in California to seek the nomination of the ballot-qualified American Independent Party. After participating in a series of debates with America's Party nominee Tom Hoefling, Goode attended the party's nominating convention at Perkos Restaurant in Sacramento. At the event, Hoefling won the nomination unanimously over Goode, guaranteeing the Constitution Party ticket would not appear on the California ballot. Goode later traveled to Arizona where he met with Maricopa County Sheriff Joe Arpaio to discuss illegal immigration and Arpaio's investigation of the authenticity of Barack Obama's birth certificate. He finished his trip with a stop in New Mexico, meeting with leaders of the state Constitution Party to discuss the strategy of the campaign's final two months. After returning home to Virginia, Goode spoke at the annual Labor Day event in Buena Vista. After Labor Day, the Virginia Board of Elections certified Goode for the Virginia ballot despite the ongoing fraud investigation against his campaign. However, facing increased scrutiny, the campaign withdrew its Pennsylvania ballot access drive due to a lack of valid signatures, but secured access in New Jersey, Washington, Minnesota, Iowa, New York, and Louisiana. FEC reports through August showed the campaign raised $15,000, Goode himself added $40,000, and the campaign had $8,430 on hand.

=== Media campaign ===
After Labor Day, the Goode campaign launched a media campaign. He was supposed to appear on the September 5 edition of Special Report with Bret Baier, but it was bumped due to the 2012 Democratic National Convention. After appearing the Ohio Constitution Party State convention, he taped Stossel on September 11 in New York along with fellow presidential candidates Gary Johnson of the Libertarian Party and Stewart Alexander of Socialist Party USA. On the episode, which aired September 13, Goode discussed the Constitution Party platform and the debate between the Founding Fathers on term limits. He engaged with Alexander and Johnson on the National Defense Authorization Act and disputed Johnson's claim that Thomas Jefferson smoked cannabis. Goode appeared live on The Last Word with Lawrence O'Donnell on September 11 and responded to media personality and Romney supporter Donald Trump who tweeted "Republicans must get Virgil Goode out of the race in Virginia. He will take votes away from @MittRomney." Goode said he was "not too scared", and argued that Romney should listen more to "people on the street" than Trump. That same day, Paul Gottfried praised the Goode campaign in an article in The American Conservative. On Constitution Day, September 17, the campaign held a moneybomb. Meanwhile, the campaign secured ballot access in Rhode Island, Alabama, and New Hampshire, raising the total number of ballot-qualified states to 26, the final count. Despite Goode's appearances in the media, Pew Research Center revealed on September 19 that only nine percent of the voters knew of Goode.

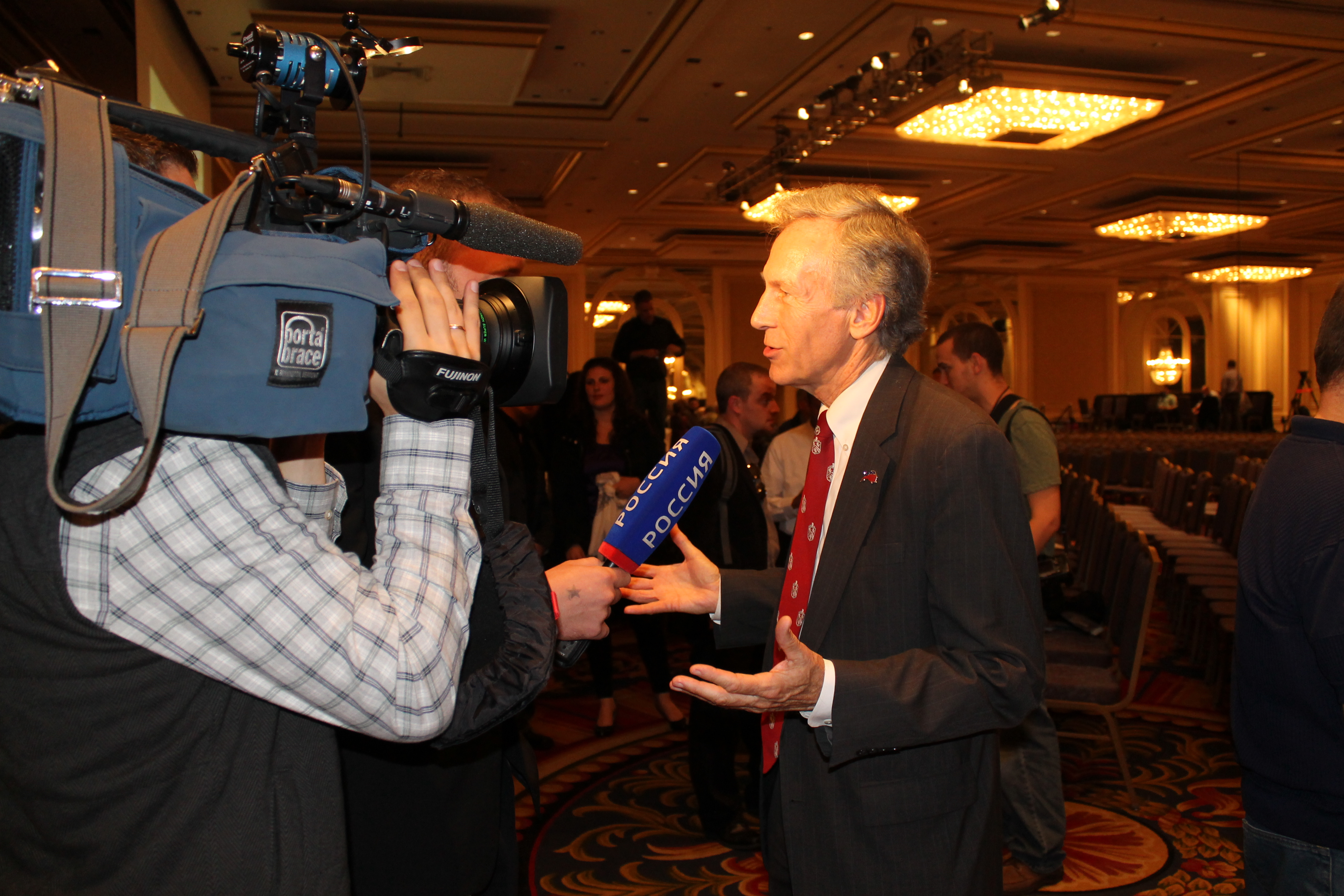
Goode speaks to the media.

Ballot access Write-in status No ballot access

The Washington Post published a feature on Goode on September 23. It followed Goode on a campaign trip in Virginia, finding "[h]e is his own driver, strategist, scheduler, press man." Throughout the trip, Goode encountered voters concerned that he would take votes that would otherwise go to Romney. He countered this by arguing that he would take votes from both Romney and Obama and that there was little difference between Obama and Romney particularly on immigration. However, during a visit to a barber shop, Goode met with two elderly men, who say they would vote for Goode. Goode hypothesized with The Post that he could possibly win Virginia with 38 percent of the vote. An Associated Press report found that several people Goode encountered while campaigning in Virginia thought he was running to regain his old congressional seat. Salon also interviewed Goode for an article published September 29. When asked who he would vote for if he had to pick between Romney and Obama, he said he would write-in himself "because Virgil Goode is the best choice for president". On September 30, he spoke with Newsplex and said that though he could not win the popular vote, he believed he could win the election through the Electoral College. He argued, "[i]f grassroots America wakes up and says, 'Look, we want someone that's for the U.S. citizen first and for grassroots America,' then they're going to vote for Virgil Goode." That same day, Goode appeared on Washington Journal on C-SPAN, taking questions from callers and host Steve Scully.

Goode began October with a trip to the Wayne County Agricultural Fair in Goldsboro, North Carolina. He then campaigned in South Carolina and Georgia and attended the Florida State Constitution Party Convention. The party qualified for write-in status in many states in which ballot access efforts fell short. Concerns grew about the Goode campaign's impact on the race, particularly in Virginia. State GOP chairman Pat Mullins proclaimed, "A vote for Virgil Goode is a vote for Barack Obama." Goode felt the GOP attacks were an overreaction, arguing that he was more likely to receive votes from "disgruntled Democrats" and non-voters than Republicans. He disputed the "spoiler" label on CNN's The Situation Room, arguing that he was "doing the right thing" by running because it would "help America if we can get a lot of votes". He added that if he were elected president, "it would be a tremendous help" because "it would shake up Washington; an average citizen would be president instead of someone that is backed by the Super PACs." Republican National Committee Chairman Reince Priebus asserted that third-party candidates like Goode would be "non-factors" in the race. Goode spoke before the National Press Club on October 12 and remarked that he was "optimistic" his campaign would have a "strong showing" on Election Day. Again addressing the "spoiler" issue, he held that balancing the federal budget and securing jobs for American citizens were more important issues than who becomes president.

=== Debate stage ===
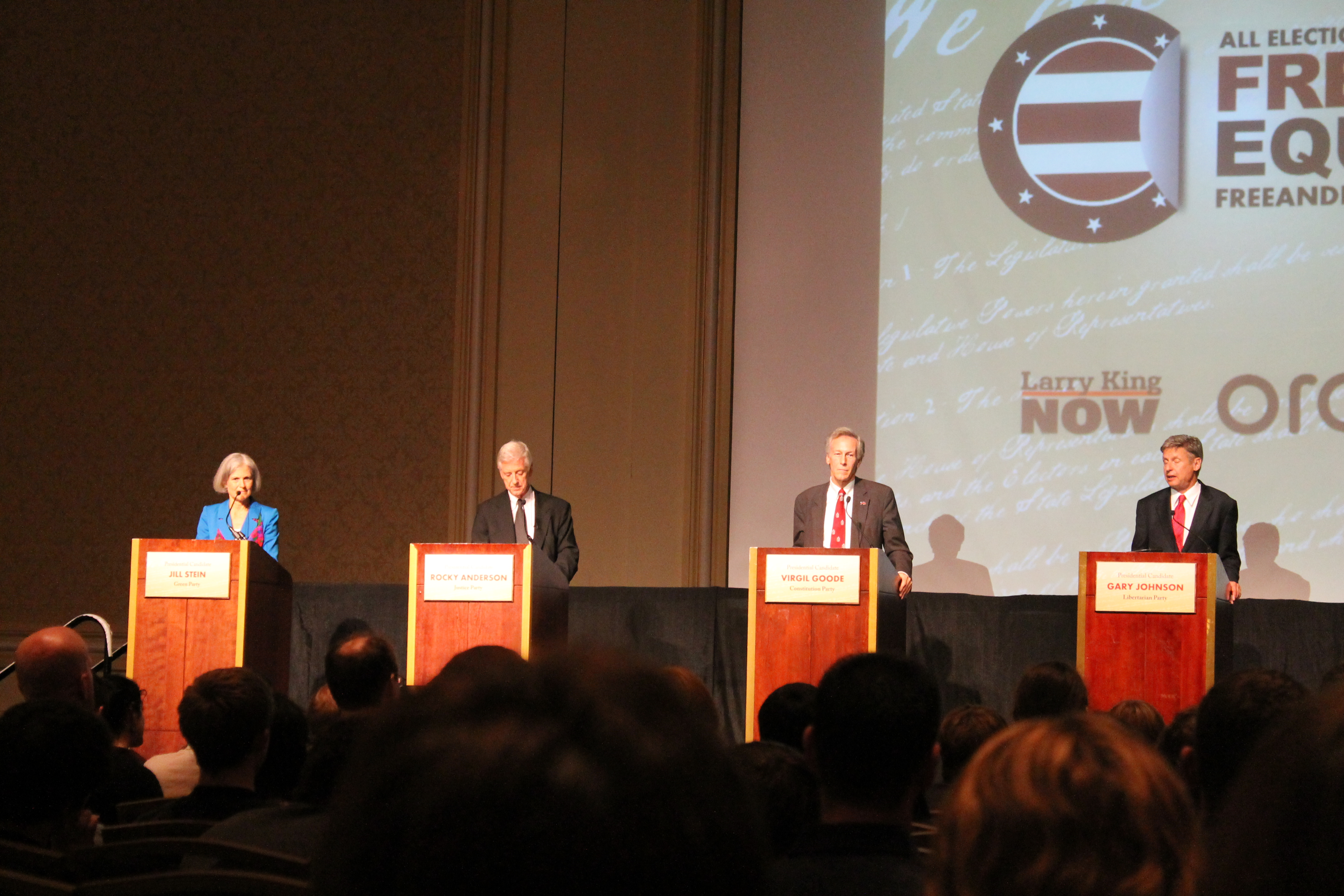
Goode participates in the October 23 debate with Jill Stein, Rocky Anderson, and Gary Johnson.

After the Commission on Presidential Debates held its second official presidential debate on October 16, Goode participated in the Democracy Now! "Expanding the Debate" program in which he, Green Party nominee Jill Stein, and Justice Party nominee Rocky Anderson received an opportunity to respond to the questions and answers featured in the official debate. During the discussion, Goode agreed with Rocky Anderson on the issue of free trade agreements, stating that he consistently voted against such agreements while in Congress. He expressed an opposition to illegal immigration and endorsed reducing legal immigration in order to secure jobs for American workers. Concerning the Libyan Civil War, Goode proclaimed that he would not have been involved without a formal declaration of war from Congress. Hearkening back to his earlier endorsement of the Equal Rights Amendment, Goode expressed support for "equal pay for equal work". Goode criticized Romney for his "flip-flop" on gun rights and said he was the only "candidate in this race that has had consistent and solid top ratings by the Gun Owners of America, NRA, Citizens Defense League, Second Amendment groups."

On October 23, Free & Equal Elections Foundation hosted a debate that featured Goode along with Stein, Johnson, and Anderson. It aired live on C-SPAN and was moderated by Larry King. Goode differentiated himself from the other candidates on the issue of drugs, proclaiming, "unlike Gary, unlike Rocky, and unlike Jill I am not for legalizing drugs. If you want that don't vote for me." He drew jeers from the Chicago crowd when he said he would defund Planned Parenthood after being asked a question about the war on drugs. Addressing college tuition, he said the United States would be like post-World War I Germany if it expanded the Pell Grant program. A poll of viewers conducted following the debate determined the two candidates that would advance to a later debate. Goode finished in fourth place and so did not advance. After the debate, Goode attended the Tums Fast Relief 500 NASCAR event in Martinsville, Virginia where he handed out campaign literature to those in attendance.

Again with Johnson, Stein, and Anderson, Goode participated in the November 4 third party debate in Washington D.C. at Busboys and Poets moderated by consumer advocate and four time presidential candidate Ralph Nader. During the first segment in which Nader asked a series of lightning questions, Goode expressed opposition to D.C. statehood, arguing it should be part of Maryland; indicated opposition to lessening restrictions on the production of industrial hemp; and said "pass" when asked whether human activity contributed to global warming and climate change. During the expanded answer segment, Goode discussed the Fair Tax that Johnson promoted and said he found the idea intriguing but wanted to bring down the sales tax rate before supporting it. On foreign policy, Goode expressed objection to the U.S. entering into the Kyoto Protocol unless countries like China and India entered as well, stated opposition to all U.S. foreign aid, and supported a reduction in military spending. Specifically, he said he wanted to cut all government programs "across the board" except for veterans services. Moreover, Goode adamantly endorsed the banning of Super PACs, arguing that billionaires and elites had too much influence over the process. Addressing the wasted vote theory, Goode exclaimed, "if that's your philosophy, go ahead and vote for Obama and Romney; it's not a dime's worth of difference between them!" He offered "if you want someone with heart, soul, and conviction, vote for Virgil Goode or consider one of these three candidates [at the debate]."

Wikinews afforded Goode, Anderson, and Tom Hoefling (candidates excluded from the second Free and Equal Debate) the opportunity to give their "final plea" to voters on the eve of Election Day. Goode wrote:

Virgil Goode is the only candidate who will stop illegal immigration and block automatic citizenship for children born in the US of illegal aliens. He is also the only candidate who will protect jobs for US citizens by stopping so many green card holders from entering the United States. Lastly, he will work to stop the domination by Big Money PACs of federal elections. Save America and Vote for Virgil Goode.

== Results ==
On Election Day, November 6, with the Goode–Clymer ticket on the ballot in 26 states and available for write-in in 18 others, Goode received 122,001 votes nationwide, 4,675 of which were write-ins. This constituted 0.09% of the popular vote. Overall, Goode finished fifth among the presidential candidates, behind winner President Barack Obama, runner up Mitt Romney, third place Gary Johnson, and fourth place Jill Stein. For the first time since 2000, the Constitution Party ticket received fewer votes than the Green Party ticket, with the latter receiving 347,239 more votes than the Goode ticket. Goode's vote total and percentage was the lowest for a Constitution Party nominee since Howard Phillips received 98,020 votes in 2000. The ticket received its highest percentage in South Dakota, where Goode won 0.65% of the vote. Next highest was Wyoming, where Goode received 0.59%. The ticket won over 2% of the vote in four counties: Franklin County, Virginia (2.58%); Carroll County, Virginia (2.17%); Esmeralda County, Nevada (2.08%); and Craig County, Virginia (2.06%). Franklin County was part of Goode's former congressional district.

== Aftermath ==
Following the election, Goode sent an e-mail to President Obama congratulating him on his victory. Goode remains a member of the Constitution Party and continues to serve on its executive committee. For the 2016 presidential election, Goode endorsed Republican front-runner Donald Trump in a November 2, 2015 op-ed for Breitbart, praising Trump's views on immigration and trade.
