= 2006 United States Senate election in Utah =

- November 7, 2006
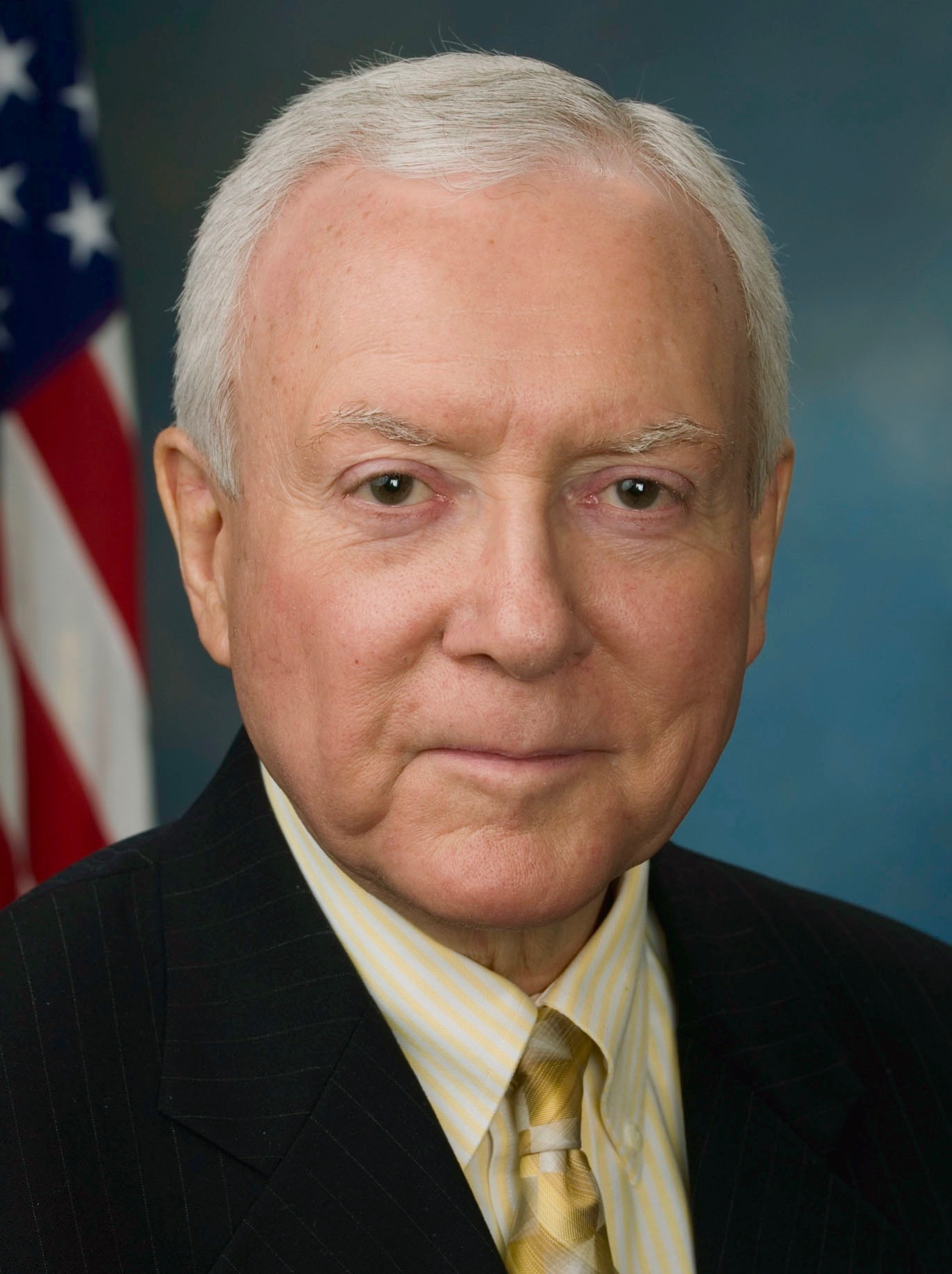

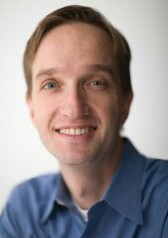
Nominee	Orrin Hatch	Pete Ashdown
Party	Republican	Democratic
Popular vote	356,238	177,459
Percentage	62.36%	31.06%
- County results Hatch: 40–50% 50–60% 60–70% 70–80% 80–90% Ashdown: 40–50%
U.S. senator before election
Orrin Hatch
Republican
Elected U.S. Senator
Orrin Hatch
Republican

The 2006 United States Senate election in Utah was held November 7, 2006. Incumbent Republican Orrin Hatch won re-election to a sixth term. Hatch won all but one county with 60% to 70% of the vote. Ashdown won only Summit County by 342 votes.

== Major candidates ==
The filing deadline for major party candidates was March 17, 2006.

=== Democratic ===
- Pete Ashdown, the founder and CEO of Utah's oldest Internet service provider, XMission.

=== Republican ===
- Orrin Hatch, incumbent U.S. Senator first elected in 1976

== General election ==
=== Polling ===
Source	Date	Hatch (R)	Ashdown (D)	Bradley (C)	Hatch (DG)	Price (PC)	Seely (L)
Dan Jones & Associates	March 30, 2006	57%	16%	1%	1%	<1%	1%
Mason-Dixon/Salt Lake Tribune	July 3, 2006	67%	23%	—	—	—	—
Deseret Morning News/KSL-TV	July 26, 2006	63%	21%	3%	<1%	<1%	1%
Mason-Dixon/Salt Lake Tribune	August 28, 2006	61%	27%	—	—	—	—
Deseret Morning News/KSL-TV	September 30, 2006	62%	25%	1%	<1%	0%	1%
Mason-Dixon/Salt Lake Tribune	November 1, 2006	61%	31%	—	—	—	—

=== Predictions ===
Source	Ranking	As of
The Cook Political Report	Solid R	November 6, 2006
Sabato's Crystal Ball	Safe R	November 6, 2006
Rothenberg Political Report	Safe R	November 6, 2006
Real Clear Politics	Safe R	November 6, 2006

=== Results ===
General election results
Party	Candidate	Votes	%	±%
Republican	Orrin Hatch (Incumbent)	356,238	62.36%	−3.22%
Democratic	Pete Ashdown	177,459	31.06%	−0.45%
Constitution	Scott Bradley	21,526	3.77%	
Personal Choice	Roger Price	9,089	1.59%	
Libertarian	Dave Seely	4,428	0.78%	−1.35%
Green	Julian Hatch	2,512	0.44%	
Majority		178,779	31.30%	−2.77%
Turnout		571,252		
Republican hold		Swing		

==== Counties that flipped from Republican to Democratic ====
- Summit (largest municipality: Park City)

== See also ==
- 2006 United States Senate elections
