= 1974 Nevada gubernatorial election =

- November 5, 1974
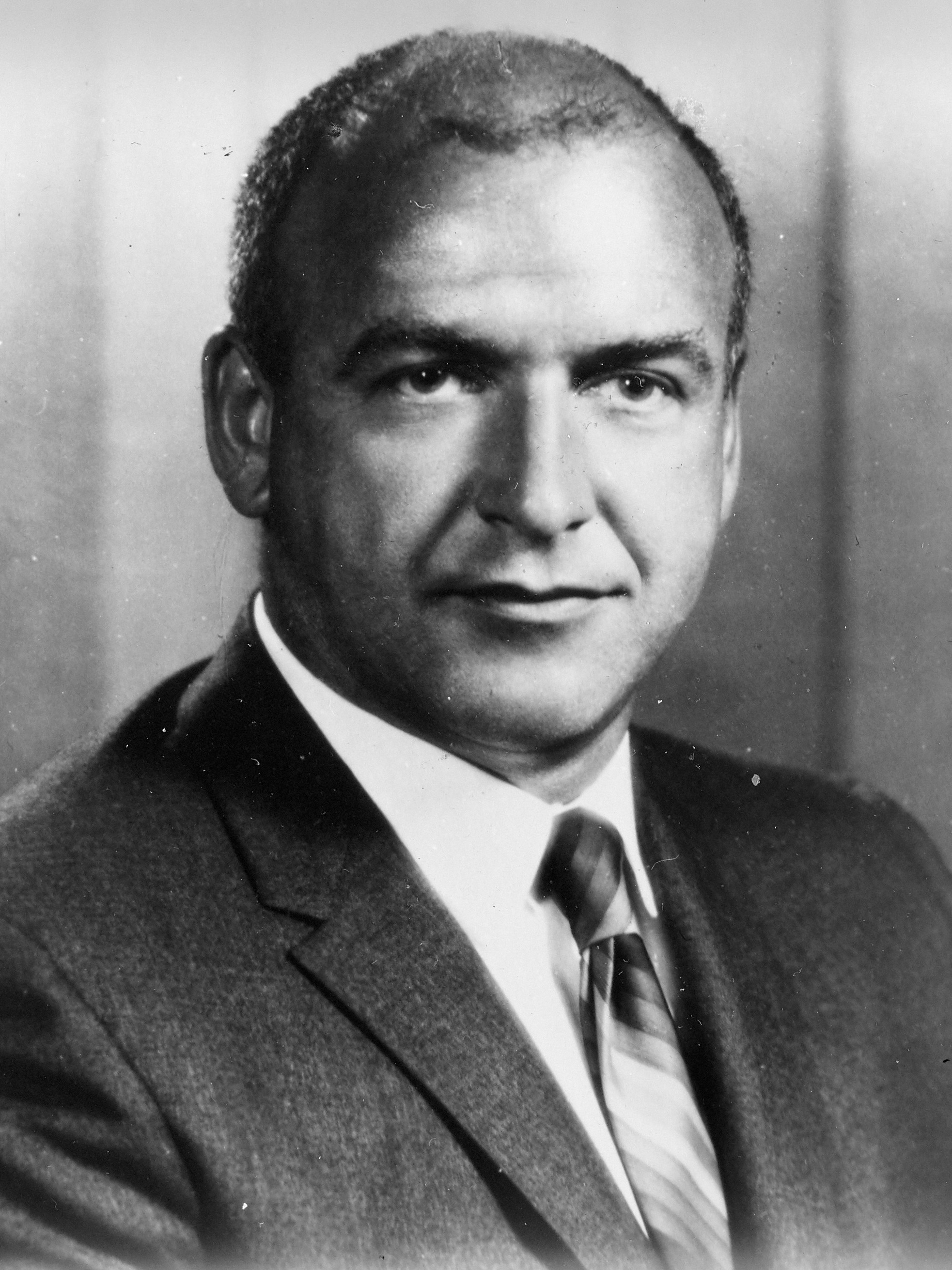

Nominee	Mike O'Callaghan	Shirley Crumpler	James Houston
Party	Democratic	Republican	Independent American
Popular vote	114,114	28,959	26,285
Percentage	67.38%	17.10%	15.52%
- County results O'Callaghan: 50–60% 60–70% 70–80% 80–90%
Governor before election
Mike O'Callaghan
Democratic
Elected Governor
Mike O'Callaghan
Democratic

The 1974 Nevada gubernatorial election occurred on November 5, 1974. Incumbent Democrat Mike O'Callaghan successfully ran for re-election to a second term as governor of Nevada, defeating Republican nominee Shirley Crumpler and Independent American nominee James Hay Houston.

== Campaign ==
=== Democratic primary ===
There was no Democratic primary, as the Nevada Democratic Party fully committed behind incumbent governor Mike O'Callaghan and expected an easy re-election due to O'Callaghan being young, just 45 at the time, and running a scandal-less first term, as well as being generally charismatic and likeable.

=== Republican primary ===
Four Republicans sought their party's nod for nomination with two frontrunners: Bill Bickerstaff from Sparks and Shirley Crumpler, a 39-year-old Las Vegas-based real estate developer and tax consultant. Crumpler won. She was the first woman ever nominated for governor of Nevada, and the first Republican woman ever nominated for governor in the nation.

=== Other ===
The Independent American Party of Nevada nominated James R. Houston, a wealthy 38-year-old silver speculator, for governor.

=== General election ===
The central issue of the general election was the fact Crumpler was a woman. She said in an interview with The New York Times that convincing voters that a woman can handle the burden of holding political office as well as a man was "the hard part" of her campaign. Crumpler centered her campaign on accusing O'Callaghan of neglecting his constituents during his election campaign, and that he only implemented policy for popularity boosts for re-election. O'Callaghan defeated Crumpler by 85,155 votes.

== Results ==
Nevada gubernatorial election, 1974
Party	Candidate	Votes	%	±%
Democratic	Mike O'Callaghan (inc.)	114,114	67.38%	+19.28%
Republican	Shirley Crumpler	28,959	17.10%	−26.71%
Independent American	James Ray Houston	26,285	15.52%	+11.84%
Majority		85,155	50.28%	
Total votes		169,358	100.00%	
Democratic hold		Swing	+45.62%	

=== County results ===
County	Mike O'Callaghan Democratic		Shirley Crumpler Republican		James Ray Houston Independent American		Margin		Total votes cast
County	#	%	#	%	#	%	#	%	Total votes cast
Carson City	5,099	59.50%	1,723	20.11%	1,748	20.40%	3,351 (Note: Margin over Houston)	39.10%	8,570
Churchill	2,806	65.01%	603	13.97%	907	21.01%	1,899	44.00%	4,316
Clark	56,614	69.28%	12,509	15.31%	12,589	15.41%	44,025	53.88%	81,712
Douglas	2,470	55.37%	1,270	28.47%	721	16.16%	1,200	26.90%	4,461
Elko	3,696	71.66%	873	16.93%	589	11.42%	2,823	54.73%	5,158
Esmeralda	237	59.10%	40	9.98%	124	30.92%	113	28.18%	401
Eureka	296	60.16%	126	25.61%	70	14.23%	170	34.55%	492
Humboldt	1,515	65.50%	487	21.05%	311	13.45%	1,028	44.44%	2,313
Lander	787	62.36%	201	15.93%	274	21.71%	513	40.65%	1,262
Lincoln	1,010	80.16%	149	11.83%	101	8.02%	861	68.33%	1,260
Lyon	2,696	67.70%	612	15.37%	674	16.93%	2,022	50.78%	3,982
Mineral	1,913	69.82%	314	11.46%	513	18.72%	1,400	51.09%	2,740
Nye	1,478	66.82%	342	15.46%	392	17.72%	1,086	49.10%	2,212
Pershing	816	65.49%	225	18.06%	205	16.45%	591	47.43%	1,246
Storey	419	68.46%	90	14.71%	103	16.83%	316	51.63%	612
Washoe	29,440	65.89%	8,815	19.73%	6,425	14.38%	20,625	46.16%	44,680
White Pine	2,822	71.61%	580	14.72%	539	13.68%	2,242	56.89%	3,941
Totals	114,114	67.38%	28,959	17.10%	26,285	15.52%	85,155	50.28%	169,358

==== Counties that flipped from Republican to Democratic ====
- Carson City
- Douglas
- Eureka
- Washoe

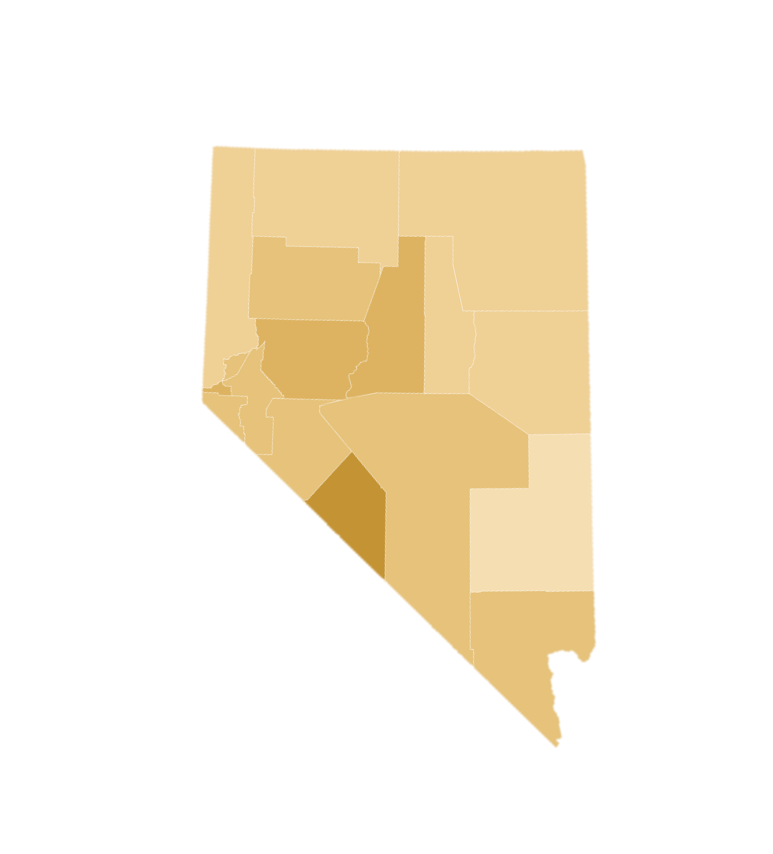
Houston's performance by county Legend: 30-35%; 25-30%; 20-25%; 15-20%; 10-15%; 5-10%
