= 1998 Pennsylvania lieutenant gubernatorial election =

The Pennsylvania lieutenant gubernatorial election of 1998 was held on November 3, 1998. In Pennsylvania, the Lieutenant Governor is elected on the same ticket as the Governor, so the only campaign for this office was the primary election.

== Democratic primary ==
=== Candidates ===
- Marjorie Margolies-Mezvinsky, former US Representative (from Montgomery County)
- Ron Panza, Green Tree Borough Councilor (from Allegheny County)
- Al Penksa, Cambria County Controller

Pennsylvania Lt. Governor primary election, 1998
Party	Candidate	Votes	%
Democratic	Marjorie Margolies-Mezvinsky	265,573	52.98
Democratic	Ron Panza	154,710	30.87
Democratic	Al Penksa	80,936	16.15

== Republican primary ==
- Mark Schweiker, incumbent Lt. Governor, was unopposed for the nomination.

== See also ==
- 1998 Pennsylvania gubernatorial election
