= Chuck Baldwin 2008 presidential campaign =

Political campaign for United States presidency

Baldwin 2008
- Campaign: U.S. presidential election, 2008
- Candidate: Chuck Baldwin, 2004 Constitution Party Vice Presidential nominee Darrell Castle, Lawyer
- Affiliation: Constitution Party
- Status: Lost election November 4, 2008
- Headquarters: Pensacola, FL
- Key people: Mary Starrett (National Communications Director); Lowell Patterson (Campaign Finance Director)
- Receipts: US$.131 (2008-08-31)

Website
- baldwin08.com (archived - November 4, 2008)

The Chuck Baldwin presidential campaign of 2008 began April 10, 2008 as pastor and radio host Chuck Baldwin of Florida announced his candidacy for the Constitution Party presidential nomination. He previously served as the party's vice-presidential nominee in 2004. Baldwin's main opposition for the nomination was former ambassador Alan Keyes, who had just left the Republican Party. After a campaign touting his stands on civil liberties, foreign affairs, and religion, Baldwin won the nomination at the April 26 Constitution Party National Convention. Attorney Darrell Castle was selected as his running mate.

During the general election, Baldwin expressed paleo-conservative positions on a number of issues including protectionism on trade, nonintervention in foreign affairs, religious practice in the public sphere, and nativism. He cast himself as a close ally of 2008 Republican presidential candidate, Representative Ron Paul, who ultimately endorsed Baldwin's campaign.

With 199,750 votes, about 0.15% of the total, Baldwin finished fifth in the race, ahead of Green Party nominee Cynthia McKinney, but behind both independent Ralph Nader and Libertarian Bob Barr, as well as Republican nominee John McCain and the eventual winner, Democratic nominee Barack Obama.

== Background ==
Chuck Baldwin was initially a Democrat, but changed his party affiliation to Republican in 1980. In the 1970s, he founded Crossroad Baptist Church in Pensacola, Florida, which President Ronald Reagan recognized for its growth and influence. As a Republican, Baldwin headed the Florida branch of Moral Majority, which promoted social conservatism. He also hosted a radio show called Chuck Baldwin Live, which focused on conservative issues. It made its national radio debut on the Genesis Communications Network in 2001.

Baldwin left the Republican Party in 2004, believing it had become a "second big-government, big-spending party" that could be characterized as "more liberal than the Democratic Party...in practice." He joined the Constitution Party, but still considered himself a political independent. That year, Constitution Party presidential candidate Michael Peroutka asked Baldwin to be his running mate. The ticket won the nomination at the 2004 Constitution Party National Convention. In the general election, they received 143,630 popular votes for 0.12%.

== Early stages ==
While considering a run for president, during an October 2006 interview with The Conservative President 2008 website, Baldwin expressed his frustration with the Republican Party, which he believed was on a course of "self-destruction" and that was only kept afloat by the "absurd liberalism of Democrats." He praised Congressmen Tom Tancredo and Ron Paul as well as activists Pat Buchanan and Alan Keyes, but stated that the Republican Party had steered too far to the left for him to support any of their candidates for president. When asked if he would run for president in 2008 he stated that he had "no desire to run" but that he was "always open to God's will." Baldwin endorsed Ron Paul for the Republican presidential nomination in a message posted to YouTube on December 19, 2007.

During a March 25, 2008 interview with Miller Politics, two weeks before Baldwin officially entered the race, he commended Alan Keyes as a possible Constitution Party candidate but stated that he "needs to clarify his foreign policy positions for the party." He described Libertarian Party candidate Bob Barr as a "very attractive candidate" whom he "like[s]...very much." When asked about his own presidential aspirations, he responded by saying that "There are many great people in our party that, in my opinion, are much more qualified [to be the presidential nominee] than I am. I have always tried to be open to God's will. At this time, however, I have no inclination that this is God's will for me."

== 2008 Constitution Party National Convention ==
Baldwin announced on April 10, 2008, that he would seek the Constitution Party presidential nomination at the party's April 23–26 convention in Kansas City, Missouri. His run was believed to have arisen from draft efforts within the Constitution Party, who feared the party would nominate a pro-Iraq War candidate like Alan Keyes. Until the convention, Baldwin did not campaign and in an April 17 interview with Miller Politics, he stated that he was "not running" but merely placing his name into consideration, "trusting that God will reveal His will accordingly."

During the convention, the party's founder Howard Phillips endorsed Baldwin and gave a passionate speech in which he referred to Keyes as "the Neocon candidate" who "lingered in the Republican Party until a week ago." Afterwards, Baldwin defeated Keyes, 383.8 to 125.7, winning approximately 74% of the delegates. He won the majority of delegates from most states with the exceptions of Missouri, Maryland, and Oklahoma, where Keyes narrowly edged Baldwin. At Baldwin's request, the delegates then chose attorney Darrell Castle of Tennessee as his running mate.

== General election campaign ==
Though Baldwin was not included on many mainstream polls, a May 2008 Fox News opinion poll revealed favorable news for the campaign. It showed that 47% of the public were open to voting for a third-party presidential candidate such as Baldwin, compared to 39% who were not. Moreover, a Zogby poll discovered that 42% of conservatives (whom the Baldwin campaign targeted) said they would never vote for the presumptive Republican presidential nominee John McCain and found that 86% of "very conservative" respondents were displeased.

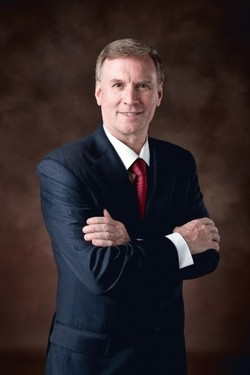
Campaign photo of Baldwin.

Baldwin expressed his own discontent with the Republican Party in a May 22 interview with Montana News. He expressed frustration with evangelicals who "coalesc[e] around John McCain" despite his "twenty-plus year track record of liberal policies." Baldwin highlighted globalism as the main threat to the nation stating that "Immigration, the U.N...., NATO, NAFTA, CAFTA, the North American Union, the Superhighway, the war in Iraq, China's threat to our peace...are connected" through globalism. Baldwin stated that Iran would only be a threat "by sneaking people into our country. And that would be far more difficult with a sealed border." He stated that the border could be sealed by deploying troops to those areas.

At the end of May and the beginning of June, several controversial developments concerning the Baldwin campaign hit the press. Comments surfaced that were made by Baldwin, raising the possibility of a 9/11 conspiracy theory of a controlled demolition stating, "I don't know whether there was any kind of an inside apparatus involved in this or not... If there's duplicity involved in some kind of conspiracy, then let's find out who it is and prosecute whoever's involved."

Endorsements
- Peter Brimelow, founder of VDARE.
- Jerome Corsi, frequent World Net Daily contributor and author of The Obama Nation and coauthor of Unfit for Command
- Fmr. Rep. William E. Dannemeyer (R-CA)
- John Derbyshire
- Mark Dice, leader of The Resistance for Christ
- Fmr. Rep. Bob Dornan (R-CA)
- Paul Gottfried
- Fmr. Rep. Mel Hancock (R-MO)
- John Hostettler, former U.S. congressman from Indiana
- Jack Hunter
- Alex Jones, paleoconservative radio host
- Fmr. Rep. John LeBoutillier (R-NY)
- Ron Paul, U.S. congressman from Texas and 2008 Republican presidential candidate
- Howard Phillips, chairman of The Conservative Caucus and 1992, 1996, and 2000 Constitution Party presidential nominee
- Joel Skousen, Howard Phillips associate and conspiracy theorist
- Fmr. Sen. Bob Smith (R-NH)
- Joseph Sobran, former National Review columnist
- Richard B. Spencer
- Fmr. Rep. Steve Stockman (R-TX)
- Thomas Woods, author of The Politically Incorrect Guide to American History.

=== Growing media interest ===
The campaign also increased a drive for ballot access, appealing to supporters for help to get on the presidential ballot in Pennsylvania, Massachusetts, Maryland, and West Virginia.

The campaign began in August by announcing its plans to participate in a demonstration against illegal immigration in Denver during the Democratic National Convention. Baldwin was joined by Bob Barr, Alan Keyes and Tom Tancredo at the "Rally Against Illegal Immigration" during the first day of the convention. Later in August, Baldwin campaigned in Spartanburg, South Carolina where he criticized both parties' presidential nominees as "globalists". He declared his opposition to the Federal Reserve, which he stated has "subjugated" the nation to "foreign dependence". He railed against the use of the National Guard in the Iraq War remarking that the forces should be used to "repel" the "invasion" of illegal aliens from the southern border, and described the United Nations as "a sinister organization run by Marxists, socialists and communists." Baldwin criticized both major parties for not cutting spending stating that "the only difference between Democrats and Republicans is Democrats want to tax and spend and Republicans want to borrow and spend." He promised that slashing spending would be a priority in his administration.

On September 10, Baldwin appeared on the Lou Dobbs Tonight television program on CNN where he proclaimed that if elected president he would release U.S. Border agents Jose Compean and Ignacio Ramos. The agents were sentenced to 11 and 12-year terms in prison, respectively, after shooting a drug smuggler on the US-Mexico border. Baldwin promised he would release the men during his first day on the job as president.

=== Final stages ===
Baldwin-Castle ballot access.

In October, Baldwin was interviewed by NPR where he discussed his opposition to the Federal Reserve, which he described as a "fraudulent system" and which he blamed for the 2008 financial crisis. He attacked Republicans for "reneg[ing] on their promises" in 1994's Contract with America to "eliminate five federal departments, such as Department of Education, Energy, Commerce..." and to "slash spending." He also criticized Republicans' failure to criminalize abortion during their years in government. As president Baldwin stated he would eliminate the IRS and cut government spending as well. He stated that the "responsibility of government [is] to protect life, even life in the womb."

Baldwin participated in a third party debate with Independent candidate Ralph Nader on October 23, broadcast on CSPAN-2. During the debate, Baldwin often agreed with Nader on as wide-ranging issues as corporations and the wars in Iraq and Afghanistan. He stood in solidarity with Nader in expressing the need to open the presidential debates to third-party candidates. He emphasized his connections to Congressman Ron Paul throughout the debate, even suggesting that as president he would appoint "somebody like Ron Paul" as United States Secretary of Treasury. He articulated his opposition to the USA PATRIOT Act and questioned how an ideological conservative could support the legislation. But, he marked a disagreement with Nader on health care, criticizing government involvement in favor of free market solutions but with use of regulation to lower health care costs. Baldwin stated that if elected his first priority would be to secure the border. Throughout the debate Baldwin repeated his party's pro-life platform and support for the right to bear arms.

On election day, Baldwin was on ballot in 37 states. He was a write-in candidate in eleven additional states including Montana where Ron Paul was listed as the party's nominee. Baldwin was completely absent from ballots in Oklahoma, North Carolina and the District of Columbia.

=== Results ===
Baldwin's campaign ended after receiving 199,314 or 0.15% of the popular vote on Election Day. He finished in fifth place, but won the largest percentage of votes for his party since Howard Phillips in 1996. 14,865 of his votes were won in Michigan, but he won his largest percentage in Utah with 1.26% of the state's votes.

== Aftermath ==
Baldwin relocated to Montana in 2010, and founded the Liberty Fellowship, believing the people of the state responded well to his constitutionalist message. In 2012, he briefly ran for Lieutenant Governor of Montana as the running mate of Republican gubernatorial primary candidate Bob Fanning, but dropped out due to the lack of campaign funds.

== See also ==
- Comparison of United States presidential candidates, 2008
- List of candidates in the United States presidential election, 2008
- Nationwide opinion polling for the United States presidential election, 2008
- Third party (United States) presidential candidates, 2008
