= Chuck Baldwin =

American politician (born 1952)

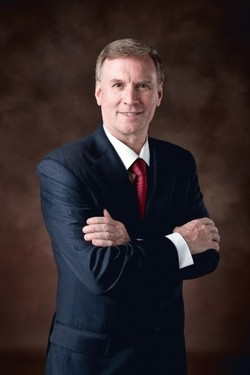
- Baldwin in 2008

Personal details
- Born: Charles Obadiah Baldwin; May 3, 1952 (age 74) La Porte, Indiana, U.S.
- Party: American Independent Party (2015–present)
- Other political affiliations: Republican (1980–2000; 2011–2015); Constitution (2000–2011); Democratic (before 1980)
- Spouse: Connie Kay Cole (m. 1973)
- Children: 3
- Education: Liberty University; Christian Bible College
- Website: Official website

Charles Obadiah Baldwin (born May 3, 1952) is an American right-wing politician, radio host, and as founder he served as pastor of Independent Crossroad Baptist Church in Pensacola, Florida. As of 2024 he is leading pastor of Liberty Fellowship in Kalispell, Montana. He was the presidential nominee of the Constitution Party for the 2008 U.S. presidential election and had previously been its nominee for vice president in 2004. He hosts a daily one-hour radio program, Chuck Baldwin Live, and writes a daily editorial column carried on its website, as well as on VDare. He is a former editor of NewsWithViews.com.

As a Republican Party member, Baldwin was state chairman of the Florida Moral Majority in the 1980s. However, during the 2000 campaign of Republican George W. Bush for U.S. president, Baldwin left the party and began a long period of criticism of Bush. Baldwin endorsed U.S. Representative Ron Paul for the 2008 Republican nomination for president, and Paul in turn endorsed Baldwin for the presidency in the 2008 general election. He identifies as an anti-Zionist, believing that Zionism is the main threat to the U.S. He writes that Zionists control the media, "the mainstream Christian religion, and the U.S. government" and that Zionism is responsible for the ills of U.S. society and culture.

== Family and education ==
Baldwin was born in La Porte, Indiana on May 3, 1952, to Edwin J. "Ed" Baldwin and his second wife, Ruth. Baldwin graduated from La Porte High School in 1971 and attended Midwestern Baptist College in Pontiac, Michigan, for two years. He met Connie Kay Cole there and married her on June 2, 1973. Though he originally had planned on a career in law enforcement, Baldwin felt called to evangelistic ministry; he moved to the South, and enrolled in, and graduated with a Bible diploma from, the Thomas Road Bible Institute (now the Liberty Bible Institute at Liberty University). He additionally received bachelor's and master's degrees in theology through correspondence programs from Christian Bible College of Rocky Mount, North Carolina.

== Ministry ==
On June 22, 1975, Chuck and Connie Baldwin and four other individuals held the first meeting of what would become the Crossroad Baptist Church in Pensacola, Florida; Baldwin was the founding pastor. According to the SPLC, "He preached an anti-abortion, anti-gay, fundamentalist gospel, and the church grew rapidly. It became a Christian evangelical Mecca, complete with a mock graveyard that honored aborted fetuses." By 1985, the church had gone through repeated building programs and been recognized by President Ronald Reagan for its unusual growth and influence.

== Political activity ==
Prior to joining the Republican Party in 1980, Baldwin had been a registered Democrat, like his father. From 1980 to 1984, Baldwin served as Pensacola chairman and then state executive director of the Florida Moral Majority, organized by the Rev. Jerry Falwell. Baldwin helped carry the state twice for Reagan electors; he says he helped Falwell register some 50,000 Christian conservative voters. Baldwin's father, Ed, a lifelong Democrat, expressed grudging admiration for what he saw as Reagan's honesty and courage. In August 1994, Baldwin had a call-in radio show on the Christian Patriot Network.

In 2000, however, Baldwin left the Republican Party on grounds that the Bush–Cheney ticket was too liberal. He saw the two main parties as “two peas in the same pod”. Baldwin has said that many evangelical minds, similarly to ministers in Nazi Germany, had seemingly given George W. Bush "the aura of an American Fuhrer". He considered himself an independent affiliated with the Constitution Party.

At about this time, Baldwin began hosting a local daily one-hour current-events radio program, "Chuck Baldwin Live", which continues today nationwide on the Genesis Communications Network. He wrote a semiweekly editorial column carried on its website, chuckbaldwinlive.com, and in several newspapers. He has also appeared on numerous television shows and radio shows, including on MSNBC and CNN, and in churches across the country. He was the keynote speaker for the 50th anniversary of D-Day at Naval Air Station Pensacola. He also appeared on “The Political Cesspool,” a white nationalist radio program. His columns are archived on VDARE.com, a far right website and he has contributed to the antisemitic American Free Press website.

In 2006, Baldwin said his only organizational memberships were in his church, the Constitution Party, Gun Owners of America, and the National Rifle Association of America.

=== 2004 vice presidential campaign ===
In the 2004 presidential election, Baldwin was the running mate of Michael Peroutka of Maryland and was the candidate for U.S. vice president on the Constitution Party ticket, the Alaskan Independence Party ticket, and other tickets and qualified write-in slots in 42 states. The two ran on a platform of "For God, Family, and the Republic". The Peroutka–Baldwin campaign publicly spoke out against abortion, women in the military, and the Iraq War, and emphasized the Bible, traditional family values, and the need for Constitutionally limited government. According to Political Research Associates, "Peroutka’s 2004 failed presidential campaign was well-known for touting conspiratorial claims".

The party joined with the American Independent Party, the Independent American Party and the Constitution Party to endorse Peroutka–Baldwin as their 2004 presidential ticket.

Peroutka was also endorsed by many paleoconservatives, the Alaskan Independence Party, the League of the South (accepted by Peroutka at its 2004 national convention), the Southern Party of Georgia, Samuel T. Francis, Alex Jones, Howard Phillips, and Taki Theodoracopulos. Pat Buchanan also stated there was a chance he would vote for Peroutka, counting them as "a Buchananite party", but eventually endorsed Bush. The ticket came in fifth with 143,630 votes (0.12%) and spent $728,221, somewhat less per vote than either George W. Bush or John Kerry. It was the only third party to increase its share of the vote in 2004.

=== 2006-2008: Ron Paul and the Black Regiment ===
In the Constitution Party's April 2006 national convention in Tampa, Florida, a heated disaffiliation vote forced members to choose between one of two anti-abortion positions. The assembly voted not to disaffiliate the Independent American Party of Nevada over the more exceptive position of its gubernatorial candidate, Christopher H. Hansen. Baldwin voted in favor of disaffiliation, favoring the more conservative position. Baldwin remained with the party, but several conservative state parties subsequently voted to leave the national party, believing it to have unacceptably compromised the anti-abortion plank of its platform; rump factions have been orchestrated by the national Constitution Party in some of these states.

On August 30, 2007, Baldwin wrote an informal endorsement for Ron Paul for the GOP nomination: "Conservative Republicans have only one choice for president in 2008: Congressman Ron Paul of Texas"; more formal endorsement of Paul came in a December video. That same month, Baldwin said:

Unfortunately, it has been the Christian right's blind support for President Bush in particular and the Republican Party in general that has precipitated a glaring and perhaps fatal defect: the Christian Right cannot, or will not, honestly face the real danger confronting these United States. . . . On the whole, they fail to understand the issues that are critical to our nation's—and their own—survival. . . . Sadly, this is what the Christian Right just doesn't get: ninety percent of the time, it doesn't matter to a tinker's dam whether a Republican or Democrat wins the White House. . . . All the pro-life, pro-family, traditional-values, conservative talk is just that: talk. Republicans use conservative rhetoric the same way Democrats use liberal rhetoric. Neither party believes what they are telling their constituents. They merely say what constituents want to hear in order to get elected; after which, they set about to do what their elitist, globalist manipulators tell them to do.

In April 2007, he launched an appeal for pastors to join the Black Regiment, a network of "spiritual leaders" who support values such as strong borders, resisting abortion and homosexuality, and repudiating George Bush's "unconstitutional" policies. Members decline to register their churches with the IRS for purposes of federal tax exemption.

=== 2008 presidential campaign ===
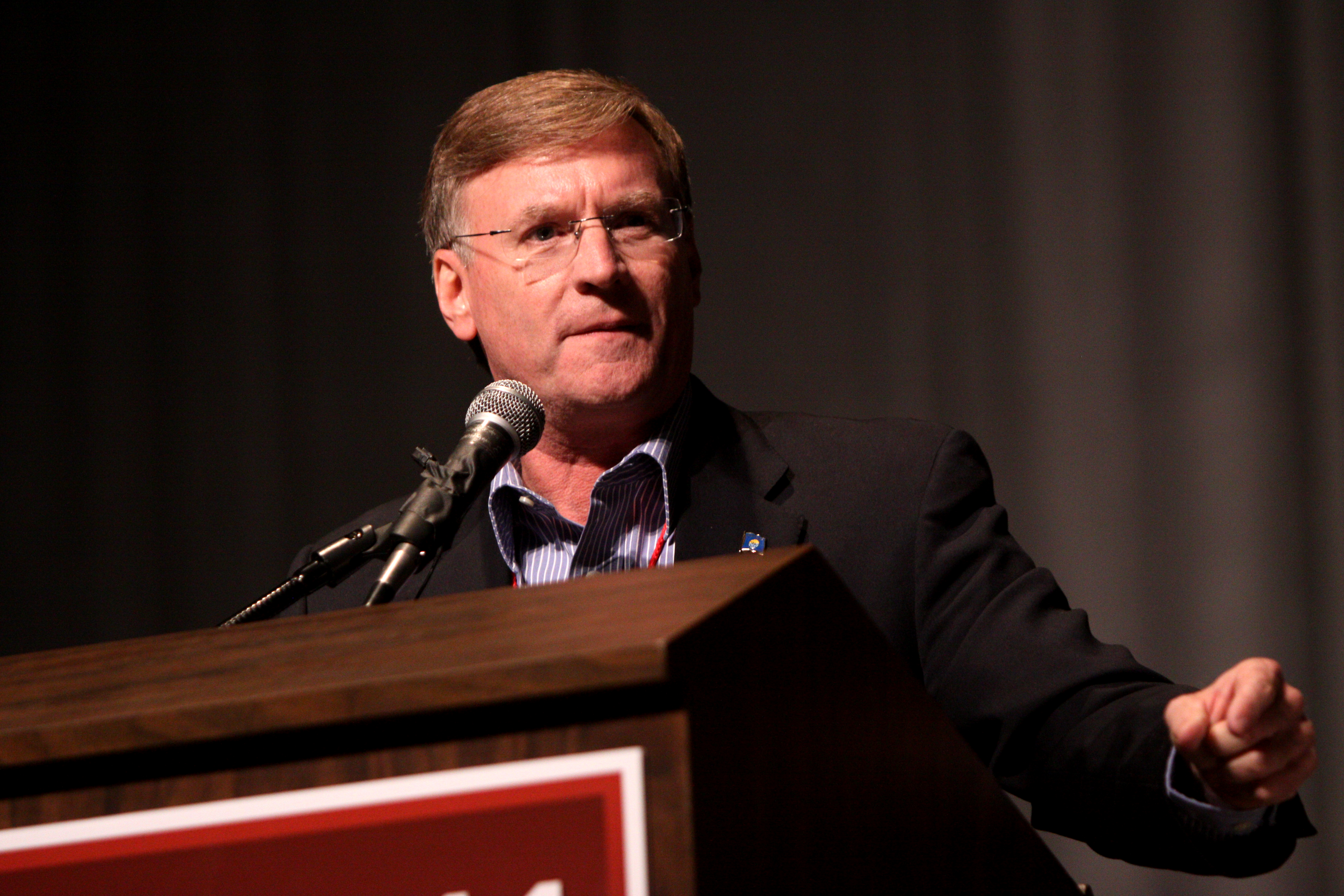
Baldwin speaking at an event in Reno, Nevada.

Baldwin's vice presidential run, and Peroutka's withdrawal from the national Constitution Party, led to active 2006 speculation that Baldwin would seek the presidential nomination in 2008. Baldwin responded in October that "I have learned to never say never, but I have no desire to run. [It] would require several 'miraculous' signs of reassurance that, frankly, I cannot see happening. However, I am always open to God's will." He repeated this stance through March 2008.

Baldwin announced on April 10, two weeks before the national convention was held in Kansas City, Missouri, that he would make himself available for the party's nomination at the convention, while "not 'running,'" but continuing to seek God's will. A Nolan Chart writer conveyed speculation that Baldwin's availability may have been responsive to the sudden candidacy of former ambassador Alan Keyes, who strongly favored the Iraq War. Baldwin, a noninterventionist, admitted others "have urged me to place my name in nomination". In a convention speech, party founder Howard Phillips endorsed Baldwin and controversially referred to Keyes as a neoconservative and a too-recent Republican.

Baldwin was nominated on April 26, 2008, after what was described as the most contentious battle in the party's 16-year history. He received 383.8 votes, ahead of Keyes, who drew 125.7 votes from delegates; Keyes had abandoned the Republicans for the Constitution Party (one month before the Constitution Party convention), much as Baldwin had done in 2000. Party members such as national chairman Jim Clymer said Baldwin's stands were more in line with party thinking. Baldwin asked the convention to nominate bankruptcy attorney Darrell Castle of Tennessee as his running mate, and this request was honored.

After Ron Paul withdrew from the Republican campaign in June, he remained neutral about making a presidential endorsement. On September 10, Paul held a National Press Club conference at which Baldwin, Green Party nominee Cynthia McKinney, and independent candidate Ralph Nader all agreed on four principles—quickly ending the Iraq War, protecting privacy and civil liberties, stopping increases in the national debt, and investigating the Federal Reserve—and on their opposition to the Democratic and Republican parties ignoring these issues. Paul's advice at the conference was to vote for whichever third-party candidate one has the most affinity to, because "we must maximize the total votes of those rejecting the two major candidates." However, on September 22, 2008, Paul stated his neutrality was "due to my respect and friendship and support from both the Constitution and Libertarian Party members ... and I'm a ten-term Republican congressman. It is not against the law to participate in more than one political party." Paul then gave his endorsement to Baldwin: "Unsolicited advice from the Libertarian Party candidate ... has [persuaded] me to reject my neutral stance in the November election. I'm supporting Chuck Baldwin, the Constitution Party candidate." Paul later clarified that though he would vote for Baldwin, he recognized the diversity of his support base and could not bind anyone's conscience. A former Paul primary backer, Houston term limits pioneer Clymer Wright, also contributed to the Baldwin campaign.

Baldwin wrote specifically against the candidacies of Barack Obama and John McCain, and those of vice-presidential nominees Sarah Palin and Joe Biden. In his campaign, he said that the September 11 terrorist attacks might have been an "inside job," attacked Republicans for not eliminating federal departments, called for closing of the Education and Energy departments of the Federal Government and the IRS and Federal Reserve, and called for the U.S. to withdraw from the United Nations, "a sinister organization run by Marxists, socialists and communists".

Baldwin received 199,314 votes, 0.15% of the popular vote, putting him in fifth place, while Paul and Peroutka polled 2% in Montana.

=== Move to Montana: Liberty Fellowship and the American Redoubt ===
In 2010, Baldwin retired from his position as pastor of Crossroad Baptist Church and announced his intention to move with his extended family to Montana, because he believed God had told him that the mountain states were the "tip of the spear in the freedom fight". In March 2011, he wrote an article in support of the American Redoubt strategic relocation movement originated by novelist and blogger James Wesley Rawles. This plan designates five western states (Idaho, Montana, Wyoming, eastern Oregon, and eastern Washington) as a safe haven for conservative Christians. In a June 9, 2011 article, Baldwin outlined his reasons for choosing the Flathead Valley of western Montana for his family's home. He cited Montana's freedom-loving people, its recognition of the right to keep and bear arms, and a feeling of strong conviction, following prayer: "“We know there’s a fight coming. We know there is a line being drawn in the sand, and we want to be in the right place. The good ground is right here in Montana,”

He established a new church in Montana, the Liberty Fellowship, based in the Kalispell area, where congregants have included survivalist Randy Weaver and neo-Nazi activist April Gaede. Gaede described on the Stormfront website how Baldwin's sermons move her to tears. BuzzFeed describes the church as "an anti-government, anti-globalism church... that serves as a beacon for the extreme political right — a mix of constitutionalists, militia members, and separatists".

In 2011, Baldwin spoke at a survivalist expo in the Flathead Valley, hosted by Flathead Liberty Bell, an organization led by former militia leader David Burgert, alongside Stewart Rhodes, the founder of the right-wing Oath Keepers movement.

In December 2019, Rawles listed Baldwin first in a list of "key leaders and promoters of the American Redoubt movement".

=== 2012 campaign for lieutenant governor ===
In November, 2011, Republican Montana gubernatorial candidate Bob Fanning selected Chuck Baldwin as his running mate. Baldwin withdrew his candidacy for lieutenant governor on February 12, 2012, several months before the June primary.

=== 2012 presidential nomination ===
In July 2012, the Reform Party of the United States' Kansas affiliate nominated Baldwin as its presidential candidate, though Andre Barnett was the national candidate. Baldwin received 5,017 votes, or 0.43% of the total popular vote in Kansas.

=== Second Amendment Pastors, Oath Keepers ===
In January 2013, Baldwin launched a network of Second Amendment Pastors, which resists the registration of firearms.

Also in 2013, Baldwin became the national chaplain of the anti-government Oath Keepers group.

In 2014, he gave a sermon at an armed stand-off between anti-government activists led by Cliven Bundy and federal agents at Bundy's ranch in Nevada.

=== The COVID-19 pandemic ===
Although he told congregants that he believed COVID-19 to be real, Baldwin preached that federal and state public health measures against it were a "pretext for civil tyranny", a form of "Medical martial law" and a "psychological ops campaign against the American people".

Baldwin resigned from his Oath Keepers position in April 2020, due to the group's response to the COVID-19 pandemic. The group pledged support for public health measures such as suspending public gatherings, to which Baldwin responded: "By resorting to gross fearmongering and hyperbole, you have joined the mainstream media and Big Government medical hacks in attacking virtually every constitutionally protected liberty upon which our country was founded."

Early in the pandemic, he committed to holding an in-person Easter gathering in defiance of the state governor's prohibition, saying "Am I now going to allow a bunch of misguided physicians and government bureaucrats tell me that I can no longer serve God the way he has called me to serve him? If I were to do so, I would be less than a Christian." His YouTube channel hosted a viral video in April 2020 alleging federal Centers for Disease Control and Prevention to be artificially inflating the recorded number of coronavirus deaths.

Baldwin called Anthony Fauci a "Big Pharma fascist" in 2020.

== Political positions ==
=== Moral issues ===
Baldwin has several beliefs typically distinctive of Independent Baptists. For example, he believes in the primacy of the local New Testament church, considers homosexuality as a "moral perversion", favours strict abstinence from drinking and smoking, and strict diet and exercise. In 2010, he identified as a "premillennial dispensationalist", interpreting the Book of Revelation literally. He believes that America has evolved into "a matriarchal society" and that it is losing the "inner toughness" of masculinity.

=== Islam ===
In 2002 he wrote a booklet, "What Every Christian Should Know About Islam". It says that "The Muslim religion has been a bloody, murderous religion since its inception." Baldwin summarizes Muslim persecution of Christians by saying, "Only communism rivals Islam in sheer numbers of people persecuted and killed". However, more recently, he has argued that Zionism constitutes a greater threat to America than Islamic terrorism, and urged Christians to draw distinctions between different sects of Islam.

=== Foreign policy ===
Baldwin supports American sovereignty and is an opponent of what he sees as the New World Order. He has stated that fighting against one-world government is his top priority. He believes globalism in government has led to many connected threats and issues, among which he lists illegal immigration, the United Nations, the North Atlantic Treaty Organization, the North American Free Trade Agreement, CAFTA, the North American Union, the Trans-Texas Corridor, the Iraq War, China, the Security and Prosperity Partnership, and the Free Trade Area of the Americas. He would also effect United States withdrawal from the United Nations and has pledged to push the UN out of its New York City offices.

Baldwin believed that "the invasion and occupation of Iraq was absolutely unnecessary" and said his presidency would result in troop withdrawal from Iraq.

Baldwin argues that Iran is not an enemy, saying "Our enemy is those warmongering miscreants in Washington, D.C., Tel Aviv, Riyadh and London." And that "when did the terrible 'terrorist' state of Iran shoot down a U.S. passenger jet and murder nearly 300 innocent civilian passengers? You can't remember? Well, you can't remember, because Iran did NOT shoot down an American passenger jet; it was America that shot down an Iranian passenger jet."

He has written that "the Mexican government is deliberately and systematically working to destabilize and undermine the very fabric and framework of American society." He strongly opposes "amnesty" for illegal immigrants and would try to end illegal immigration.

Baldwin has suggested reopening the investigation into the September 11 attacks, believing that the 9/11 truth movement has a right to have "alternative" 9/11 theories investigated, including those that raise the possibility of U.S. government involvement in the attacks.

Baldwin has long been a critic of neoconservatism, and argues that recent wars that America has fought in the middle east are "waged on behalf of the Zionist state" [of Israel]. He is especially critical of attempts at regime change in Iraq, Libya, Syria and Iran, considering American involvement therein to be intended to assist Israel in the creation of a "Greater Israel" that would make "Israel the dominant political and military force in the region". He also opposes Donald Trump, calling him a "Zionist puppet"; he believes that Trump has betrayed his previous campaign promises to keep America out of wars, even going so far as to argue that "Trump is making all of the overtures of taking us into the Third World War" and speaking favorably of General Smedley Butler's anti-war book War is a Racket.

=== Antisemitism and anti-Zionism ===
Baldwin believes that the "castrated churches" of America are terrified of "Judaizers".

Baldwin argues that, "Zionists heavily influence—if not outright control—the mainstream news media, the major motion picture industry, the popular entertainment industry, mainstream Christian religion, and the U.S. government. I'll say it straight out: Zionism is not only a 'clear and present danger' to the liberties of the American people; it is the BIGGEST danger to the liberties of the American people." Baldwin argues that Israel is a fascist apartheid state that "commits mass murder against defenseless Palestinians" and is responsible for the deaths of innocent Palestinians and hundreds of thousands of other Arabs, as well as thousands of Americans. He considers Israel a creation of the Jewish Rothschild dynasty, to which he also ascribes much of the blame for the Russian Revolution. In a similar vein, he believes the Israel Lobby exercises a harmful influence over US politics, and he opposes attempts to criminalize boycotts of Israel, arguing that laws against such boycotts violate Americans' civil rights. He has argued that neoconservatives and "Zionist billionaires" "prop up" former Israeli Prime Minister Benjamin Netanyahu, whom he labels a "warmonger" and "criminal"

Baldwin believes that "Zionism has killed more Americans (not to mention the hundreds of thousands of innocent men, women, and children throughout the Arab world) through our perpetual wars-for-Israel; destroyed the Christian faith of generations of America's youth; destroyed the sanctity of the traditional family; infested America with every kind of moral rot and sexual perversion; and has Judaized the Christian Church in America to the point of turning the fascist Zionist State of Israel into an object of worship."

He also argues that Zionism is a fascist and communist movement, writing: "Anyone who claims to be opposed to globalism and neoconism but denies the pernicious part that Zionism plays in globalism and neoconism is either badly ignorant of what globalism and neoconism really are or is knowingly providing cover for the Zionists—and is, therefore, controlled opposition for Zionists. I believe the latter is true in far, far too many cases. And never forget the fact that at their center Zionists are fascists and communists."

He also blames "Zionist influence" in "America's entertainment industries, economic policies, educational systems, news networks (including and maybe especially FOX News) and America's political and religious institutions" for what he perceives as a decline in "America's family/moral culture, educational culture, economic culture, entertainment culture, political culture, and, yes, Christian culture". He argues that "Christian Zionism" is a "false theology" and is distinct from what he terms "traditional Christianity", which in his view does not recognize the modern state of Israel as a fulfillment of Biblical prophecy. He argues that "Christian Zionists" are influenced by the Scofield Bible, which he considers heretical.

He is highly critical of media personality Ben Shapiro, calling him a "Zionist Christ-rejecting blasphemer", comparing him with the Pharisees, and arguing that Shapiro is not a true conservative.

=== Economy ===
Baldwin says he would end all federal income taxes and phase out the Internal Revenue Service. His website also says that "a tariff on foreign imports, based on the difference between the foreign item's cost of production abroad and the cost of production of a similar item produced in the United States, would be a Constitutional step toward a fair trade policy that would protect American jobs and, at the same time, raise revenue for our national government."

He has said that as president he would streamline the federal government and tap oil reserves in Alaska, the Dakotas, and the Gulf of Mexico. He believes the United States should return to the gold standard.

=== States' rights and characterization of the Civil War ===
NewsOne.com has described Baldwin as a Neo-Confederate. Baldwin believes that "the South was right in the War Between the States" (referring to the American Civil War), and that the leaders of the Confederacy were not racists. He uses the term "War for Southern Independence" and "War of Northern Aggression".

He criticized George W. Bush's failure to rescind executive orders by Bill Clinton that Baldwin argued undermined states' rights and private property rights.

In 2010, he spoke at a Neo-Confederate "Alabama Secession Day Commemoration" linked to the League of the South.

=== Individual liberties ===
Baldwin "believe[s] the federal 'war on terror' and 'war on drugs' are mostly a cover for power-hungry, Big Government zealots to trample constitutional government and squash freedoms and liberties, which are supposed to be protected by the Bill of Rights and Declaration of Independence". He opposes the Patriot Act and related legislation and orders, saying that it "deprives the people of their rights secured under the Fourth and Fifth Amendments under the guise of 'combating terrorism' or 'protecting national security'". In relation to airplane captain Don Carty profiling a customer's credentials and behavior, Baldwin stated that "profiling of all sorts is a very necessary tool for effective law enforcement. Only morons would try to hamper a lawman's ability to bring criminals to justice by removing this tool from them."

Regarding the separation of church and state, Baldwin believes that "America was deliberately and distinctively founded as a haven for Christians" and he supports the public display of the Ten Commandments in government buildings.

He says that freedom of association in health care is important: "I strongly support the freedom of choice of practitioner and treatment for all citizens for their health care. ... The government should not have the power to force people to receive immunizations or vaccinations." He also would eliminate the Food and Drug Administration as unconstitutional.

Baldwin supports freedom for homeschooling and private schooling and wants to disband the U.S. Department of Education; he says that he would be the best friend homeschoolers have ever had in the White House.

Baldwin previously stated

If we were really serious about making airline travel safer, we would immediately cease and desist from this incessant infatuation with meddling into the internal affairs of foreign countries, stop invading and occupying foreign countries, and stop our own State Department and CIA from sticking their noses where they don't belong--which only serves to agitate the world against us. We'd stop giving out travel visas to people from countries sympathetic to terrorists; seal the US border--especially the southern border; and allow pilots, policemen, and any other citizen lawfully qualified to carry a firearm to carry those weapons on board the aircraft.

Baldwin believes that the right to keep and bear arms should not be infringed by the government:

A Baldwin Administration will uphold the right of the citizens to keep and bear arms and will oppose attempts to prohibit ownership of guns by law-abiding citizens, and, further, will stand against all laws which would require the registration of guns or ammunition. . . . Richard Henry Lee, a signer of the Declaration, once said, "To preserve liberty, it is essential that the whole body of the people always possess arms, and be taught alike, especially when young, how to use them." Just as the right to bear arms is necessary in the defense against tyranny, so [too] is that same right vital for the purpose of self-defense. ... Firearms are used 60 times more often to protect the lives of honest citizens than to take lives. ... The vast majority of the time (92%), the mere presence of a firearm helps to avert a major crime from occurring. That is what Congressman Roscoe Bartlett (R-MD) concluded after extensive research. According to Rep. Bartlett, the number of defensive uses is four times the number of crimes reported committed with guns.

According to Political Research Associates, he believes revolution is preferable to gun control.

Baldwin had already begun promoting militia movements on his radio show as early as 1995. He says that in his opinion, people like Morris Dees, head of the Southern Poverty Law Center, try to "pander the market of fear, trying to convince everybody that anyone with a gun, any person who wants to own a gun, and anyone who would consider themselves part of a citizen militia is a threat to our government and to our society". He takes a critical view of the federal government's handling of Randy Weaver, the Branch Davidians, and Hutaree.

Baldwin firmly opposes abortion (which he sees as "murder" and "America's national Holocaust") and Roe v. Wade. He favors Ron Paul's Sanctity of Life Act and says his presidency would end abortion. He opposes female military combat service, saying in 2010 it "does not serve the interests of combat effectiveness. Neither does it serve the interests of family and child rearing." He also opposes mixed service, and homosexual service.

== Recognition ==
Baldwin has received two honorary doctor of divinity degrees, from Christian Bible College and from Trinity Baptist College in Jacksonville, Florida.

== Bibliography ==
- Baldwin, Chuck, ed. (2001). The Freedom Documents. Abigail Adams, John Adams, Samuel Adams, Patrick Henry, Robert E. Lee, Abraham Lincoln, Thomas Paine, Ronald Reagan, Theodore Roosevelt, Mark Twain. Pensacola, Florida: Chuck Baldwin Live Radio Talk Show. OCLC 212793142.
- Let's Look at Legalism.
- Subjects Seldom Spoken On: 11 Messages That Will Stimulate Your Mind and Stir Your Heart, 1990.
- This Is the Life (a verse-by-verse exposition of the Epistles of John).

Party political offices
Preceded by Curtis Frazier	Constitution nominee for Vice President of the United States; 2004	Succeeded by Darrell Castle
Preceded by Michael Peroutka	Constitution nominee for President of the United States; 2008	Succeeded by Virgil Goode
