= Electoral history of Mike Gravel =

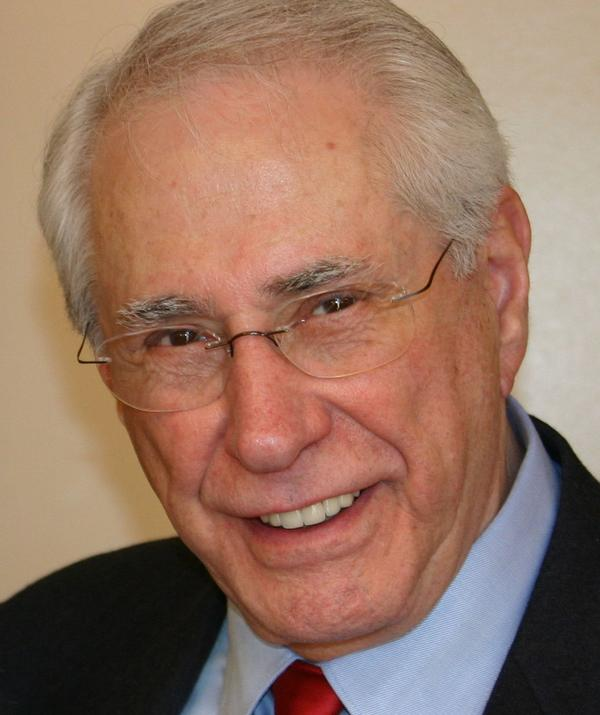
Former Senator Mike Gravel

Electoral history of Mike Gravel, Speaker of the Alaska House of Representatives (1965–1966), United States Senator from Alaska (1969–1981), candidate for the 1972 Democratic Party Vice Presidential nomination and 2008 Democratic and later Libertarian Presidential nomination

Alaska House of Representatives, 8th District, 1962 (Democratic primary):

- Mike Gravel – finished among top 14 of 33 Democrats

Alaska House of Representatives, 8th District, 1962 (general election):

- Mike Gravel – 8,174 (8th overall in contest for 14 seats)

Alaska's at-large congressional district, 1966 (Democratic primary):

- Ralph Julian Rivers (inc.) – 17,042 (52.52%)
- Mike Gravel – 15,404 (47.48%)

Democratic primary for the United States Senate from Alaska, 1968:

- Mike Gravel – 17,971 (52.88%)
- Ernest Gruening (inc.) – 16,015 (47.12%)

Alaska United States Senate election, 1968:

- Mike Gravel (D) – 36,527 (45.13%)
- Elmer E. Rasmuson (R) – 30,286 (37.42%)
- Ernest Gruening (I) (inc.) (write-in) – 14,118 (17.44%)

1972 Democratic National Convention (Vice Presidential tally):

- Thomas Eagleton – 1,742 (59.07%)
- Frances Farenthold – 405 (13.73%)
- Mike Gravel – 226 (7.66%)
- Endicott Peabody – 108 (3.66%)
- Clay Smothers – 74 (2.51%)
- Birch Bayh – 62 (2.10%)
- Peter Rodino – 57 (1.93%)
- Jimmy Carter – 30 (1.02%)
- Shirley Chisholm – 20 (0.68%)
- Moon Landrieu – 19 (0.64%)
- Edward T. Breathitt – 18 (0.61%)
- Ted Kennedy – 15 (0.51%)
- Fred R. Harris – 14 (0.48%)
- Richard G. Hatcher – 11 (0.37%)
- Harold E. Hughes – 10 (0.34%)
- Joseph M. Montoya – 9 (0.31%)
- William L. Guy – 8 (0.27%)
- Adlai Stevenson III – 8 (0.27%)
- Robert Bergland – 5 (0.17%)
- Hodding Carter – 5 (0.17%)
- Cesar Chavez – 5 (0.17%)
- Wilbur Mills – 5 (0.17%)
- Wendell Anderson – 4 (0.14%)
- Stanley Arnold – 4 (0.14%)
- Ron Dellums – 4 (0.14%)
- John J. Houlihan – 4 (0.14%)
- Roberto A. Mondragon – 4 (0.14%)
- Reubin O'Donovan Askew – 3 (0.10%)
- Herman Badillo – 3 (0.10%)
- Eugene McCarthy – 3 (0.10%)
- Claiborne Pell – 3 (0.10%)
- Terry Sanford – 3 (0.10%)
- Ramsey Clark – 2 (0.07%)
- Richard J. Daley – 2 (0.07%)
- John DeCarlo – 2 (0.07%)
- Ernest Gruening – 2 (0.07%)
- Roger Mudd – 2 (0.07%)
- Edmund Muskie – 2 (0.07%)
- Claude Pepper – 2 (0.07%)
- Abraham Ribicoff – 2 (0.07%)
- Pat Taylor – 2 (0.07%)
- Leonard Woodcock – 2 (0.07%)
- Bruno Agnoli – 2 (0.07%)
- Ernest Albright – 1 (0.03%)
- William A. Barrett – 1 (0.03%)
- Daniel Berrigan – 1 (0.03%)
- Phillip Berrigan – 1 (0.03%)
- Julian Bond – 1 (0.03%)
- Hargrove Bowles – 1 (0.03%)
- Archibald Burton – 1 (0.03%)
- Phillip Burton – 1 (0.03%)
- William Chappell – 1 (0.03%)
- Lawton Chiles – 1 (0.03%)
- Frank Church – 1 (0.03%)
- Robert Drinan – 1 (0.03%)
- Nick Galifianakis – 1 (0.03%)
- John Goodrich – 1 (0.03%)
- Michael Griffin – 1 (0.03%)
- Martha Griffiths – 1 (0.03%)
- Charles Hamilton – 1 (0.03%)
- Patricia Harris – 1 (0.03%)
- Jim Hunt – 1 (0.03%)
- Daniel Inouye – 1 (0.03%)
- Henry M. Jackson – 1 (0.03%)
- Robery Kariss – 1 (0.03%)
- Allard K. Lowenstein – 1 (0.03%)
- Mao Zedong – 1 (0.03%)
- Eleanor McGovern – 1 (0.03%)
- Martha Mitchell – 1 (0.03%)
- Ralph Nader – 1 (0.03%)
- George Norcross – 1 (0.03%)
- Jerry Rubin – 1 (0.03%)
- Fred Seaman – 1 (0.03%)
- Joe Smith – 1 (0.03%)
- Benjamin Spock – 1 (0.03%)
- Patrick Tavolacci – 1 (0.03%)
- George Wallace – 1 (0.03%)

Democratic primary for the United States Senate from Alaska, 1974:

- Mike Gravel (inc.) – 22,834 (54.31%)
- Gene Guess – 15,090 (35.89%)
- Dick Greuel – 3,367 (8.01%)
- Donald W. Hobbs – 756 (1.80%)

Alaska United States Senate election, 1974:

- Mike Gravel (D) (inc.) – 54,361 (58.28%)
- Clyde R. Lewis (R) – 38,914 (41.72%)

Democratic primary for the United States Senate from Alaska, 1980:

- Clark Gruening – 39,719 (54.89%)
- Mike Gravel (inc.) – 31,504 (43.53%)
- Michael Beasley – 1,145 (1.58%)

2008 New Hampshire Democratic vice presidential primary:

- Raymond Stebbins – 50,485 (46.93%)
- William Bryk – 22,965 (21.35%)
- John Edwards* – 10,553 (9.81%)
- Barack Obama* 6,402 (5.95%)
- Bill Richardson* (write-in) – 5,525 (5.14%)
- Hillary Clinton* (write-in) – 3,419 (3.18%)
- Joe Biden* – 1,512 (1.41%)
- Al Gore* – 966 (0.90%)
- Dennis Kucinich* – 762 (0.71%)
- Bill Clinton* – 388 (0.36%)
- John McCain* – 293 (0.27%)
- Christopher Dodd* – 224 (0.21%)
- Ron Paul* – 176 (0.16%)
- Jack Barnes, Jr.* – 95 (0.09%)
- Mike Gravel* – 91 (0.09%)
- Joe Lieberman* – 67 (0.06%)
- Mitt Romney* – 66 (0.06%)
- Mike Huckabee* – 63 (0.06%)
- Rudy Giuliani* – 46 (0.04%)
- Darrel Hunter* – 20 (0.02%)

2008 Democratic presidential primaries:

Excluding Florida and Michigan, only primary and caucuses votes:

- Barack Obama^{PN} – 16,706,853
- Hillary Clinton* – 16,239,821
- John Edwards* – 742,010
- Bill Richardson* – 89,054
- Uncommitted – 82,660
- Dennis Kucinich* – 68,482
- Joe Biden* – 64,041
- Mike Gravel* – 27,662
- Christopher Dodd* – 25,300
- Others – 22,556

Including Florida and Michigan:

- Hillary Clinton* – 18,225,175 (48.03%)
- Barack Obama^{PN} – 17,988,182 (47.41%) (name removed from the Michigan ballot)
- John Edwards* – 1,006,275 (2.65%)
- Uncommitted – 299,610 (0.79%)
- Bill Richardson* – 106,073 (0.28%)
- Dennis Kucinich* – 103,994 (0.27%)
- Joe Biden* – 81,641 (0.22%)
- Scattering – 44,348 (0.12%)
- Mike Gravel* – 40,251 (0.11%)
- Christopher Dodd* – 35,281 (0.09%)

(* – dropped out from race)
(PN – presumptive nominee)

2008 Democratic Party presidential primaries (selected):

- New Hampshire primary – 404 (0.14%)
- South Carolina primary – 241 (0.05%)
- Alaska caucuses – failed to achieve threshold
- California primary – 8,184 (0.16%)
- Massachusetts primary – 1,463 (0.12%)
- Utah primary – 166 (0.13%)
- Maryland primary – 804 (0.09%)
- Wisconsin primary – 517 (0.05%)
- Mississippi primary – 591 (0.17%)
- North Carolina primary – 12,448 (0.78%)

2008 Libertarian National Convention (Presidential tally):

First ballot:

- Bob Barr – 153
- Mary Ruwart – 152
- Wayne Allyn Root – 123
- Mike Gravel – 71
- George Phillies – 49
- Steve Kubby – 41
- Michael Jingozian – 23
- Ron Paul – 6
- Christine Smith – 6
- Penn Jillette – 3
- Daniel Imperato – 1
- William Koehler – 1
- None of the above – 2

Second ballot:

- Bob Barr – 188
- Mary Ruwart – 162
- Wayne Allyn Root – 138
- Mike Gravel – 71
- George Phillies – 38
- Steve Kubby – 32
- Ron Paul – 3
- Stephen Colbert – 1
- Jesse Ventura – 1
- None of the above – 1

Third ballot:

- Bob Barr – 186
- Mary Ruwart – 186
- Wayne Allyn Root – 146
- Mike Gravel – 71
- George Phillies – 31
- Ron Paul – 1
- None of the above – 2

Fourth ballot:

- Bob Barr – 202
- Mary Ruwart – 202
- Wayne Allyn Root – 149
- Mike Gravel – 76
- None of the above – 2
