= Electoral history of Ron Paul =

List of elections featuring Ron Paul as a candidate

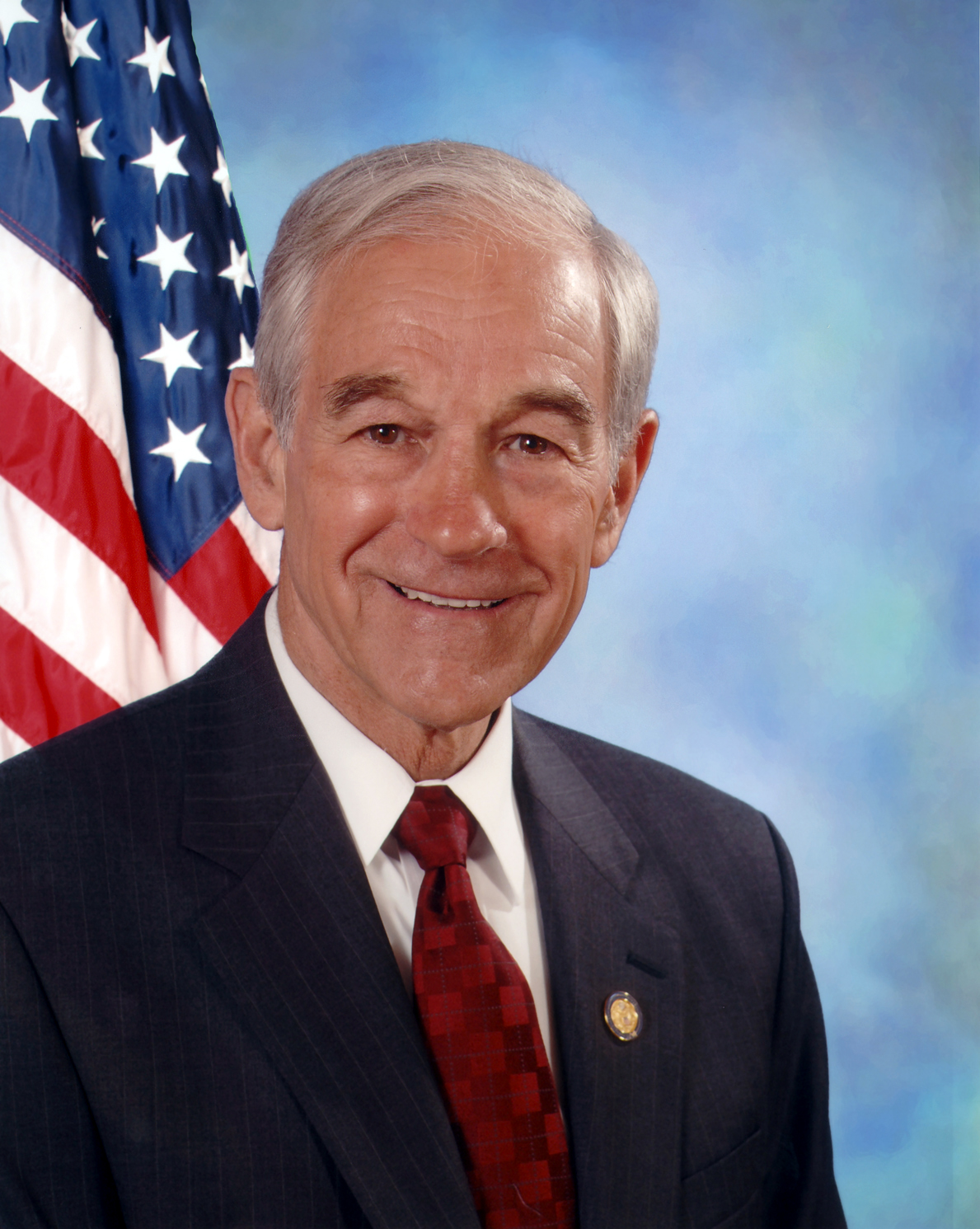
Congressman Ron Paul

Electoral history of Ron Paul, Republican U.S. Representative from Texas (1976-1977, 1979-1985, 1997-2013), 1988 Libertarian Party Presidential nominee and candidate for the 2008 and 2012 Republican presidential nomination.

== House and Senate races (1974-1984) ==
Texas's 22nd congressional district, 1974:

- Robert R. Casey (D) (inc.) – 47,783 (69.54%)
- Ron Paul (R) – 19,483 (28.35%)
- James T. Smith (American) – 847 (1.23%)
- Jill Fein (Socialist Workers) – 602 (0.88%)

Texas's 22nd congressional district, 1976 (special election):

- Robert Gammage (D) – 15,287 (42.07%)
- Ron Paul (R) – 14,386 (39.59%)
- John S. Brunson (D) – 3,670 (10.10%)
- Roy Ybarra (D) – 1,456 (4.01%)
- J. Charles Whitfield (I) – 776 (2.14%)
- Joe W. Jones (I) – 568 (1.56%)
- Erich J. Brann (I) – 197 (0.54%)

Texas's 22nd congressional district, 1976 (special election runoff):

- Ron Paul (R) – 39,041 (56.16%)
- Robert Gammage (D) – 30,483 (43.85%)

Texas's 22nd congressional district, 1976:

- Robert Gammage (D) – 96,535 (50.07%)
- Ron Paul (R) (inc.) – 96,267 (49.93%)

Texas's 22nd congressional district, 1978:

- Ron Paul (R) – 54,643 (50.56%)
- Robert Gammage (D) (inc.) – 53,443 (49.45%)

Texas's 22nd congressional district, 1980:

- Ron Paul (R) (inc.) – 106,797 (51.04%)
- Michael A. Andrews (D) – 101,094 (48.31%)
- Vaudie V. Nance (I) – 1,360 (0.65%)

Texas's 22nd congressional district, 1982:

- Ron Paul (R) (inc.) – 66,536 (100.00%)

Republican primary for the United States Senate from Texas, 1984:

- Phil Gramm – 246,716 (73.25%)
- Ron Paul – 55,431 (16.46%)
- Robert Mosbacher, Jr. – 26,279 (7.80%)
- Hank Grover – 8,388 (2.49%)

== 1988 presidential election ==
1987 Libertarian National Convention:

- Ron Paul – 196 (51.31%)
- Russell Means – 120 (31.41%)
- James A. Lewis – 49 (12.83%)
- None – 17 (4.45%)

1988 North Dakota Libertarian presidential primary:

- Ron Paul – 985 (100.00%)

1988 United States presidential election:

- George H. W. Bush/Dan Quayle (R) – 48,886,597 (53.4%) and 426 electoral votes (79.18%, 40 states carried)
- Michael Dukakis/Lloyd Bentsen (D) – 41,809,476 (45.6%) and 111 electoral votes (20.63%, 10 states and D.C. carried)
- Lloyd Bentsen/Michael Dukakis (D) – 1 electoral vote (0.19%, West Virginia faithless elector)
- Ron Paul/Andre Marrou (LBT) – 431,750 (0.5%)
- Lenora Fulani (New Alliance) – 217,221 (0.2%)
- Others – 249,642 (0.3%)

== House races (from 1996) ==
Texas's 14th congressional district, 1996 (Republican primary):

- Greg Laughlin (inc.) – 14,777 (42.52%)
- Ron Paul – 11,112 (31.97%)
- Jim Deats – 8,466 (24.36%)
- Ted Bozarth – 398 (1.15%)

Texas's 14th congressional district, 1996 (Republican primary runoff):

- Ron Paul – 11,244 (54.06%)
- Greg Laughlin (inc.) – 9,555 (45.94%)

Texas's 14th congressional district, 1996:

- Ron Paul (R) – 99,961 (51.08%)
- Charles Morris (D) – 93,200 (47.62%)
- Ed Fasanella (Natural Law) – 2,538 (1.30%)

Texas's 14th congressional district, 1998:

- Ron Paul (R) (inc.) – 84,459 (55.25%)
- Loy Sneary (D) – 68,014 (44.49%)
- Write-in – 390 (0.26%)

Texas's 14th congressional district, 2000:

- Ron Paul (R) (inc.) – 137,370 (59.71%)
- Loy Sneary (D) – 92,689 (40.29%)

Texas's 14th congressional district, 2002:

- Ron Paul (R) (inc.) – 102,905 (68.09%)
- Corby Windham (D) – 48,224 (31.91%)

Texas's 14th congressional district, 2004:

- Ron Paul (R) (inc.) – 173,668 (100.00%)

Texas's 14th congressional district, 2006 (Republican primary):

- Ron Paul (inc.) – 24,075 (77.65%)
- Cynthia Sinatra – 6,931 (22.35%)

Texas's 14th congressional district, 2006:

- Ron Paul (R) (inc.) – 94,380 (60.19%)
- Shane Sklar (D) – 62,429 (39.81%)

Texas's 14th congressional district, 2008 (Republican primary):

- Ron Paul (inc.) – 37,777 (70.43%)
- Chris Peden – 15,859 (29.56%)

Texas's 14th congressional district, 2008:

- Ron Paul (R) (inc.) – 191,293 (100.00%)

Texas's 14th congressional district, 2010

- Ron Paul (inc.) – 140,441 (76.0%)
- Robert Pruett – 44,345 (24.0%)

== 2008 presidential election ==
Iowa Republican straw poll, 2008:

- Mitt Romney – 4,516 (31.58%)
- Mike Huckabee – 2,587 (18.09%)
- Sam Brownback – 2,192 (15.33%)
- Tom Tancredo – 1,961 (13.71%)
- Ron Paul – 1,305 (9.13%)
- Tommy Thompson – 1,039 (7.27%)
- Fred Thompson – 203 (1.42%)
- Rudy Giuliani – 183 (1.28%)
- Duncan Hunter – 174 (1.22%)
- John McCain – 101 (0.71%)
- John Cox – 41 (0.29%)

Republican New Hampshire Vice Presidential primary, 2008:

- John Barnes, Jr. – 40,207 (62.43%)
- John McCain* – 4,305 (6.68%)
- Mike Huckabee* – 3,227 (5.01%)
- Rudy Giuliani* – 3,164 (4.91%)
- Mitt Romney* – 2,396 (3.72%)
- Ron Paul* – 1,938 (3.01%)
- Fred Thompson* – 1,496 (2.32%)
- Duncan Hunter* – 901 (1.40%)
- Others – 3,982 (6.18%)

(* – write in)

Liberty Union Party presidential primary, 2008:

- Brian Moore – 178 (44.61%)
- Barack Obama – 25 (6.27%)
- Hillary Clinton – 15 (3.76%)
- Ralph Nader – 5 (1.25%)
- Eugene V. Debs – 1 (0.25%)
- Patrick Leahy – 1 (0.25%)
- John McCain – 1 (0.25%)
- Richard Norford – 1 (0.25%)
- Ron Paul – 1 (0.25%)
- Morgan Phillips – 1 (0.25%)
- Others – 170 (42.61%)

Constitution Party presidential primaries, 2008:

- Don J. Grundmann – 16,105 (36.07%)
- Max Riekse – 13,597 (30.45%)
- Ron Paul – 65 (0.15%)
- David Andrew Larson – 18 (0.04%)
- Bryan Malatesta – 18 (0.04%)
- Undecided – 7 (0.02%)
- Mike Huckabee – 3 (0.01%)
- Alan Keyes – 3 (0.01%)
- Mitt Romney – 2 (0.00%)
- Jerome Corsi – 1 (0.00%)
- Others – 1 (0.00%)

Minnesota Independence Party presidential caucus, 2008:

- Mike Bloomberg – 50 (50.00%)
- Barack Obama – 20 (20.00%)
- Ron Paul – 20 (20.00%)
- Others – 10 (10.00%)

2008 Libertarian National Convention (Presidential tally):

First ballot:

- Bob Barr – 153
- Mary Ruwart – 152
- Wayne Allyn Root – 123
- Mike Gravel – 71
- George Phillies – 49
- Steve Kubby – 41
- Michael Jingozian – 23
- Ron Paul – 6
- Christine Smith – 6
- Penn Jillette – 3
- Daniel Imperato – 1
- William Koehler – 1
- None of the above – 2

Second ballot:

- 'Bob Barr – 188
- Mary Ruwart – 162
- Wayne Allyn Root – 138
- Mike Gravel – 71
- George Phillies – 38
- Steve Kubby – 32
- Ron Paul – 3
- Stephen Colbert – 1
- Jesse Ventura – 1
- None of the above – 1

Third ballot:

- Bob Barr – 186
- Mary Ruwart – 186
- Wayne Allyn Root – 146
- Mike Gravel – 71
- George Phillies – 31
- Ron Paul – 1
- None of the above – 2

Sixth ballot:

- Bob Barr – 324
- Mary Ruwart – 276
- Ralph Nader – 1
- Ron Paul – 1
- None of the above – 26

Republican presidential primaries, 2008:

- John McCain – 9,926,234 (46.80%)
- Mitt Romney – 4,663,847 (21.99%)
- Mike Huckabee – 4,280,723 (20.18%)
- Ron Paul – 1,210,022 (5.71%)
- Rudy Giuliani – 597,494 (2.82%)
- Fred Thompson – 294,607 (1.39%)
- Uncommitted – 70,866 (0.33%)
- Alan Keyes – 59,637 (0.28%)
- Scattering – 42,822 (0.20%)
- Duncan Hunter – 39,895 (0.19%)
- Tom Tancredo – 8,595 (0.04%)
- John Cox – 3,351 (0.02%)
- Sam Brownback – 2,838 (0.01%)

2008 Republican National Convention (Presidential tally):

- John McCain – 2,343 (99.28%)
- Ron Paul – 15 (0.64%)
- Mitt Romney – 2 (0.09%)

2008 United States presidential election:

- Barack Obama/Joe Biden (D) – 69,498,215 (52.91%) and 365 electoral votes (28 states+D.C.+NE-02 carried)
- John McCain/Sarah Palin (R) – 59,948,240 (45.66%) and 173 electoral votes (22 states carried)
- Ralph Nader/Matt Gonzales (I) – 738,475 (0.56%)
- Bob Barr/Wayne Allyn Root (LBT) – 523,686 (0.40%)
- Chuck Baldwin/Darrell Castle (CST) – 199,314 (0.15%)
- Cynthia McKinney/Rosa Clemente (Green) – 161,603 (0.12%)
- Alan Keyes/Brian Rohrbough – 47,694 (0.04%)
- Ron Paul/With Multiple VP candidates – 42,426 (0.03%)
- Gloria La Riva/Eugene Puryear (Socialism & Liberation) – 6,808 (0.01%)
- Brian Moore/Stewart Alexander (Socialist) – 6,528 (0.01%)

== 2012 presidential election ==
Iowa Republican straw poll, 2011:

- Michele Bachmann - 4,823 (28.6%)
- Ron Paul - 4,671 (27.7%)
- Tim Pawlenty - 2,293 (13.6%)
- Rick Santorum - 1,657 (9.8%)
- Herman Cain - 1,456 (8.6%)
- Rick Perry (write-in) - 718 (4.3%)
- Mitt Romney - 567 (3.4%)
- Newt Gingrich - 385 (2.3%)
- Jon Huntsman - 69 (0.4%)
- Thaddeus McCotter - 35 (0.2%)
- Scattering - 218 (1.30%)

Republican New Hampshire Vice Presidential primary, 2012:

- Mitt Romney - 97,591 (39.27%)
- Ron Paul - 56,872 (22.88%)
- Jon Huntsman, Jr. - 41,964 (16.88%)
- Rick Santorum - 23,432 (9.43%)
- Newt Gingrich - 23,421 (9.42%)
- Rick Perry - 1,764 (.71%)
- Others - 3,171 (1.27%)
- Misc. write-ins - 260 (0.1%)

2012 Libertarian National Convention (Presidential tally):

- Gary Johnson - 419 (70.42%)
- R. Lee Wrights - 152 (25.55%)
- Jim Burns - 12 (2.02%)
- Carl Person - 3 (0.50%)
- NOTA - 3 (0.50%)
- Sam Sloan (Write-in) - 2 (0.34%)
- Max Abramson (Write-in) - 2 (0.34%)
- Ron Paul (Write-in) - 1 (0.17%)
- Wayne Allyn Root (Write-in) - 1 (0.17%)

Republican presidential primaries, 2012:

- Mitt Romney - 10,031,336 (52.13%)
- Rick Santorum - 3,932,069 (20.43%)
- Newt Gingrich - 2,734,571 (14.21%)
- Ron Paul - 2,095,762 (10.89%)
- Rick Perry - 54,769 (0.28%)
- Jon Huntsman, Jr. - 83,918 (0.44%)
- Michele Bachmann - 41,199 (0.21%)

2012 Republican National Convention (Presidential tally):

- Mitt Romney – 2,061 (90.16%)
- Ron Paul – 185 (8.09%)
- Rick Santorum – 9 (0.39%)
- Jon Huntsman, Jr. - 1 (0.04%)
- Michele Bachmann - 1 (0.04%)
- Buddy Roemer - 1 (0.04%)
- Uncommitted - 1 (0.04%)

2012 United States presidential election:

- Barack Obama/Joe Biden (D) - 65,915,796 (51.06%)
- Mitt Romney/Paul Ryan (R) - 60,933,500 (47.20%)
- Gary Johnson/James P. Gray (Libertarian) - 1,275,971 (0.99%)
- Jill Stein/Cheri Honkala (Green) - 469,627 (0.36%)
- Virgil Goode/Jim Clymer (Constitution) - 122,388 (0.09%)
- Roseanne Barr/Cindy Sheehan (Peace and Freedom) - 67,326 (0.05%)
- Rocky Anderson/Luis J. Rodriguez (Justice) - 43,018 (0.03%)
- Tom Hoefling/Jonathan D. Ellis (America's Party) - 40,628 (0.03%)
- Ron Paul - 26,204 (0.02%)
- Others - 190,944 (0.15%)

== 2016 Presidential Election ==
- Though not a candidate in the 2016 United States presidential election, Ron Paul received one vote in the electoral college. Paul also received a vote on the first ballot at the Libertarian Party National Convention's nomination for President.

== See also ==
- Electoral history of Rand Paul
- Ron Paul presidential campaign, 1988
- Ron Paul presidential campaign, 2008
- Ron Paul presidential campaign, 2012
