= Bob Barr 2008 presidential campaign =

American presidential campaign

Bob Barr 2008
- Campaign: U.S. presidential election, 2008
- Candidate: Bob Barr; United States House of Representative from Georgia (1995–2003) Wayne Allyn Root (Running mate)
- Affiliation: Libertarian Party
- Status: Defeated on Election Day (November 4, 2008)
- Headquarters: Atlanta, Georgia
- Key people: Russ Verney (Campaign Manager)
- Receipts: US$1,405,899 ((2008-12-31))
- Slogan: Liberty for America

Website
- Bob Barr 2008

The 2008 presidential campaign of Bob Barr, former Congressman of Georgia began on May 12, 2008. He announced his candidacy for the Libertarian Party's president after months of grassroots draft efforts. Barr (who had formerly been a Republican) was criticized by Libertarians who opposed his efforts in Congress, which included sponsorship of the Defense of Marriage Act and votes in favor of the USA PATRIOT Act and authorization of the War in Iraq, but he was supported by others who accepted his regret for those positions. Barr won the party's nomination after six rounds of balloting at the 2008 Libertarian Party National Convention. Former contender Wayne Allyn Root was named as his running mate. Reason magazine senior editor Radley Balko called Barr "the first serious candidate the LP has run since I've been eligible to vote."

In the general election, Barr hoped to portray himself as a conservative alternative to the Republican nominee John McCain. He emphasized his opposition to the Republican Party for its positions on the War in Iraq and the USA PATRIOT Act and stood as an advocate of fiscal constraint, demonstrated by his opposition to the Emergency Economic Stabilization Act of 2008. The candidate never made headway in election polls, placing third or fourth when included. Barr's efforts to be invited to presidential debates with the two main candidates also fell short when he failed to meet the 15% polling threshold.

Barr campaigned throughout the nation. He litigated to gain ballot access in several states and to prevent McCain and the Democratic presidential nominee Barack Obama from appearing on the Texas ballot for failing to meet the filing deadline. On election day, Barr appeared on the ballot in 44 states; he finished fourth in the general election, behind Ralph Nader, receiving 523,686 votes, or 0.4% of the total, 126,448 more votes than the Badnarik/Campagna ticket four years prior.

== Background ==
Bob Barr was first elected to the House of Representatives in 1994 as part of the Republican Revolution. While in office, he was a strong proponent of the war on drugs, called for further investigations into the Waco Siege, and authored the Defense of Marriage Act. In 1998, he was a central figure in the Lewinsky scandal investigation, being the first congressman to call for President Bill Clinton's resignation after the allegations surfaced. Near the end of his time in Congress, Barr voted in favor of the USA PATRIOT Act and the authorization for use of force against Iraq. After his congressional district was redrawn in 2002, making reelection more difficult, Barr was ousted from the House. After leaving Congress, Barr became critical of the Bush administration, specifically for the administration's use of the USA PATRIOT Act, which Barr now believed to be unconstitutional. He also worked as a privacy consultant for the American Civil Liberties Union. In 2004, he left the Republican Party and endorsed Libertarian Party nominee Michael Badnarik for president, formally joining the party in 2006.

== Early stages ==
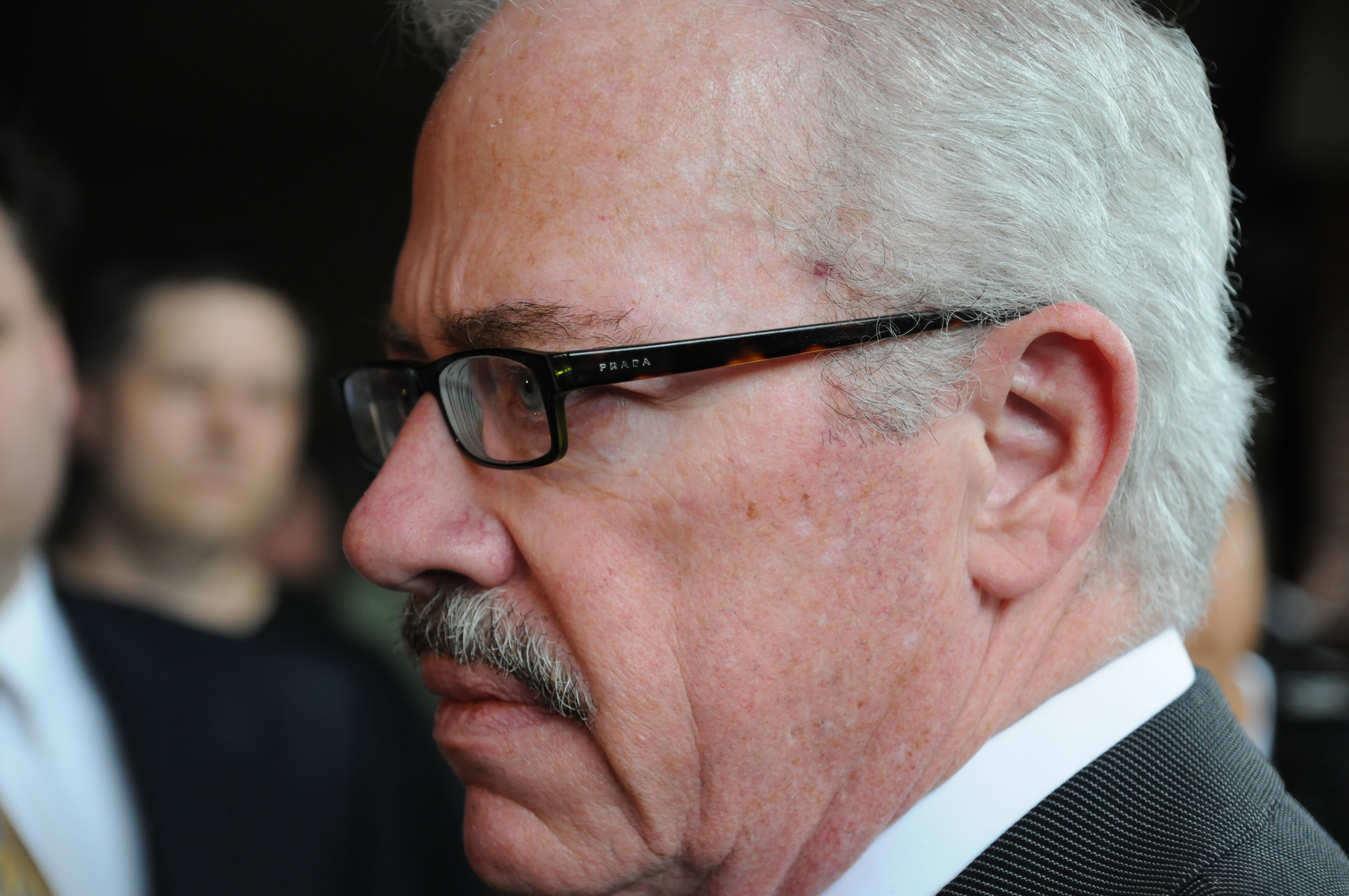
Closeup of Barr

On March 19, 2008, Barr confirmed his interest in running for president. This coincided with the media acknowledging a movement on Facebook encouraging the former Congressman to begin a campaign. Barr talked about a widespread "dissatisfaction with the candidates for the two major parties" but complimented presidential candidate and Republican Congressman Ron Paul for "advocat[ing] libertarian and true conservative principles". Pollster John Zogby commented that a possible Barr candidacy would be potentially upsetting for Republicans, and described his possible supporters as individuals who saw him "as a consistent libertarian who opposed the PATRIOT Act, budget deficits and gun control." Later in the month, Barr stated that he was "looking very seriously at" a presidential run.

Barr launched an exploratory committee and created a campaign website on April 5, 2008. Within two days, the committee reported that $25,000 had been contributed. Russ Verney, who had served as an adviser to Ross Perot in the 1992 and 1996 presidential elections, joined the campaign as a volunteer adviser and worked with Barr's consulting firm, Liberty Strategies LLC, to form a campaign team and build an organization. Verney became the campaign manager after Barr officially announced his candidacy. A poll in late April by Barr's exploratory committee showed that Barr had the support of 7% of the electorate before he had officially declared his candidacy. Leading up to Barr's announcement, columnist George Will wrote an article in Newsweek chronicling the Libertarian Party and the potential candidate's run. Will stated that Barr could have an effect on the election similar to Ralph Nader's in 2000. He described the potential effect as a "condign punishment" for presumptive Republican Party nominee John McCain for his co-sponsorship of the Bipartisan Campaign Reform Act of 2002, which Barr opposed.

== Campaign developments ==
=== Libertarian Party nomination campaign ===
Barr publicly announced his candidacy on May 12, 2008. He commented that his run would give the American people a "meaningful choice" to vote for in November, preventing them from having to "hold their nose and pull a lever... for the lesser of two evils." During his speech, Barr cited out of control government growth as the primary reason for his run. In response to the announcement, Republican consultant Christopher Barron countered the claim of George Will on the campaign's potential "spoiler effect." Baron stated that Barr's run "is unlikely to hurt Sen. McCain in any significant way" but would aide the Republican Party "by siphoning off some of the enthusiasm among college voters and antiwar advocates for Obama."

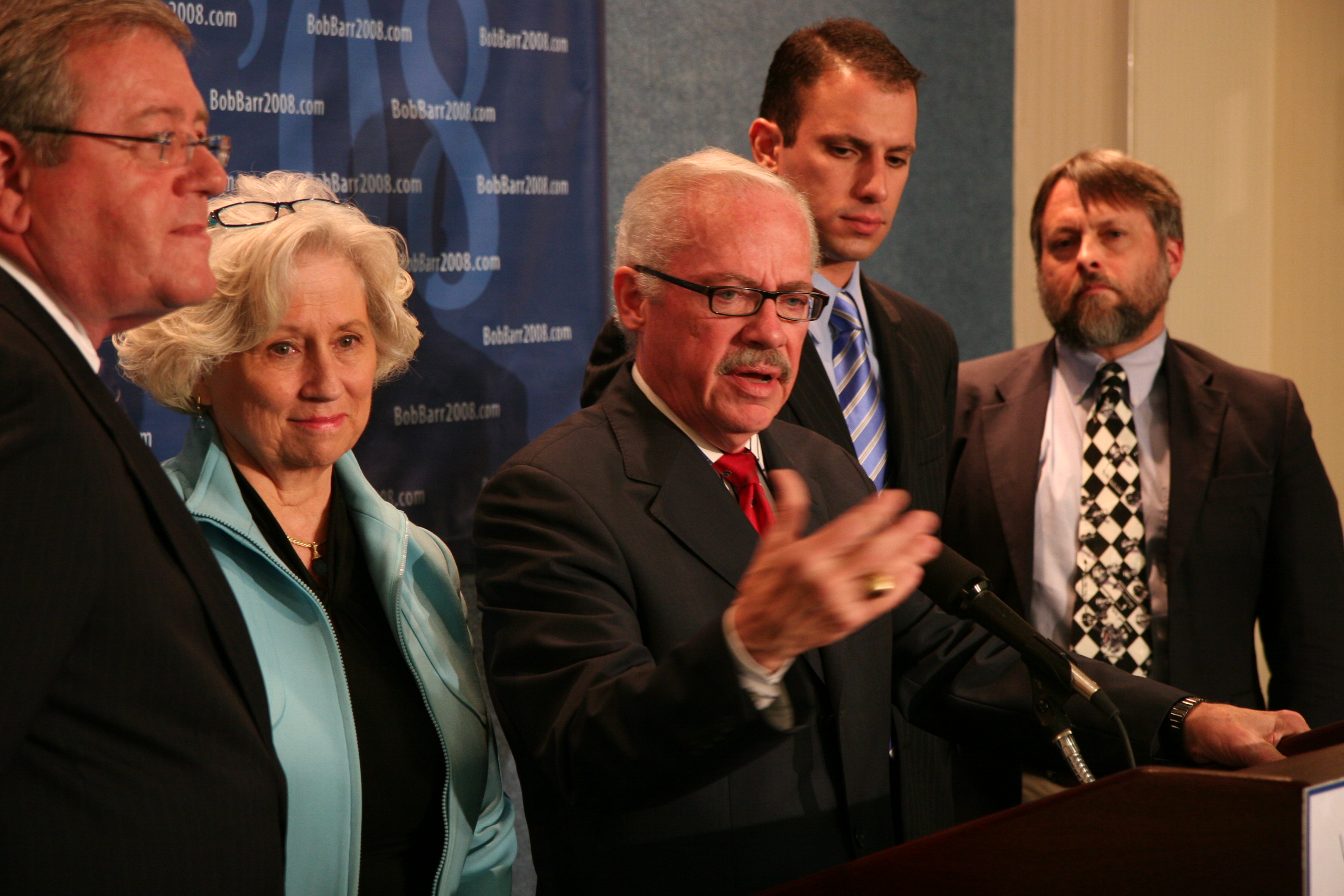
Bob Barr announces his candidacy for president

During an interview with Newsweek following his entrance into the race, Barr was asked why he had announced his candidacy only two weeks before the Libertarian Party convention. He remarked that he had not "seriously consider[ed] [running] until about five or six weeks" prior to his official announcement. When asked about the "spoiler effect", he stated that "the votes [Barr would receive] are not going to come from people that are committed to voting for McCain." Also during the interview, Barr articulated that his campaign would make use of the internet with methods similar to those employed by Ron Paul and Barack Obama to mobilize young voters. Barr attempted to tap into Ron Paul's resources and supporters to raise funds, and used the same company that Paul used, Terra Eclipse, to design his campaign website. Stephen P. Gordon, who worked for Paul, was hired as the e-Campaign manager, and Doug Bandow, who previously worked as an advisor for both Ron Paul and Ronald Reagan, was hired as the Senior Policy Advisor.

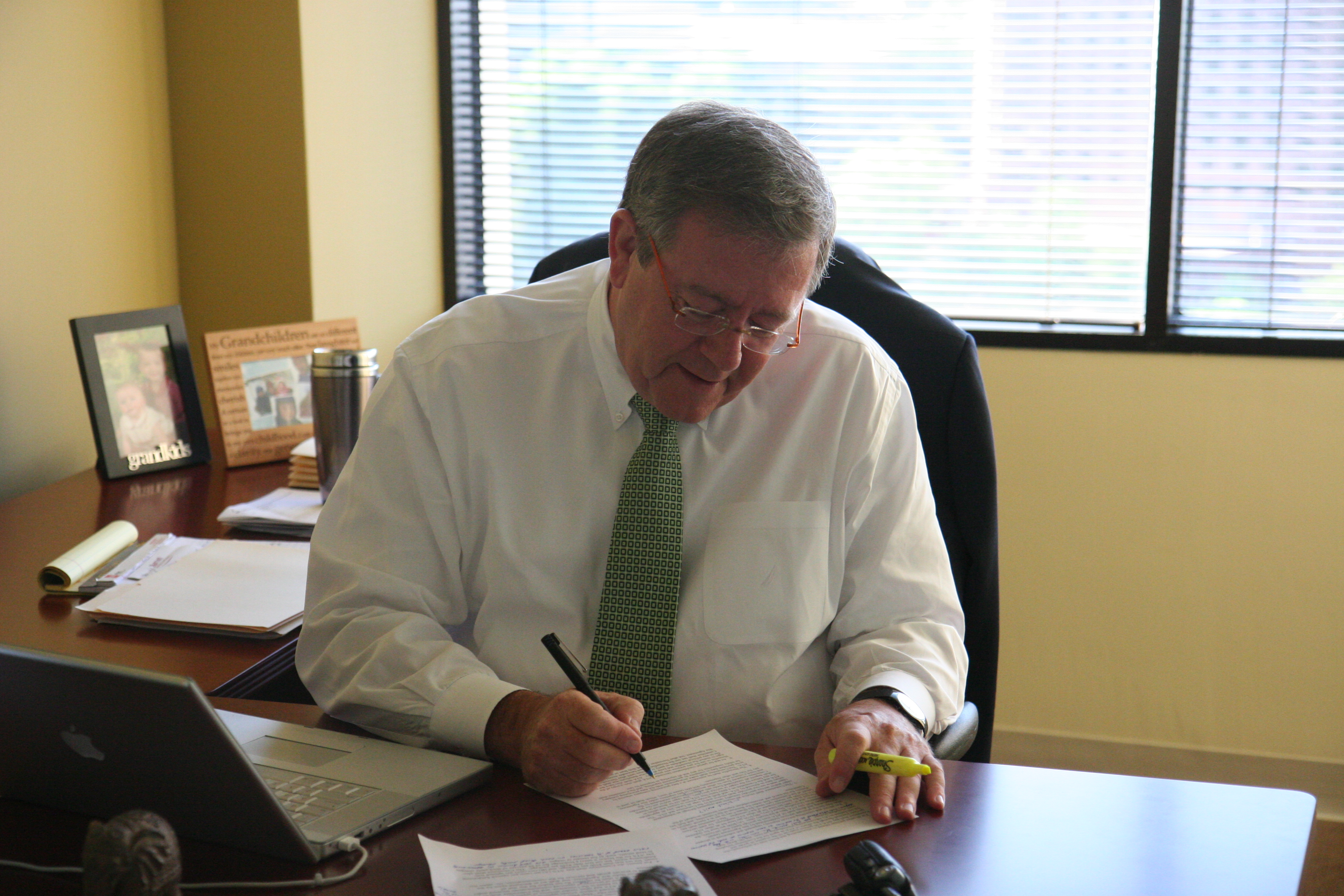
Bob Barr campaign manager Russ Verney

Barr's campaign manager Russ Verney sent a fundraising memorandum on May 19 that included his projections for the campaign, and compared Barr favorably to Ross Perot. His predictions included participation in the nationally televised debates in October 2008 and a popular vote total of 19%. The manager commented that this was "no ordinary presidential campaign" and that Barr would do well because "America is swamped in Libertarian information." May 18, 2008 Rasmussen polling reports showed Barr at 6% nationally in a four-way race with Barack Obama, John McCain, Ralph Nader. He led Nader by 2%. A breakdown of Barr's support showed that 7% of Republicans, 5% of Democrats and 5% of unaffiliated voters supported his campaign. The report concluded that most Americans did not have enough information about Barr to form an opinion. May 20 polls from the Insider Advantage-Majority Opinion Survey of 652 individuals showed that in his home state of Georgia, Barr would receive 8% of the popular vote, placing him in third place, and 27% behind Barack Obama for second.

Barr participated in the Libertarian Party presidential debate, an event sponsored by Reason Magazine, on May 20, 2008, at Dupont Circle. Fellow contenders Mike Gravel and Wayne Allyn Root each appeared at the event. During the discussion, Barr remarked that "inside the heart of every American beats the heart of a libertarian", and said that the nation was on the verge of entering a "Libertarian era." He also stated that as president he would eliminate the Department of Education, a mainstay of the party platform. Later in the debate, Barr's opponent, Root, criticized the Washington media for its portrayal of Barr as the "only candidate", an action he described as "absurd".

=== Libertarian Party presidential nomination ===
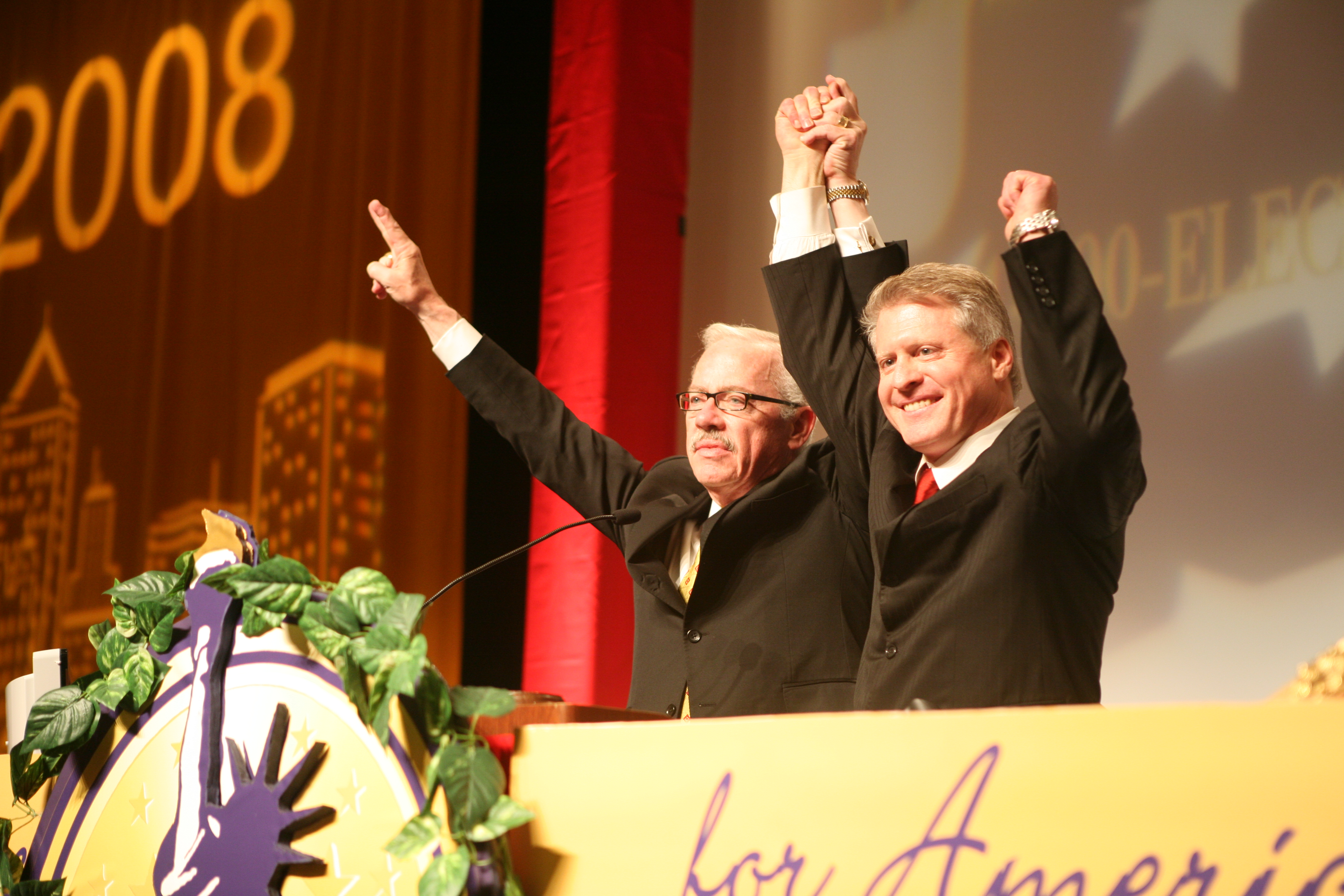
Bob Barr wins the Libertarian Party nomination with running mate Wayne Allyn Root

As the 2008 Libertarian National Convention in Denver approached, members of the Libertarian Party's Radical Caucus criticized Barr by distributing fliers that declared: the "Libertarian Party [is] not for sale." The criticism was in response to allegations that Barr's campaign was an attempt by conservatives to take over the party. Libertarian delegates disagreed with the media's portrayal of the race and said that Barr was "not a shoo-in" for the nomination. At the convention, Barr was attacked by fellow candidates Steve Kubby and Mary Ruwart for his PATRIOT Act vote in 2001. Barr responded, by saying that he regretted the vote and had spent the previous five years "working [to]...drive a stake through [the PATRIOT ACT's] heart, burn it, shoot it, [and] burn it again..." Barr was named the Libertarian Party's nominee after six rounds of balloting on May 25, 2008. Las Vegas businessman, and fellow Libertarian primary opponent Wayne Allyn Root, was named as his running mate.

== General election campaign ==
As the nominee of the Libertarian Party, Barr promised to "travel the width and breadth of this great land" to vie for the presidency. Executive Vice President of the Cato Institute David Boaz commented that Barr had the best chance to be successful in the western states. Russ Verney confirmed that certain states would be targeted, and that a strategy would be drawn that would enable the campaign to raise $30 million. On May 28, the Atlanta Journal-Constitution reported that Barr had raised $163,000 in cash donations. Barr invited the Republican and Democratic Parties' presumptive presidential nominees, John McCain and Barack Obama respectively, to participate in weekly presidential debates. To participate in official presidential debates the Barr campaign had to surpass the 15% threshold put in place by the Commission on Presidential Debates. CNN polling on June 7 placed Barr at 2% nationally.

=== Campaign exposure ===
Barr received some media exposure a few days after his nomination by visiting New York City to appear on both the Colbert Report and on Glenn Beck's Headline News program for an hour-long interview. The former appearance was part of the campaign's strategy to inform young voters and former Ron Paul supporters about the campaign. During the interview with Colbert, Barr was asked why he "voted for the PATRIOT Act" if he was such a "big advocate of personal privacy." He responded by saying that the Bush Administration "went back on everything they told us [in Congress] they would do with the PATRIOT Act." In early June, the campaign dealt with the issue of racism when a white supremacist group posted a Barr endorsement on Stormfront, urging whites to vote for the "best man" rather than the "liberal" John McCain. The Barr campaign repudiated this endorsement. Campaign manager Russ Verney stated, "We do not want and will not accept the support of haters. Tell the haters I said don't let the door hit you in the backside on the way out." He emphasized that "anyone with love in their heart for our country and for every resident of our country regardless of race, religion, nationality, or sexual orientation is welcome with open arms."

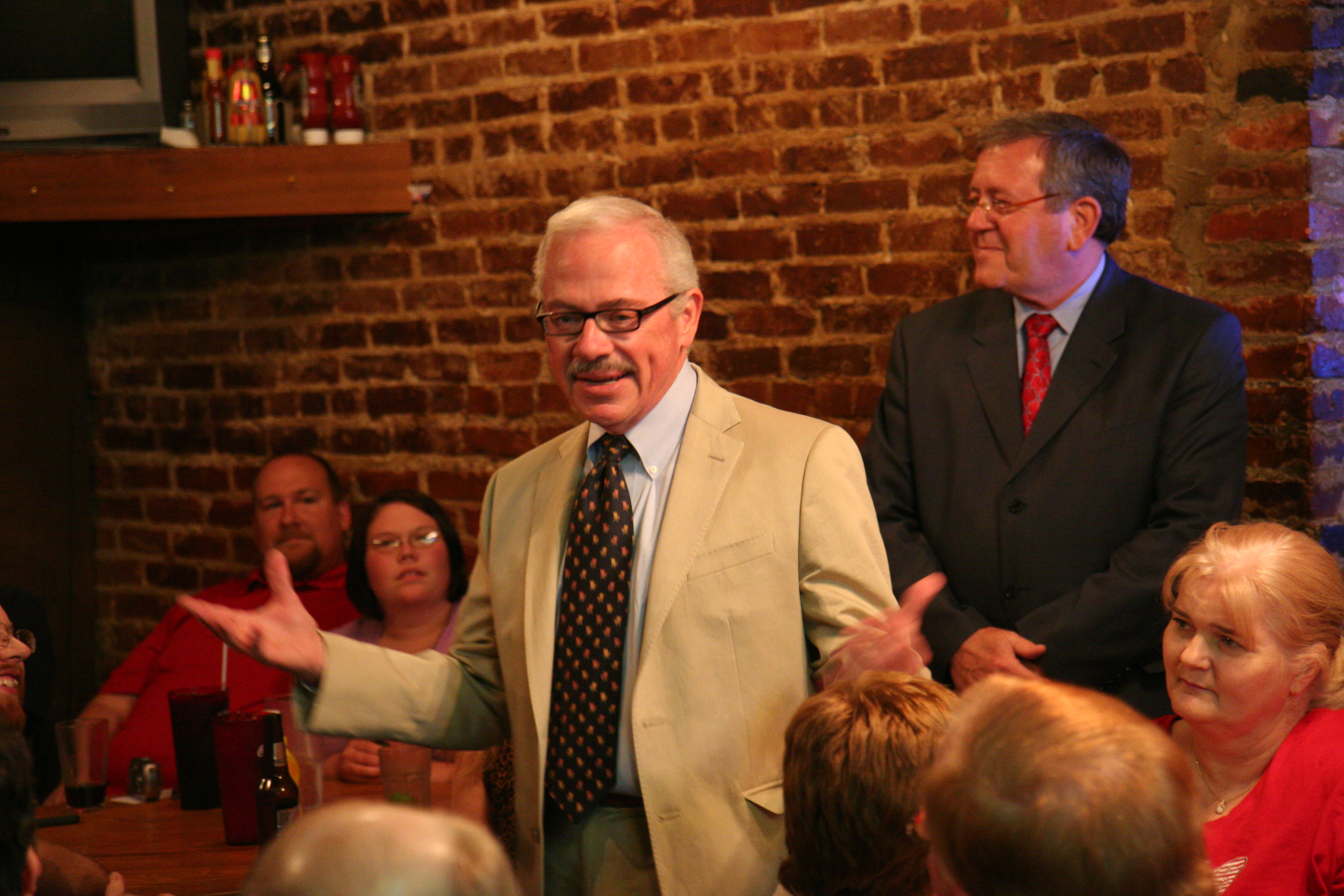
Barr at a Libertarian Meetup in June 2008

Although the campaign garnered $300,000 in donations by June 28, Barr had yet to hold a campaign fundraiser or film television advertisements.

On June 30, Barr appeared on Fox News Sunday with Chris Wallace. He described his qualms with the presumptive Republican nominee, and said "John McCain is symptomatic of what's wrong with the Republican Party in these first years of the 21st century. They talk one thing but do something different." When asked if he agreed that McCain would be a better choice than Barack Obama, he responded that it was "a mixed bag" and that "Senator Obama clearly is much better [on] civil liberties and privacy issues" but that he "would favor a more expansive federal spending policy." Barr opined that "neither of these candidates is talking about the deep cuts in government spending and returning power to the people." He identified the Republican Party's position on FISA legislation as his biggest aversion to the party. When confronted with opinion polls that showed the candidate with 3% in the presidential race, Barr explained that the numbers would increase in the following weeks, announcing that his campaign would be launched "full-time" on July 4.

=== Full-time escalation ===
Barr launched his "full-time" campaign at Atlanta's Fourth of July parade, where the city celebrated the opening of the Millennium Gate arch. Democratic Congressman John Lewis spoke alongside Barr at the dedication.

The next week, Barr appeared on Fox News, where he criticized the United States Treasury Department's plan to help Freddie Mac and Fannie Mae. His opposition was based on the government's use of taxpayer money to credit the enterprises, explaining that "the taxpayers of this country are being put at further risk." But Barr did state that "doing nothing would not be advisable" and that the government "has to do something." He explained that Fannie Mae and Freddie Mac must be restructered. Barr was criticized by some Libertarians for these remarks.

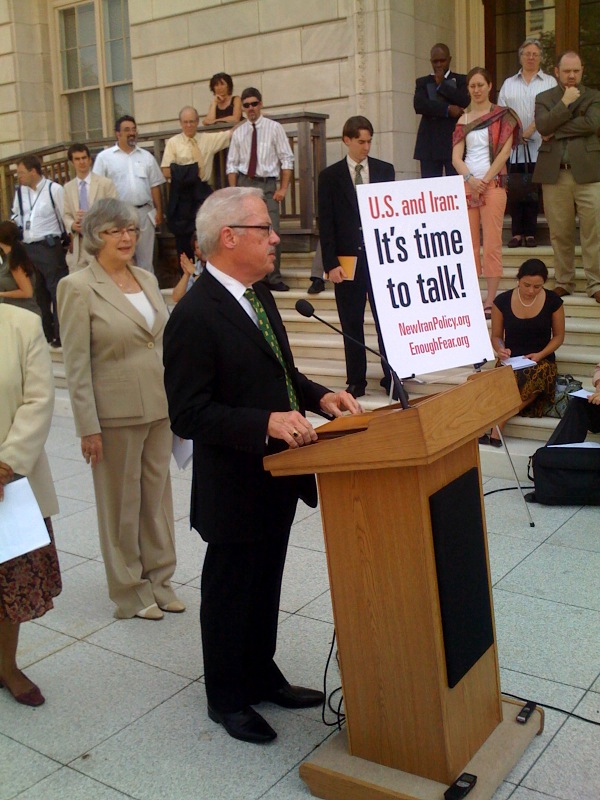
Bob Barr discussing Iran

During a visit to Austin for a fundraiser, Barr made a surprise appearance at the July 19 Netroots Nation convention. The candidate remarked at the meeting of progressive bloggers that "there are a lot of libertarians here, [and] a lot of [Barr] supporters." His presence was acknowledged by Speaker of the House Nancy Pelosi, who observed that "Bob Barr – even Bob Barr – opposed" the domestic spying bill that she was discussing. On July 23, CNN polling placed Barr at 3% in a four-way race, while Zogby placed Barr at 6%. He polled at 8% in Georgia, Colorado, Iowa, and Minnesota, and at 9% in Oklahoma, New Mexico, and Nevada. Surveys in New Hampshire put Barr at 10%.

In August, Barr spoke at the Minuteman Civil Defense Corps' protest during the Democratic National Convention in Denver. Approximately a dozen individuals were in attendance at the event. Former Republican candidates Tom Tancredo and Alan Keyes also attended the event, which organizers called a success. Barr presented a "common sense" approach to the issue by promising to put an end to birthright citizenship and public education for illegal immigrants, while supporting an increase in green cards. Claremont McKenna College professor John Pitney argued that the candidate was sending mixed messages since "the Libertarian Party essentially supports open borders," and was unlikely to gain the support of anti-immigration activists. A Zogby poll released on August 15, 2008, indicated that most Republicans and Democrats wanted Barr included in the presidential debates. The poll also indicated that nearly 70% of independent voters would have liked to see him included.

=== Final stages ===
As September began, commentator Greg Pierce of The Washington Times noted that the "grass-roots enthusiasm for [Barr's] candidacy seems to have faded a bit in the wake of individualist Governor Sarah Palin joining the Republican ticket."

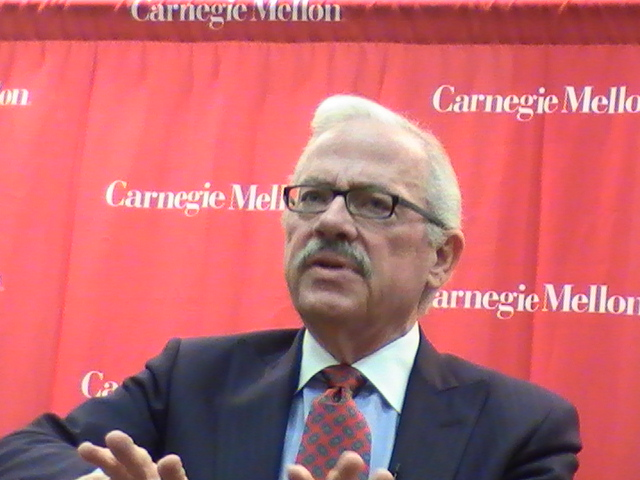
Bob Barr speaks in October 2008.

Endorsements
- Deirdre McCloskey, Professor of economics and other subjects.
- Alan Gura, attorney.
- Penn Jillette, magician and comedian.
- Daniel Imperato, entrepreneur and former presidential candidate.
- James Bovard,
- Nick Gillespie,
- Jacob Sullum,
- Jesse Walker,
- Matt Welch,
- Jack Shafer, libertarian writer at Slate.

It was announced at a press conference on September 10, 2008, that former Republican presidential candidate Ron Paul would give his open endorsement to Constitution Party nominee Chuck Baldwin, Green Party nominee Cynthia McKinney, independent Ralph Nader, and Barr, in opposition to the Republican and Democratic Parties' nominees. Barr chose not to attend the event, and his name was not included in the final statement released by the other candidates. Paul had previously made favorable comments about Barr's campaign, leaving the candidate to feel that he alone should have received the endorsement. Later that day, it was revealed that Barr had earlier offered the Libertarian vice-presidential nomination to Paul, via a letter. The letter stated that Barr's current running mate, Wayne Allyn Root, would willingly step down should Paul accept the offer. A spokesman for the Paul campaign called Barr's offer "terribly interesting", but added that Paul had no intentions of running on a third party ticket. Ron Paul dropped his endorsement of Barr on September 22, citing the candidate's criticism of his earlier endorsements. Paul opted to instead support Chuck Baldwin's candidacy. Barr received $252,383 of donations in September, which was slightly more than the $224,350 the campaign raised in August.

On the dawn of the final month of campaigning, Barr appeared on National Public Radio, and discussed his political positions, including those on health care, a topic that had rarely been discussed by Barr over the course of his campaign. Barr gave his shortest response to the issue, saying that "everybody ought to be able to get health care, but that's up to them..." and went on to say that "the government could be...reducing and removing the onerous regulations that actually prevent people from being able to afford health care." Close to the end of the campaign, Barr's polling numbers remained stagnant. An Associated Press-GfK poll from late October placed the candidate at 1% nationally, the same figure he had stood at three weeks previously.

== Ballot access ==
Barr achieved ballot access in the above states colored yellow, but did not appear on the ballot in Louisiana after failing to register before the state's deadline.

Barr achieved ballot access in 45 states according to the Libertarian Party website. This was the first time since 1988 that the Libertarian ticket did not have access to over 500 electoral votes. He was denied access in Oklahoma after failing to reach the minimum threshold of petition signatures. In July, the campaign filed a lawsuit against the state to try to get the candidate on the ballot despite not meeting the guidelines. Barr also filed lawsuits in Massachusetts, West Virginia and Maine to appear on the ballot under similar circumstances. Barr's plea in West Virginia failed on September 7 after U.S. District Court Judge John T. Copenhaver Jr. dismissed the lawsuit. The judge proclaimed that "it was their (the campaign's) lack of reasonable diligence that ultimately thwarted their effort to gain ballot access here" in West Virginia.

Lawsuits were filed against Barr by GOP members in Pennsylvania to prevent the candidate from appearing on the state's ballot on charges that the Libertarian Party tricked individuals into signing the state's ballot access petition. Commonwealth Court Judge Johnny Butler dismissed these allegations on September 16, allowing Barr to remain on the state's ballot. The Barr campaign filed a lawsuit to prevent John McCain and Barack Obama from appearing on the ballot in Texas, charging that the candidates' parties did not reach the state's August 26 deadline to report their nominations to the Secretary of State. Texas Secretary of State Esperanza Andrade reported that all the correct paperwork was filed, though neither the Democratic nor Republican parties formally nominated their candidates (at their respective conventions) until after the deadline. On September 23, 2008, the Texas Supreme Court rejected Barr's request without giving a reason.

On September 26, 2008, the Louisiana Supreme Court reversed an earlier decision to keep Barr and Root on the ballot, and ordered that they both be removed due to missing the state's deadline, which passed while state offices were closed due to Hurricane Gustav. The Barr-Root campaign announced that it planned to appeal to the U.S. Supreme Court. The court refused to hear the case, and Barr's name was absent from the state's ballot on election day.

== Results ==
Barr's campaign ended after receiving 523,686 (0.4%) of the popular vote on Election Day. He finished in fourth place, winning a higher percentage than the 2004 Libertarian nominee Michael Badnarik. 67,582 of his votes were won in California, the nation's most populous state, but Barr won his largest percentage in Indiana with 1.1%. Reason Magazine's Brian Doherty commented that Barr's showing did not meet earlier expectations. He wrote that Barr did not win a significant percentage of the population because he was "not Libertarian enough," distanced himself too far from Ron Paul, and lacked adequate "communication and coordination."

== Aftermath ==
Following the campaign, Barr was certified as a mediator to resolve disputes upon request. He currently writes a regular column for The Atlanta Journal-Constitution titled "The Barr Code", and is a contributor for CNN. In his column, he discusses privacy issues and often criticizes the Obama administration, disapproving of the effect of its spending on the federal budget. He has become involved in the Tea Party movement, and has left the Libertarian Party, rejoining the Republicans. He supported former running mate Wayne Allyn Root's bid to be chairman of the Party. Root was considered a potential 2012 Libertarian presidential candidate. He did not run, and like Barr, rejoined the Republican Party.

Barr reflected on the campaign in an interview with Reason shortly after the election. He explained that his campaign's inability to gain access to donor lists hindered the campaign's fundraising capacity. In April 2009, he commented that his exclusion from the presidential debates prevented his campaign from gaining significant traction. Barr said he would not run for public office in the future. However, he attempted to regain his seat in Congress in 2014, losing in the Republican Party primary runoff election.

In May 2010, the Barr campaign was sued by libertarian pundit Jim Bovard, who was hired to ghostwrite a book about the campaign. Bovard claims he was never paid the $47,000 he was to receive for his efforts. Campaign manager Russ Verney stated that the campaign hoped to raise enough money to pay Bovard, and asked for donations. The ensuing litigation resulted in a judgment entered for Bovard against the Barr 2008 Presidential Committee, Inc., in the full amount of $47,000.00.

== See also ==
- Comparison of United States presidential candidates, 2008
- Electoral history of Bob Barr
- List of candidates in the United States presidential election, 2008
- Political positions of Bob Barr
- United States third party and independent presidential candidates, 2008
