= 2008 Libertarian Party presidential primaries =

- February 5, 2008

Non-binding preferential vote

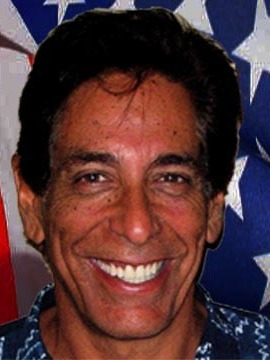

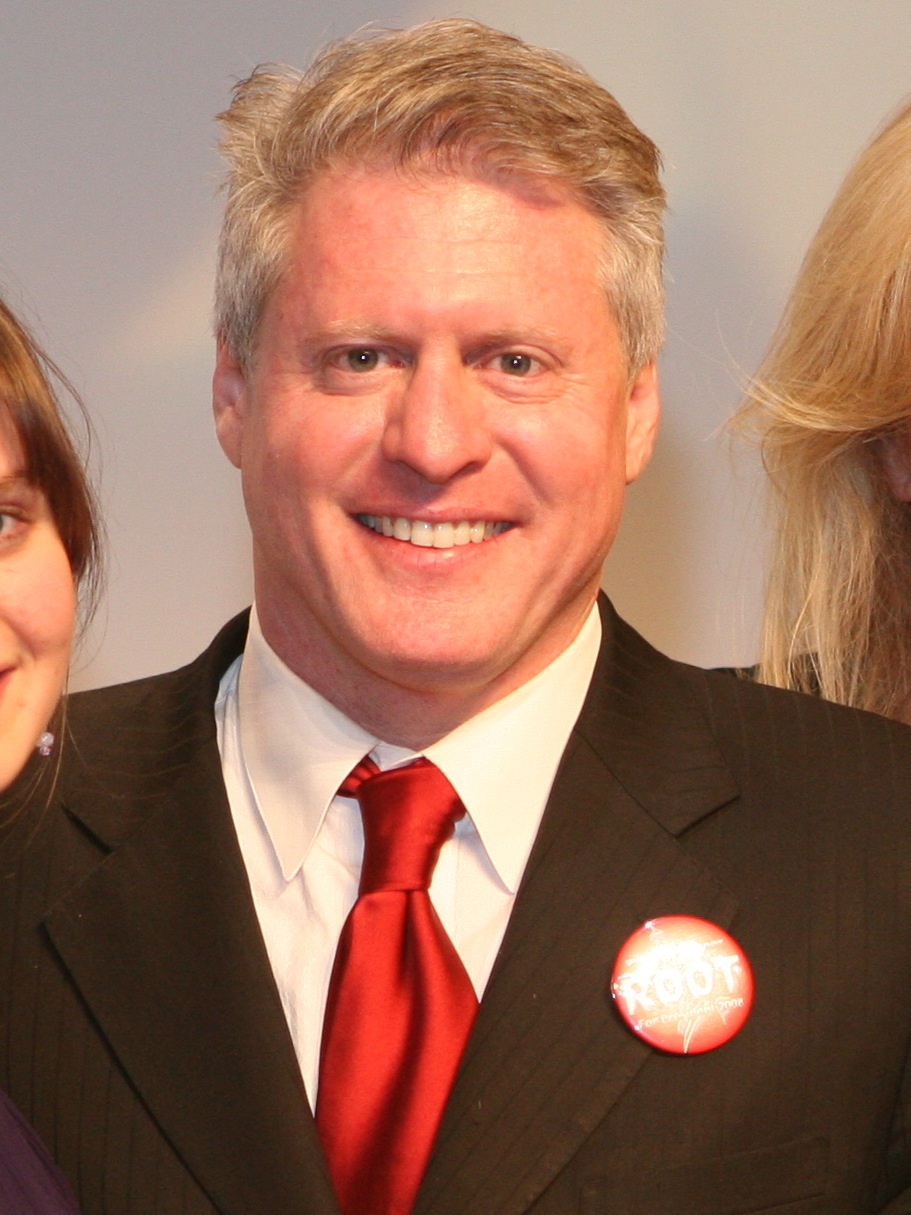

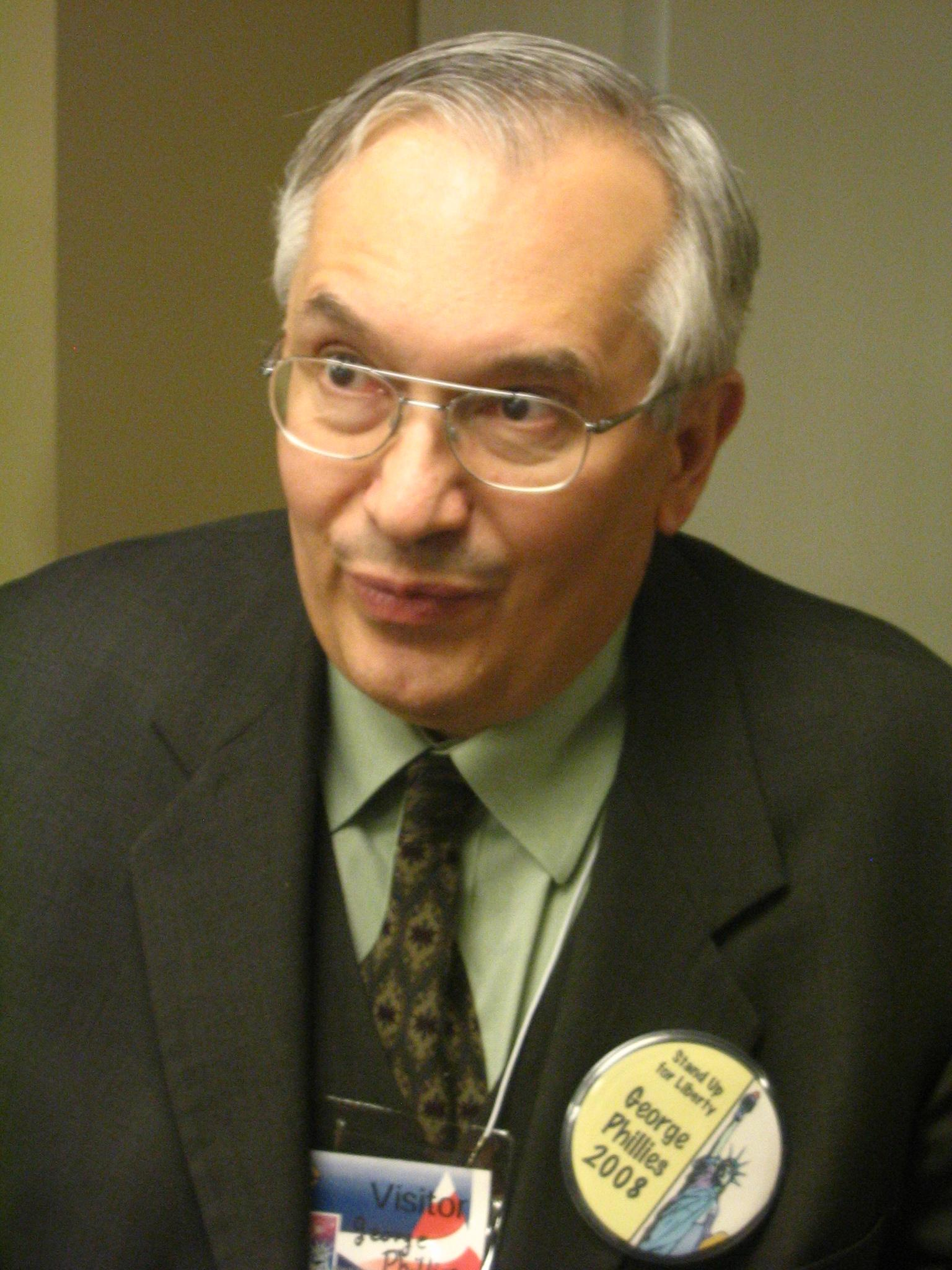

| Candidate | Christine Smith | Steve Kubby | Wayne Allyn Root |
| Home state | Colorado | California | Nevada |
| Contests won | 1 | 0 | 0 |
| Popular vote | 4,241 | 3,072 | 2,730 |
| Percentage | 22.4% | 16.2% | 14.4% |
| Candidate | Bob Jackson | George Phillies | Uncommitted |
| Home state | | Massachusetts | n/a |
| Contests won | 0 | 0 | 1 |
| Popular vote | 1,486 | 1,015 | 967 |
| Percentage | 7.9% | 5.4% | 5.1% |
First place by popular vote
Christine Smith (1)
Uncommitted (1)
No contest
Previous Libertarian nominee
Michael Badnarik
Libertarian nominee
Bob Barr

The 2008 Libertarian Party presidential primaries allowed voters to indicate non-binding preferences for the Libertarian Party's presidential candidate. These differed from the Republican or Democratic presidential primaries and caucuses in that they did not appoint delegates to represent a candidate at the party's convention to select the party's nominee for the United States presidential election. The party's nominee for the 2008 presidential election was chosen directly by registered delegates at the 2008 Libertarian National Convention, which ran from May 22 to 26, 2008. The delegates nominated former congressman Bob Barr (who did not run in the primaries) for president and media personality Wayne Allyn Root for vice president.

Two primaries were held, one in Missouri and one in California. A total of 18,915 votes were cast in these primaries.

== Candidates ==
| Candidate | Profession | Campaign | On primary ballot | | Popular vote |
| Candidate | Profession | Campaign | CA | MO | Popular vote |
|---|---|---|---|---|---|
| Christine Smith | Writer | | Yes | No | 4,241 |
| Steve Kubby | Libertarian activist, 1998 California gubernatorial nominee | | Yes | Yes | 3,072 |
| Wayne Allyn Root | Businessman, media personality, author, TV producer | | Yes | Yes | 2,730 |
| Bob Jackson | Engineer | | Yes | No | 1,486 |
| George Phillies | College professor | | Yes | Yes | 1,015 |
| Barry Hess | 2002 and 2006 Libertarian nominee for Arizona governor | | Yes | No | 891 |
| Mike Jingozian | Businessman | | Yes | Yes | 853 |
| Daniel Imperato | Businessman | | Yes | Yes | 848 |
| Dave Hollist | Activist | | Yes | Yes | 819 |
| Robert Milnes | Journalist | | Yes | No | 721 |
| John Finan | Activist | | Yes | No | 706 |
| Alden Link | Company manager | | Yes | No | 565 |
Alternate ballot options:
| Uncommitted | N/A | | No | Yes | 967 |

== Primaries and caucuses ==
National totals
| Candidate | Votes | % | First-place primary/caucus finishes |
|---|---|---|---|
| Christine Smith | 4,241 | 22.42% | 1 |
| Steve Kubby | 3,072 | 16.24% | —N/a |
| Wayne Allen Root | 2,730 | 14.43% | —N/a |
| Bob Jackson | 1,486 | 7.86% | —N/a |
| George Phillies | 1,015 | 5.37% | —N/a |
| Barry Hess | 891 | 4.71% | —N/a |
| Uncommitted/uninstructed | 885 | 4.68% | 1 |
| Mike Jingozian | 853 | 4.51% | —N/a |
| Daniel Imperato | 848 | 4.48% | —N/a |
| Dave Hollist | 819 | 4.33% | —N/a |
| Robert Milnes | 721 | 3.81% | —N/a |
| John Finan | 706 | 3.73% | —N/a |
| Alden Link | 565 | 2.99% | —N/a |
| Leon L. Ray | 1 | 0.00% | —N/a |

=== California primary ===
Type: Semi-Closed

In the California primary on February 5, the Libertarian Party had a state-run primary held alongside those for the Republicans, Democrats, the Green Party, the American Independent Party and the Peace and Freedom Party.

California Libertarian presidential primary, February 5, 2008
| Candidate | Votes | Percentage |
|---|---|---|
| Christine Smith | 4,241 | 25.2 |
| Steve Kubby | 2,876 | 17.1 |
| Wayne Allyn Root | 2,360 | 14.0 |
| Bob Jackson | 1,486 | 8.9 |
| Barry Hess | 891 | 5.3 |
| George Phillies | 852 | 5.1 |
| Mike Jingozian | 774 | 4.6 |
| Robert Milnes | 721 | 4.3 |
| Daniel Imperato | 707 | 4.1 |
| John Finan | 706 | 4.1 |
| Dave Hollist | 678 | 4.0 |
| Alden Link | 565 | 3.3 |
| Leon L. Ray (write-in) | 1 | nil |
| Total | 16,858 | 100 |

=== Missouri primary ===
In the Missouri primary on February 5, the Libertarian Party had a state-run primary held alongside the Republican and Democratic primaries.

Missouri Libertarian presidential primary, February 5, 2008
| Candidate | Votes | Percentage |
|---|---|---|
| Uncommitted | 967 | 47.0 |
| Wayne Allyn Root | 370 | 18.0 |
| Steve Kubby | 196 | 9.5 |
| George Phillies | 163 | 7.9 |
| Dave Hollist | 141 | 6.9 |
| Daniel Imperato | 141 | 6.9 |
| Mike Jingozian | 79 | 3.8 |
| Total | 2,057 | 100 |

== See also ==
Presidential primaries

- 2008 Democratic Party presidential primaries
- 2008 Green Party presidential primaries
- 2008 Republican Party presidential primaries

National Conventions

- 2008 Constitution Party National Convention
- 2008 Libertarian National Convention
- 2008 Green National Convention
- 2008 Democratic National Convention
- 2008 Republican National Convention
