= American Medical Marijuana Association =

American cannabis advocacy organization

- Formation: Formed in 1999 by Steve Kubby, Ed Rosenthal and Tod H. Mikuriya
- Type: Volunteer
- Headquarters: 17415 Ocean Dr., Fort Bragg, CA 95437
- Location: Online
- Website: americanmarijuana.org

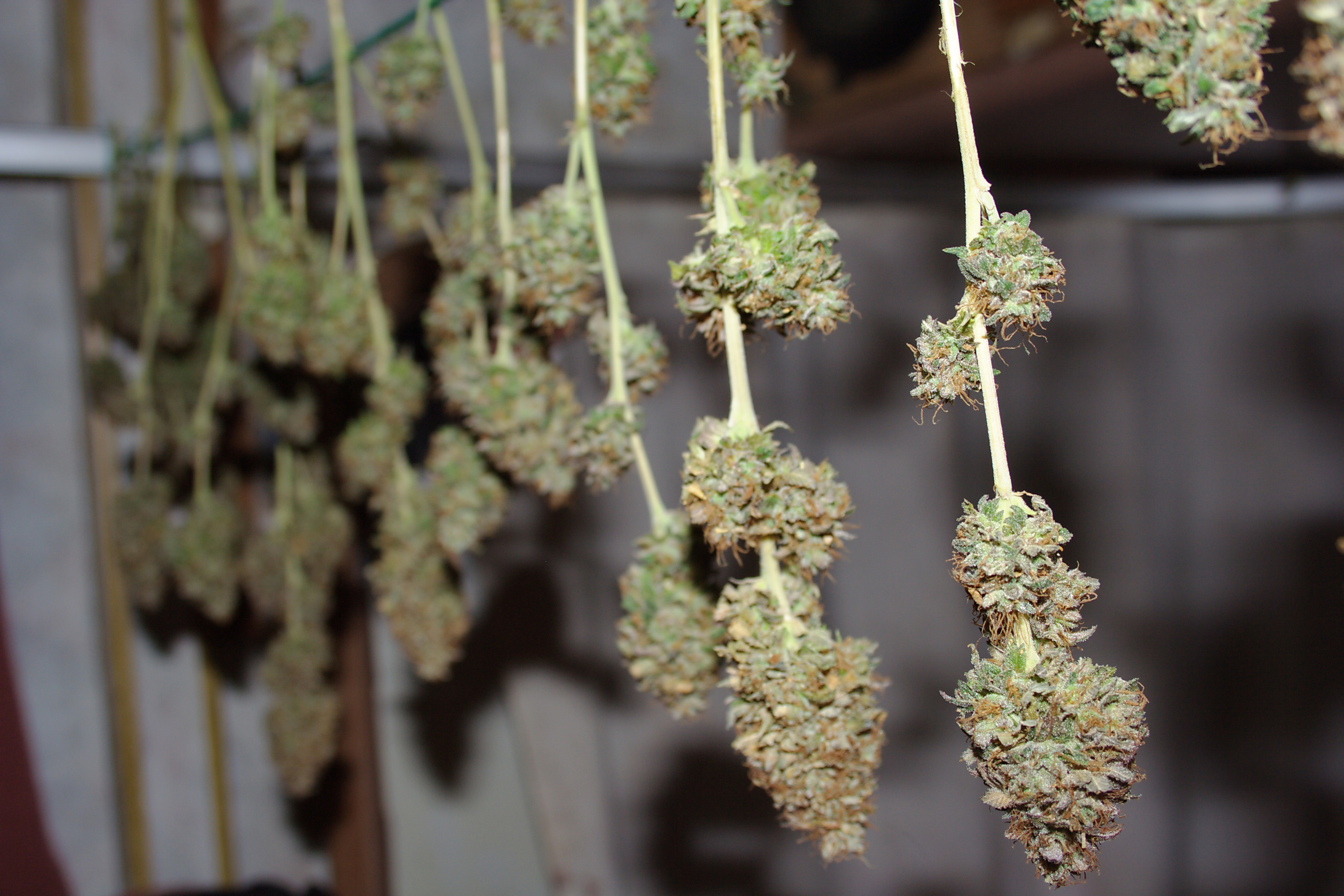
Medical Cannabis (Marijuana)

The American Medical Marijuana Association (AMMA) is an organization formed to promote and protect legal access to medical marijuana. AMMA was founded in Fort Bragg, California in 1999, by Steve Kubby, Ed Rosenthal, and Tod H. Mikuriya.

== Activism ==
AMMA strives to implement, preserve and protect medicinal cannabis patients through political activism. AMMA's activism includes aiding in the defense of cannabis patients should they be prosecuted for possessing medical marijuana. One way AMMA is able to do this is through the sharing of motions, writs, declarations, and demands.

== Advisors ==
- Richard Cowan: Former National Director of NORML. Member of the advisory board of the Drug Policy Foundation. Senior Policy Advisor to NORML. Editor and Publisher, marijuananews.
- Ed Rosenthal: He has written and edited more than a dozen books about marijuana cultivation and social policy.
- Rev. Lynnette Shaw: Founder and director of the Cannabis Buyers' Club Marin in Fairfax, California, licensed since 1997.

National Director

- Steve Kubby: Former Libertarian Party nominee for governor of California and author of two books on drug policy.
