= Thornton–Donovan School =

Location
- 100 Overlook Circle; New Rochelle, New York 10804; United States; 40°56′0″N 73°46′55″W

Information
- Type: Private School
- Established: 1901
- Students: 175
- Grades: K-12

The Thornton–Donovan School (TD) was founded as the New Rochelle School and Kindergarten in New Rochelle, New York in 1901. The first teacher and headmistress was Emily Scott Thornton, a Philadelphia native educated at University College Nottingham (now the University of Nottingham). The headmaster as of 2023 was Douglas E. Fleming, Jr.

The school is now at its third campus, on Overlook Circle in the Beechmont neighborhood of New Rochelle. It is in the buildings of three former homes, including the former Andrew Crawford estate (now the Main Building).

== Overview ==
The Thornton–Donovan School is New York State accredited and educates students in grades K-12.

=== 2008–2009 renovation ===
In early 2008, plans were being made to expand and level the field along with building a new basketball court. A proposal for the renovation was sent to the New Rochelle Department of Development Planning Board on June 24. The proposal stated that the field would be graded, ten irrigation sprinklers would be installed, the basketball court would be taken apart and relocated to allow more field space, a ten-foot chain link fence would enclose the new court, and twenty trees would be removed during the process. Headmaster Douglas Fleming has referred to the final product as the Field of Dreams.

=== Summer challenge program ===
In the summer, the school also holds a summer camp program, this program is for children aged 3–14. The children are split into two divisions: Play School (3–7 years) and Sports Fitness (7–14 years).

== Thematic language education ==
Middle and Upper School curricula are themed annually on an area of the world. The school has 35 sister schools in Europe, Asia, and Latin America. During the school year, students are selected to go to one of several sister schools for an exchange program.

== The arts and community connections ==
- There is a mural, "The Constellations", on the first floor of the main building.
- There is a mural, "Aspirational Music", by Lumen Martin Winter in the school's main building.
- The school has connections to Lions Clubs International, a worldwide service organization.

== Notable alumni ==
- Wayne Allyn Root – the 2008 United States Libertarian Party vice-presidential nominee. He attended the school from 1977 to 1979 when he graduated.
- Joey Kramer - The drummer from Aerosmith.

== Headmasters ==
- Emily Scott Thornton – 1901–1945
- Genevieve F. Berns – 1945–1968
- Douglas E. Fleming Jr. – 1968–2025
- Virginia Keating-Miller – 2025–present
