= Mary Ruwart =

American scientist, libertarian activist, and politician (born 1949)

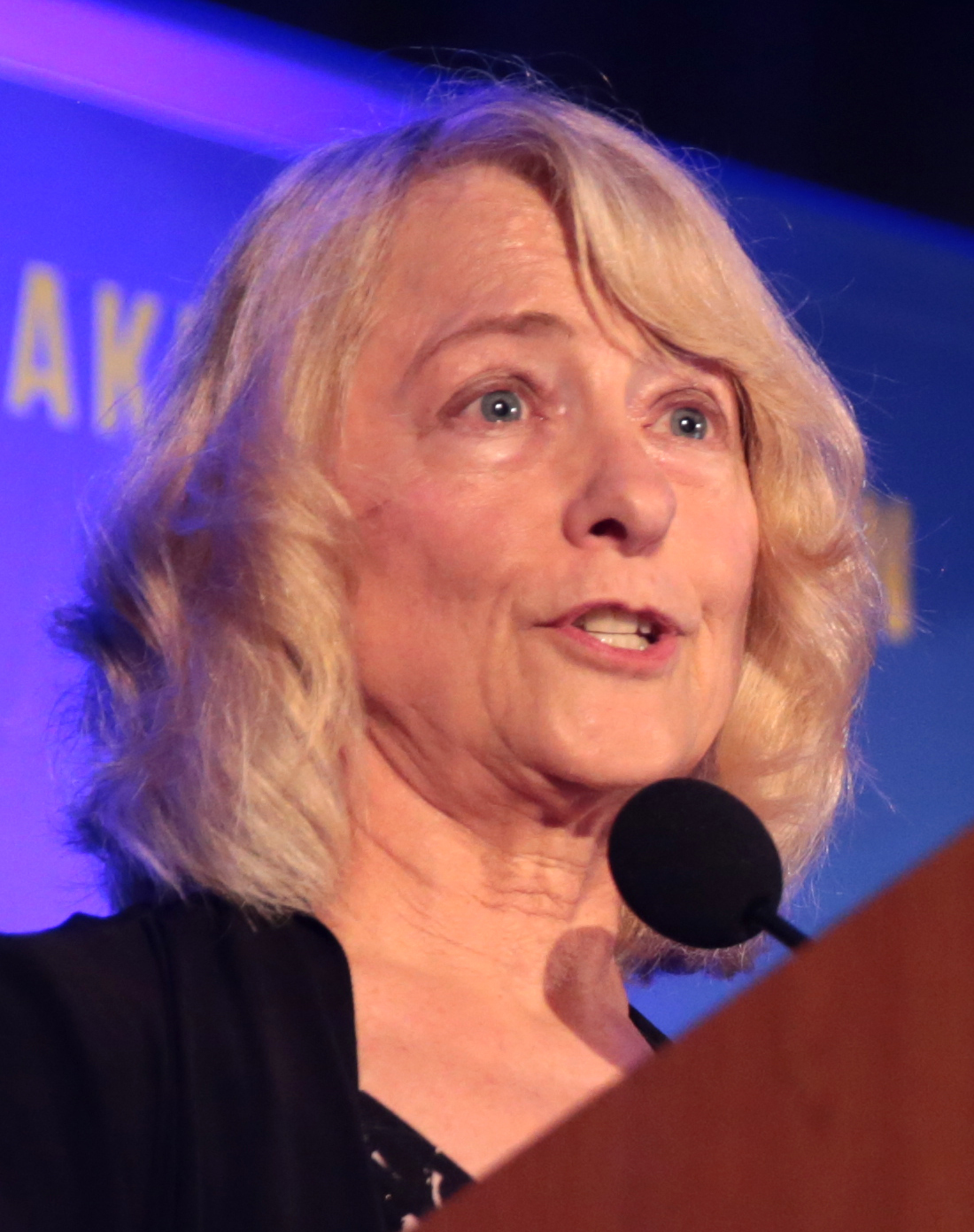
- Ruwart in 2018

Chair of the Libertarian Party Judicial Committee
- In office July 12, 2020 – May 29, 2022
- Preceded by: Chuck Moulton
- Succeeded by: Ken Moellman

Personal details
- Born: October 16, 1949 (age 76) Detroit, Michigan, U.S.
- Party: Libertarian
- Education: Michigan State University (PhD)
- Occupation: Author, activist
- Website: Official website

Mary J. Ruwart (born October 16, 1949) is an American retired biomedical researcher and a libertarian speaker, writer, and activist. She was a leading candidate for the 2008 Libertarian Party presidential nomination and is the author of the book Healing Our World.

== Early life, education, and medical career ==
Ruwart was born in Detroit, Michigan. She holds a Bachelor of Science with a major in biochemistry (1970), and a doctorate in biophysics (1974) from Michigan State University. After a 2½ year term on the faculty of the Department of Surgery at Saint Louis University School of Medicine, Ruwart spent 19 years as a pharmaceutical research scientist for Upjohn Pharmaceuticals, and has written extensively on the subjects of government regulation of the drug industry and on libertarian communication.

== Libertarian activism and candidacies ==
A member of the Libertarian Party, Ruwart campaigned unsuccessfully for the party's presidential nomination in 1984 and for the vice-presidential nomination in 1992. Ruwart was the Libertarian Party of Texas's nominee for U.S. Senate in 2000, where she faced incumbent Republican Kay Bailey Hutchison; Ruwart polled 1.16% of the popular vote (72,798 votes), finishing fourth of four candidates behind Green Party candidate Douglas Sandage.

Ruwart has served on the Libertarian National Committee, and was a keynote speaker at the 2004 Libertarian National Convention. In 2002, libertarians launched an unsuccessful lobbying campaign to get Dr. Ruwart appointed Food and Drug Administration (FDA) Commissioner. Additionally, Ruwart has served on the boards of the International Society for Individual Liberty, the Fully Informed Jury Association, and the Michigan chapter of the Heartland Institute. Ruwart is a longtime supporter of the Free State Project and officially endorsed it on May 17, 2008 while on-air on Free Talk Live.

Ruwart unsuccessfully ran for Texas Comptroller in 2010 against incumbent Republican Susan Combs. She received 417,523 votes (10.5%) in a race that had no Democrat.

=== 2008 presidential campaign ===
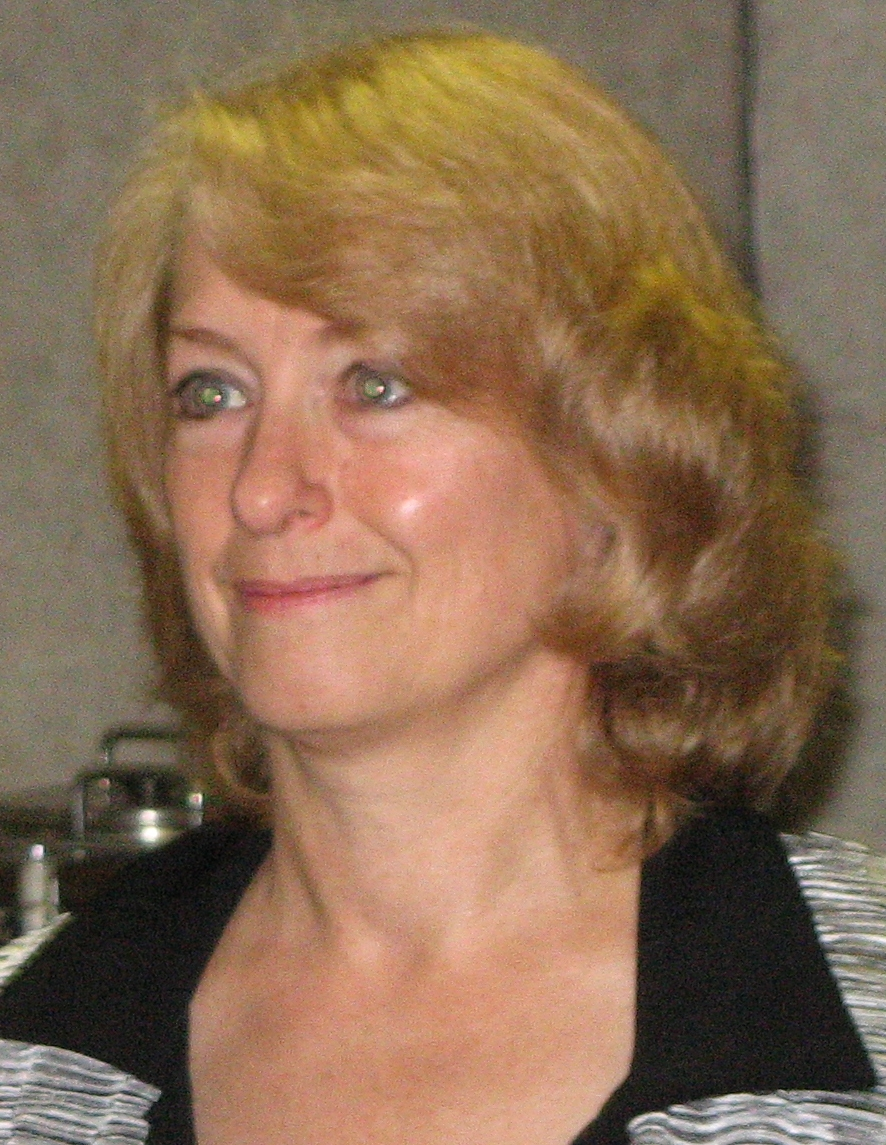
Ruwart campaigning for the Libertarian presidential nomination in 2008

In March 2008, in response to an informal draft effort by a group of Libertarian Party activists, Ruwart announced her candidacy for the Libertarian presidential nomination in the 2008 election. She ran on a platform of ending military intervention overseas and nation-building, ending torture, ending foreign aid, promoting free trade, eliminating welfare entitlements and creating jobs by slashing government spending.

She lost the nomination to Bob Barr on the sixth ballot at the 2008 Libertarian National Convention on May 25, 2008. Despite tying with Barr on the third and fourth ballots and taking the lead on the fifth, she ultimately lost after third-placed candidate Wayne Allyn Root threw his support behind Barr. Root later received the vice-presidential nomination.

== Child pornography comment ==
Leading to the 2008 Libertarian Party nomination, Ruwart replied to the question of "How can a libertarian argue against child pornography?": "Children who willingly participate in sexual acts have the right to make that decision as well, even if it’s distasteful to us personally. Some children will make poor choices just as some adults do in smoking and drinking to excess. When we outlaw child pornography, the prices paid for child performers rise, increasing the incentives for parents to use children against their will."

== Bibliography ==
- Ruwart, Mary (1993). Healing Our World: The Other Piece of the Puzzle. Kendall, Frances; Louw, Leon (foreword). SunStar Press. ISBN 978-0-9632336-2-2.
- Ruwart, Mary (1998). Short Answers to the Tough Questions: How to Answer the Questions Libertarians Are Often Asked. SunStar Press. ISBN 978-0-9632336-5-3.
- Ruwart, Mary (2003). Healing Our World: In An Age of Aggression. Kendall, Frances; Louw, Leon (foreword). SunStar Press. ISBN 978-0-9632336-6-0.
- Ruwart, Mary (2015). Healing Our World: The Compassion of Libertarianism. Paul, Ron (foreword). SunStar Press. ISBN 978-0-9632336-7-7.
- Ruwart, Mary (2018). Death by Regulation: How We Were Robbed of a Golden Age of Health and How We Can Reclaim It. Paul, Ron (foreword); Wright, Jonathan (preface); Gamble, Foster (afterword). SunStar Press. ISBN 978-0-9632336-1-5.

== See also ==
- 2008 Libertarian National Convention
- 2012 Libertarian National Convention
- R. Lee Wrights
