= 2008 Libertarian National Convention =

United States political event

- 2008 presidential election

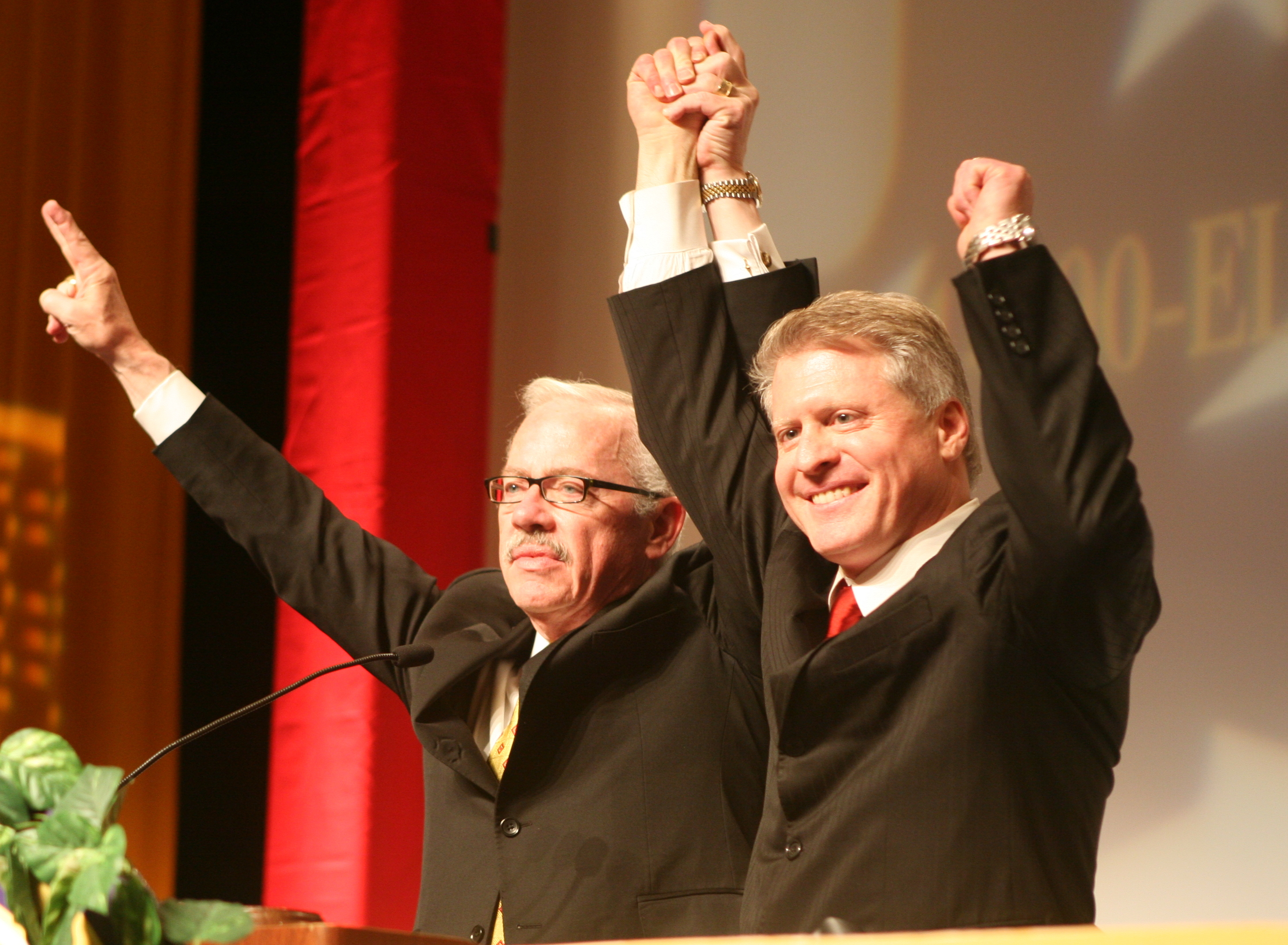
- Nominees; Barr and Root

Convention
- Date(s): May 22–26, 2008
- City: Denver, Colorado
- Venue: Sheraton Hotel
- Chair: Bill Redpath
- Notable speakers: Dr. Mary Ruwart

Candidates
- Presidential nominee: Bob Barr of Georgia
- Vice-presidential nominee: Wayne Allyn Root of Nevada
- Other candidates: Mary Ruwart of Texas; Mike Gravel of Alaska; Steve Kubby of California, activist George Phillies of Massachusetts

Sites of the 2008 national presidential nominating conventions

The 2008 Libertarian National Convention was held from May 22 to May 26, 2008, at the Sheraton Hotel (formerly the Adam's Mark Hotel) in Denver, Colorado. The delegates at the convention, on behalf of the U.S. Libertarian Party, nominated Bob Barr for president and Wayne Allyn Root for vice president in the 2008 presidential election. The convention was televised nationally on C-SPAN.

Libertarians hold a national convention every two years to vote on party bylaws, platform and resolutions and elect national party officers and a judicial committee. Every four years it nominates presidential and vice presidential candidates.

The theme of this convention was A Better Choice for America.

Two non-binding primaries preceded the convention.

== Platform ==
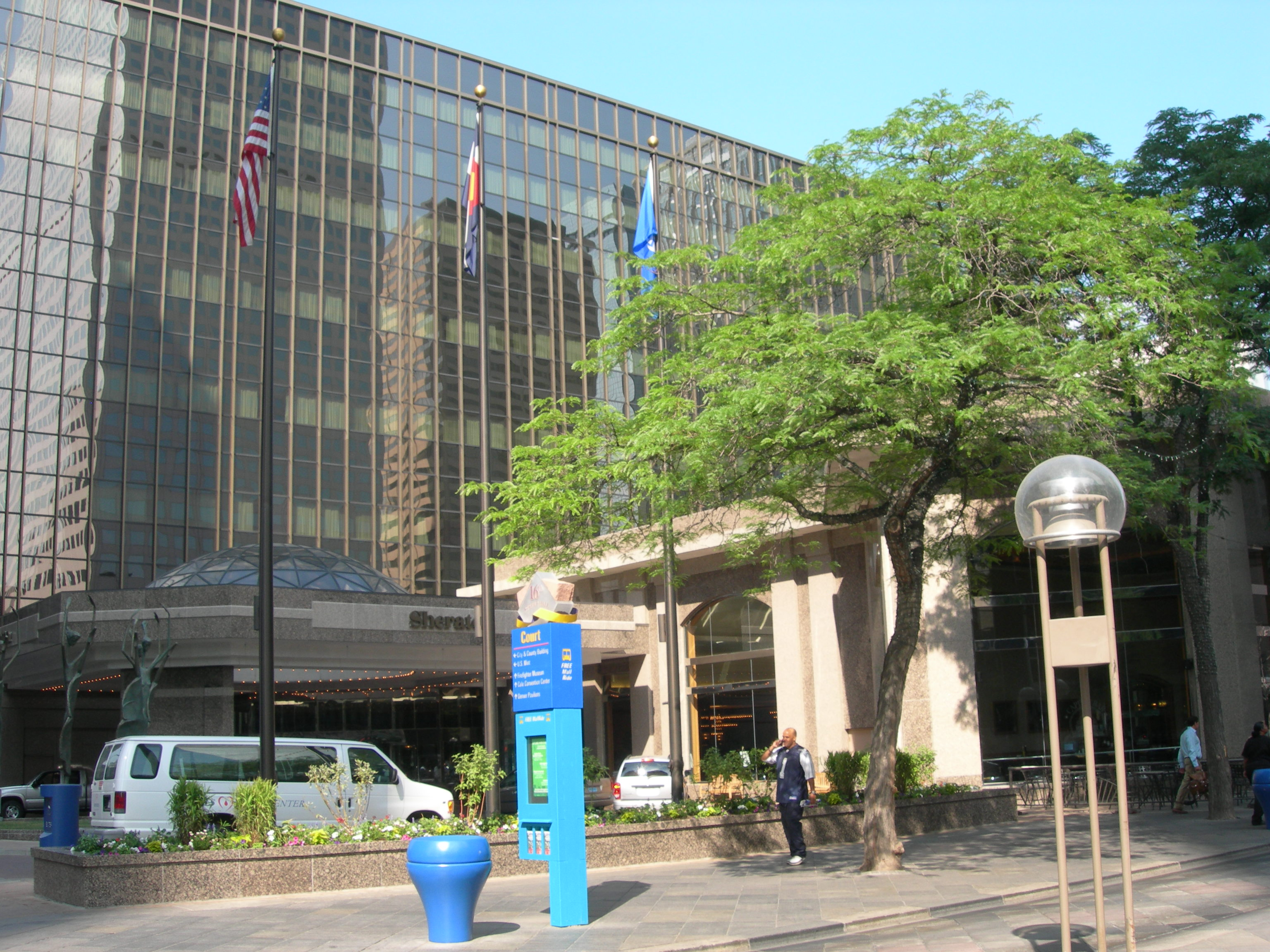
Sheraton Hotel, where convention was held

In 2006 the self-styled Libertarian Party "reformers" at the National Convention in Portland, Oregon took out 46 platform planks detailing party positions, leaving just fifteen. In 2008 more "radical" libertarians attempted to restore that platform. They did not succeed, but they narrowly prevented the reformers from softening the language of the non-aggression principle in the party's “Statement of Principles”. The revised platform did replace the plank on secession, deleted in 2006, with a definition of self-determination drawn from the Declaration of Independence: "Whenever any form of government becomes destructive of individual liberty, it is the right of the people to alter or to abolish it, and to agree to such new governance as to them shall seem most likely to protect their liberty."

== Presidential candidates ==
Libertarian Party presidential candidates, 2008
Candidate	Home state	Profession	Campaign
Bob Barr	Georgia	Member of the U.S. House of Representatives from Georgia's 7th district (1995–2003)	(Campaign • Positions • Website)
Mike Gravel	Alaska	U.S. Senator from Alaska (1969–1981)	(Campaign • Positions • Website)
Daniel Imperato	Florida	Businessman	
Mike Jingozian	Oregon	Software developer	
Steve Kubby	California	Libertarian activist	(Campaign)
Robert Milnes	New Jersey	Activist	
George Phillies	Massachusetts	Professor of Physics at Worcester Polytechnic Institute	
Wayne Allyn Root	Nevada	Businessman, media personality, author, TV producer	(Campaign)
Mary Ruwart	Texas	Retired biomedical researcher; Libertarian speaker, writer, and activist	(Campaign)
Christine Smith	Colorado	Humanitarian activist, and writer	

== Voting for presidential nomination ==
=== First ballot ===
After the first round, six of the eight candidates running moved on to the second round of voting. Mike Jingozian and Christine Smith were both eliminated due to their small percentage of votes. Jingozian endorsed former Senator Mike Gravel, and Smith presented a speech attacking Bob Barr after the results were announced.

2008 Libertarian Party National Convention total vote count: Round 1
Candidate	Total votes cast	Percent of votes cast
Bob Barr	153	24.3%
Mary Ruwart	152	24.1%
Wayne Allyn Root	123	19.5%
Mike Gravel	71	11.3%
George Phillies	49	7.8%
Steve Kubby	41	6.5%
Mike Jingozian	23	3.7%
Christine Smith	6	1.0%
Ron Paul (write-in)	6	1.0%
Penn Jillette (write-in)	3	0.5%
NOTA	2	0.3%
Daniel Imperato (write-in)	1	0.2%
Stephen Colbert (write-in)	1	0.2%
	Color key: / 1st place / 2nd place / 3rd place / 4th place / 5th place / 6th place / 7th place	

=== Second ballot ===
After the second round, five of the six candidates running moved on to the third ballot. Steve Kubby, after receiving only 5% of the total vote, dropped out of the race and endorsed Dr. Mary Ruwart.

2008 Libertarian Party National Convention total vote count: Round 2
Candidate	Total votes cast	Percent of votes cast
Bob Barr	188	29.8%
Mary Ruwart	162	25.7%
Wayne Allyn Root	138	21.9%
Mike Gravel	73	11.6%
George Phillies	36	5.7%
Steve Kubby	32	5.1%
NOTA	1	0.2%
Stephen Colbert (write-in)	1	0.2%
	Color key: / 1st place / 2nd place / 3rd place / 4th place / 5th place / 6th place (tied)	

=== Third ballot ===
After the third round of voting, four of the five remaining candidates moved on to the fourth ballot. Dr. George Phillies was eliminated after receiving approximately 5% of the vote.

2008 Libertarian Party National Convention total vote count: Round 3
Candidate	Total votes cast	Percent of votes cast
Bob Barr	186	29.6%
Mary Ruwart	186	29.6%
Wayne Allyn Root	146	23.3%
Mike Gravel	78	12.4%
George Phillies	31	4.9%
Ron Paul (write-in)	1	0.2%
	Color key: / 1st place (tied) / 2nd place / 3rd place / 4th place	

=== Fourth ballot ===
After the fourth vote, three of the four candidates went on to the fifth round of voting. Fmr. Sen. Mike Gravel was eliminated after not getting a sufficient number of votes, and subsequently announced that his political career was over.

2008 Libertarian Party National Convention total vote count: Round 4
Candidate	Total votes cast	Percent of votes cast
Bob Barr	202	32.0%
Mary Ruwart	202	32.0%
Wayne Allyn Root	149	23.6%
Mike Gravel	76	12.0%
NOTA	3	0.5%
	Color key: / 1st place (tied) / 2nd place / 3rd place	

=== Fifth ballot ===
After the fifth ballot, the final two of three candidates continued on to the sixth ballot. Wayne Allyn Root was therefore eliminated, and after the vote, he made a speech endorsing Barr and stating that he would like to be Barr's candidate for vice-president. Barr and Root then stated that they would run together.

2008 Libertarian Party National Convention total vote count: Round 5
Candidate	Total votes cast	Percent of votes cast
Mary Ruwart	229	36.8%
Bob Barr	223	35.8%
Wayne Allyn Root	165	26.5%
NOTA	6	1.0%
	Color key: / 1st place / 2nd place / 3rd place	

=== Sixth ballot ===
With only Barr and Ruwart remaining on the ballot, Barr received 324 votes to Ruwart's 276 and 26 NOTA. Barr thus won the nomination with 51.8% of the final vote.

Ruwart made a concession speech following the announcement of the results with her campaign staff on the stage.

2008 Libertarian Party National Convention total vote count: Round 6
Candidate	Total votes cast	Percent of votes cast
Bob Barr	324	51.8%
Mary Ruwart	276	44.1%
NOTA	26	4.2%
	Color key: / 1st place / 2nd place	

== Voting for vice presidential nomination ==
A separate vote was held for the vice presidential nomination. Presidential nominee Barr endorsed Root, while presidential runner-up Ruwart endorsed Kubby.

=== First ballot ===
After the first ballot, three of the six active candidates running moved on to the second ballot.

2008 Libertarian Party National Convention total vote count: Round 1
Candidate	Total votes cast	Percent of votes cast
Wayne Allyn Root	269	47.7%
Steve Kubby	209	37.1%
Daniel Williams	40	7.1%
Jim Burns	27	4.8%
Gail Lightfoot	14	2.5%
NOTA	2	0.4%
Mike Ferguson (write-in)	1	0.2%
Mary Ruwart (write-in)	1	0.2%
Leonard Schwartz	1	0.2%
	Color key: / 1st place / 2nd place / 3rd place / 4th place	

=== Second ballot ===
After the second ballot, Wayne Allyn Root was nominated as the vice presidential candidate, prevailing by a difference of 30 votes over Steve Kubby, and 279 votes over Daniel Williams.

2008 Libertarian Party National Convention total vote count: Round 2
Candidate	Total votes cast	Percent of votes cast
Wayne Allyn Root	289	51.0%
Steve Kubby	259	45.7%
Daniel Williams	10	1.8%
NOTA	6	1.1%
Unknown Richard (write-in)	1	0.2%
Mike Ferguson (write-in)	1	0.2%
Mary Ruwart (write-in)	1	0.2%
	Color key: / 1st place / 2nd place / 3rd place (tied)	

== See also ==
- 2008 United States third-party presidential candidates
- Libertarian Party of Colorado
- Other 2008 American political conventions
  - Green Party
  - Democratic Party
  - Republican Party
