= Steve Kubby =

American politician and activist (1946–2022)

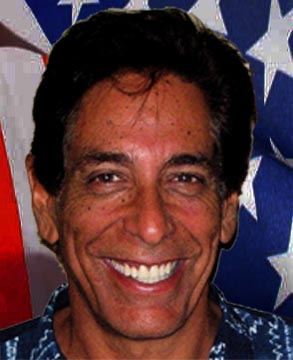
- Born: Steven Wynn Kubby; December 28, 1946; El Paso, Texas, U.S.
- Died: November 20, 2022 (aged 75); South Lake Tahoe, California
- Occupations: Author, public speaker, cannabis consultant and expert witness
- Writing career
- Literary movement: Libertarian writer and activist

Steven Wynn "Steve" Kubby (December 28, 1946 – November 20, 2022) was a Libertarian Party activist who played a key role in the drafting and passage of California Proposition 215. The proposition was a ballot initiative to legalize medical marijuana which was approved by voters in 1996. Kubby was known as a cancer patient who relied on medical cannabis.

Kubby authored two books on drug policy reform: The Politics of Consciousness (1995) and Why Marijuana Should Be Legal (2003). He was the Libertarian Party of California candidate for Governor of California in 1998, receiving 0.9% of the vote. In 2008, he declared his candidacy for the Libertarian Party's 2008 presidential nomination and received significant support for the nomination, but was eliminated after the second ballot.

Kubby died in South Lake Tahoe, California on November 20, 2022, aged 75.

== Cancer patient ==
In 1968, at the age of 23, Kubby began experiencing symptoms of hypertension and palpitations. He was diagnosed with malignant pheochromocytoma, a rare, fatal form of adrenal cancer. Kubby underwent surgery to remove a tumor in 1968, 1975 and 1976. This last time, his medical records show that the cancer had metastasised to his liver and beyond. All other patients with this diagnosis have had a 100% mortality rate within five years. His physician, Dr. Vincent DeQuattro, a specialist from the USC School of Medicine, monitored his condition and treated him with conventional therapies, including chemotherapy, until referring him to the Mayo Clinic in 1981 for yet another surgery and radiation.

For the next 25 years, Kubby maintained that he was able to control the symptoms of his disease solely by smoking marijuana and by maintaining a healthy diet. His original doctor, an expert on this condition shocked to learn he was still alive, said, "In some amazing fashion, this medication has not only controlled the symptoms of the pheochromocytoma, but in my view, has arrested its growth."

== Libertarian Party candidate ==
In the 1998 California gubernatorial election, Kubby was the Libertarian candidate for Governor of California, receiving 0.9% of the vote. The same year, he became national director of the American Medical Marijuana Association. Two months after the election, Kubby's home was raided by the Placer County sheriffs department. The officers seized 265 marijuana plants and a small quantity of peyote from a guest bedroom, and Kubby was arrested.

Kubby was a contender to be the Libertarian Party's vice presidential candidate in the 2000 election. The Libertarian Party requires the vice presidential candidate to be nominated by the delegates just as the presidential candidate is selected. Kubby was opposed by fellow Californian Art Olivier, and by Ken Krawchuk of Pennsylvania. After no candidate received a majority on the first ballot, Krawchuk withdrew his name from the ballot and endorsed Olivier, who then defeated Kubby by a vote of 418 to 338.

On August 20, 2006, at the Seattle Hempfest, Kubby announced his intention to seek the Libertarian Party's nomination for President in 2008. The Federal Election Committee (FEC) issued candidate ID numbers for Kubby personally and for the Kubby for President Committee on September 18, 2006. He had since campaigned at various community and Libertarian Party events and launched a campaign web site. He later endorsed Ron Paul for president, in the event that Ron Paul is able to secure the GOP nomination. Meanwhile, Kubby was continuing to actively campaign and has made Internet history with the first animated presidential campaign video. On May 25, 2008, Kubby did not gain his party's nomination and was eliminated after the second ballot at his party's national convention.

== Business ventures ==
Cannabis Sativa, Inc. announced on June 30, 2014, that Kubby was named chairman of the company. This was following Cannabis Sativa's acquisition of Kush Inc., previously owned by Kubby and the owner of the first patented marijuana plant.

== Arrest and trial ==
In 1996, Kubby was instrumental in the drafting and passage of California Proposition 215, The Compassionate Use Act of 1996. Despite the victory of Prop. 215, Kubby and his wife, Michele, were arrested, jailed and prosecuted, under the false claim that the voter initiative provides only an affirmative defense and that it is to be used by only "seriously ill patients."

In the 1996 Voter's Handbook, the Official Title and Summary prepared by the Attorney General Dan Lungren, the State of California informed voters that a 'YES' vote on Prop. 215 would exempt patients and defined caregivers from criminal laws. In fact, the very first sentence of the official title and summary clearly states: "Exempts patients and defined caregivers who possess or cultivate marijuana for medical treatment recommended by a physician from criminal laws which otherwise prohibit possession or cultivation of marijuana."CA Secretary of State - Vote96 - Proposition 215

Nowhere in the official Title and Summary does it say anything about an affirmative defense, or any limits or restrictions.

Furthermore, in the official Analysis of Proposition 215 by the Legislative Analyst, the voters were told, "No prescriptions or other record-keeping is required by the measure." In addition, the voters were reminded by the Legislative Analyst that this initiative also covered any other illness for which marijuana provides relief."CA Secretary of State - Vote96 - Analysis of Proposition 215

The Placer County Sheriff's Department had been sent an anonymous letter alleging that the Kubby's had been operating a major grow operation from their residence, and began an investigation. Kubby learned of this, and invited them to inspect the grow room, by passing a note through his own household trash, which the police had begun searching. That note, " ... addressed to law-enforcement personnel, advising them of Steve Kubby's use of medicinal marijuana, maintenance of a garden, possession of no more than 3.5 pounds of pot and his cancer condition," was removed from his trash and entered as evidence by the prosecution.US CA: MMJ: Kubbys Knew Of Impending Arrest

In 1999, Kubby and his wife Michele were arrested and faced trial for growing his own cannabis in his home, though he was entitled to do so legally on behalf of himself and his wife, also a licensed cannabis patient. Calling his arrest the "Scopes monkey trial of medical marijuana," Kubby remained defiant in his support of the Compassionate Use Act. He maintains that the prosecution was politically motivated, implicating then-Attorney General Dan Lungren's office. Lungren had been aggressive in resisting the implementation of Proposition 215, to the point of issuing instructions to peace officers on how to cross-examine cannabis patients so as to undermine their claim of sanction.

In jail for 72 hours after the arrest, Kubby was deprived of medical marijuana and became seriously ill. His blood pressure shot up to dangerous levels. USC Medical Center's Dr. Vincent DeQuattro, who made Kubby's original diagnosis, wrote a letter to the court explaining Steve's condition and warning the judge what could happen if Steve was further deprived of cannabis.

Please consider the consequences of Steve's condition not being controlled. His tumor is manufacturing large quantities of norepinephrine (noradrenaline) and possibly epinephrine (adrenaline). Either compound in minute quantities could kill him instantly by causing sudden cardiac death due to arrhythmia or acute myocardial infarction, or sudden death due to cerebral hemorrhage or cerebral vascular occlusion.

Kubby described their ordeal in his official complaint,

During the entire three days I was incarcerated in the Auburn jail, my tormentors mocked me and my wife as medical-marijuana patients, going out of their way to punish us. Both of us were exposed to freezing conditions, and my wife contracted pneumonia as a result. I spent the entire night shivering and vomiting and could not even get a second blanket for my concrete holding cell. I recall one of my tormentors was a tall, muscular deputy named 'Davis,' who threatened me physically because I was too sick to complete the intake procedure... I also filed a written objection about my left eye going blind, and not receiving even a medical examination.

Michele Kubby won an acquittal on all charges. Steve Kubby's trial, owing to one juror's refusal to acquit, received a mistrial on all the cannabis charges, which were eventually dropped. The jury also voted to convict on a possession charge involving a psilocybin mushroom stem and a few peyote buttons (a felony) found in their house. Kubby was sentenced to 120 days in jail.

== Flight to Canada ==
In 2001, exercising his right to appeal the conviction for peyote possession, Kubby obtained the court's permission to move to Canada with his wife and two children. Kubby and his advisors were concerned that police and prosecutors were determined to prove their theory that he did not really need medical marijuana and would find a way to arrest and incarcerate him. After the Kubby family had been in Canada for a few months Kubby alleged the terms of his appeal were changed without his knowledge or consent by two judges. Kubby claimed that he was wrongly reclassified as a fugitive.

Kubby appealed his fugitive status through the Canadian legal system for five years. Among the arguments made in fighting the appeal was the likelihood that he would be denied access to cannabis in custody and risk death from his illness. This fear was later proved to be well founded as confirmed by the Placer Jail medical staff who found blood in his urine and other evidence of severe hypertensive trauma, which Kubby still suffered from.

Dr. Joseph Michael Connors, an expert in the area of adrenal cancers, testified at the Canadian extradition hearing about Kubby's medical condition:

According to Dr. Connors, Mr. Kubby's tumour releases, in excess quantities, hormones normally found in the adrenal gland that are called catecholamines. Excessive levels of catecholamines in Mr. Kubby's blood cause a range of separate symptomatic problems including paroxysmal headaches, sudden flushing or pallor of the skin, palpitations (rapid and irregular beating of the heart), hypertension (sudden dangerous rise in blood pressure), excessive sweating, sudden abdominal cramps and diarrhea, chest pain, shortness of breath, nausea, sudden severe weakness and anorexia (loss of appetite). If not controlled, Mr. Kubby's symptoms could evolve further to the point where a myocardial infarction (heart attack) or cerebral vascular accident (stroke) could occur.

== Departure from Canada and incarceration in the US ==
After numerous appeals, Kubby was asked to leave Canada under a "conditional Departure Order" within 30 days, which he did. He arrived in San Francisco, California, on Thursday, January 26, 2006, accompanied by his attorney Bill McPike, and was immediately arrested. Although it had been arranged that Kubby would surrender at the Placer Superior Court on Tuesday, 31 January, he was removed from the Alaska Airlines jet on arrival by San Francisco police officers at the request of sheriff's officials in Placer County and taken through secure areas of the airport, bypassing the supporters gathered to greet him.

He was held in San Mateo County Jail in Redwood City, where, according to NORML spokesman Dale Gieringer, he was becoming rapidly ill. He was transported to Placer County Jail Friday afternoon and was arraigned at 1 p.m. in Dept. 13 of Placer County Superior court Tuesday, 31 January. Gieringer reports that Placer County Jail granted Kubby access to Marinol, a THC synthetic which lacks the cannabinoids which have been shown to modulate catecholamine levels. Kubby, with the Marinol, immediately went into cardiac arrest due to the lack of subsequent cannabinoids which modulated the known issues. Michele Kubby reported that the Marinol helped in specific quantities, but that her husband could tell subjectively that it will not be effective in the long run.

Marinol is helping to control the rectal bleeding he was experiencing as well as the blood pressure. Of course Marinol does not contain the [catecholamine-modulating cannabinoids] present in the whole plant, and these have been shown by Dr. Guzman of Spain to have the properties of inhibiting a protein necessary for blood vessel development, which results in the cancer tissue being denied nutrients as well as teaching cancer cells to die.... With Marinol, Steve is only partly protected. Because Marinol uses only the THC active portion of the cannabis plant, his tumors are now free to grow again. This type of tumor is particularly apt to grow into the spinal cord, brain and organs.

She also describes her husband's conditions of confinement,

It seems that [Placer County Jail] has moved him from the infirmary to solitary confinement. He has a cell all to himself and he was freezing. Again they are ignoring his pleas for a blanket and have left him to shiver and chatter in a cold cell. Remember, this is in the foothills of the Western Sierra. It is very cold and the cold is a damp cold. I'm afraid he will be looking at getting pneumonia soon if he is not warmed up... [Placer County Jail] has not taken his blood pressure since he arrived yesterday. Steve must be on a constant monitor in order to gauge the severity of his medical condition. At any time, his blood pressure can skyrocket. Being freezing cold stresses the body which releases more chemicals which worsens the danger.

In January, the San Francisco Board of Supervisors passed a resolution supporting Kubby and calling for his immediate release from jail. On March 6, 2006, Kubby was released early from jail for good behavior. At a March 14 hearing, he was re-sentenced to another 60 days in jail for violating his probation by not returning from Canada in 2001, and began serving the sentence on Wednesday, March 15. Kubby was released on April 5 after serving only 22 days of the 60-day sentence, his time reduced because of jail overcrowding.

In July 2007, the Office of National Drug Control Policy (ONDCP—the drug czar's office) used testimony submitted to Congress to misrepresent the position of Kubby, claiming that he no longer supports medical marijuana.

In written testimony before the House Judiciary Subcommittee on Crime, Terrorism and Homeland Security, Dr. David Murray, ONDCP's Chief Scientist called medical marijuana advocates "modern-day snake oil proponents," sneered at medicines that make patients "feel good," and claimed that laws okaying medical marijuana in a dozen states have led to "abuse, confusion, and crime." Then, to further buttress his argument against the therapeutic use of the herb, he added:

Founding proponents of medical marijuana in the United States have reversed their key positions of support for medical marijuana. Rev. Scott Imler, Co-founder of Prop 215, has lamented the passage of California's medical marijuana law stating that, 'We created Prop. 215 so that patients would not have to deal with black market profiteers. But today it is all about the money. Most of the dispensaries operating in California are little more than dope dealers with store fronts.' Imler also said that medical marijuana has 'turned into a joke.' Steve Kubby, another Co-founder of medical marijuana in California stated in a letter to supporters on April 14, 2006 that 'Marinol is an acceptable, if not ideal, substitute for whole cannabis in treating my otherwise fatal disease.' "My comments about Marinol were based upon my relief that I did not die in jail," he wrote in an email to supporters. "My comment was intended to acknowledge that I did get good blood pressure control with the Marinol and that finding certainly deserves further study. On the other hand, I lost 33 pounds in 62 days while on Marinol, so perhaps I should have used stronger language than 'less than ideal.'"

Kubby suffered from almost constant nausea while on Marinol, he wrote, adding that Murray took his sentence about Marinol out of context. The paragraph from which it was extracted reads as follows: "During that time I experienced excruciating pain, a vicious high blood-pressure crisis, passed blood in my urine and I lost 33 pounds. However, there was also good news. I learned that Marinol is an acceptable, if not ideal, substitute for whole cannabis in treating my otherwise fatal disease. Now I am a free man and I am profoundly grateful to be alive and to have friends and supporters such as you."

While conceding that Marinol can be effective for treatment of hypertension and would allow him to travel briefly without medical marijuana, it does not allow him to have an acceptable quality of life, Kubby said.

"Please help me squash this deceptive and dangerous misrepresentation of my true feeling on this matter by the ONDCP," Kubby wrote. "It just shows how desperate they are that they must mislead people in this way. And just so there is no question about this, let me be clear: Whole cannabis is not only the best medicine for me, it is the only medicine that has kept me alive during the 32 years that I have continued to live, in relatively good health, despite a terminal diagnosis of malignant pheochromocytoma."

== Political positions ==
Kubby was a strong supporter of the United States Constitution and civil liberties. He advocated for legal abortion, gay rights, gun rights, a non-interventionist foreign policy, immediate withdrawal of U.S. troops from the war in Iraq, open borders, and the elimination of federal individual income tax. He was opposed to most governmental regulations, programs, and federal subsidies. He also opposed the war on drugs, Patriot Act and the Military Commissions Act.

During a 2009 interview with a New Jersey newspaper, he criticized the health care plan presented by President Barack Obama, saying: "Obama is ready to spend trillions of dollars to create a government health program. I have a far simpler plan that will genuinely help patients and save them and the government all those trillions of dollars: reschedule marijuana to reflect reality and authorize its use for medical purposes."

== See also ==
- Legal history of cannabis in the United States
- Gonzales v. Raich
- Health issues and the effects of cannabis
- Cannabis legalization in Canada
- Cannabis in California
- Cannabis in the United States
