= Wayne Allyn Root =

American political commentator (born 1961)

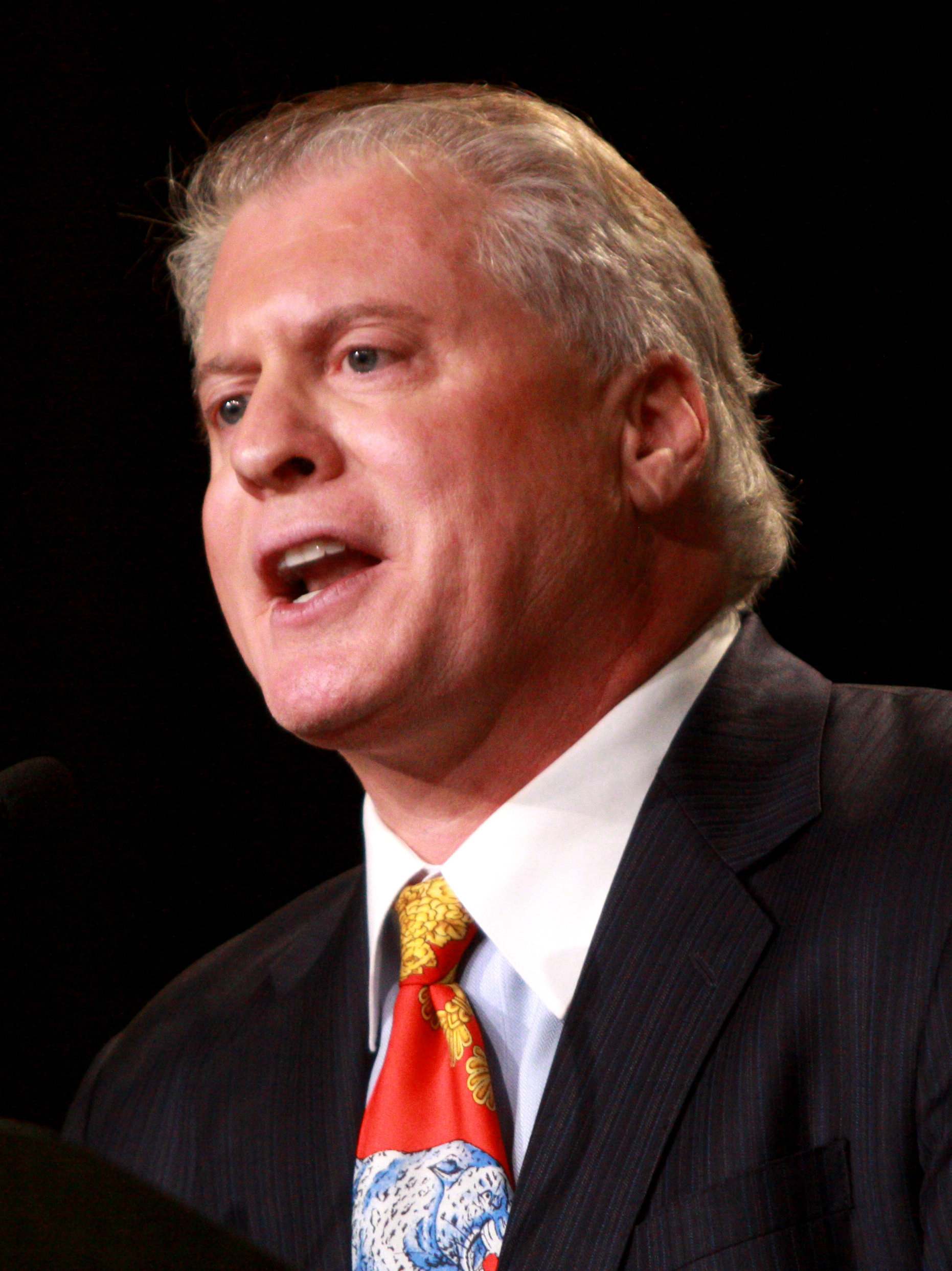
- Root in 2013
- Born: Wayne Allyn Root; July 20, 1961 (age 65); Mount Vernon, New York, U.S.
- Education: Columbia University
- Occupations: Television and radio talk show host, author, political and social commentator
- Employer(s): Newsmax (2010–2020); Breitbart News (2011–present); Townhall (2012–present); Citizens Journal (2013–present); KBET (2016–present); Las Vegas Review-Journal (2016–2020); USA Radio Network (2017–present); The Gateway Pundit (2017–present); Creators Syndicate (2019–present); Las Vegas Tribune (2020)
- Notable credit(s): Fox Business (2009); Fox News (2009, 2012, 2014 and 2016–2017); Ghost Adventures (2008–2013, 2015–2016 and 2018–2019); King of Vegas (2006); Las Vegas Law (2016); Ora TV and RT America (2014–2017)
- Television: Financial News Network (1989–1991); Newsmax TV (2017–2020)
- Political party: Republican (before 2007, 2012–present); Libertarian (2007–2012)
- Movement: Conservative and libertarian
- Spouses: Victoria Creg–Payne (m. 1986; div. 1990) Debra Parks (m. 1991; div. 2017) Cindy Parker (m. 2021)
- Children: 4 (with Parks)
- Website: rootforamerica.com

Wayne Allyn Root (born July 20, 1961) is an American conservative television and radio host, author, activist, conservative political commentator and conspiracy theorist. He is the host of The ROOT Reaction and America's Top Ten Countdown with Wayne Allyn Root, both on Real America's Voice and Lindell TV. President Trump has been a guest on Root's TV and radio shows 16 times, including a face-to-face TV interview in October 2024. Root is also the host of radio program Wayne Allyn Root: Raw & Unfiltered on AM 670 in Las Vegas, and nationally syndicated on the Talk Media Network, formerly on Newsmax TV. Root was an opinion columnist for the Las Vegas Review-Journal. His newspaper columns are currently nationally syndicated on Sundays by Creators Syndicate.

Root was the vice presidential nominee for the Libertarian Party in the 2008 presidential election. In 2012, he left the Libertarian Party, rejoined the Republican Party, and endorsed and voted for Mitt Romney and Donald Trump. He has remained a staunch supporter of Trump.

Root is the CEO of the publicly traded penny stock company VegasWinners.com (WNRS symbol), who recently partnered with the MGM Hotel's BetMGM.

== Early life and education ==
Root attended the Thornton-Donovan School in New Rochelle, New York and was a member of the class of 1983 at Columbia University, studying pre-law and political science.

In June 2016, Root described himself as a "Jew turned Evangelical Christian". As of November 2016, Root described himself as Jewish, and says he considers Donald Trump to be the first Jewish president, in the same sense that Bill Clinton was often called the "first black president".

== Career ==
Root worked for WNBC radio (now WFAN) in the early 1980s. From 1989 to 1991, he worked with the Financial News Network before its subsumption into CNBC.

Root was founder and chairman of Winning Edge International Inc. In the 2000s, he hosted Wayne Allyn Root's Winning Edge, a television show which promoted Root's sports handicapping operation.

Root co-hosted King of Vegas on Spike TV. He produced Ghost Adventures on the Travel Channel.

== Politics ==
Root had been a longtime Republican Party member and supporter who self-identified as a Libertarian Republican. He ran for a seat on the Westchester County Board of Legislators in 1983. In 2007, Root ended his association with the Republican Party and joined the Libertarian Party. Root's book outlining his libertarian views, The Conscience of a Libertarian, was published in 2009.

=== 2008 presidential campaign ===
On May 4, 2007, Root declared his candidacy for the Libertarian Party's 2008 presidential nomination. On May 25, 2008, Root advanced to the fifth ballot of the Libertarian Party presidential nomination vote at the 2008 Libertarian National Convention before being eliminated and endorsing Bob Barr, who became the party's presidential nominee. Root then became the Libertarian Party vice presidential nominee, securing the nod in the third round of voting for that nomination.

Though in the same graduating class as Barack Obama at Columbia University, Root has stated on a number of occasions that he has no recollection of having met or seen Obama at Columbia. He has claimed that this alleged lack of eyewitnesses to Obama's presence at Columbia is highly "suspicious" and should be "a cause for great concern".

In 2010, Root ran for the position of chair of the Libertarian National Committee of the Libertarian Party. He was defeated by Mark Hinkle by a vote of 228–281 in the third round. He subsequently succeeded in being elected to the Libertarian National Committee as an at-large member. At the 2012 Libertarian National Convention, Root again was elected to the Libertarian National Committee as an At-Large Member, despite being seen by some LP members as being part of the "top-down faction". The party's 2012 presidential candidate and former Republican New Mexico Governor Gary Johnson endorsed Root.

=== Return to the Republican Party ===
In September 2012, Root resigned all Libertarian Party positions, re-joined the Republican Party and endorsed Mitt Romney in the 2012 presidential election. He predicted Romney would win the election against incumbent president Barack Obama, citing, among other factors, that the "Enthusiasm Factor" for Romney was "huge".

Root had announced that he intended to run as a Republican candidate for the U.S. Senate in Nevada in 2016, for the seat held by retiring Democratic Senator Harry Reid. However, he did not run. He supported and voted for Republican nominee Donald Trump in the 2016 presidential election and 2020 presidential election.

Root was the opening speaker for Trump's rally in Las Vegas in late October 2016 during the presidential campaign. At the rally, Root suggested that he wished ill upon Hillary Clinton and Huma Abedin, hoping they met the same ending as Thelma & Louise. The lead characters in the film take their own lives by driving off a cliff. In his speech, Root said "Trump warriors" armed with "pitchforks, jack hammers and blow torches" would violently take over Washington D.C.: "We're coming to tear it down. We're coming to rip it up. We're coming to kick your ass. And we're coming to put you in prison", he said referring to a fantasy he had about Clinton and Abedin. Kellyanne Conway, Trump's campaign manager, later told CNN that Root's "conduct is completely unacceptable and does not reflect our campaign or our candidate".

In August 2019, Root praised President Trump. Following Trump's assertion that Jews voting for the Democrats show "either a total lack of knowledge or great disloyalty", a comment which was rejected by his critics who said he was following an antisemitic canard, Root countered the claim. Root said that "Trump is the greatest President for Jews and for Israel in the history of the world, not just America, he is the best President for Israel in the history of the world...and the Jewish people in Israel love him like he's the King of Israel. They love him like he is the second coming of God." Later, President Donald Trump thanked Root on Twitter for "the very nice words" and shared what was said about him.

In October 2019, while speaking at a pro-Trump conference in Miami, Florida at the Trump National Doral Miami, Root reportedly boasted about a time in his childhood when, as one of the few white students at a predominantly black high school, he knocked one classmate unconscious and shattered another kid's teeth. "My buddies and I were high-fiving and laughing," Root reportedly said during his speech. "Man, it was funny." He reportedly went on to say that "you've got to be a natural-born killer" to win in politics.

=== Criticism and controversies ===
==== Promotion of conspiracy theories and falsehoods ====
Root is known for spreading conspiracy theories and false information.

Root was a leading proponent of the conspiracy theory that President Barack Obama was not born in the United States. Root falsely claimed that Obama was not a student at Columbia University. He later stated in a 2012 interview with Sean Hannity that he believed Obama was a "foreign exchange student" there. He has repeatedly described Obama as a "Marxist, anti-American, anti-Israel, globalist, middle class-hating, Muslim sympathizer". In 2017, he claimed that Obama was gay, called him "Bathhouse Barry" and said that he had info from Obama's "friends in Chicago" about his "sordid past". In 2014, he described Obama as a "Manchurian candidate", possibly hired by the Bilderberg Group to destroy the United States and "kill all of us".

Root promoted conspiracy theories around the murder of Seth Rich, and at various times suggested that Debbie Wasserman Schultz, Hillary Clinton, Donna Brazile, Bill Clinton, Eric Schneiderman and John Podesta were involved in the murder.

During the white supremacist Unite the Right rally, Root falsely claimed that blaming white supremacist James Alex Fields Jr. for killing Heather Heyer was "such B.S. Probably paid actors & infiltrators hired by Soros. No conservative I've ever met commits violence. EVER."

On the night of the 2017 Las Vegas shooting, in which 58 people were shot and killed by Stephen Paddock (including himself) and 2 of them shot by Paddock later died of their injuries in 2019 and 2020 respectively, Root tweeted: "Clearly coordinated Muslim terror attack." Police later determined only one shooter—a non-religious American—was involved.

In 2018, Root argued that Special Counsel Robert Mueller's investigation into Russian interference in the 2016 election is motivated by "penis envy", because "Mueller's is smaller than Trump's".

On February 6, 2021, Twitter permanently suspended Root's account for "violating Twitter rules".

In July 2022, Root debated journalist Isaac Saul at Freedom Fest in Las Vegas, arguing that the 2020 United States presidential election was stolen and that Donald Trump should run for president again in 2024. During the debate, Root promoted, among other ideas, that COVID-19 vaccine injuries were being concealed by the government; that millions of illegal immigrants were voting in US elections and tipping them in favor of Democrats; that multiple states coordinated to stop counting on election night 2020 until more illegitimate ballots could be found to favor the election of Democrat Joe Biden; and that Las Vegas Culinary Union tactics are the only reason Democrats win elections in Nevada, which he believes to be otherwise almost entirely Republican.

==== Legal problems ====
On March 19–21, 2020, Chief Health Care Bureau Lisa Landau and New York Attorney General Letitia James ordered Root to stop advertising My Doctor Suggests, LLC on KBET and USA Radio Network citing violations of state laws on deceptive acts and practices.

On April 29, 2020, Gordon Pedersen of My Doctor Suggests LLC and GP Silver LLC was ordered by the United States Department of Justice (DOJ) under the Trump administration to permanently stop advertising and selling all of these products out there. A hearing on the government's request for a preliminary injunction was set for May 12, 2020. The products were discontinued and the website was permanently shut down as a result.

== Bibliography ==
- Betting to Win on Sports (as Wayne Alan Root, with Wilbur Cross). Bantam. 1989. ISBN 978-0-553-34789-0.
- The Joy of Failure!: How to Turn Failure, Rejection, and Pain into Extraordinary Success. Summit Publishing Group. 1997. ISBN 978-1-56530-206-8.
- The Zen of Gambling: The Ultimate Guide to Risking It All and Winning at Life (with Paul Pease). Tarcher. 2004. ISBN 978-1-58542-402-3.
- Millionaire Republican. Tarcher. 2005. ISBN 978-1-58542-512-9.
- The King of Vegas' Guide to Gambling: How to Win Big at Poker, Casino Gambling & Life!The Zen of Gambling updated. Tarcher. 2006. ISBN 978-1-58542-529-7.
- The Conscience of a Libertarian: Empowering the Citizen Revolution with God, Guns, Gold & Tax Cuts. Wiley. 2009. ISBN 978-0-470-45265-3.
- The Ultimate Obama Survival Guide: How to Survive, Thrive, and Prosper During Obamageddon. Regnery Publishing. 2013. ISBN 978-1621570912.
- The Murder of the Middle Class. Regnery Publishing. 2014. ISBN 978-1621572213.
- Angry White Male – How the Donald Trump Phenomenon is Changing America—and What We Can All Do to Save the Middle Class. Skyhorse Publishing. August 2016. ISBN 978-1510718425.

Party political offices
Preceded by Richard Campagna	Libertarian nominee for Vice President of the United States; 2008	Succeeded by Jim Gray
