= List of candidates in the 2004 United States presidential election =

Third-party and independent candidates for the 2004 United States presidential election
- November 2, 2004
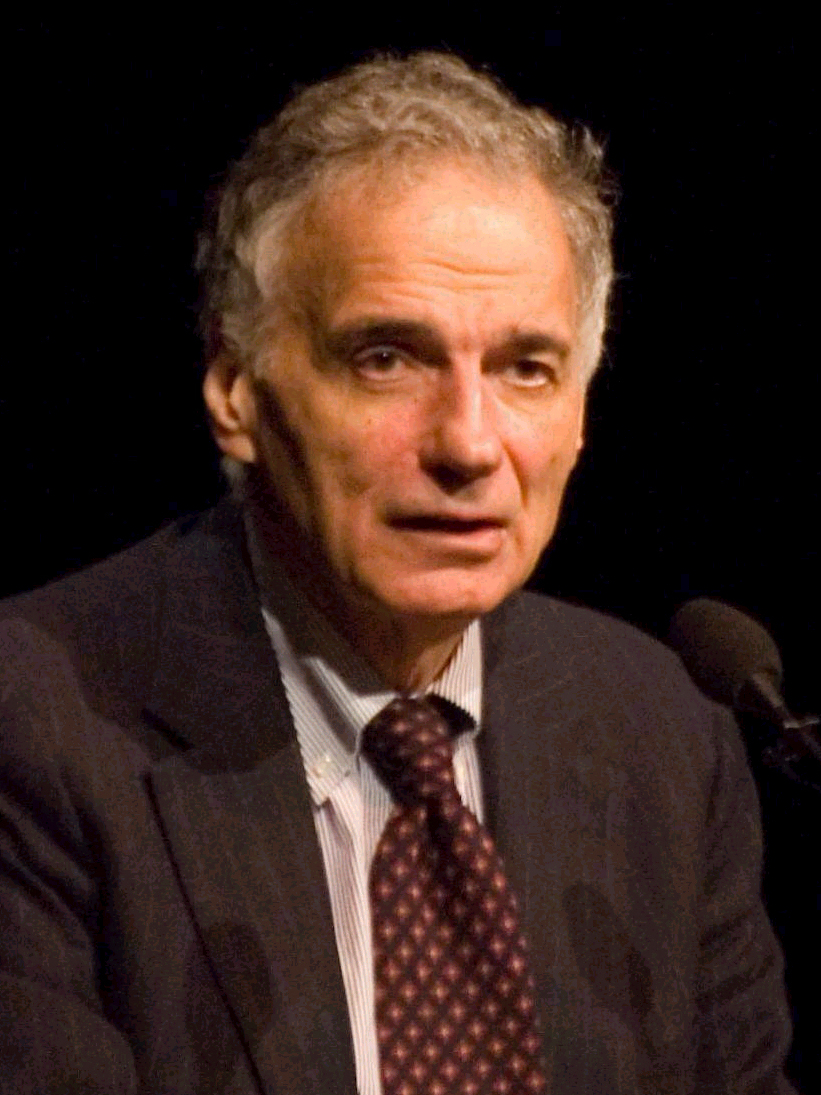

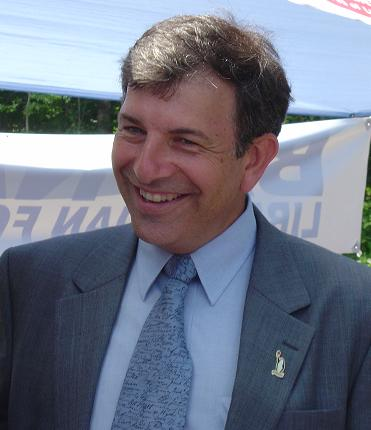

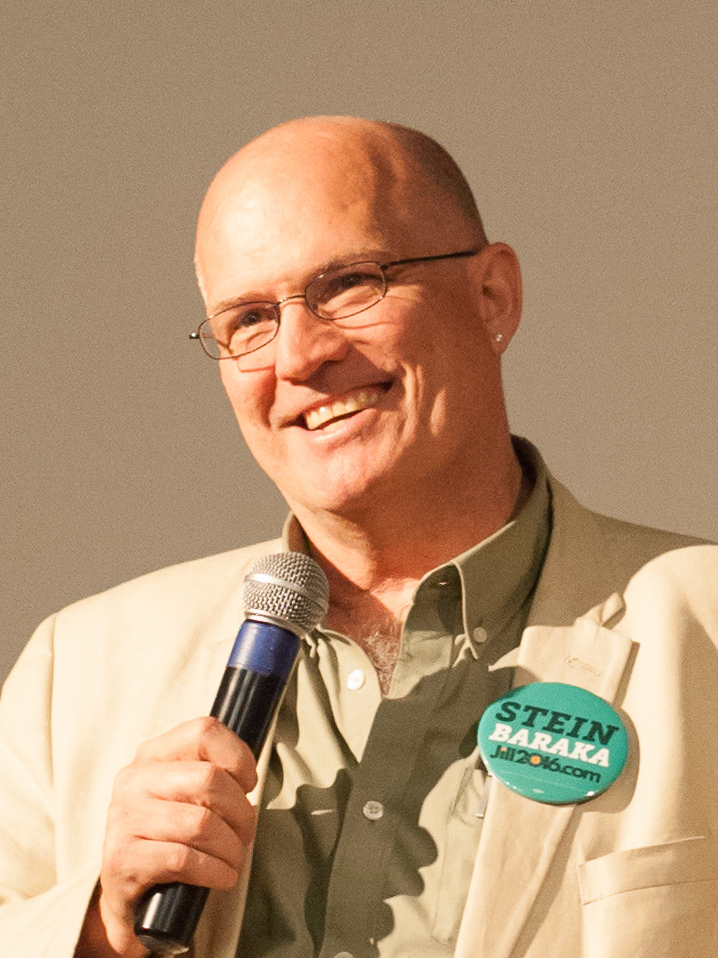

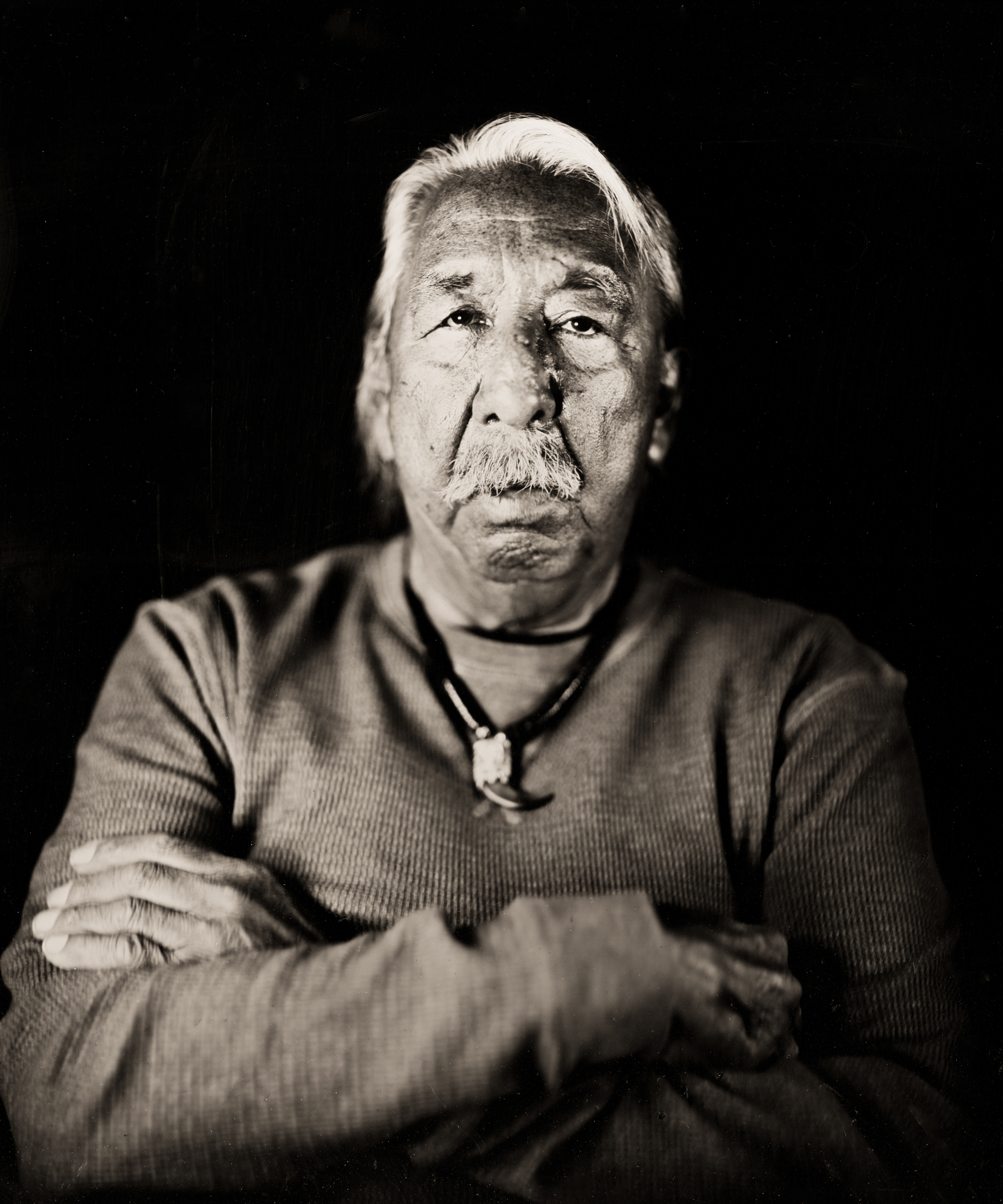

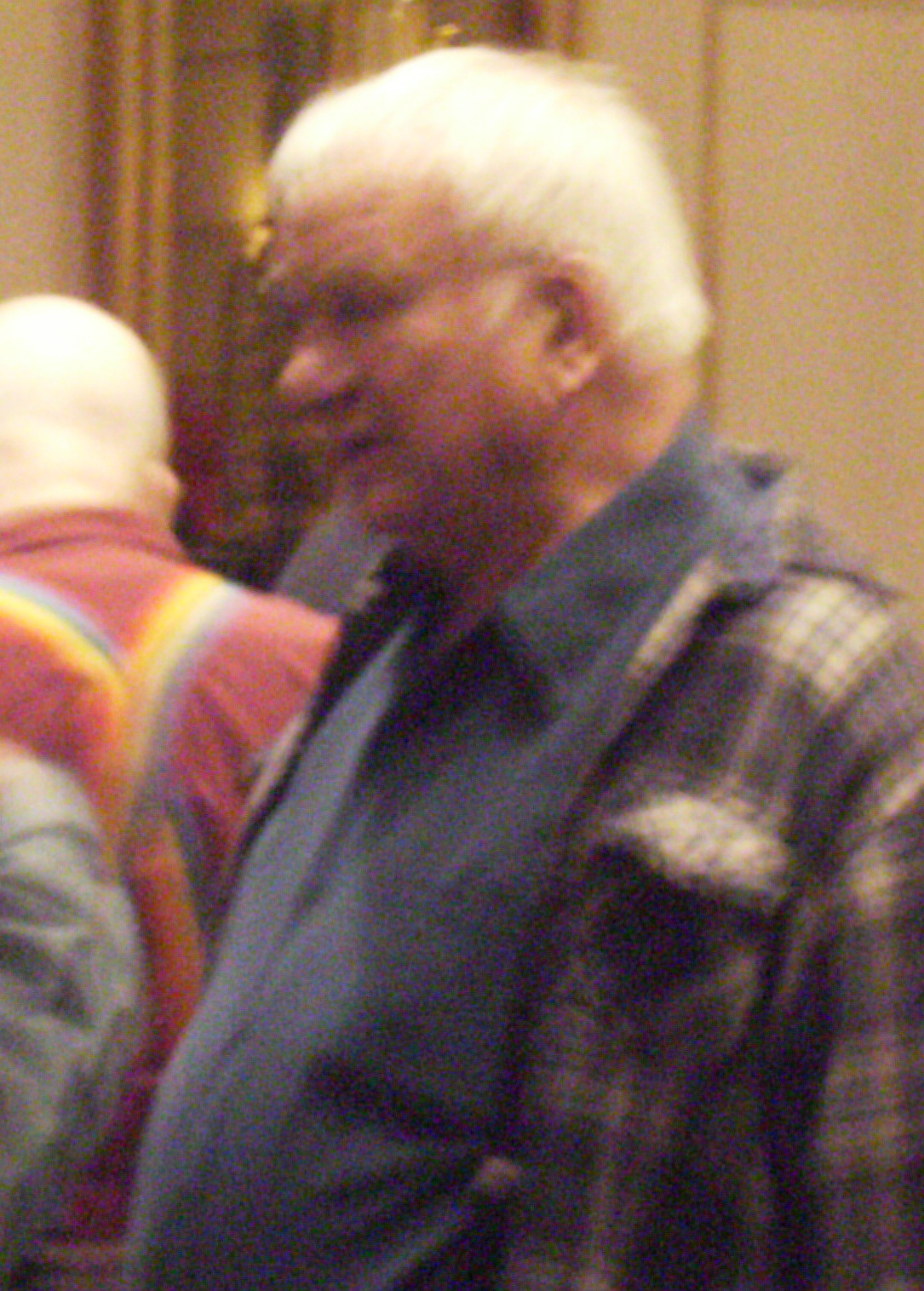
Nominee	Ralph Nader	Michael Badnarik	Michael Peroutka
Party	Reform	Libertarian	Constitution
Home state	Connecticut	Texas	Maryland
Running mate	Peter Camejo	Richard Campagna	Chuck Baldwin
Popular vote	465,650	397,265	143,630
Percentage	0.38%	0.32%	0.12%
Nominee	David Cobb	Leonard Peltier	Walt Brown
Party	Green	Peace and Freedom	Socialist
Home state	Texas	Pennsylvania	Oregon
Running mate	Pat LaMarche	Janice Jordan	Mary Alice Herbert
Popular vote	119,859	27,607	10,837
Percentage	0.10%	0.02%	0.01%
Nominee	Róger Calero	Thomas Harens
Party	Socialist Workers	Christian Freedom
Home state	New York	Minnesota
Running mate	Arrin Hawkins	Jennifer Ryan
Popular vote	3,689	2,387
Percentage	0.01%	0.002%

This article contains lists of official third party or independent candidates associated with the 2004 United States presidential election.

Third party is a term commonly used in the United States to refer to political parties other than the two major parties, the Democratic Party and Republican Party. The term is used as innumerate shorthand for all such parties, or sometimes only the largest of them.

An independent candidate is one who runs for office with no formal party affiliation.

Candidates who received, or ran for, the presidential nomination of a political party other than that of the two major parties in the 2004 presidential election, as well those who ran as independents, are listed below.

== Party nominees ==
All candidates in the table below were on the ballot in multiple states. Those who were on the ballot in enough states to win a majority in the U.S. Electoral College are marked in bold. Candidates who were on the ballot in no more than one state are listed in the next section.

Presidential candidate	Running mate	Party
Gene Amondson	Leroy Pletten	Prohibition
**Michael Badnarik**	Richard Campagna	Libertarian
Walt Brown	Mary Alice Herbert	Socialist
Róger Calero	Arrin Hawkins	Socialist Workers
**David Cobb**	Pat LaMarche	Green
Earl F. Dodge	Howard Lydick	Prohibition
**Ralph Nader**	Peter Camejo	Independent, Reform
John Parker	Teresa Gutierrez	Workers World
**Michael Peroutka**	Chuck Baldwin	Constitution
Bill Van Auken	Jim Lawrence	Socialist Equality

== Ballot access ==
The two major parties in the United States are the Democratic and the Republican parties, which are on the ballot in all fifty states and the District of Columbia.

The table below shows which third-party candidates were able to gain ballot access in each state. In some states, these candidates were on the ballot as independents, or on the ballot lines of different parties (for example, in Michigan the Socialist Party USA candidate received the Natural Law Party's ballot line.)

The Socialist Workers Party's official ticket could not be listed on the ballot in some states because Calero and Hawkins were both ineligible to be president, as Calero was not a native-born citizen and Hawkins was too young. In such states the party used their 2000 ticket of James Harris and Margaret Trowe (JH).

The Prohibition Party suffered a schism in 2003. Long-time presidential candidate Earl Dodge was the nominee of one faction, while Gene Amondson was the nominee of the other. Both factions were on the ballot in Colorado, with only Amondson on the ballot in Louisiana.

Candidates who had enough potential electoral votes to win the presidency

	Electoral Votes	Libertarian (Badnarik)	Green (Cobb)	Nader	Constitution (Peroutka)
States	**51**	**49** (50)	**25** (43)	**35** (48)	**34** (42)
Electoral votes (EV)	**538**	**527** (531)	**267** (479)	**278** (507)	**341** (430)
Percent of EV	**100%**	**97.9%** (98.7%)	**49.6%** (89%)	**51.7%** (94.2%)	**63.3%** (79.9%)
Alabama	9		**(write-in)**		**(write-in)**
Alaska	3				**(write-in)**
Arizona	10		**(write-in)**	**(write-in)**	
Arkansas	6				
California	55			**(write-in)**	
Colorado	9				
Connecticut	7				
Delaware	3				
Florida	27				
Georgia	15		**(write-in)**	**(write-in)**	**(write-in)**
Hawaii	4				
Idaho	4		**(write-in)**	**(write-in)**	
Illinois	21		**(write-in)**	**(write-in)**	**(write-in)**
Indiana	11			**(write-in)**	**(write-in)**
Iowa	7				
Kansas	6		**(write-in)**		
Kentucky	8				
Louisiana	9				
Maine	4				
Maryland	10				
Massachusetts	12			**(write-in)**	
Michigan	17				
Minnesota	10				
Mississippi	6				
Missouri	11			**(write-in)**	
Montana	3				
Nebraska	5				
Nevada	5				
New Hampshire	4	**(write-in)**	**(write-in)**		**(write-in)**
New Jersey	15				
New Mexico	5				
New York	31		**(write-in)**		
North Carolina	15		**(write-in)**	**(write-in)**	
North Dakota	3				
Ohio	20		**(write-in)**		
Oklahoma	7				
Oregon	7			**(write-in)**	
Pennsylvania	21			**(write-in)**	
Rhode Island	4				
South Carolina	8				
South Dakota	3				
Tennessee	11		**(write-in)**		
Texas	34		**(write-in)**	**(write-in)**	**(write-in)**
Utah	5		**(write-in)**		
Vermont	3		**(write-in)**		**(write-in)**
Virginia	13		**(write-in)**	**(write-in)**	
Washington	11				
West Virginia	5		**(write-in)**		
Wisconsin	10				**(write-in)**
Wyoming	3		**(write-in)**		
District of Columbia	3		**(write-in)**		

Other third-party candidates

	Electoral Votes	Prohibition (Amondson)	Socialist (Brown)	Socialist Workers (Calero)	Workers World (Parker)	Socialist Equality (Van Auken)
States	**51**	**2**	**8** (19)	**14** (17)	**3** (4)	**5** (8)
EV	**538**	**18**	**98** (218)	**151** (247)	**18** (73)	**52** (93)
Percent of EV	**100%**	**3.3%**	**18.2%** (40.5%)	**28%** (45.9%)	**3.3%** (13.6%)	**9.6%** (17.3%)
Alabama	9					
Alaska	3					
Arizona	10					
Arkansas	6					
California	55			**(write-in)**	**(write-in)**	
Colorado	9	(also Dodge)		**(JH)**		
Connecticut	7					
Delaware	3					
Florida	27			**(JH)**		
Georgia	15					
Hawaii	4					
Idaho	4		**(write-in)**			
Illinois	21			**(write-in)**		
Indiana	11		**(write-in)**			
Iowa	7			**(JH)**		
Kansas	6		**(write-in)**			**(write-in)**
Kentucky	8		**(write-in)**			
Louisiana	9			**(JH)**		
Maine	4					**(write-in)**
Maryland	10					
Massachusetts	12					
Michigan	17					
Minnesota	10		**(write-in)**			
Mississippi	6			**(JH)**		
Missouri	11					
Montana	3		**(write-in)**			
Nebraska	5					
Nevada	5					
New Hampshire	4					
New Jersey	15					
New Mexico	5					
New York	31					**(write-in)**
North Carolina	15		**(write-in)**			
North Dakota	3					
Ohio	20			**(write-in)**		
Oklahoma	7					
Oregon	7					
Pennsylvania	21					
Rhode Island	4					
South Carolina	8					
South Dakota	3					
Tennessee	11		**(write-in)**			
Texas	34		**(write-in)**			
Utah	5		**(write-in)**	**(JH)**		
Vermont	3					
Virginia	13		**(write-in)**			
Washington	11			**(JH)**		
West Virginia	5					
Wisconsin	10			**(JH)**		
Wyoming	3					
District of Columbia	3			**(JH)**		

Other candidates

The tickets below were on the ballot in no more than one state. Those who appeared on a single state's ballot are in bold, all others were write-in candidates. Those without party labels were independents. Some did not have vice-presidential candidates.

- A. J. Albritton (American Republican Party—Mississippi)
- Sterling Allan (Providential Party—Utah)
- **Stanford E. "Andy" Andress**/**Irene M. Deasy** (Colorado)
- Lawson M. Bone (Tennessee)
- Kenneth M. Bonnell (Mississippi)
- Robert A. Boyle II (Maryland)
- Harry Braun (Arizona)
- Theodis "Ted" Brown Sr. (Missouri)
- Fred Cook (Georgia)
- Eric J. Davis (Michigan)
- Robert DiGiulio (Children's Party—Vermont)
- Bob Dorn (Washington)
- Lonnie D. Frank (California)
- Ronald "John Galt Jr." Gascon (Pennsylvania)
- Jack Grimes (United Fascist Union—Pennsylvania)
- Michael Halpin (New York)
- **Thomas Harens**/**Jennifer Ryan** (Christian Freedom Party—Minnesota)
- Larry D. Hines (Texas)
- Georgia Hough (Georgia)
- **Charles Jay**/**Marilyn Chambers** (Personal Choice—Utah)
- Keith Judd (Massachusetts)
- Darren E. Karr (Party X—Oregon)
- Samuel Keegan (Rhode Island)
- John Joseph Kennedy (Georgia)
- **Tom Laughlin**
- Joseph Martyniuk Jr. (Illinois)
- David Mevis (Mississippi)
- Muadin (E-Democratic Party—Massachusetts)
- **Leonard Peltier**/**Janice Jordan** (Peace and Freedom—California)
- Jeffrey Peters (We the People Party—New Hampshire)
- Andrew M. Rotramel (Texas)
- Joseph "Average Joe" Schriner (Ohio)
- Dennis P. Slatton (United America Party—North Carolina)
- Dan Snow (Texas)
- Brian B. Springfield (Virginia)
- Diane Templin (American Party—California)
- Lawrence Rey Topham (Utah)
- Lemuel Tucker (Michigan)
- Da Vid (Light Party—California)
- Tom Wells (Family Values Party—Florida)
- A. J. Wildman (Virginia)

Although Guam has no votes in the Electoral College, they have held a straw poll for their presidential preferences since 1980. In 2004, the results were Bush 21,490 (64.1%), Kerry 11,781 (35.1%), Nader 196 (0.58%) and Badnarik 67 (0.2%).

== Primary and convention candidates ==
- Blake Ashby (Republican)
- Katherine Bateman (Democratic)
- Sheila Bilyeu (Green)
- Dick Bosa (Republican)
- Carol Moseley Braun (Democratic)
- Harry Braun (Democratic)
- John Buchanan (Republican)
- Michael Callis (Republican)
- Peter Camejo (Green)
- Willie Carter (Democratic)
- Jeanne Chebib (Democratic)
- Eric Chester (Socialist)
- Wesley Clark (Democratic)
- Randy Crow (Democratic)
- Howard Dean (Democratic)
- Jeffrey Diket (Libertarian)
- Gerry Dokka (Democratic)
- Don Doumakes (Socialist)
- John Edwards (Democratic)
- John A. Estrada (Democratic)
- Richard Gephardt (Democratic)
- Mildred Glover (Democratic)
- Paul Glover (Green)
- George Gostigian (Republican)
- Bob Graham (Democratic)
- Robert Haines (Republican)
- Vincent Hamm (Democratic)
- Mark Harnes (Republican)
- Mildred Howard (Republican)
- Caroline Killeen (Democratic)
- Dennis Kucinich (Democratic)
- Lyndon LaRouche (Democratic)
- Tom Laughlin (Republican)
- Randy Lee (Democratic)
- Joe Lieberman (Democratic)
- Robert Linnell (Democratic)
- Bill McGaughey (Democratic)
- Kent Mesplay (Green)
- Carol Miller (Green)
- Gary Nolan (Libertarian)
- Cornelius O'Connor (Republican)
- Edward O'Donnell (Democratic)
- Fern Penna (Democratic)
- Rubén Pérez (Libertarian)
- John Rigazio (Republican)
- Aaron Russo (Libertarian)
- Lorna Salzman (Green)
- Al Sharpton (Democratic)
- Vermin Supreme (Democratic)
- Leonard Talbow (Democratic)
- Jim Taylor. (Republican)
- Florence Walker (Democratic)
- Lisa Weltman (Socialist)
- Lucian Wojciechowski (Democratic)
- Bill Wyatt (Republican)

== See also ==
- List of candidates in the 2008 United States presidential election
- 2004 Green National Convention
- 2004 Libertarian National Convention
- 2004 Reform National Convention
