= 2004 Libertarian Party presidential primaries =

← 2000	February 3, 2004–May 11, 2004	2008 →

Non-binding preferential vote

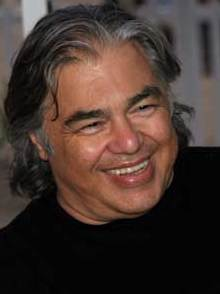

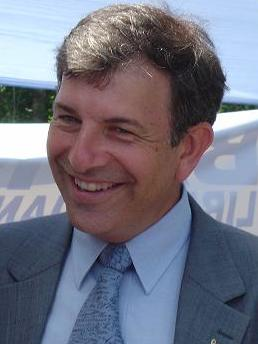
Candidate	Gary Nolan	Aaron Russo	Michael Badnarik (Note: The primaries were non-binding. Despite not receiving a plurality of the popular vote, Badnarik was able to secure a majority of delegate votes at the convention, and thus the nomination.)
Contests won	5	0	0
Popular vote	14,683	4,964	4,879
Percentage	55.0%	18.6%	18.3%
First place by popular vote
Gary Nolan (5)
No contest
Previous Libertarian nominee
Harry Browne
Libertarian nominee
Michael Badnarik

The 2004 Libertarian Party presidential primaries allowed voters to indicate non-binding preferences for the Libertarian Party's presidential candidate. These differed from the Republican or Democratic presidential primaries and caucuses in that they did not appoint delegates to represent a candidate at the party's convention to select the party's nominee for the United States presidential election. The party's nominee for the 2004 presidential election was chosen directly by registered delegates at the 2004 Libertarian National Convention, which ran from May 28 to 31, 2004. The delegates nominated Michael Badnarik for president and Richard Campagna for vice president.

Five primaries were held. A total of 26,701 votes were cast in these primaries.

== Candidates ==
Candidate	Profession	Campaign	On primary ballot					Popular vote
Candidate	Profession	Campaign	MO	WI	CA	MA	NE	Popular vote
Gary Nolan	Talk radio host		Yes	Yes	Yes	Yes	Yes	14,683
Aaron Russo	Entertainment businessman, film producer and director, and political activist		No	No	Yes	Yes	No	4,964
Michael Badnarik	Software engineer		No	Yes	Yes	Yes	Yes	4,879
Jeffrey Diket			Yes	No	No	Yes	No	223
Ruben Perez	2002 candidate for Texas Railroad Commission		Yes	No	No	No	Yes	219
Alternate ballot options:
Uncommitted/No preference/Uninstructed delegation	N/A		Yes	Yes	No	Yes	No	1,115

== Primaries and caucuses ==
National totals
Candidate	Votes	%	First-place primary/caucus finishes
Gary Nolan	14,683	54.99%	5
Aaron Russo	4964	18.59%	—
Michael Badnarik	4,879%	18.27	—
Uncommitted/uninstructed	885	3.31%	—
Jeffery Diket	223	0.84%	—
Ruben Perez	219	0.82%	—
Scattered write-ins	214	0.80%	—

=== Missouri primary ===
In the Wisconsin primary on February 3, the Libertarian Party had a state-run primary held alongside the Democratic, Republican primaries.

Missouri Libertarian presidential primary, February 3, 2004
Candidate	Votes	Percentage
Gary Nolan	899	45.7
Uncommitted	746	37.9
N. Ruben Perez	167	8.5
Jeffrey Diket	155	7.9
Total	1,967	100

=== Wisconsin primary ===
In the Wisconsin primary on February 17, the Libertarian Party had a state-run primary held alongside the Democratic, Republican primaries.

Wisconsin Libertarian presidential primary, February 17, 2004
Candidate	Votes	Percentage
Gary Nolan	1,491	43.2
Michael Badnarik	1,416	41.0
Uninstructed delegation	139	4.0
Total	3,450	100

=== California primary ===
Type: Semi-Closed

In the California primary on March 2, the Libertarian Party had a state-run primary held alongside those for the Republicans, Democrats, the Green Party, and the Peace and Freedom Party.

California Libertarian presidential primary, March 2, 2004
Candidate	Votes	Percentage
Gary Nolan	11,885	59.2
Aaron Russo	4,858	24.2
Michael Badnarik	3,335	16.6
Total	20,078	100

=== Massachusetts primary ===
In the Massachusetts primary on March 2, the Libertarian Party had a state-run primary held alongside the Democratic, Republican, and Green primaries.

Massachusetts Libertarian presidential primary, March 2, 2004
Candidate	Votes	Percentage
Gary Nolan	292	28.0
No preference	230	22.0
Aaron Russo	106	10.2
Michael Badnarik	82	7.9
Jeffrey Diket	68	6.5
Ruben Perez	52	5.0
Write-ins	214	20.5
Total	1,044	100

=== Nebraska primary ===
In the Nebraska primary on May 11, the Libertarian Party had a state-run primary held alongside the Democratic and Republican primaries.

Missouri Libertarian presidential primary, May 11, 2004
Candidate	Votes	Percentage
Gary Nolan	116	71.6
Michael Badnarik	46	28.4
Total	162	100

== See also ==
Presidential primaries

- 2004 Democratic Party presidential primaries
- 2004 Green Party presidential primaries
- 2004 Republican Party presidential primaries

National Conventions

- 2008 Constitution Party National Convention
- 2004 Libertarian National Convention
- 2004 Green National Convention
- 2004 Democratic National Convention
- 2004 Republican National Convention
