= 2004 Reform National Convention =

American political party nomination convention

- 2004 presidential election
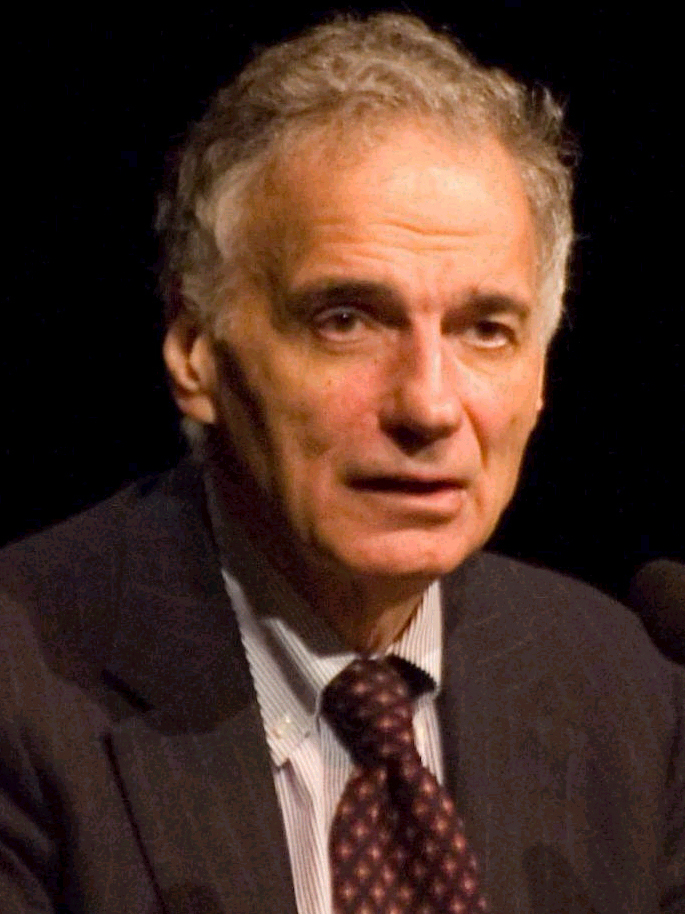
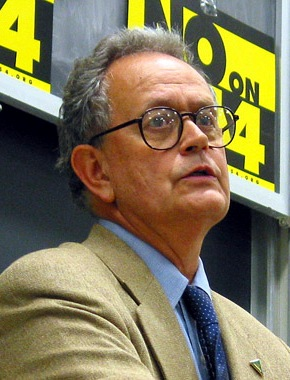
- Nominees (Nader and Camejo)

Convention
- Date(s): May 10–11, 2004 (nomination meeting); Aug 27–28, 2004 (convention)
- City: teleconference (nomination meeting); Irving, Texas (convention)
- Venue: Courtyard Marriott Irving (convention)

Candidates
- Presidential nominee: Ralph Nader of Connecticut
- Vice-presidential nominee: Peter Camejo

2004 Reform National Convention consisted of a nomination meeting held via teleconference May 10–11 2004, and a subsequent convention held at the Courtyard Marriott in Irving, Texas August 27–28, 2004. The nomination meeting saw the party support the candidacy of Ralph Nader, who was already running as an independent candidate.

== Background ==
For the 2004 United States presidential election, the Reform Party had automatic ballot access in seven states: Florida, Michigan (both of which were expected to be competitive battleground states); as well as Colorado, Kansas, Mississippi, Montana, and South Carolina (all of which were anticipated to be safely Republican-leaning "red states").

Ralph Nader, who had run as the nominee of the Green Party in both his 1996 and 2000 presidential campaigns, opted to instead run his 2004 campaign as an independent candidate. Ahead of the Reform Party's nomination meeting, he had yet to obtain ballot access in any states.

== Nomination meeting ==
The party met by teleconference May 10 and May 11, 2004; ultimately voting to endorse Nader's campaign.

Six candidates were put forth as possible presidential nominees:

- John Buchanan, journalist and author
- Richard Green, talk show host and newspaper editor
- Ralph Nader, consumer advocate
- Michael Peroutka, attorney and Constitution Party nominee
- Joe Turner, healthcare advocate and attorney
- Ted Weill, industrialist, party member, and 1996 Senate candidate in Mississippi

All six contenders spoke on the first night of the teleconference. The conference voted to endorse Nader's independent candidacy.

Pending Nader's acceptance of their nomination, his campaign would able to utilize their ballot line in the seven states in which the party had automatic ballot access for the 2004 presidential election. After the nomination meeting, Nader's campaign spokesman declared that while Nader would remain an independent candidate, he would weigh accepting the Reform Party's ballot line in some or all of the seven states.

At the time of the Reform nomination meeting, Nader had not yet selected a vice presidential running mate for his campaign. In June, shortly before the Green National Convention (whose endorsement for president Nader was similarly vying for), Nader announced that he had selected Peter Camejo to be his running mate.

== Convention ==
The party held an in-person convention at the Courtyard Marriott in Irving, Texas on August 27 and 28. Nader delivered a speech on the second day of the convention.
