= John Buchanan (American politician) =

American freelance journalist and fringe political candidate

John Howard Buchanan is a freelance journalist, and was a fringe Republican candidate in the 2004 Presidential election. Buchanan was previously based in Florida and lives in rural Georgia.

Buchanan discovered documents related to Union Banking Corporation's business dealings with Fritz Thyssen, the Nazi industrialist who broke with the Nazis after Kristallnacht in 1938 and fled to Switzerland during World War II; together with Stacy Michael, Buchanan wrote an article about it for the New Hampshire Gazette, accusing one of the directors of the bank, Prescott Bush, of dealing with the Nazis.

He e-mailed a number of threats against journalists and media outlets who refused to publish his theories, saying that he would expose the journalists as "traitors to the truth." Buchanan was arrested and charged with aggravated stalking in Miami, Florida, over a dispute of how best to publicize his theories, but the charges were dropped in 2004.

During his presidential campaign, he often referred to himself as "the 9/11 Truth Candidate". He also opposed the 2003 Iraq war. A United Press International reporter called his campaign "unhinged." With 836 votes, Buchanan finished in eighth in the 2004 New Hampshire primary, in which incumbent George W. Bush was not seriously contested.

Buchanan also mulled a 2004 run with the Reform Party. The major contenders for the nomination were Ted Weill and Ralph Nader, the latter of whom was ultimately chosen.

Buchanan served as editor of the Blairsville, GA Union Sentinel for 13 weeks in 2005. The Atlanta Journal-Constitution said:

To anyone with access to Google, it's the surreal story of a conspiracy theorist and fringe presidential candidate who once broke a briefly infamous story about Bush family financial links to a Nazi sympathizer — a story that nearly destroyed him.

This journalist tried to leave his mental and legal problems behind for rustic serenity ...

(about the Union Banking Corporation story) After Buchanan's story was published, The Associated Press investigated the allegations. Jonathan Salant, the AP reporter, said he "couldn't prove everything" Buchanan asserted, but wrote a story on what he found in the archives. The documents did show that Prescott Bush served on the bank board but was never charged with any crime.

== See also ==
- Full list of candidates in the U.S. presidential election, 2004
