= 2004 Libertarian National Convention =

United States political event

- 2004 presidential election
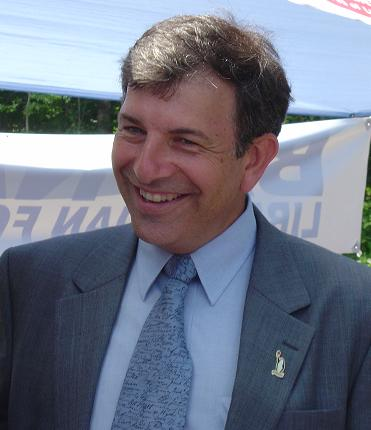
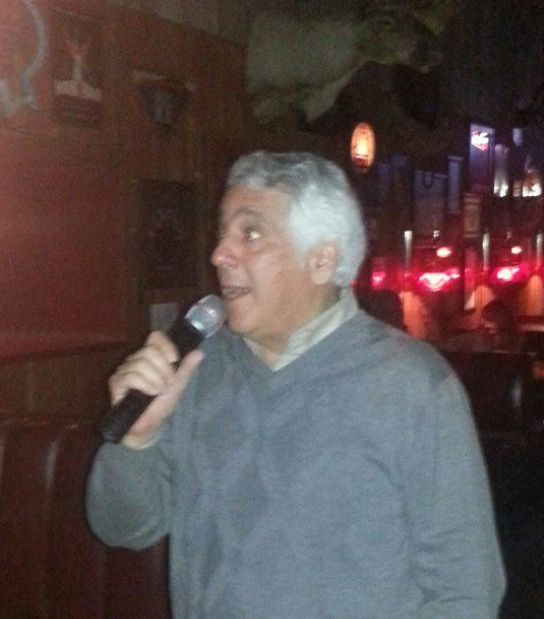
- Nominees; Badnarik and Campagna

Convention
- Date(s): May 28–31, 2004
- City: Atlanta Georgia
- Venue: Marriott Marquis Hotel

Candidates
- Presidential nominee: Michael Badnarik of Texas
- Vice-presidential nominee: Richard Campagna of Iowa
- Other candidates: Gary Nolan of Ohio; Aaron Russo of California

The 2004 Libertarian National Convention was held from May 28 to May 31, 2004, at the Marriott Marquis Hotel in Atlanta, Georgia. The delegates at the convention, on behalf of the U.S. Libertarian Party, nominated Michael Badnarik for president and Richard Campagna for vice president in the 2004 presidential election. The convention was televised nationally on C-SPAN.

Libertarians hold a National Convention every two years to vote on party bylaws, platform and resolutions and elect national party officers and a judicial committee. Every four years it nominates presidential and vice presidential candidates.

== Speakers ==
Those which attended include:

- Michael Badnarik, activist
- Gary Nolan, radio host
- Aaron Russo, businessman and filmmaker
- Ron Paul, former Libertarian presidential candidate and Republican Congressman
- Neal Boortz, national syndicated radio talk show host
- James Bovard, author of Terrorism and Tyranny
- Sheriff Richard Mack
- David Nolan, co-founder of the Libertarian Party
- Michael Colley, retired United States Navy vice admiral
- Dean Cameron, actor
- Jim Gray, judge of the Superior Court of Orange County, California, author
- Dr. Mary Ruwart, author
- Ed Thompson, nominee for Governor of Wisconsin in 2012
- Jimmie Vaughan, musician

== Voting for presidential nomination ==
=== First ballot ===
After the first round, a motion was passed to suspend the rules and allow only the top three candidates from the first round to proceed to the second ballot.

2004 Libertarian Party National Convention total vote count: Round 1
Candidate	Total votes cast	Percent of votes cast
Aaron Russo	258	33.2%
Michael Badnarik	256	32.9%
Gary Nolan	246	31.6%
None of the Above	10	1.3%
Jeffrey Diket	4	0.5%
Drew Carey	3	0.4%
Dave Hollist	1	0.1%
	Color key: / 1st place / 2nd place / 3rd place / 4th place / 5th place / 6th place / 7th place	

=== Second ballot ===
After the second round, Gary Nolan, not receiving the necessary votes to advance, endorsed Michael Badnarik.

2004 Libertarian Party National Convention total vote count: Round 2
Candidate	Total votes cast	Percent of votes cast
Aaron Russo	285	36.4%
Michael Badnarik	249	31.8%
Gary Nolan	244	31.2%
None of the Above	5	0.6%
	Color key: / 1st place / 2nd place / 3rd place / 4th place	

=== Third ballot ===
After the second round of voting, Gary Nolan addressed the convention, endorsing Michael Badnarik for the 2004 nomination of the Libertarian Party.

2004 Libertarian Party National Convention total vote count: Round 3
Candidate	Total votes cast	Percent of votes cast
Michael Badnarik	423	54.4%
Aaron Russo	344	44.2%
None of the Above	11	1.4%
	Color key: / 1st place / 2nd place / 3rd place	

== Voting for vice presidential nomination ==
A separate vote was held for the vice presidential nomination. Per convention rules, nominee Michael Badnarik addressed the crowd, however he declined to declare his preferred running mate.

=== First ballot ===
Richard Campagna of Iowa was nominated as vice presidential candidate on the first ballot.

2004 Libertarian Party National Convention total vote count: Round 1
Candidate	Total votes cast	Percent of votes cast
Richard Campagna	353	56.4%
Tamara Millay	220	35.1%
Garrett Hayes	36	5.8%
None of the Above	10	1.6%
Scott Jameson	7	1.1%
	Color key: / 1st place / 2nd place / 3rd place / 4th place / 5th place	

== See also ==
- Libertarian National Convention
- Other parties' presidential nominating conventions of 2004:
  - Green
  - Democratic
  - Republican
- Libertarian Party of Colorado
- U.S. presidential election, 2004
