= America: Freedom to Fascism =

- Directed by: Aaron Russo
- Written by: Aaron Russo
- Produced by: Aaron Russo; Richard Whitley
- Starring: Katherine Albrecht; Joe Banister; Dave Champion; Vernice Kuglin; Rep. Ron Paul; Aaron Russo; Irwin Schiff
- Music by: David Benoit
- Distributed by: Cinema Libre Studio
- Release date: July 28, 2006
- Running time: 95 minutes Director's Cut: 111 minutes
- Country: United States
- Language: English

America: Freedom to Fascism is a 2006 American film by filmmaker and activist Aaron Russo, covering a variety of subjects that Russo contends are detrimental to Americans. Topics include the Internal Revenue Service (IRS), the income tax, Federal Reserve System, national ID cards (REAL ID Act), human-implanted RFID tags, Diebold electronic voting machines, globalization, Big Brother, taser weapons abuse, and the use of terrorism by the government as a means to diminish the citizens' rights.

The film has been criticized for its promotion of conspiracy theories, its copious factual errors, and its repeated misrepresentations of the individuals and views it purports to criticize.

== Federal Reserve System issues and interviews in the film ==
The film examines the genesis and functions of the Federal Reserve System. The film asserts that the Federal Reserve System is a system of privately held, for profit corporations, not a government agency, and that the Fed was commissioned to print fiat money on behalf of the federal government, at a fee ultimately paid for by the personal income tax (through service on bond interest). The film also refers to the fact that the United States dollar is not backed by gold, and states that this means the dollar has no real backing other than future income tax payments. Consequently, the film states that Federal Reserve Notes represent debt instead of wealth.

The film argues that the Federal Reserve System manipulates what is sometimes referred to as the business cycle of economic expansion and retraction by putting new notes into circulation to increase the ease of obtaining credit, which devalues the currency, then compounds inflation by increasing interest (prime) rates. The movie argues that this manipulation is responsible for a 96% devaluation of American currency, since it was made possible to increasingly sever the link with gold backing by the Federal Reserve Act of 1913. The film says that this process of creating new money and adding it to the money supply is known as debasement and is a cause of inflation. In this way, the film concludes that the Federal Reserve System simultaneously controls the supply of money and its value.

The central thesis of the film may be that this monetary policy is the strongest form of governance that has ever existed, and is central to the unconstitutional, global power ambitions of the interests that supposedly control the Federal Reserve System.

The film also asserts that the private interests are controlling the Federal Reserve System, and have been for generations. The film proposes that most Americans are kept ignorant of how the Federal Reserve operates through actions of corrupt politicians and an increasingly centralized media. By using what the film calls legalistic and economic "mumbo-jumbo” terms such as 'monetizing the debt' or ‘adjusting monetary policy for increased fluidity of credit’, these interests, according to the film, conceal the true actions of the Fed behind veils of legitimacy. Interviews are conducted with several organizations and elected legislators who support these views.

An argument made in the film is that there is no reason why the Federal Reserve System should have a monopoly on the U.S. money supply. The film asserts that "America got along just fine before the Federal Reserve came into existence." This leads the film to the question of why the Federal Reserve System was created.

The film contends that the U.S. Congress has no control or oversight over the Fed, and hence has no control over the value of U.S. money. The film argues that Congressional control over the value of money is required by Article 1, Section 8 of the United States Constitution. The phrase in question (clause 5) states that the United States Congress shall have the power "To coin Money, regulate the Value thereof, and of foreign Coin..."

The film includes a call to action to abolish the Federal Reserve. In 2007, The Boston Globe stated that Congressman Ron Paul, "says he doesn't agree with all the film's arguments, but he says the film had 'a huge impact' on the support his campaign is drawing", a reference to Paul's presidential bid at that time.

== Federal income tax issues and interviews in the film ==
Through interviews with various individuals including former IRS agents, Russo sets forth the tax protester argument that, "there is no law requiring an income tax", and that the personal income tax is illegally enforced to support the activities of the Federal Reserve System.

One of the listed stars of the film, Irwin Schiff, was sentenced on February 24, 2006 to 13 years and 7 months in prison for tax evasion and ordered to pay over $4.2 million in restitution. In pre-sentencing documents filed with the court, Schiff's lawyers had argued that he had a mental disorder related to his beliefs about taxation. Initially, the film portrays Schiff as a tax expert, though his qualifications and those of many other individuals in the film are not mentioned. Later in the film, Russo reveals that Schiff has been imprisoned.

Schiff appears in the film for another reason as well. The filmmaker lampoons Judge Kent Dawson's reaction to Schiff's defense. The film alleges that the judge "denied Irwin the ability to prove to a jury that there was no law requiring Americans to file an income tax return. He denied Irwin the right to attempt to prove to a jury there was no law ... by stating, 'I will not allow the law in my courtroom.'" At 0:48:28 of the film, Russo introduces the judge and his statement.

Under the U.S. legal system, the general rule is that neither side in a civil or criminal case is allowed to try to prove to the jury what the law is. For example, in a murder case the defendant is not generally allowed to persuade the jury that there is no law against murder, or to try to interpret the law for the jury. Likewise, the prosecution is not allowed to try to persuade the jury about what the law is, or how it should be interpreted. Disagreements about what the law is; are argued by both sides before the judge, who then makes a ruling. Prior to jury deliberations, the judge, and only the judge, instructs the jury on the law.

Another listed star, Vernice Kuglin, was acquitted in her criminal trial for tax evasion in August 2003. This means she was not found guilty of a willful intent to evade income taxes. (A conviction for tax evasion requires, among other things, proof by the government that the defendant engaged in one or more affirmative acts of misleading the government or of hiding income.) Kuglin's acquittal did not relieve her of liability for the taxes. Kuglin entered a settlement with the government in 2004 in which she agreed to pay over $500,000 in taxes and penalties. On April 30, 2007, the Memphis Daily News reported that Kuglin's Federal tax problems continued with the filing of a notice of Federal tax lien in the amount of $188,025. The Memphis newspaper also stated that Kuglin has "given up her fight against paying taxes, according to a Sept. 10, 2004, Commercial Appeal story."

The preview clip for the film includes assertions contradicted by official government publications regarding the activities and nature of such institutions as the Internal Revenue Service and the Federal Reserve System.

=== Constitutional arguments ===
==== Fifth Amendment ====
Russo's argument using the Fifth Amendment goes as follows:

- Premise 1: The government can criminally prosecute someone and put one in jail for information one puts on one's 1040 tax form.
- Premise 2: The fifth amendment says no one can be compelled to incriminate oneself.
- Conclusion: Since filing a 1040 incriminates oneself, filing a 1040 therefore violates one's fifth amendment rights.

Though the second premise is not completely correct, the main source of error lies in the first premise. If one truthfully reports the amount of one's income, one does not incriminate oneself in the commission of a crime. However, falsely reporting one's income is itself the commission of a crime. Put another way, the fifth amendment protects one from incriminating oneself if testifying truthfully will incriminate oneself in the commission of a crime. It does not offer a provision for lying.

The fifth amendment does, however, allow oneself to avoid disclosing the source of the income if doing so would incriminate oneself in the commission of a crime. While that may be the case, a person is still required to report the amount of all income on his or her federal tax return.

==== Sixteenth Amendment ====
The film refers to both article 1 section 8 of the U.S. Constitution, which grants Congress the authority to impose taxes, and disputes the legitimacy of the Sixteenth Amendment (see Tax protester Sixteenth Amendment arguments), which removes any apportionment requirement.

=== Other issues related to taxes ===
Some of the premises of the film include:

- The Federal Reserve System is unconstitutional and has maxed out the national debt and bankrupted the United States government.
- Federal income taxes were imposed in response to, or as part of, the plan implementing the Federal Reserve System.
- Federal income taxes are unconstitutional or otherwise legally invalid.
- The use of the Federal income tax to counter the economic effects of the Federal Reserve System is futile.

== The filmmaker's personal views on taxes ==
As of late July 2006, Aaron Russo's biography on his website for the film stated: "The film is an exposé of the Internal Revenue Service, and proves conclusively there is no law requiring an American citizen to pay a direct unapportioned Tax on their labor."

The New York Times article of July 31, 2006, states that when Russo asked IRS spokesman Anthony Burke for the law requiring payment of income taxes on wages and was provided a link to various documents including title 26 of the United States Code (the Internal Revenue Code), filmmaker Russo denied that title 26 was the law, contending that it consisted only of IRS "regulations" and had not been enacted by Congress. The article reports that in an interview in late July 2006, Russo claimed he was confident on this point. In the United States, statutes are enacted by Congress, and regulations are promulgated by the executive branch of government to implement the statutes. Statutes are found in the United States Code and regulations are found in the Code of Federal Regulations. The Treasury regulations to which Russo may have been referring are found at title 26 ("Internal Revenue") of the Code of Federal Regulations, not title 26 of the United States Code. The argument that the Internal Revenue Code is not law, the argument that the Internal Revenue Code is not "positive law," and variations of these arguments, have been officially identified as legally frivolous Federal tax return positions for purposes of the $5,000 frivolous tax return penalty imposed under Internal Revenue Code section 6702(a).

The article also discloses that Russo had over $2 million of tax liens filed against him by the Internal Revenue Service, the state of California, and the state of New York for unpaid taxes. In an interview with The New York Times; however, Russo refused to discuss the liens, saying they were not relevant to his film.

== Inaccuracies, distortions, and misrepresentations ==
=== Quotation of U.S. District Judge James C. Fox ===
Aaron Russo reads a quote attributed to U.S. District Judge James C. Fox:

If you ... examined [The 16th Amendment] carefully, you would find that a sufficient number of states never ratified that amendment.

The film does not mention the specific court case, which is Sullivan v. United States in the United States District Court for the Eastern District of North Carolina, case no. 03-CV-39 (2003). In the case, the plaintiffs attempted unsuccessfully to prevent the deployment of troops to Iraq. The comments with respect to the Sixteenth Amendment did not constitute a ruling in the case (see Stare decisis) and were mentioned only in passing (see Obiter dictum). The transcript reads (in part):

I will say I think, you know, colonel, I have to tell you that there are cases where a long course of history in fact does change the Constitution, and I can think of one instance. I believe I'm correct on this. I think if you were to go back and try to find and review the ratification of the 16th amendment, which was the internal revenue, income tax, I think if you went back and examined that carefully, you would find that a sufficient number of states never ratified that amendment ... And nonetheless, I think it's fair to say that it is part of the Constitution of the United States, and I don't think any court would ever...set it aside.

=== Quotation of President Wilson ===
Aaron Russo reads a quote widely attributed to Woodrow Wilson:

I am a most unhappy man. I have unwittingly ruined my country. A great industrial nation is now controlled by its system of credit. We are no longer a government by free opinion, no longer a government by conviction and the vote of the majority, but a government by the opinion and duress of a small group of dominant men.

This is a well-known conflation of several quotes, only two of which can actually be attributed to Woodrow Wilson. The source of the first two sentences is unknown, and nowhere on record can be found to be said by Wilson. The third sentence (although slightly altered in this version) is found in the eighth chapter of Wilson's 1913 book, The New Freedom, and originally reads:

A great industrial nation is controlled by its system of credit. Our system of credit is privately concentrated. The growth of the nation, therefore, and all our activities are in the hands of a few men who, even if their action be honest and intended for the public interest, are necessarily concentrated upon the great undertakings in which their own money is involved and who necessarily, by very reason of their own limitations, chill and check and destroy genuine economic freedom.

The final sentence (beginning with "We are no longer..."), although again slightly altered from its original version, can also be found in The New Freedom (ninth chapter), and in its original context, reads:

We have restricted credit, we have restricted opportunity, we have controlled development, and we have come to be one of the worst ruled, one of the most completely controlled and dominated, governments in the civilized world—no longer a government by free opinion, no longer a government by conviction and the vote of the majority, but a government by the opinion and the duress of small groups of dominant men.

That quotation, in this 1913-published book, was referring not at all to the Federal Reserve System, as this film alleges, but instead to the situation that preceded it and that Wilson was attacking: the "trusts" and "monopolies."

=== Quotation of Mussolini ===
Similarly, Russo uses a quotation that has for some time been attributed to Benito Mussolini:

Fascism should more properly be called corporatism because it is the merger of state and corporate power.

Probably, the complete quote in Italian is:

"il corporativismo è la pietra angolare dello Stato fascista, anzi lo Stato fascista o è corporativo o non è fascista"

Translation:

"corporatism is the corner stone of the Fascist nation, or better still, the Fascist nation is corporative or it is not fascist"

=== Quotation from President Bill Clinton ===
The film displays a quote:

"We can't be so fixated on our desire to preserve the rights of ordinary Americans." Bill Clinton, March 11, 1993

What Clinton actually said (on March 1, 1993) was:

We can't be so fixated on our desire to preserve the rights of ordinary Americans to legitimately own handguns and rifles—it's something I strongly support—we can't be so fixated on that that we are unable to think about the reality of life that millions of Americans face on streets that are unsafe, under conditions that no other nation—no other nations—has permitted to exist.

=== Quotation from Judge Kent Dawson ===
Russo includes in text the following from a case against tax protester Irwin Schiff:

Irwin Schiff: "But the Supreme Court said ..."

Judge Dawson: "Irrelevant! Denied!"

Irwin Schiff: "The Supreme Court is irrelevant???[sic]"

Judge Dawson: "Irrelevant! Denied!"

This is followed by Russo's verbal statement:

"Here we have a federal judge railroading an American citizen by saying Supreme Court decisions are irrelevant."

The first line of Schiff's statement in full is "But the Supreme Court said in the Cheek decision". In what follows, Dawson was stating that the Cheek v. United States decision was irrelevant to the particular argument that Schiff was trying to make at the time and not that Supreme Court decisions in general are irrelevant.

=== First Amendment ===
In the film, it is stated:

On August 31, 2005 federal judge Emmet Sullivan ruled the government does not have to answer the American people's questions, even though it is guaranteed in the First Amendment.

The text of the first amendment is as follows:

"Congress shall make no law respecting an establishment of religion, or prohibiting the free exercise thereof; or abridging the freedom of speech, or of the press; or the right of the people peaceably to assemble, and to petition the Government for a redress of grievances."

=== Claim that the film was shown at Cannes ===
Russo's promotional materials state that the film was shown at Cannes in France, implying that it was screened as part of the prestigious Cannes Film Festival. The film's web site states:

America: Freedom to Fascism Opens to Standing Ovations at Cannes!

The international audience at Cannes as well as the European media has been fascinated by Russo’s fiery diatribe against the direction America is heading.

According to a New York Times article by David Cay Johnston on July 31, 2006, however, the film was not "on the program" at the 2006 Cannes Film Festival itself; Russo actually rented an inflatable screen and showed the film on the beach at the town of Cannes during the time of the film festival. The New York Times article states: "Photographs posted at one of Russo's Web sites depict an audience of fewer than 50 people spread out on a platform on the sand."

Subsequently, it was exhibited in theaters in select U.S. cities.

== Reception ==
On the review aggregator website Rotten Tomatoes, 27% of 30 critics' reviews are positive. The website's consensus reads: "This documentary about the American income tax and whether citizens must pay it is more of a scattershot diatribe than a persuasive argument." Metacritic, which uses a weighted average, assigned the film a score of 43 out of 100, based on 11 critics, indicating "mixed or average" reviews.

A review by The New York Times stated that "examination of the assertions in Russo’s documentary, which purports to expose 'two frauds' perpetrated by the federal government, taxing wages and creating the Federal Reserve to coin money, shows that they too collapse under the weight of fact."

== See also ==
- Tax protester conspiracy arguments
- We the People Foundation
