= Michael Badnarik =

American political activist (1954–2022)

- Badnarik in 2004
- Born: Michael James Badnarik; August 1, 1954; Hammond, Indiana, U.S.
- Died: August 11, 2022 (aged 68); San Antonio, Texas, U.S.
- Education: Indiana University Bloomington
- Occupations: Software engineer; author; activist
- Political party: Libertarian

Michael James Badnarik (/bædˈnɑːrɪk/ bad-NAR-ik; August 1, 1954 – August 11, 2022) was an American software engineer, political figure, and radio talk show host. He was the Libertarian Party nominee for President of the United States in the 2004 elections, and placed fourth in the race, behind independent candidate Ralph Nader and the two major party candidates, George W. Bush and John Kerry. Two years later Badnarik ran as a Libertarian Party candidate in the 2006 congressional elections for Texas's 10th congressional district seat near Austin. In a three candidate field, Badnarik came in third, receiving 7,603 votes for 4.3% of the vote.

== Political career ==
Badnarik's political philosophy emphasized individual liberty, personal responsibility, and strict adherence to an originalist interpretation of the U.S. Constitution. All of his positions arise from this foundation. In economics, Badnarik supported laissez-faire capitalism, a system in which the only function of the government is the protection of individual rights from the initiation of force and fraud. He, therefore, opposed institutions such as welfare and business regulation.

Badnarik first ran for public office in 2000 as a Libertarian, earning 15,221 votes (17%) in a race for the Texas legislature district 47. In 2002 he ran for the district 48 seat receiving 1,084 votes, or 2%.

Badnarik was a member of the libertarian Free State Project.

=== 2004 U.S. presidential campaign ===
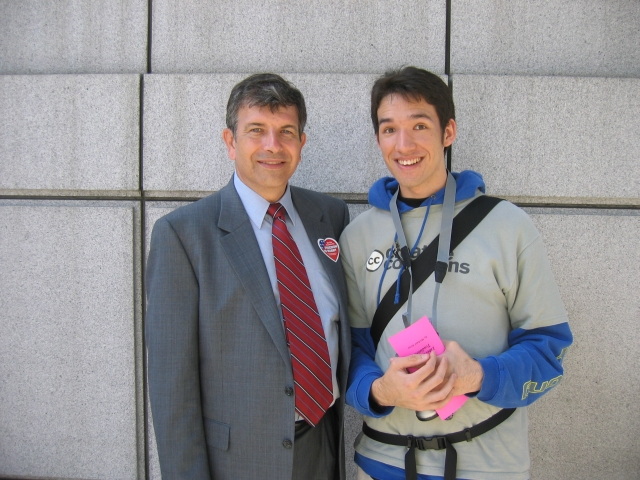
Badnarik with a Creative Commons supporter at a gay pride parade in San Francisco on June 27, 2004.

In February 2003, Badnarik announced his candidacy for the Libertarian Party's presidential nomination and spent the following 18 months traveling the country, teaching a course on the United States Constitution to dozens of libertarian groups. He has written a book, Good To Be King: The Foundation of our Constitutional Freedom (ISBN 1-59411-096-4) on the subject of constitutional law; the book was first self-published by Badnarik, but was released in hardcover in October 2004.

Badnarik was viewed as unlikely to win the Libertarian presidential nomination, facing challenges from talk-show host Gary Nolan and Hollywood producer Aaron Russo. At the 2004 Libertarian National Convention, Badnarik gained substantial support following the candidates' debate (broadcast live on C-SPAN). In what was then the closest presidential nomination race in the Libertarian Party's history, all three candidates polled within 12 votes of each other on the first ballot (Russo 258, Badnarik 256, Nolan 246). When the second ballot placed the candidates in the same order, Gary Nolan was eliminated and threw his support to Badnarik; Badnarik won the nomination on the third ballot 417 to 348, with None of the Above receiving six votes. Richard Campagna of Iowa City, Iowa, was elected separately by convention delegates as his vice-presidential nominee.

Some members of the party disapproved of Badnarik becoming the presidential nominee, feeling that he would be unable to draw media attention that many had felt Russo would have. Libertarian blogger Julian Sanchez called Badnarik "embarrassing."

Badnarik's capture of the nomination was widely regarded as a surprise by many within the party; both Nolan and Russo had outpaced him in both fundraising and poll results prior to the convention. Badnarik commented following his success at the national convention, "If I can win the nomination, there's no reason I can't win this election."

Badnarik and Green Party candidate David Cobb were arrested in St. Louis, Missouri, on October 8, 2004, for an act of civil disobedience. Badnarik and Cobb were protesting their exclusion from the presidential debates of the 2004 presidential election campaign. They were arrested after crossing a police barricade in an attempt to serve an Order to Show Cause to the Commission on Presidential Debates.

Badnarik was not the only member of his family running in the 2004 cycle. His mother, Elaine Badnarik, was nominated by the Libertarian Party for lieutenant governor of Indiana in the 2004 Indiana gubernatorial election.

By the end of the election cycle, Badnarik's presidential campaign had raised just over one million dollars (US), obtained ballot access in 48 states plus the District of Columbia (the Libertarian Party failed to obtain ballot access in Oklahoma and New Hampshire, although Badnarik was a qualified write-in candidate in New Hampshire), and placed nationwide political advertisements on CNN and Fox News, in addition to local advertising buys in the important swing states of Wisconsin, New Mexico, Nevada, and Arizona.

No national polls including Badnarik had put him above 1.5%, though one poll put him at 5% in New Mexico and another at three percent in Nevada. A Rasmussen poll on October 26, 2004, put Badnarik at 3% in Arizona.

Badnarik received 397,265 votes nationwide in the November 2, 2004, election, taking 0.3 percent of the popular vote and placing fourth, 68,385 votes behind Ralph Nader but 12,834 votes better than the party's 2000 election results. Badnarik spent most of early 2005 touring the nation and giving speeches. He also taught a class on the U.S. Constitution, using his experiences on the campaign trail to develop his lesson plan.

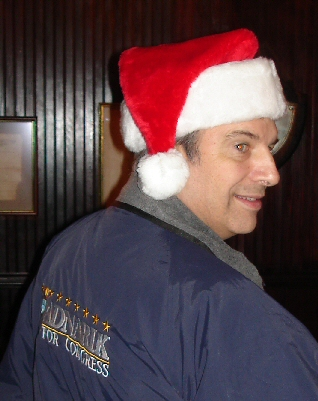
Badnarik, wearing a "Badnarik for Congress" jacket

==== Endorsements ====
- Bob Barr, U.S. House of Representative from Georgia's 7th district (Barr would later run and win the nomination of the party four years later)
- Crispin Sartwell, American philosopher, self-professed individualist anarchist and journalist
- Jimmie Vaughan, musician
- Doug Stanhope, comedian
- Penn Jillette, entertainer, of Penn & Teller
- Aaron Russo, 2004 Libertarian Party Presidential candidate
- Gary Nolan, 2004 Libertarian Party Presidential candidate
- Barry Hess, 2000 Libertarian Party Presidential candidate
- Jo Jorgensen, academic; Libertarian nominee for president in 2020; Libertarian nominee for vice president in 1996; Libertarian nominee for U.S. Representative from SC-04 in 1992
- James Bovard,
- Tim Cavanaugh,
- Nick Gillespie

=== 2006 U.S. congressional campaign ===
In August 2005, Badnarik announced that he would run for the U.S. House of Representatives in the 2006 election. He ran for the 10th Congressional District of Texas, which is currently represented by Republican Michael McCaul.

He raised nearly $450,000 for his campaign and received the Libertarian Party of Texas nomination for its 10th district Congressional candidate.

He received 7,603 votes, or four percent, in the November election, losing to Republican incumbent Michael T. McCaul, who received 55 percent of the vote, and Democrat Ted Ankrum, who got 40 percent.

=== Post-campaign events ===
Badnarik delivered a keynote speech at the 2007 New Hampshire Liberty Forum, where he announced his endorsement for Ron Paul, U.S. Congressman from Texas 14th district, in the 2008 presidential election.

In April 2007, he began hosting a talk radio program, Lighting the Fires of Liberty, on the We the People radio network. His final program aired on October 3, 2008.

In October 2008, he began hosting a talk radio program, by the same title, on the Genesis Communications Network. His final program aired on March 20, 2009.

In November 2009, Badnarik was elected as one of three delegates from the State of Texas to attend the 2009 Continental Congress sponsored by the We The People Foundation, and subsequently elected parliamentary president of that body.

Badnarik suffered a heart attack on the morning of December 21, 2009, while in Viroqua, Wisconsin attending a hearing regarding a raw milk case. After the hearing he boarded a car to go to lunch with friends, then slumped over. His friends attempted CPR and contacted the paramedics. They attempted CPR to revive him three times with no success. Upon the fourth attempt his heart was revived yet with erratic behavior. He was taken by helicopter to Gundersen Lutheran Hospital CCU in La Crosse, Wisconsin.

On January 10, 2010, Badnarik posted a message to his friends and supporters stating that he was improving rapidly and would soon be released from the hospital.

== Issue positions ==
- Abortion: While Badnarik personally opposed abortion, he stated that decisions regarding abortion rights should be made at the state and not the federal level. He recognized that there is significant controversy surrounding when life begins, and argued that therefore the state should not legislate against abortion, since a fetus is arguably not a human life in and of its own.
- Broadcast regulation: Badnarik opposed government regulation of "offensive" content. "I find it very offensive when the government tells me what I can and cannot watch. [...] Individual people should decide what is or is not obscene and they will make that decision by watching or not watching reality TV."
- Campaign finance reform: Badnarik supported eliminating public matching funds and contribution limits for political campaigns.
- Civil rights: Badnarik supported all of the Bill of Rights unequivocally, a position which he claimed contrasts with most political candidates. Badnarik said that government does not grant rights but rather acknowledges them, that they exist independently of government as part of who and what we are, and that, as Thomas Jefferson noted in the United States Declaration of Independence, the only legitimate function of government is to secure them.
- Economic policy: Badnarik argued for elimination of the federal income tax and drastically reduce government spending. He advocated the elimination of the Federal Reserve and the restoration of a commodity-based currency.
- Education: Badnarik supported the elimination of the federal Department of Education, claiming that it is both unconstitutional and ineffective. Badnarik called for the privatization of education, which he contended would result in both more effective and affordable alternatives due to free market competition.
- Energy: Badnarik opposed government regulation of the energy industry, arguing that the free market is more effective in controlling prices and maintaining stability.
- Free trade: Badnarik supported withdrawing the U.S. from the North American Free Trade Agreement (NAFTA) and General Agreement on Tariffs and Trade (GATT), commenting, "NAFTA and GATT have about as much to do with free trade as the Patriot Act has to do with liberty". He further contended that the U.S. needed"to get the government out of regulating trade, so that American workers can do what they do best and that is to create wealth."
- Gay marriage and Civil Unions: Badnarik believes that marriage, as a contract between two individuals, should not be a government concern and supports the right of individuals to associate in whatever ways they see fit.
- Gun control: Badnarik opposed restrictions on gun ownership as restrictions on an individual's right to self-defense. Badnarik was a self-professed gun owner who strongly supported the Right to keep and bear arms.
- Healthcare: Badnarik opposed government involvement in healthcare and drug regulation, as he maintained that the drug approval process at that time raised costs for consumers.
- Illegal drugs: Badnarik supported the decriminalization of marijuana and other illegal drugs.
- Immigration: Badnarik believed that, "Peaceful immigrants should be allowed to enter the US at conveniently located Customs and Immigration stations, subject only to brief vetting to ensure that they are not terrorists or criminals, and reasonable consideration of the nation's ability to assimilate them."
- International relations: Badnarik supported the reduction and eventual elimination of government-funded foreign aid programs. His platform additionally called for withdrawal from the United Nations and the eviction of the UN from the United States.
- Iraq War and military intervention: Badnarik supported a rapid withdrawal of U.S. forces from Iraq, while providing for repair to Iraqi infrastructure damaged by U.S. action. He also supported ending foreign intervention.
- Military draft: Badnarik was opposed to any reinstatement of a military draft.

=== Arguments for limited government ===
Badnarik believes that the federal government had exceeded its Constitutional bounds and should be scaled back in favor of a laissez-faire society.

=== Views on taxes ===
Badnarik did not believe that the U.S. Constitution provided for a federal income tax, and posed the tax protester argument that the Sixteenth Amendment to the United States Constitution was never legally ratified.

Badnarik also posed the tax protester argument that the Internal Revenue Code of 1986, as "non-positive law," was only applicable to certain groups, and argues that the only types of income susceptible to taxation are "the domestic income of foreigners, certain foreign income of Americans, income of certain possessions corporations, and income of international and foreign sales corporations" He has also cited the Supreme Court decision Brushaber v. Union Pacific Railroad, in which the Court indicated that the Sixteenth Amendment of the U.S. Constitution did not give Congress any power that it did not have already. He also argues that the Sixteenth Amendment was not properly ratified, citing the two-volume work The Law that Never Was, co-authored by William J. Benson.

One of his key statements on income tax was that the United States grew to be the most powerful nation in the Universe without requiring such a tax, and that it began to falter when the government began to intervene in the economy and individuals' lives. In an August 2004 interview with the journal Liberty, Badnarik stated that he had not filed tax returns for approximately the previous three years as he was unemployed. He further added that he had contacted the IRS to find out his tax liability and to settle up on any taxes he owed. This was an effort to minimize difficulties for his then-campaign for the presidency.

=== Positions on personal identification ===
When Badnarik moved to Texas, he did not obtain a driver's license, due to that state's requirement that an applicant provide a Social Security Number and fingerprint. Identification is supplied by carrying a United States passport.

== 2004 Ohio recount ==
After the 2004 presidential election, Badnarik, working with Green Party candidate David Cobb, sought a recount of the Ohio vote. This caused controversy within the Libertarian Party, as presidential second place candidate John Kerry had not contested the vote in Ohio, and a recount would cost the state an estimated $1.5 million of tax-payer money. Some party members were concerned that a recount would damage the public perception of the Libertarian party.

Badnarik said that he decided to push for a recount after receiving "about two dozen passionate requests to do so from Libertarians in various states."

== Good to Be King ==
In his book Good to Be King Badnarik suggests that it is unnecessary to have a driver's license to drive, that the IRS has no Constitutional authority to collect taxes, and that common law marriages are valid in all 50 states.

== Death ==
Badnarik died from heart failure at his home in San Antonio, Texas, on August 11, 2022, aged 68. He was cremated through the Neptune Society.

== See also ==
- List of candidates in the 2004 United States presidential election
- Free State Project

== General references ==
- Bradford, R. W. "An Interview with Michael Badnarik". Liberty. Archived from the original on October 26, 2007.

Party political offices
Preceded by Harry Browne	Libertarian nominee for President of the United States; 2004	Succeeded by Bob Barr
