= Rude Awakening (film) =

- Theatrical release poster
- Directed by: David Greenwalt; Aaron Russo
- Screenplay by: Neil Levy; Richard LaGravenese
- Story by: Neil Levy
- Produced by: Aaron Russo
- Starring: Cheech Marin; Eric Roberts; Julie Hagerty; Robert Carradine; Buck Henry; Louise Lasser; Cindy Williams; Andrea Martin; Cliff DeYoung
- Cinematography: Newton Thomas Sigel
- Edited by: Paul Fried
- Music by: Jonathan Elias
- Production companies: Aaron Russo Entertainment; HBO
- Distributed by: Orion Pictures
- Release date: August 16, 1989 (U.S.)
- Running time: 100 minutes
- Country: United States
- Language: English
- Budget: $10 million
- Box office: $3,169,719 (USA)

Rude Awakening is a 1989 comedy film directed by David Greenwalt and Aaron Russo.

== Plot ==
In 1969 New York City, two hippies, Fred Wook and Jesus Monteya, flee the US to avoid being arrest by the FBI and hide out in the jungles of Central America. Fred is an idealist, working on an underground newspaper with his friend Sammy, while Jesus is a stoner whose brain has been fried after being given huge amounts of LSD by researchers (the theory being that acid and appropriate visual stimulation can turn pacifist hippies into committed soldiers; Jesus proves their failure by wishing them 'peace' as he leaves the lab.) The two flee the inner-city commune they are living in, leaving behind Sammy who feels it is important that he keep writing and publishing their message, and Fred's girlfriend, artist Petra.

Twenty years later, Fred and Jesus are still living in the jungle, when they find a dying man who has been shot by soldiers. He gives them some documents and tells them it is vital they get the papers back to the US government. The documents imply that the US is planning to invade that very country, and outraged, Fred and Jesus decide to return to the US to get the action stopped. Having been living in isolation (and by implication, stoned the entire time) for the last 20 years, Fred and Jesus return to New York City only to find the 1980s, entrenched in the yuppie ethos, to be something of a shock. Sammy and Petra have both embraced the materialistic culture, and it takes considerable persuasion from Fred and Jesus before they will agree to help.

Fred, Jesus, Sammy, and Petra join forces to lead a sit-in at the University of New York to protest the planned invasion, which leaves the group despondent; the student body is indifferent and the documents turn out to be a theoretical exercise and not any genuine invasion plans. However, the controversy brought up by their publication implies that Americans would welcome a war "we can win" and so the invasion actually happens.

Fred is broken by the idea that he started a war, and gives up all hope for the world and human race in general. Fred plans to leave New York with Jesus for places unknown, while Sammy and Petra refuse to come along with them — reluctant to give up their yuppie lifestyle. Just then on the street, some college students show up and ask Fred for his help in mobilising action; they are concerned by the numerous ecological and social problems they see around them and that Fred's sit-down protest at the university inspired them. Fred realizes that despite having failed in his personal mission to prevent war, as long as there are young and idealistic people out there that share his views, there will always be hope for the world.

The film closes with an onscreen sing-along to the song "Revolution" during the closing credits.

== Cast ==
- Cheech Marin as Jesus Monteya
- Eric Roberts as Fred Wook
- Julie Hagerty as Petra Black
- Robert Carradine as Sammy Margolin
- Cindy Williams as June Margolin
- Tom Sizemore as Ian
- Buck Henry as Lloyd Stool
- Andrea Martin as April Stool
- Louise Lasser as Ronnie
- Cliff De Young as FBI Agent Brubaker

Cameos

- Timothy Leary as Diner At Ronnie's
- Bobby Seale as Diner At Ronnie's
- Aaron Russo as The Voice of The Fish

== Production ==
The film was the first to be produced by Aaron Russo Entertainment. The company was financed by HBO, Viacom, the Rank Organisation and Cineplex Odeon. HBO received video and cable rights to the film and Viacom network syndication rights. Rank were to distribute the film internationally and Cineplex Odeon in Canada. US distributor Orion was not involved in financing.

== Critical reception ==
Rude Awakening received negative reviews from critics. It currently holds a 19% rating on Rotten Tomatoes based on 21 reviews, with an average rating of 4.0/10.

Vincent Canby of The New York Times found it endearing but lightweight: "[The film] is hapless but endearing, much like its principal characters... It is not witless, but it has no clearly defined style. It wanders, more or less aimlessly, in the way of a well-meaning, naive flower child."

Roger Ebert of The Chicago Sun-Times gave the film zero out of four stars and expressed his dislike of it:

"Rude Awakening is such a hapless movie that one is tempted to be charitable toward it, to describe it as a sincere idea gone horribly wrong, rather than as an exercise in idiocy. But kindness is the wrong policy here, I think; the perpetrators of this film should instead be encouraged to seek out entirely new directions for their next work... No one in this movie has an adequate intelligence level. The dialogue of the characters is half-witted, their actions are inexplicable, and to the degree that they possess personalities, they are boring, self-important clods."

Gene Siskel of the Chicago Tribune gave the film half of one star out of four, calling it "A disastrous hippy comedy ... The biggest problem with the movie is that the script makes no sense, has no consistency and contains few laughs in its patently obvious putdown of yuppie life. How bad is this film? Would you believe that Cheech Marin gives the most credible performance?" Kevin Thomas of the Los Angeles Times called the film "endearing but uneven," writing that the two directors were "unable to give satire the crisp form and sharp pacing it needs to hit the mark squarely. 'Rude Awakening' is more enjoyable than many slicker but less ambitious films, yet it could have been so much better." Rita Kempley of The Washington Post called it "stupefyingly idiotic ... a calamity of wasted potential and a lost forum for environmental and social issues."
