= 1996 United States Senate election in Mississippi =

- November 5, 1996
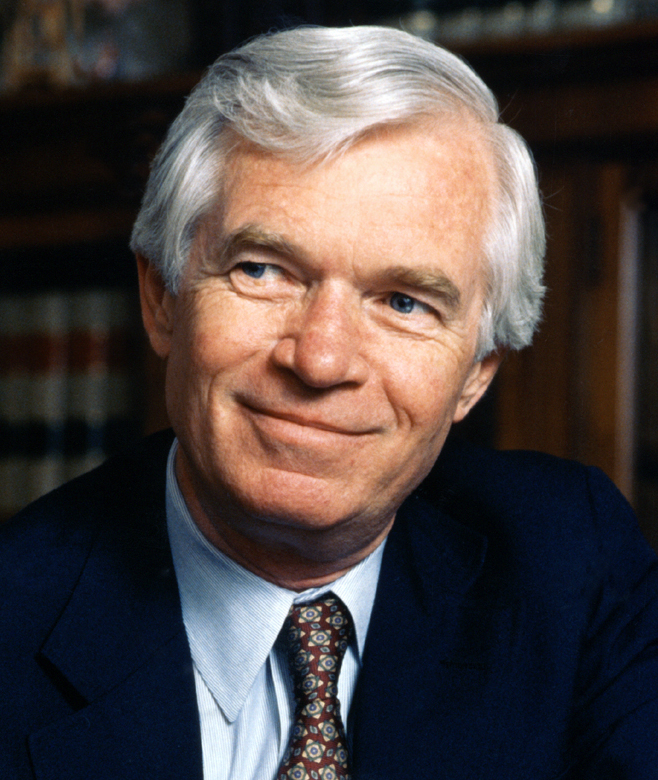

Nominee	Thad Cochran	Bootie Hunt
Party	Republican	Democratic
Popular vote	624,154	240,647
Percentage	71.03%	27.39%
- County results Cochran: 40–50% 50–60% 60–70% 70–80% 80–90% >90% Hunt: 50–60%
U.S. senator before election
Thad Cochran
Republican
Elected U.S. Senator
Thad Cochran
Republican

The 1996 United States Senate election in Mississippi was held on November 5, 1996. Incumbent Republican U.S. Senator Thad Cochran won re-election to a fourth term.

== Major candidates ==
=== Democratic ===
- Bootie Hunt, retired factory worker
- Shawn O'Hara

=== Republican ===
- Thad Cochran, incumbent U.S. Senator

== Results ==
County Flips: Democratic Flip / Republican Hold

Mississippi U.S. Senate Election, 1996
Party	Candidate	Votes	%
Republican	Thad Cochran (incumbent)	624,154	71.03%
Democratic	Bootie Hunt	240,647	27.39%
Independent	Ted Weill	13,861	1.58%
Republican hold			

== See also ==
- 1996 United States Senate elections
