= Ralph Nader 2004 presidential campaign =

American political campaign

- Campaign: U.S. presidential election, 2004
- Candidate: Ralph Nader; Founder of Public Citizen and progressive activist
- Affiliation: Independent
- Status: Lost election
- Key people: Peter Camejo (Running mate); Jan D. Pierce (Running mate, Alabama & New York); Karen Sanchirico (Running mate, Montana)

Website
- http://www.votenader.org/ (archived - November 1, 2004)

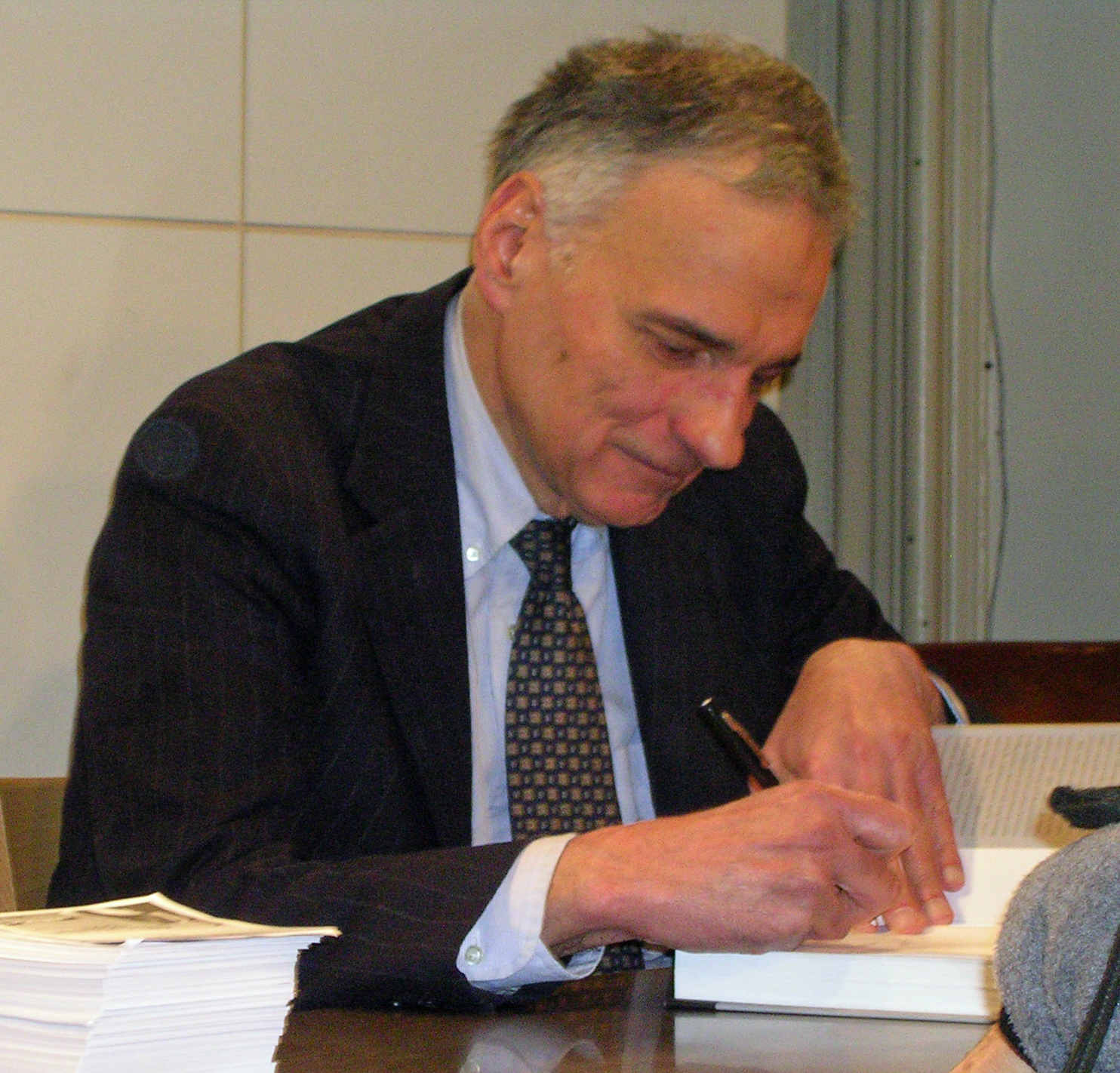
Nader, photographed in 2007

The 2004 presidential campaign of Ralph Nader, political activist, author, lecturer and attorney began on February 23, 2004. This was Nader's third presidential campaign, having run in 1996 and 2000 campaign as the candidate for the Green Party; in 2004 he ran as an independent candidate. Nader won the endorsement of the Reform Party USA, and thus appeared on the ballot as the Reform Party candidate in several states. In some states, Nader was on the ballot as an independent candidate, while in other states, Nader was deemed not to have met the requirements for ballot access.

== Background ==
In April 2003, Salon reported that Ralph Nader was weighing whether to run for president in 2004, and that he was leaning towards doing so; he also met with several Green Party officials to discuss the possibility. In December 2003, he announced that he would not seek the Green Party's presidential nomination the following year.

== Announcement ==
Nader announced his intention to run for president during a February 22, 2004, appearance on the NBC's Meet the Press. He stated, in part, that "After careful thought and my desire to retire our supremely elected president, I've decided to run as an independent candidate for president." During the appearance, he also expressed his support for impeaching George W. Bush, deemed the Democratic Party a "captive of corporate interests", criticized the "two-party duopoly", and called Washington, DC, "corporate occupied territory". During his appearance on the show, there were more than one dozen protestors outside the NBC studio, objecting to his decision to run, in addition to another dozen supporting his candidacy.

Later that morning, Democratic National Committee chair Terry McAuliffe appeared on CBS's Face the Nation and was asked for his reaction to Nader's announcement; McAuliffe deemed it "very unfortunate" but also predicted that Nader's disassociation from the Green Party would hinder him and that the national Green Party would recognize that "the stakes are so big this time" compared to 2000. New Mexico governor Bill Richardson claimed that Nader's campaign was "about him. It's about his ego. It's about his vanity and not about a movement." Candidates running in the Democratic primary were generally dismissive of Nader's announcement as well, with John Kerry announcing that he planned to "appeal to everybody in this race, and we'll make it unnecessary in the end for an alternative" and John Edwards responding that his goal was to unite voters across the ideological spectrum and that Nader "will not impact my campaign."

== Campaign ==
=== Party lines ===
==== Populist Party ====
In states where ballot access is more readily available by forming a new political party than by filing as an independent candidate, the Ralph Nader campaign chose to create the Populist Party. Nader appeared on the 2004 general election ballot under the designation "A Better Life" in the State of Minnesota and "The Better Life" in the State of Louisiana.

This Populist Party had no connection either to the much earlier American political party of that name or to the late-twentieth century Populist Party, which ran candidates such as David Duke and Bo Gritz and was widely regarded as a racist, white supremacist organization.

The Nader campaign expected that the new Populist Party organization would exist only for the limited purpose of achieving ballot access for Ralph Nader in 2004. However, an effort was made by the Populist Party of Maryland to field candidates for governor, other statewide seats, and at the local level for the State Assembly, county, and municipal positions in the 2005 and 2006 elections.

==== Reform Party ====
On May 11, 2004, the Reform Party endorsed Nader over a teleconference for presidential nominations. Nader defeated five other candidates, including industrialist and future nominee Ted Weill. The nomination gave him ballot access in seven additional states: Colorado, Florida, Kansas, Michigan, Mississippi, Montana, and South Carolina.

==== Other parties ====
In Delaware, Nader accepted the endorsement of the Independent Party of Delaware on August 15. In New York Nader was nominated by the Independence Party at their party convention, and also appeared on the ballot under the Peace and Justice Party ballot lines.

=== Ballot access ===
As of October 26, 2004, Nader was slated to appear on the ballot in 34 states and Washington, D.C., and was off the ballot in eight states: California, Georgia, Indiana, Massachusetts, Missouri, Ohio, Oklahoma, and Virginia.

The Nader campaign failed to gain a spot on a number of state ballots, and faced legal challenges to its efforts in a number of states. In some cases, state officials found large numbers of submitted voter petitions invalid. While Nader campaign officials blamed legal challenges by the Democratic Party for their difficulties in getting Nader's name on the ballot, the difficulties faced by petition-gatherers were also a significant factor – there were far fewer people in 2004 eager to sign petitions for Ralph Nader, and petition-gatherers complained that they often received verbal abuse from people they solicited. One of Nader's California organizers observed that "paid signature gatherers did not work for more than a week or two. They all quit. They said it was too abusive."

On April 5, 2004, Nader failed in an attempt to get on the Oregon ballot. "Unwritten rules" disqualified over 700 valid voter signatures, all of which had already been verified by county elections officers, who themselves signed and dated every sheet with an affidavit of authenticity (often with a county seal as well). This subtraction left Nader 218 short of the 15,306 needed. He vowed to gather the necessary signatures in a petition drive. Secretary of State Bill Bradbury disqualified many of his signatures as fraudulent; the Marion County Circuit Court ruled that this action was unconstitutional as the criteria for Bradbury's disqualifications were based upon "unwritten rules" not found in electoral code, but the state Supreme Court ultimately reversed this ruling. Nader appealed this decision to the US Supreme Court, but a decision did not arrive before the 2004 election.

In a majority of states where Nader's name was not printed on the ballot, write-in votes for the Nader/Camejo ticket were still permitted and counted.

In Alabama and New York, a ballot line appeared in which running mate Peter Camejo was replaced with Jan D. Pierce, a Vice President of the Communications Workers of America and in 2000 was head of "Labor for Nader." Pierce had also been filed as his running mate in Ohio, where they failed to get on the ballot. In Montana Camejo was replaced with Karen Sanchirico, an Ada County, Idaho Green Party activist and founder of the Idaho Patriots.

==== On the ballot ====
Per CNN:

- Alabama
- Alaska
- Arkansas (disputed)
- Colorado
- Connecticut
- Delaware
- District of Columbia
- Florida (disputed)
- Iowa
- Kansas
- Kentucky
- Louisiana
- Maine
- Maryland
- Michigan
- Minnesota
- Mississippi
- Montana
- Nebraska
- Nevada
- New Hampshire
- New Jersey
- New Mexico
- New York
- North Dakota
- Rhode Island
- South Carolina
- South Dakota
- Tennessee
- Utah
- Vermont
- Washington
- West Virginia
- Wisconsin
- Wyoming

==== Off the ballot ====
- Arizona
- California
- Georgia
- Idaho
- Illinois
- Indiana
- Massachusetts
- Missouri
- Ohio
- Oklahoma
- Oregon (disputed in Kucera v. Bradbury)
- North Carolina
- Pennsylvania
- Texas
- Virginia

=== Meeting with Congressional Black Caucus ===
Nader attended a meeting with the Congressional Black Caucus. The session soon turned into a shouting exchange and several CBC members stormed out. Nader argued that he would draw enough independents and Republicans away to weaken President George W. Bush. The caucus urged Nader to give up his presidential run, fearing that vote splitting would hurt John Kerry, the Democratic Party's nominee. Representative Sheila Jackson Lee (D-TX) called the upcoming election "a life or death matter" for the Caucus members' constituents. Nader accused Congressman Mel Watt of twice uttering an "obscene racial epithet" towards him. Nader wrote the caucus chairman, Elijah Cummings, demanding an apology, but none was given.

== Criticism ==
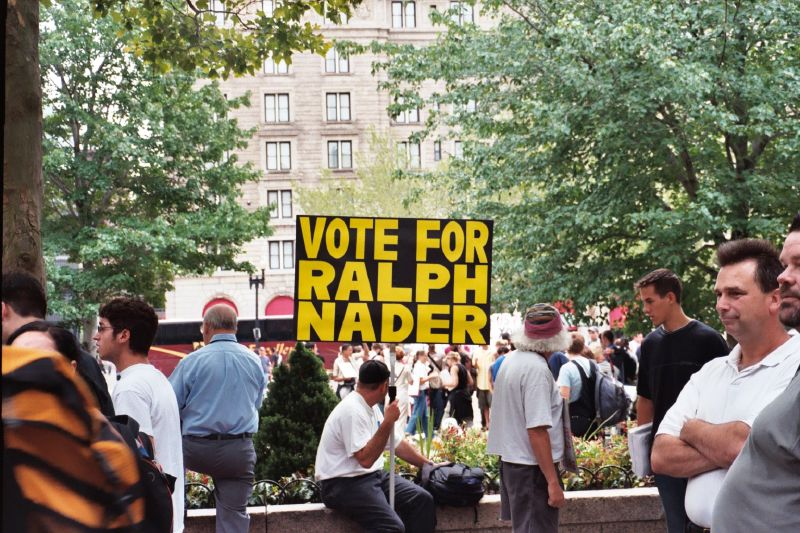
Nader supporter urging others to vote for him with a sign in Boston during the 2004 Democratic National Convention in that city

A number of liberal political figures, including some who had supported Nader's 2000 campaign, asked him not to run in 2004. A Democrat started a website called RalphDontRun.net to ask Nader not to run, and then to ask Nader's supporters to instead support Democratic nominee John Kerry. Former president Jimmy Carter was also critical of Nader's 2004 candidacy; at a March 2004 Democratic fundraiser, Carter said "Ralph, go back to umpiring softball games or examining the rear end of automobiles, and don't risk costing the Democrats the White House this year as you did four years ago". An April 2004 article in the Village Voice, which had endorsed Nader in 2000, also criticized Nader for his campaign, and for his past decisions to spend time campaigning in swing states instead of "safe states".

Nader countered these criticisms by arguing that they were evidence that his detractors couldn’t fault him on policy-related grounds, and pointed to the estimated 45 million Americans who at the time lacked health insurance.

== Results ==
Nader received 465,642 votes, for 0.38% of the total vote while finishing 3rd place once again, though with far fewer votes compared to four years prior.

== Endorsements ==
- Reform Party USA
- Independent Party of Delaware
- Independence Party of New York
