= David Cobb =

David Cobb may refer to:

- David Cobb (Massachusetts politician) (1748–1830), U.S. Congressman
- David Cobb (slave trader) (died 1826), killed in Ohio River slave revolt
- David Cobb (artist) (1921–2014), artist
- David Cobb (activist) (1962–2026), American activist and politician
- Dave Cobb (born 1974), record producer
- David Cobb (American football) (born 1993), American football player
