= 2004 Green National Convention =

US Green Party election

- 2004 presidential election

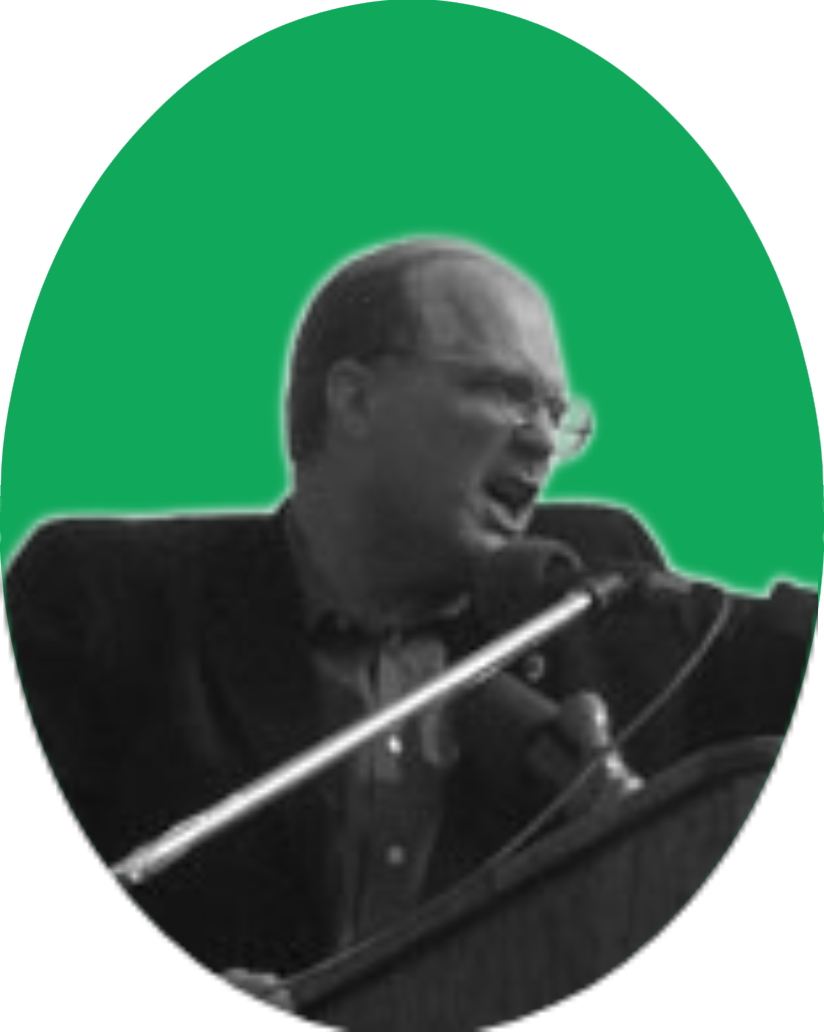
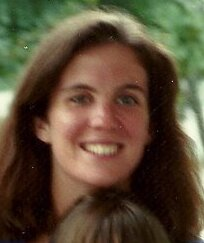
- Nominees (Cobb & LaMarche)

Convention
- Date(s): June 23–28, 2004
- City: Milwaukee, Wisconsin
- Venue: Hyatt Regency Milwaukee and Midwest Express Center

Candidates
- Presidential nominee: David Cobb of Texas
- Vice-presidential nominee: Pat LaMarche of Maine

The 2004 Green National Convention was held at the Hyatt Regency Milwaukee and the Midwest Airlines Center in Milwaukee, Wisconsin on June 23–28, 2004 to nominate the Green Party's candidates for president and vice president.

Ralph Nader, the Green Party nominee for president in 2000, did not seek the nomination of the Green Party, but instead sought the endorsement of his independent candidacy by the party. An endorsement of Nader's campaign would have allowed for each state party affiliated with the national Green Party to choose their own candidate. On the opening day of the convention, Nader's running mate and former Green Party nominee for governor of California Peter Camejo debated David Cobb of Texas, who was seeking the Green Party's nomination against the Nader candidacy.

In that interview, Camejo called on the Green National Convention to endorse both Nader and David Cobb and allow individual parties to choose which candidate to put on their primary ballot. Cobb criticized the Nader-Camejo ticket for not seeking the Green Party's nomination and running independently of the party.

== Round 1 of presidential nomination voting ==
The voting at the national convention was complicated by the broad support for Ralph Nader, the 2000 nominee, in spite of his not seeking nor expressing interest in accepting the Green nomination in 2004. Several candidates, most notably Peter Camejo, presented themselves in various states as stand-ins for Nader. Many Nader supporters voted "no nominee" in order to free the convention and state parties to endorse Nader's independent candidacy. At the time of the convention, Nader had already been endorsed by the Reform Party of the United States of America.

770 delegates voting; majority = 386 votes

2000 Green National Convention presidential nomination: Round 1
Candidate	Total votes cast (770)	Percent of votes cast
David Cobb	308	40.0%
Peter Camejo	119	15.5%
Ralph Nader	117.5	15.3%
No Nominee	74.5	9.7%
Lorna Salzman	40	5.2%
None of the above	35.5	4.6%
Kent Mesplay	24	3.1%
JoAnne Bier-Beemon	14	1.8%
Carol A. Miller	9.5	1.2%
Dennis Kucinich	9	1.1%
Uncommitted	6.5	0.9%
Paul Glover	5.5	0.7%
Dr. Jonathan Farley	6	0.8%
Eugene Debs	1	0.1%
Total	770	100%

== Round 2 of presidential nomination voting ==
According to the Green papers website, Peter Camejo, Carol Miller, Ralph Nader, and Lorna Salzman were eliminated because they did not indicate, in writing, that they would accept the nomination as the Green Party candidate for president.

770 delegates voting; majority = 386 votes

2004 Green National Convention presidential nomination: Round 2
Candidate	Total votes cast (770)	Percent of votes cast
David Cobb	408	53.0%
No Nominee	308	40.0%
Kent Mesplay	43	5.6%
JoAnne Bier-Beemon	8	1.0%
Abstain	3	0.4%
Total	770	100%

== Vice-presidential candidate ==
The party also nominated former gubernatorial candidate Pat LaMarche of Maine as its candidate for vice president.

== See also ==
- Green National Convention
- Other parties' presidential nominating conventions of 2004:
  - Libertarian
  - Democratic
  - Republican
