= James Bovard =

American libertarian author and lecturer

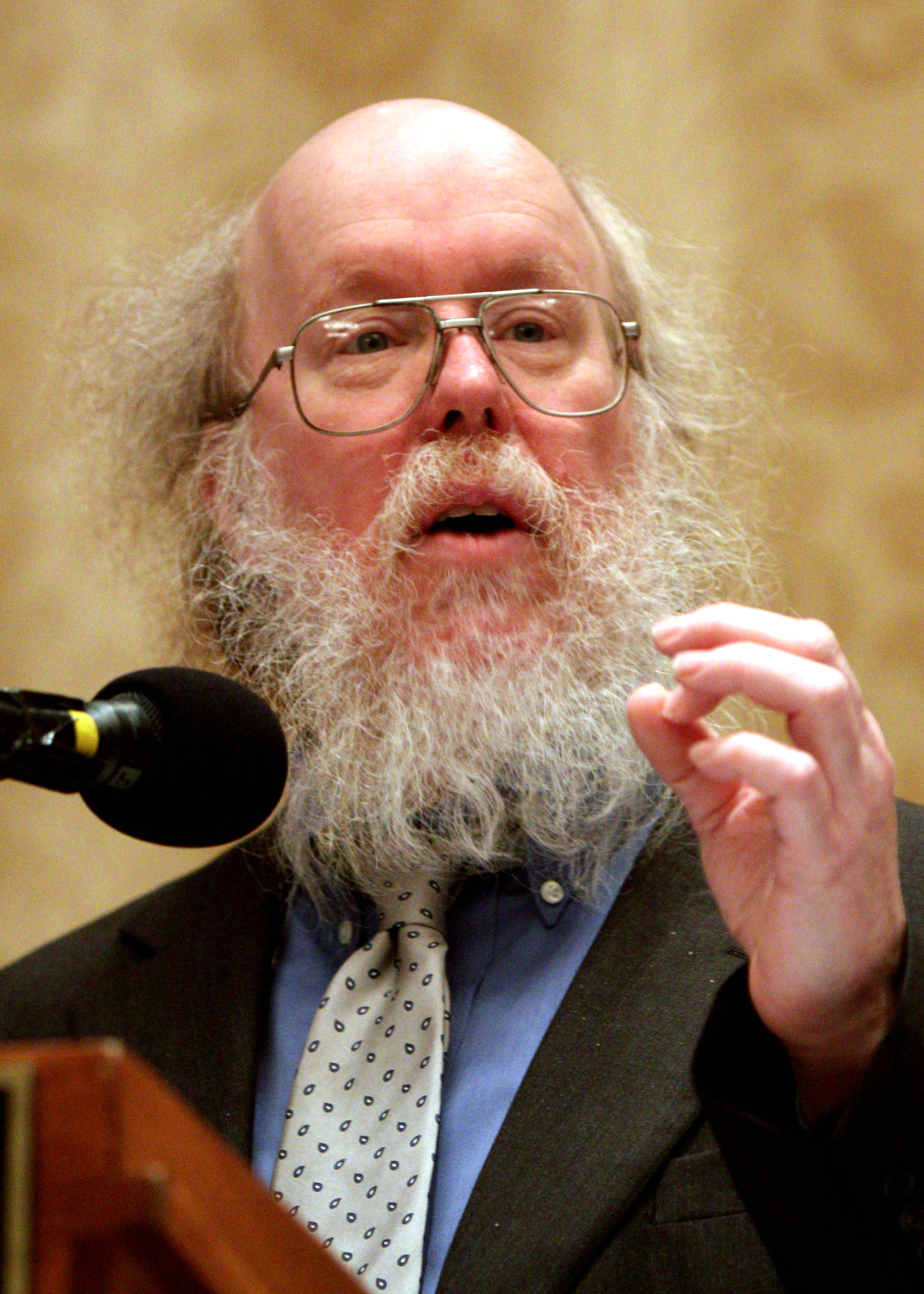
- Bovard speaking in Washington, D.C. in 2011
- Born: 1956 (age 69–70)

James Bovard (/bəˈvɑːrd/; born 1956) is an American libertarian author and lecturer whose political commentary targets examples of waste, failures, corruption, cronyism and abuses of power in government. He is a USA Today columnist and is a frequent contributor to The Hill. He is the author of Attention Deficit Democracy and nine other books. He has written for the New York Times, Wall Street Journal, Washington Post, New Republic, Reader's Digest, The American Conservative, and many other publications. His books have been translated into Spanish, Arabic, Japanese, and Korean.

== Early life ==
He has written Wall Street Journal articles about his experiences as a shiftless highway worker and a one-season Santa Claus. His early career was summarized in a 1988 National Journal profile headlined, "A Free-Lance Crab Apple Shaking the Federal Tree".

== Views ==
In 2017, Bovard criticized President Donald Trump for the missile strike in Syria and referred to it as his "biggest foreign folly." Bovard writes, "Four years ago, Trump warned in a tweet: 'If the U.S. attacks Syria and hits the wrong targets, killing civilians, there will be worldwide hell to pay.' But the Trump administration has sharply increased U.S. bombing while curtailing restrictions that sought to protect innocents. A British-based human rights monitoring group estimated Friday that U.S.-led coalition strikes had killed almost 500 civilians in the past month—more than any month since U.S. bombing began. A United Nations commission of inquiry concluded that coalition airstrikes have caused a 'staggering loss of civilian life.'" He also stated that "Trump's most dangerous innovation involves direct attacks on Syrian government forces."

In 2018, Bovard was critical of Trump, saying that he "has said and done many things to appall the friends of freedom. From Trump's pro-torture comments to his praise of police brutality to his cruise-missile barrage against Syria to his threat to annihilate North Korea, there are ample signs that he scorns a freedom-and-peace posture."

Bovard is a critic of the Transportation Security Administration, writing that "the TSA has a long history of intimidation. In 2002, it created a system of fines to penalize travelers with bad attitudes, charging up to $1,500 for any alleged 'nonphysical interference.' This included any 'situation that in any way would interfere with the screener and his or her ability to continue to work or interfere with their ability to do their jobs,' according to a spokeswoman. The TSA failed to specify exactly how much groveling was necessary and eventually abandoned the regime of fines." He also criticized the TSA's watchlist and concluded that "the TSA's latest anti-privacy charade is yet more evidence that the agency should be done away with. After pointlessly groping countless Americans, the TSA has no excuse for groping more."

== Reception ==
Bovard's work has received both praise and criticism in mainstream outlets. In 1994, columnist George F. Will called him “a one-man truth squad.”

A 1999 Wall Street Journal review referred to him as “the roving inspector general of the modern state.”

In 2007, The New York Times described him as an “anti-czar czar” in a survey of Washington “czar” roles.

== Selected works ==
- The Farm Fiasco (ICS Press, 1989). ISBN 1558150013.
- Fair Trade Fraud: How Congress Pillages the Consumer and Decimates American Competitiveness (Palgrave Macmillan, 1992). ISBN 0312083440.
- Lost Rights: The Destruction of American Liberty (St. Martin's, 1994). ISBN 0312123337.
- Freedom in Chains: The Rise of the State and the Demise of the Citizen (St. Martin's, 1999). ISBN 0312214413.
- Feeling Your Pain: The Explosion and Abuse of Government Power in the Clinton–Gore Years (St. Martin's, 2000). ISBN 031224052X.
- Terrorism and Tyranny: Trampling Freedom, Justice, and Peace to Rid the World of Evil (Palgrave Macmillan, 2003). ISBN 1403966826.
- The Bush Betrayal (Palgrave Macmillan, 2004). ISBN 1403968519.
- Attention Deficit Democracy (Palgrave Macmillan, 2006). ISBN 1403971080.

=== Reception of selected works ===
- On Attention Deficit Democracy: Publishers Weekly noted the book's polemical sweep and emphasis on skepticism toward state power.
- On Terrorism and Tyranny: A Boston Globe review called it a “scathing” account of the post-9/11 war on terror.
