= Ted Weill =

American politician (1925–2009)

Personal details
- Born: July 25, 1925 Grand Rapids, Michigan, U.S.
- Died: November 20, 2009 (aged 84) Pike County, Mississippi, U.S.
- Party: Reform
- Children: 6
- Education: Michigan State University

Theodore C. Weill (July 25, 1925 – November 20, 2009) was an American politician who served as the presidential nominee of the Reform Party of the United States of America during the 2008 presidential election.

== Early life ==
Theodore Clark Weill was born on July 25, 1925, in Grand Rapids, Michigan, to Theodore Weill and Nellie Maude Clark. During World War II he served in the United States Navy.

== Career ==
During the 1996 United States Senate election in Mississippi Weill served as the nominee of the Mississippi Independence Party.

During his life he donated to Ralph Nader, Lenora Fulani, and Lyndon LaRouche's political campaigns.

In 1995, Weill was selected to serve as the chairman of the Mississippi Reform Party, but Shawn O'Hara claimed that he was the chairman. In 2006, Weill submitted a list of Reform Party candidates to the Mississippi Board of Election Commissioners which was accepted over the list submitted by O'Hara.

=== Presidential campaigns ===
Ted Weill 2004 campaign logo

During the 2004 presidential election Weill sought the presidential nomination of the Reform Party, but was defeated by Ralph Nader at the 2004 Reform National Convention. Following Nader's victory Weill endorsed Nader.

During the 2008 presidential election Weill ran for the Reform Party presidential nomination and received the nomination at the party's convention which was held from July 18 to 19, in Dallas, Texas. The party voted 25 for Weill and 3 for Frank E. McEnulty. McEnulty was selected to serve as the vice-presidential nominee. In the general election he only appeared on the ballot in Mississippi, where he received 481 votes, and as a write-in in Alabama, where he got one vote.

== Death ==
On November 20, 2009, Weill died in Pike County, Mississippi.

Party political offices
Preceded by Ralph Nader	Reform nominee for President of the United States; 2008	Succeeded by Andre Barnett
