= Gary Nolan (radio host) =

Radio host and Libertarian presidential nominee

Garrett Nolan
- Born: 1954 (age 71–72); Cleveland, Ohio, U.S.
- Occupation: Talk radio host

Gary P. Nolan (born 1954) is an American talk radio host and a former candidate for the Libertarian Party nomination for President of the United States.

From 1994 to 1998, Nolan hosted USA Radio Daily on the USA Radio Network. From 1998 to 2002, he hosted Nolan at Night on 65 U.S. affiliates of the Radio America Network. He also served as the volunteer President of the conservative group CapitolWatch from 1997 through 1999. Nolan currently serves as Chairman of the Board of Directors for DownsizeDC.org.

At the end of 2002, he resigned from Nolan at Night to seek the Libertarian nomination for president, facing fellow candidates Michael Badnarik and Aaron Russo. Nolan had to resign from his radio show due to a law that prohibits candidates for office making an income while discussing their political views. Nolan pledged to run a practical campaign of reaching out to moderate voters and Republicans dissatisfied with the George W. Bush presidency, particularly in his home swing state of Ohio. Nolan ran as an opponent of the United States Patriot Act, the income tax and foreign military bases, calling for bringing home American troops.

For most of the campaign, Nolan led the field of candidates in primaries and state conventions. He held a 22 point lead in his home state of Ohio. In a closely contested race, Nolan placed third and was eliminated following the second ballot (in contested results) at the May, 2004 Libertarian National Convention. Nolan then encouraged his delegates to support Badnarik, who won the nomination on the next ballot.

Gary Nolan hosted a radio show called The Drive with Gary Nolan in the afternoons on Columbia, Missouri, talk radio station KSSZ "The Eagle 93.9". In February 2010, he began hosting WXTL's "Big Talker" 105.9 in Syracuse, New York, between 4 and 7pm. Nolan left WXTL in April 2011 to return to KSSZ "The Eagle 93.9" to begin a nationally syndicated program.
