= Richard Campagna =

American politician and attorney

- Campagna in 2004
- Born: May 5, 1952 (age 74); New York City, New York, United States
- Education: Brown University; New York University; St. John's University, New York; Columbia University; American College of Metaphysical Theology
- Political party: Libertarian

Richard Vincent Campagna (born May 5, 1952) of Iowa City, Iowa is an American political figure who was the vice-presidential running mate of Michael Badnarik of the Libertarian Party in the 2004 U.S. presidential election.

== Early life, education, and career ==
Richard Campagna is from New York City, and grew up in the Midwood section of Brooklyn.

Campagna has degrees from Brown University (BA), New York University (MA), St. John's University (JD), and Columbia University (MA), and a PhD. After completing his undergraduate degree from Brown University, where he majored in political science, he enrolled at both St. John's University School of Law and New York University for a master's in Latin American Studies.

In the mid-1970s, he practiced in Caracas, Venezuela and Paris, France with companies like Ford and Schlumberger, Ltd. In the roles of Latin American counsel and international counsel for the latter. He oversaw legal operations in approximately 190 countries. After returning to the United States in the early 1980s, he worked as lead counsel for the Motion Picture Association under movie mogul Jack Valenti. Richard then served as general counsel for Fairchild Camera and Instruments in Mountain View, California before they headed back east to New York City in the mid 1980's. He and his wife, also an attorney, started their own international legal consulting firm in the early-1990s, and Richard also wrote and published travel books during this time.

After moving to Iowa City, Iowa in the early 1990s, he completed doctoral coursework at the University of Iowa. He is a consultant in a range of fields, including psychological counseling, legal advisement, teaching, interpretation, and stress management consulting. Richard also participated on the Columbia University's Alumni Council.

== Politics ==
In 2002, Campagna ran on the Libertarian Party ticket for lieutenant governor of Iowa with gubernatorial candidate Clyde Cleveland. Together they placed fourth, receiving 13,098 votes, 1.3% of the total votes cast.

In mid-2003, Campagna became the first candidate to enter the race for the Libertarian Party's vice-presidential nomination (the Libertarian party chooses its presidential and vice-presidential nominees in the convention on separate ballots). He defeated his closest competitor, Missouri libertarian Tamara Millay, on the first ballot at the May 2004 Libertarian National Convention, which selected Michael Badnarik as the Libertarian Party presidential nominee. The ticket of Badnarik and Campagna placed fourth in the 2004 presidential election, receiving just under 400,000 votes nationwide and no electoral votes.

== Personal ==
Campagna lives in Iowa with his wife, Odalys. He is an active proponent of existentialism.

Party political offices
Preceded by Art Olivier	Libertarian nominee for Vice President of the United States; 2004	Succeeded by Wayne Root
