= Aaron Russo =

American film producer (1943–2007)

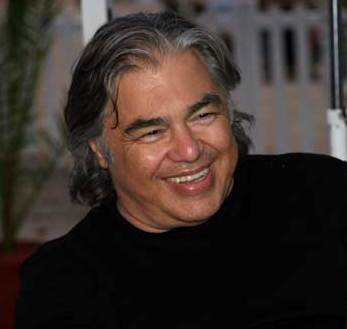
- Russo promoting his film America: Freedom to Fascism at the 2006 Cannes Film Festival
- Born: February 14, 1943; Brooklyn, New York U.S.
- Died: August 24, 2007 (aged 64); Los Angeles, California, U.S.
- Known for: Music manager; film producer; libertarian politician and activist

Aaron Russo (February 14, 1943 – August 24, 2007) was an American entertainment businessman, film producer, director, and political activist. He was best known for producing movies including Trading Places, Wise Guys, and The Rose. Later in life, he created various political documentaries like Mad as Hell and America: Freedom to Fascism that were libertarian-leaning, and controversial for their endorsement of some cultural and political events, some of which are referred to as conspiracy theories. He sought public office as both a Republican and a Libertarian.

== Early life ==
Russo was born in Brooklyn, New York. Growing up in Lawrence, New York, which is on Long Island, he worked for his family's undergarment business. He played prep football at Lawrence High School in Cedarhurst, New York.

== Entertainment career ==
In April 1968, Russo opened the nightclub Kinetic Playground in Chicago, originally naming it the Electric Theater. He booked numerous prominent rock groups and musicians there, including the Grateful Dead, Iron Butterfly, Jefferson Airplane, Janis Joplin, Led Zeppelin, King Crimson, Vanilla Fudge, Rotary Connection, and The Who. In addition to owning the club, Russo managed The Manhattan Transfer and Bette Midler and several other musical acts throughout the 1970s.

Russo then moved into producing and directing films. He received six Academy Award nominations, and two of the films received multiple Golden Globe Award nominations. His first producing credit was for Midler's Clams on the Half-Shell Revue. Other notable feature films he produced include The Rose (1979), starring Midler, and Trading Places (1983) with Eddie Murphy and Dan Aykroyd. His final film was America: Freedom to Fascism, a political documentary critical of the Internal Revenue Service and the Federal Reserve System. It warned about the coming of a New World Order.

In 1987, Aaron Russo set up his own entertainment company, Aaron Russo Entertainment with self-financing so they would not have to disclose the participants' contributions to the production kitty. The company had a $100 million budget for 7 films to be made over 3 years. The company was financed by HBO, Viacom, the Rank Organisation and Cineplex Odeon. HBO received video and cable rights to the films and Viacom network syndication rights. Rank was to distribute the films internationally, and Cineplex Odeon in Canada. All of the ARE productions were to be distributed by Orion Pictures in the U.S., but they did not provide funding. Rude Awakening was the first film to be produced by ARE. Irwin Russo was named senior vice president of Aaron Russo Films, which was based in Los Angeles. The company set up feature projects by 1988, with record division Aaron Russo Films and Aaron Russo Television being formed later.

He was also manager for actors Eric Roberts and David Keith.

== Political career ==
Russo became involved in political issues in the mid-1990s when he produced and starred in the documentary entitled Mad As Hell in which he criticized the North American Free Trade Agreement (NAFTA), the federal government's war on drugs, the concept of a National Identity Card, and government regulation of alternative medicine.

In 1998, Russo highlighted his political interests, running for governor of Nevada as a Republican. During the 1998 Republican gubernatorial primary, Russo was attacked by Kenny Guinn’s campaign as "Dangerous for Nevada." CBS News reported that Guinn regained ground after airing an advertisement using 1996 footage of Russo "ranting about government." The Las Vegas Sun reported that the ad called Russo "Embarrassing to Nevada" and "Dangerous as governor"; Russo dismissed the attack as "name-calling."

After placing second in the Republican primary with 26% of the vote to Kenny Guinn, Russo later endorsed the Democratic nominee, Las Vegas mayor Jan Laverty Jones, who eventually lost to Guinn. Russo planned to run again for Nevada governor in 2002 as either an independent or Libertarian, but was sidelined when he discovered that he had cancer. In January 2004, he declared his candidacy for the President of the United States initially as an independent, but then as a Libertarian. At the Libertarian National Convention in May 2004, Russo received 258 votes to Michael Badnarik's 256 votes and Gary Nolan's 246 votes, short of the majority required to receive the presidential nomination. Russo lost the nomination on the convention's third and final ballot to Badnarik by a vote of 423–344.

In 2006, he produced the documentary America: Freedom to Fascism, which advanced arguments against the legality of the federal income tax and the Federal Reserve. Critics described the film as moving from tax-protest arguments into broader conspiracy claims, including election fraud, Hurricane Katrina gun-confiscation claims, and a New World Order conspiracy theory narrative.

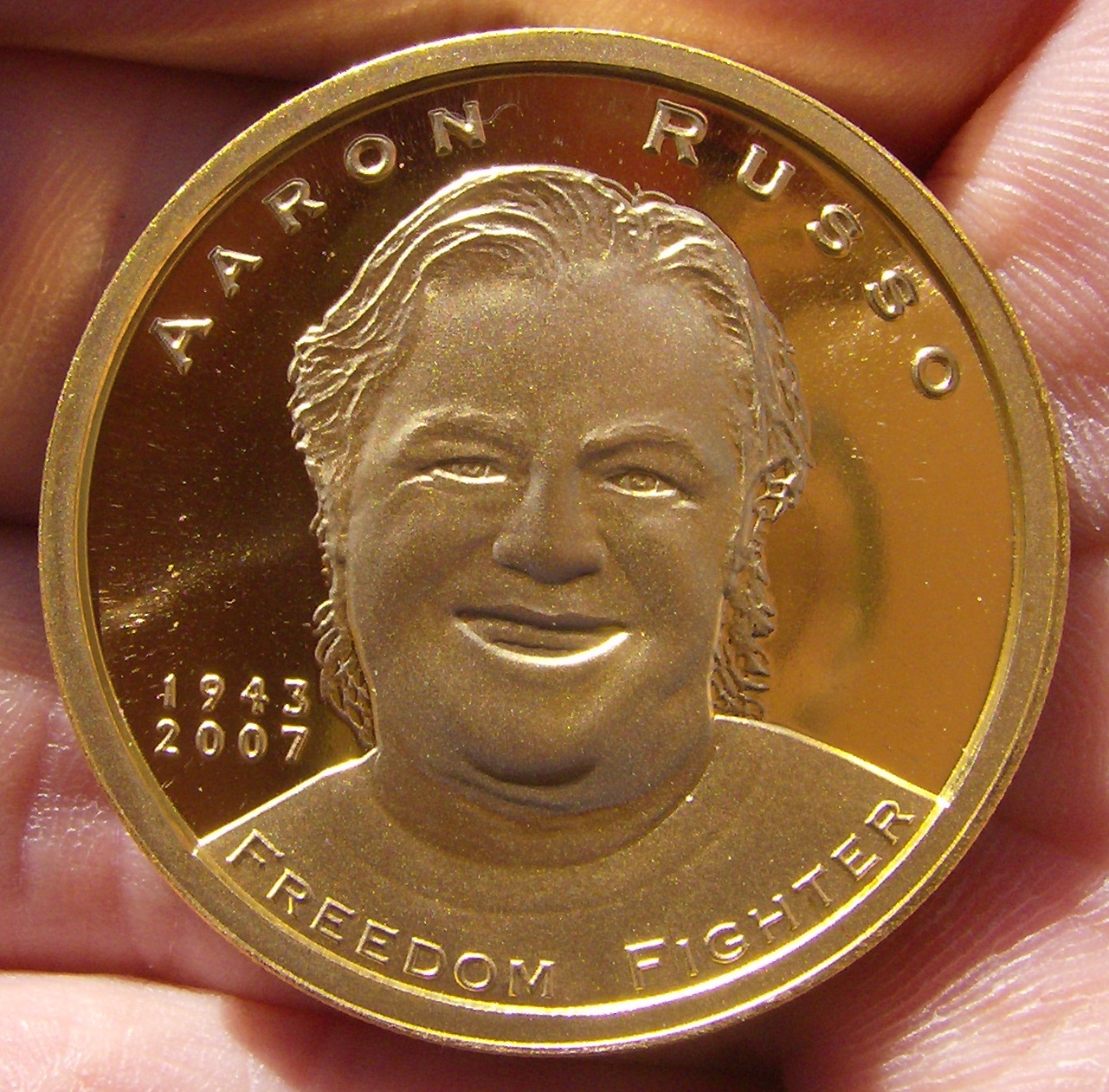
An Aaron Russo Gold Commemorative Memorial Piece

== Illness and death ==
In a February 2004 interview with Las Vegas Weekly, Russo was asked about the bladder and prostate cancer that had derailed his 2002 campaign, and he replied: "The recovery is over. I did strong alternative medicine treatment." On August 24, 2007, Russo died at the age of 64 after a six-year battle with cancer at Cedars-Sinai Medical Center in Los Angeles.

== Filmography ==
=== Film ===
Year	Film	Notes
1979	The Rose	
1982	Partners	
1983	Trading Places	
1984	Teachers	
1986	Wise Guys	
1989	Rude Awakening	
1991	Off and Running	
1991	Missing Pieces	Final film as a producer

=== As director ===
Year	Film
1989	Rude Awakening
2006	America: Freedom to Fascism

=== As an actor ===
Year	Film	Role	Notes
1989	Rude Awakening	The Fish	Voice role

=== Music department ===
Year	Film	Role	Notes
1984	Teachers	Soundtrack album producer	Uncredited

=== Television ===
Year	Title	Credit	Notes
1975	Manhattan Transfer	Executive producer	
1976	The Bette Midler Show	Executive producer	Television special
1976	Standing Room Only		
1977	Bette Midler: Ol' Red Hair Is Back	Executive producer	Television special
