= List of African-American United States presidential and vice presidential candidates =

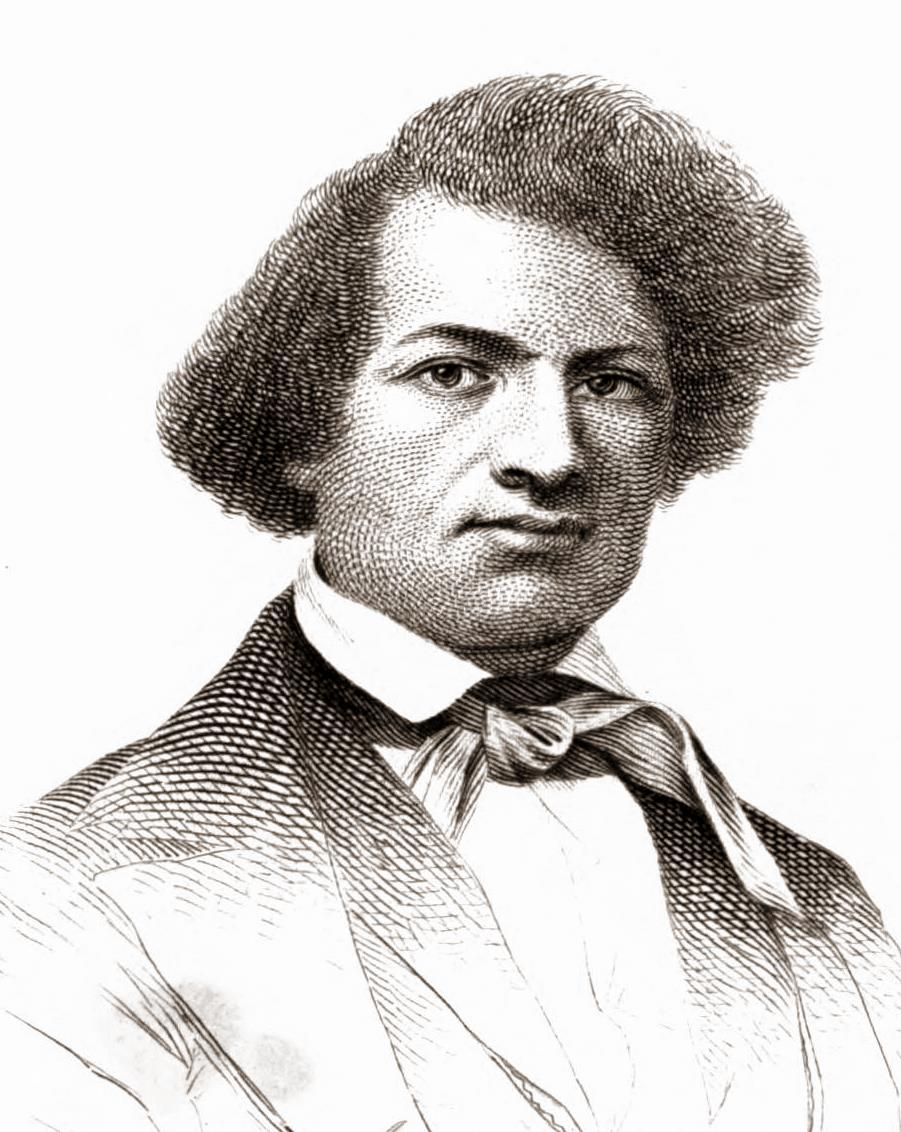
In 1848, Frederick Douglass became the first African-American presidential candidate of the US. His candidacy largely preceded black suffrage and coincided with legal slavery in the U.S.

In 2008, Barack Obama became the first African-American presidential candidate nominated by a major party, namely the Democrats. He was the first African-American to be elected (and re-elected) president of the United States.

In 2021, Kamala Harris became the first African-American, first female, and first Asian-American vice president of the United States. In 2024, she became the first African-American woman nominated for president by a major political party.

The following is a list of African-American United States presidential and vice presidential nominees and candidates for nomination. Nominees are candidates nominated or otherwise selected by political parties for particular offices. Listed are those African-Americans who achieved ballot access for the national election in at least one state. They may have won the nomination of one of the US political parties (either one of the major parties, or one of the third parties), or made the ballot as an independent, and in either case must have votes in the election to qualify for this list. Exception is made for candidates whose parties lost ballot status for additional runs.

Not included in the first and second sections are African-Americans who ran unsuccessful campaigns in nominating conventions or primary elections for their party's nomination (or who have not yet completed that process), write-in candidates, potential candidates (suggested by media, objects of draft movements, etc.), or fictional candidates. The third section includes African-Americans who ran for their party's presidential nomination but who were not nominated, as well as those who are currently pursuing their party's presidential nomination (when applicable).

There have been two African Americans on major party tickets in U.S. history: Democratic presidential nominee Barack Obama in 2008 and 2012 and Democratic vice presidential nominee Kamala Harris in 2020 and presidential nominee in 2024.

Barack Obama was the first African American and first biracial president of the United States, being elected in the 2008 election and re-elected in the 2012 election.

Kamala Harris became the first African-American vice president of the United States of America, being elected in the 2020 election alongside President Joe Biden. She is also the first female vice president. She is the second biracial vice president, the first being Republican Charles Curtis.

== U.S. presidential candidates: party nominees ==
† Denotes winning candidate.

=== Candidates receiving electoral votes ===
African-American presidential nominees, showing running mate and electoral votes received
Year	Name	Party	Running mate	Popular votes	Electoral votes received/total	Opponent
2008†	Barack Obama	Democratic Party	Joe Biden	69,498,215	365/538	John McCain
2012†	Barack Obama	Democratic Party	Joe Biden	65,915,796	332/538	Mitt Romney
2016	Colin Powell	Not applicable	Not applicable	—	3/538	
2024	Kamala Harris	Democratic Party	Tim Walz	71,239,698	226/538	Donald Trump

=== Candidates receiving popular votes ===
African-American presidential nominees, showing running mate and popular votes received
Year	Name	Party	Running mate	Popular votes
1904	George Edwin Taylor	National Liberty Party	W.C. Payne	Scattering
1960	Clennon King	Independent Afro-American Party	Reginald Carter	1,485
1964	Clifton DeBerry	Socialist Workers Party	Ed Shaw	32,706
1968	Eldridge Cleaver	Peace and Freedom Party	Various candidates	36,623
1968	Dick Gregory	Freedom and Peace Party	Various candidates	47,097
1968	Charlene Mitchell	Communist Party	Michael Zagarell	1,076
1976	Margaret Wright	People's Party	Benjamin Spock	49,013
1980	Clifton DeBerry	Socialist Workers Party	Matilde Zimmermann	38,738
1980	Andrew Pulley	Socialist Workers Party	Matilde Zimmermann	6,264
1984	Larry Holmes	Workers World Party	Gloria La Riva	17,985
1984	Dennis L. Serrette	New Alliance Party	Nancy Ross	46,853
1984	Edward Winn	Socialist Equality Party	Helen Halyard	10,801
1988	Lenora Fulani	New Alliance Party	Joyce Dattner	217,219
1988	Larry Holmes	Workers World Party	Gloria La Riva	7,846
1988	James Warren	Socialist Workers Party	Kathleen Mickells	15,602
1988	Edward Winn	Socialist Equality Party	Helen Halyard	18,693
1992	Ronald Daniels	Peace and Freedom Party	Asiba Tupahache	27,949
1992	Lenora Fulani	New Alliance Party	Maria Elizabeth Muñoz	73,714
1992	Helen Halyard	Workers League	Fred Mazelis	3,050
1992	Isabell Masters	Looking Back Party	Walter Masters	327
1992	James Warren	Socialist Workers Party	Various candidates	23,533
1996	James Harris	Socialist Workers Party	Laura Garza	8,476
1996	Monica Moorehead	Workers World Party	Gloria La Riva	29,083
1996	Isabell Masters	Looking Back Party	Shirley Jean Masters	752
2000	James Harris	Socialist Workers Party	Margaret Trowe	7,038
2000	Monica Moorehead	Workers World Party	Gloria La Riva	4,795
2000	Randall A. Venson	Independent	Gene Kelly	547
2004	James Harris	Socialist Workers Party	Margaret Trowe	7,102
2004	John Parker	Workers World Party	Teresa Gutierrez	1,646
2008	James Harris	Socialist Workers Party	Alyson Kennedy	2,424
2008	Alan Keyes	America's Independent Party	Brian Rohrbough	47,756
2008	Cynthia McKinney	Green Party	Rosa Clemente	150,061
2008†	Barack Obama	Democratic Party	Joe Biden	69,498,215
2012	Stewart Alexander	Socialist Party	Alejandro Mendoza	4,405
2012	Andre Barnett	Reform Party	Ken Cross	956
2012	James Harris	Socialist Workers Party	Maura DeLuca	4,117
2012	Peta Lindsay	Party for Socialism and Liberation	Yari Osorio	7,791
2012†	Barack Obama	Democratic Party	Joe Biden	65,915,796
2016	Monica Moorehead	Workers World Party	Lamont Lilly	4,314
2016	Khadijah Jacob-Fambro	Revolutionary Party	Milton Fambro	748
2016	Clifton Roberts	Humane Party	Breeze Harper	86
2020	President R19 Boddie	C.U.P.	Eric Stoneham	3,177
2020	Dario Hunter	Oregon Progressive Party	Dawn Neptune Adams	5,403
2020	Princess Khadijah Jacob-Fambro	Unaffiliated	Khadijah M. Jacob	497
2020	Ricki Sue King	Genealogy Know Your Family History	Dayna R. Chandler	546
2020	Jade Simmons	Independent	Claudeliah Roze	6,958
2020	Kanye West	NA	Michelle Tidball	70,294
2024	Joseph "Afroman" Foreman	Independent	None	TBC
2024	Kamala Harris	Democratic Party	Tim Walz	71,239,698
2024	Mattie Preston	Godliness, Truth, Justice Party	Shannel Conner	TBC
2024	Jasmine Sherman	Green Party of Alaska	Tanya BluBear	Not on ballot
2024	Cornel West	Independent	Melina Abdullah	67,873

== U.S. vice presidential candidates: party nominees ==
† Denotes winning candidate.

=== Candidates receiving electoral votes ===
Until the 2020 presidential election, no African-American candidates had received electoral votes for vice president.

African-American vice presidential nominees of major parties, showing running mate and votes received
Year	Name	Party	Running mate	Electoral votes received/total	Popular votes	Opponent
2020	Kamala Harris	Democratic Party	Joe Biden	306/538	81,268,867	Mike Pence

=== Candidates receiving popular votes ===
African-American vice presidential nominees, showing running mate and popular votes received
Year	Name	Party	Running mate	Popular votes
1872	Frederick Douglass	Equal Rights Party	Victoria Woodhull	Unreported
1928	Simon P. Drew	Interracial Independent Party	Jacob S. Coxey	
1932	James W. Ford	Communist Party	William Z. Foster	102,991
1936	James W. Ford	Communist Party	Earl Browder	80,195
1940	James W. Ford	Communist Party	Earl Browder	
1952	Charlotta Bass	Progressive Party	Vincent Hallinan	140,023
1968	Paul Boutelle	Socialist Workers Party	Fred Halstead	
1972	Julius Hobson	People's Party	Benjamin Spock	78,759
1972	Jarvis Tyner	Communist Party	Gus Hall	
1976	Willie Mae Reid	Socialist Workers Party	Peter Camejo	90,986
1976	Jarvis Tyner	Communist Party	Gus Hall	
1980	Angela Davis	Communist Party	Gus Hall	43,871
1984	Angela Davis	Communist Party	Gus Hall	36,386
1984	Helen Halyard	Socialist Equality Party	Edward Winn	10,801
1988	B. Kwaku Duren	New Alliance Party	Lenora Fulani	31,180
1988	Helen Halyard	Socialist Equality Party	Edward Winn	18,693
1988	Mamie Moore	New Alliance Party	Lenora Fulani	26,487
1988	Florence M. Rice	Consumer Party	Eugene McCarthy	25,109
1992	Willie Mae Reid	Socialist Workers Party	James "Mac" Warren	
1996	Shirley Jean Masters	Looking Back Party	Isabell Masters	752
2000	Ezola B. Foster	Reform Party	Pat Buchanan	449,225
2004	Arrin Hawkins	Socialist Workers Party	Róger Calero	3,689
2004	Jim Lawrence	Socialist Equality Party	Bill Van Auken	1,857
2008	Stewart Alexander	Socialist Party	Brian Moore	7,315
2008	Eugene Puryear	Party for Socialism and Liberation	Gloria La Riva	7,478
2016	Ajamu Baraka	Green Party	Jill Stein	1,457,044
2016	Osborne Hart	Socialist Workers Party	Alyson Kennedy	11,667
2016	Lamont Lilly	Workers World Party	Monica Moorehead	4,003
2016	Eugene Puryear	Peace and Freedom Party	Gloria La Riva	43,445
2016	Angela Nicole Walker	Socialist Party USA	Mimi Soltysik	2,579
2016	Milton Fambro	Revolutionary Party	Khadijah Jacob-Fambro	748
2016	Breeze Harper	Humane Party	Clifton Roberts	86
2020	Karla Ballard	Independent	Brock Pierce	49,700
2020	Dayna R. Chandler	Genealogy Know Your Family History	Ricki Sue King	
2020	Kamala Harris	Democratic Party	Joe Biden	81,268,867
2020	Khadijah M. Jacob	Unaffiliated	Princess Khadijah Jacob-Fambro	
2020	Malcolm Jarrett	Socialist Workers Party	Alyson Kennedy	6,791
2020	Cynthia McKinney	Green Party of Alaska	Jesse Ventura	3,291
2020	Melissa Nixon	Independent	Jade Simmons	181
2020	Raechelle Pope	Independent	Michael Laboch	
2020	Claudeliah Roze	Independent	Jade Simmons	6,777
2020	Angela Nicole Walker	Green Party and Socialist Party USA	Howie Hawkins	404,021
2020	Adrian Wallace	Independent	Mark Charles	3,040
2020	Kanye West	American Independent Party	Rocky De La Fuente	60,160
2024	Melina Abdullah	Independent	Cornel West	67,873
2024	Stephen Broden	Constitution Party	Randall Terry	40,882

== U.S. president: other candidates for party nomination ==
Candidates who failed to receive their party's nomination (or who are currently campaigning for their party's nomination). Candidates who won the nomination belong in the above tables only.

African-American candidates who unsuccessfully sought presidential nomination
Year	Name	Party	Details	Nominee
1848	Frederick Douglass	Liberty Party	1 vote at national convention	Gerrit Smith
1888	Frederick Douglass	Republican Party	1 vote at national convention	Benjamin Harrison
1968	Channing E. Phillips	Democratic Party	67.5 votes at national convention	Hubert Humphrey
1972	Shirley Chisholm	Democratic Party	152 votes at national convention	George McGovern
1972	Walter Fauntroy	Democratic Party	1 vote at national convention; 21,217 votes (71.78%) and winner of Washington, D.C., primary	George McGovern
1976	Barbara Jordan	Democratic Party	1 vote at national convention	Jimmy Carter
1976	Walter Fauntroy	Democratic Party	10,149 votes (30.49%, 2nd place) in Washington, D.C. primary	Jimmy Carter
1984	Jesse Jackson	Democratic Party	466 votes at national convention	Walter Mondale
1988	Jesse Jackson	Democratic Party	1218.5 votes at national convention	Michael Dukakis
1992	Douglas Wilder	Democratic Party	Withdrew before Iowa caucuses	Bill Clinton
1992	Alan Keyes	Republican Party	1 vote at national convention. Keyes was the Republican candidate in the U.S. Senate election in Maryland at the time, and was not actively seeking the presidency in 1992.	George H.W. Bush
1996	Alan Keyes	Republican Party	1 vote at national convention	Bob Dole
1996	Isabell Masters	Republican Party	1052 votes (7th place) in Oklahoma primary	Bob Dole
2000	Alan Keyes	Republican Party	6 votes at national convention	George W. Bush
2000	Angel Joy Rocker	Republican Party	6 votes in Alabama straw poll	George W. Bush
2004	Carol Moseley Braun	Democratic Party	Withdrew before Iowa caucuses	John Kerry
2004	Al Sharpton	Democratic Party	Earned 26 delegates in 5 primaries and caucuses	John Kerry
2008	Alan Keyes	Republican Party	Keyes withdrew from Republican Party on April 15, 2008, but remained on the Republican ballot in several states.	John McCain
2008	Alan Keyes	Constitution Party	125.7 votes (24.36%, 2nd place) at national convention.	Chuck Baldwin
2012	Herman Cain	Republican Party	Withdrew on December 3, 2011.	Mitt Romney
2016	Willie Wilson	Democratic Party	Announced candidacy on June 1, 2015.	Hillary Clinton
2016	John Fitzgerald Johnson	Democratic Party	Announced candidacy on August 23, 2015.	Hillary Clinton
2016	Sedinam Moyowasifza-Curry	Green Party	14.5 votes (3rd place) at national convention	Jill Stein
2016	Monica Moorehead	Peace and Freedom Party	1,369 votes (30%, 2nd place) in California primary	Gloria La Riva
2016	Ben Carson	Republican Party	Announced candidacy on May 3, 2015. Withdrew on March 4, 2016. Earned 9 delegates.	Donald Trump
2020	Cory Booker	Democratic Party	Withdrew before Iowa caucuses	Joe Biden
2020	Kamala Harris	Democratic Party	Withdrew before Iowa caucuses. Harris later became the 2020 Democratic nominee for vice president.	Joe Biden
2020	Wayne Messam	Democratic Party	Withdrew before Iowa caucuses	Joe Biden
2020	Deval Patrick	Democratic Party	Announced candidacy on November 14, 2019. Withdrew on February 12, 2020.	Joe Biden
2020	Sedinam Moyowasifza-Curry	Green Party	11.5 votes (3rd place) at national convention	Howie Hawkins
2024	President R. Boddie	Democratic Party	Was on the ballot in California and New Hampshire.	Kamala Harris
2024	Eban Cambridge	Democratic Party	Was on the ballot in California, Minnesota, New Hampshire, and North Dakota.	Kamala Harris
2024	Larry Elder	Republican Party	Announced candidacy on April 20, 2023. Withdrew on October 26, 2023.	Donald Trump
2024	Will Hurd	Republican Party	Announced candidacy on June 22, 2023. Withdrew on October 9, 2023.	Donald Trump
2024	E. W. Jackson	Republican Party	Failed to obtain ballot access.	Donald Trump
2024	Paperboy Prince	Democratic Party	Was on the ballot in New Hampshire.	Kamala Harris
2024	Tim Scott	Republican Party	Announced candidacy on May 22, 2023. Withdrew on November 12, 2023.	Donald Trump
2024	Jasmine Sherman	Green Party	72 votes (2nd place) at national convention; Green Party of Alaska nominee but not on state ballots.	Jill Stein
2024	Jasmine Sherman	Peace and Freedom Party	1,795 votes (13.1%, 2nd place) in non-binding preference primary	Claudia De la Cruz

== U.S. vice president: other candidates for party nomination ==
African-American candidates who unsuccessfully sought vice presidential nomination
Year	Name	Party	Details	Nominee
1856	Frederick Douglass	Political Abolitionist		Samuel T. McFarland
1880	Blanche Bruce	Republican Party	8 votes at national convention	Chester A. Arthur
1888	Blanche Bruce	Republican Party	11 votes at national convention	Levi P. Morton
1968	Julian Bond	Democratic Party	48.5 votes at national convention	Edmund Muskie
1972	Julian Bond	Democratic Party	1 vote at national convention	Thomas Eagleton
1972	Shirley Chisholm	Democratic Party	20 votes at national convention	Thomas Eagleton
1972	Ron Dellums	Democratic Party	4 votes at national convention	Thomas Eagleton
1976	Barbara Jordan	Democratic Party	17 votes in national convention	Walter Mondale
1980	Mel Boozer	Democratic Party	49 votes in national convention	Walter Mondale
2016	Larry Sharpe	Libertarian Party	264 votes in national convention (1st ballot); 409 votes in national convention (2nd ballot)	William Weld
2016	Derrick Grayson	Libertarian Party	48 votes in national convention (1st ballot); 9 votes in national convention (2nd ballot)	William Weld
2024	Ben Carson	Republican Party	Shortlisted for selection	JD Vance
2024	Byron Donalds	Republican Party	Shortlisted for selection	JD Vance
2024	Cedric Richmond	Democratic Party	Formally vetted for selection	Tim Walz
2024	Tim Scott	Republican Party	Finalist for selection	JD Vance

== See also ==
- African-American candidates for President of the United States
- List of female United States presidential and vice presidential candidates
- Jesse Jackson 1984 presidential campaign
- Jesse Jackson 1988 presidential campaign
- African-American presidents of the United States in popular culture
- List of African-American United States Senate candidates
