= 2016 United States presidential election in Utah =

- November 8, 2016
- Turnout: 82.00% ▲

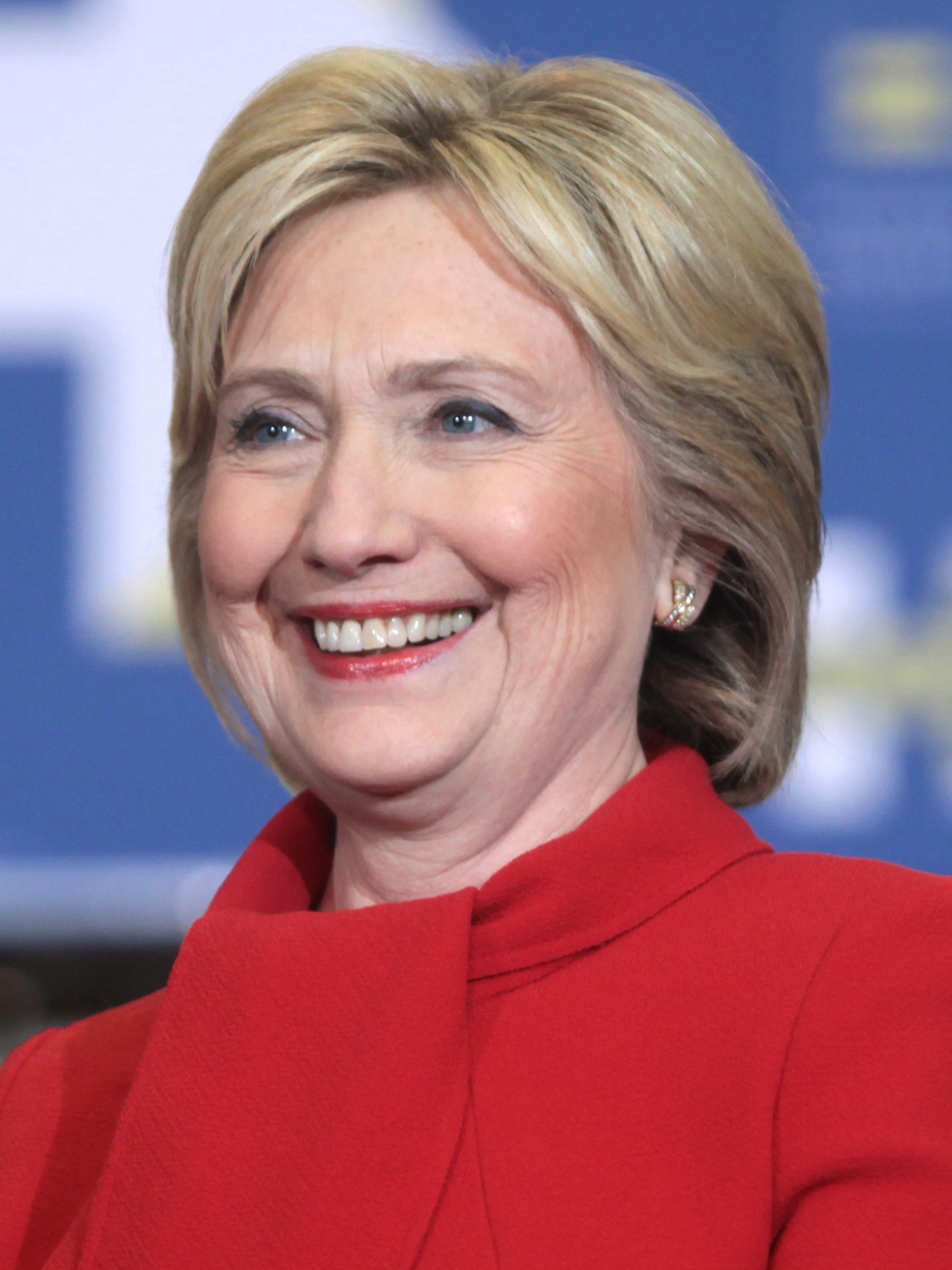

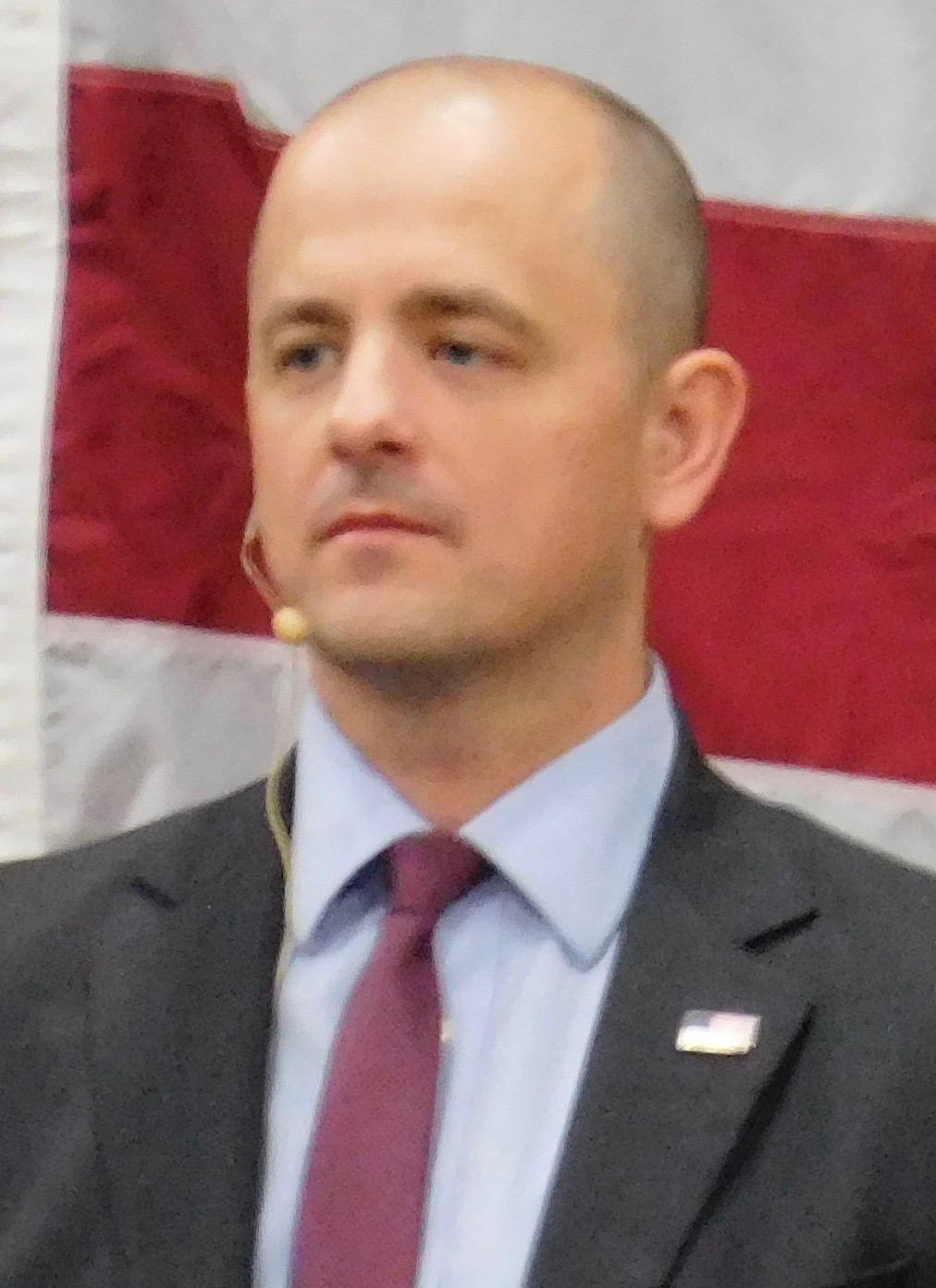
Nominee	Donald Trump	Hillary Clinton	Evan McMullin
Party	Republican	Democratic	Independent
Home state	New York	New York	Utah
Running mate	Mike Pence	Tim Kaine	Mindy Finn
Electoral vote	6	0	0
Popular vote	515,231	310,676	243,690
Percentage	45.54%	27.46%	21.54%

Trump
30–40%
40–50%
50–60%
60–70%
70–80%
80–90%
90–100%
Clinton
30–40%
40–50%
50–60%
60–70%
70–80%
80–90%
90–100%
McMullin
30–40%
40–50%
50–60%
60–70%
70–80%
90–100%
Johnson
90–100%
Tie/No Data
President before election
Barack Obama
Democratic
Elected President
Donald Trump
Republican

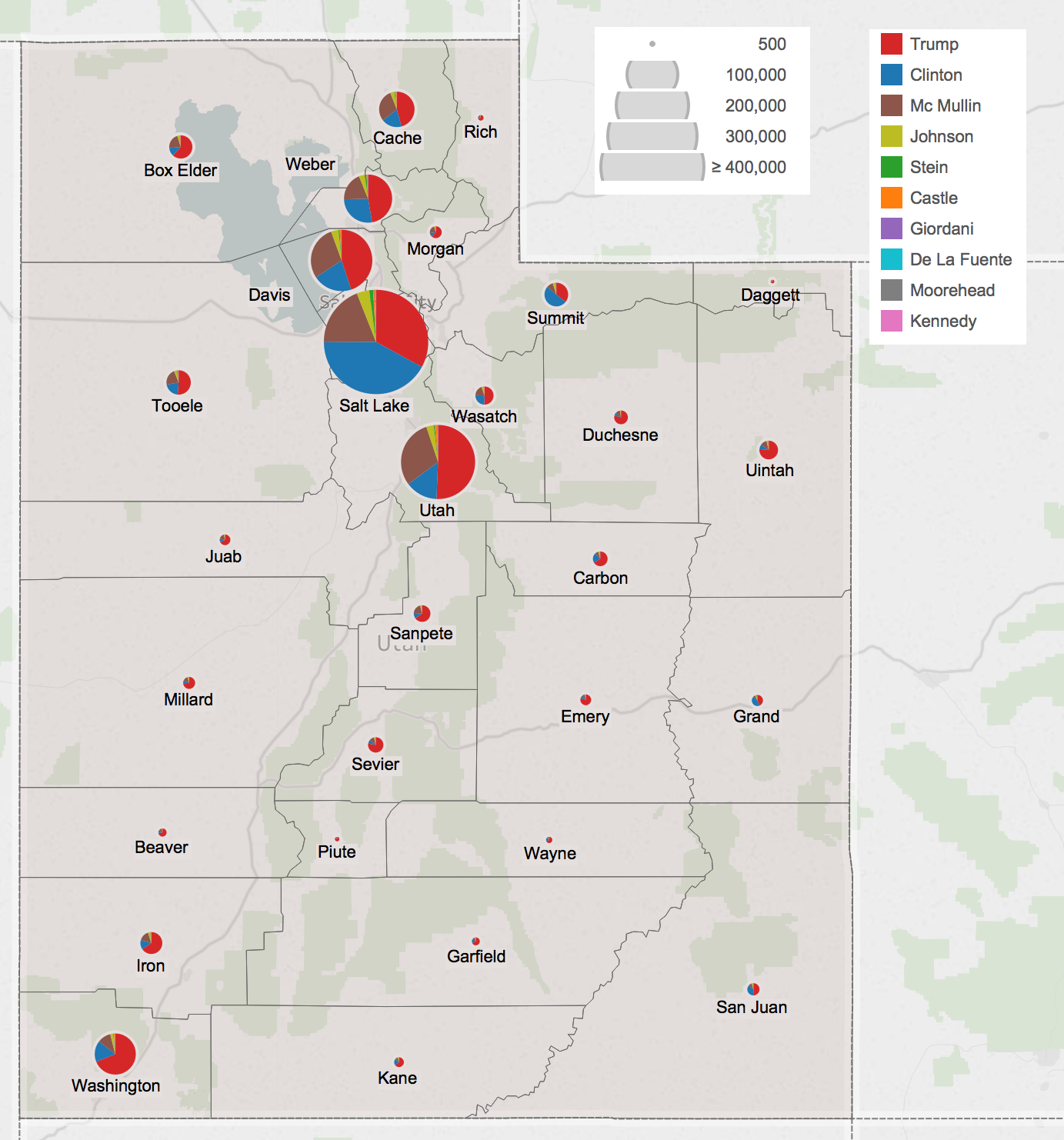
Results by county showing number of votes by size and candidates by color

Treemap of the popular vote by county

The 2016 United States presidential election in Utah was held on November 8, 2016, as part of the 2016 United States presidential election which was also held in the other 49 states and in the District of Columbia. Voters were asked to pick 6 electors to be pledged for a candidate in the Electoral College. The two main tickets of the election were the Republican one, consisting of businessman Donald Trump and Indiana Governor Mike Pence, and the Democratic one, consisting of former Secretary of State Hillary Clinton and Virginia Senator Tim Kaine.

On March 22, 2016, in the presidential primaries, Utah voters expressed their preferences for the Democratic and Republican parties' respective nominees for president. The state uses a system of semi-closed primaries, meaning that voters registered with a specific party can vote in that party's primary, while voters who are unaffiliated can vote in the primary of one party of their choosing. Trump won Utah with 45.5 percent of the vote, the lowest percentage for any Republican since George H. W. Bush in 1992 and the lowest winning percentage for any presidential candidate since both Bill Clinton and Bob Dole in 1996. Clinton received 27.5 percent of the vote, and Republican-turned-independent candidate Evan McMullin received 21.5 percent.

Trump's 18.08 point margin was the closest a Democrat has come to winning Utah since 1964, when Lyndon B. Johnson won by 9.73%. (Note: In 1992, George H. W. Bush won Utah by only 16.02 points; however, this was ahead of Ross Perot. Bill Clinton lost Utah by 18.71 points in that election.) Although he never lost the state, Trump never won over 60% of the vote in Utah in any of his three runs, greatly below all other 21st century Republican candidates.

This was due to McMullin's strong third-party showing limiting Trump to under 50% of the vote; Clinton received a smaller percentage of the popular vote than five other Democrats in this same time period (Barack Obama in 2008, Bill Clinton in 1996, Michael Dukakis in 1988, Jimmy Carter in 1976, and Hubert Humphrey in 1968). McMullin's 21.54% marks the last time in which a third-party candidate received more than 20% of the popular vote in a state during a presidential election.

This was one of only three states, the others being Idaho and Vermont, where the Libertarian Party candidate Gary Johnson did not obtain third place, as McMullin beat him in Idaho and Utah, and write-in votes for Bernie Sanders (who was no longer running for president) beat him in Vermont. Trump also became the first Republican to win the White House without carrying Salt Lake or Summit Counties since William McKinley in 1896 and 1900, respectively. The state was one of 12 (along with the District of Columbia) that shifted towards the Democrats in the 2016 election.

== Caucus elections ==
Utah held its presidential caucuses on March 22, 2016.

=== Democratic caucus ===
Four candidates appeared on the Democratic presidential caucus ballot:

- Hillary Clinton
- Bernie Sanders
- Martin O'Malley (withdrawn)

Utah Democratic caucuses, March 22, 2016
Candidate	Popular vote		Estimated delegates		
Candidate	Count	Percentage	Pledged	Unpledged	Total
Bernie Sanders	62,992	79.21%	27	2	29
Hillary Clinton	16,166	20.33%	6	2	8
Others	34	0.04%			
Uncommitted	334	0.42%	0	0	0
Total	79,526	100%	33	4	37

=== Republican caucus ===
Republican caucus results by county: Cruz: 30–40%; 40–50%; 50–60%; 60–70%; 70–80%

Three candidates appeared on the Republican presidential caucus ballot:

- Ted Cruz
- John Kasich
- Donald Trump

Utah Republican caucus, March 22, 2016
Candidate	Votes	Percentage	Actual delegate count		
Candidate	Votes	Percentage	Bound	Unbound	Total
Ted Cruz	132,904	69.46%	40	0	40
John Kasich	31,992	16.72%	0	0	0
Donald Trump	26,434	13.82%	0	0	0
Unprojected delegates:			0	0	0
Total:	191,330	100.00%	40	0	40
Source: The Green Papers

== General election ==
=== Voting history ===
The state of Utah has given its electoral votes to the Republican ticket in every election year since 1968 and only once voted for a Democratic candidate in elections since 1952 (in 1964). The state has a majority of members of the Church of Jesus Christ of Latter-day Saints (LDS Church) population, which on the national level voted 78 percent to 21 percent for Mitt Romney in 2012. This very heavily contributed to Mitt Romney winning the state by a margin of 73 percent to 25 percent in the 2012 election. However, Donald Trump's criticism of Romney's faith on the campaign trail in 2016 angered many Republican voters. Polls suggested that Utah might be a strong state for Libertarian candidate Gary Johnson as a protest vote against Trump. As a result, Larry Sabato's online election forecaster, Sabato's Crystal Ball, downgraded their rating of the Utah contest from "Safe Republican" to "Likely Republican" on June 23.

Evan McMullin, a conservative independent candidate, had also been viewed by voters in Utah as another alternative, given that it is also his home state. According to one poll released on October 12, Trump and Clinton were seen as virtually tied in Utah at 26%, with McMullin polling at 22%. McMullin's rise was the result of further Republican backlash against Trump following the release of a controversial video from 2005 showing Trump bragging about obscene sexual conduct with women. In a poll conducted by Emerson College from October 17–19 with a sample size of 700 people, McMullin placed first with 31 percent ahead of Trump by a 4 percent margin, who had 27 percent of support, while Clinton polled in third at 24 percent. This was the first conducted statewide opinion poll of the 2016 election where a third-party candidate has placed first.

Although Evan McMullin did not win a majority or a plurality of the vote in any county in Utah, he did win a plurality or a majority of the vote in several election precincts. Six election precincts in Utah cast a simple majority of their votes for Evan McMullin with four being in Utah County while one precinct in Cache County and Salt Lake County (Note: The Salt Lake County precinct only cast a single vote for any presidential candidate which was for McMullin.) cast a simple majority of the vote for McMullin.

=== Predictions ===
Source	Ranking	As of
Los Angeles Times	Likely R	November 6, 2016
CNN	Lean R	November 4, 2016
Cook Political Report	Lean R	November 7, 2016
Electoral-vote.com	Safe R	November 8, 2016
Rothenberg Political Report	Lean R	November 7, 2016
Sabato's Crystal Ball	Lean R	November 7, 2016
RealClearPolitics	Likely R	November 8, 2016
Fox News	Lean R	November 7, 2016

=== Polling ===
Donald Trump won almost every poll, except for one poll showing him tied with Hillary Clinton and Evan McMullin, and another showing McMullin with 31% of the vote, ahead of Trump's 27% and Clinton's 24%. The final RCP average showed Trump with 37% to Clinton's 27%, Evan McMullin's 25% and Gary Johnson with 3.5%.

=== Candidates on the ballot ===
The following candidates were listed on the ballot:

- Donald Trump & Mike Pence (Republican Party)
- Evan McMullin & Nathan Johnson (Not affiliated with any Party)
- Hillary Clinton & Tim Kaine (Democratic Party)
- Gary Johnson & William Weld (Libertarian Party)
- Darrell Castle & Scott N. Bradley (Constitution Party)
- Jill Stein & Ajamu Baraka (Green Party)
- Rocky De La Fuente & Michael Steinberg (Reform Party)
- Rocky Giordani & Farley Anderson (Independent American Party)
- Alyson Kennedy & Osborne Hart (Socialist Workers Party)
- Monica Moorehead & Lamont Lilly (Workers World Party)

=== Candidates not on the ballot ===
The following were certified by the state as "write-in candidates", which means that votes given to these persons would be counted:

- Stephen Paul Parks
- Mike Smith & Daniel White
- Laurence Kotlikoff & Edward Leamer
- Tom Hoefling & Steve Schulin
- David Limbaugh & Bo Gingrich
- Dustin Baird & Brandon Russell
- Andrew D. Basiago & Karen D. Kinnison
- Emidio Soltysik & Angela Nicole Walker
- Tony Valdivia & Aaron Roy Barriere
- Cherunda Fox & Roger Kushner
- Sheila "Samm" Tittle & R. Charles Casper-Kacprowicz
- Robert L. Buchanan & Jason A. Washington
- Marshall Schoenke & James Creighton Mitchell Jr.
- Janet Reid & John E. Reid
- Jamin Burton & Victor Neves

=== Results ===
2016 United States presidential election in Utah
Party	Candidate	Votes	%	±%
Republican	Donald Trump Mike Pence	515,231	45.54%	−27.08%
Democratic	Hillary Clinton Tim Kaine	310,676	27.46%	+2.77%
Independent	Evan McMullin Nathan Johnson	243,690	21.54%	N/A
Libertarian	Gary Johnson Bill Weld	39,608	3.50%	+2.27%
Green	Jill Stein Ajamu Baraka	9,438	0.83%	+0.46%
Constitution	Darrell Castle Scott Bradley	8,032	0.71%	+0.43%
Independent American	Rocky Giordani Farley Anderson	2,752	0.24%	N/A
Independent	Rocky De La Fuente Michael Steinberg	883	0.08%	N/A
Independent	Monica Moorehead Lamont Lilly	544	0.05%	N/A
Independent	Alyson Kennedy Osborne Hart	521	0.05%	N/A
Write-in		55	0.00%	
Total votes		1,131,430	100.00%	

==== By county ====
County	Donald Trump Republican		Hillary Clinton Democratic		Evan McMullin Unaffiliated		Gary Johnson Libertarian		Jill Stein Green		Darrell Castle Constitution		Other candidates Various parties		Margin		Total votes cast
County	#	%	#	%	#	%	#	%	#	%	#	%	#	%	#	%	Total votes cast
Beaver	1,838	73.37%	264	10.54%	323	12.89%	36	1.44%	10	0.40%	12	0.48%	22	0.88%	1,515 (Note: In counties where McMullin placed second, ahead of Clinton, the Margin given is Trump's vote and percentage minus McMullin's vote and percentage.)	60.48%	2,505
Box Elder	12,230	61.53%	2,282	11.48%	4,257	21.42%	591	2.97%	76	0.38%	210	1.06%	232	1.17%	7,973	40.11%	19,878
Cache	21,139	45.25%	8,563	18.33%	13,695	29.31%	1,630	3.49%	330	0.71%	669	1.43%	692	1.48%	7,444	15.94%	46,718
Carbon	5,275	65.95%	1,717	21.47%	615	7.69%	191	2.39%	41	0.51%	47	0.59%	113	1.42%	3,558	44.48%	7,999
Daggett	331	69.39%	77	16.14%	44	9.22%	17	3.56%	0	0.00%	4	0.84%	4	0.84%	254	53.25%	477
Davis	62,219	44.35%	28,776	20.51%	39,735	28.32%	5,390	3.84%	864	0.62%	883	0.63%	2,421	1.72%	22,484	16.03%	140,288
Duchesne	5,508	78.82%	500	7.16%	730	10.45%	107	1.53%	18	0.26%	68	0.97%	57	0.82%	4,778	68.37%	6,988
Emery	3,425	79.37%	380	8.81%	362	8.39%	71	1.65%	3	0.07%	15	0.35%	59	1.37%	3,045	70.56%	4,315
Garfield	1,606	67.96%	358	15.15%	286	12.10%	61	2.58%	16	0.68%	3	0.13%	33	1.39%	1,248	52.81%	2,363
Grand	1,975	42.93%	1,960	42.60%	281	6.11%	180	3.91%	109	2.37%	10	0.22%	86	1.87%	15	0.33%	4,601
Iron	11,561	64.84%	2,450	13.74%	2,752	15.43%	540	3.03%	102	0.57%	173	0.97%	253	1.41%	8,809	49.41%	17,831
Juab	2,827	66.97%	442	10.47%	762	18.05%	72	1.71%	14	0.33%	44	1.04%	60	1.42%	2,065	48.92%	4,221
Kane	2,265	64.02%	741	20.94%	352	9.95%	86	2.43%	31	0.88%	15	0.42%	48	1.35%	1,524	43.08%	3,538
Millard	3,860	73.26%	431	8.18%	719	13.65%	108	2.05%	6	0.11%	99	1.88%	46	0.86%	3,141	59.61%	5,269
Morgan	3,188	61.05%	577	11.05%	1,198	22.94%	142	2.72%	11	0.21%	68	1.30%	38	0.73%	1,990	38.11%	5,222
Piute	626	85.75%	47	6.44%	36	4.93%	11	1.51%	1	0.14%	5	0.68%	4	0.55%	579	79.31%	730
Rich	797	71.29%	104	9.30%	174	15.56%	21	1.88%	1	0.09%	10	0.89%	11	0.99%	623	55.73%	1,118
Salt Lake	138,043	32.58%	175,863	41.50%	79,880	18.85%	16,306	3.85%	4,965	1.17%	2,047	0.48%	6,639	1.57%	−37,820	−8.92%	423,743
San Juan	2,645	47.80%	2,042	36.90%	486	8.78%	165	2.98%	47	0.85%	45	0.81%	104	1.88%	603	10.90%	5,534
Sanpete	6,673	65.12%	1,061	10.35%	2,038	19.89%	186	1.82%	30	0.29%	139	1.36%	120	1.17%	4,635	45.23%	10,247
Sevier	6,740	77.52%	695	7.99%	916	10.53%	175	2.01%	29	0.33%	67	0.77%	73	0.84%	5,824	66.99%	8,695
Summit	7,333	35.11%	10,503	50.29%	1,786	8.55%	756	3.62%	170	0.81%	44	0.21%	293	1.40%	−3,170	−15.18%	20,885
Tooele	11,169	50.79%	4,573	20.79%	4,769	21.69%	783	3.56%	182	0.83%	191	0.87%	202	0.92%	6,400	29.10%	21,992
Uintah	9,810	76.26%	995	7.73%	1,496	11.63%	275	2.14%	43	0.33%	129	1.00%	116	0.90%	8,314	64.63%	12,864
Utah	102,182	50.18%	28,522	14.01%	60,532	29.72%	6,437	3.16%	1,030	0.51%	1,994	0.98%	2,945	1.44%	41,650	20.46%	203,642
Wasatch	6,115	49.85%	3,063	24.97%	2,315	18.87%	409	3.33%	70	0.57%	103	0.84%	191	1.56%	3,052	24.88%	12,266
Washington	42,650	68.38%	10,288	16.49%	6,565	10.53%	1,473	2.36%	290	0.46%	459	0.74%	646	1.04%	32,362	51.89%	62,371
Wayne	966	67.74%	271	19.00%	135	9.47%	18	1.26%	12	0.84%	14	0.98%	10	0.70%	695	48.74%	1,426
Weber	40,235	46.78%	23,131	26.89%	16,451	19.13%	3,371	3.92%	937	1.09%	465	0.54%	1,416	1.64%	17,104	19.89%	86,006
Totals	515,231	45.05%	310,676	27.16%	243,690	21.31%	39,608	3.46%	9,438	0.83%	8,032	0.70%	17,057	1.49%	204,555	17.89%	1,143,732

==== Counties that flipped from Republican to Democratic ====
- Salt Lake (largest city: Salt Lake City)
- Summit (largest city: Park City)

==== By congressional district ====
Trump won all four congressional districts.

District	Trump	Clinton	McMullin	Representative
1st	49.7%	22.4%	22.3%	Rob Bishop
2nd	46.0%	32.0%	16.9%	Chris Stewart
3rd	47.2%	23.3%	24.5%	Jason Chaffetz
4th	39.1%	32.4%	22.5%	Mia Love

== Analysis ==
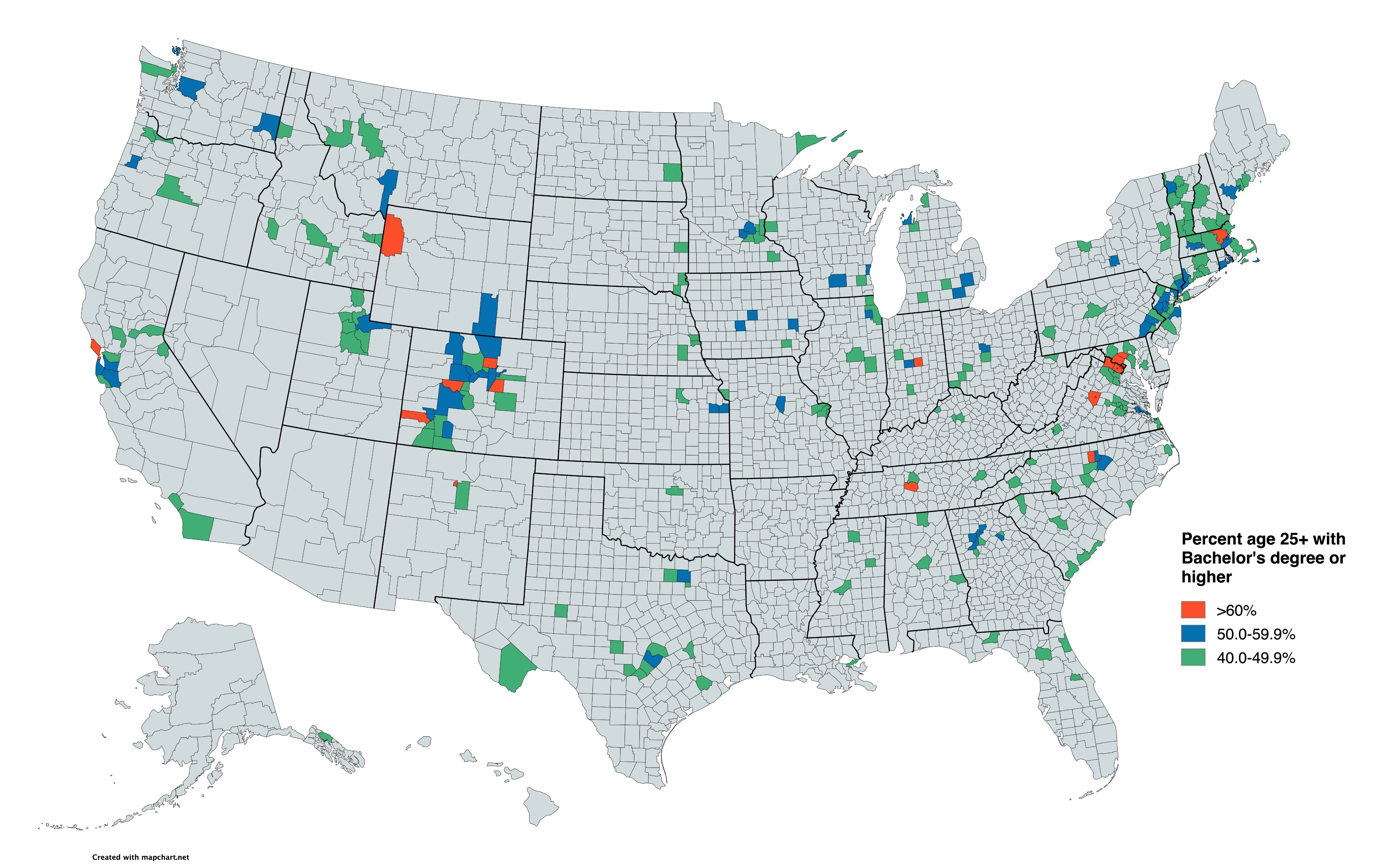
A map of the most college-educated counties in the United States

Utah had the largest swing to the left of any state in 2016, due to being one of the most highly educated states in the country and its majority-Mormon population being strongly negatively disposed to voting for Trump. Some of the largest leftward shifts in the country occurred in highly educated Salt Lake City metropolitan area counties (see the map), though most of them still voted for Trump by diminished margins. Although Trump won Utah in all three of his elections, he never won over 60% of the vote in any of them, greatly below those of prior Republican nominees.

Utah gave the Republican nominee a 45 percent plurality and thus awarded him six electoral votes. This was the lowest percent of the vote Trump received in any state that he won in 2016. Trump received a much lower percentage of the vote in Utah than did Mitt Romney in 2012. In particular, Trump underperformed Romney by over 30 percentage points in the Provo-Orem, Logan, and Ogden metropolitan areas. Meanwhile, Clinton improved on Obama's performance in all of these areas. Trump received only 45 percent of the vote among Utah members of the LDS Church, barely half the proportion that Romney won in 2012. This was also much lower than the 61 percent of the LDS Church's vote Trump received nationally.

McMullin's 21.3 percent of the vote is the strongest third-party performance in any state since Ross Perot during the 1992 presidential election. (Note: Perot exceeded McMullin's Utah performance in twenty-six of the fifty states in 1992, with his best performance being 30.44 percent in Maine.) He finished second ahead of Clinton in fifteen of Utah's twenty-nine counties, becoming the first third-party candidate since Perot to outpoll a major party candidate in any county nationwide, and only the fifth since 1928 to do so in any non-Southern county. (Note: The other four were William Lemke in the North Dakota counties of Burke, Divide, Williams, Mountrail and Towner in 1936, George Wallace in Utah's own Kane County in 1968, John G. Schmitz in the four Idaho counties of Fremont, Jefferson, Lemhi and Madison in 1972, and Perot in numerous counties in 1992 and a few in 1996.) In Utah County, he received almost thirty percent of the vote, about twice as much as Clinton and more than any non-Republican presidential candidate since 1968. Had McMullin won Utah, he would have become the first nationally nonpartisan candidate since George Washington to win a state in 224 years since Washington's reelection in 1792, (Note: Robert Marion La Follette senior in 1924 did win his home state of Wisconsin under an "Independent" banner, and exceeded McMullin's performance under a similar "Independent" banner in Minnesota, South Dakota, Nevada and Oregon. In 1912, Theodore Roosevelt also exceeded McMullin's vote share under the "Independent" banner in Kansas, as did James B. Weaver in South Dakota in 1892.) and ultimately the first nonpartisan candidate to win a state west of the Mississippi River. Due to McMullin's strong showing, Trump's margin of victory in Utah marked a leftward swing by 29.85%, the strongest such swing in 2016.

As of the 2024 election, this is the most recent election where Grand County voted Republican.

== See also ==
- United States presidential elections in Utah
- First presidency of Donald Trump
- 2016 Democratic Party presidential debates and forums
- 2016 Democratic Party presidential primaries
- 2016 Republican Party presidential debates and forums
- 2016 Republican Party presidential primaries
