= 2016 United States presidential election in New Jersey =

- November 8, 2016
- Turnout: 68.13% (▲1.22%)

Nominee	Hillary Clinton	Donald Trump
Party	Democratic	Republican
Home state	New York	New York
Running mate	Tim Kaine	Mike Pence
Electoral vote	14	0
Popular vote	2,148,278	1,601,933
Percentage	55.45%	41.35%

Clinton
40–50%
50–60%
60–70%
70–80%
80–90%
90–100%
Trump
40–50%
50–60%
60–70%
70–80%
Tie/No Data
President before election
Barack Obama
Democratic
Elected President
Donald Trump
Republican

Treemap of the popular vote by county

The 2016 United States presidential election in New Jersey was held on Tuesday, November 8, 2016, as part of the 2016 United States presidential election in which all 50 states plus the District of Columbia participated. New Jersey voters chose electors to represent them in the Electoral College via a popular vote, pitting the Republican nominee, businessman Donald Trump, and running mate Indiana Governor Mike Pence against Democratic nominee, former Secretary of State Hillary Clinton, and her running mate Virginia Senator Tim Kaine. New Jersey has 14 electoral votes in the Electoral College.

Clinton won the state with 55.5% of the vote over Trump's 41.35%, or a 14-point margin. Despite her victory in the state, Clinton's vote share was slightly poorer than the vote shares President Barack Obama got from the state in 2008 and 2012. This was the first time since 1976 that New Jersey did not vote for the same candidate as neighboring Pennsylvania, and the first time since 1932 that New Jersey voted Democratic while Pennsylvania voted Republican. Donald Trump became the first Republican to win the White House without carrying Somerset County since Benjamin Harrison in 1888.

== Primary elections ==
New Jersey's presidential primaries were on June 7, 2016, with the Democratic, Republican, and Libertarian parties participating. Registered members of each party could only vote in their party's primary, while voters who were unaffiliated could choose any 1 primary in which to vote.

=== Democratic primary ===
Two candidates appeared on the Democratic presidential primary ballot:

- Bernie Sanders
- Hillary Clinton

New Jersey Democratic primary, June 7, 2016
Candidate	Popular vote		Estimated delegates		
Candidate	Count	Percentage	Pledged	Unpledged	Total
Hillary Clinton	566,247	63.32%	79	12	91
Bernie Sanders	328,058	36.68%	47	2	49
Uncommitted	—N/a		0	0	0
Total	894,305	100%	126	16	142

=== Republican primary ===
Republican primary results by county: Donald Trump: 70–80%; 80–90%

3 candidates appeared on the Republican presidential primary ballot:

- Ted Cruz (withdrawn prior to primary)
- John Kasich (withdrawn prior to primary)
- Donald Trump

New Jersey Republican primary, June 7, 2016
Candidate	Votes	Percentage	Actual delegate count		
Candidate	Votes	Percentage	Bound	Unbound	Total
Donald Trump	360,212	80.41%	51	0	51
John Kasich (withdrawn)	59,866	13.36%	0	0	0
Ted Cruz (withdrawn)	27,874	6.22%	0	0	0
Unprojected delegates:			0	0	0
Total:	447,952	100.00%	51	0	51
Source: The Green Papers

== General election ==
=== Predictions ===
Source	Ranking	As of
Los Angeles Times	Safe D	November 6, 2016
CNN	Safe D	November 4, 2016
Cook Political Report	Safe D	November 7, 2016
Electoral-vote.com	Safe D	November 8, 2016
Rothenberg Political Report	Safe D	November 7, 2016
Sabato's Crystal Ball	Safe D	November 7, 2016
RealClearPolitics	Likely D	November 8, 2016
Fox News	Safe D	November 7, 2016

=== Candidate ballot access ===
- Hillary Clinton/Tim Kaine, Democratic
- Donald Trump/Mike Pence, Republican
- Darrell L. Castle/Scott N. Bradley, Constitution
- Rocky De La Fuente/Michael Steinberg, American Delta Party
- Gary Johnson/Bill Weld, Libertarian
- Alyson Kennedy/Osborne Hart, Socialist Workers Party
- Gloria La Riva/Eugene Puryear, Socialism and Liberation
- Monica Moorehead/Lamont Lilly, Workers World Party
- Jill Stein/Ajamu Baraka, Green Party

=== Results ===
Vote share by Legislative district Trump: 40–50%; 50–60%; 60–70%; Clinton: 40–50%; 50–60%; 60–70%; 70–80%; 80–90%

2016 United States presidential election in New Jersey
Party	Candidate	Votes	%	±%
Democratic	Hillary Clinton	2,148,278	55.45%	
Republican	Donald Trump	1,601,933	41.35%	
Libertarian	Gary Johnson	72,477	1.87%	
Green	Jill Stein	37,772	0.98%	
Constitution	Darrell L. Castle	6,161	0.16%	
Socialist Workers	Alyson Kennedy	2,156	0.06%	
American Delta Party	Rocky De La Fuente	1,838	0.05%	
Workers World	Monica Moorehead	1,749	0.05%	
Socialism and Liberation	Gloria La Riva	1,682	0.04%	
Majority		546,345	14.10%	
Turnout		3,874,046		

==== By county ====
County	Hillary Clinton Democratic		Donald Trump Republican		Various candidates Other parties		Margin		Total votes cast
County	#	%	#	%	#	%	#	%	Total votes cast
Atlantic	60,924	51.61%	52,690	44.64%	4,427	3.75%	8,234	6.97%	118,041
Bergen	231,211	54.76%	175,529	41.57%	15,473	3.67%	55,682	13.19%	422,213
Burlington	121,725	55.01%	89,272	40.34%	10,286	4.65%	32,453	14.67%	221,283
Camden	146,717	64.06%	72,631	31.71%	9,699	4.23%	74,086	32.35%	229,047
Cape May	18,750	38.07%	28,446	57.75%	2,061	4.18%	-9,696	-19.68%	49,257
Cumberland	27,771	51.11%	24,453	45.01%	2,107	3.88%	3,318	6.10%	54,331
Essex	240,837	76.97%	63,176	20.19%	8,871	2.84%	177,661	56.78%	312,884
Gloucester	66,870	47.34%	67,544	47.82%	6,840	4.84%	-674	-0.48%	141,254
Hudson	163,917	74.32%	49,043	22.24%	7,582	3.44%	114,874	52.08%	220,542
Hunterdon	28,898	40.33%	38,712	54.02%	4,050	5.65%	-9,814	-13.69%	71,660
Mercer	104,775	66.29%	46,193	29.23%	7,090	4.48%	58,582	37.06%	158,058
Middlesex	193,044	58.76%	122,953	37.42%	12,560	3.82%	70,091	21.34%	328,557
Monmouth	137,181	43.17%	166,723	52.47%	13,846	4.36%	-29,542	-9.30%	317,750
Morris	115,249	45.46%	126,071	49.72%	12,217	4.82%	-10,822	-4.26%	253,537
Ocean	87,150	31.49%	179,079	64.71%	10,496	3.80%	-91,929	-33.22%	276,725
Passaic	116,759	59.50%	72,902	37.15%	6,567	3.35%	43,857	22.35%	196,228
Salem	11,904	39.88%	16,381	54.87%	1,568	5.25%	-4,477	-14.99%	29,853
Somerset	85,689	54.55%	65,505	41.70%	5,898	3.75%	20,184	12.85%	157,092
Sussex	24,212	32.21%	46,658	62.08%	4,288	5.71%	-22,446	-29.87%	75,158
Union	147,414	65.94%	68,114	30.47%	8,042	3.59%	79,300	35.47%	223,570
Warren	17,281	34.78%	29,858	60.10%	2,544	5.12%	-12,577	-25.32%	49,683
Totals	2,148,278	54.99%	1,601,933	41.00%	156,512	4.01%	546,345	13.99%	3,906,723

Counties that flipped from Democratic to Republican

- Gloucester (largest municipality: Washington Township)
- Salem (largest city: Salem)

==== By congressional district ====
Clinton won seven of 12 congressional districts. Trump and Clinton each won a district held by the other party.

District	Clinton	Trump	Representative
1st	61%	36%	Donald Norcross
2nd	46%	51%	Frank LoBiondo
3rd	45%	51%	Tom MacArthur
4th	41%	56%	Chris Smith
5th	48%	49%	Scott Garrett
5th	48%	49%	Josh Gottheimer
6th	56%	41%	Frank Pallone Jr.
7th	49%	47%	Leonard Lance
8th	76%	21%	Albio Sires
9th	64%	33%	Bill Pascrell
10th	85%	13%	Donald Payne Jr.
11th	48%	49%	Rodney Frelinghuysen
12th	65%	32%	Bonnie Watson Coleman

== Analysis ==
Hillary Clinton's 55.5% of the vote was 2.9% less than Barack Obama's win in the state in 2012. Overall, the trend from 2012 to 2016 was that suburban areas of central and northern New Jersey voted more Democratic, while the shore and southern New Jersey voted more Republican. Clinton's most notable improvements over Obama in 2012 were seen in Union, Somerset, and Morris Counties. In Morris, Clinton came within 5% of winning the county, which had not voted for a Democratic presidential candidate since 1964, and would later vote Democratic in 2020. Clinton's stronger performance in the suburban towns of north-central New Jersey, such as Summit, Westfield, and Bridgewater, helped her narrowly win the 7th congressional district.

On the other hand, southern New Jersey, especially Cumberland County and Salem County, voted significantly more Republican than they had in 2012. For example, even though Cumberland County voted Democratic in both 2012 and 2016, Clinton won it by just 6%, whereas Obama won it by nearly 24% in 2012. Meanwhile, Trump flipped Salem County after Obama won it in 2012, and he also was the first Republican to win Gloucester County since 1988. Additionally, the four shore counties of Monmouth, Ocean, Atlantic, and Cape May all voted more Republican than they had in 2012, as Mitt Romney had won these four counties collectively by around 6% in 2012, but Trump won them by 17% in 2016.

== See also ==
- United States presidential elections in New Jersey
- First presidency of Donald Trump
- 2016 Democratic Party presidential primaries
- 2016 Republican Party presidential primaries
- Statewide opinion polling for the 2016 United States presidential election in New Jersey
