= 1996 United States presidential election in Washington (state) =

- November 5, 1996
- Turnout: 74.52% ▼8.08%

Nominee	Bill Clinton	Bob Dole	Ross Perot
Party	Democratic	Republican	Reform
Home state	Arkansas	Kansas	Texas
Running mate	Al Gore	Jack Kemp	Pat Choate
Electoral vote	11	0	0
Popular vote	1,123,323	840,712	201,003
Percentage	49.84%	37.30%	8.92%

Clinton
40–50%
50–60%
60–70%
Dole
40–50%
50–60%
President before election
Bill Clinton
Democratic
Elected President
Bill Clinton
Democratic

The 1996 United States presidential election in Washington took place on November 5, 1996, as part of the 1996 United States presidential election. Voters chose 11 representatives, or electors to the Electoral College, who voted for president and vice president.

The State of Washington was won by President Bill Clinton (D–AR) over Senator Bob Dole (R–KS), with Clinton winning 49.84% to 37.30% for a margin of 12.54%. Billionaire businessman Ross Perot (Reform–TX) finished in third, with 8.92% of the popular vote. As of the 2024 presidential election, this is the last election in which Spokane County, Kittitas County, Pend Oreille County, Ferry County, and Asotin County voted for a Democratic presidential candidate. Okanogon County voted against the winner of the election for the first time since 1900.

== Results ==
1996 United States presidential election in Washington
Party	Candidate	Votes	%	±%
Democratic	Bill Clinton Al Gore	1,123,323	49.84%	+6.43%
Republican	Bob Dole Jack Kemp	840,712	37.30%	+5.33%
Reform	Ross Perot Patrick Choate	201,003	8.92%	N/A
Independent	Ralph Nader Winona LaDuke	60,322	2.68%	N/A
Libertarian	Harry Browne Jo Jorgensen	12,522	0.56%	+0.23%
Natural Law	John Hagelin Mike Tompkins	6,076	0.27%	+0.16%
U.S. Taxpayers'	Howard Phillips Herbert Titus	4,578	0.20%	+0.10%
Independent	Charles Collins Rosemary Giumarra	2,374	0.11%	N/A
Workers World	Monica Moorehead Gloria La Riva	2,189	0.10%	N/A
Socialist Workers	James Harris Laura Garza	738	0.03%	+0.01%
Total votes		2,253,837	100.00%	N/A

=== By county ===
County	Bill Clinton Democratic		Bob Dole Republican		Ross Perot Reform		Various candidates Other parties		Margin		Total votes cast
County	#	%	#	%	#	%	#	%	#	%	Total votes cast
Adams	1,740	37.71%	2,356	51.06%	448	9.71%	70	1.52%	-616	-13.35%	4,614
Asotin	3,349	45.81%	2,860	39.12%	936	12.80%	166	2.27%	489	6.69%	7,311
Benton	20,783	38.63%	26,664	49.56%	5,311	9.87%	1,045	1.94%	-5,881	-10.93%	53,803
Chelan	8,595	36.01%	12,363	51.79%	2,332	9.77%	580	2.43%	-3,768	-15.79%	23,870
Clallam	12,585	42.64%	12,432	42.12%	3,187	10.80%	1,312	4.45%	153	0.52%	29,516
Clark	52,254	46.35%	46,794	41.51%	9,663	8.57%	4,019	3.57%	5,460	4.84%	112,730
Columbia	743	38.01%	948	48.49%	228	11.66%	36	1.84%	-205	-10.49%	1,955
Cowlitz	18,054	53.87%	11,221	33.48%	3,441	10.27%	799	2.38%	6,833	20.39%	33,515
Douglas	3,913	35.82%	5,682	52.01%	1,132	10.36%	198	1.81%	-1,769	-16.19%	10,925
Ferry	1,197	42.49%	1,091	38.73%	408	14.48%	121	4.30%	106	3.76%	2,817
Franklin	4,961	41.01%	5,946	49.16%	992	8.20%	197	1.63%	-985	-8.14%	12,096
Garfield	497	39.60%	623	49.64%	117	9.32%	18	1.43%	-126	-10.04%	1,255
Grant	8,065	36.88%	10,895	49.83%	2,496	11.41%	410	1.88%	-2,830	-12.94%	21,866
Grays Harbor	14,082	53.65%	7,635	29.09%	3,757	14.31%	776	2.96%	6,447	24.56%	26,250
Island	12,157	42.71%	12,387	43.52%	2,787	9.79%	1,133	3.98%	-230	-0.81%	28,464
Jefferson	7,145	50.61%	4,607	32.63%	1,385	9.81%	982	6.96%	2,538	17.98%	14,119
King	417,846	56.38%	232,811	31.41%	51,309	6.92%	39,138	5.28%	185,035	24.97%	741,104
Kitsap	44,167	48.28%	35,304	38.59%	8,769	9.58%	3,247	3.55%	8,863	9.69%	91,487
Kittitas	5,707	45.42%	5,224	41.58%	1,214	9.66%	419	3.33%	483	3.84%	12,564
Klickitat	3,214	45.58%	2,662	37.75%	875	12.41%	301	4.27%	552	7.83%	7,052
Lewis	10,331	37.37%	13,238	47.89%	3,373	12.20%	702	2.54%	-2,907	-10.52%	27,644
Lincoln	1,806	35.88%	2,587	51.40%	518	10.29%	122	2.42%	-781	-15.52%	5,033
Mason	10,088	48.62%	7,149	34.45%	2,816	13.57%	697	3.36%	2,939	14.16%	20,750
Okanogan	4,810	36.79%	5,890	45.05%	1,797	13.74%	578	4.42%	-1,080	-8.26%	13,075
Pacific	5,095	55.92%	2,598	28.51%	1,131	12.41%	287	3.15%	2,497	27.41%	9,111
Pend Oreille	2,126	42.55%	2,012	40.27%	709	14.19%	149	2.98%	114	2.28%	4,996
Pierce	120,893	50.57%	89,295	37.35%	22,051	9.22%	6,834	2.86%	31,598	13.22%	239,073
San Juan	3,663	49.81%	2,523	34.31%	508	6.91%	660	8.97%	1,140	15.50%	7,354
Skagit	18,295	44.49%	16,397	39.88%	4,818	11.72%	1,608	3.91%	1,898	4.62%	41,118
Skamania	1,724	45.50%	1,387	36.61%	450	11.88%	228	6.02%	337	8.89%	3,789
Snohomish	109,624	49.61%	81,885	37.06%	22,731	10.29%	6,720	3.04%	27,739	12.55%	220,960
Spokane	71,727	45.05%	66,628	41.84%	16,532	10.38%	4,345	2.73%	5,099	3.20%	159,232
Stevens	5,591	34.90%	7,524	46.96%	2,158	13.47%	749	4.67%	-1,933	-12.06%	16,022
Thurston	45,522	52.16%	29,835	34.18%	7,622	8.73%	4,301	4.93%	15,687	17.97%	87,280
Wahkiakum	924	50.33%	619	33.71%	215	11.71%	78	4.25%	305	16.61%	1,836
Walla Walla	8,038	41.25%	9,085	46.62%	1,894	9.72%	469	2.41%	-1,047	-5.37%	19,486
Whatcom	29,074	45.07%	27,153	42.09%	4,854	7.52%	3,429	5.32%	1,921	2.98%	64,510
Whitman	7,262	45.69%	6,734	42.37%	1,315	8.27%	584	3.67%	528	3.32%	15,895
Yakima	25,676	43.25%	27,668	46.61%	4,724	7.96%	1,292	2.18%	-1,992	-3.36%	59,360
Totals	1,123,323	49.84%	840,712	37.30%	201,003	8.92%	88,799	3.94%	282,611	12.54%	2,253,837

==== Counties that flipped from Democratic to Republican ====
- Island
- Okanogan

County Flips: Democratic Hold / Republican Hold Flip

=== By congressional district ===
Clinton won eight of nine congressional districts, including five that elected Republicans.

District	Clinton	Dole	Perot	Representative
1st	51%	37%	8%	Rick White
2nd	47%	39%	10%	Jack Metcalf
3rd	49%	38%	10%	Linda Smith
4th	40%	48%	10%	Doc Hastings
5th	44%	43%	11%	George Nethercutt
6th	50%	36%	10%	Norm Dicks
7th	67%	20%	5%	Jim McDermott
8th	47%	41%	9%	Jennifer Dunn
9th	51%	36%	10%	Randy Tate (104th Congress)
9th	51%	36%	10%	Adam Smith (105th Congress)

== See also ==
- United States presidential elections in Washington (state)
- Presidency of Bill Clinton
