= 2000 United States presidential election in Washington (state) =

- November 7, 2000
- Turnout: 75.46% (▲0.94 pp)

Nominee	Al Gore	George W. Bush
Party	Democratic	Republican
Home state	Tennessee	Texas
Running mate	Joe Lieberman	Dick Cheney
Electoral vote	11	0
Popular vote	1,247,652	1,108,864
Percentage	50.16%	44.58%

Gore
40–50%
50–60%
60–70%
70–80%
Bush
40–50%
50–60%
60–70%
70–80%
President before election
Bill Clinton
Democratic
Elected President
George W. Bush
Republican

The 2000 United States presidential election in Washington took place on November 7, 2000, and was part of the 2000 United States presidential election. Voters chose 11 representatives, or electors to the Electoral College, who voted for president and vice president.

The State of Washington was considered a competitive swing state in 2000, and both campaigns sent advertisements into the state. On election day, Gore won the state with a margin of 5.6%. Gore's best performance in the state was in King County, also the largest populated county, which he won with 60% of the vote. As of the 2024 presidential election, this is the last election in which Whatcom County voted for the Republican candidate.

== General election ==
=== Polling ===
Poll source	Date(s)	Sample size	Margin of error	George W. Bush (R)	Al Gore (D)	Ralph Nader (G)	Other / undecided (Note: Calculated by taking the difference of 100% and all other listed candidates combined. For polls that do not report a figure for Nader, this includes his support.)
Rasmussen Reports	November 5, 2000	909	—	44%	43%	—	13%
Zogby Analytics	November 5, 2000	504	—	43%	50%	5%	2%
Harris Insights & Analytics	November 3, 2000	6,549	—	47%	46%	5%	2%
Zogby Analytics	November 2, 2000	500	—	43%	46%	7%	4%
SurveyUSA	November 1, 2000	500	—	44%	46%	8%	2%
Zogby Analytics	October 30, 2000	500	—	43%	45%	6%	6%
Zogby Analytics	October 27, 2000	500	—	43%	46%	6%	5%
EMC Research (D) (Note: Poll conducted for an unspecified Democratic sponsor.)	October 21, 2000	500	—	38%	44%	4%	14%
Elway Research	October 19, 2000	400 (RV)	—	37%	46%	3%	14%

=== Results ===
2000 United States presidential election in Washington
Party	Candidate	Votes	%	±%
Democratic	Al Gore Joe Lieberman	1,247,652	50.16%	+0.32%
Republican	George W. Bush Dick Cheney	1,108,864	44.58%	+7.28%
Green	Ralph Nader Winona LaDuke	103,002	4.14%	N/A
Libertarian	Harry Browne Art Olivier	13,135	0.53%	−0.03%
Reform	Pat Buchanan Ezola Foster	7,171	0.29%	−8.63%
Natural Law	John Hagelin Nat Goldhaber	2,927	0.12%	−0.15%
Constitution	Howard Phillips Curtis Frazier	1,989	0.08%	−0.12%
Workers World	Monica Moorehead Gloria La Riva	1,729	0.07%	−0.03%
Socialist	David McReynolds Mary Cal Hollis	660	0.03%	N/A
Socialist Workers	James Harris Margaret Trowe	304	0.01%	−0.02%
Total votes		2,487,433	100.00%	N/A

==== By county ====
County	Al Gore Democratic		George W. Bush Republican		Other candidates Various parties		Margin		Total
County	#	%	#	%	#	%	#	%	Total
Adams	1,406	28.27%	3,440	69.16%	128	2.57%	-2,034	-40.89%	4,974
Asotin	2,736	34.26%	4,909	61.48%	340	4.26%	-2,173	-27.21%	7,985
Benton	19,512	32.64%	38,367	64.18%	1,900	3.18%	-18,855	-31.54%	59,779
Chelan	8,412	31.72%	16,980	64.03%	1,125	4.24%	-8,568	-32.31%	26,517
Clallam	13,779	42.75%	16,251	50.42%	2,202	6.83%	-2,472	-7.67%	32,232
Clark	61,767	45.57%	67,219	49.59%	6,558	4.84%	-5,452	-4.02%	135,544
Columbia	515	24.44%	1,523	72.28%	69	3.27%	-1,008	-47.84%	2,107
Cowlitz	18,233	49.33%	16,873	45.65%	1,856	5.02%	1,360	3.68%	36,962
Douglas	3,822	29.73%	8,512	66.22%	521	4.05%	-4,690	-36.48%	12,855
Ferry	932	30.68%	1,896	62.41%	210	6.91%	-964	-31.73%	3,038
Franklin	4,653	34.18%	8,594	63.13%	367	2.70%	-3,941	-28.95%	13,614
Garfield	300	22.57%	982	73.89%	47	3.54%	-682	-51.32%	1,329
Grant	7,073	29.72%	15,830	66.52%	895	3.76%	-8,757	-36.80%	23,798
Grays Harbor	13,304	51.22%	11,225	43.22%	1,443	5.56%	2,079	8.00%	25,972
Island	14,778	44.78%	16,408	49.72%	1,818	5.51%	-1,630	-4.94%	33,004
Jefferson	8,281	52.30%	6,095	38.50%	1,457	9.20%	2,186	13.81%	15,833
King	476,700	60.02%	273,171	34.40%	44,325	5.58%	203,529	25.63%	794,196
Kitsap	50,302	49.03%	46,427	45.25%	5,867	5.72%	3,875	3.78%	102,596
Kittitas	5,516	39.16%	7,727	54.86%	843	5.98%	-2,211	-15.70%	14,086
Klickitat	3,062	37.53%	4,557	55.85%	540	6.62%	-1,495	-18.32%	8,159
Lewis	9,891	32.99%	18,565	61.91%	1,530	5.10%	-8,674	-28.93%	29,986
Lincoln	1,417	27.27%	3,546	68.23%	234	4.50%	-2,129	-40.97%	5,197
Mason	10,876	48.38%	10,257	45.63%	1,347	5.99%	619	2.75%	22,480
Okanogan	4,335	29.29%	9,384	63.41%	1,079	7.29%	-5,049	-34.12%	14,798
Pacific	4,895	51.42%	4,042	42.46%	582	6.11%	853	8.96%	9,519
Pend Oreille	1,973	36.28%	3,076	56.56%	389	7.15%	-1,103	-20.28%	5,438
Pierce	138,249	51.50%	118,431	44.12%	11,747	4.38%	19,818	7.38%	268,427
San Juan	4,426	52.65%	3,005	35.74%	976	11.61%	1,421	16.90%	8,407
Skagit	20,432	45.18%	22,163	49.01%	2,626	5.81%	-1,731	-3.83%	45,221
Skamania	1,753	41.26%	2,151	50.62%	345	8.12%	-398	-9.37%	4,249
Snohomish	129,612	51.65%	109,615	43.68%	11,740	4.68%	19,997	7.97%	250,967
Spokane	74,604	43.35%	89,299	51.88%	8,209	4.77%	-14,695	-8.54%	172,112
Stevens	5,560	30.89%	11,299	62.78%	1,140	6.33%	-5,739	-31.89%	17,999
Thurston	50,467	51.80%	39,924	40.98%	7,031	7.22%	10,543	10.82%	97,422
Wahkiakum	803	40.70%	1,033	52.36%	137	6.94%	-230	-11.66%	1,973
Walla Walla	7,188	33.64%	13,304	62.27%	873	4.09%	-6,116	-28.63%	21,365
Whatcom	34,033	46.14%	34,287	46.49%	5,437	7.37%	-254	-0.34%	73,757
Whitman	6,509	40.09%	9,003	55.45%	725	4.47%	-2,494	-15.36%	16,237
Yakima	25,546	37.96%	39,494	58.68%	2,259	3.36%	-13,948	-20.73%	67,299
Totals	1,247,652	50.16%	1,108,864	44.58%	130,917	5.26%	138,788	5.58%	2,487,433

===== Counties that flipped from Democratic to Republican =====
- Asotin (Largest city: Clarkston)
- Clallam (Largest city: Port Angeles)
- Clark (Largest city: Vancouver)
- Ferry (Largest city: Republic)
- Kittitas (Largest city: Ellensburg)
- Klickitat (Largest city: Goldendale)
- Pend Oreille (Largest city: Newport)
- Skagit (Largest city: Mount Vernon)
- Skamania (Largest city: Carson)
- Spokane (Largest city: Spokane)
- Wahkiakum (Largest city: Puget Island)
- Whatcom (Largest city: Bellingham)
- Whitman (Largest city: Pullman)

==== By congressional district ====
Gore won six of nine congressional districts. Each candidate won a district that elected a representative of the other party.

District	Gore	Bush	Representative
1st	54%	42%	Jay Inslee
2nd	48%	46%	Jack Metcalf
2nd	48%	46%	Rick Larsen
3rd	47%	48%	Brian Baird
4th	34%	62%	Doc Hastings
5th	40%	55%	George Nethercutt
6th	51%	43%	Norm Dicks
7th	72%	20%	Jim McDermott
8th	49%	47%	Jennifer Dunn
9th	53%	42%	Adam Smith

== Electors ==
- Rachel Lake
- Debbie Aldrich
- Paul Steinberg
- Carol Sue Perkins
- Tim Hattenburg
- Debbie Regala
- Vic Battson
- Carl Schwartz
- Nancy McGinnis
- Jim Frush
- Charlotte Coker

== See also ==
- United States presidential elections in Washington (state)
- Presidency of George W. Bush
