= 1996 United States presidential election in Wisconsin =

- November 5, 1996

Nominee	Bill Clinton	Bob Dole	Ross Perot
Party	Democratic	Republican	Reform
Home state	Arkansas	Kansas	Texas
Running mate	Al Gore	Jack Kemp	Pat Choate
Electoral vote	11	0	0
Popular vote	1,071,971	845,029	227,339
Percentage	48.81%	38.48%	10.35%

Clinton
30–40%
40–50%
50–60%
60–70%
70–80%
80–90%
90–100%
Dole
30–40%
40–50%
50–60%
60–70%
70–80%
80–90%
90–100%
Tie/No Data
President before election
Bill Clinton
Democratic
Elected President
Bill Clinton
Democratic

The 1996 United States presidential election in Wisconsin took place on November 5, 1996, as part of the 1996 United States presidential election. Voters chose 11 representatives, or electors to the Electoral College, who voted for president and vice president.

Wisconsin was won by President Bill Clinton (D) over Senator Bob Dole (R-KS), with Clinton winning by 48.81% to 38.48%, or a margin of 10.33%. Billionaire businessman Ross Perot (Reform Party-TX) finished in third, with 10.35% of the popular vote.

As of the 2024 presidential election, this is the last election in which the following counties have voted for a Democratic presidential candidate: Polk, St. Croix, Sheboygan, and Taylor.

== Primaries ==
While Wisconsin typically held its presidential primaries and spring general elections in early April, the 1996 primaries and spring general election were instead held on March 19. In March 1995, Governor Tommy Thompson had signed into law a bill that shifted both the 1996 spring general election and the state's presidential primaries from April 2 to March 19 in order to align its primary with the Illinois, Michigan, and Ohio primaries held on that day. This was done in hopes that Wisconsin can join these fellow Midwestern states in a so-called "Big Ten primary" held shortly-following the southern Super Tuesday in the major party primary calendars. Similar bills had been proposed to move the Minnesota and Pennsylvania to March 19, though these did not pass.

=== Republican ===
Senator Bob Dole, the Republican front-runner, won all 36 pledged delegates available in the state's Republican primary. Dole had received Governor Thompson's endorsement ahead of the primary.

However, despite only appearing once in Wisconsin during his campaign, Pat Buchanan received more support in the Wisconsin primary than he had in any preceding primary.

== General election results ==
1996 United States presidential election in Wisconsin
Party	Candidate	Running mate	Votes	Percentage	Electoral votes
Democratic	Bill Clinton (incumbent)	Al Gore (incumbent)	1,071,971	48.81%	11
Republican	Bob Dole	Jack Kemp	845,029	38.48%	0
Reform	Ross Perot	Patrick Choate	227,339	10.35%	0
Independent	Ralph Nader	Winona LaDuke	28,723	1.31%	0
U.S. Taxpayers' Party	Howard Phillips	Herbert Titus	8,811	0.40%	0
Libertarian	Harry Browne	Jo Jorgensen	7,929	0.36%	0
No party	Write-ins		2,324	0.11%	0
Independent	John Hagelin	Mike Tompkins	1,379	0.06%	0
Independent	Monica Moorehead	Gloria La Riva	1,333	0.06%	0
Independent	Mary Cal Hollis	Eric Chester	848	0.04%	0
Independent	James Harris	Laura Garza	483	0.02%	0

=== Results by county ===
County	Bill Clinton Democratic		Bob Dole Republican		Ross Perot Reform		Ralph Nader Green		Various candidates Other parties		Margin		Total votes cast
County	#	%	#	%	#	%	#	%	#	%	#	%	Total votes cast
Adams	4,119	52.65%	2,450	31.31%	1,122	14.34%	54	0.69%	79	1.01%	1,669	21.34%	7,824
Ashland	3,808	56.02%	1,863	27.41%	861	12.67%	149	2.19%	117	1.72%	1,945	28.61%	6,798
Barron	8,025	46.68%	6,158	35.82%	2,692	15.66%	215	1.25%	101	0.59%	1,867	10.86%	17,191
Bayfield	3,895	53.07%	2,250	30.65%	899	12.25%	233	3.17%	63	0.86%	1,645	22.42%	7,340
Brown	42,823	47.14%	38,563	42.45%	8,036	8.85%	817	0.90%	598	0.66%	4,260	4.69%	90,837
Buffalo	2,681	48.25%	1,800	32.39%	972	17.49%	69	1.24%	35	0.63%	881	15.86%	5,557
Burnett	3,625	50.56%	2,452	34.20%	962	13.42%	81	1.13%	49	0.68%	1,173	16.36%	7,169
Calumet	6,940	42.58%	7,049	43.25%	2,112	12.96%	77	0.47%	121	0.74%	-109	-0.67%	16,299
Chippewa	9,647	45.65%	7,520	35.59%	3,567	16.88%	228	1.08%	169	0.80%	2,127	10.06%	21,131
Clark	5,540	43.08%	4,622	35.94%	2,486	19.33%	108	0.84%	105	0.82%	918	7.14%	12,861
Columbia	10,336	48.03%	8,377	38.92%	2,377	11.05%	221	1.03%	210	0.98%	1,959	9.11%	21,521
Crawford	3,658	51.81%	2,149	30.44%	1,060	15.01%	129	1.83%	64	0.91%	1,509	21.37%	7,060
Dane	109,347	56.86%	59,487	30.93%	12,436	6.47%	8,592	4.47%	2,440	1.27%	49,860	25.93%	192,302
Dodge	12,625	42.91%	12,890	43.81%	3,322	11.29%	232	0.79%	353	1.20%	-265	-0.90%	29,422
Door	5,590	45.63%	4,948	40.39%	1,475	12.04%	130	1.06%	108	0.88%	642	5.24%	12,251
Douglas	10,976	59.04%	5,167	27.79%	2,001	10.76%	277	1.49%	170	0.91%	5,809	31.25%	18,591
Dunn	7,536	48.89%	4,917	31.90%	2,555	16.57%	276	1.79%	131	0.85%	2,619	16.99%	15,415
Eau Claire	20,298	50.26%	13,900	34.41%	5,160	12.78%	649	1.61%	383	0.95%	6,398	15.85%	40,390
Florence	869	40.57%	927	43.28%	316	14.75%	10	0.47%	20	0.93%	-58	-2.71%	2,142
Fond du Lac	15,542	42.08%	16,488	44.65%	4,204	11.38%	247	0.67%	450	1.22%	-946	-2.57%	36,931
Forest	2,092	52.76%	1,166	29.41%	678	17.10%	12	0.30%	17	0.43%	926	23.35%	3,965
Grant	9,203	47.90%	7,021	36.54%	2,648	13.78%	195	1.01%	148	0.77%	2,182	11.36%	19,215
Green	6,136	48.64%	4,697	37.23%	1,534	12.16%	119	0.94%	130	1.03%	1,439	11.41%	12,616
Green Lake	3,152	39.99%	3,565	45.23%	1,025	13.00%	59	0.75%	81	1.03%	-413	-5.24%	7,882
Iowa	4,690	52.60%	2,866	32.14%	1,071	12.01%	200	2.24%	89	1.00%	1,824	20.46%	8,916
Iron	1,725	48.85%	1,260	35.68%	469	13.28%	54	1.53%	23	0.65%	465	13.17%	3,531
Jackson	3,705	50.90%	2,262	31.08%	1,163	15.98%	82	1.13%	67	0.92%	1,443	19.82%	7,279
Jefferson	13,188	44.29%	12,681	42.59%	3,177	10.67%	328	1.10%	400	1.34%	507	1.70%	29,774
Juneau	4,331	47.17%	3,226	35.13%	1,393	15.17%	58	0.63%	174	1.90%	1,105	12.04%	9,182
Kenosha	27,964	52.06%	18,296	34.06%	6,507	12.11%	374	0.70%	576	1.07%	9,668	18.00%	53,717
Kewaunee	4,311	47.66%	3,431	37.93%	1,161	12.83%	60	0.66%	83	0.92%	880	9.73%	9,046
La Crosse	23,647	51.41%	16,482	35.83%	4,844	10.53%	599	1.30%	429	0.93%	7,165	15.58%	46,001
Lafayette	3,261	50.48%	2,172	33.62%	944	14.61%	45	0.70%	38	0.59%	1,089	16.86%	6,460
Langlade	4,074	47.20%	3,206	37.15%	1,249	14.47%	48	0.56%	54	0.63%	868	10.05%	8,631
Lincoln	6,166	50.35%	4,076	33.28%	1,800	14.70%	112	0.91%	92	0.75%	2,090	17.07%	12,246
Manitowoc	16,750	48.63%	13,239	38.44%	3,941	11.44%	213	0.62%	301	0.87%	3,511	10.19%	34,444
Marathon	24,012	46.67%	19,874	38.63%	6,749	13.12%	425	0.83%	389	0.76%	4,138	8.04%	51,449
Marinette	8,413	46.18%	7,231	39.70%	2,367	12.99%	74	0.41%	131	0.72%	1,182	6.48%	18,216
Marquette	2,859	46.72%	2,208	36.08%	915	14.95%	60	0.98%	77	1.26%	651	10.64%	6,119
Menominee	992	73.48%	230	17.04%	107	7.93%	10	0.74%	11	0.81%	762	56.44%	1,350
Milwaukee	216,620	58.33%	119,407	32.15%	26,027	7.01%	4,589	1.24%	4,737	1.28%	97,213	26.18%	371,380
Monroe	6,924	47.42%	5,299	36.29%	2,081	14.25%	145	0.99%	151	1.03%	1,625	11.13%	14,600
Oconto	6,723	48.42%	5,389	38.81%	1,655	11.92%	66	0.48%	52	0.37%	1,334	9.61%	13,885
Oneida	7,619	45.04%	6,339	37.47%	2,604	15.39%	221	1.31%	134	0.79%	1,280	7.57%	16,917
Outagamie	28,815	44.41%	27,758	42.78%	7,235	11.15%	519	0.80%	562	0.87%	1,057	1.63%	64,889
Ozaukee	13,269	34.06%	22,078	56.67%	2,774	7.12%	351	0.90%	489	1.26%	-8,809	-22.61%	38,961
Pepin	1,585	51.24%	1,007	32.56%	456	14.74%	29	0.94%	16	0.52%	578	18.68%	3,093
Pierce	7,970	53.13%	4,599	30.66%	2,074	13.83%	219	1.46%	138	0.92%	3,371	22.47%	15,000
Polk	8,334	50.78%	5,387	32.82%	2,369	14.43%	200	1.22%	123	0.75%	2,947	17.96%	16,413
Portage	15,901	53.13%	9,631	32.18%	3,410	11.39%	612	2.04%	374	1.25%	6,270	20.95%	29,928
Price	3,523	47.67%	2,545	34.44%	1,218	16.48%	73	0.99%	31	0.42%	978	13.23%	7,390
Racine	38,567	49.72%	30,107	38.81%	7,611	9.81%	478	0.62%	805	1.04%	8,460	10.91%	77,568
Richland	3,502	48.49%	2,642	36.58%	901	12.48%	102	1.41%	75	1.04%	860	11.91%	7,222
Rock	32,450	53.80%	20,096	33.32%	6,800	11.27%	518	0.86%	456	0.76%	12,354	20.48%	60,320
Rusk	2,941	44.27%	2,219	33.40%	1,331	20.04%	85	1.28%	67	1.01%	722	10.87%	6,643
Sauk	9,889	48.75%	7,448	36.72%	2,448	12.07%	236	1.16%	264	1.30%	2,441	12.03%	20,285
Sawyer	2,773	42.83%	2,603	40.20%	962	14.86%	93	1.44%	44	0.68%	170	2.63%	6,475
Shawano	6,850	44.19%	6,396	41.26%	2,071	13.36%	97	0.63%	86	0.55%	454	2.93%	15,500
Sheboygan	22,022	46.85%	20,067	42.69%	4,157	8.84%	308	0.66%	449	0.96%	1,955	4.16%	47,003
St. Croix	11,384	49.04%	8,253	35.55%	3,180	13.70%	230	0.99%	166	0.72%	3,131	13.49%	23,213
Taylor	3,253	41.01%	3,108	39.18%	1,457	18.37%	55	0.69%	59	0.74%	145	1.83%	7,932
Trempealeau	5,848	54.18%	3,035	28.12%	1,688	15.64%	150	1.39%	73	0.68%	2,813	26.06%	10,794
Vernon	5,572	49.63%	3,796	33.81%	1,523	13.57%	191	1.70%	144	1.28%	1,776	15.82%	11,226
Vilas	4,226	40.46%	4,496	43.04%	1,548	14.82%	121	1.16%	54	0.52%	-270	-2.58%	10,445
Walworth	13,283	40.30%	15,099	45.81%	3,729	11.31%	369	1.12%	481	1.46%	-1,816	-5.51%	32,961
Washburn	3,231	46.18%	2,703	38.64%	920	13.15%	93	1.33%	49	0.70%	528	7.54%	6,996
Washington	17,154	35.18%	25,829	52.96%	4,786	9.81%	338	0.69%	660	1.35%	-8,675	-17.78%	48,767
Waukesha	57,354	34.66%	91,729	55.43%	13,109	7.92%	1,248	0.75%	2,032	1.23%	-34,375	-20.77%	165,472
Waupaca	7,800	40.53%	8,679	45.10%	2,464	12.80%	134	0.70%	166	0.86%	-879	-4.57%	19,243
Waushara	3,824	43.31%	3,573	40.46%	1,264	14.31%	67	0.76%	102	1.16%	251	2.85%	8,830
Winnebago	29,564	45.31%	27,880	42.73%	6,531	10.01%	584	0.90%	688	1.05%	1,684	2.58%	65,247
Wood	14,650	45.08%	12,666	38.97%	4,599	14.15%	281	0.86%	304	0.94%	1,984	6.11%	32,500
Totals	1,071,971	48.81%	845,029	38.48%	227,339	10.35%	28,723	1.31%	23,107	1.05%	226,942	10.33%	2,196,169

==== Counties that flipped from Democratic to Republican ====
- Florence

==== Counties that flipped from Republican to Democratic ====
- Brown
- Door
- Jefferson
- Langlade
- Marinette
- Outagamie
- Shawano
- Sheboygan
- Taylor
- Waushara
- Winnebago
- Wood

=== By congressional district ===
Clinton won all but one of the state's nine congressional districts, including three which elected Republicans.

District	Clinton	Dole	Perot	Representative
1st	49.7%	37.5%	11%	Mark Neumann
2nd	54.5%	32.7%	8.1%	Scott Klug
3rd	49.9%	34.2%	13.8%	Steve Gunderson
3rd	49.9%	34.2%	13.8%	Ron Kind
4th	49%	39.9%	9.1%	Tom Barrett
5th	62.9%	29.2%	5.1%	Jerry Kleczka
6th	44.9%	41.5%	11.8%	Tom Petri
7th	48.8%	35.1%	14%	Dave Obey
8th	45.8%	41.5%	11.3%	Toby Roth
8th	45.8%	41.5%	11.3%	Jay Johnson
9th	37.2%	52.1%	8.6%	Jim Sensenbrenner

== See also ==
- United States presidential elections in Wisconsin
