= 2000 United States presidential election in Rhode Island =

- November 7, 2000
- Turnout: 61.4% ▼3.4 pp

Nominee	Al Gore	George W. Bush	Ralph Nader
Party	Democratic	Republican	Green
Home state	Tennessee	Texas	Connecticut
Running mate	Joe Lieberman	Dick Cheney	Winona LaDuke
Electoral vote	4	0	0
Popular vote	249,508	130,555	25,052
Percentage	60.99%	31.91%	6.12%

Gore
40–50%
50–60%
60–70%
70–80%
Bush
40–50%
President before election
Bill Clinton
Democratic
Elected President
George W. Bush
Republican

The 2000 United States presidential election in Rhode Island took place on November 7, 2000, and was part of the 2000 United States presidential election. Voters chose four representatives, or electors to the Electoral College, who voted for president and vice president.

Rhode Island voted for the Democratic Party's candidate, then Vice President Al Gore of Tennessee, over the Republican Party's candidate, Governor George W. Bush of Texas. Gore ran with Senator Joe Lieberman of Connecticut as his running mate, while Bush ran with former Secretary of Defense Dick Cheney as his running mate.

Rhode Island is one of the most reliably Democratic states in the country. This state was Democrat Al Gore's best performance in the 2000 presidential election, where he won with over 60% of the vote. Gore won all five of the Ocean State's counties and won all but two townships. Ralph Nader, running a high-profile campaign on behalf of the Green Party with Winona LaDuke as his running mate, took 6.12% of the popular vote in the state, making Rhode Island his fourth best showing in the 2000 election after Alaska, Vermont and neighboring Massachusetts. Despite Gore not winning the national election, his over 29-point win margin in this state has not been topped since.

== Primary elections ==
Primary elections for delegates to the Republican and Democratic national conventions were held on March 7.

=== Democratic primary ===
Al Gore won the primary from Rhode Island and won every county except Bristol County and Washington County. The state was worth 32 delegates.

Al Gore	Bill Bradley	other
26,801	19,000	1,043
57%	41%	2%

=== Republican primary ===
This primary was one of the very few states Senator John McCain won in the 2000 Republican primaries against George W. Bush. He won every single county, town, and city in the state. He also won all of the state's 14 delegates.

John McCain	George W. Bush	others
21,754	13,170	1,196
60%	36%	4%

== General election ==
=== Polling ===
Poll source	Date(s)	Sample size	Margin of error	George W. Bush (R)	Al Gore (D)	Ralph Nader (G)	Other / undecided (Note: Calculated by taking the difference of 100% and all other listed candidates combined. For polls that do not report a figure for Nader, this includes his support.)
SurveyUSA	October 29, 2000	500	—	31%	57%	—	12%
Brown University A. Alfred Taubman Center for American Politics and Policy	October 22, 2000	370	—	29%	47%	8%	16%
Rasmussen Reports	October 19, 2000	802	—	30%	49%	—	21%

=== Results ===
2000 United States presidential election in Rhode Island
Party	Candidate	Running mate	Votes	Percentage	Electoral votes
Democratic	Al Gore	Joe Lieberman	249,508	60.99%	4
Republican	George W. Bush	Dick Cheney	130,555	31.91%	0
Green	Ralph Nader	Winona LaDuke	25,052	6.12%	0
Reform	Pat Buchanan	Ezola Foster	2,273	0.56%	0
Libertarian	Harry Browne	Art Oliver	742	0.18%	0
No party	Write-in		329	0.08%	0
Natural Law	Dr. John Hagelin	A. Nat. Goldhaber	271	0.07%	0
Workers World Party	Monica Moorehead	Gloria La Riva	199	0.05%	0
Constitution Party	Howard Phillips	J. Curtis Frazer	97	0.02%	0
Socialist	David McReynolds	Mary Cal Hollis	52	0.01%	0
Soc. Workers	James Harris	Margaret Trowe	34	0.01%	0
TOTAL			409,112	100%	4

==== By county ====
County	Al Gore Democratic		George W. Bush Republican		Various candidates Other parties		Margin		Total votes cast
County	#	%	#	%	#	%	#	%	Total votes cast
Bristol	13,424	57.68%	8,375	35.99%	1,473	6.33%	5,049	21.69%	23,272
Kent	43,265	58.89%	25,291	34.42%	4,914	6.69%	17,974	24.47%	73,470
Newport	20,790	54.94%	14,258	37.68%	2,790	7.38%	6,532	17.26%	37,838
Providence	142,469	65.26%	61,378	28.12%	14,461	6.62%	81,091	37.14%	218,308
Washington	29,560	52.58%	21,253	37.80%	5,411	9.62%	8,307	14.78%	56,224
Totals	249,508	60.99%	130,555	31.91%	29,049	7.10%	118,953	29.08%	409,112

==== By congressional district ====
Gore won both congressional districts.

District	Gore	Bush	Representative
1st	62%	31%	Patrick J. Kennedy
2nd	60%	33%	Robert Weygand
2nd	60%	33%	James Langevin

== See also ==
- United States presidential elections in Rhode Island
