= Maura DeLuca =

American politician and activist

Maura DeLuca is an American activist and political candidate. DeLuca ran as the vice presidential nominee of the Socialist Workers Party in the 2012 U.S. presidential election with running mate James Harris. The ticket received 4,115 votes, the lowest total in the party's history.

DeLuca was previously the Socialist Workers Party candidate for Governor of New York in 2006. She received 5,919 votes, or 0.13%, coming in last out of six candidates.

In 2013 she ran in the Omaha mayoral race, receiving 0.33% of the vote and coming in sixth out of seven candidates.

Party political offices
Preceded by Alyson Kennedy	Socialist Workers Party nominee for Vice President of the United States; 2012	Succeeded by Osborne Hart
