= Arrin Hawkins =

American politician

Arrin Hawkins is an American activist and political candidate. Hawkins ran as the vice presidential nominee of the Socialist Workers Party in the 2004 U.S. presidential election, while Róger Calero ran for president.

Because she could not reach 35 years of age in time for inauguration, she was constitutionally ineligible to serve as vice president. Therefore, some states did not allow Hawkins's name to be listed on the ballot. In those states, Margaret Trowe, the Socialist Workers' vice-presidential candidate from the 2000 ticket, stood in for her on the ballot. Calero also required an alternate in some states, because he was born in Nicaragua; the original candidate Martin Koppel would also have been ineligible. The ticket with Calero at the head won 5,150 votes and that with James Harris won 2,424.

As the running mate of Martin Koppel, she was the SWP candidate for Lieutenant Governor of New York in 2002. She ran for Manhattan Borough president in 2005, winning 2,375 votes (1%), losing by a wide margin to Scott Stringer.

Hawkins is a leader in the youth wing of the Socialist Workers' Party. She holds a degree from the University of Minnesota, where she spent time in Senegal studying the role of women in African society.

Party political offices
Preceded by Margaret Trowe	Socialist Workers Party nominee for Vice President of the United States^{1} 2004	Succeeded by Alyson Kennedy
Notes and references
1. Margaret Trowe, the SWP's 2000 vice presidential nominee, was used as a stand-in candidate in states were Hawkins could not be listed on the ballot. This was because Hawkins did not meet the requirements to be vice president.
