= Róger Calero =

Nicaraguan journalist and leader of Socialist Workers Party

Socialist Workers Party candidate for President of the United States

Personal details
- Born: 1969; Nicaragua
- Political party: Socialist Workers Party

Róger Calero (born 1969) is a Nicaraguan journalist living in the United States and one of the leaders of the Socialist Workers Party. He was SWP candidate for President of the United States in 2004 and 2008, and for the United States Senate in New York in 2006.

== Early life ==
Calero was born in Nicaragua in 1969. He and his family fled via Los Angeles, California, in 1985. Calero has been a lawful permanent resident of the United States (holding a green card) since 1990. While in Los Angeles, Calero joined a socialist movement and helped mobilize support against Proposition 187 in the early 90s.

Calero, a former meat packer, has been associate editor of Perspectiva Mundial (official Spanish language newspaper of the SWP) and a staff writer for The Militant (official English language newspaper of the SWP).

He now lives in Newark, New Jersey.

== Legal problems ==
Calero was convicted of felony sale of marijuana in 1988. In December 2002, immigration police arrested Calero upon his return to the United States at the George Bush Intercontinental Airport from reporting assignments at a conference held in Havana, Cuba, protesting the Free Trade Area of the Americas. He was threatened with deportation in 2002 as a result of his previous conviction in 1988.

The SWP considered the conviction to have been a political attack and launched a huge campaign in defense of Calero, mobilizing the party's members and supporters in the U.S. and all over the world. The U.S. government released Calero in 2003 and cancelled the deportation. The same year, Calero went on an international tour, visiting not only the major cities in the US, but also Canada, Australia, the United Kingdom, Sweden and Iceland to greet his supporters.

== Electoral campaigns ==
In 2004, Róger Calero was the SWP candidate for President of the United States and received 3,689 votes, with Arrin Hawkins running for vice president. Because he is not a natural born citizen of the United States, Calero is ineligible to become U.S. president under the United States Constitution, meaning that even had he won the election, he would not have been permitted to serve, and so James Harris, the Socialist Workers' Party presidential candidate from 2000, stood in on the ticket in nine states where Calero could not be listed, receiving 7,102 additional votes.

In 2006, Róger Calero appeared on the ballot in New York as the Socialist Workers Party candidate for US Senate. He received 6,967 votes.

Róger Calero again ran for President of the United States representing the SWP in the 2008 presidential election, together with Alyson Kennedy for vice-president. Again, James Harris stood in for Calero in several states. In the 2008 presidential election, Calero was on the ballot in five states, where he received 7,209 votes. Coupled with the 2,424 votes received in the five states where Harris was on the ballot.

Party political offices
| Preceded by James Harris | Socialist Workers Party nominee for President of the United States^{1} 2004, 2008 | Succeeded by James Harris |
Notes and references
1. James Harris, the SWP's 2000 Presidential nominee, was used as a stand-in candidate in states where Calero, who does not meet the requirements to be President, could not be listed on the ballot.
