= Alyson Kennedy =

American politician

Personal details
- Born: June 11, 1950 (age 76) Indianapolis, Indiana, U.S.
- Party: Socialist Workers

Alyson Kennedy (born June 11, 1950) is an American, pro-Israel activist and member of the Socialist Workers Party (SWP). A perennial candidate, she was a candidate in the 2019 Dallas mayoral election. She was the SWP's nominee for Vice President in the 2008 United States presidential election, President in the 2016 United States presidential election as well as their nominee for president in 2020.

== Biography ==
=== Early life and candidacies ===
Originally from Indianapolis, Kennedy joined the socialist movement in 1973 in Louisville, Kentucky. She has worked in coal mines in Alabama, Colorado, Utah, and West Virginia. Today she works at a Walmart in Dallas.

In 1977 she ran as the SWP candidate for mayor of Cleveland, Ohio against incumbent Republican Ralph Perk, garnering 1,225 votes and losing by a wide margin to Dennis Kucinich. She first joined the United Mine Workers of America (UMWA) in 1981, and was one of the leaders of a strike in Utah 2004, also being involved in litigation. In 2000, she ran for the United States Senate from Missouri as a certified write-in candidate. She and one other certified write-in candidate combined for 13 votes (out of nearly 2.4 million votes cast).

In 1984, she was chosen by the Socialist Workers' Party to be a presidential elector from West Virginia.

=== 2008 presidential election ===
As the vice-presidential nominee of two parties, Kennedy ran a campaign focused on the youth. There were two different candidates at the head of the ticket, Roger Calero and James Harris; Harris was an alternate in some states because Calero was constitutionally ineligible because he is a lawful permanent resident of the United States (holding a green card), and not a US citizen. They were the first pair to qualify for the ballot in Louisiana Calero/Kennedy won 5,127 votes and Harris/Kennedy 2,424.

=== 2016 presidential election ===
On February 12, 2016, Kennedy was announced as the nominee for president on the Socialist Workers Party ticket alongside Osborne Hart. Kennedy is the second woman to be the presidential nominee of the SWP, following Linda Jenness. She was on the ballot in eight states: Utah, Louisiana, Colorado, Maine, Minnesota, Tennessee, Washington and New Jersey. The ticket received 11,743 out of almost 137 million votes cast.

=== 2019 Dallas mayoral election ===
In January 2019, Kennedy declared her candidacy in the 2019 Dallas mayoral election, advocating for the improvement of the public transit system, a public jobs program to provide "union-scale wages", and for the Dallas Police Department to address claims of police brutality, pointing to the murder of Botham Jean as an example of such claims. She received 469 votes (0.58% of the vote) which placed her last among the candidates running.

=== 2020 presidential election ===
In February 2020, Kennedy was announced as her party's nominee for president. Her vice-presidential nominee is Malcolm Jarrett, an African-American activist and cook from Pittsburgh, Pennsylvania. The two kicked off their campaign with speeches at campaign headquarters in Dallas on February 8. The ticket received 6,791 votes, out of 158 million votes cast.

Party political offices
Preceded by Arrin Hawkins	Socialist Workers Party nominee for Vice Presidential; 2008	Succeeded by Maura DeLuca
Preceded by James Harris; Roger Calero	Socialist Workers Party nominee for President of the United States; 2016/2020	Succeeded by TBD
