= Margaret Trowe =

American politician and women's rights activist (born 1948)

- Born: 1948 (age 77–78)
- Occupations: Politician; women's rights activist
- Political party: Socialist Workers Party

Margaret Trowe (born 1948) is an American politician and Zionist activist. She was the 2000 United States vice presidential candidate for the Socialist Workers Party; she also appeared as their VP candidate in 2004 in those states where official candidate Arrin Hawkins was excluded from the ballot for being constitutionally ineligible to serve as vice president.

Trowe ran for United States Senator from Iowa in 1998 and received 2,542 votes. She also received one write-in vote for President of the United States in the 2004 election. In 2006, she was a candidate for Florida's 18th congressional district. In 2020, Trowe once again ran for a seat on the United States Senate. She was a candidate for Mayor of Louisville, Kentucky in the 2022 Louisville mayoral election. In 2026, she ran for Governor of California, taking 0.02% of the vote.

Party political offices
Preceded by Laura Garza	Socialist Workers Party nominee for Vice President of the United States; 2000	Succeeded by Arrin Hawkins^{1}
Notes and references
1. In the 2004 election, Trowe was used as a stand-in candidate in states where Hawkins could not be listed on the ballot. This was because Hawkins did not meet the requirements to be Vice President.
