= Lamont Lilly =

American political activist (born 1979)

- Born: 1979 (age 46–47); Fayetteville, North Carolina, U.S.
- Occupations: Political activist and journalist
- Political party: Workers World Party (2011–2018)

Lamont Lilly (born 1979) is an American writer, political activist, and community organizer based in Durham, North Carolina. He is also a former vice-presidential candidate with the Workers World Party in the 2016 presidential election.

== Early life and education ==
Lamont Lilly was born in 1979 in Fayetteville, North Carolina, United States. He served in the United States Army Reserve, being honorably discharged in 2001. In 1998 Lilly moved to Durham, North Carolina, and enrolled at North Carolina Central University (NCCU), studying criminal justice. He graduated in 2003. Lilly initially aspired to become a lawyer. During his sophomore year of college he worked at a store at Northgate Mall, and while there he allowed a friend to use his employee discount. He later confessed and was convicted of felony embezzlement. He subsequently struggled to maintain employment and for a time became homeless. He later credited these experiences with shaping his views of homelessness and the criminal justice system.

Shortly after graduating from NCCU, he pursued graduate studies in sociology, also at NCCU, but decided to forego traditional education and worked for several years as a grassroots non-profit program coordinator, focusing on Black youth leadership and academic development. His focus on Black youth and families continued as he became an activist and community organizer. In 2005 Lilly was hired by NCCU to serve the director of its African American Male Leadership Academy. He left the job in 2008.

== Activism and journalism ==
In 2011 Lilly participated in the Occupy Wall Street protests in New York City. That year he joined the Workers World Party (WWP). In 2015 he became a paid organizer for the party. He served as the party's U.S. vice presidential candidate in the 2016 presidential election. Lilly left the party in 2018, though he still identified as a socialist.

From 2013 to 2018 Lilly was a Durham political activist, a leading member of the Durham branch of the WWP, a member of WWP's National Committee, and an early member of Black Alliance for Peace.

In 2010, Lilly traveled to Colombia in South America as a human rights delegate with Witness for Peace, advocating for displaced Indigenous and Afro-Colombian people. In 2015, he went to Syria and Lebanon in a group led by Ramsey Clark and Cynthia McKinney. In Beirut, he spoke as a Black Lives Matter representative at the International Forum for Justice Palestine. In Damascus, he met with members of the Popular Front for the Liberation of Palestine.

Lilly has participated in several protests in the United States, including the 2015 Baltimore protests after the police murder of Freddie Gray, to the Days of Grace actions in Charleston, SC in the wake of the racist massacre at Emanuel African Methodist Episcopal Church; Lilly has been present and involved at numerous instances of civil unrest related to racial discrimination, recording his perspective as an activist-journalist in the Black Lives Matter movement.

Lilly participated in the protests in Ferguson after the 2014 police murder of Michael Brown Jr. and was present at the 2016 Standing Rock protests. Later, he led support rallies for the arrested activists who tore down the Confederate statue in Durham in 2017. Lilly has helped to lead demonstrations in Boston, Chicago, Cleveland, Los Angeles, Milwaukee, New York City, Oakland, Philadelphia, and San Diego.

Lilly has written as a guest columnist in The Durham News, The Herald-Sun, and Triangle Tribune. As of 2020 he is a regular contributor for Truthout.

He has also been a guest speaker and facilitated workshops at several colleges and universities including the University of Pittsburgh at Bradford, Marshall University, and Malcolm X College.

== Community ==
Lilly was awarded the 2015 Local Hero Citizen's Award by Indy Week for "pushing for workers' rights and police reform" and the 2017 Spectacular Magazine Man of the Year for "human rights and social justice". The Courier Newsroom named Lilly as one of their "Heroes of 2020" for his continued activism in the Movement for Black Lives. He attributes much of his political development to Monica Moorehead, Pam Africa, Mark Anthony Neal, and Mumia Abu-Jamal. He has also credited the writings of Thomas Sankara, Lucille Clifton, Amiri Baraka, Henry Dumas, Sonia Sanchez, Gwendolyn Brooks, and Kwame Nkrumah with influencing his political beliefs.

Lilly currently resides in Durham's historically African-American community, Old Hayti. He is also a member of the Alpha Kappa chapter of Kappa Alpha Psi fraternity.
