= Third-party and independent candidates for the 1996 United States presidential election =

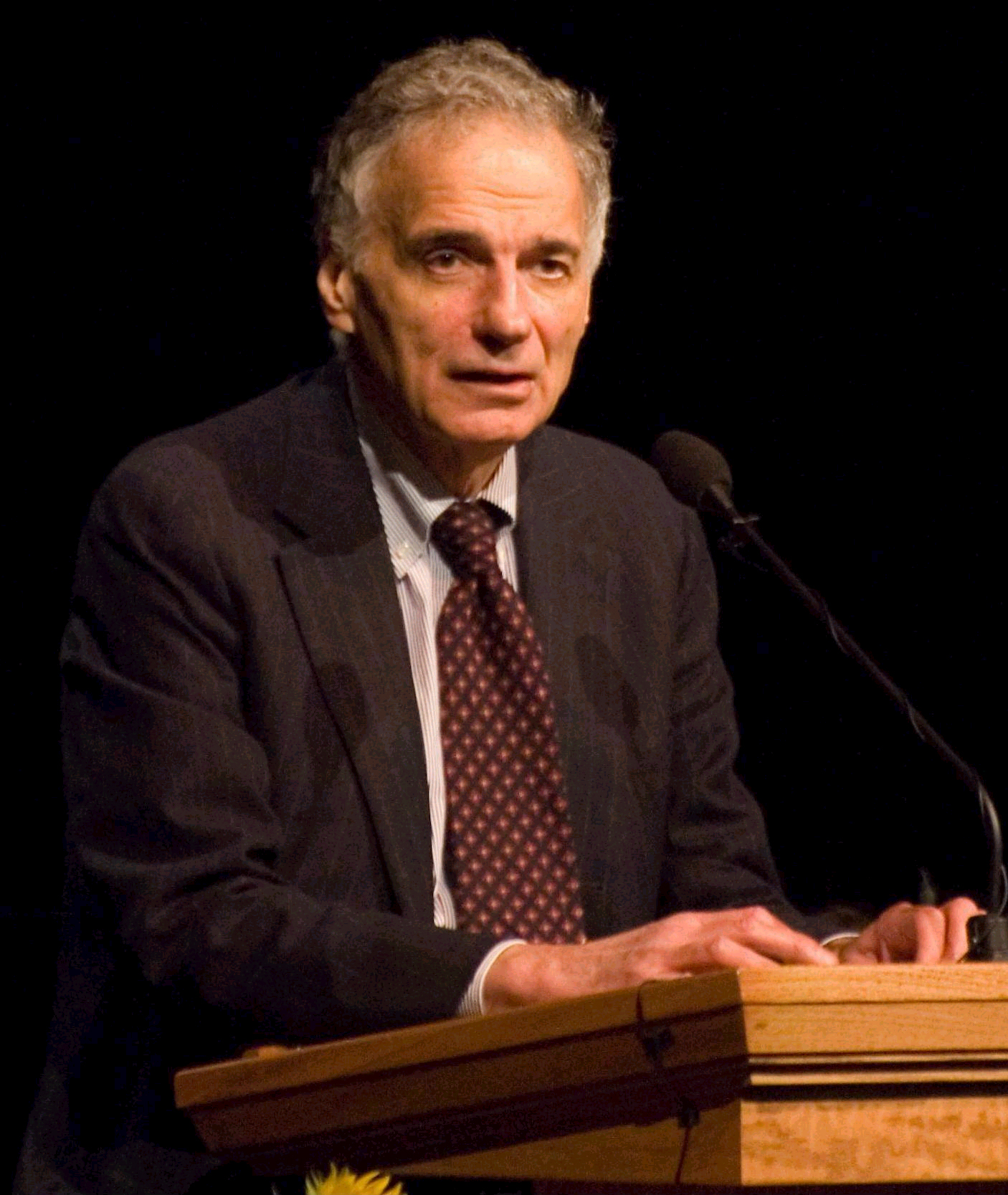

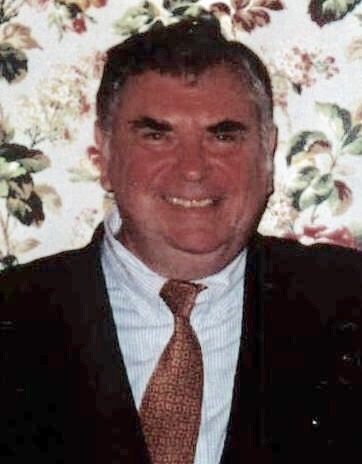

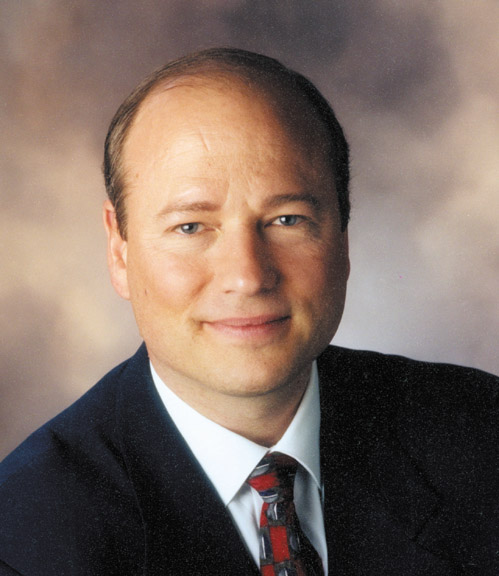
Nominee	Ross Perot	Ralph Nader	Harry Browne
Party	Reform	Green	Libertarian
Home state	Texas	Connecticut	Tennessee
Running mate	Pat Choate	Winona LaDuke	Jo Jorgensen
Popular vote	8,085,402	684,902	485,798
Percentage	8.40%	0.71%	0.50%
Nominee	Howard Phillips	John Hagelin
Party	Constitution	Natural Law
Home state	Virginia	Iowa
Running mate	Herbert Titus	Mike Tompkins
Popular vote	184,658	113,668
Percentage	0.19%	0.12%

This article contains lists of official and potential third party and independent candidates associated with the 1996 United States presidential election.

"Third party" is a term commonly used in the United States in reference to political parties other than the two major parties, the Democratic Party and the Republican Party. An independent candidate is one who runs for office with no formal party affiliation.

Parties with ballot access in states holding 270 or more electoral votes are listed first in this article because 270 electoral votes represent a majority of the 538 electoral votes in the Electoral College.

== Ballot access to all 538 electoral votes ==
=== Reform Party nomination ===
Ross Perot was on the ballot in every state.

Reform candidates

- Ross Perot – party founder and businessman from Texas
- Richard Lamm – former governor of Colorado
- David L. Boren – former senator from and former governor of Oklahoma (declined)
- Lowell P. Weicker Jr. – former senator from and former governor of Connecticut (declined)
- Tim Penny – former representative from Minnesota (declined)
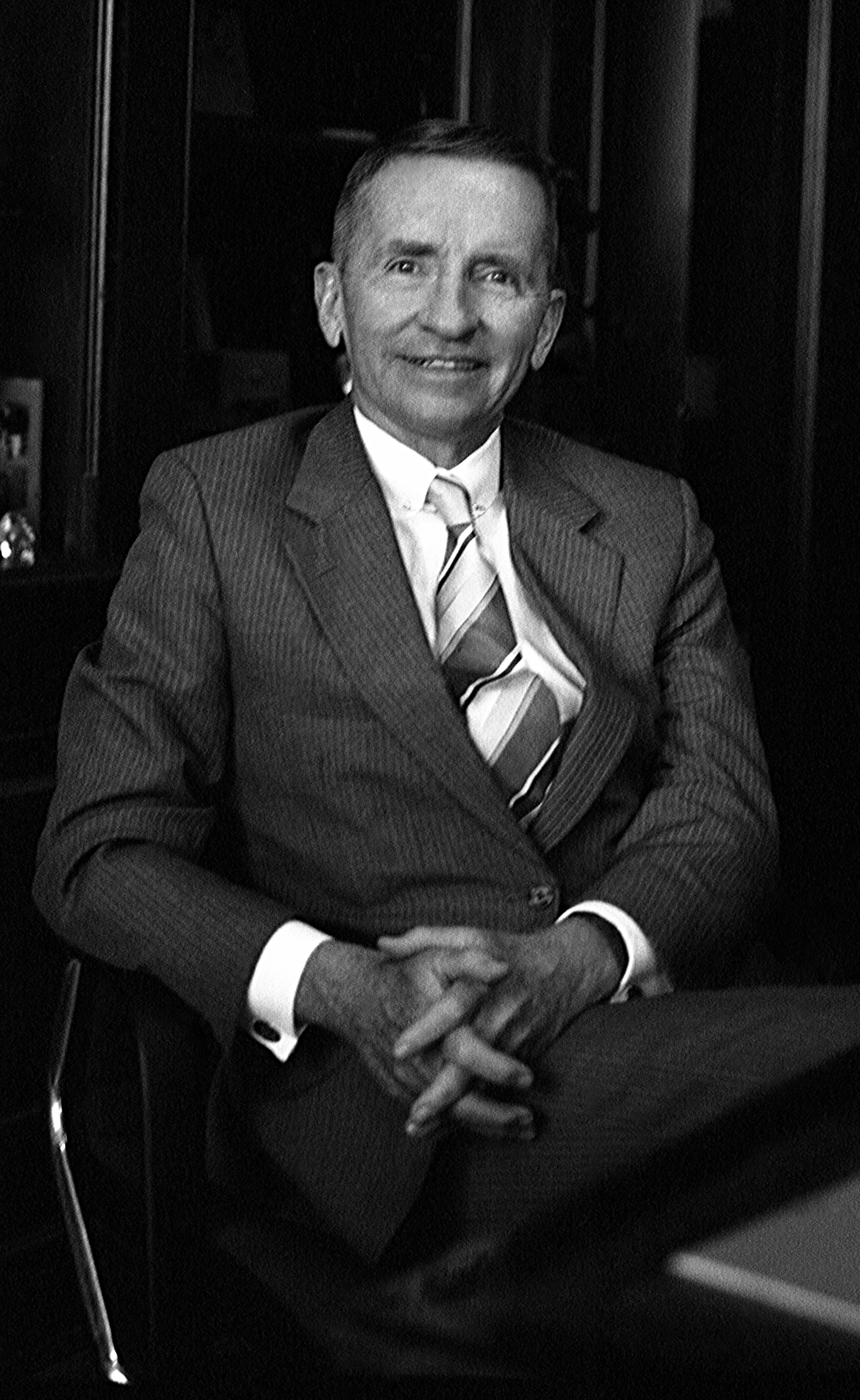
Party Founder Ross Perot, from Texas

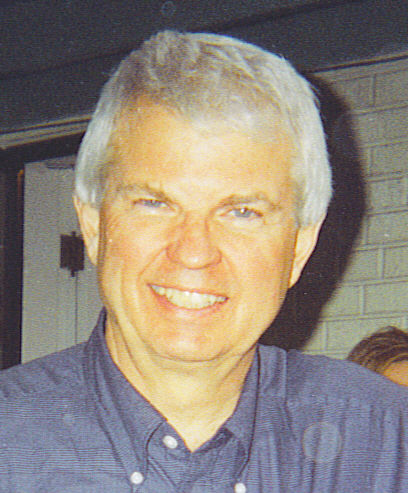
Former governor Richard Lamm of Colorado
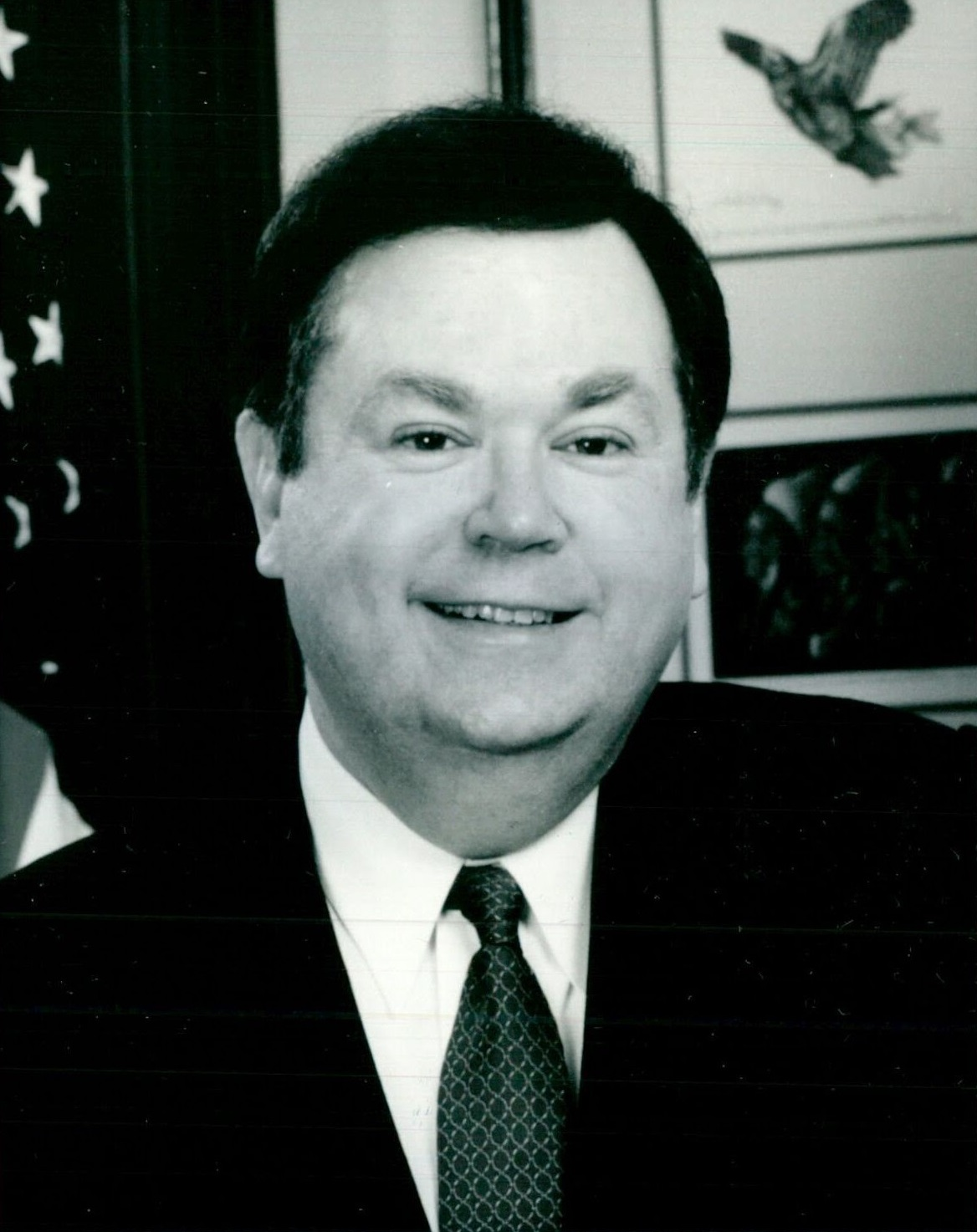
Former senator David Boren from Oklahoma (declined)

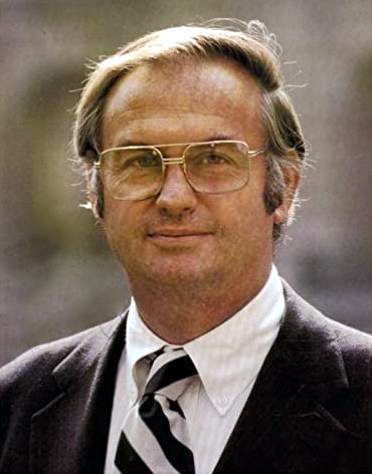
Former governor Lowell Weicker of Connecticut (declined)

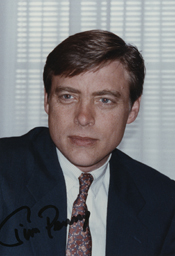
Former representative Tim Penny from Minnesota
(declined)

The United States Reform Party had great difficulty in finding a candidate willing to run in the general election. Lowell Weicker, Tim Penny, David Boren and Richard Lamm were among those who toyed with the notion of seeking its presidential nomination, though all but Lamm decided against it; Lamm had himself come close to withdrawing his name from consideration.

Ultimately, the Reform Party nominated its founder Ross Perot of Texas in its first election as an official political party. Although Perot easily won the nomination, his victory at the party's national convention led to a schism as supporters of Lamm accused him of rigging the vote to prevent them from casting their ballots. This faction walked out of the national convention and eventually formed their own group, the American Reform Party, and attempted to convince Lamm to run as an Independent in the general election; Lamm declined, pointing out a promise he made before running that he would respect the Party's final decision.

Economist Pat Choate was nominated for Vice President.

=== Libertarian Party nomination ===
Harry Browne was on the ballot in every state.

Libertarian candidates

- Harry Browne – writer and investment analyst from Tennessee
- Rick Tompkins – former candidate for senator from Arizona
- Irwin Schiff – writer and prominent figure in the tax protester movement from Nevada
- Douglas J. Ohmen – political activist from California
- Jeffrey Diket – political activist from Louisiana
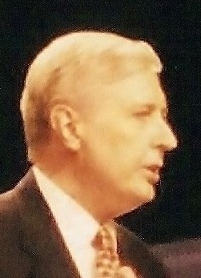
Writer Harry Browne from Tennessee

The Libertarian Party nominated free-market writer and investment analyst, Harry Browne of Tennessee, and selected Jo Jorgensen of South Carolina as his running-mate. Browne and Jorgensen drew 485,798 votes (0.51% of the popular vote).

The Balloting
Presidential Ballot	1st
Harry Browne	416
Rick Tompkins	74
None	61
Irwin Schiff	32
Douglas J. Ohmen	20
Jeffrey Diket	1
Jo Jorgensen	1

== Ballot access to less than 538, but more than 270 electoral votes ==
=== Natural Law Party nomination ===
John Hagelin was on the ballot in forty-three states (463 Electoral Votes). Those states with a lighter shade are states in which he was an official write-in candidate.

Natural Law candidate:

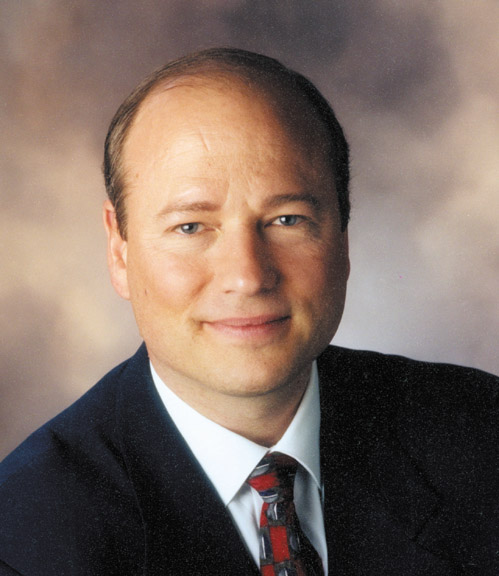
Scientist and researcher John Hagelin from Iowa

The Natural Law Party for a second time nominated scientist and researcher John Hagelin for president and Mike Tompkins for vice president. The party platform included preventive health care, sustainable agriculture and renewable energy technologies. During his campaigns, Hagelin favored abortion rights without public financing, campaign finance law reform, improved gun control, a flat tax, the eradication of PACs, a ban on soft money contributions, and school vouchers.

Hagelin and Tompkins drew 113,671 votes (0.12% of the popular vote).

=== U.S. Taxpayers' Party nomination ===
Howard Phillips was on the ballot in thirty-eight states (414 Electoral Votes). Those states with a lighter shade are states in which he was an official write-in candidate.

U.S. Taxpayers' candidates

- Howard Phillips, conservative political activist from Virginia
- Pat Buchanan, conservative columnist from Virginia (declined)
- Alan Keyes, Former Diplomat and political activist from Maryland (declined)
- Bob Dornan, Congressman from California (declined)
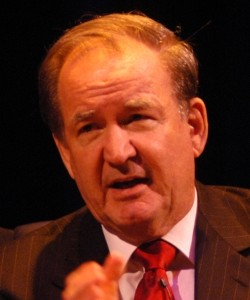
conservative columnist Pat Buchanan
(Declined)

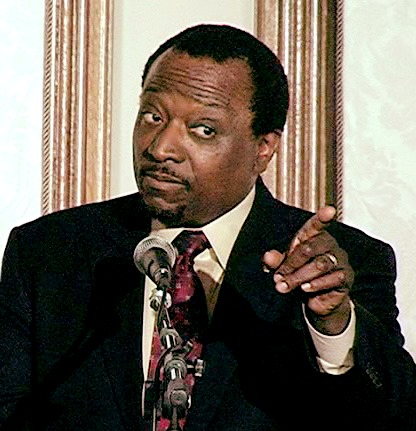
Former Diplomat Alan Keyes
(Declined)

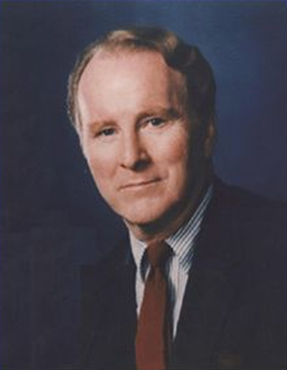
Representative Bob Dornan
(Declined)

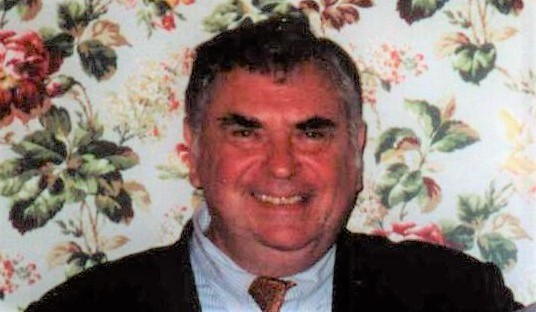
conservative political activist Howard Phillips

The U.S. Taxpayers Party had run its first presidential ticket in 1992, it being head by Howard Phillips who had failed to find any prominent conservative willing to take the mantle. In 1996 the situation ultimately proved the same, though Pat Buchanan for a time was widely speculated to be planning on bolting to the Taxpayers' Party should the expected Republican nominee, Senator Bob Dole, name a Pro-Choice running-mate. When Jack Kemp, who is Pro-Life, was tapped for the position Buchanan agreed to endorse the Republican ticket. Again, Phillips found himself at a temporary post that was made permanent, with Herbert Titus being nominated for the vice presidency.

Phillips and Titus drew 182,820 votes (0.19% of the popular vote).

== Ballot access to fewer than 270, but more than 50 electoral votes ==
=== Green Party nomination ===
Ralph Nader was on the ballot in twenty-one states (225 Electoral Votes). Those states with a lighter shade are states in which he was an official write-in candidate.

Green candidate:

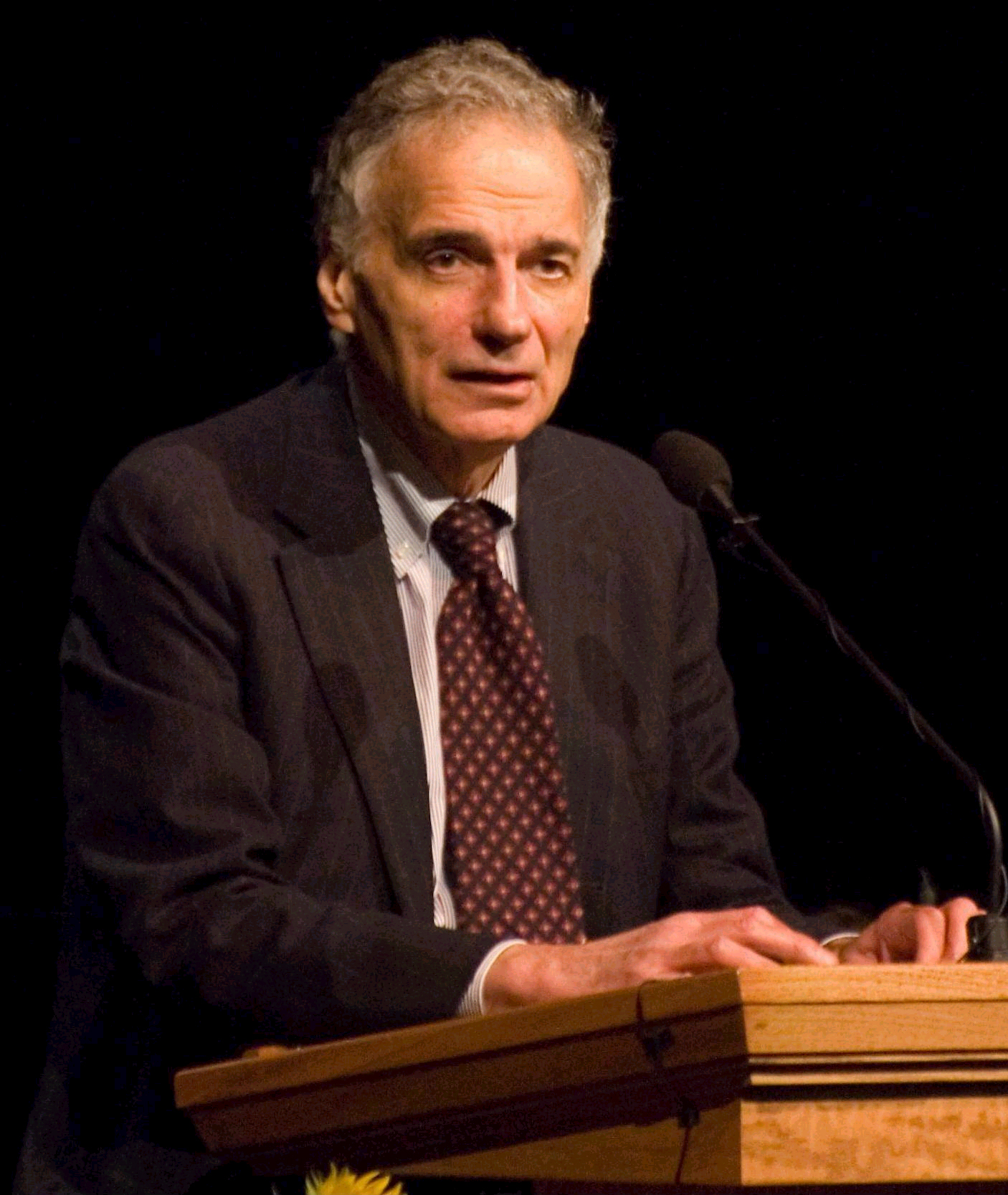
Political activist, author, and attorney Ralph Nader from Connecticut

The Green Party of the United States – Ralph Nader of Connecticut was drafted as a candidate for President of the United States on the Green Party ticket. He was not formally nominated by the Green Party USA, which was, at the time, the largest national Green group; instead he was nominated independently by various state Green parties (in some areas, he appeared on the ballot as an independent). Nader vowed to spend only $5,000 in his election campaign (to avoid having to file a financial statement with the FEC). Winona LaDuke, a Native American activist and economist from Wisconsin, was named as his running-mate.

Nader and LaDuke drew 685,128 votes (0.71% of the popular vote).

=== Workers World Party nomination ===
Monica Moorehead was on the ballot in thirteen states (163 Electoral Votes). Those states with a lighter shade are states in which she was an official write-in candidate.

Workers World candidate:

- Monica Moorehead, school teacher and political activist

The Workers World Party nominated Monica Moorehead for president. Gloria La Riva, who had been on every ticket since 1984, was nominated for vice president.

Moorehead and La Riva drew 29,083 votes (0.03% of the national popular vote).

=== Socialist Workers Party nomination ===
James Harris was on the ballot in ten states (115 Electoral Votes). Those states with a lighter shade are states in which he was an official write-in candidate.

Socialist Workers Party candidate:

- James Harris, political activist and revolutionary

The Socialist Workers Party nominated James Harris for president. Laura Garza was nominated for vice president.

Harris and Garza drew 8,476 votes (0.01% of the national popular vote).

=== Peace and Freedom Party nomination ===
The Peace and Freedom Party, largely based in California, nominated Marsha Feinland for the presidency, while nominating Kate McClatchy for the vice presidency. Feinland and McClatchy received 25,332 votes (0.03% of the National Vote)

Ballot Access: California (54 Electoral)

== Ballot access to fewer than 50 electoral votes ==
=== Socialist Equality Party nomination ===
The Socialist Equality Party nominated Jerry White for the presidency and nominated Fred Mazelis for the vice presidency. White and Mazelis received 2,438 votes.

Ballot Access: Michigan, Minnesota, New Jersey (43 Electoral)

=== Socialist Party USA nomination ===
The Socialist Party USA nominated Mary Cal Hollis of Colorado and Eric Chester of Massachusetts. Hollis and Chester received 4,765 votes.

Ballot Access: Arkansas, Colorado, Oregon, Vermont, Wisconsin (35 Electoral)
Write-In Access: Florida, Indiana, Maryland, Massachusetts, Montana, Texas, Utah

=== Prohibition Party nomination ===
The Prohibition Party nominated Earl Dodge and Rachel Bubar Kelly. Dodge and Kelly received 1,298 votes.

Ballot Access: Arkansas, Colorado, Tennessee, Utah (30 Electoral)
Write-In Access: Illinois, Massachusetts

=== Grassroots Party nomination ===
The Grassroots Party nominated Dennis Peron. Peron received 5,378 votes.

Ballot Access: Minnesota, Vermont (13 Electoral)

=== American Party nomination ===
The American Party nominated Diane Beall Templin and Gary Van Horn. Templin and Van Horn received 1,847 votes.

Ballot Access: Colorado, Utah (13 Electoral)

=== Independent Party of Utah nomination ===
The Independent Party of Utah nominated Alma Peter Crane and Connie Chandler. Crane and Chandler received 1,101 votes.

Ballot Access: Utah (5 Electoral)

=== Independent candidates ===
==== Charles E. Collins ====
Charles E. Collins ran in the general election as an Independent after failing to attain the Republican or U.S. Taxpayers Party nominations for president. Rosemary Giumarra was his running mate. A group known as C.U.R.E. (Constitutionally Unified Republic for Everyone) also endorsed their candidacy. Collins and Giumarra received 8,941 votes (0.01% of the National Vote)

Ballot Access: Arkansas, Colorado, Mississippi, Tennessee, Washington (36 Electoral)
Write-In Access: Arizona, California, Georgia, Idaho, Indiana, Kansas, Maryland, Missouri, Montana, Utah

==== Steve Michael ====
Steve Michael ran as an Independent under the banner of the AIDS Cure Party, with Anne Northrup as his running mate. Michael and Northrup received 408 votes.

Ballot Access: Tennessee (11 Electoral)

=== Speculated ===
The following notable individuals were the subject of speculation about possibly mounting independent bids, but ultimately opted not to go through with them.

- Jesse Jackson, civil rights activist and former Shadow senator from Washington, D.C. (1991-1997)
- Jerry Brown, former governor of California (1975-1983) and candidate for president in 1992
- Paul Tsongas, former senator from Massachusetts (1979-1985) and candidate for president in 1992
- Bernie Sanders, United States Representative from VT-At-large (1991-2007)
- Ron Dellums, United States Representative from CA-9 (1993-1998)
- Barbara Ehrenreich, author
- Bill Bradley, Senator from New Jersey (1979-1997)
- Colin Powell, former chairman of the Joint Chiefs of Staff (1989-1993)
