= James Harris (Socialist Workers Party politician) =

American politician (born 1948)

James E. Harris (born 1948) is an American communist politician, perennial candidate, meatpacker, trade unionist, and member of the National Committee of the Socialist Workers Party. He was the party's candidate for President of the United States in 1996, 2000, and 2012. Harris also served as an alternate candidate for Róger Calero in 2004 and 2008 in states where Calero could not qualify for the ballot due to being born in Nicaragua. He served for a time as the national organization secretary of the SWP and was a staff writer for the party's newspaper, The Militant, in New York.

== Biography ==
Harris was born in Cleveland, Ohio and attended Cleveland State University, where he was a founding member of the Black Student Union. He became a member of the Student Mobilization Committee Against the War in Vietnam and later served on its national staff in Washington, D.C. He was later an organizer in the Young Socialist Alliance and ran for the school board in Cleveland as a Socialist Workers Party Candidate. Harris was endorsed by mayoral candidate Sydney Stapleton, but was defeated in the general election. A supporter of the Cuban revolution, Harris participated in the second Venceremos Brigade to Cuba in 1969 along with hundreds of other youth from the United States. Brigade members cut sugar cane for a couple of months in order to maximize the country's sugar production.

In 1977 Harris moved from Atlanta to New York City in order to join the staff of the National Student Coalition Against Racism, which supported school desegregation. He later became a national chairperson of the coalition. In 1988 Harris was the Socialist Workers Party candidate in New York for the United States Senate. Harris finished seventh with 11,239 votes. Harris lived and worked in Detroit in the early 1990s and was a member of the United Auto Workers. He also helped found the Peoria, Illinois branch of the Socialist Workers Party.

The Socialist Workers Party nominated Harris as their presidential candidate in the 1996 presidential election, Laura Garza was his running mate. He supported abortion rights, proposed raising the minimum wage to $12, and was broadly noninterventionist. The ticket drew 8,476 votes (0.01% of the national popular vote) and spent a total of $180,000.

Harris once again ran for president in 2000 with Margaret Trowe as his running mate. In the state of Florida, Harris was initially rewarded 9,888 votes in Volusia County despite winning a total of just above 500 statewide. After requesting a recount he was found to have only received 8 votes, a "computer disk glitch" was described as the cause.

In 2004 and 2008, Harris was a stand-in candidate for Róger Calero in states where Calero could not qualify for the ballot due to being born in Nicaragua. He was on the ballot in roughly a quarter of states both times and received 7,411 and 2,424 votes in both campaigns. Harris was then the SWP candidate in the 2009 Los Angeles mayoral election, receiving 2,057 votes (0.89%). Carlos Alvarez, the other far-left candidate (from the Party for Socialism and Liberation) received 1.11%.

In 2012 Harris ran for President with Maura DeLuca as his running mate. The ticket received 4,115 votes, the lowest total in the party's history, with one of the party's house candidates performing better than the ticket. He was on the ballot in Colorado, Iowa, Louisiana, Minnesota, New Jersey, and Washington and was a declared write-in candidate in the state of New York.

On the 60th anniversary of the Korean War's ceasefire, Harris joined the Socialist Workers Party delegation to Pyongyang. He endorsed Rachele Fruit for president in 2024.

Party political offices
Preceded by James "Mac" Warren (1992); Róger Calero (2008)	Socialist Workers Party nominee for President of the United States; 1996, 2000, 2004, 2008, 2012	Succeeded by Róger Calero^{1} (2004); Alyson Kennedy (2016)
Notes and references
1. In the 2004 election, Harris was used as a stand-in candidate in states were Calero could not be listed on the ballot. This was because Calero did not meet the requirements to be President. Harris was also a stand-in in the 2008 election.
