= Osborne Hart =

American socialist activist

Osborne Hart (born 1952) is an American socialist activist. Hart was the vice-presidential nominee of the Socialist Workers Party in the 2016 presidential election. He has run for several other offices, including for mayor of Philadelphia in 2015.

Hart's father was a career soldier and he traveled extensively as a youth. His activism began in the 1960s during the Civil Rights Movement. He has also been active in the solidarity movement with socialist Cuba and other political movements.
