= Monica Moorehead =

American political activist

Monica Gail Moorehead
- Born: 1952 (age 73–74); Tuscaloosa, Alabama, U.S.
- Occupation: Political activist

Monica Gail Moorehead (born 1952) is an American retired teacher, writer, and political activist. She was the presidential nominee of the Workers World Party (WWP) in 1996, 2000, and 2016.

== Biography ==
From 1975 to 1980, Monica Moorhead taught kindergarten with Norfolk Public Schools In Norfolk, Virginia.

A political activist since high school, Moorehead distributed newspapers for the Black Panther Party and subsequently joined the WWP in 1972. She rose to the national leadership in 1979. In 1996, Moorehead was the presidential nominee of the party. She appeared on the ballot in 12 states and received around 29,000 votes, 0.3 percent of all cast, the best-ever showing for a WWP candidate in a presidential election. In 2000 she received 4,795 votes; that year she was only on the ballot in Florida, Rhode Island, Washington, and Wisconsin. On both occasions, her vice-presidential running-mate was Gloria La Riva.

In an open letter (entitled "Blame Monica!"), posted on his website shortly after the U.S. presidential election of 2000, filmmaker and activist Michael Moore sarcastically argued that Moorehead, not supporters of Ralph Nader like himself, were responsible for the election of George W. Bush.

Other works include being the author of Feminism and Marxism in the 90s and South Africa: Which Road to Liberation? She also edited the book Marxism, Reparations, and the Black Freedom Struggle, a collection of articles from Workers World newspaper, written by herself and others.

In 2004, Moorehead was one of the campaign managers for the party's presidential candidate, John Parker. During the 2008 presidential campaign, she endorsed Green Party candidate, Cynthia McKinney.

=== 2016 presidential election ===
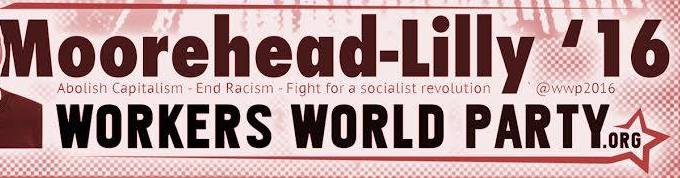
Campaign logo

On November 8, 2015, Moorehead received the 2016 presidential nomination of the Workers World Party, the first time since 2004 that the party had opted to run a presidential candidate. Her running mate was Lamont Lilly. At the time of Moorehead's nomination, the party did not have ballot access in any state. Moorehead ran in the Peace and Freedom Party's presidential primary in California, and received 1,487 votes, 29.72 percent of all ballots cast. Moorehead lost to Gloria la Riva, by then a member of the Party for Socialism and Liberation, who won with 49.47 percent of the vote.

Fairleigh Dickinson University included Moorehead as one of four choices — along with Clinton, Trump, and Prohibition Party candidate Jim Hedges — in an October 2016 poll and found that, in the absence of the Green and Libertarian Party nominees as named choices, Moorehead drew three percent support. In the 2016 general election, Moorehead appeared on the ballot in three states — New Jersey, Utah, and Wisconsin — and as a recognized write-in candidate in six others. She received a total of 4,317 votes.

In 2019, the Atlantic referred to Moorehead as "the once and perhaps future presidential candidate of the Workers World Party", although she did not run in 2020.

Party political offices
Preceded by Gloria La Riva	Workers World Party Presidential candidate 1996 (lost), 2000 (lost)	Succeeded by John Parker
