= 2004 United States presidential election in Minnesota =

- November 2, 2004
- Turnout: 78.77% (▲8.66 pp)

Nominee	John Kerry	George W. Bush
Party	Democratic (DFL)	Republican
Home state	Massachusetts	Texas
Running mate	John Edwards	Dick Cheney
Electoral vote	9 (Note: Although John Kerry won Minnesota's 10 electoral votes, 1 faithless elector voted for John Edwards (written as John Ewards) instead of Kerry)	0
Popular vote	1,445,014	1,346,695
Percentage	51.09%	47.61%

Kerry
40–50%
50–60%
60–70%
70–80%
80–90%
90–100%
Bush
40–50%
50–60%
60–70%
70–80%
80–90%
90–100%
Tie/no data
President before election
George W. Bush
Republican
Elected President
George W. Bush
Republican

The 2004 United States presidential election in Minnesota took place on November 2, 2004, as part of the 2004 United States presidential election. Voters chose ten representatives, or electors, to the Electoral College, who voted for president and vice president.

Minnesota was won by Democratic nominee John Kerry by a 3.5% margin of victory. Prior to the election, most news organizations considered it as a major swing state in 2004 based on pre-election polling. The state is historically a blue state, as the last Republican to carry the state in a presidential election was Richard Nixon in 1972. However, in 2000 Al Gore carried the state with just 48% of the vote, by a margin of just 2.4%. In 2004, Minnesota was the only state to split its electoral votes, as a faithless elector pledged to Kerry cast a ballot for John Edwards (written as John Ewards), his running mate. The identity and reason for the faithless elector's vote are not known, though fellow Minnesota electors suspected it was a mistake.

== Caucuses ==
- 2004 Republican Party presidential primaries
- 2004 Minnesota Democratic presidential caucuses

== Campaign ==
=== Predictions ===
There were 12 news organizations who made state-by-state predictions of the election. Here are their last predictions before election day.

Source	Ranking
D.C. Political Report	Lean D
Cook Political Report	Tossup
Research 2000	Lean D
Zogby International	Likely D
Washington Post	Tossup
Washington Dispatch	Likely D
Washington Times	Tossup
The New York Times	Tossup
CNN	Likely D
Newsweek	Tossup
Associated Press	Lean D
Rasmussen Reports	Tossup

=== Polling ===
Minnesota was considered a swing state based on its tight poll numbers. In early 2004, Kerry was leading in every poll against Bush, sometimes even reaching 50%. However, in the summer, Kerry was still leading in most of the polls, but the gap was very small. It was not until late October that Bush was leading. In the last poll by Rasmussen Reports, Kerry led with 48% to 47%, but left a lot of undecided voters. In the last three polling average, Kerry led 49% to 47%, but with Bush winning 2 of 3. The last poll average by Real Clear Politics showed Kerry leading 49% to 45%. Overall polls showed a lot of undecided voters. On election day, Kerry won with 51% of the vote.

=== Fundraising ===
Bush raised $2,507,181. Kerry raised $2,635,150.

=== Advertising and visits ===
Both tickets visited the state seven times. A total of $1 million to $3 million was spent each week.

== Analysis ==
Kerry on the campaign trail in Rochester, Minnesota

Minnesota is the state with the longest streak as a blue state, having last backed the Republican presidential nominee in Richard Nixon's 1972 landslide, and even sticking with the Democrats during Ronald Reagan's two landslides in 1980 and 1984. However, in 2000 and 2004 it was considered a battleground state. Both campaigns invested resources in it, and it ultimately stayed in the Democratic column both times, but by relatively narrow margins.

In 2004, the county results were fairly uniform across the state; only a handful of counties had either Bush or Kerry getting over 60% of the vote, and no county had either candidate with over 70% of the vote. Despite winning the state, Kerry won just three of eight congressional districts: Minnesota's 4th congressional district, Minnesota's 5th congressional district, and Minnesota's 8th congressional district.

As of the 2024 presidential election, this is the last election in which Washington County, Olmsted County, and Dakota County voted for the Republican candidate, and the last in which Ramsey County was not the most Democratic county in the state. This was the first time since 1928 that a Republican had won a majority in Anoka County. Bush became the first ever Republican to win the White House without carrying Nicollet County.

== Results ==
2004 United States presidential election in Minnesota
Party	Candidate	Votes	Percentage	Electoral votes
Democratic (DFL)	John Kerry	1,445,014	51.09%	9
Republican	George W. Bush (Inc.)	1,346,695	47.61%	0
Independent	Ralph Nader	18,683	0.66%	0
Libertarian	Michael Badnarik	4,639	0.16%	0
Green	David Cobb	4,408	0.16%	0
Constitution	Michael Peroutka	3,074	0.11%	0
Independent	Write Ins	2,530	0.09%	0
Christian Freedom	Thomas Harens	2,387	0.08%	0
Socialist Equality	Bill Van Auken	539	0.02%	0
Socialist Workers	Roger Calero	416	0.01%	0
Socialist Party USA (Write-in)	Walt Brown (Write-in)	2	0.00%	0
Democratic (DFL)	John Edwards	0	0.00%	1
Totals		2,828,387	100.00%	10
Voter turnout (voting age population)				74.2%

=== By county ===
County	John Kerry DFL		George W. Bush Republican		Various candidates Other parties		Margin		Total votes cast
County	#	%	#	%	#	%	#	%	Total votes cast
Aitkin	4,539	48.02%	4,768	50.44%	145	1.53%	-229	-2.42%	9,452
Anoka	80,226	46.09%	91,853	52.77%	1,987	1.14%	-11,627	-6.68%	174,066
Becker	6,756	40.21%	9,795	58.30%	250	1.49%	-3,039	-18.09%	16,801
Beltrami	10,592	50.13%	10,237	48.45%	302	1.43%	355	1.68%	21,131
Benton	8,059	43.84%	10,043	54.63%	282	1.43%	-1,984	-10.79%	18,384
Big Stone	1,536	50.08%	1,483	48.35%	48	1.57%	53	1.73%	3,067
Blue Earth	16,865	50.92%	15,737	47.52%	517	1.56%	1,128	3.40%	33,119
Brown	5,158	37.44%	8,395	60.93%	225	1.63%	-3,237	-23.49%	13,778
Carlton	11,462	62.52%	6,642	36.23%	230	1.25%	4,820	26.29%	18,334
Carver	16,456	36.24%	28,510	62.78%	445	0.98%	-12,054	-26.54%	45,411
Cass	6,835	42.96%	8,875	55.78%	200	1.26%	-2,040	-12.82%	15,910
Chippewa	3,424	51.83%	3,089	46.76%	93	1.41%	335	5.07%	6,606
Chisago	12,219	43.24%	15,705	55.57%	336	1.19%	-3,486	-12.33%	28,260
Clay	12,989	46.83%	14,365	51.79%	383	1.38%	-1,376	-4.96%	27,737
Clearwater	1,871	42.90%	2,438	55.90%	52	1.19%	-567	-13.00%	4,361
Cook	1,733	52.47%	1,489	45.08%	81	2.45%	244	7.39%	3,303
Cottonwood	2,726	42.80%	3,557	55.85%	86	1.36%	-831	-13.05%	6,369
Crow Wing	14,005	41.75%	19,106	56.96%	434	1.29%	-5,101	-15.21%	33,545
Dakota	104,635	48.48%	108,959	50.48%	2,252	1.04%	-4,324	-2.00%	215,846
Dodge	4,117	41.72%	5,593	56.68%	158	1.60%	-1,476	-14.96%	9,868
Douglas	8,219	40.47%	11,793	58.07%	297	1.46%	-3,574	-17.60%	20,309
Faribault	3,767	43.39%	4,794	55.22%	120	1.38%	-1,027	-11.83%	8,681
Fillmore	5,825	49.79%	5,694	48.67%	179	1.53%	131	1.12%	11,698
Freeborn	9,733	55.09%	7,681	43.48%	252	1.43%	2,052	11.61%	17,666
Goodhue	12,103	47.26%	13,134	51.29%	371	1.45%	-1,031	-4.03%	25,608
Grant	1,856	48.60%	1,893	49.57%	70	1.83%	-37	-0.97%	3,819
Hennepin	383,841	59.33%	255,133	39.43%	8,007	1.24%	128,708	19.90%	646,981
Houston	5,276	47.61%	5,631	50.81%	175	1.58%	-355	-3.20%	11,082
Hubbard	4,741	41.81%	6,444	56.83%	155	1.37%	-1,703	-15.02%	11,340
Isanti	7,883	40.82%	11,190	57.94%	240	1.24%	-3,307	-17.12%	19,313
Itasca	13,290	54.54%	10,705	43.93%	372	1.52%	2,585	10.61%	24,367
Jackson	2,652	45.89%	3,024	52.33%	103	1.78%	-372	-6.44%	5,779
Kanabec	3,592	43.55%	4,527	54.89%	129	1.56%	-935	-11.34%	8,248
Kandiyohi	9,337	43.74%	11,704	54.82%	308	1.45%	-2,367	-11.08%	21,349
Kittson	1,333	49.70%	1,307	48.73%	42	1.57%	26	0.97%	2,682
Koochiching	3,662	50.10%	3,539	48.42%	108	1.48%	123	1.68%	7,309
Lac qui Parle	2,390	52.63%	2,093	46.09%	58	1.27%	297	6.54%	4,541
Lake	4,212	59.57%	2,769	39.16%	90	1.27%	1,433	20.41%	7,071
Lake of the Woods	921	38.38%	1,428	59.50%	51	2.13%	-507	-21.12%	2,400
Le Sueur	6,466	44.83%	7,746	53.70%	212	1.46%	-1,280	-8.87%	14,424
Lincoln	1,558	46.62%	1,736	51.94%	48	1.44%	-178	-5.32%	3,342
Lyon	5,292	41.76%	7,203	56.84%	178	1.40%	-1,911	-15.08%	12,673
McLeod	6,712	36.45%	11,407	61.95%	293	1.60%	-4,695	-25.50%	18,412
Mahnomen	1,339	53.39%	1,132	45.14%	37	1.48%	207	8.25%	2,508
Marshall	2,308	41.50%	3,187	57.30%	67	1.21%	-879	-15.80%	5,562
Martin	4,590	41.55%	6,311	57.13%	146	1.33%	-1,721	-15.58%	11,047
Meeker	5,292	42.91%	6,854	55.57%	188	1.52%	-1,562	-12.66%	12,334
Mille Lacs	5,677	43.45%	7,194	55.06%	194	1.48%	-1,517	-11.61%	13,065
Morrison	6,794	40.54%	9,698	57.87%	266	1.59%	-2,904	-17.33%	16,758
Mower	12,334	60.99%	7,591	37.54%	297	1.47%	4,743	23.45%	20,222
Murray	2,218	44.38%	2,719	54.40%	61	1.22%	-501	-10.02%	4,998
Nicollet	8,797	49.59%	8,689	48.98%	255	1.43%	108	0.61%	17,741
Nobles	3,898	42.35%	5,159	56.05%	147	1.60%	-1,261	-13.70%	9,204
Norman	1,954	51.29%	1,794	47.09%	62	1.62%	160	4.20%	3,810
Olmsted	33,285	46.50%	37,371	52.21%	919	1.29%	-4,086	-5.71%	71,575
Otter Tail	12,038	37.41%	19,734	61.33%	406	1.26%	-7,696	-23.92%	32,178
Pennington	3,117	44.42%	3,767	53.68%	133	1.89%	-650	-9.26%	7,017
Pine	7,228	49.79%	7,033	48.44%	257	1.78%	195	1.35%	14,518
Pipestone	1,900	37.76%	3,066	60.93%	66	1.31%	-1,166	-23.17%	5,032
Polk	6,729	42.95%	8,724	55.68%	215	1.37%	-1,995	-12.73%	15,668
Pope	3,301	49.27%	3,303	49.30%	96	1.43%	-2	-0.03%	6,700
Ramsey	171,846	63.04%	97,096	35.62%	3,635	1.34%	74,750	27.42%	272,577
Red Lake	963	44.24%	1,164	53.47%	50	2.29%	-201	-9.23%	2,177
Redwood	3,104	38.14%	4,898	60.18%	137	1.68%	-1,794	-22.04%	8,139
Renville	3,787	45.36%	4,430	53.06%	132	1.58%	-643	-7.70%	8,349
Rice	16,425	53.42%	13,881	45.15%	439	1.43%	2,544	8.27%	30,745
Rock	2,000	38.53%	3,111	59.93%	80	1.54%	-1,111	-21.40%	5,191
Roseau	2,442	30.87%	5,355	67.69%	114	1.44%	-2,913	-36.82%	7,911
St. Louis	77,958	65.20%	40,112	33.55%	1,495	1.25%	37,846	31.65%	119,565
Scott	23,958	39.51%	36,055	59.46%	626	1.03%	-12,097	-19.95%	60,639
Sherburne	15,816	38.15%	25,182	60.75%	456	1.10%	-9,366	-22.60%	41,454
Sibley	3,109	39.11%	4,669	58.74%	171	2.15%	-1,560	-19.63%	7,949
Stearns	32,659	43.21%	41,726	55.21%	1,192	1.58%	-9,067	-12.00%	75,577
Steele	7,994	42.76%	10,389	55.57%	312	1.67%	-2,395	-12.81%	18,695
Stevens	2,821	47.42%	3,030	50.93%	98	1.64%	-209	-3.51%	5,949
Swift	3,165	55.19%	2,481	43.26%	89	1.55%	684	11.93%	5,735
Todd	5,034	41.21%	6,945	56.86%	235	1.92%	-1,911	-15.65%	12,214
Traverse	1,026	47.92%	1,076	50.26%	39	1.82%	-50	-2.34%	2,141
Wabasha	5,548	46.88%	6,120	51.71%	167	1.41%	-572	-4.83%	11,835
Wadena	2,791	39.35%	4,214	59.41%	88	1.24%	-1,423	-20.06%	7,093
Waseca	4,179	42.64%	5,457	55.68%	164	1.67%	-1,278	-13.04%	9,800
Washington	61,395	47.80%	65,751	51.19%	1,303	1.01%	-4,356	-3.39%	128,449
Watonwan	2,514	45.03%	2,970	53.20%	99	1.77%	-456	-8.17%	5,583
Wilkin	1,169	33.14%	2,303	65.30%	55	1.56%	-1,134	-32.16%	3,527
Winona	14,231	51.90%	12,686	46.26%	505	1.84%	1,545	5.64%	27,422
Wright	22,618	37.99%	36,176	60.77%	740	1.24%	-13,558	-22.78%	59,534
Yellow Medicine	2,799	48.61%	2,878	49.98%	81	1.40%	-79	-1.37%	5,758
Totals	1,445,014	51.09%	1,346,695	47.61%	36,678	1.40%	98,319	3.48%	2,828,387

==== Counties that flipped from Democratic to Republican ====
- Aitkin (largest municipality: Aitkin)
- Lincoln (largest municipality: Tyler)

==== Counties that flipped from Republican to Democratic ====
- Beltrami (largest municipality: Bemidji)
- Blue Earth (largest municipality: Mankato)
- Chippewa (largest municipality: Montevideo)
- Cook (largest municipality: Grand Marais)
- Kittson (largest city: Hallock)
- Koochiching (largest city: International Falls)
- Mahnomen (largest municipality: Mahnomen)
- Nicollet (largest municipality: North Mankato)
- Norman (largest municipality: Ada)

=== By congressional district ===
Despite losing the state, Bush won five of eight congressional districts, including one held by a Democrat.

District	Bush	Kerry	Representative
1st	51%	47%	Gil Gutknecht
2nd	54%	45%	John Kline
3rd	51%	48%	Jim Ramstad
4th	37%	62%	Betty McCollum
5th	28%	71%	Martin Olav Sabo
6th	57%	42%	Mark Kennedy
7th	55%	43%	Collin Peterson
8th	46%	53%	Jim Oberstar

== Electors ==
Technically the voters of Minnesota cast their ballots for electors: representatives to the Electoral College. Minnesota is allocated 10 electors because it has eight congressional districts and two senators. All candidates who appear on the ballot or qualify to receive write-in votes must submit a list of 10 electors, who pledge to vote for their candidate and their running mate. Whoever wins the majority of votes in the state is awarded all 10 electoral votes. Their chosen electors then vote for president and vice president. Although electors are pledged to their candidate and running mate, they are not obligated to vote for them. An elector who votes for someone other than their candidate is known as a faithless elector.

The electors of each state and the District of Columbia met on December 13, 2004, to cast their votes for president and vice president. The Electoral College itself never meets as one body. Instead, the electors from each state and the District of Columbia met in their respective capitols.

The following were the members of the Electoral College from the state.

1. Sonja Berg
2. Vi Grooms-Alban
3. Matthew Little
4. Michael Meuers
5. Tim O'Brien
6. Lil Ortendahl
7. Everett Pettiford
8. Jean Schiebel
9. Frank Simon
10. Chandler Harrison Stevens

All ten were pledged for the Kerry/Edwards ticket, but one made a mistake and ended up voting for "John Ewards" for president, while also correctly spelling Edwards' name for vice president. Regardless of the error, the ballot was officially tabulated as an electoral vote for Edwards in both offices. As the electors cast secret ballots, it is unlikely that the identity of the faithless elector will ever be known unless the elector claims responsibility. In 2016, Jean Schiebel told MinnPost that she and some of her fellow electors had an inkling who it was, but declined to publicly identify anyone. The same article also noted that another ballot had both Kerry and Edwards' names written on the line for president, but this did not affect how the vote was interpreted.

As a result of the erroneous vote, Minnesota state law was amended to provide for public balloting of the electors' votes, and invalidation of a vote cast for someone other than the candidate to whom the elector is pledged.

== See also ==
- United States presidential elections in Minnesota
