= 2004 United States presidential election in Pennsylvania =

- November 2, 2004
- Turnout: 68.9% (▲5.9 pp)

Nominee	John Kerry	George W. Bush
Party	Democratic	Republican
Home state	Massachusetts	Texas
Running mate	John Edwards	Dick Cheney
Electoral vote	21	0
Popular vote	2,938,095	2,793,847
Percentage	50.92%	48.42%

Kerry
40–50%
50–60%
60–70%
70–80%
80–90%
Bush
40–50%
50–60%
60–70%
70–80%
80–90%
90–100%
Tie
President before election
George W. Bush
Republican
Elected President
George W. Bush
Republican

The 2004 United States presidential election in Pennsylvania took place on November 2, 2004, and was part of the 2004 United States presidential election. Voters chose 21 representatives, or electors to the Electoral College, who voted for president and vice president.

Pennsylvania was won by Democratic nominee John Kerry by a 2.50% margin of victory. Although no Republican carried this state in a presidential election since Bush's father George H. W. Bush in 1988, early polling showed the race was a toss-up, thus was considered as a possible target for the Republicans. Prior to the election, most news organizations considered this a toss-up, or a crucial swing state. Later polling favored Kerry, leading half of the news organizations to predict that Kerry would win the state, but the other half still considered it a swing state. Although the Commonwealth of Pennsylvania voted for the Democratic presidential nominee in six subsequent elections since 1992, the margins of victory had become smaller over the past elections. On election day, Kerry won the state with 50.92% of the vote, but won only 13 of the 67 counties in Pennsylvania. Most of these 13 counties have the highest populations in the commonwealth. The biggest key to Kerry's victory was winning Philadelphia County with 80.44% of the vote.

Bush was the first president elected to two terms in office without carrying Pennsylvania either time since Woodrow Wilson in 1912 and 1916, and is to date the only Republican presidential candidate to win the presidency without carrying the state at least once, as well as the most recent Republican to win without the state. Although Pennsylvania was also not carried by the winner of the 2000 presidential race, this election also marked the first time since 1968 that Pennsylvania voted against the winner of the national popular vote.

As of 2024, this is the most recent election to date in which Pennsylvania would vote for the losing candidate, thus the state is tied with Wisconsin and Michigan for the longest bellwether streak in the nation. This was also only the third and most recent time since 1948 (after 2000 and 1968) that it would vote for the losing candidate.

== Primaries ==
=== Eligibility ===
In order to vote in the primary, one must have been:

1. "A citizen of the United States for at least one month before the next primary, special, municipal, or general election."
2. "A resident of Pennsylvania and the election district in which the individual desires to register and vote for at least 30 days before the next primary, special, municipal, or general election."
3. "At least 18 years of age on or before the day of the next primary, special, municipal, or general election."
4. A registered member of the party holding the primary

Convicted felons could not vote from prison and were not allowed to register to vote for five years after being released from prison.

=== Registration ===
Individuals could register to vote at County Voter Registration offices, through the mail, at a Department of Transportation office, or at various other government agency offices.

Voters must have been registered 30 days prior to the election in order to be eligible to vote.

=== Democratic primary election ===
The Democratic primary took place on April 27, 2004. It was open to registered Democrats only.

==== Results ====
100% of precincts reporting
Candidate	Votes	Percentage	Delegates
John Kerry	585,683	74.1%	150
Howard Dean	79,799	10.1%	1
John Edwards	76,762	9.7%	0
Dennis Kucinich	30,110	3.8%	0
Lyndon LaRouche	17,528	2.2%	0
Uncommitted	-	2.2%	27
Total	789,882	100%	178

Note: 27 delegates remained uncommitted until they reached the floor of the convention. Kerry eventually received all 178 delegates from Pennsylvania.

=== Republican primary election ===
The Republican primary took place on April 27, 2004. It was open to registered Republicans only. Incumbent President George W. Bush ran unopposed.

== General election ==
=== Predictions ===
There were 12 news organizations who made state-by-state predictions of the election. Here are their last predictions before election day.

Source	Ranking
D.C. Political Report	Toss-up
Associated Press	Toss-up
CNN	Likely D
Cook Political Report	Toss-up
Newsweek	Lean D
New York Times	Lean D
Rasmussen Reports	Toss-up
Research 2000	Lean D
Washington Post	Toss-up
Washington Times	Toss-up
Zogby International	Likely D
Washington Dispatch	Likely D

=== Polling ===
Al Gore won Pennsylvania in 2000 with just over 50% of the vote. In late October 2004, the state was split at 47% on whether or not to approve of Bush. But Kerry won the poll 48% to 46% in the last Mason Dixon poll. Throughout the election of 2004, Kerry won most of the polls in the upper 40% to lower 50% range. However, Bush polled within the margin of error, usually in the mid 40% range. In the last Real Clear Politics average Kerry was leading with 48% and by almost a 1% margin.

=== Fundraising ===
Bush raised $5,030,349. Kerry raised $4,998,861.

=== Advertising and visits ===
President Bush campaigned heavily and visited the state of Pennsylvania over twenty times in 2004. It was not enough to flip the state, as John Kerry won the undecided Pennsylvanians. He won the state's electors with almost 51% of the vote, outperforming Vice President Al Gore's performance four years earlier.

== Analysis ==
This Kerry victory can be attributed to the overwhelmingly Democratic cities of Philadelphia, Pittsburgh, and Erie. Although Kerry-held cities that voted for the Senator by narrow margins assisted him in advancing his margin over President Bush, many political analysts underscored the fact that if Philadelphia were excluded, President George W. Bush would have won Pennsylvania by a fairly slim margin, with 2,663,748 versus 2,395,890 for Kerry. Although Pennsylvania is closely divided in most elections, it did not vote Republican in a presidential election from 1992 to 2012. As of 2026, Bush remains the only Republican to win two terms without carrying Pennsylvania at least once.

Philadelphia and Pittsburgh were the biggest contributors to Kerry's victory in Pennsylvania. However, many independents in suburban Philadelphia counties (Bucks, Delaware, Montgomery, and somewhat in Chester) voted for Kerry, which may well have been the deciding factor. Kerry also had narrow margins of victory around cities like Allentown, Scranton, Erie, and the traditionally Democratic Pittsburgh suburbs; he also garnered many votes in certain rural areas such as parts of the Poconos and the Laurel Highlands, and in cities like Reading, Johnstown, Harrisburg, and State College. Bush's margins were extremely large in central Pennsylvania and the sparsely populated Northern Tier, with traditional GOP cities such as Lancaster, Lebanon, York, Altoona, Huntingdon, and Williamsport strongly throwing their support behind him. This area, along with rural western Maryland, was the most conservative in the Mid-Atlantic.

As of the 2024, this is the last presidential election that the Democratic candidate won Washington County, Beaver County and Fayette County. This is also the last election in which Dauphin County and Centre County voted for the Republican candidate. This is also the last time that Chester County gave a majority to a Republican, although Mitt Romney did win the county with a plurality in 2012. This is the last time Democrats won a majority of congressional districts in the state.

== Results ==
2004 United States presidential election in Pennsylvania
Party	Candidate	Votes	Percentage	Electoral votes
Democratic	John Kerry	2,938,095	50.92%	21
Republican	George W. Bush (incumbent)	2,793,847	48.42%	0
Libertarian	Michael Badnarik	21,185	0.37%	0
Green	David Cobb	6,319	0.11%	0
Constitution	Michael Peroutka	6,318	0.11%	0
Independent	Ralph Nader (write-in) (Note: Nader initially qualified to appear on the ballot via petition, but on October 13, 2004, a ruling of the Commonwealth Court of Pennsylvania removed him from the ballot after finding that most of the petition's signatures were invalid or forged.)	2,656	0.05%	0
Independent	Write-ins	1,170	0.02%	0
Totals		5,769,590	100.00%	21
Voter turnout (voting age population)				60.5%

=== By county ===
County	John Kerry Democratic		George W. Bush Republican		Michael J. Badnarik Libertarian		David Cobb Green		Michael Peroutka Constitution		Margin		Total votes cast
County	#	%	#	%	#	%	#	%	#	%	#	%	Total votes cast
Adams	13,764	32.59%	28,247	66.89%	95	0.22%	63	0.15%	59	0.14%	-14,483	-34.30%	42,228
Allegheny	368,912	57.15%	271,925	42.13%	3,573	0.55%	551	0.09%	508	0.08%	96,987	15.02%	645,469
Armstrong	12,025	38.67%	18,925	60.86%	56	0.18%	41	0.13%	50	0.16%	-6,900	-22.19%	31,097
Beaver	42,146	51.06%	39,916	48.36%	165	0.20%	141	0.17%	175	0.21%	2,230	2.70%	82,543
Bedford	6,016	26.53%	16,606	73.22%	19	0.08%	15	0.07%	23	0.10%	-10,590	-46.69%	22,679
Berks	76,309	46.39%	87,122	52.97%	551	0.33%	295	0.18%	210	0.13%	-10,813	-6.58%	164,487
Blair	18,105	33.42%	35,751	65.99%	210	0.39%	54	0.10%	58	0.11%	-17,646	-32.57%	54,178
Bradford	8,590	33.49%	16,942	66.05%	57	0.22%	27	0.11%	36	0.14%	-8,352	-32.56%	25,652
Bucks	163,438	51.10%	154,469	48.30%	1,338	0.42%	308	0.10%	263	0.08%	8,969	2.80%	319,816
Butler	30,090	35.22%	54,959	64.34%	182	0.21%	83	0.10%	111	0.13%	-24,869	-29.12%	85,425
Cambria	32,591	48.66%	34,048	50.83%	159	0.24%	86	0.13%	99	0.15%	-1,457	-2.17%	66,983
Cameron	794	33.00%	1,599	66.46%	8	0.33%	3	0.12%	2	0.08%	-805	-33.46%	2,406
Carbon	12,223	48.81%	12,519	49.99%	229	0.91%	42	0.17%	30	0.12%	-296	-1.18%	25,043
Centre	30,733	47.74%	33,133	51.47%	227	0.35%	90	0.14%	70	0.11%	-2,400	-3.73%	64,374
Chester	109,708	47.53%	120,036	52.00%	632	0.27%	263	0.11%	184	0.08%	-10,328	-4.47%	230,823
Clarion	6,049	35.20%	11,063	64.38%	37	0.22%	19	0.11%	16	0.09%	-5,014	-29.18%	17,184
Clearfield	13,518	39.49%	20,533	59.98%	68	0.20%	47	0.14%	67	0.20%	-7,015	-20.49%	34,233
Clinton	5,823	41.69%	8,035	57.53%	83	0.59%	13	0.09%	13	0.09%	-2,212	-15.84%	13,967
Columbia	10,679	39.74%	16,052	59.74%	57	0.21%	39	0.15%	42	0.16%	-5,373	-20.00%	26,869
Crawford	16,013	41.79%	21,965	57.32%	176	0.46%	63	0.16%	105	0.27%	-5,952	-15.53%	38,322
Cumberland	37,928	35.75%	67,648	63.77%	265	0.25%	112	0.11%	129	0.12%	-29,720	-28.02%	106,082
Dauphin	55,299	45.62%	65,296	53.87%	274	0.23%	171	0.14%	168	0.14%	-9,997	-8.25%	121,208
Delaware	162,601	57.15%	120,425	42.32%	946	0.33%	312	0.11%	254	0.09%	42,176	14.83%	284,538
Elk	6,602	45.37%	7,872	54.10%	25	0.17%	20	0.14%	31	0.21%	-1,270	-8.73%	14,550
Erie	67,921	53.95%	57,372	45.57%	334	0.27%	159	0.13%	112	0.09%	10,549	8.38%	125,898
Fayette	29,120	53.23%	25,045	45.78%	447	0.82%	43	0.08%	52	0.10%	4,075	7.45%	54,707
Forest	989	38.44%	1,571	61.06%	8	0.31%	3	0.12%	2	0.08%	-582	-22.62%	2,573
Franklin	16,562	28.28%	41,817	71.40%	90	0.15%	44	0.08%	56	0.10%	-25,255	-43.12%	58,569
Fulton	1,475	23.52%	4,772	76.10%	15	0.24%	4	0.06%	5	0.08%	-3,297	-52.58%	6,271
Greene	7,674	49.30%	7,786	50.02%	32	0.21%	44	0.28%	29	0.19%	-112	-0.72%	15,565
Huntingdon	5,879	32.56%	12,126	67.15%	20	0.11%	19	0.11%	14	0.08%	-6,247	-34.59%	18,058
Indiana	15,831	43.67%	20,254	55.88%	77	0.21%	47	0.13%	39	0.11%	-4,423	-12.21%	36,248
Jefferson	6,073	31.05%	13,371	68.36%	58	0.30%	28	0.14%	30	0.15%	-7,298	-37.31%	19,560
Juniata	2,797	27.95%	7,144	71.40%	30	0.30%	15	0.15%	20	0.20%	-4,347	-43.45%	10,006
Lackawanna	59,573	56.30%	44,766	42.30%	1,288	1.22%	113	0.11%	79	0.07%	14,807	14.00%	105,819
Lancaster	74,328	33.58%	145,591	65.77%	705	0.32%	255	0.12%	399	0.18%	-71,263	-32.19%	221,372
Lawrence	21,387	49.23%	21,938	50.50%	56	0.13%	26	0.06%	35	0.08%	-551	-1.27%	43,442
Lebanon	18,109	32.53%	37,089	66.63%	323	0.58%	51	0.09%	93	0.17%	-18,980	-34.10%	55,665
Lehigh	73,940	50.96%	70,160	48.36%	638	0.44%	160	0.11%	193	0.13%	3,780	2.60%	145,091
Luzerne	69,573	51.15%	64,953	47.75%	1,195	0.88%	180	0.13%	127	0.09%	4,620	3.40%	136,028
Lycoming	15,681	31.31%	33,961	67.81%	279	0.56%	77	0.15%	51	0.10%	-18,280	-36.50%	50,081
McKean	6,294	36.12%	10,941	62.79%	148	0.85%	23	0.13%	20	0.11%	-4,647	-26.67%	17,426
Mercer	24,831	48.16%	26,311	51.03%	149	0.29%	133	0.26%	140	0.27%	-1,480	-2.87%	51,564
Mifflin	4,889	29.10%	11,726	69.79%	144	0.86%	20	0.12%	23	0.14%	-6,837	-40.69%	16,802
Monroe	27,967	49.64%	27,971	49.65%	287	0.51%	64	0.11%	53	0.09%	-4	-0.01%	56,342
Montgomery	222,048	55.57%	175,741	43.98%	1,088	0.27%	349	0.09%	365	0.09%	46,307	11.59%	399,591
Montour	2,666	34.97%	4,903	64.31%	34	0.45%	10	0.13%	11	0.14%	-2,237	-29.34%	7,624
Northampton	63,446	50.02%	62,102	48.96%	885	0.70%	187	0.15%	120	0.09%	1,344	1.06%	126,849
Northumberland	14,602	39.32%	22,262	59.95%	139	0.37%	47	0.13%	84	0.23%	-7,660	-20.63%	37,134
Perry	5,423	27.91%	13,919	71.65%	36	0.19%	24	0.12%	25	0.13%	-8,496	-43.74%	19,427
Philadelphia	542,205	80.44%	130,099	19.30%	895	0.13%	483	0.07%	387	0.06%	412,106	61.14%	674,069
Pike	8,656	40.64%	12,444	58.43%	144	0.68%	31	0.15%	24	0.11%	-3,788	-17.79%	21,299
Potter	2,268	28.49%	5,640	70.84%	18	0.23%	9	0.11%	27	0.34%	-3,372	-42.35%	7,962
Schuylkill	29,231	44.79%	35,640	54.60%	186	0.28%	129	0.20%	83	0.13%	-6,409	-9.81%	65,269
Snyder	4,348	29.02%	10,566	70.52%	33	0.22%	18	0.12%	18	0.12%	-6,218	-41.50%	14,983
Somerset	12,842	34.92%	23,802	64.72%	48	0.13%	38	0.10%	48	0.13%	-10,960	-29.80%	36,778
Sullivan	1,213	36.93%	2,056	62.59%	10	0.30%	5	0.15%	1	0.03%	-843	-25.66%	3,285
Susquehanna	7,351	38.61%	11,573	60.78%	54	0.28%	33	0.17%	29	0.15%	-4,222	-22.17%	19,040
Tioga	5,437	30.94%	12,019	68.40%	49	0.28%	23	0.13%	43	0.24%	-6,582	-37.46%	17,571
Union	5,700	35.35%	10,334	64.09%	46	0.29%	30	0.19%	13	0.08%	-4,634	-28.74%	16,123
Venango	9,024	38.14%	14,472	61.17%	93	0.39%	31	0.13%	39	0.16%	-5,448	-23.03%	23,659
Warren	8,044	41.74%	10,999	57.07%	79	0.41%	34	0.18%	117	0.61%	-2,955	-15.33%	19,273
Washington	48,225	50.14%	47,673	49.57%	142	0.15%	59	0.06%	78	0.08%	552	0.57%	96,177
Wayne	8,060	36.69%	13,713	62.43%	136	0.62%	23	0.10%	35	0.16%	-5,653	-25.74%	21,967
Westmoreland	77,774	43.52%	100,087	56.01%	474	0.27%	155	0.09%	206	0.12%	-22,313	-12.49%	178,696
Wyoming	4,982	38.82%	7,782	60.65%	20	0.16%	22	0.17%	26	0.20%	-2,800	-21.83%	12,832
York	63,701	35.53%	114,270	63.74%	821	0.46%	213	0.12%	264	0.15%	-50,569	-28.21%	179,269
Totals	2,938,095	50.92%	2,793,847	48.42%	21,185	0.37%	6,319	0.11%	6,318	0.11%	144,248	2.50%	5,769,590

==== Counties that flipped from Democratic to Republican ====
- Cambria (largest municipality: Johnstown)
- Carbon (largest municipality: Lehighton)
- Greene (largest municipality: Waynesburg)
- Lawrence (largest municipality: New Castle)
- Mercer (largest municipality: Hermitage)

=== By congressional district ===
Kerry won ten of 19 congressional districts, including four held by Republicans. Bush won nine districts, including one held by a Democrat.

District	Bush	Kerry	Representative
1st	15%	84%	Bob Brady
2nd	12%	87%	Chaka Fattah
3rd	53%	47%	Phil English
4th	54%	45%	Melissa Hart
5th	61%	39%	John E. Peterson
6th	48%	52%	Jim Gerlach
7th	47%	53%	Curt Weldon
8th	48%	51%	James C. Greenwood
8th	48%	51%	Mike Fitzpatrick
9th	67%	33%	Bill Shuster
10th	60%	40%	Don Sherwood
11th	47%	53%	Paul Kanjorski
12th	49%	51%	John Murtha
13th	43%	56%	Joe Hoeffel
13th	43%	56%	Allyson Schwartz
14th	30%	69%	Mike Doyle
15th	50%	50%	Pat Toomey
15th	50%	50%	Charlie Dent
16th	61%	38%	Joe Pitts
17th	58%	42%	Tim Holden
18th	54%	46%	Tim Murphy
19th	64%	36%	Todd Platts

== Electors ==
Technically the voters of Pennsylvania cast their ballots for electors: representatives to the Electoral College. Pa. is allocated 21 electors because it has 19 congressional districts and 2 senators. All candidates who appear on the ballot or qualify to receive write-in votes must submit a list of 21 electors, who pledge to vote for their candidate and his or her running mate. Whoever wins the majority of votes in the state is awarded all 21 electoral votes. Their chosen electors then vote for president and vice president. Although electors are pledged to their candidate and running mate, they are not obligated to vote for them. An elector who votes for someone other than his or her candidate is known as a faithless elector.

The electors of each state and the District of Columbia met on December 13, 2004, to cast their votes for president and vice president. The Electoral College itself never meets as one body. Instead the electors from each state and the District of Columbia met in their respective capitols.

The following were the members of the Electoral College from the state. All 21 were pledged for Kerry/Edwards.

1. Lynne Abraham
2. Richard Bloomingdale
3. Blondell Reynolds Brown
4. Robert Casey Jr.
5. Eileen Connelly
6. H. William DeWeese
7. John Dougherty
8. Richard E. Filippi
9. William George
10. Renee Gillinger
11. Jennifer Mann
12. Robert J. Mellow
13. Dan Onorato
14. Juan Ramos
15. Stephen R. Reed
16. T.J. Rooney
17. Jonathan Saidel
18. John F. Street
19. Rosemary Trump
20. Sala Udin
21. Constance H. Williams

== See also ==
- United States presidential elections in Pennsylvania
