= White House shakeup (2004) =

Changes in George W. Bush's cabinet after 2004 election

Within a week after the 2004 United States presidential election, many members of President George W. Bush's cabinet announced their resignation in what major media outlets and Bush himself called the White House shakeup. Several top advisers were also involved, although they are not technically cabinet members.

== Resignations ==
Attorney General John Ashcroft and Secretary of Commerce Donald Evans were the first to announce their resignations on November 9, 2004. A week later, on November 14, several more announced their plans to resign: Secretary of State Colin Powell, Agriculture Secretary Ann Veneman, Education Secretary Rod Paige, and Energy Secretary Spencer Abraham. Tom Ridge announced his plans to resign as the first Secretary of Homeland Security on November 30.

In December, two more followed. Secretary of Health and Human Services Tommy Thompson announced his resignation on December 3. On December 8, after a period of some speculation that Treasury Secretary John W. Snow would resign his post, the White House stated that Snow had been asked to stay on as Secretary through Bush's second term. On that same day, Secretary of Veterans Affairs Anthony Principi announced his resignation.

After the resignation on March 28, 2006 of White House Chief of Staff Andrew Card and his replacement by Josh Bolten, there was widespread expectation that Bolten would conduct a housecleaning. In the months after Bolten's arrival, Snow (May 25), Secretary of the Interior Gale Norton (March 31) and Secretary of Transportation Norman Mineta (June 23, 2006) announced their resignations. On November 8, 2006, a day after the U.S. midterm elections, Secretary of Defense Donald Rumsfeld resigned following numerous calls for his resignation from the military leadership and general public pressure. On August 27, 2007 Attorney General Alberto Gonzales announced his decision to resign from the Cabinet after calls for his resignation.

Altogether, twelve of the fifteen cabinet-level department heads resigned and were replaced. Remaining were Secretary of Labor Elaine Chao, and Secretary of Housing and Urban Development Alphonso Jackson.

I. Lewis 'Scooter' Libby resigned after 4 felony convictions.

== Nominations ==
Bush's first two selections of replacements for the departing cabinet members drew some criticism and some praise. He selected White House Counsel Alberto R. Gonzales for Attorney General and Condoleezza Rice for Secretary of State. The two nominations are both historical for minorities in their own right. Rice would be the first African American woman to serve as Secretary of State, while Gonzales would become the first Hispanic Attorney General. Despite the historical implications of their nominations, both of them have drawn criticism for actions they took while in their previous government positions. Gonzales's nomination angered some Bush supporters because some of his rulings as a Supreme Court justice in Texas could be considered pro-choice, while many Republicans (including Bush himself) are against abortion.

Next to be nominated was Domestic Policy Advisor Margaret Spellings on November 17. She is one of the principal authors of the No Child Left Behind Act. She would replace Paige as Education Secretary. Then on November 29, Carlos Gutierrez, the CEO at Kellogg since 1999, was picked to be the new Commerce Secretary, replacing Donald Evans. Cuban-born, Gutierrez began at Kellogg selling cereal out of a van in Mexico City. Now an American citizen, Gutierrez would be taking a $199,825,000 pay cut at the new position. Bush called Gutierrez "One of America's most respected business leaders. He is a great American success story."

Republican Governor Mike Johanns of Nebraska was nominated by Bush on December 2 to replace outgoing United States Secretary of Agriculture Ann Veneman. There had been some speculation that Bush would tap Democratic Senator Ben Nelson, also of Nebraska, to fill the post. Nelson reportedly turned down Bush's offer, choosing instead to remain in the Senate. It is worth noting that had Nelson accepted Bush's offer, the Democratic Party would likely have lost a seat in the Senate, as Nelson's replacement would have been nominated by Governor Johanns, and would have been a Republican.

On December 9, Bush named Jim Nicholson, U.S. ambassador to the Vatican, as his nominee for Veterans Affairs Secretary. Sam Bodman, Deputy Secretary of Commerce and Deputy Secretary of the Treasury, was nominated December 10 by the president to become the new Secretary of Energy. Michael O. Leavitt, the current Administrator of the Environmental Protection Agency was nominated the same day to succeed Tommy Thompson as Secretary of Health and Human Services.

On December 2, 2004, Bernard Kerik was nominated by Bush as the next Homeland Security secretary. However, on December 10, after a week of press scrutiny, Kerik withdrew acceptance of the nomination citing personal reasons and a potential controversy over the immigration status of a nanny and housekeeper he had employed. In a situation reminiscent of the Nannygate matter of 1993, Kerik had failed to pay taxes for the worker, who may have been an illegal immigrant to the United States. However, the nanny has not yet been located, leading some to believe the nanny story was an invention created to divert attention away from Kerik's other problems. Other controversies which may have contributed to Kerik's declining the nomination included an alleged outstanding arrest warrant from 1998 stemming from unpaid bills on the maintenance of a condominium (documents regarding this warrant were faxed to the White House less than three hours before Kerik submitted his withdrawal of acceptance to the President) and questions regarding Kerik's sale of stock in Taser International shortly before the release of an Amnesty International report critical of the company's stun-gun product. Kerik has also been accused of being involved in at least two extramarital affairs. One of the affairs occurred in the aftermath of 9/11. Kerik allegedly used an apartment intended for police business that overlooked The Pile for the affair.

On January 12, five weeks after the withdraw of Kerik's nomination, Bush announced his next choice for director of Homeland Security, Michael Chertoff. Chertoff was a judge for the United States Court of Appeals for the Third Circuit, which handles appeals from New Jersey, Delaware, Pennsylvania and the Virgin Islands. Before becoming a judge he was Assistant Attorney General for the Department of Justice's criminal division from 2001 to 2003. Also, between 1994 and 1996, Chertoff was counsel to the GOP-run Senate Whitewater Committee investigating the business dealings of President Clinton and then-First Lady Hillary Clinton.

On November 6, the same day as Rumsfeld's resignation, President Bush nominated Robert Gates former CIA director to replace him. He was confirmed by the Senate on December 6, 2006 by a vote of 95 - 2. The two senators voting against him were Bunning and Santorum.

== Senate hearings ==
Gonzales's hearings began on January 6, 2005. During the hearings, the main opposition to Gonzales's nomination came from those who accused him of giving advice to President Bush that led to abuse of prisoners in U.S. custody, and that he condoned torture as an interrogation tactic. Gonzales denied these charges. Democrats, unable to block Gonzales' confirmation by vote threatened to filibuster; however, they retracted the threat within a week. They were successful in delaying the vote until after the President's State of the Union Address on February 2.

Rice's hearing began on January 19. During Rice's nine- hour-long interrogation, she expressed confidence that Iraq could regain stability and independence, expressed disgust for the reports of torture by guards at the Abu Ghraib prison but did not mention banning any of forms of torture, and expressed confidence that North Korea could be persuaded by its neighbors to give up its nuclear weapons program. She was criticized for seemingly contradictory statements she made about going to war with Iraq. The small group of Democrats that opposed her included Senators Edward Kennedy and John Kerry.

Chertoff's confirmation hearing was held on February 2. He was questioned by the Homeland Security and Governmental Affairs Committee as to his knowledge of abuse by guards of Iraqis in detention facilities. He claimed to have no "personal" knowledge of the accusations.

== Confirmations ==
Margaret Spellings was confirmed by the Senate as Secretary of Education on January 20. On the same day, Mike Johanns was confirmed as Secretary of Agriculture.

Carlos Gutierrez was confirmed by voice vote on January 23.

Condoleezza Rice was confirmed as Secretary of State on January 26 into the new cabinet by the Senate by 85 to 13 vote . Although there was a small contingent of Democrats who opposed her confirmation, there was never any doubt that she would be confirmed. No nominee for Secretary of State has ever not been confirmed, and there was never a second choice nominee mentioned. However, she did receive the most "no" votes since Henry Kissinger, who received 7.

The same day, Jim Nicholson was confirmed as Secretary of Veterans Affairs and Michael O. Leavitt was confirmed as Secretary of Health and Human Services.

Sam Bodman was confirmed by the Senate on January 31.

Alberto Gonzales was confirmed 60–36 on February 3, 2005 with all of the "no" votes coming from Democrats. He received the second most "no" votes of any attorney general nominee. His predecessor, John Ashcroft, received 42 "no" votes just four years and three days earlier. However, Ashcroft had more support from Democrats, receiving 8 "yes" votes while Gonzales only got 6.

Michael Chertoff was unanimously approved for the position of Secretary of the Department of Homeland Security by the Senate on February 15, 2005.

Robert Gates was approved for the position of Secretary of Defense by the Senate on December 6, 2006.
