= Sorry Everybody =

Political website

Sorry Everybody was a website created after the 2004 United States presidential election, which invited U.S. citizens to apologize to the world in advance for the actions of George W. Bush in the next four years. It featured an image gallery of Americans holding apology notes. "Sorry Everybody" inspired several Bush supporters to create spinoffs expressing that they were not sorry.

The website was created by James Zetlen, an American neuroscience student who was at the time in the third year of his undergraduate program at the University of Southern California in Los Angeles. The first photo was taken by Zetlen of himself, in his home in Los Angeles on November 3, 2004, after John Kerry conceding in the 2004 U.S. presidential election. Zetlen's photo inspired thousands more similar contributions from U.S. citizens, and he compiled a gallery of 8,000 of these photos on his website and published a 256-page book containing approximately 1,000 of them, entitled Sorry Everybody: An Apology to the World for the Re-election of George W. Bush.

Although the Sorry Everybody movement originally began as a specific reaction to a political movement, it also showed a much more broader shift in how many Americans were starting to use the internet for expressing their displeasure. In the early 2000s, platforms online were still fairly new environments for political participation. The Sorry Everybody website showcased just how regular-day Americans used imagery and words to express their emotions and disagreements politically outside of traditional media norms. Rather than relying on protests or interviews for example, the website allowed individuals to use handwritten signs and images to show their own perspectives to a much broader audience.

Additionally, the project highlighted another dimension of political communication that had not been talked about much; the emotional dimension. Instead of utilizing partisan strategy or policy arguments, the website contained emotional feelings such as anger and embarrassment. Due to the emotional nature of the site, it illustrated how political engagement is not always rational, but is more symbolic and personal. Early digital media experts observed that early participation sites, like Sorry Everybody, sparked more forms of activism online. Hashtag campaigns and viral political content was thus born from the site. In a sense, Sorry Everybody can be interpreted as a primary example of how political communication was networked among others. American citizens could openly share their opinions, shaping the public discourse surrounded by President George Bush.

After Barack Obama's victory in the 2008 presidential election, the site's title changed to "Hello Everybody," and Zetlen invited submissions again—this time of celebratory pictures of Americans reintroducing themselves to the world.
