= 2004 United States presidential election =

Re-election of George W. Bush

- November 2, 2004

538 members of the Electoral College 270 electoral votes needed to win
- Opinion polls
- Turnout: 60.1% (▲5.9 pp)
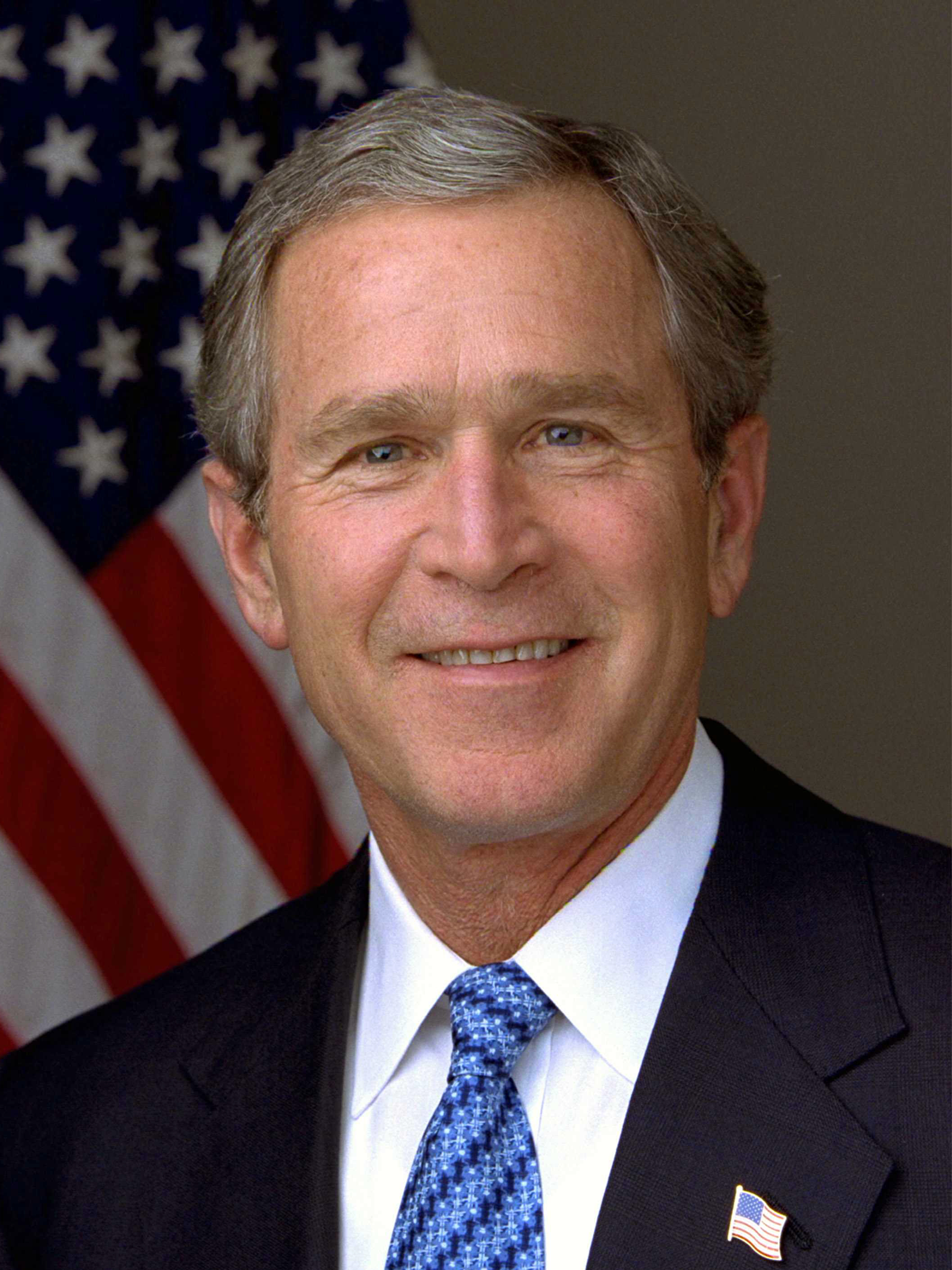

Nominee	George W. Bush	John Kerry
Party	Republican	Democratic
Home state	Texas	Massachusetts
Running mate	Dick Cheney	John Edwards
Electoral vote	286	251 (Note: A Democratic faithless elector from Minnesota voted for Edwards for both president and vice president. As a result, Kerry had 251 electoral votes instead of the pledged 252.)
States carried	31	19 + DC
Popular vote	62,040,610	59,028,444
Percentage	50.7%	48.3%
- Presidential election results map. Red denotes states won by Bush/Cheney and blue denotes those won by Kerry/Edwards. Light blue represents the sole electoral vote for John Edwards by a Minnesota faithless elector. Numbers indicate electoral votes cast by each state and the District of Columbia.
President before election
George W. Bush
Republican
Elected President
George W. Bush
Republican

A presidential election was held in the United States on November 2, 2004. Incumbent Republican president George W. Bush and his running mate, incumbent vice president Dick Cheney, were re-elected to a second term; they narrowly defeated the Democratic ticket of Massachusetts junior senator John Kerry and North Carolina senior senator John Edwards.

Bush and Cheney were re-nominated by their party with no difficulty. Meanwhile, the Democrats engaged in a competitive primary. Kerry emerged as the early front-runner but was faced with serious opposition by former Vermont governor Howard Dean, who briefly surged ahead of Kerry in the polls. Kerry won the first set of primaries in January and re-emerged as the front-runner, and Dean dropped out in February. Kerry clinched his party's nomination in March after a series of primary victories over runner-up Edwards, whom he ultimately selected to be his running mate.

The September 11 attacks in 2001 decisively reshaped Bush's foreign policy goals and garnered him near-universal support early in his term. However, by 2004 his management of the war on terror attracted serious debate, particularly over his handling of the 2003 invasion of Iraq. Bush presented himself as a decisive leader and attacked Kerry as a "flip-flopper"; Kerry had voted to authorize the invasion, but criticized Bush's conduct of the Iraq War. Domestic issues were debated as well, including the economy and jobs, health care, abortion, same-sex marriage, and embryonic stem cell research.

Bush won by a narrow margin of 35 electoral votes and took 50.7% of the popular vote. Bush swept the South and the Mountain states and took the crucial swing states of Ohio, Iowa, and New Mexico, the last two flipping Republican. Although Kerry flipped New Hampshire, Bush won both more electoral votes and states than in 2000. Ohio was the tipping-point state, and was considered to be the state that allowed Bush to win reelection. Some aspects of the election process were subject to controversy, although not to the degree seen in the 2000 presidential election. Bush won Florida by a 5% margin, a significant improvement over his razor-thin victory margin in the state four years earlier that had led to a legal challenge in Bush v. Gore. As of 2024, this marked the last election in which the Republican nominee won Colorado, New Mexico, and Virginia; it was also the last election in which the Republican nominee won Nevada until 2024.

At the time, Bush received the most popular votes in history, a record that would be broken in 2008. Bush's win was the only Republican popular-vote victory during the eight elections from 1992 to 2020. Bush is the only incumbent Republican president to have won a second term since Ronald Reagan in 1984, (Note: In 2024, Republican Donald Trump won a second non-consecutive term, after losing his re-election campaign in 2020.) and the only Republican presidential candidate to have won a majority of the popular vote since his father in 1988. (Note: In 2024, Republican Donald Trump won a plurality of the popular vote, but was 0.2% short of a majority.)

== Background ==
George W. Bush won the presidency in 2000 after the U.S. Supreme Court's decision in Bush v. Gore remanded the case to the Florida Supreme Court, which declared there was not sufficient time to hold a recount without violating the U.S. Constitution. Just eight months into Bush's presidency, the terrorist attacks of September 11, 2001, suddenly transformed him into a wartime president. His approval ratings surged to near 90%. Within a month, the forces of a coalition led by the United States entered Afghanistan, which had been sheltering Osama bin Laden, suspected mastermind of the September 11 attacks. The Taliban had been removed by December, although a long reconstruction would follow.

The Bush administration then turned its attention to Iraq and argued the need to remove Saddam Hussein from power in Iraq had become urgent. Among the stated reasons were that Saddam's regime had tried to acquire nuclear material and had not properly accounted for biological and chemical material it was known to have previously possessed. Both the possession of these weapons of mass destruction (WMD), and the failure to account for them, would violate the UN sanctions. The assertion about WMD was hotly advanced by the Bush administration from the beginning, but other major powers including China, France, Germany, and Russia remained unconvinced that Iraq was a threat and refused to allow passage of a UN Security Council resolution to authorize the use of force. Iraq permitted UN weapon inspectors in November 2002, who were continuing their work to assess the WMD claim when the Bush administration decided to proceed with war without UN authorization and told the inspectors to leave the country. The United States invaded Iraq on March 20, 2003, along with a "coalition of the willing" that consisted of additional troops from the United Kingdom, and to a lesser extent, from Australia and Poland. Within about three weeks, the invasion caused the collapse of both the Iraqi government and its armed forces; however, the U.S. and allied forces failed to find any weapon of mass destruction in Iraq. Nevertheless, on May 1, Bush landed on the aircraft carrier USS Abraham Lincoln, in a Lockheed S-3 Viking, where he gave a speech announcing the end of "major combat operations" in the Iraq War.

Both candidates were not only graduates of Yale University, but both were also members of the exclusive Skull and Bones society. It is the only time two "Bonesmen" have faced each other for the presidency.

== Nominations ==
=== Republican Party ===
Republican Party (United States) 2004 Republican Party ticket
George W. Bush	Dick Cheney
for President	for Vice President
43rd President of the United States (2001–2009)	46th Vice President of the United States (2001–2009)
Campaign

==== Republican primaries ====
Bush was able to ward off any serious challenge to the Republican nomination. Senator Lincoln Chafee from Rhode Island considered challenging Bush on an anti-war platform in New Hampshire but decided not to run after the capture of Saddam Hussein in December 2003. On March 10, 2004, Bush officially attained the number of delegates needed to be nominated at the 2004 Republican National Convention in New York City. He accepted the nomination on September 2, 2004, and retained Vice President Dick Cheney as his running mate. During the convention and throughout the campaign, Bush focused on two themes: defending America against terrorism and building an ownership society. The ownership society included allowing people to invest some of their Social Security in the stock market, increasing home and stock ownership, and encouraging more people to buy their own health insurance.

=== Democratic Party ===
Democratic Party (United States) 2004 Democratic Party ticket
John Kerry	John Edwards
for President	for Vice President
U.S. Senator from Massachusetts (1985–2013)	U.S. Senator from North Carolina (1999–2005)
Campaign

==== Withdrawn candidates ====
Candidates in this section are sorted by popular vote from the primaries
John Edwards	Howard Dean	Dennis Kucinich	Wesley Clark	Al Sharpton	Joe Lieberman	Carol Moseley Braun	Dick Gephardt
U.S. Senator from North Carolina (1999–2005)	79th Governor of Vermont (1991–2003)	U.S. Representative from Ohio (1997–2013)	Supreme Allied; Commander Europe (1997–2000)	Minister and Activist	U.S. Senator from Connecticut (1989–2013)	U.S. Senator from Illinois (1993–1999)	House Minority Leader (1995–2003)
Campaign	Campaign	Campaign	Campaign	Campaign	Campaign	Campaign	Campaign
W: March 2; 3,162,337 votes	W: Feb 18; 903,460 votes	W: July 22; 620,242 votes	W: Feb 11; 547,369 votes	W: March 15; 380,865 votes	W: Feb 3; 280,940 votes	W: Jan 15; 98,469 votes	W: Jan 20; 63,902 votes

==== Democratic primaries ====
The 2004 Democratic Party presidential primaries took place from January 14 to June 8, 2004, to select the Democratic Party's nominee for president. Before the primaries, Vermont governor Howard Dean was a favorite to win the nomination; however, Massachusetts senator John Kerry won victories in two early races: the Iowa caucuses and the New Hampshire primary. These wins strengthened Kerry's previously weak campaign. By March 11, Kerry had received enough delegates to win the nomination. Other major candidates included North Carolina senator John Edwards and retired U.S. Army general Wesley Clark. Kerry asked Republican senator John McCain to be his running mate but McCain turned down his offer. On July 6, Kerry selected Edwards as his running mate, shortly before the 2004 Democratic National Convention was held later that month in Boston.

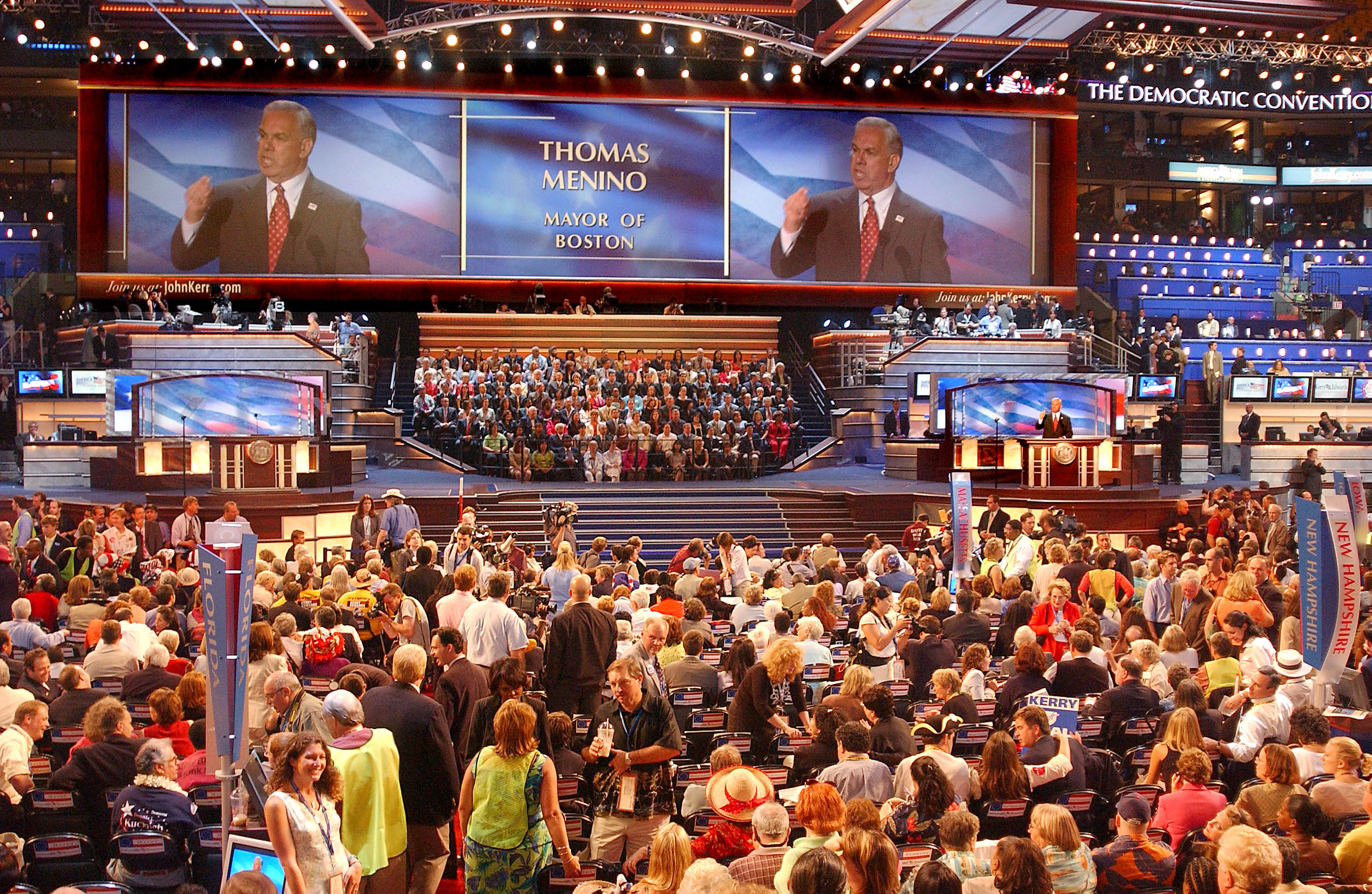
Boston mayor Thomas Menino, welcomes delegates to the 2004 Democratic National Convention.

==== Democratic National Convention ====
Heading into the convention, the Kerry–Edwards ticket unveiled its new slogan: a promise to make America "stronger at home and more respected in the world". Kerry made his Vietnam War experience the convention's prominent theme. The keynote address at the convention was delivered by Illinois state senator and U.S. Senate candidate and future president Barack Obama; the speech was well received, and it elevated Obama's status within the Democratic Party.

=== Third-party and independent candidates ===
There were four other presidential tickets on the ballot in a number of states totaling enough electoral votes to have a theoretical possibility of winning a majority in the Electoral College.

==== Ralph Nader candidacy ====
2004 Independent ticket
Ralph Nader	Peter Camejo
for President	for Vice President
Founder of Public Citizen	Activist from California

After his run in 2000, Ralph Nader once again ran for president in 2004 as an independent rather than the Green Party. He received endorsements from Reform Party, Independent Party (DE), Populist Party (MD), Better Life Party, Cross-endorsements N.Y., Peace and Justice Party, Independence Parties of New York and South Carolina, and the Vermont Green Party (who chose not to ratify the national party's presidential nominee). He chose Peter Comejo. In Alabama and New York, a ballot line appeared in which running mate Peter Camejo was replaced with Jan D. Pierce, Vice President of the Communications Workers of America and in 2000 was head of "Labor for Nader." Pierce had also been filed as his running mate in Ohio, where they failed to get on the ballot. In Montana Camejo was replaced with Karen Sanchirico, an Ada County, Idaho Green Party activist and founder of the Idaho Patriots.

==== Libertarian Party ====
2004 Libertarian Party ticket
Michael Badnarik	Richard Campagna
for President	for Vice President
Computer Consultant from Texas	Community College teacher from Iowa

Michael Badnarik / Richard Campagna, Libertarian Party (campaign). Badnarik was nominated on the third ballot and Campagna on the first ballot at the Libertarian National Convention in Atlanta, Georgia, held May 28–31, 2004.

==== Green Party ====
2004 Green Party ticket
David Cobb	Pat LaMarche
for President	for Vice President
Activist from California	Activist from Maine

David Cobb / Pat LaMarche, Green Party (campaign). Cobb was nominated on the second ballot at the 2004 Green National Convention in Milwaukee, Wisconsin, held June 23–28, 2004.

==== Constitution Party ====
Michael Peroutka / Chuck Baldwin, Constitution Party (also Alaskan Independence Party). Peroutka and Baldwin were unanimously nominated at the Constitution Party National Convention at Valley Forge, Pennsylvania (June 23–26, 2004).

== Issues unique to the election ==
=== Electronic voting machines ===
Ahead of the 2004 election, some states implemented electronic voting systems. Critics raised several issues about voting machines, particularly those made by Diebold Election Systems. Cybersecurity professionals found security vulnerabilities in Diebold machines. Voting machines made by several companies were also criticized for their lack of a paper trail, which would have made results easier to verify. Democrats also criticized various executives at Diebold, Inc. (the parent company of Diebold Election Systems) for their support of Bush's campaign, stating that it constituted a conflict of interest. Following these issues, California banned the use of Diebold's AccuVote TSX voting machines for elections in 2004.

=== Campaign law changes ===
The 2004 election was the first to be affected by the campaign finance reforms mandated by the Bipartisan Campaign Reform Act of 2002. The act created restrictions on fundraising by political parties and candidates. A large number of independent 527 groups were created to bypass these restrictions. Named for a section of the Internal Revenue Code, these groups were able to raise large amounts of money for various political causes as long as they did not coordinate their activities with political campaigns. Examples of 527s include Swift Boat Veterans for Truth, MoveOn.org, the Media Fund, and America Coming Together. These groups were active throughout the campaign season, spending a record $556 million for all elections in 2004.

The Stand by Your Ad provision of the Bipartisan Campaign Reform Act required political advertisements on television to include a verbal disclaimer identifying the organization or campaign responsible for the advertisement. This provision was intended to force campaigns to take responsibility for negative advertisements. Campaign strategists criticized this requirement, stating that it would waste time and cause voters to be confused.

== General election campaign ==
=== Campaign issues ===
Bush focused his campaign on national security, presenting himself as a decisive leader and contrasted Kerry as a "flip-flopper." This strategy was designed to convey to American voters the idea that Bush could be trusted to be tough on terrorism while Kerry would be "uncertain in the face of danger." In the final months before the election, Kerry's campaign focused on domestic issues such as the economy and health care. Kerry's campaign managers believed that Kerry had an advantage on domestic issues. Bush's campaign also focused on increasing voter turnout among conservatives. According to one exit poll, people who voted for Bush cited the issues of terrorism and traditional values as the most important factors in their decision. Kerry supporters cited the war in Iraq, the economy and jobs, and health care.

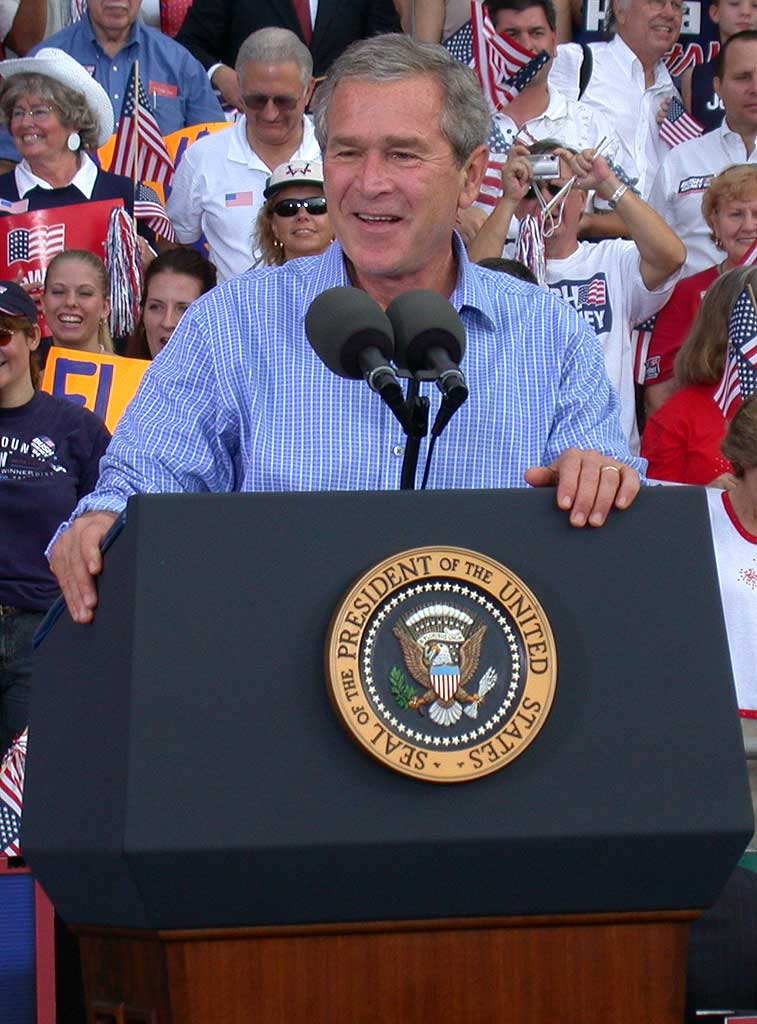
Bush speaking at campaign rally in St. Petersburg, Florida, October 19, 2004

==== Economy ====
Tax cuts were passed in 2001 and 2003 under the Bush administration with Bush's support. Kerry voted against these tax cuts. During the 2004 campaign, Bush praised these tax cuts, stating that they helped to grow the economy. On the other hand, Kerry attacked Bush for failing to create jobs under his presidency. Kerry stated that he wanted to reduce the United States budget deficit by capping government spending while ending various tax breaks for businesses. Kerry also supported tax credits for businesses that hire additional workers. Bush attacked Kerry for his economic proposals, stating that they would cause Americans to pay higher taxes. Bush also attacked Kerry for previously supporting tax raises, such as a proposed increase on the federal gas tax.

==== Foreign policy ====
Bush defended the Iraq War, arguing that it was necessary to stop terrorism. He also said that the United States had made progress stopping terrorism in other nations. Bush attacked Kerry for opposing the Iraq War after voting to authorize it in 2002, characterizing the shift as one of many flip-flops by Kerry. Kerry argued that Bush had misled the American public in pursuing the Iraq War, noting that no illegal weapons had been found in Iraq. He said that the Iraq War was a mistake and a diversion from terrorism in other nations such as Afghanistan. After the election, exit polls found that foreign policy concerns were the most important issues for voters.

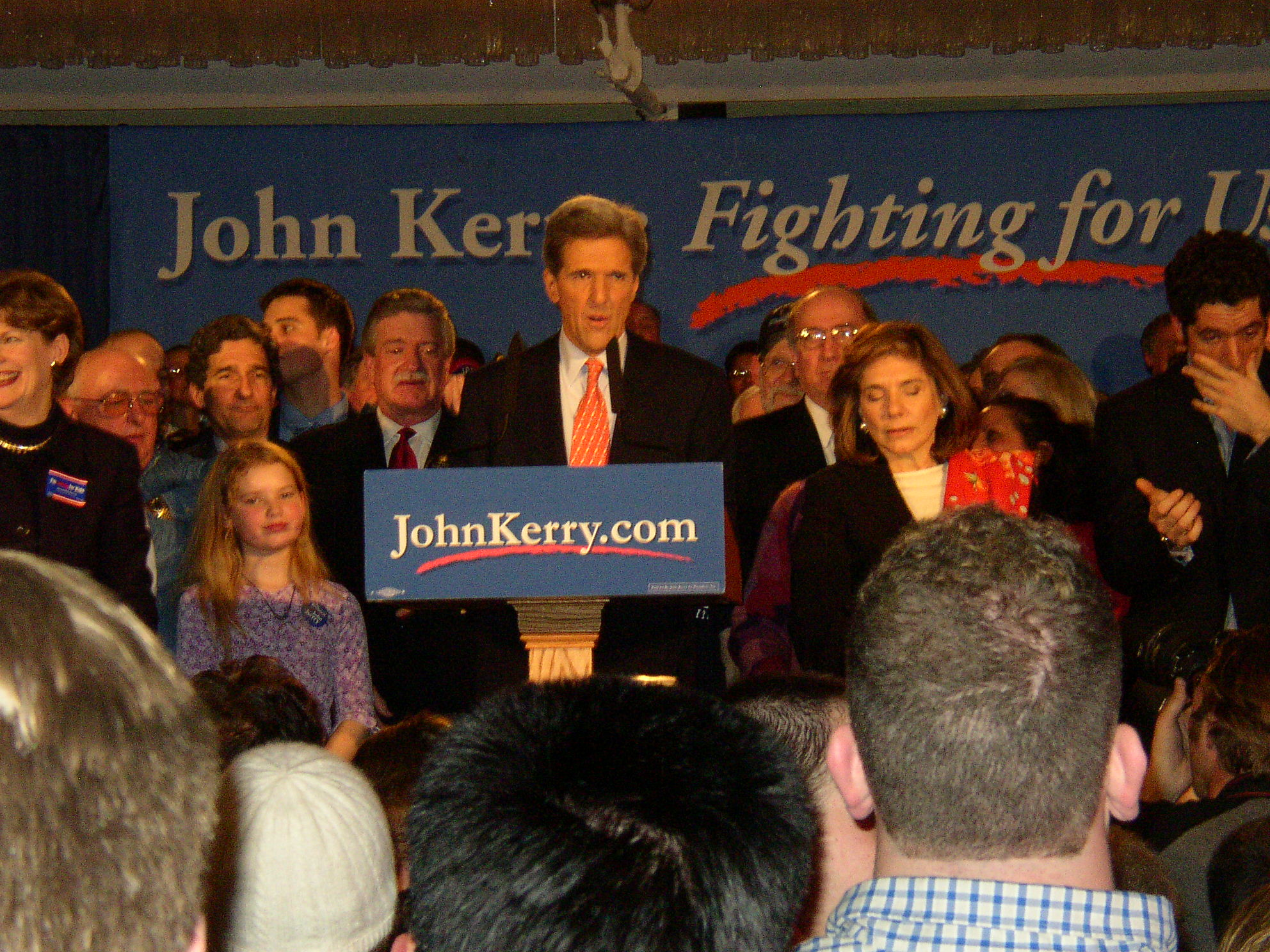
John Kerry at a Oakland Rally on January 27, 2004

==== Health care ====
Health savings accounts (HSAs) were introduced in 2004 as part of the Medicare Prescription Drug, Improvement, and Modernization Act, signed by Bush in December 2003. As part of his 2004 campaign, Bush supported the expansion of HSAs. He proposed tax cuts to help Americans purchase their own health insurance. He also proposed a plan that would allow small businesses to purchase health insurance in large groups. Kerry's health care proposals included government subsidies for businesses that provide health insurance and the expansion of government-run health care programs. Health policy experts stated that Bush's proposals would have a more limited impact than Kerry's proposals. Kerry also attacked Bush for his policy on stem cell research. In 2001, the Bush administration restricted embryonic stem cell research to existing stem cell lines. Kerry stated that this restriction was a barrier to conducting important research.

==== Same-sex marriage ====
In July 2004, Bush announced his support for a Constitutional amendment to ban same-sex marriage, shortly before the Senate voted on the amendment. Although Kerry stated that he opposed same-sex marriage, he also opposed the amendment, saying that the legality of same-sex marriage should be decided by individual states. The Senate vote failed on July 14.

=== Controversies ===
==== Bush military service controversy ====
During the campaign, Bush was accused of failing to fulfill his required service in the Texas Air National Guard. A scandal occurred at CBS News after they aired a segment on 60 Minutes Wednesday, introducing what became known as the Killian documents. These documents were allegedly written by Jerry B. Killian, Bush's squadron commander, and they contained various allegations about Bush's service. Serious doubts about the documents' authenticity quickly emerged, leading CBS to appoint a review panel that eventually resulted in the firing of the news producer and other significant staffing changes. The Killian documents were eventually concluded to be forgeries.

==== Kerry military service controversy ====
Kerry was accused by the Swift Vets and POWs for Truth of distorting his military service in Vietnam. The group challenged the legitimacy of each of the combat medals awarded to Kerry by the U.S. Navy, and the disposition of his discharge. The organization spent $22.4 million in advertisements against Kerry. After the election, political analysts described their advertising campaign as effective. The term swiftboating was used during the campaign to describe the organization's negative advertising, which Democrats saw as unfair. It was also used after the campaign to generally describe a harsh attack by a political opponent that is dishonest, personal and unfair.

=== Presidential debates ===
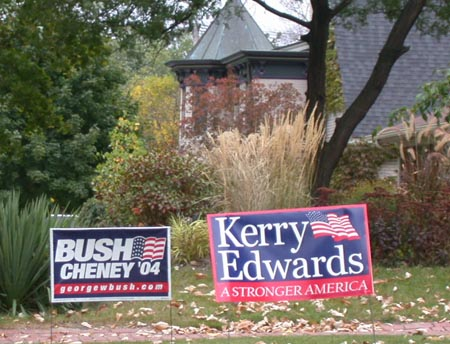
Neighboring yard signs for Bush and Kerry in Grosse Pointe, Michigan

Three presidential debates and one vice presidential debate were organized by the Commission on Presidential Debates, and held in the autumn of 2004.

Debates among candidates for the 2004 U.S. presidential election
No.	Date	Host	City	Moderators	Participants	Viewship (Millions)
P1	Thursday, September 30, 2004	University of Miami	Coral Gables, Florida	Jim Lehrer	President George W. Bush; Senator John Kerry	62.4
VP	Tuesday, October 5, 2004	Case Western Reserve University	Cleveland, Ohio	Gwen Ifill	Vice President Dick Cheney; Senator John Edwards	43.5
P2	Friday, October 8, 2004	Washington University in St. Louis	St. Louis, Missouri	Charles Gibson	President George W. Bush; Senator John Kerry	46.7
P3	Wednesday, October 13, 2004	Arizona State University	Tempe, Arizona	Bob Schieffer	President George W. Bush; Senator John Kerry	51.1

- Sites of the 2004 general election debates
  The first debate was held on September 30, slated to focus on foreign policy. A consensus formed among mainstream pollsters and pundits that Kerry won the debate decisively, strengthening what had come to be seen as a weak and troubled campaign.
- On October 5, the vice presidential debate between Cheney and Edwards. An initial poll by ABC indicated a victory for Cheney, while polls by CNN and MSNBC gave it to Edwards.
- The second presidential debate was conducted in a town meeting format, less formal than the first presidential debate. This debate saw Bush and Kerry taking questions on a variety of subjects from a local audience.
- Bush and Kerry met for the third and final debate on October 13. 51 million viewers watched the debate. After Kerry, responding to a question about gay rights, reminded the audience that Vice President Cheney's daughter was a lesbian, Cheney responded with a statement calling himself "a pretty angry father" due to Kerry using Cheney's daughter's sexual orientation for his political purposes. Polls taken by Gallup in found that Kerry pulled ahead in October, but showed a tight race as the election drew to a close.

=== Osama bin Laden videotape ===
On October 29, four days before the election, excerpts of a video of Osama bin Laden addressing the American people were broadcast on al Jazeera. In his remarks, bin Laden mentions the September 11 attacks, and taunted Bush over his response to them. In the days following the video's release, Bush's lead over Kerry increased by several points.

=== Electoral College forecasts ===
Elections analysts and political pundits issue probabilistic forecasts of the composition of the Electoral College. These forecasts use a variety of factors to estimate the likelihood of each candidate winning the Electoral College electors for that state. Most election predictors use the following ratings:

- "tossup": no advantage
- "tilt" (used by some predictors): advantage that is not quite as strong as "lean"
- "lean" or "leans": slight advantage
- "likely": significant, but surmountable, advantage
- "safe" or "solid": near-certain chance of victory

Below is a list of states considered by one or more forecasts to be competitive; states that are not deemed to be "safe" or "solid" by at least one of the forecasters The Cook Political Report, The New York Times, and CNN.

State	EVs	New York Times November 2, 2004	538 November 2, 2004	CNN November 2, 2004
Arkansas	6	Likely R	Likely R	Lean R
Arizona	10	Likely R	Likely R	Lean R
Colorado	9	Likely R	Lean R	Lean R
Delaware	3	Likely D	Likely D	Lean D
Florida	27	Likely R	Tossup	Tossup
Iowa	7	Likely R (flip)	Tossup	Lean R (flip)
Maryland	10	Likely D	Likely D	Safe D
Maine	4	Likely D	Lean D	Lean D
Michigan	17	Likely D	Lean D	Lean D
Minnesota	10	Likely D	Tossup	Tossup
New Hampshire	4	Likely D (flip)	Tossup	Tossup
Missouri	11	Likely R	Lean R	Lean R
Nevada	5	Likely R	Tossup	Lean R
New Jersey	15	Likely D	Likely D	Lean D
New Mexico	5	Lean R (flip)	Tossup	Tossup
North Carolina	15	Likely R	Lean R	Safe R
Ohio	20	Lean D (flip)	Tossup	Tossup
Pennsylvania	21	Likely D	Tossup	Lean D
Oregon	7	Likely D	Lean D	Lean D
Tennessee	11	Likely R	Lean R	Safe R
Wisconsin	10	Likely R (flip)	Tossup	Tossup
West Virginia	5	Likely R	Lean R	Likely R
Virginia	13	Likely R	Lean R	Lean R

== Results ==
Electoral results
Presidential candidate	Party	Home state	Popular vote		Electoral vote	Running mate		
Presidential candidate	Party	Home state	Count	Percentage	Electoral vote	Vice-presidential candidate	Home state	Electoral vote
George W. Bush (incumbent)	Republican	Texas	62,040,610	50.73%	286	Dick Cheney (incumbent)	Wyoming	286
John Kerry	Democratic	Massachusetts	59,028,444	48.27%	251	John Edwards	North Carolina	251
John Edwards^{(a)}	Democratic	North Carolina	0	0.00%	1	John Edwards	North Carolina	1
Ralph Nader	Reform	Connecticut	465,650	0.38%	0	Peter Camejo^{(b)}	California	0
Michael Badnarik	Libertarian	Texas	397,265	0.32%	0	Richard Campagna	Iowa	0
Michael Peroutka	Constitution	Maryland	143,630	0.12%	0	Chuck Baldwin	Florida	0
David Cobb	Green	Texas	119,859	0.10%	0	Pat LaMarche	Maine	0
Leonard Peltier	Peace and Freedom	Pennsylvania	27,607	0.02%	0	Janice Jordan	California	0
Walt Brown	Socialist	Oregon	10,837	0.01%	0	Mary Alice Herbert	Vermont	0
Róger Calero^{(c)}	Socialist Workers	New York	3,689	0.01%	0	Arrin Hawkins^{(c)}	Minnesota	0
Thomas Harens	Christian Freedom	Minnesota	2,387	0.002%	0	Jennifer Ryan	Minnesota	0
Other			50,652	0.04%	—	Other		—
Total			122,290,630	100%	538			538
Needed to win					270			270

Source (Electoral and Popular Vote): Federal Elections Commission Electoral and Popular Vote Summary Voting age population: 215,664,000

Percent of voting age population casting a vote for president: 56.70%

^{(a)} One faithless elector from Minnesota cast an electoral vote for John Edwards (written as John Ewards) for president.
^{(b)} In Montana, Karen Sanchirico was listed on the ballot as Nader's running mate, not Camejo. In Alabama, Jan D. Pierce was Nader's running mate. In New York, Nader appeared on two distinct tickets, one with Camejo and one with Pierce.
^{(c)} Because Arrin Hawkins, then aged 28, was constitutionally ineligible to serve as vice president, Margaret Trowe replaced her on the ballot in some states. James Harris replaced Calero on certain other states' ballots.

Popular vote
Bush	50.73%
Kerry	48.27%
Nader	0.38%
Badnarik	0.32%
Peroutka	0.12%
Others	0.17%

Electoral vote
Bush	53.16%
Kerry	46.65%
Edwards	0.19%

=== Results by state ===
Of the 3,154 counties/districts/independent cities making returns, Bush won the popular vote in 2,568 (81.42%) while Kerry carried 586 (18.58%). The following table records the official vote tallies for each state as reported by the official Federal Election Commission report. The column labeled "Margin" shows Bush's margin of victory over Kerry (the margin is negative for states and districts won by Kerry).

Legend
States/districts won by Kerry/Edwards
States/districts won by Bush/Cheney
†	At-large results (for states that split electoral votes)

		George W. Bush Republican			John Kerry Democratic			Ralph Nader Independent / Reform			Michael Badnarik Libertarian			Michael Peroutka Constitution			David Cobb Green			Others			Margin		Margin Swing (Note: Percentage point difference in margin from the 2000 election)	State Total	
State	EV	#	%	EV	#	%	EV	#	%	EV	#	%	EV	#	%	EV	#	%	EV	#	%	EV	#	%	%	#	
Alabama	9	1,176,394	62.46%	9	693,933	36.84%	–	6,701	0.36%	–	3,529	0.19%	–	1,994	0.11%	–	0	0.00%	–	898	0.05%	–	482,461	25.62%	10.70%	1,883,449	AL
Alaska	3	190,889	61.07%	3	111,025	35.52%	–	5,069	1.62%	–	1,675	0.54%	–	2,092	0.67%	–	1,058	0.34%	–	790	0.25%	–	79,864	25.55%	−5.40%	312,598	AK
Arizona	10	1,104,294	54.87%	10	893,524	44.40%	–	2,773	0.14%	–	11,856	0.59%	–	0	0.00%	–	138	0.01%	–	0	0.00%	–	210,770	10.47%	4.18%	2,012,585	AZ
Arkansas	6	572,898	54.31%	6	469,953	44.55%	–	6,171	0.58%	–	2,352	0.22%	–	2,083	0.20%	–	1,488	0.14%	–	0	0.00%	–	102,945	9.76%	4.32%	1,054,945	AR
California	55	5,509,826	44.36%	–	6,745,485	54.30%	55	21,213	0.17%	–	50,165	0.40%	–	26,645	0.21%	–	40,771	0.33%	–	27,747	0.22%	–	−1,235,659	−9.94%	1.85%	12,421,852	CA
Colorado	9	1,101,255	51.69%	9	1,001,732	47.02%	–	12,718	0.60%	–	7,664	0.36%	–	2,562	0.12%	–	1,591	0.07%	–	2,808	0.13%	–	99,523	4.67%	−3.69%	2,130,330	CO
Connecticut	7	693,826	43.95%	–	857,488	54.31%	7	12,969	0.82%	–	3,367	0.21%	–	1,543	0.10%	–	9,564	0.61%	–	12	0.00%	–	−163,662	−10.36%	7.10%	1,578,769	CT
Delaware	3	171,660	45.75%	–	200,152	53.35%	3	2,153	0.57%	–	586	0.16%	–	289	0.08%	–	250	0.07%	–	100	0.03%	–	−28,492	−7.60%	5.47%	375,190	DE
District of Columbia	3	21,256	9.34%	–	202,970	89.18%	3	1,485	0.65%	–	502	0.22%	–	0	0.00%	–	737	0.32%	–	636	0.28%	–	−181,714	−79.84%	−3.64%	227,586	DC
Florida	27	3,964,522	52.10%	27	3,583,544	47.09%	–	32,971	0.43%	–	11,996	0.16%	–	6,626	0.09%	–	3,917	0.05%	–	6,234	0.08%	–	380,978	5.01%	5.00%	7,609,810	FL
Georgia	15	1,914,254	57.97%	15	1,366,149	41.37%	–	2,231	0.07%	–	18,387	0.56%	–	580	0.02%	–	228	0.01%	–	46	0.00%	–	548,105	16.60%	4.91%	3,301,875	GA
Hawaii	4	194,191	45.26%	–	231,708	54.01%	4	0	0.00%	–	1,377	0.32%	–	0	0.00%	–	1,737	0.40%	–	0	0.00%	–	−37,517	−8.75%	9.59%	429,013	HI
Idaho	4	409,235	68.38%	4	181,098	30.26%	–	1,115	0.19%	–	3,844	0.64%	–	3,084	0.52%	–	58	0.01%	–	13	0.00%	–	228,137	38.12%	−1.41%	598,447	ID
Illinois	21	2,345,946	44.48%	–	2,891,550	54.82%	21	3,571	0.07%	–	32,442	0.62%	–	440	0.01%	–	241	0.00%	–	132	0.00%	–	−545,604	−10.34%	1.67%	5,274,322	IL
Indiana	11	1,479,438	59.94%	11	969,011	39.26%	–	1,328	0.05%	–	18,058	0.73%	–	0	0.00%	–	102	0.00%	–	65	0.00%	–	510,427	20.68%	5.05%	2,468,002	IN
Iowa	7	751,957	49.90%	7	741,898	49.23%	–	5,973	0.40%	–	2,992	0.20%	–	1,304	0.09%	–	1,141	0.08%	–	1,643	0.11%	–	10,059	0.67%	0.98%	1,506,908	IA
Kansas	6	736,456	62.00%	6	434,993	36.62%	–	9,348	0.79%	–	4,013	0.34%	–	2,899	0.24%	–	33	0.00%	–	14	0.00%	–	301,463	25.38%	4.58%	1,187,756	KS
Kentucky	8	1,069,439	59.55%	8	712,733	39.69%	–	8,856	0.49%	–	2,619	0.15%	–	2,213	0.12%	–	0	0.00%	–	22	0.00%	–	356,706	19.86%	4.73%	1,795,882	KY
Louisiana	9	1,102,169	56.72%	9	820,299	42.22%	–	7,032	0.36%	–	2,781	0.14%	–	5,203	0.27%	–	1,276	0.07%	–	4,346	0.22%	–	281,870	14.50%	6.83%	1,943,106	LA
Maine^{†}	2	330,201	44.58%	–	396,842	53.57%	2	8,069	1.09%	–	1,965	0.27%	–	735	0.10%	–	2,936	0.40%	–	4	0.00%	–	−66,641	−8.99%	−3.89%	740,752	ME
Maine-1	1	165,824	43.14%	–	211,703	55.07%	1	4,004	1.04%	–	1,047	0.27%	–	346	0.09%	–	1,468	0.38%	–	–	–	–	−45,879	−11.93%	−4.01%	384,392	ME1
Maine-2	1	164,377	46.13%	–	185,139	51.95%	1	4,065	1.14%	–	918	0.26%	–	389	0.11%	–	1,468	0.41%	–	–	–	–	−20,762	−5.83%	−3.96%	356,356	ME2
Maryland	10	1,024,703	42.93%	–	1,334,493	55.91%	10	11,854	0.50%	–	6,094	0.26%	–	3,421	0.14%	–	3,632	0.15%	–	2,481	0.10%	–	−309,790	−12.98%	3.41%	2,386,678	MD
Massachusetts	12	1,071,109	36.78%	–	1,803,800	61.94%	12	4,806	0.17%	–	15,022	0.52%	–	0	0.00%	–	10,623	0.36%	–	7,028	0.24%	–	−732,691	−25.16%	2.14%	2,912,388	MA
Michigan	17	2,313,746	47.81%	–	2,479,183	51.23%	17	24,035	0.50%	–	10,552	0.22%	–	4,980	0.10%	–	5,325	0.11%	–	1,431	0.03%	–	−165,437	−3.42%	1.71%	4,839,252	MI
Minnesota	10	1,346,695	47.61%	–	1,445,014	51.09%	9	18,683	0.66%	–	4,639	0.16%	–	3,074	0.11%	–	4,408	0.16%	–	5,874	0.21%	–	−98,319	−3.48%	−1.08%	2,828,387	MN
Mississippi	6	684,981	59.45%	6	458,094	39.76%	–	3,177	0.28%	–	1,793	0.16%	–	1,759	0.15%	–	1,073	0.09%	–	1,268	0.11%	–	226,887	19.69%	2.77%	1,152,145	MS
Missouri	11	1,455,713	53.30%	11	1,259,171	46.10%	–	1,294	0.05%	–	9,831	0.36%	–	5,355	0.20%	–	0	0.00%	–	0	0.00%	–	196,542	7.20%	3.86%	2,731,364	MO
Montana	3	266,063	59.07%	3	173,710	38.56%	–	6,168	1.37%	–	1,733	0.38%	–	1,764	0.39%	–	996	0.22%	–	11	0.00%	–	92,353	20.51%	−4.57%	450,445	MT
Nebraska^{†}	2	512,814	65.90%	2	254,328	32.68%	–	5,698	0.73%	–	2,041	0.26%	–	1,314	0.17%	–	978	0.13%	–	1,013	0.13%	–	258,486	33.22%	4.23%	778,186	NE
Nebraska-1	1	169,888	62.97%	1	96,314	35.70%	–	2,025	0.75%	–	656	0.24%	–	405	0.15%	–	453	0.17%	–	30	0.01%	–	73,574	27.27%	4.29%	269,771	NE1
Nebraska-2	1	153,041	60.24%	1	97,858	38.52%	–	1,731	0.68%	–	813	0.32%	–	305	0.12%	–	261	0.10%	–	23	0.01%	–	55,183	21.72%	3.32%	254,032	NE2
Nebraska-3	1	189,885	74.92%	1	60,156	23.73%	–	1,942	0.77%	–	572	0.23%	–	604	0.24%	–	264	0.10%	–	29	0.01%	–	129,729	51.19%	4.77%	253,452	NE3
Nevada	5	418,690	50.47%	5	397,190	47.88%	–	4,838	0.58%	–	3,176	0.38%	–	1,152	0.14%	–	853	0.10%	–	3,688	0.44%	–	21,500	2.59%	−0.96%	829,587	NV
New Hampshire	4	331,237	48.87%	–	340,511	50.24%	4	4,479	0.66%	–	372	0.05%	–	161	0.02%	–	0	0.00%	–	978	0.14%	–	−9,274	−1.37%	−2.64%	677,738	NH
New Jersey	15	1,670,003	46.24%	–	1,911,430	52.92%	15	19,418	0.54%	–	4,514	0.12%	–	2,750	0.08%	–	1,807	0.05%	–	1,769	0.05%	–	−241,427	−6.68%	9.15%	3,611,691	NJ
New Mexico	5	376,930	49.84%	5	370,942	49.05%	–	4,053	0.54%	–	2,382	0.31%	–	771	0.10%	–	1,226	0.16%	–	0	0.00%	–	5,988	0.79%	0.85%	756,304	NM
New York	31	2,962,567	40.08%	–	4,314,280	58.37%	31	99,873	1.35%	–	11,607	0.16%	–	207	0.00%	–	87	0.00%	–	2,415	0.03%	–	−1,351,713	−18.29%	6.69%	7,391,036	NY
North Carolina	15	1,961,166	56.02%	15	1,525,849	43.58%	–	1,805	0.05%	–	11,731	0.34%	–	0	0.00%	–	108	0.00%	–	348	0.01%	–	435,317	12.44%	−0.40%	3,501,007	NC
North Dakota	3	196,651	62.86%	3	111,052	35.50%	–	3,756	1.20%	–	851	0.27%	–	514	0.16%	–	0	0.00%	–	9	0.00%	–	85,599	27.36%	−0.24%	312,833	ND
Ohio	20	2,859,768	50.81%	20	2,741,167	48.71%	–	0	0.00%	–	14,676	0.26%	–	11,939	0.21%	–	192	0.00%	–	166	0.00%	–	118,601	2.10%	−1.40%	5,627,908	OH
Oklahoma	7	959,792	65.57%	7	503,966	34.43%	–	0	0.00%	–	0	0.00%	–	0	0.00%	–	0	0.00%	–	0	0.00%	–	455,826	31.14%	9.26%	1,463,758	OK
Oregon	7	866,831	47.19%	–	943,163	51.35%	7	0	0.00%	–	7,260	0.40%	–	5,257	0.29%	–	5,315	0.29%	–	8,956	0.49%	–	−76,332	−4.16%	−3.72%	1,836,782	OR
Pennsylvania	21	2,793,847	48.42%	–	2,938,095	50.92%	21	2,656	0.05%	–	21,185	0.37%	–	6,318	0.11%	–	6,319	0.11%	–	1,170	0.02%	–	−144,248	−2.50%	1.67%	5,769,590	PA
Rhode Island	4	169,046	38.67%	–	259,765	59.42%	4	4,651	1.06%	–	907	0.21%	–	339	0.08%	–	1,333	0.30%	–	1,093	0.25%	–	−90,719	−20.75%	8.33%	437,134	RI
South Carolina	8	937,974	57.98%	8	661,699	40.90%	–	5,520	0.34%	–	3,608	0.22%	–	5,317	0.33%	–	1,488	0.09%	–	2,124	0.13%	–	276,275	17.08%	1.14%	1,617,730	SC
South Dakota	3	232,584	59.91%	3	149,244	38.44%	–	4,320	1.11%	–	964	0.25%	–	1,103	0.28%	–	0	0.00%	–	0	0.00%	–	83,340	21.47%	−1.26%	388,215	SD
Tennessee	11	1,384,375	56.80%	11	1,036,477	42.53%	–	8,992	0.37%	–	4,866	0.20%	–	2,570	0.11%	–	33	0.00%	–	6	0.00%	–	347,898	14.27%	10.41%	2,437,319	TN
Texas	34	4,526,917	61.09%	34	2,832,704	38.22%	–	9,159	0.12%	–	38,787	0.52%	–	1,636	0.02%	–	1,014	0.01%	–	548	0.01%	–	1,694,213	22.87%	1.54%	7,410,765	TX
Utah	5	663,742	71.54%	5	241,199	26.00%	–	11,305	1.22%	–	3,375	0.36%	–	6,841	0.74%	–	39	0.00%	–	1,343	0.14%	–	422,543	45.54%	5.05%	927,844	UT
Vermont	3	121,180	38.80%	–	184,067	58.94%	3	4,494	1.44%	–	1,102	0.35%	–	0	0.00%	–	0	0.00%	–	1,466	0.47%	–	−62,887	−20.14%	−10.20%	312,309	VT
Virginia	13	1,716,959	53.68%	13	1,454,742	45.48%	–	2,393	0.07%	–	11,032	0.34%	–	10,161	0.32%	–	104	0.00%	–	2,976	0.09%	–	262,217	8.20%	0.16%	3,198,367	VA
Washington	11	1,304,894	45.64%	–	1,510,201	52.82%	11	23,283	0.81%	–	11,955	0.42%	–	3,922	0.14%	–	2,974	0.10%	–	1,855	0.06%	–	−205,307	−7.18%	−1.60%	2,859,084	WA
West Virginia	5	423,778	56.06%	5	326,541	43.20%	–	4,063	0.54%	–	1,405	0.19%	–	82	0.01%	–	5	0.00%	–	13	0.00%	–	97,237	12.86%	6.54%	755,887	WV
Wisconsin	10	1,478,120	49.32%	–	1,489,504	49.70%	10	16,390	0.55%	–	6,464	0.22%	–	0	0.00%	–	2,661	0.09%	–	3,868	0.13%	–	−11,384	−0.38%	−0.16%	2,997,007	WI
Wyoming	3	167,629	68.86%	3	70,776	29.07%	–	2,741	1.13%	–	1,171	0.48%	–	631	0.26%	–	0	0.00%	–	480	0.20%	–	96,853	39.79%	−0.27%	243,428	WY
U.S Total	538	62,040,610	50.73%	286	59,028,444	48.27%	251	465,151	0.38%	–	397,265	0.32%	–	143,630	0.12%	–	119,859	0.10%	–	99,887	0.08%	–	3,012,166	2.46%	2.98%	122,290,630	US

Although Guam has no votes in the Electoral College, it has held a straw poll for its presidential preference since 1980. In 2004, the results were Bush 21,490 (64.1%), Kerry 11,781 (35.1%), Nader 196 (0.58%) and Badnarik 67 (0.2%). Maine and Nebraska each allowed for their electoral votes to be split between candidates. In both states, two electoral votes were awarded to the winner of the statewide race and one electoral vote was awarded to the winner of each congressional district.

==== States that flipped Democratic to Republican ====
- New Mexico
- Iowa

==== States that flipped Republican to Democratic ====
- New Hampshire

=== Close states ===
Red font color denotes those won by Republican President George W. Bush; blue denotes states won by Democrat John Kerry.

States where margin of victory was under 1% (22 electoral votes):

1. Wisconsin 0.38% (11,384 votes)
2. Iowa 0.67% (10,059 votes)
3. New Mexico 0.79% (5,988 votes)

States where margin of victory was more than 1% but less than 5% (93 electoral votes):

1. New Hampshire 1.37% (9,274 votes)
2. Ohio 2.10% (118,601 votes) (tipping point state)
3. Pennsylvania 2.50% (144,248 votes)
4. Nevada 2.59% (21,500 votes)
5. Michigan 3.42% (165,437 votes)
6. Minnesota 3.48% (98,319 votes)
7. Oregon 4.16% (76,332 votes)
8. Colorado 4.67% (99,523 votes)

States where margin of victory was more than 5% but less than 10% (149 electoral votes):

1. Florida 5.01% (380,978 votes)
2. Maine's 2nd congressional district 5.83% (20,762 votes)
3. New Jersey 6.68% (241,427 votes)
4. Washington 7.18% (205,307 votes)
5. Missouri 7.20% (196,542 votes)
6. Delaware 7.60% (28,492 votes)
7. Virginia 8.20% (262,217 votes)
8. Hawaii 8.75% (37,517 votes)
9. Maine 8.99% (66,641 votes)
10. Arkansas 9.76% (102,945 votes)
11. California 9.94% (1,235,659 votes)

==== Statistics ====
Counties with highest percent of vote (Republican)

1. Ochiltree County, Texas 91.97%
2. Madison County, Idaho 91.89%
3. Glasscock County, Texas 91.56%
4. Roberts County, Texas 90.93%
5. Arthur County, Nebraska 90.23%

Counties and county-equivalents with highest percent of vote (Democratic)

1. Washington, D.C. 89.18%
2. Shannon County, South Dakota 84.62%
3. City and County of San Francisco, California 83.02%
4. Macon County, Alabama 82.92%
5. Bronx County, New York 82.80%

=== Finance ===
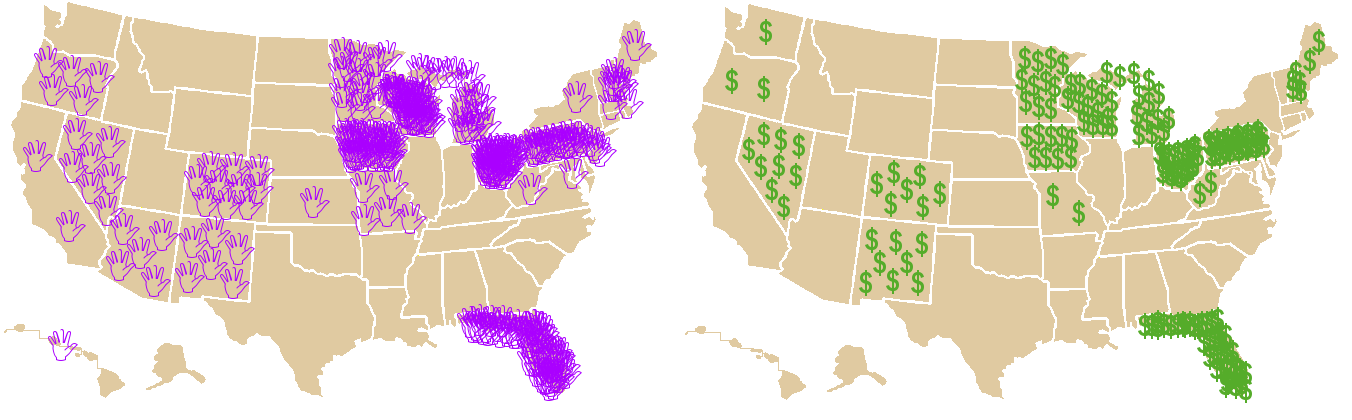
These maps show the amount of attention given by the campaigns to the close states. At left, each waving hand represents a visit from a presidential or vice-presidential candidate during the final five weeks. At right, each dollar sign represents one million dollars spent on TV advertising by the campaigns during the same time period.

Money spent

- George W. Bush (R) $367,227,801
- John Kerry (D) $326,236,288
- Ralph Nader (I) $4,566,037
- Michael Badnarik (L) $1,093,013
- Michael Peroutka (C) $729,087
- David Cobb (G) $493,723
- Walt Brown (SPUSA) $2,060

Source: FEC

=== Ballot access ===
Presidential ticket	Party	Ballot access
Bush / Cheney	Republican	50+DC
Kerry / Edwards	Democratic	50+DC
Badnarik / Campagna	Libertarian	48+DC
Peroutka / Baldwin	Constitution	36
Nader / Camejo	Independent, Reform	34+DC
Cobb / LaMarche	Green	27+DC

=== 2004 United States Electoral College ===
One elector in Minnesota cast a ballot for president with the name of "John Ewards" [sic] written on it. The Electoral College officials certified this ballot as a vote for Edwards for president. The remaining nine electors cast ballots for Kerry. All ten electors in the state cast ballots for Edwards for vice president (Edwards's name was spelled correctly on all ballots for vice president). This was the first time in U.S. history that an elector had cast a vote for the same person to be both president and vice president. Electoral balloting in Minnesota was performed by secret ballot, and none of the electors admitted to casting the Edwards vote for president, so it may never be known who the faithless elector was. It is not even known whether the vote for Edwards was deliberate or unintentional; the Republican Secretary of State and several of the Democratic electors have expressed the opinion that this was an accident.

=== Statistical analysis ===
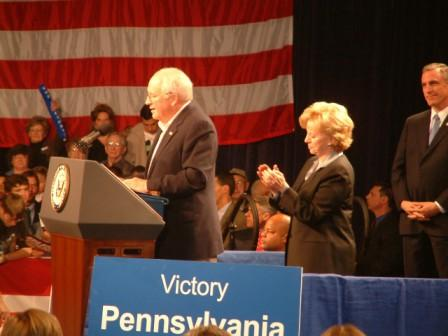
Cheney visited Washington & Jefferson College in Pennsylvania on October 27, 2004

During the campaign and as the results came in on the night of the election, there was much focus on Ohio, Pennsylvania, and Florida. These three swing states were seen as evenly divided, and with each casting 20 electoral votes or more, they had the power to decide the election. As the final results came in, Kerry took Pennsylvania and then Bush took Florida, focusing all attention on Ohio.

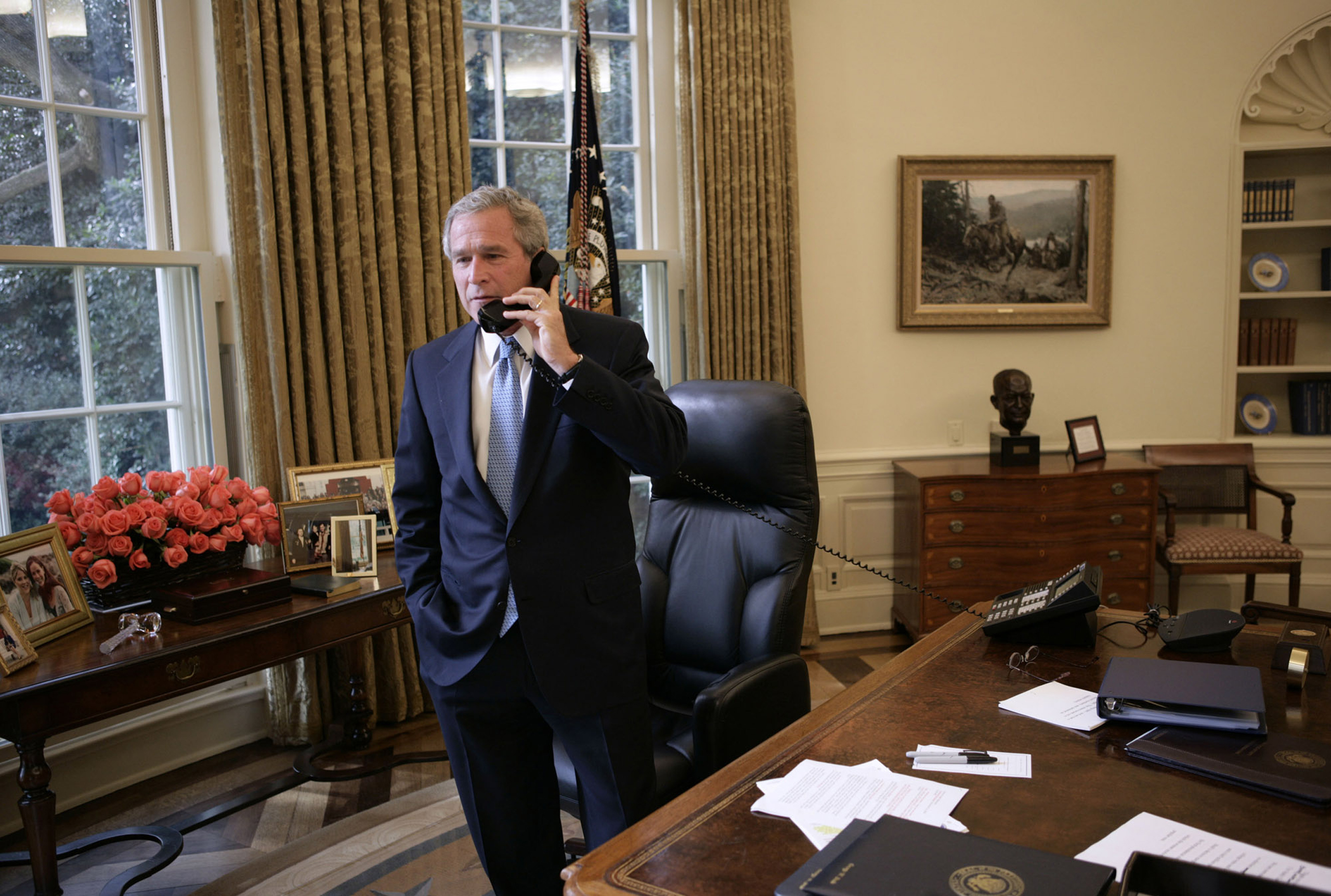
Bush in the Oval Office, receiving a concession phone call from Kerry, which came the afternoon of the day following the election

The morning after the election, the winner was still undetermined. The result in Ohio would decide the winner, although the results in New Mexico and Iowa were also undetermined. Bush led in Ohio, but the state was still counting provisional ballots. In the afternoon of the day after the election, Ohio Secretary of State Ken Blackwell announced that there were roughly 135,000 provisional ballots remaining. Kerry's campaign believed that it was statistically impossible to erase Bush's lead. Faced with this announcement, Kerry conceded defeat.

Bush became the first Republican to ever win without carrying New Hampshire, and the first to win the popular vote without Vermont and Illinois. This was the last time a president was re-elected to a consecutive term with a higher share of the electoral or popular vote. Bush carried Colorado despite the state being Kerry's birth state. Bush simultaneously lost his own birth state of Connecticut, making this the only election since 1864 where neither candidate carried their birth state. This election was the first time since 1976 that New Jersey, Connecticut, Vermont, Maine, Illinois, Michigan, and California voted for the losing candidate in the popular vote, the first time since 1980 that Maryland did so, and the first time since 1948 that Delaware did so. Bush's 2.4% popular vote margin is the smallest ever for a re-elected incumbent president, surpassing the 1812 election. (Note: In 2024, Donald Trump was elected to a nonconsecutive second term. Overall, Trump's 1.5% popular vote margin is the smallest ever for a re-elected president.)

Bush won three states that have not voted Republican since: Virginia, Colorado, and New Mexico. Virginia had voted Republican in every election from 1968 to 2004. Since 2008, Virginia has always voted Democratic and West Virginia has always voted Republican, regardless of the national outcome.

This is the last election in which the losing candidate won any of the following states: Michigan, Pennsylvania, and Wisconsin. This is also the last time a Republican was elected without carrying Maine's 2nd congressional district. This election is the only time in history that every Northeastern state voted Democratic and every former Confederate state voted Republican in the same election. Thus, Bush is the only candidate to win without carrying any Northeastern electoral votes. Furthermore, this was the last election where both major party tickets consisted entirely of white men. This is also the most recent election that the incumbent party would flip any states, with Bush becoming the first Republican since 1984 to win the state of Iowa, and since 1988 to win the state of New Mexico, both states he did not win in 2000. This was the last election where Nevada voted Republican until 2024; and Florida, Iowa, and Ohio until 2016.

This is the only presidential election since 1988 in which a Republican nominee won the national popular vote with a majority, and it remains the only presidential election since 1984 in which an incumbent Republican president won a second term. Bush became the only incumbent president to win consecutive re-election after previously losing the popular vote. Bush is the seventh Republican president to have won re-election to a consecutive term, along with Abraham Lincoln, Ulysses S. Grant, William McKinley, Dwight D. Eisenhower, Richard Nixon, and Ronald Reagan. Bush is also the most recent incumbent Republican president to have won a second term. (Note: In 2024, Republican Donald Trump won a second non-consecutive term, after losing his re-election campaign in 2020.) The 2004 election had the highest turnout rate among eligible voters since 1968. This election was one of only four U.S. presidential elections held since the Democrats and Republicans became the two major parties in which the winner did not carry any of the three Rust Belt states of Michigan, Pennsylvania, and Wisconsin; the others were 1884, 1916, and 2000, when Bush was first elected.

This was the first presidential election since 1988 where a candidate won a majority of the popular vote. Bush was the last Republican to win the popular vote until Donald Trump in 2024; Bush and Trump are also the only two presidents who won the Electoral College while losing the popular vote in one election who then went on to win both the Electoral College and the popular vote in a subsequent election. This remains the most recent presidential election in which both major party candidates flipped at least one state. In addition, this was one of only two elections in the 21st century in which a candidate from either party won fewer than 20 states, with the other being 2024, when Kamala Harris won 19 states, the same as John Kerry. This is the most recent instance in which both major party tickets did not include a woman or a person of color. This, along with the previous election would be the only ones between 1980 and 2024 where the winner won fewer than 300 electoral votes (or below 55% of the electoral college vote). This is also the last winning ticket that did not have Joe Biden or Donald Trump on it.

=== Maps ===
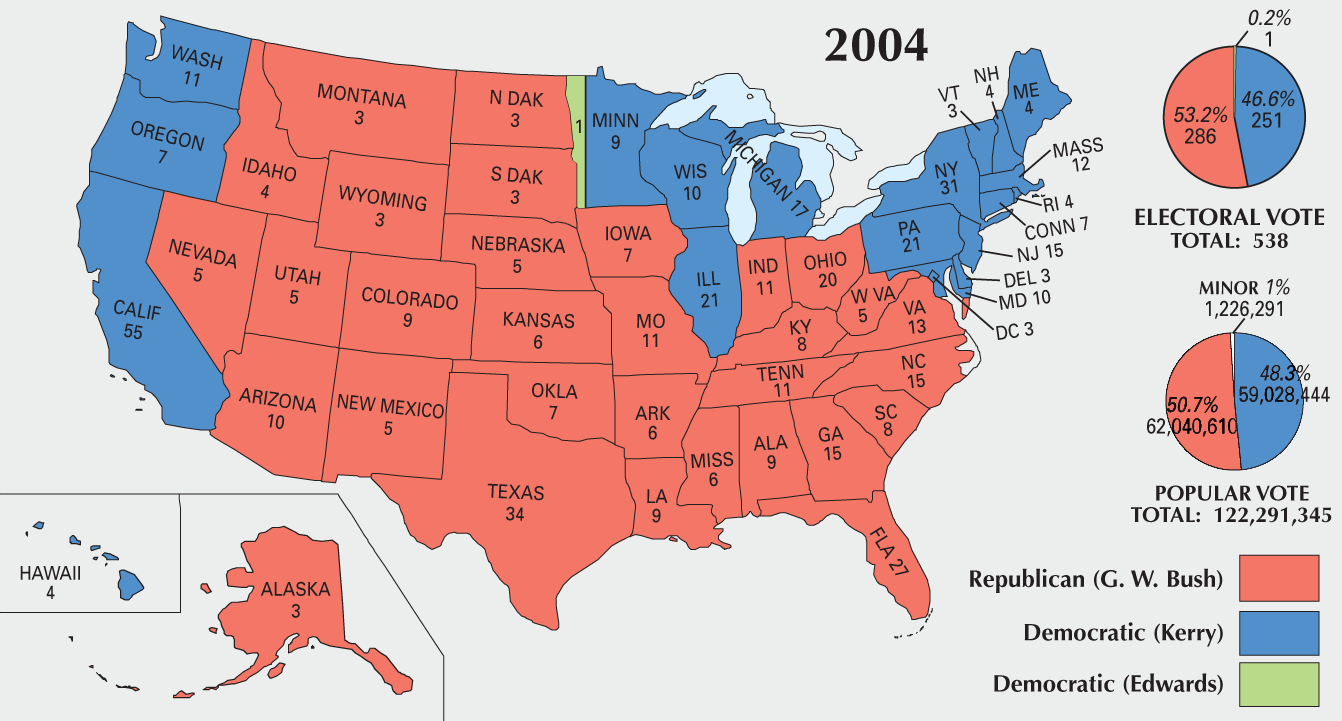
Results by state with pie charts for the electoral college and popular vote.

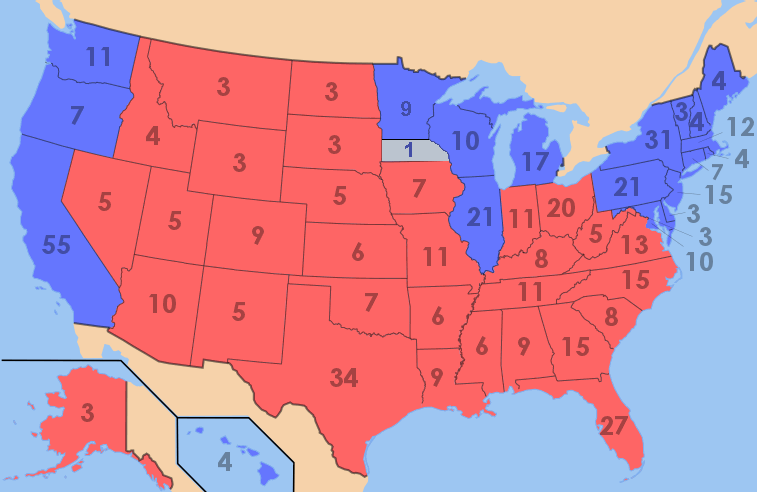
Presidential electoral votes by state. Red is Republican; blue is Democratic.

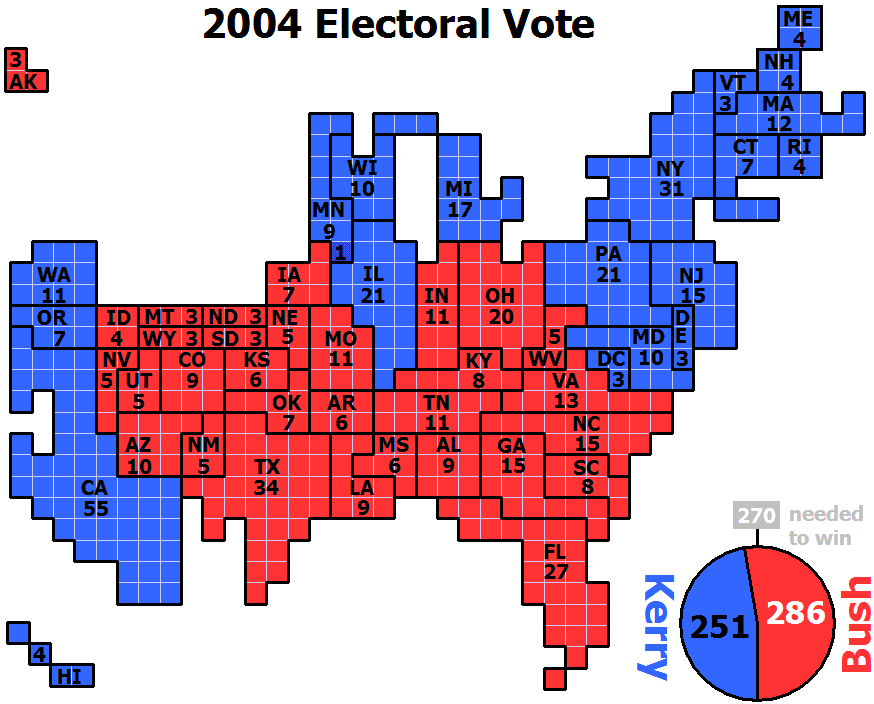
Cartogram in which each square represents one electoral vote.

Presidential popular votes by county. (Note: Alaska and Louisiana do not have counties. Alaska's boroughs and census areas and Louisiana's parishes are pictured.)

Results by county, shaded according to winning candidate's percentage of the vote.

Results by county flips from 2000 to the 2004 presidential election

County swing from 2000 to 2004

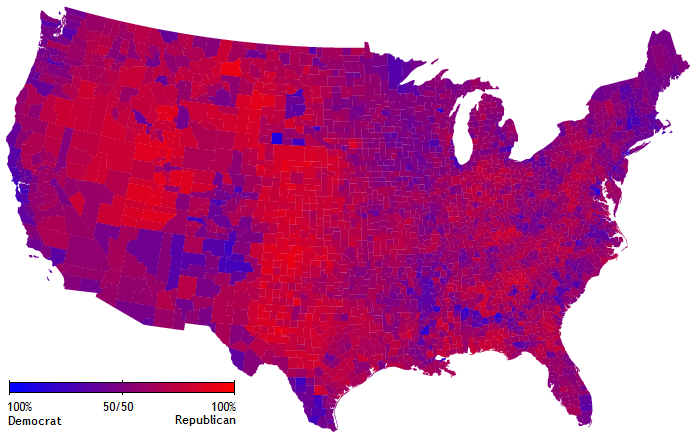
Presidential popular votes by county as a scale from red/Republican to blue/Democratic.

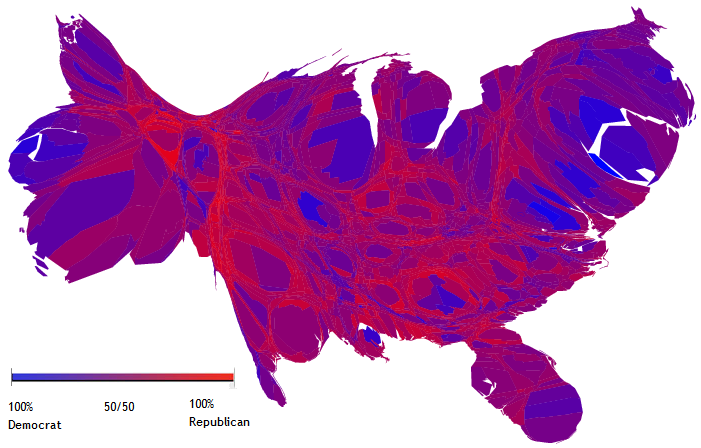
Presidential popular votes cartogram, in which the sizes of counties have been rescaled according to their population.

Results by congressional district.

Margin swing in each state between the 2000 and 2004 presidential elections

== Voter demographics ==
In 2004, voters with and without college degrees were roughly evenly split along partisan lines. By 2024, voters with college degrees were Democratic-leaning, while voters without college degrees were Republican-leaning.

2004 presidential vote by demographic subgroup
Demographic subgroup	Kerry	Bush	Other	% of total vote
Total vote	48	51	1	100
Ideology
Liberals	86	13	1	21
Moderates	54	45	1	45
Conservatives	15	84	1	34
Party
Democrats	89	11	0	37
Republicans	6	93	1	37
Independents	49	48	3	26
Gender
Men	44	55	1	46
Women	51	48	1	54
Marital status
Married	42	57	1	63
Non-married	58	40	2	37
Race
White	41	58	1	77
Black	88	11	1	11
Asian	56	43	1	2
Other	56	40	4	2
Hispanic	54	44	2	8
Religion
Protestant	40	59	1	54
Catholic	47	52	1	27
Jewish	74	25	1	3
Muslim	93	<1	>6	1
Other	74	23	3	7
None	67	31	2	10
Religious service attendance
More than weekly	35	64	1	16
Weekly	41	58	1	26
Monthly	49	50	1	14
A few times a year	54	45	1	28
Never	62	36	2	15
White evangelical or born-again Christian?
White evangelical or born-again Christian	21	78	1	23
Everyone else	56	43	1	77
Age
18–29 years old	54	45	1	17
30–44 years old	46	53	1	29
45–59 years old	48	51	1	30
60 and older	46	54	0	24
First time voter?
First time voter	53	46	1	11
Everyone else	48	51	1	89
Sexual orientation
Gay, lesbian, or bisexual	77	22	1	4
Heterosexual	46	53	1	96
Education
Not a high school graduate	50	49	1	4
High school graduate	47	52	1	22
Some college education	46	54	0	32
College graduate	46	52	2	26
Postgraduate education	55	44	1	16
Family income
Under $15,000	63	36	1	8
$15,000–30,000	57	42	1	15
$30,000–50,000	50	49	1	22
$50,000–75,000	43	56	1	23
$75,000–100,000	45	55	0	14
$100,000–150,000	42	57	1	11
$150,000–200,000	42	58	0	4
Over $200,000	35	63	2	3
Union households
Union	59	40	1	24
Non-union	44	55	1	76
Military service
Veterans	41	57	2	18
Non-veterans	50	49	1	82
Issue regarded as most important
Moral values	18	80	2	22
Economy	80	18	2	20
Terrorism	14	86	0	19
Iraq	73	26	1	15
Health care	77	23	0	8
Taxes	43	57	0	5
Education	73	26	1	4
Region
Northeast	56	43	1	22
Midwest	48	51	1	26
South	42	58	0	32
West	50	49	1	20
Community size
Urban	54	45	1	30
Suburban	47	52	1	46
Rural	42	57	1	25

Source: CNN exit poll (13,660 surveyed)

== Aftermath ==
=== Voting problems in Ohio ===
After the election, activists and election scholars criticized various issues with the election in Ohio. Long lines at polling places over seven hours were reported. An electronic voting machine erroneously gave thousands of extra votes to Bush. Professor Edward B. Foley stated that he believed that Ohio's voting problems did not affect the outcome.

=== Objections and conspiracy theories ===
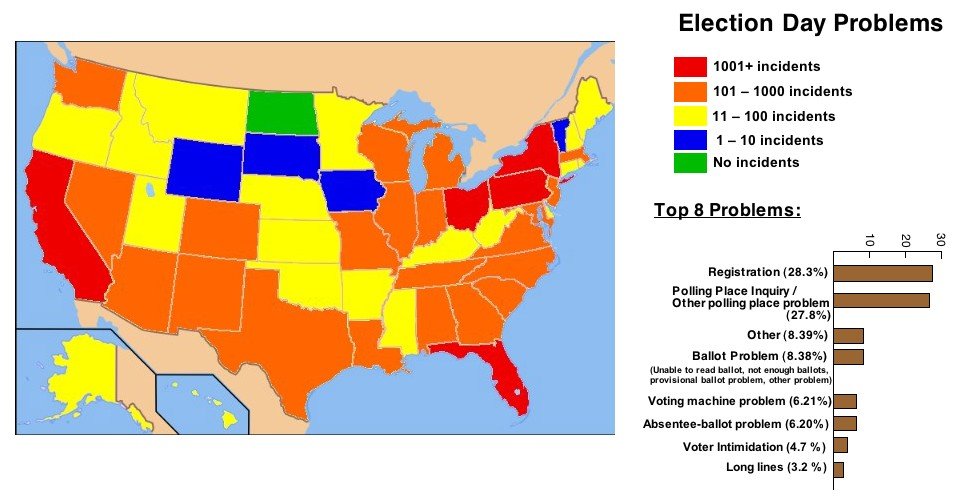
Map of election day problems reported to the Election Incident Reporting System

After the election, many blogs published false rumors claiming to show evidence that voter fraud had prevented Kerry from winning. Although the overall result of the election was not challenged by the Kerry campaign, Green Party presidential candidate David Cobb and Libertarian Party presidential candidate Michael Badnarik obtained a recount in Ohio. This recount was completed December 28, 2004, although on January 24, 2007, a jury convicted two Ohio elections officials of selecting precincts to recount where they already knew the hand total would match the machine total, thereby avoiding having to perform a full recount. Independent candidate Ralph Nader obtained a recount in 11 New Hampshire precincts that used Accuvote voting machines.

At the official counting of the electoral votes on January 6, an objection was made under the Electoral Count Act (now 3 U.S.C. § 15) to Ohio's electoral votes. Because the motion was supported by at least one member of both the House of Representatives and the Senate, the law required that the two houses separate to debate and vote on the objection. In the House of Representatives, the objection was supported by 31 Democrats. It was opposed by 178 Republicans, 88 Democrats and one independent. Not voting were 52 Republicans and 80 Democrats. Four people elected to the House had not yet taken office, and one seat was vacant. In the Senate, it was supported only by its maker, Barbara Boxer, with 74 senators opposed and 25 not voting. During the debate, no Senator argued that the outcome of the election should be changed by either court challenge or revote. Boxer claimed that she had made the motion not to challenge the outcome but "to cast the light of truth on a flawed system which must be fixed now".

Kerry would later state that "the widespread irregularities make it impossible to know for certain that the [Ohio] outcome reflected the will of the voters". In the same article, Democratic National Committee Chairman Howard Dean said: "I'm not confident that the election in Ohio was fairly decided... We know that there was substantial voter suppression, and the machines were not reliable. It should not be a surprise that the Republicans are willing to do things that are unethical to manipulate elections. That's what we suspect has happened."

== See also ==
- Timeline of the 2004 United States presidential election
- Ralph Nader's presidential campaigns
- Jesusland map
- Newspaper endorsements in the 2004 United States presidential election
- History of the United States (1991–2016)
- Kerry Fonda 2004 election photo controversy
- Second inauguration of George W. Bush
- White House shakeup (2004)
- 2004 Colorado Amendment 36
- Bush vs. Kerry Boxing, a 2004 boxing video game
- Sorry Everybody, a website to protest against the 2004 election results

=== Other elections ===
- 2004 United States gubernatorial elections
- 2004 United States House of Representatives elections
- 2004 United States Senate elections

== Sources ==
- Official Federal Election Commission Report, a PDF file, with the latest, most final, and complete vote totals available.
- "Presidential Results by Congressional District". Polidata. Washington, D.C.: Polidata.
- Barone, Michael J. The Almanac of American Politics: 2006 (2005)
- Daclon, Corrado Maria, US elections and war on terrorism (2004), Analisi Difesa, no. 50
- Evan Thomas, Eleanor Clift, and Staff of Newsweek. Election 2004 (2005)

=== Books ===
- Ceaser, James W. and Andrew E. Busch. Red Over Blue: The 2004 Elections and American Politics (2005), narrative history.
- Freeman, Steven F. and Joel Bleifuss, Foreword by U.S. Representative John Conyers, Jr. Was the 2004 Presidential Election Stolen? Exit Polls, Election Fraud, and the Official Count (Seven Stories Press, 2006)
- Green, John C. and Mark J. Rozell, eds. The Values Campaign?: The Christian Right and the 2004 Elections (2006)
- Miller, Mark Crispin. Fooled Again: How the Right Stole the 2004 Election (2005) –
- Sabato, Larry J. Divided States of America: The Slash And Burn Politics of the 2004 Presidential Election (2005)
- Stempel III, Guido H. and Thomas K. Hargrove, eds. The 21st-Century Voter: Who Votes, How They Vote, and Why They Vote (2 vol. 2015)
