= Thomas Harens =

American politician (born 1954)

Thomas J. Harens

Member of the Minnesota House of Representatives for the 65B district
- In office 1981–1982

Personal details
- Born: 1954 (age 71–72)
- Party: Minnesota Democratic–Farmer–Labor Party; Reform; Christian Freedom Party; Green Party

Thomas J. Harens (born 1954) is a former third-party candidate (Christian Freedom Party) for President of the United States in the 2004 presidential election in which he was only on the ballot in Minnesota. His running mate was Jennifer A. Ryan. He had created the Christian Freedom Party in June 2004, and filed his "affidavit of candidacy" with the Minnesota Secretary of State in August.

Some claimed Harens was a stalking horse for the John Kerry campaign, "a device for luring away Republican votes from George W. Bush in a tight election," an accusation he denied. He did, however, express a desire to have a spoiler effect on the election, hoping to win more votes than the margin between the major party candidates. The margin between Bush and Kerry in Minnesota was almost 100,000 votes, while Harens won only 2,387. The total for his new party was larger than the combined total in Minnesota of three of the established third parties, the Socialist Equality Party, Socialist Party and Socialist Workers Party.

Harens had previously run unsuccessfully for mayor of St. Paul, Minnesota, in 1997 as a member of the Reform Party. At the time he made his presidential run, he claimed he was still "technically a member" of that party.

Harens was elected to the Minnesota House of Representatives at age 25 as a member of the Minnesota Democratic-Farmer-Labor Party. He served from 1981 to 1982, when his district was redrawn and he also left "feeling abandoned" because of his anti-abortion views.

He attempted to run for the US Senate in Minnesota with the Green Party. He did not attend the Green Party of Minnesota Convention, and therefore was not endorsed.

Harens is a graduate of Winona State University.
