= David Cobb (activist) =

American activist and politician (1962–2026)

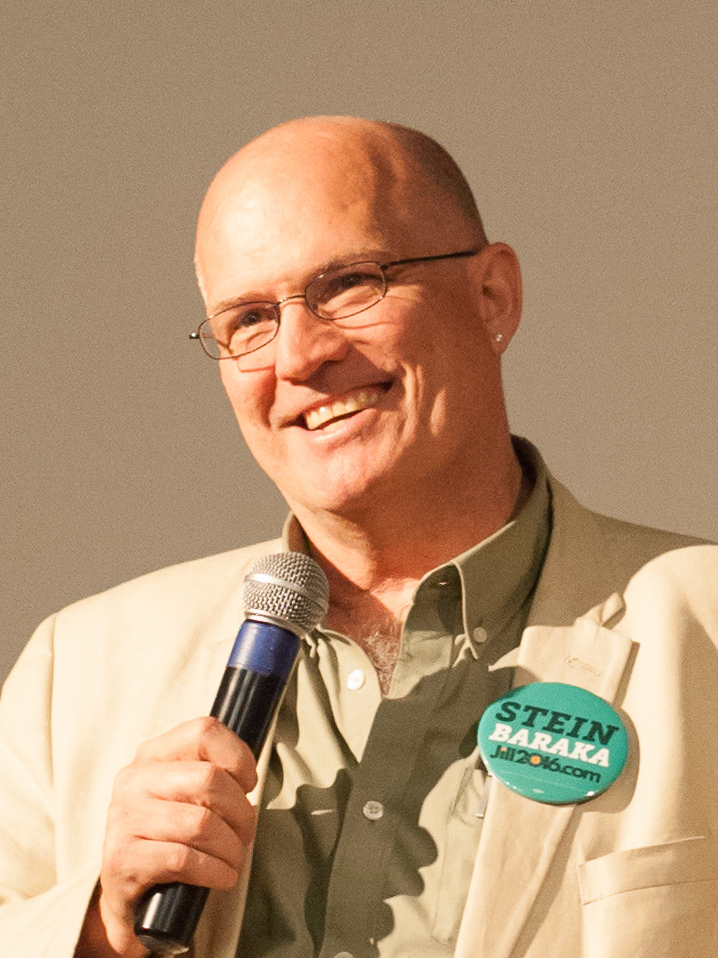
- Cobb in 2016
- Born: David Keith Cobb; December 24, 1962; San Leon, Texas, U.S.
- Died: September 7, 2026 (aged 63); Eureka, California, U.S.
- Education: University of Houston
- Occupations: Activist; attorney; campaign director
- Organization: Move to Amend
- Political party: Democratic (former); Green

David Keith Cobb (December 24, 1962 – September 7, 2026) was an American political activist who was the Green Party presidential candidate for the 2004 election. Cobb later became the campaign manager for fellow Green Jill Stein for her presidential run in 2016.

== 2004 presidential campaign ==
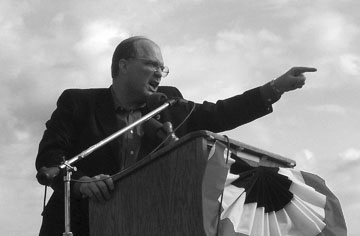
Cobb campaigning for President in Wisconsin in September 2004

In December 2003, Ralph Nader announced that he would not seek the Green Party nomination for president in 2004, Cobb became a front-runner for the nomination. On January 13, 2004, David Cobb won the first Green primary in the nation, that of the District of Columbia, beating local activist Sheila Bilyeu and several write-in candidates and gaining an early lead in the nomination scramble.

Nader eventually announced an independent campaign for president and sought the endorsement of the Green Party and other minor parties; his supporters continued to endorse a Nader victory in the various Green Party primary elections in states across the country. Shortly before, the Green Party presidential nominating convention, held in Milwaukee, Wisconsin, in June 2004, Nader selected Green Party member Peter Camejo as his running mate. On June 26, on the second ballot, the convention selected Cobb as the Green presidential candidate, the process had controversy as Nader had won the vast majority of actual Green Party votes in nearly all state primary elections, while Cobb received only 12.2 percent support. The party also nominated Pat LaMarche as its candidate for vice president.

Cobb stated his intention to run a campaign focused on building the Green Party and pursuing a "strategic states" or "smart states" strategy which would take into account the wishes by Greens in each state, and which otherwise would focus on states that traditionally are "safely" won by the Democratic candidate, or "safely" won by the Republican candidate, with a large margin of victory. The "safe states" are also referred to in campaign literature as "neglected states" because the Democratic and Republican candidates traditionally put most of their campaign energy into more competitive "swing states". Cobb's campaign stated that each state's campaign would aim to follow the endorsements expressed by local Greens. While some of Cobb's supporters endorsed swing state residents to vote for Democrat John Kerry in order to avoid the re-election of President George W. Bush, other Cobb supporters encouraged votes for Cobb and LaMarche everywhere. The candidates themselves used the phrase "vote your conscience", campaigning both in swing states such as Wisconsin and safe states such as California.

On October 8, 2004, Cobb was arrested in an act of civil disobedience, breaking a police line while protesting the Commission on Presidential Debates for excluding third-party candidates from the nationally televised debates in St. Louis, Missouri. Libertarian candidate Michael Badnarik was also arrested.

In the November 2004 presidential election, Cobb placed sixth in the popular vote total nationwide, with over 119,859 votes (0.10 percent), receiving no electoral votes. This represented a decline of over 90 percent support compared to the votes received by Nader.

== Post-election activities ==
After running for president, Cobb became a member of the board of directors for the Green Institute, and of the Sierra Club's national Corporate Accountability Committee, a Fellow with the Liberty Tree Foundation for the Democratic Revolution, on the Steering Committee of Democracy Unlimited of Humboldt County, along with being the group's campaigns director, and was a Principal with Program on Corporations, Law, and Democracy (POCLAD).

Cobb facilitated the founding convention of the Green Party of Louisiana during a two-day convention held on August 31 and September 1, 2002, in New Orleans.

He was also the co-founder of Cooperation Humboldt.

Cobb was the campaign manager for Green candidate Jill Stein in the 2016 United States presidential election.

He hosted the podcast Redneck Gone Green on the YouTube channel Democracy At Work.

== Death ==
Cobb died in Eureka, California, on September 7, 2026, at the age of 63. Originally reported as a heart attack during a morning walk, his wife later revealed during a YouTube video that Cobb suffered from depression due to the current political atmosphere of the United States. Cobb took his life during his morning walk.

== Election history ==
Texas general election, 2002: Texas Attorney General
Party	Candidate	Votes	%	±%
Republican	Greg Abbott	2,542,184	56.72	
Democratic	Kirk Watson	1,841,359	41.08	
Libertarian	Jon Roland	56,880	1.26	
Green	David Cobb	41,560	0.92	
Turnout		4,481,983		
Republican hold				

== See also ==
- 2004 United States election voting controversies
- 2004 United States presidential election

Party political offices
Preceded by Ralph Nader	Green nominee for President of the United States; 2004	Succeeded by Cynthia McKinney
