= List of female United States presidential and vice presidential candidates =

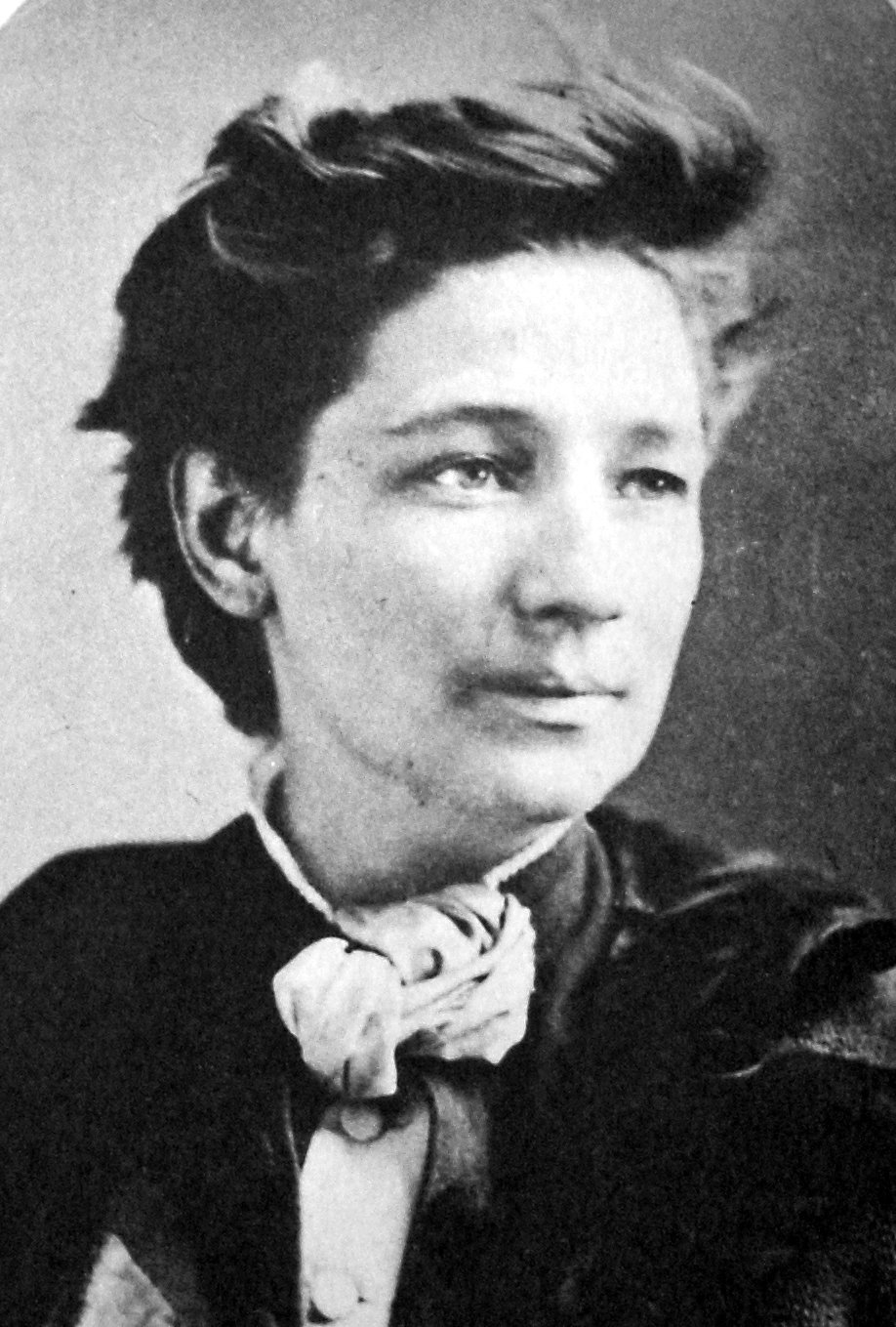
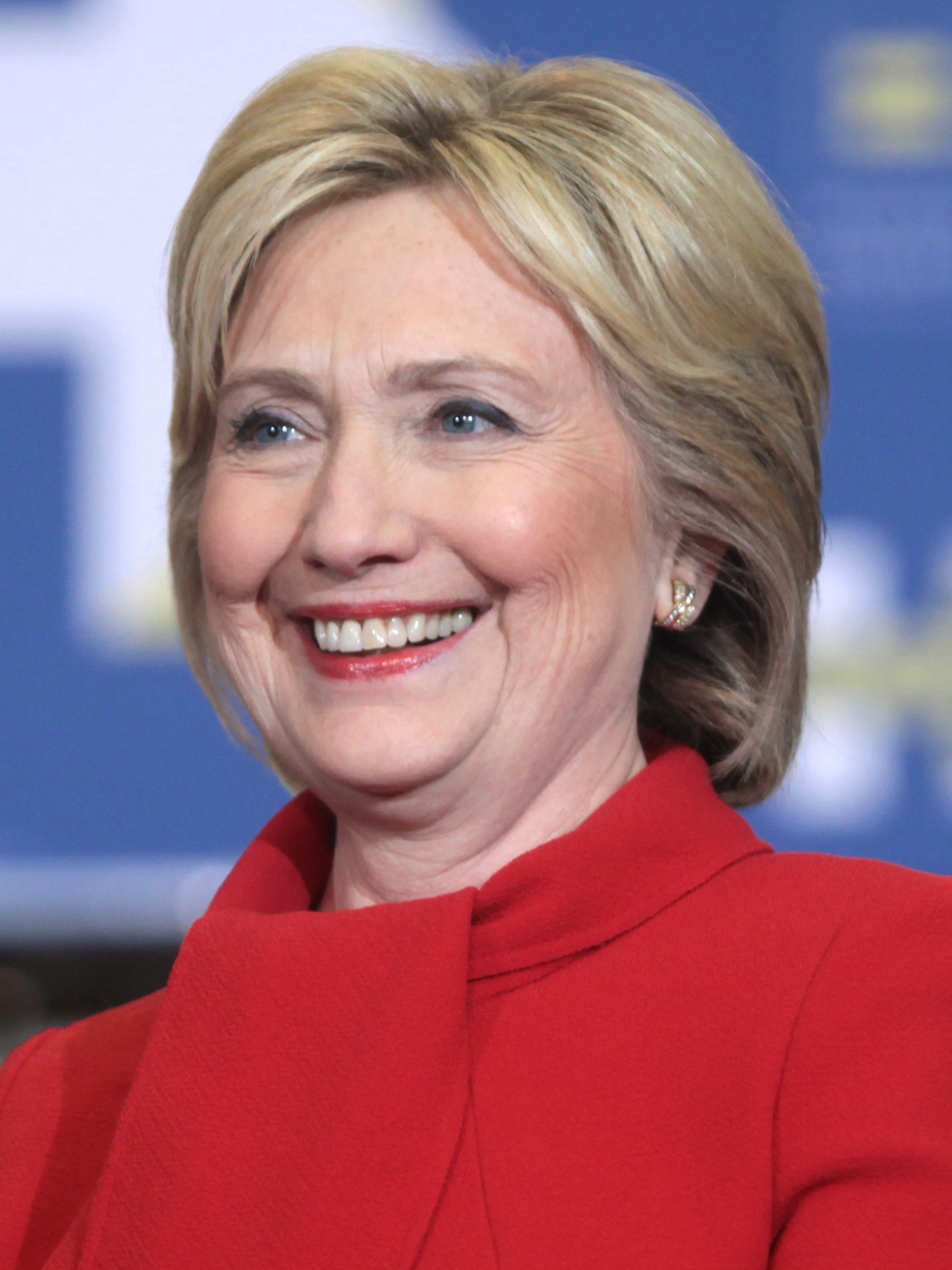
- Left: Victoria Woodhull is considered the first female presidential candidate for her 1872 candidacy.
- Center: Hillary Clinton was the first woman nominated for president by a major political party and the first woman to win the national popular vote in 2016.
- Right: Kamala Harris became the first female vice president in 2021. She became the second woman nominated for president by a major political party, in 2024.

The following is a list of female U.S. presidential and vice presidential nominees and invitees. Nominees are candidates nominated or otherwise selected by political parties for particular offices. Listed as nominees or nomination candidates are those women who achieved ballot access in at least one state (or, before the institution of government-printed ballots, had ballots circulated by their parties). They each may have won the nomination of one of the U.S. political parties (either one of the two major parties or one of the third parties), or made the ballot as an independent, and in either case must have votes in the election to qualify for this list. Exception is made for those few candidates whose parties lost ballot status for additional runs.

== History ==
=== 19th century ===
- Lydia Maria Child and Lucretia Mott received one vote apiece for president at the 1847 convention of the Liberty League, a caucus of the abolitionist Liberty Party. Mott was a candidate for vice president at the rump Liberty Party's 1848 convention, where she finished fifth out of a field of nine candidates.
- Victoria Woodhull was the first woman to formally run for president. She announced her candidacy in a letter to the New York Herald and was nominated by the national convention of the Equal Rights Party for the 1872 election. Frederick Douglass was nominated for vice president by the convention, but took no part in Woodhull's campaign. Only 33 at the time of the election, she was thus ineligible to serve as president due to the age requirement established by the United States Constitution. Congressional Quarterly's Guide to U.S. Elections records no votes for Woodhull in any state.
- Belva Ann Lockwood was twice a candidate for president, in 1884 and 1888. In 1884, she was nominated by the national convention of the Equal Rights Party, with Marietta Stow for vice president. In a petition to the United States Congress, Lockwood claimed to have received 4,149 votes in six states; she further alleged that election officials in Pennsylvania had destroyed ballots bearing her name. The members of the electoral college from Indiana, after voting for Grover Cleveland and Thomas A. Hendricks as pledged, cast a ceremonial "complimentary vote" for Lockwood and Stow.

=== 20th century ===
- Kate Richards O'Hare sought the vice presidential nomination of the Socialist Party in 1916 and received 11,388 votes (35.6%) from party members, finishing second behind the eventual nominee, George Ross Kirkpatrick.
- Laura Clay and Cora Wilson Stewart received one vote apiece at the 1920 Democratic National Convention on the 33rd and 36th ballots, respectively. They were the first women voted for as candidates for president at the national convention of a major American political party.
- Marie C. Brehm was the vice presidential candidate of the Prohibition Party in 1924.
- Former Wyoming Governor Nellie Tayloe Ross was a candidate for vice president at the 1928 Democratic National Convention. Her name was mentioned as a potential candidate as early as 1927, and the possibility of her nomination was the subject of serious speculation. Ross was formally nominated at the convention by Mrs. T. S. Oliver of Wyoming, who praised her "honesty, sincerity, and courage;" W. R. Chapman gave the seconding speech. She received 31 votes, finishing third out of a field of eleven candidates.
- Florence Garvin was the vice presidential candidate of the National Greenback Party in 1936.
- Charlotta Bass was the Progressive Party nominee for vice president in 1952. She was the first Black woman nominated for the office by an American political party.
- Maine Senator Margaret Chase Smith was a candidate for the Republican Party nomination in 1964, becoming the first woman to seek the nomination of a major party for president. She qualified for the ballot in six state primaries and finished second in the Illinois primary with 25% of the vote. She became the first woman to have her name placed in nomination for the presidency at the national convention of a major political party.
- Charlene Mitchell was the first Black woman to run for president and the first to receive valid votes in a general election. She received 1,076 votes in four states (California, Minnesota, Ohio, and Washington) as the nominee of the Communist Party in the 1968 election.
- New York Representative Shirley Chisholm was the first woman to run in the Democratic primary, the first Black candidate to contest the nomination of a major party, and the first such candidate to win a primary. She received the votes of 152 delegates at the 1972 Democratic National Convention, placing fourth in a field of 13 candidates. Her campaign drew support from prominent national feminist and civil rights leaders, including Gloria Steinem and Betty Friedan, who attempted unsuccessfully to stand as Chisholm delegates in the New York presidential primary.
- Hawaii Representative Patsy Mink was a candidate in the 1972 Democratic Party presidential primaries. She was the first Asian American woman to run for president.
- Tonie Nathan, the Libertarian Party's vice presidential candidate in 1972, was the first woman to receive an electoral vote, via faithless elector Roger MacBride.
- New York Representative Geraldine Ferraro was the first woman nominated for vice president by a major political party. Several figures had suggested the nomination of a female candidate ahead of the 1984 presidential election, including Kathy Bonk, communications director for the National Organization for Women, and Thomas E. Donilon, the national campaign coordinator for the Walter Mondale campaign. Ferraro was selected from a field of potential running mates, including Dianne Feinstein, Barbara Mikulski, and Pat Schroeder. Despite initial enthusiasm following her nomination, the Mondale–Ferarro ticket was defeated in the fall, carrying only Minnesota and Washington, D.C.
- Lenora Fulani became the first woman, and first African American to achieve ballot access and appear on the ballots of all fifty states as a candidate for President. Fulani was the nominee of the New Alliance Party in the 1988 presidential election. Fulani was again a candidate in the 1992 election.
- Winona LaDuke was the vice presidential nominee of the Green Party in 1996 and 2000 elections.
- Former U.S. Secretary of Labor Elizabeth Dole ran for the Republican presidential nomination in 2000, but withdrew prior to the primaries.

=== 21st century ===
- Illinois Senator Carol Moseley Braun ran in the 2004 Democratic Party presidential primaries. She withdrew from the race on January 15, 2004, four days before the Iowa caucus.
- Alaska Governor Sarah Palin was the second woman nominated for vice president by a major party and the first woman nominated by a Republican National Convention. She and her running mate, Arizona Senator John McCain, lost the 2008 United States presidential election to their Democratic challengers, Illinois Senator Barack Obama and Delaware Senator Joe Biden.
- New York Senator Hillary Clinton became the first woman to appear on the ballot in every state and territory in the 2008 Democratic Party presidential primaries. Despite narrowly losing the nomination, Clinton won more votes in 2008 than any female primary candidate in American history. Clinton later became the first woman nominated for president by a major party after winning a majority of pledged delegates in the 2016 Democratic Party presidential primaries, and was formally nominated by the Democratic National Convention on July 26, 2016. As a major party nominee, Clinton became the first woman to participate in a presidential debate and the first to carry a state in a general election. Clinton became the first woman to win the national popular vote, receiving nearly 66 million ballots to Donald Trump's 63 million, but lost the electoral college and thus the presidency.
- The Green Party has run a female candidate for president four times: Cynthia McKinney in 2008 and Jill Stein in 2012, 2016, and 2024. Stein's 1.5 million votes in 2016 represent the third-largest total for a female presidential candidate in U.S. history as of 2024. Pat LaMarche in 2004, Rosa Clemente in 2008, Cheri Honkala in 2012, and Angela Nicole Walker in 2020 were Green Party candidates for vice president.
- The Party for Socialism and Liberation has nominated a female presidential candidate in every election which the party has contested: Gloria La Riva in 2008, 2016, and 2020; Peta Lindsay in 2012, and Claudia De la Cruz in 2024. (La Riva in 2016 and 2020 and De la Cruz in 2024 were jointly nominated by the Peace and Freedom Party.)
- Minnesota Representative Michele Bachmann was a candidate in the 2012 Republican Party presidential primaries. On August 13, 2011, she won the Ames Straw Poll with 28.6% of the vote, the first woman to do so. Despite this, she finished sixth in the Iowa caucus and suspended her campaign shortly thereafter, on January 4, 2012.
- Roseanne Barr was a candidate in the 2012 Green Party presidential primaries. She was defeated by Stein, and subsequently ran as the nominee of the Peace and Freedom Party, garnering 67,326 votes.
- Carly Fiorina was a candidate in the 2016 Republican Party presidential primaries before suspending her campaign on February 10, 2016. On April 27, Texas Senator Ted Cruz announced Fiorina would be his vice presidential running mate in the event he won the Republican nomination; however, Cruz withdrew from the race on May 3 after losing the Indiana primary.
- Faith Spotted Eagle received a faithless electoral vote from Washington in 2016, becoming the first Indigenous American to receive an electoral vote for president.
- Six women ran in the 2020 Democratic Party presidential primaries: Massachusetts Senator Elizabeth Warren, California Senator Kamala Harris, Minnesota Senator Amy Klobuchar, New York Senator Kirsten Gillibrand, Hawaii Representative Tulsi Gabbard, and author Marianne Williamson. All six women subsequently participated in at least one televised debate. Prior to 2020, only five women had ever appeared on a major party's primary debate stage (Chisholm in 1972, Braun in 2004, Bachman in 2012, Clinton in 2008 and 2016, and Fiorina in 2016). The opening night of the first debate, which took place on June 26–27, 2019, was a major milestone, as it featured three women: Warren, Klobuchar, and Gabbard; Harris, Gillibrand, and Williamson participated on the second night. This was the first major party presidential primary in which multiple women competed.
- Jo Jorgensen was the Libertarian nominee for president in 2020. She is the first woman to be nominated for president by that party. Jorgensen's 1.9 million votes represented the second-highest total for a female presidential candidate at the time.
- Harris was subsequently the 2020 Democratic vice presidential candidate. She became the first female, Black, and Asian American vice president upon winning the 2020 election, defeating the Republican candidate, incumbent Vice President Mike Pence. Following Joe Biden's withdrawal from the 2024 election, Harris announced her candidacy for the 2024 Democratic presidential nomination. On July 22, she received enough pledged delegate support to become the presumptive Democratic nominee for president. She later went on be officially nominated by the Democratic National Convention by roll call on August 6, 2024, but lost to former president Donald Trump in the general election.
- Williamson challenged Biden in the 2024 Democratic Party presidential primaries. Although she did not win pledged delegate support in any contest, her 473,761 votes represented the third-best showing for any candidate, behind Biden and Minnesota Representative Dean Phillips. (Uncommitted delegates received 706,591 votes.) After twice suspending and resuming her campaign, Williamson ended her candidacy for the last time on June 29, 2024, after deciding not to challenge Harris at the 2024 Democratic National Convention.
- Former South Carolina Governor Nikki Haley ran in the 2024 Republican Party presidential primaries. She received 97 delegates and over 4 million popular votes, finishing second to the eventual nominee, former President Donald Trump. She became the first woman to win a Republican primary after carrying Vermont and the District of Columbia.

== Presidential candidates ==
=== Candidates who received electoral college votes ===
Year	Name	Party	Running mate	Electoral votes	Total electoral votes	Winner
2016	Hillary Clinton	Democratic Party	Tim Kaine	227	538	Donald Trump
2024	Kamala Harris	Democratic Party	Tim Walz	226	538	Donald Trump
2016	Faith Spotted Eagle	Democratic Party	Winona LaDuke (Note: Did not run for office. Won an electoral vote from Robert Satiacum Jr. who acted as a faithless elector)	1	538	Donald Trump

=== General election candidates by popular vote ===
This list, sorted by the number of votes received, includes female candidates who have competed for President of the United States in a general election and received over 40,000 votes.

† Popular vote winner

Year	Picture	Name	Party	Votes	Elected president
2024		Kamala Harris	Democratic Party	75,017,613	Donald Trump
2016		Hillary Clinton	Democratic Party	65,853,514†	Donald Trump
2020		Jo Jorgensen	Libertarian Party	1,865,724	Joe Biden
2016		Jill Stein	Green Party	1,457,218	Donald Trump
2024		Jill Stein	Green Party	862,049	Donald Trump
2012		Jill Stein	Green Party	468,907	Barack Obama
1988		Lenora Fulani	New Alliance Party	217,219	George H. W. Bush
2008		Cynthia McKinney	Green Party	161,797	Barack Obama
1972		Linda Jenness	Socialist Workers Party	83,380 (Note: In 1972 in Arizona, Pima and Yavapai counties had a ballot malfunction that counted many votes for both a major party candidate and Linda Jenness of the Socialist Workers Party. A court ordered that the ballots be counted for both. As a consequence, Jenness received 16% and 8% of the vote in Pima and Yavapai, respectively. 30,579 of her 30,945 Arizona votes are from those two counties. Some sources don't count these votes for Jenness.)	Richard Nixon
1992		Lenora Fulani	New Alliance Party	73,714	Bill Clinton
1984		Sonia Johnson	Citizens Party	72,200	Ronald Reagan
2012		Roseanne Barr	Peace and Freedom Party	67,326	Barack Obama
1976		Margaret Wright	People's Party	49,024	Jimmy Carter
1940		Gracie Allen	Surprise Party	42,000	Franklin D. Roosevelt

=== Primary election candidates by popular vote ===
This list, sorted by the number of votes received, includes female candidates who have sought their party's presidential nomination in at least one primary or caucus and received over 5,000 votes. Note that Kamala Harris, the 2024 Democratic Party presidential candidate, is not listed because she did not participate in the primaries. (Note: Incumbent president Joe Biden competed in the 2024 Democratic Party presidential primaries and secured the nomination after winning 98.9% of the delegates. However, Biden withdrew from the election on July 21 following age and health concerns. Biden would subsequently endorse Harris and she launched her campaign the same day. She became the presumptive Democratic presidential nominee on July 22 and became the official nominee on August 5 after a formal roll call vote by the Democratic National Convention.)
Party nominee

Year	Picture	Name	Party	Votes	Contests won	Party nominee
2008		Hillary Clinton	Democratic Party	17,857,501	23	Barack Obama
2016		Hillary Clinton	Democratic Party	16,914,722	34	Hillary Clinton
2024		Nikki Haley	Republican Party	4,381,799	2	Donald Trump
2020		Elizabeth Warren	Democratic Party	2,780,679	0	Joe Biden
2020		Amy Klobuchar	Democratic Party	524,375	0	Joe Biden
2024		Marianne Williamson	Democratic Party	443,784	0	Kamala Harris
2020		Marianne Williamson	Democratic Party	22,334	0	Joe Biden
1972		Shirley Chisholm	Democratic Party	430,703	1 (Note: Shirley Chisholm won the New Jersey primary in 1972 which was a non-delegate-awarding, presidential preference ballot that the major candidates were not listed in and that the only other candidate who was listed had already withdrawn. At the Democratic convention she won a plurality of delegates from Mississippi and Louisiana, neither of which held primaries.)	George McGovern
2020		Tulsi Gabbard	Democratic Party	261,253	0	Joe Biden
1964		Margaret Chase Smith	Republican Party	227,007	0	Barry Goldwater
2004		Carol Moseley Braun	Democratic Party	103,189	0	John Kerry
1996		Elvena Lloyd-Duffie	Democratic Party	91,929	0	Bill Clinton
2012		Michele Bachmann	Republican Party	41,170	0	Mitt Romney
2016		Carly Fiorina	Republican Party	40,666	0	Donald Trump
1996		Heather Anne Harder	Democratic Party	29,156	0	Bill Clinton
2024		Terrisa Bukovinac	Democratic Party	18,931	0	Kamala Harris
2024		Jill Stein	Green Party	16,597	20	Jill Stein
1972		Patsy Mink	Democratic Party	8,286	0	George McGovern
1964		Fay Carpenter Swain	Democratic Party	7,140	0	Lyndon B. Johnson
2024		Rachel Swift	Republican Party	7,017	0	Donald Trump
2020		Jo Jorgensen	Libertarian Party	5,123	2	Jo Jorgensen

=== All candidates ===
==== Party nominees ====
Year	Name	Party	Running mate	Votes	Ballot access
1872	Victoria Woodhull	Equal Rights Party	Frederick Douglass	(Note: Victoria Woodhull's votes don't appear to have been counted. See, e.g. Victoria Woodhull, the Spirit to Run the White House for more information.)	0 states
1884	Belva Ann Lockwood	Equal Rights Party	Marietta Stow	4,149	6 states
1888	Belva Ann Lockwood	Equal Rights Party	First: Alfred Love Second: Charles Stuart Wells (Note: Lockwood first ran with Love, but when she dropped out of the race, she ended up choosing Wells as the final candidate.)	(Note: Belva Ann Lockwood won an unspecified number of votes in 1888 that was fewer than her 1884 total of 4,149. See Frances A. Cook, Belva Ann Lockwood: For Peace, Justice, and President.)	
1940	Gracie Allen	Surprise Party	Not applicable	42,000	
1952	Ellen Linea W. Jensen	Washington Peace Party			
1952	Mary Kennery	American Party			
1952	Agnes Waters	National Woman's Party			
1968	Charlene Mitchell	Communist Party	Michael Zagarell	1,075	2 states
1972	Linda Jenness	Socialist Workers Party	Andrew Pulley	83,380	25 states
1972	Evelyn Reed	Socialist Workers Party	Andrew Pulley	13,878	
1976	Margaret Wright	People's Party	Benjamin Spock	49,024	
1980	Ellen McCormack	Right to Life Party	Carroll Driscoll	32,327	
1980	Maureen Smith	Peace and Freedom Party	Elizabeth Cervantes Barron	18,116	
1980	Deirdre Griswold	Workers World Party	Gavrielle Holmes (Note: Naomi Cohen appeared on the ballot in Ohio in place of Deirdre Griswold's running mate Gavrielle Holmes)	13,300	
1984	Sonia Johnson	Citizens Party	Richard Walton	72,200	19 states
1984	Gavrielle Holmes (Note: Gavrielle Holmes was an alternate candidate for Larry Holmes.)	Workers World Party	Gloria La Riva (Note: Milton Vera was an alternate candidate for Gloria La Riva in some states, including Iowa and Ohio.)	2,656 (Note: The vote total is for the Gavrielle Holmes ticket only.)	2 states
1988	Lenora Fulani	New Alliance Party	Joyce Dattner	217,219	34 states
1988	Lenora Fulani	New Alliance Party	Wynonia Burke	217,219	4 states
1988	Lenora Fulani	New Alliance Party	Mamie Moore	217,219	9 states
1988	Willa Kenoyer	Socialist Party, Liberty Union Party	Ron Ehrenreich	3,928	
1992	Lenora Fulani	New Alliance Party	Maria Elizabeth Muñoz	73,714	
1992	Helen Halyard	Socialist Equality Party	Fred Mazelis	3,050	
1992	Isabell Masters	Looking Back Party	Walter Masters	327	
1992	Gloria La Riva	Workers World Party	Larry Holmes	181	
1996	Monica Moorehead	Workers World Party	Gloria La Riva	29,083	
1996	Marsha Feinland	Peace and Freedom Party	Kate McClatchy	25,332	
1996	Mary Cal Hollis	Socialist Party, Liberty Union Party	Eric Chester	4,766	
1996	Diane Beall Templin	The American Party	Gary Van Horn	1,847	
1996	Isabell Masters	Looking Back Party	Shirley Jean Masters	752	
2000	Monica Moorehead	Workers World Party	Gloria La Riva	4,795	
2000	Cathy Gordon Brown	Independent	Sabrina R. Allen	1,606	
2004	Diane Beall Templin	American Party	Albert B. "Al" Moore	(lost ballot status)	
2008	Cynthia McKinney	Green Party	Rosa Clemente	161,797	32 states
2008	Gloria La Riva	Party for Socialism and Liberation	Eugene Puryear (Note: Robert Moses was on the ballot in some states.)	7,427	
2008	Diane Beall Templin	The American Party	Linda Patterson	(lost ballot status)	
2012	Jill Stein	Green Party	Cheri Honkala	468,907	36 states
2012	Roseanne Barr	Peace and Freedom Party	Cindy Sheehan	67,326	
2012	Peta Lindsay	Party for Socialism and Liberation	Yari Osorio	9,388	
2016	Hillary Clinton	Democratic Party	Tim Kaine	65,853,516	50 states + DC
2016	Jill Stein	Green Party	Ajamu Baraka	1,457,044	43 states + DC
2016	Gloria La Riva	Peace and Freedom Party	Dennis Banks	43,742	8 states
2016	Alyson Kennedy	Socialist Workers Party	Osborne Hart	10,348	7 states
2016	Monica Moorehead	Workers World Party	Lamont Lilly	3,722	
2016	Lynn S. Kahn	Independent	Kathleen Monahan	5,610	
2016	Khadijah Jacob-Fambro	Revolutionary Party	Milton Fambro	748	
2020	Jo Jorgensen	Libertarian Party	Spike Cohen	1,865,724	50 states + DC
2020	Barbara Bellar	Republican Party (write-in)	Kendra Bryant		10 states
2020	Shereen A. Elbaz	Democratic Party (write-in)	None		Washington
2020	Betsy P. Elgar	Constitution Party (write-in)	None		Washington
2020	Katherine Forbes	Independent	None		Minnesota, Utah
2020	Alyson Kennedy	Socialist Workers Party	Malcolm Jarrett	6,791	6 states
2020	Kathryn Gibson	Independent	None		3 states
2020	Lois Marie Gillaspie-Greenwood	Independent	None		West Virginia
2020	Tara Renee Hunter	Independent	None		Michigan
2020	Princess Khadijah Jacob-Fambro	Unaffiliated	Khadijah Jacob Sr.		Colorado
2020	Ricki Sue King	Genealogy Know Your Family History	Dayna R. Chandler		Iowa
2020	Gloria La Riva	Party for Socialism and Liberation	Sunil Freeman (12 states) (Note: Freeman replaced the original vice presidential nominee, Leonard Peltier of Peace and Freedom, who withdrew for health reasons.)/Leonard Peltier (IL, MN, TX)	85,464	15 states
2020	Susan B. Lochocki	Independent	None		5 states
2020	Valerie McCray	Independent	None		Indiana
2020	Deborah Rouse	Independent	Sheila Cannon		11 states
2020	Jade Simmons	Independent	Claudeliah Roze (LA, TX)/Melissa Nixon (FL)	6,958	3 states
2020	Mary Ruth Caro Simmons	Write-in	Sherrie Dow		9 states
2020	Silvia Stagg	Republican Party (write-in)	None		10 states
2020	Sheila "Samm" Tittle	Constitution Party	David Carl Sandige	1,806	New Mexico
2020	Sharon Wallace	Democratic Party (write-in)	Karen M. Short		Maryland
2020	Angela Marie Walls-Windhauser	Independent	Charles Tolbert		Florida
2020	Karynn Weinstein	Independent	David Weinstein		Connecticut
2020	Demetra Wysinger	WXYZ New Day	Cedric D. Jefferson		Alaska, Minnesota
2024	Kamala Harris	Democratic Party	Tim Walz		50 states + DC
2024	Claudia De la Cruz	Party for Socialism and Liberation	Karina Garcia		16 states
2024	Laura Ebke	Libertarian Party of New Mexico	Trisha Butler		New Mexico
2024	Rachele Fruit	Socialist Workers Party	Dennis Richter (Note: Margaret Trowe was originally named the party's vice presidential nominee but withdrew due to health issues.)		5 states
2024	Mattie Preston	Godliness, Truth, Justice Party	Shannel Conner		Louisiana
2024	Jasmine Sherman	Green Party of Alaska	Tanda BluBear	(not on the ballot)	
2024	Jill Stein	Green Party	Butch Ware		33 states
Year	Name	Party	Running mate	Votes	Ballot access

==== Not nominated by party ====
Candidates who failed to receive their parties' nomination.

Year	Name	Party	Details	Party nominee
1884	Abigail Scott Duniway	Equal Rights	Rejected nomination.	Belva Ann Lockwood
1920	Laura Clay	Democratic		James M. Cox
1920	Cora Wilson Stewart	Democratic		James M. Cox
1924	Cora Wilson Stewart	Democratic	1 vote on 1st and 15th ballots	John W. Davis
1940	Anna Milburn	National Greenback	Declined nomination	John Zahnd
1964	Margaret Chase Smith	Republican	Received 227,007 votes in Republican primary and won 27 delegates at the Republican convention	Barry Goldwater
1964	Fay T. Carpenter Swain	Democratic	7,140 votes in Indiana primary	Lyndon B. Johnson
1972	Shirley Chisholm	Democratic	152 votes at convention	George McGovern
1972	Patsy Mink	Democratic		George McGovern
1972	Bella Abzug	Democratic		George McGovern
1976	Barbara Jordan	Democratic	1 vote at convention	Jimmy Carter
1976	Ellen McCormack	Democratic	22 votes at national convention	Jimmy Carter
1980	Koryne Kaneski Horbal	Democratic	5 votes at convention	Jimmy Carter
1980	Alice Tripp	Democratic	2 votes at convention	Jimmy Carter
1984	Martha Kirkland	Democratic	1 vote at convention	Walter Mondale
1984	Mary Ruwart	Libertarian	77 votes at convention (1st ballot); 99 votes at convention (2nd ballot; 3rd place overall)	David Bergland
1984	Tonie Nathan	Libertarian	53 votes at convention (1st ballot; 4th place)	David Bergland
1988	Pat Schroeder	Democratic		Michael Dukakis
1992	Tennie Rogers	Republican	754 votes in Texas primary	George H. W. Bush
1992	Georgiana Doerschuck	Republican	58 votes in New Hampshire primary	George H. W. Bush
1992	Caroline Killeen	Democratic	96 votes in New Hampshire primary	Bill Clinton
1996	Elvena E. Lloyd-Duffie	Democratic	13,025 votes in AR primary; 10,876 votes (6th place) in TX primary; 40,758 in OK primary (3rd place); 11,620 votes (3rd place) in LA primary; 15,650 votes (2nd place) in IL primary	Bill Clinton
1996	Heather Anne Harder	Democratic	28,772 votes (3rd place) in TX primary; 376 votes in NH primary and two Republican write-in votes; 6 votes in IL primary	Bill Clinton
1996	Caroline Killeen	Democratic	118 votes in New Hampshire primary	Bill Clinton
1996	Susan Gail Ducey	Republican	539 votes (9th place) in AZ primary; 152 votes (12th place) in NH primary; 1,092 votes (8th place) in TX primary	Bob Dole
1996	Isabell Masters	Republican	1052 votes (7th place) in Oklahoma primary	Bob Dole
1996	Mary "France" LeTulle	Republican	650 votes (9th place) in Texas primary; 290 votes in Nevada primary	Bob Dole
1996	Georgiana Doerschuck	Republican	140 votes in New Hampshire primary	Bob Dole
1996	Tennie Rogers	Republican	35 votes at Mississippi primary; 12 votes in New Hampshire primary	Bob Dole
2000	Heather Anne Harder	Democratic	1,358 votes in AZ primary; 192 votes (8th place) in NH primary, 1 Republican write-in vote	Al Gore
2000	Elizabeth Dole	Republican	231 write-in votes in NH primary	George W. Bush
2000	Dorian Yeager	Republican	98 votes (10th place) in NH primary	George W. Bush
2000	Angel Joy Chavis Rocker	Republican	6 votes in Alabama straw poll	George W. Bush
2004	Lorna Salzman	Green	40 votes at convention (5th place)	David Cobb
2004	JoAnne Bier Beeman	Green	14 votes at national convention	David Cobb
2004	Carol A. Miller	Green	10 votes at national convention	David Cobb
2004	Sheila Bilyeu	Green	2 votes at national convention	David Cobb
2004	Florence Walker	Democratic	246 votes (6th place) in Washington, D.C., primary	John Kerry
2004	Katherine Bateman	Democratic	68 votes (14th place) in New Hampshire primary	John Kerry
2004	Jeanne Chebib	Democratic	43 votes (12th place) in the Washington, D.C., primary	John Kerry
2004	Caroline Killeen	Democratic	31 votes (19th place) in New Hampshire primary	John Kerry
2004	Mildred T. Glover	Democratic	11 votes (22nd place) in New Hampshire primary; 4,039 votes (8th place) in Maryland primary	John Kerry
2004	Carol Moseley Braun	Democratic	Withdrew in January 2004; 103,189 votes	John Kerry
2004	Millie Howard	Republican	239 votes (13th place) in New Hampshire primary	George W. Bush
2008	Hillary Clinton	Democratic	Second place in the Democratic primaries, winning 1,726½ delegate votes and more primaries than any other woman in history.	Barack Obama
2008	Caroline Killeen	Democratic	11 votes in New Hampshire primary	Barack Obama
2008	Mary Ruwart	Libertarian	152 votes at convention (2nd place; reached 1st place on 5th ballot before being defeated on 6th ballot)	Bob Barr
2008	Christine Smith	Libertarian	6 votes at national convention (8th place)	Bob Barr
2008	Kat Swift	Green	38 votes at national convention (3rd place)	Cynthia McKinney
2008	Elaine Brown	Green	Withdrew in December 2007; 9 pledged delegates (6th place)	Cynthia McKinney
2008	Nan Garrett	Green	Withdrew in February 2007	Cynthia McKinney
2008	Susan Gail Ducey	Republican	2 votes (3-way tie for 8th place) in Tulsa, Oklahoma straw poll	John McCain
2012	Susan Gail Ducey	Constitution	15 votes at national convention	Virgil Goode
2012	Roseanne Barr	Green	72 votes at national convention (2nd place)	Jill Stein
2012	Michele Bachmann	Republican	Withdrew in January 2012.	Mitt Romney
2016	Carly Fiorina	Republican	Withdrew in February 2016 with 1 pledged delegate in Iowa (10th place with 40,666 votes)	Donald Trump
2016	Sedinam Moyowasifza-Curry	Green	13 votes at national convention (3rd place)	Jill Stein
2020	Souraya Faas	Alliance	Withdrew before convention.	Rocky De La Fuente
2020	Elizabeth Warren	Democratic	Withdrew in March 2020 with 83 pledged delegates.	Joe Biden
2020	Amy Klobuchar	Democratic	Withdrew in March 2020 with 7 pledged delegates.	Joe Biden
2020	Tulsi Gabbard	Democratic	Withdrew in March 2020 with 2 pledged delegates.	Joe Biden
2020	Kamala Harris	Democratic	Withdrew in December 2019. Became the 2020 Democratic nominee for vice president, and won becoming the first female vice president.	Joe Biden
2020	Kirsten Gillibrand	Democratic	Withdrew in August 2019.	Joe Biden
2020	Marianne Williamson	Democratic	Withdrew in January 2020.	Joe Biden
2020	Cherie DeVille	Democratic	Withdrew in January 2019.	Joe Biden
2020	Sorinne Ardeleanu	Libertarian	2 write-in votes at convention (1st ballot); 1 write-in vote at convention (4th ballot)	Jo Jorgensen
2020	Laura Ebke	Libertarian	1 write-in vote at convention (3rd ballot)	Jo Jorgensen
2020	Souraya Faas	Libertarian	Withdrew in May 2020 after failing to qualify in the nomination round.	Jo Jorgensen
2020	Kim Ruff	Libertarian	11 votes in the nomination round.	Jo Jorgensen
2020	Susan Buchser Lochocki	Green	1 vote at national convention	Howie Hawkins
2020	Sedinam Moyowasifza-Curry	Green		Howie Hawkins
2024	Jacqueline Abernathy	American Solidarity	207 votes in online primary	Peter Sonski
2024	Susan Buchser-Lochocki	Green (Alaska)	Unregistered candidate	Jasmine Sherman
2024	Nikki Haley	Republican	Withdrew in March 2024 with 97 pledged delegates	Donald Trump
2024	Brittany Jones	Green (Alaska)	Unaffiliated candidate	Jasmine Sherman
2024	Mary Maxwell	Republican	287 votes (9th place) in New Hampshire primary	Donald Trump
2024	Jasmine Sherman (Note: Sherman is the Green Party of Alaska nominee but not on the ballot in Alaska.)	Green	72 votes with 10 pledged delegates; 13 delegates at convention	Jill Stein
2024	Rachel Swift	Republican	7,019 votes	Donald Trump
2024	Suzzanna Tanner	Green (Alaska)	Independent candidate	Jasmine Sherman
2024	Samm Tittle	Constitution	2 votes at national convention	Randall Terry
2024	Marianne Williamson	Democratic	Withdrew in July 2024.	Kamala Harris
Year	Name	Party	Details	Nomination winner

== Vice presidential candidates ==
=== Candidates who received electoral college votes ===
Elected vice president

Year	Name	Party	Running mate	Electoral votes	Total electoral votes	Winner
2020	Kamala Harris	Democratic Party	Joe Biden	306	538	Kamala Harris
2008	Sarah Palin	Republican Party	John McCain	173	538	Joe Biden
1984	Geraldine Ferraro	Democratic Party	Walter Mondale	13	538	George H. W. Bush
2016	Elizabeth Warren	Not applicable (Note: Elizabeth Warren was not a candidate for vice president in 2016, but she received one electoral vote each from faithless electors in Hawaii and Washington.)	Not applicable	2	538	Mike Pence
2016	Maria Cantwell	Not applicable (Note: Maria Cantwell was not a candidate for vice president in 2016, but she received one electoral vote from a Washington faithless elector.)	Not applicable	1	538	Mike Pence
2016	Susan Collins	Not applicable (Note: Susan Collins was not a candidate for vice president in 2016, but she received one electoral vote from a Washington faithless elector.)	Not applicable	1	538	Mike Pence
2016	Carly Fiorina	Not applicable (Note: Carly Fiorina was not a candidate for vice president in the general election in 2016, but she received one electoral vote from a Texas faithless elector.)	Not applicable	1	538	Mike Pence
2016	Winona LaDuke	Not applicable (Note: Winona LaDuke was not a candidate for vice president in 2016, but she received one electoral vote from a Washington faithless elector.)	Not applicable	1	538	Mike Pence
1972	Tonie Nathan	Libertarian Party (Note: Tonie Nathan and John Hospers received one electoral vote from a Virginia faithless elector.)	John Hospers	1	538	Spiro Agnew

=== General election candidates by popular vote ===
This list, sorted by the number of votes received, includes female candidates who have run for Vice President of the United States and received over 100,000 votes. Note that the vote for vice president is not separate in the United States and is identical to that for the presidential nominees.
Elected vice president

Year	Picture	Name	Party	Running mate	Votes	Elected vice president
2020		Kamala Harris	Democratic Party	Joe Biden	81,268,924	Kamala Harris
2008		Sarah Palin	Republican Party	John McCain	59,948,323	Joe Biden
1984		Geraldine Ferraro	Democratic Party	Walter Mondale	37,577,352	George H. W. Bush
2000		Winona LaDuke	Green Party	Ralph Nader	2,883,105	Dick Cheney
1996		Winona LaDuke	Green Party	Ralph Nader	596,780	Al Gore
2016		Mindy Finn	Independent	Evan McMullin	731,991	Mike Pence
1996		Jo Jorgensen	Libertarian Party	Harry Browne	485,798	Al Gore
2012		Cheri Honkala	Green Party	Jill Stein	469,628	Joe Biden
2000		Ezola Foster	Reform Party	Pat Buchanan	449,225	Dick Cheney
2020		Angela Walker	Green Party	Howie Hawkins	404,021	Kamala Harris
1992		Nancy Lord	Libertarian Party	Andre Marrou	290,087	Al Gore
1980		LaDonna Harris	Citizens Party	Barry Commoner	233,052	George H. W. Bush
2008		Rosa Clemente	Green Party	Cynthia McKinney	161,797	Joe Biden
1988		Joyce Dattner	New Alliance Party	Lenora Fulani	143,858	Dan Quayle
1952		Charlotta Bass	Progressive Party	Vincent Hallinan	140,023	Richard Nixon
2004		Pat LaMarche	Green Party	David Cobb	119,859	Dick Cheney

=== All candidates ===
==== Party nominees ====
Year	Name	Party	Running mate	Votes
1884	Marietta Stow	Equal Rights Party	Belva Ann Lockwood	4,149
1924	Marie Brehm	Prohibition Party	Herman P. Faris	56,289
1932	Florence Garvin	National Party	John Zahnd	1,645
1936	Florence Garvin	National Greenback Party	John Zahnd	
1948	Grace Carlson	Socialist Workers Party	Farrell Dobbs	13,614
1952	Charlotta Bass	Progressive Party	Vincent Hallinan	140,023
1952	Myra Tanner Weiss	Socialist Workers Party	Farrell Dobbs	10,312
1952	Vivien Kellems	Constitution Party* (Note: The candidates of the Constitution Party varied by state; Harry F. Byrd seems to have been considered the main vice presidential candidate.)	Douglas MacArthur	943* (Note: The candidates of the Constitution Party varied by state; the votes included here are ones known to be for the MacArthur-Kellems ticket specifically and not the MacArthur-Byrd ticket. The MacArthur-Kellems ticket's total might have been higher than 943.)
1956	Georgia Cozzini	Socialist Labor Party	Eric Hass	44,300
1956	Myra Tanner Weiss	Socialist Workers Party	Farrell Dobbs	7,797
1956	Ann Marie Yezo	American Third Party	Henry B. Krajewski	1,829
1960	Myra Tanner Weiss	Socialist Workers Party	Farrell Dobbs	60,166
1960	Georgia Cozzini	Socialist Labor Party	Eric Hass	47,521
1968	Peggy Terry (Note: Douglas Fitzgerald Dowd was Cleaver's running mate in some states, and Jerry Rubin had also been nominated.)	Peace and Freedom Party	Eldridge Cleaver	
1972	Genevieve Gundersen	Socialist Labor Party	Louis Fisher	53,814
1972	Tonie Nathan	Libertarian Party	John Hospers	3,674
1976	Willie Mae Reid	Socialist Workers Party	Peter Camejo	90,986
1976	Constance Blomen	Socialist Labor Party	Jules Levin	9,616
1980	La Donna Harris	Citizens Party	Barry Commoner	233,052
1980	Wretha Hanson (Note: Wretha Hanson appeared on a ballot line in Ohio in place of Barry Commoner's official running mate La Donna Harris.)	Citizens Party	Barry Commoner	8,564 (Note: The vote total is for the Commoner-Hanson ticket in Ohio only.)
1980	Angela Davis	Communist Party	Gus Hall	43,871
1980	Eileen Shearer	American Independent Party	John Rarick	41,268
1980	Matilde Zimmermann	Socialist Workers Party	Andrew Pulley (Note: Richard H. Congress or Clifton DeBerry were the Socialist Workers Party's presidential candidate in some states, but Zimmerman was on all three tickets as the vice presidential candidate.)	40,105
1980	Elizabeth Cervantes Barron	Peace and Freedom Party	Maureen Smith	18,106
1980	Gavrielle Holmes	Workers World Party	Deirdre Griswold	13,213
1980	Naomi Cohen	Workers World Party	Deirdre Griswold	3,790 (Note: The vote total is for the Griswold-Cohen ticket in Ohio only.)
1980	Diane Drufenbrock	Socialist Party	David McReynolds	6,898
1984	Geraldine Ferraro	Democratic Party	Walter Mondale	37,577,352
1984	Maureen Kennedy Salaman	Populist Party	Bob Richards	66,168
1984	Nancy Ross	New Alliance Party	Dennis L. Serrette	46,852
1984	Angela Davis	Communist Party	Gus Hall	36,386
1984	Andrea Gonzales (Note: Matilde Zimmerman was an alternate candidate for Andrea Gonzales in some states, including Ohio.)	Socialist Workers Party	Melvin T. Mason	24,672
1984	Matilde Zimmermann	Socialist Workers Party	Melvin T. Mason	
1984	Gloria La Riva	Workers World Party	Larry Holmes/Gavrielle Holmes	15,329
1984	Helen Halyard (Note: Edward Bergonzi was an alternate candidate for Helen Halyard in some states, including Ohio.)	Socialist Equality Party	Edward Winn	10,801
1984	Jean T. Brust	Socialist Equality Party	Edward Winn	
1984	Emma Wong Mar	Peace and Freedom Party	Sonia Johnson	
1988	Joyce Dattner (Note: Three male candidates were alternates for Dattner in three states, including California and Oregon.)	New Alliance Party	Lenora Fulani	143,858
1988	Mamie Moore (Note: Mamie Moore was an alternate candidate for Dattner in nine states, including Hawaii.)	New Alliance Party	Lenora Fulani	26,487
1988	Florence M. Rice	Consumer Party	Eugene McCarthy	25,109
1988	Joan Andrews	Right to Life Party	William A. Marra	20,504
1988	Helen Halyard	Socialist Equality Party	Edward Winn	18,693
1988	Kathleen Mickells	Socialist Workers Party	James "Mac" Warren	15,604
1988	Wynonia Burke (Note: Burke was an alternate candidate for Dattner in four states, including Alaska.)	New Alliance Party	Lenora Fulani	11,888
1988	Vikki Murdock	Peace and Freedom Party	Herbert G. Lewin	10,370
1988	Gloria La Riva	Workers World Party	Larry Holmes	7,846
1988	Alpha Sunde Smaby (Note: Smaby was on the ballot only in Minnesota.)	Minnesota Progressive Party	Eugene McCarthy	5,403
1988	Maureen Smith (Note: Smith was on the ballot as a write-in only in California.)	Peace and Freedom Party	Eugene McCarthy	243
1988	Emma Wong Mar	Peace and Freedom Party/Ind. Socialist	Herbert G. Lewin	219
1988	Debra Freeman	National Economic Recovery Party	Lyndon LaRouche	
1988	Susan Gardner	Independent	Eugene McCarthy	
1992	Nancy Lord	Libertarian Party	Andre Marrou	290,087
1992	Maria Elizabeth Muñoz	New Alliance Party	Lenora Fulani	73,714
1992	Asiba Tupahache	Peace and Freedom Party	Ronald Daniels	27,961
1992	Barbara Garson	Socialist Party	J. Quinn Brisben	3,057
1992	Willie Mae Reid	Socialist Workers Party	James "Mac" Warren	
1992	Estelle DeBates	Socialist Workers Party	James "Mac" Warren	
1992	Doris Feimer	The American Party	Robert J. Smith	292
1992	Joann Roland	Third Party	Eugene Arthur Hem	
1996	Winona LaDuke	Green Party	Ralph Nader	596,780 (Note: Excludes votes for Nader in Iowa, New York, and Vermont.)
1996	Muriel Tillinghast (Note: Muriel Tillinghast appeared on a ballot line in New York in place of Ralph Nader's official running mate Winona LaDuke.)	Green Party	Ralph Nader	75,956 (Note: Vote total for the Nader-Tillinghast ticket in New York only.)
1996	Anne Goeke (Note: Anne Goeke appeared on a ballot line in Iowa and Vermont in place of Ralph Nader's official running mate Winona LaDuke.)	Green Party	Ralph Nader	12,135 (Note: Vote total for the Nader-Goeke ticket in Iowa and Vermont only.)
1996	Jo Jorgensen	Libertarian Party	Harry Browne	485,798
1996	Kate McClatchy	Peace and Freedom Party	Marsha Feinland	25,332
1996	Rosemary Giumarra	Independent	Charles E. Collins	8,952
1996	Laura Garza	Socialist Workers Party	James Harris	8,476
1996	Rachel Bubar Kelly	Prohibition Party	Earl Dodge	1,298
1996	Connie Chandler	Independent Party of Utah	A. Peter Crane	1,101
1996	Shirley Jean Masters	Looking Back Party	Isabell Masters	752
1996	Anne Northrop	AIDS Cure Party	Steve Michael	408
2000	Winona LaDuke	Green Party	Ralph Nader	2,883,105
2000	Ezola B. Foster	Reform Party	Pat Buchanan	449,225
2000	Margaret Trowe	Socialist Workers Party	James Harris	7,378
2000	Mary Cal Hollis	Socialist Party	David McReynolds	5,602
2000	Gloria La Riva	Workers World Party	Monica Moorehead	4,795
2000	Sabrina R. Allen	Independent	Cathy Gordon Brown	1,606
2004	Pat LaMarche	Green Party	David Cobb	119,859
2004	Janice Jordan	Peace and Freedom Party	Leonard Peltier	27,607
2004	Mary Alice Herbert	Socialist Party	Walt Brown	10,837
2004	Margaret Trowe (Note: Margaret Trowe was an alternate for Arrin Hawkins.)	Socialist Workers Party	James Harris	7,102
2004	Arrin Hawkins	Socialist Workers Party	Róger Calero	3,689
2004	Karen Sanchirico (Note: Karen Sanchirico appeared on a ballot line in Montana in place of Ralph Nader's official running mate Peter Camejo.)	Independent	Ralph Nader	6,168 (Note: The vote total is for the Nader-Sanchirico ticket in Montana only.)
2004	Jennifer A. Ryan	Christian Freedom Party	Thomas J. Harens	2,387
2004	Teresa Gutierrez	Workers World Party	John Parker	1,646
2004	Marilyn Chambers	Personal Choice Party	Charles Jay	946
2004	Irene M. Deasy	Independent	Stanford Andress	804
2008	Sarah Palin	Republican Party	John McCain	59,948,323
2008	Rosa Clemente	Green Party	Cynthia McKinney	161,797
2008	Alyson Kennedy	Socialist Workers Party	Róger Calero	7,197
2008	Andrea Marie Psoras	Vote Here Party	Jeffrey H. Boss	604
2008	Patricia Rubacky	New American Independent Party	Frank McEnulty	(Note: Rubacky was McEnulty's running mate in New York, Vermont, New Hampshire, Massachusetts and Maine, though the party had no ballot access in any state except Colorado. McEnulty had nine other running mates.)
2012	Cheri Honkala	Green Party	Jill Stein	469,628
2012	Cindy Sheehan	Peace and Freedom Party	Roseanne Barr	67,326
2012	Maura DeLuca	Socialist Workers Party	James Harris	4,117
2012	Virginia Abernethy	American Third Position Party	Merlin Miller	2,701
2012	Phyllis Scherrer	Socialist Equality Party	Jerry White	1,279
2016	Mindy Finn	Independent	Evan McMullin	449,640
2016	Angela Nicole Walker	Socialist Party USA	Mimi Soltysik	2,540
2016	Hannah Walsh	United States Pacifist Party	Bradford Lyttle	334
2016	Kathleen Monahan	Independent	Lynn S. Kahn	5,610
2020	Dawn Neptune Adams	Oregon Progressive Party	Dario Hunter	5,403
2020	Karla Ballard	Independent	Brock Pierce	49,700
2020	Margaret Bayliss	Dirigo	M. D. Mitchell	
2020	Anne Beckett	Independent	Robert Morrow	
2020	Kendra Bryant	Republican Party (write-in)	Barbara Bellar	
2020	Sheila Cannon	Independent	Deborah Rouse	
2020	Dayna Chandler	Genealogy Know Your Family History	Ricki Sue King	
2020	Sherrie Dow	None (write-in)	Mary Ruth Caro Simmons	
2020	Veronica Ehrenreich	Independent	Ryan Ehrenreich	
2020	Susan C. Fletcher	Independent	Timothy A. Stevens	
2020	Kamala Harris	Democratic Party	Joe Biden	81,281,888
2020	Alyssa Howard	Independent	Shawn Howard	
2020	Taja Yvonne Iwanow	Independent American	Kyle Kopitke	
2020	Khadijah Jacob Sr.	Unaffiliated	Princess Khadijah Jacob-Fambro	
2020	Jennifer Jairala	Independent	Abram Loeb	
2020	Tiara Lusk	Life and Liberty Party	J. R. Myers	1,372 (Note: Vote total is for the Myers-Lusk ticket in Arkansas only.)
2020	Cynthia McKinney	Green Party of Alaska	Jesse Ventura	3,291
2020	Melissa Nixon	Independent	Jade Simmons	181 (Note: Vote total is for the Simmons-Nixon ticket in Florida only.)
2020	Liz Parrish	Transhumanist Party	Charlie Kam	
2020	Raechelle Pope	Independent	Michael Laboch	
2020	Darlene Raley	Republican Party (write-in)	Albert Raley	
2020	Claudeliah Roze	Independent	Jade Simmons	6,777
2020	Norissa Santa Cruz	Socialist Equality Party	Joseph Kishore	
2020	Karen M. Short	Democratic Party (write-in)	Sharon Wallace	
2020	Elizabeth Storm	Independent	Joe McHugh	2,843
2020	Jennifer Tepool	Unaffiliated	Jordan "Cancer" Scott	
2020	Michelle Tidball	Birthday Party	Kanye West	70,294
2020	Angela Nicole Walker	Green Party/Socialist Party USA	Howie Hawkins	404,021
2020	Rachel Wells	Independent	Kasey Wells	
2024	Melina Abdullah	Independent	Cornel West	
2024	Tanda BluBear	Green Party of Alaska	Jasmine Sherman	N/A
2024	Trisha Butler	Libertarian Party of New Mexico	Laura Ebke	
2024	Stephanie Cholensky	Socialist Party USA	Bill Stodden	
2024	Shannel Conner	Godliness, Truth, Justice Party	Mattie Preston	
2024	Andrea Denault	Approval Voting Party	Blake Huber	
2024	Crystal Ellis	Independent	Shiva Ayyadurai	
2024	Karina Garcia	Party for Socialism and Liberation	Claudia De la Cruz	
2024	Lauren Onak	American Solidarity Party	Peter Sonski	
2024	Nicole Shanahan (Note: Kennedy and Shanahan withdrew in August 2024 but remained on the ballot in 30 states and as write-in candidates in Pennsylvania.)	Independent	Robert F. Kennedy Jr.	756,393
Year	Name	Party	Running mate	Votes

==== Not nominated by party ====
Year	Name	Party	Details	Nomination winner
1848	Lucretia Mott	Liberty Party	5 of 84 votes	Charles C. Foote
1884	Clemence S. Lozier	Equal Rights Party	Declined nomination.	Marietta Stow
1924	Lena Springs	Democratic Party	several to 50 votes in national convention	Charles W. Bryan
1928	Nellie Tayloe Ross	Democratic Party	31 votes in national convention	Joseph T. Robinson
1952	India Edwards	Democratic Party		John Sparkman
1952	Sarah T. Hughes	Democratic Party		John Sparkman
1972	Shirley Chisholm	Democratic Party	20 votes in national convention	Thomas Eagleton
1972	Frances Farenthold	Democratic Party	405 votes in national convention	Thomas Eagleton
1972	Martha Griffiths	Democratic Party	1 vote in national convention	Thomas Eagleton
1972	Patricia Harris	Democratic Party	1 vote in national convention	Thomas Eagleton
1972	Eleanor McGovern	Democratic Party	1 vote in national convention	Thomas Eagleton
1972	Martha Mitchell	Democratic Party	1 vote in national convention	Thomas Eagleton
1972	Maggie Kuhn	People's Party	declined nomination	Benjamin Spock
1976	Anne Armstrong	Republican Party	subject of draft campaign; 6 votes in national convention	Bob Dole
1976	Barbara Jordan	Democratic Party	17 votes in national convention	Walter Mondale
1976	Nancy Palm	Republican Party	1 vote in national convention	Bob Dole
1984	Shirley Chisholm	Democratic Party	3 votes in national convention	Geraldine Ferraro
1984	Jeane J. Kirkpatrick	Republican Party	1 vote in primary	George H. W. Bush
1992	Susan K.Y. Shargal	Democratic Party	1,097 votes (2nd place) in New Hampshire primary	Al Gore
1992	Mary Ruwart	Libertarian Party	129 votes at convention (1st ballot); 64 votes at convention (2nd ballot)	Nancy Lord
2000	Gail Lightfoot	Libertarian Party	7 votes at convention (1st ballot; 6th place)	Art Olivier
2004	Tamara Millay	Libertarian Party	220 votes at convention (2nd place)	Richard Campagna
2008	Mary Alice Herbert	Socialist Party		Stewart Alexander
2012	Susan Gayle Ducey	Constitution Party	8 votes at convention (5th place)	Darrell Castle
2016	Alicia Dearn	Libertarian Party	29 votes at convention (5th place)	William Weld
2016	Carly Fiorina	Republican Party	Joined the ticket of Ted Cruz; suspended campaign six days later	Mike Pence
2020	Sorinne Ardeleanu	Libertarian Party	3 write-in votes at convention in 3 ballots (1 per ballot)	Spike Cohen
2020	Laura Ebke	Libertarian Party	1 write-in vote at convention (1st ballot)	Spike Cohen
2024	Elise Stefanik	Republican Party	Shortlisted for selection	JD Vance

== See also ==
- List of elected and appointed female heads of state and government
- List of female governors in the United States
- Edith Wilson (sometimes nicknamed "the first female president of the United States")
- Female president of the United States in popular culture
