= 1932 United States presidential election in Indiana =

- November 8, 1932
- Turnout: 78.9% ▲4.0 pp

Nominee	Franklin D. Roosevelt	Herbert Hoover
Party	Democratic	Republican
Home state	New York	California
Running mate	John Nance Garner	Charles Curtis
Electoral vote	14	0
Popular vote	862,054	677,184
Percentage	54.67%	42.94%
County results
Roosevelt
40–50%
50–60%
60–70%
70–80%
Hoover
40–50%
50–60%
President before election
Herbert Hoover
Republican
Elected President
Franklin D. Roosevelt
Democratic

A presidential election was held in Indiana on November 8, 1932, as part of the 1932 United States presidential election. The Democratic ticket of the governor of New York Franklin D. Roosevelt and the speaker of the United States House of Representatives John Nance Garner defeated the Republican ticket of the incumbent president of the United States Herbert Hoover and the vice president of the United States Charles Curtis. Roosevelt defeated Hoover in the national election with 472 electoral votes.

== General election ==
=== Statistics ===
Roosevelt became the only Democratic presidential candidate to carry Steuben County, Indiana. As of the 2024, this remains the most recent presidential election in which the Democratic ticket carried Fulton, Jasper, Kosciusko, Morgan and Newton counties.

=== Summary ===
Indiana chose 14 electors on a statewide general ticket. State law required voters to elect each member of the Electoral College individually, rather than as a group. This sometimes resulted in small differences in the number of votes cast for electors pledged to the same presidential candidate, if some voters did not vote for all the electors nominated by a party. The following table quotes the official returns published by the secretary of state of Indiana, which list the votes for the first elector on each ticket.

1932 United States presidential election in Indiana
Party	Candidate	Votes	%	±%
Democratic	Franklin D. Roosevelt John Nance Garner	862,054	54.67	▲15.08
Republican	Herbert Hoover Charles Curtis	677,184	42.94	▼16.74
Socialist	Norman Thomas James H. Maurer	21,388	1.36	▲1.09
Prohibition	William D. Upshaw Frank S. Regan	10,399	0.66	▲0.27
Communist	William Z. Foster James W. Ford	2,187	0.14	▲0.12
Socialist Labor	Verne L. Reynolds John W. Aiken	2,070	0.13	▲0.08
National	John Zahnd (Note: Replacing George I. Wilson.) Florence Garvin	1,615	0.10	▲0.10
Total votes		1,576,927	100.00	

=== Results ===
1932 United States presidential election in Indiana
Ticket	Electors for Candidate	Votes
Democratic	John W. Spencer	862,054
Democratic	LeRoy J. Keach	854,024
Democratic	Sol Henoch	853,880
Democratic	Ned Phelps	853,316
Democratic	Charles W. Anglin	853,182
Democratic	Edward Logan	853,123
Democratic	John Gubbins	853,030
Democratic	Ernest R. Stewart	853,013
Democratic	Frank Finney	852,937
Democratic	Evans Woollen	852,845
Democratic	Herbert Leffel	852,777
Democratic	Albert P. Lesniak	852,739
Democratic	Ethel Cummings	852,576
Democratic	Albert Gisler	852,516
Republican	Oscar George Foellinger	677,184
Republican	Benjamin Franklin Huffman	673,453
Republican	Horace Singer Norton	672,014
Republican	Christian Christensen	671,877
Republican	James R. Spivey	671,712
Republican	George Freese	671,541
Republican	Claud H. Stratton	671,527
Republican	E. Vernon Knight	671,509
Republican	Phillip Warrington McAbee	671,509
Republican	James Lindley Tucker	671,343
Republican	Robert H. Carpenter	671,325
Republican	Elza O. Rogers	671,258
Republican	Maude Irene Briles	671,231
Republican	William D. Bain	671,022
Socialist	Arlington L. Binford	21,388
Socialist	Manuel C. Turpin	20,930
Socialist	Joseph Gray	20,780
Socialist	Frank Barker	20,753
Socialist	Edward G. Nix	20,745
Socialist	Joseph E. Showalter	20,745
Socialist	Louis Freedman	20,739
Socialist	Michael Hasenstab	20,732
Socialist	Jacob E. Schrader	20,732
Socialist	Charles Stastney	20,731
Socialist	Joseph M. Coffman	20,723
Socialist	Chester Y. Edkins	20,702
Socialist	John H. Wilson	20,683
Socialist	William H. Tice	20,624
Prohibition	Basil L. Allen	10,399
Prohibition	Henry S. Bonsib	9,847
Prohibition	Luella Swisher	9,724
Prohibition	John Skedler	9,708
Prohibition	A. Lee Hanson	9,690
Prohibition	Allen Bowman	9,687
Prohibition	Walter Ward	9,685
Prohibition	John E. Thompson	9,671
Prohibition	Thomas F. White	9,662
Prohibition	Julia M. Nance	9,660
Prohibition	Thomas R. Woodard	9,660
Prohibition	Lucy Green	9,655
Prohibition	Curtis B. Hardesty	9,653
Prohibition	Albert Stanley	9,647
Communist	John Babrick	2,187
Communist	Arthur Osborn	2,157
Communist	Samuel Luther	2,155
Communist	Leo Vancuren	2,152
Communist	Floyd McCoy	2,151
Communist	Clarence Strange	2,151
Communist	Zilba A. Shook	2,150
Communist	Garfield Mimms	2,148
Communist	James N. Swain	2,148
Communist	James H. Snider	2,145
Communist	Sam Langford	2,144
Communist	Joseph Chelich	2,143
Communist	James E. Ewing	2,143
Communist	David Howell	2,138
Socialist Labor	Charles Ginsberg	2,070
Socialist Labor	William P. Harnishfeger	1,982
Socialist Labor	Stanko Jukich	1,966
Socialist Labor	Orville Laughlin	1,966
Socialist Labor	Ivan Nelson Ballinger	1,956
Socialist Labor	Earl A. McCracken	1,915
National	Ivan Richards	1,645
National	Elizabeth Decker	1,644
National	Kenneth E. Friend	1,644
National	Lawrence Hammill	1,643
National	Joe F. Green	1,642
National	Charles L. Baxter	1,641
National	Gilbert A. Dingman	1,639
National	Charles A. Minor	1,637
National	Charles Underwood	1,636
National	Anna Ahlborn	1,635
National	Henry O. Shaw	1,635
National	Charles H. McManama	1,627
National	Chauncey B. Reddick	1,621
National	Henry J. Zahnd	1,615
Total votes		≈1,576,927

=== Results by county ===
County	Franklin D. Roosevelt Democratic		Herbert Hoover Republican		Norman Thomas Socialist		Others		Margin		Total
County	Votes	%	Votes	%	Votes	%	Votes	%	Votes	%	Total
Adams	5,892	66.11%	2,910	32.65%	0	0.00%	111	1.25%	2,982	33.46%	8,913
Allen	38,447	57.76%	27,065	40.66%	463	0.70%	587	0.88%	11,382	17.10%	66,562
Bartholomew	7,533	54.05%	6,015	43.16%	270	1.94%	120	0.86%	1,518	10.89%	13,938
Benton	3,496	58.43%	2,433	40.67%	17	0.28%	37	0.62%	1,063	17.77%	5,983
Blackford	4,088	57.34%	2,890	40.53%	45	0.63%	107	1.50%	1,198	16.80%	7,130
Boone	6,900	55.47%	5,309	42.68%	121	0.97%	110	0.88%	1,591	12.79%	12,440
Brown	1,676	66.32%	790	31.26%	32	1.27%	29	1.15%	886	35.06%	2,527
Carroll	4,866	55.30%	3,853	43.79%	15	0.17%	65	0.74%	1,013	11.51%	8,799
Cass	10,987	57.08%	7,980	41.46%	137	0.71%	144	0.75%	3,007	15.62%	19,248
Clark	9,501	61.21%	5,881	37.89%	81	0.52%	59	0.38%	3,620	23.32%	15,522
Clay	8,151	58.99%	5,343	38.67%	190	1.38%	134	0.97%	2,808	20.32%	13,818
Clinton	8,314	56.27%	6,288	42.56%	44	0.30%	130	0.88%	2,026	13.71%	14,776
Crawford	3,272	59.19%	2,175	39.35%	22	0.40%	59	1.07%	1,097	19.84%	5,528
Daviess	6,772	52.54%	5,838	45.29%	168	1.30%	111	0.86%	934	7.25%	12,889
Dearborn	6,429	57.02%	4,716	41.83%	92	0.82%	38	0.34%	1,713	15.19%	11,275
Decatur	5,437	53.31%	4,646	45.56%	37	0.36%	78	0.76%	791	7.76%	10,198
DeKalb	7,235	55.74%	5,590	43.06%	61	0.47%	95	0.73%	1,645	12.67%	12,981
Delaware	14,346	45.91%	16,012	51.25%	583	1.87%	304	0.97%	-1,666	-5.33%	31,245
Dubois	7,547	75.50%	2,357	23.58%	73	0.73%	19	0.19%	5,190	51.92%	9,996
Elkhart	14,885	50.34%	13,826	46.76%	501	1.69%	354	1.20%	1,059	3.58%	29,566
Fayette	5,148	50.70%	4,867	47.93%	86	0.85%	53	0.52%	281	2.77%	10,154
Floyd	10,497	57.83%	7,333	40.40%	210	1.16%	113	0.62%	3,164	17.43%	18,153
Fountain	5,665	56.93%	4,162	41.83%	65	0.65%	58	0.58%	1,503	15.11%	9,950
Franklin	4,704	63.06%	2,687	36.02%	27	0.36%	41	0.55%	2,017	27.04%	7,459
Fulton	4,794	54.96%	3,787	43.42%	42	0.48%	99	1.14%	1,007	11.55%	8,722
Gibson	9,162	57.76%	6,237	39.32%	167	1.05%	297	1.87%	2,925	18.44%	15,863
Grant	13,390	51.58%	11,398	43.90%	735	2.83%	438	1.69%	1,992	7.67%	25,961
Greene	8,845	55.51%	6,397	40.15%	514	3.23%	177	1.11%	2,448	15.36%	15,933
Hamilton	5,999	44.85%	7,100	53.08%	96	0.72%	181	1.35%	-1,101	-8.23%	13,376
Hancock	5,836	57.89%	4,055	40.22%	52	0.52%	138	1.37%	1,781	17.67%	10,081
Harrison	5,128	58.25%	3,553	40.36%	21	0.24%	102	1.16%	1,575	17.89%	8,804
Hendricks	5,293	48.93%	5,317	49.15%	99	0.92%	108	1.00%	-24	-0.22%	10,817
Henry	8,255	47.66%	8,430	48.67%	225	1.30%	409	2.36%	-175	-1.01%	17,319
Howard	10,541	50.81%	9,257	44.62%	607	2.93%	339	1.63%	1,284	6.19%	20,744
Huntington	8,697	54.97%	6,791	42.92%	133	0.84%	200	1.26%	1,906	12.05%	15,821
Jackson	7,882	65.22%	3,996	33.06%	114	0.94%	94	0.78%	3,886	32.15%	12,086
Jasper	3,538	54.40%	2,897	44.54%	21	0.32%	48	0.74%	641	9.86%	6,504
Jay	6,693	57.15%	5,018	42.85%	0	0.00%	0	0.00%	1,675	14.30%	11,711
Jefferson	5,305	52.19%	4,670	45.95%	72	0.71%	117	1.15%	635	6.25%	10,164
Jennings	3,603	53.64%	3,020	44.96%	40	0.60%	54	0.80%	583	8.68%	6,717
Johnson	6,940	59.23%	4,593	39.20%	86	0.73%	99	0.84%	2,347	20.03%	11,718
Knox	14,084	66.62%	6,590	31.17%	240	1.14%	226	1.07%	7,494	35.45%	21,140
Kosciusko	7,475	50.54%	7,063	47.75%	85	0.57%	168	1.14%	412	2.79%	14,791
LaGrange	3,261	56.03%	2,461	42.29%	21	0.36%	77	1.32%	800	13.75%	5,820
Lake	46,060	50.34%	42,596	46.56%	1,474	1.61%	1,362	1.49%	3,464	3.79%	91,492
LaPorte	14,890	57.28%	10,739	41.31%	242	0.93%	124	0.48%	4,151	15.97%	25,995
Lawrence	8,215	49.07%	8,314	49.66%	121	0.72%	91	0.54%	-99	-0.59%	16,741
Madison	22,069	52.72%	18,803	44.92%	600	1.43%	388	0.93%	3,266	7.80%	41,860
Marion	106,661	50.15%	98,256	46.20%	5,325	2.50%	2,422	1.14%	8,405	3.95%	212,664
Marshall	7,212	58.13%	4,943	39.84%	87	0.70%	165	1.33%	2,269	18.29%	12,407
Martin	3,072	58.79%	2,106	40.31%	14	0.27%	33	0.63%	966	18.49%	5,225
Miami	8,892	58.53%	5,987	39.41%	89	0.59%	223	1.47%	2,905	19.12%	15,191
Monroe	8,478	51.39%	7,759	47.03%	169	1.02%	91	0.55%	719	4.36%	16,497
Montgomery	8,077	54.93%	6,417	43.64%	80	0.54%	130	0.88%	1,660	11.29%	14,704
Morgan	5,775	53.50%	4,825	44.70%	98	0.91%	97	0.90%	950	8.80%	10,795
Newton	2,654	52.02%	2,380	46.65%	32	0.63%	36	0.71%	274	5.37%	5,102
Noble	6,538	54.63%	5,304	44.32%	55	0.46%	71	0.59%	1,234	10.31%	11,968
Ohio	1,288	55.88%	997	43.25%	6	0.26%	14	0.61%	291	12.62%	2,305
Orange	4,844	51.06%	4,561	48.08%	34	0.36%	48	0.51%	283	2.98%	9,487
Owen	3,639	58.35%	2,423	38.86%	108	1.73%	66	1.06%	1,216	19.50%	6,236
Parke	4,703	53.06%	3,926	44.29%	146	1.65%	89	1.00%	777	8.77%	8,864
Perry	5,053	60.46%	3,253	38.93%	33	0.39%	18	0.22%	1,800	21.54%	8,357
Pike	4,547	57.33%	3,193	40.26%	85	1.07%	106	1.34%	1,354	17.07%	7,931
Porter	5,542	48.69%	5,631	49.47%	157	1.38%	52	0.46%	-89	-0.78%	11,382
Posey	5,641	65.26%	2,876	33.27%	55	0.64%	72	0.83%	2,765	31.99%	8,644
Pulaski	3,286	58.25%	2,226	39.46%	20	0.35%	109	1.93%	1,060	18.79%	5,641
Putnam	6,168	56.24%	4,438	40.46%	276	2.52%	86	0.78%	1,730	15.77%	10,968
Randolph	6,223	47.27%	6,509	49.44%	73	0.55%	361	2.74%	-286	-2.17%	13,166
Ripley	5,987	57.86%	4,240	40.97%	57	0.55%	64	0.62%	1,747	16.88%	10,348
Rush	5,056	49.14%	5,094	49.50%	37	0.36%	103	1.00%	-38	-0.37%	10,290
St. Joseph	38,026	55.46%	28,198	41.13%	1,798	2.62%	541	0.79%	9,828	14.33%	68,563
Scott	2,240	55.89%	1,722	42.96%	14	0.35%	32	0.80%	518	12.92%	4,008
Shelby	8,552	60.14%	5,410	38.05%	79	0.56%	178	1.25%	3,142	22.10%	14,219
Spencer	5,422	57.06%	4,014	42.24%	17	0.18%	50	0.53%	1,408	14.82%	9,503
Starke	3,420	56.91%	2,449	40.75%	75	1.25%	66	1.10%	971	16.16%	6,010
Steuben	3,717	50.04%	3,594	48.38%	37	0.50%	80	1.08%	123	1.66%	7,428
Sullivan	7,835	62.80%	3,667	29.39%	789	6.32%	186	1.49%	4,168	33.41%	12,477
Switzerland	2,981	59.21%	1,953	38.79%	28	0.56%	73	1.45%	1,028	20.42%	5,035
Tippecanoe	13,609	53.03%	11,818	46.05%	143	0.56%	93	0.36%	1,791	6.98%	25,663
Tipton	4,898	56.15%	3,680	42.19%	63	0.72%	82	0.94%	1,218	13.96%	8,723
Union	1,587	48.25%	1,658	50.41%	19	0.58%	25	0.76%	-71	-2.16%	3,289
Vanderburgh	31,828	63.97%	16,873	33.91%	748	1.50%	303	0.61%	14,955	30.06%	49,752
Vermillion	6,390	58.77%	4,115	37.85%	235	2.16%	132	1.21%	2,275	20.93%	10,872
Vigo	25,886	57.29%	18,310	40.52%	557	1.23%	434	0.96%	7,576	16.77%	45,187
Wabash	6,553	48.63%	6,652	49.36%	81	0.60%	190	1.41%	-99	-0.73%	13,476
Warren	2,256	49.65%	2,223	48.92%	22	0.48%	43	0.95%	33	0.73%	4,544
Warrick	5,409	59.53%	3,429	37.74%	67	0.74%	181	1.99%	1,980	21.79%	9,086
Washington	4,809	58.78%	3,316	40.53%	24	0.29%	32	0.39%	1,493	18.25%	8,181
Wayne	13,287	50.13%	12,683	47.85%	275	1.04%	261	0.98%	604	2.28%	26,506
Wells	6,236	65.45%	3,073	32.25%	37	0.39%	182	1.91%	3,163	33.20%	9,528
White	4,976	57.91%	3,484	40.55%	65	0.76%	67	0.78%	1,492	17.36%	8,592
Whitley	5,058	57.13%	3,471	39.21%	32	0.36%	292	3.30%	1,587	17.93%	8,853
TOTAL	862,054	54.67%	677,184	42.94%	21,388	1.36%	16,301	1.03%	184,870	11.72%	1,576,927

==== Counties that flipped from Republican to Democratic ====
- Allen
- Bartholomew
- Benton
- Blackford
- Boone
- Carroll
- Cass
- Clark
- Clay
- Clinton
- Crawford
- Daviess
- Dearborn
- Decatur
- DeKalb
- Elkhart
- Fayette
- Floyd
- Fountain
- Fulton
- Gibson
- Grant
- Greene
- Hancock
- Harrison
- Henry
- Howard
- Huntington
- Jackson
- Jasper
- Jay
- Jefferson
- Jennings
- Johnson
- Knox
- Kosciusko
- LaGrange
- Lake
- LaPorte
- Lawrence
- Madison
- Marion
- Marshall
- Martin
- Martin
- Miami
- Monroe
- Montgomery
- Morgan
- Newton
- Noble
- Ohio
- Orange
- Owen
- Parke
- Pike
- Posey
- Pulaski
- Putnam
- Ripley
- Rush
- Scott
- Shelby
- Spencer
- St. Joseph
- Starke
- Steuben
- Sullivan
- Switerzland
- Tippecanoe
- Tipton
- Union
- Vanderburgh
- Vermillion
- Vigo
- Warren
- Warrick
- Washington
- Wayne
- White
- Whitley

== See also ==
- United States presidential elections in Indiana

== Bibliography ==
- Gause, Fred C.; Spencer, William W., eds. (1928). Election Law of Indiana with Instructions to Voters and Election Officers. Fort Wayne: State Board of Election Commissioners.
- Indiana (1933). Year Book of the State of Indiana for the Year 1932. Indianapolis: Legislative Bureau.
- Madison, James H. (1986). The Indiana Way: A State History. Bloomington: Indiana University Press.
- Menendez, Albert J. (2009). The Geography of Presidential Elections in the United States, 1868–2004. Jefferson, NC: McFarland and Company.
- Petersen, Svend (1963). A Statistical History of the American Presidential Elections. New York: Frederick Ungar Publishing Company. LCCN 62-21786.
- Sullivan, Robert David (June 29, 2016). "How the Red and Blue Map Evolved over the Past Century". America.
