= Nellie Mathes Horne =

American painter

Nellie Mathes Horne (May 26, 1870 – May 26, 1950) was an American painter.

Born in Eliot, Maine, Horne was the daughter of John Harrison and Lizzie N. (Young) Mathes. She was educated in the local public schools and those of Portsmouth, New Hampshire before graduating from the Commercial College in Boston. She also had lessons with Ulysses Dow Tenney, with whom she collaborated on a number of works. She moved to Washington, D.C. sometime around 1900 and opened a studio at The Dewey. During her career she painted portraits of many notables, among them Edward Everett Hale, William Dean Howells, John D. Long and Frank Jones; she also painted portraits of at least ten mayors of Portsmouth. A portrait by Horne of Belva Ann Lockwood is currently owned by the National Portrait Gallery, while the portrait of Frank Jones is currently in the collection of the Portsmouth Athenæum. The Naval Historical Center owns a portrait of David Henshaw ascribed to Ulysses Dow in whose creation she may have assisted. Horne lived in Portsmouth for a number of years; in that city, on August 5, 1891, she married William H. Horne. She also had a studio in Boston for some time. Horne moved to Los Angeles in 1920 and died there; she is buried in Forest Lawn Memorial Park in Glendale, California.
