= Agnes Waters =

Mothers' movement activist (1893–1962)

- Born: Agnes Murphy Mulligan; July 1, 1893
- Died: May 9, 1962 (aged 68)
- Occupations: Real estate, lecturer, activist

Agnes Waters (born Agnes Murphy Mulligan on July 1, 1893; died May 9, 1962) was a real estate person and member of the Mothers' movement who has been called "the most inflammatory lecturer on the Mothers' circuit in the 1930s and 1940s." Although she had initially deemed herself "liberal", and worked with National Woman's Party for women's suffrage, she is better known for her later strongly antisemitic and white nationalist positions. She embraced the antisemitic forgery The Protocols of the Elders of Zion and claimed mainline Christianity was "controlled by Jews and blacks." She also stated a hostility to what she termed "the invasion of the Asiatic races" and felt the Chinese should stay in China. She ran for President in 1948.
