= Alfred H. Love =

American political activist (1830–1913)

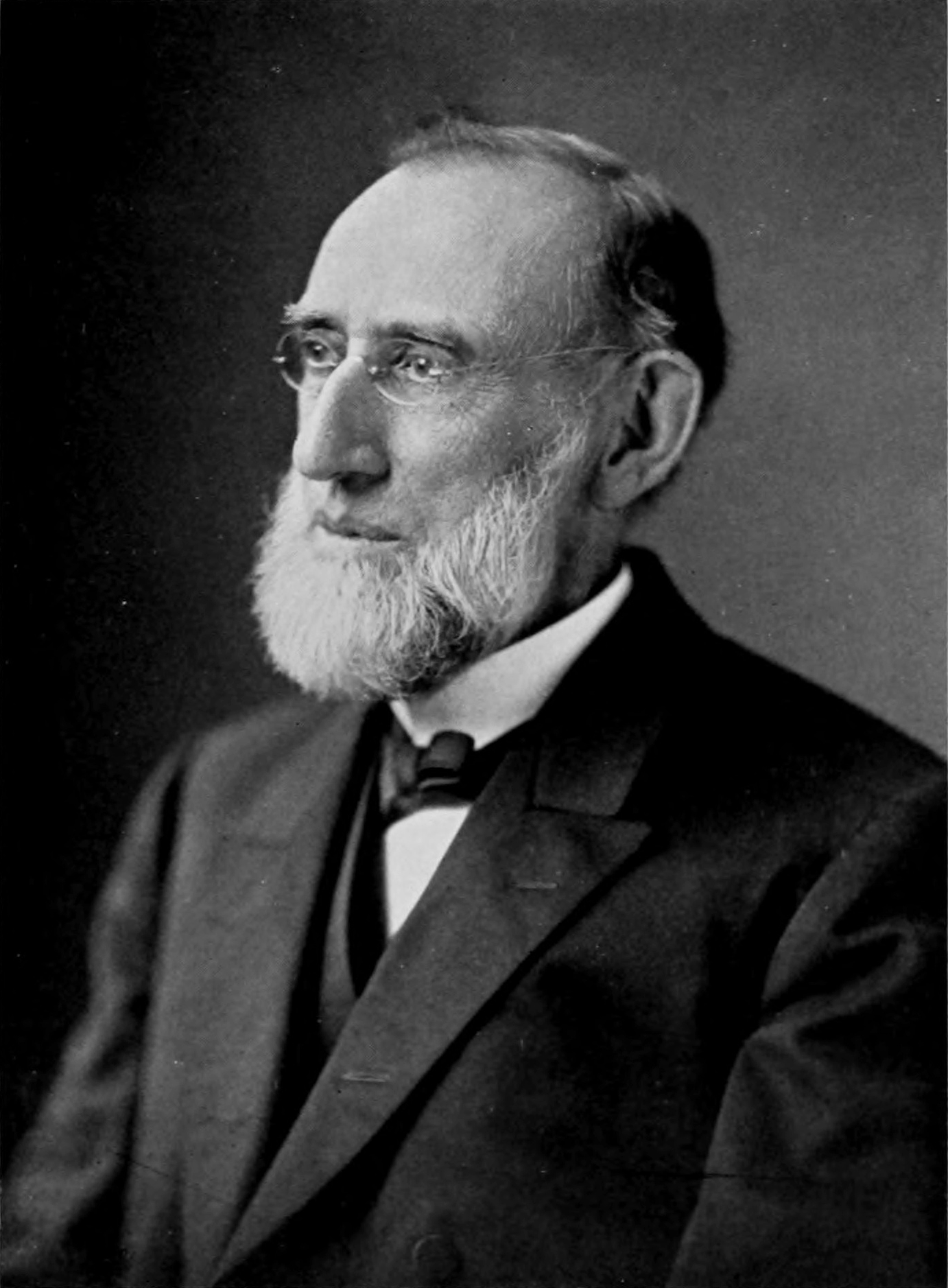
- Born: Alfred Henry Love; September 7, 1830; Philadelphia, Pennsylvania
- Died: June 29, 1913 (aged 82); Philadelphia, Pennsylvania
- Occupation: Politician
- Political party: National Equal Rights Party
- Spouse: Susan Henry Brown (m. 1853)

Alfred Henry Love (September 7, 1830 – June 29, 1913) of Philadelphia, Pennsylvania, was an American political activist.

== Biography ==
Love was born on September 7, 1830, to William H. Love and Rachel Evans. He married Susan Henry Brown in Burlington, New Jersey, on January 13, 1853.

He founded the Universal Peace Union in Providence, Rhode Island, in 1866 and served as its president until his death. In the 1888 U.S. presidential election, he was the vice presidential nominee of the National Equal Rights Party as the running mate of Belva Ann Lockwood. Love withdrew before the election and was replaced by Charles Stuart Wells.

Among his activities, Love tried to support gaining justice for American Indian tribes in the West, who were being forced off traditional lands onto reservations, often located hundreds of miles distant from their old territories. In 1875, he met with Alfred B. Meacham, a member of the peace commission to end the Modoc War, and members of the Modoc people, including Toby Riddle and Frank Riddle, who were on a national lecture tour.

In 1906, Love was nominated for a Nobel Peace Prize by eight United States senators and Hannis Taylor. He also was nominated in 1903 by Andrew Palm and in 1904 by Edvard Wavrinsky.

He died on June 29, 1913, in Philadelphia, Pennsylvania.

== Bibliography ==
- An Appeal In Vindication Of Peace Principles (1862)
