= Maureen Smith =

American politician

- Occupation: Politician
- Political party: Peace and Freedom
- Spouse: Michael J. Smith

Maureen Smith was a third-party candidate for President of the United States in the 1980 presidential election. She represented the Peace and Freedom Party and her running mate was Elizabeth Cervantes Barron. She also served as the chair of the party from 1978 to 1980, 86–88, 90–92. She was also Santa Cruz County chair of the party.

Smith was a write-in running mate of former Democratic U.S. Senator from Minnesota Eugene McCarthy during his unsuccessful 1988 campaign, where she and McCarthy were on the ballot only in California and got 243 votes.

== Family ==
Maureen is married to Michael J. Smith.

== Efforts ==
Since 2003, Maureen and her husband Mike have worked to ensure that electronic voting machines are required to provide a "paper trail" to verify authentication.

Preceded by Margaret Wright (People's Party)	Peace and Freedom nominee for President of the United States; 1980	Succeeded by Sonia Johnson (Citizens Party)
