= Belva Ann Lockwood =

American suffragette (1830–1917)

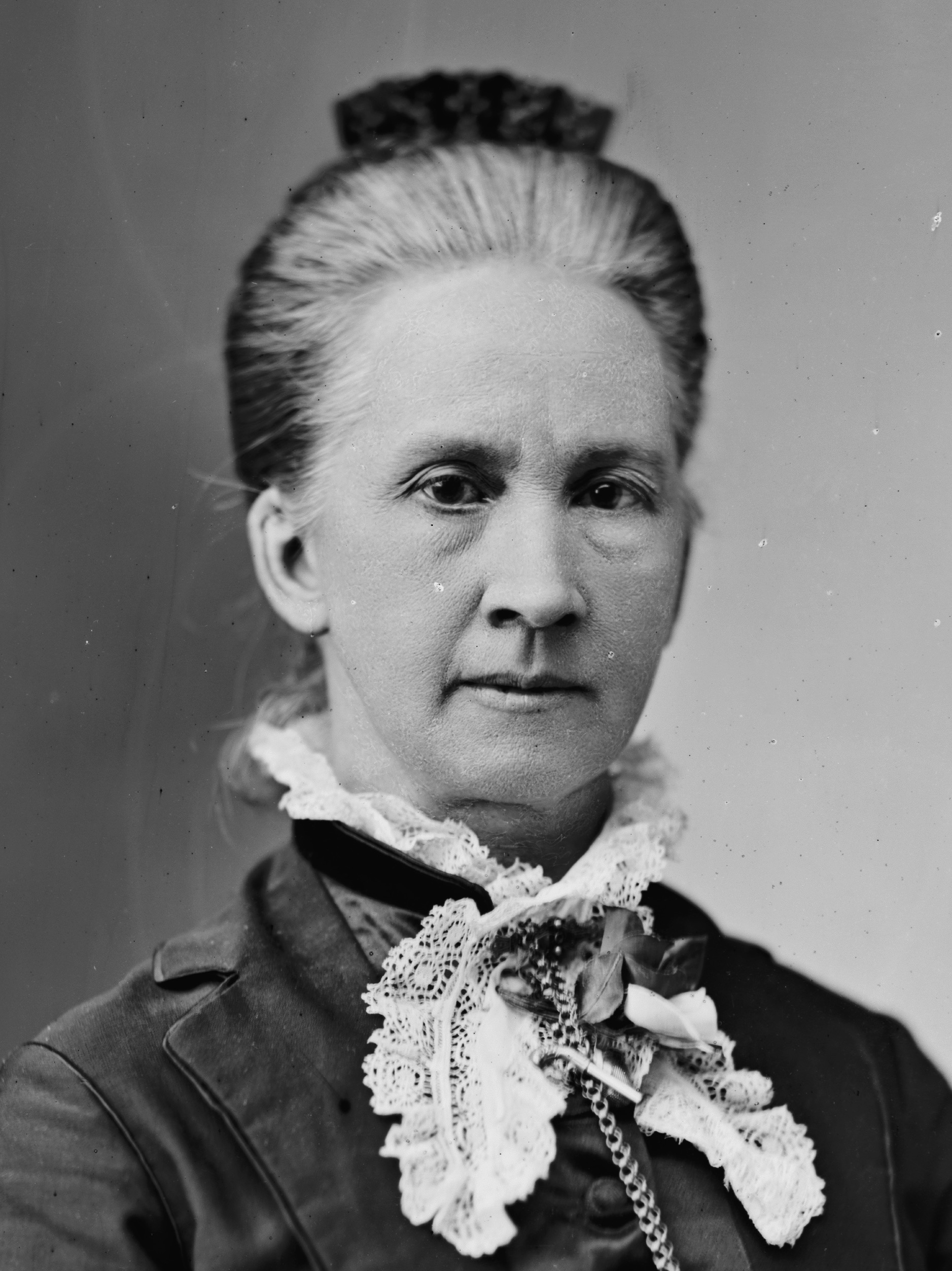
- Lockwood, 1865–1880
- Born: Belva Ann Bennett; October 24, 1830; Royalton, New York, U.S.
- Died: May 19, 1917 (aged 86); Washington, D.C., U.S.
- Education: Genesee Wesleyan Seminary; Genesee College (BA); Syracuse University (MA); National University (LLB)
- Occupations: attorney, politician, presidential candidate, activist
- Political party: Equal Rights
- Spouses: Uriah McNall (m. 1848; died 1853) Ezekiel Lockwood (m. 1868; died 1877)
- Children: 2

Belva Ann Bennett Lockwood (October 24, 1830 – May 19, 1917) was an American lawyer, politician, educator, and author who was active in the women's rights and women's suffrage movements. She was one of the first women lawyers in the United States. In 1879, she became the first woman to be admitted to practice law before the U.S. Supreme Court. Lockwood ran for president in 1884 and 1888 on the ticket of the Equal Rights Party and was the first woman to appear on official ballots. While Victoria Woodhull is commonly cited as the first woman to run for president, Lockwood was the first one to appear on any ballots, due to Woodhull being too young for the presidency when she ran.

Due to gender restrictions, Lockwood overcame many social and personal obstacles. Early on in life, Lockwood was a teacher and school principal, working to equalize pay for women in education. She supported the movement for world peace and was a proponent of the temperance movement.

== Early and personal life ==
Belva Ann Bennett was born in Royalton, New York, daughter of Lewis Johnson Bennett, a farmer, and his wife, Hannah Green. Bennett spent some of her childhood at her aunt's house, which still stands at 5070 Griswold Street. In front of the house is a memorial to her with a plaque that gives a brief biography of her life. By age 14, she was teaching at the local elementary school. In 1848, by age 18, she married Uriah McNall, a farmer local to the area.

McNall died of tuberculosis in 1853, three years after their daughter Lura was born.

== Education ==
Lockwood realized she needed a better education to support herself and her daughter. In 1854, she enrolled at Genesee Wesleyan Seminary, in Lima, NY, to prepare for college. Her plan, as she explained to Lippincott's Monthly Magazine, was not well received by many of her friends and colleagues, since most women did not seek higher education, and it was especially unusual for a widow to do so. After one semester at the seminary, she persuaded the administration at Genesee College, also in Lima, to admit her.

It was during her studies at Genesee College that Lockwood first became attracted to the law, although the school had no law department. Since a local law professor was offering private classes, she became one of his students. It made her want to learn more. Belva Lockwood graduated with honors from Genesee College in June 1857.

== Early career ==
Lockwood graduated with honors in 1857 and soon became the headmistress of Lockport Union School. It was a responsible position, but Lockwood found that whether she was teaching or working as an administrator, she was paid half of what her male counterparts were making.

For the next few years, Lockwood continued to teach and worked as the principal at several local schools for young women. She stayed at Lockport until 1861, then became principal of the Gainesville Female Seminary. In 1863, Lockwood bought the Owego Female Seminary, where she was principal before leaving to pursue her political career. This building was dismantled and moved, before being renovated in 2019 as the Belva Lockwood Inn in Owego, NY. Lockwood's educational philosophy was gradually changing, particularly after she met women's rights activist Susan B. Anthony. Lockwood agreed with many of Anthony's ideas about society's restrictions on women. Anthony was concerned about the limited education girls received. Courses at most girls' schools chiefly prepared female students for domestic life and possibly for temporary work as teachers. Anthony spoke about how young women ought to be given more options, including preparation for careers in the business world, where the pay was better. Lockwood was encouraged to make changes at her schools. She expanded the curriculum and added courses typical of those which young men took, such as public speaking, botany, and gymnastics.

Photograph of Belva Lockwood (1866)

Lockwood gradually determined to study law, instead of continuing teaching, and to leave upstate New York.

In February 1866, Belva Lockwood and her daughter Lura moved to Washington, D.C., as Lockwood believed it was the center of power in the United States and would provide good opportunities to advance in the legal profession. She opened a coeducational private school while exploring the study of law. In the mid-1860s, coeducation was unusual, and most schools were separated by gender.

== Second marriage ==
In 1868, Belva remarried, this time to a man much older than she. Reverend Ezekiel Lockwood, an American Civil War veteran, was a Baptist minister and practicing dentist. They had a daughter, Jessie, who died before her second birthday. Lockwood supported his wife's desire for legal study as well as encouraged her to pursue subjects that interested her. She earned a Master of Arts from Syracuse University in 1871. Not only did Rev. Lockwood have progressive ideas about women's roles in society, but he also helped raise Belva's daughter from her first marriage, Lura McNall. Ezekiel Lockwood died in late April 1877. In July 1879, Lockwood's daughter Lura McNall married DeForest Orme, a pharmacist.

== Legal education ==
According to Lockwood's later account to the Chicago Tribune, about 1870, she applied to the Columbian Law School in the District of Columbia. The trustees refused to admit her, fearing she would distract the male students. She and several other women were finally admitted to the new National University School of Law (now the George Washington University Law School). Although she completed her coursework in May 1873, the law school refused to grant her a diploma because of her gender.

Without a diploma, Lockwood could not gain admittance to the District of Columbia Bar. After a year, she wrote a letter to the President of the United States, Ulysses S. Grant, appealing to him as president ex officio of the National University Law School. She asked him for justice, stating she had passed all her courses and deserved to be awarded a diploma. In September 1873, within a week of having sent the letter, Lockwood received her Bachelor of Laws. She was 43 years old.

== Law practice ==
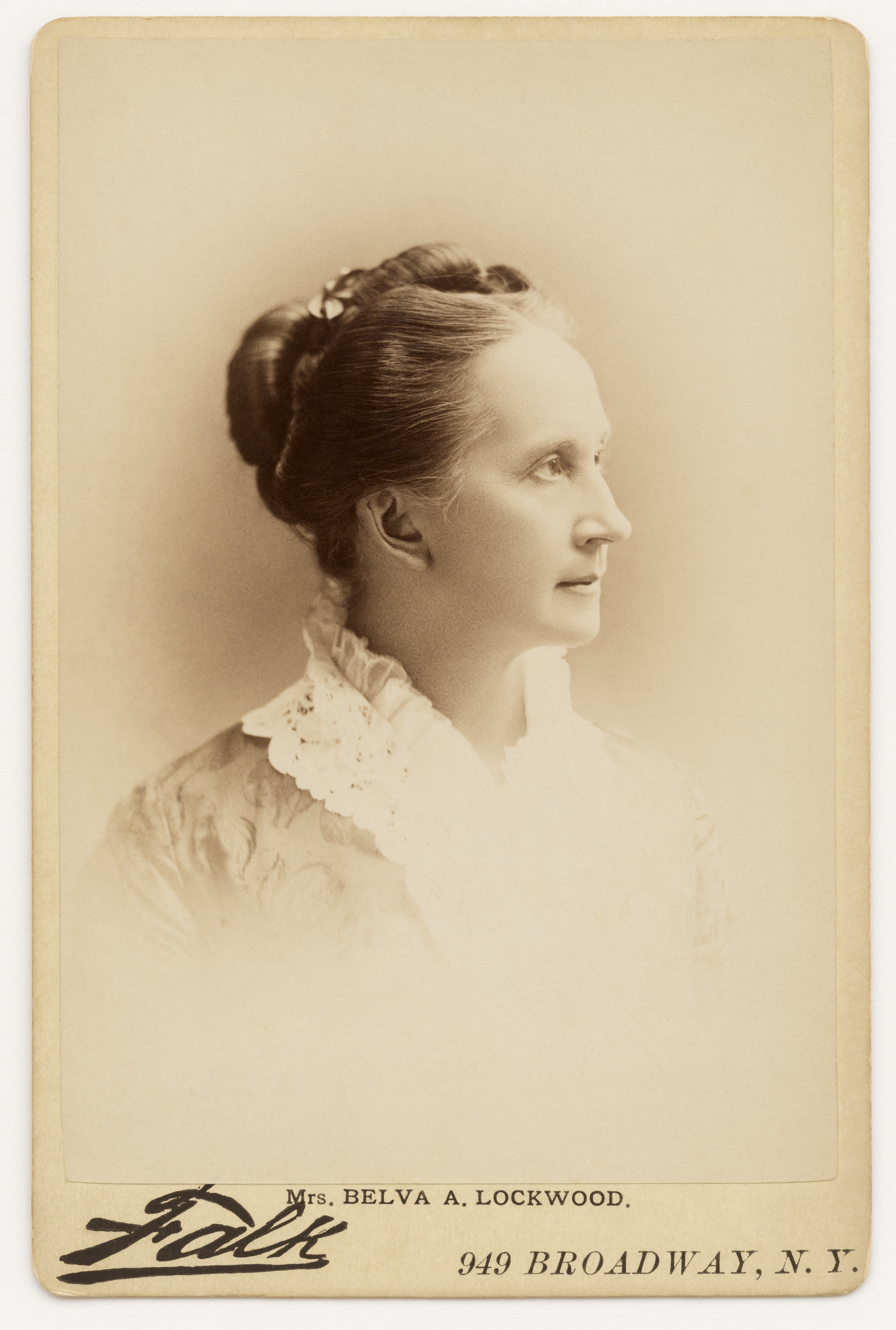
Belva Ann Bennett Lockwood, c. 1880

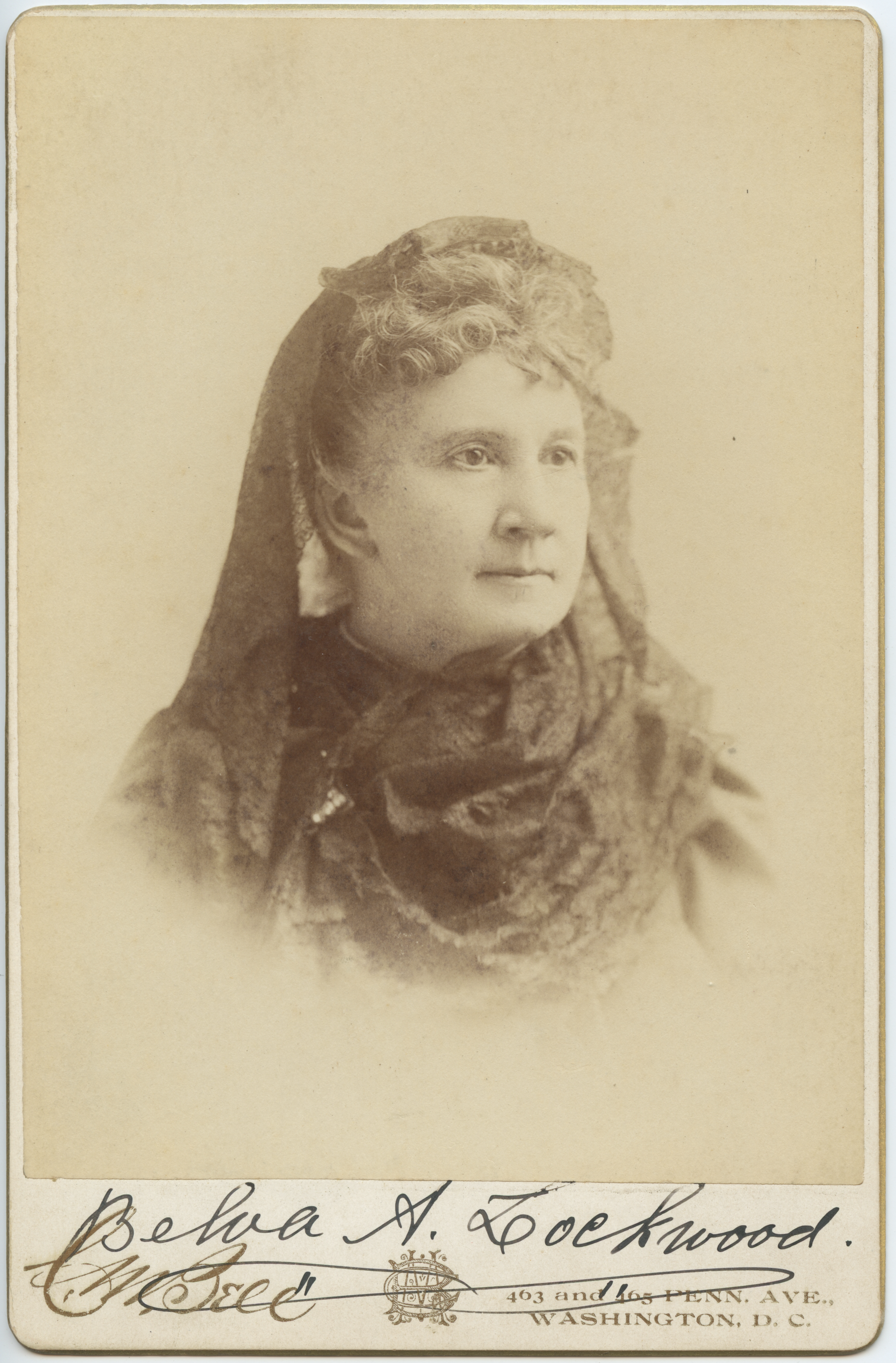
Signed photograph of Belva Ann Lockwood

The District of Columbia Bar admitted her, although several judges told Lockwood they had no confidence in her, a reaction she repeatedly had to overcome. When she tried to gain admission to the Maryland Bar, a judge lectured her and told her that God Himself had determined that women were not equal to men and never could be. When she tried to respond on her own behalf, he said she had no right to speak and had her removed from the courtroom. She also applied to the Court of Claims to represent veterans and their families, but was denied. She applied to the United States Supreme Court bar after having practiced for the minimum three years and secured Albert G. Riddle as a sponsor, but her motion was also denied on gender grounds.

Lockwood thus struggled against both social practice and the limited legal standing accorded women. Under English Common Law, Lockwood was considered a "feme covert" (English version of medieval Anglo-Norman legal term), that is, a married woman. Her status under the law differed from that of an unmarried woman, as a wife was considered strictly subordinate to her husband. Even in 1873, many states refused to allow a married woman to individually own or inherit property, nor did she have the right to make contracts or keep money earned unless her husband gave his permission.

Nonetheless, Lockwood began to build a practice and won some cases. Even her detractors acknowledged her competence. She became known as an advocate for women's issues; she spoke on behalf of an 1872 bill for equal pay for federal government employees. Lockwood also remained active in several women's suffrage organizations and testified before Congress in support of legislation to give married women and widows more legal protection.

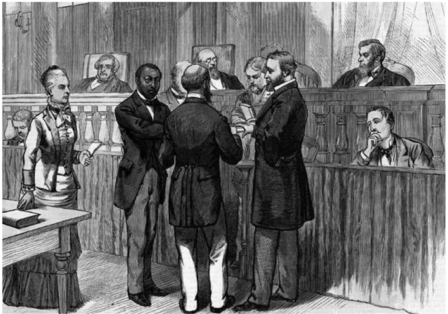
Illustration from Frank Leslie's Illustrated Newspaper showing Samuel Lowreys Supreme Court bar admission

Because her practice was limited in the 1870s due to social discrimination, Lockwood drafted an anti-discrimination bill to have the same access to the bar as male colleagues. From 1874 to 1879, she lobbied Congress to pass it. In 1879, Congress finally passed the law, which President Rutherford B. Hayes signed into law. It allowed "any woman who shall have been a member of the bar of the highest court of any State or Territory or of the Supreme Court of the District of Columbia for the space of three years, and shall have maintained a good standing before such court, and who shall be a person of good moral character" to be admitted to the bar of the U.S. Supreme Court. Lockwood was then sworn in as the first woman member of the U.S. Supreme Court bar on March 3, 1879.

Late in 1880, Lockwood became the first female lawyer to argue a case before the U.S. Supreme Court, arguing Kaiser v. Stickney. In 1906, Lockwood represented the Cherokee Nation in United States v. Cherokee Nation. She was successful in ensuring the payment of the five million dollar suit, one of the largest made to that date to a Native American tribe for land ceded to the government. She also represented hundreds of family members of Civil War veterans in their pension claims. Lockwood later sponsored Samuel R. Lowery to the Supreme Court bar, who was among the first black lawyers admitted.

Lockwood had a 43-year career as a lawyer.

== Campaign for President ==
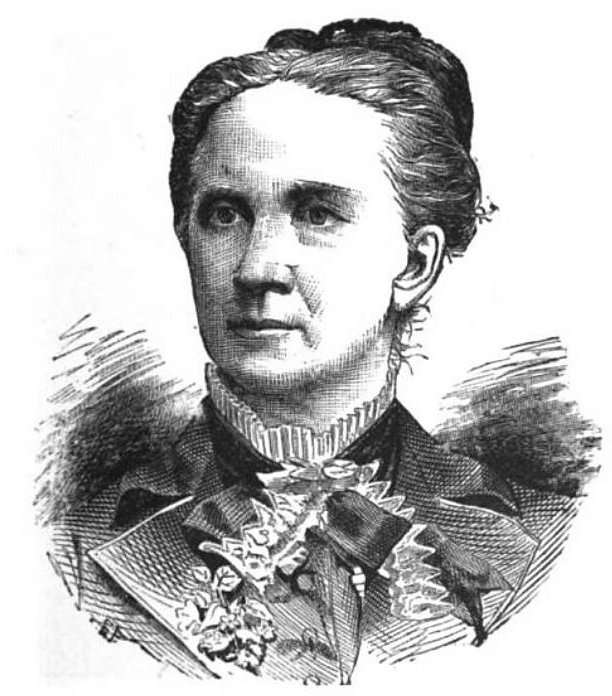
Engraving of Lockwood, c. 1883

Belva Lockwood was the first woman (or second, depending on one's opinion, after Victoria Woodhull) to run for President of the United States. Lockwood ran as the candidate of the Equal Rights Party. She ran in the presidential elections of 1884 and 1888. Her running mate was Marietta Stow in 1884. In 1888, she originally ran with Alfred H. Love, except that when he was nominated, he wasn't informed of it. When he found out, as the president of the Universal Peace Union and a lifelong world peace activist, he was horrified to run as vice president to the commander in chief, and dropped out of the race. Lockwood was in a scramble with no vice president, so, in the end, she chose Charles Stuart Weld, son of progressives Theodore Dwight Weld and Angelina Grimké.

Representing a third party without a broad base of support, Lockwood did not have a serious chance of winning the presidency. A letter she sent to Linda Slaughter provided some insights into her campaign. She wrote: "I intend if possible to get up an Electoral ticket for each State; and thus get up a grand agitation on the woman question, but am not so anxious about the number of votes polled". Notable American Women stated she received about 4,100 votes. Since women could not vote, and most newspapers were opposed to her candidacy, it was unusual that she received any votes. In an 1884 article, the Atlanta Constitution referred to her as "old lady Lockwood" and warned male readers of the dangers of "petticoat rule".

On January 12, 1885, Lockwood petitioned the United States Congress to have her votes counted. She told newspapers and magazines that she had evidence of voter fraud. She asserted that supporters had seen their ballots ripped up and that she had "received one-half the electoral vote of Oregon, and a large vote in Pennsylvania, but the votes in the latter state were not counted, simply dumped into the waste basket as false votes".

== Later years ==
Lockwood was a well-respected writer, who frequently wrote essays about women's suffrage and the need for legal equality for women. Among the publications in which she appeared in the 1880s and 1890s were Cosmopolitan (then a journal of current issues), the American Magazine of Civics, Harper's Weekly, and Lippincott's. In addition to being active in the National American Woman Suffrage Association and the Equal Rights Party, Lockwood served as president of the Woman's National Press Association. The organization for women journalists also advocated for equal rights for women. Her other feminist activities included being appointed Attorney General of the American Woman's Republic, an organization founded by Marietta Stowe and dedicated to preparing women for the rights and responsibilities of full citizenship.

Lockwood believed strongly in working for world peace. She co-edited a journal called The Peacemaker, and acted as an executive board member of the Universal Peace Union; she was one of its representatives at an exposition held in Paris in 1889. She wrote tracts on international arbitration and was one of the nominating members of the Nobel Peace Prize Committee. She was also a delegate to an International Peace Congress in London in 1890. She continued to speak on behalf of peace and disarmament to the year of her death. She was likely disappointed as the United States prepared to enter the war in Europe.

Belva Lockwood died on May 19, 1917, and was buried in Congressional Cemetery in Washington, D.C.

== Legacy ==
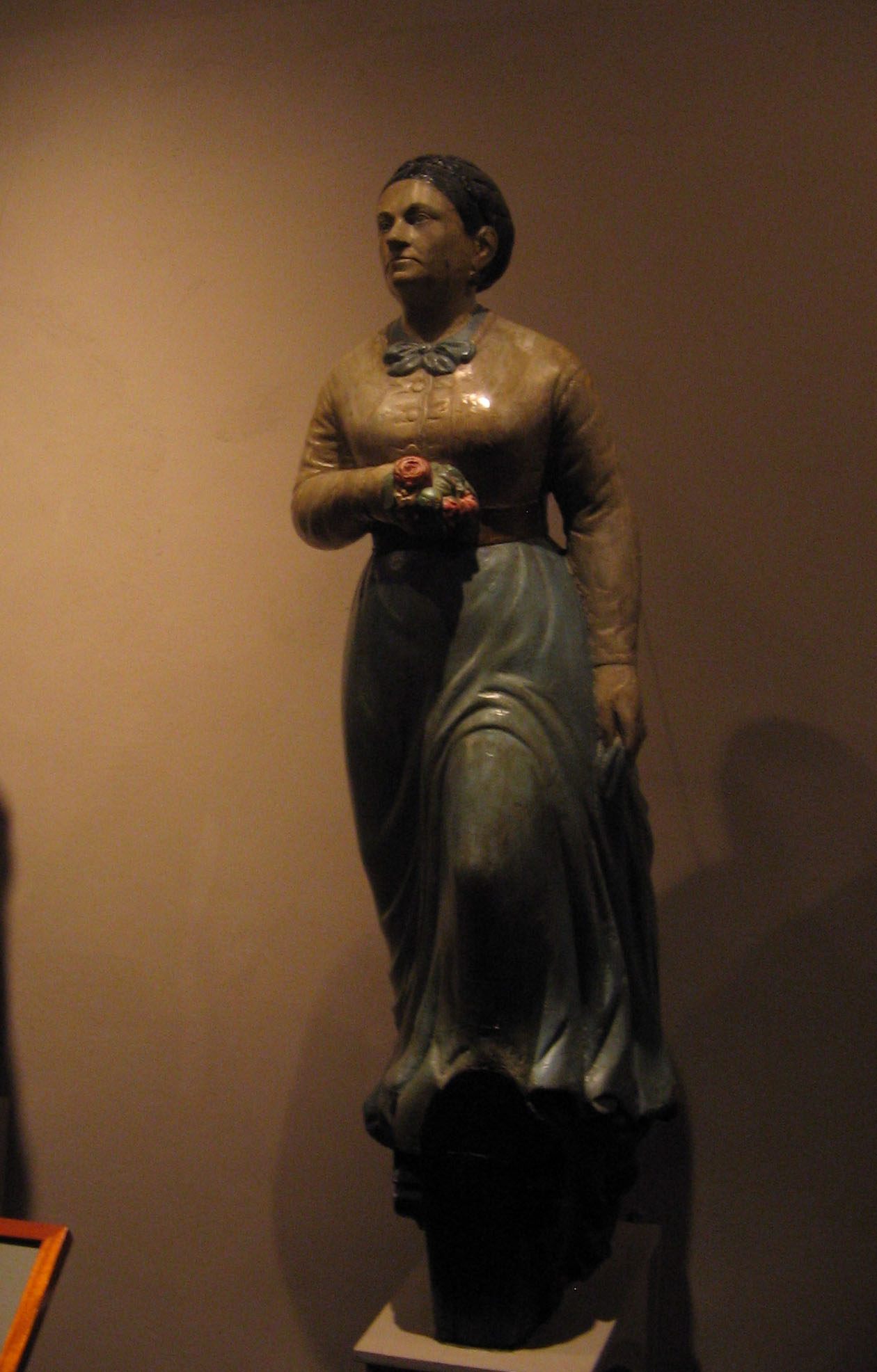
Belva Lockwood ship figurehead

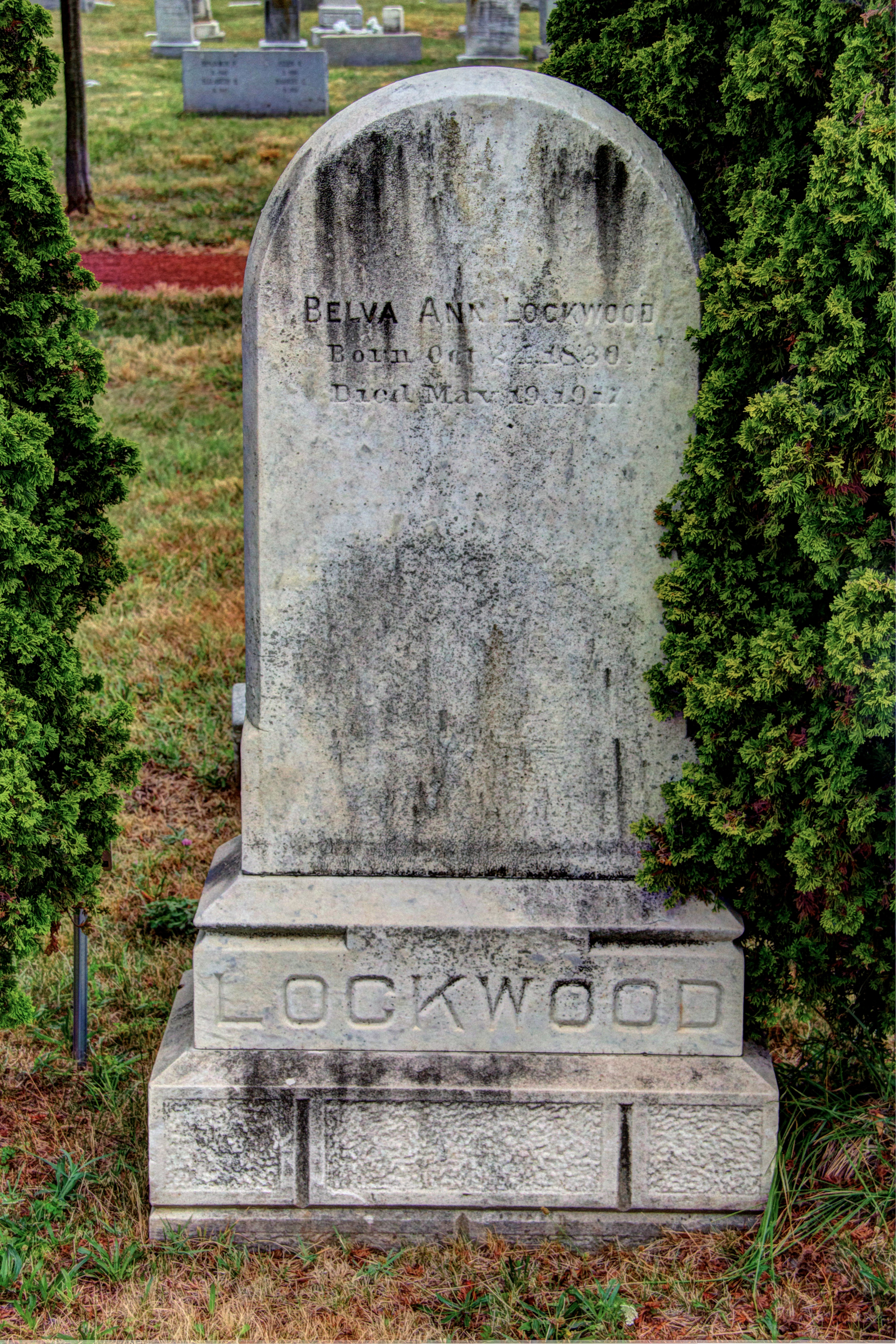
Belva's grave at the Congressional Cemetery.

Syracuse University awarded Lockwood an honorary Doctor of Laws in 1908.

The communities of Belva, West Virginia; Lockwood, Monterey County, California; Lockwood, West Virginia; and the hamlet of Lockwood, New York, were named in her honor. As Lockwood gained renown, mothers named their daughters after her.

At least three figureheads were carved in her likeness: for the ships Martha, Julia Lawrence, and an unnamed ship that has a full-length masthead. One of the figureheads is displayed in the museum at Mystic Seaport in Mystic, Connecticut. "With raised chin she gazes straight ahead as if her attention were fixed on the distant horizon".

During World War II, a merchant marine ship, the Liberty Ship USS Belva Lockwood, was named after her.

The National Portrait Gallery in Washington, D.C., has a portrait of Lockwood by Nellie Mathes Horne. It was painted in 1908, when she received an honorary doctorate in law from Syracuse University.

In 1983, Lockwood was inducted into the National Women's Hall of Fame in Seneca Falls, New York. The statement about her noted:

Using her knowledge of the law, she worked to secure woman suffrage, property law reforms, equal pay for equal work, and world peace. Thriving on publicity and partisanship and encouraging other women to pursue legal careers, Lockwood helped to open the legal profession to women.

In 1986, she was honored by the United States Postal Service with a 17¢ Great Americans series postage stamp.

In 2016, she was honored by the Green Bag with a bobblehead doll.

== See also ==
- List of first women lawyers and judges in the United States
