= Equal Rights Party (United States) =

19th century US political party

- Chairperson: Nettie Sanford Chapin
- Founded: 1872
- Dissolved: 1888
- Ideology: Women's rights First-wave feminism

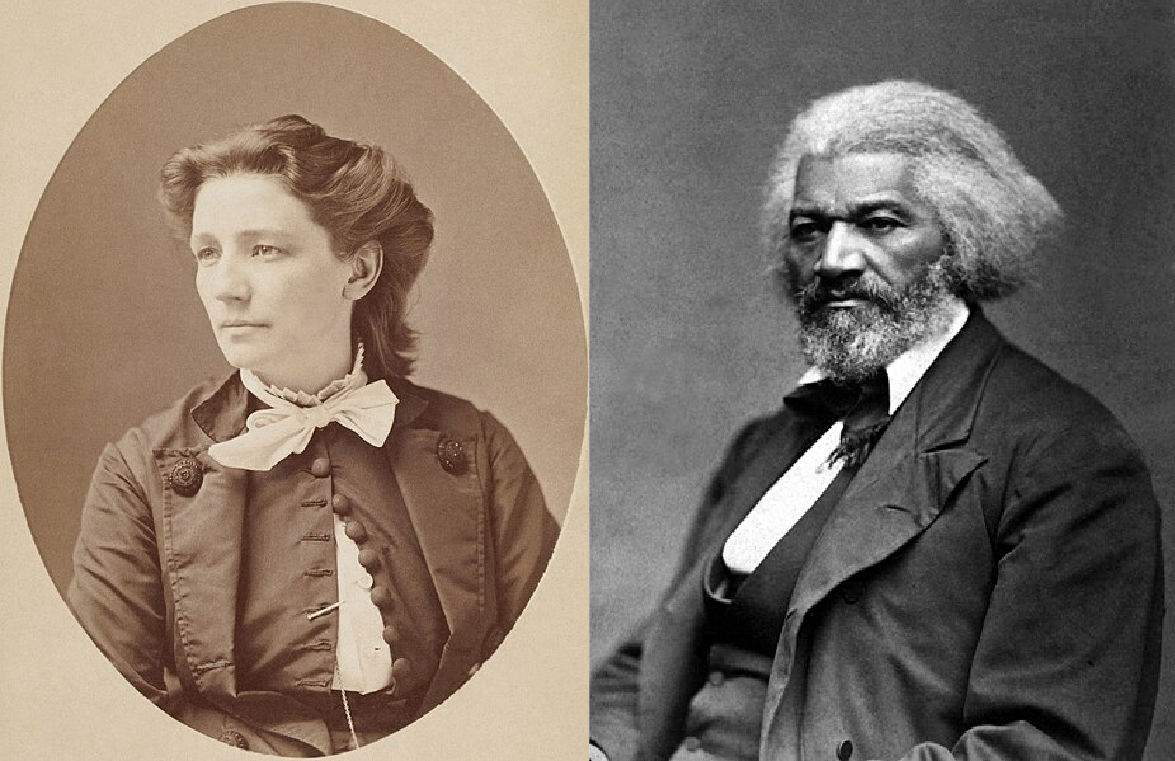
In 1872, Victoria Woodhull and Frederick Douglass were nominated for president and vice president respectively for the Equal Rights Party.

The Equal Rights Party was a United States minor party during the late 19th century that supported women's rights. The party was notable for nominating two female presidential candidates: Victoria Woodhull in 1872 and Belva Lockwood in 1884 and 1888. Woodhull and Lockwood are generally considered the first women who ran for president in the U.S. Although women could not vote in federal elections at the time, there were no laws prohibiting women from running for president. In the 1876 and 1880 presidential elections, party members supported Peter Cooper and James B. Weaver, the national candidates of the Greenback Party. Their platform focused on equal rights for men and women.

== Victoria Woodhull – 1872 candidacy ==
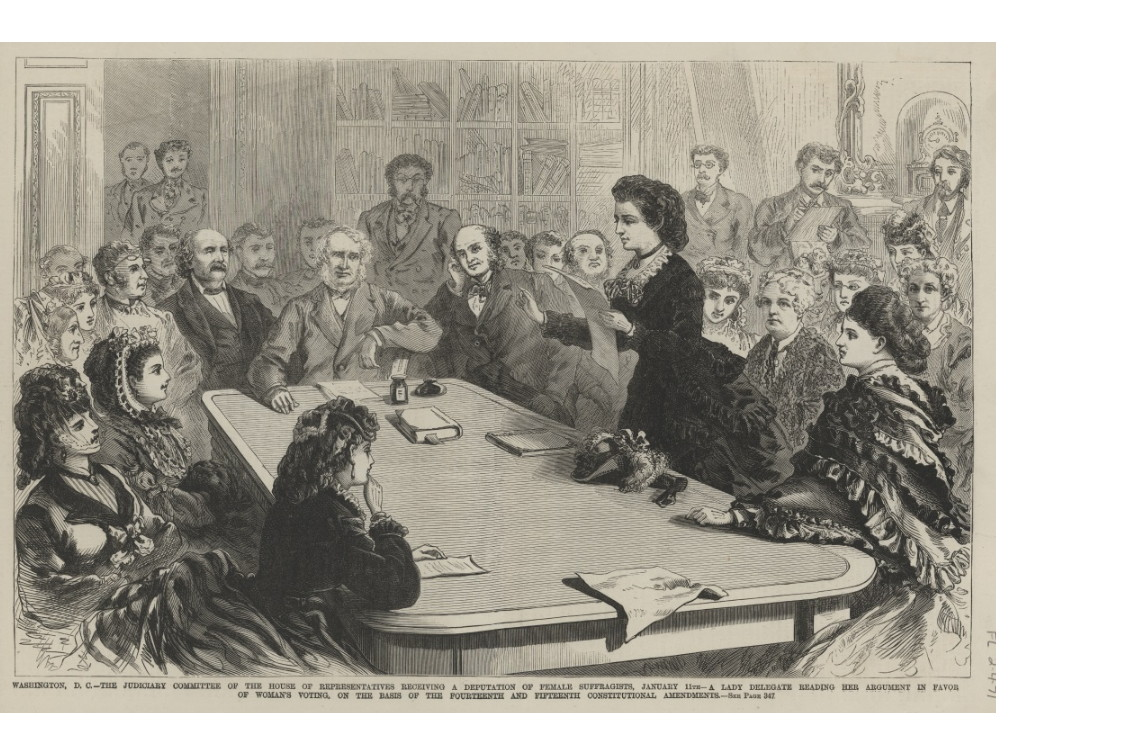
Victoria Woodhull speaking before a congressional committee in 1871

The Equal Rights Party's 1872 presidential candidate, Victoria Woodhull, was the first woman to run for president in the U.S. Born in 1838 in Ohio, Woodhull worked as a psychic, a stockbroker, and a newspaper publisher before announcing she would run for president. Notably, she co-founded the first female-owned stock brokerage firm on Wall Street in 1870, an achievement that brought her national attention. That same year, she also launched Woodhull & Claflin's Weekly, a progressive newspaper that advocated for women's rights, labor reforms, and other social issues.

Woodhull announced her candidacy for president in a letter to the New York Herald on April 2, 1870. In the following summer, she accepted the presidential nomination of the newly-formed Equal Rights Party, a coalition she had helped establish to fill the gap in political representation for "a new coalition of labor, spiritualists, women's rights supporters, and reformers." Although she was only 33 years old—two years shy of the constitutionally required age—she gladly accepted the nomination. As the Equal Rights candidate, she promised to fight for equal numbers of men and women in public office.

The party also selected abolitionist leader Frederick Douglass as Woodhull's running mate. With his nomination, the party sought to "to exhibit to the world that our people are a unit in the defense of the rights of all mankind." However, Douglass never acknowledged the notation, did not participate in the campaign, and supported the re-election of Ulysses S. Grant instead.

Woodhull's candidacy was overshadowed by controversy. Just days before the election, she was jailed on charges of sending "obscene" material in the mail, a response to her newspaper's publication of accusations that prominent minister Henry Ward Beecher had engaged in an extramarital affair. This scandal diverted her attention and funds from campaigning. On Election Day, Woodhull was still in jail, and there is no evidence that ballots bearing her name were cast or counted. Despite these challenges, her campaign for president at a time when women could not vote in federal elections paved the way for future female candidates.

== Belva Lockwood – 1884 and 1888 presidential candidacy ==
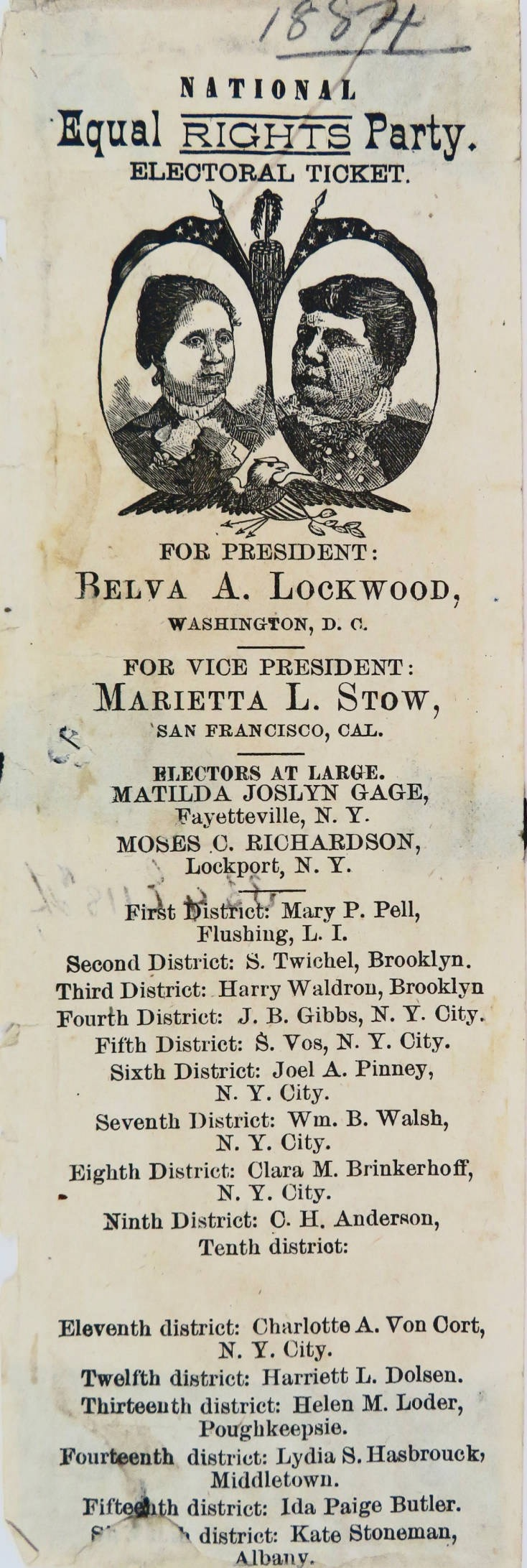
1884 presidential ticket for the Equal Rights Party.

Belva Lockwood was the Equal Rights presidential candidate in both 1884 and 1888. Lockwood was inspired to run in 1884 after reading Marietta Stow's feminist opinion in a newspaper, which was that women needed to be represented in public office separately from men and with their own candidates. Lockwood shared the belief that male political candidates could not represent women no matter how sympathetic they were to the cause. As such, she asked Stow to run as her running mate in the 1884 election.

Lockwood was born on October 24, 1830, in Royalton, New York. She began her career as a teacher but quickly became aware of the stark gender pay disparity, earning less than half of what her male colleagues made. After becoming a widow at a young age, Lockwood recognized the importance of financial independence and pursued a career in law. Despite the prevailing belief that women were unfit for the legal profession, Lockwood later enrolled in a law school in Washington, D.C. She had to "talk her way into admission to the bar," according to Jo Freeman. In 1879, she became the first woman to practice before the U.S. Supreme Court. Lockwood was a keen advocate for women's suffrage. In 1884, she wrote to the editor of the Woman's Herald of Industry that woman should run for office since there was no explicit legislation preventing them from doing so.

As the presidential candidate for the Equal Rights Party, Lockwood's platform consisted of total "equal rights for all, equal marriage and divorce laws, temperance, and international peace", and she also wanted to establish more currency in the system and reorganize the banking system. At the Equal Rights Party's May 16, 1887, Nation Convention in Des Moines, Iowa, members discussed the Equal Rights Party's platform focused on suffrage, pensions for soldiers and sailors, protective tariffs, and free sugar and lumber. The party also sought to repeal the whisky and tobacco tax and oppose taxing unrestricted emigration.

The Equal Rights Party's campaign garnered a great deal of media attention. National news outlets reported the nomination, and a widely circulated journal containing satiric cartoons featured Lockwood on its cover. Lockwood received letters from across the country, many of which contained requests to speak to a public audience. She spoke before large crowds at civic associations and state fairs.

Not all attention she received was favorable. On the whole, Lockwood received more criticism and mockery in the press than favorable sentiments. Many letters she received contained "nasty bits of character assassination", according to historian Jill Norgren. Her rallies, dubbed "Mother Hubbard parades", were met with resistance, as hecklers would arrive to such events with ribbons mocking Lockwood. Lockwood was also featured as a caricature on a political card which implied a salacious relationship between Lockwood and Benjamin Butler, a Civil War general and progressive who had supported Lockwood's petition in Congress to allow women to be allowed into the Supreme Court bar. Lockwood continued to be associated with an "unpopular cause", drawing more attention and intrigue than support to her campaign and the Equal Rights Party as a whole.

== Alfred Love and the Des Moines Convention ==
For Lockwood's 1888 presidential campaign, Alfred H. Love, the President of the Universal Peace Union was nominated as the Equal Rights Party's Vice Presidential candidate, although he would turn down this nomination.

Before the May 1887 Des Moines Convention, Nettie Sanford Chapin, the chairman of the party's National Committee, was aware that Love was favored as the Vice Presidential nominee. She sent him a letter urging him to accept the nomination, but Love did not receive the letter in time and instead found out about his nomination through multiple requests from the press asking him to comment on the nomination.

The convention's delegates cast 310 votes for Belva Lockwood and Alfred H. Love, more than any other candidates running. Several other notable suffragists also received votes, including Elizabeth Cady Stanton and Susan B. Anthony. The May 1887 announcement of the nomination received great national and international press attention.

Love rejected the nomination because he disagreed with a key responsibility of the Vice President-–overseeing the military. However, Love expressed full support for Lockwood and the Equal Rights Party, wishing them success in their global efforts for equality. He credited Lockwood and the Equal Rights Party leaders for their accomplishments and emphasized that he adhered to the principles of Equal Rights and Peace, approaching these ideals with a strong moral conscience. Ultimately, the party elected Charles Stuart Weld as Lockwood's running mate in place of Love.

== Notable members ==
- Victoria Woodhull (1872)
- Alfred Love
- Belva Lockwood (1884-1888)
- Susan B. Anthony
- Frederick Douglass
- Nettie Chapin
- Andrew Hubbard
- Charles Stuart Weld
