= Stanford Andress =

American politician and author

Stanford E. "Andy" Andress is a Colorado author and political candidate.

Andress is the author of the 1996 book, The Civil War: The Sound of Thunder (ISBN 0-9656257-1-0), which he co-authored with his wife, Irene M. Deasy.

In 2002, Andress ran as a write-in candidate for Colorado Congressional Delegation in the 108th United States Congress with a slogan of "Andress for Congress: Honesty". He placed 6th with 109 votes. Republican Bob Beauprez won the seat in a close election over Democrat Mike Feeley by a margin of 101 votes after a recount.

In 2004, he ran on the ballot in Colorado as an Independent for United States President with his wife as his running mate. They received 804 votes, which while a small number compared to the millions both George W. Bush and John Kerry received, was still more than some of the party-affiliated candidates received in Colorado. In particular, the Socialist Workers Party, Socialist Equality Party, Socialist Party, as well as the combined two competing tickets of the Prohibition Party all received a smaller number of votes.
