= Marietta Stow =

American politician and suffragist (1830 or 1837–1902)

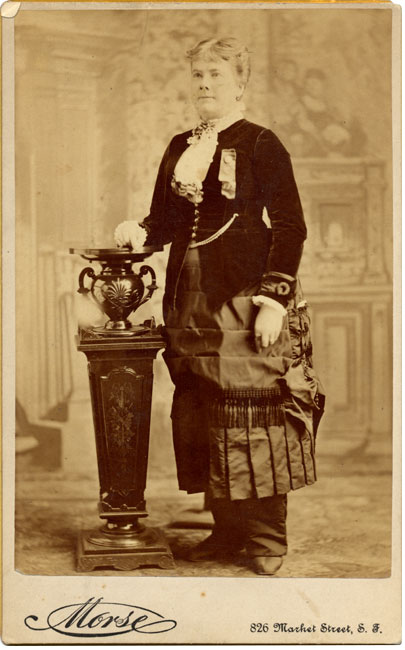
- Born: c. 1830-1837
- Died: 1902
- Works: Probate Confiscation
- Political party: Greenback Party; Equal Rights Party
- Movement: Women's suffrage
- Spouse: Joseph Stow (m. 1866)

Marietta L. B. Stow (1830 or 1837–1902) was an American politician and women's rights activist. Throughout her career in law and politics, Stow advocated for women's suffrage, access to political office, and probate law reform.

== Personal life ==
Marietta Stow grew up in Cleveland, Ohio, and worked as a teacher there throughout her early adulthood. Marietta Stow financed her own causes; she lectured about young girls working in dangerous shops and helping the orphaned daughters of Union Soldiers. After getting divorced in her early twenties, she later went on to marry Joseph Stow at the age of thirty-six. Three years later, Marietta Stow went back out into the political realm and became an active suffragette.

Nine years before women were granted the right to vote in California, Marietta Stow died of breast cancer in 1902.

== Activism for women's rights ==
=== San Francisco Women's Suffrage Association ===
Stow replaced Elizabeth Schenck as president of the San Francisco Women's Suffrage Association after Schenck became sick in 1869. Aiming to widen the support of the movement, Stow called for a meeting in Sacramento to implement a suffrage bill, and she gave lectures in order to raise money for the cause. The organization decided to reject her idea and hold a conference in San Francisco instead, causing Stow to resign from the organization and leave the movement.

=== Probate law reform ===
Eight years into their marriage, Stow's husband died on August 11, 1874, at the age of 48. Stow was in Europe at the time of his death and the courts denied her inheritance of $200,000. This sparked her advocacy for probate law reform, which was an area that experienced extensive gender inequality at the time. In regards to probate law, Stow proposed a bill to the legislature of California in 1876 stating that the widow of a spouse would be granted control over their property and putting their affairs in order. Stow also met with attorney Belva Ann Lockwood in Washington, D.C., and together they came up with a bill to reform federal marital property and estate laws; they brought it to the House of Representatives in 1879, but it was brushed aside.

Stow wrote a book called Probate Confiscation about her belief that women's rights and roles in society involved more than just their positions as wives. In 1879, Stow gave speeches to other women about probate law injustices while writing her book on the side. When the book was finally published, she earned close to one thousand dollars as a result of selling approximately four hundred copies and she promised this money would go towards a college for women.

== Career and political office ==
Stow was nominated by the Greenback Party in 1880 to be the San Francisco School Director. A year after accepting this nomination she formed the Women's Independent Political Party. This new party allowed for women to be further involved in politics and it was a way for them to gain confidence and experience. Stow believed it was vital that women have their own party, but she was still a supporter of the Greenback Party and its candidates.

Stow ran for Governor of California in 1882, as the Women's Independent Political Party candidate. She was anti-Chinese, anti-monopoly, and anti-ring, but she was not against whiskey and tobacco. Stow campaigned these views via her own newspaper. The newspaper was also used to promote her ideas and thoughts on the philosophy of positivism, industrial education for women, and the new science of sociology while being actively against the masculinity of the government. Likewise, Stow promoted the usage of birth control, practicing eugenics, shorter work days, and preventing crime.

=== Vice Presidential candidacy ===
She and Clara S. Foltz nominated Belva Ann Lockwood for President of the United States, and Stow ultimately supported Lockwood on the National Equal Rights Party ticket as its vice presidential candidate in the 1884 United States presidential election. Stow was the first woman to run for vice president of the United States. The Equal Rights Party platform included equal rights for men and women, a curtailment of the liquor traffic, uniform marriage and divorce laws for the entire nation, and "universal peace." Lockwood also supported the rights of the Chinese, which went against Marietta Stow's anti-Chinese agenda. Stow was accused of being outspoken and was notably against the Republican Party at the time and believed it was a dying group. The ticket won 4,194 votes nationwide. Women's suffrage was its major focus.

In 1892 she was a vice presidential candidate again, nominated by the "National Woman Suffragists' Nominating Convention" on September 21 at Willard's hotel in Boonville, New York presided over by Anna M. Parker, President of the convention. This time Victoria Woodhull was at the top of the ticket.

Stow was the editor of Women's Herald of Industry and Social Science Cooperator.
