= Florence Garvin =

American politician (1876–1968)

Florence Garvin (February 27, 1876 — July 10, 1968) was an American women's rights activist, the daughter of former Rhode Island governor Lucius F. C. Garvin and Dr. Lucy Waterman Southmayd, an 1867 graduate of New England Female Medical College. Both her parents were physicians. Her father's political philosophies and ideas lead Garvin to use that in her progressive movements and women suffrage. Florence Garvin was the author of several books including Land Rent, Arden Charm and Americanism and a candidate for United States Vice President in the 1932 and 1936 presidential elections.

She was a member of the National American Woman Suffrage Association, the head of the Rhode Island College Equal Suffrage League and Third Vice-President of the Women's National Single Tax League, a group supporting the ideas of Henry George. Garvin served as Secretary-Treasurer of the International Free Trade League, a short lived branch of the Free Trade League based in Boston, Massachusetts and is listed as the author of "International free trade vs. the international loan", while she served as Secretary-Treasurer. In 1904, Garvin was chosen to be auditor of RIWSA. Education was an important factor in her beliefs when it came to women suffrage. With that belief, Garvin got involved with women colleges. She gave speeches about how women in college can be a viable asset when it came to the women suffrage. She gave speeches at the colleges and organized guest speakers to talk about suffrage movements. In 1907, Florence Garvin and Jeanette France, another suffragist, went to the chair of the house of committee to discuss the presidential suffrage bill. To address women suffrage, Garvin used the media of newspapers to spread the knowledge. Garvin was passionate about women being in government, and she criticized the founding fathers lack of principle. In the period that Garvin communicated her ideas and beliefs, was considered unusual in American society.

In 1924, Garvin moved to Wilmington, Delaware and unsuccessfully ran for Congress. In 1932 she was the running mate of presidential candidate John Zahnd of the National Party, also known as the Independent Party; Zahnd has been called "one of the more intriguing fringe candidates in American history." Her motivation for running linked to the belief of women being involved in government. She was the third woman to have run for vice-president in the United States. They won 1,645 votes versus the 22,821,277 of winners Franklin Delano Roosevelt and John Nance Garner. It was the only time perennial candidate Zahnd was known to have received any votes. She ran again with Zahnd in 1936 at which point the party's name was changed to the Greenback Party. The Greenback Party focused on issues surrounding abuses and currency in the U.S. Federal Reserve and Treasury.

== Notes and references ==
- "Biographical Sketch of Florence Garvin". Alexander Street. https://documents.alexanderstreet.com/d/1010596347
