= 1988 United States presidential election in New Mexico =

- November 8, 1988

Nominee	George H. W. Bush	Michael Dukakis
Party	Republican	Democratic
Home state	Texas	Massachusetts
Running mate	Dan Quayle	Lloyd Bentsen
Electoral vote	5	0
Popular vote	270,341	244,497
Percentage	51.86%	46.90%
County results
Bush
40–50%
50–60%
60–70%
Dukakis
50–60%
60–70%
70–80%
President before election
Ronald Reagan
Republican
Elected President
George H. W. Bush
Republican

The 1988 United States presidential election in New Mexico took place on November 8, 1988. All 50 states and the District of Columbia, were part of the 1988 United States presidential election. State voters chose five electors to the Electoral College, which selected the president and vice president. New Mexico was won by incumbent United States Vice President George H. W. Bush of Texas, who was running against Massachusetts Governor Michael Dukakis. Bush ran with Indiana Senator Dan Quayle as Vice President, and Dukakis ran with Texas Senator Lloyd Bentsen.

Bush won the state with 51.86% of the vote to Dukakis's 46.90%, for a margin of 4.96%. New Mexico weighed in for this election as 4 percentage points more Democratic than the national average. This was also the last election in which a Republican presidential candidate won a majority of the popular vote in New Mexico, although his son George W. Bush would eke out an extremely narrow 49.84%-49.05% plurality over John Kerry in 2004.

The presidential election of 1988 was a very partisan election for New Mexico, with 98 percent of the electorate voting for either the Democratic or Republican parties. As of the 2024 election, this is the last presidential election in New Mexico in which Bernalillo County and Doña Ana County voted for a Republican presidential candidate. The Democratic stronghold in the northern part of the state is evident during this election, and remains largely intact from this point onward to current political times.

== Results ==
1988 United States presidential election in New Mexico
Party	Candidate	Votes	%	±%
Republican	George H. W. Bush; Dan Quayle	270,341	51.86%	−7.84
Democratic	Michael Dukakis; Lloyd Bentsen	244,497	46.90%	+7.67
Libertarian	Ron Paul; Andre Marrou	3,268	0.63%	−0.24
New Alliance	Lenora Fulani; Rafael Mendez	2,237	0.43%	+0.40
Socialist Workers	James Warren; Kathleen Mickells	344	0.07%	±0.00
Workers World	Larry Holmes; Gloria La Riva	258	0.05%	N/A
Prohibition	Earl Dodge; George Ormsby	249	0.05%	+0.01
Write-in		93	0.02%	
Total votes		521,287	100.00%	
Republican win				

=== Results by county ===
County	George H. W. Bush Republican		Michael Dukakis Democratic		Ron Paul Libertarian		Lenora Fulani New Alliance		Various candidates Other parties		Margin		Total votes cast
County	#	%	#	%	#	%	#	%	#	%	#	%	Total votes cast
Bernalillo	92,830	53.62%	78,346	45.25%	1,196	0.69%	431	0.25%	332	0.19%	14,484	8.37%	173,135
Catron	925	62.25%	490	32.97%	53	3.57%	14	0.94%	4	0.27%	435	29.28%	1,486
Chaves	13,367	65.84%	6,730	33.15%	58	0.29%	118	0.58%	30	0.15%	6,637	32.69%	20,303
Cibola	2,640	43.02%	3,458	56.35%	18	0.29%	6	0.10%	15	0.24%	-818	-13.33%	6,137
Colfax	2,256	44.37%	2,785	54.77%	25	0.49%	16	0.31%	3	0.06%	-529	-10.40%	5,085
Curry	8,032	66.17%	3,995	32.91%	36	0.30%	64	0.53%	11	0.09%	4,037	33.26%	12,138
De Baca	643	56.60%	480	42.25%	6	0.53%	7	0.62%	0	0.00%	163	14.35%	1,136
Doña Ana	21,582	51.70%	19,608	46.97%	281	0.67%	200	0.48%	76	0.18%	1,974	4.73%	41,747
Eddy	9,805	52.90%	8,544	46.10%	52	0.28%	112	0.60%	22	0.12%	1,261	6.80%	18,535
Grant	4,196	43.10%	5,443	55.91%	55	0.56%	22	0.23%	19	0.20%	-1,247	-12.81%	9,735
Guadalupe	861	40.63%	1,243	58.66%	4	0.19%	7	0.33%	4	0.19%	-382	-18.03%	2,119
Harding	377	56.10%	291	43.30%	2	0.30%	1	0.15%	1	0.15%	86	12.80%	672
Hidalgo	1,100	54.46%	901	44.60%	7	0.35%	10	0.50%	2	0.10%	199	9.86%	2,020
Lea	11,309	65.36%	5,879	33.98%	48	0.28%	20	0.12%	47	0.27%	5,430	31.38%	17,303
Lincoln	3,511	66.40%	1,690	31.96%	32	0.61%	43	0.81%	12	0.23%	1,821	34.44%	5,288
Los Alamos	6,622	65.22%	3,275	32.26%	191	1.88%	52	0.51%	13	0.13%	3,347	32.96%	10,153
Luna	3,415	51.46%	3,066	46.20%	88	1.33%	60	0.90%	7	0.11%	349	5.26%	6,636
McKinley	5,694	36.81%	9,595	62.04%	46	0.30%	93	0.60%	39	0.25%	-3,901	-25.23%	15,467
Mora	923	36.27%	1,601	62.91%	5	0.20%	15	0.59%	1	0.04%	-678	-26.64%	2,545
Otero	9,984	64.50%	5,284	34.14%	73	0.47%	109	0.70%	28	0.18%	4,700	30.36%	15,478
Quay	2,454	55.62%	1,901	43.09%	23	0.52%	27	0.61%	7	0.16%	553	12.53%	4,412
Rio Arriba	3,024	28.46%	7,503	70.61%	24	0.23%	57	0.54%	18	0.17%	-4,479	-42.15%	10,626
Roosevelt	3,589	63.18%	2,033	35.79%	16	0.28%	32	0.56%	11	0.19%	1,556	27.39%	5,681
San Juan	16,202	58.39%	11,094	39.98%	238	0.86%	143	0.52%	73	0.26%	5,108	18.41%	27,750
San Miguel	2,763	30.62%	6,131	67.95%	37	0.41%	78	0.86%	14	0.16%	-3,368	-37.33%	9,023
Sandoval	9,411	49.50%	9,332	49.09%	146	0.77%	86	0.45%	36	0.19%	79	0.41%	19,011
Santa Fe	12,891	34.91%	23,581	63.86%	255	0.69%	154	0.42%	46	0.12%	-10,690	-28.95%	36,927
Sierra	2,507	60.19%	1,595	38.30%	18	0.43%	29	0.70%	16	0.38%	912	21.89%	4,165
Socorro	3,114	50.09%	2,960	47.61%	88	1.42%	46	0.74%	9	0.14%	154	2.48%	6,217
Taos	2,897	31.29%	6,271	67.73%	39	0.42%	42	0.45%	10	0.11%	-3,374	-36.44%	9,259
Torrance	2,252	57.19%	1,618	41.09%	32	0.81%	31	0.79%	5	0.13%	634	16.10%	3,938
Union	1,291	65.87%	638	32.55%	9	0.46%	17	0.87%	5	0.26%	653	33.32%	1,960
Valencia	7,874	51.80%	7,136	46.95%	69	0.45%	94	0.62%	27	0.18%	738	4.85%	15,200
Totals	270,341	51.86%	244,497	46.90%	3,268	0.63%	2,237	0.43%	944	0.18%	25,844	4.96%	521,287

=== Results by congressional district ===
Bush carried 2 of the 3 congressional districts.

District	Bush	Dukakis
1st	54.2%	45.8%
2nd	58.8%	41.2%
3rd	44.8%	55.2%

== See also ==
- Presidency of George H. W. Bush
