= Ormsby (surname) =

Ormsby is a surname of locational origin, derived from various places in England named Ormsby or Ormesby, such as those in Lincolnshire, North Yorkshire, and Norfolk. These place names are of Old Norse origin, combining the personal name Ormr (meaning "serpent" or "dragon") with the suffix -býr ("farm" or "settlement"), together signifying "the settlement of a man named Ormr."

Notable people with the surname include:

- Alan Ormsby (born 1943), American film director
- Bob Ormsby (born 1963), American alpine skier
- Brendon Ormsby (born 1960), English footballer
- Brett Ormsby (born 1982), American water polo player
- Eric Ormsby (born 1941), American poet and academic
- Frank Ormsby (born 1947), Northern Irish author and poet
- Gene Ormsby (born 1992), Former English rugby league footballer
- George Ormsby (bishop) (1843–1924), Irish bishop
- George Ormsby (Gaelic footballer) (1913–1965), Irish Gaelic footballer
- George Ormsby (politician) (1916–2013), American plumber and political candidate
- George Ormsby-Gore, 3rd Baron Harlech (1855–1938), Conservative British MP
- Henry Ormsby (1812–1887), Irish lawyer and judge
- Hilda Ormsby (1877–1973), British academic and geographer
- John Ormsby (negotiator) (1854–1927), New Zealand negotiator
- John Ormsby (settler) (1720–1805), American settler
- John Ormsby (translator) (1829–1895), British translator
- John Ormsby Vandeleur (Ennis MP) (1765–1828), Irish politician
- John Ormsby Vandeleur (MP for Granard) (1767–1822), Irish politician
- John William Ormsby (1881–1952), English soldier
- Kathy Ormsby (1964–2026), American long-distance runner
- Kenneth Ormsby (born 2000), Canadian ice dancer
- Kristian Ormsby (born 1980), Rugby player
- Lambert Hepenstal Ormsby (1850–1923), Irish surgeon
- Len Ormsby (1890–1983), American racing driver
- Margaret Ormsby (1909–1996), Canadian historian
- Mary Ormsby (born 1960), Canadian journalist and sports editor
- Mary Ormsby (bowls) (1927–2019), Australian bowls player
- Mary L. F. Ormsby (1845–1931), American writer, editor, and educator
- Michael C. Ormsby (born 1957), American lawyer
- Oliver Ormsby (1767–1832), American settler
- Red Ormsby (1895–1962), American baseball umpire
- Robert Daly Ormsby (1846–1927), British engineer and colonial administrator
- Stephen Ormsby (1759–1844), American politician
- Thomas Ormsby (1795–1833), English cricketer
- Timm Ormsby (born 1959), American politician
- Tui Ormsby (born 1978), Australian rugby union player
- Vincent Alexander Ormsby, British Indian Army officer
- Wade Ormsby (born 1980), Australian professional golfer
- Waterman Ormsby (1809–1883), American engraver and inventor
- William Ormsby (1814–1860), American settler
- Zachariah Ormsby (born 1657), Irish Anglican priest
- Zachary Ormsby, Irish Anglican priest

== See also ==
- Ormsby (disambiguation)
- Armsby
- Ormsbee
- Ornsby
- William de Ormesby, English judge
