= 1988 United States presidential election in Washington (state) =

- November 8, 1988

Nominee	Michael Dukakis	George H. W. Bush
Party	Democratic	Republican
Home state	Massachusetts	Texas
Running mate	Lloyd Bentsen	Dan Quayle
Electoral vote	10	0
Popular vote	933,516	903,835
Percentage	50.05%	48.46%
County results
Dukakis
40–50%
50–60%
60–70%
Bush
40–50%
50–60%
60–70%
Tie
40–50%
President before election
Ronald Reagan
Republican
Elected President
George H. W. Bush
Republican

The 1988 United States presidential election in Washington took place on November 8, 1988. All fifty states and the District of Columbia were part of the 1988 United States presidential election. Voters chose ten electors to the Electoral College, which selected the president and vice president. The State of Washington was won by Democratic Massachusetts Governor Michael Dukakis, who was running against incumbent Republican Vice President George H. W. Bush of Texas. Dukakis ran with Texas Senator Lloyd Bentsen, and Bush ran with Indiana Senator Dan Quayle.

The presidential election of 1988 was a very partisan election for Washington, with 98.5% of the electorate voting for either the Democratic or Republican parties. In typical form for the time and political climate in Washington – an East/West split can be seen in the voter turnout: with the coastal counties voting in the majority for Dukakis, and the inland counties voting mainly for Bush.

Dukakis carried Washington state with 50.05% of the vote to Bush's 48.46%, a margin of 1.59%, making it the closest state in the election. This made Washington one of ten states (along with the District of Columbia) to vote for Dukakis, even as Bush won a convincing victory nationally. Washington weighed in for this election as over 9% more Democratic than the national average. For decades prior to 1988, Washington had been a swing state, and it had gone Republican in the four preceding elections, even voting for losing Republican candidate Gerald Ford in 1976. But the state's strong Democratic tilt in 1988 portended the political direction the state would take in the modern era. Dukakis’ 1988 victory began a Democratic winning streak in Washington state that has never been broken since. Washington's Democratic trend was largely driven by the dramatic shift toward the Democrats among urban and suburban voters that began in the 1980s. While Bush won many rural counties, Dukakis won the two most heavily populated counties in Washington state: King County and Pierce County.

== Results ==
1988 United States presidential election in Washington
Party	Candidate	Votes	%	±%
Democratic	Michael Dukakis Lloyd Bentsen	933,516	50.05%	+7.19%
Republican	George H. W. Bush Dan Quayle	903,835	48.46%	−7.36%
Libertarian	Ron Paul Andre Marrou	17,240	0.92%	+0.45%
U.S. Labor	Lyndon LaRouche Debra Hanania Freeman	4,412	0.24%	N/A
New Alliance	Lenora Fulani Wynonia Burke	3,520	0.19%	+0.10%
Workers World	Larry Holmes Gloria La Riva	1,440	0.08%	+0.05%
Socialist Workers	James Warren Kathleen Mickells	1,290	0.07%	−0.05%
Total votes		1,865,253	100.00%	N/A

=== By county ===
County	Michael Dukakis Democratic		George H. W. Bush Republican		Other candidates Various parties		Margin		Total votes cast
County	#	%	#	%	#	%	#	%	Total votes cast
Adams	1,612	37.59%	2,612	60.91%	64	1.49%	-1,000	-23.32%	4,288
Asotin	3,422	53.60%	2,874	45.02%	88	1.38%	548	8.58%	6,384
Benton	14,817	33.66%	28,688	65.18%	511	1.16%	-13,871	-31.51%	44,016
Chelan	8,183	40.78%	11,601	57.82%	281	1.40%	-3,418	-17.03%	20,065
Clallam	11,123	48.80%	11,200	49.14%	471	2.07%	-77	-0.34%	22,794
Clark	40,021	51.11%	37,285	47.61%	1,000	1.28%	2,736	3.49%	78,306
Columbia	730	37.55%	1,172	60.29%	42	2.16%	-442	-22.74%	1,944
Cowlitz	16,090	56.53%	12,009	42.19%	366	1.29%	4,081	14.34%	28,465
Douglas	3,760	40.66%	5,378	58.16%	109	1.18%	-1,618	-17.50%	9,247
Ferry	972	48.10%	972	48.10%	77	3.81%	0	0.00%	2,021
Franklin	4,772	41.67%	6,488	56.65%	192	1.68%	-1,716	-14.98%	11,452
Garfield	593	44.96%	714	54.13%	12	0.91%	-121	-9.17%	1,319
Grant	7,564	40.24%	10,859	57.76%	376	2.00%	-3,295	-17.53%	18,799
Grays Harbor	14,097	60.27%	8,860	37.88%	434	1.86%	5,237	22.39%	23,391
Island	8,510	39.85%	12,552	58.78%	291	1.36%	-4,042	-18.93%	21,353
Jefferson	5,270	54.69%	4,184	43.42%	182	1.89%	1,086	11.27%	9,636
King	349,663	53.88%	290,574	44.78%	8,720	1.34%	59,089	9.11%	648,957
Kitsap	33,748	48.45%	34,743	49.88%	1,158	1.66%	-995	-1.43%	69,649
Kittitas	5,318	50.67%	5,048	48.09%	130	1.24%	270	2.57%	10,496
Klickitat	2,991	49.15%	2,920	47.98%	175	2.88%	71	1.17%	6,086
Lewis	8,629	37.13%	14,184	61.04%	425	1.83%	-5,555	-23.90%	23,238
Lincoln	1,884	40.56%	2,689	57.89%	72	1.55%	-805	-17.33%	4,645
Mason	7,826	50.34%	7,426	47.77%	293	1.88%	400	2.57%	15,545
Okanogan	5,630	47.96%	5,856	49.88%	254	2.16%	-226	-1.93%	11,740
Pacific	5,017	61.18%	3,073	37.48%	110	1.34%	1,944	23.71%	8,200
Pend Oreille	1,925	50.74%	1,802	47.50%	67	1.77%	123	3.24%	3,794
Pierce	96,688	49.72%	94,167	48.42%	3,618	1.86%	2,521	1.30%	194,473
San Juan	3,008	51.74%	2,660	45.75%	146	2.51%	348	5.99%	5,814
Skagit	15,159	46.79%	16,550	51.08%	692	2.14%	-1,391	-4.29%	32,401
Skamania	1,748	55.28%	1,356	42.88%	58	1.83%	392	12.40%	3,162
Snohomish	80,694	48.27%	84,158	50.34%	2,313	1.38%	-3,464	-2.07%	167,165
Spokane	68,520	49.24%	68,787	49.43%	1,843	1.32%	-267	-0.19%	139,150
Stevens	5,068	42.37%	6,576	54.97%	318	2.66%	-1,508	-12.61%	11,962
Thurston	33,860	50.59%	31,980	47.78%	1,090	1.63%	1,880	2.81%	66,930
Wahkiakum	961	59.10%	629	38.68%	36	2.21%	332	20.42%	1,626
Walla Walla	7,448	42.80%	9,683	55.64%	272	1.56%	-2,235	-12.84%	17,403
Whatcom	25,571	51.05%	23,820	47.55%	703	1.40%	1,751	3.50%	50,094
Whitman	7,403	48.28%	7,680	50.09%	250	1.63%	-277	-1.81%	15,333
Yakima	23,221	43.07%	30,026	55.70%	663	1.23%	-6,805	-12.62%	53,910
Totals	933,516	50.05%	903,835	48.46%	27,902	1.50%	29,681	1.59%	1,865,253

==== Counties that flipped from Republican to Democratic ====
- Asotin
- Clark
- King
- Kittitas
- Klickitat
- Mason
- Pend Oreille
- Pierce
- San Juan
- Skamania
- Thurston
- Whatcom

==== Counties that flipped from Republican to Tied ====
- Ferry

== Analysis ==
King County, home to the city of Seattle and its surrounding suburbs, was and is by far the most heavily populated county in the state, and a bellwether county for the state as a whole. In every presidential election since Washington achieved statehood, the candidate who won King County also won Washington state as a whole. While the city of Seattle had long leaned Democratic, the surrounding suburbs had long leaned Republican, making King County a swing county, and thus Washington state a swing state. In 1976, moderate Republican Gerald Ford had carried Washington state 50–46, while winning King County 51–45. In the 1984 Republican landslide, Ronald Reagan won King County by a 52–47 margin. However, Michael Dukakis won King County by a 54–45 margin, a raw vote difference of 59,089 votes, providing more than the entire 29,681 raw vote difference by which he carried Washington state as a whole. The 1988 result started a yet-unbroken Democratic winning streak in King County, and would prove to be the start of a long-term dramatic shift toward the Democratic Party in the county and thus in the state as a whole.

As the city of Seattle grew, and its suburbs continued abandoning the GOP and increasingly trended Democratic in the 1990s and 2000s, King County would be transformed from a swing county prior to 1988 into a Democratic stronghold; twenty years later, in 2008, Democrat Barack Obama would receive over 70% of the vote in King County. The Democratic dominance in King County that began in 1988 would solidify Washington as a strong blue state in the modern era. In the eight presidential elections since 1988, no Republican candidate has replicated the percentages of the vote received by George H.W. Bush in King, Pierce, Snohomish, Kitsap, Island, Whatcom, Skagit, San Juan, or Thurston counties.

As of the 2024 presidential election this is the last election when Kitsap County and Snohomish County have supported the Republican presidential nominee. This also is the last election where the state of Washington was decided by a margin of five points or less. Dukakis and Bush tied in Ferry County. This is the second time in a presidential election in Washington (after 1896) and the last time until Bill Clinton won Georgia in 1992 that two candidates tied in a county.

== See also ==
- United States presidential elections in Washington (state)
- Presidency of George H. W. Bush
