= Ornsby =

Ornsby is an English language toponymic surname, a variation of Ormsby.

Notable people with the surname include:

- George Ornsby (1809–1886), English cleric and antiquarian
- Janetta Mary Ornsby (1871–1954), Scottish suffragist
- Robert Ornsby (1820–1889), English classical scholar and biographer

== See also ==
- Armsby
- Ormsbee
- Ormsby (surname)
