= 1980 United States presidential election in Ohio =

- November 4, 1980
- Turnout: 73.88%

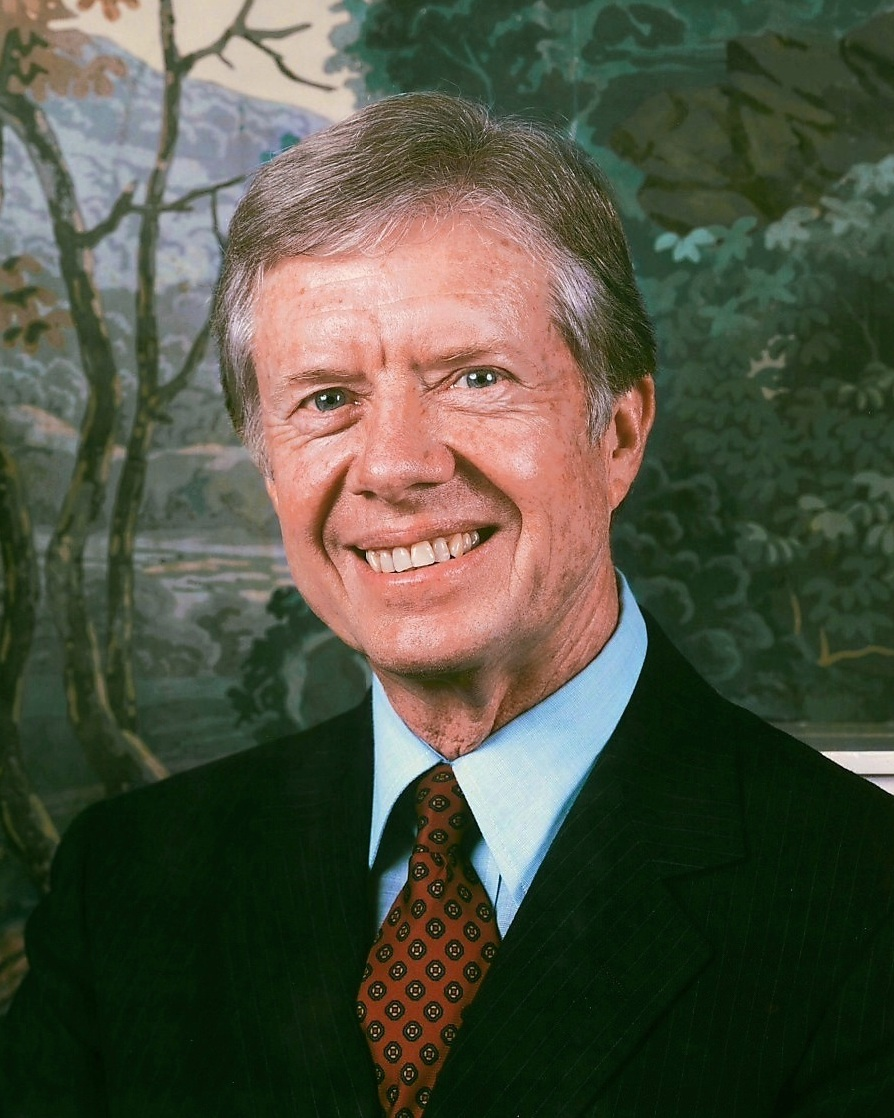

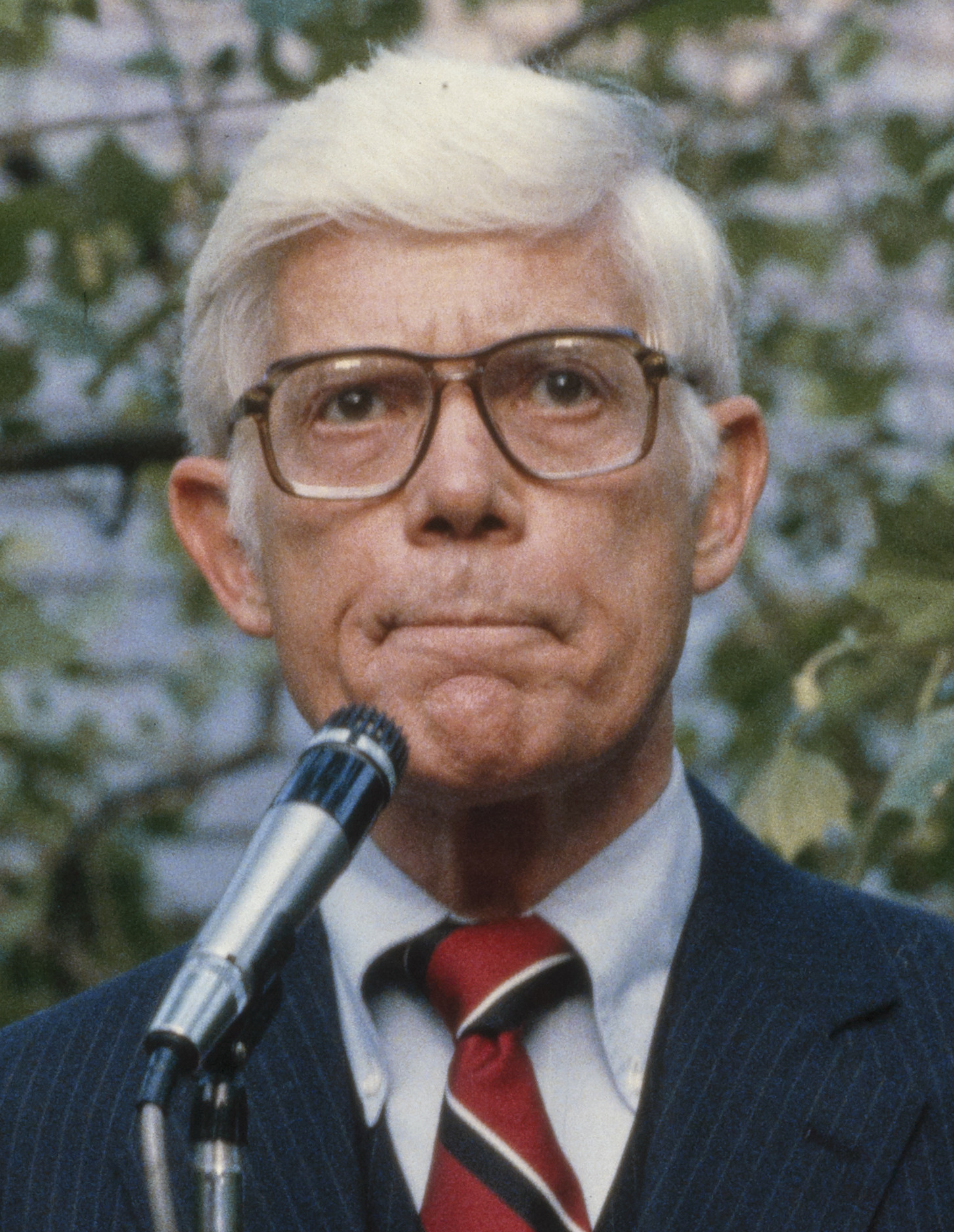
Nominee	Ronald Reagan	Jimmy Carter	John B. Anderson
Party	Republican	Democratic	Independent
Home state	California	Georgia	Illinois
Running mate	George H. W. Bush	Walter Mondale	Patrick Lucey
Electoral vote	25	0	0
Popular vote	2,206,545	1,752,414	254,472
Percentage	51.51%	40.91%	5.94%
County results
Reagan
40–50%
50–60%
60–70%
Carter
40–50%
50–60%
President before election
Jimmy Carter
Democratic
Elected President
Ronald Reagan
Republican

The 1980 United States presidential election in Ohio took place on November 4, 1980. All 50 states and The District of Columbia were part of the 1980 United States presidential election. State voters chose 25 electors to the Electoral College, who voted for president and vice president.

Because of Ohio's long-time bellwether status, Carter and Reagan campaigned heavily in the state from the start of the presidential primaries. At the beginning of the campaign, it was clear that inflation and the Iranian hostage crisis were cutting heavily into Carter's popularity in the industrial areas of the state, although Reagan was not viewed warmly by the state's electorate either.

Despite the coldness with which the incumbent President was received on his first visit to Columbus, Carter did gain a critical victory over challenger Ted Kennedy in Ohio's presidential primary on June 4, owing to his dominance of Ohio's heavily Appalachian rural counties plus the endorsement of both Buckeye State Senator John Glenn and Cleveland's Plain Dealer newspaper.

In the earliest polls after the nominations were settled, Reagan was slightly ahead of Carter, and from midsummer the GOP nominee targeted Ohio as part of his strategy of appealing to industrial workers in the Northeast and Great Lakes region. Ohio gained further attention from a court case that allowed independent candidate and former Republican rival to Reagan John B. Anderson to be on the state's ballot, but Reagan continued his strategy of seeking the support of Ohio's industrial workers during the remainder of the summer. However, after the challenger being ahead for the first half of the fall – although never by an irreversible margin – by mid-October Ohio was seen as close because Reagan was not gaining so much support from industrial workers as he had hoped in August, with voters simply debating “which candidate they liked least”. However, by the beginning of November, Ohio was viewed as the most problematic of the three “key” Midwestern states (Note: Michigan and Illinois were the other two states considered in this context, and Carter also lost them, though by smaller margins than Ohio.) for Carter's re-election battle, as he was only seventy-five thousand votes ahead in Cuyahoga County, which he had won by over 93,000 votes in his 11,000-vote statewide triumph four years previously. The Equal Rights Amendment and abortion were also seen as severely handicapping Carter in the Southern-leaning Appalachian counties where he had done well in 1976.

Ohio was won by former California Governor Ronald Reagan (R) by 11%. Ohio voted very close to the nation for both Carter and Reagan, although Anderson was 0.7% below his national percentage. Reagan was the first Republican since Dwight D. Eisenhower in 1956 to carry heavily populated Lucas County.

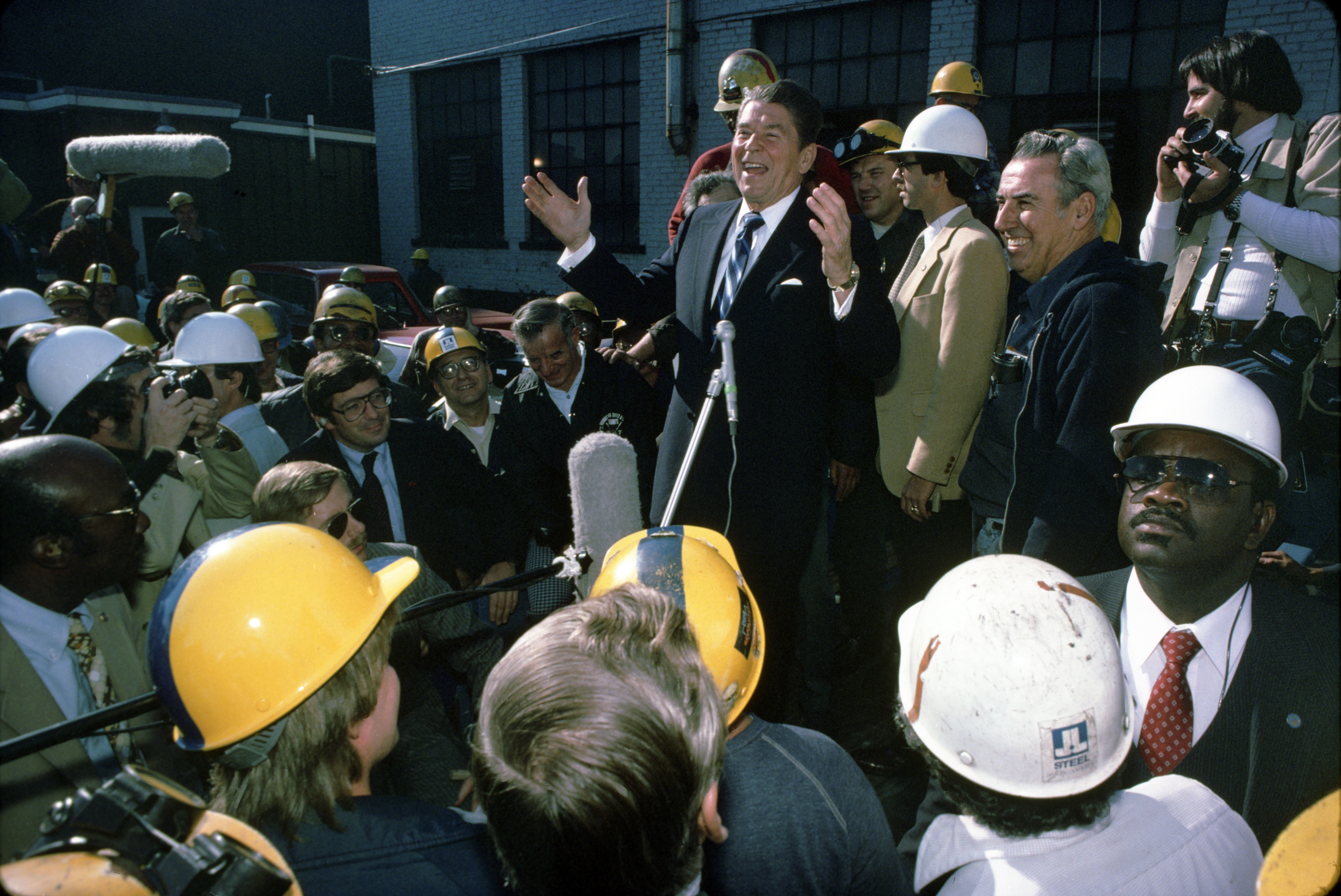
Ronald Reagan campaigning in Youngstown, Ohio on October 8, 1980

== Results ==
1980 United States presidential election in Ohio
Party	Candidate	Votes	Percentage	Electoral votes
Republican	Ronald Reagan	2,206,545	51.51%	25
Democratic	Jimmy Carter (incumbent)	1,752,414	40.91%	0
Not designated	John Anderson	254,472	5.94%	0
Not designated	Ed Clark	49,033	1.14%	0
Not designated	Barry Commoner	8,564	0.20%	0
Not designated	Gus Hall	4,729	0.11%	0
Not designated	Richard Congress	4,029	0.09%	0
Not designated	Deirdre Griswold	3,790	0.09%	0
Write-in	Benjamin Bubar	27	0.00%	0
Totals		4,283,603	100.00%	25

=== Results by county ===
County	Ronald Reagan Republican		Jimmy Carter Democratic		John B. Anderson Not designated		Edward E. Clark Not designated		Various candidates Other parties		Margin		Total votes cast
County	#	%	#	%	#	%	#	%	#	%	#	%	Total votes cast
Adams	5,336	53.75%	4,161	41.91%	303	3.05%	99	1.00%	29	0.29%	1,175	11.84%	9,928
Allen	29,070	65.84%	13,140	29.76%	1,439	3.26%	419	0.95%	86	0.19%	15,930	36.08%	44,154
Ashland	11,691	62.56%	5,142	27.51%	1,128	6.04%	427	2.28%	301	1.61%	6,549	35.05%	18,689
Ashtabula	19,847	49.04%	17,363	42.91%	2,481	6.13%	600	1.48%	176	0.43%	2,484	6.13%	40,467
Athens	8,170	41.26%	9,514	48.05%	1,544	7.80%	378	1.91%	195	0.98%	-1,344	-6.79%	19,801
Auglaize	11,537	65.34%	5,022	28.44%	785	4.45%	212	1.20%	101	0.57%	6,515	36.90%	17,657
Belmont	13,601	42.47%	16,653	52.00%	1,432	4.47%	251	0.78%	87	0.27%	-3,052	-9.53%	32,024
Brown	6,065	53.50%	4,706	41.51%	339	2.99%	151	1.33%	76	0.67%	1,359	11.99%	11,337
Butler	61,231	61.91%	31,796	32.15%	4,717	4.77%	826	0.84%	331	0.33%	29,435	29.76%	98,901
Carroll	5,806	58.94%	3,476	35.29%	406	4.12%	137	1.39%	26	0.26%	2,330	23.65%	9,851
Champaign	7,356	60.17%	4,109	33.61%	596	4.88%	132	1.08%	32	0.26%	3,247	26.56%	12,225
Clark	27,237	50.42%	22,630	41.90%	3,414	6.32%	569	1.05%	165	0.31%	4,607	8.52%	54,015
Clermont	26,674	63.37%	13,199	31.36%	1,697	4.03%	448	1.06%	73	0.17%	13,475	32.01%	42,091
Clinton	7,675	61.90%	3,967	31.99%	608	4.90%	116	0.94%	34	0.27%	3,708	29.91%	12,400
Columbiana	20,798	50.55%	17,459	42.43%	2,320	5.64%	464	1.13%	102	0.25%	3,339	8.12%	41,143
Coshocton	8,359	60.33%	4,725	34.10%	525	3.79%	161	1.16%	86	0.62%	3,634	26.23%	13,856
Crawford	12,424	62.89%	6,058	30.67%	915	4.63%	307	1.55%	51	0.26%	6,366	32.22%	19,755
Cuyahoga	254,883	41.47%	307,448	50.02%	40,750	6.63%	6,915	1.12%	4,686	0.76%	-52,565	-8.55%	614,682
Darke	12,773	58.17%	7,635	34.77%	1,198	5.46%	288	1.31%	64	0.29%	5,138	23.40%	21,958
Defiance	9,358	59.84%	5,096	32.59%	896	5.73%	240	1.53%	49	0.31%	4,262	27.25%	15,639
Delaware	14,740	64.48%	6,417	28.07%	1,278	5.59%	336	1.47%	90	0.39%	8,323	36.41%	22,861
Erie	15,628	51.29%	12,343	40.51%	1,908	6.26%	348	1.14%	243	0.80%	3,285	10.78%	30,470
Fairfield	24,096	60.98%	13,144	33.26%	1,689	4.27%	498	1.26%	88	0.22%	10,952	27.72%	39,515
Fayette	5,827	64.26%	2,810	30.99%	327	3.61%	86	0.95%	18	0.20%	3,017	33.27%	9,068
Franklin	200,948	53.87%	143,932	38.58%	21,269	5.70%	4,429	1.19%	2,467	0.66%	57,016	15.29%	373,045
Fulton	9,519	64.72%	3,972	27.01%	1,026	6.98%	152	1.03%	38	0.26%	5,547	37.71%	14,707
Gallia	6,469	56.73%	4,406	38.64%	401	3.52%	93	0.82%	35	0.31%	2,063	18.09%	11,404
Geauga	17,762	58.81%	9,542	31.59%	2,359	7.81%	421	1.39%	120	0.40%	8,220	27.22%	30,204
Greene	24,922	51.03%	20,068	41.09%	3,160	6.47%	469	0.96%	223	0.46%	4,854	9.94%	48,842
Guernsey	8,180	58.08%	5,121	36.36%	604	4.29%	129	0.92%	50	0.36%	3,059	21.72%	14,084
Hamilton	206,979	57.73%	129,114	36.01%	17,898	4.99%	3,155	0.88%	1,395	0.39%	77,865	21.72%	358,541
Hancock	18,264	67.62%	6,843	25.34%	1,467	5.43%	283	1.05%	153	0.57%	11,421	42.28%	27,010
Hardin	7,457	61.51%	3,863	31.87%	528	4.36%	201	1.66%	74	0.61%	3,594	29.64%	12,123
Harrison	3,639	52.62%	2,848	41.18%	331	4.79%	74	1.07%	24	0.35%	791	11.44%	6,916
Henry	7,584	66.01%	3,059	26.63%	691	6.01%	116	1.01%	39	0.34%	4,525	39.38%	11,489
Highland	7,359	59.35%	4,363	35.19%	454	3.66%	107	0.86%	117	0.94%	2,996	24.16%	12,400
Hocking	4,588	52.02%	3,765	42.69%	312	3.54%	122	1.38%	32	0.36%	823	9.33%	8,819
Holmes	3,860	60.37%	2,094	32.75%	329	5.15%	90	1.41%	21	0.33%	1,766	27.62%	6,394
Huron	11,173	58.32%	6,537	34.12%	1,110	5.79%	279	1.46%	60	0.31%	4,636	24.20%	19,159
Jackson	5,902	55.06%	4,409	41.13%	274	2.56%	85	0.79%	49	0.46%	1,493	13.93%	10,719
Jefferson	15,777	40.99%	20,382	52.95%	1,797	4.67%	395	1.03%	140	0.36%	-4,605	-11.96%	38,491
Knox	10,384	57.07%	6,586	36.20%	987	5.42%	190	1.04%	48	0.26%	3,798	20.87%	18,195
Lake	43,485	50.31%	35,246	40.78%	5,925	6.86%	1,381	1.60%	391	0.45%	8,239	9.53%	86,428
Lawrence	13,799	52.68%	11,366	43.39%	813	3.10%	157	0.60%	59	0.23%	2,433	9.29%	26,194
Licking	28,425	58.28%	17,208	35.28%	2,419	4.96%	544	1.12%	173	0.35%	11,217	23.00%	48,769
Logan	9,727	64.87%	4,319	28.80%	718	4.79%	197	1.31%	33	0.22%	5,408	36.07%	14,994
Lorain	51,034	49.51%	40,919	39.69%	7,324	7.10%	2,909	2.82%	898	0.87%	10,115	9.82%	103,084
Lucas	86,653	45.30%	85,341	44.61%	16,636	8.70%	1,538	0.80%	1,130	0.59%	1,312	0.69%	191,298
Madison	7,166	63.14%	3,565	31.41%	438	3.86%	119	1.05%	62	0.55%	3,601	31.73%	11,350
Mahoning	50,153	40.07%	63,677	50.88%	9,490	7.58%	1,009	0.81%	832	0.66%	-13,524	-10.81%	125,161
Marion	14,605	56.98%	9,419	36.75%	1,255	4.90%	294	1.15%	58	0.23%	5,186	20.23%	25,631
Medina	24,723	58.79%	13,573	32.28%	2,965	7.05%	654	1.56%	135	0.32%	11,150	26.51%	42,050
Meigs	4,911	53.56%	3,827	41.73%	294	3.21%	112	1.22%	26	0.28%	1,084	11.83%	9,170
Mercer	8,673	56.54%	5,506	35.90%	941	6.13%	174	1.13%	45	0.29%	3,167	20.64%	15,339
Miami	19,928	55.65%	12,893	36.01%	2,429	6.78%	463	1.29%	95	0.27%	7,035	19.64%	35,808
Monroe	2,870	45.03%	3,166	49.68%	266	4.17%	47	0.74%	24	0.38%	-296	-4.65%	6,373
Montgomery	101,443	45.49%	105,110	47.13%	13,817	6.20%	1,797	0.81%	842	0.38%	-3,667	-1.64%	223,009
Morgan	3,236	60.31%	1,875	34.94%	156	2.91%	80	1.49%	19	0.35%	1,361	25.37%	5,366
Morrow	6,179	61.96%	3,239	32.48%	383	3.84%	142	1.42%	29	0.29%	2,940	29.48%	9,972
Muskingum	17,921	54.82%	12,584	38.50%	1,329	4.07%	456	1.40%	398	1.22%	5,337	16.32%	32,688
Noble	3,025	57.38%	1,944	36.87%	208	3.95%	66	1.25%	29	0.55%	1,081	20.51%	5,272
Ottawa	8,641	51.18%	6,753	40.00%	1,281	7.59%	176	1.04%	32	0.19%	1,888	11.18%	16,883
Paulding	4,971	58.52%	2,778	32.71%	550	6.48%	159	1.87%	36	0.42%	2,193	25.81%	8,494
Perry	5,725	53.77%	4,383	41.16%	369	3.47%	136	1.28%	35	0.33%	1,342	12.61%	10,648
Pickaway	9,289	61.23%	5,052	33.30%	515	3.39%	229	1.51%	85	0.56%	4,237	27.93%	15,170
Pike	4,426	45.08%	4,938	50.30%	257	2.62%	59	0.60%	138	1.41%	-512	-5.22%	9,818
Portage	22,829	47.37%	20,570	42.69%	3,798	7.88%	769	1.60%	224	0.46%	2,259	4.68%	48,190
Preble	8,376	56.89%	5,416	36.79%	687	4.67%	185	1.26%	59	0.40%	2,960	20.10%	14,723
Putnam	9,752	68.71%	3,742	26.37%	533	3.76%	140	0.99%	26	0.18%	6,010	42.34%	14,193
Richland	29,213	57.48%	18,253	35.91%	2,586	5.09%	596	1.17%	176	0.35%	10,960	21.57%	50,824
Ross	13,251	55.54%	9,355	39.21%	812	3.40%	293	1.23%	148	0.62%	3,896	16.33%	23,859
Sandusky	13,420	55.53%	8,482	35.10%	1,851	7.66%	299	1.24%	114	0.47%	4,938	20.43%	24,166
Scioto	15,881	48.76%	15,552	47.75%	816	2.51%	243	0.75%	76	0.23%	329	1.01%	32,568
Seneca	14,172	60.93%	7,303	31.40%	1,415	6.08%	294	1.26%	75	0.32%	6,869	29.53%	23,259
Shelby	8,988	54.33%	6,425	38.84%	895	5.41%	192	1.16%	44	0.27%	2,563	15.49%	16,544
Stark	87,769	55.87%	59,005	37.56%	8,030	5.11%	1,875	1.19%	427	0.27%	28,764	18.31%	157,106
Summit	92,299	43.35%	102,459	48.12%	15,002	7.05%	2,449	1.15%	710	0.33%	-10,160	-4.77%	212,919
Trumbull	41,056	44.15%	44,366	47.70%	6,281	6.75%	877	0.94%	422	0.45%	-3,310	-3.55%	93,002
Tuscarawas	15,708	52.21%	12,117	40.27%	1,779	5.91%	417	1.39%	65	0.22%	3,591	11.94%	30,086
Union	7,576	67.73%	3,038	27.16%	421	3.76%	131	1.17%	20	0.18%	4,538	40.57%	11,186
Van Wert	7,866	61.11%	4,070	31.62%	741	5.76%	160	1.24%	35	0.27%	3,796	29.49%	12,872
Vinton	2,484	49.05%	2,381	47.02%	138	2.73%	44	0.87%	17	0.34%	103	2.03%	5,064
Warren	22,430	63.14%	11,306	31.83%	1,348	3.79%	332	0.93%	106	0.30%	11,124	31.31%	35,522
Washington	14,310	59.70%	7,936	33.11%	1,121	4.68%	504	2.10%	100	0.42%	6,374	26.59%	23,971
Wayne	18,962	55.87%	12,129	35.73%	2,313	6.81%	419	1.23%	119	0.35%	6,833	20.14%	33,942
Williams	9,146	64.31%	4,015	28.23%	872	6.13%	151	1.06%	37	0.26%	5,131	36.08%	14,221
Wood	23,315	55.23%	14,139	33.49%	4,156	9.85%	416	0.99%	187	0.44%	9,176	21.74%	42,213
Wyandot	5,786	63.06%	2,757	30.05%	407	4.44%	151	1.65%	74	0.81%	3,029	33.01%	9,175
Totals	2,206,545	51.51%	1,752,414	40.91%	254,472	5.94%	49,033	1.14%	21,139	0.49%	454,131	10.60%	4,283,603

==== Counties that flipped from Democratic to Republican ====
- Adams
- Ashtabula
- Brown
- Columbiana
- Harrison
- Hocking
- Jackson
- Lake
- Lawrence
- Lorain
- Lucas
- Meigs
- Ottawa
- Perry
- Portage
- Scioto
- Tuscarawas
- Vinton

== See also ==
- United States presidential elections in Ohio

== Works cited ==
- McGillivray, Alice; Scammon, Richard, eds. (1994). America At The Polls: 1960-1992: Kennedy To Clinton: A Handbook of American Presidential Election Statistics. Congressional Quarterly. ISBN 1568020589.
