= Ormsbee =

Ormsbee is an English language toponymic surname, a variation of Ormsby.

Notable people with the surname include:

- Caleb Ormsbee (1752–1807), American architect
- Dan Ormsbee (1884–1985), American architect
- Ebenezer J. Ormsbee (1834–1924), American politician
- Elliott Ormsbee (1921–2010), American football player
- Francis E. Ormsbee Jr. (1892–1936), American naval aviator
- James Ormsbee Chapin (1887–1975), American painter
- Mary Ormsbee Whitton (1886–1971), American author

== See also ==
- Armsby
- Ormsby (surname)
- Ornsby
