= Willie Mae Reid =

American politician (born 1928)

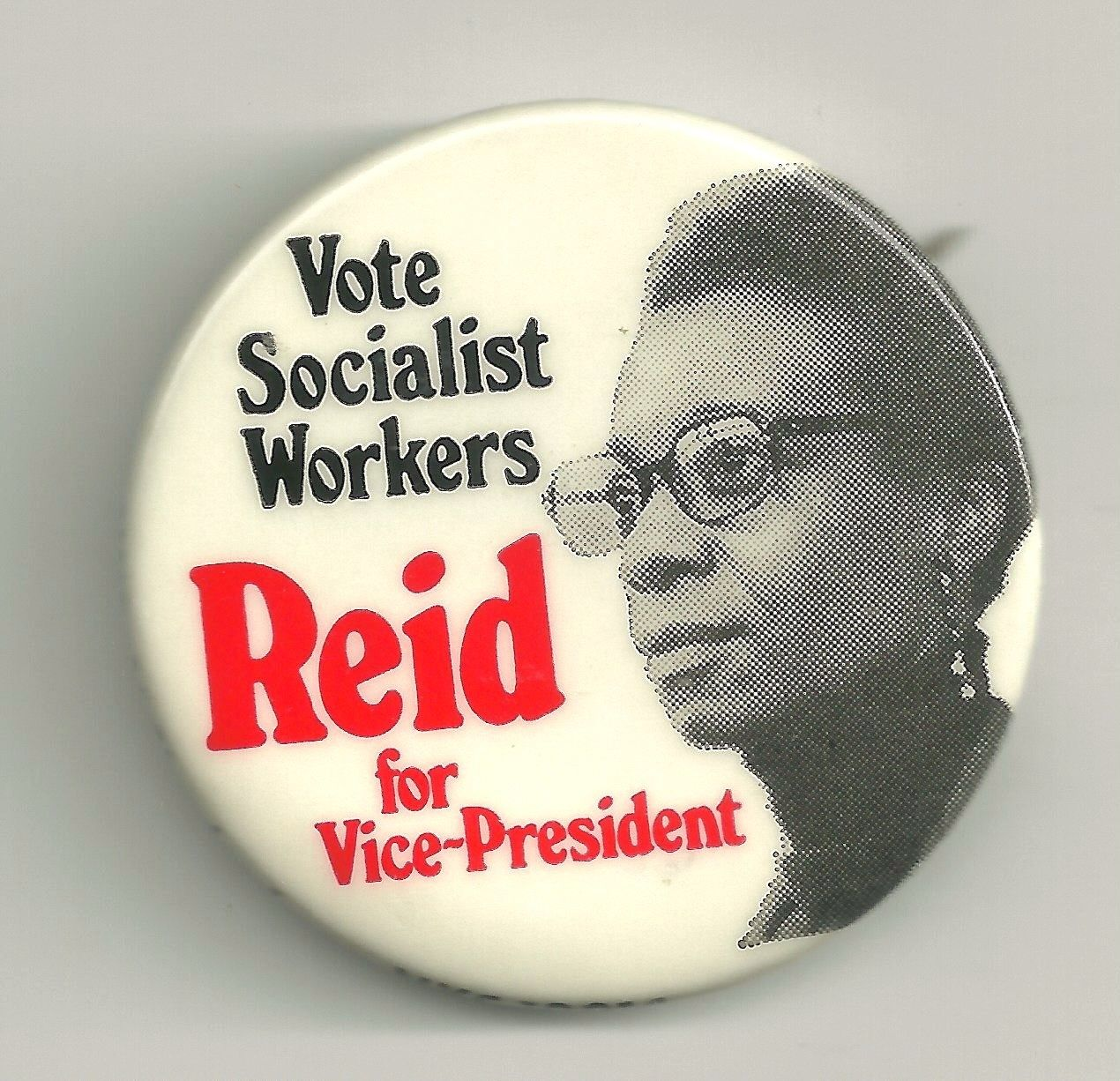
In 1976, Reid ran for Vice President of the United States under the Socialist Workers Party.

Willie Mae Reid (born April 20, 1928) is an American politician who ran as the Socialist Workers Party candidate for Mayor of Chicago in 1975, winning 16,693 votes but coming in third place against Richard J. Daley. The number had fallen from the number of signatures she had acquired to get on the ballot, 66,000. She also ran as their vice presidential candidate in 1976 (presidential candidate: Peter Camejo) and 1992 (presidential candidate: James "Mac" Warren), winning 91,314 votes.

== Bibliography ==
- The racist offensive against busing: the lessons of Boston, how to fight back (1974)
- Last hired, first fired. Affirmative action vs seniority NY: Pathfinder Press. 1975.
- Black Women's Struggle for Equality NY: Pathfinder Press. (1976) (co-author)
- Which way for the women's movement? How to win against the attacks on women's rights NY: Pathfinder Press. (1977) (co-author)

Party political offices
| Preceded by Andrew Pulley and Clifton DeBerry | Socialist Workers Party nominee for Vice President of the United States; 1976 | Succeeded by Matilde Zimmermann |
| Preceded by Kathleen Mickells | Socialist Workers Party nominee for Vice President of the United States; 1992 | Succeeded by Laura Garza |
