= Ormsby =

Ormsby may refer to:

== Places ==
United States

- Ormsby, Minnesota
- Ormsby, Wisconsin
- Ormsby County, Nevada
- Carrick (Pittsburgh), Pennsylvania, neighborhood formerly known as Ormsby or the Ormsby tract

United Kingdom

- South Ormsby, village in Lincolnshire, England
- North Ormsby, village in Lincolnshire, England

== Other uses ==
- Ormsby (surname)
- USS Ormsby (APA-49), Ormsby-class attack transport ship

== See also ==
- Ormesby, a suburb of Middlesbrough
- Ormesby St Margaret, a village in Norfolk
- Ormesby St Michael, a village in Norfolk
- Ormesby Broad, a marsh in Norfolk
