= Peter Camejo =

Venezuelan American politician

- Camejo in 2004

Personal details
- Born: Peter Miguel Camejo Guanche; December 31, 1939 New York City, New York, U.S.
- Died: September 13, 2008 (aged 68) Folsom, California, U.S.
- Party: Socialist Workers (before 1980); Green (2002–2004; 2006–2008); Reform (2004–2006)
- Spouse: Morella Camejo
- Parent: Peter Camejo (father)
- Education: University of California, Berkeley; Massachusetts Institute of Technology

Peter Miguel Camejo Guanche (December 31, 1939 – September 13, 2008) was an American author, activist, politician and Sailing Olympian of Venezuelan descent. In the 2004 United States presidential election, he was selected by independent candidate Ralph Nader as his vice-presidential running mate on a ticket which had the endorsement of the Reform Party.

Camejo was a three-time Green Party gubernatorial candidate in California, most recently in 2006, when he received 2.3 percent of the vote. Camejo also ran in the 2003 California gubernatorial recall election finishing fourth in a field of 135 candidates (2.8%), and in 2002, finishing third with 5.3%. In the 1976 presidential election he ran for the Socialist Workers Party, receiving 90,310 votes.

== Early life ==
Camejo was a first-generation American of Venezuelan descent. At the time of his birth, his mother was residing in the Queens borough of New York City. Although Camejo spent most of his early childhood in Venezuela, he was a "natural born citizen" of the United States and therefore constitutionally eligible for the U.S. presidency later in life.

His parents, Elvia Guanche and Dr. Daniel Camejo Octavio, divorced when their son was seven. Camejo then resided with his mother in the United States and returned to Venezuela during summer holidays to visit family. In later youth Camejo showed talent as a yachtsman, competing in 1960 for Venezuela at the Rome Olympics with his father in the Star class, where they took 21st place.

Camejo entered the Massachusetts Institute of Technology, involving himself in soccer and, increasingly, left-wing politics. Later he studied history at the University of California, Berkeley, where he won election to student council. His participation in a protest of the Vietnam War in 1967 led to his suspension from the university for "using an unauthorized microphone." Then-governor Ronald Reagan deemed Camejo one of California's ten most dangerous citizens due to his presence at anti-war protests. He also participated in one of the Selma civil rights marches.

== Politics ==
Initially, Camejo was a member of the Socialist Workers Party (SWP), a Trotskyist party. As a branch organizer, he sought to reorient the SWP towards the student movement.

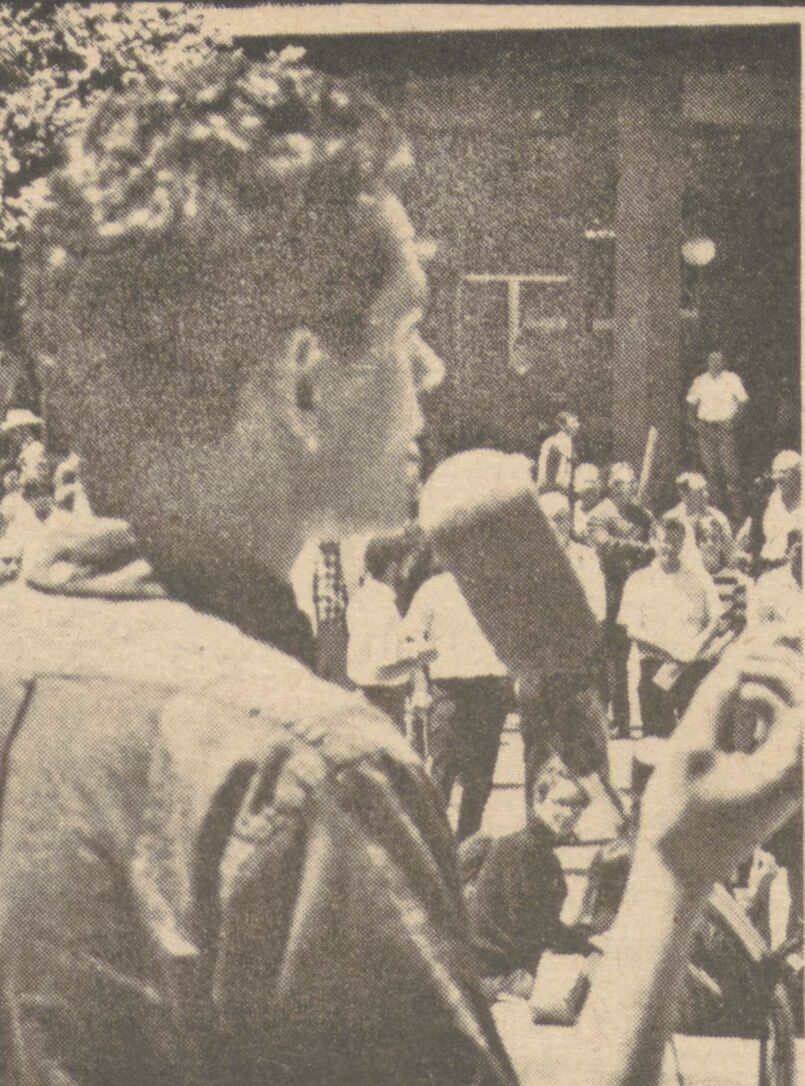
Camejo addressing a crowd, 1967 or 1968

Camejo's first political campaign on behalf of the SWP came in 1967 when as a 27-year old he ran for mayor Berkeley, California. He was the SWP's nominee for president in 1976, running on a ticket with Willie Mae Reid that won 90,986 votes, or 0.1%.

While a member of the Socialist Workers Party, Camejo wrote Racism, Revolution, Reaction, 1861-1877. The Rise and Fall of Radical Reconstruction, published by the party's publishing house, Pathfinder Press. He also met with J. Posadas.

The SWP's policy was to turn its members into "proletarians" by having them take jobs in factories and advocate for a worker-based class struggle. By 1980, Camejo came to disagree with this policy in favor of democratic socialism, and the SWP expelled him. He led the third dissident group of the SWP and formed North Star Network in 1983.

In 1992 Camejo committed $20,000 of his own money toward establishing the Progressive Alliance of Alameda County, an organizational effort that did not sustain itself.

Camejo was quoted in 2002 as claiming that he was a watermelon—green on the outside but red on the inside. However, in January 2004 Camejo initiated the Avocado Declaration which compares Greens, to avocados. "An avocado is Green on the outside and Green on the inside."

Just over a month after the 2004 election, Camejo was elected as one of California's delegates to the National Committee of the Green Party and established the GDI, "Greens for Democracy and Independence," a cadre group within the larger Green Party of California that ran candidates for local Green County Councils. At the 2005 Green Party National Convention, Camejo stated that he would not be a candidate for president in 2008.

Camejo wrote a number of articles concerning the divisions evident in the Green Party in the aftermath of the turbulent 2004 national convention, continuing the themes of the Avocado Declaration in opposing attempts to "cozy up" to the newly formed Progressive Democrats of America.

In August 2008 he attended the convention of the Peace and Freedom Party in order to personally endorse Nader's presidential candidacy.

== Gubernatorial campaigns ==
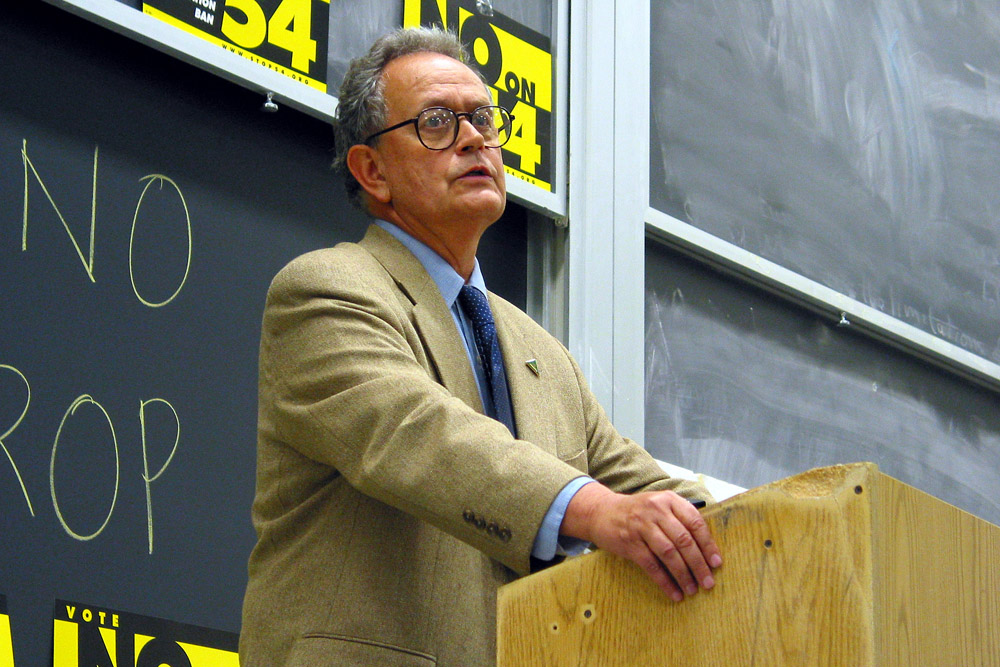
Camejo at UC Berkeley giving a lecture during the 2003 gubernatorial recall election in California

Camejo ran for Governor of California three times, against incumbent governors Gray Davis and Arnold Schwarzenegger in 2002 and 2006, and in the 2003 recall election in which Schwarzenegger replaced Davis as governor.

=== 2002 gubernatorial election ===
In 2002, Camejo ran uncontested in the California Green Party gubernatorial primary. In the general election, he ran as part of the first full slate of Green candidates for all seven of California's partisan constitutional offices. Camejo lost the election to Governor Gray Davis, but he polled 393,036 votes, for 5.3% of the vote, the largest vote total for a third-party in the California governor's race since 1946, when Henry R. Schmidt of the Prohibition Party polled 7.1%. Because the San Francisco Green Party endorsed him, Camejo earned more votes in San Francisco than Republican gubernatorial nominee Bill Simon, a rarity in third-party politics.

=== 2003 gubernatorial recall election ===
In 2003, he was the endorsed Green Party candidate for governor (although several other Greens appeared on the ballot) in an unprecedented California recall election against Gray Davis, in which he polled 242,247 votes for 2.8%, coming in fourth in a field of 135 certified candidates. In a strange preview of the divisions about to erupt on the left in the following year, Camejo first cooperated with, and then competed with, fellow recall candidate Arianna Huffington.

=== 2006 gubernatorial election ===
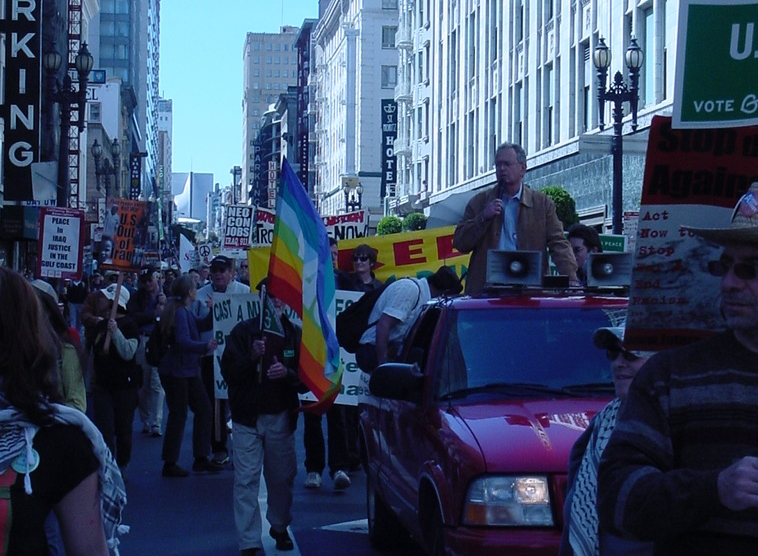
In San Francisco, Peter Camejo demonstrates for peace and against war March 3, 2006.

In 2006, Camejo made his third bid for Governor of California against incumbent Arnold Schwarzenegger and Democratic Party nominee Phil Angelides. Camejo received 193,553 votes, or 2.3% of the popular vote.

Peter Daniels criticized Camejo for "lending his support to the right-wing effort to depose California governor Gray Davis" by recall in 2004. However, the Green Party state convention easily voted to endorse Camejo as a recall replacement candidate.

== 2004 vice-presidential campaign ==
Camejo was submitted as a candidate in the Green Party of California's March 2, 2004, Presidential Preference Primary. Before the primary, he made it known that he was not planning to run for president and that any delegates pledged to him would not be committed to vote for him after the first round. The former gubernatorial candidate received 33,753 votes (75.9%) of the Green Party membership's support in California, and 72.7% of the votes in all Green Party primary elections.

In June 2004, Camejo campaigned for the vice-presidential spot beside two-time Green Party presidential candidate Ralph Nader as independents (i.e. Nader never actually joined the Green Party), running against whoever the Green Party nominee might be. They received the endorsement of the Reform Party, which gave them ballot access in several states they would not otherwise have. With votes for Nader added in, the Nader/Camejo ticket had what appeared to be an insurmountable 83% of Green voters behind their candidacies going into the Green Party National Convention in Milwaukee. However many delegates were alienated by non-Green Party member Ralph Nader's wanting the party's hard-won ballot lines, and by Camejo's maneuver serving as a proxy for Nader in California. After an extremely contentious proceeding the convention nominated Green Party members David Cobb and Pat LaMarche for the Green Party ticket instead. Rejected by the Greens, Nader and Camejo continued their campaign as independent candidates.

Both Nader and Camejo asserted that one of the main reason they ran in the 2004 election was because there were no other national candidates demanding an immediate withdrawal of American troops from what they believe is an immoral and unconstitutionally pursued War in Iraq (though minor party national candidates Green David Cobb, Libertarian Michael Badnarik, Constitution Party candidate Michael Peroutka, Socialist Party USA candidate Walt Brown and Socialist Workers Party candidate Róger Calero all strongly opposed the war). The Nader/Camejo were the only candidates who had a regular voice in the mainstream media arguing for withdrawal, since Ralph Nader was regularly invited to appear on mainstream news, and none of the other candidates received mainstream media coverage.

The Nader/Camejo ticket came in a very distant third in the election, polling approximately 460,000 votes, or 0.4% of the vote. Camejo's supporters claimed this result vindicated the Nader/Camejo team seeking the Green Party's endorsement (of them as non-Green Party candidates) since Cobb/LaMarche received less than one third that many votes with a total of 119,859 votes (0.1%). This was a drop of 95% compared to the Green Party's 2000 national ticket of Nader and his running mate Winona LaDuke. Camejo supporter's claimed that the difference between these outcomes was made up by Nader/Camejo having four-to-one support compared to Cobb/LaMarche within the Green Party. Camejo's experiences on the 2004 campaign are chronicled in Jurgen Vsych's book, "What Was Ralph Nader Thinking?"

The Nader/Camejo Campaign cooperated loosely with an effort by the Green Party Cobb/LaMarche and Libertarian Party Badnarik/Campagna campaigns to do hand recounts across the country in states where vulnerable electronic voting machines had been used and anomalous results were questioned. Nader/Camejo undertook a challenge to the results in New Hampshire.

== Writings ==
Camejo is the author of The SRI Advantage: Why Socially Responsible Investing Has Outperformed Financially.

At the time of his death, Camejo was engaged in writing North Star: A Memoir, published in May 2010 by Haymarket Books.

== Conflict within the Green Party ==
In the run-up to the June 6, 2006, primary elections in California, Camejo helped create a cadre group within the larger Green Party of California, the Green IDEA (later known as IDEA PAC), a California political action committee espousing "Independence, Democracy, Empowerment, and Accountability," to support candidates for county councils, the locally elected leadership bodies of the Green Party of California. The IDEA PAC was not raising or spending money as of 2010.

== Personal life ==
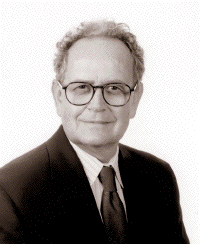
Camejo later in life

Camejo died of lymphoma on September 13, 2008, at his home in Folsom, California. He was survived by his wife, Morella Camejo; stepdaughter Alexandra Baquero, stepson Victor Baquero, and brothers Antonio and Daniel Camejo and Danny Ratner. He last worked as the Chief Executive Officer of Progressive Asset Management, a financial investment firm that encourages socially responsible projects.

== Footnotes ==
Party political offices
Preceded by Linda Jenness; Evelyn Reed	Socialist Workers Party nominee for President of the United States; 1976	Succeeded by Richard Congress; Clifton DeBerry; Andrew Pulley
Preceded by Ezola Foster	Reform nominee for Vice President of the United States; 2004	Succeeded by Frank McEnulty
