= Armsby =

Armsby is a surname, a variation of Ormsby.

Notable people with the surname include:

- Cornelia Armsby (1884–1969), American golfer and socialite
- George Newell Armsby (1876–1942), American entrepreneur
- Henry P. Armsby (1853–1921), American chemist, nutritionist, and academic administrator

== See also ==
- Ormsbee
- Ormsby (surname)
- Ornsby
