= Matilde Zimmermann =

American author and professor (born 1943)

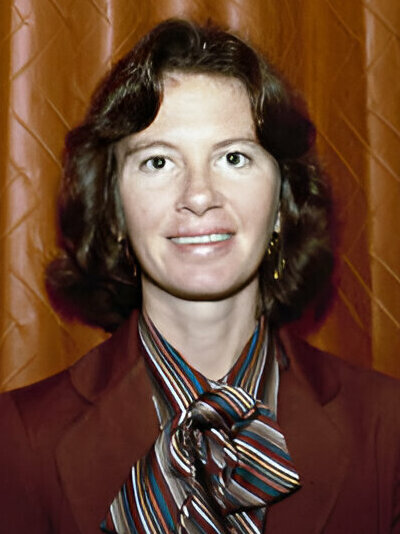
- Zimmermann while running for vice president
- Born: September 6, 1943 (age 83)
- Occupations: Author; professor; politician
- Political party: Socialist Workers Party

Matilde Zimmermann (born September 6, 1943) is an American author and professor who ran as the Socialist Workers Party candidate for United States Vice President in 1980. The party had three different presidential candidates that year, Andrew Pulley, Richard H. Congress and Clifton DeBerry depending on the state. She was at the time a writer for the party newspaper The Militant. Zimmermann also ran as an alternate vice presidential candidate for Andrea Gonzales in some states in 1984; Melvin T. Mason was the presidential candidate.

Zimmermann (PhD History 1998) is the Residente Director of SLC (Sarah Lawrence College) in Cuba and is a faculty member in History and Global Studies at SLC. She has been based in Havana the last two fall semesters (2003 and 2004) as director of SLC in Cuba. Because of the U.S. restrictions on undergraduate academic programs in Cuba, Sarah Lawrence is now the only program of U.S. students at the University of Havana. She once said that the argument that Cubans were living under a dictatorship was "American propaganda".

== Bibliography ==
- Sandinista: Carlos Fonseca and the Nicaraguan Revolution (Duke, 2001) ISBN 0-8223-2595-0
- Carlos Fonseca y la revolución nicaragüense (Managua, 2003)
- Bajo las banderas del Che y de Sandino (Havana, 2004)
- A Revolução Nicaragüense (São Paulo, 2005) ISBN 978-85-7139-653-1
- Comandante Carlos: La vida de Carlos Fonseca Amador (Caracas, 2008)

Party political offices
Preceded by Willie Mae Reid	Socialist Workers Party nominee for Vice President of the United States; 1980, 1984	Succeeded by Kathleen Mickells
