= Mary Ormsbee Whitton =

American author (1886–1971)

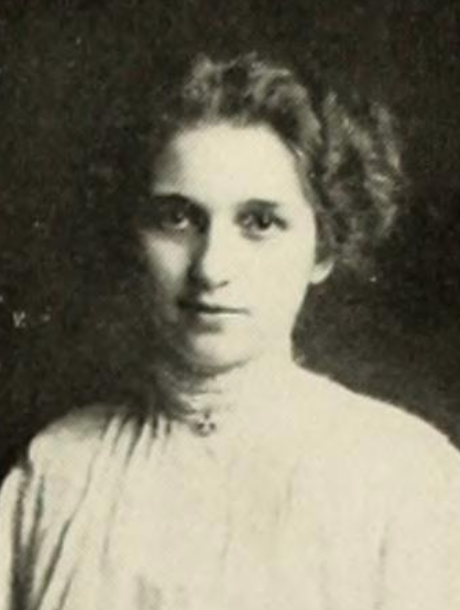
- Born: Mary Royce Ormsbee; February 23, 1886; Springfield, Massachusetts, U.S.
- Died: January 31, 1971 (aged 84); Pound Ridge, New York, U.S.
- Occupations: Writer, historian, biographer
- Relatives: George E. Bria (son-in-law)

Mary Royce Ormsbee Whitton (February 23, 1886 – January 31, 1971) was a 20th-century American author. She wrote First First Ladies (1948) and These Were the Women (1954), both books on women in American history. She also wrote about electrical appliances for the home.

== Early life and education ==
Mary Royce Ormsbee was born in Springfield, Massachusetts, and raised in Brooklyn, New York, the daughter of Edwin Hamilton Ormsbee and Agnes Bailey Ormsbee. Her father was a newspaper editor in Brooklyn, and her mother was an active clubwoman and writer. Her brother Thomas Hamilton Ormbsee and her sister Helen Ormsbee were also writers. She attended Erasmus Hall High School, and graduated from Smith College in 1907.

== Career ==
Whitton published short stories and poems in various publications, including The Touchstone, House Beautiful, Woman's Home Companion, Parents Magazine, Pictorial Review, Children: The Magazine for Parents, Prairie Schooner and The American Scholar.

Whitton's first book The New Servant (1927) was about new and expanding uses of electrical appliances at home. "Mrs. Whitton has robbed electricity of its mystery," Mary Belle Sherman wrote in the book's introduction. "She has taken away the lingering fears which lurked around electrical equipment and she has made it plain that an intelligent woman has everything to gain by a judicious investment in electrical equipment." Whitton's other two books were about American women's history before 1865.

== Publications ==
- "The Craft of Book Binding as Practiced in America" (1918, article)
- "The Mechanics of Living Beautifully" (1920, article)
- "Wanted: A Washing Machine" (1921, article)
- "Rolling through the Ironer" (1922, article)
- "Running Your House on Greased Wheels" (1925, article)
- The New Servant: Electricity in the Home (1927)
- "What Shall I Buy First?" (1928, article)
- "Are You Motor-minded?" (1928, article)
- "Not Luxuries; But merely a new form of household economy" (1928, article)
- "The New Ironers" (1930, article)
- "So Early Monday Morning" (1930, article)
- "For Ever and Ever, Amen" (1944, story)
- First First Ladies 1789–1865: A Study of the Wives of the Early Presidents (1948)
- "At Home with Lucretia Mott" (1951, article)
- "Some New Forty-Niner Letters: From the Vanderbeck-Banfield Collection" (1953, article)
- These Were the Women: U.S.A. 1776–1860 (1954)

== Personal life ==
Ormsbee married Belgian-born businessman William Hean Whitton. He died in 1951. She died from a heart attack at her home in Pound Ridge, New York, in 1971, at the age of 84. She was survived by a daughter, also named Mary Ormsbee Whitton, who married journalist George E. Bria, and two grandchildren.
