= George Ornsby =

English cleric and antiquarian

George Ornsby FSA (1809–1886) was an English cleric and antiquarian.

== Life ==
Born on 9 March 1809 at Darlington, he was eldest son of George Ornsby, of the Lodge, Lanchester. His father taught his sons at home until his death in 1823, when George was sent to Durham School. His brother Robert Ornsby became a noted classical scholar.

After leaving school in 1826 he practised for a time as a solicitor in Durham. He entered University College, Durham as a theological student in 1839. In Easter 1841 he completed his licentiate in Theology, one of his classmates being the future archivist Joseph Stevenson. He held in succession the curacies of Newburn, Northumberland (1841–3); Sedgefield, County Durham (1843–4); and Whickham, in the same county (1845–50). He then became vicar in Fishlake, where he would spend the rest of his life.

In 1872 the University of Durham conferred on Ornsby the honorary degree of M.A., and on 29 May 1873 he was elected a fellow of the Society of Antiquaries of London. In 1879 he was preferred to the prebendal stall of Ampleforth at York Cathedral. He was a lifelong friend of James Raine, the noted antiquarian and founder of the Surtees Society, once a master of Durham School.

== Works ==
In 1846 Ornsby published a short topographical work, Sketches of Durham. For the Surtees Society he edited Denis Granville's Remains, in two volumes, 1861 and 1865; John Cosin's Correspondence, 2 vols. 1869–1872; and Selections from the Household Books of Lord William Howard of Naworth, 1878. He left unfinished an edition of Thomas Comber's correspondence. In 1882 appeared his Diocesan History of York.

== Personal ==
On 1 May 1843 he married Anne (d. 1872), eldest daughter of John Wilson JP and deputy lieutenant, of The Hill, Brigham, Cumberland; they had two sons and two daughters. Ornsby died at his home in Fishlake on 17 April 1886. In an account of his life written in The Durham University Journal it was noted he remained active up until his death, taking two full services on Sunday and visiting a sick parishioner on Monday, dying later that week on Saturday morning after a short and sudden illness.
