= George E. Bria =

Italian-American journalist (1916–2017)

George Emil Bria
- Born: March 2, 1916; Rome, Italy
- Died: March 18, 2017 (aged 101); New York City
- Occupation: Journalist
- Spouses: Mary Whitton; Arlette Philippous Brauer (2000–2017)
- Children: 2

George Emil Bria (March 2, 1916 – March 18, 2017) was an Italian-American journalist who worked for the Associated Press (AP). He spent part of his early career as a war correspondent covering the Italian Campaign of World War II, reporting on the surrender of German forces and witnessing the corpse of recently deceased Italian dictator Benito Mussolini.

Bria later became the chief AP correspondent at the United Nations and retired in 1981. He also wrote gardening columns, tending to his own vegetable garden in Westchester County, New York, after retiring.

== Career ==
Bria was born in Rome and immigrated with his family to Waterbury, Connecticut, at a young age. He graduated from Amherst College and Middlebury College and began his career as a journalist with the Waterbury Democrat and Hartford Courant.

Bria was hired by the Boston AP bureau in 1942, reporting on the Cocoanut Grove fire. The Italian- and French-speaking Bria was sent to the Rome AP bureau in May 1944 and wrote daily dispatches from the Allied front in Italy. Bria was flown to Milan in April 1945 to view the body of Benito Mussolini shortly after his execution, and was the first AP newsman to report on the surrender of German forces in Italy on May 2. After the war, Bria joined the AP bureau in Germany, reporting on the Nuremberg trials and the Berlin airlift, before returning to Rome and New York.

Bria returned to the AP Foreign Desk in 1961 as a supervisory editor, known among subordinates for favoring brevity in reports, once stating that "the D-Day landings could be reported in 400 words". He was chief AP correspondent at the United Nations in 1972–74, before returning to his Foreign Desk editor's position. He retired in 1981. Bria continued in retirement as a freelance writer, publishing columns on gardening until 2002.

== Personal life ==
Bria lived with his wife, Mary, until her death in 1998. In 2000, he married Arlette Philippous Brauer, a writer and editor for the medical magazine MD. He lived in Pound Ridge, an affluent suburb of New York City in Westchester County. Bria was an avid tennis player, participating in national over-85 tennis tournaments.
