= Richard Congress =

American politician

Richard Congress was a candidate for United States President of the Socialist Workers Party. He was one of three candidates the party had that year, the others being Andrew Pulley and Clifton DeBerry. Matilde Zimmermann was the vice presidential candidate on all three tickets.

Congress was on the ballot in Ohio, where he received 4,029 votes. Congress was also mentioned in a United States Supreme Court decision concerning ballot access, Anderson v. Celebrezze, 460 U.S. 780 (1983).

Party political offices
Preceded by Peter Camejo	Socialist Workers Party nominee for President of the United States; 1980	Succeeded by Melvin T. Mason
