= Zachary Ormsby =

Irish Anglican priest

Zachary Ormsby was an Anglican priest in Ireland in the seventeenth century.

Ormsby was educated at Trinity College, Dublin. He was Archdeacon of Ardfert from 1686 to 1693 and Archdeacon of Aghadoe from 1691 to 1692. He was appointed Prebendary of Croagh in Limerick Cathedral from 1693 to 1707; and then of Dysert from 1713 to 1721.
