= Robert Ornsby =

English classical scholar and biographer (1820 – 1889)

Robert Ornsby (1820 – 21 April 1889) was an English classical scholar and biographer.

== Life and career ==
Ornsby was born in 1820, the third son of George Ornsby of Lanchester, County Durham. The cleric and antiquarian George Ornsby was his eldest brother.

He matriculated at Lincoln College, Oxford, on 8 December 1836, and obtained one of Lord Crewe's exhibitions. He graduated B.A. on 3 December 1840, after gaining a first class in literae humaniores. In 1843 he was elected to a fellowship at Trinity College, and graduated M.A. Subsequently, he held the college office of lecturer in rhetoric and the university office of master of the schools, and for four or five years he was actively engaged in private tuition. For a time he was curate of St Olave's, Chichester, but he seceded from the Church of England, and was received into the Roman Catholic communion in May 1847.

For some years after this he assisted Frederick Lucas in conducting his Catholic newspaper The Tablet, while it was published in Dublin. When John Henry Newman undertook the task of founding the Catholic University of Ireland in 1854, Ornsby accepted his invitation to become professor of Greek and Latin literature in the new institution. Later on he became private tutor to the Duke of Norfolk and his brother, whom he accompanied on a short tour through southern and eastern Europe. He was subsequently for a short time librarian at Arundel Castle, but he returned to his old post at the Catholic University in 1874, at the request of the Irish bishops. In 1882, when the senate of the Royal University of Ireland were forming their first staff of examiners, Ornsby was elected a fellow of the university and an examiner in Greek.

He died in Dublin on 21 April 1889.

== Publications ==
- The Life of St. Francis de Sales, Bishop and Prince of Geneva, London, 1856.
- Ἡ Καινὴ Διαθήκη. The Greek Testament, from Cardinal Mai's edition of the Vatican Bible, with Notes, chiefly philological and exegetical; a Harmony of the Gospels, Chronological Tables, &c. Dublin, 1860.
- Memoirs of James Robert Hope-Scott, Q.C., with Selections from his Correspondence. 2 vols., London, 1884.

== Attribution ==
- This article incorporates text from a publication now in the public domain: "Ornsby, Robert". Dictionary of National Biography. London: Smith, Elder & Co. 1885–1900.
