= Zachariah Ormsby =

Irish Anglican priest (1657–1713)

Zachariah Ormsby (1657–1713) was an Irish Anglican priest.

Shepherd was born in Ballgrennan and educated at Trinity College, Dublin. He was Archdeacon of Ardfert from 1686 to 1693; Prebendary of Croagh in Limerick Cathedral from then until his death.
