= James Warren (presidential candidate) =

American politician

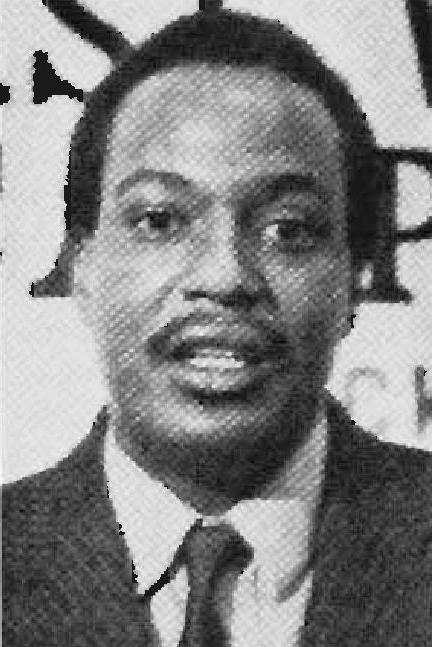
Warren in 1988

James "Mac" Warren is a journalist and steel worker who ran as the Socialist Workers Party candidate for United States President in 1988 and 1992. His running mate in 1988 was Kathleen Mickells, and in 1992 he had two: Estelle DeBates and Willie Mae Reid, varying from state to state. Warren and his running mates received 23,533 votes (0.02%). Warren also ran against incumbent Richard M. Daley for mayor of Chicago in 1991, receiving less than 1% of the vote.

== Bibliography ==
- The National Black Independent Political Party: an Important Step forward for Blacks and other American Workers (1981) (with Nan Bailey and Malik Miah)
- Independent Black Political Action 1954-1978: The Struggle to Break with the Democratic and Republican Parties (1982) ISBN 978-0-87348-684-2)
- A Socialist View of the Chicago Election: Forging a Black-Latino-Labor Alliance (1983) (with Jon Hillson and Malik Miah)

Party political offices
Preceded by Melvin T. Mason	Socialist Workers Party nominee for President of the United States; 1988, 1992	Succeeded by James Harris
