= Kathleen Mickells =

American politician

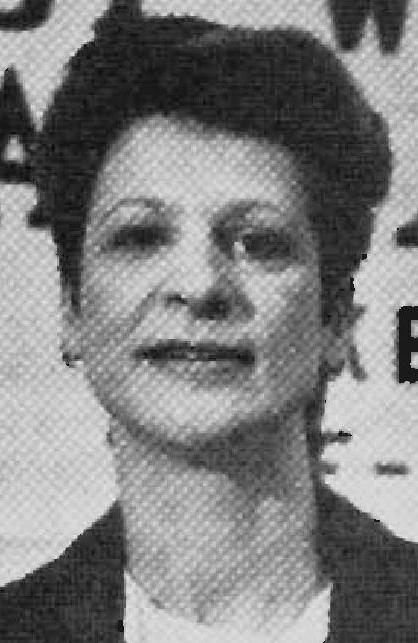
Mickells in 1988

Kathleen Mickells (born 1951) is an American oil refinery worker, coal miner and activist with the Socialist Workers Party (SWP).

Mickells was born in Omaha, Nebraska and worked at the Cumberland Mine in Greene County, Pennsylvania before being laid off in 1987. In 1986, she led a delegation of American women coal miners to tour coal fields in the United Kingdom. In that same year, Mickells attended the International Miners Organisation meeting also in the United Kingdom. In 1987, she was part of the SWP delegation which attended the 75th anniversary of the founding of the African National Congress, which was held in Arusha, Tanzania due to the apartheid policies in South Africa.

== Campaigns ==
In 1983 Mickells ran for commissioner in Washington County, Pennsylvania, and received 7% of the vote. In 1985, she ran a write-in campaign for the United States Congress in West Virginia. In 1988, Mickells ran as the vice presidential candidate alongside James Warren on the SWP ticket. The Warren/Mickells pair received 15,602 votes nationally. In 1991, Mickells ran as the SWP candidate for Mayor of Philadelphia, saying she would bring a working-class worldview to city politics. She finished in sixth and last place of the declared candidates, with 1,811 votes.

Party political offices
Preceded by Matilde Zimmermann	Socialist Workers Party nominee for Vice President of the United States; 1988	Succeeded by Willie Mae Reid
