= George Ormsby (politician) =

American plumber and political candidate

George Ormsby (November 24, 1916 – May 20, 2013) was an American plumber and political candidate from Pennsylvania. In 1988 and 1992, Ormsby was the vice-presidential nominee of the Prohibition Party.

Ormsby was born in Village Green-Green Ridge, Pennsylvania, where he worked in a textile mill.
