= Statewide opinion polling for the 2008 Republican Party presidential primaries =

This article lists statewide public opinion polls conducted relating to the 2008 Republican Party presidential primaries, typically using standard statistical methodology.

== Candidates ==
The known candidates with national campaigns are John McCain, and Ron Paul, and Withdrawn candidates include Jim Gilmore, Tommy Thompson, Sam Brownback, John H. Cox, Tom Tancredo, Duncan Hunter, Fred Thompson, Rudy Giuliani, Alan Keyes and Mitt Romney. Candidates who declined to seek the nomination include George Allen, Jeb Bush, Dick Cheney, Bill Frist, Newt Gingrich, Chuck Hagel, Condoleezza Rice, Mark Sanford, and Rick Santorum. One candidate included in some polls who said nothing either way, and did not enter the race is George Pataki.

On March 4, 2008, John McCain received enough pledged delegates to receive a majority at the convention and became the presumptive nominee of the GOP in the general election.

== Polling ==
=== Alabama ===
Alabama Winner: Mike Huckabee
Primary Date: February 5, 2008
See also

Poll Source	Date	Highlights
Actual Result	February 5, 2008	Mike Huckabee 41%, John McCain 37%, Mitt Romney 18%, Ron Paul 3%, Other 1%
Insider Advantage Sampling Size: 566	February 4, 2008	Mike Huckabee 38%, John McCain 29%, Mitt Romney 20%, Ron Paul 6%, Other 1%, Undecided 6%
Survey USA Sampling Size: 619; Margin of Error: ±4%	February 2–3, 2008	John McCain 37%, Mike Huckabee 35%, Mitt Romney 19%, Ron Paul 6%, Other/Undecided 2%
Rasmussen Reports Sampling Size: 890; Margin of Error: ±4%	January 31, 2008	John McCain 38%, Mike Huckabee 30%, Mitt Romney 20%, Ron Paul 5%, Other/Undecided 7%
Survey USA Sampling Size: 629; Margin of Error: ± 4%	January 30–31, 2008	John McCain 40%, Mike Huckabee 31%, Mitt Romney 21%, Ron Paul 5%, Other 1%, Undecided 2%
Capital Survey Research Center Sampling Size: 371; Margin of Error: ± 5%	January 30–31, 2008	John McCain 42%, Mike Huckabee 28%, Mitt Romney 13%, Ron Paul 4%, Other/Undecided 11%
Capital Survey Research Center	January 28–30, 2008	John McCain 34%, Mike Huckabee 27%, Mitt Romney 15%, Ron Paul 3%, Other/Undecided 21%
Rasmussen Reports Sampling Size: 846; Margin of Error: ± 4%	January 23, 2008	Mike Huckabee 27%, John McCain 27%, Mitt Romney 15%, Rudy Giuliani 8%, Ron Paul 3%, Undecided 20%
Capital Survey Research Center Margin of Error: +/- 5.6%	January 11, 2008	Mike Huckabee 32%, John McCain 25%, Fred Thompson 10%, Rudy Giuliani 7%, Mitt Romney 6%, Other 4%, Undecided 16%
University of South Alabama/Press Register Sampling Size: 439; Margin of Error: ±4.7%	January 7–10, 2008	Mike Huckabee 25%, John McCain 22%, Fred Thompson 9%, Mitt Romney 8%, Rudy Giuliani 5%, Ron Paul 3%, Undecided 29%
Capital Survey Research Center Sampling Size: 431; Margin of Error: ±4.7%	November 19–20, 2007	Fred Thompson 22%, Rudy Giuliani 20%, Mike Huckabee 17%, John McCain 9%, Mitt Romney 5%, Ron Paul 3%, Alan Keyes 2%, Duncan Hunter 1%, Undecided 21%
Capital Survey Research Center Margin of Error: +/- ?% Sample Size: N/A	November 1, 2007	Fred Thompson 26%, Rudy Giuliani 24%, John McCain 12%, Mitt Romney 9%, Newt Gingrich 7%, Undecided 18%
American Research Group Margin of Error: +/- 4% Sample Size: 600 (511 R, 89 I)	July 30 – August 2, 2007	Fred Thompson 31%, Rudy Giuliani 26%, John McCain 16%, Newt Gingrich 8%, Mitt Romney 3%, Sam Brownback 1%, Duncan Hunter 1%, Ron Paul 1%, Mike Huckabee -, Tom Tancredo -, Tommy Thompson -, Undecided 13%
Capital Survey Research Center	July 11–13, 16–19, 2007	Fred Thompson 34%, Rudy Giuliani 20%, John McCain 11%, Newt Gingrich 7%, Mitt Romney 5%
Press-Register/University of South Alabama	April 21–25, 2007	John McCain 23%, Rudy Giuliani 22%, Mitt Romney 12%, Fred Thompson 10%, Newt Gingrich 7%
Capital Survey Research Center	Feb 19–22, 2007	Rudy Giuliani 28%, John McCain 23%, Newt Gingrich 18%, Mitt Romney 3%, Mike Huckabee 3%, Other 2%, Undecided 23%
American Research Group	Feb 8–13, 2007	Rudy Giuliani 31%, Newt Gingrich 25%, John McCain 19%, Mitt Romney 3%, Mike Huckabee 2%, Sam Brownback 1%, Chuck Hagel 1%, Duncan Hunter 1%, Undecided 16%

=== Alaska ===
Alaska Winner: Mitt Romney Primary Date: February 5, 2008

Poll Source	Date	Highlights
Caucus results Sampling Size: 11,620	February 5, 2008	Mitt Romney 44.1%, Mike Huckabee 21.9%, Ron Paul 16.8%, John McCain 15.5%, Uncommitted 1.6%

=== Arizona ===
Arizona Winner: John McCain
Primary Date: February 5, 2008
See also

Poll Source	Date	Highlights
Primary results Sampling Size: 482,343	February 5, 2008	John McCain 47.4%, Mitt Romney 34.1%, Mike Huckabee 9%, Ron Paul 4.2%, Rudy Giuliani 2.6%, Fred Thompson 1.8%, Duncan Hunter 0.2%, Other 0.6%
Rasmussen Reports Margin of Error: ± 3.9%	January 31, 2008	John McCain 43%, Mitt Romney 34%, Mike Huckabee 9%, Ron Paul 7%,
Behavior Research Center Margin of Error: ± 6.3%	January 20–24, 2008	John McCain 40%, Mitt Romney 23%, Mike Huckabee 9%, Fred Thompson 7%, Rudy Giuliani 7%, Ron Paul 3%, Duncan Hunter 1%, Undecided 10%
Arizona State Margin of Error: +/- 5% Sample Size: 375	January 17–20, 2008	John McCain 41%, Mitt Romney 18%, Fred Thompson 9%, Mike Huckabee 7%, Rudy Giuliani 4%, Ron Paul 2%, Undecided 19%
American Research Group Margin of Error: +/- 4% Sample Size: 600 (527 R, 73 I)	October 5–9, 2007	John McCain 26%, Rudy Giuliani 19%, Mitt Romney 18%, Fred Thompson 15%, Ron Paul 5%, Sam Brownback 3%, Mike Huckabee 1%, Tom Tancredo 1%, Duncan Hunter 0%, Alan Keyes 0%, Undecided 12%
ASU/KNXV TV Poll Margin Of Error: +/- 4.5% Sample Size: 295	August 29, 2007	John McCain 24%, Mitt Romney 19%, Rudy Giuliani 18%, Fred Thompson 17%
American Research Group	July 23–26, 2007	John McCain 32%, Rudy Giuliani 23%, Fred Thompson 15%, Newt Gingrich 7%, Mitt Romney 7%, Duncan Hunter 1%, Ron Paul 1%, Tom Tancredo 1%, Sam Brownback 0%, Mike Huckabee 0%, Tommy Thompson 0%, Undecided 13%
Cronkite/Eight Poll	April 19–22, 2007	John McCain 32%, Rudy Giuliani 27%, Mitt Romney 11%, Newt Gingrich 9%, Fred Thompson 6%, Undecided 15%
Behavior Research Center	March 23, 2007	John McCain 34%, Rudy Giuliani 25%, Mitt Romney 11%, Condoleezza Rice 9%, Newt Gingrich 5%, Chuck Hagel 2, George Pataki 1%, Duncan Hunter 1%, Undecided 18%
American Research Group	Feb 8–13, 2007	John McCain 45%, Rudy Giuliani 21%, Newt Gingrich 11%, Sam Brownback 3%, Mitt Romney 2%, Duncan Hunter 1%, Gilmore 0%, Hagel 0%, Mike Huckabee 0%, George Pataki 0%, Ron Paul 0%, Tom Tancredo 0%, Tommy Thompson 0%, Undecided 18%
Cronkite/Eight Poll	January 24, 2007	John McCain 54%, Newt Gingrich 14%, Mitt Romney 9%, Duncan Hunter 2%, Undecided 21%

=== Arkansas ===
Arkansas Winner: Mike Huckabee
Primary Date: February 5, 2008
See also

Poll Source	Date	Highlights
Primary results Sampling Size: 229,153	February 5, 2008	Mike Huckabee 60.5%, John McCain 20.2%, Mitt Romney 13.5%, Ron Paul 4.8%, Uncommitted 0.4%, Rudy Giuliani 0.3%, Fred Thompson 0.3%
Global Strategy Group Sampling Size: 608; Margin of Error: ±4.4%	December 12–16, 2007	Mike Huckabee 39%, Rudy Giuliani 13%, John McCain 11%, Mitt Romney 8%, Fred Thompson 4%, Ron Paul 3%, Undecided 22%
American Research Group Margin of Error: +/- 4% Sample Size: 600 (448 R, 152 I)	March 16–19, 2007	Mike Huckabee 40%, John McCain 21%, Rudy Giuliani 12%, Newt Gingrich 8%, Fred Thompson 5%, Mitt Romney 4%, Tom Tancredo 1%, Chuck Hagel 0%, Sam Brownback 0%, George Pataki 0%, Jim Gilmore 0%, Duncan Hunter 0%, Tommy Thompson 0%, Ron Paul 0%, Undecided 10%

=== California ===
California Winner: John McCain
Primary Date: February 5, 2008
See also

Poll Source	Date	Highlights
Primary results Sampling Size: 2,351,930	February 5, 2008	John McCain 41.9%, Mitt Romney 34.1%, Mike Huckabee 11.6%, Rudy Giuliani 4.9%, Ron Paul 4.2%, Fred Thompson 1.9%, Duncan Hunter 0.5%, Tom Tancredo 0.1%, Other 0.6%
Reuters/C-SPAN/Zogby Sampling Size: 833; Margin of Error: ±3.4%	February 3–4, 2008	Mitt Romney 40%, John McCain 33%, Mike Huckabee 12%, Ron Paul 3%, Other 4%, Undecided 8%
Survey USA Sampling Size: 556; Margin of Error: ±4.2%	February 3–4, 2008	John McCain 39%, Mitt Romney 38%, Mike Huckabee 11%, Ron Paul 5%, Other 5%, Undecided 2%
Reuters/C-SPAN/Zogby Sampling Size: 915; Margin of Error: ±3.3%	February 1–3, 2008	Mitt Romney 40%, John McCain 32%, Mike Huckabee 12%, Ron Paul 5%, Other 4%, Undecided 8%
Rasmussen Reports Sampling Size: 652; Margin of Error: ±4%	February 2, 2008	John McCain 38%, Mitt Romney 38%, Mike Huckabee 10%, Ron Paul 6%, Other 6%, Undecided 2%
American Research Group Sampling Size: 600; Margin of Error: ±4%	February 1–2, 2008	Mitt Romney 33%, John McCain 32%, Mike Huckabee 16%, Ron Paul 8%, Other/Undecided 11%
Reuters/C-SPAN/Zogby Sampling Size: 1185; Margin of Error: ±2.9%	January 31 – February 2, 2008	Mitt Romney 37%, John McCain 34%, Mike Huckabee 12%, Ron Paul 5%, Other/Undecided 13%
McClatchy/MSNBC /Mason Dixon Margin of Error: ±4.8%	January 31 – February 1, 2008	John McCain 40%, Mitt Romney 31%, Mike Huckabee 13%, Ron Paul 3%, Undecided 11%
Suffolk University Sampling Size: 500; Margin of Error: ±4.5%	January 31 – February 1, 2008	John McCain 38.5%, Mitt Romney 32.4%, Mike Huckabee 8.2%, Ron Paul 3.5%, Undecided 13.7%, Refused 3.6%
Field Sampling Size: 481; Margin of Error: ±4.6%	January 25 – February 1, 2008	John McCain 32%, Mitt Romney 24%, Mike Huckabee 13%, Ron Paul 10%, Other 6%, Undecided 15%
Rasmussen Reports Sampling Size: 652; Margin of Error: ±4%	January 29, 2008	John McCain 32%, Mitt Romney 28%, Rudy Giuliani 14%, Mike Huckabee 11%, Ron Paul 5%, Other 6%, Undecided 3%
Survey USA Sampling Size: 506; Margin of Error: ±4.4%	January 27, 2008	John McCain 37%, Mitt Romney 25%, Mike Huckabee 14%, Rudy Giuliani 12%, Ron Paul 4%, Other 3%, Undecided 5%
Politico/CNN/Los Angeles Times Sampling Size: 437; Margin of Error: ±4.5%	January 23–27, 2008	John McCain 39%, Mitt Romney 26%, Rudy Giuliani 13%, Mike Huckabee 11%, Undecided 4%
USA Today/Galup Sampling Size: 552; Margin of Error: ±5%	January 23–26, 2008	John McCain 36%, Mitt Romney 31%, Mike Huckabee 10%, Rudy Giuliani 9%, Ron Paul 4%, Alan Keyes 1%, Other 1%, Undecided 8%
Field Research Sampling Size: 377; Margin of Error: ±5.2%	January 14–20, 2008	John McCain 22%, Mitt Romney 18%, Mike Huckabee 11%, Rudy Giuliani 11%, Fred Thompson 9%, Ron Paul 7%, Other 1%, Unsure 21%
Public Policy Institute of California Sampling Size: 348; Margin of Error: ±5%	January 13–20, 2008	John McCain 29%, Mitt Romney 17%, Mike Huckabee 10%, Rudy Giuliani 10%, Fred Thompson 10%, Ron Paul 5%, Duncan Hunter 2%, Other 3%, Unsure 14%
Rasmussen Reports Sampling Size: 471; Margin of Error: ±4.5%	January 14, 2008	John McCain 24%, Mitt Romney 17%, Mike Huckabee 13%, Fred Thompson 13%, Rudy Giuliani 11%, Ron Paul 4%, Unsure 16%
Survey USA Sampling Size: 509; Margin of Error: ±4.4%	January 11–13, 2008	John McCain 33%, Rudy Giuliani 18%, Mike Huckabee 14%, Mitt Romney 13%, Fred Thompson 9%, Ron Paul 4%, Unsure 4%, Other 3%
Politico/CNN/Los Angeles Times Sampling Size: 255; Margin of Error: ±6%	January 11–13, 2008	John McCain 20%, Mitt Romney 16%, Rudy Giuliani 14%, Mike Huckabee 13%, Ron Paul 8%, Fred Thompson 6%, Unsure 11%
Field Research Corp. Sample Size: 322; Margin of Error: ± 5.7%	December 10–17, 2007	Rudy Giuliani 25%, Mike Huckabee 17%, Mitt Romney 15%, John McCain 12%, Fred Thompson 6%, Ron Paul 3%, Duncan Hunter 3%, Tom Tancredo 1%, Undecided 18%
Survey USA Margin of Error: +/-4.5% Sampling Size: 497	December 14–16, 2007	Rudy Giuliani 28%, Mike Huckabee 20%, Mitt Romney 16%, John McCain 14%, Fred Thompson 13%, Other 7%, Undecided 3%
Survey USA Margin of Error: +/-4.4% Sampling Size: 505	November 30 – December 3, 2007	Rudy Giuliani 32%, John McCain 18%, Mike Huckabee 14%, Mitt Romney 14%, Fred Thompson 13%, Other 6%, Undecided 3%
Datamar Inc. Margin of Error: +/-4.3% Sampling Size: 514	November 23–27, 2007	Rudy Giuliani 28.0%, Mitt Romney 16.1%, Fred Thompson 14.0%, John McCain 9.9%, Mike Huckabee 7.8%, Ron Paul 4.3%, Duncan Hunter 1.6%, Tom Tancredo 1.0%, Undecided 17.3%
Survey USA	November 2–4, 2007	Rudy Giuliani 34%, John McCain 16%, Mitt Romney 15%, Fred Thompson 13%, Mike Huckabee 8%, Other 8%, Undecided 6%
The Field	October 11–21, 2007	Rudy Giuliani 25%, Mitt Romney 13%, Fred Thompson 12%, John McCain 12%, Mike Huckabee 4%, Ron Paul 4%, Duncan Hunter 3%, Tom Tancredo 3%, Keyes 1%, Cox -%, Other -%, Undecided 22%
Survey USA	October 12–14, 2007	Rudy Giuliani 39%, Fred Thompson 18%, Mitt Romney 14%, John McCain 13%, Others 12%, Undecided 6%
Survey and Policy Research Institute at San Jose State University	October 1–8, 2007	Rudy Giuliani 34%, John McCain 17%, Mitt Romney 11%, Fred Thompson 7%, Others 10%
PPIC	September 4–11, 2007	Rudy Giuliani 22%, Mitt Romney 16%, Fred Thompson 16%, John McCain 15%, Duncan Hunter 3%, Mike Huckabee 2%, Tom Tancredo 2%, Ron Paul 1%, Sam Brownback <1%, Other 3%, Don't Know 20%
Survey USA	September 7–9, 2007	Rudy Giuliani 28%, Fred Thompson 26%, John McCain 18%, Mitt Romney 14%, Other 10%, Undecided 3%
Field Research Corporation Margin of error: +/- 5.4% Sampling size: 348	August 3–12, 2007	Rudy Giuliani 35%, Mitt Romney 14%, Fred Thompson 13%, John McCain 9%, Tom Tancredo 3%, Duncan Hunter 2%, Mike Huckabee 1%, Sam Brownback 1%, Ron Paul 1%, Undecided 20%
Survey USA	August 2–5, 2007	Rudy Giuliani 39%, Fred Thompson 19%, John McCain 16%, Mitt Romney 10%, Other 11%, Undecided 4%
American Research Group	July 30 – August 2, 2007	Rudy Giuliani 30%, Mitt Romney 18%, Fred Thompson 18%, Newt Gingrich 7%, John McCain 7%, Hunter 2%, Paul 2%, Tancredo 2%, Brownback 1%, Tommy Thompson 1%, Huckabee -, Undecided 12%
Survey USA	June 29 – July 1, 2007	Rudy Giuliani 32%, John McCain 19%, Fred Thompson 19%, Mitt Romney 9%, Newt Gingrich 6%, Others 9%, Undecided 7%
Survey & Policy Research Institute Margin of Error: +/- 3.1%	June 18–22, 2007	Rudy Giuliani 25%, Fred Thompson 16%, John McCain 14%, Mitt Romney 5%, Others 11%, Undecided 29%
Datamar Inc. Margin of Error: +/-4.1% Sampling Size: 572	June 6–11, 2007	Mitt Romney 32.3%, Rudy Giuliani 14.7%, Duncan Hunter 11%, Tom Tancredo 5.9%, John McCain 5.4%, Fred Thompson 4.9%, Mike Huckabee 3.1%, Ron Paul 3.1%, Tommy Thompson 3.1%, Sam Brownback 2.1%, Jim Gilmore .7%, Undecided 13.5%
Survey USA	June 1–3, 2007	Rudy Giuliani 28%, John McCain 21%, Fred Thompson 21%, Mitt Romney 11%, Newt Gingrich 8%, Other 8%, Undecided 3%
American Research Group	May 4–8, 2007	Rudy Giuliani 27%, John McCain 24%, Mitt Romney 11%, Fred Thompson 12%, Newt Gingrich 5%, Brownback 1%, Gilmore 1%, Hagel 1%, Huckabee 1%, Hunter 1%, Paul 1%, Tancredo 1%, Tommy Thompson 1%, Pataki -, Undecided 13%
Survey USA	May 4–6, 2007	Rudy Giuliani 34%, John McCain 21%, Mitt Romney 12%, Fred Thompson 11%, Newt Gingrich 9%, Other 8%, Undecided 5%
SurveyUSA	Mar 30 – April 1, 2007	Rudy Giuliani 43%, John McCain 24%, Newt Gingrich 10%, Mitt Romney 7%, Other 11%, Undecided 5%
The Field (announced candidates)	Mar 20–21, 2007	Rudy Giuliani 36%, John McCain 24%, Mitt Romney 7%, Hunter 4%, Tancredo 4%, Huckabee 3%, Hagel 2%, Brownback 2%, Paul 1% Undecided 17%
The Field (prospective candidates)	Mar 20–21, 2007	Rudy Giuliani 29%, John McCain 21%, Newt Gingrich 9%, Fred Thompson 7%, Mitt Romney 7%, Hunter 3%, Tancredo 3%, Huckabee 2%, Hagel 2%, Brownback 2%, Paul 1% Undecided 14%
SurveyUSA	Mar 3–5, 2007	Rudy Giuliani 41%, John McCain 23%, Newt Gingrich 13%, Mitt Romney 8%, Other 8%, Undecided 7%
Datamar Inc.	Feb 9–13, 2007	Rudy Giuliani 40.9%, John McCain 17.4%, Mitt Romney 10.5%, Duncan Hunter 5.9%, Sam Brownback 3.8%, Tom Tancredo 3.9%, Mike Huckabee 1.9%, Ron Paul 0.7%, Jim Gilmore 0.4%, Undecided 14.8%
American Research Group	January 4–7, 2007	Rudy Giuliani 33%, Newt Gingrich 19%, John McCain 18%, Chuck Hagel 5%, Mitt Romney 3%, Duncan Hunter 1%, Undecided 22%

=== Colorado ===
Colorado Winner: Mitt Romney
Caucus Date: February 5, 2008
See also

Poll Source	Date	Highlights
Caucus results Sampling Size: 56,027	February 5, 2008	Mitt Romney 59.4%, John McCain 19%, Mike Huckabee 13% Ron Paul 8.3%, Others 0.3%
Mason-Dixon Margin of Error: +/- 3.5% Sample Size: 800	January 21–23, 2008	Mitt Romney 43%, John McCain 24%, Mike Huckabee 17% Ron Paul 5%, Rudy Giuliani 4%
American Research Group Margin of Error: +/- 4% Sample Size: 600 (522 R, 78 Unaffiliated)	September 15–18, 2007	Fred Thompson 25%, Rudy Giuliani 20%, John McCain 12%, Mitt Romney 8%, Mike Huckabee 8%, Newt Gingrich 5%, Tom Tancredo 4%, Ron Paul 1%, Sam Brownback 1%, Duncan Hunter 1%, Undecided 15%
Ciruli Associates for the Economic Development Council Of Colorado	September 12–15, 2007	Fred Thompson 27%, Rudy Giuliani 19%, John McCain 11%
American Research Group	July 15–18, 2007	Rudy Giuliani 35%, Fred Thompson 20%, John McCain 11%, Mitt Romney 9%, Newt Gingrich 6%, Tom Tancredo 4%, Sam Brownback 1%, Mike Huckabee 1%, Ron Paul 1%, Jim Gilmore 0%, Chuck Hagel 0%, Duncan Hunter 0%, George Pataki 0%, Tommy Thompson -, Undecided 12%
American Research Group	March 29 – April 2, 2007	Rudy Giuliani 25%, John McCain 23%, Fred Thompson 10%, Mitt Romney 9%, Newt Gingrich 8%, Tom Tancredo 7%, Sam Brownback 3%, Tommy Thompson 3%, Jim Gilmore 0%, Chuck Hagel 0%, Mike Huckabee 0%, Duncan Hunter 0%, George Pataki 0%, Ron Paul 0%, Undecided 11%

=== Connecticut ===
Connecticut Winner: John McCain
Primary Date: February 5, 2008
See also

Poll Source	Date	Highlights
Primary results Sample Size: 151,212	February 5, 2008	John McCain 52.1%, Mitt Romney 33%, Mike Huckabee 7%, Ron Paul 4%, Rudy Giuliani 1.6%, Uncommitted 1.6%, Fred Thompson 0.4%, Duncan Hunter 0.1%, Other 0.2%
Survey USA Sample Size: 333; Margin of Error: ±5.5%	February 2–3, 2008	John McCain 52%, Mitt Romney 30%, Mike Huckabee 7%, Ron Paul 6%, Other 3%, Undecided 3%
Survey USA Sample Size: 426; Margin of Error: ±4.8%	January 30–31, 2008	John McCain 53%, Mitt Romney 31%, Mike Huckabee 6%, Ron Paul 5%, Other 2%, Undecided 3%
American Research Group Sample Size: 600; Margin of Error: ±4%	January 30–31, 2008	John McCain 43%, Mitt Romney 25%, Mike Huckabee 12%, Ron Paul 1%, Other 3%, Undecided 16%
Rasmussen Reports Sample Size: 492; Margin of Error: ±4%	January 27, 2008	John McCain 42%, Mitt Romney 26%, Rudy Giuliani 12%, Mike Huckabee 8%, Ron Paul 4%, Other 5%, Undecided 3%
The Courant/CSRA Sample Size: 401; Margin of Error: ±5%	January 9–17, 2008	John McCain 39%, Rudy Giuliani 16%, Mitt Romney 11%, Mike Huckabee 8%, Fred Thompson 6%, Ron Paul 2%, Undecided 17%
Quinnipiac University	November 1–5, 2007	Rudy Giuliani 41%, Mitt Romney 13%, John McCain 12%, Fred Thompson 7%, Mike Huckabee 4%, Ron Paul 3%, Duncan Hunter 1%, Tom Tancredo -, Someone else 2%, Wouldn't vote 5%, Undecided 13%
Quinnipiac University	Oct 9–15, 2007	Rudy Giuliani 42%, John McCain 14%, Fred Thompson 10%, Mitt Romney 9%, Ron Paul 3%, Mike Huckabee 2%, Duncan Hunter -, Sam Brownback -, Tom Tancredo -, Someone else 1%, Wouldn't vote 4%, Undecided 15%
Quinnipiac University	May 2–7, 2007	Rudy Giuliani 36%, John McCain 15%, Mitt Romney 9%, Fred Thompson 7%, Newt Gingrich 5%, Ron Paul 2%, George Pataki 1%, Tommy Thompson 1%, Chuck Hagel -, Duncan Hunter -, Sam Brownback -, Mike Huckabee -, Jim Gilmore -, Tom Tancredo -, Someone else 3%, Wouldn't vote 3%, Undecided 17%
Quinnipiac University	Feb 9–12, 2007	Rudy Giuliani 43%, John McCain 27%, Newt Gingrich 5%, Mitt Romney 4%, Chuck Hagel 2%, Duncan Hunter 1%, Sam Brownback 1%, Mike Huckabee 1%, Tommy Thompson 0%, Jim Gilmore 0%, George Pataki 0%, Tom Tancredo 0%, Someone else 3%, Wouldn't vote 0%, Undecided 12%
American Research Group	Feb 2–6, 2007	Rudy Giuliani 32%, John McCain 21%, Mitt Romney 14%, Newt Gingrich 11%, Sam Brownback 2%, Chuck Hagel 1%, Mike Huckabee 1%, George Pataki 1%, Tom Tancredo 1%, Undecided 16%

=== Delaware ===
Delaware Winner: John McCain
Primary Date: February 5, 2008

Poll Source	Date	Highlights
Primary results Sampling Size: 50,237	February 5, 2008	John McCain 45%, Mitt Romney 32.5%, Mike Huckabee 15.3%, Ron Paul 4.2%, Rudy Giuliani 2.5%, Tom Tancredo 0.3%
American Research Group Sampling Size: 600; Margin of Error: ±4%	January 31 – February 1, 2008	John McCain 41%, Mitt Romney 35%, Mike Huckabee 7%, Ron Paul 5%, Other 2%, Undecided 10%

=== District of Columbia ===
District of Columbia Winner: John McCain
Primary Date: February 12, 2008

Poll Source	Date	Highlights
Primary results Sampling Size: 5,801	February 12, 2008	John McCain 67.7%, Mike Huckabee 16.6%, Ron Paul 8.1%, Mitt Romney 6%, Rudy Giuliani 1.6%

=== Florida ===
Florida Winner: John McCain
Primary Date: January 29, 2008

See also

Poll Source	Date	Highlights
Primary results Sampling Size: 1,925,728	January 29, 2008	John McCain 36%, Mitt Romney 31.1%, Rudy Giuliani 14.6%, Mike Huckabee 13.5%, Ron Paul 3.2%, Fred Thompson 1.2%, Duncan Hunter .1%, Tom Tancredo .1%, Other .2%
Insider Advantage; Sampling Size: 813; Margin of Error: ±3.5%	January 28, 2008	John McCain 31%, Mitt Romney 30%, Mike Huckabee 15%, Rudy Giuliani 13%, Ron Paul 2%, Other 2%, Undecided 7%
Mitchell Interactive Sampling Size: 964; Margin of Error: ±3.16%	January 27–28, 2008	Mitt Romney 34%, John McCain 32%, Rudy Giuliani 13%, Mike Huckabee 10%, Ron Paul 3%, Undecided 7%
Reuters/C-SPAN/Zogby Sampling Size: 941; Margin of Error: ±3.3%	January 27–28, 2008	John McCain 35%, Mitt Romney 31%, Rudy Giuliani 13%, Mike Huckabee 13%, Undecided 5%
Survey USA Sampling Size: 979; Margin of Error: ±3.2%	January 27–28, 2008	John McCain 32%, Mitt Romney 31%, Rudy Giuliani 15%, Mike Huckabee 13%, Ron Paul 6%, Other 1%, Undecided 2%
Insider Advantage Sampling Size: 789; Margin of Error: ±3.5%	January 27, 2008	John McCain 28%, Mitt Romney 27%, Rudy Giuliani 16%, Mike Huckabee 13%, Ron Paul 4%, Other 3%, Undecided 9%
Survey USA Sampling Size: 608; Margin of Error: ±4.1%	January 27, 2008	Mitt Romney 32%, John McCain 31%, Rudy Giuliani 16%, Mike Huckabee 13%, Ron Paul 5%, Other 1%, Undecided 2%
Rasmussen Reports; Sampling Size: 578; Margin of Error: ±4%	January 27, 2008	Mitt Romney 31%, John McCain 31%, Rudy Giuliani 16%, Mike Huckabee 11%, Ron Paul 4%, Other 4%
Reuters/C-SPAN/Zogby Sampling Size: 818; Margin of Error: ±3.4%	January 25–27, 2008	John McCain 33%, Mitt Romney 30%, Rudy Giuliani 14%, Mike Huckabee 11%, Ron Paul 2%, Undecided 8%
Suffolk University Sampling Size: 400; Margin of Error: ±5%	January 25–27, 2008	John McCain 30%, Mitt Romney 27%, Rudy Giuliani 13%, Mike Huckabee 11%, Ron Paul 4%, Alan Keyes 1%, Undecided 16%
Strategic Vision (note) Sampling Size: 600; Margin of Error: ±4.5%	January 25–27, 2008	John McCain 27%, Mitt Romney 26%, Rudy Giuliani 17%, Mike Huckabee 15%, Ron Paul 5%, Undecided 10%
Quinnipiac University Sampling Size: 585; Margin of Error: ±4.1%	January 24–27, 2008	John McCain 32%, Mitt Romney 31%, Rudy Giuliani 14%, Mike Huckabee 13%, Ron Paul 3%, Other 1%, Undecided 7%
Insider Advantage Sampling Size: 657; Margin of Error: ±3%	January 26, 2008	Mitt Romney 25%, John McCain 25%, Rudy Giuliani 17%, Mike Huckabee 17%, Ron Paul 6%, Other 3%, Undecided 7%
Rasmussen Reports Sampling Size: 500; Margin of Error: ±4%	January 26, 2008	Mitt Romney 33%, John McCain 27%, Rudy Giuliani 18%, Mike Huckabee 12%, Ron Paul 2%, Other 5%, Undecided 13%
Insider Advantage Sampling Size: 692; Margin of Error: ±4%	January 25, 2008	Mitt Romney 26%, John McCain 24%, Rudy Giuliani 16%, Mike Huckabee 15%, Ron Paul 7%, Other 4%, Undecided 8%
Reuters/C-SPAN/Zogby Sampling Size: 814; Margin of Error: ±3.4%	January 24–26, 2008	John McCain 30%, Mitt Romney 30%, Mike Huckabee 14%, Rudy Giuliani 13%, Ron Paul 3%, Undecided 9%
Reuters/C-SPAN/Zogby Sampling Size: 814; Margin of Error: ±3.4%	January 23–25, 2008	John McCain 31%, Mitt Romney 28%, Rudy Giuliani 15%, Mike Huckabee 10%, Ron Paul 5%, Other 2%, Undecided 9%
Insider Advantage Sampling Size: 420; Margin of Error: ±4.8%	January 24, 2008	John McCain 23.3%, Mitt Romney 23.2%, Rudy Giuliani 15.9%, Mike Huckabee 13.1%, Ron Paul 6.5%, Other 8.3%, Undecided 9.7%
Survey USA Sampling Size: 550; Margin of Error: ±4.3%	January 23–24, 2008	John McCain 30%, Mitt Romney 28%, Rudy Giuliani 18%, Mike Huckabee 14%, Ron Paul 6%, Other 2%, Undecided 3%
Insider Advantage Sampling Size: 501; Margin of Error: ±4.4%	January 23, 2008	John McCain 23%, Mitt Romney 22%, Rudy Giuliani 18%, Mike Huckabee 16%, Ron Paul 4%, Other 7%, Undecided 10%
Rasmussen Reports Sampling Size: 675; Margin of Error: ±4%	January 23, 2008	Mitt Romney 27%, John McCain 23%, Rudy Giuliani 20%, Mike Huckabee 15%, Ron Paul 4%, Other 6%, Undecided 4%
Mason Dixon Sampling Size: 400; Margin of Error: ±5%	January 22–23, 2008	Mitt Romney 30%, John McCain 26%, Rudy Giuliani 18%, Mike Huckabee 15%, Undecided 10%
Public Policy Polling Sampling Size: 807; Margin of Error: ±3.5%	January 22, 2008	Mitt Romney 28%, John McCain 25%, Rudy Giuliani 19%, Mike Huckabee 15%, Ron Paul 5%, Undecided 8%
Strategic Vision (note) Sampling Size: 1450; Margin of Error: ±3%	January 20–22, 2008	John McCain 25%, Rudy Giuliani 22%, Mitt Romney 20%, Mike Huckabee 18%, Fred Thompson 6%, Ron Paul 5%, Undecided 4%
St. Petersburg Times Sampling Size: 400; Margin of Error: ±5.1%	January 20–22, 2008	John McCain 25%, Mitt Romney 23%, Mike Huckabee 15%, Rudy Giuliani 15%, Fred Thompson 4%, Ron Paul 3%, Duncan Hunter 1%, Alan Keyes 1%, Tom Tancredo 1%, Undecided 13%
Insider Advantage Sampling Size: 512; Margin of Error: ±4.4%	January 20–21, 2008	Mitt Romney 24%, Rudy Giuliani 19%, John McCain 18%, Mike Huckabee 12%, Ron Paul 7%, Other 5%, Undecided 15%
American Research Group Sampling Size: 600; Margin of Error: ±4%	January 20–21, 2008	John McCain 29%, Mitt Romney 22%, Mike Huckabee 17%, Rudy Giuliani 16%, Fred Thompson 6%, Ron Paul 6%, Alan Keyes 1%, Undecided 3%
Survey USA Sampling Size: 518; Margin of Error: ±4.4%	January 20, 2008	John McCain 25%, Rudy Giuliani 20%, Mitt Romney 19%, Mike Huckabee 14%, Fred Thompson 7%, Ron Paul 7%, Other 1%, Undecided 7%
Rasmussen Reports Sampling Size: 754; Margin of Error: ±4%	January 20, 2008	Mitt Romney 25%, John McCain 20%, Rudy Giuliani 19%, Mike Huckabee 13%, Fred Thompson 12%, Ron Paul 5%, Undecided 6%
Insider Advantage Sampling Size: 446; Margin of Error: ±4.5%	January 15–16, 2008	Rudy Giuliani 21%, John McCain 20%, Mitt Romney 20%, Mike Huckabee 13%, Fred Thompson 7%, Ron Paul 6%, Undecided 13%
Research 2000 Sampling Size: 500; Margin of Error: ±4.5%	January 14–16, 2008	John McCain 26%, Rudy Giuliani 22%, Mike Huckabee 17%, Mitt Romney 16%, Fred Thompson 7%, Ron Paul 5%, Other 2%, Undecided 5%
Strategic Vision (note) Sampling Size: 577; Margin of Error: ±3%	January 11–13, 2008	John McCain 27%, Mike Huckabee 20%, Rudy Giuliani 18%, Mitt Romney 17%, Fred Thompson 10%, Ron Paul 5%, Duncan Hunter 1%, Undecided 2%
Survey USA Sampling Size: 542; Margin of Error: ±4.3%	January 11–13, 2008	John McCain 25%, Rudy Giuliani 23%, Mitt Romney 18%, Mike Huckabee 18%, Fred Thompson 9%, Ron Paul 4%, Other 2%, Undecided 3%
Quinnipiac University Sampling Size: 419; Margin of Error: ±4.8%	January 9–13, 2008	John McCain 22%, Rudy Giuliani 20%, Mitt Romney 19%, Mike Huckabee 19%, Fred Thompson 7%, Ron Paul 5%, Duncan Hunter 1%, Undecided 7%
Rasmussen Reports Sampling Size: 781; Margin of Error: ±4%	January 9–12, 2008	John McCain 19%, Rudy Giuliani 18%, Mitt Romney 18%, Mike Huckabee 17%, Fred Thompson 11%, Ron Paul 5%, Some Other Candidate 2%, Undecided 10%
Survey USA Sampling Size: 502; Margin of Error: ±4.5%	January 9–10, 2008	John McCain 27%, Rudy Giuliani 19%, Mike Huckabee 17%, Mitt Romney 17%, Fred Thompson 8%, Ron Paul 5%, Other 1%, Undecided 5%
Insider Advantage Sampling Size: 340; Margin of Error: ±5.5%	January 7, 2008	Rudy Giuliani 24%, Mike Huckabee 19%, John McCain 19%, Mitt Romney 13%, Fred Thompson 8%, Ron Paul 5%, Duncan Hunter 1%, No Opinion 11%
Quinnipiac University	Dec. 12–18, 2007	Rudy Giuliani 28%, Mike Huckabee 21%, Mitt Romney 20%, John McCain 13%, Fred Thompson 8%, Ron Paul 2%
Survey USA	Dec. 15–16, 2007	Rudy Giuliani 29%, Mike Huckabee 24%, Mitt Romney 20%, John McCain 10%, Fred Thompson 8%
Strategic Vision (note)	Dec. 14–16, 2007	Rudy Giuliani 25%, Mike Huckabee 21%, John McCain 15%, Mitt Romney 13%, Fred Thompson 10%, Ron Paul 4%
Rasmussen Reports	December 13, 2007	Mike Huckabee 27%, Mitt Romney 23%, Rudy Giuliani 19%, Fred Thompson 9%, John McCain 6%, Ron Paul 4%, Undecided 8%
Datamar	Dec 9–13, 2007	Mike Huckabee 24.8%, Rudy Giuliani 21.0%, Mitt Romney 19.2%, John McCain 9.7%, Fred Thompson 9.4%, Ron Paul 4.5%, Duncan Hunter 1.6%, Tom Tancredo 1.4%, Undecided 8.3%
SurveyUSA	Dec 2–4, 2007	Rudy Giuliani 32%, Mike Huckabee 18%, Mitt Romney 15%, Fred Thompson 14%, John McCain 11%, Other 5%, Undecided 6%
Quinnipiac	November 26 – December 3, 2007	Rudy Giuliani 30%, Mitt Romney 12%, Mike Huckabee 11%, Fred Thompson 10%, John McCain 9%, Paul 4%, Hunter 1%, Tancredo 1%, Other 2%, Undecided 17%
Datamar	November 16–21, 2007	Rudy Giuliani 28.8%, Mitt Romney 15.3%, Fred Thompson 13.9%, John McCain 10.4%, Mike Huckabee 6.9%, Ron Paul 4.0%, Duncan Hunter 1.1%, Tom Tancredo 0.9%, Undecided 18.8%
Strategic Vision (note)	November 9–11, 2007	Rudy Giuliani 31%, Fred Thompson 13%, John McCain 13%, Mitt Romney 12%, Mike Huckabee 9%, Ron Paul 4%, Tom Tancredo 2%, Duncan Hunter 1%, Undecided 14%
SurveyUSA	November 2–5, 2007	Rudy Giuliani 34%, Fred Thompson 22%, Mitt Romney 17%, John McCain 10%, Mike Huckabee 8%, Other 5%, Undecided 3%
Quinnipiac	Oct 17–22, 2007	Rudy Giuliani 30%, Fred Thompson 14%, John McCain 14%, Mitt Romney 12%, Mike Huckabee 8%, Paul 1%, Sam Brownback 1%, Hunter 1%, Tancredo 1%, Other 3%, Undecided 11%
Quinnipiac	Oct 1–8, 2007	Rudy Giuliani 27%, Fred Thompson 19%, Mitt Romney 17%, John McCain 8%, Mike Huckabee 4%, Paul 2%, Sam Brownback 1%, Hunter -%, Tancredo 1%, Other 2%, Undecided 16%
InsiderAdvantage	Oct 2–3, 2007	Rudy Giuliani 29%, Fred Thompson 19%, Mitt Romney 16%, John McCain 10%, Mike Huckabee 6%, Ron Paul 3%, Sam Brownback 1%, Duncan Hunter 1%, Undecided 15%
Strategic Vision (note)	Sept 21–23, 2007	Rudy Giuliani 35%, Fred Thompson 24%, Mitt Romney 9%, John McCain 6%, Mike Huckabee 5%, Newt Gingrich 4%, Ron Paul 3%, Tom Tancredo 2%, Sam Brownback 1%, Duncan Hunter 1%, Undecided 10%
Rasmussen	September 19, 2007	Rudy Giuliani 29%, Fred Thompson 23%, John McCain 12%, Mitt Romney 11%, Mike Huckabee 3%, Others 2%
Mason-Dixon	Sept 17–18, 2007	Rudy Giuliani 24%, Fred Thompson 23%, Mitt Romney 13%, John McCain 9%, Mike Huckabee 6%, Ron Paul 1%, Duncan Hunter 1%, Tom Tancredo 1%, Sam Brownback <1%, Undecided 22%
InsiderAdvantage	Sept 17–18, 2007	Rudy Giuliani 23.9%, Fred Thompson 23.0%, Mitt Romney 11.9%, John McCain 11.2%, Mike Huckabee 4.7%, Ron Paul 2.5%, Sam Brownback 2.2%, Duncan Hunter 1.1%, Undecided 19.4%
American Research Group	Sep 15–18, 2007	Rudy Giuliani 26%, John McCain 18%, Fred Thompson 16%, Mitt Romney 14%, Newt Gingrich 4%, Ron Paul 3%, Mike Huckabee 3%, Sam Brownback 1%, Duncan Hunter 1%, Tom Tancredo -, Undecided 14%
Insider Advantage	Sep 6–10, 2007	Fred Thompson 27%, Rudy Giuliani 21%, John McCain 9%, Mitt Romney 8%, Mike Huckabee 4%, Sam Brownback 3%, Ron Paul 2%, Duncan Hunter 1%, Undecided 25%
Quinnipiac	Sep 3–9, 2007	Rudy Giuliani 28%, Fred Thompson 17%, Mitt Romney 11%, John McCain 10%, Newt Gingrich 6%, Mike Huckabee 2%, Paul 2%, Sam Brownback -%, Hunter -%, Tancredo -%, Other 4%, Undecided 18%
Rasmussen (Likely Primary Voters); Sampling Size: 689	August 13, 2007	Rudy Giuliani 30%, Fred Thompson 17%, Mitt Romney 15%, John McCain 7%, Mike Huckabee 5%
Strategic Vision (R)	Aug 10–12, 2007	Rudy Giuliani 34%, Fred Thompson 18%, Mitt Romney 10%, John McCain 8%, Newt Gingrich 3%, Mike Huckabee 3%, Tom Tancredo 3%, Ron Paul 2%, Brownback 1%, T. Thompson 1%, Hunter 1%, Undecided 16%
Quinnipiac	July 30 – August 6, 2007	Rudy Giuliani 26%, Fred Thompson 19%, John McCain 11%, Mitt Romney 9%, Newt Gingrich 6%, Sam Brownback 2% Mike Huckabee 2%, T. Thompson 1%, Gilmore 0%, Hunter 0%, Paul 0%, Tancredo 0%, Other 3%, Undecided 18%
Mason-Dixon	July 23–26, 2007	Rudy Giuliani 21%, Fred Thompson 18%, John McCain 11%, Mitt Romney 7%, Mike Huckabee 5%, Tommy Thompson 2%, Sam Brownback 1%, Newt Gingrich 1% (write-in), Undecided 34%
Rasmussen	July 18–19, 2007	Rudy Giuliani 22%, Fred Thompson 21%, John McCain 13%, Mitt Romney 13%, Undecided 27%
Quinnipiac	July 12–16, 2007	Rudy Giuliani 30%, Fred Thompson 18%, John McCain 10%, Mitt Romney 9%, Newt Gingrich 5%
American Research Group	July 12–15, 2007	Rudy Giuliani 33%, Fred Thompson 27%, Mitt Romney 12%, John McCain 7%, Gingrich 3%, Brownback 1%, Hagel 1%, Huckabee 1%, Paul 1%, Tommy Thompson 1%, Gilmore -, Hunter -, Pataki -, Tancredo -, Undecided 13%
Quinnipiac	June 18–22, 2007	Rudy Giuliani 27%, Fred Thompson 21%, John McCain 13%, Newt Gingrich 7%, Mitt Romney 6%, Ron Paul 2%, Mike Huckabee 1%, Tom Tancredo 1%, Tommy Thompson 1%, Sam Brownback -, Jim Gilmore -, Duncan Hunter -, Someone Else 2%, Wouldn't Vote 3%, Unsure 18%
Strategic Vision (R)	June 15–17, 2007	Rudy Giuliani 30%, Fred Thompson 24%, John McCain 11%, Mitt Romney 8%, Newt Gingrich 4%, Brownback 2%, Tancredo 2%, Huckabee 2%, Paul 2%, T. Thompson 1%, Gilmore 1%, Hagel 1%, Hunter 1%, Undecided 11%
Zogby Poll	June 4–6, 2007	Rudy Giuliani 31%, John McCain 12%, Mitt Romney 12%, Fred Thompson 10%, Brownback 2%, Huckabee 2%, Hagel 1%, Paul 1%, Sandford 1%, Gilmore 0%, Tancredo 0%, Tommy Thompson 0%, Other 8%, Unsure 22%
Quinnipiac University	May 24 – June 4, 2007	Rudy Giuliani 31%, Fred Thompson 14%, John McCain 10%, Mitt Romney 8%, Newt Gingrich 7%, Brownback 1%, Hunter 1%, Tommy Thompson 1%, Gilmore -, Hagel -, Huckabee -, Pataki -, Paul -, Tancredo -, Other 3%, Don't Know 21%
Strategic Vision (R)	May 11–13, 2007	Rudy Giuliani 32%, John McCain 20%, Fred Thompson 10%, Newt Gingrich 7%, Mitt Romney 5%, Sam Brownback 3%, Tancredo 2%, Huckabee 2%, Paul 2%, Tommy Thompson 1%, Gilmore 1%, Hagel 1%, Hunter 1%, Undecided 13%
St. Petersburg Times	May 6–9, 2007	Rudy Giuliani 29%, John McCain 15%, Mitt Romney 14%, Fred Thompson 9%, Newt Gingrich 8%, Huckabee 2%, Brownback 1%, Gilmore 1%, Paul 1%, Tommy Thompson 1%, Hunter -, Other 1%, Undecided 17%
American Research Group	May 4–8, 2007	Rudy Giuliani 31%, John McCain 18%, Mitt Romney 11%, Fred Thompson 13%, Newt Gingrich 8%, Brownback 1%, Hagel 1%, Huckabee 1%, Hunter 1%, Tancredo 1%, Tommy Thompson 1%, Gilmore -, Pataki -, Paul -, Undecided 13%
Quinnipiac University	Mar 21 – 27, 2007	Rudy Giuliani 35%, John McCain 15%, Newt Gingrich 11%, Fred Thompson 6%, Mitt Romney 5%, Sam Brownback 1%, Tommy Thompson 1%, Ron Paul 1%, Mike Huckabee 0%, Duncan Hunter 0%, Tom Tancredo 0%, Jim Gilmore 0%, Chuck Hagel 0%, George Pataki 0%, Someone else 3%, Undecided 19%
Strategic Vision (note)	Mar 9 – 11, 2007	Rudy Giuliani 36%, John McCain 21%, Mitt Romney 8%, Newt Gingrich 6%, Sam Brownback 4%, Tom Tancredo 4%, Mike Huckabee 2%, Tommy Thompson 2%, Duncan Hunter 1%, Jim Gilmore 0%, Chuck Hagel 1%, Undecided 14%
Quinnipiac University	Feb 25 – March 1, 2007	Rudy Giuliani 38%, John McCain 18%, Newt Gingrich 14%, Mitt Romney 6%, Sam Brownback 1%, Mike Huckabee 1%, Duncan Hunter 1%, Tom Tancredo 1%, Tommy Thompson 1%, Jim Gilmore 0%, Chuck Hagel 0%, Ron Paul 0%, George Pataki 0%, Someone else 2%, Undecided 16%
Elon University	Feb 18–22, 2007	Rudy Giuliani 29.5%, John McCain 11.5%, Mitt Romney 4.9%, Newt Gingrich 1.6%, Don't Know/Too Early to Tell 52.5%
Quinnipiac University	January 29 – February 4, 2007	Rudy Giuliani 29%, John McCain 23%, Newt Gingrich 14%, Mitt Romney 6%, George Pataki 2%, Tommy Thompson 2%, Sam Brownback 1%, Chuck Hagel 0%, Duncan Hunter 0%, Mike Huckabee 0%, Jim Gilmore 0%, Tom Tancredo 0%, Someone else 3%, Wouldn't vote 2%, Undecided 19%
American Research Group	January 4–7, 2007	Rudy Giuliani 30%, Newt Gingrich 16%, John McCain 15%, Chuck Hagel 2%, Mitt Romney 2%, Mike Huckabee 1%, George Pataki 1%, Undecided 32%

=== Georgia ===
Georgia Winner: Mike Huckabee
Primary Date: February 5, 2008
See also

Poll Source	Date	Highlights
Primary results Sampling Size: 960,372	February 5, 2008	Mike Huckabee 34%, John McCain 31.6%, Mitt Romney 30.2%, Ron Paul 2.9%, Rudy Giuliani 0.7%, Fred Thompson 0.4%, Duncan Hunter 0.1%, Others 0.2%
InsiderAdvantage Sampling Size: 1212	February 4, 2008	Mike Huckabee 32.4%, John McCain 31.5%, Mitt Romney 29.2%, Ron Paul 2.7%, Other .8%, Undecided 3.4%
Strategic Vision (note) Sampling Size: 600; Margin of Error: ±4.5%	February 1–3, 2008	John McCain 31%, Mitt Romney 29%, Mike Huckabee 26%, Ron Paul 5%, Undecided 9%
Rasmussen Reports Sampling Size: 783; Margin of Error: ±4%	February 2, 2008	John McCain 31%, Mitt Romney 29%, Mike Huckabee 28%, Ron Paul 6%, Undecided 6%
InsiderAdvantage Sampling Size: 388	February 2, 2008	Mitt Romney 30.1%, John McCain 28.9%, Mike Huckabee 27.9%, Ron Paul 2.4%, Other 4%, Undecided 10.3%
Public Policy Polling Sampling Size: 862; Margin of Error: ±3.3%	January 30, 2008	Mitt Romney 32%, John McCain 31%, Mike Huckabee 24%, Ron Paul 3%, Undecided 10%
McClatchy/MSNBC/Mason Dixon Sampling Size: 400; Margin of Error: ±4.6%	January 30, 2008	John McCain 33%, Mitt Romney 27%, Mike Huckabee 18%, Ron Paul 4%, Undecided 17%
InsiderAdvantage Sampling Size: 362	January 30, 2008	John McCain 35%, Mike Huckabee 24%, Mitt Romney 24%, Ron Paul 5%, Other 1%, Undecided 11%
Rasmussen Reports Sampling Size: 768; Margin of Error: ±4%	January 22, 2008	Mike Huckabee 34%, John McCain 19%, Mitt Romney 16%, Ron Paul 12%, Rudy Giuliani 11%, Undecided 8%
Mason Dixon/AJC Sampling Size: 400; Margin of Error: ±5%	January 7–10, 2008	Mike Huckabee 31%, John McCain 18%, Mitt Romney 14%, Rudy Giuliani 9%, Fred Thompson 8%
Insider Advantage (R); Margin of Error: +/- 4% Sample Size: 823	Dec 17 – 18, 2007	Mike Huckabee 36%, Rudy Giuliani 14%, Mitt Romney 12%, Fred Thompson 10%, John McCain 10%, Ron Paul 4%, Duncan Hunter 2%, Tom Tancredo 1%, Undecided 11%
Stragetic Vision (R)	Dec 7 – 9, 2007	Mike Huckabee 23%, Fred Thompson 20%, Rudy Giuliani 17%, John McCain 11%, Mitt Romney 10%, Ron Paul 4%, Tom Tancredo 2%, Duncan Hunter 1%, Undecided 12%
Strategic Vision (R)	Oct 19 – 21, 2007	Fred Thompson 39%, Rudy Giuliani 20%, John McCain 9%, Mike Huckabee 7%, Mitt Romney 6%, Ron Paul 3%, Tom Tancredo 2%, Duncan Hunter 1%, Undecided 13%
Strategic Vision (R)	Sep 7 – 9, 2007	Fred Thompson 32%, Rudy Giuliani 17%, Newt Gingrich 9%, John McCain 8%, Mitt Romney 6%, Mike Huckabee 6%, Sam Brownback 2%, Tom Tancredo 2%, Ron Paul 2%, Duncan Hunter 1%, Undecided 15%
American Research Group Margin of Error: +/- 4% Sample Size: 600 (509 R, 91 I)	Aug 2–6, 2007	Fred Thompson 27%, Rudy Giuliani 20%, Mitt Romney 14%, Newt Gingrich 13%, John McCain 7%, Mike Huckabee 3%, Sam Brownback 2%, Ron Paul 2%, T. Thompson 1%, Hunter -, Tancredo -, Undecided 12%
Strategic Vision (R)	June 27, 2007	Fred Thompson 25%, Rudy Giuliani 20%, John McCain 11%, Newt Gingrich 7%, Mitt Romney 6%, Mike Huckabee 5%, Sam Brownback 4%, Tom Tancredo 2%, Ron Paul 2%, Tommy Thompson 1%, Chuck Hagel 1%, Jim Gilmore 1%, Duncan Hunter 1%, Undecided 14%
Strategic Vision (R)	April 11, 2007	Rudy Giuliani 23%, John McCain 17%, Fred Thompson 12%, Newt Gingrich 10%, Mitt Romney 5%, Tom Tancredo 3%, Sam Brownback 3%, Tommy Thompson 3%, Mike Huckabee 2%, Chuck Hagel 1%, Jim Gilmore 1%, Ron Paul 1%, Duncan Hunter 1%, Undecided 18%
Insider Advantage	Mar 23–25, 2007	Newt Gingrich 25%, Rudy Giuliani 24%, John McCain 13%, Fred Thompson 9%, Mitt Romney 7%, Undecided 20%, Other 1%
Elon University Sample Size: 47	Feb 18–22, 2007	Rudy Giuliani 25.5%, John McCain 12.8%, Newt Gingrich 2.1%, Bill Frist 2.1%, Too Early to Know/Undecided 57.4%
Strategic Vision (note)	January 12–14, 2007	Rudy Giuliani 27%, John McCain 24%, Newt Gingrich 12%, Mitt Romney 7%, Mike Huckabee 3%, Sam Brownback 2%, Tom Tancredo 2%, Tommy Thompson 2%, George Pataki 1%, Chuck Hagel 1%, Jim Gilmore 1%, Duncan Hunter 0%, Undecided 18%

=== Idaho ===
Idaho Winner: John McCain
Primary Date: May 27, 2008

Poll Source	Date	Highlights
Primary results	May 27, 2008	John McCain 69.7%, Ron Paul 23.7%, None of the Names Shown 6.6%
Greg Smith & Associates	July 11–13, 2007	Mitt Romney 38%, Rudy Giuliani 20%, Fred Thompson 18%, John McCain 14%, Other 3%, Undecided 7%

=== Illinois ===
Illinois Winner: John McCain
Primary Date: February 5, 2008
See also

Poll Source	Date	Highlights
Primary results Sampling Size: 895,247	February 5, 2008	John McCain 47.4%, Mitt Romney 28.7%, Mike Huckabee 16.5%, Ron Paul 5%, Rudy Giuliani 1.3%, Fred Thompson 0.8%, Others 0.3%
American Research Group Sampling Size: 600; Margin of Error: ±4.0%	January 30–31, 2008	John McCain 48%, Mitt Romney 34%, Mike Huckabee 3%, Ron Paul 3%, Undecided 9%, Other 3%
Chicago Tribune/WGN TV Sampling Size: 500; Margin of Error: ±4.4%	January 29–31, 2008	John McCain 43%, Mitt Romney 20%, Mike Huckabee 15%, Ron Paul 4%, Undecided 17%
Rasmussen Sampling Size: 504; Margin of Error: ±4%	January 29, 2008	John McCain 34%, Mitt Romney 26%, Mike Huckabee 16%, Ron Paul 10%
Research 2000 Sampling Size: 500; Margin of Error: ±4.5%	January 21–24, 2008	John McCain 31%, Mitt Romney 20%, Rudy Giuliani 13%, Mike Huckabee 11%, Ron Paul 7%, Undecided 18%
Chicago Tribune Margin of Error: ±4.4% Sample Size: 500	December 9–13, 2007	Rudy Giuliani 23%, Mike Huckabee 21%, Mitt Romney 14%, John McCain 12%, Fred Thompson 11%, Ron Paul 3%, Tom Tancredo 1%, Other 1%, Undecided 14%
American Research Group Margin of Error: +/- 4% Sample Size: 600 (522 R, 78 I)	July 6–9, 2007	Rudy Giuliani 30%, Fred Thompson 21%, John McCain 12%, Mitt Romney 11%, Newt Gingrich 5%, Mike Huckabee 2%, Sam Brownback 1%, Chuck Hagel 1%, Ron Paul 1%, Tom Tancredo 1%, Tommy Thompson 1%, Gilmore 0%, Duncan Hunter 0%, Pataki 0%, Undecided 14%
Capitol Fax/Ask Illinois	April 27–30, 2007	John McCain 26.1%, Rudy Giuliani 25.7%, Fred Thompson 17.7%, Mitt Romney 10.2%, Tommy Thompson 3.3%, Undecided/Other 17%
American Research Group	January 11–14, 2007	Rudy Giuliani 33%, John McCain 24%, Mitt Romney 12%, Newt Gingrich 8%, Sam Brownback 4%, Tommy Thompson 4%, Chuck Hagel 3%, Duncan Hunter 1%, Gilmore 0%, Mike Huckabee 0%, Pataki 0%, Undecided 11%

=== Iowa ===
Iowa Winner: Mike Huckabee
Caucus Date: January 3, 2008

See also

Poll Source	Date	Highlights
Caucus results Sampling Size: 118,696	January 3, 2008	Mike Huckabee 34.4%, Mitt Romney 25.2%, Fred Thompson 13.4%, John McCain 13.1%, Ron Paul 10%, Rudy Giuliani 3.5%, Duncan Hunter .4%
Insider Advantage	January 1, 2008	Mike Huckabee 30%, Mitt Romney 24.1%, Fred Thompson 11.3%, John McCain 10.9%, Ron Paul 7.1%, Rudy Giuliani 4.8%, Duncan Hunter 1.3%, Undecided 10.5%
American Research Group Sample Size: 600; Margin of Error: ±4%	December 31, 2007 – January 2, 2007	Mike Huckabee 29%, Mitt Romney 24%, Fred Thompson 13%, John McCain 11%, Rudy Giuliani 8%, Ron Paul 6%, Duncan Hunter 4%, Alan Keyes 1%, Undecided 4%
Zogby International Sample Size: 914; Margin of Error: ±3.3%	December 30, 2007 – January 2, 2008	Mike Huckabee 31%, Mitt Romney 25%, Fred Thompson 11%, John McCain 10%, Ron Paul 10%, Rudy Giuliani 6%, Duncan Hunter 1%, Undecided 6%
Zogby International Sample Size: 882; Margin of Error: ±3.3%	December 29, 2007 – January 1, 2008	Mike Huckabee 28%, Mitt Romney 26%, John McCain 12%, Fred Thompson 12%, Ron Paul 9%, Rudy Giuliani 7%, Duncan Hunter 1%, Undecided 6%
Zogby International Sample Size: 903; Margin of Error: ±3.3%	December 28–31, 2007	Mike Huckabee 29%, Mitt Romney 25%, John McCain 12%, Fred Thompson 10%, Rudy Giuliani 8%, Ron Paul 7%, Duncan Hunter 1%, Undecided 6%
Des Moines Register Sample Size: 800; Margin of Error: ±3.5%	December 27–30, 2007	Mike Huckabee 32%, Mitt Romney 26%, John McCain 13%, Ron Paul 9%, Fred Thompson 9%, Rudy Giuliani 5%, Alan Keyes 1%, Duncan Hunter 1%, Undecided 4%
Zogby International Sample Size: 876; Margin of Error: ±3.3%	December 27–30, 2007	Mike Huckabee 29%, Mitt Romney 27%, John McCain 13%, Fred Thompson 8%, Rudy Giuliani 7%, Ron Paul 7%, Duncan Hunter 1%, Undecided 6%
CNN/Opinion Research Corp. Sample Size: 373; Margin of Error: ±5%	December 26–30, 2007	Mitt Romney 31%, Mike Huckabee 28%, Fred Thompson 13%, John McCain 10%, Rudy Giuliani 8%, Ron Paul 8%, Duncan Hunter <0.5%
Zogby International Sample Size: 867; Margin of Error: ±3.4%	December 26–29, 2007	Mike Huckabee 29%, Mitt Romney 28%, John McCain 11%, Fred Thompson 8%, Rudy Giuliani 8%, Ron Paul 8%, Duncan Hunter 1%, Undecided 6%
MSNBC/Mason-Dixon Sample Size: 400; Margin of Error: ±5%	December 26–28, 2007	Mitt Romney 27%, Mike Huckabee 23%, Fred Thompson 14%, John McCain 13%, Rudy Giuliani 5%, Ron Paul 5%, Duncan Hunter 1%, Undecided 12%
American Research Group Sample Size: 600; Margin of Error: ±4%	December 26–28, 2007	Mitt Romney 32%, Mike Huckabee 23%, John McCain 11%, Fred Thompson 7%, Rudy Giuliani 6%, Ron Paul 6%, Duncan Hunter 2%, Undecided 11%
Strategic Vision (R) Sampling Size: 600LV; Margin of Error: ± 4.5%	December 26–27, 2007	Mike Huckabee 29%, Mitt Romney 27%, Fred Thompson 15%, John McCain 14%, Rudy Giuliani 4%, Ron Paul 4%, Duncan Hunter 1%, Undecided 6%
LA Times/Bloomberg	December 20–23, 26, 2007	Mike Huckabee 37%, Mitt Romney 23%, John McCain 11%, Fred Thompson 11%, Rudy Giuliani 6%, Ron Paul 2%, Duncan Hunter 1%, Undecided 9%
American Research Group Sampling Size: 600; Margin of Error: ± 4%	December 20–23, 2007	Mike Huckabee 23%, Mitt Romney 21%, John McCain 17%, Rudy Giuliani 14%, Ron Paul 10%, Fred Thompson 3%, Duncan Hunter 2%, Alan Keyes 2%, Undecided 8%
American Research Group Sampling Size: 600; Margin of Error: ± 4%	December 16–19, 2007	Mike Huckabee 28%, John McCain 20%, Mitt Romney 17%, Rudy Giuliani 13%, Fred Thompson 5%, Ron Paul 4%, Tom Tancredo 1%, Alan Keyes 1%, Duncan Hunter -%, Undecided 11%
Rasmussen Reports Sampling Size: 496; Margin of Error: ± 4%	December 17, 2007	Mike Huckabee 28%, Mitt Romney 27%, John McCain 14%, Rudy Giuliani 8%, Fred Thompson 8%, Ron Paul 6%, Tom Tancredo 2%, Duncan Hunter 1%
Rasmussen Reports Sampling Size: 789	December 10, 2007	Mike Huckabee 39%, Mitt Romney 23%, Fred Thompson 8%, Rudy Giuliani 8%, John McCain 6%, Ron Paul 5%, Tom Tancredo 3%, Duncan Hunter 1%
Newsweek Sampling Size: 540; Margin of Error: ± 3%	December 5–6, 2007	Mike Huckabee 39%, Mitt Romney 17%, Fred Thompson 10%, Rudy Giuliani 9%, Ron Paul 8%, John McCain 6%, Tom Tancredo 2%, Duncan Hunter 0%, Other 1%, Undecided 8%
Mason-Dixon Sampling Size: 400; Margin of Error: ± 5%	December 3–6, 2007	Mike Huckabee 32%, Mitt Romney 20%, Fred Thompson 11%, John McCain 7%, Rudy Giuliani 5%, Ron Paul 2%, Duncan Hunter 1%, Alan Keyes 1%, Undecided 19%
American Research Group Sampling Size: 600; Margin of Error: ± 4%	November 26–29, 2007	Mitt Romney 28%, Mike Huckabee 27%, Fred Thompson 14%, Rudy Giuliani 9%, John McCain 9%, Ron Paul 3%, Tom Tancredo 1%, Duncan Hunter -%, Alan Keyes -%, Undecided 9%
Des Moines Register	November 25–28, 2007	Mike Huckabee 29%, Mitt Romney 24%, Rudy Giuliani 13%, Fred Thompson 9%, John McCain 7%, Ron Paul 7%, Tom Tancredo 6%, Duncan Hunter 1%, John Cox -%, Alan Keyes -%, Undecided 4%
Rasmussen	November 26–27, 2007	Mike Huckabee 28%, Mitt Romney 25%, Rudy Giuliani 12%, Fred Thompson 11%, Ron Paul 5%, John McCain 4%
Pew Research Center Sampling Size: 264; Margin of Error: ±7%	November 7–25, 2007	Mitt Romney 25%, Mike Huckabee 24%, Rudy Giuliani 14%, Fred Thompson 12%, John McCain 5%, Ron Paul 5%, Tom Tancredo 3%, Duncan Hunter 1%, Other 10%
ABC News/Wash Post	November 14–18, 2007	Mitt Romney 28%, Mike Huckabee 24%, Fred Thompson 15%, Rudy Giuliani 13%, John McCain 6%, Ron Paul 6%, Tom Tancredo 2%, Duncan Hunter 1%, Undecided 4%
KCCI Des Moines Sampling Size: 600; Margin of Error: ± 4%	November 12–14, 2007	Mitt Romney 27%, Mike Huckabee 18%, Rudy Giuliani 16%, Fred Thompson 10%, John McCain 6%, Ron Paul 5%, Tom Tancredo 2%, Duncan Hunter 1%, Undecided 15%
American Research Group Sampling Size: 600; Margin of Error: ± 4%	November 10–14, 2007	Mitt Romney 26%, Mike Huckabee 24%, Rudy Giuliani 11%, Fred Thompson 11%, John McCain 10%, Ron Paul 3%, Tom Tancredo 1%, Duncan Hunter 1%, Keyes -, Undecided 13%
Rasmussen Reports Sampling Size: 825; Margin of Error: ± 3.5%	November 9–12, 2007	Mitt Romney 29%, Mike Huckabee 16%, Rudy Giuliani 15%, Fred Thompson 14%, John McCain 6%, Ron Paul 4%, Tom Tancredo 4%, Duncan Hunter 2%, Undecided 9%
CBS News/New York Times Sampling Size: 1273; Margin of Error: +/- 5%	November 2–11, 2007	Mitt Romney 27%, Mike Huckabee 21%, Rudy Giuliani 15%, Fred Thompson 9%, Ron Paul 4%, John McCain 4%, Tom Tancredo 3%, Duncan Hunter 2%, Undecided 14%
Zogby Sampling Size: 410; Margin of Error: +/- 5.0%	November 6–7, 2007	Mitt Romney 31%, Mike Huckabee 15%, Rudy Giuliani 11%, Fred Thompson 10%, John McCain 8%, Ron Paul 4%, Tom Tancredo 3%, Duncan Hunter 1%, Other 1%, Not Sure 16%
American Research Group	October 26–29, 2007	Mitt Romney 27%, Mike Huckabee 19%, Rudy Giuliani 16%, John McCain 14%, Fred Thompson 8%, Tom Tancredo 2%, Ron Paul 1%, Duncan Hunter -%, Alan Keyes -%, Undecided 13%
University of Iowa Hawkeye Poll Margin of Error: +/- 5.8% Sampling Size: 285	October 17–24, 2007	Mitt Romney 36.2%, Rudy Giuliani 13.1%, Mike Huckabee 12.8%, Fred Thompson 11.4%, John McCain 6.0%, Tom Tancredo 2.2%, Others 3.5%, Undecided 14.9%
Rasmussen Reports	October 10 & 14, 2007	Mitt Romney 25%, Fred Thompson 19%, Mike Huckabee 18%, Rudy Giuliani 13%, John McCain 6%, Sam Brownback 3%, Ron Paul 2%, Tom Tancredo 2%, Duncan Hunter 1%, Undecided 11%
InsiderAdvantage	October 2–3, 2007	Mitt Romney 24%, Rudy Giuliani 16%, Fred Thompson 13%, Mike Huckabee 13%, John McCain 10%, Sam Brownback 5%, Ron Paul 4%, Duncan Hunter 2%, Undecided 13%
Des Moines Register	October 1–3, 2007	Mitt Romney 29%, Fred Thompson 18%, Mike Huckabee 12%, Rudy Giuliani 11%, John McCain 7%, Tom Tancredo 5%, Ron Paul 4%, Sam Brownback 2%, Alan Keyes 2%, Duncan Hunter 1%, John Cox -, Undecided 9%
American Research Group	September 26–29, 2007	Mitt Romney 22%, Rudy Giuliani 21%, Fred Thompson 16%, John McCain 11%, Newt Gingrich 5%, Mike Huckabee 4%, Ron Paul 2%, Duncan Hunter 2%, Sam Brownback 2%, Alan Keyes 1%, Tom Tancredo 1%, Undecided 13%
Newsweek (All Republican voters)	September 26–27, 2007	Mitt Romney 25%, Fred Thompson 16%, Rudy Giuliani 15%, John McCain 7%, Mike Huckabee 6%, Tom Tancredo 3%, Sam Brownback 3%, Ron Paul 2%, Duncan Hunter 1%, Undecided 21%
Newsweek (Likely caucus-goers)	September 26–27, 2007	Mitt Romney 24%, Fred Thompson 16%, Rudy Giuliani 13%, Mike Huckabee 12%, John McCain 9%, Ron Paul 5%, Tom Tancredo 3%, Sam Brownback 2%, Duncan Hunter 1%, Undecided 15%
Los Angeles Times/Bloomberg Poll	September 6–10, 2007	Mitt Romney 28%, Rudy Giuliani 16%, Fred Thompson 16%, Mike Huckabee 8%, John McCain 7%, Tom Tancredo 3%, Ron Paul 2%, Sam Brownback 2%, Duncan Hunter 1%, Undecided 15%
American Research Group	August 26–29, 2007	Mitt Romney 27%, Rudy Giuliani 17%, Mike Huckabee 14%, Fred Thompson 13%, Newt Gingrich 7%, John McCain 5%, Hunter 1%, Paul 1%, Brownback -, Tancredo -, Undecided 15%
McLaughlin & Associates	August 20–21, 2007	Mitt Romney 35%, Rudy Giuliani 12%, Fred Thompson 11%, Mike Huckabee 11%, Tom Tancredo 9%, John McCain 7%, Sam Brownback 2%, Ron Paul 1%, Duncan Hunter 1%, Firm Undecided 10%
University of Iowa (Most Likely Caucus Goers)	July 29 – August 5, 2007	Mitt Romney 27.8%, Rudy Giuliani 11.7%, Fred Thompson 7.6%, Tom Tancredo 5.4%, Sam Brownback 4%, John McCain 3.1%, Mike Huckabee 1.8%, Other 11.2%, Undecided 27.4%
ABC News/Washington Post	July 26–31, 2007	Mitt Romney 25%, Rudy Giuliani 14%, Fred Thompson 13%, Mike Huckabee 8%, John McCain 8%, Sam Brownback 5%, Tom Tancredo 5%, Newt Gingrich 4%, Tommy Thompson 4%, Ron Paul 2%, Duncan Hunter 1%, Other (vol) 1%, None of the Above 3%, Undecided 7%
American Research Group Margin of Error: +/- 4% Sampling Size: 600	July 26–30, 2007	Rudy Giuliani 22%, Mitt Romney 21%, John McCain 17%, Fred Thompson 13%, Newt Gingrich 4%, Tommy Thompson 2%, Duncan Hunter 2%, Sam Brownback 1%, Mike Huckabee 1%, Ron Paul 1%, Tom Tancredo 1%, Undecided 15%
American Research Group	June 26–30, 2007	Mitt Romney 25%, Rudolph Giuliani 18%, Fred Thompson 14%, John McCain 13%, Newt Gingrich 5%, Tommy Thompson 3%, Sam Brownback 3%, Mike Huckabee 1%, Ron Paul 1%, Tom Tancredo 1%, Duncan Hunter 1%, Chuck Hagel 1%, Undecided 14%
Mason-Dixon	June 16, 2007	Mitt Romney 25%, Fred Thompson 17%, Rudolph Giuliani 15%, Mike Huckabee 7%, Sam Brownback 6%, John McCain 6%, Undecided 21%
Voter/Consumer Research (R)	May 29–31, 2007	Mitt Romney 29%, Rudy Giuliani 12%, Newt Gingrich 10%, Fred Thompson 10%, John McCain 9%, Mike Huckabee 7%
Public Policy Polling (R)	May 30, 2007	Mitt Romney 31%, Fred Thompson 15%, Newt Gingrich 10%, John McCain 9%, Rudy Giuliani 8%, Tommy Thompson 5%, Brownback 4%, Mike Huckabee 4%, Tom Tancredo 4%, Ron Paul 2%, Duncan Hunter 1%, Jim Gilmore 0%, Undecided 8%
American Research Group	May 23–25, 2007	John McCain 25%, Rudy Giuliani 23%, Mitt Romney 16%, Newt Gingrich 8%, Fred Thompson 6%, Brownback 3%, Chuck Hagel 2%, Mike Huckabee 2%, Tancredo 2%, Tommy Thompson 2%, Jim Gilmore 1%, Duncan Hunter -, Pataki -, Ron Paul -, Undecided 10%
Des Moines Register (likely Caucus-goers)	May 12–16, 2007	Mitt Romney 30%, John McCain 18%, Rudy Giuliani 17%, Tommy Thompson 7%, Sam Brownback 5%, Mike Huckabee 4%, Tom Tancredo 4%, John Cox 1%, Gilmore 1%, Hunter 1%, Paul -, Undecided 12%
Zogby	May 14–15, 2007	Mitt Romney 19%, Rudy Giuliani 18%, John McCain 18%, Fred Thompson 9%, Tommy Thompson 4%, Tom Tancredo 3%, Sam Brownback 2%, Mike Huckabee 2%, Chuck Hagel -, Undecided 22%
American Research Group	April 27–30, 2007	John McCain 26%, Rudy Giuliani 19%, Mitt Romney 14%, Fred Thompson 13%, Newt Gingrich 8%, Mike Huckabee 2%, Tom Tancredo 2%, Sam Browback 1%, Jim Gilmore 1%, Chuck Hagel 1%, Tommy Thompson 1%, Duncan Hunter 0%, George Pataki 0%, Ron Paul 0%, Undecided 13%
University of Iowa (Likely Caucus Goers)	Mar 19–31, 2007	John McCain 20.9%, Rudy Giuliani 20.3%, Mitt Romney 16.9%, Undecided 23.2%
American Research Group	March 23, 2007	John McCain 29%, Rudy Giuliani 29%, Fred Thompson 12%, Mitt Romney 10%, Newt Gingrich 7%, Chuck Hagel 1%, Tom Tancredo 1%, Tommy Thompson 1%, Sam Brownback 0%, Jim Gilmore 0%, Duncan Hunter 0%, Mike Huckabee 0%, George Pataki 0%, Ron Paul 0%, Undecided 11%
Zogby International Margin of Error: +/- 4.6% Sample Size: 465 likely caucus goers	January 15–16, 2007	Rudy Giuliani 19%, John McCain 17%, Newt Gingrich 13%, Condoleezza Rice 9%, Mitt Romney 5%, Tom Tancredo 2%, Chuck Hagel 2%, Sam Brownback 1%, Tommy Thompson 1%, Mike Huckabee 1%, George Pataki 1%, Undecided 22%
American Research Group	Dec 19–23, 2006	Rudy Giuliani 28%, John McCain 26%, Newt Gingrich 18%, Chuck Hagel 6%, Mitt Romney 6%, Sam Brownback 1%, Mike Huckabee 1%, Jim Gilmore 0%, Duncan Hunter 0%, George Pataki 0%, Tommy Thompson 0%, Undecided 14%

=== Kansas ===
Kansas Winner: Mike Huckabee
Caucus Date: February 9, 2008

Poll Source	Date	Highlights
Caucus results Sampling Size: 19,516	February 9, 2008	Mike Huckabee 59.6%, John McCain 23.5%, Ron Paul 11.2%, Mitt Romney 3.3%, Uncommitted 0.4%, Fred Thompson 0.3%, Rudy Giuliani 0.2%, Others 1.5%
Research 2000 Margin of Error: 5% Sampling Size: 400	May 21–23, 2007	Sam Brownback 18%, Mitt Romney 17%, Rudy Giuliani 13%, John McCain 13%, Fred Thompson 7%, Newt Gingrich 6%, Tom Tancredo 2%, All Others >1%

=== Louisiana ===
Louisiana Winner: Mike Huckabee
Primary Date February 9, 2008

Poll Source	Date	Highlights
Primary results Sampling Size: 161,319	February 9, 2008	Mike Huckabee 43.2%, John McCain 41.9%, Mitt Romney 6.3%, Ron Paul 5.3%, Fred Thompson 1.0%, Rudy Giuliani 1.0%, Duncan Hunter 0.2%, Tom Tancredo 0.1%, Others 1.0%

=== Maine ===
Maine Winner: Mitt Romney
Caucus Dates: February 1–3, 2008
See also

Poll Source	Date	Highlights
Caucus results Sampling Size: 4,543	February 1, 2008	Mitt Romney 52%, John McCain 21.1%, Ron Paul 18.7%, Mike Huckabee 5.9%, Fred Thompson 0.1%, Others 2.2%
Critical Insights	October 10–24, 2007	Mitt Romney 15%, Rudy Giuliani 11%, Fred Thompson 9%, John McCain 7%, Someone else 7%, Undecided 51%
Critical Insights	April 20–27, 2007	Rudy Giuliani 24%, John McCain 21%, Mitt Romney 12%, Fred Thompson 9%, Someone else 9%, Undecided 25%
American Research Group Margin of Error: +/- 4% Sample Size: 600 (498 R, 102 I)	Feb 2–6, 2007	Rudy Giuliani 33%, John McCain 22%, Newt Gingrich 13%, Mitt Romney 13%, Chuck Hagel 1%, Sam Brownback 0%, Jim Gilmore 0%, Mike Huckabee 0%, Duncan Hunter 0%, George Pataki 0%, Ron Paul 0%, Tom Tancredo 0%, Tommy Thompson 0%, Undecided 18%
American Research Group	April 25 – May 2, 2006	John McCain 39%, Newt Gingrich 9%, Mitt Romney 8%, Bill Frist 3%, George Allen 1%, Sam Brownback 1%, Chuck Hagel 1%, George Pataki 1%, Undecided 37%
American Research Group	Feb 2006	John McCain 39%, Mitt Romney 10%, Newt Gingrich 7%, Bill Frist 2%, George Pataki 2%, Undecided 39%

=== Maryland ===
Maryland Winner: John McCain
Primary Date: February 12, 2008

Poll Source	Date	Highlights
Primary results Sample Size: 297,217	February 12, 2008	John McCain 55.1%, Mike Huckabee 29.1%, Mitt Romney 6.3%, Ron Paul 6%, Rudy Giuliani 1.3%, Fred Thompson 0.9%, Duncan Hunter 0.2%, Tom Tancredo 0.1%, Others 1%
Survey USA Sample Size: 368; Margin of Error: ± 5.2%	February 9–10, 2008	John McCain 52%, Mike Huckabee 26%, Ron Paul 10%, Other 8%, Undecided 4%
American Research Group Sample Size: 600; Margin of Error: ± 4%	February 8–9, 2008	John McCain 50%, Mike Huckabee 25%, Ron Paul 11%, Other 6%, Undecided 7%
Mason Dixon Sampling Size: 400; Margin of Error: ± 5%	February 7–8, 2008	John McCain 54%, Mike Huckabee 23%, Ron Paul 7%, Others 3%, Undecided 13%
Survey USA Sample Size: 360; Margin of Error: ± 5.2%	February 7–8, 2008	John McCain 56%, Mike Huckabee 17%, Ron Paul 10%, Other 12%, Undecided 4%
Baltimore Sun/Opinion Works Sample Size: 304; Margin of Error: ± 5.6%	January 6–9, 2008	John McCain 26%, Mike Huckabee 18%, Rudy Giuliani 16%, Mitt Romney 12%, Fred Thompson 6%, Other 7%, Undecided 13%, Refused 2%, Will Not Vote 1%
WashingtonPost Margin of Error: +/- 3% Sample Size: 1,103 Adults	October 18–27, 2007	Rudy Giuliani 39%, John McCain 18%, Fred Thompson 14%, Mitt Romney 10%, Ron Paul 4%, Mike Huckabee 2%, Tom Tancredo 2%, Duncan Hunter 0%
OpinionWorks	August 24–26, 2007	Rudy Giuliani 32%, John McCain 13%, Fred Thompson 12%, Mitt Romney 8%, Undecided 29%

=== Massachusetts ===
Massachusetts Winner: Mitt Romney
Primary Date: February 5, 2008
See also

Poll Source	Date	Highlights
Primary results Sampling Size: 497,531	February 5, 2008	Mitt Romney 51.3%, John McCain 41%, Mike Huckabee 3.9%, Ron Paul 2.7%, Rudy Giuliani 0.5%, Fred Thompson 0.2%, Duncan Hunter 0.1%, Others 0.4%
Survey USA Sampling Size: 275; Margin of Error: ±6%	February 2–3, 2008	Mitt Romney 58%, John McCain 37%, Mike Huckabee 3%, Ron Paul 1%, Undecided 1%
Suffolk University/WHDH Margin of Error: ±4.9%	February 1–3, 2008	Mitt Romney 50%, John McCain 37%, Mike Huckabee 4%, Undecided 6%
Survey USA Sampling Size: 297; Margin of Error: ±5.7%	January 30, 2008	Mitt Romney 57%, John McCain 34%, Mike Huckabee 3%, Ron Paul 3%, Other 1%, Undecided 2%
Rasmussen Reports Sampling Size: 408; Margin of Error: ±4%	January 28, 2008	Mitt Romney 55%, John McCain 23%, Mike Huckabee 8%, Ron Paul 4%, Other 2%, Undecided 2%
Survey USA Sampling Size: 262; Margin of Error: ±6.2%	January 22–23, 2008	Mitt Romney 50%, John McCain 29%, Mike Huckabee 7%, Rudy Giuliani 6%, Ron Paul 3%, Other 1%, Undecided 2%
Survey USA Sampling Size: 269; Margin of Error: ±6.1%	January 16, 2008	Mitt Romney 48%, John McCain 34%, Rudy Giuliani 8%, Mike Huckabee 3%, Fred Thompson 2%, Ron Paul 2%, Other 1%, Undecided 4%
Suffolk University	April 12–15, 2007	Rudy Giuliani 33%, Mitt Romney 21%, John McCain 18%, Tom Tancredo 4%, Fred Thompson 4%, Newt Gingrich 3%, Jim Gilmore 1%, Chuck Hagel 1%, Mike Huckabee 1%, Tommy Thompson 1%, Sam Brownback 0%, Duncan Hunter 0%, George Pataki 0%, Ron Paul 0%, Undecided 12%
American Research Group Margin of Error: +/- 4% Sample Size: 600 (275 R, 325 I)	Feb 2–6, 2007	Mitt Romney 38%, Rudy Giuliani 22%, John McCain 20%, Newt Gingrich 2%, Chuck Hagel 1%, Sam Brownback 0%, Jim Gilmore 0%, Mike Huckabee 0%, Duncan Hunter 0%, George Pataki 0%, Ron Paul 0%, Tom Tancredo 0%, Tommy Thompson 0%, Undecided 17%
American Research Group	April 25 – May 2, 2006	John McCain 48%, Mitt Romney 17%, Newt Gingrich 2%, George Pataki 1%, Undecided 32%
American Research Group	Feb 2006	John McCain 49%, Mitt Romney 20%, Newt Gingrich 4%, George Pataki 2%, George Allen 1%, Bill Frist 1%, Undecided 23%
American Research Group	Aug 2005	John McCain 46%, Mitt Romney 22%, Bill Frist 15%, Newt Gingrich 4%, Undecided 26%

=== Michigan ===
Michigan Winner: Mitt Romney
Primary Date: January 15, 2008

See also

Poll Source	Date	Highlights
Primary results Sampling Size: 868,083	January 15, 2008	Mitt Romney 38.9%, John McCain 29.7%, Mike Huckabee 16.1%, Ron Paul 6.3%, Fred Thompson 3.7%, Rudy Giuliani 2.8%, Duncan Hunter .3%, Tom Tancredo .1%, Uncommitted 2.1%
Reuters/C-SPAN/Zogby Sampling Size: 824; Margin of Error: ±3.4%	January 13–14, 2008	John McCain 27%, Mitt Romney 26%, Mike Huckabee 15%, Ron Paul 8%, Rudy Giuliani 6%, Fred Thompson 3%, Undecided 15%
American Research Group Sampling Size: 600; Margin of Error: ±4%	January 12–14, 2008	John McCain 31%, Mitt Romney 30%, Mike Huckabee 19%, Ron Paul 9%, Rudy Giuliani 5%, Fred Thompson 4%, Undecided 4%
Mitchell Interactive Sampling Size: 589; Margin of Error: ±4.1%	January 12–14, 2008	Mitt Romney 35%, John McCain 29%, Mike Huckabee 12%, Ron Paul 4%, Fred Thompson 4%, Rudy Giuliani 3%, Duncan Hunter 2%, Uncommitted 7%, Undecided 4%
Reuters/C-SPAN/Zogby Sampling Size: 915; Margin of Error: ±3.3%	January 11–13, 2008	John McCain 27%, Mitt Romney 24%, Mike Huckabee 15%, Ron Paul 8%, Rudy Giuliani 6%, Fred Thompson 5%, Undecided 9%
Mitchell Interactive Sampling Size: 582; Margin of Error: 4.1%	January 10–13, 2008	Mitt Romney 29%, John McCain 27%, Mike Huckabee 12%, Rudy Giuliani 7%, Ron Paul 7%, Fred Thompson 4%, Duncan Hunter 2%, Uncommitted 6%, Undecided 5%
Detroit News/WXYZ Sampling Size: 604; Margin of Error: ±4%	January 9–12, 2008	John McCain 27%, Mitt Romney 26%, Mike Huckabee 19%, Rudy Giuliani 6%, Fred Thompson 5%, Ron Paul 4%, Undecided 10%
Mitchell Interactive Sampling Size: 520; Margin of Error: ±4.3%	January 9–12, 2008	John McCain 22%, Mitt Romney 21%, Mike Huckabee 12%, Rudy Giuliani 7%, Ron Paul 7%, Fred Thompson 3%, Duncan Hunter 1%, Undecided 18%, Uncommitted 8%
MSNBC/McClatchy/Mason Dixon Sampling Size: 400; Margin of Error: ±5%	January 9–11, 2008	Mitt Romney 30%, John McCain 22%, Mike Huckabee 17%, Fred Thompson 7%, Rudy Giuliani 6%, Ron Paul 5%, Duncan Hunter 1%, Alan Keyes 1%, Undecided 11%
Detroit Free Press Sampling Size: 600; Margin of Error: ±4%	January 9–11, 2008	Mitt Romney 27%, John McCain 22%, Mike Huckabee 16%, Ron Paul 5%, Rudy Giuliani 4%, Fred Thompson 4%, Uncommitted 16%, Not Sure 6%
American Research Group Sampling Size: 600; Margin of Error: ±4%	January 9–11, 2008	John McCain 34%, Mitt Romney 27%, Mike Huckabee 15%, Ron Paul 9%, Rudy Giuliani 5%, Fred Thompson 4%, Undecided 6%
Mitchell Interactive Margin of Error: ±5%	January 9–10, 2008	John McCain 23%, Mitt Romney 17%, Mike Huckabee 11%, Rudy Giuliani 8%, Ron Paul 8%
Rasmussen Reports Sampling Size: 371; Margin of Error: ±5%	January 9, 2008	Mitt Romney 26%, John McCain 25%, Mike Huckabee 17%, Fred Thompson 9%, Ron Paul 8%, Rudy Giuliani 6%
Rossman Group Sampling Size: 300; Margin of Error: ±5.8%	January 6–7, 2008	Mike Huckabee 23%, Mitt Romney 22%, John McCain 18%, Rudy Giuliani 8%, Fred Thompson 4%, Ron Paul 3%, Duncan Hunter 1%, Uncommitted 13%, Unsure 7%
Strategic Vision (note) Sampling Size: 700; Margin of Error: ±4%	January 4–6, 2008	John McCain 29%, Mitt Romney 20%, Mike Huckabee 18%, Rudy Giuliani 13%, Fred Thompson 5%, Ron Paul 5%, Duncan Hunter 1%, Undecided 9%
Detroit News/WXYZ Sampling size: 612 LV; Margin of error 4%	December 16–19, 2007	Mitt Romney 21%, Huckabee 19%, Giuliani 12%, John McCain 10%, Ron Paul 4%, Fred Thompson 4%, Duncan Hunter 1%, Tom Tancredo 1%, Uncommitted 16%, Undecided 10%
Marketing Resource Group	December 4–7, 2007	John McCain 21%, Mitt Romney 18%, Mike Huckabee 16%, Rudy Giuliani 8%, Fred Thompson 5%, Ron Paul 4%
Rasmussen Reports	December 4, 2007	Mike Huckabee 21%, Mitt Romney 20%, Rudy Giuliani 19%, Fred Thompson 9%, John McCain 8%, Ron Paul 7%, Tom Tancredo 1%, Duncan Hunter 1%, Undecided 14%
The Rossman Group	November 30 – December 3, 2007n	Mitt Romney 20%, Mike Huckabee 19%, John McCain 13%, Rudy Giuliani 11%, Fred Thompson 8%, Ron Paul 1%
Strategic Vision (R)	October 5–7, 2007	Rudy Giuliani 24%, Mitt Romney 20%, Fred Thompson 15%, John McCain 10%, Mike Huckabee 5%, Ron Paul 4%, Tom Tancredo 2%, Duncan Hunter 1%, Sam Brownback 1%, Undecided 18%
Insider Advantage/Majority Opinion	Oct. 2–3, 2007	Rudy Giuliani 19%, Mitt Romney 16%, John McCain 15%, Fred Thompson 14%, Mike Huckabee 6%, Ron Paul 5%, Sam Brownback 2%, Duncan Hunter 2%, Undecided 21%
Marketing Resource Group	Sept 13–19, 2007	Rudy Giuliani 27%, Mitt Romney 13%, Fred Thompson 13%, Duncan Hunter 7%, John McCain 6%, Mike Huckabee 5%, Sam Brownback 4%, Ron Paul 2%, Tom Tancredo 0%
Mitchell Interactive	Sept 13–18, 2007	Mitt Romney 21%, Rudy Giuliani 19%, Fred Thompson 18%, John McCain 10%
American Research Group	Sept 1–4, 2007	Mitt Romney 39%, Rudy Giuliani 13%, Fred Thompson 12%, John McCain 9%, Newt Gingrich 7%, Mike Huckabee 4%, Sam Brownback 1%, Ron Paul 1%, Duncan Hunter 1%, Tom Tancredo -, Undecided 13%
Detroit News/WXYZ-TV Sampling Size: 400; Margin of Error: 4.9%	August 26–31, 2007	Mitt Romney 25%, Rudy Giuliani 23%, Fred Thompson 16%, John McCain 15%
Detroit News	August 8–13, 2007	Fred Thompson 22%, Rudy Giuliani 19%, John McCain 16%, Newt Gingrich 15%, Mitt Romney 12%
Reichle Firm	July 11–13, 2007	Mitt Romney 22%, Rudy Giuliani 14%, John McCain 14%, Fred Thompson 12%, Other/Undecided 38%
Strategic Vision (R)	July 6–8, 2007	Rudy Giuliani 20%, Mitt Romney 15%, John McCain 14%, Fred Thompson 14%, Newt Gingrich 4%, Brownback 3%, Huckabee 3%, Paul 3%, Tancredo 2%, Gilmore 1%, Hunter 1%, Tommy Thompson 1%, Undecided 19%,
American Research Group	May 4–8, 2007	Mitt Romney 24%, John McCain 22%, Rudy Giuliani 19%, Fred Thompson 8%, Newt Gingrich 7%, Mike Huckabee 2%, Tommy Thompson 2%, Tom Tancredo 1%, Sam Brownback 0%, Jim Gilmore 0%, Chuck Hagel 0%, Duncan Hunter 0%, George Pataki 0%, Ron Paul 0%, Undecided 15%
Strategic Vision (R)	April 13–15, 2007	Rudy Giuliani 26%, John McCain 22%, Mitt Romney 10% Fred Thompson 9%, Newt Gingrich 4%, Sam Brownback 3%, Tom Tancredo 2%, Mike Huckabee 1%, Tommy Thompson 1%, Jim Gilmore 1%, Duncan Hunter 1%, Ron Paul 1%, Chuck Hagel 1%, Undecided 18%
EPIC-MRA	Mar 12–18, 2007	John McCain 30%, Rudy Giuliani 26%, Mitt Romney 21%, Newt Gingrich 16%, Fred Thompson 2% (vol.), Sam Brownback 1%, Undecided 4%
Strategic Vision (note)	Mar 9–11, 2007	Rudy Giuliani 28%, John McCain 24%, Mitt Romney 14%, Newt Gingrich 8%, Sam Brownback 4%, Tom Tancredo 3%, Tommy Thompson 2%, Mike Huckabee 1%, Chuck Hagel 1%, Duncan Hunter 1%, Jim Gilmore 1%, Undecided 13%
Detroit Free Press	February 3, 2007	Rudy Giuliani 32%, John McCain 28%, Newt Gingrich 16%, Mitt Romney 8%
American Research Group	January 4–7, 2007	Rudy Giuliani 34%, John McCain 24%, Mitt Romney 10%, Newt Gingrich 9%, Tommy Thompson 7%, Mike Huckabee 2%, Undecided 14%

=== Minnesota ===
Minnesota Winner: Mitt Romney
Caucus Date: February 5, 2008

Poll Source	Date	Highlights
Caucus results Sample Size: 62,837	February 5, 2008	Mitt Romney 41.4%, John McCain 22%, Mike Huckabee 19.9%, Ron Paul 15.7%, Others 1%
Minn. Pub. Radio Sample Size: 317; Margin of Error: +/-5.5%	January 18–27, 2008	John McCain 41%, Mike Huckabee 22%, Mitt Romney 17%, Ron Paul 5%, Rudy Giuliani, 6%
Star Tribune GOP	Sep 18–23, 2007	Rudy Giuliani 27%, John McCain 22%, Fred Thompson 16%, Mitt Romney 5%, Tom Tancredo 3%, Mike Huckabee 2%, Ron Paul 2%

=== Missouri ===
Missouri Winner: John McCain
Primary Date: February 5, 2008
See also

Poll Source	Date	Highlights
Primary results Sampling Size: 589,289	February 5, 2008	John McCain 33%, Mike Huckabee 31.5%, Mitt Romney 29.3%, Ron Paul 4.5%, Rudy Giuliani 0.6%, Fred Thompson 0.5%, Uncommitted 0.4%, Duncan Hunter 0.1%, Others 0.2%
Reuters/C-SPAN/Zogby Tracking Sampling Size: 860; Margin of Error: ±3.4%	February 3–4, 2008	John McCain 34%, Mike Huckabee 27%, Mitt Romney 25%, Ron Paul 4%, Other 2%, Undecided 7%
American Research Group Sampling Size: 600; Margin of Error: ±4%	February 3, 2008	Mike Huckabee 31%, John McCain 29%, Mitt Romney 27%, Ron Paul 4%, Other 2%, Undecided 7%
Survey USA Sampling Size: 542; Margin of Error: ±4.3%	February 2–3, 2008	John McCain 33%, Mike Huckabee 31%, Mitt Romney 28%, Ron Paul 6%, Other 1%, Undecided 1%
American Research Group Sampling Size: 600; Margin of Error: ±4%	January 31 – February 1, 2008	Mike Huckabee 31%, John McCain 29%, Mitt Romney 27%, Ron Paul 4%, Other 2%, Undecided 7%
McClatchy/MSNBC/Mason Dixon Sampling Size: 400; Margin of Error: ±5%	January 30 – February 1, 2008	John McCain 37%, Mike Huckabee 27%, Mitt Romney 24%, Ron Paul 1%, Undecided 11%
Rasmussen Reports Sampling Size: 505; Margin of Error: ±4%	January 31, 2008	John McCain 32%, Mike Huckabee 29%, Mitt Romney 28%, Ron Paul 5%, Other 3%, Undecided 3%
Survey USA Sampling Size: 505; Margin of Error: ±4.5%	January 30–31, 2008	John McCain 34%, Mitt Romney 30%, Mike Huckabee 28%, Ron Paul 5%, Other 2%, Undecided 2%
Research 2000 Sampling Size: 500; Margin of Error: ±4.5%	January 21–24, 2008	John McCain 31%, Mike Huckabee 25%, Mitt Romney 21%, Rudy Giuliani 8%, Ron Paul 6%, Fred Thompson 1%, Undecided 8%
Rasmussen Reports Sampling Size: 589; Margin of Error: ±4%	January 23, 2008	Mike Huckabee 27%, John McCain 26%, Mitt Romney 18%, Rudy Giuliani 7%, Ron Paul 5%, Undecided 16%
Research 2000	November 16, 2007	Rudy Giuliani 24%, Mitt Romney 17%, Fred Thompson 16%, John McCain 14%, Mike Huckabee 12%, Ron Paul 2%, Duncan Hunter 1%, Tom Tancredo -, Undecided 14%
American Research Group Sample Size: 600 Margin of Error: +/- 4%	Aug 2–6, 2007	Rudy Giuliani 23%, Fred Thompson 22%, John McCain 14%, Mitt Romney 11%, Newt Gingrich 10%, Mike Huckabee 3%, Sam Brownback 1%, Ron Paul 1%, Tommy Thompson 1%, Duncan Hunter -, Tom Tancredo -, Undecided 14%
American Research Group	January 4–7, 2007	John McCain 31%, Rudy Giuliani 18%, Newt Gingrich 14%, Sam Brownback 5%, Chuck Hagel 3%, Mitt Romney 2%, Tommy Thompson 2%, Mike Huckabee 1%, Undecided 24%

=== Montana ===
Montana Winner: Mitt Romney
Caucus Date: February 5, 2008

Poll Source	Date	Highlights
Caucus results	February 5, 2008	Mitt Romney 38.3%, Ron Paul 24.5%, John McCain 22%, Mike Huckabee 15%, Others 0.1%
Lee's Newspaper Margin of Error: The website states all four candidates are statically even.	January 2, 2008	Mike Huckabee 16%, Rudy Giuliani 15%, Mitt Romney 13%, Fred Thompson 12%

=== Nevada ===
Nevada Winner: Mitt Romney
Caucus Date: January 19, 2008

See also

Poll Source	Date	Highlights
Caucus results Sampling Size: 44,321	January 19, 2008	Mitt Romney 51.1%, Ron Paul 13.7%, John McCain 12.7%, Mike Huckabee 8.2%, Fred Thompson 7.9%, Rudy Giuliani 4.3%, Duncan Hunter 2%
Mason-Dixon Sample Size: 500; Margin of Error: ±4.5%	January 14–16, 2008	Mitt Romney 34%, John McCain 19%, Mike Huckabee 13%, Fred Thompson 8%, Ron Paul 7%, Rudy Giuliani 6%
American Research Group Sample Size: 600; Margin of Error: ±4%	January 9–14, 2008	Mitt Romney 28%, John McCain 21%, Fred Thompson 13%, Rudy Giuliani 11%, Ron Paul 9%, Mike Huckabee 8%, Undecided 10%
Research 2000/Reno Gazette-Journal Sampling Size: 500; Margin of Error: ±4.5%	January 11–13, 2008	John McCain 22%, Rudy Giuliani 18%, Mike Huckabee 16%, Mitt Romney 15%, Fred Thompson 11%, Ron Paul 6%, Duncan Hunter 1%
American Research Group Sample Size: 600; Margin of Error: ±4%	December 1–6, 2007	Mitt Romney 29%, Mike Huckabee 23%, Rudy Giuliani 17%, John McCain 7%, Fred Thompson 5%, Duncan Hunter 4%, Ron Paul 3%, Tom Tancredo 1%, Alan Keyes 0%, Undecided 11%
Mason-Dixon Sample Size: 300; Margin of Error: ±6%	December 3–5, 2007	Rudy Giuliani 25%, Mitt Romney 20%, Mike Huckabee 17%, Fred Thompson 9%, John McCain 7%, Ron Paul 5%, Duncan Hunter 2%, Tom Tancredo 1%, Alan Keyes 0%, Undecided 14%
Research 2000	November 16–19, 2007	Rudy Giuliani 29%, Mitt Romney 22%, Fred Thompson 15%, John McCain 8%, Ron Paul 7%, Mike Huckabee 6%, Tom Tancredo 1%, Duncan Hunter 1%, Undecided 11%
Zogby International	November 9–10, 2007	Rudy Giuliani 28%, Mitt Romney 20%, Fred Thompson 13%, John McCain 8%, Ron Paul 7%, Mike Huckabee 5%, Duncan Hunter 1%, Tom Tancredo <1%, Not Sure 16%
Mason-Dixon	October 9–11, 2007	Rudy Giuliani 28%, Fred Thompson 23%, Mitt Romney 17%, John McCain 7%, Mike Huckabee 2%, Duncan Hunter 2%, Ron Paul 1%, Undecided 18%
American Research Group	October 10, 2007	Rudy Giuliani 31%, Mitt Romney 30%, John McCain 11%, Fred Thompson 9%, Sam Brownback 4%, Mike Huckabee 2%, Duncan Hunter 1%, Ron Paul 1%, Tom Tancredo 1%, Alan Keyes 0%, Undecided 10%
2000	August 14–16, 2007	Mitt Romney 28%, Rudy Giuliani 18%, Fred Thompson 18%, John McCain 8%, Newt Gingrich 4%, Mike Huckabee 3%, Undecided 18%
Mason-Dixon Margin of Error: +/- 5%	June 20–22, 2007	Fred Thompson 25%, Mitt Romney 20%, Rudy Giuliani 17%, John McCain 8%, Mike Huckabee 3%
American Research Group Margin of Error: +/- 4% Sampling Size: 600	June 15–19, 2007	Mitt Romney 23%, Rudy Giuliani 21%, John McCain 16%, Fred Thompson 16%, Newt Gingrich 3%, Gilmore 2%, Sam Brownback 1%, Mike Huckabee 1%, Ron Paul 1%, Tom Tancredo 1%, Tommy Thompson 1%, Chuck Hagel 0%, Duncan Hunter 0%, George Pataki 0%, Undecided 15%
Mason-Dixon Margin of Error: +/- 6%	Apr 30 – May 2, 2007	John McCain 19%, Mitt Romney 15%, Fred Thompson 13%, Rudy Giuliani 12%, Newt Gingrich 7%, Undecided 28%
Zogby Margin of Error: +/- 4.5%	Apr 11–12, 2007	Rudy Giuliani 37%, John McCain 15%, Mitt Romney 15%, Fred Thompson 7%, Sam Brownback 1%, Mike Huckabee 1%, Duncan Hunter 1%, Ron Paul 1%, Tancredo 1%, Chuck Hagel 0%, Tommy Thompson 0%, Undecided 15%
American Research Group	Dec 19–23, 2006	Rudy Giuliani 31%, John McCain 25%, Newt Gingrich 22%, Mitt Romney 4%, Sam Brownback 0%, Gilmore 0%, Chuck Hagel 0%, Mike Huckabee 0%, Hunter 0%, George Pataki 0%, Tommy Thompson 0%, Undecided 18%

=== New Hampshire ===
New Hampshire Winner: John McCain
Primary Date: January 8, 2008

See also

Poll Source	Date	Highlights
Primary results Sampling Size: 238,548	January 8, 2008	John McCain 37.1%, Mitt Romney 31.6%, Mike Huckabee 11.2%, Rudy Giuliani 8.5%, Ron Paul 7.7%, Fred Thompson 1.2%, Duncan Hunter .5%, Write Ins 2.1%
Suffolk/WHDH 7 Sampling Size: 500	January 6–7, 2008	Mitt Romney 30%, John McCain 26%, Mike Huckabee 13%, Rudy Giuliani 11%, Ron Paul 5%, Fred Thompson 2%, Duncan Hunter 1%, Undecided 10%, Refused 1%
American Research Group Sampling Size: 600; Margin of Error: ±4%	January 6–7, 2008	John McCain 31%, Mitt Romney 24%, Mike Huckabee 14%, Rudy Giuliani 13%, Ron Paul 9%, Duncan Hunter 2%, Fred Thompson 1%, Alan Keyes 1%, Undecided 5%
Rasmussen Reports Sampling Size: 1549; Margin of Error: ±3%	January 5–7, 2008	John McCain 32%, Mitt Romney 31%, Mike Huckabee 10%, Rudy Giuliani 8%, Ron Paul 8%, Fred Thompson 3%, Some Other Candidate 3%, Not Sure 4%
Reuters/C-SPAN/Zogby Sampling Size: 862; Margin of Error: ±3.4%	January 5–7, 2008	John McCain 36%, Mitt Romney 27%, Mike Huckabee 10%, Rudy Giuliani 9%, Ron Paul 9%, Fred Thompson 2%, Undecided 5%
Suffolk/WHDH 7 Sampling Size: 500	January 5–6, 2008	Mitt Romney 30%, John McCain 27%, Rudy Giuliani 10%, Mike Huckabee 9%, Ron Paul 8%, Fred Thompson 2%, Undecided 13%, Refused 2%
Marist College Institute for Public Opinion Sampling Size: 628; Margin of Error: ±4%	January 5–6, 2008	John McCain 35%, Mitt Romney 31%, Mike Huckabee 13%, Ron Paul 8%, Rudy Giuliani 5%, Fred Thompson 4%, Duncan Hunter 2%, Other <1%, Undecided 2%
Rasmussen Reports Sampling Size: 1094; Margin of Error: ±3%	January 5–6, 2008	John McCain 32%, Mitt Romney 31%, Mike Huckabee 11%, Rudy Giuliani 10%, Ron Paul 8%, Fred Thompson 3%, Some Other Candidate 2%, Not Sure 4%
CNN/WMUR/UNH Sampling Size: 341; Margin of Error: ±5%	January 5–6, 2008	John McCain 32%, Mitt Romney 26%, Mike Huckabee 14%, Rudy Giuliani 11%, Ron Paul 10%, Fred Thompson 1%, Duncan Hunter 1%, Someone Else 2%, No Opinion 5%
Fox News/Opinion Dynamics Sampling Size: 500; Margin of Error: ±4%	January 4–6, 2008	John McCain 34%, Mitt Romney 27%, Mike Huckabee 11%, Rudy Giuliani 9%, Ron Paul 5%, Fred Thompson 2%, Duncan Hunter 1%, Other 1%, Don't Know 10%
Reuters/C–SPAN/Zogby Sample Size: 834; Margin of Error: ±3.4%	January 4–6, 2008	John McCain 34%, Mitt Romney 29%, Mike Huckabee 10%, Rudy Giuliani 9%, Ron Paul 6%, Fred Thompson 3%, Duncan Hunter 1%, Undecided 6%
Franklin Pierce University/WBZ Sampling Size: 409; Margin of Error: ±4.9%	January 4–6, 2008	John McCain 38%, Mitt Romney 29%, Mike Huckabee 9%, Rudy Giuliani 8%, Ron Paul 7%, Fred Thompson 2%, Undecided 7%
USA Today/Gallup Sampling Size: 776; Margin of Error: ±4%	January 4–6, 2008	John McCain 34%, Mitt Romney 30%, Mike Huckabee 13%, Rudy Giuliani 8%, Ron Paul 8%, No One Else Above 3%
Strategic Vision (note) Sampling Size: 600; Margin of Error: ±4.5%	January 4–6, 2008	John McCain 35%, Mitt Romney 27%, Mike Huckabee 13%, Rudy Giuliani 8%, Ron Paul 7%, Fred Thompson 5%, Duncan Hunter 1%, Undecided 4%
Suffolk/WHDH 7 Sampling Size: 500	January 4–5, 2008	Mitt Romney 30%, John McCain 27%, Rudy Giuliani 10%, Ron Paul 9%, Mike Huckabee 7%, Fred Thompson 2%, Duncan Hunter 1%, Undecided 12%, Refused 2%
Rasmussen Reports Sampling Size: 1102; Margin of Error: ±3%	January 4–5, 2008	John McCain 32%, Mitt Romney 30%, Mike Huckabee 11%, Ron Paul 11%, Rudy Giuliani 9%, Fred Thompson 4%, Some Other Candidate 2%, Not Sure 3%
Concord Monitor Sampling Size: 400; Margin of Error: ±5%	January 4–5, 2008	John McCain 35%, Mitt Romney 29%, Mike Huckabee 13%, Rudy Giuliani 8%, Ron Paul 7%, Fred Thompson 3%
CNN/WMUR/UNH Sampling Size: 672; Margin of Error: ±4%	January 4–5, 2008	John McCain 33%, Mitt Romney 27%, Rudy Giuliani 14%, Mike Huckabee 13%, Ron Paul 9%, Fred Thompson 1%, Duncan Hunter 1%, Someone Else 2%, No Opinion 4%
American Research Group Sampling Size: 600; Margin of Error: ±4%	January 4–5, 2008	John McCain 39%, Mitt Romney 25%, Mike Huckabee 14%, Rudy Giuliani 7%, Ron Paul 6%, Fred Thompson 1%, Duncan Hunter 1%, Alan Keyes 1%
Reuters/C–SPAN/Zogby Sample Size: 837; Margin of Error: ±3.4%	January 2–5, 2008	Mitt Romney 32%, John McCain 31%, Mike Huckabee 12%, Rudy Giuliani 7%, Ron Paul 6%, Fred Thompson 3%, Duncan Hunter 1%, Undecided 7%
Rasmussen Reports Sample Size: 441; Margin of Error: ±5%	January 4, 2008	John McCain 31%, Mitt Romney 26%, Ron Paul 14%, Mike Huckabee 11%, Rudy Giuliani 8%, Fred Thompson 5%, Some other candidate 2%
Suffolk University/WHDH 7 Sampling Size: 501	January 3–4, 2008	Mitt Romney 30%, John McCain 26%, Mike Huckabee 11%, Rudy Giuliani 11%, Ron Paul 8%, Fred Thompson 2%, Duncan Hunter 1%, Undecided 10%, Refused 2%
McClatchy/MSNBC/Mason Dixon Sampling Size: 400; Margin of Error: ±5%	January 2–4, 2008	John McCain 32%, Mitt Romney 24%, Mike Huckabee 12%, Rudy Giuliani 9%, Ron Paul 8%, Fred Thompson 3%, Duncan Hunter 1%, Alan Keyes 1%, Undecided 10%
Zogby International Sample Size: 887; Margin of Error: ±3.3%	January 1–4, 2008	John McCain 32%, Mitt Romney 30%, Mike Huckabee 12%, Rudy Giuliani 9%, Ron Paul 7%, Fred Thompson 3%, Duncan Hunter <1%, Undecided 7%
Suffolk University/WHDH 7 Sampling Size: 501	January 2–3, 2008	Mitt Romney 29%, John McCain 25%, Mike Huckabee 13%, Rudy Giuliani 9%, Ron Paul 8%, Fred Thompson 2%, Duncan Hunter 1%, Undecided 12%, Refused 1%
Zogby International Sample Size: 1076; Margin of Error: ±3%	December 31, 2007 – January 3, 2008	John McCain 34%, Mitt Romney 30%, Mike Huckabee 10%, Rudy Giuliani 9%, Ron Paul 7%, Fred Thompson 2%, Duncan Hunter 1%, Undecided 6%
Suffolk/WHDH 7 Sample Size: 500	January 1–2, 2008	John McCain 29%, Mitt Romney 25%, Mike Huckabee 12%, Rudy Giuliani 9%, Ron Paul 8%, Fred Thompson 2%, Duncan Hunter 1%, Undecided 14%
Franklin Pierce University/WBZ Sample Size: 407; Margin of Error ±4.9%	December 27–31, 2007	John McCain 37%, Mitt Romney 31%, Rudy Giuliani 10%, Ron Paul 6%, Mike Huckabee 5%, Fred Thompson 2%, Duncan Hunter 1%, Undecided 9%
CNN/University of New Hampshire Sample Size: 439; Margin of Error ±5%	December 27–30, 2007	Mitt Romney 29%, John McCain 29%, Rudy Giuliani 12%, Mike Huckabee 10%, Ron Paul 7%, Fred Thompson 2%, Duncan Hunter 2%, Someone else 1%, No opinion 8%
American Research Group Sample Size: 600; Margin of Error ±4%	December 27–29, 2007	Mitt Romney 30%, John McCain 30%, Mike Huckabee 11%, Rudy Giuliani 9%, Ron Paul 7%, Fred Thompson 3%, Duncan Hunter 1%, Alan Keyes 1%, Undecided 8%
LA Times/Bloomberg Sample Size: 442 (registered voters); Margin of Error: ±5%	December 20–26, 2007	Mitt Romney 34%, John McCain 21%, Rudy Giuliani 14%, Mike Huckabee 9%, Ron Paul 6%, Fred Thompson 4%, Duncan Hunter 1%, D/Know 11%
LA Times/Bloomberg Sample Size: 318 (likely voters); Margin of Error: ±6%	December 20–26, 2007	Mitt Romney 34%, John McCain 20%, Rudy Giuliani 17%, Mike Huckabee 12%, Ron Paul 4%, Fred Thompson 4%, Duncan Hunter 1%, D/Know 8%
USA Today /Gallup Sampling Size: 477 LV; Margin of Error: ± 5%	December 17–19, 2007	Mitt Romney 34%, John McCain 27%, Rudy Giuliani 11%, Mike Huckabee 9%, Ron Paul 9%, Fred Thompson 4%, Duncan Hunter 1%
American Research Group Sample Size: 600 LV; Margin of Error +/- 4%	December 16–19, 2007	John McCain 26%, Mitt Romney 26%, Rudy Giuliani 16%, Mike Huckabee 11%, Ron Paul 4%, Fred Thompson 4%, Tom Tancredo 1%, Duncan Hunter 1%, Alan Keyes 1%, Undecided 10%
Rasmussen Reports Sample Size: 746 LV; Margin of Error +/- 4%	December 18, 2007	Mitt Romney 31%, John McCain 27%, Rudy Giuliani 13%, Mike Huckabee 11%, Ron Paul 7%, Fred Thompson 3%, Tom Tancredo 1%, Duncan Hunter 0%
Concord Monitor/Research 2000 Sample Size: 400 LV; Margin of Error +/- 5%	December 10–12, 2007	Mitt Romney 31%, Rudy Giuliani 18%, John McCain 17%, Mike Huckabee 9%, Ron Paul 7%, Fred Thompson 3%, Tom Tancredo 1%, Duncan Hunter 1%, Undecided 13%
Rasmussen Sample Size: 732 LV	December 11, 2007	Mitt Romney 33%, John McCain 18%, Rudy Giuliani 15%, Mike Huckabee 14%, Ron Paul 8%, Tom Tancredo 3%, Fred Thompson 2%, Duncan Hunter 1%, Undecided 7%
Mason-Dixon	December 3–6, 2007	Mitt Romney 25%, Rudy Giuliani 17%, John McCain 16%, Mike Huckabee 11%, Fred Thompson 6%, Ron Paul 5%, Duncan Hunter 1%, Tom Tancredo 1%, Alan Keyes 1%, Undecided 17%
ABC News/Washington Post Sampling Size: 488; Margin of Error: +/- 4.5%	November 29 – December 3, 2007	Mitt Romney 37%, John McCain 20%, Rudy Giuliani 16%, Mike Huckabee 9%, Ron Paul 8%, Fred Thompson 4%, Duncan Hunter 1%, Tom Tancredo 0%, Undecided 4%
Marist College	November 28 – December 2, 2007	Mitt Romney 29%, Rudy Giuliani 17%, John McCain 17%, Mike Huckabee 11%, Ron Paul 6%, Fred Thompson 4%, Tom Tancredo 2%, Duncan Hunter 1%, Undecided 13%
American Research Group	November 26–29, 2007	Mitt Romney 36%, Rudy Giuliani 22%, Mike Huckabee 13%, John McCain 11%, Fred Thompson 3%, Ron Paul 2%, Tom Tancredo 1%, Duncan Hunter 0%, Alan Keyes 0%, Undecided 12%
Rasmussen Sampling Size: 881; Margin of Error: +/- 3%	November 29, 2007	Mitt Romney 34%, Rudy Giuliani 15%, John McCain 15%, Mike Huckabee 14%, Ron Paul 8%, Fred Thompson 3%, Other 2%, Unsure 9%
Pew Research Center Sampling Size: 446; Margin of Error: +/- 5.5%	November 7–25, 2007	Mitt Romney 37%, Rudy Giuliani 19%, John McCain 15%, Ron Paul 9%, Mike Huckabee 7%, Fred Thompson 3%, Hunter 1%, Tancredo 1%, Other/Unsure 9%
CBS News/New York Times Sampling Size: 719; Margin of Error: +/- 6%	November 2–11, 2007	Mitt Romney 34%, Rudy Giuliani 16%, John McCain 16%, Ron Paul 8%, Mike Huckabee 6%, Fred Thompson 5%, Tancredo 0%, Hunter 0%, Undecided 14%
Boston Globe (UNH)	November 2–7, 2007	Mitt Romney 32%, Rudy Giuliani 20%, John McCain 17%, Ron Paul 7%, Mike Huckabee 5%, Other 6%, Undecided 13%
Marist College	November 2–6, 2007	Mitt Romney 33%, Rudy Giuliani 22%, John McCain 13%, Ron Paul 7%, Mike Huckabee 7%, Fred Thompson 5%, Tom Tancredo 1%, Duncan Hunter <1%, Undecided 12%
American Research Group	October 26–29, 2007	Mitt Romney 30%, Rudy Giuliani 23%, John McCain 17%, Mike Huckabee 7%, Fred Thompson 5%, Ron Paul 1%, Duncan Hunter 1%, Tom Tancredo 1%, Alan Keyes 0%, Undecided 15%
Rasmussen	October 23, 2007	Mitt Romney 28%, Rudy Giuliani 19%, John McCain 16%, Mike Huckabee 10%, Fred Thompson 6%, Tom Tancredo 3%, Ron Paul 2%, Duncan Hunter 2%, Undecided 14%
Marist College Institute for Public Opinion (Likely Voters)	October 4–9, 2007	Mitt Romney 26%, Rudy Giuliani 20%, John McCain 17%, Fred Thompson 10%, Mike Huckabee 7%, Ron Paul 2%, Duncan Hunter 2%, Tom Tancredo 1%, Sam Brownback <1%, Undecided 15%
Insider Advantage/Majority Opinion	Oct. 2–3, 2007	Mitt Romney 28%, Rudy Giuliani 20%, John McCain 17%, Mike Huckabee 8%, Fred Thompson 8%, Ron Paul 6%, Sam Brownback 2%, Duncan Hunter 1%, Undecided 10%
American Research Group	September 26–29, 2007	Mitt Romney 24%, Rudy Giuliani 20%, John McCain 20%, Fred Thompson 8%, Newt Gingrich 6%, Ron Paul 3%, Mike Huckabee 3%, Sam Brownback 1%, Duncan Hunter 1%, Alan Keyes 1%, Tom Tancredo 1%, Undecided 12%
Zogby	September 26–28, 2007	Mitt Romney 24%, Rudy Giuliani 21%, John McCain 16%, Fred Thompson 7%, Mike Huckabee 5%, Ron Paul 3%, Tom Tancredo 3%, Duncan Hunter 1%, Sam Brownback 1%, Chuck Hagel <1%, Not Sure 17%
CNN/WMUR	September 17–24, 2007	Mitt Romney 23%, Rudy Giuliani 22%, John McCain 17%, Fred Thompson 12%, Newt Gingrich 7%, Ron Paul 4%, Sam Brownback 2%, Mike Huckabee 2%, Duncan Hunter 1%, Tom Tancredo 1%, Someone else 1%, No opinion 9%
Rasmussen	September 16, 2007	Mitt Romney 25%, Rudy Giuliani 22%, Fred Thompson 19%, John McCain 12%, Mike Huckabee 4%, Others 5%, Undecided 13%
Franklin Pierce University /WBZ Poll	September 11–14, 2007	Mitt Romney 30%, Rudy Giuliani 23%, John McCain 14%, Fred Thompson 8%, Newt Gingrich 3%, Ron Paul 3%, Mike Huckabee 2%, Tom Tancredo 1%, Sam Brownback 1%, Duncan Hunter 1%, Chuck Hagel <1%, Undecided 12%
Los Angeles Times/Bloomberg Poll	September 6–10, 2007	Mitt Romney 28%, Rudy Giuliani 23%, John McCain 12%, Fred Thompson 11%, Mike Huckabee 6%, Ron Paul 5%, Sam Brownback 2%, Undecided 13%
American Research Group	August 26–29, 2007	Mitt Romney 27%, Rudy Giuliani 23%, John McCain 12%, Mike Huckabee 9%, Fred Thompson 8%, Newt Gingrich 4%, Ron Paul 3%, Brownback 1%, Duncan Hunter 0%, Tom Tancredo 0%, Undecided 13%
Rasmussen Reports	August 9, 2007	Mitt Romney 32%, Rudy Giuliani 20%, John McCain 11%, Fred Thompson 11%, Mike Huckabee 3%, Other 6%, Undecided 17%
American Research Group Margin of Error: +/- 4% Sample Size: 600	July 26–30, 2007	Rudy Giuliani 27%, Mitt Romney 26%, Fred Thompson 13%, John McCain 10%, Newt Gingrich 6%, Sam Brownback 1%, Mike Huckabee 1%, Duncan Hunter 1%, Ron Paul 1%, Tom Tancredo 1%, Tommy Thompson 0%, Undecided 13%
McLaughlin and Associates (Gingrich Excluded)	July 24–26, 2007	Mitt Romney 33%, Rudy Giuliani 17%, John McCain 16%, Fred Thompson 13%, Mike Huckabee 3%, Ron Paul 2%, Sam Brownback 1%, Tommy Thompson 1%, Tom Tancredo 1%, Duncan Hunter 1%, Undecided 12%
CNN/WMUR/UNH (Gingrich Excluded)	July 9–17, 2007	Mitt Romney 33% (34%), Rudy Giuliani 18% (20%), Fred Thompson 13%, John McCain 12%, Newt Gingrich 4%, Mike Huckabee 2%, Ron Paul 2%, Tommy Thompson 1%, Tancredo – (1%), Brownback -, Hunter -, Other 3%, Undecided 12% (13%)
Research 2000	July 9–11, 2007	Mitt Romney 27%, Rudy Giuliani 20%, John McCain 16%, Fred Thompson 15%, Sam Brownback 1%, Mike Huckabee 1%, Duncan Hunter 1%, Ron Paul 1%, Tom Tancredo 1%, Tommy Thompson 1%
American Research Group	June 27–30, 2007	Mitt Romney 27%, John McCain 21%, Rudy Giuliani 19%, Fred Thompson 10%, Newt Gingrich 4%, Mike Huckabee 1%, Duncan Hunter 1%, Ron Paul 1%, Sam Brownback 1%, Tom Tancredo 1%, Jim Gilmore 0%, George Pataki 0%, Tommy Thompson 0%, Undecided 14%
Suffolk University	June 24, 2007	Mitt Romney 26%, Rudy Giuliani 22%, John McCain 13%, Fred Thompson 13%, Mike Huckabee 4%, Ron Paul 2%, Brownback 1%, Hunter 1%, Tancredo 1%, T. Thompson 1%, Gilmore 0%, Undecided 17%
Mason-Dixon	June 4–7, 2007	Mitt Romney 27%, John McCain 16%, Rudy Giuliani 15%, Fred Thompson 12%, Mike Huckabee 5%
Franklin Pierce	June 6, 2007	Mitt Romney 27%, Rudy Giuliani 18%, John McCain 17%, Fred Thompson 9%, Newt Gingrich 3%, Mike Huckabee 3%, Paul 1%, Brownback 1%, Hagel 1%, Tommy Thompson 1%, Gilmore 0%, Tancredo 1%, Hunter 1%, Pataki 0%, Undecided 19%
American Research Group	May 23–25, 2007	John McCain 30%, Mitt Romney 23%, Rudy Giuliani 21%, Newt Gingrich 4%, Fred Thompson 3%, Sam Brownback 1%, Chuck Hagel 1%, Mike Huckabee 1%, Tommy Thompson 1%, Jim Gilmore 0%, Duncan Hunter 0%, George Pataki 0%, Ron Paul 0%, Tom Tancredo 0%, Undecided 16%
Zogby	May 15–16, 2007	Mitt Romney 35%, Rudy Giuliani 19%, John McCain 19%, Fred Thompson 6%, Ron Paul 3%, Brownback 1%, Hagel 1%, Tancredo 1%, Tommy Thompson 1%, Huckabee -, Hunter -, Not Sure 11%
Survey USA	May 4–6, 2007	Mitt Romney 32%, Rudy Giuliani 23%, John McCain 22%, Fred Thompson 11%, Newt Gingrich 4%, Other 5%, Not Sure 3%
American Research Group	April 27–30, 2007	John McCain 29%, Mitt Romney 24%, Rudy Giuliani 17%, Fred Thompson 7%, Newt Gingrich 4%, Sam Browback 1%, Chuck Hagel 1%, Mike Huckabee 1%, Tom Tancredo 1%, Tommy Thompson 1%, Jim Gilmore 0%, Duncan Hunter 0%, George Pataki 0%, Ron Paul 0%, Undecided 14%
Zogby International	April 2–3, 2007	John McCain 25%, Mitt Romney 25%, Rudy Giuliani 19%, Fred Thompson 6%, Ron Paul 2%, Chuck Hagel 1%, Mike Huckbee 1%, Duncan Hunter 1%, Tom Tancredo 1%, Tommy Thompson <1%, Sam Brownback <1%, Undecided 17%
American Research Group	March 23, 2007	John McCain 23%, Rudy Giuliani 19%, Mitt Romney 17%, Newt Gingrich 11%, Fred Thompson 10%, Sam Brownback 2%, Chuck Hagel 2%, Tom Tancredo 1%, Jim Gilmore 0%, Mike Huckabee 0%, Duncan Hunter 0%, George Pataki 0%, Ron Paul 0%, Tommy Thompson 0%, Undecided 15%
Franklin Pierce College/WBZ-TV	Mar 7–12, 2007	John McCain 29%, Rudy Giuliani 28%, Mitt Romney 22%, Newt Gingrich 5%, Mike Huckabee 2%, Sam Brownback 1%, Chuck Hagel 1%, Duncan Hunter 1%, Ron Paul 1%, Tom Tancredo 1%, Jim Gilmore 0%, George Pataki 0%, Tommy Thompson 0%
Suffolk University	Feb 24–28, 2007	Rudy Giuliani 37%, John McCain 27%, Mitt Romney 17%, Ron Paul 2%, Tom Tancredo 2%, Sam Brownback 1%, Jim Gilmore 1%, Mike Huckabee 1%, Duncan Hunter 1%, Tommy Thompson 1%, Refused 1%, Undecided 12%
University of New Hampshire	Feb 1–5, 2007	John McCain 28%, Rudy Giuliani 27%, Mitt Romney 13%, Newt Gingrich 9%, Tom Tancredo 3%, Sam Brownback 2%, Ron Paul 1%, Mike Huckabee 1%, Tommy Thompson 1%, Chuck Hagel 1%, George Pataki 1%, Duncan Hunter 0%, Jim Gilmore 0%, John Cox 0%, Someone Else 1%, Don't Know 13%
SurveyUSA	January 26–28, 2007	Rudy Giuliani 33%, John McCain 32%, Mitt Romney 21%, Other 11%, Undecided 3%
Zogby International	January 15–17, 2007	John McCain 23%, Rudy Giuliani 20%, Mitt Romney 13%, Condoleezza Rice 7%, Newt Gingrich 6%, Chuck Hagel 3%, Tom Tancredo 2%, Duncan Hunter 1%, George Pataki 1%, Ron Paul 1%, Undecided 15%
American Research Group	Dec 26–27, 2006	John McCain 29%, Rudy Giuliani 25%, Newt Gingrich 14%, Mitt Romney 9%, Chuck Hagel 2%, George Pataki 2%, Jim Gilmore 1%, Mike Huckabee 1%, Sam Brownback 0%, Duncan Hunter 0%, Tommy Thompson 0%, Undecided 17%

=== New Jersey ===
New Jersey Winner: John McCain
Primary Date: February 5, 2008

See also

Poll Source	Date	Highlights
Primary results Sampling Size: 560,006	February 5, 2008	John McCain 55.4%, Mitt Romney 28.4%, Mike Huckabee 8.2%, Ron Paul 4.8%, Rudy Giuliani 2.6%, Fred Thompson 0.6%
Reuters/C-SPAN/Zogby Tracking Sampling Size: 862; Margin of Error: ±3.4%	February 3–4, 2008	John McCain 53%, Mitt Romney 24%, Mike Huckabee 5%, Ron Paul 4%, Other 4%, Undecided 10%
Survey USA Sampling Size: 467; Margin of Error: ±4.6%	February 2–3, 2008	John McCain 54%, Mitt Romney 25%, Mike Huckabee 7%, Ron Paul 6%, Other 3%, Undecided 6%
Strategic Vision (note) Sampling Size: 600; Margin of Error: ±4.5%	February 1–3, 2008	John McCain 55%, Mitt Romney 25%, Mike Huckabee 10%, Ron Paul 4%, Undecided 6%
Quinnipiac University Sampling Size: 350; Margin of Error: ±5.2%	January 30 – February 3, 2008	John McCain 52%, Mitt Romney 30%, Mike Huckabee 6%, Ron Paul 6%, Other 1%, Undecided 5%
McClatchy/MSNBC/Mason Dixon Sampling Size: 400; Margin of Error: ±5%	January 30 – February 1, 2008	John McCain 46%, Mitt Romney 31%, Mike Huckabee 5%, Ron Paul 4%, Undecided 12%
Monmouth University/Gannett Sampling Size: 555; Margin of Error: ±4%	January 30 – February 1, 2008	John McCain 55%, Mitt Romney 23%, Mike Huckabee 7%, Ron Paul 3%, Undecided 12%
Survey USA Sampling Size: 456; Margin of Error: ±4.7%	January 30–31, 2008	John McCain 48%, Mitt Romney 25%, Mike Huckabee 9%, Ron Paul 7%, Other 7%, Don't Know 5%
Rasmussen Reports Sampling Size: 785	January 30, 2008	John McCain 43%, Mitt Romney 29%, Mike Huckabee 7%, Ron Paul 6%, Other 9%, Don't Know 5%
Quinnipiac University Sampling Size: 398; Margin of Error: ±4.9%	January 15–22, 2008	John McCain 29%, Rudy Giuliani 26%, Mitt Romney 14%, Mike Huckabee 9%, Fred Thompson 9%, Ron Paul 7%, Don't Know 4%
Rasmussen Reports Sampling Size: 616; Margin of Error: ±4%	January 15, 2008	John McCain 29%, Rudy Giuliani 27%, Mike Huckabee 10%, Mitt Romney 10%, Fred Thompson 6%, Ron Paul 5%, Other 5%, Don't Know 8%
Monmouth University/Gannett Sampling Size: 400; Margin of Error: 4.9%	January 9–13, 2008	John McCain 29%, Rudy Giuliani 25%, Mike Huckabee 11%, Mitt Romney 9%, Ron Paul 5%, Fred Thompson 5%, Don't Know 16%
Research 2000/The Record Sampling Size: 400; Margin of Error: ±5%	January 9–10, 2008	Rudy Giuliani 34%, John McCain 18%, Mitt Romney 11%, Mike Huckabee 8%, Ron Paul 8%, Undecided 17%
Quinnipiac University Margin of Error: ±5.5% Sample Size: 320	December 5–9, 2007	Rudy Giuliani 38%, John McCain 12%, Mike Huckabee 8%, Mitt Romney 7%, Fred Thompson 4%, Ron Paul 2%, Duncan Hunter 1%, Tom Tancredo -%, Other 1%, Undecided 23%, Not Voting 2%
Quinnipiac University	October 9–15, 2007	Rudy Giuliani 48%, Fred Thompson 12%, John McCain 12%, Mitt Romney 7%, Paul 2%, Huckabee 1%, Brownback 1%, Tancredo 1%, Hunter -%, Other 1%, Undecided 13%
Monmouth University/Gannett New Jersey Poll	September 27–30, 2007	Rudy Giuliani 44%, John McCain 12%, Fred Thompson 10%, Mitt Romney 8%, Mike Huckabee 2%, Ron Paul 1%, Tom Tancredo 1%, Sam Brownback 0%, Duncan Hunter 0%, Don't know 20%
Strategic Vision (note)	September 28–30, 2007	Rudy Giuliani 53%, Fred Thompson 11%, Mitt Romney 7%, John McCain 7%, Paul 3%, Tancredo 2%, Huckabee 2%, Hunter 1%, Undecided 14%
Quinnipiac University	September 18–23, 2007	Rudy Giuliani 45%, Fred Thompson 12%, John McCain 8%, Mitt Romney 6%, Newt Gingrich 4%, Paul 3%, Huckabee 2%, Brownback -%, Hunter -%, Tancredo -%, Other 2%, Undecided 14%
Strategic Vision (R)	August 24–26, 2007	Rudy Giuliani 51%, Fred Thompson 12%, Mitt Romney 9%, John McCain 7%, Newt Gingrich 3%, Ron Paul 3%, Tom Tancredo 2%, Mike Huckabee 2%, Duncan Hunter 1%, Undecided 10%
Strategic Vision (R)	July 13–15, 2007	Rudy Giuliani 48%, Fred Thompson 15%, John McCain 10%, Mitt Romney 5%, Newt Gingrich 4%, Ron Paul 2%, Tancredo 2%, Huckabee 1%, T. Thompson 1%, Gilmore 1%, Hunter 1%, Undecided 10%
Quinnipiac University	June 26 – July 2, 2007	Rudy Giuliani 46%, John McCain 11%, Fred Thompson 9%, Mitt Romney 7%, Newt Gingrich 6%, Brownback 1%, Huckabee 1%, Paul 1%, T. Thompson 1%, Gilmore -, Hunter -, Tancredo -, Other 1%, Undecided 14%
Strategic Vision (R)	April 25–27, 2007	Rudy Giuliani 49%, John McCain 15%, Fred Thompson 7%, Mitt Romney 6%, Newt Gingrich 4%, Tom Tancredo 2%, Jim Gilmore 1%, Chuck Hagel 1%, Mike Huckabee 1%, Duncan Hunter 1%, Ron Paul 1%, Tommy Thompson 1%, Sam Brownback 1%, Undecided 11%
Monmouth University	April 11–16, 2007	Rudy Giuliani 49%, John McCain 19%, Mitt Romney 6%, Tommy Thompson 2%, Sam Brownback 1%, Mike Huckabee 1%, Jim Gilmore -, VOL-Fred Thompson 1%, Don't Know 21%
American Research Group	March 29 – April 2, 2007	Rudy Giuliani 38%, John McCain 23%, Newt Gingrich 10%, Mitt Romney 8%, Fred Thompson 8%, George Pataki 3%, Sam Brownback 0%, Jim Gilmore 0%, Chuck Hagel 0%, Mike Huckabee 0%, Duncan Hunter 0%, Ron Paul 0%, Tommy Thompson 0%, Tom Tancredo 0%, Undecided 9%
Quinnipiac University	January 16–22, 2007	Rudy Giuliani 39%, John McCain 21%, Newt Gingrich 11%, Mitt Romney 5%, George Pataki 3%, Sam Brownback 1%, Jim Gilmore 1%, Mike Huckabee 1%, Duncan Hunter 1%, Someone Else 1%, Wouldn't Vote 3%, Undecided 13%

=== New Mexico ===
New Mexico Winner: John McCain
Primary Date: June 3, 2008
See also

Poll Source	Date	Highlights
New Mexico State University	Apr 3–7, 2007	Rudy Giuliani 34%, John McCain 23%, Mitt Romney 9%
American Research Group	January 11–13, 2007	Rudy Giuliani 38%, John McCain 20%, Newt Gingrich 9%, Mitt Romney 7%, Chuck Hagel 6%, Sam Brownback 4%, George Pataki 1%, Jim Gilmore 0%, Mike Huckabee 0%, Duncan Hunter 0%, Tommy Thompson 0%, Undecided 15%

=== New York ===
New York Winner: John McCain
Primary Date: February 5, 2008

See also

Poll Source	Date	Highlights
Primary results Sampling Size: 607,011	February 5, 2008	John McCain 51.2%, Mitt Romney 27.8%, Mike Huckabee 10.8%, Ron Paul 6.4%, Rudy Giuliani 3.1%, Fred Thompson 0.3%, Duncan Hunter 0.2%, Others 0.2%
Survey USA Sampling Size: 356; Margin of Error: ±5.3%	February 2–3, 2008	John McCain 56%, Mitt Romney 23%, Mike Huckabee 8%, Ron Paul 4%, Other 3%, Undecided 6%
Quinnipiac University Sampling Size: 370; Margin of Error: ±5.1%	January 30 – February 3, 2008	John McCain 54%, Mitt Romney 22%, Mike Huckabee 9%, Ron Paul 5%, Other 1%, Undecided 8%
Rasmussen Reports Sampling Size: 524; Margin of Error: ±4%	January 31 – February 1, 2008	John McCain 49%, Mitt Romney 30%, Mike Huckabee 8%, Ron Paul 4%, Other/Undecided 9%
WNBC/Marist College Sampling Size: 409; Margin of Error: ±5%	January 30–31, 2008	John McCain 61%, Mitt Romney 24%, Mike Huckabee 6%, Ron Paul 5%, Undecided 4%
Survey USA Sampling Size: 462; Margin of Error: ±4.6%	January 30–31, 2008	John McCain 55%, Mitt Romney 21%, Mike Huckabee 7%, Ron Paul 4%, Other 8%, Undecided 5%
USA Today/Gallup Sampling Size: 412; Margin of Error: ±5%	January 23–26, 2008	John McCain 40%, Rudy Giuliani 21%, Mitt Romney 17%, Mike Huckabee 11%, Ron Paul 3%, Alan Keyes 1%, Other 2%, Undecided 5%
Quinnipiac University Sampling Size: 331; Margin of Error: ±5.4%	January 14–21, 2008	John McCain 30%, Rudy Giuliani 30%, Mitt Romney 9%, Mike Huckabee 8%, Fred Thompson 8%, Ron Paul 4%, Other 1%, Undecided 9%
Zogby Sampling Size: 280; Margin of Error: ±6%	January 19–20, 2008	John McCain 24%, Rudy Giuliani 21%, Mitt Romney 14%, Mike Huckabee 7%, Fred Thompson 7%, Ron Paul 2%, Other 5%, Undecided 20%
WNBC/Marist College Sampling Size: 401; Margin of Error: ±5%	January 15–17, 2008	John McCain 34%, Rudy Giuliani 23%, Mitt Romney 15%, Mike Huckabee 11%, Fred Thompson 5%, Ron Paul 2%, Undecided 10%
Siena College Sampling Size: 174; Margin of Error: ±7.4%	January 14–17, 2008	John McCain 36%, Rudy Giuliani 24%, Mitt Romney 10%, Mike Huckabee 7%, Fred Thompson 6%
Survey USA Sampling Size: 471; Margin of Error: ±4.6%	January 9–10, 2008	Rudy Giuliani 32%, John McCain 29%, Mike Huckabee 12%, Mitt Romney 7%, Fred Thompson 6%, Ron Paul 3%, Other/Undecided 12%
Quinnipiac Sample Size: 335; Margin of Error: ± 5.4%	December 4–10, 2007	Rudy Giuliani 34%, Mike Huckabee 12%, John McCain 11%, Fred Thompson 7%, Ron Paul 5%, Mitt Romney 5%, Tom Tancredo 1%
Datamar	December 2–8, 2007	Rudy Giuliani 35.7%, Mike Huckabee 13.8%, John McCain 11.3%, Mitt Romney 9.9%, Fred Thompson 7.1%, Ron Paul 3.5%, Tom Tancredo 1.4%, Duncan Hunter 0.9%, Undecided 16.6%
Datamar	November 1–5, 2007	Rudy Giuliani 38.8%, Mitt Romney 11.8%, Fred Thompson 9.9%, John McCain 9.6%, Mike Huckabee 7.8%, Ron Paul 3.0%, Duncan Hunter 1.7%, Tom Tancredo 1.0%, Undecided 16.5%
Quinnipiac	October 9–15, 2007	Rudy Giuliani 45%, Fred Thompson 12%, John McCain 9%, Mitt Romney 7%, Mike Huckabee 1%, Ron Paul 1%, Sam Brownback -%, Tom Tancredo -%, Duncan Hunter -%, Someone Else 5%, Wouldn't Vote 5%, Don't Know/Not Applicable 15%
Quinnipiac University	September 24–30, 2007	Rudy Giuliani 48%, John McCain 8%, Fred Thompson 8%, Newt Gingrich 5%, Mitt Romney 5%, Sam Brownback 1%, Mike Huckabee 1%, Ron Paul 1%, Tom Tancredo 1%, Duncan Hunter <1%, Someone Else 3%, Wouldn't Vote 4%, Don't Know/Not Applicable 17%
Siena College	July 24–28, 2007	Rudy Giuliani 40%, John McCain 13%, Fred Thompson 11%, Newt Gingrich 9%, Mitt Romney 7%, Undecided 21%
Siena College	June 18–21, 2007	Rudy Giuliani 48%, John McCain 13%, Fred Thompson 11%, Mitt Romney 6%, Newt Gingrich 4%
Quinnipiac University	June 12–17, 2007	Rudy Giuliani 46%, Fred Thompson 14%, John McCain 8%, Newt Gingrich 6%, Mitt Romney 3%, Brownback 1%, Huckabee 1%, Gilmore -, Hunter -, Paul -, Tancredo -, T. Thompson -, Other 4%, Undecided 14%
Siena College	May 18–25, 2007	Rudy Giuliani 52%, John McCain 14%, Mitt Romney 7%, Tommy Thompson 4%, Paul 2%, Brownback 1%, Gilmore 1%, Huckabee 1%, Tancredo 1%, Hunter -, Pataki -, Unsure 17%
Siena College (Frontrunners)	May 18–25, 2007	Rudy Giuliani 50%, John McCain 12%, Fred Thompson 8%, Newt Gingrich 7%, Mitt Romney 7%, Unsure 15%
NY1	April 4–7, 2007	Rudy Giuliani 56%, John McCain 15%, Mitt Romney 5%, T. Thompson 3%, Brownback 1%, Other 1%, Not Sure 16%
American Research Group	March 29 – April 2, 2007	Rudy Giuliani 50%, John McCain 14%, Mitt Romney 7%, Fred Thompson 7%, Newt Gingrich 6%, George Pataki 3%, Sam Brownback 0%, Jim Gilmore 0%, Chuck Hagel 0%, Mike Huckabee 0%, Duncan Hunter 0%, Ron Paul 0%, Tommy Thompson 0%, Tom Tancredo 0%, Undecided 14%
Quinnipiac University	Mar 29 – April 1, 2007	Rudy Giuliani 52%, McCain 13%, Pataki 6%, Romney 4%, Gingrich 3%, F. Thompson 3%, Brownback 1%, Hagel 1%, Gilmore -, Huckabee -, Hunter -, Paul -, Tancredo -, T. Thompson -, Other 2%, Unsure 12%
Siena College	March 26, 2007	Rudy Giuliani 48%, John McCain 16%, Newt Gingrich 8%, George Pataki 7%, Mitt Romney 6%, Sam Brownback 1%, Unsure 14%
WNBC/Marist	Mar 20–22, 2007	Rudy Giuliani 48%, John McCain 21%, Newt Gingrich 7%, Fred Thompson 5%, Mitt Romney 2%, Tommy Thompson 1%, Chuck Hagel 1%, Tom Tancredo 1%, Sam Brownback 1%, Ron Paul <1%, John Cox <1%, Mike Huckabee <1%, Duncan Hunter <1%, Undecided 13%
Quinnipiac University	Feb 6–11, 2007	Rudy Giuliani 51%, John McCain 17%, George Pataki 7%, Newt Gingrich 6%, Mike Huckabee 2%, Mitt Romney 1%, Duncan Hunter 1%, Chuck Hagel 1%, Tom Tancredo 1%

=== North Carolina ===
North Carolina Winner: John McCain
Primary Date: May 6, 2008
See also

Poll Source	Date	Highlights
Primary Result Sampling Size: 518,208	May 6, 2008	John McCain 73.6%, Mike Huckabee 12.1%, Ron Paul 7.8%, Alan Keyes 2.6%, Others 3.9%
Survey USA Sampling Size: 436; Margin of Error: ±4.8%	February 11, 2008	John McCain 45%, Mike Huckabee 40%, Ron Paul 5%, Someone Else 5%, Undecided 5%
Survey USA Sampling Size: 485; Margin of Error: ±4.5%	January 12–14, 2008	Mike Huckabee 28%, John McCain 27%, Fred Thompson 15%, Rudy Giuliani 10%, Mitt Romney 10%, Ron Paul 3%, Someone Else 2%, Undecided 5%
Public Policy Polling (D)	December 3, 2007	Mike Huckabee 33%, Rudy Giuliani 17%, Fred Thompson 16%, Mitt Romney 9%, John McCain 8%, Ron Paul 3%, Someone Else 3%, Undecided 10%
Public Policy Polling (D)	November 5, 2007	Fred Thompson 24%, Rudy Giuliani 19%, Mitt Romney 10%, John McCain 8%, Other 14%, Undecided 25%
Civitas Institute	October 9–14, 2007	Rudy Giuliani 21%, Fred Thompson 19%, Mitt Romney 16%, Other 13%, Undecided 24%
Public Policy Polling (D)	October 3, 2007	Fred Thompson 31%, Rudy Giuliani 20%, Mitt Romney 11%, John McCain 11%, Other 8%, Undecided 20%
Elon University Polling	Sept. 24–27, 2007	Fred Thompson 27.9%, Rudy Giuliani 21.0%, John McCain 12.2%, Mitt Romney 8.4%, Mike Huckabee 2.0%, Ron Paul 1.4%, Sam Brownback 0.4, Tom Tancredo 0.4%, Other 1.6%, Undecided 24.7%
Public Policy Polling (D)	September 5, 2007	Fred Thompson 34%, Rudy Giuliani 16%, Mitt Romney 13%, John McCain 7%, Other 7%, Undecided 22%
Public Policy Polling (D)	August 1–2, 2007	Fred Thompson 30%, Rudy Giuliani 20%, Mitt Romney 12%, John McCain 7%, Other 5%, Undecided 23%
Public Policy Polling (D)	July 2, 2007	Fred Thompson 34%, Rudy Giuliani 15%, Newt Gingrich 13%, John McCain 7%, Mitt Romney 6%, Other 5%, Undecided 21%
Civitas Institute poll conducted by Tel Opinion Research (R)	June 13–15, 2007	Rudy Giuliani 24%, Fred Thompson 24%, John McCain 16%, Mitt Romney 6%
Public Policy Polling (D) Margin of Error: +/- 3.9% Sampling Size: 603	June 4, 2007	Fred Thompson 37%, Rudy Giuliani 25%, John McCain 14%, Mitt Romney 14%
Public Policy Polling (D)	May 1–3, 2007	Rudy Giuliani 32%, Fred Thompson 25%, John McCain 14%, Mitt Romney 14%
Public Policy Polling (D)	April 2, 2007	Rudy Giuliani 30%, John McCain 19%, Mitt Romney 14%, Other 25%, Undecided 13%
Public Policy Polling (D)	March 5, 2007	Rudy Giuliani 32%, Newt Gingrich 26%, John McCain 17%, Mitt Romney 7%, Other 10%, Undecided 8%
Elon University	Feb 18–22, 2007	Rudy Giuliani 17%, John McCain 15%, Bill Frist 6%, Mitt Romney 2%
American Research Group	January 4–7, 2007	Rudy Giuliani 34%, John McCain 26%, Newt Gingrich 11%, Mike Huckabee 4%, Chuck Hagel 2%, Mitt Romney 2%, Jim Gilmore 1%, Undecided 19%

=== North Dakota ===
North Dakota Winner: Mitt Romney
Caucus Date: February 5, 2008

Poll Source	Date	Highlights
Caucus results Sampling Size: 9785	February 5, 2008	Mitt Romney 35.7%, John McCain 22.7%, Ron Paul 21.3%, Mike Huckabee 19.9%, Others 0.4%

=== Ohio ===
Ohio Winner: John McCain
Primary Date: March 4, 2008
See also

Poll Source	Date	Highlights
Survey USA Sampling Size: 478; Margin of Error: ±4.5%	February 17–18, 2008	John McCain 61%, Mike Huckabee 29%, Ron Paul 5%, Other 4%, Undecided 2%
Rasmussen Reports Sampling Size: 668; Margin of Error: ±4%	February 13, 2008	John McCain 50%, Mike Huckabee 33%, Ron Paul 5%, Undecided 12%
Survey USA Sampling Size: 524; Margin of Error: ±4.4%	February 10–11, 2008	John McCain 50%, Mike Huckabee 36%, Ron Paul 6%, Other 5%, Undecided 2%
Columbus Dispatch Sampling Size: 2156; Margin of Error: ±2%	January 23–31, 2008	John McCain 28%, Mitt Romney 22%, Mike Huckabee 14%, Rudy Giuliani 6%, Ron Paul 3%, Fred Thompson 2%, Unsure 25%
Quinnipiac University	November 26 – December 3, 2007	Rudy Giuliani 29%, John McCain 13%, Mike Huckabee 10%, Mitt Romney 7%, Fred Thompson 7%, Ron Paul 4%, Duncan Hunter 1%, Tom Tancredo -, Someone Else 4%, Wouldn't Vote 3%, Unsure 21%
Quinnipiac University	November 6–11, 2007	Rudy Giuliani 27%, John McCain 14%, Fred Thompson 13%, Mitt Romney 11%, Mike Huckabee 7%, Ron Paul 2%, Duncan Hunter 1%, Tom Tancredo 1%, Someone Else 1%, Wouldn't Vote 2%, Unsure 20%
Quinnipiac University	Oct 1–8, 2007	Rudy Giuliani 29%, Fred Thompson 17%, John McCain 10%, Mitt Romney 8%, Mike Huckabee 5%, Ron Paul 1%, Duncan Hunter 1%, Sam Brownback 1%, Tom Tancredo 1%, Someone Else 3%, Wouldn't Vote 3%, Unsure 22%
Strategic Vision (note)	Sept 14–16, 2007	Rudy Giuliani 34%, Fred Thompson 21%, John McCain 9%, Mitt Romney 8%, Newt Gingrich 5%, Mike Huckabee 4%, Ron Paul 3%, Tom Tancredo 2%, Sam Brownback 2%, Duncan Hunter 1%, Undecided 11%
Quinnipiac University	Aug 28 – September 3, 2007	Rudy Giuliani 21%, Fred Thompson 15%, John McCain 10%, Newt Gingrich 9%, Mitt Romney 8%, Mike Huckabee 3%, Ron Paul 2%, Duncan Hunter 1%, Sam Brownback 1%, Tom Tancredo 1%, Someone Else 4%, Wouldn't Vote 2%, Unsure 25%
Quinnipiac University	July 30 – August 6, 2007	Rudy Giuliani 26%, Fred Thompson 19%, John McCain 11%, Newt Gingrich 8%, Mitt Romney 8%, Tommy Thompson 2%, Mike Huckabee 1%, Ron Paul 1%, Duncan Hunter 1%, Sam Brownback 0%, Jim Gilmore 0%, Tom Tancredo 0%, Someone Else 2%, Wouldn't Vote 4%, Unsure 22%
Quinnipiac University	July 3–9, 2007	Rudy Giuliani 24%, Fred Thompson 18%, John McCain 14%, Mitt Romney 8%, Newt Gingrich 5%, Mike Huckabee 2%, Sam Brownback 1%, Jim Gilmore 1%, Ron Paul 1%, Tommy Thompson 1%, Duncan Hunter -, Tom Tancredo -, Someone Else 3%, Wouldn't Vote 2%, Unsure 20%
Quinnipiac University	June 18–22, 2007	Rudy Giuliani 25%, Fred Thompson 17%, John McCain 16%, Mitt Romney 7%, Newt Gingrich 6%, Mike Huckabee 2%, Tommy Thompson 1%, Ron Paul -, Tom Tancredo -, Sam Brownback -, Jim Gilmore -, Duncan Hunter -, Someone Else 3%, Wouldn't Vote 3%, Unsure 22%
Quinnipiac University	May 8–13, 2007	Rudy Giuliani 23%, John McCain 17%, Fred Thompson 15%, Mitt Romney 11%, Newt Gingrich 6%, Mike Huckabee 2%, Tommy Thompson 2%, Sam Brownback -, Jim Gilmore -, Chuck Hagel -, Duncan Hunter -, Pataki -, Tancredo -, Other 2%, Wouldn't Vote 2%, Unsure 18%
Quinnipiac University	Mar 13–19, 2007	Rudy Giuliani 31%, John McCain 20%, Newt Gingrich 8%, Fred Thompson 6%, Mitt Romney 6%, Jim Gilmore 1%, Chuck Hagel 1%, Mike Huckabee 1%, Tom Tancredo 1%, Tommy Thompson 1%, Sam Brownback 0%, Duncan Hunter 0%, Ron Paul 0%, George Pataki 0%, Someone else 1%, Wouldn't Vote 1%, Undecided 23%
Quinnipiac University	Feb 25 – March 1, 2007	Rudy Giuliani 35%, John McCain 18%, Newt Gingrich 13%, Mitt Romney 3%, Tommy Thompson 2%, Jim Gilmore 1%, Chuck Hagel 1%, Duncan Hunter 1%, Tom Tancredo 1%, Sam Brownback 0%, Mike Huckabee 0%, Ron Paul 0%, George Pataki 0%, Someone else 3%, Wouldn't Vote 1%, Undecided 16%
Quinnipiac University	January 30, 2007	Rudy Giuliani 30%, John McCain 22%, Newt Gingrich 11%, Mitt Romney 4%, Sam Brownback 1%, Tommy Thompson 1%, Chuck Hagel 1%, Mike Huckabee 1%, George Pataki 1%, Tom Tancredo 1%, Duncan Hunter 0%, Jim Gilmore 0%, Someone Else 5%, Wouldn't Vote 2%, Don't Know 19%

=== Oklahoma ===
Oklahoma Winner: John McCain
Primary Date: February 5, 2008
See also

Poll Source	Date	Highlights
Primary results Sampling Size: 335,603	February 5, 2008	John McCain 36.7%, Mike Huckabee 33.4%, Mitt Romney 24.8%, Ron Paul 3.3%, Rudy Giuliani 0.7%, Fred Thompson 0.6%, Duncan Hunter 0.1%, Tom Tancredo 0.1%, Others 0.4%
Survey USA Sampling Size: 445; Margin of Error: ±4.7%	February 2–3, 2008	John McCain 37%, Mike Huckabee 32%, Mitt Romney 23%, Ron Paul 3%, Other 2%, Undecided 2%
Tulsa World/KOTV Sampling Size: 306; Margin of Error: ±5.6%	January 27–30, 2008	John McCain 40%, Mike Huckabee 19%, Mitt Romney 17%, Rudy Giuliani 5%, Ron Paul 3%, Other 2%, Undecided 14%
Survey USA Sampling Size: 502; Margin of Error: ±4.5%	January 27, 2008	John McCain 37%, Mike Huckabee 28%, Mitt Romney 19%, Rudy Giuliani 6%, Ron Paul 6%, Other 2%, Undecided 3%
Survey USA Sampling Size: 501; Margin of Error: ±4.5%	January 11–13, 2008	Mike Huckabee 31%, John McCain 29%, Fred Thompson 13%, Rudy Giuliani 11%, Mitt Romney 8%, Ron Paul 3%, Other 1%, Undecided 5%
Tulsa World/KOTV Oklahoma Poll Sample Size: 338; Margin of Error: ± 5.33%	December 16–19, 2007	Mike Huckabee 29%, John McCain 17%, Rudy Giuliani 11%, Mitt Romney 9%, Fred Thompson 8%, Ron Paul 3%, Duncan Hunter 1%, Don't Know/Refused 22%
Tulsa World/KOTV Oklahoma Poll	May 16, 2007	Rudy Giuliani 32%, John McCain 23%, Fred Thompson 15%, Mitt Romney 6%, Sam Brownback 5%, Mike Huckabee 2%, Chuck Hagel 2%, Tommy Thompson 2%, Undecided 13%
American Research Group	February 8–13, 2007	Rudy Giuliani 37%, John McCain 21%, Mike Huckabee 14%, Newt Gingrich 3%, Jim Gilmore 2%, Mitt Romney 2%, Sam Brownback 0%, Chuck Hagel 0%, Duncan Hunter 0%, George Pataki 0%, Ron Paul 0%, Tom Tancredo 0%, Tommy Thompson 0%, Undecided 21%

=== Oregon ===
Oregon Winner: To Be Determined Primary Date: May 20, 2008

Poll Source	Date	Highlights
Riley Research Margin of Error: +/- 7.9% Sampling Size: 153	January 21–29, 2008	John McCain 30%, Mitt Romney 21%, Mike Huckabee 16%, Rudy Giuliani 8%, Ron Paul 3%, Unsure 19%
Riley Research Margin of Error: +/- 4.86% Sampling Size: 406	Aug 10–15, 2007	Rudy Giuliani 16%, Mitt Romney 15%, Fred Thompson 11%, John McCain 8%, Mike Huckabee 3%, Tommy Thompson 2%, Sam Brownback 1%, Ron Paul 1%, Tom Tancredo 1%, Refused 1%, Other 13%, Undecided 35%
Riley Research	March 14, 2007	Rudy Giuliani 33%, John McCain 20%, Newt Gingrich 6%, Mitt Romney 5%, Mike Huckabee 2%, Ron Paul 1%, Tommy Thompson 1%, Tom Tancredo 0%, Refused 1%, Miscellaneous 4%, Undecided 25%

=== Pennsylvania ===
Pennsylvania Winner: John McCain
Primary Date: Tuesday, April 22, 2008

See also

Poll Source	Date	Highlights
Franklin and Marshall College Sampling Size: 277; Margin of Error: ±3.9%	January 8–14, 2008	John McCain 30%, Rudy Giuliani 14%, Mike Huckabee 12%, Fred Thompson 8%, Mitt Romney 7%, Ron Paul 2%, Duncan Hunter 1%, Other 2%, Don't Know 24%
Quinnipiac University	November 26 – December 3, 2007	Rudy Giuliani 27%, Mike Huckabee 13%, John McCain 13%, Mitt Romney 6%, Fred Thompson 6%, Ron Paul 4%, Duncan Hunter 1%, Tom Tancredo -%, Other 3%, Wouldn't Vote 3%, Unsure 23%
Quinnipiac University	Oct 31 – November 5, 2007	Rudy Giuliani 29%, John McCain 12%, Fred Thompson 11%, Mitt Romney 7%, Mike Huckabee 6%, Ron Paul 4%, Duncan Hunter 1%, Tom Tancredo -%, Other 2%, Wouldn't Vote 4%, Unsure 23%
Quinnipiac University	Oct 1–8, 2007	Rudy Giuliani 32%, Fred Thompson 13%, John McCain 13%, Mitt Romney 8%, Ron Paul 4%, Mike Huckabee 2%, Duncan Hunter 1%, Sam Brownback -%, Tom Tancredo -%, Other 3%, Wouldn't Vote 2%, Unsure 20%
Strategic Vision (note)	Sept 28–30, 2007	Rudy Giuliani 45%, Fred Thompson 15%, John McCain 8%, Mitt Romney 7%, Ron Paul 3%, Tom Tancredo 2%, Mike Huckabee 2%, Sam Brownback 1%, Duncan Hunter 1%, Undecided 16%
Keystone Poll	Aug 24 – September 2, 2007	Rudy Giuliani 32%, John McCain 19%, Mitt Romney 12%, Fred Thompson 11%, Undecided 23%
Quinnipiac University	Aug 14–20, 2007	Rudy Giuliani 31%, John McCain 13%, Newt Gingrich 9%, Fred Thompson 8%, Mitt Romney 7%, Ron Paul 2%, Sam Brownback 2%, Mike Huckabee 2%, Tom Tancredo 1%, Duncan Hunter -, Other 2%, Wouldn't Vote 2%, Unsure 23%
Quinnipiac University	July 30 – August 6, 2007	Rudy Giuliani 29%, John McCain 16%, Fred Thompson 14%, Newt Gingrich 9%, Ron Paul 3%, Mitt Romney 3%, Sam Brownback 1%, Mike Huckabee 1%, Tommy Thompson 1%, Duncan Hunter 1%, Jim Gilmore 0%, Tom Tancredo 0%, Other 2%, Wouldn't Vote 4%, Unsure 16%
Strategic Vision (R)	July 6–8, 2007	Rudy Giuliani 42%, Fred Thompson 16%, John McCain 10%, Mitt Romney 6%, Newt Gingrich 4%, Sam Brownback 2%, Mike Huckabee 2%, Ron Paul 2%, Tom Tancredo 2%, Gilmore 1%, Hunter 1%, Tommy Thompson 1%, Undecided 11%
Quinnipiac University	June 18–25, 2007	Rudy Giuliani 29%, John McCain 15%, Fred Thompson 15%, Newt Gingrich 5%, Mitt Romney 3%, Sam Brownback 1%, Jim Gilmore 1%, Mike Huckabee 1%, Tommy Thompson 1%, Duncan Hunter -, Ron Paul -, Tom Tancredo -, Other 3%, Wouldn't Vote 3%, Unsure 24%
WTAE/Pittsburgh Tribune-Review Keystone	May 29 – June 4, 2007	Rudy Giuliani 29%, John McCain 29%, Mitt Romney 12%, Other 6%, Don't Know 24%
Quinnipiac University	May 22–28, 2007	Rudy Giuliani 28%, John McCain 11%, Fred Thompson 10%, Mitt Romney 9%, Gingrich 8%, Brownback 1%, Huckabee 1%, Pataki 1%, Paul 1%, Tancredo 1%, Gilmore -, Hagel -, Hunter -, Tommy Thompson -, Other 2%, Unsure 23%
Strategic Vision (R)	April 13–15, 2007	Rudy Giuliani 44%, John McCain 17%, Fred Thompson 10%, Newt Gingrich 5%, Mitt Romney 3%, Sam Brownback 2%, Tom Tancredo 1%, Huckabee 1%, T. Thompson 1%, Gilmore 1%, Hunter 1%, Paul 1%, Hagel 1%, Undecided 11%
Quinnipiac University	Mar 19–25, 2007	Rudy Giuliani 33%, John McCain 18%, Newt Gingrich 7%, Fred Thompson 6%, Mitt Romney 5%, Sam Brownback 1%, Mike Huckabee 1%, Duncan Hunter 1%, George Pataki 1%, Jim Gilmore 0%, Chuck Hagel 0%, Ron Paul 0%, Tom Tancredo 0%, Tommy Thompson 0%, Other 3%, Unsure 22%
Strategic Vision (note)	Mar 16–18, 2007	Rudy Giuliani 45%, John McCain 20%, Newt Gingrich 7%, Mitt Romney 5%, Sam Brownback 3%, Tom Tancredo 2%, Chuck Hagel 1%, Jim Gilmore 1%, Mike Huckabee 1%, Duncan Hunter 1%, Ron Paul 1%, Tommy Thompson 1%, Undecided 12%
Quinnipiac University	Feb 25 – March 1, 2007	Rudy Giuliani 43%, John McCain 17%, Newt Gingrich 8%, Mitt Romney 6%, Sam Brownback 1%, Chuck Hagel 1%, George Pataki 1%, Jim Gilmore 0%, Mike Huckabee 0%, Duncan Hunter 0%, Ron Paul 0%, Tom Tancredo 0%, Tommy Thompson 0%, Someone else 1%, Wouldn't Vote 3%, Undecided 18%
Quinnipiac University	Feb 1–5, 2007	Rudy Giuliani 30%, John McCain 20%, Newt Gingrich 14%, Mitt Romney 4%, Sam Brownback 2%, Chuck Hagel 1%, Duncan Hunter 1%, Mike Huckabee 1%, Someone Else 4%, Wouldn't Vote 3%, Undecided 20%
American Research Group Margin of Error: +/- 4% Sample Size: 600 (528 R, 72 I)	January 4–8, 2007	Rudy Giuliani 35%, John McCain 25%, Newt Gingrich 10%, Chuck Hagel 4%, Sam Brownback 2%, Jim Gilmore 1%, Mike Huckabee 1%, Mitt Romney 1%, Undecided 21%

=== Rhode Island ===
Rhode Island Winner: John McCain
Primary Date: March 4, 2008
See also

Poll Source	Date	Highlights
American Research Group Margin of Error: +/- 4% Sample Size: 600 (215 R, 385 I)	April 25 – May 2, 2006	John McCain 50%, Mitt Romney 14%, Newt Gingrich 4%, George Pataki 1%, Chuck Hagel <.5%, George Allen 0%, Sam Brownback 0%, Bill Frist 0%, Mike Huckabee 0%, Undecided 31%
American Research Group	Feb 2006	John McCain 45%, Mitt Romney 17%, Newt Gingrich 6%, Bill Frist 2%, George Pataki 1%, Undecided 29%

=== South Carolina ===
South Carolina Winner: John McCain
Primary Date: January 19, 2008

See also

Poll Source	Date	Highlights
Primary results Sampling Size: 431,196	January 19, 2008	John McCain 33.2%, Mike Huckabee 29.9%, Fred Thompson 15.7%, Mitt Romney 15.1%, Ron Paul 3.7%, Rudy Giuliani 2.1%, Duncan Hunter .2%
American Research Group Sampling Size: 600; Margin of Error: ±4%	January 17–18, 2008	Mike Huckabee 33%, John McCain 26%, Fred Thompson 21%, Mitt Romney 9%, Rudy Giuliani 3%, Ron Paul 2%, Duncan Hunter 1%, Alan Keyes 1%, Undecided 4%
Reuters/C-SPAN/Zogby Sampling Size: 817; Margin of Error: ±3.4%	January 17–18, 2008	John McCain 27%, Mike Huckabee 26%, Mitt Romney 16%, Fred Thompson 12%, Ron Paul 4%, Rudy Giuliani 3%
Insider Advantage Sampling Size: 635; Margin of Error: ±3–4%	January 17, 2008	Mike Huckabee 26%, John McCain 25.7%, Mitt Romney 12.9%, Fred Thompson 12.7%, Rudy Giuliani 5.2%, Ron Paul 4.8%, Duncan Hunter 2.5%, Undecided 10.3%
Survey USA Sampling Size: 699; Margin of Error: ±3.8%	January 16–17, 2008	John McCain 31%, Mike Huckabee 27%, Mitt Romney 17%, Fred Thompson 16%, Ron Paul 5%, Rudy Giuliani 2%, Other 1%, Undecided 2%
Fox News/Opinion Dynamics Sampling Size: 500; Margin of Error: ±4%	January 16–17, 2008	John McCain 27%, Mike Huckabee 20%, Mitt Romney 15%, Fred Thompson 11%, Ron Paul 4%, Rudy Giuliani 3%, Duncan Hunter 1%, Other 1%, Undecided 19%
Reuters/C-SPAN/Zogby Sampling Size: 815; Margin of Error: ±3.4%	January 15–17, 2008	John McCain 29%, Mike Huckabee 22%, Mitt Romney 15%, Fred Thompson 13%, Ron Paul 4%, Rudy Giuliani 2%, Undecided 9%
Survey USA Sampling Size: 470; Margin of Error: ±4.6%	January 16, 2008	John McCain 29%, Mike Huckabee 26%, Mitt Romney 17%, Fred Thompson 17%, Ron Paul 5%, Rudy Giuliani 3%, Other 2%, Undecided 2%
Rasmussen Reports Sampling Size: 895; Margin of Error: ±3%	January 16, 2008	Mike Huckabee 24%, John McCain 24%, Mitt Romney 18%, Fred Thompson 16%, Ron Paul 5%, Rudy Giuliani 3%, Undecided 7%
American Research Group Sampling Size: 600; Margin of Error: ±4%	January 15–16, 2008	John McCain 33%, Mike Huckabee 23%, Mitt Romney 20%, Fred Thompson 13%, Rudy Giuliani 4%, Alan Keyes 2%, Duncan Hunter 1%, Ron Paul 1%, Undecided 3%
MSNBC/Mason Dixon/McClatchy Sampling Size: 400; Margin of Error: ±5%	January 14–16, 2008	John McCain 27%, Mike Huckabee 25%, Mitt Romney 15%, Fred Thompson 13%, Ron Paul 6%, Rudy Giuliani 5%, Duncan Hunter 1%, Undecided 8%
Reuters/C-SPAN/Zogby Sampling Size: 813; Margin of Error: ±3.4%	January 14–16, 2008	John McCain 29%, Mike Huckabee 22%, Fred Thompson 14%, Mitt Romney 12%, Ron Paul 5%, Rudy Giuliani 5%, Undecided 10%
Reuters/C-SPAN/Zogby Sampling Size: 813; Margin of Error: ±3.4%	January 13–15, 2008	John McCain 29%, Mike Huckabee 23%, Mitt Romney 13%, Fred Thompson 12%, Ron Paul 6%, Rudy Giuliani 5%, Some Other Candidate 4%, Will Not Vote/Undecided 10%
Clemson University Sampling Size: 450; Margin of Error: ±4.6%	January 9–15, 2008	John McCain 29%, Mike Huckabee 22%, Mitt Romney 13%, Fred Thompson 10%, Ron Paul 6%, Rudy Giuliani 3%, Undecided 17%
Rasmussen Reports Sampling Size: 911; Margin of Error: ±3%	January 13, 2008	John McCain 28%, Mike Huckabee 19%, Mitt Romney 17%, Fred Thompson 16%, Rudy Giuliani 5%, Ron Paul 5%, Some Other Candidate 2%, Undecided 8%
Fox News/Opinion Dynamics Sampling Size: 500; Margin of Error: ±4%	January 9, 2008	John McCain 25%, Mike Huckabee 18%, Mitt Romney 17%, Fred Thompson 9%, Rudy Giuliani 5%, Ron Paul 5%, Duncan Hunter 1%, Other 1%, Don't Know 19%
Rasmussen Reports Sampling Size: 785; Margin of Error: ±4%	January 9, 2008	John McCain 27%, Mike Huckabee 24%, Mitt Romney 16%, Fred Thompson 12%, Rudy Giuliani 6%, Ron Paul 5%, Some Other Candidate 3%, Not Sure 6%
Insider Advantage Sampling Size: 479; Margin of Error: ±4%	January 7, 2008	Mike Huckabee 33%, John McCain 21%, Mitt Romney 14%, Rudy Giuliani 8%, Ron Paul 5%, Fred Thompson 5%, Duncan Hunter 1%, No Opinion 13%
Rasmussen Reports Sampling Size: 882; Margin of Error: ±4%	January 6, 2008	Mike Huckabee 28%, John McCain 21%, Mitt Romney 15%, Fred Thompson 11%, Rudy Giuliani 10%, Ron Paul 4%, Other 2%, Undecided 9%
Survey USA Sampling Size: 658; Margin of Error: ±3.9%	January 4–6, 2008	Mike Huckabee 36%, Mitt Romney 19%, John McCain 17%, Fred Thompson 11%, Rudy Giuliani 9%, Ron Paul 5%, Other 1%, Undecided 3%
SurveyUSA Sample Size: 593; Margin of Error: ±4.1%	December 17–18, 2007	Mike Huckabee 28%, Mitt Romney 18%, John McCain 16%, Fred Thompson 15%, Rudy Giuliani 12%, Other 7%, Undecided 4%
CBS News Sample Size: 447; Margin of Error: ±5%	December 13–17, 2007	Mike Huckabee 28%, Mitt Romney 20%, Rudy Giuliani 12%, John McCain 11%, Fred Thompson 10%, Ron Paul 3%
Rasmussen Reports Poll Sample Size: 724; Margin of Error: ± 4%	December 16, 2007	Mike Huckabee 23%, Mitt Romney 23%, Fred Thompson 12%, John McCain 12%, Rudy Giuliani 11%, Ron Paul 5%, Some other candidate 2%
CNN	December 9–12, 2007	Mike Huckabee 24%, Fred Thompson 17%, Mitt Romney 16%, Rudy Giuliani 16%, John McCain 13%, Ron Paul 11%, Undecided 3%
Survey USA Poll	December 7–9, 2007	Mike Huckabee 30%, Mitt Romney 19%, Fred Thompson 18%, Rudy Giuliani 13%, John McCain 10%, Other 6%, Undecided 3%
Mason-Dixon Poll	December 3–6, 2007	Mike Huckabee 20%, Rudy Giuliani 17%, Mitt Romney 15%, Fred Thompson 14%, John McCain 10%, Ron Paul 4%, Tom Tancredo 1%, Alan Keyes 1%, Duncan Hunter 0%, Undecided 18%
Rasmussen Reports Poll	December 3–4, 2007	Mike Huckabee 25%, Fred Thompson 18%, Mitt Romney 18%, Rudy Giuliani 12%, John McCain 9%, Ron Paul 4%, Some other candidate 2%
Insider Advantage Poll	December 3–4, 2007	Mike Huckabee 23%, Fred Thompson 17%, Rudy Giuliani 17%, Mitt Romney 14%, John McCain 10%, Ron Paul 6%, Duncan Hunter 1%, Tom Tancredo 1%, Undecided 11%
American Research Group	November 26–29, 2007	Rudy Giuliani 23%, Mitt Romney 21%, Mike Huckabee 18%, Fred Thompson 13%, John McCain 10%, Ron Paul 3%, Duncan Hunter 2%, Tom Tancredo -%, Alan Keyes -%, Undecided 10%
Clemson University Palmetto Poll Sampling Size: 450; Margin of Error: +/- 4.62%	November 14–27, 2007	Mitt Romney 17%, Fred Thompson 15%, Mike Huckabee 13%, John McCain 11%, Rudy Giuliani 9%, Ron Paul 6%, Duncan Hunter 1%, Tom Tancredo 0%, Undecided 28%
Rasmussen	November 20, 2007	Mitt Romney 21%, Fred Thompson 21%, Rudy Giuliani 13%, Mike Huckabee 12%, John McCain 9%, Ron Paul 8%, Duncan Hunter 2%, Tom Tancredo 2%, Undecided 13%
Ayers, McHenry & Associates	November 19, 2007	Mitt Romney 20%, Rudy Giuliani 19%, John McCain 17%, Fred Thompson 13%, Mike Huckabee 8%, Ron Paul 3%, Duncan Hunter 1%, Tom Tancredo 0%, Undecided 18%
Survey USA	November 9–11, 2007	Rudy Giuliani 26%, Mitt Romney 20%, Fred Thompson 18%, John McCain 14%, Mike Huckabee 12%, Other 6%, Undecided 4%
American Research Group	October 26–29, 2007	Mitt Romney 29%, Rudy Giuliani 23%, John McCain 13%, Fred Thompson 10%, Mike Huckabee 5%, Ron Paul 4%, Duncan Hunter 2%, Tom Tancredo 1%, Alan Keyes 1%, Undecided 12%
Winthrop/ETV Poll	October 7–28, 2007	Fred Thompson 17.9%, Mitt Romney 16.5%, Rudy Giuliani 16.5%, John McCain 9.2%, Mike Huckabee 5.4%, Ron Paul 2.1%, Duncan Hunter 0.8%, Tom Tancredo 0.6%, Sam Brownback 0.2%, Undecided 29.9%
Insider Advantage	October 2, 2007	Fred Thompson 21%, Rudy Giuliani 16%, John McCain 16%, Mitt Romney 16%, Mike Huckabee 11%, Ron Paul 3%, Duncan Hunter 2%, Sam Brownback 2%, No Opinion 13%
American Research Group	September 26–29, 2007	Mitt Romney 26%, Rudy Giuliani 23%, John McCain 15%, Fred Thompson 10%, Newt Gingrich 7%, Ron Paul 2%, Sam Brownback 1%, Mike Huckabee 1%, Duncan Hunter 1%, Tom Tancredo 1%, Alan Keyes -, Undecided 13%
Rasmussen	September 26–27, 2007	Fred Thompson 24%, Rudy Giuliani 20%, Mitt Romney 15%, John McCain 11%, Mike Huckabee 3%, Others 5%, Undecided 22%
Los Angeles Times/Bloomberg Poll	September 6–10, 2007	Fred Thompson 26%, Rudy Giuliani 23%, John McCain 15%, Mitt Romney 9%, Mike Huckabee 6%, Ron Paul 2%, Tom Tancredo 1%, Sam Brownback 1%, Duncan Hunter 1%, Undecided 13%
American Research Group	August 26–29, 2007	Rudy Giuliani 26%, Fred Thompson 21%, John McCain 12%, Mike Huckabee 9%, Mitt Romney 9%, Newt Gingrich 6%, Sam Brownback 2%, Ron Paul 2%, Tancredo 1%, Hunter -, Undecided 12%
Clemson University Palmetto Poll	August 20–29, 2007	Fred Thompson 19%, Rudy Giuliani 18%, John McCain 15%, Mitt Romney 11%, Newt Gingrich 9%, Mike Huckabee 6%, Ron Paul 1%, Sam Brownback -, Tancredo -, Hunter -, Undecided 20%
Rasmussen Reports	August 20, 2007	Fred Thompson 23%, Rudy Giuliani 21%, John McCain 14%, Mitt Romney 10%, Mike Huckabee 6%, Others 3%, Undecided 22%
Public Policy Polling (D)	August 13, 2007	Fred Thompson 21%, Rudy Giuliani 18%, Mitt Romney 17%, John McCain 11%, Mike Huckabee 7%, Sam Brownback 3%, Ron Paul 2%, Duncan Hunter 1%, Tom Tancredo 1%, Undecided 18%
American Research Group	July 26–30, 2007	Rudy Giuliani 28%, Fred Thompson 27%, John McCain 10%, Mitt Romney 7%, Mike Huckabee 3%, Ron Paul 3%, Duncan Hunter 1%, Tom Tancredo 1%, Sam Brownback -, Tommy Thompson -, Undecided 13%
CNN/Opinion Research (Without Gingrich)	July 16–18, 2007	Rudy Giuliani 28% (30%), John McCain 20% (21%), Fred Thompson 17% (18%), Newt Gingrich 6%, Mitt Romney 4% (6%), Tommy Thompson 4%, Mike Huckabee 3%, Hunter 2%, Paul 2%, Tancredo 2%, Brownback 1%, Undecided 11%
American Research Group	June 26–30, 2007	John McCain 23%, Rudy Giuliani 22%, Fred Thompson 19%, Mitt Romney 8%, Mike Huckabee 3%, Hunter 2%, Brownback 1%, Gilmore 1%, Tancredo 1%, Undecided 14%
Mason Dixon	June 13–15, 2007	Fred Thompson 25%, Rudy Giuliani 21%, Mitt Romney 11%, John McCain 7%, Mike Huckabee 5%, Brownback 1%, Hunter 1%, Thompson 1%, Gilmore -, Tancredo -, Paul -, Undecided 28%
Public Policy Polling (D)	May 31, 2007	Mitt Romney 31%, Fred Thompson 15%, Newt Gingrich 10%, John McCain 9%, Rudy Giuliani 8%, Tommy Thompson 5%, Sam Brownback 4%, Mike Huckabee 4%, Tom Tancredo 4%, Ron Paul 2%, Duncan Hunter 1%, Jim Gilmore 0%, Undecided 8%
Winthrop/ETV	May 16–27, 2007	Rudy Giuliani 18.6%, John McCain 14.4%, Mitt Romney 11.7%, Fred Thompson 6.4%, Newt Gingrich 3.4%, Brownback 1.5%, Hunter 1.1%, Huckabee .8%, Tommy Thompson .8%, Hagel .4%, Unsure 29.9%
American Research Group	May 23–25, 2007	John McCain 32%, Rudy Giuliani 23%, Fred Thompson 13%, Mitt Romney 10%, Newt Gingrich 6%, Brownback 1%, Gilmore 1%, Hagel 1%, Huckabee 1%, Tancredo 1%, Tommy Thompson 1%, Hunter -, Pataki -, Paul -, Undecided 11%
Insider Advantage	May 21–22, 2007	Rudy Giuliani 18%, Newt Gingrich 17%, John McCain 17%, Fred Thompson 13%, Mitt Romney 8%, Mike Huckabee 6%, Duncan Hunter 4%, Sam Brownback 3%, Duncan Hunter 3%, Gilmore 1%, Ron Paul 1%, Undecided/Don't Know 13%
Insider Advantage/Majority Opinion	May 8–9, 2007	Rudy Giuliani 22%, Newt Gingrich 15%, Mitt Romney 10%, John McCain 9%, Fred Thompson 8%, Sam Brownback 4%, Duncan Hunter 4%, Mike Huckabee 1%, Ron Paul 1%, Undecided/Don't Know 26%
WIS-TV/Ayres McHenry (R)	May 5–8, 2007	John McCain 25%, Rudy Giuliani 20%, Fred Thompson 16%, Newt Gingrich 12%, Mitt Romney 8%, Mike Huckabee 2%, Sam Brownback 1%, Jim Gilmore 1%, Chuck Hagel 1%, Duncan Hunter 1%, Tom Tancredo 1%, Tommy Thompson 1%, Undecided 13%
American Research Group	April 27–30, 2007	John McCain 36%, Rudy Giuliani 23%, Fred Thompson 10%, Mitt Romney 6%, Newt Gingrich 6%, Mike Huckabee 2%, Sam Browback 1%, Jim Gilmore 1%, Chuck Hagel 1%, Tom Tancredo 1%, Tommy Thompson 1%, Duncan Hunter -, George Pataki -, Ron Paul -, Undecided 12%
Hamilton Beattie (D)/Ayres McHenry (R)	April 14–19, 2007	John McCain 24%, Rudy Giuliani 15%, Newt Gingrich 12%, Fred Thompson 11%, Mitt Romney 10%, Sam Brownback 2%, Jim Gilmore 1%, Chuck Hagel 1%, Duncan Hunter 1%, Tom Tancredo 1%, Tommy Thompson <1%, Undecided 22%
NewsChannel 15-Zogby	April 16–17, 2007	John McCain 22%, Rudy Giuliani 19%, Fred Thompson 11%, Mitt Romney 10%, Mark Sanford 8%
Insider Advantage/Majority Opinion	April 9–10, 2007	Rudy Giuliani 18%, John McCain 17%, Newt Gingrich 16%, Mitt Romney 14%, Fred Thompson 9%, Jim Gilmore 4%, Sam Brownback 3%, Mike Huckabee 2%, Duncan Hunter 1%, Ron Paul 1%, Undecided/Don't Know 15%
Fox News/Opinion Dynamics	April 1–3, 2007	Rudy Giuliani 26%, John McCain 25%, Mitt Romney 14%, Newt Gingrich (vol) 5%, Brownback 2%, Fred Thompson (vol) 2%, T. Thompson 2%, Gilmore 1%, Hunter 1%, Paul 1%, Tancredo 1%, Chuck Hagel (vol) -, Other 1%, Don't Know 16%
Elon University	Feb 18–22, 2007	John McCain 38.1%, Rudy Giuliani 14.3%, Mitt Romney 4.8%, Newt Gingrich 4.8%, Undecided 38.1%
Whit Ayres	January 24–28, 2007	John McCain 29%, Rudy Giuliani 20%, Newt Gingrich 14%, Mitt Romney 6%, Sam Brownback 2%, Mike Huckabee 2%, Duncan Hunter 2%, Tom Tancredo 1%, Undecided 23%
American Research Group	Dec 21–23, 2006	John McCain 35%, Rudy Giuliani 28%, Newt Gingrich 15%, Mitt Romney 5%, Mike Huckabee 1%, Undecided 16%

=== Tennessee ===
Tennessee Winner: Mike Huckabee
Primary Date: February 5, 2008

Poll Source	Date	Highlights
Primary results Sampling Size: 550,502	February 5, 2008	Mike Huckabee 34.1%, John McCain 31.5%, Mitt Romney 24.3%, Ron Paul 5.6%, Fred Thompson 2.9%, Rudy Giuliani 0.9%, Uncommitted 0.3%, Duncan Hunter 0.1%, Others 0.2%
InsiderAdvantage Sampling Size: 474	February 2, 2008	John McCain 31.9%, Mike Huckabee 29.5%, Mitt Romney 22.1%, Ron Paul 6%, Other 3%, Undecided 7.4%
Rasmussen Reports Sampling Size: 531; Margin of Error: ±4.5%	January 30, 2008	John McCain 32%, Mitt Romney 29%, Mike Huckabee 23%, Ron Paul 8%, Other 5%
InsiderAdvantage Sampling Size: 375	January 30, 2008	John McCain 33%, Mike Huckabee 25%, Mitt Romney 18%, Ron Paul 9%, Other 2%, Undecided 13%
WSMV-TV/Crawford, Johnson and Northcott Sampling Size: 409; Margin of Error: ±5%	January 28–29, 2008	Mike Huckabee 24%, John McCain 23%, Mitt Romney 18%, Ron Paul 4%, Rudy Giuliani 3%, Other 2%, Undecided 26%
WSMV/Crawford, Johnson and Northcott Sampling Size: 500; Margin of Error: ±5%	January 19–21, 2008	Fred Thompson 25%, Mike Huckabee 24%, John McCain 12%, Mitt Romney 7%, Rudy Giuliani 2%, Ron Paul 2%, Undecided 26%
InsiderAdvantage	Mar 31 – Apr 1, 2007	Fred Thompson 45%, Rudy Giuliani 15%, Newt Gingrich 11%, John McCain 10%, Undisclosed Remaining Percent 19%

=== Texas ===
Texas Winner: John McCain
Primary Date: March 4, 2008
See also

Poll Source	Date	Highlights
Survey USA Sampling Size: 505; Margin of Error: ± 4.5%	February 16–18, 2008	John McCain 50%, Mike Huckabee 37%, Ron Paul 7%, Other 4%, Undecided 2%
CNN Sampling Size: 553; Margin of Error: ± 4%	February 15–17, 2008	John McCain 55%, Mike Huckabee 32%, Ron Paul 11%, Undecided 2%
Rasmussen Reports Sampling Size: 796; Margin of Error: ± 4%	February 14, 2008	John McCain 45%, Mike Huckabee 37%, Ron Paul 7%, Undecided 11%
American Research Group Sampling Size: 600; Margin of Error: ± 4%	February 13–14, 2008	John McCain 42%, Mike Huckabee 36%, Ron Paul 11%, Other 2%, Undecided 9%
Texas Credit Union League/Public Opinion Strategies Sampling Size: 400; Margin of Error: ± 4.9%	February 11–13, 2008	John McCain 45%, Mike Huckabee 41%, Ron Paul 6%, Undecided/Other 8%
IVR Polls Sampling Size: 510; Margin of Error: ± 4.3%	February 7, 2008	John McCain 43%, Mike Huckabee 33%, Ron Paul 9%, Alan Keyes 3%, Undecided 13%
IVR Polls Margin of Error: +/- 3.5% Sampling Size: 734	January 30–31, 2008	Mitt Romney 30%, John McCain 29%, Mike Huckabee 20%, Ron Paul 8%, Alan Keyes 3%, Undecided 10%
IVR Polls Margin of Error: +/- 3.6% Sampling Size: 735	January 10, 2008	Mike Huckabee 26%, John McCain 24%, Fred Thompson 12%, Mitt Romney 11%, Rudy Giuliani 10%, Ron Paul 4%, Duncan Hunter 3%, Alan Keyes 0%, Undecided 8% – Past GOP Primary voters
IVR Polls Margin of Error: +/- 4.2% Sampling Size: 535	December 12, 2007	Mike Huckabee 29%, Rudy Giuliani 16%, Fred Thompson 14%, Mitt Romney 14%, John McCain 7%, Ron Paul 6%, Tom Tancredo 3%, Duncan Hunter 2%, Alan Keyes 0%, Undecided 9% – Past GOP Primary voters
IVR Polls Margin of Error: +/- 4.4% Sampling Size: 500	November 15, 2007	Rudy Giuliani 23%, Mike Huckabee 16%, Fred Thompson 16%, Mitt Romney 12%, John McCain 9%, Ron Paul 5%, Tom Tancredo 3%, Duncan Hunter 3%, Alan Keyes 1%, Undecided 11% – Past GOP Primary voters
IVR Polls Margin of Error: +/- 4.3% Sampling Size: 532	October 18, 2007	Rudy Giuliani 24%, Fred Thompson 19%, Mike Huckabee 14%, Mitt Romney 14%, Tom Tancredo 7%, John McCain 6%, Ron Paul 6%, Duncan Hunter 4%, Alan Keyes 0%, Undecided 6% – Past GOP Primary voters
IVR Polls Margin of Error: +/- 4.1% Sampling Size: 570	August 29, 2007	Fred Thompson 25%, Rudy Giuliani 21%, Mitt Romney 15%, Mike Huckabee 13%, John McCain 8%, Ron Paul 5%, Other 8%, Undecided 5% – Past GOP Primary voters
IVR Polls Margin of Error: +/- 3.6% Sampling Size: 736	June 19, 2007	Fred Thompson 29%, Rudy Giuliani 21%, John McCain 13%, Mitt Romney 9%, Ron Paul 6%, Mike Huckabee 4%, Other 6%, Undecided 11% – Past GOP Primary voters
Texas Lyceum	April 26 – May 7, 2007	John McCain 27%, Rudy Giuliani 23%, Fred Thompson 11%, Newt Gingrich 6%, Mitt Romney 6%, Sam Brownback 3%, Tommy Thompson 1%, Hunter 1%, Paul 0%, Other 2%, Don't Know 20%
Baselice & Associates	April 16–19, 2007	Rudy Giuliani 24%, John McCain 19%, Fred Thompson 19%, Newt Gingrich 12%, Mitt Romney 8%
American Research Group Margin of Error: +/- 4% Sample Size: 600 (522 R, 78 I)	March 16–19, 2007	Rudy Giuliani 30%, John McCain 20%, Mitt Romney 13%, Fred Thompson 12%, Newt Gingrich 11%, Mike Huckabee 2%, Chuck Hagel 1%, Tom Tancredo 1%, Sam Brownback 0%, George Pataki 0%, Jim Gilmore 0%, Duncan Hunter 0%, Tommy Thompson 0%, Ron Paul 0%, Undecided 11%
Baselice & Associates	January 17–21, 2007	Rudy Giuliani 28%, John McCain 26%, Newt Gingrich 17%, Mitt Romney 6%, Sam Brownback 2%, Mike Huckabee 2%, George Pataki 1%, Chuck Hagel 1%, Undecided 18%

=== Utah ===
Utah Winner: Mitt Romney
Primary Date: February 5, 2008
See also

Poll Source	Date	Highlights
Primary results Sampling Size: 284,790	February 5, 2008	Mitt Romney 89.6%, John McCain 5.4%, Ron Paul 2.9%, Mike Huckabee 1.4%, Rudy Giuliani 0.3%, Fred Thompson 0.2%, Duncan Hunter 0.1%, Others 0.1%
Deseret Morning News/KSL-TV Margin of Error: ±6.5%	February 1, 2008	Mitt Romney 84%, John McCain 4%, Other/Undecided 12%
Deseret Morning News/KSL-TV	October 6, 2007	Mitt Romney 65%, Rudy Giuliani 8%, John McCain 6%, Fred Thompson 3%, Mike Huckabee 2%, Ron Paul 1%, Undecided 13%
American Research Group	Feb 8–13, 2007	Mitt Romney 40%, John McCain 21%, Rudy Giuliani 13%, Chuck Hagel 3%, Tommy Thompson 2%, Sam Brownback 1%, Duncan Hunter 1%, Undecided 32%

=== Vermont ===
Vermont Winner: John McCain
Primary Date: March 4, 2008
See also

Poll Source	Date	Highlights
American Research Group Margin of Error: +/- 4% Sample Size: 600 (353 R, 247 I)	Feb 2–6, 2007	John McCain 30%, Rudy Giuliani 29%, Newt Gingrich 9%, Mitt Romney 7%, Sam Brownback 1%, Chuck Hagel 1%, George Pataki 1%, Tom Tancredo 1%, Undecided 22%

=== Virginia ===
Virginia Winner: John McCain
Primary Date: February 12, 2008

Poll Source	Date	Highlights
Primary results Sampling Size: 484,392	February 12, 2008	John McCain 50%, Mike Huckabee 40.8%, Ron Paul 4.5%, Mitt Romney 3.5%, Fred Thompson 0.7%, Rudy Giuliani 0.4%
Survey USA Sampling Size: 385; Margin of Error: ± 5.1%	February 9–10, 2008	John McCain 48%, Mike Huckabee 37%, Ron Paul 7%, Other 6%, Undecided 2%
American Research Group Sampling Size: 600; Margin of Error: ± 4%	February 8–9, 2008	John McCain 54%, Mike Huckabee 32%, Ron Paul 5%, Other 4%, Undecided 5%
Richmond Times-Dispatch/Mason Dixon Sampling Size: 400; Margin of Error: ± 5%	February 7–8, 2008	John McCain 55%, Mike Huckabee 27%, Ron Paul 5%, Other/Undecided 13%
Survey USA Sampling Size: 382; Margin of Error: ± 5.1%	February 7–8, 2008	John McCain 57%, Mike Huckabee 25%, Ron Paul 9%, Other 7%, Undecided 3%
Washington Post	Oct 4–8, 2007	Rudy Giuliani 34%, John McCain 20%, Fred Thompson 19%, Mitt Romney 9%, Mike Huckabee 2%, Duncan Hunter 2%, Ron Paul 2%, Sam Brownback 1%, Tom Tancredo 1%
Elon University	Feb 18–22, 2007	John McCain 25%, Rudy Giuliani 6%, Mitt Romney 3%, Bill Frist 3%

=== Washington ===
Washington Winner: John McCain
Caucus Date: February 9, 2008
See also

Poll Source	Date	Highlights
Strategic Vision (note)	Oct 5–7, 2007	Rudy Giuliani 37%, Fred Thompson 20%, Mitt Romney 11%, John McCain 10%, Mike Huckabee 4%, Ron Paul 4%, Tom Tancredo 2%, Sam Brownback 1%, Duncan Hunter 1%, Undecided 10%
Strategic Vision (note)	November 2–4, 2006	Rudy Giuliani 42%, John McCain 23%, Mitt Romney 7%, Newt Gingrich 6%, Bill Frist 2%, George Allen 1%, Rick Santorum 1%, George Pataki 1%, Chuck Hagel 1%, Undecided 16%

=== West Virginia ===
West Virginia Winner: Mike Huckabee
Caucus Date: February 5, 2008
Primary Date: May 13, 2008
See also

Poll Source	Date	Highlights
Caucus results	February 5, 2008	Mike Huckabee 51.5%, Mitt Romney 47.4, John McCain 1.1%
American Research Group Margin of Error: +/- 4% Sample Size: 600 (527 R, 73 No Party)	March 29 – April 2, 2007	John McCain 33%, Rudy Giuliani 29%, Mitt Romney 8%, Newt Gingrich 6%, Fred Thompson 6%, Sam Brownback 0%, Jim Gilmore 0%, Chuck Hagel 0%, Mike Huckabee 0%, Duncan Hunter 0%, George Pataki 0%, Ron Paul 0%, Tommy Thompson 0%, Tom Tancredo 0%, Undecided 18%

=== Wisconsin ===
Wisconsin Winner: John McCain
Primary Date: February 19, 2008
See also

Poll Source	Date	Highlights
American Research Group Sample Size: 600; Margin of Error: ± 4%	February 17–18, 2008	John McCain 51%, Mike Huckabee 43%, Ron Paul 3%, Other 1%, Undecided 2%
Public Policy Polling Sample Size: 654; Margin of Error: ± 3.8%	February 16–17, 2008	John McCain 50%, Mike Huckabee 39%, Ron Paul 6%, Undecided 5%
American Research Group Sample Size: 600; Margin of Error: ± 4%	February 15–16, 2008	John McCain 46%, Mike Huckabee 42%, Ron Paul 4%, Other 1%, Undecided 7%
Research 2000/WISC-TV Madison Sample Size: 400; Margin of Error: ± 5%	February 13–14, 2008	John McCain 48%, Mike Huckabee 32%, Ron Paul 7%, Undecided 13%
Rasmussen Reports Sample Size: 526; Margin of Error: ± 4%	February 13, 2008	John McCain 51%, Mike Huckabee 30%, Ron Paul 7%, Undecided 12%
Public Policy Polling Sample Size: 700; Margin of Error: ± 3.7%	February 11, 2008	John McCain 53%, Mike Huckabee 32%, Ron Paul 7%, Undecided 9%
Strategic Vision (note) Sample Size: 800; Margin of Error: ± 3%	February 8–10, 2008	John McCain 45%, Mike Huckabee 27%, Ron Paul 7%, Undecided 21%
American Research Group Sample Size: 600; Margin of Error: ± 4%	February 6–7, 2008	John McCain 51%, Mitt Romney 29%, Ron Paul 7%, Mike Huckabee 4%, Other 1%, Undecided 8%
Strategic Vision (note) Margin of Error: +/- 3% Sample Size: 800	December 7–9, 2007	Rudy Giuliani 26%, Mike Huckabee 20%, Fred Thompson 12%, Mitt Romney 11%, John McCain 10%, Ron Paul 5%, Tom Tancredo 2%, Duncan Hunter 1%, Undecided 13%
Strategic Vision (note) Margin of Error: +/- 3% Sample Size: 800 Likely Voters; Only Republicans votes were counted.	September 14–16, 2007	Rudy Giuliani 28%, Fred Thompson 24%, John McCain 8%, Mitt Romney 7%, Newt Gingrich 6%, Ron Paul 3%, Mike Huckabee 3%, Tom Tancredo 2%, Sam Brownback 1%, Hunter 1%, Undecided 17%
Strategic Vision (R)	May 4–6, 2007	Rudy Giuliani 22%, Tommy Thompson 16%, John McCain 16%, Fred Thompson 10%, Newt Gingrich 8%, Mitt Romney 5%, Sam Brownback 2%, Tom Tancredo 2%, Ron Paul 2%, Mike Huckabee 1%, Chuck Hagel 1%, Jim Gilmore 1%, Hunter 1%, Undecided 13%
Strategic Vision (R)	November 2–4, 2006	Rudy Giuliani 35%, Tommy Thompson 26%, John McCain 17%, Mitt Romney 3%, Newt Gingrich 3%, Bill Frist 1%, Rick Santorum 1%, George Pataki 1%, George Allen 1%, Chuck Hagel 1%, Undecided 11%

=== Wyoming ===
Wyoming Winner: Mitt Romney
Caucus Date: January 5, 2008

Poll Source	Date	Highlights
Caucus results	January 5, 2008	Mitt Romney 67%, Fred Thompson 25%, Duncan Hunter 8%

=== Notes ===
- Strategic Vision is suspected of forging results.

== Summary ==
Sources: National Association of Secretaries of State
Using RCP averages when available

State	Delegates	Date of primary or caucus	Date of most recent poll	Leader	Leader %	has a ...	... lead over	Runner up	Runner up %
Iowa	40	2008-01-03	2008-01-03	Mike Huckabee	34.4%	9.2%	win	Mitt Romney	25.2%
Wyoming	14	2008-01-05	2008-01-05	Mitt Romney	66.7%	41.7%	win	Fred Thompson	25%
New Hampshire	12	2008-01-08	2008-01-08	John McCain	37.1%	5.5%	win	Mitt Romney	31.6%
Michigan†	30	2008-01-15	2008-01-15	Mitt Romney	38.9%	9.2%	win	John McCain	29.7%
Nevada	34	2008-01-19	2008-01-19	Mitt Romney	51.1%	37.4%	win	Ron Paul	13.7%
South Carolina	24	2008-01-19	2008-01-19	John McCain	33.2%	3.3%	win	Mike Huckabee	29.9%
Florida	57	2008-01-29	2008-01-29	John McCain	36%	4.9%	win	Mitt Romney	31.1%
Maine†	21	2008-02-01	2008-02-01	Mitt Romney	52%	30.9%	win	John McCain	21.1%
Alabama	48	2008-02-05	2008-02-05	Mike Huckabee	40.7%	3.5%	win	John McCain	37.2%
Alaska	29	2008-02-05	2008-02-05	Mitt Romney	44.1%	22.2%	win	Mike Huckabee	21.9%
Arizona	53	2008-02-05	2008-02-05	John McCain	47.4%	13.3%	win	Mitt Romney	34.1%
Arkansas	34	2008-02-05	2008-02-05	Mike Huckabee	60.3%	39.9%	win	John McCain	20.4%
California	173	2008-02-05	2008-02-05	John McCain	41.9%	7.8%	win	Mitt Romney	34.1%
Colorado	46	2008-02-05	2008-02-05	Mitt Romney	59.4%	40.4%	win	John McCain	19%
Connecticut	30	2008-02-05	2008-02-05	John McCain	52.1%	19.1%	win	Mitt Romney	33%
Delaware	18	2008-02-05	2008-02-05	John McCain	45%	12.5%	win	Mitt Romney	32.5%
Georgia	72	2008-02-05	2008-02-05	Mike Huckabee	34.0%	2.4%	win	John McCain	31.6%
Illinois	70	2008-02-05	2008-02-05	John McCain	47.4%	18.7%	win	Mitt Romney	28.7%
Massachusetts	43	2008-02-05	2008-02-05	Mitt Romney	51.3%	10.3%	win	John McCain	41%
Minnesota	41	2008-02-05	2008-02-05	Mitt Romney	41.4%	19.4%	win	John McCain	22%
Missouri	58	2008-02-05	2008-02-05	John McCain	33%	1.5%	win	Mike Huckabee	31.5%
Montana	25	2008-02-05	2008-02-05	Mitt Romney	38.3%	13.8%	win	Ron Paul	24.5%
New Jersey	52	2008-02-05	2008-02-05	John McCain	55.4%	27%	win	Mitt Romney	28.4%
New York	101	2008-02-05	2008-02-05	John McCain	51.2%	23.4%	win	Mitt Romney	27.8%
North Dakota	26	2008-02-05	2008-02-05	Mitt Romney	35.7%	13%	win	John McCain	22.7%
Oklahoma	41	2008-02-05	2008-02-05	John McCain	36.8%	3.7%	win	Mike Huckabee	33.1%
Tennessee	55	2008-02-05	2008-02-05	Mike Huckabee	34.5%	2.7%	win	John McCain	31.8%
Utah	36	2008-02-05	2008-02-05	Mitt Romney	89.6%	84.2%	win	John McCain	5.4%
West Virginia	30	2008-02-05 & 2008-05-13	2008-02-05	Mike Huckabee	51.5%	4.1%	win	Mitt Romney	47.4%
Kansas	39	2008-02-09	2008-02-09	Mike Huckabee	59.6%	36.1%	win	John McCain	23.5%
Louisiana	47	2008-02-09	2008-02-09	Mike Huckabee	43.2%	1.3%	win	John McCain	41.9%
Washington	40	2008-02-09 & 2008-02-19	2008-02-09	John McCain	25.7%	1.8%	win	Mike Huckabee	23.9%
District of Columbia	19	2008-02-12	2008-02-12	John McCain	67.7%	51.1%	win	Mike Huckabee	16.6%
Maryland	37	2008-02-12	2008-02-12	John McCain	55.1%	26%	strong	Mike Huckabee	29.1%
Virginia	63	2008-02-12	2008-02-12	John McCain	50%	9.2%	win	Mike Huckabee	40.8%
Wisconsin	40	2008-02-19	2008-02-14	John McCain	48%	16%	strong	Mike Huckabee	32%
Ohio	88	2008-03-04	2008-02-11	John McCain	50%	14%	strong	Mike Huckabee	36%
Rhode Island	20	2008-03-04	2006-05-02	John McCain	50%	36%	strong	Mitt Romney	14%
Texas	140	2008-03-04	2008-02-14	John McCain	45%	8%	strong	Mike Huckabee	37%
Vermont†	17	2008-03-04	2007-02-06	John McCain	30%	1%	weak	Rudy Giuliani	29%
Pennsylvania	74	2008-04-22	2008-01-14	John McCain	30%	16%	strong	Rudy Giuliani	14%
North Carolina	69	2008-05-06	2008-02-11	John McCain	45%	5%	weak	Mike Huckabee	40%
Oregon†	30	2008-05-20	2008-01-29	John McCain	30%	9%	weak	Mitt Romney	21%
Idaho	32	2008-05-27	2007-07-13	Mitt Romney	38%	18%	strong	Rudy Giuliani	20%
New Mexico	32	2008-06-03	2007-04-07	Rudy Giuliani	34%	11%	strong	John McCain	23%

== Current leaders ==
The race for the Republican nomination is decided upon how many delegates a candidate receives. In this section we see how many pledged delegates each candidate has received to date ranking from first place (the most delegates) to sixth place (the least delegates). To be nominated, a candidate must win an absolute majority of delegates, or 1,191 delegates.

- First Place: John McCain with 12 states and 709 pledged delegates.
  - Alabama (16)
  - Alaska (3)
  - Arkansas (1)
  - Arizona (50)₩
  - California (116)₩
  - Connecticut (27)₩
  - Delaware (18)₩
  - Florida (57)₩
  - Georgia (3)
  - Illinois (54)₩
  - Iowa (3)
  - Massachusetts (17)
  - Michigan (5)
  - Missouri (58)₩
  - New Hampshire (7)₩
  - New Jersey (52)₩
  - New York (101)₩
  - Nevada (4)
  - Oklahoma (32)₩
  - North Dakota (5)
  - South Carolina (19)₩
  - Tennessee (7)
- Second Place: Mitt Romney with 11 states and 269 pledged delegates.
  - Alaska (12)₩
  - Arkansas (1)
  - California (3)
  - Colorado (22)₩
  - Illinois (2)
  - Iowa (12)
  - Maine (18) ₩
  - Massachusetts (21)₩
  - Michigan (24)₩
  - Minnesota (36)₩
  - Montana (25)₩
  - Nevada (18)₩
  - New Hampshire (4)
  - North Dakota (8)₩
  - Tennessee (3)
  - Utah (36)₩
  - Wyoming (9)₩
- Third Place: Mike Huckabee with 6 states and 170 (167)*pledged delegates.
  - Alabama (20)₩
  - Alaska (6)
  - Arkansas (29)₩
  - Georgia (45)₩
  - Iowa (17)₩
  - New Hampshire (1)
  - Michigan (1)
  - Nevada (2)
  - North Dakota (5)
  - Oklahoma (6)
  - South Carolina (5)
  - Tennessee (12)₩
  - West Virginia (18/15)₩*
- Fourth Place: Ron Paul with no states and 16 (19)*pledged delegates.
  - Alaska (5)
  - Iowa (2)
  - Nevada (4)
  - North Dakota (5)
  - West Virginia (0/3)*

₩- Means the candidate has won that particular state

- According to local news reports, three of Mike Huckabee's delegates from West Virginia were promised to Ron Paul in exchange for support for Huckabee from Paul's caucus supporters in West Virginia.

All information comes from

== Predicted results ==
The numbers in parentheses indicate the number of convention delegates awarded to each state. A simple majority of delegate votes (1,191 out of 2,381) is needed to secure the nomination.

The number of convention delegates in Wyoming, New Hampshire, Michigan, South Carolina, and Florida have been cut in half due to scheduling their primary earlier than February 5. Source

- First place: John McCain with 26 states and 1390 delegates – projected nominee.
  - Arizona (53)₩
  - California (173)₩
  - Connecticut (30)₩
  - Delaware (18)₩
  - District of Columbia (19)₩
  - Florida (57)₩
  - Idaho (32)╬§
  - Illinois (70)₩
  - Maryland (37)₩
  - Missouri (58)₩
  - New Hampshire (12)₩
  - New Jersey (52)₩
  - New Mexico (32)╬§
  - New York (101)₩
  - Ohio (88)
  - Oklahoma (41)₩
  - Oregon (30)
  - North Carolina (69)
  - Pennsylvania (74)
  - Rhode Island (20)§
  - South Carolina (24)₩
  - Texas (140)
  - Vermont (17)†§
  - Virginia (63)₩
  - Washington (40)₩
  - Wisconsin (40)
- Second place: Mike Huckabee with 8 states and 365 delegates
  - Alabama (48)₩
  - Arkansas (34)₩
  - Georgia (72)₩
  - Iowa (40)₩
  - Kansas (39)₩
  - Louisiana (47)₩
  - Tennessee (55)₩
  - West Virginia (30)₩
- Third place: Mitt Romney with 11 states and 345 delegates
  - Alaska (29)₩
  - Colorado (46)₩
  - Maine (21)₩
  - Massachusetts (43)₩
  - Michigan (30)₩
  - Minnesota (41)₩
  - Montana (25)₩
  - Nevada (34)₩
  - North Dakota (26)₩
  - Utah (36)₩
  - Wyoming (14)₩

Notes:

- "†" indicates a lead within the margin of error or a tie.
- "╬" indicates a state where the top candidate has withdrawn from the race since the latest poll was conducted, thus the next most-supported active candidate is granted that state's delegates.
- "₩" indicates a state where the primary/caucus has been conducted and a winner has been declared.
- "§" indicates a state where the latest poll was conducted before January 1, 2008

== See also ==
- Nationwide opinion polling for the 2008 Republican Party presidential primaries
- Statewide opinion polling for the 2008 Democratic Party presidential primaries
