= Ron Paul 2008 presidential campaign =

American Presidential campaign

Ron Paul for President 2008
- Campaign: 2008 United States presidential election
- Candidate: Ron Paul; U.S. Representative from Texas (1976–1977) (1979–1985) (1997–2013)
- Affiliation: Republican Party
- Status: Announced March 12, 2007; Suspended June 12, 2008
- Headquarters: Lake Jackson, Texas
- Key people: Kent Snyder (chairman, deceased); Lew Moore (manager); Jesse Benton (press secretary)
- Receipts: US$28,100,000 (2007-12-31)
- Slogan: Hope for America

Website
- ronpaul2008.com (archived June 11, 2008)

In early 2007, Ron Paul, a congressman from Texas, announced his candidacy for the Republican Party's nomination for president of the United States in the 2008 election. Initial opinion polls during the first three quarters of 2007 showed him consistently receiving support from 3% or less of those polled. In 2008, Paul's support among Republican voters remained in the single digits, and well behind front-runner John McCain.

During the fourth quarter of 2007, Paul was the most successful Republican fundraiser, bringing in approximately $20 million. He also received the most money from the armed services of any candidate in the fourth quarter. His campaign set two fund-raising records: the largest single-day donation total among Republican candidates and twice receiving the most money received through the internet in a single day by any presidential candidate in American history. Paul's run for president is also noted for its grassroots social networking, facilitated by the Internet. Paul's enthusiastic supporters were noted by the media, who called them "Paulites". Paul received most of his contributions from individuals, at ninety-seven percent, compared to other candidates.

As of February 5, 2008, Paul had won sixteen delegates to his party's National Convention, placing him last among the four Republican candidates still in the race at that time. The campaign projected on February 6 to have secured at least 42 delegates to the national convention. On March 4, 2008, McCain earned enough pledged delegates to become the Republican presumptive nominee, but Paul decided to continue his run. Paul released The Revolution: A Manifesto on April 29, which collected essays based on thoughts that arose from his experiences running for president in 2008. The book went on to be the top bestseller among political books on Amazon.com and The New York Times nonfiction list.

On June 12, 2008, Paul announced that he was ending the presidential campaign, investing the more than $4.7 million of remaining campaign contributions to build up the new advocacy group Campaign for Liberty. Although he suspended his campaign, he appeared on the ballot in Montana and Louisiana in the general election. He was also listed in some states as a write-in candidate. He received over 47,000 votes, giving him the eighth-highest popular vote total in the election.

== Campaign developments ==
These are events related to Ron Paul's official 2008 campaign. For events related to the independent grassroots movement around him (the "Ron Paul Revolution"), see Grassroots campaign efforts.

=== First quarter 2007 ===
Paul formed a presidential exploratory committee on January 11. He also acquired data on public interest in his running for president around February 19. Based on the results from the exploratory committee and polling, Paul officially entered the race on March 12.

In a February CNN landline opinion poll, Paul was the candidate with the least name recognition besides John H. Cox. In March, Paul signed the American Freedom Agenda Pledge.

=== Second quarter 2007 ===
On June 30, 2007, in Des Moines, Iowa, Iowans for Tax Relief and the Iowa Christian Alliance invited all Democratic Party candidates and all Republican presidential candidates except Paul to a presidential candidates forum. Six candidates appeared: Mitt Romney, Sam Brownback, Jim Gilmore, Mike Huckabee, Tommy Thompson, and Tom Tancredo. In July, The New York Times wrote that Paul's "message draws on the noblest traditions of American decency and patriotism."

=== Third quarter 2007 ===
Paul participated in the Ames Straw Poll in Ames, Iowa on August 11. He ranked fifth out of 11 candidates, receiving 9.1 percent of the votes. According to John Fout, on TheStreet.com, Paul "shocked people in Iowa" by receiving more than 9 percent of the vote after making only three trips to Iowa, releasing ads only one week before the poll, and for beating Tommy Thompson, who visited all 99 counties in Iowa. In an interview about the results of the straw poll, fellow candidate Mike Huckabee, who placed second, said that Ron Paul was the candidate most likely to overtake him nationally, saying, "I'm keeping an eye on him."

During the Straw Poll his supporters gathered to form a parade, that marched hundreds of people some of whom bore colonial costumes and drum and fife instruments, flags and other around the ISU grounds for hours chanting back and forth slogans that would later be used in a number of marches and events throughout the campaign.

=== Fourth quarter 2007 ===
On October 25, work began among his supporters to commemorate the anniversary of the Boston Tea Party, starting with the website TeaParty07.com. In support of the rally, Paul supporters purchased a blimp to display campaign messages to observers. On December 16, 2007, Paul supporters re-enacted the dumping of tea into Boston Harbor by tossing banners that read "Tyranny" and "no taxation without representation" into boxes that were in the harbor. His supporters also gathered in several other cities as part of the Tea Party re-enactment, including Strasbourg, France, Santa Monica, California, Maui, Hawaii, and Freeport and Austin, Texas. Paul himself tossed a barrel labelled "Iraq War" overboard at the Tea Party Re-enactment in Freeport, Texas. The Austin Police Department estimates 2000 to 3000 attendees at the Austin Tea Party.

Paul's first major television campaign began November 8, at a total cost of US$1.1 million, started advertising in New Hampshire.

Mid November, 2007 Operation: Live Free or Die, An effort to bring volunteers to campaign door to door in New Hampshire was started by Google employee Vijay Boyapati. His idea to rent a few houses to hold volunteers turned into 14 houses with over 600 people arriving in New Hampshire to knock on doors, organize marches, phone bank at the Concord and Nashua Headquarters. Paul visited OLFD volunteers at a local restaurant owned by a member of the Free State Project called Murphy's Pub, a frequent establishment for FSP members, to thank them in person for their dedication.

On January 7, 2007, a number of these volunteers worked at polling stations across the state and later held a party which he attended and spoke. Many of these volunteers, including Vijay went on to other states to continue the efforts. On December 1, 2007, the Los Angeles Times declared Paul a player in the presidential campaign. The Libertarian Party adopted a resolution on December 9 urging Paul to run on the Libertarian ticket if he does not get nominated by the Republican Party.

In December 2007, the Associated Press reported that Paul kept a US$500 donation from Don Black, operator of Stormfront, a white nationalist organization website. Paul's campaign stated that "If someone with small ideologies happens to contribute money to Ron, thinking he can influence Ron in any way, he's wasted his money," responding that they would spend the money on spreading "the message of freedom" and "inalienable rights".

CBS News reported on December 21 that "Ron Paul can no longer be dismissed as the favorite of the fringe".

Many presidential candidates released apolitical Christmas-themed advertisements. Paul was the first nationally recognized candidate to post such an ad on YouTube. In the ad, Paul's family sings a rendition of "Deck the Halls" amid a brief narrative from Paul wishing the viewer "an absolutely great 2008". CBS News described it as portraying Paul as "warm and fuzzy", with fewer religious overtones than other candidates'.

Paul was questioned on Meet the Press by Tim Russert for asking that US$400 million in previously earmarked funds be directed back to his district for water projects, a nursing program, to expand a hospital cancer center and US$10 million to promote Texas shrimp. On Meet the Press, Paul defended his bid for the earmarked funds saying he never voted for an earmark in his life. Russert said Paul's statement was like saying, "you voted for it before you voted against it." Congressman Paul responded,"I put them in because I represent people who are asking for some of their money back, ... I'm against the tax system, but I take all my tax credits. I want to get their money back for the people."

=== First quarter 2008 ===
On January 7, Paul's campaign launched an eight-state TV ad campaign for California, Alabama, Colorado, Georgia, North Dakota, Louisiana, Maine and Florida. That was in addition to the campaigns in New Hampshire and South Carolina.

Also on January 15, James Giles, writing for The Bulletin of Philadelphia, said that Paul represented "the dominant foreign policy consensus in the Republican Party from 1920 to 1952."

Paul campaigned heavily in Nevada, more than Mitt Romney, the only other candidate to go there. On January 17, Paul's Nevada campaign representatives warned state GOP officials that thousands of caucus-goers had been given wrong caucus locations. A correction was put onto the Nevada GOP website that morning, two days before the caucuses. Then Paul's campaign criticized inconsistencies, confusion over rules, and a shortage of ballots in some counties. They asked the state Republican Party to consider postponing the vote because of those problems and others, such as unclear rules on who could vote.

In January, Paul released an economic revitalization plan and named Peter Schiff and Don Luskin economic advisors to the campaign. The National Taxpayers Union found that among the remaining presidential candidates, only Paul proposed sufficient federal spending cuts to more than offset new spending plans.

In February, suicide terrorism expert professor Robert Pape joined the campaign as foreign policy advisor; Ivan Eland and Leon Hadar also joined Paul's foreign policy team.

After Romney left the race in February, leaving John McCain strongly favored to win the nomination, Paul e-mailed his supporters on February 8 and stated that he was refactoring his presidential campaign to be "leaner and tighter" and would devote a significant portion of his time specifically to his campaign for reelection to the U.S. House, representing Texas's 14th congressional district, where Paul is being challenged for the Republican nomination by Friendswood mayor pro tem Chris Peden. Paul recognized a nearly zero chance of a brokered convention. He was determined to continue in every caucus and primary remaining and promised not to campaign for president for another party. Staffer Dan McCarthy clarified in a blog post on February 9 that Paul's presidential campaign "is not ending, not being suspended, and not even drawing down", stating that "[a] few news sources are misreporting Ron Paul's e-mail from last night."

On February 11, Paul posted a video via YouTube and his campaign website in which he states that he would like to organize a march on Washington in order to show the support he has received and give his campaign a boost in the presidential race.

On March 4, John McCain earned enough delegates to become the Republican nominee. Mike Huckabee dropped from the race as a result, but Paul decided to continue his run, having successfully defended his congressional seat.

On March 8, Paul released a video to his supporters acknowledging that he would not be able to win the nomination, interpreted by some news sources as a hint that the campaign was over. His son Rand Paul publicly denied the allegations and stated the campaign "will continue to contest the remaining primaries." On March 10, Paul appeared on CNN's American Morning to explain that he has not withdrawn from the race and he will keep campaigning to keep his ideas in the arena, and to fulfill an obligation to his supporters in states that have not yet held primaries.

It's not over; it's certainly winding down, there are a lot less primaries left. Super Tuesday has passed, and McCain has the nominal number. But if you're in a campaign for only gaining power, that's one thing. If you're in a campaign to influence ideas and the future of the country, the campaign is never over.

— Ron Paul, American Morning

==== Ron Paul newsletter controversy ====
In early 2007, several political commentators, including Ryan Sager of The New York Sun, David Weigel of Reason magazine, and blogger Edward Morrissey of Captain's Quarters, published articles discussing politically oriented newsletters that had been published under Paul's name in the 1980s and 1990s and that had been the subject of controversy in Paul's 1996 congressional campaign. However, at that early stage in the 2008 presidential campaign, the newsletters controversy attracted little attention.

That changed on January 8, 2008, the day of the New Hampshire primary, when The New Republic published a story by James Kirchick filled with quotes from the newsletters. Kirchick said that the writings showed "an obsession with conspiracies, sympathy for the right-wing militia movement, and deeply held bigotry", and were "saturated in racism", charges echoed by Kevin Drum of the Washington Monthly's Political Animal blog. Kirchick noted that one article referred to African-American rioters as "barbarians" and suggested that the Los Angeles riots of 1992 only stopped when it came time for "blacks to pick up their welfare checks". An article entitled "The Pink House" said that "homosexuals, not to speak of the rest of society, were far better off when social pressure forced them to hide their activities." Other issues gave tactical advice to local militia groups on how to evade detection by the authorities and advanced various conspiracy theories.

Paul denounced the reporting on these newsletters as "old news that has been rehashed for over a decade ... once again being resurrected for obvious political reasons." In a statement put out by his campaign, Paul said further that "the quotations in The New Republic article are not mine and do not represent what I believe or have ever believed. I have never uttered such words and denounce such small-minded thoughts." He blamed the articles on several ghostwriters who had contributed to the newsletters, which he said he did not edit, while he was busy practicing medicine full-time.

In an interview with CNN's Wolf Blitzer, Paul asserted that racism is incompatible with his beliefs and that he sees people as individuals, not as part of collectives. He also dismissed the attack as an attempt to accuse him of racism by proxy, claiming that he had collected more money among African Americans than any other Republican candidate.

=== Second quarter 2008 ===
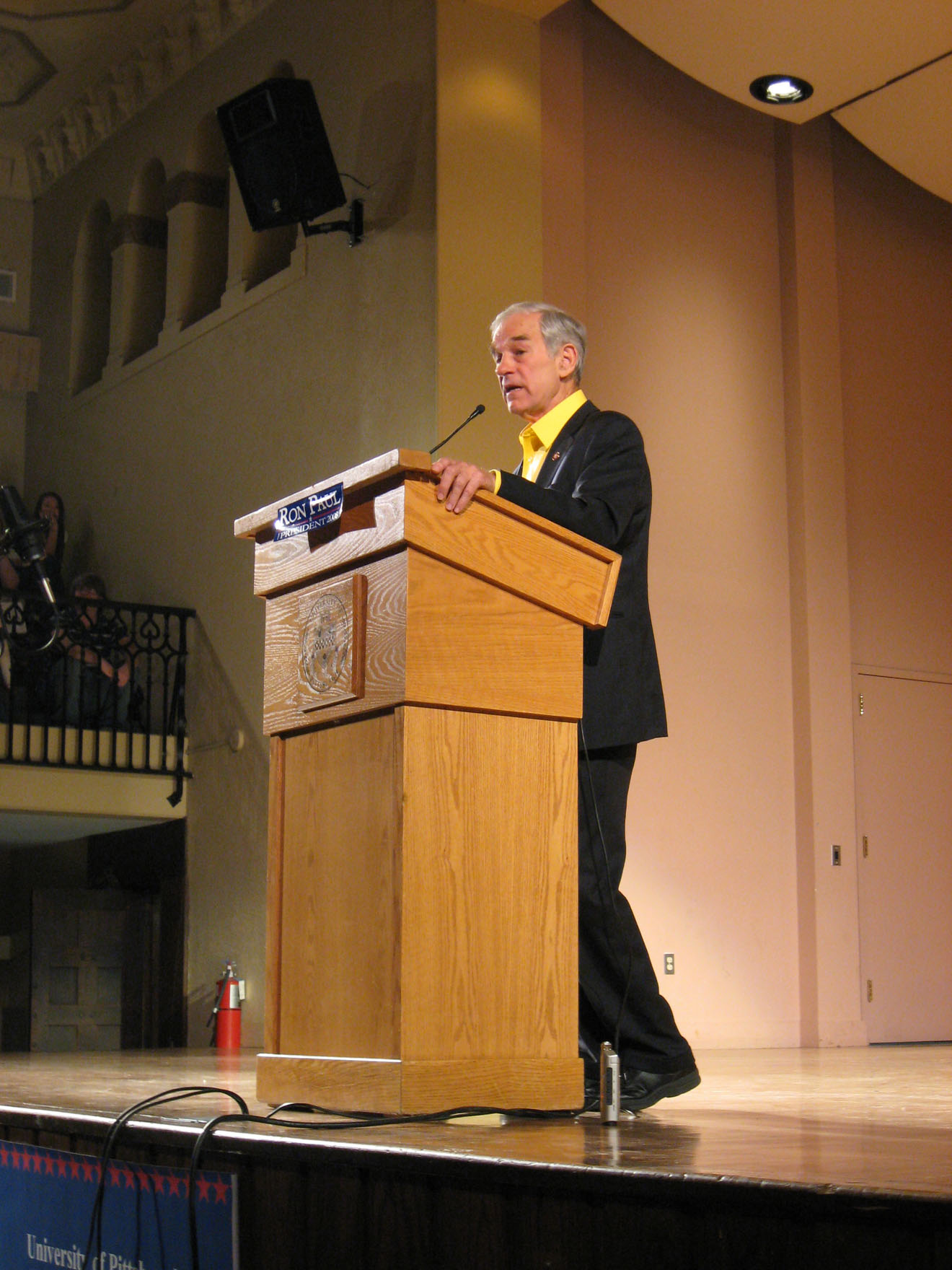
Ron Paul was invited to speak at the University of Pittsburgh on April 3, 2008.

He campaigned through Pennsylvania in anticipation of the April 22 primary, including two stops in his birthplace of Pittsburgh, at Indiana University of Pennsylvania and at the University of Pittsburgh. He also made several campaign stops in Montana. He was the keynote speaker at the April 26 Nevada Republican State Convention, where his supporters comprised over 2/3 of the 1200-some attendees. Paul's supporters used their super-majority to allow any state delegate to be considered for the position of national delegate, rather than voting on a pre-approved small slate of possible national delegates. Paul was expected to capture most or all of Nevada's 31 delegates to the RNC as a result. The main purpose, according to Paul supporters, was not to make him the nominee but to influence the official RNC party platform so it adopts several of the issues advocated by the Texas congressman.

In Missouri, some 145 "suspected" Paul supporters were barred from participating in the state selection process or from being delegates to the national convention by local GOP party leaders. That led to accusations of procedural violations on the part of state GOP leaders by Republican voters.

The Independent Greens of Virginia (IGVA) petitioned to have Paul as their vice-presidential nominee, putting him on a ticket with New York City Mayor Michael Bloomberg. Paul himself had nothing to do with the nomination, and was only a placeholder candidate who was later replaced as the vice-presidential candidate on the IGVA ticket by Darrell Castle, running mate of Chuck Baldwin.

On June 26, Kent Snyder, Paul's campaign chair, died of viral pneumonia, leaving $400,000 in unpaid medical bills. Other staffers on Paul's campaign started a collection service to help pay for Snyder's remaining medical bills, as the campaign did not provide its workers with health insurance.

In Nevada on June 28, Paul delegates reconvened the state convention to elect national delegates to the RNC. They cited a rule that when the chair of the previous meeting called recess without a vote by the delegates, it broke the rules, meaning that the previous state convention never concluded. From this new convention, he was awarded all of Nevada's national delegates, winning him the state. The Nevada Republican Party challenged the results and elected their own national delegates. Nevada party officials later decided to not have a convention and have the issue decided by the party's executive board via conference call. The RNC rejected the delegates chosen by both groups, eventually granting Paul four of the state's delegates and the rest to McCain.

On June 12, 2008, Paul announced that he was suspending the presidential campaign, investing the more than $4.7 million of remaining campaign contributions to build up the new advocacy group Campaign for Liberty.

== Polling ==
In polling conducted at the Utah GOP convention on June 9, 2007, Paul placed second behind Mitt Romney. Paul also placed second in the straw poll conducted at the National Taxpayers Union conference, following Fred Thompson. Paul placed second, polling 17 percent, in a Cobb County GOP straw poll on July 4, 2007.

He placed third in the Illinois Straw Poll on August 16, 2007, with 18.87 percent of the vote, polling just 0.4 percent behind undeclared candidate Fred Thompson. Paul won the similar West Alabama Republican Assembly 2007 Presidential Preference Straw Poll on August 18, 2007, capturing 216 of 266 votes (81 percent), ahead of second-place Mitt Romney. On August 18. Paul won the South Sound Ronald Reagan Republican Club's straw poll on August 21 in Snohomish County, Washington, with 30 percent of the vote, with Fred Thompson coming in second with 27 percent.

On November 20, 2007, Paul finished fourth behind fellow Republicans Rudy Giuliani, Mitt Romney, and Fred Thompson in a Zogby International "blind bio" poll of likely Republican voters. However, Paul was first when Democrats and Independents were included in the survey. The poll presented potential voters with descriptions of each candidate's resume rather than candidate names.

National polls conducted in January 2008 showed Paul with an average of just under 5% among Republican candidates.

== Primary/caucus results ==
=== Early states – January ===
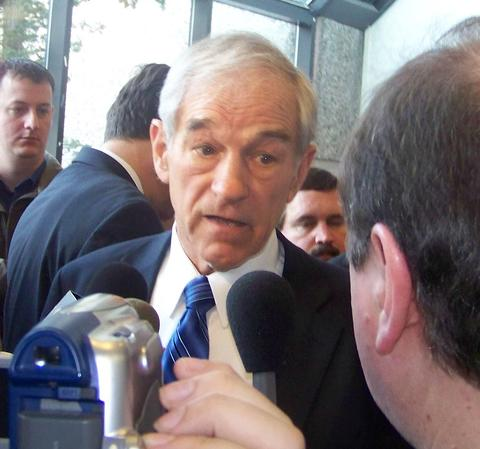
Paul being interviewed the day of the New Hampshire primary in Manchester, January 2008

Paul finished fifth in the 2008 Iowa Republican caucuses with nearly 10 percent of the votes and 2 delegates according to CNN. At the January 5, 2008, Wyoming Republican County Conventions, he placed fourth, receiving no delegates. The Wyoming primary was largely ignored by candidates in favor of the higher-profile race in New Hampshire, but four candidates did campaign there, including Paul. The majority of the 1224 eligible voters at the conventions were elected in 2006.

Paul received 8 percent of the vote in the January 8 New Hampshire primary, finishing fifth in the Republican field and receiving no delegates. Though he had hoped to improve on his Iowa performance, he vowed to stay in the race, telling supporters, "It's really only the beginning." A recount, which Paul does not support, began January 16, 2008. Paul placed fourth in the January 15, 2008, Michigan Republican primary, with 6 percent of the votes and no delegates.

Paul finished second in the January 19 Nevada Republican caucuses with 14 percent of the vote, finishing behind Mitt Romney and earning an estimated four delegates to the national convention. Paul finished fifth in the January 19 South Carolina Republican primary, with 4 percent of the vote and no delegates.

The Louisiana Republican caucuses were held on January 22, 2008. Official results have not yet been reported; preliminary results showed him in second place among candidates. On January 26, the Paul campaign filed a complaint with the state GOP contesting Louisiana's process of choosing delegates.

The Florida primary was held on January 29, 2008, and was a statewide winner-take-all contest for all 57 of Florida's delegates. The Philadelphia Inquirer noted that Paul did not campaign in the state, and he finished in fifth place with 3% of the vote. Los Angeles Times listed Florida as part of an eight-state radio ad campaign by Paul during January 2008.

Ahead the 3-day Maine caucus before Super Tuesday, Paul was the only Republican candidate to visit the state. Paul held campaign events, including a rally at the Maine State House on January 28, 2008. The week before the caucus, Paul said that he was hoping for a "grand showing" in the state. With 74.7% of the precincts counted, Paul placed third in the voter preference tally with 19%. National delegates are assigned to candidates May 2 when state delegates hold their convention. Paul earned 35% of the state delegates to take second place.

=== "Super Tuesday", February 5, 2008 ===
In West Virginia, he spoke at the GOP convention alongside Mitt Romney and Mike Huckabee. Paul came in a distant fourth (10%) in the first vote by the state GOP convention and was eliminated for the second round, with McCain eliminated next. Paul's and McCain's supporters voted for Mike Huckabee. Paul's campaign stated that they had a deal with Huckabee to get 3 delegates in exchange for the support they gave to him. The Huckabee campaign has not confirmed that.

Paul's best showings were in Montana, with 25% for second place and no delegates, third in the North Dakota caucus with 21% and five delegates, third in Alaska with 17% and five delegates, and third in Utah with 3%. In that day's 16 other primaries and caucuses (Alabama, Arizona, Arkansas, California, Colorado, Connecticut, Delaware, Georgia, Illinois, Massachusetts, Minnesota, Missouri, New Jersey, New York, Oklahoma, Tennessee), Paul finished fourth among current candidates. (He placed fifth in California overall, as Giuliani received absentee ballots.)

Paul received 4% of the popular vote among all Super Tuesday states.

=== Later February and March 2008 ===
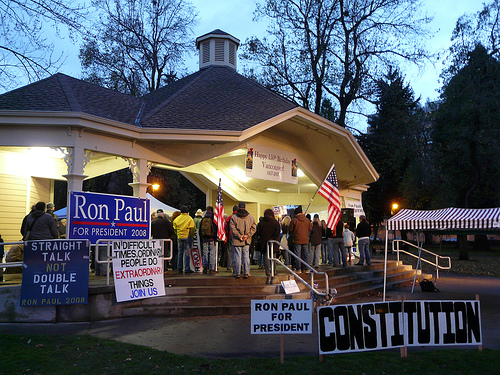
New Year's debate rally for Ron Paul in Vancouver, Washington

On February 9, Kansas, Louisiana, and Washington held their contests. In the Kansas caucuses, Paul finished third, with 11% and no delegates. In the Louisiana primary, Paul finished third among current candidates (fourth overall, as Romney was still on the ballot) with 5%, though no delegates were at stake. In the Washington state caucuses, Paul placed third, with 22%, behind Huckabee (24%) and McCain (26%). Nearly half of Washington's delegates are picked at this caucus and the rest in the primary February 19, 2008.

On the February 12 Potomac Primaries, Maryland, Virginia, and Washington, DC, held their contests. Paul came in third among current candidates in each of them, receiving 6% in Maryland, 4% in Virginia, and 8% in the District of Columbia. A Fox News exit poll showed that in Virginia, 20% of independent voters voting in the Republican races voted for Paul.

In the two February 19 primaries, Paul came in third in Wisconsin with 5% and fourth in Washington state's follow-up primary (8%), even though he was third in the state's caucus with 22%. Paul placed third in the caucus of Puerto Rico (4.33%), tied with Mike Huckabee for second place in the Northern Mariana Islands caucus (4.35%), and has an unknown standing in the American Samoa caucus.

In the four Republican primaries on March 4, Paul came in third in every state. He earned 5% in Texas and Ohio and 7% in Vermont and Rhode Island.

Mississippi held their Republican primary on March 11, 2008. Paul finished 3rd with 4% of the vote.

=== Second quarter 2008 ===
In three early April Minnesota state delegate conventions, Paul picked up 6 national delegates from the 12 at stake; they are allowed to vote for any candidate regardless of caucus results. The Nevada GOP convention had to be suspended when GOP leaders realized that Paul supporters were going to win delegates in the proceedings. Further conventions will occur in May.

In the April 22 Pennsylvania Primary, he finished second with 16% of the vote overall. Paul and Mike Huckabee, who was also on the ballot, did best in Pennsylvania's conservative regions. In the May 6 primaries in Indiana and North Carolina, Paul earned 8% of the vote in both states. In the May 13 West Virginia primary, Paul received 5% of the vote. In the May 20 primaries, Paul received 15% of the vote plus 4 national delegates in Oregon and 7% in Kentucky.

Paul won 24 percent of the vote in the May 27 Idaho Republican primary, which was his best showing in a primary state.

== Delegate count ==
2008 Republican presidential primaries delegate count As of June 10, 2008
Candidates	Actual pledged delegates^{1} (1,780 of 1,917)	Estimated total delegates^{2} (2,159 of 2,380; 1,191 needed to win)
John McCain	1,378	1,575
Mike Huckabee	240	278
Mitt Romney	148	271
Ron Paul	14	35
Color key: / 1st place / Candidate has withdrawn
Sources:^{1} "Primary Season Election Results". The New York Times. September 16, 2008. Archived from the original on September 16, 2008.^{2} "Election Center 2008 – Republican Delegate Scorecard". CNN. June 4, 2008.

== Fundraising ==
State wise fund raising compared to all other candidates put together.

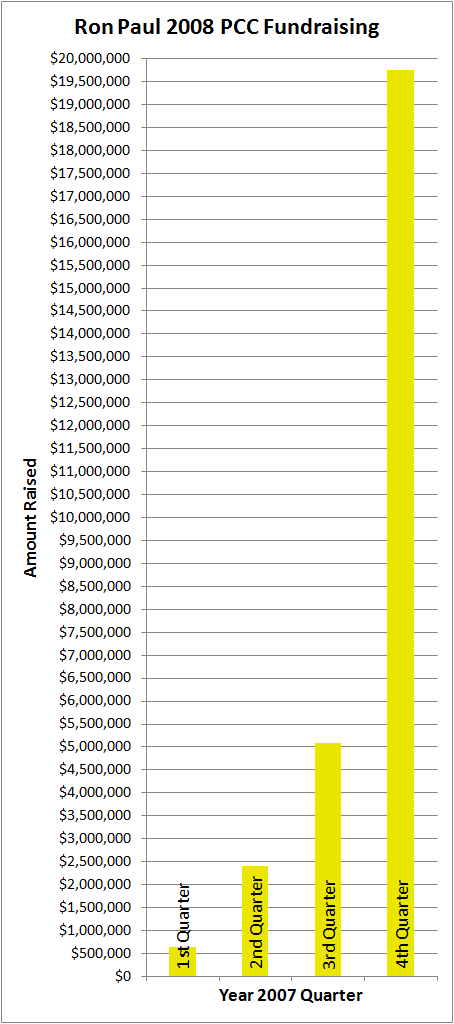
Ron Paul's 2007 fund-raising efforts by quarter.

Paul's fundraising increased significantly over the campaign, led by campaign staff including 24-year-old fundraising director Jonathan Bydlak and now-deceased Kent Snyder. The campaign holds an all-time record for political one-day fund-raising. The Paul campaign disclosed donations immediately, instead of on a quarterly basis.

Among active campaigns in February 2008, his had the smallest payroll as a portion of funds raised – only 8 percent of campaign funds, or $1.5 million.

=== Sources ===
100% of Paul's campaign money came from individual contributors, with 47 percent of the funds raised from small contributions of $200 or less.

As of February 14, 2008, U.S. Army, U.S. Navy, and U.S. Air force members represent three top contributors to Ron Paul's campaign, respectively.

=== First quarter 2007 ===
Paul raised more money in New Hampshire in the first quarter of 2007 than presumed Republican front-runners John McCain and Rudy Giuliani. As of March 31, 2007, Paul had raised $63,989 for his campaign nationwide. Of that, he had spent US$15,070, giving him $47,919 cash-on-hand.

=== Second quarter 2007 ===
As of the end of the second quarter 2007, Paul had over US$2.4 million in the bank, which was more than John McCain, who had $2 million. He outraised every second-tier candidate, and was fourth in fund-raising among the Republicans, behind the three frontrunners.

=== Third quarter 2007 ===
Paul's campaign raised $5.08 million in the third quarter, increasing 114% over the previous quarter. After he began realtime publication of fundraising totals in September 2007, an end-of-quarter fundraiser raised an unexpected $1.2 million in one week; the projected amount had been $500,000. The campaign outperformed "front-runner" candidates; Paul fundraising, measured in itemized donations (over US$200), exceeded that of Giuliani, Romney, and Thompson in many states. ABC News also reported that Paul received more donations from serving members of the armed services than any other GOP candidate. At the close of the quarter, the campaign reported US$5.4 million on hand, more than John McCain, having spent only 34 percent of the proceeds of the preceding three quarters.

=== Fourth quarter 2007 ===
Fundraising efforts by state.

As of December 31, Paul raised $19,765,974 in the fourth quarter, bringing him to roughly $28 million total. His fourth quarter donations came from 130,000 donors, including over 100,000 new contributors. He raised more money than any other Republican candidate in the fourth quarter. The second highest total raised was by Rudy Giuliani, who got $14.4 million before dropping out of the race. Mitt Romney raised $9 million in the fourth quarter from contributors, but lent himself $18 million of his own money, giving him the largest total. According to the campaign, Paul's donations average $100 per donor Compared to Democratic candidates, Paul's fourth quarter total was close to Hillary Clinton's, who raised approximately $20 million.

He received more money from donors in the military, over $200,000, than any other candidate, Democrat or Republican.

=== First quarter 2008 ===
In the month of March 2008, Paul raised a little over $120,000, though his campaign financial records show him to have $5.1 million cash on hand. Paul's fund raising in 2008 was overall far less than in the previous quarter.

=== Second quarter 2008 ===
With roughly $4 million cash on hand left, "[Ron Paul's campaign] is exploring the option of using the remaining campaign funds to establish a for-profit publishing company aimed at producing educational materials." The money would eventually be put towards founding Campaign for Liberty.

== Internet popularity ==
Paul participated in several 2008 GOP debates, the majority of which he won according to the sponsors' own online or text-message phone polls. After the first debate, ABC News noted that Paul has a "robust online presence." TIME magazine labels Paul "the new 2.0 candidate" in reference to "his success recruiting supporters through new social media channels". The New York Times wrote that his campaign "snowballed on the Internet". According to KDPaine and Partners, Paul's YouTube videos made up half of the top ten of all candidate videos, and he had the largest overall viewership of any candidate. Jack Cafferty stated that Paul's followers "at any given moment can almost overpower the Internet."

Forbes.com noted a disparity between Paul's online support and his performance in the primaries: while Paul supporters responded in droves to text-message and online polls following televised debates, he received 10% of the vote in Iowa and 8% in New Hampshire. David Thorburn, director of the MIT Communications Forum, said that while the Internet is a major source of fundraising, it is not yet able to compete with traditional media for influence in campaigns. Thorburn added that support from "an intellectually elite minority that lives in cyberspace does not translate into support among the general population."

Blogger Tommy Christopher noted that critics of Paul's followers accused them of being "cult-like" in an attempt to marginalize Paul's support base. Christopher opined that this was part of a "seemingly willful determination by the mainstream media to completely ignore or glibly dismiss Paul's many successes."

=== Rankings ===
Alexa.com data shows Paul's campaign website for his suspended campaign receiving less traffic than the sites of Hillary Clinton and Barack Obama, as well as roughly equal traffic to John McCain. However, Paul's traffic far exceeded Clinton's, and even Obama's as far back as January, evidence of his intense web-based following. Paul's site receives more traffic than Rudy Giuliani, Mitt Romney or Fred Thompson. Hitwise ranks Ron Paul as the seventh most frequent candidate search. In June 2007, Kate Kaye of ClickZNews used Hitwise data to report that Paul had "rocketed from fifth place to first" in their Republican Candidates' Site Traffic Market Share and Rankings report. By October 2007 Fred Thompson had pushed Paul out of the first-place position. After March 2008 Paul's site traffic as measured by Hitwise trailed that of McCain, Clinton, and Obama. The SIPP index, a site that claims to track how candidates connect with voters, had him ranked #3 out of all of the candidates in the 2008 primary when he dropped his bid.

=== Social networking ===
In addition to his search popularity, Paul has become popular on a variety of social networking websites. On January 30, 2008, Paul had over 131,000 "friends" on MySpace, and was the Republican winner of the MySpace Presidential Primary in January 2008, with 37% of the votes. He also has a presence on Facebook, with over 58,000 people in a campaign-related group as of July 22, 2008. As of January 30, 2008, he received 10 percent of the votes in Facebook's Elections 2008 presidential poll, placing him first among Republicans and second among all candidates, behind Barack Obama (at 25%), but ahead of Hillary Clinton at 9%.

Paul's YouTube channel is among the Top 40 most subscribed of all time, achieving 30,000 subscribers in December 2007. The Weekly Standard on December 10, 2007, reported: "To give an idea of Paul's viral velocity, if you hit "Rudy Giuliani" or "Mitt Romney" into YouTube's search engine, you'll turn up about 3,700 hits apiece. Do the same with "Ron Paul," and you'll be wading through 63,000 offerings." The "Ron Paul Girl" is an internet video not originally generated from the campaign, but which received hundreds of thousands of viewings and is thought to have contributed materially to internet fund-raising. Also, a number of World of Warcraft players have named themselves after Paul and staged an in-game support march.

On January 30, 2008, he had the largest distributed grassroots organization on Meetup.com of all candidates, with almost 105,000 members in 1,600 Meetup groups, that collectively planned and held nearly 31,000 offline events to rally support (and raise money) for their candidate. In comparison, Barack Obama – who had the second largest Meetup organization among active candidates – had close to 5,000 members among 82 Meetup groups.

Summed up by James Rainey of the Los Angeles Times, "Paulites tend to be tech-savvy, tired of traditional politics and suspicious of their government and the mainstream media. But after that, they defy categories...[consisting of] Democrats, Republicans, Libertarians, and Constitution Party followers uniting behind some or all of the Paul libertarian agenda – ending the war in Iraq, abolishing gun control laws, legalizing marijuana and dismantling big hunks of the U.S. government, especially the IRS and Federal Reserve system."

Jack Cafferty observed that Paul's grassroots network is one "politicians dream about" and that no other candidate running had a base as dedicated or as vocal as Paul's. Paul also earned the attention of sympathizers outside of the United States.

=== Spamming ===
In November 2007, the University of Alabama at Birmingham's Spam Data Mining for Law Enforcement Applications project examined a large amount of spam supporting Paul's candidacy. Gary Warner, UAB's director of computer forensics, called the spamming "a criminal act in support of a campaign," but stated that he does not believe the campaign itself is in any way responsible. Paul's spokesman, Jesse Benton, said in an email to Wired magazine calling the spamming the work of "a well-intentioned yet misguided supporter or someone with bad intentions trying to embarrass the campaign." The spamming resulted in the removal of at least one Paul video from YouTube, according to anti-phishing researcher Chris Barton of McAfee.

The Wired article claimed that the finding is "significant" because of Paul's popularity in online polls, which Wired says does not reflect offline polling, and suggests technically sophisticated Paul supporters may have been "manipulating" polls.

Earlier, the prominent conservative blog RedState barred users with accounts less than six months old from posting messages supporting Paul. This was due to a torrent of pro-Paul comment spam. Other blogs at least temporarily shut down their online polls due to concerns the results may have been stacked by Paul supporters.

== Grassroots campaign efforts ==
=== Ron Paul Revolution ===
Ron Paul Revolution design

Paul's candidacy drew a significant degree of support from grassroots movements, and supporters worked independently of the official campaign or the GOP to raise Paul's public profile and bring in record breaking campaign donations. A number of supporters have described these efforts as the "Ron Paul Revolution," an allusion to the American Revolution that frequently appears on placards and T-shirts at rallies and serves as a slogan that the official campaign has adopted. Supporters use the letters "EVOL" ("love" reversed) to represent peace and hope.

=== Money bombs ===
In early October 2007, a website was set up to raise $1 million per week independently for Paul's campaign by having individuals pledge en masse the same amount (per donor) on the same day each week. News media began referring to this effort as a "money bomb". By mid-October, several other "money bomb" fund raising dates, all unaffiliated with the actual Paul campaign, had caused fund raising spikes of hundreds of thousands of dollars each. On average, over 1,500 people donated per hour.

In late October, a grassroots website called "This November 5" was launched, requesting pledges for the Paul campaign on November 5, the same day as Guy Fawkes Day. They collected over 18,000 e-mail addresses.

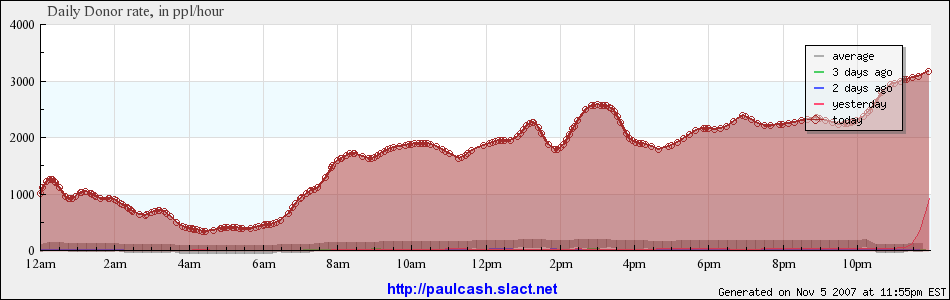
Donation rates for November 5

On November 5, 2007, the campaign raised over $4.3 million. That amount is the largest amount collected on a single day by any Republican candidate, and the record for largest amount of on-line fund raising in a single day ever in U.S. history. Paul eclipsed his overall third-quarter fund-raising total around 2:30 p.m. EST.

Paul's December campaign contributions rose to over $7.1 million and the Q4 campaign contributions rose to over $17 million as a result of this push. The campaign website displayed a novel real-time display of the funds raised and the names of donors. Smaller fund raising money bombs continued throughout November and early December.

December 16 donation rates

A December 16, 2007, money bomb on the anniversary of the Boston Tea Party broke the campaign's previous record, raising nearly $2 million more than the November 5 event, bringing in over US$6 million in the largest single day of fund raising, on-line or not, in U.S. presidential campaign history. During the last minutes of the drive, the server refused to accept contributions due to an overload of donations, as about 100 contributors per minute donated to the campaign; more than an additional $100,000 were donated within the hour past midnight.

February 1, 2008, marked the 51st anniversary of his marriage to Carol Paul. Supporters raised over $1 million in the 24-hour period for the campaign as an "anniversary gift", making it the fourth largest campaign donation day to date.

=== Ron Paul Blimp ===
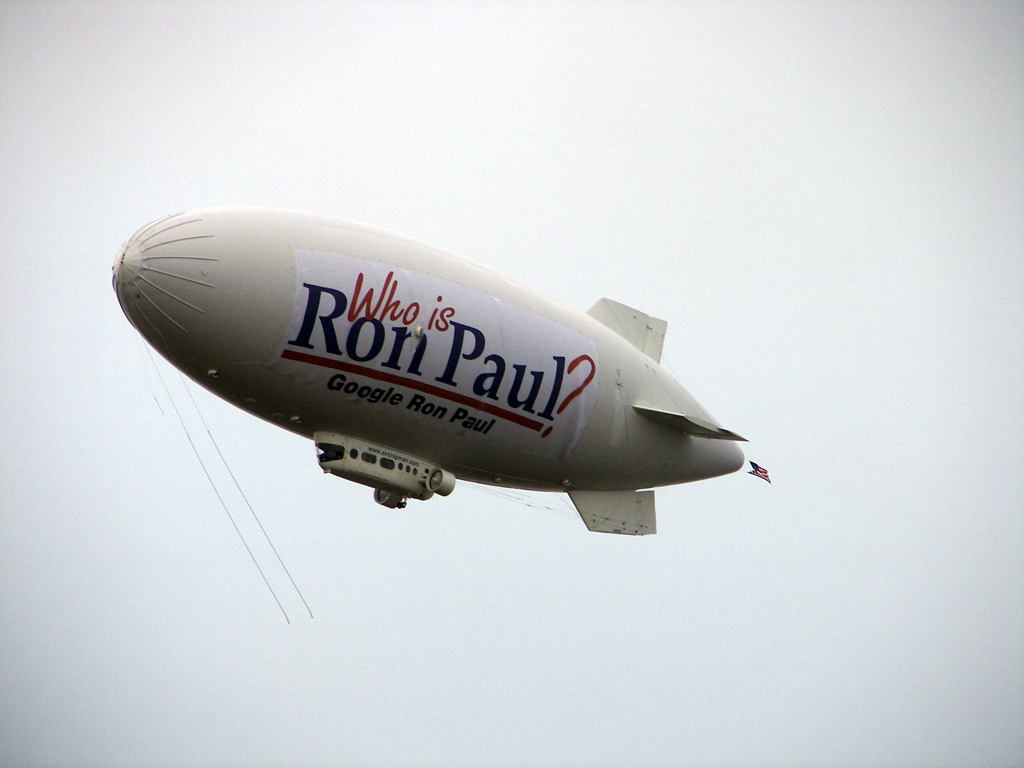
The Ron Paul blimp on its launch day.

The Ron Paul Blimp was an aerial billboard launched in December 2007 with considerable publicity. It was emblazoned on one side with "Who is Ron Paul? Google Ron Paul" and, on the other, "Ron Paul Revolution." At 200 feet (61 m) long, the blimp was longer than the Goodyear Blimp. With a stated cost of $400,000 per month, supporters raised enough money to keep the blimp afloat for about six weeks. Piloted by Dick Schwenker, it flew over Walt Disney World for several days, as well as the January 10 presidential debate in Myrtle Beach, South Carolina.

The blimp was financed by a for-profit company (Liberty Political Advertising, L.L.C.), rather than the campaign itself. This structure was created to permit donors to escape federal limits of $2,300 per person on campaign donations. The FEC has not commented on the validity of such a finance structure.

A supporter named Elizabeth Blane also created a 20-foot (6.1 m) "micro-blimp" emblazoned with the same logos as the full sized blimp, which flew over the San Diego area.

=== Other efforts ===
An avid Paul supporter and businessman, Joby Weeks, refurbished an old stretch limousine into the Ron Paul Limo, which is 55 feet (17 m) long. The limousine toured high-traffic cities across the country, and was personally signed by Paul on one side.

A Nevada brothel owner promised to take up a collection from his customers to back Paul's bid.

Paul supporters created a number of songs in support of him. Steve Dore, for example, produced a CD called "Early Songs of the Great Ron Paul Revolution," the profits from which were donated to Paul's campaign.

Artists in Texas and other states created homemade signs in support of Paul's candidacy.

Dean Van Gundy in Grand Junction, Colorado paid for a bus full of "campaigners" to sit in a prominent location, hoping to pick up more supporters.

Some Paul supporters announced plans to build a cooperative community populated solely by those philosophically aligned with Paul dubbed "Paulville" on a plot near Dell City, Texas, in a sparsely populated area between San Angelo and El Paso. Paul himself was not in favor of the idea, stating "I don't see that as a solution, but it can't hurt anything either".

Supporters of Paul held a rally in the Minneapolis-St. Paul area, at the same time the 2008 Republican National Convention took place in that city, and officially commenced the Campaign for Liberty.

== Republican presidential debates ==
=== Second quarter 2007 ===
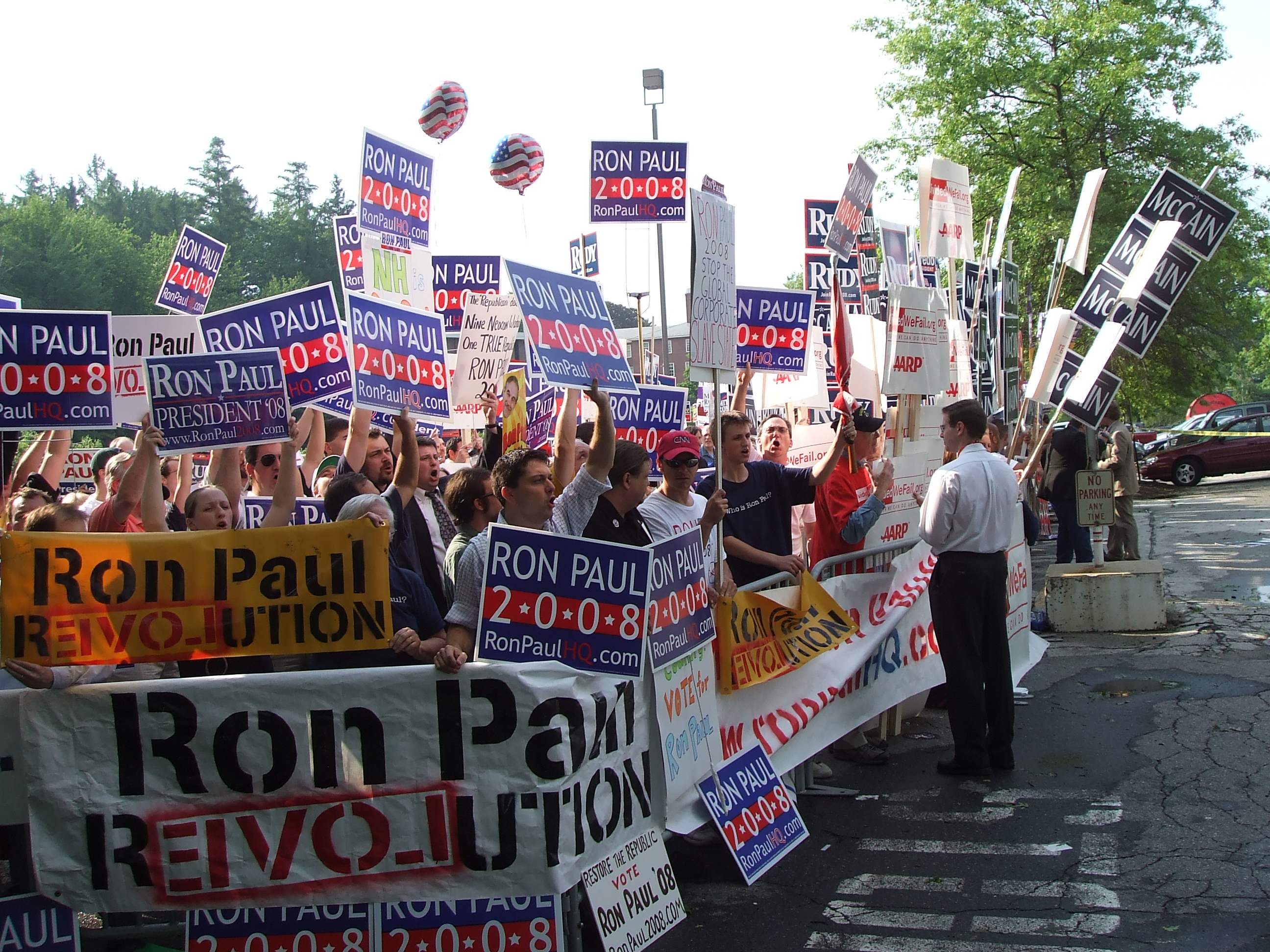
Ron Paul supporters at a pre-debate rally in Manchester, New Hampshire on June 5, 2007.

On May 3, 2007, Paul participated in a 90-minute presidential debate at the Reagan Presidential Library, alongside nine other Republican candidates. In online voting hosted by MSNBC and Politico, Paul was ranked first for "Best one liner," "Who stood out from the pack", "Most convincing debater", and "Who showed the most leadership qualities?" and was winning the "rating and comparing candidates" question.

Paul participated in the Fox News Channel First-in-the-South Republican Party Presidential Candidates Debate at the University of South Carolina on May 15, alongside nine other Republican candidates. In a phone text message based vote among viewers after the debate, Paul finished second, winning 25% of the votes.

During the debate, Congressman Paul commented that America's history of interventionism in the Middle East has led to an unpopular view of the U.S. in Middle Eastern countries, and argued that the CIA's removal of Iranian leader Mohammed Mosaddeq in Operation Ajax, the Iraq War and the bombing of Iraq in the 1990s had led to increasing anti-American sentiment in the Middle East and promoted terrorism. When the moderator asked if Paul was suggesting that the US had "invited" the 9/11 attacks, Paul argued with fellow candidate Rudy Giuliani, who responded to Paul's suggestion that the U.S. pay attention to the underlying causes of terrorism by saying "I don't think I've heard that before, and I've heard some pretty absurd explanations for September 11. And I would ask the congressman to withdraw that comment and tell us that he didn't really mean that." Paul responded that terrorists were the result of "blowback" from poor foreign policy, and that they "don't come here to attack us because we're rich and we're free, they come and attack us because we're over there."

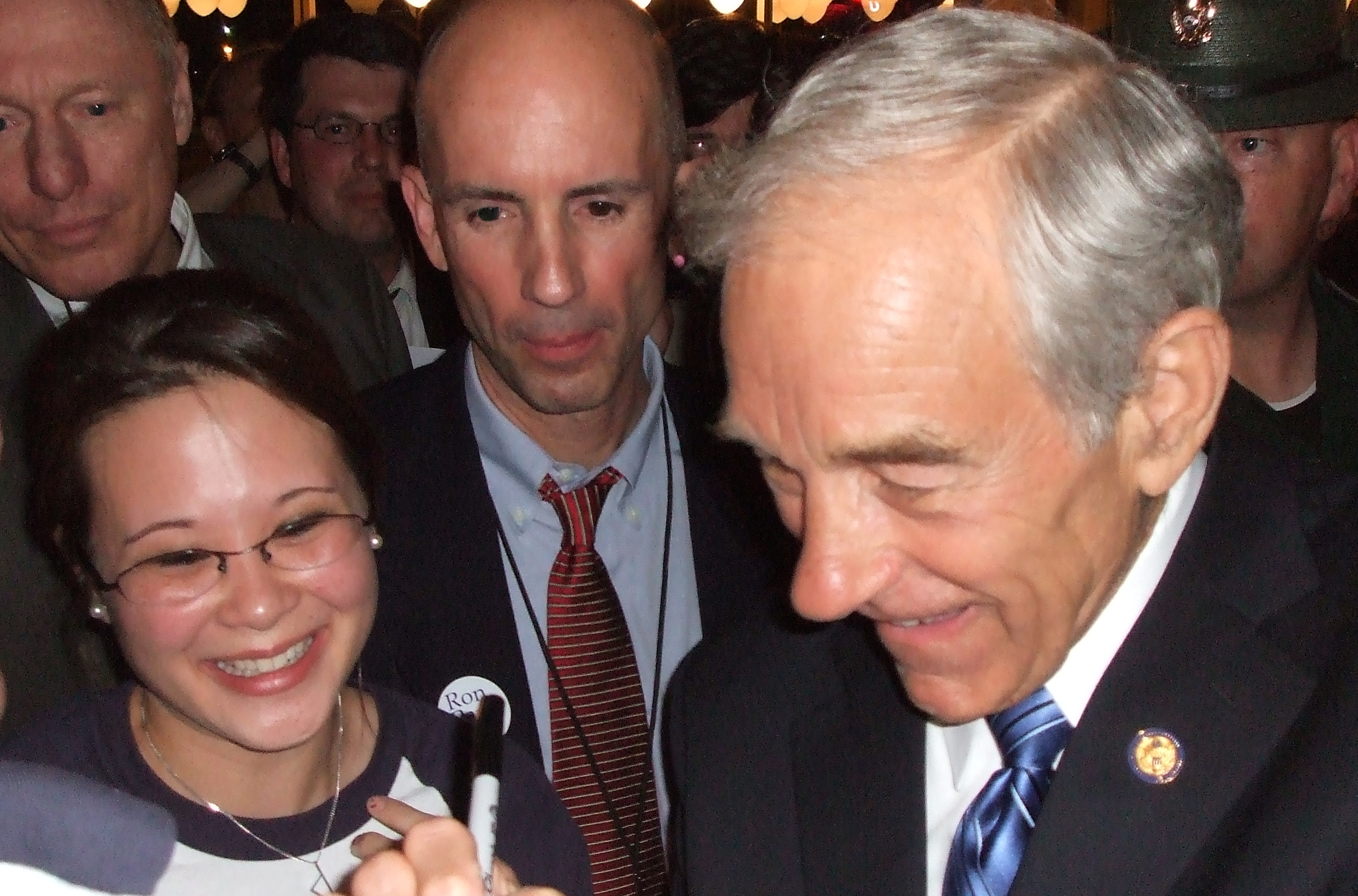
Ron Paul signs autographs as campaign manager Kent Snyder (center) looks on at a rally after CNN's June 5, 2007, GOP debate.

Though the confrontation was noted in the media and cast as a political win for Giuliani, Paul's remarks were debated. Conservative pundits including Sean Hannity and Michael Steele criticized them; former CIA Bin Laden Issue Station head Michael Scheuer endorsed them as "obvious" and an "immense service to all Americans"; and commentator Andrew Sullivan agreed with Paul, citing his comments as evidence that he was the only GOP candidate "serious about national security." Paul condemned Giuliani's attack in a press release, later demanding an apology on CNN's The Situation Room with Wolf Blitzer.

In the debate, Paul and McCain refused to endorse torture, with Paul labelling the phrase "enhanced interrogation techniques" as "Orwellian".

He participated in the CNN Republican debate in New Hampshire on June 5. Paul argued against a preemptive military policy in favor of going "back to traditions and our Constitution" and "[defending] our liberties and [defending] our rights.". He was given fewer than six minutes of time, less than Mitt Romney, John McCain, or Rudy Giuliani.

=== Third quarter 2007 ===
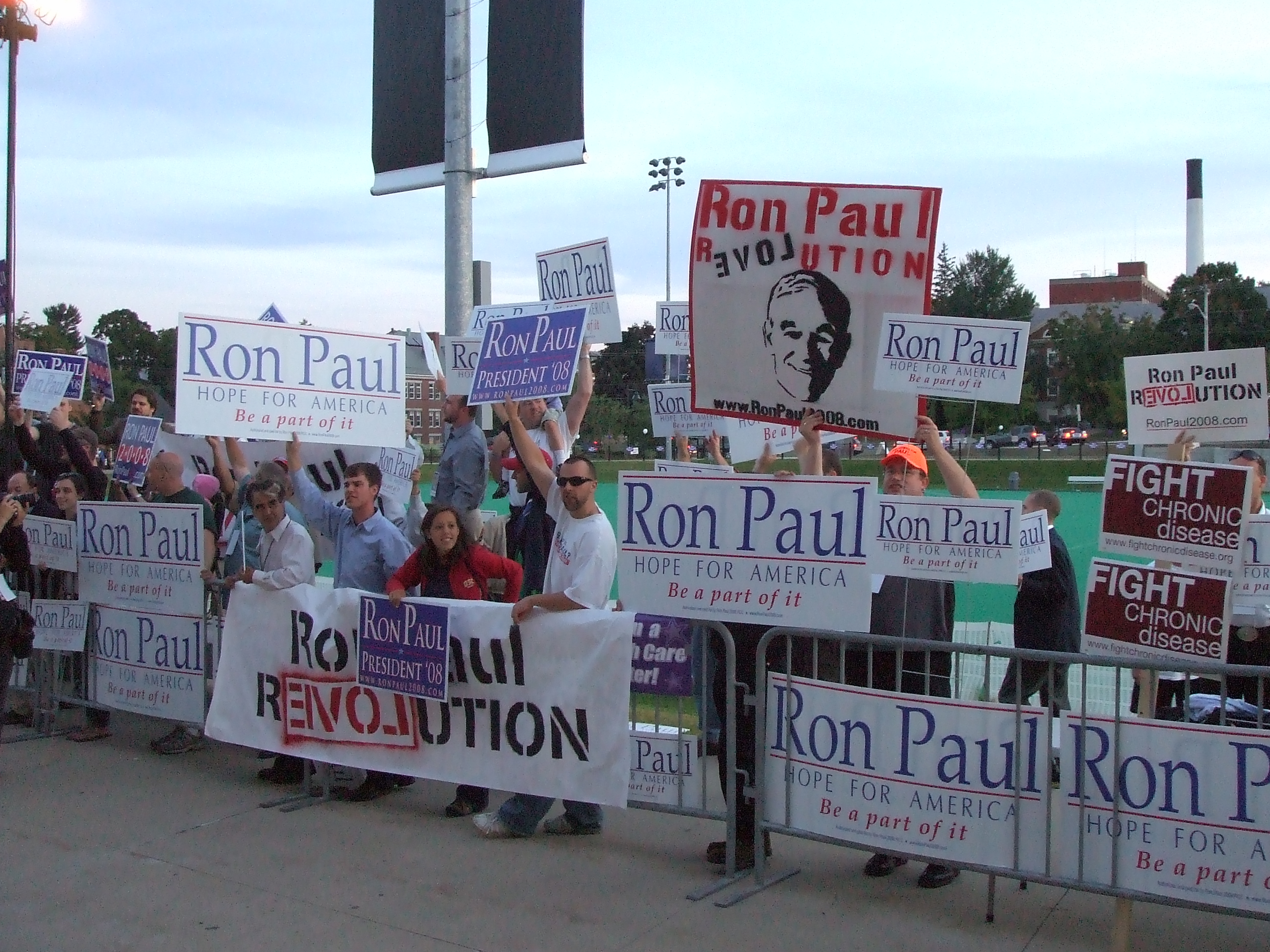
Supporters outside of the Fox News debate on September 5, 2007.

Paul participated in ABC News's Republican presidential debate at Drake University in Des Moines, Iowa on August 5. Time Magazine's Mark Halperin evaluated Paul's performance "crowd-pleasing," and added, "if the Republicans nominated a candidate based on who most moved the applause meter, Paul would be giving his acceptance speech next summer." Paul was the favorite of an on-line poll at ABCNews.com, winning 63 percent of votes.

Paul participated in the Fox News debate at the University of New Hampshire on September 5. Paul and Mike Huckabee argued over the war in Iraq, with Paul attributing Republican losses in the 2006 elections to the unpopular war. Paul won a Fox-sponsored text-messaging poll with 33 percent of votes.

On September 17, Paul participated in the GOP "Values Voters' Presidential Debate" in Fort Lauderdale, Florida, alongside six other candidates --- John H. Cox, Sam Brownback, Mike Huckabee, Duncan Hunter, Alan Keyes, and Tom Tancredo. Paul finished second in an official post-debate delegate straw poll, trailing Mike Huckabee's 63% showing with 13% of the vote.

Paul participated in a September 27 debate hosted by PBS television at Morgan State University with a panel exclusively of journalists of color. The organizers put empty podiums on the stage in the names of the absent candidates. Alongside himself, Sam Brownback, Mike Huckabee, Alan Keyes, Duncan Hunter, and Tom Tancredo answered questions.

=== Fourth quarter 2007 ===
Paul participated in an October 9 debate sponsored by CNBC, The Wall Street Journal, and the University of Michigan–Dearborn. The debate aired on MSNBC at 9 pm ET. Paul fielded several questions relating to economic issues, warning that "as long as we live beyond our means, we are destined to live beneath our means". As in previous debates, he also addressed monetary theory.

The Republican Jewish Coalition candidates' forum on October 16, 2007, did not invite Paul due to "time only for leading candidates" and his "record of consistently voting against assistance to Israel and his criticisms of the pro-Israel lobby", according to sources close to the RJC.

Paul appeared in a 90-minute October 21 debate in Orlando, Florida sponsored by Fox News, winning an informal "cell phone" vote, but drawing jeers during the debate for advocating non-interventionist foreign policy.

Paul participated in the November 28 Republican CNN-YouTube Presidential Debate in St. Petersburg, Florida alongside seven other candidates. He obtained less than 8 minutes of time, and was not addressed with a question until the second half-hour. Paul debated John McCain on the merits of isolationism versus non-intervention. Paul won a CNN online "scorecard" with 51% of the vote; two of three CNN analysts stated that he had a "disappointing" performance, but the other argued that Paul "came off very direct and clear" and "stood out the most".

Paul participated in the December 9 GOP debate hosted by Spanish-speaking television network Univision at the University of Miami, alongside seven other candidates.

Sponsored by The Des Moines Register newspaper and Iowa Public Television, the December 12 debate among nine Republican candidates was broadcast live on the statewide television network and re-broadcast later. It was available to all PBS stations, and was the last debate before the Iowa caucuses, January 3, 2008.

=== First quarter 2008 ===
Paul participated in the ABC/WMUR-TV/Facebook Republican debate at Saint Anselm College in New Hampshire on January 5, 2008. Charles Gibson moderated.

Fox News excluded Paul, Duncan Hunter, and Alan Keyes from a January 6 New Hampshire forum, sparking protests from Paul supporters. Fox said that due to having limited space in the "souped-up bus" in which the debate was to take place, they required that the candidates must have been polling at least ten percent in recent nationwide polls to be included in the debate. In a nationwide poll conducted by the Associated Press and Yahoo, December 14–20, Paul was only polling at three percent which was far short of the threshold necessary for debate inclusion. The Paul campaign said they were not given a reason for the exclusion, and the New Hampshire Republican Party withdrew their sponsorship. Instead of attending, Paul held his own town hall event, where voters were allowed to ask him questions. It was broadcast live on local New Hampshire television and streamed online. Jay Leno invited Paul as a Tonight Show guest January 7 specifically because he said he thought Paul's exclusion was "unfair."

Fox News hosted a January 10 debate at the Myrtle Beach Convention Center in South Carolina. Paul participated despite his exclusion from the Fox News debate. Paul declined to be interviewed after the debate by Fox News anchors Sean Hannity and Alan Colmes, citing other commitments.

MSNBC hosted a two-hour debate at Florida Atlantic University on January 24, the last before the Florida Primaries. Paul took part, and a text message poll asking viewers who they believed had won showed Romney in first with 41% and Paul in second at 40%. On January 30, Paul was one of four candidates in a debate hosted by Los Angeles Times, Politico and CNN in Simi Valley, California, at the Ronald Reagan Presidential Library.

On February 2, MTV and MySpace hosted a two-party debate broadcast live from New York City: "Closing Arguments: A Presidential Super Dialogue." Paul and Mike Huckabee were the only Republicans to attend.

== Endorsements ==
Paul had the official endorsement of many in the 2008 nomination race, including academics, actors, politicians, and political organizations and pundits.

List of Ron Paul endorsements

Paul's endorsers include:

Organizations

- Alabama Constitution Party
- Montana Shooting Sports Association
- The Old School Conservatives – independent political organization
- Reform Party of Ohio
- United Republicans of California
- Wyoming State Shooting Association
- Alabama Republican Assembly
- Christians for Life and Liberty

Press

- The American Conservative – paleoconservative magazine
- The Muslim Observer – national newspaper

Elected officials – current

- Walter B. Jones – United States Representative from North Carolina's third district
- Aubyn Curtiss – Montana state Senator.
- Michael J. Doherty – New Jersey state legislator.
- Mike Folmer – Pennsylvania state Senator.
- Jim Guest – Missouri state representative.
- Phil Hart – Idaho state representative.
- Paul Ingbretson – New Hampshire state representative.
- Karen Johnson – Arizona state senator.
- Rick Jore – Montana representative.
- Roger Koopman – Montana representative.
- Allan Mansoor – mayor of Costa Mesa, California.
- Jerry O'Neill – Montana state representative.
- Steve Vaillancourt – New Hampshire state representative.

Government officials – former

- Paul Findley – former member of Congress (R-IL)
- Barry Goldwater Jr. – former member of Congress (R-CA)
- Gary Johnson – former governor of New Mexico
- Karen Kwiatkowski – Air Force Lieutenant Colonel, Retired
- Andrew Napolitano – political commentator and former New Jersey Superior Court Judge

Political – other

- Michael Badnarik – 2004 Libertarian Party presidential candidate
- Chuck Baldwin – 2004 Constitution Party vice-presidential candidate
- Jim Clymer – Constitution Party National Chairman
- Darrell Castle – Constitution Party National Co-chairman
- Frank Gonzalez – 2008 independent congressional candidate in Florida
- Stephen P. Gordon – former national communications director, Libertarian Party
- Larry Kilgore – 2008 Republican candidate for U.S. Senate in Texas
- Steve Kubby – Former Libertarian Party presidential candidate
- Michael Peroutka – 2004 Constitution Party presidential candidate
- Justin Raimondo – 1996 Republican congressional candidate in California and editorial director of Antiwar.com
- Mary Starrett – Constitution Party National Communications Director
- Richard Viguerie – conservative strategist and writer.

Academia – economics

- Walter Block, Ph.D. – professor of economics at Loyola University and fellow at the Mises Institute.
- Walter E. Williams, Ph.D. – professor of economics, George Mason University.

Paul has also received endorsements from active and retired economics professors at The University of Dallas, Orange Coast College, Saddleback College, Hollins University, Pepperdine University, Johns Hopkins University, The Naval Postgraduate School, Winston-Salem State University, Hillsdale College, and Indiana University.

Academia – other

- David Beito, Ph.D. – professor of history, University of Alabama.

Paul has also received endorsements from active and retired professors at Southern Illinois University, Ohio University, Florida Atlantic University, Brigham Young University, and the Oregon Institute of Science and Medicine.

Finance

- Peter Schiff – financial consultant, Fox News contributor and author of Crash Proof.
- Don Luskin – financial consultant, columnist and author.

Media

- Alex Jones – Texas radio host and filmmaker.
- Texe Marrs – pastor, author and radio host.
- Theodore Beale – columnist.
- Tucker Carlson – Former host of Tucker and co-host of Crossfire, MSNBC's head election correspondent
- John Derbyshire – columnist for National Review Online.
- J. R. Gach – talk radio host.
- Eric Garris journalist
- G. Edward Griffin – conspiracy theorist and author.
- Karen Kay – author.
- Devvy Kidd – political columnist.
- Robert Ringer – author.
- Lew Rockwell chairman of the Mises Institute
- Lauren Royal – author.
- Joel Skousen – conservative political scientist and editor of World Affairs Brief
- L. Neil Smith – author.
- Joseph Sobran – columnist.
- Kinky Friedman – author, songwriter, humorist.
- Andrew Sullivan – columnist at The Atlantic and blog publisher of The Daily Dish.

Celebrity endorsements

- Prodigy -rapper
- Drew Carey -comedian
- Arlo Guthrie, – singer/songwriter (and son of Woody Guthrie)
- Krist Novoselic – musician (bass player for Nirvana)
- Todd Wade – Redskins tackle
- Rock band From First to Last and side project The Color of Violence

== Post-campaign activities ==
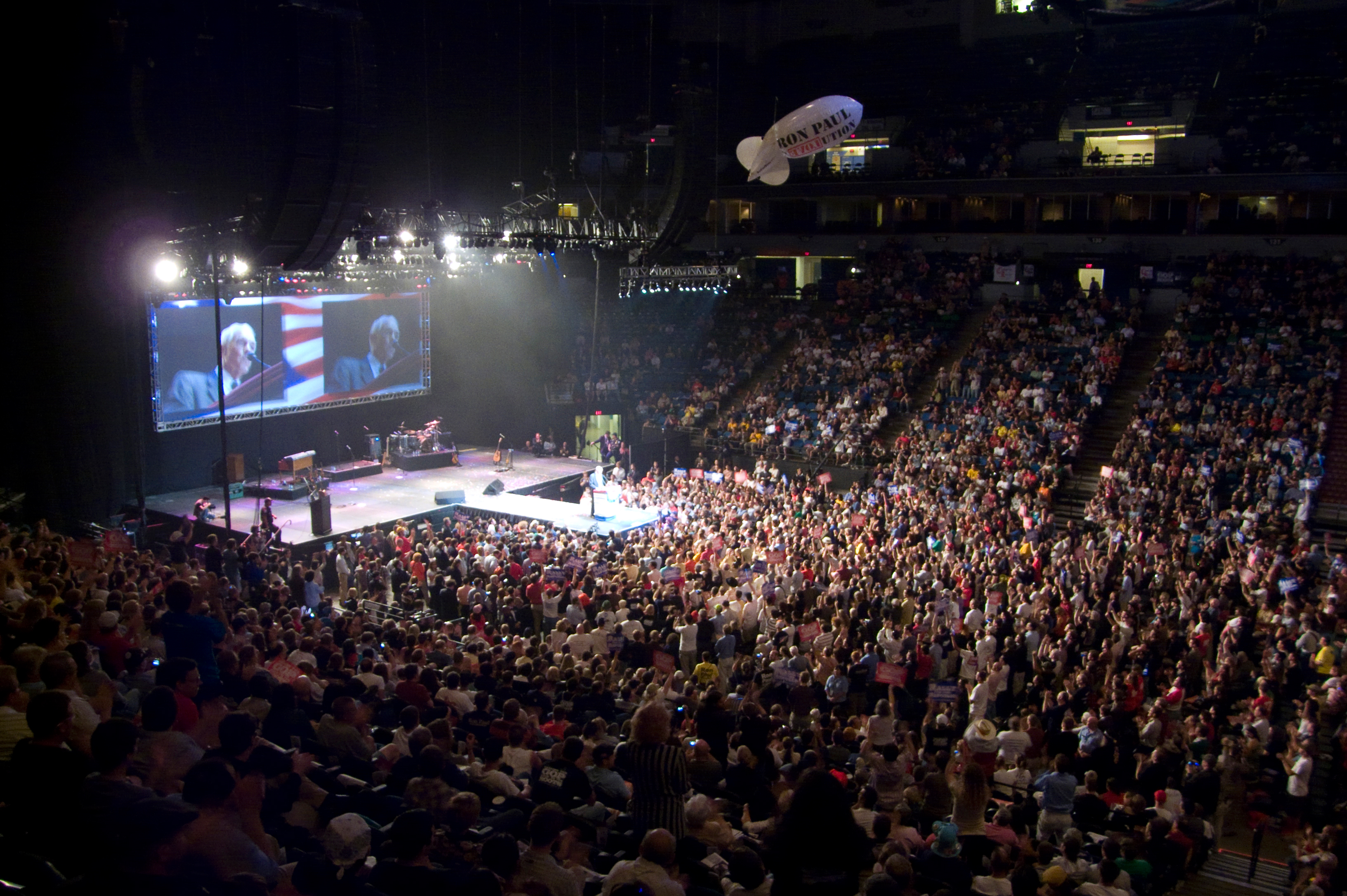
Ron Paul's Rally for the Republic, held on September 2, 2008

Paul was not invited to speak at the 2008 Republican National Convention (held from September 1–4) and was even limited in his access to the convention floor. Instead, he hosted the Rally for the Republic with Ron Paul's Campaign for Liberty and 10,000 supporters. This protest convention on September 2 was held a few miles from the convention center at the Minneapolis Target Center in direct contrast to the Republican National Convention. Paul received 15 delegate votes (0.63%) for the Republican nomination, falling far short of McCain's 2,343 (98.45%), which cinched him the nomination.

On September 5, 2008, the Constitution Party of Montana removed Chuck Baldwin from their presidential ticket, replacing him with Paul for president and Michael Peroutka for vice president. Paul made an announcement stating that he "was aware that the party planned to do this, and has said that as long as he can remain passive and silent about the development, and as long as he need not sign any declaration of candidacy, that he does not object." However, Paul requested on September 11 that Montana take his name off the ballot, stating that he did not "seek nor consent" to the Montana Constitution Party's nomination. He also suggested the Party list official Constitution Party nominee Baldwin on the Montana ballot instead. Five days later the Montana Secretary of State denied Paul's request for withdrawal, stating that the request was sent to them too late. On September 4, 2008, a list of electors in Louisiana using the label "Louisiana Taxpayers Party" filed papers with the Secretary of State's Office and paid $500. They are pledged to Paul for President and Barry Goldwater, Jr. for vice president.

The same day, Paul made a brief press statement: "On the heels of his historic three-day rally in Minneapolis that drew over 12,000 attendees, Congressman Ron Paul will make a major announcement next week in Washington at the National Press Club." The congressman had reportedly invited presidential candidates Chuck Baldwin, Bob Barr, Cynthia McKinney, and Ralph Nader to the press conference, leading some to speculate that they would endorse Paul running for president on the ticket of either the Constitution, Libertarian or other third party.

On September 10, 2008, Paul confirmed his open endorsement for the four candidates at a press conference in Washington D.C. He also revealed that he had rejected a personal request for an endorsement from John McCain. He later appeared on CNN's The Situation Room with Wolf Blitzer with Nader where they presented and briefly laid out the four principles that all the independent candidates had agreed on as the most important key issues of the presidential race.

On September 22, 2008, Paul announced his support for Chuck Baldwin of the Constitution Party.

In October 2008, Paul was declared an eligible write-in candidate in California.

In the 2008 presidential election, Paul received approximately 47,507 votes.

In May 2011, he announced that he would run again for president in the next election.

== See also ==
- Ron Paul presidential campaign, 2012
- Electoral history of Ron Paul
- Fundraising for the 2008 presidential election
- Opinion polling for the Republican Party (United States) 2008 presidential candidates
- Political positions of Ron Paul
- Draft Ron Paul movement
- Rand Paul 2016 presidential campaign
