= Draft Ron Paul movement =

Efforts to convince Ron Paul to run for a particular office

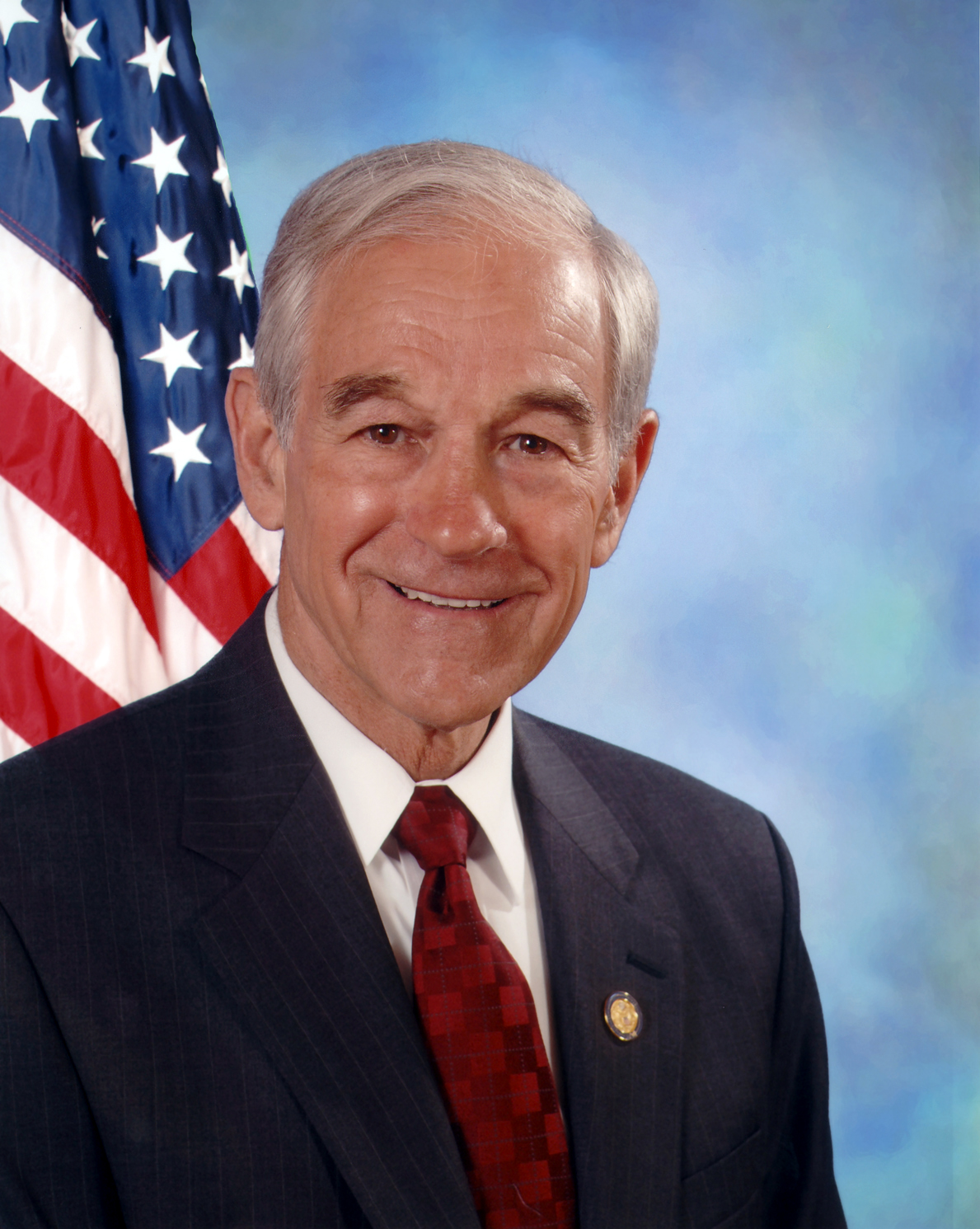
Congressman Ron Paul

The Draft Ron Paul movement refers to any of several grassroots efforts to convince United States Congressman Ron Paul of Texas to run for particular office, often president of the United States, as in the 2008 and 2012 elections.

== Early draft movements ==
Paul was originally drafted to run for Congress as a nonincumbent in elections in 1974, April 1976, and 1978. Democrat Robert Gammage, who lost to Paul in 1978 by some 300 votes, stated he had underestimated Paul's support, particularly among local mothers: "I had real difficulty down in Brazoria County, where he practiced, because he'd delivered half the babies in the county. There were only two obstetricians in the county, and the other one was his partner."

After four terms in Congress, Paul was drafted in 1987 to run for U.S. president with the Libertarian Party. On the ballot in 46 states and the District of Columbia in 1988, Paul's campaign placed third in the popular vote with 432,179 votes (0.5%), behind Republican winner George H. W. Bush and Democrat Michael Dukakis.

In 1995–6, Paul was drafted to run for Congress again, with support from baseball pitcher, constituent, and friend Nolan Ryan (as honorary campaign chair and ad spokesman), as well as tax activist Steve Forbes and conservative commentator Pat Buchanan (both of whom had run presidential campaigns that year). Paul went on to win the election in a close margin. It became the third time Paul had been elected to Congress as a nonincumbent.

== 2001 draft movement ==
An online grassroots petition to draft Paul for the 2004 presidential election, circulated by Independent Citizens and Parties for Congressman Ron Paul for President 2004, garnered several thousand signatures, including appeals to petition Paul made by Murray Sabrin, Dennis P. Slatton of the United America Party–North Carolina, and Constitution Party candidate Mark Dankof. He was also endorsed by Chuck Baldwin and LewRockwell.com economist David R. Henderson, and the movement cited endorsements from the Independent American Party of Minnesota, the Constitution Party of New York, and the Constitution Party of Ohio. On December 11, 2001, Paul told the independent movement that he was encouraged by the fact that the petition had spread the message of Constitutionalism, but did not expect a White House win at that time. Nevertheless, the movement continued through the election cycle and was cited by the Democratic Congressional Campaign Committee for supporting Paul's dissent from George W. Bush's foreign policy.

== 2008 elections ==
Further prompting in 2006-07 led Paul to enter the 2008 presidential race, officially declaring his candidacy on March 12, 2007, after much convincing by a congressional campaign aide, Kent Snyder, as well as a small grassroots effort. Simultaneous Libertarian Party draft efforts were hampered by Paul's run as a Republican. Those publicly calling for Paul to be drafted by the grassroots included political cartoonist Kevin Tuma. After SuperTuesday 2008 and with John McCain the presumptive nominee, economist Edwin Vieira, Jr., called for the Constitutionalist movement to draft Paul for a third-party run for president. Paul's 2008 campaign for the Republican nomination ran until June 12, 2008; declining a third-party run, Paul eventually endorsed Constitution Party candidate Chuck Baldwin for president.

== 2012 elections ==
=== Interelection efforts ===
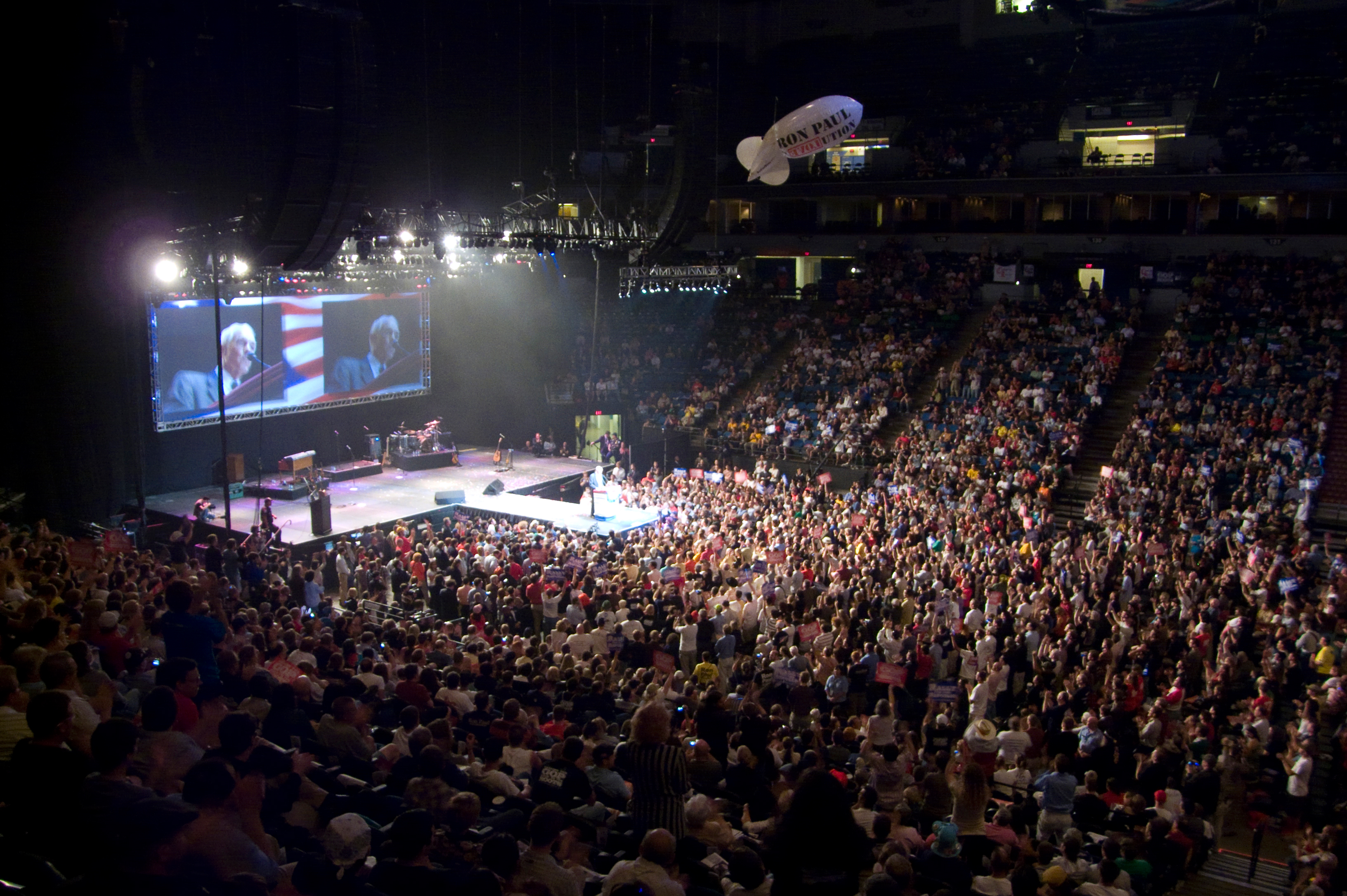
The Rally for the Republic, held on September 2, 2008

Since his run for president in 2008, Paul has become the subject of a significant political following among voters.

In September 2008, Paul also hosted and participated in an event in Minneapolis—St. Paul, Minnesota that coincided with the nearby 2008 Republican National Convention, titled the Rally for the Republic, to protest the Republican convention's refusal to let Paul speak. The rally drew over 10,000 of his presidential campaign supporters, and hosted several speakers, including former Governors Jesse Ventura and Gary Johnson, political commentator Tucker Carlson, Barry Goldwater, Jr., and music artist Aimee Allen.

=== 2010 CPAC Straw Poll ===
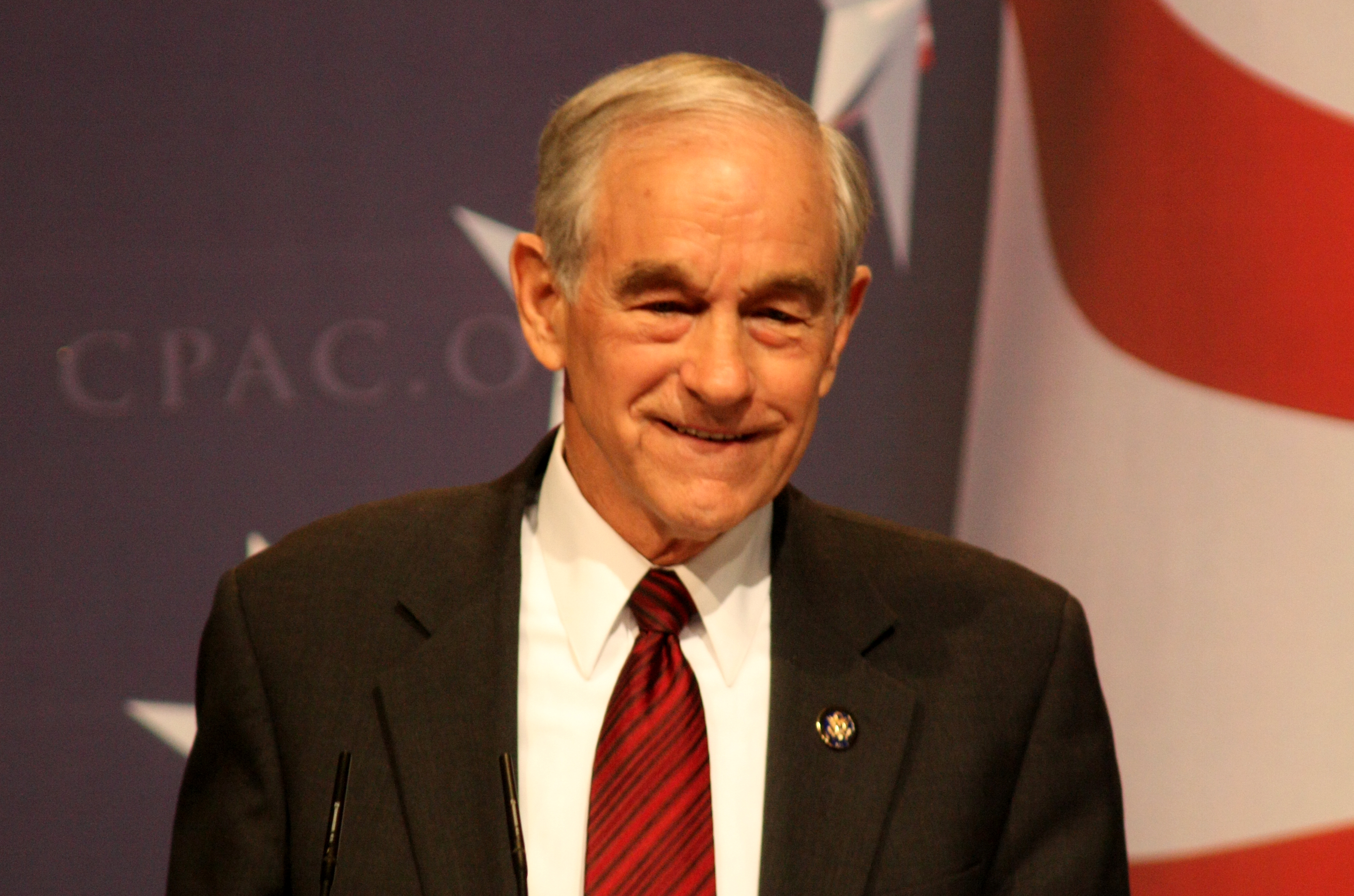
Ron Paul speaking at the 2010 CPAC

Paul won the 2010 CPAC straw poll with the largest percentage ever by any candidate, placing well ahead of other speculated candidates, including Mitt Romney, Sarah Palin and Tim Pawlenty.

Heavily speculated as a possible Republican candidate in the 2012 presidential election, Paul again appeared on the 2010 CPAC Straw Poll. Paul easily won the straw poll and defeated Mitt Romney, who had won the straw poll the previous three years. One possible explanation was that many Tea Party activists turned out at the conference. 54 percent of the participants were between the ages of 18 and 25.

=== 2011 Straw Polls ===
Paul won the major 2011 CPAC Straw Poll on February 12, 2011, with 30 percent of the vote. Following that, Ron Paul won the paid, online Arizona Tea Party Patriots straw poll on February 28, 2011, with 49% of the vote.

=== Liberty PAC ===
Ron Paul in February 2011 asked supporters to donate to his Liberty PAC, to fund trips to Iowa and elsewhere to explore a possible 2012 presidential candidacy. On February 21, a Presidents' Day money bomb raised around $400,000 in 24 hours. Liberty PAC has raised more than $1,000,000 overall since its February relaunch.

== See also ==
- Criticism of the Federal Reserve
- Draft (politics)
