= Jonathan Bydlak =

Independent Political Consultant/ Lobbyist

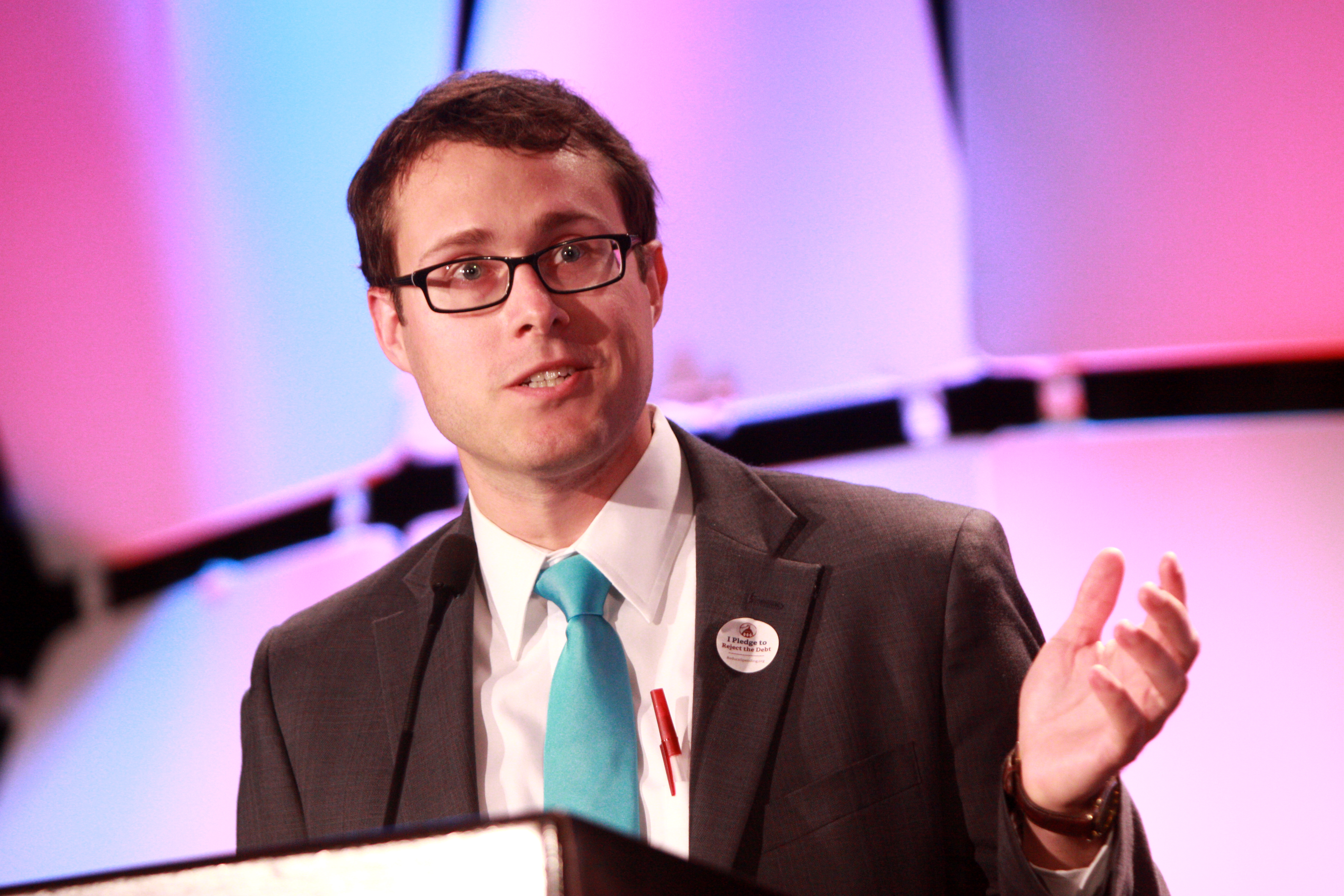
- Bydlak speaking in 2013.
- Born: August 23, 1983 (age 43); Springfield, Massachusetts, U.S.
- Education: Princeton University (A.B.)
- Occupation: Political
- Organization: Coalition to Reduce Spending
- Known for: Ron Paul presidential campaign, 2008, Coalition to Reduce Spending
- Political party: Republican
- Board member of: indysci dot org
- Spouse: Rebekah Bydlak
- Awards: Red Alert Politics 30 under 30

Jonathan Bydlak (born August 23, 1983) is director of the Fiscal and Budget Policy Project at the R Street Institute. He was previously founder and president of the Coalition to Reduce Spending and the Institute for Spending Reform, organizations that support spending reform and reduction. He is the primary promoter of SpendingTracker.org, a real-time government spending tracker, and previously spearheaded the "Reject the Debt Pledge," a pledge signed by candidates and elected officials who promise not to increase spending that is not offset elsewhere and not to vote for budgets that do not lead to balance. In 2020, the Institute officially merged its efforts with those of the R Street Institute.

== Early life ==
Bydlak grew up in Westfield, Massachusetts, and enrolled in Princeton University in 2001. Following a career in the financial sector as a hedge fund analyst, Bydlak joined the Ron Paul presidential campaign, 2008, serving in the capacity of fundraising director. He is also the founder of an independent consulting firm, Bydlak & Associates, LLC, whose clients ranged from federal and state political candidates to advocacy organizations and other non-profits.

== Public life ==
Bydlak has written for USA Today, Rare, The Hill, Forbes, and others. Red Alert Politics has profiled Bydlak, characterizing him as the "next Grover Norquist". This comparison was echoed by ReasonTV's Nick Gillespie, who profiled Bydlak in a piece which characterized him as "The Grover Norquist of Spending Cuts." Business Insider and The Fiscal Times have profiled Bydlak as well. John Stossel wrote a column highlighting the work of the Coalition in a syndicated column featured in Human Events, Reason Magazine, Townhall.com, The Washington Examiner, and the New Hampshire Union Leader

Bydlak has been a featured speaker at Campaign for Liberty's Liberty Political Action Conference, sharing the stage with speakers including Rand Paul, Rep. Thomas Massie, and Morton Blackwell.

=== Coalition to Reduce Spending ===
In 2012, Bydlak founded the Coalition to Reduce Spending (CRS).

The primary policy goal of CRS was to advocate for reduced government spending, with advocacy centered upon its Reject the Debt candidate pledge and SpendingTracker.org, which tracks federal government spending. The latter is now a project of the R Street Institute.

The Coalition is funded by private donors.

=== Reject the Debt Pledge ===
Notable pledge signers include Sen. Ted Cruz (R-TX), Rep. Mark Sanford (SC-1), and Rep. Jim Banks (IN-3).

=== SpendingTracker.org ===
In February 2017, the Coalition launched a database tracking federal spending votes in real time. The tool is hosted publicly at SpendingTracker.org and cross-references Congressional Budget Office scores and public voting record to assign each member of Congress a unique "number," or total new spending he or she is responsible for. The tool has been profiled by FreedomWorks, Watchdog.org, the Cato Institute's Daily Podcast, BlazeTV, and others.
