= Nationwide opinion polling for the 2008 Republican Party presidential primaries =

Nationwide public opinion polls conducted relating to the 2008 Republican presidential candidates, typically using standard statistical methodology, include the following. The public was generally sampled by land-line telephone only, and sometimes asked only about their opinion of certain candidates.

== 2008 ==
Poll Source	MoE	Date(s) administered	Rudy Giuliani	Mike Huckabee	John McCain	Ron Paul	Mitt Romney	Fred Thompson	Others	Undecided/None
Gallup	±3%	Feb. 22–24, 2008	–	21%	63%	6%	–	–	5% (Note: Alan Keyes with 2% and Other with 3%)	5%
Rasmussen	±4%	Feb. 21–24, 2008	–	30%	53%	9%	–	–	—	—
USA Today/Gallup	±4%	Feb. 21–24, 2008	–	23%	61%	4%	–	–	4% (Note: Alan Keyes with 4%)	
Fox News	±3%	Feb. 19–20, 2008	–	34%	51%	7%	–	–	4% (Note: Other with 4%)	5%
Diageo/Hotline Sample Size: 266	±6.0%	Feb. 14–17, 2008	–	25%	53%	7%	–	–	5% (Note: Other with 5%)	10%
Reuters/Zogby	±4.8%	Feb. 13–16, 2008	–	32%	47%	7%	–	–	–	8%
American Research Group	±4%	Feb. 9–13, 2008	–	31%	54%	3%	–	–	–	12%
Associated Press/Ipsos	±5.2%	Feb. 7–10, 2008	–	30%	44%	9%	–	–	1% (Note: Other with 1%)	16%
USA Today/Gallup	±5.0%	Feb. 8–9, 2008	–	27%	53%	—	–	–	–	—
CBS News/New York Times	?	Jan. 30 – Feb. 2, 2008	–	12%	46%	9%	23%	–	3% (Note: Other with 2% and 1% refused to answer)	7%
USA Today/Gallup	±4.0%	Jan. 30 – Feb. 2, 2008	–	—	42%	—	24%	–	–	—
Pew Research	?	Jan. 30 – Feb. 2, 2008	–	20%	42%	5%	22%	–	1% (Note: 1% refused to answer)	10%
ABC News/Washington Post	?	Jan. 30 – Feb. 1, 2008	1%	16%	48%	7%	24%	1%	–	3%
Fox News/Opinion Dynamics	±6%	Jan. 30–31, 2008	–	19%	48%	5%	20%	–	2% (Note: 2% said they would not vote)	5%
NBC News/Wall Street Journal	±3.1%	Jan. 20–22, 2008	15%	23%	29%	4%	20%	–	1%	8%
Los Angeles Times/Bloomberg	?	Jan. 18–22, 2008	12%	18%	22%	6%	17%	10%	2% (Note: Duncan Hunter with 1% and Other with 1%)	13%
Associated Press/Ipsos	?	Jan. 15–17, 2008	14%	16%	22%	4%	16%	9%		18%
CNN	?	Jan. 14–17, 2008	14%	20%	29%	6%	19%	9%	1% (Note: Duncan Hunter with 1%)	4%
USA Today/Gallup	?	Jan. 11–13, 2008	13%	19%	33%	3%	11%	9%	3% (Note: Duncan Hunter with 2% and Alan Keyes with 1%)	–
Rasmussen Reports	?	Jan. 10–13, 2008	11%	20%	23%	3%	13%	12%	–	–
Pew Research	?	Jan. 9–13, 2008	13%	20%	29%	6%	17%	9%	–	–
Diageo/Hotline	?	Jan. 10–12, 2008	12%	17%	32%	4%	15%	7%	6% (Note: Duncan Hunter with 2%, "someone else" with 3%, and 1% refused to answer)	8%
CBS/New York Times	?	Jan. 9–12, 2008	10%	18%	33%	5%	8%	8%	3% (Note: Duncan Hunter with 1% and "someone else" with 2%)	15%
ABC News/Washington Post	?	Jan. 9–12, 2008	15%	20%	28%	3%	19%	8%	3% (Note: Duncan Hunter with 2% and Other with 1%)	4%
Reuters/C-SPAN/Zogby	?	Jan. 10–11, 2008	9%	23%	28%	4%	13%	14%	1%	–
CNN/Opinion Research Corporation	?	Jan 9–10, 2008	18%	21%	34%	5%	14%	6%	1%	–
USA Today/Gallup	?	Jan 4–6, 2008	20%	25%	19%	4%	9%	12%	1%	–
Rasmussen Reports	?	Jan. 3–6, 2008	17%	20%	19%	3%	15%	11%	15% (Note: "Other Response" with 15%)	–

== 2007 ==
=== Sep.–Dec. 2007 ===
Poll Source	Date(s) administered	Rudy Giuliani	Mike Huckabee	John McCain	Ron Paul	Mitt Romney	Fred Thompson	Undecided/None	Others
Rasmussen Reports Poll	Dec 27–30, 2007	15%	16%	17%	7%	16%	12%		
Pew Research	Dec 19–30, 2007	20%	17%	22%	4%	12%	9%		
Fox News Poll	Dec 18–19, 2007	20%	19%	19%	3%	11%	10%		
Rasmussen Reports Poll	Dec 16–19, 2007	16%	22%	13%	6%	16%	12%		
Rasmussen Reports Poll	Dec 15–18, 2007	17%	23%	13%	–	15%	13%		
NBC/WSJ Poll	Dec 14–17, 2007	20%	17%	14%	–	20%	11%		
Rasmussen Reports Poll	Dec 14–17, 2007	18%	23%	11%	–	15%	13%		
USA Today/Gallup Poll	Dec 14–16, 2007	27%	16%	14%	3%	14%	14%		Alan Keyes 3%, Tom Tancredo 1%
Reuters/Zogby Poll	Dec 12–14, 2007	23%	22%	12%	4%	16%	13%		
Battleground Poll	Dec 9–12, 2007	22%	24%	15%	6%	16%	9%		
Rasmussen Reports Poll	Dec 9–12, 2007	20%	23%	8%	6%	14%	10%		
American Research Group Poll	Dec 9–12, 2007	21%	21%	18%	5%	16%	6%	11%	Duncan Hunter 1%, Tom Tancredo 1%, Alan Keyes 0%
Rasmussen Reports	Dec 8–11, 2007	21%	22%	9%	5%	14%	12%		
CNN/Opinion Research Corporation Poll	Dec 6–9, 2007	24%	22%	13%	6%	16%	10%		
CBS News/The New York Times Poll	Dec 5–9, 2007	22%	21%	7%	4%	16%	7%		
Rasmussen Reports	Dec 4–7, 2007	18%	22%	12%	7%	13%	9%		
Rasmussen Reports	Dec 3–6, 2007	18%	21%	11%	8%	12%	11%		
Rasmussen Reports	Dec 2–5, 2007	17%	20%	13%	7%	13%	10%		
Rasmussen Reports	Dec 1–4, 2007	18%	18%	14%	7%	12%	13%		
Rasmussen Reports	Nov 30 – Dec 3, 2007	20%	17%	13%	–	11%	14%		
USA Today/Gallup Poll	Nov 30 – Dec 2, 2007	25%	16%	15%	–	12%	15%		
Rasmussen Reports	Nov 28 – Dec 1, 2007	24%	15%	13%	–	10%	14%		
Rasmussen Reports	Nov 27–30, 2007	24%	13%	13%	–	13%	12%		
Rasmussen Reports	Nov 26–29, 2007	27%	12%	14%	–	14%	10%		
Rasmussen Reports	Nov 15–18, 2007	27%	10%	11%	–	12%	13%		
American Research Group	Nov 9–12, 2007	25%	6%	12%	4%	21%	17%	12%	Duncan Hunter 1%, Tom Tancredo 1%, Alan Keyes 1%
Rasmussen Reports	Nov 7–10, 2007	26%	9%	12%	–	11%	15%		
CNN/Opinion Research Corporation Poll	Nov 2–4, 2007	28%	10%	16%	5%	11%	19%		Tom Tancredo 4%, Duncan Hunter 3%
NBC News/Wall Street Journal Poll	Nov 1–5, 2007	33%	8%	16%	4%	11%	15%	8%	Tom Tancredo 2%, Duncan Hunter 2%, Other 1%
Rasmussen Reports Poll	Oct 19–22, 2007	24%	8%	12%	–	16%	19%		
Rasmussen Reports Poll	Oct 14–17, 2007	27%	7%	10%	–	14%	21%		
Gallup Poll	Oct 12–14, 2007	32%	6%	14%	5%	10%	18%	9%	Sam Brownback 2%, Tom Tancredo 2%, Duncan Hunter 1%
Rasmussen Reports Poll	Oct 11–14, 2007	30%	6%	8%	–	14%	22%		
Rasmussen Reports Poll	Oct 4–7, 2007	23%	5%	9%	–	14%	24%		
Rasmussen Reports Poll	Oct 2–5, 2007	19%	4%	11%	–	16%	21%		
Rasmussen Reports Poll	Sep 23–30, 2007	23%	6%	10%	–	13%	25%	19%	Other 4%
Rasmussen Reports Poll	Sep 16–23, 2007	22%	4%	14%	–	12%	26%	17%	Other 4%
Gallup Poll	Sep 14–16, 2007	30%	4%	18%	4%	7%	22%	10%	Duncan Hunter 2%, Sam Brownback 2%, Tom Tancredo 1%, Other 1%
Rasmussen Reports Poll	Sep 9–16, 2007	19%	5%	13%	–	11%	28%	19%	Other 4%
Harris Interactive Poll	Sep 6–14, 2007	28%	3%	11%	3%	9%	32%		Newt Gingrich 7%, Duncan Hunter 2%, Sam Brownback 2%, Tom Tancredo 1%, Chuck Hagel 0%
FOX News/Opinion Dynamics	Sep 11–12, 2007	34%	2%	16%	2%	8%	22%	12%	Duncan Hunter 3%, Sam Brownback 1%, Chuck Hagel 1%, Tom Tancredo 1%, Other (vol.) 1%, Unsure 11%, Wouldn't vote (vol.) 1%
FOX News/Opinion Dynamics	Sep 11–12, 2007	32%	1%	15%	1%	8%	21%	12%	Newt Gingrich 4%, Duncan Hunter 3%, Sam Brownback 1%, Chuck Hagel 1%, Tom Tancredo 1%, Other (vol.) 1%
NBC News/WSJ	Sep 7–10, 2007	32%	4%	14%	2%	11%	26%	8%	Sam Brownback 1%, Duncan Hunter 1%, Tom Tancredo 1%
CNN/Opinion Research Corporation	Sep 7–9, 2007	28%	5%	15%	1%	11%	27%	8%	Sam Brownback 2%, Tom Tancredo 2%, Duncan Hunter 1%
CNN/Opinion Research Corporation	Sep 7–9, 2007	27%	4%	14%	1%	10%	26%	8%	Newt Gingrich 6%, Tom Tancredo 2%, Sam Brownback 1%, Duncan Hunter 1%
CBS News/New York Times Poll	Sep 4–9, 2007	27%	–	18%	–	14%	22%	10%	Other/None 9%
USA Today/Gallup	Sep 7–8, 2007	34%	5%	15%	1%	10%	22%	8%	Sam Brownback 2%, Chuck Hagel 1%, Tom Tancredo 1%, Duncan Hunter 0%, Someone else 1%
USA Today/Gallup	Sep 7–8, 2007	32%	4%	14%	1%	9%	20%	8%	Newt Gingrich 7%, Sam Brownback 2%, Chuck Hagel 1%, Tom Tancredo 1%, Duncan Hunter 0%, Someone else 1%
Rasmussen Reports Poll	Sep 2–9, 2007	23%	6%	12%	–	13%	24%	17%	Other 4%

=== Jan.–Aug. 2007 ===
Poll Source	Date(s) administered	! class="nowrap ts-vertical-header " style="" | Newt Gingrich	Rudy Giuliani	Mike Huckabee	John McCain	Ron Paul	Mitt Romney	Fred Thompson	Others
Rasmussen Reports Poll	Aug. 30 – Sep. 5, 2007	–	24%	4%	14%	–	14%	22%	
Diageo/Hotline Poll	Aug. 22–26, 2007	–	27%	4%	12%	2%	15%	17%	Duncan Hunter 1%, Sam Brownback 0%, Tom Tancredo 0%, All of these (vol.) 1%, None of these (vol.) 2%, Other (vol.) 1%, Unsure 18%
Rasmussen Reports Poll	Aug. 19–26, 2007	–	24%	5%	12%	–	13%	23%	Other 4%, Undecided 18%
FOX News/Opinion Dynamics	August 21–22, 2007	–	30%	3%	7%	3%	12%	15%	Sam Brownback 1%, Tom Tancredo 1%, Chuck Hagel 0%, Duncan Hunter 0%, Other (vol.) 2%, Unsure 24%, Wouldn't vote (vol.) 3%
FOX News/Opinion Dynamics	August 21–22, 2007	5%	29%	3%	7%	3%	11%	14%	Sam Brownback 1%, Tom Tancredo 1%, Chuck Hagel 0%, Duncan Hunter 0%, Other (vol.) 1%, Unsure 23%, Wouldn't vote (vol.) 3%
Rasmussen Reports	August 12–19, 2007	–	25%	4%	12%	–	14%	21%	Other 4%, Undecided 19%
Gallup	August 13–16, 2007	–	32%	4%	11%	3%	14%	19%	Duncan Hunter 2%, Chuck Hagel 1%, Sam Brownback 1%, Tom Tancredo 1%, Other 1%, None/No opinion 11%
Quinnipiac	August 7–13, 2007	7%	28%	2%	11%	2%	15%	12%	Sam Brownback 1%, Duncan Hunter 1%, Tom Tancredo 1%, Tommy Thompson 1%, Jim Gilmore 0%, Other (vol.) 3%, Wouldn't vote (vol.) 2%, Unsure 16%
American Research Group	August 9–12, 2007	7%	27%	3%	13%	1%	16%	16%	Sam Brownback 1%, Duncan Hunter 1%, Tom Tancredo 1%, Tommy Thompson 1%, Unsure 14%
CBS News	August 8–12, 2007	–	38%	–	12%	–	13%	18%	Other/None 1%, Unsure 18%
Rasmussen	August 5–12, 2007	–	27%	4%	10%	–	14%	22%	Other 5%
Harris Interactivel	August 3–10, 2007	8%	30%	2%	14%	3%	11%	27%	Tom Tancredo 2%, Sam Brownback 1%, Tommy Thompson 1%, Chuck Hagel 1%, Duncan Hunter 0%
CNN/Opinion Research Corporation	August 6–8, 2007	–	29%	3%	16%	2%	12%	22%	Sam Brownback 3%, Tom Tancredo 2%, Tommy Thompson 1%, Duncan Hunter 0%, Unsure 10%
CNN/Opinion Research Corporation	August 6–8, 2007	12%	27%	2%	14%	1%	11%	19%	Sam Brownback 3%, Tom Tancredo 2%, Tommy Thompson 1%, Duncan Hunter 0%, Unsure 8%
USA Today/Gallup	August 3–5, 2007	–	33%	2%	16%	2%	8%	21%	Tommy Thompson 2%, Sam Brownback 1%, Chuck Hagel 1%, Duncan Hunter 1%, Someone else 2%, None (vol.)/Unsure 10%
USA Today/Gallup	August 3–5, 2007	10%	30%	2%	14%	2%	6%	19%	Sam Brownback 1%, Chuck Hagel 1%, Duncan Hunter 1%, Tommy Thompson 1%, Someone else 2%, None (vol.)/Unsure 9%
Rasmussen Reports Poll	July 30 – August 5, 2007	–	25%	3%	11%	–	14%	24%	Sam Brownback 2%, Other 2%
Rasmussen Reports Poll	August 3, 2007	–	26%	–	9%	–	14%	22%	
Newsweek Poll	August 1, 2007	–	30%	2%	13%	2%	10%	22%	Sam Brownback 1%, Duncan Hunter 1%, Tom Tancredo 1%, Tommy Thompson 1%, Other 2%, None/No preference 5%, Don't know 10%
NBC News/Wall Street Journal Poll	July 27–30, 2007	–	33%	1%	17%	2%	11%	20%	Tommy Thompson 2%, Sam Brownback 2%, Duncan Hunter 1%, Tom Tancredo 1%, Other (vol.) 1%, None (vol.) 2%, Not sure 7%
Pew Research Center Poll	July 25–29, 2007	8%	27%	1%	16%	2%	10%	18%	Sam Brownback 1%, Tom Tancredo 1%, Tommy Thompson 1%, Other (vol.) 1%, None (vol.) 3%, Unsure 11%
Rasmussen Reports Poll	July 22–29, 2007	–	25%	–	11%	–	12%	25%	
Diageo/Hotline Poll	July 19–22, 2007	–	20%	1%	17%	2%	8%	19%	Sam Brownback 4%, Tom Tancredo 1%, Tommy Thompson 1%, Duncan Hunter 0%, All of these (vol.) 1%, None of these (vol.) 3%, Other (vol.) 2%, Unsure 21%
ABC News/Washington Post	July 18–21, 2007	–	37%	2%	16%	2%	8%	15%	Tommy Thompson 3%, Duncan Hunter 2%, Sam Brownback 1%, Tom Tancredo 1%, None (vol.) 5%, Wouldn't vote (vol.) 1%, No opinion 5%
ABC News/Washington Post	July 18–21, 2007	7%	34%	2%	16%	2%	8%	14%	Tommy Thompson 3%, Duncan Hunter 2%, Tom Tancredo 2%, Sam Brownback 1%, None (vol.) 5%, Wouldn't vote (vol.) 1%, No opinion 5%
FOX News/Opinion Dynamics Poll ''(without Gingrich)''	July 17–18, 2007	–	27%	3%	17%	2%	10%	17%	Tommy Thompson 1%, Sam Brownback 1%, Tom Tancredo 1%, Chuck Hagel 0%, Duncan Hunter 0%, Other (vol.) 2%, Unsure 20%, Wouldn't vote (vol.) 2%
FOX News/Opinion Dynamics Poll ''(without Gingrich)''	July 17–18, 2007	2%	27%	3%	16%	3%	9%	16%	Tommy Thompson 1%, Sam Brownback 1%, Tom Tancredo 1%, Chuck Hagel 0%, Duncan Hunter 0%, Other (vol.) 2%, Unsure 20%, Wouldn't vote (vol.) 2%
USA Today/Gallup Poll (''without Gingrich'')	July 12–15, 2007	–	33%	2%	16%	3%	8%	21%	Sam Brownback 2%, Duncan Hunter 1%, Tommy Thompson 1%, Jim Gilmore 0%, Chuck Hagel 0%, Tom Tancredo 0%, Someone else 1%, None (vol.)/Unsure 11%
USA Today/Gallup Poll (''without Gingrich'')	July 12–15, 2007	7%	30%	2%	16%	3%	8%	20%	Sam Brownback 2%, Duncan Hunter 1%, Tommy Thompson 1%, Jim Gilmore 0%, Chuck Hagel 0%, Tom Tancredo 0%, Someone else 1%, None (vol.)/Unsure 10%
Rasmussen Reports Poll	July 8–15, 2007	–	23%	3%	12%	–	12%	24%	Other 4%, Undecided 21%
Zogby America Poll	July 12–14, 2007	–	21%	5%	9%	1%	11%	22%	Sam Brownback 2%, Duncan Hunter 1%, Jim Gilmore 0%, Tom Tancredo 0%, Tommy Thompson 0%, Someone else 2%, Unsure 25%
Harris Interactive Poll	July 6–13, 2007	6%	28%	1%	17%	1%	9%	29%	Tom Tancredo 3%, Sam Brownback 2%, Duncan Hunter 2%, Tommy Thompson 1%, Chuck Hagel 1%, Jim Gilmore 0%
American Research Group Poll	July 9–12, 2007	10%	30%	1%	14%	1%	10%	17%	Chuck Hagel 1%, Sam Brownback 1%, Tommy Thompson 1%, Tom Tancredo 1%, Jim Gilmore 1%, Duncan Hunter 1%, George Pataki 0%, Undecided 11%
Rasmussen Reports Poll	July 9–12, 2007	–	24%	2%	12%	–	12%	25%	Sam Brownback 2%, Other 3%, Undecided 20%
Associated Press/Ipsos Public Affairs Poll	July 9–11, 2007	5%	21%	3%	15%	–	11%	19%	Sam Brownback 1%, Other 2%, None 8%, Unsure 15%
USA Today/Gallup	July 6–8, 2007	–	32%	2%	16%	0%	9%	21%	Duncan Hunter 3%, Tom Tancredo 2%, Tommy Thompson 2%, Sam Brownback 1%, Chuck Hagel 1%, Jim Gilmore 0%, Someone else 0%, None (vol.)/Unsure 10%
USA Today/Gallup	July 6–8, 2007	6%	30%	2%	16%	0%	9%	20%	Duncan Hunter 2%, Tom Tancredo 2%, Sam Brownback 1%, Chuck Hagel 1%, Tommy Thompson 1%, Jim Gilmore 0%, Someone else 0%, None (vol.)/Unsure 9%
Rasmussen Reports	June 25–28, 2007	–	24%	3%	12%	–	13%	27%	Other 4%, Not sure 18%
FOX News/Opinion Dynamics	June 26–27, 2007	–	31%	3%	18%	0%		18%	Tommy Thompson 2%, Duncan Hunter 1%, Tom Tancredo 1%, Chuck Hagel 1%, Sam Brownback 1%, Jim Gilmore 0%, Other (vol.) 1%, Unsure 12%, Wouldn't vote (vol.) 3%
FOX News/Opinion Dynamics	June 26–27, 2007	8%	29%	3%	17%	0%		15%	Tommy Thompson 2%, Duncan Hunter 1%, Tom Tancredo 1%, Chuck Hagel 1%, Sam Brownback 1%, Jim Gilmore 0%, Other (vol.) 1%, Unsure 11%, Wouldn't vote (vol.) 2%
CNN/Opinion Research Corporation	June 22–24, 2007	–	31%	2%	19%	2%		21%	Tom Tancredo 1%, Sam Brownback 1%, Tommy Thompson 1%, Jim Gilmore 0%, Duncan Hunter 0%
CNN/Opinion Research Corporation	June 22–24, 2007	8%	30%	2%	18%	2%		19%	Sam Brownback 1%, Tom Tancredo 1%, Tommy Thompson 1%
Political Report/RT Strategies	June 21–23, 2007	–	22%	2%	21%	2%	12%	14%	Tommy Thompson 3%, Sam Brownback 1%, Chuck Hagel 1%, Jim Gilmore 1%, Tom Tancredo 1%, Duncan Hunter 0%, Other (vol.) 2%, Not sure 18%
Political Report/RT Strategies	June 21–23, 2007	5%	20%	2%	20%	2%	10%	14%	Tommy Thompson 3%, Sam Brownback 1%, Chuck Hagel 1%, Jim Gilmore 1%, Tom Tancredo 1%, Duncan Hunter 0%, Other (vol.) 2%, Not sure 18%
Newsweek Poll	June 20–21, 2007	–	27%	4%	15%	2%	12%	19%	Michael Bloomberg 2%, Tommy Thompson 2%, Sam Brownback 2%, Tom Tancredo 1%, Jim Gilmore 0%, Duncan Hunter 0%, Other 1%, None/no preference 5%, Unsure 8%
Rasmussen Reports	June 18–21, 2007	–	23%	3%	11%	–	12%	27%	Other (vol.) 7%, Not sure 17%
Cook Political Report/RT Strategies Poll	June 15–17, 2007	3%	20%	2%	16%	2%	7%	15%	Tommy Thompson 3%, Sam Brownback 1%, Jim Gilmore 1%, Chuck Hagel 1%, Duncan Hunter 1%, Tom Tancredo 1%, Other (vol.) 3%, Unsure 24%
Rasmussen Reports Poll (Note: Second poll excludes independent voters.)	June 11–14, 2007	–	27%	2%	10%	–	10%	28%	Sam Brownback 2%, Others 5%, Unsure 18%
Rasmussen Reports Poll	June 11–14, 2007	?	24%	–	10%	–	11%	29%	
USA Today/Gallup Poll	June 11–14, 2007	7%	28%	3%	18%	2%	7%	19%	Tommy Thompson 2%, Sam Brownback 2%, Duncan Hunter 2%, Chuck Hagel 1%, Jim Gilmore 1%, Tom Tancredo 0%, None/Unsure 8%
American Research Group Poll	June 9–12, 2007	12%	24%	1%	20%	1%	10%	15%	Chuck Hagel 1%, Tommy Thompson 1%, Tom Tancredo 1%, Sam Brownback 1%, Jim Gilmore 1%, Duncan Hunter 1%, George Pataki 0%, Undecided 11%
Harris Interactive	June 1–12, 2007	8%	30%	2%	11%	2%	18%	22%	Tom Tancredo 3%, Sam Brownback 2%, Duncan Hunter 1%, Jim Gilmore 1%, Tommy Thompson 1%, Chuck Hagel 1%
NBC News/Wall Street Journal Poll	June 8–11, 2007	–	29%	3%	14%	2%	14%	20%	Tommy Thompson 2%, Tom Tancredo 1%, Sam Brownback 1%, Jim Gilmore 1%, Duncan Hunter 1%, Other (vol.) 1%, None 1%, Not sure 10%
Quinnipiac University Poll	June 5–11, 2007	5%	27%	2%	15%	1%	10%	15%	Duncan Hunter 1%, Tommy Thompson 1%, Sam Brownback 1%, Tom Tancredo 1%, Other (vol.) 2%, Wouldn't vote (vol.) 1%, Unsure 17%
Los Angeles Times/Bloomberg Poll	June 7–10, 2007	9%	27%	3%	12%	–	10%	21%	Tommy Thompson 2%, Duncan Hunter 1%, Sam Brownback 0%, Tom Tancredo 0%, Other (vol.) 1%, Unsure 14%
FOX News/Opinion Dynamics Poll	June 5–6, 2007	8%	22%	3%	15%	2%	10%	13%	Tommy Thompson 2%, Chuck Hagel 1%, Duncan Hunter 1%, Tom Tancredo 1%, Sam Brownback 0%, Jim Gilmore 0%, Other (vol.) 0%, Unsure 19%, Wouldn't vote (vol.) 2%
Associated Press-Ipsos poll	June 4–6, 2007	7%	27%	2%	19%	–	10%	17%	Sam Brownback 3%, Other (vol.) 1%, None 4%, Unsure 10%
USA Today/Gallup Poll	June 1–3, 2007	8%	32%	2%	19%	1%	12%	11%	Tom Tancredo 2%, Tommy Thompson 1%, Sam Brownback 1%, Duncan Hunter 1%, Chuck Hagel 0%, Jim Gilmore 0%, Someone else 1%, None (vol.) 3%, Unsure 6%
ABC News/Washington Post Poll	May 29 – June 1, 2007	9%	32%	2%	19%	1%	9%	11%	Sam Brownback 1%, Jim Gilmore 1%, Duncan Hunter 1%, Tom Tancredo 1%, Tommy Thompson 1%, None of these (vol.) 3%, Wouldn't vote (vol.) 0%, Unsure 8%
McLaughlin & Associates	May 28 – June 1, 2007	5%	24%	1%	17%	0%	7%	18%	Tom Tancredo 1%, Sam Brownback 1%, Duncan Hunter 1%, Tommy Thompson 0%, Jim Gilmore 0%, Unsure 26%
Zogby International	May 17–20, 2007	–	26%	4%	13%	<1%	10%	10%	Sam Brownback 3%, Tom Tancredo 1%, Duncan Hunter 1%, Tommy Thompson 1%, Someone else 4%, Not sure 26%
Diageo/Hotline Poll	May 16–20, 2007	10%	26%	2%	17%	1%	8%	9%	Tom Tancredo 2%, Sam Brownback 2%, Tommy Thompson 1%, Duncan Hunter 1%, Jim Gilmore 1%, Other (vol.) 1%, None (vol.) 2%, Unsure 18%
Rasmussen Reports Poll	May 14–17, 2007	6%	26%	–	18%	–	15%	14%	
Cook Political Report/RT Strategies Poll	May 11–13, 2007	7%	25%	2%	24%	1%	9%	8%	Tommy Thompson 2%, Chuck Hagel 1%, Sam Brownback 1%, Jim Gilmore 1%, Tom Tancredo 0%, Duncan Hunter 0%, Unsure 19%
Rasmussen Reports Poll	May 7–10, 2007	7%	25%	–	18%	–	12%	15%	
CNN/Opinion Research Corporation Poll	May 4–6, 2007	9%	25%	3%	23%	1%	10%	13%	Tom Tancredo 2%, Sam Brownback 2%, Jim Gilmore 2%, Tommy Thompson 1%, Duncan Hunter 1%, Unsure 8%
Rasmussen Reports Poll	Apr 30 – May 3, 2007	8%	25%	–	17%	–	12%	16%	
Cook Political Report/RT Strategies Poll	Apr 27–29, 2007	6%	28%	2%	21%	1%	12%	10%	Tommy Thompson 2%, Tom Tancredo 2%, Chuck Hagel 1%, Sam Brownback 1%, Duncan Hunter 1%, Jim Gilmore 0%, Unsure 13%
NBC News/Wall Street Journal Poll	Apr 20–23, 2007	–	33%	2%	22%	–	12%	17%	Duncan Hunter 1%, Sam Brownback 1%, Other (vol.) 1%, None (vol.) 2%, Unsure 9%
Rasmussen Reports Poll	Apr 16–19, 2007	8%	30%	–	14%	–	11%	14%	
USA Today/Gallup Poll	Apr 13–15, 2007	7%	35%	2%	22%	2%	9%	10%	Jim Gilmore 2%, George Pataki 2%, Tommy Thompson 1%, Sam Brownback 1%, Tom Tancredo 0%, Duncan Hunter 0%, Chuck Hagel 0%, Someone Else 1%, None (vol.) 2%, All/Any (vol.) 0%, Unsure 3%
CNN/Opinion Research Corporation Poll	Apr 10–12, 2007	8%	27%	0%	24%	1%	10%	11%	George Pataki 2%, Sam Brownback 1%, Chuck Hagel 1%, Tom Tancredo 1%, Tommy Thompson 1%, Jim Gilmore 0%, Duncan Hunter 0%, Unsure 13%
Rasmussen Reports Poll	Apr 9–12, 2007	8%	33%	–	19%	–	11%	13%	
Los Angeles Times/Bloomberg	Apr 5–9, 2007	7%	29%	3%	12%	–	8%	15%	Tom Tancredo 3%, Sam Brownback 2%, Duncan Hunter 2%, Tommy Thompson 2%, Someone Else 3%, Don't Know 14%
USA Today/Gallup Poll	Apr 2–5, 2007	10%	38%	1%	16%	2%	6%	10%	Tom Tancredo 2%, George Pataki 2%, Chuck Hagel 1%, Sam Brownback 1%, Duncan Hunter 1%, Jim Gilmore 0%, Other (vol.) 1%, None (vol.) 2%, Unsure 4%
Rasmussen Reports Poll	Apr 2–5, 2007	8%	27%	–	16%	–	12%	14%	
Cook Political Report/RT Strategies Poll	Mar 29 – Apr 1, 2007	9%	34%	2%	17%	0%	6%	10%	Tommy Thompson 3%, George Pataki 2%, Sam Brownback 1%, Jim Gilmore 1%, Tom Tancredo 0%, Chuck Hagel 0%, Duncan Hunter 0%, Unsure 13%
FOX News/Opinion Dynamics Poll	Mar 27–28, 2007	6%	36%	3%	20%	–	6%	9%	Tommy Thompson 2%, Jim Gilmore 1%, Duncan Hunter 1%, Sam Brownback 1%, Chuck Hagel 0%, Other (vol.) 3%, Unsure 10%, Wouldn't vote (vol.) 2%
Time Poll	Mar 23–26, 2007	12%	35%	1%	22%	–	11%	–	Sam Brownback 2%, Jim Gilmore 1%, Chuck Hagel 0%, Tom Tancredo 0%, Other (vol.) 3%, Unsure 11%
Time Poll	Mar 23–26, 2007	14%	35%	–	28%	–	12%	–	Other (vol.) 1%, Will not vote (vol.) 1%, Unsure 9%
Zogby Poll	Mar 22–26, 2007	–	27%	1%	13%	3%	9%	9%	Sam Brownback 2%, Chuck Hagel 1%, Duncan Hunter 1%, Tom Tancredo 1%, Tommy Thompson 1%
USA Today/Gallup Poll	Mar 23–25, 2007	8%	31%	1%	22%	1%	3%	12%	Sam Brownback 3%, Tommy Thompson 2%, Tom Tancredo 1%, Jim Gilmore 0%, George Pataki 0%, Chuck Hagel 0%, Duncan Hunter 0%, Someone else 2%, None (vol.) 3%, All/Any (vol.) 1%, Unsure 9%
Time Poll	Mar 9–12, 2007	10%	40%	2%	20%	–	7%	–	Sam Brownback 2%, Jim Gilmore 1%, Chuck Hagel 1%, Tom Tancredo 0%
Time Poll	Mar 9–12, 2007	13%	43%	–	24%	–	9%	–	
CNN Poll	Mar 9–11, 2007	9%	34%	1%	18%	2%	9%		George Pataki 3%, Jim Gilmore 2%, Sam Brownback 2%, Chuck Hagel 2%, Tom Tancredo 1%, Tommy Thompson 1%
USA Today/Gallup Poll	Mar 2–4, 2007	9%	44%	0%	20%		8%		Tommy Thompson 2%, Sam Brownback 1%, Duncan Hunter 1%, George Pataki 1%, Tom Tancredo 1%, Jim Gilmore 0%, Chuck Hagel 0%
FOX News/Opinion Dynamics Poll	Feb 27–28, 2007	7%	39%	4%	19%	–	6%	–	Sam Brownback 2%, Duncan Hunter 2%, Chuck Hagel 1%, Jim Gilmore 0%, Tommy Thompson 0%
Time Poll	Feb 23–26, 2007	12%	38%	1%	24%	–	7%	–	Sam Brownback 2%, Tom Tancredo 1%, Chuck Hagel 1%, Jim Gilmore 0%
ABC News/Washington Post Poll	Feb 22–25, 2007	15%	44%	2%	21%	1%	4%	–	Tommy Thompson 2%, Sam Brownback 1%, Chuck Hagel 1%, George Pataki 1%, Jim Gilmore 0%, Duncan Hunter 0%, Tom Tancredo 0%
ABC News/Washington Post Poll	Feb 22–25, 2007	–	53%	2%	23%	1%	5%	–	Sam Brownback 2%, Tommy Thompson 2%, Chuck Hagel 1%, George Pataki 1%, Tom Tancredo 1%, Jim Gilmore 0%, Duncan Hunter 0%
Zogby Poll	Feb 22–24, 2007	7%	29%	0%	20%	–	9%	–	Condoleezza Rice 7%, Sam Brownback 4%, Tom Tancredo 1%, Duncan Hunter 1%, Tommy Thompson 0%, Chuck Hagel 0%
Rasmussen Reports Poll	Feb 19–22, 2007	13%	33%	1%	17%	–	10%	–	Sam Brownback 3%, Chuck Hagel 2%
Quinnipiac University Poll	Feb 13–19, 2007	10%	40%	2%	18%	1%	7%	–	Duncan Hunter 2%, Sam Brownback 1%, Tommy Thompson 1%, George Pataki 1%, Tom Tancredo 1%, Jim Gilmore 0%, Chuck Hagel 0%, Someone else 1%, Wouldn't vote 0%, Undecided 15%
Cook Political Report/RT Strategies Poll	Feb 15–18, 2007	13%	32%	1%	23%	–	10%	–	George Pataki 4%, Sam Brownback 2%, Tom Tancredo 2%, Chuck Hagel 1%, Duncan Hunter 1%, Tommy Thompson 1%, Jim Gilmore 1%
Cook Political Report/RT Strategies Poll	Feb 15–18, 2007	20%	–	2%	37%	–	12%	–	George Pataki 6%, Sam Brownback 3%, Tom Tancredo 2%, Jim Gilmore 1%, Chuck Hagel 1%, Duncan Hunter 1%, Tommy Thompson 1%
Cook Political Report/RT Strategies Poll	Feb 15–18, 2007	17%	40%	2%	–	–	14%	–	George Pataki 5%, Sam Brownback 2%, Duncan Hunter 2%, Tom Tancredo 2%, Tommy Thompson 2%, Jim Gilmore 1%, Chuck Hagel 1%
Rasmussen Reports Poll	Feb 12–15, 2007	13%	33%	–	19%	–	8%	–	Sam Brownback 3%, Chuck Hagel 3%
WNBC/Marist Poll	Feb 12–15, 2007	11%	28%	1%	21%	1%	10%	–	George Pataki 2%, Duncan Hunter 1%, Sam Brownback 1%, Tommy Thompson 1%, Tom Tancredo 1%, Chuck Hagel 0%, John H. Cox 0%
USA Today/Gallup Poll	Feb 9–11, 2007	9%	40%	2%	24%	–	5%	–	Sam Brownback 3%, Jim Gilmore 2%, Tommy Thompson 2%, Duncan Hunter 1%, Tom Tancredo 1%, George Pataki 1%, Chuck Hagel 1%
Rasmussen Reports Poll	Feb 5–8, 2007	10%	32%	4%	18%	–	8%	–	
Rasmussen Reports Poll	Jan 29 – Feb 3, 2007	13%	27%	4%	19%	–	9%	–	
FOX News/Opinion Dynamics Poll	Jan 30–31, 2007	15%	34%	0%	22%	–	3%	–	Duncan Hunter 2%, Sam Brownback 1%, Jim Gilmore 0%, Tommy Thompson 0%, Chuck Hagel 0%
Time Poll	Jan 22–23, 2007	14%	26%	1%	30%	–	5%	–	Sam Brownback 3%, George Pataki 2%, Tom Tancredo 1%, Chuck Hagel 1%, Jim Gilmore 3%
CNN Poll	Jan 12–14, 2007	9%	32%	1%	26%	1%	7%	–	Mike Pence 30%, Jim Gilmore 3%, George Pataki 3%, Sam Brownback 2%, Chuck Hagel 1%, Duncan Hunter 1%, Tom Tancredo 1%, Tommy Thompson 1%
ABC News/Washington Post Poll	Jan 12–14, 2007	9%	34%	1%	27%	1%	9%	–	George Pataki 2%, Sam Brownback 1%, Jim Gilmore 1%, Tom Tancredo 1%, Tommy Thompson 1%, Chuck Hagel 0%, Duncan Hunter 0%
Gallup Poll	Jan 12–14, 2007	10%	31%	1%	27%	–	7%	–	George Pataki 3%, Tommy Thompson 2%, Jim Gilmore 2%, Sam Brownback 1%, Chuck Hagel 1%, Condoleezza Rice (vol.) 1%, Duncan Hunter 0%
Rasmussen Reports Poll	Jan 8–11, 2007	14%	28%	–	20%	–	8%	–	

== Before 2007 ==
Poll Source	Date	George Allen	Bill Frist	Newt Gingrich	Rudy Giuliani	John McCain	Condoleezza Rice	Mitt Romney	Others
USA Today/Gallup Poll	Dec 11–14, 2006	2%	–	8%	28%	28%	12%	4%	Mike Huckabee 2%, Sam Brownback 2%, Tommy Thompson 2%, Chuck Hagel 1%, George Pataki 1%, Duncan Hunter 1%
NBC News/Wall Street Journal Poll	Dec 8–11, 2006	–	–	10%	34%	29%	–	8%	Sam Brownback 2%, Mike Huckabee 2%, George Pataki 1%, Tommy Thompson 1%
ABC News/Washington Post Poll	Dec 7–11, 2006	–	–	12%	34%	26%	–	5%	George Pataki 3%, Tommy Thompson 2%, Sam Brownback 1%, Duncan Hunter 1%, Chuck Hagel 0%, Mike Huckabee 0%, Tom Tancredo 0%
FOX News/Opinion Dynamics Poll	Dec 5–6, 2006	–	–	9%	30%	23%	–	8%	Sam Brownback 3%, George Pataki 2%, Duncan Hunter 1%, Chuck Hagel 0%
Rasmussen Reports Poll	Nov 28 – Dec 4, 2006	–	–	14%	31%	22%	–	–	
WNBC/Marist Poll	Nov 27 – Dec 3, 2006	–	3%	8%	24%	23%	15%	4%	Chuck Hagel 2%, Tommy Thompson 1%, Mike Huckabee 1%, Tom Tancredo 1%, George Pataki 1%, Sam Brownback 0%, Duncan Hunter 0%
CNN Poll	Nov 9–12, 2006	–	3%	9%	33%	30%	–	9%	Tommy Thompson 3%, Sam Brownback 2%, Duncan Hunter 2%, George Pataki 1%
Pew Research Center Poll	Nov 9–12, 2006	–	4%	6%	27%	26%	20%	7%	Sam Brownback 1%
USA Today/Gallup Poll	Nov 9–12, 2006	2%	4%	7%	28%	13%	13%	5%	George Pataki 1%, Mike Huckabee 1%, Chuck Hagel 1%, Sam Brownback 1%, Duncan Hunter 0%
McLaughlin & Associates Poll (R)	Nov 7, 2006	2%	2%	5%	22%	28%	13%	4%	George Pataki 1%, Mike Huckabee 1%, Sam Brownback 1%, Tom Tancredo 1%, Duncan Hunter 0%
Rasmussen Reports Poll	Nov 4–7, 2006	–	–	–	24%	17%	18%	9%	
CNN Poll	Oct 27–29, 2006	2%	6%	12%	29%	27%	–	7%	George Pataki 5%, Sam Brownback 1%
WNBC/Marist Poll	Sep 18–20, 2006	2%	4%	7%	23%	15%	20%	4%	George Pataki 2%, Sam Brownback 1%, Tom Tancredo 1%
FOX News/Opinion Dynamics Poll	Aug 29–30, 2006	3%	2%	14%	27%	25%	–	5%	George Pataki 4%, Chuck Hagel 3%
Cook Political Report/RT Strategies Poll	Aug 25–27, 2006	4%	8%	10%	32%	20%	–	5%	Mike Huckabee 2%, Sam Brownback 1%, George Pataki 1%, Chuck Hagel 0%
Pew Research Center Poll	Aug 9–13, 2006	5%	3%	9%	24%	20%	21%	4%	Sam Brownback 1%
Cook Political Report/RT Strategies Poll	Jun 1–4, 2006	3%	5%	6%	24%	29%	–	8%	George Pataki 4%, Tom Tancredo 3%, Sam Brownback 1%, Chuck Hagel 1%, Mike Huckabee 0%
Gallup Poll	Jun 1–4, 2006	5%	6%	8%	29%	25%	–	6%	Sam Brownback 2%, Mike Huckabee 2%, George Pataki 1%
Diageo/Hotline Poll	Mar 16–19, 2006	3%	–	–	23%	25%	–	4%	Mike Pence 17%, Mark Sanford 15%, George Pataki 2%, Chuck Hagel 1%, Tom Tancredo 1%
FOX News/Opinion Dynamics Poll	Mar 14–15, 2006	3%	5%	8%	29%	22%	–	4%	George Pataki 2%, Chuck Hagel 1%
Cook Political Report/RT Strategies Poll	Feb 23–26, 2006	–	–	11%	30%	30%	–	–	
WNBC/Marist Poll	Feb 13–15, 2006	2%	2%	5%	22%	22%	22%	4%	George Pataki 2%, Chuck Hagel 1%, Tom Tancredo 1%
CNN/USA Today/Gallup Poll	Feb 9–12, 2006	7%	6%	–	33%	28%	1%	3%	Sam Brownback 1%
CNN/USA Today/Gallup Poll	Dec 9–11, 2005	7%	3%	–	30%	–	18%	2%	Mark Sanford 2%, Haley Barbour 2%
Cook Political Report/RT Strategies Poll	Dec 8–11, 2005	3%	5%	12%	25%	25%	–	4%	Rick Santorum 4%, George Pataki 3%, Mike Huckabee 2%, Mark Sanford 2%, Chuck Hagel 2%, Sam Brownback 1%, Tim Pawlenty 0%
Zogby Poll	Dec 6–8, 2005	3%	3%	4%	17%	19%	12%	2%	Jeb Bush 4%, Tim Pawlenty 2%, Fred Thompson 1%, Mike Huckabee 1%, Sam Brownback 1%, Chuck Hagel 1%, George Pataki 1%, Rick Santorum 0%, Haley Barbour 0%, Mark Sanford 0%
Diageo/Hotline Poll	Nov 11–15, 2005	–	3%	6%	22%	21%	22%	–	
Rasmussen Reports Poll	Nov 8, 2005	–	5%	7%	26%	21%	24%	–	
NBC News/Wall Street Journal Poll	Nov 4–7, 2005	3%	5%	8%	34%	31%	–	3%	Sam Brownback 1%
Marist College Poll	Oct 12–13, 17, 2005	4%	2%	5%	21%	19%	21%	–	Jeb Bush 5%, Sam Brownback 2%, George Pataki 2%, Chuck Hagel 1%, Tom Tancredo 1%
FOX News/Opinion Dynamics Poll	Sep 27–28, 2005	2%	2%	7%	26%	23%	18%	3%	
Gallup Poll	Aug 5–7, 2005	3%	8%	–	27%	24%	19%	4%	George Pataki 3%, Sam Brownback 2%
Zogby Poll (''without Rice, Bush, Cheney'')	Jun 20–22, 2005	–	6%	5%	19%	35%	–	2%	Rick Santorum 2%, George Pataki 2%, Chuck Hagel 1%, Sam Brownback 1%
Zogby Poll	Jun 20–22, 2005	–	4%	5%	11%	29%	11%	2%	Jeb Bush 7%, Dick Cheney 6%, Rick Santorum 1%, George Pataki 1%, Chuck Hagel 1%, Sam Brownback 0%
FOX News/Opinion Dynamics Poll	Jun 14–15, 2005	3%	3%	9%	29%	26%	–	2%	
Marist College Poll	Apr 18–21, 2005	–	3%	8%	27%	20%	–	1%	Rick Santorum 3%, George Pataki 2%, Chuck Hagel 1%, Haley Barbour 1%
Marist College Poll	Feb 14–16, 2005	–	3%	5%	25%	21%	14%	1%	Jeb Bush 7%, Rick Santorum 1%, George Pataki 1%, Bill Owens 2%
CNN/USA Today/Gallup Poll	Feb 10, 2005	–	6%	–	34%	29%	–	–	Jeb Bush 12%, Other 7%
CNN/USA Today/Gallup Poll	Feb 4–6, 2005	–	7%	–	33%	30%	–	–	Jeb Bush 12%, Other 6%
Ipsos-Public Affairs Poll	Dec 17–19, 2004	–	7%	–	29%	25%	–	–	Jeb Bush 7%
Gallup Poll	Nov 7–10, 2004	–	–	–	10%	10%	–	–	Colin Powell 7%, Jeb Bush 3%

== Three-way contest ==
Poll Source	Date	Republican	%	Republican	%	Republican	%
CBS News/New York City Poll	July 9–17, 2007	Rudy Giuliani	37%	John McCain	19%	Mitt Romney	10%
CBS News/New York Times Poll	June 26–28, 2007	Rudy Giuliani	42%	John McCain	26%	Mitt Romney	8%
CBS News/New York Times Poll	May 18–23, 2007	Rudy Giuliani	36%	John McCain	22%	Mitt Romney	15%
CBS News/New York Times Poll	Apr 9–12, 2007	Rudy Giuliani	47%	John McCain	25%	Mitt Romney	10%
Time Poll	Feb 23–26, 2007	Rudy Giuliani	49%	John McCain	30%	Mitt Romney	12%
Time Poll	Dec 5–6, 2006	John McCain	43%	Rudy Giuliani	40%	Mitt Romney	8%
Rasmussen Reports Poll	Nov 28 – Dec 4, 2006	Rudy Giuliani	31%	John McCain	22%	Newt Gingrich	14%

== Two-way contest ==
Poll Source	Date	Republican	%	Republican	%
Fox News/Opinion Dynamics	July 12–15, 2007	John McCain	62%	Mitt Romney	29%
USA Today/Gallup Poll	July 12–15, 2007	Rudy Giuliani	54%	Fred Thompson	34%
USA Today/Gallup Poll	June 11–14, 2007	Rudy Giuliani	53%	Fred Thompson	41%
USA Today/Gallup Poll	June 1–3, 2007	Rudy Giuliani	56%	John McCain	38%
USA Today/Gallup Poll	May 10–13, 2007	Rudy Giuliani	52%	John McCain	42%
USA Today/Gallup Poll	May 4–6, 2007	Rudy Giuliani	56%	John McCain	38%
USA Today/Gallup Poll	Apr 13–15, 2007	Rudy Giuliani	57%	John McCain	39%
USA Today/Gallup Poll	Apr 2–5, 2007	Rudy Giuliani	57%	John McCain	38%
FOX News/Opinion Dynamics Poll	Mar 27–28, 2007	Rudy Giuliani	50%	John McCain	37%
USA Today/Gallup Poll	Mar 23–25, 2007	Rudy Giuliani	54%	John McCain	39%
USA Today/Gallup Poll	Mar 2–4, 2007	Rudy Giuliani	58%	John McCain	34%
Newsweek Poll	Feb 28 – Mar 1, 2007	Rudy Giuliani	59%	John McCain	34%
Newsweek Poll	Feb 28 – Mar 1, 2007	Rudy Giuliani	70%	Mitt Romney	20%
Newsweek Poll	Feb 28 – Mar 1, 2007	John McCain	59%	Mitt Romney	26%
FOX News/Opinion Dynamics Poll	Feb 13–14, 2007	Rudy Giuliani	56%	John McCain	31%
FOX News/Opinion Dynamics Poll	Feb 13–14, 2007	John McCain	55%	Newt Gingrich	28%
USA Today/Gallup Poll	Feb 9–11, 2007	Rudy Giuliani	57%	John McCain	39%
CBS News Poll	Feb 8–11, 2007	Rudy Giuliani	50%	John McCain	21%
Newsweek Poll	Jan 24–25, 2007	Rudy Giuliani	48%	John McCain	44%
Newsweek Poll	Jan 24–25, 2007	Rudy Giuliani	72%	Mitt Romney	17%
Newsweek Poll	Jan 24–25, 2007	John McCain	69%	Mitt Romney	19%
Gallup Poll	Jan 12–14, 2006	Rudy Giuliani	50%	John McCain	42%
FOX News/Opinion Dynamics Poll	Dec 5–6, 2006	Rudy Giuliani	42%	John McCain	40%
FOX News/Opinion Dynamics Poll	Dec 5–6, 2006	John McCain	59%	Mitt Romney	14%
FOX News/Opinion Dynamics Poll	Aug 29–30, 2006	Rudy Giuliani	46%	John McCain	36%
Diageo/Hotline Poll	Mar 16–19, 2006	Rudy Giuliani	42%	John McCain	40%
Fabrizio, McLaughlin & Associates Poll (R)	Nov 14–16, 2004	Rudy Giuliani	42%	John McCain	24%

== Other polls ==
=== Candidate qualities ===
Poll Source	Date	Question	Republican	%	Republican	%	Republican	%
ABC News/Washington Post Poll	Feb 22–25, 2007	Who is the strongest leader?	Rudy Giuliani	63%	John McCain	26%	Mitt Romney	5%
ABC News/Washington Post Poll	Feb 22–25, 2007	Who best understands the problems of people like you?	Rudy Giuliani	51%	John McCain	27%	Mitt Romney	8%
ABC News/Washington Post Poll	Feb 22–25, 2007	Who is the most honest and trustworthy?	Rudy Giuliani	43%	John McCain	29%	Mitt Romney	11%
ABC News/Washington Post Poll	Feb 22–25, 2007	Who has the best experience to be president?	Rudy Giuliani	38%	John McCain	47%	Mitt Romney	6%
ABC News/Washington Post Poll	Feb 22–25, 2007	Who is the most inspiring?	Rudy Giuliani	65%	John McCain	21%	Mitt Romney	6%
ABC News/Washington Post Poll	Feb 22–25, 2007	Who has the best chance of getting elected president in November 2008?	Rudy Giuliani	55%	John McCain	34%	Mitt Romney	4%
ABC News/Washington Post Poll	Feb 22–25, 2007	Who is closest to you on the issues?	Rudy Giuliani	44%	John McCain	29%	Mitt Romney	12%

Poll Source	Date	Question	Republican	%	Republican	%
Gallup Poll	Jan 2007	Who is more likeable?	Rudy Giuliani	74%	John McCain	21%
Gallup Poll	Jan 2007	Who would be better in a crisis?	Rudy Giuliani	68%	John McCain	28%
Gallup Poll	Jan 2007	Who would do more to unite the country?	Rudy Giuliani	65%	John McCain	28%
Gallup Poll	Jan 2007	Who is the better public speaker?	Rudy Giuliani	61%	John McCain	27%
Gallup Poll	Jan 2007	Who is the stronger leader?	Rudy Giuliani	59%	John McCain	37%
Gallup Poll	Jan 2007	Who would perform better in the debates?	Rudy Giuliani	56%	John McCain	37%
Gallup Poll	Jan 2007	Who would manage the government more effectively?	Rudy Giuliani	55%	John McCain	37%
Gallup Poll	Jan 2007	Who has the better chance of defeating the Democratic nominee in the 2008 election?	Rudy Giuliani	55%	John McCain	38%
Gallup Poll	Jan 2007	Who would run the more positive campaign?	Rudy Giuliani	50%	John McCain	38%
Gallup Poll	Jan 2007	Who has the better chance of winning the Republican nominee in the 2008 election?	Rudy Giuliani	47%	John McCain	46%
Gallup Poll	Jan 2007	Who would be respected more by leaders of other countries?	Rudy Giuliani	45%	John McCain	45%
Gallup Poll	Jan 2007	Who is more qualified to be president?	Rudy Giuliani	41%	John McCain	50%
Gallup Poll	Jan 2007	Who would work better with Congress?	Rudy Giuliani	41%	John McCain	52%
Gallup Poll	Jan 2007	Who has higher ethical standards?	Rudy Giuliani	35%	John McCain	50%

Poll Source	Date	Question	Candidate	Yes %	No %
CBS News Poll	Feb 8–11, 2007	Does this candidate have the right temperament?	Rudy Giuliani	76%	12%
CBS News Poll	Feb 8–11, 2007	Does this candidate share your values?	Rudy Giuliani	57%	23%
CBS News Poll	Feb 8–11, 2007	Does this candidate have the right temperament?	John McCain	59%	21%
CBS News Poll	Feb 8–11, 2007	Does this candidate share your values?	John McCain	57%	23%

=== Ideology perceptions ===
Poll Source	Date	Republican	Conservative %	Moderate %	Liberal %	Don't Know %
CBS News Poll	Feb 8–11, 2007	Rudy Giuliani	19%	49%	18%	14%
CBS News Poll	Feb 8–11, 2007	John McCain	25%	42%	16%	17%

== Acceptable president ==
Poll Source	Date	Rudy Giuliani	Fred Thompson	John McCain	Mitt Romney	Newt Gingrich
Gallup Poll	July 19, 2007	74%	59%	57%	53%	49%

== See also ==
- Nationwide opinion polling for the 2008 United States presidential election
- Republican Party (United States)
