= Ron Paul bibliography =

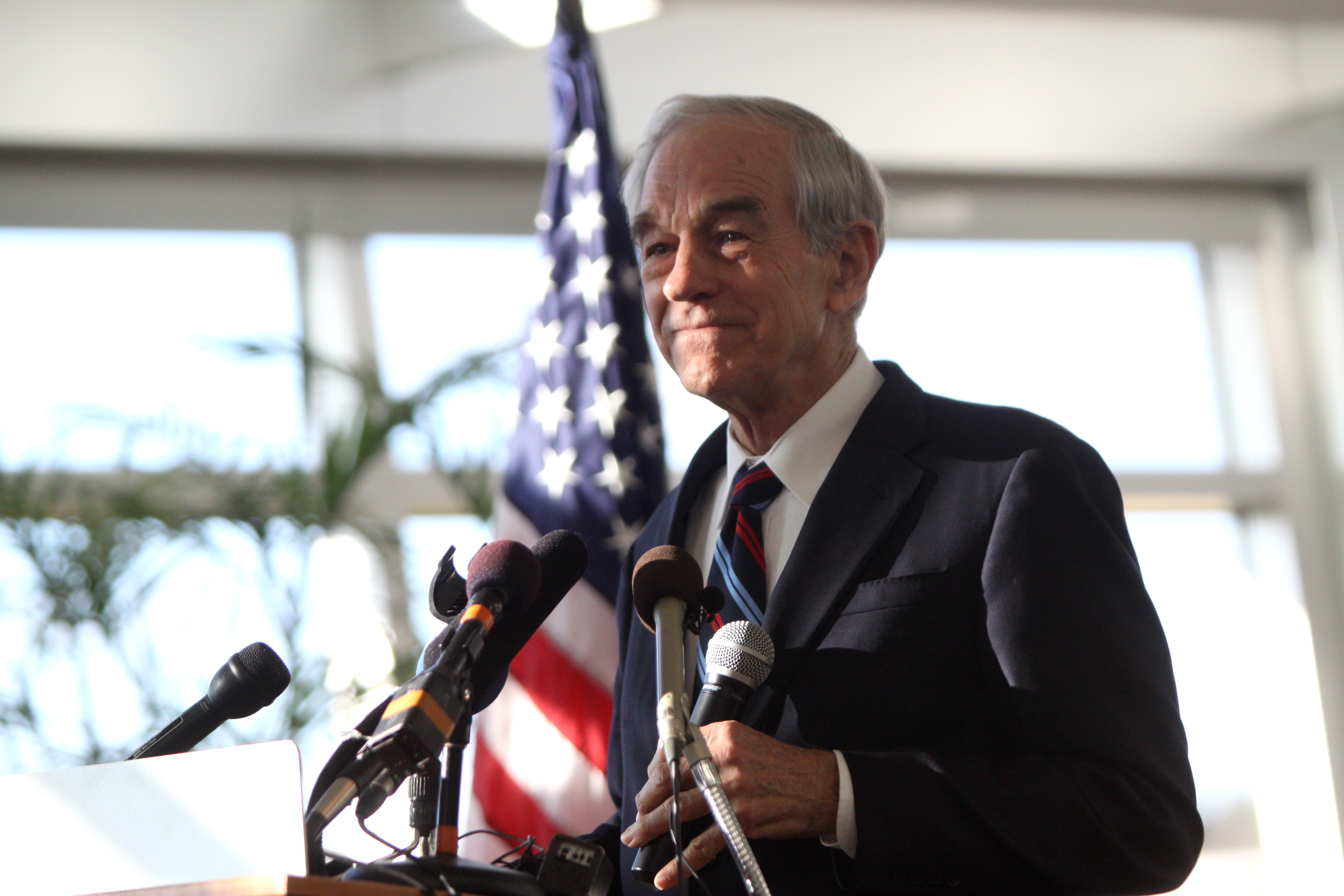
Ron Paul in 2012

This is a bibliography of books and other works written by U.S. Congressman Ron Paul.

== Articles ==
=== Journals ===
- Paul RE, Hayashi TT, Pardo V, Fisher ER (August 1969). "Evaluation of renal biopsy in pregnancy toxemia". Obstet Gynecol. 34: 235–41. PMID 5798269..
- "The Pro-Life Case for the Abortion Pill." Liberty, vol. 4, no. 1 (Sep. 1990).
- "Being Pro-Life is Necessary to Defend Liberty". International Journal of Sociology and Social Policy. 19: 11–13. 1999. doi:10.1108/01443339910788712. OCLC 89482648.
- "Amnesty and Culture: Problems arise when immigrants refuse to assimilate." The Social Contract, vol. 14, no. 2, Special Issue: "France: Once a Nation" (Winter 2003), pp. 132–133.
- "The Banks Versus the Constitution." Harvard Journal of Law and Public Policy, vol. 33, no. 2 (Spring 2010), pp. 463-473.
- "Why I Have Hope." The Austrian, vol. 2, no. 1 (Jan.–Feb. 2016), pp. 4–6. Full issue.
  - Adapted from a lecture given at the Mises Circle in Phoenix, Arizona, on November 7, 2015.

=== Magazines ===
- "Party Faithful." Foreign Policy, no. 182 (Nov. 2010): 17. JSTOR 29764914.
- "Trump's Foreign Policy: An Unwise Inconsistency?" Washington Report on Middle East Affairs, vol. 36, no. 2 (Mar.–Apr. 2017): 14–17. Archived from the original.

=== Symposiums and proceedings ===
- "Libertarianism: Paleo and Con" [a symposium], with Leland B. Yeager, Jane S. Shaw, James S. Robbins, Sheldon L. Richman, Timothy Virkkala, Richard N. Draheim, Jr., and Timothy O'Brien. Liberty, vol. 3, no. 4 (Mar. 1990), pp. 44–50. Full issue.

"In the January Liberty, Llewellyn H. Rockwell, Jr., made 'The Case for Paleolibertarianism,' challenging the libertarian movement to 'delouse' itself of anti-authoritarian and non-Judeo-Christian elements and form an alliance with Paleo-conservatives in the political arena. Several editors and readers of Liberty respond."

=== Online ===
- "Pearl Harbor History." Ron Paul Curriculum (Dec. 7, 2019). "There is still a debate among historians over whether President Roosevelt knew that an attack was imminent. Dr. Gary North teaches the American history course for the Ron Paul Curriculum. He became persuaded in 1958 that Roosevelt did know."

== Audiobooks ==
- Mises and Austrian Economics: A Personal View (1984). Auburn, Ala.: Mises Institute. full text
- Gold, Peace, and Prosperity: The Birth of a New Currency (2008). Narrated by Floy Lilley. Auburn, Ala.: Mises Institute. full text
- The Case for Gold: A Minority Report of the U.S. Gold Commission (2018), with Lewis Lehrman. Narrated by Jim Vann. Auburn, Ala.: Mises Institute. full text
- Foreword to Defending the Undefendable II: Freedom in All Realms (2013), by Walter Block. Narrated by Patrick Smith. East Sussex, UK: Terra Libertas; Auburn, Ala.: Mises Institute (2018). ISBN 978-1908089373. OCLC 923198764. full text

== Books ==
- Gold, Peace, and Prosperity: The Birth of a New Currency (1981). Lake Jackson, Tex: Foundation for Rational Economics and Education. OCLC 7877384.
  - 2nd ed. (2011). Paperback (revised). Foreword by Henry Hazlitt. Preface by Murray Rothbard. Auburn, Ala.: Mises Institute. ISBN 978-1610161961.
- The Case for Gold: A Minority Report of the U.S. Gold Commission (1982). Foreword by Lewis Lehrman. Washington, D.C.: Cato Institute. ISBN 978-0932790316. OCLC 8763972.
  - Originally published in the Congressional Record (Washington, D.C.: Government Printing Office, 1982). Republished by the Cato Institute (1982), with a second printing (1983). The Cato edition was digitized and reissued online by the Mises Institute (2007) with the intention offering the text for free. A second digital edition from the Mises Institute included a new introduction by Llewellyn H. Rockwell, Jr. (2011). ISBN 978-1610161992. OCLC 781486234. The book was most recently published again by the Mises Institute (2018), this time as an audiobook narrated by Jim Vann.
- Abortion and Liberty (1983). Foreword by C. Everett Coop, M.D. Afterword by Doris Gordon. Lake Jackson, Tex: Foundation for Rational Economics and Education. "F.R.E.E. Essay, no. 3." ISBN 978-0912453026. OCLC 9682249.
- Ten Myths About Paper Money: And One Myth About Paper Gold (1983). Lake Jackson, Tex: Foundation for Rational Economics and Education. "F.R.E.E. Essay, no. 2." OCLC 11765863.
- Mises and Austrian Economics: A Personal View (1984). Auburn: Mises Institute. OCLC 19968524. Full audiobook and epub.
  - 2nd ed. (2004). Auburn: Mises Institute.
- Freedom Under Siege: The U.S. Constitution After 200 Years (1987). Lake Jackson, Tex.: Foundation for Rational Economics and Education. OCLC 19697005. Archived.
  - 2nd ed. (2007). Auburn: Mises Institute. OCLC 230800806.
- Challenge to Liberty: Coming to Grips with the Abortion Issue (1990). Lake Jackson, Tex.: Ron Paul Enterprises. OCLC 46960450.
- Money Book (1991). Houston, Tex.: Ron Paul & Associates. OCLC 27353714.

"The monetary writings of Congressman Ron Paul."

- A Republic, If You Can Keep It (2000). Lake Jackson, Tex: Foundation for Rational Economics and Education. OCLC 45414993. Archived from the original.
- The Case for Defending America (2002). Lake Jackson, Tex: Foundation for Rational Economics and Education. OCLC 49744552.
- A Foreign Policy of Freedom: Peace, Commerce, and Honest Friendship (2007). Lake Jackson, Tex.: Foundation for Rational Economics and Education. ISBN 978-0912453002. OCLC 145174995.
- The Revolution: A Manifesto (2008). New York: Grand Central Publishing. ISBN 978-0446537513. OCLC 191881970.
- Pillars of Prosperity: Free Markets, Honest Money, Private Property (2008). Preface by Robert P. Murphy. Foreword by Llewellyn H. Rockwell, Jr. Auburn: Mises Institute. ISBN 978-1933550244. OCLC 225641166.
- End the Fed (2009). New York: Grand Central Publishing. ISBN 978-0446549196. OCLC 318878539.
- Liberty Defined (2011). New York: Grand Central Publishing. ISBN 978-1455501458. OCLC 668192339.
- The School Revolution: A New Answer for Our Broken Education System (2013). New York: Grand Central Publishing. ISBN 978-1-455577170. OCLC 828057047.
- Swords into Plowshares: A Life in Wartime and a Future of Peace and Prosperity (2015). Ron Paul Institute for Peace and Prosperity. ISBN 978-0996426503.

== Book contributions ==
=== Forewords ===
- Foreword to Pieces of Eight, by Edwin Vieira, Jr. Fort Lee, NJ: Sound Dollar Committee (1983). ISBN 978-0815962267. OCLC 9919612.
- Foreword to How to Survive the IRS, by Michael Louis Minns. Fort Lee, NJ: Barricade Books (2001). ISBN 1569801703. OCLC 44860846.
- Foreword to The Party System, by Hilaire Belloc and Cecil Chesterton. Norfolk, VA: IHS Press (2007). Original: London: Stephen Swift (1911).
- Foreword to Meltdown: A Free-Market Look at Why the Stock Market Collapsed, the Economy Tanked, and Government Bailouts Will Make Things Worse, by Thomas E. Woods Jr. Washington, D.C.: Regnery (2009). p. iv.
- Foreword to Lies the Government Told You: Myth, Power, and Deception in American History, by Andrew P. Napolitano. Nashville: Thomas Nelson (2010). pp. iv-vi. ISBN 978-1595552662.
- Foreword to Defending the Undefendable II: Freedom in All Realms, by Walter Block. East Sussex, UK: Terra Libertas (2013); Auburn, Ala.: Mises Institute (2018). pp. ix–xi. ISBN 978-1908089373. OCLC 923198764. full audio
- Foreword to The Underground History of American Education, 2nd ed., by John Taylor Gatto, with an afterword by Richard Grove. New York: Oxford Scholars Press (2017). OCLC 992978582.

Originally published by Oxford Village Press (2001). ISBN 978-0945700043. OCLC 45004688.

=== Introductions ===
- Introduction to The Closing Door, with Mark Skousen, Chris Weber and Michael Ketcher. Bethel, Conn.: Institute for the Preservation of Wealth (1988). ISBN 0938689037.
  - 2nd ed. OCLC 17209571.
- Introduction to Ron Paul Speaks, edited/compiled by Philip Haddad and Roger Marsh. Guilford, Conn: Lyons Press (April 2008). ISBN 978-1599214481. OCLC 199459258.

=== Book chapters ===
- "Abolish the Fed." In: The Liberty Dollar Solution to the Federal Reserve. Edited by Bernard von NotHaus. Evansville, IN: American Financial Press (September 2003). ISBN 0967102529.
- "No form of stem cell research should be federally funded (Chapter 9)." In: Human Embryo Experimentation. Edited by David M. Haugen and Susan Musser. Detroit, Mich: Greenhaven Press (2007). ISBN 978-0737732436. OCLC 84152907.
- "The federal debt is a threat to national security" (Chapters 1–7). In: National Security. Edited by David M. Haugen. Detroit, Mich: Greenhaven Press (2007). ISBN 978-0737737615. OCLC 144227284.

== Book reviews ==
- Review of The Lustre of Gold by Hans F. Sennholz. Freeman, vol. 46, no. 1 (January 1996): 57-58.

== Congressional work ==
- Paul, Ron; Lehrman, Lewis; U.S. Gold Commission (September 1982). The Case for Gold: A Minority Report of the U.S. Gold Commission (PDF). Washington, DC: Cato Institute (2d ed. Ludwig von Mises Institute, 2007). ISBN 0-932790-31-3. OCLC 8763972. (Originally published in the Congressional Record.)
- Upton, Fred, and Paul, Ron (2005). Indecency in the Media: Rating and Restricting Entertainment Content: Should the House Pass H.R. 3717, the Broadcast Decency Enforcement Act?. Washington, DC: Congressional Digest Corp. OCLC 81150568.
- Rangel, Charles B., and Paul, Ron (2006). Compulsory National Service: 2006–2007 Policy Debate Topic: Should the All-Volunteer Force be Replaced by Universal, Mandatory National Service?. Bethesda, MD: Congressional Digest Corp. OCLC 84912971.

== Interviews ==
- Paul, Taylor. "In Defense of our 'Unalienable Rights': An Interview with Congressman Ron Paul, M.D." J. Taylor's Gold & Technology Stocks, vol. 19, no. 5 (May 11, 2000). Archived from the original.
- Interview with Ron Paul. In: Webs of Power: Government Agencies, Secret Societies & Elite Legacies, by Erik Fortman and Randy Lavello. Austin, Tex.: Van Cleave Publishing (2004). ISBN 0975967002. OCLC 61026033.
- Staff writer. "10 Questions." Time, vol. 174, no. 12 (September 28, 2009): 6.

== Multimedia ==
- Born Again (1980), with Sandy Pearl, Bill Beutel, Bob Alis, Dave Weingold, Paul Dave and Ed Bartsch. Athens, GA: University of Georgia Instructional Resources Center. OCLC 7407395.
- The United Nations & the New World Order (2001), with Roscoe Bartlett. Brunswick, OH: American Portrait Films. ISBN 1573411329. OCLC 56793278.
- America: Freedom to Fascism (2006), by Aaron Russo. OCLC 916387682.
- Fiat Empire: Why the Federal Reserve Violates the U.S. Constitution (2007), by Jaeger James, with Ted Baehr, feat. G. Edward Griffin and Edwin Vieira. OCLC 192133806.

=== Debates ===
- "Gold versus Discretion: Ron Paul Debates Charles Partee." A debate on the Gold Standard features Congressman Ron Paul and Charles Partee, member of the Federal Reserve Board of Governors. Presented at the Mises Institute's first conference, "The Gold Standard, An Austrian Perspective" (November 16–17, 1983)

=== Public speaking ===
- Pursue the Cause of Liberty: A Farewell to Congress. Auburn: Mises Institute (2012)
  - Republished (2013) Introduction by Lew Rockwell. ISBN 978-1610165877.

=== Radio ===
- Interview with Lew Rockwell. The Lew Rockwell Show, no. 419 (Oct. 10, 2014).

=== Television ===
- Interview by Peter Slen, on In Depth. C-SPAN Book TV (August 3, 2013)

"Former Representative Ron Paul (R-TX) talked about his life and career. He also responded to viewer questions and comments on topics such as the U.S. economy and foreign policy."

- Interview by Charlie Rose, on the Charlie Rose Show. (September 18, 2013) Full episode.

"Former Congressman Ron Paul explains the Libertarian Party platform and his book about America's educational system, The School Revolution."

== Periodicals (as editor) ==
=== Monthly newsletters ===
- Ron Paul Investment Letter. Ron Paul & Associates. OCLC 27301651.
  - Subscription letter.
- Ron Paul Political Report. Ron Paul & Associates. OCLC 31695178.
  - Subscription letter.
- Ron Paul Survival Report (1993–1996). Ron Paul & Associates. OCLC 27301727.
- Ron Paul's Freedom Report. A monthly publication of the Foundation for Rational Economics and Education. OCLC 38365640, 15124395.
  - vol. 5, no. 9 (November 2001)
  - Special Edition: "Is America a Police State?" (August/September 2002)
  - Special edition (August 2003)
  - vol. 8, no. 7 (July 2004)
  - vol. 9, no. 2 (March 2005)
  - vol. 9, no. 3 (April 2005)
  - vol. 9, no. 7 (August 2006)
  - vol. 9, no. 8 (September 2005)
  - vol. 10, no. 6 (December 2006)
  - vol. 10, no. 11 (December 2006)
  - vol. 11, no. 1 (January 2008)
  - vol. 11, no. 4 (April 2007)
  - vol. 11, no. 9 (September 2007)
  - vol. 16, no. 2 (February 2013)
  - vol. 16, no. 3 (March 2013)
  - vol. 16, no. 4 (April 2013)
  - vol. 16, no. 6 (June 2013)
  - vol. 16, no. 7 (July 2013)
  - vol. 16, no. 8 (August 2013)
  - vol. 16, no. 9 (September 2013)
  - vol. 16, no. 10 (October 2013)
  - vol. 16, no. 11 (November 2013)
  - vol. 16, no. 12 (December 2013)
  - vol. 17, no. 1 (January 2014)
  - vol. 17, no. 2 (February 2014)
  - vol. 17, no. 3 (March 2014)
  - vol. 17, no. 4 (April 2014)
  - vol. 17, no. 5 (May 2014)
  - vol. 17, no. 6 (June 2014)

=== Blogs ===
- Ron Paul Liberty Report (July 2015–present).

=== Reports ===
- Surviving the New Money
  - Subscription letter.

== Speeches ==
- "Is America a Police State?" U.S. House of Representatives (June 27, 2002)
- "Questions That Won't Be Asked About Iraq." U.S. House of Representatives (September 10, 2002)

== Other publications ==
- The Ron Paul Family Cookbook (2012) Introduction by Mrs. Ron Paul.
  - Incl. "The American Dream: Through the Eyes of Mrs. Ron Paul," by Carol Paul (pp. 24–29).

=== Letters ===
- Marketing letter from Congressman Ron Paul (July 1999)
