= Timeline of libertarian thinkers =

This article is a list of major figures in the theory of libertarianism, a philosophy asserting that individuals have a right to be free. Originally coined by French anarchist and libertarian communist Joseph Déjacque as an alternative synonymous to anarchism, American classical liberals appropriated the term in the 1950s for their philosophy which asserts that individuals have a right to acquire, keep and exchange their holdings and that the primary purpose of government is to protect these rights. As a result of this history, libertarians on this list may be either of the American-style free-market variety or of the European-style socialist variety.

== Libertarian thinkers ==
- John Ball (1338–1381): English priest whose preachings against bondship and serfdom helped start the Peasants' Revolt.
- Étienne de La Boétie (1530–1563): French judge, writer and a founder of modern political philosophy in France.
- John Locke (1632–1704): English Philosopher and one of the most influential enlightenment thinkers who proclaimed Man has the Freedom to possess himself. Who also seen as a classical liberal.
- William Godwin (1756–1836): English journalist, political philosopher and novelist. He is considered one of the first exponents of utilitarianism and the first modern proponent of anarchism.
- Josiah Warren (1798–1874): inventor, social theorist and believer in individual sovereignty, who influenced John Stuart Mill and argued that states "commit more crimes upon persons and property than all criminals put together."
- Frédéric Bastiat (1801–1850): French classical liberal theorist, political economist and author of The Law.
- Adin Ballou (1803–1890): American Christian anarchist.
- William Lloyd Garrison (1805–1879): American abolitionist, libertarian and journalist, who influenced Frederick Douglass, ex-slave and anti-slavery crusader.
- Lysander Spooner (1808–1887): American abolitionist, lawyer, entrepreneur, individualist anarchist theorist and author of The Unconstitutionality of Slavery and No Treason.
- Pierre-Joseph Proudhon (1809–1865): French socialist thinker and first person to call themselves an anarchist.
- Stephen Pearl Andrews (1812–1886): American abolitionist who tried to sell Texas to Britain to prevent it becoming a slave state.
- Henry David Thoreau (1817–1862): advocate of minimal or no government and civil disobedience against the authoritarian state; author of Civil Disobedience.
- Gustave de Molinari (1819–1912): French liberal economist and author of The Production of Security in which he argued that security can be produced better through the market than through government monopoly policing.
- Herbert Spencer (1820–1903): British parliamentarian and founder of social Darwinism who advocated the "right of people to ignore the state."
- Auberon Herbert (1838–1906): British parliamentarian, founder of voluntaryism and anti-democrat, who advocated that the voting majority has no more right to decide a man's life than "either the bayonet-surrounded emperor or the infallible church".
- John Sherwin Crosby (1842–1914): American educator, attorney and author of The Orthocratic State (1915) in which he presented a comprehensive justification for the formation of the state and its rightful powers.
- Benjamin Tucker (1854–1939): American editor and publisher of the individualist anarchist periodical Liberty, who Called anarchists "simply unterrified Jeffersonian Democrats."
- Voltairine de Cleyre (1866–1912): American anarchist.
- Albert Jay Nock (1870–1945): American author and editor opposing state socialism and the New Deal in the 20th century and one of the first people to identify as libertarian in the 20th century American sense.
- H. L. Mencken (1880–1956): writer strongly opposed to authoritarian government, who published a periodical containing libertarian authors like Emma Goldman and Albert Jay Nock.
- Ludwig von Mises (1881–1973): Austrian philosopher, economist and author of Human Action. After his death, his name was used for the Mises Institute.
- Volin (1882–1945): Russian anarchist and author of The Unknown Revolution.
- Rose Wilder Lane (1886–1968): American journalist, travel writer novelist, and libertarian political theorist.
- Isabel Patterson (1886–1961): A Canadian-American journalist, novelist, political philosopher, and a leading literary and cultural critic of her day. Historian Jim Powell has called Paterson one of the three founding mothers of American libertarianism, along with Rose Wilder Lane and Ayn Rand.
- Ralph Borsodi (1886–1977): American agrarian theorist, Georgist, founder of The School of Living and author of "The Distribution Age" (1927), "This Ugly Civilization" (1929) and "Flight from the City" (1933).
- Leonard Read (1898–1983): American economist and founder of the Foundation for Economic Education, the United States' first libertarian think-tank.
- Friedrich Hayek (1899–1992): Austrian economist, political thinker and author of The Road to Serfdom.
- Ayn Rand (1905–1982): American philosopher and novelist, whose books The Fountainhead and Atlas Shrugged influenced many towards libertarianism.
- Milton Friedman (1912–2006): Nobel Prize–winning American economist and professor at the University of Chicago, who advocated free-market capitalism in books like Capitalism and Freedom and Free to Choose.
- Vernon Richards (1915–2001): British anarchist and editor of Freedom newspaper.
- Albert Meltzer (1920–1996): British anarchist and editor of Black Flag magazine.
- Murray Bookchin (1921–2006): An American social theorist, author, orator, historian, and political philosopher. A pioneer in the environmental movement, Bookchin formulated and developed the theory of social ecology and urban planning within anarchist, libertarian socialist, and ecological thought.
- Murray Rothbard (1926–1995): American philosopher, economist, historian and the leading theoretician of anarcho-capitalism, who authored For a New Liberty: The Libertarian Manifesto and The Ethics of Liberty.
- Ron Paul (1935–present): American physician, former politician and author of The Revolution: A Manifesto and Liberty Defined, who has been characterized as the intellectual godfather of the Tea Party movement.
- Robert Nozick (1938–2002): American philosopher and author of Anarchy, State, and Utopia.
- David D. Friedman (1945–present): American economist, physicist, legal scholar, and anarcho-capitalist theorist, son of economists Rose and Milton Friedman. Author of The Machinery of Freedom and many other books.
- Samuel Edward Konkin III (1947–2004): American philosopher and author of New Libertarian Manifesto in which he promotes a philosophy he named agorism, a revolutionary form of market anarchism that aims to dissolve the state through counter-economic activity.
- John Stossel (1947–present): American journalist advocating for free markets and minimal government regulation.
- Hans-Hermann Hoppe (1949–present): German-born American Austrian School economist and paleolibertarian anarcho-capitalist philosopher.
- Wendy McElroy (1951–present): Canadian individualist anarchist, individualist feminist and co-founder of The Voluntaryist magazine.
- David Boaz (1953–2024): American author about libertarianism and executive in the Cato Institute think tank.
- Tom Woods (1972–present): American author, Rothbardian anarcho-capitalist and libertarian commentator, senior fellow at the Mises Institute, proponent of the Austrian School of economics, author of 12 books including Meltdown about the 2008 economic collapse.
