= Ron Paul newsletters =

American political publications

Beginning in 1978, for more than two decades, Ron Paul – American physician, libertarian activist, congressman, and presidential candidate – published a variety of political and investment-oriented newsletters bearing his name. The content of some newsletters, which were widely deemed racist, was a source of controversy during his 1996 congressional campaign and his 2008 and 2012 presidential campaigns.

== Background ==
Ron Paul helped found the Foundation for Rational Economics and Education in 1976. This think tank began publishing Ron Paul's Freedom Report newsletter.

In 1984, as he left Congress, Paul also set up Ron Paul & Associates (RP&A), with his wife and daughter and his former congressional chief of staff, Lew Rockwell. The next year, RP&A began publishing several publications including The Ron Paul Investment Letter, The Ron Paul Survival Report, and The Ron Paul Political Report. By 1993, RP&A was earning $940,000 per year. When Paul began working toward returning to Congress in 1995, he gave an interview to C-SPAN in which he described the newsletters as "business-financial", talking about "monetary matters and the gold standard." Most articles did not carry a byline, and many were written in the first person.

== Controversial content ==
The newsletters drew attention for controversial content when raised as a campaign issue by Paul's opponent in the 1996 Congressional election, Charles "Lefty" Morris.

Many articles in these newsletters contained statements that were criticized as racist or homophobic. These statements include, "Given the inefficiencies of what DC laughingly calls the criminal justice system, I think we can safely assume that 95 percent of the black males in that city are semi-criminal or entirely criminal." An October 1992 article said, "even in my little town of Lake Jackson, Texas, I've urged everyone in my family to know how to use a gun in self defense... for the animals are coming." Another newsletter suggested that black activists who wanted to rename New York City in honor of Martin Luther King Jr. should instead rename it "Welfaria," "Zooville," "Rapetown," "Dirtburg," or "Lazyopolis." An article titled "The Pink House" said "I miss the closet. Homosexuals, not to speak of the rest of society, were far better off when social pressure forced them to hide their activities." Another newsletter asserted that HIV-positive homosexuals "enjoy the pity and attention that comes with being sick" and approved of the slogan "Sodomy=Death."

A number of the newsletters criticized civil rights movement activist Martin Luther King Jr., calling him a pedophile and "lying socialist satyr". These articles told readers that Paul had voted against the Martin Luther King Jr. Day federal public holiday, saying "Boy, it sure burns me to have a national holiday for that pro-communist philanderer, Martin Luther King. I voted against this outrage time and time again as a Congressman. What an infamy that Ronald Reagan approved it! We can thank him for our annual Hate Whitey Day." During the 2008 and 2012 presidential election campaigns, Paul and his supporters said that the passages denouncing King were not a reflection of Paul's own views because he considers King a "hero".

In a January 2008 article in The New Republic, James Kirchick, who studied hundreds of Paul's newsletters held at the Kenneth Spencer Research Library at the University of Kansas, and at the Wisconsin Historical Society, wrote that the newsletters "reveal decades worth of obsession with conspiracies, sympathy for the right-wing militia movement, and deeply held bigotry against blacks, Jews, and gays". The newsletters also promoted a conspiratorial attitude toward Israel. One investment letter called Israel "an aggressive, national socialist state"; a 1990 newsletter discussed the "tens of thousands of well-placed friends of Israel in all countries who are willing to work for the Mossad in their area of expertise"; one quoted a "Jewish friend" who said the 1993 World Trade Center bombing was a "setup by the Israeli Mossad".

== Responsibility for articles ==
During the 1996 reelection campaign Paul did not deny writing the newsletters, and defended their content, saying that he opposed racism and his remarks about blacks had been taken out of context.

In March 2001, Paul said he did not write the commentaries, but stopped short of denying authorship in 1996 because his campaign advisers had thought it would be too confusing and that he had to live with the material published under his name. In 2011 Paul's spokesperson Jesse Benton said Paul had "taken moral responsibility because they appeared under his name and slipped through under his watch". Paul himself repudiated the newsletters' content and said he was not involved in the daily operations of the newsletters or saw much of their content until years later.

Numerous sources said Lew Rockwell, who co-founded the firm that published the newsletters and remained an officer throughout its existence, had written the racially charged content. In 2008, the libertarian news magazine Reason reported that "a half-dozen longtime libertarian activists" said that Rockwell had been the chief ghostwriter. Former Ron Paul Chief of Staff John W. Robbins (1981–1985) publicly called on Rockwell to say he wrote the "puerile, racist" newsletters, and stated that "all informed people" believe that Rockwell ghostwrote the newsletters. A New Republic listing of newsletters showed that Rockwell's name appears on newsletters as either contributing editor or editor.

Rockwell said that he was involved in the operations of the newsletters, but denied writing them, saying his role was confined to writing subscription letters. He also said the person who ghost wrote the racially charged pieces "is now long gone" and that he "left in unfortunate circumstances." He has described discussion of the newsletters scandal as "hysterical smears aimed at political enemies."

In January 2012, The Washington Post reported that several of Paul's former associates said that there was no indication that he had written the controversial passages himself, but three people said that Paul had been very involved in the production of the newsletters and had allowed the controversial material to be included as part of a deliberate strategy to boost profits. According to one of the associates, Paul's former secretary (and a self-described supporter of his 2012 Presidential campaign) Renae Hathway, Paul was a "hands-on boss" who would come into the Houston office, about 50 miles (80 km) from home, about once a week. She said, "It was his newsletter, and it was under his name, so he always got to see the final product... He would proof it." She also said, "We had tons of subscribers, from all over the world... I never had one complaint about the content."

Ed Crane, founder and president of the Cato Institute, told Reason that in a discussion with Ron Paul during the period in which the newsletters were published, Paul said his chief source of campaign contributions was the mailing address for the controversial Spotlight magazine. Reason reports that the now defunct magazine, run by Holocaust denier Willis Carto, promoted antisemitism. Paul denied the accusations, telling CNN that Hathway had made up what she had said, and that he had no recollection of the alleged conversation with Crane and did not know what Crane was talking about.

During Paul's 2012 presidential campaign, journalist Ben Swann revisited the newsletters story and reported the name of another author, James B. Powell, found in the byline in a 1993 edition of the Ron Paul Strategy Guide – an article titled "How to Protect Against Urban Violence", with purported racist content. In his report, Swann said the 2008 coverage by The New Republic had reported that only one of the controversial articles had a byline, but had not identified either the specific issue or the name of the author. However, in a Washington Post piece that argued that, "[on] the topic of Ron Paul's racist, homophobic and creepy-cum-conspiratorial newsletters, Swann allows his affection for constitutionalist politics to corrupt his judgment," Kirchick said that Swann's story on Powell consisted of no original reporting and had been previously documented in Kirchick's earlier pieces on the scandal. Kirchick wrote in 2012 that he was disappointed that the media revelations of Paul's newsletters had not curtailed Paul's political career to the degree that seemed possible in 2008.

== See also ==
- Paleolibertarianism
- Ron Paul bibliography
