= Manifesto =

Written declaration of principles and intentions

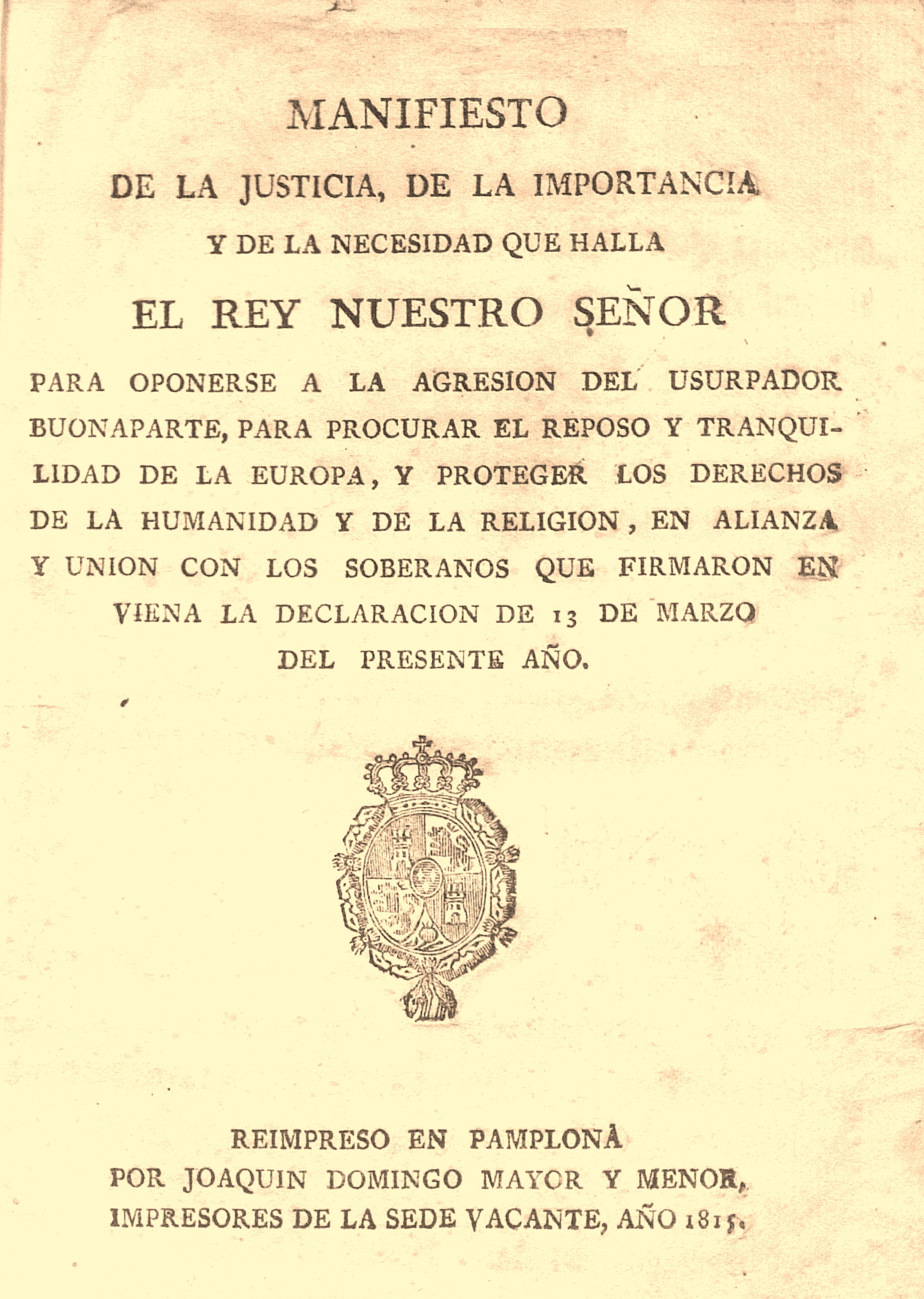
Spanish manifesto against the invasion of Spain during the Peninsular War

A manifesto is a written declaration of the intentions, motives, or views of the issuer, be it an individual, group, political party, or government. A manifesto can accept a previously published opinion or public consensus, but many prominent manifestos—such as those of various artistic movements—reject accepted knowledge in favor of a new idea. Manifestos relating to religious belief are generally referred to as creeds or confessions of faith.

== Etymology ==
The Italian word manifesto, itself derived from the Latin manifestus, meaning "clear" or "conspicuous". Its first recorded use in English is from 1620, in Nathaniel Brent's translation of the Italian from Paolo Sarpi's History of the Council of Trent: "To this citation he made answer by a Manifesto" (p. 102). Similarly, "They were so farre surprised with his Manifesto, that they would never suffer it to be published" (p. 103).

== Features ==
Although the structure of a manifesto is free, there are frequent characteristics that identify it:

- dissertation structure;
- tone of conclamation;
- presence of vocatives;
- the language can vary, depending on a few factors: Who is the manifesto aimed at? Where will it be released? In the newspaper, on the radio, on television? It is customary to prefer formal language, with verbs in the present indicative or imperative tense;
- Body of the text: the problem is identified and analyzed, presenting arguments that validate what has been said. As the text has an argumentative character (it aims to convince the reader of something), solid arguments must be used;
- place, date and signatures: both the signatures of the people who participated in the preparation of the text and those that support what is asserted;
- title: indicates the content of the manifest;
- it differs from the undersigned in that it is not a claim but a declaration of intent.

== Notable examples ==
- The Declaration of Independence of the United States (1776) by the Committee of Five
- The Communist Manifesto (1848) by Karl Marx and Friedrich Engels
- The Manifesto of Futurism (1909) by Filippo Tommaso Marinetti
- Mein Kampf (1925) by Adolf Hitler
- Industrial Society and Its Future (1995) by Theodore John Kaczynski
- The Agile Manifesto (2001) by Martin Fowler and Jim Highsmith
- The Revolution: A Manifesto (2008) by Ron Paul

== See also ==
- Art manifestos
