= Ron Paul Family Cookbook =

Cookbook series

Ron Paul Family Cookbook (1995–present) is a family cookbook series published by Carol Paul, wife of American politician Ron Paul. The cookbooks serve the dual purpose as both a family cookbook and a political fundraiser for Ron Paul's political campaigns. It is more of a pamphlet with earlier versions running about 16 pages and later ones around 32 pages as new recipes are added.

The cookbooks have been reviewed in a Wall Street Journal video and article. It was also reviewed in Slate, The Week, The Seattle Times, The Boston Globe, The Daily Iowan, International Business Times, Smithsonian, and Fox News among other places.

== Editions ==
- 1995 The Ron Paul Family Cookbook
- 1997 The Ron Paul Family Cookbook
- 2000 The Ron Paul Family and Friends Cookbook
- 2002 The Ron Paul Family Spring Cookbook
- 1999 The Ron Paul Family Holiday Cookbook
- 2009 The Ron Paul Family Cookbook 2009
- 2012 The Ron Paul Family Cookbook 2012

== See also ==
- Ron Paul bibliography
