= End the Fed =

2009 book by congressman Ron Paul

- First-edition cover
- Author: Ron Paul
- Language: English
- Genre: Politics, economics
- Publisher: Grand Central Publishing
- Publication date: September 16, 2009
- Publication place: United States
- Media type: Print
- Pages: 224 pp.
- ISBN: 978-0-446-54919-6
- OCLC: 318878539
- Dewey Decimal: 332.1/10973 22
- LC Class: HG2563 .P384 2009
- Preceded by: The Revolution: A Manifesto

End the Fed is a 2009 book by former Congressman Ron Paul of Texas that critiques the United States Federal Reserve System and advocates for its abolition. Paul argues that the Federal Reserve is unconstitutional, economically harmful, and a threat to individual liberty. The book debuted at number six on the New York Times Best Seller list and contends that Federal Reserve policies contribute to economic instability by creating artificial booms and subsequent busts.

The book played a role in popularizing opposition to the Federal Reserve within libertarian and conservative political movements. It received attention in economic and political discourse, with supporters endorsing its critique of monetary policy and critics challenging its assertions. Its publication coincided with increased scrutiny of the Federal Reserve following the 2008 financial crisis and contributed to broader debates on monetary policy, including those associated with the rise of the Tea Party movement.

== Summary ==
Paul argues that "in the post-meltdown world, it is irresponsible, ineffective, and ultimately useless to have a serious economic debate without considering and challenging the role of the Federal Reserve."

In End the Fed, Paul argues that the Federal Reserve was created to bail out banks when they got into trouble. He says that this is bad for competition in banking, as it strengthens the big banks.

Paul argues that the Fed is both corrupt and unconstitutional. He states that the Federal Reserve System is inflating currency today at nearly a Weimar or Zimbabwe level, which Paul asserts is a practice that threatens to put the United States into an inflationary depression where the US dollar, which is the reserve currency of the world, would suffer severe devaluation.

A major theme of the work is the idea of inflation as a hidden tax making warfare much easier to wage. Because people will reject the notion of increasing direct taxes, inflation is then used to help service the overwhelming debts incurred through warfare. In turn the purchasing power of the masses is diminished, yet most people are unaware. Under Ron Paul's theory, this diminution has the biggest impact on low income individuals since it is a regressive tax. Paul argues that the CPI presently does not include food and energy, yet these are the items on which the majority of poor peoples' income is spent.

He further maintains that most people are not aware that the Fed—created by the Morgans and Rockefellers at a private club off the coast of Georgia—is actually working against their own personal interests. Instead of protecting the people, Paul contends that the Fed now serves as a cartel where "the name of the game is bailout", i.e. privatized profits but socialized losses.

Paul also draws on what he argues are historical links between the creation of central banks and war, explaining how inflation and devaluations have been used as war financing tools in the past by many governments from monarchies to democracies.

== Reception ==
Surveys of economists show overwhelming opposition to abolishing the Federal Reserve or undermining its independence. According to Princeton University economist Alan S. Blinder, "mountains of empirical evidence support the proposition that greater central bank independence produces not only less inflation but superior macroeconomic performance, e.g., lower and less volatile inflation with no more volatility in output."

In the book, Paul argues that "the government and its banking cartel have together stolen $0.95 of every dollar as they have pursued a relentlessly inflationary policy." David Andolfatto of the Federal Reserve Bank of St. Louis said the statement was "just plain false" and "stupid" while noting that legitimate arguments can be made against the Federal Reserve.

After an interview with Ron Paul about the book, Jon Stewart of The Daily Show called it "thought provoking" and "clearly from the heart". Advocates for ending the Federal Reserve have called for a return to the gold standard. However, economists overwhelmingly oppose a return to the gold standard, with a consensus arguing that the gold standard would contribute to economic volatility.
