= A Foreign Policy of Freedom =

Compilation of Ron Paul floor speeches

A Foreign Policy of Freedom: Peace, Commerce, and Honest Friendship
- Author: Ron Paul
- Cover artist: John Trumbull
- Language: English
- Subject: international relations, politics, U.S. foreign policy
- Genre: Politics
- Publisher: Foundation for Rational Economics and Education
- Publication date: June 15, 2007
- Publication place: United States
- Media type: Print (paperback)
- Pages: 372 pages
- ISBN: 978-0912453002
- OCLC: 145174995
- Preceded by: Compulsory National Service
- Followed by: Pillars of Prosperity

A Foreign Policy of Freedom: Peace, Commerce, and Honest Friendship is a 2007 compilation of floor speeches to the U.S. House of Representatives by Congressman Ron Paul. They covered a 30-year period and addressed foreign policy. The book was published as an accompaniment to his campaign for the presidency of the United States in the 2008 election. The first edition includes a foreword by Llewellyn H. Rockwell, Jr. It is published by the Foundation for Rational Economics and Education of Lake Jackson, Texas.

The cover depicts detail from the 1817 painting Declaration of Independence, by John Trumbull, "courtesy of Architect of the Capitol".

== Reception ==
Paul and the book were featured on a crowded The Tonight Show on October 30, 2007, and host Jay Leno was able to get Paul to autograph his copy after the show. By March 2008 it had sold "a brisk 37,000 copies".
