= Liberty Defined =

Book by Ron Paul

Liberty Defined: 50 Essential Issues That Affect Our Freedom
- Author: Ron Paul
- Language: English
- Subjects: Libertarianism, Political economy
- Publisher: Grand Central Publishing
- Publication date: 2011
- Publication place: United States
- Media type: Print
- Pages: 324 pp.
- ISBN: 978-1-4555-0145-8
- OCLC: 668192339
- Text: Liberty Defined: 50 Essential Issues That Affect Our Freedom at Portal Conservador

Liberty Defined: 50 Essential Issues That Affect Our Freedom is a 2011 non-fiction book by Congressman Ron Paul (R-TX).

The book came out on April 19, 2011. On release, it was fifth on Amazon's best-selling non-fiction books and nineteenth for all books. For the week ending April 29, 2011, it was fourth on the Wall Street Journal's Best-Seller List. It debuted at #3 on the New York Times non-fiction hardcover best-seller list on April 29 and stayed there the week of May 8.

== Topics ==
Some of the book's philosophical topics include:

- Austrian Economics: A review of the 19th century philosophy underlying much of today's free-market economic outlook.
- Demagogues: The bad guys in the bipartisanship debate, focusing on the "despicable" Pledge of Allegiance and flag-burning issues rampant among Republican demagogues. There's also a chapter on bipartisanship, which Paul doesn't like (a failure of bipartisanship means fewer bad laws).
- Empire: Paul outlines the dangers of military over-extension from the Roman Empire and connects that to the current American Empire. Throughout the book, Paul tosses in statistics about American imperialism and worldwide militarism such as "Government wars and exterminations in the 20th century reached 262 million people killed by their own governments and 44 million people killed in wars." (p. 107)
- Keynesianism: This is the philosophical opposite of Austrian Economics, and is the current underlying philosophy of Bush's & Obama's economic stimulus package,
- Noble Lie: How politicians justify doing whatever they want, by claiming it's good for the country. George W. Bush's advisers fall heavily under this rubric, following Adolf Hitler and others. Julian Assange, the founder of WikiLeaks, is the hero of this chapter, since he exposed the Noble Lies of the U.S. government.
