= The Revolution: A Manifesto =

Book by Ron Paul

- 2008 first-edition cover
- Author: Ron Paul
- Language: English
- Genre: Politics
- Publisher: Grand Central Publishing
- Publication date: April 30, 2008
- Publication place: United States
- Media type: Hardcover
- Pages: 192 pp.
- ISBN: 978-0-446-53751-3
- OCLC: 191881970
- Dewey Decimal: 973.931092 22
- LC Class: E901.1.P38 A3 2008
- Preceded by: A Foreign Policy of Freedom
- Followed by: End The Fed

The Revolution: A Manifesto is a New York Times #1 best seller by Republican former U.S. Congressman Ron Paul. The work was published on April 30, 2008, by Grand Central Publishing. According to Paul, the book is based on written notes during his 2008 presidential campaign. It presents Paul’s libertarian political philosophy, focusing on themes such as constitutionalism, individual liberty, non-interventionism in foreign policy, sound monetary policy, and limited government. The book critiques the expansion of federal authority and advocates for free markets, civil liberties, and a return to the principles outlined by the Founding Fathers.

== Reception ==
Upon release, the book moved to the top of several bestseller lists. It was one of Amazon's Top 10 best sellers, its #1 seller of all political books, and became its #1 seller among all categories. Revolution debuted at #7 on the New York Times nonfiction bestseller list and at #2 on its list of bestselling political books for the period of April 12 to May 3, 2008; some bookstores reported receiving bulk orders. It became #1 on the nonfiction list for the week of May 18, 2008. The book spent its third week on the New York Times best seller list at #7, its fourth at #5, its fifth week at #8 and its sixth week at #10. In its seventh and eighth weeks it was #13 on the list. It took a dip in its ninth week to #22 on The New York Times Bestsellers list and in its 10th week it held steady at #23. As of August 3, 2008 the book is at #24 on the New York Times Best Seller List. On the week of September 15, The Revolution bounced to #10 on the New York Times best seller list and the following week dropped down to #27.

=== Reviews ===
Glenn Reynolds of Instapundit gave the book a favorable, though mixed, review, saying, "The book benefits from many of the Paul campaign's virtues, in the form of accessibility, clarity, and straightforwardness. On the other hand, it also suffers from some of the Paul campaign's vices." Paul Constant at The Stranger likened Paul to an "ancient high-school civics teacher" who "puffs up" at the notion of the Constitution as a "living document."

David Weigel of Reason reviewed the book favorably, comparing Paul's political ideas to those of fellow anti-war conservative Sen. Chuck Hagel. "Paul has a grand unified theory to offer readers, knowing full well that he's opening minds, not programming them," Weigel wrote, adding that Paul "offers readers, first and foremost, the lesson that 'leaders' and universally accepted concepts shouldn't be trusted. It is worried and informed neostructuralists who can change things, not historical 'great men.' If Ron Paul doesn't provide perfect solutions, he certainly provides a blueprint."

In September 2008, The Washington Post reported that the book was "largely written" by Thomas Woods. Woods contends that his role in authoring the book has been "overemphasized" and that "this is Ron Paul's book in every way."
