= Foundation for Rational Economics and Education =

American think tank

- Abbreviation: FREE
- Formation: 1976
- Type: American libertarian organization
- Headquarters: Lake Jackson, Texas, United States
- Leader: Ron Paul
- Revenue: $317,985 (2015)
- Expenses: $411,084 (2015)
- Website: www.the-free-foundation.org

The Foundation for Rational Economics and Education (FREE) is an American libertarian organization. It was founded in 1976 by U.S. congressman Ron Paul, who led the organization.

== Publications ==
At its inception, the foundation began publication of a monthly newsletter, Dr. Ron Paul's Freedom Report, which claimed 100,000 subscribers by 1984. It also publishes monographs, books, and (since 1997) a new series of the monthly newsletter, Ron Paul's Freedom Report (also called just The Freedom Report).

In 1989, FREE established the National Endowment for Liberty (NEFL) in order to develop programs that take advantage of electronic media. NEFL developed and produced the At Issue television series that was seen on the Discovery Network and CNBC, which examines American institutional interaction with Constitutional principles. The endowment has received three grants from the Rodney Fund, operated by Mackinac Center for Public Policy board member James Rodney. FREE also has continuously published 30-second radio spots for economic and social-issue education.

In 2006, the organization had Form 990 revenue of $632,396 and net assets of $458,996. It is categorized for tax-exempt purposes as "religious organization", "publishing activities", and "television" (National Taxonomy of Exempt Entities). Its publications are distributed by Partners Publishers Group. FREE obtains graphic design services for its newsletters from Mark Elam, as president of M&M Graphics and Advertising; Elam also printed more politically charged newsletters as an officer of the for-profit group Ron Paul & Associates (RP&A).

== Ron Paul Institute for Peace and Prosperity ==
The Ron Paul Institute for Peace and Prosperity is a project of the foundation, named for Congressman Ron Paul. The institute advocates for a non-interventionist foreign policy and the protection of civil liberties at home.

== Activism ==
The New York Times Magazine credited FREE as part of the nationwide free-market network which won "one of the stranger Congressional elections of modern times", when Paul defeated incumbent congressman Greg Laughlin in 1996.

Media Transparency reported, without further elaboration, that the 9/11 Public Discourse Project was connected with FREE and NEFL. This project, a nonprofit organization of the ten 9/11 Commissioners, received a $25,000 grant from the Smith Richardson Foundation on December 31, 2004, to allow Commissioner Christopher A. Kojm to "lead an effort to educate the American public on the findings of the 9/11 Commission. He will organize a series of nationwide briefings by the members of the commission at which they will discuss the implications of their findings for U.S. national security."

In 2007, FREE published A Foreign Policy of Freedom, a collection of thirty years of Paul's statements on foreign policy. Paul and the book were featured on a crowded The Tonight Show on October 30, 2007, and host Jay Leno was able to get Paul to autograph his copy after the show.

On January 8, 2008, FREE was implicated by James Kirchick in the controversy surrounding several newsletters published in Paul's name, in that they contained language showing "obsession with conspiracies" and "deeply held bigotry". While most of the more serious newsletters were published by RP&A (the for-profit group) between 1987 and 1992, Kirchick also cited the original FREE newsletter's accusations of conspiracy, such as its statement that the Trilateral Commission "is no longer known only by those who are knowledgeable about international conspiracies, but is routinely mentioned in the daily news. Evidence of its influence on the Republican and Democratic administrations is all about us."

When Paul referred to the "winding down" of the GOP primaries on March 6, 2008, he referred listeners to the continuing fundraising work of FREE and that of his political action committee.

== See also ==
- List of anti-war organizations
