= Ron Paul =

American politician (born 1935)

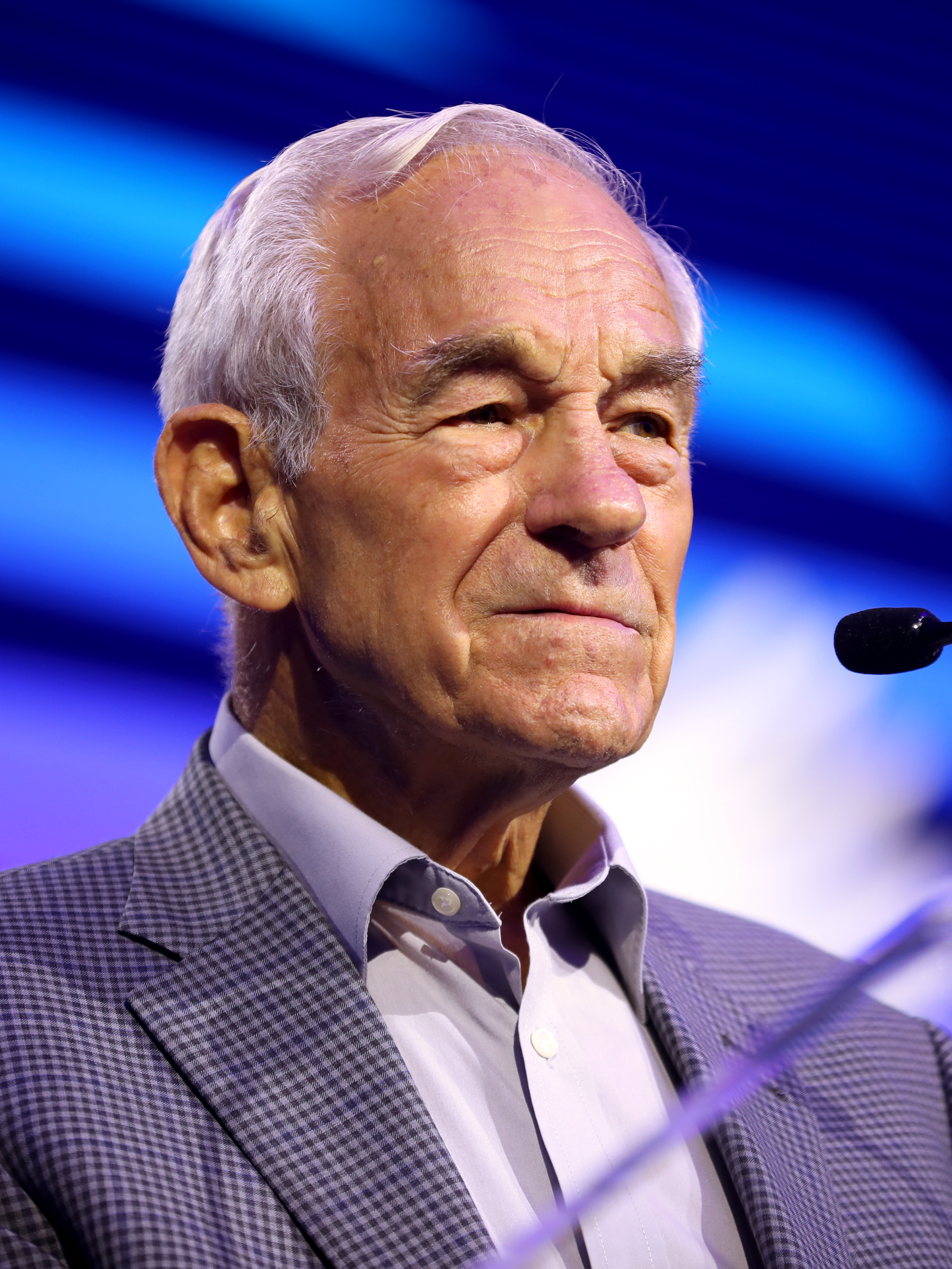
- Paul in 2023

Member of the U.S. House of Representatives from Texas
- In office January 3, 1997 – January 3, 2013
- Preceded by: Greg Laughlin
- Succeeded by: Randy Weber
- Constituency: 14th district
- In office January 3, 1979 – January 3, 1985
- Preceded by: Robert Gammage
- Succeeded by: Tom DeLay
- Constituency: 22nd district
- In office April 3, 1976 – January 3, 1977
- Preceded by: Robert R. Casey
- Succeeded by: Robert Gammage
- Constituency: 22nd district

Personal details
- Born: Ronald Ernest Paul; August 20, 1935 (age 91) Pittsburgh, Pennsylvania, U.S.
- Party: Republican (before 1987, 1996–present)
- Other political affiliations: Libertarian (1987–1996)
- Spouse: Carolyn Wells (m. 1957)
- Children: 5, including Rand
- Relatives: Kelley Paul (daughter-in-law)
- Education: Gettysburg College (BS); Duke University (MD)
- Website: Official website

Military service
- Allegiance: United States
- Branch/service: United States Air Force
- Years of service: 1963–1965; 1965–1968
- Rank: Captain
- Unit: Air National Guard; Texas Air National Guard
- Paul's voice Paul criticizing the interventionist foreign policy Recorded October 17, 2003

Ronald Ernest Paul (born August 20, 1935) is an American author, activist, medical doctor, and former politician who served as the U.S. representative for Texas's 22nd congressional district from 1976 to 1977, and again from 1979 to 1985, as well as for Texas's 14th congressional district from 1997 to 2013. On three occasions, he sought the presidency of the United States, first as the Libertarian Party nominee in 1988, and then as a candidate for the Republican Party in 2008 and 2012.

A self-described constitutionalist, Paul is a critic of several of the federal government's policies, especially the existence of the Federal Reserve and tax policy, as well as the military–industrial complex, the war on drugs, and the war on terror. He has also been a vocal critic of mass surveillance policies such as the Patriot Act and the NSA surveillance programs. In 1976, Paul formed the Foundation for Rational Economics and Education (FREE), and in 1985 was named the first chairman of the conservative PAC Citizens for a Sound Economy, both free-market groups focused on limited government. He has been characterized as the "intellectual godfather" of the Tea Party movement, a fiscally conservative political movement started in 2007 and popularized in 2009 that is largely opposed to interventionism.

Paul served as a flight surgeon in the U.S. Air Force from 1963 to 1968, and worked as an obstetrician-gynecologist from the 1960s to the 1980s. When his son, Rand Paul, was elected as a U.S. senator from Kentucky in 2011, Paul became the first U.S. representative in history to serve concurrently with a child in the Senate. He is a senior fellow and distinguished counselor of the Mises Institute, and has published a number of books and promoted the ideas of economists of the Austrian School, such as Murray Rothbard, Friedrich Hayek, and Ludwig von Mises, during his political campaigns. He has cited President Grover Cleveland as his preferred model of presidency.

After the popularity and grassroots enthusiasm of his 2008 presidential bid, Paul announced in July 2011 that he would not seek reelection to Congress in order to focus on his 2012 bid for the presidency. Finishing in the top four with delegates in both races (while winning four states in the 2012 primaries), he refused to endorse the Republican nominations of John McCain and Mitt Romney during their respective 2008 and 2012 campaigns against Barack Obama. At both the 2008 and 2012 Republican National Conventions, Paul received the second-highest number of delegates, behind only McCain and Romney, respectively.

Paul remained active after his retirement from electoral politics, giving speeches promoting libertarian and libertarian-conservative ideas on college campuses. He also continues to provide political commentary through The Ron Paul Liberty Report, a web show he co-hosts on YouTube. At 81, and despite not running, Paul received one electoral vote from a Texas faithless elector in the 2016 presidential election, making him the oldest person to receive an Electoral College vote.

== Early life, education, and medical career ==
Ronald Ernest Paul was born on August 20, 1935, in Pittsburgh, the son of Howard Caspar Paul (1904–1997), who ran a small dairy company, and Margaret Paul (née Dumont; 1908–2001). His paternal grandfather emigrated from Germany, and his paternal grandmother, a devout Christian, was a first-generation German American. Ron Paul has two older brothers, William and David, and two younger brothers, Jerrold and Wayne. As a junior at suburban Dormont High School, he was the 200-meter dash state champion. Paul went to Gettysburg College, where he was a member of the Lambda Chi Alpha fraternity. He graduated with a B.S. degree in biology in 1957.

Paul earned a Doctor of Medicine degree from Duke University's School of Medicine in 1961, and completed his medical internship at the Henry Ford Hospital in Detroit and his residency in obstetrics and gynecology at Magee-Womens Hospital in Pittsburgh. Paul served as a flight surgeon in the United States Air Force from 1963 to 1965 and then in the United States Air National Guard from 1965 to 1968. Paul and his wife then relocated to Texas, where he began a private practice in obstetrics and gynecology. One child that he helped deliver was famous Tejano singer Selena Quintanilla.

== Early congressional career (1976–1985) ==
While a medical resident in the 1960s, Paul was influenced by Friedrich Hayek's The Road to Serfdom, which caused him to read other publications by Ludwig von Mises and Ayn Rand. He came to know economists Hans Sennholz and Murray Rothbard well, and credits his interest in the study of economics to them. When President Richard Nixon "closed the gold window" by ending American participation in the Bretton Woods System, thus ending on August 15, 1971, the U.S. dollar's loose association with gold, Paul decided to enter politics, and became a Republican candidate for the United States Congress.

=== Elections ===
In 1974, incumbent Robert R. Casey defeated him for the 22nd district. President Gerald Ford later appointed Casey to the Federal Maritime Commission, and Paul won an April 1976 special election to the vacant office after a runoff. Paul lost the next regular election to Democrat Robert Gammage by fewer than 300 votes (0.2%), but defeated Gammage in a 1978 rematch, and was reelected in 1980 and 1982. Gammage underestimated Paul's popularity among local mothers: "I had real difficulty down in Brazoria County, where he practiced, because he'd delivered half the babies in the county. There were only two obstetricians in the county, and the other one was his partner."

=== Tenure ===
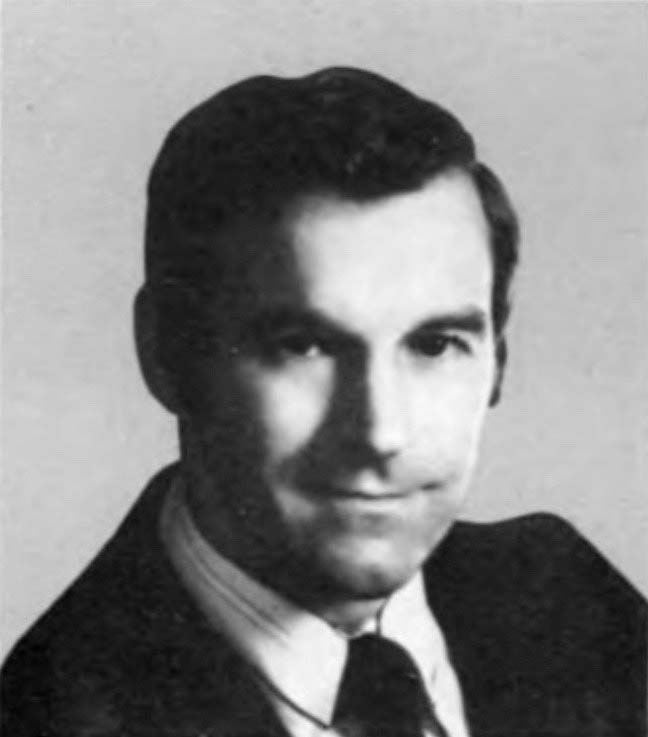
Paul in 1979

Paul served in Congress three different periods: first from 1976 to 1977, after he won a special election, then from 1979 to 1985, and finally from 1997 to 2013. In his early years, Paul served on the House Banking Committee, where he blamed the Federal Reserve for inflation and spoke against the banking mismanagement that resulted in the savings and loan crisis. Paul argued for a return to the gold standard maintained by the U.S. from 1873 to 1933, and with Senator Jesse Helms convinced the Congress to study the issue. He spoke against the reinstatement of registration for the military draft in 1980, in opposition to President Jimmy Carter and the majority of his fellow Republican members of Congress.

During his first term, Paul founded the Foundation for Rational Economics and Education (FREE), a non-profit think tank dedicated to promoting principles of limited government and free-market economics. In 1984, Paul became the first chairman of the Citizens for a Sound Economy (CSE), a conservative political group founded by Charles and David Koch "to fight for less government, lower taxes, and less regulation." CSE started a Tea Party protest against high taxes in 2002. In 2004, Citizens for a Sound Economy split into two new organizations, with Citizens for a Sound Economy being renamed as FreedomWorks, and Citizens for a Sound Economy Foundation becoming Americans for Prosperity. The two organizations would become key players in the Tea Party movement from 2009 onward.

Paul proposed term-limit legislation multiple times. In 1984, he decided to retire from the House in order to run for the U.S. Senate, complaining in his House farewell address that "Special interests have replaced the concern that the Founders had for general welfare... It's difficult for one who loves true liberty and utterly detests the power of the state to come to Washington for a period of time and not leave a true cynic." Paul lost the Republican primary to Phil Gramm, who had switched parties the previous year from Democrat to Republican. Another candidate of the senatorial primary was Henry Grover, a conservative former state legislator who had lost the 1972 gubernatorial general election to Democrat Dolph Briscoe, Jr. On Paul's departure from the House, his seat was filled by former state representative Tom DeLay, who would later become House majority leader.

== Libertarian Party and ventures ==
=== 1985–1997 ===
Following the loss of the 1984 senate race, Paul returned to his obstetrics practice and took part in a number of other business ventures. Along with his former congressional chief of staff, Lew Rockwell, Paul founded a for-profit enterprise, Ron Paul & Associates, Inc. (RP&A) in 1984, with Paul serving as president, Rockwell as vice president, Paul's wife Carol as secretary, and daughter Lori Pyeatt as treasurer. The company published a variety of political and investment-oriented newsletters, including Ron Paul Freedom Report and Ron Paul Survival Report, and by 1993 was generating revenues in excess of $900,000.

Paul also co-owned a mail-order coin dealership, Ron Paul Coins, for twelve years with Burt Blumert, who continued to operate the dealership after Paul resumed office in 1996. Paul spoke multiple times at the American Numismatic Association's 1988 convention. He worked with his Foundation for Rational Economics and Education on such projects as establishing the National Endowment for Liberty, continuing publication of newsletters, and producing the At Issue public policy series that was broadcast on the Discovery Channel and CNBC.

=== 1988 presidential campaign ===
Paul left the Republican Party in 1987 and launched a bid for the presidency running on the Libertarian Party ticket. His candidacy was seen as problematic because of the party's platform position of support for freedom of choice on abortions. Native American activist Russell Means, Paul's rival for the nomination, emphasized that he was in favor of abortion rights. In a forum held prior to the nomination, Means dismissed the greater funds raised by Paul's campaign, commenting that Means was receiving "10 times more press" than the former Congressman and was therefore "100 times more effective".

On September 25, 1988, American psychologist and psychedelic advocate Timothy Leary held a fundraiser for Paul, who attended the event. Journalist Debra Saunders attended and wrote about her experience. In the 1988 presidential election, Paul was on the ballot in 46 states, scoring third in the popular vote with 432,179 votes (0.5%). Paul was kept off the ballot in Missouri due to what the St. Louis Post-Dispatch termed a "technicality," and received votes there only when written in, just as he did in North Carolina.

According to Paul, his presidential campaign was about more than obtaining office; he sought to promote his libertarian ideas, often to school and university groups regardless of vote eligibility. He said, "We're just as interested in the future generation as this election. These kids will vote eventually, and maybe, just maybe, they'll go home and talk to their parents." Paul considered running again for president in 1992, but instead chose to endorse Republican Pat Buchanan that year, and served as an adviser to Buchanan's ultimately unsuccessful presidential primary campaign against incumbent President George H. W. Bush.

== Later congressional career (1997–2013) ==
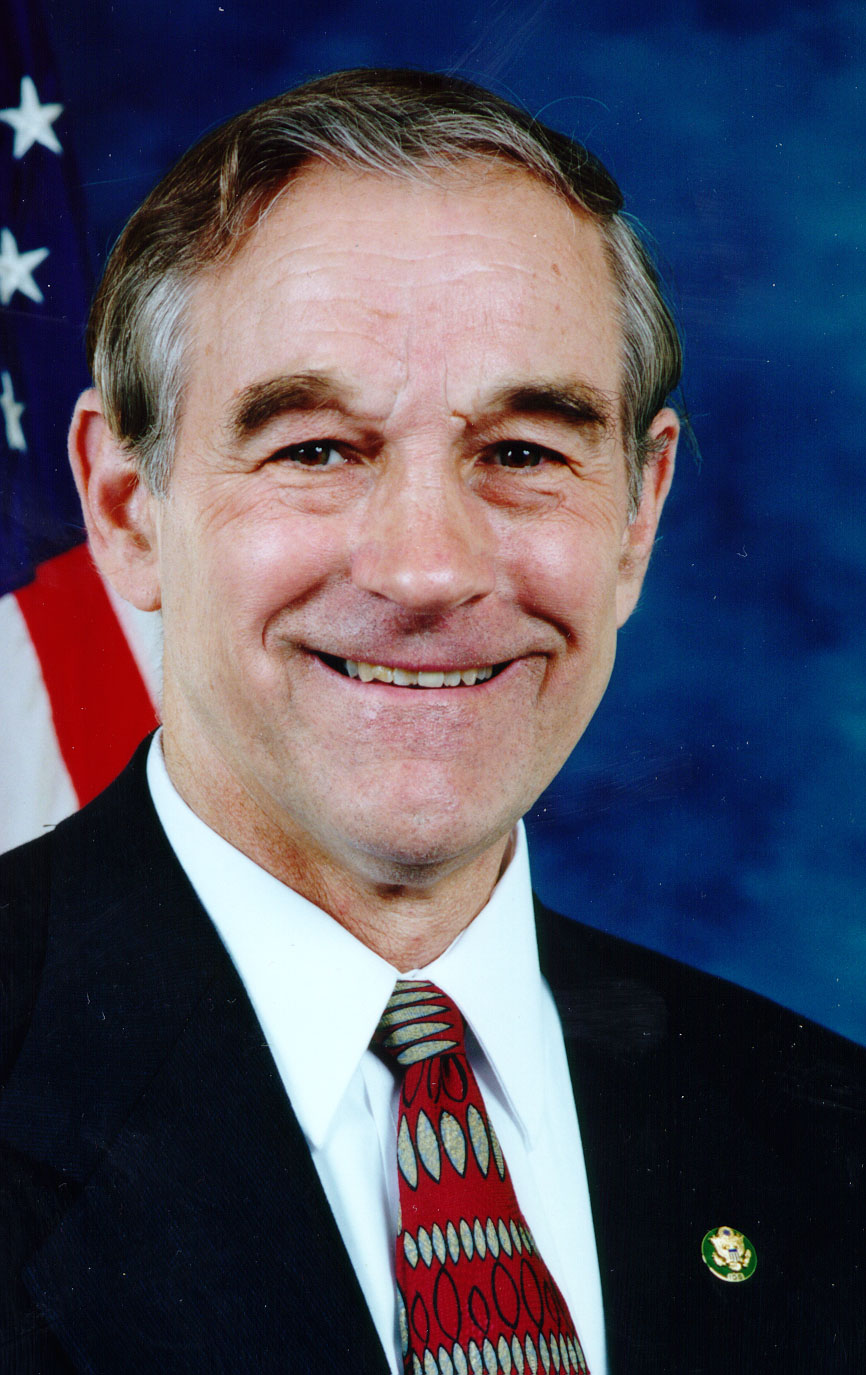
An earlier congressional portrait of Paul, c. 1997

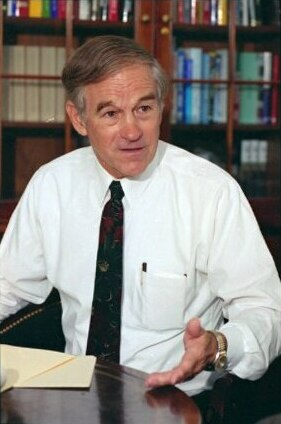
Paul in his Congressional office, September 1999

=== Elections ===
1996 campaign

During 1996, Paul was re-elected to Congress after a difficult campaign. The Republican National Committee endorsed incumbent Greg Laughlin in the primary; Paul won with assistance from baseball pitcher, constituent, and friend Nolan Ryan, tax activist and publisher Steve Forbes and conservative commentator Pat Buchanan (the latter two of whom had run in the 1996 Republican Party presidential primaries). Paul narrowly defeated Democratic attorney Charles "Lefty" Morris in the fall election, despite Morris' criticism over controversial statements in several newsletters that Paul published.

1998–2013

In 1998 and 2000, Paul defeated Loy Sneary, a Democratic rice farmer from Bay City, Texas and former Matagorda County judge. In the 2008 Republican primary, he defeated Friendswood city councilman Chris Peden, with over 70 percent of the vote and ran unopposed in the general election. In the 2010 Republican primary, Paul defeated three opponents with 80 percent of the vote. On July 12, 2011, Paul announced that he would not seek re-election to the House in order to pursue the 2012 presidential election.

=== Tenure ===
Legislation

In 2009, Paul authored H.R. 2121, a bill which allowed a federal customhouse to be sold to a local historic preservation society. This bill was later signed into law.

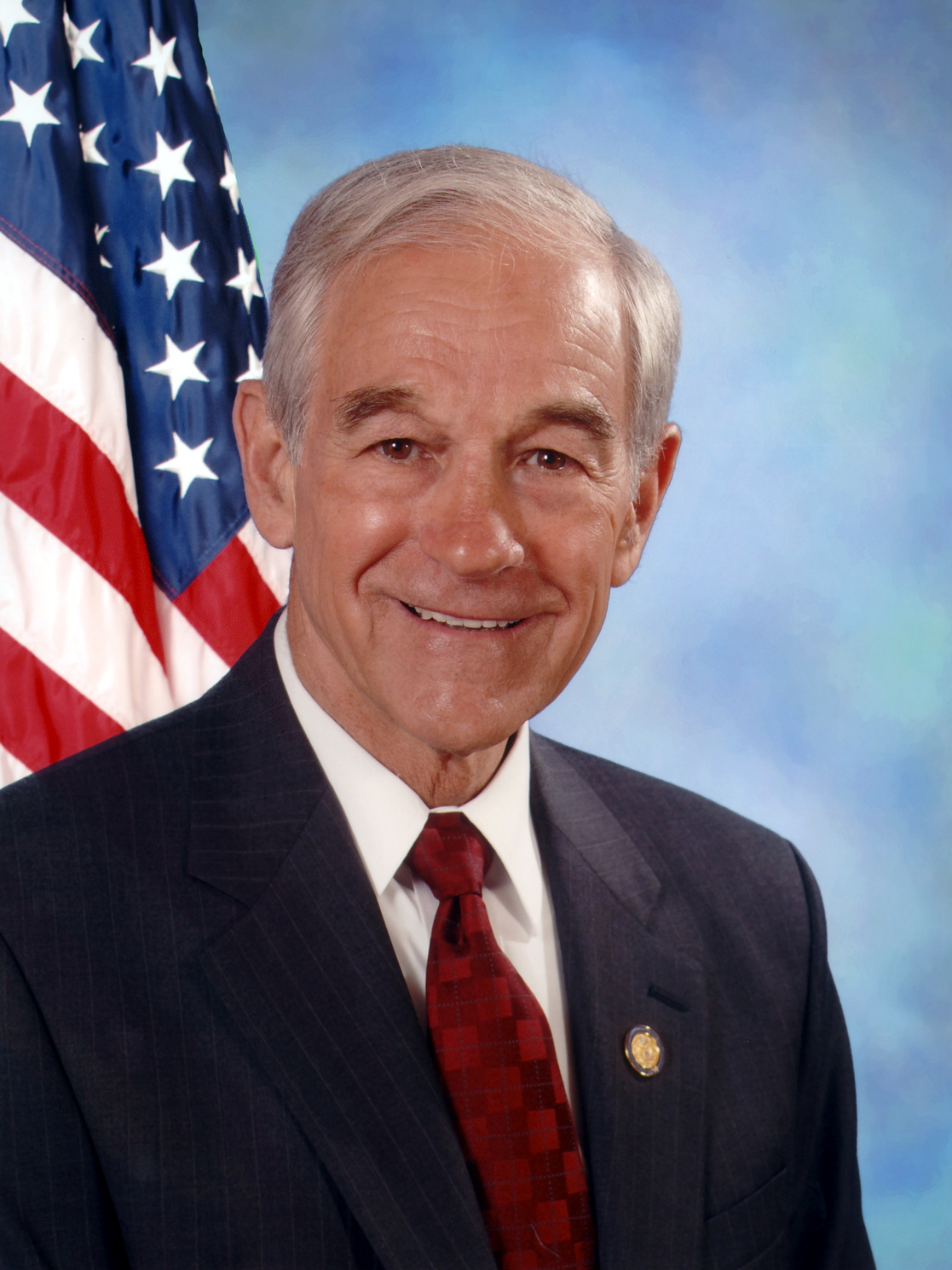
2007 congressional portrait

By amending other legislation, he helped prohibit funding for national identification numbers, funding for federal teacher certification, International Criminal Court jurisdiction over the U.S. military, American participation with any U.N. global tax, and surveillance of peaceful First Amendment activities by citizens.

In November 1997, Paul was one of eighteen Republicans in the House to co-sponsor a resolution by Bob Barr that sought to launch an impeachment inquiry against President Bill Clinton. The resolution did not specify any charges or allegations. This was an early effort to impeach Clinton, predating the eruption of the Clinton–Lewinsky scandal. The eruption of that scandal would ultimately lead to a more serious effort to impeach Clinton in 1998. On October 8, 1998, Paul voted in favor of legislation that was passed to open an impeachment inquiry. On December 19, 1998, Paul voted in favor of all four proposed articles of impeachment against Clinton (only two of which received the needed majority of votes to be adopted). Two days prior, on December 16, Paul had stated that he would vote to impeach based on Clinton's military attacks in the Middle East, namely the 1998 bombing of Iraq and Operation Infinite Reach, and not necessarily the Lewinsky scandal, which he described as far less serious than the "unconstitutionality of presidents waging wars".

In June 2005, he was the sole congressperson to vote against H.Res.199, to commemorate and condemn the Srebrenica massacre and the Bosnian genocide during the breakup of Yugoslavia.

Affiliations

Paul was honorary chairman of, and is a member of the Republican Liberty Caucus, a political action committee that describes its goal as electing "liberty-minded, limited-government individuals". He is an initiating member of the Congressional Rural Caucus, which deals with agricultural and rural issues, and the 140-member Congressional Wildlife Refuge Caucus.

=== Committee assignments ===
Paul served on the following committees and subcommittees.

- Committee on Financial Services
  - Subcommittee on Domestic Monetary Policy and Technology (chairman)
  - Subcommittee on International Monetary Policy and Trade
- Committee on Foreign Affairs
  - Subcommittee on Oversight and Investigations

With the election of the 112th Congress, and a resulting GOP majority in the House, Paul became the chairman of the Subcommittee on Domestic Monetary Policy and Technology starting in January 2011. Paul's congressional career ended on January 3, 2013, with the swearing in of the 113th Congress.

== 2008 presidential campaign ==
=== 2008 Republican primary campaign ===
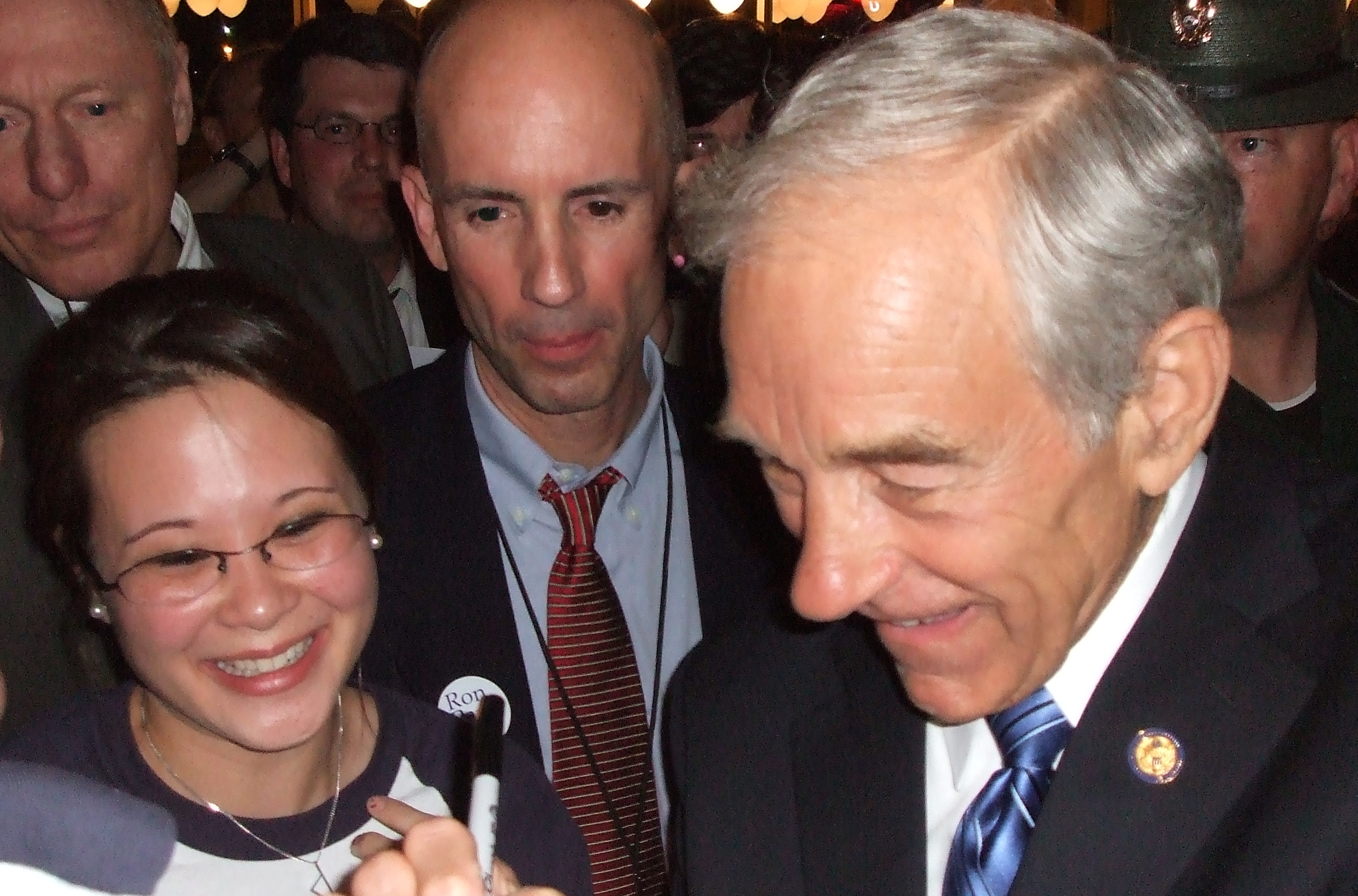
Paul campaigning for president in Manchester, New Hampshire, June 2007

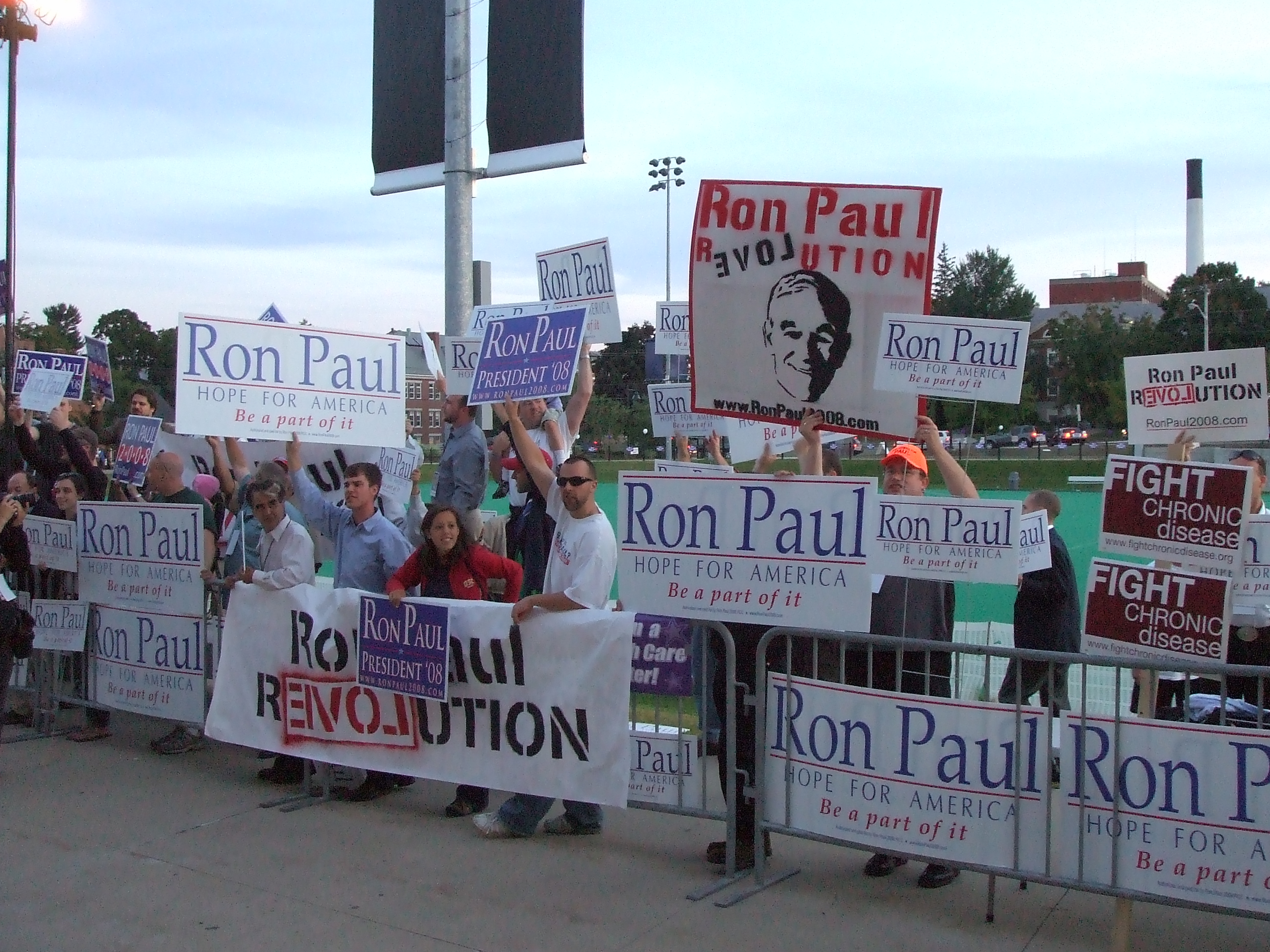
Supporters outside of the Fox News debate in September 2007

Paul formally declared his candidacy for the 2008 Republican nomination on March 12, 2007, on C-SPAN. Few major politicians endorsed him, and his campaign was largely ignored by traditional media. However, he attracted an intensely loyal grassroots following, interacting through internet social media. In May 2007, shortly after the first televised primary debates, the blogs search engine site Technorati.com listed Paul's name as the term most frequently searched for; and Paul's campaign claimed that Paul had more YouTube channel subscribers than Barack Obama or any other candidate for president. Paul fundraised more money than any other Republican candidate in the fourth quarter of 2007, as the primary season headed into the Iowa caucuses.

Despite benefiting from campaign contributions from individual donors, and the supporters determined to keep his name a frequent topic of discussion on the internet, over the course of the campaign Paul was unable to translate the enthusiasm of his core supporters into large enough numbers of actual primary votes to unseat his rivals. Paul came in 5th place in both the January 4 Iowa caucuses (10% of votes cast) and the January 8 New Hampshire primary (8%). With the exception of the Nevada caucuses January 19, where he came in 2nd (14%) behind Mitt Romney (51%), he did little better through the rest of January: Michigan 4th (6%), South Carolina 5th (4%), Florida 5th (3%). On Super Tuesday, February 5, he placed 4th in almost every state, generally taking in a mere 3–6% of the votes although he did better in the northern states of North Dakota (21%, 3rd place) and Montana (25%, 2nd place).

By March, front-runner John McCain had secured enough pledged delegates to guarantee that he would win the nomination, and Romney and Mike Huckabee had both formally withdrawn from the race. Paul, who had won no state primaries, knew that it was now impossible for him to win the nomination, as he had captured only 20—40 pledged delegates compared to more than 1,191 for McCain, yet he refused to concede the race and said that it was unlikely that he would ultimately endorse McCain. Over the next few weeks, Paul's supporters clashed with establishment Republicans at several county and state party conventions over state party rules, the party platforms, and selection of delegates for the national convention. In one instance, Nevada's state party leaders in response to Paul's supporters at the state nominating convention, resorted to prematurely shutting down the convention before selecting national delegates, with a plan to reconvene at a later date.

On June 12, 2008, Paul withdrew his bid for the Republican nomination. He later said that one of the reasons he did not run in the general election as a third-party candidate, after losing the primaries, was that, as a concession to gain ballot access in certain states, he had signed legally binding agreements to not run a third-party campaign if he lost the primary. Some of the $4 million remaining campaign contributions was invested into the political action and advocacy group called Ron Paul's Campaign for Liberty.

=== Endorsement after ending campaign ===
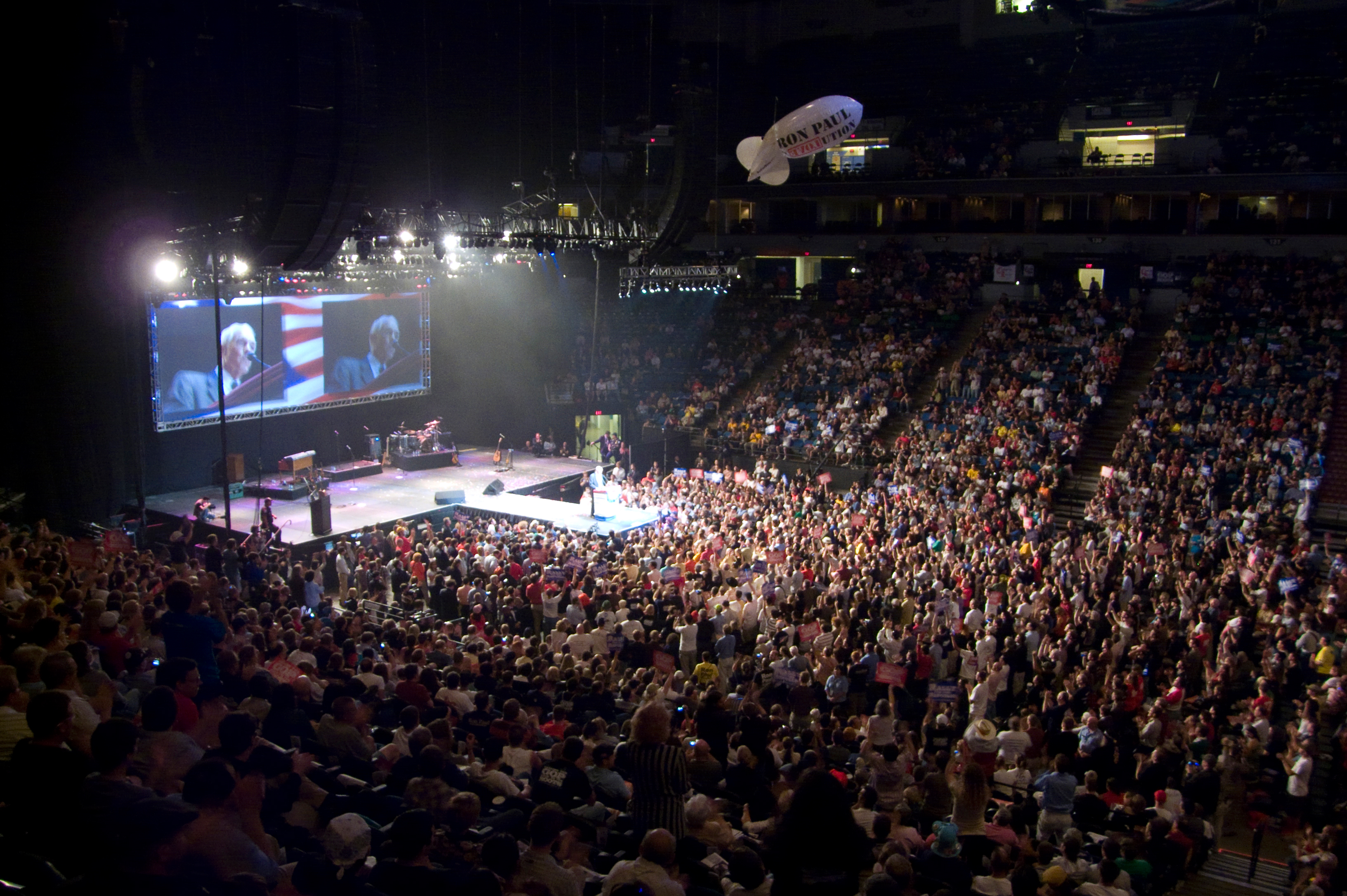
Paul's Rally for the Republic, held in Minneapolis, Minnesota on September 2, 2008

At a September 10, 2008, press conference, Paul announced his general support of four third-party candidates: Cynthia McKinney (Green Party); Bob Barr (Libertarian Party); Chuck Baldwin (Constitution Party); and Ralph Nader (independent). He said that each of them had pledged to adhere to a policy of balancing budgets, bringing the troops home, defending privacy and personal liberties, and investigating the Federal Reserve. Paul also said that under no circumstances would he be endorsing either of the two main parties' candidates (McCain—Republican Party, or Obama—Democratic Party) because there were no real differences between them, and because neither of them, if elected, would seek to make the fundamental changes in governance that were necessary. He urged instead that, rather than contribute to the "charade" that the two-party election system had become, the voters support the third-party candidates as a protest vote, to force change in the election process. Later that same day, Paul gave a televised interview with Nader saying much the same again.

Two weeks later, "shocked and disappointed" that Bob Barr (the Libertarian nominee) had pulled out of attending the press conference at the last minute and had admonished Paul for remaining neutral and failing to say which specific candidate Paul would vote for in the general election, Paul released a statement saying that he had decided to endorse Chuck Baldwin, the Constitution Party candidate, for president. Paul withdrew from active campaigning in the last weeks of the primary election period. He received 42,426 votes, or 0.03% of the total cast, in the general election.

== 2012 presidential campaign ==
=== 2012 Republican primary campaign ===
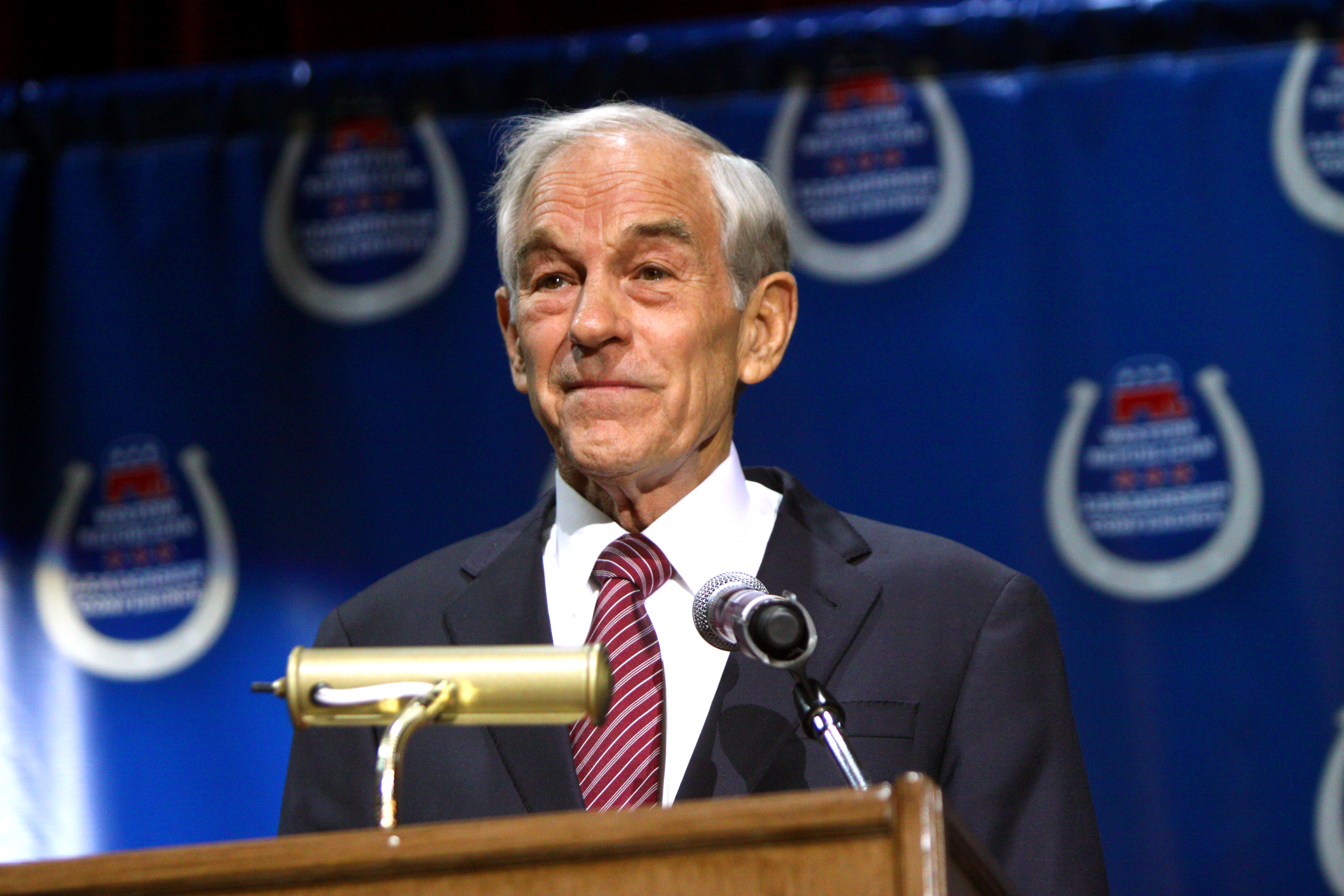
Paul speaking at the Western Republican Leadership Conference in Las Vegas, Nevada, in October 2011

Paul won several early straw polls for the 2012 Republican presidential nomination and formed an official exploratory committee in late April 2011. He participated in the first Republican presidential debate on May 5, 2011 and on May 13, 2011, formally announced his candidacy in an interview on ABC's Good Morning America. He placed second in the 2011 Ames Straw Poll, missing first by 0.9%. Paul indicated in a June 2011 interview that if nominated, he would consider former New Jersey Superior Court judge Andrew Napolitano as his running mate.

In December 2011, with Paul's increased support, the controversy over racist and homophobic statements in several Ron Paul newsletters in the 1980s and early 1990s once again gained media attention. During this time Paul supporters asserted that he was continually ignored by the media despite his significant support, citing examples where television news shows failed to mention Paul in discussions of the Republican presidential hopefuls even when he was polling second.

==== Iowa ====
Ron Paul's presidential campaign managers Jesse Benton, John Tate and Demetri Kesari were all found guilty of paying former Iowa state senator Kent Sorenson $73,000 to switch his support from Rep. Michele Bachmann to Paul. In court papers filed in August 2014, Sorenson said that he had been paid by both presidential campaigns for his endorsement and pled guilty to criminal charges stemming from the incident.

Paul came in third in the Iowa Republican Caucus held on January 3, 2012. Out of a turnout of 121,503 votes, Paul took 26,036 (21%) of the certified votes. Rick Santorum and Mitt Romney finished in a virtual tie for first place with 25% each, although Ron Paul had ultimately won Iowa at the Republican National Convention gathering 22 delegates to Mitt Romney's 5. In the New Hampshire primary held on January 10, 2012, Paul received 23% of the votes and came in second after Romney's 39%.

==== South Carolina, Florida, and Nevada ====
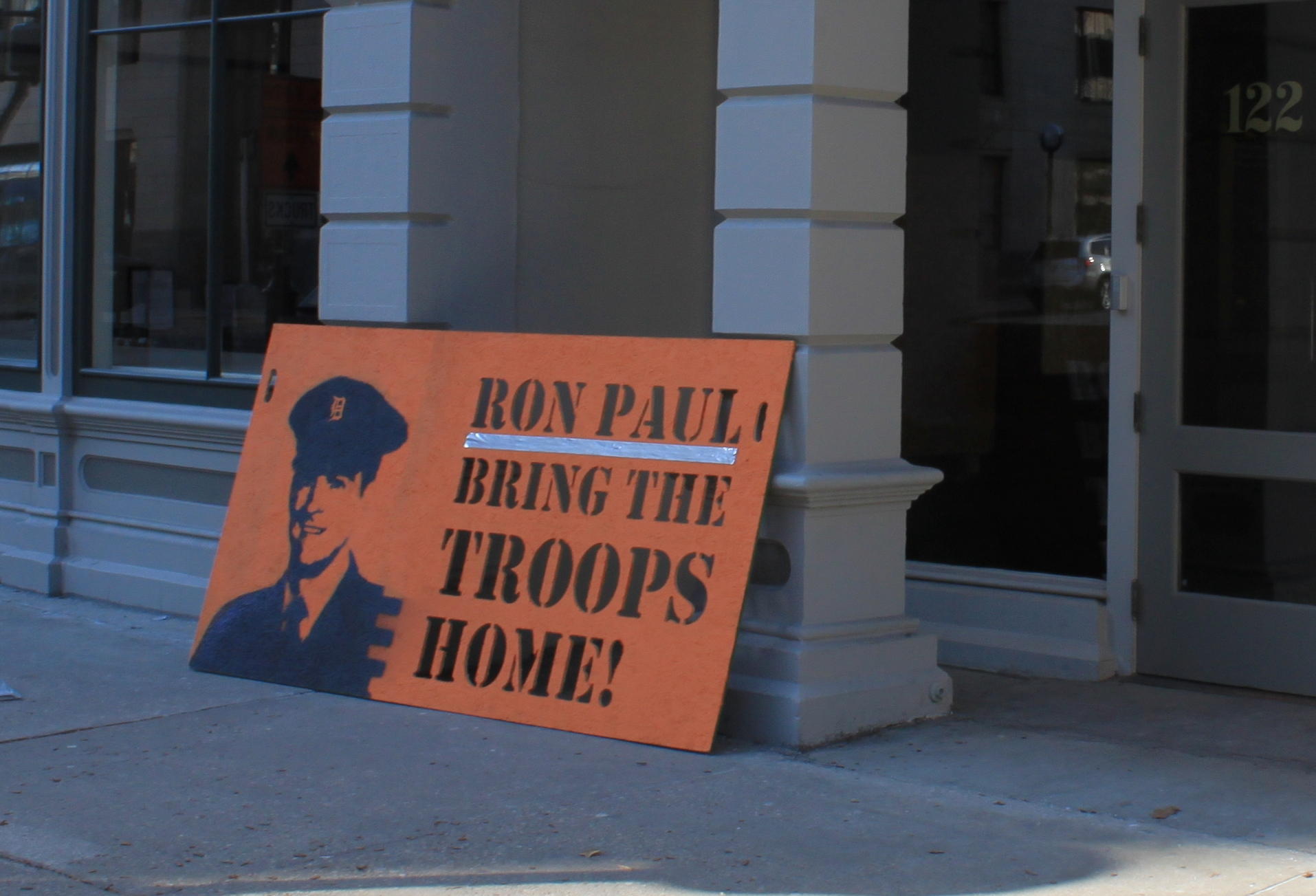
Sign in support of Paul in Ann Arbor, Michigan on the day of the 2012 Michigan primary

Paul's results then declined, despite the withdrawal of candidates Michele Bachmann, Jon Huntsman and Rick Perry. He had fourth-place finishes in the next two primaries, on January 21 in South Carolina (with 13% of the vote) and on January 31 in Florida (where he received 7% of the vote).

On February 4, Paul finished third in Nevada with 18.8% of the vote. Three non-binding primaries were held on February 7; Paul took 3rd place in Colorado and Missouri with 13% and 12% of the vote, respectively. He fared better in Minnesota with 27%, finishing second to Rick Santorum. On May 14, Paul's campaign announced that due to lack of funds (though despite financial backing from financiers Peter Thiel and Mark Spitznagel) he would no longer actively campaign for votes in the 11 remaining primary states, including Texas and California, that had not yet voted. He would, however, continue to seek to win delegates for the national party convention in the states that had already voted.

==== Alleged irregularities ====
In June, a group of 132 supporters of Paul, demanding the freedom as delegates to the upcoming Republican Party National Convention to cast votes for Paul, filed a lawsuit in U.S. District Court against the Republican National Committee and 55 state and territorial Republican party organizations for allegedly coercing delegates to choose Mitt Romney as the party's presidential nominee. The suit alleged that there had been "a systematic campaign of election fraud at state conventions", employing rigging of voting machines, ballot stuffing, and falsification of ballot totals. The suit further pointed to incidents at state conventions, including acts of violence and changes in procedural rules, allegedly intended to deny participation of Paul supporters in the party decision-making and to prevent votes from being cast for Paul. An attorney representing the complainants said that Paul campaign advisor Doug Wead had voiced support for the legal action. Paul himself told CNN that although the lawsuit was not a part of his campaign's strategy and that he had not been advising his supporters to sue, he was not going to tell his supporters not to sue, if they had a legitimate argument. He said, "If they're not following the rules, you have a right to stand up for the rules. I think for the most part these winning caucuses that we've been involved in we have followed the rules. And the other side has at times not followed the rules."

=== Republican National Convention ===
Paul declined to speak at the Republican National Convention as a matter of principle, saying that the convention planners had demanded that his remarks be vetted by the Romney campaign and that he make an unqualified endorsement of Romney. Paul had felt that "It wouldn't be my speech... That would undo everything I've done in the last 30 years. I don't fully endorse him for president." Many of Paul's supporters and delegates walked out of the convention in protest over rules adopted by the convention that reduced their delegate count and that would make it harder for non-establishment candidates to win the party's nomination in future elections. Supporters and media commentators had noted that the delegations from states where Paul had had the most support were given the worst seats in the convention hall, while delegations from regions with no electoral votes, such as the Northern Mariana Islands, American Samoa, and Puerto Rico, were given prime seats at the front.

=== Endorsement after ending campaign ===
As in 2008, Paul ultimately refused to endorse the ticket selected by the Republican Party in 2012. He said that there was no essential difference between Romney and his Democratic opponent, President Obama, on the most critical policies: "I've been in this business a long time and believe me, there is essentially no difference from one administration to another no matter what the platforms... The foreign policy stays the same, the monetary policy stays the same, there's no proposal for any real cuts and both parties support it." Paul received 26,204 write-in votes, or 0.02% of the total cast in the election.

== Political party identification ==
Throughout his entire tenure in Congress, Paul has represented his district as a member of the Republican Party; however, he has frequently taken positions in direct opposition to the other members and the leadership of the party, and he has sometimes publicly questioned whether he really belonged in the party. Paul voted for Dwight D. Eisenhower for president in 1956 when he was 21 years old. He had been a lifelong supporter of the Republican Party by the time he entered politics in the mid-1970s. He was one of the first elected officials in the nation to support Ronald Reagan's presidential campaign, and he actively campaigned for Reagan in 1976 and 1980. After Reagan's election in 1980, Paul quickly became disillusioned with the Reagan administration's policies. He later recalled being the only Republican to vote against Reagan budget proposals in 1981, aghast that "in 1977, Jimmy Carter proposed a budget with a $38 billion deficit, and every Republican in the House voted against it. In 1981, Reagan proposed a budget with a $45 billion deficit—which turned out to be $113 billion—and Republicans were cheering his great victory. They were living in a storybook land." He expressed his disgust with the political culture of both major parties in a speech delivered in 1984 upon resigning from the House of Representatives to prepare for a (failed) run for the Senate, and he eventually apologized to his libertarian friends for having supported Reagan.

By 1987, Paul was ready to sever all ties to the Republican Party, as he explained in his resignation letter: "Since [1981] Ronald Reagan and the Republican Party have given us skyrocketing deficits, and astoundingly a doubled national debt. How is it that the party of balanced budgets, with control of the White House and Senate, accumulated red ink greater than all previous administrations put together? ... There is no credibility left for the Republican Party as a force to reduce the size of government. That is the message of the Reagan years." A month later, he announced he would seek the 1988 Libertarian Party nomination for president. During the 1988 campaign, Paul called Reagan "a dramatic failure" and complained that "Reagan's record is disgraceful. He starts wars, breaks the law, supplies terrorists with guns made at taxpayers' expense and lies about it to the American people." Paul predicted that "the Republicans are on their way out as a major party," and he said that, although registered as a Republican, he had always been a libertarian at heart.

Paul returned to his private medical practice and managing several business ventures after losing the 1988 election; but by 1996, he was ready to return to politics, this time running on the Republican Party ticket again. He said that he had never read the entire Libertarian platform when he ran for president on that ticket in 1988, and that "I worked for the Libertarians on my terms, not theirs." He added that in terms of a political label he preferred to call himself "a constitutionalist. In Congress I took an oath to uphold the Constitution, not the (Republican) platform." When he lost the Republican Party presidential primary election in 2008, Paul criticized the two major political parties, saying that there was no real difference between the parties and that neither of them truly intended to challenge the status quo. He refused to endorse the Republican Party's nominee for president, John McCain, and lent his support to third-party candidates instead.

In the 2012 presidential campaign, during which he acknowledged it was unlikely that he would win the Republican Party nomination, Paul again asserted that he was participating in the Republican Party on his own terms, trying to persuade the rest of the party to move toward his positions rather than joining in with theirs. He expressed doubt that he would support any of his rivals should they win the nomination, warning that, "If the policies of the Republican Party are the same as the Democrat Party and they don't want to change anything on foreign policy, they don't want to cut anything, they don't want to audit the Fed and find out about monetary policy, they don't want to have actual change in government, that is a problem for me." On that same theme he said in another interview, "I would be reluctant to jump on board and tell all of the supporters that have given me trust and money that all of a sudden, I'd say, [all] we've done is for naught. So, let's support anybody at all ... even if they disagree with everything that we do."

== Political positions ==
Paul has been described as conservative and libertarian. According to University of Georgia political scientist Keith Poole, Paul had the most conservative voting record of any member of Congress from 1937 to 2002, and is the most conservative of the candidates that had sought the 2012 Republican nomination for president. Other analyses have judged Paul much more moderate. The National Journal, for instance, rated Paul only the 145th-most-conservative member of the House of Representatives (out of 435) based on votes cast in 2010. The National Journal's analysis gave Paul a 2011 composite ideological rating of 54% liberal and 46% conservative.

The foundation of Paul's political philosophy is the conviction that "the proper role for government in America is to provide national defense, a court system for civil disputes, a criminal justice system for acts of force and fraud, and little else." He has been nicknamed "Dr. No", reflecting both his medical degree and his insistence that he will "never vote for legislation unless the proposed measure is expressly authorized by the Constitution." In 2008, Paul spoke at the John Birch Society's 50th-anniversary celebration.

=== Foreign policy ===
An anti-war activist, Paul promotes a noninterventionist foreign policy and an end to American imperialism. He advocates withdrawal from the United Nations and from the North Atlantic Treaty Organization, for reasons of maintaining strong national sovereignty.

Paul voted for the Authorization for Use of Military Force Against Terrorists in response to the September 11 attacks, but suggested war alternatives such as authorizing the president to grant Letters of Marque and Reprisal targeting specific terrorists, in lieu of launching an Afghanistan invasion. An opponent of the Iraq War and potential war with Iran, he has criticized neoconservatism and U.S. foreign policy in the Middle East, arguing that both inadvertently cause terrorist reprisals against Americans, such as the 9/11 attacks. Paul has stated that "Israel is our close friend" and that it is not the place of the United States to "dictate how Israel runs her affairs". Paul, a critic of the US's implementation of most foreign aid, said in 2011 that "it was our foreign aid that helped Mubarak retain power to repress his people in the first place."

Following the Orange Revolution protests in 2004, which led to Viktor Yanukovych's ouster from government, Paul accused the National Endowment for Democracy of having staged a coup in Ukraine. Paul supported the 2014 Crimean status referendum, for which he was called a friend of Vladimir Putin by The Atlantic, and has objected to sanctions during the Russo-Ukrainian War and foreign aid to Ukraine.

=== Domestic issues ===
Paul endorses constitutional rights, such as the right to keep and bear arms, and habeas corpus for political detainees. He was one of only three Republicans in the House to vote against the Patriot Act. Paul opposes federal use of torture, presidential autonomy, a national identification card, warrantless domestic surveillance, and the draft. He has also called for shutting down the TSA and moving matters of airline security to private businesses. Paul believes that the notion of the separation of church and state is currently misused by the court system: "In case after case, the Supreme Court has used the infamous 'separation of church and state' metaphor to uphold court decisions that allow the federal government to intrude upon and deprive citizens of their religious liberty." After the April 2013 Boston Marathon bombing, Paul commented on the tactics used by governing forces into a harsh criticism that he has written as a "military-style occupation of an American city".

=== Economic issues ===
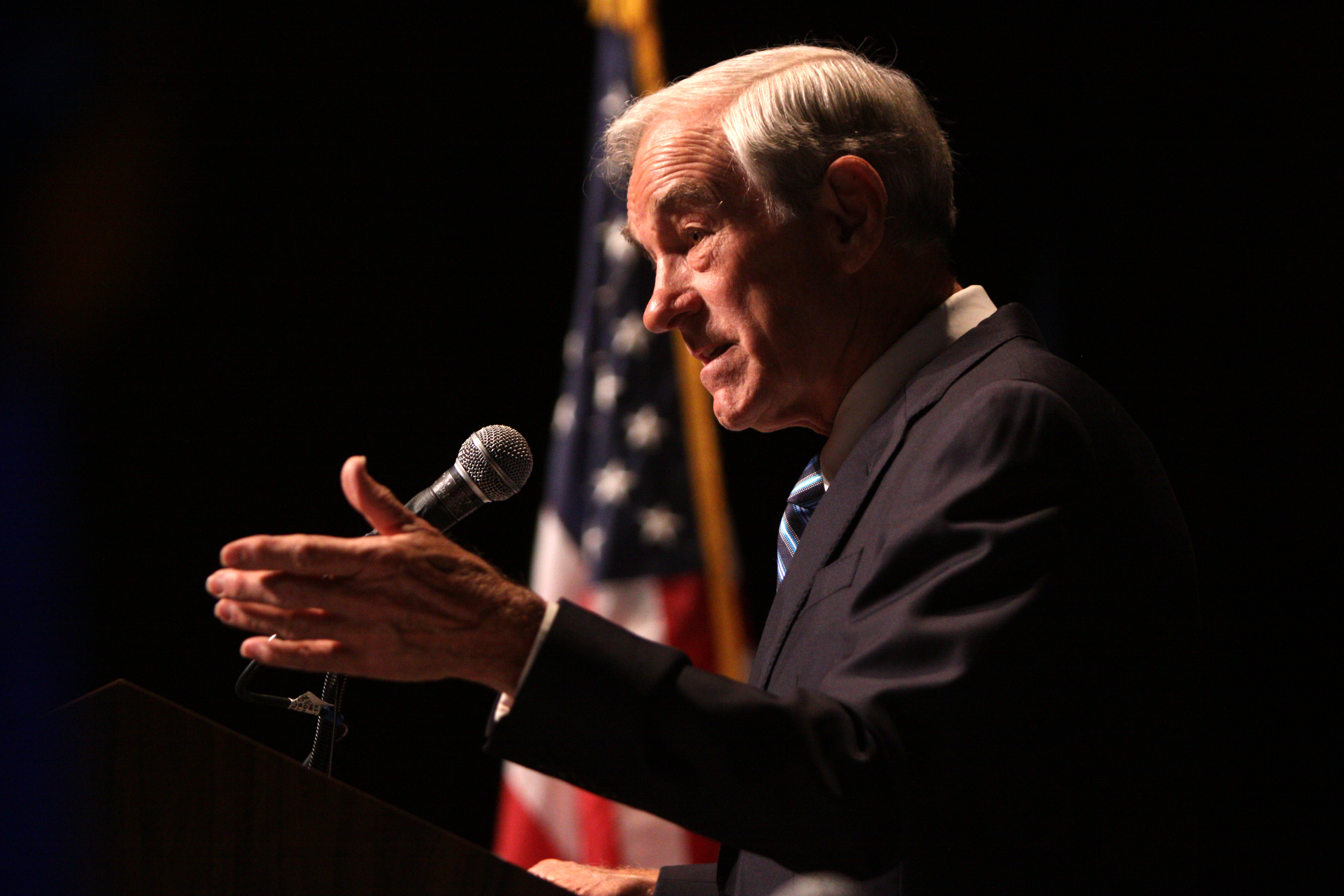
Paul speaking at the 2011 Liberty Political Action Conference (LPAC)

Paul is a proponent of Austrian School economics; he has authored six books on the subject, and displayed pictures of Austrian School economists Friedrich Hayek, Murray Rothbard, and Ludwig von Mises (as well as of President Grover Cleveland and Chicago School economist Milton Friedman) on his office wall. He regularly voted against almost all proposals for new government spending, initiatives, or taxes; he cast two thirds of all the lone negative votes in the House during a 1995–1997 period.

Paul pledged never to raise taxes, and states he has never voted to approve a budget deficit. Paul believes that the country could abolish the individual income tax by scaling back federal spending to its fiscal year 2000 levels; with government operations being primarily financed through excise taxes and non-protectionist tariffs. He endorses eliminating most federal government agencies, terming them unnecessary bureaucracies. On April 15, 2011, Paul was one of four Republican members of Congress to vote against Representative Paul Ryan's budget proposal, known as "The Path to Prosperity".

Paul has consistently warned of hyperinflation and called for a return to the gold standard as far back as 1981. From 1999 until his retirement, he introduced bills into each Congress seeking to eliminate the Federal Reserve System in a single year, a position he outlines in his 2009 book End the Fed. Paul is a strong proponent of free trade, once saying that "free trade is an answer to a lot of conflicts around the world". He rejects membership in the North American Free Trade Agreement (NAFTA) and the World Trade Organization as "managed trade". He has also advocated for open trade and better relations with the country of Cuba. In addition, Paul argued in 2012 that "as well intentioned as sanctions are, they almost always backfire and hurt the people."

Paul has described his interest in ending wars and lowering military spending as partly an "economic issue", adding, "We'd save a lot of money by not being engaged [in overseas conflict] like this."

=== Climate change ===
As a free-market environmentalist, Paul asserts private property rights in relation to environmental protection and pollution prevention. Polluters would be prosecuted under tort law as pollution would be violating other's property. In a 2009 Fox Business interview he said climate change is not a "major problem threatening civilization", stating "I think war and financial crises and big governments marching into our homes and elimination of habeas corpus – those are immediate threats. We're about to lose our whole country and whole republic!".

=== Healthcare ===
Paul has stated, "The government shouldn't be in the medical business." He pushes to eliminate federal involvement with and management of health care, which he argues would allow prices to decrease due to the fundamental dynamics of a free market. He also opposes federal government influenza inoculation programs.

=== Immigration ===
Paul endorses increased border security and opposes welfare for illegal immigrants, birthright citizenship, and amnesty; he voted for the Secure Fence Act of 2006. In a 2019 interview, Paul expressed disapproval of President Donald Trump's proposed border wall along the southern US border, saying, "I don't like walls. I don't want to wall people in and wall people out."

=== Ballots and voting ===
Paul is an outspoken proponent of increased ballot access for third-party candidates. He has sought to repeal the National Voter Registration Act of 1993, also known as the Motor Voter law.

=== Secession ===
Paul has stated that secession from the United States "is a deeply American principle" and that "If the possibility of secession is completely off the table there is nothing to stop the federal government from continuing to encroach on our liberties and no recourse for those who are sick and tired of it." Paul wrote the remarks in a post on his Congressional website in one of his final public statements as a member of Congress, noting that many petitions had been submitted to the White House calling for secession in the wake of the November 2012 election.

=== Social issues ===
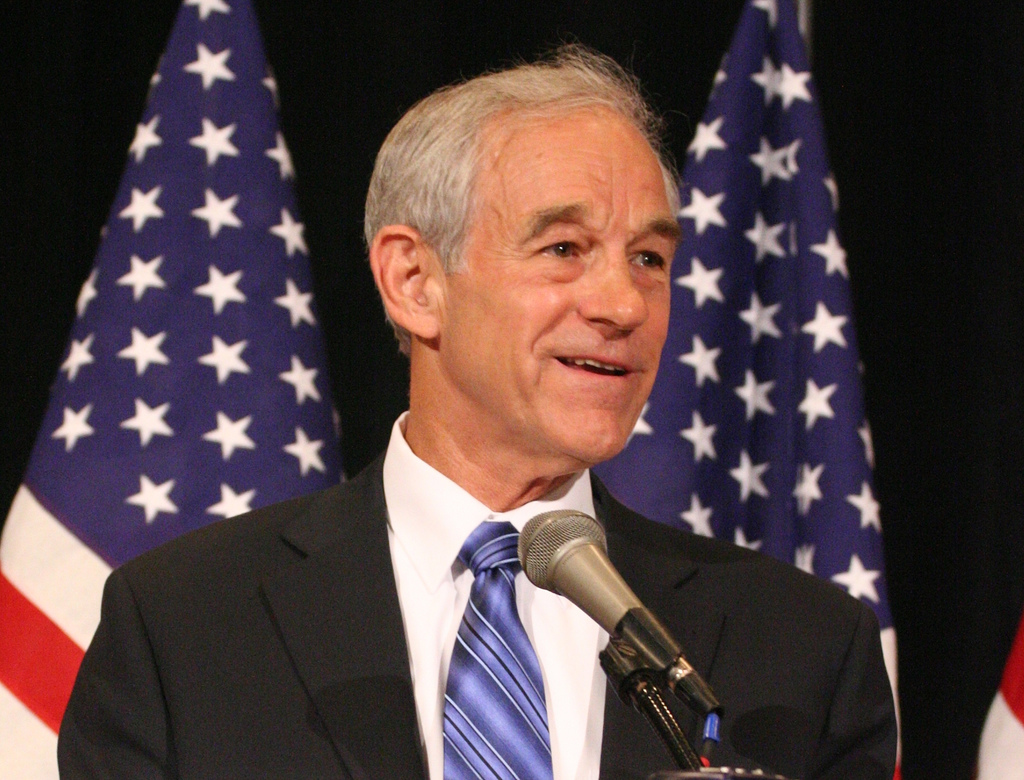
Paul at the 2007 National Right to Life Committee Convention

Citing the Ninth and Tenth Amendments, Paul advocates states' rights to decide how to regulate social matters not cited directly by the Constitution. He opposes federal regulation of such matters as the death penalty (although he opposes capital punishment), of education, of drugs, and of marriage. Regarding same-sex marriage, he stated in 2011 that "My personal opinion is government shouldn't be involved. The whole country would be better off if individuals made those decisions and it was a private matter." He endorsed revising the military's "don't ask, don't tell" policy to concern mainly disruptive sexual behavior (whether heterosexual or homosexual). His abortion-related legislation, such as the Sanctity of Life Act in 2005, is intended to negate Roe v. Wade and to get "the federal government completely out of the business of regulating state matters." Paul says his years as an obstetrician led him to believe that life begins at conception.

Paul was critical of the Civil Rights Act of 1964, arguing that it sanctioned federal interference in the labor market and did not improve race relations. He once remarked: "The Civil Rights Act of 1964 not only violated the Constitution and reduced individual liberty; it also failed to achieve its stated goals of promoting racial harmony and a color-blind society". Paul opposes affirmative action.

Paul opposes the federal war on drugs, and advocates that states should decide whether to regulate or deregulate drugs such as medical and recreational marijuana, and other substances. In 2001, he joined with Democratic Congressman Barney Frank in helping pass the States' Rights to Medical Marijuana Act (H.R. 2592), an attempt to stop the federal government from preempting states' medical marijuana laws. Paul again partnered with Frank in support of online gambling rights. In 2006, both strongly opposed H.R. 4777, the Internet Gambling Prohibition and Enforcement Act, and H.R. 4411, the Goodlatte-Leach Internet Gambling Prohibition Act.

In June 2018, Paul posted a tweet containing a racist cartoon and a caption which invoked the Cultural Marxism conspiracy theory. The tweet read "Are you stunned by what has become of American culture? Well, it's not an accident. You've probably heard of 'Cultural Marxism,' but do you know what it means?" The tweet was later deleted with an apology, stating that a staff member had inadvertently posted what Paul described as an "offensive cartoon".

== Post-congressional career ==
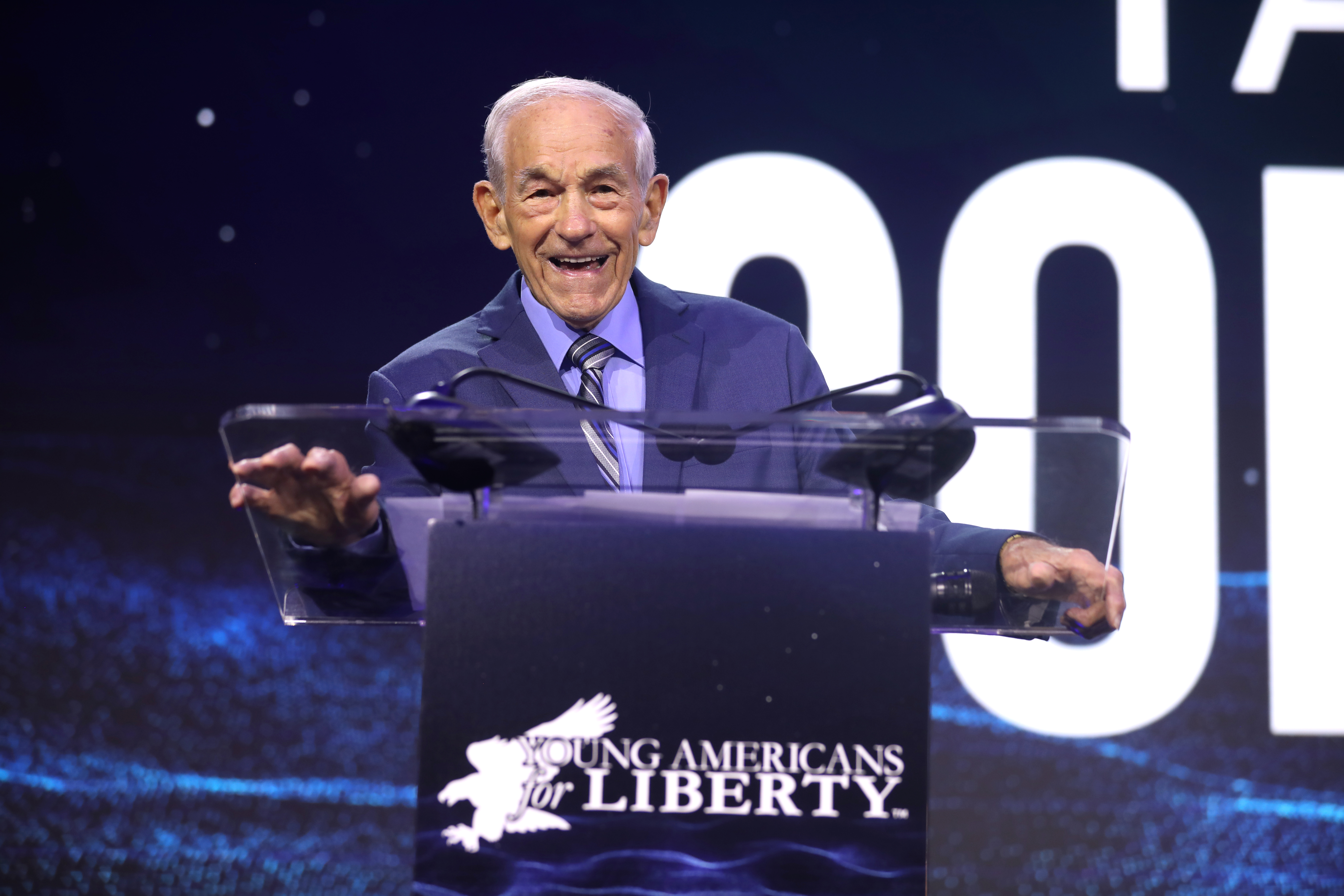
Paul speaking at a 2024 conference hosted by the Young Americans for Liberty student activism organization

In April 2013, Paul founded the Ron Paul Institute for Peace and Prosperity, a foreign policy think tank that seeks to promote his non-interventionist views. The institute is part of his larger foundation Foundation for Rational Economics and Education. In the same month, he began to offer the Ron Paul Curriculum, a homeschool online curriculum developed by Gary North and taught from a "free market and Christian" perspective.

In June 2013, Paul criticized the NSA surveillance program and praised Edward Snowden for having performed a "great service to the American people by exposing the truth about what our government is doing in secret". In April 2015, Paul began appearing in infomercials for Stansberry & Associates Investment Research, warning about an upcoming financial meltdown as a result of the imminent crash of the world's currencies. In March 2017, Paul predicted a market downturn again.

Paul was a critic of President Trump's plans to increase the number of military personnel in Afghanistan. In August 2017, he said that Americans do not see Afghanistan as a threat to their personal security and being aggressive in foreign policy only loses Trump some of his support base. Paul has also called for Trump to bring American troops back from Syria in April 2018, on the grounds that the threat from ISIS has been eliminated. He continues to voice his disagreements regarding foreign policy, and more recently, regarding the events involving America and Iran.

In 2013, Paul established the Ron Paul Channel, an Internet broadcast. Its slogan was "Turn Off Your TV. Turn On the Truth". In 2015, Paul ended all relationships with the Ron Paul Channel in order to start a new Internet program, which he co-hosts with Daniel McAdams, called The Ron Paul Liberty Report.

=== 2016 presidential election ===
Paul endorsed his son, Senator Rand Paul, in the 2016 Republican primary and campaigned for him in Iowa. After his son dropped out, Paul said that no Republican or Democratic candidate even came close to holding libertarian views. Paul expressed disappointment in former New Mexico governor Gary Johnson's Libertarian Party nomination for president, and told independent voters that Green Party nominee Jill Stein was a better candidate for those who "lean towards progressivism and liberalism", while emphasizing that he was not endorsing her.

Paul received one electoral vote from a Texas faithless elector, South Texas College political science professor William Greene (who had been pledged to Donald Trump), in the 2016 presidential election, making Paul the oldest person ever to receive an electoral vote, and the second Libertarian Party member to receive an electoral vote, after John Hospers in 1972.

=== 2020 presidential election ===
In the 2020 Democratic primary, Paul described Hawaii representative Tulsi Gabbard as "the most intelligent" and "the very, very best" option of the Democratic candidates, primarily for her views on foreign policy, adding, "We probably wouldn't agree with too much on economics."

=== 2024 presidential election ===
In April 2023, in an episode of The Ron Paul Liberty Report titled "President Kennedy?", Paul praised then-Democratic (later Independent) presidential candidate Robert F. Kennedy Jr. for his stances on noninterventionism, the pharmaceutical industry, and crony corporatism, saying "[Kennedy's] baggage is telling the truth" and advocated for his participation in the major party presidential debates.

A few days before the election, Elon Musk expressed interest in having Paul join the proposed Department of Government Efficiency during a second Trump presidency, which Musk has suggested could help cut the U.S. federal budget by up to US$2 trillion. Paul responded that he was happy to discuss the idea with Musk, although declined any "official position" within the new department.

== Personal life ==
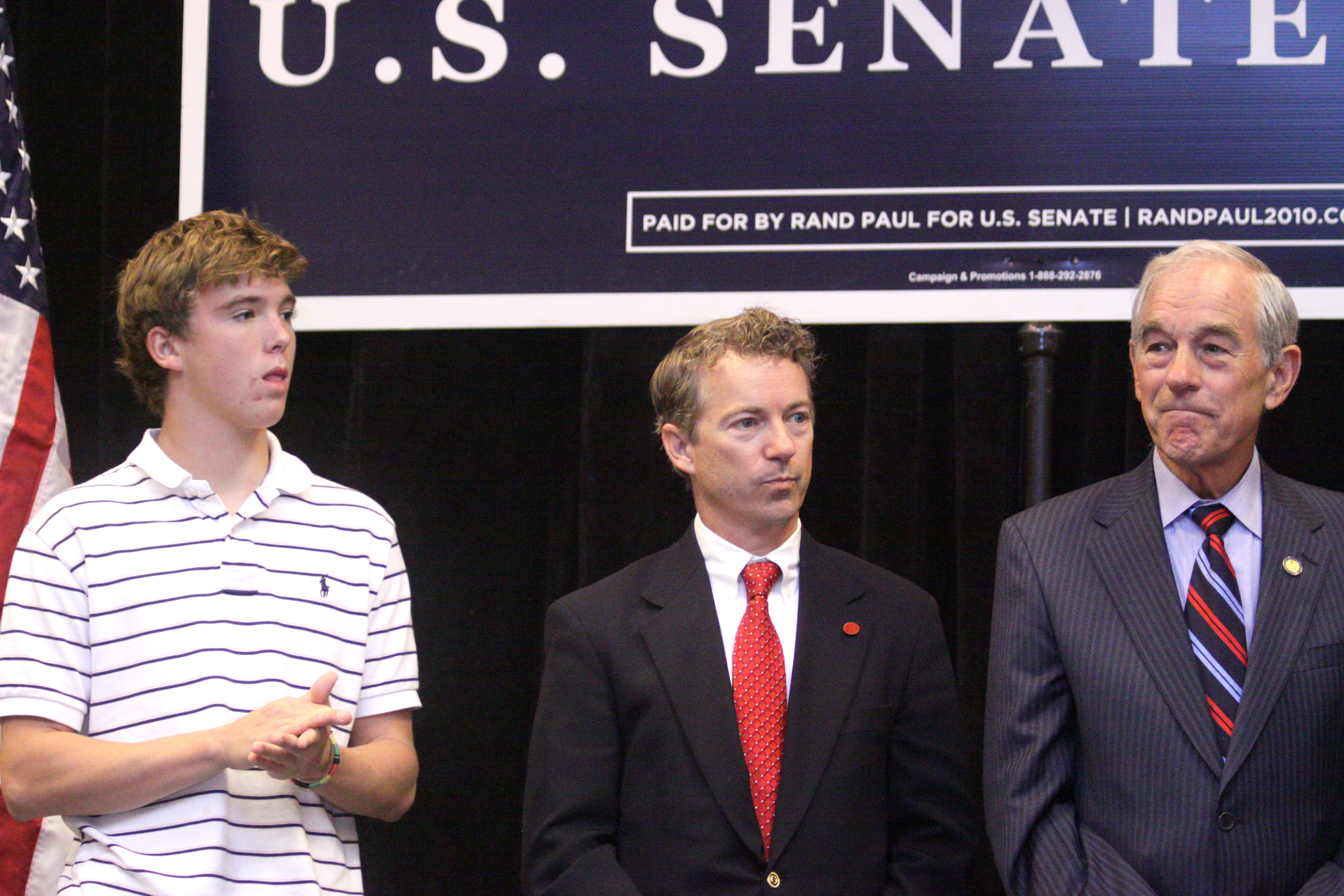
Paul at a rally in Erlanger, Kentucky, in October 2010, along with his son, senatorial candidate Rand Paul of Kentucky, and his grandson, William Paul (pictured from right to left)

Paul has been married to Carol (Carolyn) Wells since 1957. They met in 1952 when Wells asked Paul to be her escort to her 16th birthday party. They have five children, who were baptized Episcopalian: Ronald, Lori, Randal, Robert, and Joy. Paul's son Randal (Rand) is the junior United States senator from the state of Kentucky. Raised a Lutheran, Paul later became a Baptist. Since 1995, Carol Paul has published the Ron Paul Family Cookbook, a collection of recipes she and her friends contributed, and which was sold in part to support Ron Paul's political campaigns. His life and career are the subject of the 2012 film Ron Paul Uprising. Paul and his wife reside in Lake Jackson, Texas.

On September 25, 2020, Paul was hospitalized after slurring his words while speaking during a livestream event. Paul later posted a photo of himself in a hospital bed to his Twitter page, along with the statement "I am doing fine. Thank you for your concern." In April 2021, following Paul's absence from his daily show, the Ron Paul Liberty Report, his co-host Daniel McAdams revealed Paul's daughter, Lori Pyeatt, had recently died.

== Media relating to Ron Paul ==
=== Books ===
- Ron Paul: Father of the Tea Party, by Jason Rink, 2011
- Ron Paul's rEVOLution: The Man and the Movement He Inspired, by Brian Doherty, 2012

=== Films ===
- The Housing Bubble, a 2018 documentary starring Ron Paul, and featuring numerous archival clips of his predictions over the years.
- America: Freedom to Fascism, 2006 film featuring an interview from Paul.
- American Drug War: The Last White Hope, 2007 documentary in which Paul has a cameo appearance.
- I.O.U.S.A., 2008 documentary featuring Paul among the cast.
- Brüno, 2009 film by Sacha Baron Cohen in which Paul has a cameo appearance.
- An Inconvenient Tax, 2010 documentary featuring Paul among the cast.
- Ron Paul Uprising, 2012 film by William Lewis, about Paul and his campaign for the presidency.
- Atlas Shrugged Part III: Who Is John Galt?, 2014 adaptation of Atlas Shrugged in which Paul has a cameo appearance.

== Bibliography ==
- Paul, Ron (1981). Gold, Peace, and Prosperity: The Birth of a New Currency (PDF). Lake Jackson, TX: Foundation for Rational Economics and Education. ISBN 978-9110412804. OCLC 7877384.
- Paul, Ron; Lehrman, Lewis; U.S. Gold Commission (September 1982). The Case for Gold: A Minority Report of the U.S. Gold Commission (PDF). Washington, DC: Cato Institute (2d ed. Ludwig von Mises Institute, 2007). ISBN 978-0932790316. OCLC 8763972.
- Paul, Ron (1983). Abortion and Liberty. Lake Jackson, TX: Foundation for Rational Economics and Education. ISBN 978-0912453026. OCLC 9682249.
- Paul, Ron (1983). Ten Myths About Paper Money: And One Myth About Paper Gold. Lake Jackson, TX: Foundation for Rational Economics and Education. OCLC 11765863.
- Paul, Ron (1984). Mises and Austrian Economics: A Personal View (PDF). Auburn, AL: Ludwig von Mises Institute (2d ed. 2004). OCLC 19968524.
- Paul, Ron (1987). Freedom Under Siege: The U.S. Constitution After 200 Years. Lake Jackson, TX: Foundation for Rational Economics and Education (2d ed. Ludwig von Mises Institute, 2007). ISBN 978-1610164443. OCLC 19697005.
- Paul, Ron (1990). Challenge to Liberty: Coming to Grips with the Abortion Issue. Lake Jackson, TX: Ron Paul Enterprises. OCLC 46960450.
- Paul, Ron (1991). The Ron Paul Money Book: The Monetary Writings of Congressman Ron Paul. Plantation Publishing.
- Paul, Ron (2000). A Republic, If You Can Keep It. Lake Jackson, TX: Foundation for Rational Economics and Education. OCLC 45414993. Archived from the original on September 4, 2011.
- Paul, Ron (2002). The Case for Defending America. Lake Jackson, TX: Foundation for Rational Economics and Education. OCLC 49744552.
- Paul, Ron (2002). The Ron Paul – Liberty In Media Awards–2001. Jersey City, NJ: Palisade Business Press. ISBN 978-1893958845.
- Paul, Ron (2003). The Ron Paul – Liberty In Media Awards – Vol. 2–2002. Jersey City, NJ: Palisade Business Press.
- Paul, Ron (2004). The Ron Paul – Liberty In Media Awards – Vol. 3–2003. Jersey City, NJ: Palisade Business Press. ISBN 978-1893958241.
- Upton, Fred; Paul, Ron (2005). Indecency in the Media: Rating and Restricting Entertainment Content: Should the House Pass H.R. 3717, the Broadcast Decency Enforcement Act?. Washington, DC: Congressional Digest Corp. OCLC 81150568.
- Rangel, Charles B.; Paul, Ron (2006). Compulsory National Service: 2006–2007 Policy Debate Topic: Should the All-Volunteer Force be Replaced by Universal, Mandatory National Service?. Bethesda, MD: Congressional Digest Corp. OCLC 84912971.
- Paul, Ron (2007). A Foreign Policy of Freedom: Peace, Commerce, and Honest Friendship. Lake Jackson, TX: Foundation for Rational Economics and Education. ISBN 978-0912453002. OCLC 145174995.
- Paul, Ron (2008). Pillars of Prosperity. Auburn, AL: Ludwig von Mises Institute. ISBN 978-1933550244.
- Paul, Ron; Haddad, Philip; Marsh, Roger (2008). Ron Paul Speaks. Guilford, CN: Lyons Press. ISBN 978-1599214481. OCLC 199459258.
- Paul, Ron (2008). The Revolution: A Manifesto. New York: Grand Central Publishing. ISBN 978-0446537513. OCLC 191881970.
- Paul, Ron (2009). End the Fed. New York: Grand Central Publishing. ISBN 978-0446549196. OCLC 318878539.
- Paul, Ron (2011). Liberty Defined: 50 Essential Issues That Affect Our Freedom. New York: Grand Central Publishing. ISBN 978-1455501458.
- Paul, Ron (2013). The School Revolution: A New Answer for Our Broken Education System. New York: Grand Central Publishing. ISBN 978-1455577170. OCLC 828057047.
- Paul, Ron (2015). Swords Into Plowshares: A Life in Wartime and a Future of Peace and Prosperity. Ron Paul Institute for Peace and Prosperity. ISBN 978-0996426503.
- Paul, Ron (2017). The Revolution at Ten Years. Ron Paul Institute for Peace and Prosperity. ISBN 978-0996426558.

=== Other contributions ===
- Belloc, Hilaire; Chesterton, Cecil (2007) [1911]. The Party System. Paul, Ron (foreword). Norfolk, VA: IHS Press. ISBN 978-1932528114. OCLC 173299105.
- Fortman, Erik; Lavello, Randy (2004). Webs Of Power: Government Agencies, Secret Societies, & Elite Legacies. Paul, Ron (interview). Austin, Texas: Van Cleave Publishing. ISBN 978-0975967003. OCLC 61026033.
- Haugen, David M.; Musser, Susan (2007). Human Embryo Experimentation. Paul, Ron (Chapter 9: No form of stem cell research should be federally funded). Detroit, MI: Greenhaven Press. ISBN 978-0737732436. OCLC 84152907.
- Haugen, David M., ed. (2007). National Security. Paul, Ron (Chapter 1–7: The federal debt is a threat to national security). Detroit, MI: Greenhaven Press. ISBN 978-0737737615. OCLC 144227284.
- Archived at Ghostarchive and the Wayback Machine: Jaeger, James; Baehr, Theodore; Griffin, G. Edward; Paul, Ron; Vieira, Edwin (2007). Fiat Empire: Why the Federal Reserve Violates the U.S. Constitution (DVD). Beverly Hills, CA: Cornerstone-Matrixx Entertainment. OCLC 192133806.
- Minns, Michael Louis (2001). How to Survive the IRS. Paul, Ron (foreword). Fort Lee, NJ: Barricade Books. ISBN 978-1569801703. OCLC 44860846.
- Paul, Ron; Hayashi, Terry; Pardo, Victoriano & Fisher, Edwin (August 1, 1969). "Evaluation of Renal Biopsy in Pregnancy Toxemia". Obstetrics and Gynecology. 34 (2). American College of Obstetricians and Gynecologists: 235–241. PMID 5798269.
- Paul, Ron (1999). "Being Pro-Life is Necessary to Defend Liberty". International Journal of Sociology and Social Policy. 19 (3–4). MCB University Press, Ltd: 11. doi:10.1108/01443339910788712. ISSN 0144-333X. OCLC 89482648 – via Emerald Group Publishing.
- Paul, Ron; Bartlett, Roscoe et al. (2001). The United Nations & the New World Order (Videotape). Brunswick, OH: American Portrait Films, Inc. ISBN 978-1573411325. OCLC 56793278.
- Pearl, Sandy; Beutel, Bill; Alis, Bob; Weingold, Dave; Paul, Ron; Bartsch, Ed (1980). Born Again (Videotape). Athens, GA: University of Georgia Instructional Resources Center. OCLC 7407395.
- Skousen, Mark; Weber, Chris; Ketcher, Michael (1987). The Closing Door: The End of Financial Privacy in America and How to Protect Yourself. Paul, Ron (introduction). Bethel, CN: Institute for the Preservation of Wealth (worldcat.org/oclc/35396237 2d ed. 1988). ISBN 978-0938689034. OCLC 17209571.
- Vieira, Edwin Jr. (1983). Pieces of Eight. Paul, Ron (foreword). Fort Lee, NJ: Sound Dollar Committee. ISBN 978-0815962267. OCLC 9919612.
- von NotHaus, Bernard, ed. (September 1, 2003). The Liberty Dollar Solution to the Federal Reserve. Paul, Ron (Chapter 21: Abolish the Fed). Evansville, IN: American Financial Press. ISBN 978-0967102528.

== See also ==
- Criticism of the Federal Reserve
- Draft Ron Paul movement
- Libertarian Republican
- List of federal political scandals in the United States
- List of peace activists
- List of politicians affiliated with the Tea Party movement
- Paulville, Texas
- Students for Ron Paul

U.S. House of Representatives
Preceded by Bob Casey	Member of the U.S. House of Representatives from Texas's 22nd congressional district 1976–1977	Succeeded by Bob Gammage
Preceded by Bob Gammage	Member of the U.S. House of Representatives from Texas's 22nd congressional district 1979–1985	Succeeded by Tom DeLay
Preceded by Greg Laughlin	Member of the U.S. House of Representatives from Texas's 17th congressional district 1997–2013	Succeeded by Randy Weber
Party political offices
Preceded by David Bergland	Libertarian nominee for President of the United States; 1988	Succeeded by Andre Marrou
U.S. order of precedence (ceremonial)
Preceded by John Mica as former U.S. Representative	Order of precedence of the United States as former U.S. Representative	Followed by Michael C. Burgess as former U.S. Representative
