= 1992 United States presidential election in Washington (state) =

- November 3, 1992
- Turnout: 82.60% ▲5.66%

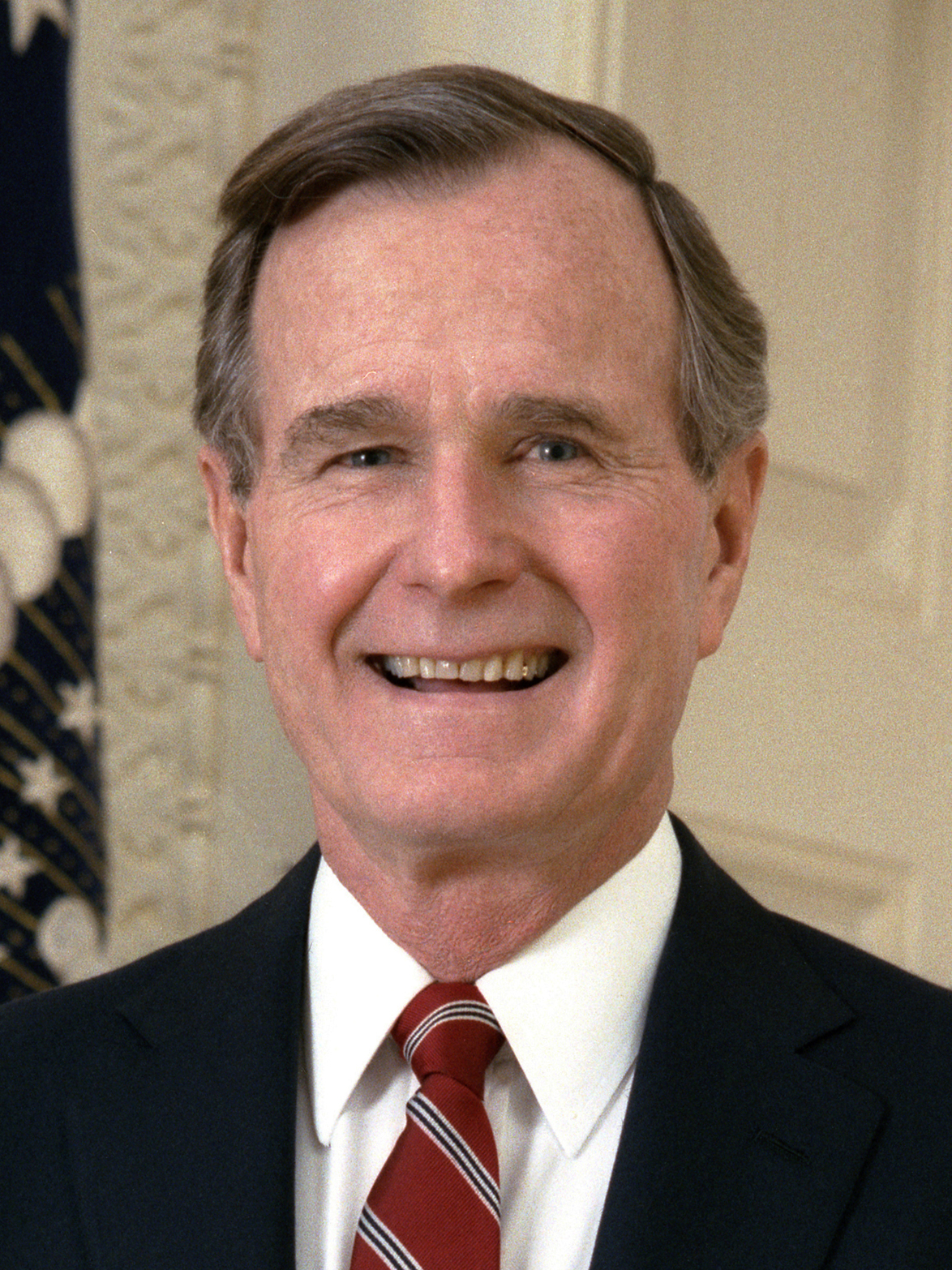

Nominee	Bill Clinton	George H. W. Bush	Ross Perot
Party	Democratic	Republican	Independent
Home state	Arkansas	Texas	Texas
Running mate	Al Gore	Dan Quayle	James Stockdale
Electoral vote	11	0	0
Popular vote	993,037	731,234	541,780
Percentage	43.41%	31.97%	23.68%
County results
Clinton
30–40%
40–50%
50–60%
Bush
30–40%
40–50%
President before election
George H. W. Bush
Republican
Elected President
Bill Clinton
Democratic

The 1992 United States presidential election in Washington took place on November 3, 1992, as part of the 1992 United States presidential election. Voters chose 11 representatives, or electors to the Electoral College, who voted for president and vice president.

Washington was won by Governor Bill Clinton (D-Arkansas) with 43.41% of the popular vote over incumbent President George H. W. Bush (R–Texas) with 31.97%. Businessman Ross Perot (I-Texas) finished in third, with 23.68% of the popular vote. Clinton ultimately won the national vote, defeating incumbent President Bush.

As of the 2024 presidential election, this is the last election in which Okanogan County has voted for a Democratic presidential nominee. It was also the first occasion since Franklin D. Roosevelt’s 1936 landslide that Whitman County had supported a Democratic presidential candidate, as well as the first time that King County was the most Democratic in the state, a trend that has continued in every presidential election since.

== Results ==
1992 United States presidential election in Washington
Party	Candidate	Votes	%	±%
Democratic	Bill Clinton Al Gore	993,037	43.41%	−6.64%
Republican	George H. W. Bush Dan Quayle	731,234	31.97%	−16.49%
Independent	Ross Perot James Stockdale	541,780	23.68%	N/A
Libertarian	Andre Marrou Nancy Lord	7,533	0.33%	−0.59%
Populist	James "Bo" Gritz Cyril Minett	4,854	0.21%	N/A
Natural Law	John Hagelin Mike Tompkins	2,456	0.11%	N/A
Constitution	Howard Phillips Albion W. Knight Jr.	2,354	0.10%	N/A
New Alliance	Lenora Fulani Maria Elizabeth Muñoz	1,776	0.08%	−0.11%
Independent	Ronald Daniels Asiba Tupahache	1,171	0.05%	N/A
U.S. Labor	Lyndon LaRouche James Bevel	855	0.04%	−0.20%
Socialist Workers	James Warren Estelle DeBates	515	0.02%	−0.05%
Total votes		2,287,565	100.00%	N/A

=== By county ===
County	Bill Clinton Democratic		George H. W. Bush Republican		Ross Perot Independent		Other candidates Various parties		Margin		Total votes cast
County	#	%	#	%	#	%	#	%	#	%	Total votes cast
Adams	1,449	31.60%	2,087	45.52%	1,010	22.03%	39	0.85%	-638	-13.91%	4,585
Asotin	3,239	42.64%	2,425	31.92%	1,849	24.34%	83	1.09%	814	10.72%	7,596
Benton	16,459	31.29%	22,883	43.50%	12,878	24.48%	382	0.73%	-6,424	-12.21%	52,602
Chelan	7,860	33.48%	10,716	45.65%	4,606	19.62%	294	1.25%	-2,856	-12.17%	23,476
Clallam	10,820	37.74%	9,765	34.06%	7,775	27.12%	313	1.09%	1,055	3.68%	28,673
Clark	42,648	40.03%	36,906	34.64%	26,163	24.56%	819	0.77%	5,742	5.39%	106,536
Columbia	668	34.90%	761	39.76%	466	24.35%	19	0.99%	-93	-4.86%	1,914
Cowlitz	15,052	43.59%	10,000	28.96%	9,246	26.78%	231	0.67%	5,052	14.63%	34,529
Douglas	3,731	33.77%	4,920	44.53%	2,315	20.95%	82	0.74%	-1,189	-10.76%	11,048
Ferry	963	37.66%	773	30.23%	762	29.80%	59	2.31%	190	7.43%	2,557
Franklin	3,743	34.22%	4,486	41.02%	2,597	23.75%	111	1.01%	-743	-6.79%	10,937
Garfield	473	35.81%	620	46.93%	222	16.81%	6	0.45%	-147	-11.13%	1,321
Grant	7,278	33.20%	9,503	43.35%	4,898	22.34%	242	1.10%	-2,225	-10.15%	21,921
Grays Harbor	12,599	46.26%	6,904	25.35%	7,460	27.39%	275	1.01%	5,139 (Note: In this county where Perot ran second ahead of Bush, margin given is Clinton vote minus Perot vote and percentage margin Clinton percent minus Perot percent.)	18.87%	27,238
Island	9,555	35.17%	9,526	35.06%	7,889	29.04%	198	0.73%	29	0.11%	27,168
Jefferson	6,148	47.50%	3,467	26.79%	3,168	24.48%	159	1.23%	2,681	20.72%	12,942
King	391,050	50.23%	212,986	27.36%	167,216	21.48%	7,341	0.94%	178,064	22.87%	778,593
Kitsap	34,442	38.89%	29,340	33.13%	23,873	26.95%	913	1.03%	5,102	5.76%	88,568
Kittitas	5,432	43.86%	4,078	32.93%	2,778	22.43%	97	0.78%	1,354	10.93%	12,385
Klickitat	2,758	40.27%	2,085	30.44%	1,938	28.30%	68	0.99%	673	9.83%	6,849
Lewis	7,810	28.75%	12,316	45.33%	6,684	24.60%	358	1.32%	-4,506	-16.59%	27,168
Lincoln	1,653	33.48%	2,152	43.59%	1,098	22.24%	34	0.69%	-499	-10.11%	4,937
Mason	8,076	41.15%	5,776	29.43%	5,577	28.42%	197	1.00%	2,300	11.72%	19,626
Okanogan	5,015	38.48%	4,265	32.72%	3,541	27.17%	212	1.63%	750	5.75%	13,033
Pacific	4,587	49.58%	2,243	24.24%	2,351	25.41%	71	0.77%	2,236	24.17%	9,252
Pend Oreille	1,798	38.13%	1,528	32.40%	1,340	28.41%	50	1.06%	270	5.73%	4,716
Pierce	102,243	42.40%	77,410	32.10%	59,523	24.68%	1,973	0.82%	24,833	10.30%	241,149
San Juan	3,353	47.11%	1,901	26.71%	1,776	24.95%	87	1.22%	1,452	20.40%	7,117
Skagit	15,936	39.13%	13,388	32.87%	10,973	26.94%	431	1.06%	2,548	6.26%	40,728
Skamania	1,474	40.05%	1,102	29.95%	1,050	28.53%	54	1.47%	372	10.11%	3,680
Snohomish	88,643	39.32%	69,137	30.67%	65,838	29.21%	1,812	0.80%	19,506	8.65%	225,430
Spokane	69,526	41.11%	59,984	35.47%	38,251	22.62%	1,371	0.81%	9,542	5.64%	169,132
Stevens	4,960	33.54%	5,706	38.59%	3,769	25.49%	352	2.38%	-746	-5.04%	14,787
Thurston	38,293	45.28%	25,643	30.32%	19,551	23.12%	1,082	1.28%	12,650	14.96%	84,569
Wahkiakum	696	38.75%	488	27.17%	584	32.52%	28	1.56%	112	6.24%	1,796
Walla Walla	7,325	36.84%	7,894	39.71%	4,507	22.67%	155	0.78%	-569	-2.86%	19,881
Whatcom	26,619	41.80%	23,801	37.38%	12,455	19.56%	804	1.26%	2,818	4.43%	63,679
Whitman	7,637	43.69%	6,428	36.78%	3,220	18.42%	193	1.10%	1,209	6.92%	17,478
Yakima	21,026	36.27%	25,841	44.58%	10,583	18.26%	519	0.90%	-4,815	-8.31%	57,969
Totals	993,037	43.41%	731,234	31.97%	541,780	23.68%	21,514	0.94%	261,803	11.44%	2,287,565

==== Counties that flipped from Republican to Democratic ====
- Clallam
- Island
- Kitsap
- Okanogan
- Skagit
- Snohomish
- Spokane
- Whitman

==== Counties that flipped from Tied to Democratic ====
- Ferry

County Flips: Democratic Hold Flip / Republican Hold

== See also ==
- United States presidential elections in Washington (state)
- Presidency of Bill Clinton
