= Albion Knight =

Albion Knight may refer to:

- Albion W. Knight Jr. (1924–2012), archbishop of the United Episcopal Church
- Albion W. Knight (1859–1936), bishop in the Episcopal Church
- Albion Knight (play), a play published circa 1566
