= Jonathan McGovern =

Jonathan McGovern may refer to:

- Jonathan McGovern (singer), baritone singer
- Jonathan McGovern (historian), English historian and author
