= 1988 United States presidential election in California =

- November 8, 1988
- Turnout: 72.81% (of registered voters) ▼2.12 pp 53.51% (of eligible voters) ▼5.57 pp

| Nominee | George H. W. Bush | Michael Dukakis |
| Party | Republican | Democratic |
| Home state | Texas | Massachusetts |
| Running mate | Dan Quayle | Lloyd Bentsen |
| Electoral vote | 47 | 0 |
| Popular vote | 5,054,914 | 4,702,233 |
| Percentage | 51.12% | 47.56% |

Bush
40–50%
50–60%
60–70%
70–80%
Dukakis
50–60%
60–70%
70–80%
80–90%
President before election
Ronald Reagan
Republican
Elected President
George H. W. Bush
Republican

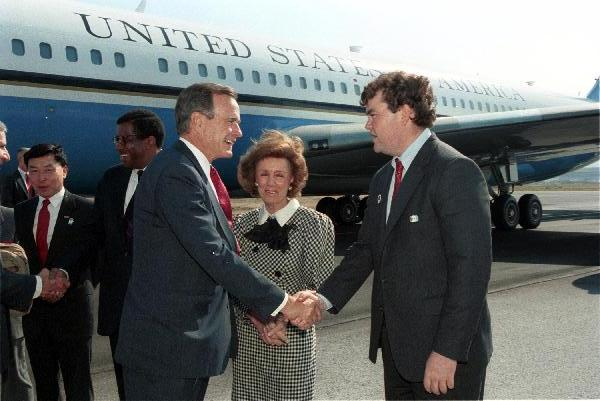
Bush campaigning in San Francisco on September 14, 1988

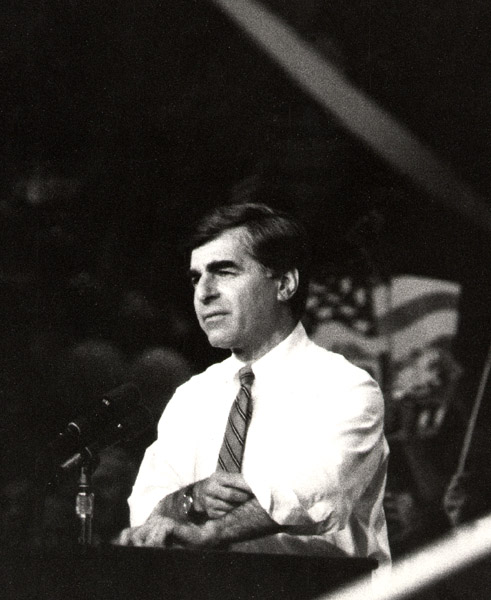
Dukakis holds an election eve rally at the Pauley Pavilion

The 1988 United States presidential election in California took place on November 8, 1988, and was part of the 1988 United States presidential election. Voters chose 47 representatives, or electors to the Electoral College, who voted for president and vice president.

California voted for the Republican nominee, Vice President George H. W. Bush, over the Democratic nominee, Massachusetts governor Michael Dukakis by a margin of 3.57 percent. Bush won forty-four of the state's fifty-eight counties, but the election was kept close by Dukakis’ strong performance in the Bay Area and his victory in Los Angeles, the state's most populated county. Also, Dukakis won at least 31% of the vote in every county and at least 40 percent in forty of them. Much like Vermont in the same year, California was seen by observers as a swing state in this year's presidential election cycle due to fairly close polling.

California weighed in for this election as 4.2% more Democratic than the nation at large. As of the 2024 presidential election, this is the last presidential race where California voted Republican. From the next election onwards, California would, like fellow West Coast states Oregon and Washington, transition from being swing states to voting consistently for Democratic candidates, forming a "blue wall" of sorts over the next three decades. Oregon and Washington even voted for Dukakis in the election, making this the only presidential election since 1948 that Oregon and California voted for different candidates, as well as the last presidential election where California voted to the right of both Oregon and Washington. Bush is also the last Republican to carry the following counties in a presidential election: Monterey, Napa, Sacramento, San Benito, and Santa Barbara. Additionally, he is the last Republican to win any county in the Bay Area (Napa), the last Republican to secure at least one-quarter of the vote in San Francisco, the last Republican to win a majority of votes in Imperial County, and the last Republican to secure at least 40% of the vote in Los Angeles County.

Bush became the first Republican to win the White House without carrying Sonoma County, a Republican stronghold for most of the 20th century, since Benjamin Harrison in 1888, as well as the first to do so without carrying Los Angeles County, a bellwether county from 1920 to 1984, since Rutherford Hayes in 1876. Due to Bush's victory in California, this was also the most recent presidential election when the state of Texas would not be the biggest electoral vote prize won by the Republican candidate, and likewise for the Democratic nominee in regards to California, which instead was New York.

== General election ==
=== Predictions ===
| Source | Rating | As of |
|---|---|---|
| The Cook Political Report | Toss Up | September 24, 1988 |

=== Results ===
1988 United States presidential election in California
| Party | Candidate | Votes | Percentage | Electoral votes |
|---|---|---|---|---|
| Republican | George Herbert Walker Bush | 5,054,917 | 51.13% | 47 |
| Democratic | Michael Stanley Dukakis | 4,702,233 | 47.56% | 0 |
| Libertarian | Ron Paul | 70,105 | 0.71% | 0 |
| Independent | Lenora Fulani | 31,180 | 0.32% | 0 |
| American Independent | James C. Griffin | 27,818 | 0.28% | 0 |
| No party | David Duke (write-in) | 483 | 0.00% | 0 |
| No party | Eugene McCarthy (write-in) | 234 | 0.00% | 0 |
| No party | Herbert G. Lewin (write-in) | 58 | 0.00% | 0 |
| No party | Write-in | 25 | 0.00% | 0 |
| No party | Larry Holmes (write-in) | 11 | 0.00% | 0 |
| Invalid or blank votes | | | | — |
| Totals | | 9,887,064 | 100.00% | 47 |
| Voter turnout | | | | — |

=== By county ===
| County | George H.W. Bush Republican | | Michael Dukakis Democratic | | Various candidates Other parties | | Margin | | Total votes cast |
| County | # | % | # | % | # | % | # | % | Total votes cast |
|---|---|---|---|---|---|---|---|---|---|
| Alameda | 162,815 | 33.99% | 310,283 | 64.78% | 5,899 | 1.23% | -147,468 | -30.79% | 478,997 |
| Alpine | 306 | 55.43% | 230 | 41.67% | 16 | 2.90% | 76 | 13.76% | 552 |
| Amador | 6,893 | 55.87% | 5,197 | 42.12% | 248 | 2.01% | 1,696 | 13.75% | 12,338 |
| Butte | 40,143 | 56.04% | 30,406 | 42.45% | 1,082 | 1.51% | 9,737 | 13.59% | 71,631 |
| Calaveras | 7,640 | 56.28% | 5,674 | 41.80% | 260 | 1.92% | 1,966 | 14.48% | 13,574 |
| Colusa | 3,077 | 59.49% | 2,022 | 39.10% | 73 | 1.41% | 1,055 | 20.39% | 5,172 |
| Contra Costa | 158,652 | 47.86% | 169,411 | 51.10% | 3,448 | 1.04% | -10,759 | -3.24% | 331,511 |
| Del Norte | 3,714 | 49.73% | 3,587 | 48.03% | 167 | 2.24% | 127 | 1.70% | 7,468 |
| El Dorado | 30,021 | 59.33% | 19,801 | 39.13% | 781 | 1.54% | 10,220 | 20.20% | 50,603 |
| Fresno | 94,835 | 49.95% | 92,635 | 48.79% | 2,400 | 1.26% | 2,200 | 1.16% | 189,870 |
| Glenn | 4,944 | 62.06% | 2,894 | 36.33% | 128 | 1.61% | 2,050 | 25.73% | 7,966 |
| Humboldt | 21,460 | 41.15% | 29,781 | 57.11% | 905 | 1.74% | -8,321 | -15.96% | 52,146 |
| Imperial | 12,889 | 55.16% | 10,243 | 43.84% | 233 | 1.00% | 2,646 | 11.32% | 23,365 |
| Inyo | 5,042 | 64.34% | 2,653 | 33.85% | 142 | 1.81% | 2,389 | 30.49% | 7,837 |
| Kern | 90,550 | 61.48% | 55,083 | 37.40% | 1,660 | 1.12% | 35,467 | 24.08% | 147,293 |
| Kings | 12,118 | 56.41% | 9,142 | 42.56% | 222 | 1.03% | 2,976 | 13.85% | 21,482 |
| Lake | 9,366 | 48.03% | 9,828 | 50.39% | 308 | 1.58% | -462 | -2.36% | 19,502 |
| Lassen | 5,157 | 58.59% | 3,446 | 39.15% | 199 | 2.26% | 1,711 | 19.44% | 8,802 |
| Los Angeles | 1,239,716 | 46.88% | 1,372,352 | 51.89% | 32,603 | 1.23% | -132,636 | -5.01% | 2,644,671 |
| Madera | 13,255 | 54.59% | 10,642 | 43.83% | 384 | 1.58% | 2,613 | 10.76% | 24,281 |
| Marin | 46,855 | 39.73% | 69,394 | 58.85% | 1,671 | 1.42% | -22,539 | -19.12% | 117,920 |
| Mariposa | 3,768 | 54.53% | 2,998 | 43.39% | 144 | 2.08% | 770 | 11.14% | 6,910 |
| Mendocino | 12,979 | 41.94% | 17,152 | 55.42% | 816 | 2.64% | -4,173 | -13.48% | 30,947 |
| Merced | 21,717 | 51.20% | 20,105 | 47.40% | 592 | 1.40% | 1,612 | 3.80% | 42,414 |
| Modoc | 2,518 | 62.68% | 1,416 | 35.25% | 83 | 2.07% | 1,102 | 27.43% | 4,017 |
| Mono | 2,177 | 61.38% | 1,284 | 36.20% | 86 | 2.42% | 893 | 25.18% | 3,547 |
| Monterey | 50,022 | 49.83% | 48,998 | 48.81% | 1,361 | 1.36% | 1,024 | 1.02% | 100,381 |
| Napa | 23,235 | 50.19% | 22,283 | 48.14% | 772 | 1.67% | 952 | 2.05% | 46,290 |
| Nevada | 21,383 | 57.76% | 14,980 | 40.46% | 660 | 1.78% | 6,403 | 17.30% | 37,023 |
| Orange | 586,230 | 67.75% | 269,013 | 31.09% | 10,064 | 1.16% | 317,217 | 36.66% | 865,307 |
| Placer | 42,096 | 59.59% | 27,516 | 38.95% | 1,030 | 1.46% | 14,580 | 20.64% | 70,642 |
| Plumas | 4,603 | 51.06% | 4,251 | 47.15% | 161 | 1.79% | 352 | 3.91% | 9,015 |
| Riverside | 199,979 | 59.46% | 133,122 | 39.58% | 3,247 | 0.96% | 66,857 | 19.88% | 336,348 |
| Sacramento | 201,832 | 51.01% | 188,557 | 47.65% | 5,301 | 1.34% | 13,275 | 3.36% | 395,690 |
| San Benito | 5,578 | 54.11% | 4,559 | 44.23% | 171 | 1.66% | 1,019 | 9.88% | 10,308 |
| San Bernardino | 235,167 | 59.99% | 151,118 | 38.55% | 5,723 | 1.46% | 84,049 | 21.44% | 392,008 |
| San Diego | 523,143 | 60.19% | 333,264 | 38.34% | 12,788 | 1.47% | 189,879 | 21.85% | 869,195 |
| San Francisco | 72,503 | 26.14% | 201,887 | 72.78% | 3,004 | 1.08% | -129,384 | -46.64% | 277,394 |
| San Joaquin | 75,309 | 54.39% | 61,699 | 44.56% | 1,445 | 1.05% | 13,610 | 9.83% | 138,453 |
| San Luis Obispo | 46,613 | 55.85% | 35,667 | 42.73% | 1,187 | 1.42% | 10,946 | 13.12% | 83,467 |
| San Mateo | 109,261 | 42.94% | 141,859 | 55.74% | 3,360 | 1.32% | -32,598 | -12.80% | 254,480 |
| Santa Barbara | 77,524 | 54.24% | 63,586 | 44.48% | 1,830 | 1.28% | 13,938 | 9.76% | 142,940 |
| Santa Clara | 254,442 | 46.99% | 277,810 | 51.30% | 9,276 | 1.71% | -23,368 | -4.31% | 541,528 |
| Santa Cruz | 37,728 | 36.77% | 63,133 | 61.53% | 1,750 | 1.70% | -25,405 | -24.76% | 102,611 |
| Shasta | 32,402 | 59.36% | 21,171 | 38.79% | 1,012 | 1.85% | 11,231 | 20.57% | 54,585 |
| Sierra | 860 | 50.71% | 791 | 46.64% | 45 | 2.65% | 69 | 4.07% | 1,696 |
| Siskiyou | 9,056 | 50.88% | 8,365 | 47.00% | 376 | 2.12% | 691 | 3.88% | 17,797 |
| Solano | 50,314 | 47.43% | 54,344 | 51.23% | 1,430 | 1.34% | -4,030 | -3.80% | 106,088 |
| Sonoma | 67,725 | 41.91% | 91,262 | 56.48% | 2,596 | 1.61% | -23,537 | -14.57% | 161,583 |
| Stanislaus | 51,648 | 53.07% | 44,685 | 45.92% | 982 | 1.01% | 6,963 | 7.15% | 97,315 |
| Sutter | 14,100 | 67.47% | 6,557 | 31.09% | 241 | 1.14% | 7,543 | 36.38% | 20,898 |
| Tehama | 9,854 | 56.52% | 7,213 | 41.37% | 367 | 2.11% | 2,641 | 15.15% | 17,434 |
| Trinity | 3,267 | 54.63% | 2,518 | 42.11% | 195 | 3.26% | 749 | 12.52% | 5,980 |
| Tulare | 46,891 | 59.61% | 30,711 | 39.04% | 1,067 | 1.35% | 16,180 | 20.57% | 78,669 |
| Tuolumne | 10,646 | 54.00% | 8,717 | 44.22% | 352 | 1.78% | 1,929 | 9.78% | 19,715 |
| Ventura | 147,604 | 61.64% | 89,065 | 37.19% | 2,804 | 1.17% | 58,539 | 24.45% | 239,473 |
| Yolo | 22,358 | 41.89% | 30,429 | 57.01% | 585 | 1.10% | -8,071 | -15.12% | 53,372 |
| Yuba | 8,937 | 61.37% | 5,444 | 37.38% | 182 | 1.25% | 3,493 | 23.99% | 14,563 |
| Total | 5,054,917 | 51.13% | 4,702,233 | 47.56% | 129,914 | 1.31% | 352,684 | 3.57% | 9,887,064 |

==== Counties that flipped from Republican to Democratic ====
- Humboldt
- Sonoma
- Mendocino
- San Mateo
- Los Angeles
- Santa Clara
- Solano
- Contra Costa
- Lake

=== Results by city ===
Official outcome by city and unincorporated areas of counties, of which Bush won 323, Dukakis won 180, and 1 tied.
| City | County | George Bush Republican | | Michael Dukakis Democratic | | Various candidates Other parties | | Margin | | Total Votes | 1984 to 1988 Swing % |
| City | County | # | % | # | % | # | % | # | % | Total Votes | 1984 to 1988 Swing % |
|---|---|---|---|---|---|---|---|---|---|---|---|
| Alameda | Alameda | 11,630 | 42.14% | 15,643 | 56.68% | 328 | 1.19% | -4,013 | -14.54% | 27,601 | -18.96% |
| Albany | Alameda | 1,643 | 21.02% | 6,084 | 77.85% | 88 | 1.13% | -4,441 | -56.83% | 7,815 | -16.62% |
| Berkeley | Alameda | 7,505 | 13.13% | 48,992 | 85.69% | 678 | 1.19% | -41,487 | -72.56% | 57,175 | -6.47% |
| Dublin | Alameda | 4,187 | 55.44% | 3,248 | 43.01% | 117 | 1.55% | 939 | 12.43% | 7,552 | -16.54% |
| Emeryville | Alameda | 607 | 25.74% | 1,717 | 72.82% | 34 | 1.44% | -1,110 | -47.07% | 2,358 | -9.70% |
| Fremont | Alameda | 30,233 | 50.26% | 29,150 | 48.46% | 770 | 1.28% | 1,083 | 1.80% | 60,153 | -18.92% |
| Hayward | Alameda | 12,308 | 36.92% | 20,594 | 61.77% | 438 | 1.31% | -8,286 | -24.85% | 33,340 | -21.21% |
| Livermore | Alameda | 13,365 | 58.89% | 8,980 | 39.57% | 351 | 1.55% | 4,385 | 19.32% | 22,696 | -18.36% |
| Newark | Alameda | 5,359 | 45.22% | 6,325 | 53.37% | 167 | 1.41% | -966 | -8.15% | 11,851 | -21.36% |
| Oakland | Alameda | 22,034 | 16.81% | 107,535 | 82.06% | 1,483 | 1.13% | -85,501 | -65.24% | 131,052 | -9.03% |
| Piedmont | Alameda | 3,300 | 52.33% | 2,929 | 46.45% | 77 | 1.22% | 371 | 5.88% | 6,306 | -17.99% |
| Pleasanton | Alameda | 13,495 | 61.39% | 8,236 | 37.47% | 252 | 1.15% | 5,259 | 23.92% | 21,983 | -16.32% |
| San Leandro | Alameda | 11,121 | 39.44% | 16,765 | 59.45% | 314 | 1.11% | -5,644 | -20.01% | 28,200 | -20.41% |
| Union City | Alameda | 5,550 | 39.02% | 8,519 | 59.89% | 155 | 1.09% | -2,969 | -20.87% | 14,224 | -17.23% |
| Unincorporated Area | Alameda | 20,216 | 43.82% | 25,301 | 54.84% | 615 | 1.33% | -5,085 | -11.02% | 46,132 | -19.05% |
| Unapportioned Absentees | Alameda | 231 | 48.94% | 233 | 49.36% | 8 | 1.69% | -2 | -0.42% | 472 | 29.50% |
| Unincorporated Area | Alpine | 306 | 55.43% | 230 | 41.67% | 16 | 2.90% | 76 | 13.77% | 552 | -1.25% |
| Amador City | Amador | 53 | 64.63% | 27 | 32.93% | 2 | 2.44% | 26 | 31.71% | 82 | 18.27% |
| Ione | Amador | 439 | 55.57% | 343 | 43.42% | 8 | 1.01% | 96 | 12.15% | 790 | -14.32% |
| Jackson | Amador | 762 | 54.23% | 621 | 44.20% | 22 | 1.57% | 141 | 10.04% | 1,405 | -12.91% |
| Plymouth | Amador | 175 | 54.52% | 138 | 42.99% | 8 | 2.49% | 37 | 11.53% | 321 | -10.98% |
| Sutter Creek | Amador | 460 | 50.66% | 436 | 48.02% | 12 | 1.32% | 24 | 2.64% | 908 | -13.52% |
| Unincorporated Area | Amador | 4,012 | 55.90% | 3,011 | 41.95% | 154 | 2.15% | 1,001 | 13.95% | 7,177 | -12.22% |
| Unapportioned Absentees | Amador | 992 | 60.23% | 621 | 37.70% | 34 | 2.06% | 371 | 22.53% | 1,647 | -1.58% |
| Biggs | Butte | 273 | 58.71% | 189 | 40.65% | 3 | 0.65% | 84 | 18.06% | 465 | -14.74% |
| Chico | Butte | 6,767 | 44.78% | 8,129 | 53.79% | 217 | 1.44% | -1,362 | -9.01% | 15,113 | -18.42% |
| Gridley | Butte | 667 | 55.54% | 521 | 43.38% | 13 | 1.08% | 146 | 12.16% | 1,201 | -11.67% |
| Oroville | Butte | 1,698 | 56.00% | 1,296 | 42.74% | 38 | 1.25% | 402 | 13.26% | 3,032 | -6.31% |
| Paradise | Butte | 7,204 | 60.59% | 4,488 | 37.75% | 197 | 1.66% | 2,716 | 22.84% | 11,889 | -13.36% |
| Unincorporated Area | Butte | 23,534 | 58.96% | 15,783 | 39.54% | 597 | 1.50% | 7,751 | 19.42% | 39,914 | -12.70% |
| Angels | Calaveras | 454 | 50.84% | 416 | 46.58% | 23 | 2.58% | 38 | 4.26% | 893 | -23.65% |
| Unincorporated Area | Calaveras | 5,408 | 55.27% | 4,204 | 42.96% | 173 | 1.77% | 1,204 | 12.30% | 9,785 | -16.46% |
| Unapportioned Absentees | Calaveras | 1,778 | 61.57% | 1,054 | 36.50% | 56 | 1.94% | 724 | 25.07% | 2,888 | -10.59% |
| Colusa | Colusa | 993 | 58.04% | 697 | 40.74% | 21 | 1.23% | 296 | 17.30% | 1,711 | -11.12% |
| Williams | Colusa | 354 | 58.13% | 249 | 40.89% | 6 | 0.99% | 105 | 17.24% | 609 | -16.16% |
| Unincorporated Area | Colusa | 1,730 | 60.66% | 1,076 | 37.73% | 46 | 1.61% | 654 | 22.93% | 2,852 | -9.65% |
| Antioch | Contra Costa | 9,218 | 45.34% | 10,902 | 53.63% | 210 | 1.03% | -1,684 | -8.28% | 20,330 | -12.77% |
| Brentwood | Contra Costa | 1,103 | 50.48% | 1,066 | 48.79% | 16 | 0.73% | 37 | 1.69% | 2,185 | -8.48% |
| Clayton | Contra Costa | 2,421 | 64.99% | 1,277 | 34.28% | 27 | 0.72% | 1,144 | 30.71% | 3,725 | -12.82% |
| Concord | Contra Costa | 21,750 | 48.25% | 22,826 | 50.64% | 502 | 1.11% | -1,076 | -2.39% | 45,078 | -18.03% |
| Danville | Contra Costa | 10,538 | 67.70% | 4,887 | 31.40% | 141 | 0.91% | 5,651 | 36.30% | 15,566 | -15.19% |
| El Cerrito | Contra Costa | 3,724 | 30.30% | 8,431 | 68.60% | 135 | 1.10% | -4,707 | -38.30% | 12,290 | -16.16% |
| Hercules | Contra Costa | 2,055 | 41.77% | 2,840 | 57.72% | 25 | 0.51% | -785 | -15.96% | 4,920 | -21.43% |
| Lafayette | Contra Costa | 7,806 | 58.36% | 5,424 | 40.55% | 145 | 1.08% | 2,382 | 17.81% | 13,375 | -15.80% |
| Martinez | Contra Costa | 6,577 | 45.43% | 7,729 | 53.39% | 171 | 1.18% | -1,152 | -7.96% | 14,477 | -14.62% |
| Moraga | Contra Costa | 5,953 | 64.32% | 3,226 | 34.86% | 76 | 0.82% | 2,727 | 29.47% | 9,255 | -15.74% |
| Orinda | Contra Costa | 6,384 | 59.88% | 4,163 | 39.05% | 114 | 1.07% | 2,221 | 20.83% | 10,661 | N/A |
| Pinole | Contra Costa | 2,955 | 42.89% | 3,841 | 55.76% | 93 | 1.35% | -886 | -12.86% | 6,889 | -19.37% |
| Pittsburg | Contra Costa | 4,699 | 34.55% | 8,802 | 64.71% | 101 | 0.74% | -4,103 | -30.16% | 13,602 | -12.40% |
| Pleasant Hill | Contra Costa | 7,065 | 47.81% | 7,527 | 50.94% | 184 | 1.25% | -462 | -3.13% | 14,776 | -15.97% |
| Richmond | Contra Costa | 5,873 | 20.20% | 22,940 | 78.89% | 265 | 0.91% | -17,067 | -58.69% | 29,078 | -7.34% |
| San Pablo | Contra Costa | 1,368 | 25.24% | 3,988 | 73.58% | 64 | 1.18% | -2,620 | -48.34% | 5,420 | -15.78% |
| San Ramon | Contra Costa | 9,288 | 64.64% | 4,957 | 34.50% | 123 | 0.86% | 4,331 | 30.14% | 14,368 | -16.02% |
| Walnut Creek | Contra Costa | 20,257 | 59.28% | 13,600 | 39.80% | 317 | 0.93% | 6,657 | 19.48% | 34,174 | -17.29% |
| Unincorporated Area | Contra Costa | 29,618 | 48.30% | 30,985 | 50.52% | 724 | 1.18% | -1,367 | -2.23% | 61,327 | -15.33% |
| Crescent City | Del Norte | 384 | 46.15% | 433 | 52.04% | 15 | 1.80% | -49 | -5.89% | 832 | -21.88% |
| Unincorporated Area | Del Norte | 3,330 | 50.18% | 3,154 | 47.53% | 152 | 2.29% | 176 | 2.65% | 6,636 | -15.12% |
| Placerville | El Dorado | 2,179 | 57.12% | 1,585 | 41.55% | 51 | 1.34% | 594 | 15.57% | 3,815 | -6.84% |
| South Lake Tahoe | El Dorado | 3,233 | 51.94% | 2,895 | 46.51% | 96 | 1.54% | 338 | 5.43% | 6,224 | -17.59% |
| Unincorporated Area | El Dorado | 24,609 | 60.68% | 15,321 | 37.78% | 626 | 1.54% | 9,288 | 22.90% | 40,556 | -9.47% |
| Clovis | Fresno | 7,948 | 56.81% | 5,896 | 42.14% | 147 | 1.05% | 2,052 | 14.67% | 13,991 | -9.17% |
| Coalinga | Fresno | 1,153 | 57.05% | 838 | 41.46% | 30 | 1.48% | 315 | 15.59% | 2,021 | -12.67% |
| Firebaugh | Fresno | 207 | 38.48% | 324 | 60.22% | 7 | 1.30% | -117 | -21.75% | 538 | 3.22% |
| Fowler | Fresno | 319 | 42.08% | 434 | 57.26% | 5 | 0.66% | -115 | -15.17% | 758 | -16.61% |
| Fresno | Fresno | 37,361 | 44.87% | 44,950 | 53.98% | 953 | 1.14% | -7,589 | -9.11% | 83,264 | -7.72% |
| Huron | Fresno | 50 | 15.48% | 270 | 83.59% | 3 | 0.93% | -220 | -68.11% | 323 | -23.60% |
| Kerman | Fresno | 414 | 45.15% | 488 | 53.22% | 15 | 1.64% | -74 | -8.07% | 917 | -16.07% |
| Kingsburg | Fresno | 1,135 | 59.83% | 740 | 39.01% | 22 | 1.16% | 395 | 20.82% | 1,897 | -11.24% |
| Mendota | Fresno | 148 | 22.09% | 514 | 76.72% | 8 | 1.19% | -366 | -54.63% | 670 | -17.19% |
| Orange Cove | Fresno | 194 | 39.84% | 283 | 58.11% | 10 | 2.05% | -89 | -18.28% | 487 | 17.71% |
| Parlier | Fresno | 111 | 15.12% | 618 | 84.20% | 5 | 0.68% | -507 | -69.07% | 734 | -8.80% |
| Reedley | Fresno | 1,956 | 58.06% | 1,378 | 40.90% | 35 | 1.04% | 578 | 17.16% | 3,369 | -5.78% |
| San Joaquin | Fresno | 77 | 41.40% | 106 | 56.99% | 3 | 1.61% | -29 | -15.59% | 186 | -9.95% |
| Sanger | Fresno | 1,257 | 36.13% | 2,192 | 63.01% | 30 | 0.86% | -935 | -26.88% | 3,479 | -7.74% |
| Selma | Fresno | 1,366 | 43.27% | 1,763 | 55.84% | 28 | 0.89% | -397 | -12.58% | 3,157 | -12.67% |
| Unincorporated Area | Fresno | 25,755 | 56.97% | 18,857 | 41.71% | 593 | 1.31% | 6,898 | 15.26% | 45,205 | -9.66% |
| Unapportioned Absentees | Fresno | 15,384 | 53.52% | 12,984 | 45.17% | 377 | 1.31% | 2,400 | 8.35% | 28,745 | -7.17% |
| Orland | Glenn | 1,127 | 64.55% | 595 | 34.08% | 24 | 1.37% | 532 | 30.47% | 1,746 | -13.02% |
| Willows | Glenn | 1,107 | 58.23% | 769 | 40.45% | 25 | 1.32% | 338 | 17.78% | 1,901 | -13.03% |
| Unincorporated Area | Glenn | 2,710 | 62.78% | 1,530 | 35.44% | 77 | 1.78% | 1,180 | 27.33% | 4,317 | -15.69% |
| Arcata | Humboldt | 1,764 | 25.06% | 5,170 | 73.46% | 104 | 1.48% | -3,406 | -48.39% | 7,038 | -19.88% |
| Blue Lake | Humboldt | 133 | 25.29% | 381 | 72.43% | 12 | 2.28% | -248 | -47.15% | 526 | -33.16% |
| Eureka | Humboldt | 4,015 | 42.56% | 5,287 | 56.05% | 131 | 1.39% | -1,272 | -13.48% | 9,433 | -20.53% |
| Ferndale | Humboldt | 345 | 56.74% | 255 | 41.94% | 8 | 1.32% | 90 | 14.80% | 608 | -21.95% |
| Fortuna | Humboldt | 1,788 | 57.83% | 1,247 | 40.33% | 57 | 1.84% | 541 | 17.50% | 3,092 | -17.17% |
| Rio Dell | Humboldt | 473 | 55.78% | 361 | 42.57% | 14 | 1.65% | 112 | 13.21% | 848 | -17.27% |
| Trinidad | Humboldt | 68 | 29.69% | 156 | 68.12% | 5 | 2.18% | -88 | -38.43% | 229 | -18.93% |
| Unincorporated Area | Humboldt | 9,566 | 40.64% | 13,523 | 57.45% | 448 | 1.90% | -3,957 | -16.81% | 23,537 | -22.29% |
| Unapportioned Absentees | Humboldt | 3,308 | 48.44% | 3,401 | 49.80% | 120 | 1.76% | -93 | -1.36% | 6,829 | -20.05% |
| Brawley | Imperial | 1,976 | 50.56% | 1,902 | 48.67% | 30 | 0.77% | 74 | 1.89% | 3,908 | -10.81% |
| Calexico | Imperial | 636 | 27.93% | 1,629 | 71.54% | 12 | 0.53% | -993 | -43.61% | 2,277 | -21.40% |
| Calipatria | Imperial | 204 | 49.88% | 200 | 48.90% | 5 | 1.22% | 4 | 0.98% | 409 | -2.91% |
| El Centro | Imperial | 3,486 | 56.50% | 2,613 | 42.35% | 71 | 1.15% | 873 | 14.15% | 6,170 | -14.84% |
| Holtville | Imperial | 586 | 61.23% | 361 | 37.72% | 10 | 1.04% | 225 | 23.51% | 957 | -18.78% |
| Imperial | Imperial | 626 | 62.79% | 359 | 36.01% | 12 | 1.20% | 267 | 26.78% | 997 | -16.67% |
| Westmorland | Imperial | 134 | 45.12% | 160 | 53.87% | 3 | 1.01% | -26 | -8.75% | 297 | -16.37% |
| Unincorporated Area | Imperial | 3,553 | 60.33% | 2,268 | 38.51% | 68 | 1.15% | 1,285 | 21.82% | 5,889 | -13.36% |
| Unapportioned Absentees | Imperial | 1,688 | 68.59% | 751 | 30.52% | 22 | 0.89% | 937 | 38.07% | 2,461 | -7.74% |
| Bishop | Inyo | 778 | 63.72% | 426 | 34.89% | 17 | 1.39% | 352 | 28.83% | 1,221 | -15.79% |
| Unincorporated Area | Inyo | 4,264 | 64.48% | 2,227 | 33.68% | 122 | 1.84% | 2,037 | 30.80% | 6,613 | -9.89% |
| Arvin | Kern | 480 | 42.33% | 645 | 56.88% | 9 | 0.79% | -165 | -14.55% | 1,134 | -17.61% |
| Bakersfield | Kern | 34,169 | 62.78% | 19,782 | 36.35% | 476 | 0.87% | 14,387 | 26.43% | 54,427 | -7.73% |
| California City | Kern | 1,046 | 66.92% | 485 | 31.03% | 32 | 2.05% | 561 | 35.89% | 1,563 | -2.25% |
| Delano | Kern | 1,864 | 44.28% | 2,332 | 55.39% | 14 | 0.33% | -468 | -11.12% | 4,210 | -1.68% |
| Maricopa | Kern | 224 | 61.88% | 130 | 35.91% | 8 | 2.21% | 94 | 25.97% | 362 | -27.90% |
| McFarland | Kern | 353 | 40.95% | 503 | 58.35% | 6 | 0.70% | -150 | -17.40% | 862 | -11.05% |
| Ridgecrest | Kern | 6,551 | 68.47% | 2,857 | 29.86% | 160 | 1.67% | 3,694 | 38.61% | 9,568 | -7.15% |
| Shafter | Kern | 1,293 | 63.66% | 721 | 35.50% | 17 | 0.84% | 572 | 28.16% | 2,031 | -6.03% |
| Taft | Kern | 1,488 | 68.10% | 681 | 31.17% | 16 | 0.73% | 807 | 36.93% | 2,185 | -14.38% |
| Tehachapi | Kern | 1,059 | 60.97% | 655 | 37.71% | 23 | 1.32% | 404 | 23.26% | 1,737 | -1.38% |
| Wasco | Kern | 1,111 | 55.72% | 872 | 43.73% | 11 | 0.55% | 239 | 11.99% | 1,994 | -3.07% |
| Unincorporated Area | Kern | 40,912 | 60.87% | 25,420 | 37.82% | 875 | 1.30% | 15,492 | 23.05% | 67,207 | -8.70% |
| Avenal | Kings | 413 | 47.86% | 440 | 50.98% | 10 | 1.16% | -27 | -3.13% | 863 | -17.74% |
| Corcoran | Kings | 729 | 51.41% | 664 | 46.83% | 25 | 1.76% | 65 | 4.58% | 1,418 | -3.35% |
| Hanford | Kings | 4,111 | 54.17% | 3,405 | 44.87% | 73 | 0.96% | 706 | 9.30% | 7,589 | -17.06% |
| Lemoore | Kings | 1,742 | 63.25% | 988 | 35.88% | 24 | 0.87% | 754 | 27.38% | 2,754 | -14.25% |
| Unincorporated Area | Kings | 3,461 | 57.62% | 2,478 | 41.25% | 68 | 1.13% | 983 | 16.36% | 6,007 | -11.60% |
| Unapportioned Absentees | Kings | 1,662 | 58.30% | 1,167 | 40.93% | 22 | 0.77% | 495 | 17.36% | 2,851 | -32.11% |
| Clearlake | Lake | 1,249 | 36.84% | 2,097 | 61.86% | 44 | 1.30% | -848 | -25.01% | 3,390 | -11.80% |
| Lakeport | Lake | 830 | 55.48% | 641 | 42.85% | 25 | 1.67% | 189 | 12.63% | 1,496 | -14.72% |
| Unincorporated Area | Lake | 5,724 | 49.49% | 5,646 | 48.81% | 197 | 1.70% | 78 | 0.67% | 11,567 | -16.28% |
| Unapportioned Absentees | Lake | 1,563 | 51.28% | 1,444 | 47.38% | 41 | 1.35% | 119 | 3.90% | 3,048 | N/A |
| Susanville | Lassen | 1,233 | 54.08% | 1,011 | 44.34% | 36 | 1.58% | 222 | 9.74% | 2,280 | 0.68% |
| Unincorporated Area | Lassen | 3,264 | 60.20% | 2,017 | 37.20% | 141 | 2.60% | 1,247 | 23.00% | 5,422 | -5.46% |
| Unapportioned Absentees | Lassen | 660 | 60.33% | 418 | 38.21% | 16 | 1.46% | 242 | 22.12% | 1,094 | -14.82% |
| Agoura Hills | Los Angeles (Note: The sum of Bush’s votes across Los Angeles County municipalities exceeds the official county-wide tally by 71,413) (Note: The sum of Dukakis’s votes across Los Angeles County municipalities exceeds the official county-wide tally by 75,097) | 4,871 | 61.98% | 2,912 | 37.05% | 76 | 0.97% | 1,959 | 24.93% | 7,859 | -19.13% |
| Alhambra | Los Angeles | 10,688 | 49.59% | 10,637 | 49.35% | 228 | 1.06% | 51 | 0.24% | 21,553 | -15.08% |
| Arcadia | Los Angeles | 14,282 | 71.85% | 5,388 | 27.11% | 207 | 1.04% | 8,894 | 44.75% | 19,877 | -13.64% |
| Artesia | Los Angeles | 1,878 | 56.08% | 1,440 | 43.00% | 31 | 0.93% | 438 | 13.08% | 3,349 | -20.37% |
| Avalon | Los Angeles | 562 | 59.66% | 366 | 38.85% | 14 | 1.49% | 196 | 20.81% | 942 | -14.77% |
| Azusa | Los Angeles | 5,058 | 54.82% | 4,052 | 43.91% | 117 | 1.27% | 1,006 | 10.90% | 9,227 | -17.43% |
| Baldwin Park | Los Angeles | 4,391 | 44.47% | 5,367 | 54.35% | 117 | 1.18% | -976 | -9.88% | 9,875 | -20.46% |
| Bell | Los Angeles | 1,488 | 46.76% | 1,665 | 52.33% | 29 | 0.91% | -177 | -5.56% | 3,182 | -20.07% |
| Bell Gardens | Los Angeles | 1,039 | 40.08% | 1,512 | 58.33% | 41 | 1.58% | -473 | -18.25% | 2,592 | -23.39% |
| Bellflower | Los Angeles | 11,114 | 58.94% | 7,509 | 39.82% | 234 | 1.24% | 3,605 | 19.12% | 18,857 | -16.44% |
| Beverly Hills | Los Angeles | 6,345 | 39.31% | 9,702 | 60.10% | 95 | 0.59% | -3,357 | -20.80% | 16,142 | -14.57% |
| Bradbury | Los Angeles | 290 | 77.13% | 83 | 22.07% | 3 | 0.80% | 207 | 55.05% | 376 | -13.26% |
| Burbank | Los Angeles | 19,197 | 58.18% | 13,429 | 40.70% | 372 | 1.13% | 5,768 | 17.48% | 32,998 | -20.49% |
| Carson | Los Angeles | 8,782 | 34.24% | 16,567 | 64.59% | 299 | 1.17% | -7,785 | -30.35% | 25,648 | -13.12% |
| Cerritos | Los Angeles | 10,615 | 60.45% | 6,816 | 38.82% | 129 | 0.73% | 3,799 | 21.63% | 17,560 | -16.95% |
| Claremont | Los Angeles | 7,439 | 50.76% | 7,028 | 47.96% | 187 | 1.28% | 411 | 2.80% | 14,654 | -15.04% |
| Commerce | Los Angeles | 583 | 23.13% | 1,910 | 75.76% | 28 | 1.11% | -1,327 | -52.64% | 2,521 | -18.89% |
| Compton | Los Angeles | 1,068 | 5.44% | 18,272 | 93.11% | 285 | 1.45% | -17,204 | -87.66% | 19,625 | -4.77% |
| Covina | Los Angeles | 9,387 | 64.44% | 4,989 | 34.25% | 192 | 1.32% | 4,398 | 30.19% | 14,568 | -16.13% |
| Cudahy | Los Angeles | 585 | 38.44% | 915 | 60.12% | 22 | 1.45% | -330 | -21.68% | 1,522 | -22.30% |
| Culver City | Los Angeles | 6,060 | 37.48% | 9,946 | 61.52% | 161 | 1.00% | -3,886 | -24.04% | 16,167 | -23.75% |
| Downey | Los Angeles | 17,776 | 62.04% | 10,596 | 36.98% | 281 | 0.98% | 7,180 | 25.06% | 28,653 | -19.66% |
| Duarte | Los Angeles | 3,147 | 57.00% | 2,287 | 41.42% | 87 | 1.58% | 860 | 15.58% | 5,521 | -16.93% |
| El Monte | Los Angeles | 6,234 | 46.67% | 6,959 | 52.09% | 166 | 1.24% | -725 | -5.43% | 13,359 | -19.32% |
| El Segundo | Los Angeles | 4,479 | 65.68% | 2,228 | 32.67% | 112 | 1.64% | 2,251 | 33.01% | 6,819 | -20.07% |
| Gardena | Los Angeles | 5,181 | 39.73% | 7,709 | 59.11% | 152 | 1.17% | -2,528 | -19.38% | 13,042 | -17.95% |
| Glendale | Los Angeles | 30,361 | 62.69% | 17,456 | 36.05% | 610 | 1.26% | 12,905 | 26.65% | 48,427 | -20.29% |
| Glendora | Los Angeles | 12,809 | 70.74% | 5,082 | 28.07% | 215 | 1.19% | 7,727 | 42.68% | 18,106 | -14.19% |
| Hawaiian Gardens | Los Angeles | 723 | 41.22% | 1,012 | 57.70% | 19 | 1.08% | -289 | -16.48% | 1,754 | -24.86% |
| Hawthorne | Los Angeles | 8,673 | 48.05% | 9,117 | 50.51% | 260 | 1.44% | -444 | -2.46% | 18,050 | -24.37% |
| Hermosa Beach | Los Angeles | 5,641 | 54.76% | 4,473 | 43.42% | 188 | 1.82% | 1,168 | 11.34% | 10,302 | -12.53% |
| Hidden Hills | Los Angeles | 550 | 64.55% | 297 | 34.86% | 5 | 0.59% | 253 | 29.69% | 852 | -20.00% |
| Huntington Park | Los Angeles | 1,832 | 41.72% | 2,505 | 57.05% | 54 | 1.23% | -673 | -15.33% | 4,391 | -19.23% |
| Industry | Los Angeles | 31 | 56.36% | 20 | 36.36% | 4 | 7.27% | 11 | 20.00% | 55 | -34.39% |
| Inglewood | Los Angeles | 4,714 | 17.16% | 22,280 | 81.10% | 477 | 1.74% | -17,566 | -63.94% | 27,471 | -11.84% |
| Irwindale | Los Angeles | 106 | 36.81% | 179 | 62.15% | 3 | 1.04% | -73 | -25.35% | 288 | -20.15% |
| La Cañada Flintridge | Los Angeles | 7,254 | 73.56% | 2,510 | 25.45% | 98 | 0.99% | 4,744 | 48.10% | 9,862 | -13.14% |
| La Habra Heights | Los Angeles | 1,977 | 77.65% | 535 | 21.01% | 34 | 1.34% | 1,442 | 56.64% | 2,546 | -9.32% |
| La Mirada | Los Angeles | 10,299 | 64.81% | 5,434 | 34.20% | 157 | 0.99% | 4,865 | 30.62% | 15,890 | -17.12% |
| La Puente | Los Angeles | 2,486 | 37.77% | 3,966 | 60.26% | 130 | 1.98% | -1,480 | -22.49% | 6,582 | -22.65% |
| La Verne | Los Angeles | 7,730 | 64.68% | 4,086 | 34.19% | 136 | 1.14% | 3,644 | 30.49% | 11,952 | -15.44% |
| Lakewood | Los Angeles | 16,524 | 58.26% | 11,565 | 40.78% | 273 | 0.96% | 4,959 | 17.48% | 28,362 | -17.43% |
| Lancaster | Los Angeles | 19,176 | 73.71% | 6,587 | 25.32% | 254 | 0.98% | 12,589 | 48.39% | 26,017 | -13.72% |
| Lawndale | Los Angeles | 3,417 | 55.94% | 2,589 | 42.39% | 102 | 1.67% | 828 | 13.56% | 6,108 | -20.92% |
| Lomita | Los Angeles | 3,902 | 60.10% | 2,496 | 38.44% | 95 | 1.46% | 1,406 | 21.65% | 6,493 | -16.59% |
| Long Beach | Los Angeles | 68,260 | 49.92% | 66,753 | 48.82% | 1,729 | 1.26% | 1,507 | 1.10% | 136,742 | -14.59% |
| Los Angeles | Los Angeles | 370,980 | 37.44% | 607,541 | 61.32% | 12,266 | 1.24% | -236,561 | -23.88% | 990,787 | -13.07% |
| Lynwood | Los Angeles | 1,880 | 22.95% | 6,193 | 75.62% | 117 | 1.43% | -4,313 | -52.66% | 8,190 | -11.68% |
| Manhattan Beach | Los Angeles | 10,314 | 59.41% | 6,824 | 39.31% | 222 | 1.28% | 3,490 | 20.10% | 17,360 | -13.05% |
| Maywood | Los Angeles | 777 | 38.75% | 1,209 | 60.30% | 19 | 0.95% | -432 | -21.55% | 2,005 | -25.57% |
| Monrovia | Los Angeles | 6,224 | 57.64% | 4,397 | 40.72% | 177 | 1.64% | 1,827 | 16.92% | 10,798 | -16.50% |
| Montebello | Los Angeles | 5,527 | 38.32% | 8,803 | 61.03% | 93 | 0.64% | -3,276 | -22.71% | 14,423 | -17.75% |
| Monterey Park | Los Angeles | 6,608 | 45.53% | 7,801 | 53.76% | 103 | 0.71% | -1,193 | -8.22% | 14,512 | -14.46% |
| Norwalk | Los Angeles | 10,749 | 49.02% | 10,961 | 49.98% | 219 | 1.00% | -212 | -0.97% | 21,929 | -20.71% |
| Palmdale | Los Angeles | 9,114 | 70.70% | 3,633 | 28.18% | 144 | 1.12% | 5,481 | 42.52% | 12,891 | -19.85% |
| Palos Verdes Estates | Los Angeles | 5,044 | 73.62% | 1,738 | 25.37% | 69 | 1.01% | 3,306 | 48.26% | 6,851 | -10.15% |
| Paramount | Los Angeles | 3,243 | 44.76% | 3,934 | 54.29% | 69 | 0.95% | -691 | -9.54% | 7,246 | -20.04% |
| Pasadena | Los Angeles | 19,408 | 44.99% | 23,078 | 53.49% | 655 | 1.52% | -3,670 | -8.51% | 43,141 | -13.07% |
| Pico Rivera | Los Angeles | 4,748 | 32.68% | 9,691 | 66.71% | 89 | 0.61% | -4,943 | -34.02% | 14,528 | -20.26% |
| Pomona | Los Angeles | 11,622 | 46.29% | 13,131 | 52.30% | 353 | 1.41% | -1,509 | -6.01% | 25,106 | -12.89% |
| Rancho Palos Verdes | Los Angeles | 13,221 | 68.23% | 5,920 | 30.55% | 236 | 1.22% | 7,301 | 37.68% | 19,377 | -13.33% |
| Redondo Beach | Los Angeles | 15,296 | 59.20% | 10,194 | 39.45% | 348 | 1.35% | 5,102 | 19.75% | 25,838 | -16.12% |
| Rolling Hills | Los Angeles | 786 | 82.13% | 157 | 16.41% | 14 | 1.46% | 629 | 65.73% | 957 | -6.87% |
| Rolling Hills Estates | Los Angeles | 3,461 | 75.03% | 1,107 | 24.00% | 45 | 0.98% | 2,354 | 51.03% | 4,613 | -10.15% |
| Rosemead | Los Angeles | 4,011 | 45.45% | 4,706 | 53.33% | 108 | 1.22% | -695 | -7.88% | 8,825 | -16.27% |
| San Dimas | Los Angeles | 7,657 | 66.30% | 3,775 | 32.69% | 117 | 1.01% | 3,882 | 33.61% | 11,549 | -12.93% |
| San Fernando | Los Angeles | 1,472 | 39.98% | 2,162 | 58.72% | 48 | 1.30% | -690 | -18.74% | 3,682 | -26.64% |
| San Gabriel | Los Angeles | 4,999 | 54.38% | 4,090 | 44.50% | 103 | 1.12% | 909 | 9.89% | 9,192 | -17.59% |
| San Marino | Los Angeles | 4,492 | 78.77% | 1,160 | 20.34% | 51 | 0.89% | 3,332 | 58.43% | 5,703 | -10.26% |
| Santa Clarita | Los Angeles | 26,947 | 68.90% | 11,722 | 29.97% | 439 | 1.12% | 15,225 | 38.93% | 39,108 | N/A |
| Santa Fe Springs | Los Angeles | 1,854 | 41.26% | 2,598 | 57.81% | 42 | 0.93% | -744 | -16.56% | 4,494 | -17.99% |
| Santa Monica | Los Angeles | 15,754 | 35.91% | 27,608 | 62.94% | 504 | 1.15% | -11,854 | -27.02% | 43,866 | -15.53% |
| Sierra Madre | Los Angeles | 3,185 | 58.74% | 2,157 | 39.78% | 80 | 1.48% | 1,028 | 18.96% | 5,422 | -18.73% |
| Signal Hill | Los Angeles | 1,306 | 50.46% | 1,230 | 47.53% | 52 | 2.01% | 76 | 2.94% | 2,588 | -16.77% |
| South El Monte | Los Angeles | 1,057 | 33.81% | 2,041 | 65.29% | 28 | 0.90% | -984 | -31.48% | 3,126 | -24.11% |
| South Gate | Los Angeles | 5,618 | 47.86% | 6,010 | 51.20% | 111 | 0.95% | -392 | -3.34% | 11,739 | -19.90% |
| South Pasadena | Los Angeles | 5,169 | 51.52% | 4,728 | 47.12% | 136 | 1.36% | 441 | 4.40% | 10,033 | -22.05% |
| Temple City | Los Angeles | 7,797 | 62.48% | 4,514 | 36.17% | 168 | 1.35% | 3,283 | 26.31% | 12,479 | -19.37% |
| Torrance | Los Angeles | 37,432 | 64.77% | 19,695 | 34.08% | 669 | 1.16% | 17,737 | 30.69% | 57,796 | -15.53% |
| Walnut | Los Angeles | 4,653 | 62.32% | 2,746 | 36.78% | 67 | 0.90% | 1,907 | 25.54% | 7,466 | -18.68% |
| West Covina | Los Angeles | 16,459 | 57.18% | 11,967 | 41.57% | 361 | 1.25% | 4,492 | 15.60% | 28,787 | -19.01% |
| West Hollywood | Los Angeles | 4,017 | 23.19% | 13,140 | 75.85% | 166 | 0.96% | -9,123 | -52.66% | 17,323 | N/A |
| Westlake Village | Los Angeles | 2,186 | 68.14% | 1,001 | 31.20% | 21 | 0.65% | 1,185 | 36.94% | 3,208 | -14.01% |
| Whittier | Los Angeles | 16,641 | 61.88% | 10,068 | 37.44% | 184 | 0.68% | 6,573 | 24.44% | 26,893 | -17.16% |
| Unincorporated Area | Los Angeles | 124,084 | 47.44% | 135,423 | 51.78% | 2,031 | 0.78% | -11,339 | -4.34% | 261,538 | -15.92% |
| Unapportioned Absentees | Los Angeles | 146,333 | 54.55% | 119,370 | 44.50% | 2,539 | 0.95% | 26,963 | 10.05% | 268,242 | -20.07% |
| Chowchilla | Madera | 749 | 52.20% | 655 | 45.64% | 31 | 2.16% | 94 | 6.55% | 1,435 | -14.98% |
| Madera | Madera | 2,566 | 44.37% | 3,133 | 54.18% | 84 | 1.45% | -567 | -9.80% | 5,783 | -13.89% |
| Unincorporated Area | Madera | 7,853 | 57.29% | 5,623 | 41.02% | 232 | 1.69% | 2,230 | 16.27% | 13,708 | -10.99% |
| Unapportioned Absentees | Madera | 2,087 | 62.21% | 1,231 | 36.69% | 37 | 1.10% | 856 | 25.51% | 3,355 | -13.61% |
| Belvedere | Marin | 898 | 61.59% | 537 | 36.83% | 23 | 1.58% | 361 | 24.76% | 1,458 | -5.66% |
| Corte Madera | Marin | 1,736 | 37.10% | 2,868 | 61.30% | 75 | 1.60% | -1,132 | -24.19% | 4,679 | -18.59% |
| Fairfax | Marin | 909 | 21.52% | 3,266 | 77.34% | 48 | 1.14% | -2,357 | -55.81% | 4,223 | -15.74% |
| Larkspur | Marin | 2,840 | 42.59% | 3,762 | 56.41% | 67 | 1.00% | -922 | -13.83% | 6,669 | -17.89% |
| Mill Valley | Marin | 2,324 | 29.41% | 5,465 | 69.17% | 112 | 1.42% | -3,141 | -39.75% | 7,901 | -13.38% |
| Novato | Marin | 10,004 | 49.78% | 9,802 | 48.78% | 289 | 1.44% | 202 | 1.01% | 20,095 | -18.68% |
| Ross | Marin | 766 | 53.19% | 649 | 45.07% | 25 | 1.74% | 117 | 8.13% | 1,440 | -5.01% |
| San Anselmo | Marin | 1,906 | 27.54% | 4,922 | 71.11% | 94 | 1.36% | -3,016 | -43.57% | 6,922 | -17.12% |
| San Rafael | Marin | 9,475 | 41.41% | 13,076 | 57.15% | 329 | 1.44% | -3,601 | -15.74% | 22,880 | -16.51% |
| Sausalito | Marin | 1,548 | 35.45% | 2,768 | 63.38% | 51 | 1.17% | -1,220 | -27.94% | 4,367 | -13.47% |
| Tiburon | Marin | 2,083 | 47.90% | 2,212 | 50.86% | 54 | 1.24% | -129 | -2.97% | 4,349 | -17.61% |
| Unincorporated Area | Marin | 12,366 | 37.55% | 20,067 | 60.93% | 501 | 1.52% | -7,701 | -23.38% | 32,934 | -14.23% |
| Unincorporated Area | Mariposa | 3,768 | 54.55% | 2,998 | 43.40% | 142 | 2.06% | 770 | 11.15% | 6,908 | -13.25% |
| Fort Bragg | Mendocino | 742 | 35.88% | 1,283 | 62.04% | 43 | 2.08% | -541 | -26.16% | 2,068 | -28.83% |
| Point Arena | Mendocino | 55 | 40.44% | 76 | 55.88% | 5 | 3.68% | -21 | -15.44% | 136 | -32.32% |
| Ukiah | Mendocino | 2,129 | 46.13% | 2,374 | 51.44% | 112 | 2.43% | -245 | -5.31% | 4,615 | -19.77% |
| Willits | Mendocino | 650 | 46.66% | 703 | 50.47% | 40 | 2.87% | -53 | -3.80% | 1,393 | -20.18% |
| Unincorporated Area | Mendocino | 7,647 | 40.20% | 10,844 | 57.01% | 530 | 2.79% | -3,197 | -16.81% | 19,021 | -18.77% |
| Unapportioned Absentees | Mendocino | 1,756 | 47.31% | 1,872 | 50.43% | 84 | 2.26% | -116 | -3.12% | 3,712 | -20.98% |
| Atwater | Merced | 2,603 | 56.85% | 1,907 | 41.65% | 69 | 1.51% | 696 | 15.20% | 4,579 | -12.75% |
| Dos Palos | Merced | 441 | 50.52% | 414 | 47.42% | 18 | 2.06% | 27 | 3.09% | 873 | -24.08% |
| Gustine | Merced | 414 | 35.03% | 751 | 63.54% | 17 | 1.44% | -337 | -28.51% | 1,182 | -17.68% |
| Livingston | Merced | 153 | 28.28% | 382 | 70.61% | 6 | 1.11% | -229 | -42.33% | 541 | -26.04% |
| Los Banos | Merced | 1,393 | 43.94% | 1,731 | 54.61% | 46 | 1.45% | -338 | -10.66% | 3,170 | -18.97% |
| Merced | Merced | 5,660 | 48.08% | 5,939 | 50.45% | 172 | 1.46% | -279 | -2.37% | 11,771 | -14.42% |
| Unincorporated Area | Merced | 7,388 | 52.46% | 6,485 | 46.05% | 210 | 1.49% | 903 | 6.41% | 14,083 | -15.44% |
| Unapportioned Absentees | Merced | 3,665 | 59.16% | 2,476 | 39.97% | 54 | 0.87% | 1,189 | 19.19% | 6,195 | -18.59% |
| Alturas | Modoc | 635 | 59.74% | 409 | 38.48% | 19 | 1.79% | 226 | 21.26% | 1,063 | -8.24% |
| Unincorporated Area | Modoc | 1,883 | 63.74% | 1,007 | 34.09% | 64 | 2.17% | 876 | 29.65% | 2,954 | -17.26% |
| Unincorporated Area | Mono | 2,177 | 61.38% | 1,284 | 36.20% | 86 | 2.42% | 893 | 25.18% | 3,547 | -20.98% |
| Carmel-by-the-Sea | Monterey | 1,490 | 48.02% | 1,577 | 50.82% | 36 | 1.16% | -87 | -2.80% | 3,103 | -9.42% |
| Del Rey Oaks | Monterey | 399 | 50.44% | 379 | 47.91% | 13 | 1.64% | 20 | 2.53% | 791 | -16.79% |
| Gonzales | Monterey | 291 | 38.96% | 447 | 59.84% | 9 | 1.20% | -156 | -20.88% | 747 | -21.36% |
| Greenfield | Monterey | 506 | 41.78% | 690 | 56.98% | 15 | 1.24% | -184 | -15.19% | 1,211 | -31.53% |
| King City | Monterey | 784 | 60.40% | 503 | 38.75% | 11 | 0.85% | 281 | 21.65% | 1,298 | -17.13% |
| Marina | Monterey | 2,563 | 52.47% | 2,268 | 46.43% | 54 | 1.11% | 295 | 6.04% | 4,885 | -12.99% |
| Monterey | Monterey | 5,598 | 48.23% | 5,850 | 50.40% | 159 | 1.37% | -252 | -2.17% | 11,607 | -11.03% |
| Pacific Grove | Monterey | 3,430 | 40.94% | 4,818 | 57.50% | 131 | 1.56% | -1,388 | -16.57% | 8,379 | -11.27% |
| Salinas | Monterey | 12,859 | 49.67% | 12,725 | 49.15% | 307 | 1.19% | 134 | 0.52% | 25,891 | -17.99% |
| Sand City | Monterey | 38 | 38.00% | 60 | 60.00% | 2 | 2.00% | -22 | -22.00% | 100 | -11.41% |
| Seaside | Monterey | 2,898 | 37.41% | 4,767 | 61.53% | 82 | 1.06% | -1,869 | -24.13% | 7,747 | -6.29% |
| Soledad | Monterey | 307 | 30.82% | 676 | 67.87% | 13 | 1.31% | -369 | -37.05% | 996 | -19.58% |
| Unincorporated Area | Monterey | 18,850 | 56.10% | 14,224 | 42.33% | 526 | 1.57% | 4,626 | 13.77% | 33,600 | -14.94% |
| Unapportioned Absentees | Monterey | 9 | 39.13% | 14 | 60.87% | 0 | 0.00% | -5 | -21.74% | 23 | -87.74% |
| Calistoga | Napa | 670 | 45.55% | 773 | 52.55% | 28 | 1.90% | -103 | -7.00% | 1,471 | -16.60% |
| Napa | Napa | 10,097 | 47.63% | 10,776 | 50.83% | 326 | 1.54% | -679 | -3.20% | 21,199 | -16.55% |
| St. Helena | Napa | 1,000 | 50.97% | 930 | 47.40% | 32 | 1.63% | 70 | 3.57% | 1,962 | -16.44% |
| Yountville | Napa | 507 | 41.49% | 701 | 57.36% | 14 | 1.15% | -194 | -15.88% | 1,222 | -5.78% |
| Unincorporated Area | Napa | 6,644 | 53.00% | 5,629 | 44.90% | 263 | 2.10% | 1,015 | 8.10% | 12,536 | -14.16% |
| Unapportioned Absentees | Napa | 4,317 | 54.66% | 3,474 | 43.99% | 107 | 1.35% | 843 | 10.67% | 7,898 | -15.86% |
| Grass Valley | Nevada | 1,744 | 53.27% | 1,453 | 44.38% | 77 | 2.35% | 291 | 8.89% | 3,274 | -13.16% |
| Nevada City | Nevada | 555 | 41.76% | 749 | 56.36% | 25 | 1.88% | -194 | -14.60% | 1,329 | -6.04% |
| Unincorporated Area | Nevada | 15,200 | 57.75% | 10,681 | 40.58% | 441 | 1.68% | 4,519 | 17.17% | 26,322 | -11.02% |
| Unapportioned Absentees | Nevada | 3,884 | 63.72% | 2,097 | 34.41% | 114 | 1.87% | 1,787 | 29.32% | 6,095 | -5.00% |
| Anaheim | Orange | 52,954 | 67.21% | 24,881 | 31.58% | 959 | 1.22% | 28,073 | 35.63% | 78,794 | -14.75% |
| Brea | Orange | 10,372 | 71.06% | 4,061 | 27.82% | 164 | 1.12% | 6,311 | 43.23% | 14,597 | -13.46% |
| Buena Park | Orange | 14,353 | 63.70% | 7,934 | 35.21% | 244 | 1.08% | 6,419 | 28.49% | 22,531 | -16.75% |
| Costa Mesa | Orange | 22,534 | 64.47% | 11,849 | 33.90% | 571 | 1.63% | 10,685 | 30.57% | 34,954 | -15.67% |
| Cypress | Orange | 11,495 | 65.87% | 5,815 | 33.32% | 140 | 0.80% | 5,680 | 32.55% | 17,450 | -16.20% |
| Fountain Valley | Orange | 16,855 | 70.39% | 6,834 | 28.54% | 257 | 1.07% | 10,021 | 41.85% | 23,946 | -15.50% |
| Fullerton | Orange | 29,225 | 67.66% | 13,446 | 31.13% | 520 | 1.20% | 15,779 | 36.53% | 43,191 | -12.94% |
| Garden Grove | Orange | 29,133 | 65.00% | 15,041 | 33.56% | 644 | 1.44% | 14,092 | 31.44% | 44,818 | -16.02% |
| Huntington Beach | Orange | 52,878 | 67.51% | 24,544 | 31.33% | 906 | 1.16% | 28,334 | 36.17% | 78,328 | -13.11% |
| Irvine | Orange | 30,258 | 66.43% | 14,815 | 32.53% | 475 | 1.04% | 15,443 | 33.90% | 45,548 | -13.59% |
| La Habra | Orange | 11,247 | 65.86% | 5,664 | 33.17% | 165 | 0.97% | 5,583 | 32.70% | 17,076 | -15.33% |
| La Palma | Orange | 4,303 | 69.68% | 1,814 | 29.38% | 58 | 0.94% | 2,489 | 40.31% | 6,175 | -13.72% |
| Laguna Beach | Orange | 6,752 | 52.01% | 6,053 | 46.62% | 178 | 1.37% | 699 | 5.38% | 12,983 | -10.40% |
| Los Alamitos | Orange | 2,929 | 62.28% | 1,721 | 36.59% | 53 | 1.13% | 1,208 | 25.69% | 4,703 | -16.04% |
| Mission Viejo | Orange | 22,854 | 73.82% | 7,844 | 25.34% | 260 | 0.84% | 15,010 | 48.49% | 30,958 | N/A |
| Newport Beach | Orange | 28,344 | 74.97% | 9,080 | 24.02% | 381 | 1.01% | 19,264 | 50.96% | 37,805 | -8.43% |
| Orange | Orange | 29,946 | 71.02% | 11,716 | 27.78% | 506 | 1.20% | 18,230 | 43.23% | 42,168 | -11.88% |
| Placentia | Orange | 11,328 | 70.31% | 4,612 | 28.62% | 172 | 1.07% | 6,716 | 41.68% | 16,112 | -11.90% |
| San Clemente | Orange | 11,707 | 68.51% | 5,205 | 30.46% | 175 | 1.02% | 6,502 | 38.05% | 17,087 | -16.37% |
| San Juan Capistrano | Orange | 7,459 | 70.98% | 2,914 | 27.73% | 136 | 1.29% | 4,545 | 43.25% | 10,509 | -12.48% |
| Santa Ana | Orange | 28,847 | 58.10% | 20,073 | 40.43% | 729 | 1.47% | 8,774 | 17.67% | 49,649 | -16.73% |
| Seal Beach | Orange | 9,121 | 59.78% | 6,007 | 39.37% | 129 | 0.85% | 3,114 | 20.41% | 15,257 | -11.36% |
| Stanton | Orange | 4,954 | 59.65% | 3,251 | 39.15% | 100 | 1.20% | 1,703 | 20.51% | 8,305 | -16.73% |
| Tustin | Orange | 10,750 | 69.44% | 4,533 | 29.28% | 197 | 1.27% | 6,217 | 40.16% | 15,480 | -12.56% |
| Villa Park | Orange | 3,062 | 83.82% | 557 | 15.25% | 34 | 0.93% | 2,505 | 68.57% | 3,653 | -6.20% |
| Westminster | Orange | 18,133 | 65.83% | 9,058 | 32.88% | 356 | 1.29% | 9,075 | 32.94% | 27,547 | -14.39% |
| Yorba Linda | Orange | 16,936 | 77.90% | 4,612 | 21.21% | 193 | 0.89% | 12,324 | 56.69% | 21,741 | -9.26% |
| Unincorporated Area | Orange | 87,501 | 70.62% | 35,079 | 28.31% | 1,328 | 1.07% | 52,422 | 42.31% | 123,908 | -13.11% |
| Auburn | Placer | 2,102 | 56.86% | 1,550 | 41.93% | 45 | 1.22% | 552 | 14.93% | 3,697 | -9.96% |
| Colfax | Placer | 177 | 46.09% | 196 | 51.04% | 11 | 2.86% | -19 | -4.95% | 384 | -11.81% |
| Lincoln | Placer | 964 | 54.65% | 773 | 43.82% | 27 | 1.53% | 191 | 10.83% | 1,764 | -2.45% |
| Loomis | Placer | 1,301 | 60.26% | 823 | 38.12% | 35 | 1.62% | 478 | 22.14% | 2,159 | N/A |
| Rocklin | Placer | 3,650 | 63.03% | 2,068 | 35.71% | 73 | 1.26% | 1,582 | 27.32% | 5,791 | -7.50% |
| Roseville | Placer | 7,995 | 58.09% | 5,644 | 41.01% | 124 | 0.90% | 2,351 | 17.08% | 13,763 | -5.15% |
| Unincorporated Area | Placer | 18,425 | 59.05% | 12,226 | 39.18% | 551 | 1.77% | 6,199 | 19.87% | 31,202 | -9.61% |
| Unapportioned Absentees | Placer | 7,482 | 62.97% | 4,236 | 35.65% | 164 | 1.38% | 3,246 | 27.32% | 11,882 | -2.82% |
| Portola | Plumas | 241 | 36.35% | 404 | 60.94% | 18 | 2.71% | -163 | -24.59% | 663 | -21.25% |
| Unincorporated Area | Plumas | 4,362 | 52.23% | 3,847 | 46.06% | 143 | 1.71% | 515 | 6.17% | 8,352 | -9.39% |
| Banning | Riverside | 3,121 | 51.44% | 2,885 | 47.55% | 61 | 1.01% | 236 | 3.89% | 6,067 | -3.48% |
| Beaumont | Riverside | 1,483 | 54.01% | 1,228 | 44.72% | 35 | 1.27% | 255 | 9.29% | 2,746 | -9.10% |
| Blythe | Riverside | 1,001 | 52.19% | 903 | 47.08% | 14 | 0.73% | 98 | 5.11% | 1,918 | -9.01% |
| Cathedral City | Riverside | 3,662 | 54.53% | 2,998 | 44.65% | 55 | 0.82% | 664 | 9.89% | 6,715 | -11.44% |
| Coachella | Riverside | 317 | 19.90% | 1,267 | 79.54% | 9 | 0.56% | -950 | -59.64% | 1,593 | -19.83% |
| Corona | Riverside | 11,902 | 66.41% | 5,864 | 32.72% | 156 | 0.87% | 6,038 | 33.69% | 17,922 | -7.19% |
| Desert Hot Springs | Riverside | 1,572 | 51.09% | 1,468 | 47.71% | 37 | 1.20% | 104 | 3.38% | 3,077 | -10.73% |
| Hemet | Riverside | 8,541 | 59.95% | 5,576 | 39.14% | 130 | 0.91% | 2,965 | 20.81% | 14,247 | -8.09% |
| Indian Wells | Riverside | 1,276 | 83.51% | 239 | 15.64% | 13 | 0.85% | 1,037 | 67.87% | 1,528 | -9.09% |
| Indio | Riverside | 2,868 | 48.50% | 3,008 | 50.86% | 38 | 0.64% | -140 | -2.37% | 5,914 | -15.58% |
| La Quinta | Riverside | 1,817 | 66.05% | 912 | 33.15% | 22 | 0.80% | 905 | 32.90% | 2,751 | -9.54% |
| Lake Elsinore | Riverside | 2,466 | 57.72% | 1,765 | 41.32% | 41 | 0.96% | 701 | 16.41% | 4,272 | -5.24% |
| Moreno Valley | Riverside | 17,291 | 61.28% | 10,695 | 37.90% | 232 | 0.82% | 6,596 | 23.38% | 28,218 | N/A |
| Norco | Riverside | 4,684 | 69.12% | 2,022 | 29.84% | 71 | 1.05% | 2,662 | 39.28% | 6,777 | -13.02% |
| Palm Desert | Riverside | 5,921 | 68.04% | 2,725 | 31.31% | 56 | 0.64% | 3,196 | 36.73% | 8,702 | -15.31% |
| Palm Springs | Riverside | 8,111 | 52.77% | 7,149 | 46.51% | 111 | 0.72% | 962 | 6.26% | 15,371 | -11.78% |
| Perris | Riverside | 1,864 | 49.52% | 1,860 | 49.42% | 40 | 1.06% | 4 | 0.11% | 3,764 | -6.24% |
| Rancho Mirage | Riverside | 3,041 | 66.34% | 1,509 | 32.92% | 34 | 0.74% | 1,532 | 33.42% | 4,584 | -12.15% |
| Riverside | Riverside | 40,926 | 56.07% | 31,376 | 42.99% | 686 | 0.94% | 9,550 | 13.08% | 72,988 | -8.23% |
| San Jacinto | Riverside | 2,214 | 54.01% | 1,835 | 44.77% | 50 | 1.22% | 379 | 9.25% | 4,099 | -7.82% |
| Unincorporated Area | Riverside | 75,901 | 61.67% | 45,838 | 37.25% | 1,332 | 1.08% | 30,063 | 24.43% | 123,071 | -7.11% |
| Folsom | Sacramento | 5,787 | 66.04% | 2,867 | 32.72% | 109 | 1.24% | 2,920 | 33.32% | 8,763 | -5.65% |
| Galt | Sacramento | 1,235 | 53.84% | 1,025 | 44.68% | 34 | 1.48% | 210 | 9.15% | 2,294 | -15.09% |
| Isleton | Sacramento | 125 | 40.45% | 177 | 57.28% | 7 | 2.27% | -52 | -16.83% | 309 | -16.19% |
| Sacramento | Sacramento | 54,382 | 39.70% | 80,795 | 58.99% | 1,798 | 1.31% | -26,413 | -19.28% | 136,975 | -9.37% |
| Unincorporated Area | Sacramento | 140,303 | 56.73% | 103,693 | 41.93% | 3,307 | 1.34% | 36,610 | 14.80% | 247,303 | -9.42% |
| Hollister | San Benito | 2,142 | 47.48% | 2,297 | 50.92% | 72 | 1.60% | -155 | -3.44% | 4,511 | -12.61% |
| San Juan Bautista | San Benito | 268 | 41.10% | 370 | 56.75% | 14 | 2.15% | -102 | -15.64% | 652 | -20.13% |
| Unincorporated Area | San Benito | 2,990 | 62.24% | 1,734 | 36.09% | 80 | 1.67% | 1,256 | 26.14% | 4,804 | -8.49% |
| Unapportioned Absentees | San Benito | 178 | 52.20% | 158 | 46.33% | 5 | 1.47% | 20 | 5.87% | 341 | -31.01% |
| Adelanto | San Bernardino | 569 | 59.46% | 363 | 37.93% | 25 | 2.61% | 206 | 21.53% | 957 | -17.65% |
| Barstow | San Bernardino | 2,776 | 50.00% | 2,708 | 48.78% | 68 | 1.22% | 68 | 1.22% | 5,552 | -13.53% |
| Big Bear Lake | San Bernardino | 1,670 | 71.61% | 627 | 26.89% | 35 | 1.50% | 1,043 | 44.73% | 2,332 | -8.25% |
| Chino | San Bernardino | 9,316 | 65.02% | 4,867 | 33.97% | 145 | 1.01% | 4,449 | 31.05% | 14,328 | -15.36% |
| Colton | San Bernardino | 4,057 | 43.24% | 5,209 | 55.52% | 116 | 1.24% | -1,152 | -12.28% | 9,382 | -1.23% |
| Fontana | San Bernardino | 9,470 | 52.88% | 8,194 | 45.76% | 243 | 1.36% | 1,276 | 7.13% | 17,907 | -2.87% |
| Grand Terrace | San Bernardino | 2,498 | 63.22% | 1,406 | 35.59% | 47 | 1.19% | 1,092 | 27.64% | 3,951 | -12.90% |
| Hesperia | San Bernardino | 9,301 | 64.00% | 4,952 | 34.07% | 280 | 1.93% | 4,349 | 29.92% | 14,533 | N/A |
| Highland | San Bernardino | 4,648 | 55.21% | 3,635 | 43.18% | 136 | 1.62% | 1,013 | 12.03% | 8,419 | N/A |
| Loma Linda | San Bernardino | 3,319 | 69.52% | 1,360 | 28.49% | 95 | 1.99% | 1,959 | 41.03% | 4,774 | -8.82% |
| Montclair | San Bernardino | 4,115 | 57.49% | 2,939 | 41.06% | 104 | 1.45% | 1,176 | 16.43% | 7,158 | -16.60% |
| Needles | San Bernardino | 719 | 47.71% | 758 | 50.30% | 30 | 1.99% | -39 | -2.59% | 1,507 | -15.91% |
| Ontario | San Bernardino | 18,962 | 60.84% | 11,794 | 37.84% | 412 | 1.32% | 7,168 | 23.00% | 31,168 | -12.68% |
| Rancho Cucamonga | San Bernardino | 20,864 | 68.09% | 9,468 | 30.90% | 312 | 1.02% | 11,396 | 37.19% | 30,644 | -11.93% |
| Redlands | San Bernardino | 14,690 | 62.94% | 8,388 | 35.94% | 261 | 1.12% | 6,302 | 27.00% | 23,339 | -11.34% |
| Rialto | San Bernardino | 8,750 | 48.00% | 9,220 | 50.57% | 261 | 1.43% | -470 | -2.58% | 18,231 | -12.58% |
| San Bernardino | San Bernardino | 19,978 | 46.81% | 22,166 | 51.94% | 532 | 1.25% | -2,188 | -5.13% | 42,676 | -6.37% |
| Twentynine Palms | San Bernardino | 2,036 | 66.41% | 966 | 31.51% | 64 | 2.09% | 1,070 | 34.90% | 3,066 | N/A |
| Upland | San Bernardino | 16,490 | 68.22% | 7,406 | 30.64% | 277 | 1.15% | 9,084 | 37.58% | 24,173 | -12.67% |
| Victorville | San Bernardino | 4,838 | 59.88% | 3,105 | 38.43% | 137 | 1.70% | 1,733 | 21.45% | 8,080 | -11.82% |
| Unincorporated Area | San Bernardino | 76,101 | 63.52% | 41,587 | 34.71% | 2,127 | 1.78% | 34,514 | 28.81% | 119,815 | -8.59% |
| Carlsbad | San Diego | 17,732 | 65.28% | 9,117 | 33.56% | 316 | 1.16% | 8,615 | 31.71% | 27,165 | -13.08% |
| Chula Vista | San Diego | 24,401 | 59.01% | 16,414 | 39.69% | 538 | 1.30% | 7,987 | 19.31% | 41,353 | -15.19% |
| Coronado | San Diego | 6,360 | 71.71% | 2,413 | 27.21% | 96 | 1.08% | 3,947 | 44.50% | 8,869 | -10.69% |
| Del Mar | San Diego | 1,687 | 51.40% | 1,550 | 47.23% | 45 | 1.37% | 137 | 4.17% | 3,282 | -5.59% |
| El Cajon | San Diego | 18,122 | 65.34% | 9,206 | 33.19% | 409 | 1.47% | 8,916 | 32.14% | 27,737 | -9.27% |
| Encinitas | San Diego | 13,797 | 56.64% | 10,143 | 41.64% | 421 | 1.73% | 3,654 | 15.00% | 24,361 | N/A |
| Escondido | San Diego | 25,503 | 70.04% | 10,395 | 28.55% | 512 | 1.41% | 15,108 | 41.49% | 36,410 | -6.08% |
| Imperial Beach | San Diego | 3,575 | 58.87% | 2,387 | 39.31% | 111 | 1.83% | 1,188 | 19.56% | 6,073 | -17.38% |
| La Mesa | San Diego | 14,775 | 59.53% | 9,612 | 38.73% | 433 | 1.74% | 5,163 | 20.80% | 24,820 | -12.11% |
| Lemon Grove | San Diego | 4,669 | 56.61% | 3,462 | 41.98% | 116 | 1.41% | 1,207 | 14.64% | 8,247 | -14.10% |
| National City | San Diego | 4,311 | 46.72% | 4,803 | 52.05% | 113 | 1.22% | -492 | -5.33% | 9,227 | -12.09% |
| Oceanside | San Diego | 23,872 | 62.23% | 13,954 | 36.37% | 537 | 1.40% | 9,918 | 25.85% | 38,363 | -12.05% |
| Poway | San Diego | 12,940 | 72.03% | 4,739 | 26.38% | 286 | 1.59% | 8,201 | 45.65% | 17,965 | -9.19% |
| San Diego | San Diego | 220,472 | 54.67% | 177,207 | 43.94% | 5,631 | 1.40% | 43,265 | 10.73% | 403,310 | -9.79% |
| San Marcos | San Diego | 8,134 | 65.50% | 4,135 | 33.30% | 149 | 1.20% | 3,999 | 32.20% | 12,418 | -14.76% |
| Santee | San Diego | 12,608 | 66.92% | 5,891 | 31.27% | 341 | 1.81% | 6,717 | 35.65% | 18,840 | -12.03% |
| Solana Beach | San Diego | 4,235 | 61.47% | 2,553 | 37.06% | 101 | 1.47% | 1,682 | 24.42% | 6,889 | N/A |
| Vista | San Diego | 13,294 | 66.48% | 6,424 | 32.12% | 280 | 1.40% | 6,870 | 34.35% | 19,998 | -10.75% |
| Unincorporated Area | San Diego | 92,656 | 69.26% | 38,859 | 29.05% | 2,268 | 1.70% | 53,797 | 40.21% | 133,783 | -5.53% |
| San Francisco | San Francisco | 72,503 | 26.14% | 201,887 | 72.78% | 2,989 | 1.08% | -129,384 | -46.65% | 277,379 | -10.73% |
| Escalon | San Joaquin | 878 | 59.28% | 590 | 39.84% | 13 | 0.88% | 288 | 19.45% | 1,481 | -16.44% |
| Lodi | San Joaquin | 11,908 | 66.43% | 5,816 | 32.44% | 202 | 1.13% | 6,092 | 33.98% | 17,926 | -11.60% |
| Manteca | San Joaquin | 6,563 | 56.27% | 4,979 | 42.69% | 121 | 1.04% | 1,584 | 13.58% | 11,663 | -12.24% |
| Ripon | San Joaquin | 1,838 | 74.11% | 624 | 25.16% | 18 | 0.73% | 1,214 | 48.95% | 2,480 | -6.37% |
| Stockton | San Joaquin | 26,305 | 47.45% | 28,644 | 51.67% | 491 | 0.89% | -2,339 | -4.22% | 55,440 | -8.33% |
| Tracy | San Joaquin | 4,575 | 52.23% | 4,088 | 46.67% | 96 | 1.10% | 487 | 5.56% | 8,759 | -14.95% |
| Unincorporated Area | San Joaquin | 23,242 | 57.11% | 16,958 | 41.67% | 494 | 1.21% | 6,284 | 15.44% | 40,694 | -10.66% |
| Arroyo Grande | San Luis Obispo | 3,825 | 60.34% | 2,439 | 38.48% | 75 | 1.18% | 1,386 | 21.86% | 6,339 | -13.51% |
| Atascadero | San Luis Obispo | 5,292 | 61.52% | 3,173 | 36.89% | 137 | 1.59% | 2,119 | 24.63% | 8,602 | -14.60% |
| El Paso de Robles | San Luis Obispo | 3,499 | 65.19% | 1,813 | 33.78% | 55 | 1.02% | 1,686 | 31.41% | 5,367 | -13.63% |
| Grover City | San Luis Obispo | 1,811 | 50.31% | 1,740 | 48.33% | 49 | 1.36% | 71 | 1.97% | 3,600 | -18.47% |
| Morro Bay | San Luis Obispo | 2,340 | 49.25% | 2,328 | 49.00% | 83 | 1.75% | 12 | 0.25% | 4,751 | -16.04% |
| Pismo Beach | San Luis Obispo | 2,092 | 55.58% | 1,607 | 42.69% | 65 | 1.73% | 485 | 12.89% | 3,764 | -12.37% |
| San Luis Obispo | San Luis Obispo | 9,297 | 48.60% | 9,574 | 50.04% | 260 | 1.36% | -277 | -1.45% | 19,131 | -17.58% |
| Unincorporated Area | San Luis Obispo | 18,457 | 57.84% | 12,993 | 40.72% | 459 | 1.44% | 5,464 | 17.12% | 31,909 | -15.69% |
| Atherton | San Mateo | 3,161 | 69.83% | 1,332 | 29.42% | 34 | 0.75% | 1,829 | 40.40% | 4,527 | -5.93% |
| Belmont | San Mateo | 5,435 | 45.98% | 6,227 | 52.68% | 158 | 1.34% | -792 | -6.70% | 11,820 | -20.76% |
| Brisbane | San Mateo | 396 | 28.29% | 961 | 68.64% | 43 | 3.07% | -565 | -40.36% | 1,400 | -20.12% |
| Burlingame | San Mateo | 6,232 | 47.98% | 6,591 | 50.74% | 167 | 1.29% | -359 | -2.76% | 12,990 | -17.93% |
| Colma | San Mateo | 131 | 35.69% | 233 | 63.49% | 3 | 0.82% | -102 | -27.79% | 367 | -12.24% |
| Daly City | San Mateo | 8,147 | 35.38% | 14,693 | 63.80% | 189 | 0.82% | -6,546 | -28.43% | 23,029 | -13.63% |
| East Palo Alto | San Mateo | 501 | 9.77% | 4,502 | 87.76% | 127 | 2.48% | -4,001 | -77.99% | 5,130 | -6.32% |
| Foster City | San Mateo | 6,162 | 51.68% | 5,641 | 47.31% | 120 | 1.01% | 521 | 4.37% | 11,923 | -19.55% |
| Half Moon Bay | San Mateo | 1,685 | 45.27% | 1,971 | 52.96% | 66 | 1.77% | -286 | -7.68% | 3,722 | -22.23% |
| Hillsborough | San Mateo | 4,395 | 72.73% | 1,592 | 26.34% | 56 | 0.93% | 2,803 | 46.38% | 6,043 | -10.18% |
| Menlo Park | San Mateo | 6,299 | 42.39% | 8,371 | 56.34% | 189 | 1.27% | -2,072 | -13.94% | 14,859 | -6.55% |
| Millbrae | San Mateo | 4,452 | 48.68% | 4,594 | 50.23% | 100 | 1.09% | -142 | -1.55% | 9,146 | -19.71% |
| Pacifica | San Mateo | 5,038 | 33.67% | 9,741 | 65.10% | 185 | 1.24% | -4,703 | -31.43% | 14,964 | -19.54% |
| Portola Valley | San Mateo | 1,533 | 55.68% | 1,184 | 43.01% | 36 | 1.31% | 349 | 12.68% | 2,753 | -9.94% |
| Redwood City | San Mateo | 10,309 | 43.24% | 13,162 | 55.21% | 371 | 1.56% | -2,853 | -11.97% | 23,842 | -17.14% |
| San Bruno | San Mateo | 5,613 | 38.83% | 8,682 | 60.05% | 162 | 1.12% | -3,069 | -21.23% | 14,457 | -20.49% |
| San Carlos | San Mateo | 6,861 | 48.75% | 7,035 | 49.98% | 179 | 1.27% | -174 | -1.24% | 14,075 | -22.29% |
| San Mateo | San Mateo | 15,912 | 44.59% | 19,319 | 54.14% | 453 | 1.27% | -3,407 | -9.55% | 35,684 | -17.69% |
| South San Francisco | San Mateo | 5,793 | 33.57% | 11,257 | 65.22% | 209 | 1.21% | -5,464 | -31.66% | 17,259 | -21.33% |
| Woodside | San Mateo | 1,897 | 59.88% | 1,216 | 38.38% | 55 | 1.74% | 681 | 21.50% | 3,168 | -7.05% |
| Unincorporated Area | San Mateo | 9,309 | 39.94% | 13,555 | 58.16% | 442 | 1.90% | -4,246 | -18.22% | 23,306 | -16.05% |
| Carpinteria | Santa Barbara | 2,514 | 50.70% | 2,389 | 48.18% | 56 | 1.13% | 125 | 2.52% | 4,959 | -23.11% |
| Guadalupe | Santa Barbara | 328 | 40.80% | 470 | 58.46% | 6 | 0.75% | -142 | -17.66% | 804 | -18.27% |
| Lompoc | Santa Barbara | 6,722 | 60.84% | 4,167 | 37.71% | 160 | 1.45% | 2,555 | 23.12% | 11,049 | -16.02% |
| Santa Barbara | Santa Barbara | 15,708 | 43.08% | 20,263 | 55.58% | 489 | 1.34% | -4,555 | -12.49% | 36,460 | -16.66% |
| Santa Maria | Santa Barbara | 9,232 | 60.16% | 5,941 | 38.71% | 173 | 1.13% | 3,291 | 21.45% | 15,346 | -20.16% |
| Solvang | Santa Barbara | 1,484 | 70.10% | 615 | 29.05% | 18 | 0.85% | 869 | 41.05% | 2,117 | N/A |
| Unincorporated Area | Santa Barbara | 41,536 | 57.55% | 29,741 | 41.21% | 898 | 1.24% | 11,795 | 16.34% | 72,175 | -17.28% |
| Campbell | Santa Clara | 6,669 | 46.83% | 7,258 | 50.97% | 314 | 2.20% | -589 | -4.14% | 14,241 | -19.34% |
| Cupertino | Santa Clara | 9,886 | 53.12% | 8,362 | 44.93% | 362 | 1.95% | 1,524 | 8.19% | 18,610 | -18.32% |
| Gilroy | Santa Clara | 4,028 | 45.67% | 4,677 | 53.03% | 114 | 1.29% | -649 | -7.36% | 8,819 | -17.17% |
| Los Altos | Santa Clara | 9,259 | 56.55% | 6,836 | 41.75% | 278 | 1.70% | 2,423 | 14.80% | 16,373 | -14.14% |
| Los Altos Hills | Santa Clara | 2,966 | 62.79% | 1,679 | 35.54% | 79 | 1.67% | 1,287 | 27.24% | 4,724 | -11.58% |
| Los Gatos | Santa Clara | 7,746 | 53.41% | 6,475 | 44.64% | 283 | 1.95% | 1,271 | 8.76% | 14,504 | -15.77% |
| Milpitas | Santa Clara | 6,828 | 50.38% | 6,471 | 47.75% | 253 | 1.87% | 357 | 2.63% | 13,552 | -12.21% |
| Monte Sereno | Santa Clara | 1,224 | 62.54% | 681 | 34.80% | 52 | 2.66% | 543 | 27.75% | 1,957 | -15.39% |
| Morgan Hill | Santa Clara | 5,197 | 57.68% | 3,671 | 40.74% | 142 | 1.58% | 1,526 | 16.94% | 9,010 | -12.65% |
| Mountain View | Santa Clara | 10,780 | 40.37% | 15,389 | 57.64% | 531 | 1.99% | -4,609 | -17.26% | 26,700 | -20.17% |
| Palo Alto | Santa Clara | 10,567 | 32.12% | 21,758 | 66.14% | 571 | 1.74% | -11,191 | -34.02% | 32,896 | -12.36% |
| San Jose | Santa Clara | 111,333 | 46.48% | 124,412 | 51.94% | 3,799 | 1.59% | -13,079 | -5.46% | 239,544 | -15.43% |
| Santa Clara | Santa Clara | 15,651 | 44.46% | 18,945 | 53.81% | 609 | 1.73% | -3,294 | -9.36% | 35,205 | -15.52% |
| Saratoga | Santa Clara | 10,799 | 64.49% | 5,709 | 34.10% | 236 | 1.41% | 5,090 | 30.40% | 16,744 | -11.94% |
| Sunnyvale | Santa Clara | 23,633 | 49.12% | 23,604 | 49.06% | 876 | 1.82% | 29 | 0.06% | 48,113 | -17.32% |
| Unincorporated Area | Santa Clara | 17,876 | 44.13% | 21,883 | 54.02% | 750 | 1.85% | -4,007 | -9.89% | 40,509 | -14.56% |
| Capitola | Santa Cruz | 1,772 | 36.28% | 3,024 | 61.92% | 88 | 1.80% | -1,252 | -25.63% | 4,884 | -14.06% |
| Santa Cruz | Santa Cruz | 6,806 | 25.41% | 19,601 | 73.18% | 379 | 1.41% | -12,795 | -47.77% | 26,786 | -12.87% |
| Scotts Valley | Santa Cruz | 2,589 | 57.79% | 1,821 | 40.65% | 70 | 1.56% | 768 | 17.14% | 4,480 | -22.59% |
| Watsonville | Santa Cruz | 2,935 | 40.99% | 4,149 | 57.94% | 77 | 1.08% | -1,214 | -16.95% | 7,161 | -14.42% |
| Unincorporated Area | Santa Cruz | 23,626 | 39.85% | 34,538 | 58.25% | 1,126 | 1.90% | -10,912 | -18.40% | 59,290 | -15.17% |
| Anderson | Shasta | 1,280 | 53.27% | 1,086 | 45.19% | 37 | 1.54% | 194 | 8.07% | 2,403 | -6.59% |
| Redding | Shasta | 14,159 | 60.16% | 8,981 | 38.16% | 397 | 1.69% | 5,178 | 22.00% | 23,537 | -4.16% |
| Unincorporated Area | Shasta | 16,963 | 59.24% | 11,104 | 38.78% | 566 | 1.98% | 5,859 | 20.46% | 28,633 | -6.17% |
| Loyalton | Sierra | 129 | 41.61% | 171 | 55.16% | 10 | 3.23% | -42 | -13.55% | 310 | -10.88% |
| Unincorporated Area | Sierra | 731 | 52.78% | 620 | 44.77% | 34 | 2.45% | 111 | 8.01% | 1,385 | -12.40% |
| Dorris | Siskiyou | 130 | 50.58% | 123 | 47.86% | 4 | 1.56% | 7 | 2.72% | 257 | -14.83% |
| Dunsmuir | Siskiyou | 237 | 36.35% | 400 | 61.35% | 15 | 2.30% | -163 | -25.00% | 652 | -12.11% |
| Etna | Siskiyou | 178 | 57.23% | 126 | 40.51% | 7 | 2.25% | 52 | 16.72% | 311 | -18.21% |
| Fort Jones | Siskiyou | 129 | 52.44% | 112 | 45.53% | 5 | 2.03% | 17 | 6.91% | 246 | -21.72% |
| Montague | Siskiyou | 186 | 50.68% | 172 | 46.87% | 9 | 2.45% | 14 | 3.81% | 367 | -10.61% |
| Mt. Shasta | Siskiyou | 508 | 44.29% | 622 | 54.23% | 17 | 1.48% | -114 | -9.94% | 1,147 | -18.12% |
| Tulelake | Siskiyou | 148 | 67.58% | 67 | 30.59% | 4 | 1.83% | 81 | 36.99% | 219 | -12.43% |
| Weed | Siskiyou | 282 | 30.75% | 616 | 67.18% | 19 | 2.07% | -334 | -36.42% | 917 | -12.34% |
| Yreka | Siskiyou | 1,318 | 52.97% | 1,125 | 45.22% | 45 | 1.81% | 193 | 7.76% | 2,488 | -16.83% |
| Unincorporated Area | Siskiyou | 4,417 | 52.64% | 3,770 | 44.93% | 204 | 2.43% | 647 | 7.71% | 8,391 | -16.91% |
| Unapportioned Absentees | Siskiyou | 1,523 | 54.35% | 1,232 | 43.97% | 47 | 1.68% | 291 | 10.39% | 2,802 | -7.36% |
| Benicia | Solano | 4,254 | 46.78% | 4,720 | 51.91% | 119 | 1.31% | -466 | -5.12% | 9,093 | -13.57% |
| Dixon | Solano | 1,782 | 54.58% | 1,451 | 44.44% | 32 | 0.98% | 331 | 10.14% | 3,265 | -12.21% |
| Fairfield | Solano | 9,850 | 49.98% | 9,571 | 48.56% | 288 | 1.46% | 279 | 1.42% | 19,709 | -15.36% |
| Rio Vista | Solano | 788 | 54.53% | 646 | 44.71% | 11 | 0.76% | 142 | 9.83% | 1,445 | -16.59% |
| Suisun City | Solano | 2,285 | 46.47% | 2,561 | 52.08% | 71 | 1.44% | -276 | -5.61% | 4,917 | -16.30% |
| Vacaville | Solano | 9,553 | 54.53% | 7,742 | 44.19% | 225 | 1.28% | 1,811 | 10.34% | 17,520 | -14.20% |
| Vallejo | Solano | 10,462 | 35.64% | 18,535 | 63.15% | 354 | 1.21% | -8,073 | -27.51% | 29,351 | -14.83% |
| Unincorporated Area | Solano | 3,765 | 57.79% | 2,639 | 40.51% | 111 | 1.70% | 1,126 | 17.28% | 6,515 | -12.24% |
| Unapportioned Absentees | Solano | 7,575 | 53.10% | 6,479 | 45.42% | 212 | 1.49% | 1,096 | 7.68% | 14,266 | -21.13% |
| Cloverdale | Sonoma | 760 | 46.03% | 862 | 52.21% | 29 | 1.76% | -102 | -6.18% | 1,651 | -14.98% |
| Cotati | Sonoma | 606 | 32.37% | 1,241 | 66.29% | 25 | 1.34% | -635 | -33.92% | 1,872 | -11.45% |
| Healdsburg | Sonoma | 1,856 | 46.26% | 2,090 | 52.09% | 66 | 1.65% | -234 | -5.83% | 4,012 | -22.73% |
| Petaluma | Sonoma | 7,112 | 40.49% | 10,211 | 58.13% | 244 | 1.39% | -3,099 | -17.64% | 17,567 | -22.81% |
| Rohnert Park | Sonoma | 5,731 | 44.20% | 7,007 | 54.04% | 228 | 1.76% | -1,276 | -9.84% | 12,966 | -19.90% |
| Santa Rosa | Sonoma | 22,528 | 44.98% | 26,912 | 53.73% | 647 | 1.29% | -4,384 | -8.75% | 50,087 | -16.51% |
| Sebastopol | Sonoma | 1,093 | 35.58% | 1,920 | 62.50% | 59 | 1.92% | -827 | -26.92% | 3,072 | -21.11% |
| Sonoma | Sonoma | 1,792 | 43.46% | 2,287 | 55.47% | 44 | 1.07% | -495 | -12.01% | 4,123 | -20.15% |
| Unincorporated Area | Sonoma | 26,247 | 39.64% | 38,732 | 58.50% | 1,235 | 1.87% | -12,485 | -18.86% | 66,214 | -17.63% |
| Ceres | Stanislaus | 2,054 | 50.57% | 1,967 | 48.42% | 41 | 1.01% | 87 | 2.14% | 4,062 | -13.44% |
| Hughson | Stanislaus | 279 | 50.54% | 269 | 48.73% | 4 | 0.72% | 10 | 1.81% | 552 | -17.16% |
| Modesto | Stanislaus | 16,598 | 51.72% | 15,229 | 47.46% | 262 | 0.82% | 1,369 | 4.27% | 32,089 | -13.39% |
| Newman | Stanislaus | 239 | 36.71% | 408 | 62.67% | 4 | 0.61% | -169 | -25.96% | 651 | -27.23% |
| Oakdale | Stanislaus | 1,263 | 54.35% | 1,042 | 44.84% | 19 | 0.82% | 221 | 9.51% | 2,324 | -9.27% |
| Patterson | Stanislaus | 547 | 46.87% | 608 | 52.10% | 12 | 1.03% | -61 | -5.23% | 1,167 | -16.60% |
| Riverbank | Stanislaus | 592 | 47.32% | 646 | 51.64% | 13 | 1.04% | -54 | -4.32% | 1,251 | -6.76% |
| Turlock | Stanislaus | 4,166 | 55.64% | 3,244 | 43.33% | 77 | 1.03% | 922 | 12.31% | 7,487 | -15.28% |
| Waterford | Stanislaus | 387 | 49.11% | 387 | 49.11% | 14 | 1.78% | 0 | 0.00% | 788 | -16.28% |
| Unincorporated Area | Stanislaus | 9,269 | 52.47% | 8,168 | 46.24% | 228 | 1.29% | 1,101 | 6.23% | 17,665 | -11.62% |
| Unapportioned Absentees | Stanislaus | 16,254 | 55.52% | 12,717 | 43.44% | 305 | 1.04% | 3,537 | 12.08% | 29,276 | -17.60% |
| Live Oak | Sutter | 491 | 59.44% | 321 | 38.86% | 14 | 1.69% | 170 | 20.58% | 826 | -14.08% |
| Yuba City | Sutter | 3,960 | 64.24% | 2,127 | 34.51% | 77 | 1.25% | 1,833 | 29.74% | 6,164 | -6.84% |
| Unincorporated Area | Sutter | 7,173 | 68.18% | 3,227 | 30.67% | 120 | 1.14% | 3,946 | 37.51% | 10,520 | -9.74% |
| Unapportioned Absentees | Sutter | 2,476 | 73.10% | 882 | 26.04% | 29 | 0.86% | 1,594 | 47.06% | 3,387 | -6.84% |
| Corning | Tehama | 821 | 54.62% | 654 | 43.51% | 28 | 1.86% | 167 | 11.11% | 1,503 | -12.39% |
| Red Bluff | Tehama | 1,822 | 52.34% | 1,580 | 45.39% | 79 | 2.27% | 242 | 6.95% | 3,481 | -13.62% |
| Tehama | Tehama | 73 | 50.34% | 72 | 49.66% | 0 | 0.00% | 1 | 0.69% | 145 | -4.41% |
| Unincorporated Area | Tehama | 6,019 | 58.22% | 4,117 | 39.82% | 202 | 1.95% | 1,902 | 18.40% | 10,338 | -10.34% |
| Unapportioned Absentees | Tehama | 1,119 | 56.89% | 790 | 40.16% | 58 | 2.95% | 329 | 16.73% | 1,967 | -24.05% |
| Unincorporated Area | Trinity | 3,267 | 54.67% | 2,518 | 42.14% | 191 | 3.20% | 749 | 12.53% | 5,976 | -9.81% |
| Dinuba | Tulare | 1,375 | 53.23% | 1,174 | 45.45% | 34 | 1.32% | 201 | 7.78% | 2,583 | -8.52% |
| Exeter | Tulare | 1,092 | 59.25% | 727 | 39.45% | 24 | 1.30% | 365 | 19.80% | 1,843 | -13.83% |
| Farmersville | Tulare | 360 | 38.22% | 563 | 59.77% | 19 | 2.02% | -203 | -21.55% | 942 | -8.84% |
| Lindsay | Tulare | 738 | 53.17% | 632 | 45.53% | 18 | 1.30% | 106 | 7.64% | 1,388 | -12.64% |
| Porterville | Tulare | 3,466 | 58.74% | 2,351 | 39.84% | 84 | 1.42% | 1,115 | 18.90% | 5,901 | -7.81% |
| Tulare | Tulare | 3,357 | 50.65% | 3,212 | 48.46% | 59 | 0.89% | 145 | 2.19% | 6,628 | -6.61% |
| Visalia | Tulare | 13,501 | 62.62% | 7,817 | 36.26% | 243 | 1.13% | 5,684 | 26.36% | 21,561 | -9.53% |
| Woodlake | Tulare | 329 | 45.07% | 392 | 53.70% | 9 | 1.23% | -63 | -8.63% | 730 | -12.14% |
| Unincorporated Area | Tulare | 16,359 | 59.70% | 10,648 | 38.86% | 396 | 1.45% | 5,711 | 20.84% | 27,403 | -9.18% |
| Unapportioned Absentees | Tulare | 6,314 | 65.25% | 3,195 | 33.02% | 168 | 1.74% | 3,119 | 32.23% | 9,677 | -6.69% |
| Sonora | Tuolumne | 638 | 49.34% | 636 | 49.19% | 19 | 1.47% | 2 | 0.15% | 1,293 | -4.67% |
| Unincorporated Area | Tuolumne | 10,008 | 54.33% | 8,081 | 43.87% | 333 | 1.81% | 1,927 | 10.46% | 18,422 | -8.46% |
| Camarillo | Ventura | 14,817 | 65.02% | 7,768 | 34.09% | 204 | 0.90% | 7,049 | 30.93% | 22,789 | -11.99% |
| Fillmore | Ventura | 1,781 | 55.62% | 1,384 | 43.22% | 37 | 1.16% | 397 | 12.40% | 3,202 | -18.67% |
| Moorpark | Ventura | 5,858 | 68.06% | 2,660 | 30.91% | 89 | 1.03% | 3,198 | 37.16% | 8,607 | -9.42% |
| Ojai | Ventura | 1,818 | 52.86% | 1,582 | 46.00% | 39 | 1.13% | 236 | 6.86% | 3,439 | -15.87% |
| Oxnard | Ventura | 17,135 | 51.69% | 15,644 | 47.19% | 371 | 1.12% | 1,491 | 4.50% | 33,150 | -15.53% |
| Port Hueneme | Ventura | 3,059 | 55.80% | 2,362 | 43.09% | 61 | 1.11% | 697 | 12.71% | 5,482 | -19.93% |
| Ventura | Ventura | 22,891 | 56.75% | 16,937 | 41.99% | 508 | 1.26% | 5,954 | 14.76% | 40,336 | -15.45% |
| Santa Paula | Ventura | 3,604 | 51.12% | 3,371 | 47.82% | 75 | 1.06% | 233 | 3.30% | 7,050 | -15.83% |
| Simi Valley | Ventura | 25,177 | 68.78% | 10,998 | 30.05% | 429 | 1.17% | 14,179 | 38.74% | 36,604 | -15.50% |
| Thousand Oaks | Ventura | 31,923 | 67.79% | 14,648 | 31.11% | 517 | 1.10% | 17,275 | 36.69% | 47,088 | -14.40% |
| Unincorporated Area | Ventura | 19,541 | 61.61% | 11,711 | 36.92% | 464 | 1.46% | 7,830 | 24.69% | 31,716 | -14.55% |
| Davis | Yolo | 7,147 | 31.95% | 14,955 | 66.86% | 265 | 1.18% | -7,808 | -34.91% | 22,367 | -12.17% |
| West Sacramento | Yolo | 3,499 | 37.96% | 5,624 | 61.02% | 94 | 1.02% | -2,125 | -23.06% | 9,217 | N/A |
| Winters | Yolo | 630 | 52.68% | 557 | 46.57% | 9 | 0.75% | 73 | 6.10% | 1,196 | -2.22% |
| Woodland | Yolo | 7,305 | 54.98% | 5,874 | 44.21% | 107 | 0.81% | 1,431 | 10.77% | 13,286 | -10.29% |
| Unincorporated Area | Yolo | 3,777 | 51.72% | 3,419 | 46.82% | 107 | 1.47% | 358 | 4.90% | 7,303 | 0.71% |
| Marysville | Yuba | 2,274 | 62.52% | 1,334 | 36.68% | 29 | 0.80% | 940 | 25.85% | 3,637 | -1.12% |
| Wheatland | Yuba | 332 | 57.84% | 234 | 40.77% | 8 | 1.39% | 98 | 17.07% | 574 | -6.77% |
| Unincorporated Area | Yuba | 6,331 | 61.16% | 3,876 | 37.44% | 145 | 1.40% | 2,455 | 23.72% | 10,352 | -4.18% |
| Totals (Note: Statewide candidate vote percentages and the total vote number differ here due to discrepancies in Los Angeles County vote totals, and because California's Supplement to Statement of Vote does not count write in votes as part of the city totals.) | | 5,126,299 | 51.10% | 4,777,278 | 47.62% | 128,437 | 1.28% | 349,021 | 3.48% | 10,032,014 | -12.77% |

==== Cities & Unincorporated Areas that flipped from Republican to Democratic ====
- Alameda (Alameda)
- Newark (Alameda)
- San Leandro (Alameda)
- Unincorporated Area (Alameda)
- Chico (Butte)
- Antioch (Contra Costa)
- Concord (Contra Costa)
- Hercules (Contra Costa)
- Martinez (Contra Costa)
- Pinole (Contra Costa)
- Pleasant Hill (Contra Costa)
- Unincorporated Area (Contra Costa)
- Crescent City (Del Norte)
- Fowler (Fresno)
- Kerman (Fresno)
- Selma (Fresno)
- Eureka (Humboldt)
- Unapportioned Absentees (Humboldt)
- Unincorporated Area (Humboldt)
- Westmorland (Imperial)
- Arvin (Kern)
- Avenal (Kings)
- Baldwin Park (Los Angeles)
- Bell Gardens (Los Angeles)
- Bell (Los Angeles)
- Cudahy (Los Angeles)
- El Monte (Los Angeles)
- Hawaiian Gardens (Los Angeles)
- Hawthorne (Los Angeles)
- Huntington Park (Los Angeles)
- La Puente (Los Angeles)
- Maywood (Los Angeles)
- Monterey Park (Los Angeles)
- Norwalk (Los Angeles)
- Paramount (Los Angeles)
- Pasadena (Los Angeles)
- Pomona (Los Angeles)
- Rosemead (Los Angeles)
- San Fernando (Los Angeles)
- Santa Fe Springs (Los Angeles)
- South Gate (Los Angeles)
- Unincorporated Area (Los Angeles)
- Madera (Madera)
- Larkspur (Marin)
- San Rafael (Marin)
- Tiburon (Marin)
- Fort Bragg (Mendocino)
- Point Arena (Mendocino)
- Ukiah (Mendocino)
- Willits (Mendocino)
- Unapportioned Absentees (Mendocino)
- Unincorporated Area (Mendocino)
- Los Banos (Merced)
- Merced (Merced)
- Carmel-by-the-Sea (Monterey)
- Gonzales (Monterey)
- Greenfield (Monterey)
- Monterey (Monterey)
- Unapportioned Absentees (Monterey)
- Calistoga (Napa)
- Napa (Napa)
- Colfax (Placer)
- Indio (Riverside)
- Hollister (San Benito)
- San Juan Bautista (San Benito)
- Needles (San Bernardino)
- Rialto (San Bernardino)
- San Bernardino (San Bernardino)
- National City (San Diego)
- Stockton (San Joaquin)
- San Luis Obispo (San Luis Obispo)
- Belmont (San Mateo)
- Burlingame (San Mateo)
- Half Moon Bay (San Mateo)
- Millbrae (San Mateo)
- Redwood City (San Mateo)
- San Carlos (San Mateo)
- San Mateo (San Mateo)
- Guadalupe (Santa Barbara)
- Santa Barbara (Santa Barbara)
- Campbell (Santa Clara)
- Gilroy (Santa Clara)
- Mountain View (Santa Clara)
- San Jose (Santa Clara)
- Santa Clara (Santa Clara)
- Unincorporated Area (Santa Clara)
- Mt. Shasta (Siskiyou)
- Benicia (Solano)
- Suisun City (Solano)
- Cloverdale (Sonoma)
- Healdsburg (Sonoma)
- Petaluma (Sonoma)
- Rohnert Park (Sonoma)
- Santa Rosa (Sonoma)
- Sonoma (Sonoma)
- Newman (Stanislaus)
- Patterson (Stanislaus)
- Riverbank (Stanislaus)
- Waterford (Stanislaus) - Tie in 1988
- Woodlake (Tulare)

=== By congressional district ===
Bush won 23 of the 45 congressional districts, including five held by Democrats.

| District | Bush | Dukakis | Representative |
|---|---|---|---|
| 1st | 43.9% | 56.1% | Douglas H. Bosco |
| 2nd | 59.0% | 41.0% | Wally Herger |
| 3rd | 50.4% | 49.6% | Bob Matsui |
| 4th | 51.5% | 48.5% | Vic Fazio |
| 5th | 28.0% | 72.0% | Nancy Pelosi |
| 6th | 35.2% | 64.8% | Barbara Boxer |
| 7th | 46.1% | 53.9% | George Miller |
| 8th | 29.4% | 70.6% | Ron Dellums |
| 9th | 42.4% | 57.6% | Pete Stark |
| 10th | 44.2% | 55.8% | Don Edwards |
| 11th | 41.3% | 58.7% | Tom Lantos |
| 12th | 50.1% | 49.9% | Tom Campbell |
| 13th | 49.8% | 50.2% | Norman Mineta |
| 14th | 59.8% | 40.2% | Norman D. Shumway |
| 15th | 52.8% | 47.2% | Tony Coelho |
| 16th | 45.0% | 55.0% | Leon Panetta |
| 17th | 59.4% | 40.6% | Chip Pashayan |
| 18th | 46.5% | 53.5% | Richard Lehman |
| 19th | 54.7% | 45.3% | Bob Lagomarsino |
| 20th | 65.3% | 34.7% | Bill Thomas |
| 21st | 65.1% | 34.9% | Elton Gallegly |
| 22nd | 64.7% | 35.3% | Carlos Moorhead |
| 23rd | 43.5% | 56.5% | Anthony Beilenson |
| 24th | 34.3% | 65.7% | Henry Waxman |
| 25th | 32.1% | 67.9% | Edward Roybal |
| 26th | 44.1% | 55.9% | Howard Berman |
| 27th | 44.8% | 55.2% | Mel Levine |
| 28th | 26.4% | 73.6% | Julian Dixon |
| 29th | 19.3% | 80.7% | Augustus Hawkins |
| 30th | 46.6% | 53.4% | Matthew Martinez |
| 31st | 34.8% | 65.2% | Mervyn Dymally |
| 32nd | 50.4% | 49.6% | Glenn Anderson |
| 33rd | 63.1% | 36.9% | David Dreier |
| 34th | 49.1% | 50.9% | Ed Torres |
| 35th | 66.2% | 33.8% | Jerry Lewis |
| 36th | 52.0% | 48.0% | George Brown |
| 37th | 61.5% | 38.5% | Al McCandless |
| 38th | 61.7% | 38.3% | Bob Dornan |
| 39th | 71.5% | 28.5% | William Dannemeyer |
| 40th | 68.7% | 31.3% | Christopher Cox |
| 41st | 59.1% | 40.9% | Bill Lowery |
| 42nd | 65.7% | 34.3% | Dana Rohrabacher |
| 43rd | 68.8% | 31.2% | Ron Packard |
| 44th | 47.9% | 52.1% | Jim Bates |
| 45th | 66.8% | 33.2% | Duncan Hunter |

== Analysis ==
California voted Republican in 1988 for the 9th time out of 10 elections from 1952 on, confirming its status as a Republican electoral bulwark during this period. However, George H. W. Bush won California by only 3.57% even as he won nationally by 7.72%; and Florida displaced it as the state providing the Republican with his biggest raw-vote margin in the nation. Signs of the phenomena that would come to make California a 'Blue Wall' state from 1992 on emerged in this election; for the first time since 1916, Los Angeles County voted for the loser of the national election. Bush was also nearly swept out of the Bay Area, losing populous former Republican strongholds such as Santa Clara, San Mateo, Sonoma, and Marin Counties (as well as Santa Cruz County, the northernmost Central Coast county). While Bush continued to do well in San Diego, Orange, and Ventura Counties (and, to a lesser extent, Santa Barbara, San Luis Obispo, and Monterey Counties, as well as in relatively thinly populated Napa County), this represented a significant erosion of the Republican Party's traditional base along the length of California's coast. By 2016 2020 and 2024, this process was complete, as every coastal county in the state save Del Norte voted Democratic three elections in a row.

On the other hand, in contrast to the 1976, 1968, 1960, and 1948 elections in California, all of which had been close (and which had been won by the Democrat in 1948), Dukakis carried little of inland California, which had traditionally been the Democratic base in the state. Counties that had voted Democratic in all four of those elections, but voted Republican in 1988, included Sacramento, Fresno, Placer, Merced, Shasta, Madera, Amador, Lassen, Plumas, Trinity, and Sierra Counties. Apart from Sacramento, Fresno, and Merced Counties, these have continued to remain as Republican strongholds in the state even as overall it has become increasingly blue in the 21st century. Comparing 1988 directly with what at the time was the most recent close election in California, 1976, Dukakis carried only nine of the 27 counties Carter carried in the state. Three of these (Shasta, Plumas, and Sierra) had even voted for McGovern in the disastrous Democratic defeat of 1972.
