= Crowned republic =

Informal term for where a monarch's role is seen as almost entirely ceremonial

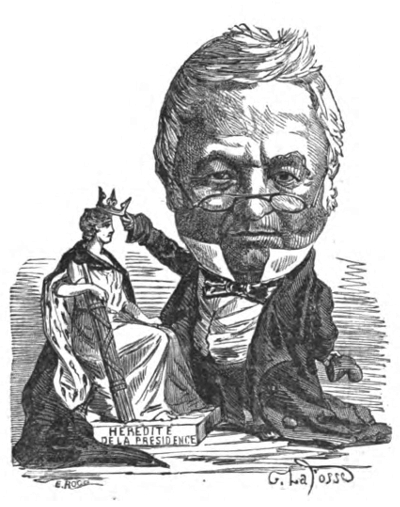
A 1871 caricature of the French president Adolphe Thiers by Touchatout, alluding to his 1830s defense of the July Monarchy as a “hereditary presidency”. Thiers symbolically replaces the Phrygian cap, a symbol of the French Revolution and especially of jacobinism, with a crown on a personification of Liberty commonly used as an allegory of the French Republic.

A crowned republic, also known as a monarchical republic, is a system of monarchy where the monarch's role is almost entirely ceremonial and where nearly all of the royal prerogatives are exercised in such a way that the monarch personally has little power over executive and constitutional issues. The term "crowned republic" has been used by a small number of authors (below) to informally describe governments such as Australia and the United Kingdom, although these countries are usually classed as constitutional monarchies. The term may also refer to historical republics that had a doge as their head of state, most particularly Venice and Genoa, and is sometimes used to describe the current Republic of San Marino.

The terms monarchical republic and presidential monarchism have also been used to refer to some contemporary presidential republics that have undergone a partial 're-monarchisation' or to presidents who act as "disguised monarchs", especially in Africa.

== History ==
As an informal term, "crowned republic" lacks any set definition as to its meaning, and the precise difference between a constitutional monarchy and a "crowned republic" remains vague. Different individuals have described various states as crowned republics for varied reasons. For example, James Bryce wrote in 1921:

By Monarchy I understand the thing not the Name i.e. not any State the head of which is called King or Emperor, but one in which the personal will of the monarch is constantly effective, and in the last resort predominant, factor of government. Thus, while such a monarchy as that of Norway is really a Crowned Republic, and indeed a democratic republic, monarchy was in Russia before 1917, and in Turkey before 1905, and to a less degree in Germany and the Austro-Hungarian Monarchy until 1918, an appreciable force in the conduct of affairs.

In 1763, John Adams argued that the British Empire was a form of republic:

[T]he British constitution is much more like a republic than an empire. They define a republic to be a government of laws, and not of men. If this definition be just, the British constitution is nothing more nor less than a republic, in which the king is first magistrate. This office being hereditary, and being possessed of such ample and splendid prerogatives, is no objection to the government’s being a republic, as long as it is bound by fixed laws, which the people have a voice in making, and a right to defend. An empire is a despotism, and an emperor a despot, bound by no law or limitation but his own will; it is a stretch of tyranny beyond absolute monarchy.

The Australian Republic Advisory Committee described the country as a "crowned republic" and stated it was "a state in which sovereignty resides in its people, and in which all public offices, except that at the very apex of the system, are filled by persons deriving their authority directly or indirectly from the people" so "it may be appropriate to regard Australia as a crowned republic". Australian founding father Richard Chaffey Baker did not use the term "crowned republic" but has been identified as one of the first to articulate this view. He "proudly proclaimed his loyalty to the Queen in the same breath as he declared himself a republican", holding that republicanism did not solely revolve around absence of monarchy.

H. G. Wells (1866–1946) used the term in his book A Short History of the World to describe the United Kingdom, as did Alfred, Lord Tennyson in 1873 in an epilogue to Idylls of the King. In referring to the UK as a crowned republic, the Australian Republic Advisory Committee stated "Britain has not been a constitutional monarchy since probably the late 18th century."

In the Kingdom of Greece, the term Βασιλευομένη Δημοκρατία (Vasilevoméni Dimokratía, literally crowned democracy or crowned republic) became popular after the 23 October 1862 Revolution, which resulted in the introduction of the 1864 constitution. The Constitution of 1952 enshrined the concept into law by declaring the form of government that of a Crowned Republic. This is sometimes translated as "Crowned Democracy".

== Monarchical republic of Queen Elizabeth I ==
In 1987, Patrick Collinson argued that the government of Elizabethan England (1558–1603) can be described as a "monarchical republic", because there were serious limits on Queen Elizabeth I's independent authority, and some privy councillors sponsored a scheme to allow a brief interregnum if the queen should be killed by her Catholic enemies. Many historians have accepted and expanded upon this theory. However, in 2019, Jonathan McGovern suggested that this formulation is an exaggeration, and has been treated too seriously by subsequent historians.

== Presidential monarchism in Africa ==
Awasom and others have referred to many presidents in Africa as "presidential monarchs", owing to their longevity. African presidents have used autocracy to perpetuate themselves in power, sometimes grooming a successor to preserve their regimes. Their leadership style was personalist and neopatrimonial, and they disregarded the separation of powers, facing little accountability. However, other than Jean-Bédel Bokassa, few leaders have taken up the title of monarch. By the turn of the 21st century, over 25 presidents had been in power for over 20 years, and Africa was home to 7 of the 10 longest serving presidents in the world.

While some Europeans claimed to have groomed their colonies for democracy, this was not the case, and the colonial project for Africa was clearly to “exploit the physical, human, and economic resources of Africa to benefit the colonising nation”, not to "export democracy" with liberal democratic constitutions hastily introduced in the last decade of colonialism. The colonial governor general was effectively an oppressive dictator, and this informed local nationalist leaders. Decolonisation, from around 1960 to 1980, saw colonial powers transfer authoritarian states to first-generation African leaders.

The new elite found multi-party state building challenging, and largely transitioned to one-party states. Francophone states in West Africa had already moved to one-party states prior to independence, with Ghana's Nkrumah copying this, establishing himself as president for life, later replicated by other English-speaking countries. The disenchantment of civilian politics led to various coups, an average of 25 per decade between 1960 and 2000, resulting in militaristic presidential monarchs alongside civilian ones. In the Cold War, the West propped up autocrats while the Soviet Union supported one-party Marxist-Leninist states.

The collapse of the Soviet Union in 1989 saw a wave of democratisation. The West implemented a new global neoliberal agenda tying World Bank and International Monetary Fund aid to compliance with multiparty elections and political freedoms. This achieved much popular support and various countries introduced multi-party constitutions, often crucially with two term limits despite indifference from Western countries. In light of this, some leaders attempted to circumvent them or negotiate third terms, sometimes successfully, while others abolished term limits entirely.

== See also ==
- Popular monarchy
- Maritime republics
- First Polish Republic with monarch election, de facto ruled by szlachta
