= 1992 U.S. Taxpayers National Convention =

- 1992 presidential election
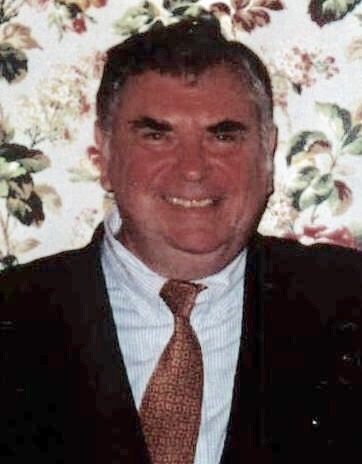
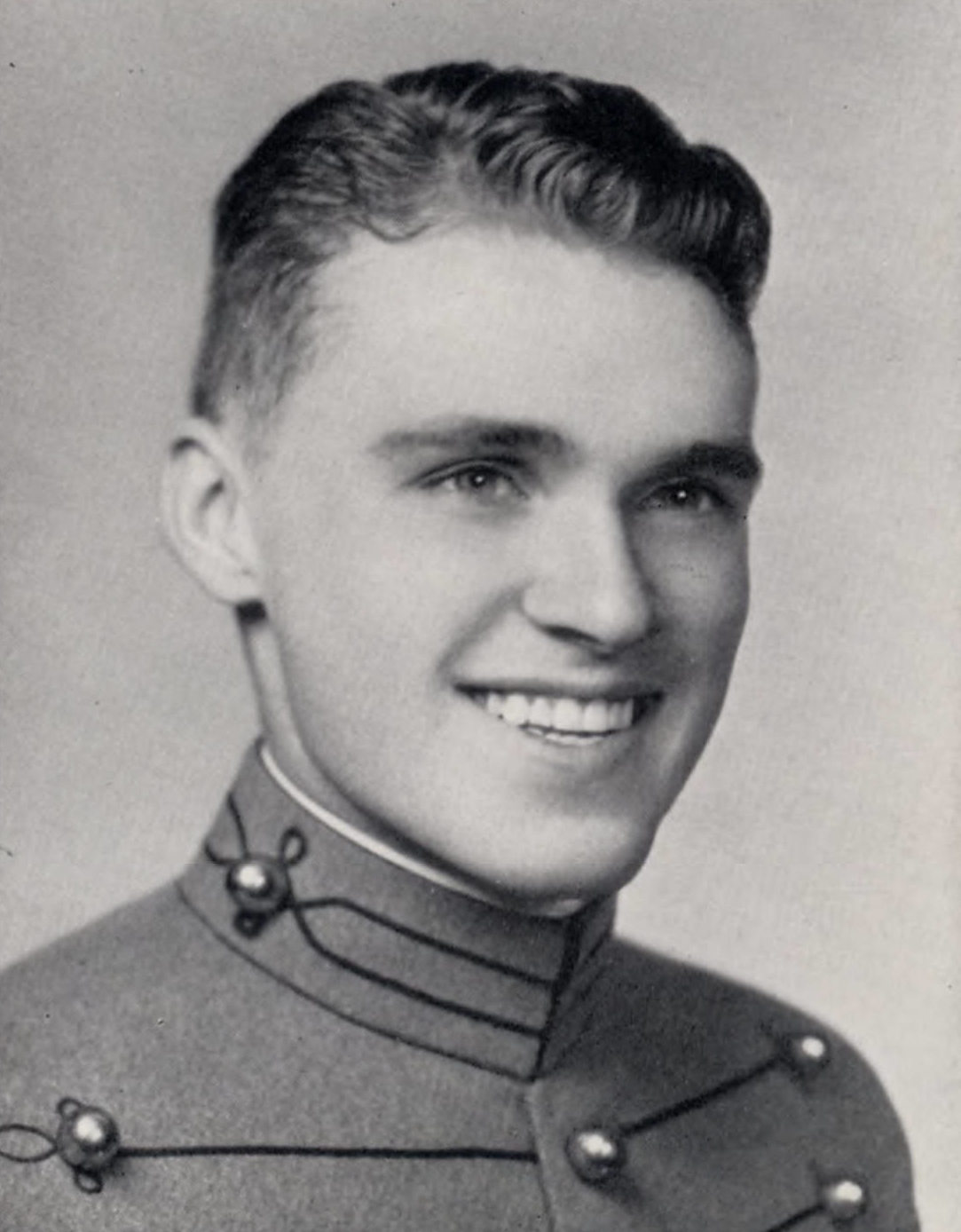
- Nominees (Phillips and Knight)

Convention
- Date(s): September 4–5, 1992
- City: New Orleans, Louisiana

Candidates
- Presidential nominee: Howard Phillips of Virginia
- Vice-presidential nominee: Albion W. Knight Jr. of Maryland
- Results (president): H. Phillips: 264 (97.8%); B. Gritz: 4 (1.5.%); E. Mecham: 1 (0.4%)
- Ballots: 1

The 1992 U.S. Taxpayers Convention was held September 4–5, 1992, in New Orleans, Louisiana. It saw the newly founded U.S. Taxpayers Party (which is today known as the "Constitution Party") nominate Howard Phillips for president and Albion W. Knight Jr. for vice president.

== Background ==
In advance of its convention, the party provisionally nominated Howard Phillips so that it would be able to have a provisional nominee needed to seek ballot access in many states. While initially a temporary nomination, it was ultimately made permanent at the party's national convention after no major figures made themselves candidates for the party's nomination. Pat Buchanan, who the party was interested in nominating, ultimately endorsed President George H. W. Bush at the 1992 Republican National Convention.

In June 2 California primary for the American Independent Party, Phillips had received 15,456 votes. On August 30, the American Independent Party voted to affiliate itself with the national U.S. Taxpayers Party, an affiliation which would ultimately continued until 2008.

== Logistics ==
The convention was the inaugural presidential nominating convention of the party. The convention was held September 4–5 at a hotel ballroom in New Orleans, Louisiana.

The convention was attended by delegates from thirty-two states as well as Washington, D.C.

Among those involved in the convention was Eileen Schaefer, the 1980 vice presidential nominee of the American Independent Party.

== Nomination ==
The party nominated Howard Phillips of Virginia for president and Albion W. Knight Jr. of Maryland for vice president. Phillips was nominated in a single round of balloting, while Knight was nominated by acclamation.

1992 U.S. Taxpayers Party National Convention presidential vote
Candidate	Votes	Percentage
Howard Phillips	264	97.78%
Bo Gritz	4	1.48%
Evan Mecham	1	0.37%
Totals	269	100%

== Platform ==
Mark Weaver, the campaign coordinator and assistant treasurer of the party, described the party as being, "concerned Americans committed to constitutional and biblical standards of government."

The top priorities of the party platform were to abolish the Internal Revenue Service (IRS) and cutting $500 billion out of the $1.5 trillion national budget (restoring spending levels to the amount spent in 1987.

The platform also positioned the party as standing in opposition to abortion rights, women serving in combat, the United Nations, federal day care subsidies, federal funding for AIDS education, gun control, pensions for elected officials, and federal regulatory commissions. It additionally opposed funding of the National Endowment for the Arts and PBS.
