= Albion Knight (play) =

Early modern play

Albion Knight is a Tudor political interlude published circa 1566. Only a fragment of the text is extant, consisting of 408 lines out of a presumed original total of around 1,500 lines.

== Synopsis ==
The play's allegorical characters are reminiscent of the morality play tradition: Albion, Dame Plenty, Division, Double Device, Injury, Justice, Old Debate, Maintenance, Peace, Principality and Rest. Injury and Division stir up trouble by suggesting that law and justice are not administered impartially in England. They hatch a plot to sow further discord by sending false or inflammatory messages to various characters.

== Date of composition ==
In 1913, Madeleine Hope Dodds argued that Albion Knight was written circa 1537 or 1538 in response to the Pilgrimage of Grace. In 1918, Gwen Ann Jones suggested that the poem was of Elizabethan composition, having been written in 1566. In 2026, Jonathan McGovern argued that the poem was more likely written circa 1533 and is a pre-Reformation text.

== Editions ==
A modern-spelling edition was published by John S. Farmer in 1906. Earlier original-spelling editions had appeared in 1844 and 1909.
