= Albion W. Knight =

American bishop

The Right Reverend Albion W. Knight D.D.
- Coadjutor Bishop of New Jersey
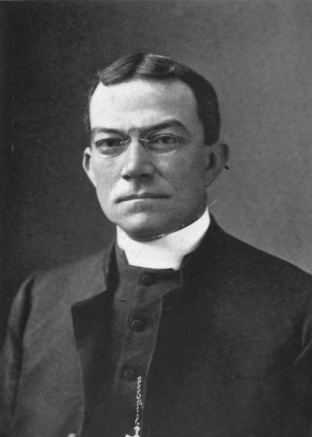
- Church: Episcopal Church
- Diocese: New Jersey
- Elected: October 9, 1923
- In office: 1923–1936
- Previous posts: Bishop of Cuba (1905-1913); Chancellor of the University of the South (1913-1922)

Orders
- Ordination: 1883 by John F. Young
- Consecration: December 21, 1904 by Daniel S. Tuttle

Personal details
- Born: August 24, 1859 White Springs, Florida, United States
- Died: June 9, 1936 (aged 76)
- Buried: Evergreen Cemetery (Jacksonville, Florida)
- Denomination: Anglican
- Parents: George Augustine Knight & Martha Demere
- Spouse: Elise Nicoll Hallowes; Miriam Powell Yates

Albion Williamson Knight (August 24, 1859 - June 9, 1936) was a bishop in the Episcopal Church, serving in Cuba and the Episcopal Diocese of New Jersey.

== History ==
He was born in White Springs, Florida and educated at the University of the South. Following ministry in parishes in Georgia and Florida, he was consecrated in 1904 for missionary work in Cuba. He resigned this jurisdiction in 1913 to serve as Bishop Coadjutor of New Jersey, retiring in 1935.

He was the son of George Augustine Knight (1830-1877), a merchant, and his wife Martha née Demere (1824-1862). He married first Elise Nichol Hallowes (1853-1918) and had a daughter Ada Nicoll Knight (1893- ) and a son Albion Williamson Knight (1891-1953); his second marriage was to Miriam Yates, née Powell (1879-1958).

His grandson, Brigadier General Albion W. Knight, Jr. (1924-2012), also became a priest in the Episcopal Church, before joining the United Episcopal Church of North America and becoming its presiding bishop.
