= Herbert G. Lewin =

American politician

Herbert G. Lewin (June 22, 1914 – March 18, 2010) was the Peace and Freedom Party nominee for President of the United States in the 1988 United States presidential election. His running mate was Vikki Murdock from California. They won 10,370 votes, 9,953 of them from New Jersey. Lewin was a union activist for the United Electrical, Radio and Machine Workers of America.

He had previously run for Governor of Pennsylvania in 1950 as the candidate of the Militant Worker Party coming in last place with 841 votes versus the 1.7 million of John S. Fine. Lewin ran in 1956 for United States Senator from Pennsylvania winning 2,640 votes against the 2.2 million votes for Joseph S. Clark.

After his retirement, Lewin, a machinist with Westinghouse Electric Corporation's Lester (PA) Steam Turbine Division, served as a substitute teacher in Philadelphia's vocational public high schools.

He died on March 18, 2010, at the age of 95 from heart failure.

Party political offices
Preceded by —	Peace and Freedom nominee for President of the United States; 1988	Succeeded by Ronald Daniels
