= Ronald Daniels (politician) =

American politician

Ronald Daniels (born 1942 or 1943) is a professor and politician and was a third-party candidate (Peace and Freedom Party) for President of the United States in the 1992 U.S. presidential election in California. His running mate was Asiba Tupahache.

He was on the ballot in Iowa and Utah as the candidate of his own Campaign for a New Tomorrow Party, the Labour & Farm Party of Wisconsin, write-ins as North Central Citizens' League/Progressive Party-1924, CCRPP, or independent in Minnesota, North Dakota, and Michigan as well as some in Iowa and Wisconsin, and in New Jersey as the Independent Party. The Daniels-Tupahache ticket received 27,949 votes for 0.03% of the national vote according to the published Clerk of the House of Representatives, Associated Press, Reuters, and National League of Women Voters totals, and probably right around 28,000 with scattered write-in votes across the country taken into account. The ticket received some daily and weekly newspaper endorsements as well as being endorsed by a number of campus, labor, or political publications, being among the six tickets to receive the endorsements of general-interest daily and weekly newspapers which did in 1992 including the Reform (Perot), Libertarian (Marrou), and US Taxpayers (Phillips) tickets in addition to Bush and Clinton.

Daniels was previously the Executive Director of the Center for Constitutional Rights and the Executive Director of Jesse Jackson's National Rainbow Coalition, and worked on Jackson's 1984 presidential campaign and was then Deputy Campaign Manager for Jackson's 1988 presidential campaign.

Daniels served as a Distinguished Lecturer in Political Science from 2007–2018 at CUNY's York College in Jamaica, Queens, and appears periodically on television and radio public affairs programs such as Hannity & Colmes.

== Notes ==
Party political offices
Preceded by Herbert G. Lewin	Peace and Freedom nominee for President of the United States; 1992	Succeeded by Marsha Feinland
