= Asiba Tupahache =

American politician

- Political party: Peace and Freedom Party

Asiba Tupahache is a Matinecoc Nation Native American activist from New York and was a vice presidential candidate in the 1992 election on Peace and Freedom Party ticket, accompanying Ronald Daniels. Born in Long Island, New York, she is a former public school teacher, an advocate of homeschooling, and a mother of two. She authored the book Taking Another Look and its accompanying audiocassette, and is the editor and publisher of The Spirit of January Reflection, formerly titled The Spirit of January Monthly.

== Bibliography ==
- Taking Another Look (1986)

Preceded by Vikki Murdock	Peace and Freedom nominee for Vice President of the United States; 1992	Succeeded by Kate McClatchy
