= Albion W. Knight Jr. =

American politician

Albion Knight

Personal details
- Born: Albion Williamson Knight Jr. June 1, 1924 Jacksonville, Florida, U.S.
- Died: May 22, 2012 (aged 87) Gaithersburg, Maryland, U.S.
- Party: Constitution
- Education: United States Military Academy; University of Illinois, Urbana- Champaign; American University

Albion Williamson Knight Jr. (June 1, 1924 – May 22, 2012) was the second Archbishop of the United Episcopal Church of North America (UECNA) from 1989 until his resignation in 1992. During his tenure, Knight more than tripled the number of parishes belonging to the church. He later helped found the Church of England (Continuing), a conservative church in England that opposes both the growth of Anglo-Catholic practices and doctrines and the more liberal religious and social stance of the Church of England.

== Personal life ==
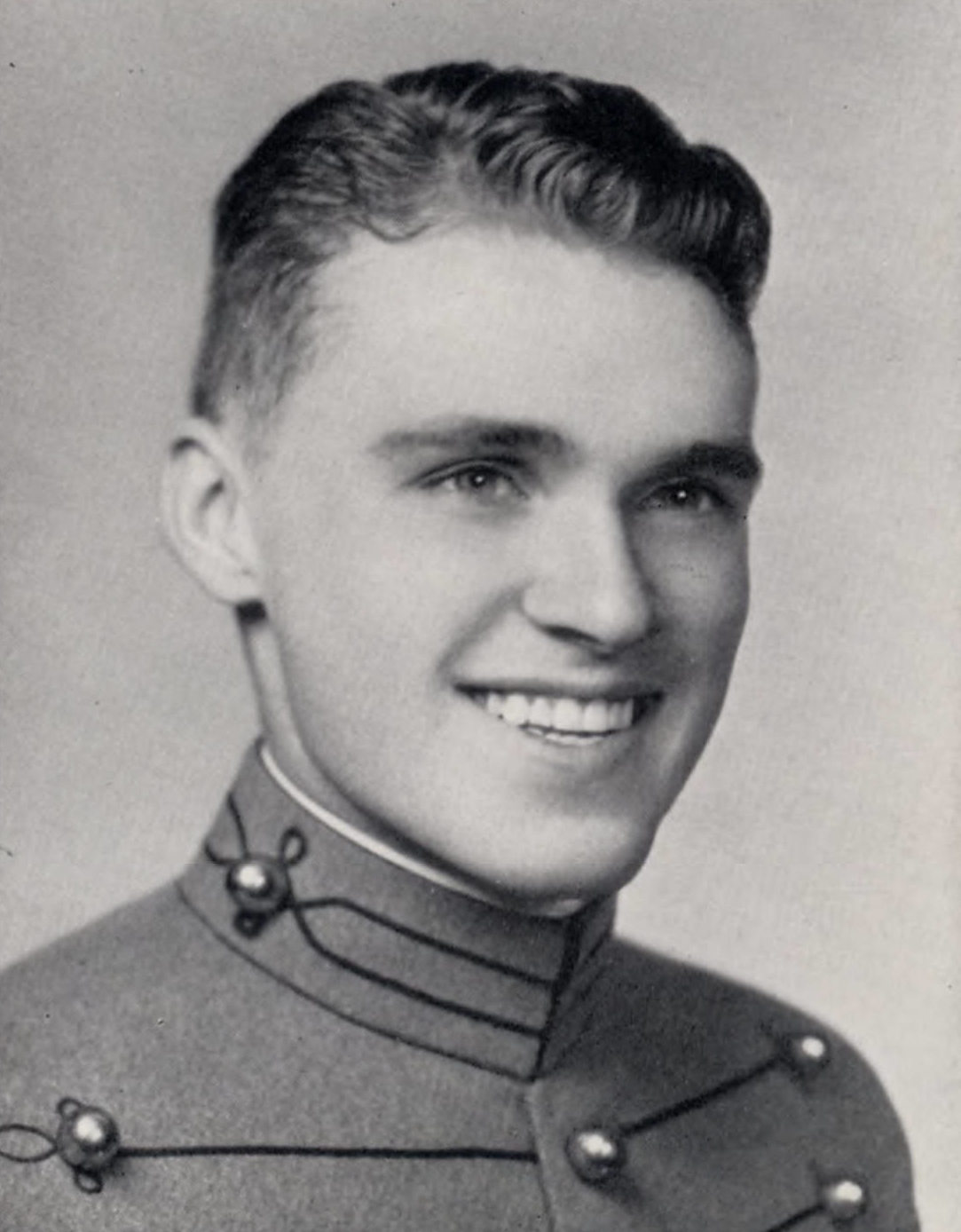
Knight Jr. as a United States Military Academy cadet c. 1945

Knight was born on June 1, 1924 in Jacksonville, Florida to Albion Williamson Knight (1891–1953) and Anna Marion née Russell (1893–1966). He was the grandson of Albion W. Knight (1859–1936), the former Bishop of Cuba in the Episcopal Church (TEC) and subsequently Bishop Coadjutor of New Jersey.

He graduated from the U.S. Military Academy in 1945, and retired from the Army in 1973 as a Brigadier General. He earned master's degrees from the University of Illinois and American University.

Knight died on May 22, 2012 at his home in Gaithersburg, Maryland.

== Career ==
Knight was ordained a deacon in TEC in 1964 and as a priest in 1965. He joined the UECNA in late 1983 and became the bishop of its Eastern diocese in 1984 before being elected its Archbishop in 1985. He was consecrated in Bethesda, Maryland on June 2, 1984 by Charles D. D. Doren, the first bishop in the Continuing Anglican movement and first Archbishop of the UECNA.

During his tenure, Knight sponsored the creation of a denominational seminary, reorganized the church into missionary districts, and embarked on a revision of the UECNA Constitution and Canons, which was initially voted on in 1991. The revision changed the title of the senior bishop in the UECNA to Presiding Bishop.

He resigned in 1992 to pursue his political aspiration, and was succeeded as Presiding Bishop by John Cyrus Gramley (1931–1996). Knight was the vice-presidential candidate of the U.S. Taxpayers Party in the 1992 presidential election.

Religious titles
Preceded by Charles Doren	Presiding Bishop of the United Episcopal Church of North America; 1989–1992	Succeeded by John Gramley
Party political offices
First	Constitution nominee for Vice President of the United States; 1992	Succeeded by Herb Titus
