= Jonathan McGovern (historian) =

English historian and author

- Born: Derby, England
- Education: University of Oxford; University of York
- Notable work: The Tudor Sheriff: A Study in Early Modern Administration (2022)

Jonathan McGovern FRHistS is an English historian and author. He specialises in the study of Tudor England and has been a proponent of the New Administrative History.

== Education and career ==
McGovern was born in Derby and studied at Landau Forte College, then a City Technology College. He read history and English at St Peter's College, University of Oxford, where he won the Smith Prize. He holds a PhD in English from the University of York and has taught at Nanjing University, China. He is professor of English at the College of Foreign Languages and Cultures, Xiamen University.

== Academic research ==
=== Historical perspective ===
He has defended traditionalist historical methods, arguing for the importance of empiricism in history "as a practical benchmark, not a philosophical position".

=== Thomas Becket ===
In 2021, he published his discovery of the eighteenth-century origin of the phrase "Will no one rid me of this turbulent priest", which was formerly misattributed to King Henry II of England. The phrase actually originated with Robert Dodsley.

== Awards and honours ==
He was awarded the Sir John Neale Prize in 2018, the Gordon Forster Essay Prize (2018) and the Parliamentary History Essay Prize (2019). He was appointed a Fellow of the Royal Historical Society in 2022 and is a member of the Selden Society, a learned society dedicated to the study of English legal history.

== Publications ==
=== Books ===
- The Tudor Sheriff: A Study in Early Modern Administration. Oxford University Press (2022).
- The Little History of England. The History Press (2024).
- The Early Parliaments of Henry VIII, 1510–1523. Boydell Press (2025).

=== Selected articles ===
- "Was Elizabethan England Really a Monarchical Republic?", Historical Research, vol. 92, no. 257 (2019), 515–28. doi.org/10.1111/1468-2281.12275.
- "The Development of the Privy Council Oath in Tudor England", Historical Research, vol. 93, no. 260 (2020), 273–85. doi.org/10.1093/hisres/htaa003.
- "Royal Counsel in Tudor England, 1485–1603", The Historical Journal, vol. 65, no. 5 (2022), 1442–69. doi.org/10.1017/S0018246X21000820.
- "The Practical Historical Approach: A Review of the Principles and Methods of Fact-First History", World History Studies, vol. 9, no. 2 (2022), 1‒14.
