= Chicken George =

Chicken George may refer to:

- An ancestor of Alex Haley, popularized both in the book and TV miniseries Roots
- Chicken George (politics), the name for a series of costumed men who shadowed George H. W. Bush during the 1992 U.S. presidential election
- Chicken George (restaurant chain), a former fast food restaurant chain based in Baltimore, Maryland, U.S.
- Nickname of George Allen Boswell, contestant on the first and seventh seasons of Big Brother
- Nickname of George Lawrence (footballer, born 1962), who played for Southampton in the 1980s
- Nickname of George Lwandamina, Zambian national soccer team head coach
