= 1992 United States presidential election =

Election of Bill Clinton

- November 3, 1992

538 members of the Electoral College 270 electoral votes needed to win
- Turnout: 58.1% (▲5.3 pp)

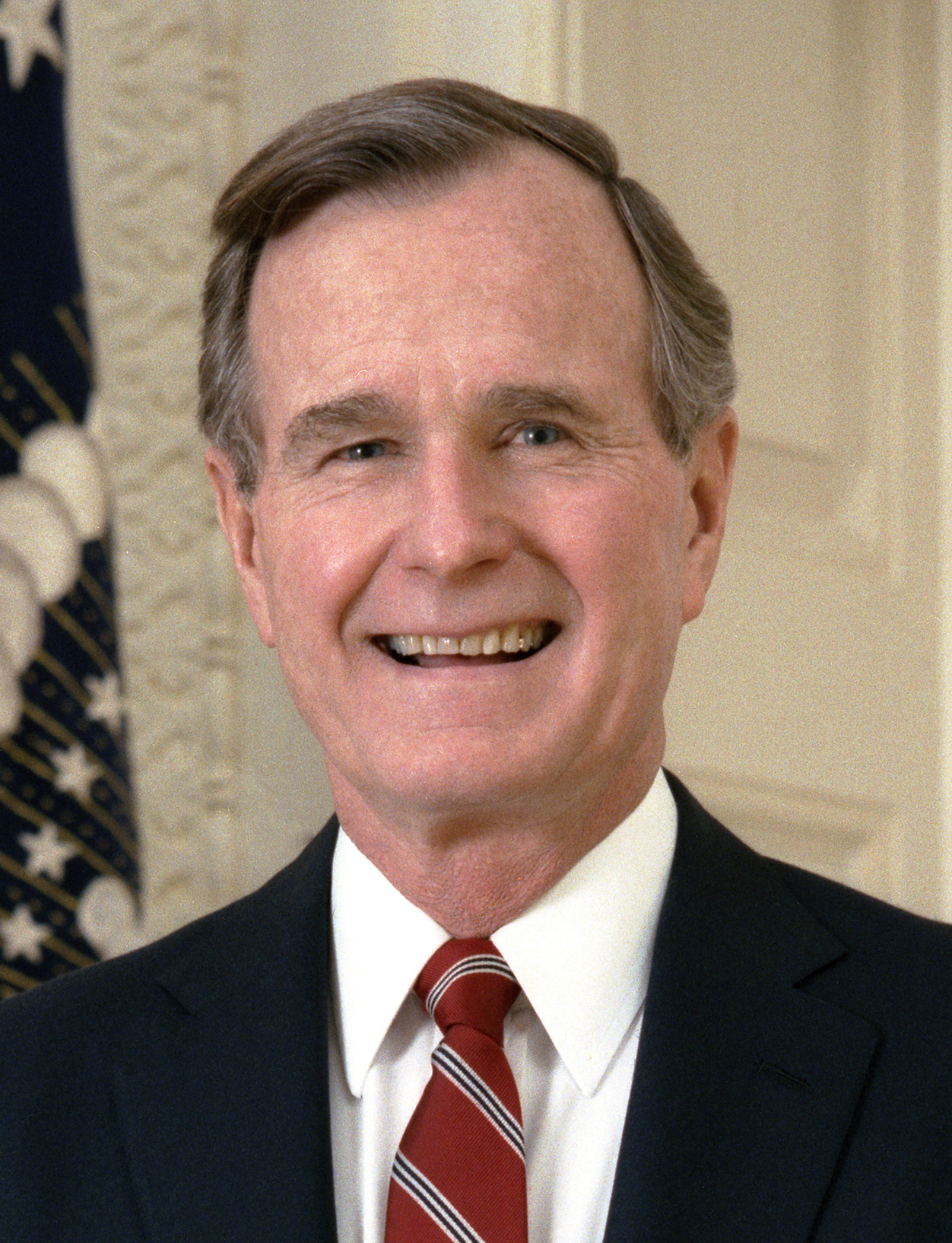

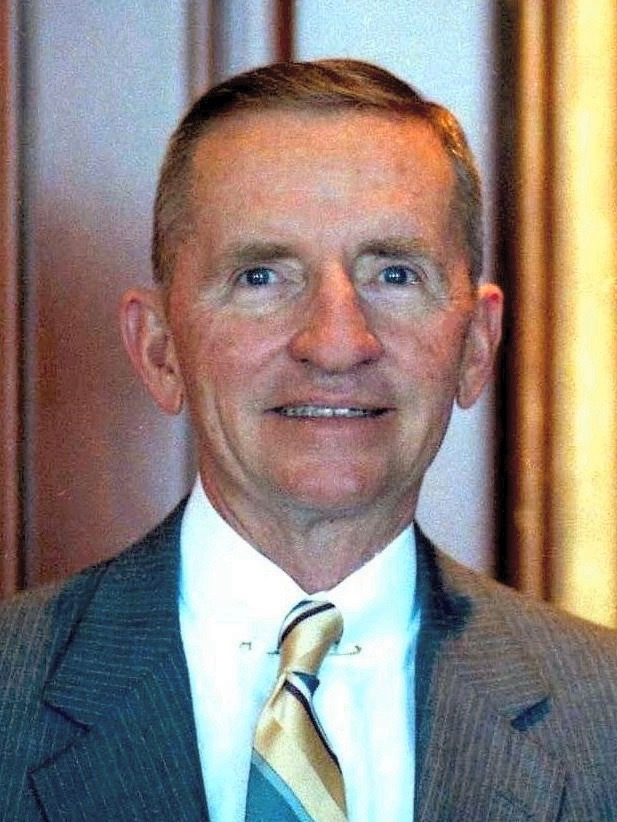
Nominee	Bill Clinton	George H. W. Bush	Ross Perot
Party	Democratic	Republican	Independent
Home state	Arkansas	Texas	Texas
Running mate	Al Gore	Dan Quayle	James Stockdale
Electoral vote	370	168	0
States carried	32 + DC	18	0
Popular vote	44,909,889	39,104,550	19,743,821
Percentage	43.0%	37.5%	18.9%
- Presidential election results map. Blue denotes states won by Clinton/Gore and red denotes those won by Bush/Quayle. Numbers indicate electoral votes cast by each state and the District of Columbia.
President before election
George H. W. Bush
Republican
Elected President
Bill Clinton
Democratic

A presidential election was held in the United States on November 3, 1992. The Democratic ticket of Arkansas governor Bill Clinton and Tennessee junior senator Al Gore defeated incumbent Republican president George H. W. Bush and vice president Dan Quayle and the independent ticket of businessman Ross Perot and vice admiral James Stockdale.

Bush had alienated many conservatives in his party by breaking his 1988 campaign pledge not to raise taxes, but he fended off a primary challenge from paleoconservative commentator Pat Buchanan without losing a single contest. Bush's popularity following his success in the Gulf War dissuaded high-profile Democratic candidates such as Mario Cuomo from entering the 1992 Democratic primaries. Clinton, a leader of the centrist Democratic Leadership Council, established himself as the front-runner for the Democratic nomination by sweeping the Super Tuesday primaries. He defeated former governor of California Jerry Brown, former Massachusetts senator Paul Tsongas, and other candidates to win the nomination, and chose Tennessee senator Al Gore as his running mate. The billionaire Perot launched an independent campaign, emphasizing his opposition to the North American Free Trade Agreement (which at the time was being actively negotiated) and his plan to reduce the national debt.

The economy had recovered from a recession in the spring of 1991, followed by 19 consecutive months of growth, but perceptions of the economy's slow growth harmed Bush, who had inherited a substantial economic boom from his predecessor Ronald Reagan. Bush's greatest strength, foreign policy, was regarded as much less important following the dissolution of the Soviet Union and the end of the Cold War, as well as the relatively peaceful climate in the Middle East after the Gulf War. Perot led in several polls taken in June 1992, but severely damaged his candidacy by temporarily dropping out of the race in July. The Bush campaign criticized Clinton's character and emphasized Bush's foreign policy successes, while Clinton focused on the economy.

Clinton won a plurality in the popular vote and a majority of the electoral vote, breaking a streak of three consecutive Republican victories and 12 consecutive years of Republican rule of the White House, as well ending a longer period of Republican dominance in American presidential politics that began in 1968, with the exception of Jimmy Carter's narrow victory in 1976. Clinton flipped a total of 22 states that had voted Republican in the election of 1988. Perot won 18.9% of the popular vote, the highest share of the vote won by a candidate outside of the two major parties since 1912. This is the most recent presidential election in which an independent or third-party candidate placed second in any state (Maine and Utah). As of 2024, this marked the last election in which the Democratic nominee won Montana. It was also the last election in which the Democratic nominee won Georgia until 2020. Due to the three-way split, only two contests were won by an absolute majority (Arkansas and Washington D.C.), the fewest in American history.

== Democratic Party nomination ==
Democratic Party (United States) 1992 Democratic Party ticket
Bill Clinton	Al Gore
for President	for Vice President
40th and 42nd Governor of Arkansas (1979–1981, 1983–1992)	U.S. Senator from Tennessee (1985–1993)
Campaign

Candidates in this section are sorted by date of withdrawal from the primaries
Jerry Brown	Paul Tsongas	Tom Harkin	Bob Kerrey	Douglas Wilder
Governor of California (1975–1983)	U.S. Senator from Massachusetts (1979–1985)	U.S. Senator from Iowa (1985–2015)	U.S. Senator from Nebraska (1989–2001)	Governor of Virginia (1990–1994)
Campaign	Campaign	Campaign	Campaign	Campaign
Eliminated at Convention: July 15, 1992; 4,071,232 votes	Suspended Campaign: March 19, 1992; Endorsed Bill Clinton: June 3, 1992; 3,656,010 votes	Withdrew: March 9, 1992; Endorsed Bill Clinton: March 26, 1992; 318,457 votes	Withdrew: March 5, 1992; Endorsed Bill Clinton: May 14, 1992 (Note: There hasn't been a definitive point found where Kerrey endorsed Clinton, but he had a speaking slot at the Democratic Convention which required one to have endorsed him; this is the closest determined instance); 280,304 votes	Withdrew: January 8, 1992; Endorsed Bill Clinton: July 14, 1992; 240 votes

=== Overview ===
Following the successful performance by U.S. and coalition forces in the Persian Gulf War, President George H. W. Bush's approval ratings were 89%. His re-election was considered very likely; several high-profile candidates, such as Mario Cuomo and Jesse Jackson, refused to seek the Democratic nomination. U.S. Senator Al Gore from Tennessee refused to seek the nomination due to the fact his son had been struck by a car and was undergoing surgery and physical therapy; however, Tom Harkin, Paul Tsongas, Jerry Brown, Larry Agran, Bob Kerrey, Douglas Wilder, and Bill Clinton chose to run as candidates.

Harkin, a U.S. Senator from Iowa, ran as a populist liberal with labor union support. Tsongas, a former U.S. Senator from Massachusetts, highlighted his political independence and fiscal conservatism. Jerry Brown, the former California governor who had run for the Democratic nomination in 1976 and 1980, declared a significant reform agenda, including Congressional term limits, campaign finance reform, and the adoption of a flat income tax. Nebraska senator Bob Kerrey was an attractive candidate based on his business and military background, but made several gaffes on the campaign trail. Arkansas governor Bill Clinton positioned himself as a centrist, or New Democrat. He was relatively unknown nationally before the primary season. That quickly changed when Gennifer Flowers alleged an extramarital affair. Clinton denied the story, appearing on 60 Minutes with his wife, Hillary Clinton; later in 1998, he admitted the affair.

The primary began with Harkin winning his native Iowa as expected. Tsongas won the New Hampshire primary on February 18, but Clinton's second-place finish, helped by his speech labeling himself "The Comeback Kid", energized his campaign. Brown won the Maine caucus and Kerrey won South Dakota. Clinton won his first primary in Georgia. Tsongas won the Utah and Maryland primaries and a caucus in Washington. Harkin won caucuses in Idaho and Minnesota while Brown won Colorado. Kerrey dropped out two days later. Clinton won the South Carolina and Wyoming primaries and Tsongas won Arizona. Harkin dropped out. Brown won the Nevada caucus. Clinton swept nearly all of the Super Tuesday primaries on March 10 making him the solid front runner. Clinton won the Michigan and Illinois primaries. Tsongas dropped out after finishing third in Michigan; however, Brown began to pick up steam, aided by using a phone number to receive funding from small donors. Brown scored surprising wins in Connecticut, Vermont and Alaska. As the race moved to the primaries in New York and Wisconsin, Brown had taken the lead in polls in both states. Then he made a serious gaffe by announcing to an audience of New York City's Jewish community that he would consider Jesse Jackson as a vice presidential candidate; Jackson had offended many Jewish people with remarks he had made during his own presidential campaigns. Clinton won dramatically in New York (41%–26%) and closely in Wisconsin (37%–34%). Clinton then proceeded to win a long streak of primaries leading up to Brown's home state of California. Clinton won this state 48% to 41% and secured the delegates needed to lock the nomination.

The convention met in New York City, and the official tally was:

- Bill Clinton 3,372
- Jerry Brown 596
- Paul Tsongas 289
- Robert P. Casey 10
- Pat Schroeder 5
- Larry Agran 3
- Al Gore 1

Clinton chose Gore to be his running mate on July 9, 1992. Choosing fellow Southerner Gore went against the popular strategy of balancing a Southern candidate with a Northern partner. Gore served to balance the ticket in other ways, as he was perceived as strong on family values and environmental issues, while Clinton was not. Gore's similarities to Clinton also allowed him to push some of his key campaign themes, such as centrism and generational change.

== Republican Party nomination ==
Republican Party (United States) 1992 Republican Party ticket
George H. W. Bush	Dan Quayle
for President	for Vice President
41st President of the United States (1989–1993)	44th Vice President of the United States (1989–1993)
Campaign

Candidates in this section are sorted by date of withdrawal from the primaries
Pat Buchanan	David Duke
White House Communications Director from Virginia (1985–1987)	State Representative from Louisiana (1989–1992)
Campaign	Campaign
Withdrew: August 17, 1992; Endorsed George Bush: August 17, 1992; 2,899,488 votes	Withdrew: April 22, 1992; 119,115 votes

President Bush had the public support and endorsement of former President Ronald Reagan and the Republican Party establishment. However, he faced a primary challenge from paleoconservative journalist Pat Buchanan, who became the primary opponent of President Bush; Ron Paul, the Libertarian Party's presidential nominee in 1988, had planned to run against the President, but dropped out shortly after Buchanan's entry in December. Buchanan's best showing was in the New Hampshire primary on February 18, 1992—where Bush won by a 53–38% margin. President Bush won 73% of all primary votes, with 9,199,463 votes. Buchanan won 2,899,488 votes; unpledged delegates won 287,383 votes, and David Duke, Grand Wizard of the Ku Klux Klan, won 119,115 votes. Just over 100,000 votes were cast for all other candidates, half of which were write-in votes for H. Ross Perot. Former Minnesota governor Harold Stassen, who had run for president nine times since 1944, also mounted his final campaign.

President George H. W. Bush and Vice President Dan Quayle easily won renomination by the Republican Party. However, the success of the opposition forced the moderate Bush to move further to the right than in the previous election, and to incorporate many socially conservative planks in the party platform. Bush allowed Buchanan to give a prime time address at the Republican National Convention in Houston, Texas, and his "Culture War" speech alienated liberal Republicans.

With intense pressure on the Buchanan delegates to relent, the tally for president went as follows:

- George H. W. Bush 2166
- Pat Buchanan 18
- former ambassador Alan Keyes 1

Vice President Dan Quayle was renominated by voice vote.

== Ross Perot candidacy ==
1992 Independent ticket
Ross Perot	James Stockdale
for President	for Vice President
President and CEO of Perot Systems (1988–2009)	President of the Naval War College (1977–1979)
Campaign

Ross Perot was on the ballot in every state; in six states (Alaska, Arkansas, Connecticut, Louisiana, Oregon, Pennsylvania) Perot was placed on the ballot through the formation of a political party supporting his candidacy. His electoral performance in each of those states led to those parties being given ballot-qualified status.

The public's concern about the federal budget deficit and fears of professional politicians led to the independent candidacy of billionaire Texan Ross Perot increasing in popularity in the polls—at one point Perot was leading the major party candidates. Perot crusaded against the North American Free Trade Agreement (NAFTA), and internal and external national debt, tapping into voters' potential fear of the deficit. His volunteers succeeded in collecting enough signatures to get his name on the ballot in all 50 states. In June, Perot led the national public opinion polls with support from 39% of the voters (versus 31% for Bush and 25% for Clinton). Perot severely damaged his credibility by dropping out of the presidential contest in July and remaining out of the race for several weeks before re-entering. He compounded this damage by eventually claiming, without evidence, that his withdrawal was due to Republican operatives attempting to disrupt his daughter's wedding.

Perot and retired Vice Admiral James Stockdale drew 19,743,821 votes (19% of the popular vote).

== Minor parties and independents ==
Minor party candidates, 1992
Libertarian	New Alliance	Natural Law	Populist	U.S. Taxpayers'	Democrats for Economic Recovery
Andre Marrou	Lenora Fulani	John Hagelin	Bo Gritz	Howard Phillips	Lyndon LaRouche
Alaska State; Representative (1985–1987)	Psychologist and political activist	Scientist and researcher	Conservative political activist	Conservative political activist	Political activist

=== Libertarian Party nomination ===
Andre Marrou was on the ballot in every state.

Libertarian candidates:

- Andre Marrou, former Alaska State Representative and 1988 vice presidential nominee
- Richard B. Boddie, political science professor from California

The 6th Libertarian Party National Convention was held in Chicago, Illinois. There, the Libertarian Party nominated Andre Marrou, former Alaska State Representative and the Party's 1988 vice presidential candidate, for president. Nancy Lord was his running mate.

Marrou and Lord drew 291,627 votes (0.28% of the popular vote).

=== New Alliance Party nomination ===
Lenora Fulani was on the ballot in thirty-nine states (352 Electoral Votes). Those states with a lighter shade are states in which she was an official write-in candidate.

New Alliance candidate:

- Lenora Fulani, Psychotherapist and political activist from New Jersey, and the 1988 Presidential nominee

Lenora Fulani, who was the 1988 presidential nominee of the New Alliance Party, received a second consecutive nomination from the Party in 1992. Unlike in 1988, Fulani failed to gain ballot access in every state, deciding to concentrate some of that campaign funding towards exposure of her candidacy and the Party to the national public.

Fulani also sought the endorsement of the Peace and Freedom Party of California, but despite winning a majority in that party's primary, she would lose the nomination to Ronald Daniels, the former Director the National Rainbow Coalition. Rather than pursuing a ballot space of her own, Fulani would endorse Daniels's candidacy in California.

Fulani and her running mate Maria Elizabeth Muñoz received 73,622 votes (0.1% of the popular vote).

=== Natural Law Party nomination ===
John Hagelin was on the ballot in twenty-eight states (264 Electoral Votes). Those states with a lighter shade are states in which he was an official write-in candidate.

The newly formed Natural Law Party nominated scientist and researcher John Hagelin for president and Mike Tompkins for vice president. The Natural Law Party had been founded in 1992 by Hagelin and 12 others who felt that governmental problems could be solved more effectively by following "Natural Laws". The party platform included preventive health care, sustainable agriculture and renewable energy technologies. During this and future campaigns, Hagelin favored abortion rights without public financing, campaign finance law reform, improved gun control, a flat tax, the eradication of PACs, a ban on soft money contributions, and school vouchers.

The party's first presidential ticket appeared on the ballot in 28 states and drew 37,137 votes (<0.1% of the popular vote).

=== U.S. Taxpayers' Party nomination ===
Howard Phillips was on the ballot in twenty-one states (215 Electoral Votes). Those states with a lighter shade are states in which he was an official write-in candidate.

U.S. Taxpayers' candidates:

- Howard Phillips, conservative political activist from Virginia
- Pat Buchanan, conservative columnist from Virginia (declined interest)
- Gordon J. Humphrey, former senator from New Hampshire (declined interest)

The U.S. Taxpayers Party ran its first presidential ticket in 1992, having only been formed the prior year. Initially Howard Phillips had hoped to successfully entice a prominent conservative politician, such as the former senator Gordon J. Humphrey from New Hampshire, or even Patrick Buchanan who at the time had only been mulling over running against President Bush (he would officially declare in December 1991).

No one, however, announced any intention to seek the Taxpayers Party nomination; Buchanan himself in the end endorsed President Bush at the Republican National Convention in Houston. Phillips had been unofficially nominated earlier in the year so as to allow the Party to be able to seek ballot access properly. While initially a temporary post, it was made permanent at the party's national convention, which was held in New Orleans on September 4 and 5. At the convention, which was attended by delegates from thirty-two states and Washington, D.C., Phillips received 264 votes on the first ballot, while Albion Knight was approved as his running mate by acclamation.

Earlier that year, in the June 2 California primary, Phillips had received 15,456 votes in the American Independent Party primary. On August 30, the American Independent Party voted to affiliate with the U.S. Taxpayers Party, an affiliation which continued until 2008.

Phillips and Knight drew 43,369 votes (<0.1% of the popular vote).

=== Populist Party nomination ===
Bo Gritz was on the ballot in eighteen states (161 Electoral Votes). Those states with a lighter shade are states in which he was an official write-in candidate.

Populist candidate:

- Bo Gritz, former United States Army Special Forces officer and Vietnam veteran

Former United States Army Special Forces officer and Vietnam veteran Bo Gritz was the nominee of the Populist Party, facing virtually no opposition. Under the campaign slogan "God, Guns and Gritz" and publishing his political manifesto "The Bill of Gritz" (playing on his last name rhyming with "rights"), he called for staunch opposition to what he called "global government" and "The New World Order", ending all foreign aid, abolishing federal income tax, and abolishing the Federal Reserve System. During the campaign, Gritz openly proclaimed the United States to be a "Christian Nation", stating that the country's legal statutes "should reflect unashamed acceptance of Almighty God and His Laws". His run on the America First/Populist Party ticket was prompted by his association with another far-right political Christian talk radio host, Tom Valentine. During his campaign, part of Gritz's standard stump speech was an idea to pay off the national debt by minting a coin at the Treasury and sending it to the Federal Reserve. This predates the 2012 trillion-dollar coin concept.

During August 1992, Gritz attracted national attention as mediator during the government standoff with Randy Weaver at Ruby Ridge, Idaho.

He received 106,152 votes nationwide (0.1% of the popular vote). In two states he had a respectable showing for a minor third-party candidate: Utah, where he received 3.8% of the vote and Idaho, where he received 2.1% of the vote. In some counties, his support topped 10%, and in Franklin County, Idaho, was only a few votes away from pushing Bill Clinton into fourth place in the county.

=== Lyndon LaRouche's candidacy ===
Lyndon LaRouche was on the ballot in seventeen states (156 Electoral Votes). Those states with a lighter shade are states in which he was an official write-in candidate.

While officially running for the Democratic presidential nomination, Lyndon LaRouche also decided to run as an independent in the general election, standing as the National Economic Recovery candidate. LaRouche was in jail at the time, having been convicted of conspiracy to commit mail fraud in December 1988; it was only the second time in history that the presidency was sought from a prison cell (after Socialist Party candidate Eugene V. Debs, while imprisoned for his opposition to U.S. involvement in World War I, ran in 1920). His running-mate was James Bevel, a civil rights activist who had represented the LaRouche movement in its pursuit of the Franklin child prostitution ring allegations.

In addition to the displayed states, LaRouche had nearly made the ballot in the states of New York and Mississippi. In the case of New York, while his petition was valid and had enough signatures, none of his electors filed declarations of candidacy; in the cases of Mississippi a sore-loser law was in place, and because he ran in that state's Democratic presidential primary he was ineligible to run as an independent in the general. Ohio also had a sore-loser law, but it was ruled in Brown vs. Taft that it did not apply to presidential candidates. LaRouche and Beval drew 22,863 votes. (<0.1% of the popular vote).

=== Socialist Workers' Party nomination ===
James Warren was on the ballot in thirteen states (148 Electoral Votes). Those states with a lighter shade are states in which he was an official write-in candidate.

Socialist Workers candidate:

- James Warren, journalist and steel worker from Illinois, and the 1988 Presidential nominee

James Warren, who was the 1988 presidential nominee of the Socialist Workers Party, received a second consecutive nomination from the Party on the first of November 1991. Warren had two running mates that varied from state to state; Estelle DeBates and Willie Mae Reid, the latter also a resident of Illinois.

Warren received 22,882 votes (<0.1% of the popular vote).

=== Ron Daniels candidacy ===
Ron Daniels was on the ballot in eight states (126 Electoral Votes). Those states with a lighter shade are states in which he was an official write-in candidate.

- Ronald Daniels, former director of the National Rainbow Coalition

Ronald Daniels was the former executive director for the Center for Constitutional Rights, the former director of the National Rainbow Coalition, and the worked on both of Jesse Jackson's campaigns for the Democratic presidential nomination. Asiba Tupahache, a Native American activist from New York was his running-mate.

Though running an independent campaign under the label "Campaign for a Better Tomorrow", Daniels was endorsed by a number of third parties across the states, most notably the Peace and Freedom Party of California; though he had lost that party's presidential primary to Lenora Fulani, the nominee of the New Alliance Party, the delegates at its convention voted in favor of his candidacy 110–91, the only time it has ever nominated someone other than the winner of the primary.

Daniels and Tupachache drew 27,396 votes (<0.1% of the popular vote).

=== Other nominations ===
The 1992 campaign also marked the entry of Ralph Nader into presidential politics as a candidate. Despite the advice of several liberal and environmental groups, Nader did not formally run. Rather, he tried to make an impact in the New Hampshire primaries, urging members of both parties to write-in his name. As a result, several thousand Democrats and Republicans wrote-in Nader's name. Despite supporting mostly liberal legislation during his career as a consumer advocate, Nader received more votes from Republicans than Democrats.

The Worker's League nominated Helen Halyard for president; she was the party's nominee for vice president in 1984 and 1988. Fred Mazelis was nominated for vice president. Halyard and Mazelis drew 3,050 votes.

==== John Viamouyiannis candidacy ====
Ballot access: Michigan, New Jersey (33 Electoral)

John Yiamouyiannis, a major opponent of water fluoridation, ran as an independent under the label "Take Back America". Allen C. McCone was his running-mate. Yiamouyiannis and McCone drew 2,199 votes.

==== Socialist Party nomination ====
Ballot access: Arkansas, Iowa, Louisiana, Tennessee (33 Electoral)

The Socialist Party nominated J. Quinn Brisben for president and Barbara Garson for vice president. Brisben and Garson drew 2,909 votes.

==== Grassroots Party nomination ====
Ballot access: DC, Tennessee, Utah, Wisconsin (30 Electoral)

The Grassroots Party nominated Jack Herer, a noted cannabis activist for president and Derrick Grimmer for vice president. Herer and Grimmer drew 3,875 votes.

==== Prohibition Party nomination ====
Ballot access: Iowa, Minnesota, Wisconsin (28 Electoral)

The Prohibition Party nominated Earl Dodge, the party's chairman for president and George Ormsby for vice president. Dodge and Ormsby drew 935 votes.

==== Drew Bradford candidacy ====
Ballot access: Arkansas, New Mexico, Tennessee (22 Electoral)

Drew Bradford was an independent candidate for the Presidency; he did not have a running-mate. Bradford drew 4,749 votes.

==== Delbert Ehlers candidacy ====
Ballot access: Wisconsin (11 Electoral)

Delbert Ehlers was an independent candidate for the Presidency. His running-mate was Rick Wendt. Ehlers and Wendt drew 1,149 votes.

== General election ==
=== Polling ===
Poll source	Date	Bill Clinton Democratic	George Bush Republican	Ross Perot Independent	Other	Undecided	Lead
Election Results	Nov. 3, 1992	43.01%	37.45%	18.91%	0.63%	0%	5.56
Gallup/CNN/USA Today	Oct. 31 – Nov. 1	44%	36%	14%	–	6%	8
Harris	Oct. 30 – Nov. 1	42%	38%	16%	–	4%	4
Gallup/CNN/USA Today	Oct. 30 – Oct. 31	43%	36%	15%	–	6%	7
Newsweek	Oct. 20 – Oct. 23	42%	30%	22%	–	6%	12
New York Times/CBS News	Oct. 20 – Oct. 23	42%	37%	17%	–	4%	5
Gallup/CNN/USA Today	Oct. 21 – Oct. 22	43%	31%	18%	–	8%	12
Time/CNN	Oct. 20 – Oct. 22	38%	31%	17%	–	14%	7
Harris	Oct. 20 – Oct. 22	46%	32%	18%	–	4%	12
Washington Post	Oct. 19 – Oct. 22	42%	34%	20%	–	4%	8
US News	Oct. 20 – Oct. 21	45%	31%	20%	–	4%	14
NBC News/Wall Street Journal	Oct. 20 – Oct. 21	47%	28%	19%	–	6%	19
Gallup/CNN/USA Today	Oct. 13 – Oct. 15	47%	34%	13%	–	6%	13
Gallup/CNN/USA Today	Oct. 6 – Oct. 8	49%	34%	10%	–	7%	15
NBC News/Washington Post	Oct. 4 – Oct. 5	46%	32%	10%	–	12%	14
Los Angeles Times	Oct. 2 – Oct. 5	48%	34%	9%	–	9%	14
Harris	Oct. 1 – Oct. 4	53%	36%	9%	–	2%	17
ABC News/Washington Post	Oct. 1 – Oct. 4	48%	35%	9%	–	8%	13
October 1: Perot Reenters Race
Gallup/CNN/USA Today	Sep. 28 – Sep. 30	52%	35%	7%	–	6%	17
Gallup	Sep. 17 – Sep. 20	50%	40%	—	–	10%	10
Gallup/CNN/USA Today	Sep. 11 – Sep. 15	51%	42%	—	–	7%	9
Tarrance Group	Sep. 1 - Sep. 6	48%	43%	-	–	9%	5
Gallup/CNN/USA Today	Aug. 31 – Sep. 2	54%	39%	—	–	7%	15
Harris	Aug. 26 – Sep. 1	50%	45%	-	–	5%	5
ABC News/Washington Post	Aug. 26 – Aug. 30	56%	36%	-	–	8%	20
Gallup/CNN/USA Today	Aug. 21 – Aug. 22	52%	42%	—	–	6%	10
August 20: Republican National Convention Ends
Tarrance Group	Aug. 15 - Aug. 19	48%	43%	-	–	9%	5
Tarrance Group	Aug. 15 - Aug. 18	51%	40%	-	–	9%	11
Tarrance Group	Aug. 15 - Aug. 17	51%	35%	-	–	14%	16
Gallup/CNN/USA Today	Aug. 17	58%	35%	—	–	7%	23
August 17: Republican National Convention Starts
Gallup/CNN/USA Today	Aug. 10 – Aug. 12	58%	35%	—	–	7%	23
Gallup	Jul. 31 – Aug. 2	57%	32%	—	–	11%	25
Gallup	Jul. 24 – Jul. 16	56%	36%	—	–	8%	20
Harris	Jul. 17 – Jul. 19	63%	33%	-	–	4%	30
NBC News/Washington Post	Jul. 17 – Jul. 19	58%	29%	-	–	13%	29
Gallup/CNN/USA Today	Jul. 17 – Jul. 18	56%	34%	—	–	10%	22
July 16: Perot Withdraws; Democratic National Convention Ends
Tarrance Group	Jul. 13 - Jul. 14	40%	31%	20%	–	9%	9
Tarrance Group	Jul. 13	35%	31%	24%	–	10%	4
July 13: Democratic National Convention Starts
New York Times/CBS News	Jul. 8 – Jul. 11	30%	33%	25%	–	12%	3
Gallup/CNN/USA Today	Jul. 6 – Jul. 8	28%	35%	30%	–	7%	5
NBC News/Washington Post	Jul. 5 – Jul. 7	28%	31%	33%	–	8%	2
Gallup	Jun. 26 – Jun. 30	27%	33%	32%	–	8%	1
New York Times/CBS News	Jun. 17 – Jun. 20	24%	32%	30%	–	14%	2
Gallup	Jun. 12 – Jun. 14	24%	32%	34%	–	10%	2
Harris	Jun. 5 – Jun. 10	25%	33%	37%	–	6%	4
Gallup	Jun. 4 – Jun. 8	25%	31%	39%	–	5%	8
Gallup	May 18 – May 20	25%	35%	35%	–	5%	Tied
NBC News/Wall Street Journal	May 15 – May 19	27%	35%	30%	–	8%	5
Gallup	May 7 – May 10	29%	35%	30%	–	6%	5
Gallup/CNN/USA Today	Apr. 20 – Apr. 22	26%	41%	25%	–	8%	15
New York Times/CBS News	Apr. 20 – Apr. 23	28%	38%	23%	–	11%	10
Gallup/CNN/USA Today	Mar. 31 – Apr. 1	25%	44%	24%	–	7%	19
New York Times/CBS News	Mar. 26 – Mar. 29	31%	44%	16%	–	9%	13
Gallup/CNN/USA Today	Mar. 20 – Mar. 22	43%	52%	—	–	5%	9
Gallup/CNN/USA Today	Mar. 11 – Mar. 12	44%	50%	—	–	6%	6
Gallup	Feb. 19 – Feb. 20	43%	53%	—	–	4%	10
Gallup	Feb. 6 – Feb. 9	38%	53%	—	–	9%	15
Harris	Dec. 26 – Dec. 30	47%	48%	—	–	5%	1

=== Campaign ===
After Bill Clinton secured the Democratic Party's nomination in the spring of 1992, polls showed Ross Perot leading the race, followed by President Bush and Clinton in third place after a grueling nomination process. Two-way trial heats between Bush and Clinton in early 1992 showed Bush in the lead. As the economy continued to sour and the President's approval rating continued to slide, the Democrats began to rally around their nominee. On July 9, 1992, Clinton chose Tennessee senator and former 1988 presidential candidate Al Gore to be his running mate. As Governor Clinton's nomination acceptance speech approached, Ross Perot dropped out of the race, convinced that staying in the race with a "revitalized Democratic Party" would cause the race to be decided by the United States House of Representatives. Clinton gave his acceptance speech on July 16, 1992, promising to bring a "new covenant" to America, and to work to heal the gap that had developed between the rich and the poor during the Reagan/Bush years. The Clinton campaign received the biggest convention "bounce" in history which brought him from 25% in the spring, behind Bush and Perot, to 55% versus Bush's 31%.

After the convention, Clinton and Gore began a bus tour around the United States, while the Bush/Quayle campaign began to criticize Clinton's character, highlighting accusations of infidelity and draft dodging. The Bush campaign emphasized its foreign policy successes such as Desert Storm, and the end of the Cold War. Bush also contrasted his military service to Clinton's lack thereof, and criticized Clinton's lack of foreign policy expertise. However, as the economy was the main issue, Bush's campaign floundered across the nation, even in strongly Republican areas, and Clinton maintained leads with over 50% of the vote nationwide consistently, while Bush typically saw numbers in the upper 30s. As Bush's economic edge had evaporated, his campaign looked to energize its socially conservative base at the 1992 Republican National Convention in Houston, Texas. At the convention, Bush's primary campaign opponent Pat Buchanan gave his famous "culture war" speech, criticizing Clinton's and Gore's social progressiveness, and voicing skepticism on his "New Democrat" brand. After President Bush accepted his renomination, his campaign saw a small bounce in the polls, but this was short-lived, as Clinton maintained his lead. The campaign continued with a lopsided lead for Clinton through September, until Ross Perot decided to re-enter the race. Ross Perot's re-entry in the race was welcomed by the Bush campaign, as Fred Steeper, a poll taker for Bush, said, "He'll be important if we accomplish our goal, which is to draw even with Clinton." Initially, Perot's return saw the Texas billionaire's numbers stay low, until he was given the opportunity to participate in a trio of unprecedented three-man debates. The race narrowed, as Perot's numbers significantly improved as Clinton's numbers declined, while Bush's numbers remained more or less the same from earlier in the race as Perot and Bush began to hammer at Clinton on character issues once again.

=== Presidential debates ===
The Commission on Presidential Debates organised four presidential debates

Debates among candidates for the 1992 U.S. presidential election
No.	Date	Host	Location	Panelists	Moderator	Participants	Viewership (Millions)
P1	Sunday, October 11, 1992	Washington University in St. Louis	St. Louis, Missouri	Sander Vanocur; Ann Compton; John Mashek	Jim Lehrer	President George H. W. Bush; Governor Bill Clinton; Mr. Ross Perot	62.4
VP	Tuesday, October 13, 1992	Georgia Institute of Technology	Atlanta, Georgia	n/a	Hal Bruno	Vice President Dan Quayle; Senator Al Gore; Admiral James Stockdale	51.2
P2	Thursday, October 15, 1992	University of Richmond	Richmond, Virginia	n/a	Carole Simpson	President George H. W. Bush; Governor Bill Clinton; Mr. Ross Perot	69.9
P3	Monday, October 19, 1992	Michigan State University	East Lansing, Michigan	Gene Gibbons; Helen Thomas; Susan Rook	Jim Lehrer	President George H. W. Bush; Governor Bill Clinton; Mr. Ross Perot	66.9

=== Character issues ===
Many character issues were raised during the campaign, including allegations that Clinton had dodged the draft during the Vietnam War, and had used marijuana, which Clinton claimed he had ‘tried’ to smoke, but "didn't inhale." Bush also accused Clinton of meeting with communists on a trip to Russia he took as a student. Clinton was often accused of being a philanderer by political opponents.

Allegations were also made that Bill Clinton had engaged in a long-term extramarital affair with Gennifer Flowers. Clinton denied ever having an affair with Flowers, but later admitted, under threat of perjury, that he had a brief sexual encounter with her in 1977.

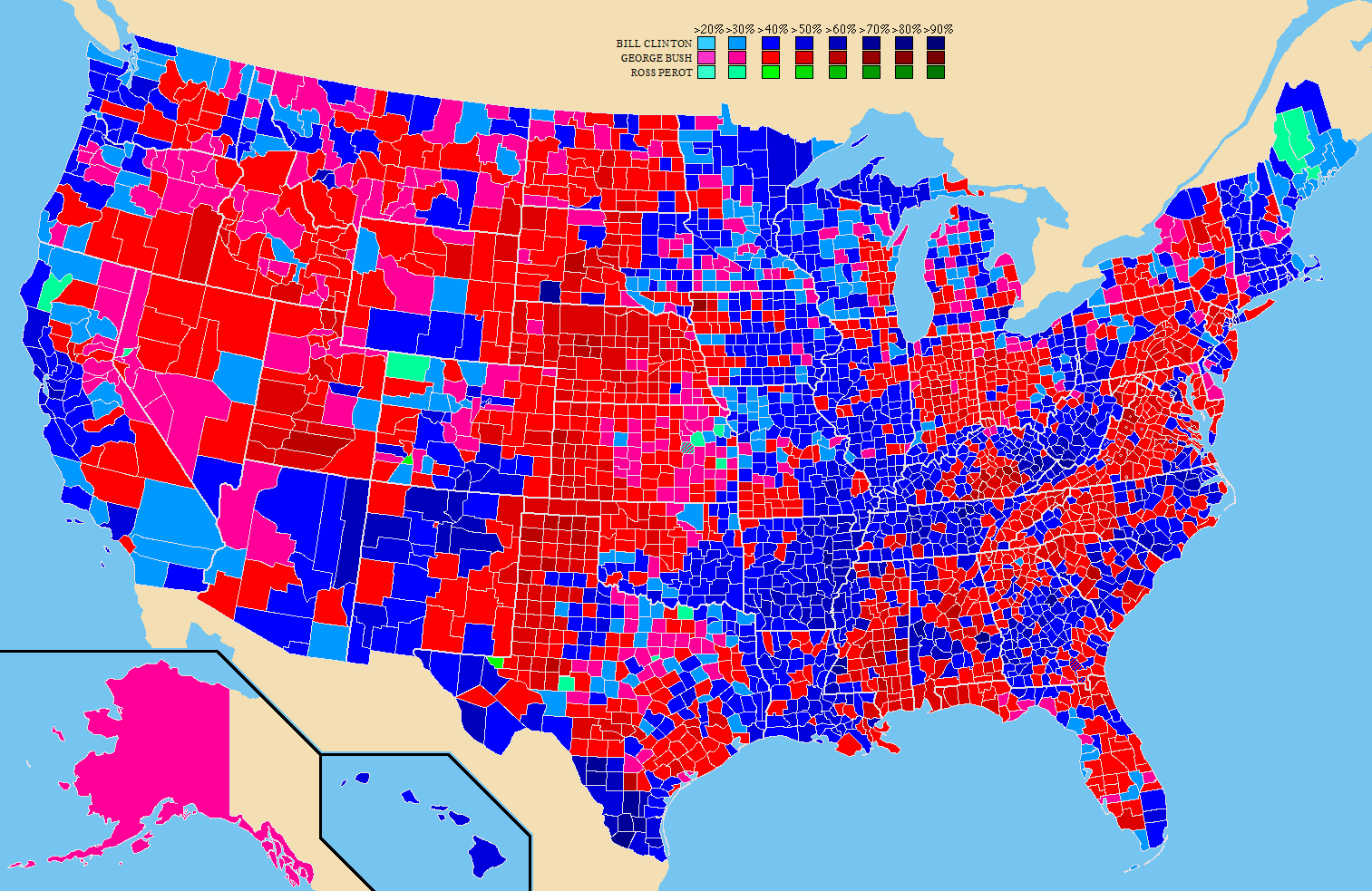
Election results by county Bill Clinton George H. W. Bush Ross Perot

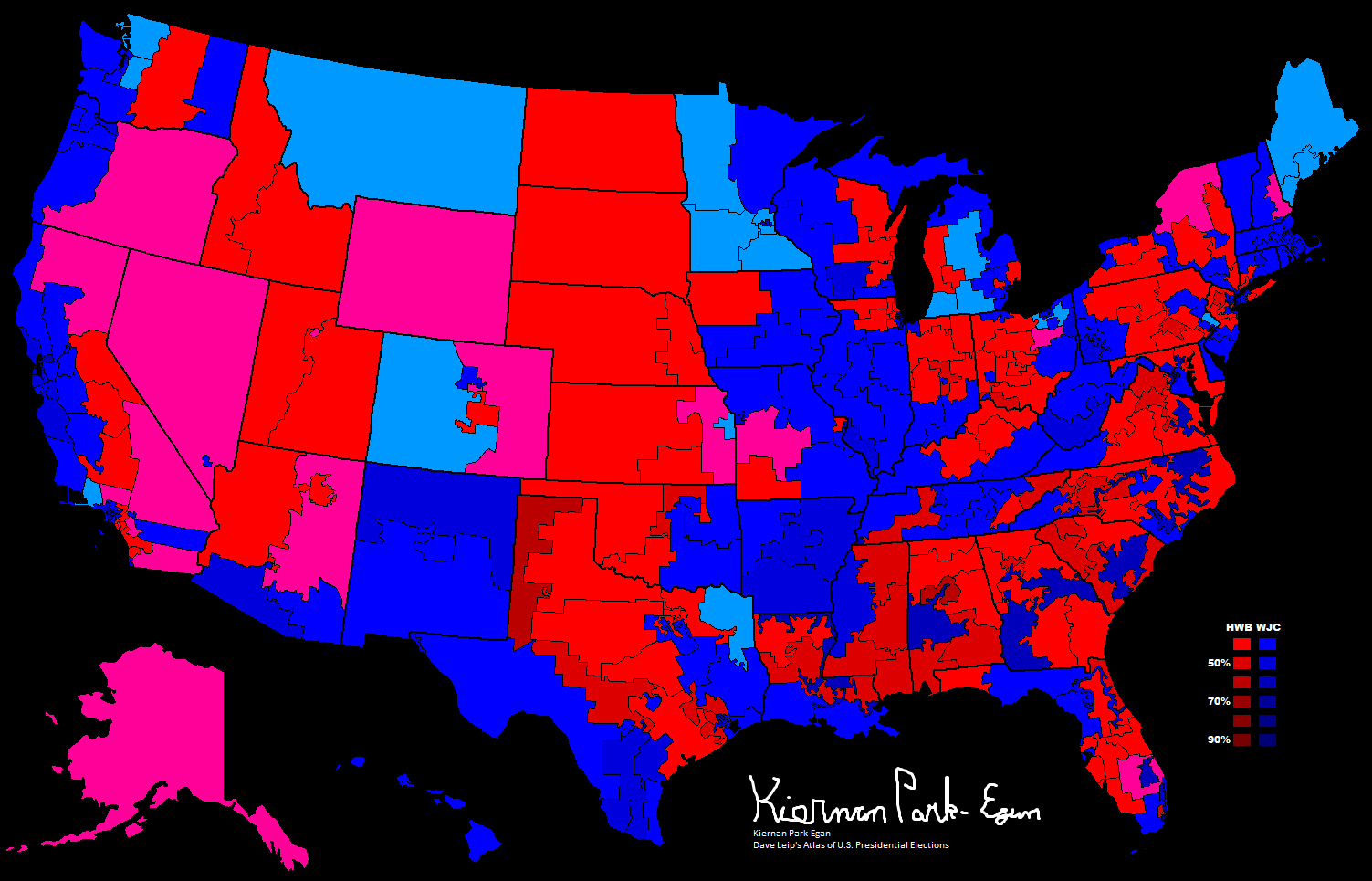
Results by congressional district.

== Results ==
Clinton was declared the winner by CBS, NBC, and CNN at 10:48 P.M. EST and by ABC at 10:50 P.M. EST. He received 370 electoral votes from 32 states and D.C. and 43% of the popular vote while Bush received 168 electoral votes from 18 states and 37.4% of the popular vote and Perot received 18.9% of the popular vote and no electoral votes. The remaining candidates took 0.6% of the popular vote. While winning the popular vote, Clinton did not win a majority of the popular vote; he was the first presidential candidate since Richard Nixon in 1968 to win the popular vote with a plurality, and the first Democrat since John F. Kennedy in 1960 to do so. Only Washington, D.C., and Clinton's home state of Arkansas gave the majority of their votes to a single candidate in the entire country; the rest were won by pluralities of the vote. Clinton was the first Democrat since 1964 to win a majority of states.

Even though Clinton received roughly 3,100,815 more votes than Democratic nominee Michael Dukakis had four years earlier, the Democrats recorded a 2.7 percentage point decrease in their share of the popular vote compared to 1988 due to the higher turnout. His 43% share of the popular vote was the second-lowest for any winning candidate in the 20th century after Woodrow Wilson in 1912 (41.8%). President Bush's 37.4% was the lowest percentage total for a sitting president seeking re-election since William Howard Taft, also in 1912 (23.2%). 1992 was, as the 1912 election was, a three-way race (that time between Taft, Wilson, and Theodore Roosevelt). It was also the lowest percentage for a major-party candidate since Alf Landon received 36.5% of the vote in 1936. Bush had a lower percentage of the popular vote than even Herbert Hoover, who was defeated in 1932 (39.7%). However, none of these races included a major third-party candidate.

Independent candidate Ross Perot received 19,743,821 with 18.9% of the popular vote. The billionaire used his own money to advertise extensively, and is the only non-major party candidate and the only non-party affiliated candidate ever allowed into the nationally televised presidential debates with both major party candidates (independent John Anderson debated Republican Ronald Reagan in 1980, but without Democrat Jimmy Carter, who had refused to appear in a three-man debate). Speaking about the North American Free Trade Agreement, Perot described its effect on American jobs as causing a "giant sucking sound". For a period of time, Perot was leading in the polls, but he lost much of his support when he temporarily withdrew from the election, only to declare himself a candidate again soon after. This was also the most recent time that a non-major party candidate and a non-party affiliated candidate won at least one county.

Perot's 18.9% of the popular vote made him the most successful non-major party presidential candidate in terms of popular vote since Theodore Roosevelt in the 1912 election. His share of the popular vote was also the highest ever for a candidate who did not win any electoral votes. Although he did not win any states, Perot managed to finish ahead of one of the major party candidates in two states: In Maine, he received 30.44% of the vote to Bush's 30.39% (Clinton won Maine with 38.77%); in Utah, which Bush won with 43.36% of the popular vote, Perot collected 27.34% of the vote to Clinton's 24.65%. Perot also came in 2nd in Maine's 2nd Congressional District, where he had his best overall showing, winning 33.2% of the vote there and missing the district's 1 elector by only 4.6% of the vote.

The election was the most recent in which Montana voted for the Democratic candidate, both the last time Florida backed the losing candidate and last time Georgia voted for the Democratic candidate until 2020, and the last time that Colorado voted Democratic until 2008. This was also the first time since Texas' admission to the Union in 1845 that a Democrat won the White House without winning the state, and the second time a Democrat won the White House without North Carolina (the first was 1844), and the second time since Florida's admission (also in 1845) that a Democrat won without winning the state (Kennedy in 1960 was the first).

Clinton became the second Democrat to win every electoral vote in the Northeast, the first being Lyndon B. Johnson in 1964. John Kerry and Barack Obama have been the only Democrats to repeat this since. Also, this was the first time since 1964 that the following nine states had voted Democratic: California, Colorado, Illinois, Montana, Nevada, New Hampshire, New Jersey, New Mexico, and Vermont.

The 168 electoral votes received by Bush, added to the 426 electoral votes he received in 1988, gave him the most total electoral votes received by any candidate who was elected to the office of president only once (594), and the tenth largest number of electoral votes received by any candidate who was elected to the office of president behind Grover Cleveland's 664, Barack Obama's 697, Woodrow Wilson's 712, Bill Clinton's 749, Donald Trump's 848, Dwight Eisenhower's 899, Ronald Reagan's 1,015, Richard Nixon's 1,040 and Franklin D. Roosevelt's 1,876 total electoral votes.

Bush and Clinton achieved an exact tie in Ware County, Georgia, the most recent time in American history a county was tied between the two major-party presidential candidates. Perot also achieved an exact tie with Bush in Morris County, Kansas.

=== Analysis ===
Several factors made the results possible. First, the campaign came on the heels of an economic slowdown. Exit polling showed that 75% thought the economy was in fairly or very bad shape while 63% thought their personal finances were better or the same as four years ago. The decision by Bush to accept a tax increase adversely affected his re-election bid. Pressured by rising budget deficits, Bush agreed to a budget compromise with Congress which raised taxes and reduced the federal budget deficit. Clinton was able to condemn the tax increase effectively on both its own merits and as a reflection of Bush's dishonesty. Effective Democratic TV ads were aired showing a clip of Bush's 1988 acceptance speech in which he promised "Read my lips ... No new taxes." Most importantly, Bush's coalition was in disarray, for both the aforementioned reasons and for unrelated reasons. The end of the Cold War allowed old rivalries among conservatives to re-emerge and meant that other voters focused more on domestic policy, to the detriment of Bush, a social and fiscal moderate. The consequence of such a perception depressed conservative turnout.

The election was compared to the 1945 United Kingdom general election, in which Winston Churchill, while a respected conservative wartime leader (like Bush) was not regarded as a good peacetime leader, and thus was voted out once the conflict was over.

Unlike Bush, Clinton was able to unite his fractious and ideologically diverse party behind his candidacy, even when its different wings conflicted. To garner the support of moderates and conservative Democrats, he attacked Sister Souljah, an obscure rap musician whose lyrics Clinton condemned. Furthermore, Clinton made clear his support of the death penalty and would later champion making school uniforms in public schools a requirement. Clinton could also point to his centrist record as governor of Arkansas. More liberal Democrats were impressed by Clinton's record on abortion and affirmative action. His strong connections to African Americans also played a key role. In addition, he organized significant numbers of young voters and became a symbol of the rise of the baby boomer generation to political power. Supporters remained energized and confident, even in times of scandal or missteps.

The effect of Ross Perot's candidacy has been a contentious point of debate for many years. In the ensuing months after the election, various Republicans asserted that Perot had acted as a spoiler, enough to the detriment of Bush to lose him the election. While many disaffected conservatives may have voted for Ross Perot to protest Bush's tax increase, further examination of the Perot vote in the Election Night exit polls not only showed that Perot siphoned votes nearly equally among Bush and Clinton, but roughly two-thirds of those voters who cited Bush's broken "No New Taxes" pledge as "very important" (25%) voted for Bill Clinton. The voting numbers reveal that to win the electoral vote Bush would have had to win 10 of the 11 states Clinton won by less than five percentage points. For Bush to earn a majority of the popular vote, he would have needed 12.2% of Perot's 18.9% of the vote, 65% of Perot's support base. State exit polls suggested that Perot did not alter the electoral college count, except potentially in one state (Ohio), which nonetheless showed a result in the margin of error. Furthermore, Perot was most popular in states that strongly favored either Clinton or Bush, limiting his real electoral impact for either candidate.

Perot gained relatively little support in the Southern states and happened to have the best showing in states with few electoral votes. Perot appealed to disaffected voters all across the political spectrum who had grown weary of the two-party system. NAFTA played a role in Perot's support, and Perot voters were relatively moderate on hot-button social issues. A 1999 study in the American Journal of Political Science estimated that Perot's candidacy hurt the Clinton campaign, reducing "Clinton's margin of victory over Bush by seven percentage point." In 2016, FiveThirtyEight noted that it was "unlikely" that Perot was a spoiler.

Clinton, Bush, and Perot did not focus on abortion during the campaign. Exit polls, however, showed that attitudes toward abortion "significantly influenced" the vote, as pro-choice Republicans defected from Bush.

The South was the only region where Bush received a majority of the electoral votes and two-thirds of his total electoral votes came from the South.

=== Implications ===
According to Seymour Martin Lipset, this election had several unique characteristics. Voters felt that economic conditions were worse than they actually were, which harmed Bush. A rare event was a strong third-party candidate. Liberals launched a backlash against 12 years of a conservative White House. The chief factor was Clinton's uniting his party, and winning over a number of heterogeneous groups.

Clinton's election ended an era in which the Republican Party had controlled the White House for 12 consecutive years, and for 20 of the previous 24 years. The election also brought the Democrats full control of the legislative and executive branches of the federal government, including both houses of U.S. Congress and the presidency, for the first time since the administration of the last Democratic president, Jimmy Carter. This would not last for very long, however, as the Republicans won control of both the House and Senate in 1994. Reelected in 1996, Clinton would become the first Democratic president since Franklin D. Roosevelt to serve two full terms in the White House and the first to leave office at the end of his second full term since Woodrow Wilson.

1992 was arguably a political realignment election. It made the Democratic Party dominant in presidential elections in the Northeast, the Great Lakes region, and the West Coast, where many states had previously either been swing states or Republican-leaning. Clinton picked up several states that went Republican in 1988, and which have remained in the Democratic column ever since: California, Connecticut, Delaware, Illinois, most of Maine (besides the state's second congressional district, which broke the state's total straight Democratic voting record since, when it voted for Republican presidential candidate Donald Trump in 2016, along with the two following presidential elections in 2020, and 2024), Maryland, New Jersey, and Vermont. Vermont, carried by Clinton, had been heavily Republican for generations prior to the election, voting for a Democrat only once (in 1964). The state has been won by the Democratic nominee in every presidential election since. Bill Clinton narrowly defeated Bush in New Jersey (by two points), which had voted for the Republican nominee all but twice since 1948. Clinton would later win the state in 1996 by eighteen points; like Vermont, Republicans have not won the state since. California, which had been a Republican stronghold since 1952, was now trending Democratic. Clinton, a native Southerner, was able to carry several states in the South that the GOP had won for much of the past two decades, but ultimately won only four of eleven former Confederate states. This reflected the final shift of the South to the Republican Party. In subsequent presidential elections from 1996 to 2020, 28 out of the 50 states were carried by the same party as in 1992 (15 for the Democrats and 13 for the Republicans).

=== Detailed results ===
Electoral results
Presidential candidate	Party	Home state	Popular vote		Electoral vote	Running mate		
Presidential candidate	Party	Home state	Count	Percentage	Electoral vote	Vice-presidential candidate	Home state	Electoral vote
Bill Clinton	Democratic	Arkansas	44,909,889	43.01%	370	Al Gore	Tennessee	370
George H. W. Bush (incumbent)	Republican	Texas	39,104,550	37.45%	168	Dan Quayle (incumbent)	Indiana	168
Ross Perot	Independent	Texas	19,743,821	18.91%	0	James Stockdale	California	0
Andre Marrou	Libertarian	Alaska	290,087	0.28%	0	Nancy Lord	Nevada	0
Bo Gritz	Populist	Nevada	106,152	0.10%	0	Cyril Minett	New Mexico	0
Lenora Fulani	New Alliance Party	New York	73,622	0.07%	0	Maria Elizabeth Muñoz	California	0
Howard Phillips	U.S. Taxpayers Party	Virginia	43,369	0.04%	0	Albion W. Knight Jr.	Florida	0
Other			152,516	0.13%	—	Other		—
Total			104,423,923	100%	538			538
Needed to win					270			270

Source (Popular Vote): Leip, David. "1992 Presidential Election Results". Dave Leip's Atlas of U.S. Presidential Elections.

Source (Electoral Vote): "Electoral College Box Scores 1789–1996". National Archives and Records Administration.

Popular vote
Clinton	43.01%
Bush	37.45%
Perot	18.91%
Marrou	0.28%
Others	0.35%

Electoral vote
Clinton	68.77%
Bush	31.23%

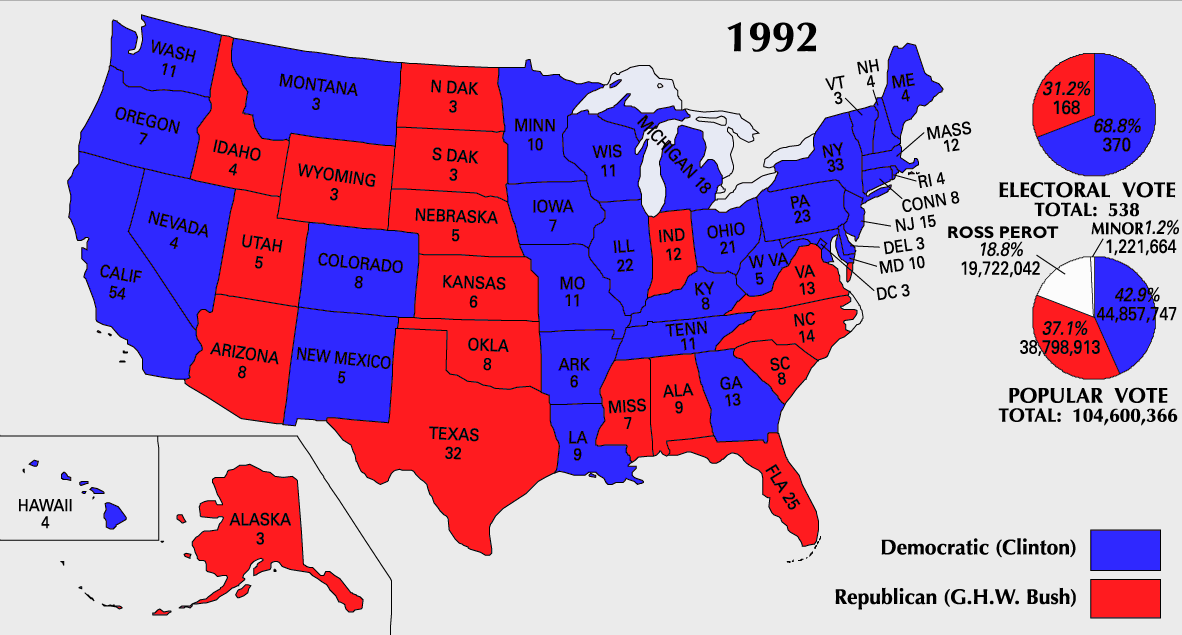

Results by county, shaded according to winning candidate's percentage of the vote
Results by congressional district, shaded according to winning candidate's percentage of the vote

County swing from 1988 to 1992

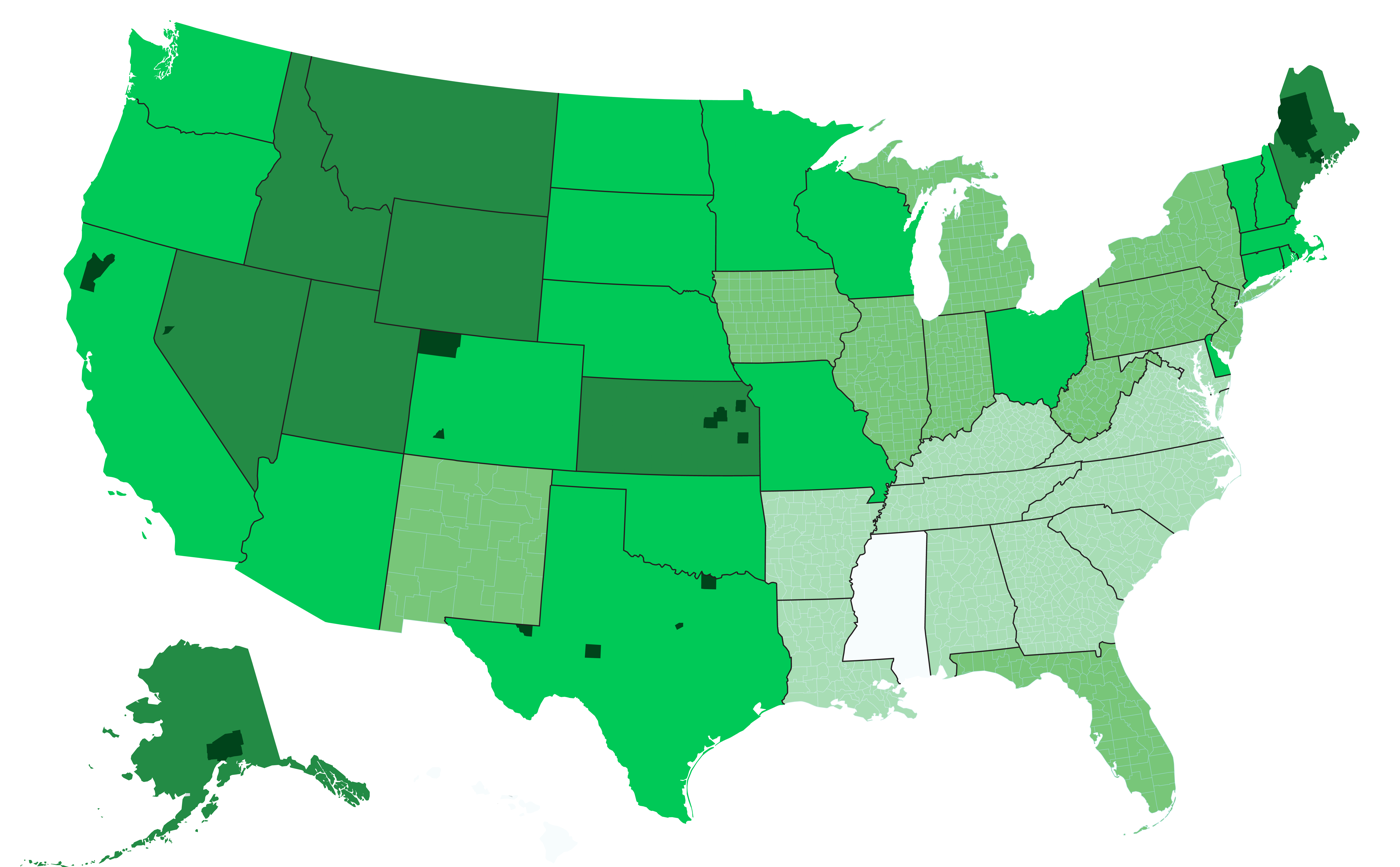
Results by state and county, shaded according to third place candidate's both maximum of >30% of the vote and victory status

=== Results by state ===
Legend
States/districts won by Clinton/Gore
States/districts won by Bush/Quayle
†	At-large results (For states that split electoral votes)

		Candidates with electoral votes (E)						Candidates with no electoral votes						Overall popular vote				
		Bill Clinton Democratic			George H.W. Bush Republican			Ross Perot Independent		Andre Marrou Libertarian		Others		Top-2 margin (+/− if won by D/R)		Margin Swing (Note: Percentage point difference in margin from the 1988 election)	State Total	
State	E	Vote	%	E	Vote	%	E	Vote	%	Vote	%	Vote	%	Vote	%	%	Vote	
Alabama	9	690,080	40.88	–	804,283	47.65	9	183,109	10.85	5,737	0.34	4,851	0.29	−114,203	−6.77	12.53	1,688,060	AL
Alaska	3	78,294	30.29	–	102,000	39.46	3	73,481	28.43	1,378	0.53	3,353	1.29	−23,706	−9.17	14.15	258,506	AK
Arizona	8	543,050	36.52	–	572,086	38.47	8	353,741	23.79	6,759	0.45	11,339	0.76	−29,036	−1.95	19.26	1,486,975	AZ
Arkansas	6	505,823	53.21	6	337,324	35.48	–	99,132	10.43	1,261	0.13	7,113	0.75	168,499	17.73	31.91	950,653	AR
California	54	5,121,325	46.01	54	3,630,574	32.61	–	2,296,006	20.63	48,139	0.43	35,677	0.32	1,490,751	13.40	16.97	11,131,721	CA
Colorado	8	629,681	40.13	8	562,850	35.87	–	366,010	23.32	8,669	0.55	1,970	0.13	66,831	4.26	12.04	1,569,180	CO
Connecticut	8	682,318	42.21	8	578,313	35.78	–	348,771	21.58	5,391	0.33	1,539	0.10	104,005	6.43	11.53	1,616,332	CT
Delaware	3	126,055	43.51	3	102,313	35.31	–	59,213	20.44	935	0.32	1,219	0.42	23,742	8.19	20.59	289,735	DE
D.C.	3	192,619	84.64	3	20,698	9.10	–	9,681	4.25	467	0.21	4,107	1.80	171,921	75.54	7.20	227,572	DC
Florida	25	2,072,798	39.00	–	2,173,310	40.89	25	1,053,067	19.82	15,079	0.28	238	0.00	−100,512	−1.89	20.47	5,314,392	FL
Georgia	13	1,008,966	43.47	13	995,252	42.88	–	309,657	13.34	7,110	0.31	140	0.01	13,714	0.59	20.84	2,321,125	GA
Hawaii	4	179,310	48.09	4	136,822	36.70	–	53,003	14.22	1,119	0.30	2,588	0.69	42,488	11.39	1.87	372,842	HI
Idaho	4	137,013	28.42	–	202,645	42.03	4	130,395	27.04	1,167	0.24	10,922	2.27	−65,632	−13.61	12.46	482,142	ID
Illinois	22	2,453,350	48.58	22	1,734,096	34.34	–	840,515	16.64	9,218	0.18	12,978	0.26	719,254	14.24	16.32	5,050,157	IL
Indiana	12	848,420	36.79	–	989,375	42.91	12	455,934	19.77	7,936	0.34	4,206	0.18	−140,955	−6.12	14.04	2,305,871	IN
Iowa	7	586,353	43.29	7	504,891	37.27	–	253,468	18.71	1,076	0.08	8,819	0.65	81,462	6.02	−4.20	1,354,607	IA
Kansas	6	390,434	33.74	–	449,951	38.88	6	312,358	26.99	4,314	0.37	179	0.02	−59,517	−5.14	8.09	1,157,236	KS
Kentucky	8	665,104	44.55	8	617,178	41.34	–	203,944	13.66	4,513	0.30	2,161	0.14	47,926	3.21	14.85	1,492,900	KY
Louisiana	9	815,971	45.58	9	733,386	40.97	–	211,478	11.81	3,155	0.18	26,027	1.45	82,585	4.61	14.82	1,790,017	LA
Maine †	2	263,420	38.77	2	206,504	30.39	–	206,820	30.44	1,681	0.25	1,074	0.16	56,600	8.33	19.83	679,499	ME
Maine-1	1	145,191	39.9	1	115,697	31.8	–	102,828	28.3	–	–	–	–	29,494	8.11	20.83	363,716	ME1
Maine-2	1	118,229	37.8	1	90,807	29.0	–	103,992	33.2	–	–	–	–	14,237	4.55	18.92	313,028	ME2
Maryland	10	988,571	49.80	10	707,094	35.62	–	281,414	14.18	4,715	0.24	3,252	0.16	281,477	14.18	17.09	1,985,046	MD
Massachusetts	12	1,318,639	47.54	12	805,039	29.02	–	630,731	22.74	9,021	0.32	10,234	0.37	513,600	18.52	10.67	2,773,664	MA
Michigan	18	1,871,182	43.77	18	1,554,940	36.38	–	824,813	19.30	10,175	0.24	13,563	0.32	316,242	7.39	15.29	4,274,673	MI
Minnesota	10	1,020,997	43.48	10	747,841	31.85	–	562,506	23.96	3,373	0.14	13,230	0.56	273,156	11.63	4.61	2,347,947	MN
Mississippi	7	400,258	40.77	–	487,793	49.68	7	85,626	8.72	2,154	0.22	5,962	0.61	−87,535	−8.91	11.91	981,793	MS
Missouri	11	1,053,873	44.07	11	811,159	33.92	–	518,741	21.69	7,497	0.31	295	0.01	242,714	10.15	14.13	2,391,565	MO
Montana	3	154,507	37.63	3	144,207	35.12	–	107,225	26.11	986	0.24	3,686	0.90	10,300	2.51	8.38	410,611	MT
Nebraska †	2	217,344	29.40	–	344,346	46.58	2	174,687	23.63	1,344	0.18	1,562	0.21	−127,002	−17.18	3.78	739,283	NE
Nebraska-1	1	80,696	32.6	–	107,081	43.2	1	59,974	24.2	–	–	–	–	-28,847	-10.6	-	247,751	NE1
Nebraska-2	1	78,701	32.4	–	115,255	47.5	1	48,657	20.1	–	–	–	–	-32,226	-15.1	-	242,613	NE2
Nebraska-3	1	57,467	23.5	–	121,342	49.7	1	65,473	26.8	–	–	–	–	-55,869	-22.9	-	244,282	NE3
Nevada	4	189,148	37.36	4	175,828	34.73	–	132,580	26.19	1,835	0.36	6,927	1.37	13,320	2.63	23.57	506,318	NV
New Hampshire	4	209,040	38.86	4	202,484	37.64	–	121,337	22.56	3,548	0.66	1,536	0.29	6,556	1.22	27.38	537,945	NH
New Jersey	15	1,436,206	42.95	15	1,356,865	40.58	–	521,829	15.61	6,822	0.20	21,872	0.65	79,341	2.37	16.01	3,343,594	NJ
New Mexico	5	261,617	45.90	5	212,824	37.34	–	91,895	16.12	1,615	0.28	2,035	0.36	48,793	8.56	13.52	569,986	NM
New York	33	3,444,450	49.72	33	2,346,649	33.88	–	1,090,721	15.75	13,451	0.19	31,662	0.46	1,097,801	15.85	11.75	6,926,933	NY
North Carolina	14	1,114,042	42.65	–	1,134,661	43.44	14	357,864	13.70	5,171	0.20	112	0.00	−20,619	−0.79	15.47	2,611,850	NC
North Dakota	3	99,168	32.18	–	136,244	44.22	3	71,084	23.07	416	0.14	1,221	0.40	−37,076	−12.04	1.02	308,133	ND
Ohio	21	1,984,942	40.18	21	1,894,310	38.35	–	1,036,426	20.98	7,252	0.15	17,034	0.34	90,632	1.83	12.68	4,939,964	OH
Oklahoma	8	473,066	34.02	–	592,929	42.65	8	319,878	23.01	4,486	0.32	–	–	−119,863	−8.63	8.02	1,390,359	OK
Oregon	7	621,314	42.48	7	475,757	32.53	–	354,091	24.21	4,277	0.29	7,204	0.49	145,557	9.95	5.28	1,462,643	OR
Pennsylvania	23	2,239,164	45.15	23	1,791,841	36.13	–	902,667	18.20	21,477	0.43	4,661	0.09	447,323	9.02	11.34	4,959,810	PA
Rhode Island	4	213,302	47.04	4	131,601	29.02	–	105,045	23.16	571	0.13	2,959	0.65	81,701	18.02	6.31	453,478	RI
South Carolina	8	479,514	39.88	–	577,507	48.02	8	138,872	11.55	2,719	0.23	3,915	0.33	−97,993	−8.14	15.78	1,202,527	SC
South Dakota	3	124,888	37.14	–	136,718	40.66	3	73,295	21.80	814	0.24	539	0.16	−11,830	−3.52	2.82	336,254	SD
Tennessee	11	933,521	47.08	11	841,300	42.43	–	199,968	10.09	1,847	0.09	6,002	0.30	92,221	4.65	20.99	1,982,638	TN
Texas	32	2,281,815	37.08	–	2,496,071	40.56	32	1,354,781	22.01	19,699	0.32	1,652	0.03	−214,256	−3.48	9.12	6,154,018	TX
Utah	5	183,429	24.65	–	322,632	43.36	5	203,400	27.34	1,900	0.26	32,638	4.39	−119,232	−16.03	15.46	743,999	UT
Vermont	3	133,592	46.11	3	88,122	30.42	–	65,991	22.78	501	0.17	1,495	0.52	45,470	15.70	19.22	289,701	VT
Virginia	13	1,038,650	40.59	–	1,150,517	44.97	13	348,639	13.63	5,730	0.22	15,129	0.59	−111,867	−4.38	16.12	2,558,665	VA
Washington	11	993,039	43.40	11	731,235	31.96	–	541,780	23.68	7,533	0.33	14,641	0.64	261,804	11.44	9.85	2,288,228	WA
West Virginia	5	331,001	48.41	5	241,974	35.39	–	108,829	15.91	1,873	0.27	–	–	89,027	13.02	8.28	683,677	WV
Wisconsin	11	1,041,066	41.13	11	930,855	36.78	–	544,479	21.51	2,877	0.11	11,837	0.47	110,211	4.35	0.73	2,531,114	WI
Wyoming	3	68,160	33.98	–	79,347	39.56	3	51,263	25.56	844	0.42	973	0.49	−11,187	−5.58	16.94	200,587	WY
TOTALS:	538	44,909,889	43.01	370	39,104,545	37.45	168	19,742,267	18.91	291,628	0.28	378,330	0.36	5,805,344	5.56	13.29	104,426,659	US

^{†}Maine and Nebraska each allowed their electoral votes to be split between candidates using the Congressional District Method for electoral vote assignment. In both states, two electoral votes were awarded to the winner of the statewide race and one electoral vote was awarded to the winner of each congressional district. District results for Maine and Nebraska do not include results for Marrou or other candidates and so totals differ from those for the states' at-large. Because Perot finished in 2nd place in some districts, the margins of the districts do not match the margin at-large. Nebraska split its electoral votes this way for the first time.

==== States that flipped from Republican to Democratic ====
- Arkansas
- California
- Colorado
- Connecticut
- Delaware
- Georgia
- Illinois
- Kentucky
- Louisiana
- Maine
- Maryland
- Michigan
- Missouri
- Montana
- Nevada
- New Jersey
- New Hampshire
- New Mexico
- Ohio
- Pennsylvania
- Tennessee
- Vermont

=== Close states ===
States with margin of victory less than 1% (27 electoral votes):

1. Georgia – 0.59% (13,714 votes)
2. North Carolina – 0.79% (20,619 votes)

States/Districts with margin of victory less than 5% (175 electoral votes):

1. New Hampshire – 1.22% (6,556 votes)
2. Ohio – 1.83% (90,632 votes)
3. Florida – 1.89% (100,612 votes)
4. Arizona – 1.95% (29,036 votes)
5. New Jersey – 2.37% (79,341 votes)
6. Montana – 2.51% (10,300 votes)
7. Nevada – 2.63% (13,320 votes)
8. Kentucky – 3.21% (47,926 votes)
9. Texas – 3.48% (214,256 votes)
10. South Dakota – 3.52% (11,830 votes)
11. Colorado – 4.26% (66,831 votes)
12. Wisconsin – 4.35% (110,211 votes)
13. Virginia – 4.37% (111,867 votes)
14. Maine's 2nd Congressional District – 4.54% (14,237 votes) (margin over Ross Perot)
15. Louisiana – 4.61% (82,585 votes)
16. Tennessee – 4.65% (92,221 votes) (tipping point state)

States with margin of victory between 5% and 10% (131 electoral votes):

1. Kansas – 5.14% (59,517 votes)
2. Wyoming – 5.60% (11,187 votes)
3. Iowa – 6.02% (81,462 votes)
4. Indiana – 6.12% (140,955 votes)
5. Connecticut – 6.43% (104,005 votes)
6. Alabama – 6.77% (114,203 votes)
7. Michigan – 7.39% (316,242 votes)
8. South Carolina – 8.14% (97,993 votes)
9. Maine's 1st Congressional District – 8.11% (29,494 votes)
10. Delaware – 8.19% (23,741 votes)
11. Maine – 8.33% (56,600 votes) (margin over Ross Perot)
12. New Mexico – 8.56% (48,793 votes)
13. Oklahoma – 8.63% (119,863 votes)
14. Mississippi – 8.91% (87,535 votes)
15. Pennsylvania – 9.02% (447,323 votes)
16. Alaska – 9.17% (23,706 votes)
17. Oregon – 9.95% (145,557 votes)

Source: New York Times President Map

==== Statistics ====
Counties with Highest Percent of Vote (Democratic)

1. Washington, D.C. 84.64%
2. Starr County, Texas 82.80%
3. Macon County, Alabama 82.78%
4. Duval County, Texas 79.56%
5. Jefferson County, Mississippi 79.39%

Counties with Highest Percent of Vote (Republican)

1. Jackson County, Kentucky 74.96%
2. Sioux County, Iowa 72.21%
3. Hansford County, Texas 69.08%
4. Ochiltree County, Texas 68.06%
5. Shelby County, Alabama 67.97%

Counties with Highest Percent of Vote (Other)

1. Loving County, Texas 46.88%
2. San Juan County, Colorado 40.40%
3. Billings County, North Dakota 39.82%
4. Somerset County, Maine 38.95%
5. Esmeralda County, Nevada 37.67%

== Voter demographics ==
Presidential vote in social groups (in percentage)
Social group	Clinton	Bush	Perot	% of total vote
Total vote	43	37	19	100
Party and ideology
Conservative Republicans	5	82	13	21
Moderate Republicans	16	63	21	13
Liberal Republicans	16	54	30	2
Conservative Independents	17	53	30	7
Moderate Independents	42	28	30	15
Liberal Independents	54	16	29	4
Conservative Democrats	61	23	16	6
Moderate Democrats	76	9	15	20
Liberal Democrats	85	11	5	13
Gender and marital status
Married men	37	42	21	33
Married women	41	40	19	33
Unmarried men	48	29	22	15
Unmarried women	53	31	15	19
Race
White	39	40	20	84
Black	83	10	7	10
Hispanic	61	25	14	4
Asian	30	55	15	1
Religion
White Protestant	32	47	21	46
Catholic	44	35	20	29
Jewish	80	11	9	3
Born Again, religious right	23	61	15	17
Age
18–29 years old	43	34	22	17
30–44 years old	41	38	21	33
45–59 years old	41	40	19	26
60 and older	50	38	12	24
Education
Not a high school graduate	54	28	18	6
High school graduate	43	36	21	24
Some college education	41	37	21	27
College graduate	39	41	20	26
Post graduate education	50	36	14	17
Family income
Under $15,000	58	23	19	13
$15,000–29,999	45	35	20	27
$30,000–49,999	41	38	21	26
$50,000-$75,000	41	42	17	19
Over $75,000	36	48	16	15
Region
East	47	35	18	23
Midwest	42	37	21	26
South	41	43	16	30
West	43	34	23	20
Community size
Population over 500,000	58	28	13	10
Population 50,000 to 500,000	50	33	16	21
Suburbs	40	39	21	39
Rural areas, towns	39	40	20	30

Source: Voter News Service exit poll, reported in The New York Times, November 10, 1996, 28.

== See also ==
- Newspaper endorsements in the 1992 United States presidential election
- Chicken George
- "Giant sucking sound"
- "It's the economy, stupid"
- "Read my lips: no new taxes"
- 1992 United States gubernatorial elections
- 1992 United States Senate elections
- 1992 United States House of Representatives elections
- List of 1992 United States presidential electors
- Presidency of Bill Clinton

== Notes ==
- "Outline of U.S. History: Chapter 15: Bridge to the 21st century". Official web site of the U.S. Department of State. Archived from the original on December 14, 2005.
  - Bulk of article text as of January 9, 2003 copied from this page, when it was located at http://usinfo.state.gov/usa/infousa/facts/history/ch13.htm#1992 and titled "An Outline of American History: Chapter 13: Toward the 21st century".
  - An
  - This page is in the public domain as a government publication.

== Works cited ==
- Abramson, Paul; Aldrich, John; Rohde, David (1995). Change and Continuity in the 1992 Elections. CQ Press. ISBN 0871878399.
- Gallup, Jr., George (1993). The Gallup Poll, Public Opinion 1992. Wilmington, Delaware: Scholarly Resources Inc.
