= 1992 United States presidential election in Arkansas =

- November 3, 1992

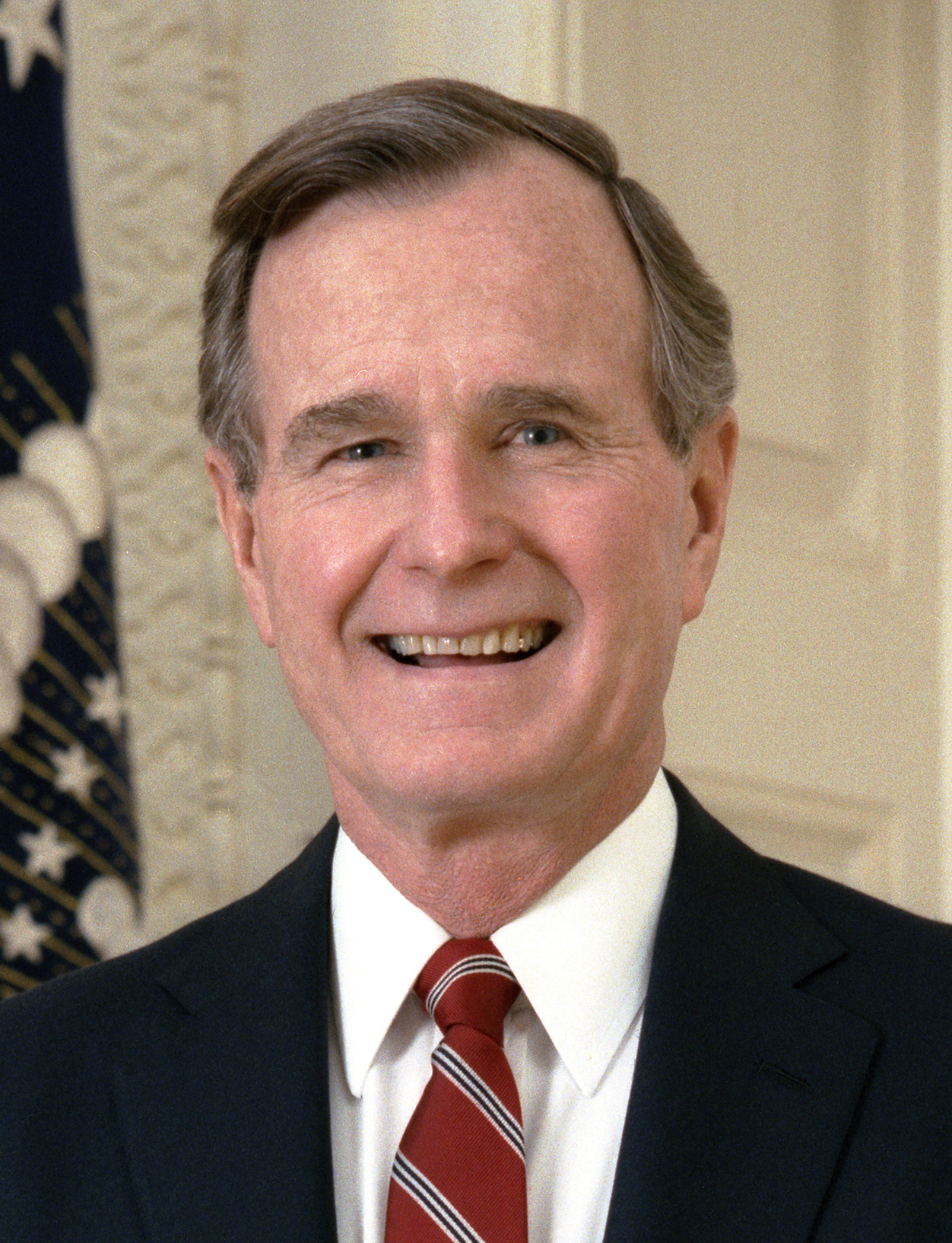

Nominee	Bill Clinton	George H. W. Bush	Ross Perot
Party	Democratic	Republican	Independent
Home state	Arkansas	Texas	Texas
Running mate	Al Gore	Dan Quayle	James Stockdale
Electoral vote	6	0	0
Popular vote	505,823	337,324	99,132
Percentage	53.21%	35.48%	10.43%

Clinton
40–50%
50–60%
60–70%
70–80%
Bush
40–50%
President before election
George H. W. Bush
Republican
Elected President
Bill Clinton
Democratic

The 1992 United States presidential election in Arkansas took place on November 3, 1992, as part of the 1992 United States presidential election. State voters chose six representatives, or electors to the Electoral College, who voted for president and vice president.

Arkansas was won by incumbent Governor Bill Clinton (D) with 53.21% of the popular vote over incumbent President George H. W. Bush (R-Texas) with 35.48%. Businessman Ross Perot (I-Texas) finished in third, with 10.43% of the popular vote. Clinton thus won his home state by a wide margin of 17.73%, becoming the first Democratic candidate to win the state since Jimmy Carter in 1976. Arkansas and Washington, D.C., which Clinton also won, were the only contests in 1992 in which any candidate received an absolute majority of the popular vote.

Among white voters, 50% supported Clinton, while 40% supported Bush.

== Background ==
The Republican presidential nominee won Arkansas in the 1980, 1984, and 1988 presidential elections. Democratic Governor Bill Clinton was elected to a fifth term in 1990.

== Primary ==
=== Democratic ===
Clinton announced his presidential campaign on October 3, 1991, at the Old State House. Polling by Mason-Dixon Polling & Strategy one week before the primary showed Jerry Brown had a disapproval rate of 71% among likely Democratic voters while Clinton's was 13%.

Turnout in the Democratic primary was greater than it was in 1980, 1984, and 1988, but lower than in 1976.

=== Republican ===
Turnout in the Republican primary declined from 1988, but was still greater than 1976, 1980, and 1984. Three-fourth of the votes in the primary came from Arkansas's 3rd congressional district. Less than 100 votes were cast in 39 of the state's counties.

== General election ==
=== Predictions ===
Source	Rating	As of
The Cook Political Report	Solid D (flip)	October 28, 1992

=== Results ===
Clinton carried all but five counties (Benton, Crawford, Pope, Searcy, and Sebastian) in the state. As of the 2024 presidential election, this is the last election in which Baxter County, Carroll County, Newton County, Boone County, and Polk County have voted for a Democratic presidential candidate. This is also the most recent time that Arkansas has voted more Democratic than Maryland.

Arkansas would be one of only three states, along with the District of Columbia, where Clinton's raw vote total exceeded that of Bush and Perot combined, the others being Maryland and New York. This is also the most recent election in which Arkansas trended more Democratic relative to the nation, or swung towards the Democratic party at all. Clinton's 505,823 votes are the most votes received by a Democratic presidential candidate in the state's history.

Democratic U.S. Senator Dale Bumpers won reelection in a concurrent election. The Republicans gained one seat in Arkansas' U.S. House delegation, Arkansas House of Representatives, and Arkansas Senate.

1992 United States presidential election in Arkansas
Party	Candidate	Votes	Percentage	Electoral votes
Democratic	Bill Clinton	505,823	53.21%	6
Republican	George H. W. Bush (incumbent)	337,324	35.48%	0
Independent Party	Ross Perot	99,132	10.43%	0
Taxpayers’	Howard Phillips	1,437	0.15%	0
Libertarian	Andre Marrou	1,261	0.13%	0
New Alliance Party	Lenora Fulani	1,022	0.11%	0
The Apathy Party	Honest Jim Boren	956	0.10%	0
America First	James "Bo" Gritz	819	0.09%	0
Natural Law	Dr. John Hagelin	764	0.08%	0
Justice, Industry, Agriculture	Lyndon LaRouche	762	0.08%	0
Take Back America	John Yiamouyiannis	554	0.06%	0
Prohibition	Earl Dodge	472	0.05%	0
Looking Back	Isabell Masters	327	0.03%	0
Totals		950,683	100.0%	6

=== Results by county ===
County	Bill Clinton Democratic		George H.W. Bush Republican		Ross Perot Independent		Various candidates Other parties		Margin		Total votes cast
County	#	%	#	%	#	%	#	%	#	%	Total votes cast
Arkansas	4,709	59.01%	2,594	32.51%	639	8.01%	38	0.48%	2,115	26.50%	7,980
Ashley	5,876	61.42%	2,686	28.08%	931	9.73%	74	0.77%	3,190	33.34%	9,567
Baxter	6,991	44.44%	5,640	35.85%	2,938	18.68%	163	1.04%	1,351	8.59%	15,732
Benton	15,774	36.45%	21,126	48.81%	6,128	14.16%	251	0.58%	-5,352	-12.36%	43,279
Boone	6,128	42.45%	6,094	42.21%	2,079	14.40%	136	0.94%	34	0.24%	14,437
Bradley	2,954	61.07%	1,482	30.64%	391	8.08%	10	0.21%	1,472	30.43%	4,837
Calhoun	1,389	51.41%	1,047	38.75%	257	9.51%	9	0.33%	342	12.66%	2,702
Carroll	3,769	42.55%	3,535	39.91%	1,500	16.94%	53	0.60%	234	2.64%	8,857
Chicot	3,504	68.72%	1,242	24.36%	347	6.81%	6	0.12%	2,262	44.36%	5,099
Clark	5,767	64.64%	2,403	26.93%	714	8.00%	38	0.43%	3,364	37.71%	8,922
Clay	4,848	68.47%	1,647	23.26%	568	8.02%	17	0.24%	3,201	45.21%	7,080
Cleburne	5,090	51.00%	3,580	35.87%	1,263	12.66%	47	0.47%	1,510	15.13%	9,980
Cleveland	1,893	56.04%	1,127	33.36%	337	9.98%	21	0.62%	766	22.68%	3,378
Columbia	4,747	48.35%	3,702	37.70%	1,090	11.10%	280	2.85%	1,045	10.65%	9,819
Conway	4,898	57.75%	2,719	32.06%	803	9.47%	61	0.72%	2,179	25.69%	8,481
Craighead	13,931	54.43%	9,104	35.57%	2,274	8.88%	287	1.12%	4,827	18.86%	25,596
Crawford	6,656	41.18%	6,882	42.57%	2,442	15.11%	185	1.14%	-226	-1.39%	16,165
Crittenden	9,683	56.60%	5,910	34.55%	848	4.96%	667	3.90%	3,773	22.05%	17,108
Cross	4,058	58.09%	2,303	32.97%	602	8.62%	23	0.33%	1,755	25.12%	6,986
Dallas	2,107	53.68%	1,458	37.15%	345	8.79%	15	0.38%	649	16.53%	3,925
Desha	3,815	67.87%	1,279	22.75%	392	6.97%	135	2.40%	2,536	45.12%	5,621
Drew	3,748	59.51%	1,938	30.77%	596	9.46%	16	0.25%	1,810	28.74%	6,298
Faulkner	13,000	51.56%	9,491	37.64%	2,437	9.66%	287	1.14%	3,509	13.92%	25,215
Franklin	3,217	47.76%	2,495	37.04%	987	14.65%	37	0.55%	722	10.72%	6,736
Fulton	2,827	59.69%	1,258	26.56%	631	13.32%	20	0.42%	1,569	33.13%	4,736
Garland	18,811	52.26%	12,886	35.80%	3,475	9.65%	823	2.29%	5,925	16.46%	35,995
Grant	3,190	51.47%	2,272	36.66%	702	11.33%	34	0.55%	918	14.81%	6,198
Greene	7,541	61.20%	3,510	28.49%	1,213	9.84%	58	0.47%	4,031	32.71%	12,322
Hempstead	5,476	61.38%	2,387	26.75%	1,022	11.45%	37	0.41%	3,089	34.63%	8,922
Hot Spring	6,308	59.42%	3,036	28.60%	1,209	11.39%	63	0.59%	3,272	30.82%	10,616
Howard	2,764	55.56%	1,728	34.73%	466	9.37%	17	0.34%	1,036	20.83%	4,975
Independence	7,083	55.16%	4,232	32.96%	1,444	11.25%	81	0.63%	2,851	22.20%	12,840
Izard	3,419	61.18%	1,532	27.42%	606	10.84%	31	0.55%	1,887	33.76%	5,588
Jackson	4,944	65.71%	1,864	24.77%	673	8.94%	43	0.57%	3,080	40.94%	7,524
Jefferson	21,819	68.85%	7,525	23.74%	2,067	6.52%	281	0.89%	14,294	45.11%	31,692
Johnson	3,951	52.14%	2,563	33.82%	1,013	13.37%	51	0.67%	1,388	18.32%	7,578
Lafayette	2,273	57.12%	1,188	29.86%	504	12.67%	14	0.35%	1,085	27.26%	3,979
Lawrence	4,146	59.84%	2,124	30.65%	636	9.18%	23	0.33%	2,022	29.19%	6,929
Lee	3,436	67.82%	1,293	25.52%	308	6.08%	29	0.57%	2,143	42.30%	5,066
Lincoln	2,805	64.53%	1,142	26.27%	390	8.97%	10	0.23%	1,663	38.26%	4,347
Little River	3,327	58.18%	1,483	25.94%	890	15.56%	18	0.31%	1,844	32.24%	5,718
Logan	3,995	45.99%	3,408	39.23%	1,220	14.04%	64	0.74%	587	6.76%	8,687
Lonoke	7,963	50.32%	6,253	39.52%	1,554	9.82%	54	0.34%	1,710	10.80%	15,824
Madison	2,415	45.76%	2,238	42.41%	598	11.33%	26	0.49%	177	3.35%	5,277
Marion	2,757	44.15%	2,023	32.39%	1,327	21.25%	138	2.21%	734	11.76%	6,245
Miller	7,050	48.21%	5,273	36.06%	2,249	15.38%	51	0.35%	1,777	12.15%	14,623
Mississippi	10,046	62.94%	4,697	29.43%	981	6.15%	238	1.49%	5,349	33.51%	15,962
Monroe	2,578	60.35%	1,324	30.99%	355	8.31%	15	0.35%	1,254	29.36%	4,272
Montgomery	1,904	51.29%	1,205	32.46%	576	15.52%	27	0.73%	699	18.83%	3,712
Nevada	2,242	56.79%	1,217	30.83%	455	11.52%	34	0.86%	1,025	25.96%	3,948
Newton	1,765	42.59%	1,730	41.75%	608	14.67%	41	0.99%	35	0.84%	4,144
Ouachita	7,411	59.69%	3,711	29.89%	1,238	9.97%	55	0.44%	3,700	29.80%	12,415
Perry	1,906	54.39%	1,162	33.16%	412	11.76%	24	0.68%	744	21.23%	3,504
Phillips	6,456	65.63%	2,695	27.40%	634	6.45%	52	0.53%	3,761	38.23%	9,837
Pike	2,168	51.23%	1,577	37.26%	472	11.15%	15	0.35%	591	13.97%	4,232
Poinsett	5,341	62.31%	2,425	28.29%	761	8.88%	44	0.51%	2,916	34.02%	8,571
Polk	3,162	43.81%	2,757	38.20%	1,225	16.97%	73	1.01%	405	5.61%	7,217
Pope	7,704	43.13%	8,056	45.10%	1,989	11.14%	113	0.63%	-352	-1.97%	17,862
Prairie	2,366	59.81%	1,154	29.17%	434	10.97%	2	0.05%	1,212	30.64%	3,956
Pulaski	79,482	58.03%	47,789	34.89%	8,751	6.39%	935	0.68%	31,693	23.14%	136,957
Randolph	3,921	62.10%	1,766	27.97%	578	9.15%	49	0.78%	2,155	34.13%	6,314
St. Francis	6,548	61.57%	3,289	30.93%	766	7.20%	32	0.30%	3,259	30.64%	10,635
Saline	12,671	49.38%	10,105	39.38%	2,751	10.72%	134	0.52%	2,566	10.00%	25,661
Scott	2,228	48.84%	1,695	37.15%	610	13.37%	29	0.64%	533	11.69%	4,562
Searcy	1,679	42.14%	1,772	44.48%	503	12.63%	30	0.75%	-93	-2.34%	3,984
Sebastian	16,570	41.78%	16,817	42.40%	6,023	15.19%	249	0.63%	-247	-0.62%	39,659
Sevier	2,558	51.05%	1,592	31.77%	643	12.83%	218	4.35%	966	19.28%	5,011
Sharp	3,761	52.27%	2,486	34.55%	921	12.80%	28	0.39%	1,275	17.72%	7,196
Stone	2,622	52.03%	1,672	33.18%	697	13.83%	48	0.95%	950	18.85%	5,039
Union	8,786	47.29%	7,305	39.32%	1,919	10.33%	570	3.07%	1,481	7.97%	18,580
Van Buren	3,819	51.88%	2,612	35.48%	888	12.06%	42	0.57%	1,207	16.40%	7,361
Washington	22,029	46.01%	20,292	42.38%	5,304	11.08%	255	0.53%	1,737	3.63%	47,880
White	10,494	48.67%	8,538	39.60%	2,366	10.97%	165	0.77%	1,956	9.07%	21,563
Woodruff	2,589	74.08%	676	19.34%	227	6.49%	3	0.09%	1,913	54.74%	3,495
Yell	4,165	54.49%	2,506	32.79%	940	12.30%	32	0.42%	1,659	21.70%	7,643
Totals	505,823	53.21%	337,324	35.48%	99,132	10.43%	8,374	0.88%	168,499	17.73%	950,653

==== Counties that flipped from Republican to Democratic ====
- Arkansas
- Baxter
- Boone
- Calhoun
- Carroll
- Cleburne
- Cleveland
- Columbia
- Craighead
- Crittenden
- Cross
- Drew
- Faulkner
- Franklin
- Garland
- Grant
- Greene
- Hempstead
- Howard
- Independence
- Izard
- Johnson
- Lawrence
- Logan
- Lonoke
- Madison
- Marion
- Miller
- Mississippi
- Montgomery
- Newton
- Ouachita
- Perry
- Pike
- Polk
- Prairie
- Pulaski
- Saline
- Scott
- Sevier
- Sharp
- Stone
- Union
- Van Buren
- Washington
- White
- Yell

== See also ==
- United States presidential elections in Arkansas
- Presidency of Bill Clinton

== Works cited ==
- Steed, Robert; Moreland, Laurence; Baker, Tod, eds. (1994). The 1992 Presidential Election in the South: Current Patterns of Southern Party and Electoral Politics. Praeger Publishers. ISBN 0275945340.
