= 1992 United States presidential election in New York =

- November 3, 1992

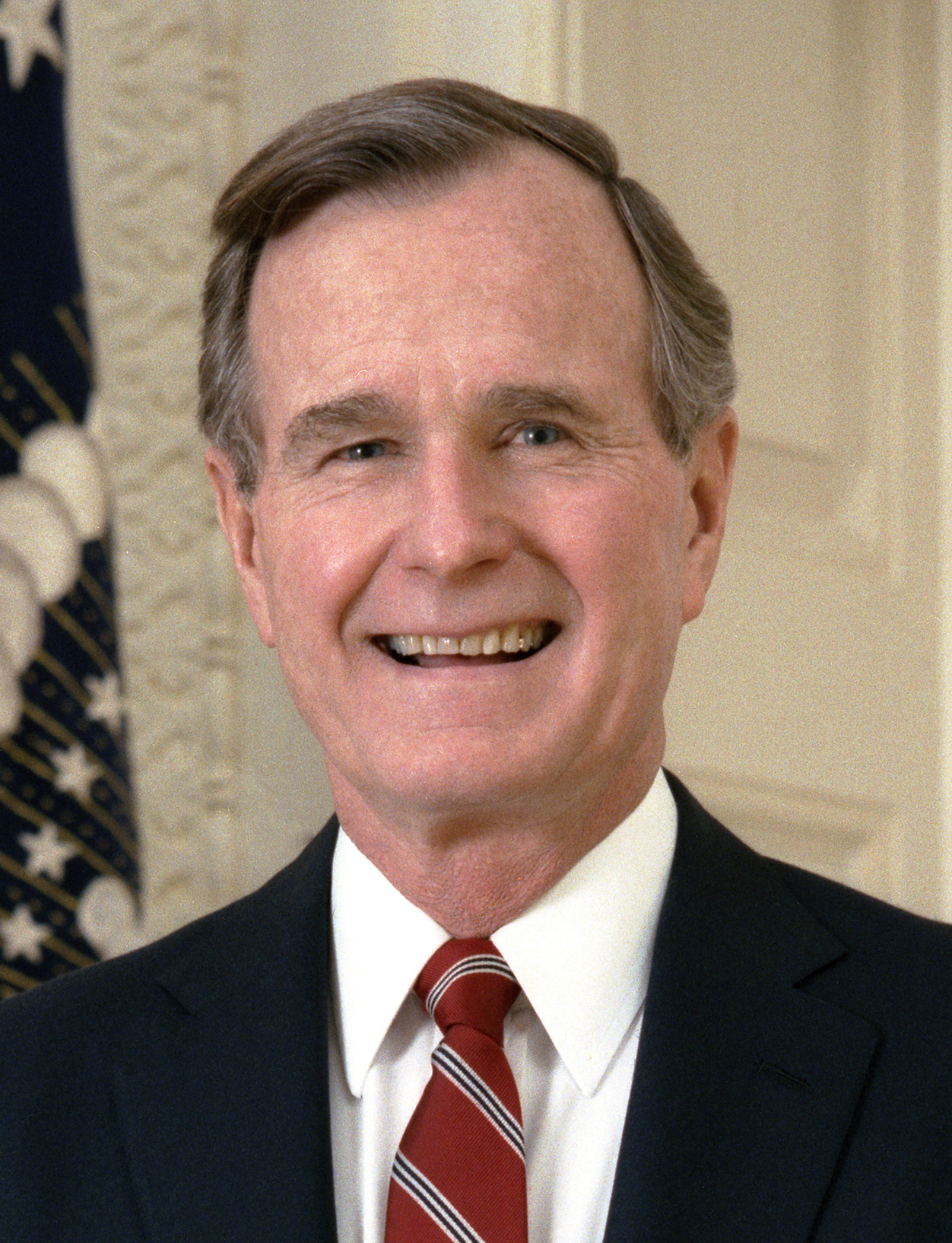

Nominee	Bill Clinton	George H. W. Bush	Ross Perot
Party	Democratic	Republican	Independent
Alliance	Liberal	Parties: Conservative; Right to Life
Home state	Arkansas	Texas	Texas
Running mate	Al Gore	Dan Quayle	James Stockdale
Electoral vote	33	0	0
Popular vote	3,444,450	2,346,649	1,090,721
Percentage	49.73%	33.88%	15.75%

Clinton
30–40%
40–50%
50–60%
60–70%
70–80%
Bush
30–40%
40–50%
50–60%
60–70%
Perot
30–40%
40–50%
Tie
President before election
George H. W. Bush
Republican
Elected President
Bill Clinton
Democratic

The 1992 United States presidential election in New York took place on November 3, 1992, as part of the 1992 United States presidential election. Voters chose 33 representatives, or electors to the Electoral College, who voted for president and vice president.

New York was won by the Democratic candidate, Governor Bill Clinton of Arkansas who received 49.73% of the vote over incumbent Republican President George H. W. Bush of Texas, who received 33.88%. Independent candidate Ross Perot, a billionaire Texas businessman, finished in third, with 15.75% of the popular vote. Clinton ultimately won the national election, defeating incumbent President Bush.

Clinton's double-digit 15.85% margin of victory would mark the beginning of a dramatic shift toward the Democratic Party in New York, from a Democratic leaning swing state to a solidly blue state that Democrats would carry by landslide margins in every subsequent election (with the exception of Kamala Harris' lukewarm 12.4% victory in 2024). In the preceding six elections, the state had gone Republican three times and Democratic three times, all but once decided by a single-digit margin. In the 7 elections that have followed 1992 until 2024, Democratic presidential candidates have received between 58% and 64% of the vote, making it one of the most overwhelmingly Democratic states in the nation, largely as a result of trends that began in 1992.

Despite Ross Perot's strong showing as a third-party candidate, taking votes away from the major party nominees statewide and nationally, Clinton increased the total Democratic vote share in the five heavily populated boroughs of New York City to 69% in 1992, compared to the 66% received by Democrat Michael Dukakis in the 1988 election, while Bush fell from 33% in 1988 to only 24% in his re-election bid. This was the last presidential election until 2020 in which the Bronx was not the most Democratic county in New York.

In addition, Clinton also picked up wins in heavily populated suburban counties around New York City that had long been reliably Republican, namely Westchester County just north of the city, and Nassau County on Long Island, which have remained loyally Democratic in every election that has followed until Nassau County voted for Trump in 2024, as well as Rockland County. Bush only carried Suffolk County by 1.5%, down from a landslide 21.8% victory margin in that county in 1988. Republican dominance of the populous suburbs had been crucial to previous Republican victories in the state in order to overcome the massive Democratic advantage in New York City. As the city became even more Democratic while downstate suburban voters defected from the GOP to the Democrats, Republican hopes of competing in New York State would vanish following this election.

Bush performed more strongly in traditionally Republican upstate New York, where he won most rural counties, although he lost a number of counties that he had won in 1988 against Dukakis. Clinton won a handful of rural upstate counties, and more significantly scored strong wins in counties home to the cities of Albany, Buffalo, Rochester, Syracuse, and the college town of Ithaca, all of which have become reliable Democratic bastions in upstate New York. Clinton thus became the first Democrat since 1964 (and only the third since 1852) to win the state outside the five boroughs of New York City, which has been replicated by every Democratic presidential candidate until 2024.

== Primaries ==
=== Democratic primary ===
During the 1992 primaries in New York and Wisconsin, Jerry Brown who had taken the lead in polls in both states, made a gaffe: when he announced to an audience of various leaders of New York City's Jewish community that, if nominated, he would consider Jesse Jackson as his running mate. Jackson had previously been widely accused of antisemitism for comments that he had made. Brown's polling numbers suffered. On April 7, he lost narrowly to Bill Clinton in Wisconsin (37%–34%), and dramatically in New York (41%–26%).

== Results ==
1992 United States presidential election in New York
Party	Candidate	Votes	Percentage	Electoral votes
Democratic	Bill Clinton	3,346,894	48.32%	
Liberal	Bill Clinton	97,556	1.41%	
Total	Bill Clinton	3,444,450	49.73%	33
Republican	George H. W. Bush	2,041,690	29.47%	
Conservative	George H. W. Bush	177,000	2.56%	
Right to Life	George H. W. Bush	127,959	1.85%	
Total	George H. W. Bush (incumbent)	2,346,649	33.88%	0
Independent	Ross Perot	1,090,721	15.75%	0
Socialist Workers	James Warren	15,924	0.23%	0
Libertarian	Andre Marrou	13,451	0.19%	0
New Alliance	Lenora Fulani	11,269	0.16%	0
Natural Law	Dr. John Hagelin	4,017	0.06%	0
Peace and Freedom	Ron Daniels (write-in)	385	0.01%	0
America First	James "Bo" Gritz (write-in)	25	0.00%	0
Democrats for Economic Recovery	Lyndon LaRouche (write-in)	18	0.00%	0
Independent	J. Quinn Brisben (write-in)	16	0.00%	0
Totals		6,926,925	100.0%	33

=== New York City results ===
1992 Presidential Election in New York City		Manhattan	The Bronx	Brooklyn	Queens	Staten Island	Total	
Democratic- Liberal	Bill Clinton	416,142	225,038	411,183	349,520	56,901	1,458,784	68.73%
Democratic- Liberal	Bill Clinton	78.27%	73.67%	70.70%	62.87%	38.51%	1,458,784	68.73%
Republican- Conservative- Right to Life	George H. W. Bush	84,501	63,310	133,344	157,561	70,707	509,423	24.00%
Republican- Conservative- Right to Life	George H. W. Bush	15.89%	20.73%	22.93%	28.34%	47.85%	509,423	24.00%
Independent	Ross Perot	27,689	15,115	33,014	46,014	19,678	141,510	6.67%
Independent	Ross Perot	5.21%	4.95%	5.68%	8.28%	13.32%	141,510	6.67%
New Alliance	Lenora Fulani	1,380	1,298	2,461	1,466	143	6,748	0.32%
New Alliance	Lenora Fulani	0.26%	0.42%	0.42%	0.26%	0.10%	6,748	0.32%
Libertarian	Andre Marrou	1,358	349	967	898	245	3,817	0.18%
Libertarian	Andre Marrou	0.26%	0.11%	0.17%	0.16%	0.17%	3,817	0.18%
Socialist Workers	James Warren	466	206	408	273	43	1,396	0.07%
Socialist Workers	James Warren	0.09%	0.07%	0.07%	0.05%	0.03%	1,396	0.07%
Natural Law	John Hagelin	217	206	217	224	43	907	0.04%
Natural Law	John Hagelin	0.04%	0.07%	0.04%	0.04%	0.03%	907	0.04%
TOTAL		531,673	305,460	581,594	555,956	147,760	2,122,443	100.00%

=== Results by county ===
County	Bill Clinton Democratic		George H. W. Bush Republican		Ross Perot Independent		Various candidates Other parties		Margin		Total votes cast
County	#	%	#	%	#	%	#	%	#	%	Total votes cast
Albany	80,641	51.90%	49,452	31.83%	24,064	15.49%	1,206	0.78%	31,189	20.07%	155,363
Allegany	4,848	25.90%	8,976	47.95%	4,703	25.12%	192	1.03%	-4,128	-22.05%	18,719
Bronx	225,038	73.67%	63,310	20.73%	15,115	4.95%	1,997	0.65%	161,728	52.94%	305,460
Broome	43,444	43.51%	34,653	34.71%	21,280	21.31%	469	0.47%	8,791	8.80%	99,846
Cattaraugus	10,150	28.92%	13,944	39.74%	10,662	30.38%	336	0.96%	3,282 (Note: In this county where Perot ran second ahead of Clinton, margin given is Bush vote minus Perot vote.)	9.36%	35,092
Cayuga	13,088	36.69%	12,065	33.82%	10,279	28.82%	239	0.67%	1,023	2.87%	35,671
Chautauqua	22,645	36.07%	21,222	33.80%	18,455	29.39%	467	0.74%	1,423	2.27%	62,789
Chemung	15,099	38.58%	16,088	41.11%	7,493	19.15%	455	1.16%	-989	-2.53%	39,135
Chenango	8,017	36.80%	8,114	37.24%	5,356	24.58%	300	1.38%	-97	-0.44%	21,787
Clinton	12,881	40.27%	13,455	42.06%	5,389	16.85%	263	0.82%	-574	-1.79%	31,988
Columbia	11,368	39.12%	11,568	39.81%	5,829	20.06%	291	1.00%	-200	-0.69%	29,056
Cortland	7,815	37.48%	7,782	37.32%	5,098	24.45%	156	0.75%	33	0.16%	20,851
Delaware	7,152	34.84%	8,829	43.01%	4,404	21.45%	145	0.71%	-1,677	-8.17%	20,530
Dutchess	41,655	36.12%	46,709	40.50%	26,320	22.82%	644	0.56%	-5,054	-4.38%	115,328
Erie	196,233	43.46%	129,444	28.67%	123,358	27.32%	2,461	0.55%	66,789	14.79%	451,496
Essex	6,717	35.40%	8,278	43.63%	3,784	19.94%	194	1.02%	-1,561	-8.23%	18,973
Franklin	7,654	41.68%	6,635	36.13%	3,857	21.00%	219	1.19%	1,019	5.55%	18,365
Fulton	8,400	36.77%	9,137	40.00%	5,120	22.41%	188	0.82%	-737	-3.23%	22,845
Genesee	8,071	30.78%	11,663	44.47%	6,192	23.61%	299	1.14%	-3,592	-13.69%	26,225
Greene	6,924	32.67%	9,390	44.31%	4,689	22.13%	188	0.89%	-2,466	-11.64%	21,191
Hamilton	963	25.23%	2,038	53.39%	793	20.78%	23	0.60%	-1,075	-28.16%	3,817
Herkimer	10,880	36.34%	12,052	40.26%	6,866	22.93%	141	0.47%	-1,172	-3.92%	29,939
Jefferson	13,380	35.75%	14,227	38.01%	9,461	25.28%	358	0.96%	-847	-2.26%	37,426
Kings	411,183	70.70%	133,344	22.93%	33,014	5.68%	4,053	0.70%	277,839	47.77%	581,594
Lewis	3,676	33.32%	4,101	37.17%	3,164	28.68%	91	0.82%	-425	-3.85%	11,032
Livingston	8,648	32.25%	12,122	45.21%	5,775	21.54%	269	1.00%	-3,474	-12.96%	26,814
Madison	10,099	34.78%	11,293	38.90%	7,391	25.46%	251	0.86%	-1,194	-4.12%	29,034
Monroe	141,502	41.57%	134,021	39.38%	63,229	18.58%	1,617	0.48%	7,481	2.19%	340,369
Montgomery	9,509	40.56%	8,802	37.55%	5,020	21.41%	112	0.48%	707	3.01%	23,443
Nassau	282,593	46.38%	246,881	40.52%	77,097	12.65%	2,755	0.45%	35,712	5.86%	609,326
New York	416,142	78.27%	84,501	15.89%	27,689	5.21%	3,441	0.65%	331,641	62.38%	531,673
Niagara	35,649	36.91%	30,401	31.48%	30,126	31.19%	408	0.42%	5,248	5.43%	96,584
Oneida	40,966	37.81%	43,806	40.43%	22,717	20.97%	853	0.79%	-2,840	-2.62%	108,342
Onondaga	90,645	42.18%	77,642	36.13%	45,175	21.02%	1,445	0.67%	13,003	6.05%	214,907
Ontario	16,064	35.79%	18,995	42.32%	9,571	21.32%	259	0.58%	-2,931	-6.53%	44,889
Orange	45,946	37.50%	53,493	43.66%	22,499	18.36%	582	0.48%	-7,547	-6.16%	122,520
Orleans	4,927	29.41%	7,468	44.57%	4,275	25.52%	84	0.50%	-2,541	-15.16%	16,754
Oswego	16,990	33.36%	18,530	36.38%	14,853	29.16%	558	1.10%	-1,540	-3.02%	50,931
Otsego	10,471	39.36%	10,141	38.12%	5,841	21.95%	153	0.58%	330	1.24%	26,606
Putnam	14,048	34.05%	18,934	45.89%	8,011	19.41%	270	0.65%	-4,886	-11.84%	41,263
Queens	349,520	62.87%	157,561	28.34%	46,014	8.28%	2,861	0.51%	191,959	34.53%	555,956
Rensselaer	29,793	39.95%	28,937	38.80%	15,198	20.38%	652	0.87%	856	1.15%	74,580
Richmond	56,901	38.51%	70,707	47.85%	19,678	13.32%	474	0.32%	-13,806	-9.34%	147,760
Rockland	56,759	46.59%	49,608	40.72%	15,026	12.33%	438	0.36%	7,151	5.87%	121,831
St. Lawrence	18,197	43.00%	13,901	32.85%	9,758	23.06%	461	1.09%	4,296	10.15%	42,317
Saratoga	33,011	36.76%	36,917	41.10%	19,091	21.26%	793	0.88%	-3,906	-4.34%	89,812
Schenectady	32,335	43.77%	26,258	35.55%	14,838	20.09%	439	0.59%	6,077	8.22%	73,870
Schoharie	4,997	35.32%	5,678	40.14%	3,327	23.52%	145	1.02%	-681	-4.82%	14,147
Schuyler	2,859	34.87%	3,226	39.35%	2,051	25.02%	63	0.77%	-367	-4.48%	8,199
Seneca	5,810	38.80%	5,432	36.28%	3,660	24.44%	72	0.48%	378	2.52%	14,974
Steuben	12,043	29.08%	19,761	47.72%	9,378	22.65%	228	0.55%	-7,718	-18.64%	41,410
Suffolk	220,811	38.88%	229,467	40.40%	112,973	19.89%	4,704	0.83%	-8,656	-1.52%	567,955
Sullivan	13,717	43.36%	11,396	36.02%	6,336	20.03%	186	0.59%	2,321	7.34%	31,635
Tioga	7,791	33.78%	9,287	40.26%	5,867	25.44%	120	0.52%	-1,496	-6.48%	23,065
Tompkins	23,197	55.68%	11,520	27.65%	6,704	16.09%	239	0.57%	11,677	28.03%	41,660
Ulster	32,886	40.69%	29,223	36.16%	17,952	22.21%	760	0.94%	3,663	4.53%	80,821
Warren	9,820	34.14%	12,260	42.62%	6,401	22.25%	286	0.99%	-2,440	-8.48%	28,767
Washington	8,429	33.53%	10,305	41.00%	6,143	24.44%	258	1.03%	-1,876	-7.47%	25,135
Wayne	11,866	30.19%	18,019	45.84%	9,188	23.38%	233	0.59%	-6,153	-15.65%	39,306
Westchester	184,300	48.65%	151,990	40.12%	39,933	10.54%	2,617	0.69%	32,310	8.53%	378,840
Wyoming	4,045	24.70%	7,324	44.73%	4,837	29.54%	169	1.03%	2,487	15.19%	16,375
Yates	3,242	32.12%	4,366	43.26%	2,354	23.33%	130	1.29%	-1,124	-11.14%	10,092
Totals	3,444,450	49.73%	2,346,649	33.88%	1,090,721	15.75%	45,105	0.65%	1,097,801	15.85%	6,926,925

==== Counties that flipped from Republican to Democratic ====
- Cayuga
- Chautauqua
- Cortland
- Franklin
- Monroe
- Nassau
- Onondaga
- Otsego
- Rensselaer
- Rockland
- Seneca
- St. Lawrence
- Sullivan
- Ulster
- Westchester

== Analysis ==
New York would be one of only three states, along with Washington, D.C., where if Bush's and Perot's vote had been combined, Clinton would still come out on top. The other two states are Arkansas and Maryland. Clinton's victory margin would make New York State about 10% more Democratic than the nation as a whole in the 1992 election.

As of the 2024 presidential election, this is the last election in which Columbia County voted for a Republican presidential candidate. Suffolk County would not vote Republican again until 2016. Clinton County would not vote Republican again until 2024.

== See also ==
- United States presidential elections in New York
- Presidency of Bill Clinton
