= 1992 United States presidential election in Maryland =

- November 3, 1992
- Turnout: 81.18%

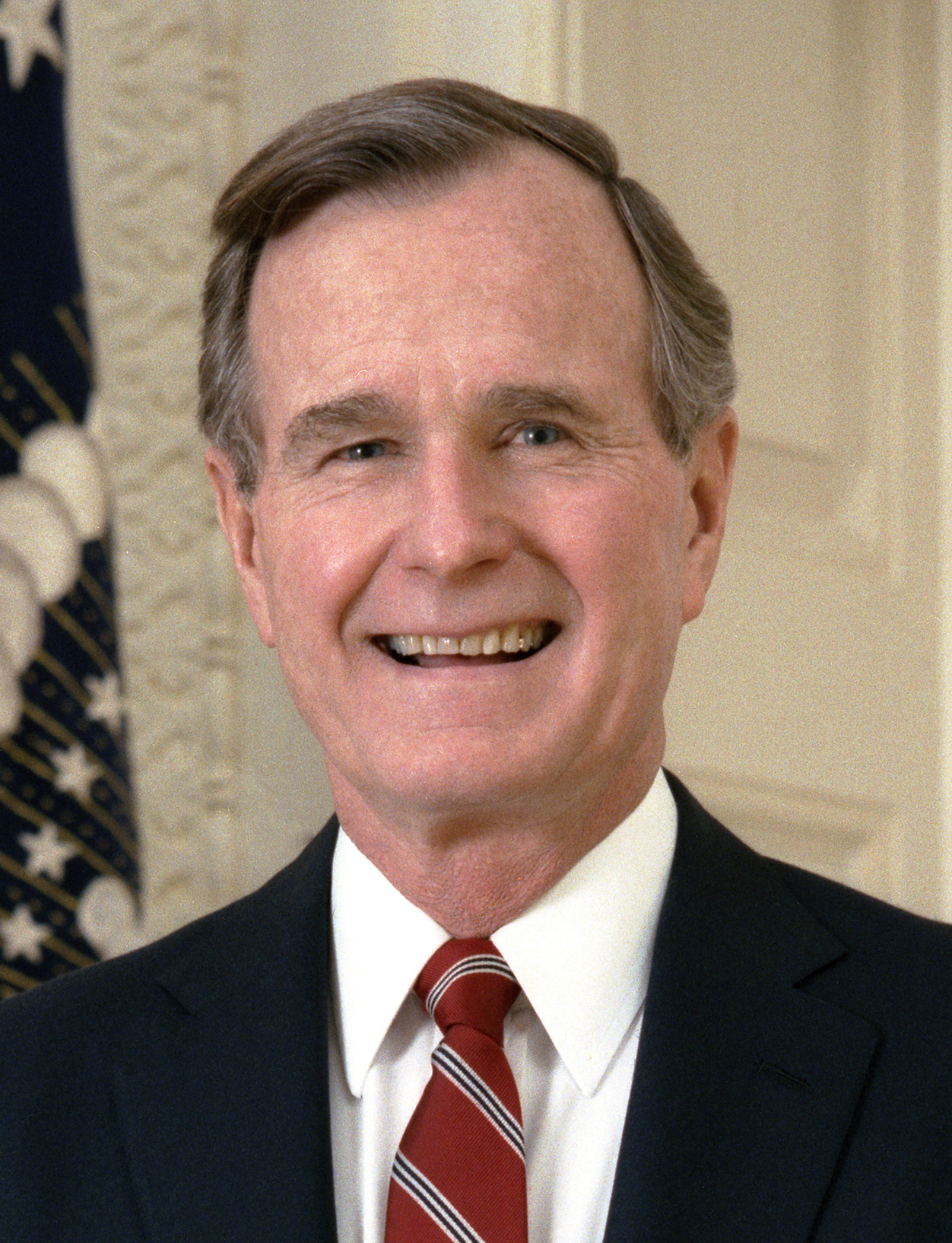

Nominee	Bill Clinton	George H. W. Bush	Ross Perot
Party	Democratic	Republican	Independent
Home state	Arkansas	Texas	Texas
Running mate	Al Gore	Dan Quayle	James Stockdale
Electoral vote	10	0	0
Popular vote	988,571	707,094	281,414
Percentage	49.80%	35.62%	14.18%
County results
Clinton
40–50%
50–60%
60–70%
70–80%
Bush
30–40%
40–50%
50–60%
President before election
George H. W. Bush
Republican
Elected President
Bill Clinton
Democratic

The 1992 United States presidential election in Maryland took place on November 3, 1992, as part of the 1992 United States presidential election. Voters chose 10 representatives, or electors to the Electoral College, who voted for president and vice president.

Maryland was won by Governor Bill Clinton (D-Arkansas) with 49.80% of the popular vote over incumbent President George H. W. Bush (R-Texas) with 35.62%. Businessman Ross Perot (I-Texas) finished in third, with 14.18% of the popular vote. Clinton ultimately won the national vote, defeating incumbent President Bush. In this election, Maryland voted 8.62% to the left of the nation at-large.

Although Clinton won only four of Maryland's 23 counties (and the independent city of Baltimore), the high raw vote totals from these heavily populated jurisdictions exceeded Bush's victories in largely rural and exurban counties. Maryland was one of only three states, along with New York and Clinton's native Arkansas (and Washington DC), where Clinton exceeded Bush and Perot's combined vote total, albeit by an extremely slim margin of 63 votes. This is also the most recent election when the Democratic candidate failed to win a majority of the state's popular vote.

This marks the last election as of 2024 in which both Charles County and Dorchester County voted for the same candidate. In 1996, Dorchester County would be flipped to the Democratic column by a plurality for the first time since 1960 and vote for every ensuing Republican, whilst Charles County would become one of only two counties in the entire nation to flip from supporting Bob Dole to support Al Gore, and never vote Republican again, due to its increasing African-American population.

== Results ==
1992 United States presidential election in Maryland
Party	Candidate	Votes	Percentage	Electoral votes
Democratic	Bill Clinton	988,571	49.80%	10
Republican	George H. W. Bush (Incumbent)	707,094	35.62%	0
Independent	Ross Perot	281,414	14.18%	0
Libertarian	Andre Marrou	4,715	0.24%	0
New Alliance	Lenora Fulani	2,786	0.14%	0
N/A	Write-ins	466	0.02%	0
Totals		1,985,046	100.0%	10

=== Results by county ===
County	Bill Clinton Democratic		George H.W. Bush Republican		Ross Perot Independent		Various candidates Other parties		Margin		Total votes cast
County	#	%	#	%	#	%	#	%	#	%	Total votes cast
Allegany	11,501	37.59%	13,862	45.31%	5,081	16.61%	151	0.49%	-2,361	-7.72%	30,595
Anne Arundel	68,629	36.97%	81,467	43.89%	35,191	18.96%	347	0.19%	-12,838	-6.92%	185,634
Baltimore	143,498	44.40%	126,728	39.21%	51,757	16.01%	1,237	0.38%	16,770	5.19%	323,220
Baltimore City	185,753	75.79%	40,725	16.62%	17,381	7.09%	1,228	0.50%	145,028	59.17%	245,087
Calvert	8,619	37.07%	10,026	43.12%	4,499	19.35%	105	0.45%	-1,407	-6.05%	23,249
Caroline	2,822	33.36%	3,856	45.58%	1,729	20.44%	53	0.63%	-1,034	-12.22%	8,460
Carroll	15,447	28.12%	28,405	51.71%	10,965	19.96%	112	0.20%	-12,958	-23.59%	54,929
Cecil	10,232	37.45%	10,784	39.47%	6,115	22.38%	188	0.69%	-552	-2.02%	27,319
Charles	14,498	37.70%	17,293	44.97%	6,501	16.91%	162	0.42%	-2,795	-7.27%	38,454
Dorchester	3,933	35.89%	4,934	45.03%	2,010	18.34%	80	0.73%	-1,001	-9.14%	10,957
Frederick	21,848	33.77%	31,290	48.37%	11,373	17.58%	180	0.28%	-9,442	-14.60%	64,691
Garrett	2,856	26.99%	5,714	54.01%	1,987	18.78%	23	0.22%	-2,858	-27.02%	10,580
Harford	27,164	33.67%	36,350	45.05%	17,002	21.07%	171	0.21%	-9,186	-11.38%	80,687
Howard	44,763	44.85%	38,594	38.67%	16,182	16.21%	259	0.26%	6,169	6.18%	99,798
Kent	3,093	40.55%	3,094	40.56%	1,411	18.50%	30	0.39%	-1	-0.01%	7,628
Montgomery	199,757	55.09%	119,705	33.01%	41,971	11.57%	1,180	0.33%	80,052	22.08%	362,613
Prince George's	168,691	65.67%	62,955	24.51%	23,355	9.09%	1,858	0.72%	105,736	41.16%	256,859
Queen Anne's	4,668	32.16%	6,829	47.05%	2,958	20.38%	59	0.41%	-2,161	-14.89%	14,514
Somerset	3,210	40.45%	3,450	43.47%	1,230	15.50%	46	0.58%	-240	-3.02%	7,936
St. Mary's	8,931	35.60%	11,485	45.78%	4,550	18.14%	119	0.47%	-2,554	-10.18%	25,085
Talbot	4,642	33.86%	6,774	49.42%	2,233	16.29%	59	0.43%	-2,132	-15.56%	13,708
Washington	16,495	35.70%	21,977	47.56%	7,537	16.31%	199	0.43%	-5,482	-11.86%	46,208
Wicomico	11,481	37.93%	13,560	44.79%	5,140	16.98%	91	0.30%	-2,079	-6.86%	30,272
Worcester	6,040	36.48%	7,237	43.70%	3,256	19.66%	26	0.16%	-1,197	-7.22%	16,559
Totals	988,571	49.80%	707,094	35.62%	281,414	14.18%	7,967	0.40%	281,477	14.18%	1,985,046

==== Counties that flipped from Republican to Democratic ====
- Baltimore
- Howard

== See also ==
- United States presidential elections in Maryland
- 1992 United States presidential election
- 1992 United States elections
