= Chicken Kiev speech =

1991 speech by U.S. president George H. W. Bush

Video of the speech

The Chicken Kiev speech is the nickname for a speech given by the United States president George H. W. Bush in Kiev, Ukraine, on August 1, 1991, three weeks before the Declaration of Independence of Ukraine (itself precipitated by the August Coup) and four months before the December independence referendum in which 92.26% of Ukrainians voted to withdraw from the Soviet Union. The Soviet Union collapsed 145 days after the speech, partially pushed by Ukraine. The address, in which Bush cautioned against "suicidal nationalism", was written by Condoleezza Rice—later Secretary of State under President George W. Bush—when she was in charge of Soviet and Eastern European affairs for the first President Bush. It outraged Ukrainian nationalists and American conservatives, with the conservative New York Times columnist William Safire calling it the "Chicken Kiev speech", named after the dish of stuffed chicken breast, in protest at what he saw as its "colossal misjudgment", weak tone and miscalculation.

== Background ==
George H. W. Bush

At the end of the 1980s and the start of the 1990s, pro-independence sentiment grew in Ukraine and other republics of the Soviet Union. The United States pursued a policy of non-interference. Bush looked to the Soviet president, Mikhail Gorbachev, to manage the process of reform and avoided giving support to nationalists in the republics. As Bush later wrote in his memoirs,

Whatever the course, however long the process took, and whatever its outcome, I wanted to see stable, and above all peaceful, change. I believed the key to this would be a politically strong Gorbachev and an effectively working central structure. The outcome depended on what Gorbachev was willing to do. If he hesitated at implementing the new agreement [i.e. the Union of Sovereign States treaty] with the republics, the political disintegration of the Union might speed up and destabilize the country ... If he appeared to compromise too much, it might provoke a coup—although there was no serious signs of one. I continued to worry about further violence inside the Soviet Union, and that we might be drawn into conflict.

On July 30, 1991, Bush arrived in Moscow for a summit with Mikhail Gorbachev. He and Barbara Bush stayed with Gorbachev and his wife, Raisa, in a dacha outside Moscow, where the two leaders held informal discussions. Bush told Gorbachev that it would not be in America's interest for the Soviet Union to collapse, though hardline members of Bush's Republican Party—most notably Secretary of Defense Dick Cheney—embraced this outcome. He assured Gorbachev that he would counsel against independence when he travelled on to Ukraine on August 1, on the next leg of his visit.

Sentiment in Ukraine was split between a range of views, from old-style communists to pro-independence nationalists. The Ukrainian president, Leonid Kravchuk, was a reformist communist who supported Ukrainian sovereignty within a less restrictive Soviet Union—a similar position to that of Russian president Boris Yeltsin. As Kravchuk put it prior to Bush's visit, "I am convinced that the Ukraine should be a sovereign, full-fledged and full-blooded state". Bush refused to meet with pro-independence leaders in Ukraine. As his motorcade passed through Kiev, it was greeted by large numbers of people waving Ukrainian and American flags but also protesters bearing slogans such as "Mr. Bush: billions for the USSR is slavery for Ukraine" and "The White House deals with Communists but snubs Rukh", the principal pro-independence party in Ukraine.

== Speech ==
The speech was delivered to the Supreme Soviet of the Ukrainian SSR, Ukraine's parliament, in Kiev. Bush endorsed an agreement reached the previous April between Gorbachev and nine of the republics, including Ukraine, that committed to a new Union Treaty establishing a more decentralised Soviet Union. He said that the agreement "holds forth the hope that republics will combine greater autonomy with greater voluntary interaction—political, social, cultural, economic rather than pursuing the hopeless course of isolation". He also praised Gorbachev, calling it a "false choice" to choose between the Soviet leader and pro-independence leaders: "In fairness, President Gorbachev has achieved astonishing things, and his policies of glasnost, perestroika and democratization point toward the goals of freedom, democracy and economic liberty."

Bush set out his policy towards reform in the Soviet Union: "I come here to tell you: we support the struggle in this great country for democracy and economic reform. In Moscow, I outlined our approach. We will support those in the center and the republics who pursue freedom, democracy and economic liberty." He warned against independence if it only changed a distant tyrant for a local one: "Americans will not support those who seek independence in order to replace a far-off tyranny with a local despotism. They will not aid those who promote a suicidal nationalism based upon ethnic hatred."

It was later reported that Bush himself had added the phrase "suicidal nationalism" to the speech which his staff had drafted, seeking to warn the Ukrainians about the need to avoid what was happening in Yugoslavia.

== Reactions ==
The speech was met with standing applause in the Ukrainian parliament, where majority of seats were held by the Communists. However, Bush's position was criticised by Ukrainian nationalists. Ivan Drach, the chairman of Rukh, told journalists that "President Bush seems to have been hypnotized by Gorbachev" and complained that the U.S. President "has consistently snubbed the democratic movements in the republics". Drach criticized the way that Bush had sided with the Soviet leader:

Bush came here in effect as a messenger for Gorbachev. In many ways, he sounded less radical than our own Communist politicians on the issue of state sovereignty for Ukraine. After all, they have to run for office here in Ukraine and he doesn't.

Another nationalist politician, Stepan Pavluk, complained that "Bush does not understand that we are fighting against a totalitarian state." He commented that Bush "talks a lot about freedom, but for us, it is practically impossible to conceive of freedom without independence. We have to create our own customs service and currency in order to protect our economy from total collapse." The speech also attracted criticism from nationalists elsewhere in the Soviet republics. The government of Georgia issued a statement declaring that "The heir of Washington, Jefferson, Lincoln and others arrives ... and carries on propaganda in favor of the Union Treaty. Why didn't he call on Kuwait to sign the Union Treaty with Iraq?"

Bush's speech also attracted criticism at home for being out of touch, though he was hardly alone in that; only the previous year, the British prime minister Margaret Thatcher had declared that she could no more open an embassy in Kiev than she could in San Francisco. The Boston Globe called it "Bush league in Kiev" in an editorial, criticising Bush for having "mired him[self] rather too deeply for comfort on one side of an internal national debate". The newspaper felt that Bush had been injudicious in his language, particularly using phrases such as "suicidal nationalism," "ethnic hatred" and "local despotism" that it felt "went too far". On August 29, 1991, William Safire used his New York Times column to label it the "Chicken Kiev" speech. Safire later commented that the speech had made Bush seem "anti-liberty" and jeopardized US relations with the "emerging European power" of Ukraine.

On February 8, 1992, The Economist said the speech was "the most flagrant example" of other nations failing to recognize the inevitability of Ukraine becoming an independent state. A man in a chicken suit appeared at numerous events during Bush's 1992 re-election campaign. Bush commented on the speech in 2004, explaining that he meant the Ukrainians should not do "something stupid", and that if their "leaders hadn't acted smartly, there would have been a crackdown" from Moscow. In 2005, Condoleezza Rice, responding to a question about the speech at a press conference, remarked that it was easy to see in hindsight what was wrong with the perspective of the speech, but that the peaceful breakup of a nuclear-armed Soviet Union was not so obvious in 1991. The conservative Washington Examiner opined in 2011 that it "may have been the worst speech ever by an American chief executive".
