= Chicken George (politics) =

Phrase from the 1992 United States presidential campaign

Chicken George was a campaign tactic in the 1992 U.S. presidential election, where one or more people in chicken costumes heckled President George H. W. Bush over his refusal to participate in a debate with Democratic candidate Bill Clinton and independent candidate Ross Perot.

== History ==
In 1992, Bush refused to agree to the debate format determined by the Commission on Presidential Debates. As late as September, the campaign was refusing to accept proposals from the commission.

Clinton supporters Derrick Parker and Corbett Edge O'Meara came up with the idea for Chicken George at a bar in Detroit, Michigan, on September 9, 1992. They devised a publicity stunt invoking the pejorative term "chicken" that involved renting a chicken costume and following Bush around, calling him too cowardly to debate. The following day, Parker appeared as the chicken outside the Detroit Economic Club, where Bush was giving a Labor Day speech. The Chicken did not speak, but was accompanied by O'Meara, who called himself Colonel James Baker III and acted as his spokesperson, "translating" the chicken sounds that Parker would make.

Their publicity efforts were eventually picked up by the national news media and included an ABC World News Tonight story interviewing the pair on a golf course in the Upper Peninsula. Soon the Clinton campaign was ensuring that a chicken would appear at each Bush event. Clinton political strategist James Carville wrote that "... there was a Michigan Chicken George, a Mississippi Chicken George, a Tennessee Chicken George. At first we recruited them, but real soon all the local people wanted to do it. Everybody wanted to be Chicken George. It was the way to get on TV. At War Room meetings we'd get a Chicken George report." Chicken Georges in Clarksville, Tennessee had signs that said "Read My Beak: Don't Be a Chicken. Debate." A Chicken George in Mississippi was arrested. Another in Shreveport, Louisiana, was unable to get through security until he showed them a sign that said "Poultry Workers for Bush." After he was inside the campaign event, he turned the sign around to reveal that it said "Chicken George".

Mary Matalin, Bush's deputy campaign manager for political operations, wrote that Bush thought the chicken was hilarious. She relates that he would find the chicken in the crowd and tell it fish jokes that poked fun at Clinton's environmental record. Bush would also send his advance people into the crowds to determine where the chicken was so he would know where to find it. Though staffers grew concerned after CNN aired footage of Bush talking to the chicken, the President did not want to stop.

The Bush campaign reciprocated, releasing live ducks at a Clinton campaign event while Bush supporters used duck calls. The campaign sought to draw attention to the notion that Bill Clinton had "ducked" the draft to avoid military service during the Vietnam War. A Bush campaign assistant secured 200 live chickens in preparation for a Clinton campaign event held in Madison, Wisconsin. The campaign had wanted ducks and not chickens, but compromised by pairing the chickens with duck calls.

During a whistle-stop tour of the Midwest, Bush engaged the Chicken, saying "you talking about the draft-record chicken or you talking about the chicken in the Arkansas River? Which one are you talking about? Which one? Get out of here." The interaction resulted in dozens of television news images, print reports, and a front page Sunday New York Times photograph.

Eventually, Bush agreed to participate in the debates and the chicken thus stopped shadowing him.

== Other campaign chickens ==
Since the 1992 election, many campaigns have deployed people in chicken costumes, usually to heckle candidates who are refusing to participate in debates. Soon-to-be British Prime Minister Tony Blair was mocked in a similar fashion during the British general election of 1997. Lee Cain, Boris Johnson's former Director of Communications, also previously dressed up as a chicken to taunt another soon-to-be PM, David Cameron, as well as the soon-to-be Chancellor George Osborne, while working for the Daily Mirror.

Politicians from the United States who have been shadowed by costumed chickens include George W. Bush and Jeanne Shaheen.

== See also ==
- Chicken Kiev speech
