= 1992 United States presidential election in the District of Columbia =

- November 3, 1992

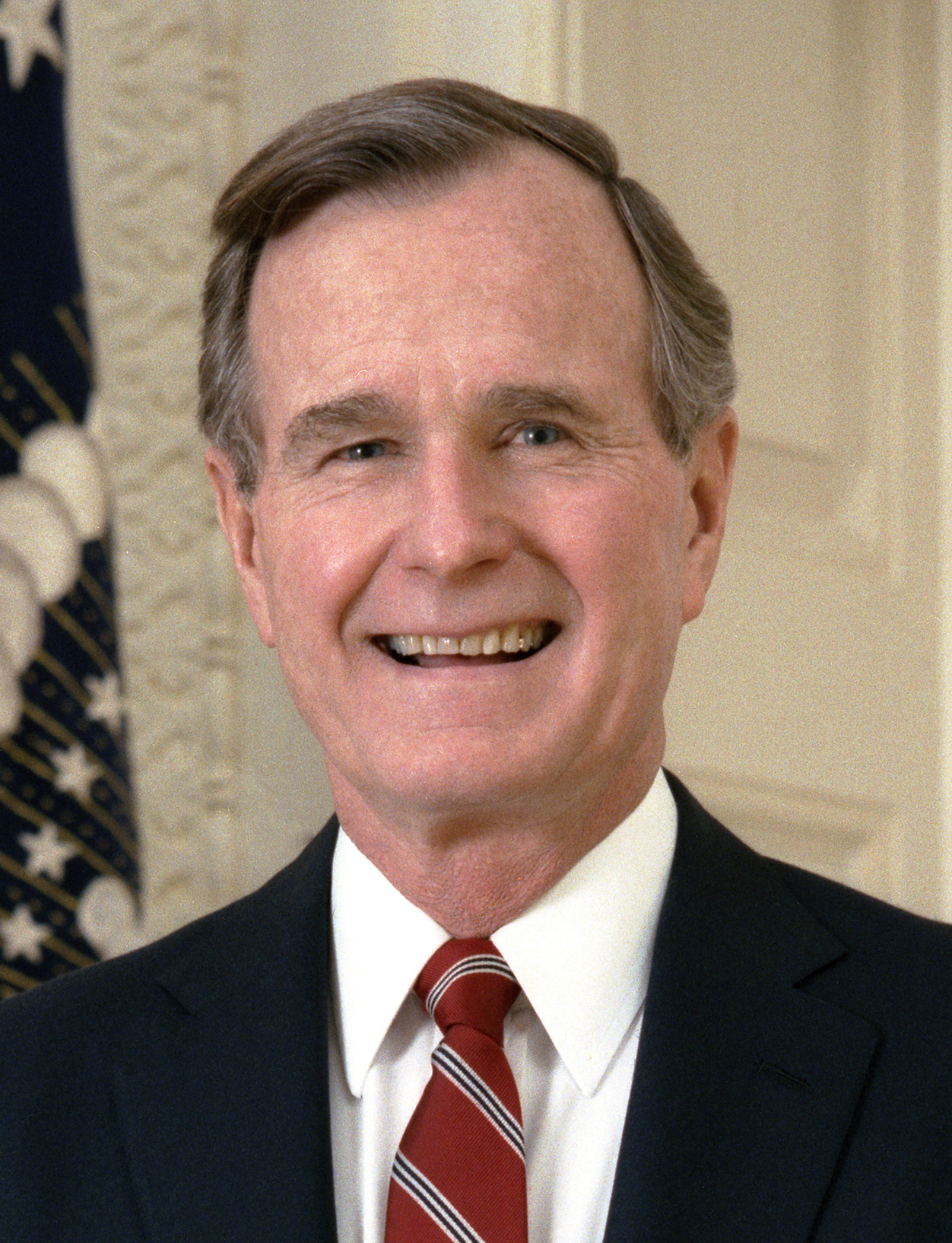
Nominee	Bill Clinton	George H. W. Bush
Party	Democratic	Republican
Home state	Arkansas	Texas
Running mate	Al Gore	Dan Quayle
Electoral vote	3	0
Popular vote	192,619	20,698
Percentage	84.64%	9.10%
Ward results
Clinton
70–80%
80–90%
90–100%
President before election
George H. W. Bush
Republican
Elected President
Bill Clinton
Democratic

The 1992 United States presidential election in the District of Columbia took place on November 3, 1992, as part of the 1992 United States presidential election. Voters chose three representatives, or electors to the Electoral College, who voted for president and vice president.

The District of Columbia, heavily Democratic, was won in a landslide by Governor Bill Clinton (D-Arkansas) with 84.64% of the popular vote over incumbent President George H. W. Bush (R-Texas) with 9.10%. Businessman Ross Perot (I-Texas) finished in third, with 4.25% of the popular vote. Clinton ultimately won the national vote, defeating incumbent President Bush and Perot.

The District of Columbia was one of only four contests where if Bush's and Perot's vote had been combined, Clinton would still come out on top, along with New York, Arkansas, and Maryland.

Arkansas and DC are also the only contests where anybody received an absolute majority (>50%) of the vote.

This was the first election where the Republican nominee received a single-digit vote share in the district, which has been repeated in every election since.

== Results ==
1992 United States presidential election in the District of Columbia
Party	Candidate	Votes	Percentage	Electoral votes
Democratic	Bill Clinton	192,619	84.64%	3
Republican	George H. W. Bush (incumbent)	20,698	9.10%	0
Independent	Ross Perot	9,681	4.25%	0
New Alliance	Lenora Fulani	1,459	0.64%	0
Independent	Ronald Daniels	1,446	0.64%	0
Libertarian	Andre Marrou	467	0.21%	0
N/A	Write-ins	1,202	0.53%	0
Totals		227,572	100.00%	3

== See also ==
- United States presidential elections in the District of Columbia
