= 1992 United States presidential election in Iowa =

- November 3, 1992

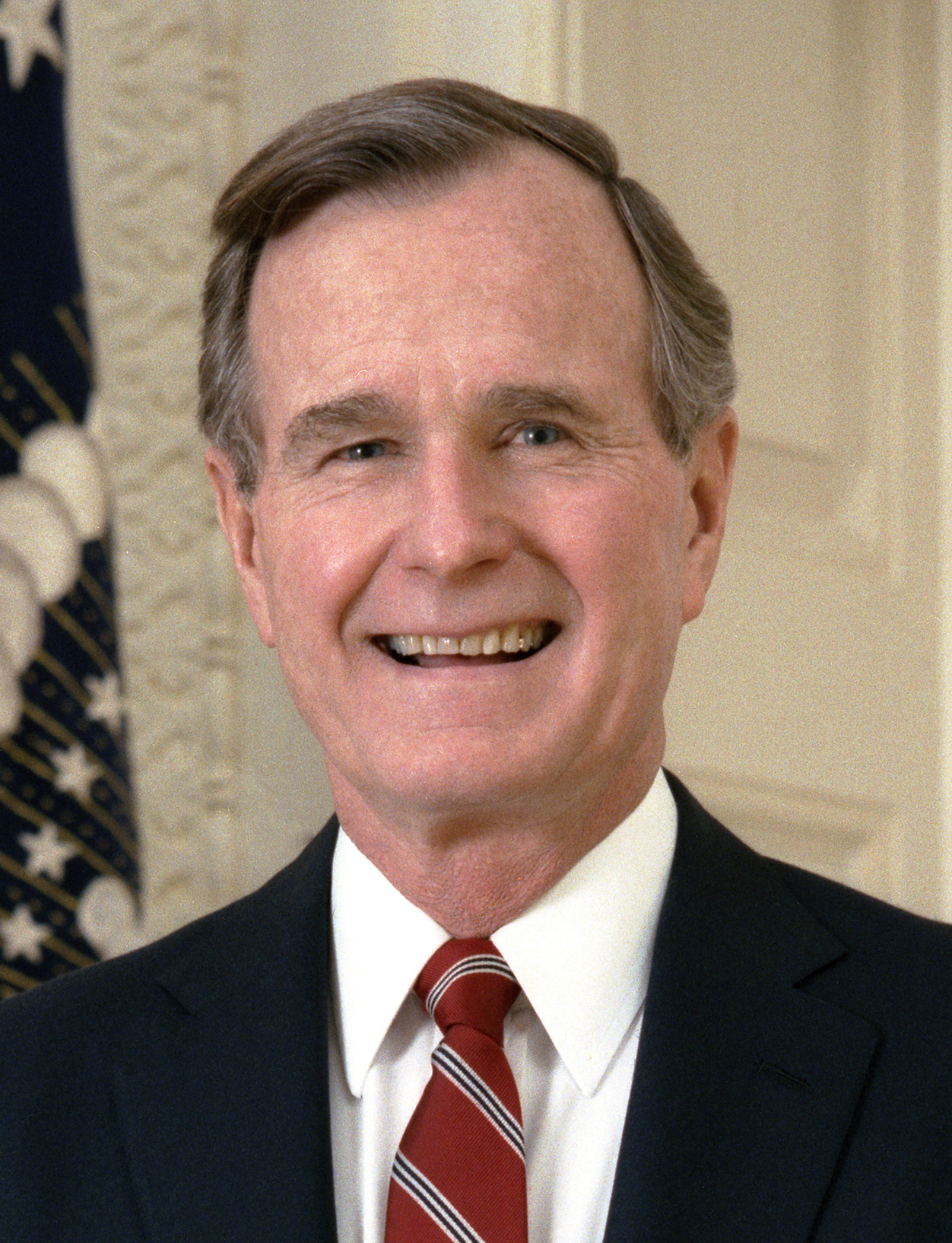

| Nominee | Bill Clinton | George H. W. Bush | Ross Perot |
| Party | Democratic | Republican | Independent |
| Home state | Arkansas | Texas | Texas |
| Running mate | Al Gore | Dan Quayle | James Stockdale |
| Electoral vote | 7 | 0 | 0 |
| Popular vote | 586,353 | 504,891 | 253,468 |
| Percentage | 43.29% | 37.27% | 18.71% |
County results
Clinton
30–40%
40–50%
50–60%
Bush
30–40%
40–50%
50–60%
70–80%
President before election
George H. W. Bush
Republican
Elected President
Bill Clinton
Democratic

The 1992 United States presidential election in Iowa took place on November 3, 1992, as part of the 1992 United States presidential election. Voters chose seven representatives, or electors to the Electoral College, who voted for president and vice president.

Iowa was won by Democratic governor Bill Clinton of Arkansas with 43.29% of the popular vote over incumbent Republican President George H. W. Bush's 37.27%, a victory margin of 6.01%. Independent businessman Ross Perot finished in third, with 18.71% of the popular vote. Clinton ultimately won the national vote, defeating incumbent president Bush and Perot. With a margin of victory of 6.02% for Clinton, the state voted 0.46% to the left of the nation at-large and became the closest to the national results. Despite this, Iowa was the only state that swung more Republican than it had been in 1988, swinging rightward by 4.2%.

This was the first of six consecutive elections that Iowa did back the winner of the national popular vote, gave it the longest streak of any state nationwide.

== Democratic caucuses ==
1992 Iowa Democratic presidential caucuses
- February 10, 1992

Democratic National Convention delegates The number of pledged delegates won is determined by the number of state delegate equivalents (SDEs) won (Note: The number of pledged national convention delegates is calculated through the number of SDEs won, however, a candidate must get both at least 15% of the total vote to get statewide delegates and at least 15% of the vote in a congressional district to get district delegates from that district. Each precinct has a certain number of SDEs and allocates them based on how many caucus goers there are for each candidate at that precinct.)
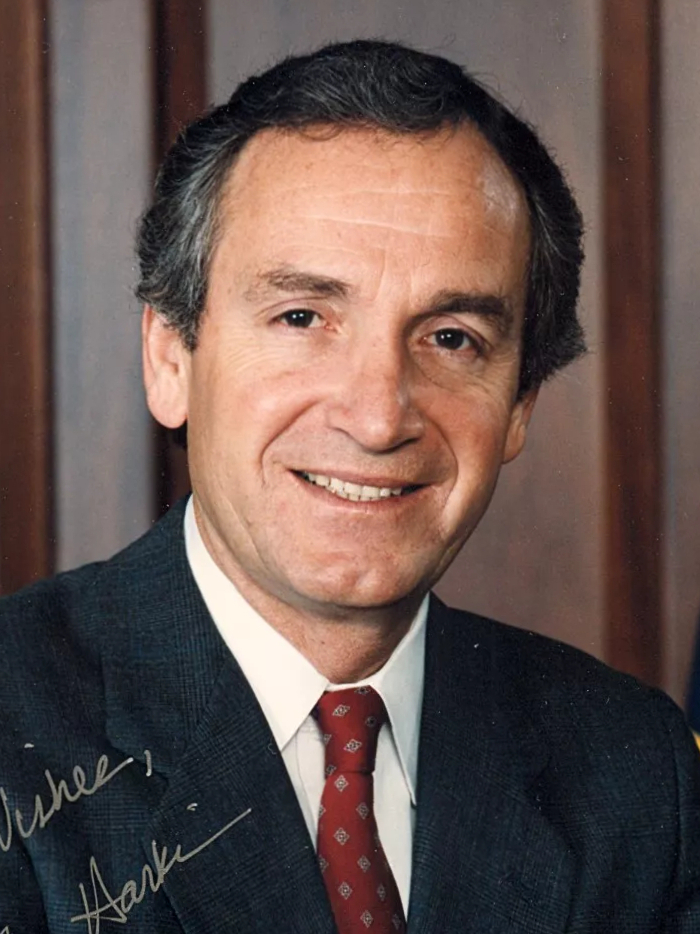

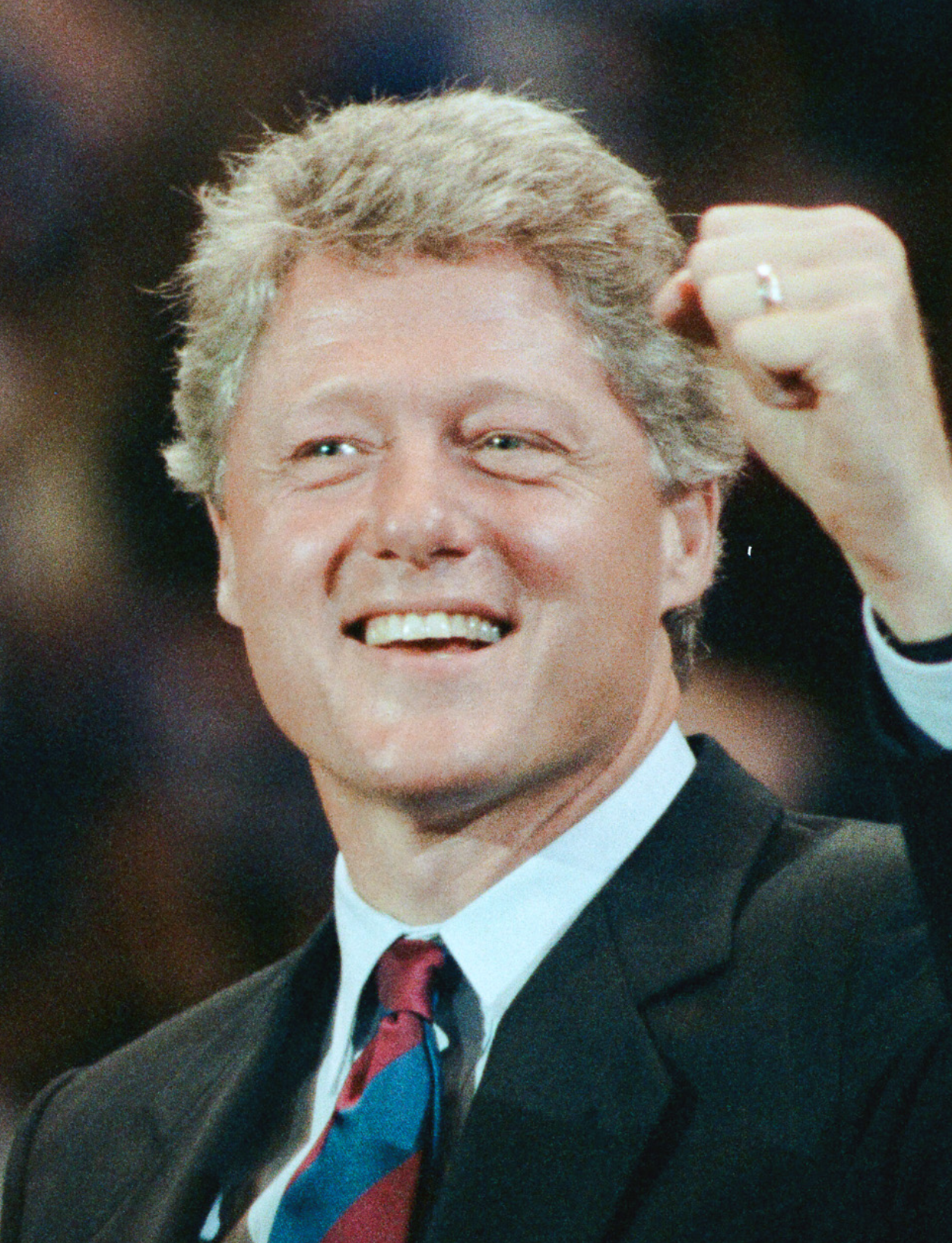

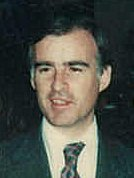
| Candidate | Tom Harkin | Uncommitted |
| Home state | Iowa | N/A |
| Delegate count | 26 | 15 |
| SDEs | 2,314 | 355 |
| Percentage (of SDEs) | 77.24% | 11.85% |
| Candidate | Bill Clinton | Jerry Brown |
| Home state | Arkansas | California |
| Delegate count | 7 | 1 |
| SDEs | 76 | 51 |
| Percentage (of SDEs) | 2.54% | 1.70% |

In the presidential caucuses most candidates for the Democratic nomination did not campaign in Iowa because of the presence of Tom Harkin, a longtime U.S. senator representing Iowa.

Harkin was running for president in 1992 as a populist with labor union support who criticized George H. W. Bush for being out of touch with working class Americans. Harkin was an early favorite in a small field of five candidates. Harkin easily won the caucus with 76% of the vote, uncommitted got second place with 11%, Senator Paul Tsongas came in third, with 4%, and Governor Bill Clinton finished fourth, with 2%.

Voter turnout in the caucuses fell from over 120,000 in the 1988 caucus to less than 40,000. Voter turnout would later increase to around 120,000 for the 2000 caucuses. As the race was not contested, these results had little effect on the remaining primaries, and the New Hampshire primary took on added importance.

Iowa Democratic Presidential Caucus Results – 1992
| Party | Candidate | State delegate equivalents | Percentage | Delegates |
|---|---|---|---|---|
| Democratic | Tom Harkin | 2,314 | 77.24% | 26 |
| Democratic | Uncommitted | 355 | 11.85% | 15 |
| Democratic | Paul Tsongas | 128 | 4.27% | 0 |
| Democratic | Bill Clinton | 76 | 2.54% | 7 |
| Democratic | Robert Kerrey | 72 | 2.40% | 0 |
| Democratic | Jerry Brown | 51 | 1.70% | 1 |

Tom Harkin won every county by large margins. The delegate totals reflect their final distribution, not their projected allocation immediately following the caucus.

== Results ==
1992 United States presidential election in Iowa
| Party | Candidate | Votes | Percentage | Electoral votes |
|---|---|---|---|---|
| Democratic | Bill Clinton | 586,353 | 43.29% | 7 |
| Republican | George H. W. Bush (incumbent) | 504,891 | 37.27% | 0 |
| Independent | Ross Perot | 253,468 | 18.71% | 0 |
| Natural Law | Dr. John Hagelin | 3,079 | 0.23% | 0 |
| Write-ins | | 2,102 | 0.13% | 0 |
| America First | James "Bo" Gritz | 1,177 | 0.09% | 0 |
| Libertarian | Andre Marrou | 1,076 | 0.08% | 0 |
| Grassroots | Jack Herer | 669 | 0.05% | 0 |
| Independent | John Yiamouyiannis | 604 | 0.04% | 0 |
| Taxpayers’ | Howard Phillips | 480 | 0.04% | 0 |
| Socialist Workers Party | James Warren | 273 | 0.02% | 0 |
| Democrats for Economic Recovery | Lyndon LaRouche | 238 | 0.02% | 0 |
| New Alliance Party | Lenora Fulani | 197 | 0.01% | 0 |
| Totals | | 1,354,607 | 100.0% | 7 |
| Voter Turnout (Voting age/Registered) | | | | 65%/80% |

=== Results by county ===
| County | Bill Clinton Democratic | | George H.W. Bush Republican | | Ross Perot Independent | | John Hagelin Natural Law | | Various candidates Other parties | | Margin | | Total votes cast |
| County | # | % | # | % | # | % | # | % | # | % | # | % | Total votes cast |
|---|---|---|---|---|---|---|---|---|---|---|---|---|---|
| Adair | 1,655 | 39.46% | 1,713 | 40.84% | 814 | 19.41% | 1 | 0.02% | 11 | 0.26% | -58 | -1.38% | 4,194 |
| Adams | 1,034 | 39.83% | 863 | 33.24% | 679 | 26.16% | 2 | 0.08% | 18 | 0.69% | 171 | 6.59% | 2,596 |
| Allamakee | 2,362 | 35.36% | 2,627 | 39.33% | 1,543 | 23.10% | 4 | 0.06% | 143 | 2.14% | -265 | -3.97% | 6,679 |
| Appanoose | 2,810 | 44.09% | 2,346 | 36.81% | 1,161 | 18.22% | 6 | 0.09% | 50 | 0.78% | 464 | 7.28% | 6,373 |
| Audubon | 1,589 | 41.03% | 1,373 | 35.45% | 887 | 22.90% | 7 | 0.18% | 17 | 0.44% | 216 | 5.58% | 3,873 |
| Benton | 4,467 | 42.79% | 3,469 | 33.23% | 2,454 | 23.51% | 8 | 0.08% | 41 | 0.39% | 998 | 9.56% | 10,439 |
| Black Hawk | 29,584 | 48.06% | 21,398 | 34.77% | 10,182 | 16.54% | 64 | 0.10% | 322 | 0.52% | 8,186 | 13.29% | 61,550 |
| Boone | 5,913 | 48.39% | 4,148 | 33.95% | 2,070 | 16.94% | 12 | 0.10% | 76 | 0.62% | 1,765 | 14.44% | 12,219 |
| Bremer | 4,774 | 40.75% | 4,482 | 38.26% | 2,338 | 19.96% | 7 | 0.06% | 113 | 0.96% | 292 | 2.49% | 11,714 |
| Buchanan | 4,166 | 43.15% | 3,313 | 34.32% | 2,126 | 22.02% | 6 | 0.06% | 43 | 0.45% | 853 | 8.83% | 9,654 |
| Buena Vista | 3,374 | 36.45% | 3,863 | 41.73% | 1,955 | 21.12% | 13 | 0.14% | 52 | 0.56% | -489 | -5.28% | 9,257 |
| Butler | 2,548 | 35.70% | 3,209 | 44.96% | 1,333 | 18.68% | 10 | 0.14% | 37 | 0.52% | -661 | -9.26% | 7,137 |
| Calhoun | 2,140 | 40.58% | 2,169 | 41.13% | 946 | 17.94% | 5 | 0.09% | 14 | 0.27% | -29 | -0.55% | 5,274 |
| Carroll | 3,800 | 40.11% | 3,439 | 36.30% | 2,192 | 23.13% | 3 | 0.03% | 41 | 0.43% | 361 | 3.81% | 9,475 |
| Cass | 2,231 | 31.61% | 3,176 | 45.00% | 1,608 | 22.78% | 3 | 0.04% | 40 | 0.57% | -945 | -13.39% | 7,058 |
| Cedar | 3,296 | 40.00% | 2,965 | 35.98% | 1,945 | 23.60% | 10 | 0.12% | 24 | 0.29% | 331 | 4.02% | 8,240 |
| Cerro Gordo | 11,415 | 46.99% | 8,250 | 33.96% | 4,498 | 18.52% | 24 | 0.10% | 106 | 0.44% | 3,165 | 13.03% | 24,293 |
| Cherokee | 2,590 | 37.57% | 2,768 | 40.16% | 1,503 | 21.80% | 5 | 0.07% | 27 | 0.39% | -178 | -2.59% | 6,893 |
| Chickasaw | 2,913 | 43.87% | 2,129 | 32.06% | 1,566 | 23.58% | 2 | 0.03% | 30 | 0.45% | 784 | 11.81% | 6,640 |
| Clarke | 1,921 | 45.09% | 1,417 | 33.26% | 899 | 21.10% | 9 | 0.21% | 14 | 0.33% | 504 | 11.83% | 4,260 |
| Clay | 3,346 | 39.93% | 3,011 | 35.93% | 1,964 | 23.44% | 6 | 0.07% | 53 | 0.63% | 335 | 4.00% | 8,380 |
| Clayton | 3,742 | 40.72% | 3,044 | 33.12% | 2,309 | 25.13% | 13 | 0.14% | 82 | 0.89% | 698 | 7.60% | 9,190 |
| Clinton | 11,683 | 46.81% | 8,746 | 35.04% | 4,414 | 17.68% | 13 | 0.05% | 104 | 0.42% | 2,937 | 11.77% | 24,960 |
| Crawford | 3,004 | 39.16% | 2,693 | 35.10% | 1,905 | 24.83% | 5 | 0.07% | 65 | 0.85% | 311 | 4.06% | 7,672 |
| Dallas | 6,554 | 44.10% | 5,587 | 37.60% | 2,665 | 17.93% | 10 | 0.07% | 45 | 0.30% | 967 | 6.50% | 14,861 |
| Davis | 1,962 | 48.55% | 1,344 | 33.26% | 718 | 17.77% | 3 | 0.07% | 14 | 0.35% | 618 | 15.29% | 4,041 |
| Decatur | 1,866 | 46.81% | 1,316 | 33.02% | 786 | 19.72% | 1 | 0.03% | 17 | 0.43% | 550 | 13.79% | 3,986 |
| Delaware | 3,093 | 36.42% | 3,195 | 37.62% | 2,144 | 25.25% | 12 | 0.14% | 48 | 0.57% | -102 | -1.20% | 8,492 |
| Des Moines | 11,309 | 53.37% | 6,378 | 30.10% | 3,386 | 15.98% | 17 | 0.08% | 100 | 0.47% | 4,931 | 23.27% | 21,190 |
| Dickinson | 3,106 | 37.40% | 3,196 | 38.48% | 1,974 | 23.77% | 3 | 0.04% | 26 | 0.31% | -90 | -1.08% | 8,305 |
| Dubuque | 20,539 | 47.80% | 14,007 | 32.60% | 8,208 | 19.10% | 46 | 0.11% | 168 | 0.39% | 6,532 | 15.20% | 42,968 |
| Emmet | 2,239 | 44.50% | 1,749 | 34.76% | 1,010 | 20.07% | 9 | 0.18% | 25 | 0.50% | 490 | 9.74% | 5,032 |
| Fayette | 4,412 | 40.62% | 3,879 | 35.71% | 2,493 | 22.95% | 10 | 0.09% | 67 | 0.62% | 533 | 4.91% | 10,861 |
| Floyd | 3,688 | 47.59% | 2,404 | 31.02% | 1,611 | 20.79% | 6 | 0.08% | 41 | 0.53% | 1,284 | 16.57% | 7,750 |
| Franklin | 2,049 | 38.91% | 2,137 | 40.58% | 1,045 | 19.84% | 2 | 0.04% | 33 | 0.63% | -88 | -1.67% | 5,266 |
| Fremont | 1,422 | 36.36% | 1,459 | 37.31% | 1,003 | 25.65% | 7 | 0.18% | 20 | 0.51% | -37 | -0.95% | 3,911 |
| Greene | 2,422 | 45.25% | 1,952 | 36.47% | 956 | 17.86% | 1 | 0.02% | 22 | 0.41% | 470 | 8.78% | 5,353 |
| Grundy | 1,895 | 30.78% | 3,160 | 51.33% | 1,069 | 17.37% | 3 | 0.05% | 29 | 0.47% | -1,265 | -20.55% | 6,156 |
| Guthrie | 2,234 | 40.97% | 1,962 | 35.98% | 1,216 | 22.30% | 5 | 0.09% | 36 | 0.66% | 272 | 4.99% | 5,453 |
| Hamilton | 3,262 | 42.47% | 3,031 | 39.46% | 1,348 | 17.55% | 11 | 0.14% | 29 | 0.38% | 231 | 3.01% | 7,681 |
| Hancock | 2,175 | 37.46% | 2,428 | 41.82% | 1,170 | 20.15% | 6 | 0.10% | 27 | 0.47% | -253 | -4.36% | 5,806 |
| Hardin | 3,792 | 42.23% | 3,590 | 39.98% | 1,547 | 17.23% | 7 | 0.08% | 43 | 0.48% | 202 | 2.25% | 8,979 |
| Harrison | 2,349 | 34.20% | 2,763 | 40.23% | 1,691 | 24.62% | 6 | 0.09% | 59 | 0.86% | -414 | -6.03% | 6,868 |
| Henry | 3,544 | 41.08% | 3,435 | 39.81% | 1,522 | 17.64% | 34 | 0.39% | 93 | 1.08% | 109 | 1.27% | 8,628 |
| Howard | 2,099 | 43.17% | 1,516 | 31.18% | 1,193 | 24.54% | 3 | 0.06% | 51 | 1.05% | 583 | 11.99% | 4,862 |
| Humboldt | 1,765 | 34.04% | 2,299 | 44.34% | 1,093 | 21.08% | 3 | 0.06% | 25 | 0.48% | -534 | -10.30% | 5,185 |
| Ida | 1,449 | 34.18% | 1,714 | 40.43% | 1,061 | 25.03% | 1 | 0.02% | 14 | 0.33% | -265 | -6.25% | 4,239 |
| Iowa | 2,560 | 36.76% | 2,656 | 38.13% | 1,709 | 24.54% | 6 | 0.09% | 34 | 0.49% | -96 | -1.37% | 6,965 |
| Jackson | 4,421 | 47.52% | 2,673 | 28.73% | 2,096 | 22.53% | 10 | 0.11% | 103 | 1.11% | 1,748 | 18.79% | 9,303 |
| Jasper | 8,120 | 45.08% | 6,866 | 38.12% | 2,972 | 16.50% | 12 | 0.07% | 42 | 0.23% | 1,254 | 6.96% | 18,012 |
| Jefferson | 2,562 | 30.72% | 2,541 | 30.46% | 1,241 | 14.88% | 1,899 | 22.77% | 98 | 1.17% | 21 | 0.26% | 8,341 |
| Johnson | 28,656 | 55.35% | 14,041 | 27.12% | 8,625 | 16.66% | 69 | 0.13% | 383 | 0.74% | 14,615 | 28.23% | 51,774 |
| Jones | 3,508 | 39.42% | 3,071 | 34.51% | 2,306 | 25.91% | 3 | 0.03% | 12 | 0.13% | 437 | 4.91% | 8,900 |
| Keokuk | 2,329 | 41.76% | 1,981 | 35.52% | 1,238 | 22.20% | 11 | 0.20% | 18 | 0.32% | 348 | 6.24% | 5,577 |
| Kossuth | 3,660 | 40.40% | 3,464 | 38.24% | 1,906 | 21.04% | 6 | 0.07% | 23 | 0.25% | 196 | 2.16% | 9,059 |
| Lee | 9,366 | 54.61% | 4,777 | 27.85% | 2,920 | 17.02% | 11 | 0.06% | 78 | 0.45% | 4,589 | 26.76% | 17,152 |
| Linn | 38,567 | 43.39% | 30,215 | 33.99% | 19,643 | 22.10% | 101 | 0.11% | 359 | 0.40% | 8,352 | 9.40% | 88,885 |
| Louisa | 2,091 | 43.17% | 1,691 | 34.91% | 1,044 | 21.55% | 2 | 0.04% | 16 | 0.33% | 400 | 8.26% | 4,844 |
| Lucas | 2,072 | 44.33% | 1,734 | 37.10% | 848 | 18.14% | 4 | 0.09% | 16 | 0.34% | 338 | 7.23% | 4,674 |
| Lyon | 1,331 | 23.24% | 3,272 | 57.14% | 1,068 | 18.65% | 2 | 0.03% | 53 | 0.93% | -1,941 | -33.90% | 5,726 |
| Madison | 2,525 | 41.06% | 2,421 | 39.37% | 1,168 | 18.99% | 6 | 0.10% | 29 | 0.47% | 104 | 1.69% | 6,149 |
| Mahaska | 3,714 | 36.24% | 4,953 | 48.34% | 1,508 | 14.72% | 8 | 0.08% | 64 | 0.62% | -1,239 | -12.10% | 10,247 |
| Marion | 5,531 | 40.87% | 6,062 | 44.79% | 1,896 | 14.01% | 6 | 0.04% | 38 | 0.28% | -531 | -3.92% | 13,533 |
| Marshall | 8,303 | 45.40% | 6,784 | 37.09% | 3,100 | 16.95% | 17 | 0.09% | 85 | 0.46% | 1,519 | 8.31% | 18,289 |
| Mills | 1,798 | 29.16% | 2,699 | 43.77% | 1,638 | 26.57% | 3 | 0.05% | 28 | 0.45% | -901 | -14.61% | 6,166 |
| Mitchell | 2,177 | 40.71% | 1,933 | 36.15% | 1,199 | 22.42% | 4 | 0.07% | 34 | 0.64% | 244 | 4.56% | 5,347 |
| Monona | 1,939 | 39.99% | 1,660 | 34.23% | 1,231 | 25.39% | 1 | 0.02% | 18 | 0.37% | 279 | 5.76% | 4,849 |
| Monroe | 1,829 | 48.36% | 1,323 | 34.98% | 612 | 16.18% | 4 | 0.11% | 14 | 0.37% | 506 | 13.38% | 3,782 |
| Montgomery | 1,599 | 29.78% | 2,404 | 44.78% | 1,341 | 24.98% | 7 | 0.13% | 18 | 0.34% | -805 | -15.00% | 5,369 |
| Muscatine | 7,089 | 42.04% | 6,087 | 36.09% | 3,583 | 21.25% | 15 | 0.09% | 90 | 0.53% | 1,002 | 5.95% | 16,864 |
| O'Brien | 2,122 | 28.00% | 3,869 | 51.06% | 1,557 | 20.55% | 4 | 0.05% | 26 | 0.34% | -1,747 | -23.06% | 7,578 |
| Osceola | 990 | 27.50% | 1,756 | 48.78% | 813 | 22.58% | 2 | 0.06% | 39 | 1.08% | -766 | -21.28% | 3,600 |
| Page | 1,951 | 26.69% | 3,670 | 50.21% | 1,669 | 22.83% | 7 | 0.10% | 13 | 0.18% | -1,719 | -23.52% | 7,310 |
| Palo Alto | 2,374 | 44.13% | 1,789 | 33.26% | 1,186 | 22.05% | 4 | 0.07% | 26 | 0.48% | 585 | 10.87% | 5,379 |
| Plymouth | 3,171 | 30.25% | 5,196 | 49.56% | 2,039 | 19.45% | 8 | 0.08% | 70 | 0.67% | -2,025 | -19.31% | 10,484 |
| Pocahontas | 1,919 | 41.10% | 1,743 | 37.33% | 942 | 20.18% | 13 | 0.28% | 52 | 1.11% | 176 | 3.77% | 4,669 |
| Polk | 78,585 | 46.98% | 63,708 | 38.09% | 24,155 | 14.44% | 94 | 0.06% | 716 | 0.43% | 14,877 | 8.89% | 167,258 |
| Pottawattamie | 13,228 | 35.64% | 15,671 | 42.22% | 8,035 | 21.65% | 44 | 0.12% | 137 | 0.37% | -2,443 | -6.58% | 37,115 |
| Poweshiek | 4,056 | 44.83% | 3,245 | 35.87% | 1,680 | 18.57% | 10 | 0.11% | 56 | 0.62% | 811 | 8.96% | 9,047 |
| Ringgold | 1,341 | 46.74% | 967 | 33.71% | 551 | 19.21% | 3 | 0.10% | 7 | 0.24% | 374 | 13.03% | 2,869 |
| Sac | 1,896 | 36.36% | 2,138 | 41.00% | 1,157 | 22.19% | 5 | 0.10% | 19 | 0.36% | -242 | -4.64% | 5,215 |
| Scott | 33,765 | 45.22% | 28,844 | 38.63% | 11,423 | 15.30% | 80 | 0.11% | 550 | 0.74% | 4,921 | 6.59% | 74,662 |
| Shelby | 2,094 | 32.00% | 2,809 | 42.92% | 1,614 | 24.66% | 1 | 0.02% | 26 | 0.40% | -715 | -10.92% | 6,544 |
| Sioux | 2,226 | 15.11% | 10,637 | 72.21% | 1,771 | 12.02% | 5 | 0.03% | 91 | 0.62% | -8,411 | -57.10% | 14,730 |
| Story | 17,118 | 47.14% | 12,702 | 34.98% | 6,275 | 17.28% | 24 | 0.07% | 192 | 0.53% | 4,416 | 12.16% | 36,311 |
| Tama | 3,573 | 42.89% | 2,948 | 35.39% | 1,748 | 20.98% | 18 | 0.22% | 43 | 0.52% | 625 | 7.50% | 8,330 |
| Taylor | 1,430 | 40.27% | 1,200 | 33.79% | 910 | 25.63% | 2 | 0.06% | 9 | 0.25% | 230 | 6.48% | 3,551 |
| Union | 2,565 | 42.04% | 2,224 | 36.45% | 1,280 | 20.98% | 7 | 0.11% | 26 | 0.43% | 341 | 5.59% | 6,102 |
| Van Buren | 1,464 | 39.46% | 1,418 | 38.22% | 811 | 21.86% | 6 | 0.16% | 11 | 0.30% | 46 | 1.24% | 3,710 |
| Wapello | 8,670 | 53.91% | 4,852 | 30.17% | 2,513 | 15.63% | 12 | 0.07% | 36 | 0.22% | 3,818 | 23.74% | 16,083 |
| Warren | 8,612 | 44.95% | 7,242 | 37.80% | 3,217 | 16.79% | 12 | 0.06% | 74 | 0.39% | 1,370 | 7.15% | 19,157 |
| Washington | 3,384 | 37.52% | 3,576 | 39.65% | 1,994 | 22.11% | 15 | 0.17% | 49 | 0.54% | -192 | -2.13% | 9,018 |
| Wayne | 1,632 | 45.54% | 1,299 | 36.24% | 642 | 17.91% | 2 | 0.06% | 9 | 0.25% | 333 | 9.30% | 3,584 |
| Webster | 8,562 | 45.25% | 6,992 | 36.95% | 3,272 | 17.29% | 18 | 0.10% | 77 | 0.41% | 1,570 | 8.30% | 18,921 |
| Winnebago | 2,322 | 38.20% | 2,407 | 39.60% | 1,329 | 21.87% | 2 | 0.03% | 18 | 0.30% | -85 | -1.40% | 6,078 |
| Winneshiek | 3,791 | 39.39% | 3,331 | 34.61% | 2,416 | 25.10% | 5 | 0.05% | 81 | 0.84% | 460 | 4.78% | 9,624 |
| Woodbury | 17,398 | 40.59% | 18,148 | 42.34% | 7,182 | 16.76% | 19 | 0.04% | 117 | 0.27% | -750 | -1.75% | 42,864 |
| Worth | 2,009 | 45.17% | 1,382 | 31.07% | 1,044 | 23.47% | 3 | 0.07% | 10 | 0.22% | 627 | 14.10% | 4,448 |
| Wright | 2,776 | 41.65% | 2,708 | 40.63% | 1,151 | 17.27% | 6 | 0.09% | 24 | 0.36% | 68 | 1.02% | 6,665 |
| Totals | 586,353 | 43.29% | 504,891 | 37.27% | 253,468 | 18.71% | 3,079 | 0.23% | 6,816 | 0.50% | 81,462 | 6.02% | 1,354,607 |

==== Counties that flipped from Democratic to Republican ====
- Adair
- Buena Vista
- Calhoun
- Cherokee
- Delaware
- Franklin
- Hancock
- Humboldt
- Iowa
- Marion
- Sac
- Washington
- Woodbury

==== Counties that flipped from Republican to Democratic ====
- Bremer
- Henry
- Jefferson
- Van Buren

=== By congressional district ===
Clinton won four of five congressional districts, including three that elected Republicans.

| District | Bush | Clinton | Representative |
|---|---|---|---|
| 1st | 34% | 46% | Jim Leach |
| 2nd | 35% | 44% | Jim Nussle |
| 3rd | 36% | 45% | Jim Ross Lightfoot |
| 4th | 39% | 43% | Neal Smith |
| 5th | 42% | 38% | Fred Grandy |

== See also ==
- United States presidential elections in Iowa
