= Jerry Brown 1992 presidential campaign =

American political campaign

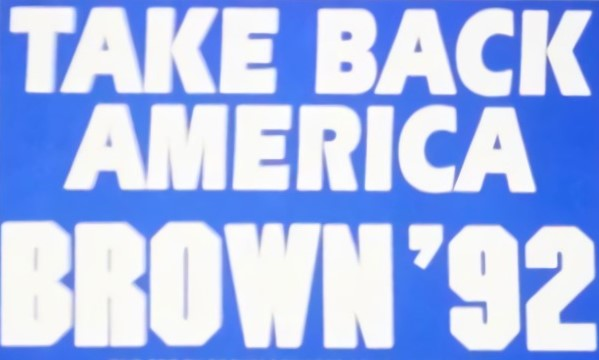
- Candidate: Jerry Brown; 34th and 39th Governor of California (1975–1983) (2011–2019)
- Status: Unsuccessful in winning the Democratic nomination
- Announced: October 16, 1991
- Suspended: July 1992

Jerry Brown, the Democratic governor of California from 1975 to 1983 and 2011 to 2019, ran a campaign to be elected President of the United States in the 1992 presidential election.

Brown had previously run for president, unsuccessfully, in 1976 and 1980, losing both Democratic nominations to Jimmy Carter. He announced his 1992 campaign on October 16, 1991, and eventually competed against five other candidates. He ran a campaign focused heavily on corruption in politics. He was hurt by allegations that he had changed too much of his positions from what he believed previously. In March 1992, the Democratic primaries narrowed to Brown and Bill Clinton; the latter ended up winning the nomination and the presidency. Brown ended the campaign in July 1992, after winning six primaries and more than 500 delegates.

== Background ==
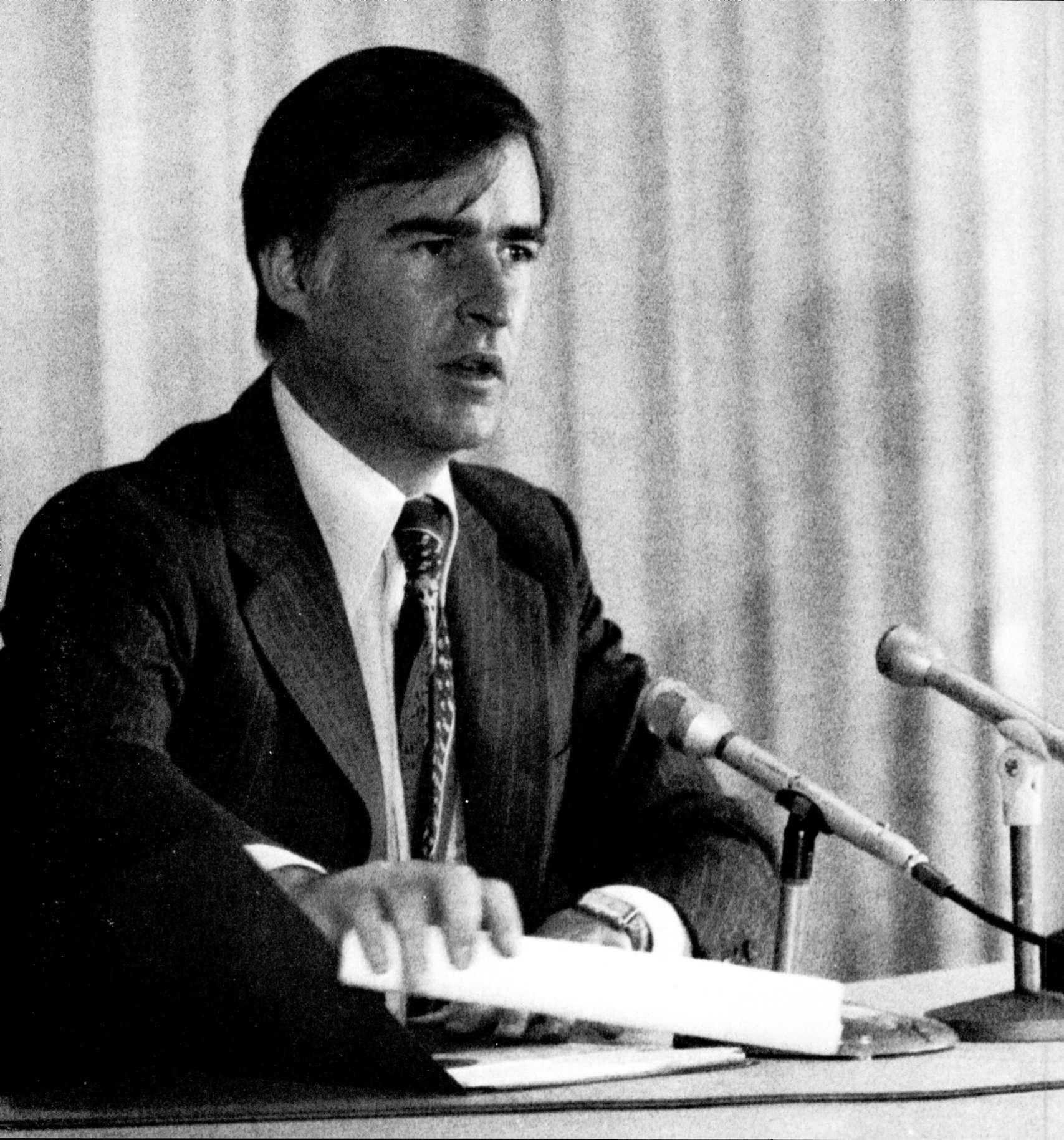
Brown in 1981

Jerry Brown was the Democratic governor of California from 1975 to 1983. He had run for president in 1976 and 1980, losing both Democratic nominations to Jimmy Carter. In 1982, he ran for Senate, but lost. Afterwards, "he drifted to Mexico to learn Spanish, to Japan to study Buddhism in a monastery, and to India to work with Mother Teresa." Returning to the U.S. in 1987, he went back to California politics, organizing a program to raise money for the party and register new voters, which was successful before he cancelled the program. On February 12, 1989, he was elected chairman of the California Democratic Party. On February 4, 1991, he resigned as party chairman to explore a bid for Senate. On September 4, 1991, he dropped out of the Senate race to run for president.

The Republican Party had held the presidency from 1980 to 1992, and under the incumbent president George H.W. Bush, the economy was stalling; Bush's approval rating started to sink.

== Campaign ==
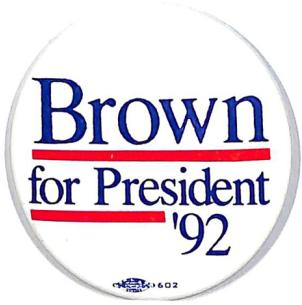
A campaign button

When Brown was in the process of starting his campaign, Jude Wanniski set up a meeting between him and Wall Street financiers, but Brown did not show up to the meeting, ultimately sticking to his negative beliefs about money in politics. Brown announced his candidacy on October 21, 1991. His first speech was plagiarized from a manifesto by speechwriter Richard Goodwin. He ran a campaign generally focused on corruption. He specifically advocated for campaign finance reform, congressional term limits, universal health care, gun control, a flat income tax, environmentalism, cuts to military spending and property taxes, and he opposed nuclear power and free trade with Mexico. His positions on gun control, healthcare, the flat tax, and free trade in 1992 were different from previous years; The New York Times wrote:

Many political figures shift their stands over the years, of course, sometimes out of expediency, sometimes out of a genuine change in circumstances and convictions, sometimes because the responsibilities of governing overtake the promises of campaigning. But even Mr. Brown's supporters acknowledge that his shifts have come more often and been more fundamental than those of most other politicians.

In 1991, there was no front-runner in the Democratic nominations, as Brown competed against Arkansas Governor Bill Clinton, Iowa Senator Tom Harkin, Nebraska Senator Bob Kerrey, former Massachusetts Senator Paul Tsongas, and Virginia Governor Douglas Wilder.

The 53-year-old Mr. Brown, who has showcased his insurgent, anti-establishment campaign at huge college rallies and rock-and-roll fund-raising events, has positioned himself as the youth candidate.

— Alessandra Stanley, The New York Times, April 4, 1992

Brown portrayed himself as an outsider candidate, running an ad showing interviews with his campaign staff who said statements such as: "I think they're all the same, Republicans and Democrats. They're in it for themselves." He did not allow campaign contributions of more than $100, saying that "money is the root of all evil". This was the opposite of his previous position, saying limits on campaign donations are "a violation of free speech". Throughout the campaign and during every debate, he advertised his campaign phone number, 800-426-1112, which played the automated message: "This is Jerry Brown. Thanks for calling. And please do everything you can to assist and be an active member in the insurgent campaign to take back America." The caller could then talk to a real campaigner. Brown went after the youth vote; for example, he appeared on MTV multiple times.

After the first Democratic presidential debate, Brown's support plummeted, and he had very low results in the New Hampshire primary. On March 5, 1992, he won the Colorado primary, stopping him from being seen as a fringe candidate. The race eventually came down to Brown and Clinton, and Brown won Connecticut and Vermont. His campaign was hurt by allegations by the Los Angeles Times that, as governor, he gave important judicial appointments to major campaign contributors.

During the March 16 debate, Brown accused Clinton of "funneling money to [his wife Hillary Clinton's] law firm for state business." This was a misconstruing of a Washington Post article which had run the day prior, about a scandal in which the Clintons "had been business partners with a savings and loan executive whose business was regulated by the state [of Arkansas]." Bill Clinton replied at the debate, "I don't care what you say about me, but you ought to be ashamed of yourself for jumping on my wife. You're not worth being on the same platform as my wife." Hillary Clinton responded to the accusation the next day by saying: "I suppose I could have stayed home and baked cookies and had teas, but what I decided to do is fulfill my profession, which I entered before my husband was in public life." This hurt her standing among stay-at-home moms.

States won by Brown are in yellow, states won by Clinton are in blue

On March 10 (Super Tuesday), Clinton won almost all of the day's primaries. However, Brown's momentum recovered, and he became the front-runner after that point. He was taking the lead in New York and Wisconsin, when he made a significant gaffe; at a speech in New York to a Jewish audience, he said he was considering the Reverend Jesse Jackson as vice president on the general election's ticket. Jackson had previously been widely accused of antisemitism for comments that he had made. On April 7, Brown lost narrowly to Bill Clinton in Wisconsin (37%–34%), and dramatically in New York (41%–26%).

In April 1992, ABC News reported allegations from a California police officer, James C. Pashley, that Brown had held parties during his governorship where cocaine and marijuana were available. Brown denied this.

On June 2, Clinton defeated Brown in California and many other states. Brown's family then started urging him to endorse Clinton, but he held out for a few weeks. In July, he ended his campaign after winning six primaries and more than 500 delegates (a fifth of the total), far below Clinton. However, on July 12, the day prior to the start of the convention, Brown vowed to address the convention with his own political party platform. He would wait to endorse Clinton until the convention got underway on July 13, but would do so quietly. He addressed the 1992 Democratic National Convention, and notably did not mention Clinton.

== Aftermath ==
In 1994, Brown began a radio talk show titled "We the People". In 1998, he won a campaign to be the Mayor of Oakland, and he entered office in 1999. He won a second term in 2002. In 2006, his term ended, and he successfully ran for state attorney general. He was elected Governor of California again in 2010. He won another term in 2015, and served until 2019.

Brown and Clinton had a "sometimes-frayed relationship" for years after the campaign. In 2010, as Brown was running for governor, his Republican opponent Meg Whitman aired TV ads that highlighted Clinton's criticisms of Brown during a 1992 debate. Brown responded by making a joke about the Clinton-Lewinsky scandal during a rally: "Who ever said he (Clinton) told the truth?”. Clinton initially supported Gavin Newsom's unofficial bid for the Governorship in 2010, but after Newsom withdrew to run for Lieutenant Governor, Clinton endorsed and later held large rallies with Brown.
