= 1992 Democratic Party presidential primaries =

Selection of the Democratic Party nominee

- February 10 to June 9, 1992

4,289 delegates (Note: 772 of these delegates were superdelegates, who were uncommitted by default.) to the Democratic National Convention 2,145 (majority) votes needed to win
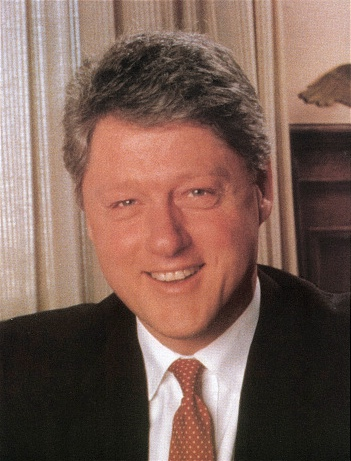

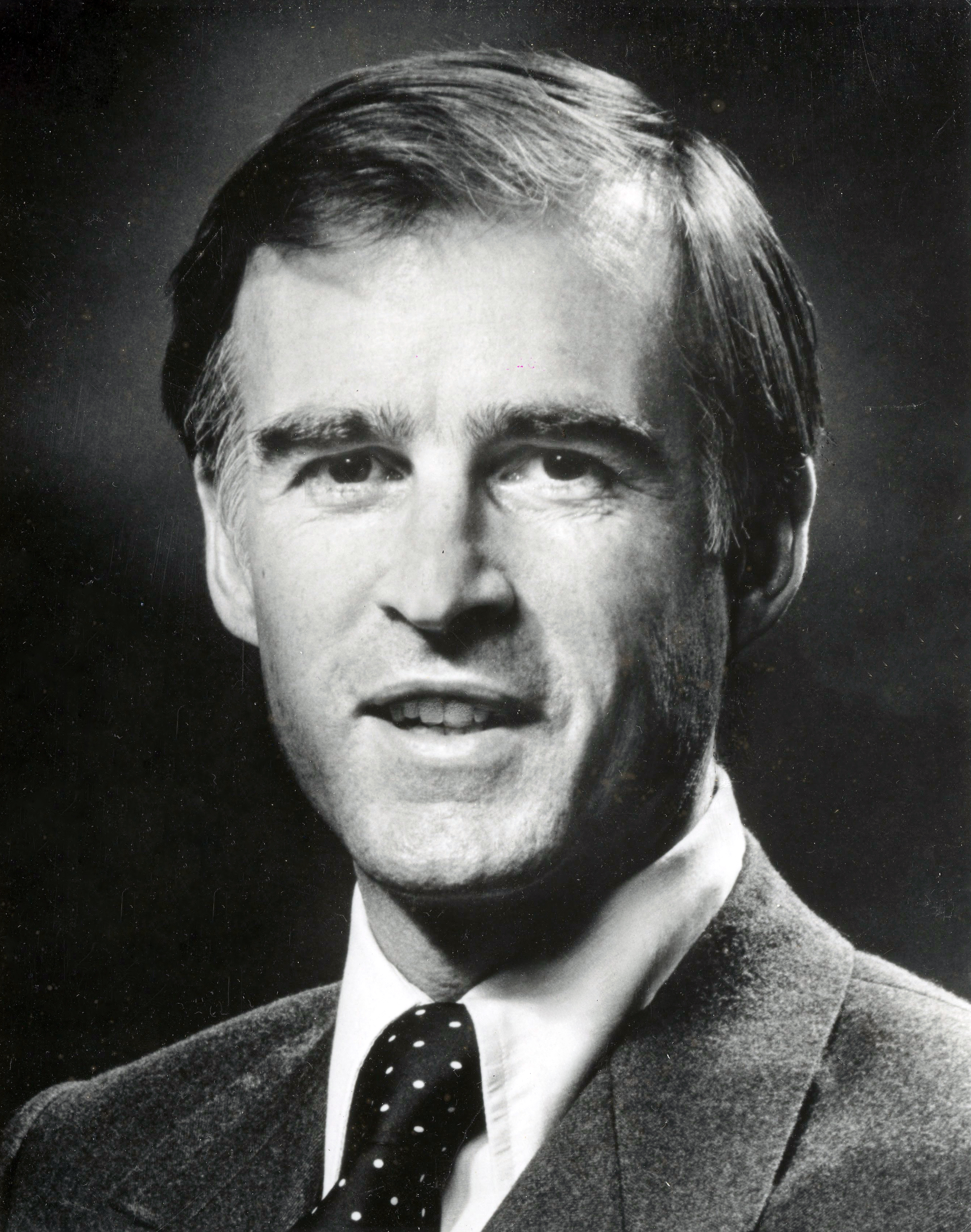

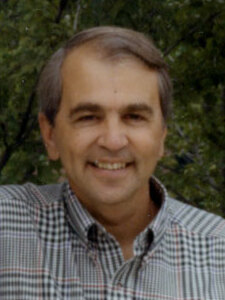

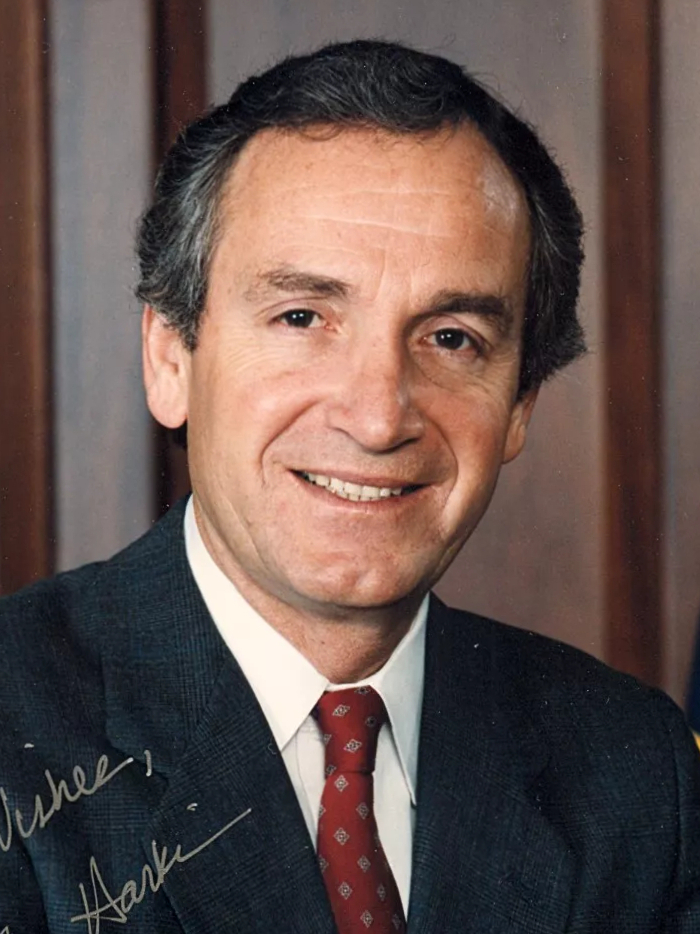

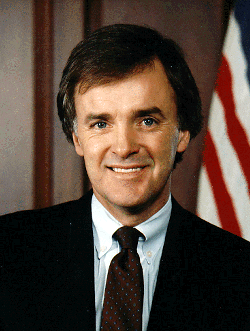
Candidate	Bill Clinton	Jerry Brown	Paul Tsongas
Home state	Arkansas	California	Massachusetts
Delegate count	1,997	588	533
Contests won	37	6	9
Popular vote	10,482,411	4,071,232	3,656,010
Percentage	52.0%	20.2%	18.1%
Candidate	Tom Harkin	Bob Kerrey
Home state	Iowa	Nebraska
Delegate count	38	7
Contests won	3	1
Popular vote	280,304	318,457
Percentage	1.4%	1.6%
- Bill Clinton Jerry Brown; Paul Tsongas Tom Harkin Bob Kerrey
Previous Democratic nominee
Michael Dukakis
Democratic nominee
Bill Clinton

From February 10 to June 9, 1992, voters of the Democratic Party chose its nominee for president in the 1992 United States presidential election. Despite scandals and questions about his character, Arkansas Governor Bill Clinton won the nomination through a series of primary elections and caucuses culminating in the 1992 Democratic National Convention held from July 13 to July 16, 1992, in New York City. Clinton and Tennessee Senator Al Gore were nominated by the convention for president and vice president, respectively.

Clinton and Gore went on to take advantage of the chaos and disarray of the Reagan coalition and win the presidential election, defeating incumbent President George H. W. Bush and becoming the first Democratic nominee since Jimmy Carter to win a presidential election.

== Background ==
Although the McGovern–Fraser Commission had recommended proportionality as early as 1972, this primary was the first to adopt the proportional 15% rule, still in place today, as the standard throughout the country. Any candidate receiving greater than 15% of the vote in a given congressional district (or in the case of New Jersey, state legislative district) would receive a proportional share of the apportioned delegates for that district or state. For 1992 two-thirds of the delegates were selected in 35 primaries.

== Candidates ==
During the aftermath of the Gulf War, President George H. W. Bush's approval ratings were high. At one point after the successful performance by U.S. forces in Kuwait, President Bush had an 89% approval rating.

As a result of Bush's high popularity, major high-profile Democratic candidates feared a high likelihood of defeat in the 1992 general election. This fear was "captured perfectly by Saturday Night Live in a skit called 'Campaign '92: The Race to Avoid Being the Guy Who Loses to Bush,'" in which each prospective major candidate "tried to top the other in explaining why they were unfit to run" for the presidency.

Mario Cuomo and Jesse Jackson declined to seek the Democratic nomination for president, as did U.S. Senator and eventual Vice President Al Gore, whose son had been struck by a car and was undergoing extensive surgery and physical therapy. However, Governors Bill Clinton and Jerry Brown and U.S. Senator Paul Tsongas opted to run for president.

=== Nominee ===
Candidate	Most recent office	Home state	Campaign	Popular vote	Contests won	Running mate
Bill Clinton	Governor of Arkansas (1979–1981) (1983–1992)	Arkansas	(Campaign • Positions); Secured nomination: June 2, 1992	10,482,411 (52.01%)	37; NY, NJ, PA, OH, WV, VA, NC, SC, GA, FL, MI, WI, IL, IN, KY, TN, AL, MS, LA, AR, NE, KS, OK, TX, NM, WY, MT, OR, CA, HI, DC, PR	Al Gore

=== Eliminated at convention ===
Candidate	Most recent office	Home state	Campaign Withdrawal date	Popular vote	Contests won
Jerry Brown	Governor of California (1975–1983)	California	(Campaign); Eliminated at Convention: July 15, 1992	4,071,232 (20.20%)	6 AK, CO, CT, ME, NV, VT

=== Withdrew during or before primaries ===
Candidate	Most recent office	Home state	Campaign Withdrawal date	Popular vote	Contests won
Paul Tsongas	U.S. Senator from Massachusetts (1979–1985)	Massachusetts	Suspended Campaign: March 19, 1992; Endorsed Bill Clinton: June 3, 1992	3,656,010 (18.14%)	9 AZ, DA, DE, MD, MA, NH, RI, UT, WA
Tom Harkin	U.S. Senator from Iowa (1985–2015)	Iowa	(Campaign) Withdrew: March 9, 1992; Endorsed Bill Clinton: March 26, 1992	280,304 (1.39%)	3 ID caucus, IA, MN caucus
Bob Kerrey	U.S. Senator from Nebraska (1989–2001)	Nebraska	Withdrew: March 5, 1992; Endorsed Bill Clinton: May 14, 1992	318,457 (1.58%)	1 SD
Douglas Wilder	Governor of Virginia (1990–1994)	Virginia	Withdrew: January 8, 1992; Endorsed Bill Clinton: July 14, 1992	240 (0.00%)	0

=== Minor candidates ===
Other notable individuals campaigning for the nomination but not featuring in major polls were:

Larry Agran	Lyndon LaRouche	Tom Laughlin	Ron Kovic	Eugene McCarthy
Mayor of Irvine, California (1982–1984), (1986–1990)	No Elected Office (Head of the NCLB)	No Elected Office (Actor)	No Elected Office (Anti-war Activist and Author)	U.S. Senator (MN) (1959–1971)

=== Declined ===
Note on Declination Dates: (Note: It isn't always clear when a candidate declines to enter the race, as sometimes potential candidates will decline to run but reignite interest later in the cycle, often resulting in another declination. In light of this, the latest declination found by a prospective candidate is used.)

Dale Bumpers	Michael Dukakis	John Silber	Sam Nunn	Pat Schroeder	George J. Mitchell	George McGovern	Stephen Solarz
U.S. Senator from Arkansas (1975–1999)	Governor of Massachusetts (1975–1979) (1983–1991)	President of Boston University (1971–1996)	U.S. Senator from Georgia (1972–1997)	U.S. Representative from Colorado (1973–1997)	U.S. Senator from Maine (1980–1995)	U.S. Senator from South Dakota (1963–1981)	U.S. Representative from New York (1975–1993)
April 20, 1990	November 25, 1990	March 8, 1991	March 10, 1991	March 13, 1991	March 31, 1991	May 23, 1991	July 5, 1991
Dick Gephardt	Jay Rockefeller	Al Gore	Lloyd Bentsen	Bill Bradley	Dave McCurdy	Jesse Jackson	Mario Cuomo
U.S. Representative from Missouri (1977–2005)	U.S. Senator from West Virginia (1985–2015)	U.S. Senator from Tennessee (1985–1993)	U.S. Senator from Texas (1971–1993)	U.S. Senator from New Jersey (1979–1997)	U.S. Representative from Oklahoma (1981–1995)	Shadow Senator from the District of Columbia (1991–1997)	Governor of New York (1983–1994)
July 17, 1991	August 7, 1991	August 21, 1991	August 28, 1991	August 28, 1991	October 18, 1991	November 2, 1991	December 20, 1991

=== Speculated candidates ===
The following potential candidates were considered possible candidates to run for the Democratic nomination in 1992 by the media, but never stated a preference for or against running.

- Senator Joe Biden of Delaware
- Senator Bob Graham of Florida
- Senator John Kerry of Massachusetts
- Senator Chuck Robb of Virginia
- Governor Ann Richards of Texas
- General Norman Schwarzkopf Jr. of Florida
- Senator Paul Simon of Illinois
- Senator Tim Wirth of Colorado

== Timeline ==
Bush's high approval rating after the Gulf War made many Democrats feel that they could not defeat him in the election. Dick Gephardt, Al Gore, Jesse Jackson, Sam Nunn, and Jay Rockefeller did not enter the race despite speculation around them as candidates.

Clinton, a Southerner with experience governing a more conservative state, positioned himself as a centrist New Democrat. He prepared for a run in 1992 amidst a crowded field seeking to beat the incumbent President George H. W. Bush. In the aftermath of the Persian Gulf War, Bush seemed unbeatable, but an economic recession—which ultimately proved to be small by historical standards—spurred the Democrats on. Tom Harkin won his native Iowa without much surprise. Clinton, meanwhile, was still a relatively unknown national candidate before the primary season when a woman named Gennifer Flowers appeared in the press to reveal allegations of an affair. Clinton sought damage control by appearing on 60 Minutes with his wife, Hillary Clinton, for an interview with Steve Kroft. Paul Tsongas of Massachusetts won the primary in neighboring New Hampshire but Clinton's second-place finish – strengthened by Clinton's speech labeling himself "The Comeback Kid" – re-energized his campaign. Clinton swept nearly all of the Southern Super Tuesday primaries, making him the solid front runner. Jerry Brown, however, began to run a surprising insurgent campaign, particularly through use of a 1-800 number to receive grassroots funding. Brown "seemed to be the most left-wing and right-wing man in the field. [He] called for term limits, a flat tax, and the abolition of the Department of Education." Brown scored surprising wins in Connecticut and Colorado.

On March 17, Tsongas left the race when he decisively lost both the Illinois and Michigan primaries to Clinton, with Brown as a distant third. Exactly one week later, Brown eked out a narrow win in the bitterly fought Connecticut primary. As the press focused on the primaries in New York and Wisconsin, which were both to be held on the same day, Brown, who had taken the lead in polls in both states, made a serious gaffe: he announced to an audience of various leaders of New York City's Jewish community that, if nominated, he would consider the Reverend Jesse Jackson as a vice presidential candidate. Jackson was still a controversial figure in that community and Brown's polling numbers suffered. On April 7, he lost narrowly to Clinton in Wisconsin (37–34), and dramatically in New York (41–26). In addition, his "willingness to break with liberal orthodoxy on taxes led to denunciations from the party regulars, but by the end of the race he had been embraced by much of the Left."

Although Brown continued to campaign in a number of states, he won no further primaries. Despite this, he still had a sizable number of delegates, and a big win in his home state of California would have deprived Clinton of sufficient support to win the nomination. After nearly a month of intense campaigning and multiple debates between the two candidates, Clinton managed to defeat Brown in the California primary by a margin of 47% to 40%. Clinton became the second candidate after George McGovern in 1972 to win the nomination without winning Iowa or New Hampshire. The same feat would be repeated nearly 30 years later by Joe Biden in 2020.

Clinton won 28 of the 35 states that held primaries while only winning 4 of the 16 states that used caucuses. 70% of black voters supported Clinton, 15% supported Brown, and 8% supported Tsongas.

== Schedule and results ==
Tablemaker's Note: (Note: This should not be taken as a finalized list of results. While a significant amount of research was done, most of these results, particularly in regards to delegate allocation, are dependent on reporting from the media. At the present moment there are 77 pledged delegates not accounted for in the table.)

Date (daily totals)	Contest and total popular vote	Awarded pledged delegates	Delegates won and popular vote						
Date (daily totals)	Contest and total popular vote	Awarded pledged delegates	Bill Clinton	Jerry Brown	Paul Tsongas	Tom Harkin	Bob Kerrey	Others	Uncommitted
February 10	Iowa; Caucuses; 2,996 CDs	0 of (49)	76 CDs (2.81%)	51 CDs (1.60%)	128 CDs (4.11%)	2,314 CDs (76.55%)	72 CDs (2.41%)	-	355 CDs (11.85%)
February 18	New Hampshire; Primary; 167,664	18 of (18)	9 Del. 41,540 (24.78%)	13,659 (8.15%)	9 Del. 55,663 (33.20%)	17,063 (10.18%)	18,584 (11.08%)	21,155 (12.62%)	-
February 22	Maine; Caucuses; 3,368 SDs	0 of (24)	501 SDs (14.88%)	1,026 SDs (30.46%)	970 SDs (28.80%)	174 SDs (5.17%) (Note: Main source combined the results for Harkin and Kerrey; secondary source is used with partial results, with 645 of 665 precincts reporting.)	105 SDs (3.12%)	-	548 SDs (16.27%)
February 25	South Dakota; Primary; 59,794	15 of (15)	3 Del. 11,421 (19.10%)	2,304 (3.86%)	5,756 (9.62%)	5 Del. 15,153 (25.23%)	7 Del. 23,974 (40.12%)	1,238 (2.07%)	-
March 3 (380)	Colorado; Primary; 239,643	47 of (47)	14 Del. 64,470 (26.90%)	18 Del. 69,073 (28.82%)	15 Del. 61,360 (25.61%)	5,866 (2.45%)	29,572 (12.34%)	3,946 (1.65%)	5,356 (2.24%)
March 3 (380)	Georgia; Primary; 454,631	76 of (76)	54 Del. 259,907 (57.17%)	36,808 (8.10%)	22 Del. 109,148 (24.01%)	9,479 (2.09%)	22,033 (4.85%)	-	17,256 (3.80%)
March 3 (380)	Idaho; Caucuses; 372 SDs	0 of (18)	43 SDs (11.56%)	17 SDs (4.57%)	107 SDs (28.76%)	110 SDs (29.57%)	30 SDs (8.06%)	-	65 SDs (17.47%)
March 3 (380)	Maryland; Primary; 531,068	67 of (67)	29 Del. 189,905 (35.76%)	46,480 (8.75%)	38 Del. 230,490 (43.40%)	32,899 (6.20%)	27,035 (5.09%)	4,259 (0.80)	-
March 3 (380)	Minnesota; Caucuses	0 of (92)	(10.3%)	(8.2%)	(19.2%)	(26.7%)	(7.6%)	-	(24.3%)
March 3 (380)	Utah; Caucuses; 31,429	23 of (23)	5 Del. 5,763 (18.34%)	9 Del. 8,972 (28.55%)	9 Del. 10,761 (34.24%)	1,267 (4.03%)	3,442 (10.95%)	598 (1.90%)	726 (2.31%)
March 3 (380)	Washington; Caucuses ? CDs (Note: The last reported results did not include King County, which accounted for about a third of the expected total.)	0 of (72)	835 CDs (15.9%)	1,019 CDs (19.1%)	1,485 CDs (27.9%)	397 CDs (7.5%)	221 CDs (4.1%)	-	1,293 SDs (24.3%)
March 3 (380)	American Samoa; Caucuses; 31,429	3 of (3)	(9%)	-	-	-	-	(4%)	3 Del. (87%)
March 7	Arizona; Caucuses; 36,727	41 of (41)	15 Del. 10,607 (29.28%)	12 Del. 10,145 (27.62%)	14 Del. 12,663 (34.48%)	2,831 (7.71%)	-	-	334 (0.91%)
March 7	South Carolina; Primary; 116,414	43 of (43)	36 Del. 73,221 (62.90%)	6,961 (5.98%)	7 Del. 21,338 (18.33%)	7,657 (6.58%)	566 (0.49%)	-	-
March 7	Wyoming; Caucuses; 274 SDs	0 of (11)	78 SDs (28.57%)	63 SDs (23.08%)	32 SDs (11.72%)	39 SDs (14.29%)	–	1 SD (0.36%)	61 SDs (22.26%)
March 8	Nevada; Caucuses; 1,546 CDs (Note: 2 of 54 Precincts had not yet reported.)	0 of (17)	400 CDs (25.87%)	542 CDs (35.06%)	305 CDs (19.73%)	16 CDs (1.03%)	6 CDs (0.39%)	6 CDs (0.39%)	266 CDs (17.21%)
March 10 (Super Tuesday) (777)	Delaware; Caucuses; 318 SDs; 2,503	0 of (14)	66 SDs (20.75%); 520 (20.78%)	62 SDs (17.47%); 488 (19.50%)	96 SDs (30.19%); 755 (30.16%)	–	–	-	94 SDs (29.56%); 740 (29.56%)
March 10 (Super Tuesday) (777)	Florida; Primary; 1,092,448	148 of (148)	87 Del. 554,861 (50.79%)	3 Del. 133,156 (12.19%)	58 Del. 379,572 (34.75%)	13,302 (1.22%)	11,557 (1.06%)	-	-
March 10 (Super Tuesday) (777)	Hawaii; Caucuses; 2,966	0 of (20)	1,501 (50.61%)	409 (13.79%)	421 (14.19%)	406 (13.69%)	13 (0.44%)	-	216 (7.28%)
March 10 (Super Tuesday) (777)	Louisiana; Primary; 384,426	60 of (60)	59 Del. 267,029 (69.46%)	25,480 (6.63%)	1 Del. 42,509 (11.06%)	4,033 (1.05%)	2,984 (0.78%)	42,391 (11.03%)	-
March 10 (Super Tuesday) (777)	Massachusetts; Primary; 794,115	94 of (94)	86,817 (10.95%)	6 Del. 115,746 (14.60%)	88 Del. 526,297 (66.38%)	3,764 (0.48%)	5,409 (0.68%)	12,218 (1.54%)	43,864 (5.52%)
March 10 (Super Tuesday) (777)	Mississippi; Primary; 191,200	39 of (39)	39 Del. 139,893 (73.11%)	18,396 (9.61%)	15,538 (8.12%)	2,509 (1.31%)	1,660 (0.87%)	1,394 (0.73%)	11,807 (6.18%)
March 10 (Super Tuesday) (777)	Missouri; Caucuses; 963 DDs (Note: District Delegate count is with only 98.9% results reported, and there may have been others not recorded.); 22,500	0 of (92)	434 DDs (45.07%); 10,148 (45.10%)	55 DDs (5.71%); 1,282 (5.70%)	98 DDs (10.18%); 2,295 (10.20%)	–	–	-	376 DDs (39.04%); 8,775 (39.00%)
March 10 (Super Tuesday) (777)	Oklahoma; Primary; 416,129	45 of (45)	38 Del. 293,266 (70.47%)	7 Del. 69,624 (16.69%)	–	14,015 (3.40%)	13,252 (3.20%)	25,972 (3.20%)	-
March 10 (Super Tuesday) (777)	Rhode Island; Primary; 50,402	22 of (22)	6 Del. 10,762 (21.22%)	3 Del. 9,541 (18.82%)	13 Del. 26,825 (52.90%)	319 (0.63%)	469 (0.92%)	1,783 (3.54%)	703 (1.39%)
March 10 (Super Tuesday) (777)	Tennessee; Primary; 318,482	68 of (68)	56 Del. 214,485 (67.35%)	25,560 (8.02%)	12 Del. 61,717 (19.38%)	2,099 (0.66%)	1,638 (0.51%)	432 (0.14%)	12,551 (3.94%)
March 10 (Super Tuesday) (777)	Texas; Primary; 1,483,047	196 of (196)	94 Del. 972,235 (65.56%)	2 Del. 118,869 (8.02%)	31 Del. 285,224 (19.23%)	19,618 (1.32%)	20,298 (1.37%)	66,803 (4.50%)	-
March 17 (295)	Illinois; Primary; 1,504,130	164 of (164)	107 Del. 776,829 (51.65%)	11 Del. 220,346 (14.65%)	46 Del. 387,891 (25.79%)	30,710 (2.04%)	10,916 (0.73%)	9,826 (0.65%)	67,612 (4.50%)
March 17 (295)	Michigan; Primary; 585,972	131 of (131)	74 Del. 297,280 (50.73%)	37 Del. 151,400 (25.84%)	20 Del. 97,017 (16.56%)	6,265 (1.07%)	3,219 (0.55%)	2,955 (0.50%)	27,836 (4.75%)
March 19	Democrats Abroad; Caucuses	?	? (27.00%)	–	? (37.00%)	(7.00%)	–	-	-
March 19	North Dakota; Caucuses; 974	0 of (14)	448 (46.00%)	73 (7.49%)	100 (10.27%)	66 (6.78%)	12 (1.23%)	23 (2.36%)	252 (25.87%)
March 24	Connecticut; Primary; 173,119	53 of (53)	22 Del. 61,698 (35.64%)	21 Del. 64,472 (37.24%)	10 Del. 33,811 (19.53%)	1,919 (1.11%)	1,169 (0.68%)	4,620 (2.67%)	5,430 (3.14%)
March 28	Iowa; County Conventions; 2,998 CDs	0 of (49)	347 CDs (11.57%)	280 CDs (9.34%)	-	1,105 CDs (36.86%)	-	32 CDs (1.08%)	1,234 CDs (41.16%)
March 28	Virgin Islands; Caucuses; 31,429	3 of (3)	1 Del. (42%)	-	-	-	-	(4%)	2 Del. (58%)
March 31	Vermont; Caucus; 1,209 SDs (Note: Only 94% of precincts were reported in by the time of the source.)	0 of (15)	208 SDs (17.20%)	573 SDs (47.40%)	117 SDs (9.68%)	–	–	-	311 SDs (25.72%)
April 2	Alaska; Caucus; 2,907 DDs (Note: Only 96% of precincts were reported in by the time of the source.)	0 of (13)	884 DDs (30.41%)	964 DDs (33.16%)	-	–	–	-	1,059 DDs (36.43%)
April 5	North Dakota; State Convention	14 of (14)	3 Del.	-	-	-	-	-	9 Del.
April 5	Puerto Rico; Primary; 64,962	51 of (51)	51 Del. 62,273 (95.86%)	921 (1.42%)	59 (0.09%)	31 (0.05%)	930 (1.43%)	504 (0.78%)	244 (0.38%)
April 7	Kansas; Primary; 160,251	36 of (36)	27 Del. 82,145 (51.26%)	2 Del. 20,811 (12.99%)	6 Del. 24,413 (15.23%)	940 (0.59%)	2,215 (1.38%)	2,215 (1.38%)	1 Del. 22,159 (13.83%)
April 7	Minnesota; Primary; 204,402	0 of (92)	63,584 (31.14%)	62,474 (30.60%)	43,588 (21.35%)	4,077 (2.00%)	1,191 (0.58%)	17,890 (8.75%)	11,366 (5.56%)
April 7	New York; Primary; 1,007,726	244 of (244)	102 Del. 412,349 (40.92%)	67 Del. 264,278 (26.23%)	75 Del. 288,330 (28.61%)	11,535 (1.15%)	11,147 (1.11%)	20,087 (1.99%)	-
April 7	Wisconsin; Primary; 772,597	82 of (82)	34 Del. 287,356 (37.19%)	29 Del. 266,207 (34.46%)	19 Del. 168,619 (21.83%)	5,395 (0.70%)	3,044 (0.39%)	3,044 (3.43%)	26,489 (2.00%)
April 11	Nevada; County Conventions; 271 SDs (Note: Only results from Washoe County were found.)	0 of (17)	87 SDs (32.10%)	114 SDs (42.07%)	40 SDs (30.19%)	–	–	-	30 SDs (29.56%)
April 11	Virginia; Caucuses	0 of (78)	(52.00%)	(12.00%)	–	–	–	–	(36.00%)
April 14	Missouri; District Conventions (Note: The 1st thru 9th Districts held their conventions at this and earlier dates; this is the culminated result of those conventions.)	50 of (92)	24 Del.	2 Del.	3 Del.	-	-	-	21 Del.
April 25	Delaware; State Convention	15 of (15)	3 Del.	3 Del.	4 Del.	-	-	-	5 Del.
April 25	Missouri; District Conventions (Note: This is the remainder of the conventions to be held.)	25 of (92)	10 Del.	-	-	-	-	-	15 Del.
April 25	Washington; County Conventions; 2,003 DDs	0 of (72)	533 DDs (26.61%)	476 DDs (23.76%)	432 DDs (21.57%)	-	-	1 DDs (0.05%)	561 DDs (28.01%)
April 28	Pennsylvania; Primary; 1,265,495 (Note: Only 90% of precincts were reported in by the time of the source, so the delegate count may have fluctuated.)	169 of (169)	112 Del. 715,031 (56.48%)	50 Del. 325,543 (25.72%)	7 Del. 161,572 (12.76%)	21,013 (1.66%)	20,802 (1.64%)	21,534 (1.70%)	-
May 2	Iowa; District Conventions	32 of (49)	4 Del.	1 Del.	-	17 Del.	-	-	10 Del.
May 2	Missouri; State Convention	17 of (92)	9 Del.	1 Del.	2 Del.	-	-	-	5 Del.
May 2	Nevada; State Convention	17 of (17)	8 Del.	6 Del.	-	-	-	-	3 Del.
May 2	Wyoming; State Convention	11 of (11)	5 Del.	3 Del.	-	-	-	-	3 Del.
May 3	Guam; Caucuses; 1,020	3 of (3)	1 Del. 500 (49%)	204 (20%)	-	-	-	-	2 Del. 316 (31%)
May 5	Indiana; Primary; 476,849	77 of (77)	57 Del. 301,905 (63.31%)	20 Del. 102,379 (21.47%)	58,215 (12.21%)	–	14,350 (3.01%)	–	–
May 5	North Carolina; Primary; 691,866	84 of (84)	72 Del. 443,498 (54.10%)	71,984 (10.40%)	57,589 (8.32%)	5,891 (0.85%)	6,216 (0.90%)	-	12 Del. 106,697 (15.42%)
May 5	Washington D.C. Primary; 61,842	17 of (17)	17 Del. 45,685 (73.87%)	57,589 (7.21%)	71,984 (10.41%)	–	–	–	5,262 (8.51%)
May 9	Minnesota; District Conventions (Note: Some of the district conventions were held on a different date, but information on those contests wasn't found amongst sources. The culminated results were reported, and the latest date of the district conventions is used here.)	63 of (92)	10 Del.	4 Del.	-	-	-	-	49 Del.
May 12	Nebraska; Primary; 150,587	25 of (25)	13 Del. 68,562 (45.53%)	8 Del. 31,673 (21.03%)	10,707 (7.11%)	4,239 (2.82%)	–	10,692 (7.10%)	4 Del. 24,714 (16.41%)
May 12	West Virginia; Primary; 317,587	31 of (31)	31 Del. 227,815 (74.24%)	36,505 (11.90%)	21,271 (6.93%)	2,774 (0.90%)	3,152 (1.03%)	15,349 (4.83%)	10,721 (3.38%)
May 16	Vermont; State Convention	15 of (15)	3 Del.	6 Del.	-	-	-	-	6 Del.
May 17	Maine; State Convention	24 of (24)	6 Del.	10 Del.	5 Del.	-	-	-	3 Del.
May 19	Oregon; Primary; 354,332	47 of (47)	29 Del. 159,802 (45.10%)	18 Del. 110,494 (31.18%)	37,139 (10.48%)	–	–	46,897 (13.24%)	–
May 19	Washington; Primary; 147,981	0 of (72)	62,171 (42.01%)	34,111 (23.05%)	18,981 (12.83%)	1,858 (1.26%)	1,489 (1.01%)	29,371 (19.85%)	-
May 26	Arkansas; Primary; 506,679	36 of (36)	30 Del. 344,758 (68.04%)	55,800 (11.01%)	–	–	–	14,719 (2.90%)	6 Del. 91,402 (18.04%)
May 26	Idaho; Primary; Primary; 55,124	0 of (18)	27,004 (48.99%)	9,212 (16.71%)	–	–	–	2,879 (5.22%)	16,029 (29.08%)
May 26	Kentucky; Primary; Primary; 370,578	52 of (52)	34 Del. 207,804 (56.08%)	30,709 (8.29%)	18,097 (4.88%)	7,136 (1.93%)	3,242 (0.87%)	-	18 Del. 103,590 (27.95%)
May 30	Washington; District Conventions	46 of (72)	15 Del.	10 Del.	9 Del.	-	-	-	12 Del.
May 31	Alaska; State Convention	14 of (14)	5 Del.	-	-	-	-	-	8 Del.
May 31	Hawaii; State Convention (Note: The delegate allocation is assumed from the caucuses; no definitive result was found amongst later reports of the convention.)	20 of (20)	16 Del.	2 Del.	-	2 Del.	-	-	-
June 2	Alabama; Primary; 450,899	55 of (55)	43 Del. 307,621 (68.22%)	30,626 (6.79%)	–	–	–	18,097 (4.83%)	12 Del. 90,863 (20.15%)
June 2	California; Primary; 2,863,419	348 of (348)	191 Del. 1,359,112 (47.47%)	157 Del. 1,150,460 (40.18%)	212,522 (7.42%)	–	33,935 (1.19%)	107,390 (3.75%)	–
June 2	Montana; Primary; 117,471	16 of (16)	8 Del. 54,989 (46.81%)	3 Del. 21,704 (18.48%)	12,614 (10.74%)	–	–	–	5 Del. 28,164 (23.98%)
June 2	New Jersey; Primary; 405,222	105 of (105)	73 Del. 256,337 (63.26%)	26 Del. 79,877 (19.71%)	45,191 (11.15%)	–	–	2 Del. 23,817 (5.88%)	–
June 2	New Mexico; Primary; 181,443	25 of (25)	17 Del. 95,933 (52.87%)	3 Del. 30,705 (16.92%)	11,315 (6.24%)	3,233 (1.78%)	–	4,988 (2.75%)	5 Del. 35,269 (19.44%)
June 2	Ohio; Primary; 1,042,235	151 of (151)	113 Del. 638,347 (61.25%)	34 Del. 197,449 (18.94%)	1 Del. 110,673 (10.62%)	25,395 (2.44%)	22,976 (2.20%)	3 Del. (Note: These 3 delegates represent those won by Louis Stokes, who ran as a favorite-son candidate in his congressional district.); 47,395 (4.55%)	-
June 6	Minnesota; State Convention	29 of (92)	7 Del.	3 Del.	-	-	-	1 Del. (Note: One delegate was awarded to Larry Agran.)	18 Del.
June 6	Virginia; State Convention (Note: Most of the delegates were selected through District Conventions, but information on these was sparse; as a result, the total result is collected here.)	78 of (78)	58 Del.	3 Del.	-	-	-	-	17 Del.
June 7	Washington; State Convention	26 of (72)	8 Del.	6 Del.	5 Del.	-	-	-	7 Del.
June 9	North Dakota; Primary; 32,786	0 of (14)	4,760 (14.52%)	–	–	–	–	28,026 (85.48%) (Note: Ross Perot won the primary with 9,516 write-in votes at (29.02%), Lyndon LaRouche came second with 7,003 votes at (21.36%), Charles Woods came third with 6,641 votes at (20.26%), and Tom Shiekman came fourth with 4,866 votes at (14.84%).)	–
June 20	Idaho; State Convention	18 of (18)	4 Del.	-	4 Del.	5 Del.	-	-	5 Del.
June 21	Iowa; State Convention	17 of (49)	3 Del.	-	-	9 Del.	-	-	5 Del.
Total pledged delegates (3,517) (Note: This does not include the approximately 772 superdelegates, who are uncommitted by default.)			1,997 (56.78%)	588 (16.72%)	533 (15.15%)	38 (1.08%)	7 (0.20%)	6 (0.17%)	271 (7.71%)

== Polling ==
=== Nationwide ===
Poll source	Publication	Jerry Brown	Bill Clinton	Tom Harkin	Bob Kerrey	Paul Tsongas	Other	Undecided
Gallup	Sep. 1991	21%	6%	6%	5%	5%	?	—
Gallup	Nov. 1991	21%	9%	10%	10%	7%	?	—
Gallup	Jan. 1992	21%	17%	9%	11%	6%	?	—
New York Times/CBS News	Jan. 1992	?	22%	?	?	10%	?	—
Gallup	Feb. 2, 1992	21%	42%	9%	10%	9%	?	—
New York Times/CBS News	Feb. 22, 1992	10%	29%	3%	4%	24%	4% (Note: "Someone else" with 4%)	26%

=== State polling ===
==== New Hampshire ====
Poll source	Publication	Sample size	MoE	Jerry Brown	Bill Clinton	Mario Cuomo	Tom Harkin	Bob Kerrey	Paul Tsongas	Other	Undecided
USA Today–CNN–Gallup	Feb. 12–14	600 V	±5%	6%	23%	–	14%	10%	39%	–	8%
Boston Globe–WBZ-TV	Feb. 13–14	400 LV	±5%	5%	25%	4%	11%	11%	32%	4%	8%
Mason-Dixon	Feb. 13–15	433 V	±5%	4%	21%	4%	9%	8%	34%	–	20%

== The convention ==
The convention met in New York City, and the official tally was:

- Bill Clinton 3,372
- Jerry Brown 596
- Paul Tsongas 209
- Penn. Gov. Robert P. Casey 10
- Rep. Pat Schroeder 8
- Larry Agran 3
- Ron Daniels 1
- Al Gore 1
- Joe Simonetta 1

Clinton chose U.S. Senator Albert A. Gore Jr. (D-Tennessee) to be his running mate on July 9, 1992. Choosing Gore, who is from Clinton's neighboring state of Tennessee, went against the popular strategy of balancing a Southern candidate with a Northern partner. Gore did serve to balance the ticket in other ways, as he was perceived as strong on foreign policy and environmental issues, while Clinton was not. Also, Gore's similarities to Clinton allowed him to push some of his key campaign themes, such as centrism and generational change.

Before Gore's selection, other politicians were mentioned as a possible running-mate, e.g. Bob Kerrey, Dick Gephardt, Mario Cuomo, Indiana Representative Lee H. Hamilton, Pennsylvania Senator Harris Wofford, Florida Senator Bob Graham, and Massachusetts Senator John Kerry.

The Democratic Convention in New York City was essentially a solidification of the party around Clinton and Gore, though there was controversy over whether Jerry Brown, who did not endorse Clinton, would be allowed to speak. Brown did speak at the convention by seconding his own nomination.

Another additional controversy concerned Pennsylvania Governor Bob Casey, who sought a speaking slot at the convention but was not granted one. Casey complained that it was because of his outspoken anti-abortion views: he had warned the platform committee that Democrats were committing political suicide because of their support for abortion rights. Clinton supporters have said that Casey was not allowed to speak because he had not endorsed the ticket.

== Popular vote results ==
Total popular vote number in primaries:

- Bill Clinton - 10,482,411 (52.01%)
- Jerry Brown - 4,071,232 (20.20%)
- Paul Tsongas - 3,656,010 (18.14%)
- Unpledged - 750,873 (3.73%)
- Bob Kerrey - 318,457 (1.58%)
- Tom Harkin - 280,304 (1.39%)
- Lyndon LaRouche - 154,599 (0.77%)
- Eugene McCarthy - 108,678 (0.54%)
- Charles Woods - 88,948 (0.44%)
- Larry Agran - 58,611 (0.29%)
- Ross Perot - 54,755 (0.27%)
- Ralph Nader - 35,935 (0.18%)
- Louis Stokes - 29,983 (0.15%)
- Angus Wheeler McDonald - 9,900 (0.05%)
- J. Louis McAlpine - 7,911 (0.04%)
- George W. Benns - 7,887 (0.04%)
- Rufus T. Higginbotham - 7,705 (0.04%)
- Tod Howard Hawks - 7,434 (0.04%)
- Stephen Bruke - 5,261 (0.03%)
- Tom Laughlin - 5,202 (0.03%)
- Tom Shiekman - 4,965 (0.03%)
- Jeffrey F. Marsh - 2,445 (0.01%)
- George Ballard - 2,067 (0.01%)
- Ray Rollinson - 1,206 (0.01%)
- Lenora Fulani - 402 (0.00%)
- Douglas Wilder - 240 (0.00%)

== Maps ==
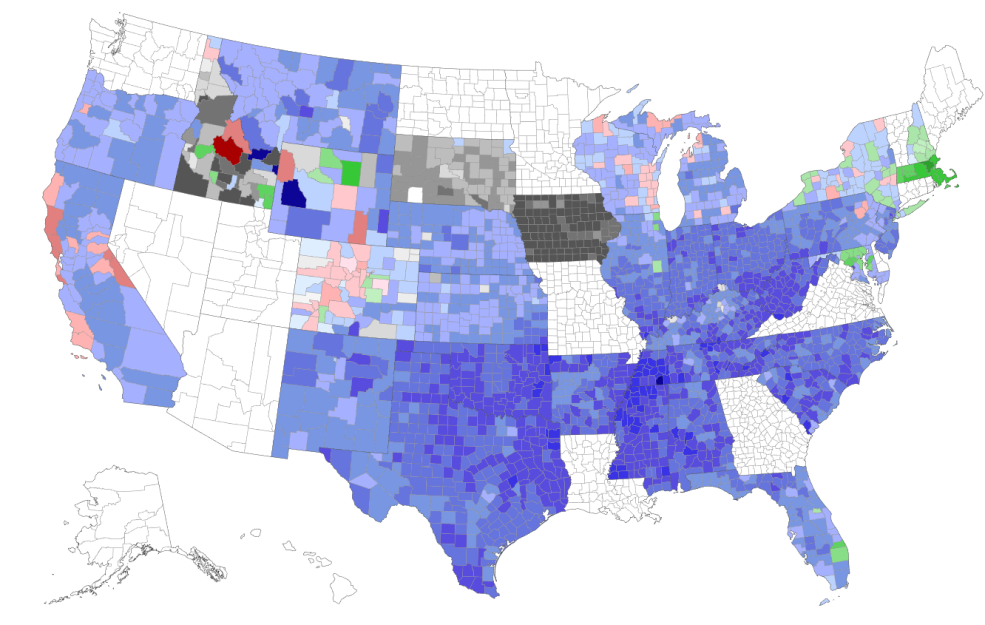
Results by county

== Convention tallies ==
For President:

- Bill Clinton - 3,372 (80.27%)
- Jerry Brown - 596 (14.19%)
- Paul Tsongas - 209 (4.98%)
- Robert P. Casey - 10 (0.24%)
- Patricia Schroeder - 8 (0.19%)
- Larry Agran - 3 (0.07%)
- Ron Daniels - 1 (0.02%)
- Al Gore - 1 (0.02%)
- Joe Simonetta 1 (0.02%)

== Vice presidential nomination ==
Clinton selected Tennessee Senator and 1988 candidate Al Gore to be his running-mate. Among other confirmed possible V.P. nominees, who were finalists of Clinton's selection were:

- Jay Rockefeller, U.S. senator from West Virginia
- Bob Graham, U.S. senator from Florida
- Lee H. Hamilton, U.S. representative from Indiana.
- Tom Harkin, U.S. senator from Iowa
- Bob Kerrey, U.S. senator from Nebraska
- George Mitchell, U.S. Senate Majority Leader from Maine
- Paul Tsongas, former U.S. senator from Massachusetts
- Doug Wilder, Governor of Virginia
- Harris Wofford, U.S. senator from Pennsylvania

Clinton's list of finalists did not include Senator Bill Bradley of New Jersey and Governor of New York Mario Cuomo, who publicly disavowed interest in the vice presidency.

=== Convention tally for vice president ===
- Al Gore - was nominated by acclamation on a voice vote.

== In popular media ==
The story of the race was covered in the 1993 documentary film The War Room and fictionalized into the 1996 novel and 1998 film Primary Colors.

== See also ==
- 1992 Republican Party presidential primaries

== Bibliography ==
- My Life by Bill Clinton, 2004, Vintage. ISBN 1-4000-3003-X

== Works cited ==
- Abramson, Paul; Aldrich, John; Rohde, David (1995). Change and Continuity in the 1992 Elections. CQ Press. ISBN 0871878399.
