= Tom Harkin 1992 presidential campaign =

United States political campaign

Tom Harkin 1992
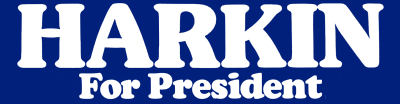
- Campaign: 1992 Democratic Party presidential primaries
- Candidate: Tom Harkin; United States Senator from Iowa (1985-2015)
- Affiliation: Democratic Party
- Status: Dropped out on March 9, 1992
- Announced: September 15, 1991

The 1992 presidential campaign of Tom Harkin, a U.S. Senator from Iowa, began with a campaign rally on September 15, 1991. Harkin had first been elected to a national office in 1974 as a member of the House of Representatives, serving from 1975 to 1985, when he became a senator. A member of the Democratic Party, Harkin established himself as a populist liberal, supporting New Deal-style policies while receiving broad support from organized labor and left-leaning voters. Harkin was very critical of then-President George H. W. Bush, a conservative Republican, and positioned himself as the most liberal candidate in the Democratic field. His policy positions included support for a national health insurance system, cuts to military funding, and increased funding for infrastructure.

Going into 1992, Harkin began to decline in opinion polls and lag behind other candidates, such as Arkansas Governor Bill Clinton and Massachusetts Senator Paul Tsongas. While he won the Iowa caucuses in a landslide as a favorite son, he had a poor showing in the New Hampshire primaries and continued to struggle in subsequent primaries. On March 9, the day before Super Tuesday, he withdrew from the race and subsequently announced his support for Clinton. Clinton went on to win the Democratic nomination and later the presidency, with Harkin campaigning for him in both the remaining primaries and the general election. Harkin returned to the Senate, where he served for over two more decades before retiring in 2015.

== Background ==
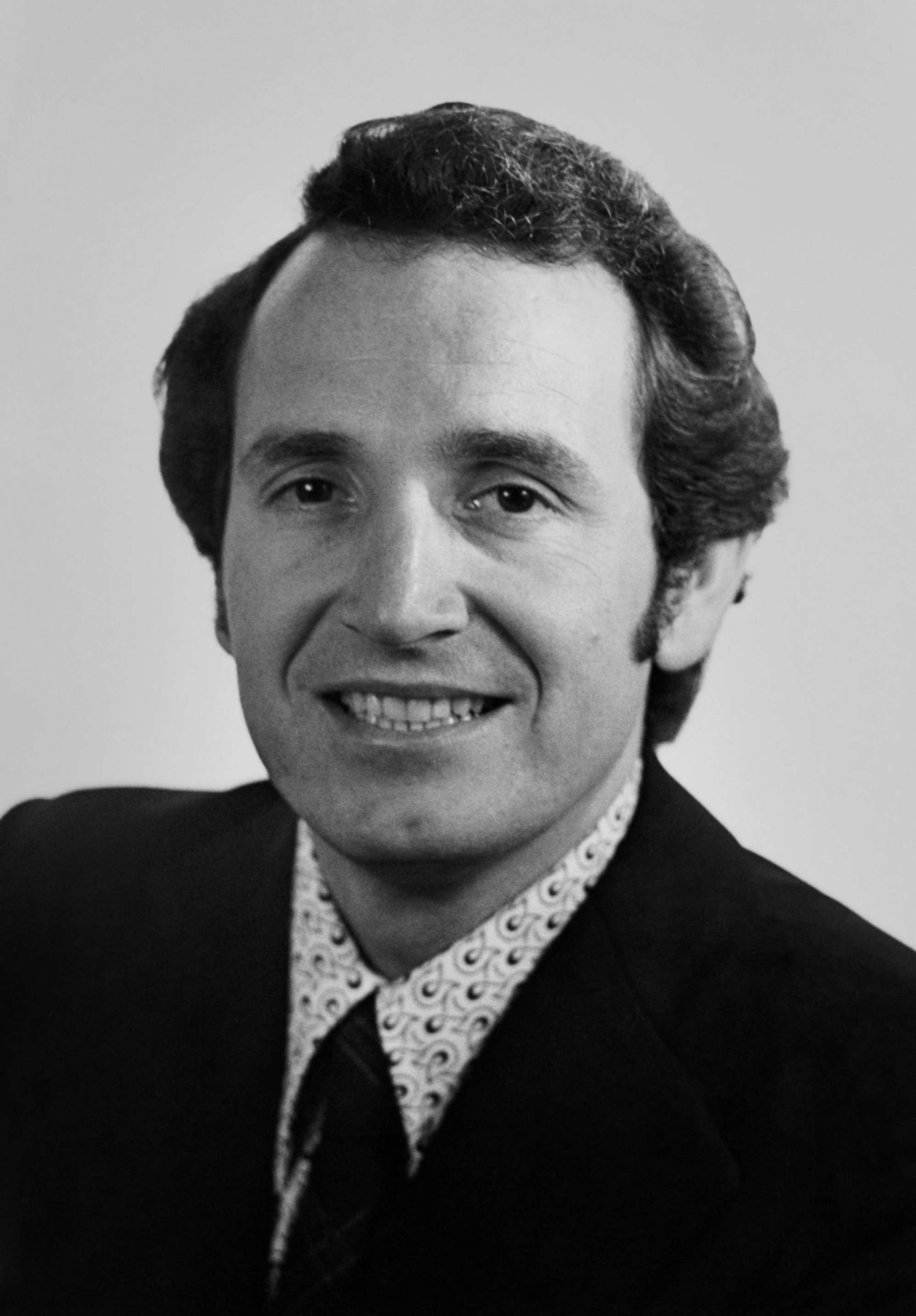
Official House photo of Tom Harkin, 1979

Tom Harkin was born in Cumming, Iowa, in 1939. He graduated from Iowa State University in 1962 and later from the Catholic University of America's Columbus School of Law in 1972, receiving a Bachelor of Arts and a Juris Doctor, respectively. From 1962 to 1967, he served in the United States Navy. Upon graduating from Columbus, he began to practice law in Des Moines, Iowa, and in 1974 he was elected to the United States House of Representatives as a member of the Democratic Party, serving from 1975 to 1985. In 1984, he was elected to the United States Senate, taking office the following year. During the 1988 United States presidential election, Harkin was rumored to be a possible candidate, but he declined to run so as not to compete against other Democratic colleagues who were campaigning in Iowa. In 1990, he became the first Democratic senator from Iowa Elected and re-elected to two full six year terms.

In government, Harkin was a populist liberal, almost always voting with the Democratic party line. The liberal political advocacy group Americans for Democratic Action gave him a 90 percent approval rating for his senatorial career, ranking higher than Ted Kennedy, a noted liberal senator from Massachusetts. His policy positions included support for abortion rights and farmers' interests and cutting funding for the United States Department of Defense. Additionally, he had been an advocate for people with disabilities and was one of the main sponsors in the Senate of the Americans with Disabilities Act of 1990. He was often critical of some other Democrats who he felt were pulling the party away from the New Deal-style liberal politics that the party had historically espoused and towards conservative positions typically championed by the Republican Party.

== Expressed interest ==
Through early 1991, Harkin began to hold a series of speeches across the country, with journalists Jack Germond and Jules Witcover of The Baltimore Sun reporting in May of that year that he was considering running in the 1992 United States presidential election. While the two journalists called his possible candidacy "a long shot", they also stated that he would most likely win that year's Iowa caucuses as a favorite son. At the time, only one other Democrat had officially announced their candidacy, former Senator Paul Tsongas of Massachusetts. Harkin stated that he would consider running if he felt that people were receptive to his ideas. By July, he stated that he would make an official announcement regarding a campaign in September. Harkin continued to travel and make speeches during this time, with journalist Bill Stall of the Los Angeles Times comparing his policy positions to those of President John F. Kennedy's New Frontier and his speaking abilities to Presidents Abraham Lincoln and Harry S. Truman. Harkin noted that one of the biggest issues that would face his campaign would be a lack of name recognition, but that he could overcome that through the course of the race. During this time, some of the policy proposals put forward by Harkin included redirecting funds for the United States Armed Forces towards domestic issues such as infrastructure, crime, health care, support for a balanced budget amendment. Additionally, Harkin wanted to appeal to blue-collar Reagan Democrats by increasing taxes on the wealthiest Americans to alleviate the tax burden on the working class. With regards to foreign policy, Harkin was generally considered a protectionist, and he expressed support for Israel in the Israeli–Palestinian conflict Journalist Steve Daley stated that as a candidate, Harkin would probably receive much of his financial support from organized labor and Jewish voters.

== Campaign developments ==
=== Announcement ===
On September 15, 1991, speaking to a crowd of about 2,000 people on a farm in Madison County, Iowa, Harkin officially announced his candidacy for president of the United States. In his announcement, he criticized President George H. W. Bush, a Republican, for not helping the average American and said, "I'm here today to tell you that George Herbert Walker Bush has got feet of clay and I intend to take a hammer to them". He additionally attacked the president's policy of supply-side economics, which he called "trickle-down economics" and a "failed economic experiment", and promised greater investments in infrastructure and a "percolate up" economic policy that would help the middle class. Harkin stated that funds for this investment could come from military expenditures, which he said were too high in light of the fact that the Cold War had ended. During the rally, American flags were prevalent and the Pledge of Allegiance was said at the beginning, which, according to journalist Robin Toner of The New York Times, showed "the determination of many Democrats never again to let the Republicans seize control of the symbols of patriotism, as they often seemed to do in 1988". At the time of his announcement, Democrats Tsongas and Virginia Governor Douglas Wilder had already entered the race, while former California Governor Jerry Brown, Arkansas Governor Bill Clinton and Senator Bob Kerrey of Nebraska were expected to enter the race in the following weeks.

=== Early campaign events ===
On October 5, Clinton, who by this time had entered the race, and Harkin participated in a forum in Iowa moderated by Senator Jay Rockefeller of West Virginia to discuss healthcare issues, with Harkin advocating for a national health insurance system that emphasized preventive healthcare. By that month, the field of candidates who had officially announced they were running had expanded to include Brown, Clinton, Harkin, Kerrey, Tsongas, and Wilder. Of the candidates running at the time, Harkin was considered the furthest to the political left. On November 7, he gave a speech before the American Section of the World Jewish Congress in New York City where he stated that Bush was too soft on Middle Eastern dictators such as Hafez al-Assad of Syria and Saddam Hussein of Iraq. He also pledged that, as president, he would support moving the United States Embassy in Tel Aviv to Jerusalem, would approve $10 billion in loans to Israel to assist with resettling Jewish immigrants from the former Soviet Union, and would support the continued Israeli occupation of the Golan Heights. Later that month, on November 22, Harkin was one of several Democratic candidates to speak at a Chicago meeting of the Association of State Democratic Chairs, where he continued to outline his economic plans of increased spending for infrastructure and public services by cutting defense spending and stated that he was more concerned with promoting economic growth than in reducing the federal budget deficit.

By December, Harkin stated this his number one priority as president would be the institution of a national health care system, and he also proposed a national service program where people would have their tertiary education paid for in exchange for working for some time in a public service job, such as a teacher or health professional. On December 15, Harkin participated in a debate that was broadcast by NBC and also included Brown, Clinton, Kerrey, Tsongas, and Wilder. Also in December, New York Governor Mario Cuomo, a progressive who had been expected to seek the Democratic nomination for president in 1992, officially declined to run, which some commentators saw as helping Harkin by enforcing his status as the most progressive candidate in the field. A December 26 article in The New York Times stated that Harkin's campaign was the best-financed within the Democratic Party, with his campaign having $1.1 million in money that would qualify for matching funds. This placed him first in the field, with Clinton in second place with $581,000, though still behind Bush, who had $2.6 million.

=== Caucuses and primaries ===
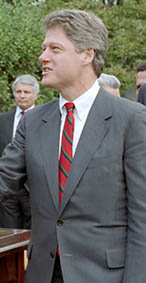
Going into 1992, Arkansas Governor Bill Clinton emerged as the frontrunner for the Democratic nomination.

Going into January 1992, Harkin's fundraising had begun to slow down, and he was polling in the single digits in opinion polls held in New Hampshire, while Clinton had continued to grow in popularity and fundraising. Leading up to the New Hampshire presidential primary, Harkin was polling at five percent, behind Clinton, Tsongas, and Kerrey. In one poll, he was tied in fourth place with Brown, who had not been campaigning actively in New Hampshire. Also during this time, there were reports that leaders for influential labor unions such as the American Federation of State, County and Municipal Employees and the American Federation of Teachers were leaning towards supporting Clinton over Harkin, which would have seriously damaged his base of support. In a poll from The Boston Globe published January 20, he had fallen to fifth place in New Hampshire, polling at eight percent and only ahead of Brown. That same night, he participated with four other candidates for a presidential debate moderated by Cokie Roberts wherein he sharply criticized his fellow campaigners. According to political strategists, Harkin needed to finish in third place at worst in the primary to remain a viable candidate. By February 10, he was polling at about ten percent in the state.

On February 10, Harkin won the Iowa caucuses in a landslide, receiving about three quarters of the total vote. No other candidate received more than five percent of the total vote, with "uncommitted" being the second most common response from voters behind Harkin. However, because Harkin's win was expected, the voter turnout was significantly lower than in previous years. In 1988, about 120,000 people voted, compared to just 30,000 in 1992. While his win had been expected in Iowa, he was still trailing significantly in New Hampshire, with Harkin polling at 11 percent in a Gallup poll sponsored by CNN and USA Today on February 11. This placed him behind Tsongas (33 percent) and Clinton (26 percent), but above Brown (8 percent). On February 18, Harkin finished fourth in the New Hampshire primary, behind Tsongas, Clinton, and Kerrey. However, despite the poor finish, Harkin remained in the race and continued to campaign in states with upcoming primaries, such as South Dakota and Florida. The South Dakota primary, the next one after New Hampshire's, was considered very important to both Harkin and Kerrey's campaigns, as they were the only candidates from the Midwestern United States, and a poor showing in that state could seriously damage their chances of securing the nomination. Ultimately, on February 25, Harkin finished second to Kerrey. On March 3, Harkin won the Idaho and Minnesota caucuses, but had yet to win a primary and was falling farther behind Clinton and Tsongas, who had had strong showings in other primaries.

=== Withdrawal ===
On March 9, the day before Super Tuesday, a staff member in Harkin's campaign told the Associated Press that Harkin would be announcing his withdrawal from the race later that day. Harkin officially announced his withdrawal in a news conference in Washington, D.C., making him the second Democratic candidate to drop out of the race following Kerrey's withdrawal several days earlier. While Harkin declined to support a particular candidate at the time, he pledged to support the eventual Democratic nominee and vowed to continue to push for a more progressive agenda in government. Paraphrasing John F. Kennedy's inaugural address while humorously alluding to the remaining contenders, he said, "I will pay any price, bear any burden, learn to speak Greek, develop a Southern accent, or learn to wear a turtleneck to ensure that a Democrat is elected president in 1992". This final campaign announcement before he returned to his native Iowa was attended primarily by students from Gallaudet University, a private university catering to the deaf and hard of hearing. According to some political analysts, Harkin's poor showing in the primaries he competed in was due primarily to internal organization issues and the assumption that either Clinton or Tsongas would be the eventual nominees. However, his campaign manager stated that the decision was due to a lack of funding. Because he had not received at least 10 percent of the vote in two consecutive primaries, Harkin's campaign risked losing federal matching funds.

== Aftermath ==
Following his withdrawal, Harkin eventually supported Clinton for the nomination and campaigned for him throughout the remainder of the Democratic primaries, with The New York Times calling Harkin "the most supportive of Gov. Bill Clinton's original competitors for the Democratic Presidential nomination". Harkin's campaigning was considered influential in helping Clinton to win support from labor leaders in New York and Pennsylvania, and Clinton ultimately defeated all other candidates to secure the Democratic nomination. Despite Harkin's support, he was never seriously considered to be Clinton's running mate, though he was allowed to give a speech at that year's Democratic National Convention. Going into the general election, Harkin continued to campaign for Clinton, which included speaking to members of organized labor. Clinton went on to defeat Bush and become president. Harkin continued to serve in the Senate until his retirement in 2015.
