= Caroline Killeen =

American activist and politician (1926–2014)

Caroline Pettinato Killeen
- Born: January 15, 1926; Scranton, Pennsylvania, U.S.
- Died: December 2014 (aged 88); Italy
- Occupations: United States activist, perennial political candidate, nature lobbyist
- Known for: running in the United States presidential race on a pro-marijuana platform

Caroline M. Pettinato Killeen (January 15, 1926 – December 2014) was an American activist, perennial political candidate, and self-proclaimed nature lobbyist. She ran as a United States presidential candidate at least five times between 1976 and 2008, and officially qualified for the ballot in the New Hampshire primary in 2008 as a Democrat She ran for Mayor of Tucson in 1983, receiving 31 votes.

== Early life ==
Killeen was born in Scranton, Pennsylvania, and adopted by Peter (or Pietro) Pettinato and Antoinette Pettinato. Both of her parents were born in Italy; Pietro Pettinato ran a grocery store. She was briefly removed from the Pettinato home in 1934, when police found evidence of abuse. She sold the Pettinato home in Scranton in 1954, for $10,000.

== Career ==
Killeen moved to New Mexico in the 1950s, intending to enter a convent. She did not take final vows to become a nun, though she was sometimes later described as a "former nun". She earned a meager living in Tucson and Florida as an agricultural worker, waitress, a cashier, and a careworker. She also redeemed recycling and sold seeds and stickers to raise money. She biked across the U.S. several times to raise awareness of environmental and anti-nuclear issues. "When you bicycle, you have time to philosophize," she told an interviewer in 1970. "Our country needs philosophy, it needs more concern about the individual as a whole, not just as a commodity. We have so many machines we begin to act like them." She rode from Scranton to Florida in 1965, from Tucson to Detroit in 1970, and from Florida up the East Coast in 1973.

In 1976, Killeen rode across the country on her first campaign as a write-in candidate for president. "I had this psychic insight that the country is ready for a woman president," she explained. "It's the Bicentennial year. People are hoping something revolutionary will happen." She ran for president in 1984, but also rode to Canada that year, seeking political asylum. In 1987, at the age of 61, she rode a bicycle across America to protest against the arms race between the Soviet Union and United States. She ran as "the Hemp Lady", advocating marijuana legalization. Her run for president in 1992 earned her an extended mention in an Australian newspaper article titled "Hopeless Candidates". In 1996, she ran for president again, riding across the country at age 70, again speaking about the value of hemp as a crop. She was named "Freedom Fighter of the Month" by High Times magazine in June 1996.

== Personal life ==
Killeen married Douglas Keffer in Texas in 1979. She moved to Italy by 2007, and began calling herself "Caroline of Assisi". She died in Italy in 2014, in her eighties.
