= 1992 New Hampshire Democratic presidential primary =

1992 Democratic presidential primary election in New Hampshire

- February 18, 1992
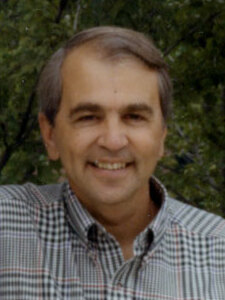

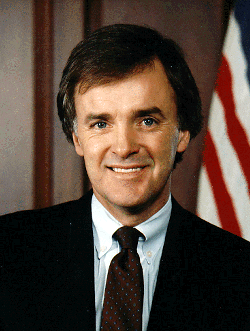

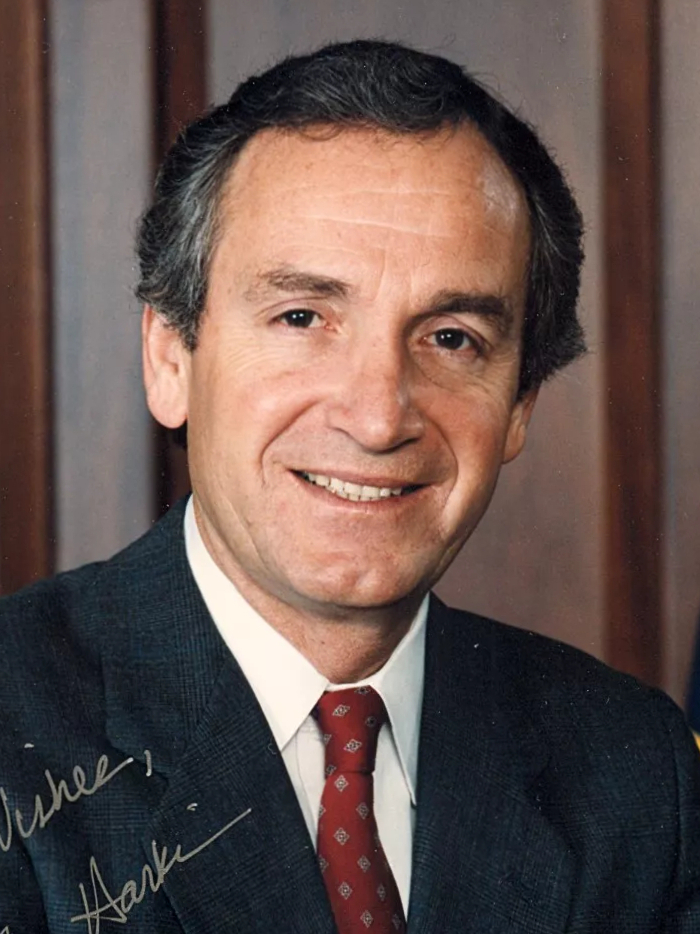

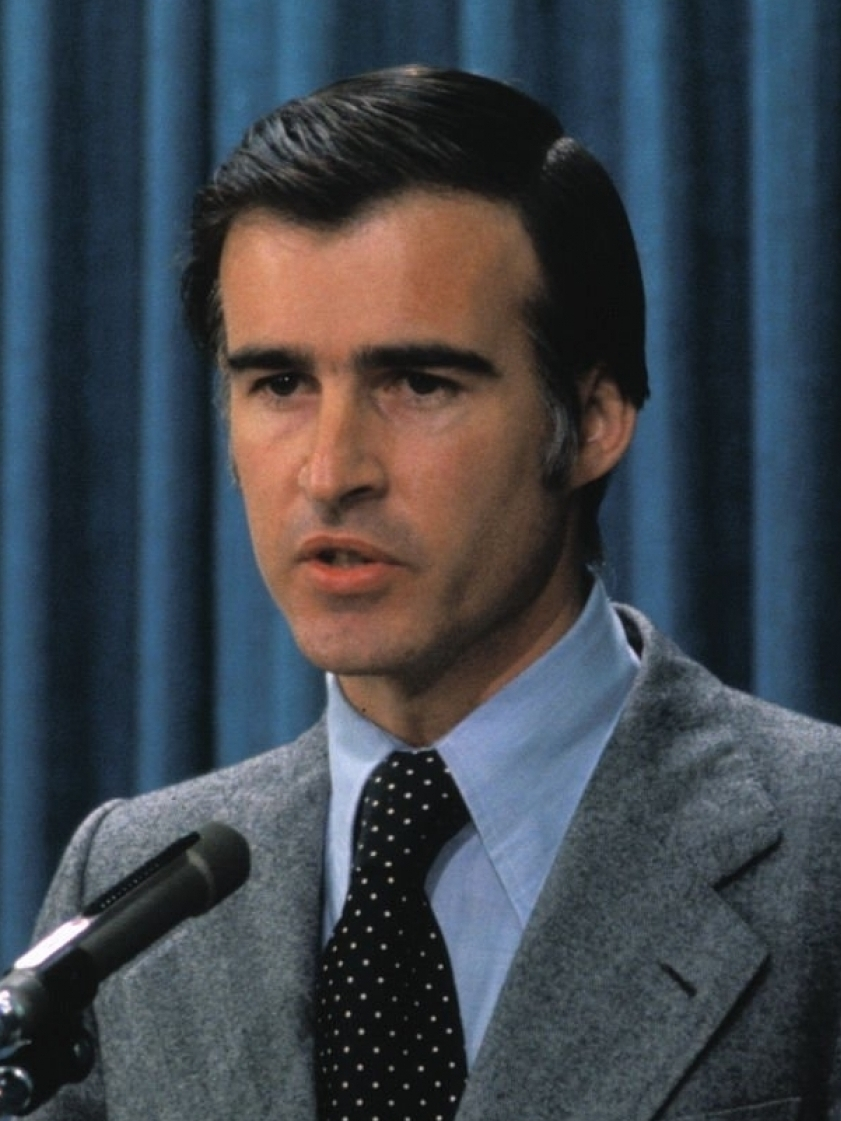
Candidate	Paul Tsongas	Bill Clinton	Bob Kerrey
Home state	Massachusetts	Arkansas	Nebraska
Delegate count	9	9	0
Popular vote	55,666	41,542	18,584
Percentage	33.21%	24.78%	11.09%
Candidate	Tom Harkin	Jerry Brown
Home state	Iowa	California
Delegate count	0	0
Popular vote	17,063	13,660
Percentage	10.18%	8.15%
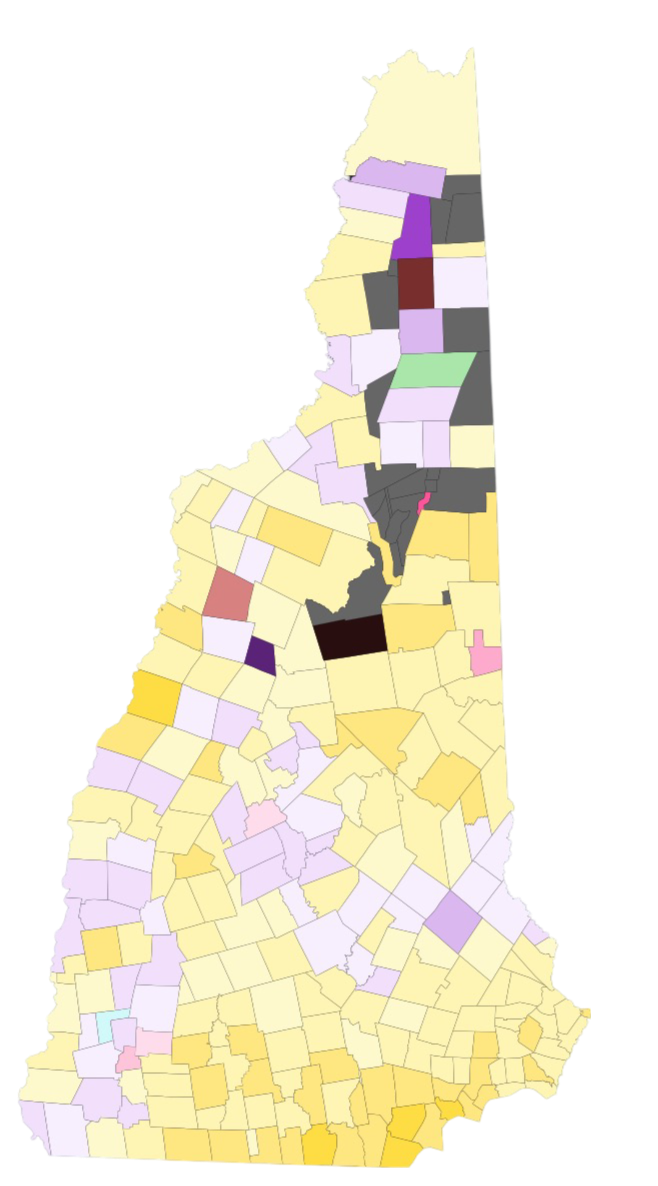
- Tsongas: 20-30% 30-40% 40-50% 50-60% Clinton: 20-30% 30-40% 40-50% 70-80% 100% Harkin: 20-30% Brown: 20-30% 30-40% 40-50% 60-70% Cuomo: 30-40% 70-80% 100% Nader: 20-30%

The 1992 New Hampshire Democratic presidential primary was held on February 18, in New Hampshire as one of the Democratic Party's statewide nomination contests ahead of the 1992 United States presidential election. The primary was won by former Massachusetts Senator Paul Tsongas, but became historically significant for the surprising second-place finish of Arkansas Governor Bill Clinton, who would go on to win both the Democratic nomination and the presidency.

== Background ==
The 1992 presidential election cycle began during a period of economic uncertainty, with the United States experiencing a recession that had started in 1990. President George H. W. Bush's approval ratings had fallen dramatically from their post-Gulf War highs, creating an opportunity for Democratic challengers. Several high-profile Democrats, including New York Governor Mario Cuomo and Jesse Jackson, opted not to run, leaving a relatively open field.

The traditional importance of the New Hampshire primary was heightened in 1992 because the Iowa caucuses, typically the first major contest of the primary season, were effectively bypassed by most candidates due to the presence of Iowa Senator Tom Harkin in the race. This made New Hampshire the first meaningful test of candidate strength in the 1992 nomination process.

== Campaign ==
=== Early developments ===
The primary campaign in New Hampshire was marked by intense retail politics, with candidates participating in numerous town halls, house parties, and local events across the state. Paul Tsongas, from neighboring Massachusetts, initially held an advantage due to regional familiarity and his message of economic revitalization focused on manufacturing and investment.

On January 19, The Boston Globe published a poll showing Clinton leading with 29%, Tsongas at 17%, and Bob Kerrey at 16%. However, this lead would prove short-lived as Clinton's campaign faced multiple crises in the following weeks.

=== Clinton campaign challenges ===
The Clinton campaign weathered several major controversies during the New Hampshire primary period. In late January, tabloid reports emerged alleging a twelve-year extramarital affair between Clinton and Gennifer Flowers. Clinton's poll numbers plummeted in the aftermath of these allegations. The scandal was compounded by intensifying questions about Clinton's actions during the Vietnam War and his efforts to avoid the draft, including scrutiny of a letter he had written to the ROTC program.

During this period, Clinton also faced controversy over his decision to return to Arkansas during the campaign to oversee the execution of Ricky Ray Rector, a mentally impaired death row inmate. The execution drew both praise from law-and-order voters and criticism from death penalty opponents, adding another layer of complexity to Clinton's campaign narrative.

In response to these mounting challenges, Bill and Hillary Clinton appeared on 60 Minutes immediately following Super Bowl XXVI to address the Flowers allegations. This interview became a crucial moment in salvaging Clinton's campaign, particularly when Hillary Clinton memorably declared she was not "some little woman standing by my man like Tammy Wynette." The couple's joint appearance helped stabilize the campaign and began to shift media narrative away from the scandal.

=== Final stretch ===
The last weeks of the campaign saw Tsongas maintaining a steady lead in polls, while Clinton focused on economic messages and personal connections with voters. His campaign emphasized his background and understanding of working-class struggles, contrasting with Tsongas's more technocratic approach. Clinton's personal campaigning style, characterized by long hours of direct voter contact and emotional connections with constituents, proved particularly effective in the state's retail political environment.

== Results ==
=== Final outcome ===
Tsongas won the primary with 33.21% of the vote, while Clinton secured a strong second place with 24.78%. Bob Kerrey finished third with 11.09%, followed by Tom Harkin at 10.18% and Jerry Brown with 8.15%. The results were particularly impressive for Clinton given earlier polls showing him significantly behind.

=== Detailed results ===
- Paul Tsongas: 55,666 (33.21%)
- Bill Clinton: 41,542 (24.78%)
- Bob Kerrey: 18,584 (11.09%)
- Tom Harkin: 17,063 (10.18%)
- Jerry Brown: 13,660 (8.15%)
- Mario Cuomo: 6,577 (3.92%)
- Tom Laughlin: 3,251 (1.94%)
- Ralph Nader: 3,054 (1.82%)
- Charles Woods: 2,862 (1.71%)
- George Herbert Walker Bush: 1,433 (0.86%)
- Pat Buchanan: 1,248 (0.74%)
- Lenora Fulani: 402 (0.24%)
- Larry Agran: 331 (0.20%)
- Patrick J. Mahoney, Jr.: 303 (0.18%)
- Eugene McCarthy: 211 (0.13%)
- John Donald Rigazio: 186 (0.11%)
- Curly Thornton: 125 (0.08%)
- Lyndon LaRouche: 115 (0.07%)
- Douglas Wilder: 103 (0.06%)
- Caroline Killeen: 94 (0.06%)
- John Patrick Cahill: 83 (0.05%)
- Paul C. Fisher: 82 (0.05%)
- Andre Marrou: 67 (0.04%)
- Frank Bona: 65 (0.04%)
- Karl J. Hegger: 61 (0.04%)

Source: Our Campaigns

=== Analysis and impact ===
Clinton's second-place finish, despite the recent scandals and low poll numbers, earned him the nickname "The Comeback Kid" and provided crucial momentum for his campaign. The media narrative shifted from focusing on his personal controversies to his resilience and political skills.

The outcome was shaped by several key factors. Tsongas benefited from his position as a former Massachusetts senator, giving him natural advantages in name recognition and media coverage. Clinton's effective retail campaigning and emotional connection with voters helped him overcome the recent scandals. The economic message of both leading candidates resonated strongly with New Hampshire residents during the recession, though they offered contrasting solutions.

== Historical significance ==
The 1992 New Hampshire primary proved historically significant in transforming the nature of modern presidential campaigns. It established Clinton's reputation for political resilience and demonstrated the possibility of surviving major scandals in modern media-driven campaigns. Notably, it marked the first time a candidate would go on to win the presidency despite not winning the New Hampshire primary as a non-incumbent.

Clinton's performance in New Hampshire set a precedent for future presidential candidates. In subsequent elections, George W. Bush, Barack Obama, and Joe Biden would also win the presidency despite losing the New Hampshire primary as non-incumbents, suggesting a shift in the primary's traditional role as a kingmaker in presidential politics.
