= Socialist Party of Colorado =

- Ideology: Democratic socialism Socialist feminism Multi-tendency
- Political position: Left-wing
- National affiliation: Socialist Party USA
- Colors: Red

Website
- SP of Colorado

The Socialist Party of Colorado was an affiliate of the Socialist Party of America, lasting from the first decade of the twentieth century to at least the 1950s. Later there was a Socialist Party of Colorado affiliated with the Socialist Party USA. The Socialist Party of Colorado engages in both electoral politics and non-electoral activism.

== Election results ==
=== Presidential nominee results ===
Since 1976, the Socialist Party USA has run a candidate for President of the United States. The party's nominee has been on the ballot in Colorado in each election since 1996. The candidate who has received the highest vote total in Colorado was peace activist David McReynolds in 2000.

Year	Nominee	Votes	Place
1976	Frank Zeidler	None counted	
1980	David McReynolds	None counted	
1984	Sonia Johnson	None counted	
1988	Willa Kenoyer	None counted	
1992	J. Quinn Brisben	None counted	
1996	Mary Cal Hollis	669 (.04%)	9th of 13
2000	David McReynolds	712 (0.01%)	8th of 10
2004	Walt Brown	216 (0.01%)	11th of 12
2008	Brian Moore	226 (0.01%)	12th of 16
2012	Stewart Alexander	308 (.01%)	11th of 14
2016	Mimi Soltysik	271 (.01)	21st of 22

== Publications ==
- State Constitution of the Socialist Party of Colorado, Adopted by Referendum Vote in September, 1909; In Effect from Nov. 1, 1909, 2018, Creative Media Partners. ISBN 978-1-376-69012-5
