= Socialist Party of New Jersey =

- Chair: Pat Noble
- Vice Chair: Greg Pason
- Founded: 1970s
- Ideology: Democratic socialism Socialist feminism Multi-tendency
- Political position: Left-wing
- National affiliation: Socialist Party USA
- Colors: Red

Website
- njsocialistparty.org

The Socialist Party of New Jersey (SPNJ) is the state chapter of the Socialist Party USA in the U.S. state of New Jersey.

The Socialist Party of New Jersey engages in both electoral politics and non-electoral activism. Some examples of non-electoral activism includes anti-racist actions in cooperation with Residents Against Racism, support for unions and unionization in cooperation with the Industrial Workers of the World (IWW) and other unions, anti-war and anti-imperialist agitation, and support for feminism and women's rights.

In 2014, the SPNJ declared victory in a lawsuit (Noble v. State) against the State of New Jersey over the State preventing the Party from having voter registration rights. The SPNJ joins eight other political parties who have voter registration, six of which are minor/alternative parties and also had to file a lawsuit to receive voter registration abilities.

The Socialist Party of New Jersey has two active locals, a Northern New Jersey local headquartered in Montclair, and a Central New Jersey local headquartered in Red Bank.

== Organization ==
The Socialist Party of New Jersey is governed by a State Executive Committee (SEC), elected to two-year terms at a state convention on odd years. The state convention elects one to two State Chairs, as well as a State Secretary and State Treasurer. Additionally, each chartered local is invited to elect one representative to sit on the SEC as a voting member.

== Former candidates ==
=== Gubernatorial candidates ===
- 2013: Maynor Moreno/Stephanie Gussin- Write-in candidacy (votes not counted)
- 2009: Greg Pason/Costantino Rozzo- 2,085 votes (0.09%)
- 2005: Costantino Rozzo- 2,078 votes (0.09%)
- 2001: Costantino Rozzo- 1,537 votes (0.07%)
- 1997: Greg Pason- 2,800 votes (0.12%)

=== US Senate candidates ===
- 2012: Greg Pason- 2,249 votes (0.07%)
- 2006: Greg Pason- 2,490 votes (0.11%)
- 2002: Greg Pason- 2,702 votes (0.13%)
- 2000: Greg Pason- 3,365 votes (0.11%)

=== US House of Representatives candidates ===
- 2008, District 2: Constantio Rozzo- 648 votes (0.23%)
- 2006, District 2: Willie Norwood- 385 votes (0.21%)
- 2004, District 2: Constantio Rozzo- 595 votes (0.22%)
- 2004, District 5: Greg Pason- 574 votes (0.19%)
- 2002, District 2: Constantio Rozzo- 771 votes (0.46%)
- 2000, District 2: Constantio Rozzo- 788 votes (0.34%)
- 1994, District 9: Greg Pason- 1,490 votes (0.93%) (on ballot as "Independent")
- 1984, District 3: Lawrence D. Erickson- 907 votes (0.40%)
- 1982, District 3: Lawrence D. Erickson- 436 votes (0.26%)
- 1980, District 3: Lawrence D. Erickson- 643 votes (0.30%)

=== State Assembly candidates ===
- 2005, District 2: Sharin Chiorazzo- 832 votes (0.77%) and Willie Norwood- 665 (0.61%) (two candidates elected)
- 2005, District 10: Scott Baier- 584 votes (0.46%) (two candidates elected)
- 2003, District 1: Constantino Rozzo- 768 votes (0.81%) (two candidates elected)
- 1997, District 27: John-Martin Winter- 1,051 votes (1.50%) (two candidates elected)
- 1995, District 27: John-Martin Winter- 478 votes (1.07%) (two candidates elected)

=== County/local candidates ===
- 2018 Red Bank Regional High School Board of Education: Pat Noble- 2,539 votes (98.60%) (non-partisan race)
- 2015 Red Bank Regional High School Board of Education: Pat Noble- 1,103 votes (97.78%) (non-partisan race)
- 2012 Red Bank Regional High School Board of Education: Pat Noble- 1,187 votes (54.47%) (non-partisan race)
- 2011 Monmouth County Board of Chosen Freeholders: Pat Noble- 1,389 votes (0.67%)
- 2008 Madison Borough Council: Peter Moody- Write-in candidacy (votes not counted)
- 2006 Mayor of Paterson: Tommy Silva- 205 votes (1.12%) (non-partisan race)

=== Presidential nominee results ===
Since 1976, the Socialist Party USA has run a candidate for President of the United States. The party's nominee has been on the ballot in New Jersey in 1976, 1980, 1984, 1988, 2000, 2004 and 2008. The candidate who has received the highest vote total in New Jersey was Willa Kenoyer in 1988.

Year	Nominee	Result	Votes	Notes
1900	Eugene V. Debs	4 of 6	4,611 (1.15%)	
1904	Eugene V. Debs	3 of 6	9,587 (2.22%)	
1908	Eugene V. Debs	3 of 6	10,249 (2.19%)	
1912	Eugene V. Debs	4 of 6	15,948 (3.69%)	
1916	Allan L. Benson	3 of 5	10,405 (2.10%)	
1920	Eugene V. Debs	3 of 7	27,141 (3.00%)	
1924	Robert M. La Follette	3 of 8	108,901 (10.03%)	Also nominated by the Progressive Party.
1928	Norman Thomas	3 of 6	4,897 (0.32%)	
1932	Norman Thomas	3 of 6	42,998 (2.64%)	
1936	Norman Thomas	4 of 7	3,931 (0.22%)	
1940	Norman Thomas	4 of 6	2,433 (0.12%)	
1944	Norman Thomas	5 of 5	3,558 (0.17%)	
1948	Norman Thomas	5 of 7	10,521 (0.54%)	
1952	Darlington Hoopes	3 of 8	8,592 (0.36%)	
1956	Darlington Hoopes	N/A	N/A	Not on ballot; final presidential campaign of Socialist Party of America
1976	Frank Zeidler	12 of 12	469 (0.02%)	First nominee of Socialist Party USA
1980	David McReynolds	10 of 13	1,973 (0.07%)	
1984	Sonia Johnson	9 of 9	1,247 (0.02%)	Also nominated by the Citizens Party.
1988	Willa Kenoyer	7 of 11	2,587 (0.08%)	
1992	J. Quinn Brisben	N/A	N/A	(not on ballot)
1996	Mary Cal Hollis	N/A	N/A	(not on ballot)
2000	David McReynolds	7 of 9	1,880 (0.06%)	
2004	Walt Brown	7 of 9	664 (0.02%)	
2008	Brian Moore	7 of 10	699 (0.02%)	
2012	Stewart Alexander	N/A	N/A	(not on ballot)
2016	Mimi Soltysik	N/A	N/A	(not on ballot)
2020	Howie Hawkins	4 of 8	14,202 (0.31%)	Also nominated by the Green Party.
