= Ron Ehrenreich =

American politician

Ron Ehrenreich (born 1950) is an American credit union officer and teacher. He was the vice-presidential candidate for the Socialist Party USA in the 1988 United States presidential election, as the running mate of Willa Kenoyer. The ticket received 3,882 votes, 2,587 of the votes came from New Jersey. He has been the treasurer of the Syracuse Cooperative Federal Credit Union since its opening in 1982. He later ran as a Green Party candidate for Onondaga County, New York Comptroller in 1999. Ron is married to Sondra Roth, and has two children.

Party political offices
Preceded by Diane Drufenbrock	Socialist Party vice presidential candidate 1988 (lost)	Succeeded by Barbara Garson
