= Mary Alice Herbert =

American politician (1935–2021)

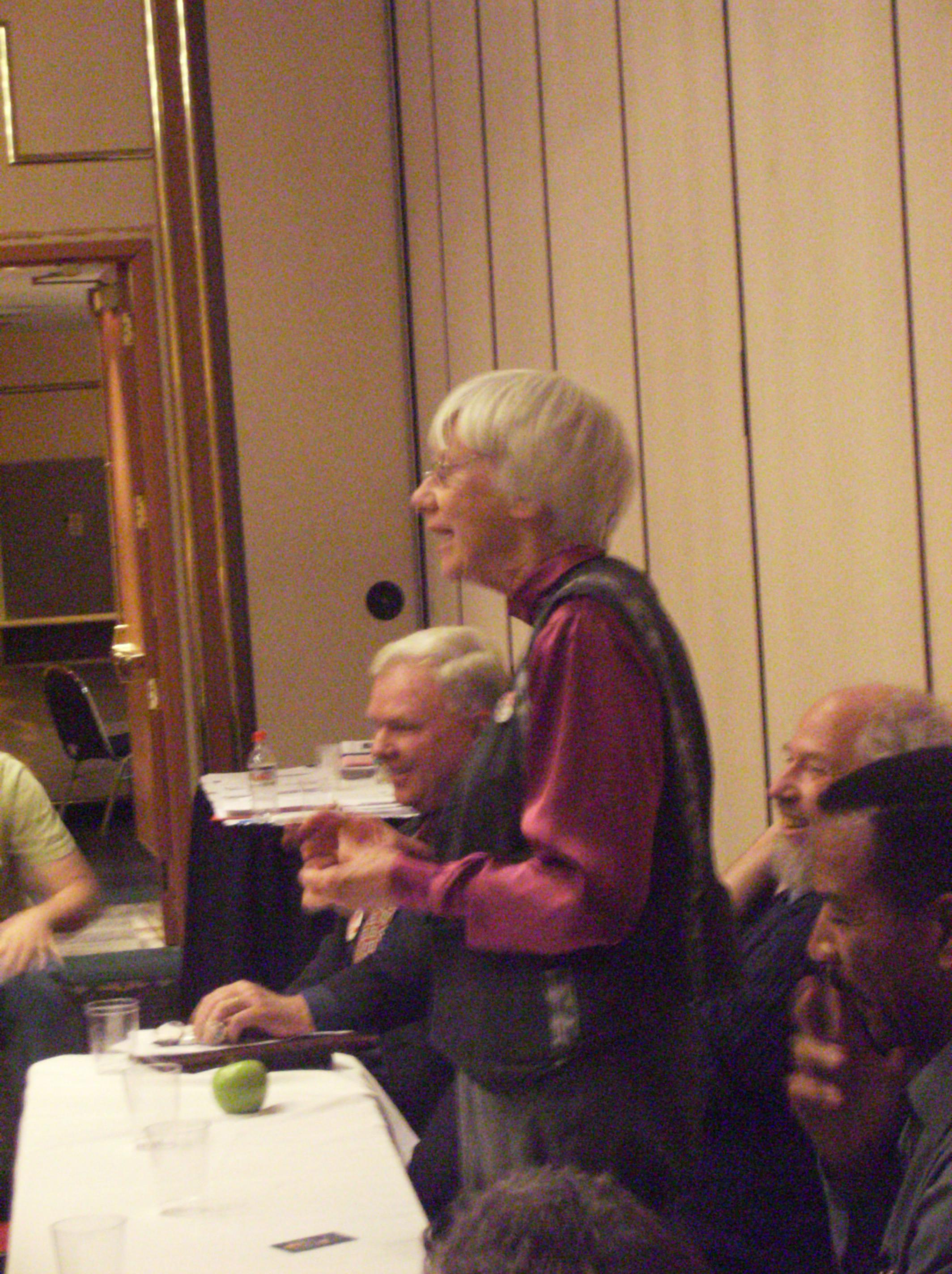
Mal Herbert speaking to delegates of the Socialist Party USA National Convention during the "Meet the Candidates" forum, October 19, 2007

Mary Alice "Mal" Herbert (February 28, 1935 – May 13, 2021) was an American schoolteacher and politician from Vermont who ran for vice president as the candidate for the Socialist Party USA in 2004; and ran for many offices in her home state. She and her running-mate, Walt Brown, pulled in 10,837 votes, the highest total for the Socialist Party since 1952.

She was married to her husband Fred Herbert until his death in October 2002.

Herbert died on May 13, 2021, at the age of 86.

== Political career ==
Originally a Republican, she became a socialist by the 1960s. Herbert was a frequent candidate for state office in the 1980s and 1990s under the banner of the Liberty Union Party, a nonviolent socialist party active only in the state of Vermont. In 1996 she was the Liberty Union nominee for Governor of Vermont.

She originally entered the 2004 race as the running mate of Eric Chester, one of Brown's leftist rivals for the presidential nomination. Chester lost the nomination to Brown, but Herbert won the VP nomination at the SP national convention. She ran on a platform on democratic socialism and socialist feminism. A recall effort within the party attempted to have Herbert become the SP's presidential candidate, after a major rift arose over Brown's position on abortion. Despite all of the challenges surrounding the campaign, the Brown-Herbert ticket went on to earn more votes than any Socialist Party presidential ticket since 1952.

In 2006, Herbert was the Liberty Union Party nominee for Lieutenant Governor of Vermont.

In 2007, she ran for the vice presidential nomination of the Socialist Party for the 2008 ticket. However, her candidacy was conditional upon Eric Chester winning the presidential nomination. Chester narrowly lost the presidential nomination to Brian P. Moore.

In 2012, Herbert was the Liberty Union candidate in the election for Vermont Secretary of State against Democratic, Progressive, Working Families and Republican nominee Jim Condos, she garnered 13.1% of the vote, returning the LUP to major party status in Vermont once again.

Party political offices
Preceded by Mary Cal Hollis	Socialist Party vice presidential candidate 2004 (lost)	Succeeded by Stewart Alexander
