= Carl Zeidler =

American politician (1908–1942)

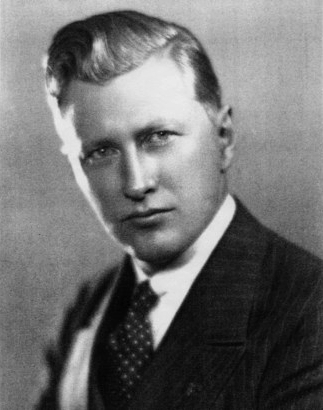
- Zeidler c. 1940

39th Mayor of Milwaukee
- In office April 15, 1940 – April 8, 1942
- Preceded by: Daniel Hoan
- Succeeded by: John Bohn

Personal details
- Born: Carl Frederick Zeidler; January 4, 1908 Milwaukee, Wisconsin, U.S.
- Died: December 11, 1942 (aged 34) Indian Ocean, off South Africa
- Cause of death: Killed in action
- Party: Democratic
- Relatives: Frank Zeidler (brother)
- Profession: Attorney; politician

Military service
- Branch/service: United States Navy
- Years of service: 1942
- Unit: United States Navy Reserve
- Battles/wars: World War II †

Carl Frederick Zeidler (January 4, 1908 – December 11, 1942) was an American politician and the mayor of the city of Milwaukee, Wisconsin, from 1940 to 1942, winning election by unseating six-term Socialist mayor Daniel Hoan. After just two years in office Zeidler resigned his position as mayor to enlist in the United States Navy Reserve to fight in World War II. His merchant marine ship and all hands died off the coast of South Africa in December 1942 after being hit by a German U-boat U-159 torpedo attack.

== Biography ==
=== Early years ===
Zeidler was born January 4, 1908, in Milwaukee, Wisconsin to parents of German ancestry. He graduated from Marquette University in 1929 and received a J.D. in 1931 from its law school.

=== Political career ===
Pinback button from Zeidler's 1940 campaign

Serving as an assistant city attorney for Milwaukee (1936–1940), Zeidler stunned the city when he upset six-term Socialist mayor Daniel Hoan to become mayor of Milwaukee in 1940. Hoan had served as mayor for the past 24 years.

His rise to power was orchestrated by young writers Robert Bloch (later the author of Psycho) and Harold Gauer, who created elaborate campaign shows. In Bloch's autobiography, Once Around the Bloch, he gives an inside account of the campaign, and the innovations he and Gauer came up with, such as the original "releasing-balloons-from-the-ceiling" schtick. He comments bitterly on how, after Zeidler's election, they were ignored and not even paid their promised salaries, while credit was taken by local establishment figures like Milton Rice Polland instead.

Bloch ends the account with a philosophical point:

If Carl Zeidler had not asked Jim Doolittle to manage his campaign, Doolittle would never have contacted me about it. And the only reason Doolittle knew me to begin with was because he read my yarn ("The Cloak") in Unknown. Rattling this chain of circumstances, one may stretch it a bit further. If I had not written a little vampire story called "The Cloak", Carl Zeidler might never have become mayor of Milwaukee.

=== Death and legacy ===
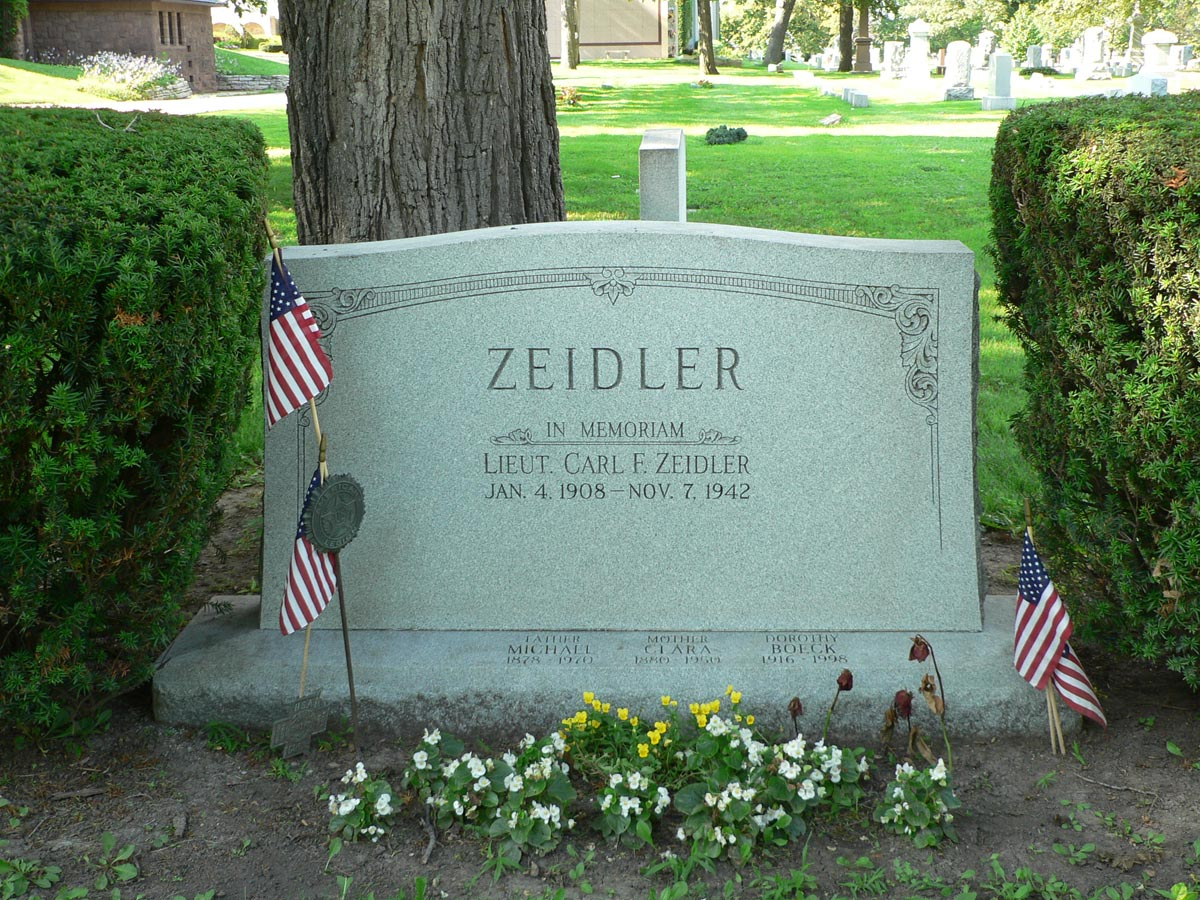
Gravesite cenotaph in Forest Home Cemetery

Zeidler's election was attracting attention on the national political scene as World War II broke out. After a year in office, Zeidler came to believe he could best help the war effort by enlisting; he resigned his position as mayor and accepted a Naval Reserve commission on April 8, 1942. He asked for the most dangerous job on ship and became officer in charge of a gun battery on board the merchant ship SS La Salle.

The ship and all hands were reported missing off the coast of South Africa on November 7, 1942, sunk by a German U-boat U-159 torpedo attack. Zeidler was officially presumed dead December 11, 1944. A gravestone cenotaph marks his plot at Forest Home Cemetery in Milwaukee.

Carl's brother, socialist Frank P. Zeidler, later became mayor of Milwaukee and served in that position from 1948 to 1960. Carl's mayoral papers are archived at Milwaukee Public Library.

== See also ==
- List of mayors of Milwaukee

Political offices
Preceded by Daniel Webster Hoan	Mayor of Milwaukee; 1940–1942	Succeeded by John Bohn
