= Eric Chester =

American writer and academic

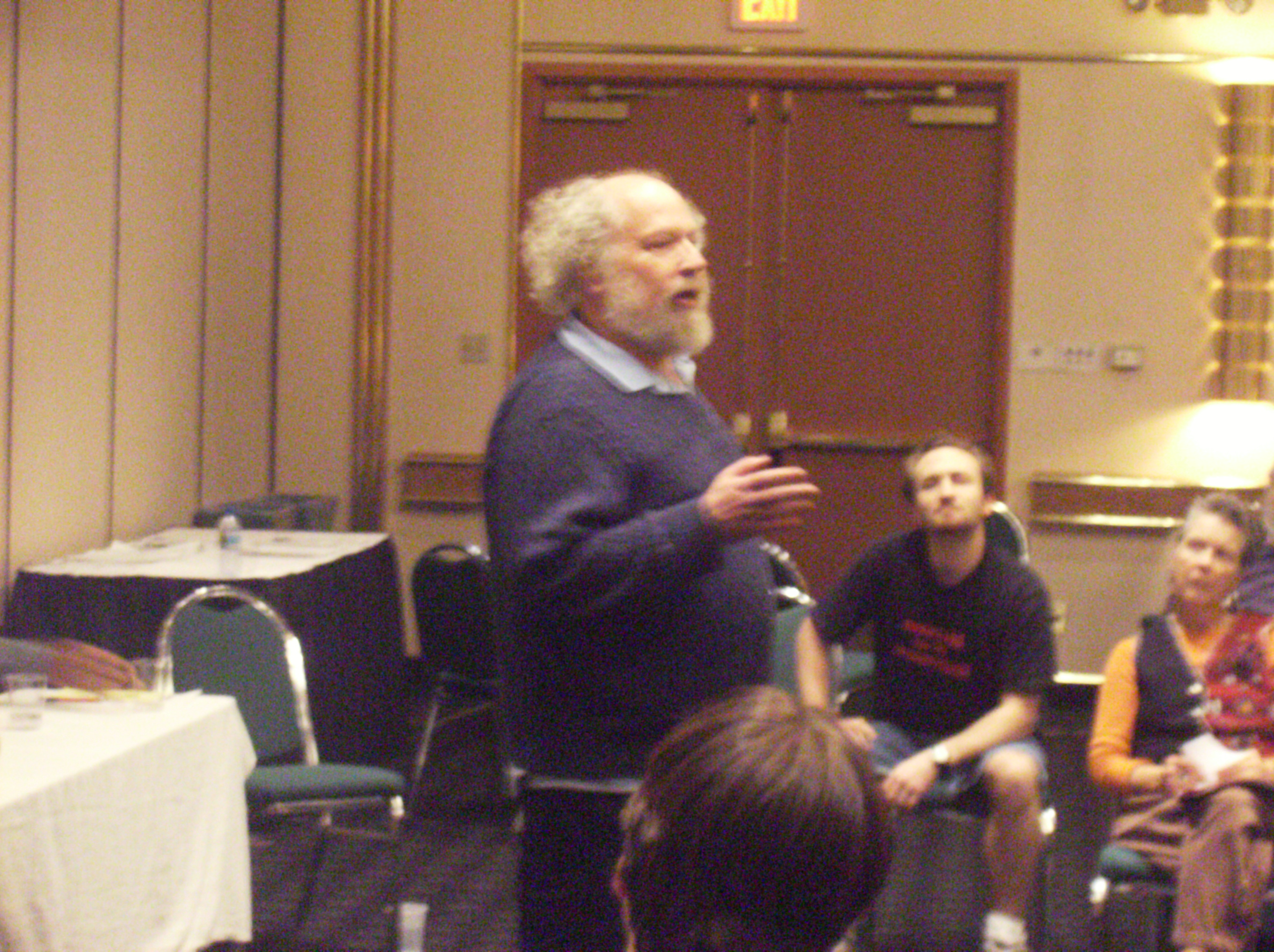
- Chester speaking to delegates at the Socialist Party USA National Convention in St. Louis, Missouri, October 19, 2007
- Born: Eric Thomas Chester; New York City, U.S.
- Education: University of Michigan (BA, PhD)
- Occupations: Author; political activist
- Political party: Socialist Party USA
- Parent(s): Harry Chester; Alice Fried

Eric Thomas Chester is an American author, socialist political activist, and former economics professor.

== Early life ==
Born in New York City, he is the son of Harry (an economist on the research staff of the United Auto Workers) and Alice (a psychiatrist né Fried) Chester. His parents were socialist activists from Vienna. They were forced to flee Austria after the Nazis invaded in February 1938, both because of their political activities and because they were Jewish.

Since the UAW is based in Detroit, Michigan, Chester spent much of his youth in the Detroit area.

== Student activist ==
In October 1965 he was arrested in Ann Arbor, Michigan, in the first draft board sit-in as part of one of the first acts of civil disobedience against the American government's warfare against the people of Vietnam. He served 15 days in the Washtenaw County Jail. He was one of several students who were reclassified for immediate induction into the army because of their participation in the sit-in. A landmark decision by the U. S. 2nd Circuit Court ruled that the draft could not be used to punish protestors.

Chester helped to form the Radical Independent Party in Ann Arbor in 1970. RIP elected two members to the Ann Arbor City Council in April 1972. It later merged into the Michigan Human Rights Party.

== Career and later activism ==
Chester moved to Boston, Massachusetts, in 1973. He taught economics at the University of Massachusetts-Boston from 1973 to 1978, where he helped to organize the faculty-staff union, an affiliate of the National Education Association. He was also active in the New American Movement during this period.

In 1978, Chester moved to Berkeley, California. He taught as an adjunct for a semester at San Francisco State University. He worked as a cab driver in San Francisco, where he became involved in protests by drivers opposed to a substantial increase in the number of cabs on the street. The protests won a significant roll-back.

Chester joined the Socialist Party USA in 1980. He was the Socialist Party USA's candidate for vice president in 1996. He campaigned for the Socialist Party USA's presidential nomination for the 2000, 2004 and 2008 elections, but lost to David McReynolds, Walt Brown and Brian Moore respectively.

Chester moved to Washington's Olympic Peninsula in the fall of 2007. He was active in protests against the Border Patrol's decision to set up roadblocks along the only highway in the area.

== Scotland and beyond ==
Chester moved to Glasgow, Scotland, UK, in the fall of 2009 and stayed until the summer of 2021. He was actively involved in the Scottish Peace Network. He took part in protests against an arms fair being held in a venue controlled by Glasgow City Council. Following the protests, the city council decided that it would carefully consider whether to permit future arms fairs in their venues.

== Publications and research ==
In his research, Chester seeks "to probe beneath the surface", while keeping in mind that "the goals and actions of decision makers, as well as their envoys, are frequently in marked contrast to their public statements." His work relies heavily on primary archival sources.

He has published seven books. Two of the first four, Covert Network and The U. S. Intervention in the Dominican Republic, looked at "the connections between U.S. foreign policy and social democrats.” during the Cold War.

The remaining two books of the first four, Socialists and the Ballot Box and True Mission, looked into U. S. socialist history. A specific focus was the need for a socialist politics entirely independent of the two mainstream parties.

The last three books arose out of a single research project, examining the suppression of dissent during the First World War. The books are The Wobblies in Their Heyday, Yours for Industrial Freedom, an IWW anthology, and Free Speech. A final forthcoming book in this series will focus on the repression of progressives during this same period.

Party political offices
Preceded by Barbara Garson	Socialist Party vice presidential candidate 1996 (lost)	Succeeded by Mary Cal Hollis

== Books ==
- Free Speech and the Suppression of Dissent During World War I, ISBN 978-1583678688, Monthly Review Press, 2020.
- Yours for Industrial Freedom, ISBN 978-1945473234, Levellers Press, 2018.
- The wobblies in their heyday : the rise and destruction of the industrial workers of the world during the World War I era, paperback ed., ISBN 978-1937146955, Levellers Press, 2016.
- True Mission: Socialists and the Labor Party Question in the U.S., ISBN 978-074532-215-5, Pluto Press, 2004.
- Rag-Tags, Scum, Riff-Raff and Commies: The U.S. Intervention in the Dominican Republic, 1965–1966, ISBN 1-58367-032-7, New York University Press, 2001.
- Covert Network: Progressives, the International Rescue Committee, and the CIA, ISBN 1-56324-551-5, M. E. Sharpe, 1995.
- Socialists and the Ballot Box, ISBN 0-03-004142-2, Praeger Publishers, 1985.

== Articles ==
- The Lure of the Labor Party, May 1, 2022, The Socialist, https://www.socialistmag.org/
- Traitors, Spies and Military Tribunals: The Assault on Civil Liberties During World War I, Winter 2013 New Politics Vol. XIV No. 2, Whole Number 54)
- The Danish General Strike, Anarcho-Syndicalist Review, #25, Summer, 1999.
- Revolutionary socialism and the dictatorship of the proletariat, Critique, v17, n 1, 83–89, 1989.
- The Chilean Left, Resist Newsletter #189, Somerville, MA, Oct. 1986.
- The popular front and the UAW, Against the Current, vol 2, no 2 Spring 1985, p 48–54.
- Revolutionary Socialists and Independent Political Action, Against the Current, Winter 1982.
- Electoral systems and political parties, Insurgent Sociologist, Volume: 10, issue: 1, page(s): 27–31, July 1, 1980.
- Military spending and capitalist stability, Cambridge Journal of Economics, Volume 2, Issue 3, September 1978, Pages 293–298.
- History of the Ann Arbor Sit In, New Left Notes, Vol 1, no 2, January 28, 1966, p. 3. https://www.sds-1960s.org/NewLeftNotes-vol1-no02.pdf

== Interviews ==
- “What’s up, Comrades?” Red Library talks to Eric Chester about “Free Speech & the Suppression of Dissent During WWI” (1:48:11), Monthly Review, Oct 18, 2020. https://monthlyreview.org/whats-up-comrades-red-library-talks-to-eric-chester-about-free-speech-the-suppression-of-dissent-during-wwi/

== See also ==
- 2006 Massachusetts general election
- 2006 United States House of Representatives elections in Massachusetts
- 1996 United States presidential election
