= Diane Drufenbrock =

American Franciscan Sister, academic and politician (1929–2013)

Sister Diane Drufenbrock, S.S.S.F.
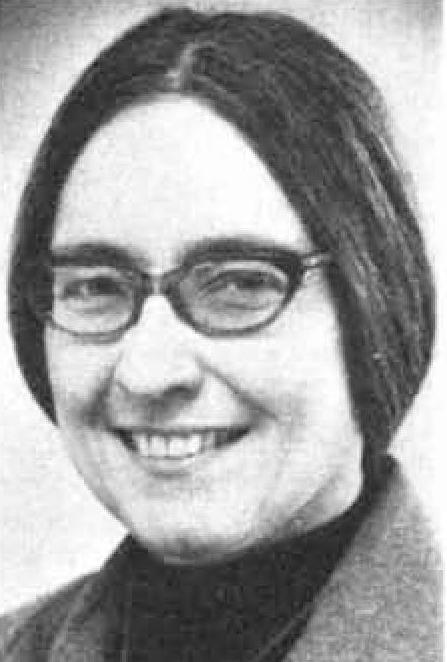
- Drufenbrock in 1980

Personal details
- Born: October 7, 1929 Evansville, Indiana, United States
- Died: November 4, 2013 (aged 84) Milwaukee, Wisconsin, United States
- Party: Socialist Party USA
- Education: Alverno College - Mathematics; Marquette University - Mathematics
- Alma mater: University of Illinois Urbana-Champaign - Doctor of Mathematics
- Occupation: Religious Sister and Professor

Diane Joyce Drufenbrock, S.S.S.F. (October 7, 1929 – November 4, 2013), also known as Sister Madeleine Sophie, was an American Religious Sister as a member of the Catholic School Sisters of St. Francis. She was a Christian socialist who was the vice-presidential candidate for the Socialist Party USA in the 1980 United States presidential election.

== Biography ==
Drufenbrock was born in Evansville, Indiana, the daughter of a plumber. In 1948, after graduating from Reitz Memorial High School, she moved to Milwaukee, Wisconsin, to enter the School Sisters of St. Francis, a religious congregation of Franciscan Sisters dedicated to education. She went on to earn various degrees in mathematics as a graduate of Alverno College in 1953 and of Marquette University. She then taught mathematics at Alverno College, at the University of Wisconsin–Parkside, and elsewhere around Milwaukee, including at the then-new St. Joseph High School (Kenosha) when it opened in September 1957. Drufenbrock gained a doctorate in mathematics from the University of Illinois at Urbana in 1963. After teaching for 13 years at Alverno College, she taught at Saint Mary-of-the-Woods College in her native Indiana for 18 years.

Dufenbrock started to work in community affairs while teaching at the school. She worked for the Milwaukee Tenant's Union and was a director of the Wisconsin branch of Project Equality to campaign for equal opportunities for women, disabled and ethnic minorities in work.

Her interest in social issues and changes within the Catholic Church led her to join the Socialist Party USA in 1976 after meeting Frank Zeidler. She ran as their vice-presidential candidate in the 1980 United States presidential election, and served as that party's National Treasurer from 1977. That campaign resulted in the Party's recognition by the Federal Election Commission as a national political party.

== Death ==
Drufenbrock died on November 4, 2013, in Milwaukee, Wisconsin.

Party political offices
Preceded by J. Quinn Brisben	Socialist Party vice presidential candidate 1980 (lost)	Succeeded by Ron Ehrenreich
