= Socialist Party USA =

Political party in the United States

Socialist Party of the United States of America
- Abbreviation: SPUSA
- Chairs: Matei Alexandru (NH); Mary Nickum (AZ)
- Vice Chairs: Ren Walstrom (IN); Stephanie Cholensky (MN)
- Secretary: Greg Pason
- Treasurer: William Cichy
- Editor: Mary Nickum
- Founded: May 30, 1973; 53 years ago
- Split from: Social Democrats, USA
- Preceded by: Socialist Party of America
- Headquarters: 168 Canal Street, 6th Floor New York City, New York 10013 (A. J. Muste Institute)
- Youth wing: Young People's Socialist League (1989-2010)
- Ideology: Democratic socialism; Radical democracy; Socialist feminism; Eco-socialism
- Political position: Left-wing
- Colors: Red
- Seats in the Senate: 0 / 100
- Seats in the House: 0 / 435
- Governorships: 0 / 50
- State Upper House Seats: 0 / 1,972
- State Lower House Seats: 0 / 5,411
- Local Offices: 3 (2026)

Website
- www.socialistpartyusa.net

The Socialist Party of the United States of America (also Socialist Party USA or SPUSA) is a socialist political party in the United States. SPUSA formed in 1973, one year after the Socialist Party of America splintered into three: Social Democrats, USA (legal successor); the Democratic Socialist Organizing Committee (split); and SPUSA.

SPUSA describes itself as a multi-tendency socialist party which hopes to win socialism through a "democratic revolution from below". In contrast to the Democratic Socialists of America (DSA), SPUSA advocates for "uncompromising independence" from the Democratic Party. SPUSA describes socialism as "radical democracy", in opposition to "capitalist and authoritarian statist systems".

Notable members include David McReynolds, Frank Zeidler, and Dan La Botz. Former members include Ben Burgis.

== Membership ==
In 1975, chairman Frank Zeidler claimed that SPUSA had around 500 members nationwide. SPUSA saw growth during the late 1970s and early to mid-1980s, expanding from around 600 members to around 1,700 members. In 2008, WMNF claimed that SPUSA had around 3,000 members. However, in 2010, CommonDreams wrote that SPUSA had only 1,000 members, and party members described that as an increase in membership. In May 2011, The New York Times stated that SPUSA had "about 1,000 members nationally". In February 2012, The Root stated that SPUSA had "around 1,500" members.

== Ideology ==
SPUSA argues that socialism can only come through social revolution. SPUSA tendencies include both democratic socialism, for a gradual transformation of society, and revolutionary socialism, for a rapid transformation following a slow "socialist transformation from below" through radically democratic "people's organizations". SPUSA describes socialism as a radically democratic system which "places people's lives under their own control—a classless, feminist, socialist society free of racism, sexism, homophobia or transphobia," and in which "the people own and control the means of production and distribution through democratically controlled public agencies, cooperatives, or other collective groups"; "full employment is realized for everyone who wants to work"; "workers have the right to form unions freely, and to strike and engage in other forms of job actions"; and "production of society is used for the benefit of all humanity, not for the private profit of a few."

Socialist Party candidates support expanding social spending and social ownership of capital. In 2009, Greg Pason's proposals included socializing the United States health care system, a steeply graduated income tax, universal rent control and the elimination of all educational debts and tuition fees. In 1997, Pason called auto insurance "a regressive tax against working people". Moore was also vocal of his support for socialized medicine. Moore supported economic democracy through social ownership and workers' control of reigning industrial and financial institutions.

== History ==
=== Background ===
In 1958, the Independent Socialist League, led by Max Shachtman, dissolved and joined the Socialist Party of America (SPA), which was founded by Eugene V. Debs. Shachtman had written that Soviet communism was a new form of class society, bureaucratic collectivism, in which the ruling class exploited and oppressed the population, and therefore he opposed the spread of communism. Shachtman argued that democratic socialists should work with labor unions and civil rights organizations to build a social democratic "realignment" of the Democratic Party. "Shachmanites" had a great amount of influence on the SPA.

In its 1972 convention, the SPA changed its name to Social Democrats, USA by a vote of 73 to 34, supported by both Co-Chairmen, Bayard Rustin and Charles S. Zimmerman. This rename was meant to be "realistic". The New York Times observed that the Socialist Party had last sponsored Darlington Hoopes as its candidate for president in the 1956 election, who received only 2,121 votes, in just six states. The majority report noted that the name "party" was "misleading" because the SPA no longer sponsored presidential candidates, and also hindered recruitment of activists who participated in the Democratic Party. The name "Socialist" was replaced by "Social Democrats" because many American associated the word "socialism" with Soviet communism. The party also wished to distinguish itself from two small Marxist parties.

The convention elected a national committee of 33 members, with 22 seats for the majority caucus, 8 seats for Harrington's Coalition Caucus, 2 for the Debs caucus, and one for the "independent" Samuel H. Friedman. These minority caucuses all opposed the name change. The convention voted on and adopted proposals for its program by a two-one vote, with the majority caucus winning every vote.

=== Founding ===
After their defeat at the convention, members of the two minority caucuses helped to found new socialist organizations. Harrington's Coalition Caucus created the Democratic Socialist Organizing Committee.

The Debs Caucus, led by David McReynolds, formed the Union for Democratic Socialism. On May 30, 1973, the UDS incorporated the Socialist Party of the United States of America. Many activists from the local and state branches of the old Socialist Party of America, including the party's Wisconsin, California, Illinois, New York City, Philadelphia and Washington, D.C. organizations, participated in the reconstitution of SPUSA.

After its founding, the party promoted itself as the legitimate heir of the Socialist Party of America. SPUSA elected Frank Zeidler, former Mayor of Milwaukee, as its first national chairperson. Later, SPUSA nominated Zeidler for President. Zeidler believed the party would be able to collaborate with other socialist parties nationwide to spread the message of socialism.

=== Subsequent history ===
In 2008, SPUSA candidate for President Brian Moore vocally opposed the idea that Barack Obama was a socialist of any kind, saying it was "misleading of the Republicans" to spread that message.

In 2009, the Socialist Party of Connecticut protested in Hartford against Obama's troop surge in Afghanistan.

In 2010, SPUSA Co-Chair Billy Wharton called Obama's 2010 State of the Union Address a "public relations ploy". Wharton criticized the Affordable Care Act as designed "to protect the profit margins of private insurance companies".

In 2012, SPUSA member Pat Noble was elected to the Red Bank Regional High School Board of Education. Noble ran openly as a Socialist, despite the race being nonpartisan.

== Election results ==
SPUSA has fielded electoral candidates for local, state, and federal offices. SPUSA candidates usually run on a SPUSA ballot line, as independent, or as Green Party candidates.

SPUSA has often endorsed members of the Vermont Progressive Party (VPP), such as Peter Diamondstone. Most of these individuals were members of the Vermont socialist Liberty Union Party, but not members of SPUSA. These endorsees-but-not-members of SPUSA are not included below.

SPUSA has won several local offices, but never a state legislature, statewide, or federal office.

=== Elected officials ===
Three candidates endorsed by SPUSA currently hold elected office.

Name	Office	Area	State	District	Term start	Term end
Adriana Cerrillo	Board of Education	Minneapolis	Minnesota	4th	January 4, 2021	January 6, 2029
Pat Noble	Red Bank Regional High School Board of Education	Monmouth County	New Jersey	At-large	January 1, 2013	January 1, 2028
Joyner Emerick (Note: Formerly Sonya Emerick.)	Board of Education	Minneapolis	Minnesota	At-large	January 2, 2023	January 4, 2027
Samantha Pree-Stinson	Board of Estimate and Taxation	Minneapolis	Minnesota	At-Large	January 1, 2022	January 1, 2026
Matt Erard	Downtown District Citizens District Council	Detroit	Michigan	At-Large	May 1, 2011	May 1, 2014
Jon Osborne	Town Council	Hopkinton	Rhode Island	At-Large	January 3, 2011	January 2, 2013
Karen Kubby	City Council	Iowa City	Iowa	At-Large	January 2, 1996	January 3, 2000

=== Presidential elections ===
Year	Presidential candidate	Vice presidential candidate	Popular votes	%	Electoral votes	Result	Ballot access	Notes	Ref
2024	Bill Stodden	Stephanie Cholensky	364	0.0%	0	Lost	1 / 51		
2020	Howie Hawkins	Angela Nicole Walker	405,034	0.3%	0	Lost	29 / 51	(Note: Hawkins/Walker was also nominated by the Green Party and appeared on various ballots as either Green or independent)	
2016	Mimi Soltysik	Angela Nicole Walker	4,061	0.0%	0	Lost	3 / 51		
2012	Stewart Alexander	Alejandro Mendoza	4,430	0.0%	0	Lost	3 / 51		
2008	Brian Moore	Stewart Alexander	6,581	0.0%	0	Lost	8 / 51		
2004	Walt Brown	Mary Alice Herbert	10,822	0.0%	0	Lost	8 / 51		
2000	David McReynolds	Mary Cal Hollis	5,602	0.0%	0	Lost	7 / 51		
1996	Mary Cal Hollis	Eric Chester	4,764	0.0%	0	Lost	5 / 51		
1992	J. Quinn Brisben	Barbara Garson	3,057	0.0%	0	Lost	4 / 51		
1988	Willa Kenoyer	Ron Ehrenreich	3,882	0.0%	0	Lost	6 / 51		
1984	Sonia Johnson	Richard J. Walton	72,161	0.1%	0	Lost	17 / 51	(Note: Johnson/Walton was also nominated by the Citizens Party and appeared on various ballots as either Citizens or independent)	
1980	David McReynolds	Diane Drufenbrock	6,898	0.0%	0	Lost	10 / 51		
1976	Frank Zeidler	J. Quinn Brisben	6,038	0.0%	0	Lost	7 / 51		

In the 1984 presidential election, SPUSA nominated the Citizens Party candidate for president, Sonia Johnson.

In the 2020 presidential election, the SPUSA nominated the Green Party nominee Howie Hawkins for president. Hawkins also received various state-level party endorsements, such as the Liberty Union Party in Vermont, in a bid to unite the "non-sectarian independent Left" behind a single campaign.

=== Congressional elections ===
Year	Candidate	Chamber	State	District	Votes	%	Result	Notes	Ref
2016	Jarrod Williams	Senate	Nevada	At-Large	6,888	0.62%	Lost	ran as Independent	
2014	Susan Purviance	House	Ohio	9th	n/a	0%	Lost	write-in	
2012	Greg Pason	Senate	New Jersey	At-Large	2,249	0.07%	Lost	ran as SPUSA candidate	
2010	Dan La Botz	Senate	Ohio	At-Large	26,454	0.69%	Lost	ran as SPUSA candidate	
2008	Todd Vachon	House	Connecticut	2	15	0%	Lost	write-in	
2008	Marc Luzietti	House	Florida	20	9	0%	Lost	write-in	
2008	Jean Treacy	House	Michigan	1st	2,669	0.81%	Lost	ran as Green	
2006	Greg Pason	Senate	New Jersey	At-Large	2,490	0.1%	Lost	ran as SPUSA candidate	
2006	Willie Norwood	House	New Jersey	2nd	385	0.21%	Lost	ran as SPUSA candidate	
2006	Willie Norwood	House	Massachusetts	1st	n/a	0%	Lost	write-in	
2004	Lisa Weltman	House	Michigan	14th	2,224	0.87%	Lost	ran as Green candidate	
2004	Greg Pason	House	New Jersey	5th	574	0.19%	Lost	ran as SPUSA candidate	
2004	Costantino Rozzo	House	New Jersey	2nd	595	0.22%	Lost	ran as SPUSA candidate	
2004	Walt Brown	House	Oregon	3rd	10,678	3.08%	Lost	ran as SPUSA candidate	
2004	Dorman Hayes	House	Rhode Island	2nd	3,303	1.59%	Lost	ran as SPUSA candidate	
2002	Willie Norwood	House	Massachusetts	1st	n/a	0%	Lost	write-in	
2002	Greg Pason	Senate	New Jersey	At-Large	2,702	0.13%	Lost	ran as SPUSA candidate	
2002	Costantino Rozzo	House	New Jersey	2nd	771	0.46%	Lost	ran as SPUSA candidate	
2002	Walt Brown	House	Oregon	3rd	6,588	2.80%	Lost	ran as SPUSA candidate	
2000	Greg Pason	Senate	New Jersey	At-Large	3,365	0.11%	Lost	ran as SPUSA candidate	
2000	Costantino Rozzo	House	New Jersey	2nd	788	0.34%	Lost	ran as SPUSA candidate	
2000	Walt Brown	House	Oregon	3rd	4,703	1.73%	Lost	ran as SPUSA candidate	
2000	David Duemler	House	Oregon	4th	421	0.14%	Lost	ran as SPUSA candidate	
1994	Greg Pason	House	New Jersey	9th	1,490	0.93%	Lost	ran as SPUSA candidate	

=== Statewide elections ===
Year	Candidate	Office	State	District	Votes	%	Result	Notes	Ref
2020	Robin Laurain	University Trustee	Michigan State University	At-Large	74,495	0.76%	Lost	ran as Green candidate	
2018	Mary Alice Herbert	Secretary of State	Vermont	At-Large	9,706	3.6%	Lost	ran as SPUSA and Liberty Union candidate	
2016	Mary Alice Herbert	Secretary of State	Vermont	At-Large	29,711	10.4%	Lost	ran as SPUSA and Liberty Union candidate	
2014	Mary Alice Herbert	Secretary of State	Vermont	At-Large	17,460	10.3%	Lost	ran as SPUSA and Liberty Union candidate	
2014	Adam Adrianson	University Trustee	Michigan State University	At-Large	33,914	0.62%	Lost	ran as Green candidate	
2013	Maynor Moreno	Governor	New Jersey	At-Large	n/a	0%	Lost	write-in	
2012	Dwain Reynolds	Board of Education	Michigan	At-Large	66,123	0.81%	Lost	ran as Green	
2012	Mary Alice Herbert	Secretary of State	Vermont	At-Large	34,105	13.1%	Lost	ran as SPUSA and Liberty Union candidate	
2010	Diana Demers	University Regent	University of Michigan	At-Large	80,365	1.41%	Lost	ran as Green candidate	
2009	Greg Pason	Governor	New Jersey	At-Large	2,085	0.09%	Lost	ran as SPUSA candidate	
2008	Dwain Reynolds	Board of Education	Michigan	At-Large	94,663	1.12%	Lost	ran as Green	
2006	Jacob Woods	Board of Education	Michigan	At-Large	60,684	0.91%	Lost	ran as Green candidate	
2006	Mary Alice Herbert	Governor	Vermont	At-Large	2,995	1.2%	Lost	ran as SPUSA and Liberty Union candidate	
2005	Costantino Rozzo	Governor	New Jersey	At-Large	2,078	0.09%	Lost	ran as SPUSA candidate	
2004	Ben Burgis	University Trustee	Michigan State University	At-Large	75,047	0.92%	Lost	ran as Green candidate	
2001	Costantino Rozzo	Governor	New Jersey	At-Large	1,537	0.07%	Lost	ran as SPUSA candidate	
1997	Greg Pason	Governor	New Jersey	At-Large	2,800	0.12%	Lost	ran as SPUSA candidate	
1996	Mary Alice Herbert	Governor	Vermont	At-Large	4,156	1.6%	Lost	ran as SPUSA and Liberty Union candidate	
1994	Mary Alice Herbert	Secretary of State	Vermont	At-Large	9,368	4.6%	Lost	ran as SPUSA and Liberty Union candidate	
1992	Mary Alice Herbert	Secretary of State	Vermont	At-Large	21,161	8.0%	Lost	ran as SPUSA and Liberty Union candidate	
1990	Mary Alice Herbert	Secretary of State	Vermont	At-Large	14,555	7.4%	Lost	ran as SPUSA and Liberty Union candidate	

=== State legislature elections ===
Year	Candidate	Office	State	District	Votes	%	Result	Notes	Ref
2020	Jonny Meade	House	Washington	22nd	3,000	5.14%	Lost	nonpartisan election	
2020	Rick Sauermilch	House	Michigan	110th	543	1.21%	Lost	ran as Green candidate	
2018	Matt Kuehnel	House	Michigan	22nd	999	3.3%	Lost	a libertarian socialist who ran as a Libertarian Party candidate	
2018	Maia Dendinger	Senate	Maine	5th	1,109	7.1%	Lost	ran as SPUSA candidate	
2018	David Elliot Pritt	House	West Virginia	32nd	2,384	6.04%	Lost	ran as a Mountain Party candidate	
2016	Seth Baker	Senate	Maine	27th	3,712	16.7%	Lost	ran as Green candidate	
2016	Michael Anderson	House	Michigan	70th	1,584	4.8%	Lost	ran as Green candidate	
2014	Mimi Soltysik	California State Assembly	California	62nd	922 (Note: First-round primary vote)	2.5%	Lost	ran as No Party Preference	
2012	Alex Mendoza	House	Texas	65th	6,763	19.06%	Lost	ran as Green candidate	
2012	Alex Mendoza	House	Texas	65th	1,224	2.31%	Lost	ran as Green candidate	
2012	Jeff Peress	Assembly	New York	13th	395	0.74%	Lost	ran as Green candidate	
2012	John Longhurst	House	Michigan	106th	1,178	2.51%	Lost	ran as Green candidate	
2012	Sean Haggard	House	Michigan	54th	0	0%	Lost	write-in	
2012	Ron Haldeman	House	Indiana	94th	752	3.35%	Lost	ran as SPUSA candidate	
2012	John Strinka	House	Indiana	39th	2,862	9.8%	Lost	ran as SPUSA candidate	
2008	Matt Erard	House	Michigan	53rd	2,200	4.55%	Lost	ran as Green	
2008	Jon Osborne	Senate	Rhode Island	34th	2,494	21.6%	Lost	ran as SPUSA candidate	
2006	Matt Erard	House	Michigan	53rd	847	2.51%	Lost	ran as Independent	
2006	Jeff Brindle	Assembly	Pennsylvania	26th	2,873	17.33%	Lost	ran as SPUSA candidate	
2005	Sharon Chiorazzo	Assembly	New Jersey	2nd	832	0.77%	Lost	ran as SPUSA candidate	
2005	Willie Norwood	Assembly	New Jersey	10th	665	0.61%	Lost	ran as SPUSA candidate	
2005	Scott Baier	Assembly	New Jersey	2nd	584	0.46%	Lost	ran as SPUSA candidate	
1982	William Shakalis	Senate	Massachusetts	Suffolk and Middlesex	4,417	12.3%	Lost	ran as SPUSA candidate	

=== Local elections ===
Year	Candidate	Office	City	District	Votes	%	Result	Notes	Ref
2024	Joshua Bradley	City Council	Raleigh	At-Large	26,727	7.7%	Lost	nonpartisan election	
2022	Joshua Bradley	City Council	Raleigh	At-Large	18,143	6.9%	Lost	nonpartisan election	
2022	Joyner Emerick	Board of Education	Minneapolis	At-Large district	52,365	25.43%	Won	nonpartisan election, elect 2	
2022	Troy Thompson	Mayor	Floodwood	At-Large	51	31.5%	Lost	nonpartisan election	
2021	Pat Noble	Red Bank Regional High School Board of Education	Monmouth County	At-large	1,893	99.2%	Won	nonpartisan election, uncontested	
2021	Samantha Pree-Stinson	Board of Estimate and Taxation	Minneapolis	At-Large	25,547 (Note: First-round votes)	26.8%	Won	nonpartisan election, elect 2, ranked-choice voting (single transferable vote)	
2020	Adriana Cerrillo	Board of Education	Minneapolis	4th district	15,935	50.06%	Won	nonpartisan election	
2020	Andy Argo	Public Library Trustee	Kalamazoo	At-Large	15,965	14.6%	Lost	nonpartisan election	
2020	David Robbins	City Council	Redding				Lost		
2019	Joshua Bradley	City Council	Raleigh	A	10.4	10.4%	Lost	nonpartisan election	
2019	Andy Argo	City Commissioner	Kalamazoo	At-Large	1,449	5.7%	Lost	nonpartisan election, elect 3	
2018	Andrew Saturn	Public Utility Commissioner	Thurston County		41,664	41.7%	Lost	nonpartisan election	
2018	Pat Noble	Red Bank Regional High School Board of Education	Monmouth County	At-large	2,539	98.6%	Won	nonpartisan election, uncontested	
2018	Cobalt McAvinue	Sheriff	Los Angeles County				Lost		
2017	Chris DiLoreto	Peterborough Library Trustee	Hillsborough County				Lost		
2017	Allen Braun	City Council	Bangor				Lost		
2017	Chelsea Rustad	City Council	Tumwater	5	1,153	26.36%	Lost	nonpartisan	
2015	Jeff Peress	County Assembly	Dutchess County, New York	23rd	206	13.72%	Lost	ran as Green candidate	
2015	Pat Noble	Red Bank Regional High School Board of Education	Monmouth County	At-large	1,103	98.6%	Won	nonpartisan election, uncontested	
2012	Joel Benavidez	Justice of the Peace	Bexar County	2nd	4,843	3.09%	Lost	ran as Green candidate	
2012	Pat Noble	Red Bank Regional High School Board of Education	Monmouth County	At-large	1,187	53.6%	Won	nonpartisan election	
2012	Troy Thompson	Mayor	Floodwood	At-Large	60	26.9%	Lost	nonpartisan election	
2011	Matt Erard	Downtown District Citizens District Council	Detroit	At-Large			Won	nonpartisan election	
2011	Peter Ponzetti	Board of Education	Grand Blanc	At-Large	424	10.8%	Lost	nonpartisan election	
2011	Edgar Brandon Collins	City Council	Charlottesville City	Charlottesville	1,480	7.5%	Lost	nonpartisan election	
2010	Jon Osborne	Town Council	Hopkinton	At-Large	1,597	14.3%	Won	ran as Independent, elect 5	
2010	James Arnoldi	Board of Governors	Wayne State University	At-Large	46,757	0.84%	Lost	ran as Green candidate	
2008	Peter Moody	Borough Council	Madison				Lost	write-in	
2004	Carl Williams	Board of Trustees	Oakland Community College				Lost		
2003	Bert Zipperer	Mayor	Madison	At-Large	6,610	16.22%	Lost	nonpartisan election, first-round	
2000	Wendell Harris	Mayor	Milwaukee	At-Large	7,624	18.3%	Lost	nonpartisan election	
1995	Karen Kubby	City Council	Iowa City	At-Large	5,307	52.6%	Won	nonpartisan election	
1991	Karen Kubby	City Council	Iowa City	At-Large	6,380	80%	Won	nonpartisan election	
1989	Karen Kubby	City Council	Iowa City	At-Large	3,519	50.7%	Won	nonpartisan election	
1987	Karen Kubby	City Council	Iowa City	At-Large	2,645	48%	Lost	nonpartisan election	
1985	Karen Kubby	City Council	Iowa City	At-Large	1,974	43%	Lost	nonpartisan election	

== National conventions ==
Name	Location	Date	Attendees	Reports
2025 National Convention	October 24–26, 2025	Virtual		
2023 National Convention	October 20–22, 2023	Virtual	not stated	Organizer issue
2021 National Convention	October 22–24, 2021	Virtual	not stated	Organizer issue
2019 National Convention	October 25–27, 2019	Newark, NJ	not stated	Organizer issue
2017 National Convention	October 25–27, 2017	New York City, NY	"almost 100" attendees	Organizer issue
2015 National Convention	October 16–18, 2015	Milwaukee, Wisconsin, WI	not stated	Organizer issue
2013 National Convention	October 25–27, 2013	New York City, NY	not stated	Organizer issue
2011 National Convention	October 14–16, 2011	Los Angeles, CA	not stated	Organizer issue
2009 National Convention	October 9–11, 2009	Newark, NJ	"just under 100" attendees	Organizer issue
2007 National Convention	October 19–21, 2007	St. Louis, MO	not stated	Organizer issue

== Greg Pason ==
Greg Pason
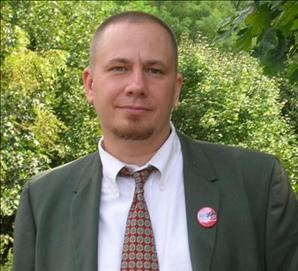
- Pason in 2011

National Secretary of the Socialist Party USA
- Incumbent
- Assumed office October 14, 1995

State Secretary of the Socialist Party of New Jersey
- In office December 1, 2015 – March 5, 2017
- Preceded by: Pat Noble
- Succeeded by: Pat Noble

State Co-Chair of the Socialist Party of New Jersey
- In office July 10, 2011 – December 1, 2015 Serving with Stephanie Gussin
- Succeeded by: Stephanie Gussin (as State Chair)

Personal details
- Born: April 19, 1966 (age 60) Kearny, New Jersey, U.S.
- Party: Socialist
- Spouse: Andrea Pason
- Occupation: Political writer, activist

Gregory Pason (born April 19, 1966) is an American political candidate, activist, and National Secretary of the Socialist Party USA, a position he has held for over 20 years. Additionally, Pason has served in various positions in the Socialist Party of New Jersey and Northern New Jersey Socialist Party, currently serving as treasurer of the former and chair of the latter.

=== Career ===
Pason joined the Party in 1989, shortly after joining the Party's official youth arm, the Young People's Socialist League (YPSL).

As the National Secretary, Pason runs the day-to-day business of the Party, out of the national office in New York City.

He has run for several public offices in the past two decades, including two campaigns for Governor of New Jersey and four campaigns for the United States Senate. He has achieved ballot status for all seven of his campaigns, a rarity for perennial candidates.

=== Campaign history ===
- 2012 US Senate election: 2,249 votes (0.07%)
- 2009 Gubernatorial election: 2,085 votes (0.09%)
- 2006 US Senate election: 2,490 votes (0.1%)
- 2002 US Senate election: 2,702 votes (0.13%)
- 2000 US Senate election: 3,365 votes (0.11%)
- 1997 Gubernatorial election: 2,800 votes (0.12%)
- 1994, District 9 Congressional election: 1,490 votes (0.93%)

== See also ==
- Democratic Socialists of America
- Social Democrats, USA
- Green Party of the United States
- Socialist Party of America
- Socialist Alternative (United States)
- History of left-wing politics in the United States
- History of the socialist movement in the United States

== Works cited ==
- Smallwood, Frank (1983). The Other Candidates: Third Parties in Presidential Elections. University Press of New England. p. 317. ISBN 0-87451-256-5. "6,898 David McReynolds David McReynolds."
- Presidential Elections since 1789. Congressional Quarterly. 1991. p. 248. ISBN 0-87187-609-4.
- Busky, Donald F. (2000). Democratic socialism: A global survey. Greenwood Publishing Group. ISBN 0-275-96886-3.
- Freeman, Joe (2008). We Will be Heard: Women's Struggles for Political Power in the United States. Rowman & Littlefield Publishers. p. 263. ISBN 978-0-7425-5607-2. "3,882 Willa Kenoyer Willa Kenoyer."
