= John Bohn =

American politician

John L. Bohn
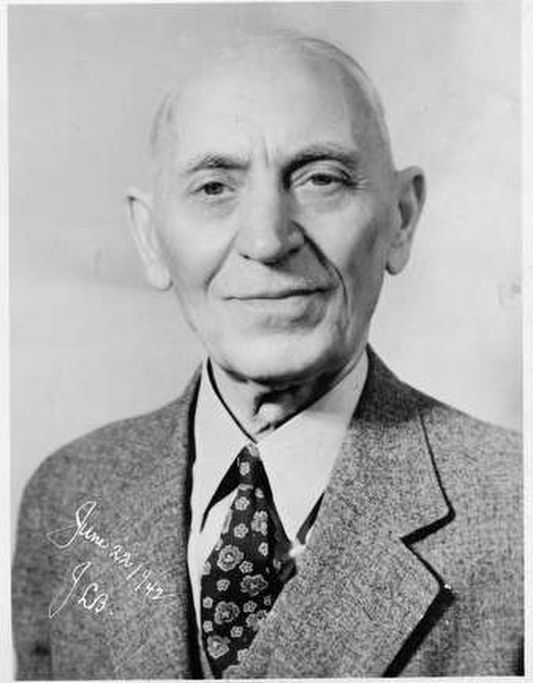

40th Mayor of Milwaukee
- In office April 8, 1942 – April 20, 1948
- Preceded by: Carl Zeidler
- Succeeded by: Frank Zeidler

Personal details
- Born: John Louis Bohn; 1869 Two Rivers, Wisconsin, U.S.
- Died: April 20, 1955 (aged 85–86) Milwaukee, Wisconsin, U.S.
- Occupation: Politician

John L. Bohn (1869 – April 20, 1955) was an American politician who served as mayor of Milwaukee, Wisconsin, from 1942 to 1948.

== Early life ==
John Louis Bohn, the son of German Lutheran immigrants, was born 1869 in Two Rivers, Wisconsin.

== Career ==
Bohn was in the hotel and restaurant business in Michigan and Wisconsin. He served on the Milwaukee County Board of Supervisors from 1898 to 1902. In 1916, Bohn was elected to the Milwaukee Common Council. He was president of the council when Mayor Carl Zeidler resigned in 1942 to serve in the U.S. Navy. Bohn became acting mayor after Zeidler's resignation. In 1944 Bohn was elected to a full mayoral term. In 1948, he was succeeded by Frank Zeidler, Carl Zeidler's brother.

== Personal ==
On April 20, 1955, Bohn died from heart failure in Milwaukee, Wisconsin.

Preceded by Carl Zeidler	Mayor of Milwaukee; 1942–1948	Succeeded by Frank Zeidler
