= MacBird! =

1966 satirical play by Barbara Garson

MacBird! is a 1966 satire by Barbara Garson. It was self-published ('Grassy Knoll Press') as a pamphlet, and the full text appeared in the December 1966 issue of Ramparts magazine and was published as a book by Grove Press in 1967. It was staged in February 1967.

The play superimposes the John F. Kennedy assassination onto the plot of Shakespeare's Macbeth.

== Plot ==
The play burlesques Shakespeare's Macbeth, with lines drawn from other plays such as Hamlet, and Richard III, with Texas and Boston accents. The plot follows MacBird from the 1960 Democratic National Convention, when he becomes John Ken O'Dunc's Vice President ("Hail, Vice-President thou art!"), to Ken O'Dunc's assassination, at the urging of Lady MacBird. Robert Ken O'Dunc then defeats MacBird at the 1968 convention.

In the play, Kennedy becomes "John Ken O'Dunc", Lyndon Johnson becomes "MacBird", Lady Bird Johnson becomes "Lady MacBird", etc. As Macbeth assassinates Duncan, so MacBird assassinates Ken O'Dunc. As Macbeth is defeated by Macduff, so MacBird is defeated by Robert Ken O'Dunc (Robert F. Kennedy).

The play also features the Three Witches, in the form of a student radical, a Nation of Islam member, and a working-class union member. The recently deceased Adlai Stevenson II was depicted as 'The Egg of Head' (the term 'egghead' having been coined in the 1950s to describe intellectual supporters of Stevenson).

In a 2006 Washington Post interview, Garson said she was not seriously accusing Johnson of being complicit in the Kennedy assassination:

"People used to ask me then, 'Do you really think Johnson killed Kennedy?'" Garson, when she was 65, recalls. "I never took that seriously. I used to say to people, 'If he did, it's the least of his crimes.' It was not what the play was about. The plot was a given."

Macbird! began as a short satirical sketch by Garson, a recent graduate of the anti-Vietnam war movement at University of California, Berkeley. She developed the piece into a full-length play with help from writer/director Roy Levine.

== Productions ==
The play, which opened just three years after Kennedy's assassination, was controversial. Some believe that authorities pressured theaters in New York City against producing the play. The Village Gate was the only theater willing to defy this pressure. Macbird! opened there on February 22, 1967, and closed on January 21, 1968, after 386 performances.

Levine, who worked with Garson to develop the sketch to a full-length play, was the original director of Macbird! His bold theatrical vision marked the production throughout the run; near the end of the previews, however, he was replaced by Gerald Freedman. Set design was by Clarke Dunham, costumes were by Jeanne Button, and lights were by Robert Brand. Joel Zwick was the stage manager.

The original cast in order of appearance:

Jennifer Darling as Beatnik Witch and one of MacBird's Daughters
Cleavon Little as Muslim Witch and one of the Conspirators
Tony Capodilupo as Revolutionary Witch
Paul Hecht as John Ken O'Dunc and Wayne of Morse
William Devane as Robert Ken O'Dunc
John Pleshette as Ted Ken O'Dunc
Stacy Keach as MacBird
David Spielberg as Crony
Joel Zwick as Aide and Crony's Crony
Deborah Gordon as Secretary, Messenger and one of MacBird's Daughters
Dalton Dearborn as Chamberlain, Egg of Head and one of the Conspirators
Rue McClanahan as Lady MacBird
John Clark as Earl of Warren and one of the Conspirators
Darling, Capodilupo, Zwick, Gordon and Dearborn also played Spectators.

The original cast recorded a two-disc album of the script on February 6, 1967. The album was released in a box set, along with a copy of the script, on the Evergreen label (Evergreen - EVR 004).

John Clark left the production early to marry Lynn Redgrave. Cleavon Little made his professional acting debut in the play. The play had a long engagement, with a different cast in Los Angeles, where Robert F. Kennedy was assassinated on June 5, 1968 while running for the Democratic presidential nomination. MacBird! was also produced at the Committee Theater in San Francisco around 1968.

== See also ==
- Assassination of John F. Kennedy in popular culture
