= Ben Burgis =

American author and philosopher (born 1980)

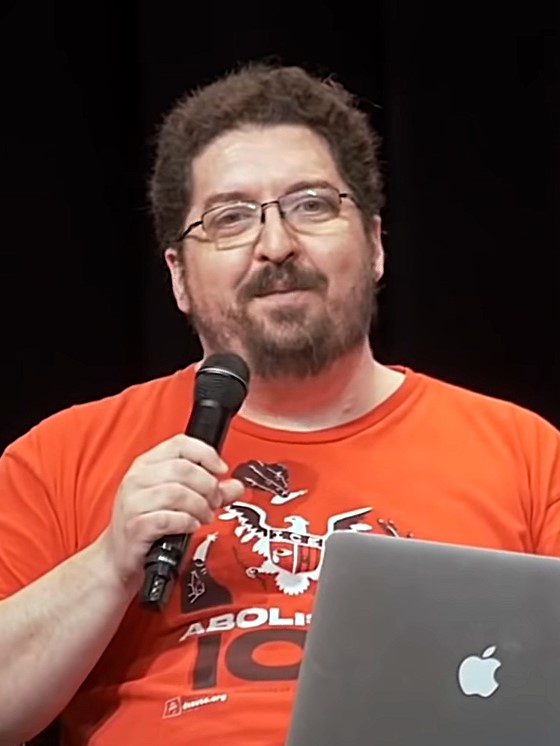
- Burgis in 2021
- Born: 1980 (age 45–46)

Academic background
- Education: University of Miami
- Thesis: Truth is a One-Player Game: A Defense of Monaletheism and Classical Logic (2011)

Academic work
- Institutions: Rutgers University

Ben Burgis (born 1980) is an American socialist political commentator, author and adjunct philosophy professor at Rutgers University. He has written articles for Jacobin, The Daily Beast and MSNBC.

He graduated from Aquinas College in Grand Rapids in 2003, obtained an M.A. in philosophy from Western Michigan University in 2005 and a Ph.D. at the University of Miami in 2011.

Ben Burgis explains socialism primarily based on the analytical Marxist tradition of G. A. Cohen, and focuses on reconstructing Cohen's moral and logical critique of capitalism in a modern way. He mainly uses the rigorous argumentation method of analytical philosophy to argue for the legitimacy of socialism and the problems of capitalism.

== Books ==
- Give Them an Argument: Logic for the Left. Collective Ink. 2019. ISBN 9781789042115.
- With Conrad Bongard Hamilton, Matthew McManus, and Marion Trejo, Myth and Mayhem: A Leftist Critique of Jordan Peterson. Zero Books. 2020. ISBN 9781789045536.
- Canceling Comedians While the World Burns: A Critique of the Contemporary Left. Zero Books. 2021. ISBN 9781789045482.
- Christopher Hitchens: What He Got Right, How He Went Wrong, and Why He Still Matters. Zero Books. 2021. ISBN 9781789047455.
- With Conrad Bongard Hamilton, Matthew McManus, and Ernesto Vargas, Flowers for Marx. Revol Press. 2025. ISBN 978-952-65459-4-3.
- With Bhaskar Sunkara and Mike Beggs, The Blueprint: How Socialism Can Work in the Real World. Verso. 2026. ISBN 9781839768637.

== See also ==
- Analytical Marxism
