= David McReynolds =

American politician and activist (1929–2018)

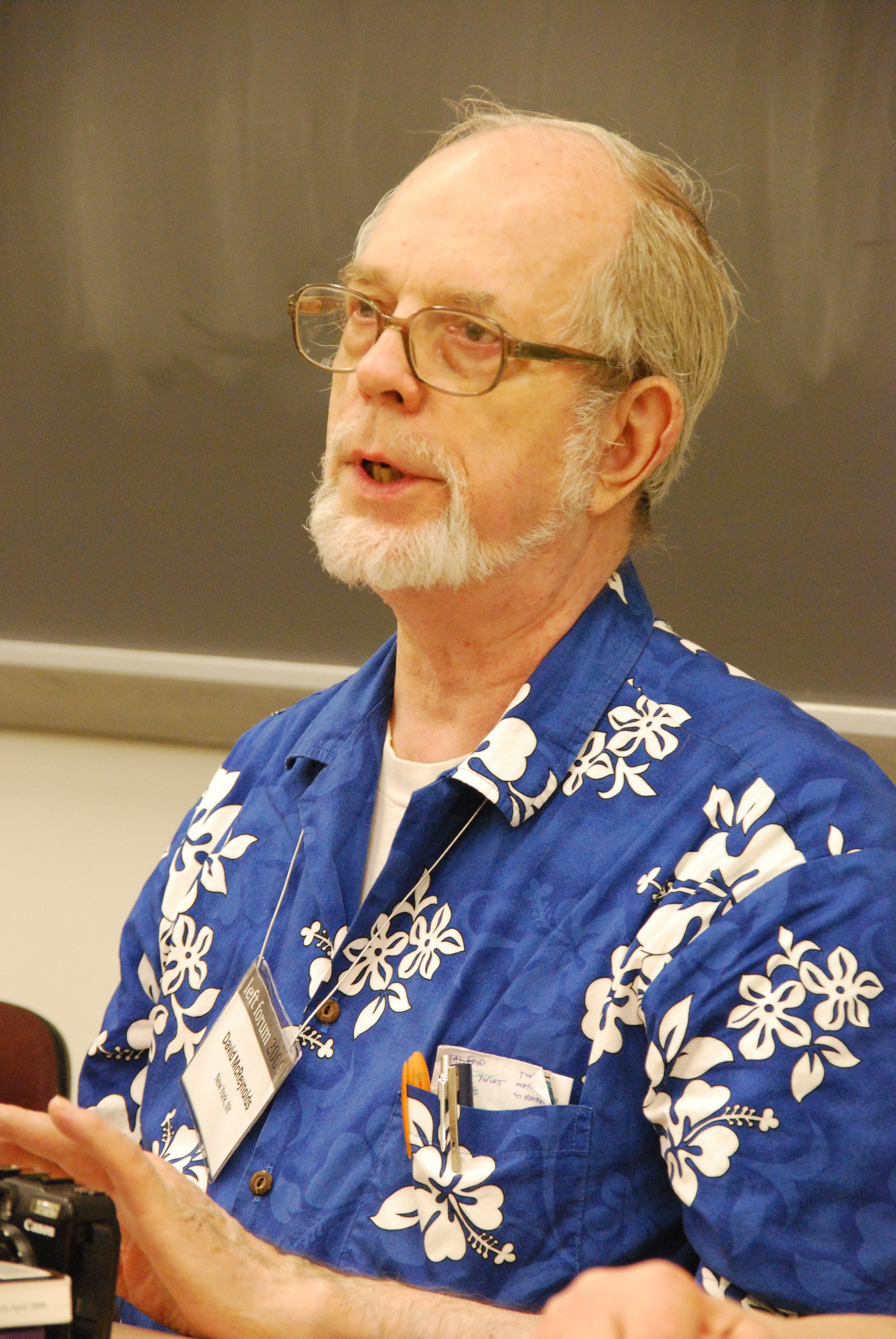
- McReynolds at the 2009 Left Forum in New York City

Personal details
- Born: David Ernest McReynolds; October 25, 1929 Los Angeles, California, U.S.
- Died: August 17, 2018 (aged 88) New York City, U.S.
- Party: Independent (2015–2018)
- Other political affiliations: Socialist Party (1951–2015); Prohibition Party (before 1951); Green (affiliated non-member)
- Education: University of California Los Angeles
- Occupation: Activist, politician, writer

David Ernest McReynolds (October 25, 1929 – August 17, 2018) was an American politician and social activist who was a prominent democratic socialist and pacifist activist. He described himself as "a peace movement bureaucrat" during his 40-year career with the War Resisters League. He was a resident of New York City. McReynolds was twice a candidate for President of the United States, running atop the ticket of the Socialist Party USA in 1980 and 2000. He was the Socialist Party USA's first openly gay presidential candidate. He was also America's first gay presidential candidate if not counting John Hospers - although multiple sources, including the Libertarian Party, have referred to John Hospers, who was in 1972 the first presidential nominee of the newly formed Libertarian Party, as the first openly gay person to run for president of the United States, The Guardian’s obituary stated that his family “strenuously denied” he was gay.

== Early life and education ==
McReynolds, who was born in Los Angeles, described his leftward political turn as “probably a Freudian rebellion against my father,” a journalist and advertising salesman for McGraw-Hill who served in the Air Force Reserve. Between 1957 and 1960, he worked for the editorial board of the left-wing magazine Liberation. He was openly gay and wrote his first article about living as a gay man in 1969.

McReynolds became a member of the Prohibition Party in 1946 or 1947 due to his upbringing as a fundamentalist Baptist, but left the party around the same time that it expelled its entire youth section for being communist. During his time in the Prohibitionist Party he became more left-wing and he later joined the Socialist Party of America in 1951. He became a pacifist in 1949, and attended a pacifist youth conference in Europe in the same year during which he realized that he was homosexual and became an atheist. He attended UCLA and graduated in 1953, and during his education he was arrested for refusing to serve in the Korean War, but the charges were dismissed. He was elected to the National Committee of the Socialist Party in 1954.

== War Resisters League ==
McReynolds was staunchly anti-war and a draft resister, and in 1960 joined the staff of the War Resisters League (WRL), where he remained until his retirement in 1999. In 1965, he lectured on "The Old Left and the New Left" at the newly founded Free University of New York.

He edited the League's bi-monthly, Liberation. In November 1965, he persuaded Casey Hayden to let him publish under the title "Sex and Caste" a paper she had been circulating among women questioning their role and position within Student Nonviolent Coordinating Committee. The publication of the article has since been regarded as a key bridge connecting civil rights to women's liberation.

That same month, November 1965, McReynolds was one of five men who publicly burned their draft cards at an anti-war demonstration at Union Square in New York. This was one of the first public draft-card burnings after U.S. law was changed on August 30, 1965, to make such actions a felony, punishable by up to five years' imprisonment. He was close friends with Bayard Rustin and other prominent peace activists, as well as literary figures such as Quentin Crisp.

In 1968, he signed the "Writers and Editors War Tax Protest" pledge, vowing to refuse tax payments in protest against the Vietnam War, and later became a sponsor of the War Tax Resistance project, which practiced and advocated tax resistance as a form of anti-war protest.

McReynolds was particularly active internationally, both in War Resisters' International, of which he was chairperson for the term 1986–88, and in the International Confederation for Disarmament and Peace, which eventually merged into the International Peace Bureau.

== Socialist Party USA ==
The SPA was renamed the Social Democrats USA by a majority vote at the 1972 convention. Michael Harrington resigned and then formed the Democratic Socialist Organizing Committee (now the Democratic Socialists of America, DSA) with the purpose of "realignment" strengthening the role of labor unions and other progressive organizations in the Democratic Party to pull it to the left. The smallest and the most left wing faction of the SPA, known as the Debs Caucus, including McReynolds, formed the Socialist Party USA (SPUSA). McReynolds was long a member of both DSA and SPUSA.

McReynolds' primary theoretical contribution to socialism came from his blending of a pacifist world-view with a commitment to re-distributive socialist economics. Politically, he was a staunch anti-authoritarian and collaborated with a diverse set of political formations on the democratic left. His widely read pamphlet, The Philosophy of Nonviolence, provides a unique window into the mind of a lifelong activist wrestling with the contradictions and pitfalls which plagued the political left in the 20th century. He concludes that "...there is no living, vital philosophy which does not have 'holes' in it." Consequently, he mapped out a pluralistic approach which is, on the one hand, socialist, yet is entirely engaged with thought systems as seemingly contradictory as Hindu philosophy. He concluded that a brand of pacifist-socialism is best suited for future socialist experiments since it offers the greatest opportunity to prefigure the kinds of democratic relations necessary to create a functional and free society.

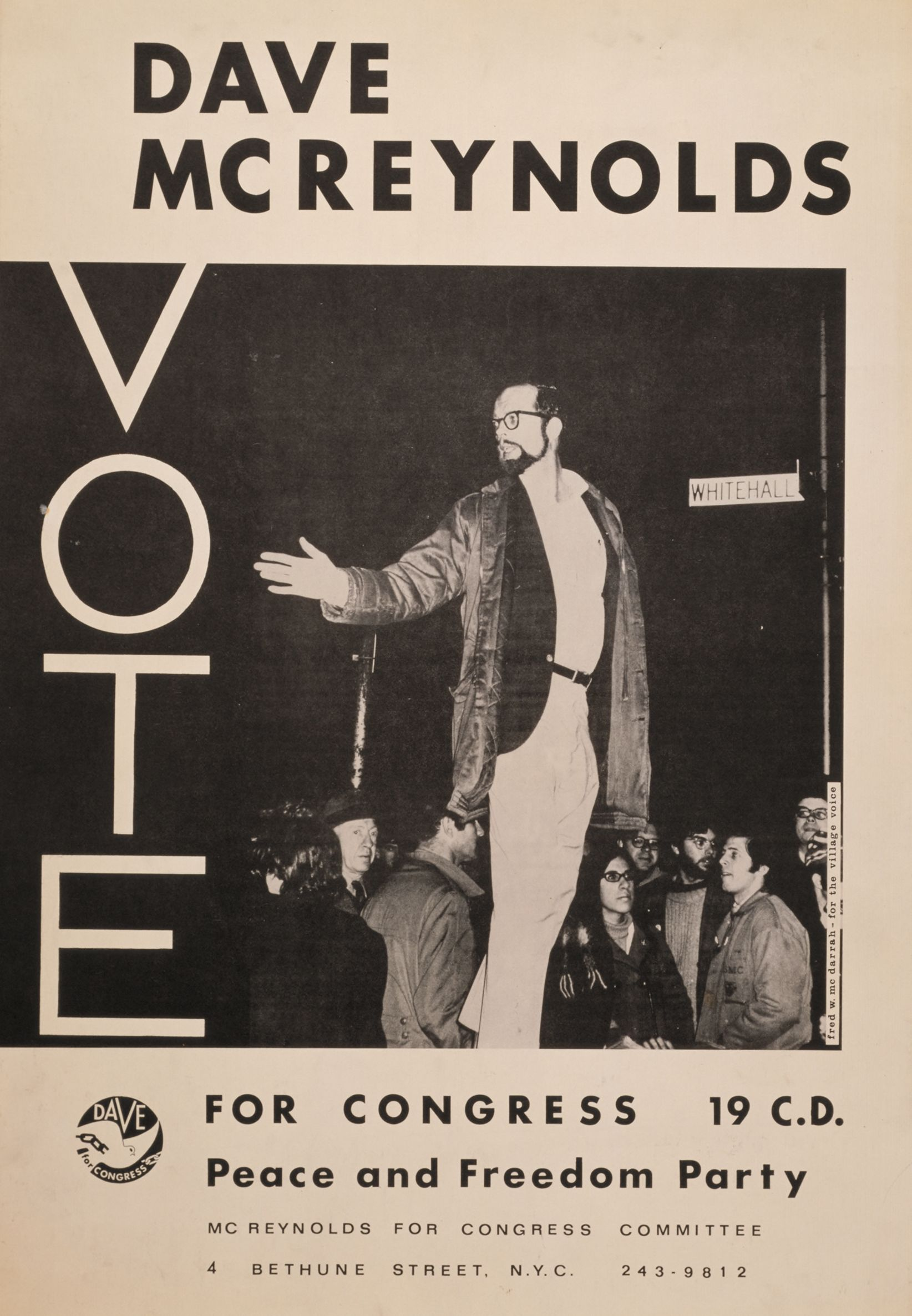
A 1968 Peace and Freedom Party campaign poster featuring McReynolds as a candidate for Congress

In his political career, McReynolds ran for Congress from Lower Manhattan twice and for President twice. In 1958, he ran as a write-in SPA candidate and then in 1968 as a Peace and Freedom Party candidate for Congress in the 19th district pulling in 4.7% of the vote (3,969 votes).

The Socialist Party attempted to unite behind Barry Commoner as a presidential candidate with the Citizens Party during the 1980 presidential election, but was unsuccessful. The party gave its presidential nomination to McReynolds and vice-presidential nomination to Diane Drufenbrock, the party's treasurer, in Milwaukee, Wisconsin. They were on the ballots in ten states and raised around $25,000 during the campaign. The purpose of his campaign was to increase the party's membership. He received more votes than Frank Zeidler, the party's presidential nominee in the 1976 presidential election, in every state except for Wisconsin which McReynolds stated was due to Zeidler's name recognition in the state.

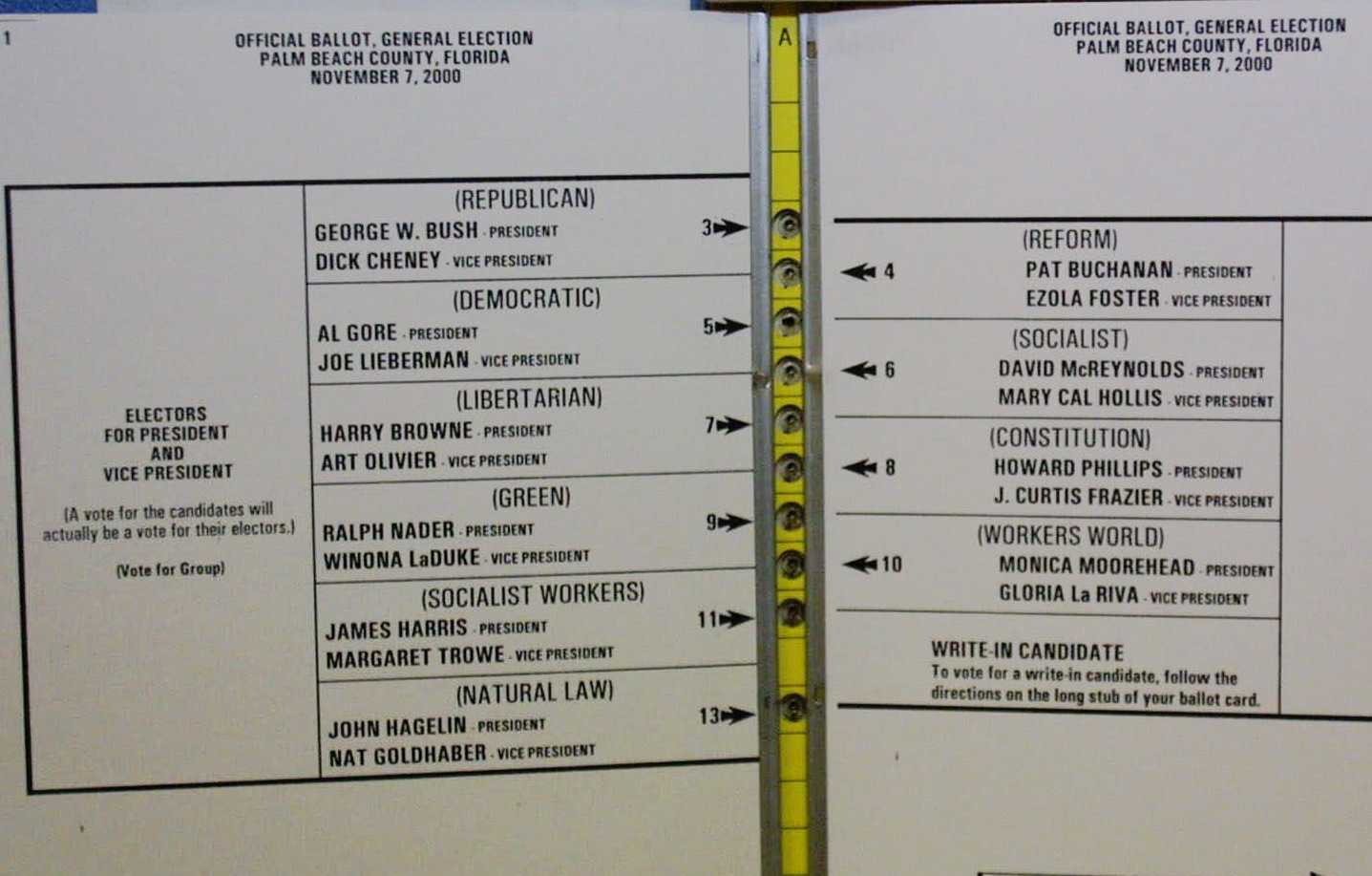
Palm Beach County's "butterfly ballot"

He was given the party's presidential nomination again during the 2000 election. After the 2000 election, the Palm Beach Post speculated that the vast majority of the 2,908 voters who had voided their votes by punching the names of both McReynolds and Democratic candidate Al Gore on a "confusing butterfly ballot" (and also of the over 3,000 more who punched both Gore and Buchanan) had meant to vote for Gore and that mistaken voting on the Palm Beach County butterfly ballot had consequently cost Gore the state's crucial electoral votes, and therefore the election as a whole.

In January 2015, the Socialist Party USA's National Committee voted to censure McReynolds over alleged racist comments made on social media regarding the Charlie Hebdo shooting and shooting of Michael Brown. He resigned from the SPUSA shortly thereafter.

== 2004 Senate campaign ==
On July 10, 2004, McReynolds announced his candidacy running on the Green Party ticket for one of the New York seats in the Senate, running an anti-war campaign against Democratic incumbent Chuck Schumer, where he pulled in 36,942 votes for 0.5% of total.

== Later life ==
McReynolds was active politically until just before his death, attending meetings, speaking in classrooms, being interviewed for films and research, and participating in peace, justice, antiwar, and antinuclear actions. His last arrest was at the U.S. Mission to the United Nations in 2015 at an action calling for immediate nuclear disarmament.

He was an avid photographer throughout his adult life and spent time during the last three years of his life sorting his collection of more than 50,000 photos.

In 2015, McReynolds endorsed U.S. Senator Bernie Sanders for President of the United States, praising him as a "serious candidate" and for not personally attacking his Democratic rival Hillary Clinton.

McReynolds died on August 17, 2018, aged 88, following a fall he sustained at his New York City home.

== See also ==
- List of peace activists

== Works ==
- We Have Been Invaded by the 21st Century. Praeger, 1970.
- "Thinking About Retirement," Nonviolent Activist, March–April 1999.
- "Queer Reflections", New Politics, Vol. 12, no. 1 (2008).
- "David McReynolds Photography"

Party political offices
| Preceded by Frank Zeidler | Socialist Party Presidential candidate 1980 (lost) | Succeeded by Willa Kenoyer |
| Preceded by Mary Cal Hollis | Socialist Party Presidential candidate 2000 (lost) | Succeeded by Walt Brown |
| Preceded by Mark Dunau | Green Party Candidate for United States Senator from New York; 2004 (lost) | Succeeded by Howie Hawkins |
