= Milton Rice Polland =

American politician (1909–2006)

Milton Rice Polland (June 13, 1909 – September 2, 2006) was an American life insurance executive, businessman and political activist from Wisconsin, who served as an Ambassador-at-Large for the Republic of the Marshall Islands.

== Background ==
Polland was born in Milwaukee, Wisconsin, the youngest of 10 children. He graduated from the Marquette University, undergraduate and School of Law.

== Business career ==
Polland began his business career in the life insurance industry. He rose to become Chairman of the Board of Union Trust Life Insurance Co. and served on the boards of several other public and private companies, including for a short time as the Chairman of the Board of Penthouse Magazine.

== Political career ==
In addition to his active business life, Polland had an active political career spanning in excess of 60 years. He sponsored many local, state and national campaigns, including serving as campaign manager for both Wendell Willkie and Hubert Humphrey in their presidential bids. In 1945, as one of the leaders of the Wisconsin Progressive Party, he met with new President Harry S. Truman to discuss Wisconsin politics. Polland was a close friend and adviser to California governors Goodwin Knight and Earl Warren (later Chief Justice of the United States Supreme Court).

Polland's international political career included representing the Republic of the Marshall Islands as its Ambassador-at-Large. His international service spanned decades and included the aid and development of numerous Micronesian nations. He traveled extensively in East Asia meeting with heads of state and business leaders to develop trade relations in the region.

Polland died in Los Angeles, California home on 2 September 2006 and was survived by his two children, nine grandchildren and five great-grandchildren.
