= Mary Cal Hollis =

American politician

Mary Cal Hollis is an American activist. She was a third-party candidate for President of the United States in the 1996 U.S. presidential election, representing the Socialist Party USA (SPUSA) with running mate Eric Chester. Hollis and Chester also received the endorsement and ballot line of Vermont's Liberty Union Party, receiving 674 votes (80.1%) in their primary. Hollis appeared on the syndicated radio program Democracy Now! with two other socialist presidential candidates for a discussion and debate. The SPUSA ticket received 4,765 votes in the general election.

She returned in 2000 as the vice-presidential candidate of the SPUSA, running with David McReynolds and receiving 5,602 votes.

Hollis lives in Colorado. She is a native of Pine Bluff, Arkansas.

Party political offices
Preceded by J. Quinn Brisben	Socialist Party presidential candidate 1996 (lost)	Succeeded by David McReynolds
Preceded by Eric Chester	Socialist Party vice presidential candidate 2000 (lost)	Succeeded by Mary Alice Herbert
