= J. Quinn Brisben =

American poet (1934–2012)

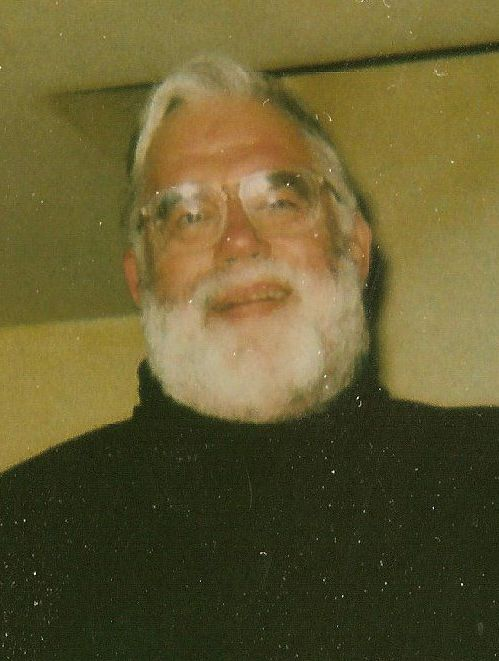
- Brisben in 1992
- Born: September 6, 1934; Enid, Oklahoma, U.S.
- Died: April 17, 2012 (aged 77); Chicago, Illinois, U.S.
- Education: University of Oklahoma; University of Wisconsin-Madison
- Occupations: Teacher; political activist
- Political party: Socialist
- Spouse: Andrea
- Children: 2

John Quinn Brisben (September 6, 1934 – April 17, 2012) was an American teacher, author, and political activist from Chicago, Illinois. Brisben was on the Socialist Party USA's presidential ticket twice. He was the party's vice-presidential nominee in 1976 alongside former Milwaukee mayor Frank P. Zeidler. In 1992, he returned to SPUSA's ticket when he ran as a candidate for president of the United States.

== Background ==
John Quinn Brisben was born September 6, 1934, to Olive and John Brisben of Enid, Oklahoma. He grew up during the Dust Bowl era with his brother, Joseph, matriculating through Enid Public Schools and graduating Enid High School in 1952. While in Enid he worked for the Enid News & Eagle and radio station KCRC. He also studied at Phillips University. He met Andrea Rosaaen, a needlepoint artist, while studying at the University of Oklahoma. He graduated from the College of Arts and Sciences in 1955, and she from the College of Fine Arts in 1954. They married in 1955 and then lived for some time in Madison, Wisconsin while he studied for his graduate degree at the University of Wisconsin-Madison. He was an agnostic.

== Teaching career ==
J. Quinn Brisben taught history and social studies for 32 years at the high school and middle school level, including briefly in Gurnee, Illinois before relocating to Chicago, where he taught at Mason Upper Grade Center, Thomas Kelly High School and Harlan High until his retirement in 1990. He served several terms as a representative in the American Federation of Teachers, Local 1, and frequently served on strike committees. He received several teaching awards, including being named Teacher of the Year by Teachers for Integrated Schools in 1964.

== Activism ==
J. Quinn Brisben was active as an ally in many social movements during his lifetime, beginning with the Civil Rights Movement. Brisben took part in the Mississippi Freedom Summer of 1964—where he was briefly jailed—and in several Southern Christian Leadership Conference-sponsored activities in Alabama from 1965 to 1967. As a student at the University of Oklahoma in the 1950s, Brisben was once physically attacked for being the first white member of the local NAACP chapter. He was active in the anti-Vietnam War movement and served as a boycott captain for the United Farm Workers. In July 1990, he and Andrea helped smuggle 3,000 condoms donated by ACT-UP Chicago to the Moscow Lesbian and Gay Union. Around the time of his run for president in 1992, Brisben had been primarily involved in the disability rights movement, with American Disabled for Attendant Programs Today (ADAPT), even serving three days in an Orlando jail for taking part in an ADAPT demonstration. He was arrested 22 times as a political activist.

== Socialist Party USA ==
Brisben had been a member of the Socialist party since 1959. He attempted to run for mayor of Chicago in 1975 via a write-in campaign after failing gain enough signatures to be placed on the ballot.

=== 1976 vice presidential campaign ===
Brisben was Frank P. Zeidler's vice presidential running mate in 1976 for the Socialist Party USA. The Miami Herald reported that Brisben traveled via Amtrak across the country speaking to small groups of socialists. On the trail, he was described as speaking with "an unpretentious charm which combines a down-home practicality and a simple humor." Only on a handful of state ballots because of the difficulty and expense of the process, Zeidler/Brisben received 6,038 votes. That election was the first time the Socialist Party had run a presidential candidate since the 1956.

=== 1992 presidential campaign ===
Brisben and his running mate Bill Edwards were nominated at the 1991 Socialist Party USA convention. However, Edwards died during the campaign and writer Barbara Garson was selected to replace him on the ballot. In March 1992, Brisben participated in a presidential debate with other minor party and independent presidential candidates, which was aired on C-SPAN. The Brisben−Garson ticket appeared on the ballots of Tennessee, Utah, Wisconsin, and the District of Columbia; ultimately, they received 3,071 votes.

== Works ==
Brisben published three poetry collections, and a novel, V for Victory Blues. He also contributed interviews to four books written by Studs Terkel, and to the 2003 anthology Queer Crips he contributed a story entitled "A Wedding Celebration" about the gay couple Erik von Schmetterling and Jimmy Schrode who were his fellow activists with ADAPT. He also wrote many articles for the Monthly Review and other journals.

=== Interviews ===
The writer Studs Terkel, a friend, interviewed Brisben in four of his books:

- The Great Divide: Second Thoughts on the American Dream (1988) ISBN 0-394-57053-7
- Race: What Blacks and Whites Think and Feel About the American Obsession (1992). ISBN 978-1-56584-000-3
- Will the Circle Be Unbroken: Reflections on Death, Rebirth and Hunger for a Faith (2001) ISBN 0-641-75937-1
- Hope Dies Last: Keeping the Faith in Difficult Times (2003) ISBN 1-56584-837-3

=== Poetry collections ===
- The Significance of the Frontier: Selected Poems 1966-2002. Chicago: Scars Publications. 2002. ISBN 9781891470578.
- I Saw This: New and Old Poems. Chicago: Scars Publications. 2006. ISBN 9781891470790.
- Late Self Portraits. Becky Davis Design. 2008. ISBN 9780615237121.

=== Novels and stories ===
- V for Victory Blues. Falconart Media LLC. 2010. ISBN 9780974080499.
- A Few Old Stories: Posthumous Reminiscences. Falconart Media LLC. 2013. ISBN 978-0974080475.

=== Journal articles ===
- Brisben, J.Q. (1997). "Surviving in Tough Country." Monthly Review. 49. 59. 10.14452/MR-049-07-1997-11_9.
- Brisben, J.Q. (1999). "Mass Movements Need Mass History." Monthly Review. 50. 55. 10.14452/MR-050-08-1999-01_8.
- Brisben, J.Q. (1998). "The Cicerone at Antietam." Michigan Quarterly Review. 37. 236–237.
- Brisben, J. Quinn. "Pillar of Fire: America in the King Years, 1963-65." Monthly Review, Jan. 1999, p. 55+. Gale Document Number: GALE|A53972893
- Brisben, J. Quinn. "The Children." Monthly Review, Jan. 1999, p. 55+. Gale Document Number: GALE|A53972894
- J. Quinn Brisben (1965) A HISTORY OF RACISM, Equity & Excellence in Education, 3:1, 36–37, DOI: 10.1080/0020486650030108
- Brisben, J. Quinn. "No Pity: People with Disabilities Forging a New Civil Rights Movement." Monthly Review, Nov. 1993, p. 61+. Gale Document Number: GALE|A14541332
- Brisben, J. Quinn. "Red Dirt: Growing Up Okie." Monthly Review, Dec. 1997, p. 59+. Gale Document Number: GALE|A20348067
- Brisben, J. Quinn. "ADAPT sets a good example." Monthly Review, Feb. 1992, p. 35+. Gale Document Number: GALE|A11832060
- Brisben, J. Quinn. "Witness Against the Beast: William Blake and the Moral Law." Monthly Review, Sept. 1994, p. 59+. Gale Document Number: GALE|A15823658
- Brisben, J. Quinn. "A Wedding Celebration" Bent: A Journal of Crip/Gay Voices. Nov. 2001.

== Death ==
J. Quinn Brisben died at his apartment in Chicago, Illinois on April 17, 2012. Andrea was born in 1932, and they were married in 1955, a union that lasted 56 years. They had a daughter named Becky and a son named Michael. Andrea founded Changing Woman Designs, a needlepoint pattern company, in 1991 which she ran until her death on August 5, 2016.

Party political offices
| Preceded by Willa Kenoyer | Socialist Party presidential candidate 1992 (lost) | Succeeded by Mary Cal Hollis |
| Preceded by — | Socialist Party vice presidential candidate 1976 (lost) | Succeeded by Diane Drufenbrock |
