= Walt Brown (politician) =

American politician (born 1926)

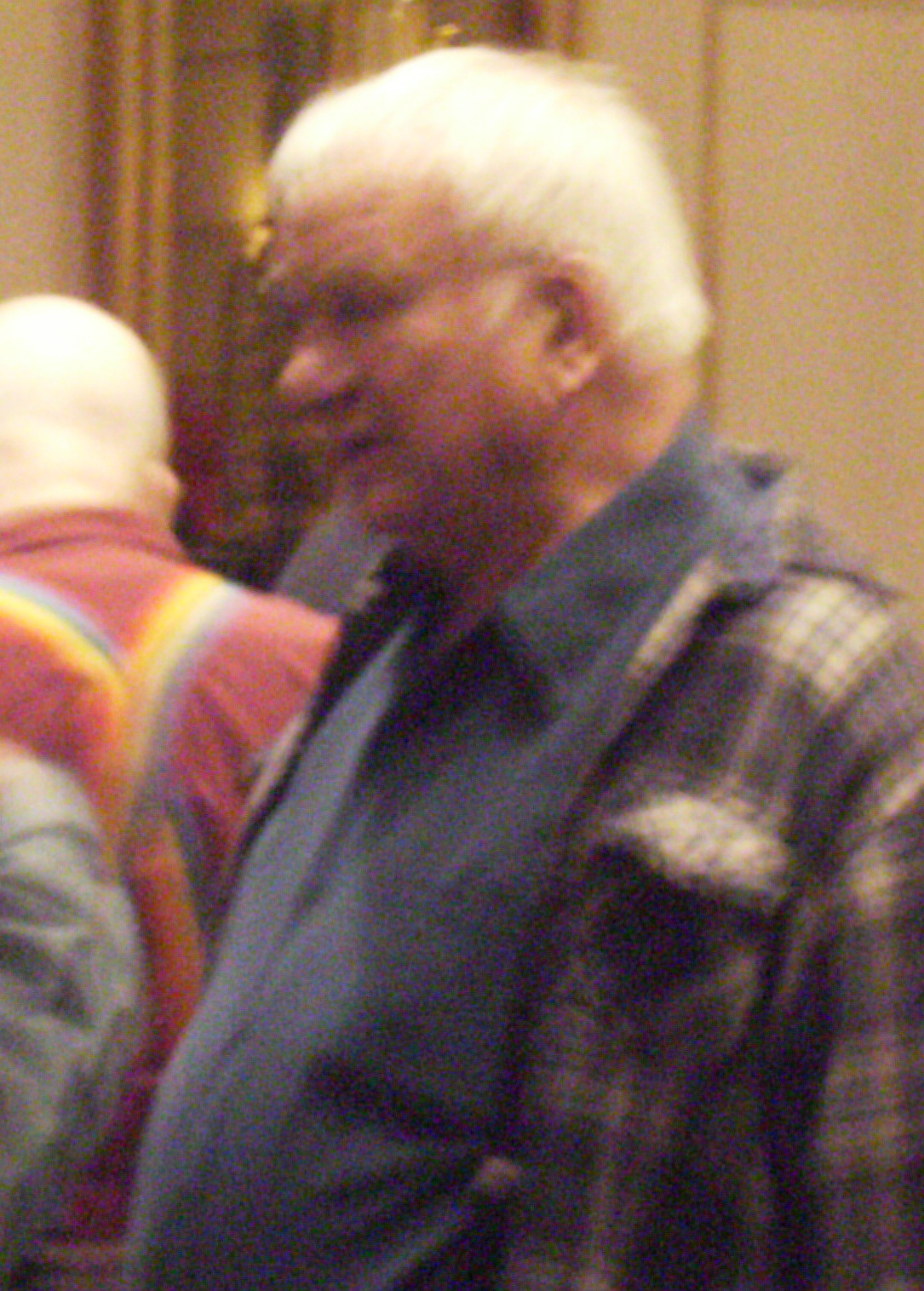
- Brown in 2007

Member of the Oregon Senate from the 13th and 12th district
- In office 1975–1987
- Preceded by: George Eivers
- Succeeded by: Bill Kennemer

Personal details
- Born: Walter Frederick Brown; July 28, 1926 (age 100) Los Angeles, California, U.S.
- Party: Progressive
- Other political affiliations: Socialist; Democratic; Pacific Green
- Spouses: Barbara May Porter Stahmann (m. 1950; died 1999); Beverly Lois Isbell (m. 2007)
- Children: 3
- Education: University of Southern California; Harvard University; Boston University; University of Oregon
- Occupation: Attorney
- Website: waltbrown.org

Military service
- Allegiance: United States
- Branch: United States Navy
- Service years: 1944–1970
- Rank: Commander
- Conflict: Korean War

Walter Frederick Brown (born July 28, 1926) is an American former politician and attorney. From 1975 to 1987, Brown served as a Democratic member of the Oregon State Senate. Brown later ran in third party campaigns, being nominated by the Socialist Party USA as its nominee for president in the 2004 United States presidential election.

Brown ran as a Socialist Party of Oregon candidate for the U.S. Congress in Oregon's 3rd congressional district in 1998, 2000, 2002 and 2004 and was the Pacific Green Party candidate for Oregon Attorney General in 2008 and the Oregon Progressive Party candidate for Oregon State Treasurer in 2010.

== Family background ==
Brown was born in Los Angeles, California, to Walter Andrew Brown (August 11, 1897 – November 10, 1978), attorney at law (with prior employment as an auto mechanic, truck driver, and claims adjuster), and Emily Anna (née Weber; October 30, 1897 – February 25, 1978), an elementary school teacher. His ancestry includes English, German, and French.

== Career as an attorney ==
In June 1944, during World War II, Brown volunteered for active duty in the U.S. Navy at age 17. He served in the Pacific and China on the USS Carter Hall (LSD-3). After his honorable discharge in June 1946, and while in the inactive U.S. Navy Reserve, he attended the University of Southern California (USC) on the G.I. Bill, earning a B.A. in law, cum laude (1949), and a Juris Doctor (J.D.) (1952). While at USC he was a Rhodes Scholar nominee. He was also elected to Phi Beta Kappa and Phi Kappa Phi.

In 1952, Brown was recalled to active duty during the Korean War. He was commissioned as an officer. While in the Navy he served as an attorney for disabled Navy personnel; an instructor at the U.S. Naval Justice School in Newport, Rhode Island; legal officer at Great Lakes (Illinois), Boston, and Subic Bay, Philippines; special prosecutor in Vietnam; an appellate attorney in Washington, D.C.; and as a general court-martial judge in San Diego serving in the Judge Advocate General Corps (JAG). He retired in 1970 as a commander, with 26 years of service. Brown also continued his education: Harvard Law School (constitutional law (1958)); Boston University (international relations M.A. (1961)); the Judge Advocate General's School University of Virginia, (Master of Laws degree in military law (1965)); University of Oregon (library science M.L.S. (1975)).

Upon Brown's retirement from the Navy he was hired as an associate professor at the Northwestern School of Law of Lewis and Clark College, teaching from 1970 to 1980. From 1975 to 1987 he also served in the Oregon State Senate as vice chair of the Judiciary Committee and as co-chair of the Legislative Counsel Committee (which drafts all bills for the Legislature). From 1989 to 1991, he served as Malheur County counsel and as Malheur County deputy district attorney. He volunteers as general counsel of the Oregon Consumer League from 1987 to 1989 and 1991 to present, and as a volunteer attorney with the Consumer Justice Alliance since 2000. In 2003 Brown received two awards from the Oregon State Bar in the active emeritus member category: one for the most Legal Services to the Poor, another for Total Hours of Pro Bono Services.

== Political career ==
=== Oregon Senate ===
Brown served three terms in the Oregon State Senate, elected as a Democrat, from 1974 to 1986. He was responsible for passing the world's first ban on ozone-destroying chlorofluorocarbons (CFCs) in 1975, which served as a model for several other governments. The ban went into effect in 1977 in Oregon, allowing the Oregon Legislative Assembly to make any needed adjustments (such as to allow CFCs to continue to be used in inhalers for people with asthma).

=== Congressional campaigns ===
Brown ran for the United States House of Representatives for Oregon's 3rd congressional district four times against incumbent Earl Blumenauer.

=== 2004 presidential campaign ===
Brown, a social democrat, was nominated by the Socialist Party USA (SPUSA) at their November 2003 convention over revolutionary socialist Eric Chester of Massachusetts. After the convention, party members learned that Brown had previously held anti-abortion views. Because of these views, a movement to recall Brown as the SPUSA presidential nominee ultimately failed, but much of the party's organization failed to support the ticket. Despite this, Brown and his running mate Mary Alice Herbert won ballot access in eight states and had write-in status in eight others. On election day, Brown/Herbert came in 8th in the popular vote, earning 10,837 votes, which was more than any of the Socialist Party's presidential candidates since 1952 and the most in the Socialist Party USA's history since its first presidential campaign in 1976. Several third party activists, including Darcy Richardson of Florida and Steve Hauser of Wisconsin, assisted with Brown's presidential campaign.

=== Oregon attorney general campaign ===
In 2008, Brown ran as a Pacific Green Party candidate for the office of Attorney General in Oregon in the November 2008 elections. Brown received 76,856 votes for 5.1% of the total vote.

=== Oregon treasurer campaign ===
In June 2010, he was selected as the Pacific Green candidate for Oregon State Treasurer in the 2010 Oregon elections but he ended his campaign for their nomination and ultimately received the nomination of the Progressive Party instead and was listed as the Progressive candidate in the Oregon Voters' Pamphlet. Brown finished third of four candidates with 38,316 votes (3%).

== Other activities ==
Brown is the President of the Eastside Democratic Club (not affiliated with the Democratic Party) and on their Agenda Committee as well. Brown is also on the Board of Directors for the Oregon Consumer League. He is a volunteer attorney for both the Oregon Consumer League and the Consumer-Justice Alliance. He and his wife, Beverly, volunteer to both the Sunnyside Homeless Shelter and the St. Francis Dining Hall in Portland.

=== The Barbara S. and Walter F. Brown Memorial Park ===
Near the conclusion of Brown's twelve years in the Oregon State Senate, he served as Chairman of the Senate Agriculture and Forestry Committee. At that time Brown and his wife purchased 185 acres (0.75 km^{2}) of land on both sides of the Siletz River in Lincoln County on the Oregon Coast. This land had been clear-cut during World War I. The couple spent many years of hard work to reforest the land with Sitka spruce, western red cedar, and Douglas fir, all with the express intention of making a public park. When Barbara died in 1999, the park had not been completed and Walt continued to manage this forest alone. On August 8, 2007, he donated the land to Lincoln County, which guaranteed that hunting and logging would not be allowed.

Political offices
Preceded by	Member of the Oregon State Senate from the 12th and 13th district 1975-1987	Succeeded by Bill Kennemer
Party political offices
Preceded by David McReynolds; 2000	Socialist Party USA nominee for President; 2004 (lost)	Succeeded by Brian Moore; 2008
