= Barbara Garson =

American playwright

- Born: July 7, 1941 (age 85); Brooklyn, New York, U.S.
- Occupations: Playwright, author
- Known for: MacBird!

Barbara Garson (born July 7, 1941) is an American playwright and author, perhaps best known for the 1966 play MacBird!

== Education and personal life ==
Garson attended the University of California, Berkeley, where she earned a B.A. specializing in Classical History in 1964. She was active in the Free Speech Movement, as the editor of The Free Speech Movement Newsletter, which was printed on an offset press that she herself had restored. She was one of 800 arrested on December 2, 1964 at a sit-in at Sproul Hall, Berkeley, following the "Machine Speech" by Mario Savio.

In 1968, Garson had a child, Juliet, and in 1969 she went to work at The Shelter Half, an anti-war GI coffee house near Fort Lewis Army base in Tacoma, Washington. In the early 1970s, she moved to Portland Oregon with her daughter Juliet for a few years. She then relocated to Manhattan, and took up writing again, publishing short, humorous essays and theater reviews primarily for The Village Voice as well as plays.

== MacBird! ==
Garson's most famous work, MacBird!, a 1966 counterculture drama/political parody of Macbeth is "one of the most controversial plays produced in the 1960s". It was originally intended for an anti-war teach-in at Berkeley. The first edition, which was self-published on the same offset press as the Free Speech Movement Newsletter, had sold over 200,000 copies by 1967 when the play opened in New York in a production starring Stacy Keach, William Devane, Cleavon Little, and Rue McClanahan. While these then-unknown actors went on to become fixtures in American theater, movies and television, the author "disappeared from public view at the height of fame". The play has since seen over 300 productions worldwide and sold over half a million copies". MacBird! is remembered as an attack on then-U.S. President Lyndon Johnson. In fact, it presented Johnson's predecessor, John F. Kennedy, and his would-be successor Robert F. Kennedy as equally unacceptable but more dangerously alluring. Garson wanted her fellow 1960s activists to step away from the Democratic Party and create their own institutions, including a third party. To that end, she could sometimes be seen outside of California theaters where MacBird! was playing, gathering signatures to put the Peace and Freedom Party on the ballot. Critical reaction was mixed and the play "has had advocates and detractors of equal stature." Dwight Macdonald, in The New York Review of Books, called it "the funniest, toughest-minded most ingenious political satire I've read in years…" Robert Brustein wrote that "Although this play is bound to start a storm of protest (not all of it unjustified) and may even be suppressed by some government agency, it will probably go down as one of the brutally provocative works in the American theater as well as one of the most grimly amusing," and praised Garson as "an extraordinarily gifted parodist."

== Other plays ==
Garson's next full-length play, Going Co-op (1972), was a comedy about residents of an Upper West Side apartment house going co-op and a floundering left wing political collective that comes home to help organize the tenants who cannot afford to change from renters to owners. It was written with Fred Gardner, who is credited with founding the first of the Vietnam-era GI Coffee Houses.

Garson's musical children's play The Dinosaur Door, set on a class trip to the Natural History Museum, was performed at the Theater for the New City in 1976. It featured a cast of children including seven-year-old Mark Vincent, now known as the action hero Vin Diesel. It was awarded an Obie for playwriting in 1977.

A Village Voice review said about The Dinosaur Door: "What's so marvelous is the richness of this stew, the... world behind the exhibits and the absolutely on-the-mark funny, sympathetic kids—each special and practical, each a person in his own or her own right. I liked the satirical but warmly affectionate eye with which Garson sees every character and the show's tenderly complex relationships. I like that Garson is not chary with ideas because she is writing for kids."

A teleplay of The Dinosaur Door was commissioned by producer-director Joyce Chopra in 1982, but no film of the play was made.

A full-length play, The Department (1983), written for and performed by the organizing group Women Office Workers (WOW), is set in a bank's back office that is about to be automated. The Department, though a light farce, sets out many of the problems that Garson expands on in her 1989 book The Electronic Sweatshop.

== Non-fiction ==
In addition to plays, Garson is the author of four non-fiction books:

- All the Livelong Day: The Meaning and Demeaning of Routine Work, Doubleday, New York, 1975.; Expanded edition, Penguin, 1994.
- The Electronic Sweatshop: How Computers Are Transforming the Office of the Future into the Factory of the Past, Simon & Schuster, N.Y., 1988.
- Money Makes the World Go Around: One Investor Tracks Her Cash Through the Global Economy, Viking, N.Y., 2001.
- Down the Up Escalator: How the 99 Percent Live in the Great Recession, Doubleday, N.Y., 2013.

These books address complex phenomena of capitalism through dramatic anecdotes and interviews. Each describes a historical turning point through the voices of a range of people who may or may not fully grasp the changes happening in their own lives.

In Money Makes the World Go Around, Garson explicates the global economy by depositing her book advance in a one branch small town bank, and then following that money's theoretical path around the world. At one point, her money was invested in Suez, the French company that owned Johannesburg's water system. When protesters were arrested for opposing price increases and water shut offs, Garson organized a "shareholders" demonstration on their behalf in front of the South African consulate in New York City.

Garson insists that activism is essential to her writing. But her plays and non-fiction feature layered characters and plot twists that are often irrelevant or even inimical to liberal and socialist tenets. Indeed, Money Makes the World Go Around was largely ignored by the anti-globalization movement within which Garson was active, while a The Wall Street Journal review said "Ms. Garson recounts her travels with a disarmingly balanced combination of amazement and social concern" and Business Week said "...her voice is so persistently good-natured and her intelligence so obvious that by the end of this curious capitalist's Baedeker you can't help but trust her gentle judgments."

Her latest book, Down the Up Escalator: How the 99 Percent Live in the Great Recession, is concerned with the effects of the Great Recession "reshaping people's lives and prospects". Kirkus Reviews admires Garson's "brutal clarity" and calls it a "skillful presentation that lifts the veil". George Packer, writing in The New Yorker, says of Garson, "she's written several books of social reportage about work and money, and this steady engagement over many decades has honed an appealing voice: wry, modest, realistic...like a sympathetic but slightly critical friend, ready with a hug and unable not to give advice."

Garson is the author of over 150 articles in publications including Harper's, The New York Times, McCalls, Newsweek, Geo, The Village Voice, Ms, The Washington Post, The Boston Globe, The Baltimore Sun, Los Angeles Times, The Denver Post, The Australian, Newsday, Modern Maturity, Mother Jones, The Arizona Republic, The Guardian, The Nation, Il Posto, Znet and The Nation's tomdispatch.com.

== Awards ==
Garson was awarded an Obie for The Dinosaur Door and a Special Commission from the New York State Council on the Arts, for the Creation of Plays for Younger audiences. She has received a Guggenheim Fellowship, a National Endowment for the Arts Fellowship, a Louis M. Rabinowitz Foundation Grant, the New York Public Library Books to Remember award and Library Journal's Best Business Books of 1989 award, and a MacArthur Foundation Grant for reading and writing.

== Later activism ==
In the 1992 U.S. Presidential election, Garson was the running mate for J. Quinn Brisben on the Socialist Party USA ticket, replacing Bill Edwards, who died during the race. In August 1992, she received a message on her answering machine: "We're sorry to tell you that the Socialist Vice-Presidential candidate, Bill Edwards, has died. We would like your help in writing a press release for the newspapers. And also, would you like to run for Vice President?", which she initially believed to be a joke.

Garson was active in the protest movement against corporate globalization and the protests in advance of the Iraq War.

She was in attendance at Zuccotti Park during the Occupy Wall Street protests in 2011.
