= Frank Zeidler =

American politician (1912–2006)

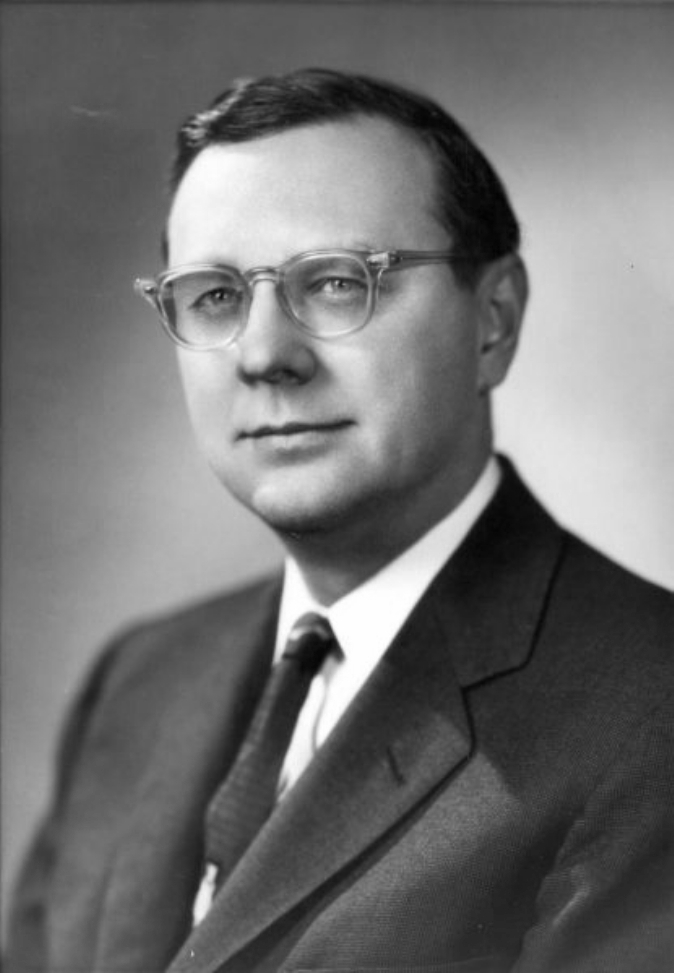
- Zeidler c. 1961

41st Mayor of Milwaukee
- In office April 20, 1948 – April 18, 1960
- Preceded by: John Bohn
- Succeeded by: Henry Maier

Member of the Milwaukee Board of School Directors
- In office April 1941 – April 1948

Surveyor of Milwaukee County
- In office January 1939 – January 1941

Secretary of the Social-Democratic Party of Wisconsin
- In office October 1938 – April 1941
- Preceded by: Walter Polakowski
- Succeeded by: Edwin Knappe
- In office January 1938 – April 1938
- Preceded by: Leonard K. Place
- Succeeded by: Walter Polakowski

Personal details
- Born: Frank Paul Zeidler; September 20, 1912 Milwaukee, Wisconsin, U.S.
- Died: July 7, 2006 (aged 93) Milwaukee, Wisconsin
- Party: SPA (before 1972); SPUSA (after 1972)
- Other political affiliations: Progressive
- Relatives: Carl Zeidler (brother)
- Education: University of Chicago; Marquette University; University of Wisconsin

Frank Paul Zeidler (September 20, 1912 – July 7, 2006) was an American socialist politician and mayor of Milwaukee, Wisconsin, serving three terms from April 20, 1948, to April 18, 1960. Zeidler, a member of the Social-Democratic Party of Wisconsin and the Socialist Party of America, is the most recent Socialist Party candidate to be elected mayor of a large American city.

== Early life and career ==
Zeidler was born in Milwaukee on September 20, 1912. He graduated from West Division High School at the age of sixteen. He studied at both the University of Chicago and Marquette University, but was never able to graduate due to ill health. He became a socialist because of socialism's emphasis on peace and improving the conditions for workers.

In an interview, Zeidler said he became a socialist in 1933 "because of several things in its philosophy. One was the brotherhood of people all over the world. Another was its struggle for peace. Another was the equal distribution of economic goods. Another was the idea of cooperation. A fifth was the idea of democratic planning in order to achieve your goals. Those were pretty good ideas". He distanced himself from the beliefs of communism, especially communism linked in any way to the Soviet Union. Indeed, he was (and remained) an active Lutheran, a religious commitment which he saw as being fulfilled rather than contradicted by his Socialist activism.

Later, however, he credited his adoption of socialism to reading left-wing literature, with the majority being written by Eugene V. Debs and Norman Thomas during the Great Depression.

Zeidler became an active member of the Young People's Socialist League (YPSL), the youth branch of the Socialist Party of America. He later became the leader of the Milwaukee branch of the Red Falcons during the 1930s, and served as secretary of the Socialist Party of Wisconsin early in 1938 and again from late 1938 to 1941.

== Elections ==
Zeidler was elected as the surveyor of Milwaukee County in 1938 on the Progressive Party ballot line (the Socialist Party and Progressives were in coalition in Milwaukee at that time). In 1940, he was the Progressive nominee for Wisconsin State Treasurer, coming in second place with 31% of the vote.

In 1940, his older brother, Carl (a Republican), was elected mayor of Milwaukee. The following year, Zeidler himself was elected to a six-year term on the Milwaukee Board of School Directors (a non-partisan office). In 1942, Zeidler ran as the Socialist nominee for Governor of Wisconsin, receiving 1.41% of the vote in a six-way race. He was re-elected to the Milwaukee School Board in 1947.

After two years as mayor, his older brother enlisted in the Navy at the height of World War II and was killed at sea when his ship was lost. In 1944, Zeidler unsuccessfully ran for mayor under the Socialist banner. He failed to receive enough support in the nonpartisan primary to advance to the general election.

== Mayoralty ==
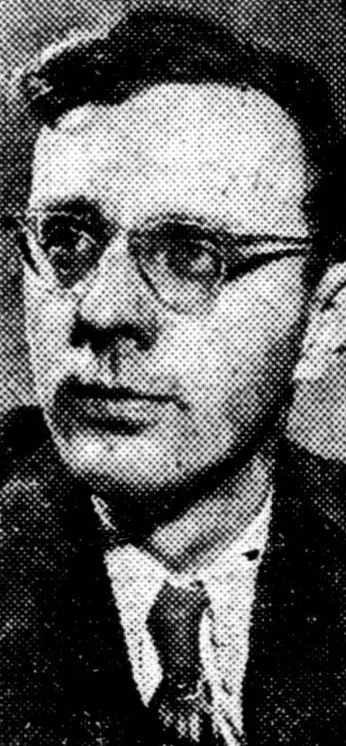
Zeidler c. 1949

Zeidler served as mayor of Milwaukee for three consecutive terms lasting cumulative twelve years (from April 20, 1948 to April 18, 1960).

=== Elections ===
Zeidler ran again for mayor in 1948. He positioned himself as an independent politician receiving backing from labor union leaders, Socialist stalwarts, liberal-leaning Democrats. He was also backed by a group of Republicans who organized as the "Municipal Enterprise Committee".

Zeidler's candidacy was fiercely opposed by many of the local newspapers and many local business interests who were opposed to the prospective resurgence of socialism in the city's municipal politics. Many workers in Milwaukee were threatened for supporting Zeidler. One manufacturer even threatened to fire employees who voted for Zeidler.

After his death, Zeidler's older brother was regarded as local hero, a reputation which later aided the younger Zeidler in his campaign to become mayor. In 1948, Frank Zeidler ran for mayor in a crowded field of fourteen candidates and won, undoubtedly aided by the familiarity of his surname. Zeidler himself would later remark that he considered his 1948 victory to have been an upset fueled by his late brother's popularity. The large field of candidates was due to Mayor John Bohn declining to seek re-election . Among the candidates that year was attorney Henry S. Reuss (a Democrat who later went on to win election to Congress in 1954) and Henry Maier (who would later be elected Zeidler's successor).

Zeidler was Milwaukee's third Socialist mayor (after Emil Seidel [1910-12] and Daniel Hoan [1916-40]), making Milwaukee the largest American city to elect three Socialists to its highest office (a fact that singer Alice Cooper pointed out in the 1992 film Wayne's World).

No socialist allies were elected to the Milwaukee Common Council (city council). A lack of ideological allies on the Common Council was one of the major challenges Zeidler encountered across his three terms as mayor.

Zeidler was re-elected in 1952 and 1956.

=== Growth, annexation, development ===
During Zeidler's administration, Milwaukee grew industrially and geographically.

Under Zeidler, Milwaukee nearly doubled its geographic size through an aggressive campaign of municipal annexations: large parts of the Town of Lake and most of the Town of Granville were annexed to the city. Zeidler was a fierce opponent of separate suburbs, outright declaring, "we do not believe they have the right to exist." He sought to coerce the annexation of all land in Milwaukee County by requiring any area desiring access to the city's water system to submit itself to annexation into the city. Zeidler viewed annexation as granting the city land upon which it could locate new industrial facilities and public housing.

During his mayoralty, the city's park system was upgraded. A 2006 publication by the American Public Works Association recalled that Zeidler always maintained that the projected Milwaukee freeway system should have been built and that the city's competitiveness had been compromised by the failure to complete the planned system. Zeidler also spearheaded the construction of the Milwaukee Arena, numerous library branches. He also spearheaded the construction of many public housing projects in the city, resulting in the construction of 3,200 units of low income housing. He also supported efforts that resulted in the construction of Milwaukee County Stadium. He also successfully advocated for the establishment of the University of Wisconsin–Milwaukee.

Zeidler spearheaded planning and construction of the beginning of Milwaukee's freeway system. He dubbed modern expressways "a citizens' highway". In both 1948 and 1953, city voters approved two bond measures (totaling $8 million) to fund the start of highway development in the city. In 1951, the firm Amman & Whitney was hired by the city to develop a highway plan. In 1952, Zeidler and the Milwaukee Common Council adopted the resultant plan for a $150 million program of highway construction, intended to build 20.4 miles (32.8 km) miles of local highways. In the years that followed, limited funds were available for the projects to progress. Due to the slow pace of progress of the project under city management, in 1954 the city turned over responsibility for developing the city's highway system to the government of Milwaukee County.

Zeidler's plans for the city were only a partial success. Milwaukee doubled in area through annexation and it experienced very little decline in population during a period of American urban decline starting in the 1960s and lasting until about 1990. Suburban residents and governments fiercely resisted annexation and the politics of regional Milwaukee became highly factional. An attorney who sued to block annexation claimed Zeidler planted listening devices in his office. Zeidler, angry about the resistance to his plans, said in 1958: "The city consults with suburban governments, but we do not believe they have reason for existing."

=== Budgets ===
Similar to earlier Milwaukee mayor Daniel Hoan (a fellow socialist), Zeidler was very conservative in his management of municipal budgets and acquisition of new debts. Zeidler opposed creating new debt to fund public projects, opposing the prospect of paying substantial interest to banks. A March 2007 Milwaukee Magazine article recounted, "[Ziedler and Hoan] were tightfisted budget crunchers and so opposed to paying interest to banks they would “pay as you go” for all public projects. Few governments in the nation were so cautious about debt." During his mayoralty, the city avoided borrowing further money to repay loans.

=== Race relations ===
Zeidler faced the vexing issue of race relations as Milwaukee's African-American population tripled during the 1950s. Zeidler was a vocal supporter of the civil rights movement and his opponents tried to exploit this to their advantage. Zeidler's political enemies spread false rumors that Zeidler had put billboards in the South asking blacks to come north.

=== Other matters ===
Zeidler was the longtime Executive Director of the Milwaukee Turners [1948-60] at Turner Hall in Milwaukee, Wisconsin. He also edited and published in the Milwaukee Turner.

Zeidler supported an effort to launch of a local public television station, which resulted in the creation of WMVS.

Zeidler spearheaded the 1959 passage of a pension for municipal employees.

For six years during his mayoralty Zeidler was the American Municipal Association representative to the United States National Commission for UNESCO.

One of Zeidler's final actions in office (in his final week as mayor) was the publication of the Inner Core Report, a study which assessed the social conditions of the inner city and which recommended future remedies to identified ills.

=== Personality and leadership style ===
Zeidler sought to govern through consensus building and collaboration. Unlike many politicians, he did not dole out retribution upon political adversaries.

Zeidler often faced news media criticism and skepticism. He sought to counter this by leaving his office door open to journalists who wished to speak with him, and inviting journalists to attend his meetings. However, this did not avail itself to any decrease in criticism from journalists. Fierce criticism from his adversaries took an emotional toll on Zeidler that impacted him in reaching his ultimate decision to forgo seeking re-election to a fourth term.

=== Retirement ===
Worn-out by 1959, Zeidler declared that he would forgo seeking re-election in 1960. He cited bad personal health and the taxing challenge of dealing with racial tensions in the city as reasons for not running for re-election . Zeidler was only 47 years of age when he left office. He declined invitations by the Socialist Party of America to run as its nominee in the 1960 presidential election.

=== Assessments and reputation ===
In 1957, Milwaukee was ranked by Fortune Magazine as being one of the two best-governed large United States cities.

A 1993 expert survey (of historians, political scientists, and urban experts) conducted by Melvin G. Holli of the University of Illinois at Chicago ranked Zeidler as the twenty-first-best American big-city mayor to have served between the years 1820 and 1993.

According to a 2007 Milwaukee Magazine article, early 21st century public opinion in Milwaukee held a highly positive view towards Zeidler's mayoralty, with many viewing him as having been highly principled.

== Later years and death ==
After leaving office as mayor, Zeidler began working as a consultant to the Ford Foundation. Zeidler also worked as a workforce arbitrator, a mediator, as development director for Alverno College, and served in the administration Governor John W. Reynolds Jr. As a leader of the Public Enterprise Committee, Zeidler was a frequent and severe critic of his successor, Henry Maier. He supported a number of unsuccessful attempts to defeat Maier in subsequent elections.

Zeidler was instrumental in re-forming the Socialist Party as the Socialist Party USA (SPUSA) in 1973, and served as its National Chair for many years. He was the party's presidential nominee in 1976, getting on ten state ballots. The preceding Socialist Party of America had not nominated a presidential candidate since 1956, when it nominated Darlington Hoopes. The re-formed party had 400-600 members nationwide at the time of his presidential campaign. He agreed to run as its presidential nominee when other leading members of the SPUSA declined to do so. He and his running mate, J. Quinn Brisben, received 6,038 votes, including approximately 2,500 in Milwaukee County. His 1976 presidential bid, which he almost certainly knew would not come close to victory, was his only campaign for office following his retirement as mayor. His campaign ended with a small but lively election night party at Milwaukee's Turner Hall, with a reported attendance of 35 people.

On July 26, 2004, Zeidler appeared at the 2004 Green Party National Convention in Milwaukee to welcome that party's delegates to their convention.

Zeidler remained a lifelong Milwaukee resident. He died at Columbia St. Mary's Hospital on July 7, 2006 (aged 93) of congestive heart failure and diverticulitis. He was interred at Forest Home Cemetery in Milwaukee. He was survived by his wife, Agnes, and by six children.

== Writing, scholarship, and legacy ==
Zeidler wrote several books, including not only treatises on municipal government, labor law, socialism, and Milwaukee history, but poetry, renditions of four of Shakespeare's plays into present-day English, and children's stories. His 1961 memoir of his time as mayor, A Liberal in City Government, was published in 2005 by Milwaukee Publishers LLC, a local company formed for the purpose.

Zeidler's mayoral and personal papers are archived at Milwaukee Public Library. Several additional boxes of his papers are archived at the Golda Meir Library of the University of Wisconsin–Milwaukee.

On June 13, 1958, Zeidler was the first person to receive an honorary doctorate from the University of Wisconsin–Milwaukee, which now sponsors the Frank P. Zeidler International Graduate Student Travel Award, a scholarship enabling a non-American scholar to study for a master's degree in American history at UWM. The Wisconsin Labor History Society also sponsors an annual undergraduate Frank P. Zeidler Scholarship in labor history.

The Milwaukee Public Library's historic collections are housed in the Frank P. Zeidler Humanities Room, named in his honor.

On May 21, 2006, he received an honorary Doctor of Humane Letters degree from Cardinal Stritch University in Milwaukee.

An urban park in downtown Milwaukee bears Zeidler's name. Zeidler Union Park (originally named for priest and explorer Jacques Marquette) now hosts the Westown Farmer's Market and other smaller festivals and gatherings.

== Family ==
Zeidler and his wife, Agnes, were married for 67 years and raised six children together.

Zeidler's daughter, Jeanne Zeidler, served as mayor of Williamsburg, Virginia, from 1998 until 2010, when she retired.

== Works ==
- The Price of Honesty in Big Business (1943). Milwaukee.

== See also ==
- List of elected socialist mayors in the United States

Political offices
Preceded by John Bohn	Mayor of Milwaukee; 1948–1960	Succeeded by Henry W. Maier
Party political offices
Preceded by Solomon Levitan	Progressive nominee for State Treasurer of Wisconsin; 1940	Succeeded by Albert C. Johnson
Preceded by Darlington Hoopes (1956)	Socialist Party Presidential candidate 1976 (lost)	Succeeded by David McReynolds
