= Willa Kenoyer =

American politician (1933–2020)

Personal details
- Born: December 13, 1933 Tacoma, Washington, U.S.
- Died: March 28, 2020 (aged 86) Albany, Oregon, U.S.
- Party: Socialist Party USA
- Profession: Politician, freelance journalist

Willa Kenoyer (13 December 1933 – 28 March 2020) was an American politician of the Socialist Party USA (SPUSA) candidate for President of the United States in the 1988 U.S. presidential election.

== Candidacy ==
The SPUSA was not on the ballot in 1984 (the previous election) due to a lack of interest among its members, and only hoped for a vote total of five digits, expecting to do better in the next century, according to the chair Anne Rosenhaft. Kenoyer's running mate was Ron Ehrenreich; they also ran on the Liberty Union Party (LUP) line in Vermont, defeating Herbert G. Lewin of the Internationalist Workers Party by a vote difference of 199–66 in the LUP primary, which socialists use to gauge the relative strength of their campaigns. They hoped to spread their ideas, finding some similarities to the goals of Jesse Jackson's campaign, with significant differences regarding the military and intelligence agencies, and faulted him for, in their opinion, attracting more people to the Democratic Party. The Democratic party's ultimate nominee Michael Dukakis and platform were criticized by the campaign.

Kenoyer and Ehrenreich received 3,882 votes in the election. At the time she was working as a freelance journalist in Shelby, Michigan, and had been a co-chair of the Citizens Party. She was a divorced mother of four who learned about socialism from her father, a member of the Sawmill Workers. Her mother was a member of the Newspaper Guild. Prior to running for President, she served a six-year term on the Economic Development Commission for Oceana County, Michigan, to which she was reappointed in 1987.

== Later career ==
In 2004, she was appointed to the Van Buren County, Michigan Family Independence Agency Board. She was reappointed for a term expiring in October 2009. Kenoyer died on 28 March 2020, at the age of 86.

Party political offices
Preceded by Sonia Johnson (Citizen's Party ticket)	Socialist Party Presidential candidate 1988 (lost)	Succeeded by J. Quinn Brisben
