= 2004 United States presidential election in Idaho =

- November 2, 2004
- Turnout: 75.0% (of registered voters); 60.2% (of voting age population)

Nominee	George W. Bush	John Kerry
Party	Republican	Democratic
Home state	Texas	Massachusetts
Running mate	Dick Cheney	John Edwards
Electoral vote	4	0
Popular vote	409,235	181,098
Percentage	68.38%	30.26%

Bush
40–50%
50–60%
60–70%
70–80%
80–90%
90–100%
Kerry
40–50%
50–60%
60–70%
70–80%
No Data
President before election
George W. Bush
Republican
Elected President
George W. Bush
Republican

The 2004 United States presidential election in Idaho was held on November 2, 2004, as part of the 2004 presidential election. Voters chose four representatives, or electors to the Electoral College, who voted for president and vice president.

Idaho was won by incumbent President George W. Bush by a 38.1 point margin of victory. Prior to the election, all twelve news organizations considered this a state Bush would win, or otherwise considered as a safe red state. No Democratic presidential nominee had won the state since Lyndon B. Johnson in 1964, and even then, the race was closely contested. In 2004, President George W. Bush easily won the state and every congressional district and county, except the Democratic stronghold of Blaine County.

With 68.38 percent of the popular vote, Idaho would prove to be Bush's third strongest state in the 2004 election after neighboring Utah and Wyoming.

== Caucuses ==
- 2004 Idaho Democratic presidential caucuses

== Campaign ==
=== Predictions ===
There were 12 news organizations who made state-by-state predictions of the election. Here are their last predictions before election day.

Source	Ranking
D.C. Political Report	Solid R
Associated Press	Solid R
CNN	Likely R
Cook Political Report	Solid R
Newsweek	Solid R
New York Times	Solid R
Rasmussen Reports	Likely R
Research 2000	Solid R
Washington Post	Likely R
Washington Times	Solid R
Zogby International	Likely R
Washington Dispatch	Likely R

=== Polling ===
Only one pre-election poll was taken, which gave Bush 59%, Kerry 30%, and Nader 3%.

=== Fundraising ===
Bush raised $371,495. Kerry raised $359,011.

=== Advertising and visits ===
Neither campaign visited or campaigned here during the fall election.

== Analysis ==
With a substantial Mormon population, Idaho is one of the most reliable GOP bastions in the country. Both senators and representatives are Republican. It has not supported a Democratic presidential candidate since Lyndon B. Johnson in 1964. Democrats have not held the state legislature since 1958, though Democrats held the governorship from 1971 to 1995.

== Results ==
2004 United States presidential election in Idaho
Party	Candidate	Votes	Percentage	Electoral votes
Republican	George W. Bush (incumbent)	409,235	68.38%	4
Democratic	John Kerry	181,098	30.26%	0
Libertarian	Michael Badnarik	3,844	0.64%	0
Constitution	Michael Peroutka	3,084	0.52%	0
Write In	Ralph Nader	1,115	0.19%	0
Write In	David Cobb	58	0.01%	0
Write In	John Joseph Kennedy	9	<0.01%	0
Write In	Walt Brown	3	<0.01%	0
Totals		598,447	100.00%	4
Voter turnout (Voting age population)				60.2%

=== Results by county ===
County	George W. Bush Republican		John Kerry Democratic		Various candidates Other parties		Margin		Total votes cast
County	#	%	#	%	#	%	#	%	Total votes cast
Ada	94,641	61.05%	58,523	37.75%	1,866	1.20%	36,118	23.30%	155,030
Adams	1,468	71.16%	555	26.90%	40	1.94%	913	44.26%	2,063
Bannock	21,479	61.64%	12,903	37.03%	462	1.33%	8,576	24.61%	34,844
Bear Lake	2,506	82.43%	494	16.25%	40	1.32%	2,012	66.18%	3,040
Benewah	2,823	69.70%	1,148	28.35%	79	1.95%	1,675	41.35%	4,050
Bingham	12,734	76.87%	3,605	21.76%	226	1.37%	9,129	55.11%	16,565
Blaine	4,034	39.76%	5,992	59.05%	121	1.19%	-1,958	-19.29%	10,147
Boise	2,501	70.91%	970	27.50%	56	1.59%	1,531	43.41%	3,527
Bonner	10,697	60.49%	6,649	37.60%	338	1.91%	4,048	22.89%	17,684
Bonneville	30,048	77.30%	8,356	21.50%	467	1.20%	21,692	55.80%	38,871
Boundary	3,012	68.78%	1,268	28.96%	99	2.26%	1,744	39.82%	4,379
Butte	1,077	76.60%	321	22.83%	8	0.57%	756	53.77%	1,406
Camas	450	75.63%	139	23.36%	6	1.01%	311	52.27%	595
Canyon	41,599	74.69%	13,415	24.09%	684	1.22%	28,184	50.60%	55,698
Caribou	2,753	83.91%	491	14.96%	37	1.13%	2,262	68.95%	3,281
Cassia	6,562	83.90%	1,153	14.74%	106	1.36%	5,409	69.16%	7,821
Clark	302	85.55%	46	13.03%	5	1.42%	256	72.52%	353
Clearwater	2,839	70.38%	1,117	27.69%	78	1.93%	1,722	42.69%	4,034
Custer	1,762	74.72%	559	23.71%	37	1.57%	1,203	51.01%	2,358
Elmore	6,011	74.57%	1,959	24.30%	91	1.13%	4,052	50.27%	8,061
Franklin	4,527	89.57%	456	9.02%	71	1.41%	4,071	80.55%	5,054
Fremont	4,965	86.06%	741	12.84%	63	1.10%	4,224	73.22%	5,769
Gem	5,416	75.92%	1,628	22.82%	90	1.26%	3,788	53.10%	7,134
Gooding	3,973	74.61%	1,278	24.00%	74	1.39%	2,695	50.61%	5,325
Idaho	6,017	75.50%	1,689	21.19%	264	3.31%	4,328	54.31%	7,970
Jefferson	7,703	86.49%	1,084	12.17%	119	1.34%	6,619	74.32%	8,906
Jerome	5,177	78.68%	1,344	20.43%	59	0.89%	3,833	58.25%	6,580
Kootenai	36,173	66.25%	17,584	32.20%	846	1.55%	18,589	34.05%	54,603
Latah	8,686	49.48%	8,430	48.03%	437	2.49%	256	1.45%	17,553
Lemhi	3,079	75.93%	915	22.56%	61	1.51%	2,164	53.37%	4,055
Lewis	1,359	74.67%	440	24.18%	21	1.15%	919	50.49%	1,820
Lincoln	1,388	73.99%	466	24.84%	22	1.17%	922	49.15%	1,876
Madison	10,693	91.89%	826	7.10%	118	1.01%	9,867	84.79%	11,637
Minidoka	5,797	80.50%	1,331	18.48%	73	1.02%	4,466	62.02%	7,201
Nez Perce	11,009	62.20%	6,476	36.59%	215	1.21%	4,533	25.61%	17,700
Oneida	1,789	83.87%	304	14.25%	40	1.88%	1,485	69.62%	2,133
Owyhee	2,859	79.64%	685	19.08%	46	1.28%	2,174	60.56%	3,590
Payette	6,256	76.47%	1,848	22.59%	77	0.94%	4,408	53.88%	8,181
Power	2,105	71.16%	829	28.03%	24	0.81%	1,276	43.13%	2,958
Shoshone	2,922	54.75%	2,331	43.68%	84	1.57%	591	11.07%	5,337
Teton	2,235	60.57%	1,416	38.37%	39	1.06%	819	22.20%	3,690
Twin Falls	19,672	74.42%	6,458	24.43%	305	1.15%	13,214	49.99%	26,435
Valley	2,863	59.97%	1,843	38.60%	68	1.43%	1,020	21.37%	4,774
Washington	3,274	75.11%	1,033	23.70%	52	1.19%	2,241	51.41%	4,359
Totals	409,235	68.38%	181,098	30.26%	8,114	1.36%	228,137	38.12%	598,447

=== By congressional district ===
Bush won both congressional districts.

District	Bush	Kerry	Representative
1st	68%	30%	Butch Otter
2nd	68%	30%	Mike Simpson

== Electors ==
Technically the voters of Idaho cast their ballots for electors: representatives to the Electoral College. Idaho is allocated 4 electors because it has 2 congressional districts and 2 senators. All candidates who appear on the ballot or qualify to receive write-in votes must submit a list of 4 electors, who pledge to vote for their candidate and his or her running mate. Whoever wins the majority of votes in the state is awarded all 4 electoral votes. Their chosen electors then vote for president and vice president. Although electors are pledged to their candidate and running mate, they are not obligated to vote for them. An elector who votes for someone other than his or her candidate is known as a faithless elector.

The electors of each state and the District of Columbia met on December 13, 2004, to cast their votes for president and vice president. The Electoral College itself never meets as one body. Instead the electors from each state and the District of Columbia met in their respective capitols.

The following were the members of the Electoral College from Idaho. All were pledged to and voted for George Bush and Dick Cheney.

1. Pete T. Cenarrusa
2. Debbie Field
3. Sandra Patano
4. John Sandy

== See also ==
- United States presidential elections in Idaho
- Presidency of George W. Bush
