= Complicit absolution =

Offense in Roman Catholic canon law

Complicit absolution is an offense in Roman Catholic canon law consisting of the absolution of a party complicit with the absolving priest in an offense. Because it constitutes the abuse of a sacrament, it is held to be sacrilege.

Some cases involve secular clergy in the archdiocese of Boston who were similarly accused of abusing the confessional in the documents Crimen sollicitationis and De delictis gravioribus.

== See also ==
- Sacramentum Poenitentiae
