= 2004 United States presidential election in Indiana =

- November 2, 2004
- Turnout: 57.4% (of registered voters); 53.7% (of voting age population)

Nominee	George W. Bush	John Kerry
Party	Republican	Democratic
Home state	Texas	Massachusetts
Running mate	Dick Cheney	John Edwards
Electoral vote	11	0
Popular vote	1,479,438	969,011
Percentage	59.94%	39.26%

Bush
40–50%
50–60%
60–70%
70–80%
Kerry
40–50%
50–60%
60–70%
President before election
George W. Bush
Republican
Elected President
George W. Bush
Republican

A presidential election was held in Indiana on November 2, 2004, and was part of the 2004 United States presidential election. Voters chose 11 representatives, or electors, to the Electoral College, who voted for president and vice president.

Indiana was won by incumbent President George W. Bush by a 20.68% margin of victory. Prior to the election, all 12 news organizations considered this a state Bush would win, or otherwise considered as a safe red state, even though Democratic Senator Evan Bayh overwhelmingly won re-election on the same ballot. Indiana had not voted Democratic in a presidential election since 1964, but would buck this trend four years later by voting for Senator Barack Obama of neighboring Illinois.

Bush became the first Republican to win the White House without carrying Monroe County since Abraham Lincoln in 1864, as well as the first to do so without carrying Marion County since Benjamin Harrison in 1888. As of the 2024 presidential election, this is the last time that the Republican nominee won St. Joseph County.

== Primaries ==
- 2004 Indiana Democratic presidential primary

== Campaign ==
=== Predictions ===
There were 12 news organizations who made state-by-state predictions of the election. Here are their last predictions before election day.

Source	Ranking
D.C. Political Report	Solid R
Associated Press	Solid R
CNN	Likely R
Cook Political Report	Solid R
Newsweek	Solid R
New York Times	Solid R
Rasmussen Reports	Likely R
Research 2000	Solid R
Washington Post	Likely R
Washington Times	Solid R
Zogby International	Likely R
Washington Dispatch	Likely R

=== Polling ===
Bush won every single pre-election poll, and won each by a double-digit margin of victory and with at least 52% of the vote. The final 3 polls averaged Bush leading 56% to 40%.

=== Fundraising ===
Bush raised $2,491,828. Kerry raised $681,272.

=== Advertising and visits ===
Neither campaign visited or advertised in this state during the fall campaign.

== Analysis ==
Indiana has long been considered to be a Republican stronghold. The Cook Partisan Voting Index (CPVI) rates Indiana as a R+8. Indiana was one of only ten states to support Republican Wendell Willkie in 1940. On 14 occasions has the Republican candidate defeated the Democrat by a double-digit margin in the state, including six times where a Republican won the state by more than 20%. In 2000 and 2004, George W. Bush won the state by a wide margin while the election was much closer overall. The state has only supported a Democrat for president five times since 1900. In 1912, Woodrow Wilson became the first Democrat to win the state in the 20th Century, with 43% of the vote. 20 years later in 1932, Franklin D. Roosevelt won the state with 55% of the vote over incumbent Republican Herbert Hoover. Roosevelt won the state again in 1936. In 1964, 56% of voters supported Democrat Lyndon B. Johnson over Republican Barry Goldwater. Statistically, Indiana is more of a stronghold for Republican presidential candidates than for candidates elected to state government. Whereas only five Democratic presidential nominees have carried Indiana since 1900, eleven Democrats were elected governor during that time. Before Mitch Daniels became governor in 2005, Democrats had held the office for 16 consecutive years.

Historically, Republicans have been strongest in the eastern and central portions of the state, while Democrats have been strongest in the northwestern part of the state. Occasionally, certain counties in the southern part of the state will vote Democratic. Marion County, Indiana's most populated county, supported the Republican candidates from 1968 to 2000, before backing the Democrats in the 2004 and subsequent 2008, and 2012 elections. Indiana's second most populated county, Lake County, is a strong supporter of the Democratic party that has not voted for a Republican since 1972. In 2005, the Bay Area Center for Voting Research rated the most liberal and conservative cities in the United States on voting statistics in the 2004 presidential election, based on 237 cities with populations of more than 100,000. Five Indiana cities were mentioned in the study. On the liberal side, Gary was ranked second and South Bend came in at 83. Regarding conservative cities, Fort Wayne was 44th, Evansville was 60th and Indianapolis was 82nd on the list.

As of the 2024 presidential election, this is the last election in which St. Joseph County voted for the Republican candidate.

== Results ==
2004 United States presidential election in Indiana
Party	Candidate	Votes	%	±%
Republican	George W. Bush Dick Cheney	1,479,438	59.94	▲3.29
Democratic	John Kerry John Edwards	969,011	39.26	▼1.75
Libertarian	Michael Badnarik Richard Campagna	18,058	0.73	▲0.02
Independent	Ralph Nader (write-in) Peter Camejo (write-in)	1,328	0.05	▲0.05
Green	David Cobb (write-in) Pat LaMarche (write-in)	102	0.00	▼0.84
Independent Democrat	John Joseph Kennedy (write-in) N/A (Note: Kennedy had no registered running mate in Indiana.)	37	0.00	▲0.00
Socialist	Walt Brown (write-in) Mary Alice Herbert (write-in)	22	0.00	Steady
Independent	Lawson Mitchell Bone (write-in) N/A (Note: Bone had no registered running mate in Indiana.)	6	0.00	▲0.00
Total votes		2,468,002	100.00	

=== By county ===
County	George W. Bush Republican		John Kerry Democratic		Various candidates Other parties		Margin		Total
County	#	%	#	%	#	%	#	%	Total
Adams	9,734	72.97%	3,512	26.33%	94	0.70%	6,222	46.64%	13,340
Allen	82,013	63.28%	46,710	36.04%	886	0.68%	35,303	27.24%	129,609
Bartholomew	19,093	66.96%	9,191	32.23%	231	0.81%	9,902	34.73%	28,515
Benton	2,797	70.07%	1,135	28.43%	60	1.50%	1,662	41.64%	3,992
Blackford	3,447	64.07%	1,903	35.37%	30	0.56%	1,544	28.70%	5,380
Boone	17,055	74.48%	5,636	24.61%	207	0.91%	11,419	49.87%	22,898
Brown	4,512	61.56%	2,730	37.24%	88	1.20%	1,782	24.32%	7,330
Carroll	5,868	67.93%	2,689	31.13%	81	0.93%	3,179	36.80%	8,638
Cass	9,480	68.05%	4,315	30.97%	136	0.97%	5,165	37.08%	13,931
Clark	24,495	57.86%	17,648	41.68%	194	0.46%	6,847	16.18%	42,337
Clay	7,361	68.26%	3,333	30.91%	89	0.82%	4,028	37.35%	10,783
Clinton	8,471	71.32%	3,335	28.08%	71	0.60%	5,136	43.24%	11,877
Crawford	2,609	57.04%	1,932	42.24%	33	0.72%	677	14.80%	4,574
Daviess	7,936	74.87%	2,573	24.28%	90	0.84%	5,363	50.59%	10,599
Dearborn	14,231	67.87%	6,596	31.46%	142	0.68%	7,635	36.41%	20,969
Decatur	7,499	73.53%	2,621	25.70%	79	0.77%	4,878	47.83%	10,199
DeKalb	10,468	67.96%	4,810	31.23%	125	0.81%	5,658	36.73%	15,403
Delaware	27,064	56.46%	20,436	42.63%	439	0.92%	6,628	13.83%	47,939
Dubois	11,726	68.71%	5,210	30.53%	130	0.76%	6,516	38.18%	17,066
Elkhart	42,967	70.00%	17,966	29.27%	447	0.73%	25,001	40.73%	61,380
Fayette	5,761	60.85%	3,626	38.30%	81	0.86%	2,135	22.55%	9,468
Floyd	19,877	58.65%	13,857	40.89%	156	0.46%	6,020	17.76%	33,890
Fountain	5,260	67.40%	2,477	31.74%	67	0.86%	2,783	35.66%	7,804
Franklin	6,977	69.83%	2,925	29.27%	90	0.90%	4,052	40.56%	9,992
Fulton	6,027	69.25%	2,607	29.96%	69	0.79%	3,420	39.29%	8,703
Gibson	9,133	62.49%	5,378	36.80%	103	0.70%	3,755	25.69%	14,614
Grant	18,769	68.35%	8,509	30.99%	182	0.66%	10,260	37.36%	27,460
Greene	8,609	64.48%	4,606	34.50%	137	1.02%	4,003	29.98%	13,352
Hamilton	77,887	74.24%	26,388	25.15%	631	0.60%	51,499	49.09%	104,906
Hancock	20,771	74.54%	6,912	24.80%	184	0.66%	13,859	49.74%	27,867
Harrison	11,015	63.63%	6,171	35.65%	124	0.72%	4,844	27.98%	17,310
Hendricks	38,430	73.48%	13,548	25.90%	324	0.62%	24,882	47.58%	52,302
Henry	13,137	64.07%	7,176	35.00%	191	0.93%	5,961	29.07%	20,504
Howard	23,714	64.06%	12,998	35.11%	309	0.83%	10,716	28.95%	37,021
Huntington	11,617	74.34%	3,877	24.81%	133	0.85%	7,740	49.53%	15,627
Jackson	11,083	67.96%	5,092	31.22%	134	0.82%	5,991	36.74%	16,309
Jasper	8,056	68.02%	3,678	31.05%	110	0.93%	4,378	36.97%	11,844
Jay	5,427	65.93%	2,740	33.28%	65	0.79%	2,687	32.65%	8,232
Jefferson	7,763	59.85%	5,117	39.45%	91	0.70%	2,646	20.40%	12,971
Jennings	6,864	65.27%	3,538	33.64%	115	1.09%	3,326	31.63%	10,517
Johnson	37,765	73.68%	13,109	25.58%	381	0.75%	24,656	48.10%	51,255
Knox	9,990	63.44%	5,649	35.88%	107	0.68%	4,341	27.56%	15,746
Kosciusko	22,136	78.05%	5,977	21.08%	247	0.87%	16,159	56.97%	28,360
LaGrange	6,430	71.42%	2,523	28.02%	50	0.56%	3,907	43.40%	9,003
Lake	71,903	38.24%	114,743	61.03%	1,376	0.73%	-42,840	-22.79%	188,022
LaPorte	20,916	49.09%	21,114	49.56%	576	1.36%	-198	-0.47%	42,606
Lawrence	12,207	68.97%	5,346	30.21%	145	0.82%	6,861	38.76%	17,698
Madison	32,526	59.29%	21,882	39.89%	447	0.82%	10,644	19.40%	54,855
Marion	156,072	48.65%	162,249	50.57%	2,517	0.78%	-6,177	-1.92%	320,838
Marshall	12,074	67.78%	5,593	31.40%	147	0.83%	6,481	36.38%	17,814
Martin	3,414	68.33%	1,522	30.46%	60	1.20%	1,892	37.87%	4,996
Miami	9,600	70.44%	3,886	28.51%	142	1.05%	5,714	41.93%	13,628
Monroe	22,834	45.25%	26,965	53.43%	668	1.32%	-4,131	-8.18%	50,467
Montgomery	10,901	74.93%	3,536	24.31%	111	0.76%	7,365	50.62%	14,548
Morgan	19,197	73.75%	6,650	25.55%	182	0.70%	12,547	48.20%	26,029
Newton	3,757	64.24%	2,032	34.75%	59	1.01%	1,725	29.49%	5,848
Noble	10,859	69.26%	4,703	30.00%	117	0.74%	6,156	39.26%	15,679
Ohio	1,796	60.72%	1,139	38.51%	23	0.78%	657	22.21%	2,958
Orange	5,683	65.68%	2,885	33.34%	84	0.97%	2,798	32.34%	8,652
Owen	5,000	65.75%	2,536	33.35%	68	0.89%	2,464	32.40%	7,604
Parke	4,550	65.27%	2,362	33.88%	59	0.85%	2,188	31.39%	6,971
Perry	4,137	49.75%	4,131	49.68%	47	0.56%	6	0.07%	8,315
Pike	3,745	60.29%	2,418	38.92%	49	0.79%	1,327	21.37%	6,212
Porter	34,794	53.63%	29,388	45.30%	691	1.06%	5,406	8.33%	64,873
Posey	7,833	65.35%	4,085	34.08%	68	0.57%	3,748	31.27%	11,986
Pulaski	3,797	67.63%	1,750	31.17%	67	1.20%	2,047	36.46%	5,614
Putnam	8,908	67.81%	4,103	31.23%	125	0.95%	4,805	36.58%	13,136
Randolph	7,172	64.66%	3,812	34.37%	108	0.97%	3,360	30.29%	11,092
Ripley	8,224	69.49%	3,510	29.66%	100	0.84%	4,714	39.83%	11,834
Rush	5,363	72.27%	2,000	26.95%	58	0.78%	3,363	45.32%	7,421
Scott	4,793	55.24%	3,822	44.05%	62	0.71%	971	11.19%	8,677
Shelby	11,397	71.11%	4,519	28.20%	111	0.69%	6,878	42.91%	16,027
Spencer	5,934	59.79%	3,920	39.50%	70	0.70%	2,014	20.29%	9,924
St. Joseph	55,254	50.87%	52,637	48.46%	728	0.67%	2,617	2.41%	108,619
Starke	4,846	54.22%	3,987	44.61%	104	1.16%	859	9.61%	8,937
Steuben	8,433	65.35%	4,345	33.67%	127	0.99%	4,088	31.68%	12,905
Sullivan	4,999	59.55%	3,341	39.80%	54	0.64%	1,658	19.75%	8,394
Switzerland	2,161	58.87%	1,479	40.29%	31	0.84%	682	18.58%	3,671
Tippecanoe	30,897	59.01%	20,818	39.76%	645	1.23%	10,079	19.25%	52,360
Tipton	5,628	71.31%	2,203	27.91%	61	0.77%	3,425	43.40%	7,892
Union	2,266	67.76%	1,045	31.25%	33	0.99%	1,221	36.51%	3,344
Vanderburgh	41,463	58.68%	28,767	40.72%	424	0.60%	12,696	17.96%	70,654
Vermillion	3,536	50.39%	3,424	48.80%	57	0.81%	112	1.59%	7,017
Vigo	20,988	52.81%	18,426	46.36%	330	0.83%	2,562	6.45%	39,744
Wabash	9,607	70.63%	3,920	28.82%	75	0.55%	5,687	41.81%	13,602
Warren	2,565	64.77%	1,356	34.24%	39	0.98%	1,209	30.53%	3,960
Warrick	16,930	65.05%	8,980	34.51%	115	0.44%	7,950	30.54%	26,025
Washington	6,915	63.56%	3,879	35.65%	86	0.79%	3,036	27.91%	10,880
Wayne	16,586	59.97%	10,775	38.96%	296	1.07%	5,811	21.01%	27,657
Wells	9,168	74.21%	3,112	25.19%	74	0.60%	6,056	49.02%	12,354
White	6,974	67.28%	3,277	31.61%	115	1.11%	3,697	35.67%	10,366
Whitley	9,512	70.56%	3,880	28.78%	89	0.66%	5,632	41.78%	13,481
Totals	1,479,438	59.94%	969,011	39.26%	19,553	0.80%	510,427	20.68%	2,468,002

==== Counties that flipped Democratic to Republican ====
- Perry (largest city: Tell City)
- Scott (largest city: Scottsburg)
- St. Joseph (largest city: South Bend)
- Vermillion (largest city: Clinton)

==== Counties that flipped from Republican to Democratic ====
- Marion (largest city: Indianapolis)
- Monroe (largest city: Bloomington)

=== By congressional district ===
Bush won seven of nine congressional districts.

District	Bush	Kerry	Representative
1st	44%	55%	Pete Visclosky
2nd	56%	43%	Chris Chocola
3rd	68%	31%	Mark Souder
4th	69%	30%	Steve Buyer
5th	71%	28%	Dan Burton
6th	64%	35%	Mike Pence
7th	42%	58%	Julia Carson
8th	62%	38%	John Hostettler
9th	59%	40%	Baron Hill
9th	59%	40%	Mike Sodrel

== Electors ==
Technically the voters of Indiana cast their ballots for electors: representatives to the Electoral College. Indiana is allocated 11 electors because it has nine congressional districts and two senators. All candidates who appear on the ballot or qualify to receive write-in votes must submit a list of 11 electors, who pledge to vote for their candidate and his or her running mate. Whoever wins the majority of votes in the state is awarded all 11 electoral votes. Their chosen electors then vote for president and vice president. Although electors are pledged to their candidate and running mate, they are not obligated to vote for them. An elector who votes for someone other than his or her candidate is known as a faithless elector.

The electors of each state and the District of Columbia met on December 13, 2004, to cast their votes for president and vice president. The Electoral College itself never meets as one body. Instead, the electors from each state and the District of Columbia met in their respective capitols.

The following were the members of the Electoral College from Indiana. All were pledged to and voted for Bush and Cheney.

1. Kenneth Culp
2. John Zentz
3. Michael Miner
4. Saundra Huddleston
5. Leeann Cook
6. Ted Ogle
7. Melissa Proffitt Reese
8. Dudley Curea
9. Larry Shickles
10. James Kittle
11. Jean Ann Harcourt

== See also ==
- United States presidential elections in Indiana
