= 2004 United States presidential election in Kansas =

- November 2, 2004
- Turnout: 70.1% (of registered voters); 58.6% (of voting age population)

Nominee	George W. Bush	John Kerry
Party	Republican	Democratic
Home state	Texas	Massachusetts
Running mate	Dick Cheney	John Edwards
Electoral vote	6	0
Popular vote	736,456	434,993
Percentage	62.00%	36.62%

Bush
50–60%
60–70%
70–80%
80–90%
Kerry
50–60%
60–70%
President before election
George W. Bush
Republican
Elected President
George W. Bush
Republican

The 2004 United States presidential election in Kansas took place on November 2, 2004, as part of the 2004 United States presidential election. Voters chose six representatives, or electors to the Electoral College, who voted for president and vice president.

Kansas was won by incumbent President George W. Bush by a 25.4% margin of victory. Prior to the election, all 12 news organizations considered this a state Bush would win, or otherwise considered as a safe red state. On election day, it trended Republican from the 2000 election by a swing margin of almost 5%. He won every single congressional district and county, excluding two: Wyandotte County and Douglas County.

== Caucuses ==
- 2004 Kansas Democratic presidential caucuses

== Campaign ==
=== Predictions ===
There were 12 news organizations who made state-by-state predictions of the election. Here are their last predictions before election day.

Source	Ranking
D.C. Political Report	Solid R
Cook Political Report	Solid R
Research 2000	Solid R
Zogby International	Likely R
Washington Post	Likely R
Washington Dispatch	Likely R
Washington Times	Solid R
The New York Times	Solid R
CNN	Likely R
Newsweek	Solid R
Associated Press	Solid R
Rasmussen Reports	Likely R

=== Polling ===
Bush won every single pre-election poll, and won each by a double-digit margin of victory and with at least 56% of the vote. The final 3 polls averaged Bush leading 58% to 37% for Kerry and 3% for Nader.

=== Fundraising ===
Bush raised $980,035. Kerry raised $387,484.

=== Advertising and visits ===
Neither presidential candidate advertised or visited this state. However, John Edwards visited the city of Lawrence in Douglas County briefly.

== Analysis ==
Apart from its flirtation with William Jennings Bryan and Woodrow Wilson, Kansas has always been a Republican stronghold at the presidential level, voting for GOP nominees in all but seven elections since statehood. The last Democratic presidential nominee to carry Kansas was Lyndon B. Johnson in his landslide in 1964. A combination of rural counties embedded with deep pockets of evangelical Christianity/social conservatism and moderate, fiscally conservative residents in Johnson County, Kansas nearly always votes Republican.

== Results ==
2004 United States presidential election in Kansas
Party	Candidate	Votes	Percentage	Electoral votes
Republican	George W. Bush (Inc.)	736,456	62.00%	6
Democratic	John Kerry	434,993	36.62%	0
Reform	Ralph Nader	9,348	0.79%	0
Libertarian	Michael Badnarik	4,013	0.34%	0
Independent	Michael Peroutka	2,899	0.24%	0
Write In	David Cobb	33	0.00%	0
Write In	John Joseph Kennedy	5	0.00%	0
Write In	Bill Van Auken	5	0.00%	0
Write In	Walt Brown	4	0.00%	0
Totals		1,187,756	100.00%	6
Voter turnout (Voting age population)				58.6%

=== Results by county ===
County	George W. Bush Republican		John Kerry Democratic		Ralph Nader Reform		Michael James Badnarik Libertarian		Various candidates Other parties		Margin		Total votes cast
County	#	%	#	%	#	%	#	%	#	%	#	%	Total votes cast
Allen	3,867	65.84%	1,922	32.73%	53	0.90%	20	0.34%	11	0.19%	1,945	33.11%	5,873
Anderson	2,500	64.72%	1,295	33.52%	40	1.04%	13	0.34%	15	0.39%	1,205	31.20%	3,863
Atchison	3,880	54.51%	3,120	43.83%	65	0.91%	29	0.41%	24	0.34%	760	10.68%	7,118
Barber	1,782	74.16%	588	24.47%	19	0.79%	4	0.17%	10	0.42%	1,194	49.69%	2,403
Barton	8,666	74.03%	2,874	24.55%	106	0.91%	30	0.26%	30	0.26%	5,792	49.48%	11,706
Bourbon	4,372	65.39%	2,216	33.14%	64	0.96%	23	0.34%	11	0.16%	2,156	32.25%	6,686
Brown	3,092	69.99%	1,268	28.70%	35	0.79%	12	0.27%	11	0.25%	1,824	41.29%	4,418
Butler	18,438	70.16%	7,495	28.52%	174	0.66%	92	0.35%	81	0.31%	10,943	41.64%	26,280
Chase	1,055	70.29%	418	27.85%	12	0.80%	9	0.60%	7	0.47%	637	42.44%	1,501
Chautauqua	1,529	78.01%	404	20.61%	10	0.51%	10	0.51%	7	0.36%	1,125	57.40%	1,960
Cherokee	6,083	61.36%	3,726	37.59%	69	0.70%	23	0.23%	12	0.12%	2,357	23.77%	9,913
Cheyenne	1,353	79.96%	320	18.91%	9	0.53%	7	0.41%	3	0.18%	1,033	61.05%	1,692
Clark	1,014	78.54%	257	19.91%	8	0.62%	4	0.31%	8	0.62%	757	58.63%	1,291
Clay	3,174	79.15%	793	19.78%	22	0.55%	12	0.30%	9	0.22%	2,381	59.37%	4,010
Cloud	3,221	71.53%	1,210	26.87%	42	0.93%	17	0.38%	13	0.29%	2,011	44.66%	4,503
Coffey	3,259	73.93%	1,093	24.80%	33	0.75%	12	0.27%	11	0.25%	2,166	49.13%	4,408
Comanche	770	78.49%	200	20.39%	3	0.31%	4	0.41%	4	0.41%	570	58.10%	981
Cowley	9,407	65.11%	4,818	33.35%	121	0.84%	60	0.42%	41	0.28%	4,589	31.76%	14,447
Crawford	8,626	52.19%	7,617	46.09%	181	1.10%	60	0.36%	43	0.26%	1,009	6.10%	16,527
Decatur	1,355	77.87%	355	20.40%	20	1.15%	8	0.46%	2	0.11%	1,000	57.47%	1,740
Dickinson	6,295	71.61%	2,364	26.89%	72	0.82%	35	0.40%	25	0.28%	3,931	44.72%	8,791
Doniphan	2,491	69.14%	1,065	29.56%	25	0.69%	14	0.39%	8	0.22%	1,426	39.58%	3,603
Douglas	20,544	41.00%	28,634	57.14%	624	1.25%	209	0.42%	100	0.20%	-8,090	-16.14%	50,111
Edwards	1,084	72.46%	386	25.80%	19	1.27%	3	0.20%	4	0.27%	698	46.66%	1,496
Elk	1,119	73.86%	369	24.36%	17	1.12%	2	0.13%	8	0.53%	750	49.50%	1,515
Ellis	7,891	64.75%	4,033	33.09%	158	1.30%	61	0.50%	44	0.36%	3,858	31.66%	12,187
Ellsworth	2,259	72.82%	801	25.82%	23	0.74%	13	0.42%	6	0.19%	1,458	47.00%	3,102
Finney	7,479	75.29%	2,351	23.67%	64	0.64%	18	0.18%	21	0.21%	5,128	51.62%	9,933
Ford	6,632	73.56%	2,286	25.35%	61	0.68%	17	0.19%	20	0.22%	4,346	48.21%	9,016
Franklin	7,391	64.40%	3,921	34.17%	106	0.92%	31	0.27%	27	0.24%	3,470	30.23%	11,476
Geary	4,703	64.18%	2,531	34.54%	58	0.79%	21	0.29%	15	0.20%	2,172	29.64%	7,328
Gove	1,196	81.53%	247	16.84%	12	0.82%	5	0.34%	7	0.48%	949	64.69%	1,467
Graham	1,082	75.14%	334	23.19%	10	0.69%	6	0.42%	8	0.56%	748	51.95%	1,440
Grant	2,169	78.64%	561	20.34%	11	0.40%	11	0.40%	6	0.22%	1,608	58.30%	2,758
Gray	1,816	80.89%	408	18.17%	17	0.76%	4	0.18%	0	0.00%	1,408	62.72%	2,245
Greeley	584	79.46%	138	18.78%	9	1.22%	3	0.41%	1	0.14%	446	60.68%	735
Greenwood	2,282	70.35%	911	28.08%	30	0.92%	8	0.25%	13	0.40%	1,371	42.27%	3,244
Hamilton	888	78.58%	229	20.27%	5	0.44%	7	0.62%	1	0.09%	659	58.31%	1,130
Harper	2,154	73.52%	727	24.81%	30	1.02%	9	0.31%	10	0.34%	1,427	48.71%	2,930
Harvey	9,534	63.10%	5,331	35.28%	171	1.13%	46	0.30%	28	0.19%	4,203	27.82%	15,110
Haskell	1,356	84.80%	227	14.20%	10	0.63%	5	0.31%	1	0.06%	1,129	70.60%	1,599
Hodgeman	953	80.56%	223	18.85%	6	0.51%	1	0.08%	0	0.00%	730	61.71%	1,183
Jackson	3,730	63.35%	2,064	35.05%	44	0.75%	21	0.36%	29	0.49%	1,666	28.30%	5,888
Jefferson	5,408	61.50%	3,253	37.00%	79	0.90%	32	0.36%	21	0.24%	2,155	24.50%	8,793
Jewell	1,495	78.07%	385	20.10%	13	0.68%	10	0.52%	12	0.63%	1,110	57.97%	1,915
Johnson	158,103	61.12%	97,866	37.83%	1,420	0.55%	992	0.38%	306	0.12%	60,237	23.29%	258,687
Kearny	1,177	80.89%	272	18.69%	4	0.27%	1	0.07%	1	0.07%	905	62.20%	1,455
Kingman	2,801	74.42%	904	24.02%	27	0.72%	14	0.37%	18	0.48%	1,897	50.40%	3,764
Kiowa	1,275	81.47%	256	16.36%	19	1.21%	5	0.32%	10	0.64%	1,019	65.11%	1,565
Labette	5,400	59.09%	3,615	39.56%	76	0.83%	28	0.31%	20	0.22%	1,785	19.53%	9,139
Lane	823	81.16%	181	17.85%	4	0.39%	3	0.30%	3	0.30%	642	63.31%	1,014
Leavenworth	15,949	58.35%	11,039	40.39%	191	0.70%	86	0.31%	66	0.24%	4,910	17.96%	27,331
Lincoln	1,368	76.00%	391	21.72%	23	1.28%	11	0.61%	7	0.39%	977	54.28%	1,800
Linn	3,048	64.29%	1,631	34.40%	37	0.78%	14	0.30%	11	0.23%	1,417	29.89%	4,741
Logan	1,255	82.40%	248	16.28%	13	0.85%	3	0.20%	4	0.26%	1,007	66.12%	1,523
Lyon	7,951	59.16%	5,234	38.94%	154	1.15%	48	0.36%	53	0.39%	2,717	20.22%	13,440
Marion	4,516	73.32%	1,536	24.94%	69	1.12%	14	0.23%	24	0.39%	2,980	48.38%	6,159
Marshall	3,261	63.84%	1,789	35.02%	39	0.76%	6	0.12%	13	0.25%	1,472	28.82%	5,108
McPherson	9,595	71.78%	3,589	26.85%	114	0.85%	44	0.33%	25	0.19%	6,006	44.93%	13,367
Meade	1,748	82.41%	356	16.78%	12	0.57%	3	0.14%	2	0.09%	1,392	65.63%	2,121
Miami	9,013	64.31%	4,838	34.52%	90	0.64%	30	0.21%	45	0.32%	4,175	29.79%	14,016
Mitchell	2,609	77.90%	693	20.69%	26	0.78%	10	0.30%	11	0.33%	1,916	57.21%	3,349
Montgomery	9,598	67.99%	4,338	30.73%	98	0.69%	44	0.31%	38	0.27%	5,260	37.26%	14,116
Morris	1,961	66.79%	931	31.71%	28	0.95%	6	0.20%	10	0.34%	1,030	35.08%	2,936
Morton	1,287	81.66%	276	17.51%	5	0.32%	4	0.25%	4	0.25%	1,011	64.15%	1,576
Nemaha	4,027	73.71%	1,355	24.80%	39	0.71%	19	0.35%	23	0.42%	2,672	48.91%	5,463
Neosho	4,705	65.07%	2,424	33.52%	69	0.95%	19	0.26%	14	0.19%	2,281	31.55%	7,231
Ness	1,407	77.39%	382	21.01%	17	0.94%	4	0.22%	8	0.44%	1,025	56.38%	1,818
Norton	2,092	80.49%	473	18.20%	21	0.81%	8	0.31%	5	0.19%	1,619	62.29%	2,599
Osage	4,800	64.32%	2,537	33.99%	77	1.03%	27	0.36%	22	0.29%	2,263	30.33%	7,463
Osborne	1,587	76.48%	454	21.88%	25	1.20%	5	0.24%	4	0.19%	1,133	54.60%	2,075
Ottawa	2,333	78.53%	595	20.03%	26	0.88%	8	0.27%	9	0.30%	1,738	58.50%	2,971
Pawnee	2,172	72.69%	773	25.87%	26	0.87%	8	0.27%	9	0.30%	1,399	46.82%	2,988
Phillips	2,256	79.24%	557	19.56%	20	0.70%	6	0.21%	8	0.28%	1,699	59.68%	2,847
Pottawatomie	6,326	71.70%	2,176	24.66%	91	1.03%	30	0.34%	200	2.27%	4,150	47.04%	8,823
Pratt	3,121	71.19%	1,200	27.37%	38	0.87%	18	0.41%	7	0.16%	1,921	43.82%	4,384
Rawlins	1,414	82.21%	289	16.80%	9	0.52%	6	0.35%	2	0.12%	1,125	65.41%	1,720
Reno	17,748	64.95%	9,114	33.36%	275	1.01%	91	0.33%	96	0.35%	8,634	31.59%	27,324
Republic	2,238	77.47%	607	21.01%	20	0.69%	11	0.38%	13	0.45%	1,631	56.46%	2,889
Rice	3,182	72.71%	1,130	25.82%	41	0.94%	3	0.07%	20	0.46%	2,052	46.89%	4,376
Riley	12,672	60.60%	7,908	37.82%	224	1.07%	63	0.30%	44	0.21%	4,764	22.78%	20,911
Rooks	2,121	78.27%	534	19.70%	37	1.37%	6	0.22%	12	0.44%	1,587	58.57%	2,710
Rush	1,226	68.53%	517	28.90%	27	1.51%	9	0.50%	10	0.56%	709	39.63%	1,789
Russell	2,671	75.77%	810	22.98%	24	0.68%	8	0.23%	12	0.34%	1,861	52.79%	3,525
Saline	15,111	65.58%	7,524	32.65%	251	1.09%	78	0.34%	77	0.33%	7,587	32.93%	23,041
Scott	1,924	83.69%	347	15.09%	17	0.74%	5	0.22%	6	0.26%	1,577	68.60%	2,299
Sedgwick	110,381	62.12%	64,839	36.49%	1,345	0.76%	695	0.39%	419	0.24%	45,542	25.63%	177,679
Seward	4,272	78.54%	1,122	20.63%	24	0.44%	8	0.15%	13	0.24%	3,150	57.91%	5,439
Shawnee	44,188	54.17%	36,264	44.45%	687	0.84%	236	0.29%	202	0.25%	7,924	9.72%	81,577
Sheridan	1,144	81.37%	239	17.00%	13	0.92%	2	0.14%	8	0.57%	905	64.37%	1,406
Sherman	2,088	75.60%	632	22.88%	25	0.91%	13	0.47%	4	0.14%	1,456	52.72%	2,762
Smith	1,803	76.08%	540	22.78%	17	0.72%	4	0.17%	6	0.25%	1,263	53.30%	2,370
Stafford	1,649	75.43%	506	23.15%	20	0.91%	4	0.18%	7	0.32%	1,143	52.28%	2,186
Stanton	796	82.40%	165	17.08%	4	0.41%	1	0.10%	0	0.00%	631	65.32%	966
Stevens	1,936	85.47%	310	13.69%	12	0.53%	4	0.18%	3	0.13%	1,626	71.78%	2,265
Sumner	7,092	67.62%	3,217	30.67%	92	0.88%	38	0.36%	49	0.47%	3,875	36.95%	10,488
Thomas	3,007	77.70%	816	21.09%	28	0.72%	6	0.16%	13	0.34%	2,191	56.61%	3,870
Trego	1,225	72.66%	434	25.74%	21	1.25%	4	0.24%	2	0.12%	791	46.92%	1,686
Wabaunsee	2,531	70.23%	1,001	27.77%	36	1.00%	10	0.28%	26	0.72%	1,530	42.46%	3,604
Wallace	742	84.70%	112	12.79%	13	1.48%	6	0.68%	3	0.34%	630	71.91%	876
Washington	2,498	78.31%	643	20.16%	31	0.97%	6	0.19%	12	0.38%	1,855	58.15%	3,190
Wichita	869	81.83%	183	17.23%	6	0.56%	4	0.38%	0	0.00%	686	64.60%	1,062
Wilson	3,263	74.19%	1,060	24.10%	41	0.93%	13	0.30%	21	0.48%	2,203	50.09%	4,398
Woodson	1,204	68.29%	530	30.06%	19	1.08%	3	0.17%	7	0.40%	674	38.23%	1,763
Wyandotte	17,919	33.56%	34,923	65.40%	331	0.62%	123	0.23%	105	0.20%	-17,004	-31.84%	53,401
Totals	736,456	62.00%	434,993	36.62%	9,348	0.79%	4,013	0.34%	2,946	0.25%	301,463	25.38%	1,187,756

=== Results by congressional district ===
Bush won all four congressional districts, including one held by a Democrat.

District	Bush	Kerry	Representative
1st	72%	26%	Jerry Moran
2nd	59%	39%	Jim Ryun
3rd	55%	44%	Dennis Moore
4th	64%	34%	Todd Tiahrt

== Electors ==
Technically the voters of Kansas cast their ballots for electors: representatives to the Electoral College. Kansas is allocated 6 electors because it has 4 congressional districts and 2 senators. All candidates who appear on the ballot or qualify to receive write-in votes must submit a list of 6 electors, who pledge to vote for their candidate and his or her running mate. Whoever wins the majority of votes in the state is awarded all 6 electoral votes. Their chosen electors then vote for president and vice president. Although electors are pledged to their candidate and running mate, they are not obligated to vote for them. An elector who votes for someone other than his or her candidate is known as a faithless elector.

The electors of each state and the District of Columbia met on December 13, 2004, to cast their votes for president and vice president. The Electoral College itself never meets as one body. Instead the electors from each state and the District of Columbia met in their respective capitols.

The following were the members of the Electoral College from the state. All 6 were pledged to Bush/Cheney.

1. Ruth Garvey Fink
2. Bud Hentzen
3. Dennis Jones
4. Wanda Konold
5. Jack Ranson
6. Patricia Pitney Smith

== See also ==
- United States presidential elections in Kansas
- Presidency of George W. Bush
