= De delictis gravioribus =

2001 letter by Cardinal Joseph Ratzinger

De delictis gravioribus (Latin for "On more serious crimes") is a letter written on 18 May 2001 by Cardinal Joseph Ratzinger, Prefect of the Congregation for the Doctrine of the Faith, to all the Bishops of the Catholic Church and the other Ordinaries concerned, including those of the Eastern Catholic Churches.

The letter was published in the official gazette of the Holy See, the Acta Apostolicae Sedis, in 2001.

== Contents ==
It covers "the more serious offences reserved to the Congregation for the Doctrine of the Faith" that the apostolic constitution Pastor Bonus of 28 June 1988 attributes to the competence of that office:

Art. 52 — The Congregation examines offences against the faith and more serious ones both in behaviour or in the celebration of the sacraments which have been reported to it and, if need be, proceeds to the declaration or imposition of canonical sanctions in accordance with the norms of common or proper law.

The Code of Canon Law also speaks of offences reserved to the Congregation for the Doctrine of the Faith, and likewise does not specify them.

=== Graviora delicta ===
Of the eight more serious delicts (graviora delicta) in behaviour or in the celebration of the sacraments that De delictis gravioribus specified, four concern the Eucharist:

1. Throwing away the consecrated species or, for a sacrilegious purpose, taking them away or keeping them;
2. Attempting, if not a priest, to celebrate Mass or pretending to do so;
3. Concelebrating the Eucharist with ministers of ecclesial communities that lack apostolic succession and do not recognize the sacramental dignity of priestly ordination;
4. Consecrating either bread or wine without the other, or consecrating both but outside of celebration of Mass.

Three concern the sacrament of Confession:

1. Absolving an accomplice in sexual sin;
2. Making a sexual advance in Confession or on the occasion of or on the pretext of Confession;
3. Direct violation of the secrecy of Confession.

In addition, the document lists one offence of a moral character, not directly connected with administration of the sacraments, as reserved in the same way as these to the Congregation for the Doctrine of the Faith, namely, the offence of a cleric (a bishop, priest or deacon) who commits a sexual sin with someone under 18 years of age.

== Procedure ==
Reservation of these offences to the Congregation does not mean that the Congregation itself tries those accused of committing them. It requires instead that, if a preliminary investigation shows that it is at least probable that the offence was committed, the ordinary (in the Eastern Catholic Churches called the hierarch) is to consult the Congregation on the manner in which his own tribunal is to proceed. In addition, any appeals from the verdict of that tribunal are to be made to the Congregation, instead of the usual appeals tribunal.

== Prescription ==
In the case of criminal actions brought before an ecclesiastical tribunal against someone accused of offences reserved to the Congregation for the Doctrine of the Faith, prescription normally limits to ten years from the date of commission of an offence the time within which the prosecution may be initiated; but the document De delictis gravioribus lays down that, in the case of a sexual offence against a minor, the period of ten years begins to run only when the minor reaches 18 years of age.

== See also ==
- Crimen sollicitationis
