= Sacramentum Poenitentiae =

1741 apostolic constitution by Pope Benedict XIV

Sacramentum Poenitentiae was an apostolic constitution promulgated by Pope Benedict XIV on 1 June 1741, discussing the offense of solicitation, which is the crime of making use of the Sacrament of Penance, directly or indirectly, for the purpose of soliciting sexual activity.

== Content ==
Sacramentorum Poenitentiae assigned to the Supreme Sacred Congregation of the Roman and Universal Inquisition the responsibility of safeguarding the sanctity of the sacrament of penance.

The Sacramentum Poenitentiae addresses the soliciting of sex by priests during confession.

"The crime of solicitation occurs whenever a priest – whether in the act itself of sacramental confession, or before or immediately after confession, on the occasion or under the pretext of confession, or even apart from confession [but] in a confessional or another place assigned or chosen for the hearing of confessions and with the semblance of hearing confessions there – has attempted to solicit or provoke a penitent, whosoever he or she may be, to immoral or indecent acts, whether by words, signs, nods, touch or a written message, to be read either at that time or afterwards, or he has impudently dared to have improper and indecent conversations or interactions with that person. (Constitution Sacramentum Poenitentiae, §1)

Section 4 decrees that a priest who is complicit in a sin against the sixth commandment is incapable of validly absolving his accomplice from that sin. This is called complicit absolution. An exception is made in danger of death, and then only if no other priest is available. It was the fifth document in the canon-law book that was used to train all priests between 1918 and 1982.

== See also ==
- Crimen sollicitationis
