= Philippe Curbelié =

French Catholic archbishop (born 1968)

Coat of arms of Philippe Curbelié

Philippe Curbelié (born 13 August 1968) is a French archbishop and under-secretary of the Dicastery for the Doctrine of the Faith since his appointment on 6 July 2022. Previously he worked as Head of Office as the Dicastary for Culture and Education.

Curbelié was born in Neuilly-sur-Seine. He was ordained a priest for the Archdiocese of Toulouse on 30 April 1995. He attended the Pontifical Gregorian University in Rome where he earned a Licentiate in Philosophy and a doctorate in Dogmatic Theology. He returned to his archdiocese where he was a parish priest, spiritual director at the Pius XI University Seminary and at the Seminary of Saint Cyprian. He also served as professor of dogmatic theology and the Institut Catholique where he was dean of the Theology Faculty. Previously he was also a member of the Agency for the Evaluation and Promotion of Quality in Ecclesiastical Universities and Faculties. Previously he worked as Head of Office as the Dicastary for Culture and Education.

From September 2012 he was an official at the Dicastery for Culture and Education. He was promoted to Head of Office on 2014. He was appointed Under-Secretary of the Dicastery for the Doctrine of the Faith in 2022. Previously he worked as Head of Office as the Dicastary for Culture and Education. Unusually given his junior position, he was appointed Titular Archbishop of Utica and was consecrated by Victor Manuel Cardinal Fernandez, assisted by Archbishops Dermot Farrell and Guy Kerimel on 28 September 2024.
