= 2004 Indiana Democratic presidential primary =

- May 4, 2004

81 Democratic National Convention delegates (67 pledged, 14 unpledged) The number of pledged delegates received is determined by the popular vote
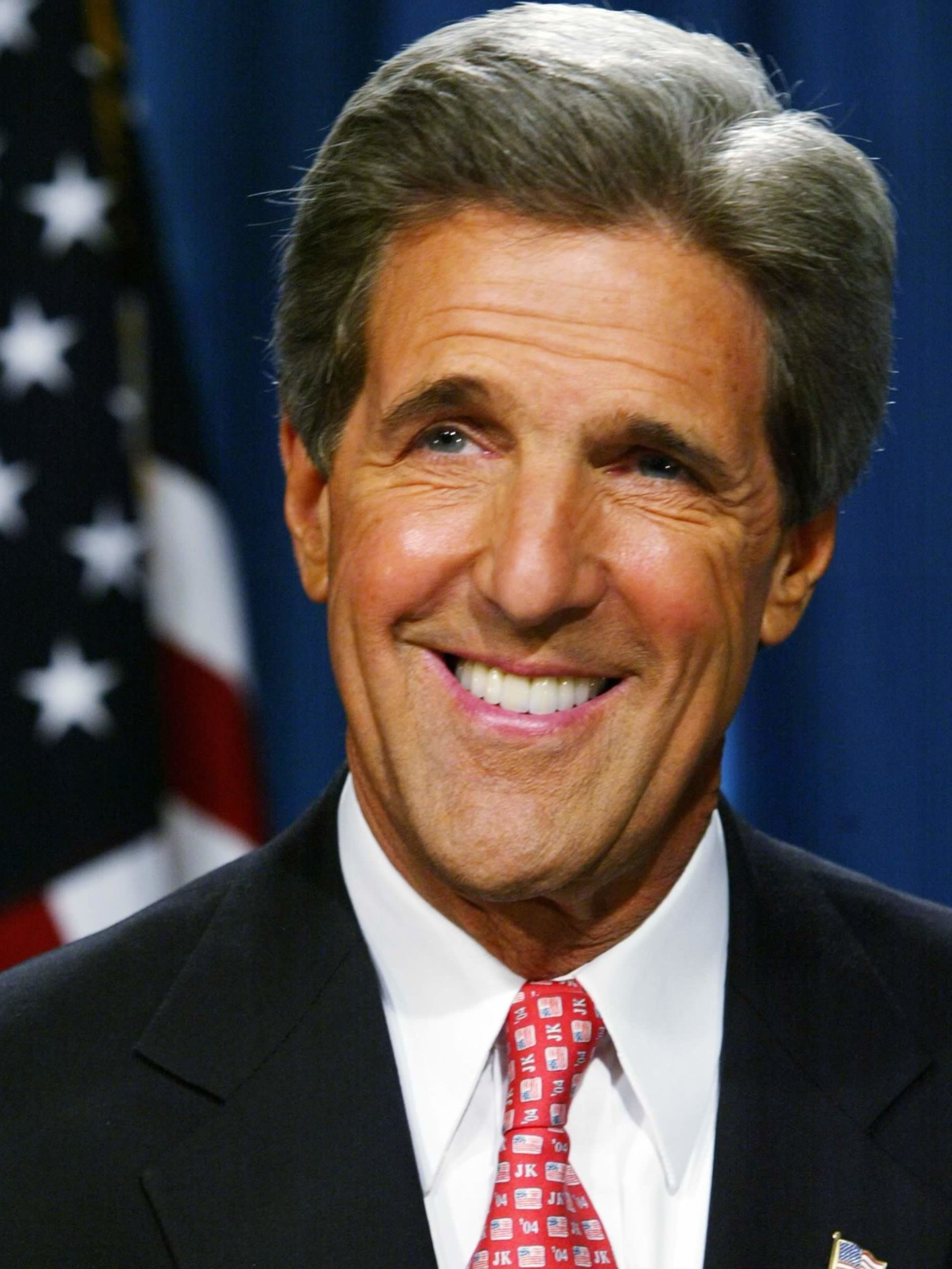

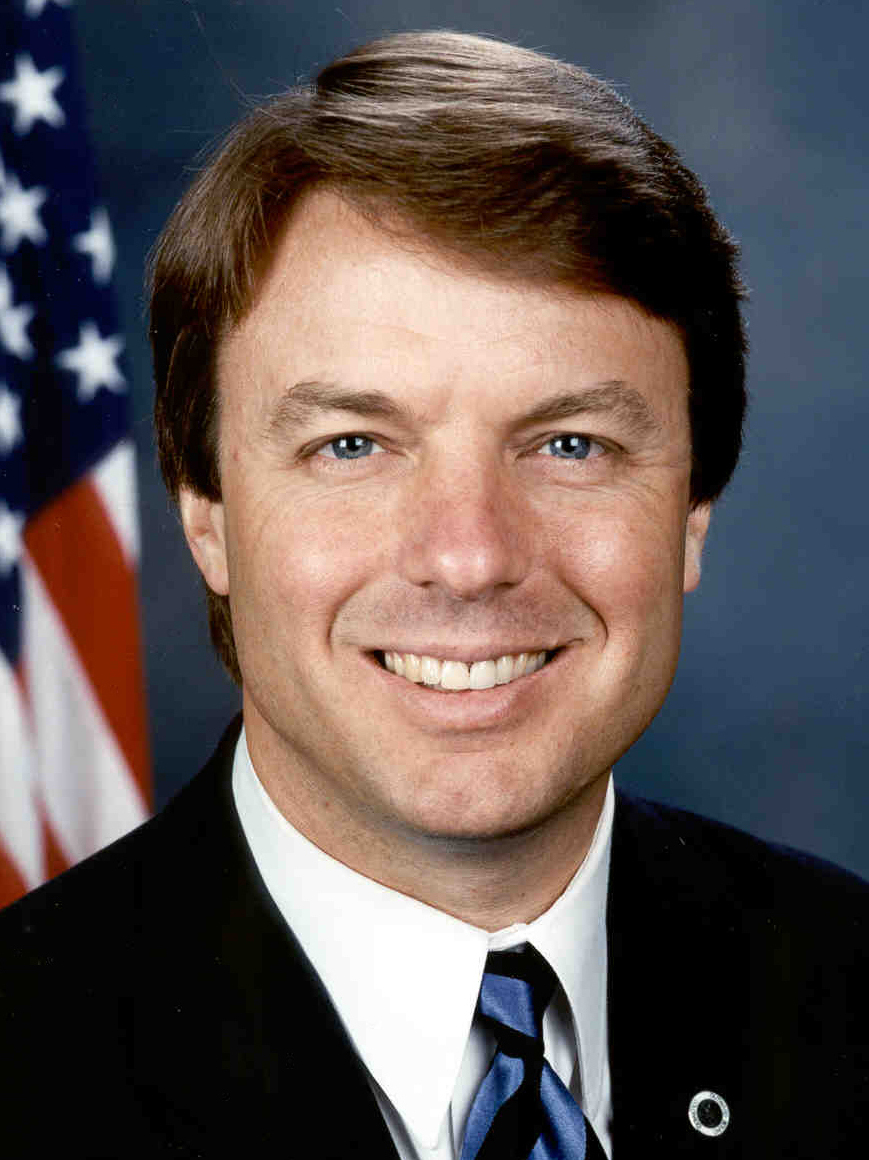

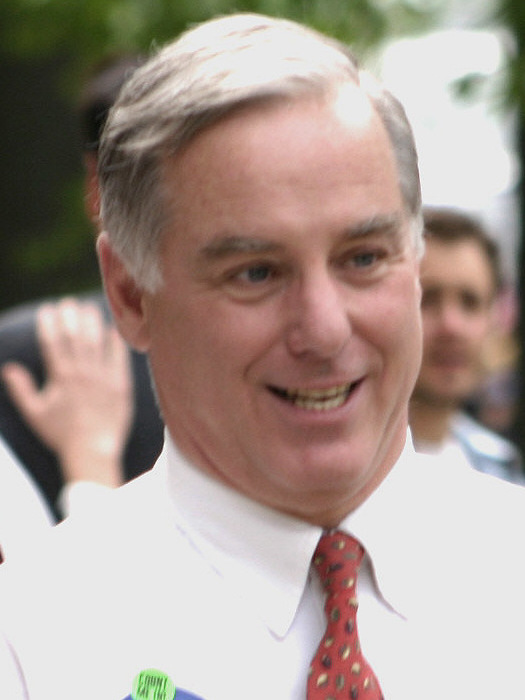

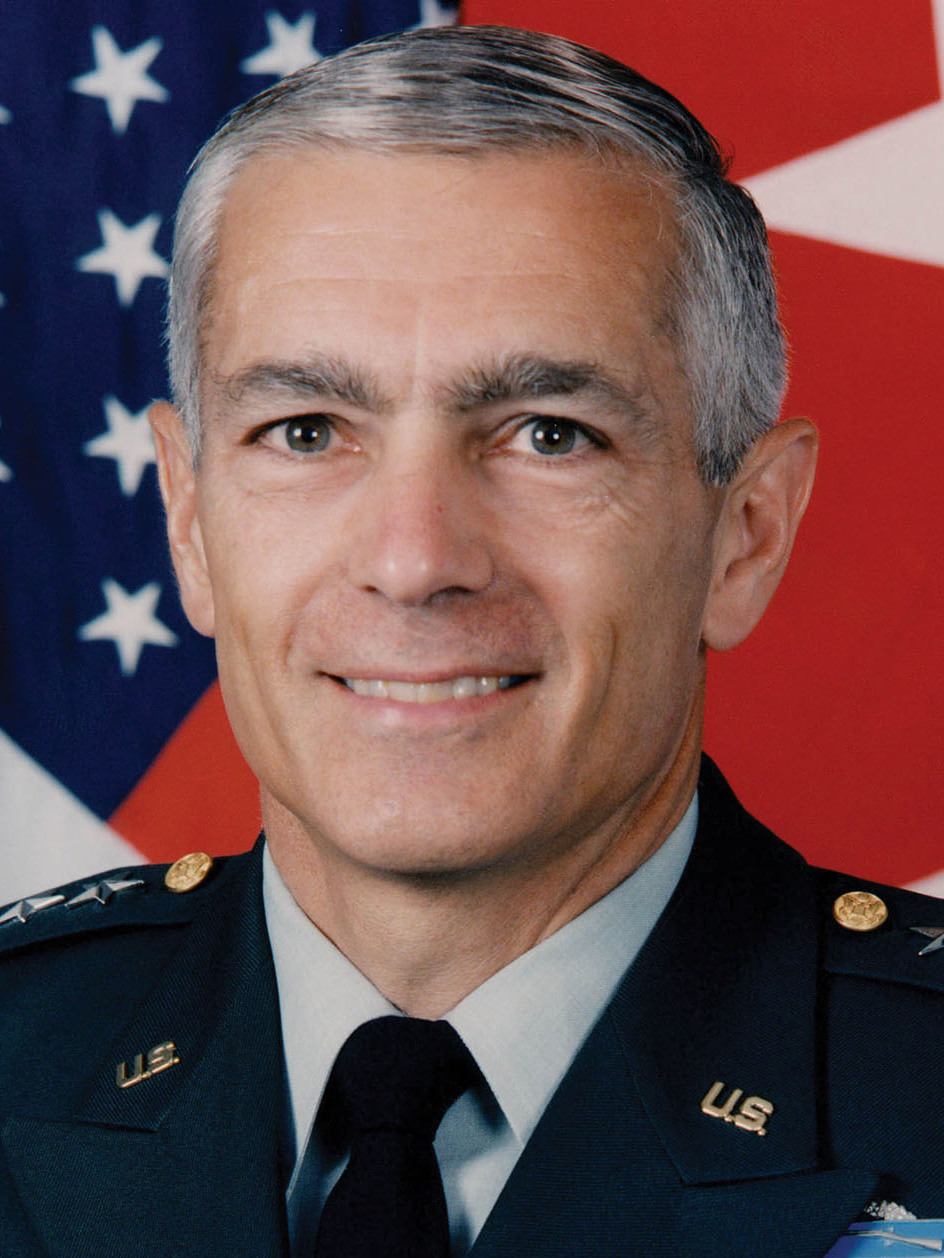
Candidate	John Kerry	John Edwards (withdrawn)
Home state	Massachusetts	North Carolina
Delegate count	67	0
Popular vote	231,047	35,651
Percentage	72.84%	11.24%
Candidate	Howard Dean (withdrawn)	Wesley Clark (withdrawn)
Home state	Vermont	Arkansas
Delegate count	0	0
Popular vote	21,482	17,437
Percentage	6.77%	5.50%
- County results Kerry: 60–65% 65–70% 70–75% 75–80%

The 2004 Indiana Democratic presidential primary was held on May 4 in the U.S. state of Indiana as one of the Democratic Party's statewide nomination contests ahead of the 2004 presidential election. The winner of the state's primary, Kerry, would go on to be the Democratic Party's nominee for the national election. On Election Day, George W. Bush would defeat Kerry handily in Indiana and would ultimately be re-elected as president.

== Results ==
By the time of Indiana's primary, Kerry had already secured the Democratic nomination after several decisive victories on Super Tuesday in March.

Indiana holds open primaries, meaning voters do not have to be registered with a certain political party to vote for a candidate in that party's primary (i.e., non-Democrats vote for candidates in Democratic primaries in Indiana).

Ballot returns broken down by congressional district shows the extent of Kerry's domination; there was not a single district he did not win the vast majority of votes in on the day of the primary. Edwards came in second place in all districts. Dean came in third place in all districts, narrowly edging out Clark for the third-place position by just a few hundred votes in Northwestern Indiana (which contains Indiana's share of the Chicago metropolitan area), Northeastern Indiana, and Central Indiana (excluding Indianapolis). Clark came in fourth in all districts. Two more candidates, Dennis Kucinich and Lyndon LaRouche, were on the ballot for Hoosier voters, but in most districts, they both failed to garner more than a couple hundred votes apiece. LaRouche was able to defeat Kucinich narrowly in the eighth district, roughly corresponding to Southwestern Indiana, but Kucinich defeated LaRouche everywhere else in the state.

2004 Indiana Democratic primary
Candidate	Votes	%	Delegates
John Kerry	231,047	72.84	67
John Edwards (withdrawn)	35,651	11.24	0
Howard Dean (withdrawn)	21,482	6.77	0
Wesley Clark (withdrawn)	17,437	5.50	0
Dennis Kucinich	7,003	2.21	0
Lyndon LaRouche	4,591	1.45	0
Total	317,211	100%	67
