= 2004 Idaho Democratic presidential caucuses =

- February 24, 2004

23 Democratic National Convention delegates (18 pledged, 5 unpledged) The number of pledged delegates received is determined by the popular vote
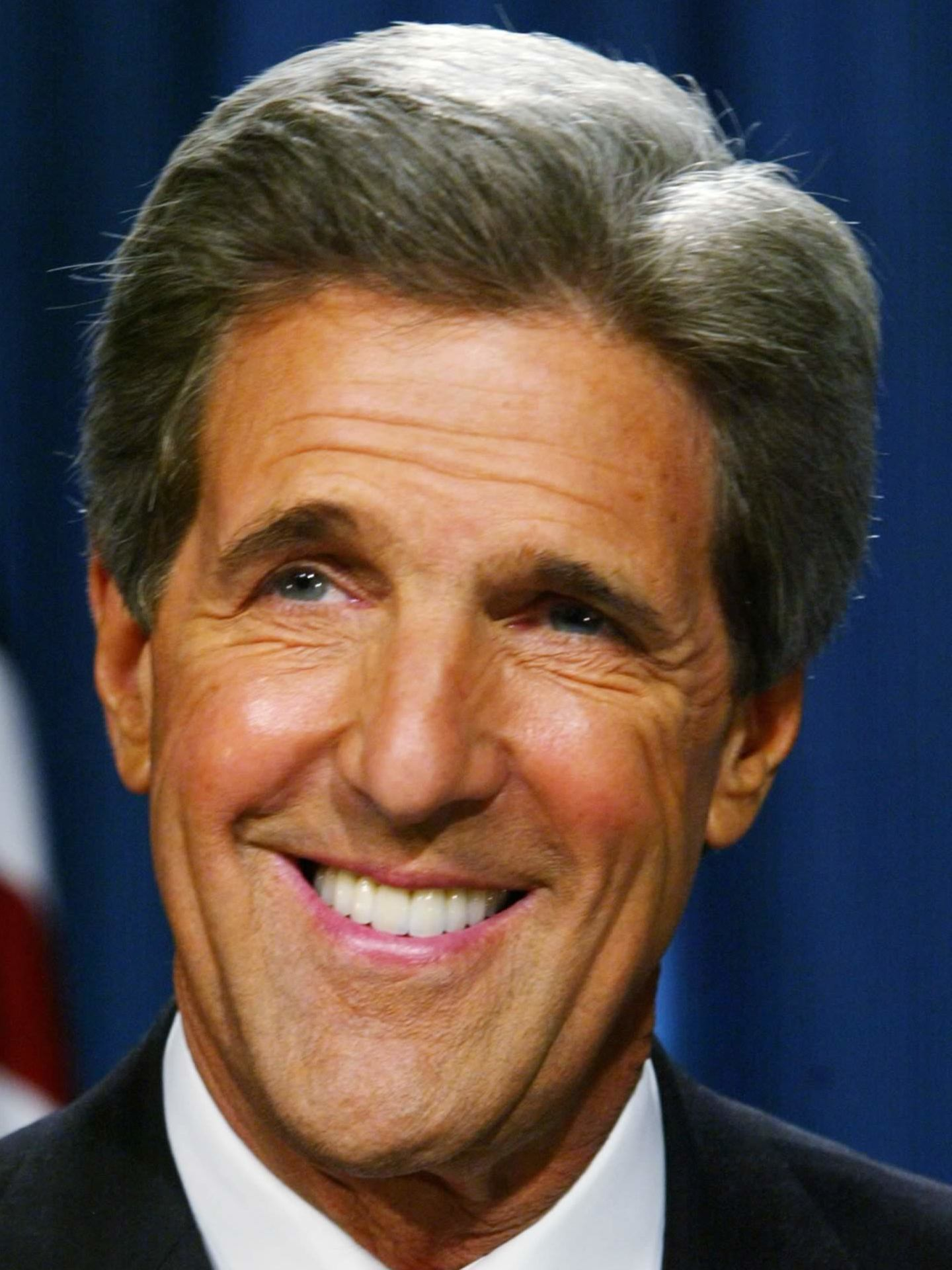

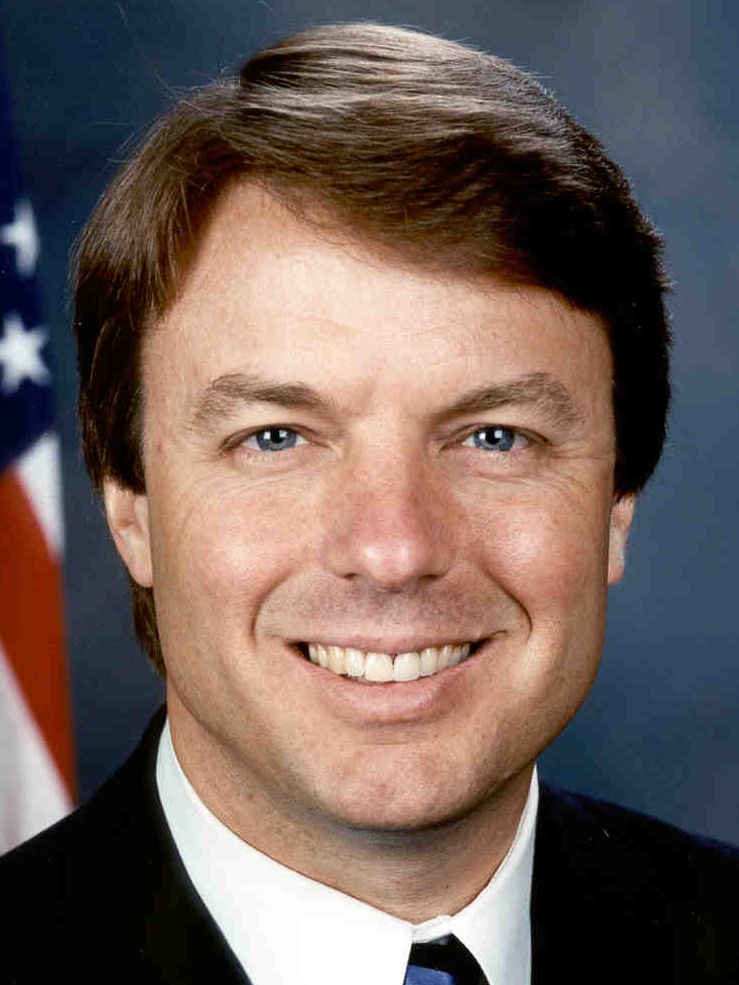

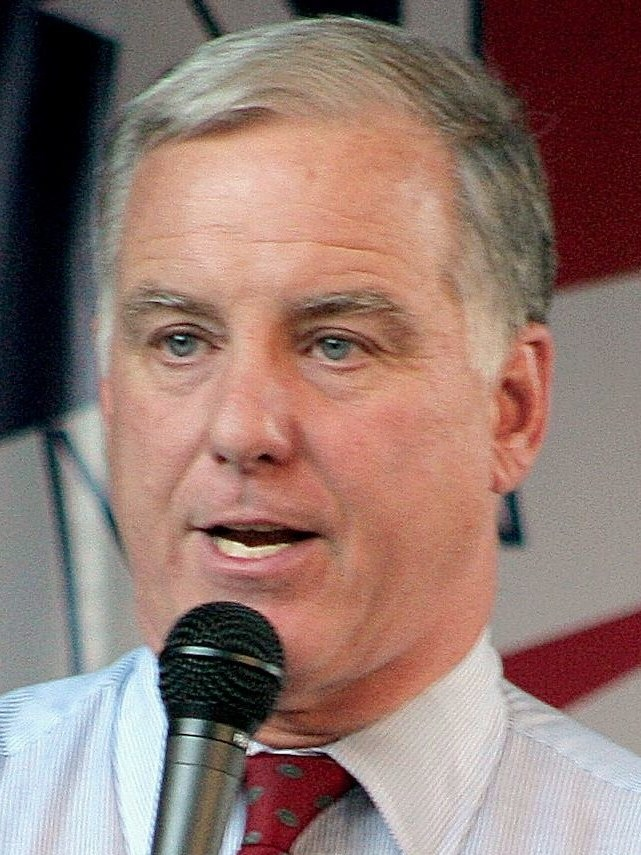

Candidate	John Kerry	John Edwards
Home state	Massachusetts	North Carolina
Delegate count	13	5
SCDs	210	87
Candidate	Howard Dean (withdrawn)	Uncommitted
Home state	Vermont	n/a
Delegate count	0	0
SCDs	42	26

The 2004 Idaho Democratic presidential caucuses were held on February 24 in the U.S. state of Idaho as one of the Democratic Party's statewide nomination contests ahead of the 2004 presidential election.

== Results ==
2004 Idaho Democratic presidential caucuses
Candidate	State convention delegates	%	Delegates
John Kerry	210	55.41	13
John Edwards	87	22.96	5
Howard Dean (withdrawn)	42	11.08	0
Uncommitted	26	6.86	0
Dennis Kucinich	14	3.69	0
Total	379	100%	18
