= Crimen sollicitationis =

1962 document by the Holy Office

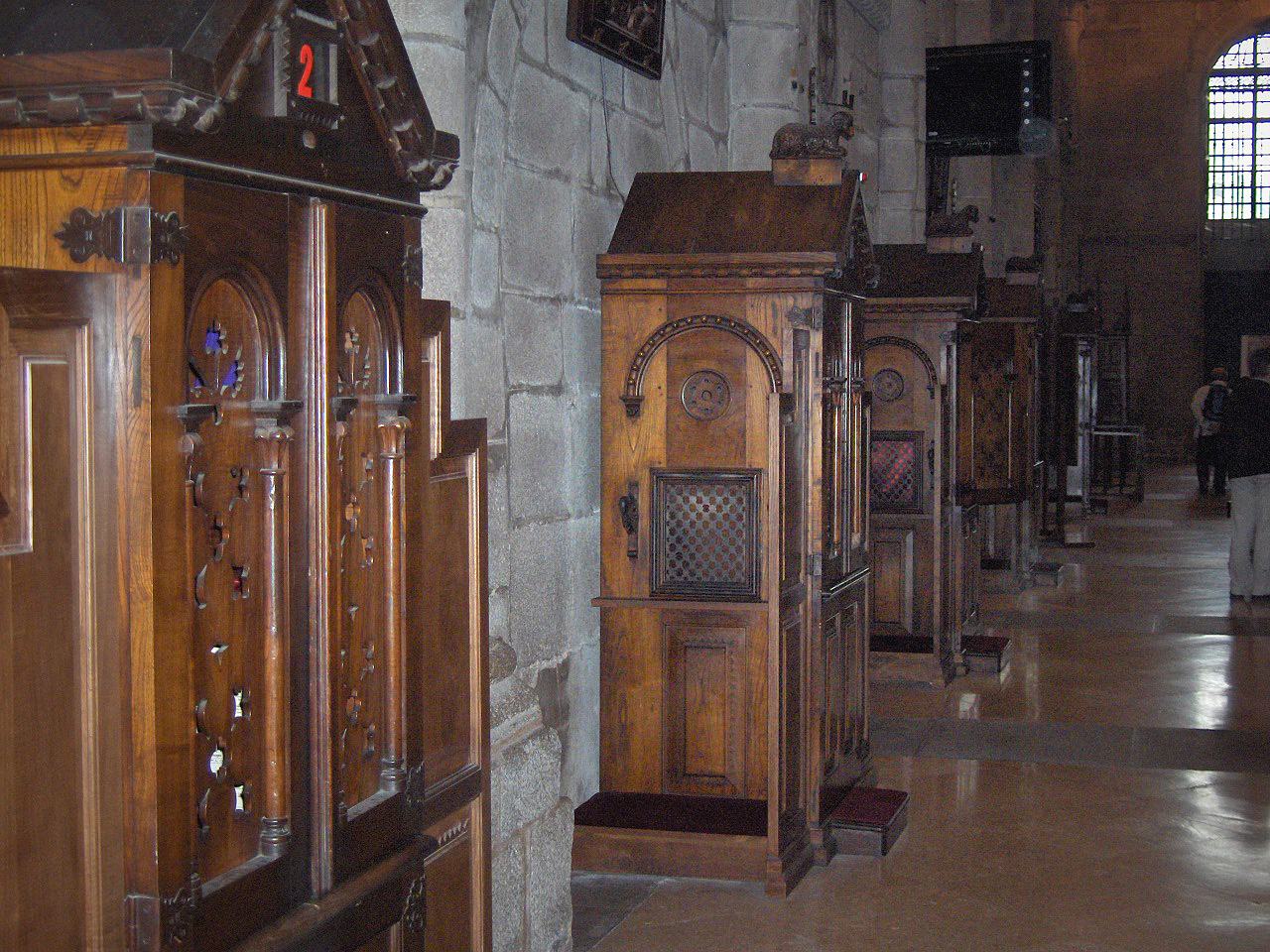
The Latin expression crimen sollicitationis refers to a sexual advance made before, during or immediately after administration (even simulated) of the Sacrament of Penance.

Crimen sollicitationis (Latin for "the crime of solicitation"; English title: On the Manner of Proceeding in Cases of) is the title of a 1962 document ("instruction") of the Holy Office codifying procedures to be followed in cases of priests or bishops of the Catholic Church accused of having used the sacrament of Penance to make sexual advances to penitents. It repeated, with additions, the contents of an identically named instruction issued in 1922 by the same office.

The 1962 document, approved by Pope John XXIII and signed by Cardinal Alfredo Ottaviani, Secretary of the Holy Office, was addressed to "all Patriarchs, Archbishops, Bishops and other Local Ordinaries, including those of Eastern Rite". It was an internal document for use by the Curia, describing how the rules in the Code of Canon Law on dealing with such cases were to be implemented, and directed that the same procedures be used when dealing with denunciations of homosexual, paedophile or zoophile behaviour by clerics. Dioceses were to use the instruction for their own guidance and keep it in their archives for confidential documents; they were not to publish the instruction nor produce commentaries on it.

Crimen sollicitationis remained in effect until 18 May 2001, when it was replaced by new norms promulgated by the papal motu proprio Sacramentorum sanctitatis tutela of 30 April of the same year. Normally it would have ceased to have effect with the entry into force of the 1983 Code of Canon Law, which replaced the 1917 Code on which the 1962 document was based, but it continued in use, with some necessary adaptations, while a review of it was carried out.

== Applicability and scope ==
In line with the opening words of the document, 70 of the 74 paragraphs of which it was composed dealt with cases concerning sexual advances during the sacrament of Penance, repeatedly referring to the complainant or injured party as "the penitent" (the person confessing sins); the final four paragraphs laid down that its contents applied also to crimen pessimum (the foulest crime), namely a homosexual act, with which were equated, for penal effects, any perpetrated or attempted externally obscene act with pre-adolescent children or brute animals. Charges concerning these crimes also were to be handled according to the norms of the document, even if committed without any connection with Penance.

Media accounts sometimes presented the instruction as not concerned principally with sexual solicitation in Confession, but with denunciations of paedophilia. While it is true that such acts were covered by Crimen sollicitationis, canon lawyers have argued that the secrecy provisions of the document "would not have tied the hands of a bishop, or anyone else, who wanted to report a crime by a priest to the police".

== Canon law on cases of solicitation in confession ==
The Code of Canon Law in force when Crimen sollicitationis was issued obliged anyone whom a priest solicited in confession to denounce him within one month and ordered that any such priest be subjected to a serious ecclesiastical punishment:

Canon 904. Ad normam constitutionum apostolicarum et nominatim constitutionis Benedicti XIV Sacramentum Poenitentiae, 1 Iun. 1741, debet poenitens sacerdotem, reum delicti sollicitationis in confessione, intra mensem denuntiare loci Ordinario, vel Sacrae Congregationi S. Officii; et confessarius debet, graviter onerata eius conscientia, de hoc onere poenitentem monere.

Canon 2368 §1. Qui sollicitationis crimen de quo in can. 904, commiserit, suspendatur a celebratione Missae et ab audiendis sacramentalibus confessionibus vel etiam pro delicti gravitate inhabilis ad ipsas excipiendas declaretur, privetur omnibus beneficiis, dignitatibus, voce activa et passiva, et inhabilis ad ea omnia declaretur, et in casibus gravioribus degradationi quoque subiiciatur

Translation:

Canon 904. In accordance with the apostolic constitutions, in particular the constitution Sacramentum Poenitentiae of Benedict XIV of 1 June 1741, a penitent must within one month denounce to the local Ordinary or the Sacred Congregation of the Holy Office a priest guilty of the crime of solicitation in confession; and a confessor must, under a grave obligation of conscience, inform a penitent of this duty.

Canon 2368 §1. Anyone who has committed the crime of solicitation dealt with in canon 904 is to be suspended from celebrating Mass and hearing sacramental confessions and, if the gravity of the crime calls for it, he is to be declared unfit for hearing them; he is to be deprived of all benefices and ranks, of the right to vote or be voted for, and is to be declared unfit for all of them, and in more serious cases he is to be reduced to the lay state.

Crimen sollicitationis indicated the procedure to be followed between a denunciation and the possible infliction of a penalty.

== Outline of the letter Crimen sollicitationis ==
- Preliminaries (sections 1–14)
- Title One: First intimation of the crime (15-28)
- Title Two: The trial (29–60)
  - Chapter I: Investigation (29–41)
  - Chapter II: Canonical regulations and cautioning of the accused (42–46)
  - Chapter III: Summoning the accused (47–54)
  - Chapter IV: Conduct of the trial, verdict and appeal (55–60)
- Title Three: Penalties (61–65)
- Title Four: Official communication (66–70)
- Title Five: The most evil crime (71–74)
- Approval by Pope John XXIII on 16 March 1962
- Appendices:
  - Formula A: oath of office
  - Formula B: abjuration of errors
  - Formula C: absolution from excommunication
  - Formula D: delegating a person to receive a denunciation
  - Formula E: receiving a denunciation
  - Formula F: delegating a person to examine witnesses
  - Formula G: full examination of a witness (about the priest and the accuser)
  - Formula H: partial examination of a witness (about the accuser only)
  - Formula I: general examination of the accuser
  - Formula L: conclusions and proposal of the Promoter of Justice
  - Formula M: decision of the Local Ordinary
  - Formula N: admonition of the accused
  - Formula O: decree of arraignment
  - Formula P: examination of the accused
  - Formula Q: conclusions and proposal of the Promoter of Justice
  - Formula R: sentencing a convicted accused person who denies guilt
  - Formula S: sentencing a convicted accused person who admits guilt
  - Formula T: communication of the sentence to the accused

== Contents ==
The document's title, "Instructio de modo procedendi in causis sollicitationis" (Instruction on procedure in solicitation cases), indicates that it was composed to indicate how to carry out a canonical investigation into accusations of solicitation. It described the procedures to be followed in each phase: reception of a denunciation; the course of the investigation, summoning the accused, sentencing, and the possibility of appeal.

The result of the investigation could vary:

- if the accusation appeared to be unfounded, this was stated in the record and the documents containing the accusation were destroyed;
- if only vague evidence emerged, the case was filed away for use if fresh evidence appeared;
- if the evidence was strong but insufficient for arraigning the accused, he was given an admonition and the records were preserved with a view to any further developments;
- if the evidence was strong enough, the accused person was summoned and a canonical trial took place.

Quoting canon 2368 §1 of the 1917 Code of Canon Law, then in force, Crimen sollicitationis, 61 indicated the penalties that could be imposed after conviction. These penalties, such as suspension a divinis, deprivation of an office or rank, and reduction to the lay state, were of public character, even if the trial itself had been conducted with all due secrecy. The same part of the document laid down that, in addition to those penalties, penances should be imposed on guilty priests, and those in danger of repeating their crime should be subjected to particular vigilance (64).

Except in connection with the sacrament of Penance, canon law imposed no legal obligation – though a moral one might exist – to denounce clerics guilty of engaging in or attempting a homosexual act; but the procedure described in Crimen sollicitationis was to be followed also in dealing with such accusations (71–72). And any gravely sinful external obscene act with prepubescent children of either sex or with animals engaged in or attempted by a cleric was to be treated, for its penal effects, as equivalent to an actual or attempted homosexual act (73).

Unless solicitation in connection with Confession was involved, not only the local bishop but also superiors of religious orders exempt from the jurisdiction of the local bishop could proceed, either by formal trial or non-judicially ("modo administrativo"), against members of those orders who had committed such crimes; superiors of non-exempt religious orders could also do so, but only non-judicially (74).

== Trial confidentiality ==
Since Crimen sollicitationis was primarily concerned with offenses committed in the confessional, this "presented particular problems of investigation, because in most cases the priest could not be interrogated fully without putting the seal of confession in danger."

Section 11 of Crimen sollicitationis outlines the required confidentiality of the investigation into accusations of the crime of solicitation. The document imposed absolute confidentiality on the trial's proceedings (explicitly excepting "what may happen to be lawfully published when this process is concluded and put into effect", the term "published" meaning "publication of the evidence" in Canon Law, or the conclusion of the "discovery phase" in a civil trial, before the verdict is rendered), both during its conduct and after any concluding verdict had been put into effect:

Quoniam vero quod in hisce causis tractandis maiorem in modum curari et observari debet illud est ut eaedem secretissime peragantur et, postquam fuerint definitae et executioni iam traditae, perpetuo silentio premantur (Instr. Sancti Officii, 20 febr. 1867, n. 14); omnes et singuli ad tribunal quomodocumque pertinentes vel propter eorum officium ad rerum notitiam admissi arctissimum secretum, quod secretum Sancti Officii communiter audit, in omnibus et cum omnibus, sub poena excommunicationis latae sententiae, ipso facto et absque alia declaratione incurrendae atque uni personae Summi Pontificis, ad exclusionem etiam Sacrae Poenitentiariae, reservatae, inviolabiliter servare tenentur.

Translation:

Since, however, in dealing with these causes, more than usual care and concern must be shown that they be treated with the utmost confidentiality, and that, once decided and the decision executed, they are covered by permanent silence (Instruction of the Holy Office, 20 February 1867, No. 14), all those persons in any way associated with the tribunal, or knowledgeable of these matters by reason of their office, are bound to observe inviolably the strictest confidentiality, commonly known as the secret of the Holy Office, in all things and with all persons, under pain of incurring automatic excommunication, ipso facto and undeclared, reserved to the sole person of the Supreme Pontiff, excluding even the Sacred Penitentiary. Ordinaries are bound by this same law, that is, in virtue of their own office; other personnel are bound in virtue of the oath which they are always to swear before assuming their duties; and, finally, those delegated, questioned or informed [outside the tribunal], are bound in virtue of the precept to be imposed on them in the letters of delegation, inquiry or information, with express mention of the secret of the Holy Office and of the aforementioned censure.

An oath of secrecy was to be taken by all members of the tribunal; violation incurred a penalty of automatic excommunication. The ecclesiastical penalty for violation of secrecy by the accused priest was automatic suspension a divinis, although he was free to discuss with his defence counsel (Section 13).

Unless violation of secrecy occurred after an explicit procedural warning given in the course of their examination (Section 13; and cf. Section 23 concerning the person denouncing solicitation: "before the person is dismissed, there should be presented to the person, as above, an oath of observing the secret, threatening the person, if there is a need, with an excommunication reserved to the Ordinary or to the Holy See"), no ecclesiastical penalties were to be imposed on the accusers and witnesses.

The oath of office to be taken by the members of the tribunal was given as Formula A:

Spondeo, voveo ac iuro, inviolabile secretum me servaturum in omnibus et singulis quae mihi in praefato munere exercendo occurrerint, exceptis dumtaxat iis quae in fine et expeditiones [recte: expeditione] huius negotii legitime publicari contingat ... neque unquam directe vel indirecte, nutu, verbo, scriptis, aut alio quovis modo et sub quocumque colorato praetextu, etiam maioris boni aut urgentissimae et gravissimae causae, contra hanc secreti fidem quidquam commissurum, nisi peculiaris facultas aut dispensatio expresse mihi a Summo Pontifice tributa fuerit.

Translation:

I do promise, vow and swear that I will maintain inviolate secrecy about each and every thing brought to my knowledge in the performance of my aforesaid function, excepting only what may happen to be lawfully published when this process is concluded and put into effect ... and that I will never directly or indirectly, by gesture, word, writing or in any other way, and under any pretext, even that of a greater good or of a highly urgent and serious reason, do anything against this fidelity to secrecy, unless special permission or dispensation is expressly granted to me by the Supreme Pontiff.

Interviewed for a television programme in 2006, canon lawyer Thomas Doyle is quoted as saying that the tight secrecy demanded for the procedure as "an explicit written policy to cover up cases of child sexual abuse by the clergy, to punish those who would call attention to these crimes by churchmen". However, regarding the programme transcript, the BBC "cannot vouch for its accuracy". Not long after the broadcast, Doyle said, "Although I was a consultant to the producers of the documentary I am afraid that some of the distinctions I have made about the 1962 document have been lost. I do not believe now nor have I ever believed it to be proof of an explicit conspiracy, in the conventional sense, engineered by top Vatican officials, to cover up cases of clergy sexual abuse."

In the study of the instruction that he revised less than two years later he stated: "According to the 1922 and 1962 documents, accusers and witnesses are bound by the secrecy obligation during and after the process but certainly not prior to the initiation of the process. There is no basis to assume that the Holy See envisioned this process to be a substitute for any secular legal process, criminal or civil. It is also incorrect to assume, as some have unfortunately done, that these two Vatican documents are proof of a conspiracy to hide sexually abusive priests or to prevent the disclosure of sexual crimes committed by clerics to secular authorities." He also remarked: "To fully understand the overriding concern for secrecy one must also understand the traditional canonical concept known as the 'Privilege of the Forum' privilegium fori which has its roots in medieval Canon Law. Basically this is a traditional privilege claimed by the institutional church whereby clerics accused of crimes were tried before ecclesiastical courts and not brought before civil or secular courts. Although this privilege is anachronistic in contemporary society, the attitude or mentality which holds clerics accountable only to the institutional church authorities is still active. This does not mean that the official Church believes that clerics accused of crimes should not to be held accountable. It means that during certain periods in history the Church has believed that it alone should have the right to subject accused clerics to a judicial process."

John L. Allen Jr. has said the secrecy was aimed rather at the protection of all involved, the accused, the victim/denouncer and the witnesses, before the verdict was passed, and for free finding of facts.

== Involvement of the Holy See ==
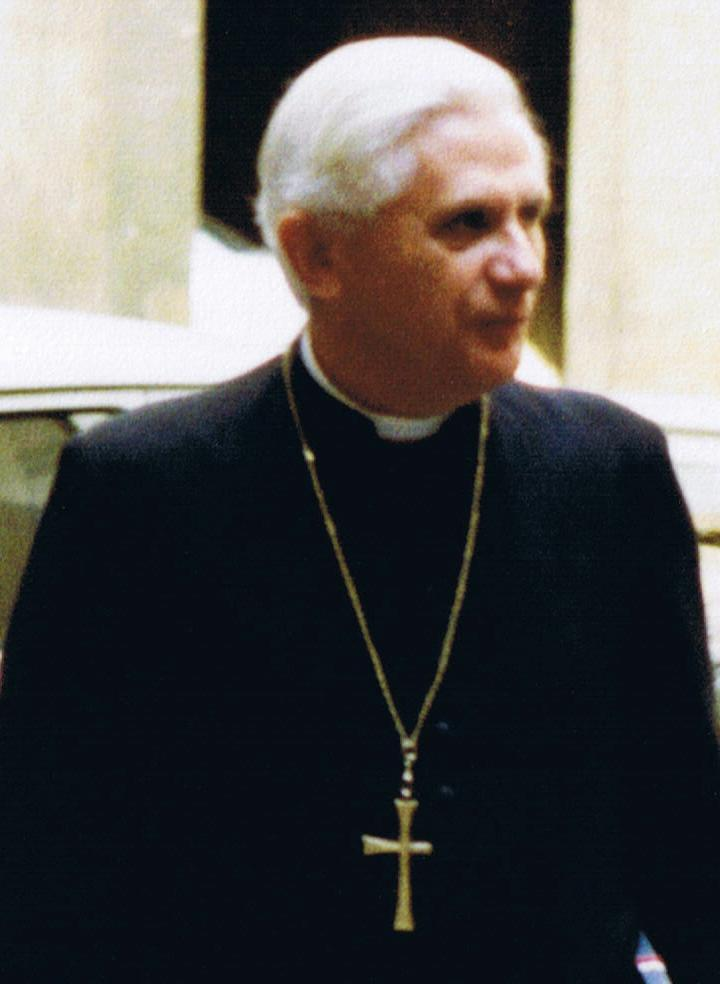
Cardinal Joseph Ratzinger

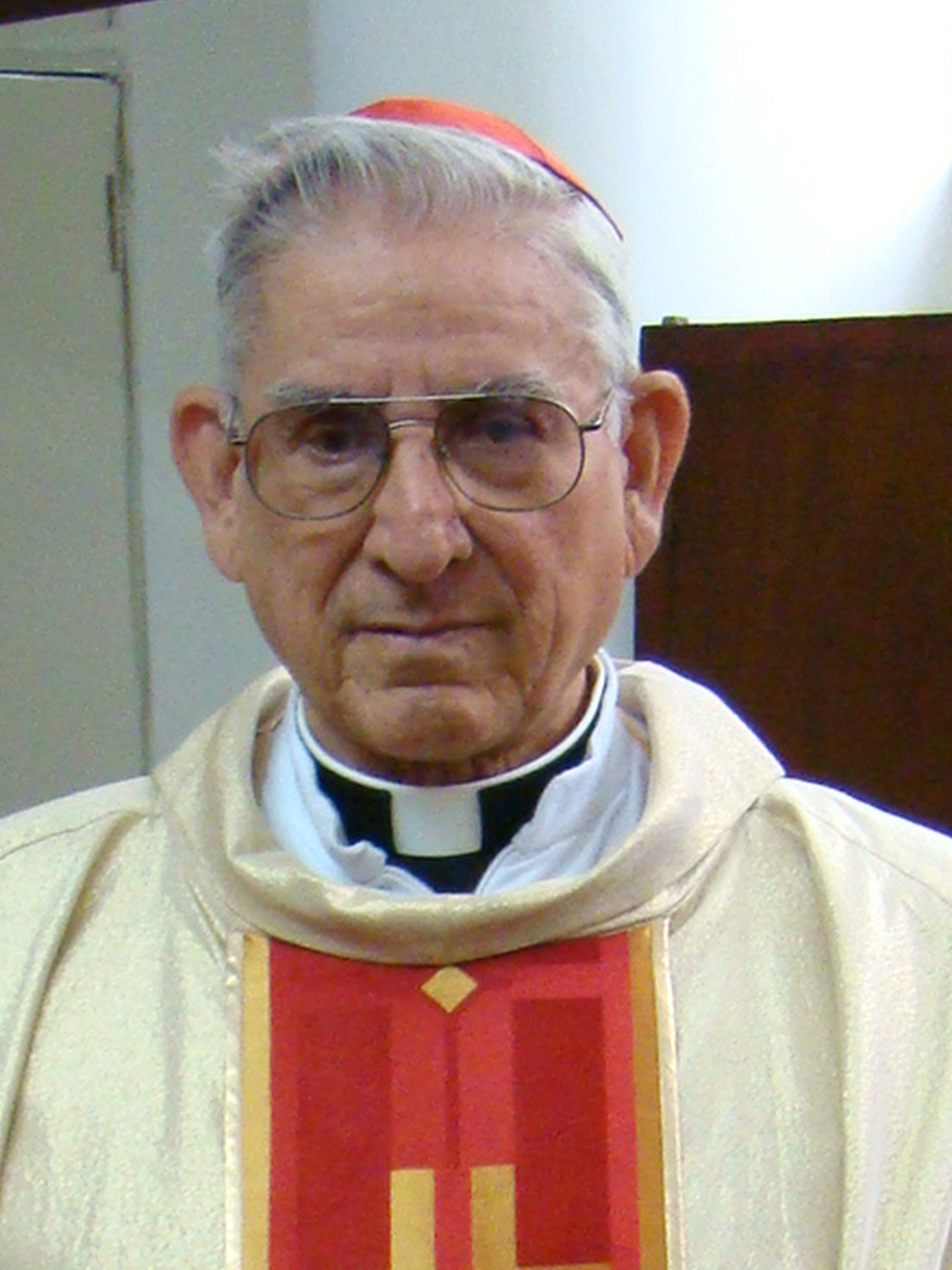
Cardinal Darío Castrillon

A New York Times article published on 1 July 2010 said that the 1962 instruction was a restatement of that of 1922, giving the Sacred Congregation of the Holy Office authority to prosecute clergy accused of sexual abuse. According to Canon law expert Nicholas P. Cafardi, the CDF itself did not know it had this power under Ratzinger, until 2001. "From what can be deduced from published reports, there seems to have been a power struggle going on between Cardinal Dario Castrillon Hoyos, prefect of the Congregation for the Clergy and Ratzinger at the CDF over which congregation had competency in the matter of clergy who had sexually abused minors." At a meeting in Rome in 2000, the Archbishop of Adelaide, Philip Wilson, drew Vatican officials' attention to the long forgotten Crimen sollicitationis which gave CDF jurisdiction. Pope John Paul II subsequently issued Sacramentorum Sanctitatis Tutela directing that all cases of sexual abuse by priests be handled by the CDF.

Crimen sollicitationis repeated that, under pain of grave sin, any ordinary (bishop or equivalent) who received a denunciation of the crime of solicitation was to inform immediately the Holy See and the ordinary of the place of residence of the accused priest. It was for the ordinary of the place of residence to investigate the charge at the first level (in prima instantia); the Holy See reserved to itself the right to intervene at this level only "for particular and grave reasons".

The defendant did not lose the right that all members of the Church have to ask that their cases, at any level, be submitted to the Holy See; but once the trial had begun, such a recourse did not suspend the jurisdiction of the local judge, unless he learned that the Holy See had actually accepted the recourse. After sentence was passed, the defendant could appeal to the Holy See against it within ten days. If he did, any suspension from hearing confessions or exercising sacred ministry remained in force, but any other penalties imposed on him were suspended, until a decision was made on the appeal. The "promoter of justice" (the official Church prosecutor) could likewise appeal to the Holy See against a verdict in favour of the accused. This constituted an exception to the normal procedure whereby appeals against a first-level sentence are made to a designated second-level tribunal, with the case going to Rome only if the first two tribunals give discordant verdicts.
