= Dicastery for the Doctrine of the Faith =

Department of the Roman Curia

Coordinates: 41°54′04″N 12°27′22″E

- Dicasterium pro doctrina fidei
- Coat of arms of the Holy See

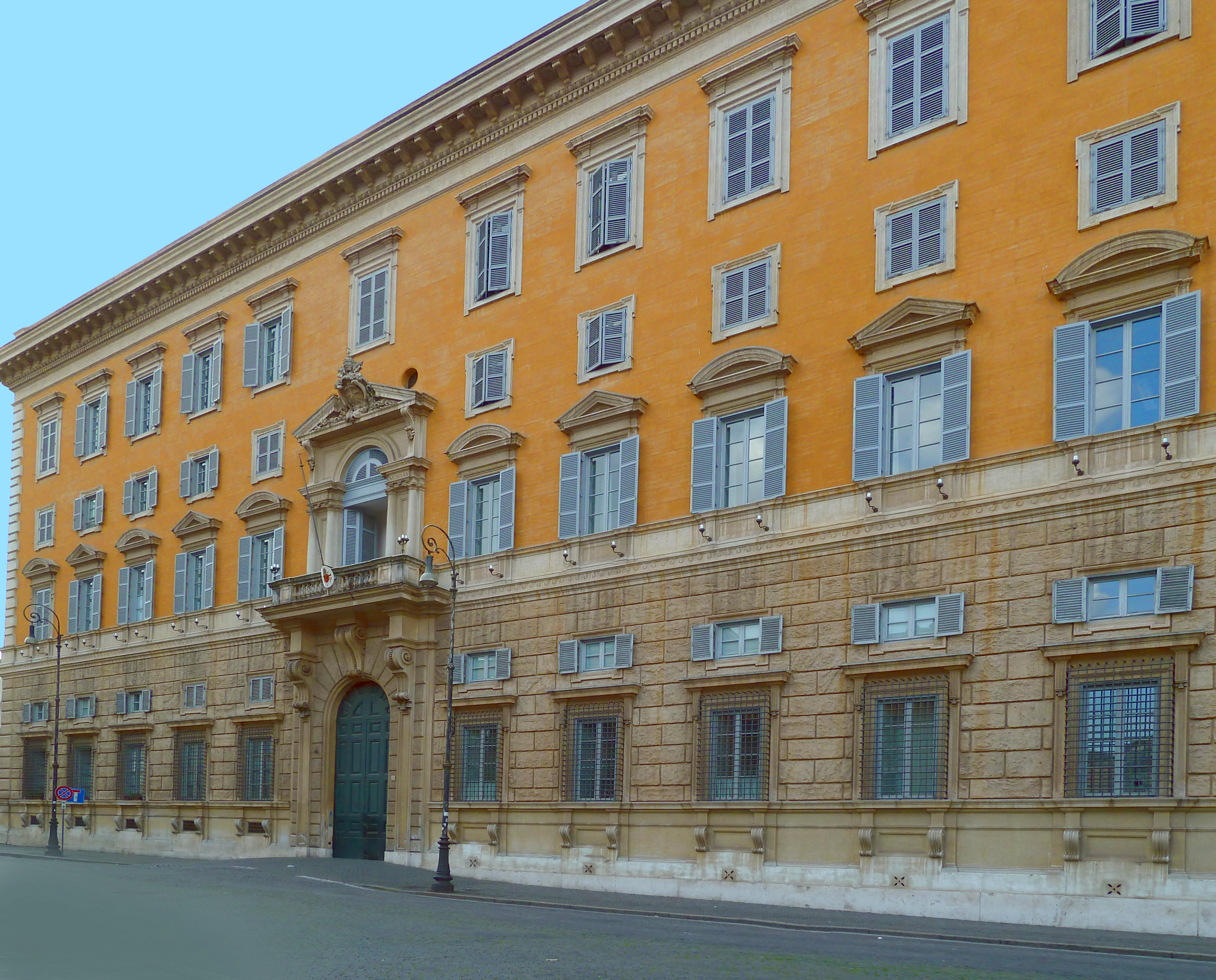
- The Palace of the Holy Office

Dicastery overview
- Formed: July 21, 1542; 484 years ago
- Preceding agencies: Supreme Sacred Congregation of the Roman and Universal Inquisition; Supreme Sacred Congregation of the Holy Office; Congregation for the Doctrine of the Faith
- Type: Dicastery
- Headquarters: Palazzo del Sant'Uffizio, Rome, Italy
- Dicastery executives: Víctor Manuel Fernández, Prefect; Armando Matteo, Secretary; John Joseph Kennedy, Secretary; Joseph Augustine Di Noia, OP, Adjunct Secretary; Charles Jude Scicluna, Adjunct Secretary
- Parent department: Roman Curia
- Website: doctrinafidei.va, www.vatican.va/roman_curia/congregations/cfaith/index.htm

The Dicastery for the Doctrine of the Faith (DDF) is a department of the Roman Curia in charge of the religious discipline of the Catholic Church. The Dicastery is the oldest among the departments of the Roman Curia. Its seat is the Palace of the Holy Office in Rome, just outside Vatican City. It was founded to defend the Catholic Church from heresy and is the body responsible for promulgating and defending Catholic doctrine.

This institution was founded by Pope Paul III on 21 July 1542, as the Supreme Sacred Congregation of the Roman and Universal Inquisition. (Note: The names "Roman Inquisition" or "Holy Inquisition" arose from this name, terms later popularly used in reference to the 16th-century tribunals against heresy.) It was then renamed in 1908 as the Supreme Sacred Congregation of the Holy Office. In 1965, it became the Congregation for the Doctrine of the Faith (CDF; Latin: Congregatio pro Doctrina Fidei). Since 2022, it is named Dicastery for the Doctrine of the Faith. (Note: Pope Francis reorganized the Curia with his apostolic constitution on the Roman Curia, titled Praedicate evangelium ("Preach the gospel"), which took effect on 5 June 2022.) It is still informally known as the Holy Office (Latin: Sanctum Officium) in many Catholic countries. The sole objective of the dicastery is to "spread sound Catholic doctrine and defend those points of Christian tradition which seem in danger because of new and unacceptable doctrines."

The congregation employs an advisory board including cardinals, bishops, priests, lay theologians, and canon lawyers. On 1 July 2023, Pope Francis named Argentine archbishop Víctor Manuel Fernández as prefect, who took possession of the office in mid-September.

== History ==
On 21 July 1542, Pope Paul III proclaimed the Apostolic Constitution Licet ab initio, establishing the Supreme Sacred Congregation of the Roman and Universal Inquisition, staffed by cardinals and other officials whose task it was "to maintain and defend the integrity of the faith and to examine and proscribe errors and false doctrines." It served as the final court of appeal in trials of heresy and served as an important part of the Counter-Reformation.

This body was renamed the Supreme Sacred Congregation of the Holy Office in 1908 by Pope Pius X. In many Catholic countries, the body is often informally called the Holy Office (e.g., Italian: Sant'Uffizio and Spanish: Santo Oficio).

The congregation's name was changed to Sacred Congregation for the Doctrine of the Faith (SCDF) on 7 December 1965, at the end of the Second Vatican Council. Soon after the 1983 Code of Canon Law came into effect, the adjective "sacred" was dropped from the names of all Curial Congregations, (Note: It remained in use throughout 1984, as can be seen in the Acta Apostolicae Sedis of that year, but no longer appeared in the 1985 issues of that official bulletin of the Holy See.) and so it became the Congregation for the Doctrine of the Faith. In 2022, the name was changed to Dicastery for the Doctrine of the Faith.

On September 23, 2024, Pope Francis appointed 28 Italian new consultors of the dicastery.

=== Timeline ===
1542	The Supreme Sacred Congregation of the Roman and Universal Inquisition is established
1622	Pope Gregory XV writes a letter addressing the issue of priests abusing the confessional to solicit "shameful and dishonorable conduct". The letter is referenced in Sacramentum Poenitentiae (1741).
1665	The General Congregation of the Universal Inquisition, in the presence of Pope Alexander VII, reiterates that propositions by confessors to solicit or provoke sex from penitents are "alien and discordant by the Evangelical truth and clearly so by the sixth and seventh doctrines of the Holy Fathers" and are to be "checked, condemned, and prohibited. […] The Inquisitors of Heretical Depravity […] [should] seek out and proceed against everyone – every priest […] who has essayed to tempt a penitent."
1908	The Inquisition is renamed the Supreme Sacred Congregation of the Holy Office by Pope Pius X.
1965	The Supreme Sacred Congregation of the Holy Office is renamed the Congregation for the Doctrine of the Faith (CDF).
1988	Pope John Paul II reaffirms the authority of the CDF on 28 June: "The proper duty of the Congregation for the Doctrine of the Faith is to promote and safeguard the doctrine on faith and morals in the whole Catholic world; so it has competence in things that touch this matter in any way."
2001	John Paul II issues Sacramentorum Sanctitatis Tutela "by which are promulgated Norms concerning the more grave delicts reserved to the Congregation for the Doctrine of the Faith." It, again, reaffirms the CDF's responsibilities, expressing that it was necessary to define more precisely both "the more grave delicts whether against morals or committed in the celebration of the sacraments" for which the competence of the Congregation for the Doctrine of the Faith remains exclusive, and also the special procedural norms "for declaring or imposing canonical sanctions."
2014	On 11 November, Pope Francis sets up within the CDF a special body to expedite consideration of appeals by priests against laicization or other penalties imposed on them in cases of sexual abuse.
2015	Francis establishes an ecclesiastical judicial commission, which will have its own staff and secretary, to try bishops, which will work with other units of the CDF and with the congregation that has oversight over the bishop.
2018	Francis appoints three women as consultors to the Congregation, the first in its history.
2019	The Pontifical Commission Ecclesia Dei is merged into the Congregation.
2022	On 14 February, Francis reorganises the CDF through the motu proprio Fidem servare, dividing it into two departments: a doctrinal section and a disciplinary section, each with its own secretary reporting to the prefect. The formerly independent marriage section is merged into the doctrinal section.
2022	On 5 June, the Congregation for the Doctrine of the Faith is renamed the Dicastery for the Doctrine of the Faith (DDF) as part of the restructuring of the Roman Curia by the apostolic constitution Praedicate evangelium. At the same time the Pontifical Commission for the Protection of Minors became part of this Dicastery, operating with its own staff and according to its own norms.
2023	A 21 October, rescript of Pope Francis stated that the Pope's sole signature "affixed at the bottom" of any document of the Doctrinal Section of the DDF, "including those preceding this Rescript", expressed the pope's approval and his authorisation for a possible publication of said document.

== Role ==
According to the 1988 Apostolic Constitution on the Roman Curia, Pastor bonus, article 48, promulgated by John Paul II: "The proper duty of the Congregation for the Doctrine of the Faith is to promote and safeguard the doctrine on faith and morals in the whole Catholic world; so it has competence in things that touch this matter in any way."

This includes investigations into grave delicts (i.e., acts which the Catholic Church considers as being the most serious crimes: crimes against the Eucharist and against the sanctity of the Sacrament of Penance, and crimes against the sixth Commandment ("Thou shalt not commit adultery")) committed by a cleric against a person under the age of eighteen. These crimes, in Sacramentorum sanctitatis tutela a motu proprio of 2001, come under the competency of the Congregation for the Doctrine of the Faith. In effect, it is the "promoter of justice" that deals with, among other things, the question of priests accused of paedophilia. (Note: The revision of Norms concerning the more grave delicts reserved to the Congregation for the Doctrine of the Faith currently in force is the revision approved by Benedict XVI in 2010.)

Within the DDF are the International Theological Commission and the Pontifical Biblical Commission. The Prefect of the DDF is ex officio president of these commissions.

On 7 December 2021, Pope Francis promulgated a new version of the "Norms on the Delicts Reserved to the Congregation of the Doctrine of the Faith"; the original version had been first promulgated in 2001 by John Paul II and amended in 2010 by Benedict XVI. The changes of the new version concern "harmonising the norms with the revised Book VI of the Code of Canon Law, which was promulgated in May 2021" and adding "numerous normative measures of various kinds issued in previous years, especially since 2016."

== Organization ==
Until 1968, the pope held the title of prefect and appointed a cardinal to preside over the meetings, first as Secretary, then as Pro-Prefect.

Since 1968, the Cardinal head of the dicastery has borne the title of Prefect and the title of Secretary refers to the second highest-ranking officer of the Congregation. As of 2012 the Congregation had a membership of 18 cardinals and a smaller number of non-cardinal bishops, a staff of 38 (clerical and lay) and 26 consultors.

The work of the CDF is divided into two sections, the doctrinal and the disciplinary. The CDF holds biennial plenary assemblies, and issues documents on doctrinal, disciplinary, and sacramental questions that occasionally include notifications concerning writings by Catholic theologians.

The disciplinary section has responsibility for dealing with credible allegations against clergy. Archbishop Kennedy leads a staff of 16 full-time officials.

On his appointment as prefect, Cardinal Fernández was instructed to focus on the Dicastery's doctrinal work and leave the disciplinary section alone.

== Recent canonical judgments and publications ==
The following is a non-exhaustive list of recent documents and judgments issued by the DDF. Lengthy DDF documents usually have Latin titles. A short document that briefly states objections to one or more writings by a Catholic theologian is typically called a "notification".

=== 2021–present ===
- Venite ad me: Considerations on the Transmission of the Faith in an Epochal Change, published on 22 October 2026, drawing on the words of Matthew 11:28: "Come to me" for its title.
- Una caro: a doctrinal note on the Value of Matrimony as an Exclusive Union and Mutual Belonging, published on 25 November 2025.
- On May 18, 2024, the Dicastery Prefect Víctor Manuel Fernández published a 2024 text signed by Pope Francis which replaced the 1978 Norms regarding the manner of proceeding in the discernment of presumed apparitions or revelations rulings. The pope set new norms and guidelines for Catholic bishops in discerning claims of private revelation such as Marian apparitions. Fernández enumerated six possible conclusions for alleged supernatural phenomena discernment.
- Dignitas Infinita, promulgated April 8, 2024: condemns war, poverty, racism, sexual abuse, "violence against women", "human trafficking", "[m]arginalization of [p]eople with [d]isabilities", "sex change", abortion, euthanasia, "gender theory", "the practice of so-called surrogate motherhood", discrimination against migrants, "digital violence", and the "imprison[ment], [torture], and even depriv[ation] of the good of life solely because of [one's] sexual orientation", as denying "dignity".
- Fiducia supplicans, promulgated 18 December 2023: establishes a series of clarifications and reforms on the so-called "irregular relationships." Namely, those who establish a monogamous and emotional bond that lasts over time and who have not contracted marriage without making any changes to the marriage institution as being between a man and a woman.
- Responsum of the Dicastery for the Doctrine of the Faith affirming that a transgender person can receive baptism, and that transgender people, as well as "cohabiting homosexuals", can be godparents and witnesses of matrimony even after undergoing hormone treatment and sex-reassignment surgery. Furthermore, the child of a homosexual couple can be baptized provided that there is a "founded hope" that the child will be brought up in the Catholic religion (31 October 2023).
- "Responsum of the Congregation for the Doctrine of the Faith to a dubium regarding the blessing of the unions of persons of the same sex", wherein the Church reaffirmed the view that "Church does not have, and cannot have, the power to bless unions of persons of the same sex" (15 March 2021).

=== 2011–2020 ===
- Redemptorist Fr. Tony Flannery is required to sign four fidelity oaths or not return to ministry (1 October 2020).
- "Doctrinal Assessment of the Leadership Conference of Women Religious" (re-affirmed by Pope Francis on 15 April 2013)

=== 2001–2010 ===
- Dignitas Personae (on bioethical questions, with summary and press conference transcript; 8 September 2008)
- On 5 April 2008, as a result of "grave reservations" by the Congregation for the Doctrine of the Faith about the Mormon practice of posthumous rebaptism, Catholic dioceses throughout the world were directed not to give information in parish registers to the Mormons' Genealogical Society of Utah for microfilming or digitizing.
- On 28 September 2007, Msgr. Gaston J. Hebert, the then apostolic administrator of the Diocese of Little Rock in the United States, stated that (per the 11 July Congregation for the Doctrine of the Faith) six Arkansas nuns were excommunicated for heresy (the first in the diocese's 165-year history). They refused to recant the doctrines of the Community of the Lady of All Nations (Army of Mary). The nuns are members of the Good Shepherd Monastery of Our Lady of Charity and Refuge in Hot Springs. Sister Mary Theresa Dionne, 82, one of the six, said they will still live at the convent property, which they own. The sect believes that its 86-year-old founder, Marie Paule Giguere, is the reincarnation of the Virgin Mary.
- In an April 2007 address to chaplains, Archbishop Amato denounced same-sex marriage and abortion and criticized the Italian media's coverage of them, saying that they are evils "that remain almost invisible" due to media presentation of them as "expression of human progress".
- "Notification on the works of the Reverend Father Jon Sobrino, SJ" (with an explanatory note; 26 November 2006)
- "Notification regarding the book Jesus Symbol of God of the Reverend Father Roger Haight, SJ"
- "Letter to the Bishops of the Catholic Church on the collaboration of men and women in the Church and in the world" (31 May 2004)
- "Doctrinal Note on some questions regarding the participation of Catholics in political life" (with two commentaries from Cardinals Joachim Meisner and Giacomo Biffi; 24 November 2002)
- "Considerations Regarding Proposals to Give Legal Recognition to Unions Between Homosexual Persons" (3 June 2003)
- "Note on the Force of the Doctrinal Decrees Concerning the Thought and Work of the Reverend Father Antonio Rosmini Serbati" (1 July 2001)
- "Notification on the book Toward a Christian Theology of Religious Pluralism by the Reverend Father Jacques Dupuis, SJ" (with commentary; 24 January 2001)

=== 1991–2000 ===
- "Notification concerning some writings of Professor Dr. Reinhard Messner" (30 November 2000)
- Dominus Iesus (Declaration on the unicity and salvific universality of Jesus Christ and the Church; with comments from Congregation officials; 6 August 2000)
- "Notification regarding Sister Jeannine Gramick, SSND, and the Reverend Father Robert Nugent, SDS"
- "Considerations on The Primacy of the Successor of Peter in the mystery of the Church" (31 October 1998)
- "Notification concerning the writings of the Reverend Father Anthony De Mello, SJ" (24 June 1998)
- "Notification concerning the text Mary and Human Liberation by the Reverend Father Tissa Balasuriya, OMI" (2 January 1997)
- "Notification on the writings and activities of Mrs. Vassula Ryden" (6 October 1995)
- "Decree on the doctrine and customs of the Association Opus Angelorum" (6 June 1992)

=== 1981–1990 ===
- Orationis formas (Letter to the Bishops of the Catholic Church on some aspects of Christian meditation; 15 October 1989)
- "Note regarding the moral rule of Humanae vitae (Pope Paul VI's encyclical, On the Regulation and Control of Human Birth) and the pastoral duty" (16 February 1989)
- "Observation of the Anglican-Roman Catholic International Commission (ARCIC) II's Salvation and the Church" (18 November 1988)
- "Formula to be used for the profession of faith and for the oath of fidelity to assume an office to be exercised in the name of the Church" (1 July 1988)
- Donum vitae (Instruction on respect for life in its origin and on the dignity of procreation; 22 February 1987)
- Homosexualitatis problema (Letter to the Bishops of the Catholic Church on the Pastoral Care of Homosexual Persons; 1 October 1986)
- "Notification on the book Pleidooi voor mensen in de Kerk (Nelissen, Baarn 1985) by the Reverend Father Professor Edward Schillebeeckx, OP" (15 September 1986)
- "Letter to György Bulányi on certain writings attributed to him" (1 September 1986)
- "Notification on the book Church: Charism and Power: Essay on Militant Ecclesiology by Leonardo Boff, OFM" (11 March 1985)

== Leadership ==
Cardinal Prefect of Dicastery for the Doctrine of the Faith
- Coat of arms of the Holy See
- Dicastery for the Doctrine of the Faith
- Style: His Eminence
- Member of: Roman Curia
- Reports to: The Pope
- Appointer: The Pope
- Term length: Five years, renewable
- Constituting instrument: Licet ab initio Pastor bonus Praedicate evangelium
- Formation: 21 July 1542
- First holder: Antonio Ghislieri

=== Secretaries until 1965 ===
When the Supreme Sacred Congregation for the Roman and Universal Inquisition was first established in 1542, it was composed of several cardinal inquisitors styled as "inquisitors-general", who were formally equal to each other, even if some of them were clearly dominant (e.g. Cardinal Gian Pietro Carafa from 1542, who was elected Pope Paul IV in 1555). Until 1968, the pope himself presided over the Congregation. However, from 1564 the daily administration of the affairs of the Congregation was entrusted to the cardinal secretary. This model was retained when the Inquisition was formally renamed as the Supreme Sacred Congregation of the Holy Office in 1908.

Unless stated otherwise, the term of office ended with the officeholder's death.

	Name	From	Until	Appointer
1	Antonio Ghislieri (elected as Pope Pius V; later canonized in 1712)	14 December 1564	7 January 1566	Pius IV
2	Diego de Espinosa	8 September 1566	5 September 1572	Pius V
3	Scipione Rebiba	8 April 1573	23 July 1577	Pius V
4	Giacomo Savelli	31 July 1577	5 December 1587	Gregory XIII
5	Giulio Antonio Santori	5 December 1587	9 May 1602	Sixtus V
6	Camillo Borghese (elected as Pope Paul V)	9 June 1603	16 May 1605	Clement VIII
7	Pompeio Arrigoni	16 May 1605	4 April 1616	Paul V
8	Giovanni Garzia Millini	4 April 1616	2 October 1629	Paul V
9	Antonio Marcello Barberini	2 October 1629	1 December 1633	Urban VIII
10	Francesco Barberini	1 December 1633	10 December 1679	Urban VIII
11	Cesare Facchinetti	10 December 1679	31 January 1683	Innocent XI
12	Alderano Cybo	31 January 1683	22 July 1700	Innocent XI
13	Galeazzo Marescotti	22 July 1700	1 January 1716	Innocent XII
14	Fabrizio Spada	1 January 1716	15 June 1717	Clement XI
15	Nicolò Acciaioli	15 June 1717	23 February 1719	Clement XI
16	Francesco del Giudice	25 February 1719	10 October 1725	Clement XI
17	Fabrizio Paolucci	10 October 1725	12 June 1726	Benedict XIII
18	Pietro Ottoboni	14 June 1726	29 February 1740	Benedict XIII
19	Tommaso Ruffo	29 August 1740	16 February 1753	Benedict XIV
20	Neri Maria Corsini	26 February 1753	6 December 1770	Benedict XIV
21	Giovanni Francesco Stoppani	12 December 1770	18 November 1774	Clement XIV
22	Luigi Maria Torregiani	22 February 1775	6 January 1777	Pius VI
23	Carlo Rezzonico	17 January 1777	26 January 1799	Pius VI
24	Leonardo Antonelli	8 November 1800	23 January 1811	Pius VII
25	Giulio Maria della Somaglia	20 May 1814	2 April 1830	Pius VII
26	Bartolomeo Pacca	5 April 1830	19 April 1844	Pius VIII
27	Vincenzo Macchi	25 April 1844	30 September 1860	Gregory XVI
28	Costantino Patrizi Naro	10 October 1860	17 December 1876	Pius IX
29	Prospero Caterini	21 December 1876	28 October 1881	Pius IX
30	Antonio Maria Panebianco	30 March 1882	25 January 1883	Leo XIII
31	Luigi Maria Bilio, CRSP	25 January 1883	30 January 1884	Leo XIII
32	Raffaele Monaco La Valletta	15 February 1884	14 July 1896	Leo XIII
33	Lucido Maria Parocchi	5 August 1896	15 January 1903	Leo XIII
34	Serafino Vannutelli	16 January 1903	30 December 1908 (Note: Resigned.)	Leo XIII
35	Mariano Rampolla	30 December 1908	16 December 1913	Pius X
36	Domenico Ferrata	3 January 1914	10 October 1914	Pius X
37	Rafael Merry del Val (cause for canonization opened in 1953)	14 October 1914	26 February 1930	Benedict XV
38	Donato Sbarretti	4 July 1930	1 April 1939	Pius XI
39	Francesco Marchetti-Selvaggiani	30 April 1939	13 January 1951	Pius XI
40	Giuseppe Pizzardo	16 February 1951	12 October 1959	Pius XII
41	Alfredo Ottaviani	7 November 1959	7 December 1965	John XXIII

=== Prefects since 1965 ===
When Pope Paul VI changed the name of the dicastery on 7 December 1965, he changed the title of the cardinal in charge of the daily administration of the Congregation from secretary to pro-prefect. He continued to reserve the title of prefect to himself until 1968, when he relinquished his role as head of the Congregation and named a prefect.

No.	Name	From	Until	Appointer
1	Alfredo Ottaviani; Pro-Prefect (Note: Cardinal Alfredo Ottaviani, previously Secretary, continued to head the Congregation when it was renamed on 7 December 1965, and his title of Pro-Prefect was confirmed on 8 February 1966. Upon his retirement he was termed Prefect emeritus of the Congregation, and not Pro-Prefect emeritus.) (1890–1979)	7 December 1965	6 January 1968	Paul VI
2	Franjo Šeper (1905–1981)	8 January 1968 (Note: Since the appointment of Šeper in 1968, the head of the dicastery has the title of Prefect. The Pope no longer holds the office of Prefect of the CDF himself.)	25 November 1981	Paul VI
3	Joseph Ratzinger (elected as Pope Benedict XVI) (1927–2022)	25 November 1981	2 April 2005 (Note: Death of Pope John Paul II)	John Paul II
4	William Levada (1936–2019)	13 May 2005	2 July 2012	Benedict XVI
5	Gerhard Ludwig Müller (b. 1947)	2 July 2012	2 July 2017	Benedict XVI
6	Luis Ladaria Ferrer, SJ (b. 1944)	2 July 2017	1 July 2023	Francis
7	Víctor Manuel Fernández (b. 1962)	1 July 2023	21 April 2025	Francis

=== Secretaries since 1965 ===
With the December 1965 reorganization of the Holy Office as the Sacred Congregation for the Doctrine of the Faith, the head of the Congregation was no longer titled secretary. The dicastery's second-in-command, until then titled assessor, was then given the title of secretary, as was already the case with the other Roman Congregations. All but the most recent have been made archbishops upon their appointment. The following have held the title of secretary:

- Pietro Parente (7 December 1965 – 29 June 1967)
- Paul-Pierre Philippe, O.P. (29 June 1967 – 6 March 1973)
- Jean Jérôme Hamer, O.P. (14 June 1973 – 8 April 1984)
- Alberto Bovone (5 April 1984 – 13 June 1995)
- Tarcisio Bertone, S.D.B. (13 June 1995 – 10 December 2002)
- Angelo Amato, S.D.B. (19 December 2002 – 9 July 2008)
- Luis Ladaria Ferrer, S.J. (9 July 2008 – 2 July 2017)
- Giacomo Morandi (18 July 2017 – 10 January 2022)
- Archbishop John Joseph Kennedy, (Disciplinary Section) and Armando Matteo (Doctrinal Section) (23 April 2022 – present)

== Present composition ==
- Cardinal-Prefect: Víctor Manuel Fernández
- Secretary for Discipline: Archbishop John Joseph Kennedy
- Secretary for Doctrine: Armando Matteo
- Adjunct Secretary: Archbishop Joseph Augustine Di Noia, O.P.
- Adjunct Secretary: Archbishop Charles Scicluna
- Undersecretary: Fr. Matteo Visioli
- Undersecretary: Archbishop Philippe Curbelié
- Promoter of Justice: Fr. Robert J. Geisinger S.J.
- 27 members
- 28 Consultors (religious superiors and canon lawyers)
- Staff of 33 lay theologians

== See also ==
- Inquisition
- Index Librorum Prohibitorum
- Archive of the Congregation for the Doctrine of the Faith
- Strengthening Church Members Committee, a Mormon organization which serves a similar role
