= John Joseph Kennedy =

Irish Catholic archbishop (born 1968)

The Most Reverend John Joseph Kennedy
- Secretary of the Dicastery for the Doctrine of the Faith
- Church: Catholic Church
- See: Absorus (titular)
- Appointed: 23 Apr 2022
- Predecessor: Giacomo Morandi
- Other post: Titular archbishop of Absorus (since 2024)

Orders
- Ordination: 13 July 1993 by Desmond Connell
- Consecration: 28 September 2024 by Víctor Manuel Fernández

Personal details
- Born: John Joseph Kennedy; 15 July 1968 (age 58) Clontarf, Dublin, Ireland
- Denomination: Catholic
- Education: Pontifical Gregorian University
- Motto: Secundum verbum tuum
- Coat of arms: John Joseph Kennedy's coat of arms

Styles of John Joseph Kennedy
- Reference style: The Most Reverend
- Spoken style: Your Excellency
- Religious style: Archbishop

Ordination history of John Joseph Kennedy
History
Priestly ordination
- Ordained by: Desmond Connell
Episcopal consecration
- Principal consecrator: Víctor Manuel Fernández
- Co-consecrators: Dermot Farrell, Guy de Kerimel

John Joseph Kennedy (born 15 July 1968) is an Irish Catholic prelate who has served as Secretary for Discipline at the Dicastery for the Doctrine of the Faith since 2022. Previously, he served as Head of Office at the DDF.

== Biography ==
Kennedy was born in Clontarf, Dublin. He was ordained a priest on 13 July 1993 for the Archdiocese of Dublin. He obtained a Licentiate and then a Doctorate in Canon Law from the Pontifical Gregorian University. Among the positions held in Ireland he was Vice-Parish Priest of St. Agnes Church, then of St. Nicholas of Myra in Dublin.

He entered the service of the Holy See in September 2002 and began working with the Congregation of the Doctrine of the Faith in 2003, beginning his service there under its then prefect, Cardinal Ratzinger, later Pope Benedict XVI. From 2003 to 2017 he was an Official of then Congregation for the Doctrine of the Faith and, since 2017, he has been Head of the Disciplinary Section in the same Dicastery.

In an interview with Zenit, he described his reaction to hearing of the resignation of Benedict: "You sometimes meet people who ask you: 'Do you remember where you were on the day when JFK was shot, or the Twin Towers came down, or when World War II ended?' I can think very clearly of exactly where I was." He was "in the north of Italy, and I was just ready to leave the hotel after a two-day ski trip, and my brother phoned and said: 'What's going on in Rome?' I said: 'I don't really know. I'm not there.' He said: 'Switch on the TV as soon as you can, and you'll see exactly what's going on.'".

On his appointed as prefect, Cardinal Víctor Manuel Fernández was instructed by Pope Francis to focus on the Dicastery's doctrinal work and leave the disciplinary section alone.

In a May 2024 interview, he said the canonical inquiry into the convicted abuser priest Marko Rupnik was "at a fairly advanced stage".

On 23 April 2024, he was appointed secretary of the Congregation for the Doctrine of the Faith, later renamed the Dicastery for the Doctrine of the Faith. Thus, he has responsibility for dealing with credible allegations against clergy. He leads a staff of 16 full-time officials handling cases in his disciplinary section. On 29 July 2024 he was appointed Titular Archbishop of Absorus by Pope Francis. He was consecrated a Bishop on 28 September by Cardinal Víctor Manuel Fernández.

In September 2024, Archbishop Kennedy upheld the laicisation of Ariel Alberto Principi, a former diocesan priest convicted of child sexual abuse, disagreeing with an order from Secretariat of State.

Catholic Church titles
Preceded by None, new office	Secretary for Discipline of the Dicastery for the Doctrine of the Faith; 23 April 2022 – present	Succeeded by Incumbent
