= Angela Nicole Walker =

American activist (born 1974)

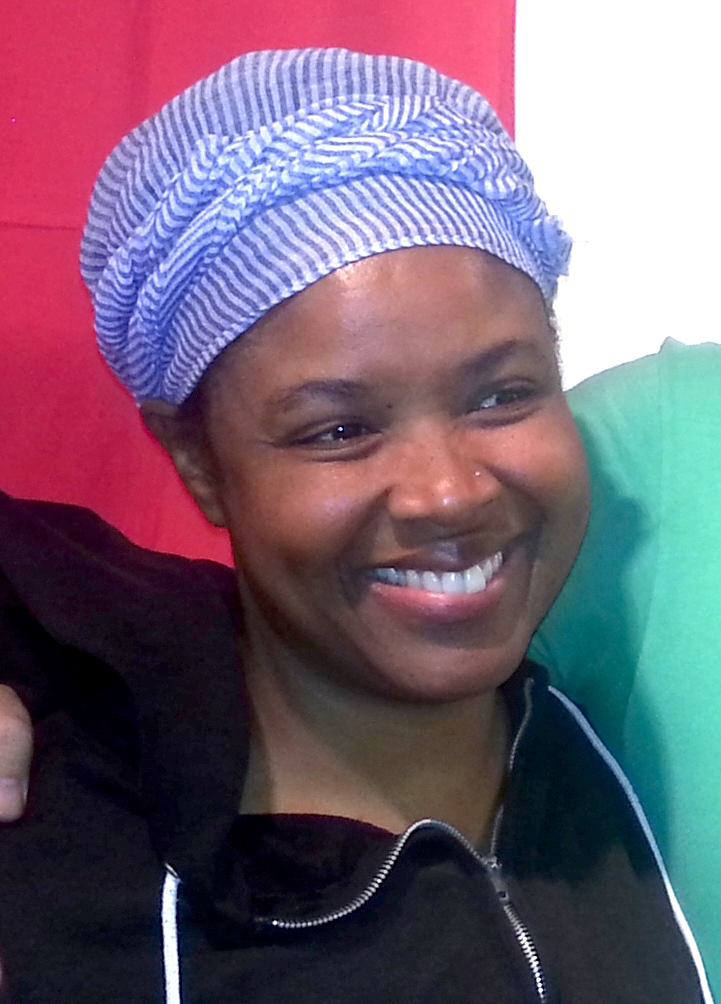
- Walker in 2015

Personal details
- Born: January 19, 1974 (age 52) Milwaukee, Wisconsin, U.S.
- Party: Socialist; Green
- Education: University of North Florida

Military service
- Allegiance: United States
- Branch/service: United States Army
- Unit: United States Army Reserve

Angela Nicole Walker (born January 19, 1974) is an American activist, professional driver, and labor organizer. Walker was the vice-presidential nominee of the Green Party of the United States and Socialist Party USA for the 2020 election alongside presidential nominee Howie Hawkins. She was previously the vice-presidential nominee of the Socialist Party USA for the 2016 election alongside presidential nominee Mimi Soltysik.

Walker ran for political office for the first time in 2014 as an independent socialist for sheriff of Milwaukee County, Wisconsin. Walker describes herself as a socialist in the tradition of Fred Hampton and Assata Shakur.

== Early life ==
Angela Walker was born and raised in Milwaukee, Wisconsin, where she lived primarily in the inner city Northside neighborhood. Walker graduated from Bay View High School. While in high school, Walker helped organize students in support of a Black History course at Bay View, which was successful. She studied history at the University of North Florida but dropped out in her final year because she "could make more money as a bus driver than as a teacher."

== Career ==
Walker worked for two years as a driver for Greyhound Lines. Describing her life as an "odyssey," Walker then moved to North Carolina, where she married and moved back to Florida. She moved back to Milwaukee in 2009 and was hired as a driver for the Milwaukee County Transit System.

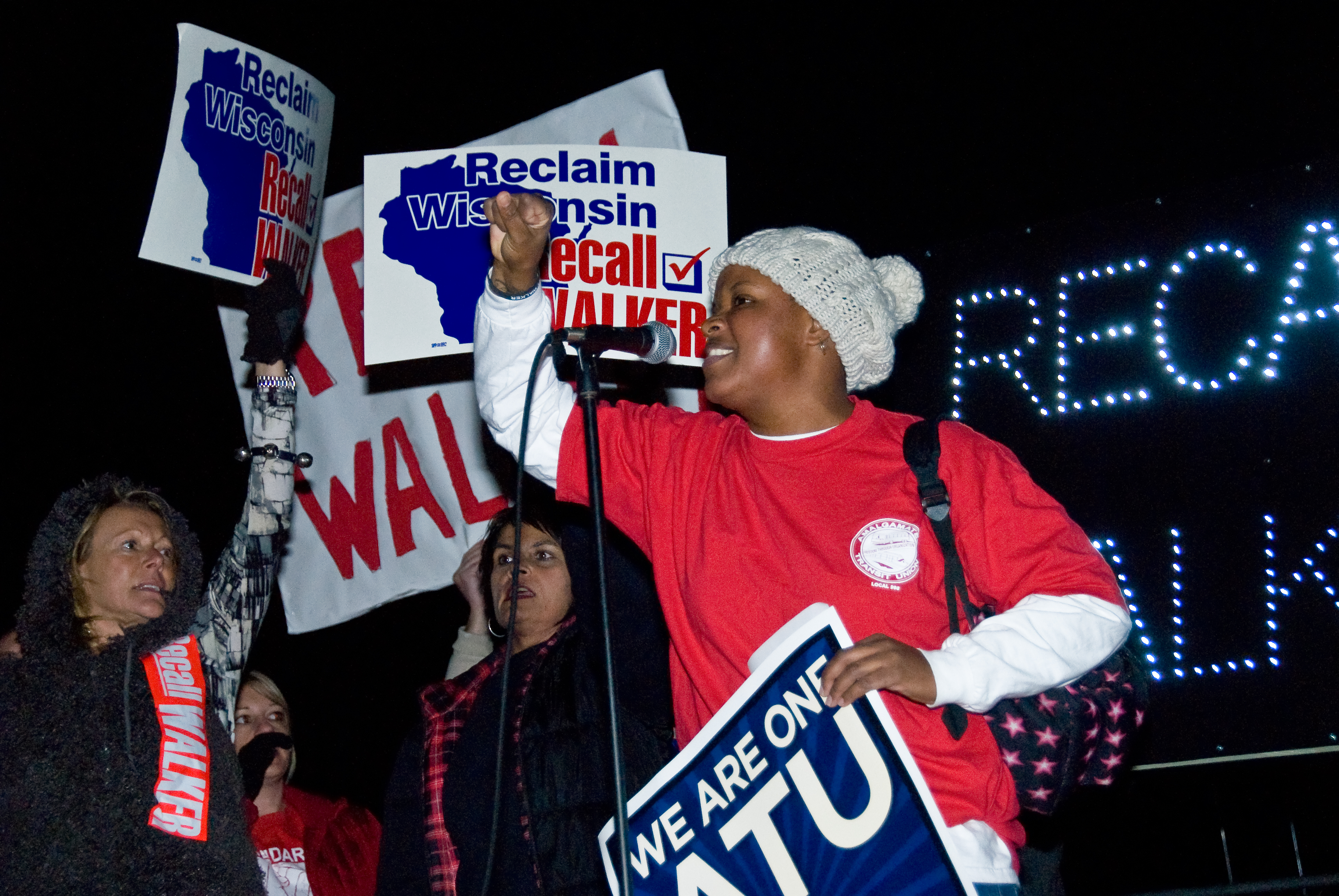
Walker rallying support for the Wisconsin gubernatorial recall election

In 2011, she became legislative director for her local in the Amalgamated Transit Union (ATU), which represented transit system drivers; her position coincided with the rise of the anti-labor union Tea Party and the election of Scott Walker as Wisconsin's 45th Governor. Angela Walker was active in the Occupy movement, which the ATU supported. She stepped down from the legislative director position in October 2013.

Walker worked as a bus driver for over 14 years. Walker is currently employed as a dump truck driver.

=== Sheriff campaign ===
In 2014, Walker ran against incumbent Democrat and Fox News pundit David A. Clarke Jr. During her campaign for sheriff in Milwaukee, Walker called for an end to mass incarceration, evictions, and anti-immigrant policing. She received approximately 20 percent of the vote.

== Vice-presidential campaigns ==
=== 2016 campaign ===
In March 2016, Walker stated that she had been recruited to be the Socialist Party USA vice-presidential nominee by her future running-mate, Mimi Soltysik, following her campaign for sheriff. Walker and Soltysik were nominated at the Socialist Party National Convention in Walker's hometown of Milwaukee, Wisconsin in October 2015. Soltysik-Walker appeared on the ballot in Colorado, Guam and Michigan as well as official write-in candidates in many other states during the general election.

=== 2020 campaign ===
On May 5, 2020, Green Party presidential candidate and Socialist Party USA presidential nominee Howie Hawkins announced Walker had accepted his offer to be his running mate. On July 11, Walker was formally nominated as the Green Party's vice-presidential nominee. She was the second African-American vice-presidential nominee of the Green Party and the first from the state of South Carolina.

=== Retirement from politics ===
After her 2020 vice presidential campaign, Walker announced on her personal Facebook page that she has retired from politics.

== Personal life ==
Walker is a vegetarian and bisexual.

On March 29, 2023, Walker announced that she married a woman from North Carolina.

== Electoral history ==
=== 2014 election ===
2014 Milwaukee County sheriff general election
| Party | Candidate | Votes | % |
|---|---|---|---|
| Democratic | David Clarke | 147,809 | 79.12 |
| Independent | Angela Walker | 37,289 | 19.96 |
| Nonpartisan | Write-in | 1,718 | 0.92 |

=== 2016 election ===
2016 United States presidential election results Socialist Party nominee for Vice President
| State or Territory | Percent | Vote total | On Ballot or Write-in |
|---|---|---|---|
| Guam | 4.22% | (1,357) | On Ballot |
| Michigan | 0.05% | 2,209 | On Ballot |
| Colorado | 0.01% | 271 | On Ballot |
| Texas | <0.01% | 72 | Write-in |
| Indiana | <0.01% | 57 | Write-in |
| New York | <0.01% | 36 | Write-in |
| Wisconsin | <0.01% | 33 | Write-in |
| Scattering | n/a | 15 | Write-Ins |
| Total | | 2,693 (4,050) | |

Party political offices
| Preceded by Alejandro Mendoza | Socialist nominee for Vice President of the United States; 2016, 2020 | Succeeded by Stephanie Cholensky |
| Preceded by Ajamu Baraka | Green nominee for Vice President of the United States; Endorsed; 2020 | Succeeded by Butch Ware |
