= Driving =

Operation of a vehicle

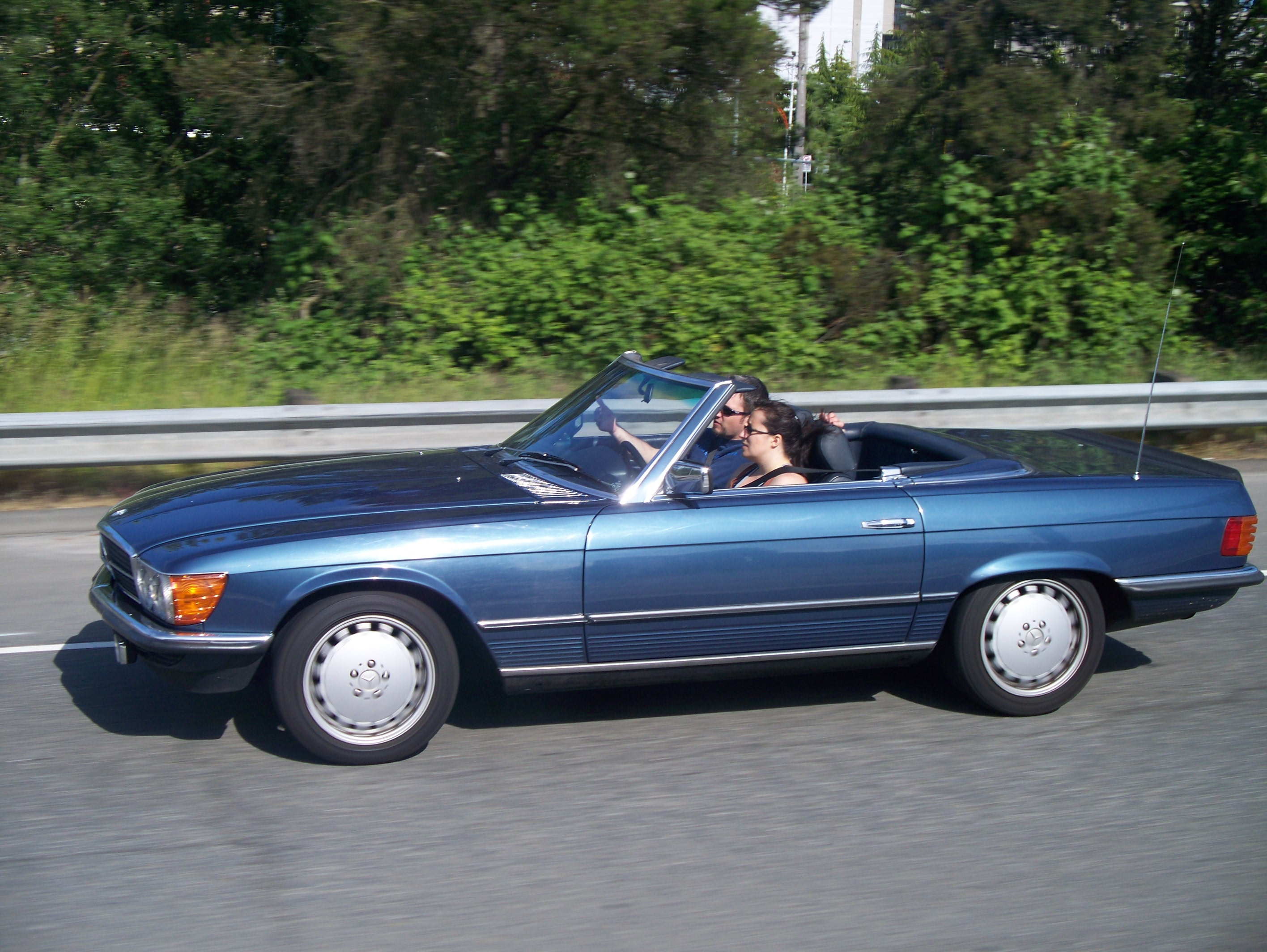
Driving a convertible

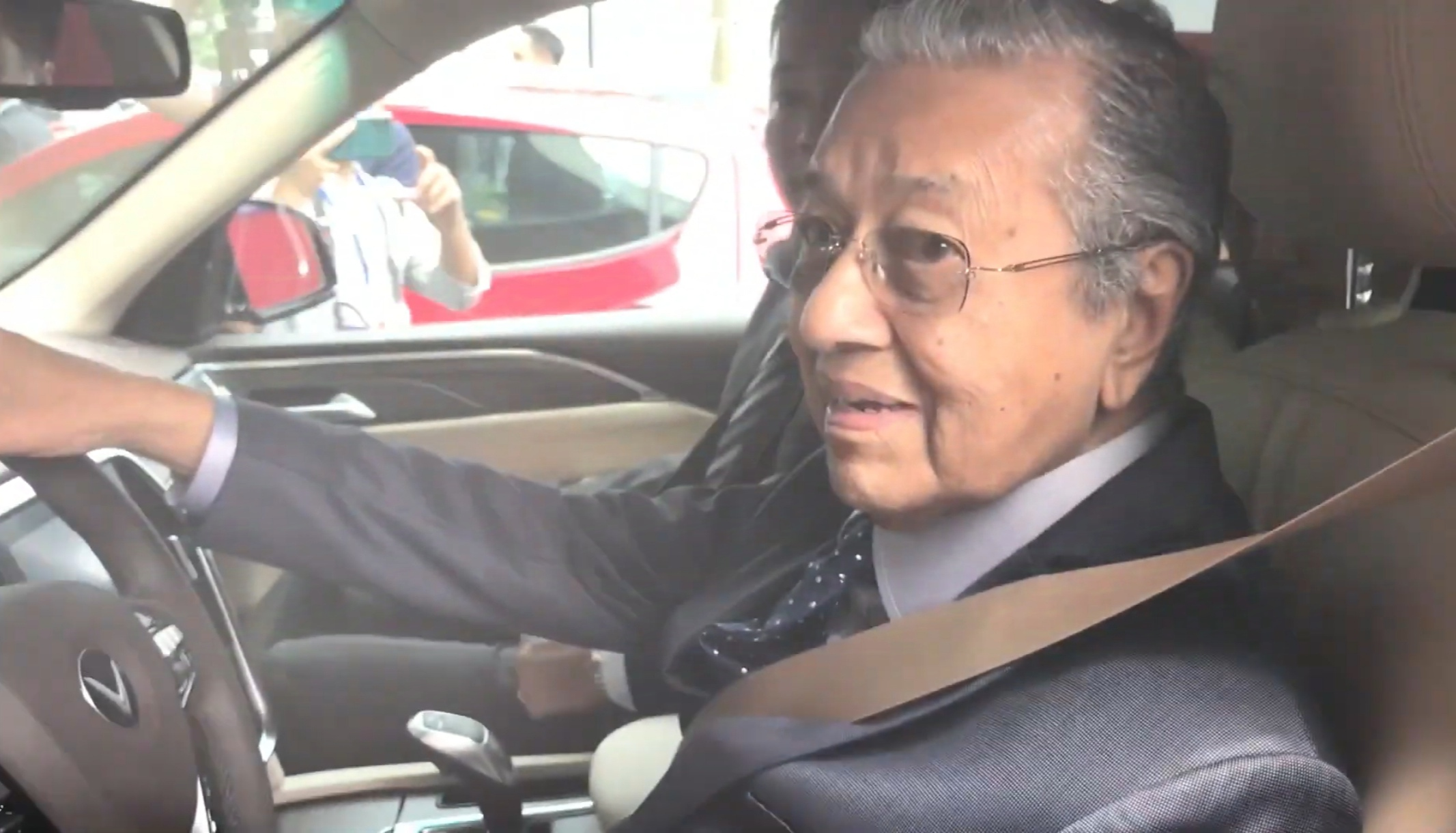
Malaysian Prime Minister Mahathir Mohamad driving a car in Vietnam

Driving is the controlled operation and movement of a land vehicle, including cars, taxis, ambulances, fire engines, tanks, vans, trucks and buses. A driver's permission to drive on public highways is granted based on a set of conditions being met, and drivers are required to follow the established road and traffic laws in the location they are driving. The word "driving" has etymology dating back to the 15th century. Its meaning has changed from primarily driving working animals in the 15th century to automobiles in the 19th century. Driving skills have also developed since the 15th century, with physical, mental and safety skills being required to drive. This evolution of the skills required to drive have been accompanied by the introduction of driving laws which relate not only to the driver but also to the driveability of a car.

The term "driver" originated in the 15th century, referring to the occupation of driving working animals such as pack or draft horses. It later applied to electric railway drivers in 1889 and motor-car drivers in 1896. The world's first long-distance road trip by automobile was in 1888, when Bertha Benz drove a Benz Patent-Motorwagen from Mannheim to Pforzheim, Germany. Driving requires both physical and mental skills, as well as an understanding of the rules of the road.

In many countries, drivers must pass practical and theoretical driving tests to obtain a driving license. Physical skills required for driving include proper hand placement, gear shifting, pedal operation, steering, braking, and operation of ancillary devices. Mental skills involve hazard awareness, decision-making, evasive maneuvering, and understanding vehicle dynamics. Distractions, altered states of consciousness, and certain medical conditions can impair a driver's mental skills.

Safety concerns in driving include poor road conditions, low visibility, texting while driving, speeding, impaired driving, sleep-deprived driving, and reckless driving. Laws regarding driving, driver licensing, and vehicle registration vary between jurisdictions. Most countries have laws against driving under the influence of alcohol or other drugs. Many jurisdictions use point systems for driver's licenses to track offenses and maintain road safety. A modern, data-driven counterpart in the commercial and insurance sectors is driver scoring, which uses telematics to monitor and evaluate driving behavior.

The World Health Organization estimates that 1.19 million people are killed annually as a result of road traffic accidents as of 2023; it is the leading cause of death for people aged 5 to 29.

A driver is the name of someone who drives vehicles.

== Etymology ==
The origin of the term driver, as recorded from the 15th century, refers to the occupation of driving working animals, especially pack horses or draft horses. The verb to drive in origin means "to force to move, to impel by physical force". It is first recorded of electric railway drivers in 1889 and of a motor-car driver in 1896. Early alternatives were motorneer, motor-man, motor-driver or motorist. French favors "conducteur" (the English equivalent, "conductor", being used—from the 1830s—not of the driver but of the person in charge of passengers and collecting fares), while German influenced areas adopted Fahrer (used of coach-drivers in the 18th century, but shortened about 1900 from the compound Kraftwagenfahrer), and the verbs führen, lenken, steuern—all with a meaning "steer, guide, navigate"—translating to conduire.

== Introduction of the automobile ==
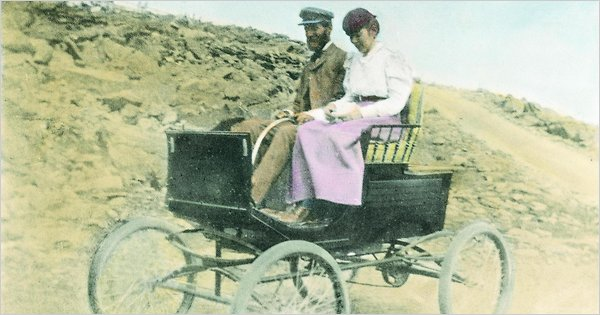
In 1899, an automobile was driven to the summit of Mount Washington, New Hampshire, for the first time.

The world's first long-distance road trip by automobile was in August 1888, when Bertha Benz, wife of Benz Patent-Motorwagen inventor Karl Benz, drove 66 mi (106 km) from Mannheim to Pforzheim, Germany, and returned, in the third experimental Benz motor car, which had a maximum speed of 10 mph (16 km/h), with her two teenage sons Richard and Eugen but without the consent and knowledge of her husband. She had said she wanted to visit her mother, but also intended to generate publicity for her husband's invention, which had only been taken on short test drives before.

In 1899, F. O. Stanley and his wife Flora drove their Stanley Steamer automobile, sometimes called a locomobile, to the summit of Mount Washington in New Hampshire in the United States to generate publicity for their automobile. The 7.6-mile (12.2 km) journey took over two hours (not counting time to add more water); the descent was accomplished by putting the engine in low gear and much braking.

== Driving skills ==
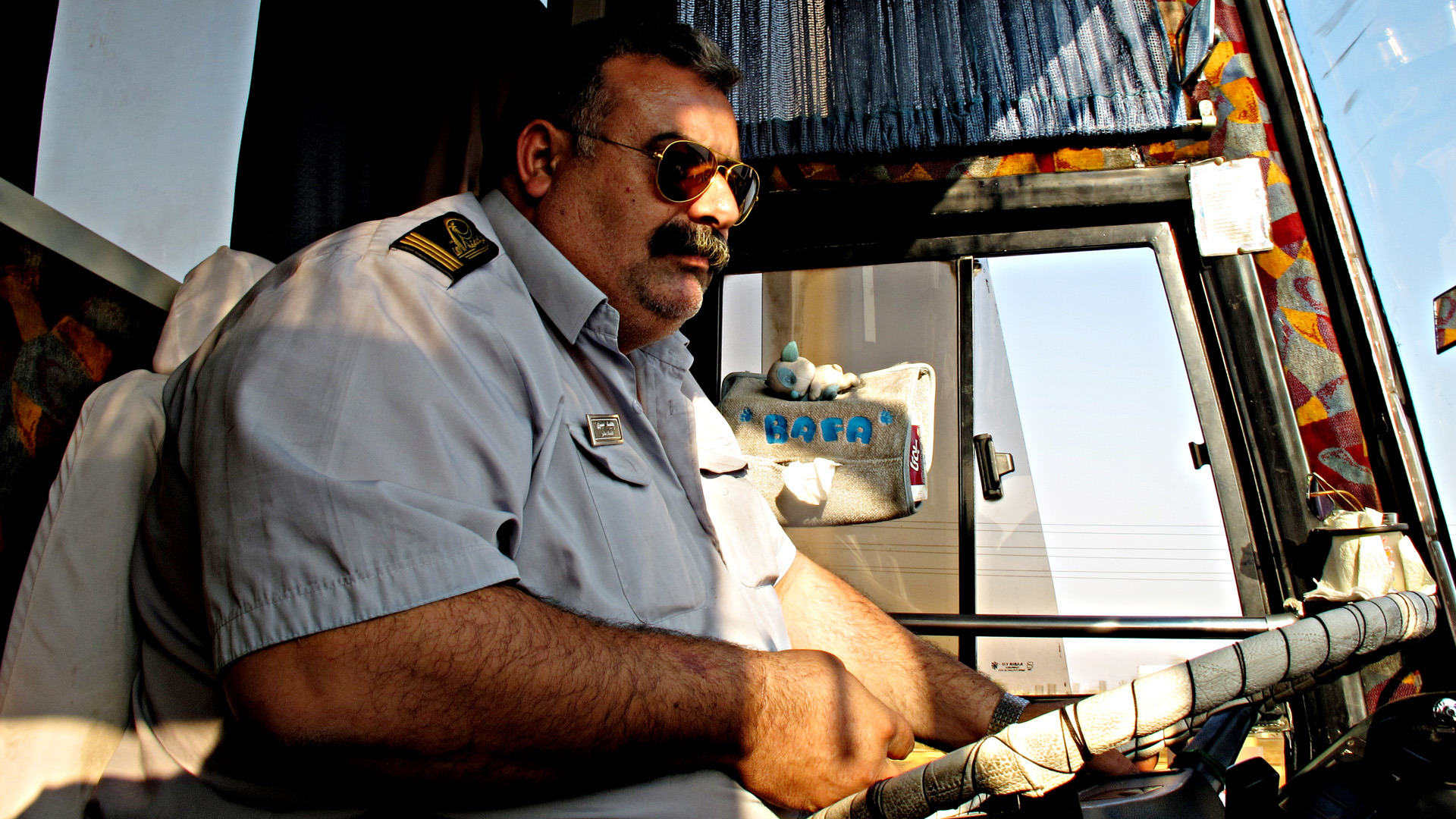
Driving a bus in traffic

Driving in traffic involves both mechanical vehicle operation and the application of traffic laws to regulate sharing of roadway with fellow drivers. It generally requires vehicle handling skills and adherence to road safety regulations

Although direct operation of a bicycle and a mounted animal are commonly referred to as riding, such operators are legally considered drivers and are required to obey the rules of the road. Driving over a long distance is referred to as a road trip.

In many countries, knowledge of the rules of the road, both practical and theoretical, is assessed with one or more driving tests, and those who pass are issued a driver's license.

=== Physical skill ===
Control direction, acceleration, and deceleration

A driver must have physical skills to be able to control direction, acceleration, and deceleration. For motor vehicles, the detailed tasks include:

- Proper hand placement and seating position
- Starting the vehicle's engine with the starting system and ignition switch
- Setting the transmission to the correct gear
- Depressing the pedals with one's feet to accelerate, slow and stop the vehicle and
  - If the vehicle is equipped with a manual transmission, to modulate the clutch
- Steering the vehicle's direction with the steering wheel
- Applying brake pressure to slow or stop the vehicle
- Operating other important ancillary devices such as the indicators, headlights, parking brake and windshield wipers
- Speed and skid control

=== Mental skill ===
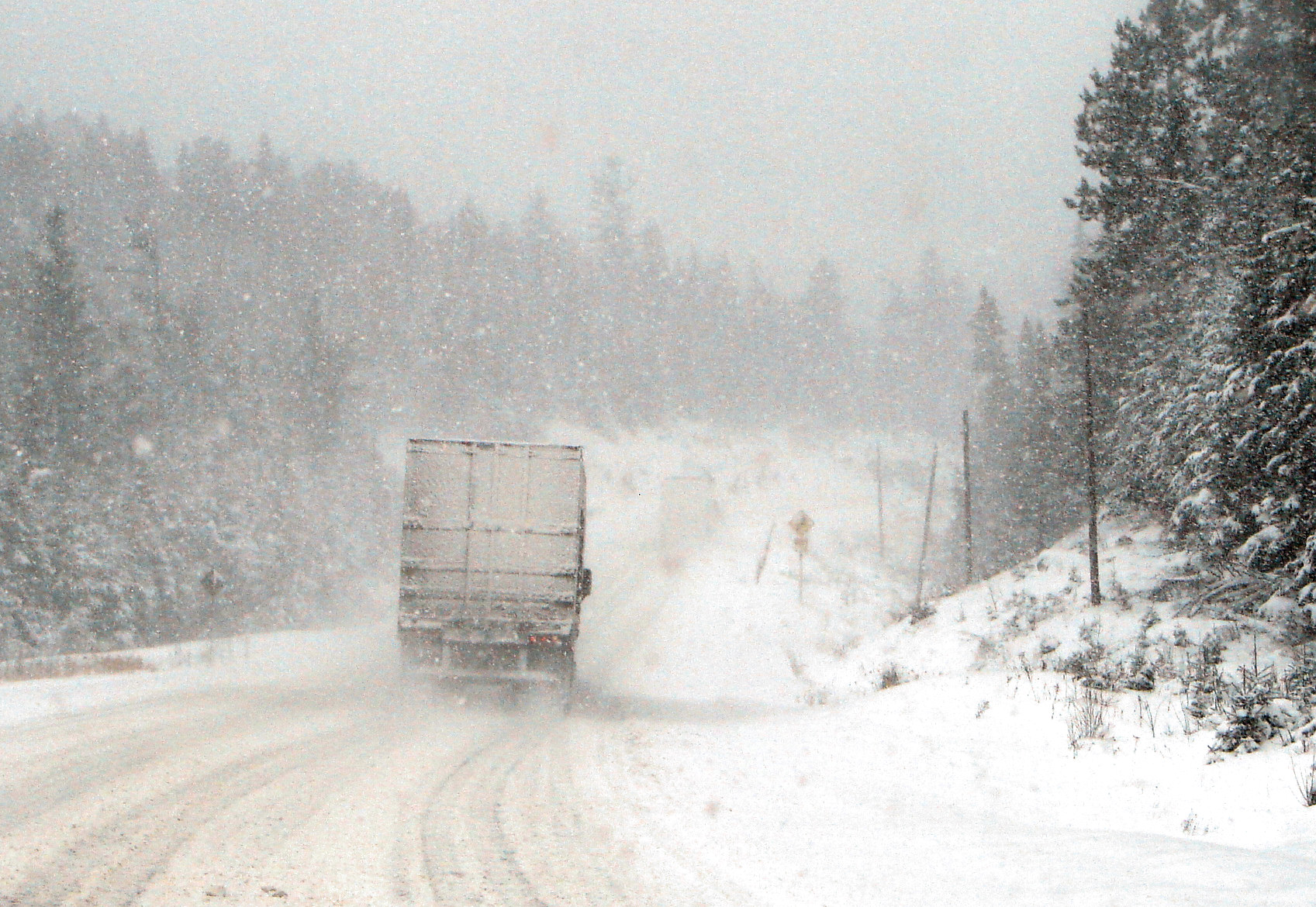
Observing the environment. Driving in a snowy condition can pose serious hazards. The snow affects the dynamics of the car.

Avoiding or successfully handling an emergency driving situation can involve the following skills:

- Observing the environment for road signs, driving conditions, and hazards
- Awareness of surroundings, especially in heavy and city traffic
- Making good and quick decisions based on factors such as road and traffic conditions
- Evasive maneuvering
- Understanding vehicle dynamics
- Left- and right-hand traffic

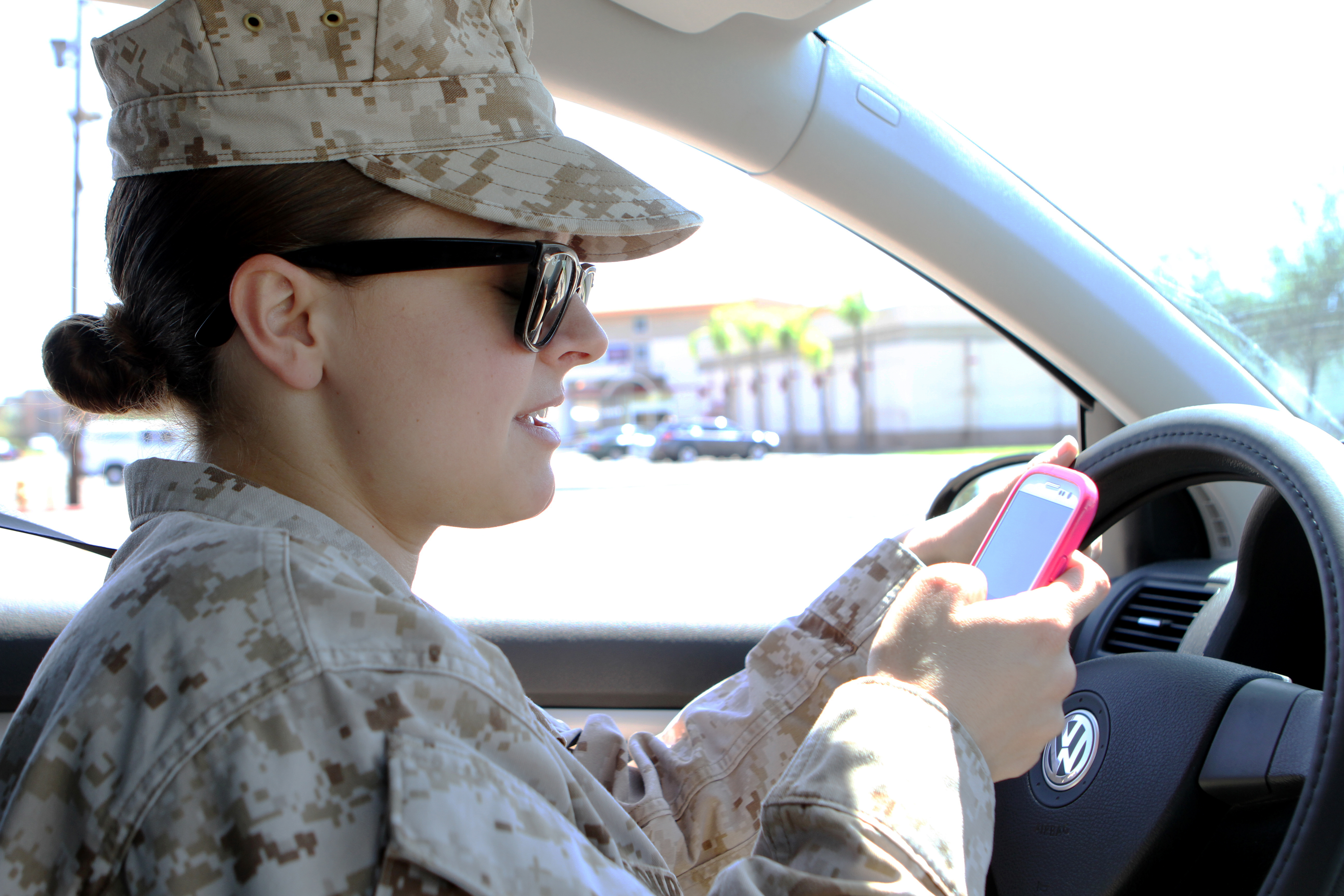
Distracted driving with a cell phone. Restrictions on cell phone usage vary; some U.S. jurisdictions require electronic devices to be placed in a hands-free mount in order to be used while driving, and some disallow specifically the act of texting. Driver distraction is a significant risk factor in traffic. It occurs when attention is diverted away from activities needed for safe driving towards a competing activity —

Distractions can compromise a driver's mental skills, as can any altered state of consciousness. One study on the subject of mobile phones and driving safety concluded that, after controlling for driving difficulty and time on task, drivers talking on a phone exhibited greater impairment than drivers who were suffering from alcohol intoxication. In the United States, according to the National Highway Traffic Safety Administration, it is estimated that 537,946 drivers used their cell phones while driving during daylight hours as of 2024. Another survey indicated that music could adversely affect a driver's concentration.

Seizure disorders and Alzheimer's disease are among the leading medical causes of mental impairment among drivers in the United States and Europe. Whether or not physicians should be allowed, or even required, to report such conditions to state authorities, remains highly controversial.

=== Safety ===
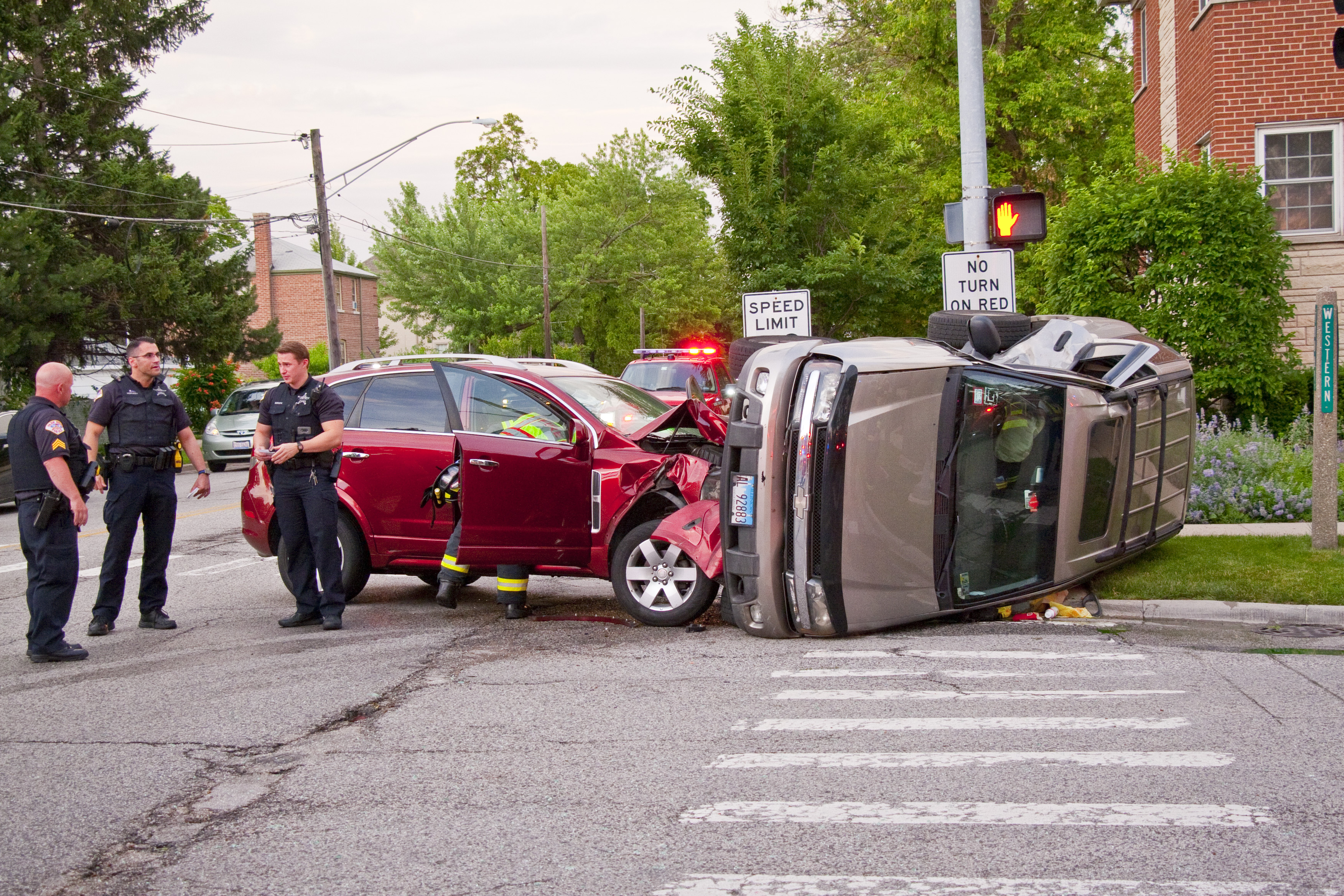
Safety is always the most important thing.

Safety issues in driving include:

- Driving in poor road conditions and low visibility
- Texting while driving
- Speeding
- Drug–impaired driving and driving under the influence
- Distracted driving
- Sleep-deprived driving
- Reckless driving and street racing

== Teenagers ==
There is a high rate of injury and death caused by motor vehicle accidents that involve teenage drivers. There is evidence that the less teenagers drive, the risk of injury drops. There is a lack of evidence as to whether educational interventions to promote active transport and share information about the risks, cost, and stresses involved with driving are effective at reducing or delaying car driving in the teenage years.

== Driveability ==
Driveability of a vehicle means the smooth delivery of power, as demanded by the driver. Typical causes of driveability degradation are rough idling, misfiring, surging, hesitation, or insufficient power.

== Driving laws ==
Drivers are subject to the laws of the jurisdiction in which they are driving.

=== International conventions ===
Some jurisdictions submit to some or all of the requirements of the Geneva Convention on Road Traffic of 1949.

Additionally, the Vienna Convention on Road Signs and Signals standardises road signs, traffic lights and road markings to improve safety.

=== Local driving laws ===
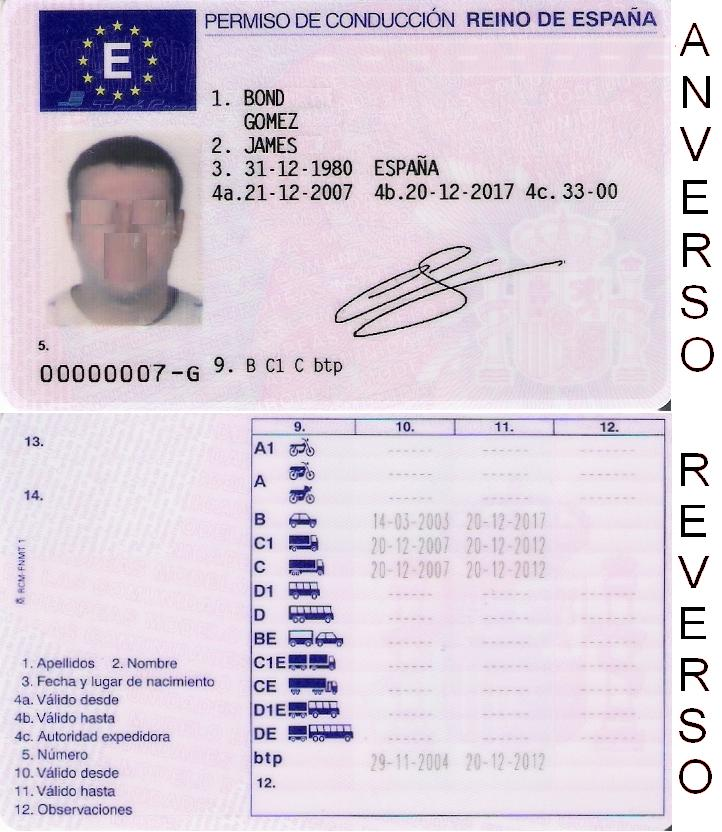
Driver's license from Spain. Spanish driving licenses use a point system.

The rules of the road, driver licensing and vehicle registration schemes vary considerably between jurisdictions, as do laws imposing criminal responsibility for negligent driving, vehicle safety inspections and compulsory insurance. Most countries also have differing laws against driving while under the influence of alcohol or other drugs. Aggressive driving and road rage have become problems for drivers in some areas.

Some countries require annual renewal of the driver's license. This may require getting through another driving test or vision screening test to get recertified. Also, some countries use a points system for the driver's license. Both techniques (annual renewal with tests, points system) may or may not improve road safety compared to when the driver is not continuously or annually evaluated.

==== Ownership and insurance ====
Car ownership does not require a driver's license at all. As such, even with a withdrawn driver's license, former drivers are still legally allowed to possess a car and thus have access to it. In the USA, between 1993 and 1997 13.8% of all drivers involved in fatal crashes had no driver's license.

In some countries (such as the UK), the car itself needs have a certificate that proves the vehicle is safe and roadworthy. Also, it needs to have a minimum of third party insurance.

==== Driver training ====
Drivers may be required to take lessons with an approved driving instructor (or are strongly encouraged to do so) and must pass a driving test before being granted a license. Almost all countries allow all adults with good vision and health to apply to take a driving test and, if successful, to drive on public roads.

In many countries, even after passing one's driving test, new drivers are initially subject to special restrictions under graduated driver licensing rules. For example, in Australia, novice drivers are required to carry "P" ("provisional") plates, while in New Zealand it is called restricted (R). Many U.S. states now issue graduated drivers' licenses to novice minors. While graduated driver licensing rules vary between jurisdictions, typical restrictions include newly licensed minors not being permitted to drive or operate a motorized vehicle at night or with a passenger other than family members, zero blood alcohol, and limited power-to-weight ratio of the vehicle.

== Driving bans ==
It is possible for a driver to be suspended or disqualified (banned) from driving, either for a short time or permanently. This is usually in response to a serious traffic offence (for example, causing death due to drunk driving), repeated minor traffic offences (for example, accruing too many demerit points for speeding), or for a specific medical condition which prevents driving, pending a future assessment (for example, a traumatic brain injury).

Some jurisdictions implement road space rationing, where vehicles are banned from driving on certain days depending on a variety of criteria, most commonly the letters and digits in their vehicle registration plate.

A few countries banned women driving in the past. In Oman, women were not allowed to drive until 1970. In Saudi Arabia, women were not issued driving licenses until 2018. Saudi women had periodically staged driving protests against these restrictions and in September 2017, the Saudi government agreed to lift the ban, which went into effect in June 2018.

== See also ==
- Hands-free driving
- Professional driver
