= Billy Wharton =

American democratic socialist activist and former co-chair of the Socialist Party USA

National Co-Chair of the Socialist Party USA
- In office October 10, 2009 – October 26, 2013 Serving with See list: Andrea Pason (2009-2011) Stephanie Cholensky (2011-2013)
- Preceded by: Jerry Levy
- Succeeded by: Mimi Soltysik

Personal details
- Born: May 5, 1969 (age 56) Pelham Bay, The Bronx, New York City, United States
- Party: Unaffiliated
- Other political affiliations: Socialist
- Occupation: Adult educator, political writer, activist

Billy Wharton (born May 5, 1969) is an adult educator, American democratic socialist activist and former co-chair of the Socialist Party USA. Wharton is best known for his March 15, 2009 article entitled "Obama's No Socialist. I Should Know." In it, he sought to debunk right-wing commentators who claimed that President Barack Obama was a secret socialist. Wharton wrote: "The funny thing is, of course, that socialists know that Barack Obama is not one of us. Not only is he not a socialist, he may in fact not even be a liberal. Socialists understand him more as a hedge-fund Democrat."

The article led to increased media attention that resulted in multiple appearances on Fox Business News and a series of radio interviews including a segment on the CBC. Since then, Wharton's articles have consistently been published in on-line left-wing publications such as "Counterpunch," the "MRZine," "Dissident Voice," "In These Times," "Counter Currents" and "The Indypendent."
