= 2016 Guam Republican presidential caucuses =

- March 12, 2016
Candidate	Uncommitted
Home state	N/A
Delegate count	9
Popular vote	no vote held

The 2016 Guam Republican presidential caucuses took place on March 12 in the U.S. territory of Guam as one of the Republican Party's primaries ahead of the 2016 presidential election.

On the same day, the Republican Party held their Washington, D.C. caucus, while the Democratic Party held a caucus in the Northern Mariana Islands. The Democratic Party's own Guam caucus was held on May 7, 2016.

== Results ==
Guam Republican territorial caucus, March 12, 2016
Candidate	Actual delegate count		
Candidate	Bound	Unbound	Total
Uncommitted	0	9	9
Ted Cruz	0	0	0
John Kasich	0	0	0
Marco Rubio	0	0	0
Donald Trump	0	0	0
Unprojected delegates:	0	0	0
Total:	0	9	9
Source: The Green Papers

Gov. Eddie Calvo, one of the delegates from Guam, had announced his support for Cruz prior to the March 12 Guam caucus. But, the slate of delegates all committed to Trump after both Cruz and Kasich dropped out.

=== Delegates ===
1. Governor Eddie Calvo
2. Territorial Senator Frank Blas Jr.
3. Territorial Senator Tony Ada
4. Juan Carlos Benitez
5. Benny Pinaula
6. Former Territorial Senator Telo Taitague
7. Mike Benito (Republican Party Chairman) (automatically a delegate)
8. David Sablan (National Committeeman) (automatically a delegate)
9. Margaret Metcalfe (National Committeewoman) (automatically a delegate)

== See also ==
- 2016 United States presidential straw poll in Guam
- 2016 United States presidential election
- 2016 Guam Democratic presidential caucuses
