= Mimi Soltysik =

American political activist (1974–2020)

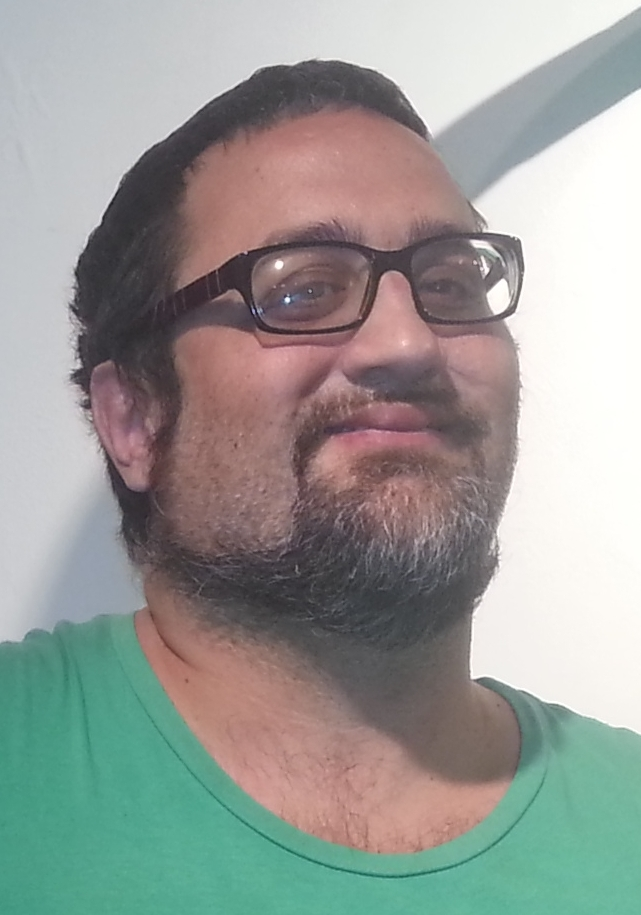
- Soltysik in 2015

National Co-Chair of the Socialist Party USA
- In office October 26, 2013 – October 18, 2015 Serving with Stephanie Cholensky
- Preceded by: Billy Wharton
- Succeeded by: Pat Noble

National Vice Chair of the Socialist Party USA
- In office October 15, 2011 – October 26, 2013 Serving with Stephanie Gussin
- Preceded by: Jim Sanders
- Succeeded by: John Strinka

State Chair of the Socialist Party of California
- In office June 25, 2011 – February 1, 2017
- Preceded by: Office created
- Succeeded by: Lynn Lomibao & Amanda Riggle (as State Co-Chairs)

Personal details
- Born: Emidio Soltysik; October 30, 1974 Reading, Pennsylvania, U.S.
- Died: June 28, 2020 (aged 45) California, U.S.
- Party: Socialist
- Spouse: Lynn Lomibao
- Education: Troy University
- Occupation: Political activist

Emidio "Mimi" Soltysik (/ˌsɒlˈtɪsɪk/ soll-TISS-ik; October 30, 1974 – June 28, 2020) was an American socialist political activist. He was the Socialist Party USA's presidential nominee in the 2016 election, with Angela Nicole Walker, who was the party's vice-presidential nominee.

From October 2013 to October 2015, Soltysik served as national co-chair of the Socialist Party USA. He was also the state chair of the Socialist Party of California from its chartering in 2011 until 2017.

== Personal life ==
Soltysik was born in Reading, Pennsylvania. After high school, Soltysik became a professional musician until his mid-thirties. Speaking of that period, he said in an interview: "I was incredibly self destructive, self absorbed, and almost entirely focused on instant gratification. By the time I reached my early 30s, I felt as if I had bottomed out. Substance abuse had taken a heavy toll on my health, both physically and mentally, and I found myself in a position where I was essentially starting from scratch."

Soltysik then returned to higher education and graduated from Troy University and then went on to earn an MPA degree at California State University, Northridge. He later said "I came to the conclusion that, if the first half of my life was spent tearing humanity down, the second half of my life would be dedicated to making a substantive difference." On June 28, 2020, Soltysik died after a prolonged struggle with liver cancer.

== Political career ==
Soltysik was elected as the male co-chair of the Socialist Party USA for the 2013–2015 term at the party's 2013 national convention. He was also the chair of the Socialist Party of California.

In 2014, Soltysik was one of eight candidates in the primary for California's 62nd State Assembly district. Under California's nonpartisan blanket primary system, the top two candidates from the primary, regardless of party, advance to the general election. Soltysik finished in 7th place with 2.5% of the vote.

In October 2015, Soltysik filed a Federal lawsuit against the California Secretary of State because he had been required to list "Party Preference: None" on the 2014 primary ballot; the California election law allows candidates to list only a party preference of a qualified party or "None" on the ballot, and the Socialist Party was not a qualified party in California. Soltysik argued that restricting which parties could appear on ballots was unconstitutional. The U.S. District Court for the Central District of California dismissed the case in April 2016, finding that the ballot-label restrictions were justified by California's desire to protect the integrity of their elections. Soltysik appealed and the case was heard by the Court of Appeals for the Ninth Circuit. In 2018, they reversed the District Court's decision and remanded the case. Shortly after this, Soltysik's health began to worsen and he withdrew his lawsuit.

In April 2016, Soltysik was interviewed on CNBC regarding growing support for socialism in the United States.

=== 2016 presidential campaign ===
Emidio Soltysik For President 2016
- Campaign: U.S. presidential election, 2016
- Candidate: Mimi Soltysik presidential nominee Angela Walker vice presidential nominee
- Affiliation: Socialist Party
- Status: Announced October 17, 2015 Lost Election November 8, 2016
- Headquarters: 11713 Avon Way #15, Los Angeles, CA 90066
- Receipts: (2015-12-23)

Website
- www.rev16.us (defunct)

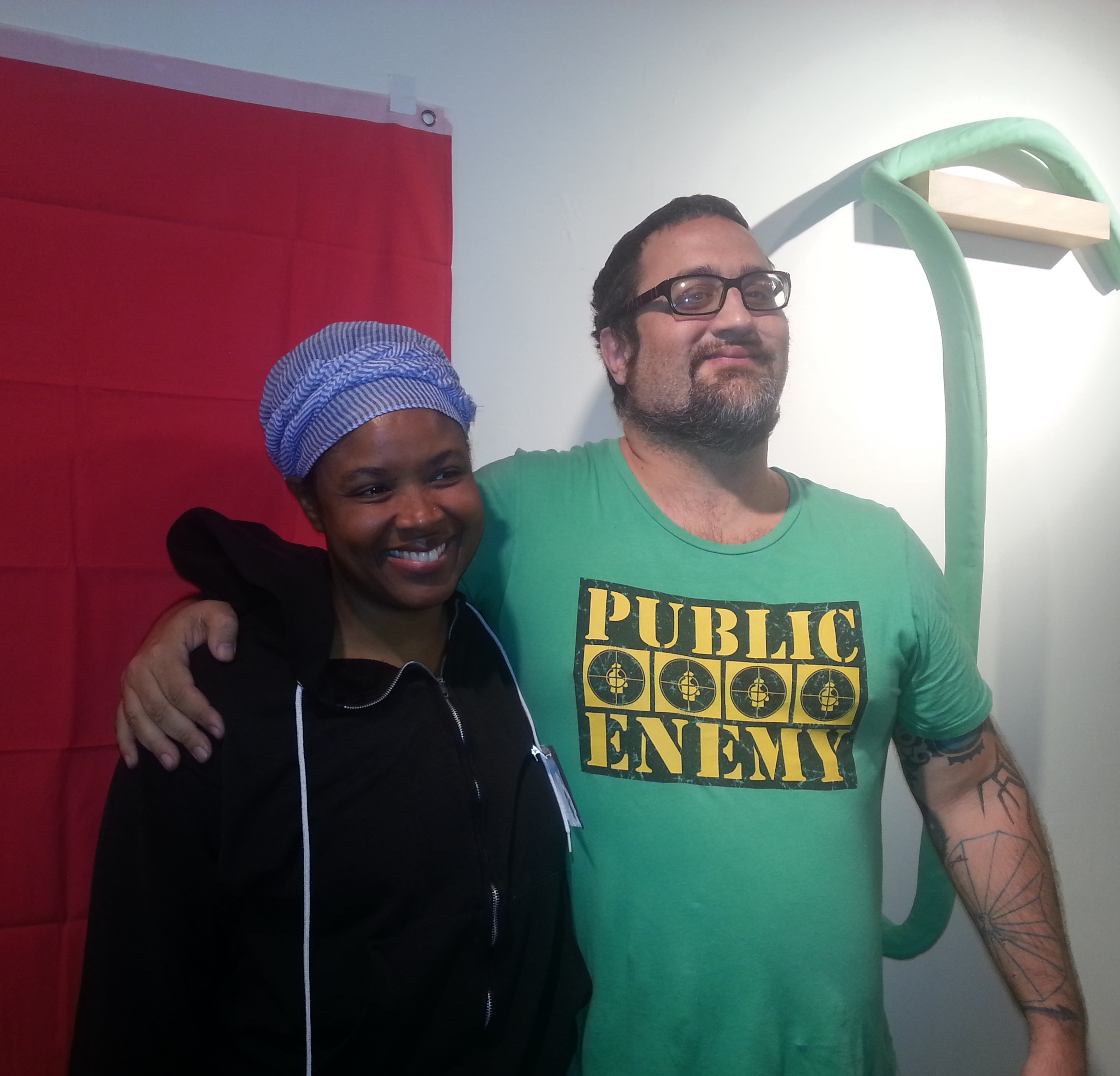
Mimi Soltysik and Angela Walker

On October 17, 2015, Soltysik announced he was running for president, and the Socialist Party USA formally nominated him as their candidate, with Angela Walker as his running mate, at their November 2015 conference in Milwaukee, Wisconsin. The party did not have automatic ballot access in any state, although Soltysik and Walker were on the ballot in Colorado, Michigan, and the U.S. overseas territory of Guam.

Soltysik differentiated himself from other socialist candidates, in that he intended to overthrow capitalism rather than reform it, and sought to build a new system from the "bottom up." He advocated for the abolition of most governmental organizations, such as the CIA, NSA, and NATO. When asked how the United States would defend itself if all these organizations were eliminated, he responded that he believes every threat the US faces is created by their foreign policy. He also believes that one cannot serve as president "without becoming a war criminal" and suggested his first course of action upon taking office would be to "fire ourselves on the first day."

Soltysik made several campaign stops, including in Denver and Philadelphia, Indianapolis, Lancaster, Pennsylvania, Ann Arbor, Michigan, Flint, Michigan, primarily focusing on meeting with and building local networks of community activists.

While campaigning, Soltysik often spoke critically of his political opponent Bernie Sanders, telling the Los Angeles Times that "[Sanders] has had a long history of support for war, and he has also had a healthy support for Israel, which we tend to see as an apartheid state," although he did acknowledge that Sanders' campaign offered "opportunities to introduce different voices into the dialogue."

The Soltysik/Walker campaign received endorsements from multiple socialist and progressive organizations, including Anarcha-transfeminism, the Red Party, and Socialist Action

==== Ballot Access ====
In June 2016, the campaign filed for ballot access in the state of Illinois. Under Illinois law, 25,000 valid signatures are required to secure ballot access for independent and non-qualified alternative parties. However, this requirement is only enforced if a petition's validity is challenged by an Illinois voter. The Soltysik-Walker campaign, which submitted one signature, was challenged by "dissident" Green Party member Rob Sherman, who had also challenged the Socialist Party, Constitution Party and Justice Party petitions in 2012. Because the Soltysik campaign was found to have an insufficient number of signatures, it was removed from the Illinois ballot. On July 28, 2016, the Michigan chapter of the Natural Law Party nominated Soltysik-Walker and gave the ticket its first ballot line in 2016. In September 2016, the campaign became the only alternative party to be listed on the ballot in Guam.

==== Results ====
The Soltysik/Walker ticket received approximately 2,700 (Note: The Federal Election Commission says it was 2,693 votes, but US Election Atlas says 2,705 votes) total votes including write-ins. He also won 4.22% of the vote in Guam's presidential straw poll.

Soltysik/Walker finished in seventh place with 2,209 votes in Michigan, behind other balloted candidates and write-in Evan McMullin. The ticket earned 271 votes in Colorado, 21st place out of a crowded field of 22 on the ballot.

| State or Territory | Vote total | On Ballot or Write-in |
|---|---|---|
| Colorado | 271 | On Ballot |
| Guam (Note: As a territory, Guam does not have any electoral college votes and is thus not counted in the official Federal Election Commission totals) | (1,357) | On Ballot |
| Indiana | 57 | Write-in |
| Michigan | 2,209 | On Ballot |
| New York | 36 | Write-in |
| Texas | 72 | Write-in |
| Wisconsin | 33 | Write-in |
| Scattering | 15 | Write-Ins |
| Total | 2,693 (4,050) | |

== See also ==
- Stewart Alexander presidential campaign, 2012
- Brian Moore presidential campaign, 2008
