= 2016 United States presidential straw poll in Guam =

- November 8, 2016

Non-binding preference poll

Nominee	Hillary Clinton	Donald Trump
Party	Democratic	Republican
Home state	New York	New York
Running mate	Tim Kaine	Mike Pence
Popular vote	23,052	7,779
Percentage	71.62%	24.17%
- Results by village Clinton 60–70% 70–80%

The 2016 United States presidential straw poll in Guam was held on November 8, 2016. Guam is a territory and not a state. Thus, it is ineligible to elect members of the Electoral College, who would then in turn cast direct electoral votes for president and for vice president. To draw attention to this fact, the territory conducts a non-binding presidential straw poll during the general election as if they did elect members to the Electoral College.

The territory still participated in the U.S. presidential caucuses and primaries, like the other states and territories.

Democratic Party nominee Hillary Clinton won the poll with over 70% of the vote. This was the first time since the 1980 straw poll that Guam backed the candidate that lost the presidency.

== Results ==
Though the votes of Guam citizens do not count in the November general election, the territory nonetheless conducts a presidential straw poll to gauge islanders' preference for president every election year. The poll has been held in Guam during every presidential election since 1980. In every election between 1984 and 2012, the outcome of the poll had aligned with the results of the mainland.

Beyond the nominees of the Democratic Party and Republican Party, Socialist Party USA nominee Mimi Soltysik appeared on the 2016 ballot.

The 2016 straw poll favored nominee Clinton over Trump by approximately three to one. It was the first time since the straw poll began in 1980 that the poll failed to predict the outcome of the election (though it did accurately forecast the winner of the popular vote).

2016 United States presidential straw poll in Guam
Party	Candidate	Running mate	Votes	Percentage
Democratic	Hillary Clinton	Tim Kaine	23,052	71.62%
Republican	Donald Trump	Mike Pence	7,779	24.17%
Socialist	Mimi Soltysik	Angela Nicole Walker	1,357	4.22%
Totals			32,188	100.00%

== See also ==
- 2016 United States presidential election
- 2016 Guam Democratic presidential caucuses
- 2016 Guam Republican presidential caucuses
