= 2016 United States presidential election in Michigan =

- November 8, 2016
- Turnout: 63%

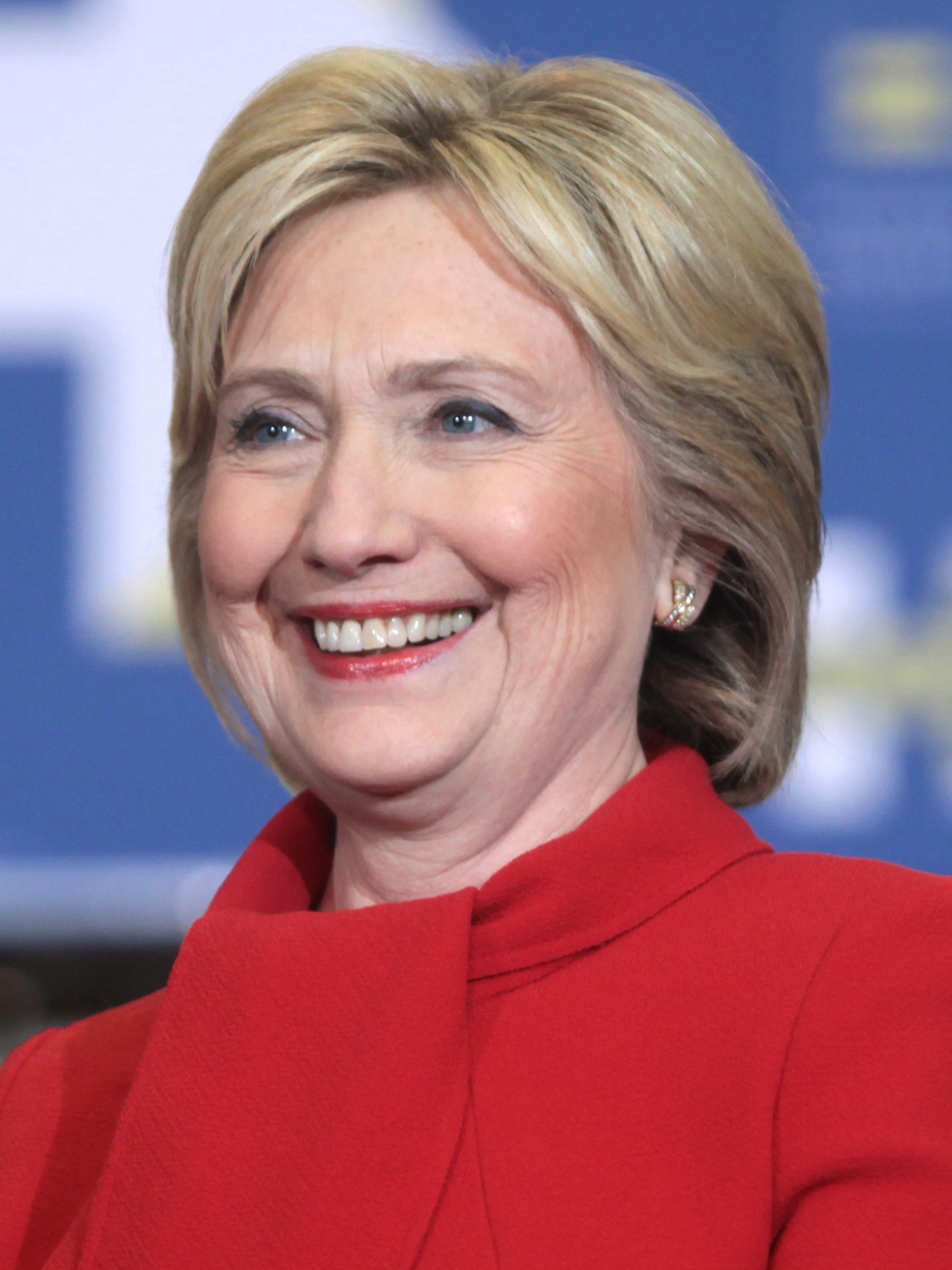
Nominee	Donald Trump	Hillary Clinton
Party	Republican	Democratic
Home state	New York	New York
Running mate	Mike Pence	Tim Kaine
Electoral vote	16	0
Popular vote	2,279,543	2,268,839
Percentage	47.50%	47.27%

Trump
40–50%
50–60%
60–70%
70–80%
80–90%
90–100%
Clinton
40–50%
50–60%
60–70%
70–80%
80–90%
90–100%
Tie/No Votes
President before election
Barack Obama
Democratic
Elected President
Donald Trump
Republican

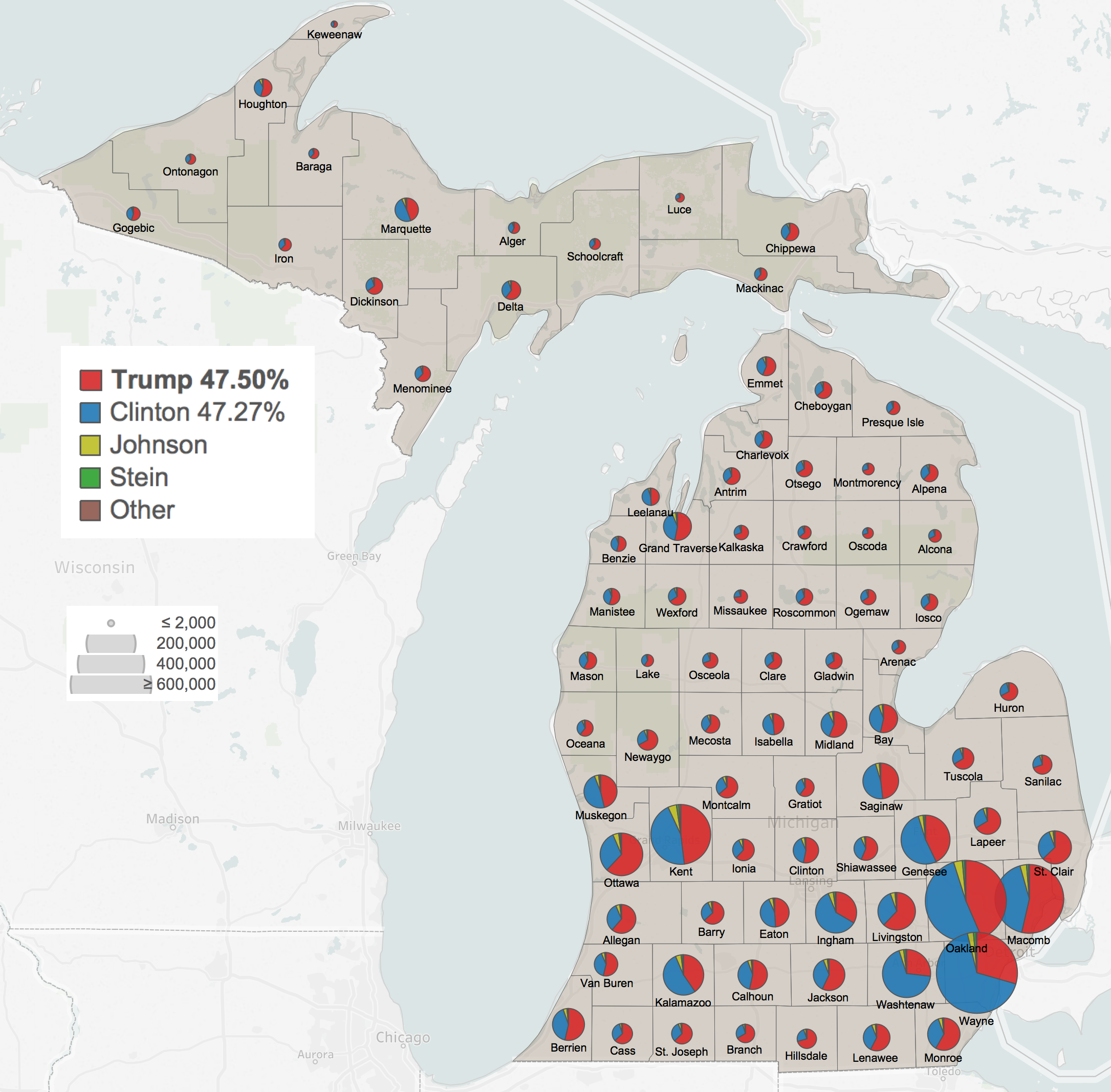
Results by county showing number of votes by size and candidates by color

Treemap of the popular vote by county

The 2016 United States presidential election in Michigan was held on Tuesday, November 8, 2016, as part of the 2016 United States presidential election in which all 50 states plus the District of Columbia participated. Michigan voters chose electors to represent them in the Electoral College via a popular vote, pitting the Republican nominee, businessman Donald Trump, and his running mate Indiana Governor Mike Pence against Democratic nominee, former Secretary of State Hillary Clinton, and her running mate Virginia Senator Tim Kaine. At that time, Michigan had 16 electoral votes in the Electoral College.

Prior to the election, Michigan was considered to be a state Clinton was favored to win. However, Trump unexpectedly won Michigan by a narrow margin of 0.23%, with 47.50% of the total votes over Clinton's 47.27%. This made Michigan 2.33% more Republican than the nation-at-large. The state was the last to be called by most major news networks due to the close nature and the need to count provisional and absentee ballots; most networks declared Trump the winner of Michigan's electors three weeks after Election Day. This is the narrowest margin of victory in Michigan's history in presidential elections, as well as the narrowest margin of any state in the 2016 election. Trump's victory in Michigan was attributed to overwhelming and underestimated support from white working-class citizens in the state's rural areas, a demographic that had previously tended to either vote for the Democratic candidate or did not vote at all. By winning Michigan, Trump became the first Republican presidential candidate to win the state since George H. W. Bush in 1988. Michigan also became one of eleven states to vote for Bill Clinton in 1992 and 1996 which Hillary Clinton lost.

Michigan's largest county, Wayne County, home to Detroit, voted for Clinton by 37 points. She also managed to hold on to suburban Oakland County, the state's second-largest county, where residents tend to be more diverse and more white-collar, where instead third-party candidates gained votes, whilst Trump flipped the state's third largest county, Macomb County, which is home to more socially conservative but economically populist white blue-collar workers. As of the 2024 U.S. presidential election, this is the last time in which Kent County and Leelanau County voted for the Republican candidate, and the only time since 1976 that the Democratic presidential nominee won the nationwide popular vote without winning Michigan.

== Primary elections ==
=== Democratic primary ===
Democratic primary results by county. Bernie Sanders Hillary Clinton

The 2016 Michigan Democratic presidential primary was held on March 8 in the U.S. state of Michigan as one of the Democratic primaries ahead of the 2016 presidential election. On the same day, the Republican Party held primaries in four states, including their own Michigan primary. Bernie Sanders' narrow win was one of the largest upsets in American political history, with polling before the primary showing him trailing Hillary Clinton by an average of 21.4 points.

==== Results ====
Four candidates appeared on the Democratic presidential primary ballot:

Michigan Democratic primary, March 8, 2016
Candidate	Popular vote		Estimated delegates		
Candidate	Count	Percentage	Pledged	Unpledged	Total
Bernie Sanders	598,943	49.68%	67	0	67
Hillary Clinton	581,775	48.26%	63	10	73
Uncommitted	21,601	1.79%	0	7	7
Martin O'Malley (withdrawn)	2,363	0.20%			
Rocky De La Fuente	870	0.07%			
Total	1,205,552	100%	130	17	147

=== Republican primary ===
Four candidates participated in the Republican primary.

2016 Michigan Republican presidential primary
- March 8, 2016
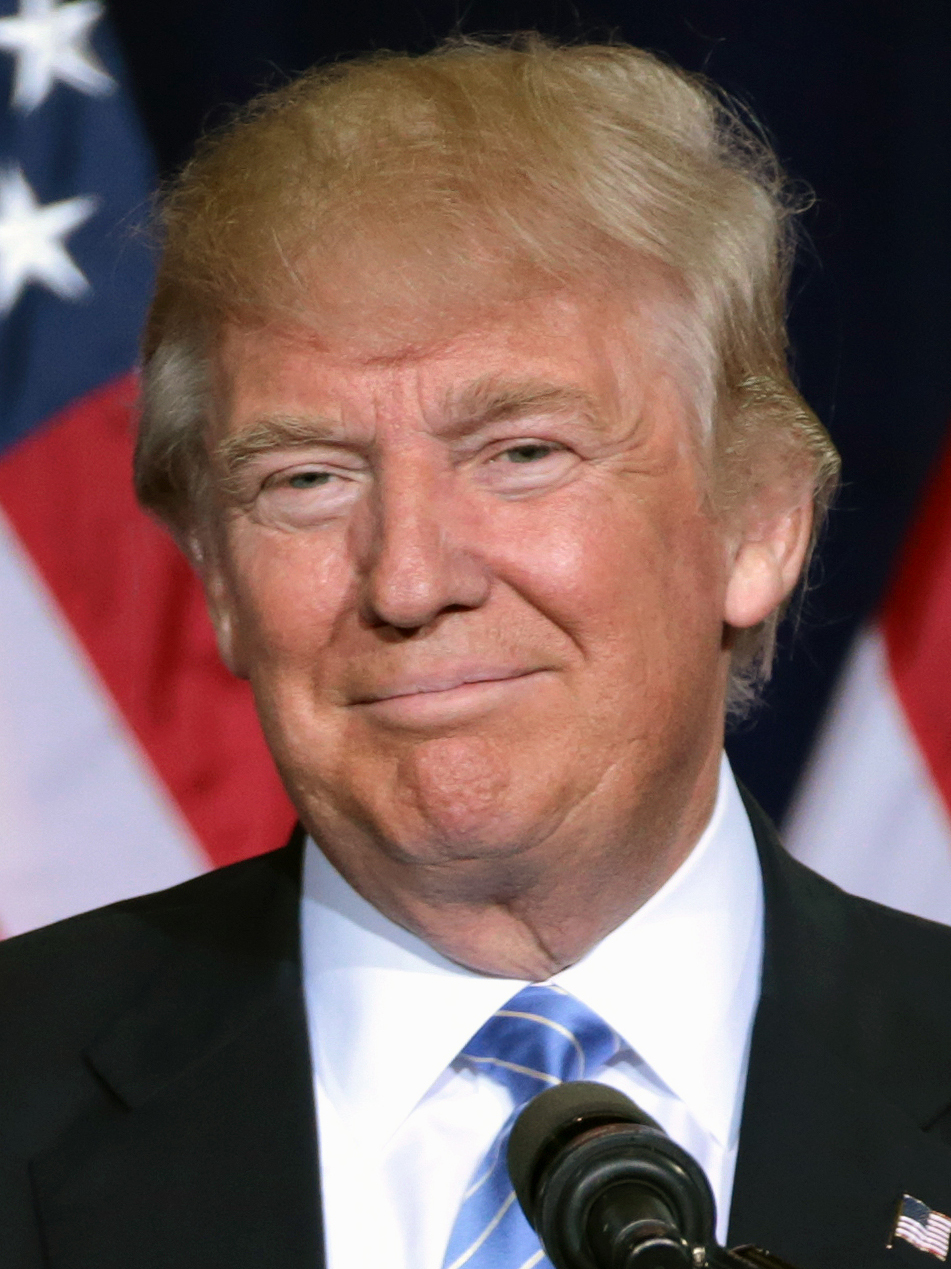

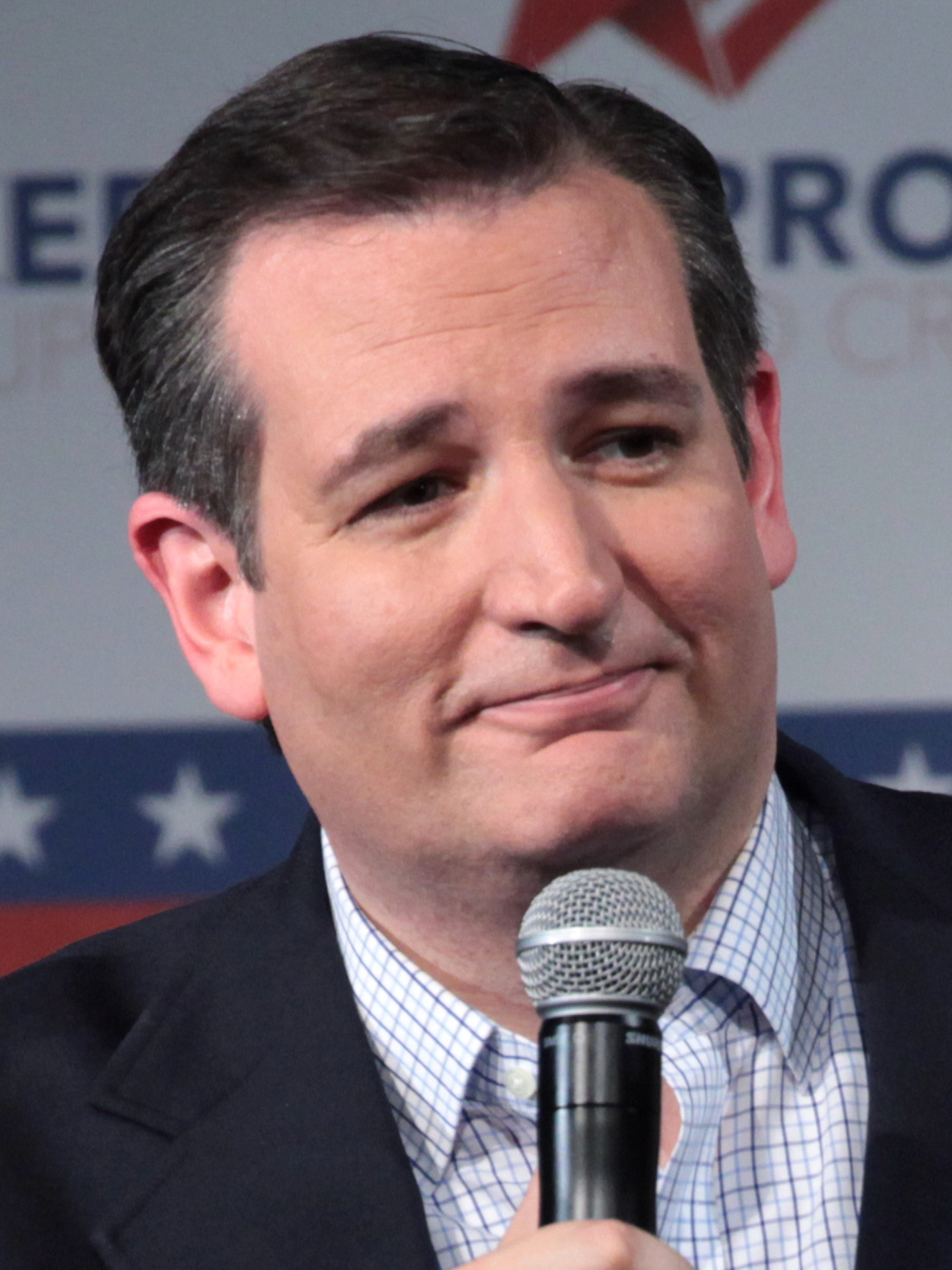

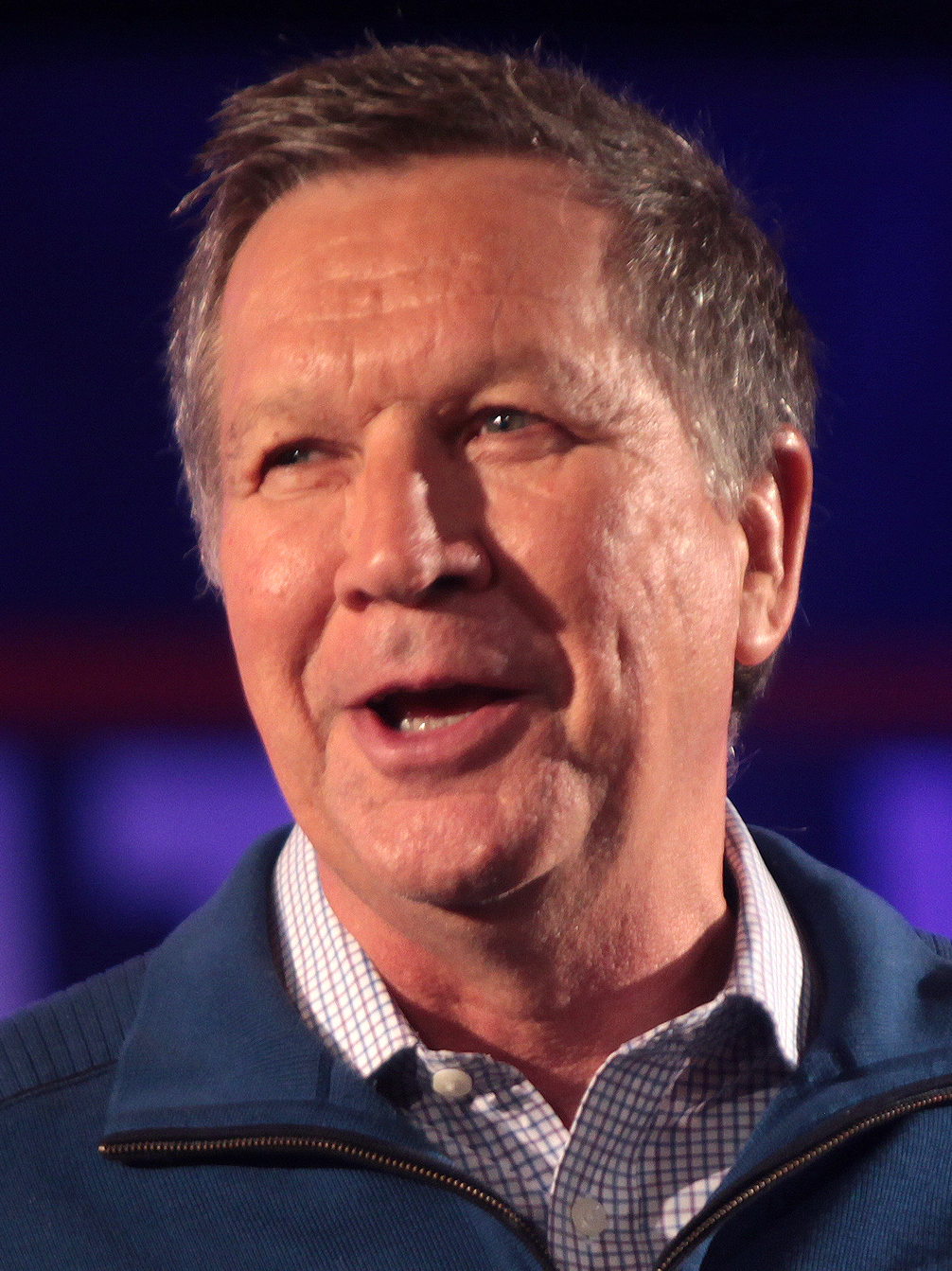

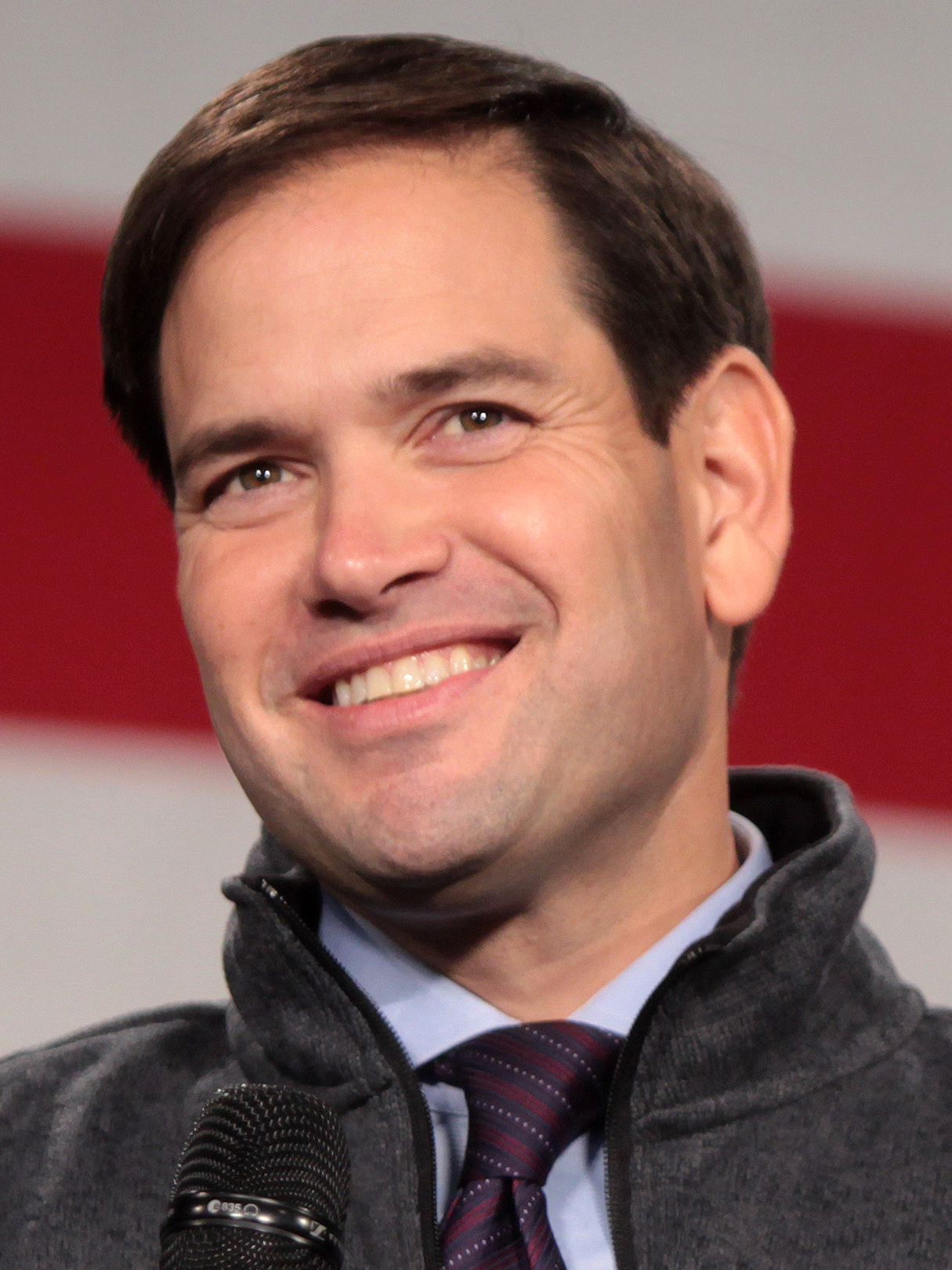
Candidate	Donald Trump	Ted Cruz
Home state	New York	Texas
Delegate count	25	17
Popular vote	483,753	326,617
Percentage	36.55%	24.68%
Candidate	John Kasich	Marco Rubio
Home state	Ohio	Florida
Delegate count	17	0
Popular vote	321,115	123,587
Percentage	24.26%	9.34%

Donald Trump
20–30%
30–40%
40–50%
50–60%
60–70%
70–80%
80–90%
Ted Cruz
20–30%
30–40%
40–50%
50–60%
John Kasich
20–30%
30-40%
40–50%
70–80%
Marco Rubio
30–40%

==== Debate ====
Detroit, March 3

Candidate	Airtime	Polls
Trump	26:40	35.6%
Cruz	19:23	19.8%
Rubio	13:32	17.4%
Kasich	15:20	8.8%

The eleventh debate was held on March 3, 2016, at the Fox Theatre in downtown Detroit, Michigan. It was the third debate to air on Fox News Channel. Special Report anchor Bret Baier, The Kelly File anchor Megyn Kelly and Fox News Sunday host Chris Wallace served as moderators. It led into the Maine, Kansas, Kentucky, Louisiana, Michigan, Mississippi, Idaho, and Hawaii contests. Fox announced that in order for candidates to qualify, they must have at least 3 percent support in the five most recent national polls by March 1 at 5 pm. Ben Carson said on March 2 he would not be attending the debate.

==== Results ====
Thirteen candidates appeared on the Republican presidential primary ballot:

Michigan Republican primary, March 8, 2016
Candidate	Votes	Percentage	Actual delegate count		
Candidate	Votes	Percentage	Bound	Unbound	Total
Donald Trump	483,753	36.55%	25	0	25
Ted Cruz	326,617	24.68%	17	0	17
John Kasich	321,115	24.26%	17	0	17
Marco Rubio	123,587	9.34%	0	0	0
Ben Carson (withdrawn)	21,349	1.61%	0	0	0
Uncommitted	22,824	1.72%	0	0	0
Jeb Bush (withdrawn)	10,685	0.81%	0	0	0
Rand Paul (withdrawn)	3,774	0.29%	0	0	0
Chris Christie (withdrawn)	3,116	0.24%	0	0	0
Mike Huckabee (withdrawn)	2,603	0.20%	0	0	0
Rick Santorum (withdrawn)	1,722	0.13%	0	0	0
Carly Fiorina (withdrawn)	1,415	0.11%	0	0	0
George Pataki (withdrawn)	591	0.04%	0	0	0
Lindsey Graham (withdrawn)	438	0.03%	0	0	0
Unprojected delegates:			0	0	0
Total:	1,323,589	100.00%	59	0	59
Source: The Green Papers

== General election ==
=== Predictions ===
Source	Ranking	As of
Los Angeles Times	Likely D	November 6, 2016
CNN	Lean D	November 4, 2016
Cook Political Report	Lean D	November 7, 2016
Electoral-vote.com	Lean D	November 8, 2016
RealClearPolitics	Tossup	November 7, 2016
Rothenberg Political Report	Lean D	November 7, 2016
Sabato's Crystal Ball	Lean D	November 7, 2016
Fox News	Lean D	November 7, 2016

=== Polling ===
Except for losing one poll in August 2015, and tying with Trump in a poll in September 2015, Clinton won every pre-election poll with margins between 4 and 12 points until November 2016. In late October 2016, Clinton's lead narrowed significantly towards the election. Trump also won the last poll conducted on election day 49% to 47%. The average of the last three polls had Clinton leading Trump 47.6% to 45%. Ultimately, Trump's win here was an extreme surprise.

=== Minor candidates ===
The following were given write-in status:

- Cherunda Fox
- Ben Hartnell
- Tom Hoefling
- Laurence Kotlikoff
- Evan McMullin
- Mike Maturen
- Monica Moorehead

=== Results ===
2016 United States presidential election in Michigan
Party	Candidate	Running mate	Votes	Percentage	Electoral votes
Republican	Donald Trump	Mike Pence	2,279,543	47.50%	16
Democratic	Hillary Clinton	Tim Kaine	2,268,839	47.27%	0
Libertarian	Gary Johnson	Bill Weld	172,136	3.59%	0
Green	Jill Stein	Ajamu Baraka	51,463	1.07%	0
U.S. Taxpayers'	Darrell L. Castle	Scott N. Bradley	16,139	0.34%	0
Independent	Evan McMullin (write-in)	-	8,177	0.17%	0
Natural Law	Mimi Soltysik	Angela Nicole Walker	2,209	0.05%	0
-	Others	-	778	0.01%	0
Totals			4,799,284	100.00%	16

==== By county ====
County	Donald Trump Republican		Hillary Clinton Democratic		Various candidates Other parties		Margin		Total
County	#	%	#	%	#	%	#	%	Total
Alcona	4,201	67.78%	1,732	27.94%	265	4.28%	2,469	39.84%	6,198
Alger	2,585	57.22%	1,663	36.81%	270	5.97%	922	20.41%	4,518
Allegan	34,183	60.91%	18,050	32.16%	3,887	6.93%	16,133	28.75%	56,120
Alpena	9,090	61.55%	4,877	33.02%	801	5.43%	4,213	28.53%	14,768
Antrim	8,469	61.97%	4,448	32.55%	750	5.48%	4,021	29.42%	13,667
Arenac	4,950	64.04%	2,384	30.84%	395	5.12%	2,566	33.20%	7,729
Baraga	2,158	61.34%	1,156	32.86%	204	5.80%	1,002	28.48%	3,518
Barry	19,202	62.92%	9,114	29.87%	2,201	7.21%	10,088	33.05%	30,517
Bay	28,328	53.17%	21,642	40.62%	3,304	6.21%	6,686	12.55%	53,274
Benzie	5,539	54.16%	4,108	40.16%	581	5.68%	1,431	14.00%	10,228
Berrien	38,647	53.65%	29,495	40.95%	3,889	5.40%	9,152	12.70%	72,031
Branch	11,786	66.73%	5,061	28.65%	816	4.62%	6,725	38.08%	17,663
Calhoun	31,494	53.47%	24,157	41.01%	3,251	5.52%	7,337	12.46%	58,902
Cass	14,243	63.04%	7,270	32.18%	1,082	4.78%	6,973	30.86%	22,595
Charlevoix	8,674	59.19%	5,137	35.06%	843	5.75%	3,537	24.13%	14,654
Cheboygan	8,683	63.51%	4,302	31.47%	687	5.02%	4,381	32.04%	13,672
Chippewa	9,122	58.65%	5,379	34.59%	1,051	6.76%	3,743	24.06%	15,552
Clare	8,505	63.24%	4,249	31.59%	695	5.17%	4,256	31.65%	13,449
Clinton	21,636	52.85%	16,492	40.29%	2,809	6.86%	5,144	12.56%	40,937
Crawford	4,354	63.62%	2,110	30.83%	380	5.55%	2,244	32.79%	6,844
Delta	11,121	59.81%	6,436	34.61%	1,037	5.58%	4,685	25.20%	18,594
Dickinson	8,580	64.84%	3,923	29.65%	729	5.51%	4,657	35.19%	13,232
Eaton	27,609	48.80%	24,938	44.08%	4,028	7.12%	2,671	4.72%	56,575
Emmet	10,616	55.89%	6,972	36.71%	1,406	7.40%	3,644	19.18%	18,994
Genesee	84,175	42.59%	102,751	51.99%	10,715	5.42%	-18,576	-9.40%	197,641
Gladwin	8,124	64.77%	3,794	30.25%	624	4.98%	4,330	34.52%	12,542
Gogebic	4,018	54.42%	2,925	39.62%	440	5.96%	1,093	14.80%	7,383
Grand Traverse	27,413	52.73%	20,965	40.33%	3,607	6.94%	6,448	12.40%	51,985
Gratiot	9,880	60.01%	5,666	34.41%	919	5.58%	4,214	25.60%	16,465
Hillsdale	14,095	70.69%	4,799	24.07%	1,046	5.24%	9,296	46.62%	19,940
Houghton	8,475	53.77%	6,018	38.18%	1,268	8.05%	2,457	15.59%	15,761
Huron	10,692	67.06%	4,579	28.72%	673	4.22%	6,113	38.34%	15,944
Ingham	43,868	33.20%	79,110	59.87%	9,157	6.93%	-35,242	-26.67%	132,135
Ionia	16,635	61.52%	8,352	30.89%	2,052	7.59%	8,283	30.63%	27,039
Iosco	8,345	62.14%	4,345	32.36%	739	5.50%	4,000	29.78%	13,429
Iron	3,675	61.66%	2,004	33.62%	281	4.72%	1,671	28.04%	5,960
Isabella	12,338	48.31%	11,404	44.65%	1,798	7.04%	934	3.66%	25,540
Jackson	39,793	56.75%	25,795	36.78%	4,537	6.47%	13,998	19.97%	70,125
Kalamazoo	51,034	40.41%	67,148	53.17%	8,117	6.42%	-16,114	-12.76%	126,299
Kalkaska	6,116	69.24%	2,280	25.81%	437	4.95%	3,836	43.43%	8,833
Kent	148,180	47.66%	138,683	44.61%	24,031	7.73%	9,497	3.05%	310,894
Keweenaw	814	56.76%	527	36.75%	93	6.49%	287	20.01%	1,434
Lake	3,159	58.96%	1,939	36.19%	260	4.85%	1,220	22.77%	5,358
Lapeer	30,037	66.48%	12,734	28.18%	2,412	5.34%	17,303	38.30%	45,183
Leelanau	7,239	48.61%	6,774	45.49%	879	5.90%	465	3.12%	14,892
Lenawee	26,430	57.09%	16,750	36.18%	3,118	6.73%	9,680	20.91%	46,298
Livingston	65,680	61.68%	34,384	32.29%	6,425	6.03%	31,296	29.39%	106,489
Luce	1,756	67.77%	681	26.28%	154	5.95%	1,075	41.49%	2,591
Mackinac	3,744	60.94%	2,085	33.94%	315	5.12%	1,659	27.00%	6,144
Macomb	224,665	53.58%	176,317	42.05%	18,330	4.37%	48,348	11.53%	419,312
Manistee	6,915	54.62%	4,979	39.33%	766	6.05%	1,936	15.29%	12,660
Marquette	14,646	44.09%	16,042	48.29%	2,530	7.62%	-1,396	-4.20%	33,218
Mason	8,505	57.50%	5,281	35.70%	1,006	6.80%	3,224	21.80%	14,792
Mecosta	10,305	59.71%	5,827	33.76%	1,127	6.53%	4,478	25.95%	17,259
Menominee	6,702	61.92%	3,539	32.70%	583	5.38%	3,163	29.22%	10,824
Midland	23,846	55.75%	15,635	36.55%	3,295	7.70%	8,211	19.20%	42,776
Missaukee	5,386	73.61%	1,565	21.39%	366	5.00%	3,821	52.22%	7,317
Monroe	43,261	57.95%	26,863	35.98%	4,531	6.07%	16,398	21.97%	74,655
Montcalm	16,907	63.18%	7,874	29.42%	1,979	7.40%	9,033	33.76%	26,760
Montmorency	3,498	69.52%	1,287	25.58%	247	4.90%	2,211	43.94%	5,032
Muskegon	36,127	45.89%	37,304	47.39%	5,292	6.72%	-1,177	-1.50%	78,723
Newaygo	15,173	66.60%	6,212	27.27%	1,397	6.13%	8,961	39.33%	22,782
Oakland	289,203	43.23%	343,070	51.29%	36,652	5.48%	-53,867	-8.06%	668,925
Oceana	7,228	60.59%	3,973	33.30%	729	6.11%	3,255	27.29%	11,930
Ogemaw	6,827	65.39%	3,030	29.02%	583	5.59%	3,797	36.37%	10,440
Ontonagon	2,066	60.18%	1,176	34.26%	191	5.56%	890	25.92%	3,433
Osceola	7,336	69.15%	2,705	25.50%	568	5.35%	4,631	43.65%	10,609
Oscoda	2,843	69.48%	1,044	25.51%	205	5.01%	1,799	43.97%	4,092
Otsego	8,266	65.55%	3,556	28.20%	788	6.25%	4,710	37.35%	12,610
Ottawa	88,467	61.50%	44,973	31.26%	10,408	7.24%	43,494	30.24%	143,848
Presque Isle	4,488	61.84%	2,400	33.07%	369	5.09%	2,088	28.77%	7,257
Roscommon	8,141	62.16%	4,287	32.74%	668	5.10%	3,854	29.42%	13,096
Saginaw	45,469	47.97%	44,396	46.84%	4,915	5.19%	1,073	1.13%	94,780
Sanilac	13,446	69.85%	4,873	25.32%	930	4.83%	8,573	44.53%	19,249
Schoolcraft	2,556	61.19%	1,369	32.77%	252	6.04%	1,187	28.42%	4,177
Shiawassee	19,230	56.37%	12,546	36.78%	2,335	6.85%	6,684	19.59%	34,111
St. Clair	49,051	62.88%	24,553	31.48%	4,399	5.64%	24,498	31.40%	78,003
St. Joseph	14,884	62.10%	7,526	31.40%	1,557	6.50%	7,358	30.70%	23,967
Tuscola	17,102	65.96%	7,429	28.65%	1,397	5.39%	9,673	37.31%	25,928
Van Buren	17,890	53.77%	13,258	39.84%	2,126	6.39%	4,632	13.93%	33,274
Washtenaw	50,631	26.64%	128,483	67.59%	10,965	5.77%	-77,852	-40.95%	190,079
Wayne	228,993	29.26%	519,444	66.36%	34,282	4.38%	-290,451	-37.10%	782,719
Wexford	10,000	65.06%	4,436	28.86%	934	6.08%	5,564	36.20%	15,370
Totals	2,279,543	47.25%	2,268,839	47.03%	276,160	5.72%	10,704	0.22%	4,824,542

Counties that flipped from Democratic to Republican

- Bay (largest city: Bay City)
- Calhoun (largest city: Battle Creek)
- Eaton (largest city: Charlotte)
- Gogebic (largest city: Ironwood)
- Isabella (largest city: Mount Pleasant)
- Lake (largest village: Baldwin)
- Macomb (largest city: Warren)
- Manistee (largest city: Manistee)
- Monroe (largest city: Monroe)
- Saginaw (largest city: Saginaw)
- Shiawassee (largest city: Owosso)
- Van Buren (largest city: South Haven)

==== By congressional district ====
Trump won nine of 14 congressional districts.

District	Trump	Clinton	Representative
1st	58%	37%	Dan Benishek
1st	58%	37%	Jack Bergman
2nd	56%	38%	Bill Huizenga
3rd	52%	42%	Justin Amash
4th	59%	35%	John Moolenaar
5th	45%	50%	Dan Kildee
6th	51%	43%	Fred Upton
7th	56%	39%	Tim Walberg
8th	51%	44%	Mike Bishop
9th	44%	51%	Sander Levin
10th	64%	32%	Candice Miller
10th	64%	32%	Paul Mitchell
11th	50%	45%	David Trott
12th	34%	61%	Debbie Dingell
13th	18%	79%	John Conyers Jr.
14th	18%	79%	Brenda Lawrence

== Analysis ==
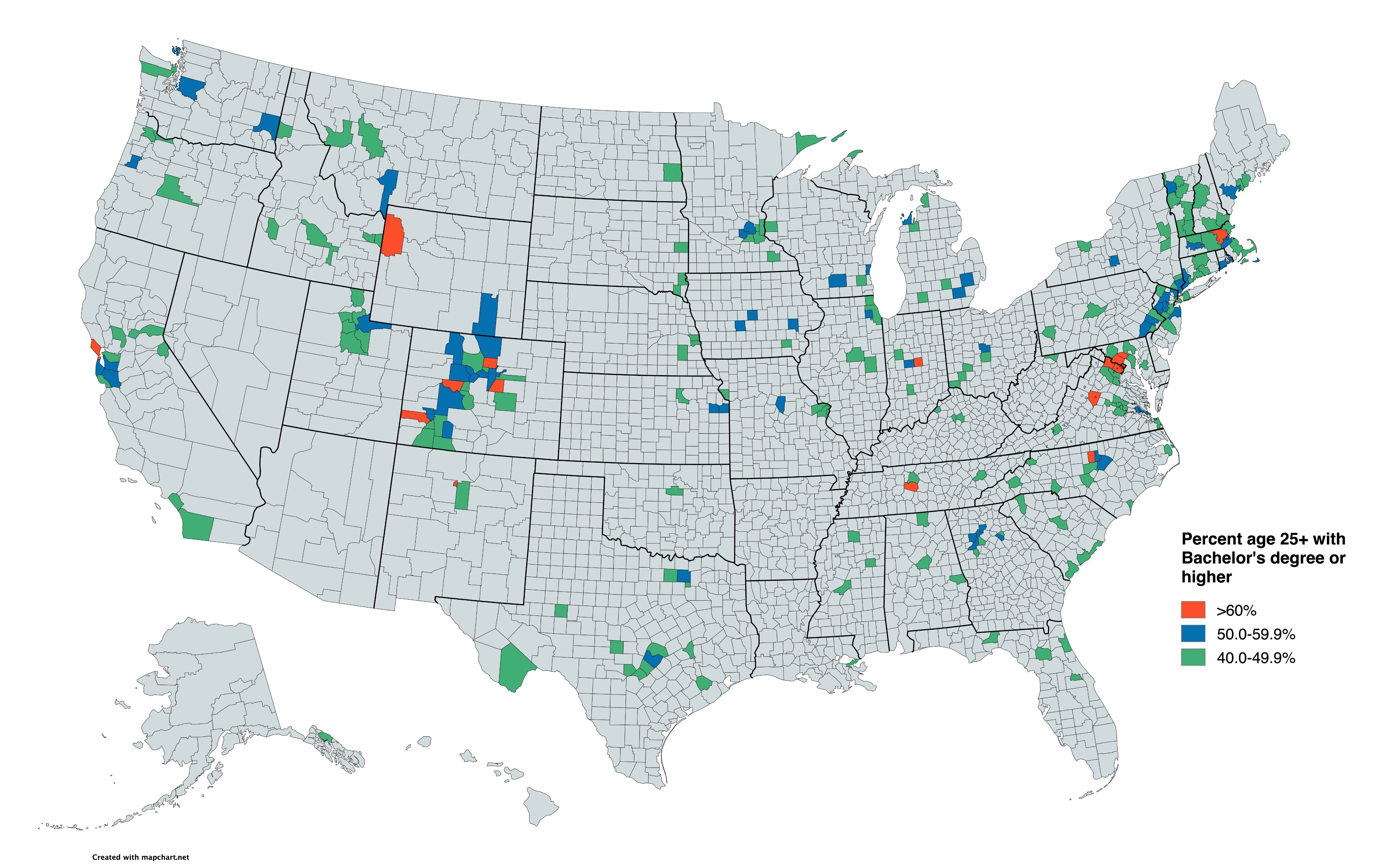
A map of the most college-educated counties in the United States

Although won by Democratic candidates in every election since 1992, sometimes by decisive margins, in 2016 Michigan was considered a swing state and received much attention from Republican candidate Donald Trump. Hillary Clinton's campaign was confident they would win the state, and projected a 5-point win up until election day. Trump was able to win the state for the first time since George H. W. Bush won it in 1988, albeit by a narrow 0.23% margin of victory. On Election Day, Detroit Free Press had prematurely called the state for Clinton at 9:15pm before retracting the call three hours later, an error which had been common in many sources at the 2000 election, in the states of Florida and New Mexico.

Trump was able to flip Michigan, making large gains throughout the state except for a handful of heavily college-educated counties (see the map). In particular, Washtenaw County (home to the University of Michigan), voted to the left of Wayne County (home to Detroit), despite Washtenaw County being just 11.5% Black and Wayne County being 37.3% Black. Washtenaw has continued to vote to the left of Wayne in every presidential election since 2016.

Donald Trump's upset victory highlighted Michigan's new status as a swing state, being bitterly contested in the 2020 election, when former Democratic Vice President Joe Biden narrowly flipped it back into the Democratic column, and in 2024 when Trump flipped it back into the Republican column. Trump's State Campaign was run by Scott Hagerstrom (State Director), CJ Galdes (Deputy State Director), Christopher Morris (Field Director), and Tia Jurkiw^{[unfit]} (Events Coordinator). Trump was the first Republican to win Bay, Lake, and Saginaw counties since 1984, Gogebic County since 1972, and Isabella County since 1988. Wayne County was not the most Democratic county in the state for the first time since 1984 (instead, that distinction was held by neighboring Washtenaw County), which has remained true in every election since.

=== Recount ===
The Michigan Board of Canvassers certified Trump's lead of 10,704 votes over Clinton, a 0.23% margin, on November 28. The deadline to request a recount was then set for November 30 at 2:00 p.m. That same day, Green Party candidate Jill Stein's campaign requested a hand recount, but the recount was halted December 1 after the state received an objection from Trump representatives. The objection was rejected by Michigan's Bureau of Elections on December 2, and a federal judge ordered the recount to start again on December 5. Finally, the recount was halted on December 7 after a federal judge issued an order to Michigan's Board of Elections, thus making Trump's win official.

== See also ==
- United States presidential elections in Michigan
- First presidency of Donald Trump
- 2016 Democratic Party presidential debates and forums
- 2016 Democratic Party presidential primaries
- 2016 Republican Party presidential debates and forums
- 2016 Republican Party presidential primaries
