= 2016 Guam Democratic presidential caucuses =

- May 7, 2016

Candidate	Hillary Clinton	Bernie Sanders
Home state	New York	Vermont
Delegate count	4	3
Popular vote	777	528
Percentage	59.54%	40.46%

The 2016 Guam Democratic presidential caucuses took place on May 7 in the U.S. territory of Guam as one of the Democratic Party's primaries ahead of the 2016 presidential election.

No other primary election was scheduled for this day. The Republican Party's Guam caucus took place on March 12, 2016.

== Results ==
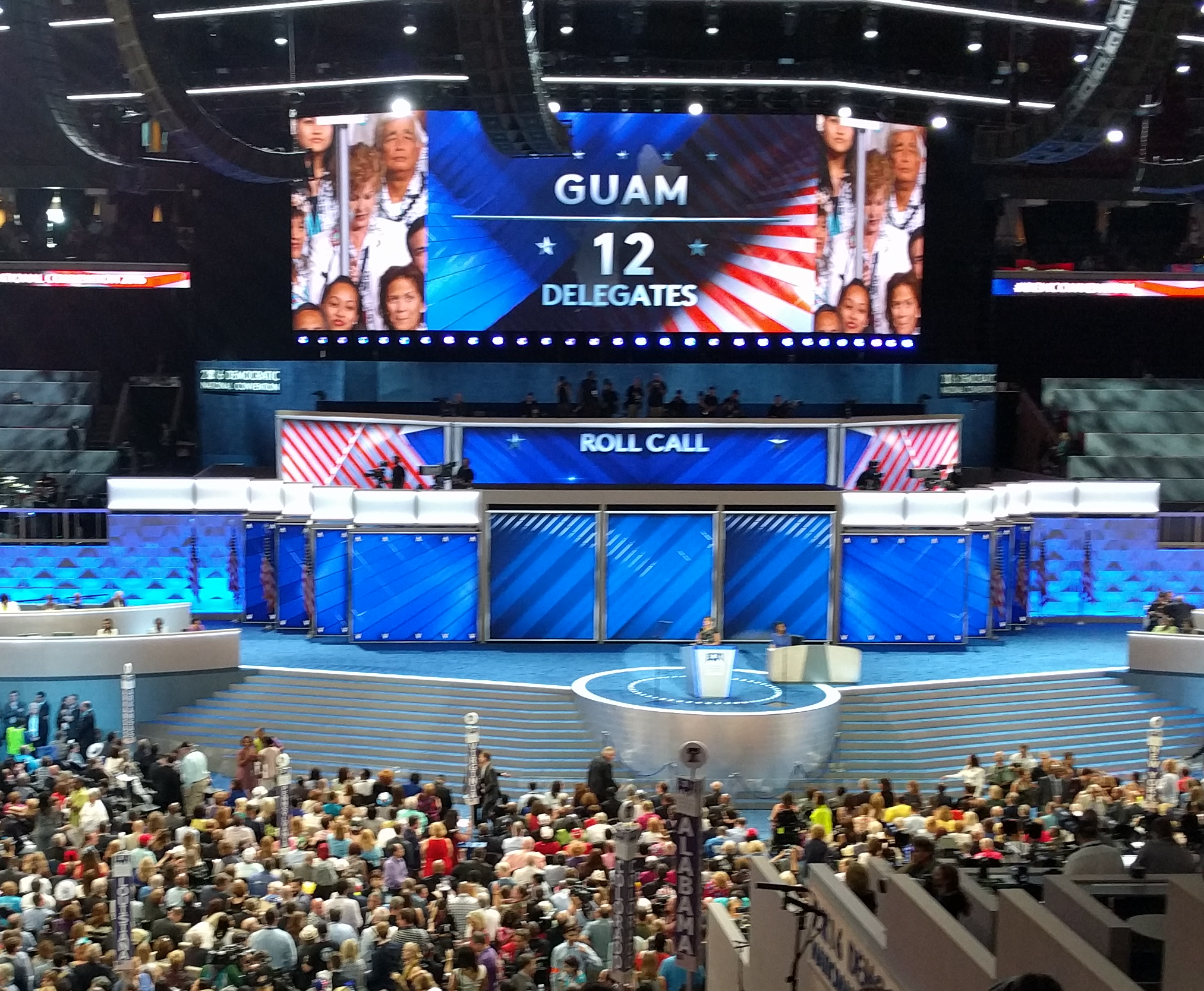
Guam participates in the roll call vote at the 2016 Democratic National Convention

2016 Democratic Party's presidential nominating process in Guam – Summary of results –
Candidate	Popular vote		Estimated delegates		
Candidate	Count	Percentage	Pledged	Unpledged	Total
Hillary Clinton	777	59.5%	4	5	9
Bernie Sanders	528	40.5%	3	0	3
Uncommitted	—N/a		0	0	0
Total	1305	100%	7	5	12

== See also ==
- 2016 United States presidential straw poll in Guam
- 2016 United States presidential election
- 2016 Guam Republican presidential caucuses
