= List of professional driver types =

A professional driver is someone who is paid to drive a vehicle.

== Types of professional driver ==
- Box truck driver
- Bus driver
- Chauffeur
- Coachman
- Delivery (commerce)
- Emergency medical technician (ambulance driver)
- Food delivery for online food ordering
- Motorman (tram/streetcar driver)
- Pay driver
- Racing driver
- School bus driver
- Taxicab driver
- Test driver
- Train driver
- Tricycle taxi
- Truck driver
- Valet parking

== See also ==
- Aircraft pilot
- Maritime pilot
