= List of United States political families (B) =

The following is an alphabetical list of political families in the United States whose last name begins with B.

NOTE: Info may be incomplete.

== Babbitts ==
- James E. Babbitt (1902–1944) Member of Arizona House of Representatives 1933–1936; Arizona State Senator 1937–1944). Brother of John G. Babbitt.
- John G. Babbitt (1908–1993), Arizona State Senator 1944–1949. Uncle of Bruce Babbitt and Paul Babbitt.
  - Bruce Babbitt (born 1938), Attorney General of Arizona 1975–1978, Governor of Arizona 1978–1987, candidate for Democratic nomination for President of the United States 1988, U.S. Secretary of the Interior 1993–2001. Nephew of John G. Babbitt.
  - Paul Babbitt, former mayor of Flagstaff, Arizona and candidate for U.S. Representative from Arizona 2004. Nephew of John G. Babbitt.

== Babcocks and Weekses ==
- Joseph Weeks (1773–1845), Clerk of Richmond, New Hampshire 1802–1822; New Hampshire State Representative 1807–1809 1812–1813 1821–1826 1830 1832–1834; Associate Judge of the Court of Common Pleas in New Hampshire 1823 1827; U.S. Representative from New Hampshire 1835–1839. Grandfather of Joseph W. Babcock.
  - Joseph W. Babcock (1850–1909), Wisconsin Assemblyman 1888–1892, U.S. Representative from Wisconsin 1893–1897. Grandson of Joseph Weeks.

== Bacas ==
- Joe Baca (born 1947), California Assemblyman 1992–1998, California State Senator 1998–1999, U.S. Representative from California 1999–2013, delegate to the Democratic National Convention 2000 2004 2008, Democratic National Committeeman 2008. Father of Joe Baca Jr. and Jeremy Baca.
  - Joe Baca Jr. (born 1969), California Assemblyman 2004–2006. Son of Joe Baca.
  - Jeremy Baca, candidate for Democratic nomination for California Assembly 2006. Son of Jose Baca.

== Bachmanns ==
- Carl G. Bachmann (1890–1980), Prosecuting Attorney of Ohio County, West Virginia 1921–1924; U.S. Representative from West Virginia 1925–1933; candidate for U.S. Representative from West Virginia 1934; delegate to the Republican National Convention 1936 1944 1948 1952; Chairman of the Ohio County, West Virginia Republican Party 1940; candidate for the Republican nomination for U.S. Senate from West Virginia 1940; Mayor of Wheeling, West Virginia 1947–1951; West Virginia Republican Executive Committeeman 1949–1951. Father of Charles F. Bachmann.
  - Charles F. Bachmann (1915–1983), candidate for West Virginia House Delegate 1954, West Virginia House Delegate 1957–1960. Son of Carl G. Bachmann.

== Bacons ==
- Robert Bacon (1860–1919), United States Assistant Secretary of State 1905 to 1909, United States Secretary of State 1909, Ambassador to France 1909 to 1912.
  - Gaspar G. Bacon (1886–1947), delegate to the Republican National Convention 1920 1936 1940, Massachusetts State Senator 1925–1932, Lieutenant Governor of Massachusetts 1933–1935, candidate for Governor of Massachusetts 1934. Son of Robert Bacon.
  - Robert Low Bacon (1884–1938), congressman from New York 1923 to 1938. Son of Robert Bacon.
  - Virginia M. Bacon, delegate to the Republican National Convention 1936. Wife of Robert Low Bacon.

== Bacons of Massachusetts and New York ==
- John Bacon (1738–1820), U.S. Representative from Massachusetts 1801–1803. Father of Ezekiel Bacon.
  - Ezekiel Bacon (1776–1870), Massachusetts State Representative 1805–1806, U.S. Representative from Massachusetts 1807–1813, Chief Justice of the Court of Common Pleas in Massachusetts 1811–1814, Comptroller of the U.S. Treasury 1814–1815, Justice of the Court of Common Pleas in New York 1818, New York Assemblyman 1819, delegate to the New York Constitutional Convention 1821, candidate for U.S. Representative from New York 1824. Son of John Bacon.
    - William J. Bacon (1803–1889), Utica, New York Attorney 1837; New York Assemblyman 1850; Justice of the New York Supreme Court 1854–1870; U.S. Representative from New York 1877–1879. Son of Ezekiel Bacon.

== Bacons and Howards ==
- Augustus O. Bacon (1839–1914), Georgia State Representative 1871–1886, President of the Georgia Democratic Convention 1880, delegate to the Democratic National Convention 1884, U.S. Senator from Georgia 1895–1914. Cousin of William S. Howard.
  - William S. Howard (1875–1953), Georgia State Representative 1900–1901, Solicitor General of Stone Mountain, Georgia 1905–1911; U.S. Representative from Georgia 1911–1919; candidate for the Democratic nomination for U.S. Senate from Georgia 1918. Cousin of Augustus O. Bacon.

== Backus and Woodbridges ==
- William Woodbridge (1780–1860), Ohio State Representative 1807, Ohio State Senator 1813–1815, Secretary of the Michigan Territory 1815–1828, U.S. Congressional Delegate from Michigan 1819–1820, Justice of the Michigan Territory Supreme Court 1828–1832, delegate to the Michigan Constitutional Convention 1835, candidate for U.S. Representative from Michigan 1835, Michigan State Senator 1838–1840, Governor of Michigan 1840–1841, U.S. Senator from Michigan 1841–1847. Father-in-law of Henry T. Backus.
  - Henry T. Backus (1809–1877), Michigan State Representative 1840, delegate to the Michigan Constitutional Convention 1850, Michigan State Senator 1861–1862, Justice of the Arizona Territory Supreme Court 1865–1869. Son-in-law of William Woodbridge.

== Baileys ==
- John Moran Bailey (1904–1975), Chairman of the Democratic National Committee 1961–1968. Father of Barbara B. Kennelly.
  - Barbara B. Kennelly (born 1936), Hartford, Connecticut Councilwoman 1975–1979; Connecticut Secretary of State 1979–1982; U.S. Representative from Connecticut 1982–1999; candidate for Governor of Connecticut 1998. Daughter of John Moran Bailey.
  - James Kennelly, Connecticut State Representative. Husband of Barbara B. Kennelly.
    - John B. Kennelly, Hartford, Connecticut Common Court Councilman. Son of Barbara B. Kennelly and James J. Kennelly.
    - Justin Kronholm, Executive Director of the Connecticut Democratic Committee. Grandson of John Moran Bailey.

== Baileys of Texas ==
- Joseph W. Bailey (1862–1929), U.S. Representative from Texas 1891–1901, U.S. Senator from Texas 1901–1913, candidate for Governor of Texas 1920. Father of Joseph W. Bailey Jr.
  - Joseph W. Bailey Jr. (1892–1943), U.S. Representative from Texas 1933–1935, candidate for the Democratic nomination for U.S. Senate from Texas 1934. Son of Joseph W. Bailey.

== Bairds ==
- David Baird (1839–1927), Sheriff of Camden County, New Jersey 1887–1889 1895–1897; candidate for U.S. Senate from New Jersey 1910; U.S. Senator from New Jersey 1918–1919. Father of David Baird Jr.
  - David Baird Jr. (1881–1955), U.S. Senator from New Jersey 1929–1930, candidate for Governor of New Jersey 1931. Son of David Baird.

== Bairds of Indiana ==
- Jim Baird (born 1945), Member of the Putnam County Commission 2006–2010, Indiana State Representative 2010–2018, U.S. Representative from Indiana 2019–present.
  - Beau Baird, Indiana State Representative 2018–present. Son of Jim Baird.

== Bairds of North Carolina ==
- Zebulon Baird (1764–1824), member of the North Carolina Senate
  - Mira Margaret Baird Vance (1802–1878), farmer. Daughter of Zebulon Baird.
    - Robert B. Vance (1828–1899), U.S. Representative from North Carolina 1873–1885, North Carolina State Representative 1894–1896. Son of Mira Margaret Baird Vance.
    - Zebulon Baird Vance (1830–1894), Prosecuting Attorney of Buncombe County, North Carolina 1852; member of the North Carolina House of Commons 1854; candidate for North Carolina State Senate 1856; candidate for U.S. Representative from North Carolina 1856; U.S. Representative from North Carolina 1858–1861; Governor of North Carolina 1862–1865 and 1877–1879; candidate for U.S. Senate from North Carolina 1872; U.S. Senator from North Carolina 1879–1894. Son of Mira Margaret Baird Vance.
    - Harriett Newell Espy Vance (1832–1878), First Lady of North Carolina 1862–1865 and 1877–1878. First wife of Zebulon Baird Vance.
    - Florence Steele Martin Vance (1840–1924), heiress. Second wife of Zebulon Baird Vance.

== Bakers, Dirksens, and Landons ==
- Howard Baker Sr. (1902–1964), Tennessee State Representative, Member of Scott County, Tennessee Board of Education 1931–1932, District Attorney for 19th Circuit of Tennessee 1932–1938, candidate for Governor of Tennessee 1939, candidate for U.S. Senator from Tennessee 1940, delegate to the Republican National Convention 1940 1948 1952 1956, U.S. Representative from Tennessee 1951–1964. Father of Howard Baker.
- Irene Baker (1901–1994), Republican National Committeewoman 1960–1964, U.S. Representative from Tennessee 1964–1965. Wife of Howard Baker Sr.
- Everett Dirksen (1896–1969), U.S. Representative from Illinois 1933–1949, U.S. Senator from Illinois 1951–1969, Chairman of the Republican National Committee 1953–1955 1957–1959. Father-in-law of Howard Baker.
- Alf Landon (1887–1987), Chairman of the Kansas Central Committee, Governor of Kansas 1933–1937, candidate for President of the United States 1936. Father-in-law of Howard Baker.
  - Howard Baker (1925–2014), candidate for U.S. Senate from Tennessee 1964, U.S. Senator from Tennessee 1967–1985, White House Chief of Staff 1987–1989, U.S. Ambassador to Japan 2001–2005. Son of Howard Baker Sr.
  - Nancy Kassebaum Baker (born 1932), U.S. Senator from Kansas 1978–1997. Wife of Howard Baker.
    - William Kassebaum (born 1962), Kansas House of Representatives 2002–2004. Son of Nancy Kassebaum Baker.

== Bakers of Indiana ==
- William Baker (1813–1872), Pennsylvania State Representative 1847–1849, Mayor of Evansville, Indiana 1859–1868 1870–1872. Brother of Conrad Baker.
- Conrad Baker (1817–1885), Indiana State Representative 1845–1846, Indiana Circuit Court Judge 1852–1853, candidate for Lieutenant Governor of Indiana 1856, Lieutenant Governor of Indiana 1865–1867, Governor of Indiana 1867–1873. Brother of William Baker.

== Bakers of Indiana and Kansas ==
- John Baker (1832–1915), Indiana State Senator 1862, U.S. Representative from Indiana 1875–1881, delegate to the Republican National Convention 1888, U.S. District Court Judge of Indiana 1892–1904. Brother of Lucien Baker.
  - Francis Elisha Baker (1860–1924), Justice of the Indiana Supreme Court 1899–1902, Judge of the U.S. Court of Appeals 1902–1924. Son of John Baker.
- Lucien Baker (1846–1907), Attorney of Leavenworth, Kansas 1872–1874; U.S. Senator from Kansas 1895–1901. Brother of John Baker.

== Baldaccis and Mitchells ==
- George J. Mitchell (born 1933), candidate for Governor of Maine 1974, U.S. Attorney of Maine 1977–1979, U.S. District Judge of Maine 1979–1980, U.S. Senator from Maine 1980–1995, U.S. Special Envoy to Northern Ireland 1995–2000, U.S. Special Envoy to the Middle East 2009–present. Cousin of John Baldacci.
- John Baldacci (born 1955), Bangor, Maine Councilman 1978–1982; Maine State Senator 1982–1994; U.S. Representative from Maine 1995–2003, Governor of Maine 2003–2011. Cousin of George J. Mitchell.

== Baldriges ==
- Howard Hammond Baldrige (1864–1928), Nebraska state senator. Father of Howard M. Baldrige.
  - Howard M. Baldrige (1894–1985), Nebraska state representative 1923, delegate to the Republican National Convention 1924 1928, U.S. Representative from Nebraska 1931–1933. Son of Howard Hammond Baldrige.
    - Howard M. Baldrige Jr. (1922–1987), U.S. Secretary of Commerce 1981–1987. Son of Howard M. Baldrige.
  - Thomas J. Baldrige (1872–1963), Pennsylvania Attorney General 1927–1929, Pennsylvania Superior judge 1929–1947. Nephew of Howard Hammond Baldrige

== Baldwins ==
- Joseph G. Baldwin (1815–1864), Alabama State Representative 1843–1849, Associate Justice of the California Supreme Court 1858–1862.
  - Alexander W. Baldwin (1835–1869), Judge of the United States District Court for the District of Nevada 1865–1869. Son of Joseph G. Baldwin.

== Baldwins and Barlows ==
- Abraham Baldwin (1754–1807), Georgia State Representative 1785, Delegate to the Continental Congress from Georgia 1785 1787 1788, U.S. Representative from Georgia 1789–1799, U.S. Senator from Georgia 1799–1807. Brother of Henry Baldwin.
- Henry Baldwin (1780–1844), U.S. Representative from Pennsylvania 1817–1822, Justice of the U.S. Supreme Court 1830–1844. Brother of Abraham Baldwin.
- Joel Barlow (1754–1812), U.S. Consul to Cádiz, Spain 1792–1893; U.S. Consul General to Algiers, Algeria 1795–1797; U.S. Minister to France 1811–1812. Brother-in-law of Abraham Baldwin and Henry Baldwin.

== Ballances ==
- Frank Ballance (1942–2019), North Carolina State Representative 1982–1985, North Carolina State Senator 1989–2002, U.S. Representative from North Carolina 2003–2004. Father of Garey M. Ballance.
  - Garey M. Ballance, North Carolina District Court Judge. Son of Frank Ballance.

== Ballards ==
- Bland Ballard (1761–1853), Kentucky state delegate 1800, 1803 and 1805.
  - Bland Ballard (1819–1879), Judge of the United States District Court for the District of Kentucky 1861–1879. Nephew of Bland Ballard.

== Bambergers ==
- Simon Bamberger (1846–1926), Utah State Senator 1903–1907, delegate to the Democratic National Convention 1904 1924, Governor of Utah 1917–1921. Father of Julian Bamberger.
  - Julian Bamberger (1889–1967), Utah State Senator. Son of Simon Bamberger.

== Bankheads and Brockmans ==
Three Senators and one Speaker of the House.

- Brockmans
  - Thomas Patterson Brockman (1797–1859), South Carolina State Senator; maternal great-grandfather of John H. Bankhead II and William B. Bankhead
- Bankheads
  - John H. Bankhead (1842–1920), Senator from Alabama; father of John H. Bankhead II and William B. Bankhead, grandson-in-law of Thomas Patterson Brockman
  - John H. Bankhead II (1872–1946), Senator from Alabama
    - Walter Will Bankhead (1897–1988), delegate to the Democratic National Convention 1940, U.S. Representative from Alabama 1941. Son of John H. Bankhead II.
  - William Brockman Bankhead (1874–1940), Speaker of the United States House of Representatives; father of actress Tallulah Bankhead

== Bankstons ==
- Jesse Bankston (1907–2010), Member, secretary, and chairman of the Louisiana Board of Elementary and Secondary Education from Louisiana's 6th congressional district 1968–1996, Member and former chairman of the Louisiana State Democratic Central Committee 1960–2010, father of Larry S. Bankston
  - Larry S. Bankston (born 1951), member of the Baton Rouge City-Parish Commission 1982–1988, Louisiana State Senator from East Baton Rouge Parish 1988–1996, son of Jesse Bankston

== Barbers ==
- Noyes Barber (1781–1844), Connecticut State Representative 1818, U.S. Representative from Connecticut 1821–1835. Uncle of Edwin Barber Morgan and Christopher Morgan.
  - Edwin Barber Morgan (1806–1881), U.S. Representative from New York 1853–1859. Nephew of Noyes Barber.
  - Christopher Morgan (1808–1877), U.S. Representative from New York 1839–1843, New York Secretary of State 1847–1851, Mayor of Auburn, New York 1860 1862. Nephew of Noyes Barber.

== Barbours ==
- Thomas Barbour, member of the Virginia House of Burgesses. Father of James Barbour and Philip Pendleton Barbour.
- Benjamin Johnson, member of the Virginia House of Burgesses. Father-in-law of James Barbour.
  - James Barbour (1775–1842), Virginia House Delegate 1796–1812, candidate for Governor of Virginia 1811, Governor of Virginia 1812–1814, U.S. Senator from Virginia 1815–1825, U.S. Secretary of War 1825–1828, U.S. Minister to Great Britain 1828–1829. Son of Thomas Barbour.
  - Philip P. Barbour (1783–1841), U.S. Representative from Virginia 1814–1825 1827–1830, Speaker of the U.S. House of Representatives 1821–1823, Justice of the U.S. Supreme Court 1836–1841. Son of Thomas Barbour.
  - John S. Barbour (1790–1855), Virginia House Delegate 1813–1816 1820–1823 1833–1834, U.S. Representative from Virginia 1823–1833, delegate to the Virginia Constitutional Convention 1829 1830, Chairman of the Democratic National Convention 1852. Nephew of Thomas Barbour.
    - John S. Barbour Jr. (1820–1892), Virginia House Delegate 1847–1851, U.S. Representative from Virginia 1881–1887, U.S. Senator from Virginia 1889–1892. Son of John S. Barbour.

== Barcelós ==
- Antonio R. Barceló (1868–1938), Puerto Rico Commonwealth Senator. Grandfather of Carlos Romero Barceló.
  - Carlos Romero Barceló (1932–2021), Mayor of San Juan, Puerto Rico 1969–1976; Governor of Puerto Rico 1977–1985; Puerto Rico Commonwealth Senator 1986–1989; Resident Commissioner of Puerto Rico to the U.S. Congress 1993–2001. Grandson of Antonio R. Barceló.

== Barhams ==
- C. E. "Cap" Barham (1904–1972), Lieutenant governor of Louisiana 1952–1956, Louisiana State Senator from Lincoln Parish 1948–1952, father of Charles C. Barham
  - Charles C. Barham (1934–2010), Louisiana State Senator from Lincoln Parish 1964–1972, 1976–1988, son of C. E. Barham

== Barksdales ==
- William Barksdale (1821–1863), delegate to the Democratic National Convention 1852, U.S. Senator from Mississippi 1853–1861. Brother of Ethelbert Barksdale.
- Ethelbert Barksdale (1824–1893), delegate to the Democratic National Convention 1860 1868 1872 1880, Confederate States Representative from Mississippi 1861–1865, Chairman of the Mississippi Democratic Committee 1877–1879, U.S. Representative from Mississippi 1883–1887. Brother of William Barksdale.

NOTE: Ethelbert Barksdale was also brother-in-law of Confederate States politician James B. Owens.

== Barlows, Smalleys, and Jacksons ==
- Bradley Barlow (1814–1889), Vermont State Representative 1845 1850–1852 1864–1865, U.S. Representative from Vermont 1879–1881.
- David Allen Smalley (1809–1877), Chairman of the Democratic National Committee 1856–1860, Judge of the United States District Court for the District of Vermont 1857–1877. Brother-in-law of Bradley Barlow.
  - John Holmes Jackson (1871–1944), Mayor of Burlington, Vermont 1917–1925 1929–1933, Vermont State Representative 1921–1923. Grandson-in-law of David Allen Smalley.
  - Hollister Jackson (1875–1927), State's Attorney of Washington County, Vermont 1904–1906, Vermont State Representative 1906–1907, Lieutenant Governor of Vermont 1927. Brother of John Holmes Jackson.

== Barnes of Michigan ==
- Orlando M. Barnes (1824–1899), Michigan State Representative 1863–1864, Mayor of Lansing, Michigan 1877; candidate for Governor of Michigan 1878. Father of Orlando F. Barnes.
  - Orlando F. Barnes (1856–1937), Mayor of Lansing, Michigan 1883. Son of Orlando M. Barnes.

== Barnes of Missouri ==
- Jerome Barnes, Missouri State Representative 2017–2025
  - Donna Barnes Missouri State Representative 2025–present. Wife of Jerome Barnes.

== Barnums ==
- P. T. Barnum (1810–1891), Connecticut State Representative 1865–1866 1877–1879, candidate for U.S. Representative from Connecticut 1867, Mayor of Bridgeport, Connecticut 1875. Third cousin of William Henry Barnum. More notable for his career as impresario of the Barnum & Bailey Circus.
- William Henry Barnum (1818–1889), Connecticut State Representative 1851–1852, U.S. Representative from Connecticut 1867–1876, delegate to the Democratic National Convention 1876, U.S Senator from Connecticut 1876–1879, Chairman of the Democratic National Committee 1877–1889. Third cousin of P.T. Barnum.

== Barnwells ==
- Robert Barnwell (1761–1814), Delegate to the Continental Congress from South Carolina 1788–1789, delegate to the South Carolina Constitutional Convention 1788, U.S. Representative from South Carolina 1791–1793, South Carolina State Representative 1795–1797, South Carolina State Senator 1805–1806. Father of Robert Woodward Barnwell.
  - Robert Woodward Barnwell (1801–1882), South Carolina State Representative 1826–1828, U.S. Representative from South Carolina 1829–1833, U.S. Senator from South Carolina 1850, Confederate States Provisional Representative from South Carolina 1861–1862, Confederate States Senator from South Carolina 1862–1865. Son of Robert Barnwell.

== Barrases ==
- Elton Joseph Barras (1923–2007), assessor of Iberia Parish, Louisiana, 1984 to 2000, father of Taylor Barras
  - Taylor Barras (born 1957), Speaker of the Louisiana House of Representatives since January 11, 2016; member of the Louisiana House since 2008 from New Iberia, son of Elton Barras

== Barreres ==
- Nelson Barrere (1808–1883), Ohio State Representative 1837–1838, U.S. Representative from Ohio 1851–1853. Uncle of Granville Barrere.
  - Granville Barrere (1829–1889), member of the Canton, Illinois Board of Education; U.S. Representative from Illinois 1873–1875. Nephew of Nelson Barrere.

== Barretts ==
- Charles Barrett, Vermont State Representative. Father of John Barrett.
  - John Barrett (1866–1938), U.S. Minister to Siam 1894–1898, U.S. Consul General in Bangkok, Thailand 1894–1898; U.S. Minister to Argentina 1903–1904; U.S. Minister to Panama 1904–1905; U.S. Minister to Colombia 1905–1906. Son of Charles Barrett.

== Barretts of Wyoming ==
- Frank A. Barrett (1892–1962), Wyoming State Senator 1933–1935, U.S. Representative from Wyoming 1943–1950, Governor of Wyoming 1951–1953, U.S. Senator from Wyoming 1953–1959.
  - James E. Barrett (1922–2011), Attorney General of Wyoming 1967–1971, Judge of the United States Court of Appeals for the Tenth Circuit 1971–1987. Son of Frank A. Barrett.

== Barringers ==
- Daniel Laurens Barringer (1788–1852), member of the North Carolina House of Commons 1813–1814 1819–1822, U.S. Representative from North Carolina 1826–1835, Tennessee State Representative 1843–1845. Brother of Paul Barringer.
  - Daniel Moreau Barringer (1806–1873), member of the North Carolina House of Commons 1829–1834 1840 1842 1854, delegate to the North Carolina Constitutional Convention 1835, U.S. Representative from North Carolina 1843–1849, U.S. Minister to Spain 1849–1853, Chairman of the North Carolina Democratic Committee 1872. Nephew of Daniel Laurens Barringer.
  - Rufus Barringer (1821–1895), delegate to the North Carolina Constitutional Convention 1875, candidate for Lieutenant Governor of North Carolina 1880. Nephew of Daniel Laurens Barringer.
- Paul Barringer (1778–1844), member of the North Carolina Senate. Brother of Daniel Laurens Barringer.

== Barrows ==
- Alexander Barrow (1801–1846), Louisiana State Representative, U.S. Senator from Louisiana 1841–1846. Brother of Washington Barrow.
- Washington Barrow (1807–1866), U.S. Minister to Portugal 1841–1844, U.S. Representative from Tennessee 1847–1849, Tennessee State Senator 1860–1861. Brother of Alexander Barrow.

== Barrys and Blackburns ==
- William T. Barry (1784–1835), Kentucky State Representative 1807, U.S. Representative from Kentucky 1810–1811, U.S. Senator from Kentucky 1814–1816, Kentucky State Senator 1817–1821, Lieutenant Governor of Kentucky 1820–1824, Kentucky Secretary of States 1824–1825, candidate for Governor of Kentucky 1828, U.S. Postmaster General 1829–1835. Uncle of Luke P. Blackburn and Joseph Clay Stiles Blackburn.
  - Luke P. Blackburn (1816–1887), Governor of Kentucky 1879–1883. Nephew of William T. Barry.
  - Joseph Clay Stiles Blackburn (1838–1918), Kentucky State Representative 1871–1875, U.S. Representative from Kentucky 1875–1885, U.S. Senator from Kentucky 1895–1897 1891–1897. Nephew of William T. Barry.

NOTE: Luke P. Blackburn and Joseph Clay Stiles Blackburn were also distant cousins of U.S. Secretary of State Henry Clay.

== Barrys of Mississippi ==
- Bartlett C. Barry, Member of the Mississippi State Senate from Wayne, Covington, and Monroe Counties (1822–1826) Uncle/Uncle-in-law of:
  - William S. Barry (1821–1868), U. S. Representative from Mississippi 1853–1855, Speaker of the Mississippi House of Representatives 1856–1858, Member of the Mississippi House of Representatives from Lowndes and Oktibbeha Counties 1850–1859. Son of Major Richard Barry, the brother of B. C. Barry.
    - William Sullivan Barry (1857–1933), Member of the Mississippi House of Representatives from Leflore County 1888–1892 and 1912–1920. Son of William S. Barry.
  - Barry W. Benson (1811/2–1839), Secretary of State of Mississippi 1835–1839. Son-in-law of Major Richard Barry, the brother of B. C. Barry.

== Bartletts ==
- Roscoe Bartlett (born 1926), U.S. Representative from Maryland 1993–2013. Father of Joseph R. Bartlett.
  - Joseph R. Bartlett (born 1969), Maryland State Representative 1999–2011. Son of Roscoe Bartlett.

== Bartletts of New Hampshire ==
- Josiah Bartlett (1729–1795), New Hampshire Assemblyman 1765–1775, Justice of the Peace in New Hampshire, Delegate to the Continental Congress from New Hampshire 1775–1776 1778, Justice of the New Hampshire Supreme Court 1782–1788, Chief Justice of the New Hampshire Supreme Court 1788–1789, Governor of New Hampshire 1790–1794. Father of Josiah Bartlett Jr.
  - Josiah Bartlett Jr. (1768–1838), New Hampshire State Senator 1809–1810 1824, U.S. Representative from New Hampshire 1811–1813. Son of Josiah Bartlett.
    - Edward T. Bartlett (1841–1910), candidate for Justice of the New York 1891, Judge of the New York Court of Appeals 1894–1910. Great-grandson of Josiah Bartlett.
    - John D. O'Rear (1870–1918), U.S. Minister to Bolivia 1913–1918. Great-grandson of Josiah Bartlett.

NOTE: John D. O'Rear was also third cousin of Kentucky Court of Appeals Judge Edward Clay O'Rear.

== Bartletts of New York ==
- Willard Bartlett (1846–1925), Justice of the New York Supreme Court 1884–1906, Judge of the New York Court of Appeals 1906–13, Chief Judge of the New York Court of Appeals 1913–16. Brother of Franklin Bartlett.
- Franklin Bartlett (1847–1909), U.S. Representative from New York 1893–97, delegate to the Democratic National Convention 1896 1904. Brother of Willard Bartlett.

== Bartletts of Oklahoma ==
- Dewey F. Bartlett (1919–1979), Oklahoma State Senator 1962–66, Governor of Oklahoma 1967–71, U.S. Senator from Oklahoma 1973–79. Father of Dewey F. Bartlett Jr.
  - Dewey F. Bartlett Jr. (born 1947), Tulsa, Oklahoma Councilman 1990–94; candidate for Oklahoma State Senate 2004, elected Mayor of Tulsa 2009. Son of Dewey F. Bartlett.

== Bartleys ==
- Mordecai Bartley (1783–1870), Ohio State Senator 1816–18, U.S. Representative from Ohio 1823–31, Governor of Ohio 1844–46. Father of Thomas W. Bartley.
  - Thomas W. Bartley (1812–1885), Ohio State Representative 1829–31, Ohio State Senator 1841–45, Governor of Ohio 1844, Justice of the Ohio Supreme Court 1852–59. Son of Mordecai Bartley.

NOTE: Thomas W. Bartley was also the brother-in-law of Senator John Sherman and General William Tecumseh Sherman.

== Bartolomeos ==
- Craig Self (1940–2017), town chairman of Wallingford, Connecticut. Father of State Senator Danté Bartolomeo.
  - Danté Bartolomeo (born 1969), Former Meriden City Councilor, Connecticut State Senator for the 13th District. Daughter of Craig

== Bartons ==
- David Barton (1783–1837), Missouri State Representative, U.S. Senator from Missouri 1821–31. Brother of Joshua Barton.
- Joshua Barton (1792–1823), Missouri Secretary of State, U.S. District Attorney of Jefferson County, Missouri. Brother of David Barton.

== Bartons and Hamlins ==
- Courtney W. Hamlin (1858–1950), U.S. Representative from Missouri 1903–05 1907–19. Cousin of William Edward Barton.
- William Edward Barton (1868–1955), delegate to the Missouri Judicial Convention 1896 1906, Prosecuting Attorney of Texas County, Missouri 1901–02; Circuit Judge in Missouri 1923–28 1934–46; U.S. Representative from Missouri 1931–33. Cousin of Courtney W. Hamlin.

== Barwigs ==
- Charles Barwig (1837–1912), Mayor of Mayville, Wisconsin 1886–88; U.S. Representative from Wisconsin 1889–95. Father of Byron Barwig.
  - Byron Barwig (1862–1943), Mayor of Mayville, Wisconsin; delegate to the 1908 Democratic National Convention; Wisconsin State Senator. Son of Charles Barwig.

== Bashfords ==
- Coles Bashford (1816–1878), District Attorney of Wayne County, New York 1847–50; Wisconsin State Senator 1853–55; candidate for Governor of Wisconsin 1855; Governor of Wisconsin 1856–58; Attorney General of Arizona Territory 1864–66; U.S. Congressional Delegate from Arizona Territory 1867–69; Secretary of Arizona Territory 1869–76. Father of Levi Bashford.
  - Levi Bashford, delegate to the Republican National Convention 1880. Son of Coles Bashford.

== Bass ==
- Robert P. Bass (1873–1960), New Hampshire State Representative 1905 1909, New Hampshire State Senator 1910, Governor of New Hampshire 1911–13. Father of Perkins Bass and Robert P. Bass Jr.
  - Perkins Bass (1912–2011), New Hampshire State Representative 1939 1941 1947 1951, New Hampshire State Senator 1949–51, U.S. Representative from New Hampshire 1955–63, candidate for U.S. Senate from New Hampshire 1962, Selectman of Peterborough, New Hampshire 1972–76. Son of Robert P. Bass.
    - Charles Foster Bass (born 1952), candidate for the Republican nomination for U.S. Representative from New Hampshire 1980, member of the New Hampshire General Court 1982–88, delegate to the New Hampshire Constitutional Convention 1984, New Hampshire State Senator 1988–92, U.S. Representative from New Hampshire 1995–2007, 2011–2013. Son of Perkins Bass.
  - Robert P. Bass Jr. (1923-2011), Republican National Committeeman 1970–73, delegate to the Republican National Convention 1972. Son of Robert P. Bass.

== Batchelders ==
- William G. Batchelder (1942–2022), Ohio State Representative 1969–98 2007–14.
- Alice M. Batchelder (born 1944), Judge of the United States District Court for the Northern District of Ohio 1985–91, Judge of the United States Court of Appeals for the Sixth Circuit 1991–2019. Wife of William G. Batchelder.

== Batemans ==
- Herbert H. Bateman (1928–2000), Virginia State Senator 1968–83, candidate for the Republican nomination for Lieutenant Governor of Virginia 1981, U.S. Representative from Virginia 1983–2000. Father of Herbert H. Bateman Jr.
  - Herbert H. Bateman Jr., Newport News, Virginia Councilman. Son of Herbert H. Bateman.

== Bateses ==
Three brothers:

- Frederick Bates (1777–1825), Governor of Missouri
- Edward Bates (1793–1869), Attorney General of the United States
- James Woodson Bates (1788–1846), delegate to U.S. Congress

NOTE: Frederick Bates, Edward Bates and James Woodson Bates were also third cousins once removed of U.S. Representative Samuel H. Woodson (1777–1827), Missouri Governor Silas Woodson (1819–1896), Kansas Territory Governor Daniel Woodson (1824–1894) and Montana legislator John Archibald Woodson, and third cousin twice removed of Democratic National Committeeman Urey Woodson (1859–1939). James Woodson Bates was also stepfather of Arkansas State Representative Matthew C. Moore.

== Bates of Massachusetts ==
- George J. Bates (1891–1949), Massachusetts State Representative 1918–24, Mayor of Salem, Massachusetts 1924–37; U.S. Representative from Massachusetts 1937–49. Father of William H. Bates.
  - William H. Bates (1917–1969), U.S. Representative from Massachusetts 1950–69. Son of George J. Bates.

== Bates and Thayers ==
- John Thayer (1820–1906), Nebraska Territory Senator 1860, delegate to the Nebraska Territory Constitutional Convention 1860 1866, U.S. Senator from Nebraska 1867–71, Governor of Wyoming Territory 1875–78, Governor of Nebraska 1897–91. Uncle of Arthur Laban Bates.
  - Arthur Laban Bates (1859–1934), Solicitor of Meadville, Pennsylvania 1889–96; U.S. Representative from Pennsylvania 1901–13; delegate to the Republican National Convention 1924. Nephew of John Thayer.

== Battins ==
- James F. Battin (1925–1996), U.S. Representative from Montana 1961–69, Judge of the United States District Court for the District of Montana 1969–90.
  - Jim Battin (born 1962), California State Assemblyman 1994–2000, California State Senator 2000–08. Son of James F. Battin.

== Battles ==
- John S. Battle (1890–1972), Virginia House Delegate 1929, Virginia State Senator 1934–50, Governor of Virginia 1950–54, delegate to the Democratic National Convention 1952, candidate for Democratic nomination for President of the United States 1956. Father of William Cullen Battle.
  - William Cullen Battle, U.S. Ambassador to Australia 1962–64. Son of John S. Battle.

== Battons ==
- J. D. Batton (1911–1981), sheriff of Webster Parish, Louisiana, from 1952 to 1964, brother of Jack Batton
- Jack Batton (1913–1996), city councillor of Minden, Louisiana, mayor of Minden, Louisiana, 1978–82, brother of J. D. Batton

== Baxters ==
- James P. Baxter (1831–1921), Mayor of Portland, Maine 1893–96 1904–05. Father of Percival Proctor Baxter.
  - Percival Proctor Baxter (1876–1969), Maine State Representative 1905–06 1917–20, Maine State Senator 1909–10, delegate to the Republican National Convention 1920 1924 1928, Governor of Maine 1921–25. Son of James P. Baxter.

== Baxters of North Carolina and Wyoming ==
- John Baxter (1819–1886), member of the North Carolina General Assembly 1842–43 1846–48 1852–57, Judge of the U.S. Court of Appeals 1877–86. Father of George W. Baxter.
  - George W. Baxter (1855–1929), Governor of Wyoming Territory 1886, delegate to the Wyoming Constitutional Convention 1889, candidate for Governor of Wyoming 1890, candidate for U.S. Senate from Wyoming 1893. Son of John Baxter.
- Elisha Baxter (1827–1899), Governor of Arkansas 1873–74. Brother of John Baxter.

== Bayhs ==
- Birch E. Bayh II (1928–2019), U.S. senator from Indiana, 1963–81, and 1976 presidential candidate. Father of Evan Bayh.
  - B. Evans "Evan" Bayh III (born 1955), Secretary of State, Indiana, 1986–89, Governor, Indiana, 1989–97, U.S. Senator from Indiana, 1999–2011. Son of Birch Bayh.
    - B. Evans "Beau" Bayh IV (born 1995), 2026 candidate for Secretary of State of Indiana. Son of Evan Bayh.

== Baylieses ==
- William Baylies (1776–1865), Massachusetts State Representative 1808–09 1812–13 1820–21, Massachusetts State Senator 1825–26 1830–31, U.S. Representative from Massachusetts 1813–17 1833–35. Brother of Francis Baylies.
- Francis Baylies (1783–1852), candidate f8, U.S. Representative from Massachusetts 1821–27, Massachusetts State Representative 1827–32 1835, U.S. Chargé d'Affaires to Argentina 1832. Brother of William Baylies.

== Baylys ==
- Thomas M. Bayly (1775–1829), Virginia House Delegate 1804–14, U.S. Representative from Virginia 1817–23. Father of Thomas H. Bayly.
  - Thomas H. Bayly (1810–1856), Virginia House Delegate 1836–42, Judge of the Superior Court of Law and Chancery of Virginia 1842–44, U.S. Representative from Virginia 1844–56. Son of Thomas M. Bayly.

== Beakes ==
- George M. Beakes (1831–1900), New York Assemblyman 1891–92. Father of Samuel W. Beakes.
- Hiram J. Beakes, Michigan State Representative 1863–64, Washtenaw County, Michigan Probate Court Judge 1864–72; Mayor of Ann Arbor, Michigan 1873–75. Father-in-law of Samuel W. Meakes.
  - Samuel W. Beakes (1861–1927), Mayor of Ann Arbor, Michigan 1888–90; Postmaster of Ann Arbor, Michigan 1894–98; Treasurer of Ann Arbor, Michigan 1891–93 1903–05; U.S. Representative from Michigan 1913–17 1917–19; delegate to the Democratic National Convention 1916. Son of George M. Beakes.

== Beales, Blaines, and Ewings ==
- John Hoge Ewing (1796–1887), Pennsylvania State Representative 1835–36, Pennsylvania State Senator 1838–42, U.S. Representative from Pennsylvania 1845–47. Uncle by marriage of James G. Blaine.
  - James G. Blaine (1830–1893), delegate to the Republican National Convention 1856, Maine State Representative 1859–62, U.S. Representative from Maine 1863–76, Speaker of the U.S. House of Representative 1869–75, candidate for the Republican nomination for President of the United States 1876 1880, U.S. Senator from Maine 1876–81, U.S. Secretary of States 1881 1889–92, candidate for President of the United States 1884. Nephew by marriage of John Hoge Ewing.
    - Truxtun Beale (1856–1936), U.S. Minister to Persia 1891–92, U.S. Minister to Greece 1892–93, delegate to the Republican National Convention 1912. Son-in-law of James G. Blaine.

NOTE: Truxtun Beale was also son of U.S. Minister Edward Fitzgerald Beale.

== Bealls ==
- James Glenn Beall (1894–1971), Maryland State Senator 1930–34, delegate to the Republican National Convention 1936 1940 1956 1960, U.S. Representative from Maryland 1943–53, U.S. Senator from Maryland 1953–65. Father of John Glenn Beall Jr. and George Beall.
  - John Glenn Beall Jr. (1927–2006), Maryland House Delegate 1962–68, U.S. Representative from Maryland 1969–71, U.S. Senator from Maryland 1971–77, candidate for Governor of Maryland 1978. Son of James Glenn Beall.
  - George Beall (born 1937), delegate to the Republican National Convention 1968, U.S. Attorney of Maryland 1970–75. Son of James Glenn Beall.

== Beaupres and Marshes ==
- C.W. Marsh, delegate to the Republican National Convention 1880. Father-in-law of Arthur M. Beaupre.
  - Arthur M. Beaupre (1853–1919), Clerk of Kane County, Illinois 1886–94; U.S. Consul General in Bogotá, Colombia 1902; U.S. Minister to Colombia 1903; U.S. Minister to Argentina 1904–08; U.S. Minister to the Netherlands 1908–11; U.S. Minister to Luxembourg 1908–11; U.S. Minister to Cuba 1911–13. Son-in-law of C.W. Marsh.

== Beauregards, Slidells, and Villeres ==
- John Slidell (1793–1871), candidate for U.S. Representative from Louisiana 1828, District Attorney in New Orleans, Louisiana 1829–33; Louisiana State Representative; U.S. Representative from Louisiana 1843–45; U.S. Minister to Mexico 1845–46; U.S. Senator from Louisiana 1853–61. Brother-in-law of P.G.T. Beauregard.
- P.G.T. Beauregard (1818–1893), Commissioner of Public Works of New Orleans, Louisiana. Brother-in-law of John Slidell.
  - Jacques Villere (1761–1830), Justice of the Peace in Louisiana, candidate for Governor of Louisiana 1812, Governor of Louisiana 1816–20. Step-grandson of P.G.T. Beauregard.

== Beckers ==
- Maximilian F. Becker, Leader of Lynbrook Democratic Club in the 1910s. Father of Frank J. Becker.
  - Frank J. Becker (1899–1981), New York State Assemblyman 1945–52, Congressman from New York's 3rd and 5th Districts 1953–65, delegate to the 1952, 1956, 1960 and 1964 Republican National Convention. Father of Francis X. Becker Sr and Robert G. Becker. Son of Maximillian F. Becker.
    - Francis X. Becker Sr (1926–2016), Lynbrook, New York Mayor 1968–81, State Supreme Court Justice 1950s–1980s. Son of Frank J. Becker.
      - Gregory R. Becker (born 1954), New York State Assemblyman 1983–97, Candidate for Congress in 1998, Executive Leader of Lynbrook Republican Club. Son of Francis X. Becker Sr, brother of Francis X. Becker Jr. and Hilary Becker.
      - Francis X. Becker Jr. (born 1952), Nassau County, New York Legislator 1995–2015, Candidate for Congress in 2010, 2012, Executive Leader of Lynbrook Republican Club. Son of Francis X. Becker Sr, brother of Gregory and Hilary Becker.
      - Hilary Becker, Lynbrook, New York Village Trustee 2009–Present. Brother of Francis X. Becker Jr. and Gregory Becker.
    - Robert G. Becker, Executive Leader of Lynbrook, New York Republican Club. Brother of Francis X. Becker Sr.

== Bedfords and Reads ==
- George Ross (1730–1779), Pennsylvania Colony Assemblyman 1768–76, delegate to the Pennsylvania Colony Constitutional Convention 1774, Delegate to the Continental Congress from Pennsylvania 1774–77, Judge in Pennsylvania 1779. Brother-in-law of George Read.
- George Read (1733–1798), Delegate to the Continental Congress from Delaware 1774–77, Delaware Assemblyman 1776–88, President of Delaware 1777–78, delegate to the Philadelphia Convention, U.S. Senator from Delaware 1789–95, Chief Justice of the Delaware Supreme Court 1793–98. Brother-in-law of George Ross.
  - George Read Jr. (1765–1836), U.S. Attorney of Delaware 1789–1836. Son of George Read.
  - John Read (1760–1854), Pennsylvania State Senator 1816–17. Son of George Read.
    - John Meredith Read (1797–1874), Pennsylvania State Representative 1823–25, U.S. Attorney in Pennsylvania 1837–41, Attorney General of Pennsylvania 1846, Justice of the Pennsylvania Supreme Court 1858–72, Chief Justice of the Pennsylvania Supreme Court 1872–73. Son of John Read.
      - John Meredith Read Jr. (1837–1896), U.S. Minister to Greece 1873–77, U.S. Chargé d'Affaires to Greece 1877–79. Son of John Meredith Read.
  - Gunning Bedford Sr. (1742–1797), Delaware Assemblyman 1783–87, Governor of Delaware 1796–97. Son-in-law of George Read.
  - Gunning Bedford Jr. (1747–1812), Delegate to the Continental Congress from Delaware 1783–84 1784–86, Judge of the United States District Court for the District of Delaware 1789–1812. Cousin of Gunning Bedford Sr.

NOTE: John Read was also son-in-law of Continental Congressional Delegate Samuel Meredith.

== Bedingers ==
- George M. Bedinger (1756–1843), Kentucky State Representative 1792, Kentucky State Senator 1800–01, U.S. Representative from Kentucky 1803–07. Uncle of Henry Bedinger.
  - Henry Bedinger (1812–1858), U.S. Representative from Virginia 1845–49, U.S. Minister to Denmark 1853–58. Nephew of George M. Bedinger.

== Bees ==
- Thomas Bee (1739–1812), South Carolina State Representative 1778–79 1786–88, Lieutenant Governor of South Carolina 1779–80, Delegate to the Continental Congress from South Carolina 1780–81, South Carolina State Senator 1788–90, Judge of U.S. District Court of South Carolina 1790–1812. Grandfather of Hamilton Prioleau Bee.
  - Barnard E. Bee Sr. (1787-1853), Republic of Texas Secretary of the Treasury 1836, Republic of Texas Secretary of War 1837-38, Republic of Texas Minister to the United States, 1838-39. Son of Thomas Bee.
    - Hamilton Prioleau Bee (1822–1897), Texas State Representative 1849–59. Son of Barnard E. Bee.
      - Carlos Bee (1867–1932), delegate to the Democratic National Convention 1904 1908, Texas State Senator 1915–19, U.S. Representative from Texas 1919–21. Son of Hamilton Prioleau Bee.

NOTE: Hamilton Prioleau Bee was also nephew of U.S. Representative James Hamilton Jr.

== Begiches ==
- Joseph Begich (1930–2019), Mayor of Eveleth, Minnesota 1965–74, Minnesota House of Representatives 1975–92, Member Iron Range Resources and Rehabilitation Board 1977–92 (Legislative) and 1999–2013 (Citizen). Brother of Nick Begich Sr.
- Nick Begich Sr. (1932–1972), Alaska State Senate 1962–70, U.S. House of Representatives 1970–72. Brother of Joseph Begich.
- Margaret "Pegge" Begich (born 1938), Democratic National Committeewoman 1984, candidate for U.S. Representative from Alaska 1984, 1986. Wife of Nick Begich Sr.
  - Nick Begich Jr. (born 1958), candidate for Governor of Alaska 1998, candidate for Alaska state representative 2004. Son of Nick Begich and Margaret Begich and father of Nicholas Begich III.
    - Nick Begich III (born 1977), U.S. House of Representatives 2025–present. Republican candidate for the Chugiak-Eagle River seat on the Anchorage Assembly in 2016, for the 2022 United States House of Representatives election in Alaska, and for the 2024 United States House of Representatives election in Alaska. Son of Nicholas J. Begich Jr.
  - Thomas Begich (born 1960), Alaska state senator 2017–23, Alaska Senate Minority leader 2019-23, candidate for Governor of Alaska 2026, delegate to the Democratic National Convention 2004. Son of Nick Begich Sr. and Margaret Begich.
  - Mark Begich (born 1962), Anchorage Assembly 1988–98, Mayor of Anchorage 2003–09, U.S. Senator 2009–15. Son of Nick Begich Sr.
  - Deborah Bonito, Chairwoman of the Alaska Democratic Party in 1980. Wife of Mark Begich.

== Behms, Orths, and Rahms ==
- C. Henry Orth (1773–1816), Pennsylvania state senator 1801–04. Uncle of Godlove S. Orth.
  - Godlove Stein Orth (1817–1882), Indiana state senator 1843–48, U.S. Representative from Indiana 1863–71 1873–75 1879–82, U.S. Minister to Austria-Hungary 1875–76. Nephew of C. Henry Orth.
    - Godlove Orth Behm (1828–1888), Indiana state representative 1851–52. Nephew of Godlove S. Orth.
- Melchior Rahm (1762–1820) Pennsylvania state senator 1805–1814. Brother-in-law of C. Henry Orth.

NOTE: C. Henry Orth was also father-in-law of U.S. Representative Luther Reily.

== Belfords ==
- James B. Belford (1837–1910), Indiana State Representative 1867, Justice of the Colorado Supreme Court, U.S. Representative from Colorado 1876–1877 1879–85. Cousin of Joseph M. Belford.
- Joseph M. Belford (1852–1917), Chairman of the Suffolk County, New York Republican Committee; Clerk of the Suffolk County, New York Surrogate Court; U.S. Representative from New York 1897–99; delegate to the Republican National Convention 1900; Surrogate of Suffolk County, New York 1904–10. Cousin of James B. Belford.

== Belknaps ==
- William W. Belknap (1829–1890), Iowa State Representative 1857–58, U.S. Secretary of War 1869–76. Father of Hugh R. Belknap.
  - Hugh R. Belknap (1860–1901), U.S. Representative from Illinois 1895–99. Son of William W. Belknap.
- William Burke Belknap (1835–1965), member of Kentucky state house of representatives 59th District, 1924–28, 1934–35; candidate for U.S. Representative from Kentucky, 1933.
- Morris Burke Belknap (1856–1910), Republican nominee for Governor of Kentucky in 1903.

== Bells ==
- John Bell (1765–1836), Governor of New Hampshire 1828–29. Brother of Samuel Bell.
  - Charles H. Bell (1823–1893), New Hampshire State Representative 1858–60, New Hampshire State Senator 1863–64, U.S. Senator from New Hampshire 1879, Governor of New Hampshire 1881–83, President of the New Hampshire Constitutional Convention 1889. Son of John Bell.
- Samuel Bell (1770–1850), New Hampshire State Representative 1804–07, New Hampshire State Senator, New Hampshire Executive Councilman 1809–11, Justice of the New Hampshire Supreme Court 1816–19, Governor of New Hampshire 1819–23, U.S. Senator from New Hampshire 1823–35. Brother of John Bell.
  - James Bell (1805–1857), New Hampshire State Representative 1846–50, candidate for Governor of New Hampshire 1854 1855, U.S. Senator from New Hampshire 1855–57. Son of Samuel Bell.
    - Samuel Newell Bell (1829–1889), U.S. Representative from New Hampshire 1871–73 1875–77. Grandson of Samuel Bell.

== Bells/Myers of Pennsylvania ==
- Leonard Myers (1827–1905), Pennsylvania representative in the U.S. House 1863–69 1869–75. Daughter Fleurette de Benneville married John C. Bell.
  - John C. Bell (1861–1935), delegate to the Republican National Convention 1904, Pennsylvania Attorney General 1911–15. Father of John C. Bell Jr.
    - John C. Bell Jr. (1892–1974), Lieutenant Governor of Pennsylvania 1943–47, Governor of Pennsylvania 1947, Justice of the Pennsylvania Supreme Court 1950–61, Chief Justice of the Pennsylvania Supreme Court 1961–72. Son of John C. Bell, grandson of Leonard Myers.

== Bells and Brabsons ==
- Reese Bowen Brabson (1817–1863), Tennessee State Representative 1851–52, U.S. Representative from Tennessee 1859–61. Uncle of Charles K. Bell.
  - Charles K. Bell (1853–1913), Prosecuting Attorney of Hamilton County, Texas 1876; District Attorney of Hamilton County, Texas 1880–82; delegate to the Democratic National Convention 1884; Texas State Senator 1884–88; District Court Judge in Texas 1888–90; U.S. Representative from Texas 1893–97; Attorney General of Texas 1901–04. Nephew of Reese Bowen Brabson.

== Bells and Keebles ==
- John Bell (1797–1869), Tennessee State Senator 1817, U.S. Representative from Tennessee 1827–41, Speaker of the U.S. House of Representatives 1834–35, U.S. Secretary of War 1841, Tennessee State Representative 1847, U.S. Senator from Tennessee 1847–59, candidate for President of the United States 1860. Father-in-law of Edwin Augustus Keeble.
  - Edwin Augustus Keeble (1807–1868), Mayor of Murfreesboro, Tennessee 1838–55; member of the Tennessee Legislature 1861; Confederate States Representative from Tennessee 1864–65. Son-in-law of John Bell.

== Belmonts ==
See also The Perry Family

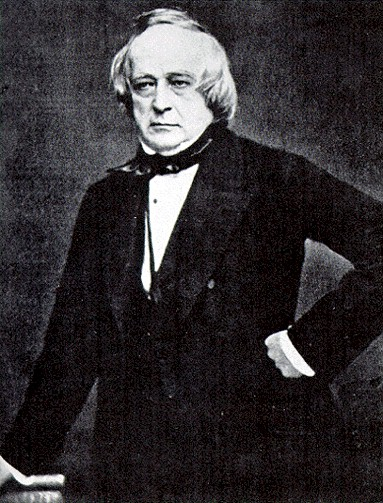
John Slidell

- John Slidell (1793–1871), Louisiana State Representative, candidate for U.S. Representative from Louisiana 1828, U.S. District Attorney in Louisiana 1829–33, candidate for U.S. Senate from Louisiana 1834 1836 1848, U.S. Representative from Louisiana 1843–45, U.S. Senator from Louisiana 1853–61, Justice of the Louisiana Supreme Court. Uncle-in-law of August Belmont.
  - August Belmont (1813–1890), U.S. Minister to the Netherlands 1853–57, delegate to the Democratic National Convention 1860, Chairman of the Democratic National Committee. Nephew-in-law of John Slidell.
    - Perry Belmont (1851–1947), U.S. Representative from New York 1881–89, U.S. Ambassador to Spain 1889. Son of August Belmont.
    - Oliver Belmont (1858–1908), delegate to the Democratic National Convention 1900, U.S. Representative from New York 1901–03. Son of August Belmont.

NOTE: John Slidells's brother-in-law, Matthew C. Perry, was also brother-in-law of George Washington Rodgers, Rodgers' brother, John Rodgers, was father-in-law of Montgomery C. Meigs, who was grandnephew of U.S. Postmaster General Return J. Meigs Jr. Slidell was also grandfather-in-law of U.S. diplomat Joseph Grew and great-grandfather-in-law of U.S. diplomat Jay Pierrepont Moffat. August Butler was also first cousin by marriage of U.S. Senator Matthew C. Butler.

== Benjamins and Hyams ==
- Henry M. Hyams (1806–1875), Lieutenant Governor of Louisiana 1859. Cousin of Judah P. Benjamin.
- Judah P. Benjamin (1811–1884), Louisiana State Representative 1842–44, delegate to the Louisiana Constitutional Convention 1845, U.S. Senator from Louisiana 1853–61, Attorney General of the Confederate States 1861, Confederate States Secretary of War 1861–62, Confederate States Secretary of State 1862–65. Cousin of Henry M. Hyams.

== Bennets ==
- William S. Bennet (1870–1962), New York Assemblyman 1901–02, Justice of the New York City Municipal Court 1903, U.S. Representative from New York 1905–11 1915–17, delegate to the Republican National Convention 1808 1916, candidate for U.S. Representative from New York 1936 1944, delegate to the New York Constitutional Convention 1938. Father of Augustus W. Bennet.
  - Augustus W. Bennet (1897–1983), U.S. Representative from New York 1945–47. Son of William S. Bennet.

== Bennetts ==
- Wallace Foster Bennett (1898–1993), U.S. Senator from Utah 1951–74. Father of Robert Foster Bennett.
  - Robert Foster Bennett (1933–2016), U.S. Senator from Utah 1993–2011. Son of Wallace F. Bennett.
    - Jim Bennett, candidate for U.S. Representative from Utah. Son of Robert Foster Bennett.

== Bennetts and Memmingers ==
- Thomas Bennett Jr. (1781–1865), Governor of South Carolina 1820–22. Adoptive father of Christopher G. Memminger.
  - Christopher G. Memminger (1803–1888), member of the South Carolina Legislature 1836–52 1854–60 1876–79, Delegate to the Confederate States Provisional Congress from South Carolina 1861–62, Confederate States Secretary of the Treasury 1861–64. Adoptive son of Thomas Bennett Jr.
    - Lucien Memminger, U.S. Vice Consul in Boma, Belgian Congo 1907–08; U.S. Vice Consul in Naples, Italy 1908–10; U.S. Vice Consul in Beirut, Lebanon 1910–11; U.S. Vice Consul in Smyrna, Anatolia 1911; U.S. Consul in Rouen, France 1914; U.S. Consul in Madras, India 1916–19; U.S. Consul in Leghorn, Italy 1920–21; U.S. Consul in Bordeaux, France 1924–29; U.S. Consul General in Belfast, Northern Ireland 1932; U.S. Consul General in Paramaribo, Suriname 1943. Grandson of Christopher G. Memminger.
      - Robert B. Memminger (1904–1981), U.S. Vice Consul in Zagreb, Croatia 1938; U.S. Vice Consul in Montevideo, Uruguay 1943; U.S. Consul in Basra, Iraq 1944; U.S. Consul in Baghdad, Iraq 1944. Nephew of Lucien Memminger.
- William Johnson (1771–1834) Speaker of the South Carolina House of Representatives 1798–1800, Associate Justice of the Supreme Court of the United States 1804–34. Brother-in-law of Thomas Bennett Jr.

== Bennetts of Missouri ==
- Philip Allen Bennett (1881–1942), Chairman of the Dallas County, Missouri Republican Committee; delegate to the Republican National Convention 1912; Missouri State Senator 1921–25; Lieutenant Governor of Missouri 1925–29; candidate for Governor of Missouri 1928; candidate for U.S. Representative from Missouri 1938; U.S. Representative from Missouri 1941–42. Father of Marion T. Bennett.
  - Marion T. Bennett (1914–2000), U.S. Representative from Missouri 1943–49, Judge of U.S. Court of Claims 1972–82, Circuit Judge of U.S. Court of Appeals 1982–97. Son of Philip Allen Bennett.

== Bensons ==
- Henry L. Benson (1854–1921), District Attorney in Oregon 1892–96, Oregon State Representative 1897, Circuit Court Judge in Oregon 1898–1914, Justice of the Oregon Supreme Court 1915–21. Brother of Frank W. Benson.
- Frank W. Benson (1858–1911), Oregon Secretary of State 1907–11, Governor of Oregon 1909–10. Brother of Henry L. Benson.

== Bensons of New York ==
- Egbert Benson (1746–1833), Attorney General of New York 1777–89, Chief Judge of the United States Circuit Court for the Second Circuit 1801–02, U.S. Representative from New York 1789–93 1813.
  - Egbert Benson (1789–1866) Member of the Board of Aldermen of New York City 1835–41 1845–46. Nephew of Egbert Benson.

== Bentleys ==
- Alvin Morell Bentley (1918–1969), U.S. Representative from Michigan 1953–61, candidate for U.S. Senate from Michigan 1960, delegate to the Michigan Constitutional Convention 1961 1962, candidate for U.S. Representative from Michigan 1962. Father of Alvin M. Bentley Jr.
  - Alvin M. Bentley Jr. (born 1941), Chairman of the Shiawassee County, Michigan Republican Party 1968–73. Son of Alvin Morell Bentley.

== Bentons ==
- Nathaniel S. Benton (1792–1869), New York State Senator 1828–31, U.S. Attorney in New York 1831, New York Secretary of States 1845–47. Brother of Charles S. Benton.
- Charles S. Benton (1810–1882), U.S. Representative from New York 1843–47, candidate for U.S. Representative from Wisconsin 1862, Judge of La Crosse County, Wisconsin 1874–81. Brother of Nathaniel S. Benton.

== Bentons, Browns, Clays, Fremonts, and McDowells ==
The Benton-Brown-Fremont-Clay-McDowell family is a family of politicians from the United States. Below is a list of members:

- John Brown (1757–1837), Virginia State Senator 1783–88, Delegate to the Continental Congress from Virginia 1787–88, U.S. Representative from Virginia 1789–92, U.S. Senator from Kentucky 1792–1805. Brother of James Brown.
- John Breckinridge (1760–1806), candidate for U.S. Senate from Kentucky 1794, Attorney General of Kentucky 1795–97, Kentucky State Representative 1798–1800, U.S. Senator from Kentucky 1801–05. Cousin of John Brown and James Brown.
- James Breckinridge (1763–1833), Virginia House Delegate 1789–1802 1806–08 1819–21 1823–24, U.S. Representative from Virginia 1809–17. Cousin of John Brown and James Brown.
- Francis Preston (1765–1836), Virginia House Delegate 1788–89 1812–14, U.S. Representative from Virginia 1793–97, Virginia State Senator 1816–20. Cousin of John Brown and James Brown.
- James Brown (1766–1835), Secretary of the Louisiana Territory, U.S. District Attorney of Louisiana Territory, U.S. Senator from Louisiana 1813–17 1819–23, U.S. Minister to France 1823–29. Brother of John Brown.
- Henry Clay (1777–1852), U.S. Senator from Kentucky 1806–07 1810–11 1831–42 1849–52, U.S. Representative from Kentucky 1811–14 1815–21 1823–25, Speaker of the U.S. House of Representative 1811–13 1813–14 1815–17 1817–19 1819–20 1823–25, candidate for President of the United States 1824 1832 1844, U.S. Secretary of State 1825–29. Brother-in-law of James Brown.
- Thomas Hart Benton (1782–1858), U.S. Senator from Missouri 1821–51, U.S. Representative from Missouri 1853–55. Cousin-in-law of James Brown and Henry Clay.
- James McDowell (1795–1851), Virginia House Delegate 1831–35 1838, Governor of Virginia 1843–46, U.S. Representative from Virginia 1846–51. Brother-in-law of Thomas Hart Benton.
- Cassius Marcellus Clay (1810–1903), U.S. Ambassador to Russia 1861–62 1863–69. Second cousin of Henry Clay.
  - Henry Clay Jr. (1811–1847), Kentucky State Representative 1835–37. Son of Henry Clay.
  - John C. Fremont (1813–1890), Governor of California 1847, U.S. Senator from California 1850–51, candidate for President of the United States 1856, Governor of Arizona Territory 18178–1881. Son-in-law of Thomas Hart Benton.
  - James Brown Clay (1817–1864), U.S. Chargé d'Affaires to Portugal 1849–50, U.S. Representative from Kentucky 1857–59. Son of Henry Clay.
  - Charles Donald Jacob (1838–1898), Mayor of Louisville, Kentucky 1873–78 1882–84 1888–90; U.S. Minister to Colombia 1886. Brother-in-law of James Brown Clay.

== Bentons and Dargans ==
- Lemuel Benton (1754–1818), South Carolina State Representative 1782–88, Justice of Darlington County, South Carolina Court 1785 1791; delegate to the South Carolina Constitutional Convention 1788 1790; Sheriff of Cheraw District, South Carolina 1789 1791; U.S. Representative from South Carolina 1793–99. Great-grandfather of George W. Dargan.
  - George W. Dargan (1841–1898), South Carolina State Representative 1877, Circuit Court Solicitor in South Carolina 1880, U.S. Representative from South Carolina 1883–91. Great-grandson of Lemuel Benton.

== Bentsens ==
- Lloyd Bentsen (1921–2006), Hidalgo County, Texas Judge 1946–49; U.S. Representative from Texas 1949–55; U.S. Senator from Texas 1971–93; candidate for the Democratic nomination for President of the United States 1976; candidate for Vice President of the United States 1988; U.S. Secretary of the Treasury 1993–94. Husband of B.A. Bentsen.
- B.A. Bentsen (1922–2020), Democratic National Committeewoman. Wife of Lloyd Bentsen.
  - Ken Bentsen Jr. (born 1959), U.S. Representative from Texas 1995–2003, candidate for the Democratic nomination for the U.S. Senate 2002. Nephew of Lloyd Bentsen.

== Bergens ==
- John Teunis Bergen (1786–1855), Sheriff of Kings County, New York 1821–25 1828–31; U.S. Representative from New York 1831–33. Second cousin of Teunis G. Bergen.
- Teunis G. Bergen (1806–1881), delegate to the New York Constitutional Convention 1846 1867 1868, delegate to the Democratic National Convention 1860, U.S. Representative from New York 1865–67. Second cousin of John Teunis Bergen.

== Berrys ==
- Campbell P. Berry (1834–1901), California Assemblyman 1869–73 1875–80, U.S. Representative from California 1879–83. Cousin of James Henderson Berry.
- James Henderson Berry (1841–1913), Arkansas State Representative 1866 1872–74, Arkansas State Court Judge 1878, Governor of Arkansas 1883–85, U.S. Senator from Arkansas 1885–1907. Cousin of Campbell P. Berry.

== Berrys and Johnsons ==
- John Berry (1833–1879), U.S. Representative from Ohio 1873–75. Father-in-law of Henry V. Johnson.
- George W. Johnson (1811-1862), Kentucky House of Representatives 1838-1830; Confederate Governor of Kentucky 1861-1862. Father of Henry V. Johnson.
  - Henry V. Johnson, Attorney of Scott County, Kentucky; U.S. Attorney of Colorado 1893–97; Mayor of Denver, Colorado 1899–1901. Son of George W. Johnson.

== Beshears ==
- Steve Beshear (born 1944) Member of the Kentucky House of Representatives 1974–80; Attorney General of Kentucky 1979–83, Lieutenant Governor of Kentucky 1983–87; Governor of Kentucky 2007–15. Father of Andy Beshear.
  - Andy Beshear (born 1977) Attorney General of Kentucky 2016–2019, Governor of Kentucky 2019–. Son of Steve Beshear.

== Bevills ==
- Tom Bevill (1921–2005), Alabama State Representative 1958–66, U.S. Representative from Alabama 1967–97, delegate to the Democratic National Convention 1996. Father of Don Bevill.
  - Don Bevill, candidate for U.S. Representative from Alabama 1998. Son of Tom Bevill.

== Bibbs and Graves ==
- William Wyatt Bibb (1781–1820), Georgia State Representative 1803–05, U.S. Representative from Georgia 1807–13, U.S. Senator from Georgia 1813–16, Governor of Alabama Territory 1817–19, Governor of Alabama 1819–20. Brother of Thomas Bibb.
- Thomas Bibb (1783–1839), delegate to the Alabama Constitutional Convention 1819, Governor of Alabama 1820–21. Brother of William Wyatt Bibb.
  - Bibb Graves (1873–1942), member of Alabama Legislature, Montgomery, Alabama City Attorney; candidate for Governor of Alabama 1922; Governor of Alabama 1927–31 1935–39. Cousin of William Wyatt Bibb and Thomas Bibb.
  - Dixie Bibb Graves (1882–1965), U.S. Senator from Alabama 1937–38. Wife of Bibb Graves.

== Bibbs and Scotts ==
- Charles Scott (1739–1813), member of the Virginia Legislature 1789, Governor of Kentucky 1808–12. Father-in-law of George M. Bibb.
  - George M. Bibb (1776–1859), Kentucky State Representative 1806 1817, U.S. District Attorney of Kentucky 1807–08 1819–24, Judge of the Kentucky Court of Appeals 1808–10 1828, U.S. Senator from Kentucky 1811–14 1829–35, U.S. Secretary of the Treasury 1844–45. Son-in-law of Charles Scott.

== Bidens and Blewitts ==
- Edward F. Blewitt (1859–1926), Pennsylvania State Senator. Great-grandfather of Joseph R. Biden Jr..
  - Joseph R. Biden Jr. (born 1942), New Castle County, Delaware Councilman 1970–72; U.S. Senator Delaware 1973–2009; candidate for Democratic nomination for President 1988, 2008, and 2020; Vice President of the United States 2009–2017; President of the United States 2021–2025; Great-grandson of Edward F. Blewitt.
    - Joseph R. Biden III (1969–2015), Attorney General of Delaware 2007–15. Son of Joseph R. Biden Jr.
    - Hunter Biden (born 1970), member of the Amtrak board and Vice Chairman of the board 2006–9. Son of Joseph R. Biden Jr

== Biggs ==
- Benjamin T. Biggs (1821–1893), delegate to the Delaware Constitutional Convention 1852, U.S. Representative from Delaware 1867–73, Governor of Delaware 1887–91. Father of John Biggs.
  - John Biggs, Attorney General of Delaware 1887–92. Son of Benjamin T. Biggs.
    - John Biggs Jr. (1895–1979), Judge of the United States Court of Appeals for the Third Circuit 1937–65. Son of John Biggs.

== Biglers ==
- John Bigler (1805–1871), California Assemblyman 1850–52, Governor of California 1852–56, U.S. Minister to Chile 1857–61. Brother of William Bigler.
- William Bigler (1814–1880), Pennsylvania State Senator 1841–47, Governor of Pennsylvania 1852–55, U.S. Senator from Pennsylvania 1856–61, delegate to the Democratic National Convention 1860 1864 1868, delegate to the Pennsylvania Constitutional Convention 1872. Brother of John Bigler.

== Bilbrays ==
- James Bilbray (1938–2021), Nevada State Senator 1981–87, U.S. Representative from Nevada 1987–95. Cousin of Brian Bilbray.
  - Erin Bilbray, candidate for the U.S. House of Representatives 2014. Daughter of James Bilbray.
  - Shannon Bilbray-Axelrod (born 1973), member of the Nevada Assembly 2016–present. Daughter of James Bilbray.
- Brian Bilbray (born 1951), Imperial Beach, California Councilman 1976–78; Mayor of Imperial Beach, California 1978–85; member of San Diego County, California Board of Supervisors 1985–95; U.S. Representative from California 1995–2001 and 2006–2013. Cousin of James Bilbray.
  - Brian Patrick Bilbray (born 1985), member of the Imperial Beach City Council 2010 – 2016. Son of Brian Bilbray.
  - Briana Baleskie (Bilbray) (born 1986), member of the San Diego Republican Central Committee 2008–2012. Political Compliance Specialist. CPA. Daughter of Brian Bilbray.

== Billings ==
- Franklin S. Billings (1862–1935), Vermont State Representative 1910–13 1921–23, Lieutenant Governor of Vermont 1923–25, Governor of Vermont 1925–27.
  - Franklin S. Billings Jr. (1922–2014), Member of the Vermont House of Representatives 1961–65, Judge of the United States District Court for the District of Vermont 1984–94. Son of Franklin S. Billings.

== Bilirakis ==
- Michael Bilirakis (born 1930), U.S. Representative from Florida 1983–2007. Father of Gus Bilirakis.
  - Gus Bilirakis (born 1963), Florida State Representative 1998–2006, U.S. Representative from Florida 2007–present. Son of Michael Bilirakis.

== Binghams ==
- Hiram Bingham III (1875–1956), Lieutenant Governor of Connecticut 1922–24, U.S. Senator from Connecticut 1924–33, Governor of Connecticut 1925. Father of Hiram Bingham IV and Jonathan Brewster Bingham.
  - Hiram Bingham IV (1903–1988), U.S. Vice Consul in France 1939–41, U.S. Vice Consul in Portugal, U.S. Vice Consul in Argentina. Son of Hiram Bingham III.
  - Jonathan Brewster Bingham (1914–1986), U.S. Representative from New York 1965–83. Son of Hiram Bingham III.

== Binghams of New Hampshire ==
- George A. Bingham, delegate to the Democratic National Convention 1860, Justice of the New Hampshire Supreme Court 1876–80 1884–91. Father of George Hutchins Bingham.
  - George Hutchins Bingham (1864–1949), Justice of the New Hampshire Supreme Court 1902–13, Judge of the U.S. Court of Appeals 1913–39. Son of George A. Bingham.

== Binghams and Wardens ==
- Kinsley S. Bingham (1808–1861), Michigan State Representative 1837–39 1841–42, U.S. Representative from Michigan 1847–51, Governor of Michigan 1855–59, delegate to the Republican National Convention 1856, U.S. Senator from Michigan 1859–1861. Brother-in-law of Robert Warden Jr.
- Robert Warden Jr., delegate to the Michigan Constitutional Convention 1850. Brother-in-law of Kinsley S. Bingham.

== Binghams and Willings ==
- Thomas Willing (1731–1821), Philadelphia, Pennsylvania Common Councilman 1755; Philadelphia, Pennsylvania Alderman 1759; Justice of the Philadelphia, Pennsylvania City Court; Common Pleas Court Judge in Pennsylvania Colony; Mayor of Philadelphia, Pennsylvania 1763; Justice of the Pennsylvania Supreme Court 1767–77; member of the Committee of Correspondence in Pennsylvania Colony 1774; member of the Committee of Safety in Pennsylvania Colony 1775; Pennsylvania Colony Representative; Delegate to the Continental Congress from Pennsylvania 1775–76. Father-in-law of William Bingham.
  - William Bingham (1752–1804), Delegate to the Continental Congress from Pennsylvania 1786–88, Pennsylvania State Representative 1790–91, Pennsylvania State Senator 1794–95, U.S. Senator from Pennsylvania 1795–1801. Son-in-law of Thomas Willing.

== Bishops ==
- William D. Bishop (1827–1904), U.S. Representative from Connecticut 1857–59, U.S. Commissioner of Patents 1859–60, delegate to the Democratic National Convention 1860, Connecticut State Senator 1866 1877–78, Connecticut State Representative 1871, candidate for U.S. Representative from Connecticut 1902. Father of Henry A. Bishop.
  - Henry A. Bishop, Connecticut State Representative 1886, delegate to the Democratic National Convention 1888, candidate for Connecticut Secretary of State 1888, candidate for Lieutenant Governor of Connecticut 1904. Son of William D. Bishop.

== Bivinses and Dewhursts ==
- Teel Bivins (1947–2009), Texas State Senator of District 31 1989–2004 and US ambassador to Sweden 2004–06.
- David Dewhurst (born 1945), Lt. Gov. of Texas, married Bivins' ex-wife, Tricia Hamilton Bivins.

== Blacks of Alabama, Florida, and New Mexico ==
- Hugo Black (1886–1971), Associate Justice of the United States Supreme Court (1937–1971), United States Senator from Alabama (1927–1937); Father of Hugo Black Jr. and Sterling Foster Black; grandfather of Hugo Black III.
  - Hugo Black Jr. (1922–2013), Lawyer (Alabama, Florida); legal writer. Son of Hugo Black.
    - Hugo Black III (1953–2007), Lawyer (Florida); served in the Florida House of Representatives (1976–1978). Son of Hugo Black Jr.; grandson of Hugo Black, nephew of Sterling Foster Black.
  - Sterling Foster Black (1924–1996), Lawyer (New Mexico); served in the New Mexico Senate (1960–1968). Son of Hugo Black; brother of Hugo Black Jr.; uncle of Hugo Black III

== Blacks of Georgia ==
- Edward Junius Black (1806–1846), Georgia State Representative 1829–31, U.S. Representative from Georgia 1839–41 1842–45. Father of George Robinson Black.
  - George Robinson Black (1835–1886), delegate to the Georgia Constitutional Convention 1865, delegate to the Democratic National Convention 1872, Georgia State Senator 1874–77, U.S. Representative from Georgia 1881–83. Son of Edward Junius Black.

== Blacks of Pennsylvania ==
- Jeremiah S. Black (1810–1883), Pennsylvania State Court Judge 1842, Chief Justice of the Pennsylvania Supreme Court 1851–54, Attorney General of the United States 1857–60, U.S. Secretary of States 1860–61. Father of Chauncey Forward Black.
  - Chauncey Forward Black (1839–1904), Lieutenant Governor of Pennsylvania 1883–87, candidate for Governor of Pennsylvania 1886. Son of Jeremiah S. Black.

NOTE: Chauncey Forward Black was also son-in-law of U.S. Representative John Littleton Dawson.

== Blacks and Starks of Florida ==
- Susan H. Black (born 1943), County Judge in Florida 1973–75, Circuit Court Judge in Florida 1975–79, U.S. District Court Judge in Florida 1979–92, Judge of the U.S. Court of Appeals 1992–present. Cousin of Bob Starks.
- Bob Starks (born 1945), Florida State Representative 1987–present. Cousin of Susan H. Black.

== Blackburns and Gales ==
- Luke Pryor Blackburn (1816–1887), member of the Kentucky Legislature 1843, Governor of Kentucky 1879–83. Brother of Joseph C.S. Blackburn.
- Joseph C.S. Blackburn (1838–1918), Kentucky State Representative 1871–75, U.S. Representative from Kentucky 1875–85, U.S. Senator from Kentucky 1885–97 1901–07, delegate to the Democratic National Convention 1896 1900 1904, Governor of the Panama Canal Zone 1907–09. Brother of Luke Pryor Blackburn.
  - William H. Gale, U.S. Consul in Puerto Plata, Dominican Republic 1906–07; U.S. Consul in Malta 1907–10; U.S. Consul General in Athens, Greece 1910–14; U.S. Consul General in Munich, Germany 1914–17; U.S. Consul General in Copenhagen, Denmark 1919–20; U.S. Consul General in Hong Kong, China 1921–24; U.S. Consul General in Amsterdam, Netherlands 1926; U.S. Consul General in Budapest, Hungary 1927–29. Son-in-law of Joseph C.S. Blackburn.

== Blackfords ==
- John Blackford (1837–1916), member of the Iowa House of Representatives 1913–15. Father of Aaron Vale Blackford
  - Aaron Vale Blackford (1871–1948), member of Iowa House of Representatives 1925–1933 and Iowa Senate 1929–33. Son of John Blackford.

== Blackledges ==
- William Blackledge (1767–1828), member of the North Carolina House of Commons 1797–99, U.S. Representative from North Carolina 1803–09 1811–13. Father of William Salter Blackledge.
  - William Salter Blackledge (1793–1857), member of the North Carolina House of Commons 1820, U.S. Representative from North Carolina 1821–23. Son of William Blackledge.

== Blagojeviches and Mells ==
- Richard Mell (born 1938), candidate for Democratic Committeeman from Illinois 1972, Chicago, Illinois Councilman 1976–2013; Democratic Committeeman from Illinois 1976–2013. Father of Deborah L. Mell.
  - Deborah L. Mell (born 1968), Illinois State Representative 2009–13, Chicago, Illinois Councilwoman 2013–2019. Daughter of Richard Mell.
  - Rod Blagojevich (born 1956), Illinois State Representative 1993–97, U.S. Representative from Illinois 1997–2003, Governor of Illinois 2003–09. Son-in-law of Richard Mell.

== Blairs ==
- James Blair (1762–1837), Attorney General of Kentucky 1797–1820. Father of Francis Preston Blair.
  - Francis Preston Blair (1791–1876), advisor to presidents Andrew Jackson – Andrew Johnson
    - Montgomery Blair (1813–1883), Postmaster General, 1861–64, son of Francis Preston Blair.
    - Francis Preston Blair Jr. (1821–1875), 1868 Democratic candidate for vice president, Senator from Missouri, 1871–73, son of Francis Preston Blair.
    - B. Gratz Brown (1826–1885), Senator, Governor of Missouri, nephew of Francis Preston Blair.
      - Gist Blair (1860–1940), delegate to the Republican National Convention 1916. Son of Montgomery Blair.
      - Blair Lee I (1857–1944) Senator, maternal grandson of Francis Preston Blair.
      - Blair Lee III (1916–1985) Acting governor of Maryland, "direct descendant" of Francis Preston Blair.

NOTE: Montgomery Blair was also son-in-law of U.S. Secretary of the Treasury Levi Woodbury.

== Blairs of Michigan and New York ==
- Bernard Blair (1801–1880), U.S. Representative from New York 1841–43. Third cousin of Austin Blair.
- Austin Blair (1818–1894), Clerk of Eaton County, Michigan Court; Michigan State Representative 1845; delegate to the Free-Soil Party National Convention 1848; Prosecuting Attorney of Jackson County, Michigan; Michigan State Senator; delegate to the Republican National Convention 1860; Governor of Michigan 1861–65; U.S. Representative from Michigan 1867–73; candidate for Governor of Michigan 1872. Third cousin of Bernard Blair.
  - Charles A. Blair (1854–1912), Prosecuting Attorney of Jackson County, Michigan; candidate for Michigan Circuit Court Judge 1899; Attorney General of Michigan 1903–04; Justice of the Michigan Supreme Court 1905–12; Chief Justice of the Michigan Supreme Court 1909. Son of Austin Blair.

== Blairs of Missouri ==
- James T. Blair (1902–1962), Missouri State Representative 1899–1901, Justice of the Missouri Supreme Court 1915–21 1922–24, Chief Justice of the Missouri Supreme Court 1921–22. Father of James T. Blair Jr.
  - James T. Blair Jr. (1902–1962), Missouri State Representative, delegate to the Democratic National Convention 1936 1960, Mayor of Jefferson City, Missouri 1947; Lieutenant Governor of Missouri 1949–57; Governor of Missouri 1957–61. Son of James T. Blair.

== Blairs of Tennessee ==
- John Blair (1758–1818), member of the North Carolina House of Commons 1788–89, delegate to the North Carolina Constitutional Convention 1788 1789, Tennessee State Representative 1796–97. Father of John Blair.
  - John Blair (1790–1863), Tennessee State Senator 1819–23, U.S. Representative from Tennessee 1823–35, Tennessee State Representative 1849–51. Son of John Blair.

== Blairs of Virginia ==
- John Blair Sr. (1687–1771), member of the Virginia House of Burgesses.
  - John Blair Jr. (1732–1800), Associate Justice of the Supreme Court of the United States 1789–95. Son of John Blair Sr.

== Blakemans ==
- Robert M. Blakeman, New York State Assemblyman from 6th District 1962–64, 19th District 1966. Village Attorney of Valley Stream, New York, 1st President of Franklin General Hospital. Father of Bruce Blakeman and Bradley Blakeman.
  - Bruce Blakeman, Town of Hempstead, New York Councilman 1993–95, 2015–Present, Nassau County, New York Legislator and Presiding Officer 1996–99, Candidate for New York Comptroller 1998, Candidate for US Senate 2010, Candidate for Congress 2014. Board of Commissioners of the Port Authority of New York and New Jersey 2001–09 Son of Robert Blakeman, brother of Bradley Blakeman.
  - Bradley A. Blakeman, President of Freedom Watch, member of George W. Bush Senior Staff 2001–04 (Deputy Assistant to the President for Appointments and Scheduling, Vetting and Research, Correspondence and Surrogate Scheduling). Son of Robert Blakeman, brother of Bruce Blakeman.

== Blakes and Lintons ==
- Thomas H. Blake (1792–1849), U.S. Attorney of Indiana 1817–18, Indiana State Court Judge 1818, Indiana State Representative 1819–20 1823–24, Indiana State Senator 1821–22 1829–30, U.S. Representative from Indiana 1827–29, candidate for U.S. Senate from Illinois 1831 1838. Brother-in-law of William Crawford Linton.
- William Crawford Linton (1795–1835), Indiana State Senator 1828–31, candidate for U.S. Representative from Indiana 1833. Brother-in-law of Thomas H. Blake.

== Blanchards ==
- George Washington Blanchard (1884–1964), Wisconsin State Assemblyman 1925–27, Wisconsin State Senator 1927–33, U.S. Representative from Wisconsin 1933–35. Father of David Blanchard.
  - David Blanchard (1921–1962), Wisconsin State Assemblyman 1955–62. Son of George Washington Blanchard.
  - Carolyn Blanchard Allen (1921–2018), Wisconsin State Assemblywoman 1963–70. Wife of David Blanchard.

== Blatchfords ==
- Richard Milford Blatchford (1798–1875), New York State Assemblyman 1855, U.S. Minister to the Papal States 1862–1863. Father of Samuel M. Blatchford.
  - Samuel M. Blatchford (1820–1893), U.S. District Court Judge in New York 1867–1878, Judge of the U.S. Court of Appeals 1878–1882, Justice of the U.S. Supreme Court 1882–1893. Son of Richard Milford Blatchford.

== Blatts ==
- Solomon Blatt Sr. (1895–1986), South Carolina State Representative 1932–86.
  - Solomon Blatt Jr. (1921–2016), Judge of the United States District Court for the District of South Carolina 1971–90. Son of Solomon Blatt Sr.

== Bleases ==
- Coleman Livingston Blease (1868–1942), South Carolina State Representative 1890–94 1899–1900, South Carolina State Senator 1905–08, Governor of South Carolina 1911–15, U.S. Senator from South Carolina 1925–31, delegate to the Democratic National Convention 1928. Brother of Eugene S. Blease.
- Eugene S. Blease, Justice of the South Carolina Supreme Court 1927–31, Chief Justice of the South Carolina Supreme Court 1931–34, delegate to the Democratic National Convention 1944. Brother of Coleman Livingston Blease.

== Bledsoes and Chiltons ==
- Jesse Bledsoe (1776–1836), Kentucky Secretary of State, Kentucky State Representative 1812, U.S. Senator from Kentucky 1813–14, Kentucky State Senator 1817–20. Uncle of Robert Emmett Bledsoe Baylor, Thomas Chilton, and William Parish Chilton.
  - Robert Emmett Bledsoe Baylor (1793–1874), Kentucky State Representative 1819–20, Alabama State Representative 1824, U.S. Representative from Alabama 1829–31, District Judge of the Republic of Texas, Justice of the Republic of Texas Supreme Court. Nephew of Jesse Bledsoe.
  - Thomas Chilton (1798–1854), Kentucky State Representative, U.S. Representative from Kentucky 1828–31 1833–35. Nephew of Jesse Bledsoe.
  - William Parish Chilton (1810–1871), member of the Alabama Legislature 1839, U.S. Representative from Alabama 1843, Justice of the Alabama Supreme Court 1852–56, Alabama State Senator 1859, Delegate to the Confederate Congress from Alabama 1861–62, Confederate Representative from Alabama 1862–65. Nephew of Jesse Bledsoe.

== Bleeckers of Albany, N.Y. ==
- Jan Jansen Bleecker (1641–1732), Mayor of Albany, 1700–01
- Johannes Bleecker Mayor of Albany, 1701–02
- Rutger Bleecker, Mayor of Albany, 1726–29
- Charles Edward Bleecker Mayor of Albany, 1868–70
- Anthony Bleecker Banks (1835–1910), Mayor of Albany, 1876–78, 1884–86
- Harmanus Bleecker (1779–1849), United States Representative from New York, 1811–1813, Member of New York State Assembly 1814–1815 Chargé d'Affaires to the Netherlands 1837–1842

== Bliss ==
- Harvey Bliss (1791–1874), New York Assemblyman 1839. Second cousin of Albert Bliss.
  - F. Walter Bliss, Justice of the New York Supreme Court 1933–44. Great-grandson of Harvey Bliss.
- Albert Bliss (1811–1876), Rhode Island State Representative, Rhode Island State Senator. Second cousin of Harvey Bliss.
- Cornelius N. Bliss (1833–1911), Chairman of the New York Republican Committee 1887–89, U.S. Secretary of the Interior 1897–99, delegate to the Republican National Convention 1900 1904. Fourth cousin once removed of Albert Bliss.
  - Cornelius N. Bliss Jr. (1874–1949), delegate to the Republican National Convention 1924 1928. Son of Cornelius N. Bliss.

== Bliss of Michigan ==
- Lyman W. Bliss (1836–1907), Mayor of Saginaw, Michigan 1879–81 1888–89; candidate for Mayor of Saginaw, Michigan 1890. Brother of Aaron T. Bliss.
- Aaron T. Bliss (1837–1906), Michigan State Senator 1883, U.S. Representative from Michigan 1889–91, Governor of Michigan 1901–04. Brother of Lyman W. Bliss.

== Blitches ==
- Iris Blitch (1912–1993), candidate for Georgia State Representative 1940, Georgia State Senator 1947–1948 1953–54, delegate to the Democratic National Convention 1948 1952, Democratic National Committeewoman 1948–56, Georgia State Representative 1949–50, U.S. Representative from Georgia 1955–63. Mother of Brooks E. Blitch III.
  - Brooks E. Blitch III, Superior Court Judge in Georgia. Son of Iris Blitch.
  - Peg Blitch (1934–2021), Georgia State Representative 1990–92, Georgia State Senator 1992–2005. Wife of Brooks E. Blitch III.

== Bloods ==
- William Blood, Kaysville, Utah Councilman. Father of Henry H. Blood.
  - Henry H. Blood (1872–1942), Governor of Utah 1933–41. Son of William Blood.

== Bloomers ==
- Asa S. Bloomer (1891–1963), Speaker of the Vermont House of Representatives (1943–45) and President Pro Tem of the Vermont Senate (1949–51, 1955–57, 1959–63). Father of Robert A. Bloomer and John H. Bloomer Sr.
  - Robert A. Bloomer (1921–1999), President Pro Tem of the Vermont Senate (1975–85). Son of Asa S. Bloomer.
  - John H. Bloomer Sr. (1930–1995), President Pro Tem of the Vermont Senate (1993–95). Son of Asa S. Bloomer.
  - Judith Wener Bloomer Crowley (born 1936), Vermont Senate (1995–97), Vermont House of Representatives (2001–05). Wife of John H. Bloomer Sr., mother of John H. Bloomer Jr.
    - John H. Bloomer Jr. (born 1960), Vermont Senate (1997–2005). Secretary of the Vermont Senate (2011–present). Son of John H. Bloomer Sr. and Judith Wener Bloomer Crowley.

== Blounts ==
- William Blount (1749–1800), member of the North Carolina House of Commons 1780–84, Delegate to the Continental Congress from North Carolina 1782–83 1786–87, North Carolina State Senator 1788–90, Governor of the Southwest Territory 1790, U.S. Senator from Tennessee 1796–97, Tennessee State Senator 1798–1800. Brother of Thomas Blount and Willie Blount.
  - William Grainger Blount (1784–1827), Tennessee State Representative 1811, Tennessee Secretary of State 1811–15, U.S. Representative from Tennessee 1815–19. Son of William Blount.
- Thomas Blount (1759–1812), U.S. Representative from North Carolina 1793–99 1805–09 1811–12. Brother of William Blount and Willie Blount.
- Willie Blount (1768–1835), Judge in Tennessee, Tennessee State Representative 1807–09, Governor of Tennessee 1809–15, candidate for Governor of Tennessee 1827, delegate to the Tennessee Constitutional Convention 1837. Brother of William Blount and Thomas Blount.
  - Hill McAlister (1875–1959), Tennessee State Senator 1911–13, Chairman of the Tennessee Democratic Party 1918–20, Treasurer of Tennessee 1919–27 1931–33, Governor of Tennessee 1933–37. Great-great-grandson of Willie Blount.

NOTE: Hill McAlister was also great-grandson of U.S. Postmaster General Aaron V. Brown (1795–1859). McAlister was also the son-in-law of Supreme Court Justice Howell Edmunds Jackson (1832–1895).

== Blounts of Georgia ==
- James H. Blount (1837–1903), delegate to the Georgia Constitutional Convention 1865, U.S. Representative from Georgia 1873–93, U.S. Minister to the Kingdom of Hawaii 1893. Father of James H. Blount Jr.
  - James H. Blount Jr. (1869–1918), U.S. District Court Judge in the Philippines 1901–05. Son of James H. Blount.

NOTE: James H. Blount Jr. was also former son-in-law of U.S. Senator Braxton B. Comer.

== Blows ==
- George Blow Jr. (1813–1894), Texas Republic Representative 1840–41, Virginia Circuit Court Judge 1870–86. Third cousin of Henry T. Blow.
- Henry T. Blow (1817–1875), Missouri State Representative 1854–58, U.S. Minister to Venezuela 1861–62, U.S. Representative from Missouri 1863–67, U.S. Minister to Brazil 1869–71. Third cousin of George Blow Jr.
  - Katharine C. Blow (1897–1965), candidate for Virginia House Delegate 1949, candidate for Democratic nomination for U.S. Representative from Virginia 1950. Granddaughter-in-law of George Blow Jr.

== Blumenthals ==
- Richard Blumenthal (born 1946), United States Attorney for the District of Connecticut 1977–81, Connecticut State Representative 1985–87, Connecticut State Senator 1987–91, Attorney General of Connecticut 1991–2011, U.S. Senator from Connecticut 2011–present.
  - Matt Blumenthal (born 1986), Connecticut State Representative 2019–present. Son of Richard Blumenthal.

== Blunts ==
- Leroy Blunt (1921–2016), Missouri State Representative, father of Roy Blunt, grandfather of Matt Blunt
  - Roy Blunt (born 1950), US Senator and Congressman from Missouri, son of Leroy Blunt
    - Matt Blunt (born 1970), Governor of Missouri, son of Roy Blunt

== Blunts of Delaware ==
- Ted Blunt (born 1943), Wilmington, Delaware Councilman; President of the Wilmington, Delaware City Council 2001–2009; candidate for the Democratic nomination for Lieutenant Governor of Delaware 2008. Father of Lisa Blunt Rochester.
  - Lisa Blunt Rochester (born 1962), U.S. Representative from Delaware 2017–present. Daughter of Ted Blunt.

== Boardmans ==
- Elijah Boardman (1760–1823), Connecticut State Representative 1803–05 1816, Connecticut State Senator 1817–21, U.S. Senator from Connecticut 1821–23. Brother of David Sherman Boardman.
  - William Whiting Boardman (1794–1871), Connecticut State Senator 1830–32, Connecticut State Representative 1836–39 1845 1849–51, U.S. Representative from Connecticut 1840–43. Son of Elijah Boardman.
    - Mabel Thorp Boardman (1860–1946), member of the District of Columbia Board of Commissioners 1920–21. Great-granddaughter of Elijah Boardman.
- David Sherman Boardman (1786–1864), Justice of the Peace in Connecticut, Connecticut State Representative. Brother of Elijah Boardman

== Boehnes ==
- John W. Boehne (1856–1946), Evansville, Indiana Councilman 1897–1901; candidate for Mayor of Evansville, Indiana 1901; Mayor of Evansville, Indiana 1905–08; delegate to the Democratic National Convention 1908; U.S. Representative from Indiana 1909–13. Father of John W. Boehne Jr.
  - John W. Boehne Jr. (1895–1973), U.S. Representative from Indiana 1931–43. Son of John W. Boehne.

== Boggses ==
- Hale Boggs, (1914–1972), Representative of Louisiana 1941–43, 1947–73, Democratic Whip 1961–71, Democratic Majority Leader 1971–73, presumed dead in 1973 with House Resolution 1. Husband of Lindy Boggs.
- Lindy Boggs, (1916–2013), Representative of Louisiana 1973–91, US Ambassador to the Vatican 1997–2001. Wife of Hale Boggs.
  - Barbara Boggs Sigmund (1939–1990), elected Mayor of Princeton, New Jersey, in 1983 and 1987, died in office, daughter of Hale and Lindy Boggs
  - Thomas Hale Boggs Jr. (1941–2014), lawyer and lobbyist based in Washington, D.C., founder of Patton Boggs consultants, son of Hale and Lindy Boggs
  - Cokie Roberts (1943–2019), ABC News political commentator, daughter of Hale and Lindy Boggs
  - Steven V. Roberts (born 1943), political commentator, journalist, and columnist, husband of Cokie Roberts

== Bolands ==
- Christopher G. Boland (1854–1924), delegate to the Democratic National Convention 1896. Brother of William P. Boland.
- William P. Boland (1863–1931), candidate for U.S. Representative from Pennsylvania 1924. Brother of Christopher G. Boland.
- Patrick J. Boland (1880–1942), Scranton, Pennsylvania Councilman 1905–06; member of the Scranton, Pennsylvania School Board 1907–09; Commissioner of Lackawanna County, Pennsylvania 1915–19; U.S. Representative from Pennsylvania 1931–42. First cousin of Christopher G. Bland and William P. Bland.
- Veronica G. Boland (1899–1982), U.S. Representative from Pennsylvania 1942–43. Wife of Patrick J. Boland.

== Bolins ==
- James E. Bolin (1914–2002), member of the Louisiana House of Representatives 1940–44, district attorney of Bossier and Webster parishes 1948–52, judge of the Louisiana 26th Judicial District 1952–60, judge of the Louisiana Second Circuit Court of Appeal, based in Shreveport, 1960–78, when he retired; father of Bruce M. Bolin
  - Bruce M. Bolin (born 1950), member of the Louisiana House of Representatives 1979–90 and 26th Judicial District judge from Bossier and Webster parishes 1991 to 2012, his retirement; son of James E. Bolin

== Boltons ==
- Henry B. Payne (1810–1896), Clerk of Cleveland, Ohio 1836; Ohio State Senator 1849–51; candidate for U.S. Senate from Ohio 1851; candidate for Governor of Ohio 1857; U.S. Representative from Ohio 1875–77; candidate for the Democratic nomination for President of the United States 1880, 1884; U.S. Senator from Ohio 1885–91. Grandfather of Frances P. Bolton.
  - Frances P. Bolton (1885–1977), Ohio Republican Committeewoman 1937–40, U.S. Representative from Ohio 1940–69, delegate to the Republican National Convention 1948, 1956, 1960, 1964, 1968. Granddaughter of Henry B. Payne.
  - Chester C. Bolton (1882–1939), Lyndhurst, Ohio Councilman 1918–21; Ohio State Senator 1923–28; delegate to the Republican National Convention 1928; U.S. Representative from Ohio 1929–37 1939. Husband of Frances P. Bolton.
    - Oliver P. Bolton (1917–1972), U.S. Representative from Ohio 1953–57, 1965–67. Son of Frances P. Bolton and Chester C. Bolton.

== Bonamicis and Simons ==
- Suzanne Bonamici (born 1954), Oregon State Representative 2007–08, Oregon State Senator 2008–11, U.S. Representative from Oregon 2012–present.
- Michael H. Simon (born 1956), Judge of the United States District Court for the District of Oregon 2011–present. Husband of Suzanne Bonamici.

== Bonds and Grosvenors ==
- Charles H. Grosvenor (1833–1917), Ohio State Representative 1874–78, delegate to the Republican National Convention 1896 1900, U.S. Representative from Ohio 1885–91 1893–1907. Uncle of Charles G. Bond.
  - Charles G. Bond (1877–1974), U.S. Representative from New York 1921–23. Nephew of Charles H. Grosvenor.

== Bonhams and Brooks ==
- Milledge Luke Bonham (1813–1890), South Carolina State Representative 1840–43 1865–66, Circuit Court Judge Solicitor in South Carolina 1848–57, U.S. Representative from South Carolina 1857–60, Confederate States Representative from South Carolina 1862, Governor of South Carolina 1862–64, delegate to the Democratic National Convention 1868. Cousin of Preston S. Brooks.
- Preston S. Brooks (1819–1857), South Carolina State Representative 1844, U.S. Representative from South Carolina 1853–56 1856–57. Cousin of Milledge Luke Bonham.
  - M.L. Bonham, Circuit Court Judge in South Carolina 1924–30, Justice of the South Carolina Supreme Court 1931–40, Chief Justice of the South Carolina Supreme Court 1940. Son of Milledge Luke Bonham.

NOTE: Preston S. Brooks was also first cousin of U.S. Senator Matthew Butler.

== Boniors ==
- Edward J. Bonior (1922–2001), Mayor of East Detroit, Michigan 1963–67. Father of David E. Bonior.
  - David E. Bonior (born 1945), Michigan State Representative 1973–76, U.S. Representative from Michigan 1977–2003, delegate to the Democratic National Convention 1984 1996 2000 2008, candidate for the Democratic nomination for Governor of Michigan 2002. Son of Edward J. Bonior.

== Bonnens ==
- Dennis Bonnen (born 1972), banker and, since 1997, Republican member of the Texas House of Representatives from District 25 in Angleton in Brazoria County, Texas; brother of Greg Bonnen
- Greg Bonnen (born 1966), neurosurgeon and, since 2013, Republican member of the Texas House of Representatives from District 24 in Friendswood in Galveston County; brother of Dennis Bonnen

== Bontecous and Metcalfs ==
- Jesse H. Metcalf (1860–1942), delegate to the Democratic National Convention 1888, Rhode Island State Representative 1889–1901 1907, U.S. Senator from Rhode Island 1924–37, delegate to the Republican National Convention 1928, Republican National Committeeman 1935–40. Father-in-law of Frederic H. Bontecou.
  - Frederic H. Bontecou (1893–1959), New York State Senator 1934–38 1943–47, delegate to the New York Constitutional Convention 1938, candidate for Lieutenant Governor of New York 1938, Chairman of the Dutchess County, New York Republican Party 1939–42, delegate to the Republican National Convention 1944 1952 1956. Son-in-law of Jesse H. Metcalf.

NOTE: Frederic H. Bontecou was also fourth cousin once removed of Waukegan, Illinois Mayor Asiel Z. Blodgett.

== Booths ==
- Newton Booth (1825–1892), California State Senator 1863, Governor of California 1871–75, U.S. Senator from California 1875–81. Brother of Walter Booth.
  - Fenton Whitlock Booth (1869–1947), Illinois State Representative 1896–98. Judge of the Court of Claims 1905–28, Chief Justice of the Court of Claims 1928–39. Nephew of Newton Booth.
  - Booth Tarkington (1869–1946), Indiana State Representative 1903–04. Nephew of Newton Booth.
    - John Tarkington Jameson (1889–1963), Indiana State Representative 1921–22. Nephew of Booth Tarkington.
    - Donald Ovid Butler Jameson (1891–1967), Indiana State Representative 1917–18. Nephew of Booth Tarkington.
  - Fenton W. Booth (1869–1947), Illinois State Representative 1896–97, delegate to the Republican National Convention 1904, Judge and Chief Justice 1928–39 of the U.S. Court of Claims 1905–39. Nephew of Newton Booth.
- Walter Booth, Mayor of Paris, Illinois. Brother of Newton Booth.

NOTE: Booth Tarkington was also son of Indiana State Representative John Stevenson Tarkington and grandnephew of Indiana State Senator William Clayborne Tarkington. John Tarkington Jameson and Donald Ovid Butler Jameson were also sons of Indiana State Representative Ovid Butler Jameson.

== Boozmans ==
- John Boozman (born 1950), U.S. Representative from Arkansas 2001–11. U.S. Senator from Arkansas 2011–present, Brother of Fay Boozman.
- Fay Boozman (1946–2005), Health Director of Arkansas, candidate for U.S. Senate from Arkansas 1998. Brother of John Boozman.

== Borahs and McConnells ==
- William J. McConnell (1839–1925), Oregon State Senator 1882, delegate to the Idaho Constitutional Convention 1890, U.S. Senator from Idaho 1890–91, Governor of Idaho 1893–97. Father-in-law of William E. Borah.
  - William E. Borah (1865–1940), candidate for U.S. Representative from Idaho 1896, U.S. Senator from Idaho 1907–40, Republican National Committeeman 1908–12, delegate to the Republican National Convention 1916 1920 1924 1928 1932, candidate for the Republican nomination for President of the United States 1936. Son-in-law of William J. McConnell.

Note: It has been generally accepted that William Borah was the likely birth father of Paulina Longworth Strum, daughter of Alice Roosevelt Longworth and granddaughter of President Theodore Roosevelt. (At the time, Paulina's father was assumed to be House Speaker Nicholas Longworth, a Republican from Ohio.)

== Borens and Ryans ==
- Lyle Boren (1909–1992), US Congressman from Oklahoma.
  - David Boren (1941-2025), Governor of Oklahoma US Senator, and president of the University of Oklahoma, son of Lyle Boren.
    - Dan Boren (born 1973), US Congressman from Oklahoma, son of David Boren.
    - Janna Little Ryan, the wife of 2012 Republican vice-presidential nominee Paul Ryan, is the niece by marriage of David Boren (spouse Janna Lou Little).

== Botts and Lewis ==
- John Botts (1802–1869), Virginia House Delegate 1833–39, U.S. Representative from Virginia 1839–43 1847–49, delegate to the Virginia Constitutional Convention 1850 1851. Father-in-law of Lunsford L. Lewis.
  - Lunsford L. Lewis (1846–1920), Attorney of Culpeper County, Virginia 1870–74; U.S. Attorney in Virginia 1874–82 1902–05 1905–12; Justice of the Virginia Supreme Court 1883–95. Son-in-law of John Botts.

NOTE: Lunsford L. Lews was also brother of U.S. Senator John F. Lewis.

== Bottums ==
NOTE: May be incomplete.

- Henry C. Bottum (1826–1913), Wisconsin State Assemblyman. Father of Joseph H. Bottum.
  - Joseph H. Bottum (1853–1946), Register of Deeds of Faulk County, Dakota Territory; South Dakota State Senator; State's Attorney of Faulk County, South Dakota 1900–04, Circuit Court Judge in South Dakota. Son of Henry C. Bottum.
    - Joseph H. Bottum (1903–1984), State's Attorney of Faulk County, South Dakota 1932–36, candidate for the Republican nomination for Governor of South Dakota 1942; candidate for the Republican nomination for U.S. Representative from South Dakota 1950; Lieutenant Governor of South Dakota 1961–62; U.S. Senator from South Dakota 1962–63. Son of Joseph H. Bottum.
- Darius S. Smith (1833–1913), Justice of the Peace, County Commissioner of Faulk County, South Dakota; South Dakota State Senator 1895–96. Father-in-law of Joseph H. Bottum.

== Boucks ==
- William C. Bouck (1786–1859), New York Assemblyman, New York State Senator, Sheriff of Schoharie County, New York, Governor of New York 1843–44. Brother of Joseph Bouck.
  - Gabriel Bouck (1828–1904), Attorney General of Wisconsin 1858–60, Wisconsin Assemblyman 1860 1874, delegate to the Democratic National Convention 1868 1872, candidate for U.S. Representative from Wisconsin 1874, U.S. Representative from Wisconsin 1877–81. Son of William C. Bouck.
  - Charles C. Bouck, New York Assemblyman. Son of William C. Bouck.
- Joseph Bouck (1788–1858), U.S. Representative from New York 1831–33. Brother of William C. Bouck.

NOTE: Charles C. Bouck's daughter, Katherine Lawyer, was also daughter-in-law of New York Governor Alonzo B. Cornell.

== Boudreauxs ==
- Gerald Boudreaux, Democratic member of the Louisiana State Senate for Lafayette, St. Landry, and St. Martin parishes, effective January 2016, brother of Kenneth Boudreaux
- Kenneth Paul Boudreaux (born 1957), District 4 member of the Lafayette City-Parish Council, brother of Gerald Boudreaux

== Boudinots, Bradfords, and Stocktons ==
- Elias Boudinot (1740–1821), New Jersey Assemblyman 1775–77, Delegate to the Continental Congress from New Jersey 1777–78 1781–83, U.S. Representative from New Jersey 1789–95, Director of the United States Mint 1785–1805. Brother of Elisha Boudinot.
  - William Bradford (1755–1795), Attorney General of Pennsylvania 1780–91, Justice of the Pennsylvania Supreme Court 1791–94, Attorney General of the United States 1794–95. Son-in-law of Elias Boudinot.
- Elisha Boudinot (1749–1819), Justice of the New Jersey Supreme Court 1798–1804. Brother of Elias Boudinot.
- Richard Stockton (1730–1781), New Jersey Executive Councilman 1768–74, Justice of the New Jersey Supreme Court 1774–76, Delegate to the Continental Congress from New Jersey 1776. Brother-in-law of Elias Boudinot.
  - Richard Stockton (1764–1828), U.S. Attorney for New Jersey 1789–91, U.S. Senator from New Jersey 1796–99, candidate for Governor of New Jersey 1801 1803 1804, U.S. Representative from New Jersey 1813–15, candidate for Vice President of the United States 1820. Son of Richard Stockton.
    - Robert F. Stockton (1795–1866), Governor of California 1846–47, U.S. Senator from New Jersey 1851–52. Son of Richard Stockton.
      - John P. Stockton (1826–1900), U.S. Minister to the Papal States 1858–61, U.S. Senator from New Jersey 1865–66 1869–75, Attorney General of New Jersey 1877–97. Son of Robert F. Stockton.

== Bouldins and Steeles ==
- Thomas Bouldin (1781–1834), Virginia Circuit Court Judge, U.S. Representative from Virginia 1829–33 1833–34. Brother of James Bouldin.
- James Bouldin (1792–1854), Virginia House Delegate 1825–26, U.S. Representative from Virginia 1834–39. Brother of Thomas Bouldin.
  - David Steele (born 1968), candidate for U.S. Representative from Indiana 1998. Descendant of Thomas Bouldin.

== Boulignys ==
- Francisco Bouligny (1736–1800), colonial official and military governor of Louisiana under Spanish Rule. Father of Charles Dominique Joseph Bouligny and Louis Mauricio Bouligny.
  - Charles Dominique Joseph Bouligny (1773–1833), U.S. Senator from Louisiana 1824–29. Previously served in the legislature of the Territory of Orleans. Uncle of Francis and John Edward Bouligny.
  - Louis Mauricio Bouligny (1781–1862), New Orleans alderman elected in 1808, he represented Jefferson Parish in the Louisiana House of Representatives in 1819, 1832–34, and 1840–42. Father of Francis and John Edward Bouligny.
    - Francis Bouligny (1819–1857), Mayor of Lafayette City, Jefferson Parish, Louisiana. Son of Louis Bouligny and nephew of Charles Dominique Joseph Bouligny.
    - John Edward Bouligny (1824–1864), U.S. Representative from Louisiana 1859–61. Son of Louis Bouligny and nephew of Charles Dominique Joseph Bouligny.

== Bournes ==
- Shearjashub Bourne (1746–1806), Member of the Massachusetts House of Representatives 1782–85 1788–90, U.S. Representative from Massachusetts 1791–95, Justice of the Court of Common Pleas of Suffolk County 1799–1806.
  - Benjamin Bourne (1755–1808), U.S. Representative from Rhode Island 1790–96, Judge of the United States District Court for the District of Rhode Island 1796–1801, Judge of the United States Circuit Court for the First Circuit 1801–02. First cousin once removed of Shearjashub Bourne.

== Boustanys, Edwardses, Reggies and Kennedys ==
- Edwin Edwards (1927–2021), Governor of Louisiana 1972–80 1984–88 1992–96. Uncle-in-law of Charles Boustany.
  - Charles Boustany (born 1956), U.S. Representative from Louisiana 2005–2017. Nephew by marriage of Edwin Edwards, cousin of Victoria Reggie.
    - Edmund Reggie (1926–2013), father of Victoria Reggie. Judge at Crowley, Louisiana.
      - Victoria Reggie (born 1954), daughter of Edmund, lawyer, and wife of U.S. Senator Ted Kennedy.

== Bowdens ==
- Lemuel Jackson Bowden (1815–1864), Virginia House Delegate 1841–46, delegate to the Virginia Constitutional Convention 1849 1851, U.S. Senator from Virginia 1863–64. Uncle of George E. Bowden.
  - George E. Bowden (1852–1908), Collector of Customs of Norfolk, Virginia 1879–85; U.S. Representative from Virginia 1887–91; Republican National Committeeman 1896; delegate to the Republican National Convention 1904. Nephew of Lemuel Jackson Bowden.

== Bowdles and Eyres ==
- T. Lawrence Eyre (1862–1926), Pennsylvania State Senator 1917–22. Third cousin of Stanley E. Bowdle.
- Stanley E. Bowdle (1868–1919), delegate to the Ohio Constitutional Convention 1912, U.S. Representative from Ohio 1913–15, candidate for U.S. Representative from Ohio 1916, Mayor of Clifton, Ohio. Third cousin of T. Lawrence Eyre.
  - Joseph L. Eyre (1905–1976), Mayor of Chester, Pennsylvania 1956–63. Fourth cousin once removed of T. Lawrence Eyre and Stanley E. Bowdle.

NOTE: Joseph L. Eyre was also a descendant of Pennsylvania State Representative John Larkin Jr.

== Bowdoins ==
- James Bowdoin (1726–1790), delegate to the Massachusetts Constitutional Convention 1779 1780, Governor of Massachusetts 1785–87. Father of James Bowdoin III.
  - James Bowdoin III (1752–1811), member of the Massachusetts Legislature 1776–77, delegate to the Massachusetts Constitutional Convention 1779 1780. Son of James Bowdoin.

== Bowdons and Bowies ==
- Franklin Welsh Bowdon (1817–1857), Alabama State Representative 1844–45, U.S. Representative from Alabama 1846–51. Uncle of Sydney J. Bowie.
  - Sydney J. Bowie (1865–1928), Talladega, Alabama City Clerk 1885–86; Talladega, Alabama Alderman 1891; Alabama Democratic Committeeman 1894–99; U.S. Representative from Alabama 1901–07. Nephew of Franklin Welsh Bowdon.

== Bowens and Hardys ==
- Arthur Sherburne Hardy (1847–1930), U.S. Minister to Persia 1897–99, U.S. Consul General in Teheran, Persia 1897–99; U.S. Minister to Greece 1899–1901; U.S. Minister to Serbia 1899–1901; U.S. Minister to Switzerland 1901–03; U.S. Minister to Spain 1902–05. Brother-in-law of Herbert W. Bowen.
- Herbert W. Bowen (1856–1927), U.S. Consul in Barcelona, Spain 1890–95; U.S. Consul General in Barcelona, Spain 1895–98; U.S. Minister to Persia 1899–1901; U.S. Minister to Venezuela 1901–05. Brother-in-law of Arthur Sherburne Hardy.

== Bowies and Johnsons ==
- Walter Bowie (1748–1810), delegate to the Maryland Constitutional Convention 1776, Maryland House Delegate 1780–1800, Maryland State Senator 1800–02, U.S. Representative from Maryland 1802–05. Brother of Robert Bowie.
  - Walter Bowie Jr., Levy Court Judge of Prince George's County, Maryland. Son of Walter Bowie.
    - William Duckett Bowie (1803–1873), Levy Court Judge of Prince George's County, Maryland; candidate for Maryland State Legislature; Maryland House Delegate. Nephew of Walter Bowie Jr.
      - Oden Bowie (1826–1894), Maryland House Delegate 1849, delegate to the Democratic National Convention 1864, Maryland State Senator 1867, Governor of Maryland 1869–72. Son of William Duckett Bowie.
- Robert Bowie (1750–1818), Maryland State Representative 1785–90 1801–03, Maryland State Court Judge 1790–96, Governor of Maryland 1803–06 1811–12, Maryland State Senator 1809–10. Brother of Walter Bowie.
  - Thomas F. Bowie (1808–1869), Maryland House Delegate 1842–48, candidate for Governor of Maryland 1843, candidate for U.S. Representative from Maryland 1850, delegate to the Maryland Constitutional Convention 1851, U.S. Representative from Maryland 1855–59. Grandson of Robert Bowie.
  - Reverdy Johnson (1796–1876), Maryland State Senator 1821–27, U.S. Senator from Maryland 1845–49 1863–68, Attorney General of the United States 1849–50, Maryland House Delegate 1861–62, U.S. Minister to Great Britain 1868–69. Brother-in-law of Thomas F. Bowie.

NOTE: Robert Bowie was also brother-in-law of Maryland House Delegates Benjamin Mackall IV and Thomas Mackall.

== Bowleses ==
- Skipper Bowles, (1919–1986), North Carolina State Representative, North Carolina State Senator, candidate for Governor of North Carolina 1972.
  - Erskine Bowles (born 1945), Administrator of the Small Business Administration 1993–94, White House Deputy Chief of Staff for Operations 1994–96, White House Chief of Staff 1997–98, candidate for U.S. Senator from North Carolina 2002, 2004. Son of Skipper Bowles.

== Boyds and Burleighs ==
- Parker B. Burleigh (1812–1899), Maine State Representative, Maine State Senator. Father of Edwin C. Burleigh.
  - Edwin C. Burleigh (1843–1916), Treasurer of Maine 1885–88, Governor of Maine 1889–93, delegate to the Republican National Convention 1896, U.S. Representative from Maine 1897–1911, U.S. Senator from Maine 1913–16. Son of Parker B. Burleigh.
    - Byron Boyd (1864–1941), Maine Secretary of State 1897–1908, delegate to the Republican National Convention 1908, Chairman of the Maine Republican Party 1908. Son-in-law of Edwin C. Burleigh.

== Boylands ==
- Thomas S. Boyland (1942–1982), Member of the New York State Assembly in 54th District 1977–1982. Brother of William F. Boyland, Uncle of William Boyland Jr.
- William F. Boyland Sr., Member of New York State Assembly in 54th and 55th district 1982–2003. Brother of Thomas S. Boyland, Father of William Boyland Jr. and Tracy L. Boyland.
  - William Boyland Jr. (born 1970), Member of New York State Assembly in 55th district 2003–2014. Nephew of Thomas S. Boyland, Son of William F. Boyland Sr., brother of Tracy L. Boyland.
  - Tracy L. Boyland, Member of New York City Council. Brother of William Boyland Jr., Son of William F. Boyland Sr. Niece of Thomas S. Boyland

== Boyles ==
- Brendan Boyle (born 1977), candidate for Pennsylvania State Representative 2004 2006, Pennsylvania State Representative 2009–2015, U.S. Representative from Pennsylvania 2015–present. Brother of Kevin J. Boyle.
- Kevin J. Boyle (born 1980), Pennsylvania State Representative 2011–present. Brother of Brendan Boyle.

== Bradfords and DeWolfs ==
- William Bradford (1590–1657), Governor of Plymouth Colony 1621–33 1635–36 1637–38 1639–44 1645–57. Great-great-grandfather of William Bradford.
  - William Bradford (1729–1808), Rhode Island Colony Representative, member of the Bristol County, Rhode Island Committee of Safety; member of the Rhode Island Colony Committee of Correspondence 1773–76; Deputy Governor of Rhode Island 1775–78; Delegate to the Continental Congress from Rhode Island 1776; U.S. Senator from Rhode Island 1793–97. Great-great-grandson of William Bradford.
    - James De Wolf (1764–1837), Rhode Island State Representative, U.S. Senator from Rhode Island 1821–27. Son-in-law of William Bradford.
      - James DeWolf Perry, delegate to the Republican National Convention 1868. Grandson of James De Wolf.

NOTE: James DeWolf Perry was also first cousin of U.S. Senator Matthew C. Butler.

== Bradfords and Tauls ==
- Micah Taul (1785–1850), U.S. Representative from Kentucky 1815–17. Grandfather of Taul Bradford.
  - Taul Bradford (1835–1883), Alabama State Representative 1871–72, U.S. Representative from Alabama 1875–77. Grandson of Micah Taul.

== Bradleys ==
- Joseph P. Bradley (1813–1892), Justice of the U.S. Supreme Court 1870–92. Grandfather of J.G. Bradley.
  - J.G. Bradley, delegate to the Republican National Convention 1916. Grandson of Joseph P. Bradley.

NOTE: J.G. Bradley was also grandson of U.S. Secretary of War Simon Cameron and grandson-in-law of U.S. Secretary of State Thomas F. Bayard Sr.

== Bradleys of Vermont ==
- Stephen R. Bradley (1754–1830), County Judge in Vermont 1783, Vermont State Representative 1785, Justice of the Vermont Supreme Court 1788–89, U.S. Senator from Vermont 1791–95 1801–13. Father of William Czar Bradley.
  - William Czar Bradley (1782–1867), U.S. Representative from Vermont 1813–15 1823–27, member of the Vermont Legislature. Son of Stephen R. Bradley.

== Bradleys and Hendersons ==
- Lewis R. Bradley (1805–1879), delegate to the Democratic National Convention 1860, California Assemblyman 1861–62, Governor of Nevada 1871–79. Grandfather of Charles B. Henderson.
  - Charles B. Henderson (1873–1954), Nevada State Representative 1905–07, U.S. Senator from Nevada 1918–21, delegate to the Democratic National Convention 1928 1936. Grandson of Lewis R. Bradley.

== Bradleys, Hornblowers, and Woodruffs ==
- Joseph Coerten Hornblower (1777–1864), Chief Justice of the New Jersey Supreme Court 1832–49.
  - Lewis Bartholomew Woodruff (1809–1875), Judge of the United States Circuit Courts for the Second Circuit 1869–75. Son-in-law of Joseph Coerten Hornblower.
  - Joseph P. Bradley (1813–1892), Associate Justice of the Supreme Court of the United States 1870–92. Son-in-law of Joseph Coerten Hornblower.

== Bradleys and Morrows ==
- William O'Connell Bradley (1847–1914), Prosecuting Attorney of Garrard County, Kentucky 1870; candidate for U.S. Representative from Kentucky 1872 1876; candidate for U.S. Senate from Kentucky 1876; delegate to the Republican National Convention 1880; candidate for Governor of Kentucky 1887; candidate for Republican nomination for Vice President of the United States 1888; Republican National Committeeman 1890–96; candidate for Republican nomination for President of the United States 1896; Governor of Kentucky 1895–99; U.S. Senator from Kentucky 1909–14. Brother-in-law of Thomas Zanzinger Morrow.
  - Christine Bradley South (1879–1957), delegate to the Republican National Convention 1920 1928 1932, Republican National Committeewoman. Daughter of William O'Connell Bradley.
- Thomas Zanzinger Morrow (1836–1913), Kentucky State Senator, Kentucky Circuit Court Judge, candidate for Governor of Kentucky 1883. Brother-in-law of William O'Connell Bradley.
  - Edwin P. Morrow (1877–1935), U.S. District Attorney in Kentucky, candidate for Governor of Kentucky 1915, Governor of Kentucky 1919–23. Son of Thomas Zantzinger Morrow.

NOTE: Christine Bradley South is also connected to the South-Cockrell-Hargis family.

== Bradstreets and Wiggins ==
- Thomas Wiggin (1592–1667), Governor of Upper Plantation of New Hampshire. Grandfather of Andrew Wiggin.
  - Simon Bradstreet (1603–1697), Governor of Massachusetts Bay Colony 1679–86 1689–92. Father-in-law of Andrew Wiggin.
    - Andrew Wiggin (1671–1756), New Hampshire Colony Representative, Justice of the New Hampshire Colony Supreme Court. Grandson of Thomas Wiggin.
      - Elisha Williams (1694–1755), member of the Connecticut Colony Legislature. Great-grandson of Simon Bradstreet.

== Bradys ==
- James H. Brady (1862–1918), Chairman of the Idaho Republican Committee 1904–08, member of Idaho Legislature, Governor of Idaho 1909–11, U.S. Senator from Idaho 1913–18. Great-grandfather of Jerry Brady.
  - Jerry Brady (born 1936), candidate for Governor of Idaho 2002 2006. Great-grandson of James H. Brady.
- John Leeford Brady (1866–1933), member of the Kansas Legislature, newspaper editor, lawyer. Father of Vera Brady Shipman; Brother of James H. Brady.

== Brainerds and Smiths ==
- Lawrence Brainerd (1794–1870), U.S. Senator from Vermont 1854–55, delegate to the Republican National Convention 1856. Father-in-law of J. Gregory Smith.
  - J. Gregory Smith (1818–1891), Governor of Vermont 1863–65. Son-in-law of Lawrence Brainerd.
    - Edward Curtis Smith (1854–1925), Governor of Vermont 1898–1900. Son of J. Gregory Smith.

== Branches ==
- John Branch (1782–1863), North Carolina State Senator 1811–17 1822, Governor of North Carolina 1817–20, U.S. Senator from North Carolina 1823–29, U.S. Secretary of the Navy 1829–31, U.S. Representative from North Carolina 1831–33, Governor of Florida 1844–45. Uncle of Lawrence O'Bryan Branch.
  - Lawrence O'Bryan Branch (1820–1862), U.S. Representative from North Carolina 1855–61. Nephew of John Branch.
    - William A.B. Branch (1847–1910), U.S. Representative from North Carolina 1891–95. Son of Lawrence O'Bryan Branch.

== Brandegees ==
- Augustus Brandegee (1828–1904), Connecticut State Representative 1854 1858–59 1861, U.S. Representative from Connecticut 1863–67, delegate to the Republican National Convention 1864 1880 1884, Mayor of New London, Connecticut; Corporation Counsel of New London, Connecticut 1897–98. Father of Frank B. Brandegee.
  - Frank B. Brandegee (1864–1924), Connecticut State Representative 1888 1899, Corporation Counsel of New London, Connecticut 1889–93 1894–97 1901–02; U.S. Representative from Connecticut 1902–05; Chairman of the Connecticut Republican Convention 1904; U.S. Senator from Connecticut 1905–24. Son of Augustus Brandegee.

== Brandeis, Nagels, and Taussigs ==
- Charles Nagel (1849–1940), Missouri State Representative 1881–83, Republican National Committeeman 1908–12, U.S. Secretary of Commerce and Labor 1909–13. Brother-in-law of Louis D. Brandeis.
- Louis D. Brandeis (1856–1941), Justice of the U.S. Supreme Court 1916–39. Brother-in-law of Charles Nagel.
- Walter M. Taussig (1862–1923), Mayor of Yonkers, New York 1922–23. Brother-in-law of Louis D. Brandeis.

== Branstads, Garlands, and Rosenmans ==
- Samuel Rosenman (1896–1973), Justice of the New York Supreme Court (1st D.) 1936–43, White House Counsel 1943–46.
  - Terry Branstad (born 1946), Iowa state representative 1973–79, Lieutenant Governor of Iowa 1979–83, Governor of Iowa 1983–99, 2011–17, United States Ambassador to China 2017–2020.
  - Merrick Garland (born 1952), Judge of the United States Court of Appeals for the District of Columbia Circuit 1997–2021, United States Attorney General 2021–25. Grandson-in-law of Samuel Rosenman, second cousin of Terry Branstad.
  - Clifford Branstad (1924–2014), Iowa state representative 1979–1997. Second cousin of Terry Branstad.

== Brantleys ==
- Benjamin Daniel Brantley (1830–1891), member of the Georgia Legislature. Father of William G. Brantley.
  - William G. Brantley (1860–1934), Georgia State Representative 1884–85, Georgia State Senator 1886–87, Georgia State Judge 1892–96, U.S. Representative from Georgia 1897–1913, delegate to the Democratic National Convention 1912. Son of Benjamin Daniel Brantley.

== Brauns ==
- Mike Braun (born 1954), Indiana State Representative 2014–17, U.S. Senator from Indiana 2019–2025. Governor of Indiana 2025–present.
- Steve Braun (1959–2022), Indiana State Representative 2012–14, Commissioner of the Indiana Department of Workforce Development 2014–17. Brother of Mike Braun.

== Braxtons, Brockenbroughs, and Stevensons ==
- Carter Braxton (1736–1797), member of the Virginia Colony House of Burgesses 1761–71, member of the Virginia House of Burgesses 1775–76, Delegate to the Continental Congress from Virginia 1776, Virginia House Delegate 1776–83 1785–86 1790–94, member of the Virginia Council of State 1786–91 1794–97. Grandfather-in-law of William Brockenbrough and Andrew Stevenson.
  - William Brockenbrough (1778–1838), Virginia House Delegate 1802–03 1807–09. Grandson-in-law of Carter Braxton.
  - Andrew Stevenson (1784–1857), Virginia House Delegate 1809–16 1818–21, U.S. Representative from Virginia 1821–34, Speaker of the U.S. House of Representatives 1827–34, U.S. Minister to Great Britain 1836–41. Grandson-in-law of Carter Braxton.
    - John White Brockenbrough (1806–1877), Judge of U.S. District Court in Virginia 1846–61, founder of the Washington and Lee University School of Law, Delegate to the Confederate States Provisional Congress 1861–62, Confederate State District Court Judge 1861. Great-grandson of Carter Braxton.
    - John W. Stevenson (1812–1886), Kentucky State Representative 1845–48, delegate to the Democratic National Convention 1848 1852 1856 1880, delegate to the Kentucky Constitutional Convention 1849, U.S. Representative from Kentucky 1857–61, Lieutenant Governor of Kentucky 1867, Governor of Kentucky 1867–71, U.S. Senator from Kentucky 1871–77. Great-grandson of Carter Braxton.
    - Elliott Muse Braxton (1823–1891), Virginia State Senator 1852–56, U.S. Representative from Virginia 1871–73. Great-grandson of Carter Braxton.
      - William Tyler Page, candidate for U.S. Representative from Maryland 1902. Descendant of Carter Braxton.

NOTE: William Brockenbrough was also father-in-law of U.S. Representative Edward Colston and uncle of U.S. Representative William H. Brockenbrough. William Tyler Page was also a relative of Virginia Governor John Tyler Sr.

== Brays ==
- William G. Bray (1903–1979), U. S. Representative from Indiana 1951–75.
  - Richard Bray (born 1934), Indiana House 1974–92, Indiana Senate 1992–2012. Son of William G. Bray.
    - Rodric Bray (born 1969), Indiana Senate 2012–present. Son of Richard Bray.

== Braytons ==
- William Daniel Brayton (1815–1887), Rhode Island State Representative 1841 1851, Rhode Island State Senator 1848 1853, U.S. Representative from Rhode Island 1857–61, delegate to the Republican National Convention 1872, Republican National Committeeman. Father of Charles R. Brayton.
  - Charles R. Brayton (1840–1910), Chairman of the Rhode Island Republican Party 1876–77, Republican National Committeeman 1896–1910, delegate to the Republican National Convention 1900. Son of William Daniel Brayton.

== Breathitts ==
- John Breathitt (1786–1834), Kentucky State Representative 1811, Lieutenant Governor of Kentucky 1828–32, Governor of Kentucky 1832–34. Great-grandfather of John S. Marmaduke.
  - John S. Marmaduke (1833–1887), Governor of Missouri 1885–87. Great-grandson of John Breathitt.
    - James Breathitt Jr. (1890–1934), Lieutenant Governor of Kentucky 1927–31, delegate to the Democratic National Convention 1928. Descendant of John Breathitt.
    - Edward T. Breathitt (1924–2003), Kentucky State Representative 1952–57, Governor of Kentucky 1963–67, delegate to the Democratic National Convention 1980. Nephew of James Breathitt Jr.

NOTE: John S. Marmaduke was also son of Missouri Governor Meredith Miles Marmaduke and nephew of Missouri Governor Claiborne Fox Jackson.

== Breckinridges ==
See Breckinridge family

== Brewers, Fields, and Wells ==
- Stephen J. Field (1816–1899), California Assemblyman 1851–52, Justice of the California Supreme Court 1857–59, Chief Justice of the California Supreme Court 1959–1863, Justice of the U.S. Supreme Court 1863–97. Uncle of David Josiah Brewer.
  - David Josiah Brewer (1837–1910), County Judge in Kansas 1862–65, District Court Judge in Kansas 1865–69, Justice of the Kansas Supreme Court 1870–84, Judge of the U.S. Court of Appeals 1884–90, Justice of the U.S. Supreme Court 1890–1910. Nephew of Stephen J. Field.
    - Wellington Wells (1868–1955), Massachusetts State Senator. Son-in-law of David Josiah Brewer.

== Brewers and Harts ==
- Edward Hart, Justice of the Peace in New Jersey Colony. Father of John Hart.
  - John Hart (1713–1779), New Jersey Colony Assemblyman 1761–71, member of the Hunterdon County, New Jersey Board of Freeholders; member of Committee of Safety in New Jersey; member of Committee of Correspondence in New Jersey; Delegate to the Continental Congress from New Jersey 1776; New Jersey Assemblyman 1776–78; Chairman of the New Jersey Council of Safety 1777–78. Son of Edward Hart.
    - J. Hart Brewer (1844–1900), New Jersey Assemblyman 1876, U.S. Representative from New Jersey 1881–85. Great-great-great grandson of John Hart.

NOTE: John Hart was also a descendant of Flushing, New York Clerk Edward Hart. Hart was also ancestor of Sarah Hart, who married New York State Senator George B. Guinnip.

== Brewsters ==
- William E. Brewster, Maine State Representative 1919–20. Father of Ralph Owen Brewster.
  - Ralph Owen Brewster (1888–1961), Maine State Representative 1917–18 1921–22, Maine State Senator 1923–25, Governor of Maine 1925–29, candidate for U.S. Representative from Maine 1932, U.S. Representative from Maine 1925–41, U.S. Senator from Maine 1941–52, delegate to the Republican National Convention 1956. Son of William E. Brewster.

== Breyers ==
- Stephen Breyer (born 1938), Judge of the United States Court of Appeals for the First Circuit 1980–94, Associate Justice of the Supreme Court of the United States 1994–2022.
- Charles Breyer (born 1941), Judge of the United States District Court for the Northern District of California 1997–2011.

NOTE: Stephen Breyer is also the son-in-law of British politician John Hare, 1st Viscount Blakenham.

== Brices ==
- John Brice Jr. (1705–1766), Clerk of the Anne Arundel County, Maryland Court; Justice of the Maryland Colony Supreme Court; Maryland Colony Governor's Councilman; Chief Justice of the Maryland Colony Supreme Court; Mayor of Annapolis, Maryland 1755–56 1762–63. Father of John Brice III and James Brice.
  - John Brice III (1738–1820), Maryland Governor's Councilman 1779–80, Mayor of Annapolis, Maryland 1780–81. Son of John Brice Jr..
  - James Brice (1746–1801), Mayor of Annapolis, Maryland 1782–83 1788–89; Governor of Maryland 1792. Son of John Brice Jr..

== Briggs ==
- James F. Briggs (1827–1905), New Hampshire State Representative 1856–58 1874 1883 1891 1897, New Hampshire State Senator 1876, U.S. Representative from New Hampshire 1877–83. Father of Frank O. Briggs.
  - Frank O. Briggs (1851–1913), member of the Trenton, New Jersey School Board 1884–92; Mayor of Trenton, New Jersey 1899–1902; Treasurer of New Jersey 1902–07; Chairman of the New Jersey Republican Committee 1904–11; U.S. Senator from New Jersey 1907–13. Son of James F. Briggs.

== Brights ==
- Michael Graham Bright (1803–1881), Indiana State Representative 1838–39, delegate to the Indiana Constitutional Convention 1850 1851. Brother of Jesse D. Bright.
- Jesse D. Bright (1812–1875), Indiana State Court Judge 1834–39, Indiana State Senator 1841–43, Lieutenant Governor of Indiana 1843–45, U.S. Senator from Indiana 1845–62, Kentucky State Representative 1867–71. Brother of Michael Graham Bright.

== Briley ==
- Beverly Briley (1914–1980), Mayor of Nashville, Tennessee (1963–1975). Grandfather of David and Rob Briley.
  - David Briley (born 1964), Mayor of Nashville, Tennessee (2018–2019). Grandson of Beverly Briley, brother of Rob Briley.
  - Rob Briley (born 1966), member of Tennessee House of Representatives. Grandson of Beverly Briley, brother of David Briley.

== Brimmers ==
- Clarence Addison Brimmer Jr. (1922–2014), chairman of the Wyoming Republican Party 1967–71, attorney general of Wyoming 1971–74, United States Attorney 1975, judge of the United States District Court for the District of Wyoming 1975–2013, father of Philip A. Brimmer
  - Philip A. Brimmer (born 1959), United States District judge in Denver, Colorado, since 2008, son of Clarence Addison Brimmer Jr.

== Brinkerhoffs ==
- Henry R. Brinkerhoff (1787–1844), U.S. Representative from Ohio 1843–44. Cousin of Jacob Brinkerhoff.
- Jacob Brinkerhoff (1810–1880), Prosecuting Attorney of Richland County, Ohio 1839–43; U.S. Representative from Ohio 1843–47; Justice of the Ohio Supreme Court 1856–59; Chief Justice of the Ohio Supreme Court 1859–71. Cousin of Henry R. Brinkerhoff.

== Bristows and Drapers ==
- Francis Bristow (1804–1864), Kentucky State Representative 1831–33, Kentucky State Senator 1846, delegate to the Kentucky Constitutional Convention 1849, U.S. Representative from Kentucky 1854–55 1859–61. Father of Benjamin Bristow.
  - Benjamin Bristow (1832–1896), Kentucky State Senator 1863–65, U.S. Attorney of Kentucky 1866–70, U.S. Solicitor General 1870–72, U.S. Secretary of the Treasury 1874–76, candidate for the Republican nomination for President of the United States 1876. Son of Francis Bristow.
    - Ebenezer Sumner Draper (1858–1914), Lieutenant Governor of Massachusetts 1906–09, Governor of Massachusetts 1909–11. Son-in-law of Benjamin Bristow.
      - Eben S. Draper, Massachusetts State Representative 1921–22, Massachusetts State Senator 1923–26, delegate to the Republican National Convention 1928. Son of Ebenezer Sumner Draper.

NOTE: Ebenezer Sumner Draper was also brother of U.S. Representative William F. Draper.

== Brittons and Davis ==
- Forbes N. Britton, Texas State Senator. Father-in-law of Edmund J. Davis.
  - Edmund J. Davis (1827–1883), District Court Judge in Texas 1856–61, delegate to the Texas Constitutional Convention 1866, Governor of Texas 1870–74, Republican National Committeeman 1872–74, candidate for Governor of Texas 1880, candidate for U.S. Representative from Texas 1882. Son-in-law of Forbes N. Britton.

== Brocks ==
- William Emerson Brock I (1869–1950), U.S. Senator from Tennessee 1929–31. Grandfather of William E. Brock III.
  - William E. Brock III (1930–2021), U.S. Representative from Tennessee 1963–71, U.S. Senator from Tennessee 1971–77, Chairman of the Republican National Committee 1977–81, U.S. Secretary of Labor 1985–87, candidate for U.S. Senate from Maryland 1994. Grandson of William Emerson Brock I.

== Brodericks and Kennedys ==
- Andrew Kennedy (1810–1847), Indiana State Representative 1835, Indiana State Senator 1838, U.S. Representative from Indiana 1841–47, candidate for U.S. Senate from Indiana 1847. First cousin of David C. Broderick and Case Broderick.
  - Evender Chalane Kennedy (1842–1893), Indiana State Representative 1875, member of the Kansas Legislature. Son of Andrew Kennedy.
- David C. Broderick (1820–1859), candidate for U.S. Representative from New York 1846, California State Senator 1850–51, U.S. Senator from California 1857–59. First cousin of Andrew Kennedy and Case Broderick.
- Case Broderick (1839–1920), Mayor of Holton, Kansas 1874–75; Prosecuting Attorney of Jackson County, Kansas 1876–80; Kansas State Senator 1880–84; Justice of the Idaho Territory Supreme Court 1884–88; U.S. Representative from Kansas 1891–99. First cousin of Andrew Kennedy and David C. Broderick.

== Brodheads ==
- Richard Brodhead (1811–1863), Pennsylvania State Representative 1837–39, Treasurer of Northampton County, Pennsylvania; U.S. Representative from Pennsylvania 1843–49; U.S. Senator from Pennsylvania 1851–57. Father of Jefferson Davis Brodhead.
  - Jefferson Davis Brodhead (1859–1920), District Attorney of Northampton County, Pennsylvania; delegate to the Democratic National Convention 1892 1904; U.S. Representative from Pennsylvania 1907–09. Son of Richard Brodhead.

NOTE: Jefferson Davis Brodhead was also grandnephew of U.S. Secretary of War Jefferson Davis.

== Brookes ==
- Robert Brooke Sr. (1602–1655), Governor of Maryland Colony 1652. Father of Thomas Brooke Sr..
  - Thomas Brooke Sr. (1632–1676), member of the Calvert County, Maryland House of Burgesses 1663–69 1671–76; Sheriff of Calvert County, Maryland 1660–67; Chief Justice of Calvert County, Maryland Court 1667. Son of Robert Brooke Sr.
    - Thomas Brooke Jr. (1660–1731), Justice of the Peace in Calvert County, Maryland 1679–81 1685–89; Maryland Colony Councilman 1692–1707 1715–22; Justice of the Maryland Colony Supreme Court 1694–1708; acting Governor of Maryland Colony 1720. Son of Thomas Brooke Sr.

NOTE: Robert Brooke Sr.'s son; Baker; was son-in-law of Maryland Colony Governor Leonard Calvert. Thomas Brooke Jr. was also son-in-law of Maryland Colony Assemblyman Thomas Dent Sr.; father-in-law of U.S. Representatives Charles S. Sewall and William Barton Wade Dent and Maryland Colony Assemblyman Philip Lee Sr.

== Brooks and Hinshaws ==
- Edmund H. Hinshaw (1860–1932), Fairbury, Nebraska City Clerk 1889; candidate for U.S. Representative from Nebraska 1898; candidate for U.S. Senate from Nebraska 1901; U.S. Representative from Nebraska 1903–11. Cousin of Edwin B. Brooks.
- Edwin B. Brooks (1868–1933), Superintendent of Schools of Newman, Illinois 1894–97; Superintendent of Schools of Newton, Illinois 1897–1903; Superintendent of Schools of Greenville, Illinois 1903–05; Superintendent of Schools of Paris, Illinois 1905–12; Superintendent of Schools of Jasper County, Illinois 1914–18; U.S. Representative from Illinois 1919–23. Cousin of Edmund H. Hinshaw.

== Brooks and Overtons ==
- Thomas Overton, Judge in Louisiana. Father of John H. Overton.
  - John H. Overton (1875–1948), U.S. Representative from Louisiana 1931–33, U.S. Senator from Louisiana 1933–48. Son of Thomas Overton.
    - Overton Brooks (1897–1961), U.S. Representative from Louisiana 1937–61. Nephew of John H. Overton.

== Brooks and Thomas ==
- John Thomas (1874–1945), delegate to the Republican National Convention 1920 1932 1936 1940 1944, Republican National Committeeman 1924–33, U.S. Senator from Idaho 1928–33 1940–45. Father-in-law of C. Wayland Brooks.
  - C. Wayland Brooks (1897–1957), candidate for U.S. Representative from Illinois 1934, candidate for Governor of Illinois 1936, Republican National Committeeman 1939–52, delegate to the Republican National Convention 1940 1944 1948 1952 1956, U.S. Senator from Illinois 1940–49. Son-in-law of John Thomas.

== Brooms ==
- Jacob Broom (1752–1810), Delaware Assemblyman 1784–86 1788, delegate to the Philadelphia Convention. Father of James M. Broom.
  - James M. Broom (1776–1850), U.S. Representative from Delaware 1805–07, Pennsylvania State Representative 1824. Son of Jacob Broom.
    - Jacob Broom (1808–1864), Clerk of the Philadelphia, Pennsylvania Orphans' Court 1848–52; candidate for President of the United States 1852; U.S. Representative from Pennsylvania 1855–57; candidate for U.S. Representative from Pennsylvania 1858. Son of James M. Broom.

== Broomes ==
- James E. Broome (1808–1883), Florida Probate Court Judge 1843–48, Governor of Florida 1853–57, Florida State Senator 1861. Father of John Dozier Broome and James E. Broome.
  - John Dozier Broome, delegate to the Florida Constitutional Convention 1885, Florida Circuit Court Judge 1887–98. Son of James E. Broome.
  - James E. Broome, Florida State Senator 1897. Son of James E. Broome.

== Broughtons ==
- Needham B. Broughton (1848–1914), North Carolina State Senator 1901–1903
  - Carrie Lougee Broughton (1879–1957), North Carolina State Librarian 1918–1956. Daughter of Needham B. Broughton.
  - Len G. Broughton (1865–1936), doctor and Baptist preacher. Nephew of Needham B. Broughton.
  - J. Melville Broughton (1888–1949), North Carolina State Senator 1927–29, Governor of North Carolina 1941–45, delegate to the Democratic National Convention 1944 1948, U.S. Senator from North Carolina 1948–49. Nephew of Needham B. Broughton. Father of J. Melville Broughton Jr.
- Alice Willson Broughton (1889–1980), First Lady of North Carolina as the wife of J. Melville Broughton.
  - J. Melville Broughton Jr. (1922–1997), candidate for Governor of North Carolina 1968. Son of J. Melville Broughton and Alice Willson Broughton.
  - Celeste Gold Broughton (1925–2022), writer, wife of Robert Bain Broughton, daughter-in-law of J. Melville Broughton and Alice Willson Broughton

== Brouns ==
- Paul Broun Sr. (1916–2005), Georgia State Senator 1963–2001. Father of Paul Broun.
  - Paul Broun (born 1946), candidate for U.S. Representative from Georgia 1990, candidate for Republican nomination for U.S. Senate from Georgia 1996, U.S. Representative from Georgia 2007–2015. Son of Paul Broun Sr.

== Broussards ==
- Robert F. Broussard (1864–1918), Prosecuting Attorney in Louisiana 1892–97, U.S. Representative from Louisiana 1897–1915, U.S. Senator from Louisiana 1915–18. Brother of Edwin S. Broussard.
- Edwin S. Broussard (1874–1934), Prosecuting Attorney in Louisiana 1903–08, candidate for Lieutenant Governor of Louisiana 1916, U.S. Senator from Louisiana 1921–33. Brother of Robert F. Broussard.

== Browns of California ==
- Edmund G. "Pat" Brown Sr. (1905–1996), Governor of California, 1959–67; candidate for the Democratic nomination for president, 1960.
  - Edmund G. "Jerry" Brown Jr. (born 1938), California Secretary of State 1971–75, Governor of California 1975–83, 2011–19; candidate for the Democratic nomination for United States President in 1976, 1980, and 1992; Chair of the California Democratic Party 1989–91; mayor of Oakland, 1998–2006; Attorney General of California 2007–11; son of Edmund G. "Pat" Brown Sr.
  - Kathleen Brown (born 1946), California State Treasurer 1991–95, Democratic candidate for Governor of California 1994, daughter of Edmund G. "Pat" Brown Sr., sister of Edmund G. "Jerry" Brown Jr.
- Harold C. Brown (1908–1998), Justice of the California Court of Appeal, 1966–76, brother of Edmund G. "Pat" Brown Sr.
- Geoffrey F. Brown (born 1943), Commissioner California Public Utilities Commission 2001–present, and the Public Defender of San Francisco 1978–2000, nephew of Edmund G. "Pat" Brown Sr. and Harold C. Brown, cousin of Jerry and Kathleen Brown.

(The Browns are not related to Willie Brown, former Mayor of San Francisco, California and former Speaker of the California State Assembly.)

== Browns of Georgia ==
- Joseph E. Brown (1821–1894), Georgia Circuit Court Judge 1855–57, Governor of Georgia 1857–65, Chief Justice of the Georgia Supreme Court 1868–70, U.S. Senator from Georgia 1880–91. Father of Joseph Mackey Brown.
  - Joseph Mackey Brown (1851–1932), Governor of Georgia 1909–11 1912–13. Son of Joseph E. Brown.

== Browns of Kentucky ==
- John Y. Brown Sr. (1900–1985), Kentucky State Representative 1930–33 1946–47 1954–55 1962–63 1966–67, U.S. Representative from Kentucky 1933–35, candidate for Democratic nomination for U.S. Senate from Kentucky 1936 1942 1948 1960, delegate to the Democratic National Convention 1936 1948 1980, candidate for the Democratic nomination for Governor of Kentucky 1939, candidate for U.S. Senate from Kentucky 1946 1966, member of the Kentucky Legislature 1953–54, candidate for the Democratic nomination for Kentucky State Representative 1973, candidate for the Democratic nomination for U.S. Representative from Kentucky 1980. Father of John Y. Brown Jr.
  - John Y. Brown Jr. (1933–2022), Governor of Kentucky 1979–83, delegate to the Democratic National Convention 1980, candidate for the Democratic nomination for Governor of Kentucky 1980. Son of John Y. Brown Sr.
    - John Y. Brown III (born 1963), Kentucky Secretary of State 1996–2000, candidate for Lieutenant Governor of Kentucky 2007. Son of John Y. Brown Jr.

== Browns of Michigan ==
- Prentiss M. Brown (1889–1973), Prosecuting Attorney of Mackinac County, Michigan 1914–26; Attorney of St. Ignace, Michigan 1916–28; candidate for U.S. Representative from Michigan 1924; candidate for Justice of the Michigan Supreme Court 1928; U.S. Representative from Michigan 1933–36; U.S. Senator from Michigan 1936–43. Father of Prentiss M. Brown Jr. and Paul W. Brown.
  - Prentiss M. Brown Jr., candidate for U.S. Representative from Michigan 1952 1956 1958 1960. Son of Prentiss M. Brown.
  - Paul W. Brown, candidate for Lieutenant Governor of Michigan 1974. Son of Prentiss M. Brown.

== Browns of Michigan (II) ==
- E. Lakin Brown, Michigan State Representative 1841, Michigan State Senator 1855–56 1879–80. Father of Addison M. Brown.
  - Addison M. Brown (1859–1931), Michigan State Senator 1899–1900, candidate for Republican nomination for Michigan State Senate 1928. Son of E. Lakin Brown.
    - Garry E. Brown (1923–1998), delegate to the Michigan Constitutional Convention 1961 1962, Michigan State Senator 1962–66, U.S. Representative from Michigan 1967–79. Grandson of Addison M. Brown.

== Browns of Ohio ==
- Clarence J. Brown (1893–1965), Lieutenant Governor of Ohio 1919–23, Ohio Secretary of State 1927–33, candidate for Republican nomination for Governor of Ohio 1932, candidate for Governor of Ohio 1934, delegate to the Republican National Convention 1936 1940 1944 1948, Republican National Committeeman, U.S. Representative from Ohio 1939–65. Father of Clarence J. Brown Jr.
  - Clarence J. Brown Jr. (1927–2022), U.S. Representative from Ohio 1965–83, delegate to the Republican National Convention 1968 1972 1976 1984, candidate for Governor of Ohio 1982, acting U.S. Secretary of Commerce 1987. Son of Clarence J. Brown.
    - Roy Brown, candidate for Republican nomination for U.S. Representative from Ohio 2002. Son of Clarence J. Brown Jr..

== Browns of Tennessee ==
- Foster V. Brown (1852–1937), delegate to the Republican National Convention 1884 1896 1900 1916, Attorney General in Tennessee 1886–94, U.S. Representative from Tennessee 1895–97, Attorney General of Puerto Rico 1910–12. Father of Joseph Edgar Brown.
  - Joseph Edgar Brown (1880–1939), U.S. Representative from Tennessee 1921–23, Chairman of the Tennessee Republican Party 1922–24, delegate to the Republican National Convention 1924. Son of Foster V. Brown.

== Browns of West Virginia ==
- William G. Brown Sr. (1800–1884), Virginia House Delegate 1832 1840–43, U.S. Representative from Virginia 1845–49 1861–63, delegate to the Virginia Constitutional Convention 1850, delegate to the Democratic National Convention 1860, U.S. Representative from West Virginia 1863–65. Father of William Gay Brown Jr.
  - William Gay Brown Jr. (1856–1916), candidate for U.S. Representative from West Virginia 1896, U.S. Representative from West Virginia 1911–16. Son of William G. Brown Sr.

NOTE: William Gay Brown Jr. was also cousin of U.S. Senator Jonathan Prentiss Dolliver.

== Browns and Howes ==
- Thomas Marshall Howe (1808–1877), U.S. Representative from Pennsylvania 1851–55, delegate to the Republican National Convention 1860. Father-in-law of James W. Brown.
  - James W. Brown (1844–1909), U.S. Representative from Pennsylvania 1903–05. Son-in-law of Thomas Marshall Howe.

== Browns, Bowens, and Francis ==
- John Brown (1736–1803), Treasurer of Rhode Island 1775–96, Rhode Island State Representative 1782–84, Delegate to the Continental Congress from Rhode Island 1784–85, U.S. Representative from Rhode Island 1799–1801. Brother of Jabez Bowen.
  - Benjamin Brown (1756–1831), Massachusetts State Representative 1809 1811–12 1819, U.S. Representative from Massachusetts 1815–17. Nephew of John Brown.
    - John Brown Francis (1791–1864), Rhode Island State Representative 1821–29, Rhode Island State Senator 1831 1842 1845–56, Governor of Rhode Island 1833–38, U.S. Senator from Rhode Island 1844–45. Grandson of John Brown.
- Jabez Bowen (1739–1815), Providence, Rhode Island Councilman 1773 1775; Rhode Island Assemblyman 1777; Deputy Governor 1778–79 1781–86; Rhode Island Superior Court Judge 1776–81; Chief Justice of the Rhode Island Superior Court. Brother-in-law of John Brown.

== Browns and McMillins ==
- Neill S. Brown (1810–1886), Governor of Tennessee 1847–49, U.S. Minister to Russia 1850–53. Brother of John C. Brown.
- John C. Brown (1827–1889), Governor of Tennessee 1871–75, delegate to the Democratic National Convention 1876. Brother of Neill S. Brown.
  - Benton McMillin (1845–1933), Tennessee State Representative 1874, Tennessee State Court Judge 1877, U.S. Representative from Tennessee 1879–99, Governor of Tennessee 1799–1803, U.S. Minister to Peru 1913–19, U.S. Minister to Guatemala 1919–21, delegate to the Democratic National Convention 1928. Son-in-law of John C. Brown.
  - Lucille McMillin, delegate to the Democratic National Convention 1924. Wife of Benton McMillin.

== Brownes ==
- Charles E. Browne (1816–1895), Wisconsin Territory Legislator. Brother of Edward L. Browne.
  - Edward L. Browne (1830–1925), Wisconsin State Senator 1861–62 1867–68, delegate to the Republican National Convention 1868. Son of Charles E. Browne.
    - Edward E. Browne (1868–1945), Prosecuting Attorney of Waupaca County, Wisconsin 1898–1905; Wisconsin State Senator 1907–13; U.S. Representative from Wisconsin 1913–31. Son of Edward L. Browne.

== Brownlows ==
- William Gannaway Brownlow (1805–1877), candidate for U.S. Representative from Tennessee 1842, delegate to the Tennessee Constitutional Convention 1864, Governor of Tennessee 1865–69, U.S. Senator from Tennessee 1869–75. Uncle of Walter Preston Brownlow.
  - Walter P. Brownlow (1851–1910), delegate to the Republican National Convention 1880 1884 1896 1900 1904, Postmaster of Jonesboro, Tennessee 1881; U.S. Representative from Tennessee 1881–83 1897–1910; Republican National Committeeman 1884 1896 1900. Nephew of William Gannaway Brownlow.

== Bruces ==
- William Cabell Bruce (1860–1946), Maryland State Senator 1894–96, candidate for U.S. Senate from Maryland 1916, U.S. Senator from Maryland 1923–29. Father of James Bruce and David K.E. Bruce.
  - James Bruce (1892–1980), delegate to the Democratic National Convention 1956, U.S. Ambassador to Argentina 1957–59. Son of William Cabell Bruce.
  - David K.E. Bruce (1898–1977), Maryland House Delegate 1924–26, U.S. Vice Consul in Rome, Italy 1926; Virginia House Delegate 1939–42; delegate to the Democratic National Convention 1940; U.S. Ambassador to France 1949–52; U.S. Ambassador to Germany 1957–59; U.S. Ambassador to Great Britain 1961–69; U.S. Liaison to China 1873–1974. Son of William Cabell Bruce.

NOTE: David K.E. Bruce was also former son-in-law of U.S. Secretary of the Treasury Andrew W. Mellon.

== Bruckers ==
- Ferdinand Brucker (1858–1904), East Saginaw, Michigan Alderman 1882–84; Probate Court Judge of Saginaw County, Michigan 1888–96; delegate to the Democratic National Convention 1896; U.S. Representative from Michigan 1897–99. Father of Wilber Marion Brucker.
  - Wilber Marion Brucker (1894–1968), Prosecuting Attorney of Saginaw County, Michigan 1923–27; Attorney General of Michigan 1928–30; Governor of Michigan 1931–33; candidate for U.S. Senate from Michigan 1936; U.S. Secretary of the Army 1955–61. Son of Ferdinand Brucker.

== Brumms ==
- Charles N. Brumm (1838–1917), U.S. Representative from Pennsylvania 1881–89 1895–99 1906–09, delegate to the Republican National Convention 1884, Judge of Schuylkill County, Pennsylvania Court of Common Pleas 1909–17. Father of George F. Brumm.
  - George F. Brumm (1880–1934), candidate for U.S. Representative from Pennsylvania 1918 1920, U.S. Representative from Pennsylvania 1923–27 1929–34. Son of Charles N. Brumm.

== Bryans ==
- Silas Bryan (1822–1880), Illinois state senator, Illinois judge.
  - William Jennings Bryan (1860–1925), U.S. Representative from Nebraska, Democratic nominee for President of the United States 1896 1900 1908, U.S. Secretary of State, son of Silas Bryan.
    - Ruth Bryan Owen (1885–1954), U.S. Representative from Florida, U.S. Ambassador to Denmark, daughter of William Jennings Bryan.
      - Rudd Brown, delegate to the Democratic National Convention 1956 1960, candidate for U.S. Representative from California 1958 1960. Daughter of Ruth Bryan Owen.
    - William Jennings Bryan Jr. (1889–1978), assistant U.S. Attorney, Collector of Customs for the port of Los Angeles, son of William Jennings Bryan.
  - Charles W. Bryan (1867–1945), Mayor of Lincoln, Nebraska; Governor of Nebraska; Democratic nominee for Vice President of the United States 1924; son of Silas Bryan; brother of William Jennings Bryan.
  - T.S. Allen, Chairman of the Nebraska Democratic Party 1904–09 1921–32, U.S. Attorney of Nebraska 1915–21, delegate to the Democratic National Convention 1924 1932 1940. Brother-in-law of William Jennings Bryan.

== Bryans of Florida ==
- Nathan P. Bryan (1872–1935), Florida State Senator 1911, U.S. Senator from Florida 1911–17, Judge of U.S. Court of Appeals for Florida 1920–35. Brother of William James Bryan.
- William James Bryan (1876–1908), Solicitor of the Duval County, Florida Criminal Court of Record 1902–07; U.S. Senator from Florida 1907–08. Brother of Nathan P. Bryan.

== Bryans of North Carolina and Tennessee ==
- Joseph Hunter Bryan (1782–1839), North Carolina State Representative 1804–05 1807–09, U.S. Representative from North Carolina 1815–19. Brother of Henry Hunter Bryan.
- Henry Hunter Bryan (1786–1835), U.S. Representative from Tennessee 1819–21. Brother of Joseph Hunter Bryan.

== Bryans of Virginia ==
- Albert Vickers Bryan (1899–1984), Judge of the United States District Court for the Eastern District of Virginia 1947–61, Judge of the United States Court of Appeals for the Fourth Circuit 1961–72.
  - Albert Vickers Bryan Jr. (1926–2019), Judge of the United States District Court for the Eastern District of Virginia 1971–91. Son of Albert Vickers Bryan.

== Bryans of Washington ==
- James W. Bryan (1874–1956), Washington State Senator 1908–12, U.S. Representative from Washington 1913–15, Prosecuting Attorney of Kitsap County, Washington. Father of James W. Byran Jr.
  - James W. Byran Jr., Prosecuting Attorney of Kitsap County, Washington 1931–32; candidate for Washington State Senate 1956. Son of James W. Bryan.
    - Robert J. Bryan (born 1934), Chairman of the Kitsap County, Washington Republican Party 1961–62; Superior Court Judge in Washington 1967–84; U.S. District Court Judge in Washington 1986–2000. Son of James W. Bryan Jr.

== Bryans and Wellers ==
- John A. Bryan (1794–1864), Auditor of Ohio 1833–39, U.S. Chargé d'Affaires to Peru 1845. Father of Charles H. Bryan.
  - Charles H. Bryan (1822–1877), California State Senator 1854, Justice of the California Supreme Court 1854–55, delegate to the Nevada Constitutional Convention 1863. Son of John A. Bryan.
  - John B. Weller (1812–1875), Prosecuting Attorney of Butler County, Ohio 1833–36; U.S. Representative from Ohio 1839–45; candidate for Governor of Ohio 1848; U.S. Senator from California 1852–57; Governor of California 1858–60; U.S. Minister to Mexico 1860–61. Son-in-law of John A. Bryan.

== Buchanans ==
- James Buchanan Sr. (1761–1821), Justice of the Peace in Mercersburg, Pennsylvania.
  - James Buchanan (1791–1868), Pennsylvania State Representative 1814, U.S. Representative from Pennsylvania 1821–31, U.S. Minister to Russia 1832–33, U.S. Senator from Pennsylvania 1834–45, candidate for the Democratic nomination for President of the United States 1844 1848 1852, U.S. Secretary of State 1845–49, U.S. Minister to Great Britain 1853–56, President of the United States 1857–61. Son of James Buchanan Sr.
    - James Buchanan Henry (1833–1915), Secretary to the President of the U.S. 1857–61, Assistant U.S. District Attorney in New York City (later). Nephew of James.
  - George Washington Buchanan (1808–1832), U.S. Attorney for Western Pennsylvania 1830–32. Son of James.
  - James M. Buchanan (1803–1876), U.S. Minister to Denmark 1858–61. Second Cousin of James Buchanan Henry.

== Buchanans of Florida ==
- Vern Buchanan (born 1951), U.S. Representative from Florida 2007–present.
  - James Buchanan (born 1982), Florida State Representative 2018–present. Son of Vern Buchanan.

== Buchanans of Pennsylvania ==
- Frank Buchanan (1902–1951), U.S. Representative from Pennsylvania 1946–51.
- Vera Buchanan (1902–1955), U.S. Representative from Pennsylvania 1951–55. Wife of Frank Buchanan.

== Buchanans and Pous ==
- Edward W. Pou (1863–1934), Chairman of the Johnston County, North Carolina Democratic Executive Committee 1886; Solicitor in North Carolina 1890–1901; candidate for U.S. Representative from North Carolina 1896; U.S. Representative from North Carolina 1901–34; delegate to the Democratic National Convention 1916. Cousin of James P. Buchanan.
- James P. Buchanan (1867–1937), Justice of the Peace in Washington County, Texas 1889–92; District Attorney in Texas 1899–1906; Texas State Representative 1906–13; U.S. Representative from Texas 1913–37. Cousin of Edward W. Pou.

== Buchanans, Rieckers, and Towsleys ==
- Margaret Towsley (1906–1994), Ann Arbor, Michigan Councilwoman. Mother of Margaret Ann Riecker.
  - Margaret Ann Riecker, Vice Chairwoman of the Michigan Republican Party 1969, Republican National Committeewoman 1971–81, delegate to the Republican National Convention 1972. Daughter of Margaret Towsley.
  - Wiley T. Buchanan Jr. (1914–1986), U.S. Minister to Luxembourg 1953–56, U.S. Ambassador to Luxembourg 1956, U.S. Ambassador to Austria 1975–77. Nephew by marriage of Margaret Towsely.

== Bucks ==
- Daniel Buck (1753–1816), Prosecuting Attorney of Orange County, Vermont 1783–85; delegate to the Vermont Constitutional Convention 1791; Vermont State Representative 1793–94; U.S. Representative from Vermont 1795–97; Attorney General of Vermont 1802–03; Vermont State Representative 1906–07. Father of Daniel Azro Ashley Buck.
  - Daniel Azro Ashley Buck (1789–1841), Vermont State Representative 1816–26 1828–30 1830–34, Attorney of Orange County, Vermont 1819–22 1830–34; U.S. Representative from Vermont 1823–25 1827–29. Son of Daniel Buck.

== Buckinghams ==
- William Alfred Buckingham (1804–1875), Mayor of Norwich, Connecticut 1849; Governor of Connecticut 1858–66; U.S. Senator from Connecticut 1869–75. Father of Edward T. Buckingham.
  - Edward T. Buckingham, Mayor of Bridgeport, Connecticut 1909–11 1929–33. Son of William Alfred Buckingham.

== Buckleys ==
- James L. Buckley (1923–2023), candidate for U.S. Senate from New York 1968, U.S. Senator from New York 1971–77, candidate for U.S. Senate from Connecticut 1980, Judge of the U.S. Court of Appeals 1985–96. Brother of William F. Buckley Jr.
- William F. Buckley Jr. (1925–2008), Founder and Editor of National Review. Candidate for Mayor of New York City 1965. Brother of James L. Buckley.
- L. Brent Bozell Jr. (1926–1997), conservative writer, aide to U.S. Senators Joseph McCarthy and Barry Goldwater, unsuccessful candidate for Maryland House of Delegates 1958, candidate for U.S. Representative from Maryland 1964. Brother-in-law of James L. Buckley and William F. Buckley Jr.
- E. Ross Buckley, candidate for U.S. House of Representatives in 1960 and Mayor of New Orleans, Louisiana in 1962, Reagan administration official, first cousin of William F. Buckley Jr. and James L. Buckley

== Buckleys of Maryland and Pennsylvania ==
- Edward Harper Buckley (1825–1882), Mayor of Baltimore, Maryland from 1862 to 1868, Maryland Representative from 1868 to 1870. District Attorney of New York City 1876–1880. Attorney General of New York 1880–1882. Delegate at 1860, 1864, 1868, 1872, 1876, and 1880 Republican Nation Conventions.
  - Franklin Pierce Buckley (1857–1917) Son of Edward, Republican candidate for Mayor of Philadelphia, Pennsylvania in 1907. Delegate at the 1896, 1900, 1904 1908, and 1912 Republican National Conventions.
    - Bayard Lanning Buckley (1888–1963) Son of Franklin, Republican candidate for Mayor of Philadelphia, Pennsylvania in 1959. Pennsylvania State Senator from 1934 to 1938, Judge of United States Court of Appeals for the Third Circuit from 1938 to 1954. Delegate at the 1928, 1932, 1936, 1940, 1944, and 1948 Republican National Conventions

== Buffingtons ==
- Joseph Buffington (1803–1872), U.S. Representative from Pennsylvania 1843–47, president judge of the eighteenth district of Pennsylvania 1849–51, judge of the tenth district of Pennsylvania 1855–71.
  - Joseph Buffington (1855–1947), Judge of the United States District Court for the Western District of Pennsylvania 1892–1906, Judge of the United States Circuit Courts for the Third Circuit 1906–11, Judge of the United States Court of Appeals for the Third Circuit 1906–38. Nephew of Joseph Buffington.

== Bulkeleys, Brainards, and Morgans ==
- Eliphalet Bulkeley, Connecticut State Senator 1838 1840, Connecticut State Representative. Father of Edwin D. Morgan and William H. Bulkeley.
  - Morgan G. Bulkeley (1837–1922), Mayor of Hartford, Connecticut 1880–88; candidate for Governor of Connecticut 1880; Governor of Connecticut 1889–93; U.S. Senator from Connecticut 1905–11. Son of Eliphalet Bulkeley.
  - William H. Bulkeley (1840–1902), Lieutenant Governor of Connecticut 1881–83. Son of Eliphalet Bulkeley.
  - Edwin D. Morgan (1811–1883), Hartford, Connecticut Councilman 1832; New York City Alderman 1849; New York State Senator 1850–55; Chairman of the Republican National Committee 1856–64 1876–79; Governor of New York 1859–63; U.S. Senator from New York 1863–69. Cousin of Morgan G. Bulkeley.
  - Leveret Brainard, Mayor of Hartford, Connecticut 1894–96. Son-in-law of Eliphalet Bulkeley.

NOTE: Edwin D. Morgan was also uncle of U.S. Consul W.F. Rowland.

== Bullitts ==
- Thomas Bullitt (1730–1778), military officer in the French and Indian War and the American Revolution, also surveyed Kentucky.
- Cuthbert Bullitt (1740–1791), delegate to the revolutionary Provincial Congress of Virginia, Commonwealth Attorney for Prince William County, Virginia, later became a state court judge and delegate to the Virginia Ratifying Convention.
  - Alexander Scott Bullitt (1761–1816), delegate to Kentucky constitutional convention. Served in the Kentucky Senate and later became Lieutenant Governor of Kentucky.
    - John Christian Bullitt (1824–1902), lawyer and Grandson of Alexander Scott Bullitt. Founded law firm of Drinker Biddle & Reath, drafted Philadelphia city charter.
      - William Christian Bullitt (1856–1914), Pennsylvania State Representative. Son of John Christian Bullitt.
        - William Christian Bullitt Jr. (1891–1967), United States Ambassador to the Soviet Union 1933–36, United States Ambassador to France 1936–40, candidate for Mayor of Philadelphia, Pennsylvania 1943. Son of William Christian Bullitt.
        - A. Scott Bullitt (1877–1932), candidate for Governor of Washington 1928. First cousin of William Christian Bullitt Jr.
          - Daniel B. Brewster (1923–2007), Maryland House Delegate 1950–58, U.S. Representative from Maryland 1959–63, U.S. Senator from Maryland 1963–69. Son-in-law of William Christian Bullitt Jr.

== Bullocks ==
- Stephen Bullock (1735–1816), member of the Massachusetts Legislature, U.S. Representative from Massachusetts 1797–99. Granduncle of Nathaniel Bullock.
  - Nathaniel Bullock (1777–1867), Rhode Island State Representative 1825–26, U.S. Collector of Customs 1827–36, Lieutenant Governor of Rhode Island 1842–43. Grandnephew of Stephen Bullock.
    - Richmond M. Bullock (1809–1883), Connecticut State Senator 1880. Third cousin once removed of Nathaniel Bullock.
    - Jonathan Russell Bullock (1815–1899), Rhode Island State Representative 1844–46, U.S. Collector of Customs 1849–53, Rhode Island State Senator 1859–60, Lieutenant Governor of Rhode Island 1860–61, Justice of the Rhode Island Supreme Court 1862–64, U.S. District Court Judge in Rhode Island 1865–69. Son of Nathaniel Bullock.
    - Alexander Bullock (1816–1882), Massachusetts State Representative 1845–49 1862–64, Massachusetts State Senator 1849, Mayor of Worcester, Massachusetts 1859; Governor of Massachusetts 1866–69. Third cousin once removed of Nathaniel Bullock.
    - Benjamin K. Bullock (1821–1901), Mayor of Provo, Utah 1855–60 1863. Third cousin once removed of Nathaniel Bullock.
    - Isaac Bullock (1824–1891), Mayor of Provo, Utah 1863. Third cousin once removed of Nathaniel Bullock.
      - William J. Bullock (1864–1920), Massachusetts State Representative 1898–1903, Massachusetts State Senator 1904–07, candidate for U.S. Representative from Massachusetts 1912. Third cousin three times removed of Nathaniel Bullock.
      - Chandler Bullock (1872–1962), delegate to the Republican National Convention 1944. Grandson of Alexander Bullock.
        - James Robert Bullock (1916–1999), Utah State Representative 1963–67, U.S. District Court Judge in Utah 1973–83. Great-grandson of Benjamin K. Bullock.

== Bullocks and Carrs ==
- Robert Bullock (1828–1905), Judge of the Florida Probate Court 1866, Florida State Representative 1879, U.S. Representative from Florida 1889–93. Uncle of Julian Carr.
  - Julian Carr (1845–1924), delegate to the Democratic National Convention 1888, 1912, 1916. Nephew of Robert Bullock.
  - William Simeon Bullock (1856–1935), Criminal Court Judge in Florida 1882, Circuit Court Judge in Florida. Son of Robert Bullock.

== Bulovas ==
- David Bulova, member of the Virginia House of Delegates
- Gretchen Bulova, member of the Virginia House of Delegates
- Sharon Bulova, Chair of the Fairfax County Board of Supervisors

== Bumperses ==
- William Rufus Bumpers (1888–1949), member of the Arkansas Legislature, 1930s. Merchant and teacher. Father of Dale Bumpers.
  - Dale Bumpers (1925–2016), Governor of Arkansas 1971–75, U.S. Senator for Arkansas 1975–99. Son of William Rufus Bumpers.

== Bunnings ==
- James P. D. Bunning (1931–2017), Kentucky State Senator 1979–83, candidate for Governor of Kentucky 1983, U.S. Representative from Kentucky 1987–99, U.S. Senator from Kentucky 1999–2011. Father of David L. Bunning.
  - David L. Bunning (born 1966), U.S. District Court Judge in Kentucky 2002–present. Son of James P.D. Bunning.

== Burbanks and Kibbeys ==
- John A. Burbank (1827–1905), Governor of Dakota Territory 1869–73. Father-in-law of Joseph H. Kibbey.
  - Joseph H. Kibbey (1853–1924), Justice of the Arizona Territory Supreme Court 1889, Arizona Territory Councilman 1902, Attorney General of Arizona Territory 1904, delegate to the Republican National Convention 1904, Governor of Arizona Territory 1905–09, candidate for U.S. Senate from Arizona 1916. Son-in-law of John A. Burbank.

NOTE: John A. Burbank was also brother-in-law of U.S. Senator Oliver P. Morton (1823–1877). Joseph H. Kibbey was also son of Indiana Attorney General John F. Kibbey in the administration of Morton and also Morton's law partner.

== Burdicks ==
- Usher Burdick (1879–1960), North Dakota State Representative 1907–11, Lieutenant Governor of North Dakota 1911–13, State Attorney of Williams County, North Dakota 1913–15; candidate for Republican nomination for U.S. Representative from North Dakota 1932; U.S. Representative from North Dakota 1935–45 1949–53; candidate for Republican nomination for U.S. Senate from North Dakota 1944; candidate for U.S. Representative from North Dakota 1944. Father of Quentin N. Burdick.
  - Quentin N. Burdick (1908–1992), U.S. Representative from North Dakota 1959–60, U.S. Senator from North Dakota 1960–92. Son of Usher Burdick.
  - Jocelyn Burdick (1922–2019), U.S. Senator from North Dakota 1992. Wife of Quentin N. Burdick.
  - Robert W. Levering (1914–1989), candidate for U.S. Representative from Ohio 1948 1950 1954 1956 1962, U.S. Representative from Ohio 1959–61. Son-in-law of Usher Burdick.

== Burgesses, Gundersons, and Lees ==
- Andrew E. Lee (1847–1934), Governor of South Dakota 1897–1901, candidate for Governor of South Dakota 1908. Brother-in-law of Lyman Burgess and Hans Gunderson.
- Lyman Burgess, Dakota Territory Representative 1862. Brother-in-law of Andrew E. Lee.
- Hans Gunderson, Dakota Territory Councilman 1877–78. Brother-in-law of Andrew E. Lee and Lyman Burgess.
  - Carl Gunderson (1864–1933), South Dakota State Senator 1893 1897–1901 1917, Lieutenant Governor of South Dakota 1921–25, Governor of South Dakota 1925–27. Son of Hans Gunderson.

== Burks ==
- Henry Burk (1850–1903), U.S. Representative from Pennsylvania 1901–03. Brother of Charles D. Burk and Alfred E. Burk.
- Charles D. Burk (1856–1916), delegate to the Republican National Convention 1908. Brother of Henry Burk and Alfred E. Burk.
- Alfred E. Burk (1864–1921), delegate to the Republican National Convention 1920. Brother of Henry Burk and Charles D. Burk.

== Burkes of California ==
- Yvonne Brathwaite Burke (born 1932), U.S. Representative from California 1972–78 and Los Angeles County Supervisor 1992 to 2008. Also the first member of Congress to give birth while in office to Autumn Burke (born 1973), California State Assemblymember 2014 to present.
- William A. "Bill" Burke, founder of the Los Angeles Marathon and South Coast Air Quality Management District board member.

== Burleighs ==
- William Burleigh (1785–1827), U.S. Representative from Maine 1823–27. Father of John H. Burleigh.
  - John H. Burleigh (1822–1877), Maine State Representative 1862 1864 1866 1872, delegate to the Republican National Convention 1864, U.S. Representative from Maine 1873–77. Son of William Burleigh.

== Burlesons ==
- Edward Burleson (1798–1851), Vice President of the Republic of Texas 1841–44, candidate for President of the Republic of Texas 1844, Texas State Senator 1846–50 1851. Father of Edward Burleson Jr.
  - Edward Burleson Jr. (1826–1877), delegate to the Texas Constitutional Convention 1875. Son of Edward Burleson.
    - Albert S. Burleson (1863–1937), U.S. Representative from Texas 1899–1913, U.S. Postmaster General 1913–21. Grandson of Edward Burleson.

== Burnets ==
- William Burnet (1730–1791), member of the Newark, New Jersey Committee of Safety 1775; U.S. Surgeon General 1776–83; Judge of the New Jersey Court of Common Pleas 1776; Delegate to the Continental Congress from New Jersey 1880–81. Father of Jacob Burnet.
  - Jacob Burnet (1770–1853), Northwest Territory Councilman 1799–1802, Ohio State Representative 1814–16, Justice of the Ohio Supreme Court 1821–28, U.S. Senator from Ohio 1828–31. Son of William Burnet.
    - David G. Burnet (1788–1870), President of the Republic of Texas 1836, Vice President of the Republic of Texas 1838–41, Texas Secretary of State 1846–48. Grandson of William Burnet.

== Burneys ==
- Willard H. Burney (1857–1943), Nebraska State Representative 1919. Father of Dwight Burney.
  - Dwight Burney (1892–1987), member of the Nebraska Legislature 1945–57, Lieutenant Governor of Nebraska 1957–60 1961–65, Governor of Nebraska 1960–61. Son of Willard H. Burney.

== Burnhams ==
- Henry L. Burnham, New Hampshire State Senator 1864–66. Father of Henry E. Burnham.
  - Henry E. Burnham (1844–1917), New Hampshire State Representative 1873–74, Treasurer of Hillsborough County, New Hampshire 1875–77; Probate Court Judge in New Hampshire 1876–79; delegate to the New Hampshire Constitutional Convention 1879; U.S. Senator from New Hampshire 1901–13; delegate to the Republican National Convention 1904. Son of Henry L. Burnham.

== Burnses ==
- A. J. Burns Sr. (1907–1976), Democratic member of the Webster Parish School Board from Shongaloo, Louisiana, first elected in 1958 as a write-in candidate; father of Kerry O. Burns and Henry Burns
  - Kerry O. Burns (1940–2015), Democratic property tax assessor of his native Webster Parish, Louisiana, prior to 2004; son of A. J. Burns Sr., and brother of Henry Burns
  - Henry Burns (born 1947), Republican member of the Louisiana House of Representatives for District 9 in Bossier Parish, 2008–16, unsuccessful candidate for Louisiana State Senate in 2015, resident of Haughton; son of A. J. Burns Sr., and brother of Kerry O. Burns

== Burrages ==
- Michael Burrage (born 1950), Judge of the United States District Court for the Eastern District of Oklahoma, the United States District Court for the Northern District of Oklahoma, and the United States District Court for the Western District of Oklahoma 1994–2001.
  - Sean Burrage (born 1968), Oklahoma State Senator 2006–14. Son of Michael Burrage.
- Steve Burrage (born 1952), Oklahoma State Auditor and Inspector 2008–11, Oklahoma Tax Commissioner 2015–present. Brother of Michael Burrage.

== Burrs and Alstons ==
- Aaron Burr (1756–1836), New York Assemblyman 1784–85 1798–1801, Attorney General of New York 1789–91, U.S. Senator from New York 1791–97, Vice President of the United States 1801–05. Father-in-law of Joseph Alston.
  - Joseph Alston (1779–1816), Governor of South Carolina 1812–14. Son-in-law of Aaron Burr.

NOTE: Aaron Burr was also nephew of Continental Congressional Delegate Pierpont Edwards and first cousin of U.S. Representative Theodore Dwight and U.S. Senator Henry W. Edwards. Joseph Alston was also brother-in-law of South Carolina Governor John Lyde Wilson.

== Burrells and Huffs ==
- Jeremiah M. Burrell, District Judge in Pennsylvania. Father-in-law of George Franklin Huff.
  - George Franklin Huff (1842–1912), delegate to the Republican National Convention 1880, Pennsylvania State Senator 1884–88, U.S. Representative from Pennsylvania 1891–93 1895–97 1903–11. Son-in-law of Jeremiah M. Burrell.

== Burrows ==
- Daniel Burrows (1766–1858), Connecticut State Representative 1816–20 1826, delegate to the Connecticut Constitutional Convention 1818, U.S. Representative from Connecticut 1821–23. Uncle of Lorenzo Burrows.
  - Latham A. Burrows (1792–1855), presidential elector 1820; Clerk of Broome County, NY 1821–22; New York State Senator (6th D.) 1824–27; nephew of Daniel Burrows; brother of Lorenzo Burrows
  - Lorenzo Burrows (1805–1885), Treasurer of Orleans County, New York 1840; Supervisor of Barre, New York 1845; U.S. Representative from New York 1849–53; New York State Comptroller 1855–57; nephew of Daniel Burrows; brother of Latham A. Burrows.

== Burrows and Connables ==
- Julius C. Burrows (1837–1915), Prosecuting Attorney of Kalamazoo County, Michigan 1866–70; U.S. Representative from Michigan 1873–75 1879–83 1885–95; U.S. Senator from Michigan 1895–1911. Brother-in-law of Alfred B. Connable Sr..
- Alfred B. Connable Sr., Mayor of Kalamazoo, Michigan 1913–14. Brother-in-law of Julius C. Burrows.

== Burtons ==
- Phillip Burton (1926–1983), California Assemblyman 1956–64, delegate to the California Democratic Convention 1968 1972 1976 1980 1982, delegate to the Democratic National Convention 1968 1972, U.S. Representative from California 1964–83. Brother of John L. Burton.
- John L. Burton (born 1932), U.S. Representative from California 1974–82, California State Senator 1997–2005. Brother of Phillip Burton.
- Sala Burton (1925–1987), delegate to the Democratic National Convention 1956 1976 1980 1984, U.S. Representative from California 1983–87. Wife of Phillip Burton.

== Burtons of Indiana ==
- Danny L. Burton (born 1938), Indiana State Representative 1967–68 1977–80, Indiana State Senator 1969–70 1981–82, U.S. Representative from Indiana 1983–2013. Brother of Woody Burton.
- Woody Burton, Indiana State Representative. Brother of Danny L. Burton.

== Bushfields ==
- Harlan J. Bushfield (1882–1948), Governor of South Dakota 1939–43, U.S. Senator from South Dakota 1943–48
- Vera C. Bushfield (1889–1976), U.S. Senator from South Dakota 1948. Wife of Harlan J. Bushfield.

== Bushongs and Roberts ==
- Anthony Ellmaker Roberts (1803–1885), Sheriff of Lancaster County, Pennsylvania 1839–42; candidate for U.S. Representative from Pennsylvania 1843; U.S. Marshal in Pennsylvania 1850–53; U.S. Representative from Pennsylvania 1855–59; candidate for Mayor of Lancaster, Pennsylvania 1867. Grandfather of Robert Grey Bushong.
  - Robert Grey Bushong (1883–1951), Pennsylvania State Representative 1908–09, Judge of Berks County, Pennsylvania Orphans' Court 1914–15; delegate to the Republican National Convention 1916 1924; U.S. Representative from Pennsylvania 1927–29. Grandson of Anthony Ellmaker Roberts.

== Butlers ==
- Roderick R. Butler (1827–1902), Postmaster of Taylorsville, Tennessee; Tennessee State Senator 1859–63 1893–1901; delegate to the Republican National Convention 1864 1872 1876; delegate to the Tennessee Constitutional Convention 1865; Chairman of the Tennessee Republican Committee; U.S. Representative from Tennessee 1867–75 1887–89; Chairman of the Tennessee Republican Convention 1869 1882; Tennessee State Representative 1879–85. Grandfather of Robert R. Butler.
  - Robert R. Butler (1881–1933), Mayor of Condon, Oregon; Circuit Court Judge in Oregon 1909–11; Oregon State Senator 1913–17 1925–29; U.S. Representative from Oregon 1928–33. Grandson of Roderick R. Butler.

== Butlers of Pennsylvania ==
- William Butler (1822–1909), Common Pleas Court Judge in Pennsylvania 1861–79, U.S. District Court Judge in Pennsylvania 1879–99. Brother of Samuel Butler.
- Samuel Butler, Treasurer of Pennsylvania 1880–82. Brother of William Butler.
  - Thomas S. Butler (1855–1928), Pennsylvania State Court Judge 1888, U.S. Representative from Pennsylvania 1897–1928. Son of Samuel Butler.
    - Smedley Butler (1881–1940), candidate for U.S. Senate from Pennsylvania 1932. Son of Thomas S. Butler.

NOTE: Thomas S. Butler was also son-in-law of U.S. Representative Smedley Darlington.

== Butlers and Belmonts ==
See Butler-Belmont Family

== Butlers and Walkers ==
- James A. Walker (1832–1901), Virginia House Delegate 1871–72, Lieutenant Governor of Virginia, U.S. Representative from Virginia 1895–99. Great-grandfather of M. Caldwell Butler.
  - M. Caldwell Butler (1925–2014), Virginia House Delegate 1962–71, U.S. Representative from Virginia 1972–83. Great-grandson of James A. Walker.

== Byas and Standifers ==
- James Israel Standifer (1782–1837), U.S. Representative from Tennessee 1823–25 1829–37. Great-great-great-grandfather of Steven D. Byas.
  - Steven D. Byas (born 1954), Oklahoma Republican Committeeman 1981–83, candidate for Oklahoma State Representative 1992 1994 1996. Great-great-great-grandson of James Israel Standifer.

== Bynums ==
- R. N. Bynum (1858-1927), 2nd Mayor of Tulsa,1899–1900.
  - G. T. Bynum (born 1977), Member of the Tulsa City Council, 2008-2016; 4th Mayor of Tulsa, 2016-2024. Great-great-grandson of R.N. Bynum.

NOTE: G. T. Bynum is also the grandson of Robert J. LaFortune and the nephew of Bill LaFortune, who both also served as Mayor of Tulsa.

== Byrds and Floods ==
- Colonel William Byrd I (1652–1704), married to Mary Horsmanden, daughter of Sir Warham Horsmanden
  - Colonel William Byrd II (1674–1744) of Westover Plantation—Founded Richmond, Virginia. Member of the Royal Society of Great Britain and served on the Virginia House of Burgesses.
    - William Byrd III (1752–1777) – served on the Virginia House of Burgesses.
      - Charles Willing Byrd (1770–1828), Secretary of Northwest Territory, Judge of the United States District Court for the District of Ohio.
- Colonel William Byrd (1828-1896) moved to Texas and was appointed adjutant general of the Confederate state of Texas. Married the daughter of Robert Jones Rivers
- Richard Evelyn Byrd II, brother to 1828 William Byrd, married Eleanor Bolling Flood the daughter of Henry Delaware Flood, thus uniting these families.
- Henry D. Flood (1865–1921), U.S. Representative from Virginia, 1901–21.
- Joel W. Flood (1894–1964), U.S. Representative from Virginia, 1932–33; brother of Henry D. Flood and uncle of Harry Byrd Sr.
  - Harry F. Byrd Sr. (1887–1966), Governor of Virginia, 1926–30; Vice Chair of the Democratic Party, 1929; candidate for Democratic nomination for president, 1932; U.S. Senator from Virginia, 1933–65; nominee for President of the States Rights Party, 1956; received 15 electoral votes for president, 1960; nephew of Henry D. Flood and Joel West Flood, father of Harry Byrd Jr; brother of Admiral Richard Evelyn Byrd (1888–1957), aviator, explorer.
    - Harry F. Byrd Jr. (1914–2013), U.S. Senator from Virginia, 1965–1983; son of Harry F. Byrd Sr.

(The Virginia Byrds are not related to Sen. Robert C. Byrd of West Virginia, who was born Cornelius Calvin Sale Jr. and renamed after his aunt and uncle Vlurma and Titus Byrd)

NOTE: Harry F. Byrd Jr. is also brother-in-law of Virginia House Delegate James Thomson.

== Byrns ==
- Joseph W. Byrns. Sr. (1869–1936), Tennessee State Representative 1895–1900, Tennessee State Senator 1901, candidate for District Attorney of Davidson County, Tennessee 1902, U.S. Representative from Tennessee 1909–36. Father of Joseph W. Byrns Jr.
  - Joseph W. Byrns Jr. (1903–1973), U.S. Representative from Tennessee 1939–41. Son of Joseph W. Byrns, Sr.

== Byrnes ==
- Brendan Byrne (1924–2018), New Jersey Superior Court Judge 1970–73, Governor of New Jersey 1974–82, delegate to the Democratic National Convention 1980. Father of Brendan T. Byrne Jr.
  - Brendan T. Byrne Jr., Chairman of the New Jersey Democratic Party 1994–97, candidate for Democratic nomination for U.S. Senate from New Jersey 2000. Son of Brendan Byrne.

== Byrnes of South Carolina ==
- James Francis Byrnes, Clerk of Charleston, South Carolina. Father of James F. Byrnes.
  - James F. Byrnes (1882–1972), Solicitor of South Carolina 1908–1910, U.S. Representative from South Carolina 1911–1925, U.S. Senator from South Carolina 1931–1941, delegate to the Democratic National Convention 1936 1940 1952, Justice of the U.S. Supreme Court 1941–1942, U.S. Secretary of State 1945–1947, Governor of South Carolina 1951–1955. Son of James Francis Byrnes.
- Miles Benjamin McSweeney (1855–1909), Member of the South Carolina House of Representatives 1894–1897, Lieutenant Governor of South Carolina 1897–1899, Governor of South Carolina 1899–1903. Cousin of James F. Byrnes.

== Byrons ==
- Louis E. McComas (1846–1907), candidate for U.S. Representative from Maryland 1876, U.S. Representative from Maryland 1883–1891, Justice of the District of Columbia Supreme Court 1892–1899, U.S. Senator from Maryland 1899–1905, Republican National Committeeman 1904, Judge of the District of Columbia Court of Appeals 1905–1907. Grandfather of Katharine Byron.
  - Katharine Byron (1903–1976), U.S. Representative from Maryland 1941–1943. Granddaughter of Louis E. McComas.
  - William D. Byron (1895–1941), Mayor of Williamsport, Maryland 1926–1930; Maryland State Senator 1930–1934; U.S. Representative from Maryland 1939–1941. Husband of Katharine Byron.
    - Goodloe Byron (1929–1978), Maryland House Delegate 1963–1967, Maryland State Senator 1967–1971, U.S. Representative from Maryland 1971–1978. Son of Katharine Byron and William D. Byron.
    - Beverly Byron (born 1932), U.S. Representative from Maryland 1979–1993. Wife of Goodloe Byron.

Note: William D. Byron was also grandson of Williamsport, Maryland Mayor William Byron.
