= Alaska's at-large congressional district =

At-large U.S. House district for Alaska

Coordinates: 64°N 153°W

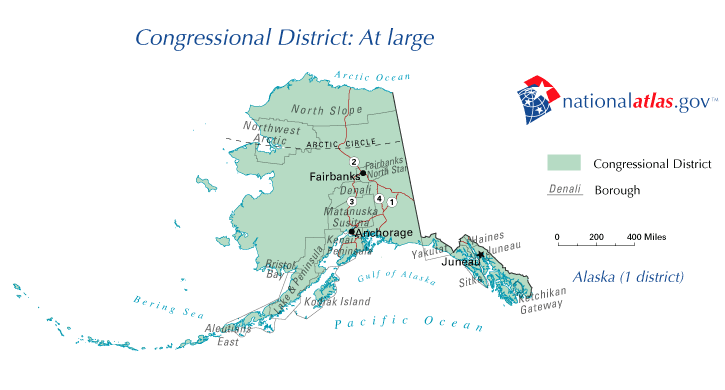
- Representative: Nick Begich III; R–Chugiak
- Area: 665,384.04 mi^{2} (1,723,336.8 km^{2})
- Distribution: 65.7% urban; 34.3% rural
- Population (2025): 737,270
- Median household income: $95,220
- Ethnicity: 57.5% White; 14.8% Native American; 9.8% Two or more races; 6.8% Hispanic; 5.9% Asian; 2.8% Black; 1.7% Pacific Islander Americans; 0.6% other
- Cook PVI: R+6

Since becoming a U.S. state in 1959, Alaska has been entitled to one member in the United States House of Representatives. The representative is elected at-large, because the state has only one congressional district, encompassing its entire territory. By area, Alaska's congressional district is the largest congressional district in the United States and the third-largest electoral district represented by a single member in the world, exceeded only by the Yakutsk district in Russia and Nunavut in Canada.

On August 31, 2022, Democrat Mary Peltola defeated Republican former governor Sarah Palin in the special election to replace Don Young, who died on March 18 of the same year and was the longest serving Republican in the history of the House. Peltola became the first Democrat elected to the House of Representatives from Alaska since 1972, and the first Alaska Native in history to be elected to the United States House of Representatives. Peltola was defeated by Nick Begich III in 2024.

It has a partisan lean of R+6.

== History ==
The district was created when Alaska achieved statehood on January 3, 1959, and having existed uninterrupted ever since. Given the growth of population across the nation, Alaska is still entitled to only one seat in the House of Representatives.

=== Voter registration ===
Voter registration as of January 3, 2021
Party	Total voters	Percentage
Unaffiliated	338,931	56.52%
Republican	149,173	24.87%
Democratic	81,355	13.57%
Alaskan Independence	19,109	3.19%
Minor parties	11,136	1.85%
Total	599,704	100%

== Recent statewide election results ==
Because Alaska has always had only one congressional district, these are the same as the presidential election results for the state.

Year	Office	Results
1960	President	Richard Nixon 51% – John F. Kennedy 49%
1964	President	Lyndon B. Johnson 66% – Barry Goldwater 34%
1968	President	Richard Nixon 45% – Hubert Humphrey 43%
1972	President	Richard Nixon 58% – George McGovern 35%
1976	President	Gerald Ford 58% – Jimmy Carter 36%
1980	President	Ronald Reagan 54% – Jimmy Carter 26%
1984	President	Ronald Reagan 67% – Walter Mondale 30%
1988	President	George H. W. Bush 60% – Michael Dukakis 36%
1992	President	George H. W. Bush 39% – Bill Clinton 30%
1996	President	Bob Dole 51% – Bill Clinton 33%
2000	President	George W. Bush 59% – Al Gore 28%
2004	President	George W. Bush 61% – John Kerry 36%
2008	President	John McCain 59% – Barack Obama 38%
2012	President	Mitt Romney 55% – Barack Obama 41%
2016	President	Donald Trump 51% – Hillary Clinton 37%
2020	President	Donald Trump 53% – Joe Biden 43%
2024	President	Donald Trump 55% – Kamala Harris 41%

== List of members representing the district ==
Representative (Residence)	Party	Term	Cong ress	Electoral history
District created January 3, 1959
Ralph Rivers (Fairbanks)	Democratic	January 3, 1959 – December 30, 1966	86th 87th 88th 89th	Elected in 1958. Re-elected in 1960. Re-elected in 1962. Re-elected in 1964. Lost re-election, then resigned early.
Vacant		December 30, 1966 – January 3, 1967	89th	
Howard Pollock (Anchorage)	Republican	January 3, 1967 – January 3, 1971	90th 91st	Elected in 1966. Re-elected in 1968. Retired to run for Governor of Alaska.
Nick Begich Sr. (Anchorage)	Democratic	January 3, 1971 – December 29, 1972	92nd	Elected in 1970. Went missing October 16, 1972. Re-elected posthumously in 1972. Declared dead December 29, 1972.
Vacant		December 29, 1972 – March 6, 1973	92nd 93rd	
Don Young (Fort Yukon)	Republican	March 6, 1973 – March 18, 2022	93rd 94th 95th 96th 97th 98th 99th 100th 101st 102nd 103rd 104th 105th 106th 107th 108th 109th 110th 111th 112th 113th 114th 115th 116th 117th	Elected to finish Begich's term. Re-elected in 1974. Re-elected in 1976. Re-elected in 1978. Re-elected in 1980. Re-elected in 1982. Re-elected in 1984. Re-elected in 1986. Re-elected in 1988. Re-elected in 1990. Re-elected in 1992. Re-elected in 1994. Re-elected in 1996. Re-elected in 1998. Re-elected in 2000. Re-elected in 2002. Re-elected in 2004. Re-elected in 2006. Re-elected in 2008. Re-elected in 2010. Re-elected in 2012. Re-elected in 2014. Re-elected in 2016. Re-elected in 2018. Re-elected in 2020. Died.
Vacant		March 18, 2022 – September 13, 2022	117th	
Mary Peltola (Bethel)	Democratic	September 13, 2022 – January 3, 2025	117th 118th	Elected to finish Young's term. Re-elected in 2022. Lost re-election.
Nick Begich III (Chugiak)	Republican	January 3, 2025 – present	119th	Elected in 2024. Re-elected in 2026.

== Electoral history ==
=== 1958 to 2010 ===
Year	Republican			Democratic			Green			Libertarian			Others			Write-in	
Year	Candidate	Votes	Pct	Candidate	Votes	Pct	Candidate	Votes	Pct	Candidate	Votes	Pct	Candidate	Votes	Pct	Votes	Pct
1958	Henry A. Benson	20,699	42.5%	Ralph Rivers	27,948	57.5%											
1960	R. L. Rettig	25,517	43.2%	Ralph Rivers (incumbent)	33,546	56.8%											
1962	Lowell Thomas Jr.	26,638	44%	Ralph Rivers (incumbent)	33,953	56%											
1964	Lowell Thomas Jr.	32,556	48.5%	Ralph Rivers (incumbent)	34,590	51.5%											
1966	Howard W. Pollock	34,040	51.6%	Ralph Rivers (incumbent)	31,867	48.4%											
1968	Howard W. Pollock (incumbent)	43,577	54.2%	Nick Begich	36,785	45.8%											
1970	Frank Murkowski	35,947	44.9%	Nick Begich	44,137	55.1%											
1972	Don Young	41,750	43.8%	Nick Begich (incumbent)	53,651	56.2%											
1973	Don Young	35,044	51.4%	Emil Notti	33,123	48.6%											
1974	Don Young (incumbent)	51,641	53.8%	William L. Hensley	44,280	46.2%											
1976	Don Young (incumbent)	83,722	70.8%	Eben Hopson	34,194	28.9%										292	0.2%
1978	Don Young (incumbent)	68,811	55.4%	Patrick Rodey	55,176	44.4%										200	0.2%
1980	Don Young (incumbent)	114,089	73.8%	Kevin Parnell	39,922	25.8%										607	0.4%
1982	Don Young (incumbent)	128,274	70.8%	Dave Carlson	52,011	28.7%										799	0.4%
1984	Don Young (incumbent)	113,582	55%	Pegge Begich	86,052	41.7%							Betty Breck (I)	6,508	3.2%	295	0.1%
1986	Don Young (incumbent)	101,799	56.5%	Pegge Begich	74,053	41.1%				Betty Breck	4,182	2.3%				243	0.1%
1988	Don Young (incumbent)	120,595	62.5%	Peter Gruenstein	71,881	37.3%										479	0.2%
1990	Don Young (incumbent)	99,003	51.7%	John S. Devens	91,677	47.8%										967	0.5%
1992	Don Young (incumbent)	111,849	46.8%	John S. Devens	102,378	42.8%	Mike Milligan	9,529	4%				Michael States (AI)	15,049	6.3%	311	0.1%
1994	Don Young (incumbent)	118,537	56.9%	Tony Smith	68,172	32.7%	Joni Whitmore	21,277	10.2%							254	0.1%
1996	Don Young (incumbent)	138,834	59.4%	Georgianna Lincoln	85,114	36.4%	John J. G. Grames	4,513	1.9%				William J. Nemec II (AI)	5,017	2.1%	222	0.1%
1998	Don Young (incumbent)	139,676	62.6%	Jim Duncan	77,232	34.6%	John J. G. Grames	5,923	2.7%							469	0.2%
2000	Don Young (incumbent)	190,862	69.6%	Clifford Mark Greene	45,372	16.5%	Anna C. Young	22,440	8.2%	Leonard J. Karpinski	4,802	1.8%	Jim Dore (AI)	10,085	3.7%	832	0.3%
2002	Don Young (incumbent)	169,685	74.5%	Clifford Mark Greene	39,357	17.3%	Russell deForest	14,435	6.3%	Rob Clift	3,797	1.7%				291	0.1%
2004	Don Young (incumbent)	213,216	71.1%	Thomas M. Higgins	67,074	22.4%	Timothy A. Feller	11,434	3.8%	Alvin A. Anders	7,157	2.4%				1,115	0.4%
2006	Don Young (incumbent)	132,743	56.6%	Diane E. Benson	93,879	40%	Eva Ince	1,819	0.8%	Alexander Crawford	4,029	1.7%	William Ratigan	1,615	0.7%	560	0.2%
2008	Don Young (incumbent)	158,939	50.1%	Ethan Berkowitz	142,560	45%							Don Wright	14,274	4.5%	1,205	0.4%
2010	Don Young (incumbent)	175,384	69%	Harry Crawford	77,606	30.5%										1,345	0.5%
Year	Republican			Democratic			Green			Libertarian			Others			Write-in	

Source: "Election Statistics". Office of the Clerk of the House of Representatives. Archived from the original on July 30, 2008.

=== 2012 ===
2012 United States House of Representatives election in Alaska
Party	Candidate	Votes	%	±%
Republican	Don Young (incumbent)	185,296	63.94	−5.02
Democratic	Sharon Cissna	82,927	28.62	−1.89
Libertarian	Jim McDermott	15,028	5.19	+5.19
Independent	Ted Gianoutsos	5,589	1.93	+1.93
Independent	Write-in votes	964	0.33	−0.20
Republican hold		Swing		
Turnout		289,804		

=== 2014 ===
2014 United States House of Representatives election in Alaska
Party	Candidate	Votes	%	±%
Republican	Don Young (incumbent)	142,260	50.95	−12.99
Democratic	Forrest Dunbar	114,317	40.94	+12.32
Libertarian	Jim McDermott	21,373	7.65	+2.46
Independent	Write-in votes	1,269	0.45	+0.12
Republican hold		Swing		
Turnout		279,219		

=== 2016 ===
2016 United States House of Representatives election in Alaska
Party	Candidate	Votes	%	±%
Republican	Don Young (incumbent)	155,088	50.32	−0.63
Democratic	Steve Lindbeck	111,019	36.02	−4.92
Libertarian	Jim McDermott	31,770	10.31	+2.66
Independent	Bernie Souphanavong	9,093	2.95	+2.95
Independent	Write-in votes	1,228	0.40	−0.05
Republican hold		Swing		
Turnout		308,198		

=== 2018 ===
2018 United States House of Representatives election in Alaska
Party	Candidate	Votes	%	±%
Republican	Don Young (incumbent)	149,779	53.08	+2.76%
Independent	Alyse S. Galvin (Note: Also listed as having the Democratic nomination.)	131,199	46.50	+10.48%
Write-in		1,188	0.42	+0.02%
Total votes		282,166	100	N/A

=== 2020 ===
2020 United States House of Representatives election in Alaska
Party	Candidate	Votes	%	±%
Republican	Don Young (incumbent)	192,126	54.40	+1.32%
Independent	Alyse S. Galvin	159,856	45.26	−1.24%
Write-in		1,183	0.34	−0.08%
Total votes		353,165	100	N/A

=== 2022 special ===
2022 Alaska's at-large congressional district special election
Party	Candidate	First choice			Round 1			Round 2	
Party	Candidate	Votes	%	Transfer	Votes	%	Transfer	Votes	%
Democratic	Mary Peltola	74,817	39.66%	+982	75,799	40.19%	+15,467	91,266	51.48%
Republican	Sarah Palin	58,339	30.92%	+634	58,973	31.27%	+27,053	86,026	48.52%
Republican	Nick Begich III	52,536	27.84%	+1,274	53,810	28.53%	-53,810	Eliminated	
Write-in		2,974	1.58%	-2,974	Eliminated				
Total votes		188,666			188,582			177,292	
Blank or inactive ballots					3,707		+11,290	14,997	
Democratic gain from Republican									

=== 2022 ===
2022 Alaska's at-large congressional district election
Party	Candidate	First choice			Round 1			Round 2			Round 3	
Party	Candidate	Votes	%	Transfer	Votes	%	Transfer	Votes	%	Transfer	Votes	%
Democratic	Mary Peltola (incumbent)	128,553	48.77%	+202	128,755	48.66%	+1,031	129,786	49.22%	+7,477	137,263	54.96%
Republican	Sarah Palin	67,866	25.74%	+464	68,330	25.82%	+1,069	69,399	26.32%	+43,072	112,471	45.04%
Republican	Nick Begich III	61,513	23.33%	+992	62,505	23.62%	+1,994	64,499	24.46%	-64,499	Eliminated	
Libertarian	Chris Bye	4,570	1.73%	+429	4,999	1.89%	-4,999	Eliminated				
Write-in		1,108	0.42%	-1,108	Eliminated							
Total votes		263,610			264,589			263,684			249,734	
Blank or inactive ballots					2,208		+905	3,113		+13,950	17,063	
Democratic hold												

=== 2024 ===
2024 Alaska's at-large congressional district election
Party	Candidate	First choice		Round 1			Round 2			Round 3	
Party	Candidate	Votes	%	Votes	%	Transfer	Votes	%	Transfer	Votes	%
Republican	Nick Begich III	159,550	48.41%	159,777	48.49%	+267	160,044	48.77%	+4,817	164,861	51.22%
Democratic	Mary Peltola (incumbent)	152,828	46.37%	152,948	46.42%	+1,313	154,261	47.01%	+2,724	156,985	48.78%
Independence	John Wayne Howe	13,010	3.95%	13,210	4.01%	+661	13,871	4.23%	−13,871	Eliminated	
Democratic	Eric Hafner	3,417	1.04%	3,558	1.08%	−3,558	Eliminated				
Write-in		750	0.23%	Eliminated							
Total votes		329,555		329,493			328,176			321,846	
Inactive ballots (Note: Includes overvotes, undervotes, and exhausted ballots where another candidate was not ranked.)				6,360		+1,317	7,677		+6,330	14,007	
Republican gain from Democratic											
