= 1970 United States House of Representatives election in Alaska =

- November 3, 1970
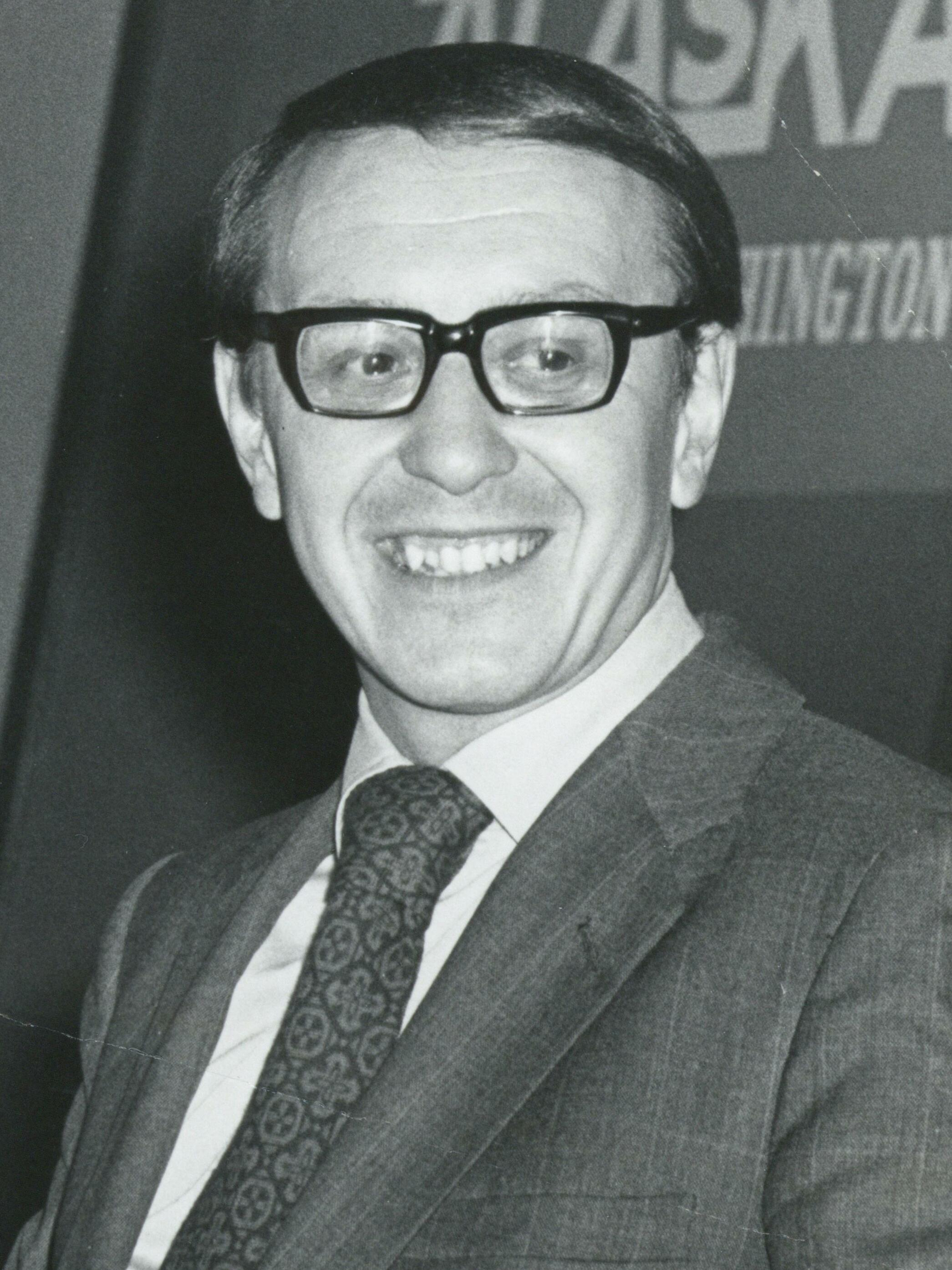

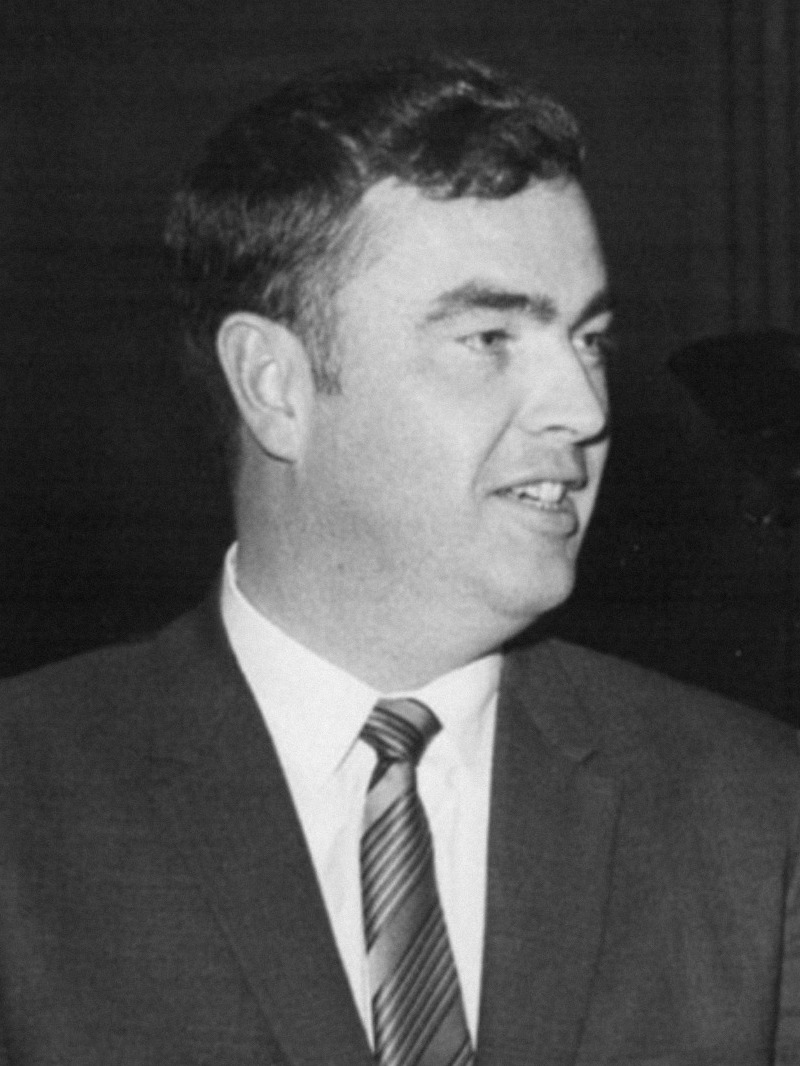
| Nominee | Nick Begich Sr. | Frank Murkowski |
| Party | Democratic | Republican |
| Popular vote | 44,137 | 35,947 |
| Percentage | 55.1% | 44.9% |
- Results by state house district Begich: 50–60% 60–70% 70–80% 80–90% Murkowski: 50–60%
Representative at-large before election
Howard Pollock
Republican
Elected Representative at-large
Nick Begich
Democratic

The Alaska congressional election of 1970 was held on Tuesday, November 3, 1970. The term of the state's sole Representative to the United States House of Representatives expired on January 3, 1971. Incumbent Howard Wallace Pollock retired to run for Governor of Alaska. The winning candidate would serve a two-year term from January 3, 1971, to January 3, 1973. Nick Begich defeated former Alaska Commissioner of Economic Development & Anchorage banker Frank Murkowski, by a margin of 10.2%.

Begich would go missing on October 16, 1972, posthumously win the 1972 election, be declared dead on December 29, 1972, and be succeeded by Don Young, who won the 1973 special election. Young would hold the seat for 49 years, until his death in 2022. Murkowski would be elected U.S. Senator in the 1980 Senate election, and later become Governor for one term in the 2002 gubernatorial election.

== Campaign ==
Begich, now more experienced following his 1968 campaign, had maintained many files from the prior campaign, knowing full well how to campaign amongst the vast, sparsely populated state. Murkowski, a banker with little to no political experience, relied instead on his economic experience, being a 28-year Alaska resident & senior banker, notably serving as Alaska Commissioner of Economic Development under Governor Walter Hickel, as well as tying himself to the policies of popular freshman U.S. Senator Ted Stevens & President Richard Nixon. Begich used simple but effective campaign slogans such as "You must be able to trust your Congressman" and "A true representative of all the people", as well as relying on his voting record in the State Senate. Murkowski countered by campaigning on legislation to raise military pay as to provide more incentive to serve, as well as an all-volunteer military.

Republicans were much more successful in raising campaign funding, but Democrats brought more people, as was shown when the Republicans sold 100 $10 tickets to a Fairbanks rally where U.S. Senator John Tower spoke, just for Democrats to draw a crowd of 500, admission free, to a rally at Alaskaland. Due to Begich's support for the Alaska Federation of Natives' views on Alaska land claims disputes, a high issue since statehood, Begich performed very well amongst native voters and the 'Bush' regions of Alaska, especially due to the Republican tickets' failure to adequately address economic concerns, something key for the economically depressed natives.

== General election ==
=== Results ===
1970 Alaska at-large congressional district election
| Party | Candidate | Votes | % | ±% |
|---|---|---|---|---|
| Democratic | Nick Begich | 44,137 | 55.1% | +9.3% |
| Republican | Frank Murkowski | 35,947 | 44.9% | −9.3% |
| Total votes | | 80,084 | 100.00% | |
