= 1966 United States House of Representatives election in Alaska =

- November 8, 1966
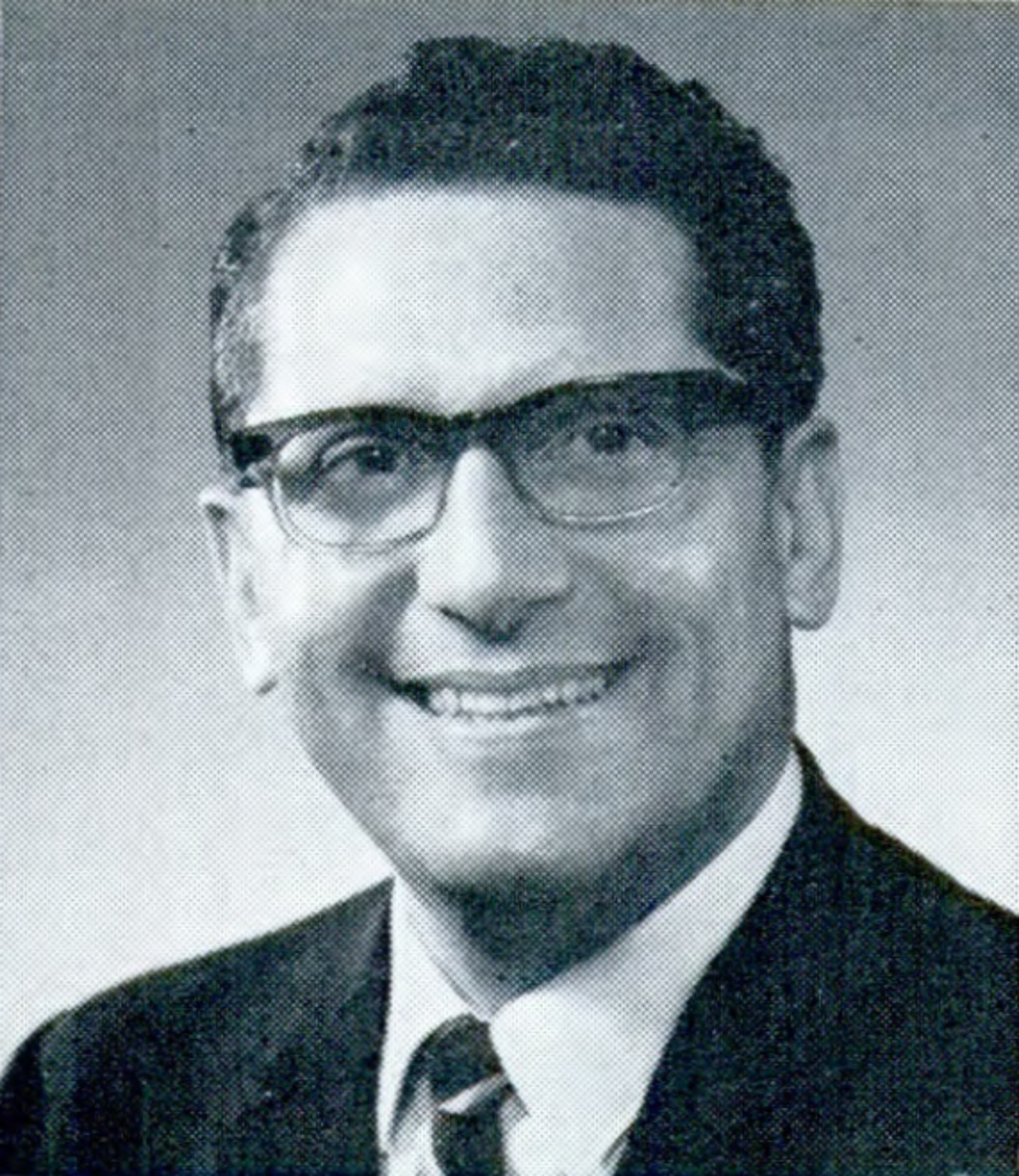

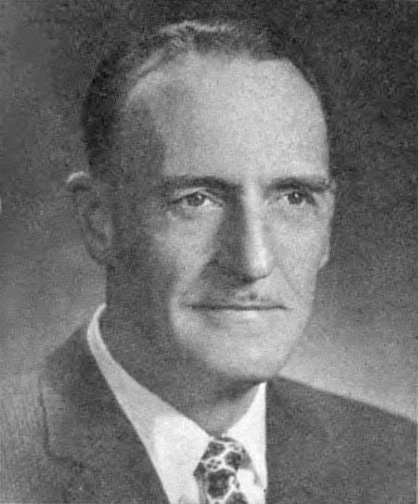
Nominee	Howard Wallace Pollock	Ralph Rivers
Party	Republican	Democratic
Popular vote	34,040	31,867
Percentage	51.6%	48.4%
- Results by state house district Pollock: 50–60% 60–70% Rivers: 50–60% 60–70% 70–80%
Representative at-large before election
Ralph Rivers
Democratic
Elected Representative at-large
Howard Wallace Pollock
Republican

The Alaska congressional election of 1966 was held on Tuesday, November 8, 1966. The term of the state's sole Representative to the United States House of Representatives expired on January 3, 1967. The winning candidate would serve a two-year term from January 3, 1967, to January 3, 1969. Incumbent representative Ralph Rivers lost re-election to a fifth term by a margin of 3.2%.

== General election ==
=== Results ===
1968 Alaska's at-large congressional district election
Party	Candidate	Votes	%
Republican	Howard Wallace Pollock	34,040	51.6
Democratic	Ralph Rivers (inc.)	31,867	48.4
Total votes		65,907	100.00
Republican gain from Democratic			

== See also ==
- 1966 United States Senate election in Alaska
