= 1984 United States House of Representatives election in Alaska =

- November 6, 1984
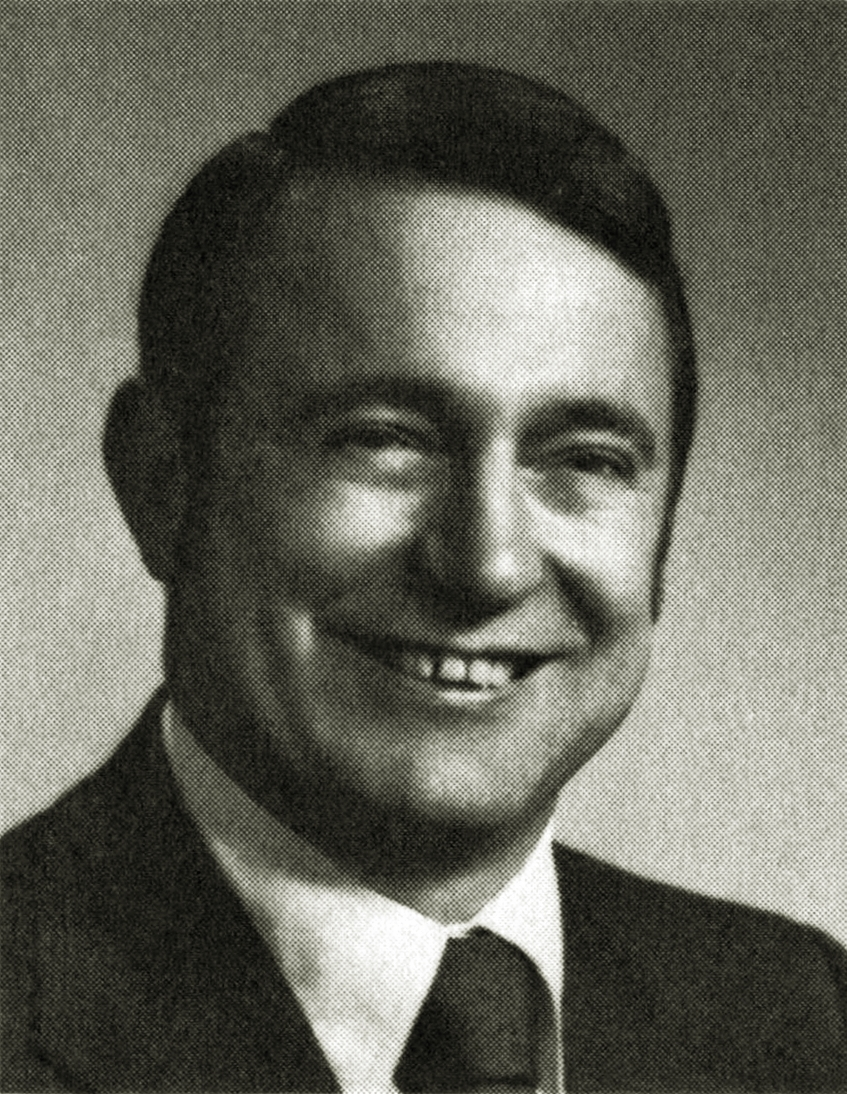

Nominee	Don Young	Pegge Begich
Party	Republican	Democratic
Popular vote	113,582	86,052
Percentage	55.0%	41.7%
- Results by state house district Young: 40–50% 50–60% 60–70% 70–80% Begich: 50–60%
Representative at-large before election
Don Young
Republican
Elected Representative at-large
Don Young
Republican

The Alaska congressional election of 1984 was held on Tuesday, November 6, 1984. The term of the state's sole Representative to the United States House of Representatives expired on January 3, 1985. The winning candidate would serve a two-year term from January 3, 1985, to January 3, 1987.

Incumbent Republican Representative Don Young won re-election by a wide margin of 13.3 percentage points. The Democratic challenger was Pegge Begich, widow of former Democratic Representative Nick Begich Sr., whom Young had previously succeeded in a 1973 special election.

This election coincided with Republican President Ronald Reagan's nationwide landslide in the concurrent presidential election against Democrat Walter Mondale. Despite her loss, Begich massively overperformed Mondale in Alaska, as Reagan carried the state by nearly 37 percentage points.

== General election ==
=== Results ===
1984 Alaska's at-large congressional district election
Party	Candidate	Votes	%
Republican	Don Young (inc.)	113,582	55.02
Democratic	Pegge Begich	86,052	41.68
Independent	Betty Breck	6,508	3.15
Write-in		295	0.14
Total votes		206,437	100.00
Republican hold			
