= Joseph Begich =

American politician (1930–2019)

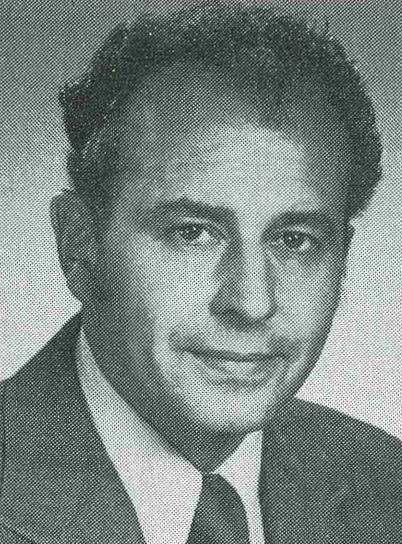
- Official portrait, 1977

Member of the Minnesota House of Representatives
- In office January 6, 1975 – January 6, 1993

Personal details
- Born: Joseph Richard Begich; January 17, 1930 Eveleth, Minnesota, U.S.
- Died: August 10, 2019 (aged 89) Eveleth, Minnesota, U.S.
- Party: Democratic (DFL)
- Relations: Nick Begich Sr. (brother); Mark Begich (nephew); Nick Begich III (great-nephew)
- Occupation: management, mining, farming

Joseph Richard Begich (January 17, 1930 – August 10, 2019) was an American politician in the state of Minnesota. He was born in Eveleth, Minnesota. He was an alumnus of the Northwest School of Agriculture and was a grain and livestock farmer. Begich served in the United States Army. He served as mayor of Eveleth, Minnesota, from 1965 to 1974, when he was elected to the Minnesota Legislature. He served in the Minnesota House of Representatives for District 6A from 1975 to 1982 and for District 6B from 1983 to 1992. He was also a member of the Eveleth Hospital Board. Begich died at a nursing home in Eveleth in 2019 at the age of 89.

== Family ==
Begich was married to Carolyn and had one daughter. He was the brother of United States Congressman from Alaska Nick Begich, who disappeared and was presumed dead in 1972 while riding a plane, the uncle of former United States Senator from Alaska Mark Begich, and the great-uncle of the current United States Congressman from Alaska Nick Begich III.

== Honours ==
- A section of Minnesota State Highway 101 was renamed the "Representative Joe Begich Highway" in 2017.
