= 1964 United States House of Representatives election in Alaska =

- November 3, 1964
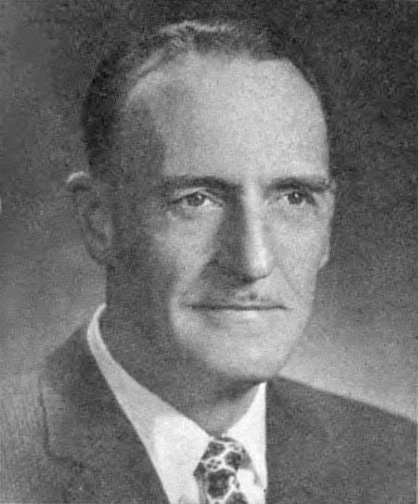

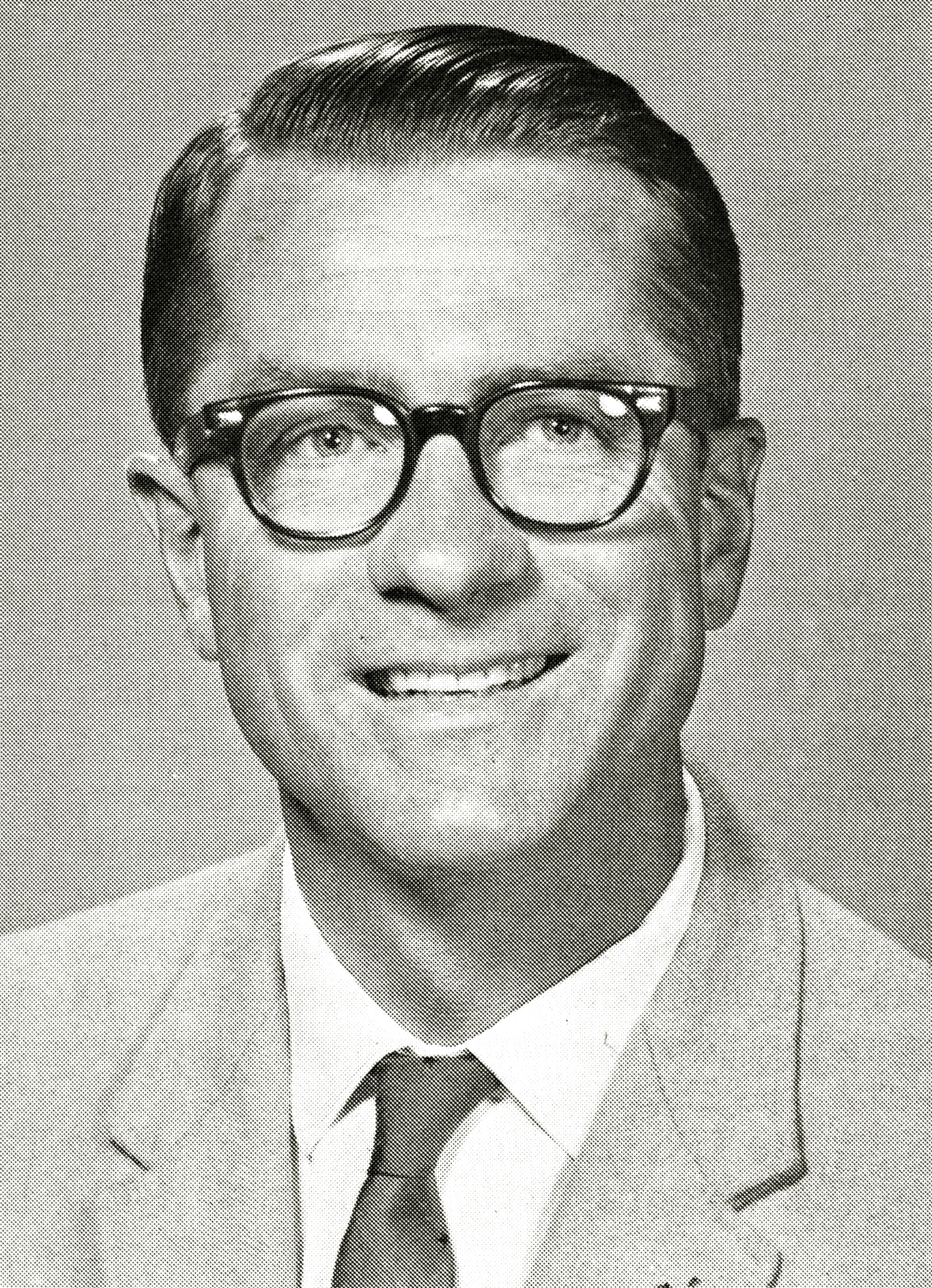
Nominee	Ralph Rivers	Lowell Thomas Jr.
Party	Democratic	Republican
Popular vote	34,590	32,556
Percentage	51.51%	48.49%
- Results by state house district Rivers: 50–60% 60–70% 70–80% 80–90% Thomas: 50–60%
Representative at-large before election
Ralph Rivers
Democratic
Elected Representative at-large
Ralph Rivers
Democratic

The Alaska congressional election of 1964 was held on Tuesday, November 3, 1964. The term of the state's sole Representative to the United States House of Representatives expired on January 3, 1965. The winning candidate would serve a two-year term from January 3, 1965, to January 3, 1967. Incumbent representative Ralph Rivers won re-election to a fourth term by 3 percentage points. He greatly under-performed fellow Democrat, Lyndon B. Johnson in the concurrent presidential election by 28.8 percentage points.

== General election ==
=== Results ===
1964 Alaska's at-large congressional district election
Party	Candidate	Votes	%
Democratic	Ralph Rivers (inc.)	34,590	51.51
Republican	Lowell Thomas Jr.	32,556	48.49
Total votes		67,146	100.00
Democratic hold			

== See also ==
- 1964 United States presidential election in Alaska
