= 1968 United States House of Representatives election in Alaska =

- November 5, 1968
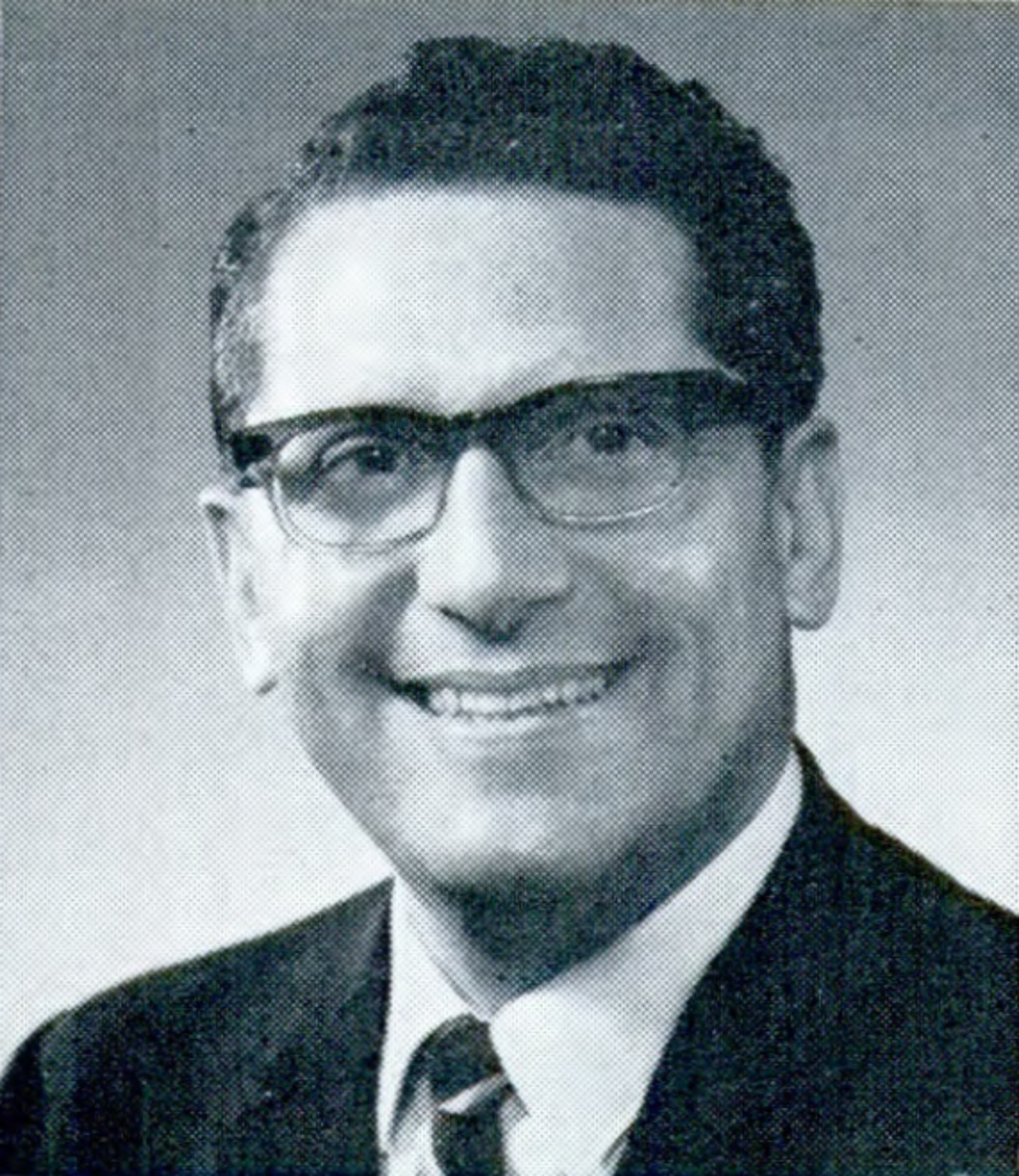

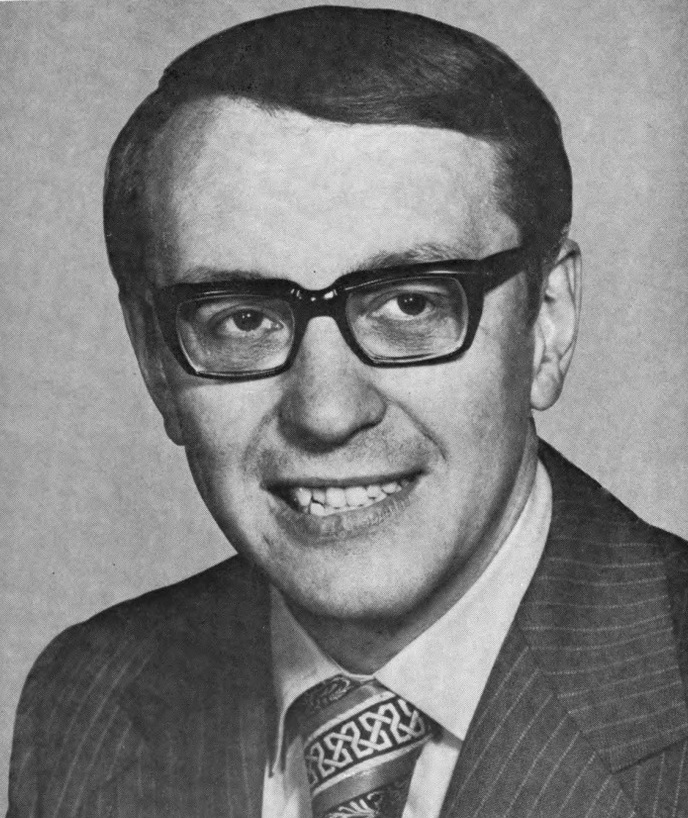
Nominee	Howard Wallace Pollock	Nick Begich
Party	Republican	Democratic
Popular vote	43,577	36,785
Percentage	54.2%	45.8%
- Results by state house district Pollock: 50–60% 60–70% Begich: 50–60% 60–70%
Representative at-large before election
Howard Wallace Pollock
Republican
Elected Representative at-large
Howard Wallace Pollock
Republican

The Alaska congressional election of 1968 was held on Tuesday, November 5, 1968. The term of the state's sole Representative to the United States House of Representatives expired on January 3, 1969. The winning candidate would serve a two-year term from January 3, 1969, to January 3, 1971. Incumbent Republican Representative Howard W. Pollock defeated Democratic State Senator Nick Begich, by a margin of 8.4%, winning re-election to a second term.

== General election ==
=== Results ===
1968 Alaska's at-large congressional district election
Party	Candidate	Votes	%
Republican	Howard Wallace Pollock (inc.)	43,577	54.2
Democratic	Nick Begich	36,785	45.8
Total votes		80,362	100.00
Republican hold			

== See also ==
- 1968 United States Senate election in Alaska
