= 1980 United States House of Representatives election in Alaska =

- November 4, 1980
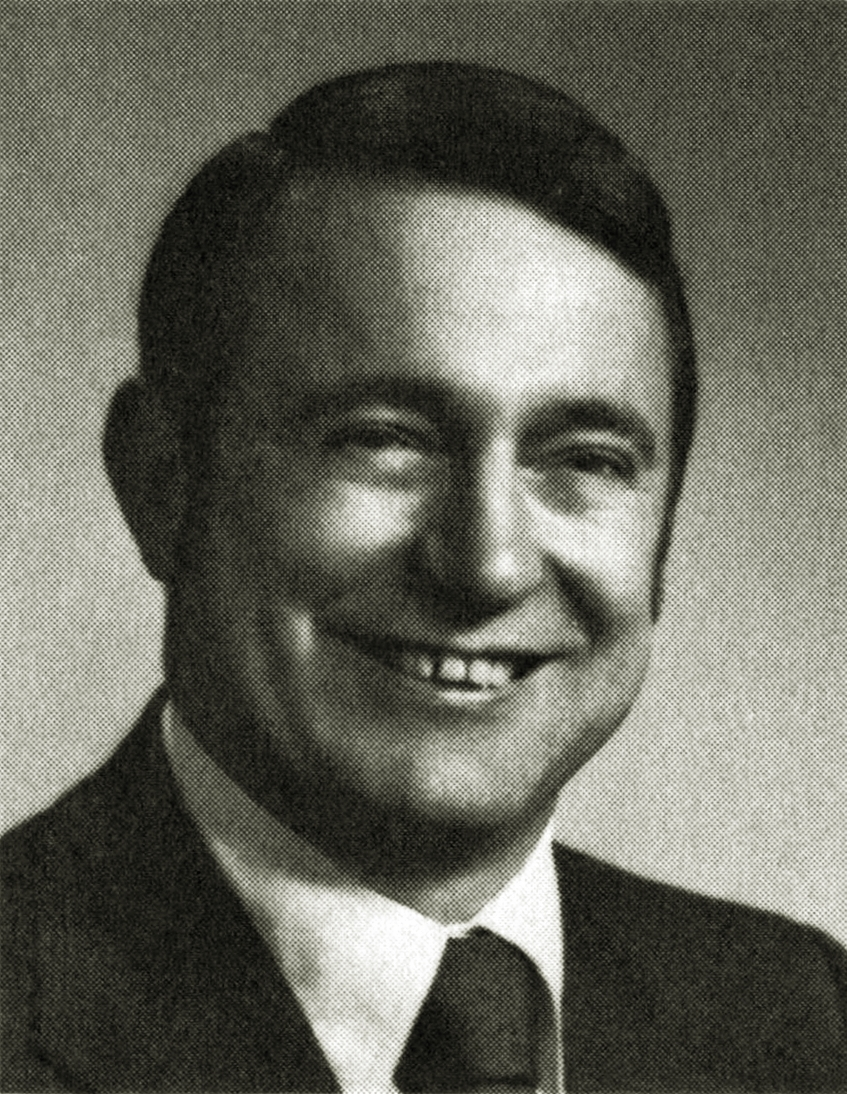

Nominee	Don Young	Kevin Parnell
Party	Republican	Democratic
Popular vote	114,089	39,922
Percentage	73.8%	25.8%
- Results by state house district Young: 60–70% 70–80%
Representative at-large before election
Don Young
Republican
Elected Representative at-large
Don Young
Republican

The Alaska congressional election of 1980 was held on Tuesday, November 4, 1980. The term of the state's sole representative to the United States House of Representatives expired on January 3, 1981. The winning candidate would serve a two-year term from January 3, 1981, to January 3, 1983.

== General election ==
=== Results ===
1980 Alaska's at-large congressional district election
Party	Candidate	Votes	%
Republican	Don Young (inc.)	114,089	73.79
Democratic	Kevin Parnell	39,922	25.82
Write-in		607	0.39
Total votes		154,618	100.00
Republican hold			
