= 1978 United States House of Representatives election in Alaska =

- November 7, 1978
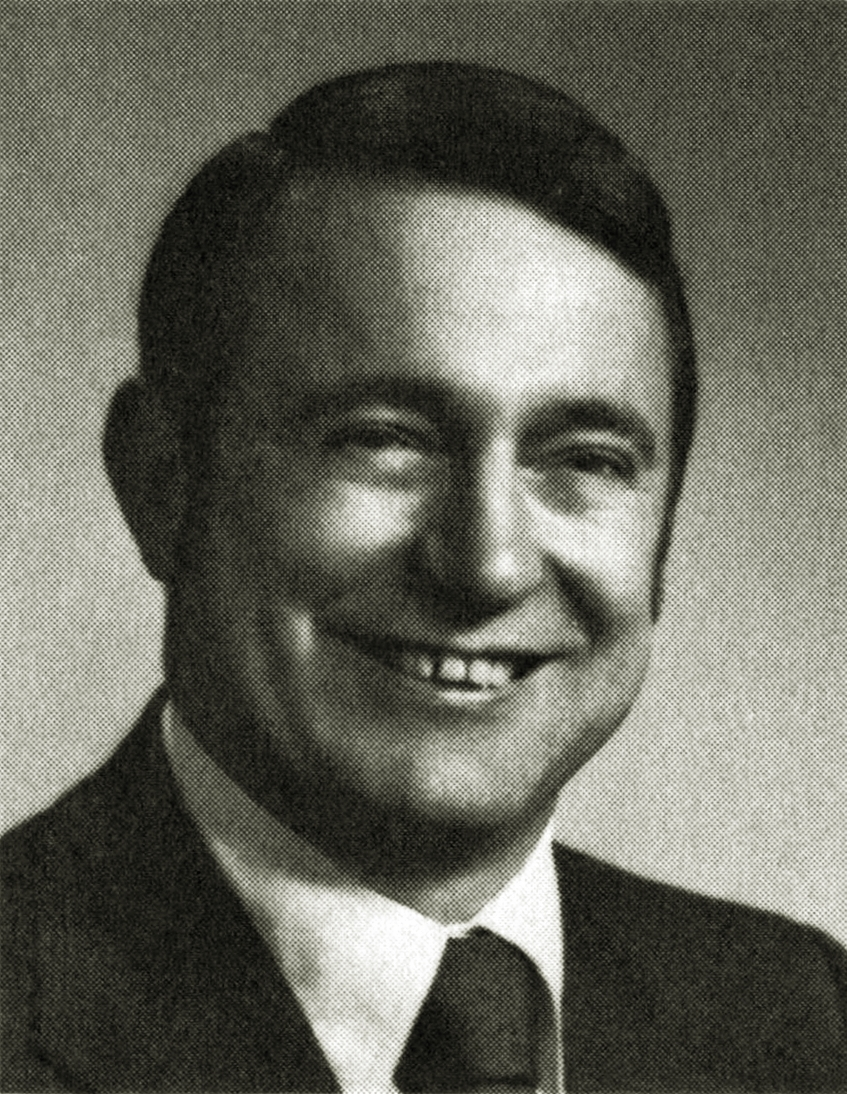

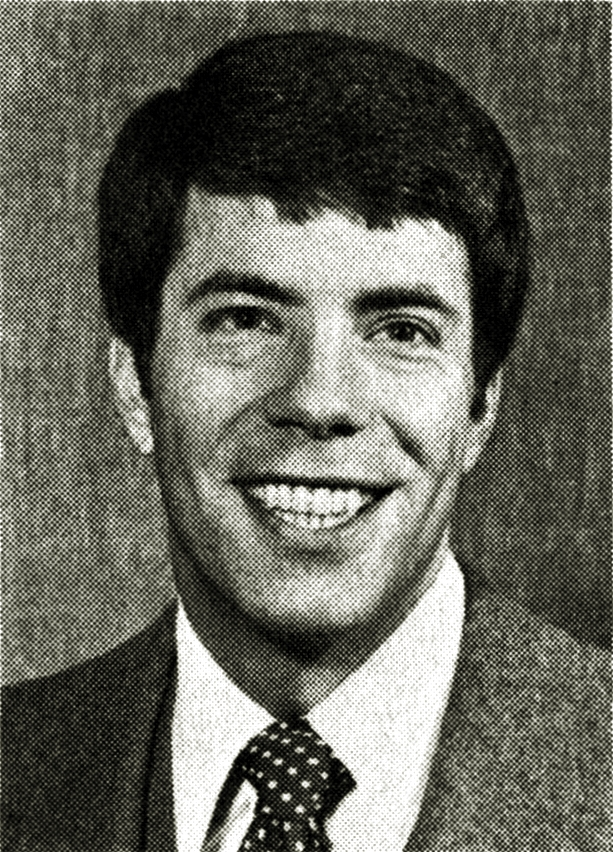
Nominee	Don Young	Patrick Rodey
Party	Republican	Democratic
Popular vote	68,811	55,176
Percentage	55.4%	44.4%
- Results by state house district Young: 50–60% 60–70% Rodey: 50–60%
Representative at-large before election
Don Young
Republican
Elected Representative at-large
Don Young
Republican

The Alaska congressional election of 1978 was held on Tuesday, November 7, 1978. The term of the state's sole Representative to the United States House of Representatives expired on January 3, 1979. The winning candidate would serve a two-year term from January 3, 1979, to January 3, 1981.

== General election ==
1978 Alaska's at-large congressional district election
Party	Candidate	Votes	%
Republican	Don Young (incumbent)	68,811	55.41
Democratic	Patrick Rodey	55,176	44.43
Write-in		200	0.16
Total votes		124,187	100.00
Republican hold			
