= 1994 United States House of Representatives election in Alaska =

- November 8, 1994
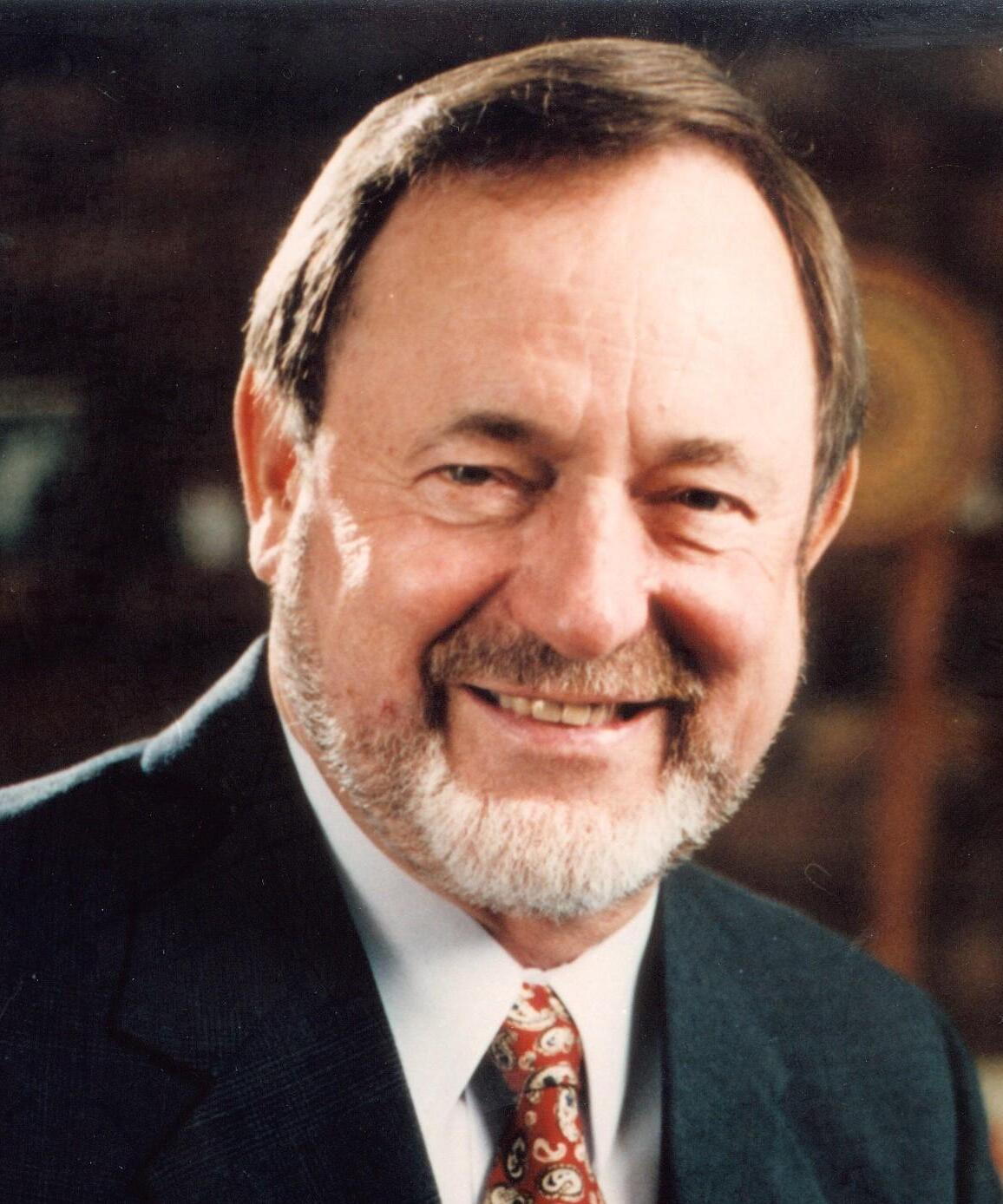

Nominee	Don Young	Tony Smith	Joni Whitmore
Party	Republican	Democratic	Green
Popular vote	118,537	68,172	21,277
Percentage	56.92%	32.74%	10.22%
- Results by state house district Young: 40–50% 50–60% 60–70% Smith: 40–50%
Representative at-large before election
Don Young
Republican
Elected Representative at-large
Don Young
Republican

The Alaska Congressional election of 1994 was held on Tuesday, November 8, 1994. The term of the state's sole representative to the United States House of Representatives expired on January 3, 1995. The winning candidate would serve a two-year term from January 3, 1995, to January 3, 1997.

== General election ==
=== Results ===
1994 Alaska's at-large congressional district election
Party	Candidate	Votes	%
Republican	Don Young (inc.)	118,537	56.92
Democratic	Tony Smith	68,172	32.74
Green	Joni Whitmore	21,277	10.22
Write-in		254	0.12
Total votes		208,240	100.00
Republican hold			
