= 1982 United States House of Representatives election in Alaska =

- November 2, 1982
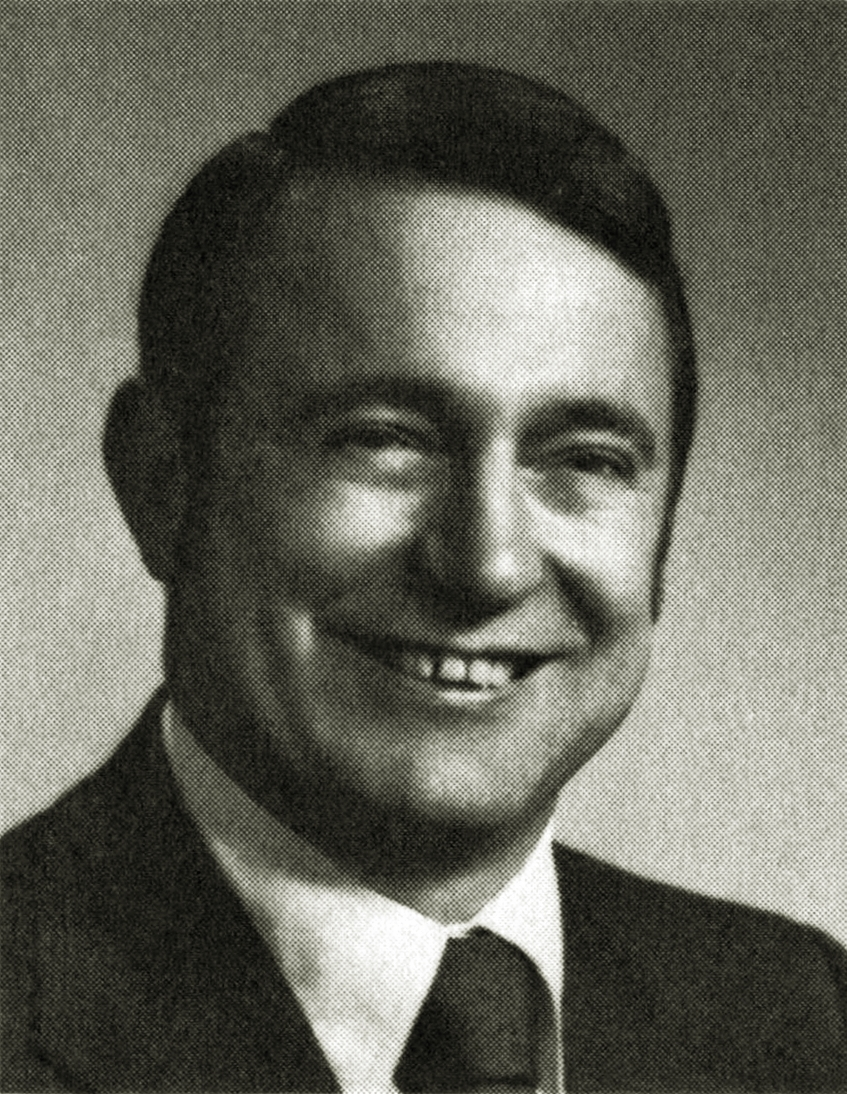

Nominee	Don Young	Dave Carlson
Party	Republican	Democratic
Popular vote	128,274	52,011
Percentage	70.8%	28.7%
- Results by state house district Young: 60–70% 70–80% 80–90%
Representative at-large before election
Don Young
Republican
Elected Representative at-large
Don Young
Republican

The Alaska congressional election of 1982 was held on Tuesday, November 2, 1982. The term of the state's sole Representative to the United States House of Representatives expired on January 3, 1983. The winning candidate would serve a two-year term from January 3, 1983, to January 3, 1985.

== General election ==
=== Results ===
1982 Alaska's at-large congressional district election
Party	Candidate	Votes	%
Republican	Don Young (inc.)	128,274	70.84
Democratic	Dave Carlson	52,011	28.72
Write-in		799	0.44
Total votes		181,084	100.00
Republican hold			
