= 2000 United States House of Representatives election in Alaska =

- November 7, 2000
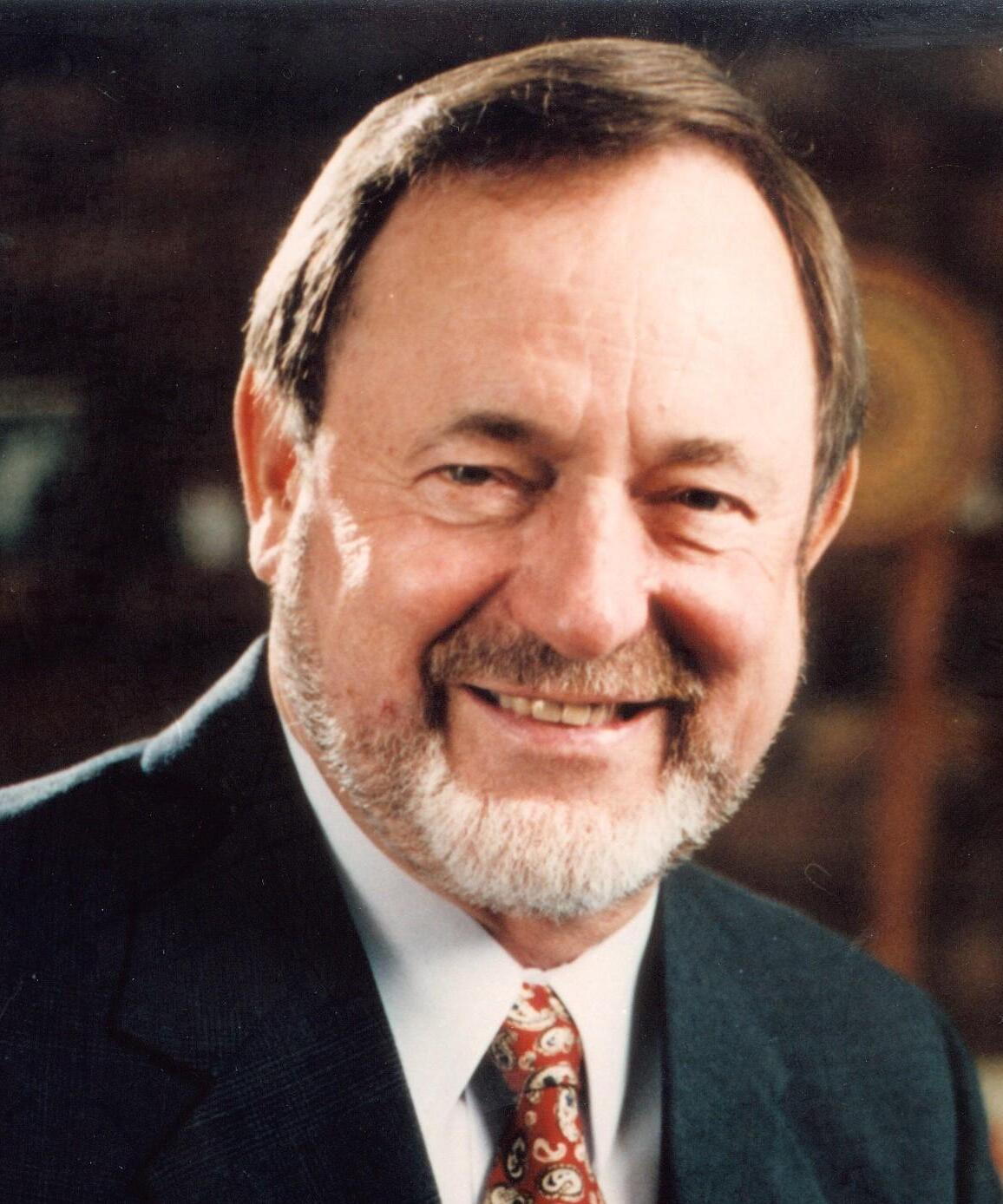

Nominee	Don Young	Clifford Greene	Anna Young
Party	Republican	Democratic	Green
Popular vote	190,862	45,372	22,440
Percentage	69.6%	16.5%	8.2%
- Young: 40–50% 50–60% 60–70% 70–80% 80–90%
Representative at-large before election
Don Young
Republican
Elected Representative at-large
Don Young
Republican

The Alaska congressional election of 2000 was held on Tuesday, November 7, 2000. The term of the state's sole Representative to the United States House of Representatives expired on January 3, 2001. The winning candidate would serve a two-year term from January 3, 2001, to January 3, 2003. Alaska allows the political party to select the person who can appear for party primary. They are submitting a written notice with a copy of their cleared by-laws to the Director of Elections no later than September 1 of the year prior to the year in which a primary election is to be held.

Based on political party by-laws there are three ballots choices:

Alaska Democratic Party, Alaska Libertarian Party and Alaskan Independence party candidate with ballot measures—any registered voter can vote in this ballot

Alaska Republican Party candidate with ballot measures ballot—voters registered republican

Nonpartisan or Undeclared may vote this ballot and the ballot measures on the ballot—any registered voter may vote this ballot

== General election ==
=== Results ===
2000 Alaska's at-large congressional district election
Party	Candidate	Votes	%
Republican	Don Young (inc.)	190,862	69.56
Democratic	Clifford Greene	45,372	16.54
Green	Anna Young	22,440	8.18
Independence	Jim Dore	10,085	3.68
Libertarian	Len Karpinski	4,802	1.75
Write-in		832	0.30
Total votes		274,393	100.00
Republican hold			
