= 2002 United States House of Representatives election in Alaska =

- November 5, 2002
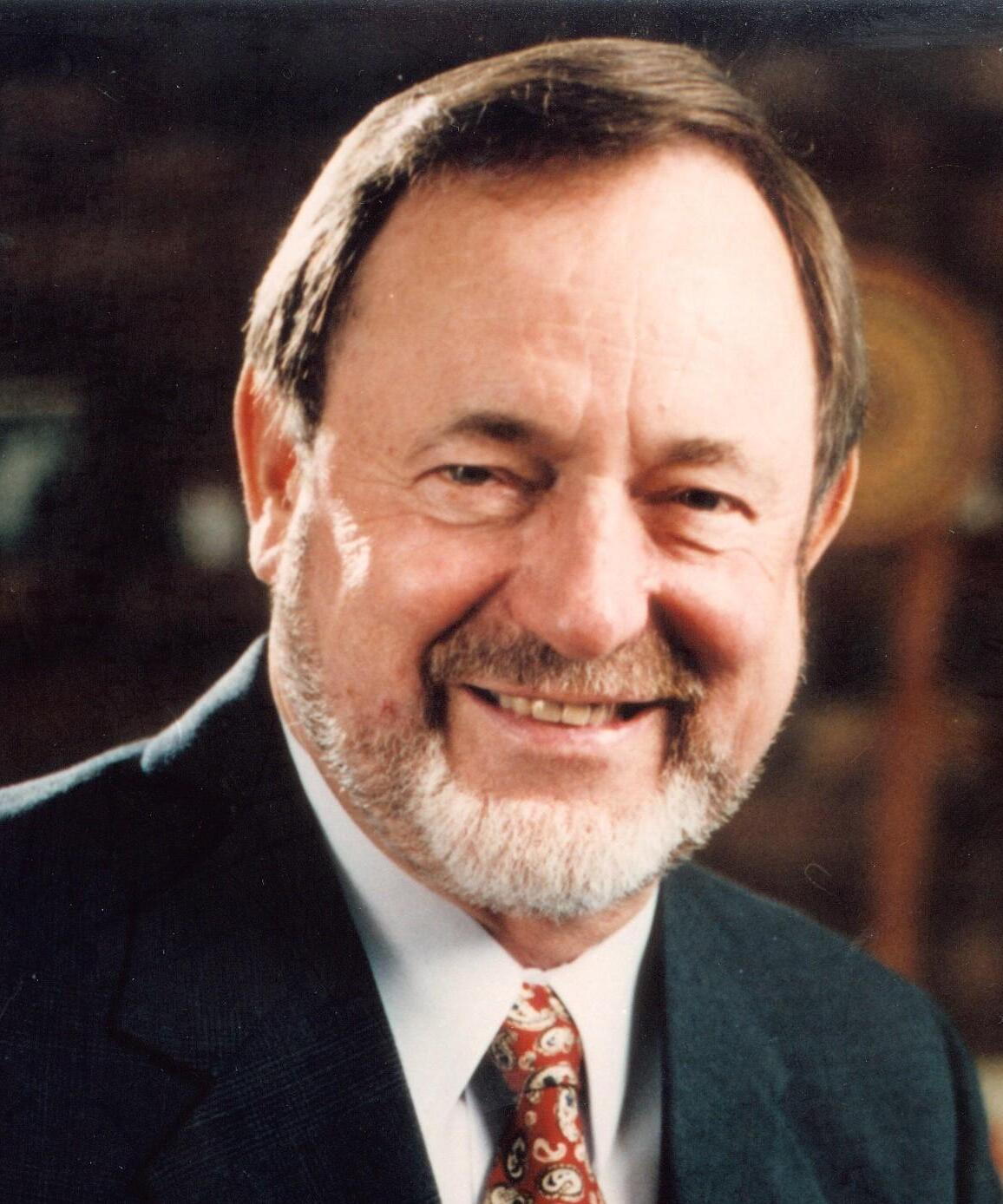

Nominee	Don Young	Clifford Greene	Russell deForest
Party	Republican	Democratic	Green
Popular vote	169,685	39,357	14,435
Percentage	74.51%	17.28%	6.34%
- Young: 50–60% 60–70% 70–80% 80–90%
Representative At-large before election
Don Young
Republican
Elected Representative At-large
Don Young
Republican

The Alaska congressional election of 2002 was held on Tuesday, November 5, 2002. The term of the state's sole Representative to the United States House of Representatives expired on January 3, 2003. The winning candidate would serve a two-year term from January 3, 2003, to January 3, 2005.

== General election ==
=== Predictions ===
Source	Ranking	As of
Sabato's Crystal Ball	Safe R	November 4, 2002
New York Times	Safe R	October 14, 2002

=== Results ===
2002 Alaska's at-large congressional district election
Party	Candidate	Votes	%
Republican	Don Young (inc.)	169,685	74.51
Democratic	Clifford Greene	39,357	17.28
Green	Russell deForest	14,435	6.34
Libertarian	Rob Clift	3,797	1.67
Write-in		451	0.20
Total votes		227,725	100.00
Republican hold			
