= 1988 United States House of Representatives election in Alaska =

- November 8, 1988
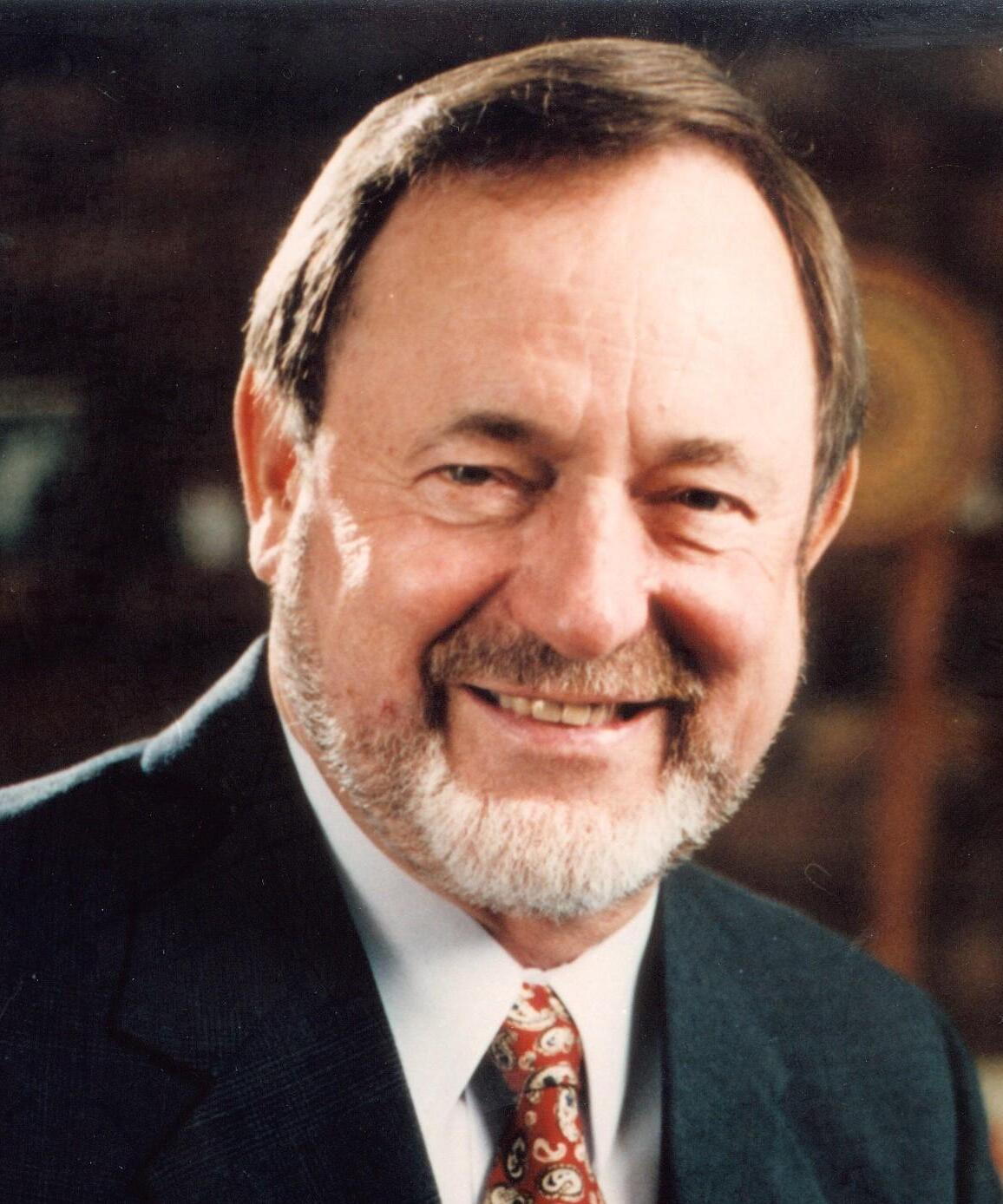

Nominee	Don Young	Peter Gruenstein
Party	Republican	Democratic
Popular vote	120,595	71,881
Percentage	62.5%	37.3%
- Results by state house district Young: 50–60% 60–70% 70–80%
Representative at-large before election
Don Young
Republican
Elected Representative at-large
Don Young
Republican

The Alaska congressional election of 1988 was held on Tuesday, November 8, 1988. The term of the state's sole Representative to the United States House of Representatives expired on January 3, 1989. The winning candidate would serve a two-year term from January 3, 1989, to January 3, 1991.

== General election ==
=== Results ===
1988 Alaska's at-large congressional district election
Party	Candidate	Votes	%
Republican	Don Young (inc.)	120,595	62.50
Democratic	Peter Gruenstein	71,881	37.25
Write-in		479	0.25
Total votes		192,955	100.00
Republican hold			
