= 1974 United States House of Representatives election in Alaska =

- November 5, 1974
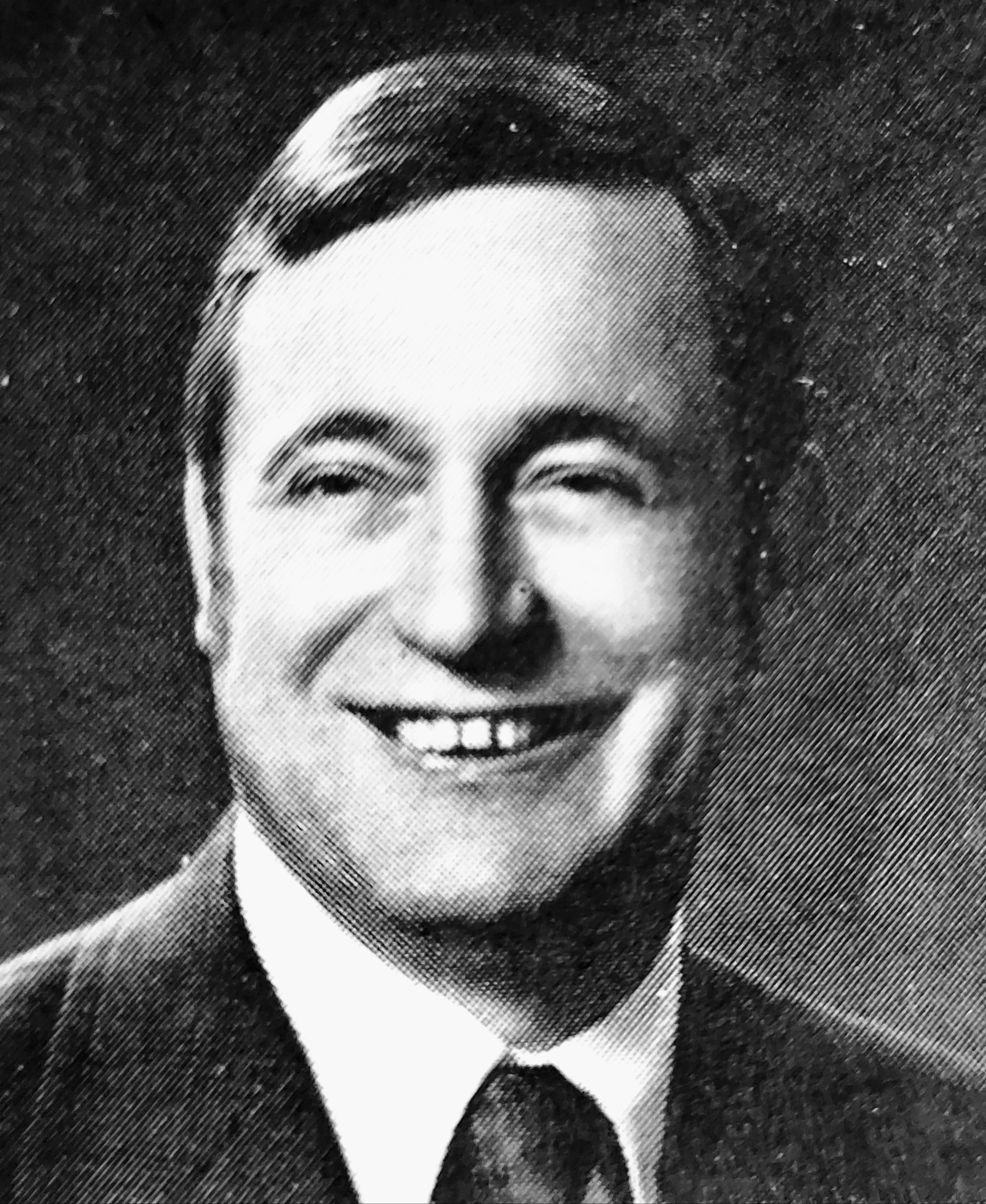

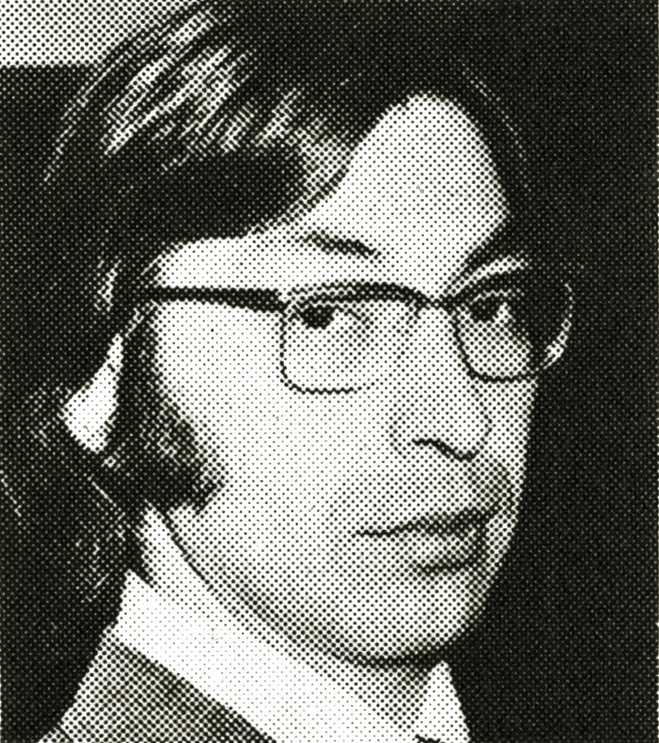
Nominee	Don Young	Willie Hensley
Party	Republican	Democratic
Popular vote	51,641	44,280
Percentage	53.8%	46.2%
- Results by state house district Young: 50–60% 60–70% Hensley: 50–60% 60–70% 80–90%
Representative at-large before election
Don Young
Republican
Elected Representative at-large
Don Young
Republican

The Alaska congressional election of 1974 was held on Tuesday, November 5, 1974. The term of the state's sole representative to the United States House of Representatives expired on January 3, 1975. The winning candidate would serve a two-year term from January 3, 1975, to January 3, 1977.

== General election ==
=== Results ===
1974 Alaska's at-large congressional district election
Party	Candidate	Votes	%
Republican	Don Young (inc.)	51,641	53.84
Democratic	Willie Hensley	44,280	46.16
Total votes		95,921	100.00
Republican hold			
