= 1976 United States House of Representatives election in Alaska =

- November 2, 1976
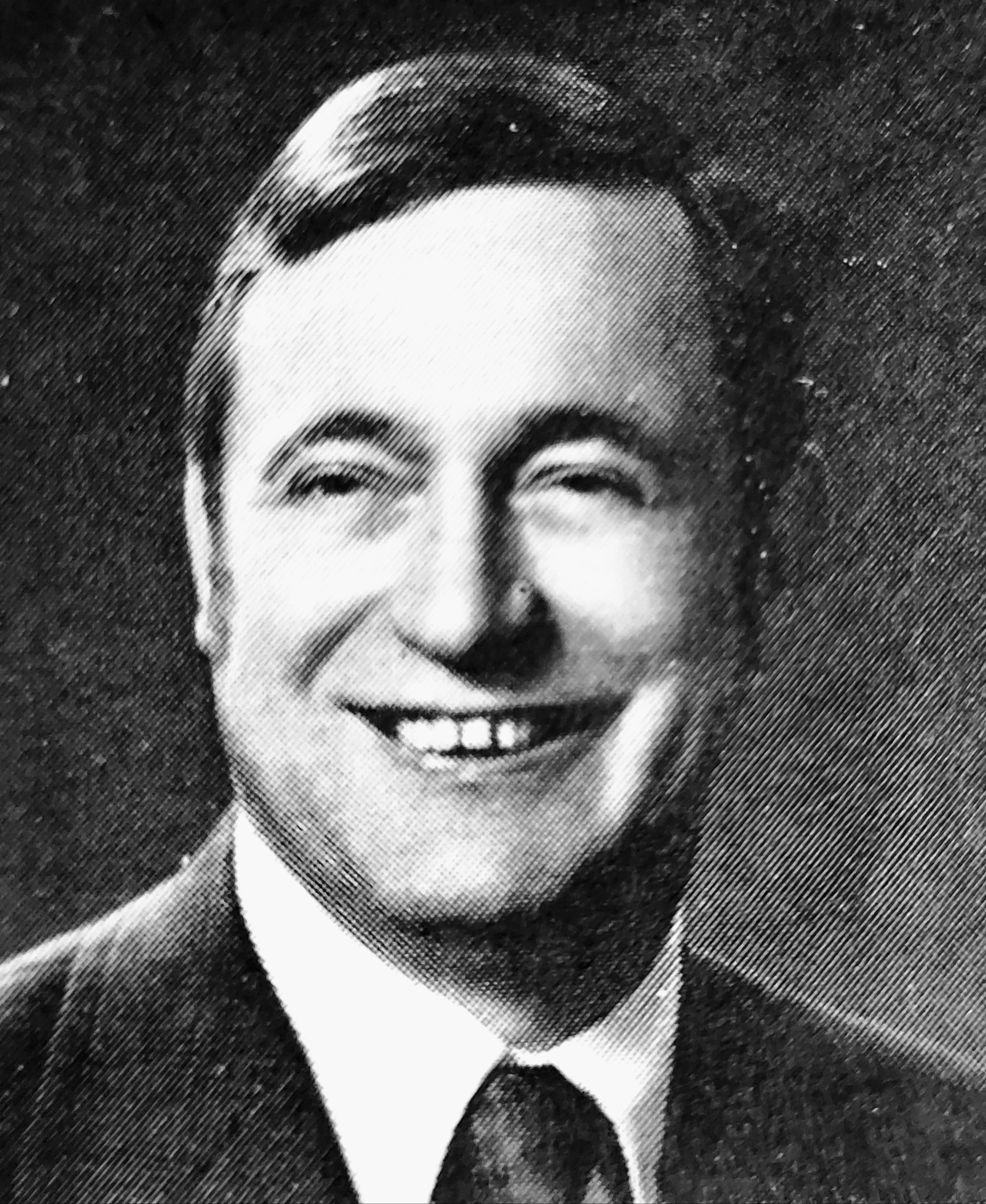

Nominee	Don Young	Eben Hopson
Party	Republican	Democratic
Popular vote	83,722	34,194
Percentage	70.8%	28.9%
- Results by state house district Young: 50–60% 60–70% 70–80% Hopson: 60–70%
Representative at-large before election
Don Young
Republican
Elected Representative at-large
Don Young
Republican

The Alaska congressional election of 1976 was held on Tuesday, November 2, 1976. The term of the state's sole representative to the United States House of Representatives expired on January 3, 1977. The winning candidate would serve a two-year term from January 3, 1977, to January 3, 1979.

== General election ==
=== Results ===
1976 Alaska's at-large congressional district election
Party	Candidate	Votes	%
Republican	Don Young (inc.)	83,722	70.83
Democratic	Eben Hopson	34,194	28.93
Write-in		292	0.25
Total votes		118,208	100.00
Republican hold			
