= 1972 United States House of Representatives election in Alaska =

- November 7, 1972
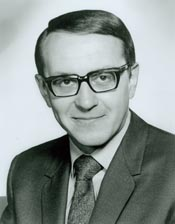

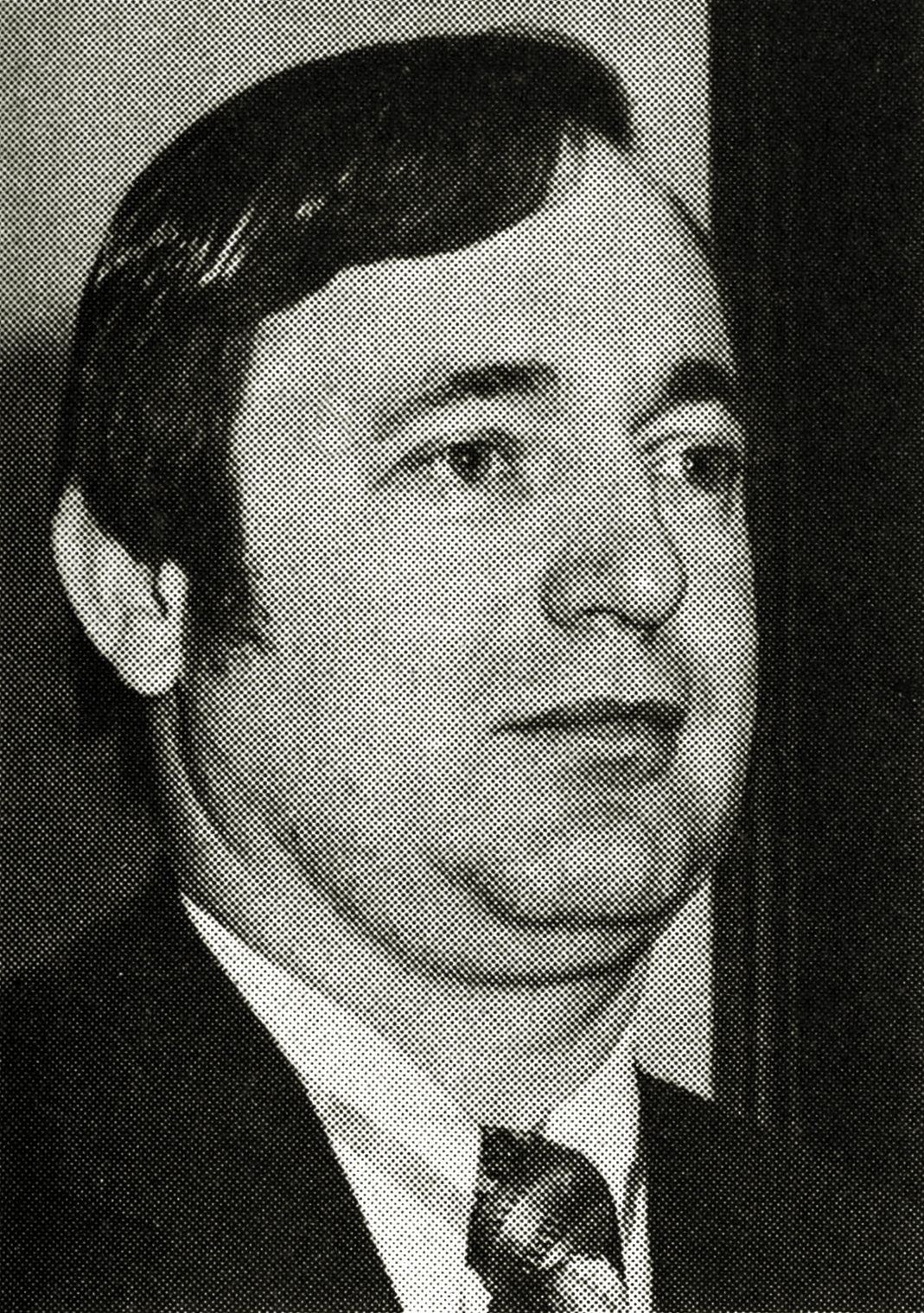
Nominee	Nick Begich Sr. †	Don Young
Party	Democratic	Republican
Popular vote	53,651	41,750
Percentage	56.2%	43.8%
- Begich: 50–60% 60–70% 70–80% Young: 50–60%
Representative At-large before election
Nick Begich Sr.
Democratic
Elected Representative At-large
Nick Begich Sr.
Democratic

The 1972 United States House of Representatives election in Alaska was held on November 7, 1972, to elect the United States representative from Alaska's at-large congressional district. Incumbent Democratic Representative Nick Begich Sr. went missing shortly before the general election, but still defeated Republican nominee Don Young.

This was the last time that a Democrat won Alaska's House seat until 2022's special election, when Mary Peltola was elected to succeed the late Young.

== Primary ==
On February 10, 1972, incumbent Representative Nick Begich Sr. announced that he would seek reelection to the House of Representatives. He had considered running for the Democratic senatorial nomination against Republican Senator Ted Stevens, but chose to run for reelection and reaffirmed his intention on March 27.

On April 7, Don Young, a member of the Alaska Senate, stated that he was considering running for the Republican nomination for Alaska's congressional district. At the Republican Party's state convention, the party gave its support to Young, although he had not formally announced his candidacy for the House of Representatives. On May 22, Young announced his candidacy after filing to run in Juneau.

On June 1, Bruce Dickerson Stevens filed to run for the Republican nomination, but did not actively campaign in the primary.

On August 22, the open primary was held in which Begich placed first with nearly 70% of the popular vote, Young placed second with 25.60%, and Stevens placed third with less than 5%.

=== Candidates ===
- Nick Begich Sr., member of the United States House of Representatives from Alaska's at-large congressional district (1971–1972)
- Bruce Dickerson Stevens, candidate in the 1970 United States House of Representatives election in Alaska
- Don Young, member of the Alaska House of Representatives (1967–1971) and Alaska Senate (1971–1973)

=== Results ===
1972 Alaska at-large congressional district open primary
Party	Candidate	Votes	%	±%
Democratic	Nick Begich Sr. (incumbent)	37,873	69.45%	
Republican	Don Young	13,958	25.60%	
Republican	Bruce Dickerson Stevens	2,703	4.96%	
Total votes		54,534	100.00%	

== General election ==
On September 6, 1972, Young challenged Begich to debate him, and Begich accepted on September 14. Four or five debates were planned to be held between Begich and Young, but Begich disappeared on October 16 while traveling by airplane with House Majority Leader Hale Boggs.

On October 19, Young suspended his campaign activities until Begich was found, but later resumed campaigning on October 28. Young stated that he believed that he was "doing what I think is best for the state" as if Begich was never found or discovered to have died then Alaska could not have a representative for six months until a special election was held to fill Begich's vacancy. House Minority Leader Gerald Ford stated that Alaska would possibly risk its seniority in the House of Representatives and House committee assignments if Young was not elected.

However, despite Young and Ford's statements, Begich won reelection with 56.24% of the popular vote against Young's 43.76%. Begich never reappeared and was declared dead in absentia in December 1972. His body was never found.

=== Results ===
1972 Alaska at-large congressional district election
Party	Candidate	Votes	%	±%
Democratic	Nick Begich Sr. (incumbent)	53,651	56.24%	+1.13%
Republican	Don Young	41,750	43.76%	−1.13%
Total votes		95,401	100.00%	

== See also ==
- 1972 United States House of Representatives elections
