= Nick Begich Sr. =

American politician and educator (1932–1972)

Nick Begich
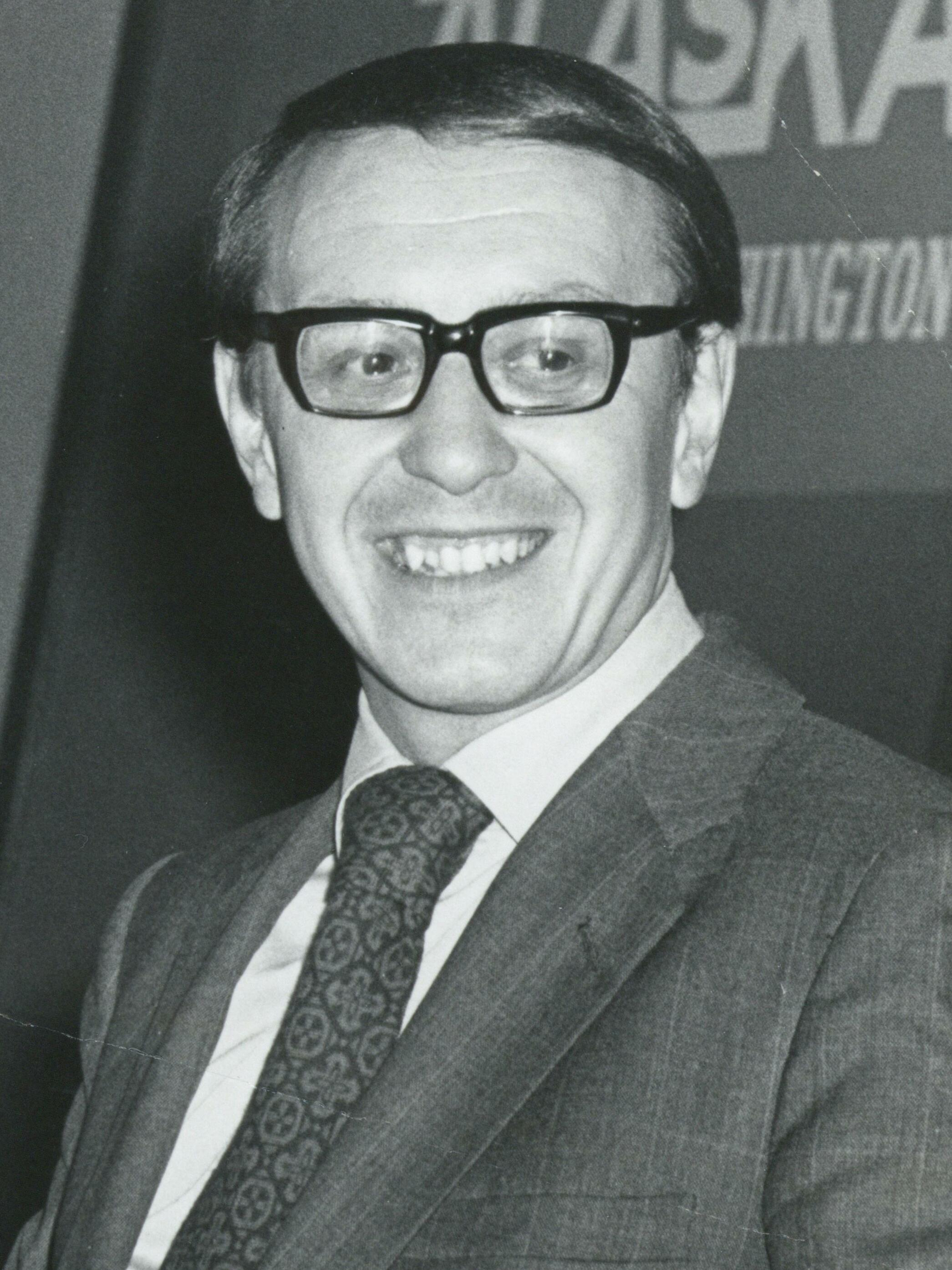
- Begich in 1972

Member of the U.S. House of Representatives from Alaska's at-large district
- In office January 3, 1971 – December 29, 1972
- Preceded by: Howard Pollock
- Succeeded by: Don Young

Member of the Alaska Senate
- In office 1962–1970

Personal details
- Born: Nicholas Joseph Begich; April 6, 1932 Eveleth, Minnesota, U.S.
- Party: Democratic
- Spouse: Margaret Jean Jendro (m. 1956)
- Children: 6, including Mark, Tom, and Nick Jr.
- Relatives: Joseph Begich (brother); Nick Begich III (grandson)
- Education: St. Cloud State University (BA); University of Minnesota (MA)
- Disappeared: October 16, 1972 (aged 40); Alaska, U.S.
- Status: Missing for 54 years and 1 month; declared dead in absentia on December 29, 1972 (aged 40)

Nicholas Joseph Begich Sr. (born April 6, 1932 – disappeared October 16, 1972; declared dead December 29, 1972) was an American politician, school counselor, and school administrator. He served in the Alaska state senate for eight years before being elected in 1970 as a member of the United States House of Representatives from Alaska. He is presumed to have died in the crash of a light aircraft in Alaska in October 1972; his body was never found. He was a member of the Democratic Party.

== Early life and education ==
Begich was born and raised in Eveleth, Minnesota. His father, John Begich (né Begić), was born in Podlapača, Udbina, Croatia. Nick Sr.'s mother, Anna (née Martinić), was also of Croatian descent. He earned a Bachelor of Arts from Saint Cloud State University in 1952 and a Master of Arts from the University of Minnesota in 1954. He took graduate courses at the University of Colorado Boulder and the University of North Dakota.

Both Begich and his brother Joseph made careers in politics. Joseph Begich stayed in Eveleth. He served 18 years in the Minnesota House of Representatives from that base.

== Career ==
Begich moved to Alaska after college, where he worked as a guidance counselor in the schools of Anchorage. He was later Director of Student Personnel for the Anchorage school system before becoming Superintendent of Schools at Fort Richardson.

In 1962, Begich was elected to the Alaska Senate, where he served for eight years. Begich also taught political science during parts of this period at the University of Alaska at Anchorage.

In 1968, Begich ran at-large for Alaska's only U.S. House seat. He lost to the incumbent, Republican Howard Pollock.

In 1970, Pollock ran for Governor of Alaska, and Begich ran again for Congress. He succeeded in defeating the Republican banker Frank Murkowski. The latter was later elected as a U.S. Senator and then as Governor of Alaska. In 1972 in his re-election race, Begich was opposed by Republican state senator Don Young.

Begich's plane went down weeks before the election but his body was not found. His name was still on the ballot, and Begich posthumously won the 1972 election, with 56% to Don Young's 44%. However, after Begich was declared dead, a special election was held. Young won the seat and retained it until his own death on March 18, 2022.

== Disappearance ==
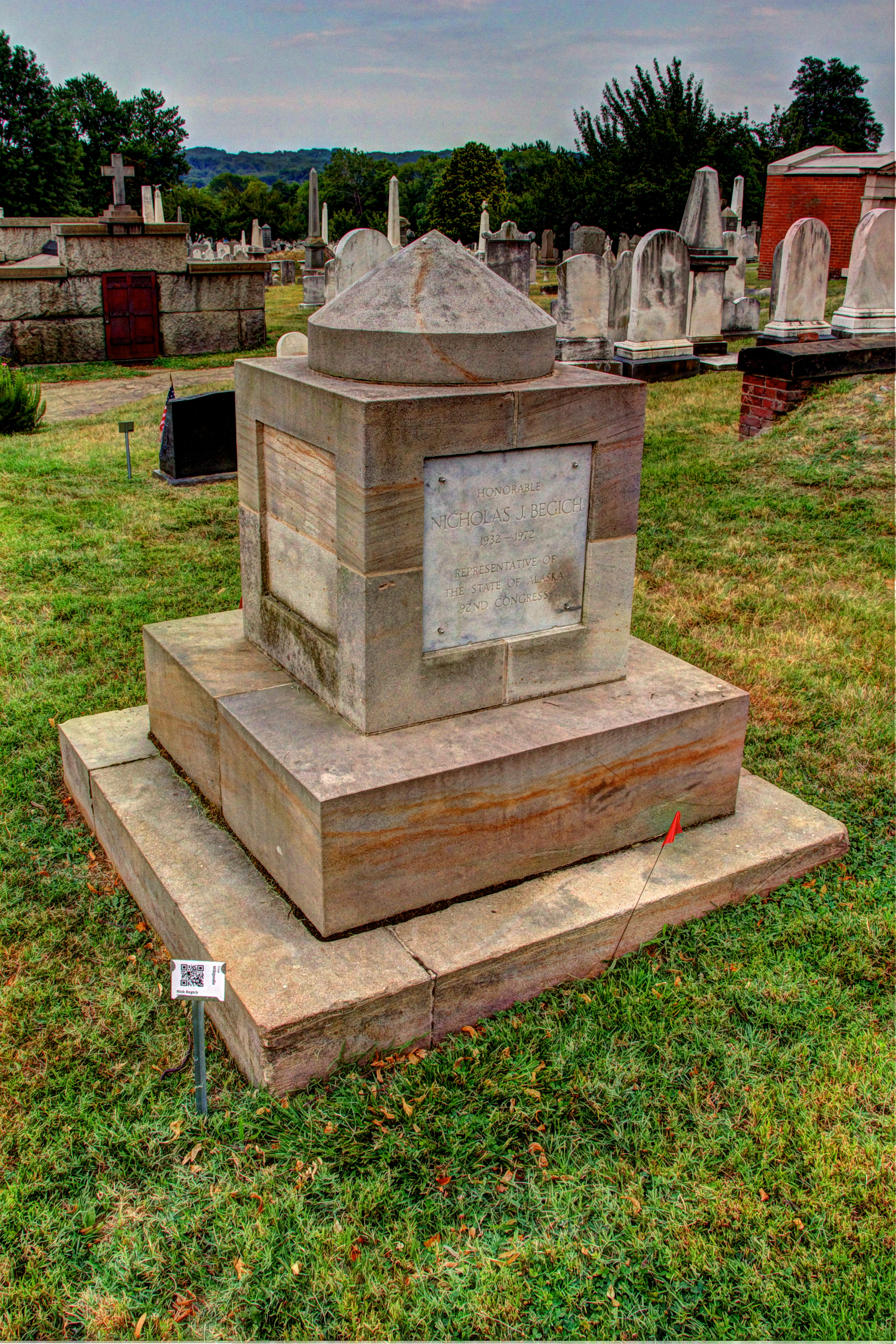
Begich's cenotaph at the Congressional Cemetery

On October 16, 1972, Begich and House Majority Leader Hale Boggs (D-Louisiana), were two of the four men on board a twin-engine Cessna 310 when the airplane disappeared during a flight from Anchorage to Juneau. Also on board were Begich's aide, Russell Brown, and the pilot, Don Jonz. The four were heading to a campaign fundraiser for Begich.

In an enormous search effort, search and rescue aircraft of the United States Coast Guard, Navy, Army, Air Force, Civil Air Patrol and civilians were deployed to look for the four men and the missing Cessna 310. After proceeding for 39 days, the air search was suspended on November 24, 1972. Neither the airplane nor any of its four occupants was ever found. The four men were all officially declared dead on December 29, 1972.

The Cessna was required to carry an emergency locator transmitter (ELT) per Alaska state statute section 02.35.115, Downed Aircraft Transmitting Device. This took effect on September 6, 1972, five weeks before the plane disappeared. The Alaska statute made reference to Federal Aviation Regulation 91.52, published on September 21, 1971, which mandated ELTs in aircraft such as this. It had an effective date of December 30, 1973, for existing aircraft.

No ELT signal determined to be from the plane was heard during the search. In its report on the incident, the National Transportation Safety Board (NTSB) stated that the pilot's portable ELT, permissible in lieu of a fixed ELT on the plane, was found in an aircraft at Fairbanks, Alaska. The report also notes that a witness saw an unidentified object in the pilot's briefcase that, except for color, resembled the portable ELT. The NTSB concluded that neither the pilot nor aircraft had an ELT.

== Legacy ==
In 1972, the tallest building in Whittier, Alaska, was renamed as Begich Towers in memory of Congressman Nick Begich. Begich Peak, which is three miles north of the Begich, Boggs Visitor Center at Portage Lake, was also named after him.

In November 2015, a Seattle Weekly story detailed the work of journalist Jonathan Walczak. Since 2012 he has investigated the plane crash and subsequent events in an effort to determine the fate of the flight that carried Begich and Boggs.

Walczak created a podcast about Begich's disappearance, which was released by iHeartMedia in the summer of 2020. The podcast, called Missing in Alaska, explored such conspiracy theories as that FBI Director J. Edgar Hoover or Detroit mobsters operating in Tucson had arranged for Hale Boggs to be assassinated.

== Electoral history ==
Alaska's at-large congressional district: Results 1968–1972
Year	Republican	Votes	Pct	Democrat	Votes	Pct
1968	Howard W. Pollock (inc.)	43,577	54.2%	N. J. Begich	36,785	45.8%
1970	Frank H. Murkowski	35,947	44.9%	N. J. Begich	44,137	55.1%
1972	Don Young	41,750	43.8%	N. J. Begich (inc.)	53,651	56.2%

== Personal life ==
In 1956, Begich married Margaret Jean Jendro, nicknamed Pegge. They had six children together: Nick Jr., Mark, Nichelle, Tom, Stephanie, and Paul.

Begich's widow, Pegge, married again, to Jerry Max Pasley. Their marriage did not last long. She ran against incumbent Don Young in 1984 and 1986 for the U.S. House seat her late husband had held, but lost to Young both times.

Two sons followed their parents into politics. Mark was elected as a member of the Anchorage Assembly, then became mayor. He was narrowly elected in 2008 as the junior U.S. senator from Alaska. The incumbent, Republican Ted Stevens, had been convicted of seven felonies, eight days before the 2008 election, after being caught up in the Alaska political corruption probe. The charges against Stevens were later set aside because of prosecutorial misconduct.

In 2016, Tom Begich won the Democratic primary nomination for Seat J in the Alaska Senate. He faced little opposition in that general election and since, and was redistricted to Seat I in 2020. He continued to hold that office until 2023.

Nick Begich III, son of Nick Jr. and grandson of Nick Begich, unsuccessfully ran for Seat A in District 2 of the Anchorage Assembly in 2016, for Alaska's at-large House seat in the 2022 special election, and for the same seat in the 2022 regular election. He won the House seat in 2024 as a Republican.

== See also ==
- List of people who disappeared mysteriously at sea
- List of members of the United States Congress who died in office (1950–1999)

U.S. House of Representatives
Preceded by Howard Pollock	Member of the U.S. House of Representatives from Alaska's at-large congressional district 1971–1972	Succeeded by Don Young
