= 1986 United States House of Representatives election in Alaska =

- November 4, 1986
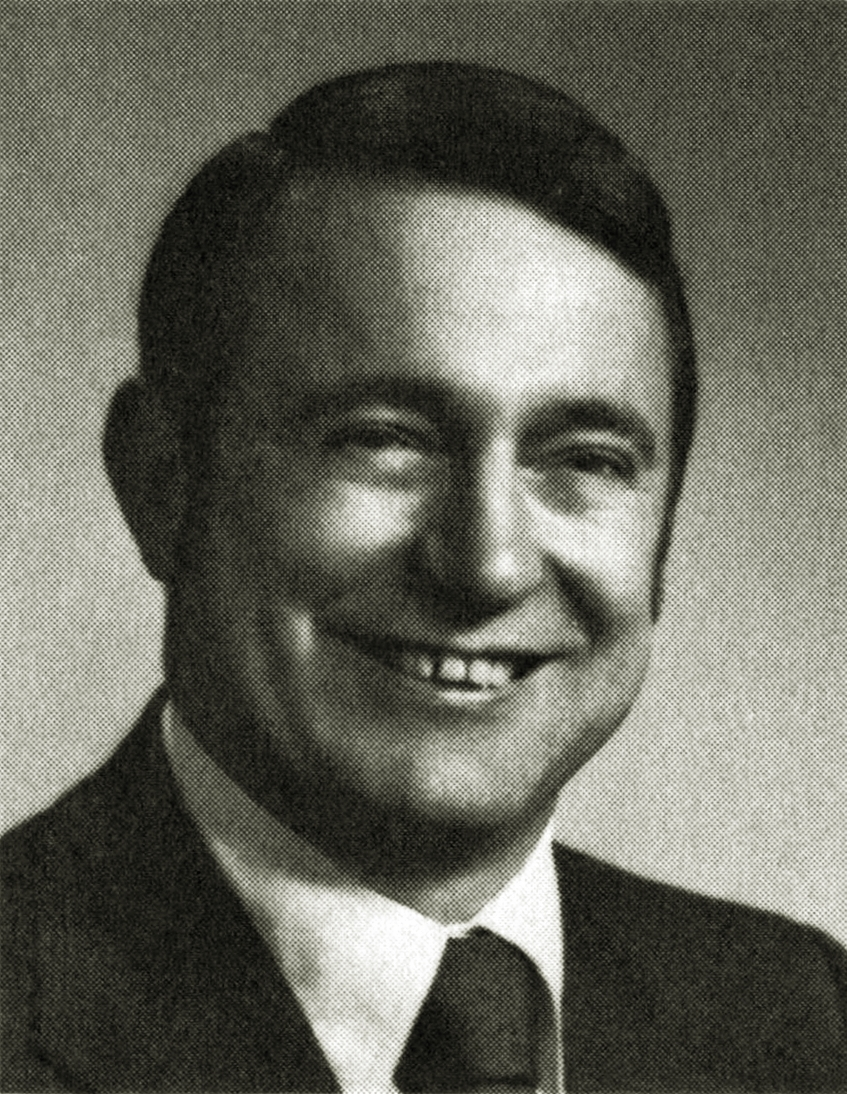

Nominee	Don Young	Pegge Begich
Party	Republican	Democratic
Popular vote	101,799	74,053
Percentage	56.5%	41.1%
- Results by state house district Young: 40–50% 50–60% 60–70% Begich: 50–60%
Representative at-large before election
Don Young
Republican
Elected Representative at-large
Don Young
Republican

The Alaska congressional election of 1986 was held on Tuesday, November 4, 1986. The term of the state's sole Representative to the United States House of Representatives expired on January 3, 1987. The winning candidate would serve a two-year term from January 3, 1987, to January 3, 1989.

== General election ==
=== Results ===
1986 Alaska's at-large congressional district election
Party	Candidate	Votes	%
Republican	Don Young (inc.)	101,799	56.47
Democratic	Pegge Begich	74,053	41.08
Libertarian	Betty Breck	4,182	2.32
Write-in		243	0.14
Total votes		180,277	100.00
Republican hold			
