= 1996 United States House of Representatives election in Alaska =

- November 5, 1996
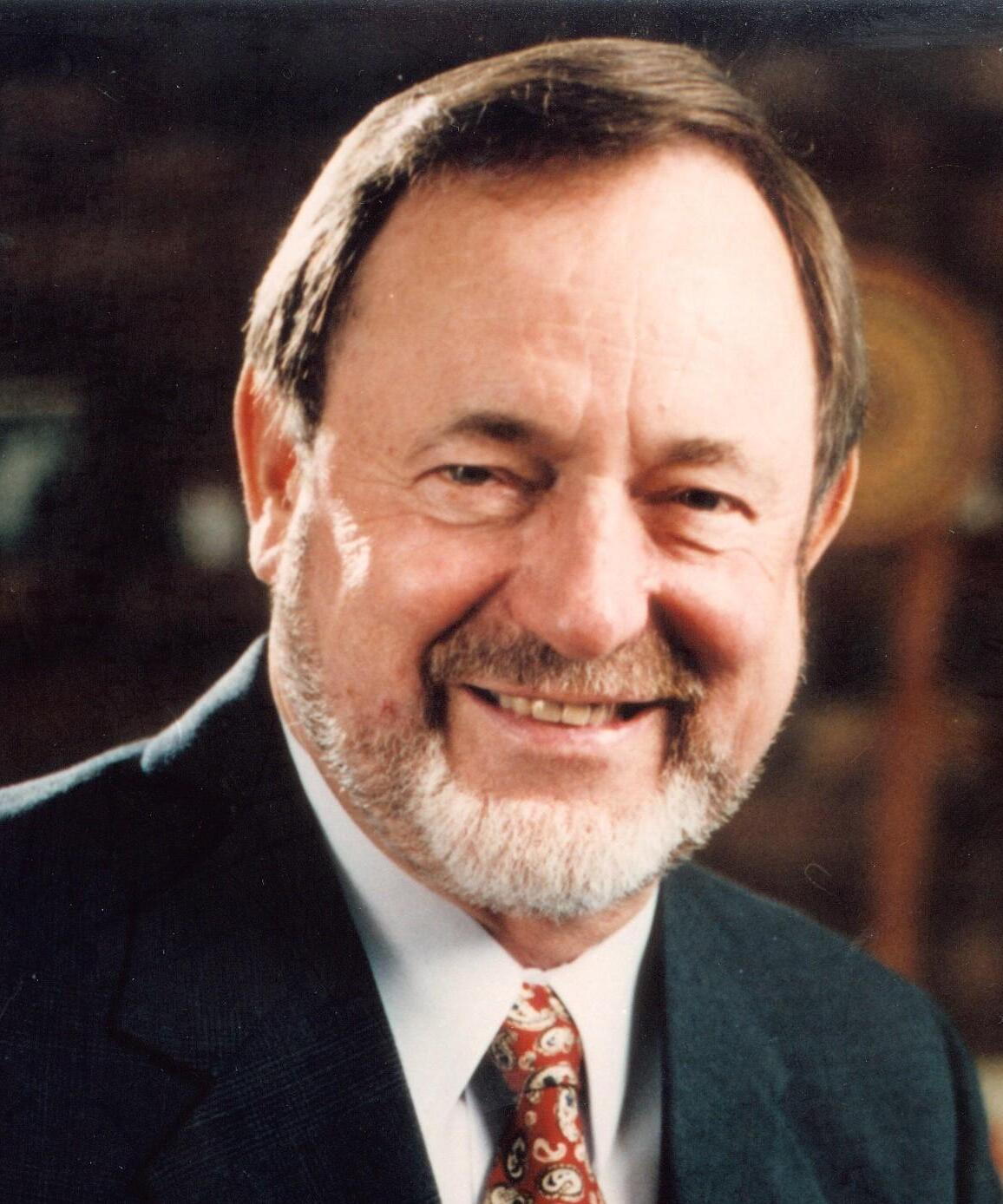

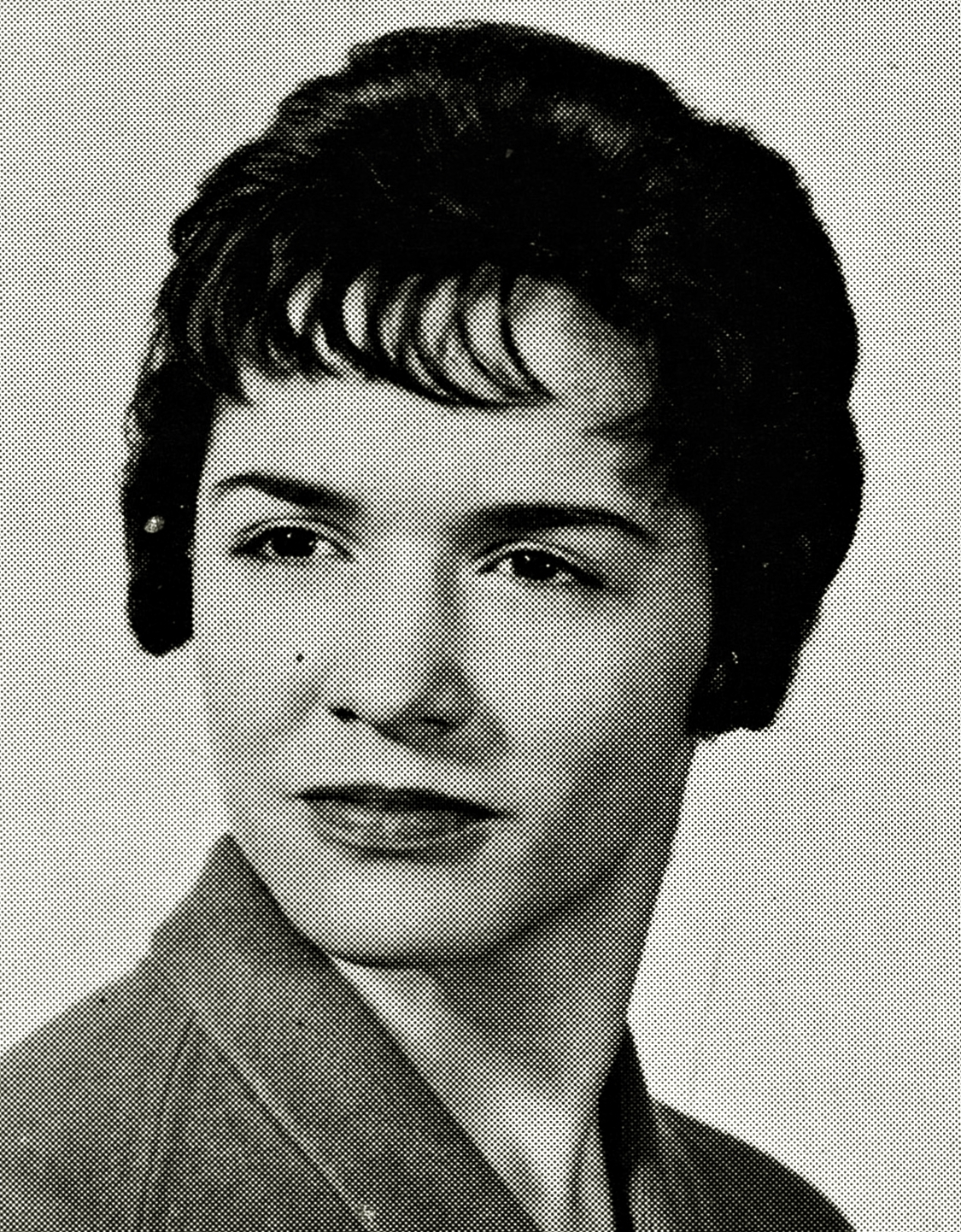
Nominee	Don Young	Georgianna Lincoln
Party	Republican	Democratic
Popular vote	138,834	85,114
Percentage	59.4%	36.4%
- Young: 40–50% 50–60% 60–70% 70–80% Lincoln: 40–50% 50–60% 60–70%
Representative at-large before election
Don Young
Republican
Elected Representative at-large
Don Young
Republican

The Alaska congressional election of 1996 was held on Tuesday, November 5, 1996. The term of the state's sole Representative to the United States House of Representatives expired on January 3, 1997. The winning candidate would serve a two-year term from January 3, 1997, to January 3, 1999.

== General election ==
=== Results ===
1996 Alaska's at-large congressional district election
Party	Candidate	Votes	%
Republican	Don Young (inc.)	138,834	59.41
Democratic	Georgianna Lincoln	85,114	36.42
Independence	William Nemec II	5,017	2.15
Green	John Grames	4,513	1.93
Write-in		222	0.10
Total votes		233,700	100.00
Republican hold			
