= 2004 United States House of Representatives election in Alaska =

- November 2, 2004
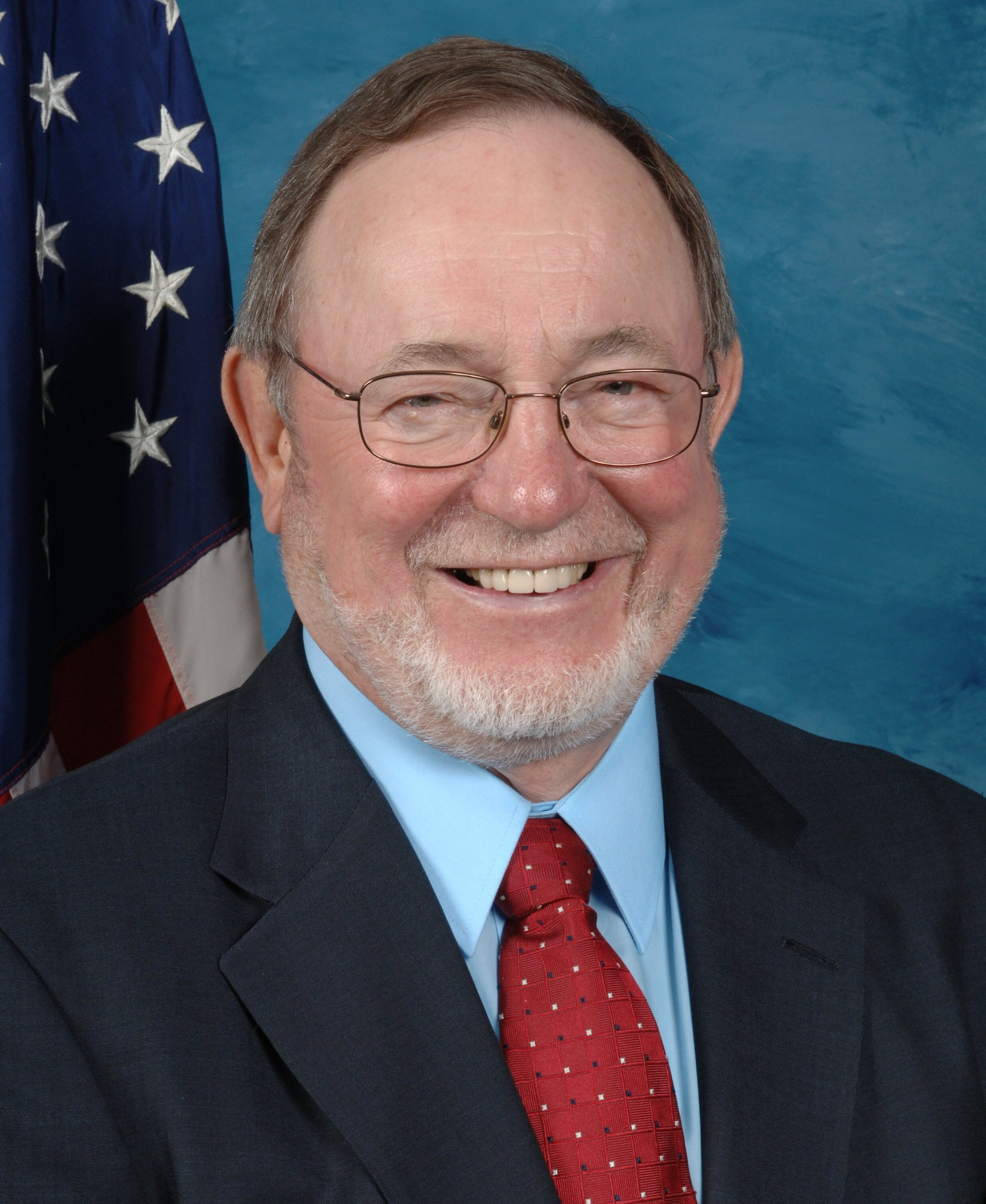

| Nominee | Don Young | Thomas M. Higgins |
| Party | Republican | Democratic |
| Popular vote | 213,216 | 67,074 |
| Percentage | 71.07% | 22.36% |
- Young: 50–60% 60–70% 70–80% 80–90%
Representative at-large before election
Don Young
Republican
Elected Representative at-large
Don Young
Republican

The Alaska congressional election of 2004 was held on Tuesday, November 2, 2004. The term of the state's sole Representative to the United States House of Representatives expired on January 3, 2005. The winning candidate would serve a two-year term from January 3, 2005, to January 3, 2007.

== General election ==
=== Predictions ===
| Source | Ranking | As of |
|---|---|---|
| The Cook Political Report | Safe R | October 29, 2004 |
| Sabato's Crystal Ball | Safe R | November 1, 2004 |

=== Results ===
2004 Alaska's at-large congressional district election
| Party | Candidate | Votes | % |
|---|---|---|---|
| Republican | Don Young (inc.) | 213,216 | 71.07 |
| Democratic | Thomas M. Higgins | 67,074 | 22.36 |
| Green | Timothy A. Feller | 11,434 | 3.81 |
| Libertarian | Alvin A. Anders | 7,157 | 2.39 |
| Write-in | | 1,115 | 0.37 |
| Total votes | | 299,996 | 100.00 |
| Republican hold | | | |
