= 1990 United States House of Representatives election in Alaska =

- November 6, 1990
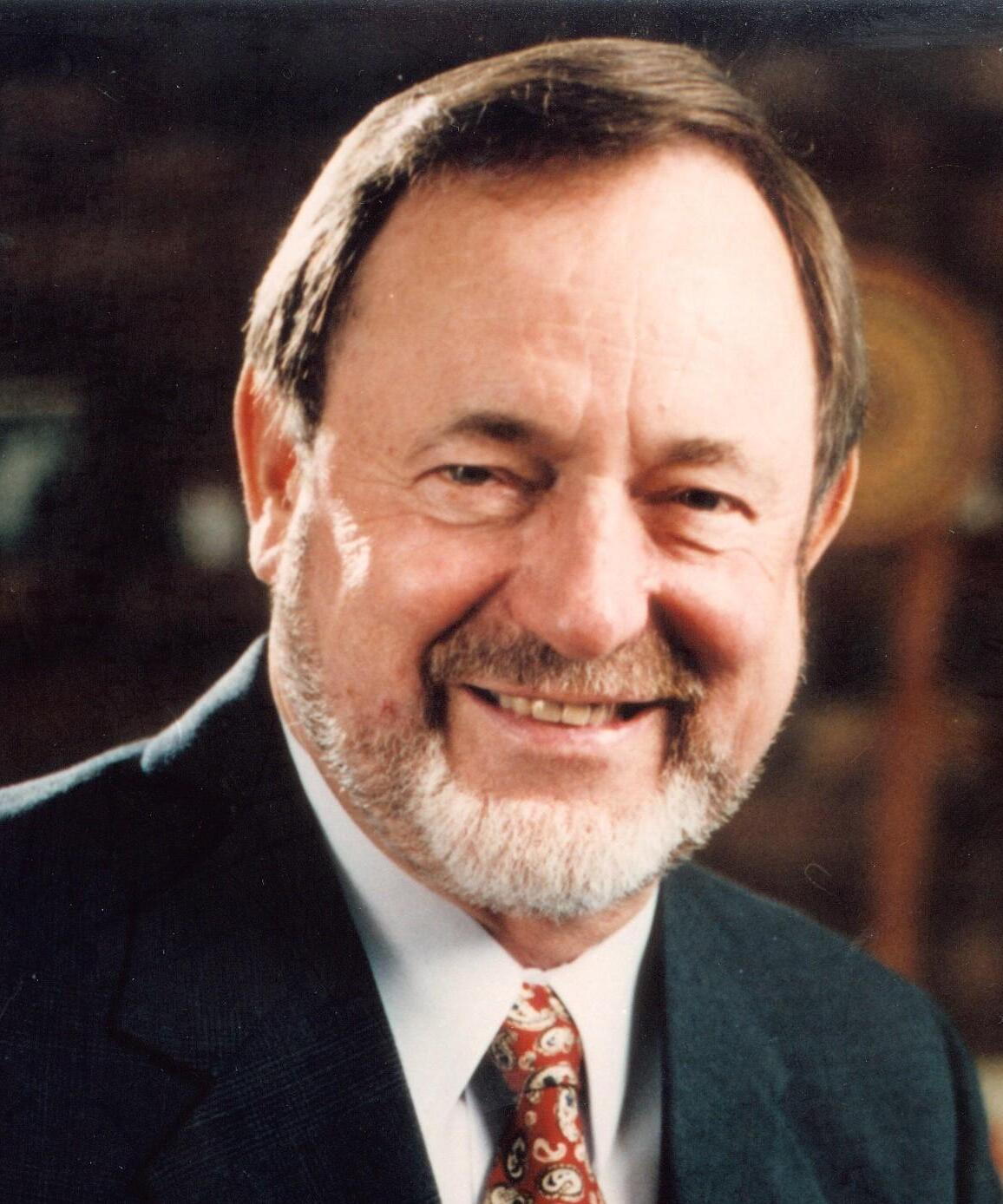

| Nominee | Don Young | John Devens |
| Party | Republican | Democratic |
| Popular vote | 99,003 | 91,677 |
| Percentage | 51.7% | 47.8% |
- Results by state house district Young: 40–50% 50–60% 60–70% 70–80% Devens: 50–60%
Representative at-large before election
Don Young
Republican
Elected Representative at-large
Don Young
Republican

The Alaska congressional election of 1990 was held on Tuesday, November 6, 1990. The term of the state's sole Representative to the United States House of Representatives expired on January 3, 1991. The winning candidate would serve a two-year term from January 3, 1991, to January 3, 1993.

== General election ==
=== Results ===
1990 Alaska's at-large congressional district election
| Party | Candidate | Votes | % |
|---|---|---|---|
| Republican | Don Young (inc.) | 99,003 | 51.66 |
| Democratic | John Devens | 91,677 | 47.84 |
| Write-in | | 967 | 0.51 |
| Total votes | | 191,647 | 100.00 |
| Republican hold | | | |
