= Ralph Rivers =

American politician (1903–1976)

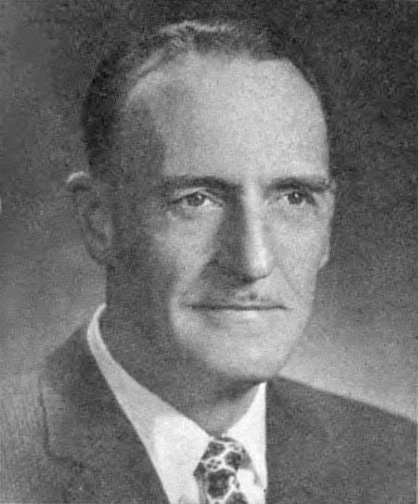

Member of the U.S. House of Representatives from Alaska's at-large district
- In office January 3, 1959 – December 30, 1966
- Preceded by: Bob Bartlett (Delegate); Himself (Shadow Representative)
- Succeeded by: Howard Pollock

Shadow Member of the U.S. House of Representatives from the Alaska Territory's at-large district
- In office October 6, 1956 – January 3, 1959
- Preceded by: Seat established
- Succeeded by: Himself (Representative)

Mayor of Fairbanks
- In office 1952–1954
- Preceded by: Robert Hoopes
- Succeeded by: Douglas Preston

Attorney General of the Alaska Territory
- In office 1945–1949
- Governor: Ernest Gruening
- Preceded by: Henry Roden
- Succeeded by: Gerald Williams

United States Attorney for the Fourth Division of Alaska Territory
- In office 1933–1944
- President: Franklin D. Roosevelt
- Preceded by: Julien Hurley
- Succeeded by: Harry Arend

Personal details
- Born: Ralph Julian Rivers; May 23, 1903 Seattle, Washington, U.S.
- Died: August 13, 1976 (aged 73) Chehalis, Washington, U.S.
- Party: Democratic
- Education: University of Washington, Seattle (LLB)

Ralph Julian Rivers (May 23, 1903 – August 13, 1976) was an American lawyer and Democratic politician who served as the first United States representative from Alaska, serving from statehood in 1959 to his resignation in 1966 following his defeat by Republican Howard W. Pollock. He previously served as the shadow U.S. Representative from Alaska Territory from 1956 to 1959.

== Biography ==
Born in Seattle, Washington to Louisa Zenaide (née Lavoy) and Julian Guy Rivers, Rivers attended grammar school in Flat, Alaska, and Franklin High School in Seattle. He worked as a gold miner in Flat from 1921 to 1923, and then earned an LL.B. from the University of Washington School of Law in 1929. He then worked as a lawyer in private practice for several years.

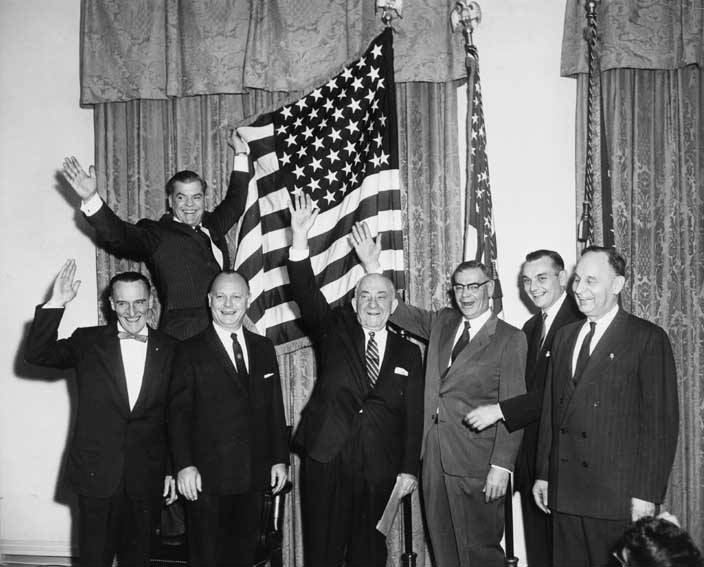
Rivers, at bottom left, celebrating Alaska becoming a state on January 3, 1959. Behind Rivers is Bob Atwood. To his left are Fred Seaton, Ernest Gruening, Bob Bartlett, Mike Stepovich and Waino Hendrickson.

Rivers was a lifelong civil servant, working in a number of public positions throughout his life. He served as United States Attorney for District of Alaska, from 1933 to 1944. He was then elected as the attorney general of Alaska, serving from 1945 to 1949. He was the chair of the Employment Security Commission of Alaska from 1950 to 1952, and then became the mayor of Fairbanks, Alaska from 1952 to 1954. In 1954 he was also president of the League of Alaskan Cities. He was a member of the Alaska Territorial Senate in 1955, and was the second vice president of the Alaska Constitutional Convention at College, Alaska in 1955 and 1956. He was a delegate to the Democratic National Conventions in 1960, 1964, and 1968.

Rivers appeared on the game show To Tell the Truth as contestant #1 in the second group of contestants on June 2, 1959. Rivers died at his home in Chehalis, Washington on the morning of August 13, 1976.

== U.S. House of Representatives ==
In 1957 and 1958, Rivers was a United States representative-elect under the Alaska-Tennessee Plan in Washington, D.C., on a provisional basis, pending statehood. Upon the admission of Alaska as a State into the Union, he was elected as a Democrat to the Eighty-sixth and to the three succeeding Congresses and served from January 3, 1959 until December 30, 1966. He was an unsuccessful candidate for reelection to the Ninetieth Congress in 1966, resigning days before the end of his term.

While in Congress, he voted in favor of the Civil Rights Act of 1960 and the Civil Rights Act of 1964. He voted as well for the 24th Amendment to the U.S. Constitution and the Voting Rights Act of 1965.

== Electoral history ==
Alaska's at-large congressional district: Results 1958–1966

Year	Republican	Votes	Pct	Democrat	Votes	Pct
1958	Henry A. Benson	20,699	42.5%	Ralph J. Rivers	27,948	57.5%
1960	R. L. Rettig	25,517	43.2%	Ralph J. Rivers (inc.)	33,546	56.8%
1962	Lowell Thomas, Jr.	26,638	44%	Ralph J. Rivers (inc.)	33,953	56%
1964	Lowell Thomas, Jr.	32,556	48.5%	Ralph J. Rivers (inc.)	34,590	51.5%
1966	Howard W. Pollock	34,040	51.6%	Ralph J. Rivers (inc.)	31,867	48.4%

U.S. House of Representatives
New seat	Shadow Member of the U.S. House of Representatives from the Alaska Territory's at-large district 1956–1959	Succeeded by Himself as U.S. Representative
Preceded by Bob Bartlett as Delegate	Member of the U.S. House of Representatives from Alaska's at-large congressional district 1959–1966	Succeeded by Howard Pollock
Preceded by Himself as Shadow Representative	Member of the U.S. House of Representatives from Alaska's at-large congressional district 1959–1966	Succeeded by Howard Pollock
