= Howard Pollock =

American politician (1920–2011)

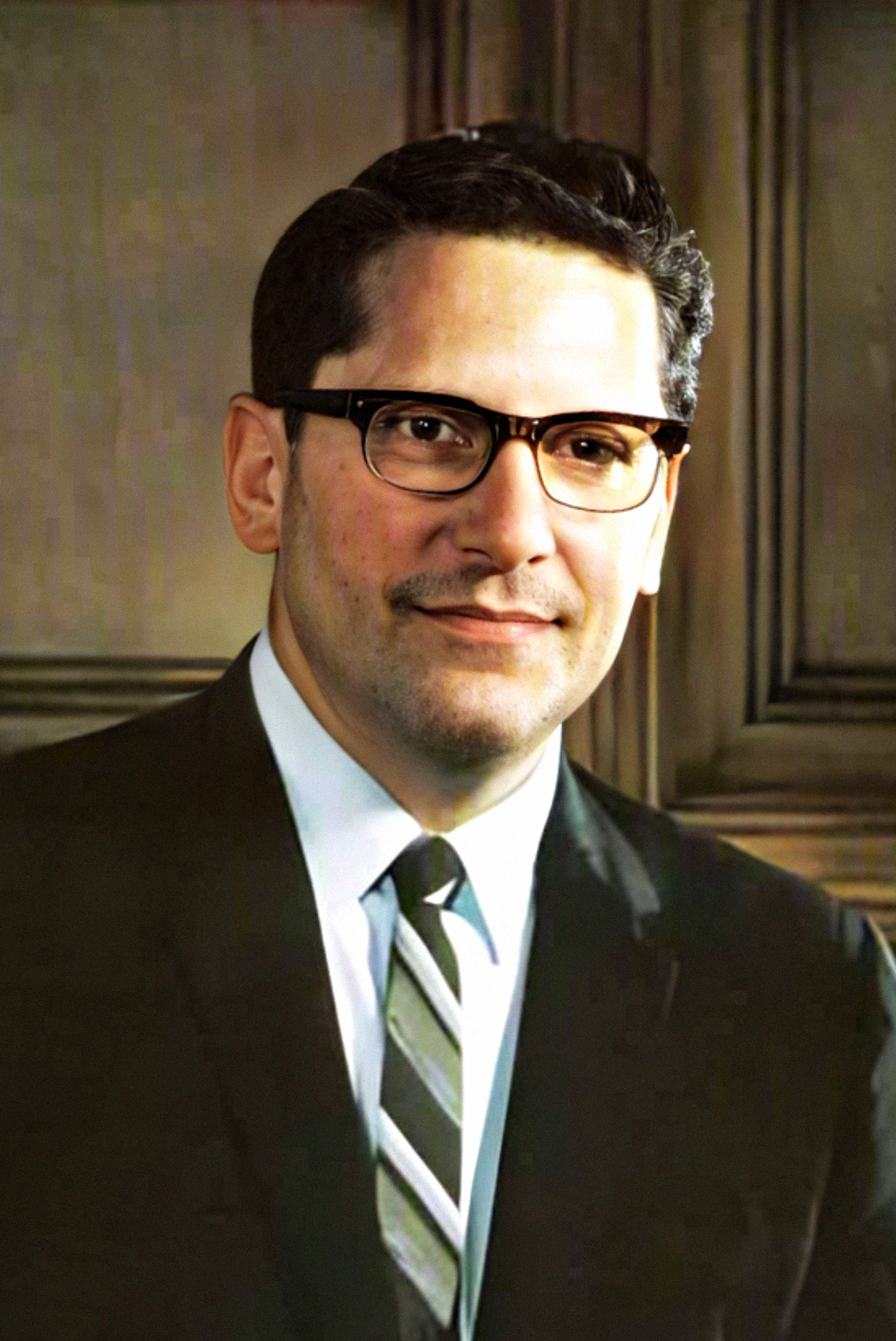

Member of the U.S. House of Representatives from Alaska's at-large district
- In office January 3, 1967 – January 3, 1971
- Preceded by: Ralph Rivers
- Succeeded by: Nick Begich Sr.

Personal details
- Born: Howard Wallace Pollock; April 11, 1920 Chicago, Illinois, U.S.
- Died: January 9, 2011 (aged 90) Coronado, California, U.S.
- Party: Republican
- Education: Mississippi Gulf Coast Community College; Santa Clara University; University of Houston (JD); Massachusetts Institute of Technology (MS); International University Vienna (PhD)

Military service
- Allegiance: United States
- Branch/service: United States Navy
- Years of service: 1941–1946
- Rank: Lieutenant Commander

Howard Wallace Pollock (April 11, 1920 – January 9, 2011) was an American politician and Republican representative from Alaska.

== Biography ==
Pollock was born in Chicago to Olga (née Deblanc) and Oscar Tobias Pollock, and grew up in New Orleans. He went to high school in Perkinston, Mississippi and graduated from Perkinston Junior College. He enlisted as a seaman in the United States Navy in 1941 and retired with rank of lieutenant commander in 1946. During his service in World War II, he lost his right forearm to a grenade accident while training in the South Pacific in 1944.

He studied law at Santa Clara University School of Law and at the University of Houston, and then did some post-graduate studies at MIT, from which he earned a M.S. in industrial management. He was a practicing attorney.

Pollock served in the Alaska Territorial Legislature from 1953 to 1955. He later served in the Alaska Senate from 1961 to 1963 and 1965–1966; and was elected as a Republican to the Ninetieth and Ninety-first Congresses (January 3, 1967 – January 3, 1971), being the first Republican elected to Congress from Alaska. He was not a candidate for reelection in 1970 to the Ninety-second Congress, but rather was an unsuccessful candidate for Republican nomination for Governor of Alaska. Pollock was also a past president of the National Rifle Association of America.

From 1998 until his death in January 2011, Pollock was a resident of Arlington, Virginia.

== Electoral history ==
Alaska's at-large congressional district: Results 1966–1968
Year	Republican	Votes	Pct	Democrat	Votes	Pct
1966	Howard W. Pollock	34,040	51.6%	Ralph J. Rivers (inc.)	31,867	48.4%
1968	Howard W. Pollock (inc.)	43,577	54.2%	N. J. Begich	36,785	45.8%

U.S. House of Representatives
Preceded by Ralph Rivers	Member of the U.S. House of Representatives from Alaska's at-large congressional district 1967–1971	Succeeded by Nick Begich
National Rifle Association of America
Preceded by Keith M. Gaffaney	President of the NRA; 1983–1985	Succeeded by Alonzo H. Garcelon
