= Gravina Island Highway =

Highway in Alaska

- Highway to Nowhere

Route information
- Maintained by AkDOT&PF
- Length: 3.2 mi (5.1 km)
- Existed: September 2008–present

Major junctions
- South end: Dead end point where original Gravina Island Bridge would have connected
- North end: Access road to Ketchikan International Airport near Ketchikan

Location
- Country: United States
- State: Alaska
- Boroughs: Ketchikan Gateway

Highway system
- Alaska Routes; Interstate; Scenic Byways

The Gravina Island Highway is a 3.2-mile-long (5.1 km) gravel highway located on Gravina Island, in the Ketchikan Gateway Borough of the U.S. state of Alaska. The highway was part of a project that would connect Gravina Island, specifically, the Ketchikan International Airport, to the city of Ketchikan. The Gravina Island Bridge, which would have connected the highway to Ketchikan was cancelled, but the highway was built. Because the highway does not pass by or connect to any village or other place of importance, it has been nicknamed the Highway to Nowhere.

== Route description ==
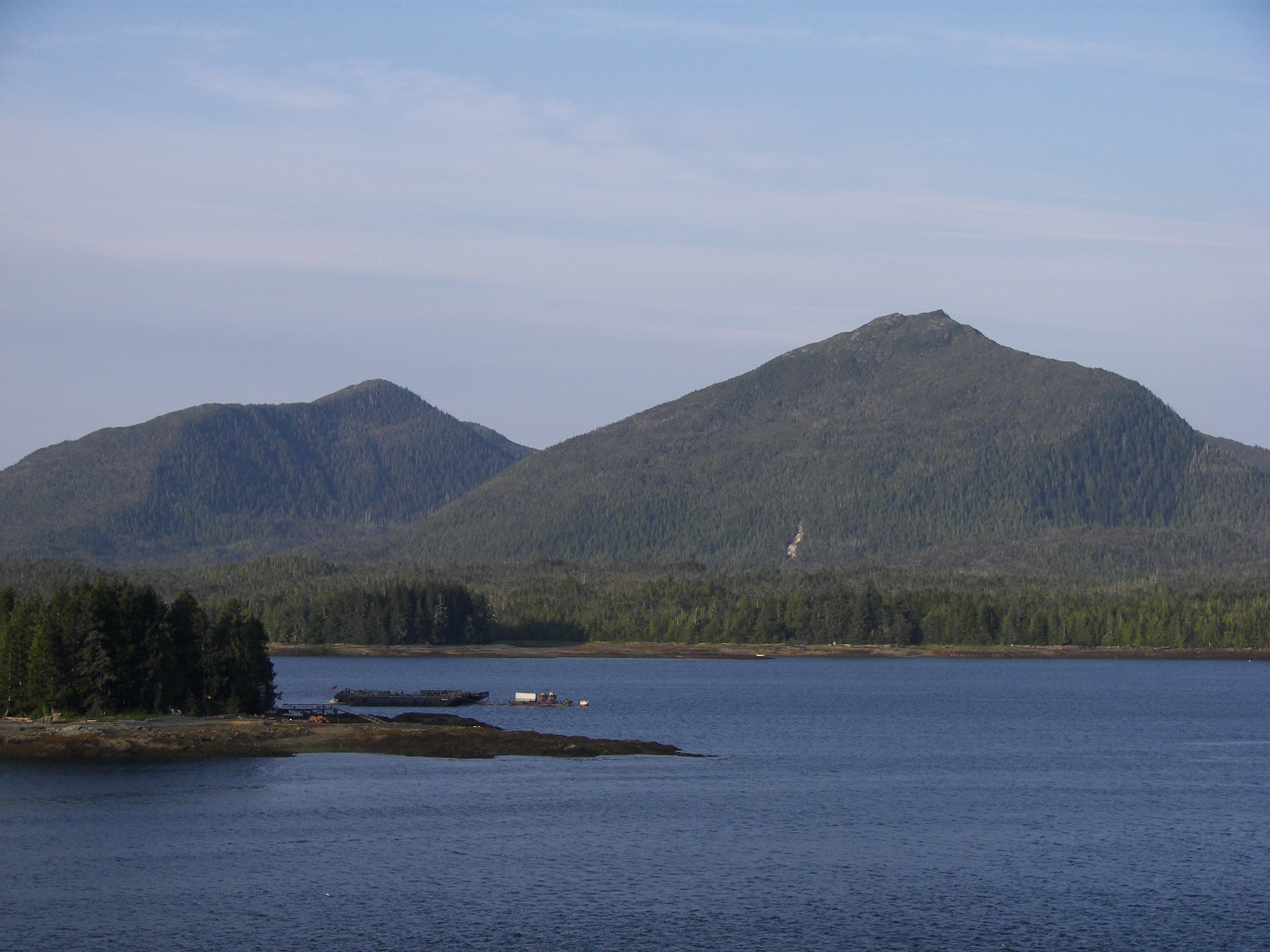
Gravina Island, as seen from Ketchikan

The Gravina Island Highway begins at a cul-de-sac on the coast of Gravina Island, at the point where the originally proposed bridge would have spanned. The highway then proceeds westward, as a two-lane, unpaved gravel road. After a short length, the road turns northward, passing a few small lakes, and a large forest. The roadway continues northwest, passing several small creeks, a small pond, and an unpaved private driveway. The highway then crosses over the Government Creek via the Government Creek Bridge, a 143-foot-long (44 m), two-lane, concrete-constructed bridge over the creek. The highway continues northwest, traveling near the coast for several miles, continuing through forests, before crossing Gravina Creek via the Gravina Creek Bridge, a 63-foot-long (19 m), two-lane, concrete-constructed bridge traveling over the creek. The road travels northwest for about another 0.1 miles (0.16 km), before intersecting a two-lane, gravel access road to the international airport. The Gravina Island Highway officially ends here, as does state maintenance, but a gravel road continues northwest. The road to northwest connects to a much simpler road. The access road has a tunnel under the airport runway.

== History ==
In the early 1980s, the state of Alaska began a study to create an improved connection between Gravina Island and Revillagigedo Island. The study was conducted to find an easy and effective way for transport between the two islands, in order to allow the city of Ketchikan to expand to the developmental land on Gravina Island.

In 2002, it was proposed that a for-profit prison corporation, Cornell Corrections, build a prison on the island. To connect the island with Ketchikan, it was originally planned that the federal government spend $175 million on building a bridge to the island, and another $75 million to connect it to the power grid with an electrical intertie. The Ketchikan Borough Assembly turned the proposal down when the administration of Governor Tony Knowles also expressed its disfavor to the idea. Eventually, the corporation's prison plans led to the exposure of the wide-ranging Alaska political corruption probe, which eventually ensnared U.S. Senator Ted Stevens. The bridge idea persisted. The 2005 Highway Bill provided for $223m to build the Gravina Island Bridge between Gravina Island and nearby Ketchikan, on Revillagigedo Island. The provisions and earmarks were negotiated by Alaska's Rep. Don Young, who chaired the House Transportation Committee and were supported by the Chair of the Senate Appropriations Committee, Alaska's Senator Stevens. This bridge, nicknamed "The Bridge to Nowhere" by critics, was intended to replace the auto ferry which is currently the only connection between Ketchikan and its airport. While the federal earmark was withdrawn after meeting opposition from Oklahoma Senator Tom Coburn, though the state of Alaska received $300 million in transportation funding, the state of Alaska continued to study improvements in access to the airport, which could conceivably include improvements to the ferry service. Despite the demise of the bridge proposal, Governor Sarah Palin spent $26 million in transportation funding for the planned access road on the island that ultimately served little use.

== Major junctions ==
The entire route is in Ketchikan Gateway Borough.

Location	mi	km	Destinations	Notes
	0.0	0.0	Cul-de-sac dead end	Southern terminus
	3.2	5.1	Ketchikan International Airport Access Road	North end of Gravina Island Highway naming
1.000 mi = 1.609 km; 1.000 km = 0.621 mi
