= Nonmotorized Transportation Pilot Program =

The Nonmotorized Transportation Pilot Program (NTPP) was created in 2005 as part of a six-year United States federal government transportation bill called SAFETEA-LU. According to the law,

the purpose of the program shall be to demonstrate the extent to which bicycling and walking can carry a significant part of the transportation load, and represent a major portion of the transportation solution, within selected communities.

It provides $21.5 million to each of four communities: Columbia, Missouri; Marin County, California; Minneapolis-Saint Paul, Minnesota; and Sheboygan County, Wisconsin. It will explore how these communities can increase rates of nonmotorized transportation by 2010 through investments in planning, infrastructure, and public education. The communities will also study how these investments will impact traffic congestion, energy use, health, and the environment.

The Minneapolis-St. Paul program, launched in 2007 as Bike/Walk Twin Cities, is administered by Transit for Livable Communities, a nonprofit organization. The third round of funding for Bike/Walk Twin Cities projects occurred in 2009 and included $1.75 million for Nice Ride Minnesota, a Minneapolis bike-sharing program, and $524,000 for a University of Minnesota Bike Center.

Between 2007 and 2013, pedestrian trips increased by 22.8% and bicycle trips increased by 48.3% across all four communities. An estimated 85.1 million vehicle miles traveled were averted between 2009 and 2013. The communities also observed an increase in safety with a 20% decrease in pedestrian fatalities and a 28.6% decrease in bicycle fatalities between 2002 and 2012.
