= Harry Newell =

Harry Newell may refer to:

- Harry Newell (actor), appeared in the 2003 film Peter Pan
- Harry Newell (fireboat), stationed in Ketchikan, Alaska, named after a firefighter who died in the line of duty in 1955
- Harry Newell (artist), Australian-born conceptional artist of South African and Mauritian descent.
