= United We Ride =

United We Ride is an interagency Federal (United States) national initiative that supports states and local communities in developing coordinated human service delivery systems, generally focused around public transit. In addition to coordination grants, United We Ride provides state and local agencies with transportation-coordination and planning self-assessment tools, technical assistance, and other resources. Eleven federal agencies and one Presidential initiative make up the United We Ride program.

== History ==
In June 2003, the Government Accountability Office identified 62 federal funding streams that in some form supported transportation. Many of the agencies could not identify what percentage of their budget was spent on transportation.

On February 24, 2004, the President of the United States issued an executive order establishing the Interagency Transportation Coordinating Council on Access and Mobility (CCAM). The council's members are eleven Federal departments, including the Departments of Transportation, Health and Human Services, Labor, Education, Housing and Urban Affairs, Agriculture, Justice, Interior, the Veterans Administration, the Social Security Administration, and the National Council on Disabilities. This led to United We Ride.

As required, the Council provided a report to the President within one year. The report identified five broad recommendations to improve the strategic use of federal funds to support public and human service transportation: Coordinated Transportation Planning, Vehicle Sharing, Reporting and Evaluation, Cost Allocation, and Consolidated Access Transportation Demonstration Programs.

The passage of SAFETEA-LU (The Safe, Accountable, Flexible, Efficient Transportation Equity Act: A Legacy for Users) in 2005 introduced a requirement that programs funded under Sections 5310, 5316, and 5317 be derived from locally developed, coordinated human services transportation plans. As a result, the United We Ride initiative has gained traction in statewide transportation planning in the United States.
