= Gravina Island Bridge =

Proposed bridge in Alaska, United States

- Coordinates: 55°21′06″N 131°42′57″W
- Carries: Gravina Island Highway
- Crosses: Inside Passage
- Locale: Ketchikan, Alaska
- Other name: Bridge to Nowhere

History
- Construction start: Never constructed
- Construction cost: Estimated budget of $398 million
- Replaces: Ketchikan International Airport Ferry

Location
- Interactive map of Gravina Island Bridge

The Gravina Island Bridge, commonly referred to as the "Bridge to Nowhere", was a proposed bridge to replace the ferry that currently connects the town of Ketchikan, Alaska, United States, with Gravina Island, an island that contains the Ketchikan International Airport as well as 50 residents. The bridge was projected to cost $398 million. Members of the Alaskan congressional delegation, particularly Representative Don Young and Senator Ted Stevens, were the bridge's biggest advocates in Congress, and helped push for federal funding. The project encountered fierce opposition outside Alaska as a symbol of pork barrel spending and is labeled as one of the more prominent "bridges to nowhere". As a result, Congress removed the federal earmark for the bridge in 2005. Funding for the "Bridge to Nowhere" was continued as of March 2, 2011, in the passing of H.R. 662: Surface Transportation Extension Act of 2011 by the House of Representatives, and finally cancelled in 2015.

== Background ==
According to the Alaska Department of Transportation & Public Facilities, the project's goal was to "provide better service to the airport and allow for development of large tracts of land on the island".

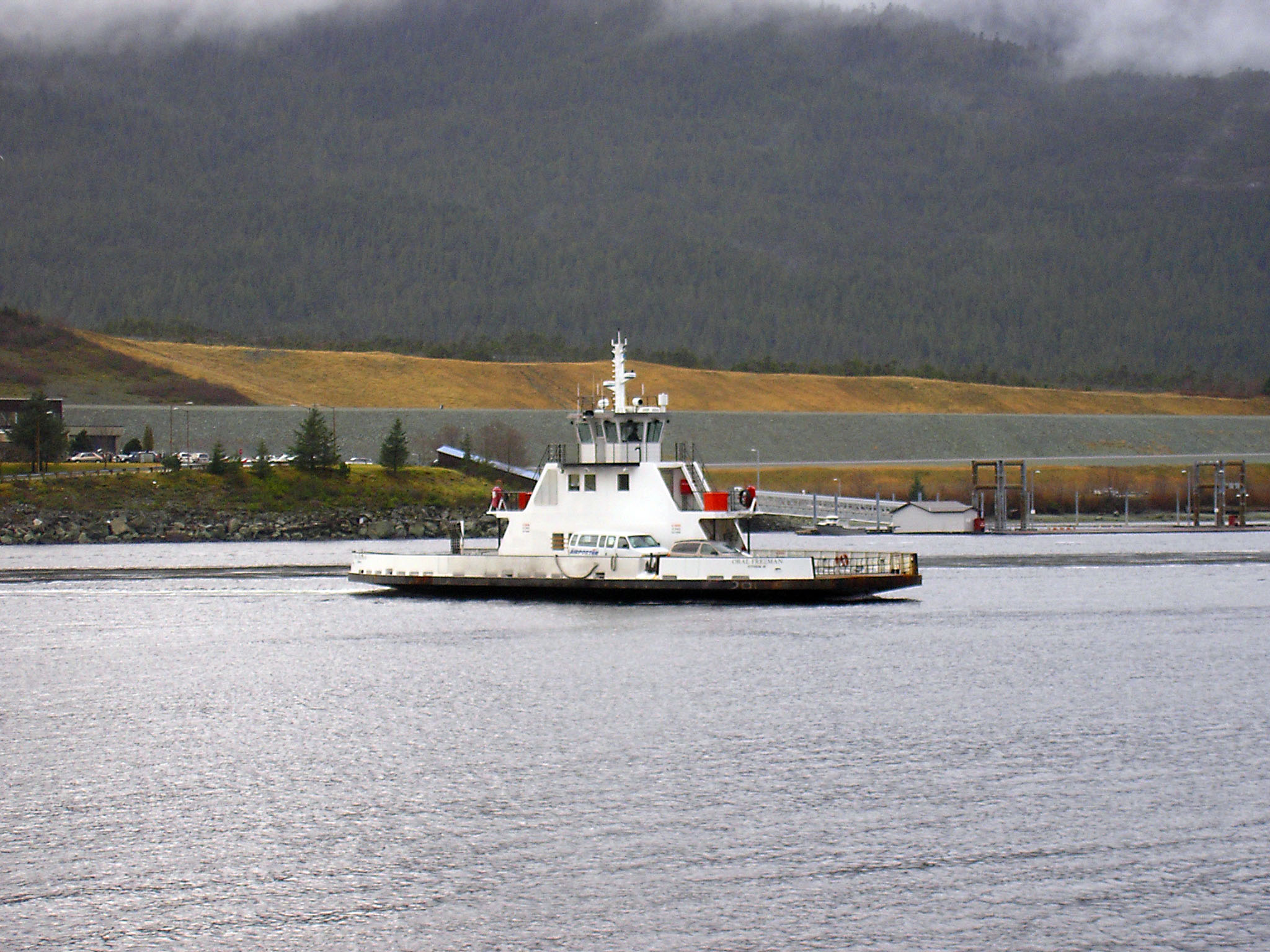
The Ketchikan and Gravina Island Ferry in 2005

A ferry runs to the island every 30 minutes, and every 15 minutes during the May–September peak tourist season. As of April 2021, it charged US$6 (equivalent to $7.13 in 2025) per adult, with free same-day return, and $7 (equivalent to $8.32 in 2025) per automobile also with same day return.

According to USA Today, the bridge was to have been nearly as long as the Golden Gate Bridge, which is 1.7 miles (2.7 km) long, and "higher than the Brooklyn Bridge".

Ketchikan's airport is the second largest in Southeast Alaska, after Juneau International Airport, and handled over 200,000 passengers a year or 550 per day, while the ferry shuttled 350,000 people in the same time period (as of December 2006).

A number of alternative bridge routes were considered. The decision in September 2004 was for two bridges, connecting Pennock Island in the middle, known as Alternative F1.

== History ==
The controversy began with the 2006 National Appropriations Bill, an omnibus spending bill covering transportation, housing, and urban development for the following year. On October 20, 2005, H.R. 3058 [109th]'s first version passed the U.S. Senate with 93 votes for, 1 against.

On October 21, 2005, Sen. Tom Coburn (R-OK) offered an amendment to remove funds for the Gravina Island and Knik Arm bridges, and divert the funds to rebuild a bridge over Lake Pontchartrain that was damaged by Hurricane Katrina. Republican Senator Ted Stevens of Alaska became the object of strong media criticism when he strongly opposed diverting the Gravina and Knik Arm Bridge funds to help in the disaster aid. In his speech on the Senate floor, Stevens threatened to quit Congress if the funds were removed from his state. On November 16, 2005, Congress stripped the specific earmark allocation of federal funds for the two bridges in the final edition of the omnibus spending bill, without changing the amount of money allocated for use by Alaska. The Coburn Amendment was defeated with a heavy bipartisan majority, with 15 senators in favor of the amendment and 82 senators in opposition.

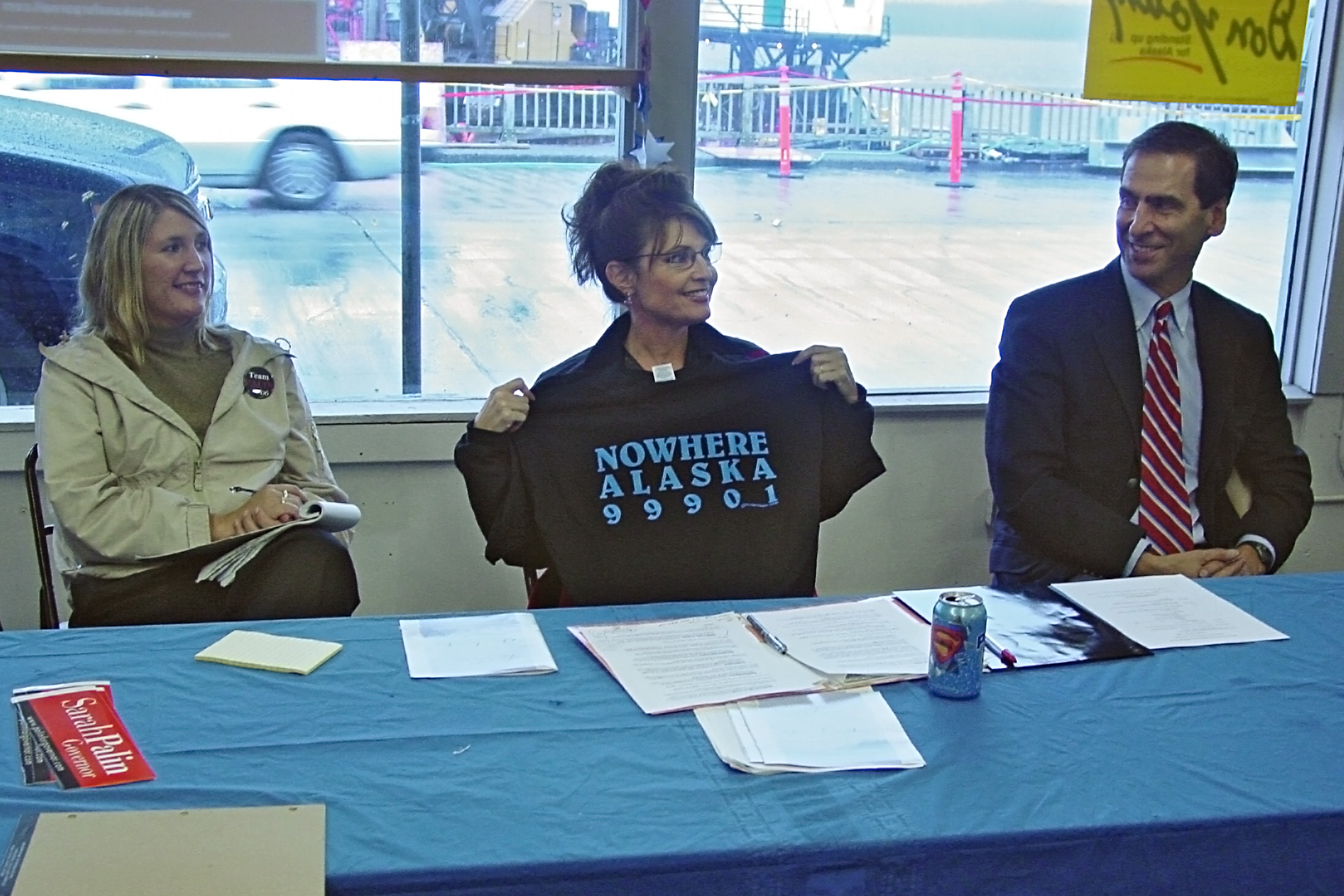
On September 20, 2006, Sarah Palin visited Ketchikan on her gubernatorial campaign and said the bridge was essential for the town's prosperity.

In September 2006, during her campaign for Governor, Sarah Palin visited Ketchikan to express her support for the Gravina Island Bridge project. At a public forum, Palin held up a pro-bridge T-shirt designed by a Ketchikan artist, Mary Ida Henrikson. The legend on the shirt was "Nowhere Alaska 99901", referencing the buzzword of "Bridge to Nowhere" and the primary ZIP code of Ketchikan. In her public comments, referring to her own residence in the Matanuska-Susitna Valley, she said: "OK, you've got Valley trash standing here in the middle of nowhere. I think we're going to make a good team as we progress that bridge project" in response to an insult expressed by the state Senate president, Ben Stevens.

In October 2006, when asked, "Would you continue state funding for the proposed Knik Arm and Gravina Island bridges?", she answered: "Yes. I would like to see Alaska's infrastructure projects built sooner rather than later. The window is now – while our congressional delegation is in a strong position to assist." Later that month, at a Chamber of Commerce meeting in Wasilla, Alaska, Democratic candidate Tony Knowles criticized Palin for supporting the Knik Arm Bridge, the Gravina Island Bridge, and a road north out of Juneau instead of rebuilding the Parks Highway. The Ketchikan Daily News noted that, of the gubernatorial candidates, "Only Palin is consistent in support all of the projects".

During her inaugural address on December 4, 2006, Governor Palin pledged responsible spending. On January 17, 2007, she sent a revised budget to the president of the Alaska Senate that would restrict capital spending and rescinded the $185 million state share of the bridge funding.

In August 2007, Alaska's Department of Transportation stated that it was "leaning" toward alternative ferry options, citing bridge costs and Governor Palin's reluctance to pay the state's match to the appropriated federal funds. A month later, in September 2007, Palin formally canceled the project. Palin stated:

Ketchikan desires a better way to reach the airport, but the $398 million bridge is not the answer. Despite the work of our congressional delegation, we are about $329 million short of full funding for the bridge project, and it's clear that Congress has little interest in spending any more money on a bridge between Ketchikan and Gravina Island. Much of the public's attitude toward Alaska bridges is based on inaccurate portrayals of the projects here. But we need to focus on what we can do, rather than fight over what has happened.

Asked why she initially supported the bridge, Palin's communications director Bill McAllister said, "It was never at the top of her priority list, and in fact the project isn't necessarily dead [...] there's still the potential for improved ferry service or even a bridge of a less costly design". She changed her mind, he said, when "she saw that Alaska was being perceived as taking from the country and not giving".

The city of Ketchikan has already begun to develop roads and a small amount of infrastructure for Gravina Island's 50 inhabitants. However, residents continue to seek funding for the Ketchikan-Gravina span.

== 2008 campaign issue ==
On August 29, 2008, when introduced as Republican presidential nominee John McCain's running mate, Governor Palin told the crowd: "I told Congress, thanks but no thanks on that bridge to nowhere" –a line which garnered big applause but upset political leaders in Ketchikan. Palin's campaign coordinator in the city, Republican Mike Elerding, remarked, "She said 'thanks but no thanks,' but they kept the money." Ketchikan's Democratic Mayor Bob Weinstein also criticized Palin for using the term bridge to nowhere, which she had said was insulting when she was in favor of the bridge.

Although Palin was originally a main proponent of the bridge, McCain–Palin television advertisements claimed that Palin "stopped the Bridge to Nowhere". Palin's Chief of Staff, Billy Moening, has been praised by many Republican strategists for recommending Palin change her stance on the bridge. These claims have been widely questioned or described as misleading in several newspapers across the political spectrum. Howard Kurtz called this a "whopper", writing: "She endorsed the remote project while running for governor in 2006, claimed to be an opponent only after Congress killed its funding the next year and has used the $223 million provided for it for other state ventures." Newsweek, commenting on Palin's "astonishing pivot", remarked: "Now she talks as if she always opposed the funding."

McCain himself also weighed in on the Gravina Island Bridge. In advertisements, McCain labeled the bridge as wasteful spending, and in an August 2007 town hall speech recorded on video and quoted again on April 30, 2008, he blamed the Minneapolis I-35 bridge collapse on the Gravina Island Bridge. His advertising and comments that (before September 21, 2006) contradicted Governor Sarah Palin's support of the bridge drew the attention of the media when he chose Palin as his running mate, opening the ticket to charges of hypocrisy.

While discussing the Gravina Island Bridge during an ABC News interview that aired on September 12, 2008, Charles Gibson made the following comment: "but it's now pretty clearly documented. You supported that bridge before you opposed it. You were wearing a T-shirt in the 2006 campaign, showed your support for the bridge to nowhere." Palin interrupted Gibson and insisted, "I was wearing a T-shirt with the zip code of the community that was asking for that bridge. Not all the people in that community even were asking for a $400 million or $300 million bridge."

Many media groups in the U.S. noted that Palin changed her position regarding the bridges, and concluded that she exaggerated her claim that she stopped the proposals from going through. According to the Los Angeles Times, for instance, while seeking votes for her governorship race, Palin told Ketchikan residents that she backed the "bridge to nowhere"; as governor, she spent the money elsewhere and moved ahead with a $26-million road to the nonexistent bridge.

== Road to nowhere ==
After canceling the bridge, Palin's administration spent more than $25 million to build the Gravina Island Highway, which would have connected with the proposed bridge. According to Alaskan state officials, the road project went ahead because the money came from the federal government, and would otherwise have had to be returned. Because "no one seems to use" this road, it has been called the "road to nowhere" by CNN, many local Alaskans, and several other media sources.

CNN reporter Abbie Boudreau took a helicopter over the road. "There's no one on this road," she said. "It kind of just curves around then it just stops. That's where the bridge was supposed to pick up." Boudreau spoke to Mike Elerding, Palin's former campaign coordinator. When asked if he felt the road was "a waste of taxpayer money", he responded, "Without the bridge, yeah." Boudreau also spoke to the McCain–Palin campaign spokesperson Meghan Stapleton, who defended the road: "The governor could not change that earmark. ... That had to be spent on the Gravina road and nothing else. And so, the governor had no options." In response to an inquiry of whether Palin could have stopped construction, Stapleton told Boudreau that Palin had "no viable alternative" because Congress had already granted the earmark, and the contract for the road was signed before Palin took office.

Alaska Department of Transportation spokesman Roger Wetherell disagreed, stating that Palin could have canceled the contract upon taking office and reimbursed contractors for any expenses incurred in association with the project, as happened when Palin cancelled a $18.6 million contract on a Juneau road and reimbursed the contractor for $65,500 in expenses. Federal Highway Administration spokesman Doug Hecox stated that Palin could have opted not to use the federal earmark, which would have allowed Congress the opportunity to send it to other federal needs.

== Post Palin ==
In 2011, funding for the project was continued in H.R. 662. Rep. Jared Polis (D-CO) spoke in support of a motion to recommit the bill (i.e., end the funding) In response, Rep. Mica (R-FL), spoke in opposition (i.e., keep the funding). The motion lost and the funding was kept. H.R. 662 passed both houses of Congress and became Public Law 112-5.

In 2015, after considering several lower-cost options, the Gravina Island Bridge project was canceled, and an improved ferry service was selected over constructing the bridge.

When Palin sought elected office in the US House of Representatives in 2022 against Nick Begich III, Ketchikan residents and her opponent continued to criticize her handling of the bridge and its cancellation.

== See also ==
- Safe, Accountable, Flexible, Efficient Transportation Equity Act: A Legacy for Users – "Bridge to Nowhere"

== Bibliography ==
- "Gravina Access Project, Environmental Impact Statement, Figure 2.10, Alternative F1, Bridges (200' East and 120' West), Between Tongass Avenue and Airport, via Pennock Island: Alignment" (PDF). Alaska DOT. January 21, 2004. Archived from the original (PDF) on March 5, 2010. (Map of the bridge route chosen in September 2004, Alternative F1.)
