= George Silides =

American politician (1922–2022)

Member of the Alaska Senate from the J district
- In office April 3, 1973 – January 20, 1975
- Appointed by: William A. Egan
- Preceded by: Don Young
- Succeeded by: Redistricted

Personal details
- Born: George Constantine Silides; June 28, 1922 New York City, U.S.
- Died: February 17, 2022 (aged 99) Escondido, California, U.S.
- Party: Republican
- Education: United States Military Academy
- Profession: Engineer

George Constantine Silides (June 28, 1922 – February 17, 2022) was an American politician who was a member of the Alaska Senate from 1973 to 1974. A Republican, Silides was appointed to fill the vacancy created when Don Young was elected to the United States House of Representatives.

== Life and career ==
Silides was born in New York City, New York and graduated from Stuyvesant High School in 1938. He graduated from United States Military Academy at West Point in 1946 with an engineering degree. He served in the United States Army. He moved to Alaska and started an engineering firm near Fairbanks.

Prior to serving in the Senate, Silides ran unsuccessfully three times for the Alaska House.

In 1976, Silides brought a case to the Alaska Supreme Court asserting that he complied with the filing requirements of the state in an attempt to run for House District 20.

Silides moved to Escondido, California with his wife, when he retired. He died on February 17, 2022, in Escondido, at the age of 99.
