= Gravina Island =

Island in Alexander Archipelago, Alaska, US

Coordinates: 55°18′14″N 131°47′11″W

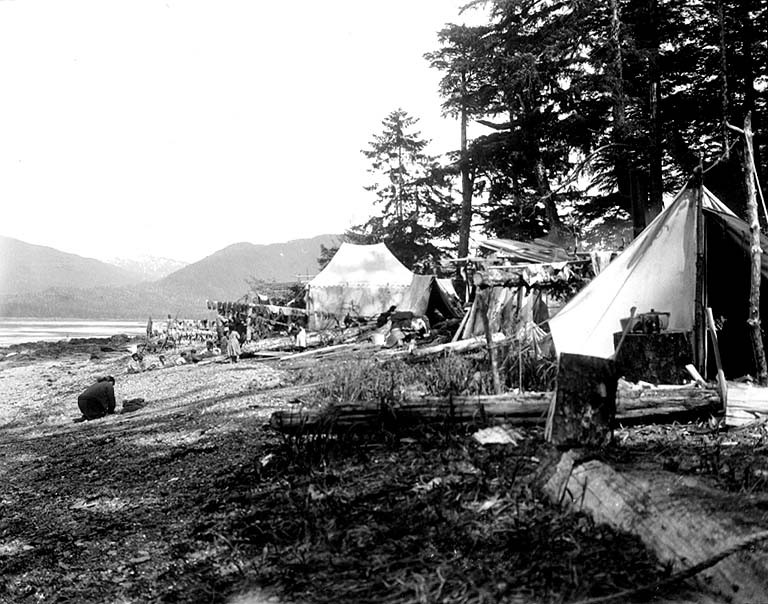
Camp of King Salmon trollers at Vallenar Point, 1902

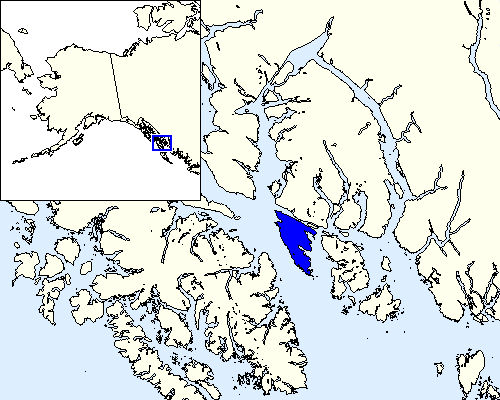
Map showing location of Gravina Island.

Gravina Island is an island in the Gravina Islands of the Alexander Archipelago in southeastern Alaska. It is 21 miles (34 km) long and about 9.5 miles (15.3 km) wide, with a land area of 94.81 square miles (245.6 km^{2}). The island had a population of 50 people at the 2000 census.

The Spanish explorer Jacinto Caamaño named the Gravina Islands group in 1792. George Vancouver applied the name to Gravina Island itself in 1793. The name honors Federico Carlos Gravina y Nápoli which was originated in the town of Gravina in Puglia, Italy.

Ketchikan International Airport is located on Gravina Island across the Tongass Narrows (½ mile) from Ketchikan and is reached by a ferry service which takes between three and seven minutes and runs at least every half-hour. A bridge to the island was first proposed in 2002. Its high cost, combined with the island's low population, resulted in critics calling it the bridge to nowhere. The U.S. Congress slashed funding in 2005, and permanently cancelled the project in 2015.

== Demographics ==
Historical population
Census	Pop.	Note	%±
1940	56		—
U.S. Decennial Census

Gravina Island first appeared on the 1940 U.S. Census as an unincorporated area. This was the only time it appeared on the census as a separate community.

== Flora and fauna ==
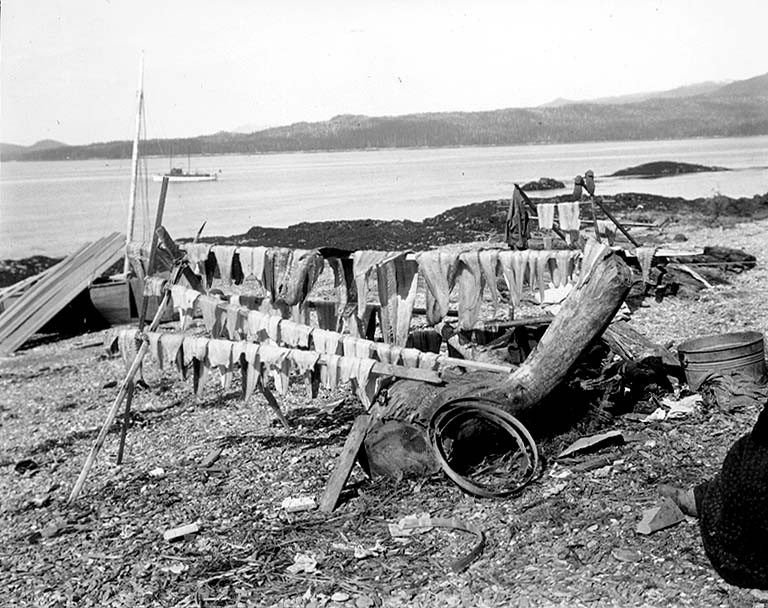
Camping site of king salmon trollers at Vallenar Point, 1902

A variety of wildlife and vegetation are found on Gravina Island including a disjunctive population of the Crater Lake Newt, a subspecies of the Rough-skinned Newt, whose northern range is in Alaska.

== Proposed bridge ==
In 2002, it was proposed that a for-profit prison corporation, Cornell Corrections, build a prison on the island. To connect the island with Ketchikan, it was originally planned that the federal government spend $175 million on building a bridge to the island, and another $75 million to connect it to the power grid with an electrical intertie. The Ketchikan Borough Assembly turned the proposal down when the administration of Governor Tony Knowles also expressed its disfavor to the idea. Eventually, the corporation's prison plans led to the exposure of the wide-ranging Alaska political corruption probe, which eventually ensnared U.S. Senator Ted Stevens. The bridge idea persisted. The 2005 Highway Bill provided for $223 million to build the Gravina Island Bridge between Gravina Island and nearby Ketchikan, on Revillagigedo Island. The provisions and earmarks were negotiated by Alaska's Rep. Don Young, who chaired the House Transportation Committee and were supported by the Chair of the Senate Appropriations Committee, Alaska's Senator Stevens. This bridge, nicknamed "The Bridge to Nowhere" by critics, was intended to replace the auto ferry which is currently the only connection between Ketchikan and its airport. While the federal earmark was withdrawn after meeting opposition from Oklahoma Senator Tom Coburn, though the state of Alaska received $300 million in transportation funding, the state of Alaska continued to study improvements in access to the airport, which could conceivably include improvements to the ferry service. Despite the demise of the bridge proposal, Governor Sarah Palin spent $26 million in transportation funding for the planned access road on Gravina Island that ultimately had little use.
