= Don Young Day =

Public holiday in Alaska

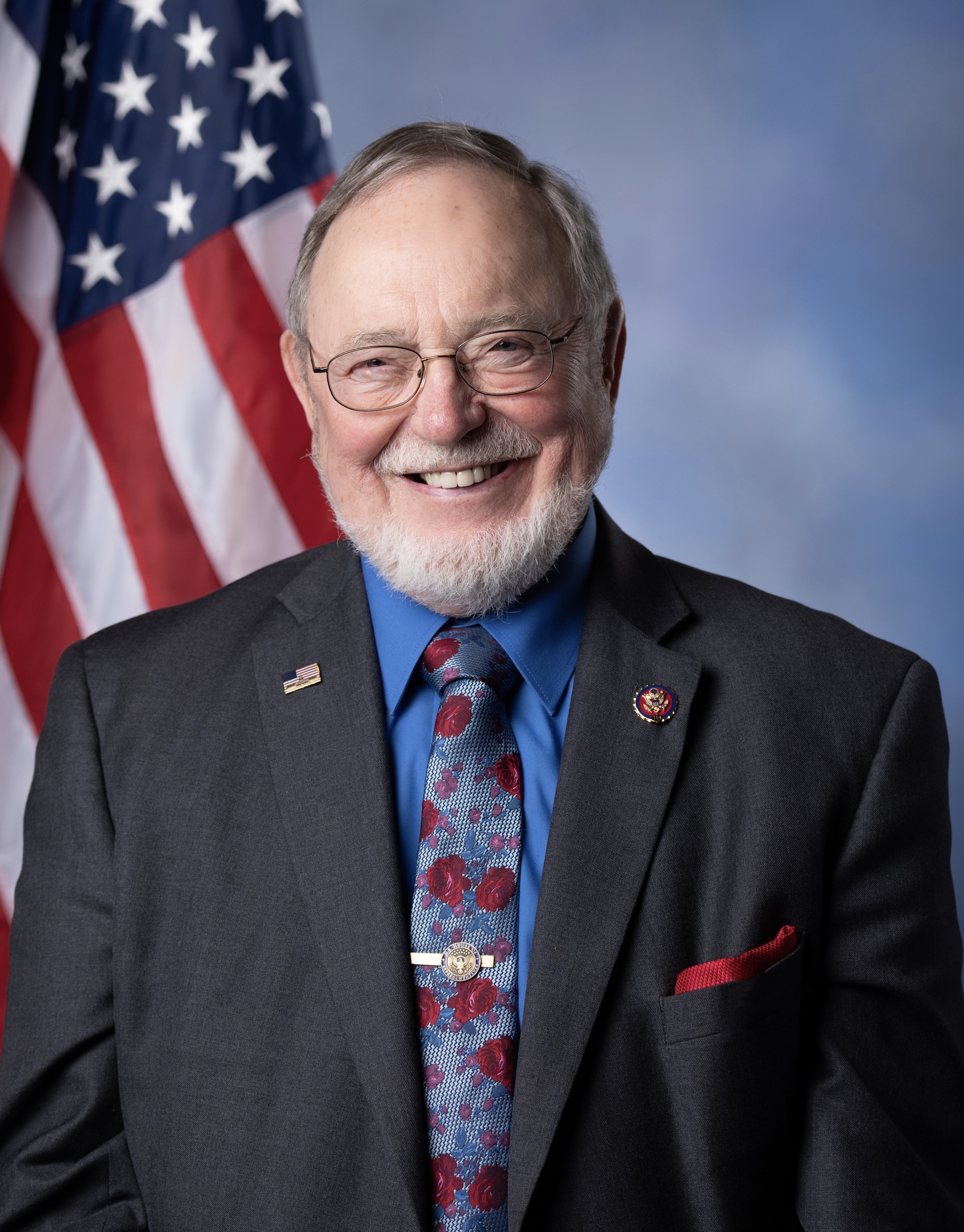
- Don Young in 2020
- Observed by: Alaska
- Date: June 9
- Frequency: Annual

Don Young Day is a day of recognition in the state of Alaska, observed annually on June 9, commemorating Don Young, who served as a member of Alaska's at-large congressional district in the U.S. House of Representatives from March 6, 1973, until his death on March 18, 2022, at the age of 88, making him the longest-serving Republican member of Congress in U.S. history.

== History ==
Don Young was first elected to Congress in a 1973 special election to fill the seat of Representative Nick Begich, who had been presumed dead following his disappearance in a 1972 plane crash. Young would go on to be re-elected to 24 full terms, becoming the Dean of the House in December 2017. He died in office on March 18, 2022, while flying from Los Angeles to Seattle on his way back to Alaska.

Young lay in state in the U.S. Capitol's National Statuary Hall on March 29, 2022, before his memorial service. He was the 43rd person to have this honor since 1852.

On March 18, 2023, the one year anniversary of Young's death, Alaska Governor Mike Dunleavy issued a proclamation declaring that day to be Don Young Day, encouraging "all Alaskans to celebrate and honor the contributions of Congressman Don Young through his lifetime of service to the State of Alaska and to the United States of America." On March 27, State Representative Craig Johnson introduced House Bill 141, to commemorate Don Young Day each year on June 9, Young's birthday. The bill passed the House and Senate, respectively, on April 20 and May 16, and was signed into law by Governor Dunleavy on August 26. Rather than create a new public holiday, the bill establishes Don Young Day to "be observed by suitable observances and exercises by civil groups and the public."

== Legislative history ==
Session	Short description	Synopsis as introduced	Bill number	Date introduced	Senate	Assembly	Governor	Sponsor
33rd	Don Young Day	An Act establishing June 9 of each year as Don Young Day.	HB 0141	March 27, 2023	Passed the House 35–2	Passed the Senate 20–0	Signed into Law by the Governor on August 26, 2023	Representative Craig Johnson
