= Harry Newell (fireboat) =

High-speed fireboat operating in Alaska, US

History
- Name: Harry Newell
- Namesake: Harry Newell
- Commissioned: August 1986
- Home port: Ketchikan, Alaska

General characteristics
- Type: Fireboat
- Length: 45 feet (14 m)
- Installed power: 410 HP (310 kW)
- Propulsion: diesel engines
- Speed: 30 knots (56 km/h)

Harry Newell is a highspeed fireboat operated out of Ketchikan, Alaska, since August 1986. She is built of aluminum, is 45 feet (14 m) long, is propelled by a pair of 410 brake horsepower (310 kW) diesel engines, at up to 30 knots (56 km/h). Her pumps can throw 5,000 US gallons (19,000 L; 4,200 imp gal) per minute through four water cannons.

She replaced a wooden fireboat with a pumping capacity of 4,000 US gallons (15,000 L; 3,300 imp gal) per minute. Ketchikan is built on a narrow strip of low-lying land that back on to mountains. Locals say the city is "five miles long and two blocks wide," which means much of it is within range of a fireboat's pumps. The vessel is named after Harry Newell, a Ketchikan firefighter who died in the line of duty in 1955. He was the first and only Ketchikan firefighter to die on duty. Harry Newell was held in reserve when the fishing vessel Sable had a fire, at her moorings, on January 25, 2010. Early on the morning of October 18, 2016, a fire was detected in a dwelling on Gravina Island. The Harry Newell responded. Firefighters were unable to save the building, but prevented the fire spreading.
