= Transit for Livable Communities =

- Formation: 1996
- Type: Advocacy group
- Headquarters: St. Paul, Minnesota, United States
- Members: 10,000
- Executive Director: Jessica Treat
- Website: tlcminnesota.org

Transit for Livable Communities (TLC) is a regional, nonpartisan transit, biking, walking, and development advocacy group based in St. Paul, Minnesota, USA. It was founded in 1996 by Barb Thoman and John DeWitt.

== Mission statement ==
Transit for Livable Communities is a non-profit organization that works to improve the quality of life in Minnesota communities through a balanced transportation system that encourages transit, walking, biking, and transit-oriented development. Transit for Livable Communities was founded in 1996 and is funded through private donations and foundation grants.

== Initiatives ==
=== Transportation Choices 2020 ===
Since 2004, Transit for Livable Communities has headed a coalition of ten organizations (including itself), known as the "Transit Partners" to lobby the Minnesota State Legislature to pass the Transportation Choices 2020 initiative. According to the Transit for Livable Communities website, the initiative intends to "provide funding to dramatically expand the availability of public transit and facilities for bicycling and walking in Minnesota." The initiative specifically intends to double bus service by 2020, create better transit facilities and new Park & Ride capacity, construct eight dedicated bus and rail transitways by 2020, and provide revenue to local governments for transit, bicycle & pedestrian projects.

==== Transit Partners ====
1. Alliance for Metropolitan Stability
2. Amalgamated Transit Union
3. Fresh Energy
4. ISAIAH
5. League of Women Voters
6. Minnesota Center for Environmental Advocacy
7. Minnesota Public Transit Association
8. Senior Federation
9. Sierra Club
10. Transit for Livable Communities

=== Bike/Walk Twin Cities ===
Transit for Livable Communities is administering the Nonmotorized Transportation Pilot Program (NTP) for the Twin Cities. TLC has named this project Bike/Walk Twin Cities. NTP was established in 2005 as part of the six-year federal transportation law known as SAFETEA-LU. The law provides $21.5 million to four communities nationwide to evaluate how investments in planning, infrastructure, and public education can increase rates of bicycling and walking and reduce driving. The four pilot communities include Minneapolis and its adjoining communities; Sheboygan County, Wisconsin; Marin County, California; and Columbia, Missouri.

=== Move Minnesota ===
On January 1, 2017, Transit for Livable Communities merged with St. Paul Smart Trips to form Move Minnesota.
