= Earmark (politics) =

Discretionary spending provision

An earmark is a provision inserted into a discretionary spending appropriations bill that directs funds to a specific recipient while circumventing the merit-based or competitive funds allocation process. Earmarks feature in United States Congress spending policy, and they are present in public finance of many other countries as a form of political particularism.

== Etymology ==
"Earmark" comes from the livestock term, where the ears of domestic animals were cut in specific ways so that farmers could distinguish their stock from others grazing on public land. In particular, the term comes from earmarked hogs where, by analogy, pork-barreled legislation would be doled out among members of the local political machine.

== Definitions ==
In 2006 the Congressional Research Service (CRS) compiled a report on the use of earmarks in thirteen Appropriation Acts from 1994 through 2005 in which they noted that there was "not a single definition of the term earmark accepted by all practitioners and observers of the appropriations process, nor [was] there a standard earmark practice across all appropriation bills." It was noted at that time, that while the CRS did not summarize earmarks that they came in two varieties: hard earmarks, or "hardmarks", found in legislation, and soft earmarks, or "softmarks", found in the text of congressional committee reports. Hard earmarks are legally binding, whereas soft earmarks are not but are customarily acted upon as if they were. The CRS did not aggregate the "varying definitions" as the result would be invalid.

By 2006, the definition most widely used, developed by the Congressional Research Service, the public policy research arm of the U.S. Congress was,

"Provisions associated with legislation (appropriations or general legislation) that specify certain congressional spending priorities or in revenue bills that apply to a very limited number of individuals or entities. Earmarks may appear in either the legislative text or report language (committee reports accompanying reported bills and joint explanatory statement accompanying a conference report)."

— Sandy Streeter, Government and Finance Division, March 6, 2006 CRS

According to the federal Office of Management and Budget the term earmark referred to,

"funds provided by the Congress for projects, programs, or grants where the purported congressional direction (whether in statutory text, report language, or other communication) circumvents otherwise applicable merit-based or competitive allocation processes, or specifies the location or recipient, or otherwise curtails the ability of the executive branch to manage its statutory and constitutional responsibilities pertaining to the funds allocation process. Earmarks are funds provided by Congress for projects or programs that curtail the ability of the Executive Branch to manage critical aspects of the funds allocation process."

— Office of Management and Budget. Last updated 2011

As recently as January 2023, clause 9(e) of rule XXI of the Rules of the House of Representatives for the 118th Congress states that the term "congressional earmark" means,

"a provision or report language included primarily at the request of a Member, Delegate, Resident Commissioner, or Senator providing, authorizing or recommending a specific amount of discretionary budget authority, credit authority, or other spending authority for a contract, loan, loan guarantee, grant, loan authority, or other expenditure with or to an entity, or targeted to a specific State, locality or Congressional district, other than through a statutory or administrative formula-driven or competitive award process."

— Clerk of the House of Representatives January 10, 2023

The House Rules impose disclosure requirements for earmarks, while a standing rule of the Republican Conference has, since the 114th Congress, imposed an "earmark moratorium".

Typically, a legislator seeks to insert earmarks that direct a specified amount of money to a particular organization or project in their home state or district.

== US Congress Appropriation committees ==
The two most powerful Congressional committees, the Senate Committee on Appropriations and the House Committee on Appropriations, pass bills that regulate expenditures of the United States federal government. Chairs and Members of these committees are seen as influential. The Senate Appropriations Committee is the largest committee in the U.S. Senate, with 30 members in the 114th Congress and is, therefore one of the most powerful committees in the Senate. In 2006 the two committees controlled $843 billion a year in discretionary spending in 2006 and earmarked tens of billions of dollars that year.

== Value ==
The 2006 CRS report compared the value of earmarks from 1994 to 2005.

	Total $ billion		% of total federal outlay	
Year	CAGW	CRS	CAGW	CRS
1994	$7.8	$23.2	0.004%	1.59%
1996	$12.5	$19.5	0.80%	1.25%
1998	$13.2	$27.7	0.80%	1.67%
2000	$17.7	$32.9	0.99%	1.84%
2002	$20.1	$42.0	1.00%	2.09%
2004	$22.9	$45.0	1.00%	1.96%
2005	$27.3	$47.4	1.10%	1.92%

== Legislation ==
Congress is required by Article 1, Section 9, Clause 7 of the United States Constitution to pass legislation prior to the expenditure of any U.S. Treasury funds.

The earmarking process provided Congress with the power to earmark discretionary funds it appropriates to be spent on specific named projects. The earmarking process was a regular part of the process of allocating funds within the Federal government. For many years they were a core aspect of legislative policymaking and distributive politics - an essential political instrument whereby political coalitions were forged through compromise in order to pass or reject key legislation. As congressional earmarks came into disfavor and eventually were prohibited, the ban "contributed to legislative gridlock and increased the difficulty of winning enactment of tax and immigration reform."

Earmarking differs from the broader appropriations process in which Congress grants a yearly lump sum of money to a federal agency. These monies are allocated by the agency according to its legal authority, the terms of the annual authorization bill passed by Congress and internal budgeting process. With an earmark, Congress directs a specified amount of money from part of an agency's authorized budget to be spent on a particular project. In the past members of Congress did not have to identify themselves or the project.

The process of earmarking was substantially reformed since the 110th United States Congress between January 3, 2007, and January 3, 2009. Since 2009, members of Congress had to post all their earmark requests online along with a signed letter certifying that they and their immediate families had no direct financial interest in the earmark.

In March 2010, the House Appropriations Committee implemented rules to ban earmarks to for-profit corporations. Approximately 1,000 such earmarks were authorized in the previous year, worth $1.7 billion. At the time, earmarks constituted less than 1% of the 2010 federal budget, down from about 1.1% in 2006.

After gaining control of the House in 2011 (following the 2010 elections), Republicans adopted a House earmark ban. This was controversial within the House Republican Conference, which had internal debates several times over whether to partially lift the ban. The earmark ban is contained in the House Republicans' intraparty rules (not the House rules).

President Obama promised during his State of the Union address in January 2011 to veto any bill that contained earmarks. In February 2011, Congress "imposed a temporary ban on earmarks, money for projects that individual lawmakers slip into major Congressional budget bills to cater to local demands."

In December 2015, Citizens Against Government Waste (CAGW) claimed in their 2016 Congressional Pig Book, that all the FY2016 earmarks were contained in the December 2016 omnibus 2000-page Consolidated Appropriations Act, 2016 which authorized $1.15 trillion in appropriations. The CAGW argued that "Throwing all earmarks into one large bill makes it more difficult to identify and eliminate earmarks than if Congress adhered to regular order and considered the 12 appropriations bills individually."

== Alternatives to congressional earmarks ==
Members of Congress can influence priorities and policy-making that promote projects that are important to their constituents by accessing discretionary DOT spending, through regular formula-based funding mechanisms and increased interaction with both transportation official as the federal and state levels.

== Earmarks and transportation ==
In January 2017, a report by the CRS described how, prior to the earmarks ban in 2011, Members of Congress had used earmarks to ensure that local congressional representatives, not the Department of Transportation and its Agencies Administration, set priority discretionary transportation spending.

Congressional members and DOT administration often disagree on priorities. In FY2007, with an earmark ban in place, the Bush administration divided about $850 million, which represented almost all of the DOT's discretionary annual funding, to traffic congestion mitigation strategies in only five metro areas, Miami, Florida, Minneapolis, Minnesota, San Francisco, California, and Seattle, Washington through the Urban Partnership Agreement.

== Debates ==
Earmarks have often been treated as being synonymous with "pork barrel" legislation. Despite considerable overlap, the two are not the same: what constitutes an earmark is an objective determination, while what is "pork-barrel" spending is subjective. One legislator's "pork" is another's vital project.

Scott Frisch and Sean Kelly point out that directing money to particular purposes is a core constitutional function of Congress. If Congress does not make a specific allocation, the task falls to the executive branch. There is no guarantee that the allocation made by executive agencies will be superior to that of Congress. Presidents and executive officials can use the allocation of spending to reward friends and punish enemies.

There are also those who opine that earmarks are good because they are more democratic and less bureaucratic than traditional appropriation spending, which generally is not tailored to specific projects.

== In popular culture ==
The Gravina Island Bridge, popularly known as the "Bridge to Nowhere", has become shorthand for frivolous earmarks. In 2002, it was proposed that a for-profit prison corporation, Cornell Corrections, build a prison on the island. To connect the island with Ketchikan, it was originally planned that the federal government spend $175 million on building a bridge to the island, and another $75M to connect it to the power grid with an electrical intertie. The Ketchikan Borough Assembly turned the proposal down when the administration of Governor Tony Knowles also expressed its disfavor to the idea. Eventually, the corporation's prison plans led to the exposure of the wide-ranging Alaska political corruption probe, which eventually ensnared U.S. Senator Ted Stevens.

The bridge idea persisted. The 2005 Highway Bill provided for $223M to build the Gravina Island Bridge between Gravina Island and nearby Ketchikan, on Revillagigedo Island. The provisions and earmarks were negotiated by Alaska's Rep. Don Young, who chaired the House Transportation Committee and were supported by the Chair of the Senate Appropriations Committee, Alaska's Senator Stevens. This bridge, nicknamed "The Bridge to Nowhere" by critics, was intended to replace the auto ferry which is currently the only connection between Ketchikan and its airport.

However, the federal earmark was withdrawn after meeting opposition from Oklahoma Senator Tom Coburn, but only after the state of Alaska received $300M in transportation funding. The state continued to study improvements in access to the airport, which could conceivably include improvements to the ferry service. Despite the demise of the bridge proposal, Governor Sarah Palin spent $26M in transportation funding for constructing the planned access road on the island that ultimately served little use.

== See also ==
- Expenditures in the United States federal budget
- Mandatory spending
- Appropriations bill (United States)
- Client politics
- Federal Funding Accountability and Transparency Act of 2006
- Lobbying
- Hypothecated tax
- Local and personal Acts of Parliament (United Kingdom)
