= Don Young =

American politician (1933–2022)

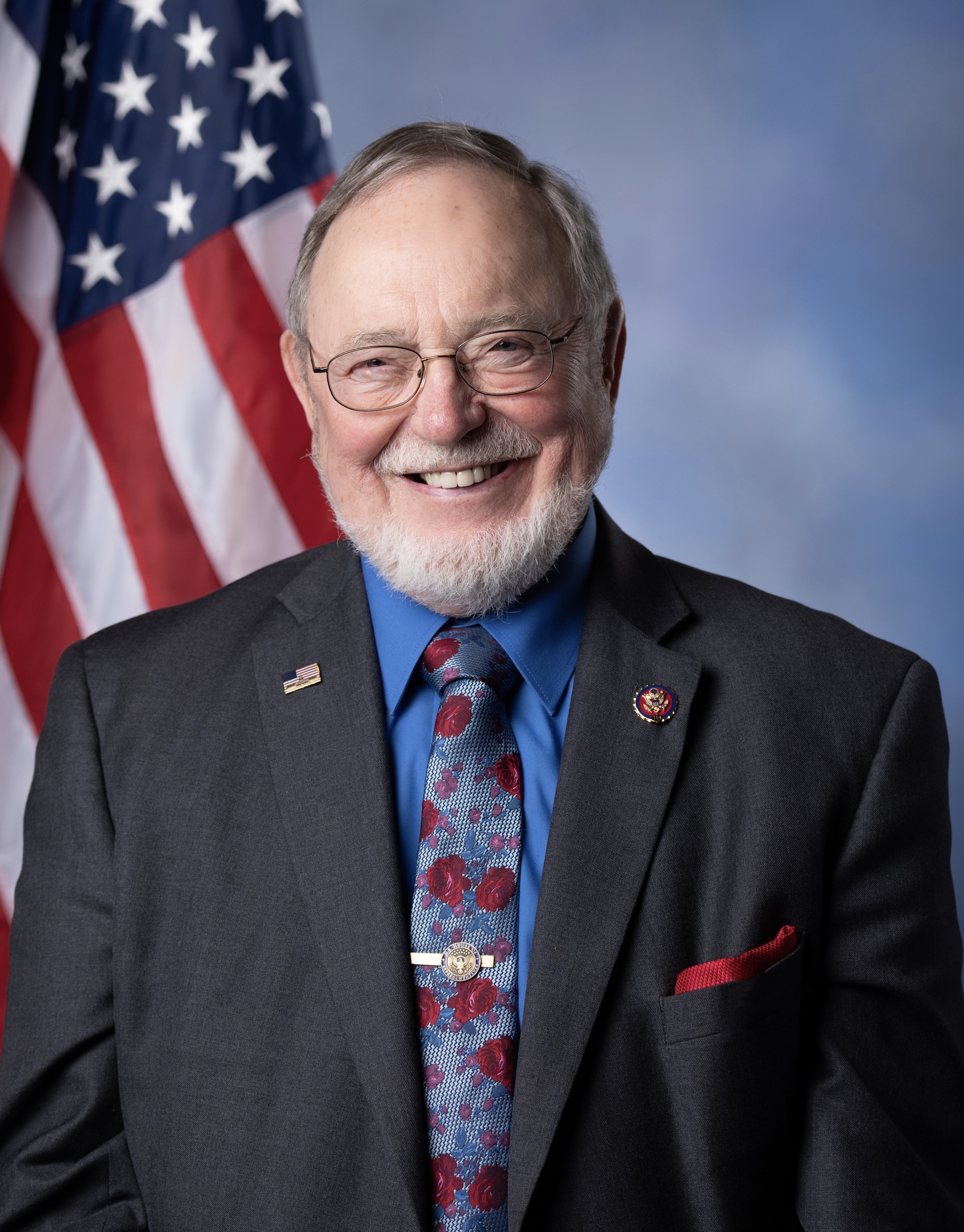
- Official portrait, 2020

45th Dean of the United States House of Representatives
- In office December 5, 2017 – March 18, 2022
- Preceded by: John Conyers
- Succeeded by: Hal Rogers

Member of the U.S. House of Representatives from Alaska's at-large district
- In office March 6, 1973 – March 18, 2022
- Preceded by: Nick Begich Sr.
- Succeeded by: Mary Peltola
Committee chairmanships
Chair of the House Transportation Committee
In office January 3, 2001 – January 3, 2007
Preceded by	Bud Shuster
Succeeded by	Jim Oberstar
Chair of the House Resources Committee
In office January 3, 1995 – January 3, 2001
Preceded by	George Miller
Succeeded by	James V. Hansen

Member of the Alaska Senate from the I district
- In office January 11, 1971 – March 6, 1973
- Preceded by: Paul Haggland
- Succeeded by: George Silides

Member of the Alaska House of Representatives from the 16th district
- In office January 3, 1967 – January 3, 1971
- Preceded by: Multi-member district
- Succeeded by: Multi-member district

Personal details
- Born: Donald Edwin Young; June 9, 1933 Meridian, California, U.S.
- Died: March 18, 2022 (aged 88) SeaTac, Washington, U.S.
- Party: Republican
- Spouses: Lu Fredson (m. 1963; died 2009) Anne Garland Walton (m. 2015)
- Children: 2
- Education: Yuba College; California State University, Chico (BA)

Military service
- Allegiance: United States
- Branch/service: United States Army
- Years of service: 1955–1957
- Unit: 41st Tank Battalion
- Don Young's voice Young, as chair of the House Transportation Committee, speaks in support of SAFETEA-LU. Recorded March 9, 2005

Donald Edwin Young (June 9, 1933 – March 18, 2022) was an American politician from Alaska. He was the longest-serving Republican in House history, having been the U.S. representative for the state's at-large congressional district for 49 years, from 1973 until his death in 2022.

Born and raised in California, Young moved to Alaska in 1959 after a stint in the U.S. Army. He worked various careers, including sailing and teaching, in the small city of Fort Yukon, where he was elected mayor in 1964. He entered state politics two years later, when he won a seat in the Alaska House of Representatives, and advanced to the Alaska Senate in 1970. In 1972, he ran for a seat in the House of Representatives against incumbent Democrat Nick Begich. Weeks before the election, Begich disappeared and was presumed dead in a plane crash, though he still (likely posthumously) won the vote. Young ran in a special election to fill the vacant post the following year, defeating Democrat Emil Notti. He was re-elected to the seat 24 times.

In Congress, Young chaired the House Resources Committee from 1995 to 2001 and the House Transportation Committee from 2001 to 2007. The Associated Press said that he was known for his "brusque" and "off-color" demeanor, and The New York Times described him as having "cultivated the image of a rugged frontiersman"; his prominent personality, long tenure, and position as his state's sole House member led to him occasionally being dubbed "Alaska's third senator".

Young became the 45th dean of the United States House of Representatives in December 2017, after John Conyers resigned. He was the first Republican in that office in more than 84 years.

== Early life, education, and teaching career ==
Donald Edwin Young was born on June 9, 1933, in Meridian, Sutter County, California, the second of three sons of Russell Lawhead "Cy" Young Sr. and Arlene Marcella Bucy. He earned an associate's degree in education from Yuba College in 1952 and a bachelor's degree from Chico State College in 1958. He served in the Army from 1955 to 1957.

Young moved to Alaska in 1959, not long after it became a state. He settled in Fort Yukon, then a village of 700 on the Yukon River, seven miles above the Arctic Circle in Alaska's central interior region. He made a living in construction, fishing, trapping, and gold mining. He captained a tugboat and ran a barge operation to deliver products and supplies to villages along the Yukon River. At the time of his death, Young still held his mariner's license. During winters, he taught fifth grade at the local Bureau of Indian Affairs elementary school.

== Early political career ==
Young's political career began in 1964, when he was elected mayor of Fort Yukon, serving until 1968. He ran for the Alaska House of Representatives in 1964, but finished tenth, with the top seven candidates being elected for the multi-member district.

He was elected to the State House in 1966 and reelected in 1968. Young served in the Alaska House of Representatives from 1967 to 1971.

He said he "loved" the job before he "got ambitious" and ran for the Alaska Senate in 1970. He served in the Alaska Senate from 1971 to 1973. He was elected to the two-member District I alongside long-serving Republican State Senator John Butrovich. He said he "hated" the state senate. After encouragement from his first wife, he ran for Congress in 1972.

== U.S. House of Representatives ==
=== Elections ===
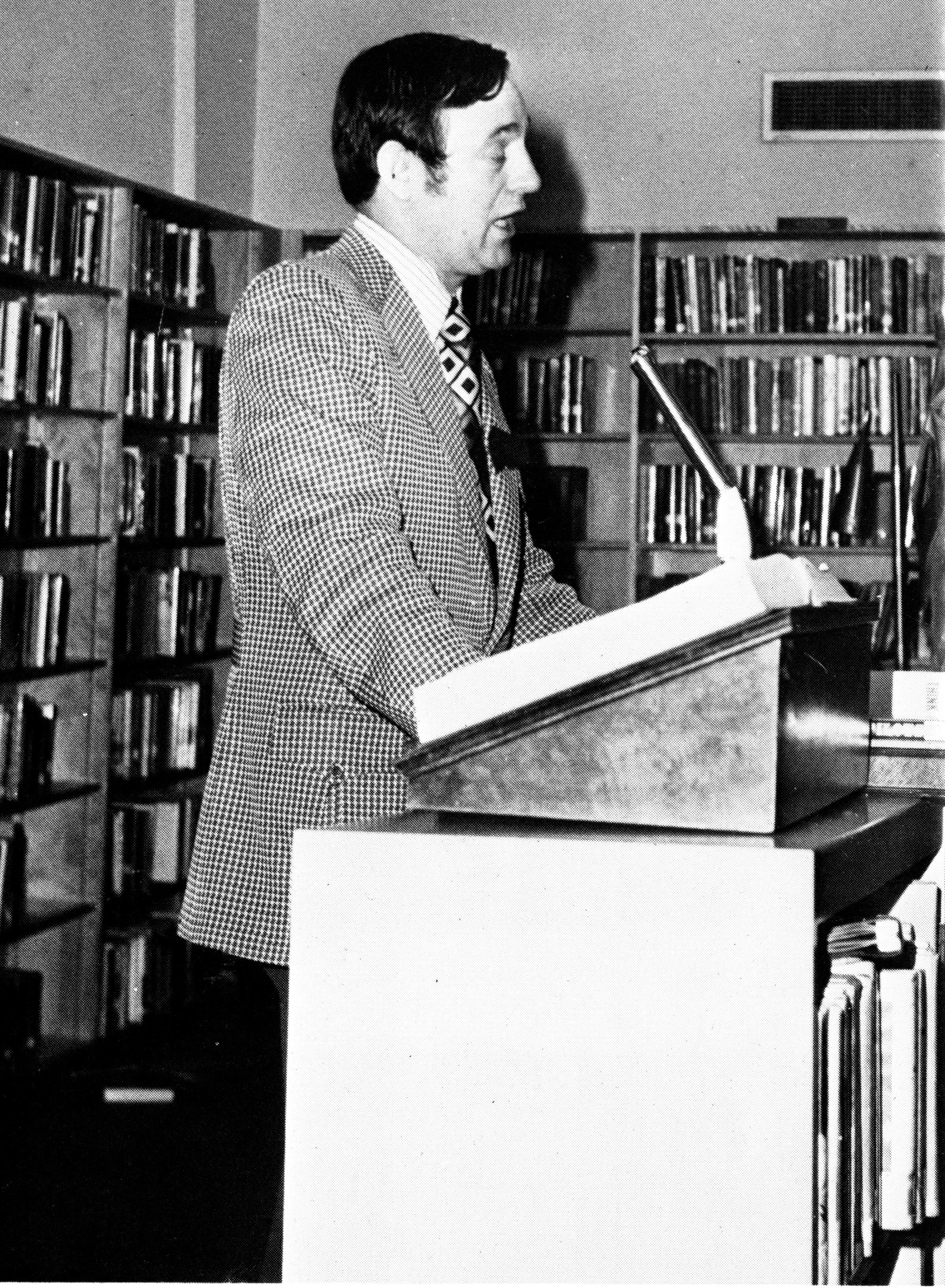
Young speaking at the Juneau-Douglas High School library during the 1972–1973 school year

In 1972, Young ran for Congress against incumbent Democrat Nick Begich. Weeks before the election, Begich and Representative Hale Boggs died in a plane crash, but Begich's name remained on the ballot and he won the election. Begich's body was never found, and he was declared legally dead in December 1972.

Young won the resulting special election to fill the seat in March 1973. He was reelected 24 times, usually without significant opposition, although he faced strong challenges in the 2008 primary election and in the 1974, 1990, and 1992 elections.

He won his 2016 primary with more than 70% of the vote, and defeated Democrat Steve Lindbeck and Libertarian Jim McDermott in the general election with 50% of the vote to win his 23rd term in office. Young won again in 2018, against candidate Alyse Galvin, whose party was undeclared, taking 52.6% of the vote.

Young was the most senior U.S. representative and, after Jim Sensenbrenner retired, the last member who had been in office since the 1970s. He was the second-highest-ranking Republican on the Natural Resources and Transportation and Infrastructure committees. He chaired the former from 1995 to 2001 and the latter from 2001 to 2007.

Young was the subject of an extensive FBI investigation but was not charged with wrongdoing. He was subsequently the subject of a House Ethics Committee probe.

==== 1972–1974 ====
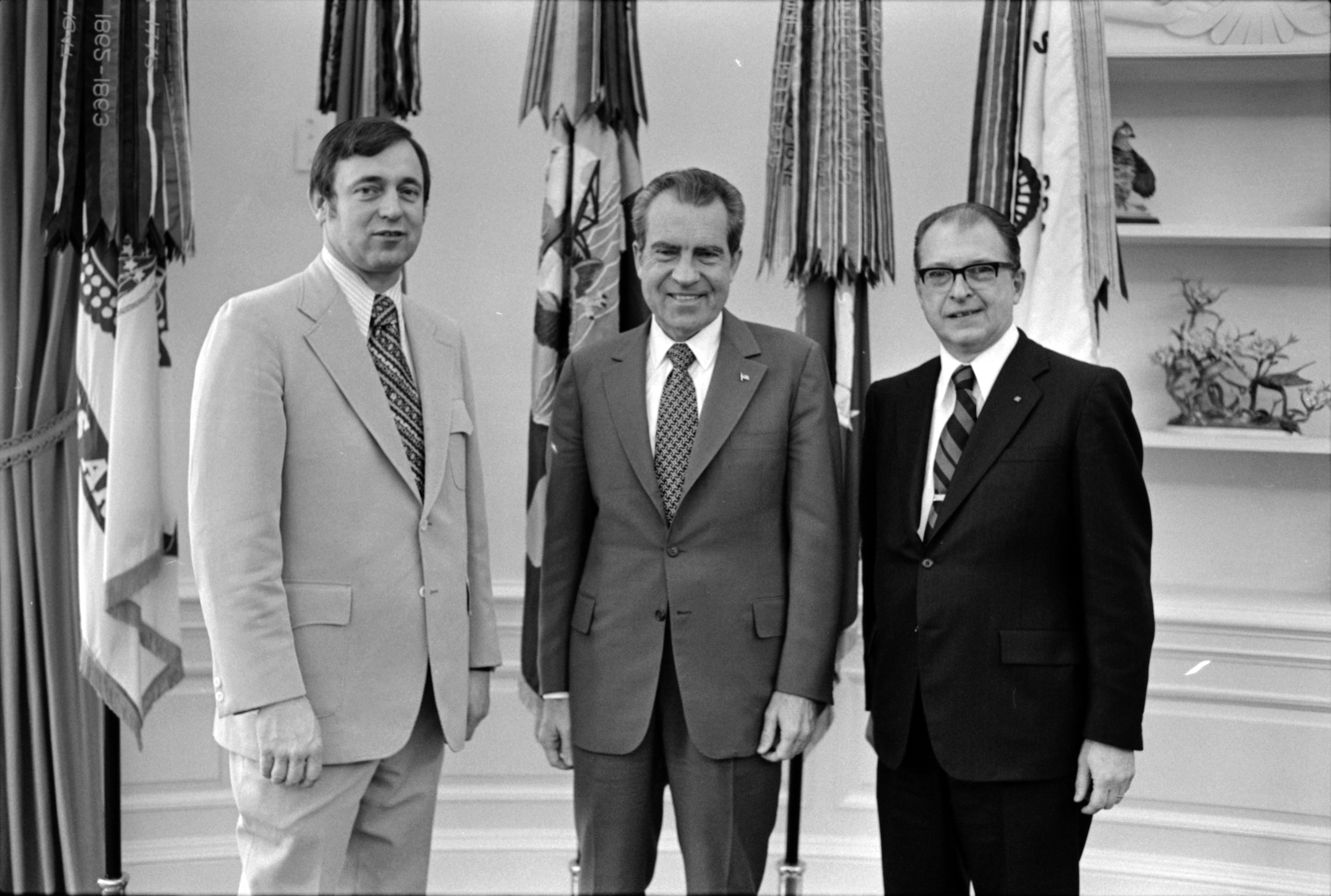
Young with President Richard Nixon and Jack Coghill in 1973

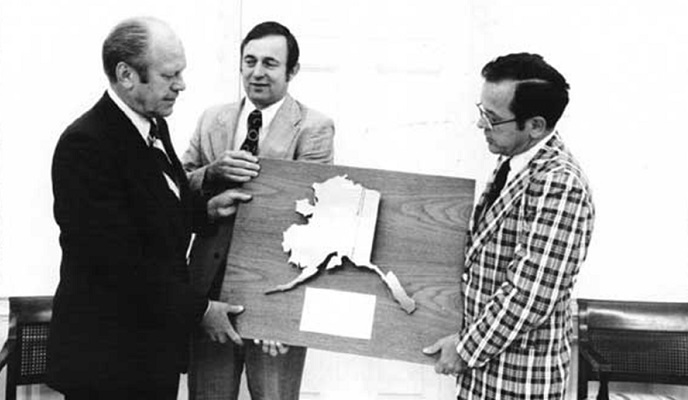
Young with President Gerald Ford and U.S. Senator Ted Stevens in 1975

Democratic State Senator Nick Begich was elected to the House of Representatives in 1970 to succeed Republican Howard Pollock, who ran unsuccessfully for the Republican nomination for governor of Alaska. Young ran against Begich in 1972 and placed second in the August 22 open primary with 13,958 votes (25.60%) to Begich's 37,873 (69.45%). Begich was lost in a plane crash on October 16, 1972 (along with House Majority Leader Hale Boggs of Louisiana), 22 days before the general election. Although his body was never found, Begich won the general election with 53,651 votes (56.24%) to Young's 41,750 (43.76%). He was declared dead on December 29.

Young ran in the special election on March 6, 1973, and defeated Democrat Emil Notti, 35,044 votes (51.41%) to 33,123 (48.59%). He won a full term in 1974 with 51,641 votes (53.84%) to Democratic State Senator Willie Hensley's 44,280 (46.16%). He was sworn into the House of Representatives on March 14, 1973. He credited his victory to his leadership of the fight for the Trans-Alaskan Pipeline System.

==== 1976–2006 ====
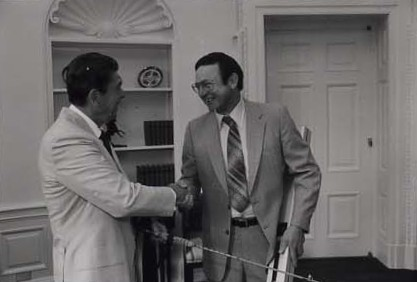
Young greeting President Ronald Reagan in 1981

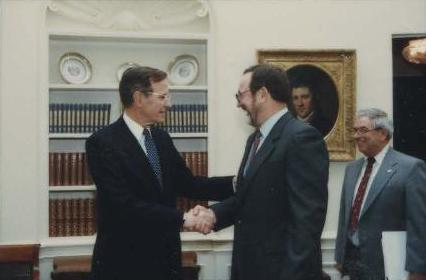
Young greeting President George H. W. Bush in 1991

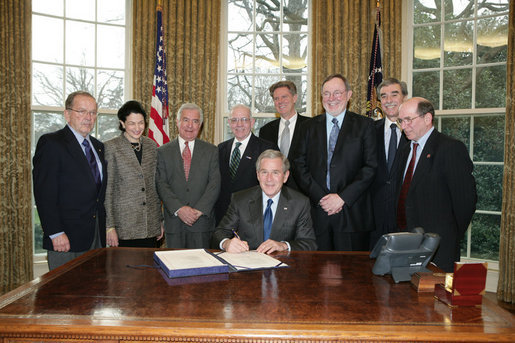
Young watches as President George W. Bush signs the Magnuson–Stevens Fishery Conservation and Management Reauthorization Act of 2006.

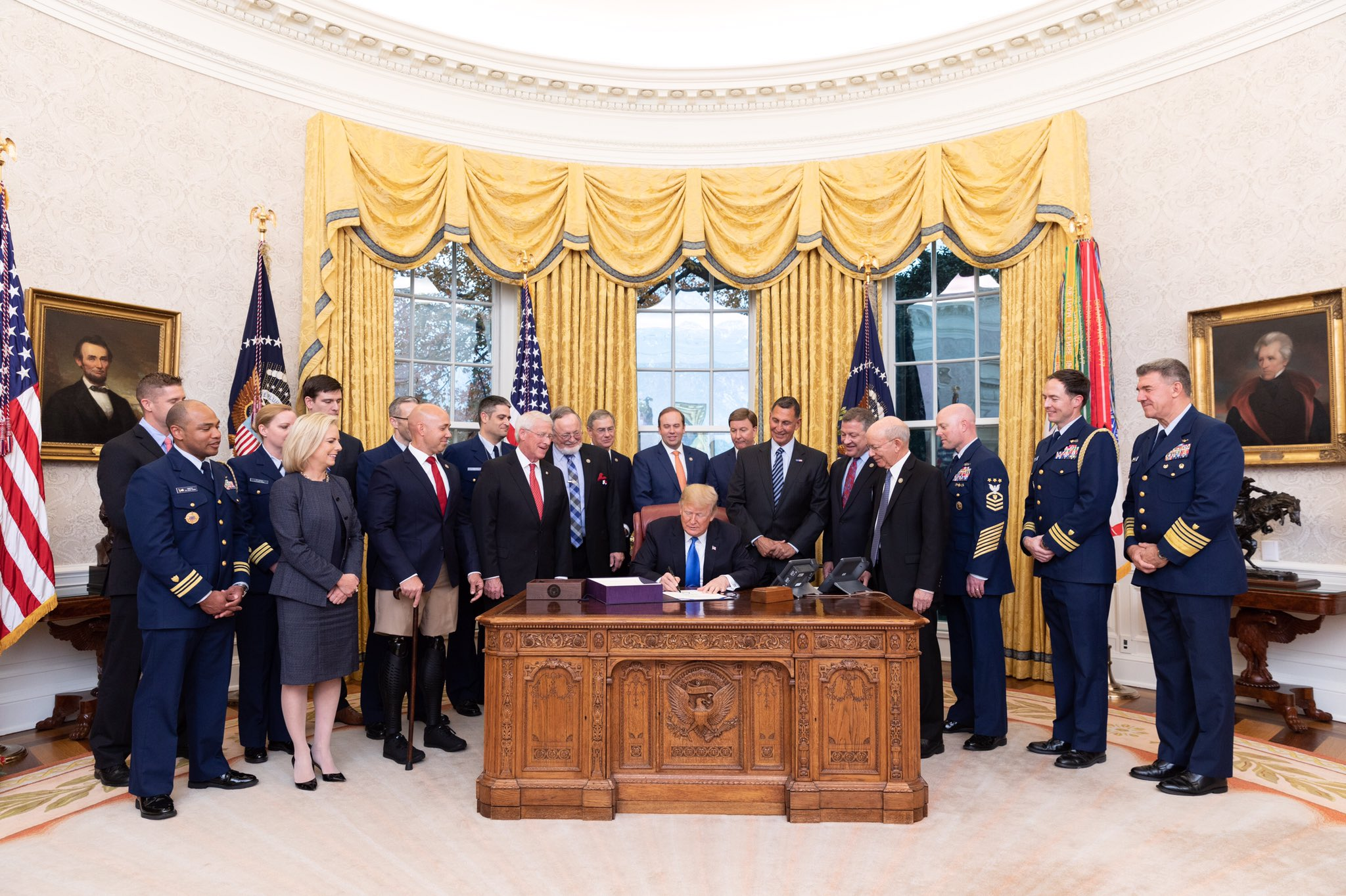
Young watches as President Donald Trump signs The Frank LoBiondo Coast Guard Authorization Act of 2018.

Young was reelected with at least 55% of the vote in each of the next seven elections. He defeated former State Senator Eben Hopson with 71% of the vote in 1976, State Senator Patrick Rodey with 55.4% of the vote in 1978, Kevin "Pat" Parnell with 73.8% of the vote in 1980, and Dave Carlson with 70.8% of the vote in 1982.

In 1984 and 1986, Young defeated Nick Begich's widow, Pegge Begich, 113,582 votes (55.02%) to 86,052 (41.68%), and 101,799 votes (56.47%) to 74,053 (41.08%), respectively. He defeated Peter Gruenstein with 62.5% of the vote in 1988 and then faced John Devens, the mayor of Valdez, in 1990 and 1992. Young defeated him by 99,003 votes (51.66%) to 91,677 (47.84%) in 1990 and then faced a serious challenge in 1992. He was challenged in the Republican primary by State Senator Virginia M. Collins and defeated her by 24,869 votes (52.98%) to 19,774 (42.12%). In the general election, he defeated Devens, 111,849 votes (46.78%) to 102,378 (42.82%). This was both the lowest winning percentage of his career and the only time he won without a majority of the vote.

Young defeated former Alaska Commissioner of Economic Development and 1992 Democratic U.S. Senate nominee Tony Smith with 56.92% of the vote in 1994, State Senator Georgianna Lincoln with 59.41% of the vote in 1996, and State Senator and former Speaker of the Alaska House of Representatives Jim Duncan with 62.55% of the vote in 1998. He defeated attorney Clifford Mark Greene with 69.56% of the vote in 2000 and with 74.66% of the vote in 2002, the largest winning percentage of his career. He received 213,216 votes (71.34%) against Thomas Higgins in 2004, the most votes he ever received in a single election. In 2006, he defeated writer, dramatist, and video production consultant Diane E. Benson with 56.57% of the vote.

==== 2008 ====
Incumbent Lieutenant Governor Sean Parnell announced his candidacy in the August 26 Republican primary. Parnell was strongly supported by Governor Sarah Palin and the Club for Growth. Young was endorsed by Mike Huckabee's political action committee, Huck PAC, in June.

Young won by 304 votes (0.28%), and Parnell declined to seek a recount. Before the announcement of the unofficial results, both candidates had said that they would request a recount if they lost. The state of Alaska pays the costs of recounts when the difference is within a half percent, as it was in this primary election.

Young faced a challenge from Democrat Ethan Berkowitz, the 46-year-old former minority leader in the Alaska House of Representatives. Don Wright, the Alaskan Independence Party nominee, also challenged Young. Young was reelected with 50% of the vote to Berkowitz's 45% and Wright's 5%. Berkowitz conceded on November 18.

==== 2010–2020 ====
In 2010, Young ran for a 20th term. He was challenged in the Republican primary by John R. Cox and Sheldon Fisher, a former telecommunications executive, winning with 74,117 votes (70.36%). He defeated Democratic State Representative Harry Crawford in the general election, 175,384 votes (68.96%) to 77,606 (30.51%).

In 2012, Young drew two challengers in the Republican party, but defeated them with 58,789 votes (78.59%). In the general election, he defeated State Representative Sharon Cissna by 185,296 votes (63.94%) to 82,927 (28.62%).

In 2014, Young received 79,393 votes (74.29%) in the Republican primary against three challengers. In the general election, he defeated Democrat Forrest Dunbar, 142,572 votes (50.97%) to 114,602 (40.97%). Young was the only statewide incumbent in Alaska to win reelection that year, as Republican Governor Sean Parnell was defeated by Independent Bill Walker, and Democratic U.S. Senator Mark Begich was defeated by Republican Dan Sullivan.

In 2016, Young received 38,998 votes (71.5%) in the Republican primary against three challengers. In the general election, he won with 50.32% of the vote against Democratic challenger Steve Lindbeck with 36.02% and Libertarian Jim McDermott with 10.31%.

In 2018, Young defeated Alyse Galvin, an Independent candidate who had won the combined Alaska Democratic Party, Alaska Libertarian Party and Alaskan Independence Party primary. He received 53.08% of the vote to Galvin's 46.5%.

In 2020, Young ran for a 25th term. He won the Republican primary with 77% of the vote in a three-way race. In the general election, Young again defeated combined-ticket nominee Alyse Galvin with 54.4% of the vote.

=== Tenure ===
At the start of the 116th Congress, Young was the longest-serving current House member. Due to his long tenure in the House and that of former Senator Ted Stevens, Alaska was considered to have had clout in national politics far beyond its small population (it is the 4th smallest, ahead of only North Dakota, Vermont, and Wyoming). He was often called "Alaska's third senator". On March 5, 2019, he became the longest-serving Republican in congressional history, surpassing Joe Cannon.

==== 1990s ====
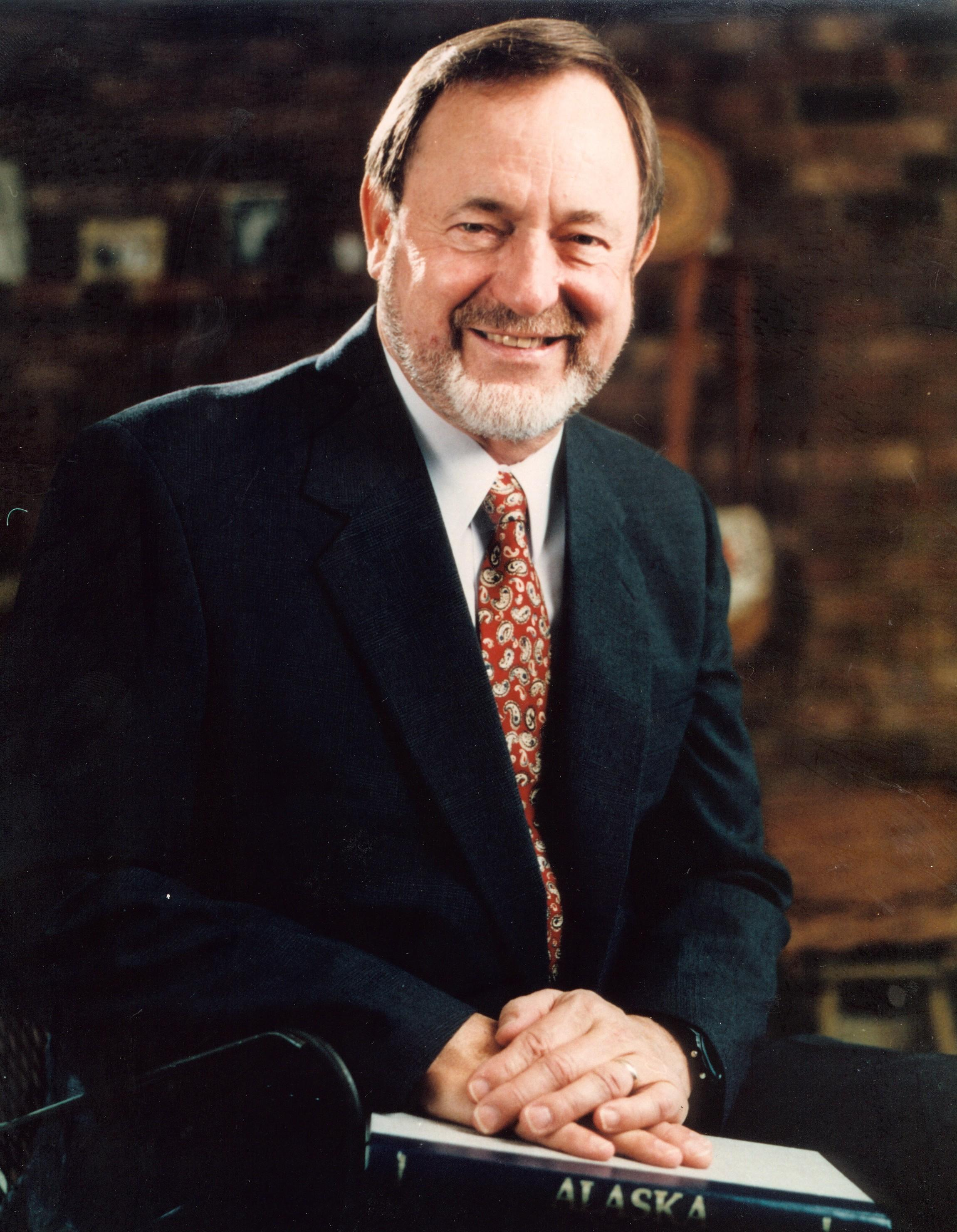
Young in the 1990s

After the 1995 Republican takeover of the House, Young chaired the Committee on Natural Resources, which he renamed the Committee on Resources. The name was changed back by Democrats in 2006 and has since been retained by Republican chairs. He chaired the committee until 2001, then chairing the Committee on Transportation and Infrastructure from 2001 to 2007.

During a 1994 House debate touching on the question of Alaska Natives' right to sell sex organs of endangered animals as aphrodisiacs, he pulled out an 18-inch penis bone of a walrus, better known as an "oosik", and brandished it like a sword on the House floor at the face of the head of the U.S. Fish and Wildlife Service.

In March 1998, Young brought a bill to the House floor allowing voters in Puerto Rico to vote on continuing its commonwealth status or becoming either a state or independent. The legislation passed by a single vote.

==== 2000–2010 ====
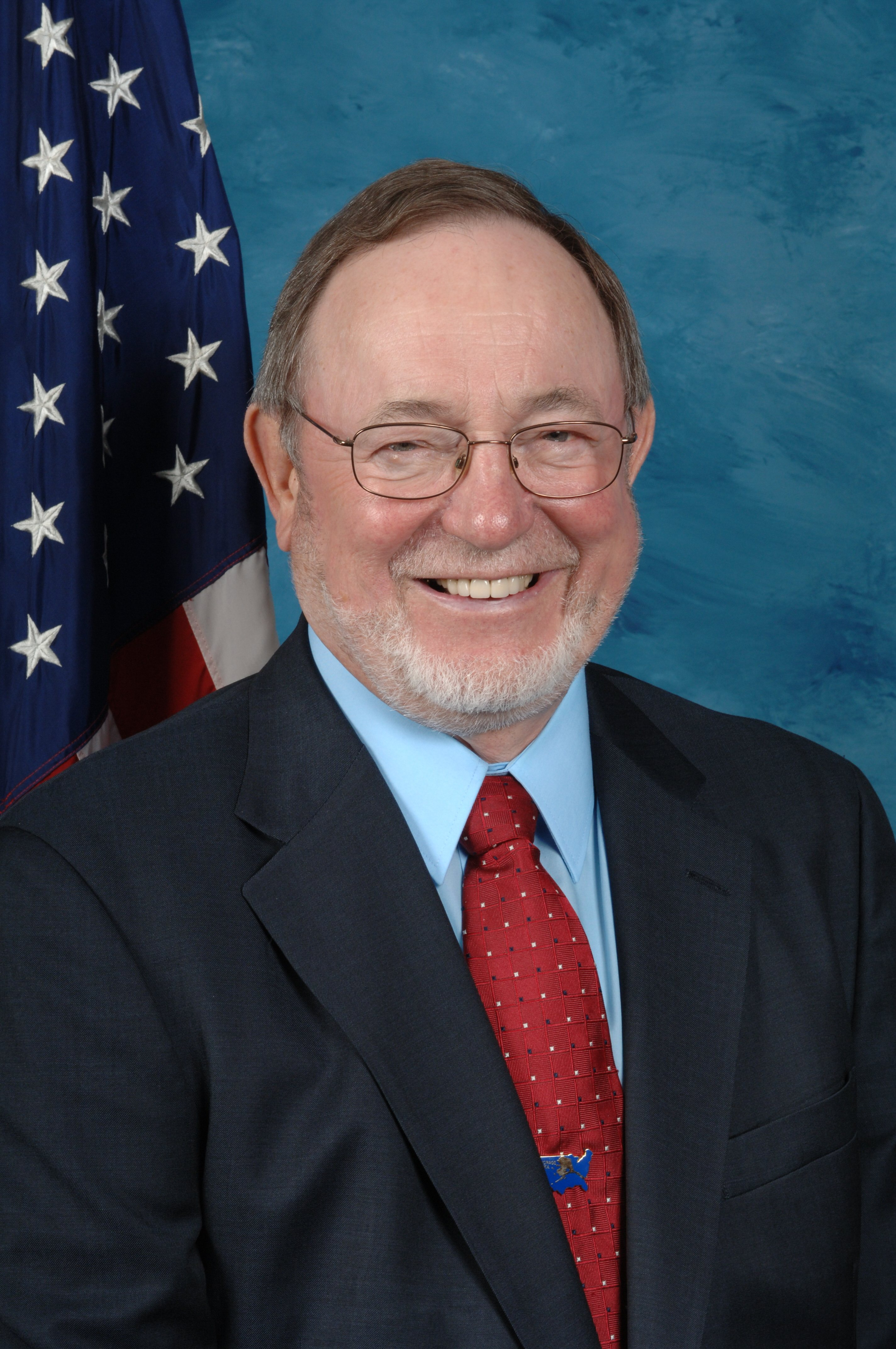
Young in 2006

In the 2005 Highway Bill, Young helped secure $941 million for 119 special projects, including a $231 million bridge in Anchorage named Don Young's Way.

In 2007, Young was investigated as a part of the Alaska political corruption probe for his ties to the oil and gas company VECO Corporation. He faced no charges.

In July 2007, Representative Scott Garrett proposed an amendment to strike money in a spending bill for native Alaskan and Hawaiian educational programs. Young defended the funds on the House floor, saying, "You want my money, my money" and "Those who bite me will be bitten back." He also suggested that conservative Republicans such as Garrett lost the Republicans their majority in the 2006 election by challenging spending earmarks, and made several critical remarks about Garrett's state, New Jersey. Garrett did not ask for an official reprimand, but other conservative Republicans took exception to Young's claim that the funds in question were "his" money. Members of the conservative Republican Study Committee gave Garrett a standing ovation later in the day during the group's weekly meeting and Virginia Foxx of North Carolina compared Young's earmarks to "legal theft".

In 2008, the United States Department of Justice investigated Young's role in steering $10 million into a Florida transportation project. In 2010, the investigation concluded with no charges against Young. In 2011, Citizens for Responsibility and Ethics in Washington (CREW) filed a lawsuit seeking information on the investigation. Some documents were subsequently released, and a judge ordered the federal government to pay CREW $86,000 in legal fees.

In 2010, when Democrat Charles Rangel of New York was censured for ethical violations, Young and Representative Peter T. King were the only two Republicans voting against censure.

==== 2011–2020 ====
In the 112th Congress, Young signed Americans for Tax Reform's Taxpayer Protection Pledge.

In 2012, Young endorsed then-Representative Mazie Hirono in the Democratic primary for the United States Senate.

In March 2013, the House Ethics Committee created a special committee to investigate allegations that Young had improperly accepted gifts, used campaign funds for personal expenses, failed to report gifts in financial disclosure documents, and made false statements to federal officials. Young said, "it will go forever. I've been under a cloud all my life. I'm sort of like living in Juneau. It rains on you all the time. You don't even notice it." In 2014, the committee rebuked Young after finding he had failed to disclose gifts totaling over $60,000 between 2001 and 2013.

In March 2013, Young used the ethnic slur "wetbacks" during a radio interview to describe Latino migrants who worked at his father's ranch when he was growing up. He issued a statement later that day saying that he "meant no disrespect" and that he "used a term that was commonly used during my days growing up on a farm in central California". Young later formally apologized for his remarks, saying, "I apologize for the insensitive term" and that "it was a poor choice of words."

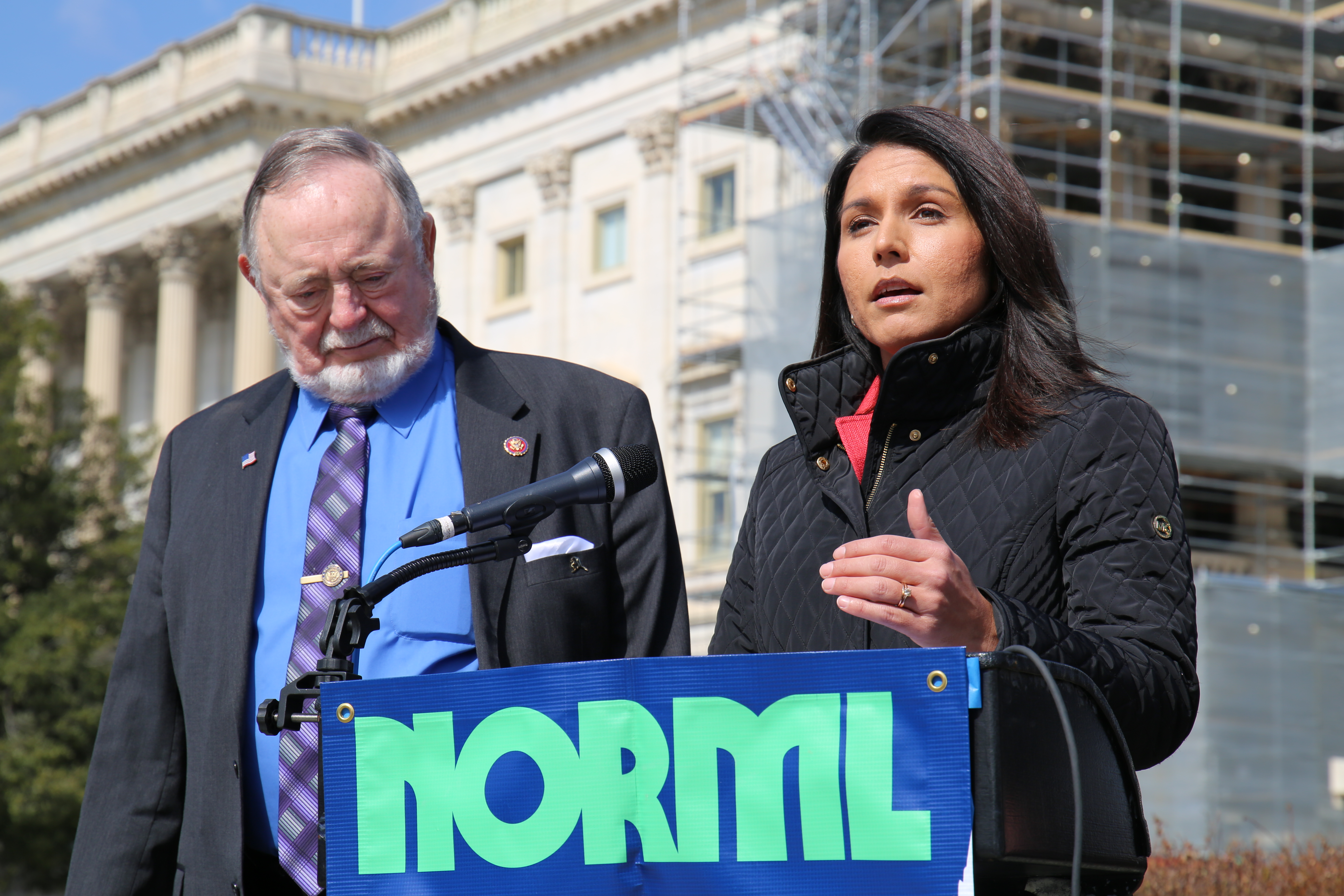
Young and Rep. Tulsi Gabbard speaking in support of the Ending Federal Marijuana Prohibition Act in 2019

In May 2016, Young wrote a letter to the Clerk of the U.S. House of Representatives stating that for 25 years he had failed to disclose his inherited interest in a family farm in California on which he and other family members had signed oil and gas leases; Young said the omissions to his financial reporting were accidental.

On May 4, 2017, though he had indicated two months earlier that he would oppose repeal of the Affordable Care Act, he voted for its repeal. Governor Bill Walker said Alaska "would be the most negatively affected if the proposed legislation is signed into law as is. Alaskans already pay the highest health care premiums in the country." U.S. Senator Lisa Murkowski opposed the removal of the provision in the act that eliminated discrimination against those with preexisting conditions, saying it was not "what Alaskans are telling me they think is an acceptable response." It was estimated that annual policy costs for coverage under the state's exchange would rise by $12,599.

In 2017, former Speaker of the United States House of Representatives John Boehner told Politico that Young had once pinned him against a wall inside the House and held a 10-inch knife to his throat.

In September 2017, during a House floor debate on an amendment to the 2018 government spending package for wildlife management and national preserves in Alaska, Young made critical comments about Representative Pramila Jayapal, including calling the 51-year old Jayapal "young lady" and saying that she "doesn't know a damn thing what she's talking about" and that her speech on the amendment "was really nonsense. It was written by an interest group". The exchange led to a temporary suspension of proceedings: upon their resumption, Young acknowledged in an address to the floor that his comments were "out of order" and apologized to Jayapal; she accepted.

Georgetown University's McCourt School of Public Policy rated Young among the most bipartisan members of Congress for the 115th and 116th Congresses.

==== 2021–2022 ====
On May 19, 2021, Young introduced H.R.3361, the United States Ambassador at Large for Arctic Affairs Act of 2021, which would create a presidentially appointed and Senate-confirmed Ambassador at Large for Arctic Affairs who would represent the U.S. in matters relating to the Arctic before international bodies of which the U.S. is a member, foreign nations, and multilateral negotiations. No votes have been held on the bill. On November 5, 2021, Young was among the 13 House Republicans to break with their party and vote with a majority of Democrats for the Infrastructure Investment and Jobs Act. Former president Donald Trump castigated the 13 House Republicans who voted for the bill.

At the time of his death, he was the oldest and longest-tenured member of Congress.

=== Committee assignments ===
- Committee on Natural Resources
  - Subcommittee on National Parks, Forests and Public Lands
  - Subcommittee on Indigenous Peoples of the United States (Ranking Member)
  - Subcommittee on Water, Oceans and Wildlife
- Committee on Transportation and Infrastructure
  - Subcommittee on Aviation
  - Subcommittee on Coast Guard and Maritime Transportation
  - Subcommittee on Highways and Transit

=== Caucus memberships ===
- Arthritis Caucus
- Congressional Cannabis Caucus
- Congressional Unmanned Systems Caucus
- House Biomedical Research Caucus
- House Diabetes Caucus
- United States Congressional International Conservation Caucus
- Renewable Energy and Energy Efficiency Caucus
- Sportsmen's Caucus
- Congressional Cement Caucus
- Afterschool Caucuses
- Congressional Western Caucus

== Political positions ==
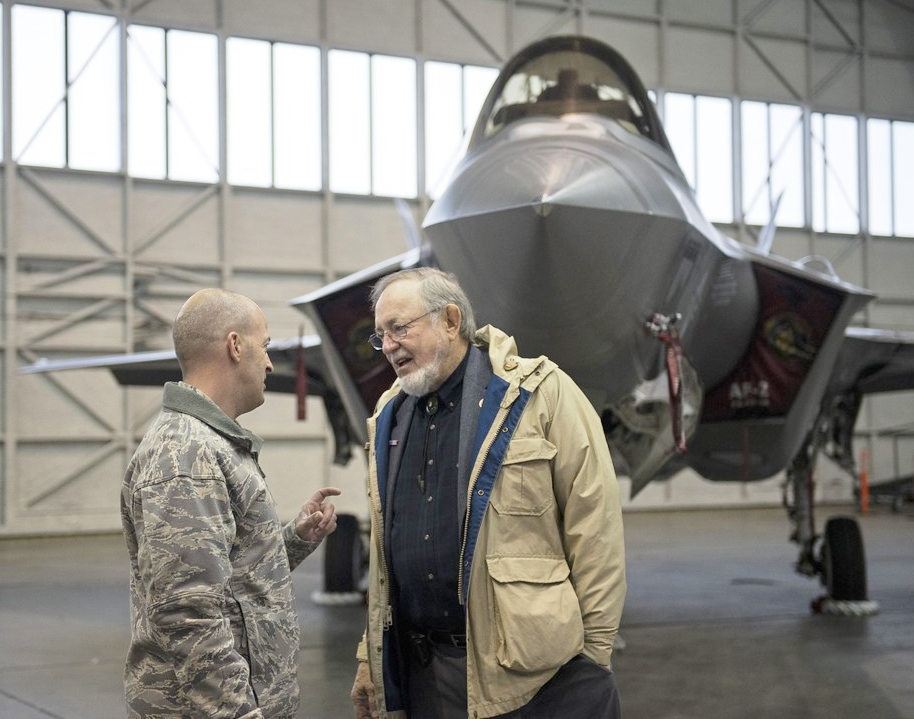
Congressman Donald Young visits the installation for the F-35 community showcase at Eielson Air Force Base.

=== Abortion ===
Young believed that abortion should be legal only when the pregnancy is a result of incest or rape or when a woman's life is endangered by her pregnancy. Young's views on abortion were largely anti-abortion during his congressional career: he voted for the Pain-Capable Unborn Child Protection Act while making exception for maternal endangerment and favored stripping federal funds from Planned Parenthood. On the other hand, Young did not oppose using embryonic stem cells in scientific research.

=== Arctic oil drilling ===
When then-U.S. president Donald Trump signed an executive order that rolled back Obama-era restrictions on Arctic oil drilling, Young commended Trump for "recognizing the importance of development in the Arctic OCS".

The Arctic Refuge drilling controversy repeatedly brought Young into the national spotlight. He was a longstanding supporter of opening lands within the Arctic National Wildlife Refuge to oil exploration. He included provisions to that effect in 12 bills that have passed the House, but environmentalists concerned with the impact of road-building, pipelines and other development on the Arctic tundra landscape blocked these efforts.

=== Arts funding ===
Young questioned public funding of the arts, but in his later years supported legislation increasing funding for the National Endowment for the Arts (NEA).

At an assembly at Fairbanks' West Valley High School in 1995, Young was answering questions about cutting federal funding for the arts. He said that such funding had "photographs of people doing offensive things", and "things that are absolutely ridiculous." When asked for an example, Young quickly replied "buttfucking", in reference to Robert Mapplethorpe's photographic exhibition The Perfect Moment. After receiving criticism for the use of that obscenity, Young explained his choice of words by saying he had tried "to educate" teens.

=== Bridges ===
==== "Bridge to Nowhere" ====
In 2005, Young and Stevens earmarked $223 million for building the Gravina Island Bridge from Ketchikan to Gravina Island, which also contains Ketchikan's airport. The bridge would be used for access by emergency vehicles, as well as passengers, and to facilitate transport to a proposed for-profit prison. There is a small ferry for cars and passengers that travels the .25-mile (0.40 km) crossing in three to seven minutes and runs every half-hour. Critics assailed this as pork barrel spending at taxpayers' expense and The New York Times quoted Keith Ashdown, spokesman for the Taxpayers for Common Sense: "It's a gold-plated bridge to nowhere." "At a time when we have bridges and roads crumbling around the United States, and traffic congestion worse than ever, why build a $200 million project that will serve only a few hundred people?" The Gravina Island Bridge was awarded a Golden Fleece Award by that organization in 2003. After criticism from citizens and others in Congress, lawmakers de-funded the bridge and instead funneled the money to the Alaska Department of Transportation, allowing the governor of Alaska to build the Gravina Island Highway after the Alaska legislature funded the project with the directed monies.

==== Knik Arm bridge ====
The Knik Arm Bridge that was earmarked in the bill would connect Anchorage to Point Mackenzie, a lightly populated area in the Matanuska-Susitna Borough that is less than four miles (6 km) across Cook Inlet from downtown Anchorage. Anchorage is accessible from Point Mackenzie only by an 80-mile (130 km) route around Knik Arm, some of which was an unimproved road. The demise of this second bridge project had been suggested for years.

Part of the concern about the bridge was that if it were built, it would significantly enhance the value of property in which Young's son-in-law owned an interest. Young was listed as the third-worst congressman by Rolling Stone, and dubbed "Mr. Pork" due to his involvement in the Gravina Island "Bridge to Nowhere".

=== Cannabis ===
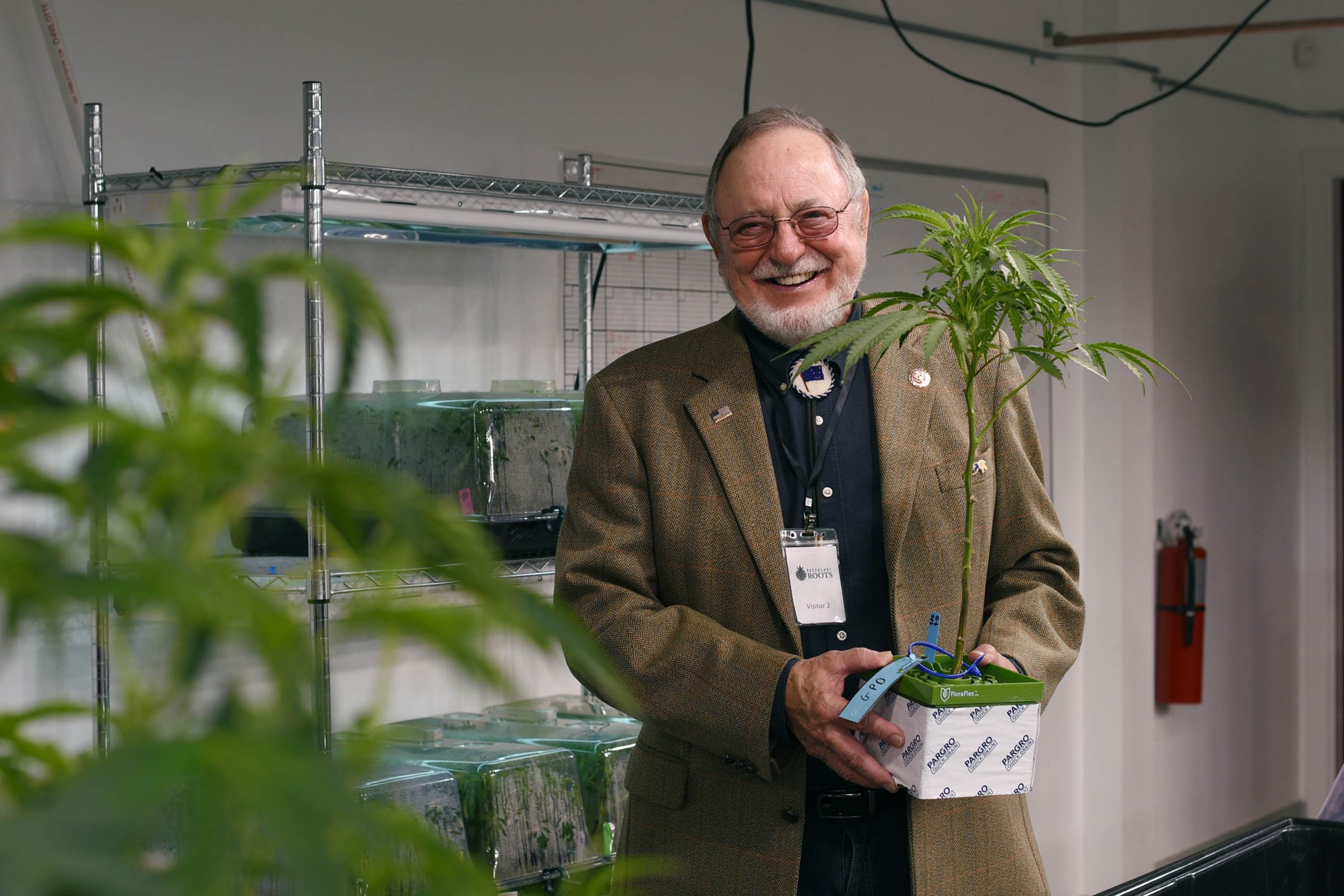
Don Young with a cannabis plant at a facility in Alaska in 2019

Young supported a number of efforts to reform cannabis laws in Congress. In 2019 he introduced the Ending Federal Marijuana Prohibition Act to remove cannabis from the Controlled Substances Act. Other legislation Young introduced includes the CARERS Act in 2015 (to reschedule cannabis under the Controlled Substances Act) and the SAFE Banking Act in 2017 (to improve access to banking services for cannabis businesses). In February 2017, Young launched the Congressional Cannabis Caucus with Representatives Earl Blumenauer, Dana Rohrabacher, and Jared Polis. He toured several cannabis facilities in Alaska in October 2019.

In 2020, Young was one of only five House Republicans to vote for the Marijuana Opportunity Reinvestment and Expungement (MORE) Act. The act aimed to "correct the historical injustices of failed drug policies that have disproportionately impacted communities of color"; it included provisions to remove cannabis from the Controlled Substances Act, impose a federal tax on cannabis products, and use the proceeds of the tax to fund restorative justice programs.

In 2021, Young introduced the Gun Rights and Marijuana (GRAM) Act to allow the ownership of firearms by people who use cannabis in accordance with state law. Also in 2021, Young introduced the Cannabis Reform for Veterans, Small Businesses, and Medical Professionals Act to remove cannabis from the Controlled Substances Act and direct federal agencies to develop regulations for cannabis similar to alcohol. Later in 2021 he was one of four original cosponsors of the Republican-led States Reform Act to legalize cannabis federally.

=== Civil liberties ===
Young voted for the Civil Liberties Act of 1988, which provided reparations for Japanese Americans imprisoned by the U.S. government during World War II. He attended Reagan's official signing ceremony for the bill. Young also voted for the Civil Rights Act of 1991, which clarified the 1964 civil rights act in response to several controversial U.S. Supreme Court cases.

=== Climate change ===
October is National Energy Awareness Month, and the topic of energy production and its role in driving climate change — very rightfully — is as important a topic as ever. While the United States is leading the way in developing energy in significantly cleaner ways than countries like Russia, Venezuela and China, Democrats continue to promote a policy agenda that would cripple our economy and cause energy prices to skyrocket for American families.

— Don Young, October 31, 2019 in The Hill

Young had previously said that he did not believe in anthropogenic climate change and that the idea of global warming is "the biggest scam since the Teapot Dome." Despite these public statements, Young signed a letter to Speaker Nancy Pelosi and Minority Leader Kevin McCarthy that recognized the urgency behind combating climate change, writing, "We are confronting multiple and intersecting crises—the COVID-19 pandemic, an economy in turmoil, societal injustice, and, above all, the climate crisis—all of which demand swift and bold action." Young voted for the FY 2019 National Defense Authorization Act, which identifies climate change as a national security threat. In a 2019 op-ed in The Hill, Young took a conciliatory position on climate change, and called for policy changes that could reduce carbon emissions.

Young voted for the John D. Dingell, Jr. Conservation, Management, and Recreation Act, which included permanent reauthorization of the Land and Water Conservation Fund.

Young supported exempting the Tongass National Forest from the Roadless Rule, saying, "An exemption will not only bring great economic benefit to Alaska but will also help bolster the long-term health of the Tongass National Forest. The Tongass is an invaluable natural resource and it requires active management. Unfortunately, the Roadless Rule has only prevented Alaskans from responsibly utilizing our resources."

Young supported an increase in the federal gasoline tax to keep pace with the continued rise in gasoline efficiency of automobiles.

=== COVID-19 ===
At a town hall in Palmer, Alaska, on March 13, 2020, Young said of the pandemic, "This is blown out of proportion about how deadly this is. He continued, "It's deadly but it's not nearly as deadly as the other viruses we have ... I call it the hysteria concept", as well calling it the "beer virus" (referencing the similarly-named Corona beer). Young later clarified that he was attempting to urge calm. On March 17, 2020, as the COVID-19 pandemic spread rapidly in the U.S., he missed the vote on a $2 trillion bill to deal with pandemic, instead attending a National Rifle Association of America fundraiser. As public awareness of the pandemic's severity grew, Young walked back his comments. By March 25, in a video message, he said the impact of COVID-19 is "very real, growing", and was reshaping our daily lives. Urging Americans to stay home, he continued, "Weeks ago, I did not truly grasp the severity of this crisis, but clearly we are in the midst of an urgent public health emergency."

On November 6, 2020, Young was photographed maskless at a birthday party for a staff member in an Anchorage restaurant. Numerous well-known political operatives who attended, including former Lieutenant Governor Mead Treadwell, soon tested positive for COVID-19. On November 12, Young was diagnosed with COVID-19. He was admitted to Providence Alaska Medical Center in Anchorage that day and released on November 15, writing, "Very frankly, I had not felt this sick in a very long time, and I am grateful to everyone who has kept me in their thoughts and prayers." He confirmed to a The Washington Post reporter that "many" of his campaign staff had been infected, as well as his wife, who he said was asymptomatic.

=== Donald Trump ===
During the 2016 Republican presidential primary, Young originally supported Jeb Bush, and later John Kasich. In April 2016, he said, "I'm not supporting Donald Trump", and when asked about Trump's success in the primaries, said that it was due to "a bunch of idiots following a pied piper over the edge of the cliff" and that he blamed the people who voted for Trump. By December 2016, he was more supportive of Trump's accomplishments and proposed policies.

In September 2019, Young called the investigation and the Trump impeachment inquiry "a waste of time". He voted against the first and second impeachments of Trump.

=== Joe Biden ===
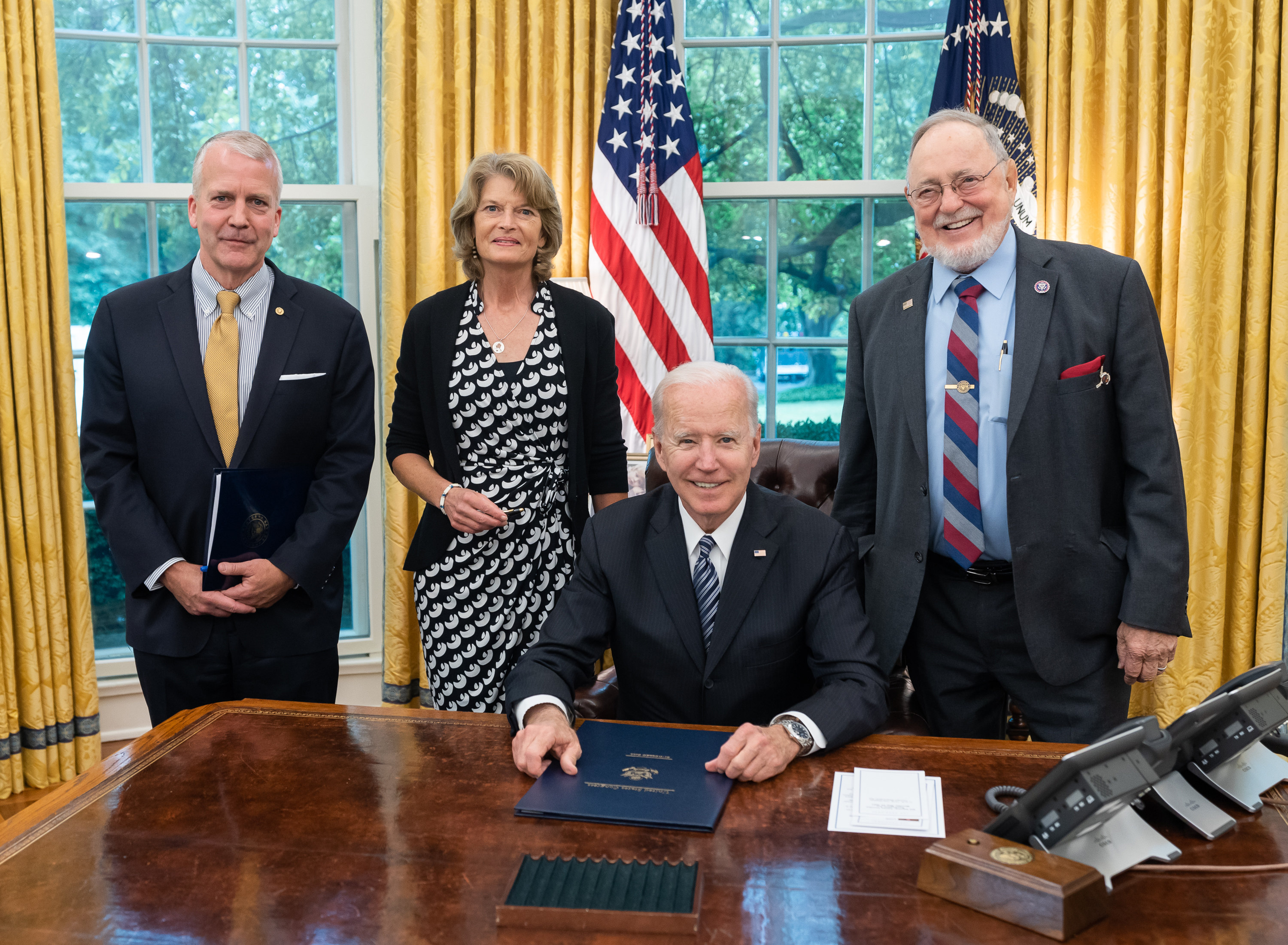
Congressman Young joins President Biden and Alaska senators Lisa Murkowski and Dan Sullivan in the Oval Office as he signs Young's Alaska Tourism Restoration Act into law.

On November 7, 2020, Young was one of the first Republicans to acknowledge and congratulate Joe Biden on his victory in the 2020 presidential election. On January 6, 2021, Young affirmed Biden's victory by voting against the objections to counting electoral votes from Arizona and Pennsylvania.

Young was a strong supporter of Biden's nominee for United States Secretary of the Interior, Deb Haaland. He called Haaland, a Democrat, a friend and said it was "a long time overdue" for the U.S. to have a Native American interior secretary. Haaland asked Young to introduce her at her confirmation hearing before the United States Senate Committee on Energy and Natural Resources. Senator Joe Manchin, a crucial swing vote, cited Young's support of Haaland as a reason for his support.

As of October 2021, Young had voted in line with Joe Biden's stated position 30.6% of the time.

=== Environmental regulation ===
Young said he believed the Environmental Protection Agency should not regulate greenhouse gases, and that it kills jobs. He said, "Environmentalists are a self-centered bunch of waffle-stomping, Harvard-graduating, intellectual idiots" who "are not Americans, never have been Americans, never will be Americans." But Young supported omnibus spending bills that maintain current EPA funding levels despite calls from the Trump Administration to cut such funding.

In 1988, Young voted against the Abandoned Shipwrecks Act of 1987.

In 2019, Young and Debbie Dingell introduced legislation providing for a long-term reauthorization of the National Fish and Wildlife Foundation.

=== Healthcare legislation ===
Young said he wanted to see a clean repeal of the Affordable Care Act (ACA), but said in March 2017 that he would not vote on an earlier version of the AHCA (a healthcare plan to repeal and revise parts of the ACA) because it would have too negative an impact on health care costs in Alaska.

According to the Center on Budget and Policy Priorities, the AHCA would raise health care costs in Alaska more than in any other state, and by 2020, on average Alaskans would receive $10,243 less per year under the AHCA compared to the ACA for the same coverage, almost double the cost increase of any other state (the next being North Carolina with consumers receiving $5,360 less per year). Young said, "Nothing in this new bill addressed the real problems of health care."

The AHCA would also stop the Medicaid expansion Obamacare provided, which gives health coverage to more than 27,000 of Young's constituents, about 3.7% of the Alaska population. For those reasons, Young was a key House member preventing the AHCA from going to a vote. When the AHCA did not pass, Young said it was a "victory for Alaska". But despite those statements, and being officially "undecided" because of the disproportionate impact on Alaskans, Young voted for the AHCA on May 4, 2017, without any significant changes to improving Alaska subsidies.

An organization called Save My Care spent $500,000 to release a series of attack ads against 24 House members who voted for the AHCA, including one about Young that decried his vote, claiming it would raise health care costs for Alaskans.

=== Gay rights ===
In 2007, Young voted against the Employment Non-Discrimination Act (E.N.D.A.). In a 2014 debate, he said he would "probably" vote for E.N.D.A.

In 2015, Young was one of 60 Republicans voting to uphold President Barack Obama’s 2014 executive order banning federal contractors from making hiring decisions that discriminate based on sexual orientation or gender identity.

In 2015, Young issued a statement saying that while he believed marriage should be between a man and a woman, he recognizes that the law is settled on this issue, and stated that he accepts the Supreme Court decision ruling same-sex marriage bans as unconstitutional.

In 2021, Young was one of 29 Republicans to vote to reauthorize the Violence Against Women Act. This bill expanded legal protections for transgender people, and contained provisions allowing transgender women to use women's shelters and serve time in prisons matching their gender identity.

In 2021, Young was one of 33 Republicans to vote for the LGBTQ Business Equal Credit Enforcement and Investment Act.

=== Organized labor ===
Young frequently earned the support of organized labor, and in the 116th Congress, voted in support of the pro-union PRO Act, which would make it easier for workers to certify unions, augment how employers classify laborers and prevent laborers from being denied rights on the basis of their immigration status.

=== Policing and criminal justice reform ===
Young voted to make lynching a federal crime and supported House passage of the First Step Act, which reforms sentencing laws to reduce recidivism and decrease the federal inmate population.

In the aftermath of the 2020 protests related to the murder of George Floyd, Young voted for the 2021 National Defense Authorization Act, which would remove Confederate names from U.S. military installations.

Young voted for legislation authorizing the creation of a Commission on the Social Status of Black Men and Boys. In 2020, the bill was signed into law. The commission is intended to examine societal disparities that black men and boys face at disproportionately high rates.

In 2021, Young cosponsored and voted for the EQUAL Act, which eliminates the federal sentencing disparity between crack cocaine and powdered cocaine.

=== Post Office ===
On August 22, 2020, Young was one of 26 Republicans to vote for a $25 billion relief package for the U.S. Post Office.

=== Suicide rate in Alaska ===
When asked about the fact that Alaska has the highest per capita suicide rate in the U.S., Young said that he believed it is at least partially the result of government handouts, and that "this suicide problem didn't exist until we got largesse from the government." He believed Alaska needs to cut public assistance programs.

In response to an increase in suicides among active-duty service members at Fort Wainwright in 2019, Young called on the U.S. Army to investigate the cause of the increased suicide rate.

On October 21, 2014, Young addressed an assembly of students at Wasilla High School shortly after a student there committed suicide. During a question and answer session, he said a lack of support from family and friends had caused the student's suicide. During the assembly, Young also recalled a story about drinking alcohol in Paris, and used profanity several times, officials from the school reported.

When a student criticized Young for his comments on suicide, Young called him an "asshole". Young apologized for these comments on October 24, saying, "I am profoundly and genuinely sorry for the pain it has caused the Alaskan people."

=== Missing and murdered indigenous women and girls ===
In the 116th Congress, Young helped introduce the BADGES Act to help solve the crisis of missing and murdered indigenous women. He was one of 33 Republicans to vote to reauthorize the Violence Against Women Act, which included his amendment to help end violence against indigenous women.

=== Town halls ===
Young said he did not believe in conducting town halls (district meetings for officials to meet and speak with constituents in a town hall setting). When he was asked for a face-to-face meeting with his constituents in April 2017, an aide said, "The modern town hall has taken an unfortunate turn as a 'show' for the media and are [sic] unproductive for meaningful dialogue." Young's meetings in Alaska were primarily with elected officials, business groups, service clubs, and gatherings of Republicans. On April 20, 2017, residents started a town hall meeting by themselves, speaking to Young through a video camera with a color photo of Young to represent him.

In Juneau, while speaking to the Alaska Municipal League in 2018, Young asked the crowd, "How many millions of people were shot and killed because they were unarmed? Fifty million in Russia because their citizens were unarmed." Facing criticism, Young's office insisted that his comments were taken out of context, stating, "He was referencing the fact that when Hitler confiscated firearms from Jewish Germans, those communities were less able to defend themselves. He was not implying that an armed Jewish population would have been able to prevent the horrors of the Holocaust, but his intended message is that disarming citizens can have detrimental consequences."

=== Migrant detention facilities ===
In 2019, Young was the sole Republican to vote for the Humanitarian Standards for Individuals in Customs and Border Protection Custody Act, which set minimum standards for Customs and Border Protection detention facilities, including requiring health screenings and ensuring that basic needs of detained migrants, such as access to food and water for detainees, are met.

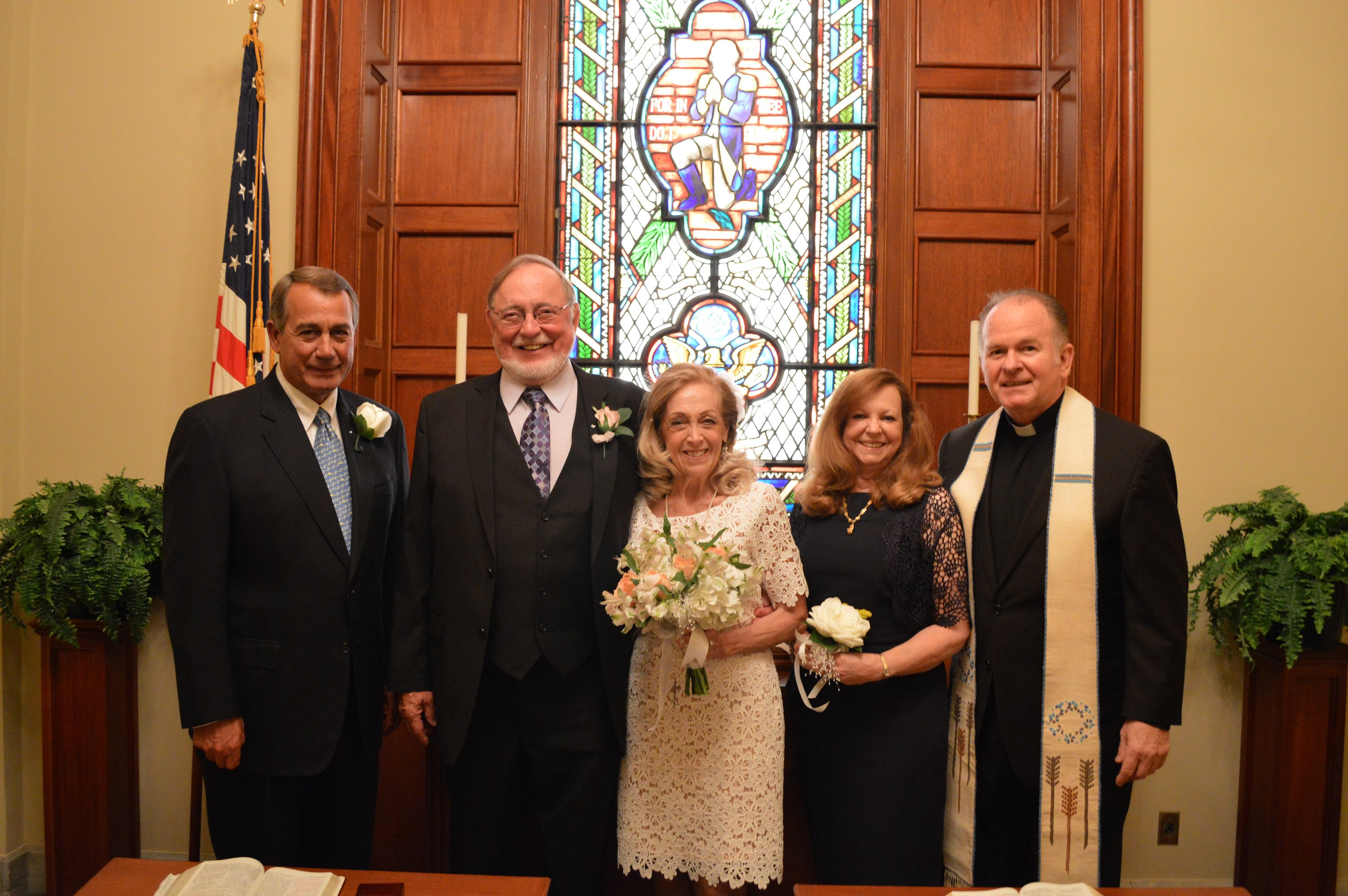
Don Young and Ann Garland Walton on their wedding day in 2015. John Boehner was Young's best man.

== Personal life ==
In 1963, Young married Lula Fredson, who worked as a bookkeeper in Fort Yukon. She was a Gwich'in and the youngest child of early-20th-century Gwich'in leader John Fredson. She volunteered her time serving as the manager of Young's Washington, D.C. congressional office. They had two daughters and were members of the Episcopal Church. Lula died on August 1, 2009, at age 67.

On August 17, 2014, Young announced his engagement to Anne Garland Walton, a flight nurse from Fairbanks. They married on June 9, 2015. She was 76 years old at the time.

=== Death ===
On March 18, 2022, Young was on a flight from Los Angeles to Seattle while traveling to Alaska. Toward the end of the flight, he lost consciousness, and was declared dead, aged 88, after the plane landed at Seattle–Tacoma International Airport. Also on the flight was his wife Anne Garland Walton and communications director Zack Brown.

Young lay in state in the U.S. Capitol's National Statuary Hall on March 29, 2022, before his memorial service. He was the 43rd person to have this honor since 1852.

== Electoral history ==
Almanac

United States Congressional Service
Years	Congress	Chamber	House Majority	President	Congressional District
1973–75	93rd	U.S. House	Democratic	Richard Nixon Gerald Ford	Alaska’s At-large
1975–77	94th	U.S. House	Democratic	Gerald Ford	Alaska’s At-large
1977–79	95th	U.S. House	Democratic	Jimmy Carter	Alaska’s At-large
1979–81	96th	U.S. House	Democratic	Jimmy Carter	Alaska’s At-large
1981–83	97th	U.S. House	Democratic	Ronald Reagan	Alaska’s At-large
1983–85	98th	U.S. House	Democratic	Ronald Reagan	Alaska’s At-large
1985–87	99th	U.S. House	Democratic	Ronald Reagan	Alaska’s At-large
1987–89	100th	U.S. House	Democratic	Ronald Reagan	Alaska’s At-large
1989–91	101st	U.S. House	Democratic	George H.W. Bush	Alaska’s At-large
1991–93	102nd	U.S. House	Democratic	George H.W. Bush	Alaska’s At-large
1993–95	103rd	U.S. House	Democratic	Bill Clinton	Alaska’s At-large
1995–97	104th	U.S. House	Republican	Bill Clinton	Alaska’s At-large
1997–99	105th	U.S. House	Republican	Bill Clinton	Alaska’s At-large
1999–2001	106th	U.S. House	Republican	Bill Clinton	Alaska’s At-large
2001–2003	107th	U.S. House	Republican	George W. Bush	Alaska’s At-large
2003–05	108th	U.S. House	Republican	George W. Bush	Alaska’s At-large
2005–07	109th	U.S. House	Republican	George W. Bush	Alaska’s At-large
2007–09	110th	U.S. House	Democratic	George W. Bush	Alaska’s At-large
2009–11	111th	U.S. House	Democratic	Barack Obama	Alaska’s At-large
2011–13	112th	U.S. House	Republican	Barack Obama	Alaska’s At-large
2013–15	113th	U.S. House	Republican	Barack Obama	Alaska’s At-large
2015–17	114th	U.S. House	Republican	Barack Obama	Alaska’s At-large
2017–19	115th	U.S. House	Republican	Donald Trump	Alaska’s At-large
2019–21	116th	U.S. House	Democratic	Donald Trump	Alaska’s At-large
2021–22	117th	U.S. House	Democratic	Joe Biden	Alaska’s At-large

Electoral results

Alaska's at-large congressional district: Results 1972–2020
Year	Republican	Votes	Pct	Democratic	Votes	Pct	Third Party	Votes	Pct	Third Party	Votes	Pct	Third Party	Votes	Pct	Write-in votes	Write-in %
1972	Don Young	41,750	43.76%	Nick J. Begich* † (Note: Went missing October 16, 1972 (before the election); declared dead December 29, 1972.)	53,651	56.24%											
1973	Don Young	35,044	51.41%	Emil Notti	33,123	48.39%											
1974	Don Young*	51,641	53.84%	William L. Hensley	44,280	46.16%											
1976	Don Young*	83,722	71.00%	Eben Hopson	34,194	29.00%											
1978	Don Young*	68,811	55.41%	Patrick Rodey	55,176	44.43%										200	0.16%
1980	Don Young*	114,089	73.79%	Kevin Parnell	39,922	25.82%										607	0.39%
1982	Don Young*	128,274	70.84%	Dave Carlson	52,011	28.72%										799	0.44%
1984	Don Young*	113,582	55.02%	Pegge Begich	86,052	41.68%	Betty Breck (I)	6,508	3.15%							295	0.14%
1986	Don Young*	101,799	56.47%	Pegge Begich	74,053	41.08%	Betty Breck (L)	4,182	2.32%							243	0.14%
1988	Don Young*	120,595	62.50%	Peter Gruenstein	71,881	37.25%										479	0.25%
1990	Don Young*	99,003	51.66%	John S. Devens	91,677	47.84%										967	0.51%
1992	Don Young*	111,849	46.78%	John S. Devens	102,378	42.82%	Michael States (AKI)	15,049	6.29%	Mike Milligan (G)	9,529	3.99%				311	0.13%
1994	Don Young*	118,537	56.92%	Tony Smith	68,172	32.74%	Joni Whitmore (G)	21,277	10.22%							254	0.12%
1996	Don Young*	138,834	59.41%	Georgianna Lincoln	85,114	36.42%	William J. Nemec II (AKI)	5,017	2.15%	John J. G. Grames (G)	4,513	1.93%				222	0.10%
1998	Don Young*	139,676	62.55%	Jim Duncan	77,232	34.59%	John J. G. Grames (G)	5,923	2.65%							469	0.21%
2000	Don Young*	190,862	69.56%	Clifford Mark Greene	45,372	16.54%	Anna C. Young (G)	22,440	8.18%	Jim Dore (AKI)	10,085	3.68%	Leonard J. Karpinski (L)	4,802	1.75%	832	0.30%
2002	Don Young*	169,685	74.66%	Clifford Mark Greene	39,357	17.32%	Russell deForest (G)	14,435	6.35%	Rob Clift (L)	3,797	1.67%				291	0.00%
2004	Don Young*	213,216	71.34%	Thomas M. Higgins	67,074	22.44%	Timothy A. Feller (G)	11,434	3.83%	Alvin A. Anders (L)	7,157	2.40%				1,115	0.4%
2006	Don Young*	132,743	56.57%	Diane E. Benson	93,879	40.01%	Alexander Crawford (L)	4,029	1.72%	Eva L. Ince (G)	1,819	0.78%	William W. Ratigan (I)	1,615	0.69%	560	0.24%
2008	Don Young*	158,939	50.14%	Ethan Berkowitz	142,560	44.98%	Don Wright (AKI)	14,274	4.50%							1,205	0.38%
2010	Don Young*	175,384	68.87%	Harry Crawford	77,606	30.64%										1,345	0.49%
2012	Don Young*	185,296	63.94%	Sharon Cissna	82,927	28.61%	Jim McDermott (L)	15,028	5.19%	Ted Gianoutsos (I)	5,589	1.93%				964	0.33%
2014	Don Young*	142,572	50.97%	Forrest Dunbar	114,602	40.97%	Jim McDermott (L)	21,290	7.61%							1,277	0.46%
2016	Don Young*	155,088	50.32%	Steve Lindbeck	111,019	36.02%	Jim McDermott (L)	31,770	10.31%	Bernie Souphanavong (I)	9,093	2.95%				1,228	0.40%
2018	Don Young*	149,779	53.08%	Alyse Galvin	131,199	46.50%										1,188	0.42%
2020	Don Young*	191,606	54.36%	Alyse Galvin	159,710	45.31%										1,176	0.33%

== See also ==
- List of members of the United States Congress who died in office (2000–present)
- Don Young Day

U.S. House of Representatives
Preceded by Nick Begich	Member of the U.S. House of Representatives from Alaska's at-large congressional district 1973–2022	Succeeded by Mary Peltola
Preceded by Manuel Lujan Jr.	Ranking Member of the House Natural Resources Committee; Interior and Insular Affairs (1985–1991); 1985–1995	Succeeded by George Miller
Preceded by George Miller	Chair of the House Resources Committee; 1995–2001	Succeeded by James V. Hansen
Preceded by Bud Shuster	Chair of the House Transportation Committee; 2001–2007	Succeeded by Jim Oberstar
Preceded by Nick Rahall	Ranking Member of the House Natural Resources Committee; 2007–2009	Succeeded by Doc Hastings
Honorary titles
Preceded by Bill Young	Most senior Republican in the U.S. House of Representatives; 2013–2022	Succeeded by Hal Rogers
Preceded by John Conyers	Dean of the United States House of Representatives; 2017–2022	Succeeded by Hal Rogers
Preceded by Sam Johnson	Oldest member of the U.S. House of Representatives; 2019–2022	Succeeded by Eddie Bernice Johnson
Preceded by Harry Reid	Persons who have lain in state or honor in the United States Capitol rotunda March 29, 2022	Succeeded by Hershel W. Williams
