= Safe, Accountable, Flexible, Efficient Transportation Equity Act: A Legacy for Users =

United States federal highway legislation

- Long title: An act to authorize funds for Federal-aid highways, highway safety programs, and transit programs, and for other purposes.
- Acronyms (colloquial): SAFETEA-LU
- Enacted by: the 109th United States Congress

Citations
- Public law: Pub. L. 109–59 (text) (PDF)
- Statutes at Large: 119 Stat. 1144

Legislative history
- Introduced in the House as H.R. 3 by Don Young (R–AK) on February 9, 2005; Passed the House on March 10, 2005 (417-9); Passed the Senate on May 15, 2005 (89-11); Reported by the joint conference committee on June 28, 2005; agreed to by the House on June 29, 2005 (412-8) and by the Senate on June 29, 2005 (91-4); Signed into law by President George W. Bush on August 10, 2005

Safe, Accountable, Flexible, Efficient Transportation Equity Act: A Legacy for Users or SAFETEA-LU /ˈseɪftiːˈluː/ was a funding and authorization bill that governed United States federal surface transportation spending. It was signed into law by President George W. Bush on August 10, 2005, as Pub. L. 109–59 (text) (PDF) and 119 Stat. 1144.

== History ==
The $244.1 billion measure contained a host of provisions and earmarks intended to improve and maintain the surface transportation infrastructure in the United States, including the Interstate Highway System, transit systems around the country, bicycling and pedestrian facilities, and freight rail operations. The bill was named after Lu Young, the wife of Representative Don Young.

Congress renewed its funding formulas ten times after its expiration date in 2009, until replacing the bill with the Moving Ahead for Progress in the 21st Century Act (MAP-21) in 2012.

== Support and opposition ==
In 2006 Speaker of the United States House of Representatives, Dennis Hastert, championed a $207-million earmark inserted in the omnibus highway bill for the Prairie Parkway, a proposed expressway running through his district. The Sunlight Foundation accused Hastert of failing to disclose that the construction of the highway would benefit a land investment that Hastert and his wife made in nearby land in 2004 and 2005. Hastert took an unusually active role advancing the bill, even though it was opposed by a majority of area residents and by the Illinois Department of Transportation.

The law garnered a large amount of bipartisan support, though support was not unanimous, particularly among those who believed it to be laden with too much pork barrel spending. Early versions of the bill budgeted over $300 billion, but President Bush promised to veto any surface transportation bill costing more than $256 billion. A compromise of $284 billion was reached, and signed into law by the President. When the speaker became frustrated by negotiations with White House staff, Hastert began working on the bill directly with President Bush. After passage the President even traveled to Hastert's district for the law's signing ceremony before thousands of workers in a Caterpillar Inc. factory.

Four months later Hastert sold the land for a 500% profit. Hastert's net worth went from $300,000 to at least $6.2 million. Hastert received five-eighths of the proceeds of the sale of the land, turning a $1.8 million profit in under two years. Hastert's ownership interest in the tract was not a public record because the land was held by a blind land trust, Little Rock Trust No. 225. There were three partners in the trust: Hastert, Thomas Klatt, and Dallas Ingemunson. However, public documents only named Ingemunson, who was the Kendall County Republican Party chairman and Hastert's personal attorney and longtime friend. Hastert denied any wrongdoing. In October 2006, Norman Ornstein and Scott Lilly wrote that the Prairie Parkway affair was "worse than FoleyGate" and called for Hastert's resignation.

In 2012, after Hastert had departed from Congress, the highway project was killed after federal regulators retracted the 2008 approval of an environmental impact statement for the project and agreed to an Illinois Department of Transportation request to redirect the funds for other projects. Environmentalists, who opposed the project, celebrated its cancellation.

Inserted into this bill nearly last-minute is the so-called 'Midnight Rider' authored by then-Sen. Jim Inhofe (R-OK). This provision gives the state he then-represented, Oklahoma, jurisdiction over oil-drilling, mining, and natural resource exploration in Indian country—something which would've otherwise governed been by the United States Environmental Protection Agency. The 'Midnight Rider' reads as follows:

(a) OKLAHOMA. – Notwithstanding any other provision of law, if the Administrator of the Environmental Protection Agency (referred to in this section as the “Administrator”) determines that a regulatory program submitted by the State of Oklahoma for approval by the Administrator under a law administered by the Administrator meets applicable requirements of the law, and the Administrator approves the State to administer the State program under the law with respect to areas in the State that are not Indian country, on request of the State, the Administrator shall approve the State to administer the State program in the areas of the State that are in Indian country, without any further demonstration of authority by the State.

— SEC. 10211. ENVIRONMENTAL PROGRAMS., Pub. Law 109-59, 119 Stat. 1144, 1937

This provision, added to combat attempts at Tribal sovereignty over natural resources, while decried by Native American Rights advocates, received little attention outside of Oklahoma until the Supreme Court ruling in McGirt v. Oklahoma.

== Multimodalism ==
SAFETEA-LU was also the primary source of funding for other modes of surface transportation, including transit. Notably, the bill included funding for the New Starts program, which among other things helped to fund most of the new rail transit systems that opened in the United States during this time period, as well as extensions to existing systems.

SAFETEA-LU provided the first federal funding to establish a nation-wide program of Safe Routes to School initiatives.

=== New Freedom ===
The New Freedom program was a new formula grant program authorized in SAFETEA-LU to support new public transportation services and public transportation alternatives beyond those required by the Americans with Disabilities Act (ADA) of 1990 (42 U.S.C. § 12101 et. seq.). This program was codified at 49 U.S.C. §§ 5316–5317

The New Freedom Program grew out of the New Freedom Initiative introduced by the Bush administration under Executive Order 13217, "Community-Based Alternatives for Individuals with Disabilities," on June 18, 2001. President Bush included funds for the New Freedom Program in the annual budget request to Congress since FY 2003; however, it was not until the enactment of SAFETEA–LU that funding was authorized by Congress. Funding was first appropriated for the transportation provision in Fiscal Year 2006. The program was repealed when the Moving Ahead for Progress in the 21st Century Act (MAP-21) bill was adopted in 2012.

== "Bridge to Nowhere" ==
Among the many earmarks in the bill, one line item became particularly infamous. Over $200 million was apportioned for the construction of the Gravina Island Bridge in Alaska, which would connect sparsely populated regions at tremendous cost. The bridge came to be known in the national media as the "Bridge to Nowhere," and is considered a quintessential example of pork barrel politics.

On March 2, 2011, when H.R. 662: Surface Transportation Extension Act of 2011 was up for debate there was a proposed motion to recommit the bill, argued for by Jared Polis, D-Colorado, in order to add an amendment to strip funding for this project that has shown up in previous bills' earmarks. When put to a vote "On Motion to Recommit with Instructions: H.R. 662 Surface Transportation Extension Act of 2011" the vote "Failed 181–246, 5 not voting" The votes in support and against broke along party lines with only 7 Democrats voting against the motion and no Republicans voting for the motion.

In support Jared Polis (D)-Colorado (in part) argued @4:16:19: "This motion rescinds all remaining funds, about $183 million, provided for the planning, design, and construction of the two bridges under SAFETEA-LU. ... This is a very simple choice, there's no politics in this, we're not changing other parts of the bill, we're not trying to catch people off, we're not trying to trap people for 30-second spots to say they're for pornography like as has been done in previous sessions while the bill is gutted elsewhere. What we're simply providing, is a clean vote on The Bridge to Nowhere. According to the CBO [(the non-partisan Congressional Budget Office)] this motion will reduce the deficit by $160 million by eliminating funding for these two bridges, nothing else."

In opposition, Rep. John Mica (R)-Florida responded @4:18:42: "I rise in opposition to the motion to recommit." "Well congratulations my colleagues welcome to the era of smoke and mirrors and that's exactly what this motion to recommit is and I urge its defeat. And you heard the gentleman describing bridges and he again is trying to mislead the entire house on this particular motion to recommit. It is smoke and mirrors, and I urge the defeat of the motion to recommit."
