= Electoral history of the Libertarian Party (United States) =

This is a list detailing the electoral history of the Libertarian Party (United States), sorted by office. The list currently consists of candidates who ran for partisan office.

== Best major race results ==
Bold indicates race where Libertarian candidate was elected to office

Office	Percent	District	Year	Candidate
President	11.7%	Alaska	1980	Ed Clark
President	9.3%	New Mexico	2016	Gary Johnson
President	6.2%	North Dakota	2016	Gary Johnson
President	3.3%	United States	2016	Gary Johnson
US Senate	33.5%	Arkansas	2020	Ricky Dale Harrington Jr.
US Senate	29.2%	Alaska	2016	Joe Miller
US Senate	18.4%	Massachusetts	2002	Michael Cloud
US House	31.6%	Kansas District 3	2012	Joel Balam
US House	30.7%	Texas District 26	2022	Mike Kolls
US House	28.8%	Mississippi District 2	1998	William Chipman
Governor	14.9%	Alaska	1982	Dick Randolph
Governor	11.4%	Indiana	2020	Donald Rainwater
Governor	10.5%	Wisconsin	2002	Ed Thompson
Other statewide	43.1%	Montana Clerk Of The Supreme Court	2012	Mike Fellows
Other statewide	34.2%	Georgia Public Service Commission 5	2012	David Staples
Other statewide	33.4%	Georgia Public Service Commission 2	2016	Eric Hoskins
State Senate	44.4%	Nevada District 2	1992	Tamara Clark
State Senate	43.6%	Nebraska District 32	2018	Laura Ebke
State Senate	37.6%	Arkansas District 10	2018	Bobbi Hicks
State Representative	**53.6%**	Wyoming District 39	2020	**Marshall Burt**
State Representative	49.4%	Wyoming District 55	2020	Bethany Baldes
State Representative	49.0%	Wyoming District 55	2018	Bethany Baldes

=== United States Senate elections ===
In 2020, Ricky Dale Harrington Jr. received 33% of the vote in a two-way race in Arkansas, the highest percentage ever for a Libertarian candidate in a Senate election. In 2016, Joe Miller received 29% of the vote in a four-way race in Alaska. In 2002, Michael Cloud received 18% of the vote in a three-way race in Massachusetts. In 2018, Gary Johnson received 15% of the vote in a three-way race in New Mexico.

2020 United States Senate election in Arkansas
Party	Candidate	Votes	%
**Republican**	**Tom Cotton (incumbent)**	**793,871**	**66.5%**
Libertarian	Ricky Dale Harrington Jr.	399,390	33.5%

2016 United States Senate election in Alaska
Party	Candidate	Votes	%
**Republican**	**Lisa Murkowski (incumbent)**	**138,149**	**44.4%**
Libertarian	Joe Miller	90,825	29.2%
Independent	Margaret Stock	41,194	13.2%
Democratic	Ray Metcalfe	36,200	11.6%

2002 United States Senate election in Massachusetts
Party	Candidate	Votes	%
**Democratic**	**John Kerry (incumbent)**	**1,605,976**	**80.0%**
Libertarian	Michael Cloud	369,807	18.4%

=== United States House of Representatives elections ===
In 2012, Joel Balam received 32% of the vote in a two-way race in Kansas's 3rd congressional district, the best ever for a Libertarian candidate in a House election. In 2022, Mike Kolls received 31% of the vote in a two-way race in Texas's 26th congressional district. In 1998, William Chipman received 28% of the vote in a two-way race in Mississippi's 2nd congressional district.

=== Gubernatorial elections ===
In 1982, Dick Randolph received 15% of the vote in a four-way race in Alaska, the best ever for a Libertarian candidate in a gubernatorial election. In 2020, Donald Rainwater received 12% of the vote in a three-way race in Indiana. In 2002, Ed Thompson received 10% of the vote in a three-way race in Wisconsin.

=== Other statewide elections ===
In 2012, Mike Fellows received 43% of the vote in a two-way race in Montana for clerk of the Montana Supreme Court, the best ever for a Libertarian candidate in a statewide election. In 2008, John Monds received 33% of the vote in a race in Georgia for Georgia Public Service Commission, joining William Strange (running for Texas Court of Criminal Appeals) that same year as the first Libertarians to ever to receive more than one million votes. Two later candidates for the same position, David Staples in 2012 and Eric Hoskins in 2016, received 34% and 33% of the vote, respectively. In the 2026 general election, the Libertarian Party of Arkansas fielded 18 candidates. They received 786,339 votes, with an average percentage of 16.1%. By both of these measures, it was the best performance by Libertarian candidates since the party first appeared on the Arkansas ballot in 2012. Colt Shelby earned over 7.5% of the vote, exceeding the 3% threshold for party recognition in Arkansas, allowing Libertarian Party to become an established political party in the state. All of Arkansas's statewide and federal candidates exceeded 3% of the votes in their races, with candidates for Lieutenant Governor, Michael Kalagias, and for Land Commissioner, Christopher Olson, both received 36% of the vote, a new record for Libertarian candidates running for statewide constitutional office.

=== State Senate elections ===
In 2018, Laura Ebke received 44% of the vote in a non-partisan race in Nebraska's 32nd Legislative district in the Nebraska Legislature, the best ever for a Libertarian candidate in a state senate election. Also in 2018, Bobbi Hicks received 38% of the vote in a race in Arkansas's 10th Senate district in the Arkansas Senate, the best ever for a Libertarian candidate in a partisan state senate election.

== Legend ==
Abbreviations and their definitions
Abbrev.	Definition
SE	Special election, or an election held to fill a political office that has become vacant between regularly scheduled elections.
BP	Blanket primary, or a primary where all candidates from all parties are on the same ballot, and those candidates that net the highest number of votes among those candidates of their own party advance to the general election.
RE	Recall election, a procedure by which voters can remove an elected official from office through a direct vote before his or her term has ended.
W/I	Write-in candidate, with the abbreviation marked next to the vote total. These candidates did not appear upon the election ballot but were still eligible to receive votes by voters writing in the candidate's name.
(*)	The candidate, while a member of the party, was for some reason or another not able to get onto the ballot as a Libertarian.

== Elections of party officers ==
=== National committee chairman and vice-chairman ===
2008 National Committee Chairman balloting			2008 National Committee Vice-Chairman balloting	
Candidates	1st	2nd	Candidates	1st
Bill Redpath	183	204	Mike Jingozian	224
Ruth Bennett	113	147	Chuck Moulton	137
Ernest Hancock	71	-	None	6
None	2	4		
JR Enfield	-	1		
Vote total	369	356	Vote totals	367
Needed to nominate	185	178	Needed to nominate	184

2010 National Committee Chairman balloting				2010 National Committee Vice-Chairman balloting	
Candidates	1st	2nd	3rd	Candidates	1st
Mark Hinkle	114	208	281	Mark Rutherford	285
Wayne Allyn Root	201	223	228	Carolyn Marbry	201
Ernest Hancock	82	89	-		
John Jay Myers	70	-	-		
George Phillies	56	-	-		
None	10	9	19		
Vote total	533	529	528	Vote totals	490
Needed to nominate	267	265	265	Needed to nominate	246

2012 National Committee Chairman balloting									2012 National Committee Vice-Chairman balloting	
Candidates	1st	2nd	2nd Adjusted	2nd Revote	3rd	4th	5th	6th	Candidates	1st
Geoff Neale	-	-	-	-	149	167	212	264	R. Lee Wrights	228
Mark Rutherford	228	269	270	278	153	155	205	5	Bill Redpath	179
None	101	273	266	277	13	12	29	159	George Phillies	20
Mark Hinkle	221	-	-	-	-	-	-	-	None	6
Bill Redpath	1	-	-	-	128	119	-	-	Mark Rutherford	1
Jennifer Lopez	-	-	-	-	-	2	2	-		
Emma Dearest	-	-	-	-	-	2	-	-		
Sam Sloan	-	-	-	1	-	-	-	-		
Total vote	551	542	536	556	473	457	448	428	Total vote	434
Needed to nominate	276	272	269	278	237	229	225	215	Needed to nominate	218

Other 2012 Chairman candidates were:

- R. Lee Wrights (withdrew his name from consideration)
- Chuck Moulton (declined to be nominated)
- Wes Wagner (declined to be nominated)
- Jim Lark (declined to be nominated)
- Ernie Hancock (didn't receive votes)

Other 2012 Vice-Chairman candidates were:

- Mark Rutherford (declined to be nominated)

== Federal elections ==
=== President ===
Year	Presidential nominee	Home state	Previous positions	Vice presidential nominee	Home state	Previous positions	Votes	Notes
1972	John Hospers	California	Philosopher	Tonie Nathan	Oregon	Radio producer	3,674 (nil%); 1 EV	
1976	Roger MacBride	Virginia	Member of the Vermont House of Representatives (1963–1965); Candidate for Governor of Vermont (1964)	David Bergland	California	Nominee for Attorney General of California (1974)	172,553 (0.2%); 0 EV	
1980	Ed Clark	California	Candidate for Governor of California (1978)	David Koch	New York	Businessman	921,128 (1.1%); 0 EV	
1984	David Bergland	California	Nominee for Vice President of the United States (1976); Chair of the Libertarian National Committee (1977–1981); Nominee for California's 38th State Senate district (1978); Nominee for United States Senator from California (1980)	James A. Lewis	Connecticut	Member of the Libertarian National Committee (1981–1983); Nominee for United States Senator from Connecticut (1982)	228,111 (0.2%); 0 EV	
1988	Ron Paul (campaign)	Texas	Member of the United States House of Representatives from Texas's 22nd district (1976–1977; 1979–1985); Candidate for United States Senator from Texas (1984)	Andre Marrou	Alaska	Member of the Alaska House of Representatives (1985–1987)	431,750 (0.5%); 0 EV	
1992	Andre Marrou	Alaska	Member of the Alaska House of Representatives (1985–1987); Nominee for Vice President of the United States (1988)	Nancy Lord	Nevada	Nominee for Mayor of the District of Columbia (1990)	290,087 (0.3%); 0 EV	
1996	Harry Browne	Tennessee	Writer	Jo Jorgensen	South Carolina	Academic; Nominee for South Carolina's 4th congressional district (1992)	485,759 (0.5%); 0 EV	
2000	Harry Browne (campaign)	Tennessee	Nominee for President of the United States (1996)	Art Olivier	California	Nominee for California's 54th State Assembly district (1990); Member of the Bellflower City Council (1994–1999); Mayor of Bellflower (1998–1999)	384,431 (0.4%); 0 EV	
2004	Michael Badnarik (campaign)	Texas	Nominee for Texas's 47th State House of Representatives district (2000); Nominee for Texas's 48th State House district (2002)	Richard Campagna	Iowa	Nominee for Lieutenant Governor of Iowa (2002)	397,265 (0.3%); 0 EV	
2008	Bob Barr (campaign)	Georgia	United States Attorney for the Northern District of Georgia (1986–1990); Member of the United States House of Representatives from Georgia's 7th district (1995–2003)	Wayne Allyn Root	Nevada	Radio host Candidate for the 8th district of the Westchester County Board of Legislators (1983)	523,713 (0.4%); 0 EV	
2012	Gary Johnson (campaign)	New Mexico	Governor of New Mexico (1995–2003)	Jim Gray	California	Nominee for United States Senator from California (2004); Member of the Libertarian Party Judicial Committee (2010–2012)	1,275,923 (1.0%); 0 EV	
2016	Gary Johnson (campaign)	New Mexico	Governor of New Mexico (1995–2003); Nominee for President of the United States (2012)	Bill Weld	New York	United States Attorney for the District of Massachusetts (1981–1986); United States Assistant Attorney General for the Criminal Division (1986–1988); Governor of Massachusetts (1991–1997); Republican nominee for United States Senator from Massachusetts (1996); Candidate for Governor of New York (2006)	4,489,233 (3.3%); 0 EV; 1 EV for Ron Paul (Note: Texas faithless elector Bill Greene cast his vote for Ron Paul, a member of the Libertarian Party.)	
2020	Jo Jorgensen (campaign)	South Carolina	Academic; Nominee for Vice President of the United States (1996)	Spike Cohen	South Carolina	Podcaster and businessman	1,865,724 (1.2%); 0 EV	
2024	Chase Oliver (campaign)	Georgia	Sales account executive Nominee for United States Senator from Georgia (2022)	Mike ter Maat	Virginia	Economist; Nominee for Florida's 20th congressional district (2022)	650,126 (0.4%); 0 EV	

== Presidential ballot access ==
Historically, Libertarians have achieved presidential candidate ballot access in all 50 states and DC six times: 1980, 1992, 1996, 2000, 2016, and 2020. (In 2000, L. Neil Smith was on the Arizona ballot instead of the nominee, Harry Browne) That level of ballot access has only been achieved by a third-party candidate four other times (John Anderson in 1980, Lenora Fulani in 1988, and Ross Perot in 1992 and 1996.) Although the territory of Guam has no electoral votes, it began holding presidential preference elections in 1980. The Libertarian Party presidential candidate has appeared on the ballot in Guam in every election from 1980 through 2020, except for 2016. Anderson and Fulani were also on the ballot in Guam.

The following is a table comparison of ballot status for the Libertarian Party presidential nominee from 1972 to 2024. In some instances the candidate appeared on the ballot as an independent.

	1972	1976	1980	1984	1988	1992	1996	2000	2004	2008	2012	2016	2020	2024
States	2	31 (and D.C.)	50 (and D.C.)	38 (and D.C.)	46 (and D.C.)	50 (and D.C.)	50 (and D.C.)	50 (and D.C.)	48 (and D.C.)	45	48 (and D.C.)	50 (and D.C.)	50 (and D.C.)	47
Electoral votes	16	348	538	403	496	538	538	538	527	503	515	538	538	477
% of population (EVs)	3% (15%)	65% (79%)	100%	75% (81%)	92% (97%)	100%	100%	100%	98% (99%)	93% (94%)	96% (99%)	100%	100%	88% (100%)
Alabama	Not on ballot	On ballot												
Alaska	Not on ballot	On ballot												
Arizona	Not on ballot	On ballot												
Arkansas	Not on ballot		On ballot											
California	Write-in	On ballot												
Colorado	On ballot													
Connecticut	Not on ballot		On ballot	Not on ballot	On ballot					Not on ballot	On ballot			
Delaware	Not on ballot		On ballot											
Florida	Not on ballot	Write-in	On ballot	Write-in	On ballot									
Georgia	Not on ballot	Write-in	On ballot	Write-in	On ballot									
Hawaii	Not on ballot	On ballot												
Idaho	Not on ballot	On ballot												
Illinois	Not on ballot	On ballot												Write-in
Indiana	Not on ballot		On ballot		Not on ballot	On ballot								
Iowa	Not on ballot	On ballot												
Kansas	Not on ballot	On ballot												
Kentucky	Not on ballot	On ballot		Not on ballot	On ballot									
Louisiana	Not on ballot	On ballot								Not on ballot	On ballot			
Maine	Write-in		On ballot	Not on ballot	On ballot					Write-in	On ballot			
Maryland	Not on ballot		On ballot											
Massachusetts	Write-in		On ballot	Not on ballot	On ballot									
Michigan	Not on ballot	On ballot									Write-in	On ballot		
Minnesota	Not on ballot	On ballot												
Mississippi	Not on ballot	On ballot												
Missouri	Not on ballot		On ballot	Not on ballot	Write-in	On ballot								
Montana	Not on ballot		On ballot											
Nebraska	Not on ballot	On ballot												
Nevada	Not on ballot	On ballot												
New Hampshire	Not on ballot	On ballot												
New Jersey	Not on ballot	On ballot												
New Mexico	Not on ballot	On ballot												
New York	Not on ballot	On ballot												Write-in
North Carolina	Not on ballot	On ballot			Write-in	On ballot								
North Dakota	Not on ballot	On ballot												
Ohio	Not on ballot	On ballot												
Oklahoma	Not on ballot		On ballot						Not on ballot			On ballot		
Oregon	Not on ballot		On ballot	Not on ballot	On ballot									
Pennsylvania	Not on ballot		On ballot											
Rhode Island	Write-in	On ballot												
South Carolina	Not on ballot		On ballot											
South Dakota	Not on ballot	On ballot		Not on ballot	On ballot									
Tennessee	Not on ballot	On ballot												Write-in
Texas	Not on ballot	Write-in	On ballot	Not on ballot	On ballot									
Utah	Not on ballot	On ballot												
Vermont	Not on ballot	Write-in	On ballot											
Virginia	Not on ballot	On ballot		Not on ballot	On ballot									
Washington	On ballot													
West Virginia	Not on ballot		On ballot	Not on ballot		On ballot				Not on ballot	On ballot			
Wisconsin	Not on ballot	On ballot												
Wyoming	Not on ballot	Write-in	On ballot											
District of Columbia	Not on ballot	On ballot								Not on ballot	On ballot			Write-in

=== Presidential and vice presidential nominations ===
Candidates seeking to win the Libertarian Party nominations either for president or vice president must gather thirty "tokens", or supporting delegates, and their votes in order to be put onto the actual nominating ballot. However, that still does not prevent write-in votes when the balloting is being held.

==== 1996 ====
1996 Libertarian presidential nomination vote		1996 Libertarian vice presidential nomination vote	
Candidates	1st ballot	Candidates	1st ballot
Harry Browne	416	Jo Jorgensen	459
Rick Tompkins	74	None	36
None	60		
Irwin Schiff	32		
Doug Ohmen	20		
Scatter	3		
Total vote	605	Total vote	495
Needed to nominate	303	Needed to nominate	248

Note: Jo Jorgensen was nominated by a voice vote.

==== 2000 ====
2000 Libertarian presidential nomination vote		2000 Libertarian vice presidential nomination vote		
Candidates	1st ballot	Candidates	1st ballot	2nd ballot
Harry Browne	493	Art Olivier	333	418
Don Gorman	166	Steve Kubby	303	338
Jacob G. Hornberger	120	Ken Krawchuk	70	-
Barry Hess	53	Don Gorman	29	-
None	23	None	10	-
Dave Hollist	8	Gail Lightfoot	7	-
Scatter	6	Scatter	7	-
L. Neil Smith	5			
Richard Boddie	2			
George W. Bush	1			
Russell Means	1			
Total vote	877	Total vote	759	756
Needed to nominate	439	Needed to nominate	380	379

==== 2004 ====
2004 Libertarian presidential nomination vote					2004 Libertarian vice presidential nomination vote		
Candidates	Token count	1st ballot	2nd ballot	3rd ballot	Candidates	Token count	1st ballot
Michael Badnarik	89	256	249	423	Richard Campagna	40	353
Aaron Russo	63	258	285	344	Tamara Millay	40	220
Gary Nolan	107	246	244	-	Garrett Hayes	40	36
None	-	10	5	11	None	-	10
Jeffrey Diket	72	4	-	-	Scott Jameson	39	7
Drew Carey	-	3	-	-			
Dave Hollist	39	1	-	-			
Jim Burns	72	-	-	-			
Total vote	513	778	783	778	Total vote	159	626
Needed to nominate	30	390	392	390	Needed to nominate	30	314

Note: Jim Burns withdrew himself from consideration four hours before the balloting for the presidential nomination began.

Detailed map on the 1st ballot for the 2004 presidential nomination by individual state delegations

Detailed map on the 2nd ballot for the 2004 presidential nomination by individual state delegations

Detailed map on the 3rd and final ballot for the 2004 presidential nomination by individual state delegations

Detailed map on the 1st and only ballot for the 2004 vice presidential nomination by individual state delegations

==== 2008 ====
2008 Libertarian presidential nomination vote								2008 Libertarian vice presidential nomination vote		
Candidates	Token count	1st ballot	2nd ballot	3rd ballot	4th ballot	5th ballot	6th Ballot	Candidates	1st ballot	2nd ballot
Bob Barr	94	153	188	186	202	229	324	Wayne Allyn Root	276	289
Mary Ruwart	94	152	162	186	202	223	276	Steve Kubby	209	259
Wayne Allyn Root	94	123	138	146	149	165	-	Dan Williams	40	10
Mike Gravel	67	71	73	78	76	-	-	Jim Burns	20	-
George Phillies	62	49	36	31	-	-	-	Gail Lightfoot	15	-
Steve Kubby	60	41	32	-	-	-	-	Leonard Schwartz	1	-
Michael Jingozian	63	23	1	-	-	-	-	None	2	6
Christine Smith	36	6	-	-	-	-	-	Mary Ruwart	1	1
None	-	2	1	2	3	6	26	Mike Ferguson	1	1
Ron Paul	-	6	3	1	-	-	1	Richard	-	1
Penn Jillette	-	3	-	-	-	-	-			
William Koehler	-	1	-	-	-	-	-			
Daniel Imperato	-	1	-	-	-	-	-			
Jesse Ventura	-	-	1	-	-	-	-			
Stephen Kolbert	-	-	1	-	-	-	-			
Ralph Nader	-	-	-	-	-	-	1			
Total vote	?	631	636	630	632	623	628	Total vote	565	567
Needed to nominate	30	316	319	316	317	312	315	Needed to nominate	283	284

Detailed map on the 1st ballot for the 2008 presidential nomination by individual state delegations

Detailed map on the 2nd ballot for the 2008 presidential nomination by individual state delegations

Detailed map on the 3rd ballot for the 2008 presidential nomination by individual state delegations

Detailed map on the 4th ballot for the 2008 presidential nomination by individual state delegations

Detailed map on the 5th ballot for the 2008 presidential nomination by individual state delegations

Detailed map on the 6th and final ballot for the 2008 presidential nomination by individual state delegations

Detailed map on the 1st ballot for the 2008 vice presidential nomination by individual state delegations

Detailed map on the 2nd and final ballot for the 2008 vice presidential nomination by individual state delegations

==== 2012 ====
2012 Libertarian presidential nomination vote			2012 Libertarian vice presidential nomination vote		
Candidates	Token count	1st ballot	Candidates	Token count	1st ballot
Gary Johnson	264	419	Jim Gray	242	357
R. Lee Wrights	127	152	R. Lee Wrights	120	229
Jim Burns	35	12	None	-	7
Carl Person	31	3	Jim Burns	31	6
Sam Sloan	12	2	Sam Sloan	10	1
Max Abramson	-	2	Gary Johnson	6	-
Ron Paul	1	1	Carl Person	3	-
Wayne Allyn Root	-	1	Pat Dixon	2	-
Rita Nunez Neumann	4	-	Rita Nunez Neumann	2	-
James Ogle	2	-	James Ogle	2	-
Jim Duensing	1	-	Wayne Allyn Root	2	-
Roger Gary	1	-	Roger Gary	1	-
James P. Gray	1	-	Lenore Hawkins	1	-
Lori Sunthonchart	1	-	Jim Jones	1	-
Joy Waymire	1	-	Steve Mankowski	1	-
			John Monds	1	-
			Bill Redpath	1	-
			Joy Waymire	1	-
Total vote	481	595	Total vote	427	600
Needed to nominate	30	298	Needed to nominate	30	301

Detailed map on the 2012 vote for the presidential nomination by individual state delegations

Detailed map on the 2012 vote for the vice presidential nomination by individual state delegations

==== 2016 ====
2016 Libertarian presidential nomination vote			2016 Libertarian vice presidential nomination vote		
Candidates	Token count	1st ballot	Candidates	Token count	1st ballot
Gary Johnson	458	518	Bill Weld	426	441
Austin Petersen	197	203	Larry Sharpe	264	409
John McAfee	131	131	None	6	12
Darryl Perry	63	52	Derrick Grayson	48	9
Marc A. Feldman	58	18	Mary Ruwart		1
None	5	2	Alicia Dearn	29	
Kevin McCormick	9	1	Daniel Hogan	1	
Derrick Grayson	1	1	Austin Petersen	1	
Michael Shannon		1	Gary Johnson	1	
Rhett Smith		1			
Ron Paul	1				
Vermin Supreme	1				
Heidi Zemen	1				
Total Vote	925	928	Total Vote	869	872
Needed to Nominate	30	465	Needed to Nominate	30	437

Map of the 2016 vote for the presidential nomination. First place by delegate votes. Gary Johnson (36) Austin Petersen (9) John McAfee (3) No vote (1) Tie (4)

==== 2020 ====
2020 Libertarian presidential nomination vote						2020 Libertarian vice presidential nomination vote				
Candidates	Token count	1st ballot	2nd ballot	3rd ballot	4th ballot	Candidates	Token count	1st ballot	2nd ballot	3rd ballot
Jo Jorgensen	193	248	339	390	524	Spike Cohen	302	416	474	533
Jacob Hornberger	218	236	257	264	285	John Monds	296	322	432	472
Vermin Supreme	103	171	184	188	206	Ken Armstrong	115	180	96	1
John Monds	95	147	169	174	1	Adam Kokesh	69	87	4	3
Jim Gray	89	98	64			None		7	12	10
Adam Kokesh	58	77	6	1	1	John McAfee	6	3		
None		8	6	7	4	Nicholas Sarwark	20	3		
Nicholas Sarwark	6	5	1	1	1	Justin Amash		1	1	
Sorinne Ardeleanu	9	2			1	Sorinne Ardeleanu		1	1	1
John Ammens					1	Julian Assange		1	1	
Ryan Graham					1	Rhett Boogie		1		
Godzilla					1	Michael Cordova				1
Laura Ebke				1		Laura Ebke		1		
Justin Amash	27	17	1			Michael Kalagias		1		
Darryl Perry			1			Ron Paul	2		1	1
Arvin Vohra	27	3				Edward Snowden		1	2	
Edward Snowden		2				Chris Spangle			2	
Rhett Boogie		1				Vermin Supreme	7	1		
Lincoln Chafee		1				Larry Sharpe	21			
John Stossel		1				Zoltan Istvan	7			
Dan Behrman	18					Jim Gray	6			
Sam Robb	14					Sam Robb	5			
Kim Ruff	11					Tulsi Gabbard	2			
Spike Cohen	7					Michael Heise	2			
Larry Sharpe	4									
Total Vote	879	1,017	1,028	1,206	1,026	Total Vote	874	1,024	1,025	1,022
Needed to Nominate	30	509	515	514	514	Needed to Nominate	30	513	513	512

Map of the first ballot for the 2020 presidential nomination by first place in state delegations. Jo Jorgensen (18) Jacob Hornberger (11) John Monds (6) Vermin Supreme (4) Jim Gray (3) Justin Amash (1) Tie (8)

Map of the second ballot for the 2020 presidential nomination by first place in state delegations. Jo Jorgensen (23) Jacob Hornberger (10) John Monds (7) Vermin Supreme (3) Jim Gray (2) Tie (6)

Map of the third ballot for the 2020 presidential nomination by first place in state delegations. Jo Jorgensen (30) Jacob Hornberger (10) John Monds (4) Vermin Supreme (1) Tie (6)

Map of the fourth and final ballot for the 2020 presidential nomination by first place in state delegations. Jo Jorgensen (39) Jacob Hornberger (9) Vermin Supreme (2) Tie (1)

=== The Senate ===
==== Class I seats ====
Arizona Libertarian Party Senate Class I candidates
Year	Nominee	# votes	% votes	Place	Notes
1976	Allan Norwitz	7,310	1.0 / 100	4th of 5	
1982	Randall Clamons	20,100	2.8 / 100	3rd of 3	
1988	Rick Tompkins	20,849	1.8 / 100	3rd of 4	
1994	Scott Grainger	75,493	6.8 / 100	3rd of 3	
2000	Barry Hess	70,724	5.1 / 100	4th of 4	
2006	Richard Mack	48,231	3.2 / 100	3rd of 3	
2012	Marc Victor	102,109	4.6 / 100	3rd of 3	

California Libertarian Party Senate Class I candidates
Year	Nominee	# votes	% votes	Place	Notes
1976	Lynn Kinsky	907 (W/I)	0 / 100	6th of 9	
1982	Joseph Fuhrig	107,720	1.4 / 100	3rd of 5	
1988	Jack Dean	79,997	0.8 / 100	4th of 5	
1992 SE	Richard B. Boddie	247,799	2.3 / 100	5th of 5	
1994	Richard B. Boddie	179,100	2.1 / 100	4th of 5	
2000	Gail K. Lightfoot	187,718	1.8 / 100	4th of 5	
2006	Michael Metti	133,851	1.6 / 100	4th of 6	
2012 BP	Gail K. Lightfoot	101,648	2.1 / 100	9th of 24	
2018 BP	Derrick M. Reid	59,999	0.9 / 100	15th of 32	

Connecticut Libertarian Party Senate Class I candidates
Year	Nominee	# votes	% votes	Place	Notes
1982	James A. Lewis	8,163	0.8 / 100	4th of 4	
1988	Howard A. Grayson Jr.	12,409	0.9 / 100	3rd of 4	
2000	Wildey J. Moore	8,773	0.7 / 100	4th of 4	
2012	Paul Passarelli	25,045	1.7 / 100	3rd of 3	
2018	Richard Lion	8,838	0.6 / 100	3rd of 3	

Massachusetts Libertarian Party Senate Class I candidates
Year	Nominee	# votes	% votes	Place	Notes
1982	Howard S. Katz	18,878	0.9 / 100	3rd of 3	
1988	Freda Lee Nason	13,199	0.5 / 100	4th of 4	
1994	Lauraleigh Dozier	14,484	0.7 / 100	3rd of 4	
2000	Carla Howell	308,748	11.9 / 100	3rd of 6	
2010 SE	Joseph L. Kennedy	22,388	1.0 / 100	3rd of 3	

Montana Libertarian Party Senate Class I candidates
Year	Nominee	# votes	% votes	Place	Notes
1982	Larry Dodge	12,412	3.9 / 100	3rd of 3	

Nevada Libertarian Party Senate Class I candidates
Year	Nominee	# votes	% votes	Place	Notes
1976	Dan Becan	2,307	1.1 / 100	5th of 5	
1988	James Frye	5,523	1.6 / 100	4th of 4	
1994	Bob Days	5,964	1.6 / 100	5th of 6	
2000	J. J. Johnson	5,395	0.9 / 100	5th of 7	
2006	Brenda Trainer	5,269	0.9 / 100	5th of 5	
2018	Tim Hagan	9,196	1.0 / 100	4th of 5	

New Mexico Libertarian Party Senate Class I candidates
Year	Nominee	# votes	% votes	Place	Notes
2018	Gary Johnson	107,201	15.4 / 100	3rd of 3	

Texas Libertarian Party Senate Class I candidates
Year	Nominee	# votes	% votes	Place	Notes
1982	John E. Ford	23,494	0.8 / 100	3rd of 4	
1988	Jeff Daiell	44,572	0.8 / 100	3rd of 3	
1994	Pierre Blondeau	36,107	0.8 / 100	3rd of 3	
2000	Mary J. Ruwart	72,657	1.2 / 100	4th of 4	
2006	Scott L. Jameson	97,672	2.3 / 100	3rd of 3	
2012	John J. Myers	162,354	2.1 / 100	3rd of 4	
2018	Neal Dikeman	65,470	0.8 / 100	3rd of 3	

==== Class II seats ====
Alaska Libertarian Party Senate Class II candidates
Year	Nominee	# votes	% votes	Place	Notes
2002	Leonard J. Karpinski	2,354	1.0 / 100	5th of 5	
2008	Fredrick D. Haase	2,483	0.8 / 100	4th of 5	
2014	Mark Fish	10,512	3.7 / 100	3rd of 4	

Arkansas Libertarian Party Senate Class II candidates
Year	Nominee	# votes	% votes	Place	Notes
2014	Nathan LaFrance	17,210	2.0 / 100	3rd of 4	
2020	Ricky Dale Harrington Jr.	399,390	33.5 / 100	2nd of 2	

Kansas Libertarian Party Senate Class II candidates
Year	Nominee	# votes	% votes	Place	Notes
1984	Douglas N. Merritt	6,755	0.7 / 100	5th of 6	
1996	Steven Rosile	13,098	1.3 / 100	4th of 4	
2002	Steven Rosile	70,725	9.1 / 100	2nd of 3	
2008	Randall L. Hodgkinson	25,727	2.1 / 100	3rd of 4	
2014	Randall Batson	37,469	4.3 / 100	3rd of 3	
2020	Jason Buckley	68,263	5.0 / 100	3rd of 3	

Massachusetts Libertarian Party Senate Class II candidates
Year	Nominee	# votes	% votes	Place	Notes
2002	Michael Cloud	369,807	18.4 / 100	2nd of 2	
2008	Robert J. Underwood	93,713	3.1 / 100	3rd of 3	

Texas Libertarian Party Senate Class II candidates
Year	Nominee	# votes	% votes	Place	Notes
1990	Gary Johnson	89,089	2.4 / 100	3rd of 3	
1996	Michael Bird	51,516	0.9 / 100	3rd of 4	
2002	Scott Jameson	35,538	0.8 / 100	3rd of 4	
2008	Yvonne Adams Schick	185,241	2.3 / 100	3rd of 3	
2014	Rebecca Paddock	133,751	2.9 / 100	3rd of 4	
2020	Kerry McKennon	209,722	1.9 / 100	3rd of 5	

==== Class III seats ====
Alaska Libertarian Party Senate Class III candidates
Year	Nominee	# votes	% votes	Place	Notes
1986 BP	Chuck House	4,265	2.9 / 100	3rd of 7	
1986	Chuck House	3,161	1.8 / 100	3rd of 3	
1998 BP	Scott A. Kohlhaas	1,987	1.9 / 100	6th of 6	
1998	Scott A. Kohlhaas	5,046	2.3 / 100	4th of 4	
2004 BP	Scott A. Kohlhaas	402	0.9 / 100	6th of 7	
2004	Scott A. Kohlhaas	1,240	0.4 / 100	6th of 7	
2010 BP	Fredrick D. Haase	5,793	16.1 / 100	2nd of 4	
2010	Fredrick D. Haase	1,459	0.6 / 100	4th of 6	
2016	Joe Miller	85,833	29.4 / 100	2nd of 4	

California Libertarian Party Senate Class III candidates
Year	Nominee	# votes	% votes	Place	Notes
1974	Bill White	791 (W/I)	0 / 100	5th of 9	
1980	David Bergland	202,481	2.4 / 100	3rd of 5	
1986	Breck McKinley	66,261	0.9 / 100	4th of 5	
1992	June R. Genis	235,919	2.2 / 100	5th of 5	
1998	Ted Brown	93,959	1.1 / 100	3rd of 7	
2004	Jim Gray	216,522	1.8 / 100	4th of 5	
2010	Gail K. Lightfoot	175,242	1.8 / 100	3rd of 6	

Indiana Libertarian Party Senate Class III candidates
Year	Nominee	# votes	% votes	Place	Notes
1986	Bradford Warren	8,314	0.5 / 100	3rd of 4	
1992	Steve Dillon	35,733	1.6 / 100	3rd of 4	
1998	Rebecca Sink-Burris	23,641	1.5 / 100	3rd of 3	
2004	Albert Barger	27,344	1.1 / 100	3rd of 3	
2010	Rebecca Sink-Burris	94,330	5.4 / 100	3rd of 3	
2016	Lucy Brenton	149,481	5.5 / 100	3rd of 4	

Nevada Libertarian Party Senate Class III candidates
Year	Nominee	# votes	% votes	Place	Notes
1980	Allen Hacker	6,920	2.8 / 100	3rd of 4	
1986	H. Kent Cromwell	4,899	1.9 / 100	4th of 4	
1992	H. Kent Cromwell	7,222	1.5 / 100	6th of 7	
1998	Michael Cloud	8,044	1.9 / 100	4th of 5	
2004	Tom Hurst	9,559	1.2 / 100	4th of 6	

=== House of Representatives ===
In April 2020, Representative Justin Amash from Michigan's 3rd congressional district became the first Libertarian member of Congress, after switching from the Republican Party and spending time as an independent. However, Amash has never been elected as a Libertarian, and did not seek re-election in 2020.

==== Overall summary ====
Libertarian Party U.S. House of Representatives elections
Year	Contests	# votes	% votes	Seats won	Notes
1972	1	2,028	0 / 100	0	
1974	1	3,099	0 / 100	0	
1976	37	71,791	0.1 / 100	0	
1978	20	64,310	0.1 / 100	0	
1980	112	568,131	0.7 / 100	0	
1982	148	462,767	0.7 / 100	0	
1984	97	275,865	0.3 / 100	0	
1986	47	121,076	0.2 / 100	0	
1988	90	445,708	0.6 / 100	0	
1990	47	396,131	0.6 / 100	0	
1992	111	848,614	0.9 / 100	0	
1994	76	415,944	0.6 / 100	0	
1996	157	651,448	0.7 / 100	0	
1998	129	880,024	1.2 / 100	0	
2000	132	1,610,292	1.6 / 100	0	
2004	214	1,050,766	0.9 / 100	0	
2006	116	656,794	0.8 / 100	0	
2008	125	1,083,096	0.9 / 100	0	
2010	158	1,010,891	1.2 / 100	0	
2012	136	1,366,338	1.1 / 100	0	
2014	121	954,077	1.2 / 100	0	
2016	119	1,661,199	1.3 / 100	0	
2018	98	758,942	0.7 / 100	0	
2020	119	1,098,989	0.7 / 100	0	

==== Alaska ====
Alaska Libertarian Party House of Representatives candidates
Year	District	Nominee	# votes	% votes	Place	Notes
1986	At-large	Betty Breck	4,182	2.3 / 100	3rd of 3	
2000	At-large	Len Karpinski	4,802	1.8 / 100	5th of 5	
2002	At-large	Rob Clift	3,797	1.7 / 100	4th of 4	
2004	At-large	Alvin Anders	7,157	2.4 / 100	4th of 4	
2006	At-large	Alexander Crawford	4,029	1.7 / 100	3rd of 5	
2012	At-large	Jim McDermott	15,028	5.2 / 100	3rd of 4	
2014	At-large	Jim McDermott	21,290	7.6 / 100	3rd of 3	
2016	At-large	Jim McDermott	31,770	10.3 / 100	3rd of 4	

==== Nevada ====
Nevada Libertarian Party House of Representatives candidates
Year	District	Nominee	# votes	% votes	Place	Notes
1976	At-large	Jim Burns	2,825	1.4 / 100	5th of 5	
1978	At-large	Linda West	6,029	3.2 / 100	4th of 4	
1980	At-large	Harry Joe Mangrum	7,759	3.2 / 100	4th of 4	
1984	1st	Joe Morris	1,885	1.4 / 100	3rd of 3	
1986	1st	Gordon M. Morris	2,145	1.9 / 100	3rd of 3	
1988	1st	Patrick O'Neill	3,724	2.3 / 100	3rd of 3	
1990	1st	William Moore	5,825	4.2 / 100	3rd of 3	
1992	1st	Scott A. Kjar	8,993	4.1 / 100	3rd of 3	
1994	1st	Gary Wood	6,065	4.0 / 100	3rd of 3	
1996	1st	James Dan	3,341	1.9 / 100	4th of 5	
1998	1st	Jim Burns	5,292	3.3 / 100	3rd of 4	
2000	1st	Charles E. Schneider	4,011	1.8 / 100	3rd of 5	
2004	1st	Jim Duensing	5,862	2.9 / 100	3rd of 3	
2006	1st	Jim Duensing	2,843	2.2 / 100	3rd of 4	
2008	1st	Jim Duensing	4,528	2.0 / 100	4th of 4	
2010	1st	Edward G. Klapproth	2,118	1.3 / 100	4th of 4	
2012	1st	William Pojunis	4,645	2.6 / 100	3rd of 4	

==== Washington ====
Washington Libertarian Party House of Representatives candidates
Year	District	Nominee	# votes	% votes	Place	Notes
2002	1st	Mark Wilson	6,251	3.1 / 100	3rd of 3	
2002	2nd	Bruce Guthrie	7,966	2.5 / 100	3rd of 4	
2002	5th	Rob Chase	10,379	5.1 / 100	3rd of 3	
2002	6th	John Bennett	8,744	4.5 / 100	3rd of 3	
2002	7th	Stan Lippman	8,447	4.0 / 100	3rd of 3	
2002	8th	Mark Taff	5,771	2.8 / 100	3rd of 3	
2002	9th	J. Mills	4,759	2.9 / 100	3rd of 3	
2004	1st	Charles Moore	5,798	1.8 / 100	3rd of 3	
2018	2nd	Brian Luke	84,646	28.7 / 100	2nd of 2	

== State elections ==
=== Gubernatorial elections ===
Alaska Libertarian Party gubernatorial candidates
Year	Nominee	# votes	% votes	Place	Notes
1982	Dick Randolph	29,067	14.9 / 100	3rd of 4	
1986 BP	Mary Jane O'Brannon	205	0.1 / 100	12th of 15	
1986	Mary Jane O'Brannon	1,050	0.6 / 100	5th of 5	
2002	Billy Toien	1,109	0.5 / 100	6th of 6	
2006	Billy Toien	682	0.3 / 100	5th of 6	
2010	Billy Toien	2,682	1.1 / 100	4th of 4	
2014	Carolyn Clift	8,985	3.2 / 100	3rd of 4	
2018	William Toien	5,402	1.9 / 100	4th of 4	

California Libertarian Party gubernatorial candidates
Year	Nominee	# votes	% votes	Place	Notes
1974	John Hospers	1,950 (W/I)	0 / 100	5th of 13	
1978	Ed Clark (*)	377,960	5.5 / 100	3rd of 5	
1982	Dan P. Dougherty	81,076	1.0 / 100	3rd of 5	
1986	Joseph Fuhrig	52,628	0.7 / 100	3rd of 5	
1990	Dennis Thompson	145,628	1.9 / 100	3rd of 5	
1994	Richard Rider	149,281	1.7 / 100	3rd of 5	
1998	Steve Kubby	73,845	0.9 / 100	4th of 7	
2002	Gary David Copeland	161,203	2.2 / 100	4th of 6	
2003 RE	Ned Roscoe	2,250	0 / 100	34th of 135	
2003 RE	Ken Hamidi	1,948	0 / 100	40th of 135	
2003 RE	John Hickey	1,689	0 / 100	48th of 135	
2006	Art Olivier	114,329	1.3 / 100	4th of 6	
2010	Dale Ogden	150,895	1.5 / 100	4th of 6	

Iowa Libertarian Party gubernatorial candidates
Year	Nominee	# votes	% votes	Place	Notes
1978	John Ball	3,947	0.5 / 100	3rd of 4	
1982	Marcia Farrington	3,307	0.3 / 100	3rd of 4	
1994	Carl Olsen	2,772	0.3 / 100	4th of 5	
2002	Clyde Cleveland	13,098	1.3 / 100	4th of 4	
2006	Kevin Litten	5,735	0.5 / 100	4th of 4	
2010	Eric Cooper	14,398	1.3 / 100	4th of 6	
2014	Lee Hieb	20,321	1.8 / 100	3rd of 5	
2018	Jake Porter	21,426	1.6 / 100	3rd of 4	

Nevada Libertarian Party gubernatorial candidates
Year	Nominee	# votes	% votes	Place	Notes
1978	John W. Grayson Jr.	1,487	0.8 / 100	5th of 5	
1982	Dan Becan	4,621	1.9 / 100	4th of 4	
1986	Louis R. Tomburello	2,555	1.0 / 100	4th of 4	
1990	James Frye	8,059	2.5 / 100	4th of 4	
1994	Dennis Sholty	3,978	1.1 / 100	5th of 5	
1998	Terry Savage	7,307	1.7 / 100	5th of 5	
2002	Dick Geyer	8,104	1.6 / 100	4th of 7	
2010	Arthur Forest Lampitt Jr.	4,672	0.7 / 100	6th of 8	
2018	Jared Lord	8,640	0.9 / 100	5th of 5	

New York Libertarian Party gubernatorial candidates
Year	Nominee	# votes	% votes	Place	Notes
1974	Jerome Tuccille	10,503	0.2 / 100	4th of 8	
1978	Gary Greenberg	18,990	0.4 / 100	4th of 7	
1982	John H. Northrup	16,913	0.3 / 100	4th of 7	
1990	W. Gary Johnson	24,611	0.6 / 100	6th of 7	
1994	Robert L. Schulz	9,506	0.2 / 100	5th of 6	
1998	Chris Garvey	4,722	0.1 / 100	9th of 10	
2002	Scott Jeffrey	5,013	0.1 / 100	8th of 8	
2006	John Clifton	14,736	0.3 / 100	4th of 6	
2010	Warren Redlich	48,359	1.0 / 100	4th of 7	
2014	Michael McDermott	16,769	0.4 / 100	4th of 5	
2018	Larry Sharpe	95,033	1.6 / 100	4th of 5	

== See also ==
- Libertarian Party (United States)
- List of Libertarian Party politicians who have held office in the United States
- History of the Libertarian Party (United States)
