= 1964 United States Senate election in Massachusetts =

- November 3, 1964
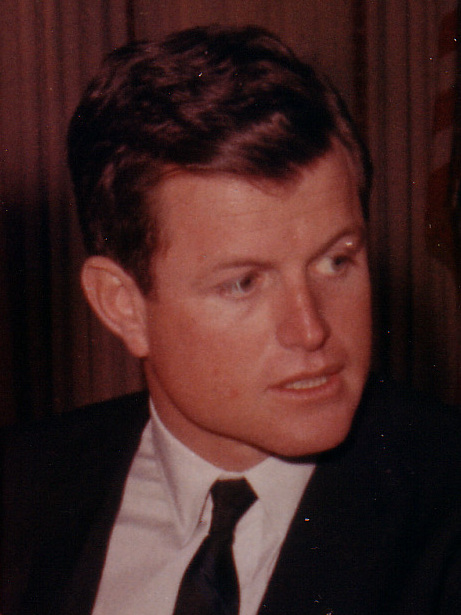

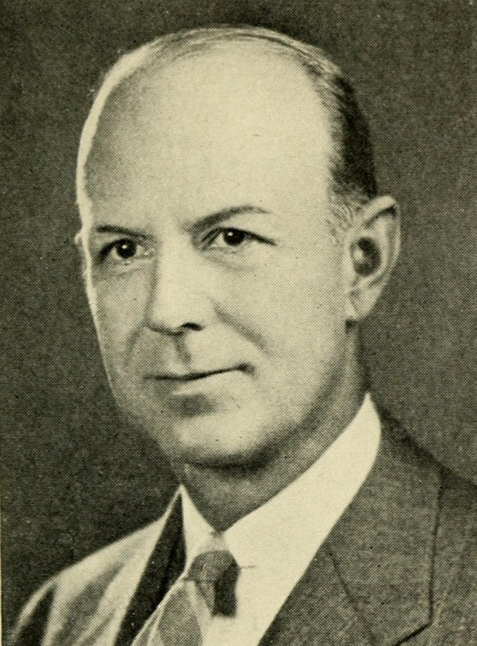
Nominee	Ted Kennedy	Howard J. Whitmore Jr.
Party	Democratic	Republican
Popular vote	1,716,907	587,663
Percentage	74.26%	25.42%
- Kennedy: 50–60% 60–70% 70–80% 80–90% Whitmore: 40–50% 50–60% 60–70%
U.S. senator before election
Ted Kennedy
Democratic
Elected U.S. Senator
Ted Kennedy
Democratic

The 1964 United States Senate election in Massachusetts was held on November 3, 1964, with the incumbent Democratic senator, Ted Kennedy, easily defeating his Republican challenger Howard J. Whitmore Jr.

The election coincided with the 1964 United States presidential election, which was won by incumbent Democrat Lyndon B. Johnson in a landslide, as well as the Senate election in neighboring New York which was won by Kennedy's older brother Robert. It took place less than a year after the assassination of the incumbent Senator's eldest surviving brother, President John F. Kennedy. The two surviving Kennedy brothers thus benefited from both an overall national swing to the Democrats and public sympathy following their brother's murder. Much of the campaign-appearance burden in Massachusetts on behalf of Ted Kennedy fell on his wife, Joan, because of Ted's serious back injury in a plane crash.

Ted Kennedy recorded his highest-ever percentage of the vote in this election, although he won a larger margin of victory against divided opposition in 2000.

== Democratic primary ==
=== Candidates ===
- Ted Kennedy, incumbent Senator since 1962

=== Results ===
Senator Kennedy was unopposed for renomination.

1964 Democratic U.S. Senate primary
Party	Candidate	Votes	%
Democratic	Ted Kennedy (incumbent)	608,791	99.99
Write-in	All others	32	0.01
Total votes		608,823	100.00

== Republican primary ==
=== Candidates ===
- Howard J. Whitmore Jr., former State Representative and mayor of Newton

=== Results ===
Whitmore was unopposed for the Republican nomination.

1964 Republican U.S. Senate primary
Party	Candidate	Votes	%
Republican	Howard J. Whitmore Jr.	172,078	99.95%
Write-in	All others	86	0.05%
Total votes		172,164	100.00%

== General election ==
=== Candidates ===
- Lawrence Gilfedder, perennial candidate (Socialist Workers)
- Ted Kennedy, incumbent Senator since 1962 (Democratic)
- Grace F. Luder, candidate for Congress in 1950 and 1952 (Prohibition)
- Howard J. Whitmore Jr., former State Representative and mayor of Newton (Republican)

=== Results ===
1964 U.S. Senate election
Party	Candidate	Votes	%	±%
Democratic	Ted Kennedy (incumbent)	1,716,907	74.26	▲21.30
Republican	Howard J. Whitmore Jr.	587,663	25.42	▼19.08
Socialist Labor	Lawrence Gilfedder	4,745	0.21	▼0.03
Prohibition	Grace F. Luder	2,700	0.12	▲0.05
Write-in	All others	13	0.00	
Total votes		2,312,028	100.00	

== See also ==
- United States Senate elections, 1964
