= Carla Howell =

American politician and activist (born 1955)

Carla Howell (born 1955) is an American politician, small government advocate and activist. She was the Libertarian Party of Massachusetts candidate for Massachusetts State Auditor in 1998, U.S. Senate in 2000, and Governor in 2002. She then served in multiple leadership positions in the U.S. Libertarian Party. She has also organized tax-cut initiative ballot measures in Massachusetts and worked for the Libertarian National Committee.

== Early life and education ==
Howell is the daughter of Carla (née Winsor) and Charles Howell, the third of their five children. She is a great-granddaughter of William Eustis Russell, a former governor of Massachusetts. Her father worked as a business executive, and her mother engaged in volunteer work in the community. As a result of her father's work, the family left Massachusetts. She attended high school in Detroit and Pittsburgh, graduating from Fox Chapel High School in Pittsburgh at age 16.

She attended Bethany College in West Virginia for mathematics and computer science, and after graduating, became a systems engineer at Westinghouse Electric. She began work at Computervision in 1981 and became the head of an engineering division in 1984. After a decade of engineering work, she then became a consultant in the Boston area for the high-tech and health care industry. She earned her MBA from Babson College in Wellesley, Massachusetts in 1986.

== Political career ==
Howell joined the Libertarian Party of Massachusetts in 1994 and was elected chair of the state party three years later. She ran for Massachusetts State Auditor on the Libertarian Party ticket in 1998, and was endorsed by the Boston Herald. She received 102,198 votes, 5.3 percent of the total, which according to the Associated Press, "guarantee[d] the party's official status."

She was the Libertarian candidate for 2000 United States Senate election in Massachusetts against Democrat incumbent Edward M. Kennedy and Republican Jack Robinson III. Her campaign slogan was "small government is beautiful". She had raised almost $700,000 by October, while Robinson had raised about $20,000. She placed third, with more than 308,000 votes, which was 12 percent of the total, just one percent behind Robinson. While reporting on the Massachusetts Libertarian Party convention in 2001, Rick Klein of the Boston Globe wrote that the 2000 election "made Howell the state party's standard-bearer - and something of a hero to Bay State Libertarians", reporting that she received standing ovations before and after her speech to the attendees.

She was the Libertarian candidate in the 2002 Massachusetts gubernatorial election. At the time of her campaign, she was the chair of the Committee For Small Government. Her campaign platform included a plan to reduce the state budget by half, support for gun rights, and a repeal of the state income tax. She and other minor candidates were not included in a gubernatorial candidate debate, and their requests for an injunction were denied. She received 23,044 votes, just over one percent of the total.

She was the executive director of the Libertarian Party of the United States during the 2012 election. She worked as its political director in 2016. She was a staff member in the Libertarian National Committee from December 2011 until June 2017.

=== Ballot initiatives ===
Howell spearheaded initiatives to repeal the Massachusetts state personal income tax in 2002 and 2008. She sponsored 2002 Statewide Ballot Question 1, an initiative petition to end the income tax in Massachusetts. The measure received 45% of the vote, which Peter DeMarco, writing for the Boston Globe, described as "eye-popping".

She and co-chair Michael Cloud, re-established the Committee For Small Government in 2007. The organization obtained enough petition signatures to put the issue on the ballot again as Statewide Ballot Question 1. The 2008 initiative differed from the 2002 initiative in that it provided a one-year transition period with a tax rate of 2.65% before the tax rate would drop to zero. This measure received only received 30%, but had a higher raw vote total than in 2002.

She filed four petitions in 2010 to create ballot measures to reduce sales taxes, and Republican Christy Mihos, who was running for Massachusetts governor at the time, also sponsored the initiatives. Howell headed the Alliance to Roll Back Taxes, sponsor of a ballot initiative to cut the Massachusetts sales tax from 6.25% to 3.0%, which was on November 2, 2010, ballot as Question 3. Her group collected and submitted 74,131 approved voter signatures in 2009, and another 14,023 signatures in 2010 to qualify the measure. The measure polled as high as 56%, but was unsuccessful.

== See also ==
- 2008 Massachusetts Question 1
- Tax revolt, political struggle to repeal, limit, or roll back a government-imposed tax
- Tax resistance
