= 2014 United States House of Representatives election in Alaska =

- November 4, 2014
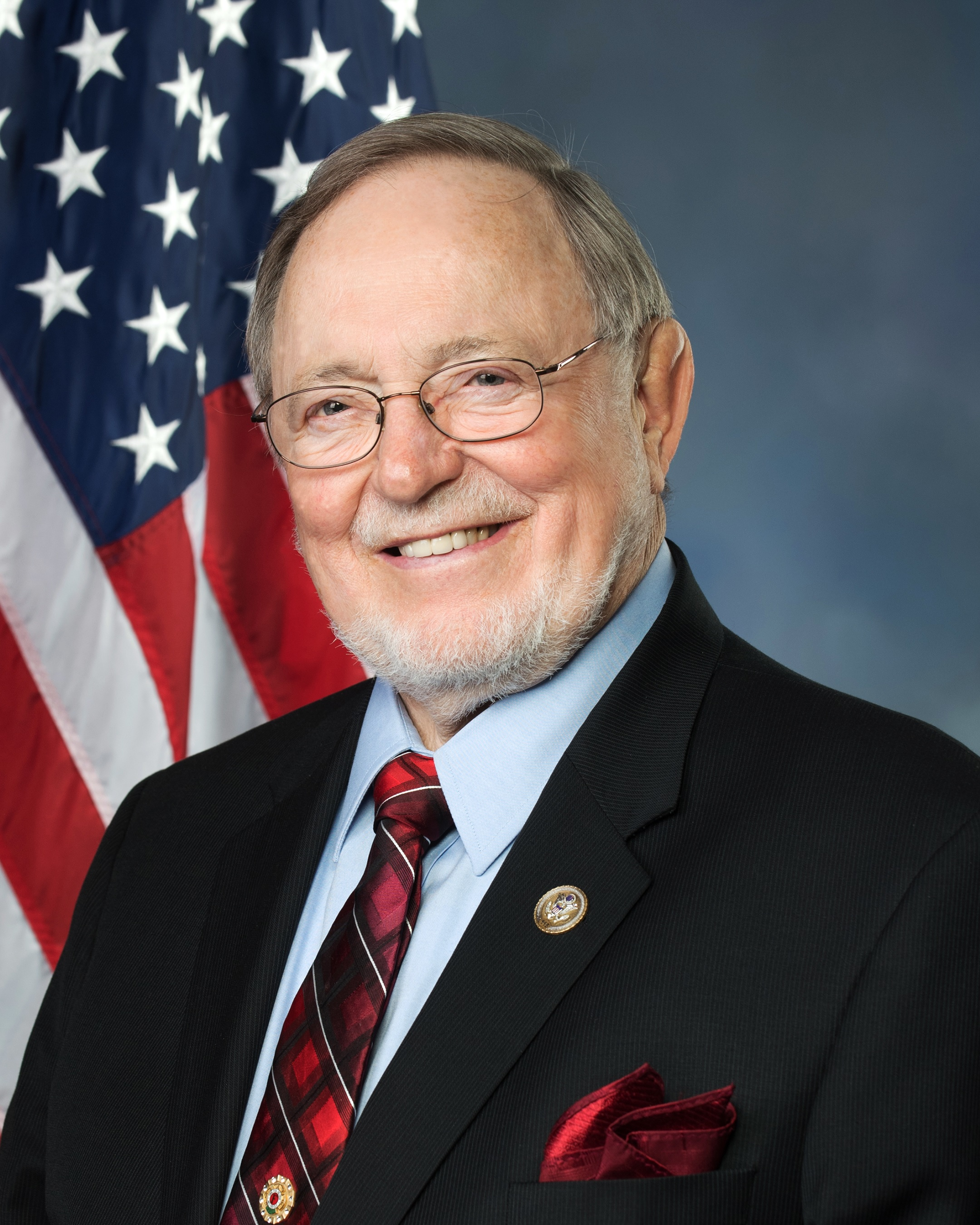

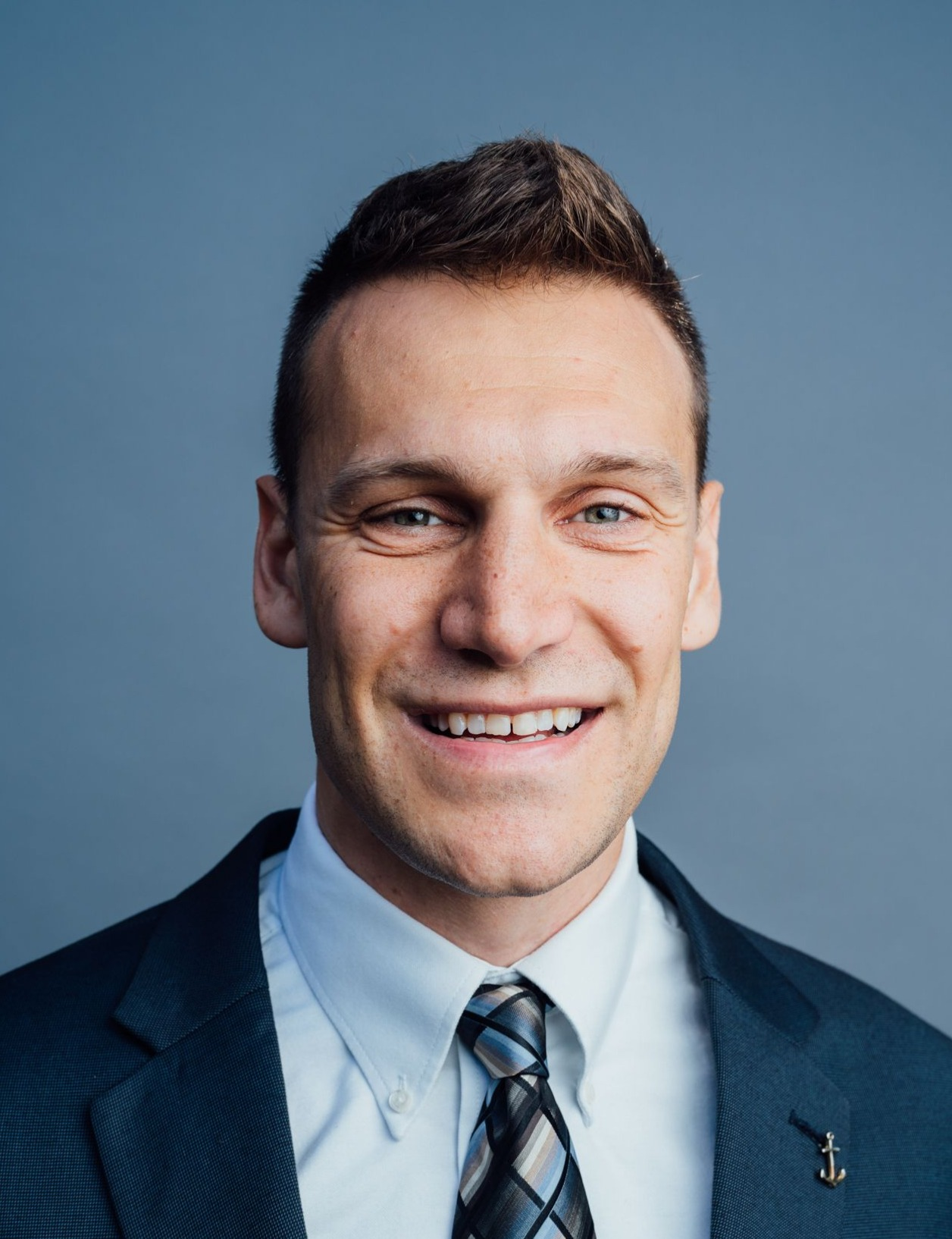

Nominee	Don Young	Forrest Dunbar	Jim McDermott
Party	Republican	Democratic	Libertarian
Popular vote	142,572	114,602	21,290
Percentage	50.97%	40.97%	7.61%
- Young: 40–50% 50–60% 60–70% 70–80% Dunbar: 40–50% 50–60% 60–70%
Representative at-large before election
Don Young
Republican
Elected Representative at-large
Don Young
Republican

The 2014 United States House of Representatives election in Alaska was held on November 4, 2014, to elect the U.S. representative from Alaska's at-large congressional district, who will represent the state of Alaska in the 114th United States Congress. The election coincided with the elections of a Class II U.S. Senator and the Governor of Alaska, as well as other elections to the United States Senate in other states and elections to the United States House of Representatives and various state and local elections.

Incumbent Republican U.S. Representative Don Young ran for re-election to a twenty-second term in office. He won the Republican primary and then defeated Democratic attorney Forrest Dunbar and Libertarian business professor Jim McDermott in the general election. Young was the only statewide official in Alaska who was re-elected in 2014, as Republican governor Sean Parnell and Democratic U.S. Senator Mark Begich were both defeated by their respective challengers.

== Republican primary ==
=== Candidates ===
==== Declared ====
- John Cox, retired naval officer and candidate for the seat in 2010 and 2012
- David Dohner, write-in candidate for the seat in 2012
- David Seaward, former mayor of Seward
- Don Young, incumbent U.S. Representative

=== Primary results ===
Republican primary results
Party	Candidate	Votes	%
Republican	Don Young	79,393	74.29
Republican	John Cox	14,497	13.57
Republican	David Seaward	7,604	7.12
Republican	David Dohner	5,373	5.03
Total votes		106,867	100.00

== Democratic–Libertarian–Independence primary ==
Candidates from the Alaska Democratic Party, Alaska Libertarian Party and Alaskan Independence Party appear on the same ballot, with the highest-placed candidate from each party receiving that party's nomination.

=== Democratic candidates ===
==== Declared ====
- Forrest Dunbar, attorney
- Frank Vondersaar, attorney, engineer and perennial candidate

==== Withdrew ====
- Matt Moore, businessman and candidate for the seat in 2012

==== Declined ====
- Scott McAdams, former mayor of Sitka and nominee for the U.S. Senate in 2010

=== Libertarian candidates ===
==== Declared ====
- Jim McDermott, business professor and nominee for the seat in 2012

=== Primary results ===
Democratic–Libertarian–Independence primary results
Party	Candidate	Votes	%
Democratic	Forrest Dunbar	38,735	63.19
Libertarian	Jim McDermott	13,437	21.92
Democratic	Frank Vondersaar	9,132	14.90
Total votes		61,304	100.00

== General election ==
=== Predictions ===
Source	Ranking	As of
The Cook Political Report	Safe R	November 3, 2014
Rothenberg	Safe R	October 24, 2014
Sabato's Crystal Ball	Likely R	October 30, 2014
RCP	Likely R	November 2, 2014
Daily Kos Elections	Likely R	November 4, 2014

=== Polling ===
Poll source	Date(s) administered	Sample size	Margin of error	Don Young (R)	Forrest Dunbar (D)	Jim McDermott (L)	Undecided
Public Policy Polling	November 1–2, 2014	1,052	± 3%	47%	41%	6%	6%
Moore Information	October 24–26, 2014	544	–	44%	43%	10%	4%
Hellenthal & Associates	October 15–21, 2014	403	± 4.88%	52%	35%	6%	7%
Public Policy Polling	September 18–21, 2014	880	± 3.3%	48%	33%	9%	11%

Hypothetical polling

Poll source	Date(s) administered	Sample size	Margin of error	Don Young (R)	Matt Moore (D)	Jim McDermott (L)	Undecided
Public Policy Polling	January 30–February 1, 2014	850	± 3.4%	50%	22%	12%	16%
Public Policy Polling	July 25–28, 2013	890	± 3.3%	56%	28%	—	16%

=== Results ===
2014 Alaska's at-large congressional district
Party	Candidate	Votes	%	±%
Republican	Don Young (incumbent)	142,572	50.97%	−12.97%
Democratic	Forrest Dunbar	114,602	40.97%	+12.36%
Libertarian	Jim McDermott	21,290	7.61%	+2.42%
Write-in		1,277	0.46%	+0.13%
Total votes		279,741	100.00%	N/A
Republican hold				
