= 2020 United States Senate election in Arkansas =

- November 3, 2020
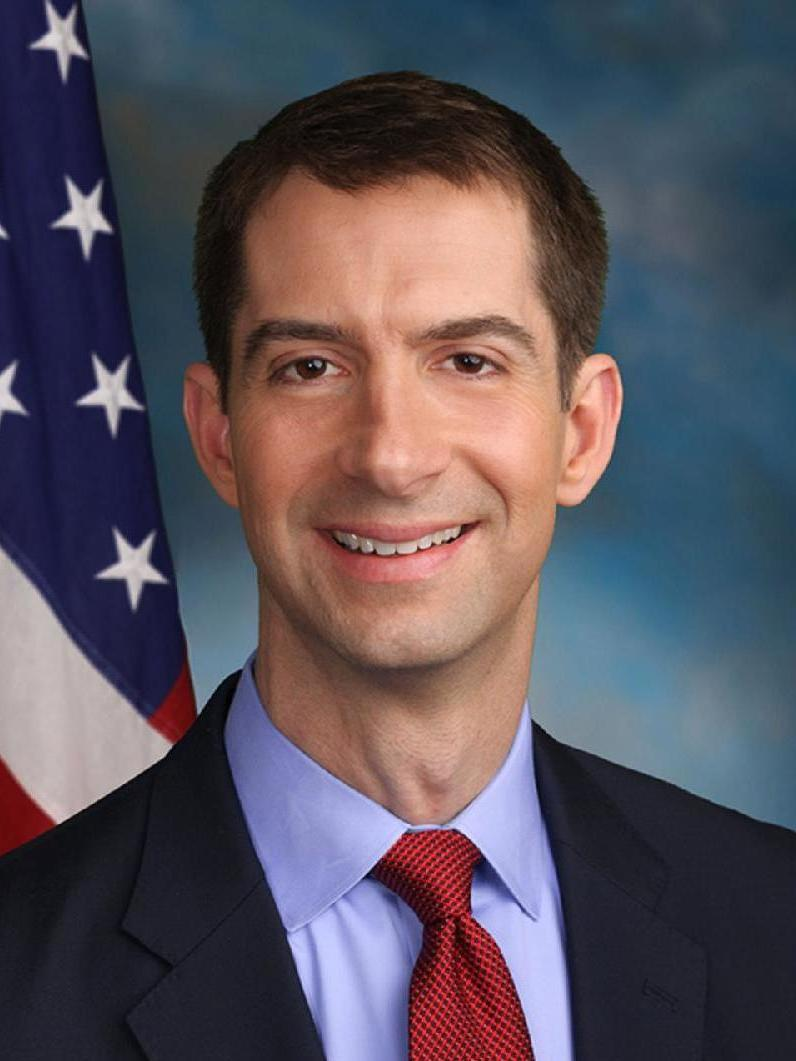

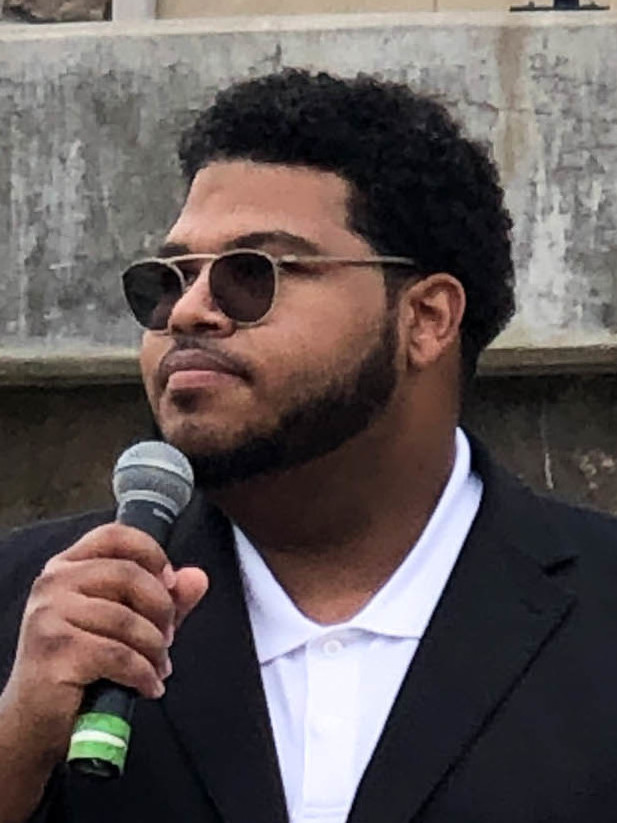
Nominee	Tom Cotton	Ricky Dale Harrington Jr.
Party	Republican	Libertarian
Popular vote	793,871	399,390
Percentage	66.53%	33.47%
- Cotton: 50–60% 60–70% 70–80% 80–90% >90% Harrington: 50–60% 60–70% 70–80% 80–90% >90% Tie: 50%
U.S. senator before election
Tom Cotton
Republican
Elected U.S. Senator
Tom Cotton
Republican

The 2020 United States Senate election in Arkansas was held on November 3, 2020, to elect a member of the United States Senate to represent the State of Arkansas, concurrently with the 2020 U.S. presidential election, other elections to the United States Senate, elections to the United States House of Representatives, and various state and local elections.

Incumbent Republican senator Tom Cotton won reelection to a second term, defeating Libertarian challenger Ricky Dale Harrington Jr. Though Cotton outperformed President Donald Trump in the concurrent presidential election by 4.1%, the election saw an undervote of 25,808 compared to the presidential election. Cotton won 10 counties he lost in 2014. Harrington's 33.5% finish was the best ever for a Libertarian candidate in a U.S. Senate election by vote percentage, surpassing Joe Miller's vote share in the 2016 Alaska race, and also by total number of votes, surpassing Michael Cloud's total in the 2002 Massachusetts race. It was also the highest vote percentage ever won by a Libertarian candidate in any U.S. statewide race, surpassing John Monds's vote share in the 2008 Georgia Public Service Commission race. Per exit polls, this largely appears to be due to many Democrats deciding to pick Harrington as there was no Democratic candidate on the ballot (82% of Democratic voters backed Harrington). Harrington won three counties, all of which were also won by Democratic presidential nominee Joe Biden.

== Republican nominee ==
In 2018, Tom Cotton, the incumbent U.S. senator, announced that he would run for re-election in 2020. Without any opposing candidates, there was not a contested primary, so Cotton automatically won the Republican nomination.

== Libertarian nominee ==
Ricky Dale Harrington Jr., Christian missionary and prison chaplain, announced that he would seek the Libertarian nomination. He subsequently became the Libertarian nominee.

== Withdrawn candidates ==
=== Democratic Party ===
Josh Mahony was the only candidate to file for the Democratic primary; however, he withdrew his candidacy due to a "family health concern" on November 12, 2019. Because Mahony dropped out after the filing deadline, the Democratic Party of Arkansas could only nominate a replacement if the candidate died, became seriously ill, left the state, or filed for another office. As a result, the Democratic Party of Arkansas was not able to fill the vacancy. A memo from the Cotton campaign to supporters detailed a strategy of sitting on opposition research regarding Mahony's employment history until after the filing deadline had passed.

==== Withdrawn ====
- Josh Mahony, nonprofit executive, former chair of the Fayetteville Airport Commission, and nominee for Arkansas's 3rd congressional district in 2018

==== Declined ====
- Wesley Clark, retired general, former Supreme Allied Commander of NATO, and 2004 Democratic presidential candidate

=== Independents ===
==== Withdrawn ====
- Dan Whitfield, progressive activist. On June 25, 2020, Whitfield's petition to run was denied for failing to gain enough signatures, an effort that was complicated by the COVID-19 pandemic. Whitfield filed an appeal with the United States Court of Appeals for the Eighth Circuit in an attempt to overturn this ruling. He officially suspended his campaign on October 1.

== General election ==
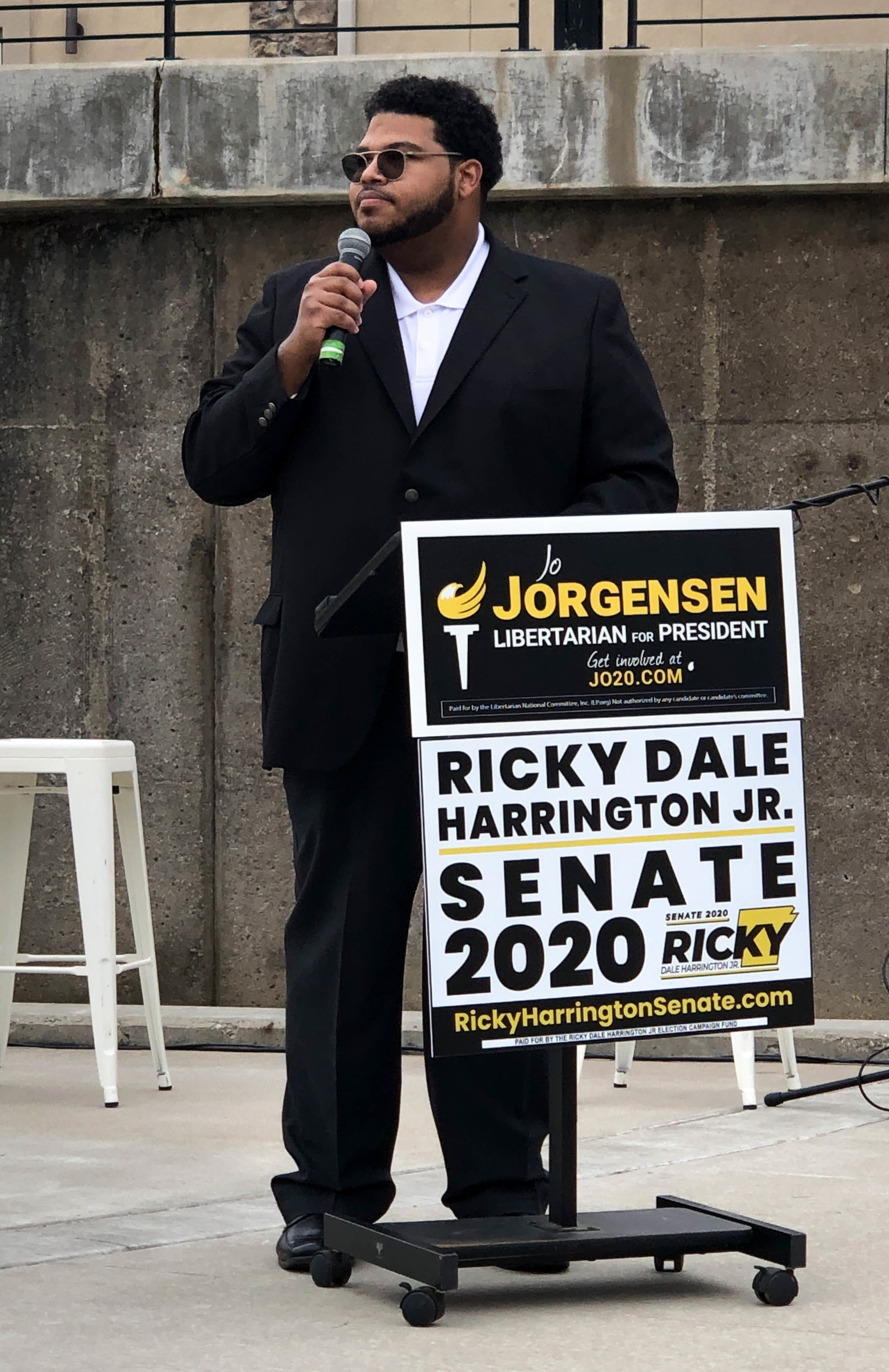
Harrington speaking at an event focused on criminal justice reform in Springdale, October 25, 2020

In public comments, Harrington spoke about excessive partisanship in the election process itself and in Senate operations, such as the contentious nomination of Amy Coney Barrett to the Supreme Court. Cotton declined to attend a debate hosted by Arkansas PBS, leaving Harrington as the sole participant. Harrington spent the debate responding to questions put to him by a panel of journalists.

=== Predictions ===
Source	Ranking	As of
The Cook Political Report	Solid R	October 29, 2020
Inside Elections	Safe R	October 28, 2020
Sabato's Crystal Ball	Safe R	November 2, 2020
Daily Kos	Safe R	October 30, 2020
Politico	Safe R	November 2, 2020
RCP	Safe R	October 23, 2020
DDHQ	Safe R	November 3, 2020
538	Safe R	November 2, 2020
Economist	Safe R	November 2, 2020

=== Endorsements ===
Ricky Dale Harrington Jr. (L)

U.S. federal officials

- Justin Amash, U.S. representative from Michigan's 3rd congressional district

Other individuals

- Spike Cohen, Libertarian Party's 2020 vice presidential nominee
- Jo Jorgensen, Libertarian Party's 2020 presidential nominee

=== Polling ===
==== Graphical summary ====
View source data.

=== Polls ===
Poll source	Date(s) administered	Sample size (Note: Key: A – all adults RV – registered voters LV – likely voters V – unclear)	Margin of error	Tom Cotton (R)	Ricky Dale Harrington Jr. (L)	Other	Undecided
University of Arkansas	October 9–21, 2020	591 (LV)	± 3.9%	75%	20%	5%	–
Hendrix College/Talk Business & Politics	October 11–13, 2020	647 (LV)	± 4.9%	63%	28%	–	10%
American Research Group (L) (Note: Poll sponsored by Harrington's campaign)	October 7–9, 2020	600 (LV)	± 4%	49%	38%	–	13%

=== Results ===
2020 United States Senate election in Arkansas
Party	Candidate	Votes	%
Republican	Tom Cotton (incumbent)	793,871	66.53%
Libertarian	Ricky Dale Harrington Jr.	399,390	33.47%
Total votes		1,193,261	100.00%
Republican hold			

==== By county ====
County	Tom Cotton Republican		Ricky Dale Harrington Jr. Libertarian		Margin		Total votes
County	#	%	#	%	#	%	Total votes
Arkansas	4,567	75.26	1,501	24.74	3,066	50.53	6,068
Ashley	5,801	74.85	1,949	25.15	3,852	49.70	7,750
Baxter	16,094	78.95	4,292	21.05	11,802	57.89	20,386
Benton	76,068	64.75	41,417	35.25	34,651	29.49	117,485
Boone	13,753	81.83	3,054	18.17	10,699	63.66	16,807
Bradley	2,485	69.74	1,078	30.26	1,407	39.49	3,563
Calhoun	1,714	80.02	428	19.98	1,286	60.04	2,142
Carroll	7,676	66.22	3,916	33.78	3,760	32.44	11,592
Chicot	1,945	53.23	1,709	46.77	236	6.46	3,654
Clark	5,089	63.08	2,978	36.92	2,111	26.17	8,067
Clay	4,196	82.29	903	17.71	3,293	64.58	5,099
Cleburne	10,602	84.36	1,966	15.64	8,636	68.71	12,568
Cleveland	2,987	83.98	570	16.02	2,417	67.95	3,557
Columbia	5,776	71.39	2,315	28.61	3,461	42.78	8,091
Conway	5,936	69.49	2,606	30.51	3,330	38.98	8,542
Craighead	26,342	69.45	11,588	30.55	14,754	38.90	37,930
Crawford	18,825	78.30	5,216	21.70	13,609	56.61	24,041
Crittenden	7,969	52.74	7,141	47.26	828	5.48	15,110
Cross	5,085	75.21	1,676	24.79	3,409	50.42	6,761
Dallas	1,730	68.11	810	31.89	920	36.22	2,540
Desha	2,299	57.43	1,704	42.57	595	14.86	4,003
Drew	4,567	68.05	2,144	31.95	2,423	36.10	6,711
Faulkner	35,278	65.98	18,192	34.02	17,086	31.95	53,470
Franklin	5,645	79.97	1,414	20.03	4,231	59.94	7,059
Fulton	4,030	80.89	952	19.11	3,078	61.78	4,982
Garland	30,420	69.52	13,336	30.48	17,084	39.04	43,756
Grant	6,883	84.34	1,278	15.66	5,605	68.68	8,161
Greene	12,820	81.03	3,002	18.97	9,818	62.05	15,822
Hempstead	4,742	71.63	1,878	28.37	2,864	43.26	6,620
Hot Spring	9,388	75.83	2,993	24.17	6,395	51.65	12,381
Howard	3,549	75.57	1,147	24.43	2,402	51.15	4,696
Independence	11,530	80.92	2,719	19.08	8,811	61.84	14,249
Izard	4,724	82.91	974	17.09	3,750	65.81	5,698
Jackson	3,732	75.95	1,182	24.05	2,550	51.89	4,914
Jefferson	11,295	46.84	12,821	53.16	-1,526	-6.33	24,116
Johnson	7,044	75.01	2,347	24.99	4,697	50.02	9,391
Lafayette	1,836	72.17	708	27.83	1,128	44.34	2,544
Lawrence	4,768	82.62	1,003	17.38	3,765	65.24	5,771
Lee	1,410	55.40	1,135	44.60	275	10.81	2,545
Lincoln	2,907	76.50	893	23.50	2,014	53.00	3,800
Little River	3,885	77.36	1,137	22.64	2,748	54.72	5,022
Logan	6,524	79.78	1,654	20.22	4,870	59.55	8,178
Lonoke	23,504	77.34	6,887	22.66	16,617	54.68	30,391
Madison	5,627	78.06	1,582	21.94	4,045	56.11	7,209
Marion	5,928	80.43	1,442	19.57	4,486	60.87	7,370
Miller	12,251	76.43	3,778	23.57	8,473	52.86	16,029
Mississippi	7,792	66.66	3,898	33.34	3,894	33.31	11,690
Monroe	1,717	63.06	1,006	36.94	711	26.11	2,723
Montgomery	3,116	81.59	703	18.41	2,413	63.18	3,819
Nevada	2,292	71.07	933	28.93	1,359	42.14	3,225
Newton	3,155	81.25	728	18.75	2,427	62.50	3,883
Ouachita	5,787	62.12	3,529	37.88	2,258	24.24	9,316
Perry	3,553	77.80	1,014	22.20	2,539	55.59	4,567
Phillips	2,785	49.16	2,880	50.84	-95	-1.68	5,665
Pike	3,594	85.47	611	14.53	2,983	70.94	4,205
Poinsett	6,092	82.15	1,324	17.85	4,768	64.29	7,416
Polk	7,083	84.25	1,324	15.75	5,759	68.50	8,407
Pope	18,411	76.24	5,739	23.76	12,672	52.47	24,150
Prairie	2,849	84.09	539	15.91	2,310	68.18	3,388
Pulaski	71,966	43.42	93,784	56.58	-21,818	-13.16	165,750
Randolph	5,487	82.07	1,199	17.93	4,288	64.13	6,686
Saline	41,443	73.33	15,073	26.67	26,370	46.66	56,516
Scott	3,017	85.59	508	14.41	2,509	71.18	3,525
Searcy	3,337	84.80	598	15.20	2,739	69.61	3,935
Sebastian	31,997	68.37	14,804	31.63	17,193	36.74	46,801
Sevier	4,105	80.35	1,004	19.65	3,101	60.70	5,109
Sharp	6,092	82.19	1,320	17.81	4,772	64.38	7,412
St. Francis	3,606	55.66	2,873	44.34	733	11.31	6,479
Stone	4,637	79.32	1,209	20.68	3,428	58.64	5,846
Union	11,292	70.46	4,733	29.54	6,559	40.93	16,025
Van Buren	6,135	80.15	1,519	19.85	4,616	60.31	7,654
Washington	49,361	53.33	43,205	46.67	6,156	6.65	92,566
White	24,887	80.91	5,872	19.09	19,015	61.82	30,759
Woodruff	1,694	70.03	725	29.97	969	40.06	2,419
Yell	5,363	80.24	1,321	19.76	4,042	60.47	6,684
Totals	793,871	66.53	399,390	33.47	394,481	33.06	1,193,261

== Notes ==
Partisan clients

== See also ==
- 2020 Arkansas elections
