= 2000 United States Senate election in Massachusetts =

- November 7, 2000
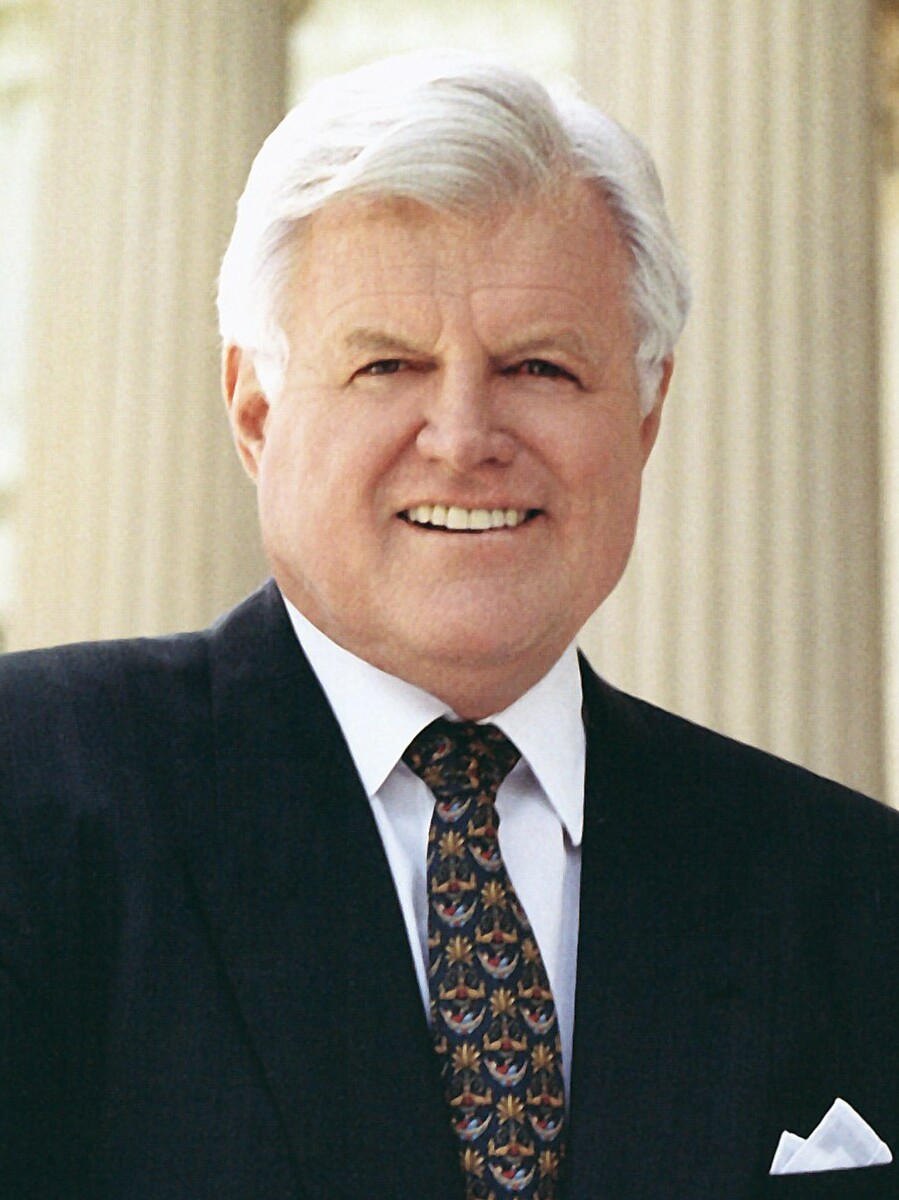

Nominee	Ted Kennedy	Jack Robinson III	Carla Howell
Party	Democratic	Republican	Libertarian
Popular vote	1,889,494	334,341	308,860
Percentage	72.69%	12.86%	11.88%
- Kennedy: 40–50% 50–60% 60–70% 70–80% 80–90%
U.S. senator before election
Ted Kennedy
Democratic
Elected U.S. Senator
Ted Kennedy
Democratic

The 2000 United States Senate election in Massachusetts was held on November 7, 2000. Democratic incumbent Ted Kennedy was re-elected to an eighth term in office over Jack Robinson III and Carla Howell. For only the second (and final) time in his career, Kennedy polled more than 70 percent of the vote.

The election was notable for a strong third-party performance from Howell on the Libertarian Party ticket, less than one percentage point behind Robinson, the Republican nominee. This divided opposition resulted in Kennedy's largest-ever margin of victory, although he had recorded a higher percentage of the popular vote in 1964. He also won every municipality in the state for the only time in his career.

== General election ==
=== Candidates ===
- Dale E. Friedgen (Independent)
- Carla Howell, political activist and small government advocate (Libertarian)
- Philip Hyde III (Timesizing Not Downsizing)
- Ted Kennedy, incumbent U.S. Senator since 1962 (Democratic)
- Philip F. Lawler (Constitution)
- Jack E. Robinson III, perennial candidate (Republican)

=== Polling ===
Poll source	Date(s)	Sample size	Margin of error	Ted Kennedy (D)	Jack Robinson (R)	Other / undecided (Note: Calculated by taking the difference of 100% and all other candidates combined.)
Harris Insights & Analytics	November 3, 2000	5,109	—	67%	14%	19%
University of Massachusetts Amherst	October 27, 2000	401 (RV)	—	64%	11%	25%
KRC Research	October 25, 2000	400	—	68%	16%	16%
RKM Research and Communications Inc.	October 25, 2000	400	—	60%	11%	29%

=== Results ===
General election results
Party	Candidate	Votes	%	±%
Democratic	Ted Kennedy (incumbent)	1,889,494	72.69%	▲14.62
Republican	Jack E. Robinson III	334,341	12.86%	▼28.15
Libertarian	Carla Howell	308,860	11.88%	▲11.22
Constitution	Philip F. Lawler	42,113	1.62%	N/A
Independent	Dale E. Friedgen	13,687	0.53%	N/A
Independent	Philip Hyde III	8,452	0.33%	N/A
Write-in		2,473	0.10%	+0.07%
Total votes		2,599,420	100%	N/A
Democratic hold				

==== By county ====
County	Ted Kennedy Democratic		Jack Robinson Republican		All Others	
County	#	%	#	%	#	%
Barnstable	79,222	67.7%	19,460	16.6%	18,335	15.6%
Berkshire	45,259	79.0%	7,859	13.7%	4,195	7.4%
Bristol	153,422	75.1%	28,053	13.7%	22,901	11.2%
Dukes	6,641	77.5%	991	11.6%	939	11.0%
Essex	213,609	71.5%	41,174	13.8%	44,053	14.7%
Franklin	22,505	69.1%	4,865	14.9%	5,220	16.1%
Hampden	116,894	70.8%	30,523	18.5%	17,695	10.7%
Hampshire	47,896	72.7%	9,695	14.7%	8,313	12.7%
Middlesex	470,257	74.3%	68,517	10.8%	94,080	14.9%
Nantucket	3,441	72.3%	841	17.7%	479	10.0%
Norfolk	221,390	72.5%	36,374	11.9%	47,498	15.5%
Plymouth	139,443	68.1%	29,443	14.4%	35,728	17.5%
Suffolk	162,406	80.3%	18,684	9.2%	21,176	10.5%
Worcester	207,109	69.0%	37,862	12.6%	54,973	18.3%
Totals	1,889,494	72.7%	334,341	12.9%	375,585	14.4%

== See also ==
- 2000 United States Senate elections
