= 1978 United States House of Representatives election in Nevada =

1978 United States House election in Nevada
- November 7, 1978
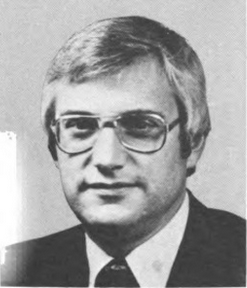

Nominee	Jim Santini	Bill O'Mara
Party	Democratic	Republican
Popular vote	132,513	44,425
Percentage	69.51%	23.30%
- County results Santini: 50–60% 60–70% 70–80% 80–90%
Representative
At-large before election
James David Santini
Democratic
Elected Representative
At-large
James David Santini
Democratic

The 1978 United States House of Representatives election in Nevada was held on Tuesday November 7, 1978, to elect the state's at-large representative. Primary elections were held on September 12, 1978.

Incumbent representative, James David Santini easily won re-election to a third term. He won every county except for Douglas County with over 60 percent of the vote.

== Democratic primary ==
- James David Santini, Incumbent Representative since 1975.
- Cal Weston

=== Results ===
Democratic primary results
Party	Candidate	Votes	%
Democratic	James David Santini	67,338	80.22
Democratic	Cal Weston	9,493	11.31
Democratic	None of These Candidates	7,106	8.47
Total votes		83,937	100.00

== Republican primary ==
- Bill O'Mara
- Martin Hoffenblum
- Sam M. Cavnar

=== Results ===
Republican primary results
Party	Candidate	Votes	%
Republican	None of These Candidates	15,441	33.47
Republican	Bill O'Mara	14,610	31.67
Republican	Sam M. Cavnar	13,102	28.40
Republican	Martin Hoffenblum	2,982	6.46
Total votes		46,135	100.00

== General Election ==
=== Candidates ===
- James David Santini, Incumbent Representative
- Linda West, Libertarian candidate
- Bill O'Mara, Republican candidate

General election results
Party	Candidate	Votes	%
Democratic	James David Santini	132,513	69.51%
Republican	Bill O'Mara	44,425	23.30%
Independent	None of These Candidates	7,676	4.03%
Libertarian	Linda West	6,029	3.16%
Total votes		190,643	100.00%
Democratic hold			
