= Harry Browne 2000 presidential campaign =

American political campaign

Harry Browne for President
- Campaign: 2000 United States presidential election (Libertarian convention ballot)
- Candidate: Harry Browne; Author and Libertarian presidential nominee in 1996; Art Olivier; Mayor of Bellflower, California (1998–1999)
- Affiliation: Libertarian Party
- Status: Announced: February 14, 2000; Official nominee: July 3, 2000; Lost election: November 7, 2000
- Headquarters: Arlington, Virginia
- Receipts: US$2,531,437

Website
- Website (archived October 2000)

The 2000 presidential campaign of Harry Browne, investment banker and 1996 nominee of the Libertarian Party, was formally launched on February 14, 2000, as Browne announced his intention to seek the Libertarian Party nomination for the presidency of the United States in the 2000 presidential election. Browne gained the Libertarian nomination on the first convention ballot becoming the first person to win the party's nomination twice and Art Olivier, former mayor of Bellflower, California, was nominated as his vice president.

The ticket had ballot status in all 50 states and in the District of Columbia. Due to a dispute with the Arizona wing of the Party, L. Neil Smith was placed on the ballot instead of Browne. Admitting that he had little chance of winning, he stated that any vote for him instead of George W. Bush or Al Gore was an "endorsement, a statement, a declaration on behalf of smaller government."

== Nomination ==
On July 2, at the party's National Convention in Anaheim, California, Browne received the nomination of the Libertarian Party, receiving 493 votes out of a possible 878 on the first ballot. In his acceptance speech, Browne emphasized his opposition to the two-party system and the war on drugs, and his support for the US Constitution.

== Campaign ==
=== Platform ===
Browne endorsed letting people having the option to opt out of social security, along with selling off unneeded and unconstitutional federal assets to provide lifetime retirement accounts. He also advocated the repealing of gun laws, the end to the war on drugs and federal welfare, the complete departure of federal government involvement in healthcare and education, with a complete repeal of the income tax. He advised for a foreign policy in the vein of Washington and Jefferson, that "wishes good will toward people everywhere and is a threat to no other country.", with a preference for a stronger defense instead of strengthening the national offense. He advocated for the Internet to be kept free of taxation and censorship.

=== Appearances ===
From October to Election Day, he made 15 national TV appearances, 18 national radio appearances, 19 local TV appearances, 98 local radio appearances, 40 press interviews, 14 Internet interviews or articles, and 20 speeches, with five articles written and published.

=== Objectives ===
The campaign had two main goals, related more to the party than the election.

- Surpass a million votes for the first time.
- Outpoll Pat Buchanan and the Reform Party.

However, they failed in achieving either goal.

== Results ==
Browne received 384,431 votes (0.4%), finishing in 5th place. He received 101,328 fewer votes than he did in his campaign four years prior, while finishing 64,464 votes behind Pat Buchanan and 2,498,524 behind Ralph Nader for third.
