= 2012 United States House of Representatives election in Alaska =

- November 6, 2012
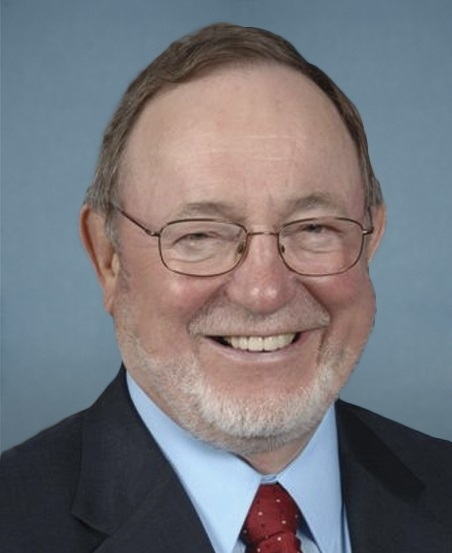

Nominee	Don Young	Sharon Cissna	Jim McDermott
Party	Republican	Democratic	Libertarian
Popular vote	185,296	82,927	15,028
Percentage	63.93%	28.61%	5.18%
- Results by state house district Young: 50–60% 60–70% 70–80% Cissna: 40–50%
Representative At-large before election
Don Young
Republican
Elected Representative At-large
Don Young
Republican

The 2012 United States House of Representatives election in Alaska was held on Tuesday, November 6, 2012, to elect the U.S. representative from Alaska's at-large congressional district, who will represent the state of Alaska in the 113th United States Congress. The election coincided with the elections of other federal and state offices, including a quadrennial presidential election. As is the case every twelve years in Alaska, this was the only statewide election contest in the state held in 2012. A primary election was held on August 28, 2012.

== Primary elections ==
=== Republican ===
==== Candidates ====
===== Advanced to general =====
- Don Young, incumbent U.S. Representative

===== Eliminated in primary =====
- John R. Cox, retired Navy officer and candidate for this seat in 2010
- Terre Gales, asset manager, former defense contractor, and Air Force veteran

==== Primary results ====
Republican primary results
Party	Candidate	Votes	%
Republican	Don Young (incumbent)	58,789	78.6
Republican	John Cox	11,179	14.9
Republican	Terre Gales	4,841	6.5
Total votes		74,809	100

=== ADL (Alaskan Independence–Democratic–Libertarian) ===
==== Democratic Candidates ====
===== Advanced to general =====
- Sharon Cissna, state representative

===== Eliminated in primary =====
- Debra Chesnut, nurse and businesswoman
- Matt Moore, businessman and former candidate for the Alaska Legislature
- Doug Urquidi, Electrician candidate for Anchorage Assembly in 2011
- Frank J. Vondersaar, lawyer, engineer, perennial candidate and nominee for Senate in 2002

==== Libertarian Candidates ====
===== Advanced to general =====
- Jim C. McDermott, business professor

=== Primary results ===
ADL combined primary results
Party	Candidate	Votes	%
Democratic	Sharon Cissna	16,329	42.8
Democratic	Matt Moore	7,374	19.3
Libertarian	Jim McDermott	5,741	15.0
Democratic	Debra Chesnut	5,626	14.7
Democratic	Frank Vondersaar	2,085	5.5
Democratic	Doug Urquidi	1,034	2.7
Total votes		38,189	100

== Independents ==
- Ted Gianoutsos of Anchorage. Perennial candidate who filed by nominating petition to run as an independent (referred to as "Non-Affiliated" by the Alaska Division of Elections).
- Clinton Desjarlais of Anchorage. Non-affiliated write-in candidate
- Fletcher Fuller Jr. of Anchorage. Non-affiliated write-in candidate
- Sidney Hill of Palmer. Non-affiliated write-in candidate

== General election ==
=== Endorsements ===
Don Young (R)

Organizations

- NRA Political Victory Fund
- National Right to Life Committee
- United States Chamber of Commerce

=== Predictions ===
Source	Ranking	As of
The Cook Political Report	Safe R	November 5, 2012
Rothenberg	Safe R	November 2, 2012
Roll Call	Safe R	November 4, 2012
Sabato's Crystal Ball	Safe R	November 5, 2012
NY Times	Safe R	November 4, 2012
RCP	Safe R	November 4, 2012
The Hill	Safe R	November 4, 2012

=== Results ===
2012 Alaska's at-large congressional district election
Party	Candidate	Votes	%	±%
Republican	Don Young (incumbent)	185,296	63.93	−5.0
Democratic	Sharon Cissna	82,927	28.61	−1.9
Libertarian	Jim McDermott	15,028	5.18	N/A
Independent	Ted Gianoutsos	5,589	1.92	N/A
Write-in		964	0.33	−0.2
Majority		102,369	35.32	−3.1
Total votes		289,804	100.0	
Republican hold				
