= 2002 United States Senate election in Massachusetts =

- November 5, 2002
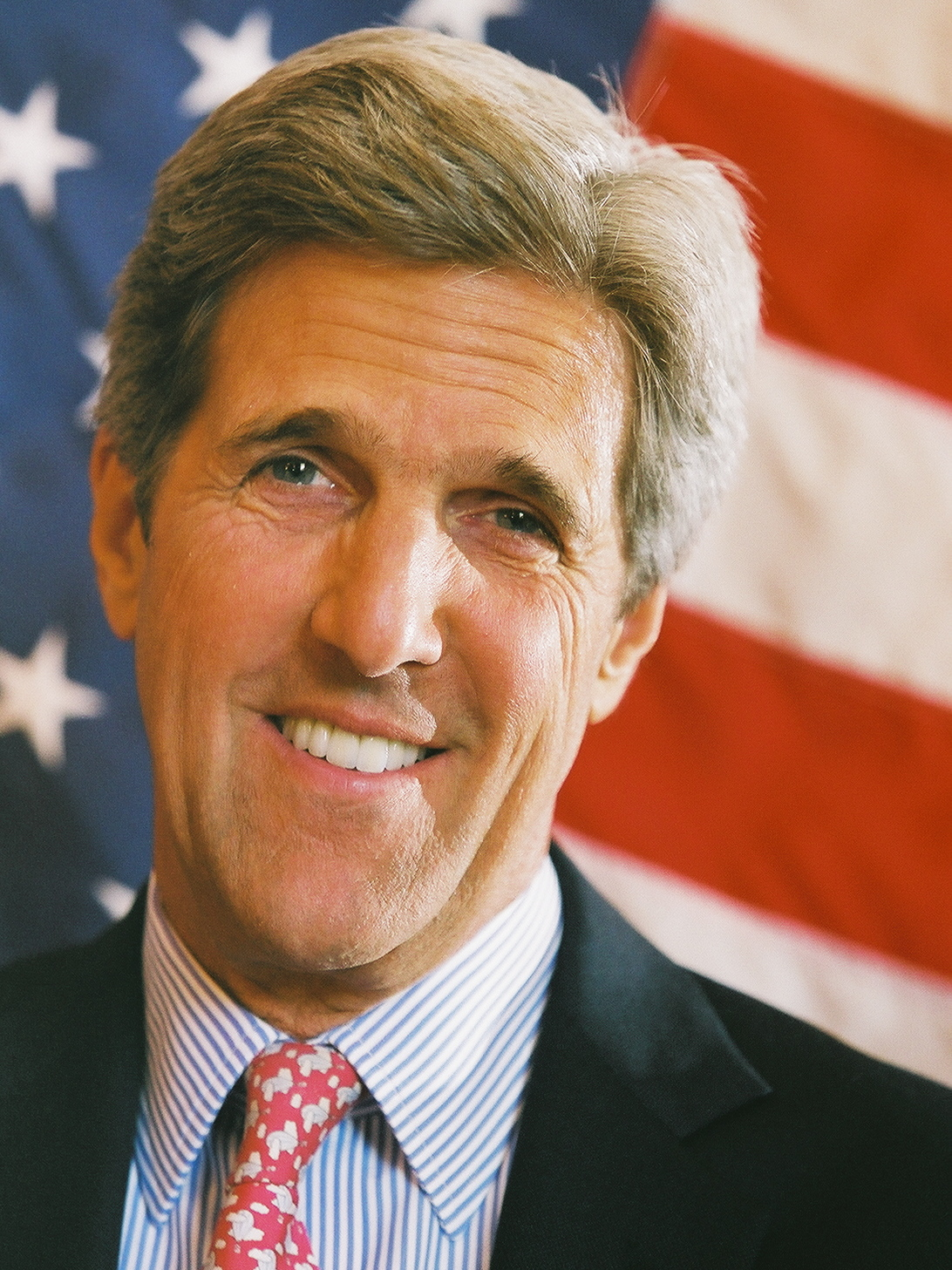

Nominee	John Kerry	Michael Cloud
Party	Democratic	Libertarian
Popular vote	1,605,976	369,807
Percentage	80.03%	18.43%
- Kerry: 50–60% 60–70% 70–80% 80–90% >90%
U.S. senator before election
John Kerry
Democratic
Elected U.S. Senator
John Kerry
Democratic

The 2002 United States Senate election in Massachusetts took place on November 5, 2002. Incumbent Democratic U.S. Senator John Kerry won re-election to a fourth term against Libertarian Michael Cloud, with no Republican filing to run. Kerry won every county, congressional district, municipality, and precinct in the state.

The lack of a Republican Party candidate caused Cloud to receive the largest percentage of votes for a U.S. Senate candidate in the Libertarian Party's history at that time, though this record has since been eclipsed by Joe Miller in Alaska in 2016 and Ricky Dale Harrington Jr. in Arkansas in 2020. Cloud also won the largest number of raw votes for a Libertarian candidate at the time, since eclipsed by Harrington.

Kerry's support for the invasion of Iraq also prompted a late write-in challenge by anti-war candidate Randall Forsberg.

== Democratic primary ==
Democratic primary results
Party	Candidate	Votes	%
Democratic	John F. Kerry (incumbent)	615,517	99.35%
Write-in		3,979	0.65%
Total votes		619,496	100.00%

== General election ==
=== Candidates ===
- Michael Cloud (Libertarian)
- Randall Forsberg, anti-war activist (Independent, write-in)
- John Kerry, incumbent U.S. senator since 1985 (Democratic)

=== Predictions ===
Source	Ranking	As of
Sabato's Crystal Ball	Safe D	November 4, 2002

=== Results ===
County Flips: Democratic Hold Flip

2002 U.S. Senate election in Massachusetts
Party	Candidate	Votes	%	±%
Democratic	John Kerry (incumbent)	1,605,976	80.03%	▲27.29
Libertarian	Michael Cloud	369,807	18.43%	N/A
Independent	Randall Forsberg (write-in)	24,898	1.24%	N/A
Write-in		6,077	0.30%	▲0.24
Total votes		2,006,758	100.00%	

==== By county ====
County	John Kerry Democratic		Michael Cloud Libertarian		All others	
County	#	%	#	%	#	%
Barnstable	70,393	76.5%	20,696	22.5%	972	1.1%
Berkshire	34,521	85.6%	5,424	13.4%	398	1.0%
Bristol	122,104	83.0%	24,489	16.6%	504	0.3%
Dukes	5,487	84.3%	864	13.3%	161	2.5%
Essex	186,309	79.6%	45,956	19.6%	1,916	0.8%
Franklin	18,654	76.6%	3,757	15.4%	1,950	8.0%
Hampden	100,616	81.7%	21,696	17.6%	778	0.7%
Hampshire	39,448	78.1%	7,398	14.6%	3,694	7.3%
Middlesex	395,087	79.0%	91,951	18.4%	13,103	2.6%
Nantucket	3,008	82.6%	604	16.6%	29	0.8%
Norfolk	192,342	79.9%	45,235	18.8%	3,080	1.3%
Plymouth	123,597	77.7%	34,623	21.8%	812	0.5%
Suffolk	129,026	84.9%	20,634	13.6%	2,238	1.5%
Worcester	185,384	79.5%	46,480	19.9%	1,340	0.6%
Totals	1,605,976	80.0%	369,807	18.4%	30,975	1.5%

Counties that flipped from Republican to Democratic

- Barnstable (largest municipality: Barnstable)
- Essex (largest municipality: Lynn)
- Hampden (largest municipality: Springfield)
- Plymouth (largest municipality: Brockton)
- Worcester (largest municipality: Worcester)

== See also ==
- 2002 United States Senate elections
