= Libertarian Party =

Libertarian Party may refer to:

- Libertarian Party (Argentina)
- Liberal Libertarian Party
- Libertarian Party of Australia
- Libertarian Party of Canada
  - British Columbia Libertarian Party
  - Libertarian Party of Manitoba (now Freedom Party of Manitoba)
  - Ontario Libertarian Party
- Libertarian Party (Netherlands)
- Libertarian Party of Russia
- Libertarian Party (UK)
- Scottish Libertarian Party
- Libertarian Party (United States)
  - Libertarian Party of Alabama
  - Alaska Libertarian Party
  - Arizona Libertarian Party
  - Libertarian Party of Arkansas
  - Libertarian Party of California
  - Libertarian Party of Colorado
  - Libertarian Party of Connecticut
  - Libertarian Party of Delaware
  - Libertarian Party of the District of Columbia
  - Libertarian Party of Florida
  - Libertarian Party of Georgia
  - Libertarian Party of Hawaii
  - Libertarian Party of Idaho
  - Libertarian Party of Illinois
  - Libertarian Party of Indiana
  - Libertarian Party of Iowa
  - Libertarian Party of Kansas
  - Libertarian Party of Kentucky
  - Libertarian Party of Louisiana
  - Libertarian Party of Maine
  - Libertarian Party of Maryland
  - Libertarian Association of Massachusetts
  - Libertarian Party of Michigan
  - Libertarian Party of Minnesota
  - Libertarian Party of Mississippi
  - Libertarian Party of Missouri
  - Montana Libertarian Party
  - Libertarian Party of Nebraska
  - Libertarian Party of Nevada
  - Libertarian Party of New Hampshire
  - New Jersey Libertarian Party
  - Libertarian Party of New Mexico
  - Libertarian Party of New York
  - Libertarian Party of North Carolina
  - Libertarian Party of North Dakota
  - Libertarian Party of Ohio
  - Libertarian Party of Oklahoma
  - Libertarian Party of Oregon
  - Libertarian Party of Pennsylvania
  - Libertarian Party of Puerto Rico
  - Libertarian Party of Rhode Island
  - Libertarian Party of South Carolina
  - Libertarian Party of South Dakota
  - Libertarian Party of Tennessee
  - Libertarian Party of Texas
  - Libertarian Party of Utah
  - Libertarian Party of Vermont
  - Libertarian Party of Virginia
  - Libertarian Party of Washington
  - Libertarian Party of West Virginia
  - Libertarian Party of Wisconsin
  - Libertarian Party of Wyoming

== See also ==
- Libertarianism (disambiguation)
- List of libertarian political parties, for parties espousing some or all principles of libertarianism, but not necessarily using the word libertarian in their names
