= List of Jo Jorgensen 2020 presidential campaign endorsements =

Jo Jorgensen for President
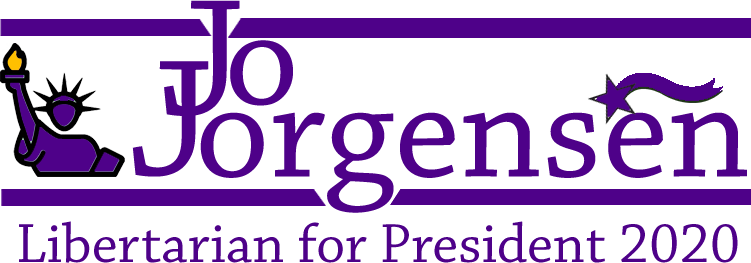
- Campaign: 2020 Libertarian primaries 2020 U.S. presidential election
- Candidate: Jo Jorgensen; Senior lecturer at Clemson University; Spike Cohen; Podcaster and businessman
- Affiliation: Libertarian Party
- Status: Announced: November 2, 2019; Official nominee: May 23, 2020; Lost election: November 3, 2020
- Headquarters: Greenville, South Carolina
- Key people: Steve Dasbach (campaign manager)
- Receipts: US$3,405,357 (November 23, 2020)
- Slogan(s): Real Change for Real People; She's With Us! Let Her Speak; I'm With Her; Break Free From Big Government

Website
- www.jo20.com

This is a list of notable individuals and organizations who voiced their endorsement of Jo Jorgensen's campaign in the 2020 U.S. presidential election.

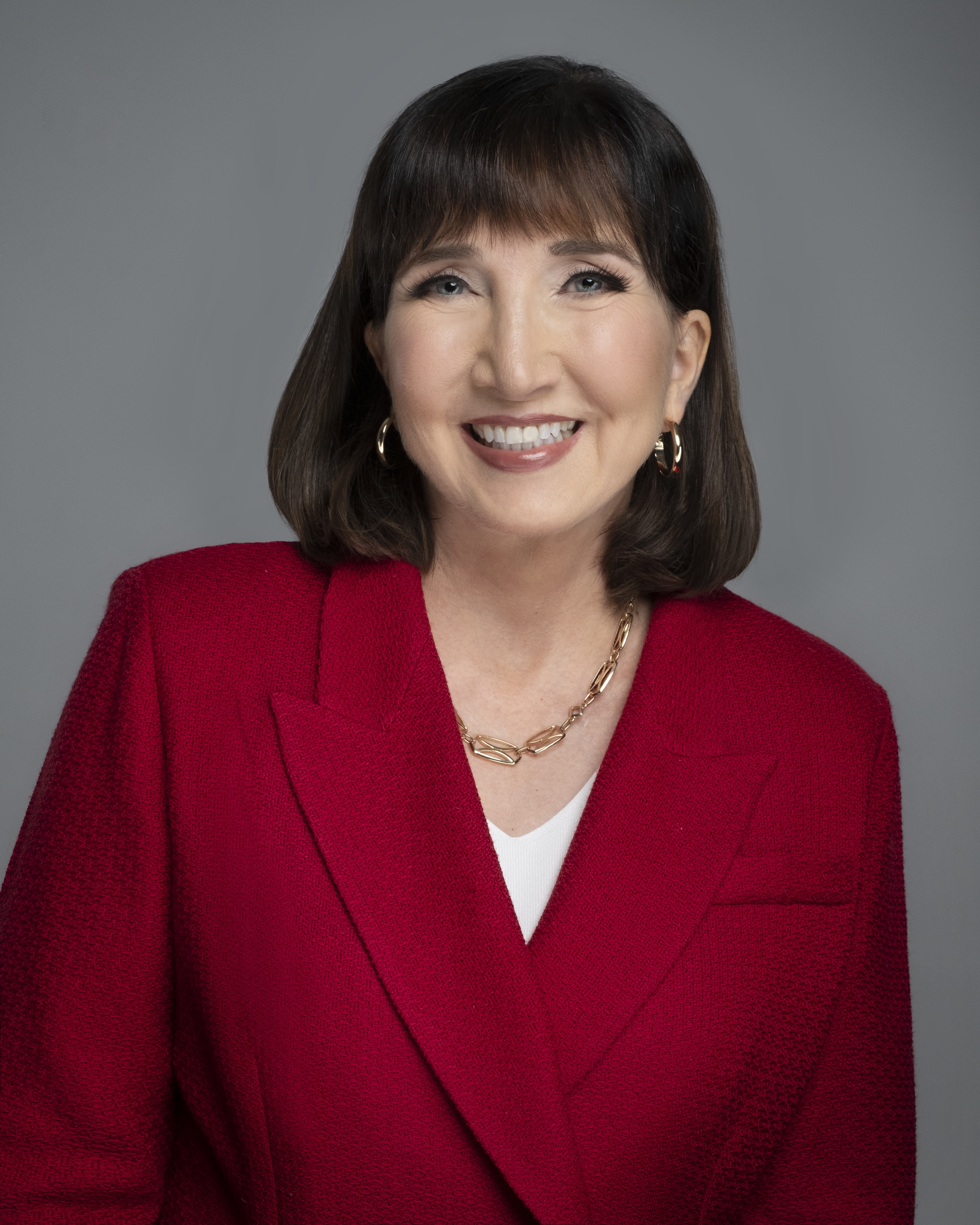
Jo Jorgensen

== Members of Congress ==
- Justin Amash, U.S. representative from Michigan (2011–2021)

== Municipal and local officials ==
- James P. Gray, former presiding judge of the Superior Court of Orange County, California, 2012 vice-presidential nominee of the Libertarian Party, and candidate for the 2020 Libertarian nomination for president

== International political figures ==
- Alex Vanopslagh, leader of the Danish Liberal Alliance (2019–present), Member of the Folketing (2019–present) (Liberal Alliance)

== Business executives and leaders ==
- Peter Schiff, stockbroker, financial commentator, radio personality

== Activists and public figures ==
- Ken Bone, political activist (previously endorsed Andrew Yang)
- Jacob Hornberger, founder and president of the Future of Freedom Foundation, candidate for president in 2000 and 2020
- Gary Nolan, radio host, candidate for the Libertarian presidential nomination in 2004

== Commentators, writers, and columnists ==
- Peter Bagge, cartoonist
- Nick Gillespie, editor-at-large of Reason
- Jack Hunter, radio host, political commentator, Politics Editor for Rare.us
- Jeff Jacoby, Boston Globe columnist
- John Stossel, journalist, Libertarian pundit
- Jacob Sullum, columnist and senior editor of Reason
- Jesse Walker, books editor of Reason
- Matt Welch, editor-at-large and former editor-in-chief of Reason

== Political parties ==
- Alaska Libertarian Party
- Libertarian Party of Alabama
- Libertarian Party of Arkansas
- Libertarian Party of Connecticut
- Libertarian Party of Delaware
- Libertarian Party of Hawaii
- Libertarian Party of Kansas
- Libertarian Party of Kentucky
- Libertarian Party of Louisiana
- Libertarian Party of Maine
- Libertarian Party of Maryland
- Libertarian Party of Massachusetts
- Libertarian Party of Mississippi
- Libertarian Party of Missouri
- Libertarian Party of Montana
- Libertarian Party of New Hampshire
- Libertarian Party of New Mexico
- Libertarian Party of New York
- Libertarian Party of North Carolina
- Libertarian Party of North Dakota
- Libertarian Party of Ohio
- Libertarian Party of Oklahoma
- Libertarian Party of Oregon
- Libertarian Party of Pennsylvania
- Libertarian Party of Rhode Island
- Libertarian Party of South Dakota
- Libertarian Party of Texas
- Libertarian Party of Vermont
- Libertarian Party of Virginia
- Libertarian Party of Washington
- Libertarian Party of West Virginia
- New Jersey Libertarian Party

== See also ==
- Endorsements in the 2020 Democratic Party presidential primaries
- News media endorsements in the 2020 United States presidential primaries
- List of Joe Biden 2020 presidential campaign endorsements
- List of Donald Trump 2020 presidential campaign endorsements
- List of Howie Hawkins 2020 presidential campaign endorsements
