= List of state parties of the Libertarian Party (United States) =

In addition to the national Libertarian Party in the United States, 50 states operate a state Libertarian Party affiliated with the Libertarian National Committee, plus one representing the District of Columbia.

== List of parties ==
State/territorial party	Chairperson	Members	Upper house seats	Lower house seats	2020 ballot access	2022 ballot access
Libertarian Party of Alabama	Samuel Bohler		0 / 35	0 / 105	No	Provisional
Alaska Libertarian Party	Nicholas Conrad	7,137 (2019)	0 / 20	0 / 40	No	
Arizona Libertarian Party	Dru Heaton	32,374 (2019)	0 / 30	0 / 60	Yes	
Libertarian Party of Arkansas	Michael Pakko	330 (2017)	0 / 35	0 / 100	Provisional	
Libertarian Party of California	Loren Dean	153,348 (2019)	0 / 40	0 / 80	Yes	
Libertarian Party of Colorado	Keith Laube	39,308 (2017) ("Active" voters)	0 / 35	0 / 65	Yes	
Libertarian Party of Connecticut	Steve Dincher	2,959 (2018)	0 / 36	0 / 151	Yes	No
Libertarian Party of Delaware	Bill Hinds	2,220 (2023)	0 / 21	0 / 41	Yes	
Libertarian Party of Florida	Steven Nekhaila		0 / 40	0 / 120	Yes	
Libertarian Party of Georgia	Ryan Graham		0 / 56	0 / 180	Statewide offices	
Libertarian Party of Hawaii	Michelle Tippens		0 / 25	0 / 51	Yes	
Libertarian Party of Idaho	Jayson Sorensen		0 / 35	0 / 70	Yes	
Libertarian Party of Illinois	Chase Renwick		0 / 59	0 / 118	No	
Libertarian Party of Indiana	Evan McMahon		0 / 50	0 / 100	Yes	
Libertarian Party of Iowa	Jules Cutler		0 / 50	0 / 100	No	
Libertarian Party of Kansas	Tim Giblin	21,297	0 / 40	0 / 125	Yes	
Libertarian Party of Kentucky	Randall Daniel		0 / 38	0 / 100	Yes	No
Libertarian Party of Louisiana	Heide Alejandro-Smith	16,268	0 / 39	0 / 105	Yes	
Libertarian Party of Maine	Harrison Kemp		0 / 35	0 / 151	No	
Libertarian Party of Maryland	Eric Blitz		0 / 47	0 / 141	No	Yes
Libertarian Association of Massachusetts (affiliated pre-2022)	Disaffiliated in June 2022					
Unified Libertarians of Massachusetts (affiliated 2022–present)	David Burnham		0 / 40	0 / 160	Yes	No
Libertarian Party of Michigan	Joe Brungardt		0 / 38	0 / 110	Yes	
Libertarian Party of Minnesota	Charles Kuchlenz	212 (2014)	0 / 67	0 / 134	No	
Libertarian Party of Mississippi	Vicky Rose		0 / 52	0 / 122	Yes	
Libertarian Party of Missouri	Bill Slantz		0 / 34	0 / 163	Yes	
Montana Libertarian Party	Sid Daoud		0 / 50	0 / 100	Yes	
Libertarian Party of Nebraska	Chris Childs	18,101	0 / 49		Yes	
Libertarian Party of Nevada	Charles Melchin	17,554 (2021)	0 / 21	0 / 42	Yes	
Libertarian Party of New Hampshire (affiliated pre-2026)	Disaffiliated in May 2026					
Granite State Libertarian Party (affiliated 2026–present)			0 / 24	0 / 400	No	
New Jersey Libertarian Party	Nikhil Sureshkumar	24,026 (2025)	0 / 40	0 / 80	No	
Libertarian Party of New Mexico (affiliated pre-2022)	Disaffiliated in August 2022					
Free New Mexico Party (affiliated 2022–present)	Dereck Scott		0 / 42	0 / 70	No	
Libertarian Party of New York	Duane Whitmer	13,567 (2020)	0 / 63	0 / 150	Yes	No
Libertarian Party of North Carolina	Joseph Garcia		0 / 50	0 / 120	Yes	
Libertarian Party of North Dakota	Taylor Bakken		0 / 47	0 / 94	No	
Libertarian Party of Ohio	Dustin Nanna		0 / 33	0 / 99	Yes	
Libertarian Party of Oklahoma	Will Daugherty		0 / 48	0 / 101	Yes	
Libertarian Party of Oregon	Timothy Perkins	21,981 (2021)	0 / 30	0 / 60	Yes	
Libertarian Party of Pennsylvania	Rob Cowburn	45,469 (2021)	0 / 50	0 / 203	No	
Libertarian Party of Rhode Island	Bill Hunt		0 / 38	0 / 75	No	
Libertarian Party of South Carolina	Casey Crowe		0 / 46	0 / 124	Yes	
Libertarian Party of South Dakota	Greg Baldwin	2,429 (2021)	0 / 35	0 / 70	Yes	
Libertarian Party of Tennessee	Dave Jones		0 / 33	0 / 99	No	
Libertarian Party of Texas	Whitney Bilyeu		0 / 31	0 / 150	Yes	
Libertarian Party of Utah	Barry Short	22,381 (2021)	0 / 29	0 / 75	Yes	
Libertarian Party of Vermont	Olga Mardach-Duclerc		0 / 30	1 / 150	Yes	
Libertarian Party of Virginia	Jennifer Leatherbury		0 / 30	0 / 150	Yes	
Libertarian Party of Washington	Anna Johnson		0 / 49	0 / 98	No	
Libertarian Party of West Virginia	Will Hyman	8,891 (2021)	0 / 34	0 / 100	Yes	
Libertarian Party of Wisconsin	Jacob VandenPlas		0 / 33	0 / 99	No	Yes
Libertarian Party of Wyoming	Shawn Johnson	2,891	0 / 30	0 / 60	Yes	
Libertarian Party of the District of Columbia	Bruce Majors	1,628 (2019)	0 / 13		Yes	

== See also ==
- List of state parties of the Democratic Party (United States)
- List of state Green Parties in the United States
- List of state parties of the Republican Party (United States)
