= Policies of states in the United States =

Overview of the various political ideologies and policies of U.S. states

There has been multiple measurements of the political ideologies and policies of the states in the United States. Most measurements have found a significant shift towards cultural liberalism since 1970, while divergence in policies between the states has significantly increased since then.

Mississippi, Oklahoma, Louisiana, and Alabama rank among the most right-wing states. Massachusetts, Vermont, Hawaii, and Connecticut rank among the most left-wing states.

== Surveys ==
=== The Dynamics of State Policy Liberalism, 1936–2014 (2015) ===
The Dynamics of State Policy Liberalism, 1936–2014, published in 2015, found that states' positions on economic issues shifted significantly towards government interventionism between 1936 and 1970 while remaining relatively constant since. Social issues have drifted towards cultural liberalism.

It found that:

“Between 1936 and 1970, states just started doing a lot more, such as higher welfare benefits, and they taxed more,” says Devin Caughey, an assistant professor of political science at MIT and the other co-author of the study. “Then it stopped. And then economic policies have been constant, but social policies have gone in a more liberal direction.”

It also found that economic conservatism and social conservatism were generally correlated.

=== Dynamic Democracy by D. Caughey and C. Warshaw (2023) ===
It found that, overall, the large majority of states have moved significantly to the left since 1931.

States were also reported to have increasingly divergent policy since the 2000s.

== See also ==
- Political party strength in U.S. states
- Political polarization in the United States
