= Libertarian Party of West Virginia =

- Abbreviation: LPWV
- Chairperson: Taylor Richmond
- Secretary: David Prince
- Founder: John K. Brown
- Founded: 1994
- Ideology: Libertarianism; Non-interventionism; Fiscal conservatism Economic liberalism Cultural liberalism Laissez-faire

Website
- lpwv.org

The Libertarian Party of West Virginia is the state affiliate of the Libertarian Party in West Virginia. It has held official party status since 2012.

== History ==
After the founding of the national party in 1971, a small group of West Virginians including Harold Harvey of Beckley began working toward a state-level affiliate in 1972. They formed the West Virginia Libertarian Party, which would go on to join the 1980 West Virginia Socialist Workers Campaign Committee, the Socialist Workers, and John B. Anderson to challenge being shut out of the ballot, especially by filing fees, in court.

Having struck down the filing fees and the prohibition on running an independent, the first Libertarian candidate for statewide office in West Virginia was Jack K. Kelley of Parkersburg, who ran for governor in 1980.

The party's main period of activity was begun in 1994 when a group around John K. Brown, of Hurricane, including Dr. Wallace Johnson, Roger Fritz, John Sturgeon and David Wolfe set up the original bylaws and constitution of the Libertarian Party of West Virginia.

By May 10 1996 they had found over 23,000 signatories willing to forego their vote in the primary in order to put a Libertarian on the ballot. When the candidacy of Harry Browne and Jo Jorgensen for President and Vice-President was filed it was originally rejected, but that rejection was overturned by the court. The gubernatorial candidate, Wallace Johnson, received 2.6% of the vote, far more than the 1% needed to be qualified as a political party. They were the first party to qualify since 1924.

In 1998 William W. Clem became the party's first elected officer, and was reelected in 2002.

In 2012 the party returned to qualified status as engineer and farmer David Moran received 1.34% of votes in his gubernatorial race. He maintained that status in 2016 when he received the record number of 2.51%.

2018 saw Rusty Hollen receive 4.2% of the vote on his race for U.S. Senate, more than the 3.3% gap between the top two parties.

Erika Kolenich, a resident of Upshur county, broke Moran's record in 2020 when she received 2.86% of the vote, and performed similarly in the following gubernatorial election receiving 2.9%.

== Leadership ==
Executive Committee:

- Chair: Taylor Richmond
- Vice-Chair: Travis Bost
- Treasurer: Stephen T. Smith
- Secretary: David Prince
- Legislative Affairs: Erika Kolenich
- Outreach: Dustin Blankenship
- Region 1 Representative: Joseph Steiner
- Region 2 Representative: Tara Sheffer
- Region 3 Representative: Allie Oxenblood
- Region 4 Representative: Mike Masey

== See also ==
- List of state Libertarian Parties in the United States
