= Massachusetts Libertarians =

Massachusetts Libertarians may refer to:

- Liberty Alliance of Massachusetts, a libertarian political party in Massachusetts, Formerly Nationally affiliated with the Libertarian National Committee, currently affiliated with Liberal Party USA
- Unified Libertarians of Massachusetts, the Current Libertarian National Committee affiliate
