= Libertarian Party of Illinois =

State affiliate of the Libertarian Party

- Chairperson: Ray Walden IV
- Secretary: Alexa Maffei
- Senate leader: None
- House leader: None
- Founded: 1971
- Ideology: Libertarianism
- National affiliation: Libertarian Party
- Colors: Blue; Yellow
- Illinois Senate: 0 / 59
- Illinois House of Representatives: 0 / 118
- U.S. Senate (Illinois): 0 / 2
- U.S. House of Representatives (Illinois): 0 / 17
- Other elected officials: 11

The Libertarian Party of Illinois is the Illinois affiliate of the Libertarian Party. The current chair is Ray Walden IV. There are eleven Libertarian officeholders in Illinois.

== Mission statement ==
Libertarian Party of Illinois mission is: To elect Libertarians to office and move public policy in a libertarian direction.

== Key tenets ==
Key tenets of the Libertarian Party platform include the following:

- Adoption of laissez-faire principles to reduce the state's role in economic government. This would include, among other things, markedly reduced taxation, privatization of Social Security and welfare (for individuals, as well as elimination of "corporate welfare"), markedly reduced regulation of business, rollbacks of labor regulations, and reduction of government interference in foreign trade.
- Protection of property rights.
- Minimal government bureaucracy. The Libertarian Party states that the government's responsibilities should be limited to the protection of individual rights from the initiation of force and fraud.
- Civil libertarianism: Support for the protection of civil liberties, including the right to privacy, freedom of speech, freedom of association, and sexual freedom.
- Opposition to laws such as affirmative action and some non-discrimination laws in the private sector.
- Support for the unrestricted right to the means of self-defense (such as gun rights, the right to carry mace, pepper spray, or tasers etc.).
- Abolition of laws against "victimless crimes" (such as prostitution, seat belt laws, use of controlled substances, fraternization, etc.).
- Opposition to regulations on how businesses should run themselves (e.g. smoking bans)
- A foreign policy of free trade and non-interventionism.
- Support for a fiscally responsible government including a hard currency (commodity-based money supply as opposed to fiat currency).
- Abolition of all forms of taxpayer-funded assistance (welfare, food stamps, public housing, Health care, etc.)
- A pro-choice belief that abortion is a personal issue, and should not be part of government.

== History ==
=== Legislative changes ===
==== Full slate requirement ====
In 2012 the party sued the Board of Elections over a 1931 law requiring any third party, but not Republicans or Democrats, to run a full slate of candidates in order to get any of them on the ballot. The case, Libertarian Party of Illinois v. Scholz, was decided on September 22, 2017 by the Seventh Circuit court. They found the law to be a violation of the constitutional right of political association under the First and Fourteenth Amendments that the rule burdens a candidate's right to run as his party's standard bearer, rejecting claims that it encouraged frivolous candidates and ballot overcrowding.

==== Libertarian Party of Illinois v. Pritzker ====
The party successfully sued Governor J.B. Pritzker to skip the signature requirements in 2020 if a party had qualified in 2016 or 2018 when the response to COVID-19 made traditional petition signature collection impossible. This April decision caused any future suits on the same subject to expect success. By October of that year, 39 states had made changes to election dates, procedures, and/or administration.

=== Established party status ===
After the 1994 general election, the Libertarian Party achieved established party status for statewide offices in Illinois. This occurred after its candidates for the then-elected University of Illinois Board of Trustees cumulatively received 5.5% of all votes cast. After the party's success in the 1998 election for Ford County Sheriff and other countywide offices, it achieved established party status. Due to its second place showing over the then-dormant Democratic Party in that election, the Libertarians received the minority party's seat on the Board of Review and one of the five seats on the Sheriff's Merit Commission. This status was lost by 2002 after the Libertarian Party failed to field any candidates in the 2002 general election.

As of January 17, 2024, the party has established party status in Cook, McLean, and Tazewell counties. (Note: While the Libertarian Party of Illinois lists DeWitt, Kankakee, McHenry, and Peoria counties as being established political parties, the case Joseph J. Tirio v. Libertarian Party of Illinois et al. indicates that the lack of a 2022 candidate means DeWitt, Kankakee, McHenry, and Peoria counties which did not run candidates in 2022 that won 5%+ of the vote lost their established party. Additionally, the Montgomery County primary ballot does not include the Libertarian Party as an option for established party status.)

== Elected officeholders ==
As of May 6, 2026, there are 11 current elected Libertarians, partisan and nonpartisan, in the state of Illinois. Due to the technical issues regarding the CiviCRM transition to Zoho CRM, there is no elected official page at this time.

The current list of elected officials in Illinois from the Libertarian Party, as confirmable through the state party's website, as well as the national party's internal wiki website LPedia, as well as a February 21, 2025 article published in Independent Political Report:

- Brody Anderson, trustee of the River Valley Library District Board of Trustees (Port Byron)
- Patrick Liapes, trustee of the Poplar Creek Library Board (Streamwood)
- Kelly Liebmann, township trustee of Greenwood Township
- Aisha Pickett, city treasurer of the City of Harvey (Harvey)
- Christopher Laurent, council member of the Chicago Police Council's 14th District (Chicago)
- Justin Gerstner, village president of the Village of Hamel (Hamel)
- Brandon Wisenburg, trustee of the Village of Peoria Heights (Peoria Heights)
- Justin Tucker, Libertarian ward committeeperson, Chicago 1st Ward
- Nico Tsatsoulis, Libertarian ward committeeperson, Chicago 5th Ward
- Jim Humay, Libertarian ward committeeperson, Chicago 36th Ward
- Jake Leonard, trustee of the Nokomis Township Public Library District (Nokomis)

== Electoral history 1998–2020 ==
=== 2020 campaigns ===
Office	Candidate	Votes	Percentage
President	Jo Jorgensen	66,544	1.10%
Vice President	Spike Cohen	66,544	1.10%
US Senate	Danny Malouf	75,673	1.27%
US House 6	Bill Redpath	7,079	1.75%
US House 8	Preston Gabriel Nelson	68,327	26.84%
IL House 19	Joseph Schreiner	1,544	3.24%
IL House 55	Glenn Olofson	12,000	27.42%
IL House 78	Joshua Flynn	8.559	16.67%
IL House 80	Clayton Cleveland	9,940	20.19%
IL House 88	Kenneth Allison	2,549	4.46%
IL House 92	Chad Grimm	9,890	25.49%
IL House 103	Brad Bielert	8,452	21.35%
IL House 113	Mark Elmore	5,799	13.27%
IL House 115	Ian Peak	3,655	8.27%
Cook County State's Attorney	Brian Dennehy	147,769	6.71%
DeKalb County Board Dist. 5	Sasha Cohen	566	24.07%
DeWitt County Circuit Clerk	Nathan Florey	1,194	16.11%
Kankakee County Auditor	Kyle Evans	9,477	21.59%
Kankakee County Circuit Clerk	Nicole Scott	2,675	5.53%
Kankakee County Board Dist. 13	Jacob Collins ✅	677	100%
Kankakee County Board Dist. 23	Jim Byrne (inc.)	537	40.99%
McLean County Auditor	Kevin Woodard		
McLean County Board Dist. 3	Derek Evans		
McLean County Board Dist. 5	Jo Anne Litwiller		
McLean County Board Dist. 6	David Scarpelli		
McLean County Board Dist. 7	Darin George Kaeb		
McHenry County Auditor	James Young		
McHenry County Coroner	Kelly Liebmann		
Montgomery County Board Dist. 2	Jake Leonard	162	5.56%
Peoria County Auditor	Joe Rusch	4,701	17.33%
Peoria County County Clerk	Ann Agama	4,519	16.45%
Peoria County Coroner	K. Eric Schaffer	3,148	11.21%
Peoria County Board Dist. 11	Chris Buckely	533	27.10%
Peoria County Board Dist. 17	Tom Inman	281	18.86%
Tazewell County Auditor	Kaden Nelms	12,140	19.51%
Tazewell County Board Chairman	Eric Stahl	13,291	21.27%

=== 2018 campaigns ===
Office	Candidate	Votes	Percentage
Governor	Kash Jackson	109,518	2.4%
Lieutenant Governor	Sanj Mohip	109,518	2.4%
Attorney General	Bubba Harsy	115,941	2.6%
Secretary of State	Steve Dutner	114,556	2.5%
Treasurer	Mike Leheney	155,256	3.5%
Comptroller	Claire Ball	140,543	3.1%

=== 2016 campaigns ===
Office	Candidate	Votes	Percentage
President	Gary Johnson	206,351	3.8%
Vice President	William Weld	206,351	3.8%
US Senate	Kent McMillen	175,988	3.2%
Comptroller	Claire Ball	187,017	3.5%

=== 2014 campaigns ===
Office	Candidate	Votes	Percentage
US Senate	Sharon Hansen	135,316	3.8%
Governor	Chad Grimm	121,534	3.4%
Lieutenant Governor	A. J. Cummings	121,534	3.4%
Attorney General	Ben Koyl	99,903	2.8%
Secretary of State	Christopher Michel	104,498	2.9%
Comptroller	Julie Fox	170,534	4.8%
Treasurer	Matthew Skopek	146,654	4.2%

=== 2012 campaigns ===
Office	Candidate	Votes	Percentage
President	Gary Johnson	56,229	1.1%
Vice President	Jim Gray	56,229	1.1%

=== 2010 campaigns ===
Office	Candidate	Votes	Percentage
US Senate	Mike Labno	87,247	2.4%
Governor	Lex Green	34,681	0.9%
Lieutenant Governor	Ed Rutledge	34,681	0.9%
Attorney General	Bill Malan	54,532	1.5%
Secretary of State	Josh Hanson	115,458	3.1%
Comptroller	Julie Fox	121,068	3.3%
Treasurer	James Pauly	68,803	1.9%

=== 2008 campaigns ===
Office	Candidate	Votes	Percentage
President	Bob Barr	19,645	0.4%
Vice President	Wayne Root	19,645	0.4%
US Senate	Larry Stafford	50,228	0.9%

=== 2006 campaigns ===
Office	Candidate	Votes	Percentage
Congress 2	Anthony Williams	5,422	3.3%

=== 2004 campaigns ===
Office	Candidate	Votes	Percentage
President	Michael Badnarik	32,442	0.6%
Vice President	Richard Campagna	32,442	0.6%
US Senate	Jerry Kohn	69,253	1.4%
Congress 2	Stephanie Sailor	26,990	11.5%
Congress 4	Jake Witmer	4,845	3.9%
Congress 12	Walter Steele	4,794	1.7%
State Rep 11	Jason Briggeman	1,770	4.0%
State Rep 53	Scott Bludorn	3,673	8.2%
State Rep 64	Jim Young	2,022	4.0%
State Rep 85	Austin Hough	7,945	25.1%
State Rep 95	Steve Dubovik	1,317	2.9%

=== 2002 campaigns ===
Office	Candidate	Votes	Percentage
Governor	Cal Skinner	73,794	2.1%
Lieutenant Governor	Jim Tobin	73,794	2.1%
Secretary of State	Matt Beauchamp	78,830	2.2%
Attorney General	Gary Shilts	87,949	2.5%
Treasurer	Rhys Read	66,593	1.9%
Comptroller	Julie Fox	144,066	4.2%
US Senate	Steven Burgauer	57,382	1.7%
Congress 1	Dorothy Tsatsos	4,741	2.6%
Congress 4	Maggie Kohls	4,328	5.2%
Congress 5	Frank Gonzalez	6,638	4.3%
Congress 7	Martin Pankau	2,436	1.5%
Congress 9	Stephanie Sailor	4,779	2.9%
State Rep 11	John Yackley	3,371	12.8%
State Rep 28	Jerome Kohn	1,241	4.2%
State Rep 41	John Tepley	1,034	2.8%
State Rep 42	Michael Mandel	1,123	3.3%
State Rep 48	Chandler Hadraba	3,440	11.2%
State Rep 52	Matthew Paul Burns	1,190	3.9%
State Rep 64	Jim Young	2,214	7.4%
State Rep 85	Eric Ferguson	4,922	20.3%
State Rep 95	Steve Dubovik	4,191	14.6%

=== 2000 campaigns ===
Office	Candidate	Votes	Percentage
President	Harry Browne	11,623	0.3%
Vice President	Art Olivier	11,623	0.3%
Congress 4	Stephanie Sailor	11,476	11.3%
Congress 5	Matt Beauchamp	20,728	12.7%
State Rep 34	R. Brian Poynton	1,230	4.0%
State Rep 39	Elizabeth Quaintance	10,103	26.2%

=== 1998 campaigns ===
Office	Candidate	Votes	Percentage
Congress 1	Marjorie Kohls	4,046	2.3%
Congress 2	Matt Beauchamp	1,608	1.0%
Congress 4	William Passmore	1,583	2.4%
Congress 6	George Meyers	4,199	2.5%
Congress 7	Dorn Van Cleave	9,984	7.1%
Congress 9	Michael Ray	3,284	2.3%

== Other chapters ==
Other than its established party chapters, the Libertarian Party of Illinois also includes:

- Bond County Libertarians
- Champaign County Libertarian Party
- Clinton County Libertarian Party
- DeWitt County Libertarian Party
- DuPage Libertarians
- Fox Valley Libertarian Party, now defunct
- Illinois Valley Libertarians
- Kankakee County Libertarian Party
- Macoupin County Libertarian Party
- McHenry County Libertarians
- McLean County Libertarian Party
- Metro-East Libertarian Party
- Libertarian Party of Chicago
- Libertarian Party of DeKalb County
- Libertarian Party of Greater Peoria
- Libertarian Party of Lake County
- Libertarian Party of Macon County
- Libertarian Party of Northwestern Illinois
- Libertarian Party of Will County
- Libertarian Party of Whiteside County
- Southern Illinois Libertarian Party
- Warren County Libertarian Party
- Western Illinois Libertarian Party

== See also ==
- List of state Libertarian Parties in the United States
