= Libertarian Party (United States) =

Political party in the United States

- Abbreviation: LP
- Chairperson: Evan McMahon
- Governing body: Libertarian National Committee
- Founder: David Nolan
- Founded: December 11, 1971; 54 years ago
- Registered voters (July 2026): 695,779 (0.55%)
- Ideology: Libertarianism; Right-libertarianism; Cultural liberalism; Factions: Anarcho-capitalism; Paleolibertarianism; Nozickianism; Minarchism; Classical liberalism
- Political position: Right-wing (Note: The majority of the Libertarian Party is right-wing and right-libertarian, as is most libertarianism in the United States.)
- International affiliation: International Alliance of Libertarian Parties
- Colors: Gold
- Slogan: The Party of Principle
- Senate: 0 / 100
- House of Representatives: 0 / 435
- State governors: 0 / 50
- State upper chambers: 0 / 1,972
- State lower chambers: 0 / 5,411
- Territorial governors: 0 / 5
- Seats in territorial upper chambers: 0 / 97
- Seats in territorial lower chambers: 0 / 91
- Other elected officials: 148 (September 2025)

Election symbol

Website
- www.lp.org

The Libertarian Party (LP) is a right-libertarian political party in the United States. The party promotes libertarianism, specifically fiscal conservatism and laissez-faire capitalism, civil libertarianism and cultural liberalism, foreign non-interventionism, and limiting the size and scope of government.

The world's first explicitly libertarian party, the party was officially formed on December 11, 1971. Party organizers opposed the Nixon administration's wage and price controls, the Vietnam War and conscription, and the end of the Gold Standard and introduction of fiat money. The organizers of the party drew inspiration from the works and ideas of the prominent Austrian school economist Murray Rothbard.

The Libertarians support economic right-libertarian positions, including disbanding Medicare and Medicaid in favor of free-market healthcare, eliminating social insurance such as Social Security and food stamps in favor of private charities, ending public funding for schools, abolishing the Internal Revenue Service (IRS), and abolishing the Federal Reserve System in favor of free banking. The Libertarians support cultural liberal positions, including legalization of all drugs and victimless crimes, ending capital punishment, supporting same-sex marriage, and supporting the right to keep and bear arms. In 2013, Gary Johnson, the party's presidential nominee in 2012 and 2016, said the party is more socially liberal than Democrats and more fiscally conservative than Republicans. The Libertarian Party contains several major factions with competing visions.

As of 2026, the Libertarians are the 4th-largest political party in the United States by Presidential vote, behind the Green Party of the United States, and 3rd-largest by voter registration. (Note: Voter registration ranks are listed here. This list excludes the many different "Independent" parties, with which many voters register in error, and which usually do not run any competitive candidates.) The Libertarian Party has had some wins in local elections and very few wins in state or federal elections.

Logo from 1980 to 2015

== History ==
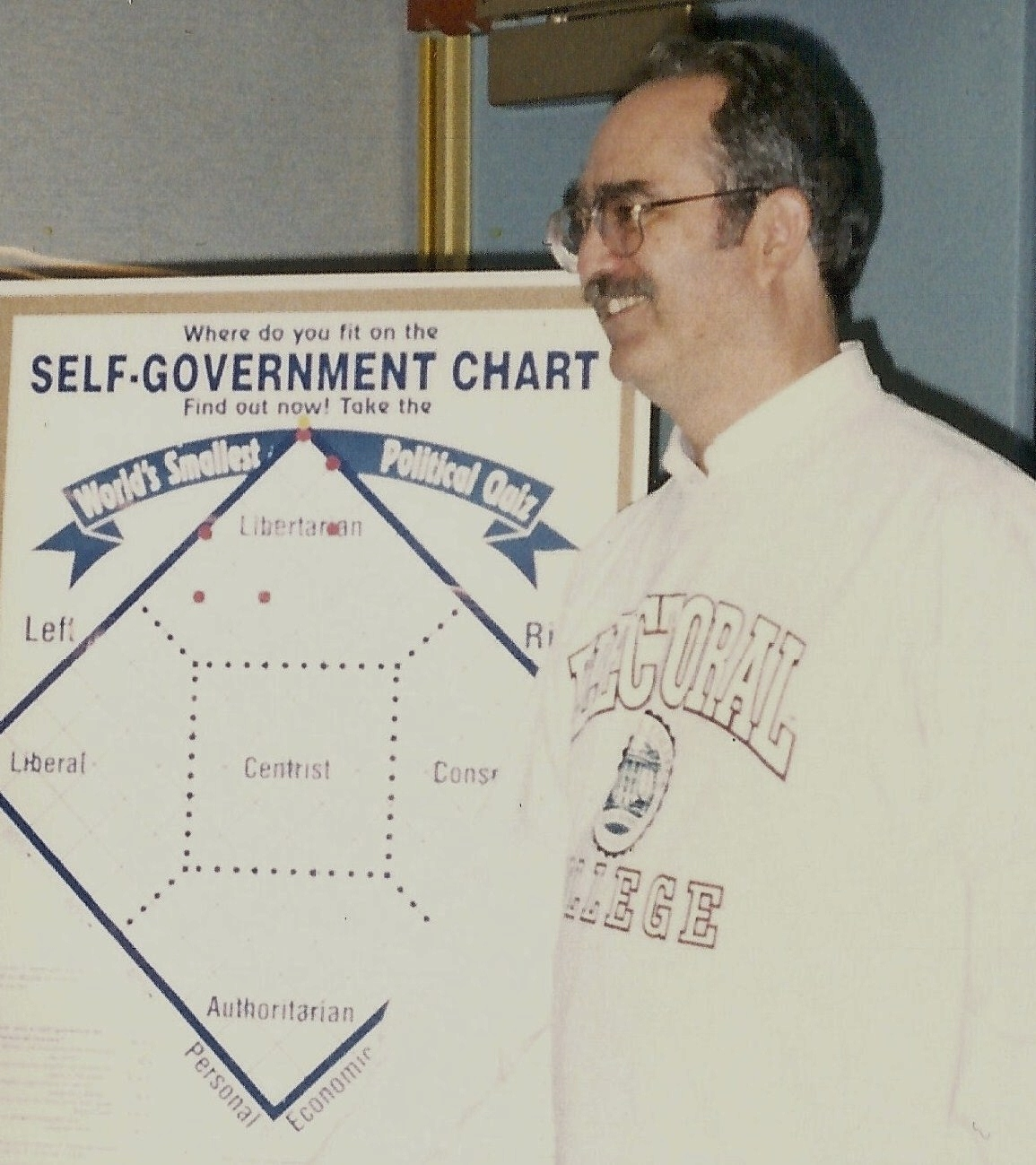
David Nolan, founder of the Libertarian Party, with the Nolan Chart in 1996

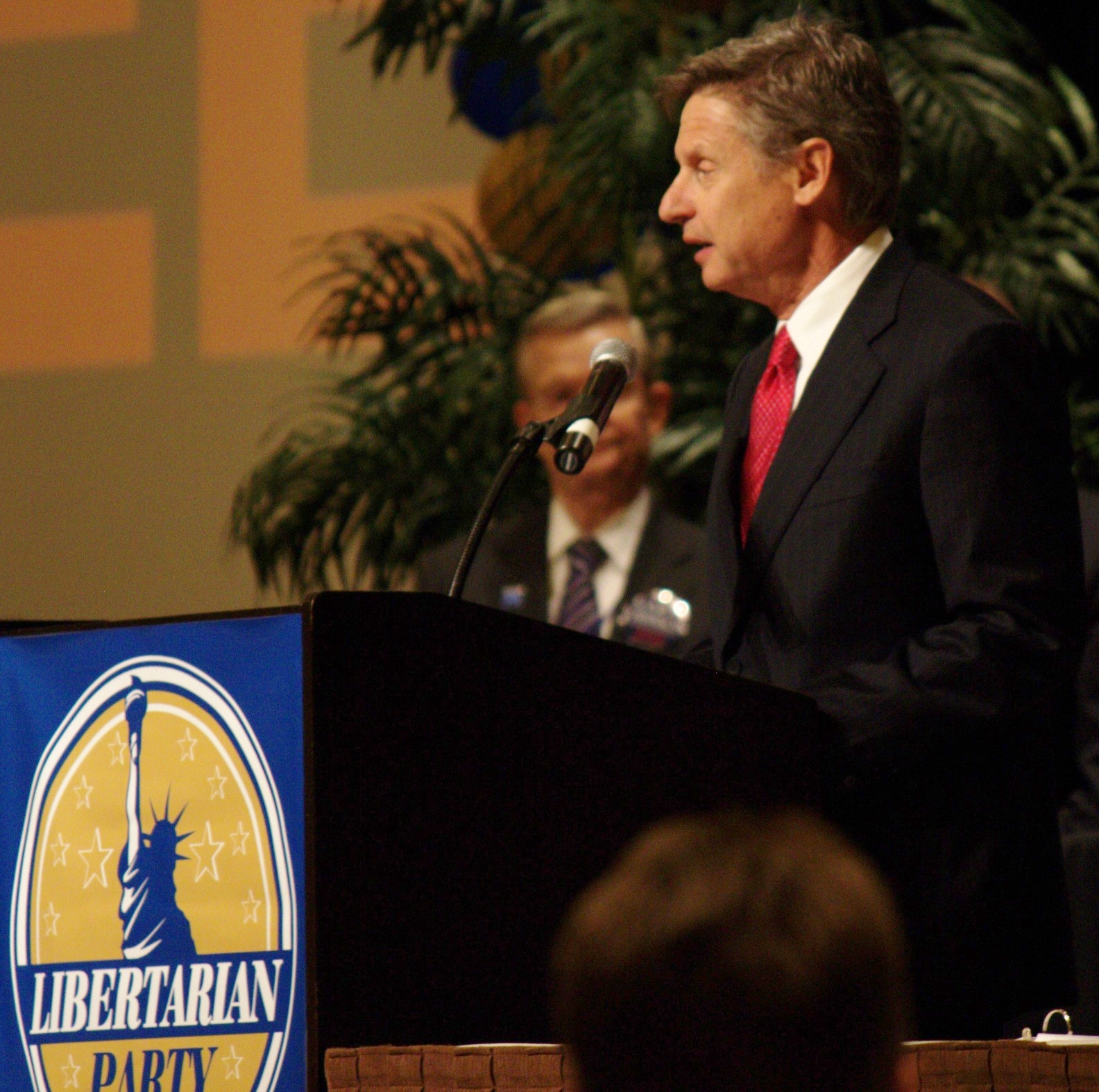
Former Governor Gary Johnson during the 2012 presidential election

The first Libertarian National Convention was held in June 1972. In 1978, Dick Randolph of Alaska became the first elected Libertarian state legislator. Following the 1980 federal elections, the Libertarian Party assumed the title of being the third-largest party for the first time after the American Independent Party and the Conservative Party of New York (the other largest minor parties at the time) continued to decline. In 1994, over 40 Libertarians were elected or appointed, which was a record for the party at that time. 1995 saw a soaring membership and voter registration for the party. In 1996, the Libertarian Party became the first third party to earn ballot status in all 50 states two presidential elections in a row.

In the 2012 Presidential election, Libertarian candidate and former New Mexico Governor Gary Johnson received over 1.2 million votes, the highest for any Libertarian to date. He was renominated for president in 2016, this time choosing former Massachusetts Governor William "Bill" Weld as his running mate. Johnson/Weld shattered the Libertarian record for a presidential ticket, earning over 4.4 million votes. In the 2016 Presidential election, Gary Johnson won over 4.4 million votes (3.3% of the total), the highest for any Libertarian before or since. Johnson was particularly popular in Johnson's home state of New Mexico, earning 9.3% of the vote. Both Johnson and Green Party presidential candidate Jill Stein received significantly more news coverage in 2016 than third-party candidates usually get, with polls showing both candidates potentially increasing their support over the last election, especially among younger voters.

In the 2020 Wyoming House election, Libertarian Marshall Burt won a seat in the Wyoming House of Representatives, the first state legislature win for the party since 2000. The first and only Libertarian in the United States Congress was Justin Amash, who joined the Libertarian Party in 2020 and left the US House of Representatives in 2021 after choosing not to seek re-election.

The Libertarian Party contains several major factions with competing visions. In 2022, the paleolibertarian Mises Caucus (LPMC) won a majority on the Libertarian National Committee and shifted the party in a fiscal- and social-conservative direction. The change resulted in internal conflicts and significant policy changes. Several state chapters distanced or disavowed themselves of the National Committee and formed their own independent state-level parties. Other defectors formed the Classical Liberal Caucus and Liberal Party USA. In 2024, Mises won again. In 2025, "unity" candidate Steven Nekhaila was elected as party Chair. In 2026, anti-Mises candidates won. The new LNC disaffiliated the Mises-leaning Libertarian Party of New Hampshire, which had endorsed Donald Trump over Chase Oliver in 2024 and endorsed assassinating elected Democrats. LPNH leader Jeremy Kauffman appealed, which the LNC unanimously denied.

== Federal influence ==
During the 2024 campaign the chairperson of the Libertarian Party, Angela McArdle, had a meeting arranged with presidential candidate Donald Trump by his former Director of National Intelligence, Richard Grenell. Ignoring Grenell's advice to "ask for whatever you think you can get" in order to negotiate, she asked only for the release of Ross Ulbricht from his multiple life sentences for his role in founding and operating the Silk Road. McArdle agreed to only back its presidential candidate in non-competitive states favoring Democrats, which resulted in the lowest Libertarian Party vote share in 16 years while Trump won several swing states by thin margins. Ulbricht received a full pardon, which was called "the largest impact the Libertarian Party has ever had at the federal level" by McArdle.

In 2024 the Colorado affiliate was able to implement a Liberty Pledge strategy. The Libertarian candidate had received approximately six times the spread between Republican and Democratic candidates on a newly created District for U.S. Congress in 2022. In the next election, the Republican candidate signed a Liberty Pledge, an agreement to meet certain "strong liberty minded" standards while in office, in exchange for removing competition from the Libertarian candidate. That candidate was then able to beat the Democratic candidate by a "razor-thin" margin (less than a third of the prior election's Libertarian votes) where he had previously lost.

== Political positions ==
The Libertarian Party platform preamble outlines the party's goals: "As Libertarians, we seek a world of liberty; a world in which all individuals are sovereign over their own lives and no one is forced to sacrifice his or her values for the benefit of others."

The party supports laissez-faire capitalism with minimally regulated markets and minimal social spending. The party favors a less powerful federal government, strong civil liberties, cultural liberalism, the liberalization of drug laws, separation of church and state, open immigration, free trade and free movement to all foreign countries, non-interventionism and neutrality in diplomatic relations, and a more representative republic.

Paul H. Rubin, professor of law and economics at Emory University, believes that while liberal Democrats generally seek to control economic activities and conservative Republicans generally seek to control consumption activities such as sexual behavior, abortion and so on, the Libertarian Party is the largest political party in the United States that advocates few or no regulations in what it deems "social" and "economic" issues.

=== Economic issues ===
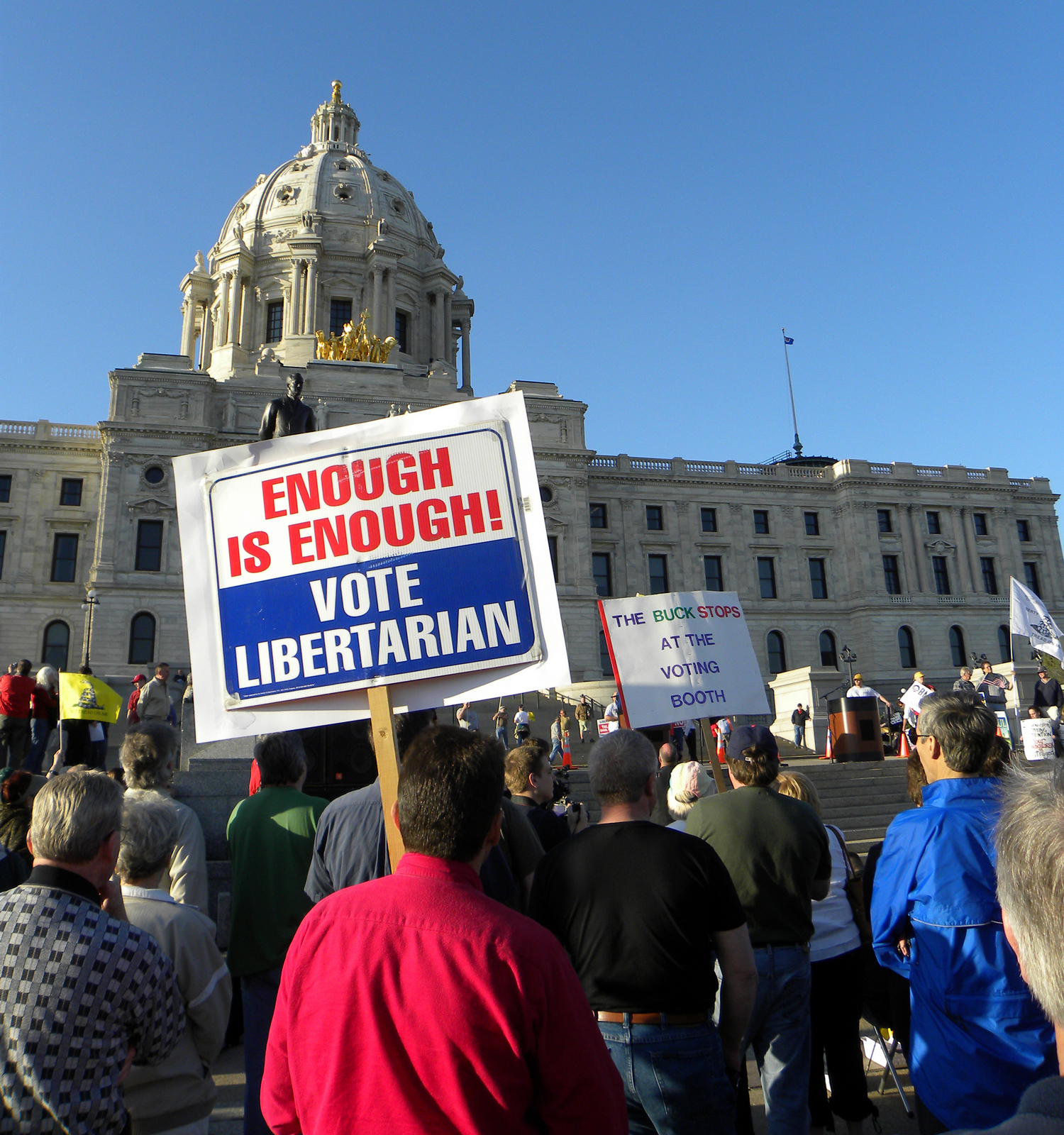
Libertarian protester at the 2010 Tea Party tax day, St. Paul, Minnesota

The LP supports eliminating all social insurance and social spending, including food stamps, and says that private charity will "bridge the gap". The LP seeks to eliminate public funding for education, saying that children's education is "best provided by the free market". The LP supports free market health care by repeal of Medicare, Medicaid, and all other social health insurance programs. The LP seeks to phase out Social Security, in favor of private retirement savings and private charity.

The LP opposes any regulation of markets, and says the "only proper role of government in the economic realm is to protect property rights, adjudicate disputes, and provide a legal framework" for "voluntary trade". The LP strongly opposes minimum wage laws. The LP advocates the repeal of all laws restricting advertisement. The LP supports free-market environmentalism, saying that strong property rights would yield a clean, healthy environment, because private landowners of natural resources and other ecological services would seek to maintain their value.

The LP supports international free trade in capital and open borders for labor.

The LP supports seeks to abolish the Federal Reserve System and fiat money in favor of free banking, in which any bank may issue its own currency, as during the US "free banking" era.

=== Social issues ===
The LP supports freedom of speech and opposes all state censorship. The LP supports a right to privacy and opposes mass surveillance.

The LP supports an absolute right of self-defense, and supports the right to keep and bear arms without any registration or restriction on the ownership, manufacture, transfer, or sale of firearms or ammunition.

Libertarians have divided opinions on capital punishment. Since 2016, the LP opposes "administration of the death penalty by the state". The LP seeks to expand rights of the accused and abolish qualified immunity for police to reduce excessive force.

The LP opposes state marriage licensing, saying all consenting adults should be free to pursue any relationship they desire. The LP has always opposed sodomy laws against homosexuality and laws against polygamy. In 1996, the LP enacted a plank supporting same-sex marriage. Many queer Libertarians have run for office. The LP has had many LGBT caucuses, including the Outright Libertarians. Libertarians have divided opinions on non-discrimination laws protecting LGBT people. Some Libertarians support non-discrimination laws, while others reject them as violating freedom of association.

The Libertarian Party supports legalization of all victimless crimes, including all drugs and gambling. The LP opposes any regulation of obscenity or pornography as "an abridgment of liberty of expression". The LP supports decriminalization of sex work and legalization of prostitution. Many men and women with backgrounds in prostitution and activists for sex workers' rights, such as Norma Jean Almodovar and Starchild, have run for office on the Libertarian Party ticket or been active in the party.

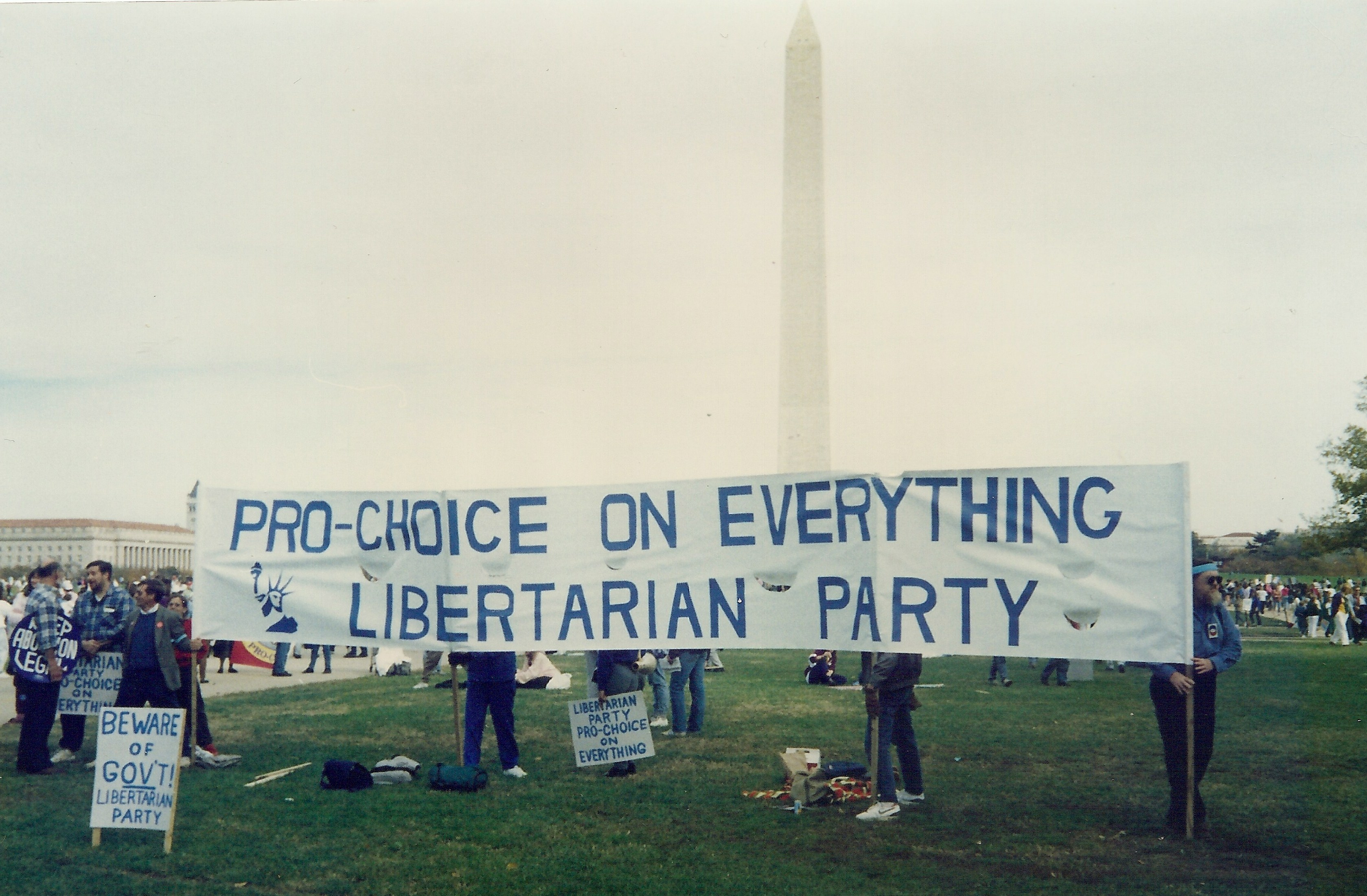
Libertarian Party members at a pro-choice rally in Washington, DC, November 12, 1989

Libertarians have divided opinions on abortion. Some, like Libertarians for Life, consider abortion to be an act of aggression against a child, therefore necessitating government intervention to prevent it. Others, like Pro-Choice Libertarians, consider denying a woman the right to choose abortion to be an act of aggression from the government against her. The party has nominated both anti-abortion and abortion rights candidates. Pro-choice presidential candidates include Gary Johnson in 2012 and 2016 and Jo Jorgensen in 2020. Pro-life presidential candidates include Ron Paul in 1988 and Bob Barr in 2008. The LP platform was pro-choice from 1972 until 2022, when the abortion plank was deleted.

=== Democratic reform ===
The LP supports direct democracy through referendum and recall processes. The LP opposes restrictive ballot access laws and gerrymandering. The LP opposes publicly funded elections and supports repeal of all laws restricting election finance.

=== Foreign policy ===
The LP opposes US intervention abroad, seeking "peace with all nations, entangling alliances with none". The LP supports cutting all foreign aid and withdrawing all American troops. The LP supports US withdrawal from NATO.

== Structure and composition ==
The Libertarian Party is democratically governed by its members, with state affiliate parties each holding annual or biennial conventions at which delegates are elected to attend the party's biennial national convention. National convention delegates vote on changes to the party's national platform and bylaws and elect officers and "at-large" representatives to the party's National Committee. The National Committee also has "regional representatives", some of whom are appointed by delegate caucuses at the national convention whereas others are appointed by the chairpersons of LP state affiliate chapters within a region.

=== National committees ===
The Libertarian National Committee (LNC) is a 27-member body including alternates, or 17 voting members. Since February 2, 2025, the chair is currently Steven Nekhaila of Florida, who was elected by the LNC in a special election.

=== Membership ===
Individuals can join the Libertarian Party by signing their agreement with the organization's non-aggression pledge. (Note: During the mid-1980s and into the early 1990s, the pledge-based membership category was called an "instant" membership, now referred to as "signature members".) Therefore, some Libertarian Party donors are not necessarily "members", because the party has defined a "member" since its founding as someone who agrees with the party's membership statement. The Libertarian Party reported 138,815 signature members in December 2017.

Members can pay dues, currently at $25 per year or $1,500 for a lifetime. Most participation and voting rights are restricted to dues-paying and lifetime members. Dues to join the Committee to Form a Libertarian Party in 1971 were $2, which gradually increased to $15 for basic membership in the party in 1984. In 1991 dues were increased to $25, where they remain as of 2026. The Libertarian Party reported 14,445 dues-paying and life members in December 2017, and 9,348 in October 2025.

In 2006, national party membership was separated from state affiliate party membership, with each state maintaining its own membership rolls. Most state parties require dues payment, while some require voter registration as a Libertarian.

=== Registered voters ===
As of July 2026 the Libertarian Party has 695,779 (0.55%) registered voters, the 3rd-highest in the United States. California has the most registered Libertarians, at 231,107 (1.00%), while Kansas has the highest proportion, at 23,781 (1.18%).

== Officeholders ==
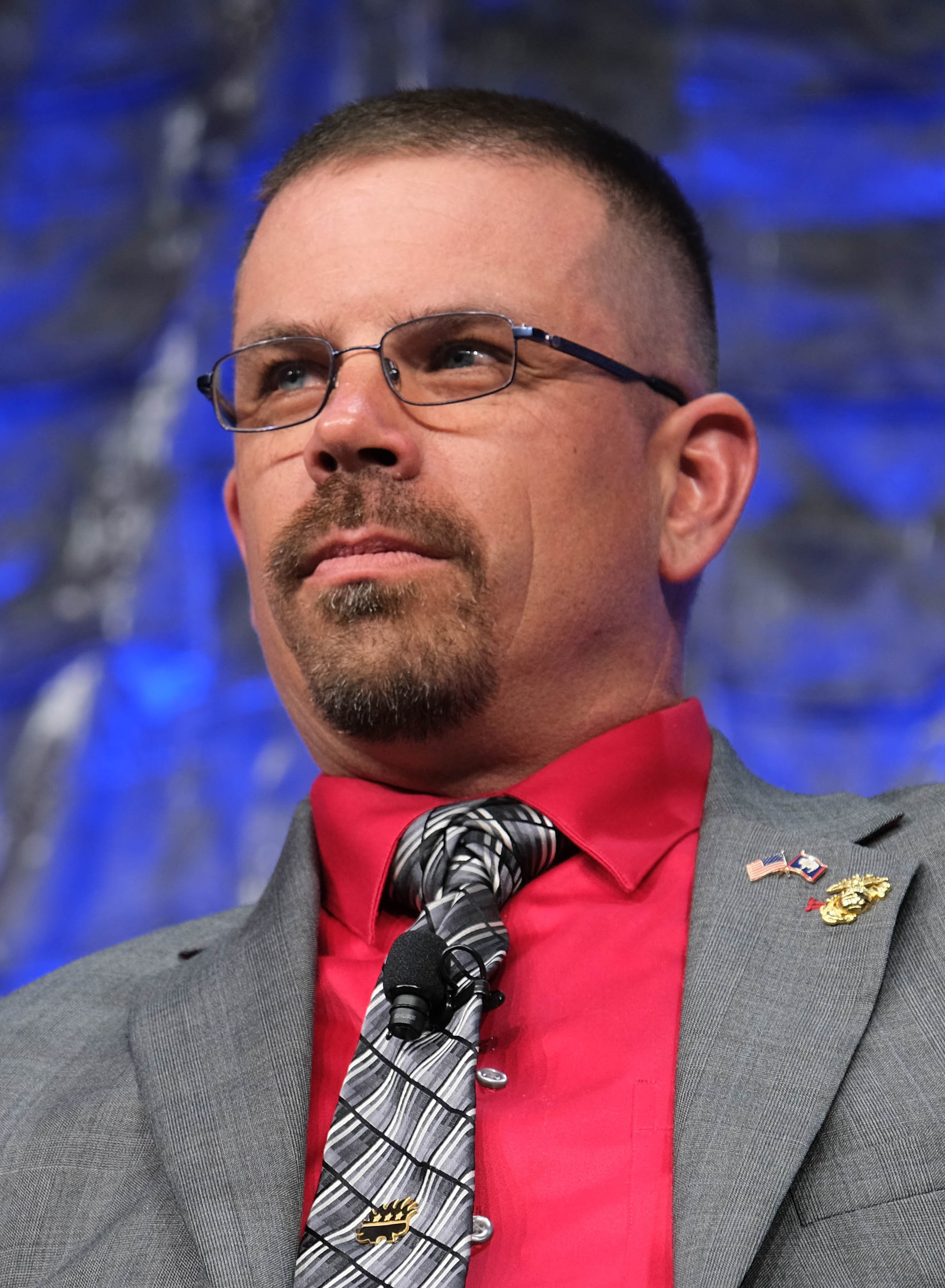
Former Wyoming State Representative Marshall Burt (L–Green River)

In 2009, the Libertarian Party claimed 146 Libertarians in elected offices. In 2017, it claimed 168 Libertarians in elected offices, 58 partisan and 110 non-partisan. In addition, some party members were elected to public office on other party lines but explicitly retained their Libertarian Party membership. For example, US Representative Ron Paul has repeatedly stated that he remains a life member of the Libertarian Party.

The Libertarian Party has had limited electoral success at the state legislature and local level. Since the party's creation, 10 Libertarians have been elected to state legislatures and some other state legislators have switched parties after being originally elected as Republicans or Democrats. The Libertarian Party has never won a statewide or federal election.

=== Local offices ===
Notable Libertarian local officeholders in the 2020s include Vermont Representative Jarrod E. Sammis, Mayor of Wichita Lily Wu, and Mayor of Cedar Falls Rob Green.

In 2018, Jeff Hewitt, the mayor of Calimesa, California was elected to the Riverside County Board of Supervisors in a close race. Serving from 2019 to 2023, including 1-year stints as chair & vice-chair of the board from 2021 to 2023, Hewitt was considered the most powerful Libertarian elected official in California and in the United States during his tenure.

=== State legislatures ===
The Libertarian Party has had limited electoral success in state legislatures. Libertarians have been elected as state representatives without a major party cross-endorsement six times: Dick Randolph in Alaska in 1978, Ken Fanning and Randolph again in Alaska in 1980, Andre Marrou in Alaska in 1984, Steve Vaillancourt in New Hampshire in 2000, and in 2020, Marshall Burt received 54% of the vote in a two-way race in Wyoming's 39th House district in the Wyoming House of Representatives.

Several Libertarians have won election to state legislative offices on an electoral fusion line with a major party. For example, in 1992, Don Gorman and Andy Borsa won election to the New Hampshire House on a Libertarian-Republican fusion ballot. Similarly, in 1998, Neil Randall won election to the Vermont House of Representatives on a Libertarian-Republican fusion ballot. As of 2020, there have also been 67 candidates elected with a Libertarian and a major party cross endorsement: 37 in New Hampshire in 1992, 5 in New Hampshire in 1994, 4 in New Hampshire in 1996, 1 in Vermont in 1998, 5 in Oregon in 2014, 4 in Oregon in 2018, 4 in Oregon in 2020, and 7 in New York in 2020. There have been 14 candidates elected to state senate who had a Libertarian and major party cross endorsement: 1 in New Hampshire in 1992, 6 in New Hampshire in 1994, 3 in New Hampshire in 1996, 1 in Oregon in 2014, 1 in Oregon in 2018, 1 in New York in 2019, and 1 in New York in 2020.

=== Defections from other parties ===
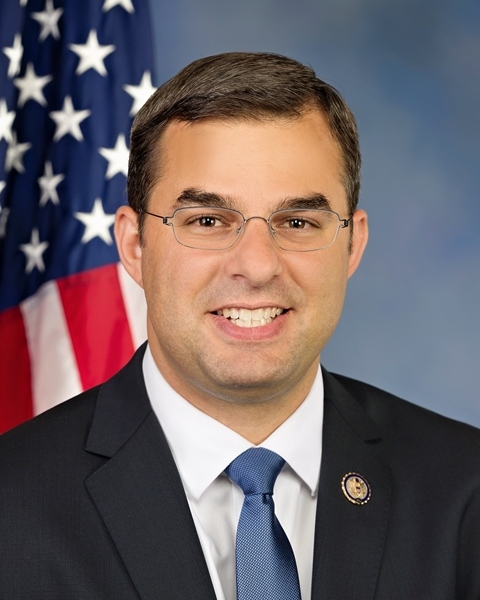
Representative Justin Amash, the first Libertarian member of Congress

In 1991, New Hampshire House of Representatives members Calvin Warburton and Finlay Rothhaus resigned from the Republican Party and joined the Libertarian Party. Neither ran for re-election.

In 2011, Rhode Island House member Daniel P. Gordon was expelled from the Republican Party and joined the Libertarian Party.

After presidential candidate Donald Trump won Indiana's 2016 Republican primary, several Republican officeholders left the Party and changed their affiliation to the Libertarian Party. In January 2016, the first to switch to the Libertarian Party was Nevada Assembly member John Moore. Moore was censured by the Libertarian Party after he supported of taxpayer subsidies to build a stadium. Moore was defeated for re-election in 2016. In May 2016, nonpartisan Nebraska Legislature member Laura Ebke announced her displeasure with the Republican Party and announced she was registering as a Libertarian. Ebke ran for re-election and lost. In July, Utah State Senate member Mark B. Madsen switched to Libertarian. In the 2016 election cycle, Madsen did not seek re-election. In May 2016, New Hampshire House member Max Abramson switched from Republican to Libertarian before running as the party's gubernatorial candidate instead of seeking re-election.

From February to June 2017, three New Hampshire House members left the Republican or Democratic party and joined the Libertarian Party. Caleb Q. Dyer switched from Republican to Libertarian in February 2017, Joseph Stallcop from Democratic in May 2017, and Brandon Phinney from Republican in June 2017. The 2016 and 2017 defection waves each brought the Libertarian Party to its highest number of state legislature officials since 1992.

In January 2018, New Mexico Commissioner of Public Lands Aubrey Dunn Jr. switched his party registration from Republican to Libertarian and subsequently announced he would run as the Libertarian nominee for the Senate election in New Mexico. Dunn was the first Libertarian in a partisan statewide office.

In April 2020, Representative Justin Amash of Michigan, who was first elected as a Republican, became the first and only Libertarian member of Congress after changing his party affiliation first to Independent, then to Libertarian. After choosing not to seek re-election, Amash joined the Libertarian Party in 2020 and left the US House of Representatives in 2021. In June 2020, Amash, with Ayanna Pressley of the Democratic Party, introduced the Ending Qualified Immunity Act in response to the murder of George Floyd by a Minneapolis police officer. The bill was the first to gain support of members from the Democratic, Republican and Libertarian parties in the history of the United States Congress.

In December 2020, Maine House of Representatives member John Andrews changed his party registration to Libertarian after winning re-election as a Republican.

Several politicians joined the Libertarian Party, sometimes only briefly, after having left office, including former New Mexico Governor Gary Johnson, former Massachusetts Governor William Weld, former Rhode Island Governor Lincoln Chafee, former Alaska United States Senator Mike Gravel, former Georgia Congressman Bob Barr, and former Texas Congressman Ron Paul.

Name	Office	Elected party	Election date	Switch date	End of term
Jarrod Sammis	Vermont State Representative	Republican	November 2022	April 28, 2023	January 8, 2025
John Andrews	Maine State Representative	Republican	November 2020	December 14, 2020	December 7, 2022
Justin Amash	Michigan US Congressman (MI-3)	Republican	November 2010	April 28, 2020	January 3, 2021
Max Abramson	New Hampshire State Representative	Republican	November 2018	June 28, 2019	December 7, 2022
Aubrey Dunn Jr.	New Mexico Commissioner of Public Lands	Republican	November 2014	January 27, 2018	January 1, 2019
Brandon Phinney	New Hampshire State Representative	Republican	November 2016	June 27, 2017	December 5, 2018
Joseph Stallcop	New Hampshire State Representative	Democrat	November 2016	May 10, 2017	August 6, 2018
Caleb Dyer	New Hampshire State Representative	Republican	November 2016	February 9, 2017	December 5, 2018
Mark Madsen	Utah State Senator	Republican	November 2005	July 28, 2016	January 1, 2017
Laura Ebke	Nebraska State Senator	Republican	November 2014	May 12, 2016	January 9, 2019
Max Abramson	New Hampshire State Representative	Republican	November 2014	May 7, 2016	December 7, 2016
John Moore	Nevada State Representative	Republican	November 2014	January 8, 2016	November 9, 2016
Daniel P. Gordon	Rhode Island State Representative	Republican	November 2010	September 2011	January 4, 2013
Finlay Rothhaus	New Hampshire State Representative	Republican	November 1990	December 12, 1991	December 7, 1992
Calvin Warburton	New Hampshire State Representative	Republican	November 1990	July 16, 1991	December 7, 1992

== Election results ==
=== Best major race results ===
Bold indicates race where Libertarian candidate was elected to office

Office	Percent	District	Year	Candidate
President	11.7%	Alaska	1980	Ed Clark
President	9.3%	New Mexico	2016	Gary Johnson
President	6.2%	North Dakota	2016	Gary Johnson
President	3.3%	United States	2016	Gary Johnson
US Senate	33.5%	Arkansas	2020	Ricky Dale Harrington Jr.
US Senate	29.2%	Alaska	2016	Joe Miller
US Senate	18.4%	Massachusetts	2002	Michael Cloud
US House	31.6%	Kansas District 3	2012	Joel Balam
US House	30.7%	Texas District 26	2022	Mike Kolls
US House	28.8%	Mississippi District 2	1998	William Chipman
Governor	14.9%	Alaska	1982	Dick Randolph
Governor	11.4%	Indiana	2020	Donald Rainwater
Governor	10.5%	Wisconsin	2002	Ed Thompson
Other statewide	43.1%	Montana Clerk Of The Supreme Court	2012	Mike Fellows
Other statewide	36.1%	Arkansas Lieutenant Governor	2026	Michael Kalagias
Other statewide	35.9%	Arkansas Commissioner of State Lands	2026	Christopher Olson
State Senate	44.4%	Nevada District 2	1992	Tamara Clark
State Senate	43.6%	Nebraska District 32	2018	Laura Ebke
State Senate	38.7%	West Virginia District 16	2026	Travis Bost
State Representative	**53.6%**	Wyoming District 39	2020	**Marshall Burt**
State Representative	49.4%	Wyoming District 55	2020	Bethany Baldes
State Representative	49.0%	Wyoming District 55	2018	Bethany Baldes

=== Presidential elections ===
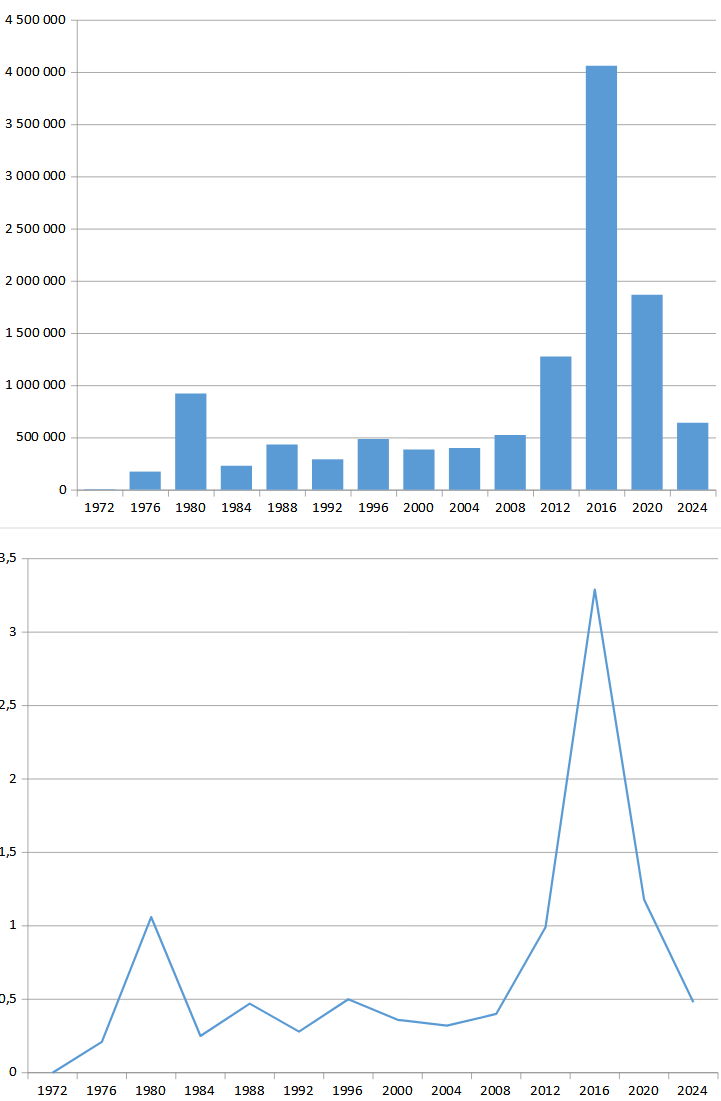
Presidential election results for all Libertarian Party candidates

The first Libertarian presidential candidate, John Hospers, received one electoral vote in 1972 when Roger MacBride, a Virginia Republican faithless elector pledged to Richard Nixon, cast his ballot for the Libertarian ticket. His vote for Theodora ("Tonie") Nathan as vice president was the first electoral college vote ever to be cast for a woman in a United States presidential election. MacBride became the Libertarian presidential nominee himself in 1976. This was the last time that the Libertarian Party won an electoral vote until 44 years later, in the 2016 presidential election, when Texas Republican faithless elector Bill Greene, who was pledged to cast his vote for Donald Trump, instead cast his vote for former Libertarian presidential nominee, and former Republican representative Ron Paul for president.

During the 2016 presidential election, Gary Johnson and vice presidential candidate Bill Weld received a record percentage of 3.3% of the popular vote (4,489,233 votes), getting 9.3% in New Mexico, where Johnson had previously been elected governor. In the 2012 presidential election, Johnson and running mate Jim Gray received 1,275,821 votes (1.0%).

US Presidency
Year	Nominee	Running-mate	# votes	% votes (Nationally)	% votes (Where Balloted)	Electoral votes	Place	Performance Map (Note: Shades are by degrees of (1%).)
1972	John Hospers	Tonie Nathan	3,674	0.00 / 100 (Note: Of 77,744,030 votes)	0.03 / 100 (Note: Of 14,084,428 votes)	1 / 538 (Note: A Virginia faithless elector, Roger MacBride, though pledged to vote for Richard Nixon and Spiro Agnew, instead voted for Libertarian candidates John Hospers and Theodora "Tonie" Nathan.)	11th (Note: By popular vote; 3rd by electoral vote.)	
1976	Roger MacBride	David Bergland	172,557	0.21 / 100 (Note: Of 81,531,584 votes)	0.27 / 100 (Note: Of 64,913,677 votes)	0 / 538	4th	
1980	Ed Clark	David Koch	921,128	1.06 / 100 (Note: Of 86,509,678 votes)		0 / 538	4th	
1984	David Bergland	James A. Lewis	228,111	0.25 / 100 (Note: Of 92,653,233 votes)	0.31 / 100 (Note: Of 74,756,162 votes)	0 / 538	3rd	
1988	Ron Paul	Andre Marrou	431,750	0.47 / 100 (Note: Of 91,594,686 votes)	0.50 / 100 (Note: Of 86,679,526 votes)	0 / 538	3rd	
1992	Andre Marrou	Nancy Lord	290,087	0.28 / 100 (Note: Of 104,423,923 votes)		0 / 538	4th	
1996	Harry Browne	Jo Jorgensen	485,798	0.50 / 100 (Note: Of 96,277,223 votes)		0 / 538	5th	
2000	Harry Browne	Art Olivier	384,431	0.36 / 100 (Note: Of 105,405,100 votes)	0.37 / 100 (Note: Of 103,873,084 votes)	0 / 538	5th	
2004	Michael Badnarik	Richard Campagna	397,265	0.32 / 100 (Note: Of 122,290,630 votes)	0.37 / 100 (Note: Of 120,826,872 votes)	0 / 538	4th	
2008	Bob Barr	Wayne Allyn Root	523,715	0.40 / 100 (Note: Of 131,313,820 votes)	0.37 / 100 (Note: Of 125,264,297 votes)	0 / 538	4th	
2012	Gary Johnson	Jim Gray	1,275,971	0.99 / 100 (Note: Of 129,085,410 votes)	1.00 / 100 (Note: Of 127,750,538 votes)	0 / 538	3rd	
2016	Gary Johnson	Bill Weld	4,489,341	3.28 / 100 (Note: Of 136,669,276 votes)		0 / 538	3rd	
2020	Jo Jorgensen	Spike Cohen	1,865,535	1.18 / 100 (Note: Of 158,429,631 votes)		0 / 538	3rd	
2024	Chase Oliver	Mike ter Maat	650,126	0.42 / 100 (Note: Of 155,238,302 votes)	0.43 / 100 (Note: Of 151,848,491 votes)	0 / 538	5th	

== Internal debates ==
As of 2024, notable caucuses within the party include the Mises Caucus (paleolibertarians), the Classical Liberal Caucus (classical liberals), and the Radical Caucus (anarcho-capitalists).

=== Anarchist-minarchist debate ===
A longstanding debate within the party is one referred to by libertarians as the anarchist–minarchist debate. In 1974, anarchists and minarchists within the party agreed to officially take no position on whether or not government should exist at all and to not advocate either particular view. This agreement has become known as the Dallas Accord, having taken place at the party's convention that year in Dallas, Texas.

Libertarian members often cite the departure of Ed Crane (of the Cato Institute, a libertarian think tank) as a key turning point in the early party history. Crane (who in the 1970s had been the party's first executive director) and some of his allies resigned from the party in 1983 when their preferred candidates for national committee seats lost in the elections at the national convention. Others like Mary Ruwart say that despite this apparent victory of those favoring radicalism, the party has for decades been slowly moving away from those ideals.

In the mid-2000s, groups such as the Libertarian Party Reform Caucus generally advocated revising the party's platform, eliminating or altering the membership statement and focusing on a politics-oriented approach aimed at presenting libertarianism to voters in what they deemed a "less threatening" manner. LPRadicals emerged in response and was active at the 2008 and 2010 Libertarian National Conventions. In its most recent incarnation, the Libertarian Party Radical Caucus was founded with the stated goal to "support the re-radicalization of the LP."

At the 2016 Libertarian National Convention, the Radical Caucus endorsed Darryl W. Perry for President and Will Coley for Vice President, who respectively won 7% and 10% of the vote on the first ballot, both taking fourth place. Though not explicitly organized as such, most self-identified pragmatists or moderates supported the nomination of Gary Johnson for president and Bill Weld for vice president. Johnson and Weld were both nominated on the second ballot with a narrow majority after having both placed just shy of the required 50% on the first ballots. After the convention, the Libertarian Pragmatist Caucus (LPC) was founded and organized with the goal "[t]o promote realistic, pragmatic, and practical libertarian candidates and solutions." LPC supported Nicholas Sarwark in his successful bid for re-election as chair of the party's national committee at the 2018 convention in New Orleans.

=== Free State Project versus Mises Caucus ===
Proponents of the Free State Project, a movement dedicated to concentrating libertarians in the state of New Hampshire, argue that the Libertarian Party strategy of a national victory has been proven ineffective in stark contrast to libertarian concentration and focus on local races in New Hampshire. The founder of the Free State movement, Jason Sorens, stated in the movement's announcement, "Partisan politics has clearly failed: Libertarian presidential candidates consistently fail to break the one per cent barrier, while no Libertarian candidate has ever won election to a federal office."

At Porcfest 2021, an annual libertarian festival held in New Hampshire, Executive Director of the Free State Project (Jeremy Kauffman) and chair of the Libertarian Party (Angela McArdle) debated which strategy is more effective. Kauffman argued that, "There are more people in this room that are elected members to the NH House of Representatives and former members of the Libertarian Party than there are Libertarian Party members nationwide." Meanwhile, Angela McArdle argued that while she wants to see the Free State Project succeed, she argues that the Free State Project could not have existed without the political infrastructure provided by the LP developed over the course of five decades.

== State and territorial parties ==
=== Current affiliates ===
- Libertarian Party of Alabama
- Libertarian Party of Alaska
- Libertarian Party of Arizona
- Libertarian Party of Arkansas
- Libertarian Party of California
- Libertarian Party of Colorado
- Libertarian Party of Connecticut
- Libertarian Party of Delaware
- Libertarian Party of Florida
- Libertarian Party of Georgia
- Libertarian Party of Hawaii
- Libertarian Party of Idaho
- Libertarian Party of Illinois
- Libertarian Party of Indiana
- Libertarian Party of Iowa
- Libertarian Party of Kansas
- Libertarian Party of Kentucky
- Libertarian Party of Louisiana
- Libertarian Party of Maine
- Libertarian Party of Maryland
- Unified Libertarians of Massachusetts (Note: The Unified Libertarians are a pro-Mises splinter of the Libertarian Association of Massachusetts, which formed when the former affiliate, the Libertarian Association, separated from the national party to form the Liberal Party USA.)
- Libertarian Party of Michigan
- Libertarian Party of Minnesota
- Libertarian Party of Mississippi
- Libertarian Party of Missouri
- Montana Libertarian Party
- Libertarian Party of Nebraska
- Libertarian Party of Nevada
- Granite State Libertarian Party
- Free New Mexico Party
- Libertarian Party of New Jersey
- Libertarian Party of New York
- Libertarian Party of North Carolina
- Libertarian Party of North Dakota
- Libertarian Party of Ohio
- Libertarian Party of Oklahoma
- Libertarian Party of Oregon
- Libertarian Party of Pennsylvania
- Libertarian Party of Rhode Island
- Libertarian Party of South Carolina
- Libertarian Party of South Dakota
- Libertarian Party of Tennessee
- Libertarian Party of Texas
- Libertarian Party of Utah
- Libertarian Party of Vermont
- Libertarian Party of Virginia
- Libertarian Party of Washington
- Libertarian Party of West Virginia
- Libertarian Party of Wisconsin
- Libertarian Party of Wyoming
- Libertarian Party of the District of Columbia

=== Former affiliates ===
- Libertarian Association of Massachusetts
- Libertarian Party of New Hampshire
- Libertarian Party of New Mexico

== See also ==
- Electoral history of the Libertarian Party (United States)
- Libertarianism in the United States
- List of American libertarians
- List of libertarian organizations
- List of libertarian political parties
- List of Libertarian Party politicians who have held office in the United States
- Political party strength in U.S. states
- Right-libertarianism
- Third party (U.S. politics)
