= Libertarian Party of Rhode Island =

- Abbreviation: LPRI
- Chairperson: William Hunt
- Secretary: Theresa Markey
- Founded: 1977
- Ideology: Libertarianism; Non-interventionism; Fiscal conservatism Economic liberalism Cultural liberalism Laissez-faire

Website
- lpri.us

The Libertarian Party of Rhode Island is the state affiliate of the Libertarian Party in Rhode Island.

== History ==
The first Libertarian to run for state-wide office was Stewart L. Engel in his candidacy for Governor in 1976. The next year the Rhode Island affiliate to the national Libertarian Party was formed. It shares the same platform as the national party formed in 1971.

By 2005 the executive committee was no longer meeting, but the party was revived on October 17th 2010 by chairman Christian Chirino and vice-chairman Brian Stack.

In 2014 the party ran Tony Jones for Lieutenant Governor. While they had fielded candidates for federal, state, and local offices since 1976, this was their first state-wide office in that time.

In 2020 William J. "Billy" Hunt Jr. received over 40% of the vote for State House. He had run in 2016, 2018, and 2019, receiving 38.28%, 35.3%, and 28.4% respectively. He went on to be elected as Chairman of the LPRI Executive Committee on May 23rd 2021.

In 2022 the party ran Elijah Gizzarelli for Governor. Former chairman Pat Ford reported volunteers from Rhode Island and Massachusetts working for nine days straight in 90-degree-plus weather to get him on the ballot, and that if even a single volunteer had not helped the measures would have failed.

== Leadership ==
Executive Committee:

- Chair: William J. "Billy" Hunt, Jr.
- Treasurer: Larry Davis
- Secretary: Theresa Markey
- At-Large: Thomas Markey

== See also ==
- List of state Libertarian Parties in the United States
