= Libertarian Party of Iowa =

State affiliate of the Libertarian Party

- Chairperson: Jules Cutler
- Senate leader: None
- House leader: None
- Founded: April 19, 1975
- Ideology: Libertarianism
- National affiliation: Libertarian Party (United States)
- Colors: a shade of Blue; Yellow
- U.S. Senate: 0 / 2
- U.S. House: 0 / 4
- Statewide Executive Offices: 0 / 7
- State Senate: 0 / 50
- State House: 0 / 100
- Other elected officials: 3 (June 2024)

Website
- www.lpia.org

The Libertarian Party of Iowa is the Iowa affiliate of the Libertarian Party. It gained major party status in 2017, following Gary Johnson's performance in the 2016 presidential election in Iowa. As of 2018, there are 11,300 registered Libertarians in the state.

== History ==
The party was originally established on April 19, 1975, dissolved in 1985, and re-established with new organization on April 26, 1987.

The party's first nomination for President was Roger MacBride and David Bergland in 1976.

In 1980 Ed Clark and running mate David Koch became the state party's first nominee for President, to break 1%, receiving 921,128 votes (1.06%).

Registration for voters as Libertarian began in 2008.

In 2017 Gary Johnson, who would go on to become the national party's nominee for President, cleared the 2% benchmark, receiving 3.8% of the vote. This allowed the party to achieve official party status the following year.

2018 saw the first Libertarian to win a partisan election in Iowa when Thomas Laehn was elected as County Attorney of Greene County. He was re-elected in 2022, and is now running for U.S. Senate.

On January 15th 2024 the Libertarian Party of Iowa held its first caucus as a major party, nominating Chase Oliver in a straw poll. Participants became ineligible for the Republican caucus the same day or for Democratic mail-in ballots.

== Vote totals for Libertarian candidates in Iowa ==
=== U.S. President ===
Year	Candidate	Votes	Percentage
1976	Roger MacBride	1,454	0.1%
1980	Ed Clark	13,123	1.0%
1984	David Bergland	1,844	0.1%
1988	Ron Paul	2,494	0.2%
1992	Andre Marrou	1,076	0.1%
1996	Harry Browne	2,315	0.2%
2000	Harry Browne	3,209	0.2%
2004	Michael Badnarik	2,992	0.2%
2008	Bob Barr	4,590	0.3%
2012	Gary Johnson	12,926	0.8%
2016	Gary Johnson	59,186	3.8%
2020	Jo Jorgensen	19,637	1.2%

=== 2020 U.S. Presidential Caucus Straw Poll ===
Candidates	Total Votes	Percentage
Jacob Hornberger	133	47.3%
Lincoln Chafee	36	12.8%
Jo Jorgensen	18	6.4%
Adam Kokesh	17	6.1%
Daniel Behrman	14	5.0%
John McAfee	10	3.6%
Vermin Supreme	9	3.2%
None of the Above	8	2.9%
Write In	8	2.9%
Sam Robb	7	2.5%
Max Abramson	6	2.1%
Mark Whitney	4	1.4%
Arvin Vohra	3	1.1%
Keenan Dunham	2	0.7%
Ken Armstrong	2	0.7%
Souraya Faas	2	0.7%
Benjamin Leder	1	0.4%
John Monds	1	0.4%
Grand Total	281	100%

== See also ==
- Richard Campagna
- List of state parties of the Libertarian Party (United States)
- Political party strength in Iowa
