= Libertarian Party of Tennessee =

State affiliate of the Libertarian Party

- Chairperson: Josiah Baker
- Founded: 1971
- Ideology: Libertarianism
- National affiliation: Libertarian Party (United States)
- Colors: a shade of Gray; Yellow
- Tennessee Senate: 0 / 33
- Tennessee House of Representatives: 0 / 99
- U.S. Senate (Tennessee): 0 / 2
- U.S. House of Representatives (Tennessee): 0 / 9
- Other elected officials: 2 (June 2024)

Website
- www.lptn.org

The Libertarian Party of Tennessee (LPTN) is a political party in the United States that operates in the state of Tennessee. It is a recognized affiliate of the national Libertarian Party of the United States. On September 20, 2010, the party gained the legal right to ballot access after a restrictive Tennessee law was struck down in the case Libertarian Party of Tennessee v. Goins. The party's annual convention is held in Murfreesboro, Tennessee.

== History ==
=== 2024 ===
Following the 2024 Libertarian National Convention and the subsequent naming of Chase Oliver and Mike ter Maat to be the libertarian nominees, the Libertarian Party of Tennessee protested, stating that Oliver was too divisive within the party, and opposed to Libertarian orthodoxy, with state chairman Josiah Baker announcing that the Tennessee party would nominate an alternate ticket of Clint Russell and Josie Glabach.

=== Ballot access ===
In a joint lawsuit filed on January 23, 2008, by the Libertarian, Green and Constitution Parties of Tennessee against the State of Tennessee, a 1972 state law that limited state ballot access was challenged and overturned. The law had required a petition with signatures amounting to 2.5% of the most recent gubernatorial votes be submitted to the State Board of Elections 120 days before the election in which parties wished to have their party listed on the state ballot. Prior to the lawsuit, the LPTN had never applied for ballot access in Tennessee, though the Populist Party, the Reform Party, the Constitution Party and the Green Party had unsuccessfully applied.

In the September 20, 2010 ruling, U.S. District Court Judge William Joseph Haynes struck down the petition deadline, the precise wording of the petition requirements and the volume of signatures required.

== Current leadership ==
- Josiah Baker, Chair
- Chris Darnell, Vice Chair
- Keith McQuarrie, Secretary
- Zachary Houk, Treasurer

== Elected officials ==
- Joshua Beal -- Montgomery County Commissioner
- Erika Ebel -- Smith County Commissioner
- Cole Ebel -- Carthage City Council
- Stephen Chambers -- Trousdale County Mayor

== College Libertarian Chapters ==
College Libertarians of UT-Martin (University of Tennessee – Martin)

== Notable Tennessee Libertarians ==
- Harry Browne
- Mary Phelps
- John McAfee

== See also ==
- Libertarian Party of the United States
- List of state parties of the Libertarian Party (United States)
- Tennessee Republican Party
- Tennessee Democratic Party
- Political party strength in Tennessee
- Campaign for Liberty
