= Libertarian Party of Alabama =

State affiliate of the Libertarian Party

- Abbreviation: LPA
- Chairperson: Samuel Bohler
- Founded: 1976; 50 years ago
- Headquarters: P.O. Box 2375, Madison, AL 35758
- Ideology: Libertarianism
- Alabama Senate: 0 / 35
- Alabama House of Representatives: 0 / 105
- U.S. Senate (Alabama): 0 / 2
- U.S. House of Representatives (Alabama): 0 / 7
- Other elected officials: 0 (June 2024)

Website
- lpalabama.org

The Libertarian Party of Alabama (LPA) is the Alabama affiliate of the national Libertarian Party (LP). It is headquartered in Huntsville, Alabama. Due to the high signature requirement to get onto the ballot and the requirement that a party run a statewide candidate that receives at least 20% in order to maintain ballot access the Libertarian Party of Alabama has rarely fielded candidates.

== History ==
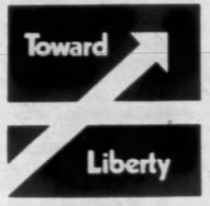
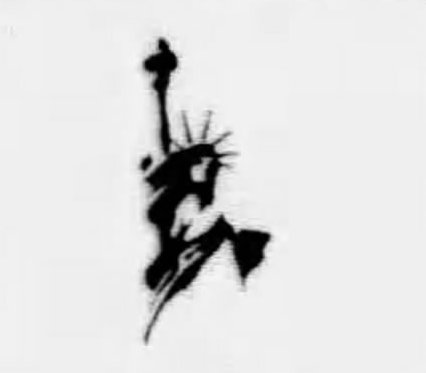
Symbols previously used by the Libertarian Party of Alabama.

In 1976, the party began its first ballot access drive when it sent 50 volunteers to collect over 5,000 signatures from registered voters in order for its presidential candidate to appear on the ballot. In March the party sent over 5,000 signatures to the Secretary of State and it was later accepted giving Roger MacBride ballot access in Alabama.

In 1981, Steve Smith, the party coordinator, proposed at a meeting on election law reform that none of these candidates should be added to Alabama ballots; the proposal was rejected. On June 19, 1982, the party held its state convention in Montgomery, which was attended by the party's 1980 presidential candidate Ed Clark and 25 people, to nominate candidates and to discuss a new state ballot access law that would require third-party candidates to collect a certain percentage of voters rather than a set amount.

In 1983, multiple Libertarian candidates were denied ballot access due to the new requirements set by the ballot access law which increased the amount needed to gain ballot access from either receiving 10% in the previous general election to 20% or by collecting signatures from registered voters equal to the 1% of votes in the previous general election. The party made legal appeals to gain ballot access stating that they had gained ballot access under the previous law and that the current law could not be applied during the current election cycle; however, their appeals were rejected.

In 1991, former Governor Fob James addressed the party's state convention. Nancy Lord, the party's vice presidential nominee, and Larry Pratt, president of the Gun Owners of America, both spoke at the 1992 state convention.

In 2000, after collecting over 60,000 signatures, the Libertarian Party of Alabama ran a small slate of candidates. Libertarian Candidate Sydney Al Smith garnered over 20% in a statewide race and in 2002, the Libertarian Party of Alabama was the first minor party to have achieved major party status in Alabama in over 30 years. In the next election cycle the Libertarian Party of Alabama ran 58 candidates ranging from governor to tax collector. Unable to garner over 20% in a statewide race, the Libertarian Party of Alabama lost its major party status and associated ballot access after 2002.

Since 2002, the Libertarian Party of Alabama has not been able to collect the nearly 60,000 raw signatures that would be required to regain statewide ballot access, but have been able to get ballot access for their presidential candidates as independents.

The party led efforts to defeat Amendment One, the tax increase plan proposed by Republican Governor Bob Riley. Alabama Libertarians were credited by talk radio host Russ Fine as "the leader in Internet activism" for their efforts in directing an online campaign against the tax plan. The Libertarian Party of Alabama hosted a meeting in Birmingham, Alabama between many of the key people and organizations opposing the ballot measure. Key personalities from the Tennessee Tax Revolt, Inc. shared their experiences from recent tax battles in the neighboring state. In attendance were representatives from the Eagle Forum, talk radio programs, Citizens for a Sound Economy, the Libertarian Party and local businessman Stan Pate. The primary result of this meeting was a coordinated coalition activity geared toward defeating the ballot measure. While the Alabama Republican Party eventually offered a weak disapproval of Riley's tax plan, the Libertarian Party of Alabama was the only political party to offer active resistance to the proposed tax hike. The measure was rejected by voters on September 9, 2003, with 68 percent opposed to it.

After gathering over 8,000 petitions, the party was granted ballot access in Jefferson County, the most populated county in Alabama. Currently the LPA is seeking candidates for this county and collecting signatures for surrounding counties.

In 2019, the party filed a lawsuit against Secretary of State John Merrill for charging them $34,000 for a voter list while the Republican and Democratic parties are given the same list for free and on August 28 District Court Judge Emily C. Marks refused the state's request to dismiss the case.

In 2022, after 20 years of attempting to regain state-wide ballot access, the party succeeded. They proceeded to field 64 candidates in that election.

A split in the party occurred in 2025, with former state organizer for the Mises Caucus, Mike Shaner forming the "Voluntaryist Party of Alabama". Shaner stated that Alabama is an “authoritarian nightmare” and the Libertarian Party is "no longer capable of challenging the state’s political establishment."

== Former officials ==
- Jimmy Blake – Birmingham City councilor (1993–2001)

== Electoral performance ==
=== Presidential ===
Year	Presidential nominee	Votes	Change
1976	Roger MacBride	1,481 (0.1%)	Steady
1980	Ed Clark	13,318 (1.0%)	▲0.9%
1984	David Bergland	9,504 (0.7%)	▼0.3%
1988	Ron Paul	8,460 (0.6%)	▼0.1%
1992	Andre Marrou	5,737 (0.3%)	▼0.2%
1996	Harry Browne	5,290 (0.3%)	Steady
2000	Harry Browne	5,893 (0.4%)	▲0.1%
2004	Michael Badnarik	3,529 (0.2%)	▼0.2%
2008	Bob Barr	4,991 (0.2%)	▲0.1%
2012	Gary Johnson	12,328 (0.6%)	▲0.4%
2016	Gary Johnson	44,467 (2.1%)	▲1.5%
2020	Jo Jorgensen	25,176 (1.1%)	▼1.0%
2024	Chase Oliver	4,930 (0.22%)	▼0.86%

== See also ==
- Political party strength in Alabama
- List of state parties of the Libertarian Party
