= Civil libertarianism =

Strain of political thought

Civil libertarianism or cultural libertarianism is a strain of political thought that supports civil liberties and rights, or which emphasizes the supremacy of individual rights and personal freedoms over and against any kind of authority (such as a state, a corporation, social norms imposed through peer pressure and so on). It does not refer to economic policy or other aspects of governance typically discussed by libertarians.

== In the libertarian movement ==
In the domain of libertarian philosophy, the primary concern of civil libertarians is the relationship between government and individuals. In theory, civil libertarians seek to restrict this relationship to an absolute minimum in which the state can function and provide basic services and securities without excessively interfering in the lives of its citizens. One key cause of civil libertarianism is upholding free speech. Specifically, civil libertarians oppose bans on hate speech and obscenity.

Civil libertarianism specifically refers to civil issues and personal freedoms. A civil libertarian may not hold traditional libertarian beliefs regarding economy, corporate regulation, housing management, or other aspects of governance. Although they may or may not personally condone behaviors associated with these issues, civil libertarians hold that the advantages of unfettered public discourse outweigh any disadvantages, and that the coercion of speech is inherently wrong.

== See also ==
- Civil and political rights
- Cultural liberalism
- Libertarianism in the United States
- Liberty
- Left-libertarianism
- Right-libertarianism
