= Libertarian Party of Maryland =

Maryland State affiliate of the Libertarian Party

- Chairperson: Kyle O'Donnell
- Senate leader: None
- House leader: None
- Founded: 1971
- Ideology: Libertarianism
- National affiliation: Libertarian Party (United States)
- Colors: a shade of Blue; Yellow
- Maryland Senate: 0 / 47
- Maryland House of Representatives: 0 / 141
- U.S. Senate (Maryland): 0 / 2
- U.S. House of Representatives (Maryland): 0 / 8
- Other elected officials: 0 (June 2024)

Website
- LPMaryland.org

The Libertarian Party of Maryland is the Maryland affiliate of the Libertarian Party. The state chair is Kyle O'Donnell. The party, also known as "LPMaryland," or "LPMD" is Maryland's third-largest political party, with 17,364 registered voters across the state as of August 31, 2022. According to its website, the party "speaks to the proper relationship between the state and the individual; it does not speak to what individuals ought to do morally. The state exists to protect it's [sic] residents and their property from those that would harm." LPMaryland also forms coalitions with other civic organizations who share at least some common ground with libertarians, including groups that concern themselves primarily with civil liberties, world peace, fiscal restraint, and government reform. The official views of the party on state-level policy issues are set forth in the Libertarian Party of Maryland Platform.

== History ==
=== Ballot access ===
From 1971 to 1998 minor parties needed a 10,000-signature petition to qualify for ballot access, then separate petitions for each non-presidential nominee. Nominee petitions required 3% of registered voters in a candidate's district. In 1998 after a lobbying campaign that number was changed from 3% to 1% by legislation. In 2003 the decision of MARYLAND GREEN PARTY v. MARYLAND BOARD OF ELECTIONS held that the second petition requirement for minor-party candidates violated equal protection under Article 24 of the Maryland Declaration of Rights, as the state constitution provides greater protection of ballot access than the U.S. Constitution. These reductions in the difficulty of ballot access were a major focus of Maine Libertarian Doug McNeil.

=== Electoral ===
James Cook is a Libertarian elected to Rock Hall City Council in 2021.

Muir Boda is a Libertarian elected to the Salisbury City Council in 2015.

== Governance ==
The Libertarian Party of Maryland is governed primarily by its Constitution and Bylaws. The Constitution and By-laws entrust all party decision-making to the State Central Committee. Currently, any Maryland resident who is an official party member may become a voting member of the Central Committee as long as they are registered Libertarian and certifies that they agree with the principle that no person (or group of persons) has the right to seek to attain values by initiating the use of force or fraud against any other person (or group of persons). This is one version of the "non-aggression principle," a fundamental principle of liberty and limited government.

Operational management of the party is entrusted to an executive board of the State Central Committee. The board is composed of a chair, vice-chair, treasurer, and secretary, as well as three at-large members. The current membership of the executive board (elected to serve through the 2024 Convention) is as follows:

Chair: Kyle O'Donnell
Vice-Chair: Alex Schlegel
Treasurer: Travis Lerol
Secretary: Anastasia Pyzik
At-Large Members: David Dull, Scott Gearhart, Brian Kunkoski

The Libertarian Party of Maryland is one of three political parties that are recognized by the Maryland State Board of Elections. Its ability to continue nominating candidates for office without qualifying each candidate separately ("ballot access" for short) depends on its ability to demonstrate sufficient popular support for the party every four years by obtaining 1% of the vote in the gubernatorial elections, maintaining 1% of registered voters, or by obtaining 10,000 valid petition signatures.

== 2022 Libertarian Candidates ==
Governor | Lt. Governor: David Lashar and Christiana Logansmith

Wicomico County Executive: Muir Boda

Maryland Senate | District 31: Brian Kunkoski

Maryland Senate | District 43: Bob Gemmill

U.S. Congress | 1st District: Daniel Thibeault

U.S. Congress | 8th District: Kevin Andrés Garcia

House of Delegates | District 1A: Monique M. Mehring

House of Delegates | District 31: Travis Lerol

Anne Arundel County Council | District 2: Dave Sgambellone

Baltimore County Council | District 7: Doug Stanley

Harford County Council | District F: Matthew Whitlock

== See also ==
- 2022 Maryland gubernatorial election
- Libertarian Party
- Maryland elections
- Maryland Senate
- Maryland House of Delegates
- List of state Libertarian Parties in the United States
