= Libertarian Party of Louisiana =

State affiliate of the Libertarian Party

- Chairperson: Keith Thompson
- Senate leader: None
- House leader: None
- Founded: 1973
- Ideology: Libertarianism
- National affiliation: Libertarian Party (United States)
- Colors: a shade of Blue; Yellow
- Louisiana Senate: 0 / 39
- Louisiana House of Representatives: 0 / 105
- U.S. Senate (Louisiana): 0 / 2
- U.S. House of Representatives (Louisiana): 0 / 6
- Other elected officials: 1 (June 2024)

Website
- lplouisiana.org

The Libertarian Party of Louisiana (LPL) is the Louisiana affiliate of the Libertarian Party. The state chair is Heide Alejandro-Smith. It is the third largest party in Louisiana and one of five officially recognized parties in the state. The LPL has two legislative accomplishments to its credit, one a friendlier ballot access law passed in 2004, and the other, a defeat of a bill which would have redefined any party under 40,000 registered voters as a "minor" party and not deserving of federal primary elections. The party is currently organizing individual parishes with their own party committees and is fielding candidates in state and local elections.

== Party success ==
=== Elections ===
The Libertarian Party of Louisiana has had some success in elections. In the 2006 election for Louisiana's 6th Congressional District, Libertarian candidate Richard Fontanesi received just over 17% of the total vote or 19,648 votes. Though he received only 10.5% of the vote, Rufus Holt Craig Jr. currently holds the title of most votes in District 6 with the 32,200 he garnered in November 2012. These were very strong showings for candidates who raised comparatively little money. The largest percentage in a US House race is 24.87% received by Randall Lord in the 4th District in November 2012. He also holds the record for largest vote total in a US House race with 61,586 votes. In 2006 S.B.A. Zaitoon received 11% of the vote in a special election for Insurance Commissioner, garnering 60,182 votes, this is the most for any Louisiana Libertarian candidate in a Statewide race in both percentage and total votes received.

In November 2012, Electors for Gary Johnson for President received 17,975 votes – about 0.92% statewide, which is more than double the number of votes received by Electors for Ed Clark in 1980, and nearly double what Electors for Ron Paul received in 2008.

For State Legislative races, the most votes received was 3,995 by Richard Fontenesi in his 2007 bid for the State Senate, and the largest percentage was 21.9% garnered by William David Chance in his 2011 bid for State House.

In 2012, the LPL achieved its first electoral victories when Randall Todd Hayes filed for the office of Alderman for the Village of Atlanta and Michael Riffe filed for the office of Alderman for the Village os Sykes, both in Winn Parish. For each office, three were to be elected. In Atlanta, only three candidates files, and in Sykes, only two candidates filed, thus all are deemed "elected" and will take office on January 1, 2013. Riffe is an incumbent who recently switched his affiliation to the Libertarian Party. They were the first minor party members elected to public office in Louisiana since 1968.

=== Legislation ===
In 2009, the party was instrumental in defeating Louisiana HB 776, which would have caused Reform, Green and Libertarian Congressional candidates to appear only on the general election ballot no matter how many there were of each, and without the benefit of a party primary. This issue has been rendered moot since the repeal of party primaries to took effect after the November 2010 general election.

=== Establishment of third-party primaries ===
In 2010 the party held its first primary in the state when Anthony “Tony G” Gentile, an oil refinery supervisor from the New Orleans suburb of Mandeville, and Randall Todd Hayes, a stock trader from the small central Louisiana town of Atlanta, both signed up for the U.S. Senate race. This was the state’s first third-party primary in a century.

== Ballot access ==
The LPL is one of five officially recognized parties in Louisiana and as such its members are designated by "LBT" on voter registration cards rather than "other", and its candidates have "Libertarian" printed next to their names on the ballot. Being a recognized party, only filing fees dictated by statute are required to be placed on the ballot; petition signatures are not needed. (though one can always opt to turn in signatures in lieu of filing fees)

Louisiana has one of the most liberal ballot access laws in the nation, due in no small part to efforts by the LPL in 2004. The LPL approached independent members of the state legislature and urged them to support legislation that would formally recognize additional parties and distinguish their candidates on the ballot from other parties and from independents. The measure passed and currently a party can choose two methods of recognition: method A) register 1,000 voters, pay a $1,000 fee, and register with the La. Secretary of State; or B) achieve at least 5% of the total votes in any statewide election. To retain ballot access, a party must maintain at least 1,000 registrants and field a statewide candidate at least once every four years if choosing option A, or repeat the 5% or better vote total if qualifying by method B. The LPL chose method A and has both maintained that status and fielded statewide candidates every year since.

=== Libertarian Party et al. v. Dardenne 2008 ===
Due to problems arising from Hurricane Gustav closing state offices during the 2008 qualifying period and other issues, the LPL did not meet the filing deadline to place Libertarian Party Presidential candidate Bob Barr on the ballot for November. State law at the time, allowed for a 72-hour "grace period" where a national party could secure a ballot line for their candidate, where the state party had failed to do so. The LNC filed their paperwork within 72 hours of the state party missing the deadline, but the Secretary of State, Jay Dardenne refused to add Barr's name to the ballot. Litigation commenced with the first round in U.S. District court going to the LP, however, the Judge agreed to a two-day stay of his order to reprint the ballots pending appeal by the State. Dardenne won the next two rounds at both the fifth circuit and the US Supreme court and so Barr did not appear on the 2008 Louisiana ballot. Notably, neither the Fifth Circuit Appeals Court, nor the Supreme Court addressed the issue of a Secretary of State or a Governor altering the deadlines for qualifying set by the Legislature as a violation of Article 1 of the U.S. Constitution in rendering their decision. Instead, both courts focused on the issue that the LPL failed on its own accord to meet the filing deadline, (which was never disputed) and they both used the circular logic that the State's act of printing the incorrect ballots precipitated a hardship for the State to have to reprint them and that overseas, military, and absentee voters would be needlessly "confused" by receiving a second ballot. Both courts also failed to acknowledge findings from the District court that the State had received the LNC (national party) filing before the "proof" copy of the ballot was returned from the printer for final approval, and that the state could have printed the ballots correctly without this confusion or hardship.

== Party primaries ==
While Louisiana has experimented with closed party primaries in the past, at present, there is no such system. There are Open Primary Elections where all candidates, regardless of how many from each party, are placed on the ballot for each office. This means there can be any number of people from any party, officially recognized or not, as well as independents all vying for the same office. If there is no clear winner after the primary (a majority is needed for single seat offices) then the two candidates receiving the most votes compete alone in the "General Election" which essentially is a runoff election, usually held one month later.

The only closed party "primary" in Louisiana is the Presidential Preference Primary which essentially is a non-binding straw-vote of party member preference for their nominee for President. It is not a true primary for any office in the traditional sense as losers may still end up the nominee, and winners may not. As noted above, at this time, the Libertarian Party of Louisiana does not yet qualify for such a primary.

== Past candidates ==
Caddo- Lauren Ray Anderson, District Attorney 2026

Caddo- Tony T Williams, Justice of the Peace 2026

Concordia- Charles Brown, Alderman 2026

Congress- District 2 Lisa Ballay 2026

Congress- District 6 Rufus Craig 2026

== Membership ==
Party membership as of 2022 is 16,035 registered Libertarians in the State of Louisiana up from January 2017, which was 14,414 registered voters statewide. Party membership continues to increase since official recognition increased knowledge about libertarianism and by those seeking an alternative to older parties presently in power.

To become a member of the Libertarian Party in Louisiana, one simply need register as "Libertarian" on their voter registration form by circling "LBT", or ask their Parish Registrar of Voters to change their party affiliation to "Libertarian." This can now be accomplished online at the Louisiana Secretary of State's website: GeauxVote.com

Those registered Libertarians who also pay annual dues, are automatically registered for the State Convention, can seek party office, and can vote at the convention on party business. The party currently offers the following annual memberships: $25 – Sustaining, $50 – Bronze, $100 – Silver, $250 – Gold, $500 – Liberty, $1,000 – Pelican.

If the party is successful in growing up to 40,000 members, then the State of Louisiana will hold a Presidential Preference primary for the Libertarian Party according to State law. (LA RS 18:1280.21.A) Achieving this goal would also head off future attempts at relegating the LPL to "minor party" status as was attempted in the Spring 2009 legislative session.

== Party organization ==
The Party is organizing on the parish level as required by state law similar to that used by the larger Democrat and Republican parties. This consists of a Parish Executive Committee (PEC) made up of a number of members that equal those on the parish's governing body. (police jury or parish council) If at-large positions are not already available on the governing body, then each parish can have up to two such positions. From among themselves, the Committee selects a Parish Chair, Secretary, Treasurer, Membership Officer, Elections Officer, and Campus Coordinator. These officers are chosen every four years by caucus of party members in the parish. (state run elections will be used if the party has more than 5% of the registered voters in the state, which is approximately 144,000 voters as of June 2012.)

The PEC's are the primary organizational unit of the LPL and are responsible for membership, fund raising, electioneering and public outreach within their parish. They are also responsible for implementing and overseeing the Government Liaison program of the LPL. In addition, only organized parishes control the selection of delegates to the Libertarian National Convention.

As of July 2022, there are 12 organized parish affiliates listed by order of registered Libertarians.

1. East Baton Rouge 1,689
2. Jefferson 1,603
3. Orleans 1,534
4. St. Tammany 1,518
5. Lafayette 1,101
6. Caddo 809
7. Calcasieu 750
8. Livingston 696
9. Ascension 596
10. Tangipahoa 470
11. Rapides 410
12. St. Mary 130

Parishes in the process of being organized:

1. Bossier 505
2. Vermillion 138
3. St. Martin 109

The LPL is governed by a State Central Committee which serves as the party's Board of Directors. This committee is chosen every two years at a State Convention. Its members include: Party Chair, Vice-Chair, Secretary, Treasurer, Membership Officer, Communications Officer, and Elections Officer. (larger parties in Louisiana must elect State Central Committees based on State House districts). In addition to the Executive officers, congressional district representatives and organized parishes hold a seat on the State Central Committee.

== Officers and Committee Chair ==
- Chair – Keith Thompson
- Vice-Chair – Tyler Barganquast
- Secretary – Christian Facundus
- Treasurer – Sherri Spitale
- Membership Officer – Brett Robelz
- Elections Officer – Donald Dunn
- Communications Officer – Christian Horner
- Bylaws Committee Chair - Tyler Bargenquast

=== District SCC Representatives ===
- District 1 – Joe Little
- District 2 – Boyd Smith
- District 3 – Michael Graves
- District 4 – Tyler Bargenquast
- District 5 – Rufus Craig
- District 6 – Pennie Landry

=== Parish SCC Representatives ===
- Ascension – Colin Nicol
- Caddo – Tony T Williams
- Calcasieu – Ali Pomponio
- East Baton Rouge – Jordan Gallo
- Jefferson – Scott Waguespack
- Lafayette – Craig Forest
- Livingston – Kevin Pilley
- Orleans – Stephanie Dreher
- Rapides – Susan Thompson
- St. Mary – Jaden Breaux
- St Tammany – Ron Denenea
- Tangipahoa – Joe Little

== Platform ==
Adopted in convention April 7, 2018:

Preamble

As Libertarians, we seek a world of liberty; a world in which all individuals are sovereign over their own lives and no one is forced to sacrifice his or her values for the benefit of others.

We believe that respect for individual rights is the essential precondition for a free and prosperous world, that force and fraud must be banished from human relationships, and that only through freedom can peace and prosperity be realized.

Consequently, we defend each person’s right to engage in any activity that is peaceful and honest, and welcome the diversity that freedom brings. The world we seek to build is one where individuals are free to follow their own dreams in their own ways, without interference from government or any authoritarian power.

In the following pages we have set forth our basic principles and enumerated various policy stands derived from those principles.

These specific policies are not our goal, however. Our goal is nothing more nor less than a world set free in our lifetime, and it is to this end that we take these stands.

Statement of Principles

We, the members of the Libertarian Party of Louisiana, challenge the cult of the omnipotent state and defend the rights of the individual.

We hold that all individuals have the right to exercise sole dominion over their own lives, and have the right to live in whatever manner they choose, so long as they do not forcibly interfere with the equal right of others to live in whatever manner they choose.

Governments throughout history have regularly operated on the opposite principle, that the State has the right to dispose of the lives of individuals and the fruits of their labor. Even within the United States, all political parties other than our own grant to government the right to regulate the lives of individuals and seize the fruits of their labor without their consent.

We, on the contrary, deny the right of any government to do these things, and hold that where governments exist, they must not violate the rights of any individual: namely, (1) the right to life—accordingly we support the prohibition of the initiation of physical force against others; (2) the right to liberty of speech and action—accordingly we oppose all attempts by government to abridge the freedom of speech and press, as well as government censorship in any form; and (3) the right to property—accordingly we oppose all government interference with private property, such as confiscation, nationalization, and eminent domain, and support the prohibition of robbery, trespass, fraud, and misrepresentation.

Since governments, when instituted, must not violate individual rights, we oppose all interference by government in the areas of voluntary and contractual relations among individuals. People should not be forced to sacrifice their lives and property for the benefit of others. They should be left free by government to deal with one another as free traders; and the resultant economic system, the only one compatible with the protection of individual rights, is the free market.

1.0 Personal Liberty

Individuals should be free to make choices for themselves and must accept responsibility for the consequences of the choices they make. Our support of an individual's right to make choices in life does not mean that we necessarily approve or disapprove of those choices. No individual, group, or government may initiate force against any other individual, group, or government.

1.1 Self-Ownership

Individuals own their bodies and have rights over them that other individuals, groups, and governments may not violate. Individuals have the freedom and responsibility to decide what they knowingly and voluntarily consume, and what risks they accept to their own health, finances, safety, or life.

1.2 Expression and Communication

We support full freedom of expression and oppose government censorship, regulation or control of communications media and technology. We favor the freedom to engage in or abstain from any religious activities that do not violate the rights of others. We oppose government actions which either aid or attack any religion.

1.3 Privacy

Libertarians advocate individual privacy and government transparency. We are committed to ending government's practice of spying on everyone. We support the rights recognized by the Fourth Amendment to be secure in our persons, homes, property, and communications. Protection from unreasonable search and seizure should include records held by third parties, such as email, medical, and library records.

1.4 Personal Relationships

Sexual orientation, preference, gender, or gender identity should have no impact on the government's treatment of individuals, such as in current marriage, child custody, adoption, immigration or military service laws. Government does not have the authority to define, license or restrict personal relationships. Consenting adults should be free to choose their own sexual practices and personal relationships.

1.5 Abortion

Recognizing that abortion is a sensitive issue and that people can hold good-faith views on all sides, we believe that government should be kept out of the matter, leaving the question to each person for their conscientious consideration.

We do not support tax funding of abortion providers. It is particularly harsh to force someone who believes that abortion is murder to pay for another's abortion.

1.6 Parental Rights

Parents, or other guardians, have the right to raise their children according to their own standards and beliefs. We call for the privatization of the foster system. This statement shall not be construed to condone child abuse or neglect.

1.7 Crime and Justice

The prescribed role of government is to protect the rights of every individual including the right to life, liberty and property.

Criminal laws should be limited in their application to violations of the rights of others through force or fraud, or to deliberate actions that place others involuntarily at significant risk of harm. Therefore, we call for the repeal of all victimless crime laws, such as the use of drugs for medicinal or recreational purposes, and call for the immediate release of these persons and the expungement of arrest records created by such crimes.

We support restitution to the victim to the fullest degree possible at the expense of the criminal or the negligent wrongdoer. The constitutional rights of the criminally accused, including due process, a speedy trial, legal counsel, trial by jury, and the legal presumption of innocence until proven guilty, must be preserved. We assert the common-law right of juries to judge not only the facts but also the justice of the law.

We call for the full restoration of rights, including the right to vote and seek public office for those who have completed their sentencing. We further call for the immediate end to Louisiana’s practice of mass incarceration.

1.8 Death Penalty

We oppose the administration of the death penalty by all levels of government.

1.9 Self-Defense

The only legitimate use of force is in defense of individual rights-life, liberty, and justly acquired property against aggression. This right inheres in the individual, who may agree to be aided by any other individual or group. We affirm the individual right recognized by the Second Amendment to keep and bear arms, and oppose the prosecution of individuals for exercising their rights of self-defense. Private property owners should be free to establish their own conditions regarding the presence of personal defense weapons on their own property. We oppose all laws at any level of government restricting, registering, or monitoring the ownership, manufacture, or transfer of firearms or ammunition.

1.10 War on Drugs

We demand an end to the war on drugs. Our support is not limited merely to legalization of cannabis. We encourage individuals to reject the war propaganda that surrounds drug use.

1.11 Sex Workers Rights

We oppose the regulation and banning of any area of this industry when engaged in by consenting adults. We support the repeal of all laws regulating or prohibiting the possession, use, sale, production or distribution of sexually explicit material involving consenting adults. We reject the tying in of human trafficking with sex work and recognize that by pushing what could be a lucrative industry for millions of Americans into the shadows, it is those who oppose it that fuel human trafficking.

2.0 Economic Liberty

Libertarians want all members of society to have abundant opportunities to achieve economic success. A free and competitive market allocates resources in the most efficient manner. Each person has the right to offer goods and services to others on the free market. The only possible role of government, if any, in the economic realm is to protect property rights, adjudicate disputes, and provide a legal framework in which voluntary trade is protected. All efforts by government to redistribute wealth, or to control or manage trade, are improper in a free society.

2.1 Property and Contract

As respect for property rights is fundamental to maintaining a free and prosperous society, it follows that the freedom to contract to obtain, retain, profit from, manage, or dispose of one's property must also be upheld. Libertarians would free property owners from government restrictions on their rights to control and enjoy their property, as long as their choices do not harm or infringe on the rights of others. Eminent domain, civil asset forfeiture, governmental limits on profits, governmental production mandates, and governmental controls on prices of goods and services (including wages, rents, and interest) are abridgements of such fundamental rights. For voluntary dealings among private entities, parties should be free to choose with whom they trade and set whatever trade terms are mutually agreeable.

2.2 Environment

Competitive free markets and property rights stimulate the technological innovations and behavioral changes required to protect our environment and ecosystems. Private landowners and conservation groups have a vested interest in maintaining natural resources. Governments are unaccountable for damage done to our environment and have a terrible track record when it comes to environmental protection. Protecting the environment requires a clear definition and enforcement of individual rights and responsibilities regarding resources like land, water, air, and wildlife. Where damages can be proven and quantified in a court of law, restitution to the injured parties must be required.

2.3 Energy and Resources

While energy is needed to fuel a modern society, government should not be subsidizing any particular form of energy. We oppose all government control of energy pricing, allocation, and production.

2.4 Government Finance and Spending

All persons are entitled to keep the fruits of their labor. We call for the repeal of the income tax, the abolishment of the Internal Revenue Service and all federal programs and services not required under the U.S. Constitution. We oppose any legal requirements forcing employers to serve as tax collectors. Government should not incur debt, which burdens future generations without their consent. We support the passage of a "Balanced Budget Amendment" to the U.S. Constitution, provided that the budget is balanced exclusively by cutting expenditures, and not by raising taxes.

2.5 Government Employees

We favor repealing any requirement that one must join or pay dues to a union as a condition of government employment. We advocate replacing defined-benefit pensions with defined-contribution plans, as are commonly offered in the private sector, so as not to impose debt on future generations without their consent. We call for elimination of government positions whenever possible.

2.6 Money and Financial Markets

We favor free-market banking, with unrestricted competition among banks and depository institutions of all types. Markets are not actually free unless fraud, such as fractional reserve banking, is vigorously combated. Those who enjoy the possibility of profits must not impose risks of losses upon others, such as through government guarantees or bailouts. Individuals engaged in voluntary exchange should be free to use as money any mutually agreeable commodity, item, or cryptocurrency. We support a halt to inflationary monetary policies and unconstitutional legal tender laws.

2.7 Marketplace Freedom

Libertarians support free markets. We defend the right of individuals to form corporations, cooperatives and other types of entities based on voluntary association. We oppose all forms of government subsidies and bailouts to business, labor, or any other special interest. Government should not compete with private enterprise. We assert that disruptive block chain technology remain sovereign and free of regulation as global cyber tools that aim to fight corruption by decentralization. Non-violent technology of cyberspace should be left unhindered.

2.8 Labor Markets

Employment and compensation agreements between private employers and employees are outside the scope of government, and these contracts should not be encumbered by government-mandated benefits or social engineering. We support the right of private employers and employees to choose whether or not to bargain with each other through a labor union. Bargaining should be free of government interference, such as compulsory arbitration or imposing an obligation to bargain.

2.9 Education

Education is best provided by the free market, achieving greater quality, accountability and efficiency with more diversity of choice. Recognizing that the education of children is a parental responsibility, we would restore authority to parents to determine the education of their children, without interference from government. Parents should have control of and responsibility for all funds expended for their children's education. We call for the phase-in of the complete privatization of the education system.

2.10 Health Care

We demand a free-market health care system. We recognize the freedom of individuals to determine the level of health insurance they want (if any), the level of health care they want, the care providers they want, the medicines and treatments they will use and all other aspects of their medical care, including end-of-life decisions. People should be free to purchase health insurance across state lines. Government has no valid role in issuing, subsidizing, or requiring insurance.

2.11 Retirement and Income Security

Retirement and income security planning is the responsibility of the individual, not the government. Libertarians would phase out the current government-sponsored Social Security system and transition to a private voluntary system. The proper and most effective source of help for the poor is the voluntary efforts of private groups and individuals. We believe members of society will become even more charitable and civil society will be strengthened as government reduces its activity in this realm. We call for an end to all forms of involuntary welfare.

2.12 Taxation

You own yourself and the fruits of your labor and because we oppose the initiation of force, we hold that taxation is theft.

3.0 Securing Military

The protection of individual rights is the only possible purpose of government, if any. Government is constitutionally limited so as to prevent the infringement of individual rights by the government itself. The principle of non-initiation of force should guide the relationships between individuals, groups, and governments.

3.1 National Defense

We support the maintenance of a sufficient military to defend the United States against aggression. The United States should both avoid entangling alliances and abandon its attempts to act as a policeman for the world. We oppose any form of compulsory national service.

3.2 Internal Security and Individual Rights

The defense of the country requires that we have adequate intelligence to detect and to counter threats to domestic security. This requirement must not take priority over maintaining the civil liberties of our citizens. The Constitution and Bill of Rights shall not be suspended even during time of war. Intelligence agencies that legitimately seek to preserve the security of the nation must be subject to oversight and transparency. We oppose the government's use of secret classifications to keep from the public information that it should have, especially that which shows that the government has violated the law.

3.3 International Affairs

American foreign policy should seek an America at peace with the world. Our foreign policy should emphasize defense against attack from abroad and enhance the likelihood of peace by avoiding foreign entanglements. We would end the current U.S. government policy of foreign intervention, including military and economic aid. We recognize the right of all people to resist tyranny and defend themselves and their rights. We condemn the use of force, and especially the use of terrorism, against the innocent, regardless of whether such acts are committed by governments or by political or revolutionary groups.

3.4 Free Trade and Migration

We support the removal of governmental impediments to free trade. Political freedom and escape from tyranny demand that individuals not be unreasonably constrained by government in the crossing of political boundaries. Economic freedom demands the unrestricted movement of human as well as financial capital across national borders.

3.5 Rights and Discrimination

Libertarians embrace the concept that all people are born with certain inherent rights. We reject the idea that a natural right can ever impose an obligation upon others to fulfill that "right." We condemn collectivism such as racism or sexism as irrational and repugnant. Government should neither deny nor abridge a human right based upon sex, wealth, ethnicity, creed, age, national origin, personal habits, political preference or sexual orientation. Members of private organizations retain their rights to set whatever standards of association they deem appropriate, and individuals are free to respond with ostracism, boycotts and other free-market solutions.

3.6 Representative Government

Should governments exist, we support election systems that are more representative of the electorate at the federal, state and local levels. As private voluntary groups, political parties should be free to establish their own rules for nomination procedures, primaries and conventions. We call for an end to any tax-financed subsidies to candidates or parties and the repeal of all laws which restrict voluntary financing of election campaigns. We oppose laws that effectively exclude alternative candidates and parties, deny ballot access, gerrymander districts, or deny the voters their right to consider all legitimate alternatives. We advocate initiative, referendum, recall and repeal when used as popular checks on government.

3.7 Self-Determination

Whenever any form of government becomes destructive of individual liberty, it is the right of the people to alter or to abolish it, and to agree to such new governance as to them shall seem most likely to protect their liberty.

4.0 OMISSIONS

Our silence about any other particular government law, regulation, ordinance, directive, edict, control, regulatory agency, activity, or machination should not be construed to imply approval.

5.0 National Party Platform

We affirm and agree with the planks of the Libertarian Party Platform and its Statement of Principles.

== See also ==
- List of state Libertarian Parties in the United States
