= Libertarian Party of Nebraska =

State affiliate of the Libertarian Party

- Chairperson: Rachael Nelson
- Founded: 1971
- Membership (November 2024): 17,963
- Ideology: Libertarianism
- National affiliation: Libertarian Party
- Colors: a shade of Blue; Yellow
- Seats in the Nebraska Legislature (officially nonpartisan): 0 / 49
- U.S. Senate (Nebraska): 0 / 2
- U.S. House of Representatives (Nebraska): 0 / 3
- Other elected officials: 5 (June 2024)

Website
- www.lpne.org

The Libertarian Party of Nebraska is the Nebraska affiliate of the Libertarian Party. The party is headed by chairperson Rachael Nelson.

The party has maintained continuous ballot access since 2010, its current elected officials include a State Senator and a City Councilman, and it has moved occupational license reform legislation through the Nebraska Legislature.

== Party leadership ==
State Central Committee members:

- Chair – Rachael Nelson
- Vice Chair – Steve Sechrest
- Treasurer – Zach Nelson
- Secretary – Racheal Nelson
- District 1 Coordinator – Alex Vlach
- District 2 Coordinator – Patrick McNally
- District 3 Coordinator – Lacy Troester

== Ballot access ==
The Libertarian Party of Nebraska has held continuous ballot access from 2010 to the present. This kind of ballot access has long been considered a core goal for Libertarian Party state-level affiliates.

The Libertarian Party of Nebraska submitted petitions to the Secretary of State on August 2, 2010, requesting certification as a political party. These petitions contained approximately 8,000 signatures. The Libertarian Party was certified by the Secretary of State's office on August 12, 2010. The LP of Nebraska's candidate for Auditor of Public Accounts in 2010, Michele Sallach-Grace, won 20% of the vote and ensured the party would remain on the ballot through 2012.

Several Libertarians ran for office in 2012:

- Klaus Linder – La Vista Mayor
- Micheal Knebel – Bellevue City Council
- Jerry Kosch – Butler County Board of Supervisors
- Gene Siadek – Papio Missouri NRD Board
- Darrick J. Barclay – State Legislature
- Ben Backus – Gering City Council

The Libertarian Party of Nebraska received more than the 5% needed in at least one statewide general election race in 2014 to keep the party on the ballot in Nebraska through at least 2018:

- Governor – Mark Elworth, Jr. – 3.5% – 19,001 votes
- Lt. Governor – Scott Zimmerman – 3.5% – 19,001 votes
- Secretary of State – Ben Backus – 24.8% – 121,470 votes
- State Treasurer – Michael Knebel – 5.3% – 28,009 votes
- Representative in Congress – Steven Laird – District 2 – 5.3% – 9,021 votes
- Valley City Council – Felicia Jorgensen – 18% – 165 votes
- Fremont City Council – Michael Shallberg – 3rd Ward – 22.1% – 146 votes
- Johnson County Treasurer – John Sterup – 14.9% – 250 votes
- MUD Board (Outside Member) – Jonathan Corey Neurath – 7.7% – 682 votes

In 2017, Libertarian Senator Laura Ebke sponsored LB34 – a bill which gave ballot access to all parties with at least 10,000 voters without needing to collect signatures. The bill passed and became law without the signature of the Governor.

Several Libertarian Candidates ran for office in 2018;

Jim Schultz – US Senate – 24,606 Votes – 3.6%
Laura Ebke – Legislative District 32 – 6,243 Votes – 43.7%
John Sterup – Johnson County Treasurer – 440 Votes – 25.0%
John Harms – Platte County Supervisor District 1 – 367 Votes – 28.0%
Stephanie Pettit – McPherson County Treasurer – 26 Votes – 10.1%
Clint Pettit – McPherson County School Board – 53 Votes – 8.1%
Kurt Zadina – Scotts Bluff County Clerk – 2245 Votes – 22.4%
Matt Maly – Bruno Village Board – 12 Votes – 10.9%

== Current elected officials ==
The Libertarian Party elected their first candidate, Keith Ottersberg, to Wymore City Council in 2014. He won 70% of the vote, receiving 154 votes. In 2016, State Senator Laura Ebke changed her party affiliation from Republican to Libertarian. Also, in 2016, Ben Backus was elected to the Gering City Council, Ward 3.

== Legislative influence ==
As a Libertarian, Laura Ebke authored the Occupational Board Reform Act in 2017 to force legislative review of licenses every five years. After more than a year of resistance from industry groups it was passed in a 45 to 1 vote on April 23, 2018 in a rare tripartisan victory.
