= Unified Libertarians of Massachusetts =

Political party in Massachusetts

- Abbreviation: ULMA
- Chairperson: Sean Kennedy
- Founder: Andrew Cordio
- Founded: 2022; 4 years ago
- Split from: Libertarian Party of Massachusetts
- Ideology: Libertarianism; Paleolibertarianism
- National affiliation: Libertarian Party
- Colors: Gold-yellow
- Massachusetts Senate: 0 / 40
- Massachusetts House of Representatives: 0 / 160
- U.S. Senate (Massachusetts): 0 / 2
- U.S. House of Representatives (Massachusetts): 0 / 9

Website
- www.lpofma.org

The Unified Libertarians of Massachusetts (ULMA), also known as the Libertarian Party of Massachusetts, is the Massachusetts affiliate of the Libertarian Party.

== History ==
=== Split ===
In December 2021, the membership of the Libertarian Association of Massachusetts(LAMA) and all local county affiliates were unhappy with the current board's weak response to the covid governmental overreach, regularly meeting in secret executive session among other issues; in accordance with by-laws, a petition was circulated to call for a special state convention. In response, the existing Executive board removed the 47 members that signed the petition, with no notice. This removal was illegal and not in accordance with the by-laws of LAMA. Dissenting EXCOM member hosted and completed the special state convention on April 24th as required by the LAMA constitution and was open to all LAMA members. A new board was elected and to eliminate any confusion, renamed the organization The Unified Libertarians of Massachusetts (ULMA).

At the following 2022 Libertarian National Convention, ULMA was confirmed as the official affiliate of the National Libertarian Party. Subsequently, AMA was disaffiliated. Members that did not continue with ULMA joined the Liberal Party USA and the Democratic Party to more closely mirror their values.

=== Elections ===
ULMA supported Chase Oliver being the libertarian nominee for the Presidency in the 2024 United States presidential election, Oliver was officially nominated by the Unified Libertarians of Massachusetts. However, the Libertarians Party as a whole lost major party status in Massachusetts following the election. ULMA also did fundraising for Robert Kennedy until he decided to join the Trump Administration. As of June 2026, Al Ozonoff is running for State Auditor; with 3% of the vote, ULMA will regain major party status. ULMA has several members holding local offices, such as city councilors, selectmen, and school board members.
