= Libertarian Party of Maine =

State affiliate of the Libertarian Party

- Chairperson: Dane Courtois
- Headquarters: PO Box 13, Bangor, ME 04402-0013
- Ideology: Libertarianism
- National affiliation: Libertarian Party (United States)
- Colors: Gold-yellow
- Seats in the U.S. Senate: 0 / 2
- Seats in the U.S. House: 0 / 2
- Seats in the Maine Senate: 0 / 35
- Seats in the Maine House: 0 / 151
- Nonvoting seats in the Maine House: 0 / 3
- Other elected officials: 2 (June 2024)

Website
- www.lpme.org

The Libertarian Party of Maine (LPME) is the Maine affiliate of the Libertarian Party.

The LPME has had a repeating cycle of activity and hiatus since its founding. It has been active since the 2012 election cycle, with a fully constituted State committee, securing the placement of 2012 Libertarian Party Presidential Nominee Gary Johnson onto the Maine general election ballot for the 2012 election and the endorsement of Andrew Ian Dodge the United States Senate election in Maine, 2012.

In 2015, the LPME sought to become a ballot-qualified political party by registering 5,000 or more voters into the party by December of that year. The party submitted over 6,400 registration forms to the Secretary of State. However, approximately 2,000 were found to be invalid. The party sued and, in May 2016, a judge in U.S. District Court allowed the Libertarian Party to register more voters into the party to obtain the 5,000 registrant minimum needed to receive a spot on the 2016 ballot for their presidential nominee. It was announced that they met the threshold on July 13, 2016, allowing Presidential candidate Gary Johnson to appear on the ballot. To maintain their status, they needed 10,000 registered Libertarians to vote in November 2016.

In November 2016, Libertarian Party (United States) Presidential candidate Gary Johnson received at least 5% of the state presidential votes. This gave the LPME official party status in the state of Maine, becoming the fourth recognized party by the state.

On 8 September 2017, Androscoggin County commissioner Zakk Maher became the LPME's first elected official when he defected from the Maine Republican Party.

After the 2018 election, the LPME lost party status as it did not receive 10,000 cumulative votes of registered Libertarians.

On December 11, 2020, the party's declaration of intent to form a recognized party was recognized by the State of Maine. To become a qualifying party and participate in primary elections, the party must have 5,000 registered voters by January 2, 2022. In order to maintain this status, the party must have 10,000 registered voters cast ballots in the November 2022 state election.

On December 14, 2020, Maine State Representative, John Andrews of House District 73, announced his intent to leave the Republican party and enroll as a Libertarian, becoming Maine's first Libertarian state legislator, although he rejoined the GOP in 2022 and will run for re-election as a Republican.

In 2024 the party was designated as a qualified party, negating further need for a petition drive to gain presidential ballot access (though it must maintain enrollment minimums to maintain this status). As of 2026 it was one of four parties (Libertarian, Green, Republican, and Democrat) to hold qualified status.

== LPME state committee ==
- Chair: Dane Courtois
- Vice Chair: Jim Baines
- Treasurer: Jason Mataafa
- Secretary: Ben Tucker
- Eastern Region Representative: Bryan Stevens
- Central Region Representative: Shawn Levasseur
- Western Region Representative: Joe Petrocy
- Southern Region Representative: Joseph Weeks

== See also ==
- List of state Libertarian Parties in the United States
