= Libertarian Party of South Dakota =

State affiliate of the Libertarian Party

- Chairperson: Greg Baldwin
- Founded: 1992
- Membership (2021): 2,429
- Ideology: Libertarianism
- National affiliation: Libertarian Party
- Colors: Gold; Blue
- South Dakota Senate: 0 / 35
- South Dakota House of Representatives: 0 / 70
- U.S. Senate (South Dakota): 0 / 2
- U.S. House of Representatives (South Dakota): 0 / 1
- Other elected officials: 0 (June 2024)

Website
- http://LPSouthDakota.org/

The Libertarian Party of South Dakota is the South Dakota affiliate of the national Libertarian Party.

== Background ==
The Libertarian Party of South Dakota aims to promote Libertarian policies and support Libertarian candidates throughout the state. According to the secretary of state's office, there were approximately 1,930 registered Libertarian voters in South Dakota as of April 2020.

In 2006, South Dakota's Libertarian nominees for governor and attorney general received 1.0 percent and 2.7 percent of the vote respectively. In 2012, the Libertarian nominee for public utilities commissioner received 5.7 percent. During the 2014 election cycle, the party nominated Libertarian candidates to challenge unopposed Republican candidates in three statewide races. Chad Haber, the 2014 Libertarian nominee for attorney general, received 18.0 percent of the vote. Kurt Evans, the party's 2014 nominee for state auditor, received 20.1 percent, and John English, the 2014 nominee for commissioner of school and public lands, received 23.5 percent.

In the 2020 United States House of Representatives elections, Libertarian candidate Randy Luallin won 19 percent of the vote statewide, including winning the majority of the votes in two counties.

In the 2022 United States House of Representatives elections, Libertarian Candidate Collin Duprel won 23 percent of the vote statewide, becoming the most successful Libertarian Congressional Candidate of all time, including winning the majority of the votes in two counties.
