= Libertarian Party of Mississippi =

State affiliate of the Libertarian Party

- Chairperson: Jonathan Dantzler
- Senate leader: None
- House leader: None
- Founded: 1990
- Headquarters: Jackson
- Ideology: Libertarianism
- National affiliation: Libertarian Party (United States)
- Colors: Blue; Gold
- Mississippi Senate: 0 / 52
- Mississippi House of Representatives: 0 / 122
- U.S. Senate (Mississippi): 0 / 2
- U.S. House of Representatives (Mississippi): 0 / 4
- Other elected officials: 1 (June 2024)

Website
- http://www.mslp.org

The Libertarian Party of Mississippi is the Mississippi affiliate of the U.S. Libertarian Party. The Chair is Jonathan Dantzler, Vice Chair is Brad Thomas, Autumn Fox is Secretary, and Shaun McIninish is Treasurer.

== Platform ==
The Libertarian Party of Mississippi holds the same platform as the U.S. Libertarian Party While also sharing Conservative views to match those of Mississippians. Some of the key tenets are:

- Limited government
- Fiscal management
- Individual responsibility
- A world at peace
- Protection of civil liberties
- A Laissez-faire economic system
- A maximization of personal liberties
- An uninhibited right to bear arms
- A free market healthcare system
- A foreign policy of non-interventionism
- A system of domestic and foreign free trade
- Term Limits for all Elected Officials term limits
- School Choice, and Children’s savings account school choice
- Elimination of the State Income Tax, and Grocery Taxes

== Electoral record ==
In 2017, Steve McCluskey was elected mayor of McLain, Mississippi, the state's first elected member of the Libertarian Party of Mississippi.
