= Libertarian Party of Vermont =

State affiliate of the Libertarian Party

- Chairperson: Olga Mardach-Duclerc
- Founded: 1971
- Headquarters: Burlington, Vermont
- Ideology: Libertarianism
- National affiliation: Libertarian Party
- Colors: Yellow; Gray (also sometimes Red, Blue)
- U.S. Senate: 0 / 2
- U.S. House: 0 / 1
- Statewide Offices: 0 / 6
- State Senate: 0 / 30
- State House: 0 / 150
- County Judges: 0 / 42
- Countywide Offices: 0 / 42
- Mayorships: 0 / 8
- Burlington City Council: 0 / 12
- Other elected officials: 0 (June 2024)

Website
- vtliberty.org

The Libertarian Party of Vermont is the Vermont affiliate of the Libertarian Party. The state chair is Olga Mardach-Duclerc.

The Libertarian Party is the 5th largest in Vermont after the Democratic, Republican, Progressive, and Liberty Union Parties.

In 1998, Neil Randall was elected to the Vermont House of Representatives as a Libertarian, representing Orange County's 3rd district. He left the party, but was re-elected in 2000 as a Republican.

The party ran two candidates in the 2016 elections for Vermont House, as well as other candidates for local offices.

Several Libertarian candidates ran in 2018, including four State Senate seats.

In May 2023, Republican state representative Jarrod Sammis switched to the Libertarian Party.

Matt Hill ran for United States Senate in 2024.
