= Libertarian Party of Missouri =

State affiliate of the Libertarian Party

- Chairperson: Dustin Coffell
- Senate leader: None
- House leader: None
- Founded: 1971; 55 years ago
- Headquarters: Columbia, MO; Jefferson City, MO
- Ideology: Libertarianism
- National affiliation: Libertarian Party (United States)
- Colors: a shade of Blue; Yellow
- Missouri Senate: 0 / 34
- Missouri House of Representatives: 0 / 163
- U.S. Senate (Missouri): 0 / 2
- U.S. House of Representatives (Missouri): 0 / 8
- Other elected officials: 0 (June 2024)

Website
- www.lpmo.org

The Libertarian Party of Missouri is the Missouri affiliate of the Libertarian Party. Founded in 1971 along with the national party, it was recognized as a state affiliate the following year. The state chair is Dustin Coffell. The party has been an established party in Missouri with ballot access since 1992 due to the state's threshold of vote percentage required for ballot access (2% of the votes in a statewide race). In 2024 it was the only third party officially recognized by Missouri. This kind of ballot access has long been considered a core goal for Libertarian Party state-level affiliates.

== Elected office holders ==
- Karey Owens - Wright City Ward 1 alderman
- Ken Elliott - Lincoln County Fire Board

At least eight other Missouri Libertarians were formerly elected Officeholders.

== See also ==
- Tamara Millay
- Gary Nolan
