= Cultural liberalism =

Cultural perspective emphasising permissiveness of traditionally shunned behaviour

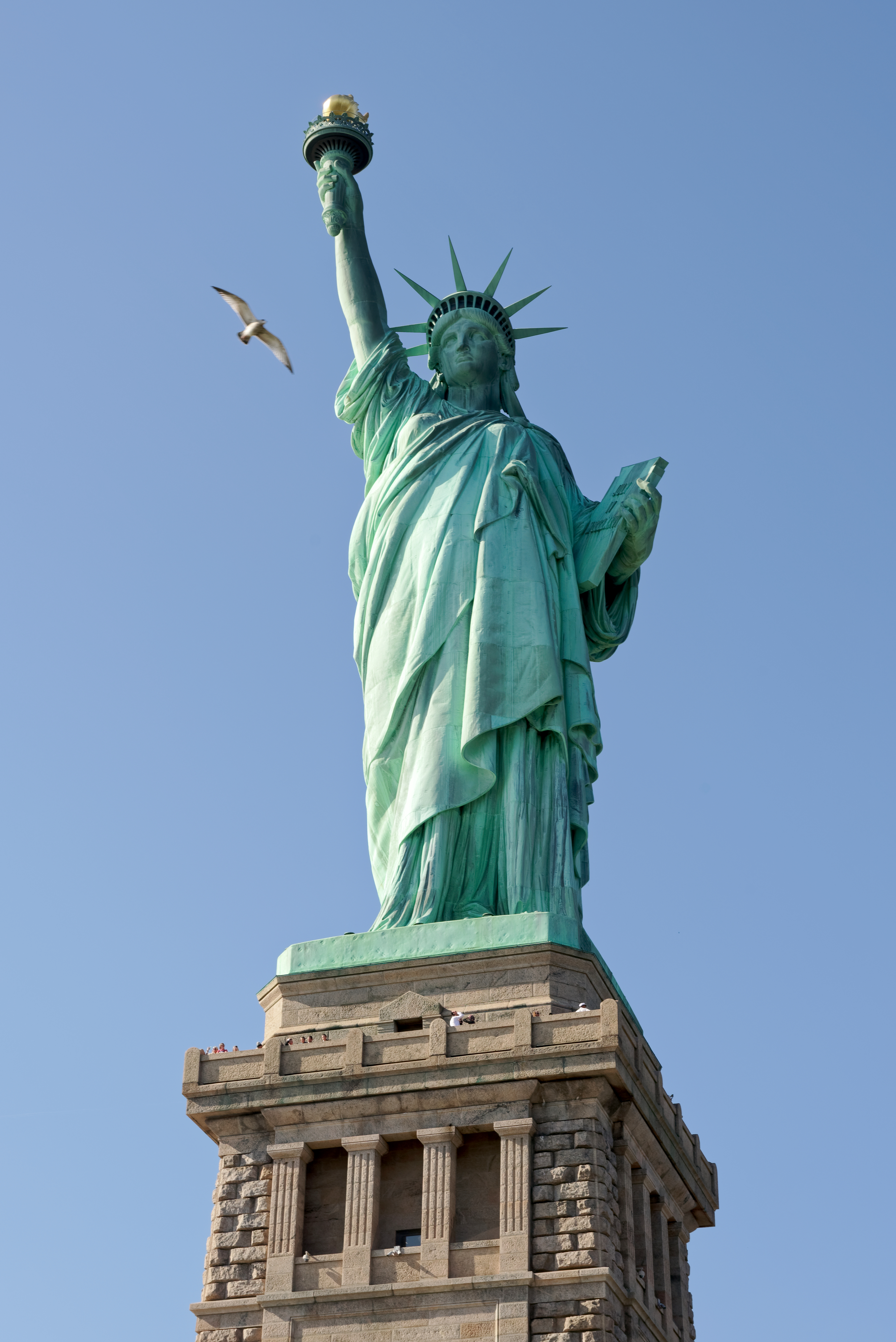
The Statue of Liberty is often used as a symbol of enlightenment liberalism.

Cultural liberalism, also known as civil liberalism or colloquially as social liberalism in the United States and Canada, is a social philosophy which expresses the social-relational dimension of liberalism and advocates the freedom of individuals to choose whether to conform to cultural norms. In the words of Henry David Thoreau, it is often expressed as the right to "march to the beat of a different drummer".

While those in United States often refer to cultural liberalism as social liberalism, this is not the same as the more comprehensive political ideology known as social liberalism (which uses social in economic terms, i.e. social democracy). In the United States, social liberalism describes progress-oriented moral and social values or stances on socio-cultural issues such as abortion and same-sex marriage as opposed to cultural or social conservatism. A social conservative or a social liberal in this sense may hold either more conservative or progressive views on fiscal policy.

== Modern usage ==
As with modern liberalism in general, cultural liberalism often implies the fundamental liberal principles of individual liberty, autonomy, and equality.

Cultural liberalism places a strong emphasis on the protection and expansion of civil rights and liberties, recognizing them as fundamental to individual autonomy and societal progress. This philosophical stance aligns with core liberal principles articulated in foundational texts and international declarations such as the manifesto of the Liberal International.

John Stuart Mill, in his seminal work On Liberty, argues for the paramount importance of individual liberty, asserting that society should only interfere with an individual's freedom of action to prevent harm to others.

== History ==
The emergence of cultural liberalism is tied to the broader historical development of liberalism, which challenges traditional norms of religious conformity and ascribed status. While the term "liberal" gained political currency in the early 19th century, the underlying principles of individual liberty and tolerance have roots in the Enlightenment and movements like the Protestant Reformation, which emphasized individual conscience. In 1981, Gérard Grunberg, Etienne Schweisguth, et al. popularized the term "cultural liberalism" in their book France de gauche, vote à droite.

In recent decades, particularly since the mid-20th century, Western Europe has seen what Vincent Tournier describes as a "cultural take-off" characterized by the liberalization of moral standards and lifestyles. Tournier claims that the rise cultural liberalism can be attributed to post-war changes such as increased living standards, urbanization, mass schooling, and secularization, leading to a distancing from traditional authority and a greater emphasis on individual autonomy. Civil libertarianism is considered a more radical form of cultural liberalism coming from the tradition of classical liberalism.

== See also ==
- Civil libertarianism
- Cultural radicalism
- Permissive society
- Secular liberalism
- Social progressivism
- Tightness–looseness theory

== Bibliography ==
- Willard, Charles Arthur (1996). Liberalism and the Problem of Knowledge: A New Rhetoric for Modern Democracy. University of Chicago Press. ISBN 978-0226898452. OCLC 33967621.
