= Jo Jorgensen 2020 presidential campaign =

American political campaign

Jo Jorgensen for President
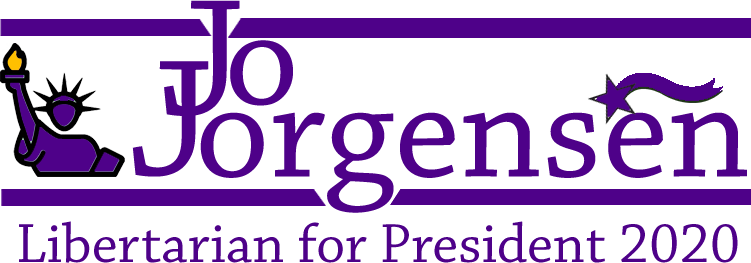
- Campaign: 2020 Libertarian primaries 2020 U.S. presidential election
- Candidate: Jo Jorgensen; Senior lecturer at Clemson University; Spike Cohen; Podcaster and businessman
- Affiliation: Libertarian Party
- Status: Announced: November 2, 2019; Official nominee: May 23, 2020; Lost election: November 3, 2020
- Headquarters: Greenville, South Carolina
- Key people: Steve Dasbach (campaign manager)
- Receipts: US$3,405,357 (November 23, 2020)
- Slogan(s): Real Change for Real People; She's With Us! Let Her Speak; I'm With Her; Break Free From Big Government

Website
- www.jo20.com

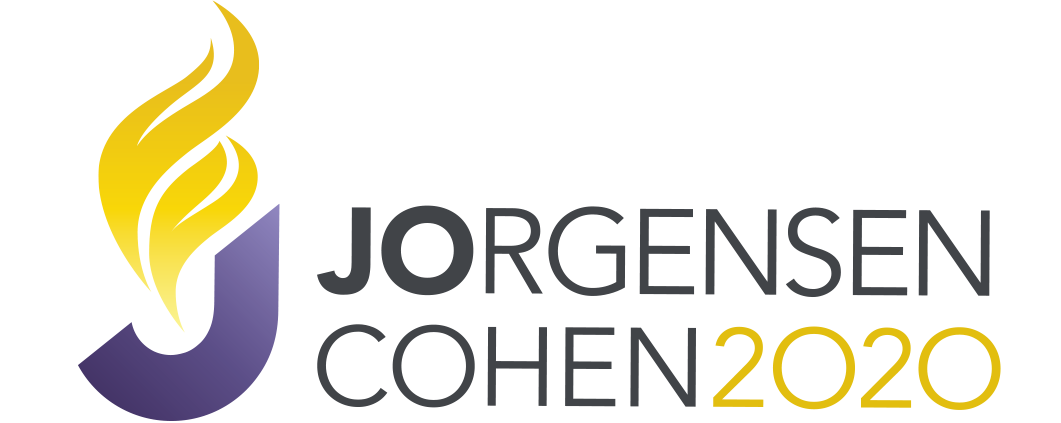
Original campaign logo

The 2020 presidential campaign of Jo Jorgensen was formally launched on November 2, 2019, at the South Carolina Libertarian Party convention. Jorgensen had previously been the Libertarian Party's vice presidential nominee in 1996, when she ran on a ticket with author Harry Browne. Currently a senior lecturer of psychology at Clemson University, Jorgensen had owned a software company at the time of her 1996 vice presidential candidacy.

Jorgensen's positions are typically described as being consistent with the Libertarian Party's platform. Her campaign has received less media coverage than those of Gary Johnson, former Republican governor of New Mexico and Jorgensen's predecessor as the Libertarian Party's presidential nominee in 2012 and 2016. Her name recognition upon entering the race is also widely considered to have been lower than Johnson's. Although Jorgensen is often described as appealing to the Libertarian Party's base, some in the party, such as her main primary opponent Future of Freedom Foundation founder Jacob Hornberger, have criticized her for perceived departures from libertarian ideology in exchange for mainstream appeal.

The Libertarian Party experienced a competitive primary. On May 23, at the virtual 2020 Libertarian National Convention, Jorgensen was selected as the party's 2020 presidential nominee after four rounds of voting by delegates. She is the party's first female presidential nominee. Podcaster Spike Cohen—Vermin Supreme's original running mate—was selected to be Jorgensen's running mate the next day, despite Jorgensen having expressed a preference for fellow presidential candidate John Monds.

== Background ==
In 1996, Jorgensen was nominated by the Libertarian Party as its candidate for vice president in the 1996 election. The party's presidential nominee was free market writer and investment analyst Harry Browne. The Browne/Jorgensen ticket received 485,798 votes (0.5% of the popular vote) in the general election, which was won by incumbent president Bill Clinton. Jorgensen had previously run for South Carolina's 4th congressional district in 1992, receiving 4,286 votes (2.2% of the popular vote).

== Platform ==
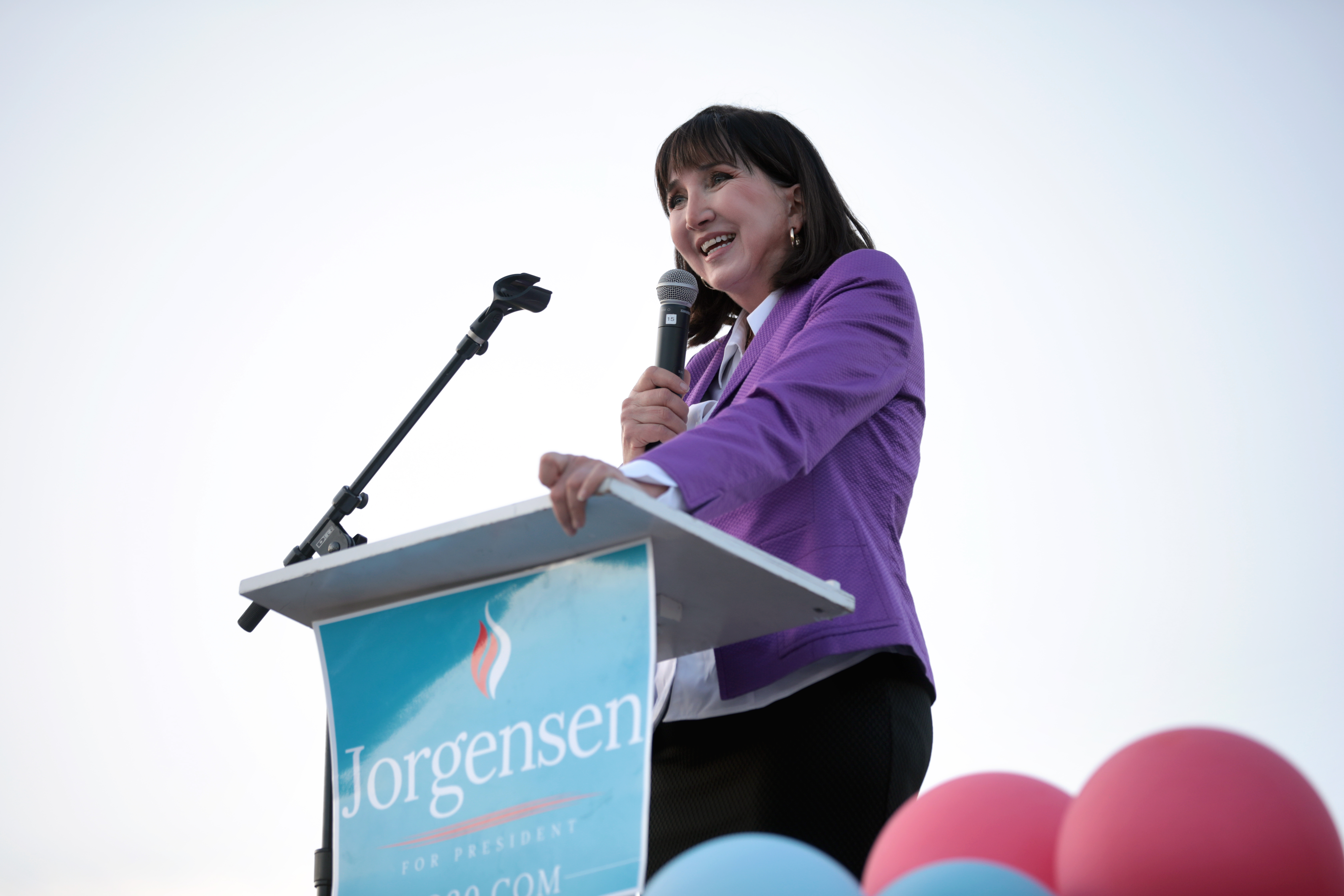
Jorgensen speaking at a rally in Scottsdale, Arizona, October 10, 2020

=== Healthcare and social security ===
Jorgensen supports a free-market healthcare system financed by individual spending accounts that could keep any savings, which she believes would increase healthcare providers' incentive to compete by meeting consumer demand for low-cost services. She opposes single-payer healthcare, calling it "disastrous".

Jorgensen supports replacing Social Security with individual retirement accounts. In the final debate of the 2020 primaries, candidate Jacob Hornberger accused Jorgensen of "support[ing] the welfare state through Social Security and Medicare". In response, she called Social Security a "Ponzi scheme". She then expressed the desire to allow people to opt out of the program on her first day in office, while emphasizing the constitutional inability of a president to unilaterally end the program without Congress's support, as well as the need for the government to fulfill existing Social Security obligations. Under Jorgensen's plan, those who opt out would put 6.2% of their payroll taxes in individual retirement accounts and receive prorated Social Security benefits for existing contributions as zero-coupon bonds for retirement.

=== Criminal justice and drug policy ===
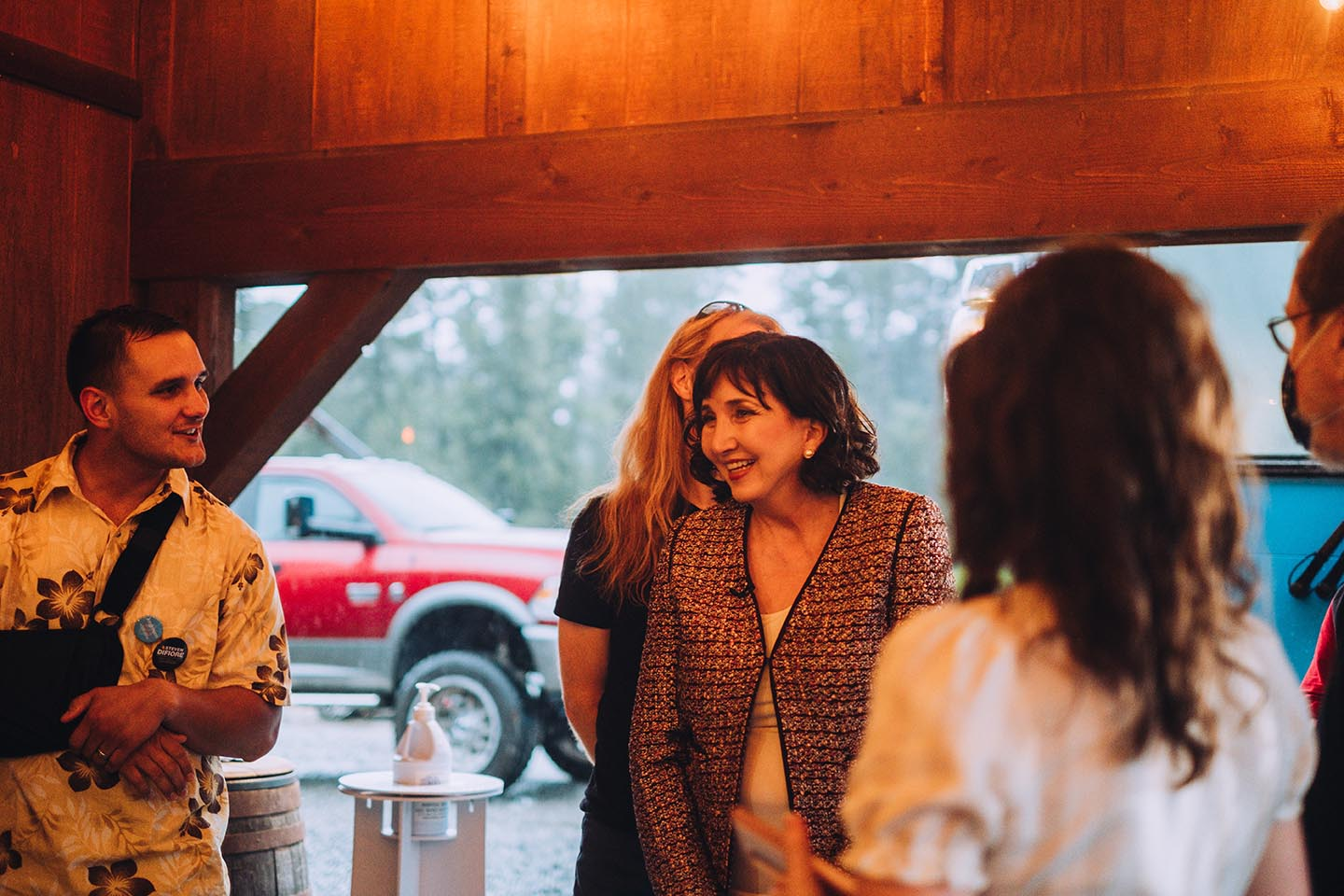
Jorgensen at a rally in Durham, North Carolina, in 2020

Jorgensen opposes federal civil asset forfeiture and qualified immunity. She opposes the war on drugs and supports abolishing drug laws, promising to pardon all nonviolent drug offenders. She has urged the demilitarization of police. Additionally, Jorgensen supports the Second Amendment.

=== Foreign policy and defense ===
Jorgensen opposes embargoes, economic sanctions, and foreign aid; she supports non-interventionism, armed neutrality, and the withdrawal of U.S. troops from abroad.

=== Immigration, economics, and trade ===
Jorgensen calls for deregulation, arguing that it would reduce poverty. She supports cutting government spending to reduce taxes.

Jorgensen supports the freedom of American citizens to travel and trade, calls for the elimination of trade barriers and tariffs, and supports the repeal of quotas on the number of people who can legally enter the United States to work, visit, or reside. In a Libertarian presidential primary debate, Jorgensen said she would immediately stop construction on President Donald Trump's border wall. During another primary debate she blamed anti-immigration sentiment on disproportionate media coverage of crimes by immigrants. She argued that immigration helps the economy and that the blending of cultures is beneficial.

=== COVID-19 ===
Jorgensen has characterized the U.S. government's response to the COVID-19 pandemic as overly bureaucratic and authoritarian, calling restrictions on individual behavior (such as stay-at-home orders) and corporate bailouts "the biggest assault on our liberties in our lifetime".

Jorgensen opposes government mask mandates, considering mask-wearing a matter of personal choice. She argues that mask-wearing would be widely adopted without government intervention because market competition would drive businesses to adopt either mask-required or mask-optional policies, allowing consumers the freedom to choose their preferred environment. Jorgensen has invoked the analogy of dollar voting to argue that consumer preferences would shape businesses' policies on face masks in the absence of a government mandate.

== Primary campaign ==
Jorgensen's state-by-state performance in the primaries Jo Jorgensen Jacob Hornberger Vermin Supreme No preference

In the Libertarian primaries, Jorgensen placed second in terms of overall votes cast, behind Future of Freedom Foundation founder Jacob Hornberger. Jorgensen won a single primary prior to the convention, in Nebraska, on May 12, 2020. After Justin Amash entered and then exited the race Jacob Hornberger lost a significant number of votes and on the fourth round of balloting Jorgensen was nominated. She did not endorse anybody to be her running mate and after three ballots Spike Cohen was nominated. After her nomination, she went on to win the New Mexico primary on June 2, 2020, which had been postponed due to the COVID-19 pandemic.

== General election campaign ==
=== Ballot access ===
Jorgensen achieved ballot access in all 50 states and the District of Columbia on September 15, 2020.

=== Website crash ===
After the first presidential debate between Donald Trump and Joe Biden, Jorgensen's website crashed due to high volume of traffic.

== Campaign finance ==
Jorgensen raised $3,442,156 on her presidential campaign, loaning $9,784 of her own money to her campaign and raising $3,415,793 from individual contributions. She spent $3,420,928 and has $106,132 in outstanding debts with $21,228 of ending cash in hand.

Candidate	Campaign committee					
Candidate	Raised	Total loans	Ind. contrib.	Item. Ind. contrib.	Unitem. Ind. contrib.	Spent
Jo Jorgensen	$3,442,156	$9,784	$3,415,793	$1,113,598	$2,302,196	$3,420,928

== Results ==
Jo Jorgensen's state-by-state performance across the nation. Percentage shades are rough increments of 0.25%.

Jo Jorgensen received 1,865,535 total votes and 1.2% of the national vote, coming third in the nation. She achieved the Libertarian Party's second strongest historical result to date behind Gary Johnson's 2016 presidential campaign. The highest percentage of votes received by Jorgensen was in South Dakota, where she received 2.63% or 11,095 votes.

== Endorsements ==
Jorgensen has received endorsements from Kennedy, Peter Schiff, John Stossel, and Katherine Timpf, among others. She has also received endorsements from many former Libertarian candidates in the 2020 race, including Jacob Hornberger, Justin Amash, Adam Kokesh and Vermin Supreme. In addition, she received an endorsement from 2012 and 2016 Libertarian nominee Gary Johnson.
