= Vermin Supreme 2020 presidential campaign =

American political campaign

Pony Up for Vermin Supreme
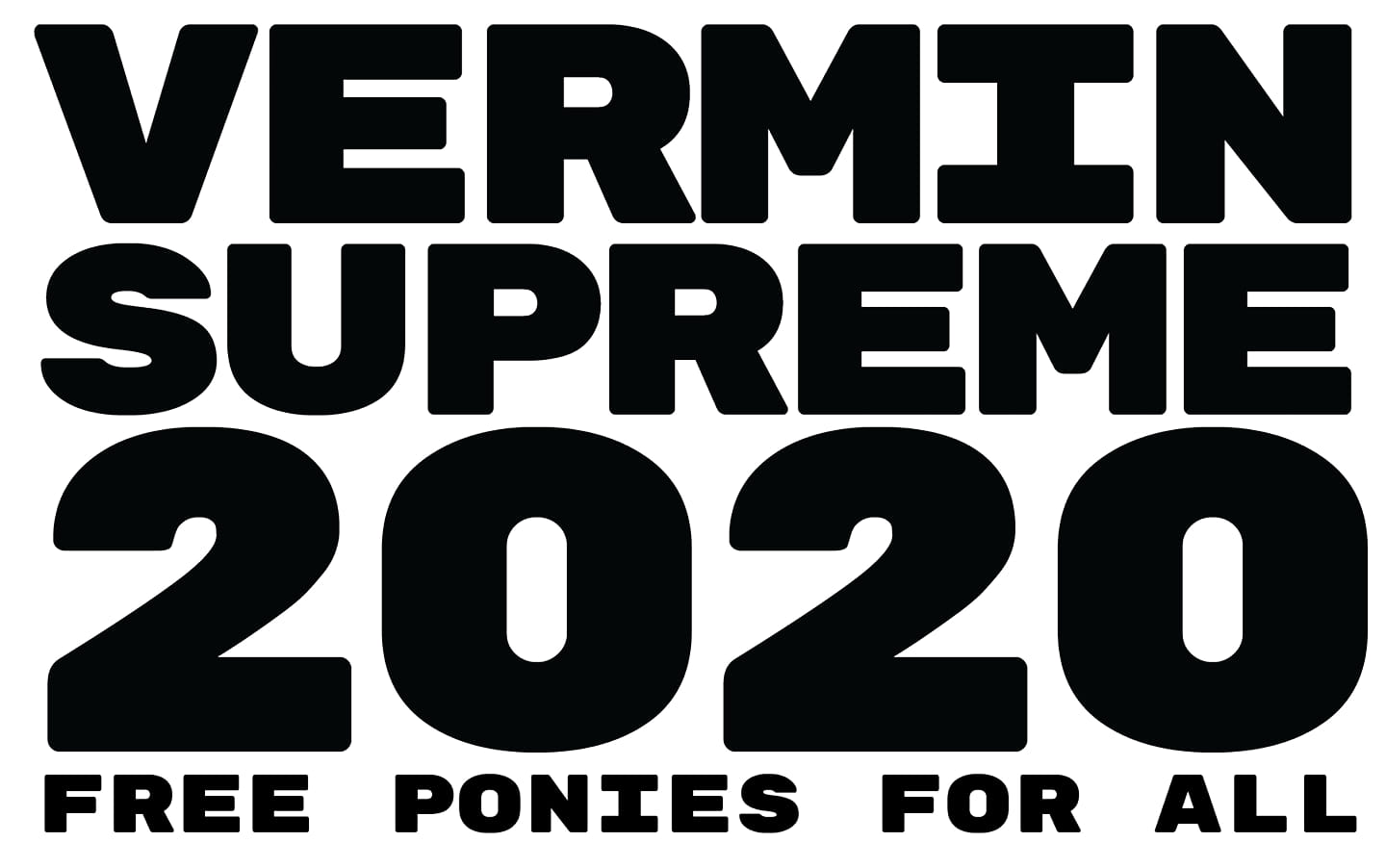
- Campaign: 2020 United States presidential election (Libertarian primaries)
- Candidate: Vermin Supreme; Perennial candidate and performance artist Spike Cohen; Podcaster
- Affiliation: Libertarian Party
- Status: Inactive
- Announced: May 18, 2019
- Suspended: May 23, 2020
- Key people: Desarae Lindsey (campaign manager); Richard Manzo (chief strategist)
- Receipts: US$59,068.35 (May 13, 2020)
- Slogan(s): This is the way. In on the joke. Pony up America.

Website
- verminsupreme2020.com (archived November 14, 2020) inonthejoke.net (archived May 21, 2020)

The 2020 presidential campaign of Vermin Supreme began on June 26, 2019, and ended during the 2020 Libertarian National Convention; Supreme failed to win the nomination.

== Background ==
Vermin Supreme is a perennial candidate who has run in several United States presidential primaries. Supreme has run in the 2004 Democratic Party presidential primaries, the 2008 Republican presidential primaries, and the 2012 and 2016 Democratic Party presidential primaries.

After having announced plans in 2018 of running for the 2020 Libertarian Party presidential nomination, Supreme filed his candidacy with the FEC on June 26, 2019. According to FEC filings, he chose Desarae Lindsey as his campaign manager. He also chose Richard Manzo, budget committeeman in Goffstown, New Hampshire as his chief strategist. Supreme has described his campaign staff as including "about a dozen people around the country with the various state coordinators," and his effort as "ultimately [his] first real campaign".

== Campaign ==
Vermin Supreme appeared on Fox News' Watter's World on May 18, 2019 to discuss his campaign for the Libertarian nomination.

In December 2019, Supreme selected Spike Cohen as his running mate.

On January 11, 2020, Supreme won a non-binding presidential preference poll conducted internally by the Libertarian Party of New Hampshire, winning 26 out of 44 votes cast. The primary was tabulated using Bucklin voting. On March 3, 2020, Supreme was declared the winner of the Massachusetts primary. On May 23, Supreme placed third on the national Libertarian Party's final round of balloting. Supreme's former running mate, Spike Cohen, went on to win the Libertarian Party's vice presidential nomination.

=== Satirical candidacy ===
Many have cited Vermin Supreme's presidential campaign as harmful to the credibility or image of the Libertarian Party. As Supreme told New Hampshire magazine, "It's been a very interesting sell trying to convince the Libertarian Party that a serious party can take a joke candidate and get their 5% without being pegged as a joke party." Spike Cohen, Supreme's running mate, remarked that their campaign is "perfectly serious". Explaining the campaign's message, Cohen said, "it's the system that's a joke and it treats us as a joke and it treats the idea of having more than two options as a joke. We're changing the punch line by trolling the system." Supreme has said that, in contrast to his past runs for the presidency, he considers this campaign a "serious" bid.
