= Libertarian Party of South Carolina =

State affiliate of the Libertarian Party

South Carolina Libertarian Party
- Chairperson: Jeff Laitinen
- Founded: September 28, 1975
- Headquarters: 10120 Two Notch Road; Suite 2-324; Columbia, SC 29223
- Ideology: Libertarianism
- National affiliation: Libertarian Party
- Colors: Dark gray, gold, and white
- South Carolina Senate: 0 / 46
- South Carolina House of Representatives: 0 / 124
- U.S. Senate (South Carolina): 0 / 2
- U.S. House of Representatives (South Carolina): 0 / 7
- Other elected officials: 0 (June 2024)

Website
- sclp.org

The South Carolina Libertarian Party is a ballot-qualified political party in the state of South Carolina. It is the state affiliate party of the national Libertarian Party of the United States. The state chair is Jeff Laitinen.

== Elected officials ==
As of 2016, there are two Libertarian officeholders in the state of South Carolina, both of whom were elected to non-partisan positions.

- Bill Woolsey – James Island Mayor
- Kathy Rice Woolsey – Soil and Water District Supervisor, Charleston County

== 2022 South Carolina Election Cycle ==
Four candidates secured the South Carolina Libertarian Party nomination for statewide offices.

- Dr. Morgan Bruce Reeves and Jessica Ethridge for Governor and Lt. Governor
- John Davis for SC House District 85
- Rodney Travis for SC House District 109

== 2020 convention and debate ==
On November 2, 2019, the South Carolina Libertarian Party held its business convention for the 2020 election cycle in Florence, South Carolina.

Delegates and alternates to the 2020 Libertarian National Convention in Austin, Texas, were elected at this convention.

That evening, a Presidential Candidate Debate was held at Francis Marion University Chapman Auditorium.

Libertarian Party candidates meeting the following criteria were invited to participate: Constitutionally qualified to be elected to the office; current sustaining member of the national party; filed with the FEC as a candidate for the Libertarian nomination; and raised $5,000 or more from sources other than the candidate or immediate family by the end of Labor Day Weekend. Fusion candidates were disqualified from the debate.

Based on FEC reports and communication with candidates, the following were considered qualified and participated in the debate:

Candidate invited	Accepted
Kenneth Armstrong	Yes
Dan Behrman	Yes
Jo Jorgensen	Yes
Adam Kokesh	Yes
Kim Ruff	Yes
Vermin Supreme	Yes

== Presidential nominee results in South Carolina ==
Year	Nominee	Votes
1980	Ed Clark	4,975 (0.6%)
1984	David Bergland	4,360 (0.5%)
1988	Ron Paul	4,935 (0.5%)
1992	Andre Marrou	2,719 (0.2%)
1996	Harry Browne	4,271 (0.4%)
2000	Harry Browne	4,888 (0.4%)
2004	Michael Badnarik	3,608 (0.2%)
2008	Bob Barr (campaign)	7,283 (0.4%)
2012	Gary Johnson (campaign)	16,321 (0.8%)
2016	Gary Johnson (campaign)	47,698 (2.4%)
2020	Jo Jorgensen (campaign)	27,916 (1.1%)
