= 2020 Libertarian Party presidential primaries =

- January 11 to June 2, 2020

Non-binding preferential vote
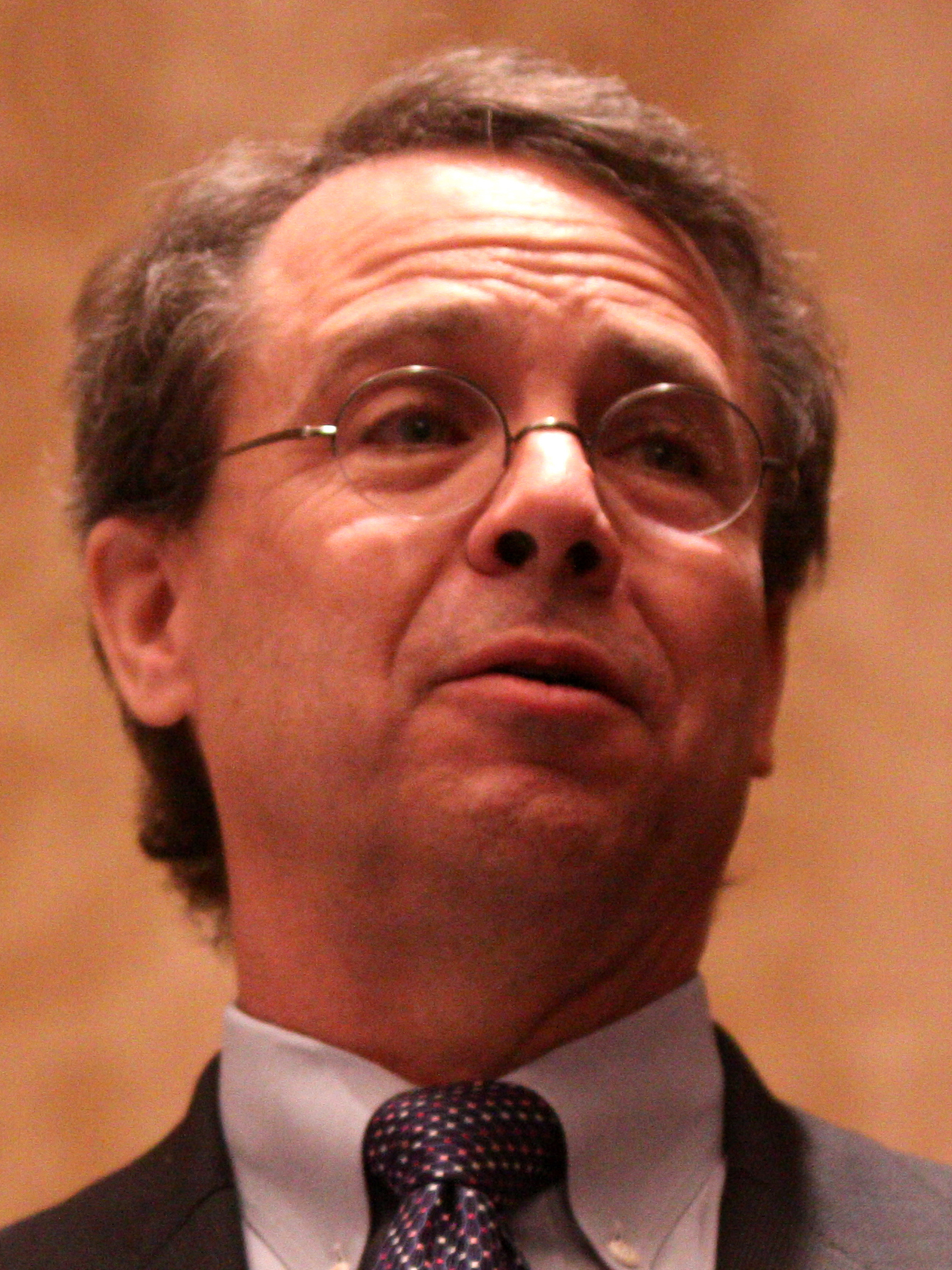

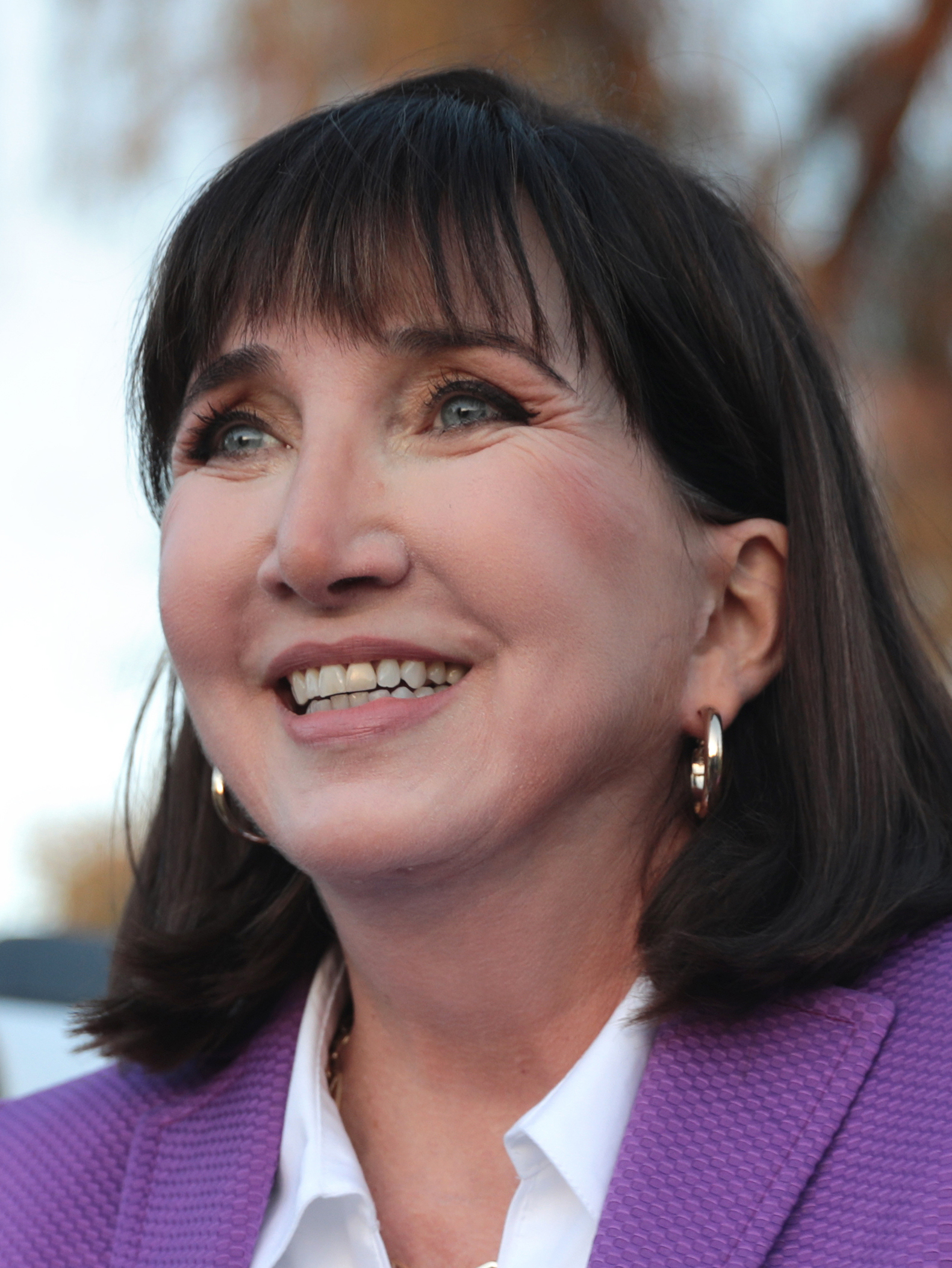

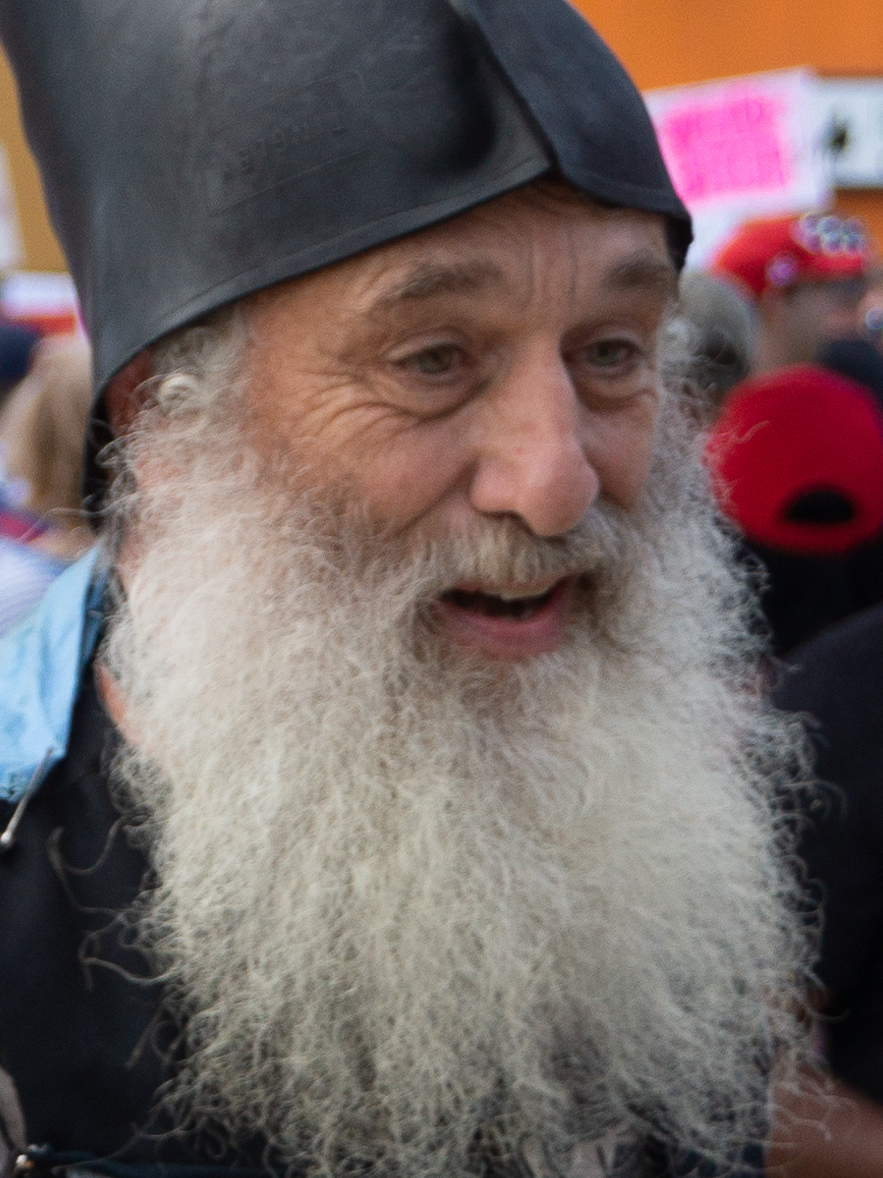

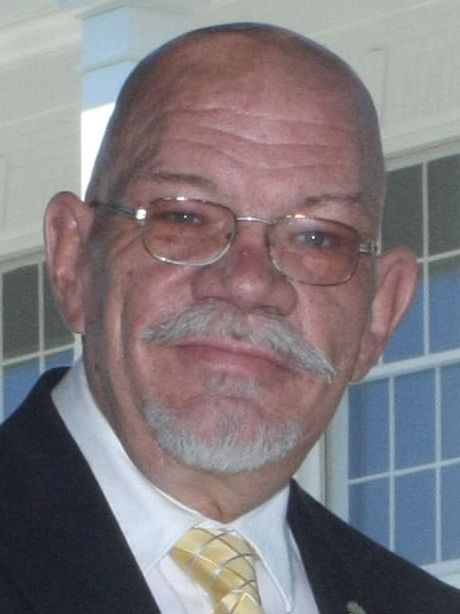

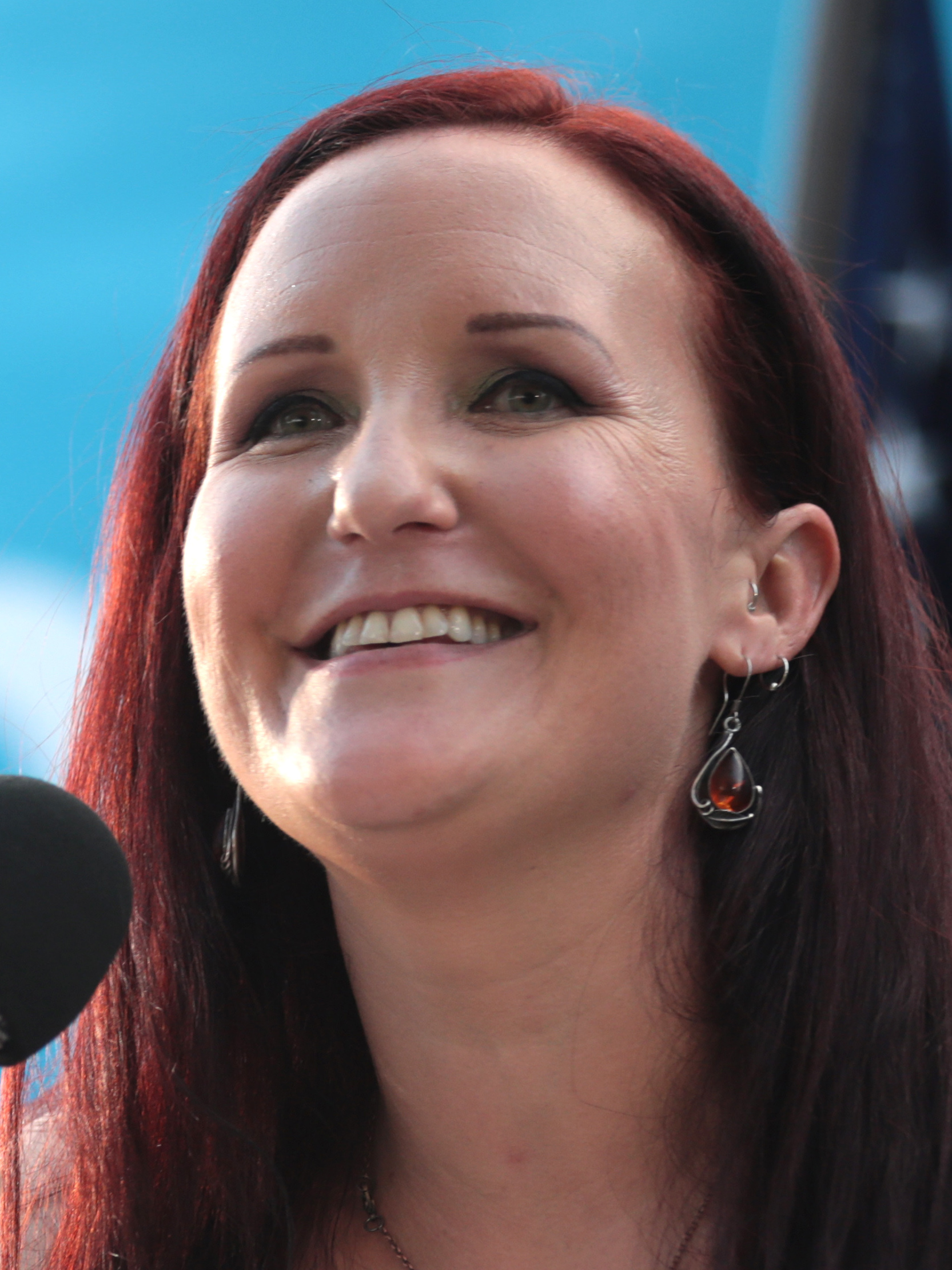

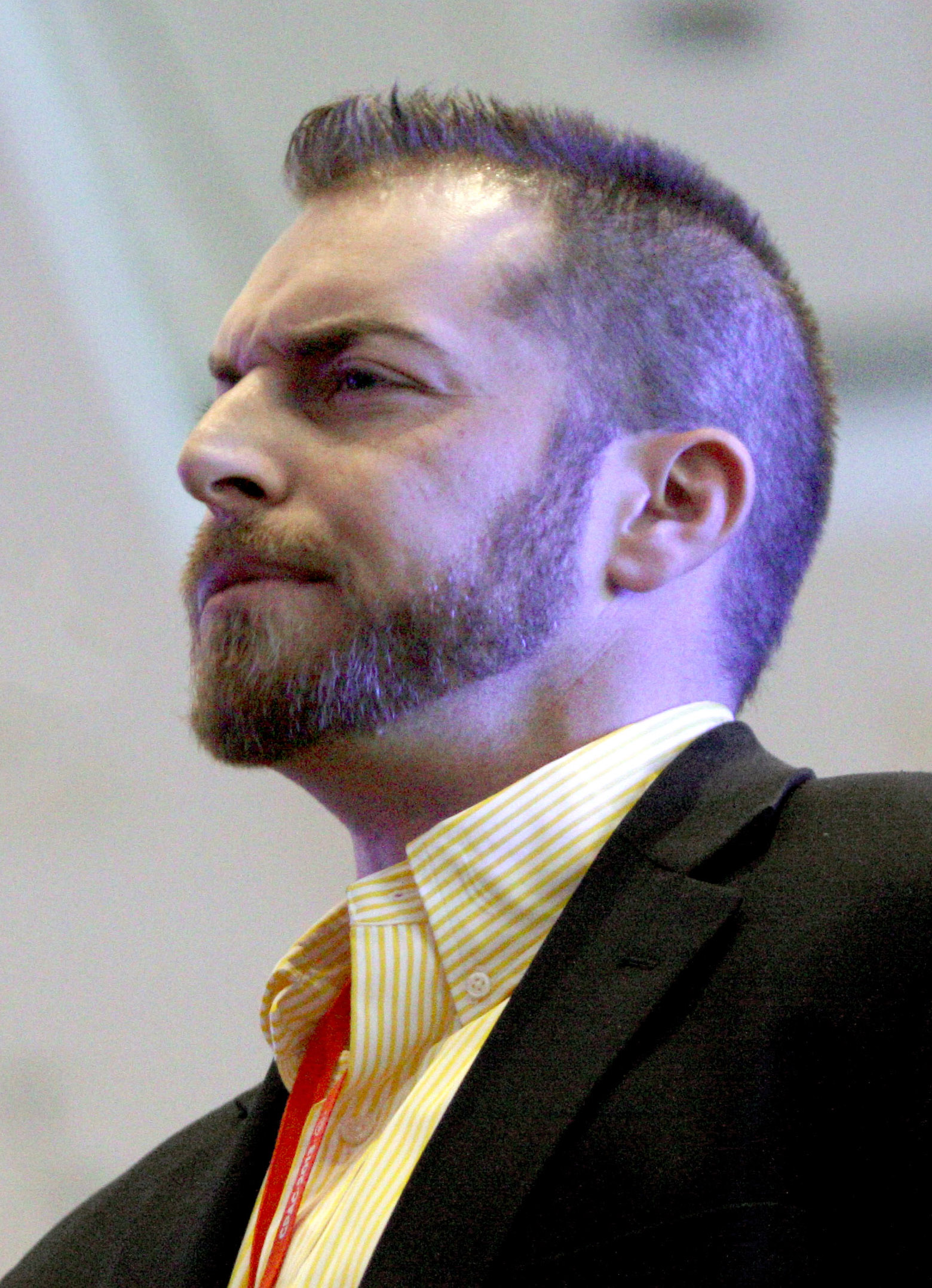

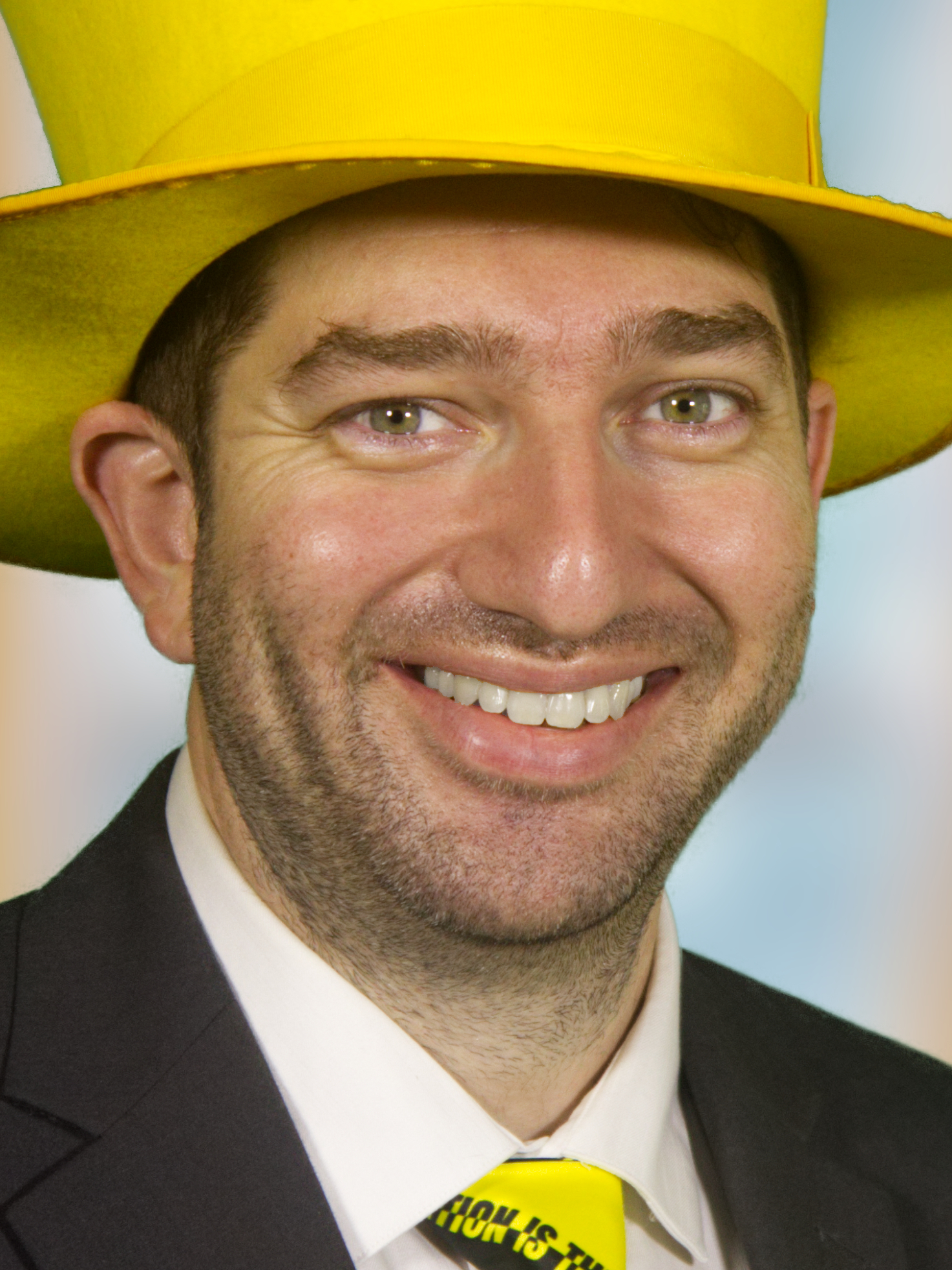
Candidate	Jacob Hornberger	Jo Jorgensen (Note: The primaries were non-binding. Despite not receiving a plurality of the popular vote and carrying only Nebraska (the New Mexico primary took place after the convention), Jorgensen was able to secure a majority of delegate votes at the convention, and thus the nomination.)	Vermin Supreme
Home state	Virginia	South Carolina	Massachusetts
Contests won	7	2	1
Popular vote	9,186	5,123	4,290
Percentage	20.3%	11.2%	9.4%
Candidate	None of the above	Ken Armstrong	Kim Ruff
Home state	–	Oregon	Arizona
Contests won	2	0	0
Popular vote	3,770	3,509	3,045
Percentage	8.3%	7.7%	6.7%
Candidate	Adam Kokesh	Dan Behrman
Home state	Indiana	Nevada
Contests won	0	0
Popular vote	2,865	2,398
Percentage	6.3%	5.3%

Jacob Hornberger
Jo Jorgensen
Vermin Supreme
No preference
Adam Kokesh
John Monds
Jim Gray
Justin Amash (undeclared)
Previous Libertarian nominee
Gary Johnson
Libertarian nominee
Jo Jorgensen

The 2020 Libertarian Party presidential primaries and caucuses were a series of electoral contests to indicate non-binding preferences for the Libertarian Party's presidential candidate in the 2020 United States presidential election. These differed from the Republican or Democratic presidential primaries and caucuses in that they do not appoint delegates to represent a candidate at the party's convention to select the party's presidential nominee.

The party's nominee was subsequently chosen directly by registered delegates at the 2020 Libertarian National Convention, held through an online convention from May 22 to May 24. Jo Jorgensen was chosen as the party's presidential nominee, becoming the first woman to receive the Libertarian nomination, after four rounds of voting. Spike Cohen was nominated for vice president.

== Background ==
The 2020 United States presidential election was the thirteenth contested presidential election in which the Libertarian Party participated. The 2016 election saw the highest vote total and percentage of votes for a Libertarian presidential ticket ever, with former New Mexico governor Gary Johnson and his running mate, former Massachusetts governor Bill Weld, receiving over four million votes and 3.3% of the total vote.

== Candidates ==
Major candidates have been invited to participate in at least two Libertarian Party-sponsored debates or have received substantial independent media coverage.

=== Nominee ===
Candidate	Born	Experience	Home state	Campaign	Popular vote	Contests won	Ref
Jo Jorgensen	May 1, 1957 (age 63); Libertyville, Illinois	Psychology senior lecturer at Clemson University; Nominee for Vice President in 1996; Nominee for U.S. representative from SC-04 in 1992	South Carolina	Campaign; November 2, 2019; FEC Filing; Nominated: May 23, 2020; Running mate: Spike Cohen (Note: Cohen was not personally chosen by Jorgensen, but was nominated separately by party delegates)	5,123 (11.2%)	2 (NE, NM)	

=== Eliminated in convention balloting ===
Candidate	Born	Experience	Home state	Campaign announced	Campaign suspended	Popular vote	Contests won	Ref
Jacob Hornberger	January 28, 1950 (age 70); Laredo, Texas	Founder and President of the Future of Freedom Foundation; Independent candidate for U.S. Senate from Virginia in 2002; Candidate for President in 2000	Virginia	October 29, 2019; FEC Filing; Running mate: Spike Cohen	May 23, 2020 (eliminated in balloting; endorsed Jorgensen after her nomination)	9,186 (20.3%)	7 (CA, CT, IA, MN, MO, NY, OH)	
Vermin Supreme	June 3, 1961 (age 58); Rockport, Massachusetts	Performance artist, activist, and political satirist Candidate for president in 1992, 1996, 2000, 2004, 2008, 2012, and 2016	Massachusetts	Campaign; June 26, 2019; FEC Filing; Running mate: Spike Cohen	May 23, 2020 (eliminated in balloting; endorsed Jorgensen after her nomination)	4,290 (9.4%)	1 (NH)	
Adam Kokesh	February 1, 1982 (age 38); San Francisco, California	Libertarian and anti-war political activist Nominee for U.S. Senate from Arizona in 2018; Republican candidate for U.S. representative from NM-03 in 2010	Indiana	January 18, 2018; FEC Filing; Running mate: Larry Sharpe (formerly John McAfee)	May 23, 2020 (eliminated in balloting; endorsed Jorgensen during balloting) (ran for vice-president)	2,865 (6.3%)	0	
Dan Behrman	April 24, 1981 (age 38); Los Angeles, California	Software engineer, internet personality and podcaster Nominee for Texas State Representative from the 125th district in 2014	Nevada	January 30, 2019; FEC Filing	May 23, 2020 (Eliminated in nomination round of convention; endorsed Supreme) (Running as an independent)	2,398 (5.3%)	0	
Sam Robb	January 2, 1969 (age 51); Pittsburgh, Pennsylvania	Software engineer and author Former naval officer	Pennsylvania	April 1, 2019; FEC Filing	May 23, 2020 (Eliminated during nomination round; endorsed Jorgensen)	1,954 (4.3%)	0	
Souraya Faas		Former member of the Miami-Dade County Republican Executive Committee; Independent candidate for president in 2016	Florida	May 3, 2019; FEC Filing	May 23, 2020 (eliminated during nomination round; endorsed Supreme)	1,170 (3.0%)	0	
Erik Gerhardt		Entrepreneur	Pennsylvania	May 23, 2019; FEC Filing	May 23, 2020 (eliminated during nomination round)	847 (2.2%)	0	
Keenan Dunham	July 16, 1981 (age 38); Myrtle Beach, South Carolina	Chair of the Horry County, South Carolina Libertarian Party; Candidate for President in 2016	South Carolina	August 26, 2018; FEC Filing	May 23, 2020 (eliminated during nomination round)	722 (1.9%)	0	
John McAfee	1945–2021; aged 75 years (at death) Forest of Dean, Gloucestershire, United Kingdom	Founder and CEO of McAfee, Inc. (1987–1994); Candidate for President in 2016	Tennessee	Campaign; June 3, 2018; Running mate: Adam Kokesh	March 4, 2020; Resumed: March 5, 2020; May 23, 2020 (eliminated during nomination round)	560 (1.5%)	0	
Arvin Vohra	May 9, 1979 (age 40); Silver Spring, Maryland	Vice Chair of the LNC (2014–2018); Nominee for U.S. Senate from Maryland in 2016 and 2018; Nominee for U.S. representative from MD-05 in 2012 and MD-04 in 2014	Maryland	July 3, 2018; FEC Filing	May 23, 2020 (eliminated during nomination round; endorsed Kokesh)	272 (0.7%)	0	
Kenneth Blevins		Pipe welder	Oklahoma	June 6, 2019; FEC Filing	May 23, 2020 (eliminated during nomination round)	122 (0.3%)	0	
John Monds	September 17, 1965 (age 54)	Former President of the Grady County, Georgia NAACP; Nominee for Governor of Georgia in 2010	Georgia	January 27, 2020; FEC Filing	May 23, 2020 (eliminated during balloting; endorsed Jorgensen during balloting) (ran for vice-president)	64 (0.2%)	0	
Jim Gray	February 14, 1945 (age 75); Washington, D.C.	Former presiding judge for the Superior Court of Orange County, California; Nominee for Vice President in 2012	California	April 13, 2020; Running mate: Larry Sharpe	May 23, 2020 (eliminated during balloting; endorsed Jorgensen during balloting)	42 (0.1%)	0	

=== Withdrew during the primaries ===
Candidate	Born	Experience	State	Campaign announced	Campaign suspended	Popular vote	Contests won	Campaign	Ref
Ken Armstrong	April 25, 1957 (age 63); Pasadena, California	U.S. Coast Guard commissioned officer (1977–1994); Former nonprofit executive Former member of the Honolulu County, Hawaii Neighborhood Board	Oregon	May 10, 2019	April 29, 2020 (Ran for Vice President) (Endorsed Amash)	3,509 (7.7%)	0	FEC Filing	
Mark Whitney		Podcaster and political satirist Founder and CEO of TheLaw.net; Nominee for Vermont State Senate in 1996	California	December 20, 2019	April 24, 2020 (Endorsed Gray)	10 (nil%)	0	Campaign; FEC Filing	
Lincoln Chafee	March 26, 1953 (age 67); Providence, Rhode Island	Governor of Rhode Island (2011–2015); U.S. Senator from Rhode Island (1999–2007); Mayor of Warwick, Rhode Island (1993–1999); Democratic candidate for President in 2016	Wyoming	January 5, 2020	April 5, 2020	441 (1.1%)	0	Campaign	
Max Abramson	April 29, 1976 (age 43); Kent, Washington	New Hampshire State Representative (2014–2016; 2018–present); Nominee for Governor of New Hampshire in 2016	New Hampshire	June 30, 2019	March 3, 2020 (Ran for Reform nomination and for Veterans' nomination)	2,040 (4.5%)	0	FEC Filing	
Kim Ruff	Peoria, Arizona	Vice chair of the LPRadical Caucus; Write-in candidate for Arizona State Mine Inspector in 2018	Arizona	March 25, 2019	January 11, 2020 (Endorsed Supreme)	3,045 (6.7%)	0	FEC Filing; Running mate: John Phillips Jr.	

=== Withdrew before the primaries ===
Candidate	Born	Experience	State	Campaign announced	Campaign suspended	Popular vote	Ref.
Joe Exotic	March 5, 1963 (aged 54); Garden City, Kansas	Zookeeper independent candidate for president in 2016	Oklahoma	January 13, 2017	June 1, 2017(ran for Governor of Oklahoma)	0 (Note: Candidate did not appear on any ballots.)	
Zoltan Istvan	March 30, 1973 (aged 45); Los Angeles, California	Transhumanist activist and futurist Candidate for Governor of California in 2018; Transhumanist nominee for President in 2016	California	November 25, 2017	January 11, 2019 (ran for Vice President)	0	

=== Formed exploratory committee but did not run ===
Candidate	Born	Experience	State	Exploratory committee announced	Exploratory committee disbanded	Popular vote	Contests won	Ref
Justin Amash	April 18, 1980 (age 46); Grand Rapids, Michigan	U.S. representative from MI-03 (2011–2021); Michigan State Representative from MI-72 (2009–2011)	Michigan	April 28, 2020	May 16, 2020	3 (nil%)	0	

=== Declined to be candidates ===
These individuals have been the subject of presidential speculation, but have publicly denied or recanted interest in running for president.

- Patrick Byrne, CEO and founder of Overstock.com from Indiana
- Tom Campbell, former U.S. Representative from California (1989–1993, 1995–2001) (endorsed Jim Gray)
- Kmele Foster, (Note: This individual is not a Libertarian Party member, but has been the subject of speculation and/or expressed interest in running under this party.) telecommunications entrepreneur and TV host from New York (endorsed Justin Amash)
- Gary Johnson, Republican Governor of New Mexico (1995–2003), nominee for president in 2012 and 2016, nominee for U.S. senator from New Mexico in 2018
- Thomas Massie, Republican U.S. representative from Kentucky (2012–present)
- Darryl W. Perry, radio host and candidate for President in 2016 (endorsed Kim Ruff)
- Austin Petersen, candidate for President in 2016, Republican candidate for U.S. Senate from Missouri in 2018
- Mary Ruwart, candidate for president in 1984 and 2008, candidate for vice president in 1992, nominee for U.S. Senate from Texas in 2000
- Mark Sanford, Republican U.S. representative from South Carolina (2013–2019) (ran for the Republican Party nomination)
- Nicholas Sarwark, attorney and chair of the Libertarian National Committee (2014–2020), candidate for Mayor of Phoenix in 2018
- Larry Sharpe, businessman, motivational speaker, and nominee for Governor of New York in 2018 (ran for Vice President)
- Jesse Ventura, Reform Governor of Minnesota (1999–2003) (considered running for Green Party nomination)
- Bill Weld, Republican Governor of Massachusetts (1991–1997) and nominee for Vice President in 2016 (ran for the Republican Party nomination)

== Timeline of the race ==
=== 2017 ===
- November 25: Zoltan Istvan announces his intention to run.

=== 2018 ===
- January 18: Adam Kokesh officially launches his campaign at an event in Texas, having already announced his intention to run for president during a jailhouse interview in 2013. On the day of his announcement, Kokesh was stopped twice by Texas state troopers, and placed under arrest and charged with possession of a controlled substance and tampering with evidence.
- May 28: Perennial candidate and performance artist Vermin Supreme files to run.
- June 3: Contrary to an assertion he made at the 2016 convention, John McAfee announces via Twitter that he would run for president again in 2020, either with the Libertarian Party or under the banner of a party of his own creation.
- July 3: Former Vice Chair of the Libertarian National Committee, Arvin Vohra announces his candidacy, after an unsuccessful bid for re-election to his position as vice chair.
- August 26: Chair of the Horry County Libertarian party and 2016 presidential candidate Keenan Dunham files to run.
- October 19: After having been asked during a Q&A session a few days prior if he would be interested in running for president as a Libertarian, Overstock.com CEO Patrick Byrne indicates that he "almost definitely" was not going to run for president in 2020.
- December 12: Vice chair of the L.P. Radical Caucus Kim Ruff expresses interest in a run.

=== 2019 ===
- January 3: Biomedical researcher and candidate for the party's 2008 presidential nomination Mary Ruwart confirmed on Twitter that she was not planning on seeking the nomination on 2020 in order to focus on writing.
- January 11: Zoltan Istvan announced via his website that he had left the Libertarian Party some time before this date, and was no longer seeking its presidential nomination in 2020.
- January 20: At-the-time Republican representative Justin Amash warns the Libertarian Party against nominating a "squishy Republican" at LibertyCon, a comment widely seen as directed at 2016 vice-presidential nominee and presumptive frontrunner Bill Weld.
- January 21: Former Starbucks CEO Howard Schultz, who had been suggested as a Libertarian candidate, makes clear that any presidential run by him would be as an independent.
- January 22: McAfee announces via Twitter that he would be continuing his campaign "in exile", following reports that he, his wife, and four of his campaign staff were being indicted for tax-related felonies by the Internal Revenue Service (IRS). McAfee indicated that he was in "international waters", and had previously tweeted that he was on his way to Venezuela. The IRS has not commented on the alleged indictments.
- January 23: McAfee confirmed on Twitter that he had docked in the Bahamas, where he would remain for the foreseeable future.
- January 30: Podcaster and software engineer Dan Behrman files to run.
- February 5: Weld, who had served as Gary Johnson's running mate in 2016, is the subject of rumours that he had left the Libertarian Party and rejoined the Republican Party to challenge Donald Trump in the Republican primary.
- February 15:
  - Weld confirmed that he had left the Libertarian Party on February 15 by announcing the formation of an exploratory committee for the Republican nomination. Weld officially launched his campaign for the Republican nomination on April 15.
  - Justin Amash declines to rule out running for the Libertarian nomination.
- April 1: Software engineer and former naval officer Sam Robb files to run.
- April 22: Larry Sharpe, who had been a candidate for vice president in 2016 and the nominee for Governor of New York in 2018, told The Niagara Gazette that he was unlikely to run for office in 2020, and was instead looking at running for Governor again in 2022.
- May 3: Souraya Faas files to run.
- May 10: Former U.S. Coast Guard officer Ken Armstrong announces his candidacy.
- May 18: Congressman Justin Amash broke ranks with the Republican Party and became the first Republican in all of Congress to call for impeachment proceedings against President Donald Trump. In an interview with Salon, Libertarian National Committee chairman Nicholas Sarwark concurred with Amash's conclusions, saying, "of all the members of Congress, his [Amash] positions seem to most closely match those of the Libertarian Party.", fuelling speculations about a possible bid by Amash for the Libertarian nomination On May 22, Sharpe reported receiving two calls from "people close to Amash" inquiring about the Libertarian Party.
- May 23: Entrepreneur Erik Gerhardt files to run.
- June 30: New Hampshire state representative Max Abramson announces his candidacy for the Libertarian nomination.
- July 4: Amash announces via an op-ed in The Washington Post that he had left the Republican Party, becoming an independent.
- August 22: Former Rhode Island governor Lincoln Chafee, who announced he had joined the Libertarian Party in a Boston Globe op-ed published in July, expressed interest in making another bid for the presidency, this time as a Libertarian.
- October 29: Founder and president of the Future of Freedom Foundation Jacob Hornberger filed to seek the Libertarian nomination for president, announcing his candidacy days later.
- November 2: At the South Carolina Libertarian Party convention, 1996 vice presidential nominee Jo Jorgensen announces her candidacy seeking the nomination for president. Jorgensen participated in the subsequent presidential debate held off the convention site.
- December 20: Podcaster and satirist Mark Whitney announces his campaign.

=== 2020 ===
- January 5: Former Governor and Senator Lincoln Chafee files to run.
- January 11:
  - Vermin Supreme wins the Libertarian Party of New Hampshire's internally-held and funded presidential preference primary.
  - Kim Ruff suspends her campaign.
- January 27: 2010 Georgia gubernatorial nominee John Monds files to run.
- February 8: Jacob Hornberger wins the Libertarian Party of Iowa's internally-held and funded presidential preference caucus.
- February 25: Jacob Hornberger wins the Libertarian Party of Minnesota's internally-held presidential preference caucus.
- March 3;
  - None of the above wins the North Carolina Libertarian presidential primary.
  - Jacob Hornberger wins the California Libertarian presidential primary.
  - Vermin Supreme wins the Massachusetts Libertarian presidential primary.
  - Max Abramson announces his departure from the Libertarian Party, ending his bid for the party's presidential nomination.
- March 4: John McAfee suspends his presidential campaign and announces his candidacy for the Libertarian vice-presidential nomination, endorsing Vermin Supreme for president.
- March 5: McAfee resumes his presidential campaign.
- March 10: Jacob Hornberger wins the unopposed Missouri primary.
- April 5: Lincoln Chafee suspends his campaign.
- April 11: Hornberger wins the Ohio caucus.
- April 13: Judge Jim Gray announces his candidacy, with Larry Sharpe as his running mate.
- April 24: Mark Whitney suspends his campaign and endorses Gray.
- April 26: In response to the COVID-19 pandemic, the JW Marriott Downtown Austin cancels all reservations for the 2020 Libertarian National Convention.
- April 28;
  - Hornberger wins the Connecticut primary.
  - Justin Amash opens a presidential exploratory committee for the Libertarian nomination.
- April 29: Ken Armstrong announces that he will withdraw from the presidential race and instead seek the nomination for vice president, following Amash's declaration for the Presidential nomination.
- May 9: The Libertarian Party of Kentucky sponsors the 5th in a series of televised debates held by the state party, featuring the top four vote-getting candidates from previous debates, Hornberger, Supreme, Jorgensen, and Jim Gray, plus Justin Amash.
- May 11: Ken Armstrong endorses Amash.
- May 12: Jo Jorgensen wins the Nebraska primary with 28% of the vote.
- May 16: Despite forming an exploratory committee, Justin Amash announces that he will not seek the 2020 presidential nomination.
- May 22: The 2020 Libertarian National Convention begins online, set to run digitally from May 22–24.
- May 23;
  - In the nominating round, Blevins, Vohra, McAfee, Dunham, Gerhardt, Faas, Robb, and Behrman are eliminated. Vohra endorses Kokesh, Robb endorses Jorgensen, and Faas and Behrman endorse Supreme. (Behrman nevertheless announces he will continue his presidential run as an independent.)
  - In subsequent rounds, Kokesh, Gray, Monds, Supreme, and Hornberger are eliminated. All of them subsequently endorse Jorgensen.
  - The Libertarian Party officially nominates Jo Jorgensen as its presidential candidate, making her the party's first female presidential nominee.
- May 24: The Libertarian Party nominates Spike Cohen as its vice presidential nominee.

=== Overview ===
Active campaign
Exploratory committee
Withdrawn candidate
Midterm elections
New Hampshire primary
Super Tuesday
COVID-19 pandemic national emergency declaration
Libertarian convention
Final primary
General election

== Endorsements ==
Jim Gray

Federal legislators

- Tom Campbell, former U.S. Representative from California (1989–1993, 1995–2001)

Statewide officials

- Gary Johnson, Republican Governor of New Mexico (1995–2003), nominee for president in 2012 and 2016, nominee for U.S. senator from New Mexico in 2018

Municipal officials

- Jeff Hewitt, member of the Riverside County Board of Supervisors (Previously endorsed Whitney)
Jacob Hornberger

Party officials

- John A. Buttrick, attorney and former chairman of the Libertarian Party of Arizona

Individuals

- Scott Horton, radio host and anti-war activist
- Tom Woods, historian and author
Adam Kokesh

Federal legislators

- Cynthia McKinney, former U.S. Representative from Georgia (1997–2003, 2005–2007), Green nominee for President in 2008

Party officials

- Arvin Vohra, Vice Chair of the Libertarian National Committee (2014-2018)
Vermin Supreme

State legislators

- Caleb Q. Dyer, former New Hampshire State Representative from Hillsborough District 37 (2017–2019)
- Brandon Phinney, former New Hampshire State Representative from Strafford District 24 (2017–2019) (Previously endorsed Ruff)

Individuals

- Rob Potylo, musician and comedian
- Lord Buckethead, satirical parliamentary candidate from the United Kingdom
Justin Amash

State legislators

- Laura Ebke, former Nebraska state senator (2015–2019)

Individuals

- Kmele Foster, telecommunications entrepreneur and TV host
- Nick Gillespie, political writer and editor-at-large for Reason
- Jack Hunter, political commentator and editor for Rare.us
- Jeff Jacoby, political columnist for The Boston Globe
- Matt K. Lewis, political writer and columnist for The Daily Beast and The Week
- Mark Pellegrino, actor
Lincoln Chafee

Individuals

- Steve Kerbel, businessman, author, and candidate for President in 2016
- James P. Gray, Former presiding judge for the Superior Court of Orange County, California, Nominee for Vice-President in 2012 (Later ran for President)
Kim Ruff

State legislators

- Brandon Phinney, former New Hampshire State Representative from Strafford District 24 (2017–2019) (Later endorsed Supreme)
Mark Whitney

Municipal officials

- Jeff Hewitt, member of the Riverside County Board of Supervisors

== Primaries and caucuses ==
The Libertarian Party participated in presidential primaries in numerous states.

- January 11: The Libertarian Party of New Hampshire announced the results of its party-funded presidential preference primary, conducted by mail and in-person at the state convention through January 10.
- February 8: The Libertarian Party of Iowa conducted its own caucuses.
- February 25: The Libertarian Party of Minnesota conducted its own caucuses a week before that of the Democratic and Republican primaries in Minnesota.
- March 3: California, Massachusetts, and North Carolina primaries
- March 10: Missouri primary
- March 16–April 11: The Libertarian Party of Ohio conducted its own online caucuses.
- April 18-May 1: The Libertarian Party of Maine conducted its own online convention.
- April 25–28: The Libertarian Party of Connecticut conducted its own online primary.
- April 28: New York primary
- May 12: Nebraska primary
- May 22: 2020 Libertarian National Convention
- June 2: New Mexico primary

=== Other primaries and caucuses ===
- Cancellations: Arizona

=== Ballot access ===
Primaries and Caucuses
State/ Territory	Date	Behrman	Dunham	Hornberger	Jorgensen	Kokesh	McAfee	Robb	Supreme	Vohra	Armstrong	Whitney	Chafee	Abramson	Ruff	Other	Reference
NH (Note: Primary/caucus is held internally by the state party and not a state sanctioned election.)	January 11	Yes	Yes	No	Yes	No	No	Yes	Yes	Yes	Yes	No	No	No	Yes	Yes (Note: Erik Gerhardt, Arlen Lawson Wright)	
IA	February 8	No official candidate list															
MN	February 25	Yes	Yes	Yes	Yes	Yes	No	Yes	Yes	Yes	Yes	Yes	Yes	No	No	Yes (Note: Sorinne Ardeleanu, Souraya Faas, Steve Richey)	
CA	March 3	Yes	Yes	Yes	Yes	Yes	No	Yes	Yes	No	Yes	No	No	Yes	Withdrawn	Yes (Note: Souraya Faas, Erik Gerhardt, Steve Richey)	
MA	March 3	Yes	No	Yes	Yes	Yes	No	Yes	Yes	Yes	Yes	No	No	Yes	Withdrawn	No	
NC	March 3	Yes	No	Yes	Yes	Yes	Yes	No	Yes	Yes	Yes	No	No	Yes	Withdrawn	Yes (Note: Kenneth Blevins, Souraya Faas, Erik Gerhardt, Jedi Hill, James Ogle, Steve Richey)	
MO	March 10	No	No	Yes	No	No	No	No	No	No	No	No	No	No	No	No	
OH	March 16	Yes	No	Yes	Yes	Yes	No	No	Yes	No	Yes	Yes	Yes	No	No	Yes (Note: Steve Richey)	
CT	April 28	Yes	Yes	Yes	Yes	Yes	Yes	Yes	Yes	Yes	Yes	Withdrawn	Withdrawn	No	No	Yes (Note: Brian Ellison, Erik Gerhardt, James Ogle, Jedediah Hill, John Monds, Kenneth Blevins, Louis Vanacore, Phil Gray, Rhett Smith, Sorinne Ardeleanu, Steve Richey)	
NY	April 28	No	No	Yes	No	No	No	No	No	No	No	No	No	No	No	No	
NE	May 12	Yes	No	Yes	Yes	Yes	No	No	No	No	No	No	Withdrawn	Withdrawn	No	No	
NM	June 2	Yes	No	Yes	Yes	Yes	No	Yes	No	Yes	Withdrawn	Withdrawn	Withdrawn	Withdrawn	No	Yes (Note: Sorinne Ardeleanu, John Monds, James Ogle)	

Candidates listed in italics have suspended their campaigns.

== Results ==
Date	Contest	2020 Libertarian Party presidential primaries (Note: In the below table, blank cells indicate the candidate was not a ballot option or approved write-in candidate. Shaded cells indicate withdrawn candidates.)												Source
Date	Contest	Jo Jorgensen	Jacob Hornberger	Vermin Supreme	Adam Kokesh	Dan Behrman	Sam Robb	Ken Armstrong	Kim Ruff	Max Abramson	None of the above	Others	Total	Source
January 11	New; Hampshire	17 (12.1%)	9 (6.4%)	26 (18.6%)	1 (0.7%)	13 (9.3%)	8 (5.7%)	5 (3.6%)	22 (15.7%)	1 (0.7%)	13 (9.3%)	25 (Note: Mark Whitney: 6 (4.3%), Arvin Vohra: 6 (4.3%), Lincoln Chafee: 4 (2.9%), Justin Amash: 3 (2.1%), Keenan Dunham: 2 (1.4%), "Straw Poll": 1 (0.7%), Joe Bishop-Henchman: 1 (0.7%), Thomas Knapp: 1 (0.7%), Nicholas Sarwark: 1 (0.7%)) (17.7%)	140	
February 8	Iowa	18 (6.4%)	133 (47.3%)	9 (3.2%)	17 (6.1%)	14 (5.0%)	7 (2.5%)	2 (0.7%)		6 (2.1%)	8 (2.9%)	67 (Note: Lincoln Chafee: 36 (12.8%), John McAfee: 10 (3.7%), Write-in: 8 (2.9%), Mark Whitney: 4 (1.4%), Arvin Vohra: 3 (1.1%), Keenan Dunham: 2 (0.7%), Souraya Faas: 2 (0.7%), Benjamin Leder: 1 (0.4%), John Monds: 1 (0.4%)) (23.8%)	281	
February 25	Minnesota	32 (40.5%)	47 (59.5%)	eliminated	eliminated	eliminated in round 1/7	eliminated	eliminated		eliminated	eliminated		79	
March 3 (Super Tuesday)	California	3,534 (12.4%)	5,530 (19.4%)	3,469 (12.2%)	2,161 (7.6%)	1,695 (5.9%)	1,722 (6.0%)	3,011 (10.6%)	2,330 (8.2%)	1,605 (5.6%)		3,478 (12.2%)	28,535	
March 3 (Super Tuesday)	Massachusetts	141 (3.4%)	369 (8.9%)	399 (9.6%)	125 (3.0%)	294 (7.%)	127 (3.1%)	145 (3.5%)	224 (5.4%)	98 (2.4%)	804 (19.3%)	1,433 (34.5%)	4,159	
March 3 (Super Tuesday)	North; Carolina	267 (4.4%)	584 (9.6%)	387 (6.3%)	163 (2.7%)	144 (2.4%)		346 (5.7%)	469 (7.7%)	160 (2.7%)	2,022 (33.1%)	1,568 (25.7%)	6,110	
March 10	Missouri		1,695 (74.8%)								571 (25.2%)		2,266	
March 16-April 11	Ohio	55 (31.6%)	97 (55.7%)	eliminated in round 8/9	eliminated in round 5/9	eliminated in round 2/9		eliminated in round 7/9			22 (12.6%)		174	
April 25-28	Connecticut	eliminated in round 18/19	85 (50.9%)	eliminated in round 16/19	eliminated in round 17/19	eliminated in round 12/19	eliminated in round 10/19	eliminated in round 7/19			eliminated in round 13/19	82 (49.1%)	167	
April 28	New; York		default winner											
May 12	Nebraska	539 (28.1%)	483 (25.2%)		274 (14.3%)	180 (9.4%)				170 (8.9%)		270 (14.1%)	1,916	
June 2	New Mexico (Note: The New Mexico primary was delayed due to the COVID-19 pandemic, and was therefore held after Jo Jorgensen received the Libertarian Party nomination on May 23.)	520 (33.1%)	154 (9.8%)		124 (7.9%)	58 (3.7%)	90 (5.7%)				330 (21.0%)	281 (18.1%)	1,557	
Popular vote (Percentage)		5,123 (11.2%)	9,186 (20.3%)	4,290 (9.4%)	2,865 (6.3%)	2,398 (5.3%)	1,954 (4.3%)	3,509 (7.7%)	3,045 (6.7%)	2,040 (4.5%)	3,770 (8.3%)		45,389	

== Debates and forums ==
=== Schedule ===
Sites of the Libertarian Party presidential debates.

No.	Date	Time (ET)	Place	Sponsor(s)	Moderators	Ref
1	March 31, 2019		Holiday Inn Seattle–Issaquah, Issaquah, Washington	Libertarian Party of Washington	Randy McGlenn II	
2	April 13, 2019		Courtyard by Marriott Bay City, Bay City, Michigan	Libertarian Party of Michigan	Jeff Wood	
3	April 27, 2019		Hotel Eleganté Conference & Event Center, Colorado Springs, Colorado	Libertarian Party of Colorado	–	
4	May 5, 2019	1–2 pm	Hotel Alba Tampa-Westshore, Tampa, Florida	Libertarian Party of Florida	C. Michael Pickens	
5	June 1, 2019		Radisson Hotel at The University of Toledo, Toledo, Ohio	Libertarian Party of Ohio	Larry Sharpe	
6	July 13, 2019		VFW Post 529 – George Dilboy Post, Somerville, Massachusetts	Libertarian Party of Massachusetts	Matt Welch	
7	November 2, 2019	7–9 pm	Francis Marion University, Florence, South Carolina	Libertarian Party of South Carolina	Matt Welch	
8	November 9, 2019	7–9 pm	Olean High School, Olean, New York	Cattaraugus County Libertarian Party	James Weeks II, Daniel Donnelly, and Luke Wenke	
9	January 11, 2020		Holiday Inn, Concord, New Hampshire	Libertarian Party of New Hampshire	Daniel Fishman	
10	January 18, 2020		Douglasville Convention Center, Douglasville, Georgia	Libertarian Party of Georgia	Jessica Szilagyi	
11	February 16, 2020	10 pm–12 am	DoubleTree by Hilton Hotel Los Angeles, Culver City, California	Libertarian Party of California	Matt Welch	
12	February 22, 2020		Holiday Inn & Suites, Orlando, Florida	Libertarian Party of Florida		
13	February 28, 2020	6:30–9 pm	Birmingham Marriott, Birmingham, Alabama	Libertarian Party of Alabama	TBD	
14	March 7, 2020		Renaissance Philadelphia Airport Hotel, Philadelphia, Pennsylvania	Libertarian Party of Pennsylvania	Larry Sharpe	
15	March 13, 2020	9:15–11:30 pm	Embassy Suites East Peoria, East Peoria, Illinois	Libertarian Party of Illinois	TBD	
16	April 17, 2020		McAllen Convention Center, McAllen, Texas	Libertarian Party of Texas	TBD	
17	April 23, 2020		Online	Libertarian Party of Kentucky	Chris Wiest	
18	May 2, 2020		Online	Libertarian Party of Kentucky	Chris Wiest	
19	May 9, 2020		Online	Libertarian Party of Kentucky	Chris Wiest	
20	May 16, 2020		Online	Libertarian Party of Kentucky; Libertarian Party of Missouri	Matt Welch	
21	May 18, 2020		Online	Libertarian Party of Texas	Timothy Martinez	
22	May 21, 2020		Online	Libertarian Party National Convention	John Stossel	

=== Debates ===
Libertarian Party-sponsored debates among candidates for the 2020 Libertarian Party U.S. presidential nomination
Date	Place	Host	Participants															
P Participant. I Invitee. A Absent. N Confirmed non-invitee. O Out of race (exploring, suspended, or not yet entered)			Abramson	Amash	Armstrong	Behrman	Chafee	Gray	Hornberger	Jorgensen	Kokesh	Monds	Robb	Ruff	Supreme	Vohra	Whitney	others
March 31, 2019	Issaquah, Washington	Libertarian Party of Washington	O	O	O	A	O	O	O	O	P	O	O	A	A	P	O	none
April 13, 2019	Bay City, Michigan	Libertarian Party of Michigan	O	O	O	A	O	O	O	O	A	O	A	A	P	P	O	Marks
April 27, 2019	Colorado Springs, Colorado	Libertarian Party of Colorado	O	O	O	A	O	O	O	O	P	O	A	A	P	P	O	none
May 5, 2019	Tampa, Florida	Libertarian Party of Florida	O	O	O	P	O	O	O	O	P	O	A	A	A	P	O	Faas
June 1, 2019	Toledo, Ohio	Libertarian Party of Ohio	O	O	O	A	O	O	O	O	P	O	A	P	P	P	O	Marks
July 13, 2019	Somerville, Massachusetts	Libertarian Party of Massachusetts	P	O	O	P	O	O	O	O	P	O	A	P	A	P	O	none
November 2, 2019	Florence, South Carolina	Libertarian Party of South Carolina	N	O	P	P	O	O	N	P	P	O	N	P	P	N	O	none
November 9, 2019	Olean, New York	Cattaraugus County Libertarian Party	P	O	P	P	O	O	A	A	A	O	P	A	P	P	O	Christmann; Hill
January 11, 2020	Concord, New Hampshire	Libertarian Party of New Hampshire	P	O	A	P	A (Note: Chafee addressed the convention before the debate.)	O	A	P	A	O	P	A	P	P	P	Ashby; Dunham; Gerhardt
January 18, 2020	Douglasville, Georgia	Libertarian Party of Georgia	A	O	A	P	P	O	A	P	P	O	P	O	P	A	P	Blevins; Gerhardt
February 16, 2020	Culver City, California	Libertarian Party of California	N	O	N	N	P	O	P	P	P	N	N	O	P	N	P	none
February 22, 2020	Orlando, Florida	Libertarian Party of Florida	A	O	A	P	P	O	P	P	P	P	A	O	P	P	P	none
February 28, 2020	Birmingham, Alabama	Libertarian Party of Alabama	A	O	A	P	P	O	P	P	P	P	A	O	A	P	P	none
March 7, 2020	Philadelphia, Pennsylvania	Libertarian Party of Pennsylvania	O	O	P	A	A	O	P	P	P	A	A	O	P	A	A	none
March 13, 2020	East Peoria, Illinois	Libertarian Party of Illinois	O	O	P	P	A	O	P	P	P	P	P	O	P	A	A	Blevins; Williams
April 17, 2020	McAllen, Texas	Libertarian Party of Texas	O	O	N	I	O	N	I	I	I	I	N	O	I	N	I	none
April 22, 2020	Online	Libertarian Party of Kentucky	O	O	A	A	O	P	P	P	P	A	A	O	A	A	P	none
May 2, 2020	Online	Libertarian Party of Kentucky	O	A	O	A	O	P	P	P	N	P	N	O	P	N	O	none
May 9, 2020	Online	Libertarian Party of Kentucky	O	P	O	N	O	P	P	P	N	N	N	O	P	N	O	none
May 16, 2020	Online	Libertarian Party of Kentucky; Libertarian Party of Missouri	O	A	O	N	O	P	P	P	P	P	N	O	N	N	O	none
May 18, 2020	Online	Libertarian Party of Texas	O	O	O	P	O	P	P	P	P	P	A	O	P	A	O	none
May 21, 2020	Online	Libertarian Party National Convention	O	O	O	N	O	P	P	P	N	P	N	O	P	N	O	none

=== Forums ===
Forums among candidates for the 2020 Libertarian Party U.S. presidential nomination
Date	Place	Host	Participants									
P Participant. A Absent. O Out of race (exploring, suspended, or not yet entered)			Armstrong	Behrman	Chafee	Hornberger	Jorgensen	Kokesh	Robb	Supreme	Whitney	others
September 23, 2019	Dayton, Ohio	Libertarian Party of Ohio	P	A	O	O	O	A	A	P	O	Faas
January 25, 2020	Tucson, Arizona	Libertarian Party of Arizona	P	P	A	P	P	P	A	P	P	none
February 29, 2020	Des Moines, Iowa	Libertarian Party of Iowa	P	P	P	P	P	P	P	A	P	none

== Primary election polling ==
=== National polling of delegates to the Convention ===
Both of these polls were conducted using ranked choice voting, progression down the table indicates later rounds of voting as the candidate with the lowest total is eliminated.

Poll source	Sample size	Date(s)	Amash	Gray	Hornberger	Jorgensen	Kokesh	Monds	Supreme	Others
OpaVote	Released May 19, 2020	350 (V) (Note: Ranked Choice Voting)	– (Note: Without Amash)	17.4%	22.9%	22%	7.7%	9.1%	12.6%	8.3 (Note: None of the Above with 3.7%; Vohra with 2.3%; Behrman with 1.4%; Robb with 0.9%; Brian Ellison with no votes) (Note: No votes exhausted)
OpaVote	Released May 19, 2020	350 (V)	–	17.4%	22.9%	22%	7.7%	9.1%	12.6%	8.3 (Note: None of the Above with 3.7%; Vohra with 2.3%; Behrman with 1.4%; Robb with 0.9%)
OpaVote	Released May 19, 2020	350 (V)	–	17.7%	23.1%	22.3%	7.7%	9.1%	12.6%	7.4% (Note: None of the Above with 3.7%; Vohra with 2.3%; Behrman with 1.4%)
OpaVote	Released May 19, 2020	350 (V)	–	17.7%	23.4%	22.3%	7.7%	9.7%	12.9%	6.3% (Note: None of the Above with 3.7%; Vohra with 2.6%)
OpaVote	Released May 19, 2020	350 (V)	–	17.7%	24.0%	22.3%	8.6%	10%	13.7%	3.7% (Note: None of the Above with 3.7%)
OpaVote	Released May 19, 2020	350 (V)	–	19.2%	24.4%	23%	8.8%	10.5%	14.2%	– (Note: 6 votes exhausted)
OpaVote	Released May 19, 2020	350 (V)	–	20.4%	25.7%	26%	–	11.5%	16.3%	– (Note: 12 votes exhausted)
OpaVote	Released May 19, 2020	350 (V)	–	22%	27.6%	31.8%	–	–	18.7%	– (Note: 13 votes exhausted)
OpaVote	Released May 19, 2020	350 (V)	–	26.5%	32.4%	41.1%	–	–	–	– (Note: 29 votes exhausted)
OpaVote	Released May 19, 2020	350 (V)	–	–	39.5%	60.5%	–	–	–	– (Note: 46 votes exhausted)
OpaVote	Released May 19, 2020	350 (V)	36.2%	6.1%	17.1%	12.8%	7%	5.5%	9.9%	5.4% (Note: Vohra with 2.3%; None of the Above with 1.4%; Behra and Robb with 0.9%; Brian Ellison with no votes)
OpaVote	Released May 19, 2020	350 (V)	36.2%	6.1%	17.1%	12.8%	7%	5.5%	9.9%	5.4% (Note: Vohra with 2.3%; None of the Above with 1.4%; Behra and Robb with 0.9%)
OpaVote	Released May 19, 2020	350 (V)	36.2%	6.1%	17.4%	12.8%	7%	5.5%	10.1%	4.9% (Note: Vohra with 2.3%; None of the Above with 1.4%; Robb with 1.2%)
OpaVote	Released May 19, 2020	350 (V)	36.2%	6.4%	18%	13%	7%	5.5%	10.1%	3.7% (Note: Vohra with 2.3%; None of the Above with 1.4%)
OpaVote	Released May 19, 2020	350 (V)	36.8%	6.7%	18.1%	13.2%	7%	5.6%	10.2%	2.3% (Note: Vohra with 2.3%) (Note: 3 votes exhausted)
OpaVote	Released May 19, 2020	350 (V)	37.1%	6.7%	18.7%	13.2%	7.6%	5.8%	10.8%	–
OpaVote	Released May 19, 2020	350 (V)	37.7%	7%	19.9%	15.2%	7.9%	–	12.3%	–
OpaVote	Released May 19, 2020	350 (V)	39.4%	–	20.6%	19.1%	8.2%	–	12.6%	– (Note: 5 votes exhausted)
OpaVote	Released May 19, 2020	350 (V)	41.1%	–	21.9%	22.2%	–	–	14.7%	–
OpaVote	Released May 19, 2020	350 (V)	44.9%	–	25.6%	29.4%	–	–	–	–
OpaVote	Released May 19, 2020	350 (V)	52.8%	–	–	47.2%	–	–	–	– (Note: 40 votes exhausted)

== Campaign finance ==
This is an overview of the money used by each campaign as it is reported to the Federal Election Commission (FEC) and released on October 15, 2019. Totals raised include loans from the candidate and transfers from other campaign committees. Some of the Libertarian candidates have not filed with the FEC, and financial data for those candidates are therefore not available.

Withdrawn candidate

Candidate	Total raised	Individual contributions			Debt	Spent	COH
Candidate	Total raised	Total	Unitemized	Pct	Debt	Spent	COH
Jorgensen	$32,148	$22,365	$7,615	34.1%	$9,874	$30,257	$1,891
Abramson	filed Statement of Candidacy						
Armstrong (Note: Armstrong's most recent financial report was for the period ending December 31, 2019.)	$20,360	$16,608	$4,909	29.6%	$1,867	$17,054	$734
Behrman	$42,064	$7,767	$1,500	17.2%	$18,660	$42,064	$0
Chafee	$62,546	$2,496	$1,996	80.0%	$0	$50,119	$12,427
Dunham	filed Statement of Candidacy						
Gerhardt	filed Statement of Candidacy						
Hornberger	$65,420	$42,079	$23,140	55.0%	$44,770	$3,797	$20,650
Kokesh	$218,770	$112,070	$14,929	13.3%	$13,742	$218,694	$76
Marks	filed Statement of Candidacy						
McAfee	did not file						
Robb	filed Statement of Candidacy						
Ruff (Note: Ruff's most recent financial report was for the period ending September 30, 2019.)	$18,958	$9,812	$2,363	37.5%	$6,117	$9,264	$9,695
Supreme (Note: Supreme's most recent financial report was for the period ending September 30, 2019.)	$32,049	$28,794	$18,535	64.4%	$700	$29,407	$2,642
Vohra	filed Statement of Candidacy						
Whitney	$67,001	$5,600	$575	9.3%	$60,726	$2,998	$64,028

== See also ==
- 2020 United States presidential election

National Conventions

- 2020 Libertarian National Convention
- 2020 Republican National Convention
- 2020 Democratic National Convention
- 2020 Green National Convention
- 2020 Constitution Party National Convention

Presidential primaries

- 2020 Republican Party presidential primaries
- 2020 Democratic Party presidential primaries
- 2020 Green Party presidential primaries
- 2020 Constitution Party presidential primaries
