= Kmele Foster =

American entrepreneur and political commentator

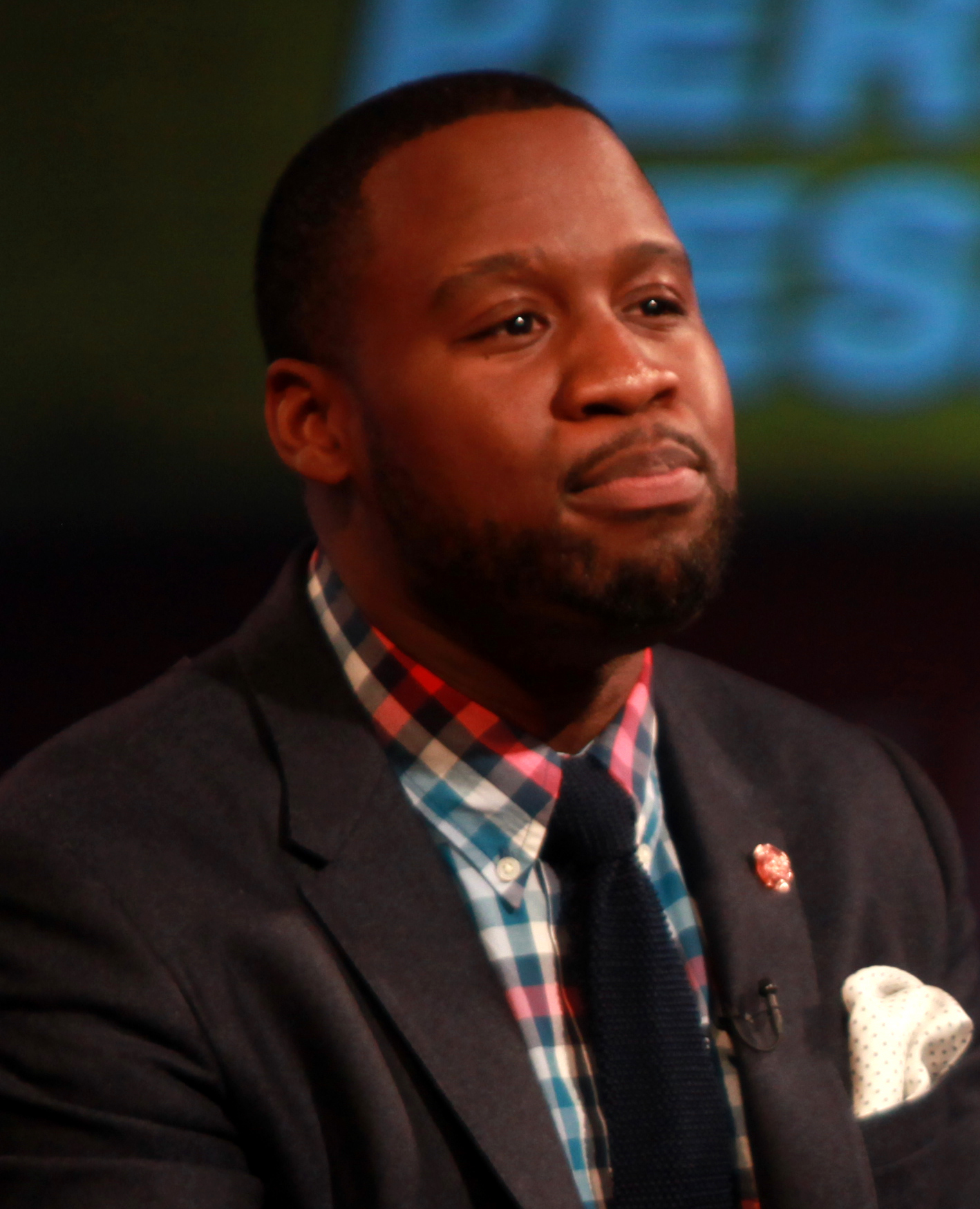
- Born: October 31, 1980 (age 46)

Kmele Foster (born October 31, 1980) is an American telecommunications entrepreneur and political commentator. He is co-founder and vice president of the telecommunications consultancy TelcoIQ and is currently a co-host of the podcast The Fifth Column.

Foster is the former chairman of the America's Future Foundation, a non-profit political activist organization based out of Washington, D.C. He was the co-host of the Fox Business Network program The Independents, along with Reason magazine editor Matt Welch and Kennedy host Lisa Kennedy Montgomery. He is now the lead producer at the media company Freethink.

Foster endorsed Justin Amash in the 2020 Libertarian Party presidential primaries.

Foster was the emcee at the inaugural gala for the Foundation for Individual Rights and Expression (FIRE), on whose board of directors he serves, in New York City in April 2023.
