= Nicholas Sarwark =

19th chair of the Libertarian National Committee

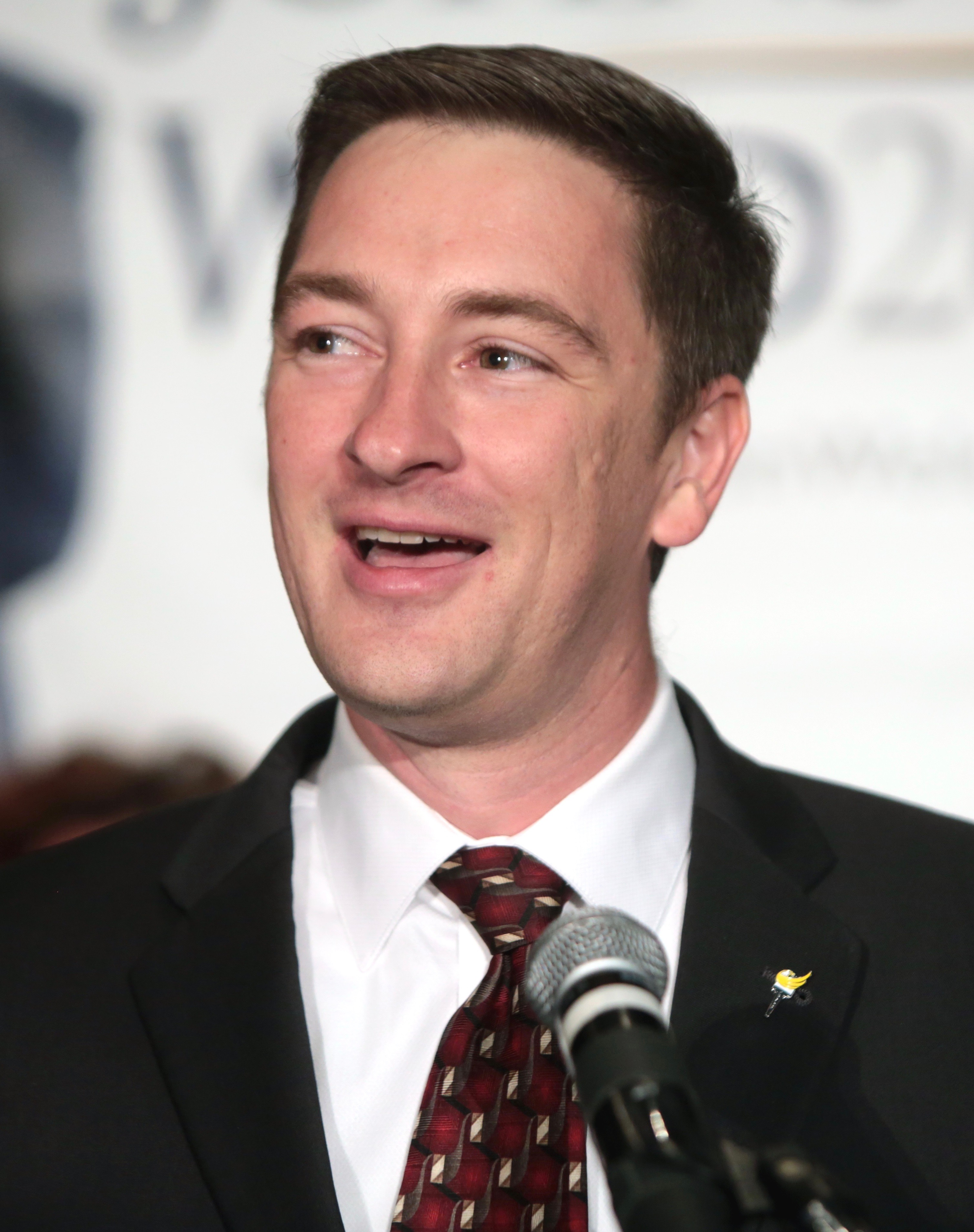
- Sarwark in 2016

19th Chair of the Libertarian National Committee
- In office June 29, 2014 – July 11, 2020
- Preceded by: Geoff Neale
- Succeeded by: Joe Bishop-Henchman

Vice Chair of the Libertarian Party of Colorado
- In office 2009–2014
- Preceded by: Wayne Harlos
- Succeeded by: Eric Mulder

Chair of the Libertarian Party of Maryland
- In office 2001–2003
- Preceded by: Steve Boone
- Succeeded by: Chip Spangler

Personal details
- Born: Nicholas Joel Sarwark; August 27, 1979 (age 47) Phoenix, Arizona, U.S.
- Party: Libertarian
- Other political affiliations: Democratic (2022)
- Spouse: Valerie Sarwark (m. 2009)
- Children: 4
- Education: Washington Adventist University (BS); American University (JD)
- Website: Official website

Nicholas Joel Sarwark (born August 27, 1979) is an American attorney and businessman who served as the 19th chair of the Libertarian National Committee (LNC), the governing body of the Libertarian Party. Prior to his election in 2014, he served on several LP national committees and as chair of the Libertarian Party of Maryland State Committee and vice chair of the Libertarian Party of Colorado State Committee. As of 2020, he is the only LP chair to have served three consecutive terms.

Sarwark declined to run for another term as LNC chair in 2020, and was succeeded by Joe Bishop-Henchman.

== Early life and education ==
Sarwark was born on August 27, 1979, in Phoenix, Arizona. He graduated from Washington Adventist University in 1998 with a BS in computer science and a minor in philosophy, later receiving his juris doctor from American University's Washington College of Law in 2008. While attending law school, Sarwark clerked for the libertarian law firm Institute for Justice.

In the early 1990s, Sarwark's father brought him to Maricopa County Libertarian gatherings, and Sarwark subsequently joined the party in 1999.

== Political career and campaigns ==
Sarwark was chairman of the Libertarian Party of Maryland from 2001 to 2003, holding numerous LP officer and local-level roles there. Prior to being elected chairman of the Libertarian National Committee in 2014, Sarwark served as a deputy public defender in Colorado and as vice-chairman of the Libertarian Party of Colorado. He was re-elected in 2016, and again in 2018.

While serving as LNC chair, Sarwark made appearances on multiple national media outlets, including MSNBC and NPR, to discuss libertarian perspectives on various topics.

Sarwark ran in the 2018 Phoenix mayoral special election. His campaign platform included opposition to light rail, addressing the city's pension debt, and working with Republicans and Democrats on the city council. He garnered 10.5 percent of the vote, placing fourth among four candidates, and did not advance to the 2019 run-off.

After moving to New Hampshire, Sarwark ran for Hillsborough County Attorney in 2020 under the Libertarian Party. His major issues included clearing the criminal case backlog. He received 5.6 percent of the vote, placing third among three candidates. Sarwark ran for the same office in 2022 under both the Libertarian and Democratic parties. He placed second in a two-candidate race with 45.25 percent of the vote.

== Personal life ==
Sarwark married his wife, Valerie in 2009. After building a family in Denver, he returned to Phoenix in 2014 to join his family's independent car dealership, where he served as vice-president. Sarwark and his wife have four children. In 2019, Sarwark and his family moved to Manchester, New Hampshire, to become a part of the grassroots libertarian movement the Free State Project.

== Electoral history ==
2014 Libertarian National Committee chair election
Round 1
Candidate	Votes	%
Nicholas Sarwark	161	40.7
Geoff Neale (incumbent)	135	34.1
Brett Pojunis	66	16.7
None of the above	31	7.8
Starchild (write-in)	3	nil
Total votes	396	100%
Round 2
Nicholas Sarwark	194	51.3
Geoff Neale (incumbent)	144	38.1
None of the above	40	10.6
Total votes	378	100%

2016 Libertarian National Committee chair election
Round 1
Candidate	Votes	%
Nicholas Sarwark (incumbent)	464	64.7
Brett Pojunis	135	18.8
Mark Rutherford	108	15.1
None of the above (write-in)	5	nil
James Weeks (write-in)	2	nil
Trey Waites (write-in)	1	nil
Brett Bittner (write-in)	1	nil
Vermin Supreme (write-in)	1	nil
Total votes	717	100%

2018 Libertarian National Committee chair election
Round 1
Candidate	Votes	%
Nicholas Sarwark (incumbent)	517	65.4
Joshua Smith	175	22.2
Christopher Thrasher	46	5.8
None of the above	33	4.2
Matthew Kuehnel	13	1.6
John Keil	4	nil
Matthew Schutter	1	nil
Arvin Hammer (write-in)	1	nil
Dan Behrman	0	nil
Total votes	790	100%

2018–19 Phoenix mayoral special election
1st round
Candidate	Votes	%
Kate Gallego	171,035	44.5
Daniel Valenzuela	100,998	26.3
Moses Sanchez	71,121	18.5
Nicholas Sarwark	40,218	10.5
Write-in	1,082	nil
Total votes	384,454	100%

2020 Hillsborough County attorney election
Party	Candidate	Votes	%
Republican	John Coughlin	105,491	49.4
Democratic	Michael Conlon (incumbent)	95,948	44.9
Libertarian	Nicholas Sarwark	11,982	5.6
Write-in		105	nil
Total votes		213,526	100%
Republican gain from Democratic			

2022 Hillsborough County attorney election
Party	Candidate	Votes	%
Republican	John Coughlin (incumbent)	87,004	54.75
Democratic	Nicholas Sarwark	71,904	45.25
Total votes		128,908	100%
Republican hold			

Party political offices
Preceded by Steve Boone	Chair of the Libertarian Party of Maryland; 2001–2003	Succeeded by Chip Spangler
Preceded by Wayne Harlos	Vice Chair of the Libertarian Party of Colorado; 2009–2014	Succeeded by Eric Mulder
Preceded by Geoff Neale	Chair of the Libertarian National Committee; 2014–2020	Succeeded by Joe Bishop-Henchman
