= Libertarian Party of Georgia =

State affiliate of the Libertarian Party

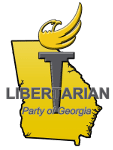
- Founded: 1972
- Ideology: Libertarianism; Non-interventionism; Fiscal conservatism Economic liberalism Cultural liberalism Laissez-faire; Classical liberalism
- National affiliation: Libertarian Party (United States)
- Colors: Gold
- Georgia Senate: 0 / 56
- Georgia House of Representatives: 0 / 180
- U.S. Senate (Georgia): 0 / 2
- U.S. House of Representatives (Georgia): 0 / 14
- Other elected officials: 0 (June 2024)

Website
- lpgeorgia.com

Founded in 1971, The Libertarian Party of Georgia is a state affiliate of the United States Libertarian Party.

== Candidates ==
In 1995 Bruce Van Buren won a city council seat in Avondale Estates. That same year Dewayne Methaney won a city council seat in Auburn, where he went on to become mayor in 1998.

John Monds's 2008 run for Public Service Commission District 1 made him the first Libertarian in the country to receive more than 1 Million votes (1,076,780 or 33.4%). His run for governor in 2010 made him the first black gubernatorial candidate to appear on Georgia's general election ballot in history.

Chase Oliver ran for Senate in 2020. He received over 2% of the vote. This was sizeable for a Libertarian running for a national position, and kept both Democratic and Republican nominees from reaching 50%. This forced a runoff according to Georgia law. This was accomplished on a shoestring budget of approximately $10,000, while his opponents spent nearly a quarter billion dollars between them.

== See also ==
- List of state parties of the Libertarian Party (United States)
