= Spike Cohen =

American political activist, entrepreneur, and podcaster (born 1982)

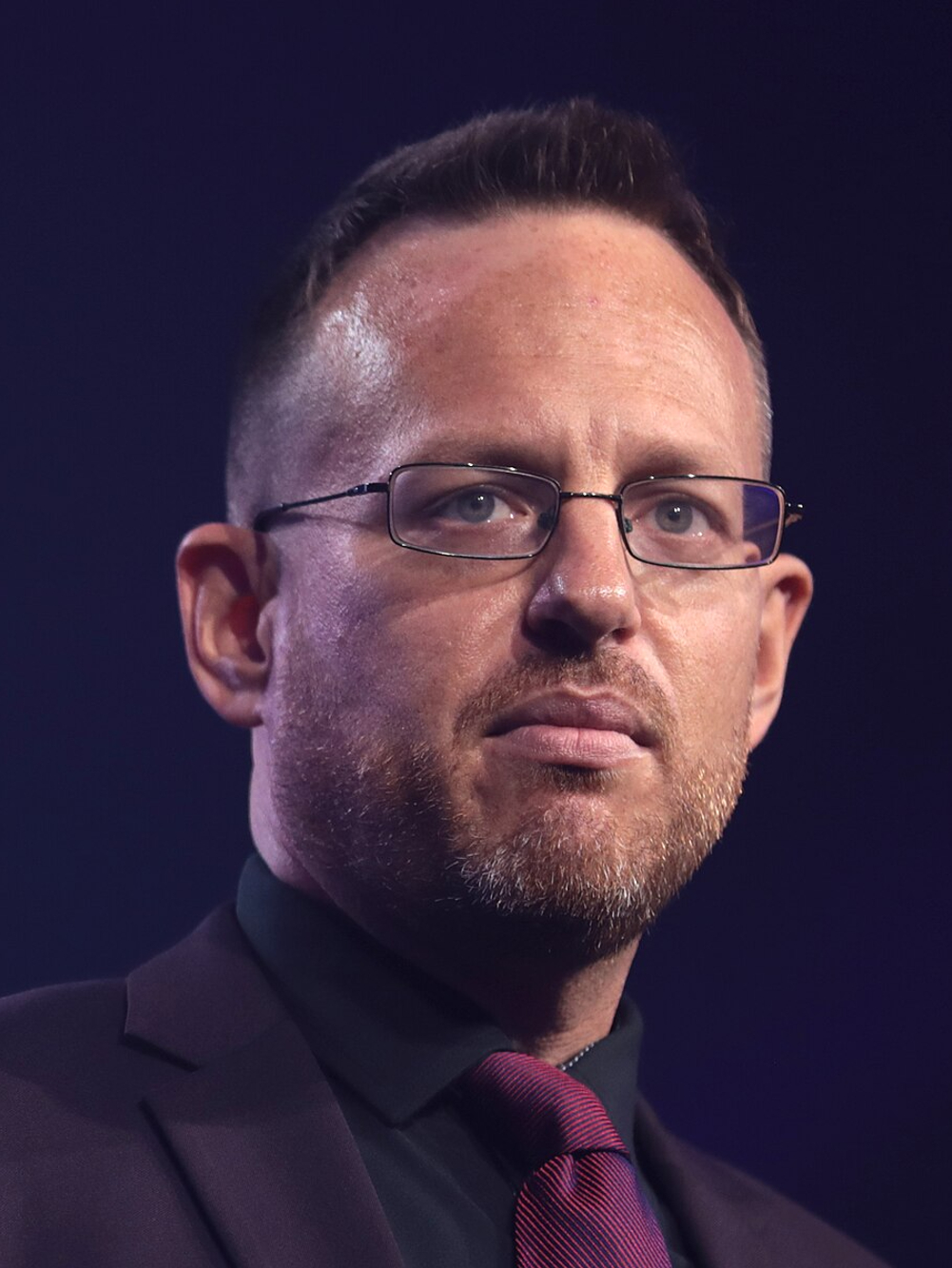
- Cohen in 2022
- Born: Jeremy Cohen; June 28, 1982 (age 44); Baltimore, Maryland, U.S.
- Other name: Spike
- Citizenship: United States
- Occupations: Political activist; entrepreneur; podcaster
- Years active: 1998–present
- Organization(s): Muddied Waters Media; You Are The Power
- Known for: Co-owner of Muddied Waters Media; founder and president of You Are The Power; Libertarian vice-presidential nominee (2020)
- Notable work: The Muddied Waters of Freedom; My Fellow Americans
- Title: Founder and president, You Are The Power
- Political party: Libertarian
- Movement: Libertarianism
- Spouse: Tasha Cohen (m. 2010)
- Spike Cohen's voice Cohen speaks in front of the New Hampshire State House; Recorded 29 September 2020
- Website: Official website

Jeremy "Spike" Cohen (born June 28, 1982) is an American libertarian political activist, entrepreneur, and podcaster. He is the founder of Muddied Waters Media, a platform for libertarian commentary and discourse, which he has used to advocate for individual liberty, voluntary solutions to societal issues, and reducing government overreach. He has also been a prominent advocate for private charity and mutual aid networks as alternatives to government welfare programs, emphasizing the importance of community-driven initiatives. Cohen frequently engages with grassroots organizations and local communities, promoting education on libertarian principles and supporting efforts to dismantle systemic barriers to personal and economic freedom.

He was the Libertarian Party's nominee for vice president of the United States in 2020, serving as Jo Jorgensen's running mate. As the Libertarian Party's vice presidential nominee in 2020, Cohen focused on a range of issues, including ending qualified immunity for law enforcement, criminal justice reform, scaling back U.S. military interventions, and reducing federal taxation and regulation.

In 2022, he founded You Are The Power, an organization created to support human respect and mutual aid and to oppose state and local government overreach.

== Personal life ==
Cohen was born in Baltimore, Maryland, in 1982. Cohen's father is Jewish, and he was raised as a Messianic Jew, including having a bar mitzvah.

He picked the nickname "Spike" at the age of 3, after the character from the 1986 children's film My Little Pony: The Movie.

Cohen has been married to his wife, Tasha, since 2010. He lives in Myrtle Beach, South Carolina. He is a Christian.

== Career ==
In 1998, at the age of 16, Cohen began learning web design and subsequently started a profitable business within a few years. In 2016, after being diagnosed with multiple sclerosis, Cohen sold his web design business and turned his focus to libertarian messaging, entertainment, and activism.

== Media and broadcasting ==
=== Podcasts and shows ===
Cohen has produced libertarian-oriented content through Muddied Waters Media, including the shows The Muddied Waters of Freedom and My Fellow Americans.

=== Guest appearances and interviews ===
During the 2020 election cycle, Cohen and Jo Jorgensen participated in joint broadcast interviews about their campaign and platform. In 2024, Cohen participated in campus programming at Dartmouth College and was interviewed by student media in connection with those events.

=== Speaking engagements ===
Cohen has appeared at political and civic events, including Libertarian campaign stops during the 2020 cycle. In 2024, he took part in a Dartmouth Political Union debate on gun policy.

== Activism and mutual aid work ==
=== You Are The Power ===
In 2022, Cohen founded You Are The Power, an organization created to support human respect and mutual aid and to oppose state and local government overreach. Cohen states that the guiding principle of the organization is human respect. Specifically, Cohen stated, "The core of what I do at You Are The Power is to spread and act upon what I call the principle of human respect. When we respect each other as individual human beings, we are happier, we are more prosperous, we are more harmonious. Obviously the more we disrespect one another, the less of those things we are."

The organization has protested a 3,000 bed prison being constructed at Mill Creek Mountain. It created a documentary about this opposition, "The Fight for Human Respect at Mill Creek Mountain."

=== Community outreach and charity initiatives ===
In 2023, Cohen and You Are The Power became involved in advocacy related to a homeless encampment in Gastonia, North Carolina, including public comment before the city council.

=== Partnerships and coalition work ===
Cohen has participated in issue coalitions with groups across the political spectrum. In 2021, he traveled to Ohio to support a petition drive seeking to end qualified immunity for law enforcement and other public employees.

=== Legal advocacy and litigation support ===
Cohen has supported campaigns that moved through election-law review and related court proceedings as part of ballot-initiative activity on qualified immunity in Ohio.

== 2020 vice presidential campaign ==
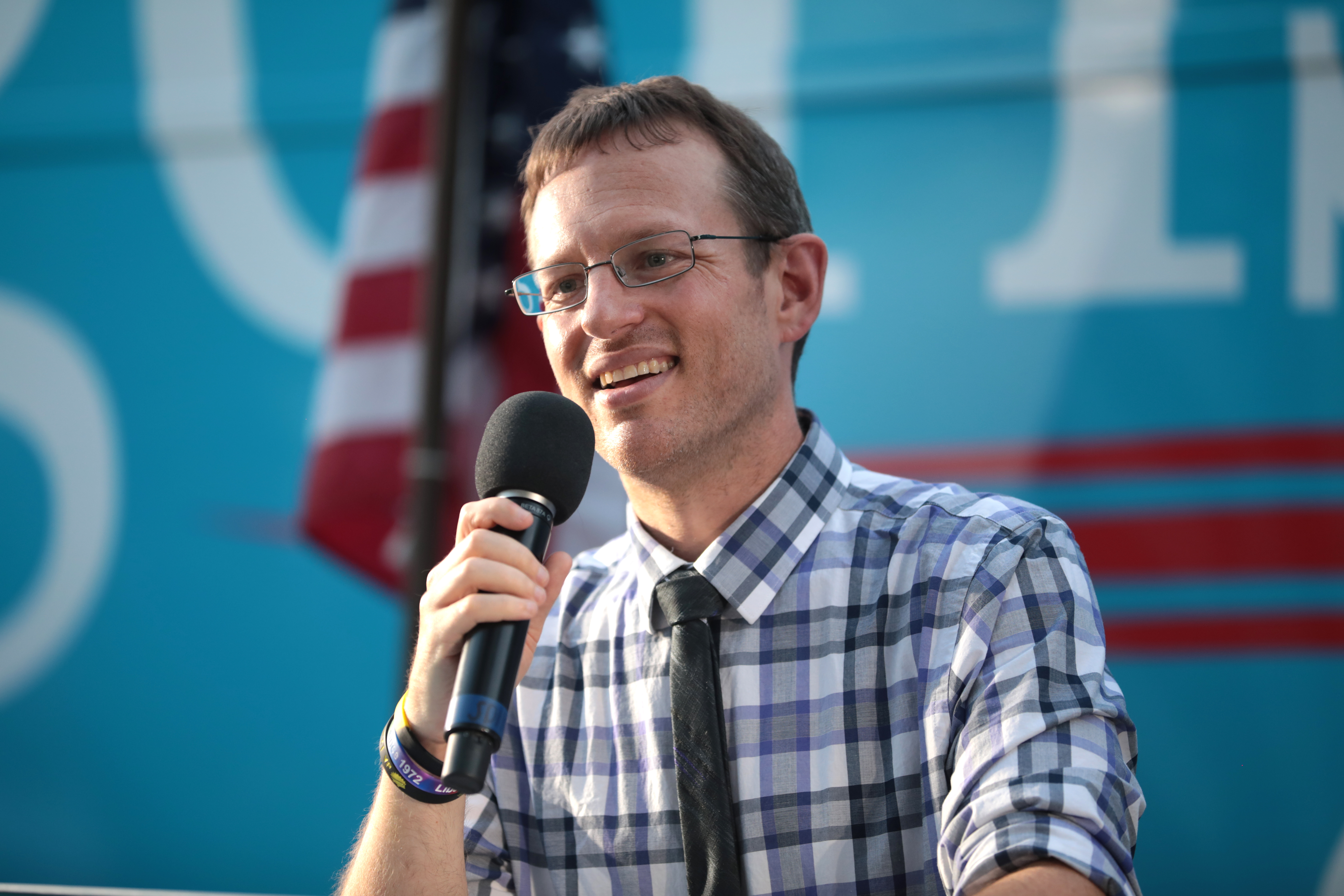
Cohen speaking at a vice presidential campaign rally in Tempe, Arizona

Cohen ran as the proposed running mate of presidential candidate Vermin Supreme in the 2020 Libertarian presidential primaries, and was actively involved in campaigning.

After Supreme lost the Libertarian presidential nomination to Jo Jorgensen on May 23, 2020, Cohen remained in the race for the party's vice presidential nomination. Despite Jorgensen having expressed a preference for John Monds to be her running mate over Cohen and Ken Armstrong, Cohen defeated Monds with 533 delegate votes to Monds' 472 after three rounds of voting. As the Libertarian Party's vice presidential nominee, Cohen became the first Jewish vice presidential nominee of a political party since Joe Lieberman in 2000.

=== Political positions ===
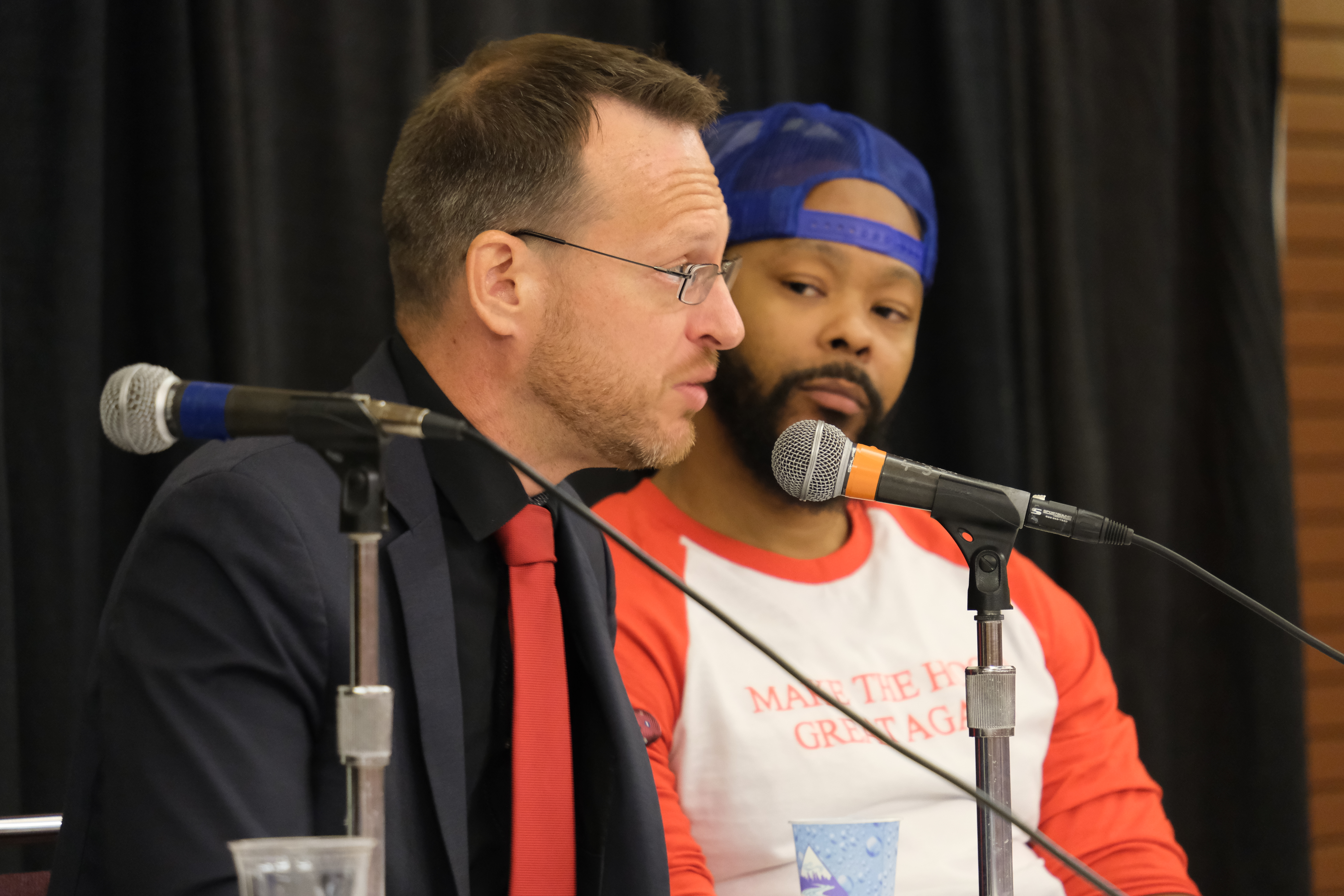
Cohen speaking alongside Maj Toure at FreedomFest 2021

Cohen has asserted that his and Jorgensen's platform was derived from the Libertarian Party platform. This includes reducing the national debt by reducing the size of government, extensive criminal justice reform and the immediate release of those incarcerated for victimless crimes, demilitarization of the police and the creation of police accountability programs.

Cohen supports presidential pardons for Julian Assange, Chelsea Manning, Edward Snowden, Ross Ulbricht, and Leonard Peltier.

Cohen, a former ally of performance artist and perennial candidate Vermin Supreme, ran during his vice presidential primary campaign on a largely satirical platform promoting free ponies, mandatory tooth brushing, "zombie power", killing "baby Hitler" and "baby Woodrow Wilson", and promoting anarchy. Cohen promised that should these not be achieved within the first 100 days of his vice presidency, he would resign and be replaced with Baby Yoda.

After officially receiving the Libertarian vice presidential nomination, Cohen acknowledged that such humor tactics were "all fun satire to bring people in", adding "(t)hen you hit them with the actual message. The actual Libertarian message of self-ownership and non-aggression and voluntary solutions and property rights, and so forth."

== Political activism after 2020 ==
=== Party activity and endorsements ===
Following the 2020 election, Cohen continued participating in Libertarian activism and issue-oriented events, including appearances connected to debates and campus programming.

=== Issue campaigns ===
Cohen has remained active in criminal-justice and policing-related advocacy. In 2021, he appeared in Ohio in support of a proposed constitutional amendment campaign focused on ending qualified immunity. In 2025, the measure advanced after litigation related to the ballot language and review process.

== See also ==
- Third party and independent candidates for the 2020 United States presidential election
- 2020 Libertarian National Convention

Party political offices
| Preceded by Bill Weld | Libertarian nominee for Vice President of the United States; 2020 | Succeeded by Mike ter Maat |
