= John Monds =

American politician

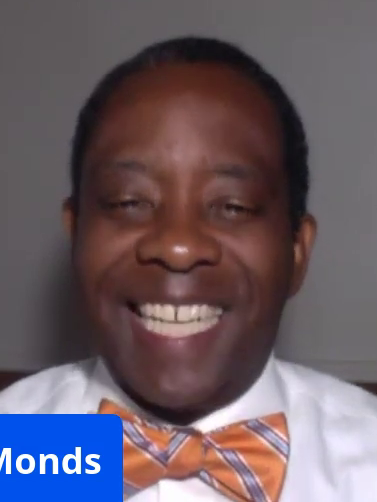
- Monds in 2020
- Born: June 17, 1965 (age 60)
- Education: Morehouse College
- Political party: Libertarian

John Monds (born June 17, 1965) is an American politician and activist. He was the Libertarian nominee for Governor of Georgia in 2010. He was the first African American to appear on the general election ballot for Governor of Georgia.

In 2008, Monds became the first Libertarian Party candidate in both Georgia and the rest of the United States to receive over 1,000,000 votes, when he ran for the Statewide office of Public Service Commission District 1 seat. Monds received 1,076,726 votes for 33.4% of the vote in a two-way race with only a Republican opponent. His vote total was the highest number of votes that a Libertarian candidate had ever received in a United States election at any level, until Gary Johnson received 1,139,562 votes in the 2012 presidential election. Monds also held the record for the highest percentage ever of the vote for a Libertarian in a statewide race until Mike Fellows received over 40% in the 2012 race for clerk of the Montana Supreme Court.

On January 27, 2020, Monds filed his candidacy for the Libertarian nomination for President of the United States in the 2020 election. He was eliminated on the third ballot during the Libertarian Party's first-of-its-kind online national convention on May 23; Jo Jorgensen won the nomination in the fourth round.

== Background ==
Monds is a 1983 graduate of J.M. Tate High School in Gonzalez, Florida and a 1987 graduate of Morehouse College in Atlanta, Georgia where he received a bachelor's degree in banking and finance.

== Recognitions ==
Monds earned the 2002 Superior Service Award and the 2003 Omega Man of the Year Award – both from the Mu Beta Beta Chapter of Omega Psi Phi fraternity. In 2003 he earned the Superior Service Award from the aforementioned fraternity's state organization. In 2005 he was named Man of the Year by the Grady County NAACP.

== Civic and political activities ==
In his capacity as a member and President of the Grady County NAACP, Monds has held financial literacy classes for the Holder Park Summer Program, helped implement the Freedom Day Health Fair and advocated for citizens who believed they had been treated unjustly. He is a twenty-year member of the Omega Psi Phi fraternity and has held various leadership positions on the local and state level including President of the Mu Beta Beta chapter. Monds also serves on the Grady County Planning Commission, Grady County Habitat for Humanity board, the Libertarian Party of Georgia Executive Committee and the Grady County Fine Arts Project.

== Personal life ==
Monds and his wife, Kathaleena Edward Monds, live in Cairo, Georgia and have four children, Akintunde, Cazembe, Halima and Malik.

== Election results ==
Georgia gubernatorial election, 2010
Party	Candidate	Votes	%	±%
Republican	Nathan Deal	1,365,832	53.0	−4.9
Democratic	Roy Barnes	1,107,011	43.0	+4.8
Libertarian	John Monds	103,194	4.0	+0.2
Write-ins		124	nil	
Majority		258,821	10.0	−10.0
Turnout		2,576,161		
Republican hold		Swing		

2008 Public Service Commissioner District 1 election, Georgia
Party	Candidate	Votes	%
Republican	H. Doug Everett	2,147,012	66.6
Libertarian	John Monds	1,076,726	33.4
