= 2020 Libertarian National Convention =

Political event

- 2020 presidential election

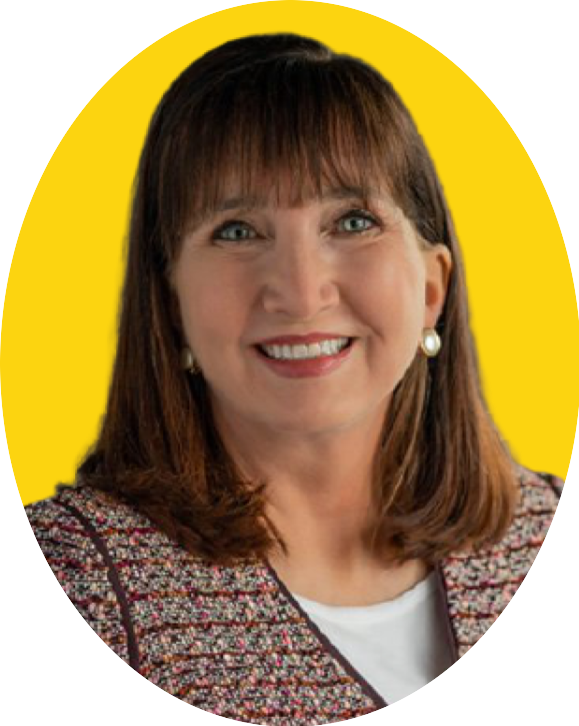
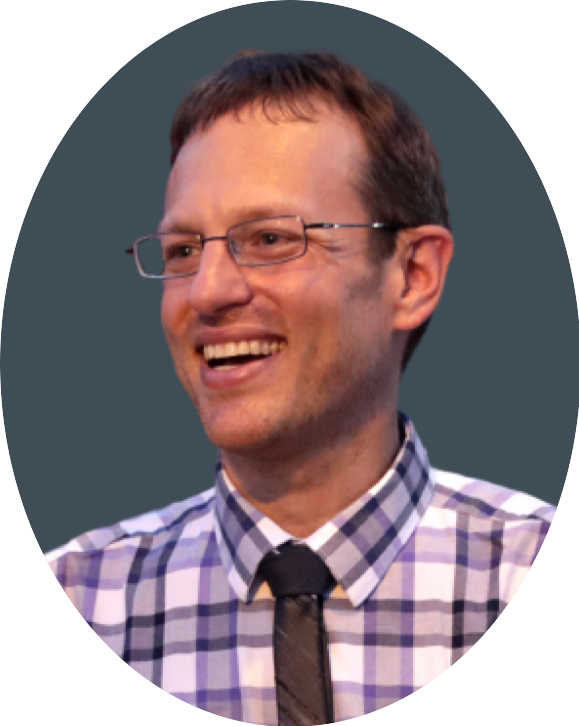
- Nominees; Jorgensen and Cohen

Convention
- Dates: May 22–24 and July 7–12, 2020
- City: None (May); Orlando, FL (July)
- Venue: Online (May); OCCC (July)
- Chair: Nicholas Sarwark

Candidates
- Presidential nominee: Jo Jorgensen of South Carolina
- Vice-presidential nominee: Spike Cohen of South Carolina

Voting
- Total delegates: 1,026 delegates
- Votes needed for nomination: 514

The 2020 Libertarian National Convention delegates selected the Libertarian Party nominees for president and vice president in the 2020 United States presidential election. Primaries were held, but were preferential in nature and did not determine delegate allocation. The convention was originally scheduled to be held from May 21 to May 25 at the JW Marriott Austin luxury hotel in downtown Austin, Texas. On April 26, all reservations at the JW Marriott Austin were canceled in response to the COVID-19 pandemic, leaving the convention oversight committee to seek another venue for a possible July date.

After extensive discussion and debate surrounding the question of whether the party's bylaws permitted it to convene online, the convention was eventually scheduled to be held online from May 22 to May 24 to nominate the party's presidential ticket and in Orlando, Florida, from July 7 to July 12 to conduct other business.

== Nominations and balloting ==
=== Chair election ===
Joe Bishop-Henchman, Tony D'Orazio, Jacob Lamont, Mike Shipley, and Joshua Smith ran for chair of the Libertarian National Committee. Bishop-Henchman and Smith were both incumbent at-large representatives on the committee. Bishop-Henchman was also the incumbent chair of the DC Libertarian Party. Smith previously ran for national chair at the 2018 convention. Incumbent LNC Chair Nicholas Sarwark announced that he would not be running for a fourth term and endorsed Joe Bishop-Henchman.

==== Endorsements ====
Joe Bishop-Henchman

Federal legislators

- Justin Amash, U.S. Representative from MI-3 (2011-2021)

Party officials

- Nicholas Sarwark, Chair of the Libertarian National Committee (2014–2020); Chair of the Libertarian Party of Maryland (2001–2003)
Tony D'Orazio

Candidates

- Larry Sharpe, 2018 Libertarian Party Nominee for Governor of New York
Joshua Smith

Federal officials

- Ron Paul, former U.S. Representative

==== Results ====
No one won a majority on the first round. Mike Shipley was eliminated, while Tony D'Orazio and Jacob Lamont were eliminated after a motion to proceed to a runoff between the top two candidates passed. Joe Bishop-Henchman was elected on the second round

2020 Libertarian National Committee chair election First Round
Candidate	First Ballot	Percentage
Joe Bishop-Henchman	425	43.8%
Joshua Smith	327	33.7%
Tony D'Orazio	86	8.9%
Jacob Lamont	60	6.2%
Mike Shipley	38	3.9%
NOTA	27	2.8%
Dulap Nelson (write-in)	4	0.4%
Brandon Nelson (write-in)	2	0.2%
Alex Merced (write-in)	1	0.1%
Totals	970	100%

2020 Libertarian National Committee chair election Second Round
Candidate	First Ballot	Percentage
Joe Bishop-Henchman	528	54.5%
Joshua Smith	397	39.1%
NOTA	57	5.9%
Tony D'Orazio (write-in)	4	0.4%
Nicholas Sarwark (write-in)	1	0.1%
Totals	969	100%

=== Vice-chair election ===
Incumbent LNC Vice Chair Alex Merced indicated that he would not seek re-election.

=== Presidential nomination ===
Delegates were required to submit nominating tokens for candidates who they wished to place on the ballot for the nomination. 30 Tokens was the threshold for being nominated, with Jo Jorgensen, Jacob Hornberger, Vermin Supreme, John Monds, James P. Gray and Adam Kokesh meeting that mark.

=== Vice-presidential nomination ===
The Libertarian Party delegates selected the party's vice-presidential nominee the day after they selected the presidential nominee.

==== Endorsements ====
===== Nominee =====
Spike Cohen

Individuals

- Jacob Hornberger, founder and president of the Future of Freedom Foundation; 2020 presidential candidate
- Vermin Supreme, performance artist, activist and political satirist; 2020 presidential candidate

===== Withdrawn =====
Ken Armstrong

Individuals

- Larry Sharpe, business consultant and candidate for vice-president in 2016 and 2020
John McAfee

Individuals

- Adam Kokesh, activist; 2020 presidential candidate (later endorsed Sharpe)
John Monds

Individuals

- Jo Jorgensen, senior lecturer at Clemson University; 2020 presidential nominee
Larry Sharpe

Judicial officials

- James P. Gray, Former presiding judge for the Superior Court of Orange County, California; Nominee for Vice President in 2012; 2020 presidential candidate

Individuals

- Adam Kokesh activist; 2020 presidential candidate

== Theme ==
The "Libersign", adopted as the Libertarian Party emblem in 1972.

In early 2019, the Libertarian Party held a contest, allowing members to decide the 2020 convention theme, charging $5 a vote. On April 11, it was announced that the winning theme was "TANSTAAFL", an acronym for "There Ain't No Such Thing As a Free Lunch", a libertarian economic concept popularized by American writer Robert Heinlein and subsequently Chicagoan school economist Milton Friedman. The phrase was also embodied in the Libertarian Party's first logo, adopted in 1972, in an image known as the "Libersign".

The second place theme was Ancapistan, an anarcho-capitalist utopia. Ancapistan, although controversial within the Party, was number one for many weeks during the contest, until in the final remaining hours leading up to midnight it was outspent by a few supporters of TANSTAAFL.

The theme contest raked in $24,007 for the LP to gear towards convention expenses.

== Convention speakers ==
=== Planned speakers ===
According to the convention website, the following notable people were scheduled speakers:

- Patrick M. Byrne, founder and former CEO of Overstock.com
- Jim Cantrell, CEO and co-founder of Vector Launch, Inc.
- Laura Ebke, former Libertarian Nebraska state legislator
- Jim Gray, jurist and 2012 Libertarian vice-presidential nominee
- Lisa Jaster, engineer and U.S. Army soldier
- Larry Sharpe, 2018 Libertarian nominee for Governor of New York (keynote speaker)
- Joel Trammell, entrepreneur

=== Keynote speaker dispute ===
Black Guns Matter founder and 2019 candidate for Philadelphia City Council At-Large Maj Toure was initially chosen to be the convention's keynote speaker. This changed in November 2019, when Convention Oversight Committee Chairman Daniel Hayes rescinded Toure's invitation. Hayes cited tweets posted by Toure that were perceived as being transphobic and anti-immigrant. Larry Sharpe, host of The Sharpe Way and 2018 Libertarian candidate for New York Governor was later selected to replace Toure as keynote speaker.

== Delegate allocation ==
Delegates to the convention were allocated based on the number of sustaining members of the national Libertarian Party per state, as well as the percentage of the vote cast by state in the 2016 presidential election for Libertarian presidential nominee Gary Johnson. Delegates voted for changes to the national party's platform and bylaws, on members of the Libertarian National Committee and on the party's 2020 presidential and vice-presidential nominees. A total of 1,046 delegates were selected to vote at the convention.

== Events ==
On the night of May 21 (EST), the final debates for president and vice-president are being held. Participation was limited to those candidates who had finished in the top five in receiving "debate tokens" from the national convention delegates, and had also received over 10% of those tokens. Jim Gray, Jacob Hornberger, Jo Jorgensen, John Monds and Vermin Supreme all met this threshold and participated in the debate. For the vice-presidential debate, participation was also limited to candidates in the top five with a 10% threshold. Larry Sharpe, Spike Cohen and Ken Armstrong participated in the debate, with John McAfee placing in the top five but not receiving 10% of the tokens. (Note: Fifth place went to Monds, who was not running for vice-president)

== Schedule ==
Due to the coronavirus pandemic, the balloting for the LP presidential nomination was held online, while the rest of the convention was scheduled be held in person in July. Several practice runs were done the previous weekend.

=== Sunday, May 17th ===
Final Credentials Committee Report Pre-convention

=== Thursday, May 21st ===
- Presidential debate, moderated by John Stossel. (8:30PM Eastern Time)
- Vice-presidential debate, hosted by Jim Turney (approx 10PM Eastern Time)

Both were broadcast on the Libertarian Party's YouTube channel.

=== Friday, May 22nd ===
- Convention opens at 6PM Eastern Time
- Credentials report.
- Adoption of Agenda.

=== Saturday, May 23rd ===
- Business resumes at 11AM Eastern Time
- Nomination process for 2020 Libertarian Presidential Nominee

Jo Jorgensen is nominated on the fourth ballot.

=== Sunday, May 24th ===
- Business resumes at 10AM Eastern Time
- Nomination process for 2020 Libertarian Vice-Presidential Nominee

Spike Cohen is nominated on the third ballot.

== Presidential nomination results ==
=== Nomination round ===
Only candidates who received 30 or more tokens from the delegates qualified for the ballot.

2020 Libertarian National Convention Presidential vote – Nominations
Candidate	Tokens	Percentage
Jacob Hornberger	218	24.8%
Jo Jorgensen	193	22.0%
Vermin Supreme	103	11.7%
John Monds	95	10.8%
Jim Gray	89	10.1%
Adam Kokesh	58	6.6%
Justin Amash (write-in)	27	3.1%
Arvin Vohra	27	3.1%
Dan Behrman	18	2.1%
Sam Robb	14	1.6%
Kim Ruff (write-in)	11	1.3%
Sorinne Ardeleanu	9	1.0%
Spike Cohen (write-in)	7	0.8%
Nicholas Sarwark (write-in)	6	0.7%
Larry Sharpe (write-in)	4	0.5%
Totals	879	100%

There were several attempts to place candidates who had not received 30 tokens on the ballot anyway, with special attention drawn to an attempt to place "Great Meteor of Death" on the ballot.

=== Balloting ===
First round delegate winner by state/territory: Jo Jorgensen Jacob Hornberger John Monds Vermin Supreme Jim Gray Justin Amash (write-in) Tie

Second round delegate winner by state/territory: Jo Jorgensen Jacob Hornberger John Monds Vermin Supreme Jim Gray Tie

Third round delegate winner by state/territory: Jo Jorgensen Jacob Hornberger John Monds Vermin Supreme Tie

Final round delegate winner by state/territory: Jo Jorgensen Jacob Hornberger Vermin Supreme Tie

No candidate achieved the majority on the first ballot, so there was a second ballot vote. Due to finishing last of the six nominated candidates, Kokesh was excluded from the second ballot. No candidate achieved the majority on the second ballot, so there was a third ballot vote. Due to finishing last of the five remaining nominated candidates, Gray was excluded from the third ballot. Gray subsequently endorsed Jorgensen in his concession speech while Gray's running mate Larry Sharpe withdrew from the vice-presidential nomination. No candidate achieved the majority on the third ballot, so there was a fourth ballot vote. Due to finishing last of the four remaining nominated candidates, Monds was excluded from the fourth ballot. Monds subsequently endorsed Jorgensen in his concession speech and indicated he would accept the vice-presidential nomination if offered by the delegates.

Jorgensen was nominated on the fourth ballot with 51.1% of the vote.

2020 Libertarian National Convention Presidential vote – First Round			Second Round		Third Round		Fourth Round	
Candidate	Nominations	Percentage	Nominations	Percentage	Nominations	Percentage	Nominations	Percentage
Jo Jorgensen	248	24.4%	339	33.0%	390	38.1%	524	51.07%
Jacob Hornberger	236	23.2%	257	25.0%	264	25.7%	285	27.8%
Vermin Supreme	171	16.8%	184	17.9%	188	18.3%	206	20.1%
John Monds	147	14.5%	169	16.4%	174	16.7%	1	0.1%
Jim Gray	98	9.6%	64	6.2%	–	–	–	–
Adam Kokesh	77	7.6%	6	0.6%	1	0.1%	1	0.1%
None of the Above	8	0.8%	6	0.6%	7	0.7%	4	0.5%
Nicholas Sarwark (write-in)	5	0.5%	1	0.1%	1	0.1%	1	0.1%
Sorinne Ardeleanu (write-in)	2	0.2%	–	–	–	–	1	0.1%
John Ammens (write-in)	–	–	–	–	–	–	1	0.1%
Ryan Graham (write-in)	–	–	–	–	–	–	1	0.1%
Godzilla (write-in)	–	–	–	–	–	–	1	0.1%
Laura Ebke (write-in)	–	–	–	–	1	0.1%	–	-
Justin Amash (write-in)	17	1.7%	1	0.1%	–	–	–	–
Darryl Perry (write-in)	–	–	1	0.1%	–	–	–	–
Arvin Vohra (write-in)	3	0.3%	–	–	–	–	–	–
Edward Snowden (write-in)	2	0.2%	–	–	–	–	–	–
Rhett Boogie (write-in)	1	0.1%	–	–	–	–	–	–
Lincoln Chafee (write-in)	1	0.1%	–	–	–	–	–	–
John Stossel (write-in)	1	0.1%	–	–	–	–	–	–
Totals	1,017	100%	1,028	100%	1,026	100%	1,026	100%

== Vice presidential nomination results ==
Only candidates who received 30 or more tokens from the convention delegates qualified for the ballot.

=== Nomination round ===
2020 Libertarian National Convention Vice Presidential vote – Nominations
Candidate	Tokens	Percentage
Spike Cohen	302	34.6%
John Monds	296	33.9%
Ken Armstrong	115	13.2%
Adam Kokesh	69	7.9%
Larry Sharpe (write-in)	21	2.4%
Nicholas Sarwark (write-in)	20	2.3%
Zoltan Istvan	7	0.8%
Vermin Supreme (write-in)	7	0.8%
James P. Gray (write-in)	6	0.7%
John McAfee	6	0.7%
Sam Robb (write-in)	5	0.6%
Tulsi Gabbard (write-in)	2	0.2%
Michael Heise (write-in)	2	0.2%
Ron Paul (write-in)	2	0.2%
Totals	874	100%

=== Balloting ===
Prior to voting, presidential nominee Jo Jorgensen said that she would be voting for John Monds as her vice presidential running mate, but declined to endorse a candidate.

No candidate achieved the majority on the first ballot, so there was a second ballot vote. Due to finishing last of the four nominated candidates, Kokesh was excluded from the second ballot. No candidate achieved the majority on the second ballot, so there was a third ballot vote. Due to finishing last of the three remaining nominated candidates, Armstrong was excluded from the third ballot. Armstrong endorsed Cohen in his concession speech. Cohen received the vice presidential nomination on the third ballot.

2020 Libertarian National Convention Vice Presidential vote – First Round			Second Round		Third Round	
Candidate	Nominations	Percentage	Nominations	Percentage	Nominations	Percentage
Spike Cohen	416	40.6%	474	46.2%	533	52.2%
John Monds	322	31.5%	432	42.2%	472	46.2%
Ken Armstrong	180	17.6%	96	9.2%	1	0.1%
Adam Kokesh	87	8.5%	4	0.4%	3	0.3%
None of the above	7	0.7%	12	1.2%	10	1.0%
John McAfee (write-in)	2	0.2%	–	–	–	–
Nicholas Sarwark (write-in)	2	0.2%	–	–	–	–
Justin Amash (write-in)	1	0.1%	1	0.1%	–	–
Sorinne Ardeleanu (write-in)	1	0.1%	1	0.1%	1	0.1%
Julian Assange (write-in)	1	0.1%	1	0.1%	–	–
Rhett Boogie (write-in)	1	0.1%	–	–	–	–
Michael Cordova (write-in)	–	–	–	–	1	0.1%
Laura Ebke (write-in)	1	0.1%	–	–	–	–
Michael Kalagias (write-in)	1	0.1%	–	–	–	–
				–	–	–
Ron Paul (write-in)	–	–	1	0.1%	1	0.1%
Nicholas Sarwark (write-in)	1	0.1%	–	–	–	–
Edward Snowden (write-in)	1	0.1%	2	0.2%	–	–
Chris Spangle (write-in)	–	–	2	0.2%	–	–
Vermin Supreme (write-in)	1	0.1%	–	–	–	–
Totals	1,024	10%	1,025	100%	1,022	100%

== Delegate polling ==
=== National polling of delegates to the Convention ===
Both of these polls were conducted using ranked choice voting, progression down the table indicates later rounds of voting as the candidate with the lowest total is eliminated.

Poll source	Sample size	Date(s)	Amash	Gray	Hornberger	Jorgensen	Kokesh	Monds	Supreme	Others
OpaVote	Released May 19, 2020	350 (V) (Note: Ranked Choice Voting)	– (Note: Without Amash)	17.4%	22.9%	22%	7.7%	9.1%	12.6%	8.3 (Note: None of the Above with 3.7%; Vohra with 2.3%; Behrman with 1.4%; Robb with 0.9%; Brian Ellison with no votes) (Note: No votes exhausted)
OpaVote	Released May 19, 2020	350 (V)	–	17.4%	22.9%	22%	7.7%	9.1%	12.6%	8.3 (Note: None of the Above with 3.7%; Vohra with 2.3%; Behrman with 1.4%; Robb with 0.9%)
OpaVote	Released May 19, 2020	350 (V)	–	17.7%	23.1%	22.3%	7.7%	9.1%	12.6%	7.4% (Note: None of the Above with 3.7%; Vohra with 2.3%; Behrman with 1.4%)
OpaVote	Released May 19, 2020	350 (V)	–	17.7%	23.4%	22.3%	7.7%	9.7%	12.9%	6.3% (Note: None of the Above with 3.7%; Vohra with 2.6%)
OpaVote	Released May 19, 2020	350 (V)	–	17.7%	24.0%	22.3%	8.6%	10%	13.7%	3.7% (Note: None of the Above with 3.7%)
OpaVote	Released May 19, 2020	350 (V)	–	19.2%	24.4%	23%	8.8%	10.5%	14.2%	– (Note: 6 votes exhausted)
OpaVote	Released May 19, 2020	350 (V)	–	20.4%	25.7%	26%	–	11.5%	16.3%	– (Note: 12 votes exhausted)
OpaVote	Released May 19, 2020	350 (V)	–	22%	27.6%	31.8%	–	–	18.7%	– (Note: 13 votes exhausted)
OpaVote	Released May 19, 2020	350 (V)	–	26.5%	32.4%	41.1%	–	–	–	– (Note: 29 votes exhausted)
OpaVote	Released May 19, 2020	350 (V)	–	–	39.5%	60.5%	–	–	–	– (Note: 46 votes exhausted)
OpaVote	Released May 19, 2020	350 (V)	36.2%	6.1%	17.1%	12.8%	7%	5.5%	9.9%	5.4% (Note: Vohra with 2.3%; None of the Above with 1.4%; Behra and Robb with 0.9%; Brian Ellison with no votes)
OpaVote	Released May 19, 2020	350 (V)	36.2%	6.1%	17.1%	12.8%	7%	5.5%	9.9%	5.4% (Note: Vohra with 2.3%; None of the Above with 1.4%; Behra and Robb with 0.9%)
OpaVote	Released May 19, 2020	350 (V)	36.2%	6.1%	17.4%	12.8%	7%	5.5%	10.1%	4.9% (Note: Vohra with 2.3%; None of the Above with 1.4%; Robb with 1.2%)
OpaVote	Released May 19, 2020	350 (V)	36.2%	6.4%	18%	13%	7%	5.5%	10.1%	3.7% (Note: Vohra with 2.3%; None of the Above with 1.4%)
OpaVote	Released May 19, 2020	350 (V)	36.8%	6.7%	18.1%	13.2%	7%	5.6%	10.2%	2.3% (Note: Vohra with 2.3%) (Note: 3 votes exhausted)
OpaVote	Released May 19, 2020	350 (V)	37.1%	6.7%	18.7%	13.2%	7.6%	5.8%	10.8%	–
OpaVote	Released May 19, 2020	350 (V)	37.7%	7%	19.9%	15.2%	7.9%	–	12.3%	–
OpaVote	Released May 19, 2020	350 (V)	39.4%	–	20.6%	19.1%	8.2%	–	12.6%	– (Note: 5 votes exhausted)
OpaVote	Released May 19, 2020	350 (V)	41.1%	–	21.9%	22.2%	–	–	14.7%	–
OpaVote	Released May 19, 2020	350 (V)	44.9%	–	25.6%	29.4%	–	–	–	–
OpaVote	Released May 19, 2020	350 (V)	52.8%	–	–	47.2%	–	–	–	– (Note: 40 votes exhausted)

== See also ==
- 2020 Libertarian Party presidential primaries
- 2020 Republican National Convention
- 2020 Democratic National Convention
- 2020 Green National Convention
- 2020 Constitution Party National Convention
- 2020 United States presidential election
