= List of American libertarians =

This is a list of notable libertarians in the United States. It includes people who have identified themselves as members of the Libertarian Party or with Libertarianism in their political or social philosophy.

== A ==
- Max Abramson, State Representative from New Hampshire
- Imad-ad-Dean Ahmad, Palestinian-American scholar and the president of the Minaret of Freedom Institute; 2012 Libertarian Party nominee for the U.S. Senate in Maryland
- Norma Jean Almodovar, 1986 Libertarian Party nominee for Lieutenant Governor of California
- Justin Amash, former U.S. Representative from Michigan
- Michael Arrington, founder of TechCrunch
- Cliff Asness, hedge fund manager

== B ==
- Jim Babka, president of the Downsize DC Foundation; former chair of the Libertarian Party of Ohio
- Michael Badnarik, 2004 Libertarian Party presidential nominee
- Peter Bagge, cartoonist
- Radley Balko, journalist, blogger, and author
- Doug Bandow, blogger, columnist, writer, Senior Fellow at the Cato Institute
- John Perry Barlow, lyricist and co-founder of the Electronic Frontier Foundation
- Randy Barnett, legal scholar and law professor
- Bob Barr, former U.S. Representative from Georgia and 2008 Libertarian Party presidential nominee
- Christopher R. Barron, founder of GOProud
- Dave Barry, humor columnist
- Jim Bell, entrepreneur and author of an essay describing a method of killing government officials
- Bruce L. Benson, academic
- David Bergland, 1984 Libertarian Party presidential nominee, and two-time chair of the Libertarian National Committee
- David Bernstein, law professor
- David Boaz, political writer and one-time executive vice president of the Cato Institute.
- Big Boi, rapper
- Clint Bolick, Associate Justice, Arizona Supreme Court; lawyer and founder of the litigation division of the Goldwater Institute
- Scott Boman, 2008 Libertarian Party nominee for the U.S. Senate in Michigan
- Rupert Boneham, Survivor contestant and 2012 Libertarian Party nominee for Governor of Indiana
- Murray Bookchin, writer
- Neal Boortz, radio host
- Andy Borsa, member of the New Hampshire House of Representatives
- James Bovard, author
- R. W. Bradford, founder of Liberty
- Barbara Branden, Canadian-American writer, editor, and lecturer
- Nathaniel Branden, Canadian–American psychotherapist and writer
- Arthur C. Brooks, author
- Harry Browne, 1996 and 2000 Libertarian Party presidential nominee
- David Brudnoy, talk radio host
- Scott Bullock, civil rights attorney
- Gene Burns, talk show host and candidate for the Libertarian Party's presidential nomination in 1984
- Marshall Burt, member of the Wyoming House of Representatives

== C ==
- Richard Campagna, 2004 Libertarian Party vice-presidential nominee
- Bryan Caplan, economist, writer, and academic
- Drew Carey, comedian and actor
- Dale Carpenter, law professor
- Doug Casey, investor, writer, founder and chairman of Casey Research
- Dixie Carter, actress
- Graydon Carter, former editor of Vanity Fair
- Rodney Caston, cybersecurity expert, open-source intelligence investigator, writer, and 2012 Libertarian Party nominee for the Texas House of Representatives
- John Chamberlain, journalist
- Marilyn Chambers, 2004 Personal Choice Party vice-presidential nominee and pornographic actress
- Gary Chartier, legal scholar, philosopher, political theorist, and theologian
- Roy Childs, essayist and critic
- Frank Chodorov, writer
- Ed Clark, 1980 Libertarian Party presidential nominee
- Spike Cohen, entrepreneur, podcaster, and 2020 Libertarian Party vice-presidential nominee
- Michael Colley, U.S. Navy vice admiral and member of the board of directors of the Libertarian Party
- Barry Cooper, drug policy reform activist, filmmaker, Libertarian candidate for U.S. House of Representatives in Texas in 2008 and for Texas Attorney General in 2010
- Stephen D. Cox, author, academic, and editor-in-chief of Liberty (2005-2024)
- Richard Cornuelle, activist, political theorist, and author
- Tyler Cowen, economist, columnist, author, and blogger
- Ed Crane, co-founder of the Cato Institute

== D ==
- Brian Doherty, journalist, author, Reason magazine senior editor, and historian of the American libertarian movement.
- Aubrey Dunn, Jr., former New Mexico commissioner of public lands and Libertarian candidate for U.S. Senate in 2018
- Caleb Q. Dyer, former member of the New Hampshire House of Representatives

== E ==
- Charlie Earl, former member of the Ohio House of Representatives, Libertarian Party candidate in the 2014 Ohio gubernatorial election
- Clint Eastwood, former Mayor of Carmel-by-the-Sea, actor and filmmaker
- Richard Epstein, legal scholar, academic, and writer

== F ==
- Ken Fanning, member of the Alaska House of Representatives
- Arthur Farnsworth, Libertarian Party nominee for the U.S. House of Representatives convicted of tax evasion in 2006
- Fred Foldvary, academic, economist, and writer
- Kmele Foster, political commentator and telecommunications entrepreneur
- Conor Friedersdorf, journalist, staff writer at The Atlantic
- David D. Friedman, economist, physicist, legal scholar, political theorist, and author
- Milton Friedman, economist, statistician, and writer
- Patri Friedman, activist, political theorist; founder of The Seasteading Institute
- Rose Friedman, economist

== G ==
- John Galt, inventor of the static engine, philosopher, lecturer.
- Eric Garris, founder of Antiwar.com
- John T. Georgopoulos, founder of SportsGrumblings.com, fantasy sports journalist for various publications, former SiriusXM show host, podcast producer and host
- Nick Gillespie, journalist who has served as a writer, contributor, and editor for Reason magazine, Reason.com, and ReasonTV
- Dan Gookin, author, 2004 Libertarian Party nominee for the Idaho Senate and 2007 Libertarian nominee for the Coeur d'Alene city council
- Daniel P. Gordon, former member of the Rhode Island House of Representatives from 2011 to 2013, who changed his party affiliation from Republican to Libertarian; at the time, he was the only Libertarian serving in any state legislative house in the country
- Don Gorman, former member of the New Hampshire House of Representatives
- Jim Gray, former presiding judge of the Superior Court of Orange County, California; 2012 Libertarian vice-presidential nominee and candidate for the 2020 Libertarian presidential nomination
- Greg Gutfeld, host of The Greg Gutfeld Show and one of five co-hosts and panelists on the political talk show The Five, both on the Fox News Channel

== H ==
- F. A. Harper, academic, economist, and writer; founder of the Institute for Humane Studies
- Phil Harvey, entrepreneur and philanthropist, President of Adam & Eve
- Henry Hazlitt, journalist, editor, economist, and author
- Gene Healy, political pundit, journalist, editor, and author; Vice President at the Cato Institute and contributing editor to Liberty magazine
- Karl Hess, activist, speechwriter, journalist, editor, and political philosopher
- Jeff Hewitt, Riverside County, California Supervisor, and Libertarian gubernatorial candidate in the 2021 California gubernatorial recall election
- Robert Higgs, economist, historian, and writer
- John Holt, author and educator, a proponent of unschooling, and a pioneer in youth rights theory
- John Hospers, philosophy professor and 1972 Libertarian Party presidential nominee
- Carla Howell, activist and 2002 Libertarian Party nominee for Governor of Massachusetts
- Michael Huemer, academic, philosopher, and writer

== J ==
- Paul Jacob, activist and commentator
- Glenn Jacobs, Mayor, of Knox County, wrestler known as Kane
- Penn Jillette, magician (renounced libertarianism in 2020).
- Gary Johnson, former Governor of New Mexico and 2012 and 2016 Libertarian Party presidential nominee
- Stan Jones, 2002 Libertarian Party nominee for the U.S. Senate in Montana
- Alex Joseph, mayor of Big Water, Utah
- Jo Jorgensen, 1996 Libertarian Party vice-presidential nominee and 2020 presidential nominee
- Eric July, musician, YouTuber, comic book writer, and political commentator

== K ==
- Rob Kampia, activist, 2000 Libertarian Party nominee for delegate to the U.S. House of Representatives in the District of Columbia
- Chris Kluwe, former punter for the Minnesota Vikings
- Charles G. Koch, businessman
- David H. Koch, businessman and 1980 Libertarian Party vice-presidential nominee
- Adam Kokesh, activist, author, and 2020 candidate for the Libertarian presidential nomination
- Bart Kosko, writer, academic, researcher; contributing editor to Liberty
- Alex Kozinski, Chief Judge of the United States Court of Appeals for the Ninth Circuit
- Steve Kubby, activist, writer, and 1998 Libertarian Party nominee for Governor of California and 2000 candidate for the Libertarian vice-presidential nomination

== L ==
- Philip Labonte, musician, singer for heavy metal band All That Remains
- Suzanne La Follette, individualist feminist, political theorist, journalist, and editor
- Sonny Landham, actor and 2008 Libertarian Party nominee for the U.S. Senate in Kentucky, with whom the party cut ties in July of that year
- Rose Wilder Lane, journalist, travel writer, novelist, and political theorist
- James A. Lewis, 1984 Libertarian Party vice-presidential nominee
- Kurt Loder, entertainment critic, author, columnist, and media personality
- Dan Loeb, hedge fund manager
- Nancy Lord, attorney, medical researcher, and 1992 Libertarian Party vice-presidential nominee

== M ==
- Roger MacBride, lawyer and 1976 Libertarian Party presidential nominee
- Spencer MacCallum, anthropologist, business consultant and author
- John Mackey, CEO and co-founder of Whole Foods Market
- Michael Malice, Ukrainian-American author, podcaster, columnist, and media personality
- Andre Marrou, former member of the Alaska House of Representatives and 1992 Libertarian Party presidential nominee
- John McAfee, computer programmer, businessman, and presidential candidate
- Peter McWilliams, self-help author and activist
- Angela McArdle, Chair of the Libertarian National Committee
- Russell Means, Sioux rights activist, actor and 1988 candidate for the Libertarian Party presidential nomination
- Jeffrey Miron, economist and academic
- John Monds, 2008 Libertarian Party nominee for the Georgia Public Service Commission and 2010 Libertarian nominee for Governor of Georgia
- Lisa Kennedy Montgomery, American political commentator, radio personality, author, former MTV VJ, and the current host of Kennedy on the Fox Business Network
- Kary Mullis, 1993 Nobel Prize Winner in Chemistry for the invention of the polymerase chain reaction technique
- Michael Munger, 2008 Libertarian Party nominee for Governor of North Carolina
- Rupert Murdoch, media mogul and founder of global media holding company News Corporation

== N ==
- Loretta Nall, 2006 Libertarian Party nominee for Governor of Alabama
- Andrew Napolitano, former New Jersey Superior Court Judge and host of Freedom Watch
- Tonie Nathan, 1972 Libertarian Party vice-presidential nominee
- Victor Niederhoffer, hedge fund manager, U.S. Squash Champion, 5x in singles, 2x in doubles; U.S. Paddleball Champion, 2x in singles, 2x in doubles, Pierre de Coubertin Fair Play Trophy
- David Nolan, principal founder of the Libertarian Party and candidate for office in Arizona
- Gary Nolan, talk radio personality and 2004 candidate for the Libertarian Party presidential nomination
- Robert Nozick, philosopher

== O ==
- Gary Oldman, actor
- Chase Oliver, activist, business executive; Libertarian Party candidate for the 2022 United States Senate election in Georgia, and 2024 Libertarian presidential nominee
- Art Olivier, 2000 Libertarian Party vice-presidential nominee

== P ==
- Tom G. Palmer, writer and political theorist
- Trey Parker, actor, animator and screenwriter. Parker described himself in 2001 as "a registered Libertarian"
- Isabel Paterson, Canadian-American journalist, novelist, and political philosopher
- Ron Paul, former U.S. Representative from Texas and 1988 Libertarian Party presidential nominee
- Carl Person, attorney and 2012 candidate for the Libertarian Party presidential nomination
- Austin Petersen, activist, commentator, broadcaster, candidate for the 2016 Libertarian presidential nomination
- John Popper, frontman of the rock band Blues Traveler
- Virginia Postrel, columnist, blogger, author, former editor-in-chief of Reason magazine
- Sharon Presley, writer, activist, academic; co-founder of Laissez Faire Books, and executive director of the Association of Libertarian Feminists

== R ==
- Ayn Rand, author: writer of "Atlas Shrugged"
- Ralph Raico, historian, academic, and writer
- Justin Raimondo, founder of Antiwar.com
- Dick Randolph, former member of the Alaska House of Representatives
- Earl Ravenal, Georgetown University professor and 1984 candidate for the Libertarian Party presidential nomination
- Leonard Read, writer, economist; founder of the Foundation for Economic Education (FEE)
- Michael Rectenwald, academic, author, and candidate for the 2024 Libertarian presidential nomination
- Warren Redlich, member of the Guilderland town council and 2010 Libertarian Party nominee for Governor of New York
- Wayne Allyn Root, radio host, businessperson, author; 2008 Libertarian Party vice-presidential nominee
- Murray Rothbard, economist and political philosopher
- Finlay Rothhaus, member of the New Hampshire House of Representatives
- Kurt Russell, actor
- Aaron Russo, film producer and 2004 candidate for the Libertarian Party presidential nomination
- Mary Ruwart, biophysicist and 2008 candidate for the Libertarian Party presidential nomination

== S ==
- Murray Sabrin, 1997 Libertarian nominee for Governor of New Jersey
- Julian Sanchez, journalist, blogger, and editor
- Nicholas Sarwark, attorney and businessperson; former chair of Libertarian National Committee
- Peter Schiff, financial analyst, stockbroker, author, one-time Senate candidate, president and CEO of Euro Pacific Capital Inc.
- Larry Sharpe, entrepreneur, podcaster, and 2018 Libertarian nominee for Governor of New York
- Michael Shermer, science writer and founder of The Skeptics Society
- Julian Simon, economist, academic, and writer
- Paul Singer, founder and CEO of Elliott Management Corporation and founder of the Paul E. Singer Family Foundation
- Sam Sloan, 2010 candidate for the Libertarian nomination for Governor of New York
- Dave Smith, comedian, podcaster.
- Robby Soave, journalist, author, senior editor for Reason
- Ilya Somin, academic, blogger, author, adjunct scholar at the Cato Institute
- John Sophocleus, economics instructor and 2002 Libertarian nominee for Governor of Alabama
- Thomas Sowell, academic, economist, commentator, and social theorist
- Peter St. Onge, American economist
- Joseph Stallcop, former member of the New Hampshire House of Representatives
- Doug Stanhope, stand-up comedian
- Starchild, political activist, perennial candidate, and sex worker
- Matt Stone, actor, animator and screenwriter
- John Stossel, consumer reporter, investigative journalist, author, columnist
- Jacob Sullum, syndicated columnist, journalist, and senior editor at Reason magazine
- Vermin Supreme, performance artist, candidate for the 2020 Libertarian Party presidential nomination
- Thomas Szasz, intellectual, author, opponent of medical coercion, advocate of medical freedom

== T ==
- Kristin Tate, political commentator, columnist & author
- Joan Kennedy Taylor, journalist, author, editor, and activist
- Mike ter Maat, businessperson, professional economist, retired police officer, and 2024 Libertarian vice presidential nominee
- Peter Thiel, co-founder of PayPal
- Ed Thompson, mayor of Tomah, Wisconsin and 2002 Libertarian Party nominee for Governor of Wisconsin
- Katherine Timpf, columnist, television personality, reporter, and comedian
- Christina Tobin, founder of the Free and Equal Elections Foundation and 2010 Libertarian Party nominee for California Secretary of State
- Maj Toure, political activist and rapper; founder of Black Guns Matter
- Jeffrey Tucker, political theorist, editor, writer, and internet entrepreneur

== V ==
- Jimmie Vaughan, musician
- Vince Vaughn, actor

== W ==
- Rufus Wainwright, singer-songwriter
- Jimmy Wales, co-founder of Wikipedia
- Calvin Warburton, member of the New Hampshire House of Representatives and 1992 candidate for the Libertarian Party vice-presidential nomination
- David Weigel, journalist, blogger, contributing editor for Reason magazine
- Matt Welch, blogger and journalist; writer and editor for Reason magazine
- Bill Weld, former Governor of Massachusetts and 2016 Libertarian vice-presidential nominee
- Walter E. Williams, economist, commentator, and academic
- Richard Winger, editor of Ballot Access News
- Tom Woods, author and radio host
- Lily Wu, Mayor of Wichita, Kansas.
- Adrian Wyllie, 2014 candidate for the Libertarian Party nomination for Governor of Florida

== See also ==
- List of American conservatives
- List of American liberals
