= List of Libertarian Party politicians who have held office in the United States =

List of Libertarian Party (USA) politicians who have held public office

This is a list of politicians endorsed by the Libertarian Party of the United States (LP or LPUS) who have held elected office.

As of September 2024, at least 186 Libertarians recognized by the LPUS hold elected office.

Politicians highlighted in yellow were elected as a Libertarian on a Libertarian ticket or as an open Libertarian in a nonpartisan election.

== Federal officials ==
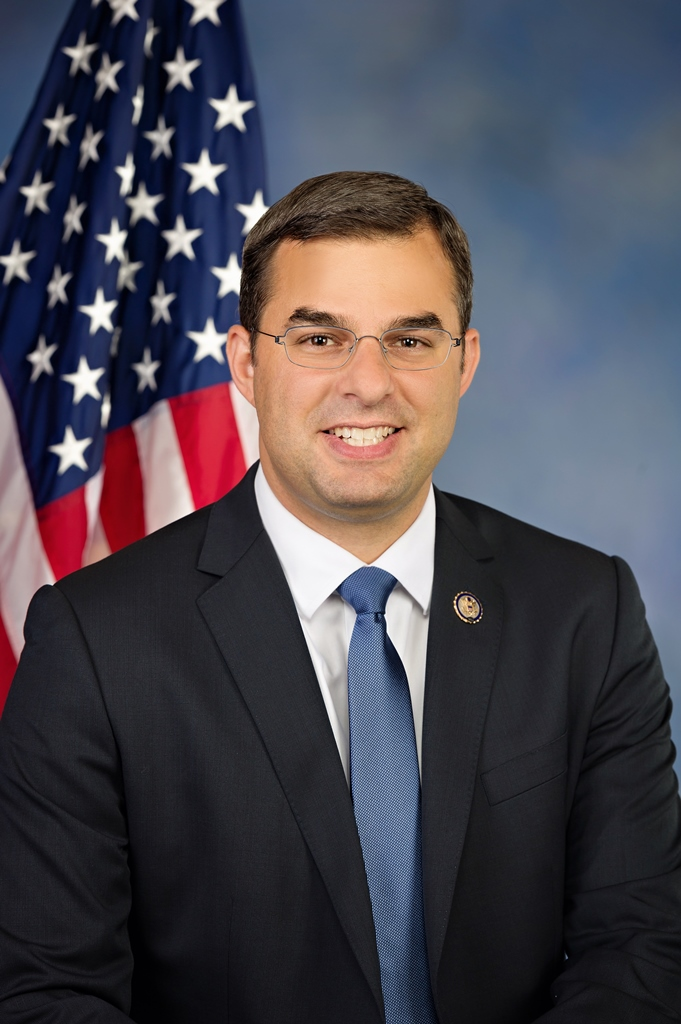
Justin Amash, the only Libertarian ever to hold federal office

=== House of Representatives ===
As of November 2024, only one Libertarian, Justin Amash from Michigan, has served in federal office. He was first elected as a Republican, and left the Republican Party to become an independent in early 2020 before switching to the Libertarian Party in April 2020. He did not seek re-election in 2020 and switched back to the Republican Party in 2024 to run for the U.S. Senate election in Michigan.

==== Former (1) ====
Name	State	District	Term start	Term end	Notes	Ref
Justin Amash	Michigan	3rd	3 January 2013	3 January 2021	elected as Republican, never elected as Libertarian	

== Statewide officials ==
As of November 2023, only one Libertarian, Aubrey Dunn Jr. from New Mexico, has served in an elected statewide office. He was first elected as a Republican, and switched his affiliation to Libertarian in 2018.

=== Former (1) ===
Name	State	Position	Term start	Term end	Notes	Ref
Aubrey Dunn Jr.	New Mexico	New Mexico Commissioner of Public Lands	1 January 2015	1 January 2019	elected as Republican, never elected as Libertarian	

== State legislatures ==
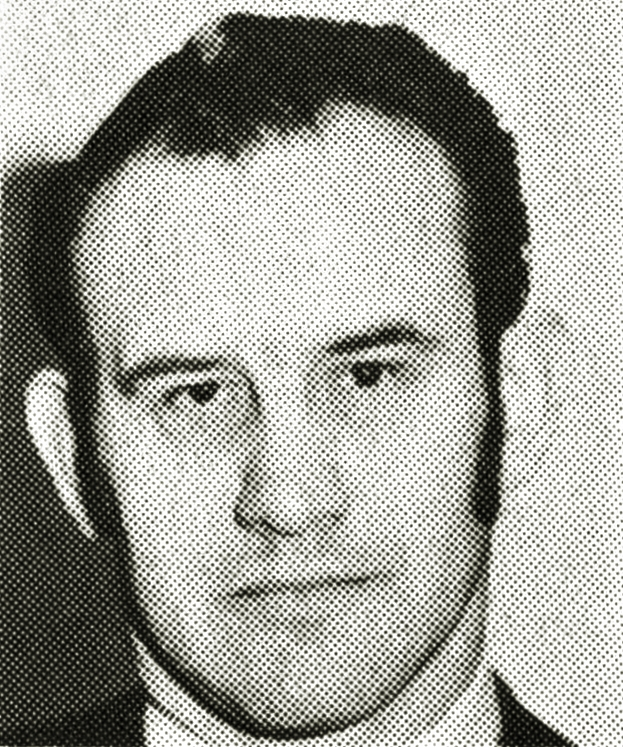
Dick Randolph, first Libertarian elected to a state legislature

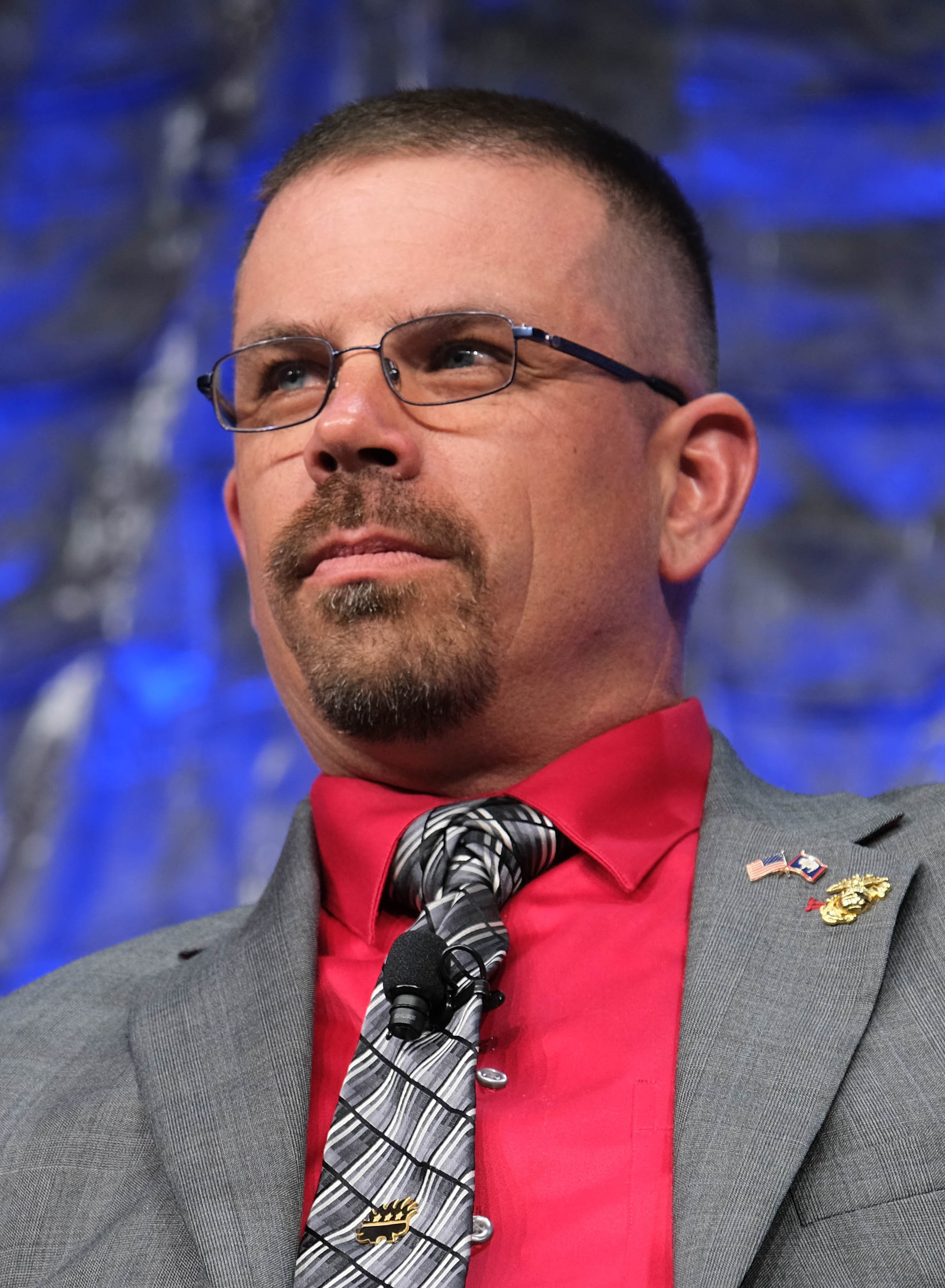
Marshall Burt, first Libertarian elected to a state legislature since the early 2000s

As of 2024, 22 Libertarians have held state-level office. However, only 10 were elected or re-elected as Libertarians.

=== State upper houses ===
==== Former (2) ====
Name	State	District	Term start	Term end	Notes	Ref
Laura Ebke	Nebraska	3rd district	7 January 2015	9 January 2019	elected as Republican in 2014, switched to Libertarian in 2016, never elected as Libertarian (Note: Ebke was first elected as a Republican in 2014, and switched party affiliations in 2016. Nebraska legislators are officially nonpartisan.)	
Mark B. Madsen	Utah	13th district	17 January 2005	January 2017	elected as Republican in 2004, switched to Libertarian in 2016, never elected as Libertarian (Note: Madsen was first elected as a Republican in 2004, but switched parties to become a Libertarian during his final term in office.)	

=== State lower houses ===
==== Former (19) ====
Name	State	District	Term start	Term end	Notes	Ref
Marshall Burt	Wyoming	39th district	12 January 2021	10 January 2023	elected as Libertarian	
John Andrews	Maine	79th district (Note: Andrews previously represented the 73rd district.)	5 December 2018	incumbent	elected as Republican, switched to Libertarian, switched back to Republican, never elected as Libertarian (Note: Andrews was first elected as a Republican in 2018, and switched party affiliations in 2020. He would later return to the Republican Party and be re-elected as such.)	
Joseph Stallcop	New Hampshire	Cheshire–4	7 December 2016	6 August 2018	elected as a Democrat, never elected as Libertarian (Note: Stallcop was first elected as a Democrat. Switched to the Libertarian Party in May 2017. Resigned in May 2018.)	
Caleb Q. Dyer	New Hampshire	Hillsborough–37	7 December 2016	5 December 2018	elected as Republican, never elected as Libertarian (Note: Dyer was first elected as a Republican in 2016, and switched party affiliations on February 9, 2017.)	
Brandon Phinney	New Hampshire	24th Strafford	7 December 2016	5 December 2018	elected as Republican, never elected as Libertarian (Note: Phinney was first elected as a Republican in 2014, and switched party affiliations in June 2017. Was elected to another term as a Republican in 2022.)	
John Moore	Nevada	8th district	5 November 2014	9 November 2016	elected as Republican, never elected as Libertarian (Note: Moore was first elected as a Republican in 2014, and switched party affiliations in January 2016.)	
Max Abramson	New Hampshire	Rockingham–37	December 2014	December 2016	elected as Republican, never elected as Libertarian (Note: Abramson was first elected as a Republican in 2014, and switched party affiliations in May 2016. He would be re-elected as a Republican.)	
Steve Vaillancourt	New Hampshire	Hillsborough–12	1996	2014	elected as Democrat, re-elected as Libertarian, switched to Republican (Note: First elected as a Democrat. Switched to the Libertarian Party and re-elected as such in 2000. Switched to the Republican Party in 2002.)	
Daniel P. Gordon	Rhode Island	71st district	4 January 2011	4 January 2013	elected as Republican, never elected as Libertarian (Note: Gordon was first elected as a Republican in 2010. In September 2011, he was expelled from the Republican caucus for allegedly making derogatory comments about other Republicans online. He switched to the Libertarian Party and lost re-election in 2012.)	
Neil Randall	Vermont	Orange–3	1998	2002	elected on Republican–Libertarian fusion, left Libertarian party, elected as Republican (Note: Randall first elected on a Republican–Libertarian fusion ticket in 1998. Formally left the Libertarian Party and was re-elected as a Republican in 2000.)	
Jarrod Sammis	Vermont	Rutland–3	4 January 2023	8 January 2025	elected as Republican, expelled, switched to Libertarian (Note: Sammis was first elected as a Republican in 2022, but was expelled from the party and switched affiliation in May 2023.)	
Jim McClarin	New Hampshire	Hillsborough 33	1994	1996	elected as Libertarian	
Don Gorman	New Hampshire	Rockingham–8	1992	1996	elected as Libertarian	
Finlay Rothhaus	New Hampshire	Hillsborough–12	1991	1995	elected as a Republican, re-elected as Libertarian (Note: Rothhaus was first elected as a Republican. Switched to the Libertarian Party in 1991, and re-elected as such in 1992.)	
Andy Borsa	New Hampshire	Pelham	1992	1994	elected as Libertarian	
Calvin Warburton	New Hampshire		1990	1992	elected as Republican, never elected as Libertarian (Note: First elected as a Republican. Switched to the Libertarian Party in July 1991.)	
Andre Marrou	Alaska	5th district	January 14, 1985	January 19, 1987	elected as Libertarian	
Ken Fanning	Alaska	20th district	1980	1982	elected as Libertarian	
Dick Randolph	Alaska	20th district	1978	1982	elected as Libertarian (Note: Randolph had previously served as a Republican in the same district from 1970 to 1974.)	

== Local officials ==
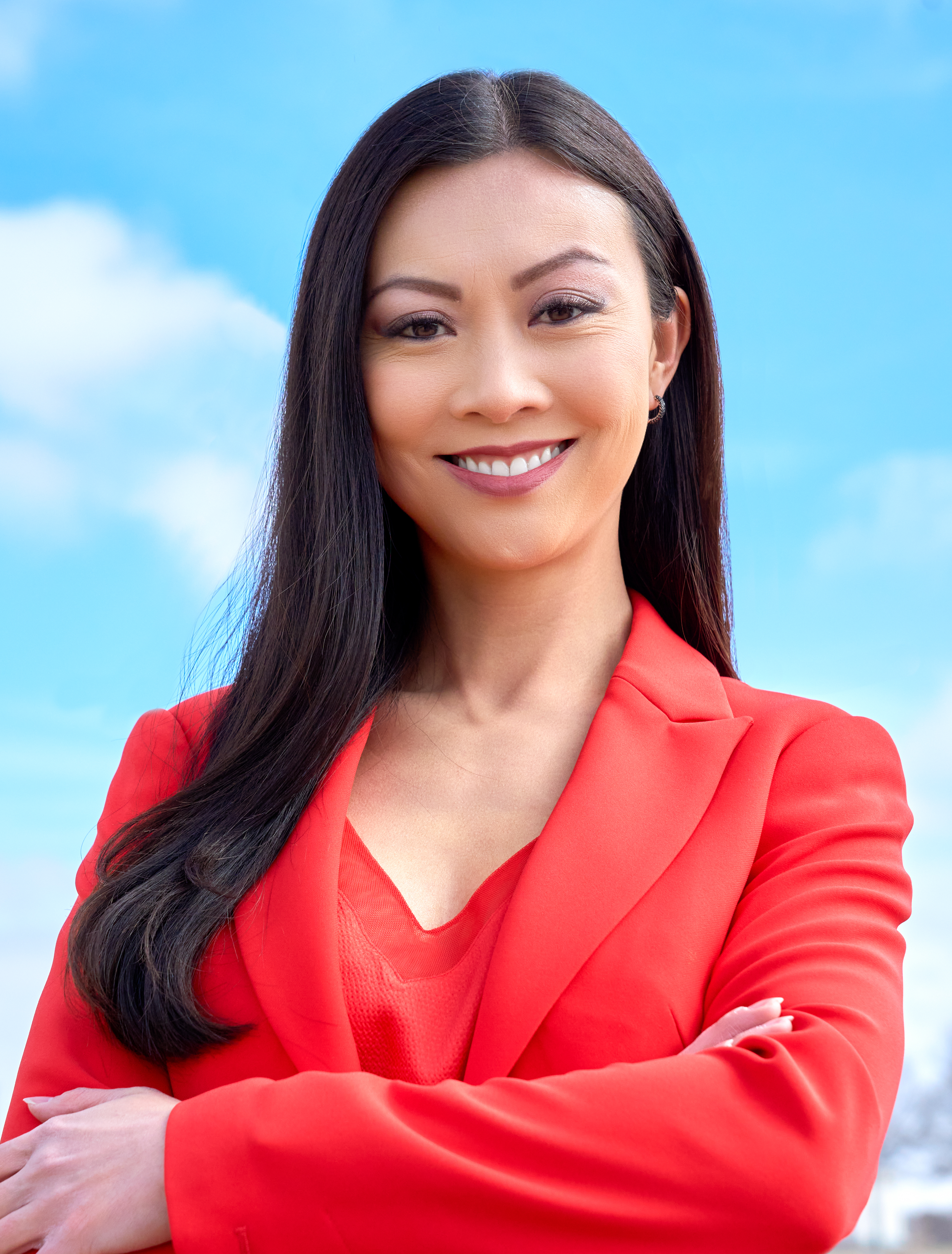
Lily Wu, first Libertarian elected mayor of a city with a population over 100,000.

Many local offices are officially nonpartisan. Politicians highlighted in yellow were elected on a Libertarian ticket. Nonpartisan offices are not highlighted.

=== Mayors ===
==== Current (9) ====
Name	State	City	Term start	Term end	Note	Ref
Lily Wu	Kansas	Wichita	8 January 2024	incumbent	nonpartisan election; registered to vote as a Libertarian, but not a LPUS-recognized official (Note: The Libertarian Party of Kansas does not recognise Wu as an official party member, but she is registered to vote as a Libertarian.)	
Aron Lam	Colorado	Keenesburg	2022	incumbent	nonpartisan election	
Rob Green	Iowa	Cedar Falls	2022	incumbent	nonpartisan election	
Kate Crosby	Pennsylvania	Austin	2022	incumbent	nonpartisan election	
Steve McCluskey	Mississippi	McLain	2021	incumbent	nonpartisan election	
Anthony Keiper	Pennsylvania	Southmont	2021	incumbent	nonpartisan election	
Cassandra Fryman	Ohio	Plymouth	2020	incumbent	nonpartisan election	
Daniel Harmon	Ohio	Thornville	2020	incumbent	nonpartisan election	
Ed Tidwell	Texas	Lago Vista	2017	incumbent	nonpartisan election	
Justin Lynn	Pennsylvania	Renovo	2026	incumbent	elected as Libertarian	

==== Former (13) ====
Name	State	City	Term start	Term end	Note	Ref
Jordan Marlowe	Florida	Newberry	2011	incumbent	nonpartisan election; switched to Forward Party in 2023 (Note: Switched from Libertarian to Forward in 2023.)	
Stephen Chambers	Tennessee	Trousdale County	1 September 2018	1 September 2022	nonpartisan election; elected as open Libertarian	
Bill Woolsey	South Carolina	James Island	2010	7 November 2023	nonpartisan election	
Sally Combs	Pennsylvania	Jersey Shore	January 2022	April 2022	nonpartisan election	
Levi Tappan	Arizona	Page	2018	2022	nonpartisan election	
Tami Wessel	Illinois	Brookport	2017	2021	nonpartisan election	
Martin Sullivan	Florida	Frostproof	2018	2021	nonpartisan election	
Shawn Ruotsinoja	Minnesota	St. Bonifacius	2016	2020	nonpartisan election	
Ed Thompson	Wisconsin	Tomah	April 15, 2008	April 20, 2010	nonpartisan election	
Ed Thompson	Wisconsin	Tomah	2000	2002	nonpartisan election	
Alex Joseph	Utah	Big Water	1983	1994	elected as Republican, re-elected as Libertarian (Note: First elected as a Republican. Switched to the Libertarian Party in 1986.)	
Douglas "Freddie" Odom	Georgia	Bluffton			nonpartisan election	
Tim Russell	Pennsylvania	Emlenton			nonpartisan election; elected as open Libertarian	
Beau Woodcock	Colorado	Milliken			nonpartisan election	

== See also ==
- Libertarian Party
- List of Green politicians who have held office in the United States
- List of third-party and independent performances in United States elections
- List of Democratic Socialists of America public officeholders
