= Libertarian Party of New Hampshire =

Former U.S. state affiliate of the Libertarian Party

- Abbreviation: LPNH
- Chairperson: Jeremy Kauffman
- Founded: August 4, 1974
- Ideology: Libertarianism; Paleolibertarianism; New Hampshire Independence
- Political position: Far-right
- National affiliation: Libertarian Party (until 2026)
- Senate: 0 / 24
- House of Representatives: 0 / 400
- U.S. Senate: 0 / 2
- U.S. House of Representatives: 0 / 2
- Other elected officials: 0 (June 2024)

Website
- lpnh.org

The Libertarian Party of New Hampshire (LPNH) is a political party in the U.S. state of New Hampshire. It was the state affiliate of the national Libertarian Party (LP) until May 2026, when the Libertarian National Committee voted to disaffiliate from the party. Active since its foundation in 1974, it is the third-largest political party in the state and multiple members have been elected to the New Hampshire House of Representatives.

The party became ballot-qualified after receiving over three percent of the popular vote in the 1990 gubernatorial election and maintained that status in the 1992 and 1994 elections. The party elected multiple members to the state house with the use of electoral fusion with the two major parties. Its caucus in the state house was officially recognized from 1992 to 1995, and Representative Don Gorman served as the party's first state house leader, but lost its ballot status after the 1996 gubernatorial election.

Max Abramson regained ballot-qualified status for the LPNH after he received enough support in the 2016 gubernatorial election. The caucus in the state house was re-recognized in 2017, after Caleb Q. Dyer, Joseph Stallcop, and Brandon Phinney changed their political affiliations to Libertarian. However, the party lost its ballot-qualified status after the 2018 gubernatorial election and all of its members in the state house lost reelection in the 2018 state house elections.

Jiletta Jarvis, a former gubernatorial candidate, attempted to form a new affiliate in 2021, and claimed to have support from Joe Bishop-Henchman, the chair of the national Libertarian Party, but Bishop-Henchman denied supporting her. Bishop-Henchman resigned after an unsuccessful vote to disaffiliate the existing LPNH and Jarvis handed control of party materials back to the existing affiliate.

Since 2020, the party has received coverage in the press for controversial, far-right, and antisemitic statements and death threats made by its Twitter account. Comments made by Jeremy Kauffman were particularly noteworthy; Kauffman was elected chairman of the party in March 2026. These actions have been criticized by Libertarian presidential nominees Gary Johnson and Chase Oliver. In September 2025, the Libertarian National Committee formally censured the state party, and in May 2026 they disaffiliated the party.

== History ==
=== 1970s ===
Libertarians in New Hampshire started working with Nelson Pryor, a member of the New Hampshire House of Representatives, on legislation in 1973. The LPNH held its organizational caucus on August 4, 1974, in Nashua. The party was founded by Arthur W. Ketchen, but Ketchen would later become critical of the party and endorsed Meldrim Thomson Jr. for governor in 1978 instead of the Libertarian candidate. The party passed a resolution at its 1977 convention condemning Anita Bryant for her anti-gay rights activities.

In the 1974 elections Ketchen ran for a seat in the state house with the Democratic nomination while other members of the party ran as independent candidates. The party endorsed John H. O'Brien for the Republican nomination in the 1st congressional district during the 1974 election. The party endorsed Edward Hewson for the Republican nomination in the 1st congressional district during the 1976 election, but later ran O'Brien in the general election as a Libertarian and had the endorsement of the American Party.

=== 1990s ===
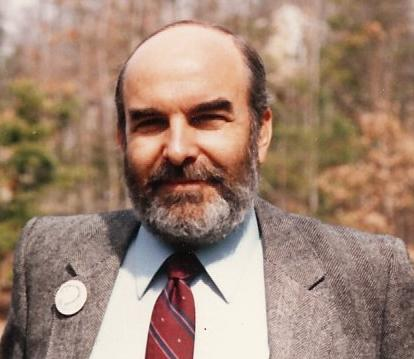
Andre Marrou won the party's presidential primary during the 1992 presidential election

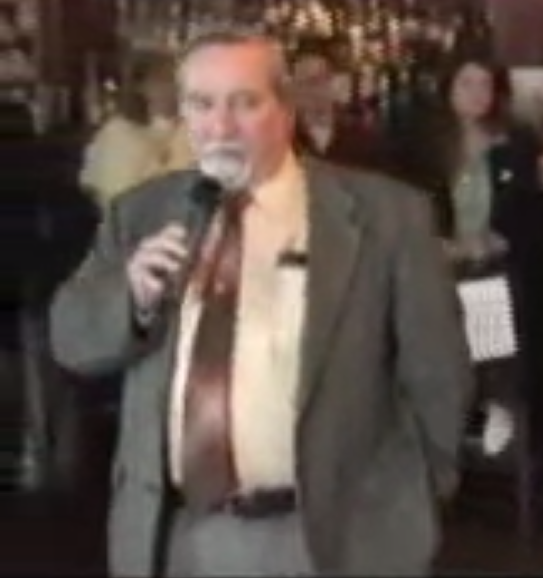
Don Gorman was the first leader of the Libertarian Party in the New Hampshire House of Representatives

The Libertarian Party gained qualified status after gaining more than three percent of the popular vote in the 1990 gubernatorial election. The party was ballot-qualified in New Hampshire from 1990 to 1996. During the 1992 presidential election the party held a presidential primary where Andre Marrou was the only option on the ballot and received 3,554 votes on the Libertarian ballot, 99 write-in votes in the Republican primary, and 67 write-in votes in the Democratic primary. During the 1992 presidential election the party held a presidential primary where Harry Browne won with 653 votes against Irwin Schiff's 336 votes, and 638 other write-in votes.

Calvin Warburton, who had served in the state house since 1978, changed his political affiliation from Republican to Libertarian and became a dues paying member on July 16, 1991. He stated that the Libertarians were the only one who stood for economic, personal, and social freedom and was critical of the Republicans for planning to create new taxes. On December 12, Representative Finlay Rothhaus changed his political affiliation from Republican to Libertarian. Rothhaus was critical of the Republicans for increasing government power, raising taxes, and increasing gun control. Representative Donald Roulston, who the party had attempted to recruit in 1989, but declined stating that he was "too much of an anarchist for you", changed his political affiliation from Republican to Libertarian in 1992. These three state representatives gave the Libertarian Party its largest number of state legislators for a third party since the Socialist Party of America had four state legislators elected in Connecticut in 1938.

The party elected four members to the state legislature during the 1992 elections. These legislators were aided through the use of electoral fusion in 1992 and 1994, where they would also gain the nomination of a major party in addition to the Libertarian nomination. The party ran eighty-five candidates in the 1992 state house election and ninety-one candidates in the 1994 state house election. Representative Don Gorman was selected to serve as the party's leader in the state house through winning a coin toss after the caucus was divided two to two between Gorman and Warburton. The Libertarian Caucus was recognized by the state house due to having more than three members, but lost its recognition after membership decreased to two in 1995. Representative Jim McLarin resigned on February 9, 1995, leaving Gorman as the only Libertarian in the state house. Gorman lost reelection in the 1996 election.

Miriam Luce defeated Warbuton for the Libertarian gubernatorial nomination for the 1992 election and received 4.00% of the vote in the election. Warburton, Steve Winter, and Clarence G. Blevens ran for the Libertarian gubernatorial nomination for the 1994 election which Winter, who later served in the state house as a Republican, won and later received 4.40% in the election. Robert Kingsbury defeated Blevens and Rotthaus for the Libertarian gubernatorial nomination for the 1996 election, but only received 1.20% in the election causing the party to lose its ballot-qualified status.

Despite the fact that the party was qualified in the state and had members elected to the state legislature, it was not allowed to have members serve as polling place officials. This was because only the two largest parties could have members serve as polling place officials. The party sued against this law; they lost the suit when Judge Bruce M. Selya ruled against them in Werme v. Merrill in 1996.

=== 2000s ===
Representative Steve Vaillancourt was given the Libertarian nomination after he lost renomination in the Democratic primary and won reelection during the 2000 election. During the 2008 United States presidential election the party nominated George Phillies for president and Karen Kwiatkowski for vice-president at its state convention. Both people declined the nomination and the party had to hold another convention. However, the party already petitioned to have Phillies appear on the general election ballot. He received 531 compared to the national presidential ticket of Bob Barr and Wayne Allyn Root which received 2,217 votes.

In 2001, Jason Sorens, a PhD student at Yale University, wrote an essay calling for the mass migration of 20,000 libertarians to a single, low-population state where they would have the ability to have electoral power and create a libertarian society. On October 1, 2003, the organization selected New Hampshire as the state they would move to. Governor Craig Benson supported the movement stating "come on up, we'd love to have you". The Free State Project reached its goal of 20,000 members in 2016, and by then around 1,900 members had already moved to New Hampshire.

=== 2010s ===
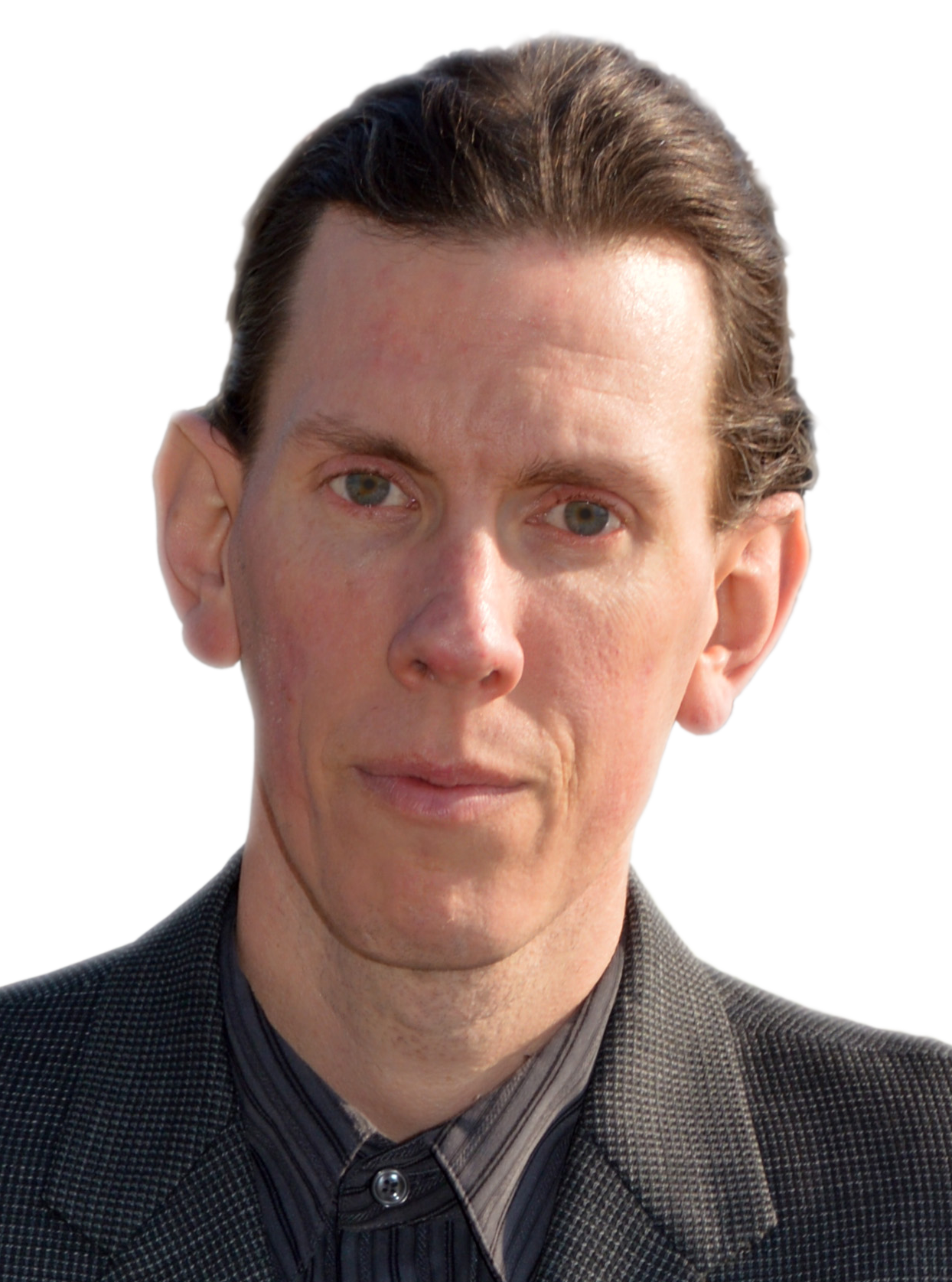
Darryl W. Perry served as chair of the party and was its gubernatorial nominee in the 2020 gubernatorial election.

Max Abramson, a Republican member of the state house, switched to the Libertarian Party in May 2016, and ran for governor of New Hampshire in the 2016 gubernatorial election in which he received 4.31% of the popular vote giving the Libertarian Party ballot-qualified status in New Hampshire. Abramson later changed his political affiliation to Republican. He was elected to the state house during the 2018 elections as a Republican; Abramson later changed his political affiliation back to Libertarian on June 28, 2019.

In 2016, the five-member executive committee of the party voted to adopt a resolution calling for the secession of New Hampshire from the United States. Roger Paxton, the vice-chairman of the party, stated that “Recognizing that libertarianism is defined as self-ownership, and recognizing that both our federal and state founding documents make it clear that we have the right of peaceful secession. I’m pleased that the Libertarian Party of New Hampshire has resolved its support”.

On February 9, 2017, Caleb Q. Dyer, a Republican member of the state house, changed his political affiliation to Libertarian. On May 10, Joseph Stallcop, a Democratic member of the state house, also switched his political affiliation to Libertarian bringing the Libertarian caucus to two members which entitled it to be recognized as a caucus and a room in the capitol. On June 27, the Libertarian Party announced at a press conference that Brandon Phinney, a Republican member of the state house, had changed his political affiliation to Libertarian. Stallcop later resigned from the state house on August 6, 2018.

The New Hampshire Secretary of State advised all town clerks that voters could register as members of the Libertarian Party on January 5, 2017, after the party had gained ballot-qualified status in the 2016 elections. During the 2018 elections both Libertarian gubernatorial candidates, Jiletta Jarvis and Aaron Day, alleged that Libertarians were being disenfranchised at polling places.

The party failed to receive 4% of the vote in the 2018 New Hampshire gubernatorial election causing it to lose its status in the state. Also both of the party's members in the state house lost reelection.

=== 2020s ===
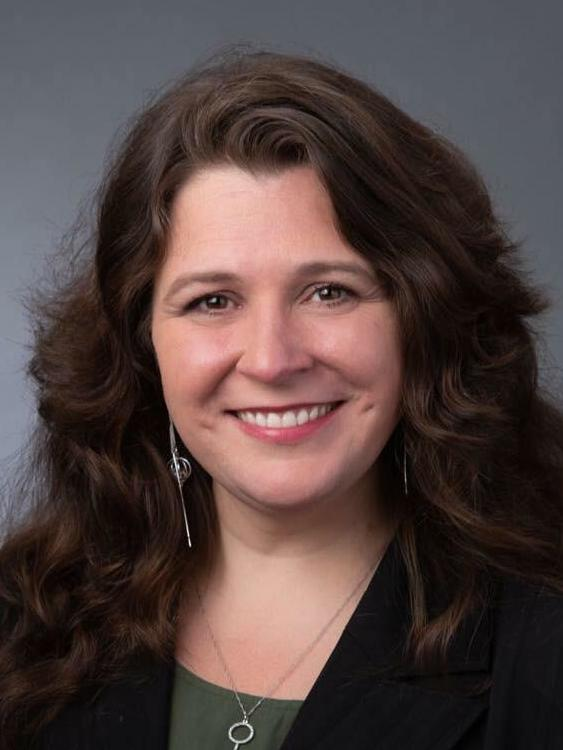
LPNH Chair Jilletta Jarvis

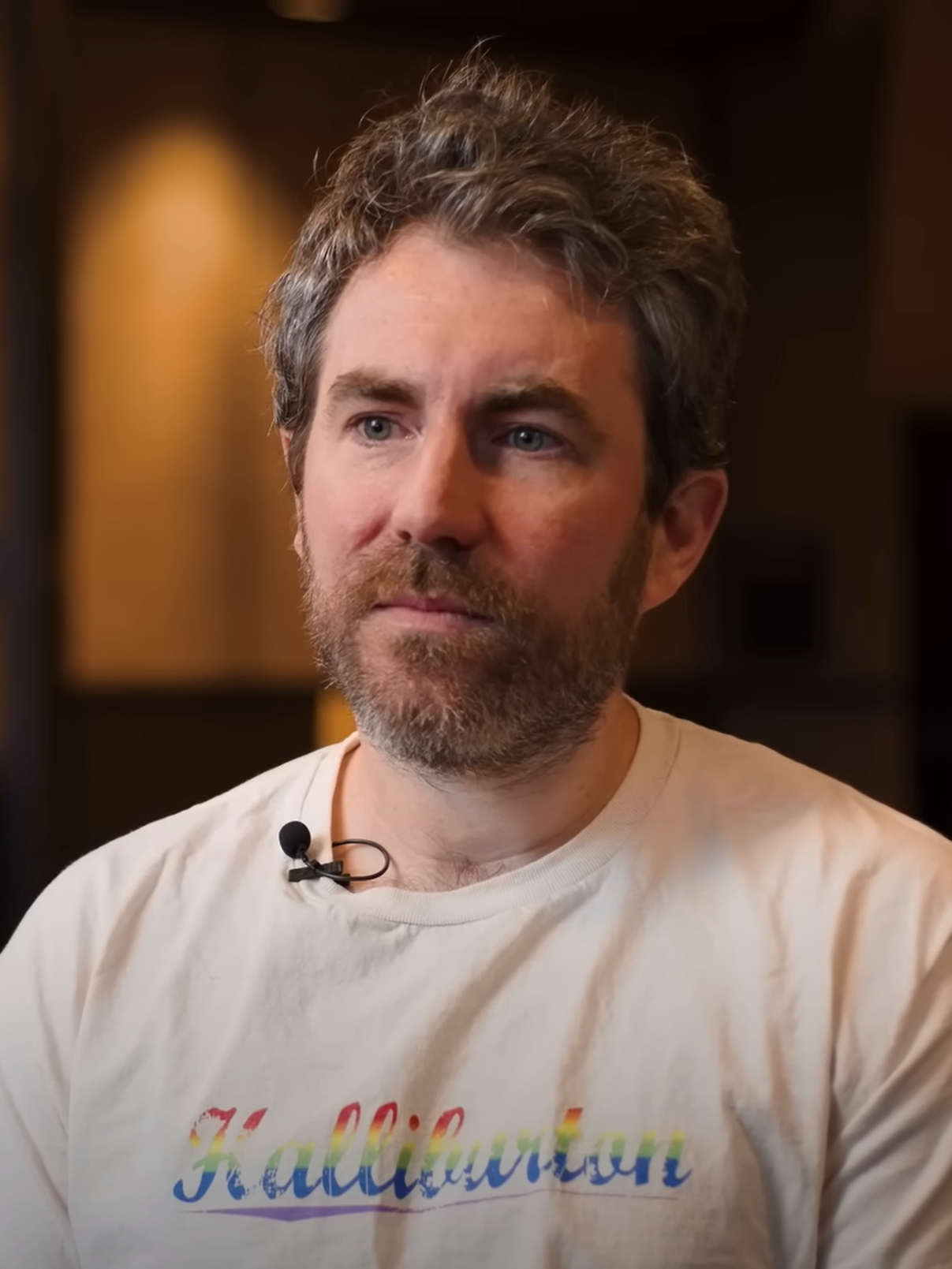
Jeremy Kauffman in May 2022

Avatar of Libertarian Party NH

Libertarian Party NH
(@LPNH)
tweeted:

Legalize child labor.
Children will learn more on a job site than in public school.

June 7, 2021

Avatar of Gov. Gary Johnson

Gov. Gary Johnson
(@GovGaryJohnson)
tweeted:

Replying to @LPNH

I'm sorry, but no.
This isn't what libertarianism means to millions of Americans – pushing a disturbing and out of touch stance on child labor is entirely detached from what people need in America today.
This does not advance liberty, or help change people's opinions.

June 7, 2021

During the 2020 presidential election the party administered its own primary independent of the state, which was won by Vermin Supreme. Forty-four ballots were cast in the party's presidential primary.

The Mises Caucus, which is opposed to the Pragmatist Caucus which was in control of the Libertarian Party, planned a takeover of the Libertarian Party and had gained control over 25 of the state parties. In 2021, the party's Twitter account voiced support for ending child labor laws and repealing the Civil Rights Act of 1964 which were criticized by Gary Johnson, the party's former presidential nominee. The tweets were written by Jeremy Kauffman, a member of the New Hampshire Libertarian Party's state executive committee. Joe Bishop-Henchman, the chair of the national Libertarian Party, alleged that Kauffman wrote about black people having lower IQs" and more murders of transgender people being "a good trade-off for lower taxes".

On June 12, Jarvis formed a new Libertarian Party of New Hampshire, took control of the old party's digital assets, and attempted to regain control of the party's Twitter account. Jarvis claimed support from Bishop-Henchman based on a letter he wrote her on June 7 recognizing her as chair of the Libertarian Party of New Hampshire. Bishop-Henchman denied supporting Jarvis' actions, pointing to the letter having been written several days before the dispute. The Libertarian National Committee voted twelve to two, with three abstaining, against a motion supported by Bishop-Henchman to disaffiliate the Libertarian Party of New Hampshire. Bishop-Henchman and two members of the Libertarian National Committee resigned after the motion failed. Jarvis returned control of the party's website and other digital assets on June 17. Former vice-presidential candidate Spike Cohen and former Representative Justin Amash criticized Jarvis' attempted takeover.

On Martin Luther King Day, the account claimed that black people are "in debt" to the United States because they "receive special federal funding due to race and are first-in-line for every college and every job." The tweet also referenced a false claim made by Donald Trump that authorities denied white people access to the COVID-19 vaccine because of their race. The tweet was deleted after it received criticism. In August and September 2022, the party tweeted a number of antisemitic remarks including "6 million dollar minimum wage or you’re antisemitic." They also compared Ukraine President Volodymyr Zelenskyy, who is Jewish, to Adolf Hitler. The party's account also posted tweets stating that "January 6th didn’t go far enough" and a variant of the white nationalist Fourteen Words that substituted the word "white" with "libertarian."

On July 18, in response to a tweet from Nina Turner advocating for free insulin and medicine, the party's Twitter account responded with a quote tweet stating, "Nina Turner picking crops should be free." Turner characterized this tweet as "racist and anti-Black." In two follow-up tweets, they stated that "'Insulin should be free' is equally offensive as calling for someone to be compelled to pick crops" and asserted that Turner "should pick crops as reparations for the rights [she] violated as a politician."

On the fourth anniversary of John McCain's death, the party's Twitter account posted a picture of his daughter Meghan crying at his funeral with the caption "Happy Holidays." In a follow-up tweet, they advocated for "dancing on the graves of war criminals" like John McCain. Meghan called the tweet "hideous" and said the photo represented the worst pain she had ever been in. Amash agreed with her and called the tweet "horrible" and "disgusting." The party's account responded by saying "Wait until you see what we tweet when the Clintons finally kick the bucket." Governor Chris Sununu stated on CNN that the tweets "should pretty much be the end of the Libertarian Party in New Hampshire".

Karlyn Borysenko was nominated as the party's gubernatorial candidate in the 2022 election while Kelly Halldorson ran in opposition to the party's removal of abortion rights from its platform and control by the Mises Caucus. Halldorson received more votes than Borysenko in the election.

In 2022, the Pragmatist Caucus associated with the 2012 and 2016 presidential campaigns of Gary Johnson dissolved in part due to the offensive messages posted by the Mises Caucus–controlled Libertarian Party of New Hampshire.

In September 2024, LPNH wrote on X that "Anyone who murders Kamala Harris would be an American hero." LPNH later deleted its tweet as it violated X's rules, while complaining about restricted speech: "Libertarians are truly the most oppressed minority." As a result of the post, LPNH was investigated by the FBI. The national Libertarian Party's presidential nominee, Chase Oliver, condemned the party's initial tweet, stating that it was "abhorrent and should never have been posted … As Libertarians, we condemn the use of force … We are dedicated to the principle of non-aggression and to peaceful solutions to conflict". The LPNH referred to Oliver as an "infiltrating leftist snake".

The LPNH opposed Chase Oliver, the national party's nominee for president in 2024. In June 2024, the LPNH rejected his candidacy and refused to offer any support although Oliver would still appear on the ballot. Kauffman endorsed Trump, but other Libertarians in the state, such as Nicholas Sarwark, still supported Oliver.

Bill Redpath, treasurer of the Libertarian National Committee, proposed a motion in May 2025, to censure the state parties of Colorado and New Hampshire. He stated that the LPNH had "cast the Libertarian Party in a bad light on the national stage" due to racist and inflammatory posts and that it violated the national bylaws by endorsing Trump. In September 2025, the state party was formally censured by the National Committee for "despicable conduct" regarding its Twitter account, and invited them to disaffiliate with the group.

In 2026, following a proposal by Democratic activist Andru Volinsky to lower property taxes by creating an income tax, LPNH issued a death threat, saying "under libertarian ethical theory, it is perfectly permissible to kill him". The threat was investigated by local police and the NH Attorney General. Following a statement condemning the post by Democratic congressional candidate Christian Urrutia, LPNH issued a threat against Urrutia, saying he should "leave New Hampshire while it's safe for you to do so".

Kauffman unsuccessfully ran for chair of the Libertarian Party at the 2026 national convention. The Libertarian National Committee (LNC) voted 15 to 2 in favor of disaffiliating the LPNH from the national party on May 25, 2026. The resolution cited that the LPNH undermined Libertarian candidates and supported anti-libertarian positions. The bylaws of the Libertarian Party prohibits affiliated state parties from endorsing non-Libertarian candidates.

In September 2026, the party made a social media post stating it openly supported the assassination of all elected Democrats in the state of New Hampshire, and that people should vote for the Republican Party if they didn't "have the balls" to do that. The National Libertarian Party criticized this post in a statement, saying that now the official Libertarian Party affiliate recognized in New Hampshire is called Granite State Libertarian Party. In October 2026 the X account of the party was suspended following a letter sent to X by New Hampshire governor Kelly Ayotte requesting its suspension due to the threats it had made against elected Democrats.

== Elected officials ==
=== Former ===
- Max Abramson – Member of the New Hampshire House of Representatives from the 20th Rockingham district (May 2016 – December 2016; June 2019 – 2020)
- Caleb Q. Dyer – Member of the New Hampshire House of Representatives from the 37th Hillsborough district (February 2017 – December 2018)
- Don Gorman – Member of the New Hampshire House of Representatives
- Brandon Phinney – Member of the New Hampshire House of Representatives from the 37th Hillsborough district (June 2017 – January 2019)
- Jim McClarin – Member of the New Hampshire House of Representatives
- Finlay Rothhaus – Member of the New Hampshire House of Representatives
- Donald Roulston – Member of the New Hampshire House of Representatives
- Joseph Stallcop – Member of the New Hampshire House of Representatives from the 4th Cheshire district (May 2017 – August 2018)
- Calvin Warburton – Member of the New Hampshire House of Representatives
- Steve Vaillancourt – Member of the New Hampshire House of Representatives

== Electoral performance ==
=== Presidential ===
President
Election year	Vote percentage	+/–	Votes	Presidential candidate	Vice presidential candidate	Result	Reference
1976	0.3 / 100	Steady	936	Roger MacBride	David Bergland	Lost	
1980	0.5 / 100	▲0.2	2,064	Ed Clark	David Koch	Lost	
1984	0.2 / 100	▼0.3	735	David Bergland	James A. Lewis	Lost	
1988	1.0 / 100	▲0.8	4,502	Ron Paul	Andre Marrou	Lost	
1992	0.7 / 100	▼0.3	3,548	Andre Marrou	Nancy Lord	Lost	
1996	0.9 / 100	▲0.2	4,214	Harry Browne	Jo Jorgensen	Lost	
2000	0.5 / 100	▼0.4	2,757	Harry Browne	Art Olivier	Lost	
2004	0.1 / 100	▼0.4	341	Michael Badnarik (write-in)	Richard Campagna (write-in)	Lost	
2008	0.4 / 100	▲0.3	2,748 (Note: The Phillies/Bennett ticket received 531 votes.)	Bob Barr (Note: George Phillies also appeared on the ballot as the Libertarian presidential candidate.)	Wayne Allyn Root (Note: Chris Bennett also appeared on the ballot as the Libertarian vice-presidential candidate.)	Lost	
2012	1.2 / 100	▲0.8	8,212	Gary Johnson	Jim Gray	Lost	
2016	4.1 / 100	▲3.0	30,777	Gary Johnson	Bill Weld	Lost	
2020	1.6 / 100	▼2.5	13,236	Jo Jorgensen	Spike Cohen	Lost	
2024	0.5 / 100	▼1.1	4,425	Chase Oliver	Mike ter Maat	Lost	

=== Congressional ===
United States Senate
Election year	Vote percentage	+/–	Votes	Senatorial candidate	No. of overall seats won	Result	Reference
1978	0.8 / 100	Steady	2,070	Craig Franklin	0 / 2	Steady	
1984	0.3 / 100	▼0.5	1,094	Saunder Primack	0 / 2	Steady	
1990	3.3 / 100	▲3.1	9,717	John G. Elsnau	0 / 2	Steady	
1992	3.5 / 100	Steady	18,214	Katherine M. Alexander	0 / 2	Steady	
1996	4.5 / 100	▲1.2	22,261	Ken Blevens	0 / 2	Steady	
1998	2.4 / 100	▼1.1	7,603	Brian Christeson	0 / 2	Steady	
2002	2.2 / 100	▼2.3	9,835	Ken Blevens	0 / 2	Steady	
2004	0.0 / 100	▼2.4	102	Ken Blevens (write-in)	0 / 2	Steady	
2008	3.1 / 100	▲0.9	21,516	Ken Blevens	0 / 2	Steady	
2010	1.1 / 100	▲1.0	4,753	Ken Blevens	0 / 2	Steady	
2014	0.0 / 100	▼3.1	0	None	0 / 2	Steady	
2016	1.7 / 100	▲0.7	12,597	Brian Chabot	0 / 2	Steady	
2020	2.3 / 100	▲2.3	18,421	Justin O'Donnell	0 / 2	Steady	

United States House of Representatives
Election year	Vote percentage	+/–	Votes	No. of overall seats won	+/–	Reference
1976	0.7 / 100	Steady	2,349	0 / 2	Steady	
1978	0.9 / 100	▲0.2	2,407	0 / 2	Steady	
1980	0.0 / 100	▼0.9	0	0 / 2	Steady	
1982	0.0 / 100	Steady	0	0 / 2	Steady	
1984	0.4 / 100	▲0.4	1,435	0 / 2	Steady	
1986	0.0 / 100	▼0.4	0	0 / 2	Steady	
1988	0.0 / 100	Steady	0	0 / 2	Steady	
1990	0.0 / 100	Steady	0	0 / 2	Steady	
1992	2.3 / 100	▲2.3	11,610	0 / 2	Steady	
1994	2.1 / 100	▼0.2	6,534	0 / 2	Steady	
1996	1.7 / 100	▼0.4	8,176	0 / 2	Steady	
1998	1.1 / 100	▼0.6	3,338	0 / 2	Steady	
2000	2.1 / 100	▲1.1	11,901	0 / 2	Steady	
2002	2.8 / 100	▲1.8	12,438	0 / 2	Steady	
2004	1.7 / 100	▼1.1	11,311	0 / 2	Steady	
2006	0.8 / 100	▼0.9	3,305	0 / 2	Steady	
2008	2.3 / 100	▲1.4	15,221	0 / 2	Steady	
2010	2.8 / 100	▲0.6	12,762	0 / 2	Steady	
2012	4.3 / 100	▲1.5	29,457	0 / 2	Steady	
2014	0.0 / 100	▼4.3	0	0 / 2	Steady	

=== Gubernatorial ===
Governor
Election year	Vote percentage	+/–	Votes	Gubernatorial candidate	Result	Reference
1978	0.5 / 100	▲0.5	1,217	Mabel G. Everett	Lost	
1980	0.3 / 100	▼0.1	1,318	James Pinnaird	Lost	
1982	0.0 / 100	▼0.3	0	None	Lost	
1984	0.0 / 100	Steady	0	None	Lost	
1986	0.0 / 100	Steady	0	None	Lost	
1988	0.5 / 100	▲0.5	2,216	Howard L. Wilson Jr.	Lost	
1990	4.9 / 100	▲4.4	14,348	Miriam F. Luce	Lost	
1992	4.0 / 100	▼0.9	20,663	Miriam F. Luce	Lost	
1994	4.4 / 100	▲0.4	13,709	Stephen Winter	Lost	
1996	1.2 / 100	▼3.2	5,974	Robert Kingsbury	Lost	
1998	0.0 / 100	▼1.2	0	None	Lost	
2000	1.1 / 100	▲1.1	6,446	John J. Babiarz	Lost	
2002	2.9 / 100	▲1.8	13,028	John J. Babiarz	Lost	
2004	0.0 / 100	▼2.9	0	None	Lost	
2006	0.1 / 100	▲0.1	323	Richard Kahn (write-in)	Lost	
2008	2.2 / 100	▲2.0	14,987	Susan Newell	Lost	
2010	2.2 / 100	▲0.0	10,089	John J. Babiarz	Lost	
2012	2.8 / 100	▲0.6	19,251	John J. Babiarz	Lost	
2014	0.0 / 100	▼2.8	0	None	Lost	
2016	4.3 / 100	▲4.3	31,243	Max Abramson	Lost	
2018	1.4 / 100	▼2.9	8,197	Jilletta Jarvis	Lost	
2020	1.4 / 100	Steady	11,329	Darryl Perry	Lost	
2022	0.45 / 100	▼0.95	2,772 (Note: Kelly Halldorson received 5,071 votes.)	Karlyn Borysenko (Note: Kelly Halldorson also appeared on the ballot as the Libertarian gubernatorial candidate.)	Lost	

== Voter registration ==
Year	RV.	%	Change
2017	120	(0.01%)	Steady
2018	1,154	(0.11%)	▲0.10%
2021	~160		
