= New Hampshire's 2nd congressional district =

U.S. House district for New Hampshire

Coordinates: 43°45′51″N 71°43′17″W

- Interactive map of district boundaries since January 3, 2023
- Representative: Maggie Goodlander; D–Nashua
- Distribution: 51.67% rural; 48.32% urban
- Population (2025): 707,453
- Median household income: $104,300
- Ethnicity: 87.0% White; 4.3% Hispanic; 4.1% Two or more races; 2.7% Asian; 1.2% Black; 0.7% other
- Cook PVI: D+2

New Hampshire's 2nd congressional district covers the western, northern, and some southern parts of New Hampshire. It includes the state's second-largest city, Nashua, as well as the state capital, Concord. It is currently represented in the United States House of Representatives by Democrat Maggie Goodlander.

The district is classified by the Census Bureau as a majority-rural district, with 51.67% of its population residing in rural areas. The district is home to Dartmouth College, the state's second-largest college, and three of its representatives since 1995 (Charles Bass, Paul Hodes, and Annie Kuster) have been Dartmouth alumni. Some of the largest employers in the district are Dartmouth–Hitchcock Medical Center, Dartmouth College, Southern New Hampshire Health System, and BAE Systems.

== History ==
Until 1847, New Hampshire's representatives were elected at large, from the entire state, and not from districts. Districts began being used in the 1846 elections. Until the 1878 elections, New Hampshire elected its members of the United States House of Representatives in March of the odd-numbered years. That would be too late for the beginning of the March 4 term, but the first session of the House typically didn't start until December; so, a March election wasn't a problem.

Historically, the second district has had strong Republican leanings, having voted Republican 71 times and Democrat only 15. The district has leaned Democratic in congressional races since 2006, and in presidential races since 2000.

== Composition ==
As of the 2021 redistricting cycle, the 2nd district contains 161 municipalities.

Belknap County (2)

Center Harbor, New Hampton

Carroll County (3)

Albany, Jackson, Sandwich

Cheshire County (23)

All 23 municipalities

Coös County (20)

All 20 municipalities

Grafton County (40)

All 40 municipalities

Hillsborough County (27)

Amherst, Antrim, Bennington, Brookline, Deering, Francestown, Greenfield, Greenville, Hancock, Hillsborough, Hollis, Hudson, Litchfield, Lyndeborough, Mason, Milford, Mont Vernon, Nashua, New Boston, New Ipswich, Pelham, Peterborough, Sharon, Temple, Weare, Wilton, Windsor

Merrimack County (26)

Allenstown, Andover, Boscawen, Bow, Bradford, Canterbury, Chichester, Concord, Danbury, Dunbarton, Epsom, Franklin, Henniker, Hill, Hopkinton, Loudon, New London, Newbury, Northfield, Pembroke, Pittsfield, Salisbury, Sutton, Warner, Webster, Wilmot

Rockingham County (5)

Atkinson, Deerfield, Northwood, Salem, Windham

Sullivan County (15)

All 15 municipalities

== Recent election results from statewide races ==
Year	Office	Results
2008	President	Obama 56–43%
2008	Senate	Shaheen 53–44%
2010	Senate	Ayotte 58–39%
2010	Governor	Lynch 54–43%
2012	President	Obama 55–45%
2012	Governor	Hassan 56–41%
2014	Governor	Hassan 54–46%
2014	Senate	Shaheen 54–46%
2016	President	Clinton 48–45%
2016	Senate	Hassan 49–47%
2016	Governor	Van Ostern 48–47%
2018	Governor	Sununu 51–48%
2020	President	Biden 54–45%
2020	Senate	Shaheen 57–40%
2020	Governor	Sununu 63–35%
2022	Senate	Hassan 54–44%
2022	Governor	Sununu 56–43%
2024	President	Harris 51–47%
2024	Governor	Ayotte 53–45%

== List of members representing the district ==
Representative	Party	Years	Cong ress	Electoral history
District established March 4, 1847
Charles H. Peaslee (Concord)	Democratic	March 4, 1847 – March 3, 1853	30th 31st 32nd	Elected late on March 9, 1847. Re-elected late on March 13, 1849. Re-elected late on March 11, 1851. Retired.
George W. Morrison (Manchester)	Democratic	March 4, 1853 – March 3, 1855	33rd	Elected late on March 8, 1853. Lost re-election.
Mason Tappan (Bradford)	Know Nothing	March 4, 1855 – March 3, 1857	34th	Elected late on March 13, 1855. Re-elected late on March 10, 1857. Re-elected late on March 8, 1859. Retired.
Mason Tappan (Bradford)	Republican	March 4, 1857 – March 3, 1861	35th 36th	Elected late on March 13, 1855. Re-elected late on March 10, 1857. Re-elected late on March 8, 1859. Retired.
Edward H. Rollins (Concord)	Republican	March 4, 1861 – March 3, 1867	37th 38th 39th	Elected late on March 12, 1861. Re-elected late on March 10, 1863. Re-elected late on March 14, 1865. Retired.
Aaron Fletcher Stevens (Nashua)	Republican	March 4, 1867 – March 3, 1871	40th 41st	Elected late on March 12, 1867. Re-elected late on March 9, 1869. Lost re-election.
Samuel Newell Bell (Manchester)	Democratic	March 4, 1871 – March 3, 1873	42nd	Elected late on March 14, 1871. Lost re-election.
Austin F. Pike (Franklin)	Republican	March 4, 1873 – March 3, 1875	43rd	Elected late on March 11, 1873. Retired.
Samuel Newell Bell (Manchester)	Democratic	March 4, 1875 – March 3, 1877	44th	Elected late on March 9, 1875. Retired.
James F. Briggs (Manchester)	Republican	March 4, 1877 – March 3, 1883	45th 46th 47th	Elected late on March 13, 1877. Re-elected in 1878. Re-elected in 1880. Retired.
Ossian Ray (Lancaster)	Republican	March 4, 1883 – March 3, 1885	48th	Redistricted from the 3rd district and re-elected in 1882. Retired.
Jacob H. Gallinger (Concord)	Republican	March 4, 1885 – March 3, 1889	49th 50th	Elected in 1884. Re-elected in 1886. Retired.
Orren C. Moore (Nashua)	Republican	March 4, 1889 – March 3, 1891	51st	Elected in 1888. Lost re-election.
Warren F. Daniell (Franklin)	Democratic	March 4, 1891 – March 3, 1893	52nd	Elected in 1890. Retired.
Henry Moore Baker (Bow)	Republican	March 4, 1893 – March 3, 1897	53rd 54th	Elected in 1892. Re-elected in 1894. Retired.
Frank Gay Clarke (Peterborough)	Republican	March 4, 1897 – January 9, 1901	55th 56th	Elected in 1896. Re-elected in 1898. Retired and died before next term began.
Vacant		January 9, 1901 – March 3, 1901	56th	
Frank Dunklee Currier (Canaan)	Republican	March 4, 1901 – March 3, 1913	57th 58th 59th 60th 61st 62nd	Elected in 1900. Re-elected in 1902. Re-elected in 1904. Re-elected in 1906. Re-elected in 1908. Re-elected in 1910. Lost re-election.
Raymond Bartlett Stevens (Landaff)	Democratic	March 4, 1913 – March 3, 1915	63rd	Elected in 1912. Retired to run for U.S. Senator.
Edward Hills Wason (Nashua)	Republican	March 4, 1915 – March 3, 1933	64th 65th 66th 67th 68th 69th 70th 71st 72nd	Elected in 1914. Re-elected in 1916. Re-elected in 1918. Re-elected in 1920. Re-elected in 1922. Re-elected in 1924. Re-elected in 1926. Re-elected in 1928. Re-elected in 1930. Retired.
Charles W. Tobey (Temple)	Republican	March 4, 1933 – January 3, 1939	73rd 74th 75th	Elected in 1932. Re-elected in 1934. Re-elected in 1936. Retired to run for U.S. Senator.
Foster Waterman Stearns (Hancock)	Republican	January 3, 1939 – January 3, 1945	76th 77th 78th	Elected in 1938. Re-elected in 1940. Re-elected in 1942. Retired to run for U.S. Senator.
Sherman Adams (Lincoln)	Republican	January 3, 1945 – January 3, 1947	79th	Elected in 1944. Retired to run for Governor of New Hampshire.
Norris Cotton (Lebanon)	Republican	January 3, 1947 – November 7, 1954	80th 81st 82nd 83rd	Elected in 1946. Re-elected in 1948. Re-elected in 1950. Re-elected in 1952. Retired to run for U.S. senator and resigned when elected.
Vacant		November 7, 1954 – January 3, 1955	83rd	
Perkins Bass (Peterborough)	Republican	January 3, 1955 – January 3, 1963	84th 85th 86th 87th	Elected in 1954. Re-elected in 1956. Re-elected in 1958. Re-elected in 1960. Retired to run for U.S. Senator.
James Colgate Cleveland (New London)	Republican	January 3, 1963 – January 3, 1981	88th 89th 90th 91st 92nd 93rd 94th 95th 96th	Elected in 1962. Re-elected in 1964. Re-elected in 1966. Re-elected in 1968. Re-elected in 1970. Re-elected in 1972. Re-elected in 1974. Re-elected in 1976. Re-elected in 1978. Retired.
Judd Gregg (Greenfield)	Republican	January 3, 1981 – January 3, 1989	97th 98th 99th 100th	Elected in 1980. Re-elected in 1982. Re-elected in 1984. Re-elected in 1986. Retired to run for Governor of New Hampshire.
Chuck Douglas (Concord)	Republican	January 3, 1989 – January 3, 1991	101st	Elected in 1988. Lost re-election.
Dick Swett (Bow)	Democratic	January 3, 1991 – January 3, 1995	102nd 103rd	Elected in 1990. Re-elected in 1992. Lost re-election.
Charles Bass (Peterborough)	Republican	January 3, 1995 – January 3, 2007	104th 105th 106th 107th 108th 109th	Elected in 1994. Re-elected in 1996. Re-elected in 1998. Re-elected in 2000. Re-elected in 2002. Re-elected in 2004. Lost re-election.
Paul Hodes (Concord)	Democratic	January 3, 2007 – January 3, 2011	110th 111th	Elected in 2006. Re-elected in 2008. Retired to run for U.S. Senator.
Charles Bass (Peterborough)	Republican	January 3, 2011 – January 3, 2013	112th	Elected in 2010. Lost re-election.
Ann McLane Kuster (Hopkinton)	Democratic	January 3, 2013 – January 3, 2025	113th 114th 115th 116th 117th 118th	Elected in 2012. Re-elected in 2014. Re-elected in 2016. Re-elected in 2018. Re-elected in 2020. Re-elected in 2022. Retired.
Maggie Goodlander (Nashua)	Democratic	January 3, 2025 – present	119th	Elected in 2024. Re-elected in 2026.

== Electoral history ==
For current election, see 2024 United States House of Representatives elections in New Hampshire

=== 2012 ===
New Hampshire's 2nd congressional district, 2012
Party	Candidate	Votes	%
Democratic	Ann McLane Kuster	169,275	50.2
Republican	Charles Bass (incumbent)	152,977	45.3
Libertarian	Hardy Macia	14,936	4.4
n/a	Write-ins	206	0.1
Total votes		337,394	100.0
Democratic gain from Republican			

=== 2014 ===
New Hampshire's 2nd congressional district, 2014
Party	Candidate	Votes	%
Democratic	Ann McLane Kuster (incumbent)	130,700	54.9
Republican	Marilinda Garcia	106,871	44.9
n/a	Write-ins	613	0.2
Total votes		238,184	100.0
Democratic hold			

=== 2016 ===
New Hampshire's 2nd congressional district, 2016
Party	Candidate	Votes	%
Democratic	Ann McLane Kuster (incumbent)	174,495	49.7
Republican	Jim Lawrence	158,973	45.3
Independent	John Babiarz	17,088	4.9
n/a	Write-ins	236	0.1
Total votes		350,792	100.0
Democratic hold			

=== 2018 ===
New Hampshire's 2nd congressional district, 2018
Party	Candidate	Votes	%
Democratic	Ann McLane Kuster (incumbent)	155,358	55.5
Republican	Steve Negron	117,990	42.2
Libertarian	Justin O'Donnell	6,206	2.2
n/a	Write-ins	151	0.1
Total votes		279,705	100.0
Democratic hold			

=== 2020 ===
New Hampshire's 2nd congressional district, 2020
Party	Candidate	Votes	%
Democratic	Ann McLane Kuster (incumbent)	207,863	53.91
Republican	Steve Negron	168,491	43.70
Libertarian	Andrew Olding	9,093	2.36
N/A	Scatter	147	0.04
Total votes		385,594	100.0
Democratic hold			

=== 2022 ===
New Hampshire's 2nd congressional district, 2022
Party	Candidate	Votes	%
Democratic	Annie Kuster (incumbent)	171,636	55.80
Republican	Robert Burns	135,579	44.08
Write-in		369	0.12
Total votes		307,584	100.0
Democratic hold			

=== 2024 ===
New Hampshire's 2nd congressional district, 2024
Party	Candidate	Votes	%	±%
Democratic	Maggie Goodlander	211,641	52.93	−1.87
Republican	Lily Tang Williams	187,810	46.97	+1.89
Write-in		367	0.10	N/A
Total votes		399,818	100.0	
Democratic hold				

== Historical district boundaries ==
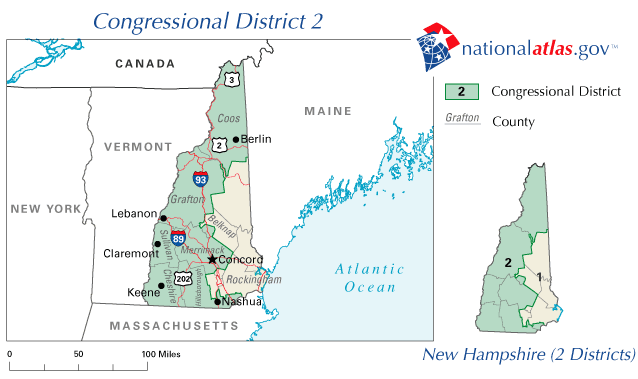
2003–2013

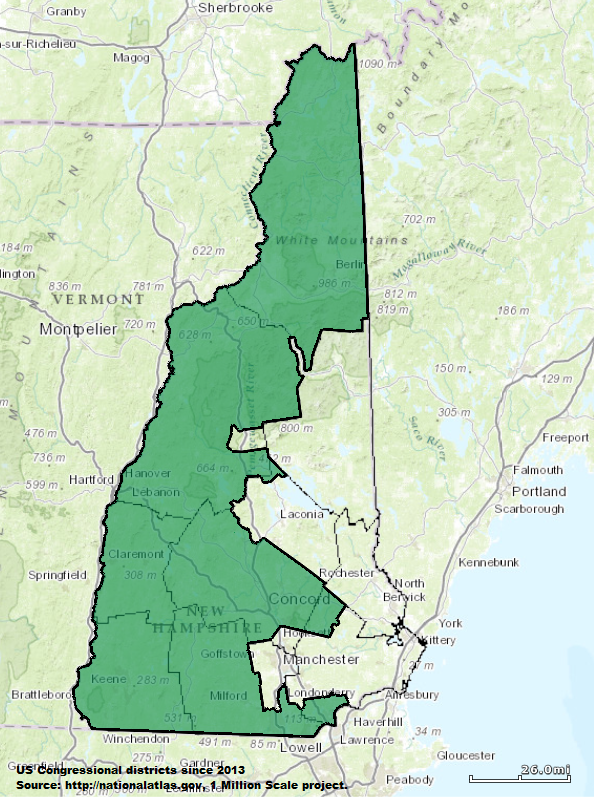
2013–2023

== See also ==
- New Hampshire's 1st congressional district
- New Hampshire's congressional districts
- List of United States congressional districts
