= 2000 Libertarian National Convention =

United States political event

- 2000 presidential election

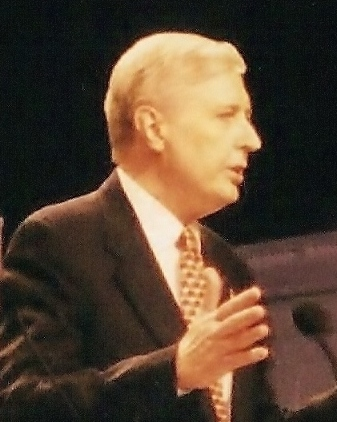
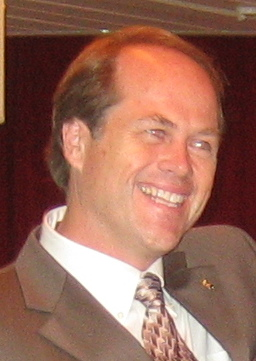
- Nominees; Browne and Olivier

Convention
- Dates: June 30 – July 4, 2000
- City: Anaheim, California

Candidates
- Presidential nominee: Harry Browne of Tennessee
- Vice-presidential nominee: Art Olivier of California
- Other candidates: Don Gorman of New Hampshire; Jacob Hornberger of Virginia

The 2000 Libertarian National Convention was held in Anaheim, California, from June 30 to July 4, 2000. Harry Browne was again chosen as the party's presidential nominee, becoming the first Libertarian Party candidate to be nominated twice for president.

The theme of the 2000 convention was "America's Future: Liberty, Responsibility, & Community."

The Libertarian Party holds a national convention every two years to vote on party bylaws, platform and resolutions and elect national party officers and a judicial committee. Every four years it nominates presidential and vice presidential candidates.

== Speakers ==
Those who attended include:

- Harry Browne
- Barry Hess, Director of the Hess Foundation Trust
- Don Gorman
- Dave Hollist
- Gary Nolan, syndicated talk radio host
- Russell Means, Indian Rights advocate
- Jack Gargan, former Reform Party National Chairman
- Carla Howell, Massachusetts candidate for U.S. Senate
- Neal Boortz, national syndicated radio talk show host
- David Nolan, Libertarian Party founder
- Michael Cloud, U.S. House Candidate
- David Bergland, then-Libertarian Party National Chair
- Dean Ahmad
- Barbara Howe, Libertarian candidate for Governor of North Carolina
- Michael Tanner of the Cato Institute
- Mark Skousen
- David Thibodeau, author of A Place Called Waco: A Survivor's Story

== Voting for presidential nomination ==
=== First ballot ===
Harry Browne was elected on the first ballot, gathering a majority of the voting delegates and securing the nomination.

2000 Libertarian Party National Convention total vote count: Round 1
Candidate	Total votes cast	Percent of votes cast
Harry Browne	493	56.2%
Don Gorman	166	18.9%
Jacob Hornberger	120	13.7%
Barry Hess	53	6.4%
None of the Above	23	2.6%
Write-In (scattered)	15	1.7%
Dave Hollist	8	0.9%
	Color key: / 1st place / 2nd place / 3rd place / 4th place / 5th place / 6th place / 7th place	

== Voting for vice presidential nomination ==
A separate vote was held for the vice presidential nomination. Former Bellflower, California Mayor, Art Olivier was nominated on the second ballot.

=== First ballot ===
After the first round, the rules were suspended, and a motion carried to only allow the top two candidates to appear on the second ballot.

2000 Libertarian Party National Convention total vote count: Round 1
Candidate	Total votes cast	Percent of votes cast
Art Olivier	333	44.0%
Steve Kubby	303	40.0%
Ken Krawchuk	70	9.3%
Don Gorman	29	3.8%
None of the Above	10	1.3%
Gail Lightfoot	7	0.1%
Write-In (scattered)	7	0.1%
	Color key: / 1st place / 2nd place / 3rd place / 4th place	

=== Second ballot ===
Art Oliver defeated Steve Kubby on the second ballot, securing the Libertarian Party nomination for Vice President.

2000 Libertarian Party National Convention total vote count: Round 2
Candidate	Total votes cast	Percent of votes cast
Art Olivier	418	55.3%
Steve Kubby	338	44.7%
	Color key: / 1st place / 2nd place	

== See also ==
- Libertarian National Convention
- Other parties' presidential nominating conventions of 2000:
  - Green
  - Democratic
  - Republican
- Libertarian Party of Colorado
- U.S. presidential election, 2000
