= New Hampshire's 1st congressional district =

U.S. House district for New Hampshire

Coordinates: 43°27′28″N 71°11′57″W

- Interactive map of district boundaries since January 3, 2023
- Representative: Chris Pappas; D–Manchester
- Distribution: 69.55% urban; 30.45% rural
- Population (2025): 707,889
- Median household income: $110,095
- Ethnicity: 87.3% White; 4.3% Hispanic; 3.8% Two or more races; 2.5% Asian; 1.5% Black; 0.6% other
- Cook PVI: D+2

New Hampshire's 1st congressional district covers parts of Southern New Hampshire and the eastern portion of the state. The district contains parts of Hillsborough, Rockingham, Merrimack, Grafton, and Belknap counties; and the entirety of Strafford and Carroll counties.

The district contains Manchester, New Hampshire's most populous city, and its immediate suburbs. Most of the district's population resides in Rockingham County, which includes much of the Seacoast Region. The northern part of the district in Belknap, Carroll, and Grafton counties are far more rural.

The district is home to the University of New Hampshire, the state's largest university. Some of the largest employers in the district are Fidelity Investments, J. Jill, Elliot Health System, and The University System of New Hampshire.

Democrat Chris Pappas has represented the district since 2019 in the United States House of Representatives. In 2026, Pappas chose to seek election to the United States Senate. Democratic candidate Stefany Shaheen won the 2026 election to represent the district in 2027.

The district was identified as a presidential bellwether district by Sabato's Crystal Ball, having voted for the Electoral College winner in the past four presidential elections as of 2020. In 2024, the district voted for Kamala Harris, even though she lost the election.

== History ==
This district is competitive, with a Cook Partisan Voting Index of D+2. During the mid-2000s and the 2010s, the district was extremely competitive, having changed hands in five of the last eight elections, with an incumbent losing reelection each time. The streak was broken in 2020 when incumbent Democrat Chris Pappas won reelection; he later won reelection again in 2022, becoming the first representative elected to a third consecutive term in the district since John E. Sununu. The district was a presidential bellwether starting in 2000, voting for the winner by narrow margins each time until 2024, when Kamala Harris narrowly carried the district.

== Composition ==
As of the 2021 redistricting cycle, the 1st district contains 74 municipalities.

Belknap County (9)

Alton, Barnstead, Belmont, Gilford, Gilmanton, Laconia, Meredith, Sanbornton, Tilton

Carroll County (15)

Bartlett, Brookfield, Chatham, Conway, Eaton, Effingham, Freedom, Hart's Location, Madison, Moultonborough, Ossipee, Tamworth, Tuftonboro, Wakefield, Wolfeboro

Hillsborough County (4)

Bedford, Goffstown, Manchester, Merrimack

Merrimack County (1)

Hooksett

Rockingham County (32)

Auburn, Brentwood, Candia, Chester, Danville, Derry, East Kingston, Epping, Exeter, Fremont, Greenland, Hampstead, Hampton, Hampton Falls, Kensington, Kingston, Londonderry, New Castle, Newfields, Newington, Newmarket, Newton, North Hampton, Nottingham, Plaistow, Portsmouth, Raymond, Rye, Sandown, Seabrook, South Hampton, Stratham

Strafford County (13)

All 13 municipalities

== Recent election results from statewide races ==
Year	Office	Results
2008	President	Obama 53–46%
2008	Senate	Shaheen 50–47%
2010	Senate	Ayotte 62–34%
2010	Governor	Lynch 51–47%
2012	President	Obama 51–49%
2012	Governor	Hassan 53–44%
2014	Governor	Hassan 51–49%
2014	Senate	Brown 51–49%
2016	President	Trump 48–46%
2016	Senate	Ayotte 49–47%
2016	Governor	Sununu 50–45%
2018	Governor	Sununu 55–44%
2020	President	Biden 52–46%
2020	Senate	Shaheen 56–42%
2020	Governor	Sununu 67–32%
2022	Senate	Hassan 53–45%
2022	Governor	Sununu 58–40%
2024	President	Harris 50–48%
2024	Governor	Ayotte 54–44%

== List of members representing the district ==
Representative	Party	Years	Cong ress	Electoral history
District established March 4, 1847
Amos Tuck (Exeter)	Independent	March 4, 1847 – March 3, 1849	30th 31st 32nd	Elected late on March 9, 1847. Re-elected late on March 13, 1849. Re-elected late on March 11, 1851. Lost re-election.
Amos Tuck (Exeter)	Free Soil	March 4, 1849 – March 3, 1851	30th 31st 32nd	Elected late on March 9, 1847. Re-elected late on March 13, 1849. Re-elected late on March 11, 1851. Lost re-election.
Amos Tuck (Exeter)	Whig	March 4, 1851 – March 3, 1853	30th 31st 32nd	Elected late on March 9, 1847. Re-elected late on March 13, 1849. Re-elected late on March 11, 1851. Lost re-election.
George W. Kittredge (Newmarket)	Democratic	March 4, 1853 – March 3, 1855	33rd	Elected late on March 8, 1853. Lost re-election.
James Pike (Sanbornton Bridge)	Know Nothing	March 4, 1855 – March 3, 1857	34th 35th	Elected late on March 13, 1855. Re-elected late on March 10, 1857. Retired.
James Pike (Sanbornton Bridge)	Republican	March 4, 1857 – March 3, 1859	34th 35th	Elected late on March 13, 1855. Re-elected late on March 10, 1857. Retired.
Gilman Marston (Exeter)	Republican	March 4, 1859 – March 3, 1863	36th 37th	Elected late on March 8, 1859. Re-elected late on March 12, 1861. Retired to serve in the Union Army.
Daniel Marcy (Portsmouth)	Democratic	March 4, 1863 – March 3, 1865	38th	Elected late on March 10, 1863. Lost re-election.
Gilman Marston (Exeter)	Republican	March 4, 1865 – March 3, 1867	39th	Elected late on March 14, 1865. Lost re-election.
Jacob Hart Ela (Rochester)	Republican	March 4, 1867 – March 3, 1871	40th 41st	Elected late on March 12, 1867. Re-elected late on March 9, 1869. Retired.
Ellery Albee Hibbard (Laconia)	Democratic	March 4, 1871 – March 3, 1873	42nd	Elected late on March 14, 1871. Lost re-election.
William B. Small (New Market)	Republican	March 4, 1873 – March 3, 1875	43rd	Elected late on March 11, 1873. Retired.
Frank Jones (Portsmouth)	Democratic	March 4, 1875 – March 3, 1879	44th 45th	Elected late on March 9, 1875. Re-elected late on March 13, 1877. Retired.
Joshua G. Hall (Dover)	Republican	March 4, 1879 – March 3, 1883	46th 47th	Elected in 1878. Re-elected in 1880. Retired.
Martin Alonzo Haynes (Lake Village)	Republican	March 4, 1883 – March 3, 1887	48th 49th	Elected in 1882. Re-elected in 1884. Lost re-election.
Luther F. McKinney (Manchester)	Democratic	March 4, 1887 – March 3, 1889	50th	Elected in 1886. Lost re-election.
Alonzo Nute (Farmington)	Republican	March 4, 1889 – March 3, 1891	51st	Elected in 1888. Retired to run for Governor of New Hampshire.
Luther F. McKinney (Manchester)	Democratic	March 4, 1891 – March 3, 1893	52nd	Elected in 1890. Retired to run for Governor of New Hampshire.
Henry W. Blair (Manchester)	Republican	March 4, 1893 – March 3, 1895	53rd	Elected in 1892. Retired.
Cyrus A. Sulloway (Manchester)	Republican	March 4, 1895 – March 3, 1913	54th 55th 56th 57th 58th 59th 60th 61st 62nd	Elected in 1894. Re-elected in 1896. Re-elected in 1898. Re-elected in 1900. Re-elected in 1902. Re-elected in 1904. Re-elected in 1906. Re-elected in 1908. Re-elected in 1910. Lost re-election.
Eugene Elliott Reed (Manchester)	Democratic	March 4, 1913 – March 3, 1915	63rd	Elected in 1912. Lost re-election.
Cyrus A. Sulloway (Manchester)	Republican	March 4, 1915 – March 11, 1917	64th 65th	Re-elected in 1914. Re-elected in 1916. Died.
Vacant		March 11, 1917 – May 29, 1917	65th	
Sherman Everett Burroughs (Manchester)	Republican	May 29, 1917 – January 27, 1923	65th 66th 67th	Elected to finish Sulloway's term. Re-elected in 1918. Re-elected in 1920. Retired and died before next term began.
Vacant		January 27, 1923 – March 3, 1923	67th	
William Nathaniel Rogers (Sanbornville)	Democratic	March 4, 1923 – March 3, 1925	68th	Elected in 1922. Lost re-election.
Fletcher Hale (Laconia)	Republican	March 4, 1925 – October 22, 1931	69th 70th 71st 72nd	Elected in 1924. Re-elected in 1926. Re-elected in 1928. Re-elected in 1930. Died.
Vacant		October 22, 1931 – January 5, 1932	72nd	
William Nathaniel Rogers (Sanbornville)	Democratic	January 5, 1932 – January 3, 1937	72nd 73rd 74th	Elected to finish Hale's term. Re-elected in 1932. Re-elected in 1934. Retired to run for U.S. Senator.
Arthur B. Jenks (Manchester)	Republican	January 3, 1937 – June 9, 1938	75th	Elected in 1936. Lost election contest.
Alphonse Roy (Manchester)	Democratic	June 9, 1938 – January 3, 1939	75th	Successfully contested Jenks's election. Lost re-election.
Arthur B. Jenks (Manchester)	Republican	January 3, 1939 – January 3, 1943	76th 77th	Re-elected in 1938. Re-elected in 1940. Lost renomination.
Chester Earl Merrow (Center Ossipee)	Republican	January 3, 1943 – January 3, 1963	78th 79th 80th 81st 82nd 83rd 84th 85th 86th 87th	Elected in 1942. Re-elected in 1944. Re-elected in 1946. Re-elected in 1948. Re-elected in 1950. Re-elected in 1952. Re-elected in 1954. Re-elected in 1956. Re-elected in 1958. Re-elected in 1960. Retired to run for U.S. Senator.
Louis C. Wyman (Manchester)	Republican	January 3, 1963 – January 3, 1965	88th	Elected in 1962. Lost re-election.
Joseph Oliva Huot (Laconia)	Democratic	January 3, 1965 – January 3, 1967	89th	Elected in 1964. Lost re-election.
Louis C. Wyman (Manchester)	Republican	January 3, 1967 – December 31, 1974	90th 91st 92nd 93rd	Elected in 1966. Re-elected in 1968. Re-elected in 1970. Re-elected in 1972. Retired to run for U.S. senator and resigned when appointed. (Note: The previous senator Norris Cotton resigned after election and governor Meldrim Thomson appointed him to the vacant term. Wyman lost the special election.)
Vacant		December 31, 1974 – January 3, 1975	93rd	
Norman D'Amours (Manchester)	Democratic	January 3, 1975 – January 3, 1985	94th 95th 96th 97th 98th	Elected in 1974. Re-elected in 1976. Re-elected in 1978. Re-elected in 1980. Re-elected in 1982. Retired to run for U.S. Senator.
Bob Smith (Tuftonboro)	Republican	January 3, 1985 – December 7, 1990	99th 100th 101st	Elected in 1984. Re-elected in 1986. Re-elected in 1988. Retired to run for U.S. Senator, but resigned when appointed.
Vacant		December 7, 1990 – January 3, 1991	101st	
Bill Zeliff (Jackson)	Republican	January 3, 1991 – January 3, 1997	102nd 103rd 104th	Elected in 1990. Re-elected in 1992. Re-elected in 1994. Retired to run for Governor of New Hampshire.
John E. Sununu (Bedford)	Republican	January 3, 1997 – January 3, 2003	105th 106th 107th	Elected in 1996. Re-elected in 1998. Re-elected in 2000. Retired to run for U.S. Senator.
Jeb Bradley (Wolfeboro)	Republican	January 3, 2003 – January 3, 2007	108th 109th	Elected in 2002. Re-elected in 2004. Lost re-election.
Carol Shea-Porter (Rochester)	Democratic	January 3, 2007 – January 3, 2011	110th 111th	Elected in 2006. Re-elected in 2008. Lost re-election.
Frank Guinta (Manchester)	Republican	January 3, 2011 – January 3, 2013	112th	Elected in 2010. Lost re-election.
Carol Shea-Porter (Rochester)	Democratic	January 3, 2013 – January 3, 2015	113th	Re-elected in 2012. Lost re-election.
Frank Guinta (Manchester)	Republican	January 3, 2015 – January 3, 2017	114th	Re-elected in 2014. Lost re-election.
Carol Shea-Porter (Rochester)	Democratic	January 3, 2017 – January 3, 2019	115th	Re-elected in 2016. Retired.
Chris Pappas (Manchester)	Democratic	January 3, 2019 – present	116th 117th 118th 119th	Elected in 2018. Re-elected in 2020. Re-elected in 2022. Re-elected in 2024. Retired to run for U.S. Senator.
Stefany Shaheen (Portsmouth)	Democratic	Assuming office on January 3, 2027		Elected in 2026.

== Electoral history ==
=== 2012 ===
2012 New Hampshire's 1st congressional district election
Party	Candidate	Votes	%
Democratic	Carol Shea-Porter	171,650	49.7
Republican	Frank Guinta (incumbent)	158,659	46.0
Libertarian	Brendan Kelly	14,521	4.2
n/a	Write-ins	192	0.1
Total votes		345,022	100.0
Democratic gain from Republican			

=== 2014 ===
2014 New Hampshire's 1st congressional district election
Party	Candidate	Votes	%
Republican	Frank Guinta	125,508	51.7
Democratic	Carol Shea-Porter (incumbent)	116,769	48.1
n/a	Write-ins	459	0.2
Total votes		242,736	100.0
Republican gain from Democratic			

=== 2016 ===
2016 New Hampshire's 1st congressional district election
Party	Candidate	Votes	%
Democratic	Carol Shea-Porter	162,080	44.3
Republican	Frank Guinta (incumbent)	157,176	42.9
Independent	Shawn O' Connor	34,735	9.5
Independent	Brendan Kelly	6,074	1.7
Libertarian	Robert Lombardo	5,507	1.5
n/a	Write-ins	412	0.1
Total votes		365,984	100.0
Democratic gain from Republican			

=== 2018 ===
2018 New Hampshire's 1st congressional district election
Party	Candidate	Votes	%
Democratic	Chris Pappas	155,884	53.6
Republican	Eddie Edwards	130,996	45.0
Libertarian	Dan Belforti	4,048	1.4
n/a	Write-ins	111	0.0
Total votes		291,039	100.0
Democratic hold			

=== 2020 ===
2020 New Hampshire's 1st congressional district election
Party	Candidate	Votes	%
Democratic	Chris Pappas (incumbent)	205,606	51.32
Republican	Matt Mowers	185,159	46.21
Libertarian	Zachary Dumont	9,747	2.43
N/A	Scatter	149	0.04
Total votes		400,661	100.0
Democratic hold			

=== 2022 ===
2022 New Hampshire's 1st congressional district election
Party	Candidate	Votes	%
Democratic	Chris Pappas (incumbent)	167,391	54.00
Republican	Karoline Leavitt	142,229	45.89
Write-in		342	0.11
Total votes		309,962	100.0
Democratic hold			

=== 2024 ===
2024 New Hampshire's 1st congressional district election
Party	Candidate	Votes	%
Democratic	Chris Pappas (incumbent)	218,577	54.00
Republican	Russell Prescott	185,936	45.93
Write-in		295	0.07
Total votes		404,808	100.0
Democratic hold			

== Historical district boundaries ==
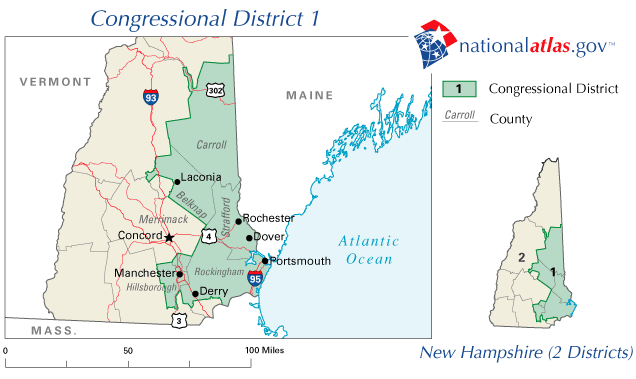
2003–2013

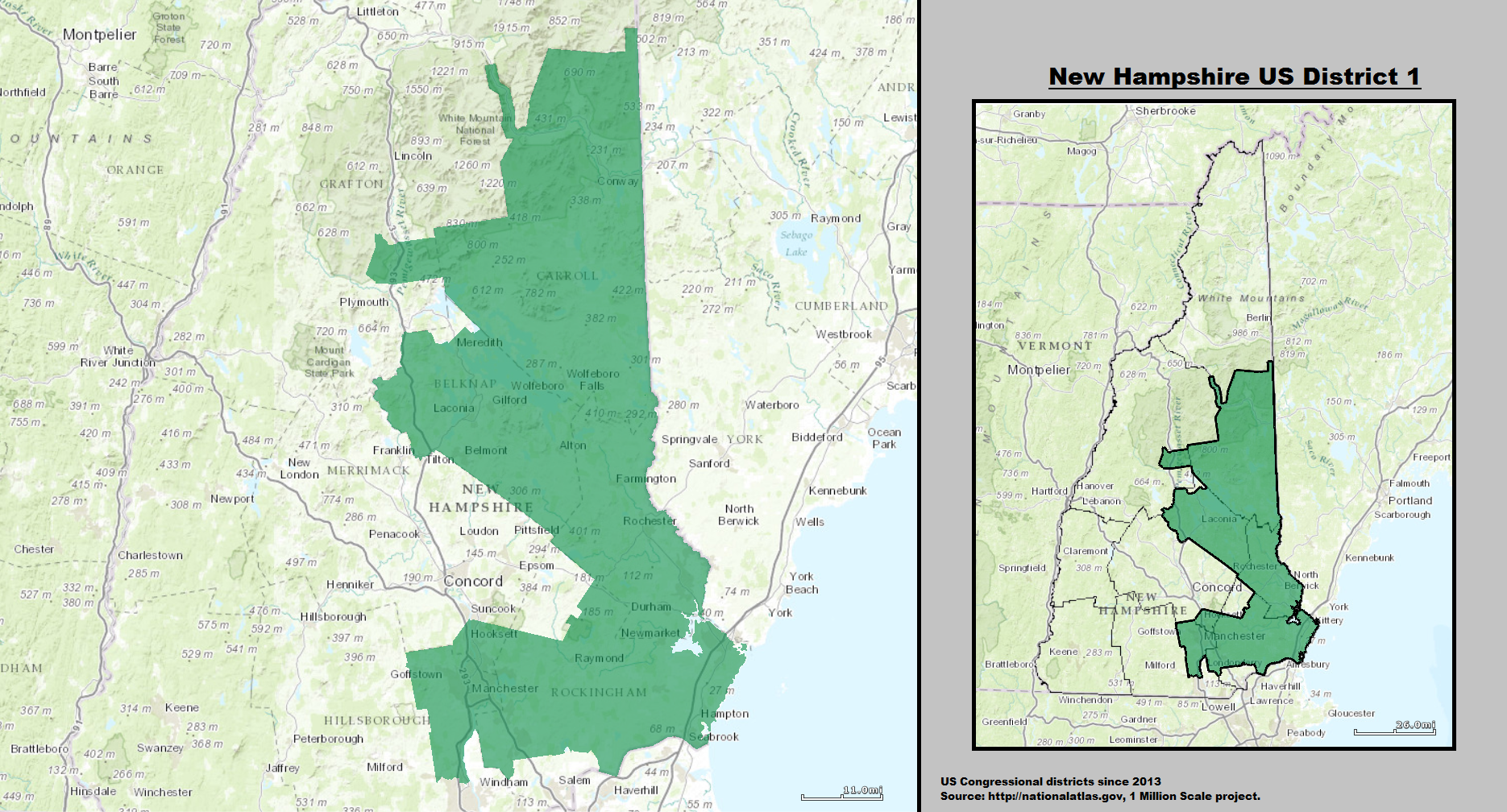
2013–2023

== See also ==
- New Hampshire's congressional districts
- List of United States congressional districts
