= Caleb Q. Dyer =

American politician (born 1996)

Hon. Caleb Q. Dyer
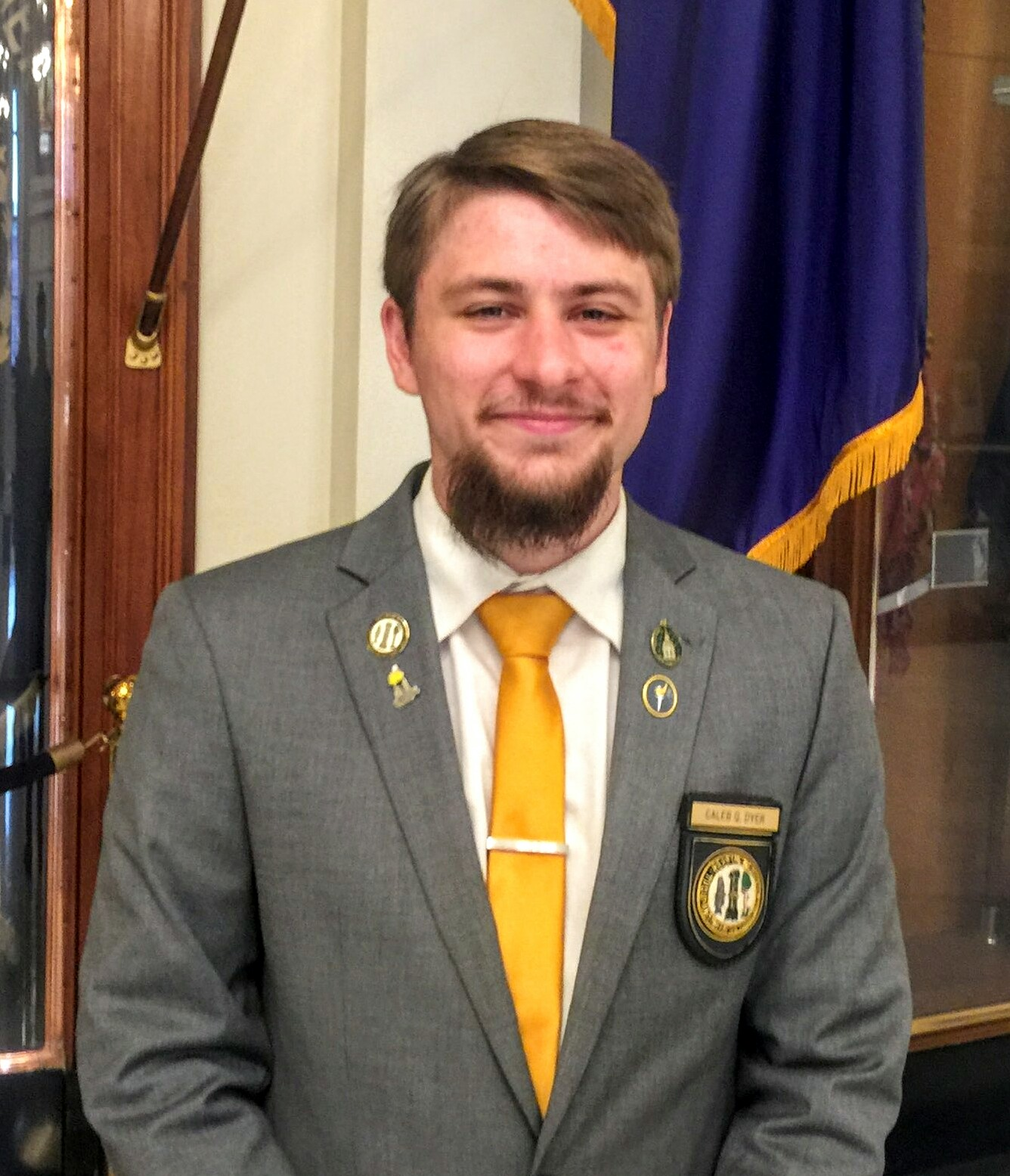

Member of the New Hampshire House of Representatives from the Hillsborough 37 district
- In office December 7, 2016 – December 5, 2018

Personal details
- Born: May 5, 1996 (age 30) Stoneham, Massachusetts
- Party: Libertarian (2017–present)
- Other political affiliations: Republican (2015–2017)
- Salary: $100/year

Secretary of the New Hampshire Libertarian State Committee
- Incumbent
- Assumed office 2018
- Preceded by: Brian Shields
- Committees: Environment and Agriculture
- Website: Campaign website

Caleb Q. Dyer (born May 5, 1996) is an American politician and a former member of the New Hampshire House of Representatives. He was first elected to the chamber in 2016 as a Republican. On February 9, 2017, Dyer switched his party affiliation to Libertarian. He served on the House Environment and Agriculture Committee, and as the House Libertarian Floor Leader.

== Personal life ==
Caleb Dyer was born in Stoneham, Massachusetts, on May 5, 1996, to Mitchell Edmund Dyer and Elizabeth Erica Dyer (née Swenson). For a brief period, his family lived in Everett, Massachusetts, before moving to New Hampshire. In the late 1990s, his family moved to Hudson, New Hampshire, where he was raised. He attended Hills-Garrison Elementary School, Hudson Memorial Middle School, and Alvirne High School. He graduated from Alvirne High School in 2015 after being held back a year. While a student at Alvirne, he was a member of the B Naturals, a select jazz choir, which had the honor of performing the national anthem before the New Hampshire House of Representatives. He is also a former member of Boy Scout Troop 21 in Hudson. He spends a great deal of time producing music with his friends and loves to cook for them as well.

== Political career ==
=== Electoral history ===
On June 1, 2016, Dyer filed to run as a Republican candidate for the New Hampshire House of Representatives from Hillsborough County's 37th district. By the end of the filing period, there were 17 Republican candidates. On September 13, 2016, he was elected one of the eleven Republican nominees for the office of Representative. On November 8, 2016, Dyer was one of the eleven candidates elected to the office of Representative. During this campaign, Dyer claimed to have spent approximately $400. There is no way to verify this claim as New Hampshire does not require the filing of campaign finance reports for those candidates (or committees) receiving or spending less than $500.

Dyer ran for reelection as a Libertarian in 2018 and lost, garnering 0.8% of the vote and winning fewer votes than all candidates on the Republican and Democratic tickets.

=== Party history ===
On February 9, 2017, Rep. Dyer announced at a press conference at the Legislative Office Building that he had officially changed his voter registration from Republican to Libertarian. In his address, he cited concerns with House Republican leadership, stating: "Instead of embracing this division (of the majority) and building a coalition from it, the leadership has alienated a growing portion of the electorate that installed them."

=== House Libertarian Caucus ===
On May 10, 2017, following the announcement by Rep. Joseph Stallcop that he had changed his party affiliation and registration to Libertarian, Rep. Dyer announced that the two representatives had re-established the House Libertarian Caucus and made plans to meet regularly in the Legislative Office Building prior to each regular session of the House. In Dyer's statement, he declared that the caucus would be open to "any and all legislators who find themselves in a similar situation to where we had found ourselves. The Libertarian Party welcomes all who have the courage and conviction to think and live freely."

Dyer sponsored bills during his term that would have eliminated the emissions test requirement for motor vehicles, abolished the death penalty, created a business tax credit for paid parental leave, allowed minors over 16 years old to independently consent to medical procedures, reduced criminal penalties for possession of illegal drugs and certain violations of occupational licensing laws, switched to approval voting in elections, made ballot access easier for smaller political parties, and allowed political parties to opt out of primary elections, in New Hampshire. Dyer also sponsored a bill to legalize recreational marijuana use, which passed in late 2017.

== See also ==
- Max Abramson
- Brandon Phinney
- Joseph Stallcop
