= Nelson Pryor =

American politician (1942–2025)

Member of the New Hampshire House of Representatives
- In office December 1972 – December 1974 Serving with Romeo Desilets
- Constituency: Coös 7th

Personal details
- Born: April 26, 1942 Blaine, Maine, U.S.
- Died: January 1, 2025 (aged 82) Madison, Florida, U.S.
- Party: Democratic
- Parents: Harry E. Pryor (father); Verna P. Estabrook (mother)

Nelson A. Pryor (April 26, 1942 – January 1, 2025) was an American politician from the state of New Hampshire.

== Life and career ==
Born in Blaine, Maine, the son of Harry E. and Verna P. (née Estabrook) Pryor, he grew up in Bridgewater, Maine, and graduated from Houlton High School in 1960. He attended Ricker College, San Diego State College, and the University of Maine, earning a master of education in 1974. He served in the U.S. Army National Guard from 1962 to 1970, and as a high school teacher in Berlin, New Hampshire, from 1968 to 1972. He got involved in local politics, becoming secretary-treasurer of a group called Democrats Against the Income Tax and being named as a candidate for delegate for Los Angeles Mayor Sam Yorty in the 1972 New Hampshire Democratic presidential primary, although Yorty would only take 6% in the primary and none of his delegates were elected. At the age of 30, Pryor was elected as a member of the New Hampshire House of Representatives from the Coös 7th district, and he would serve one term from 1972 to 1974, serving as a Democrat. He would then go to Washington, D.C., as a research analyst for lobbying organizations.

Pryor retired to Madison County, Florida in 2000, becoming known locally as a conservative Republican. He died in Madison on January 1, 2025, at the age of 82.
