= Calvin Warburton =

American politician (1910–1995)

Calvin Warburton (May 28, 1910 – October 16, 1995) is a former member of the New Hampshire House of Representatives. He represented Raymond as a member of the Libertarian Party, having left the Republican Party in 1991.

== Early life and career ==
Warburton grew up in Lynn, Massachusetts and worked as a military chaplain in World War II, Korea and Germany, then in the National Guard.

== Political career ==
Entering politics at the age of 66, Warburton ran for the U.S. House of Representatives in New Hampshire's 1st congressional district in 1976. In 1991, Warburton unsuccessfully ran for the 1992 Libertarian vice presidential nomination. Warburton sought the party's nomination for Governor of New Hampshire in 1992 and 1994.

== See also ==
- Libertarian Party of New Hampshire
