= 1992 United States House of Representatives elections in New Hampshire =

- November 3, 1992

All 2 New Hampshire seats to the United States House of Representatives
	Majority party	Minority party
Party	Democratic	Republican
Last election	1	1
Seats won	1	1
Seat change	Steady	Steady
Popular vote	265,906	227,063
Percentage	52.03%	44.43%
Democratic
60–70%
Republican
50–60%

The 1992 congressional elections in New Hampshire were held on November 3, 1992. They determined who would represent the state of New Hampshire in the United States House of Representatives. Representatives are elected for two-year terms; those elected served in the 103rd Congress from January 1993 until January 1995. New Hampshire has two seats in the House, apportioned according to the 1990 United States census.

== Overview ==
United States House of Representatives elections in New Hampshire, 1992
Party	Votes	Percentage	Seats	+/–
Democratic	265,906	52.03%	1	-
Republican	227,063	44.43%	1	-
Libertarian	11,610	2.27%	0	-
Natural Law	2,655	0.52%	0	-
Others	3,806	0.74%	0	-
Totals	511,040	100.00%	2	-

== District 1 ==
1992 New Hampshire's 1st congressional district election
Party	Candidate	Votes	%
Republican	Bill Zeliff (incumbent)	135,936	53.13%
Democratic	Bob Preston	108,578	42.44%
Libertarian	Knox Bickford	5,633	2.20%
Independent	Richard F. Bosa	3,537	1.38%
Natural Law	Linda Spitzfaden	1,997	0.78%
Write-in		172	0.07%
Total votes		255,853	100.00%
Republican hold			

== District 2 ==
1992 New Hampshire's 2nd congressional district election
Party	Candidate	Votes	%
Democratic	Dick Swett (incumbent)	157,328	61.65%
Republican	Bill Hatch	91,127	35.71%
Libertarian	John A. Lewicke	5,977	2.34%
Natural Law	James J. Bingham	658	0.26%
Write-in		97	0.04%
Total votes		255,187	100.00%
Democratic hold			
