= Andy Borsa =

American politician (1944–2016)

Andrew J. Borsa (1944 – March 7, 2016) was a member of the New Hampshire House of Representatives. He was first elected in 1992 to represent Pelham. Borsa was elected as a member of the Libertarian Party.

== See also ==
- Libertarian Party of New Hampshire

New Hampshire House of Representatives
Preceded by Nancy M. Ford; Robert A. Daigle; Arthur Ferlan	Member of the New Hampshire House of Representatives from the Hillsborough 24th district 1992–1994	Succeeded by Michael F. Marcinkowski
