= 2000 United States House of Representatives elections in New Hampshire =

- November 7, 2000

All 2 New Hampshire seats to the United States House of Representatives
	Majority party	Minority party
Party	Republican	Democratic
Last election	2	0
Seats won	2	0
Seat change	Steady	Steady
Popular vote	303,190	238,754
Percentage	54.53%	42.94%
Swing	▼5.36%	▲3.89%
- Republican 50–60%

The 2000 congressional elections in New Hampshire were held on November 7, 2000, to determine who will represent the state of New Hampshire in the United States House of Representatives. It coincided with the state's gubernatorial elections. Representatives are elected for two-year terms; those elected served in the 107th Congress from January 2001 until January 2003. New Hampshire has two seats in the House, apportioned according to the 2000 United States census.

== Overview ==
United States House of Representatives elections in New Hampshire, 2000
Party	Votes	Percentage	Seats	+/–
Republican	303,190	54.53%	2	-
Democratic	238,754	42.94%	0	-
Libertarian	11,901	2.14%	0	-
Constitution	2,204	0.40%	0	-
Totals	556,049	100.00%	2	-

== District 1 ==
2000 New Hampshire's 1st congressional district election
- November 7, 2000

Nominee	John E. Sununu	Martha Fuller Clark
Party	Republican	Democratic
Popular vote	150,609	128,387
Percentage	52.9%	45.1%
U.S. Representative before election
John E. Sununu
Republican
Elected U.S. Representative
John E. Sununu
Republican

John E. Sununu won the election with 52.9% of the vote.

=== General election ===
==== Results ====
New Hampshire's 1st congressional district election, 2000
Party	Candidate	Votes	%
Republican	John E. Sununu	150,609	52.9
Democratic	Martha Fuller Clark	128,387	45.1
Libertarian	Dan Belforti	5,713	2.0
Total votes		284,709	100.0
Republican hold			

== District 2 ==
2000 New Hampshire's 2nd congressional district election
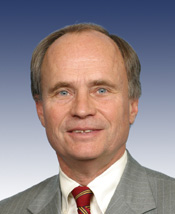

Nominee	Charles F. Bass	Barney Brannen
Party	Republican	Democratic
Popular vote	152,581	110,367
Percentage	56.2%	40.7%
- County results Bass: 50–60% 60–70%
U.S. Representative before election
Charles Bass
Republican
Elected U.S. Representative
Charles F. Bass
Republican

=== Polling ===
Poll source	Date(s)	Sample size	Margin of error	Charles Bass (R)	Barney Brannen (D)	Other / undecided (Note: Calculated by taking the difference of 100% and all other candidates combined.)
Research 2000	October 31, 2000	600	—	47%	36%	17%

Results

New Hampshire's 2nd congressional district election, 2000
Party	Candidate	Votes	%
Republican	Charles F. Bass	152,581	56.23%
Democratic	Barney Brannen	110,367	40.67%
Libertarian	Brian Christeson	6,188	2.28%
Constitution	Roy Kendel	2,204	0.81%
Total votes		271,340	100.00%
