= 1962 United States Senate election in New Hampshire =

- November 6, 1962
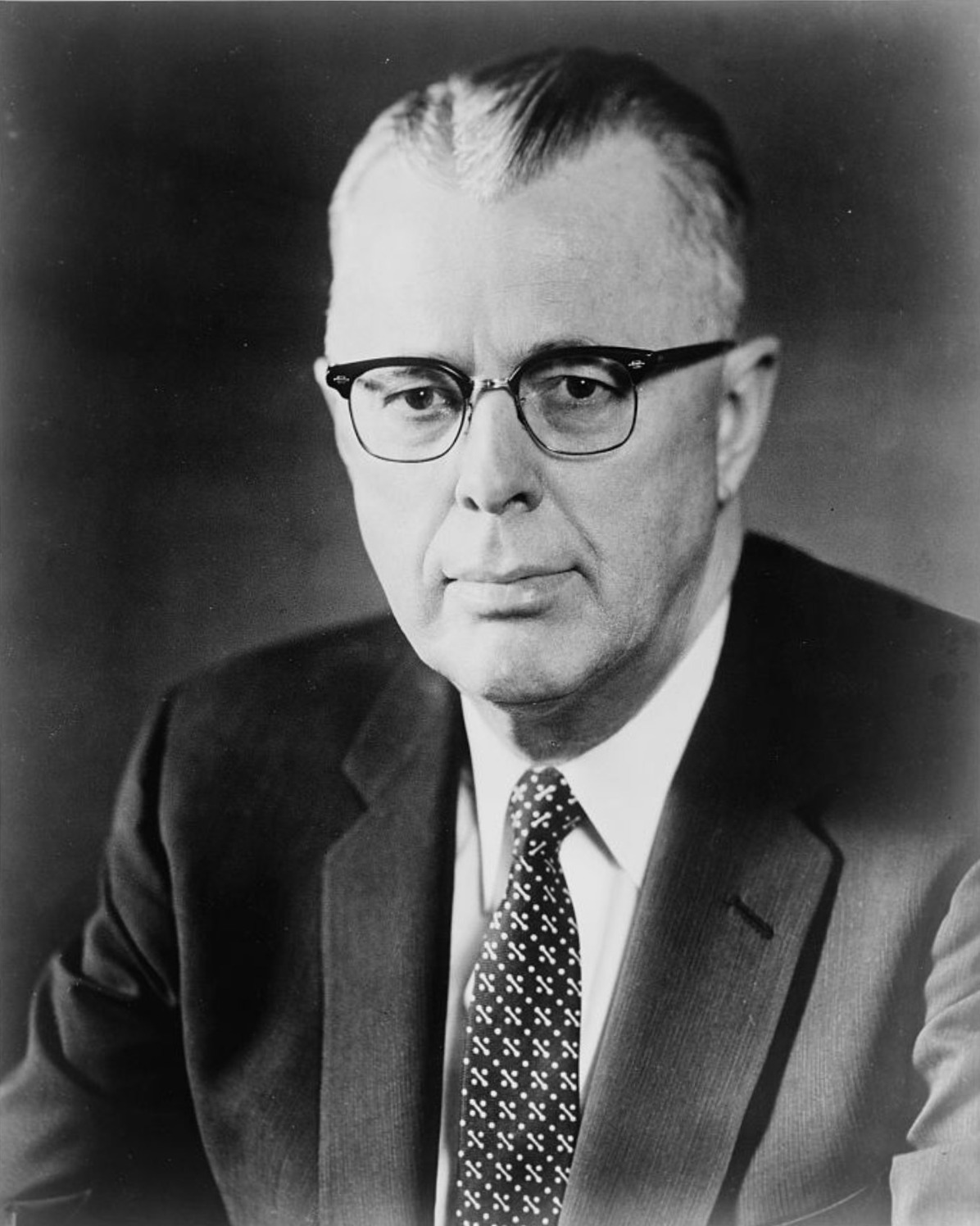

Nominee	Norris Cotton	Alfred Catalfo Jr.
Party	Republican	Democratic
Popular vote	134,035	90,444
Percentage	59.71%	40.29%
- Cotton: 50–60% 60–70% 70–80% 80–90% >90% Catalfo: 50–60% 60–70% 70–80%
U.S. senator before election
Norris Cotton
Republican
Elected U.S. Senator
Norris Cotton
Republican

The 1962 United States Senate election in New Hampshire took place on November 6, 1962. Incumbent Republican Senator Norris Cotton won re-election to a second full term.

== Primary elections ==
Primary elections were held on September 11, 1962.

=== Democratic primary ===
==== Candidates ====
- Alfred Catalfo Jr., attorney

==== Results ====
Democratic primary results
Party	Candidate	Votes	%
Democratic	Alfred Catalfo Jr.	22,402	100.00
Total votes		22,402	100.00

=== Republican primary ===
==== Candidates ====
- Norris Cotton, incumbent United States Senator
- Norman A. LePage, accountant

==== Results ====
Republican primary results
Party	Candidate	Votes	%
Republican	Norris Cotton (Incumbent)	87,445	94.42
Republican	Norman A. LePage	5,167	5.58
Total votes		92,612	100.00

== General election ==
=== Results ===
1962 United States Senate election in New Hampshire
Party	Candidate	Votes	%
Republican	Norris Cotton (Incumbent)	134,035	59.71
Democratic	Alfred Catalfo Jr.	90,444	40.29
Majority		43,591	19.42
Turnout		224,479	
Republican hold			

== See also ==
- 1962 United States Senate elections

== Bibliography ==
- Congressional Elections, 1946-1996. Washington, D.C.: Congressional Quarterly Inc. 1998. ISBN 1-56802-248-4.
- Stark, Robert L., ed. (1963). Manual for the General Court of New Hampshire. Vol. 38. Concord, NH: Department of State, New Hampshire.
- Scammon, Richard M., ed. (1964). America Votes 5: a handbook of contemporary American election statistics, 1962. Washington, D.C.: Governmental Affairs Institute.
