= Finlay Rothhaus =

American politician

Finlay C. Rothhaus

Member of the Merrimack Town Council
- Incumbent
- Assumed office 2008

Chair of the Merrimack Town Council
- In office 2017–2019
- Succeeded by: Thomas Koenig

Vice Chair Merrimack town council
- Incumbent
- Assumed office 2021

Member of the Marrimack Selectboard
- In office 1995–2001

Member of the New Hampshire House of Representatives from the Hillsborough 12 district
- In office 1991–1995

Personal details
- Born: 1956 (age 69–70)
- Party: Libertarian (1991–present); Republican (until 1990)
- Education: Southern New Hampshire University, University of New Hampshire

Finlay C. Rothhaus (born 1956) is a former member of the New Hampshire House of Representatives. He represented Merrimack from 1991 until 1995 as a member of the Libertarian Party and is a current member of the Merrimack Town Council.

== Early and personal life ==
Rothhaus graduated from Merrimack High School in 1975, and went on to attend Southern New Hampshire University and the University of New Hampshire. He also spent three years in the U.S. Army. As of 2006 he had been married 20 years with three children. Outside politics Rothhaus worked as a servicer of spas and swimming pools.

== Career ==
Having originally been elected as a member of the Republican Party in 1990, Rothhaus joined the Libertarian Party in 1991. The next year he was re-elected as a Libertarian. He went on to serve on the Merrimack selectboard from 1995 until 2001. In 2001 he unsuccessfully ran for a seat on the Merrimack school board. In October 2003 he was sworn in for a six-month term as a member of Merrimack's ethics committee. In May 2015 he endorsed Rand Paul's 2016 presidential campaign. As of 2017 he is a member of the Merrimack Town Council, serving a three-year term that will expire in 2020.

== See also ==
- Libertarian Party of New Hampshire
