= Don Gorman =

American politician

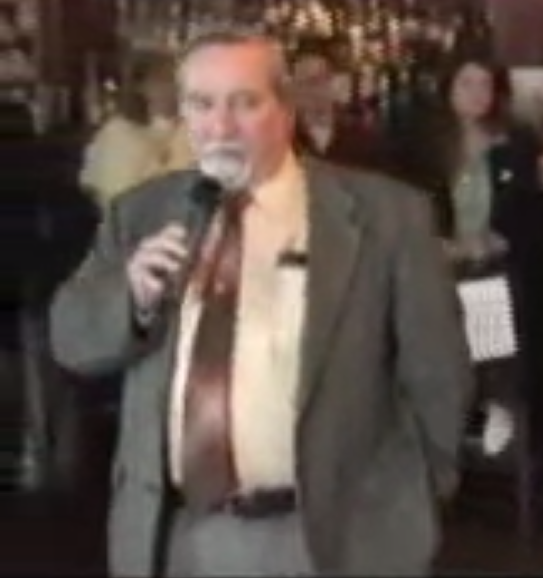
Gorman in 2010

Donald Gorman (born 1937 or 1938) is a former member of the New Hampshire House of Representatives. He was first elected in 1992 to represent Deerfield and was re-elected in 1994, serving four terms. Gorman was elected to the New Hampshire House as a member of the Libertarian Party. In 2002 he was elected as an at-large member of the Libertarian National Committee. He also worked as a chimney sweep.

== Career ==
In 1993, Gorman introduced legislation that would permit banks to grant grace periods on mortgages and to revise the terms of mortgages, to avoid homelessness as a result of foreclosure. In the same year, he drafted a bill to repeal the state's business enterprise tax. In 1994, Gorman sponsored a resolution warning of the dissolution of the United States federal government in the event of the national debt reaching $6 trillion; and sponsored legislation that would broaden New Hampshire's definition of a political party to include all parties that had received three percent of the vote in an election for governor, the U.S. Congress or the Executive Council of New Hampshire.

In 1994, Gorman served as the chair of the Libertarian Party of New Hampshire. In 2000, he sought the Libertarian Party's presidential nomination, which ultimately went to investment banker and 1996 nominee Harry Browne. In 2005, as the political director of the New Hampshire Liberty Alliance, Gorman led tours of the New Hampshire State House and trained members of the Free State Project in the politics of New Hampshire.

Gorman was elected to the Deerfield School Board in 2002.
