= 1998 United States House of Representatives elections in New Hampshire =

- November 5, 1998

All 2 New Hampshire seats to the United States House of Representatives
	Majority party	Minority party
Party	Republican	Democratic
Last election	2	0
Seats won	2	0
Seat change	Steady	Steady
Popular vote	303,190	238,754
Percentage	59.89%	39.05%
Swing	▲9.59%	▼6.03%
- Republican 50–60% 60–70%

The 1998 congressional elections in New Hampshire were held on November 5, 1998, to determine who will represent the state of New Hampshire in the United States House of Representatives. It coincided with the state's gubernatorial elections. Representatives are elected for two-year terms; those elected served in the 106th Congress from January 1999 until January 2001. New Hampshire has two seats in the House, apportioned according to the 1990 United States census.

== Overview ==
United States House of Representatives elections in New Hampshire, 2000
Party	Votes	Percentage	Seats	+/–
Republican	190,170	59.89%	2	-
Democratic	124,000	39.05%	0	-
Libertarian	3,338	1.06%	0	-
Totals	317,508	100.00%	2	-

== District 1 ==
New Hampshire congressional elections, District 1
Party	Candidate	Votes	%	±%
Republican	John E. Sununu (incumbent)	104,430	66.8%	
Democratic	Peter Flood	51,783	33.1%	
Turnout		156,369	100.00%	

== District 2 ==
=== General election ===
==== Polling ====
Poll source	Date(s)	Sample size	Margin of error	Charles Bass (R)	Mary Rauh (D)	Other / undecided (Note: Calculated by taking the difference of 100% and all other candidates combined.)
RKM Research and Communications Inc.	October 26, 1998	183	—	53%	38%	9%

==== Results ====
New Hampshire congressional elections, District 2
Party	Candidate	Votes	%	±%
Republican	Charles Bass (incumbent)	85,740	53.1%	
Democratic	Mary Rauh	72,217	44.7%	
Libertarian	Paula Werme	3,338	2.1%	
Turnout		161,380	100.0%	
