= 2004 United States House of Representatives elections in New Hampshire =

- November 2, 2004

All 2 New Hampshire seats to the United States House of Representatives
	Majority party	Minority party
Party	Republican	Democratic
Last election	2	0
Seats won	2	0
Seat change	Steady	Steady
Popular vote	396,024	243,506
Percentage	60.78%	37.37%
Swing	▲3.32%	▼2.30%
- Republican 50–60% 60–70%

The 2004 congressional elections in New Hampshire were held on November 2, 2004, to determine who will represent the state of New Hampshire in the United States House of Representatives. It coincided with the state's senatorial and gubernatorial elections. Representatives are elected for two-year terms; those elected served in the 109th Congress from January 2005 until January 2007. New Hampshire has two seats in the House, apportioned according to the 2000 United States census.

== Overview ==
United States House of Representatives elections in New Hampshire, 2004
Party	Votes	Percentage	Seats	+/–
Republican	396,024	60.78%	2	-
Democratic	243,506	37.37%	0	-
Libertarian	11,311	1.74%	0	-
Independents	725	0.11%	0	-
Totals	651,566	100.00%	2	-

== District 1 ==
2004 New Hampshire's 1st congressional district election
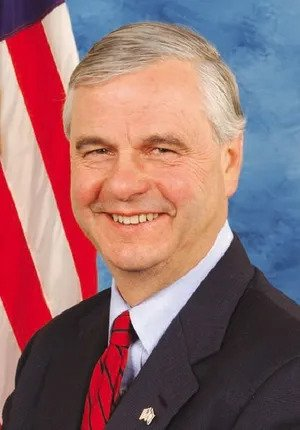

Nominee	Jeb Bradley	Justin Nadeau
Party	Republican	Democratic
Popular vote	204,836	118,226
Percentage	63.4%	36.6%
- County results Bradley: 50–60% 60–70% 70–80%
U.S. Representative before election
Jeb Bradley
Republican
Elected U.S. Representative
Jeb Bradley
Republican

=== Predictions ===
Source	Ranking	As of
The Cook Political Report	Safe R	October 29, 2004
Sabato's Crystal Ball	Safe R	November 1, 2004

Results

New Hampshire's 1st congressional district election, 2004
Party	Candidate	Votes	%
Republican	Jeb Bradley	204,836	63.40%
Democratic	Justin Nadeau	118,226	36.60%
Total votes		323,062	100.00%

== District 2 ==
2004 New Hampshire's 2nd congressional district election
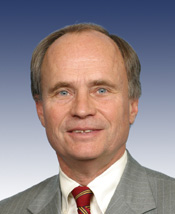

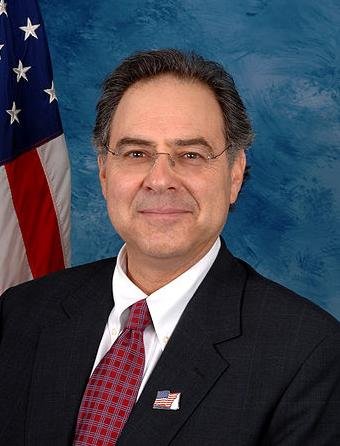
Nominee	Charles F. Bass	Paul W. Hodes
Party	Republican	Democratic
Popular vote	191,188	125,280
Percentage	58.3%	38.2%
- Municipality results Bass: 40–50% 50–60% 60–70% 70–80% 80–90% >90% Hodes: 40–50% 50–60% 60–70% >90% Tie: 50% No votes
U.S. Representative before election
Charles Bass
Republican
Elected U.S. Representative
Charles F. Bass
Republican

=== Predictions ===
Source	Ranking	As of
The Cook Political Report	Likely R	October 29, 2004
Sabato's Crystal Ball	Safe R	November 1, 2004

Results

New Hampshire's 2nd congressional district election, 2004
Party	Candidate	Votes	%
Republican	Charles F. Bass	191,188	58.33%
Democratic	Paul W. Hodes	125,280	38.22%
Libertarian	Richard B. Kahn	11,311	3.45%
Total votes		327,779	100.00%
