= Max Abramson =

American politician (born 1976)

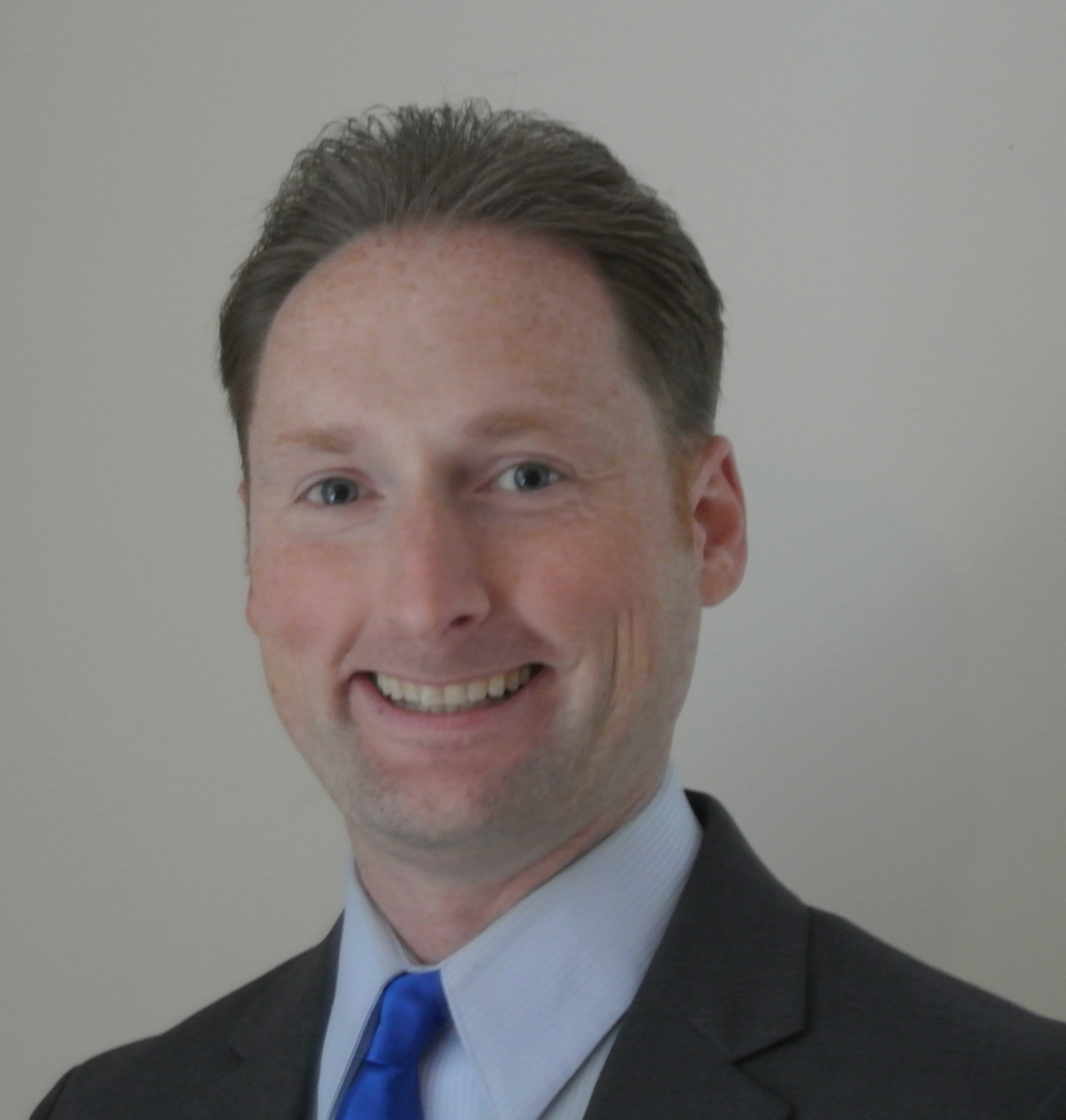
- Abramson in 2016

Member of the New Hampshire House of Representatives
- In office December 2, 2020 – December 7, 2022
- Preceded by: Jason Janvrin
- Succeeded by: Jason Janvrin (representing Rockingham 40th district)
- Constituency: Rockingham 37th
- In office December 5, 2018 – December 2, 2020
- Constituency: Rockingham 20th
- In office December 2014 – December 2016
- Constituency: Rockingham 20th

Personal details
- Born: Albert Abramson; April 29, 1976 (age 50) Kent, Washington, U.S.
- Party: Republican (until 2012, 2014–2016, 2018–2019, 2020, 2020–present)
- Other political affiliations: Libertarian (2012–2014, 2016–2017); Independent (2019–2020) (Note: While Abramson was running for the Libertarian Party presidential nomination, he was not officially registered with the party.); Democratic (2020); Veterans (2020); Reform (2020)
- Education: Great Bay Community College

Albert "Max" Abramson (born April 29, 1976) is an American politician who most recently served as a member of the New Hampshire House of Representatives, representing Rockingham District 37 (Hampton Falls, Seabrook) from 2018 to 2022. He previously represented the same district from 2014 to 2016. He ran for the nomination of the Libertarian Party for the 2020 presidential election, but dropped out on March 3, 2020.

Abramson was the Libertarian nominee for Governor of New Hampshire in 2016. He sought the Veterans Party nomination for President but lost.

== Career ==
In 2010, Abramson was a candidate in the Republican primaries for the New Hampshire House of Representatives, Rockingham District 14, but lost narrowly.

Following his resignation from the Seabrook Planning Board and Budget Committee, Abramson announced a run for the position of Rockingham County attorney as a Libertarian, remarking that the office was "overstaffed" and was not investigating "violence, sexual misconduct, and theft by police officers".

Abramson was elected to the New Hampshire House of Representatives, as a Republican, representing Rockingham, District 20 in late 2014.

When his appeals of the 2010 "reckless conduct" charge failed and the charges were discovered, he was removed from the House Criminal Justice and Public Safety Committee by Republican House Speaker Shawn Jasper.

In May 2016, Abramson announced that he had changed his party registration from Republican to Libertarian. In September, he was nominated as the Libertarian Party of New Hampshire's candidate for Governor of New Hampshire in the 2016 gubernatorial election, garnering 4.3% of the popular vote. Abramson's campaign, buoyed by Gary Johnson's campaign, won major party status and automatic ballot access for the Libertarian Party of New Hampshire for the first time in 20 years.

Following the 2016 election, Abramson switched back to the Republican Party and was re-elected in 2018 to the seat he previously held in the Legislature.

In 2022, Abramson was one of 13 Republicans to vote for a constitutional amendment to secede New Hampshire from the United States.

In 2022, Abramson opposed New Hampshire legislation that would allow homeowners to add up to four housing units on lots that were previously exclusively zoned for single-family housing.

In September 2022, Abramson lost the Republican primary for the Rockingham 40th district to Jason Janvrin, who had preceded him in representing the 37th district; Janvrin would go on to win the general election in November.

=== 2020 presidential campaign ===
Following the 2018 election, Abramson announced his return to the Libertarian Party to campaign for the 2020 Libertarian presidential nomination.

Abramson officially announced his campaign for president under the Libertarian banner on June 30, 2019, two days after again leaving the Republican Party, and becoming an independent. During his campaign, Abramson was the only incumbent elected official running for the Libertarian nomination, however, he never actually joined the Libertarian Party. He stated that his primary campaign platform was to bring troops home and cut the national debt. Moreover, the goal of Abramson's campaign was not "necessarily" to win the presidency, but to elect as many Libertarians to legislative seats as possible. Abramson quit the Libertarian primary on March 3, 2020, subsequently ending his bid for the Libertarian presidential nomination.

On June 8, Abramson asked the Veterans Party of America for their presidential nomination, but they did not hold a national convention for 2020. He also later announced a run for the nomination of the Reform Party. Abramson attempted to organize a merger between the two parties, which Reform Party leadership reacted to negatively. Abramson finished a distant second to Rocky De La Fuente at the Reform Party Convention on June 20. On August 22, Abramson announced on Twitter that The Veterans Party of America decided not to hold a convention or run a candidate for the 2020 presidential election, effectively ending his 2020 presidential run. After briefly joining the Democratic Party, he decided to run as a Republican for the New Hampshire House of Representatives from District 37 of Rockingham County.

== Legal issues ==
On December 19, 2010, Abramson was arrested after firing a gun into his backyard to break up a fight. Abramson raised a claim of self defense and claimed he did this to prevent someone from getting stabbed in a fight happening inside his home. At the time, Abramson was a member of the Seabrook Planning Board and Budget Committee. In March 2012, he was convicted of felony reckless conduct for the incident. He was found guilty of one felony charge of reckless conduct and sentenced to a one-year suspended sentence, 262 hours of community service.

Years later in 2015, as an elected assemblyman the charges surfaced and he was removed from the House Criminal Justice Committee by Speaker Shawn Jasper.

== Electoral history ==
2012 Rockingham County attorney election
Party	Candidate	Votes	%
Republican	James Reams	76,471	52.3%
Democratic	Joseph Plaia	60,210	41.2%
Libertarian	Max Abramson	9,473	6.5%
Total votes		146,208	100%

2014 Rockingham District 20 General Election
Party	Candidate	Votes	%
Republican	Dennis Sweeney	1,977	23.7
Republican	Francis Chase	1,912	23.0
Republican	Max Abramson	1,732	20.8
Democratic	Mark Preston	1,416	17.0
Democratic	David Ahearn	1,283	15.4
Total votes		8,327	100
Republican hold			
Republican hold			
Republican hold			

2016 New Hampshire gubernatorial election
Party	Candidate	Votes	%	±%
Republican	Chris Sununu	354,040	48.8%	+1.4%
Democratic	Colin Van Ostern	337,589	46.6%	−5.8%
Libertarian	Max Abramson	31,243	4.3%	N/A
n/a	Write-ins	1,991	0.3%	+0.1%
Total votes		724,863	100%	N/A

2018 Rockingham District 20 General Election
Party	Candidate	Votes	%
Republican	Aboul Khan (incumbent)	2,233	20.3
Republican	William Fowler	2,053	18.7
Republican	Max Abramson	1,980	18.0
Democratic	Patricia O'Keefe	1,819	16.6
Democratic	Greg Marrow	1,511	16.8
Democratic	Denis Rice	1,385	12.6
Total votes		10,981	100
Republican hold			
Republican hold			
Republican hold			

2024 New Hampshire's 1st congressional district Republican primary results
Party	Candidate	Votes	%
Republican	Russell Prescott	17,408	26.1
Republican	Hollie Noveletsky	15,896	23.8
Republican	Joseph Levasseur	15,418	23.1
Republican	Chris Bright	8,823	13.2
Republican	Walter McFarlane	5,421	8.1
Republican	Max Abramson	2,180	3.3
Republican	Andy Martin	1,563	2.3
Total votes		66,709	100.0
