= 2010 United States Senate election in New Hampshire =

- November 2, 2010
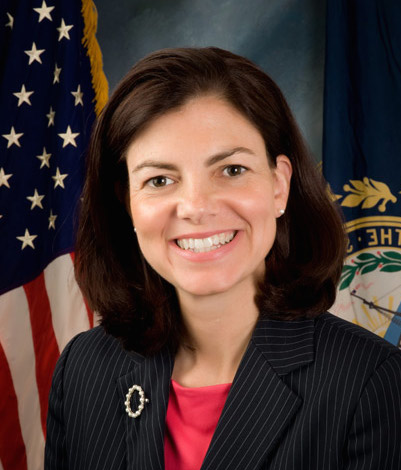

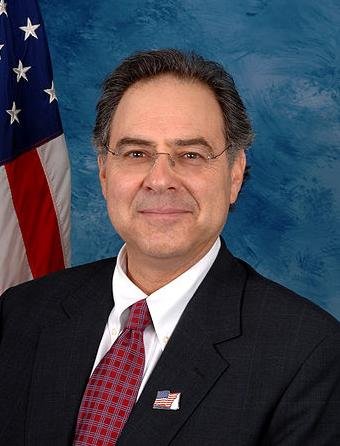
Nominee	Kelly Ayotte	Paul Hodes
Party	Republican	Democratic
Popular vote	273,218	167,545
Percentage	60.09%	36.85%
- Ayotte: 40–50% 50–60% 60–70% 70–80% 80–90% >90% Hodes: 40–50% 50–60% 60–70% 70–80% >90% Tie: 40–50%
U.S. senator before election
Judd Gregg
Republican
Elected U.S. Senator
Kelly Ayotte
Republican

The 2010 United States Senate election in New Hampshire was held on November 2, 2010, alongside other midterm elections to the United States Senate in other states as well as to the United States House of Representatives. This was one of the five Republican-held Senate seats up for election in a state that Barack Obama won in the 2008 presidential election.

Primaries were held on September 14. Incumbent Senator Judd Gregg (R) retired instead of seeking a fourth term, and was succeeded by Kelly Ayotte, who won the open seat by over 23 points. This is the last time that Republicans won a U.S. Senate election in New Hampshire. This was also the first open seat election in the state since 1992. With Democrat Jeanne Shaheen serving in the state's other Senate seat, New Hampshire became the first state in the union to be represented in the Senate simultaneously by two women of opposite parties.

== Background ==
Gregg was reelected with 66% of the vote in 2004, and indicated that he would seek a fourth term in 2010. New Hampshire trended Democratic in the 2006 and 2008 elections, with Republican incumbents losing both of the state's House seats and its other Senate seat to Democrats, but polling conducted in late December 2008 showed Gregg defeating both of the state's U.S. Representatives in a hypothetical match-up.

In February 2009, President Barack Obama offered, and Gregg accepted, nomination to the position of United States Secretary of Commerce. New Hampshire's Democratic Governor John Lynch announced he would appoint Bonnie Newman, former Assistant Secretary of Commerce for economic development in the Reagan administration, to serve as Senator for New Hampshire until the election in 2010. Newman announced that she would not run for election in 2010, nor would she endorse any candidate in the race.

On February 12, 2009, however, Gregg withdrew his nomination for Commerce Secretary. He cited "irresolvable conflicts" over policy related to the Commerce Department as the main reasons for his withdrawal, but also indicated support for President Obama. Gregg continued to serve as a senator from New Hampshire, as he did not resign from the Senate during the nomination process. At the time of the withdrawal, Gregg indicated that he would not run for reelection in 2010. However, at a subsequent press conference, Gregg clarified that he would "probably not" run for reelection, leading to speculation that was not eliminating the possibility completely.

On April 1, 2009, Gregg reaffirmed that he would not run.

Meanwhile, Democratic U.S. Representative Paul Hodes began his Senate campaign. He was the only major announced candidate until Attorney General Kelly Ayotte announced her bid for the Republican nomination in early July 2009. On November 9, 2009, Republican Ovide Lamontagne joined the race as well.

== Republican primary ==
=== Candidates ===
- Kelly Ayotte, former New Hampshire Attorney General
- Tom Alciere, state representative
- Gerard Beloin
- Jim Bender, businessman
- Bill Binnie, businessman
- Dennis Lamare
- Ovide Lamontagne, 1992 congressional candidate and 1996 gubernatorial nominee; chairman of 2004 platform committee

=== Endorsements ===
Kelly Ayotte
- U.S. Senator Judd Gregg
- Former Governor of Alaska and 2008 vice presidential nominee Sarah Palin
- U.S. Senator and Minority Leader Mitch McConnell of Kentucky
- U.S. Senator and 2008 Republican nominee for President John McCain of Arizona
- Former U.S. Congressman Bill Zeliff of New Hampshire
- Former U.S. Senator Warren Rudman
- Former U.S. Marshal for New Hampshire Steve Monier
- State Senator John Barnes, Jr.
- State Senator Robert Letourneau
- State Senator Sheila Roberge
- State Senator Bob Odell
- State Senator John Gallus
- State Senator Sharon Carson
- Former Major League Baseball shortstop and third baseman for the Boston Red Sox Rico Petrocelli
Ovide Lamontagne
- U.S. Senator Jim DeMint of South Carolina
- New Hampshire Union Leader
- Former Vice President Dan Quayle
- Former Republican presidential candidate Steve Forbes
- Former U.S. Senator Gordon Humphrey
- Former State Senator and 2008 gubernatorial nominee Joe Kenney
- Conservative national talk show host Laura Ingraham

=== Polling ===
Poll source	Dates administered	Kelly Ayotte	Jim Bender	Bill Binnie	Ovide Lamontagne	Undecided/other
Tarrance Group	January 13–14, 2010	43%	3%	5%	11%	37%
Research 2000	February 1–3, 2010	36%	––	4%	27%	33%
Public Policy Polling	April 21, 2010	43%	11%	19%	5%	21%
Magellan Strategies	May 28, 2010	38%	4%	29%	9%	15%
Public Policy Polling	July 23–25, 2010	47%	6%	14%	8%	20%
Magellan Strategies	September 1, 2010	34%	13%	17%	21%	15%
Public Policy Polling	September 11–12, 2010	37%	12%	13%	30%	5%
Magellan Strategies	September 12, 2010	35%	10%	14%	31%	10%

=== Results ===
Results by county: Ayotte—40–50% Ayotte—30–40% Lamontagne—30–40% Lamontagne—40–50%

Republican primary results
Party	Candidate	Votes	%
Republican	Kelly Ayotte	53,056	38.21%
Republican	Ovide Lamontagne	51,397	37.01%
Republican	Bill Binnie	19,508	14.05%
Republican	Jim Bender	12,611	9.08%
Republican	Dennis Lamare	1,388	1.00%
Republican	Tom Alciere	499	0.36%
Republican	Gerard Beloin	402	0.29%
Total votes		138,861	100.00%

== General election ==
=== Candidates ===
- Kelly Ayotte (R), former state Attorney General
- Ken Blevens (L), (campaign site, PVS)
- Chris Booth (I), (campaign site, PVS)
- Paul Hodes (D), U.S. Representative since 2007

=== Campaign ===
Hodes called himself a fiscal conservative, which was mocked by Ayotte in a TV ad. Hodes was criticized for supporting President Obama's Economic Recovery package, a carbon energy tax, and Affordable Care Act. Hodes criticized Ayotte for numerous controversies. One ad questioned Ayotte's honesty in dealing with the Lakes Region Ponzi scheme which defrauded investors of almost $80 million.

Ayotte was endorsed by the Concord Monitor and the Nashua Telegraph.

=== Debates ===
- October 11 in Henniker at New England College
- October 28 in Manchester

=== Predictions ===
Source	Ranking	As of
Cook Political Report	Lean R	October 26, 2010
Rothenberg	Safe R	October 22, 2010
RealClearPolitics	Lean R	October 26, 2010
Sabato's Crystal Ball	Likely R	October 21, 2010
CQ Politics	Lean R	October 26, 2010

=== Polling ===
Poll source	Date(s) administered	Sample size	Margin of error	Kelly Ayotte (R)	Paul Hodes (D)	Other	Undecided
Granite State Poll	June 24 – July 1, 2009	558	± 4.1%	39%	35%	2%	24%
Research 2000	July 13 – 15, 2009	600	± 4.0%	39%	38%	2%	21%
Rasmussen Reports	September 14, 2009	500	± 4.5%	46%	38%	5%	12%
American Research Group	September 30, 2009	566	± 4.1%	41%	34%	––	25%
Granite State Poll	October 2, 2009	503	± 4.4%	40%	33%	2%	25%
American Research Group	December 29, 2009	566	± 4.1%	43%	36%	––	21%
Rasmussen Reports	January 12, 2010	500	± 4.5%	49%	40%	3%	8%
Granite State Poll	January 27 – February 3, 2010	500	± 4.4%	41%	33%	1%	25%
Research 2000	February 1–3, 2010	600	± 4.0%	46%	39%	––	11%
Rasmussen Reports	February 10, 2010	500	± 4.5%	46%	39%	3%	13%
Rasmussen Reports	March 8, 2010	500	± 4.5%	47%	37%	4%	12%
Rasmussen Reports	April 7, 2010	500	± 4.5%	50%	35%	4%	11%
Public Policy Polling	April 17–18, 2010	1,474	± 2.6%	47%	40%	––	13%
Granite State Poll	April 12–21, 2010	512	± 4.4%	47%	32%	––	21%
Rasmussen Reports	May 11, 2010	500	± 4.5%	50%	38%	3%	9%
Rasmussen Reports	July 12, 2010	500	± 4.5%	49%	37%	7%	7%
Public Policy Polling	July 23–25, 2010	900	± 3.26%	45%	42%	––	13%
WMUR Granite State Poll	July 19–27, 2010	453	± 4.4%	45%	37%	1%	17%
Rasmussen Reports	August 5, 2010	500	± 4.5%	51%	38%	4%	6%
Public Policy Polling	September 11–12, 2010	1,959	± 2.2%	47%	43%	––	9%
Rasmussen Reports	September 15, 2010	500	± 4.5%	51%	44%	1%	4%
American Research Group	September 22–26, 2010	800	± 3.5%	46%	32%	2%	20%
American Research Group	October 3–5, 2010	600	± 4.0%	47%	42%	4%	7%
Rasmussen Reports	October 10, 2010	750	± 4.0%	51%	44%	3%	2%
WMUR/UNH	October 7–12, 2010	709	± 3.7%	50%	35%	1%	12%
Rasmussen Reports	October 27, 2010	750	± 4.0%	56%	41%	2%	1%
Public Policy Polling	October 27–29, 2010	1,308	± 2.7%	56%	41%	––	3%
WMUR/UNH	October 27–30, 2010	885	± 3.3%	54%	36%	2%	8%
WMUR/UNH	October 31, 2010	885	± 3.3%	55%	32%	2%	2%
The Concord	October 31, 2010	885	± 3.3%	56%	32%	2%	4%

Hypothetical polling

Poll Source	Dates Administered	Sample size	Margin of Error	Paul Hodes (D)	Jim Bender (R)	Other	Undecided
WMUR Granite State Poll	July 19–27, 2010	453	± 4.4%	39%	36%	--	25%
Public Policy Polling	July 23–25, 2010	900	± 3.26%	43%	42%	--	16%
Rasmussen Reports	July 12, 2010	500	± 4.5%	39%	43%	10%	8%
Rasmussen Reports	May 11, 2010	500	± 4.5%	41%	39%	8%	13%
Granite State Poll	April 12–21, 2010	512	± 4.4%	37%	34%	--	29%
Public Policy Polling	April 17–18, 2010	1474	± 2.6%	43%	39%	--	18%
Granite State Poll	January 27 – February 3, 2010	500	± 4.4%	36%	27%	2%	35%

Poll Source	Dates Administered	Sample size	Margin of Error	Paul Hodes (D)	Bill Binnie (R)	Other	Undecided
Rasmussen Reports	August 5, 2010	500	± 4.5%	40%	46%	8%	7%
WMUR Granite State Poll	July 19–27, 2010	453	± 4.4%	38%	41%	--	21%
Public Policy Polling	July 23–25, 2010	900	± 3.26%	41%	46%	--	13%
Rasmussen Reports	July 12, 2010	500	± 4.5%	38%	49%	7%	8%
Rasmussen Reports	May 11, 2010	500	± 4.5%	37%	49%	6%	8%
Granite State Poll	April 12–21, 2010	512	± 4.4%	36%	38%	--	26%
Public Policy Polling	April 17–18, 2010	1474	± 2.6%	42%	45%	--	13%
Rasmussen Reports	April 7, 2010	500	± 4.5%	37%	49%	4%	10%
Rasmussen Reports	March 8, 2010	500	± 4.5%	36%	46%	4%	14%
Rasmussen Reports	February 10, 2010	500	± 4.5%	41%	42%	3%	13%
Research 2000	February 1–3, 2010	600	± 4.0%	45%	35%	--	15%
Granite State Poll	January 27 – February 3, 2010	500	± 4.4%	34%	30%	2%	33%
Rasmussen Reports	January 12, 2010	500	± 4.5%	43%	37%	5%	15%

Poll Source	Dates Administered	Sample size	Margin of Error	Paul Hodes (D)	Ovide Lamontagne (R)	Other	Undecided
WMUR Granite State Poll	July 19–27, 2010	453	± 4.4%	42%	36%	1%	21%
Public Policy Polling	July 23–25, 2010	900	± 3.26%	43%	38%	--	18%
Rasmussen Reports	July 12, 2010	500	± 4.5%	40%	43%	9%	9%
Rasmussen Reports	May 11, 2010	500	± 4.5%	43%	38%	8%	11%
Granite State Poll	April 12–21, 2010	512	± 4.4%	36%	37%	--	26%
Public Policy Polling	April 17–18, 2010	1474	± 2.6%	44%	37%	--	19%
Rasmussen Reports	April 7, 2010	500	± 4.5%	39%	44%	7%	11%
Rasmussen Reports	March 8, 2010	500	± 4.5%	42%	38%	5%	15%
Rasmussen Reports	February 10, 2010	500	± 4.5%	44%	38%	4%	13%
Research 2000	February 1–3, 2010	600	± 4.0%	46%	36%	--	13%
Granite State Poll	January 27 – February 3, 2010	500	± 4.4%	38%	29%	2%	30%
Rasmussen Reports	January 12, 2010	500	± 4.5%	45%	38%	6%	11%
American Research Group	December 29, 2009	566	± 4.1%	31%	37%	--	32%

=== Fundraising ===
Candidate (party)	Receipts	Disbursements	Cash on hand	Debt
Kelly Ayotte (R)	$4,403,599	$3,397,934	$1,005,664	$26,944
Paul Hodes (D)	$4,596,642	$4,346,539	$248,003	$0
Source: Federal Election Commission

=== Results ===

United States Senate election in New Hampshire, 2010
Party	Candidate	Votes	%	±%
Republican	Kelly Ayotte	273,218	60.09%	−6.15%
Democratic	Paul Hodes	167,545	36.85%	+3.10%
Independent	Chris Booth	9,194	2.02%	N/A
Libertarian	Ken Blevens	4,753	1.04%	+1.04%
Total votes		454,710	100.0%	
Republican hold				

==== By county ====
2010 Senate election results in New Hampshire (by county)
County	Kelly Ayote Republican		Paul Hodes Democratic		Other votes	
	#	%	#	%	#	%
Belknap	14,817	65.86%	6,964	30.95%	717	3.19%
Carroll	12,550	62.08%	7,013	34.69%	652	3.23%
Cheshire	13,075	50.6%	12,260	46.94%	783	3.01%
Coös	6,196	58.45%	4,064	38.34%	341	3.21%
Grafton	15,372	49.03%	15,032	47.95%	948	3.03%
Hillsborough	82,511	63.33%	43,924	33.71%	3,861	2..97%
Merrimack	31,456	57.3%	21,655	39.45%	1,784	3.25%
Rockingham	68,017	63.86%	35,002	32.87%	3,483	3.26%
Strafford	21,204	55.49%	15,695	41.07%	1,313	3.44%
Sullivan	8,020	55.46%	5,936	41.05%	504	3.49%
