= 1992 New Hampshire gubernatorial election =

- November 3, 1992
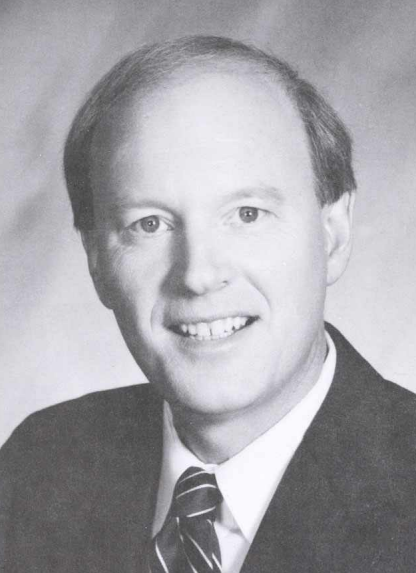

Nominee	Steve Merrill	Deborah Arnesen
Party	Republican	Democratic
Popular vote	289,170	206,232
Percentage	56.02%	39.95%
- Merrill: 40–50% 50–60% 60–70% 70–80% >90% Arnesen: 40–50% 50–60% 60–70% 70–80% >90%
Governor before election
Judd Gregg
Republican
Elected Governor
Steve Merrill
Republican

The 1992 New Hampshire gubernatorial election took place on November 3, 1992. Republican nominee Steve Merrill, the former New Hampshire Attorney General, who defeated Ed Dupont and Liz Hager for the Republican nomination, won the election, defeating Deborah Arnie Arnesen, who had defeated Norman D'Amours for the Democratic nomination.

== Election results ==
New Hampshire gubernatorial election, 1992
Party	Candidate	Votes	%	±%
Republican	Steve Merrill	289,170	56.02%	−4.24%
Democratic	Deborah Arnie Arnesen	206,232	39.95%	+5.40%
Libertarian	Miriam Luce	20,663	4.00%	−0.86%
Write-ins		105	0.02%	
Majority		82,938	16.08%	−9.63%
Turnout		516,170		
Republican hold		Swing		
