= Wayne Douglas King =

American politician

Member of the New Hampshire Senate
- In office 1988–1992

Member of the New Hampshire House of Representatives
- In office 1982–1986

Personal details
- Born: Wayne Douglas King; November 24, 1955 (age 70) Boston, Massachusetts, U.S.
- Party: Democratic Party (United States)
- Education: University of New Hampshire

Wayne Douglas King (born November 24, 1955) is an American politician and author who served three terms in the New Hampshire General Court (House of Representatives) and three terms in the New Hampshire Senate.

He was the State Representative from 1982 to 1986 and a state senator from 1988 to 1992. He was also the democratic party nominee in the 1994 New Hampshire gubernatorial election for Governor.

== Education ==
King graduated from University of New Hampshire and lives in Rumney, New Hampshire.

== Career ==
In 1984 he ran for the New Hampshire General Court and won a seat in New Hampshire District 16 of Grafton County.

In 1988 he won a seat in New Hampshire State Senate.

In 1984 King became involved in a public battle with governor John Sununu over open access to computer records.

King ran unopposed in Democratic primary for governor. King and Fred Bramante were challengers in the New Hampshire governor's race against Steve Merrill.

King was expected to play a major role in organizing Mario Cuomo's campaign. Governor of Arkansas, Bill Clinton, and a state campaign chairman for Senator Bob Kerrey of Nebraska reached out to King even before Cuomo made his announcement.

== Post politics years ==
King is a writer and columnist. He was honored for his political column The View from Rattlesnake Ridge by the New England Newspaper and Press Association (now PA Media Group) at its annual dinner in Boston. He hosts podcasts, Radical Centrist and NH Secrets, Legends, and Lore.
