= 1990 New Hampshire gubernatorial election =

- November 6, 1990

Nominee	Judd Gregg	J. Joseph Grandmaison
Party	Republican	Democratic
Popular vote	177,773	101,923
Percentage	60.26%	34.55%
- Gregg: 40–50% 50–60% 60–70% 70–80% 80–90% >90% Grandmaison: 40–50% 50–60% 60–70% >90% Tie: 50%
Governor before election
Judd Gregg
Republican
Elected Governor
Judd Gregg
Republican

The 1990 New Hampshire gubernatorial election took place on November 6, 1990. Incumbent Governor Judd Gregg won reelection to a second term that would be his last, as he ran for and won election to the United States Senate in 1992.

== Election results ==
New Hampshire gubernatorial election, 1990
Party	Candidate	Votes	%	±%
Republican	Judd Gregg (inc.)	177,773	60.26%	−0.17%
Democratic	J. Joseph Grandmaison	101,923	34.55%	−4.49%
Libertarian	Miriam Luce	14,348	4.86%	+4.36%
Write-ins		974	0.33%	
Majority		75,850	25.71%	−4.32%
Turnout		295,018		
Republican hold		Swing		
