= 1994 New Hampshire gubernatorial election =

- November 8, 1994
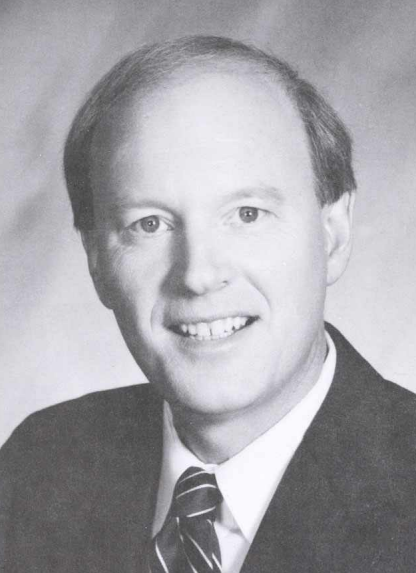

Nominee	Steve Merrill	Wayne Douglas King
Party	Republican	Democratic
Popular vote	218,134	79,686
Percentage	69.94%	25.55%
- Merrill: 40–50% 50–60% 60–70% 70–80% 80–90% >90% King: 40–50% 70–80%
Governor before election
Steve Merrill
Republican
Elected Governor
Steve Merrill
Republican

The 1994 New Hampshire gubernatorial election took place on November 8, 1994. Incumbent Governor Steve Merrill won re-election to a second term in a landslide amidst the concurrent Republican Revolution.

Despite his high popularity as governor, Merrill chose not to seek a third term in 1996, citing wanting to spend more time with his wife and kids. Following this election, Democrats would control the governorship for 18 of the next 20 years.

== Election results ==
New Hampshire gubernatorial election, 1994
Party	Candidate	Votes	%	±%
Republican	Steve Merrill (inc.)	218,134	69.94%	+13.92%
Democratic	Wayne King	79,686	25.55%	−14.40%
Libertarian	Steve Winter	13,709	4.40%	+0.40%
Write-ins		353	0.11%	
Majority		138,448	44.39%	+28.31%
Turnout		311,882		
Republican hold		Swing		
