= Ovide Lamontagne =

American businessman and former political candidate

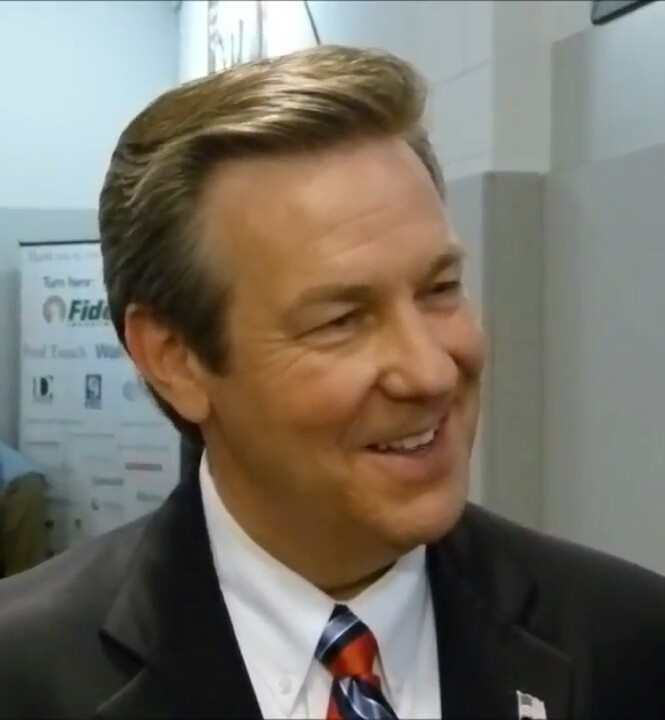
- Born: Ovide Marc Lamontagne; September 24, 1957 (age 68); Manchester, New Hampshire, U.S.
- Education: Catholic University (BA); University of Wyoming (JD)
- Political party: Republican
- Spouse: Bettie Lamontagne (m. 1979)

Ovide Marc Lamontagne (born 1957) is an American businessman who serves as a shareholder at Bernstein Shur law firm in Manchester, New Hampshire. Lamontagne is a lawyer and a Republican former political candidate who was his party's nominee for Governor of New Hampshire in 1996 and 2012. He also unsuccessfully sought the Republican nomination for the US Senate in 2010.

Lamontagne, who is of French-Canadian descent, was born and raised in Manchester. He graduated from Manchester's Trinity High School in 1975 before he took his undergraduate degree at the Catholic University of America in 1979. He taught social studies at a high school level before attending the Wyoming College of Law, graduating with his Juris Doctor degree in 1985. He clerked for Judge James E. Barrett of the United States Court of Appeals for the Tenth Circuit before returning to Manchester in 1986. That year, he joined the Manchester law firm Devine Millimet.

== Personal life ==
A fourth-generation New Hampshire native, Ovide was born on September 24, 1957, in Manchester, where he attended Trinity High School. He graduated from Trinity in 1975 as the Student Council President and the State President of the New Hampshire Association of Student Councils.

Ovide met his wife Bettie while they were both attending the Catholic University of America in Washington, DC. They were married in June 1979, following their graduation from the university the previous month.

After spending some time working as a high school teacher at St. Vincent Pallotti High School in Laurel, Maryland, outside of Washington, DC, Ovide received an offer to move to Wyoming to be a high school teacher in Cheyenne. Ovide and Bettie relocated to Wyoming, where Ovide enrolled in the University of Wyoming College of Law. He graduated with honors in 1985, receiving his Juris Doctor degree.

Ovide and Bettie have two older daughters and a foster son. Before adopting their son, Ovide and Bettie had hosted a number of foster children for short-term stays, and they were contacted about a child living in the hospital who needed a home. Upon learning that the child was disabled, Ovide became involved with Easter Seals to help teach their child necessary skills. Ovide and Bettie have been caring for their foster son for the last 24 years.

== Law career ==
Upon his return to New Hampshire in 1986, he joined the Manchester-based law-firm Devine, Millimet & Branch. By 1992, he had risen to become a partner in the firm. Ovide's practice areas include healthcare, not-for-profit charitable trust litigation and construction law. He also serves as general counsel for a number of not-for-profit organizations and has significant experience representing religious organizations.

Ovide was ranked in 2010 and 2011 by Chambers USA as one of America's leading commercial attorneys and has been chosen six years running for inclusion in The Best Lawyers in America in the field of commercial and construction litigation. Ovide was admitted to the New Hampshire Bar in 1985 and is a member of both the New Hampshire and Manchester Bar Associations. In the 1991 session of the New Hampshire General Court, he served as counsel for the State Senate.

In 2015 Ovide joined Bernstein Shur, a New England–based law firm with clients across the US and around the world. Ovide's practice primarily focuses on complex business transactions to include commercial litigation as well as providing corporate counsel to a diverse array of commercial, charitable non-profit and institutional clients. Located at that Manchester office, Ovide has been known to bring strategic, creative and practical solutions to complicated matters. His prior experience in complex business and litigation transactions, coupled with his passion for his home state of New Hampshire, combine to make Ovide a powerhouse in the legal community.

Since returning to New Hampshire, Ovide has resumed his engagement in the civic, charitable and political community. He co-chaired Carly Fiorina's NH 2016 presidential campaign, served as a senior advisor to Senator Kelly Ayotte's 2016 re-election campaign, co-chairs the Bishop's Summer Reception to benefit the Bishop's Charitable Assistance Fund and also chaired Northeast Catholic College's Fidelity and Courage Dinner. Additionally, Ovide chairs Granite Action, a 501(c)(4) conservative issues advocacy group, and serves on the Executive Board of the Daniel Webster Council-BSA.

=== Child abuse settlement ===
As an attorney for the Roman Catholic Diocese of Manchester, Lamontagne negotiated the 2003 settlement of the New Hampshire Attorney General's investigation into the child sex abuse scandal that spared the diocese from being criminally charged. In all, in the period of 2002–03, the diocese agreed to a $15.5 million settlement involving 176 claims of sex abuse.

The May 2003 settlement of 61 abuse claims for $6.5 million handled by Lamontagne as counsel for the Manchester Diocese prevented the diocese from being criminally prosecuted. In December 2002, the diocese had admitted that its failure to protect children from sexual abuse may have been a violation of criminal law, becoming the first diocese in the United States to do so. Under threat of indictment by the New Hampshire Attorney General, Bishop John McCormack signed an agreement acknowledging that the Attorney General office possessed evidence sufficient to win convictions as part of the settlement.

Lamontagne claimed that McCormack and other prominent church members wanted a speedy settlement and, in an example of behaving "pastorally" rather than as a litigant, instructed their attorneys to take a moderate stance and eschew hardline legal tactics. Lamontagne said of the diocese's legal strategy, "That is not typical in terms of client requests."

== Political career ==
In 1993, Lamontagne was appointed the chair of the New Hampshire State Board of Education by Governor Steve Merrill, serving in that post until 1996, when he resigned to run for governor.

=== 1996 gubernatorial campaign ===
In 1996, when Merrill declined to run for reelection, Lamontagne won the Republican nomination for governor. He faced off against New Hampshire state senator Jeanne Shaheen, a political moderate, who had won the Democratic nod. Running as a social conservative, Lamontagne was decisively defeated by Shaheen, losing by 87,854 votes (57% to 40%) .

=== 2010 senatorial campaign ===
When incumbent Republican US Senator Judd Gregg decided to retire instead of seeking re-election, Lamontagne ran for the Republican nomination to the US Senate. His main opponent in the primary was New Hampshire Attorney General Kelly Ayotte, who had resigned on July 7, 2009, to launch her campaign. Ayotte had been recruited by the Republican Party's National Republican Senatorial Committee to enter the race, and she was supported by such GOP heavyweights as 2008 Republican presidential nominee John McCain, who campaigned for her in New Hampshire.

In addition to Ayotte, who was considered the front-runner, the other candidates for the Republican nomination were millionaire businessman Bill Binnie and Jim Bender. Drawing on support from the Tea Party movement, Lamontagne made a very strong showing against Ayotte, despite being outspent by Ayotte by a factor of five ($2 million to $400,000). The race was considered too close to call by the major media until the morning of the day after Election Day. When Ayotte eventually pulled ahead by approximately 1,600 votes in a contest Norma Love of Huffington Post called a "nail biter", Lamontagne conceded the election.

After being defeated by Ayotte, Lamontagne raised money for her campaign.

=== 2012 gubernatorial campaign ===
On September 19, 2011, Lamontagne announced his candidacy for the 2012 Republican gubernatorial nomination at the Bedford Republican Breakfast at the Manchester Country Club, becoming the first candidate to throw a hat into the ring. On March 13, 2012, Lamontagne was endorsed by U.S. Representative Charles Bass of the state's 2nd congressional district. Lamontagne in turn endorsed Bass for reelection. Lamontagne's gubernatorial bid was endorsed by Judd Gregg on May 3, 2012. While Lamontagne won the Republican nomination for governor on September 11, 2012, he lost the general election to Democrat Maggie Hassan by a vote of 378,934 (55%) to 294,024 (43%)

Party political offices
Preceded by Steve Merrill	Republican nominee for Governor of New Hampshire; 1996	Succeeded by Jay Lucas
Preceded by John Stephen	Republican nominee for Governor of New Hampshire; 2012	Succeeded by Walt Havenstein
