= Deborah Arnesen =

American talk show host and former politician

Arnie Arnesen

Member of the New Hampshire House of Representatives from the 7th Grafton district
- In office 1984–1992
- Preceded by: Stephen Harnish
- Succeeded by: William Driscoll; David Dow

Personal details
- Born: Deborah Arnie Arnesen; October 1, 1953 (age 72) New York City, New York, U.S.
- Party: Democratic
- Spouse: Martin Capodice (m. 2002; died 2013)
- Children: 2
- Education: St. Olaf College (BA); Vermont Law School (JD)
- Website: Official website

Deborah "Arnie" Arnesen (born October 1, 1953), is an American radio show host and former politician, serving for eight years as a member of the New Hampshire House of Representatives.

== Early life ==
Arnesen was born in Brooklyn, New York to a Norwegian father and an Italian mother.

== Political career ==
Arnesen is a former fellow of the Harvard Institute of Politics, and a former member of the New Hampshire House of Representatives from Orford, New Hampshire, serving from 1984 to 1992. She was the Democratic nominee in the 1992 New Hampshire gubernatorial election, when she he became the first woman in New Hampshire history to be nominated by a major political party in a race for governor. She also ran for U.S. Congress in 1996. Arnesen was elected to the Common Cause National Governing Board in 1993 and again in 1997.

Arnesen has supported a broad-based tax plan in New Hampshire, rejecting The Pledge and supporting the establishment of a state-level income tax.

== Media career ==
Arnesen is the host of The Attitude on WNHN 94.7FM in New Hampshire. She has also made several appearances on C-SPAN.

== Personal life ==
Arnesen has two daughters, Melissa Arnesen-Trunzo (born 1982) and Kirsten Arnesen-Trunzo (born 1984) from her marriage to Thomas Trunzo. They divorced in 2000. She met Martin J. Capodice in 2000 and married him in 2002. He died in 2013.

Currently she runs a B&B (booked through AirBNB) across the street from the Christa McCauliffe school. One of the rooms has a plaque in it where a former Democratic president slept.

Party political offices
Preceded by Joseph Grandmaison	Democratic nominee for Governor of New Hampshire; 1992	Succeeded by Wayne King
