= Ed Dupont =

American politician

Ed Dupont is a New Hampshire businessman, five-term New Hampshire state senator, former New Hampshire State Senate President, and President of the Dupont Group, one of New Hampshire's most powerful lobbying firms. He served on the University of New Hampshire Board of Trustees for a decade, the last four years as Chair, and served on the New Hampshire Commission on State Government Innovation, Efficiency, and Transparency.

As a young man, he dropped out of the University of New Hampshire after his third year and began to run a gas station, buying his first fuel delivery truck just before the 1973 oil crisis, and founding Strafford Fuels. He ran for the legislature for the first time in 1983 and went into lobbying after he lost the Republican primary for Governor in 1992 to Steve Merrill.

New Hampshire Senate
Preceded by Louis E. Bergeron	Member of the New Hampshire Senate from the 6th district 1984–1992	Succeeded by George A. Lovejoy
Political offices
Preceded by William S. Bartlett Jr.	President of the New Hampshire Senate; 1990–1992	Succeeded by Ralph D. Hough
