= Steve Winter (New Hampshire politician) =

American politician

Member of the New Hampshire House of Representatives from the Merrimack 2nd district
- In office 2000–2002

Member of the New Hampshire House of Representatives from the Merrimack 3rd district
- In office 2010–2012

Personal details
- Born: Steven Jay Winter; October 2, 1938 Evanston, Illinois, U.S.
- Died: July 15, 2023 (aged 84) Newbury, New Hampshire, U.S.
- Party: Democratic; Republican; Liberatarian
- Education: California State University, Los Angeles

Steven Jay Winter (October 2, 1938 – July 15, 2023) was an American politician. A member of the Democratic Party, the Republican Party, and the Liberatarian Party, he served in the New Hampshire House of Representatives from 2000 to 2002 and again from 2010 to 2012.

== Life and career ==
Winter was born in Evanston, Illinois, the son of Oswald Winter and Anne Stordeur. He attended San Bernardino High School, graduating in 1956. After graduating, he attended California State University, Los Angeles, earning his B.A. degree in 1962.

In 1994, Winter ran as a Liberatarian candidate for governor of New Hampshire. He received 13,709 votes, but lost to Republican incumbent Steve Merrill, who won with 218,134 votes.

Winter served in the New Hampshire House of Representatives from 2000 to 2002 and again from 2010 to 2012.

== Death ==
Winter died on July 15, 2023 in Newbury, New Hampshire, at the age of 84.
