= Governor Hough =

Governor Hough may refer to:

- Ralph D. Hough (born 1943), Acting Governor of New Hampshire in 1993
- Henry Hughes Hough (1871–1943), Governor of the United States Virgin Islands from 1922 to 1923
