= Jim Rubens =

American politician from New Hampshire

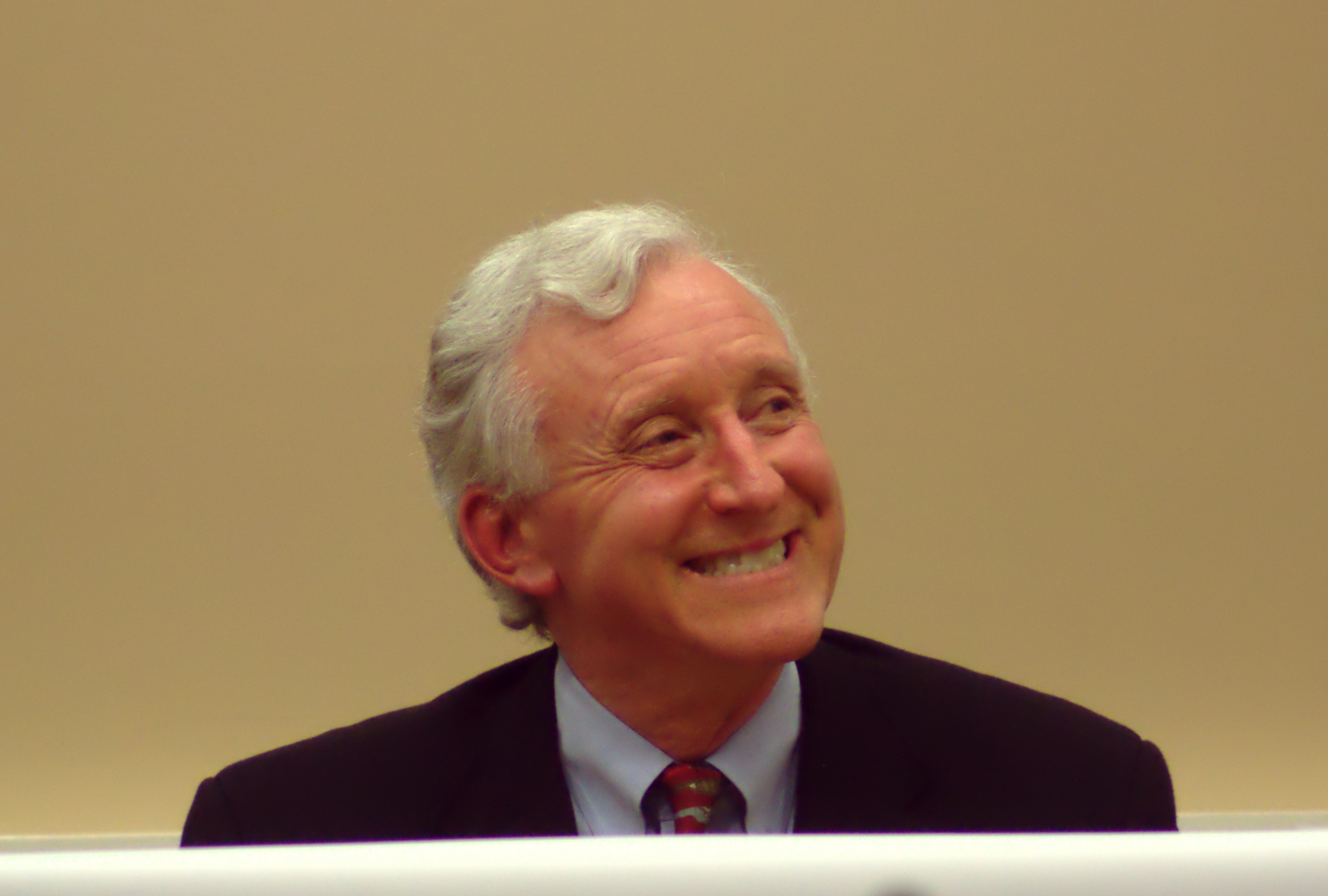

Member of the New Hampshire Senate from the 5th district
- In office December 7, 1994 – December 2, 1998
- Preceded by: Ralph D. Hough
- Succeeded by: Clifton Below

Personal details
- Born: New York City, New York, U.S.
- Party: Republican
- Education: Dartmouth College
- Website: Official website

Jim Rubens is an American politician from the state of New Hampshire. A member of the Republican Party, Rubens served in the New Hampshire Senate for two terms.

== Biography ==
Rubens was born in Brooklyn. He attended Dartmouth College. He worked as a developer and investor.

Identifying himself as a fiscal conservative, Rubens formed a new political party in 1993, called the New Majority, an offshoot of the Independence Party of New York. Rubens ran for the New Hampshire Senate in 1994, challenging Ralph Hough in the Republican Party primary election. Rubens defeated Hough, and won in the general election. In 1995 he was sworn in. Rubens was reelected in 1996. Rather than run for reelection to the New Hampshire Senate in 1998, he ran for Governor of New Hampshire in the 1998 election, but lost. Rubens ran again for the state Senate in 2000, but lost.

Rubens recently served as the chairman of the Granite State Coalition Against Expanded Gambling. He stepped down from this position when he became a candidate for the United States Senate, seeking the Republican nomination in the 2014 election. He had the support of the Mayday PAC for the race. Rubens lost the primary election to Scott Brown.

Rubens lost to incumbent Senator Kelly Ayotte in the 2016 election.

Rubens in 2010 published a non-fiction book, OverSuccess, Healing the American Obsession with Wealth, Fame, Power and Perfection . One of the book's theses is that success benchmarks and competition for social status have sharply escalated over past decades, shrinking space for personal recognition for many Americans, leading to documented increases in several forms of individual, societal and cultural pathology.

Rubens serves on the board of American Promise which seeks ratification by 2026 of a constitutional amendment restoring power to Congress and the States to set reasonable limits on campaign spending and contributions. Rubens serves as New England chair for Take Back Our Republic , the nation's leading conservative anti-corruption organization.

== Personal ==
Rubens is from Hanover, New Hampshire. He has a wife and a son.
