= Judd Gregg Meteorology Institute =

Research center at Plymouth State University in New Hampshire, United States

Coordinates: 43.7568°N 71.6902°W

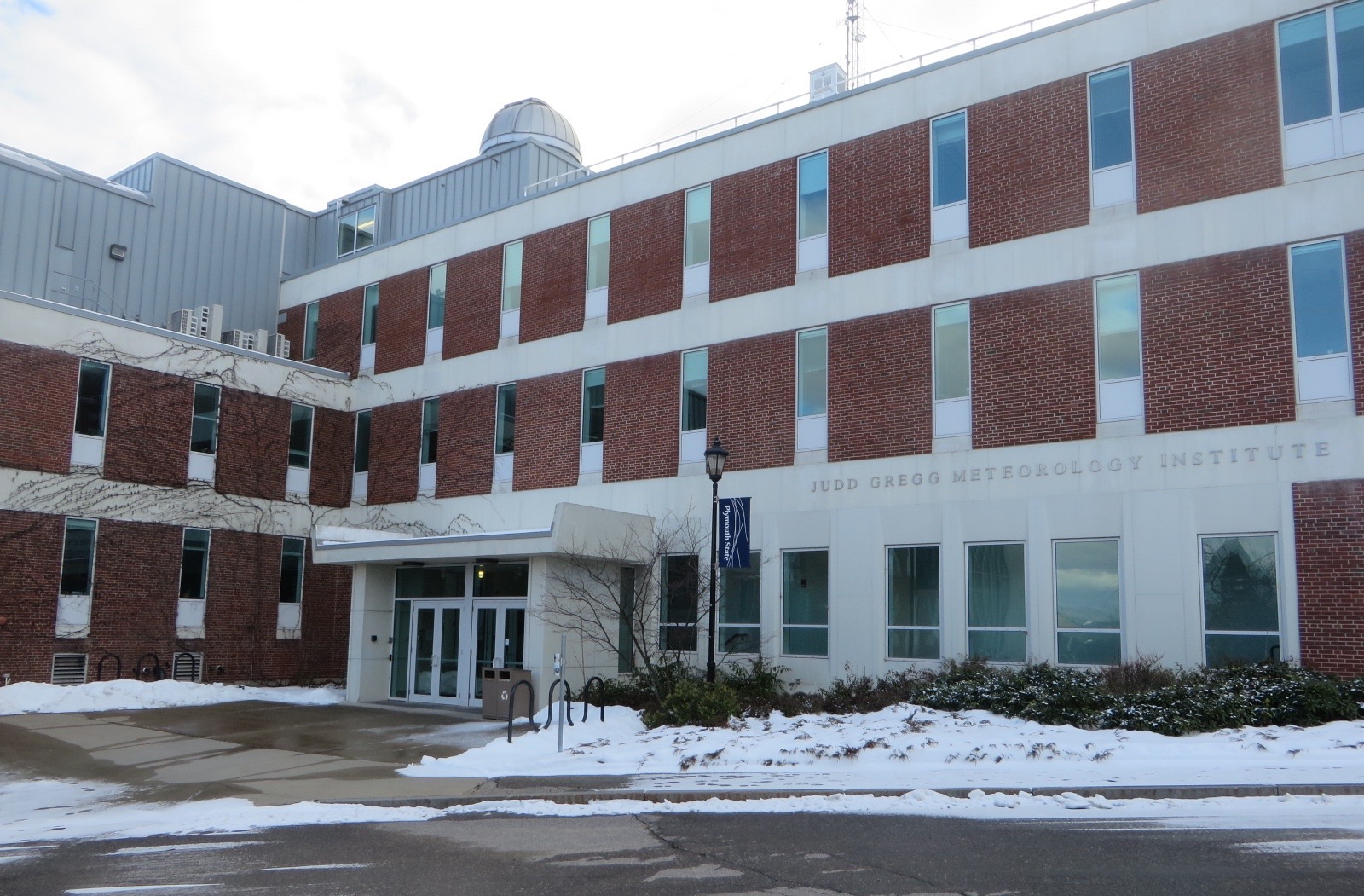
Judd Gregg Meteorology Institute on the campus of Plymouth State University, Plymouth, New Hampshire

Judd Gregg Meteorology Institute (JGMI), established in 2003, is the center of meteorological and atmospheric research at Plymouth State University, which offers the only meteorology degree program in the state of New Hampshire. The institute, named for Senator Judd Gregg, provides equipment and technology to PSU students, faculty, and staff, while providing outreach throughout New Hampshire and the rest of the United States.

== Resources and outreach opportunities ==
The institute houses the Plymouth State Weather Center, a facility which provides weather information, including observations, tutorials, satellite and radar data and more. The Weather Center's web site is accessed more than 500,000 times a week.

Research facilities for undergraduate and graduate meteorology students include a rooftop weather observation center, an electronic map wall, a weather technology lab, a GPS-radiosonde system, a portable micrometeorological measurement platform and a fully instrumental Automated Weather Observation System (AWOS). An online archive of meteorological data is used to analyze air chemistry and pollution events.

The institute conducts projects and partnerships with the National Weather Center, the University of New Hampshire, the National Oceanic and Atmospheric Administration, the U.S. Air Force, the National Center for Atmospheric Research, the Federal Aviation Administration, the Mount Washington Observatory, the U.S. Army Cold Regions Research and Engineering Laboratory and many other agencies. The institute has a 10-year agreement with the New Hampshire Department of Transportation to deploy over 50 weather observation stations throughout the state to measure road surface and subsurface temperature and ozone concentrations.

In outreach to the community, the institute conducts workshops for teachers of grades K-12 and leads field trips for students.
