= 1998 United States Senate election in New Hampshire =

- November 3, 1998
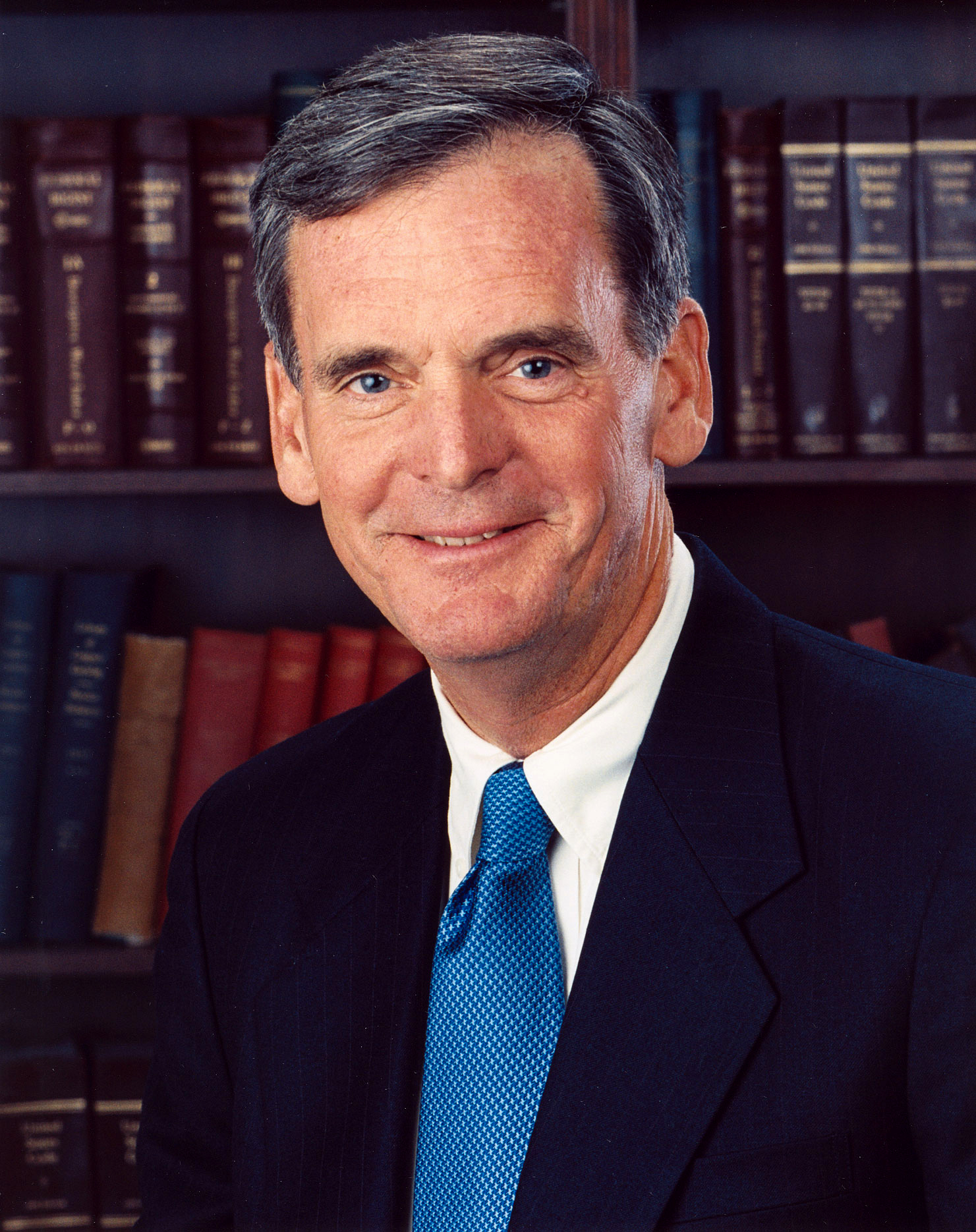

Nominee	Judd Gregg	George; Condodemetraky
Party	Republican	Democratic
Popular vote	213,477	88,883
Percentage	67.84%	28.24%
- Gregg: 40–50% 50–60% 60–70% 70–80% 80–90% >90% Condodemetraky: 50–60%
U.S. senator before election
Judd Gregg
Republican
Elected U.S. Senator
Judd Gregg
Republican

The 1998 United States Senate election in New Hampshire took place on November 3, 1998. Incumbent Republican Senator Judd Gregg ran for re-election. He won the Republican primary in a landslide over challenger Phil Weber, a State Representative, and faced the Democratic nominee, Belmont Selectman George Condodemetraky, in the general election. Gregg ultimately defeated Condodemetraky by a wide margin, winning his second term with 68% of the vote and winning every county, despite incumbent Democratic Governor Jeanne Shaheen concurrently winning re-election with more than 66% of the vote and every county as well.

== Democratic primary ==
=== Candidates ===
- George Condodemetraky, Belmont Selectman

=== Results ===
Democratic primary results
Party	Candidate	Votes	%
Democratic	George Condodemetraky	22,988	98.18%
Democratic	Write-ins	426	1.82%
Total votes		23,414	100.00%

== Republican primary ==
=== Candidates ===
- Judd Gregg, incumbent U.S. Senator
- Phil Weber, State Representative

=== Results ===
Republican primary results
Party	Candidate	Votes	%
Republican	Judd Gregg (inc.)	63,729	85.48%
Republican	Phil Weber	10,784	38.21%
Republican	Write-ins	42	0.06%
Total votes		74,555	100.00%

== General election ==
=== Polling ===
Poll source	Date(s) administered	Sample size (Note: Key: A – all adults RV – registered voters LV – likely voters V – unclear)	Margin of error	Judd Gregg (R)	George Condodemetraky (D)	Undecided
Mason-Dixon	September 28–29, 1998	627 (LV)	± 4.0%	63%	23%	14%
American Research Group	September 9–10, 1998	634 (LV)	± 4.0%	61%	24%	15%
RKM Research & Communications (Note: Poll sponsored by WMUR-TV)	September 9–10, 1998	494 (RV)	± 4.4%	63%	18%	19%
RKM Research & Communications	June 26–28, 1998	489 (RV)	± 4.4%	67%	13%	20%

=== Results ===
1998 United States Senate election in New Hampshire
Party	Candidate	Votes	%	±%
Republican	Judd Gregg (inc.)	213,477	67.84%	+19.67%
Democratic	George Condodemetraky	88,883	28.24%	−17.10%
Libertarian	Brian Christeson	7,603	2.42%	−1.10%
Constitution	Roy Kendel	4,733	1.50%	—
Majority		124,594	39.59%	+36.77%
Total votes		314,696	100.00%	
Republican hold				

== See also ==
- 1998 United States Senate elections

== Notes ==
Partisan clients
