= Bonnie Newman =

American businesswoman (born 1945)

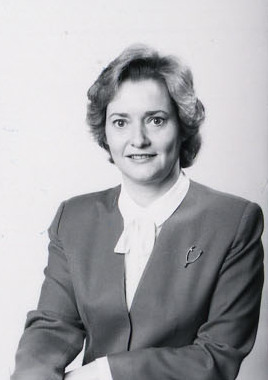

Personal details
- Born: June 2, 1945 (age 80) Lawrence, Massachusetts, U.S.
- Party: Republican
- Education: St. Joseph's College, Maine (BA); Pennsylvania State University (MEd)

Jane Ellen "Bonnie" Newman (born June 2, 1945) from North Hampton, New Hampshire is an American administrator and business executive. A Republican, she worked for Judd Gregg, Ronald Reagan, and George H. W. Bush. Newman was also interim president of the University of New Hampshire (UNH) and the Community College System of New Hampshire. She was announced by the governor of New Hampshire as his selection for eventual appointment to the United States Senate when Gregg was nominated to become the United States Secretary of Commerce, but did not take office when the vacancy she was to fill did not materialize.

== Education and early life ==
Newman was born in Lawrence, Massachusetts, the daughter of Louise (née Casey) and William Newman, who worked at New England Telephone.

Newman has a Bachelor of Arts in sociology from St. Joseph's College of Maine and Master of Education in higher education administration from Pennsylvania State University. She has honorary degrees from UNH, Rivier College, Notre Dame College, Keene State College, St. Joseph's College, and New Hampshire College (now Southern New Hampshire University).

== Career ==
Newman was the assistant dean of students at UNH from 1969 to 1972 and dean of students from 1972 to 1978.

In 1981, she moved to Washington D.C. to serve as chief of staff to Judd Gregg when he was in the United States House of Representatives. From 1982 to 1984 she was the associate director of presidential personnel at the White House. She then served as Assistant Secretary of Commerce for economic development and head of the Economic Development Administration from 1984 to 1985. She served as president of the Business and Industry Association of New Hampshire in Concord from 1985 to 1988. On February 11, 1988 she was named president of the New England Council. She left in 1989 to lead administrative operations for the George H. W. Bush administration. From 1991 to 1995 she was president of Coastal Broadcasting Corp., owner of WZEA-FM radio in Hampton, New Hampshire.

Newman served as interim Dean of the Whittemore School of Business and Economics at the University of New Hampshire from 1998 to 1999. She served as the executive dean at Harvard Kennedy School at Harvard University from 2000 to 2005. Newman then served as interim president of UNH from 2006 through 2007. She was a Senior Fellow at the Harvard University John F. Kennedy School of Government.

Newman is a former chairwoman of the United States Naval Academy Board of Visitors and has served on the board of FairPoint Communications since 2007. She was the interim chancellor of the Community College System of New Hampshire, serving from August 2011 until February 2012.

== Proposed appointment to United States Senate ==
On February 3, 2009, President Barack Obama announced that he would nominate Gregg, then a Republican Senator representing New Hampshire, as the Secretary of Commerce. Later in the day, Lynch announced that he would appoint Newman to the Senate to fill Gregg's seat if and when there was a vacancy. Newman announced that, if appointed to the Senate, she would not run for reelection in 2010, nor would she endorse any candidate in that race.

In face of Senate Republican Leaders asking Gregg to reconsider, Gregg reached a deal with Governor John Lynch that he would appoint a placeholder in order to avoid changing the partisan makeup of the United States Senate. However, on February 12, 2009, citing "irresolvable conflicts" with the Obama administration on issues surrounding the United States census and American Recovery and Reinvestment Act of 2009, Gregg announced he was withdrawing his nomination for the position of Commerce Secretary and remaining in the Senate.

== Political activities ==
Newman considered running for the Senate in 1990 for the seat held by the retiring Gordon J. Humphrey.

Newman was one of the first Republicans to publicly endorse John Lynch, a Democrat, in his successful 2004 challenge of then-Republican Governor Craig Benson. In the campaign, she co-chaired Republicans for Lynch.

Newman joined Standing Up for New Hampshire Families, a bipartisan organization opposing the effort of the New Hampshire Legislature to repeal legislation allowing same-sex marriage in New Hampshire.
