= Coalition for Open Democracy =

U.S. nonprofit organization

- Formation: 2009; 17 years ago
- Founder: Doris "Granny D" Haddock
- Type: 501(c)(3)
- Tax ID no.: 80-0336490
- Purpose: Campaign finance reform
- Headquarters: Concord, New Hampshire
- Executive Director: Olivia Zink
- Website: www.opendemocracynh.org

Coalition for Open Democracy is a New Hampshire-based nonprofit devoted to campaign finance reform. It was formed in 2009 by Doris "Granny D" Haddock.

Each year it sponsors "Rebellion" walks to commemorate Granny D, who at the age of 88-90 walked across the United States, ending in Washington, DC, where she was arrested for reading the Declaration of Independence in the Capitol.

In 2017, it is providing back-office support for EqualVotesUS, an organization that intends to fight the electoral college presidential voting method in the courts. The specific goal is to eliminate the "winner take all" system for electoral college votes within a state.
