= Doris Haddock =

American political activist

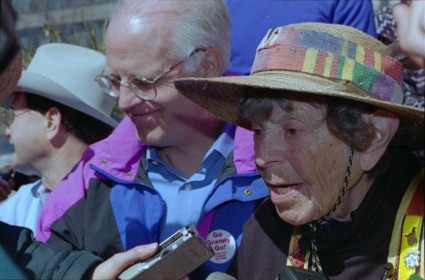
- Haddock in February 2000

Personal details
- Born: Ethel Doris Rollins; January 24, 1910 Laconia, New Hampshire, U.S.
- Died: March 9, 2010 (aged 100) Dublin, New Hampshire, U.S.
- Party: Democratic
- Education: Emerson College (BA)

Doris "Granny D" Haddock (born Ethel Doris Rollins; January 24, 1910 – March 9, 2010) was an American political activist from New Hampshire. Haddock achieved national fame when, between the ages of 88 and 90, starting on January 1, 1999, and culminating on February 29, 2000, she walked over 3,200 miles (5,100 km) across the continental United States to advocate for campaign finance reform. In 2004, she ran unsuccessfully as a Democratic challenger to incumbent Republican Judd Gregg in the U.S. Senate election in New Hampshire. At age 94 at the time, Haddock was the oldest congressional candidate in U.S. history.

Haddock's walk across the country followed a southern route and took more than a year to complete, starting on January 1, 1999, in southern California and ending in Washington, D.C., on February 29, 2000.

Haddock requested a name change of her middle name to "Granny D", the name by which she had long been known. On August 19, 2004, Haddock's request was officially granted by Judge John Maher during a hearing at the Cheshire County probate court.

== Personal life ==
Ethel Doris Rollins was born in Laconia, New Hampshire, the daughter of Ethel and Carl Rollins. She attended Emerson College in Boston, Massachusetts, for three years before marrying James Haddock. Emerson students were not allowed to marry at that time, so she was expelled. She was, however, later awarded an honorary degree in 2000.

After marrying, she started a family; she had a daughter, Betty and a son, James Jr.. She worked during the Great Depression and was employed for twenty years as an executive secretary in the offices of the BeeBee Shoe factory in Manchester, New Hampshire. Haddock and her husband retired to Dublin, New Hampshire, in 1972. Her husband later developed Alzheimer's disease, dying after a ten-year struggle with the illness. At about the same time, Haddock's best friend died. During her 1999 walk across the nation, the hat that Haddock was seen in was one that belonged originally to her best friend. Haddock had eight grandchildren: Heidi, Gillian, David Bradley, William, Alice, Joseph, Lawrence, and Raphael. She also had 16 great-grandchildren: Kyle, David, Jennie, Kendall, Peyton, Matthew, Richard, Grace, Justin, William, James, Beatrix, Tucker, Mathilda, Parker, and Clay.

Haddock celebrated her 100th birthday on January 24, 2010, and died six weeks later on March 9, 2010, at her son's home in Dublin, New Hampshire, following a bout with respiratory illness.

She was a life-long member of the United Methodist Church.

== Activist career ==
In 1960, Haddock began her political activism when she and her husband successfully campaigned against planned hydrogen bomb nuclear testing in Alaska that threatened an Inuit fishing village at Point Hope. The couple retired to Dublin, New Hampshire, in 1972, and there, she served on the Planning Board and was active in the community.

=== Campaign finance reform advocate ===
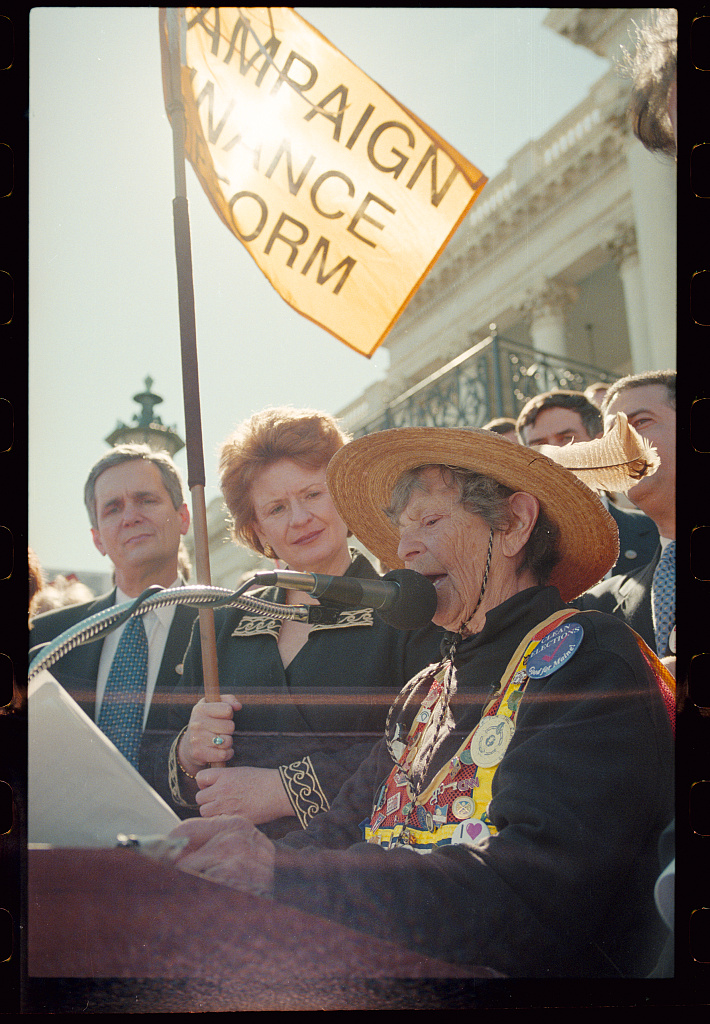
Doris "Granny D" Haddock speaking at a lectern outside the U.S. Capitol after her walk from Los Angeles to Washington, D.C.

After the first efforts of Senators John McCain and Russ Feingold to regulate campaign finances through eliminating soft money failed in 1995, Granny D became increasingly interested in campaign finance reform and spearheaded a petition movement. On January 1, 1999, at the age of 88, Granny D left the Rose Bowl Tournament of Roses Parade in Pasadena, California, in an attempt to walk across the United States to raise awareness of and attract support for campaign finance reform.

Granny D walked roughly ten miles each day for 14 months, traversing California, Arizona, New Mexico, Texas, Arkansas, Tennessee, Kentucky, Ohio, West Virginia, Maryland, Virginia, and the District of Columbia, making many speeches along the way. The trek attracted a great deal of attention in the mass media. When Granny D arrived in Washington, D.C., she was 90 years old (having begun the journey at 88 and having two birthdays en route), had traveled more than 3,200 miles, and was greeted in the capital by a crowd of 2,200 people. Several dozen members of Congress walked the final miles with her during the final day's walk from Arlington National Cemetery to the Capitol on the National Mall. A film, "Granny D Goes to Washington," by Alidra Solday, documents her walk across America, and was broadcast on PBS stations nationwide, 2006-2008.

In the 2000 presidential election, Haddock endorsed Green Party candidate Ralph Nader.

Haddock worked closely with state representative Betty Hall, another New Hampshire grandmother, on campaign finance reform.

=== Arrest at the Capitol ===
On April 21, 2000, 90 year old Granny D, with 31 other Americans, was arrested for reading the Declaration of Independence in the Capitol and charged with the offense of Demonstrating in the Capitol Building. It was said to be a peaceable assembly, but the demonstrators were arrested by Capitol Police.

She entered a plea of guilty, then made a statement to the court reiterating "campaign finance reform" as the purpose of their demonstration.

Your Honor, the old woman who stands before you was arrested for reading the Declaration of Independence in America's Capitol Building. I did not raise my voice to do so and I blocked no hall.

...

I was reading from the Declaration of Independence to make the point that we must declare our independence from the corrupting bonds of big money in our election campaigns.

...

In my 90 years, this is the first time I have been arrested. I risk my good name --for I do indeed care what my neighbors think about me. But, Your Honor, some of us do not have much power, except to put our bodies in the way of an injustice--to picket, to walk, or to just stand in the way. It will not change the world overnight, but it is all we can do.

...

Your Honor, to the business at hand: the old woman who stands before you was arrested for reading the Declaration of Independence in America's Capitol Building. I did not raise my voice to do so and I blocked no hall. But if it is a crime to read the Declaration of Independence in our great hall, then I am guilty.

The judge sentenced Granny D and her companions to time served and a $10 administrative fee.

== Post-election ==
"Granny D" co-authored several books with Dennis Burke. These include Granny D: Walking Across America in My Ninetieth Year (Villard, 2001), Granny D: You're Never Too Old to Raise a Little Hell (Villard, 2003), and Granny D's American Century (University Press of New England, 2012). She was awarded an honorary degree by Franklin Pierce College on October 21, 2002. In 2005, she gave the commencement speech at Hampshire College.

She was the Democratic candidate for a U.S. Senate seat in New Hampshire during the 2004 election when the leading Democratic primary candidate, Burt Cohen, a member of the New Hampshire State Senate from the 24th district, left the race unexpectedly (days before the filing deadline), because of a campaign-finance scandal. Haddock was, at 94, one of the oldest major-party candidates to ever run for the U.S. Senate. True to her "clean elections" ideals, Haddock funded her late-entry campaign by accepting only modest private-citizen donations. She captured approximately 34 percent of the vote (221,549), losing to incumbent Republican U.S. Senator Judd Gregg, as he sought his third term. Gregg won about 66 percent (434,847) of the ballot.

In 2007, HBO released a documentary, Run Granny Run, directed by Marlo Poras, about "Granny D"'s 2004 Senate campaign. In 2009, she founded Coalition for Open Democracy. Granny D continued to be active in politics to the end of her life, and celebrated her 98th, 99th and 100th birthdays by lobbying for campaign finance reform at the New Hampshire State House.

== Awards ==
Key to the city:

- Austin, Texas
- Birmingham, Alabama
- Clarksburg, West Virginia
- Davenport, Iowa
- Ferndale, Michigan
- Fort Worth, Texas
- Keene, New Hampshire
- Las Cruces, New Mexico
- Lordsburg, New Mexico
- Parker, Arizona
- Parkersburg, West Virginia
- Tombstone, Arizona
- Upland, California

In 2000, Granny D received a special Martin Luther King Award from the Manchester, New Hampshire-based Martin Luther King Coalition. She was the keynote speaker for that year's Martin Luther King Day Community Celebration in Manchester.

== Electoral history ==
United States Senate election in New Hampshire, 2004
Party	Candidate	Votes	%
Republican	Judd Gregg (inc.)	434,847	66.2
Democratic	Doris Haddock	221,549	34.7
Write-in		690	0.1
Total votes		657,086	100
Republican hold			

== See also ==
- Bipartisan Campaign Reform Act, "McCain-Feingold"
- Peace Pilgrim

Party political offices
Preceded by George Condodemetraky	Democratic nominee for U.S. Senator from New Hampshire (Class 3); 2004	Succeeded by Paul Hodes
