= Ralph D. Hough =

American politician

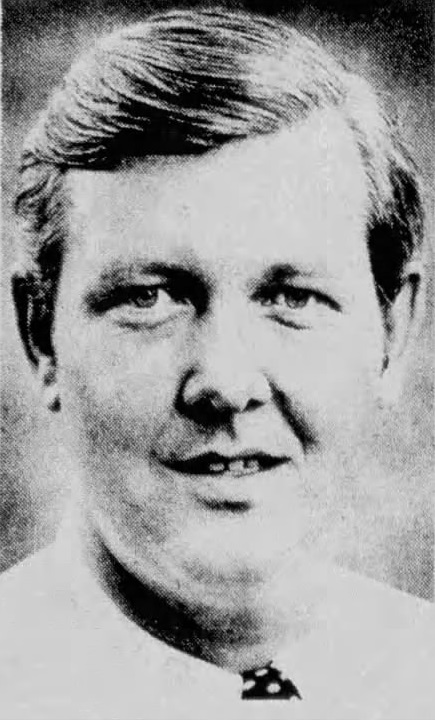
- Valley News (Lebanon, New Hampshire), June 29, 1978

Acting Governor of New Hampshire
- In office January 2, 1993 – January 7, 1993
- Preceded by: Judd Gregg
- Succeeded by: Steve Merrill

President of the New Hampshire Senate
- In office 1993–1994
- Preceded by: Ed Dupont
- Succeeded by: Joseph L. Delahunty

Member of the New Hampshire Senate from the 5th district
- In office 1979–1995
- Preceded by: David Hammond Bradley
- Succeeded by: Jim Rubens

Personal details
- Born: May 21, 1943 (age 83) Hanover, New Hampshire, U.S.
- Party: Democratic

Ralph Degnan Hough (born May 21, 1943) is an American politician who served as acting governor of New Hampshire for roughly a week in January 1993. Though now a registered Democrat, he was a Republican during his time in state government.

Hough was born in Hanover, New Hampshire in 1943. He served as President of the New Hampshire Senate from 1993 to 1994. Governor Judd Gregg resigned from office January 2, 1993, in order to take his seat in the United States Senate. Governor-elect Steve Merrill's term as governor did not begin until January 7 in accordance to the Constitution of New Hampshire, therefore Hough, as first in line of succession to the gubernatorial powers and duties, served as acting governor for five days. In 1994, he was defeated for re-nomination to his senate seat in the Republican primary by Jim Rubens.

Political offices
Preceded by Judd Gregg	Acting Governor of New Hampshire; 1993	Succeeded by Steve Merrill
