= The Pledge (New Hampshire) =

American political tradition

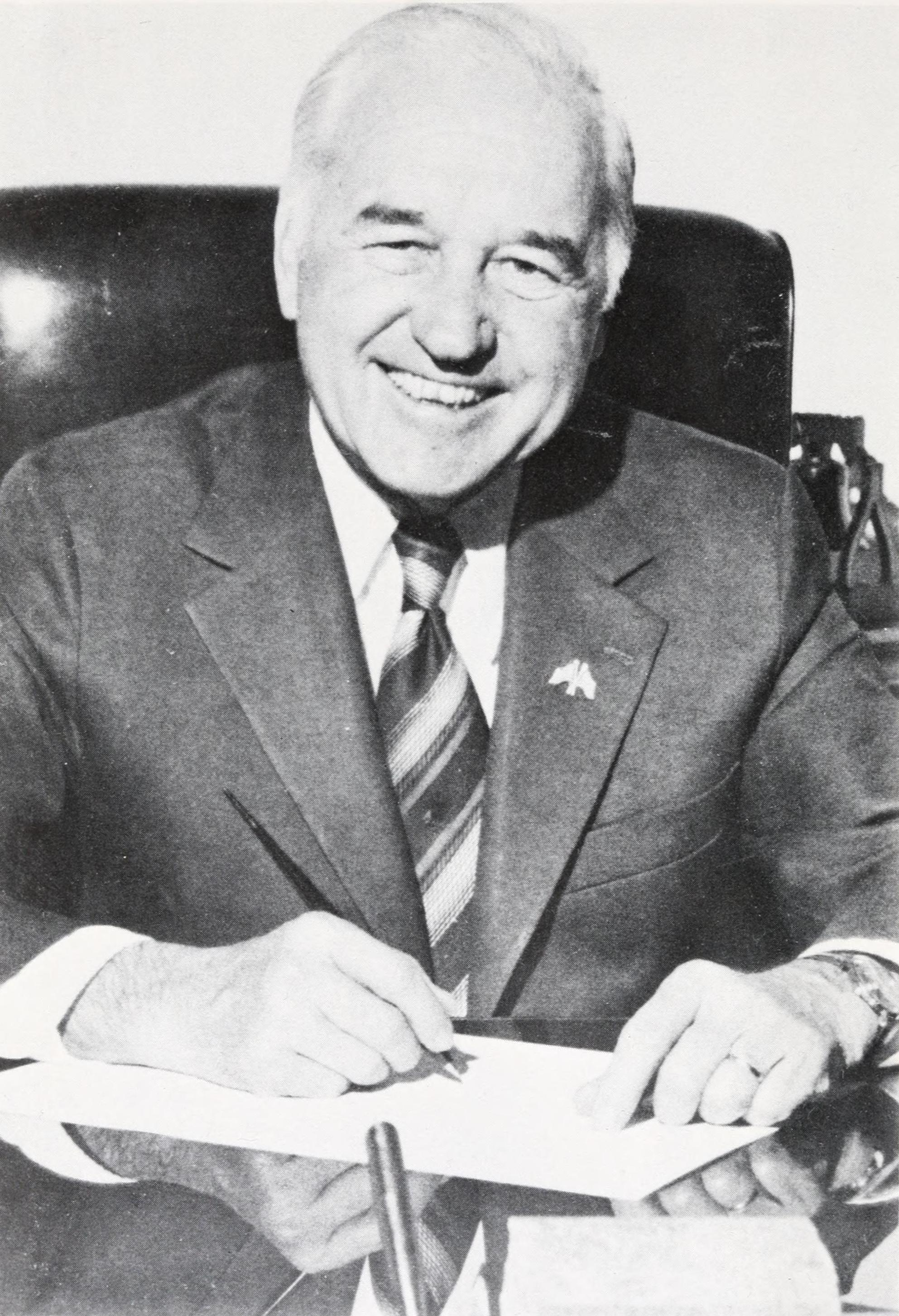
Former New Hampshire Gov. Meldrim Thomson, who popularized The Pledge.

The Pledge is a term used in the U.S. state of New Hampshire for a promise by politicians not to support income taxes or sales taxes or other forms of what are known as "broad-based taxes." It has long been an important part of state politics, dating back to the 1950s, although it only become prominent in the 1970s. In the 1972 state Republican Primary, Meldrim Thomson Jr. ousted then incumbent governor Republican Walter Peterson by, in part, promising to never raise an income or sales tax in the state. Since that election, it has become a pledge taken by almost every winning gubernatorial candidate.

Advocates describe it as an important tool in New Hampshire's budgetary process, an embodiment of the state's tradition of frugality and local control. Opponents say it creates a lop-sided and unfair tax structure, overly dependent on property taxes on individuals.

== Effect on State Budget ==
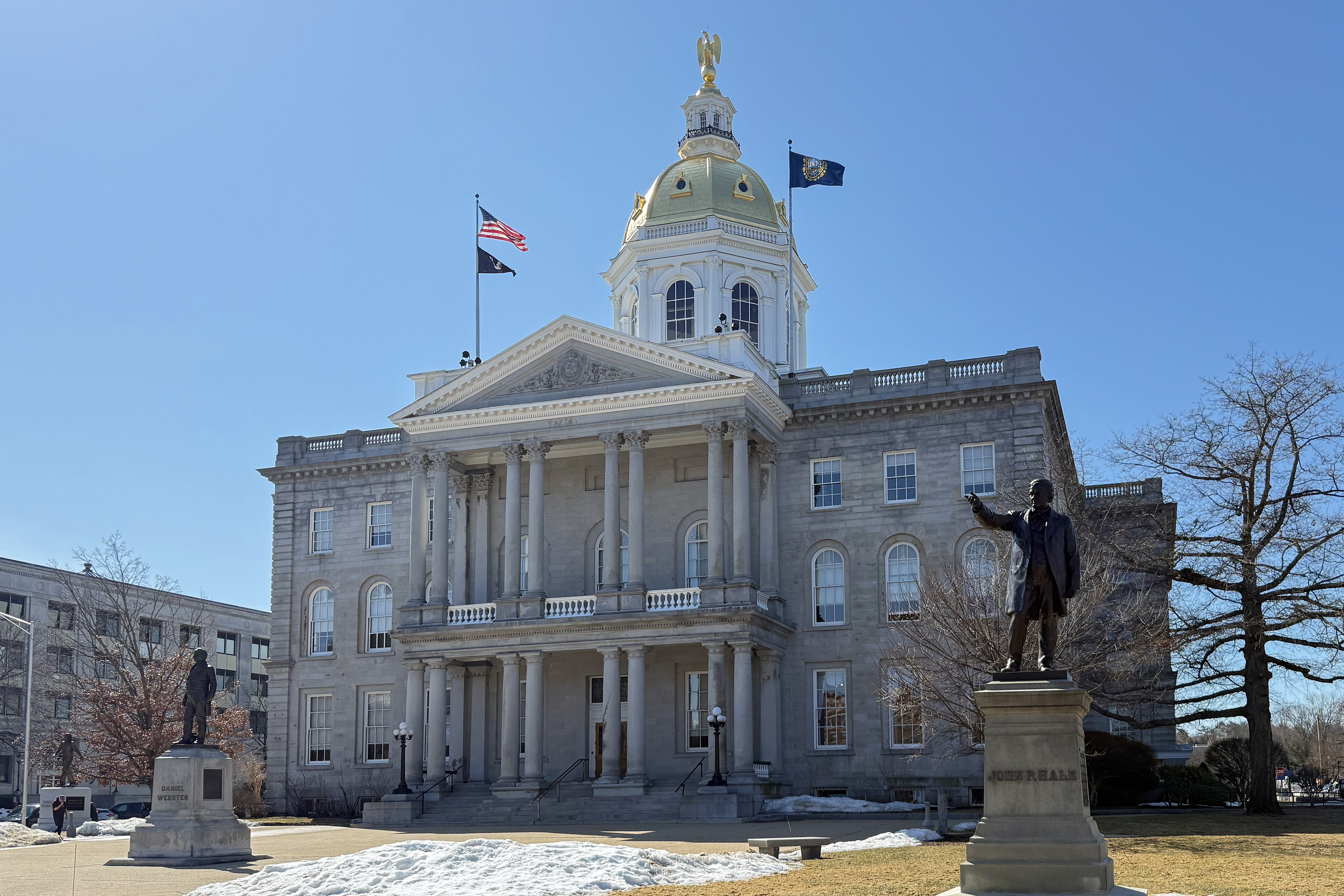
The New Hampshire State House in Concord, NH

=== Revenue ===
The implication of The Pledge is that overall the state has chosen to bring in less revenue compared to its neighbors in New England, and compared to other states throughout the country as a whole. New Hampshire's state taxes are lower than every other state in the nation except for Alaska, as of fiscal year 2021. This is slightly offset by higher local taxes, mainly local property taxes. As of 2022, 61% of local tax revenue in the state came from property taxes. This is higher than any other state in the United States.

=== Spending ===
New Hampshire has chosen to spend less overall on public projects and services in part because of its lower revenue. In 2019, state and local government spending accounted for 15.2 percent of the state's gross domestic product, below the national average of 18.6 percent. Only three states, Connecticut, Georgia, and South Dakota, had a lower share.
