= 1996 New Hampshire gubernatorial election =

- November 5, 1996
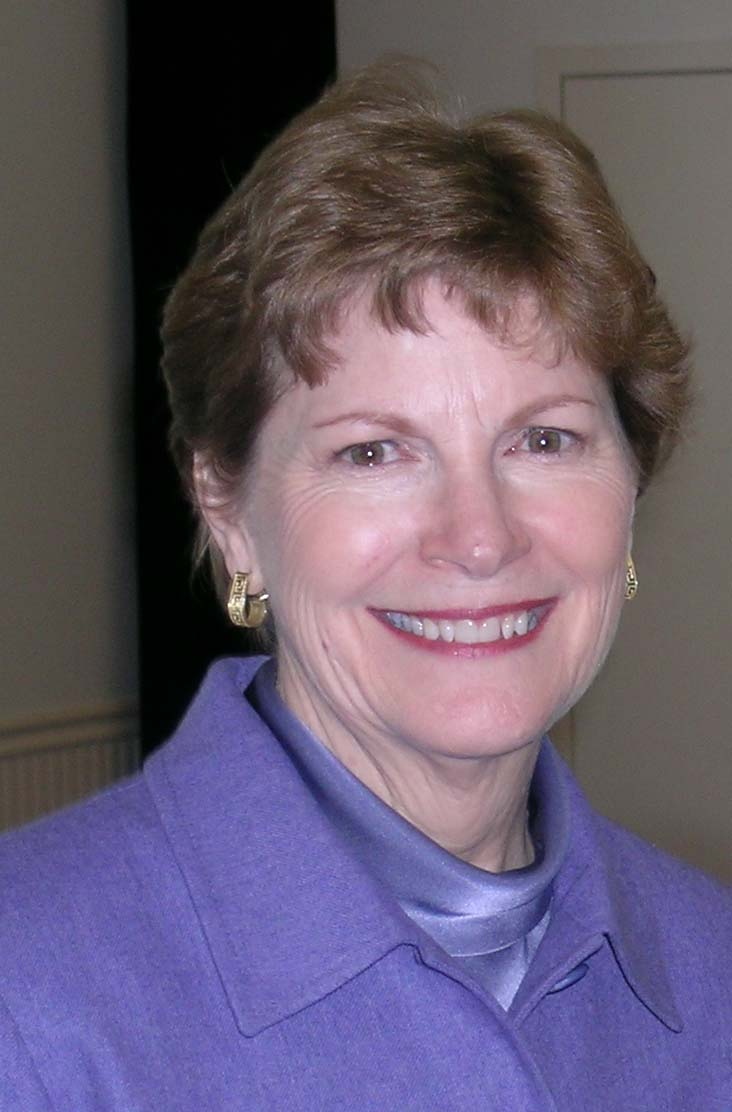

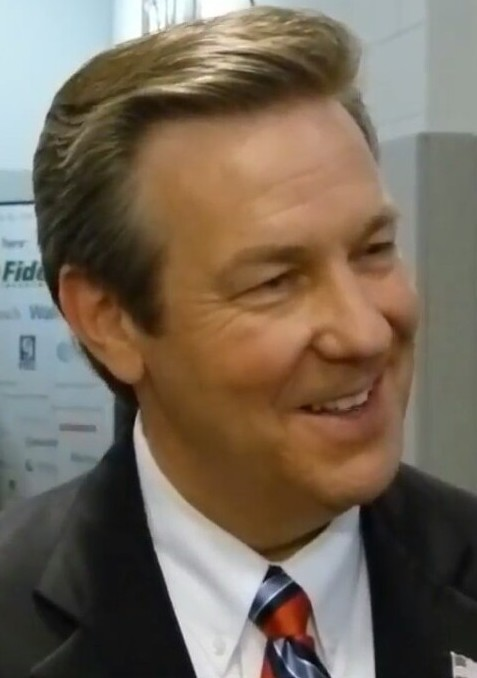
Nominee	Jeanne Shaheen	Ovide Lamontagne
Party	Democratic	Republican
Popular vote	284,175	196,321
Percentage	57.17%	39.50%
- Shaheen: 40–50% 50–60% 60–70% 70–80% >90% Lamontagne: 40–50% 50–60% 60–70% 80–90%
Governor before election
Steve Merrill
Republican
Elected Governor
Jeanne Shaheen
Democratic

The 1996 New Hampshire gubernatorial election took place on November 5, 1996. State Senator Jeanne Shaheen won the election, marking the first time since 1980 that a Democrat was elected Governor of New Hampshire. She defeated Ovide Lamontagne, who had defeated representative Bill Zeliff for the Republican nomination.

== Election results ==
New Hampshire gubernatorial election, 1996
Party	Candidate	Votes	%	±%
Democratic	Jeanne Shaheen	284,175	57.17%	+31.62%
Republican	Ovide Lamontagne	196,321	39.50%	−30.44%
Independent	Fred Bramante	10,316	2.08%	
Libertarian	Robert Kingsbury	5,974	1.20%	−3.20%
Write-ins		254	0.05%	
Majority		87,854	17.68%	−26.71%
Turnout		497,040		
Democratic gain from Republican		Swing		
