= 2004 United States Senate election in New Hampshire =

- November 2, 2004
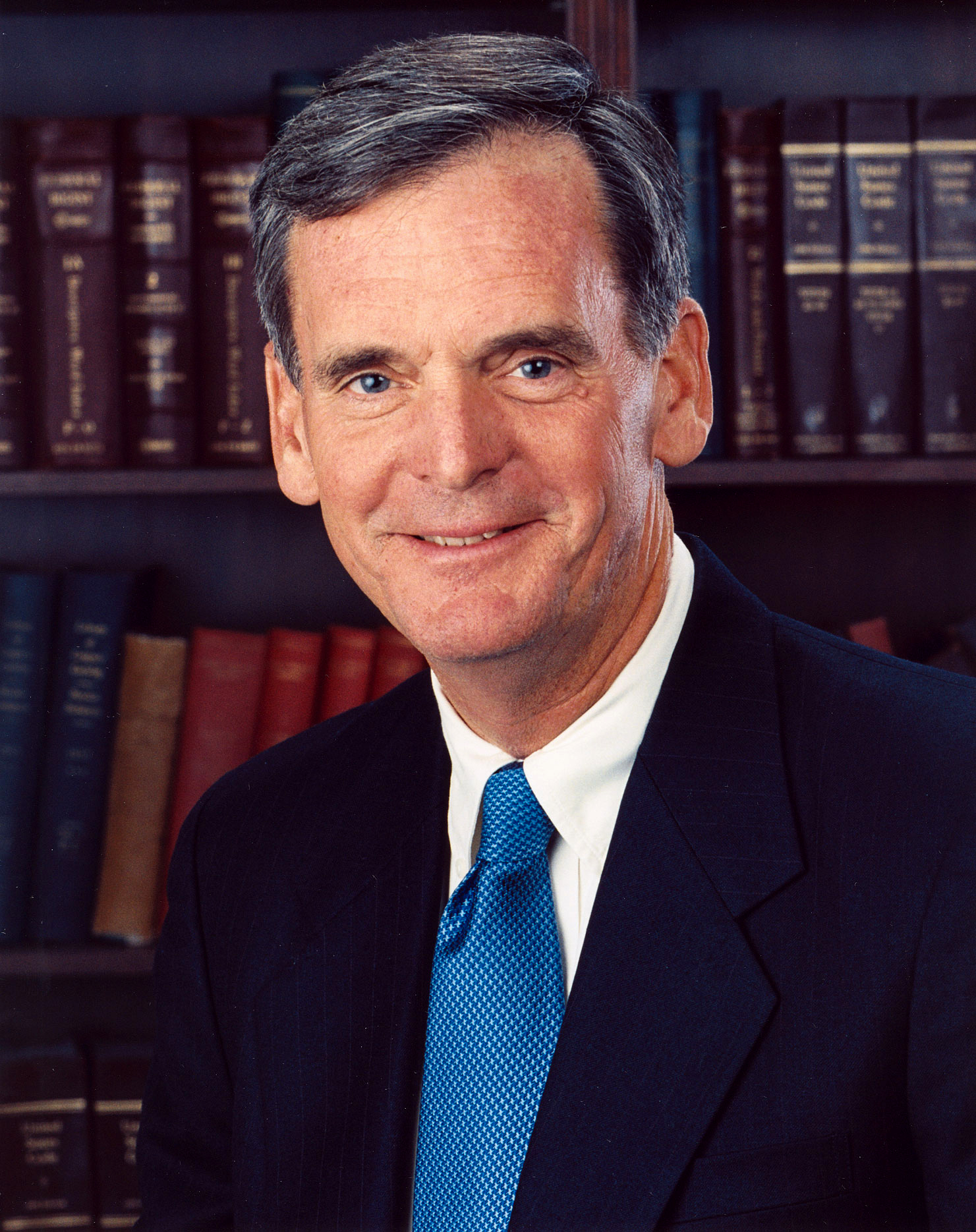

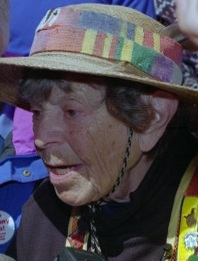
Nominee	Judd Gregg	Doris Haddock
Party	Republican	Democratic
Popular vote	434,847	221,549
Percentage	66.24%	33.75%
- Gregg: 50–60% 60–70% 70–80% 80–90% >90% Haddock: 50–60% 60–70% 80–90% Tie: 50%
U.S. senator before election
Judd Gregg
Republican
Elected U.S. Senator
Judd Gregg
Republican

The 2004 United States Senate election in New Hampshire took place on November 2, 2004. Incumbent Republican Senator Judd Gregg ran for re-election. After winning the Republican primary, he faced Doris Haddock, a campaign finance reform activist. Haddock, 94 years old at the time of the election, would have been the oldest person to become a freshman Senator in history. Gregg ultimately defeated Haddock in a landslide, winning 66 percent of the vote to Haddock's 34 percent.This was the last time that a male candidate won a U.S. Senate election in New Hampshire, until Chris Pappas was elected in 2026.

== Democratic primary ==
Burt Cohen, a member of the New Hampshire State Senate from the 24th district, was the original frontrunner for the Democratic nomination. However, he dropped out shortly before the candidate filing deadline due to a campaign finance scandal in which his campaign manager and funds had gone missing, leading to Doris Haddock being the only Democratic candidate left in the primary.

=== Candidates ===
- Doris Haddock, campaign finance reform activist

=== Results ===
Democratic primary results
Party	Candidate	Votes	%
Democratic	Doris Haddock	46,745	99.19%
Democratic	Write-ins	381	0.81%
Total votes		47,126	100.00%

== Republican primary ==
=== Candidates ===
- Judd Gregg, incumbent U.S. Senator
- Tom Alciere, former State Representative
- Michael D. Tipa, retired U.S. Army Lieutenant Colonel

=== Results ===
Republican primary results
Party	Candidate	Votes	%
Republican	Judd Gregg (inc.)	60,597	91.83%
Republican	Tom Alciere	2,682	4.06%
Republican	Michael D. Tipa	2,563	3.88%
Republican	Write-ins	143	0.22%
Total votes		65,985	100.00%

== General election ==
=== Predictions ===
Source	Ranking	As of
Sabato's Crystal Ball	Safe R	November 1, 2004

=== Results ===
2004 United States Senate election in New Hampshire
Party	Candidate	Votes	%	±%
Republican	Judd Gregg (inc.)	434,847	66.24%	−1.60%
Democratic	Doris Haddock	221,549	33.75%	+5.50%
Write-in		690	0.01%	N/A
Majority		213,298	32.49%	−7.10%
Total votes		656,498	100.00%	
Republican hold				

==== Results by county ====
County	Judd Gregg Republican		Doris Haddock Democratic		All others		Margin		Total votes cast
County	#	%	#	%	#	%	#	%	Total votes cast
Belknap	22,949	72.6%	8,643	27.3%	21	0.1%	14,306	45.3%	31,613
Carroll	18,663	67.8%	8,868	32.2%	13	0.1%	9,795	35.6%	27,544
Cheshire	21,901	54.6%	18,116	45.2%	73	0.2%	3,785	9.4%	40,090
Coös	11,819	71.6%	4,684	28.4%	11	0.1%	7,135	43.2%	16,514
Grafton	27,323	60.2%	17,990	39.7%	59	0.1%	9,333	20.5%	45,372
Hillsborough	128,739	68.0%	60,409	31.9%	187	0.1%	68,330	36.1%	189,335
Merrimack	49,804	66.4%	25,117	33.5%	79	0.1%	24,687	32.9%	75,000
Rockingham	104,087	68.0%	48,739	31.9%	142	0.1%	55,348	36.1%	152,968
Strafford	36,321	63.2%	21,037	36.6%	86	0.1%	15,284	26.6%	57,444
Sullivan	13,241	62.4%	7,946	37.5%	19	0.1%	5,295	24.9%	21,206
Totals	434,847	66.2%	221,549	33.7%	690	0.1%	213,298	32.5%	657,086

== See also ==
- 2004 United States Senate elections
