= William S. Bartlett Jr. =

American politician

William S. Bartlett Jr. served as President of the New Hampshire Senate from 1987 to 1990.
