= Sheila Roberge =

American politician

Member of the New Hampshire Senate from the 9th district
- In office 1984-2010
- Succeeded by: Andy Sanborn

Personal details
- Born: Manchester, New Hampshire
- Party: Republican

Sheila Roberge was a Republican member of the New Hampshire Senate, representing the 9th District from 1984 to 2010.
