= 1992 United States Senate election in New Hampshire =

- November 3, 1992

Nominee	Judd Gregg	John Rauh
Party	Republican	Democratic
Popular vote	249,591	234,982
Percentage	48.17%	45.35%
- Gregg: 40–50% 50–60% 60–70% 70–80% 80–90% >90% Rauh: 40–50% 50–60% 60–70% 80–90% Brady: >90% Tie: 50%
U.S. senator before election
Warren Rudman
Republican
Elected U.S. Senator
Judd Gregg
Republican

The 1992 United States Senate election in New Hampshire took place on November 3, 1992. Incumbent Republican Senator Warren Rudman declined to seek re-election. Governor Judd Gregg won the Republican primary to succeed him, and faced businessman John Rauh, the Democratic nominee, in the general election. Gregg narrowly defeated Rauh, winning 48 percent of the vote to Rauh's 45 percent, his narrowest victory in any statewide race.

== Democratic primary ==
=== Candidates ===
- John Rauh, Sunapee businessman, 1990 Democratic candidate for the U.S. Senate
- Brenda J. Elias, Mayor of Franklin
- Terry Bennett, Rochester physician
- Jeanne Stapleton, John Stark Regional High School teacher
- Lynn Rudmin Chong, former instructor at Plymouth State College

=== Results ===
Democratic primary results
Party	Candidate	Votes	%
Democratic	John Rauh	41,923	50.87%
Democratic	Brenda J. Elias	15,943	19.35%
Democratic	Terry Bennett	11,699	14.20%
Democratic	Jeanne Stapleton	7,804	9.47%
Democratic	Lynn Rudmin Chong	3,836	4.65%
Democratic	Write-ins	1,203	1.46%
Total votes		33,383	100.00%

== Republican primary ==
=== Candidates ===
- Judd Gregg, Governor of New Hampshire
- Hal Eckman, Bedford construction company owner
- Jean T. White, State Senator
- Mark W. Farnham, former Mayor of Lebanon

=== Results ===
Republican primary results
Party	Candidate	Votes	%
Republican	Judd Gregg	57,141	49.92%
Republican	Hal Eckman	43,744	38.21%
Republican	Jean T. White	10,642	9.30%
Republican	Mark W. Farnham	2,295	2.00%
Republican	Write-ins	654	0.57%
Total votes		114,476	100.00%

== Libertarian primary ==
=== Candidates ===
- Katherine M. Alexander, software engineer
- Warren K. Ross, retired firefighter

=== Results ===
Libertarian primary results
Party	Candidate	Votes	%
Libertarian	Katherine M. Alexander	1,210	72.41%
Libertarian	Warren K. Ross	396	23.70%
Libertarian	Write-ins	65	3.89%
Total votes		1,671	100.00%

== General election ==
=== Results ===
1992 United States Senate election in New Hampshire
Party	Candidate	Votes	%	±%
Republican	Judd Gregg	249,591	48.17%	−14.79%
Democratic	John Rauh	234,982	45.35%	+12.98%
Libertarian	Katherine M. Alexander	18,214	3.52%	—
Independent	Larry Brady	9,340	1.80%	—
Independent	Kenneth E. Blevens, Sr.	4,752	0.92%	—
Natural Law	David Haight	1,291	0.25%	—
Majority		14,609	2.82%	−27.77%
Total votes		518,170	100.00%	
Republican hold				

== See also ==
- 1992 United States Senate elections
