= Judd Gregg =

American politician (born 1947)

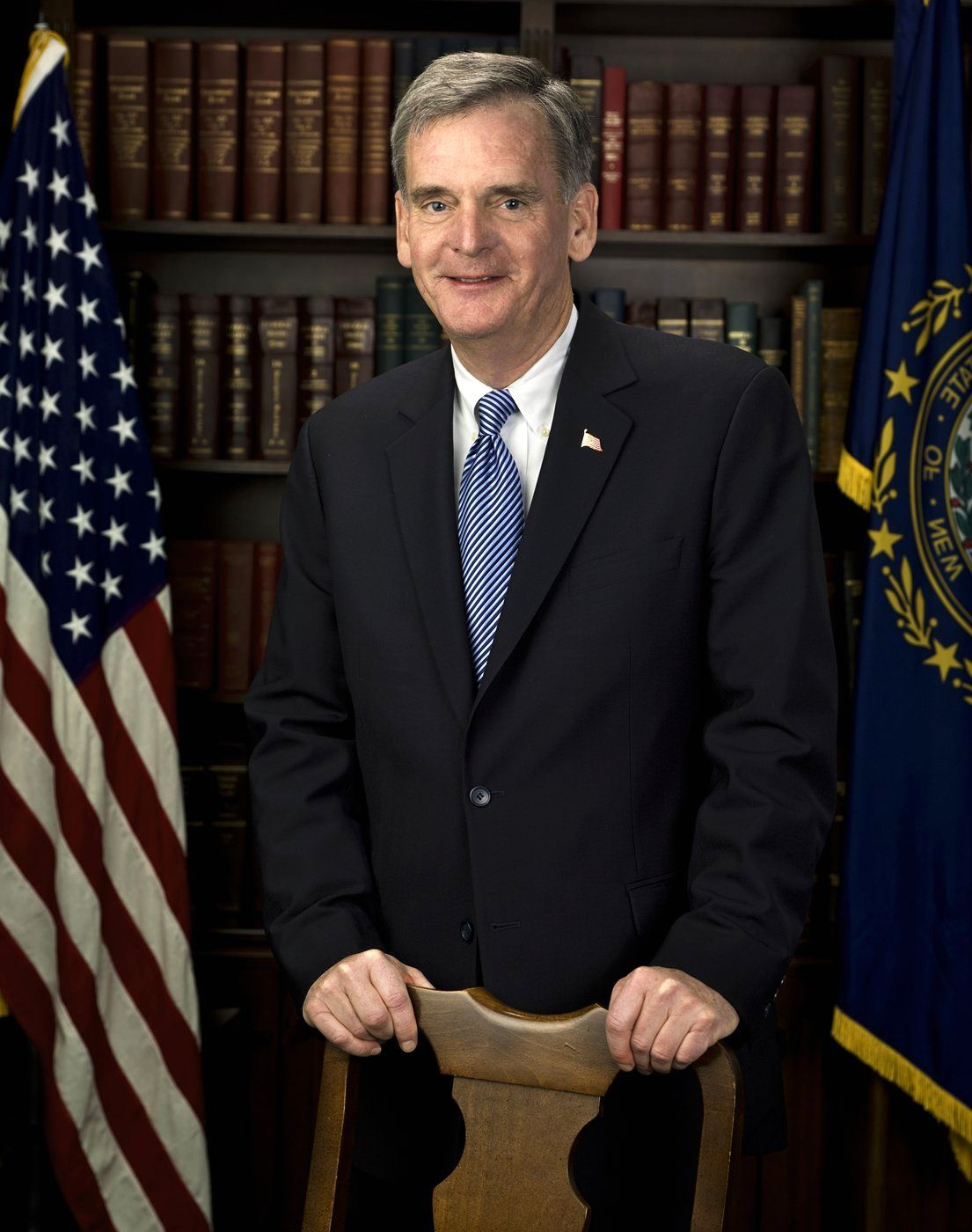
- Official portrait, 2009

Chair of the Senate Budget Committee
- In office January 3, 2005 – January 3, 2007
- Preceded by: Don Nickles
- Succeeded by: Kent Conrad

Chair of the Senate Health Committee
- In office January 3, 2003 – January 3, 2005
- Preceded by: Ted Kennedy
- Succeeded by: Mike Enzi

United States Senator from New Hampshire
- In office January 3, 1993 – January 3, 2011
- Preceded by: Warren Rudman
- Succeeded by: Kelly Ayotte

76th Governor of New Hampshire
- In office January 4, 1989 – January 2, 1993
- Preceded by: John H. Sununu
- Succeeded by: Ralph D. Hough (acting)

Member of the U.S. House of Representatives from New Hampshire's 2nd district
- In office January 3, 1981 – January 3, 1989
- Preceded by: James Colgate Cleveland
- Succeeded by: Chuck Douglas

Member of the New Hampshire Executive Council from the 5th district
- In office 1979–1981
- Preceded by: Bernard Streeter
- Succeeded by: Bernard Streeter

Personal details
- Born: Judd Alan Gregg; February 14, 1947 (age 79) Nashua, New Hampshire, U.S.
- Party: Republican
- Spouse: Kathleen MacLellan (m. 1973)
- Children: 3
- Education: Columbia University (BA); Boston University (JD, LLM)
- Gregg's voice Gregg on border security. Recorded September 19, 2006

Judd Alan Gregg (born February 14, 1947) is an American politician, businessman and attorney who served as the 76th governor of New Hampshire from 1989 to 1993 and a United States senator from New Hampshire from 1993 to 2011 where he was Chairman of the Health Committee and the Budget Committee. He also served in the United States House of Representatives from 1981 to 1989 and the New Hampshire Executive Council from 1979 to 1981.

A member of the Republican Party, he was a businessman and attorney in Nashua before entering politics. Gregg currently serves as the Chair of the Public Advisory Board at the New Hampshire Institute of Politics at Saint Anselm College.

Gregg was nominated for Secretary of Commerce in the Cabinet by President Barack Obama, but withdrew his name on February 12, 2009. He chose not to run for reelection to the Senate in 2010; former State Attorney General Kelly Ayotte, also a Republican, was elected to succeed him.

On May 27, 2011, Goldman Sachs announced that Gregg had been named an international advisor to the firm. In May 2013, Gregg was named the CEO of the Securities Industry and Financial Markets Association, a Wall Street lobbying group. He later stepped down as CEO in December 2013 and became a senior adviser.

== Early life ==
Born in Nashua, New Hampshire, he is the son of Catherine Gregg (née Warner) and Hugh Gregg, who was Governor from 1953 to 1955. Gregg graduated from Phillips Exeter Academy in 1965. Gregg received his baccalaureate from Columbia University in 1969 and, from Boston University School of Law, a Juris Doctor in 1972 and a Master of Laws in 1975. In 1969, during the Vietnam War, Gregg received a 1-Y draft deferment due to having bad knees.

== Early political career ==
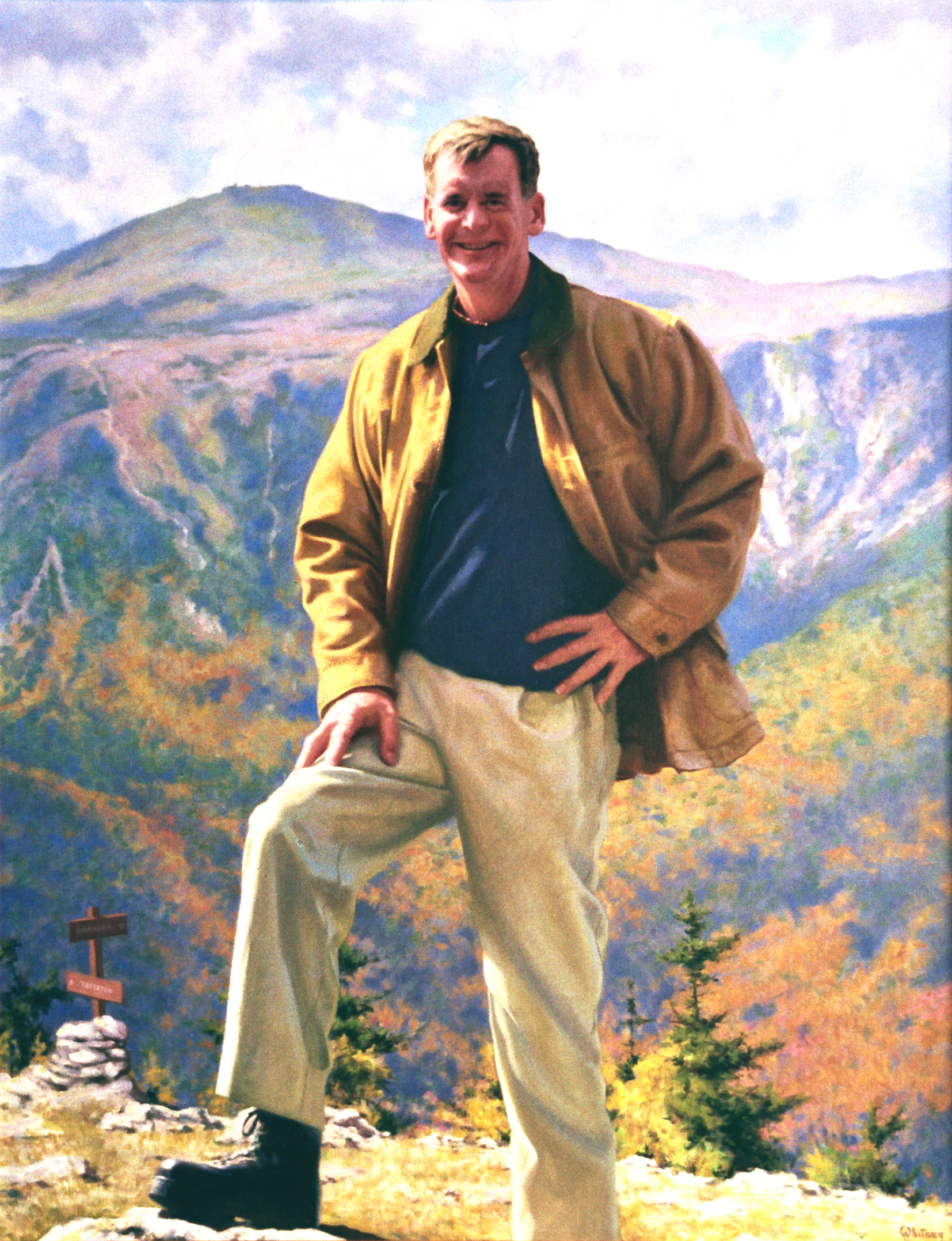
Then-Governor Judd Gregg as painted by Richard Whitney

The first elective office held by Gregg was a seat on the Executive Council of New Hampshire, a post which he held from 1979 to 1981. He was elected to the United States House of Representatives in 1980, and was reelected in 1982, 1984 and 1986.

He declined to run for re-election in 1988, and ran for Governor of New Hampshire instead. He won that election and was re-elected in 1990, New Hampshire being one of two states (Vermont is the other) that continues to elect its governors to two-year, rather than four-year, terms. As Governor, he balanced the budget, leaving the office in 1993 with a $21 million surplus. However, his political opponents in the 1990s attacked Judd for the state's weak economy and his Vietnam War deferments.

== U.S. Senate tenure ==
=== Elections ===
In 1992, Gregg decided to run for the U.S. Senate seat being vacated by two-term Republican Warren Rudman. He defeated Democrat John Rauh, and took his seat as a United States Senator in 1993. He was re-elected to a second term in 1998 after defeating George Condodemetraky. He ran for a third term in 2004 and defeated campaign finance activist Doris "Granny D" Haddock, the then 94-year-old Democratic nominee, by 66% to 34%.

After withdrawing from his nomination to become United States Secretary of Commerce in the presidential administration of Democrat Barack Obama on February 12, 2009, Gregg said he would "probably not" seek reelection in 2010, when his term of office was set to expire.

=== Leadership ===
In January 2005, Gregg was elected to chair the U.S. Senate Committee on Budget by the Senate Republican Conference, and steadfastly supported lower spending.

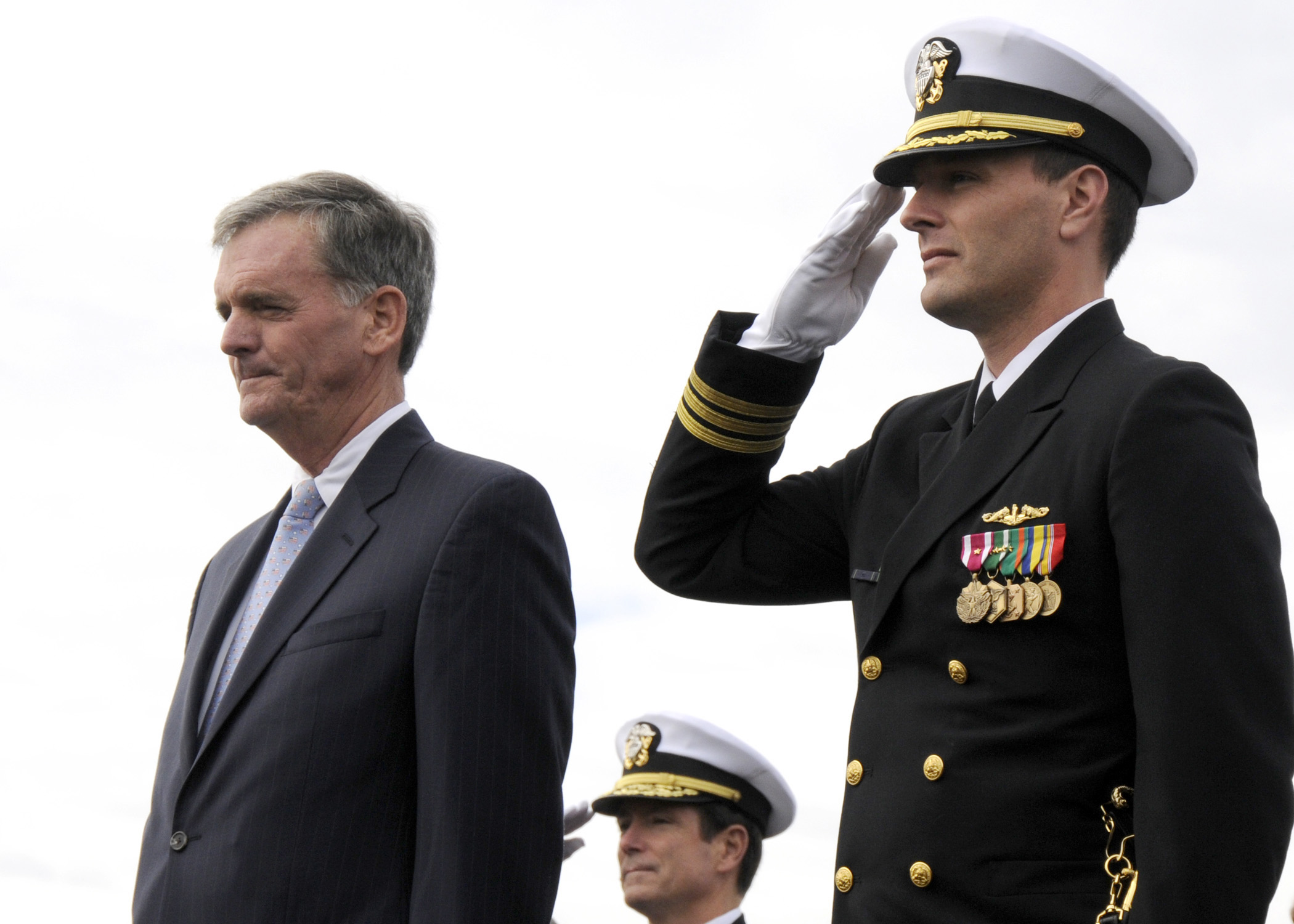
Gregg (left) at the commissioning ceremony for the USS New Hampshire (SSN-778).

On November 14, 2008, Gregg was appointed by United States Senate Minority Leader Mitch McConnell to serve on the five-member Congressional Oversight Panel created to oversee the implementation of the Emergency Economic Stabilization Act. Gregg "stepped aside" on December 1, citing his Senate workload:

I regret that due to the impending Senate schedule involving the potential of dealing with an extremely large stimulus package, coupled with the ongoing issues of developing fiscal policy relative to the budget and the continuing economic downturn and my responsibility for foreign operations appropriations, it has become difficult to continue service on the TARP oversight board. I have advised Senator McConnell I will need to step aside from this effort.

=== Platform ===
A 1998 CBS News profile on Gregg wrote that he "appears moderate as newer, more conservative Senators are elected." The non-partisan National Journal gave then-Senator Gregg a composite ideology rating of 65% conservative and 35% liberal.

Republicans for Environmental Protection issued Gregg an "environmental harm demerit" for sponsoring the 2006 S.C. Resolution 83, which according to REP "included only one revenue-raising instruction to Senate appropriations committees, an abuse of the congressional budget process in order to force oil drilling in the Arctic National Wildlife Refuge", and "would perpetuate America's dangerous oil dependence and damage the most scenic, wildlife-rich reserve in the circumpolar north." Nonetheless, the same organization praised Gregg, together with John E. Sununu, for their work to pass the New England Wilderness act, which classified nearly 100,000 acres (400 km^{2}) of New Hampshire and Vermont as wilderness. In 2006, Gregg received a score of 43% from the nonpartisan League of Conservation Voters.

The University of New Hampshire renamed its Environmental Technology Building Gregg Hall, because Gregg used earmarks to secure $266 million of federal funds for research and development projects for the university. The Judd Gregg Meteorology Institute (JGMI), established in 2003, is the center of meteorological and atmospheric research at Plymouth State University in Plymouth, NH, which offers the only meteorology degree program in the state. The Senator was also instrumental in the establishing of the New Hampshire Institute of Politics at Saint Anselm College in 1999.

In 2007, Gregg voted for the Clean Energy Act of 2007 (H.R. 6) and the Comprehensive Immigration Reform Act of 2007 (S. 1639).

In October 2009, Gregg said, "You talk about systemic risk. The systemic risk today is the Congress of the United States ... we're creating these massive debts which we're passing on to our children ... (the figures) mean we're basically on the path to a banana republic-type of financial situation in this country. "

Gregg has a moderate record on social issues. In June 2006, he joined six of his fellow Republicans in voting against the Federal Marriage Amendment. In April 2007, he was among the breakaway Republicans to support the Stem Cell Research Enhancement Act. However, his record on the issue of abortion is otherwise a solidly anti-abortion one. Gregg has voted for some gun control measures and against others. He voted against the Brady Bill, but in recent years has voted for trigger control locks on firearms and in favor of the ban on assault weapons.

On December 17, 2009, Gregg voted to extend Chairman Ben Bernanke's term.

=== Presidential politics ===
During the 2004 Presidential Election, Gregg stood in for John Kerry during practice sessions held by George W. Bush in preparation for the 2004 United States Presidential Election Debates. Four years earlier he had played the part of Al Gore for the same purpose.

On October 29, 2007, Gregg endorsed Mitt Romney, former Governor of Massachusetts, to be the Republican nominee for President of the United States. For the 2016 presidential election Gregg endorsed former Florida Governor Jeb Bush, and upon Bush's suspension of his campaign Gregg endorsed Ohio Governor John Kasich. In 2020, Gregg wrote-in former Speaker of the House Paul Ryan for president. In the 2024 Republican Party presidential primary, he endorsed Nikki Haley.

Gregg had not foreclosed the possibility of running for President himself after he left the Senate but he did say it was "not likely":

In New Hampshire we like to have a variety of candidates, so I would seriously doubt that. I expect to be actively involved in the presidential primary. That's the fun on coming from New Hampshire and being in office," Gregg said. "I don't rule out anything in my future. Let's face it -- that's not likely and I wouldn't expect to be doing that," he added.

=== The Spanish Justice System and Guantanamo Bay ===
In April 2009, Senator Gregg was sent to accompany an American diplomat to speak with a Spanish diplomat Luis Felipe Fernández de la Peña after a war crimes case was filed by Spanish NGO Association for the Dignity of Spanish Prisoners at the Audiencia Nacional of Spain accusing them of crimes in Iraq and Guantanamo Bay. The case targeted six former US government officials for allegedly violating the Geneva Convention, the 1984 Convention Against Torture, and the 1998 Rome Statute. The six accused were: Alberto Gonzales, David Addington, William Haynes, Douglas Feith, Jay Bybee, and John Yoo.

=== Controversies ===
In the Senate, Gregg was the leading Republican negotiator and author of the TARP program, which bailed out financial institutions, while he had a multimillion-dollar investment in Bank of America. After leaving the Senate Gregg became an advisor to the investment bank Goldman Sachs.

In February 2009, the Associated Press reported that Gregg and his family had profited personally from federal earmarks secured by the senator for the redevelopment of the Pease Air Force Base in Portsmouth, New Hampshire into an industrial park. According to Senate records, Gregg has collected from $240,017 to $651,801 from his investments in Pease Air Force Base, while helping to arrange at least $66 million in federal aid for the former base. Gregg has denied any wrongdoing in the matter and claimed that his withdrawal from consideration for the Commerce Secretary was unrelated to the White House's discovery during the vetting process of his involvement in his family's real estate investments in Pease. Gregg explained away his actions by saying, "I've throughout my entire lifetime been involved in my family's businesses and that's just the way our family works. We support each other and our activities."

Gregg as a member of President Barack Obama's deficit commission defended cutting Social Security by quoting Willie Sutton who, when asked why he robbed banks, replied, "because that's where the money is."

== Commerce Secretary nomination and withdrawal ==
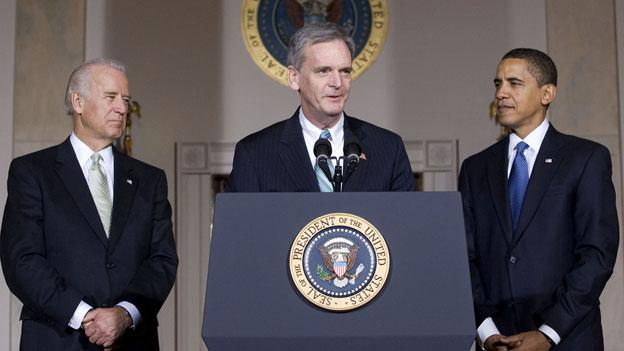
Gregg accepting his nomination

On February 2, 2009, Politico and CNN reported that Gregg accepted President Obama's offer to be the next United States Secretary of Commerce. If Gregg had been confirmed by the Senate, he would have had to resign his Senate seat and be replaced with an appointment by Democratic Governor John Lynch. Sources from both parties confirmed that Gregg's former chief of staff, Republican Bonnie Newman, would have been chosen to replace him. The Washington Post had alleged that Gregg would not accept the appointment unless Governor Lynch agreed to appoint a Republican to fill his seat until 2010. In February 2009, many news outlets noted that Gregg had in 1995 voted to abolish the United States Department of Commerce. Although Gregg stated that he supported the stimulus package promoted by President Obama, he clarified that he would recuse himself from voting on the package.

With reports that the Obama Administration would move the United States Census Bureau, typically run by the Commerce Department, out of Gregg's jurisdiction, Republican leaders urged Obama to allow Gregg to run the census or withdraw Gregg's nomination. On February 12, 2009, Gregg withdrew his name from consideration for the position of United States Commerce Secretary, citing disagreements with issues surrounding the census and the stimulus bill. White House Press Secretary Robert Gibbs issued a statement regarding Gregg's withdrawal in which he accused the senator of not following through on his alleged statements of support for Obama's economic agenda made during the vetting process:

Senator Gregg reached out to the President and offered his name for Secretary of Commerce. He was very clear throughout the interviewing process that despite past disagreements about policies, he would support, embrace, and move forward with the President's agenda. Once it became clear after his nomination that Senator Gregg was not going to be supporting some of President Obama's key economic priorities, it became necessary for Senator Gregg and the Obama administration to part ways. We regret that he has had a change of heart.

While speaking to press afterward, Gregg acknowledged responsibility for his decision and accepted the blame for accepting and then rejecting the Commerce Secretary nomination.

In an interview response to the AP, Gregg was quoted as saying,

For 30 years, I've been my own person in charge of my own views, and I guess I hadn't really focused on the job of working for somebody else and carrying their views, and so this is basically where it came out.

In February 2009, the Associated Press reported that Gregg and his family had profited personally from federal earmarks secured by the Senator for the redevelopment of the Pease Air Force Base into an industrial park. According to Senate records, Gregg has collected from $240,017 to $651,801 from his investments in Pease Air Force Base, while helping to arrange at least $66 million in federal aid for the former base. Gregg claimed that his withdrawal from consideration for the Commerce Secretary was unrelated to the White House's discovery during the vetting process of his involvement in his family's real estate investments in Pease.

== Personal life ==
Gregg belongs to the Congregationalist Church. He is married to Kathleen MacLellan Gregg. They have two daughters, Molly and Sarah, and a son, Joshua.

Gregg won more than $850,000 in 2005 from the D.C. Lottery after buying $20 worth of Powerball tickets at a Washington, D.C. convenience store.

== See also ==
- Unsuccessful nominations to the Cabinet of the United States

U.S. House of Representatives
Preceded by James Cleveland	Member of the U.S. House of Representatives from New Hampshire's 2nd congressional district 1981–1989	Succeeded by Charles Douglas
Party political offices
Preceded by John Sununu	Republican nominee for Governor of New Hampshire; 1988, 1990	Succeeded by Steve Merrill
Preceded by Warren Rudman	Republican nominee for U.S. Senator from New Hampshire (Class 3); 1992, 1998, 2004	Succeeded by Kelly Ayotte
Political offices
Preceded by John Sununu	Governor of New Hampshire; 1989–1993	Succeeded by Ralph Hough; Acting
U.S. Senate
Preceded by Warren Rudman	U.S. Senator (Class 3) from New Hampshire; 1993–2011; Served alongside: Bob Smith, John Sununu, Jeanne Shaheen	Succeeded by Kelly Ayotte
Preceded by Ted Kennedy	Ranking Member of the Senate Health Committee; 2001–2003	Succeeded by Ted Kennedy
Preceded by Ted Kennedy	Chair of the Senate Health Committee; 2003–2005	Succeeded by Mike Enzi
Preceded by Don Nickles	Chair of the Senate Budget Committee; 2005–2007	Succeeded by Kent Conrad
Preceded by Kent Conrad	Ranking Member of the Senate Budget Committee; 2007–2011	Succeeded by Jeff Sessions
U.S. order of precedence (ceremonial)
Preceded by Ben Cardin as Former U.S. Senator	Order of precedence of the United States as Former U.S. Senator	Succeeded by Al D'Amato as Former U.S. Senator
