= Steve Merrill =

American politician and lawyer (1946–2020)

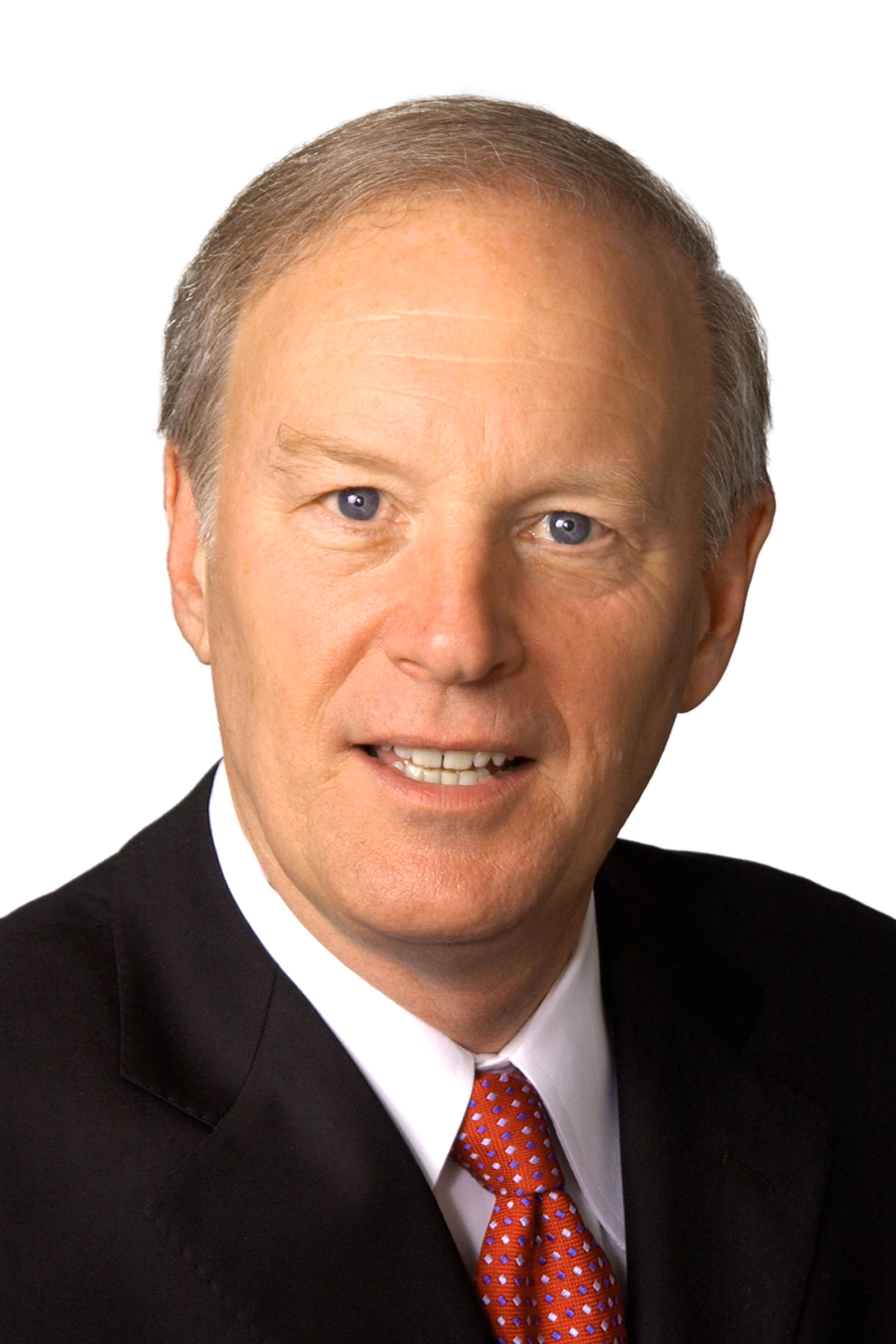
- Merrill in 2006

77th Governor of New Hampshire
- In office January 7, 1993 – January 9, 1997
- Preceded by: Ralph D. Hough (acting)
- Succeeded by: Jeanne Shaheen

Attorney General of New Hampshire
- In office 1985–1989
- Governor: John H. Sununu
- Preceded by: Gregory H. Smith
- Succeeded by: John Arnold

Personal details
- Born: Stephen Everett Merrill; June 21, 1946 Norwich, Connecticut, U.S.
- Died: September 5, 2020 (aged 74) Manchester, New Hampshire, U.S.
- Party: Republican
- Spouse: Heather Merrill
- Children: 2
- Education: University of New Hampshire (BA); Georgetown University (JD)

Stephen Everett Merrill (June 21, 1946 – September 5, 2020) was an American lawyer and Republican politician from Manchester, New Hampshire. He served as the 77th governor of New Hampshire from 1993 to 1997.

== Early life ==
Merrill was born in Norwich, Connecticut but moved to New Hampshire at an early age. He graduated from Winnacunnet High School in Hampton, New Hampshire and the University of New Hampshire. He received his Juris Doctor degree from Georgetown University Law Center in 1972. In 1972, Merrill joined the United States Air Force as a lawyer. From 1973 to 1975 he was legal counsel to the United States Secretary of the Air Force and from 1975 to 1976 was a special assistant to the assistant secretary of the Air Force. He then practiced law in Manchester from 1976 to 1984.

== Political career ==
=== Early career ===
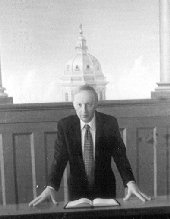
Merrill as Governor

In 1982, Merrill became legal counsel to Governor John H. Sununu. In 1983 he took on the additional role of chief of staff. From 1984 to 1989 was the Attorney General of New Hampshire. As attorney general, Merrill strengthened child abuse laws, backed tougher environmental regulations, formed a task force to combat addiction, and lowered the age at which juveniles could be tried as adults in murder cases to 13. He maintained a high public profile through public appearances and personally trying several cases. He returned to private practice in 1989, starting a firm with Democrat John T. Broderick Jr., whom Merrill would later appoint to the New Hampshire Supreme Court.

=== Governor of New Hampshire ===
Merrill ran as a Republican the 1992 New Hampshire gubernatorial election. He won election on his first try at state office and was reelected in 1994 with seventy percent of the popular vote. Before entering office, Merrill was faced with an anticipated $40 million shortfall in state revenues after a special property tax imposed by outgoing Governor Judd Gregg and the state legislature was declared unconstitutional. Merrill proposed budget cuts and changes to state employees' Workmen's Compensation and state taxes as ways to address the fiscal emergency. By April 1993, the state's economy was beginning to improve. In 1993, Merrill signed an executive order celebrating Martin Luther King Jr. Day. Prior to Merrill's order, the holiday was known as Civil Rights Day due to conservatives' displeasure with King's opposition to the Vietnam War. Merrill signed a similar proclamation each year he was governor and in 1999 the state legislature officially changed the holiday's name. Merrill coined the phrase the "New Hampshire Advantage", which referred to the state's lower taxes and smaller government. He was twice selected as the "most fiscally responsible governor in America" by the Wall Street Journal/Cato Institute. Merrill declined to run for a third term, citing family obligations. In 1997 he ran for chairman of the Republican National Committee, but lost to Jim Nicholson.

== Post political life ==
Merrill served as chairman of Boston-based Bingham Consulting.

== Death ==
Merrill died at his home in Manchester on September 5, 2020, at age 74; his cause of death was not released to the public.

Political offices
Preceded by Gregory H. Smith	Attorney General of New Hampshire; 1985–1989	Succeeded by John Arnold
Preceded by Ralph Hough; Acting	Governor of New Hampshire; 1993–1997	Succeeded by Jeanne Shaheen
Party political offices
Preceded by Judd Gregg	Republican nominee for Governor of New Hampshire; 1992, 1994	Succeeded by Ovide Lamontagne
