= History of the Libertarian Party (United States) =

The Libertarian Party of the United States is an American political party and the world's first explicitly libertarian party. The Libertarian Party originated in 1971 among right-libertarian critics of the Nixon administration.

== 1970s ==
=== Background ===
The founding of the party was prompted in part due to concerns about the Nixon administration's wage and price controls, the Vietnam War, conscription, and the end of the Gold Standard and introduction of fiat money. The party's organizers drew inspiration from the works and ideas of the prominent Austrian school economist Murray Rothbard. These organizers viewed the dominant Republican and Democratic parties as having diverged from what they viewed as the libertarian principles of the American Founding Fathers.

The Committee to Form a Libertarian Party was the precursor to the modern Libertarian Party. It was formed to debate the desirability of a specifically libertarian political force. The committee was founded July 17, 1971 by David Nolan, a Colorado consultant and businessman, and 4 friends to co-ordinate interest in founding a Libertarian Party in the United States.

It was, according to one outreach brochure, preceded by several abortive attempts, including a Libertarian Party in California and a functional Libertarian group in Florida. The Florida Libertarian Party (founded in 1970) achieved an early Libertarian victory, a popular initiative.

=== Formation ===
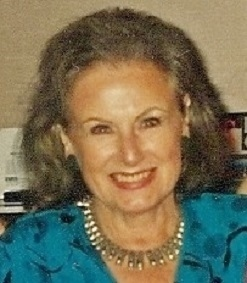
Tonie Nathan at the 1993 Libertarian National Convention in Salt Lake City

In August 1971, the Libertarian Party was conceived at meetings in the home of David Nolan in Westminster, Colorado. This founding group included John Hospers, Edward Crane, Manuel Klausner, Murray Rothbard, Roy Childs, D. Frank Robinson, and Theodora (Tonie) Nathan. On December 11, 1971, the eight-member Committee to Organize a Libertarian Party voted to formally launch the new Libertarian Party in the home of Luke Zell in Colorado Springs. The committee was immediately dissolved and replaced by the Steering Committee, which had its first meeting immediately after, which in turn was superseded by the National Executive Committee with the first national convention in 1972.

A press conference announcing the new party was held on January 31, 1972, at the party's headquarters in Westminster, Colorado. The first Libertarian National Convention, attracting 89 delegates from 23 states, was held in June 1978 in Denver. According to Ron Crickenberger, former Political Director of the LP, a search of LP documents showed that the LP had elected Miguel Gilson-De Lemos in a partisan local board race in New York even before the adoption of its first platform. Several others were also elected or appointed that year. Party leaders initially doubted they would even see six people elected or appointed by 2001, so this led to early optimism among some. However, in subsequent years the number of people in office seemed to be about 1% of its donor base: approximately 30 officeholders with 3,000 donors in 1981; 100 in office and 10,000 donors in 1991; and 600 and 60,000 in 2001.

Early platform debates included at the second convention whether to support tax resistance and at the 1974 convention whether to support anarchism. In both cases, a compromise was reached, neither supporting nor denouncing either view. The Libertarian Party's Statement of Principles was written by John Hospers, later to run as Libertarian nominee for President.

=== Subsequent history ===
In 1971, seventy-five percent of members supported running a presidential ticket and sixty percent supported running candidates for lower offices. Members of the party supported giving its presidential nomination to Murray Rothbard, Alan Greenspan, Vivien Kellems, A. Ernest Fitzgerald, Martin Anderson, Phil Crane, Robert A. Heinlein, H. R. Gross, Milton Friedman, Sam Ervin, Henry Manne, or Karl Hess. The party's name was selected by a vote of 111 to 87 in favor. John Hospers won the presidential nomination for the 1972 presidential election against James Bryan and Tonie Nathan defeated Diana Amsden for the vice-presidential nomination.

By the 1972 presidential election, the party had grown to over 80 members and had attained ballot access in two states. Their presidential ticket with John Hospers for President and Tonie Nathan for Vice President, received between 3,000 and 4,000 votes. The ticket received the first and only electoral college vote for a Libertarian presidential ticket, from Roger MacBride of Virginia, who was pledged to Richard Nixon. His was also the first vote ever cast for a woman in the United States Electoral College. MacBride became the party's presidential nominee in the 1976 presidential election. The 1976 election established the Libertarian Party as the number 1 alternative political party in the United States, and it remains the most successful alternative political party since the end of the Second World War.

In 1978, Dick Randolph became the first Libertarian to win state-level office with his election to the Alaska House of Representatives. Two years later, he won another term and Ken Fanning was also elected as a Libertarian to that chamber.

== 1980s ==
In the 1980 presidential contest, the Libertarian Party gained ballot access in all 50 states, Washington, D.C., and Guam, the first time a third party accomplished this since the Socialist Party in 1916 (when there were only 48 states and the District of Columbia did not get to vote for president). The ticket of Ed Clark and David H. Koch spent several million dollars on this political campaign and earned more than one percent of the popular vote with almost one million votes.

The party ran more candidates for seats in the United States House of Representatives than any other minor party since the 1980 elections.

The Massachusetts Libertarian Party was one of the few organizations to support a 1980s campaign to repeal prostitution laws.

On December 29, 1981, the first widely reported successful election in the continental United States of a Libertarian Party candidate in a partisan race occurred as Richard P. Siano, a Boeing 707 pilot for Trans World Airlines, running against both a Republican and a Democrat, was elected to the office of Kingwood Township Committeeman in western Hunterdon County, New Jersey. His election resulted from the special election held on December 29, 1981, to break a tie vote in the general election between him and the Democratic candidate. He received 63% of the votes cast in the special election. He served a three-year term of office.

In 1984, the party's presidential nominee, David Bergland, gained access to the ballot in 36 states and earned one-quarter of one percent of the popular vote. In 1987, Doug Anderson became the first Libertarian elected to office in a major city, elected to the Denver Election Commission (later, in 2005, Anderson was elected to the Lakewood, Colorado city council).

Norma Jean Almodovar, a former officer with the Los Angeles Police Department and former call girl who authored the book From Cop to Call Girl about her experiences, ran on the Libertarian Party ticket for California lieutenant governor in 1986 and was actively supported by the party. Mark Hinkle described her as being the most able "of any Libertarian" "to generate publicity".

In 1988, former Republican Congressman Ron Paul won the Libertarian nomination for president and was on the ballot in 46 states. Paul later successfully ran for United States House of Representatives from Texas, once again as a Republican, and held that office until 2013. He ran in the Republican primaries in 2008 and sponsored HR 1207 in the House of Representatives, a bill to audit the Federal Reserve. His running mate was Andre Marrou, a former member of the Alaska legislature; the ticket was thus one of the few "third-party" tickets in American history to have former office-holders in both slots.

== 1990s ==
In 1992, Andre Marrou, a Libertarian elected to the Alaska state legislature and Ron Paul's running mate in 1988, led the ticket, with attorney Nancy Lord as his vice presidential (VP) running mate. For the first time since the Clark campaign in 1980, the Libertarian Party's presidential ticket made the ballot in all 50 states, DC, and Guam usually as independent candidates without party labelling. In 1994, radio personality Howard Stern embarked on a political campaign for Governor of New York, formally announcing his candidacy under the Libertarian Party ticket. Although he legally qualified for the office and campaigned for a time after his nomination, many viewed the run for office as nothing more than a publicity stunt. He subsequently withdrew his candidacy because he did not want to comply with the financial disclosure requirements for candidates.

Investment adviser Harry Browne headed the 1996 and 2000 presidential tickets. The VP candidate in 1996 was South Carolina entrepreneur Jo Jorgensen; in 2000, Art Olivier of California was Browne's running mate. In 1996 the Party's presidential candidate again made the ballot in all 50 states, often as an independent without Libertarian labelling Washington, D.C. and Guam. The party's presidential ticket again made the ballot in 49 states, D.C. and Guam in 2000, mostly without party labelling. Although the LP has had ballot access with party labelling in some states for an election or for a time, the LP has never had ballot access with party labelling in all fifty states.

== 2000s ==
In 2000, the Arizona Libertarian Party, which had been disaffiliated from the national organization in late 1999, but which controlled the Libertarian ballot line in that state, nominated science fiction author L. Neil Smith and newspaperman Vin Suprynowicz, rather than Browne and Olivier, as its presidential slate. Smith and Suprynowicz polled 5,775 votes (0.4%) in Arizona.

=== 2004–2007 ===
In the 2004 election cycle, the Libertarian Party's presidential nomination race was the closest to date. Three candidates came within two percent of each other on the first two ballots at the 2004 national convention in Atlanta: Gun-rights activist and software engineer Michael Badnarik, talk radio host Gary Nolan, and Hollywood producer Aaron Russo. Badnarik was chosen as the party's presidential nominee on the third ballot after Nolan was eliminated, a comeback many saw as surprising, as Badnarik had not been viewed as a front-runner for the nomination – many delegates were won over during the convention itself, due to Badnarik's perceived strong performance in a formal candidate debate. The Badnarik campaign secured ballot status in 48 states (plus D.C. and Guam) and earned 397,265 votes. Despite less name recognition and a much smaller campaign checkbook, Badnarik polled nearly as well as independent candidate Ralph Nader. The Libertarian party also garnered more votes than the Green Party that year. His running mate was Richard Campagna who secured the vice presidential nod at the party's Atlanta convention with a landslide victory.

In the November 2006 mid-term election, the median vote percentage for Libertarians who ran for US House (excluding races with only one major party nominee) was 2.0%; while the median percentage for Greens who ran for that office (again excluding races with only one major party nominee) was 1.4%. Over 13,400,000 votes were cast for Libertarian Party candidates in 2006. In the 2007 general elections, Libertarian Party candidates won 14 elective offices, including an election for mayor of Avis, Pennsylvania.

=== 2004-2008 platform revision ===
In 1999, a working group of leading Libertarian Party activists proposed to reformat and retire the platform to serve as a guide for legislative projects (its main purpose to that point) and create a series of custom platforms on issues for different purposes, including the needs of the growing number of Libertarians in office. The proposal was incorporated in a new party-wide strategic plan and a joint platform-program committee proposed a reformatted project platform that isolated talking points on issues, principles and solutions as well as an array of projects for adaptation. This platform, along with a short Summary for talking points, was approved in 2004. Confusion arose when prior to the 2006 convention there was a push to repeal or substantially rewrite the Platform, at the center of which were groups such as the Libertarian Reform Caucus. Their agenda was partially successful in that the platform was much shortened (going from 61 to 15 planks—11 new planks and 4 retained from the old platform) over the previous one.

Members differ as to the reasons why the changes were relatively more drastic than any platform actions at previous conventions. Some delegates voted for changes so the party could appeal to a wider audience, while others simply thought the entire document needed an overhaul. It was also pointed out that the text of the existing platform was not provided to the delegates, making many reluctant to vote to retain the planks when the existing language was not provided for review.

Not all party members approved of the changes, some believing them to be a setback to libertarianism and an abandonment of what they see as the foremost purpose of the Libertarian Party.

At the 2008 Libertarian National Convention, the changes went even further with the approval of an entirely revamped platform. Much of the new platform recycles language from pre-millennial platforms. While the planks were renamed, most address ideas are found in earlier platforms and run no longer than three to four sentences.

=== 2006 convention ===
Between February 1, 2006, and the close of the 2006 Libertarian party convention on May 31, 2006, dues were set to $0. The latter was controversial and de facto reversed by the 2006 Libertarian National Convention in Portland, Oregon, at which the members re-established a basic dues category at $25 and further added a requirement that all National Committee officers must henceforth be at least sustaining members, which was not required prior to the convention.

==== Dallas Accord ====
The Dallas Accord is an implicit agreement that was made at the 1974 Libertarian National Convention as a compromise between the party's larger minarchist and smaller anarcho-capitalist factions by adopting a platform that explicitly did not say whether it was desirable for the state to exist.

The purpose of this agreement was to make the Libertarian Party a "big tent" that would welcome more ideologically diverse groups of people interested in reducing the size and scope of government. Consequently, the 1974 platform included a "Statement of Principles" which focused on statements arguing for getting government out of various activities, and used phrases such as "where governments exist they must not violate the rights of any individual." The previous version of the Statement of Principles adopted at the party's first convention in 1972, in contrast, affirmatively endorsed the minarchist perspective with statements such as "Since government has only one legitimate function, the protection of individual rights...." It was agreed that the topic of anarchism would not even be on the table for discussion until a limited government was achieved.

During the 2006 Libertarian National Convention, delegates deleted a large portion of the very detailed platform. The phrase "Government exists to protect the rights of every individual including life, liberty and property" was added. This development was described as the "Portland Massacre" by its opponents. Some took this as meaning the Dallas Accord was dead. Confusion resulted in the 2000s on whether the Dallas Accord remained in effect, and if so whether it should, or what limits it places on the party's public statements or candidates.

=== 2008 Bob Barr campaign ===
Several candidates sought to become the party's 2008 presidential nominee. Ron Paul, who had been the party's 1988 nominee and was seeking the 2008 Presidential nomination of the Republican Party, was mentioned as a possible nominee as well, but he officially denied any intent to run under a third-party banner. On December 12, 2007, the Party adopted a resolution requesting Paul to run on the Libertarian ticket if he did not win the Republican Party nomination. On March 25, 2008, Mike Gravel changed from the Democratic Party to the Libertarian Party. On May 12, 2008, ten days before the 2008 Libertarian National Convention, Bob Barr, a former employee for then CIA Director George W. Bush and later a Republican U.S. Congressman, announced that he would seek the nomination.

At the time of the 2008 Libertarian National Convention there were eight candidates for consideration at the convention: Bob Barr, Mike Gravel, Mike Jingozian, Steve Kubby, George Phillies, Wayne Allyn Root, Mary Ruwart, and Christine Smith. On May 25, after six ballots, the Libertarian Party chose Barr as their official nominee for president, and Root as his running mate.

=== 2009–2012 ===
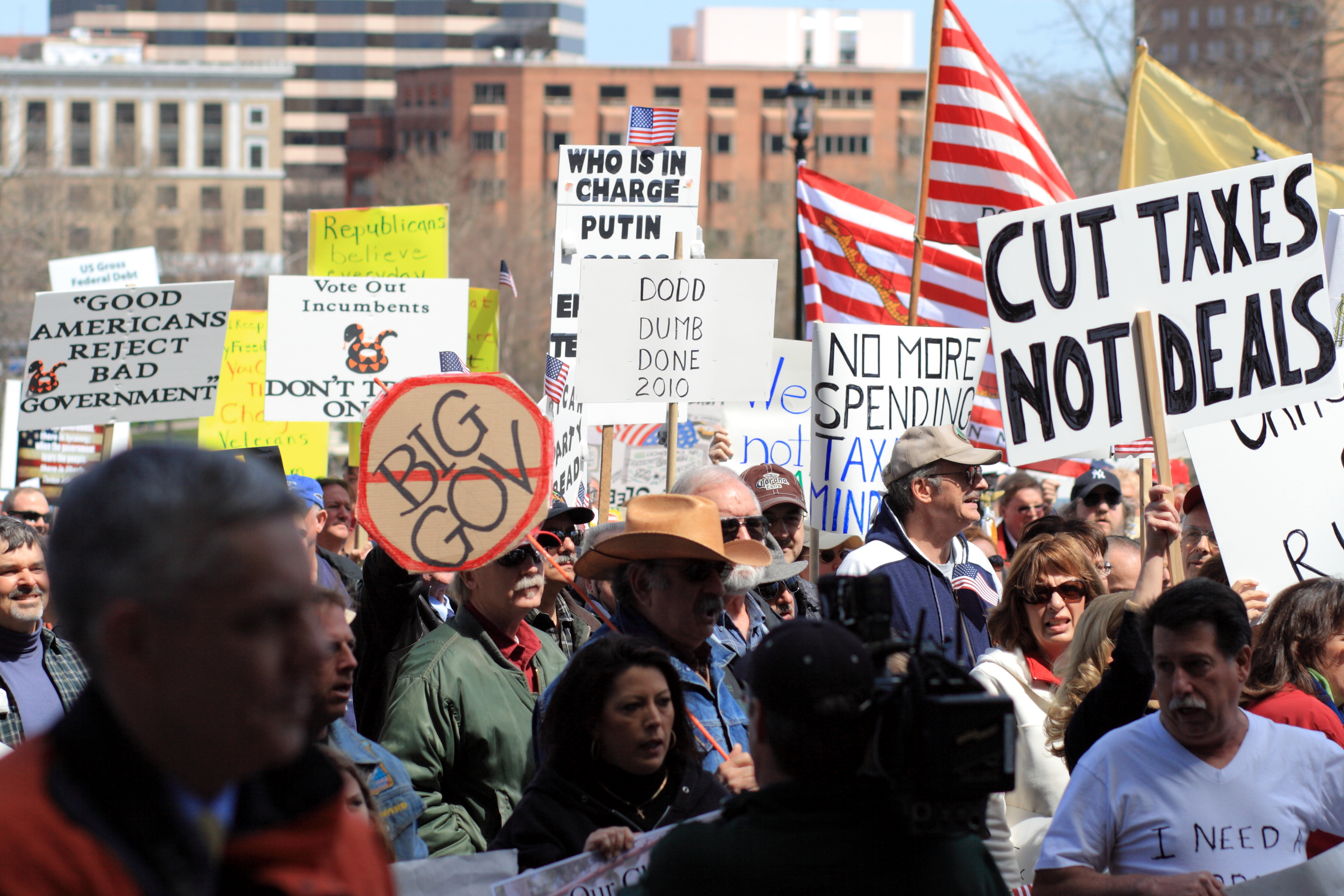
Many Libertarians credit the Tea Party movement for increasing their popularity in the 2010 and 2012 elections.

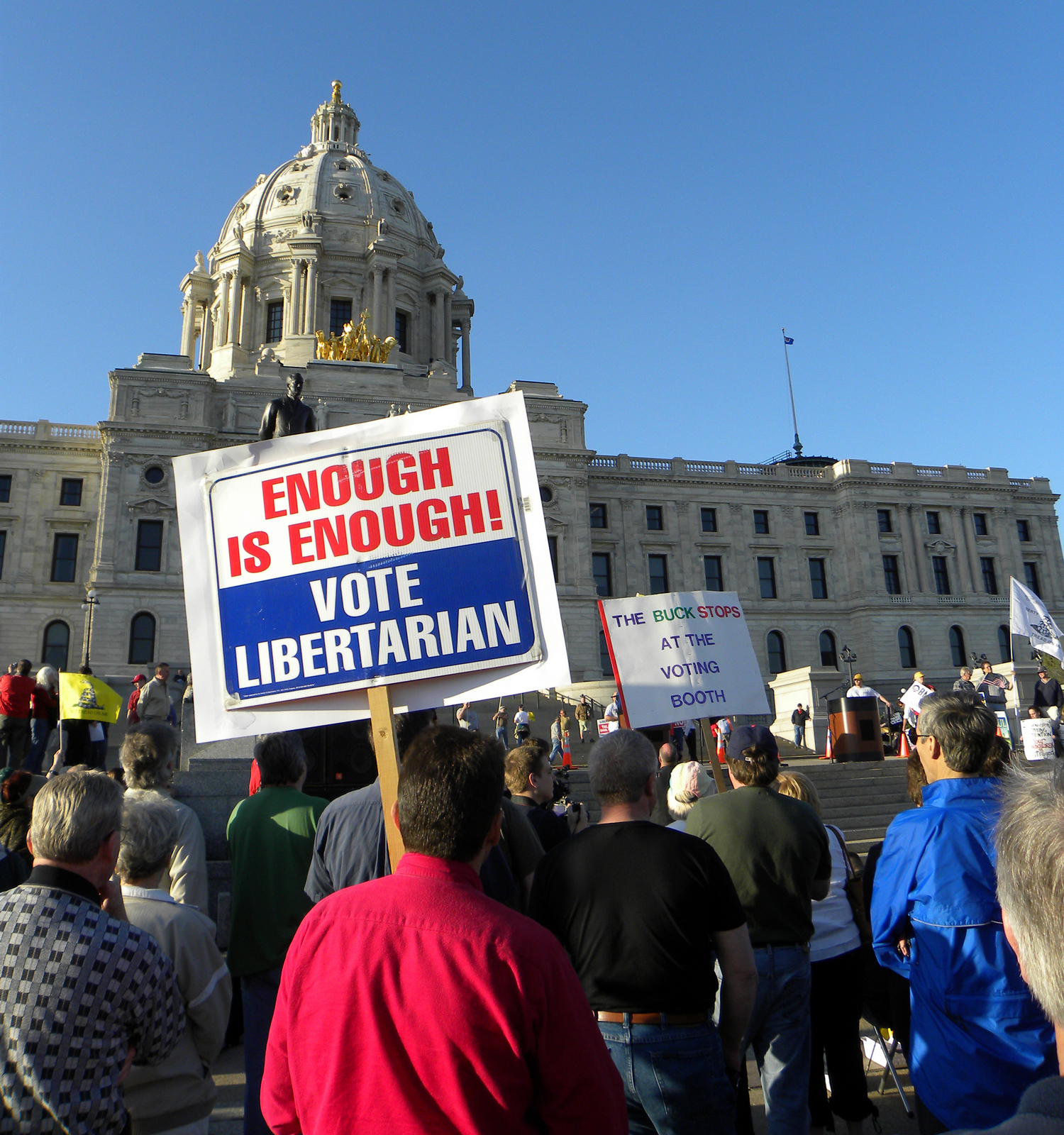
Libertarian protester at the 2010 Tea Party tax day, St. Paul, Minnesota

Protests caused by the Great Recession and the Affordable Care Act resulted in gains for both the Libertarian and Republican parties in the 2010 midterm elections. Calling themselves the Tea Party movement (based on the original Boston Tea Party), protesters desired a return to the government's constitutional limits, cuts in government spending and taxes, a Balanced Budget Amendment, and other economic policy reforms supported by the Libertarian Party. Though the Republicans successfully absorbed many voters from these protests as well, they would later lose popularity as the Libertarians continued to benefit into the 2012 elections and held on to much of the support they had lost in the mid-2000s.

In April 2012, the Libertarian Party of Nebraska successfully lobbied for a reform in ballot access with the new law requiring parties to requalify every four years instead of two. Following the 2012 election, the party gained automatic ballot status in 30 states.

In 2009, the Libertarian Party of Washington encouraged voters to approve Washington Referendum 71 that extended LGBT relationship rights. According to the party, withholding domestic partnership rights from same-sex couples is a violation of the Equal Protection Clause of the Constitution. In September 2010, the Libertarian Party urged gay Democratic voters to switch their vote to Libertarian, given that the Obama administration had not yet repealed the "Don't Ask, Don't Tell" policy (which banned openly gay people from serving in the military). Obama signed the repeal the following December.

The Libertarian Party opposed the 2011 military intervention in Libya and LP Chair Mark Hinkle in a statement described the position of the Libertarian Party: "President Obama's decision to order military attacks on Libya is only surprising to those who actually think he deserved the Nobel Peace Prize. He has now ordered bombing strikes in six different countries, adding Libya to Afghanistan, Iraq, Pakistan, Somalia, and Yemen."

== 2010s ==
=== 2012 Gary Johnson campaign ===
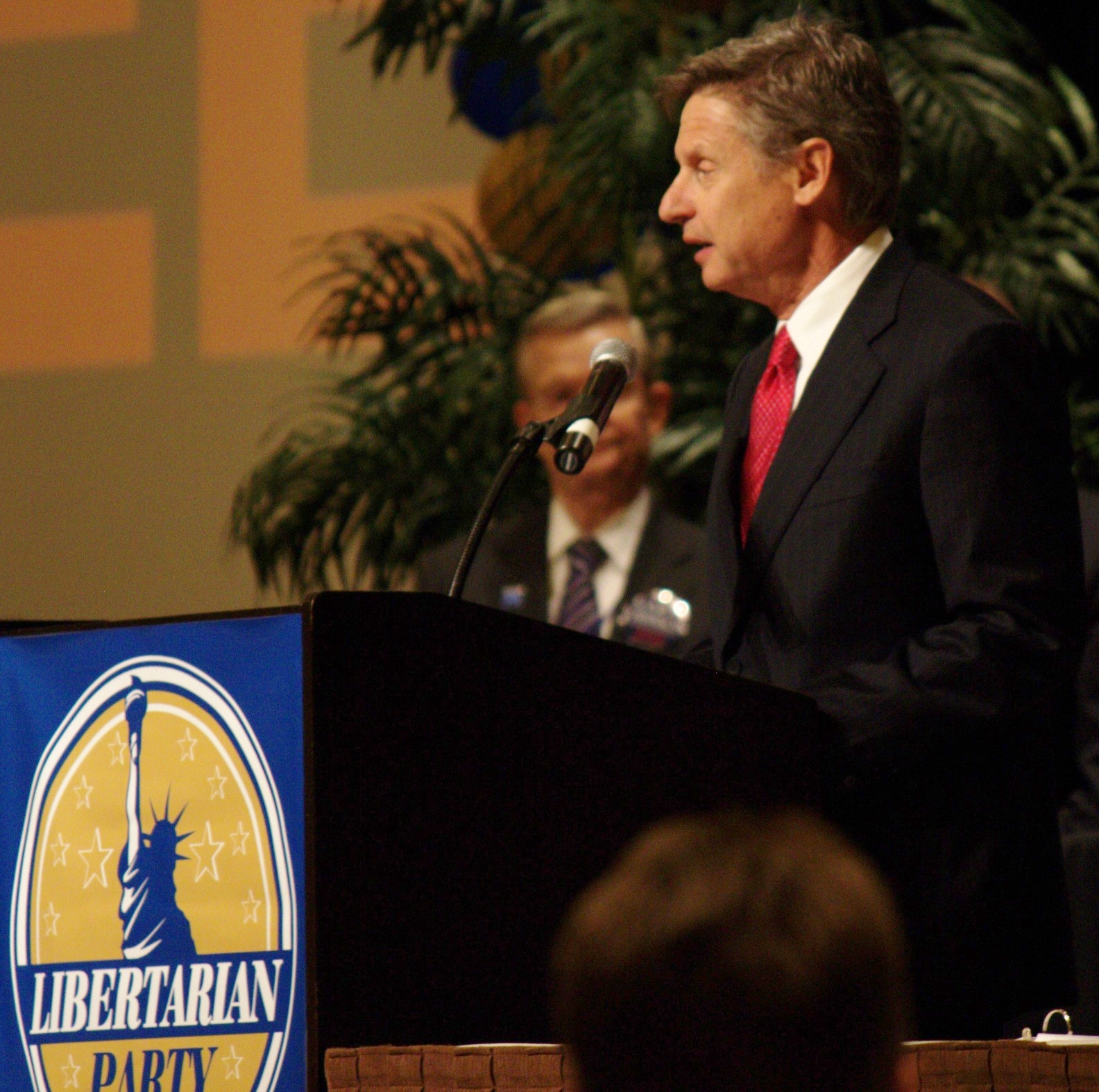
Gary Johnson during the presidential nomination debate at Libertarian Party convention

After initially running for the Republican nomination, former Governor of New Mexico Gary Johnson announced his intention to seek that of the Libertarians. Johnson is known for his opposition to United States involvement in the Afghanistan, Iraq and Libyan wars and as a fiscal conservative who supports "slashing government spending". As governor, he cut taxes fourteen times and slashed the 10% annual growth in the New Mexican budget using his gubernatorial veto. He won the nomination over Virginian Bill Still and Texan R. Lee Wrights. He came in third in the general election, receiving 1,275,821 popular votes (1.0%), the most votes of any Libertarian Party presidential candidate at the time.

=== 2016 Gary Johnson campaign ===
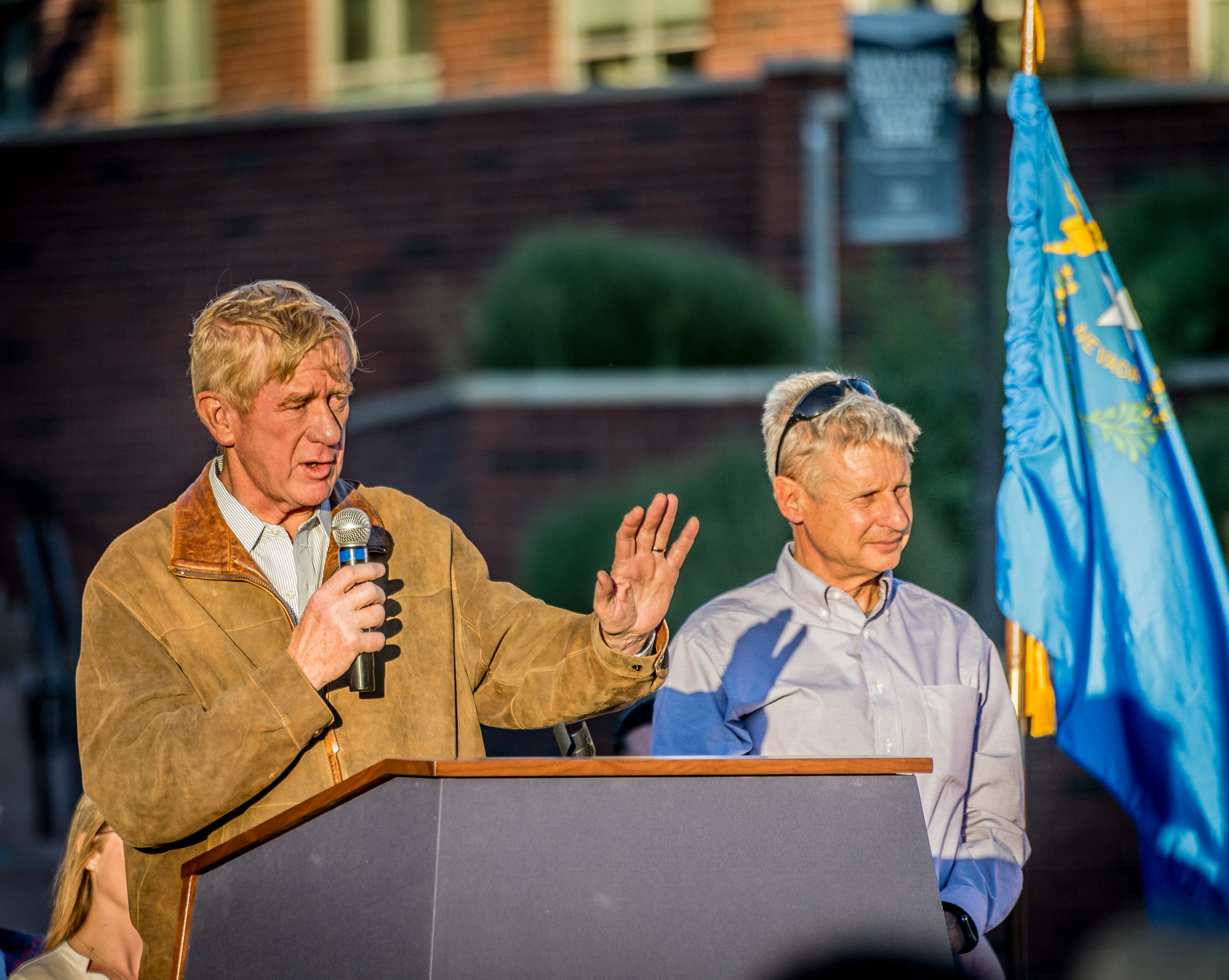
William Weld and Gary Johnson at a rally in Reno, Nevada, August 2016

Gary Johnson's performance in the 2016 election shown by county, with darker shades indicating stronger support

At the Libertarian Party National Convention held in Orlando, Florida, on May 26–30, 2016, former Governor of New Mexico Gary Johnson became the Libertarian Party candidate for president. His running mate was former Governor of Massachusetts Bill Weld. They were on the ballot in all 50 states, including D.C.

A Monmouth University opinion poll conducted on March 24, 2016, found Libertarian candidate Gary Johnson polling in double digits with 11% in a three-way race against Donald Trump (34%) and Hillary Clinton (42%). Later, a CNN poll from July 16, 2016, found Johnson with a personal best 13% of the vote. To be included in any of the three main presidential debates, a candidate must be polling at least 15% in national polls.

Following Trump's win in the Indiana Republican primary, making him the presumptive Republican nominee, the Libertarian Party received a rise in attention. Between 7 p.m. on May 3 and Noon on May 4, the Libertarian Party received 99 new memberships and an increase in donors as well as a rise in Google searches of "Libertarian Party" and "Gary Johnson". On May 5, Mary Matalin, a longtime Republican political strategist, switched parties to become a registered Libertarian, expressing her dislike of Trump.

Several Republican elected officials publicly stated that were considering voting for the Libertarian Party ticket in 2016. That included 2012 Republican presidential nominee Mitt Romney. It had been a common question and concern that the Libertarian ticket would exclusively draw away votes from Donald Trump and not the Democratic ticket. In response, Libertarian 2016 nominee Gary Johnson noted that analysis of national polls shows more votes drawn from Hillary Clinton. Johnson's supporters heavily skewed young, with 70% of them being under 50, and many of them Republican-leaning and holding a bachelor's degree or higher; however, he was deeply unpopular with very conservative voters. Johnson was particularly popular in Johnson's home state of New Mexico, earning 9.3% of the vote.

Johnson's campaign is best remembered for his gaffe on September 8, on MSNBC's Morning Joe, he was asked by panelist Mike Barnicle, "What would you do, if you were elected, about Aleppo?" (referring to the war-torn city of Aleppo in Syria). Johnson responded, "And what is Aleppo?" When an "incredulous" Barnicle said "You're kidding... Aleppo is in Syria – it's the epicenter of the refugee crisis," Johnson responded by saying that "the only way that we deal with Syria is to join hands with Russia to diplomatically bring that at an end." The gaffe seriously damaged Johnson's credibility in the eyes of the average voter, seeing his polling steeply drop from its peak of 13% of the national electorate.

Johnson would go on to receive 4,489,233 total votes (3.3% of the nationwide popular vote), with his best performance (9.3%) coming in New Mexico, where he previously served as a two-term governor. Johnson is the most popular Libertarian candidate in US history.

Following the 2016 election, the party announced that it had achieved automatic ballot status in 37 or 38 states and the District of Columbia.

After the conclusion of the Electoral College in 2016, the Libertarian Party received one electoral college vote from a faithless elector in Texas. The party's 2016 nominee Gary Johnson did not receive the vote. The single faithless vote went instead to former Republican Congressman Ron Paul, who had rejoined the Libertarian Party in 2015. He is the first Libertarian to receive an electoral vote since John Hospers in 1972.

=== 2016-17 Donald Trump defection wave ===
After presidential candidate Donald Trump won Indiana's 2016 Republican primary, several Republican officeholders left the Party and changed their affiliation to the Libertarian Party. In January 2016, the first to do so was Nevada Assembly member John Moore switched to Libertarian Moore was censured by the Libertarian Party after he supported of taxpayer subsidies to build a stadium. Moore was defeated for re-election in 2016. In May 2016, nonpartisan Nebraska Legislature member Laura Ebke announced her displeasure with the Republican Party and announced she was registering as a Libertarian in May 2016. Ebke switched after the state legislative session and did not run for re-election. In July, Utah State Senate member Mark B. Madsen switched to Libertarian. In the 2016 election cycle, Madsen Madsen did not seek re-election. In May 2016, New Hampshire House member Max Abramson switched from Republican to Libertarian before running as the party's gubernatorial candidate instead of seeking re-election.

From February to June 2017, three New Hampshire House of Representatives members left the Republican or Democratic party and joined the Libertarian Party. Caleb Q. Dyer switched from Republican to Libertarian in February 2017, Joseph Stallcop from Democratic in May 2017, and Brandon Phinney from Republican in June 2017. The 2016 and 2017 defection waves each brought the Libertarian Party to its highest number of state legislature officials since 1992.

== 2020s ==
=== 2020 Jo Jorgensen campaign ===
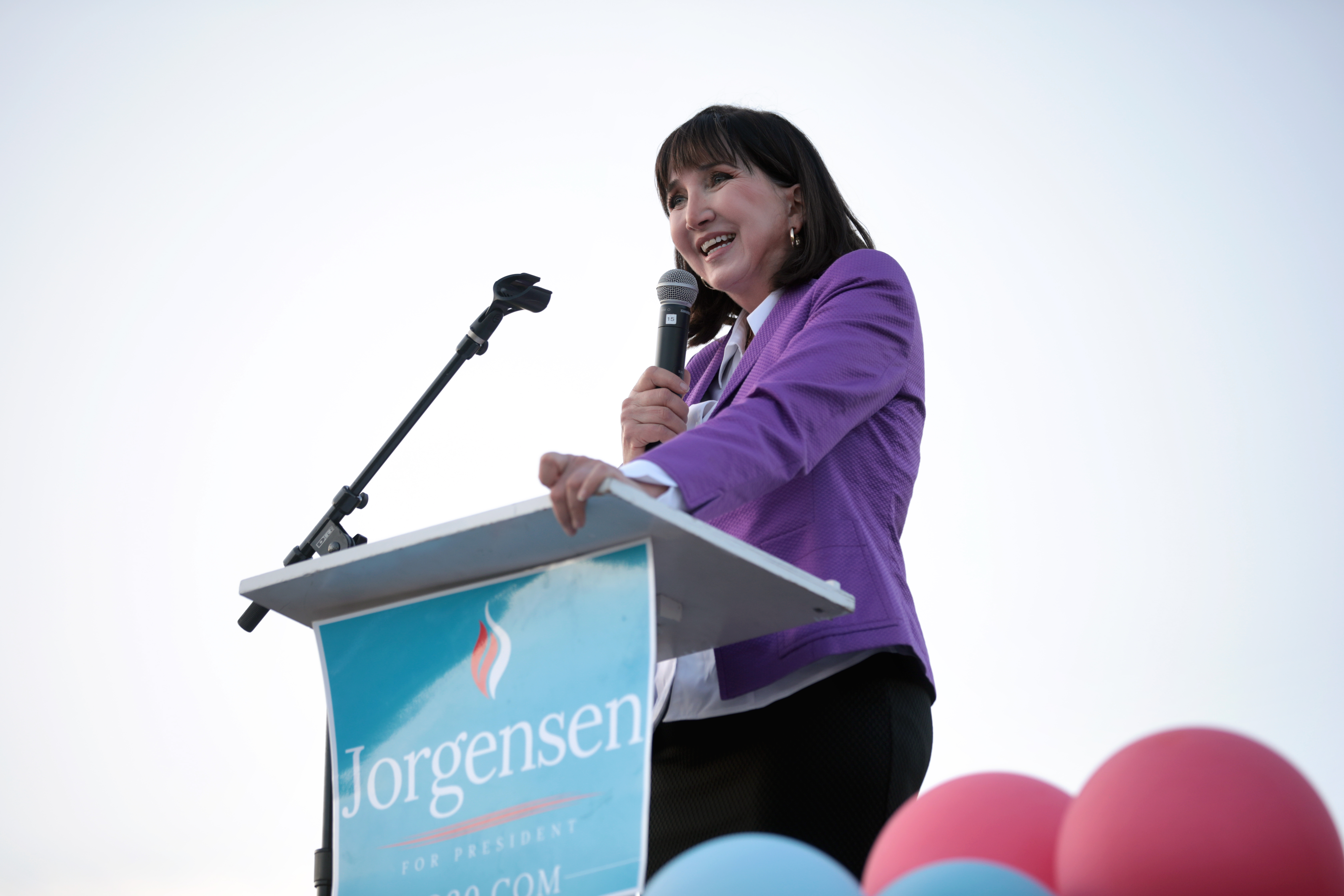
Jorgensen speaking at a rally in Scottsdale, Arizona, October 10, 2020

At the Libertarian Party National Convention held from May 22 to May 24 online due to the COVID-19 pandemic, activist and academic Jo Jorgensen became the Libertarian Party candidate for president, the first woman to do so. Jorgensen defeated Jacob Hornberger and Vermin Supreme after four rounds of balloting, with activist and podcaster Spike Cohen winning the vice-presidential candidacy in three rounds beating John Monds despite Jorgensen voicing support for Monds. Jorgensen and Cohen achieved ballot access in all 50 states and the District of Columbia on September 15, 2020. The pair received 1,865,535 total votes and 1.2% of the national vote, coming third in the nation, marking the second highest results for a Libertarian presidential candidate, but nearly half the total that Johnson had earned the previous cycle.

=== 2020-2024 Biden era ===
On February 7, 2023, the Libertarian Party endorsed the "Rage Against the War Machine" rally in Washington, D.C. and denounced American aid to Ukraine.

=== 2024 Chase Oliver campaign ===
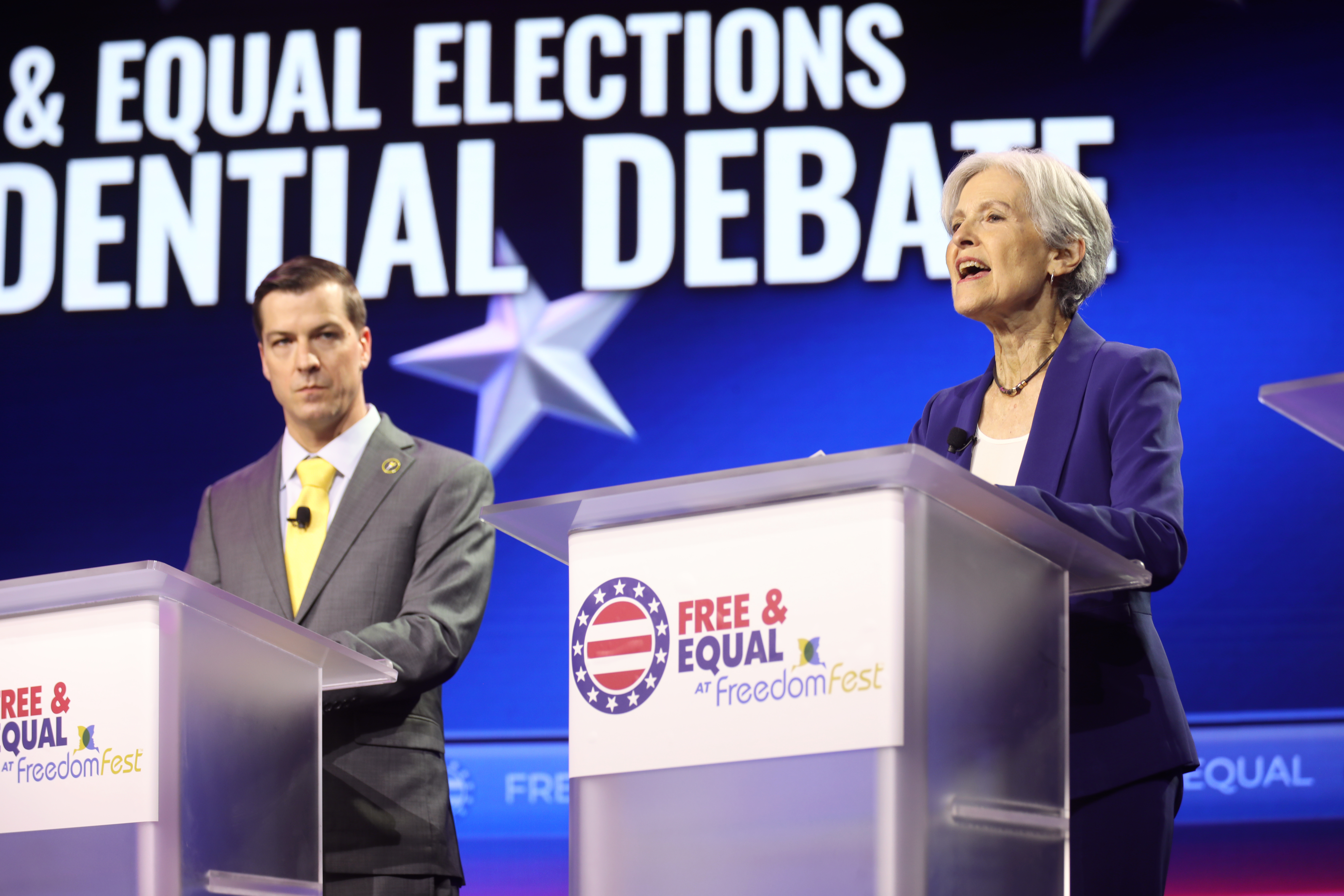
Chase Oliver (left) debating Green Party candidate Jill Stein at the 2024 FreedomFest

At the Libertarian National Convention held from May 24 to May 27 in Washington D.C. candidate for the 2022 Georgia Senate election, Chase Oliver, became the party's candidate for president, defeating the Mises Caucaus backed Michael Rectenwald after seven ballots. Oliver voiced support for another candidate, Mike ter Maat, to be his running mate, who would be nominated after just two ballots.

In May 2024, Donald Trump spoke at the Libertarian Party's convention in Washington D.C. with his speech focusing on libertarian issues such as his stances on anti-war policies, Bitcoin, and First and Second Amendment rights. This was the first time a current or former U.S. president had spoken at a Libertarian Party convention.

Party Chairwoman Angela McArdle stated that she endorsed Oliver as a vehicle for Donald Trump's victory, claiming Oliver would "pull two to one from Biden, as opposed to Trump." However, The New York Times reported in October 2024 that Democratic-linked dark money groups were funding ads promoting Oliver, with the goal of eating into Donald Trump's vote share.

Four state Libertarian parties, in Colorado, Montana, New Hampshire, and Idaho, publicly "denounced" Oliver's nomination. In July 2024, it was announced the Libertarian Party of Colorado would place Robert F. Kennedy Jr. as its presidential nominee, rather than Oliver, however, the party had already submitted the paperwork for Oliver to be named the candidate. Additionally, McArdle and the national party attempted to form a "joint fundraiser" with Robert F. Kennedy Jr. which was heavily contested by the Party's National Secretary Caryn Ann Harlos, who opened an internal investigation by the party's judicial committee, arguing that McArdle was sabotaging the party's candidate and violated party by-laws. The judicial committee found that McArdle hadn't violated any by-laws, but that the "joint fundraiser" was improper, and must be withdrawn from immediately.

Oliver and ter Maat earned 637,251 votes, or 0.42% of the electorate, falling behind Kennedy who got 0.48% despite dropping out, and behind the Green Party's Jill Stein who got 0.50%. This is the first time the Green party outperformed the Libertarians since Ralph Nader's 2000 bid for President.

=== 2020s internal disputes ===
In 2022, the paleolibertarian Mises Caucus (LPMC) became the dominant faction on the Libertarian National Committee, leading to internal conflicts and significant policy changes, specifically regarding immigration and abortion. Some classical liberalism-minded dissidents split from the Libertarian Party to form the Liberal Party USA, while others formed the Classical Liberal Caucus. (Note: Now Liberal Party USA)

At the 2022 Libertarian National Convention, members of the Mises Caucus, a paleolibertarian group affiliated with the beliefs of Ron Paul successfully staged a takeover of the Party, with over two-thirds of delegates becoming members of the Caucus, shifting the party in a right-ward direction. The caucus successfully swept leadership positions, including electing Angela McArdle as chairwomen and Joshua Smith as vice-chairman. The 2022 convention had an unusually high number of delegates, with the last recorded number for an off-election year convention in 2006 being just 300 delegates. The 2022 convention by contrast saw over 1,000 delegates. After the takeover, non-Mises affiliated members walked out, criticizing the group for lacking in libertarian orthodoxy, as well as condemning several racist statements that members of the Caucus had made in the past. More ardent members of the party started to splinter, with Pennsylvania's split resulting in the formation of the Keystone Party of Pennsylvania and Virginia's resulting in the formation of the Liberty Party of Virginia.

Following changes to the party's official core platform by new leadership, several other state-level affiliated parties disaffiliated from the national Party or dissolved themselves. The New Mexico Libertarian Party further argued the Mises Caucus sweep was illegal, citing bylaws which was later amended. After the Libertarian Party of Virginia reformed, the dissidents formed a splinter group, the Virginia Classical Liberal Party. A similar situation occurred regarding the Libertarian Party of Massachusetts with that state's party resisting a Mises takeover and disaffiliated at the national level resulting in the national Libertarian Party recognizing alternate leadership, although, they had to form a new party. The Mises Caucus furthermore blocked the disaffiliation of the New Hampshire party.

The Association of Liberty State Parties was officially formed on December 3, 2022 as a national party committee between the Massachusetts and New Mexico, and the Liberty Party of Virginia. The Association formally rebranded to Liberal Party USA in February 2024.

In late 2023, Party Chair Angela McArdle, after being contacted by former acting director of national intelligence Richard Grenell, met with Donald Trump to consult on how Trump could win over the Libertarian vote. McArdle suggested the pardon of Ross Ulbricht, who was sentenced to life in prison in 2015 for his role in the marketplace Silk Road, which was achieved after the inauguration of Donald Trump. Five months later, Donald Trump was invited to the Libertarian Party's 2024 National Convention by McArdle, where he promised to include a libertarian in the cabinet and stated that the Libertarians should make him the presidential nominee. Trump was booed and heckled, including cries of "Bullshit!" and "Fuck you!". His announcement to free Ross Ulbricht, however, received a standing ovation. Subsequently, the convention nominated "armed and gay" former senate candidate Chase Oliver for president, who defeated paleolibertarian Michael Rectenwald. Oliver's nomination was denounced by the state affiliates in Montana, Colorado, New Hampshire, and Idaho.

Chair Angela McArdle, after claims of improper party fund spending directed at her partner, stepped down from her position as chair of the Libertarian Party National Committee in January 2025. Mises Caucus founder Michael Heise was defeated by Steven Nekhaila in a 9–6 vote, who promised commitments to a policy of emphasizing small local races. Six national committee members endorsed by the Mises Caucus defected to Nekhaila, cementing his victory. Classical Liberal Caucus member Paul Darr was elected as vice-chairman.

The Libertarian Party of New Hampshire was censured in September 2025 by the National Committee citing "despicable conduct", and was invited to disaffiliate and cease its use of the Libertarian Party name.

== Name and symbols ==
Original TANSTAAFL logo

In 1972, "Libertarian Party" was chosen as the party's name, selected over "New Liberty Party". The first official slogan of the Libertarian Party was "There ain't no such thing as a free lunch" (abbreviated "TANSTAAFL"), a phrase popularized by Robert A. Heinlein in his 1966 novel The Moon Is a Harsh Mistress, sometimes dubbed "a manifesto for a libertarian revolution". The slogan of the party has since become "The Party of Principle".

Also in 1972, the "Libersign"—an arrow angling upward through the abbreviation "TANSTAAFL"—was adopted as a party symbol. By the end of the decade, this was replaced with the Lady Liberty until 2015, with the adoption of the "Torch Eagle" logo.

In 1975 the Free Libertarian Party of New York choose the porcupine as their mascot. In the 1990s, other state Libertarian parties adopted the Liberty Penguin ("LP") as their official mascot. Over the next few decades the porcupine became the consensus animal mascot of the Libertarian Party.

== Presidential tickets ==
Libertarian presidential tickets

1972: John Hospers and Tonie Nathan – 3,674 popular votes (nil%); 1 electoral vote
1976: Roger MacBride and David Bergland – 172,553 popular votes (0.2%)
1980: Ed Clark and David Koch – 921,128 popular votes (1.1%)
1984: David Bergland and James A. Lewis – 228,111 popular votes (0.3%)
1988: Ron Paul and Andre Marrou – 431,750 popular votes (0.5%)
1992: Andre Marrou and Nancy Lord – 290,087 popular votes (0.3%)
1996: Harry Browne and Jo Jorgensen – 485,798 popular votes (0.5%)
2000: Harry Browne and Art Olivier – 384,516 popular votes (0.4%)
2004: Michael Badnarik and Richard Campagna – 397,265 popular votes (0.3%)
2008: Bob Barr and Wayne Allyn Root – 523,686 popular votes (0.4%)
2012: Gary Johnson and Jim Gray – 1,275,821 popular votes (1.0%)
2016: Gary Johnson and Bill Weld – 4,488,919 popular votes (3.3%)
2020: Jo Jorgensen and Spike Cohen – 1,865,724 popular votes (1.2%)
2024: Chase Oliver and Mike ter Maat – 650,142 popular votes (0.42%)

== See also ==
- Libertarian Party (United States)
- List of Libertarian Party politicians who have held office in the United States
- Electoral history of the Libertarian Party (United States)
