= 2025 Libertarian National Committee chair special election =

Political party leadership election in the United States

- February 2, 2025

15 members of the LNC who voted 8 votes needed to win
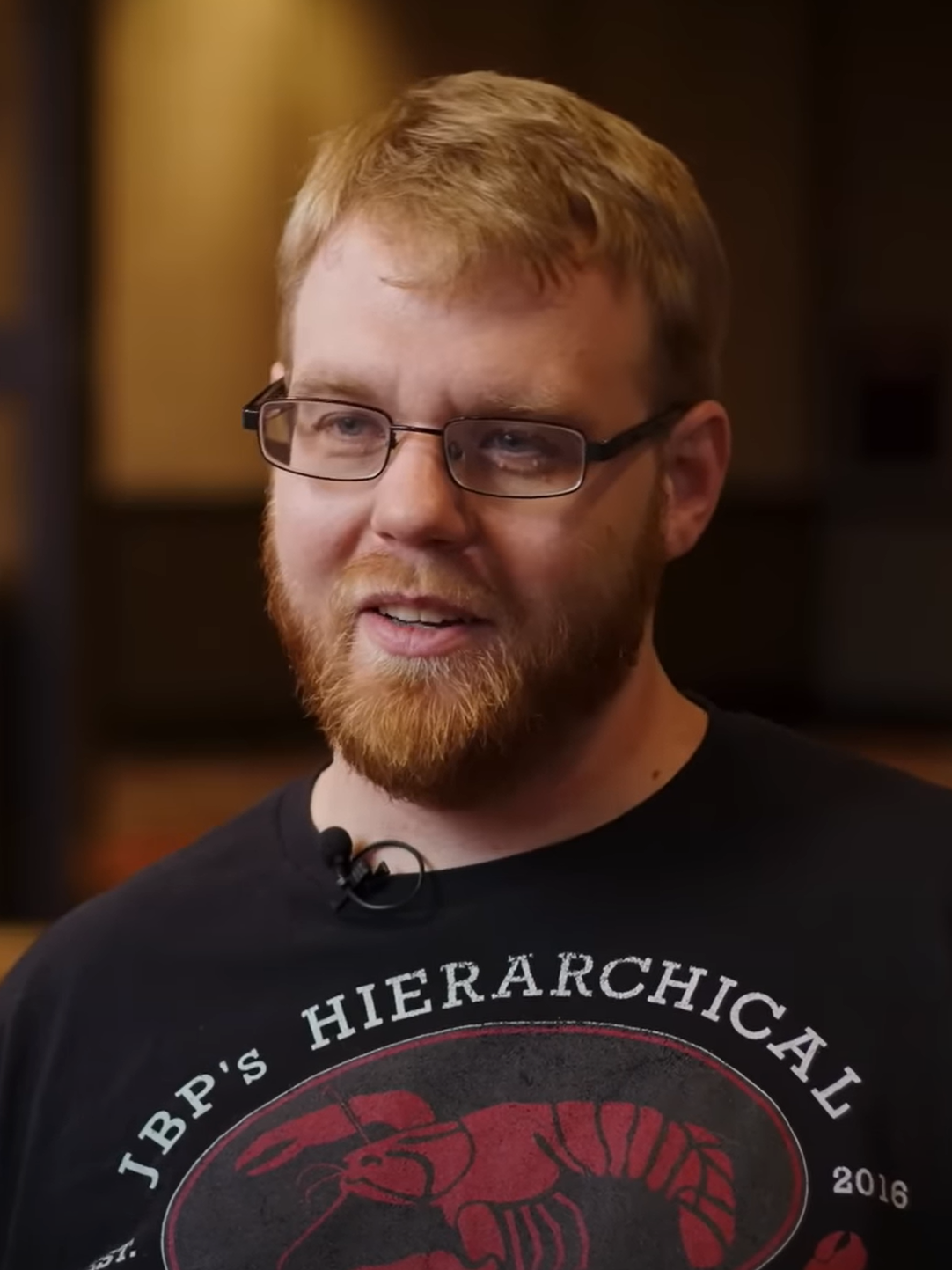
Candidate	Steven Nekhaila	Michael Heise
Vote	9	6
Percentage	60%	40%
Chair before election
Angela McArdle
Elected Chair
Steven Nekhaila

The 2025 Libertarian National Committee chair special election was held on February 2, 2025 by the Libertarian National Committee (LNC), the governing body of the United States Libertarian Party (LP), to elect their next chairperson, after their chair Angela McArdle announced her resignation on January 25, 2025.

On the evening of February 2, Steven Nekhaila of Florida was elected the new LNC Chair.

== Background ==
Angela McArdle was re-elected as LNC Chair at the 2024 Libertarian National Convention. She was first elected to the position in May 2022, as part of the "Mises Caucus takeover" of the Libertarian Party. The party had experienced a shift to the right under her first term as Chair.

In her second term, McArdle attracted controversies within the party over her actions as Chair after Donald Trump's appearance at the 2024 Libertarian convention. McArdle endorsed Libertarian nominee Chase Oliver in the 2024 United States presidential election as a vehicle for Trump's victory, although she had been accused by her critics of being disloyal to the Libertarian Party during a dispute over Oliver's ballot access in Colorado. McArdle also had been accused of being involved in self-interested transactions.

On January 21, 2025, new allegations emerged that McArdle did not disclose gifts made to her domestic partner from the Party's funds, which led to calls within the party for her resignation. On January 25, McArdle announced her intent to resign, citing new opportunities. She continued as chair until Steven Nekhaila was elected as her successor.

== Candidates ==
=== Declared ===
The following candidates decided to run, or had accepted a nomination during the election.

- Michael Heise, Founder and Chair of the Mises Caucus.
- Steven Nekhaila, LNC At-large member.
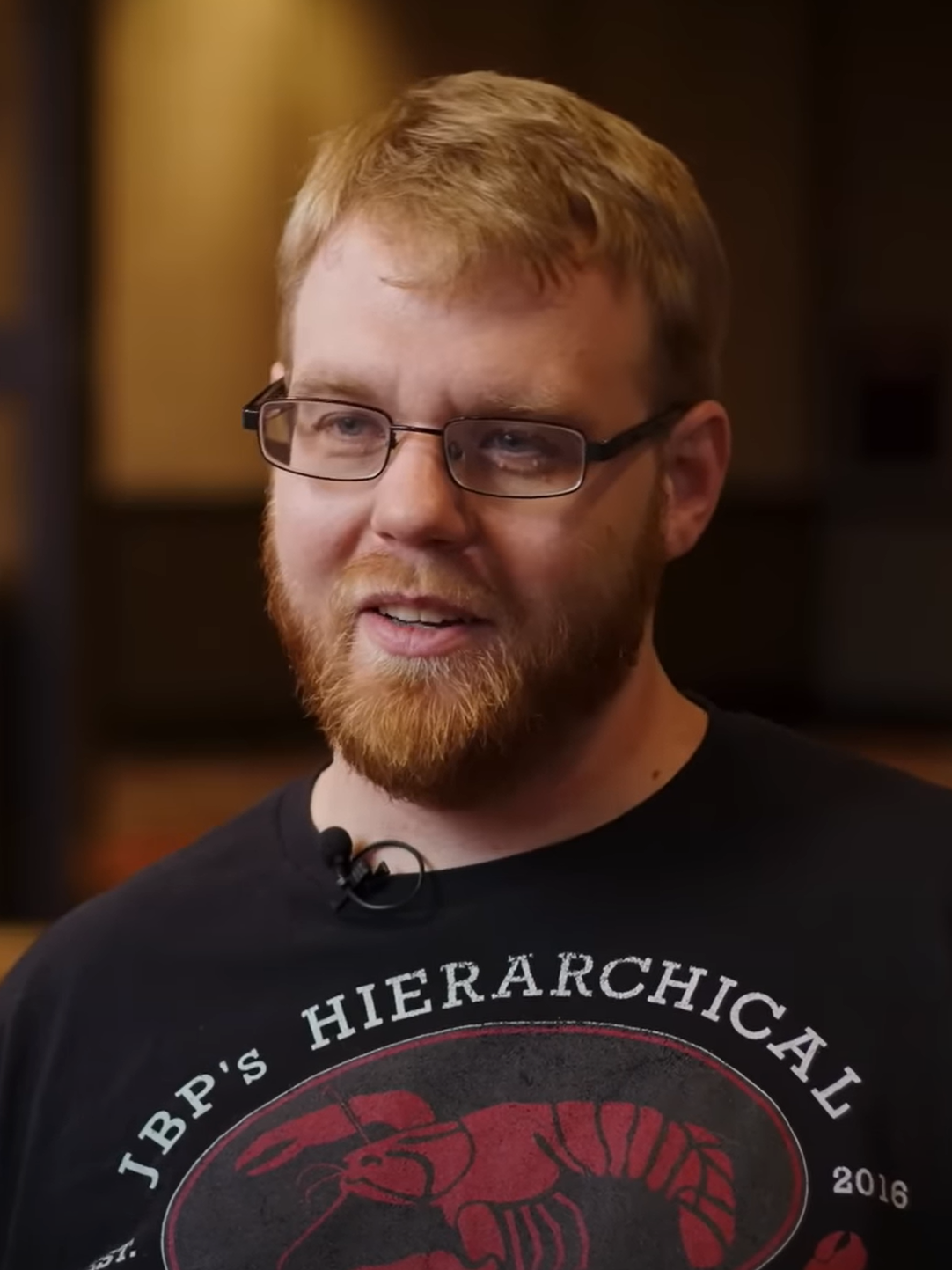
Mises Caucus founder
Michael Heise

=== Withdrawn consideration ===
The following candidates were previously publicly considering running, but have later decided not to accept any nominations.

- Justin Amash, former U.S. Representative from Michigan (2011–2021), and former Republican candidate for the U.S. Senate in Michigan in 2024.
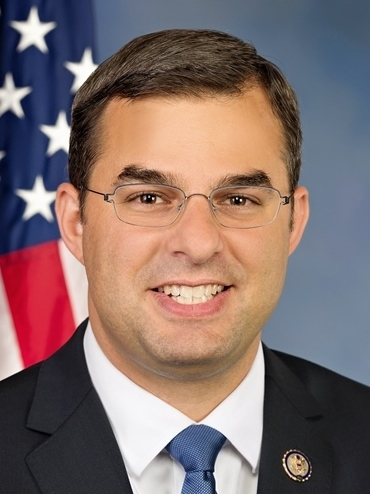
Former U.S. Representative
Justin Amash
(2011-2021)

=== Declined ===
- Chase Oliver, 2024 Libertarian nominee for US President.

== Endorsements ==
Michael Heise
- Dave Smith, comedian and libertarian activist
- Angela McArdle, outgoing LNC Chair
- Mises Caucus
Justin Amash
- Brittany Kosin, Founder of the Libertarian Medical Freedom Caucus, Candidate for LNC At-Large, and libertarian activist
- Nolan Schmidt, Political Columnist, former Candidate for LNC At-Large, and Libertarian Party of Texas SLEC District 21 Representative
- Libertarian Medical Freedom Caucus

== Results ==
Steven Nekhaila defeated Michael Heise by a vote of 9-6.

== Reactions ==
On February 2, the Libertarian Party of Colorado condemned the LNC for "the accelerated and opaque process" in selecting a new Chair.

== See also ==
- 2025 Democratic National Committee chairmanship election
- 2024 Republican National Committee leadership elections
- 2021 Libertarian National Committee chair special election
- Factions in the Libertarian Party (United States)
