= 2026 Libertarian National Convention =

Political event in the United States

Convention
- Dates: May 21–25, 2026
- City: Grand Rapids, Michigan
- Venue: DeVos Place Convention Center

The 2026 Libertarian National Convention were held from May 21 to May 25, 2026, in Grand Rapids, Michigan. It served as the biennial national convention of the Libertarian Party, at which delegates from state affiliates conducted party business and elected members of the Libertarian National Committee.

The convention took place at the Amway Grand Plaza in downtown Grand Rapids.

== Background ==
The Libertarian National Convention is held every two years and serves as the party's highest decision-making body. Delegates selected by state party affiliates vote on party leadership positions, consider amendments to party bylaws and platform language, and adopt resolutions.

The 2026 convention followed the 2024 Libertarian National Convention, which was held in Washington, D.C..

== Planning and organization ==
Grand Rapids was selected as the host city for the 2026 convention following a site selection process conducted by the Libertarian National Committee. Local party organizations and convention organizers coordinated planning efforts for hosting delegates and events.

Convention organizers announced the theme "Freedom Calls" following a party-wide theme contest.

Preparations for the convention have included coordination with local affiliates, fundraising efforts, and development of programming for delegates and attendees.

=== Dress code debate ===
On May 15, party activist Ben Weir took to twitter demanding a business casual dress-code for the convention which would block costumes that are "overtly theatrical, fetish-oriented, or materially inconsistent" which would enforce a policy that "Biological males shall not wear dresses, skirts, or attire traditionally recognized as women’s wear" and that "[Libertarians] cannot expect to get over 0.5% of the vote for our candidates if we don’t get better on our messaging." Weir, who has stood as a Libertarian perennial candidate and was at the time running for Merrimack County, New Hampshire sheriff, was met with significant criticism among Libertarian circles due to its apparent anti-transgender stance, but was supported by the national Libertarian Party. The proposal ultimately went to the national party board which deadlocked at 5-5 votes with chairman Steven Nekhaila, who would've been the tie-breaker, abstaining.

== Chair election ==
Incumbent chair Steven Nekhaila did not seek re-election. Evan McMahon was chosen as the new chair of the party.

=== Candidates ===
==== Declared ====
- Wes Benedict: former executive director of the Libertarian National Committee
- Evan McMahon: Chair of the Libertarian Party of Indiana
- Rob Yates: Candidate for the Charlotte mayoral elections in 2025 and 2013
- Jim Ostrowski: attorney, Libertarian activist
- Jeremy Kauffman, Chair of Libertarian Party of New Hampshire

==== Declined ====
- Steven Nekhaila: incumbent chair

==== Results ====
2026 Libertarian National Committee chair election
| Candidate | Round 1 | | Round 2 | | Round 3 | |
| Candidate | Votes | % | Votes | % | Votes | % |
|---|---|---|---|---|---|---|
| Evan McMahon | 187 | 31.6% | 241 | 40.0% | 320 | 53.5% |
| Jim Ostrowski | 195 | 32.9% | 236 | 39.1% | 265 | 44.3% |
| Wes Benedict | 125 | 21.1% | 110 | 18.2% | Eliminated | |
| Rob Yates | 42 | 7.1% | Eliminated | | | |
| Jeremy Kauffman | 31 | 5.2% | Eliminated | | | |
