= 2018 Libertarian National Convention =

Political event in the United States

- 2018 United States elections

Convention
- Dates: June 30–July 3, 2018
- City: New Orleans, Louisiana
- Venue: Hyatt Regency Hotel
- Chair: Daniel Hayes
- Keynote speaker: Amaryllis Fox

The 2018 Libertarian National Convention was held from June 30 to July 3, 2018, in New Orleans, Louisiana. According to the Libertarian Party, the 2018 convention was the "biggest Libertarian National Convention ever," breaking previous records in attendance and fundraising.

== Theme ==
The theme was "I'm THAT Libertarian!", a phrase uttered by the late Marc Allan Feldman in a Libertarian presidential debate at the 2016 national convention.

== Events ==
=== Chair election ===
Nicholas Sarwark's seat as Chair of the Libertarian National Committee (LNC) was up for election. Sarwark faced challenge from Washington LP member Joshua Smith, Libertarian Socialist Caucus member Matt Kuehnel, former Gary Johnson and John McAfee campaign staffer Christopher Thrasher and Libertarian Party of Carbon County Chair Matt Schutter. Sarwark ended up winning an unprecedented consecutive third-term as LNC chair.

==== Endorsements ====
Nicholas Sarwark

Individuals

- Phil Anderson, 2018 Libertarian candidate for Governor of Wisconsin
- Steve Dutner, 2018 Libertarian candidate for Illinois Secretary of State
Joshua Smith

Individuals

- Larry Sharpe, Libertarian candidate for Governor of New York, 2018

Organisations

- Libertarian Party Mises Caucus
- Liberty Hangout, news media website

==== Polling ====
Poll source	Sample size	Date(s)	Dearn (withdrew)	Sarwark	Smith	Others
The Libertarian Vindicator	134	February 2018	–	47%	28%	None of the Above 25%
The Libertarian Vindicator	73	April 2018	22%	29%	41%	None of the Above 8%

==== Results ====
Libertarian National Convention LNC Chairman Vote, 2018
Candidate	First Ballot	Percentage
Nicholas Sarwark	517	65%
Joshua Smith	175	22%
Christopher Thrasher	46	6%
NOTA	33	4%
Matt Kuehnel	13	2%
John Keil	4	1%
Matthew Schutter	1	nil
Write-In	1	nil
Totals	790	100%

=== Vice chair election ===
The seat of Vice chair was also up for election, the incumbent being Arvin Vohra. Alex Merced, 2017 candidate for New York comptroller, Libertarian Youth Caucus founder Trent Somes III, 2018 Iowa gubernatorial candidate Jake Porter, Indiana activist Joe Hauptmann, Treasurer of the Libertarian Radical Caucus Steve Scheetz, former Indiana Libertarian Party chair Sam Goldstein and Montana Libertarian Joe Paschal all sought election to the position.

In January 2018 Arvin Vohra drew criticism for condoning sexual relations between adults and minors so long as affirmative consent is given, using the example of a 25-year-old male and a 15-year-old female. Multiple state Libertarian parties demanded Vohra be relieved from his position, as well as the Libertarian Youth Caucus through Trent Somes III, one of Vohra's opponents in the vice chairmanship election.

==== Endorsements ====
Alex Merced

Individuals

- Larry Sharpe, Libertarian candidate for Governor of New York, 2018

Organisations

- Libertarian Party Mises Caucus

==== Debates ====
Debates among candidates for vice chairman of the Libertarian National Committee
Date	Place	Host	Participants								
P Participant. A Absent. N Confirmed non-invitee. O Out of race (exploring, suspended, or not yet entered)			Sam Goldstein	Joe Hauptmann	Alex Merced	Joe Paschal	Jake Porter	Steve Scheetz	Trent Somes	Arvin Vohra	James Weeks
February 10	Google Hangouts	71 Republic	A	P	P	P	A	P	A	P	P
February 22	Google Hangouts	The Feldman Foundation	A	P	P	P	A	P	A	P	P
March 3	Libertarian Party of Pennsylvania 2018 Convention	Libertarian Party of Pennsylvania	A	P	P	A	A	P	A	P	A
March 10	Libertarian Party of Connecticut 2018 Convention	Libertarian Party of Connecticut	A	A	P	A	A	P	A	P	A
April 21	Libertarian Party of New York 2018 Convention	Libertarian Party of New York	A	P	P	A	A	A	A	A	A

==== Polling ====
Poll source	Sample size	Date(s)	Goldstein	Hauptmann	Merced	Paschal	Porter	Scheetz	Somes	Vohra	Weeks	Others
The Libertarian Vindicator	248	January 2018	–	6%	46%	4%	8%	6%	20%	10%	–	N/A
The Libertarian Vindicator	99	February 2018	8%	5%	59%	4%	3%	5%	–	5%	4%	None of the Above 7%

== Speakers ==
Notable speakers included:

- Jim Cantrell, entrepreneur
- Judge James P. Gray, 2012 Libertarian vice presidential nominee
- Carla Howell, former Executive Director of the Libertarian National Committee
- Zoltan Istvan, 2018 candidate for Governor of California and 2020 candidate for President of the United States
- Tim Moen, leader of the Libertarian Party of Canada (2014–)
- Brandon Phinney, Libertarian member of the New Hampshire House of Representatives (2016–2018)
- Larry Sharpe, 2016 vice presidential candidate and 2018 candidate for Governor of New York
- Joel Trammell, entrepreneur

== Controversies ==
=== Feud with Libertarian Party Mises Caucus ===
In late 2017, the Libertarian Party Mises Caucus reached out to the chairman of the 2018 LP Convention Committee, Daniel Hayes, entertaining the thought of former congressman and 1988 Libertarian Party presidential nominee Ron Paul and Freedom Watch host Judge Napolitano speaking at the convention, offering to pay off speaking fees. Hayes rejected the idea of Paul speaking at the convention, saying "he has no idea what the LP represents", criticizing Napolitano as well. Ron Paul confronted the controversy, stating he has been a lifetime member of the Libertarian Party since 1987 when he paid using a gold coin, and asked, "do I get my gold coin back?"

On February 3, 2018 Nicholas Sarwark confronted the controversy, saying in a tweet: "If Ron Paul decides he wants to attend the Libertarian Party national convention in New Orleans and speak, I'll make sure he gets time on the stage. It's the least we can do for a life member, former Presidential nominee, and Hall of Liberty award winner."

== See also ==
- United States elections, 2018
