= 2021 Libertarian National Committee chair special election =

Political party leadership election in the United States

- July 11–12, 2021

16 members of the LNC who voted 9 votes needed to win
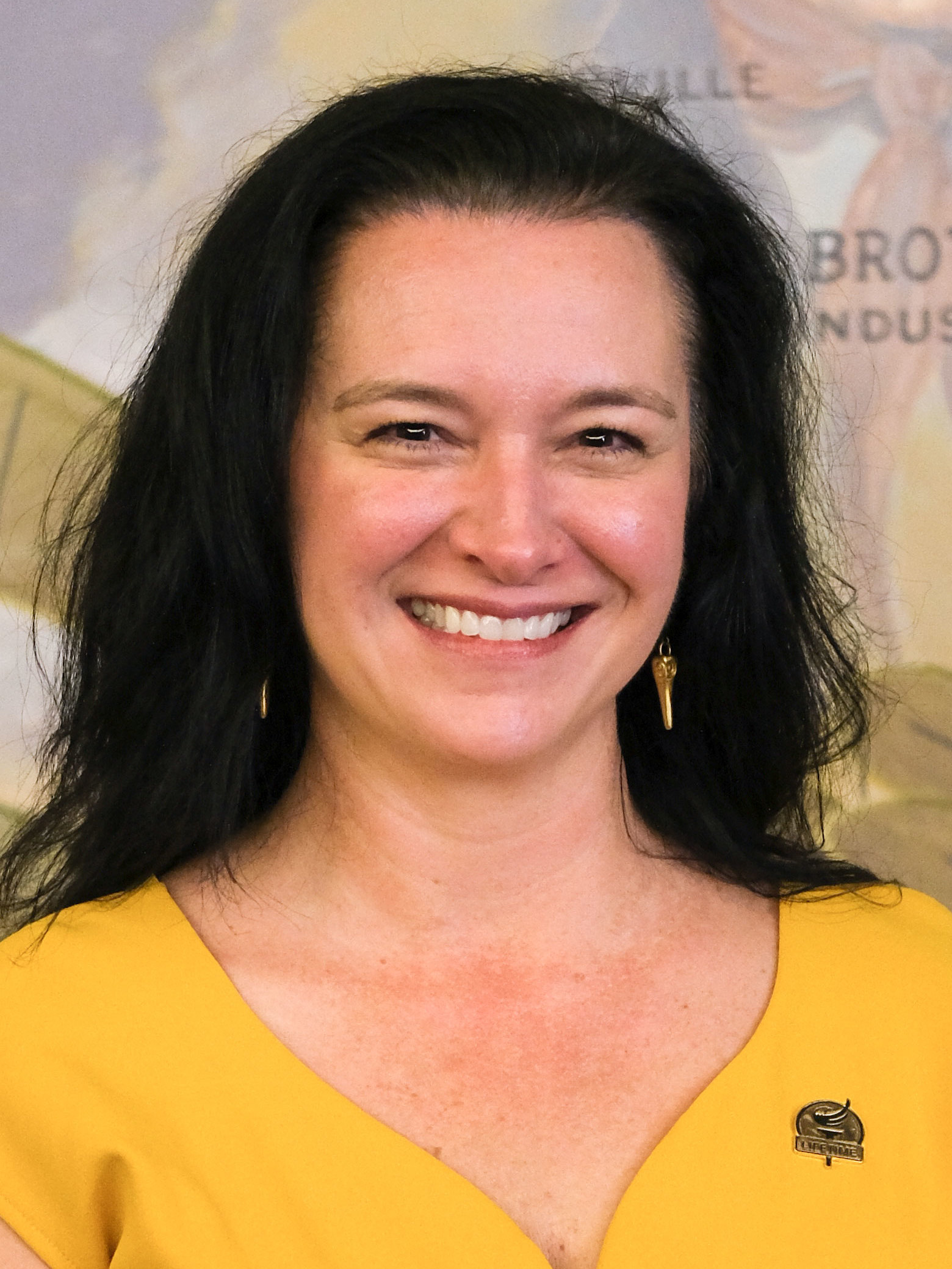

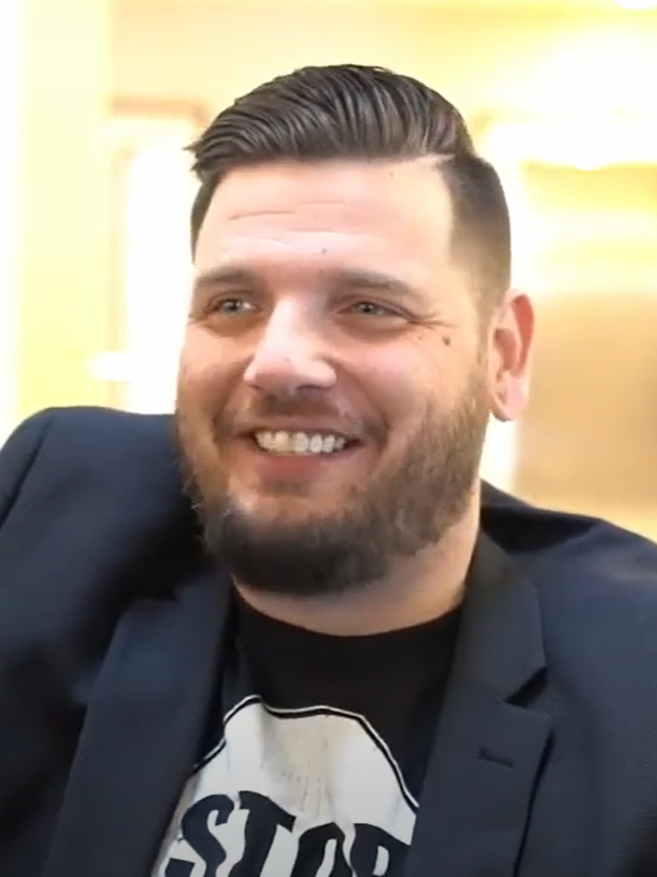

Candidate	Whitney Bilyeu	Joshua Smith	Christopher Thrasher
First round	5 (31%)	5 (31%)	2 (13%)
Fifth round	9 (56%)	5 (31%)	2 (13%)
Chair before election
Ken Moellman
(acting)
Elected Chair
Whitney Bilyeu

The 2021 Libertarian National Committee chair special election was held on July 11, 2021, by the Libertarian National Committee (LNC), the governing body of the United States Libertarian Party, to elect their next chairperson, after their previous chair, Joe Bishop-Henchman, resigned due to an internal party controversy.

After five rounds of rank-choice (instant-runoff) voting by the committee, Whitney Bilyeu was elected to serve the rest of Bishop-Henchman's term, defeating 5 other candidates.

== Background ==
=== New Hampshire controversy and Bishop-Henchman resignation ===
In June 2021, the Libertarian Party's New Hampshire affiliate wrote Tweets calling for "legalizing child labor", repealing the Civil Rights Act of 1964, and reopening Gitmo "so that Anthony Fauci and every governor that locked their state down can be sent there". In response, the Chair of the NH affiliate, Jilletta Jarvis, formed a new state affiliate and took control of the old affiliate's digital assets and Twitter account on June 12. The move was widely condemned by the party, including former US congressman Justin Amash and the party's 2020 VP nominee Spike Cohen, and Jarvis was expelled as Chair by the old affiliate

A letter surfaced allegedly from LNC chair Joe Bishop-Henchman, which recognized Jarvis's affiliate. This caused many LNC members to call for the chair to be expelled. Bishop-Henchman however denied ever writing the letter or supporting Jarvis's actions. On June 16, Bishop-Henchman introduced a motion to the LNC to disaffiliate the NH affiliate, which would have paved the way for Jarvis's affiliate to be recognized. Bishop-Henchman officially resigned after the LNC rejected the motion 12-2.

=== Post-resignation ===
LNC Vice Chair Ken Moellman from Kentucky assumed the role of Acting Chair after the resignation, until a new Chair could be elected.

== Candidates ==
- Whitney Bilyeu, chair of the Libertarian Party of Texas and member of the LNC from the 7th region
- Steve Dasbach, former LNC chair (1993-1998), and manager for Jo Jorgensen's 2020 presidential campaign
- Tony D'Orazio, LNC chair candidate in 2020
- Chuck Moulton
- Joshua Smith, LNC At-large member, and LNC chair candidate in 2018 and 2020
- Christopher Thrasher, Chair of the Libertarian Party Ballot Access Committee and Director for Lincoln Chafee's 2020 presidential campaign

== Results ==
No one won a majority of votes in the first round. Steve Dasbach, Tony D'Orazio, and Chuck Moulton were eliminated in the subsequent rounds, and Whitney Bilyeu received all the transfer votes, winning a majority on the fifth round.

2021 Libertarian National Committee chair special election
Candidate	Maximum round	Maximum votes	Share in maximum round	Maximum votes First round votesTransfer votes
Whitney Bilyeu	5	9	56%	
Joshua Smith	5	5	31%	
Christopher Thrasher	5	2	13%	
None of the above	4	1	6%	
Tony D'Orazio	3	1	6%	
Steve Dasbach	2	1	6%	
Chuck Moulton	1	1	6%	

== See also ==
- 2017 Democratic National Committee chairmanship election
- 2017 Republican National Committee chairmanship election
