= Mike ter Maat =

American economist and politician

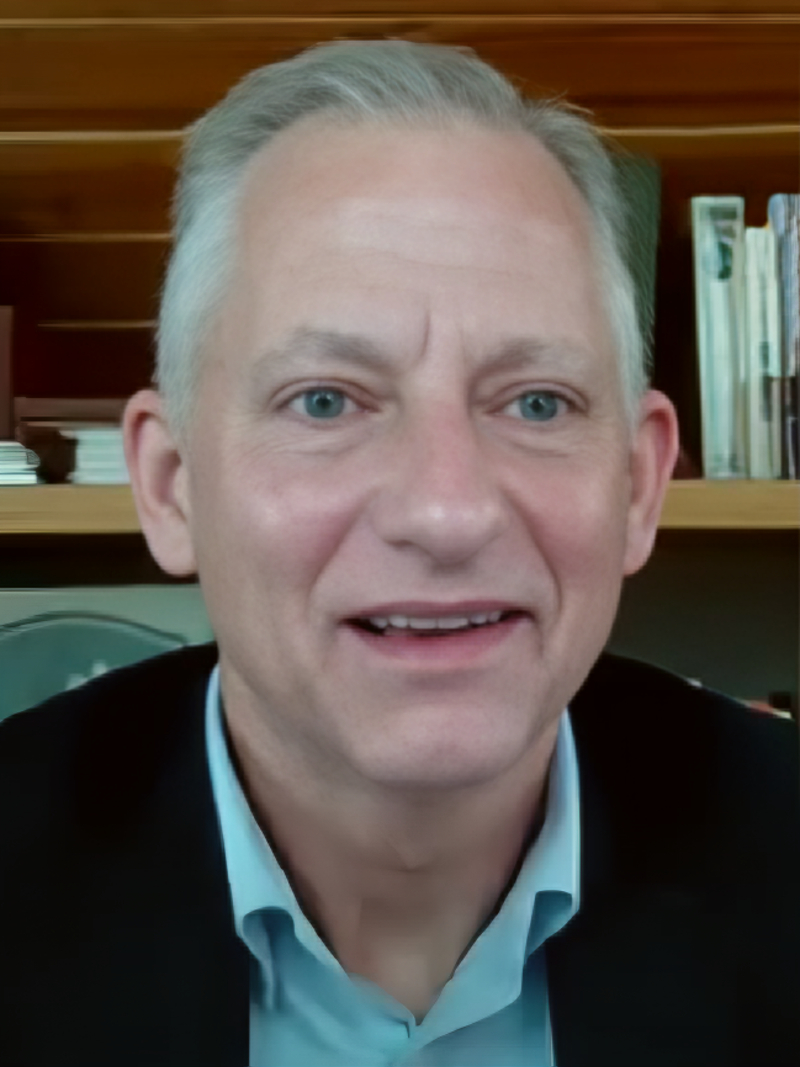
- ter Maat in 2023
- Born: Michael ter Maat; June 20, 1961 (age 65); Portland, Oregon, U.S.
- Education: Rensselaer Polytechnic Institute (BS, MBA); George Washington University (MS, PhD)
- Political party: Republican (before 2010, 2025–present); Libertarian (2010–2025)
- Website: Campaign website

Michael ter Maat (born June 6, 1961) is an American businessman, political candidate, former economist, and retired police officer. A former member of the Libertarian Party, he was the running mate to presidential nominee Chase Oliver in the 2024 presidential election. He switched his affiliation to the Republican Party and joined the Republican Liberty Caucus in 2025. He is co-host of the political podcast Liberty Lens.

== Career ==
Ter Maat received his Bachelor of Science in aeronautical engineering (1982) and Master of Business Administration in management (1983) from Rensselaer Polytechnic Institute and his Master of Science (1989) and Doctor of Philosophy (1992), both in economics, from George Washington University.

He was a financial economist for the White House Office of Management and Budget from 1989 to 1992. He served as a Senior Economist and Group Director, Information Products for the American Bankers Association from 1992 to 2002. He founded Foreword Financial and served as its program development director from 2002 to 2008. From 2008 to 2010, ter Maat served as an adjunct professor at Nova Southeastern University and Barry University. He served as a police officer for the City of Hallandale Beach, Florida from 2010 to 2021, after which he retired and moved to Kinsale, Virginia. He is co-host of the political podcast Liberty Lens.

== Political campaigns ==
=== 2022 U.S. House of Representatives campaign ===
Previously a Republican, ter Maat first ran for office as a Libertarian during Florida's 20th congressional district's special election in 2022, where he earned 0.7% of the vote.

Regarding his run for Congress, ter Maat commented, "one of the biggest problems we have as a nation is our deepening political divide and that as a Libertarian, I am particularly well-positioned to contributing to bridging this chasm."

=== 2024 presidential campaign ===
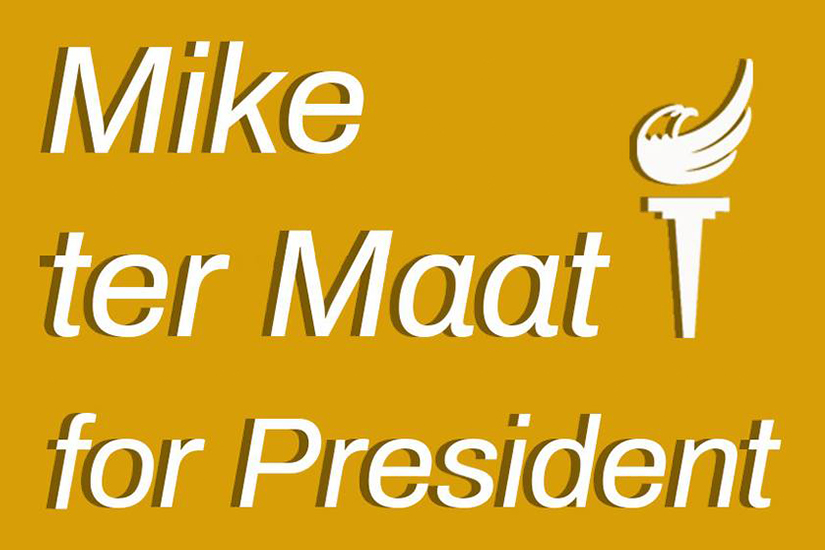
Mike ter Maat's logo for his presidential candidacy prior to the 2024 convention.

Ter Maat began his campaign seeking the 2024 Libertarian Party presidential nomination in June 2022. At the 2024 Libertarian National Convention, he finished third for president among ten nominated candidates and several write-ins.

=== 2024 vice presidential candidacy ===
After being eliminated for the Libertarian presidential nomination, ter Maat endorsed Chase Oliver for the nomination and accepted Oliver's offer to run as his vice presidential running mate after voicing dissatisfaction with the strategy employed by the Mises Caucus, which endorsed Michael Rectenwald for president. Ter Maat received 51.3% in the second round of voting, defeating runner-up Clint Russell who received 47% of the vote.

== Economist ==
After working for the American Bankers Association and the White House, ter Maat published The economics of e-cash in IEEE Spectrum, a journal published by the Institute of Electrical and Electronics Engineers in February 1997 and cited by publications including the Association for Computing Machinery and patents including for an internet payment system using smart card. He is an Austrian economist who advocates for a shift in monetary policy to a more laissez-faire model during times of recession.

In a one-on-one debate, transcribed by The Korea IT Times, with international relations scholar and independent presidential candidate Emanuel Pastreich, ter Maat asserted that "The problem is that a collapse of the federal government will lead to a collapse of financial markets all over the world, especially if the bond market dips and the US dollar collapses".

== Books ==
Ter Maat is the editor and co-author of:

- ter Maat, M., Borders, M., Consorte, D., Mavrakakis, I., Sharpe, L., Sammeroff, A., Paige, R., Jiminez, A.. A Gold New Deal: The Government We Will Tolerate. Amazon, Independently published, December 30, 2023.
- Mike ter Maat, ed. (2026). BROKEN: How American Politics Is Driving Civil Unrest, Financial Collapse & War. Independent / self-published.

Party political offices
Preceded by Spike Cohen	Libertarian nominee for Vice President of the United States; 2024	Most recent
