= Steven Nekhaila =

American politician

23rd Chair of the Libertarian National Committee
- In office February 2, 2025 – May 25, 2026
- Preceded by: Angela McArdle
- Succeeded by: Evan McMahon

Personal details
- Party: Libertarian
- Profession: Restaurant owner

Steven Nekhaila is an American politician and activist, serving since February 2025 as the 23rd and current Chair of the Libertarian National Committee, the governing body of the Libertarian Party.

Nekhaila previously served in various positions within the Libertarian Party of Florida and the LNC before he won the 2025 LNC Chair special election, which followed the resignation of his predecessor Angela McArdle.

== Biography ==
Nekhaila worked as a franchise owner of several chain restaurants before becoming involved in the Libertarian Party in 2014 as a founding member of the Libertarian Party of the Florida Keys which would merge into the Libertarian Party of Florida. Nekhaila has been a member of the Libertarian Party national board since 2016.

In 2022, Nekhaila applied to become a commissioner of Monroe County, losing to Jim Scholl. He also voiced opposition to the inundation of the Keys with cruise ships during the COVID-19 lockdowns, arguing instead that businesses should stay open.

Nekhaila had served as an at-large delegate of the Libertarian National Convention. Although not a consistent party-line supporter of the Mises Caucus, Nekhaila had been included on their endorsed slate at the 2024 Libertarian National Convention. Nekhaila stated that he wasn't opposed to the Mises Caucus, but that the caucus and its supporters needed to assimilate into the world of politics, and that ideally some of their positions should be incorporated into the national party line. He positioned himself as a "unity" Libertarian, instead of a Mises or Pragmatic Libertarian. During the convention Nekhaila attempted to oust incumbent chairwoman Angela McArdle, but placed fourth in the first round of voting and withdrew. At that convention he also denounced Donald Trump speaking as a candidate saying he "barely aligns with the [Mises] camp" and that he "is a far cry from the Libertarian Party."

=== LNC Chair ===
Following the election of Donald Trump in the 2024 United States presidential election, Angela McArdle suddenly resigned on January 24, 2025, after being credited with Trump's decision to pardon Ross Ulbricht. McArdle, whose tenure was controversial over battles with internal opponents in the party and allegations of $45,000 in payments to a company owned by her domestic partner, endorsed Michael Heise, who was also backed by the Mises Caucus since its takeover over the national committee in 2022. Over a Zoom call, the Libertarian National Committee voted 9-6 to name Nekhaila as the new chairman instead of Heise.

Although Nekhaila supported the pardon of Ulbricht, he warned of further creeping influence of the Republican party over the Libertarians, and denounced Trump over his treatment of Thomas Massie. One of Nekhaila's first acts was to denounce Donald Trump and his proposals to annex Gaza stating that it not only violates international law, but also the fundamental rights and dignity of the Palestinian people, while also denouncing the "Israeli lobby" as being in conflict with party's principles of liberty and non-interventionism.

On February 28, 2025, Nekhaila gave an interview on the Ladies Love Politics podcast where he denounced descriptions of the Mises victory in the 2022 as a "takeover", saying it was a natural cycle of internal party politics. He also stated that the Libertarian Party, especially due to the leadership of his predecessor, is faced with a dilemma of either being absorbed into the "MAGA Movement" and the Republican Party, or remaining a distinct third party. Nekhaila argued that the party rank and file must "remember" that they are Libertarians, a distinct third-party and not Republicans or Democrats, and that politicians like Trump "fall short" and that the few token concessions he's given to Libertarians "doesn't translate to real power." He also outlined his strategy for the party to return to mass fielding of candidates, hoping to stand at least 500 candidates across the country in 2026 and 2028 for major elected offices and to reverse the party's electoral decline since Gary Johnson's 2016 campaign imploded, namely to get Libertarians in state legislatures and play a role in state-politics.

On June 3, 2025, he and the Libertarian party issued a statement where they called on Donald Trump to declare a State of Emergency due to the national debt surpassing $36T. Nekhaila spearheaded an effort called "Archimedes 2.0" a revival of "Project Archimedes" from the 1990s where the Libertarian Party launched a massive recruitment campaign, setting the same goal of the first Archimedes of recruiting 100,000 new members in 2 years. Shortly after he also announced "The Parity Project" a 10-year long plan to grow the party's visibility and try to contest the major parties. On July 5, 2025, Nekhaila sought a partnership with Elon Musk when he threatened to form his own political party which he ignored. After the Death of Alex Pretti Nekhaila called for the Immigration and Customs Enforcement to be disbanded.

Nekhaila has prioritized international outlook for the party, especially seeking to capitalize on the election of Javier Milei. To this end, Nakhaila had himself elected the Libertarian Party's representative to the International Alliance of Libertarian Parties (IALP) on January 27, 2026, an office prior chairmen purposefully kept vacant.

On December 22, 2025 Nekhaila stated that he would not be seeking re-election to the chair at the 2026 Libertarian National Convention and will instead run for an at-large position on the Libertarian National Committee.
