= Libertarian Party of Indiana =

State affiliate of the Libertarian Party

- Chairperson: Stephanie Dasbach
- Founded: July 14, 1974
- Headquarters: 1111 E 54th St, Ste 158; Indianapolis, IN 46220
- Ideology: Libertarianism
- National affiliation: Libertarian Party (United States)
- Colors: Gold^{1}
- U.S. Senate: 0 / 2
- U.S. House: 0 / 9
- Statewide Executive Offices: 0 / 7
- State Senate: 0 / 50
- State House: 0 / 100
- Other elected officials: 7 (June 2024)

Website
- www.lpin.org

The Libertarian Party of Indiana is the Indiana affiliate of the Libertarian Party.

As of 2026, the party has held ballot access for 32 years, with 12 Libertarians having been elected to office across the state.

== History and operations ==
The founding meeting of the Libertarian Party of Indiana was held on July 14, 1974, at the Holiday Inn at Weir Cook Airport (now called the Indianapolis International Airport). Approximately 20–25 people attended including Paul Hyatt, Tom Duncan, Marvin Lazaro, Brian Bernstein, Dick Smith, Steve Butterbaugh, and Charlie Reisert. Reisert made the motion to start the Libertarian Party of Indiana. The first headquarters was located at 1430 N. Capitol Avenue in Indianapolis. The LPIN became a minor political party in 1994 after achieving ballot access when Steve Dillon received more than 2% of the vote running for Secretary of State.

In 2008, the Libertarian presidential ticket of Bob Barr and Wayne Allyn Root had their strongest showing in Indiana, receiving 1.1% of the vote (19,243 votes). The party's best finish in a statewide race came in 2006 when US Senate candidate Steve Osborn received about 13% of the vote. Osborn had the best result for a third-party candidate running for the Senate in the 2006 elections.

In 2020 Indiana gubernatorial election, Donald Rainwater became the third Libertarian to get in the double digits with 11.44%, second only to Alaska's Dick Randolph who won 14.91 percent in 1982.

At the 2026 Libertarian National Convention, the chairperson of the LPIN, Evan McMahon, was elected to chair the national party.

== Officials and staff ==
Officers	Officer Name (First, Last)
Chairman	Evan McMahon
Vice-chairman	James Sceniak
Secretary	Stephanie Dasbach
Treasurer	Ronnie Dickson
Staff	Staff Name (First, Last)
IT Director	Michael Schultheiss
Political Director	Vacant
Communication Director	Andrew Smith
Outreach Director	Elizabeth Coquillard

=== State Central Committee ===
Congressional District	Representative Name
1	John Schick
2	Tim Cotton
3	Kristi Avery
4	Danny Lundy
5	Lauri Shillings
6	Luke Lomax
7	Elizabeth 'Libby' Glass
8	Micahn Haynes
9	Kelly Curran

=== National Committee Representative ===
Region	Representative Name(First, Last)
5	Dustin Nanna
Alternate	Gregory Hertzsch

== Current elected officeholders ==
As of 2019, there were eight Libertarian members who held elected office in Indiana.

1. Susan Bell – Town Judge, Hagerstown
2. Cheryl Heacox – Advisory Board, Clay Township
3. Larry Walters – Town Council, Dublin
4. Jessica Wallace – Town Council, at large, Larwill
5. Jamie Jo Owens – Trustee, Liberty Township
6. Terry Coffman – Advisory Board, Liberty Township
7. Dean Hartley – Advisory Board, Franklin Township
8. Ryan Coby – Town Council, Milton
9. Nathan Kring – City Council, Tipton
10. Patricia Warner – Clerk-Treasurer, Claypool

== Appointed officeholders ==
Several Libertarians have been appointed to offices in Indiana:

- Mark W. Rutherford – Chairman, Indiana Public Defender Commission (Since 2007)
- Scott Baker – Elkhart County Innkeepers Tax Commission (Since 2006)
- Joyce Morrell – Rush County Fiber Optic Board (Since 2016)
- Tom Monka – Rush County Planning Commission (Since 2016)
- Michael Dowden – Town of Brownsburg Economic Development Commission (2017–2020); Town of Brownsburg Improvement Committee (2017); Town of Brownsburg Redevelopment Authority (2014–2016)
- Paul Morrell – Chairman, Rush County Sheriff's Officer Merit Board (Since 2017)
- Jeffrey Mauer – Carmel Economic Development Commission (Since 2020); Home Place Advisory Board (Since 2018)
- Anna Elliott – Martinsville Board of Zoning Appeals, Vice-chair (Since 2019)
- Shane Lemler – Vincennes Urban Enterprise Association Board (Since 2020)
- Joel Samuelson – Culver Planning Commission (Since 2020)
- Joseph Bachman – New Chicago Planning Commission (Since 2020); New Chicago Parks Board (Since 2020)
- Jennifer Meador – Mooresville Board of Zoning Appeals (Since 2021)
- Ryan Patterson – Secretary, Franklin County Economic Development Commission (Since 2021)

== Past state chairs ==
Year Start	Year End	Name (First, Last)
1974	1976	Paul Hyatt
1976	1979	Sally (Heistand) Callin
1979	1980	Joseph Hauptmann
1981	N/A	Joe Bryan (deceased)
1981	1982	Kevin Grant
1983	N/A	Mike Fallahay
1984	1985	Steve Dasbach
1985	1986	Jim Reidenauer (deceased)
1986	1987	Dr. Walter Weeks
1987	1988	Roger Strater
1988	N/A	Bonnie Flemmonds
1988	1989	Steve Dasbach
1989	1996	Dr. Barbara Bourland
1996	1998	Rob Shuford
1998	2000	Joseph Hauptmann
2000	2007	Mark Rutherford
2007	2009	Todd Singer
2009	2013	Sam Goldstein
2013	2015	Dan Drexler
2015	2017	Joseph Hauptmann
2017	2021	Timothy Maguire
2021	2026	Evan McMahon

== Past candidates ==
- Donald Rainwater was the 2020 LPIN nominee for Governor for Indiana. He lost to incumbent Governor Eric Holcomb, but he made a large impact in the election by receiving 11.4% (345,567 votes) of the vote after polling as high as 25%. His success has invigorated the Libertarian Party of Indiana, especially in the light of his 2nd-place finish in 1/3 of the 92 counties. Their motto in the 2021 convention, "Level Up" has inspired them to make serious moves to be a party of contention in Indiana politics.
- Steve Osborn was the 2006 Libertarian Party nominee for US Senate from Indiana. He lost to incumbent Republican Senator Dick Lugar in the 2006 United States Senate election in Indiana. He was Lugar's only opponent on the ballot in that election, as the Democratic Party did not field a candidate. Osborn received about 13% of the vote, the best result for a Libertarian in the 2006 U.S. national-level elections. His previous political experience includes attempted bids for the Democratic nomination for U.S. Representative in his home district in 2000 and 2002. Osborn is from La Porte, Indiana.
- Paul Hager ran for the U.S. Representative in Indiana's 8th district in 1994, 1996, and 1998. Also, he ran for US Senate in 2000. In 2002, he ran for Indiana Secretary of State on the issue of voting reform.

== See also ==
- List of state Libertarian Parties in the United States
