= Mises Caucus =

Caucus of the U.S. Libertarian Party

- Libertarian Party Mises Caucus
- Abbreviation: LPMC
- Named after: Ludwig von Mises
- Formation: 2017
- Founder: Michael Heise
- Type: Party caucus
- Registration no.: C00699785
- Legal status: Political Action Committee
- Purpose: Political realignment of the US Libertarian Party behind the ideas of Ron Paul
- Headquarters: Norristown, Pennsylvania
- Board of directors: Angela McArdle (Chair); David Hynes (Secretary); Kyle Burton (Treasurer); Brodi Elwood; Aaron Harris; Jeffrey Douglas; Luke Ensor
- Revenue: ▲US$568,890.55 (2021)
- Disbursements: ▲US$484,907.97
- Website: lpmisescaucus.com

The Libertarian Party Mises Caucus (LPMC) is a caucus within the Libertarian Party in the United States that promotes paleolibertarianism, fusionism, as well as a more conservative version of American libertarianism associated with the presidential campaigns of former U.S. congressman Ron Paul. It was founded in 2017 by Michael Heise, mainly in opposition to Nicholas Sarwark's position as party chairman and the pragmatic faction of the party associated with the presidential campaigns of former New Mexico Governor Gary Johnson. It is named after economist Ludwig von Mises.

The caucus has support of some prominent libertarians, such as comedian Dave Smith, political commentator Tom Woods, and radio host Scott Horton. Ron Paul once called the caucus "the libertarian wing of the Libertarian Party." The caucus has also been highly controversial, and has been accused by their critics of harboring bigotry or being plants of the Republican Party, which the Mises Caucus denies.

The Mises Caucus has shifted the Libertarian Party further toward the right ever since their party's national convention in May 2022.

== History ==
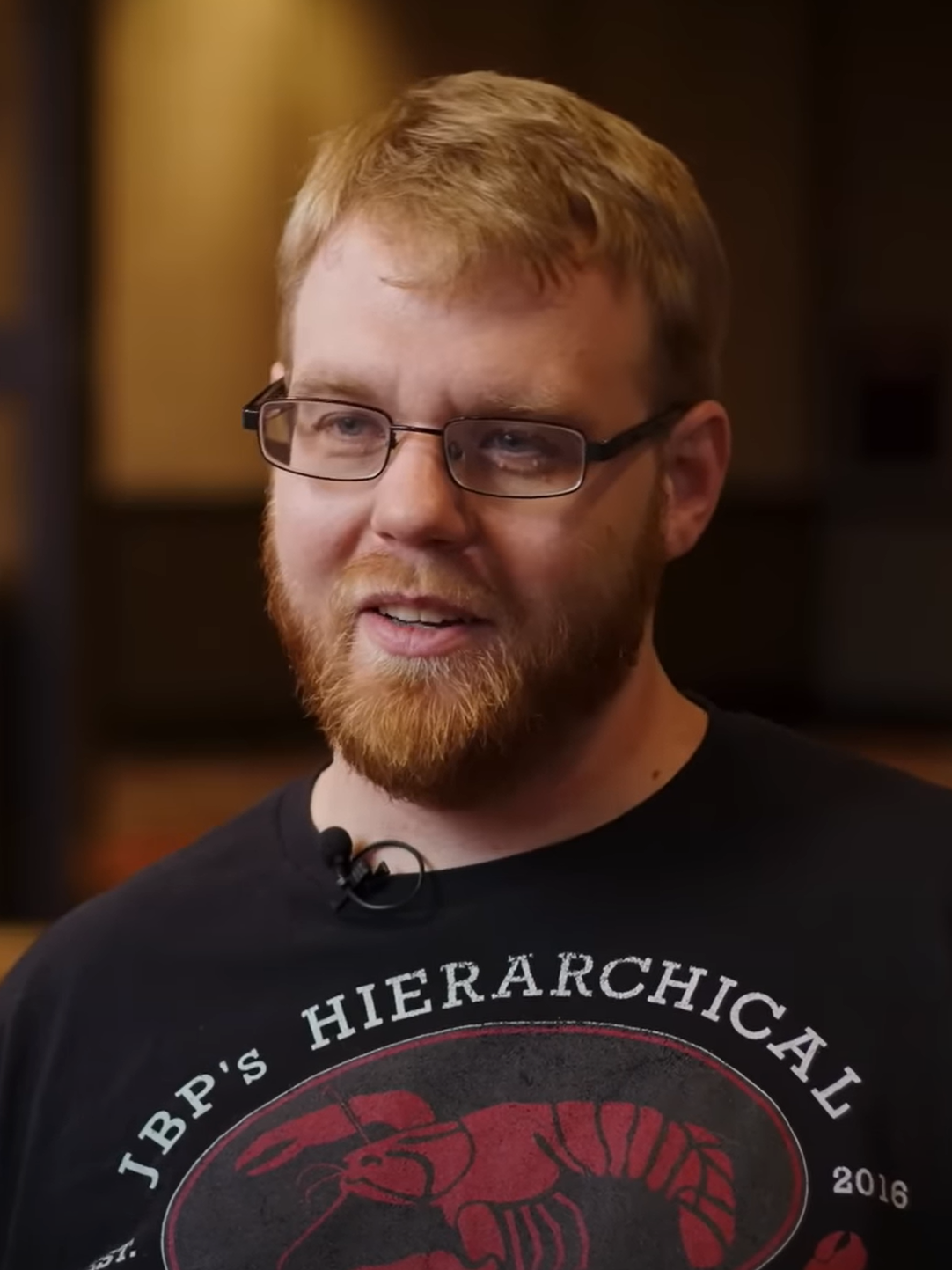
Founder and chairman Michael Heise at the 2022 Libertarian National Convention

=== 2017–2018 ===
In August 2017, in the aftermath of the Unite the Right rally, Libertarian National Committee chairman Nicholas Sarwark and vice-chairman Arvin Vohra criticized the leadership of the Mises Institute think tank – specifically president Jeff Deist and senior fellow Tom Woods – for making nationalist statements in the weeks prior to the rally, particularly in an article written by Deist which included the phrase "blood and soil". Sarwark also criticized Woods's defense of Murray Rothbard's paleolibertarian strategy, while Vohra accused the Mises Institute of being white nationalist and alt-right. The Mises Caucus formed in the aftermath of this feud to oppose Sarwark, and became one of the fastest-growing factions within the Libertarian Party. The caucus is named after the economist Ludwig von Mises and is "dedicated to [his] beliefs and works".

In February 2018, the Mises Caucus endorsed LNC member Joshua Smith to challenge Sarwark for party chair in the 2018 Libertarian National Convention. Sarwark defeated Smith, 65–22%. The day prior to the convention, Woods and the caucus organized a parallel event called the Take Human Action Bash, featuring Scott Horton and Ron Paul as speakers, with the latter calling the caucus "the libertarian wing of the Libertarian Party".

=== 2019–2021 ===
In 2019, the Mises Caucus launched a political action committee, Mises PAC, to raise money for Libertarian candidates.

The caucus supported Jacob Hornberger's campaign in the 2020 Libertarian Party presidential primaries and again endorsed Smith for party chairman. Both were defeated in their respective races at the 2020 Libertarian National Convention.

In June 2021, the Mises-controlled New Hampshire state affiliate (LPNH) made controversial tweets calling for "legalizing child labor", repealing the Civil Rights Act of 1964, and re-opening Gitmo "so that Anthony Fauci and every governor that locked their state down can be sent there". In response, LPNH chair Jilletta Jarvis took control of the state party's digital assets and Twitter account and disavowed the Mises Caucus members of the state party committee. This move was widely condemned by many in the caucus (and some in the party outside the caucus), including 2020 vice presidential nominee Spike Cohen and former U.S. congressman Justin Amash. LNC Chair Bishop-Henchman moved for the LNC to disaffiliate the LPNH, alleging that the Mises faction had violated the national party's Statement of Principles. Both Jarvis and Bishop-Henchman resigned from their positions after the LNC rejected the disaffiliation motion.

=== 2022 takeover of the LNC ===
In 2021, Mises Caucus board member Angela McArdle announced her intention to run for party chair. She was later endorsed by the caucus. At the 2022 Libertarian National Convention, McArdle won the party chair election with over 69% of the vote. The caucus also won all the leadership positions on the LNC, and thus completed the takeover of the Libertarian Party by the Mises Caucus.

In response to the Mises Caucus-controlled LNC, the Libertarian Party affiliates in the States of New Mexico, Virginia, and Massachusetts disaffiliated from the national Libertarian Party; in late 2022, the former affiliates formed the Association of Liberty State Parties.

In April 2022, the Keystone Party of Pennsylvania splintered off from the Libertarian Party as a result of the that year's Mises Caucus takeover in the state.

In 2023, the Libertarian Party of Michigan entered a leadership dispute stemming from the July 2022 removal of its Michigan Mises PAC-affiliated chair. This led to a subsequent trademark lawsuit filing by the LNC.

Since the 2022 takeover of the LNC, the largely Mises Caucus-aligned leadership has overseen a decline in party revenue.

=== 2024–present ===
The Mises Caucus supported Michael Rectenwald in the 2024 Libertarian Party presidential primaries. The caucus also backed Clint Russell to be the Libertarian Party's nominee for US Vice President. Both Rectenwald and Russell lost their nominations at the 2024 Libertarian National Convention, the former which, before losing the nominating vote, gave a speech while stoned.

In April 2024, the Mises-aligned LNC Chair Angela McArdle announced former President Donald Trump had accepted an invite to the 2024 libertarian convention in late May. McArdle said she invited both Trump and incumbent President Joe Biden to come, but only Trump said "yes"; however, a memo obtained by Reason magazine alleged that McArdle was contacted by the Trump campaign to give him a slot at the convention. Critics of the Mises Caucus saw the LNC booking Trump at the Convention as proof that the caucus is right-wing or MAGA.

On January 25, 2025, McArdle resigned as LNC Chair, and Mises Caucus endorsed their founder Michael Heise to succeed her. In the LNC Chair special election on February 2, Heise lost to Steven Nekhaila, an LNC At-large member. Although Nekhaila was part of the Mises Caucus slate at the 2024 Libertarian National Convention, his win is seen as the collapse of Mises control over the Libertarian Party at the national level. Six LNC members who were backed by the Mises Caucus in 2024 voted against their founder and their caucus's official candidate for LNC Chair.

On June 2, 2025, McArdle announced she has stepped in as the new Chair of the Mises Caucus.

== Political positions ==
=== Platform ===
The Mises Caucus platform states that they:

- support private property rights and reject socialism
- support the Austrian School of economics
- reject mainstream monetary policies, such as central banking and state-issued currency
- support decentralization, including secession and localism, "all the way down to the individual"
- support non-interventionist foreign policy and opposition to war
- reject identity politics

The platform notably does not address immigration or abortion rights.

=== Other positions ===
==== Party "Takeover" ====
Prior to the 2022 Libertarian National Convention, the Mises Caucus was highly critical of the Libertarian National Committee and the pragmatic faction of the party, and stated their goal was to "takeover" the Libertarian Party and realign it closer to Ron Paul's presidential campaigns and the Mises Institute. The caucus has accused many in the party outside their caucus of supporting political correctness and "wokeism" and being "SJW friendly".

Angela McArdle, a board member of the Mises Caucus, said in 2021 that the party should be ideologically closer to Ron Paul than Gary Johnson, and that Johnson does not "put a fire in anyone's hearts".

==== COVID-19 ====
During the COVID-19 pandemic, the caucus strongly opposed lockdowns, mask mandates, vaccine passports and vaccine mandates. The Mises Caucus also criticized the wider party for being silent and "not taking a stand".

==== Electoral strategy ====
The Mises Caucus believes the Libertarian Party should focus running political candidates for local offices rather than the statewide or federal offices, since they view the latter as too unrealistic. Additionally they believe in working with the Republican Party to achieve policy objectives, rather than running candidates against them, particularly in statewide and federal offices.

==== Secession ====
The caucus has promoted a "peaceful separation" and "national divorce" of local governments from the United States. It has also donated to candidates and initiatives seeking to nullify federal law.

== Leadership ==
=== Chair of the Mises Caucus ===
#	Image	Chair	Term start	Term end
1		Michael Heise	2017 Caucus founded	2023
2		Aaron Harris	2023	June 2, 2025
3		Angela McArdle	June 2, 2025	Incumbent

== Political activity ==
=== Inside the Libertarian Party ===
Chair of the Libertarian National Committee
Election	Candidate	Result	Final %
2018	Joshua Smith	Lost	22%
2020	Joshua Smith	Lost	39%
2022	Angela McArdle	Won	69%
2024	Angela McArdle	Won	53.44%
2025 (special)	Michael Heise	Lost	40%

=== 2020 ===
==== U.S. President ====
Candidate	Office	Primaries	Primary result	Final %	General result	%
Jacob Hornberger	President of the United States	2020 Libertarian Party presidential primaries	Lost at convention	28%	Did not qualify	N/A

=== 2024 ===
==== U.S. President ====
Candidate	Office	Primaries	Primary result	Final %	General result	%
Michael Rectenwald	President of the United States	2024 Libertarian Party presidential primaries	Lost at convention	45%	Did not qualify	N/A

==== U.S. Vice President ====
Candidate	Office	Primaries	Nominating result	Final %	General result	%
Clint Russel	Vice President of the United States	None (Note: The Libertarian Party nominates their candidates for President and Vice President (VP) separately. Libertarian VP candidates run their own campaigns before the nomination, but do not participate in the primaries)	Lost	47%	Did not qualify	N/A

== Criticism ==
The Mises Caucus has been highly controversial within and outside the Libertarian Party. The Southern Poverty Law Center has described the group as far-right. The caucus has been accused of harboring racists, anti-semites, and transphobes. The caucus strongly denies these claims. (Note: Mises Caucus chair Michael Heise denies the charges of racism, arguing their appeal is among "youths who are into edgy podcasts". Dempsey, member of the Mises-controlled LPNH affiliate said "I passionately reject the notion that Mises Caucus is completely, or filled with, racists or bigots".)

In his resignation letter as LNC chair, Bishop-Henchman accused the Mises Caucus of having a "toxic culture" and "bad actors" that is "destroying and driving people away from the party". In June 2021, former congressman Justin Amash criticized the Mises-controlled New Hampshire affiliate for "edgelording" and being unprofessional in their messaging.

Former New Hampshire legislator Caleb Q. Dyer criticized the caucus for claiming neutrality in the culture war "while picking the right-wing side", and called it disingenuous.

In December 2021, Jeremy Thompson, Libertarian Party of Massachusetts Director of Operations explained to the Libertarian National Committee how the comments from Mises-controlled Libertarian Party of New Hampshire were not just "mean words" but "actual harassment".

In May 2022, the Southern Poverty Law Center (SPLC) said that "Members of the Libertarian Party are concerned about the Mises Caucus winning control of the party at the May 26 national convention, ushering in an era of collaboration between the U.S.'s largest third party and the hard-right movement inside the Republican Party". The SPLC said that Caucus chair and founder Michael Heise had cited donations received from Patrick M. Byrne and nominated Daryl Brooks for Governor of Pennsylvania. Both Byrne and Brooks promoted the conspiracy theory that the 2020 presidential election was stolen from Donald Trump, the SPLC said.
