= Ron Paul presidential campaign =

Ron Paul has unsuccessfully run for president three times; it may refer to:

- Ron Paul 1988 presidential campaign
- Ron Paul 2008 presidential campaign
- Ron Paul 2012 presidential campaign
