= 2024 Libertarian National Convention =

- 2024 presidential election

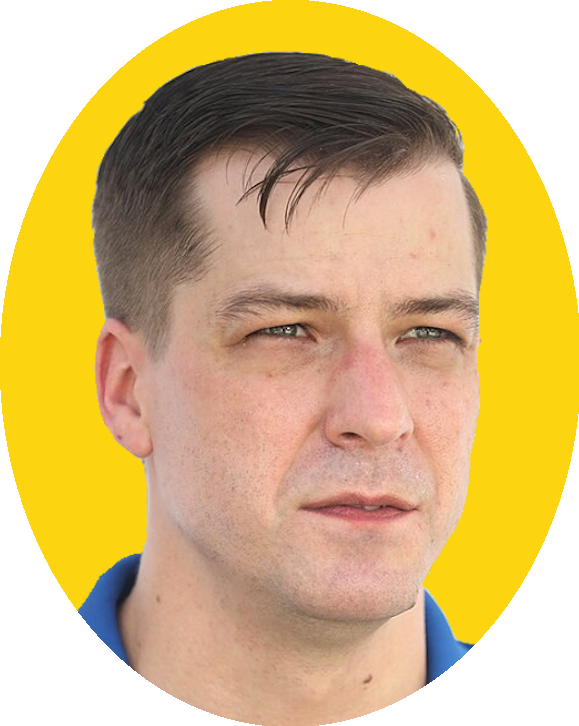
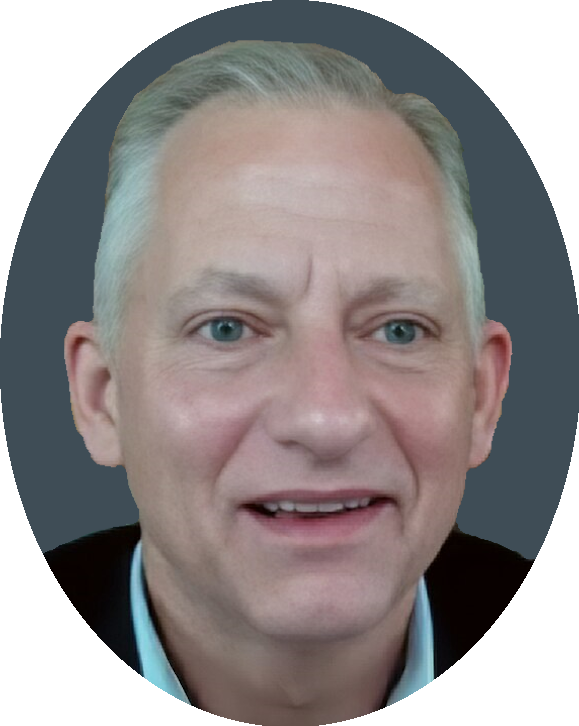
- Nominees; Oliver and ter Maat

Convention
- Dates: May 24–27, 2024
- City: Washington, D.C.
- Venue: Washington Hilton
- Chair: Angela McArdle

Candidates
- Presidential nominee: Chase Oliver of Georgia
- Vice-presidential nominee: Mike ter Maat of Virginia

Voting
- Total delegates: 1,051
- Votes needed for nomination: 526

The 2024 Libertarian National Convention was a political event to select the Libertarian Party nominees for president and vice president in the 2024 election. It was held from May 24 to the early morning of May 27, 2024, at the Washington Hilton in Washington, D.C.

== Background ==
Elections were held for the chairmanship of the Libertarian National Committee, currently held by Angela McArdle, as well as the position of vice chair, currently held by Andrew Watkins. McArdle was elected at the 2022 convention in Reno, Nevada, by acquiring the votes of 69% of delegates. She was elected with the support of the Mises Caucus, which was created in opposition to Nicholas Sarwark's tenure as chairman. Independent candidate Robert F. Kennedy Jr. originally ruled out a nomination, then accepted a nomination the day of the convention, but was eliminated in the first round with 19 delegate votes. Donald Trump asked for the party nomination but was disqualified for not having submitted the appropriate paperwork.

== Presidential nomination ==
Candidates needed to submit papers with the signatures of at least 30 delegates to be nominated. The following candidates met the threshold:

- Lars Mapstead
- Art Olivier
- Mike ter Maat
- Joshua "Toad" Anderson
- Robert F. Kennedy Jr.
- Joshua Smith
- Charles Ballay
- Chase Oliver
- Michael Rectenwald
- Jacob Hornberger

A delegate also attempted to nominate Donald Trump, but the nomination was considered invalid due to Trump not submitting nomination papers.

=== Balloting ===
Ten candidates were nominated for the first round. Delegates could also cast a write-in vote or vote for none of the above (NOTA). If no candidate reaches 50%, the candidate with the lowest vote total and all candidates below 5% are eliminated and the convention votes again.

Ballay, Kennedy, Anderson, and Art Olivier were eliminated after the first round, Hornberger was eliminated after the second round, Smith was eliminated after the third round, Mapstead was eliminated after the fourth round, ter Maat was eliminated after the fifth round.

Following his elimination in the fifth round, ter Maat announced he would run as Chase Oliver's running mate. Michael Heise, founder of the Mises Caucus, which endorsed Rectenwald, noted that the caucus also offered ter Maat the vice presidential position.

The sixth round was a head-to-head between Oliver and Rectenwald. No candidate received 50% of the vote due to votes for NOTA and write-ins. As the lowest placed nominated candidate, Rectenwald was eliminated. This set up a seventh round between Oliver and NOTA. Chair Angela McArdle noted that should NOTA receive a majority, the party would not nominate a candidate for president.

Chase Oliver won the nomination on the seventh ballot with 60.6% of the vote.

This is the first convention that delegates did not nominate the candidate who won the first round of voting since the 2004 convention.

Candidate	1st ballot		2nd ballot			3rd ballot			4th ballot			5th ballot			6th ballot			7th ballot		
Candidate	Votes	%	Votes	%	±	Votes	%	±	Votes	%	±	Votes	%	±	Votes	%	±	Votes	%	±
Chase Oliver	181	19.7%	219	24.0%	+4.3%	230	25.4%	+1.4%	231	25.9%	+0.5%	286	32.9%	+7.0%	423	49.5%	+16.6%	497	60.6%	+11.1%
None of the above	11	1.2%	7	0.8%	−0.4%	9	1.0%	+0.2%	10	1.1%	+0.1%	22	2.5%	+1.4%	44	5.2%	+2.7%	300	36.6%	+21.4%
Write-ins	13 (Note: 6 votes for Donald Trump)	1.4%	8	0.9%	−0.5%	2	0.2%	−0.7%	1 (Note: for Mike Shipley)	0.1%	−0.1%	3 (Note: 1 vote for Trump, 1 vote for Robert F. Kennedy Jr.)	0.3%	+0.2%	5 (Note: 1 vote for Trump, 1 vote for Kennedy, 1 vote for Mike ter Maat)	0.6%	+0.3%	23	2.8%	+1.2%
Michael Rectenwald	259	28.2%	293	32.2%	+4.0%	319	35.2%	+3.0%	335	37.6%	+2.4%	334	38.4%	+0.8%	382	44.7%	+6.3%	Eliminated		
Mike ter Maat	141	15.3%	162	17.8%	+2.5%	165	18.2%	+0.4%	175	19.6%	+1.4%	225	25.9%	+6.3%	Eliminated					
Lars Mapstead	122	13.3%	123	13.5%	+0.2%	137	15.1%	+1.6%	139	15.6%	+0.5%	Eliminated								
Joshua Smith	73	7.9%	62	6.8%	−1.1%	45	5.0%	−1.8%	Eliminated											
Jacob Hornberger	59	6.4%	37	4.1%	−2.3%	Eliminated														
Charles Ballay	21	2.3%	Eliminated																	
Robert F. Kennedy Jr.	19	2.1%	Eliminated																	
Joshua "Toad" Anderson	16	1.7%	Eliminated																	
Art Olivier	4	0.4%	Eliminated																	
Votes cast	919	87.4%	911	86.7%	−0.7%	907	86.3%	−0.4%	891	84.8%	−1.5%	870	82.8%	−2.0%	854	81.3%	−1.5%	820	78.0%	−3.3%

== Vice presidential nomination ==
Candidates needed to submit papers with the signatures of at least 30 delegates to be nominated. The following candidates met the threshold:

- Clint Russell
- Kendal Ludden
- Mark Stewart Greenstein
- Mike ter Maat
- Freddie Clegg

=== Balloting ===
Five candidates were nominated for the first round. Delegates could also write-in a candidate or vote for NOTA in any round. If no candidate reaches 50%, the candidate with the lowest vote total and all candidates below 5% are eliminated and the convention votes again. Delegates voted to suspend the rules and additionally suspend all candidates with below 15% in the first round.

Clegg, Greenstein, and Ludden were eliminated after the first round.

Mike ter Maat, who was endorsed by presidential nominee Chase Oliver, was nominated on the second ballot with 51.3% of the vote.

Candidate	1st ballot		2nd ballot		
Candidate	Votes	%	Votes	%	±
Mike ter Maat	367	49.7%	371	51.3%	+1.6%
Clint Russell	339	45.9%	340	47.0%	+1.1%
None of the above	8	1.1%	8	1.1%	+0.0%
Write-ins	10 (Note: 6 votes for Kristi Alexander, 1 vote for Spike Cohen, 1 vote for Larry Sharpe)	1.4%	4 (Note: 1 vote for Nicole Shanahan)	0.6%	−0.8%
Freddie Clegg	9	1.2%	Eliminated		
Kendal Ludden	3	0.4%	Eliminated		
Mark Stewart Greenstein	3	0.4%	Eliminated		
Votes cast	739	70.3%	723	68.8%	−1.5%

== Convention speakers ==
According to the convention website, the following people were scheduled to appear as convention speakers:

- Robert F. Kennedy Jr., environmental lawyer and independent presidential candidate
- Mike Lee, Republican U.S. Senator from Utah (since 2011)
- Peter A. McCullough, cardiologist and epidemiologist
- Vivek Ramaswamy, entrepreneur and former Republican presidential candidate
- Gabriel Shipton, brother of Julian Assange
- Ron Paul, former U.S. Representative (1976–1977, 1979–1985, 1997–2013), 1988 Libertarian presidential nominee, 2008 and 2012 candidate for the Republican presidential nomination
- Mark Skousen, economist and writer
- Dave Smith, comedian and commentator
- Donald Trump, former president (2017–2021) and presumptive Republican presidential nominee

After the May 1 announcement that Trump would be addressing the convention, Kennedy proposed a formal debate between the two at the convention, as he would also be making an appearance. According to Kennedy, Trump declined.

Inviting Trump to speak was highly controversial within the party, and a motion was introduced on the Libertarian National Committee to rescind the invitation issued by party chair McArdle. During his speech, Trump made a play for the Libertarian nomination and vowed to appoint a Libertarian to his cabinet.

Ramaswamy, in addition to speaking, engaged in a debate with the winner of the libertarian vice-presidential debate, which is to be determined by a straw poll at the convention.

Nicole Shanahan, the running mate of Robert F. Kennedy Jr., was anticipated to speak on May 26. However, she backed out after Kennedy was eliminated from contention for the Libertarian nomination in the first round of balloting.

== Delegate allocation ==
2024 LNC delegate allocation. Only states and territories with recognized affiliates are granted delegates.

Delegates to the convention are allocated to state party affiliates based on the number of sustaining members of the national Libertarian Party per state, as well as the percentage of the vote cast by state in the 2020 presidential election for Libertarian nominee Jo Jorgensen. A total of 1,051 delegates are currently selected to vote at the convention.

== See also ==
- 2024 Libertarian Party presidential primaries
- 2024 Democratic National Convention
- 2024 Republican National Convention
