= Angela McArdle =

American politician (born 1983)

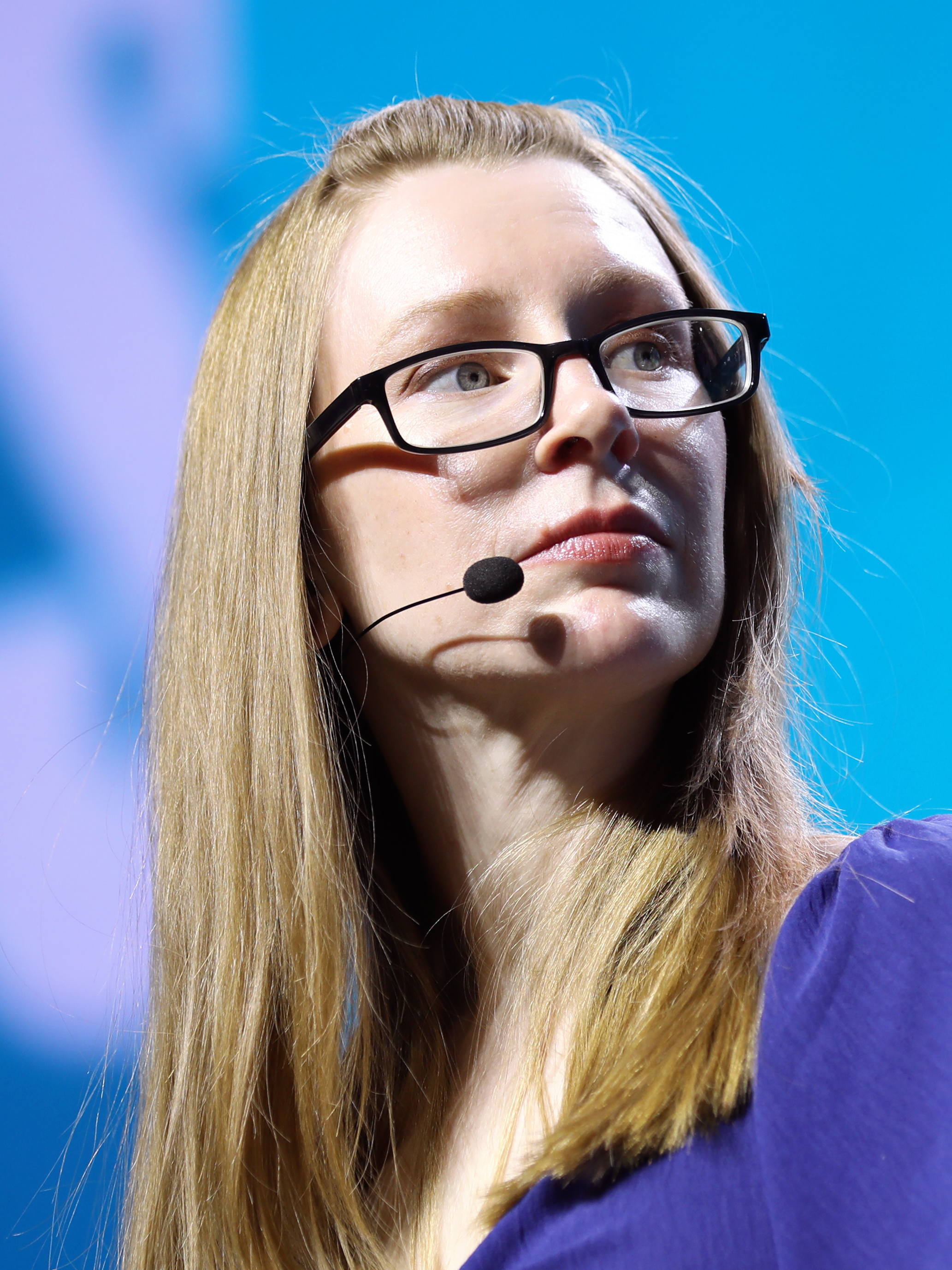
- McArdle in 2024

Chair of the Mises Caucus
- Incumbent
- Assumed office June 2, 2025
- Preceded by: Aaron Harris

22nd Chair of the Libertarian National Committee
- In office May 28, 2022 – February 2, 2025
- Preceded by: Whitney Bilyeu
- Succeeded by: Steven Nekhaila

Secretary of the Libertarian Party of California
- In office April 29, 2018 – April 6, 2019
- Preceded by: Honor Robson
- Succeeded by: Paul Vallandigham

Personal details
- Born: Angela Elise McArdle; June 7, 1983 (age 43)
- Party: Republican (2026-present)
- Other political affiliations: Libertarian (2017-2025) Mises Caucus
- Children: 1
- Education: Biola University (BA); University of California, Los Angeles (CP)

Angela Elise McArdle (born June 7, 1983) is an American politician who is the chair of the Mises Caucus, a political action committee, since June 2025. She previously served as the 22nd chair of the Libertarian National Committee (LNC) from May 2022 to February 2025, secretary of the Libertarian Party of California from April 2018 to April 2019 and a former board member and organizer of the Mises Caucus before May 2022. McArdle would be investigated for self-dealing by the LNC the day before she resigned, with the LNC reporting that not only had she committed gross fiduciary violations, but that she is “unfit to serve on the Libertarian National Committee, as an affiliate leader or as a candidate representing the Libertarian Party.”

Under her tenure as LNC Chair, McArdle was claimed to have played a key role in leveraging the Libertarian Party's spoiler effect into securing a pardon for Ross Ulbricht by Donald Trump, something McArdle herself denies, instead arguing that Trump had a signed pardon ready to go from 2020 that he was foiled from delivering by disloyal underlings.

== Early life and education ==
McArdle has worked as a paralegal and legal aide for over eleven years. She currently works in litigation and also has a private practice where she provides self-help legal services to low-income clients. The bulk of McArdle's practices focus on real estate and constitutional law.

McArdle received her Bachelor's Degree in Organizational Leadership from Biola University in 2009 and a Paralegal Certificate from UCLA Extension in 2013. She is also trained as a craniosacral therapist through the Upledger Institute.

== Career ==
McArdle was the Libertarian nominee in the 2017 California's 34th congressional district special election. She finished the primary in 17th place out of a field of 22 candidates with 0.8%. McArdle ran again for the seat in 2018 and finished in 3rd place in a field of 3 candidates with 8.4%.

In 2021 and 2022, McArdle was a candidate for Chair of the Libertarian National Committee. She was endorsed by the Mises Caucus, of which she was also a board member. She was elected to the position at the 2022 Libertarian National Convention on May 28.

At Porcfest 2021, an annual libertarian festival held in New Hampshire, Executive Director of the Free State Project, Jeremy Kauffman and McArdle debated which strategy is more effective, the libertarian party strategy or the free state movement strategy. Kauffman argued that, "There are more people in this room that are elected members to the NH House of Representatives and former members of the Libertarian Party than there are Libertarian Party members nationwide." McArdle then counter-argued that while she wants to see the Free State Project succeed, it is her contention that the Free State Project could not have existed without the political infrastructure provided by the LP developed over the course of five decades.

=== LNC Chair ===
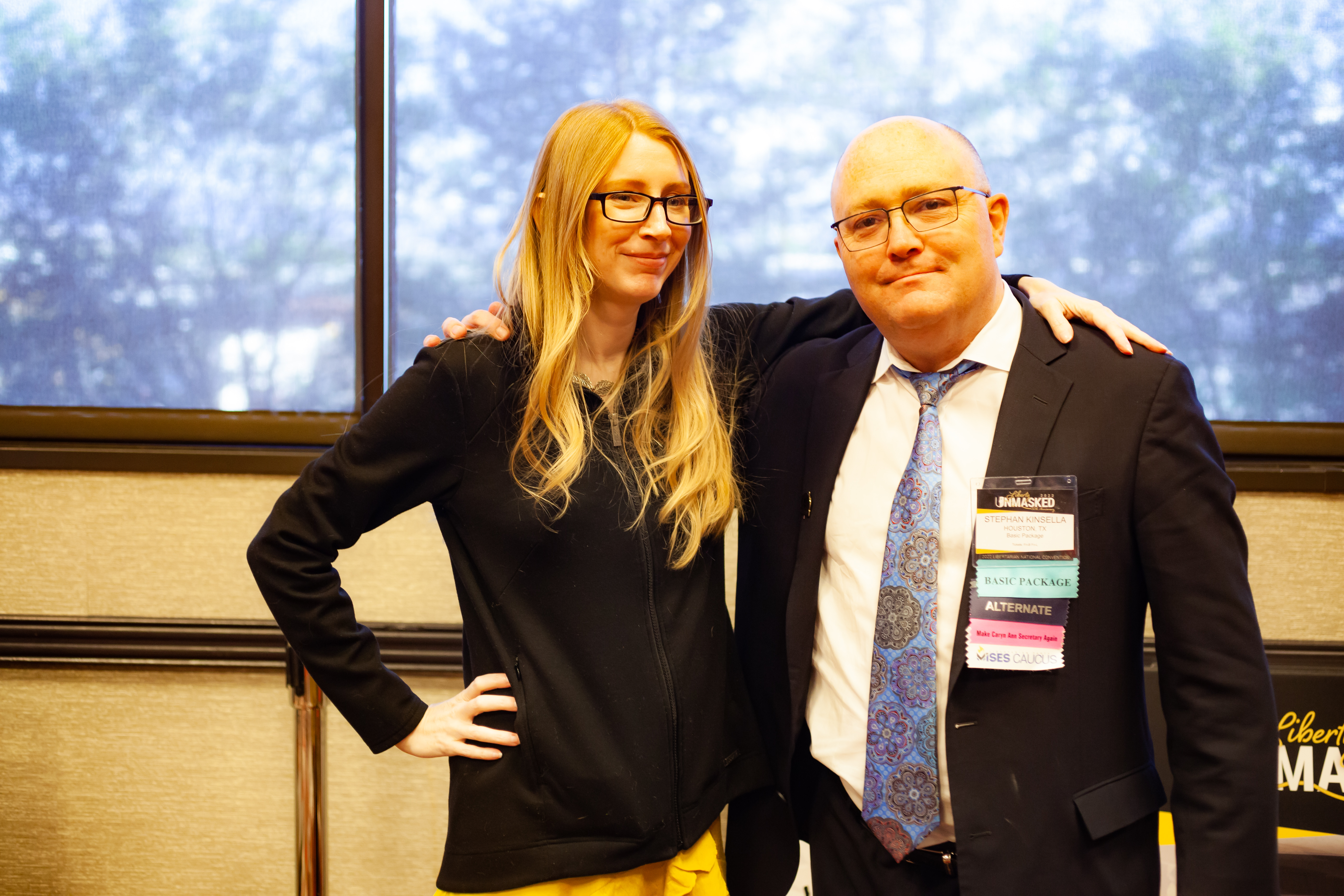
McArdle at the 2022 Libertarian National Convention

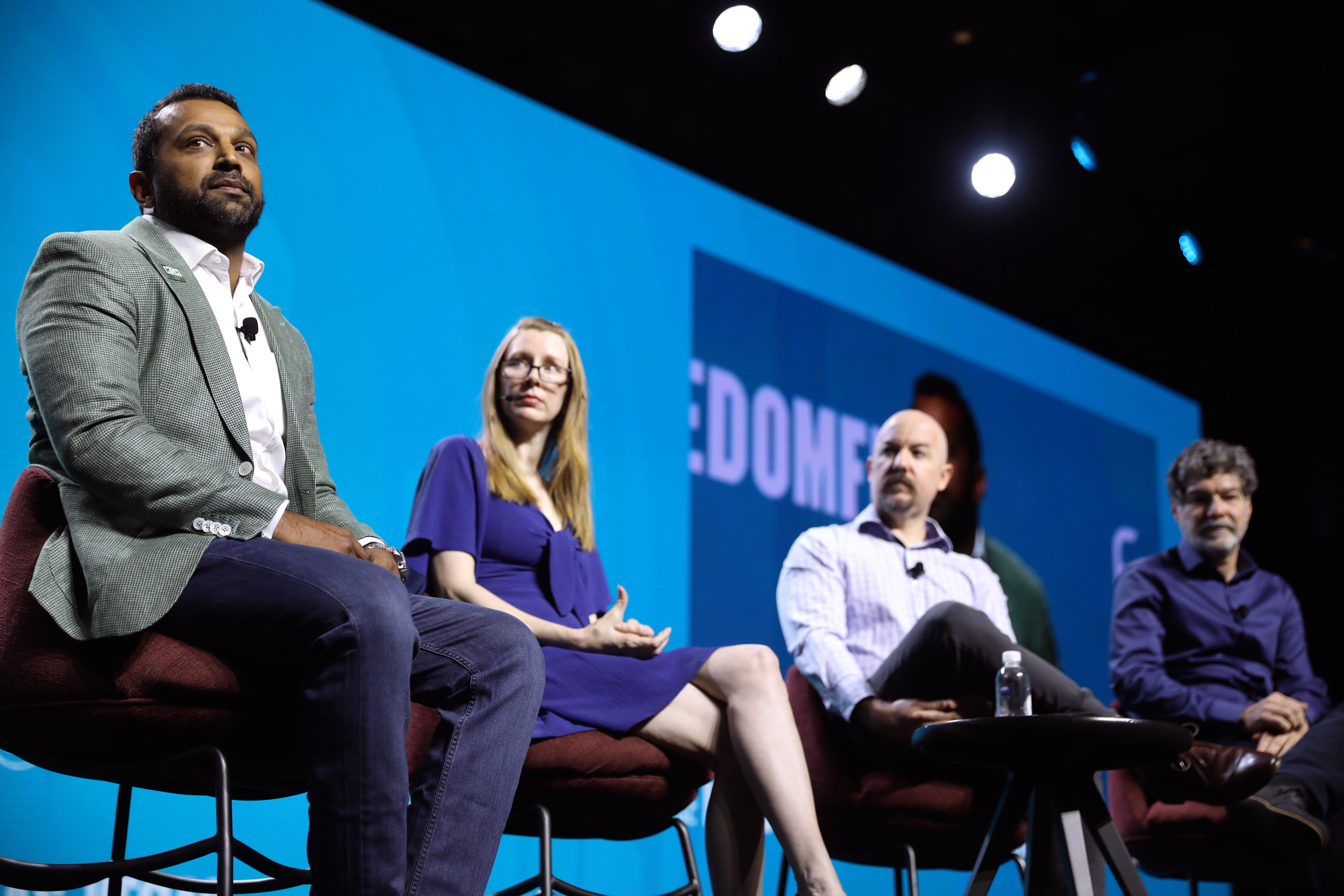
Kash Patel, Angela McArdle, Clint Russell, and Bret Weinstein at FreedomFest 2024

On December 3, 2022, McArdle became the first known National Chair in the United States who has given birth during her tenure.

McArdle was openly critical of Joe Exotic's short-lived campaign in the 2024 Libertarian Party presidential primaries.

In February 2023, McArdle spoke at the Rage Against the War Machine Rally, co-hosted with the People's Party, where she called on a cut to all aid to Ukraine, and for Ukraine to surrender all of its Russian-occupied territories. In June, McArdle also wrote an op-ed for Newsweek arguing that Russian forces were not committing a genocide in Ukraine.

McArdle endorsed Libertarian nominee Chase Oliver in the 2024 United States presidential election as a vehicle for Donald Trump's victory. She said that Oliver would take more votes from the Democratic nominee, and that it would be challenging to get libertarians and right of center independents to vote for him, so it would make the most sense to make Oliver a spoiler candidate for the Democrats.

Under her tenure as LNC Chair, McArdle was claimed to have played a key role in leveraging the Libertarian Party's spoiler effect into securing a pardon for Ross Ulbricht by Donald Trump, something McArdle herself denies, instead arguing that Trump had a signed pardon ready to go from 2020 that he was foiled from delivering by disloyal underlings.

==== "Joint fundraiser" dispute ====
In mid-July 2024, McArdle entered a heated dispute with Caryn Ann Harlos, the National Secretary of the Libertarian Party, due to McArdle approving a "joint fundraiser" with Robert F. Kennedy Jr.'s campaign. Harlos argued that the vote to approve the joint fundraiser did not pass the threshold specified in LP bylaws, and that by forcing it through regardless McArdle violated even more bylaws and exceeded her power as chairwoman. Harlos then petitioned the Libertarian Party's judicial committee, with the signatures of 188 of the 2024 delegates, arguing that McArdle violated bylaws Articles 2, (Note: The Party is organized to implement and give voice to the principles embodied in the Statement of Principles by: 1. functioning as a libertarian political entity separate and distinct from all other political parties or movements; 2. electing Libertarians to public office to move public policy in a libertarian direction; 3. chartering affiliate parties throughout the United States and promoting their growth and activities; 4. nominating candidates for President and Vice-President of the United States, and supporting Party and affiliate party candidates for political office; and 5. entering into public information activities.) 3.1, (Note: The Statement of Principles affirms that philosophy upon which the Libertarian Party is founded, by which it shall be sustained, and through which liberty shall prevail. The enduring importance of the Statement of Principles requires that it may be amended only by a vote of 7/8 of all registered delegates at a regular convention.) 14.1, (Note: Nominations of candidates for President and Vice-President of the United States may be made only at the regular convention immediately preceding a Presidential election.) 14.3, (Note: In the event of the death, resignation, disqualification, or suspension of the nomination of the Party's nominee for President, the Vice-Presidential nominee shall become the Presidential nominee. Two-thirds of the entire membership of the National Committee may, at a meeting, fill a Vice-Presidential vacancy, and, if necessary, a simultaneous Presidential vacancy.) and 14.4. (Note: The National Committee shall respect the vote of the delegates at nominating conventions and provide full support for the Party’s nominee for President and nominee for Vice-President as long as their campaigns are conducted in accordance with the platform of the Party.) Harlos additionally argued that efforts by the Colorado Libertarian Party to name Robert F. Kennedy Jr. as their nominee instead of the nominated Libertarian candidate, Chase Oliver, as proof McArdle is working with the Kennedy campaign against the libertarian party's own candidate. Todd Hagopian, the former party treasurer, also filed an amicus brief in support of Harlos arguing that McArdle's cooperation with the Kennedy campaign is sabotaging Chase Oliver's campaign. Hagopian also argued that McArdle illegally made the meeting to approve the Kennedy fundraiser as an "emergency" meeting to bypass receiving the required number of votes of libertarian delegates.

Harlos would then move to put the fundraiser on hold until the Judicial Committee reaches a verdict, with McArdle quickly blocking the motion, stating that Harlos was "dilatory and out of order." Harlos responded saying that her motion wasn't dilatory, since it would only hold the fundraiser's approval if the vote passes, to which McArdle again called Harlos as "dilatory and unprofessional" and asked her to rescind her judicial case and her motion to delay. On July 20 the LNC executive met for a vote on blocking the fundraiser with the executive committee voted 6 in favor and 11 against, meaning that the joint fundraiser would go through, although, due to the speedy nature of the called vote, many of the voting members did not read the contents of the proposed fundraiser. Later that day, Kennedy announced on Twitter that his campaign has signed the joint fundraiser, and that it was now in effect. On July 27, Harlos sued the Colorado affiliate, and their chairwoman Hannah Goodman, for their support of Kennedy in response McArdle called an emergency session of the executive committee on July 30. This meeting opened with McArdle attempting to transition the meeting to an executive session, so that McArdle would have more power over votes, in a 3–3 tie this motion failed. McArdle began by arguing that the LNC cannot indemnify Harlos due to her lawsuit and for acting outside "your bylaws-mandated duties" due to being in conflict with the LNC as such she should be removed from her position. In response Harlos stated she was not in conflict with the LNC, only the Colorado affiliate, and as such the executive committee had no means to remove her and as such no motion to remove was put forward.

On July 31 Harlos' appeal to the judicial committee took place reviewing if McArdle violated the aforementioned by-laws. During which committee chairman, Blay Tarnoff, ruled that article 2 was "a preparation, not a strict bylaw", however, also stated that the joint fundraiser was improper and asked why the LNC rushed to vote through a motion they had never seen, to which McArdle responded "We were in a hurry." Tarnoff closed the meeting by stating that the LNC should withdraw from the agreement.

On October 1 Harlos filed a lawsuit seeking to remove McArdle from office for alleged misconduct in her duties as chair, including inviting another political party's presidential candidate to hold a rally at the Libertarian Party's own presidential nominating convention, supporting candidates of a competing party, using party resources for non-party events without internal accounting, and self-dealing.

==== Formal investigation and resignation ====
On January 23, 2025, four LNC members moved to form a committee "to investigate allegations of misconduct by our Chair". The following day, McArdle announced her intention to resign as LNC Chair, citing new opportunities in the second Trump administration, likely under Robert F. Kennedy Jr. in the Department of Health and Human Services. She continued as chair until her successor was elected in a special election on February 2. On June 9, the Investigatory Committee submitted its final report to the LNC. The report found gross fiduciary violations on McArdle's part, including paying her partner ~$49,600 through a shell PAC (Freedom Calls LLC) without board approval, and for personally receiving ~$32,000 from the “Kennedy Victory Fund" without disclosing it, and for using party resources to promote the “Rescue the Republic” rally which was hosted by another non-profit she founded, effectively pocketing that money too. The report concluded that McArdle is “unfit to serve on the Libertarian National Committee, as an affiliate leader or as a candidate representing the Libertarian Party.”

=== Mises Caucus Chair ===
On June 2, 2025, McArdle announced that she had stepped in as the new Chair of the Mises Caucus.

In September 2026, McArdle appeared to take credit for the unauthorized appearance of branding from the 2024 Libertarian National Convention during a speech by Ross Ulbricht at the Republican Party's midterm convention.

== Electoral history ==
California's 34th congressional district special primary, 2017
Party	Candidate	Votes	%
Democratic	Jimmy Gomez	10,728	25.5
Democratic	Robert Lee Ahn	9,415	22.2
Democratic	Maria Cabildo	4,259	10.1
Democratic	Sara Hernandez	2,358	5.6
Democratic	Arturo Carmona	2,205	5.2
Democratic	Wendy Carrillo	2,195	5.2
Green	Kenneth Mejia	1,964	4.6
Democratic	Yolie Flores	1,368	3.2
Republican	William Morrison	1,360	3.2
Democratic	Tracy Van Houten	1,042	2.5
Democratic	Alejandra Campoverdi	1,001	2.4
Democratic	Vanessa Aramayo	853	2.0
Democratic	Sandra Mendoza	674	1.6
Democratic	Steven Mac	663	1.6
Democratic	Raymond Meza	509	1.2
No party preference	Mark Edward Padilla	427	1.0
Democratic	Ricardo De La Fuente	331	0.8
Libertarian	Angela McArdle	319	0.7
Democratic	Adrienne Nicole Edwards	182	0.4
Democratic	Richard Joseph Sullivan	155	0.4
Democratic	Armando Sotomayor	118	0.3
Democratic	Tenaya Wallace	103	0.2
Democratic	Melissa "Sharkie" Garza	79	0.2
Democratic	Michelle Walker (write-in)	0	nil
Total votes		42,308	100

California's 34th congressional district election, 2018
Primary election
Party	Candidate	Votes	%
Democratic	Jimmy Gomez (incumbent)	54,661	78.7
Green	Kenneth Mejia	8,987	12.9
Libertarian	Angela Elise McArdle	5,804	8.4

2022 Libertarian National Committee chair election
Candidate	First Ballot	%
Angela McArdle	692	69.6
Steve Dasbach	151	15.2
Tony D'Orazio	103	10.4
NOTA	47	4.7
Adam Kokesh (write-in)	1	nil
Tiffany Deleon (write-in)	1	nil
Totals	995	100%

== See also ==
- List of American libertarians
