= Libertarian National Committee =

Top institution of the U.S. Libertarian Party

- Libertarian Party Logo
- Founded: December 11, 1971; 54 years ago
- Location(s): 1321 Upland Drive Houston, Texas, U.S.
- Key people: Evan McMahon (Chair); Amanda Griffiths (Vice Chair); Jonathan McGee (Secretary); Doug Knebel (Treasurer)
- Website: lp.org

The Libertarian National Committee (LNC) controls and manages the affairs, properties, and funds of the United States Libertarian Party. It is composed of the party officers, five at-large representatives elected every two years at the national convention, and a theoretical maximum of 10 regional representatives. The current chair is Evan McMahon.

The LNC has lobbied or filed lawsuits against laws and regulations that restrict contributions to parties and candidates.

== Current members ==
=== At-large members ===
Travis Bos
Robert Vinson
Andrew Watkins
Kathy Yeniscavich
Adrian F Malagon

=== Regional representatives ===
Region	Representatives	Alternate representatives
1	Aron Lam	Andrew Chadderdon
2	Johnathan McGee	Matt Johnson
3	Dustin Nanna; Keith Thompson	Greg Hertzsch; Jessi Cowart
4	Meredith Hays	Mimi Robson
5	Otto Dassing	Paul Bracco
6	Pat Ford	Ben Weir

== List of LNC chairs ==
#	Image	Chairperson	Term	State
1		David Nolan	1971–1972	Colorado
2		Susan Nolan	1972–1974	Colorado
3		Ed Crane	1974–1977	California
4		David Bergland	1977–1981	California
5		Alicia Clark	1981–1983	California
6		Paul Grant	1983–1985	Colorado
7		Randy VerHagen	1985	Wisconsin
8		Jim Turney	1985–1988	Virginia
9		Dave Walter	1988–1991	Pennsylvania
10		Mary Gingell	1991–1993	California
11		Steve Dasbach	1993–1998	Indiana
12		David Bergland	1998–2000	California
13		Jim Lark	2000–2002	Virginia
14		Geoff Neale	2002–2004	Texas
15		Michael Dixon	2004–2006	Illinois
16		Bill Redpath	2006–2010	Virginia
17		Mark Hinkle	2010–2012	California
18		Geoff Neale	2012–2014	Texas
19		Nicholas Sarwark	2014–2020	New Hampshire
20		Joe Bishop-Henchman	2020–2021	District of Columbia
–		Ken Moellman (acting)	June–July 2021	Kentucky
21		Whitney Bilyeu	2021–2022	Texas
22		Angela McArdle	2022–2025	California
23		Steven Nekhaila	2025–2026	Florida
24		Evan McMahon	2026–present	Indiana

== Other committees ==
Judicial Committee
Name	Role
Stephan Kinsella	Member
Mike Seebeck	Member
Ken Krawchuk	Member
Marc Montoni	Member
Rob Stratton	Member
Blay Tarnoff	Member
Rob Latham	Member

== See also ==
- Democratic National Committee
- Green National Committee
- Republican National Committee
- List of state parties of the Libertarian Party (United States)
