= 2024 Iowa Libertarian presidential caucuses =

- January 15, 2024
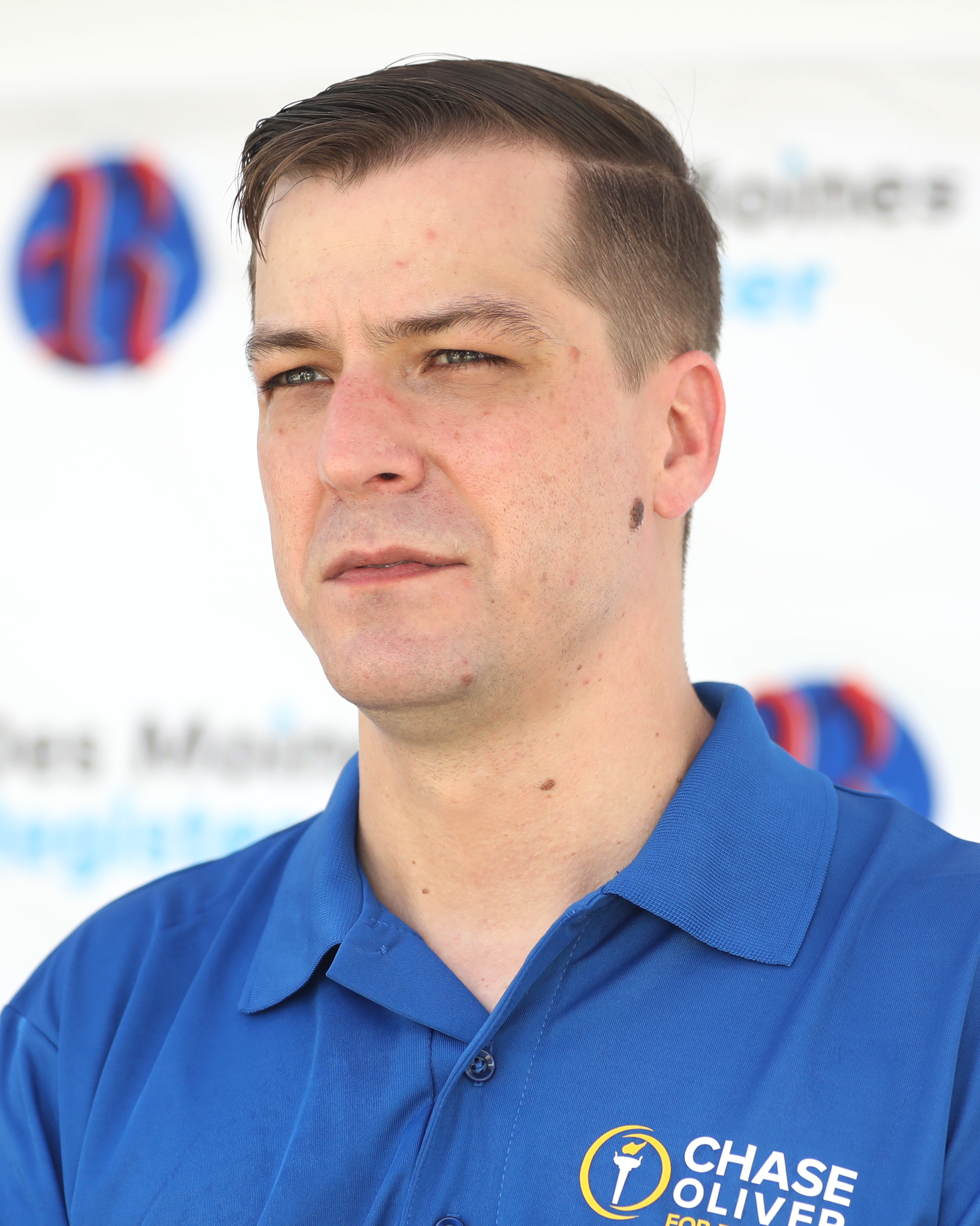

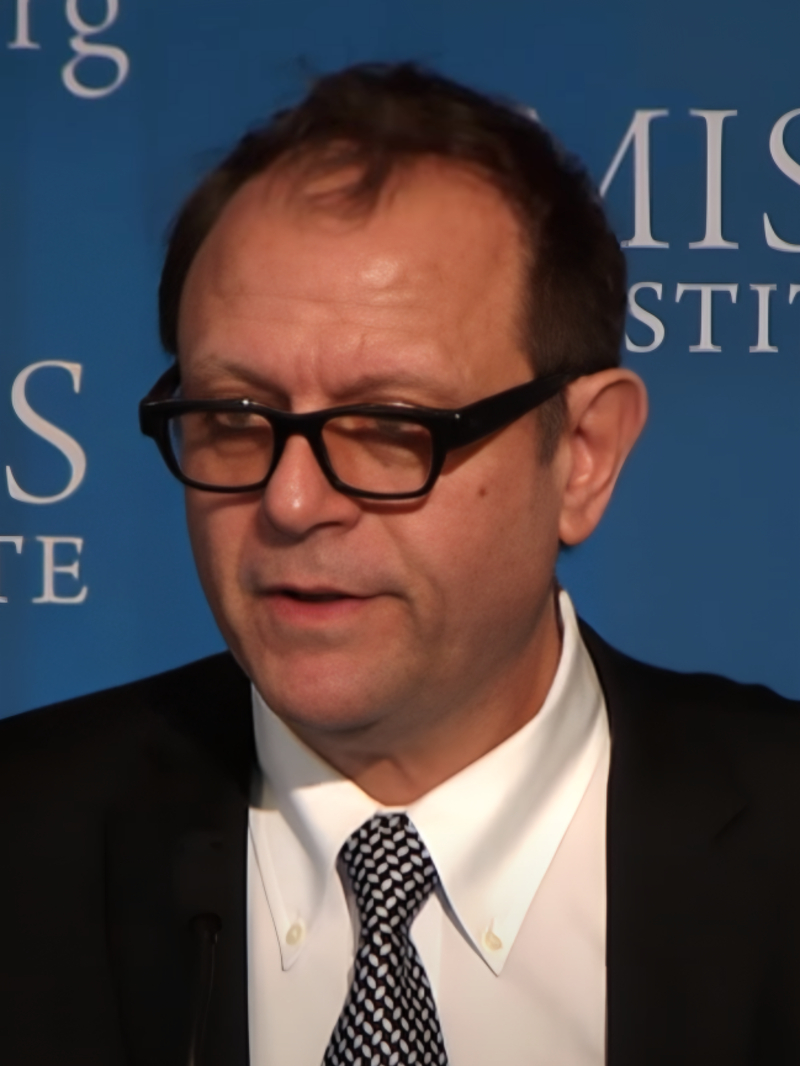

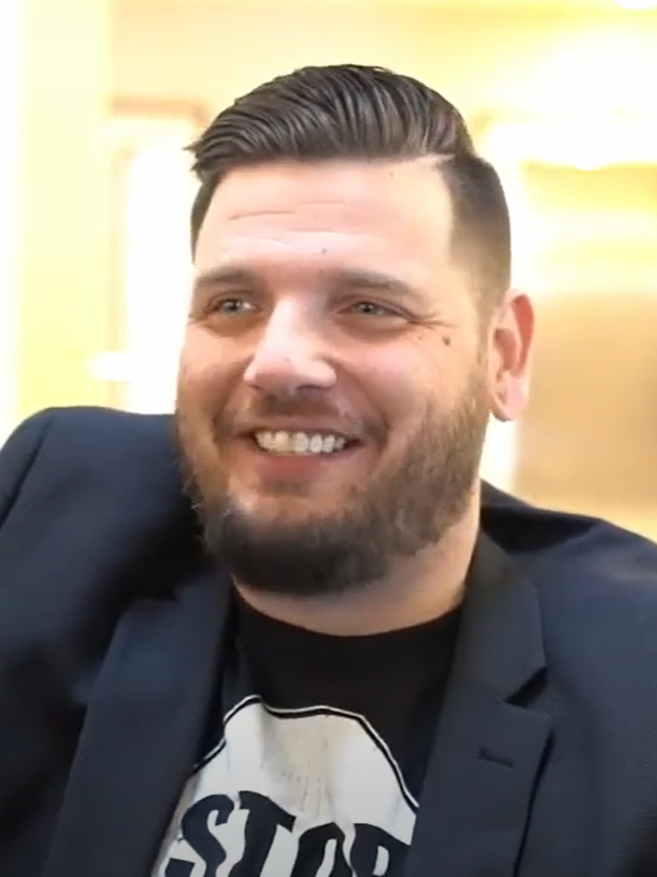
Candidate	Chase Oliver	Michael Rectenwald
Home state	Georgia	Pennsylvania
Percentage	42.7%	16.9%
Candidate	Mike ter Maat	Joshua Smith
Home state	Florida	Iowa
Percentage	13.5%	13.5%

The 2024 Iowa Libertarian presidential caucuses were held on January 15, 2024, as part of the 2024 Libertarian primaries for the 2024 presidential election.

2022 U.S. Senate candidate Chase Oliver from Georgia won the non-binding preferential vote with 42.7% of the vote, however, he only received 38 votes.

== Candidates ==
Candidates were not required to qualify for the ballot. The following candidates received votes:

- Charles Ballay
- Chase Oliver
- Lars Mapstead
- Jacob Hornberger
- Joshua Smith
- Michael Rectenwald
- Mike ter Maat
- Vivek Ramaswamy (not a candidate; running as a Republican)
- Robert Sansone
- Mario Perales
- Art Olivier

== Results ==
2024 Iowa Libertarian presidential caucuses
Candidate	Votes	Percentage
Chase Oliver	38	42.70
Michael Rectenwald	15	16.85
Mike ter Maat	12	13.48
Joshua Smith	12	13.48
Vivek Ramaswamy	4	4.49
Mario Perales	2	2.25
Robert Sansone	2	2.25
Jacob Hornberger	1	1.12
Lars Mapstead	1	1.12
Art Olivier	1	1.12
None of the above	1	1.12
Total	89	100.00

== See also ==
- 2024 Iowa Republican presidential caucuses
- 2024 United States presidential election
- 2024 United States presidential election in Iowa
- 2024 Libertarian Party presidential primaries
- 2024 United States elections
- 2024 Iowa Democratic presidential caucuses
