= 2024 United States presidential election in Iowa =

- November 5, 2024
- Turnout: 74.18% (▼1.59 pp)

Nominee	Donald Trump	Kamala Harris
Party	Republican	Democratic
Home state	Florida	California
Running mate	JD Vance	Tim Walz
Electoral vote	6	0
Popular vote	927,019	707,278
Percentage	55.73%	42.52%

Trump
40–50%
50–60%
60–70%
70–80%
80–90%
90–100%
Harris
40–50%
50–60%
60–70%
70–80%
80–90%
President before election
Joe Biden
Democratic
Elected President
Donald Trump
Republican

The 2024 United States presidential election in Iowa was held on Tuesday, November 5, 2024, as part of the 2024 United States presidential election in which all 50 states plus the District of Columbia participated. Iowa voters chose electors to represent them in the Electoral College via a popular vote. The state of Iowa has six electoral votes in the Electoral College, following reapportionment due to the 2020 United States census in which the state neither gained nor lost a seat.

For most of the race, Iowa was expected to be a safe red state, though a poll performed by Selzer and Co. and published by The Des Moines Register on November 2 claimed Harris to be up by 3%, leading some to predict a far closer race than initially expected. Nonetheless, Democrats did not seriously contest the state.

In the election, Donald Trump won the state in a landslide, winning the state by 13.2 percentage points, the widest margin for any candidate since 1972. This was the first time a Republican won the state by double digits since 1980, and the first time any presidential nominee had done so since 1996.

== Caucuses ==
=== Democratic caucuses ===
During the Iowa Democratic caucuses, in-person caucusing focusing only on party business was held on January 15. Voting on candidates was done exclusively via mail-in ballots from January 12 until Super Tuesday, March 5, 2024. This was the result of a compromise between the Iowa Democratic Party and the Democratic National Committee (DNC). Iowa traditionally holds its race first during the presidential primary and caucuses season, but the DNC originally wanted South Carolina to instead hold its race first on February 3.

2024 Iowa Democratic pres. caucuses
Candidate	Votes	%	Delegates
Joe Biden (incumbent)	12,337	90.26	40
Dean Phillips	394	2.88	0
Marianne Williamson (Note: While voting was ongoing, Williamson suspended and then unsuspended her campaign.)	307	2.25	0
Uncommitted	614	4.49	0
Over and under votes	17	0.12	—
Total	13,669	100%	40

=== Republican caucuses ===
The Iowa Republican caucuses were held on January 15, 2024, the first-in-the-nation nomination contest of the 2024 Republican primaries. Former president Donald Trump won the primary with the largest margin of victory for a non-incumbent in the Iowa caucuses. Trump's overwhelming victory in the state established his position early as the frontrunner.

Popular vote share by county Trump: 30–40%; 40–50%; 50–60%; 60–70%; 70–80%; Haley: 30–40%

Iowa Republican precinct caucuses, January 15, 2024
Candidate	Votes	Percentage	Actual delegate count		
Candidate	Votes	Percentage	Bound	Unbound	Total
Donald Trump	56,243	51.00%	20	0	20
Ron DeSantis	23,491	21.30%	9	0	9
Nikki Haley	21,027	19.07%	8	0	8
Vivek Ramaswamy	8,430	7.64%	3	0	3
Ryan Binkley	768	0.70%	0	0	0
Asa Hutchinson	188	0.17%	0	0	0
Other	90	0.08%	0	0	0
Chris Christie (withdrawn)	35	0.03%	0	0	0
Total:	110,272	100.00%	40	0	40

=== Libertarian caucuses ===
The Iowa Libertarian caucuses were held on January 15, 2024, its first as a recognized party in the state. 2022 U.S. Senate candidate Chase Oliver from Georgia won the non-binding preferential vote with 42.7% of the vote.

2024 Iowa Libertarian presidential caucuses
Candidate	Votes	Percentage
Chase Oliver	38	42.70
Michael Rectenwald	15	16.85
Mike ter Maat	12	13.48
Joshua Smith	12	13.48
Vivek Ramaswamy	4	4.49
Mario Perales	2	2.25
Robert Sansone	2	2.25
Jacob Hornberger	1	1.12
Lars Mapstead	1	1.12
Art Olivier	1	1.12
None of the above	1	1.12
Total	89	100.00

== General election ==
=== Predictions ===
Source	Ranking	As of
The Cook Political Report	Likely R	November 4, 2024
Inside Elections	Tilt R	November 4, 2024
Sabato's Crystal Ball	Likely R	November 4, 2024
Decision Desk HQ/The Hill	Likely R	November 3, 2024
CNalysis	Tilt R	November 4, 2024
CNN	Solid R	November 3, 2024
The Economist	Safe R	November 3, 2024
538	Likely R	November 3, 2024
NBC News	Solid R	November 3, 2024
Split Ticket	Lean R	November 2, 2024

=== Polling ===
Donald Trump vs. Kamala Harris

Aggregate polls

Source of poll aggregation	Dates administered	Dates updated	Kamala Harris Democratic	Donald Trump Republican	Other / Undecided (Note: Calculated by taking the difference of 100% and all other candidates combined.)	Margin
270ToWin	October 2 – November 4, 2024	November 4, 2024	45.3%	50.0%	4.7%	Trump +4.7%
Silver Bulletin	through November 3, 2024	November 4, 2024	45.4%	49.8%	4.8%	Trump +4.4%
Average			45.4%	49.9%	4.7%	Trump +4.5%

Poll source	Date(s) administered	Sample size (Note: Key: A – all adults RV – registered voters LV – likely voters V – unclear)	Margin of error	Donald Trump Republican	Kamala Harris Democratic	Other / Undecided
InsiderAdvantage (R)	November 2–3, 2024	800 (LV)	± 3.5%	52%	46%	2% (Note: "Other" with 1%)
SoCal Strategies (R) (Note: Poll sponsored by On Point Politics & Red Eagle Politics)	November 2–3, 2024	501 (RV)	± 4.4%	50%	43%	7%
SoCal Strategies (R)	November 2–3, 2024	435 (LV)	± 4.4%	52%	44%	4%
Emerson College (Note: Poll sponsored by RealClearDefense)	November 1–2, 2024	800 (LV)	± 3.4%	53%	43%	4% (Note: "Someone else" with 1%)
Emerson College	November 1–2, 2024	800 (LV)	± 3.4%	54% (Note: With voters who lean towards a given candidate)	45%	1%
Cygnal (R) (Note: Poll sponsored by the Iowans for Tax Relief Foundation)	September 27–28, 2024	600 (LV)	± 4.0%	51%	45%	4%

Donald Trump vs. Kamala Harris vs. Robert F. Kennedy Jr. vs. Chase Oliver

Poll source	Date(s) administered	Sample size	Margin of error	Donald Trump Republican	Kamala Harris Democratic	Robert F. Kennedy Jr. Independent	Chase Oliver Libertarian	Other / Undecided
Selzer & Co. (Note: Poll sponsored by the Des Moines Register & Mediacom Iowa)	October 28–31, 2024	808 (LV)	± 3.4%	44%	47%	3%	0%	6% (Note: "Not sure" with 3%; "Don't want to say" with 2%; "Someone else" with 1%; "Would not vote" with 0%)
Selzer & Co.	September 8–11, 2024	656 (LV)	± 3.8%	47%	43%	6%	1%	3%

Hypothetical polling with Donald Trump and Joe Biden

Donald Trump vs. Joe Biden

Poll source	Date(s) administered	Sample size	Margin of error	Donald Trump Republican	Joe Biden Democratic	Other / Undecided
Cygnal (R)	July 8–9, 2024	600 (LV)	± 4.0%	51%	39%	10%
John Zogby Strategies (Note: Poll conducted for Kennedy's campaign)	April 13–21, 2024	405 (LV)	–	47%	45%	8%
Selzer & Co.	February 25–28, 2024	640 (LV)	± 3.9%	48%	33%	19% (Note: "Someone else" with 15%)
Cygnal (R)	February 13–14, 2024	600 (LV)	± 3.9%	49%	40%	11%
John Zogby Strategies	January 2–4, 2024	500 (LV)	–	51%	39%	10%
Emerson College	December 15–17, 2023	1,094 (RV)	± 2.9%	48%	40%	12%
Emerson College	October 1–4, 2023	464 (RV)	± 4.5%	44%	34%	22%
Cygnal (R)	September 28–29, 2023	506 (LV)	± 4.3%	47%	38%	15%
Emerson College	September 7–9, 2023	896 (RV)	± 3.2%	50%	39%	11%
HarrisX (Note: Poll conducted for American Free Enterprise Chamber of Commerce)	August 17–21, 2023	1,952 (LV)	–	47%	41%	12%
Big Data Poll (R)	July 9–12, 2023	1,057 (LV)	± 3.0%	42%	36%	22%
Emerson College	May 19–22, 2023	1,064 (RV)	± 2.9%	49%	38%	13%
Cygnal (R)	April 3–4, 2023	600 (LV)	± 4.0%	46%	40%	14%
Emerson College	October 2–4, 2022	959 (LV)	± 3.1%	47%	39%	14%
Cygnal (R)	October 2–4, 2022	600 (LV)	± 4.0%	51%	41%	8%
Cygnal (R)	July 13–14, 2022	600 (LV)	± 4.0%	51%	40%	9%
Cygnal (R)	February 20–22, 2022	610 (LV)	± 3.9%	53%	38%	9%
Selzer & Co.	November 7–10, 2021	658 (LV)	± 3.8%	51%	40%	9%
Cygnal (R)	October 18–19, 2021	600 (LV)	± 4.0%	54%	41%	5%

Donald Trump vs. Joe Biden vs. Robert F. Kennedy Jr. vs. Chase Oliver

Poll source	Date(s) administered	Sample size	Margin of error	Donald Trump Republican	Joe Biden Democratic	Robert F. Kennedy Jr. Independent	Chase Oliver Libertarian	Other / Undecided
Selzer & Co.	June 9–14, 2024	632 (LV)	± 3.9%	50%	32%	9%	2%	7% (Note: "Someone else" with 3%, "would not vote" with 1%)

Donald Trump vs. Joe Biden vs. Cornel West

Poll source	Date(s) administered	Sample size	Margin of error	Donald Trump Republican	Joe Biden Democratic	Cornel West Green	Other / Undecided
Emerson College	September 7–9, 2023	896 (RV)	± 3.2%	48%	35%	5%	12%

Hypothetical polling with other candidates

Donald Trump vs. Gavin Newsom

Poll source	Date(s) administered	Sample size	Margin of error	Donald Trump Republican	Gavin Newsom Democratic	Other / Undecided
Cygnal (R)	September 28–29, 2023	506 (LV)	± 4.3%	48%	34%	18%

Donald Trump vs. Robert F. Kennedy Jr.

Poll source	Date(s) administered	Sample size	Margin of error	Donald Trump Republican	Robert Kennedy Jr. Independent	Other / Undecided
John Zogby Strategies	April 13–21, 2024	405 (LV)	–	39%	45%	16%

Robert F. Kennedy Jr. vs. Joe Biden

Poll source	Date(s) administered	Sample size	Margin of error	Robert Kennedy Jr. Independent	Joe Biden Democratic	Other / Undecided
John Zogby Strategies	April 13–21, 2024	405 (LV)	–	50%	39%	11%

Ron DeSantis vs. Joe Biden

Poll source	Date(s) administered	Sample size	Margin of error	Ron DeSantis Republican	Joe Biden Democratic	Other / Undecided
Big Data Poll (R)	July 9–12, 2023	1,057 (LV)	± 3.0%	38%	36%	26%
Emerson College	May 19–22, 2023	1,064 (RV)	± 2.9%	45%	38%	17%
Cygnal (R)	April 3–4, 2023	600 (LV)	± 4.0%	48%	38%	14%

Generic Republican vs. Joe Biden

Poll source	Date(s) administered	Sample size	Margin of error	Generic Republican	Joe Biden Democratic	Other / Undecided
Cygnal (R)	September 28–29, 2023	506 (LV)	± 4.3%	49%	33%	18%

=== Results ===
State House district results: Trump 40–50% 50–60% 60–70% 70–80% 80–90% / Harris 40–50% 50–60% 60–70% 70–80%

Township results: Trump 40–50% 50–60% 60–70% 70–80% 80–90% 90–100% / Harris 40–50% 50–60% 60–70% 70–80%

2024 United States presidential election in Iowa
Party	Candidate	Votes	%	±%
Republican	Donald Trump; JD Vance	927,019	55.73%	+2.64%
Democratic	Kamala Harris; Tim Walz	707,278	42.52%	−2.37%
We the People	Robert F. Kennedy Jr. (withdrawn); Nicole Shanahan (withdrawn)	13,122	0.79%	N/A
Libertarian	Chase Oliver; Mike ter Maat	7,218	0.43%	−0.73%
Socialism and Liberation	Claudia De la Cruz; Karina Garcia	1,427	0.09%	N/A
Independent	Shiva Ayyadurai; Crystal Ellis	424	0.03%	N/A
Socialist	Bill Stodden; Stephanie Cholensky	361	0.02%	N/A
Write-in		6,657	0.40%	+0.02%
Total votes		1,663,506	100.00%	N/A

==== By county ====
County	Donald Trump Republican		Kamala Harris Democratic		Various candidates Other parties		Margin		Total
County	#	%	#	%	#	%	#	%	Total
Adair	2,916	71.47%	1,086	26.62%	78	1.91%	1,830	44.85%	4,080
Adams	1,517	71.05%	576	26.98%	42	1.97%	941	44.07%	2,135
Allamakee	4,857	66.37%	2,350	32.11%	111	1.52%	2,507	34.26%	7,318
Appanoose	4,704	72.55%	1,686	26.00%	94	1.45%	3,018	46.55%	6,484
Audubon	2,214	68.14%	970	29.86%	65	2.00%	1,244	38.28%	3,249
Benton	9,549	65.81%	4,739	32.66%	221	1.52%	4,810	33.15%	14,509
Black Hawk	30,572	48.60%	31,299	49.76%	1,035	1.65%	-727	-1.16%	62,906
Boone	9,199	59.72%	5,895	38.27%	309	2.01%	3,304	21.45%	15,403
Bremer	8,799	60.24%	5,571	38.14%	237	1.62%	3,228	22.10%	14,607
Buchanan	6,790	63.16%	3,766	35.03%	194	1.80%	3,024	28.13%	10,750
Buena Vista	4,962	65.84%	2,462	32.67%	113	1.50%	2,500	33.17%	7,537
Butler	5,784	71.89%	2,144	26.65%	118	1.47%	3,640	45.24%	8,046
Calhoun	3,708	72.75%	1,328	26.05%	61	1.20%	2,380	46.70%	5,097
Carroll	7,814	70.14%	3,153	28.30%	173	1.55%	4,661	41.84%	11,140
Cass	5,007	69.38%	2,077	28.78%	133	1.84%	2,930	40.60%	7,217
Cedar	6,390	60.03%	4,075	38.28%	179	1.68%	2,315	21.75%	10,644
Cerro Gordo	12,627	54.85%	9,955	43.25%	438	1.90%	2,672	11.60%	23,020
Cherokee	4,398	72.04%	1,611	26.39%	96	1.57%	2,787	45.65%	6,105
Chickasaw	4,234	67.86%	1,919	30.76%	86	1.38%	2,315	37.10%	6,239
Clarke	3,140	70.10%	1,265	28.24%	74	1.65%	1,875	41.86%	4,479
Clay	6,047	70.80%	2,367	27.71%	127	1.49%	3,680	43.09%	8,541
Clayton	6,255	66.54%	3,017	32.10%	128	1.36%	3,238	34.44%	9,400
Clinton	13,964	58.48%	9,472	39.67%	442	1.85%	4,492	18.81%	23,878
Crawford	4,651	71.06%	1,812	27.69%	82	1.25%	2,839	43.37%	6,545
Dallas	32,374	51.42%	29,402	46.70%	1,185	1.88%	2,972	4.72%	62,961
Davis	3,027	76.56%	878	22.21%	49	1.24%	2,149	54.35%	3,954
Decatur	2,711	72.51%	957	25.60%	71	1.90%	1,754	46.91%	3,739
Delaware	6,984	68.89%	2,978	29.37%	176	1.74%	4,006	39.52%	10,138
Des Moines	10,794	56.65%	7,935	41.64%	325	1.71%	2,859	15.01%	19,054
Dickinson	7,775	69.21%	3,297	29.35%	162	1.44%	4,478	39.86%	11,234
Dubuque	28,224	53.48%	23,705	44.92%	841	1.59%	4,519	8.56%	52,770
Emmet	3,422	71.32%	1,315	27.41%	61	1.27%	2,107	43.91%	4,798
Fayette	6,325	64.23%	3,334	33.85%	189	1.92%	2,991	30.38%	9,848
Floyd	4,744	62.01%	2,782	36.37%	124	1.62%	1,962	25.64%	7,650
Franklin	3,431	70.02%	1,393	28.43%	76	1.55%	2,038	41.59%	4,900
Fremont	2,711	71.44%	1,023	26.96%	61	1.61%	1,688	44.48%	3,795
Greene	3,211	65.79%	1,603	32.84%	67	1.37%	1,608	32.95%	4,881
Grundy	4,998	69.94%	2,019	28.25%	129	1.81%	2,979	41.69%	7,146
Guthrie	4,446	67.95%	1,974	30.17%	123	1.88%	2,472	37.78%	6,543
Hamilton	5,004	65.87%	2,482	32.67%	111	1.46%	2,522	33.20%	7,597
Hancock	4,336	73.01%	1,523	25.64%	80	1.35%	2,813	47.37%	5,939
Hardin	5,790	68.44%	2,553	30.18%	117	1.38%	3,237	38.26%	8,460
Harrison	5,566	69.93%	2,245	28.21%	148	1.86%	3,321	41.72%	7,959
Henry	6,439	67.07%	2,995	31.20%	166	1.73%	3,444	35.87%	9,600
Howard	3,157	65.09%	1,619	33.38%	74	1.53%	1,538	31.71%	4,850
Humboldt	3,770	74.17%	1,236	24.32%	77	1.51%	2,534	49.85%	5,083
Ida	2,771	75.81%	826	22.60%	58	1.59%	1,945	53.21%	3,655
Iowa	6,068	62.95%	3,400	35.27%	171	1.77%	2,668	27.68%	9,639
Jackson	7,074	65.49%	3,567	33.02%	160	1.48%	3,507	32.47%	10,801
Jasper	12,701	62.88%	7,141	35.35%	356	1.76%	5,560	27.53%	20,198
Jefferson	4,353	52.16%	3,788	45.39%	205	2.46%	565	6.77%	8,346
Johnson	26,087	30.11%	58,846	67.92%	1,711	1.97%	-32,759	-37.81%	86,644
Jones	6,820	62.11%	3,942	35.90%	218	1.99%	2,878	26.21%	10,980
Keokuk	3,869	75.13%	1,219	23.67%	62	1.20%	2,650	51.46%	5,150
Kossuth	5,983	71.25%	2,284	27.20%	130	1.55%	3,699	44.05%	8,397
Lee	10,152	62.67%	5,659	34.94%	387	2.39%	4,493	27.73%	16,198
Linn	54,237	44.11%	66,358	53.97%	2,364	1.92%	-12,121	-9.86%	122,959
Louisa	3,584	69.70%	1,480	28.78%	78	1.52%	2,104	40.92%	5,142
Lucas	3,400	73.18%	1,169	25.16%	77	1.66%	2,231	48.02%	4,646
Lyon	5,899	84.25%	1,023	14.61%	80	1.14%	4,876	69.64%	7,002
Madison	6,864	68.45%	3,008	30.00%	156	1.56%	3,856	38.45%	10,028
Mahaska	8,207	74.98%	2,577	23.54%	162	1.48%	5,630	51.44%	10,946
Marion	13,289	67.92%	5,928	30.30%	349	1.78%	7,361	37.62%	19,566
Marshall	9,815	56.83%	7,134	41.31%	321	1.86%	2,681	15.52%	17,270
Mills	5,671	68.71%	2,456	29.76%	126	1.53%	3,215	38.95%	8,253
Mitchell	3,736	64.74%	1,943	33.67%	92	1.59%	1,793	31.07%	5,771
Monona	3,331	71.84%	1,236	26.66%	70	1.51%	2,095	45.18%	4,637
Monroe	3,104	74.65%	1,002	24.10%	52	1.25%	2,102	50.55%	4,158
Montgomery	3,486	68.70%	1,508	29.72%	80	1.58%	1,978	38.98%	5,074
Muscatine	11,152	56.46%	8,212	41.58%	388	1.96%	2,940	14.88%	19,752
O'Brien	5,998	79.71%	1,428	18.98%	99	1.32%	4,570	60.73%	7,525
Osceola	2,623	81.23%	555	17.19%	51	1.58%	2,068	64.04%	3,229
Page	5,153	70.38%	2,060	28.13%	109	1.49%	3,093	42.25%	7,322
Palo Alto	3,576	71.78%	1,338	26.86%	68	1.36%	2,238	44.92%	4,982
Plymouth	10,661	76.31%	3,104	22.22%	206	1.47%	7,557	54.09%	13,971
Pocahontas	2,727	76.13%	796	22.22%	59	1.65%	1,931	53.91%	3,582
Polk	112,240	43.70%	140,075	54.54%	4,523	1.76%	-27,835	-10.84%	256,838
Pottawattamie	26,335	59.10%	17,468	39.20%	756	1.70%	8,867	19.90%	44,559
Poweshiek	5,758	57.51%	4,067	40.62%	188	1.88%	1,691	16.89%	10,013
Ringgold	2,015	75.02%	638	23.75%	33	1.23%	1,377	51.27%	2,686
Sac	4,100	75.09%	1,289	23.61%	71	1.30%	2,811	51.48%	5,460
Scott	45,976	51.01%	42,479	47.13%	1,678	1.86%	3,497	3.88%	90,133
Shelby	4,600	70.71%	1,811	27.84%	94	1.45%	2,789	42.87%	6,505
Sioux	16,053	84.49%	2,626	13.82%	322	1.69%	13,427	70.67%	19,001
Story	21,665	43.74%	26,765	54.04%	1,096	2.21%	-5,100	-10.30%	49,526
Tama	5,379	62.43%	3,070	35.63%	167	1.94%	2,309	26.80%	8,616
Taylor	2,381	77.28%	666	21.62%	34	1.10%	1,715	55.66%	3,081
Union	4,044	67.25%	1,874	31.17%	95	1.58%	2,170	36.08%	6,013
Van Buren	2,785	76.83%	778	21.46%	62	1.71%	2,007	55.37%	3,625
Wapello	9,479	65.00%	4,896	33.57%	208	1.43%	4,583	31.43%	14,583
Warren	19,486	59.40%	12,712	38.75%	606	1.85%	6,774	20.65%	32,804
Washington	7,119	61.43%	4,297	37.08%	172	1.48%	2,822	24.35%	11,588
Wayne	2,426	77.66%	643	20.58%	55	1.76%	1,783	57.08%	3,124
Webster	10,850	64.78%	5,641	33.68%	257	1.53%	5,209	31.10%	16,748
Winnebago	3,636	64.45%	1,909	33.84%	97	1.72%	1,727	30.61%	5,642
Winneshiek	6,427	53.65%	5,321	44.42%	231	1.93%	1,106	9.23%	11,979
Woodbury	25,969	60.50%	16,145	37.62%	807	1.88%	9,824	22.88%	42,921
Worth	2,715	63.33%	1,508	35.18%	64	1.49%	1,207	28.15%	4,287
Wright	3,853	67.32%	1,770	30.93%	100	1.75%	2,083	36.39%	5,723
Totals	927,019	55.73%	707,278	42.52%	29,209	1.76%	219,741	13.21%	1,663,506

Counties that flipped from Democratic to Republican

- Scott (largest city: Davenport)

==== By congressional district ====
Trump won all four congressional districts.

District	Trump	Harris	Representative
1st	53.29%	44.86%	Mariannette Miller-Meeks
2nd	54.11%	44.15%	Ashley Hinson
3rd	51.33%	46.94%	Zach Nunn
4th	64.83%	33.47%	Randy Feenstra

== Analysis ==
An Upper Midwestern state previously considered a battleground and a bellwether state for decades, Iowa voted significantly more Republican than the nation-at-large in both 2016 and 2020 and is now considered a moderately red state at the federal and state levels. Republican Donald Trump won the state by a comfortable margin of 8.2% while losing nationally in 2020, despite polls indicating a close race. Biden became the first Democrat to be elected president without winning Iowa since Jimmy Carter in 1976. Furthermore, during the 2022 midterms, all three statewide incumbent Republicans (Governor Kim Reynolds, Secretary of Agriculture Mike Naig, and Secretary of State Paul Pate) won reelection by more than 18%, two of three statewide incumbent Democrats (28-year incumbent Attorney General Tom Miller and 40-year incumbent Treasurer Michael Fitzgerald) lost to Republican challengers, and the remaining incumbent Democrat (four-year incumbent Auditor Rob Sand) won by fewer than 3,000 votes, or 0.24%. Republicans also won all four of Iowa's U.S. House seats.

Iowa handed Republican Donald Trump a decisive victory, doing so by a margin of 219,741 votes. This election marks the third consecutive cycle in which Iowa voted for the Republican candidate in a presidential election. Notably, Trump improved his margins in 98 of 99 counties and gained significant support across all demographics, performing better in suburban, rural, and urban areas. Trump became the first Republican to win Scott County since Ronald Reagan in 1984.

This is the first election since 1968 that Iowa voted to the right of Alaska, a state that only voted Democratic in 1964. Iowa and Florida also voted for Trump by over 13% in 2024 after having previously voted twice for Democrat Barack Obama.

== See also ==
- United States presidential elections in Iowa
- 2024 United States presidential election
- 2024 Democratic Party presidential primaries
- 2024 Republican Party presidential primaries
- 2024 United States elections

== Notes ==
Partisan clients
