= Mostov =

Mostov is a surname. Notable people with the surname include:

- Joanna Angel (1980), born Joanna Mostov, American actress, director, and writer
- Julie Mostov (fl. 1992), American political scientist
- Keith E. Mostov (born 1956), American biologist
