= Dave Smith (comedian) =

American political commentator (born 1983)

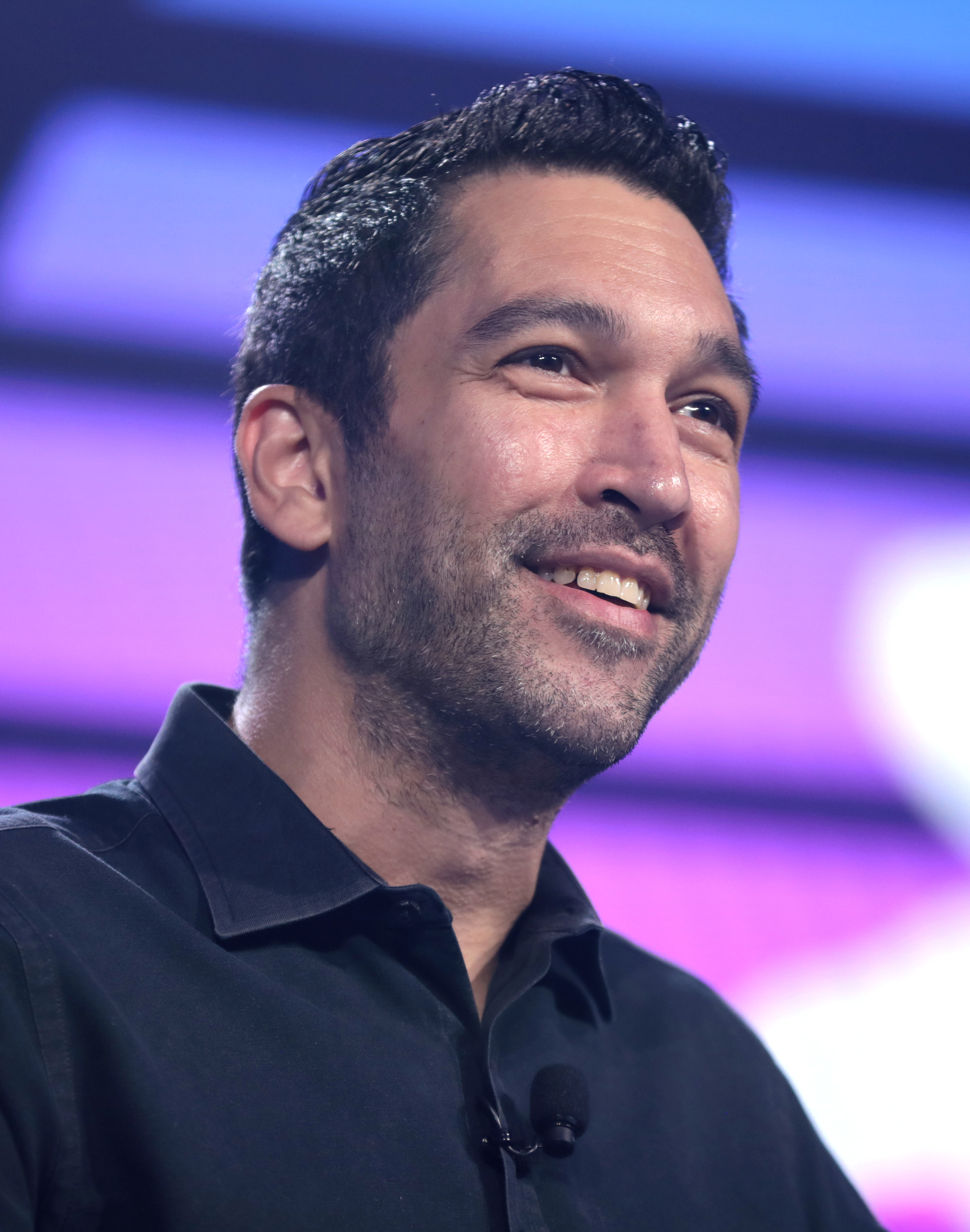
- Smith at 2022 Revolution hosted by Young Americans for Liberty
- Born: David Smith; April 20, 1983 (age 43); New York City, U.S.
- Occupations: Political commentator, comedian, podcaster
- Political party: Libertarian
- Other political affiliations: Mises Caucus
- Spouse: Lauren Smith
- Children: 2
- Website: comicdavesmith.com

David Smith (born April 20, 1983) is an American comedian, podcaster, and political commentator who hosts the libertarian podcast Part of the Problem.

Smith has frequently appeared on Fox News' Kennedy, The Greg Gutfeld Show, and CNN's S.E. Cupp: Unfiltered, and has also appeared on the Lex Fridman Podcast, among others. Smith is a member of the Mises Caucus of the Libertarian Party.

== Early life ==
Smith was raised in Brooklyn, New York City, by his single mother. Smith is Jewish. His maternal grandmother was a Holocaust survivor, and his grandfather was a refugee from Germany. His grandfather later served in the United States Army during World War II. Smith attended Morrisville State College and later transferred to the University at Albany, where he graduated with a degree in history.

== Career ==
He hosts the Part of the Problem podcast and used to cohost the comedy podcast Legion of Skanks. According to PorcFest, Part of the Problem is one of the top two libertarian podcasts in the world. On Part of the Problem, Smith has interviewed political figures such as Vivek Ramaswamy and Robert F. Kennedy Jr. Smith has also made appearances on The Joe Rogan Experience, Piers Morgan Uncensored, and Timcast.

He was the MC for FreedomFest, a libertarian festival, in 2021, and a featured speaker there in 2022. According to the Southern Poverty Law Center (SPLC), Smith was running the Libertarian Party's social media in 2022, but he has denied this saying that he only "helped with the Twitter".

Smith considered running in the 2024 Libertarian Party presidential primaries but ultimately decided against it. He also declined to run as Robert F. Kennedy Jr.'s vice presidential candidate, citing Kennedy's staunch support for Israel in its Gaza war. Smith spoke at the 2024 Libertarian National Convention.

== Political views ==
Smith is a member of the Mises Caucus of the Libertarian Party. Smith said in a 2017 Reason interview that he "became a libertarian through the Ron Paul movement". He has opposed what he sees as big tech hegemony, describing it as "the biggest threat to liberty" aside from the "tyranny of COVID-19". He believes vaccine mandates are an infringement of personal liberty and told Reason in 2021 that he did not plan to vaccinate himself or his child against COVID-19. Smith defended the Libertarian Party of Kentucky when it criticized proposed vaccine passports by comparing them to yellow stars that Jews were forced to wear. Reason described him as "a vocal opponent of wokeness and political correctness". An admirer of the anarcho-capitalist economist Murray Rothbard, he told Reason that, like Rothbard, he would abolish government if he could.

Although Smith has spoken to figures with a wide range of beliefs, he has been criticized for interviews and debates with people on the far-right, such as Gavin McInnes, Nick Fuentes, Richard Spencer, and Christopher Cantwell. Smith has called Fuentes a "fellow traveler." According to the Southern Poverty Law Center, Smith himself is part of the far-right. In an interview with Nick Gillespie, Smith defended his openness to debate alt-right figures, saying "People who listen to my podcasts have no doubt about where I stand on all of these issues" and said that his libertarian beliefs are "the antithesis of National Socialism."

Smith has said he did not support the 2024 Libertarian Party nominee, Chase Oliver, saying that Oliver did not do enough to fight COVID-19 policies, such as lockdowns and vaccine mandates. Smith had the same criticism for the party's 2020 nominee, Jo Jorgensen.

In 2024, Smith hosted a Twitter space with Chase Oliver, Angela McArdle, and other Libertarian Party figures. He admitted that, after the second cabinet of Donald Trump did not include the appointment of any Libertarians to the cabinet, that they had "lost" the battle to keep "warhawks" out of the cabinet.

In an interview with Krystal Ball and Saagar Enjeti on Breaking Points on June 16, 2025, Smith, who endorsed Donald Trump prior to the election and said he would vote for him, expressed extreme disappointment in President Trump and even called for Trump to be impeached and removed from office due to his bombing of Iran amid nuclear weapons negotiations, which increased the possibility of getting the US into a war with Iran.

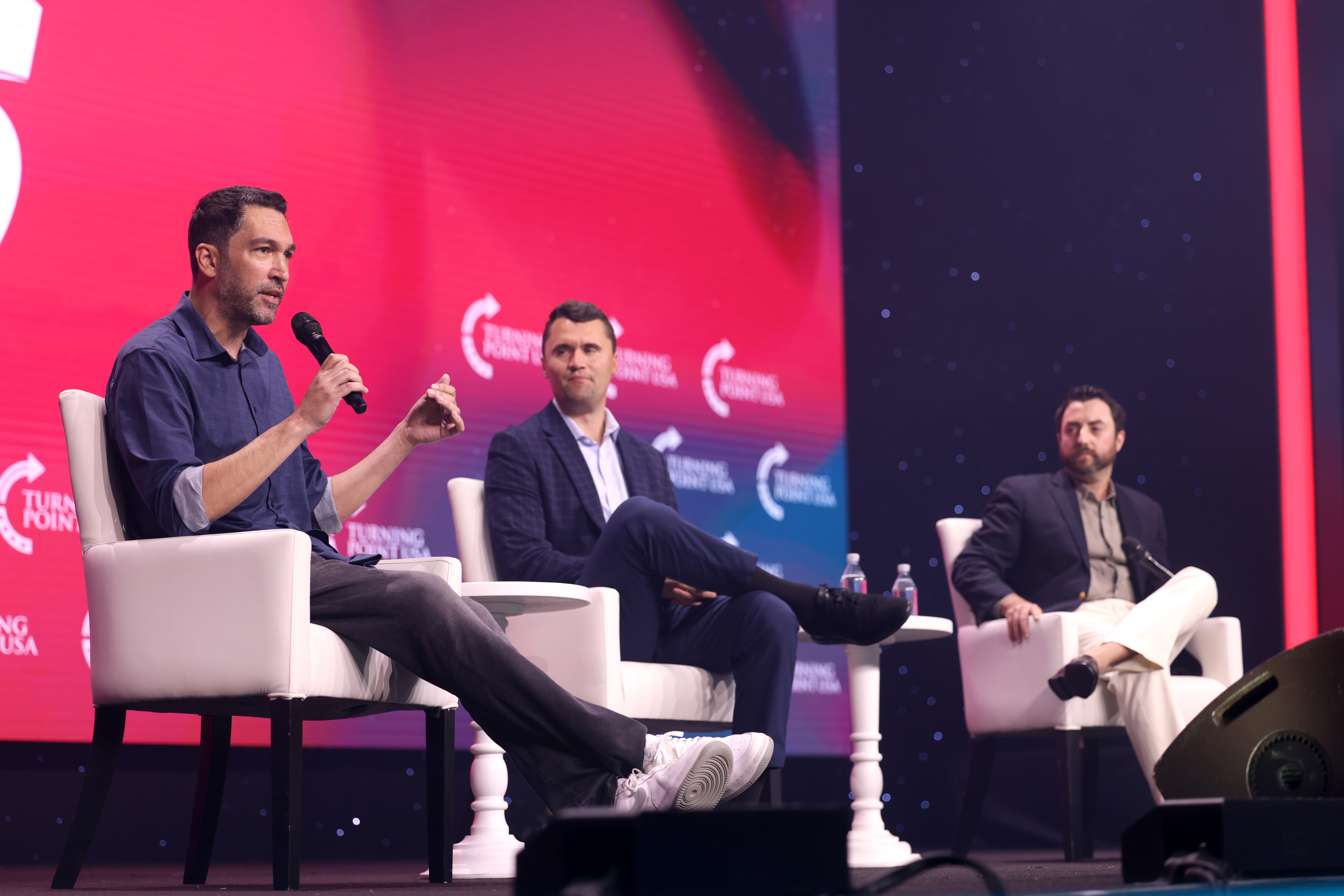
Smith debating Josh Hammer about Israel in July 2025 at the Student Action Summit, moderated by Charlie Kirk

Smith has strong anti-Zionist views and frequently debates the issue, including against English neoconservative Douglas Murray and US panelist Adam Sosnick.

== See also ==
- Angela McArdle
- Michael Malice
- Tom Woods
- Paleolibertarianism
- List of American libertarians
- List of Jewish American entertainers
