= 2024 United States presidential election in Massachusetts =

- November 5, 2024
- Turnout: 68.31% ▼

Nominee	Kamala Harris	Donald Trump
Party	Democratic	Republican
Home state	California	Florida
Running mate	Tim Walz	JD Vance
Electoral vote	11	0
Popular vote	2,126,518	1,251,303
Percentage	61.22%	36.02%

Harris
40–50%
50–60%
60–70%
70–80%
80–90%
90–100%
Trump
40–50%
50–60%
60–70%
No data
President before election
Joe Biden
Democratic
Elected President
Donald Trump
Republican

The 2024 United States presidential election in Massachusetts was held on Tuesday, November 5, 2024, as part of the 2024 United States elections. Massachusetts voters chose electors to represent them in the Electoral College via a popular vote. Eleven members of the Electoral College came from Massachusetts.

A New England state, Massachusetts has been a Democratic leaning state since 1928, and a Democratic stronghold since 1960, and is considered a deeply blue state today. (Note: George H. W. Bush was the last Republican presidential nominee to win any counties in Massachusetts in 1988.) Democrats have consistently defeated Republicans by large margins in Massachusetts since 1992. In 2020, Joe Biden won the state by more than 33%, the largest margin since Lyndon B. Johnson in 1964.

Kamala Harris won Massachusetts along with every county in the state. She defeated Donald Trump by 25 points. This was an eight-point shift toward the Republican Party from 2020, and Harris's margin was smaller than that for Hillary Clinton in 2016. Despite Harris winning over 60% of the vote in the state and every county there, Massachusetts had one of the largest swings of any state, swinging by more than the national swing of about 6%. (Note: New York and New Jersey had the largest swings towards Trump in 2024, swinging by over 10 percentage points.) This was part of a trend of blue states, such as New York, New Jersey, California (Harris's home state), and Illinois, which all swung significantly towards Republicans.

== Primary elections ==
=== Democratic primary ===
The Massachusetts Democratic primary was held on Super Tuesday, March 5, 2024.

Massachusetts Democratic primary, March 5, 2024
Candidate	Votes	%	Delegates
Joe Biden (incumbent)	533,096	80.45	91
No Preference	60,236	9.09	1
Dean Phillips	29,728	4.49	0
Marianne Williamson	20,402	3.08	0
Cenk Uygur (write-in)	82	0.01	0
Other candidates (write-in) (Note: The names of non-disclosed write-in votes were published as "All Others".)	10,135	1.53	—
Blank ballots	8,930	1.35	—
Total	662,609	100%	92

=== Republican primary ===
The Massachusetts Republican primary was held on Super Tuesday, March 5, 2024.

Massachusetts Republican primary, March 5, 2024
Candidate	Votes	Percentage	Actual delegate count		
Candidate	Votes	Percentage	Bound	Unbound	Total
Donald Trump	343,189	59.56%	40	0	40
Nikki Haley	211,440	36.69%	0	0	0
No Preference	5,717	0.99%	0	0	0
Chris Christie (withdrawn)	5,217	0.91%	0	0	0
Ron DeSantis (withdrawn)	3,981	0.69%	0	0	0
Vivek Ramaswamy (withdrawn)	1,738	0.30%	0	0	0
Other candidates	1,674	0.29%	0	0	0
Ryan Binkley (withdrawn)	619	0.11%	0	0	0
Asa Hutchinson (withdrawn)	527	0.09%	0	0	0
Blank ballots	2,148	0.37%	0	0	0
Total:	576,250	100.00%	40	0	40

=== Libertarian primary ===
The Massachusetts Libertarian primary was held on March 5, 2024.

Massachusetts Libertarian primary, March 5, 2024
Candidate	Votes	Percentage
No Preference	3,982	36.45%
Chase Oliver	1,453	13.30%
Jacob Hornberger	1,089	9.97%
Michael Rectenwald	546	5.00%
Lars Mapstead	399	3.65%
Mike ter Maat	314	2.87%
All Others	2,161	19.78%
Blank ballots	980	8.97%
Total:	10,924	100.00%

== General election ==
=== Predictions ===
Source	Ranking	As of
The Cook Political Report	Solid D	December 19, 2023
Inside Elections	Solid D	April 26, 2023
Sabato's Crystal Ball	Safe D	June 29, 2023
Decision Desk HQ/The Hill	Safe D	December 14, 2023
CNalysis	Solid D	December 30, 2023
CNN	Solid D	January 14, 2024
The Economist	Safe D	June 12, 2024
538	Solid D	June 11, 2024
RCP	Solid D	June 26, 2024
NBC News	Safe D	October 6, 2024

=== Polling ===
Kamala Harris vs. Donald Trump

Poll source	Date(s) administered	Sample size (Note: Key: A – all adults RV – registered voters LV – likely voters V – unclear)	Margin of error	Kamala Harris Democratic	Donald Trump Republican	Other / Undecided
ActiVote	October 2–30, 2024	400 (LV)	± 4.9%	66%	34%	–
Emerson College (Note: Poll sponsored by WHDH)	October 24–26, 2024	1,000 (LV)	± 3.0%	59%	36%	5% (Note: "Someone else" with 3%)
Emerson College	October 24–26, 2024	1,000 (LV)	± 3.0%	60% (Note: With voters who lean towards a given candidate)	37%	3%
ActiVote	September 6 – October 16, 2024	400 (LV)	± 4.9%	67%	33%	–
MassINC Polling Group (Note: Poll sponsored by CommonWealth Beacon and WBUR)	September 12–18, 2024	800 (LV)	± 4.1%	63%	35%	2% (Note: "Would not vote" with 1%)

Kamala Harris vs. Donald Trump vs. Cornel West vs. Jill Stein vs. Chase Oliver

Poll source	Date(s) administered	Sample size	Margin of error	Kamala Harris Democratic	Donald Trump Republican	Cornel West Independent	Jill Stein Green	Chase Oliver Libertarian	Other / Undecided
University of New Hampshire	October 29 – November 2, 2024	744 (LV)	± 3.6%	60%	34%	–	2%	1%	3% (Note: Claudia De la Cruz (PSL) & "Another Candidate" with 1% each)
YouGov (Note: Poll sponsored by the University of Massachusetts Amherst Department of Political Science & WCVB-TV)	October 3–10, 2024	700 (A)	± 4.8%	56%	30%	–	2%	1%	11% (Note: Claudia De la Cruz (PSL) & Shiva Ayyadurai (I) with 1% each)
Suffolk University (Note: Poll sponsored by The Boston Globe)	October 1–4, 2024	500 (LV)	± 4.4%	61%	32%	–	1%	0%	6%
University of New Hampshire	September 12–16, 2024	546 (LV)	± 4.1%	62%	31%	–	2%	0%	5%

Hypothetical polling with Robert F. Kennedy Jr.

Kamala Harris vs. Donald Trump vs. Robert F. Kennedy Jr. vs. Cornel West vs. Jill Stein vs. Chase Oliver

Poll source	Date(s) administered	Sample size	Margin of error	Kamala Harris Democratic	Donald Trump Republican	Robert Kennedy Jr Independent	Cornel West Independent	Jill Stein Green	Chase Oliver Libertarian	Other / Undecided
MassINC Polling Group	October 29 – November 1, 2024	582 (LV)	± 4.9%	61%	31%	2%	0%	1%	0%	5% (Note: "Prefer not to say" with 2%; "Another candidate" & "Would not vote for president" with 1% each)
MassINC Polling Group	September 12–18, 2024	800 (LV)	± 4.1%	60%	32%	3%	0%	1%	0%	4% (Note: "Another candidate" with 2%; "Would not vote" with 1%)

Hypothetical polling with Joe Biden and Donald Trump

Joe Biden vs. Donald Trump

Poll source	Date(s) administered	Sample size	Margin of error	Joe Biden Democratic	Donald Trump Republican	Other / Undecided
Suffolk University	July 16–18, 2024	500 (LV)	± 4.4%	47%	29%	24%
University of New Hampshire	May 16–20, 2024	526 (LV)	± 4.3%	68%	32%	–
John Zogby Strategies (Note: Poll conducted for Kennedy's campaign)	April 13–21, 2024	534 (LV)	–	55%	36%	9%
Mainstreet Research/Florida Atlantic University	February 29 – March 3, 2024	271 (RV)	–	58%	34%	8% (Note: "Another candidate" with 5%)
Mainstreet Research/Florida Atlantic University	February 29 – March 3, 2024	263 (LV)	–	59%	34%	7%
University of Massachusetts Lowell	October 18–25, 2022	1,000 (LV)	± 4.1%	58%	32%	10%
Emerson College	September 7–8, 2022	708 (LV)	± 3.6%	54%	34%	12%
University of Massachusetts Lowell	June 7–15, 2022	1,000 (LV)	± 4.0%	60%	31%	9%

Joe Biden vs. Donald Trump vs. Robert F. Kennedy Jr. vs. Cornel West vs. Jill Stein

Poll source	Date(s) administered	Sample size	Margin of error	Joe Biden Democratic	Donald Trump Republican	Robert Kennedy Jr Independent	Cornel West Independent	Jill Stein Green	Other / Undecided
University of New Hampshire	May 16–20, 2024	526 (LV)	± 4.3%	55%	26%	10%	1%	2%	6%
MassINC Polling Group (Note: Poll sponsored by CommonWealth Beacon and WGBH-TV)	March 21–29, 2024	1,002 (RV)	± 3.4%	44%	26%	7%	2%	–	21% (Note: "Another candidate" & "Would not vote" with 3% each)
MassINC Polling Group	March 21–29, 2024	1,002 (RV)	± 3.4%	46%	28%	9%	2%	–	15% (Note: "Another candidate" with 4%; "Would not vote" with 3%)

Joe Biden vs. Donald Trump vs. Robert F. Kennedy Jr.

Poll source	Date(s) administered	Sample size	Margin of error	Joe Biden Democratic	Donald Trump Republican	Robert F. Kennedy Jr. Independent	Other / Undecided
YouGov	May 17–30, 2024	700 (A)	± 4.4%	48%	27%	9%	16%
Suffolk University	April 16–20, 2024	500 (LV)	± 4.4%	52%	22%	8%	18%
Suffolk University	February 2–5, 2024	1,000 (LV)	± 3.1%	45%	26%	9%	21%
YouGov	October 13–20, 2023	700 (V)	± 5.1%	43%	21%	17%	19%

Hypothetical polling with other candidates

Joe Biden vs. Robert F. Kennedy Jr.

Poll source	Date(s) administered	Sample size	Margin of error	Joe Biden Democratic	Robert F. Kennedy Jr. Independent	Other / Undecided
John Zogby Strategies	April 13–21, 2024	534 (LV)	–	48%	42%	10%

Robert F. Kennedy Jr. vs. Donald Trump

Poll source	Date(s) administered	Sample size	Margin of error	Robert F. Kennedy Jr. Independent	Donald Trump Republican	Other / Undecided
John Zogby Strategies	April 13–21, 2024	534 (LV)	–	46%	33%	21%

=== Results ===
State House district results: Trump 40–50% 50–60% / Harris 40–50% 50–60% 60–70% 70–80% 80–90% 90–100%

2024 United States presidential election in Massachusetts
Party	Candidate	Votes	%	±%
Democratic	Kamala Harris; Tim Walz	2,126,518	61.22%	▼4.38
Republican	Donald Trump; JD Vance	1,251,303	36.02%	▲3.88
Green-Rainbow	Jill Stein; Gloria Caballero-Roca (Note: Replacement for Butch Ware, Stein's vice presidential nominee.)	26,545	0.76%	▲0.25
Independent	Shiva Ayyadurai; Crystal Ellis	18,418	0.53%	N/A
Libertarian	Chase Oliver; Mike ter Maat	17,735	0.51%	▼0.78
Socialism and Liberation	Claudia De la Cruz; Karina Garcia	12,889	0.37%	N/A
Write-in		20,260	0.58%	▲0.13
Total votes		3,473,668	100.00%	N/A

==== By county ====
County	Kamala Harris Democratic		Donald Trump Republican		Various candidates Other parties		Margin		Total
County	#	%	#	%	#	%	#	%	Total
Barnstable	88,129	59.23%	57,451	38.61%	3,205	2.15%	30,678	20.62%	148,785
Berkshire	47,094	68.58%	19,805	28.84%	1,775	2.58%	27,289	39.74%	68,674
Bristol	137,786	49.56%	134,196	48.27%	6,035	2.17%	3,590	1.29%	278,017
Dukes	9,137	74.84%	2,745	22.48%	327	2.68%	6,392	52.36%	12,209
Essex	236,624	58.88%	155,336	38.66%	9,891	2.46%	81,288	20.22%	401,851
Franklin	28,305	67.00%	12,428	29.42%	1,515	3.59%	15,877	37.58%	42,248
Hampden	110,937	53.18%	92,474	44.33%	5,193	2.49%	18,463	8.85%	208,604
Hampshire	58,617	69.19%	23,256	27.45%	2,847	3.36%	35,361	41.74%	84,720
Middlesex	554,471	68.05%	235,118	28.85%	25,243	3.10%	319,353	39.20%	814,832
Nantucket	4,784	67.21%	2,171	30.50%	163	2.29%	2,613	36.71%	7,118
Norfolk	242,712	62.81%	132,497	34.29%	11,238	2.91%	110,215	28.52%	386,447
Plymouth	159,962	53.30%	133,544	44.50%	6,623	2.21%	26,418	8.80%	300,129
Suffolk	222,280	74.29%	66,480	22.22%	10,433	3.49%	155,800	52.07%	299,193
Worcester	225,680	53.63%	183,802	43.67%	11,359	2.70%	41,878	9.96%	420,841
Totals	2,126,518	61.22%	1,251,303	36.02%	95,847	2.76%	875,215	25.20%	3,473,668

Municipalities that flipped from Democratic to Republican
- Athol
- Barre
- Fall River
- Florida
- Hanover
- Hardwick
- Lynnfield
- Millbury
- Northbridge
- Orange
- Pembroke
- Plympton
- Rockland
- Rutland
- Salisbury
- Saugus
- Seekonk
- Somerset
- Sutton
- Townsend
- Uxbridge
- Webster
- West Brookfield
- Westfield
- Westminster
- Westport
- Whitman

==== By congressional district ====
Harris won all nine congressional districts.

District	Harris	Trump	Representative
1st	55.53%	41.97%	Richard Neal
2nd	60.26%	36.71%	Jim McGovern
3rd	58.13%	39.25%	Lori Trahan
4th	58.44%	38.85%	Jake Auchincloss
5th	70.85%	25.97%	Katherine Clark
6th	59.04%	38.47%	Seth Moulton
7th	79.43%	16.77%	Ayanna Pressley
8th	61.72%	35.49%	Stephen Lynch
9th	54.29%	43.58%	Bill Keating

== Analysis ==
Harris's 25.20% margin was similar to those of other 21st century Democratic nominees, albeit below Hillary Clinton's 27.20% margin in 2016 and Joe Biden's 33.46% margin in 2020, and she won every county in the state like all Democratic nominees from 1992 onward. However, despite remaining strongly Democratic, Massachusetts shifted significantly rightward in this election, with all of its counties shifting rightward. It had one of the largest swings of any state, swinging by 8%, which was more than the national swing of 6%. This was despite the state being one of the most liberal.

This was the first time that a Democrat won less than 50% of the vote in Bristol County since 1992, the closest a Republican had come to winning a county in Massachusetts since 1988, and the first time a Republican candidate won Fall River since 1924. Trump was initially ahead in Bristol County on election night before it narrowly stayed blue as more votes were counted. In addition, it was the first time a Republican candidate won Somerset since 1956, and the first time a Republican candidate won Westport and Seekonk (all in Bristol County) since 1984. Of the 351 municipalities in Massachusetts, Trump flipped 26, while Harris flipped none. A total of 339 municipalities shifted towards Trump, while only 12 shifted towards Harris. Harris's largest gain was in Gosnold, where she improved on Biden's margin of victory by 12.2%, while Trump's largest gain was in Lawrence, where he cut his margin of defeat by 31%. Despite losing the city to Harris by a wide margin, Trump managed to win two precincts in Boston, the first time in his three runs that he managed to win any.

Trump's gains were powered significantly by Hispanic Americans, which make up a significant percentage of the population of Massachusetts and shifted heavily to the right in 2024. Lawrence, a heavily Dominican American city in northern Massachusetts, gave Trump 43% of the vote, a gain of over 30% from 2020. The six most Hispanic cities in Massachusetts (namely Lawrence, Lynn, Everett, Chelsea, Holyoke, and Springfield) saw Harris' margin of victory drop a combined 18% from 2020.

Per the Fox News exit poll, Harris did better among voters making over $100,000 a year in Massachusetts (66–32%) than all other groups making less than $100,000 a year. Relatedly, Harris won voters with graduate degrees in Massachusetts in a landslide (75–22%), better than all other educational groups.

== See also ==
- United States presidential elections in Massachusetts
- 2024 United States presidential election
- 2024 Democratic Party presidential primaries
- 2024 Republican Party presidential primaries
- 2024 United States elections

== Notes ==
Partisan clients
