= Julie Mostov =

American political scientist, academic administrator

- Education: Mount Holyoke College (AB); University of Belgrade (MA); New York University (PhD)
- Occupations: Political scientist, academic administrator
- Employer: New York University

Julie Mostov is an American political scientist, academic administrator and consultant. She was the dean of NYU Liberal Studies from 2017 to 2025.

== Early life ==
Mostov graduated from Mount Holyoke College. She earned a master's degree from the University of Belgrade and a PhD from New York University.

== Career ==
Mostov was professor of Political Science at Drexel University, where she later became senior vice provost for global initiatives. In August 2017, she succeeded Fred Schwarzbach as the dean of NYU Liberal Studies. She was succeeded on September 1, 2025 on an interim basis by anthropologist Bruce Grant.

As a consultant in the Balkans, she has received over $2 million from the United States Department of State. She is also the president and director of Women Against Abuse.

Mostov is the author of two books, and the co-editor of a third book.

== Works ==
- Mostov, Julie (1992). Power, Process, and Popular Sovereignty. Philadelphia, Pennsylvania: Temple University Press. ISBN 9780877229704. OCLC 438551074.
- Iveković, Rada; Mostov, Julie, eds. (2002). From Gender to Nation. Ravenna: Longo. ISBN 9788880633419. OCLC 904556147.
- Mostov, Julie (2008). Soft Borders: Rethinking Sovereignty and Democracy. London, U.K.: Palgrave Macmillan. ISBN 9780230612440. OCLC 759641961.
