= 2024 Libertarian Party presidential primaries =

- January 13 to June 4, 2024

Non-binding preferential vote
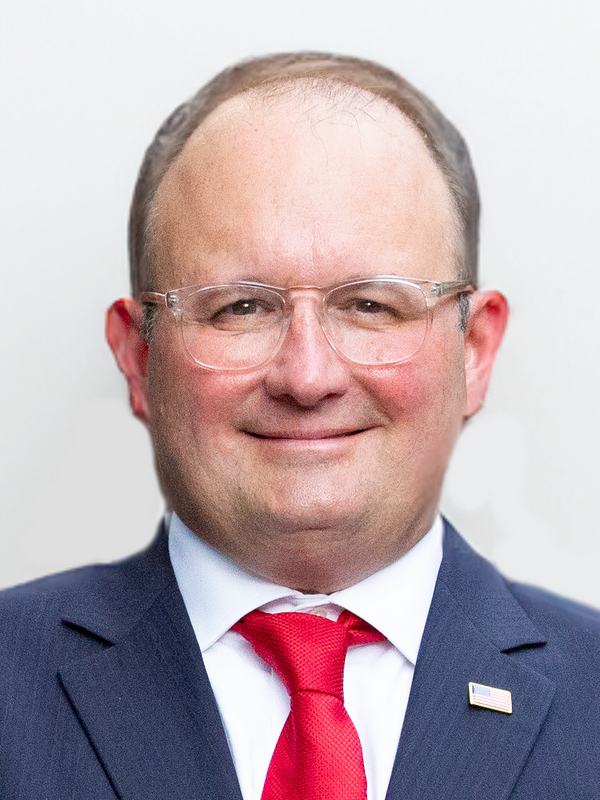

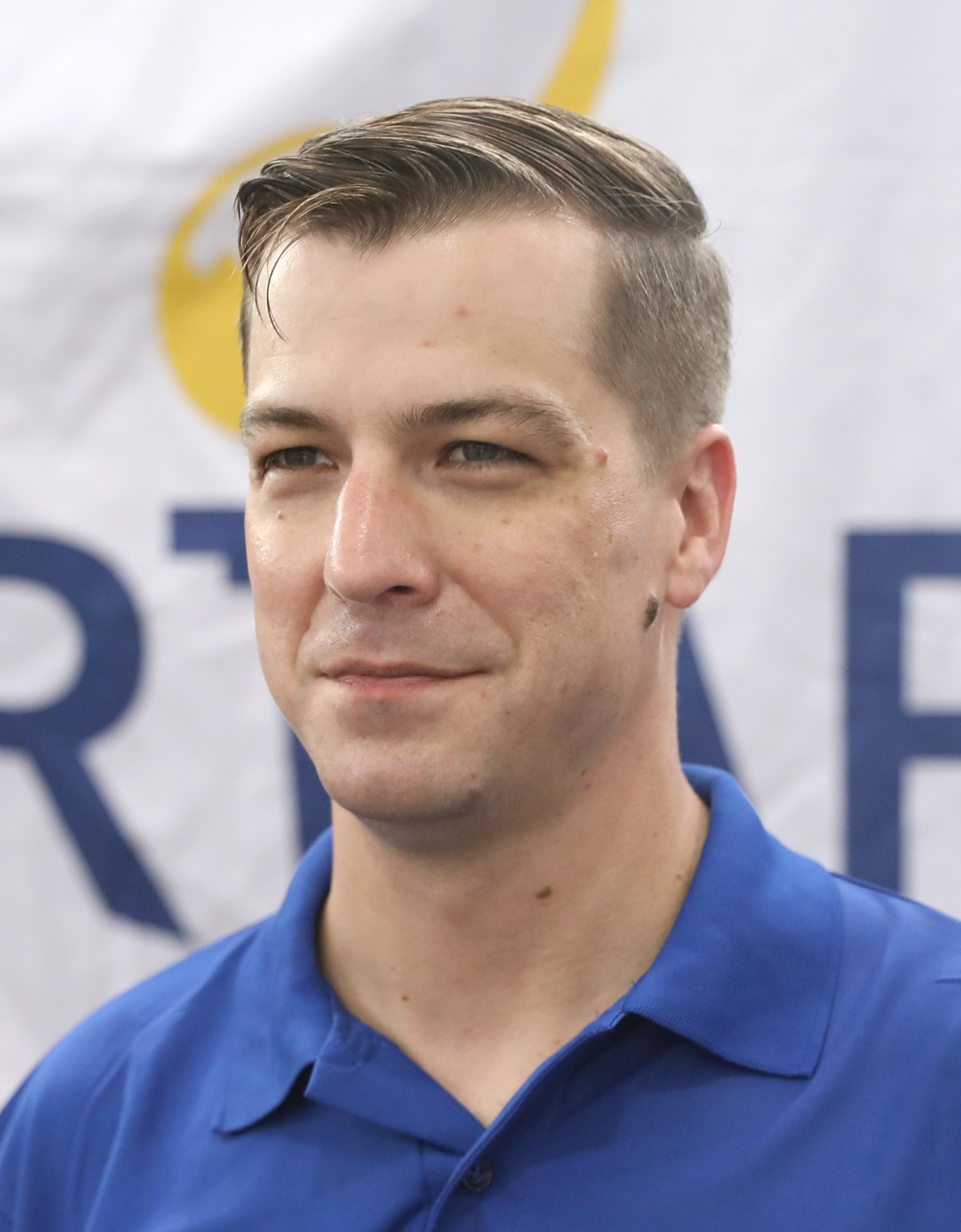

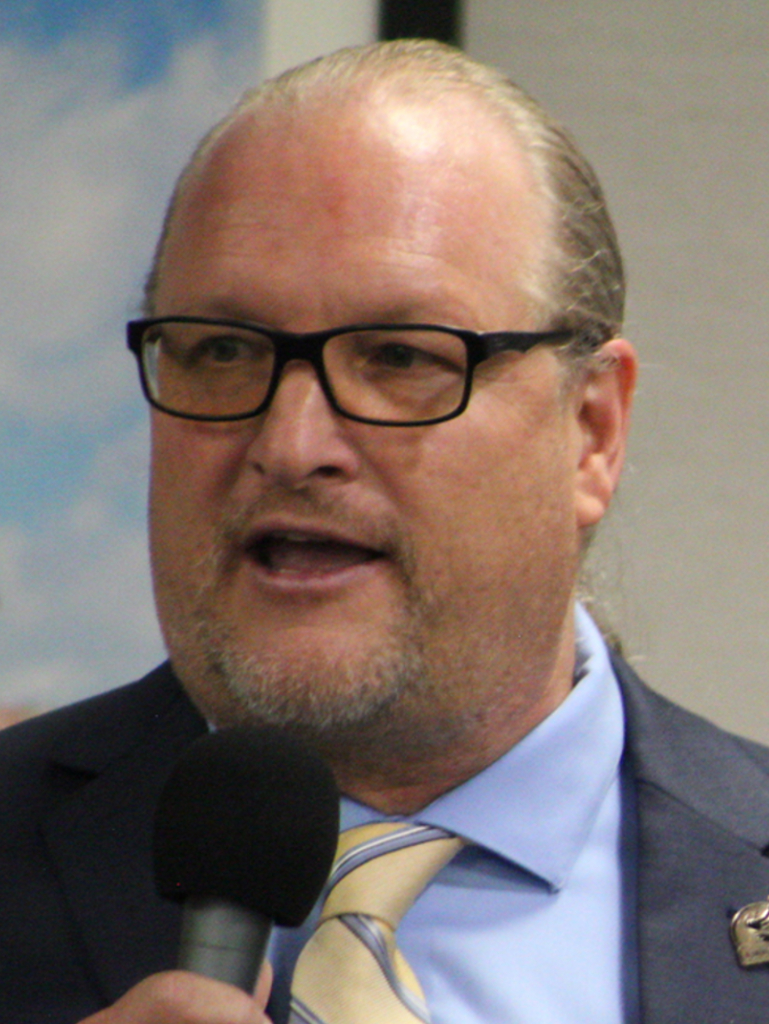

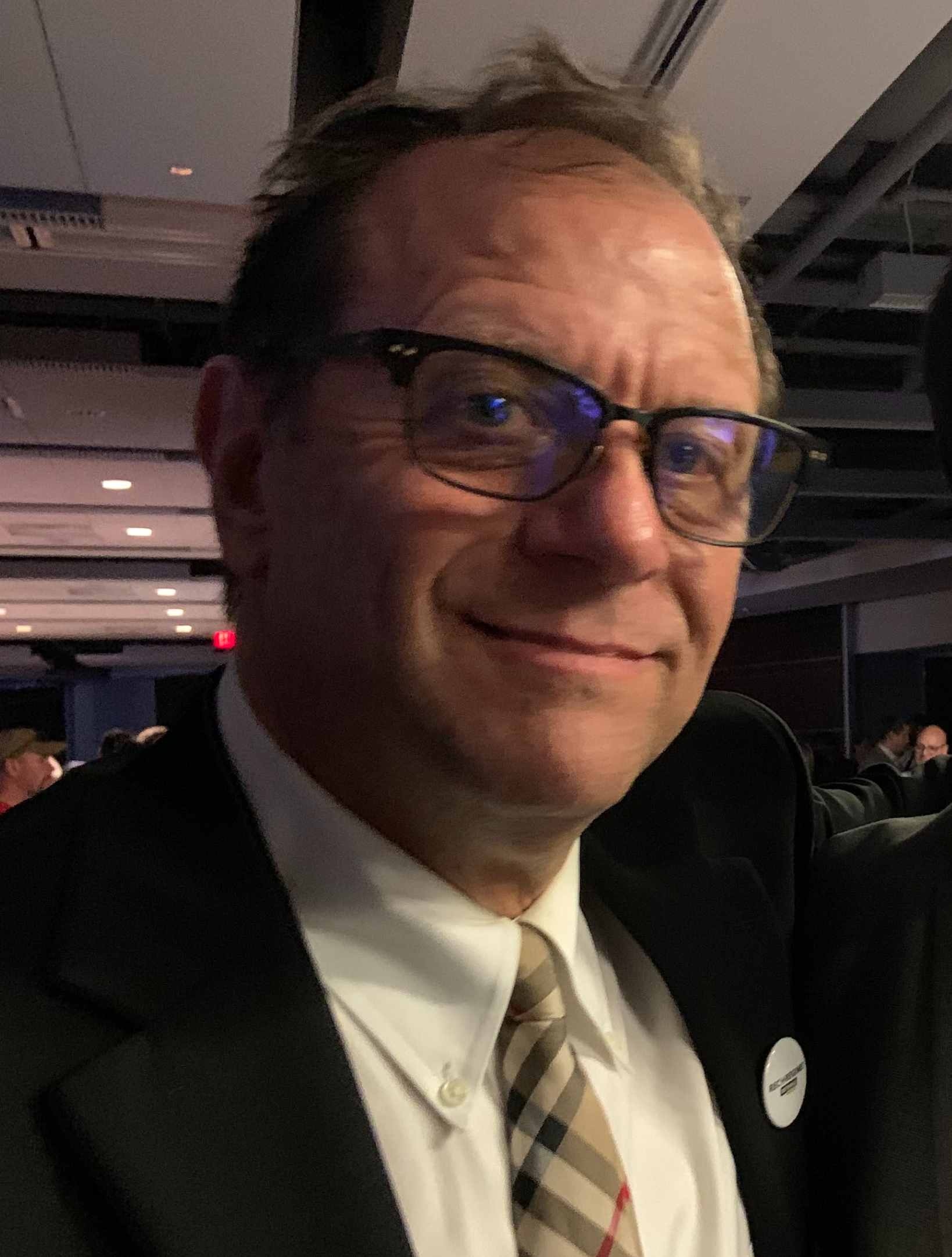

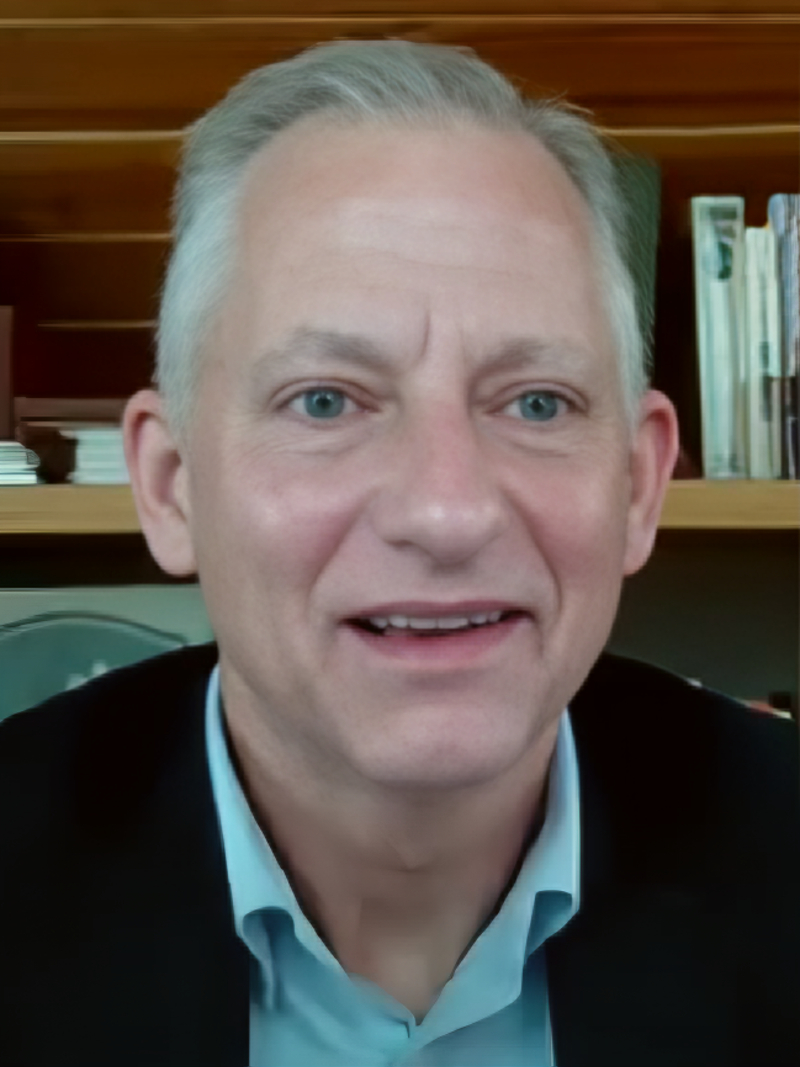

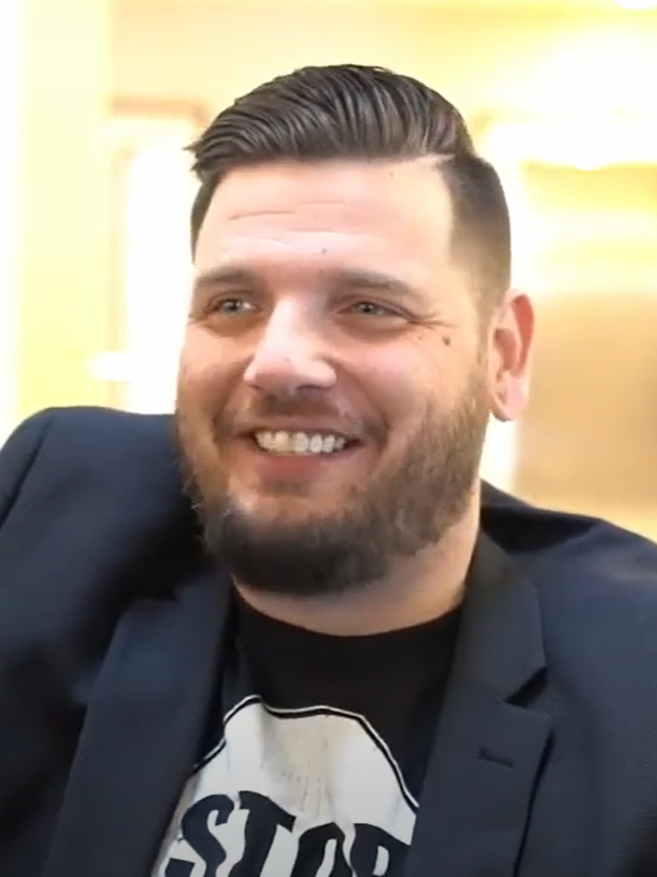
Candidate	Charles Ballay	None of the above (Note: Includes 'No Preference' in North Carolina)	Chase Oliver (Note: The primaries were non-binding. Despite not receiving a plurality of the popular vote, Oliver was able to secure a majority of delegate votes at the convention, and thus the nomination.)
Home state	Louisiana	—	Georgia
Contests won	1	2	6
Popular vote	22,337 (Note: Popular vote totals are incomplete as some contests do not report raw vote totals.)	6,384	3,498
Percentage	55.1%	15.7%	8.6%
Candidate	Jacob Hornberger	Lars Mapstead	Michael Rectenwald
Home state	Virginia	California	Pennsylvania
Contests won	0	2	2
Popular vote	2,043	1,222	943
Percentage	5.0%	3.0%	2.3%
Candidate	Mike ter Maat	Joshua Smith
Home state	Florida	Iowa
Contests won	1	1
Popular vote	589	416
Percentage	1.5%	1.0%

First place by first-instance vote
Chase Oliver
None of the Above
Write-in
Michael Rectenwald
Mike ter Maat
Lars Mapstead
Joshua Smith
Jacob Hornberger
Charles Ballay
Toad Anderson
No vote
Previous Libertarian nominee
Jo Jorgensen
Libertarian nominee
Chase Oliver

The 2024 Libertarian Party presidential primaries and caucuses were a series of electoral contests to indicate non-binding preferences for the Libertarian Party (LP) presidential nominee in the 2024 United States presidential election. These differed from the Republican or Democratic presidential primaries and caucuses in that they do not appoint delegates to represent a candidate at the party's convention to select the party's presidential nominee.

The party's nominee was chosen directly by registered delegates at the 2024 Libertarian National Convention on May 26 in Washington, D.C. Chase Oliver was chosen as the party's nominee in the seventh round of voting.

== Results ==
Candidates and ballot options listed on multiple ballots and receiving at least 1% of the national popular vote are listed individually on the table. All remaining votes are detailed under the other column.

Legend:	1st place (popular vote)	2nd place (popular vote)	3rd place (popular vote)	Candidate withdrew	Candidate unable to appear on ballot

Date	Contest	Candidates and results								
Date	Contest	Charles Ballay	Jacob Hornberger	Lars Mapstead	Chase Oliver	Michael Rectenwald	Joshua Smith	Mike ter Maat	Other	None of the Above
January 13	Arizona (Note: Popular Vote Unavailable)	Not on ballot	2nd	5th	1st	3rd	3rd	5th	Not on ballot	2 votes (Note: Not included in popular vote total)
January 15	Iowa	0% 0 votes	1.1% 1 vote	1.1% 1 vote	42.7% 38 votes	16.9% 15 votes	13.5% 12 votes	13.5% 12 votes	10.1% 9 votes (Note: 4 votes for Vivek Ramaswamy (Not a candidate), 2 votes for Robert Sansone, 2 votes for Mario Perales, 1 vote for Art Olivier)	1.1% 1 vote
February 3	Alabama	4th	6th	3rd	5th	1st	Not on ballot	2nd	6th (Note: Joseph Collins Jr.)	Not on ballot
February 24	Mississippi	0% 0 votes	11.8% 2 votes	29.4% 5 votes	11.8% 2 votes	41.2% 7 votes	0% 0 votes	0% 0 votes	0% 0 votes	5.9% 1 vote
February 27	Minnesota	2.3% 1 vote	14.0% 6 votes	0% 0 votes	23.3% 10 votes	20.9% 9 votes	30.2% 13 votes	4.7% 2 votes	2.3% 1 vote (Note: 1 vote for David Reed DeSilva III)	2.3% 1 vote
March 2	Indiana	Not on ballot	4.0% 4 votes	13.9% 14 votes	62.4% 63 votes	5.9% 6 votes	4.0% 4 votes	6.9% 7 votes	Not on ballot	3.0% 3 votes
March 2	Pennsylvania	2.2% 3 votes	4.4% 6 votes	0.1% 1 vote (Note: As a write-in candidate)	19.0% 26 votes	22.6% 31 votes	16.1% 22 votes	28.5% 39 votes	6.6% 9 votes (Note: 4 votes for Art Olivier, 1 vote for Joseph Collins Jr., 2 write-in votes for Toad Anderson, 1 write-in vote for Dave Smith (not a candidate), and 1 write-in vote for Rowan Atkinson (not a candidate))	Not on ballot
March 5	North Carolina	3.6% 183 votes	7.0% 357 votes	3.5% 176 votes	13.3% 676 votes	3.8% 195 votes	7.0% 354 votes	2.7% 137 votes	18.7% 946 votes (Note: 464 votes (9.1%) for David (TrimeTaveler) Dunlap, 320 votes (6.3%) for Beau Lindsey, 162 votes (3.2%) for John "Toad" Anderson)	40.5% 2,058 votes (Note: Listed as No Preference)
March 5	California	98.6% 21,906 votes	Not on ballot		1.4% (Note: As a write-in candidate); 313 votes	Not on ballot				
March 5	Oklahoma	Not on ballot	38.9% 362 votes	Not on ballot	61.1% 569 votes	Not on ballot				
March 5	Massachusetts	Not on ballot	11.0% 1,089 votes	4.0% 399 votes	14.6% 1,453 votes	5.5% 546 votes	Not on ballot	3.2% 314 votes	21.7% 2,161 votes (Note: Scattered write-ins)	40.0% 3,982 votes
April 2	Connecticut	First Ballot: 6.6% 7 votes Final Ballot: 0.0% 0 votes	First Ballot: 11.3% 12 votes Final Ballot: 34.4% 23 votes	First Ballot: 6.6% 7 votes Final Ballot: 0.0% 0 votes	First Ballot: 34.9% 37 votes Final Ballot: 65.6% 49 votes	First Ballot: 14.6% 14 votes Final Ballot: 0.0% 0 votes	First Ballot: 9.4% 10 votes Final Ballot: 0.0% 0 votes	First Ballot: 8.5% 9 votes Final Ballot: 0.0% 0 votes	First Ballot: 3.8% 4 votes Final Ballot: 0.0% 0 votes (Note: For Joseph Collins Jr.)	First Ballot: 5.7% 6 votes Final Ballot: 0.0% 0 votes
May 5	Maine	Not on ballot	0.0% 0 votes	73.3% 11 votes	13.3% 2 votes	Not on ballot	6.7% 1 vote	0.0% 0 votes	6.7% 1 vote (Note: for Dave Smith (not a candidate))	Not on ballot
May 14	Nebraska	21.2% 249	18.2% 201	16.1% 178 votes	27.6% 309 votes	10.7% 120 votes	Not on ballot	6.2% 68 votes	Not on ballot	
June 4	New Mexico	Not on ballot		56.5% 428 votes	Not on ballot					43.5% 332 votes
Totals as of June 5 (See Above)		55.1% 22,337 votes	5.0% 2,043 votes	3.0% 1,222 votes	8.6% 3,498 votes	2.3% 943 votes	1.0% 416 votes	1.5% 589 votes	7.7% 3,131 votes (Note: 5.3%; 2,161 votes for Scattered write-ins 1.1%; 464 votes for David "Trime Taveler" Dunlap 0.8%; 320 votes for Beau Lindsey 0.4%; 164 votes for John "Toad" Anderson nil%; 5 votes for Art Olivier nil%; 5 votes for Joseph Collins Jr. nil%; 4 votes for Vivek Ramaswamy (ran as a Republican) nil%; 2 votes for Robert Sansone nil%; 2 votes for Mario Perales nil%; 2 votes for Dave Smith (not a candidate) nil%; 1 vote for David Reed DeSilva III nil%; 1 vote for Rowan Atkinson (not a candidate))	15.7% 6,384 votes

== Candidates ==
=== Major candidates ===
Prior to the LP 2024 National Convention, 38 candidates filed with the Federal Election Commission to run for the Libertarian Party presidential nomination in 2024.

==== Nominee ====
2024 Libertarian Party nominee
Name	Born	Experience	Home state	Campaign Announcement date	Contests won	Popular vote	Running mate (Note: While the Presidential and Vice-Presidential nominations occur separately, Presidential candidates often make known their preferred Vice Presidential nominees should they receive the nomination)	Ref.
Chase Oliver	August 16, 1985 (age 41); Nashville, Tennessee	Nominee for U.S. Senator from Georgia in 2022; Candidate for GA-05 in 2020; Chair of the Atlanta Libertarian Party (2016–2017)	Georgia	Campaign website April 5, 2023; FEC filing	6 (IA, IN, AZ, OK, CT, NE)	3,498 (8.6%)	Mike ter Maat (Note: Originally was announced as Kristin Alexander)	

==== Eliminated at convention ====
This section includes candidates who filed paperwork with the Federal Election Commission with intent to run under the Libertarian Party and who met one or more of the following criteria: a) meet Wikipedia's notability guidelines; b) participated in at least three Libertarian Party-sponsored debates; or c) received non-trivial media coverage as a candidate in this election cycle.

Eliminated in convention balloting
Candidate	Born	Experience	Home state	Campaign announced Announcement date	Campaign suspended Suspension date	Contests won	Popular vote	Ref.
No preference/ None of the above/ Uncommitted	N/A				May 26, 2024 (eliminated in seventh balloting)	2 (NC, MA)	6,384 (15.7%)	
Michael; Rectenwald	January 29, 1959 (age 67); Pittsburgh, Pennsylvania	Author and Scholar; Former New York University professor (2008–2019)	Pennsylvania	August 28, 2023; FEC filing	May 26, 2024 (eliminated in sixth balloting)	2 (MS, AL)	943 (2.3%)	
Mike ter Maat	June 20, 1961 (age 65); Portland, Oregon	Economist; Former Hallandale Beach, Florida police officer Nominee for FL-20 in 2022	Virginia	April 18, 2022; FEC filing	May 26, 2024 (eliminated during fifth balloting; endorsed Oliver during balloting) (ran for vice-president)	1 (PA)	589 (1.5%)	
Lars Mapstead	August 14, 1969 (age 57); Monterey, California	Co-founder of Friend Finder Networks; Founder of Fupa Games and Legendary Speed	California	March 23, 2021; FEC filing Running mate: Larry Sharpe	May 26, 2024 (eliminated during fourth balloting; endorsed Oliver after his nomination)	2 (ME, NM)	1,222 (3.0%)	
Joshua Smith	March 13, 1983 (age 43); Antioch, California	Vice Chair of the Libertarian National Committee (2022–2023)	Iowa	July 24, 2023; FEC filing	May 26, 2024 (eliminated during third balloting)	1 (MN)	416 (1.0%)	
Jacob Hornberger	January 28, 1950 (age 76); Laredo, Texas	Founder and President of the Future of Freedom Foundation; Independent candidate for U.S. Senate from Virginia in 2002; Candidate for President in 2000 and 2020	Virginia	February 20, 2023; FEC filing	May 26, 2024 (eliminated during second balloting)	0	2,043 (5.0%)	
Charles Ballay	January 1, 1970 (age 56); New Orleans, Louisiana	Otolaryngologist	Louisiana	August 24, 2023; FEC filing	May 26, 2024 (eliminated during initial balloting; endorsed Oliver after his nomination)	1 (CA)	22,337 (55.1%)	
Art Olivier	August 24, 1957 (age 69); Lynwood, California	Nominee for U.S. Vice President in 2000; Nominee for Governor of California in 2006; Mayor of Bellflower, California (1998–1999)	California	December 11, 2023; FEC filing	May 26, 2024 (eliminated during initial balloting)	0	5 (nil%)	

==== Withdrew before the primaries ====
Former candidates in the 2024 Libertarian Party presidential primaries
Name	Born	Experience	Home state	Campaign announced	Campaign suspended	Campaign	Ref.
Joe Exotic	March 5, 1963 (age 60); Garden City, Kansas	Businessman and media personality Owner of the Greater Wynnewood Exotic Animal Park (1998–2018); Independent candidate for president in 2016; Candidate for Governor of Oklahoma in 2018	Texas	March 10, 2023	April 11, 2023 (ran for the Democratic nomination)	FEC filing	

=== Other candidates ===
The following candidates achieved at least one of the following in the 2024 election cycle: appeared on a primary ballot, received votes in a LP-sanctioned contest that did not require ballot access, were invited to a party-sanctioned debate or forum, or were included on the Libertarian National Committee's list of candidates.

LNC delegates are not bound to votes in primary elections, so while voters are able choose a candidate, it has no direct effect on the nominee selection at the party's nominating convention.

On the ballot/received votes in multiple states

- Joshua "Toad" Anderson (NC, PA) (nominated on floor of the national convention as "Toad")
- Joseph Collins Jr., broadcaster from California (AL, MS, PA, CT)

On the ballot/received votes in one state

- David Reed DeSilva III of Arizona (MN)
- David "TrimeTaveler" Dunlap (NC) from Florida
- Beau Lindsey (NC), "anonymous candidate" from Tennessee
- Mario Perales (IA), alien hunter from Iowa
- Robert Sansone (IA), Air Force veteran and government contractor from Colorado

On the ballot/received votes in no states

- Jody Jones, activist and economist from Florida
- Joshua Rodriguez, computer scientist from Colorado

=== Declined to be candidates ===
The following notable individuals had been the subject of speculation about their possible candidacy, but either publicly denied interest in running, or ultimately did not run.

- Justin Amash, former U.S. representative from MI-03 (2011–2021), member of the Michigan House of Representatives from the 72nd district (2009–2011) (ran for U.S. Senate as a Republican, eliminated in primary)
- Spike Cohen, political activist, entrepreneur, podcaster, and Libertarian vice presidential nominee in 2020
- Chris Fronzak, lead musician for Attila
- Robert F. Kennedy Jr., environmental lawyer and founder of Children's Health Defense (previously ran for the Democratic nomination; ran as an independent before withdrawing and endorsing Trump)
- Vivek Ramaswamy, executive chairman of Strive Asset Management (2022–2023) and CEO of Roivant Sciences (2014–2021) (ran as a Republican; endorsed Trump)
- Dave Smith, stand-up comedian, libertarian political commentator, and podcaster (endorsed Rectenwald)
- Vermin Supreme, performance artist, activist, political satirist, perennial candidate, and candidate for the 2020 Libertarian presidential nomination (ran for the Democratic and Legal Marijuana Now nominations, now running as the US Pirate Party nominee)

== Endorsements ==
Lars Mapstead

Individuals

- Larry Sharpe, businessman, motivational speaker, and nominee for governor of New York in 2018 and 2022 (running mate)
Chase Oliver

Organizations

- Classical Liberal Caucus

Individuals

- Ronald Bailey, libertarian science writer
- Nick Gillespie, libertarian journalist, editor of Reason
- Gary Johnson, former governor of New Mexico (1995–2003), 2012 and 2016 Libertarian candidate for president
- Robby Soave, libertarian journalist, editor of Reason
- John Stossel, television personality and political pundit
- Jacob Sullum, columnist, senior editor of Reason
- Jesse Walker, books editor of Reason
Michael Rectenwald

State officials

- Andrew Napolitano, former judge of the New Jersey Superior Court (1987–1995)

Individuals

- Gene Epstein, economist
- Dave Smith, stand-up comedian, podcaster, and libertarian political commentator
- Maj Toure, libertarian political activist and rapper (Independent)

Organizations

- Mises Caucus
Joshua Smith

Individuals

- Shane Hazel, 2020 nominee for U.S. Senate in Georgia, 2022 nominee for governor in Georgia

== Timeline of the race ==
=== 2021 ===
- March 23: Co-founder of Friend Finder Networks Lars Mapstead files to run.

=== 2022 ===
- April 18: Mike ter Maat files to run.
- December 2: Nominee for Georgia's 2022 U.S. Senator race, Chase Oliver forms an exploratory committee for the party's nomination.

=== 2023 ===
- February 8: Vermin Supreme, a perennial candidate and satirist who had previously vied for party's nomination, announces his departure from the party, citing disagreements with party leadership.
- February 20: Jacob Hornberger, the runner-up for the party's 2020 nomination announces on X that he is seeking the nomination once again.
- March 10: Having been arrested in 2020 for his role in a murder-for-hire plot, Joe Exotic, from his prison cell, launches his campaign for the nomination via X
- April 5: Following a months long exploratory committee, Chase Oliver announces his candidacy for the presidential nomination on X.
- April 11: Following condemnation from party chair Angela McArdle and his own frustrations about party infighting and views on weapon ownership, Exotic suspends his campaign to instead run for the Democratic nomination.
- July 24: Former Vice Chair of the Libertarian National Committee Joshua Smith formally begins his campaign for the nomination.
- August 19: After campaigning extensively in Iowa throughout the summer, Oliver makes history as the first third-party presidential candidate to speak at the Iowa State Fair.
- August 24: Otolaryngologist Charles Ballay files to run for the nomination.
- August 28: Author and former New York University professor Michael Rectenwald files to seek the Libertarian presidential nomination, announcing his candidacy days later.
- December 11: 2000 vice presidential nominee Art Olivier files to run for the presidential nomination.

=== 2024 ===
- January 13 Chase Oliver wins the Arizona Libertarian Party straw poll.
- January 15: The Libertarian Party of Iowa held its first ever caucus as a recognized party in the state.
- January 16: Chase Oliver is announced as the caucus' winner via a plurality with 42.7% of the vote.
- February 3 Michael Rectenwald wins the Libertarian Party of Alabama straw poll.
- February 24 Rectenwald wins the Libertarian Party of Mississippi.
- February 27 Joshua Smith wins the Libertarian Party of Minnesota's internally-held presidential preference caucus.
- March 2;
  - Oliver wins the Libertarian Party of Indiana internally-held presidential preference caucus.
  - Oliver wins the Libertarian Party of Pennsylvania internally-held presidential preference caucus.
- March 5;
  - "No preference" wins the North Carolina Libertarian primary.
  - As the only candidate on the ballot, Charles Ballay wins the California Libertarian presidential primary.
  - Oliver wins the Oklahoma Libertarian presidential primary.
  - "No preference" wins Massachusetts Libertarian presidential primary.

=== Overview ===
Active campaign	Withdrawn candidate
Midterm elections	Primary
Super Tuesday	Libertarian National Convention

== Debates and forums ==
=== Schedule ===
Sites of the Libertarian Party presidential debates

=== Debates ===
The following table lists debates which were sponsored by an affiliate of the Libertarian Party.

Libertarian Party-sponsored debates among candidates for the 2024 Libertarian Party U.S. presidential nomination
Date	Place	Host	Participants								
P Participant. I Invitee. A Absent. N Confirmed non-invitee. O Out of race (exploring, suspended, or not yet entered).			Ballay	Hornberger	Mapstead	Oliver	Olivier	Rectenwald	Smith	ter Maat	Others
October 3, 2023	Stanhope, New Jersey	North New Jersey Libertarian Party	A	A	A (Note: Participated in a virtual interview prior to the debate)	P	O	P	P	A (Note: Participated in a virtual interview prior to the debate)	A
November 11, 2023 (Note: To qualify candidates needed to have raised $10,000 and to have campaigned in ten states)	North Charleston, South Carolina	South Carolina Libertarian Party	N	P	P	P	O	P	P	P	N
December 2, 2023	Cromwell, Connecticut	Connecticut Libertarian Party	A	P	P	P	O	P (Note: Participated virtually)	A (Note: Was announced as a participant but did not attend)	P	A
January 13, 2024	Tucson, Arizona	Arizona Libertarian Party	A	P	P	P	A	P	A (Note: Was announced as a participant but did not attend)	P	A
January 15, 2024	Des Moines, Iowa	Libertarian Party of Iowa	A	A	P	P	A (Note: Was announced as a participant but did not attend)	A	P	P	A
January 20, 2024	Jacksonville, Florida	Libertarian Party of Florida	A	P	P	P	A	P	P	P	A
January 27, 2024	Conyers, Georgia	Libertarian Party of Georgia	A	P	P	P	A	P	P	P	P (Note: Joshua "Toad" Anderson)
February 3, 2024	Delta, Alabama	Libertarian Party of Alabama	P	P	P	P	A	P	A	P	P (Note: Joseph Collins Jr.)
February 7, 2024 (Note: Only candidates on the ballot in Oklahoma were invited.)	Midwest City, Oklahoma	Libertarian Party of Oklahoma	N	P	N	P	N	N	N	N	N
February 17, 2024	Des Moines, Iowa	Libertarian Party of Iowa	A	A	A	A	P	A	A	P	A
February 18, 2024	Clemmons, North Carolina	Libertarian Party of North Carolina	A	P	P	P	A	P	A	P	A (Note: David 'TrimeTaveler' Dunlap was announced as a participate but did not attend)
February 23, 2024	St. Louis, Missouri	Libertarian Party of Missouri	A	P	A	A	A	A	A	P	A
February 24–25, 2024	Costa Mesa, California	Libertarian Party of California	N2	N2	N2	A	A	N1	A	N1	N1/2 (Note: Night One: Robert F. Kennedy Jr. (running as independent) Night Two: Cornel West (running as independent) Jill Stein (running for Green Party nomination) was announced as a night one participant but did not attend)
March 2, 2024	Harrisburg, Pennsylvania	Libertarian Party of Pennsylvania	P	P	A	P	P	P	P	P	A (Note: Joseph Collins Jr. was announced as a participant but did not attend)
March 3, 2024	New Brunswick, New Jersey	Libertarian Party of New Jersey	P	P	P	P	A	P	P	P	A
March 8, 2024	Elmhurst, Illinois	Libertarian Party of Illinois	P	P	P	P	P	A (Note: Was announced as a participant but did not attend)	P	P	A (Note: Joshua Rodriguez was announced as a participant but did not attend)
March 9, 2024	Flint, Michigan	Libertarian Party of Michigan	P	P	P	P	P	A (Note: Was announced as a participant but did not attend)	A	P	A
March 17, 2024	Watkins Glen, New York	Libertarian Party of New York	P	P	P	P	A	P	A	P	P (Note: Joseph Collins Jr. Jill Stein (running for Green Party nomination) was announced as a participant but did not attend)
March 23, 2024	Colorado Springs, Colorado	Libertarian Party of Colorado	A	P	P	P	A	P	A	P	A
April 6, 2024	Metairie, Louisiana	Libertarian Party of Louisiana	P	P	P	P	A	A (Note: Was announced as a participant but did not attend)	A	P	A (Note: Joseph Collins Jr. and Brett Dillon (running as an independent) were announced as participants but did not attend)
April 12, 2024 (Note: The four campaigns whose supporters raised the most money in the state's 'Vote with your dollars' campaign qualified for the debate)	Corpus Christi, Texas	Libertarian Party of Texas	N	N	P	P	N	P	N	P	N
April 14, 2024	Spokane, Washington	Libertarian Party of Washington	A	P	A	P	A	P (Note: Participated virtually)	P (Note: Participated virtually)	P (Note: Participated virtually)	A
April 19, 2024	Salt Lake City, Utah	Libertarian Party of Utah	P	A	P	A	A	A	A	P	A
April 20, 2024	Overland Park, Kansas	Libertarian Party of Kansas	A	P	A	P	A	P	P	P	A (Note: Joseph Collins Jr. was announced as a participant but did not attend)
April 21, 2024	Duluth, Minnesota	Libertarian Party of Minnesota	P	A (Note: Was announced as a participant but did not attend)	P	P	P	A (Note: Was announced as a participant but did not attend)	P	P	A
May 25, 2024 (Note: The five campaigns whose supporters raised the most money in the party's straw poll fundraiser qualified for the debate. The convention then voted on May 24 to add ter Maat, who finished in sixth.)	Washington, D.C.	United States Libertarian Party	P	N	P	P	N	P	P	P (Note: The five campaigns whose supporters raised the most money in the party's straw poll fundraiser qualified for the debate. The convention then voted on May 24 to add ter Maat, who finished in sixth.)	N

Candidate	Debates
ter Maat	24
Oliver	22
Mapstead	20
Hornberger	19
Rectenwald	16
Smith	12
Ballay	11
Olivier	5
Collins Jr.	2
Anderson	1

=== Forums ===
Forums among candidates for the 2024 Libertarian Party U.S. presidential nomination
Date	Place	Host	Participants								
P Participant. A Absent. O Out of race (exploring, suspended, or not yet entered).			Ballay	Hornberger	Mapstead	Oliver	Olivier	Rectenwald	Smith	Maat	Others
February 15, 2023	Online	Larry Sharpe	O	O	P	P (Note: Oliver was not officially in the race)	O	O	O	P	P (Note: Joshua Rodriguez)
March 26, 2023	Unknown, Washington	Libertarian Party of Washington	O	A	A	P (Note: Oliver was not officially in the race)	O	O	O	P	A
April 26, 2023	Online	Larry Sharpe	O	A (Note: Invited but did not attend)	P	P	O	O	O	P	P (Note: Joshua Rodriguez)
June 24, 2023	Lancaster, New Hampshire	PorcFest	O	A	P	A	O	O	O	P	A
October 21, 2023	Jacksonville, Florida	Libertarian Party of Duval County	A	A	P	P	O	P	P	P	A
December 10, 2023	Unknown, New Jersey	Libertarian Party of New Jersey	A	P	A	A	O	P	A	P	A

== Primary election polling ==
=== State polling ===
Poll source	Sample size	Date(s)	Hornberger	Mapstead	Oliver	Rectenwald	ter Maat	Others
Iowa State Fair Presidential Straw Poll	143	August 21, 2023	4%	2%	19%		2%	74%
Suffolk University Massachusetts Poll	10	February 2, 2024 – February 5, 2024	10%	0%	10%	0%	0%	70%

== Campaign finance ==
According to campaign finance laws, an individual must begin filing reports once they raise or spend more than $5,000. This fundraising table includes money raised and spent as of June 30, 2023. As Smith had not officially announced his campaign as of that date, he had not reported any fundraising. Fundraising reports for the third quarter had to be filed by October 15, 2023.

Overview of campaign financing for candidates in the 2024 Libertarian Party presidential primariesthrough June 30, 2023
Candidate	Total raised	Total raised since last quarter	Individual contributions			Debt	Spent	Spent since last quarter	COH
Candidate	Total raised	Total raised since last quarter	Total	Unitemized	Pct	Debt	Spent	Spent since last quarter	COH
Hornberger	$30,386	$12,870	$30,361	$1,611	5.3%	$0	$13,338	$3,807	$17,048
Mapstead	$158,414	$151,193	$2,300	$1,800	78.3%	$150,000	$94,497	$56,871	$101,543
Oliver	$24,164			$5,432	22.5%	$0	$24,058		$106
Smith, Joshua	$0	$0	$0	$0	0.0%	$0	$0	$0	$0
ter Maat	$126,805		$6,961	$1,937	27.8%	$0	$96,820		$29,985
Exotic (Note: Note that this table also includes fundraising data from Exotic's campaign as a Democratic presidential candidate.)	$10,294				100.0%	$0	$8,530		$1,764

== Schedule ==
Caucuses and primaries in the 2024 Libertarian Party presidential primaries
Date	Primaries/caucuses	Ref
January 13	Arizona convention	
January 15	Iowa caucus	
February 3	Alabama convention	
February 24	Mississippi convention	
February 27	Minnesota caucus	
March 2	Indiana convention	
March 2	Pennsylvania convention	
March 5	California primary	
March 5	Oklahoma primary	
March 5	Massachusetts primary	
March 5	North Carolina primary	
April 2	Connecticut straw poll	
May 5	Maine convention	
May 14	Nebraska primary	
May 24–26	Convention	
June 4	New Mexico primary	

=== Ballot access ===
The following is a table of which candidates have received ballot access in which states. Yes indicates that the candidate was on the ballot for the primary contest, indicates that the candidate was a recognized write-in candidate, and No indicates that the candidate did not appear on the ballot in that state's contest. indicates that a candidate withdrew before the election but was still listed on the ballot. States not appearing in the table did not hold Libertarian presidential primaries.

Ballot access in the 2024 Libertarian presidential preference contests
State	Date	Ballay	Hornberger	Mapstead	Oliver	Olivier	Rectenwald	Smith	ter Maat	Other	NOTA	Ref
AZ	Jan 13	No	Yes	Yes	Yes	No	Yes	Yes	Yes	No	Yes	
IA (caucus)	Jan 15	Ballot access not required										
AL	Feb 3	Yes	Yes	Yes	Yes	No	Yes	No	Yes	Yes (Note: Joseph Collins Jr.)	No	
MS	Feb 24	Yes	Yes	Yes	Yes	Yes	Yes	Yes	Yes	Yes (Note: Joseph Collins Jr.)	Yes	
MN	Feb 27	All FEC filed candidates qualified										
IN	Mar 2	No	Yes	Yes	Yes	No	Yes	Yes	Yes	No	Yes	
PA	Mar 2	Yes	Yes	Write-in	Yes	Yes	Yes	Yes	Yes	Yes (Note: Joseph Collins Jr All write-ins counted)	No	
MA	Mar 5	No	Yes	Yes	Yes	No	Yes	No	Yes	No	Yes	
NC	Mar 5	Yes	Yes	Yes	Yes	No	Yes	Yes	Yes	Yes (Note: Toad Anderson, David "TrimeTaveler" Dunlap, Beau Lindsey)	Yes	
CA	Mar 5	Yes	No	No	Write-in	No	No	No	No	No	No	
OK	Mar 5	No	Yes	No	Yes	No	No	No	No	No	No	
CT	April 2	Yes	Yes	Yes	Yes	No	Yes	Yes	Yes	Yes (Note: Joseph Collins Jr.)	Yes	
ME	May 5	Write-in	Yes	Yes	Yes	Write-in	Write-in	Yes	Yes	(Note: All write-ins counted)	No	
NE	May 14	Yes	Yes	Yes	Yes	No	Yes	No	Yes	No	No	
NM	Jun 4	No	No	Yes	No	No	No	No	No	No	Yes	

== See also ==
- Third party and independent candidates for the 2024 United States presidential election
- 2024 Democratic Party presidential primaries
- 2024 Republican Party presidential primaries
- 2024 Green Party presidential primaries
- 2024 Constitution Party presidential primaries
- 2024 United States presidential election
