= Art Olivier =

American politician (born 1957)

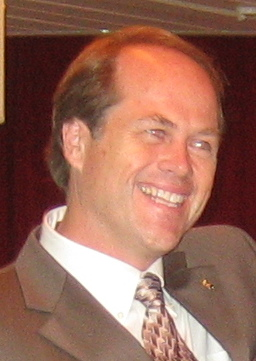
- Olivier in 2006

Mayor of Bellflower, California
- In office 1998–1999
- Preceded by: Ruth Gilson
- Succeeded by: Joseph E. Cvetko

Mayor Pro Tem of Bellflower, California
- In office 1997–1998
- Preceded by: Ken Cleveland
- Succeeded by: Joseph E. Cvetko

Councilman in Bellflower, California
- In office 1994–1997
- Preceded by: Ray T. Smith
- Succeeded by: Ray T. Smith

Personal details
- Born: August 24, 1957 (age 69) Lynwood, California, U.S.
- Party: Libertarian
- Spouse: Joyce (m. 1987 div. 2022)
- Children: 3
- Education: Cerritos College

Arthur C. Olivier (born August 24, 1957) is an American politician who was the Libertarian candidate for Vice President of the United States in the 2000 U.S. presidential election as the running mate of presidential candidate Harry Browne.

Olivier later unsuccessfully ran in the 2024 Libertarian Party presidential primaries for the party's presidential nomination. Olivier served as a councilman (1994–1997), mayor pro tempore (1997–1998) and mayor (1998–1999) of Bellflower, California, a Los Angeles suburb with 77,000 residents. During his five years on the Bellflower City Council (1994–1999), Olivier privatized the city's tree trimming, crossing guards, street sweeping and building department. He eliminated the city's lighting tax assessment and did not allow eminent domain to be exercised while on the council.

A graduate of Cerritos College with a degree in Design Technology, Olivier is a realtor with Cogburn Realty.

== Views ==
During the campaign for vice president, Olivier advocated smaller government, "We have to reduce the size of the federal government back to the size of its constitutional limits." Critical of the U.S. foreign policy of interventionism, he said he would like the government to return U.S. troops from abroad and make the Department of Defense get back to defending us, and not be a Department of Offense that bombs little countries." "I don't believe we should be the world's policeman." He believes that U.S. foreign policy should be governed by an avoidance of “entangling alliances." "The conflicts this country has entered into cause others to look badly upon America."

Olivier ran uncontested for governor in the 2006 Libertarian primary. He received 114,329 votes (1.3%) in his loss to incumbent Arnold Schwarzenegger in the general election. Olivier criticized Governor Schwarzenegger for passing a budget that was “30% larger than the one that got Governor Gray Davis recalled just three years ago.” Olivier's main earned media was talk radio, advertising his opposition to illegal immigration. Olivier favored having the government build a wall on the border and cut off all tax-funded programs to illegal immigrants.

== Campaigns ==
=== 1990 California State Assembly election, District 54 ===
In 1990, Olivier was the libertarian nominee for California State Assembly’s 54th District. He ran against incumbent Democratic assemblyman William H. Murray Jr., Republican Emily Hart-Holifield, and Peace and Freedom nominee Norman E. Lynn. Olivier came in 3rd place behind Murray and Hart-Holifield with 3,520 votes, or 5.87%.

=== Local Bellflower Elections ===
In 1992, Olivier ran for Bellflower, California city council, but lost. He ran again two years later in 1994, this time winning. In 1997, the city council chose Olivier to become the Mayor Pro Tem, and a year later in 1998 they chose him to become Mayor. In 1999, Olivier retired from Bellflower politics.

=== 2000 Libertarian vice presidential nominee ===
On July 4, 2000, Olivier was chosen as the Libertarian Party's vice presidential nominee for the 2000 Presidential Election. He beat Steve Kubby on the second ballot. He ran with Harry Browne. They got 5th place and 384,431 votes.

=== 2006 California gubernatorial campaign ===
In the 2006 California gubernatorial election, Olivier ran against Arnold Schwarzenegger and Phil Angelides. He said he appeared on more talk radio shows than all other candidates combined. Olivier finished in 4th place. He got around 1% of the vote.

=== 2010 California State Assembly election, District 50 ===
Olivier ran for the Democratic nomination for California State Assembly’s 50th District in 2010. He lost to incumbent Ricardo Lara in the primary election.

=== 2024 Libertarian presidential campaign ===
Olivier ran for president in the 2024 Libertarian Party primaries. He earned 5 votes in the primaries, and was a candidate in Iowa and Pennsylvania, and a write-in candidate in North Carolina.

In the first round of voting in the 2024 Libertarian National Convention, Olivier got 4 delegate votes. He was eliminated in the first round. The nomination eventually went to Chase Oliver.

== Operation Terror ==
Olivier is supportive of the 9/11 truth movement. In 2012, he wrote and produced the thriller film Operation Terror, which depicted a fictionalized version of the September 11 attacks in New York City, 2001. The movie's plot centered on a group of American government insiders that organized and assembled a group of people to attack the World Trade Center and the Pentagon. In writing Operation Terror, Olivier used dialogue taken from transcripts of the investigation by the 9/11 Commission and based the film's characters on real-life players in the 9/11 attack.

The film premiered on September 11, 2012, in Los Angeles, and received the Honorable Mention Award at the International Film Festival for Peace, Inspiration and Equality and won the Genre Film: Thriller award at the International Movie Awards. The film's director, Paul Cross, was also nominated for Best Director at the Fajr International Film Festival.

Party political offices
Preceded by Jo Jorgensen	Libertarian nominee for Vice President of the United States; 2000	Succeeded by Richard Campagna
