= Michael Rectenwald =

American scholar (born 1959)

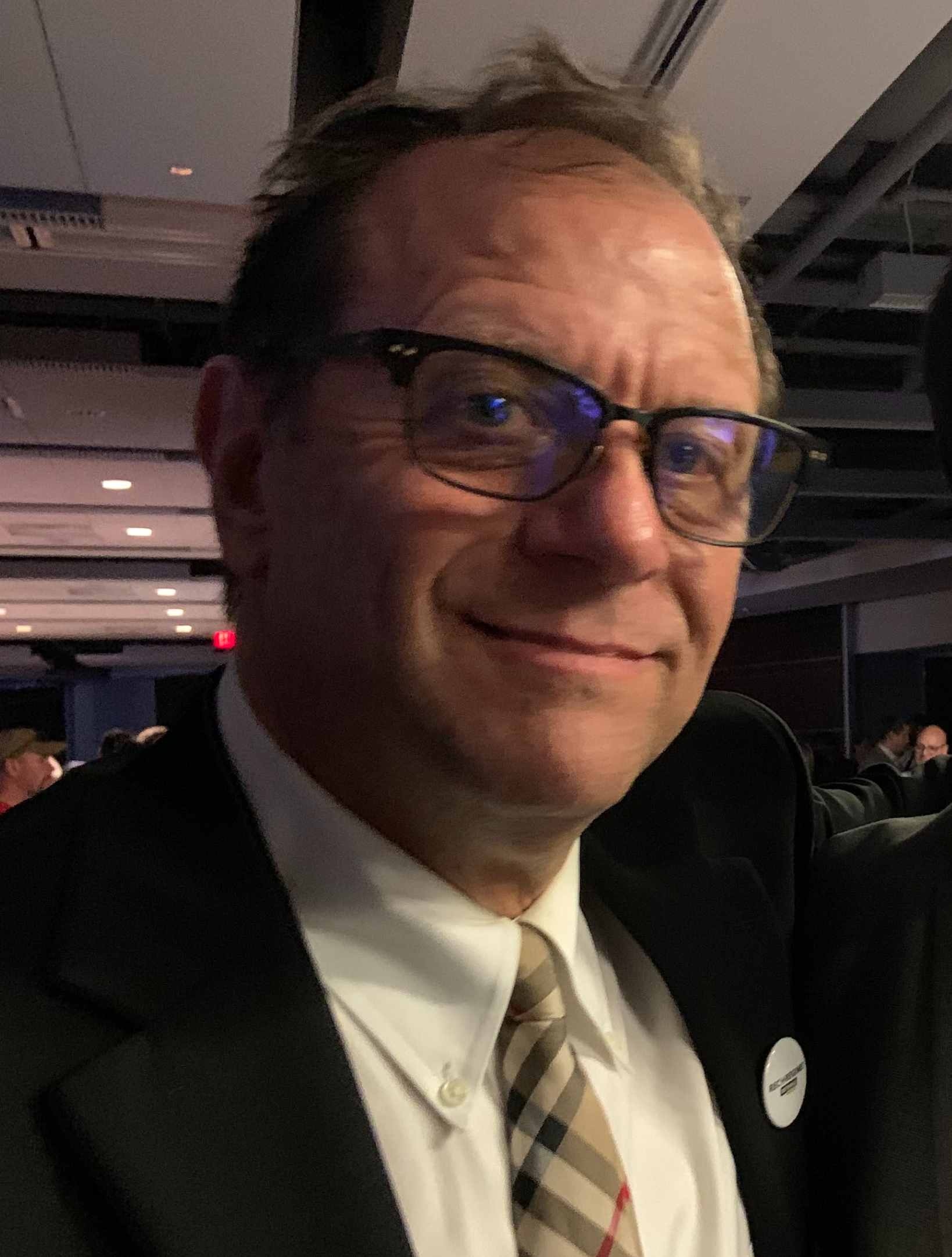
- Rectenwald at the 2024 Libertarian National Convention
- Occupations: Academic; author; political activist
- Political party: Libertarian

Academic background
- Education: University of Pittsburgh (BA); Case Western Reserve University (MA); Carnegie Mellon University (PhD)

Academic work
- Institutions: North Carolina Central University; New York University
- Main interests: Secularism

Michael D. Rectenwald is a right-wing American author, former professor, and lobbyist. A member of the Mises Caucus of the Libertarian Party, he has written about 19th-century British secularism and is a critic of the contemporary social justice movement.

In 2025, Rectenwald founded the Anti-Zionist America PAC (AZAPAC), a political action committee. According to a 2026 report in The Intercept, AZAPAC has endorsed far-right figures and Hitler apologists. His most recent book addresses "the Jewish question".

== Early life and education ==
Rectenwald's 2018 memoir states that he is the seventh of nine children. He is Catholic. He has said he was raised in a German and Italian neighborhood in Pittsburgh, and that he "didn't know what a Jewish person was until I was an adult, frankly".

Rectenwald's undergraduate studies in English included an apprenticeship with Beat Generation poet Allen Ginsberg at Naropa University (formerly Naropa Institute) during the 1979–80 school year. He graduated cum laude from the University of Pittsburgh in 1983 with a B.A. in English literature. In 1997, Rectenwald received a master's degree in English literature from Case Western Reserve University. In 2004, Carnegie Mellon University conferred upon Rectenwald a Ph.D. in literary and cultural studies. In the span of one year, he published three books.

== Career ==
Rectenwald was a Professor of Liberal and Global Liberal Studies at New York University for more than ten years before retiring in January 2019.

On September 12, 2016, Rectenwald created the anonymous Twitter account @antipcnyuprof, tweeting on the topic of social justice ideology on North American colleges and universities. A student reporter for the Washington Square News, New York University's weekly student newspaper, discovered him; he subsequently gave an interview revealing himself as the faculty member behind the account. At the time, he described his politics as "left-communist".

In a November 3, 2016 Washington Post op-ed, Rectenwald claimed that two days after the student interview, he was summoned by NYU Liberal Studies Dean Fred Schwarzbach and was "strongly encouraged to take a paid leave of absence". Schwarzbach denied Rectenwald's claims and posted all email correspondence between the two from November 1 through November 11, which showed Rectenwald requesting the leave himself. Rectenwald went on paid leave in September 2016. In January 2018, he sued NYU and four of its professors for defamation. The case was dismissed with prejudice against Rectenwald. In October 2018, Rectenwald invited Milo Yiannopoulos to speak in one of his classes. Yiannopoulos's visit was postponed for reasons of safety.

=== Research contributions ===
Rectenwald has written on the origins of the movement called secularism, which was founded in London in 1851 by George Jacob Holyoake. In "Secularism and the cultures of nineteenth-century scientific naturalism", Rectenwald argued that Holyoake's secularism "represents an important early stage of scientific naturalism". In Holyoake's Secularism, Rectenwald locates a precursor for Charles Taylor's version of secularity as the immanent frame that structures the conditions of belief and unbelief in modernity. According to a review in Victorian Studies, "Rectenwald thus offers a revisionist interpretation that, rather than understanding Holyoake's leadership of the free thought movement as a failed rhetorical attempt to make society more secular, sees it as marking a distinct moment in modernity."

== Views ==
=== Critique of social justice and leftism in academia ===
In 2018, the conservative New English Review Press published Rectenwald's memoir, Springtime for Snowflakes: Social Justice and Its Postmodern Parentage. In the memoir, Rectenwald critiques the contemporary social justice culture in academia, arguing that it has promoted an authoritarian and dogmatic culture in parts of academia. He was later dropped by the publisher.

=== Israel and Jews ===
Rectenwald has been heavily critical of Israel and Zionism. He has criticized the United States' support for Israel in the Gaza war, and stated, "That's why you have chants like 'Death to America' resounding in Iran. It's not because they hate us intrinsically, it's because of our affiliation and unconditional support of Israel."

Rectenwald has self-published a novel called The Cabal Question, which he originally wanted to call "The Jewish Question". In the book, according to The Intercept:

"a former professor finds his worldview transformed when a friend "thrusts him into the JQ", or Jewish question, as the book's Amazon summary puts it, working with "a steadfast ex-occultist turned Christian nationalist to trace the strands of the cabal's reach". The story mirrors his own evolution of getting "J-pilled", or "Jew-pilled", Rectenwald has said, though he insists the novel is not about promoting antisemitism but rather "a Christian redemption story".

Rectenwald has posted about the "Jewish mafia" on X at least 43 times. He has claimed that the 2023 October 7 attacks on Israel were a "false flag" operation. In March 2026, Rectenwald criticized the Iran war, saying, "Don't die for 'israel'. Don't die for the Syn@gogue of S@t@n".

== Anti-Zionist America PAC ==
In 2025, Rectenwald launched the Anti-Zionist America PAC (AZAPAC), a political action committee. The organization describes its mission as opposing the influence of pro-Israel lobbying groups in American politics. Rectenwald said, "We're not like leftist anti-Zionists, calling for 'from the river to the sea' and all this nonsense. We are not trying to say the State of Israel should not exist. That is not our concern. Our concern is the U.S. government only, and what it's doing."

By the end of 2025, AZAPAC had raised $111,556. According to The Intercept, AZAPAC has welcomed far-right figures, including Nick Fuentes. The Jewish Telegraphic Agency reported that AZAPAC has endorsed candidates who have promoted conspiracy theories about Israel being behind the September 11 attacks and the assassination of Charlie Kirk.

=== 2026 endorsements ===
For the 2026 United States elections, AZAPAC has endorsed anti-Zionist candidates. Its endorsed candidates consist of a mixture of Republicans, Democrats, and Libertarians; however, Rectenwald has stated that the PAC is more focused on Republicans.

As of February 2026, at least two candidates have rejected AZAPAC's endorsement, including Anthony Aguilar (G), a candidate for the House of Representatives in NC-13. Aguilar's campaign stated that anti-Zionists "are falsely accused on antisemitism on a regular basis... For that reason, we want to avoid being associated with any group whose statements or actions raise credible concerns of actual antisemitism."

As of June 2026, its endorsed candidates have included:

U.S. gubernatorial elections

- Alicia Olivia Lapp (R) - CA
- Casey Putsch (R) - OH

U.S. House of Representatives

- Monica Alponte (L) - AZ-1
- Dan Bilzerian (R) - FL-6
- Bernard Taylor (D) - FL-21
- Rick Shepard (R) - NV-2
- Jose Vega (D) - NY-15
- John Hancock (L) - OH-1

U.S. Senate

- Michael Faris (R) - KY
- Nick Hankins (R) - OK

== 2024 presidential campaign ==
Michael Rectenwald 2024 presidential campaign
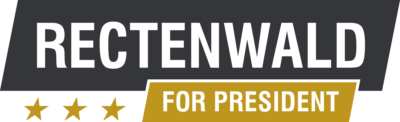
- Campaign: 2024 Libertarian Party presidential primaries
- Candidate: Michael Rectenwald; Clint Russell
- Affiliation: Libertarian Party (Mises Caucus)
- Status: Lost nomination
- Announced: August 28, 2023
- Suspended: May 26, 2024

In 2023, Rectenwald filed to run for president of the United States seeking the Libertarian presidential nomination in the 2024 U.S. presidential election. He finished second in delegate votes during the 2024 Libertarian National Convention, losing to Chase Oliver in the sixth round of elimination voting. He admitted to eating an edible gummy during part of the convention.

== Works ==
=== Books ===
- Rectenwald, Michael, and Lisa Carl. Academic Writing, Real World Topics. Peterborough, Ont.: Broadview Press. (May 28, 2015).
- Rectenwald, Michael, Rochelle Almeida and George Levine, eds. Global Secularisms in a Post-Secular Age. Boston: De Gruyter. (September 25, 2015).
- Nineteenth-Century British Secularism: Science, Religion and Literature. Houndsmills, Basingstoke, Hampshire, UK; New York: Palgrave Macmillan. (2016).
- Rectenwald, Michael and Lisa Carl. Academic Writing, Real World Topics. (Concise Edition). Peterborough, Ont: Broadview Press. (July 20, 2016).
- Springtime for Snowflakes: Social Justice and Its Postmodern Parentage. Nashville. TN; London, UK: New English Review Press. (2018).
- Google Archipelago: The Digital Gulag and the Simulation of Freedom. Nashville, TN; London, UK: New English Review Press. (September 30, 2019).
- Rectenwald, Michael. Beyond Woke. New English Review Press. (May 18, 2020).
- Thought Criminal. New English Review Press. (December 1, 2020).
- The Great Reset. World Encounter Institute/New English Review Press. (January 10, 2023).
- The Cabal Question. Independently published (April 13, 2025).

=== Selected articles ===
- "Reading Around the Kids". In Constance Coiner and Diana Hume George, eds. The Family Track: Keeping Your Faculties while You Mentor, Nurture, Teach, and Serve. University of Illinois Press, (1998): 107–13.
- "Local Histories, Broader Implications". College Composition and Communication 60, no. 2 (2008): 448.
- Smythe, Thomas W. and Michael Rectenwald. "Craig on God and Morality". International Philosophical Quarterly. 51.3. 203 (September 2011): 331–38.
- "Secularism". In Margaret Harris, ed. George Eliot in Context. Cambridge: Cambridge University Press (2013): 271–78.
- "Secularism and the Cultures of Nineteenth-century Scientific Naturalism". The British Journal for the History of Science. 46.2 (June 2013): 231–54.
- "Mid-Nineteenth-Century British Secularism and its Contemporary Post-Secular Implications". In Michael Rectenwald, Rochelle Almeida and George Levine, eds. Global Secularisms in a Post- Secular Age. Boston: De Gruyter (2015): 43–64.
- "Introduction: Global Secularisms in a Post-Secular Age". In Michael Rectenwald, Rochelle Almeida and George Levine, eds. Global Secularisms in a Post- Secular Age. Boston and Berlin: De Gruyter (2015): 1–24.
- "Secularism as Modern Secularity". In Ryan T. Cragun, Lori Fazzino, Christel Manning, eds. Organized Secularism in the United States. Boston and Berlin: De Gruyter (November 2017): 31–56.
- "'Social Justice' and Its Postmodern Parentage". Academic Questions. 31.2. (April 10, 2018): 130–139.
