= Fred Schwarzbach =

American academic

- Education: Columbia University; University College London
- Occupation: Academic
- Employer: New York University

Fred Schwarzbach is an American academic. He is a professor of Victorian literature at New York University, and the former dean of NYU Liberal Studies.

== Selected works ==
- Schwarzbach, Fred (1979). Dickens and the City. London, U.K.: Athlone Press. ISBN 9780485111743. OCLC 891185199.
- Nadel, Ira; Schwarzbach, Fred, eds. (1980). Victorian Artists and the City: A Collection of Critical Essays. New York: Pergamon Press. ISBN 9780080233819. OCLC 768122855.
