= Chase Oliver =

American politician (born 1985)

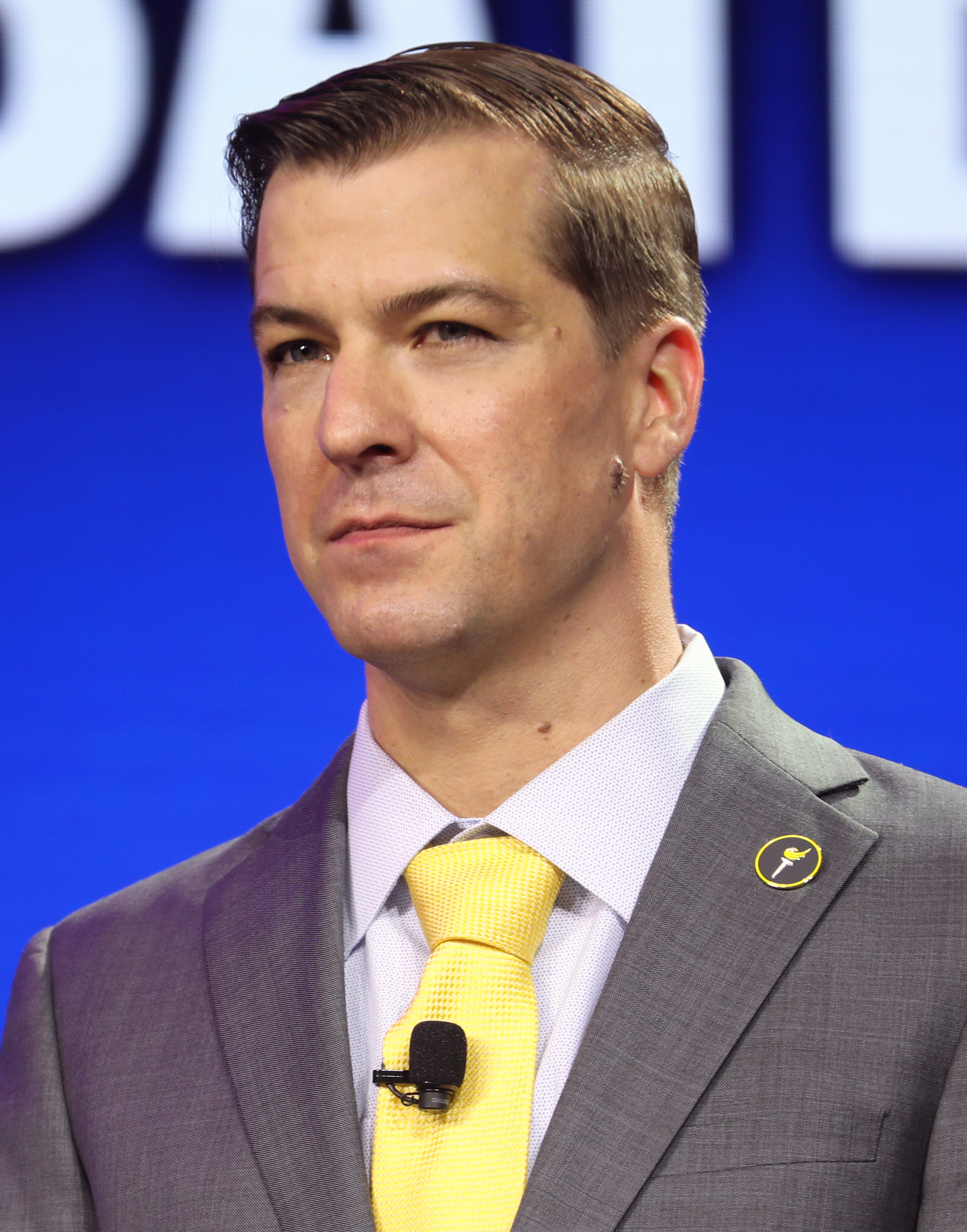
- Oliver in 2024
- Born: Chase Russell Oliver; August 16, 1985 (age 41); Nashville, Tennessee, U.S.
- Political party: Libertarian (2010–present)
- Other political affiliations: Democratic (2003–2009); Independent (2009–2010)

Chase Russell Oliver (born August 16, 1985) is an American political activist and politician who was the nominee of the Libertarian Party for the 2024 United States presidential election. Oliver finished fifth in the popular vote with 0.4% and 650,126 votes. Oliver was the Libertarian candidate for the 2022 United States Senate election in Georgia and the 2020 Georgia's 5th congressional district special election. The Gazette described him as a "pro-gun, pro-police reform, pro-choice Libertarian" who is "armed and gay".

In Georgia's 2022 Senate election, Oliver received over 2% of the popular vote. Supporters of both major parties characterized him as a spoiler candidate who forced Raphael Warnock into a run-off against Herschel Walker, which Warnock narrowly won.

== Early life ==
Oliver was born on August 16, 1985, in Nashville, Tennessee. He worked in the restaurant business for 13 years prior to his involvement in political activism.

== Activism ==
On May 15, 2023, Oliver spoke at the Atlanta City Council meeting to oppose Cop City. During his speech, Oliver highlighted the growing distrust between people and governments and their police forces. Oliver spoke out against the over-militarization of police and qualified immunity. He also advocated for the Atlanta City Council to improve existing training facilities instead of clear-cutting forests that had previously been designated by the City Council as public open space.

On September 5, 2023, Oliver spoke at the Columbia, South Carolina City Council meeting in opposition to regulatory hurdles that prevent people from feeding the homeless. He advocated for the Columbia City Council, and other city councils across the country, to address regulatory barriers to feeding and supporting homeless Americans.

== Political career ==
Oliver supported Barack Obama in the 2008 U.S. presidential election but ended his support after Obama continued the Iraq War. Oliver joined the Libertarian Party in 2010 after meeting several members of the party at an Atlanta Pride Festival.

=== 2020 U.S. House campaign ===
Oliver first ran for public office in 2020, as the Libertarian nominee for the 2020 Georgia's 5th congressional district special election to replace John Lewis, who had died from pancreatic cancer earlier that year. He won 2% of the vote and was eliminated during the blanket primary.

=== 2022 U.S. Senate campaign ===
After becoming the Libertarian nominee for the 2022 U.S. Senate election in Georgia, Oliver faced off against the incumbent Democratic Raphael Warnock and Republican Party challenger Herschel Walker. Oliver was the first openly gay Senate candidate in Georgia.

On October 16, 2022, Oliver attended a debate hosted by Georgia Public Broadcasting and debated against Warnock, as well as an empty podium representing Walker, who had declined to attend the debate.

On election day, Oliver received over 2% of the popular vote. Opponents contended that he was a spoiler candidate and that his votes forced the Georgia senate race into a run-off. In the runoff election, he declined to endorse either Warnock or Walker, while offering to host an internet forum between the two candidates. Rolling Stone called him the most influential Libertarian of the year.

=== 2024 presidential campaign ===
Chase Oliver 2024 presidential campaign
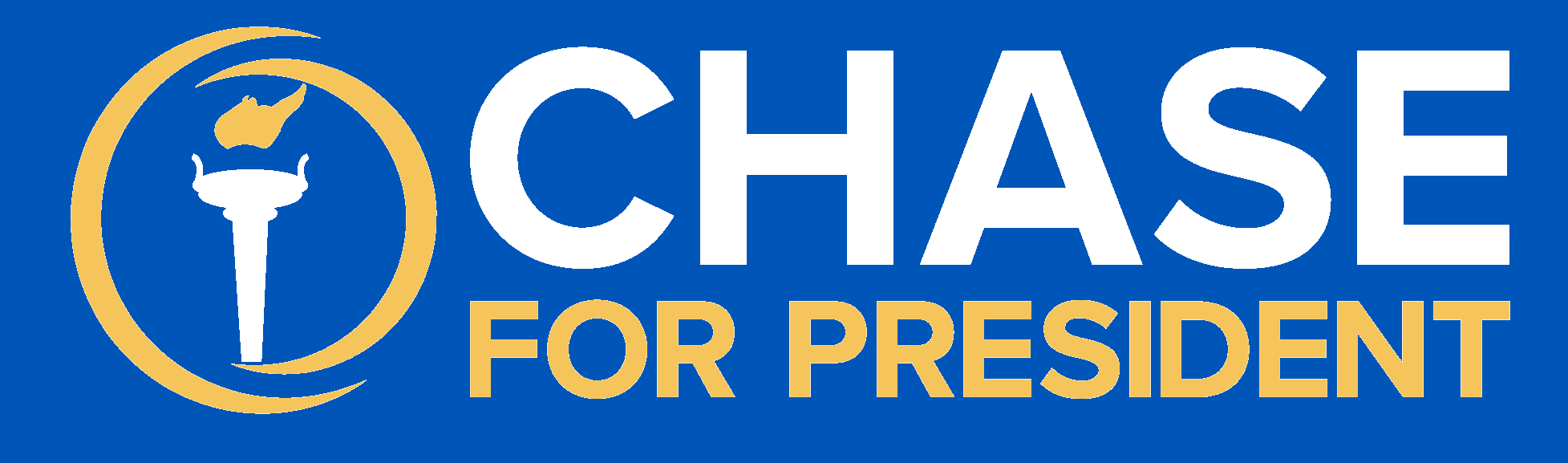
- Campaign: 2024 Libertarian Party presidential primaries 2024 United States presidential election
- Candidate: Chase Oliver
- Affiliation: Libertarian Party
- Announced: April 4, 2023
- Receipts: US$268,981.07

Website
- https://www.votechaseoliver.com/

On December 2, 2022, Oliver announced his formation of an exploratory committee to inquire into a possible run for the Libertarian presidential nomination in the 2024 U.S. presidential election. He formally declared his candidacy on April 4, 2023.

Oliver campaigned extensively in Iowa during the summer of 2023. On August 19, 2023, he spoke at the Des Moines Register Political Soapbox, becoming the first-ever third-party presidential candidate to speak at the event.

Oliver filed to run in Oklahoma's "first Libertarian presidential primary election since the party was formally recognized in 2016". Alongside fellow Libertarian primary candidate Jacob Hornberger, Oliver achieved ballot access by collecting signatures from voters in each Congressional district. He won the Oklahoma primary, which was held on Super Tuesday, on March 5, 2024, with 61% of the vote.

In January 2024, Oliver and fellow Libertarian presidential primary candidate Lars Mapstead successfully worked together to secure major party status and ballot access for the Libertarian Party of Maine. Afterwards, Oliver went to Iowa in order to campaign ahead of the 2024 Iowa Libertarian presidential caucuses. He won the Iowa Caucus with 42.7% of the vote.

On February 29, 2024, Oliver participated in a presidential candidates debate hosted by the Free & Equal Elections Foundation, alongside Party for Socialism and Liberation nominee Claudia De la Cruz, Green Party candidates Jill Stein and Jasmine Sherman, and fellow Libertarian candidate Lars Mapstead.

Oliver won the Libertarian nomination on the seventh ballot at the National Convention, defeating Michael Rectenwald. Oliver designated Mike ter Maat as his preferred choice of running mate.

John Stossel has expressed support for Oliver over Democratic Party candidate Kamala Harris and Republican Party candidate Donald Trump in 2024.

Oliver ultimately finished in fifth place, behind Trump, Harris, Stein, and withdrawn independent Robert F. Kennedy Jr. His best performance was in North Dakota, where he secured 1.69% of the vote.

=== 2026 gubernatorial campaign ===
In January 2026, Oliver was nominated as the Libertarian candidate in the 2026 Georgia gubernatorial election.

== Political positions ==
Oliver is considered part of the traditional wing of the Libertarian Party, and is a member of the Classical Liberal Caucus.

=== Abortion ===
Oliver is pro-choice, although he is opposed to taxpayer funding of abortions and supports the Hyde Amendment. He believes that abortion should be legal nationwide, and he has said he would support legislation to make it so.

=== Clemency for Ross Ulbricht ===
Ulbricht's conviction became a cause célèbre in American libertarian circles. In the November 2024 issue of Reason magazine Chase Oliver said in an interview: "I would like to see [Trump], if he were elected, commute Ross Ulbricht's sentence. Frankly, if I were president, I would give him a full pardon."

=== Climate change ===
Oliver supports letting the free market find the solution to climate change. He contends that if businesses are left alone, they will be incentivized to develop technologies that will eventually replace current carbon-based fuels.

=== Commons ===
Oliver has proposed selling off federal lands to help reduce federal debt.

=== Criminal justice reform ===
Oliver supports ending qualified immunity for law enforcement at the federal level. Oliver also supports ending the death penalty and federal mandatory minimum sentencing.

=== Economy ===
Oliver supports free trade, and opposes tariffs. He also supports a balanced federal budget and reducing inflation.

=== Education ===
Oliver supports abolishing the United States Department of Education, and advocates "for more choice in the education marketplace on a state-by-state basis". Oliver also opposes the federal backing of student loans, and supports allowing student loan debt to be dischargeable in bankruptcy.

=== Electoral reform ===
Oliver is a strong supporter of ranked-choice voting in the United States, which he has said would have prevented the 2022 U.S. Senate election in Georgia from going to a run-off by allowing voters to rank their preferred candidates when they voted the first time. He has also stated that ranked-choice voting would save millions of taxpayer dollars by allowing run-offs to be instant, while ensuring that winning candidates always get above 50% of the vote.

=== Foreign affairs ===
Oliver opposes American military aid to Israel and Ukraine. He has labeled the Israeli offensive in Gaza as a genocide. Oliver also supports the closure of American overseas military bases. John Stossel called Oliver "the most anti-war candidate" in the 2024 presidential election.

=== Gun rights ===
During a 2022 debate with Warnock, Oliver expressed his support for gun rights, stating: "Armed gays are harder to oppress, and they're harder to bash." Oliver opposes bans on bump stocks. John Stossel has further affirmed that "Oliver supports gun rights."

=== Healthcare ===
Oliver has said the Affordable Care Act did not lower the rise in health insurance costs "and never will". He wants to slowly phase out both Medicare and Medicaid over a span of more than eight years.

=== Homelessness ===
Oliver supports removing regulatory barriers that ostensibly prevent people and organizations from feeding homeless people.

=== Immigration ===
Oliver supports an "Ellis Island-style immigration" system, stating: "If you're coming here to work and be peaceful, it's not my business." He supports a pathway to citizenship for undocumented immigrants.

=== LGBT rights ===
Oliver opposes the government interfering with certain transgender health care decisions made by a parent, child, and doctor. However, he has expressed opposition to gender-affirming surgery for those under the age of 18.

He opposes laws targeting drag shows, calling drag an "art form" that "can range from completely family friendly to something quite explicit — just like cinema, music, visual arts" and making the argument that if a parent can take their child to see The Passion of the Christ, they can take their children to see drag if they choose to. He believes that existing obscenity laws, along with parental supervision, are sufficient to protect children from objectionable content. He also opposes state mandates related to the participation of transgender girls in women's sports, believing that such decisions should be made by individual sports leagues and not the government.

=== Privacy and civil liberties ===
Oliver supports abolishing the Transportation Security Administration along with repealing the Patriot Act and the FISA Amendments Act of 2008.

=== Social Security ===
Oliver has called Social Security a "Ponzi scheme". He wants to preserve existing Social Security benefits for those currently retired or about to retire by maintaining the employer contribution to Social Security as long as necessary, but eliminate the worker contribution and Social Security benefits for younger workers to gradually phase out the program.

=== Third parties ===
Oliver was a contributing author in the September 23, 2023, article "Do Third Parties Help or Harm Democracy?", published by the nonprofit news organization Divided We Fall. In the article, Oliver discussed the strategic position the Libertarian Party holds for the 2024 election season, third-party ballot access, and how the Libertarian Party platform parallels important issues of other third-party platforms, namely the Green Party of the United States and Forward Party, such as ranked choice voting, immigration, cannabis legalization, and LGBTQ+ rights.

=== War on drugs ===
Oliver advocates for ending the war on drugs and supports the legalization of marijuana. Oliver also supports repealing the Controlled Substances Act and supports decriminalizing all drugs by passing the Drug Policy Reform Act.

== Personal life ==
As of 2023, Oliver resides in a suburb of Atlanta. He said he has a "deep faith in the gospel". He is openly gay.

== Electoral history ==
Georgia's 5th congressional district special election, September 29, 2020
| Party | Candidate | Votes | % |
|---|---|---|---|
| Democratic | Kwanza Hall | 11,104 | 31.75% |
| Democratic | Robert Michael Franklin Jr. | 9,987 | 28.55% |
| Democratic | Mable Thomas | 6,692 | 19.13% |
| Democratic | Keisha Waites | 4,255 | 12.17% |
| Democratic | Barrington Martin II | 1,944 | 5.56% |
| Libertarian | Chase Oliver | 712 | 2.04% |
| Independent | Steven Muhammad | 282 | 0.8% |
| Total votes | | 34,967 | 100.00% |

2022 United States Senate election in Georgia
| Party | Candidate | Votes | % | ±% |
|---|---|---|---|---|
| Democratic | Raphael Warnock (incumbent) | 1,946,117 | 49.44% | +1.05% |
| Republican | Herschel Walker | 1,908,442 | 48.49% | −0.88% |
| Libertarian | Chase Oliver | 81,365 | 2.07% | +1.35% |
| Total votes | | 3,935,924 | 100.0% | |

Party political offices
| Preceded by Jo Jorgensen | Libertarian nominee for President of the United States; 2024 | Most recent |
