= Libertarian National Convention =

United States political event

The Libertarian National Convention is held every two years by the Libertarian Party (United States) to choose members of the Libertarian National Committee (LNC), and to conduct other party business. In presidential election years, the convention delegates enact a platform and nominate the Libertarian presidential and vice-presidential candidates who then face the nominees of other parties in the November general election.

While most delegates to the Republican National Convention and the Democratic National Convention are tied to particular candidates, delegates to the Libertarian National Convention are free to choose, as was previously the case for the larger parties. Accordingly, Libertarian National Conventions place less emphasis on festivities and spinning the press, though some of each may be found. The complete convention is televised by C-SPAN with additional broadcast television coverage of the presidential nominating process. None of the above is always an option on all ballots.

== Conventions ==
=== 1972 ===
The first Libertarian National Convention was held in 1972 in Denver, Colorado. John Hospers and Theodora Nathan were nominated presidential and vice presidential candidates, respectively. The party received the first electoral vote won by a woman, cast by (faithless Republican elector) Roger MacBride who became the Libertarian party's presidential candidate for the 1976 election.

=== 1973 ===
The 1973 Convention was held in Strongsville, Ohio, from June 8 to 10. Over 175 were in attendance.

=== 1974 ===
The 1974 convention adopted the Dallas Accord which sought to accommodate supporters of both anarcho-capitalism and minarchism.

=== 1975 ===
The 1975 convention was held at the Statler-Hilton hotel in New York City. Roger MacBride was nominated for president. After initially selecting None of the Above, the convention's delegates nominated David Bergland for vice president.

=== 1976 ===
The 1976 convention was held in Washington, D.C., from September 23 to 26, 1976.

=== 1977 ===
The 1977 convention was held at the Palace Hotel in San Francisco, California.

=== 1978 ===
The 1978 convention was held at the Copley Plaza Hotel in Boston Massachusetts.

=== 1979 ===
The 1979 convention was held at the Bonaventure Hotel in Los Angeles and nominated Ed Clark for president and billionaire David H. Koch for vice president.

=== Alternative '80 ===
The 1980 convention was held at the Century City Hotel in Los Angeles, California, and via satellite. Unlike other Libertarian Party conventions, its primary purpose was promotional.

=== 1981 ===
The 1981 convention was held in Denver, Colorado.

=== 1983 ===
David Bergland was selected as the 1984 presidential nominee at the 1983 National Convention.

=== 1985 ===
The 1985 convention was held in Phoenix, Arizona.

=== 1987 ===
The 1987 Libertarian National Convention was held the first weekend in September in Seattle, Washington. At the convention, the party was split between conservative and liberal factions. Ron Paul, representing the former, was nominated as the Libertarian Party's 1988 presidential candidate on the first ballot with 196 of the 368 votes cast. His closest opponent, Native American activist Russell Means, received 120 votes. Andre Marrou was selected as Paul's running mate as the candidate for vice president without opposition.

=== 1989 ===
The 1989 convention was held in Philadelphia, Pennsylvania.

=== 1991 ===
The 1991 Libertarian National Convention was held in Chicago the last weekend in August, and nominated Andre Marrou as the party's 1992 candidate for president.

=== 1993 ===
The 1993 convention was held in Salt Lake City, Utah.

=== 1996 ===
The 1996 Libertarian National Convention was held the first weekend of July in Washington D.C., and nominated Harry Browne as its presidential candidate.

=== 1998 ===
The 1998 convention was held in Washington D.C.

=== 2000 ===
The 2000 convention was held in Anaheim, California, from June 30 to July 4. Harry Browne was again chosen as the party's presidential candidate, becoming the first Libertarian Party candidate to run twice for president of the United States.

=== 2002 ===
The 2002 convention was held in Indianapolis, Indiana, from July 3 to 7. Key Note Speaker: Dr. Ron Paul.

=== 2004 ===
The 2004 convention was held at the Marriott Marquis Hotel in Atlanta, Georgia, Memorial Day weekend, May 27 to May 31. Michael Badnarik was chosen as the party's presidential candidate, beating out Gary Nolan and Aaron Russo on the third ballot; Richard Campagna was chosen as the party's vice-presidential candidate over Tamara Millay, and Michael Dixon was elected chair of the LNC.

=== 2006 ===
The 2006 convention was held at the Hilton Portland & Executive Tower in Portland, Oregon, July 1–2. Delegates chose (in a "retain or delete" vote process) to eliminate about three-quarters of the specific planks in the party's platform

Speakers included:

- Michael Badnarik, candidate for U.S. House of Representatives (TX-10) and the 2004 Libertarian presidential candidate
- Judge John A. Buttrick, Maricopa County (Arizona) Superior Court Judge, 1994 Arizona gubernatorial candidate, 1998 Arizona House of Representatives candidate
- Megan Dickson, an eighth-grade honors student who spoke about libertarianism
- Patrick Dixon, city councilman, Lago Vista, Texas
- Bill Lynn, alderman, Davenport, Iowa
- Tonie Nathan, former Libertarian vice-presidential candidate, and the first woman to receive an electoral vote in U.S. history
- BetteRose Ryan, at-large LNC member
- Rev. Anthony Williams, candidate for U.S. House of Representatives (IL-2)
- Former Congressman Bob Barr, who has served as the chairman of Patriots to Restore Checks and Balances
- Andrew Neil, founding chairman of Sky TV, former publisher of The Scotsman, former editor of The Economist and former editor-in-chief of the Sunday Times
- Christopher J. Farrell, member of the Judicial Watch's board of directors
- Greg Nojeim, associate director and chief legislative counsel for the ACLU
- Krist Novoselic, founding member of the Seattle-based grunge rock band Nirvana, founder JAMPAC (Joint Artists and Music Promotions Political Action Committee), author of Of Grunge and Government: Let's Fix This Broken Democracy

=== 2008 ===
Sites of the 2008 national conventions

The 2008 convention was held at the Sheraton Denver Downtown Hotel (formerly the Adam's Mark Hotel) in Denver, Colorado (the same city as the very first convention in 1972), May 23–26.

=== 2010 ===
The 2010 convention was held in St. Louis, Missouri, from Friday, May 28, to Monday, May 31.

=== 2012 ===
Sites of the 2012 national conventions

The 2012 convention was held in Las Vegas, Nevada, May 4–6, 2012.

=== 2014 ===
The 2014 convention was held in Columbus, Ohio, during the last weekend in June.

=== 2016 ===
Sites of the 2016 national conventions

The 2016 convention was held in Orlando, Florida, during the last weekend in May.

=== 2018 ===
The 2018 convention was held from June 30 to July 3 in New Orleans, Louisiana. Nicholas Sarwark was reelected as chair, Alex Merced elected as vice chair, Caryn Ann Harlos elected as secretary, Tim Hagan reelected as treasurer, new at-large members were selected, and a new four-year term Judicial Committee was elected.

=== 2020 ===
The 2020 convention was scheduled to be held in Austin, Texas, over Memorial Day weekend, but that was canceled via the enactment of their impossibility clause. Nomination business for president and vice president and potentially, confirmation of the in-person convention, was to be done virtually on Friday, May 22, with ratification to take place sometime in early July. That alternate venue was set by the Libertarian National Committee for Orlando, Florida, the host city of the 2016 Libertarian National Convention.

=== 2022 ===
The 2022 convention was held on Memorial Day weekend from May 26 to 29 in Reno, Nevada.

=== 2024 ===
The 2024 convention was held from May 24 to the early morning of May 27, 2024, at the Washington Hilton in Washington, D.C.

=== 2026 ===
The 2026 convention was held from May 21 – 25, 2026, at the Amway Grand Plaza in Grand Rapids, Michigan.

== List of Libertarian conventions ==
The following is a list of United States Libertarian Party Presidential nominating conventions.

Libertarian conventions by year, with location and nominees
Year	Location	Presidential nominee	Vice presidential nominee
1972	Denver, Colorado	John Hospers of California	Theodora Nathan of Oregon
1973	Strongsville, Ohio	—N/a	
1974	Irving, Texas		
1975	New York, New York	Roger MacBride of Virginia	David Bergland of California
1977	San Francisco, California	—N/a	
1979	Los Angeles, California	Ed Clark of California	David Koch of Kansas
1980	Los Angeles, California	Ed Clark of California	David Koch of Kansas
1981	Denver, Colorado	—N/a	
1983	New York, New York	David Bergland of California	James Lewis of Connecticut
1985	Phoenix, Arizona	—N/a	
1987	Seattle, Washington	Ron Paul of Texas	Andre Marrou of Alaska
1989	Philadelphia, Pennsylvania	—N/a	
1991	Chicago, Illinois	Andre Marrou of Alaska	Nancy Lord of Nevada
1993	Salt Lake City, Utah	—N/a	
1996	Washington, D.C.	Harry Browne of Tennessee	Jo Jorgensen of South Carolina
1998	Washington, D.C.	—N/a	
2000	Anaheim, California	Harry Browne of Tennessee	Art Olivier of California
2002	Indianapolis, Indiana	—N/a	
2004	Atlanta, Georgia	Michael Badnarik of Texas	Richard Campagna of Iowa
2006	Portland, Oregon	—N/a	
2008	Denver, Colorado	Bob Barr of Georgia	Wayne Allyn Root of Nevada
2010	St. Louis, Missouri	—N/a	
2012	Las Vegas Valley	Gary Johnson of New Mexico	Jim Gray of California
2014	Columbus, Ohio	—N/a	
2016	Orlando, Florida	Gary Johnson of New Mexico	Bill Weld of Massachusetts
2018	New Orleans, Louisiana	—N/a	
2020	Virtual/Orlando, Florida	Jo Jorgensen of South Carolina	Spike Cohen of South Carolina
2022	Reno, Nevada	—N/a	
2024	Washington, D.C.	Chase Oliver of Georgia	Mike ter Maat of Virginia
2026	Grand Rapids, Michigan	—N/a	
