= 1996 Republican National Convention =

U.S. political event held in San Diego, California

- 1996 presidential election

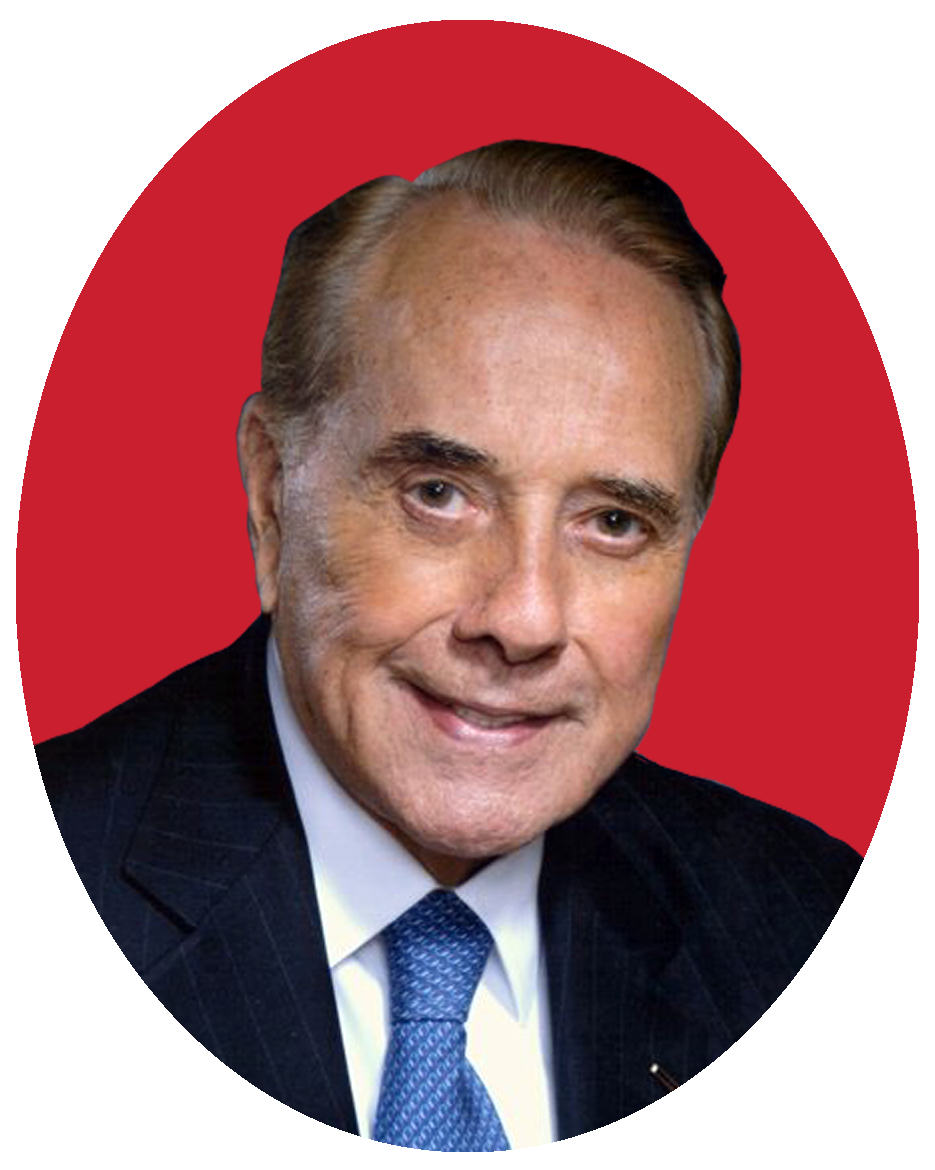
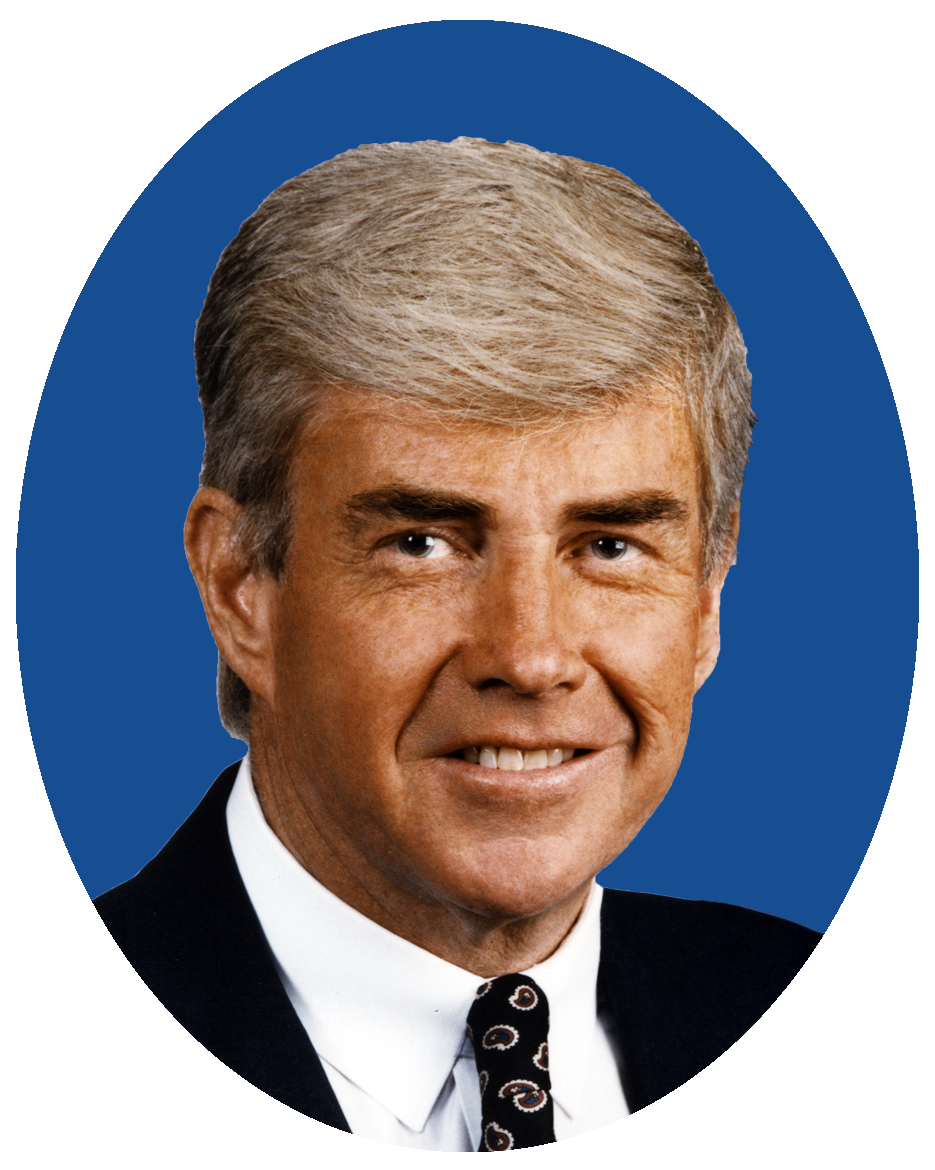
- Nominees; Dole and Kemp

Convention
- Dates: August 12–15, 1996
- City: San Diego, California
- Venue: San Diego Convention Center
- Keynote speaker: Susan Molinari
- Notable speakers: Bob Dole; Jack Kemp; Elizabeth Dole; George H. W. Bush; Gerald Ford; Colin Powell; Nancy Reagan; George W. Bush; John McCain; George Pataki; Newt Gingrich; Jerry Falwell

Candidates
- Presidential nominee: Bob Dole of Kansas
- Vice-presidential nominee: Jack Kemp of Maryland

Voting
- Total delegates: 1,990
- Votes needed for nomination: 996
- Results (president): Dole (KS): 1,928 (96.88%); Buchanan (VA): 43 (2.16%); Gramm (TX): 2 (0.10%); Keyes (MD): 1 (0.05%); Bork (VA): 1 (0.05%); Abstentions: 15 (0.75%)
- Results (vice president): Kemp (NY): 100% (by acclamation)
- Ballots: 1

The 1996 Republican National Convention convened at the San Diego Convention Center in San Diego, California, from August 12 to August 15, 1996. The convention nominated Senator Bob Dole from Kansas, for president and former representative and secretary of Housing and Urban Development Jack Kemp, from Maryland, for vice president.

== Background ==
=== Political context ===
After a bitter primary, Dole had secured the Republican presidential nomination—but at high cost, financially and politically. The Party had lost momentum after President Bill Clinton successfully co-opted the historically Republican issues of crime and welfare reform and portrayed Speaker Newt Gingrich as an extremist.

Within his own party, Dole was under pressure from both sides of the political spectrum. Social liberals such as California governor Pete Wilson and Massachusetts governor Bill Weld loudly argued to remove the Human Life Amendment plank from the convention platform. On the right, primary opponents Pat Buchanan and Alan Keyes withheld endorsements—Buchanan staged a rally for his supporters in nearby Escondido on the eve of the San Diego convention. Indeed, past comments by Kemp labeling Dole as a tax-raiser surfaced. The long, bitter primary had also left the Dole campaign short of funds as a result of federal election spending limits in the months leading up to the convention.

The Dole campaign sought to use the convention to unite the party, to appeal to political moderates, and to highlight Dole's honorable service in World War II and in the U.S. Senate. Nearly all floor speeches were delivered by moderate or liberal Republicans, including the keynote address by New York Representative Susan Molinari, and Dole was nominated by fellow veteran and Arizona Senator John McCain. Gingrich, who less than two years earlier had been a star of the party, was denied a prime time slot altogether, as was Buchanan, who had finished in second place for the nomination, with over 200 delegates. However, supporters in the socially conservative grassroots organizations such as the Christian Coalition directed the convention to adopt a conservative platform with little controversy, and Buchanan released his delegates at the last minute.

The convention ran smoothly overall, and the Dole-Kemp team seemed to benefit in the short term. Opinion polls taken shortly after the conclusion of the convention showed the Republicans with a significant "bump" of increased support. However, this bump was extremely temporary, and they continued to trail the incumbent Clinton-Gore team; they went on to lose the election by almost nine points.

=== Site selection ===
The Republican National Committee asked 30 cities to submit bids. Their finalist cities were Chicago, New Orleans, New York City, San Antonio, and San Diego. Chicago withdrew after winning their bid to host the 1996 Democratic National Convention. San Diego, ultimately, beat out the remaining finalists to win the RNC. The selection of San Diego was announced in January 1995.

The 1996 RNC was the first presidential nominating convention to be held in San Diego, and the only Republican National Convention held in Southern California (the 1972 RNC was scheduled for the San Diego Sports Arena but relocated to Miami Beach, Florida, due to scandal). Indeed, San Diego's bid had been considered unlikely to win. The San Diego Convention Center was far smaller than its predecessor venues, the Astrodome in Houston and the Louisiana Superdome in New Orleans, and its normal seating layout left several sections and skyboxes with obstructed views. Ardent lobbying by Mayor Susan Golding, who some named as a potential candidate for U.S. Senate in 1998, and by Governor Wilson, himself to seek the 1996 presidential nomination, helped secure San Diego's selection in 1994.

==== Bids ====
Finalist cities
City	Venue		Proposed financing for convention	Previous major party conventions hosted by city
City	Name	Capacity	Proposed financing for convention	Previous major party conventions hosted by city
Chicago, Illinois (withdrew bid)	United Center			Democratic: 1864, 1884, 1892, 1896, 1932, 1940, 1944, 1952, 1956, 1968; Republican: 1860, 1868, 1880, 1884, 1888, 1904, 1908, 1912, 1916, 1920, 1932, 1944, 1952, 1960
New Orleans, Louisiana	Louisiana Superdome	40,000	$14.6 million	Republican: 1988
New York City, New York	Madison Square Garden	20,924	$30.5 million	Democratic: 1868, 1924, 1976, 1980, 1992
San Antonio, Texas	Alamodome	43,311	$17.3 million	—N/a
San Diego, California	San Diego Convention Center	18,000	$14 million	—N/a

Other bids

In mid-February 1994, Los Angeles, California, withdrew its bid to have the Los Angeles Convention Center host the convention, citing the previous month's 1994 Northridge earthquake as the reason the city could not afford to finance the hosting of such an event in 1996.

In late-March 1994, St. Louis, Missouri, withdrew its bid.

=== Logistics ===
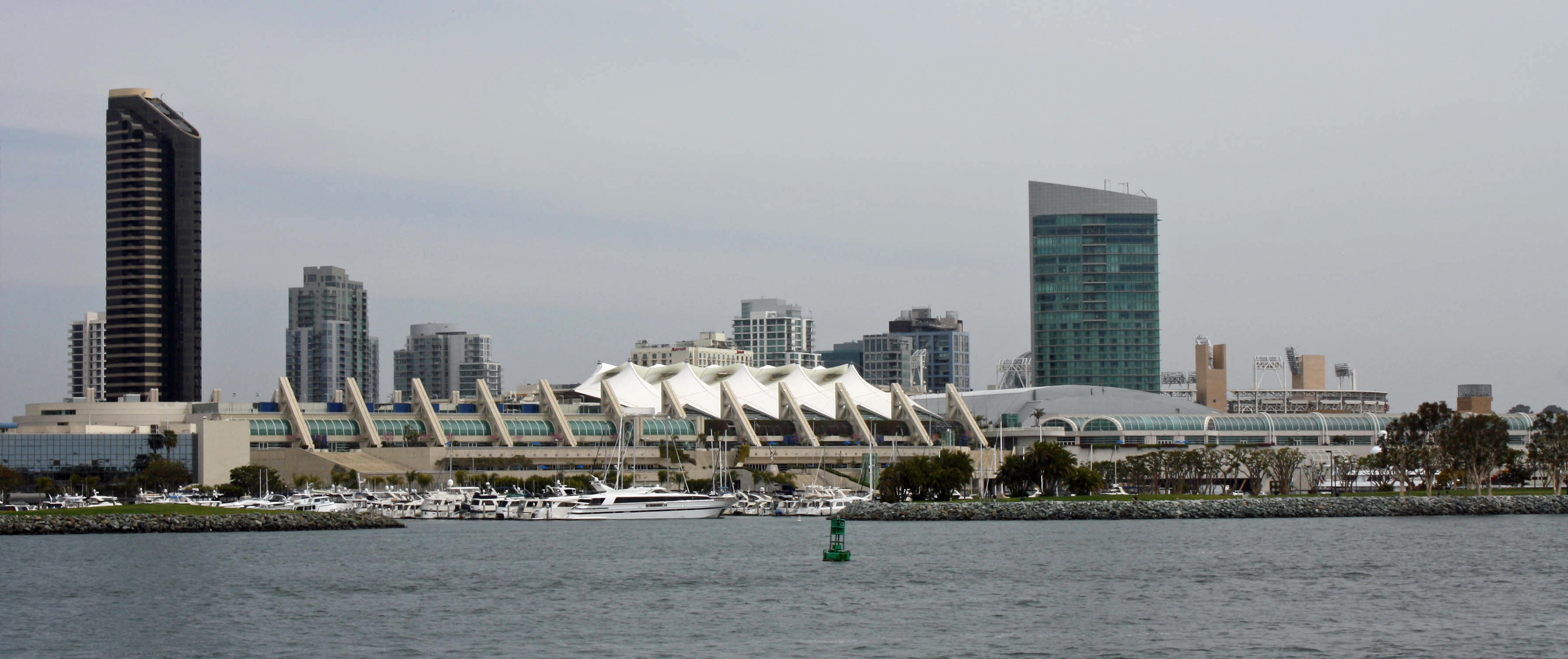
The San Diego Convention Center was the site of the 1996 Republican National Convention

The San Diego Host Committee, "Sail to Victory '96," was organized on September 8, 1995.

This was the first national party convention since the 1995 Oklahoma City bombing, which sparked heightened concerns over terrorism. The possibility that the explosion of TWA Flight 800 weeks before was a terrorist incident also weighed on convention planners. The Convention Center was located on the waterfront, near a harbor frequented by thousands of small boats—upon one of which Dole and Kemp made their ceremonial arrival. The police, Coast Guard, and other security presence was massive.

Convention planners situated the designated protest area several blocks away from the convention center, sparking criticism and legal action. It was later moved to a parking lot closer to the building which had originally been designated as an ADA-compliant transportation hub.

The convention was successful for San Diego, bringing positive publicity to the city and its revitalized waterfront and Gaslamp Quarter. The convention committee, however, overran its budget by some $20 million, largely because of the extra costs of security.

Due to the limited 27 foot (10 m) ceiling height of the convention hall, the podium was elevated a mere 6 feet (0 m) above the convention floor, significantly lower than the podium had been elevated at the preceding 1992 Republican convention. Due to the small space in the convention hall, thousands of credentialed convention-goers were relegated to watching the convention via television screens in secondary rooms in the convention complex.

Media outlets observed that the convention's prime time programming had deen choreographed as a "made-for-TV" event; The Washington Post described it as having a "tightly packaged, carefully scripted format" and a "fast-paced program, replete with cutaways, taped segments and slick videos, in an effort to maximize air time for their partisan message." Except for the acceptance and keynote speeches, speakers were generally allotted no more than five minutes to speak. To warn speakers when their allotted speaking time was running out, a light was mounted on the podium. The convention even built its schedule to anticipate and accommodate commercial breaks on the networks broadcasting the convention live. RNC chairman Haley Barbour explained that the convention would be "fast-paced and entertaining" to preserve viewer interest, arguing that the video packages allowed them to deliver their message "more succinctly, more clearly and more efficiently" not unlike a newscast.

To ensure that some television audiences would see uncut extended coverage of the convention with a strictly pro-Republican slant, the Republican National Committee purchased television time on The Family Channel to air its "GOP-TV" coverage commercial free from 9am to 11pm for the duration of the convention. The Family Channel was owned by Pat Robertson, who was prominently involved in Republican politics. The Republican Party also purchased a half hour of morning broadcast time on USA Network on five days during the convention week. Television pundits expressed their displeasure with how choreographed and non-spontaneous the convention proceedings were, and television viewership of the convention were lower than any previous nationally television conventions. Republican advisor Bill Kristol criticized the RNC for "[thinking like] a sitcom producer", arguing that "there's not even a pretense that there's going to be any articulation of ideas and issues."

One of the chief Dole operatives tasked with overseeing convention preparations was Paul Manafort.

The cost associated with setting up the convention hall itself were reported to be between $5 million and $7 million.

The federal government provided both conventions with $12.3 million in funding in 1996. Johnson & Higgins provided liability insurance coverage for the convention.

== Party platform ==
Despite speeches at the convention having a more moderate and inclusive tone, the party platform adopted at the 1996 convention catered the conservative ideological right.

== Convention speakers ==
John Marelius of the San Diego Union-Tribune described the convention's lineup of speakers as portraying a, "diverse, inclusive Republican Party of stirring orators, women, minorities, disabled people and Democrats who switched parties." Marelius regarded the convention as contrasting with the preceding 1992 Republican convention, which had given prominent platform for Pat Buchanan's "religious war". Some religious conservatives took issue with the sparse inclusion of "pro-life" (anti-abortion) rhetoric in the convention. Pat Buchanan was denied a speaking slot at the convention.

=== Schedule ===
==== Day one: Monday, August 12 ====
Speaker	Position/Notability
Gerald Ford	38th President of the United States (1974-1977)
George H. W. Bush	41st President of the United States (1989-1993)
Colin Powell	Former Chairman of the Joint Chiefs of Staff (1989-1993) Former U.S. National Security Advisor (1987-1989)
Nancy Reagan	Former First Lady of the United States (1981-1989)
Mary Fisher Hydeia Broadbent	HIV/AIDS activists

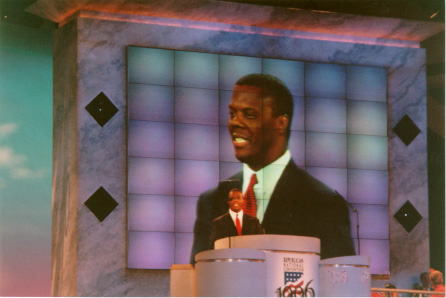
J. C. Watts speaking on August 13

==== Day two: Tuesday, August 13 ====
Speaker	Position/Notability
Susan Molinari	U.S. Congresswoman from NY-19 (1990-1997) Vice Chairwoman of the House Republican Conference (1995-1997) (keynote address)
George W. Bush	46th Governor of Texas (1995-2000) Son of George H. W. Bush (call to order)
John Kasich	U.S. Congressman from OH-12 (1983-2001)
J. C. Watts	U.S. Congressman from OK-04 (1995-2003)
Kay Bailey Hutchison	U.S. Senator from Texas (1993-2013)
Christine Todd Whitman	50th Governor of New Jersey (1994-2001)
Newt Gingrich	50th Speaker of the United States House of Representatives (1995-1999) Leader of the House Republican Conference (1995-1999) U.S. Congressman from GA-06 (1979-1999)
John G. Rowland	86th Governor of Connecticut (1995-2004)
John Engler	46th Governor of Michigan (1991-2003)
Tommy Thompson	42nd Governor of Wisconsin (1987-2001)
Tom Ridge	43rd Governor of Pennsylvania (1995-2001)
Jim Edgar	38th Governor of Illinois (1991-1999)
Bill Frist	U.S. Senator from Tennessee (1995-2007)

==== Day three: Wednesday, August 14 ====
Speaker	Position/Notability
Elizabeth Dole	20th U.S. Secretary of Labor (1989-1990) 8th U.S. Secretary of Transportation (1983-1987) speech by wife of presidential nominee
Robin Dole	Daughter of Bob Dole
Ben Nighthorse Campbell	U.S. Senator from Colorado (1993-2005)
Dan Quayle	44th Vice President of the United States (1989-1993)
Jeane Kirkpatrick	16th U.S. Ambassador to the United Nations (1981-1985)
Fred Thompson	U.S. Senator of Tennessee (1994-2003)
James A. Baker III	44th U.S. Secretary of State (1989-1992) 67th U.S. Secretary of the Treasury (1985-1988)
Pete Wilson	36th Governor of California (1991-1999)
Heather Whitestone McCallum	Former Miss America Winner
John McCain	U.S. Senator of Arizona (1987-2018) (Nomination of Bob Dole)
Henry Bonilla	U.S. Congressman of TX-23 (1993-2007)
Wendy Lee Gramm	Chairperson of the Commodity Futures Trading Commission (1988-1993)
Two further seconding speeches were delivered by two residents of Dole's hometown, Russell, Kansas
George Pataki	53rd Governor of New York (1995-2006) (Nomination of Jack Kemp)
Lynne Cheney	Wife of former Secretary of Defense Dick Cheney
Ken Blackwell	48th Secretary of State of Ohio (1999-2007)
William Bennett	3rd U.S. Secretary of Education (1985-1988)
Jerry Falwell	Reverend (1956-2007) (Benediction speech)

==== Day four: Thursday, August 15 ====
Speaker	Position/Notability
Stephen Fong	Committeeman from California
Jack Kemp	9th U.S. Secretary of Housing and Urban Development (1989-1993) Vice Presidential Nominee
Bob Dole	Former U.S. Senator from Kansas (1969-1996) Former Senate Majority Leader (1995-1996; 1987-1988) 1976 Vice presidential nominee Presidential Nominee

=== Notable speeches ===
==== Bob Dole's presidential nomination acceptance speech ====
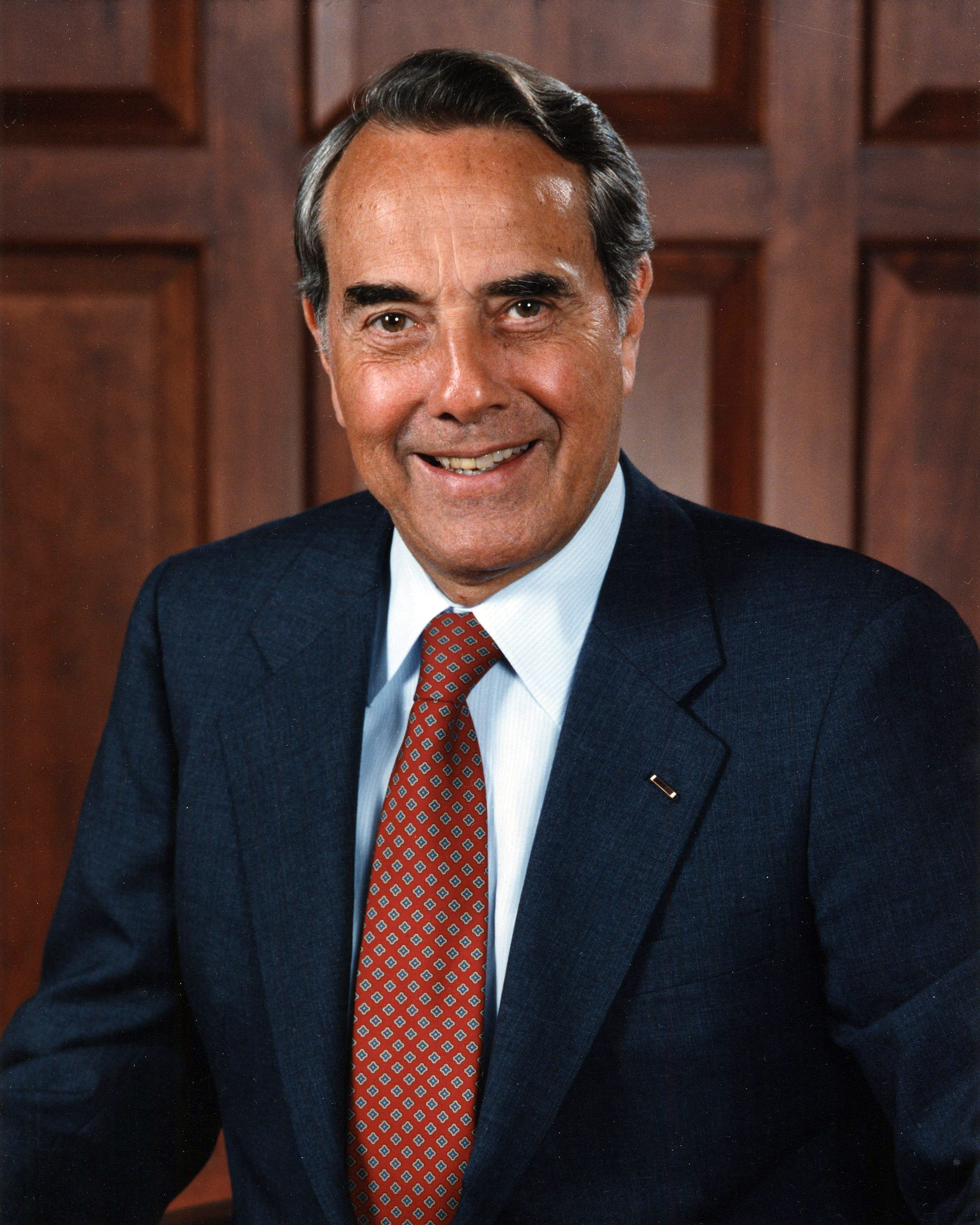

Tonight, I stand before you tested by adversity, made sensitive by hardship, a fighter by principle, and the most optimistic man in America. My life is proof that America is a land without limits. And with my feet on the ground and my heart filled with hope, I put my faith in you and in the God who loves us all. For I am convinced that America's best days are yet to come.

— Bob Dole at the 1996 Republican National Convention

Dole's acceptance speech provided a heavy focus on the issue of trust, highlighting not just the need for the American public to have trust in government, but also the need for the government to have trust in the American public. Dole declared, "the fundamental issue is not of policy, but of trust -- not merely whether the people trust the president, but whether the president and his party trust the people, trust in their goodness and their genius for recovery. For the government cannot direct the people, the people must direct the government."

In his speech, Dole denounced intolerance, including racism and religious intolerance. Dole declared the Republican to be, "broad and inclusive," claiming that it represented, "many streams of opinion and many points of view". Dole exclaimed, "if there’s anyone who has mistakenly attached themselves to our party in the belief that we are not open to citizens of every race and religion, then let me remind you — tonight this hall belongs to the party of Lincoln, and the exits, which are clearly marked, are for you to walk out of as I stand this ground without compromise."

In comments that were seen as partially alluding to his longevity of age; Dole who at the age of 74, was older than any previous United States president had been when elected to their first term, hailed himself as prospectively being, "the bridge to a time of tranquility, faith and confidence in action," exclaiming, "to those who say it was never so, that America had not been better, I say, you're wrong, and I know. Because I was there. I have seen it. I remember."

Dole touted the value of political compromise, proclaiming, "in politics, honorable compromise is no sin. It is what protects us from absolutism and intolerance."

Dole characterized his Democratic opponent, incumbent president Bill Clinton, as having failed to, "provide for our future defense" in regards to defense spending.

Dole issued negative characterizations of a varied array of groups and elements, including attacks on teachers unions, liberal judges, criminals, and government bureaucracies. Dole negatively characterized the book It Takes a Village (which was written by First Lady Hillary Clinton, the wife of Dole's Democratic opponent Bill Clinton) as calling for state collectivist childcare, which he argued ran counter to the concept of family responsibility.

Dole mentioned having talked on the phone that day with former president Ronald Reagan (who was absent from the convention due to his Alzheimers condition) and declared that he had promised that he would "win one more for the Gipper." (an allusion to Reagan's role in Knute Rockne, All American). This was the first RNC since 1960 in which Reagan was absent.

Dole's speech was written over a period of several months. However, days before he was scheduled to deliver it, four aides of Dole were brought in to overhaul the speech's conclusion.

The Houston Chronicle reviewed Dole's speech as making, " his strongest case yet," for why he should become president' The New York Times editorial board gave the speech a mixed review, describing it as illustrating, "both the strengths and the weaknesses" of Dole's candidacy. It took issue on Dole's criticism of Clinton's defense spending as insufficient, arguing that with his proposed 15% across-the-board tax cut, Dole was, "in no position to declare that he will spend more" on defense spending. John Marelius of the San Diego Union-Tribune characterized the speech as lacking either, "soaringly memorable language or a thematic spine." However, he also opined that, by highlighting the issue of mutual trust government and the public, Dole articulated, "a rationale for his candidacy that had so often been missing on the campaign trail." The Chicago Tribune's editorial board, in its endorsement of Dole, hailed Dole's "eloquent" remarks against religious and racial intolerance.

==== Jack Kemp's vice presidential nomination acceptance speech ====
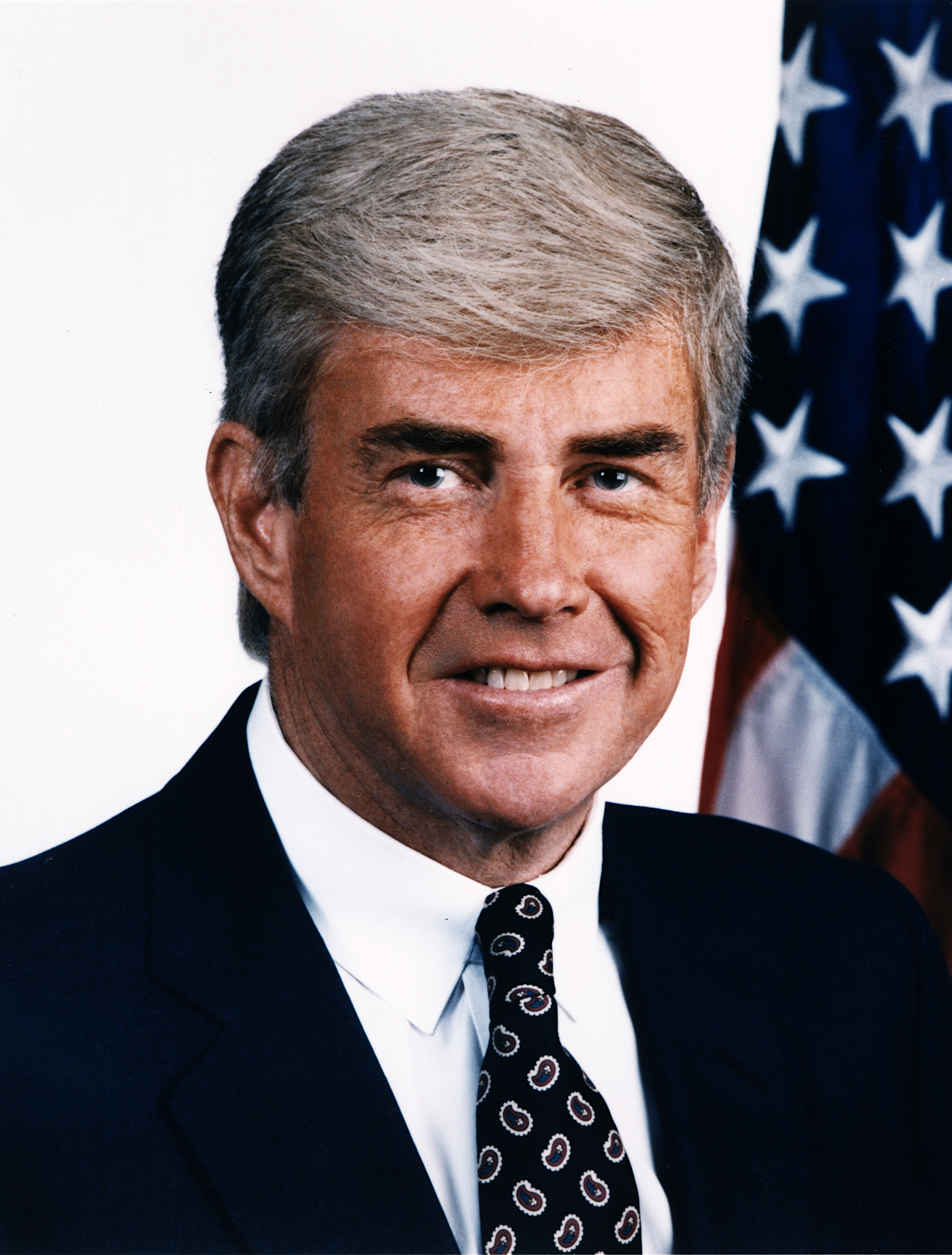

Bob and I are asking Americans to believe again in the promise of the American dream, to reach once more for the distant stars. We ask for your hands. We ask for your hearts and prayers. We want you to stand by us in this battle. And together, with God's help, we can achieve a better life for each and every American.

Dr. King said, "I don't know what the future holds, but I do know who holds the future." God bless you. God bless America.

— Jack Kemp at the 1996 Republican National Convention

Jack Kemp, the former Secretary of Housing and Urban Development under the George H. W. Bush administration, gave his acceptance speech of the 1996 Republican vice presidential nomination right before Bob Dole gave his acceptance speech for the Republican presidential nomination.

==== Elizabeth Dole ====
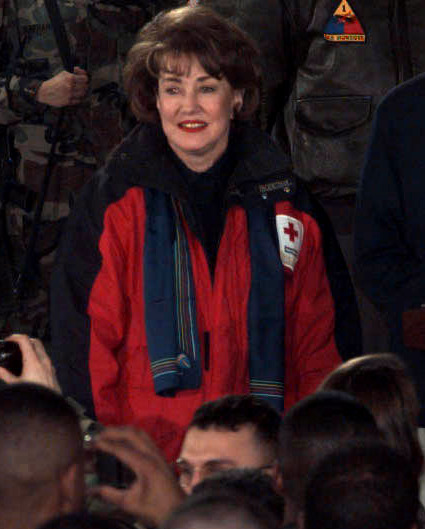

My fellow Americans I believe that in the years to come future generations will look back to this November, and say, "Here is where America earned a Badge of Honor. Here is where we elected a President who gave us more opportunity, a smaller and more efficient government, and stronger and safer families. Here is where we elected a better man who led us to a better America, because here is where we elected Bob Dole.

God Bless You All.

— Elizabeth Dole at the 1996 Republican National Convention

Presidential nominee Bob Dole's wife, Elizabeth, spoke at the convention. In tandem with his Democratic opponent Bill Clinton's wife, Hillary Clinton, later speaking at the Democratic convention, 1996 became the year in which it became established practice that both major party candidates spouses speak at their party's convention. The Baltimore Sun observed in 1996, "Although not unheard of, wives of nominees do not routinely address presidential conventions."

Dole opted to deliver her speech from the convention floor rather than from atop of the stage, even walking among some of the delegates during parts of her speech. This was an unusual staging for a convention speech that was likened to having optics resembling the format of an American daytime talk show. After she experienced technical difficulties with her lavalier microphone early into her speech, she was given a wireless handheld microphone. Her twenty-minute speech was much longer than any other speech delivered on that night of the convention. Her speech served to better humanize Bob Dole in the eyes of the American electorate. To further this, before her speech, Bob Dole's daughter Robin Dole had spoken for five minutes. Dole's speech recounted the life of her husband as well as her relationship with her husband.

==== Susan Molinari's keynote address ====
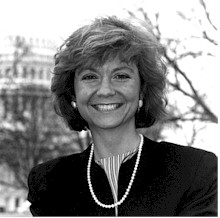

Tonight, I, too, want to talk to you about the American dream because it seems to be slipping out of reach for too many of us. And I want to tell America how Bob Dole and Jack Kemp and the Republican Party can make that dream easier to achieve again.

— Susan Molinari at the 1996 Republican National Convention

U.S. Representative and Vice Chair of the House Republican Conference Susan Molinari delivered the convention's keynote address.

Molinari's speech spoke of mothers like herself being, "stretched to the limit, trying to hold down a job while trying to hold down the fort at home, too," faulting Clinton for passing what she claimed was "the largest tax increase in history." Faulting Clinton, she claimed that, "now Americans pay almost 40 cents of every dollar they earn in taxes, the most ever. Every year Bill Clinton's been in office, taxes have been higher, and family incomes have been lower." She painted the Dole-Kemp ticket as offering an alternative to the scenario that she characterized.

Molinari assailed Clinton as failing to fulfill the campaign promises he had been elected on in 1992, prefacing her speech with the quip, "This speech is a lot like a Bill Clinton promise: It won't last long and it'll sound like a Republican talking," and later quipping that, "Americans know that Bill Clinton's promises have the life span of a Big Mac on Air Force One. While that tag line may be funny, what's not funny is what he is doing to the promise of America."

CNN described Molinari's speech, which frequently mentioned her 3-month-old daughter and the children of other individuals, as perhaps intending to help lessen the gender gap shown in polls of women voters favoring the Democratic ticket.

==== George H. W. Bush ====
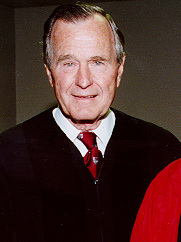

It breaks my heart when the White House is demeaned, the presidency itself diminished. Bob Dole, as president, will treat the White House with respect, his staff will be beyond even the appearance of impropriety and in the process he will increase respect for the United States of America all across the world.

— George H. W. Bush at the 1996 Republican National Convention

Former president George H. W. Bush, who been unseated in the previous 1992 election, delivered a speech on the convention's opening night.

==== Gerald Ford ====
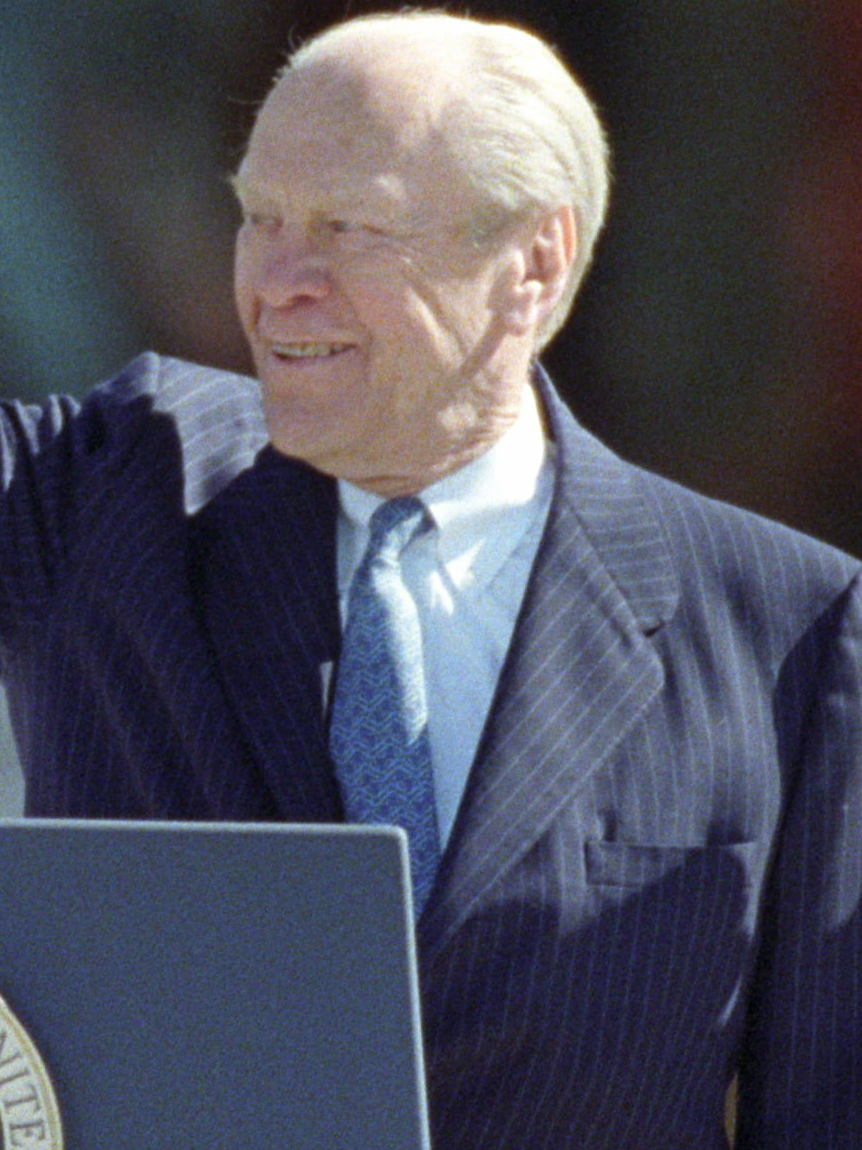

My friends, I know a thing or two about Bob Dole. And if there was anything I didn't know, I checked it out before choosing him as my running mate in 1976. I found Bob Dole fit to be President then; I find him even more qualified now.

Remember when you read today's national polls, Ford and Dole came from 30 points behind that August to win 49.9 percent of the actual ballots cast. We lost a cliff hanger. The only poll that accounts this year is still three months away.

— Gerald Ford at the 1996 Republican National Convention

Former president Gerald Ford, who had selected Dole as his vice presidential running mate in the 1976 United States presidential election, delivered a short speech on the convention's opening night.

Ford, in light of the Republican ticket trailing by double-digits in the polls at the time of the 1996 Republican National Convention, reminded voters that the 1976 Ford-Dole ticket gained 30 points in the polls before November 1976.

In his remarks, Ford made an automobile pun, quipping, "a few years ago, when I suddenly found myself President, I said I was a Ford, not a Lincoln. Today, what we have in the White House is neither a Ford or a Lincoln. What we have is a convertible Dodge. Isn't it time for a trade-in?".

==== Colin Powell ====
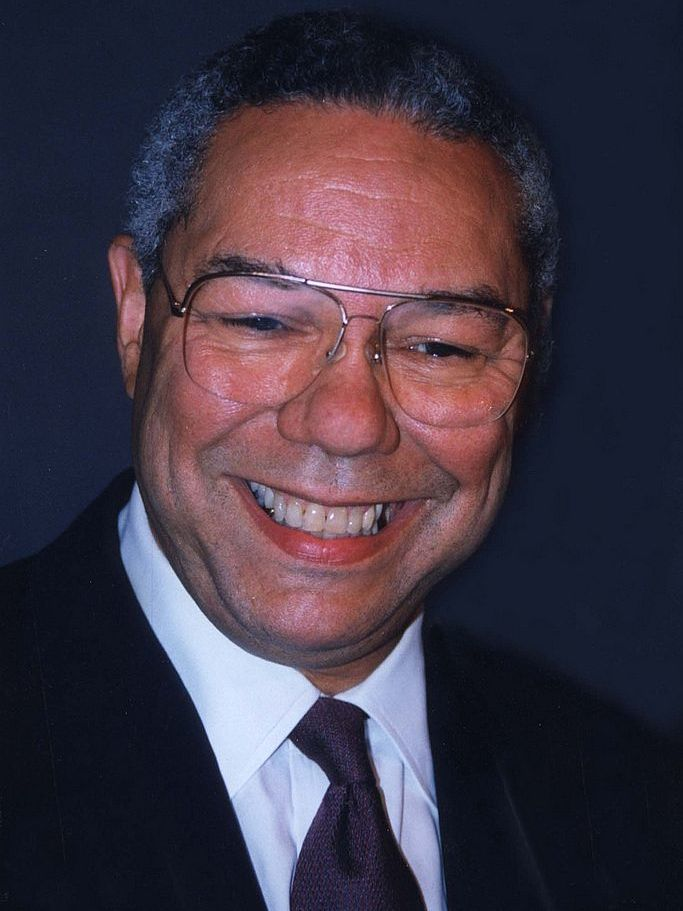

He is a man of strength, maturity and integrity. He is a man who can bring trust back to government and bring Americans together again. He is a fighter possessed of endless energy, drive and commitment. Bob Dole is a candidate most qualified by virtue of his beliefs, his character and competence to be the next President of the United States of America.

— Colin Powell at the 1996 Republican National Convention

Retired general Colin Powell delivered a speech on the convention's opening night. This was Powell's first major partisan political speech. Powell had only formally joined the Republican Party the previous year. Powell's speech was largely a call for compassion and inclusion, and touched on his upbringing by parents who were black immigrants from Jamaica. In endorsing Dole, Powell did not directly attack the Democratic ticket.

==== Nancy Reagan ====
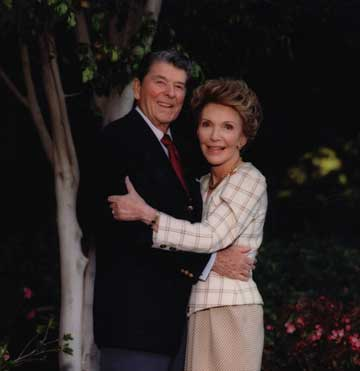

I want to thank you from the bottom of my heart for that beautiful film, and a special thanks for the people who were involved with putting it together and seeing it came on. It reminded me again of how grateful Ronnie and I are for the privilege that you and America gave us for the wonderful eight years in the White House.

— Nancy Reagan at the 1996 Republican National Convention

The wife of former president Ronald Reagan, Nancy Reagan, spoke at the convention, expressing gratitude.

==== Stephen Fong ====
On the closing night of the convention, Stephen Fong, then-president of the San Francisco chapter of the Log Cabin Republicans, spoke at the dais as part of a series of speeches from "mainstreet Americans," but was not publicly identified as gay. Fong was the first openly gay speaker at a Republican National Convention.

== Musical performances ==
Among the musical performances at the convention was an August 15 performance by the "Singing Senators" (Senators Trent Lott, John Ashcroft, Larry Craig, and Jim Jeffords) who sang a barbershop quartet version of the song Elvira in dedication to Elizabeth Dole.

== Presidential nomination roll call vote ==
Senator John McCain placed Bob Dole's name in nomination.

Republican National Convention presidential vote, 1996
Candidate	Votes	Percentage
Bob Dole	1,928	96.88%
Pat Buchanan	43	2.16%
Steve Forbes	2	0.10%
Alan Keyes	1	0.05%
Robert Bork	1	0.05%
Abstentions	15	0.75%
Totals	1,990	100.00%

== Vice presidential nominating vote ==
New York Governor George Pataki placed Jack Kemp's name into nomination, after which the former Secretary of Housing and Urban Development was nominated by voice vote.

== Impact ==
On August 16, the day after the close convention, John Marelius of the San Diego Union-Tribune characterized different polls as showing conflicting indicators as to whether Dole was rising or declining in the polls.

Ever since the 1996 election, in which both the Democratic and Republican conventions featured the spouses of the presidential nominees as speakers, it had become standard practice that both major parties feature the spouses of their presidential nominees as convention speakers. This convention stood uninterrupted until the 2024 Republican National Convention, at which Republican nominee Donald Trump's wife (Melania Trump) did not speak.

== See also ==
- 1996 Republican Party presidential primaries
- History of the United States Republican Party
- List of Republican National Conventions
- U.S. presidential nomination convention
- 1996 Democratic National Convention
- 1996 Libertarian National Convention
- 1996 United States presidential election
- Bob Dole 1996 presidential campaign

Preceded by 1992; Houston, Texas	Republican National Conventions	Succeeded by 2000; Philadelphia, Pennsylvania
