= 1991 Libertarian National Convention =

United States political event

- 1992 presidential election
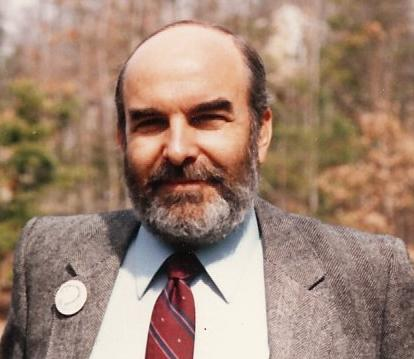
- Nominees; Marrou and Lord

Convention
- Dates: August 29–31, 1991
- City: Chicago, Illinois
- Venue: Chicago Marriott Downtown

Candidates
- Presidential nominee: Andre Marrou of Alaska
- Vice-presidential nominee: Nancy Lord of Nevada
- Other candidates: Richard Boddie of California

The 1991 Libertarian National Convention was held in Chicago, Illinois from August 29 to August 31, 1991. Andre Marrou of Alaska was chosen as the Libertarian Party's nominee for president in the 1992 election.

This was the first Libertarian National Convention to receive national television coverage, with C-SPAN broadcasting the convention.

Libertarians hold a National Convention every two years to vote on party bylaws, platform and resolutions and elect national party officers and a judicial committee. Every four years it nominates presidential and vice presidential candidates.

== Voting for presidential nomination ==
=== Candidates ===
- Richard Boddie, college teacher and motivational speaker from California
- Andre Marrou, real estate broker from Nevada
- David Raaflaub
- Hans Schroeder

=== First ballot ===
Andre Marrou was elected on the first ballot, gathering a majority of the voting delegates, securing nomination.

1991 Libertarian Party National Convention total vote count: Round 1
Candidate	Total votes cast	Percent of votes cast
Andre Marrou	257	53.3%
Richard Boddie	187	38.8%
None of the Above	20	4.2%
Hans Schroeder	7	1.5%
David Raaflaub	6	1.2%
Others (scattered)	5	1.0%
	Color key: / 1st place / 2nd place / 3rd place / 4th place / 5th place / 6th place	

== Voting for vice presidential nomination ==
A separate vote was held for the vice presidential nomination. Nancy Lord was nominated on the third ballot.

=== First ballot ===
1991 Libertarian Party National Convention total vote count: Round 1
Candidate	Total votes cast	Percent of votes cast
Richard Boddie	179	40.6%
Mary Ruwart	129	29.3%
Nancy Lord	98	22.2%
Calvin Warburton	19	4.3%
Craig Franklin	10	2.3%
Others (scattered)	6	1.4%
	Color key: / 1st place / 2nd place / 3rd place / 4th place / 5th place / 6th place	

=== Second ballot ===
After the second ballot, Ruwart dropped out of the race.

1991 Libertarian Party National Convention total vote count: Round 2
Candidate	Total votes cast	Percent of votes cast
Nancy Lord	179	42.6%
Richard Boddie	161	38.3%
Mary Ruwart	64	15.2%
Others (scattered)	16	3.8%
	Color key: / 1st place / 2nd place / 3rd place / 4th place	

=== Third ballot ===
Nancy Lord defeated Richard Boddie on the third ballot, securing the Libertarian Party nomination for vice president.

1991 Libertarian Party National Convention total vote count: Round 3
Candidate	Total votes cast	Percent of votes cast
Nancy Lord	223	53.5%
Richard Boddie	185	44.4%
Others (scattered)	9	2.2%
	Color key: / 1st place / 2nd place / 3rd place	

== See also ==
- Libertarian National Convention
- Other parties' presidential nominating conventions of 1992:
  - Democratic
  - Republican
- Libertarian Party of Colorado
- U.S. presidential election, 1992
