= 1987 Libertarian National Convention =

United States political event

- 1988 presidential election
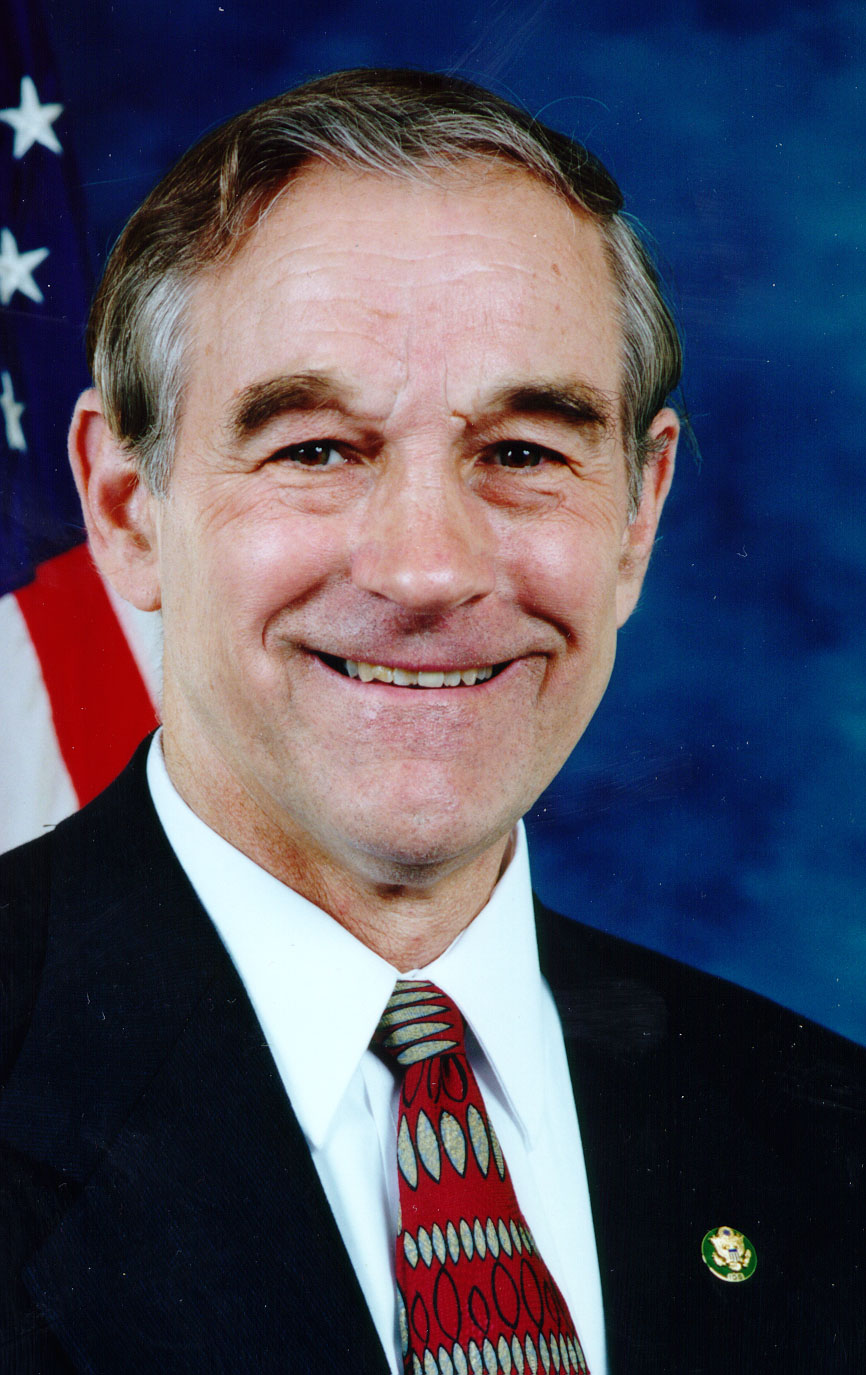
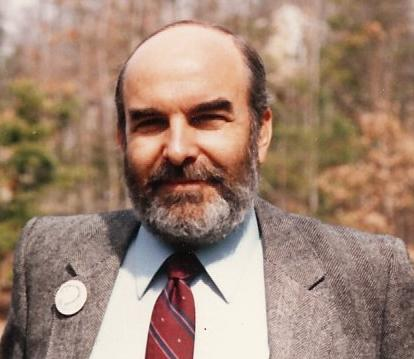
- Nominees; Paul and Marrou

Convention
- Date(s): September 4–6, 1987
- City: Seattle, Washington

Candidates
- Presidential nominee: Ron Paul of Texas
- Vice-presidential nominee: Andre Marrou of Alaska
- Other candidates: Russell Means of South Dakota

The 1987 Libertarian National Convention was held at the Sheraton Hotel in Seattle, Washington, from September 4 to September 6, 1987. Ron Paul of Texas was chosen as the Libertarian Party's nominee for president in the 1988 election.

Libertarians hold a National Convention every two years to vote on party bylaws, platform and resolutions and elect national party officers and a judicial committee. Every four years it nominates presidential and vice presidential candidates.

== Voting for presidential nomination ==
=== First ballot ===
Ron Paul was elected on the first ballot, gathering a majority of the voting delegates, securing nomination.

1987 Libertarian Party National Convention total vote count: Round 1
Candidate	Total votes cast	Percent of votes cast
Ron Paul	196	51.3%
Russell Means	120	31.4%
James A. Lewis	49	12.8%
None of the Above	14	3.7%
Harry Glenn	3	0.8%
	Color key: / 1st place / 2nd place / 3rd place / 4th place / 5th place	

== Voting for vice presidential nomination ==
A separate vote was held for the vice presidential nomination. Andre Marrou of Alaska was nominated without opposition.

== See also ==
- 1988 Democratic National Convention
- 1988 Republican National Convention
- 1988 United States presidential election
- U.S. presidential nomination convention
- Ron Paul presidential campaign, 1988
