= 1996 Libertarian National Convention =

United States political event

- 1996 presidential election
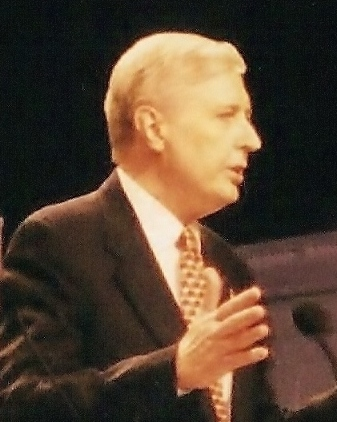
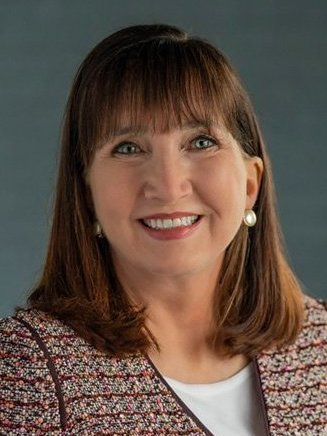
- Nominees; Browne and Jorgensen

Convention
- Dates: July 5–8, 1996
- City: Washington, DC

Candidates
- Presidential nominee: Harry Browne of Tennessee
- Vice-presidential nominee: Jo Jorgensen of South Carolina

The 1996 Libertarian National Convention was held in at the Hyatt Regency-Capitol Hill Hotel in Washington, DC, during the first weekend in July. Harry Browne was chosen as the party's nominee for president in the 1996 election.

"Declare your Independence" was the theme of the convention.

Libertarians hold a national convention, every two years to vote on party bylaws, platform and resolutions and elect national party officers and a judicial committee. Every four years it nominates presidential and vice presidential candidates.

== Background ==
=== Primaries ===
Some non-binding primary contests were held in some states:

Legend:	1st place (popular vote)	2nd place (popular vote)	3rd place (popular vote)	Candidate unable to appear on ballot

Date	Contest	Candidates and results					Total votes cast	Ref
Date	Contest	Harry Browne	RT Rick Tompkins	IS Irwin Schiff	DO Doug Ohmen	Other/Uncommitted	Total votes cast	Ref
February 20	New Hampshire	40.1% 653 votes	Unknown; Reported as "scatter"	20.7% 336 votes	Unknown; Reported as "scatter"	39.2% (Note: Includes: 10.8% write-ins for Pat Buchanan (176 votes); 6.3% write-ins for Forbes (103 votes); 22.1% for other write-ins (359 votes)); 638 votes	1,627 votes	
February 27	North Dakota	100% 145 votes	Not on ballot				145 votes	
February 27	South Dakota	63.1% 334 votes	Not on ballot	36.9% 195 votes	Not on ballot		529 votes	
March 5	Massachusetts	44.4% 386 votes	12.8% 111 votes	7.6% 66 votes	Unknown; Reported as "scatter"	35.3% (Note: Includes: 237 votes (27.2%) for Uncommitted; 70 votes (8%) reported as "scatter"); 307 votes	935 votes	
March 19	Illinois	73.9% 1,249 votes	Not on ballot	26.1% 441 votes	Not on ballot		1,690 votes	
March 26	California	49.8% 6,730 votes	23.6% 3,189 votes	15.3% 2,064 votes	10.5% 1,421 votes	0.9% (Note: 115 write-ins for Ralph Nader); 115 votes	13,519 votes	
May 14	Nebraska	100% 28 votes	Not on ballot				28 votes	
Totals votes earned		51.7% 9,525 votes	17.9% 3,300 votes	16.9% 3,102 votes	7.7% 1,421 votes	5.8% 1,060 votes	18,408 votes	
Convention ballot		69.1% 416 delegates	12.3% 74 delegates	5.3% 32 delegates	3.3% 20 delegates	10.0% 60 delegates	602 delegates	

== Logistics ==
The convention, featuring 700 delegates, was held in Washington, D.C.. It was broadcast by C-SPAN.

== Voting for presidential nomination ==
Harry Browne was nominated on the first ballot, gathering a majority of the voting delegates and defeating Rick Tompkins, Irwin Schiff and Doug Ohmen.

1996 Libertarian Party National Convention total vote count: Round 1
Candidate	Total votes cast	Percent of votes cast
Harry Browne	416	69.1%
Rick Tompkins	74	12.3%
None of the Above	60	10.0%
Irwin Schiff	32	5.3%
Doug Ohmen	20	3.3%
	Color key: / 1st place / 2nd place / 3rd place / 4th place / 5th place	

== Voting for vice presidential nomination ==
The convention voted to suspend the rules and allow a voice vote for the vice presidential nomination. After an initial voice vote led to a roll-call vote, Jo Jorgensen easily prevailed against no opposition, with 36 votes going to None of the Above.

=== Voice vote ===
1996 Libertarian vice presidential nomination
Candidate	Total votes cast	Percent of votes cast
Jo Jorgensen	459	92.7%
None of the Above	36	7.3%
	Color key: / 1st place / 2nd place	

== See also ==
- Libertarian National Convention
- Other parties' presidential nominating conventions of 1996:
  - Democratic
  - Republican
- Libertarian Party of Colorado
- U.S. presidential election, 1996
