= 1988 Democratic National Convention =

U.S. political event held in Atlanta, Georgia

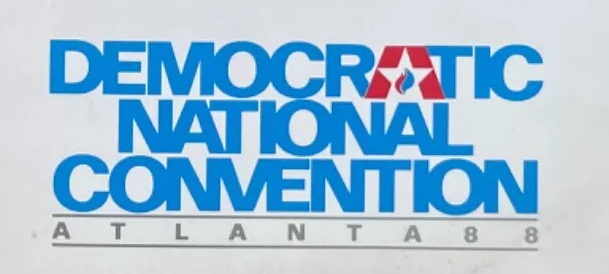
- 1988 presidential election

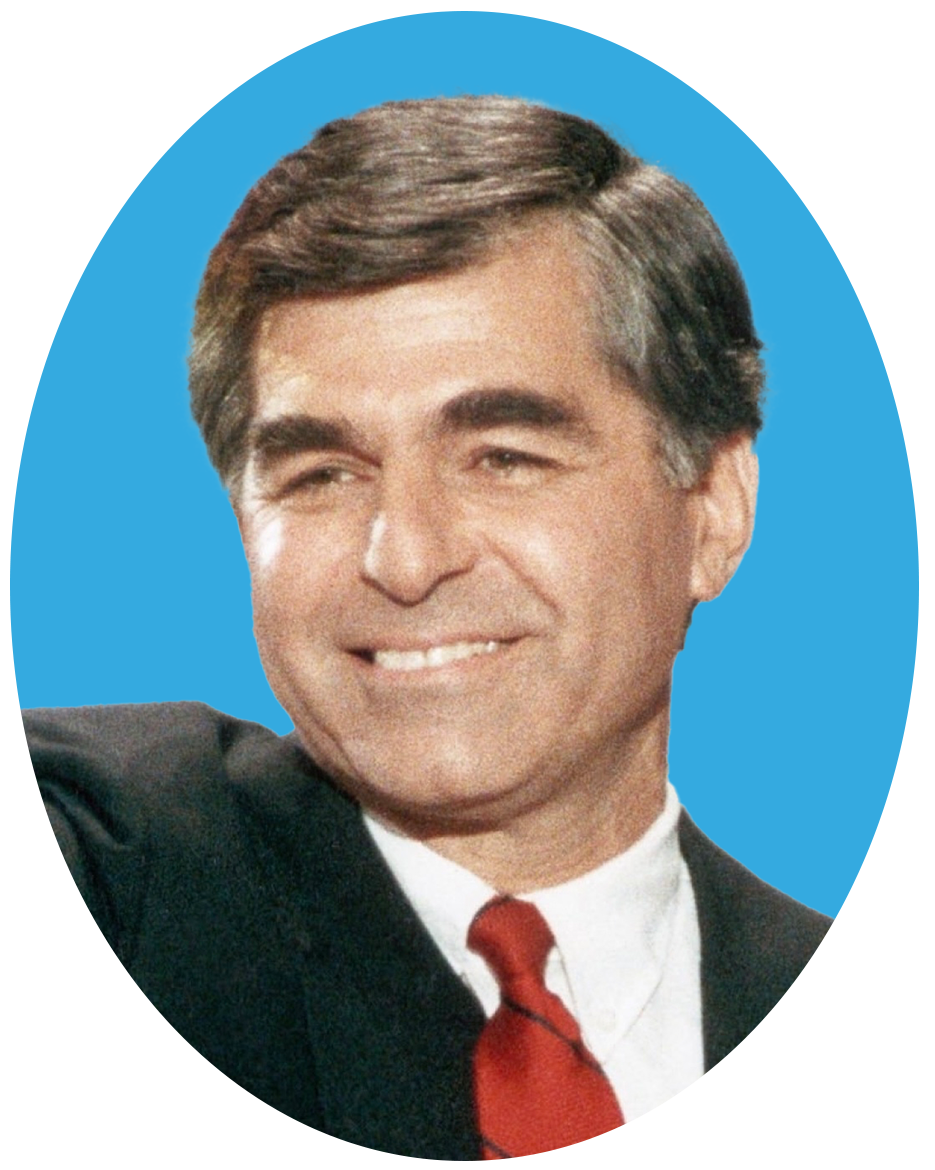
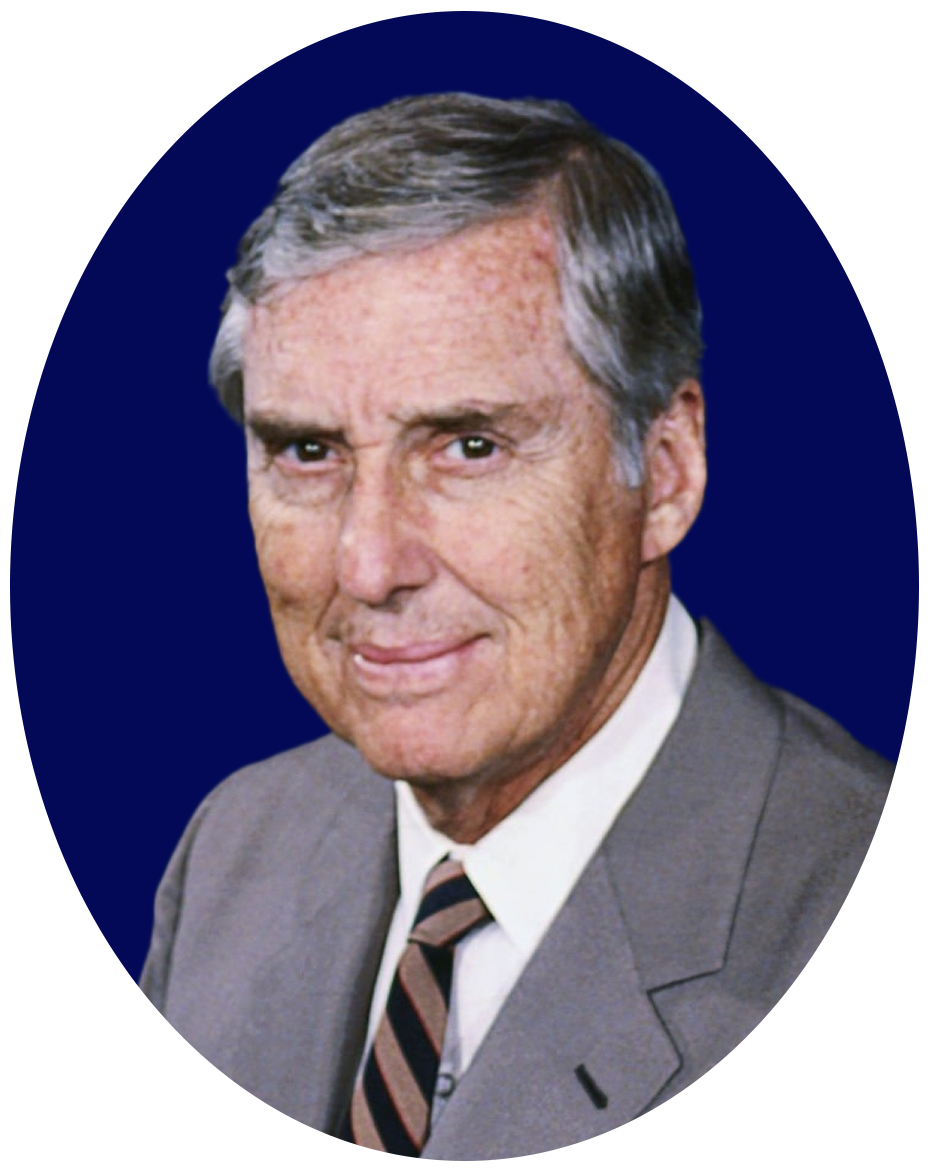
- Nominees; Dukakis and Bentsen

Convention
- Dates: July 18–21, 1988
- City: Atlanta, Georgia
- Venue: The Omni
- Keynote speaker: Ann Richards
- Notable speakers: Ted Kennedy; Bill Clinton; Jim Hightower; Jimmy Carter; Jesse Jackson

Candidates
- Presidential nominee: Michael Dukakis of Massachusetts
- Vice-presidential nominee: Lloyd Bentsen of Texas

Voting
- Total delegates: 4,105
- Votes needed for nomination: 2,054
- Results (president): Dukakis (MA): 2,877 (70.09%); Jackson (DC): 1,219 (29.70%); Stallings (ID): 3 (0.07%); Biden (DE): 2 (0.05%); Gephardt (MO): 2 (0.05%); Bentsen (TX): 1 (0.02%); Hart (CO): 1 (0.02%)
- Ballots: 1

The 1988 Democratic National Convention was held at The Omni in Atlanta, Georgia, from July 18 to 21, 1988, to select candidates for the 1988 presidential election. At the convention Governor Michael Dukakis of Massachusetts was nominated for president and Senator Lloyd Bentsen of Texas for vice president. The chair of the convention was Speaker of the U.S. House of Representatives Jim Wright.

== Speakers ==
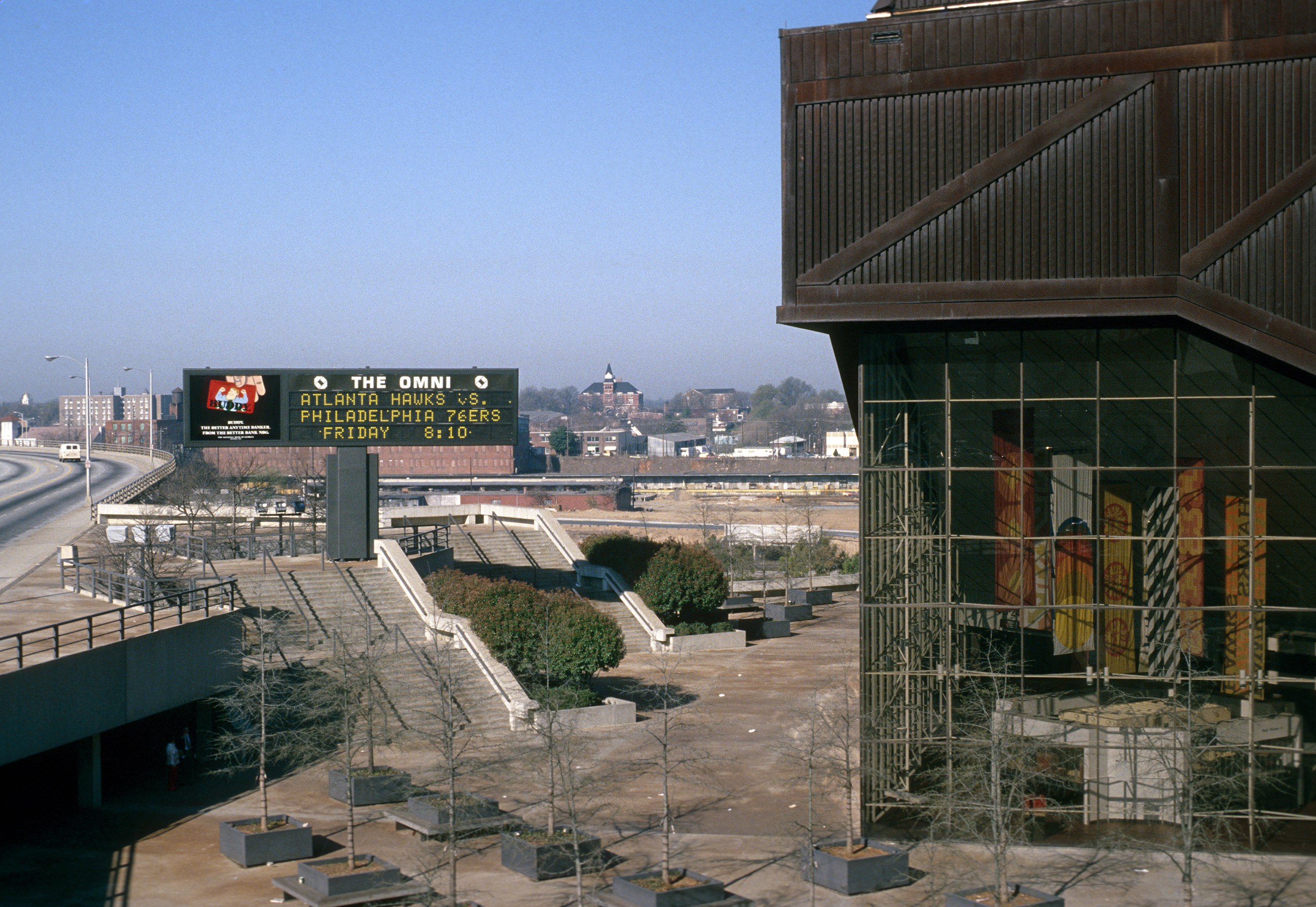
The Omni was the site of the 1988 Democratic National Convention

Speakers at the convention included Texas State Treasurer Ann Richards, who gave a keynote speech that put her in the public spotlight and included the line that George H. W. Bush was "born with a silver foot in his mouth". Arkansas governor Bill Clinton also gave a long and widely panned nomination speech on that same opening night that some predicted would ruin his political career, Massachusetts Senator Ted Kennedy's remarks contained the iteration "Where was George?", and Texas Agriculture Commissioner Jim Hightower called Bush "a toothache of a man."

On the following evening, having already quietly committed to support Gov. Dukakis. the Reverend Jesse Jackson, founder of the Rainbow/PUSH Coalition, brought then 75 year old Rosa Parks on stage and delivered the historic speech "Keep Hope Alive!"

== Production ==
The organizers for the convention chose pastel colors as a background in the belief that they would appear better on television. They were patterned after the colors of the American flag in salmon, azure, and eggshell. Republicans mocked the choice and used it to buttress their case that the Democrats were "soft" on the issues. New Jersey governor Thomas Kean claimed at the Republican Convention that "The Dukakis Democrats will try to talk tough, but don't be fooled. They may try to talk like Dirty Harry, but they will still act like Pee Wee Herman." Kean continued that Democrats and Republicans alike "have no use for pastel patriotism... The liberal Democrats are trying to hide more than the colors in our flag; they are trying to hide their true colors."

The theme song for the convention was composed and performed by longtime supporter and folksinger Carly Simon originally for the '84 DNC with different verses. Entitled "Turn of the Tide", the original version was accompanied by many of the famous folk singers, soft rockers and other light-adult-contemporary stars of the period. Originally available only on a limited run single-sided promotional 45 RPM record along with the matching program and other memorabilia, this version with the new verses for 1988 was released primarily as the B-side of the hit single "Let the River Run" from the 20th Century Fox motion picture Working Girl and was also used a few months later in the U.S./Russian co-production of Marlo Thomas' and Tatiana Vedeneyeva's Emmy Award-winning ABC television special Free to Be... a Family. Finally, the cut closed out the award-winning soundtrack album on A&M Records, Cassettes and CDs.

== Results ==
A number of candidates withdrew from the race at the start of the convention as the rules stated that delegates won by withdrawn candidates could be replaced. The final contest for the nomination was between Michael Dukakis and Jesse Jackson.

=== Presidential nomination ===
Democratic National Convention presidential vote, 1988
Candidate	Votes	Percentage
Michael Dukakis	2,877	70.09%
Jesse Jackson	1,219	29.70%
Richard Stallings	3	0.07%
Joe Biden	2	0.05%
Dick Gephardt	2	0.05%
Lloyd Bentsen	1	0.25%
Gary Hart	1	0.25%
Totals	4,162	100.00%

==== Vice presidential nomination ====
With Jackson's supporters demanding that he receive the vice-presidential nomination as his reward for coming in second, the Dukakis campaign decided to nominate Senator Bentsen by voice vote, rather than a roll call. This would become the tradition.

== Platform ==
=== Reproductive Rights ===
The platform added "the fundamental right of reproductive choice should be guaranteed regardless of ability to pay".

== See also ==
- 1987 Libertarian National Convention
- 1988 Republican National Convention
- 1988 United States presidential election
- History of the United States Democratic Party
- List of Democratic National Conventions
- United States presidential nominating convention
- 1988 Democratic Party presidential primaries
- Michael Dukakis 1988 presidential campaign

Preceded by 1984; San Francisco, California	Democratic National Conventions	Succeeded by 1992; New York, New York
