= 1992 Republican National Convention =

Political convention of the Republican Party

- 1992 presidential election

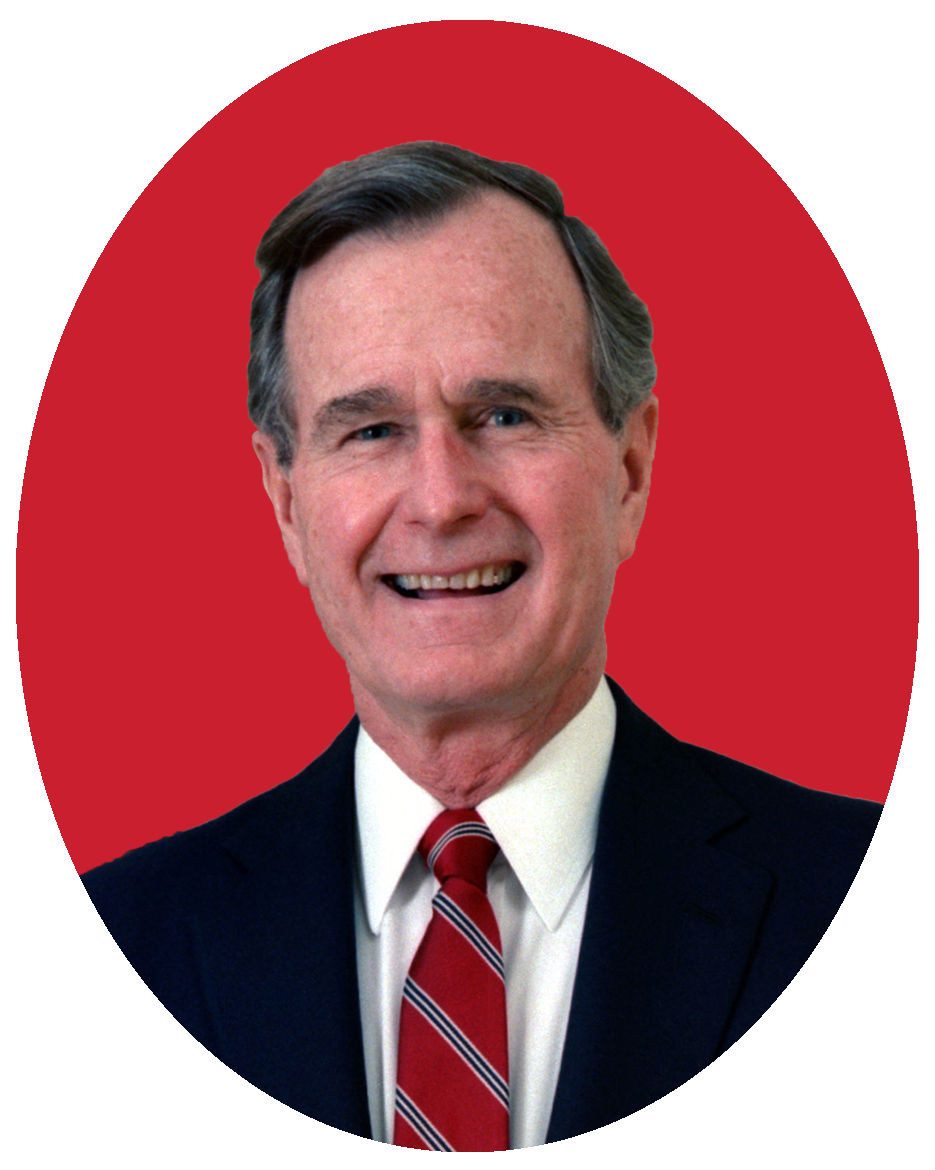
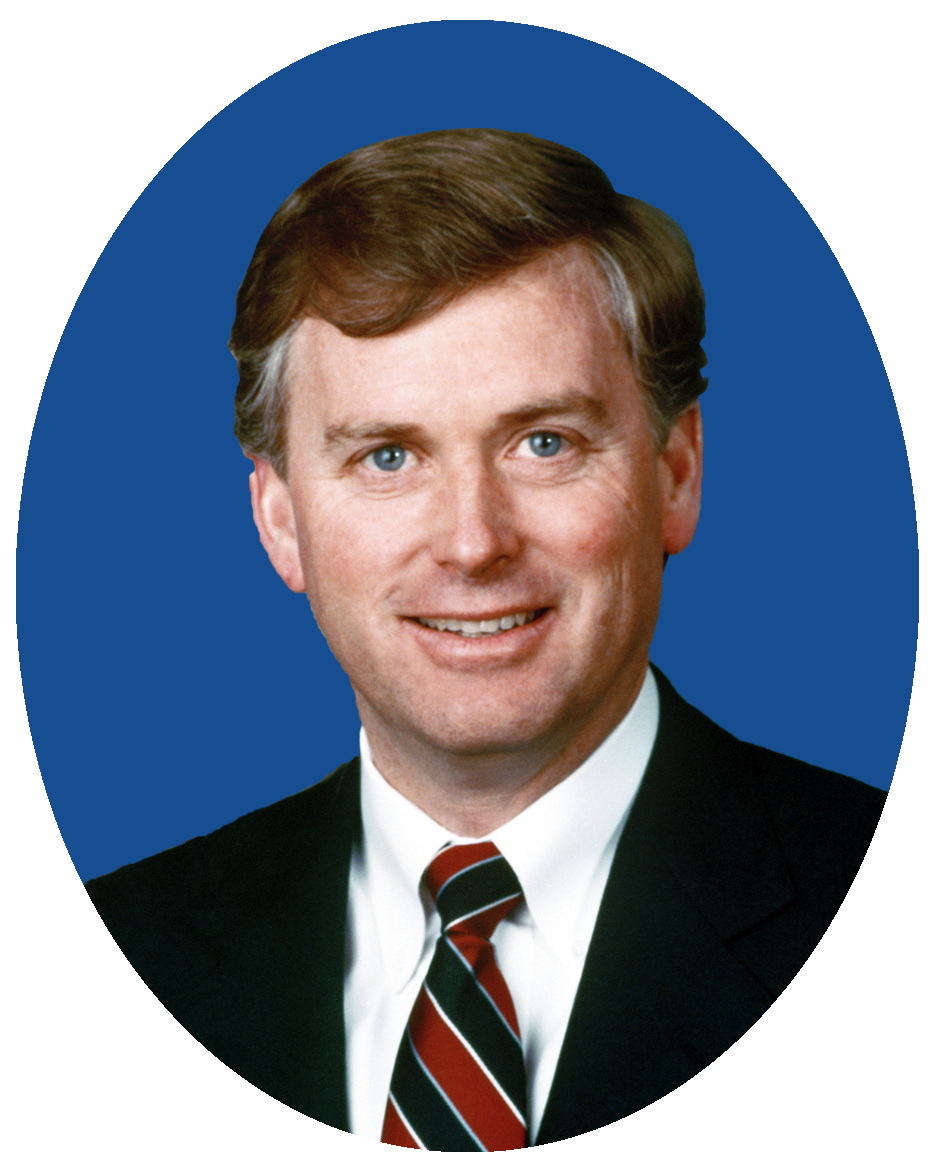
- Nominees; Bush and Quayle

Convention
- Dates: August 17–20, 1992
- City: Houston, Texas
- Venue: Astrodome
- Keynote speaker: Phil Gramm
- Notable speakers: George H.W. Bush; Dan Quayle; Barbara Bush; Marilyn Quayle; Pat Buchanan; Ronald Reagan; Gerald Ford; Bob Dole; Lynn M. Martin; Jack Kemp; Mitch McConnell; Pat Saiki; J.C. Watts; William Bennett

Candidates
- Presidential nominee: George H. W. Bush of Texas
- Vice-presidential nominee: Dan Quayle of Indiana

Voting
- Total delegates: 2,185
- Votes needed for nomination: 1,093
- Results (president): Bush (TX): 2,166 (99.13%); Buchanan (VA): 18 (0.82%); Keyes (MD): 1 (0.05%)
- Results (vice president): Quayle (IN): 100% (Acclamation)
- Ballots: 1

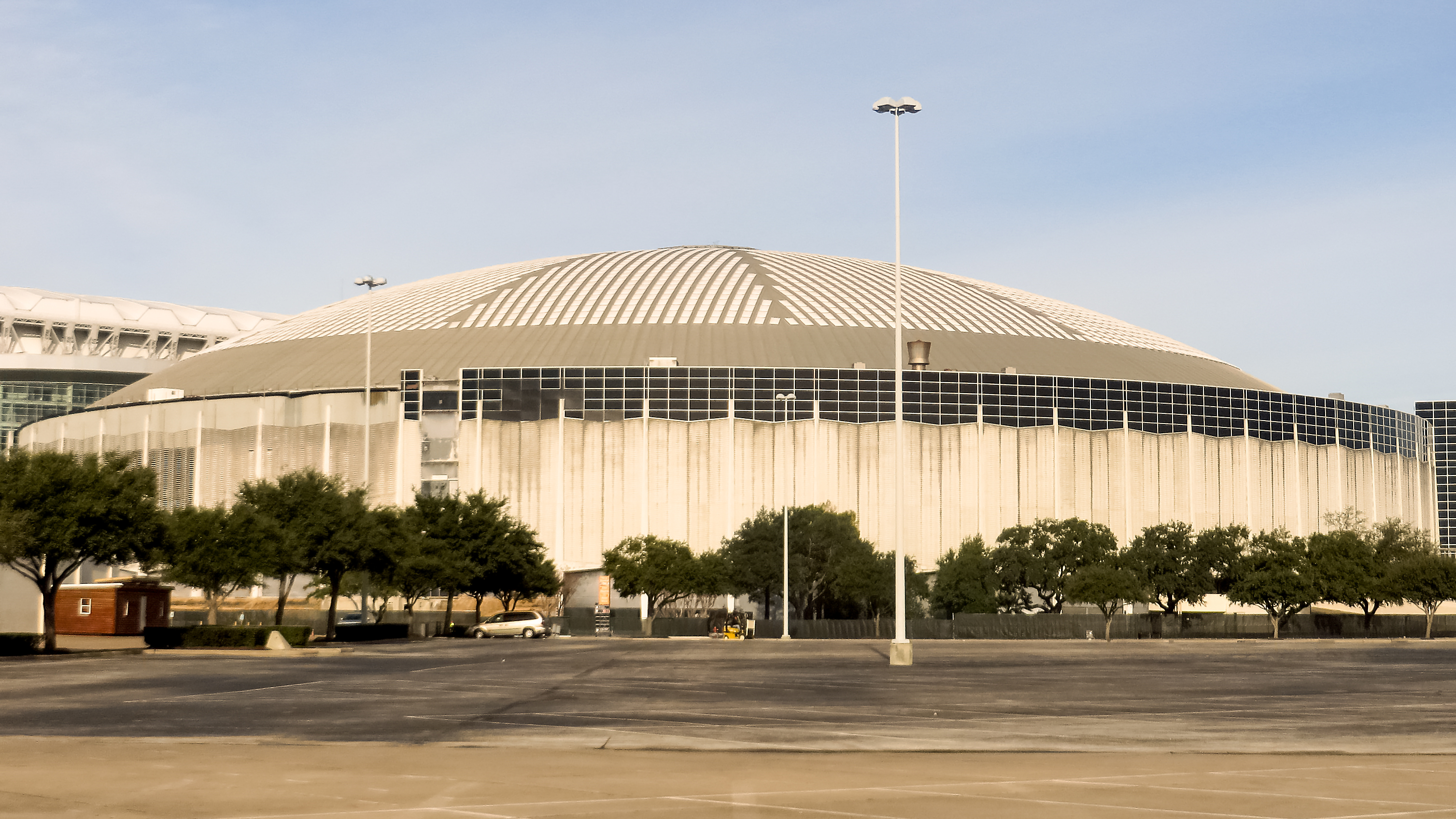
The Astrodome was the site of the 1992 Republican National Convention

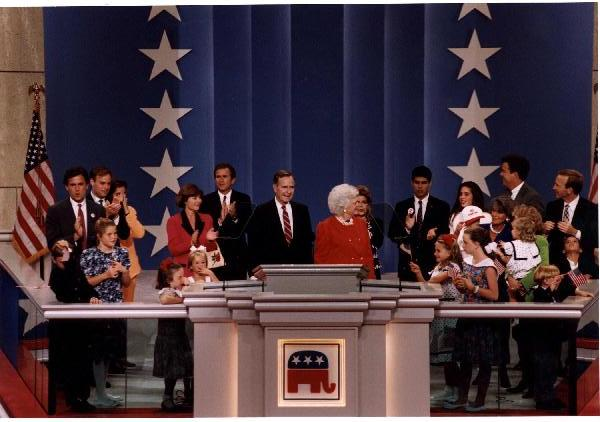
Bush with his family at the convention

The 1992 Republican National Convention was held in the Astrodome in Houston, Texas, from August 17 to August 20, 1992. The convention nominated President George H. W. Bush and Vice President Dan Quayle for reelection. It was Bush's fourth consecutive appearance as a candidate on a major party ticket; only Bush and Franklin D. Roosevelt have been nominated on four consecutive presidential tickets. Richard Nixon and Roosevelt were nominated five times, but not consecutively.

== Site selection ==
The two finalist cities that Houston had defeated to land the convention were New Orleans and San Diego. While Houston was the adopted hometown of the incumbent Republican president George H. W. Bush, when the location was announced, the party insisted that Bush had not used his influence to land the city the convention, and had only instructed the party to choose "the best site" for the convention. Unsuccessful finalist city New Orleans had been the location of the previous Republican National Convention in 1988.

=== Bids ===
Bid cities
City	Previous major party conventions hosted by city
Houston, Texas	Democratic: 1928
New Orleans, Louisiana	Republican: 1988
San Diego, California	—N/a

== Venue logistics ==
The Astrodome had been renovated recently before its selection as the convention's location. For the convention, the stadium was arranged to seat 36,000 people.

To accommodate the convention and its setup, the Houston Astros, the Major League Baseball team which played at the Astrodome, played 26 consecutive away games over 28 days, the longest Major League Baseball "road trip" since the Philadelphia Phillies played 27 away games in 28 days in 1944. Additionally, the National Football League's Houston Oilers would also be forced to play all their preseason games on the road. The Major League Baseball Players Association had filed an unsuccessful grievance in October 1991 in an attempt to block the planned 26-game road trip by the Astros. The Major League Baseball Players Association took issue with the Houston Sports Association (owners of the Astrodome) renting the stadium to the Republican National Convention organizers from July 27 through August 23, 1992, without first seeking permission from the National League, and their grievance sought to shorten the length of the road trip, arguing that the 26-game road trip went against the National League's constitution.

== Overview ==
The convention is notable in that it featured the last major address of the long political career of former President Ronald Reagan, Bush's predecessor. In his speech, Reagan told Americans that:

Whatever else history may say about me when I'm gone, I hope it will record that I appealed to your best hopes, not your worst fears, to your confidence rather than your doubts. My dream is that you will travel the road ahead with liberty's lamp guiding your steps and opportunity's arm steadying your way. My fondest hope for each one of you—and especially for the young people here—is that you will love your country, not for her power or wealth, but for her selflessness and her idealism. May each of you have the heart to conceive, the understanding to direct, and the hand to execute works that will make the world a little better for your having been here.

Ronald Reagan addresses the delegates (excerpt)

As the economy was in a recession and domestic affairs in general had dramatically decayed, the GOP lagged in the polls by double digits behind the Bill Clinton–Al Gore Democratic ticket after a successful Democratic Convention, and with Ross Perot temporarily out of the race, the Republican Party worked hard to rally its base of social conservatives. Pat Buchanan's opening night "culture war" speech argued that a great battle of values was taking place in the United States. Republican National Committee chairman Rich Bond (referring to Democrats) claimed that "we are America, they are not America." Marilyn Quayle dismissed Bill Clinton's claim to a new generation of leadership by saying, "Not everyone demonstrated, dropped out, took drugs, joined in the sexual revolution or dodged the draft." Regarding Buchanan's speech, liberal humorist Molly Ivins quipped that it "probably sounded better in the original German." Twenty years after the convention, the New York Times wrote, "Supporters of Mr. Bush pointed to the tone of the convention as one of the reasons he lost re-election that November to Bill Clinton," as it centered more on Reagan-era values and Bush's international credentials at a time that the main issue was the domestic crisis. Despite the fact that the now-infamous "No new taxes" pledge had haunted the President for the last three years, the economy was barely mentioned.

AIDS activist Mary Fisher, who has HIV, addressed the convention, making an eloquent plea for her cause. (She also addressed the 1996 RNC).

During his acceptance speech, President Bush thanked former President Richard Nixon (during whose tenure Bush had served as a U.S. Representative, Ambassador to the United Nations and Chairman of the Republican National Committee) for his advice and contributions to the administration's foreign policy. This would be the last RNC to take place during Nixon's lifetime, as he would die less than two years later.

Restaurateur Ninfa Laurenzo delivered the Pledge of Allegiance at the opening session on August 17, 1992.

Secretary of Labor Lynn Martin delivered the nomination speech of President Bush for re-election. The nomination was seconded by J. C. Watts.

The stadium banned outside food from the convention, but set up a food court in the nearby Astroarena. The food court operations included Atchafalaya River Cafe, Bambolino's, Frenchy's, Luther's Bar-B-Q, Ninfa's, PeaColes, and Tommy's Burgers. Some restaurant owners had connections with the Houston Host Committee, the group in charge of the vendor market of the Astroarena, and Republican Party officials. The hot dogs and soft drinks sold by the Astrodome's official caterer, Harry M. Stevens, were not present during the convention. Vendors at the convention paid Stevens a fee so they could sell food at the convention, as specified in Stevens' contract with the Astrodome.

1992 was the first Republican to which the territory of American Samoa had ever sent delegates, making this the first roll call in which American Samoa had cast votes for a Republican nominee.

== Presidential nomination roll call vote ==
The presidential roll call vote was held on the evening of August 19. The result was:

- George H. W. Bush 2,166
- Patrick J. Buchanan 18
- Alan Keyes 1

== Vice presidential nomination vote ==
Dan Quayle was renominated by voice vote on the final evening of the convention.

== Speakers and performers ==
=== August 17 morning session ===
Speakers

- Steve Bartlett, mayor of Dallas
- Bob Lanier, mayor of Houston
- Sally Atwater, widow of Lee Atwater

=== August 17 evening session ===
Speakers

- Phil Gramm, U.S. Senator from Texas
- Alan Simpson, U.S. Senator from Wyoming
- Jim Edgar, governor of Illinois
- Carroll Campbell, governor of South Carolina
- John McCain, U.S. Senator from Arizona
- Pat Buchanan, candidate in presidential primaries
- Paul Laxalt, former U.S. Senator and former governor Nevada
- Ronald Reagan, former president

Performers

- Tanya Tucker –"The Star Spangled Banner" and entertainment

=== August 18 morning session ===
Speakers

- Jeanie Austin, co-chairman of the Republican National Committee
- P. J. Morgan, mayor of Omaha
- Victor Ashe, mayor of Knoxville

=== August 18 evening session ===
Speakers

- Tommy Thompson, governor of Wisconsin
- Lamar Alexander, U.S. secretary of education
- Barbara Franklin, U.S. secretary of commerce
- William K. Reilly, administrator of the Environmental Protection Agency
- John Engler, governor of Michigan
- Louis W. Sullivan, secretary of health and human services
- James D. Watkins, U.S. secretary of energy
- William Weld, governor of Massachusetts
- Newt Gingrich, congressman from Georgia
- Jack Kemp, secretary of housing and urban development
- Phil Gramm, U.S. Senator from Texas –keynote speech

Performers

- Charlie Korsmo –Pledge of Allegiance
- Cara Stewart –"The Star Spangled Banner"

=== August 19th evening session ===
Speakers

- John Ashcroft, governor of Missouri
- Pat Robertson, televangelist and 1988 presidential candidate
- George Voinovich, governor of Ohio
- Pete Wilson, governor of California
- Marilyn Quayle, second lady of the United States –speech by spouse of VP nominee
- Barbara Bush, first lady of the United States –speech by spouse of presidential nominee
- Lynn M. Martin, secretary of labor –nominating speech for Bush
- Mitch McConnell, U.S. senator from Kentucky –seconding speech for Bush
- Pat Saiki, administrator of the Small Business Administration –seconding speech for Bush
- J. C. Watts, member of the Oklahoma Corporation Commission –seconding speech for Bush
- William Bennett, former U.S. secretary of education –seconding speech for Bush

Performers

- Lee Greenwood – Pledge of Allegiance
- Wynonna Judd –the "The Star Spangled Banner" and entertainment

=== August 20th evening session ===
- Gerald Ford, former president
- Dan Quayle, vice president -VP nomination acceptance speech
- Bob Dole, U.S. Senator from Kansas and U.S. Senate minority leader
- George H. W. Bush, president –presidential acceptance speech

== Aftermath ==
The convention energized the Republican base, giving the Bush-Quayle ticket a bounce in the polls. As the bounce faded, the race returned to a lopsided double-digit Clinton–Gore lead. The race narrowed considerably, however, when Ross Perot rebooted his insurgent campaign.

The major parties have avoided hosting their conventions at baseball stadiums since then, now holding them in non sports venues (such as convention centers) and venues for teams whose seasons are not currently in play at the time of the convention.

== See also ==
- 1992 Republican Party presidential primaries
- George H. W. Bush 1992 presidential campaign
- History of the United States Republican Party
- List of Republican National Conventions
- U.S. presidential nomination convention
- 1991 Libertarian National Convention
- 1992 Democratic National Convention
- 1992 United States presidential election

Preceded by 1988; New Orleans, Louisiana	Republican National Conventions	Succeeded by 1996; San Diego, California
