= 1988 Republican National Convention =

Political convention of the Republican Party

- 1988 presidential election

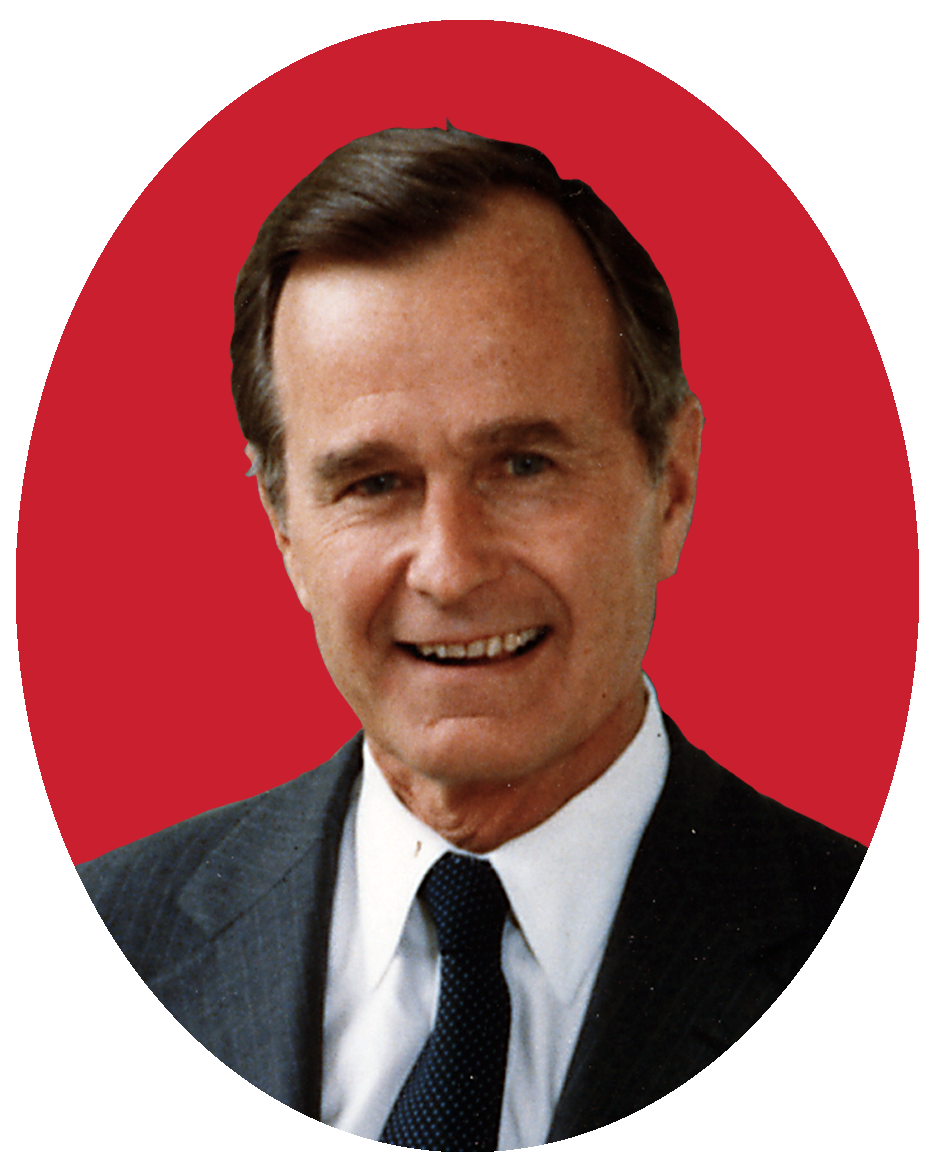
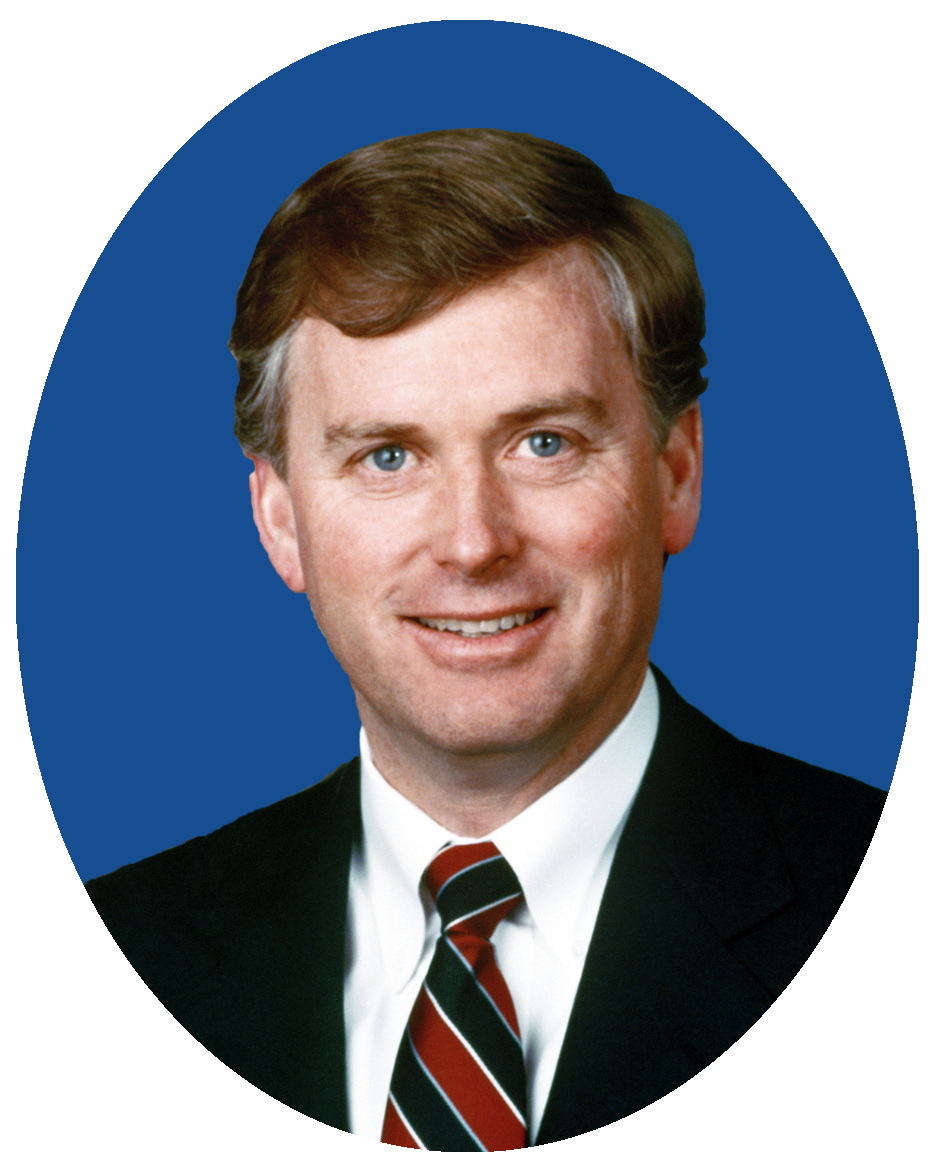
- Nominees; Bush and Quayle

Convention
- Date(s): August 15–18, 1988
- City: New Orleans, Louisiana
- Venue: Louisiana Superdome
- Keynote speaker: Thomas Kean

Candidates
- Presidential nominee: George H. W. Bush of Texas
- Vice-presidential nominee: Dan Quayle of Indiana

The 1988 Republican National Convention was held in the Louisiana Superdome in New Orleans, Louisiana, from August 15 to August 18, 1988. It was the second time that a major party held its convention in one of the five states known as the Deep South, coming on the heels of the 1988 Democratic National Convention, which was held in Atlanta, Georgia.

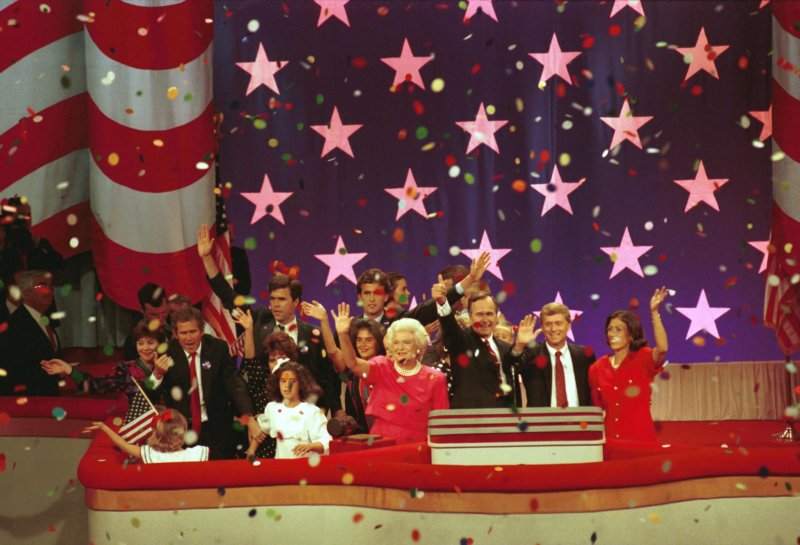
Bush and Quayle join their families on stage

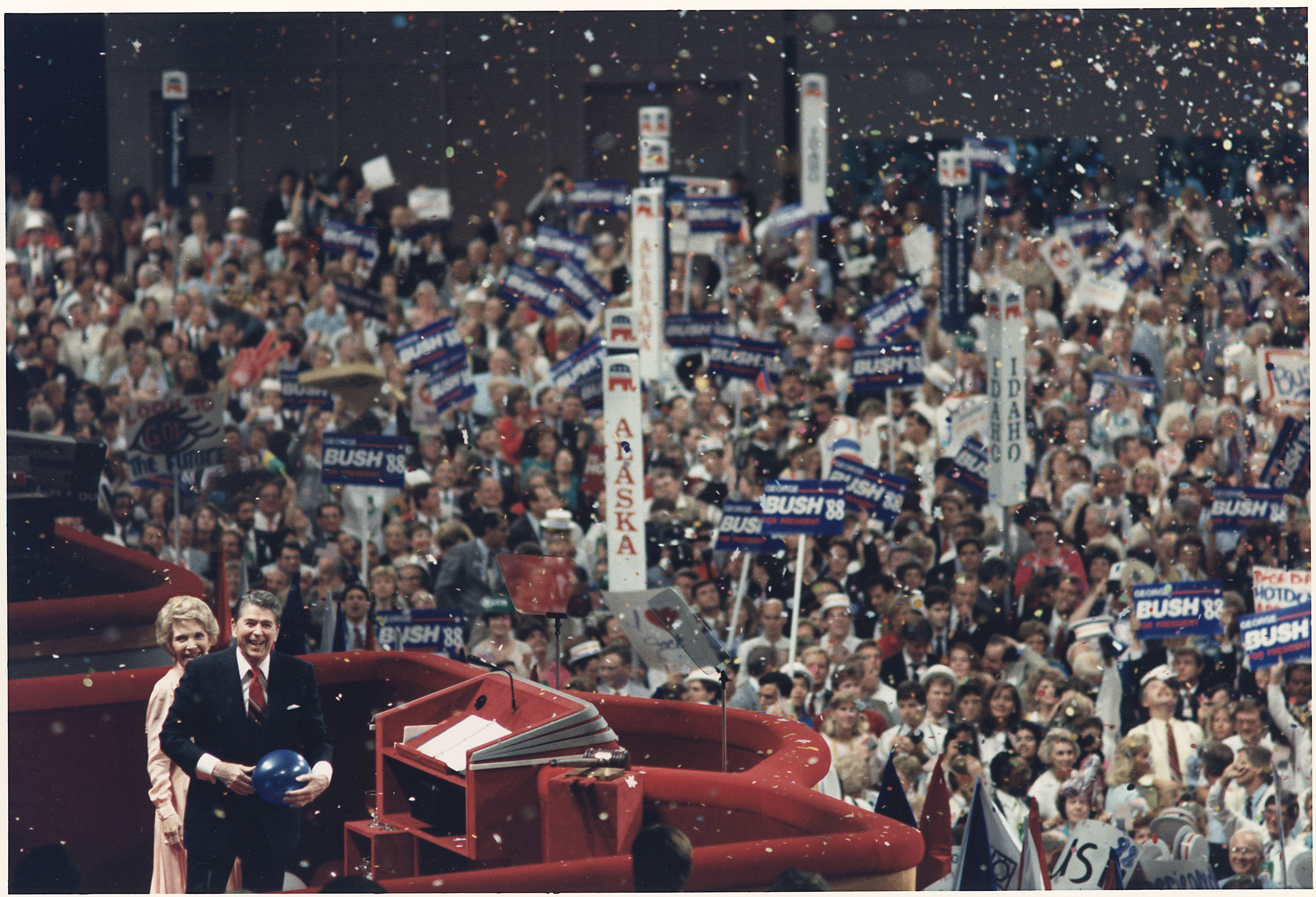
President and Mrs. Reagan address the 1988 Republican National Convention in the Superdome

The Republican National Convention nominated Vice President George H. W. Bush for President of the United States, as expected. The second spot on the ticket was not publicly known before the convention. As late as August 13, Bush had six people tabbed for consideration: House Representative Jack Kemp of New York, former United States Secretary of Transportation Elizabeth Dole, United States Senators Bob Dole of Kansas, Pete Domenici of New Mexico, Alan Simpson of Wyoming, and James Danforth "Dan" Quayle of Indiana. Others considered were Governors Jim Thompson of Illinois and George Deukmejian of California, but each declined consideration.

On August 16, Quayle was selected as Bush's vice presidential running mate. The revelation of Quayle's selection as running mate did not come until the second day of the convention, when NBC News broke the story. Until the 2024 Republican National Convention, it was the last time a major party's presidential candidate announced his vice presidential choice during his party's convention.

The convention featured speeches by Joe Paterno, Helen Hayes, Pat Robertson, a keynote address by New Jersey Governor Thomas Kean, and the music of the Jimmy Maxwell Orchestra.

The convention manager was Bill R. Phillips, former Chief of Staff of the Republican National Committee.

== Site selection ==
Republicans were seeking a host city that could provide a convention venue accommodating 17,000 and 20,000 hotel rooms.

On January 20, 1987, the site selection committee voted 6–3 in recommending New Orleans to serve as the site of the party's 1988 presidential nominating convention. The runner-up was Kansas City. Kansas City put forth Kemper Arena and the new Bartle Hall as prospective venues, with Bartle Hall seeming the more likely of the two facilities. The city's bid, however, was challenged by its lack of the 20,000 hotel rooms sought by the Republican Party, with the city only being able to offer around 15,000 hotel rooms. A third city, Atlanta, had been ruled out of consideration because the maximum capacity configuration that the Omni Coliseum could offer would accommodate only 15,000 seats, while the Republicans were seeking a minimum of 17,000 seats.

This was the first major party presidential nominating convention to be held in New Orleans. The size of the venue, the Louisiana Superdome, excited party officials, with Party Chairman Frank Fahrenkopf declaring that its size would allow a more extravagant convention to be staged. A factor that made New Orleans appealing to the Republican Party as a location included a significant supply of big hotels near the Superdome. The location choice was also intentionally reflective of the desire of the party to make further political inroads in the Southern United States.

In their contract with the city, the Republican Party included the clause forbidding the city from hosting another party's convention. This would prevent the Democratic Party from being able to choose New Orleans as their site too. New Orleans had been bidding for the Democratic Convention as well, and Republicans feared that if the Democratic Convention was held in the same city that the host committee would treat them with second-preference. Therefore, they required the city to withdraw from bidding for the Democratic convention. New Orleans attempted to negotiate on this, but the Republicans would not cede.

The convention was the first to be held in a domed sports stadium. A 900-by-90 feet curtain, installed by Superdome management in 1986 to enable the venue to hold events like political conventions, was utilized to partition half of the venue off.

=== Bids ===
Bid cities
City	Venue	Previous major party conventions hosted by city
Atlanta, Georgia	Omni Coliseum	—N/a
Kansas City, Missouri	Bartle Hall or Kemper Arena	Democratic: 1900; Republican: 1928 and 1976
New Orleans, Louisiana	Louisiana Superdome	—N/a

== Speakers ==
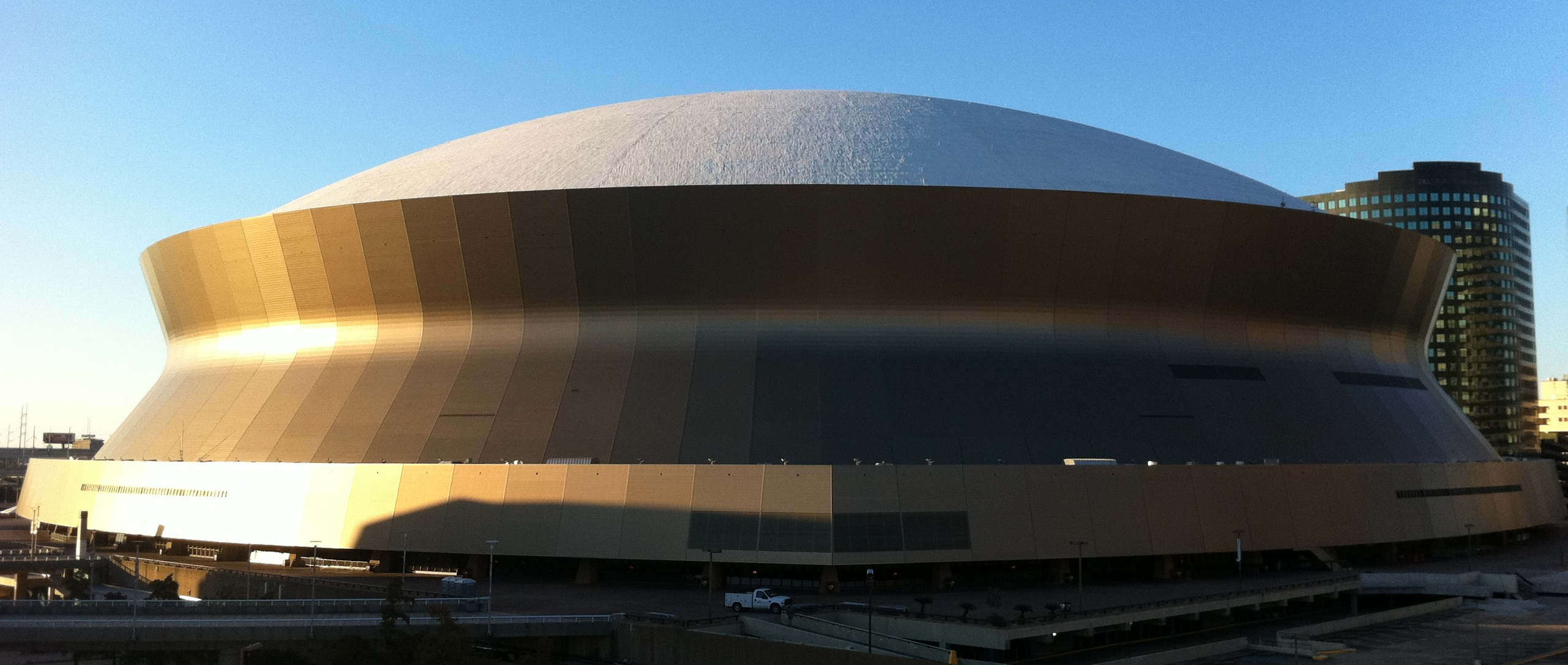
The Louisiana Superdome was the site of the 1988 Republican National Convention

The convention is perhaps best known for Bush's "thousand points of light" speech accepting the nomination. Written by Peggy Noonan and Craig R. Smith, it included the "read my lips: no new taxes" pledge that was the most popular sound bite coming out of the convention. The successful speech gave him a "bounce" that he was able to capitalize on to win the 1988 presidential election.

President Ronald and Nancy Reagan were honored on August 15. Reagan made a major speech on the opening night of the convention, as he would for the last time in 1992.

During the presidential roll call vote, several seconding speeches were delivered, showcasing a number of speakers from varying ethnic backgrounds. Seconding speeches were delivered by American football Coach Joe Paterno, Actress Helen Hayes, Congressman Bob Dornan, restaurateur Ninfa Laurenzo, Kansas City (Missouri) City Council Member Joanne Collins, and Federal Maritime Commissioner Elaine Chao.

Other speakers included Bob Dole, Elizabeth Dole, Arizona junior senator John McCain, Jeane Kirkpatrick and former President Gerald Ford.

Vice President Bush's acceptance speech

President Reagan's Remarks at the Republican National Convention on August 14, 1988

President Reagan's Address to the Republican National Convention, August 15, 1988

Nancy Reagan's Address to the Republican National Convention on August 15, 1988

Celebration after President Reagan's Speech at Republican National Convention on August 15, 1988

== Voting ==
The Balloting:
The presidential roll call began with Bush's name being placed into nomination by Senator Phil Gramm of Texas.

Candidates	
Name	George H. W. Bush
Certified Votes	2,044 (100%)
total:	2,044

With rumblings of opposition to the Quayle nomination, it was decided to have it ratified by voice vote, something that the Republicans had never done before, but would become standard practice in the decades to come.

== See also ==
- 1988 Republican Party presidential primaries
- George H. W. Bush 1988 presidential campaign
- History of the United States Republican Party
- List of Republican National Conventions
- U.S. presidential nomination convention
- 1987 Libertarian National Convention
- 1988 Democratic National Convention
- 1988 United States presidential election

Preceded by 1984; Dallas, Texas	1988; New Orleans, Louisiana	Succeeded by 1992; Houston, Texas
