= 2010 Libertarian National Convention =

United States political event

- 2010 United States elections

Convention
- Dates: 28–31 May 2010
- City: St Louis, Missouri
- Venue: Renaissance Hotel
- Chair: Bill Redpath

The 2010 Libertarian National Convention was a biennial convention of the Libertarian Party that was held in St. Louis, Missouri from Friday May 28 to Monday May 31, 2010.

Mark Hinkle was elected as National Chair; Mark W. Rutherford was elected National Vice Chair; Alicia Mattson was elected Secretary; James Oaksun was elected Treasurer.
