= Nancy Lord =

American politician (1952–2022)

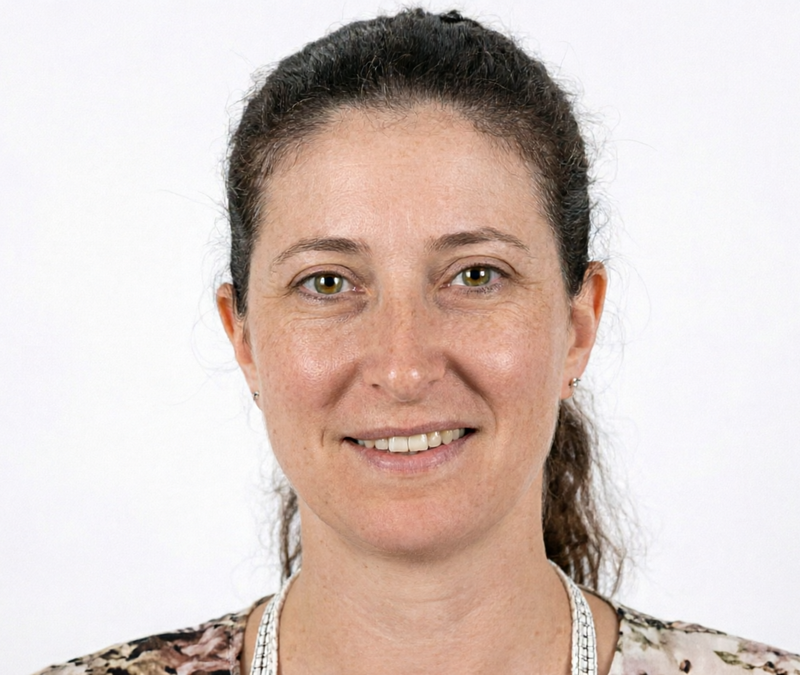
- Nancy Lord in 1996

Personal details
- Born: Nancy Theresa Lord; February 8, 1952 New York City, U.S.
- Died: February 14, 2022 (aged 70) Show Low, Arizona, U.S.
- Party: Libertarian
- Education: University of Maryland, College; Park; University of Maryland, Baltimore; Georgetown University

Nancy Theresa Lord (February 8, 1952 – February 14, 2022) was an American attorney and medical researcher who was the vice-presidential candidate of the Libertarian Party in the 1992 presidential election, as the running-mate of Andre Marrou. Marrou and Lord placed fourth in the popular vote with 290,087 votes (0.3%). Lord was the Libertarian candidate for Mayor of the District of Columbia in 1990. She also unsuccessfully ran for Nye County, Nevada District Attorney as a Republican in 2010.

Lord completed undergraduate and M.D. degrees at the University of Maryland. She earned her J.D. degree from Georgetown University Law Center. Until 1983, Lord was employed by Abbott Laboratories, where she authored the successful new drug application for benzodiazepine hypnotic ("ProSom"). After leaving Abbott, Lord worked as an independent consultant in the areas of pharmaceutical development, medical malpractice, and toxicology.

She served on the boards of directors for the National Organization for the Reform of Marijuana Laws (NORML) and for the Fully Informed Jury Association and wrote the introduction to the original edition of You and the Police by Boston T. Party. She was married to J.J. Johnson, an African-American organizer of the American militia movement.

Lord died on February 14, 2022, in Show Low, Arizona, following a bout with COVID-19.

Party political offices
Preceded by Andre Marrou	Libertarian nominee for Vice President of the United States; 1992	Succeeded by Jo Jorgensen
