= Andre Marrou =

American politician (born 1938)

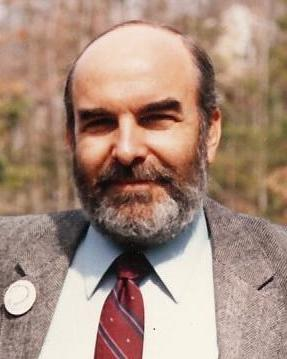
- Marrou in 1988

Member of the Alaska House of Representatives from the Seat B 5th district
- In office January 14, 1985 – January 19, 1987
- Preceded by: Milo Fritz
- Succeeded by: Claude Swackhammer

Personal details
- Born: Andrew Verne Marrou; December 4, 1938 (age 87) Nixon, Texas, U.S.
- Party: Libertarian
- Children: 3
- Education: Massachusetts Institute of Technology

Andrew Verne Marrou (/məˈruː/; December 4, 1938) is an American politician who served in the Alaska House of Representatives from the 5th district as a member of the Libertarian Party from 1985 to 1987. He was the Libertarian vice-presidential nominee in the 1988 election and presidential nominee in the 1992 election.

Marrou was born in Nixon, Texas, and educated at the Massachusetts Institute of Technology. He lived in Massachusetts until he moved to Alaska in 1973. He joined the Alaska Libertarian Party in 1976, and became its vice chair. He unsuccessfully sought a seat in the state house in 1982, before being elected in 1984, but lost reelection.

== Early life ==
Andrew Verne Marrou was born in Nixon, Texas, on December 4, 1938, to Andrew Noil Marrou. He graduated from San Marcos High School and considered becoming a Methodist minister. He was one of the first people to receive a National Merit Scholarship and graduated from the Massachusetts Institute of Technology with a bachelor's degree in 1962. He was given the nickname Andre by French roommates at MIT.

Marrou was a member of the United States Coast Guard Auxiliary in Massachusetts and Civil Air Patrol in Alaska. He lived in Boston until he moved to Alaska in 1973. Marrou joined the Libertarian Party in September 1976 after being handed a brochure in Anchorage. He became vice chair of the Alaska Libertarian Party. He moved to Homer and established a Libertarian affiliate there. They moved onto Perl Island in 1978, before returning to Homer in 1980. In 1986, he moved to Las Vegas, Nevada, where he worked as a real estate broker.

== Career ==
=== Alaska House of Representatives ===
Marrou ran for Seat B from the 5th district in the Alaska House of Representatives in 1982, but placed second out of three candidates. He was elected to the state house in 1984, after defeating incumbent Republican Representative Milo Fritz by 56 votes. Marrou was the third Libertarian member of the state house after Dick Randolph and Ken Fanning. Marrou spent $21,600 during the campaign, with television advertising costing $10,150. Fritz asked Lieutenant Governor Steve McAlpine to decertify Marrou's victory claiming that Marrou knowingly lied on his conflict-of-interest form, but McAlpine declined. Marrou lost reelection to Democratic nominee C.E. Swackhammer in 1986.

Marrou declined to join the Democratic and Republican caucuses. During his tenure in the state legislature he served on the Community and Regional Affairs and Transportation committees. He introduced more bills than any other member of the state house, but only one was passed.

=== Vice presidential campaign ===
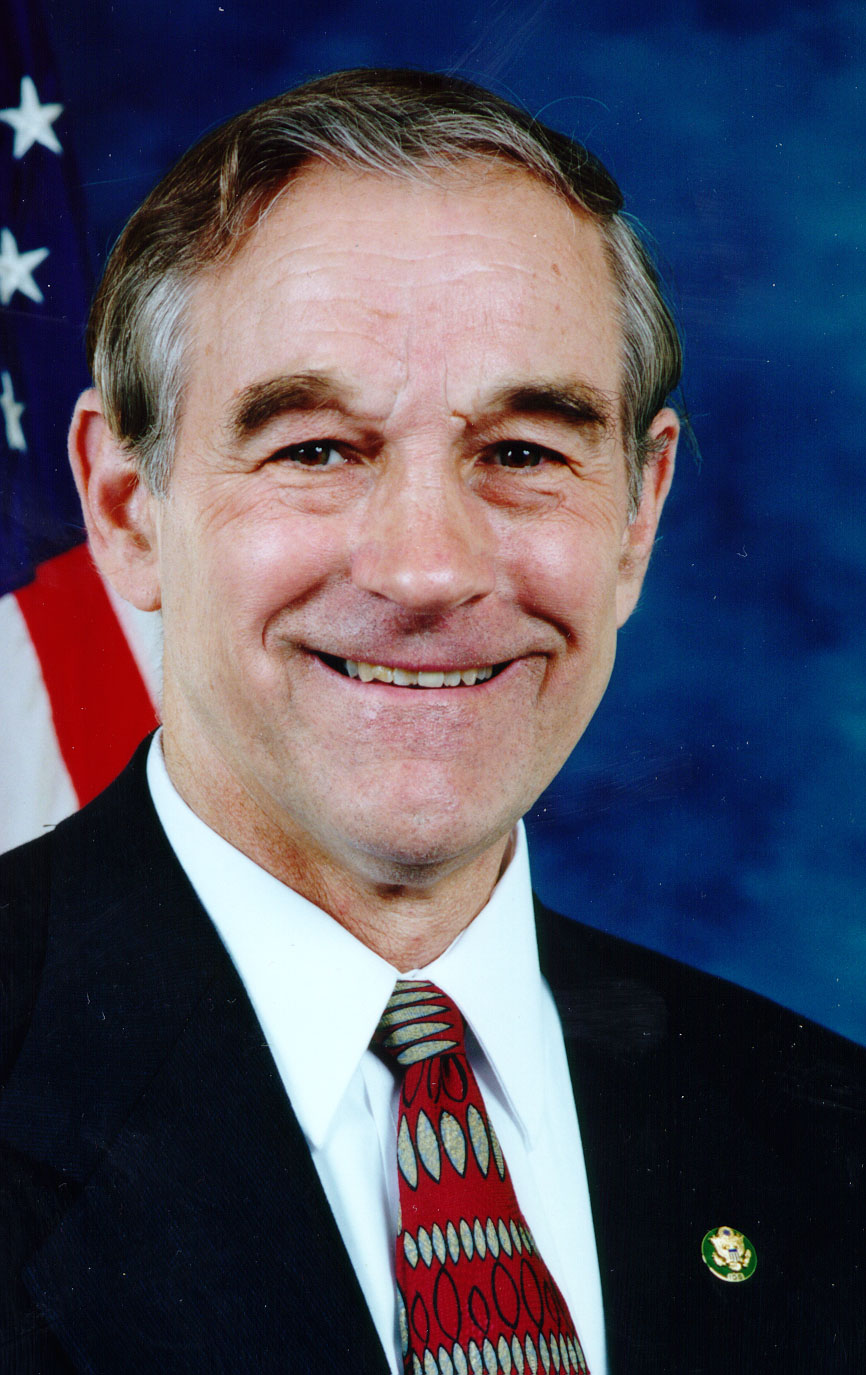
Ron Paul and Marrou were the Libertarian presidential and vice-presidential nominees in the 1988 presidential election.

In February 1987, Marrou announced at the Libertarian Party of California's state convention that he would seek the party's vice presidential nomination. John Vernon nominated Marrou for the presidential nomination, but he declined. Three delegates voted for him on the presidential ballot. Ron Paul won the presidential nomination while Marrou, after being nominated by David Bergland and seconded by Tonie Nathan and Michael Emerling, won the vice presidential nomination. Perry Willis was the chair of Marrou's vice-presidential campaign.

Marrou received one write-in vote in the New Hampshire Libertarian vice-presidential primary during the 1996 presidential election. Irwin Schiff won with a plurality of write-in votes.

=== Presidential campaign ===
Marrou announced his presidential campaign to LP News and launched it on November 7, 1990, with James A. Lewis as his campaign manager. He won the Libertarian presidential nomination for the 1992 presidential election at the national convention on August 31, 1991. He wanted a woman to serve as his vice-presidential running mate and favored Mary Ruwart, but she lost the nomination to Nancy Lord.

Marrou spent $30,000 in New Hampshire during the 1992 primary. He won the Libertarian presidential primary without opposition, received 99 write-in votes in the Republican votes, and 70 write-in votes in the Democratic primary. He received more votes in Dixville Notch's midnight vote than the winners of the Republican and Democratic primaries. He also won the California and Nebraska primaries without opposition.

Members of Marrou's campaign staff resign during the summer of 1992. Several of his former campaign staffers sought to have him removed as the party's presidential nominee because he had unpaid child support, could not enter Massachusetts without being arrested for outstanding contempt of court charges, claimed to have been married twice when it was in fact four times, investigated for campaign improprieties from his time in Alaska, was reportedly running up unpaid credit card bills in a campaign PAC's name without their approval, and was habitually months late in making his house payments. The national committee decided to take no action for fear it ruin the party's reputation.

Marrou meant to participate in a debate in Richmond, Virginia, with Lenora Fulani and a representative for Lyndon LaRouche on October 15. However, he had a commitment in California and was instead represented by Steve Givot.

Marrou wanted to accept matching funds as "it is a moral imperative that we reclaim looted tax money and use it to defend ourselves". However, he failed to qualify for the funds. He raised $824,168.00 and spent $830,840.00 during the campaign. He placed fourth in the election with 291,628 votes worth 0.28% of the popular vote.

== Personal life ==
Marrou divorced four times. He had two sons and adopted one with a wife he divorced in 1971. He married Norma Segal, the former chair of the Libertarian Party of New York. His brother is American television news personality and Judge Chris Marrou. He was married to Eileen in the 1980s.

== Political positions ==
Marrou supports abolishing the Internal Revenue Service, Federal Reserve, and income tax. He supports abortion and gay rights. He supported eliminating all border restrictions. He supported repealing the Merchant Marine Act of 1920 and eliminating all tariffs.

Marrou supported limiting members of the Alaska state house and senate to four two-year terms and two four-year terms respectively. He proposed legislation to abolish the Alaska Transportation Commission. He opposed legislation requiring drivers to wear seatbelts.

== Electoral history ==
1982 Alaska House of Representatives 5th district Seat B election
Party	Candidate	Votes	%	±%
Republican	Milo Fritz (incumbent)	4,781	48.98%	
Libertarian	Andre Marrou	2,715	27.81%	
Democratic	Chris Martin	2,266	23.21%	
Total votes		9,762	100.00%	

1984 Alaska House of Representatives 5th district Seat B primary
Party	Candidate	Votes	%	±%
Libertarian	Andre Marrou	1,024	100.00%	
Total votes		1,024	100.00%	

1984 Alaska House of Representatives 5th district Seat B election
Party	Candidate	Votes	%	±%
Libertarian	Andre Marrou	4,539	40.52%	
Republican	Milo Fritz (incumbent)	4,483	40.02%	
Democratic	Chris Martin	2,180	19.46%	
Total votes		11,202	100.00%	

1986 Alaska House of Representatives 5th district Seat B primary
Party	Candidate	Votes	%	±%
Libertarian	Andre Marrou (incumbent)	2,455	100.00%	
Total votes		2,455	100.00%	

1986 Alaska House of Representatives 5th district Seat B election
Party	Candidate	Votes	%	±%
Democratic	C.E. Swackhammer	4,467	41.70%	
Libertarian	Andre Marrou (incumbent)	3,838	35.83%	
Republican	Marilyn Dimmick	2,398	22.39%	
Write-ins	Write-ins	8	0.07%	
Total votes		10,711	100.00%	

1992 New Hampshire Libertarian presidential primary
Party	Candidate	Votes	%	±%
Libertarian	Andre Marrou	3,219	100.00%	
Total votes		3,219	100.00%	

1992 Nebraska Libertarian presidential primary
Party	Candidate	Votes	%	±%
Libertarian	Andre Marrou	32	96.97%	
Libertarian	Write-ins	1	3.03%	
Total votes		33	100.00%	

1992 California Libertarian presidential primary
Party	Candidate	Votes	%	±%
Libertarian	Andre Marrou	15,002	100.00%	
Total votes		15,002	100.00%	

== Works cited ==
- Alaska State Legislature Directory, Fourteenth Legislature 1985-1986. Alaska Legislature. 1985.
- Beermann, Allen (1992). Official Report of the Board of State Canvassers of the State of Nebraska. Secretary of State of Nebraska.
- Doherty, Brian (2007). Radicals for Capitalism. PublicAffairs. ISBN 9781586483500.
- Eu, March (1992). Statement of Vote: Primary Election June 2, 1992 (PDF). Secretary of State of California.
- Hazlett, Joseph (1992). The Libertarian Party and Other Minor Political Parties in the United States. McFarland & Company. ISBN 0899506933.
- Klein, Patricia (1993). Federal Elections 92 (PDF). Federal Election Commission.
- Ladd, Karen (1993). State of New Hampshire Manual for the General Court. New Hampshire Department of State.
- Ladd, Karen (1997). State of New Hampshire Manual for the General Court. New Hampshire Department of State.

Alaska House of Representatives
Preceded by Milo Fritz	Member of the Alaska House of Representatives from the 5th district Seat B 1985–1987	Succeeded by Claude Swackhammer
Party political offices
Preceded by Jim Lewis	Libertarian nominee for Vice President of the United States; 1988	Succeeded by Nancy Lord
Preceded by Ron Paul	Libertarian nominee for President of the United States; 1992	Succeeded by Harry Browne
