= Libertarian Party of Washington =

- Chairperson: C. Michael Pickens
- Founded: 1972
- Ideology: Libertarianism
- National affiliation: Libertarian Party (United States)
- Colors: Gold
- Washington Senate: 0 / 49
- Washington House of Representatives: 0 / 98
- U.S. Senate (Washington): 0 / 2
- U.S. House of Representatives (Washington): 0 / 10
- Other elected officials: 1 (June 2024)

Website
- www.lpwa.org

The Libertarian Party of Washington (LPWA) is the Washington state affiliate of the Libertarian Party. Founded in 1972, the party advocates individual liberty, limited government, and free markets.

The party's stated purposes include endorsing Libertarian candidates in Washington, coordinating regional organizations, selecting delegates to national Libertarian conventions, and supporting ballot access for the national party's presidential ticket.

== Principles and policy positions ==
The party's statement of principles emphasizes individual autonomy, freedom of speech, private property, and voluntary exchange, and opposes the initiation of force. Its membership requirements include endorsing a statement rejecting the initiation of force to achieve political or social goals.

According to its published platform summary, the party supports school choice, criminal justice reform concerning victimless conduct, market-based healthcare, and environmental protection through property rights, voluntary action, and market incentives.

== History of the Libertarian Party in Washington State ==
=== Founding ===
The Libertarian Party of Washington was founded in 1972. H. W. "Skip" Barron's biography in Washington's 1974 voters' pamphlet identified him as the party's founder and state chairman.

=== Legal advocacy ===
The party challenged Washington's requirements for minor-party access to the ballot in Libertarian Party of Washington v. Munro. The lawsuit concerned procedures requiring minor-party candidates to announce their candidacies earlier than major-party candidates, as well as differences in the rules for filling vacancies on party tickets. In July 1994, the United States Court of Appeals for the Ninth Circuit upheld the challenged procedures.

In 2005, the party joined the Washington Republican and Democratic parties in litigation challenging Initiative 872, which established the state's top-two primary system. The parties argued that allowing candidates to identify a party preference without that party's endorsement infringed their freedom of association. In Washington State Grange v. Washington State Republican Party, the United States Supreme Court rejected the facial constitutional challenge in March 2008.

The party also participated in litigation concerning same-sex marriage. Together with the Log Cabin Republicans of Washington, it submitted an amicus brief in Andersen v. King County supporting marriage rights for same-sex couples. The Washington Supreme Court upheld the state's prohibition on same-sex marriage in 2006.

=== Organizational changes ===
At its May 31, 2014 convention, the party replaced its executive committee and elected C. Michael Pickens as chairman, Chris Strong as vice chairman, Sean Treasure as treasurer, and Steven Nielson as secretary. The reorganization replaced five at-large representatives with seven regional representatives and changed leadership terms from two years to one. Regional representatives were assigned responsibility for establishing county organizations within their respective regions.

=== Recent developments ===
In April 2024, the party held its annual convention at the Woman's Club of Spokane. Reporting on the convention, The Inlander described a decline in dues-paying membership to approximately 180, compared with approximately 400 in 2020, according to outgoing chair Anna Duque.

Before the March 2026 convention in Ruston, proposals were introduced to dissolve the party and revise its organizational purpose. According to the party's April newsletter, the dissolution motion failed, delegates adopted an amended purpose statement, and Pickens returned as chairman. The adopted changes permitted community and educational activities outside electoral politics while retaining support for ballot access for the national party's presidential ticket.

Later in 2026, the party described its membership as growing and promoted recruitment through its website, volunteer programs, and local affiliates. Its October newsletter invited members to help organize committees for membership recruitment, convention planning, candidate support, and bylaws review.

In March 2026, the party revived its monthly newsletter, The Washington Libertarian, following a hiatus. Monthly issues continued through October, with coverage of party business, local events, public policy, and commentary from members. The publication was made available through the party's website in PDF format, with later issues also offered as online articles. The party recruited volunteers to contribute writing, photography, artwork, editing, and local reports.

The party used its social media accounts to publicize events and distribute updates, alongside its website and newsletter. Its online outreach also included a Discord community and a Reddit forum, r/LPWA, announced in July 2026 for discussion of Washington issues, local activities, and opportunities to participate.

Youth outreach included a dedicated website page for Young Libertarians of Washington, linking to the group's Facebook, Instagram, and TikTok accounts.

Local activities during 2026 included recurring county meetups, public forums, and social gatherings. The October newsletter listed meetings in Skagit, Kitsap, Thurston, Spokane, Clark, and Pierce counties, and reported on a camping trip and events with former Libertarian presidential nominee Chase Oliver in Burien and Mountlake Terrace.

== Election History ==
=== 1972 elections ===
The Libertarian Party of Washington was founded in 1972. In that year's general election, the national Libertarian presidential ticket of John Hospers and Tonie Nathan received 1,537 votes (0.10%) in Washington. David Odden received 154 votes (0.51%) for House position 1 in the 36th legislative district.

=== 1974 elections ===
Richard R. Dyment received 697 votes (3.21%) for House position 1 in the 36th legislative district, finishing behind incumbent Helen Sommers and Republican Edward Lubin. Contemporary reporting in Reason also identified Skip Barron as a Libertarian legislative candidate and reported that he received approximately 12% of the vote.

=== 1976 elections ===
Richard K. Kenney received 19,373 votes (1.30%) for the U.S. Senate, while Maurice W. Willey received 4,133 votes (0.27%) for governor. Libertarian congressional candidates included Alan M. Gottlieb, who received 4,230 votes (1.88%) in the 1st district, and D. E. Bear Sandahl, who received 1,959 votes (0.94%) in the 5th district. The presidential ticket of Roger MacBride and David Bergland received 5,042 votes (0.32%) in Washington.

=== 1977 elections ===
Richard K. Kenney was listed as a Libertarian congressional candidate in Washington in 1977.

=== 1978 elections ===
John H. Addison ran as the Libertarian candidate in Washington's 1st congressional district. He received 3,545 votes, finishing behind Republican incumbent Joel Pritchard and Democrat Janice Niemi.

=== 1980 elections ===
The Libertarian presidential ticket of Ed Clark and David Koch received 29,213 votes in Washington. In congressional races, Maurice Willey received 8,229 votes in the 1st district and William L. McCord received 9,047 votes in the 2nd district. Neither congressional candidate was elected.

=== 1982 elections ===
Libertarian legislative candidates included H. W. (Skip) Barron, who received 1,160 votes (3.48%) for the State Senate in the 36th district; Phyllis R. Clark, who received 1,027 votes (5.05%) for House position 1 in the 29th district; and John Trinnes, who received 526 votes (2.73%) for House position 2 in the same district. None won their contests.

=== 1984 elections ===
The Libertarian presidential ticket headed by David Bergland received 8,844 votes (0.47%) in Washington. Dan Blachly received 2,953 votes (1.57%) in the 6th congressional district, finishing third behind incumbent Norm Dicks and Republican Michael H. Lonergan.

=== 1986 elections ===
Karen Allard received 787 votes for House position 1 in the 26th legislative district. Democrat Ron Meyers won with 15,016 votes, ahead of Republican Cathy Shaffer's 13,479 votes.

=== 1988 elections ===
The Libertarian presidential ticket headed by Ron Paul received 17,240 votes (0.92%) in Washington.

=== 1990 elections ===
William L. McCord received 15,165 votes (8.25%) in the 2nd congressional district, finishing third behind incumbent Democrat Al Swift and Republican Doug Smith.

=== 1992 elections ===
The Libertarian presidential ticket headed by Andre Marrou received 7,533 votes (0.33%) in Washington. Jim Horrigan received 4,075 votes (1.71%) in the 6th congressional district, finishing behind incumbent Norm Dicks, Republican Lauri J. Phillips, and independent Tom Donnelly.

=== 1994 elections ===
John Gearhart received 6,386 votes (21.24%) for House position 1 in the 9th legislative district. Republican incumbent Larry Sheahan won with 23,676 votes (78.76%).

=== 1995 elections ===
Art Rathjen contested the special election for the State Senate in the 43rd legislative district. Contemporary reporting put his share at approximately 10%. The same report identified Jim Campton as a Libertarian candidate for the Federal Way City Council and reported that he received approximately 22% of the vote.

=== 1996 elections ===
Arthur (Art) Rathjen received 39,277 votes (1.84%) for lieutenant governor, and Richard Shepard received 58,672 votes (2.75%) for attorney general. Neither were elected. The presidential ticket of Harry Browne and Jo Jorgensen received 12,522 votes (0.56%) in Washington.

=== 1997 elections ===
John Gearhart was elected to the Palouse City Council in an uncontested nonpartisan race. A contemporary Libertarian publication identified his election as one of the party's local victories.

=== 1998 elections ===
Mike Harrington ran for House position 1 in the 8th legislative district. A compilation of official primary returns submitted in federal court recorded 2,105 primary votes (13.04%) for Harrington, identifying him as a Libertarian.

=== 1999 elections ===
Ballot Access News reported five Libertarian victories in nonpartisan local races in Washington: Mark Taff and Eva Hart for the Colville City Council, Mike Hihn for a water commissioner position in King County, and Heidi Duty and Morgan Duty for cemetery board positions in Spokane.

=== 2000 elections ===
Jeff Jared received 64,734 votes (2.63%) for the U.S. Senate, and the presidential ticket of Harry Browne and Art Olivier received 13,135 votes (0.53%) in Washington. Libertarians also contested eight state executive offices. Ruth E. Bennett received 179,567 votes (7.81%) for lieutenant governor, Steve Layman received 125,985 (5.40%) for commissioner of public lands, and Chris Caputo received 123,058 (5.47%) for auditor.

2000 state executive general-election results
Candidate	Office	Votes	Vote share
Steve W. LePage	Governor	47,819	1.94%
Ruth E. Bennett	Lieutenant governor	179,567	7.81%
J. Bradley Gibson	Secretary of state	94,202	4.13%
Tim Perman	Treasurer	96,910	4.27%
Richard Shepard	Attorney general	90,941	3.94%
Steve Layman	Commissioner of public lands	125,985	5.40%
Mike Hihn	Insurance commissioner	92,185	4.19%
Chris Caputo	Auditor	123,058	5.47%

=== 2001 elections ===
Michael Enquist and Thomas Kinnebrew ran as Libertarians in legislative special elections. Enquist received 516 votes (1.59%) for House position 2 in the 21st district, and Kinnebrew received 779 votes (2.76%) for House position 2 in the 38th district. In Snohomish County Council races, Frank V. Ball Sr. received 1,006 votes (2.96%) in district 1, and Don Polson received 1,085 votes (3.32%) in district 5. None was elected.

=== 2002 elections ===
Seven Libertarian candidates appeared in Washington's congressional general elections. Rob Chase received 10,379 votes (5.13%) in the 5th district, and Bruce Guthrie received 4,326 votes (2.14%) in the 2nd district. None of the seven won a seat.

2002 congressional general-election results
District	Candidate	Votes	Vote share
1	Mark B. Wilson	6,251	3.05%
2	Bruce Guthrie	4,326	2.14%
5	Rob Chase	10,379	5.13%
6	John A. Bennett	8,744	4.45%
7	Stan Lippmann	8,447	4.00%
8	Mark A. Taff	5,771	2.84%
9	J. Mills	4,759	2.91%

=== 2003 elections ===
Ballot Access News reported that one Libertarian won a nonpartisan local election in Washington on November 4, 2003.

=== 2004 elections ===
Ruth Bennett received 63,464 votes in the gubernatorial election after the recounts. J. S. Mills received 34,055 votes (1.21%) for the U.S. Senate. The presidential ticket of Michael Badnarik and Richard Campagna received 11,955 votes (0.42%) in Washington.

=== 2005 elections ===
Judi Roberts Fiest ran as a Libertarian in the special election for House position 1 in the 19th legislative district. The certified returns recorded 1,687 votes for Fiest, 12,807 for Republican Dawn Courtney, and 21,763 for winning Democratic incumbent Dean Takko.

=== 2006 elections ===
Bruce Guthrie received 29,331 votes (1.41%) for the U.S. Senate. Incumbent Democrat Maria Cantwell won reelection.

=== 2008 elections ===
Ruth Bennett received 5,017 votes (10.56%) for House position 2 in the 37th legislative district, losing to incumbent Eric Pettigrew. John H. Beck received 3,673 votes (2.14%) in the primary for the 5th congressional district and did not advance. The presidential ticket of Bob Barr and Wayne Allyn Root received 12,728 votes (0.42%) in Washington.

=== 2010 elections ===
The national Libertarian Party included incumbent Richard B. Sanders on its published list of candidates in the 2010 election. His race for Washington Supreme Court position 6 was nonpartisan. Sanders received 971,803 votes (49.66%) in the certified general-election results, losing to Charlie Wiggins, who received 984,948 votes (50.34%).

=== 2012 elections ===
The Libertarian presidential ticket of Gary Johnson and James P. Gray received 42,202 votes (1.35%) in Washington.

=== 2013 elections ===
Sean Olson appeared on the primary ballot for Snohomish County Council district 1 with the preference "Ind. Libertarian Party". He received 1,153 votes (5.87%), finishing fifth and not advancing to the general election.

=== 2014 elections ===
Eight candidates listing a Libertarian preference contested legislative general elections. Steven Nielson received 9,734 votes (28.16%) for House position 2 in the 2nd district, and David A. Steenson received 12,838 votes (33.05%) for House position 1 in the 19th district. None of the eight was elected.

2014 legislative general-election results
District and House position	Candidate	Votes	Vote share
2, position 2	Steven Nielson	9,734	28.16%
3, position 2	Paul Delaney	9,935	30.53%
7, position 1	James R. Apker	9,528	20.20%
10, position 1	Michael Scott	11,544	23.72%
19, position 1	David A. Steenson	12,838	33.05%
36, position 2	Paul Addis	7,472	13.84%
38, position 2	Elijah Olson	9,957	32.97%
48, position 2	Tim Turner	11,049	30.81%

=== 2015 elections ===
Candidates identified as Libertarians in contemporary reporting included Barbara Brenner and Joshua Penner. Brenner won reelection to Whatcom County Council district 3, position B, receiving 39,852 votes as the only named candidate. Penner won Orting City Council position 6 with 754 votes (58.40%), defeating Arlene Dannat, and also won Pierce County Charter Review Commission district 1, position 3, with 10,613 votes (56.45%). Former party chair C. Michael Pickens reported that the party supported 17 campaigns in 2015 and that five newly elected Libertarians won office.

=== 2016 elections ===
Joshua B. Trumbull advanced to the general election for attorney general and received 979,105 votes (32.86%), losing to incumbent Bob Ferguson. In other statewide primaries, Paul Addis received 26,304 votes (1.99%) for lieutenant governor, Tim Turner received 80,570 (5.98%) for secretary of state, Steven M. Nielson received 63,056 (4.84%) for commissioner of public lands, and Justin Murta received 99,181 (7.50%) for insurance commissioner. Each listed a Libertarian preference; none of these four advanced. Mike Luke received 20,988 votes (1.52%) in the U.S. Senate primary and did not advance. The presidential ticket of Gary Johnson and Bill Weld received 160,879 votes in Washington.

Ten candidates listing a Libertarian preference reached legislative general elections; none won.

2016 legislative general-election results
Office and district	Candidate	Votes	Vote share
Senate, 3	James R. Apker	16,395	32.68%
Senate, 11	Dennis Price	12,010	23.64%
House, 3, position 1	Randy McGlenn II	16,260	32.69%
House, 7, position 2	Mike Foster	14,946	23.14%
House, 10, position 1	Michael Scott	18,778	28.05%
House, 21, position 1	Alex Hels	16,639	27.81%
House, 31, position 1	John Frostad	16,976	28.41%
House, 46, position 1	Stephanie Heart Viskovich	11,371	15.12%
House, 48, position 1	Michelle Darnell	16,824	29.88%
House, 48, position 2	Benjamin Judah Phelps	15,302	27.36%

=== 2017 elections ===
Michelle Darnell and Ciaran Dougherty advanced to the general election in special elections in the 48th legislative district. Darnell received 9,553 votes (31.05%) for the State Senate, losing to Patty Kuderer; Dougherty received 7,812 votes (25.91%) for House position 1, losing to Vandana Slatter.

2017 legislative special elections
Candidate	Office	Primary votes (%)	General-election votes (%)	Outcome
Michelle Darnell	State Senate, district 48	5,469 (22.97%)	9,553 (31.05%)	Lost general election
Ciaran Dougherty	State House, district 48, position 1	5,222 (22.60%)	7,812 (25.91%)	Lost general election

In nonpartisan local elections, the national Libertarian Party identified Kevin Cline, Paul Addis, Ed Pace, and James Blair as Libertarian candidates. Cline won Long Beach City Council position 4 with 209 votes (58.87%). Addis, Pace, and Blair lost their respective council races. Libertarian Casey Carlisle also ran for mayor of Seattle, receiving 1,309 votes (0.71%) in the primary and failing to advance.

Documented 2017 local candidacies
Candidate	Office	Election stage	Votes	Percentage	Outcome
Kevin Cline	Long Beach City Council, position 4	General	209	58.87%	Elected
Paul Addis	Kent City Council, position 2	General	7,605	42.43%	Lost
Ed Pace	Spokane Valley City Council, position 4	General	6,658	41.38%	Lost
James Blair	Yelm City Council, position 7	General	556	46.72%	Lost
Casey Carlisle	Mayor of Seattle	Primary	1,309	0.71%	Did not advance

=== 2018 elections ===
The 2018 primary included nine legislative candidates and three federal candidates who stated a Libertarian Party preference. Brian Luke finished second in the six-candidate primary for the 2nd congressional district and advanced to the general election, where he received 84,646 votes (28.71%) against incumbent Rick Larsen. Allen Acosta, Bryan Simonson, Sydney Gillman Wissel, and Matt Dubin also reached the legislative general election; all four lost.

2018 Libertarian legislative and federal candidates
Candidate	Office	Primary votes (%)	General-election votes (%)	Outcome
Mike Luke	U.S. Senate	12,302 (0.72%)	Did not advance	Lost primary
Brian Luke	U.S. House, district 2	12,320 (7.87%)	84,646 (28.71%)	Lost general election
Richard Travis Reyes	U.S. House, district 8	1,154 (0.68%)	Did not advance	Lost primary
Matt Seymour	State House, district 1, position 2	2,121 (5.91%)	Did not advance	Lost primary
Ryan Cooper	State Senate, district 8	1,615 (5.14%)	Did not advance	Lost primary
Allen Acosta	State House, district 22, position 2	8,321 (22.64%)	20,151 (30.34%)	Lost general election
Charles Schaefer	State Senate, district 33	1,629 (6.73%)	Did not advance	Lost primary
Bryan Simonson	State Senate, district 36	5,389 (10.63%)	9,707 (10.97%)	Lost general election
Sydney Gillman Wissel	State House, district 36, position 1	5,448 (10.87%)	9,958 (11.38%)	Lost general election
Matt Dubin	State House, district 36, position 2	6,644 (13.17%)	12,205 (13.93%)	Lost general election
Nathaniel Deily	State House, district 41, position 1	818 (2.04%)	Did not advance	Lost primary
Jeremy Fitch	State Senate, district 44	1,365 (3.86%)	Did not advance	Lost primary

=== 2019 elections ===
James Blair, whom the national Libertarian Party had identified as a Libertarian candidate in 2017, was elected to Yelm City Council position 1 in 2019. He received 693 votes (50.84%), defeating incumbent EJ Curry, who received 663 votes (48.64%).

=== 2020 elections ===
In 2020, Libertarian presidential nominees Jo Jorgensen and Jeremy "Spike" Cohen received 80,500 votes (1.97%) in Washington. Twelve candidates stated a Libertarian preference in the state executive, congressional, and legislative primaries. Anthony Welti received 324,921 votes (13.67%) for insurance commissioner, finishing third and failing to advance. Brett Borden, Marliza Melzer, and David Wiley reached the legislative general election, receiving 16,091 votes (24.67%), 15,123 (25.98%), and 20,810 (32.20%), respectively. All three lost.

2020 Libertarian state and congressional candidates
Candidate	Office	Primary votes (%)	General-election votes (%)	Outcome
Jared Frerichs	Lieutenant governor	20,847 (0.87%)	Did not advance	Lost primary
Matt Seymour	Lieutenant governor	27,125 (1.14%)	Did not advance	Lost primary
Kelsey Reyes	Commissioner of public lands	77,407 (3.27%)	Did not advance	Lost primary
Anthony Welti	Insurance commissioner	324,921 (13.67%)	Did not advance	Lost primary
Steven Skelton	U.S. House, district 1	7,286 (2.73%)	Did not advance	Lost primary
Ryan Cooper	U.S. House, district 4	4,080 (2.30%)	Did not advance	Lost primary
Jorge Besada	U.S. House, district 9	4,792 (2.42%)	Did not advance	Lost primary
Brett Borden	State House, district 9, position 1	7,889 (21.00%)	16,091 (24.67%)	Lost general election
Allen Acosta	State House, district 22, position 1	3,004 (5.15%)	Did not advance	Lost primary
Marliza Melzer	State House, district 33, position 2	7,159 (22.45%)	15,123 (25.98%)	Lost general election
Jorge Garrido	State House, district 38, position 1	2,068 (5.24%)	Did not advance	Lost primary
David Wiley	State House, district 38, position 2	11,568 (30.91%)	20,810 (32.20%)	Lost general election

=== 2022 elections ===
David Wiley ran for State House district 38, position 2, receiving 1,004 votes (3.25%) in the primary. Justin Greywolf ran for the U.S. House in the 8th congressional district and received 1,518 votes (0.74%). Neither advanced to the general election.

=== 2023 elections ===
Former state party chair Randy McGlenn II contested Spokane City Council district 3, position 1, in the 2023 nonpartisan primary. He received 772 votes (4.09%), finishing sixth among the named candidates and failing to advance. Alan Rubio, identified by The Everett Herald as a Libertarian Party member in 2023, ran for Alderwood Water and Wastewater District commissioner position 3. He received 4,074 votes (13.46%) and did not advance.

=== 2024 elections ===
Libertarian presidential nominees Chase Oliver and Mike ter Maat received 16,428 votes (0.42%) in Washington in 2024. Michael DePaula ran for governor, receiving 3,957 votes (0.20%) in the primary and failing to advance. Four candidates stated a Libertarian preference in legislative races. Justin Greywolf and Matt McCally reached the general election, receiving 12,508 votes (22.16%) and 6,115 votes (8.51%), respectively. Both lost to Democratic incumbents.

2024 Libertarian state candidates
Candidate	Office	Primary votes (%)	General-election votes (%)	Outcome
Michael DePaula	Governor	3,957 (0.20%)	Did not advance	Lost primary
Justin Greywolf	State House, district 11, position 2	4,607 (18.19%)	12,508 (22.16%)	Lost general election
Justin Franks	State House, district 19, position 2	1,469 (3.43%)	Did not advance	Lost primary
Bruce Guthrie	State House, district 21, position 2	3,555 (10.19%)	Did not advance	Lost primary
Matt McCally	State House, district 37, position 2	1,972 (5.53%)	6,115 (8.51%)	Lost general election

=== 2025 elections ===
The party endorsed members Cobi Clark for Auburn City Council position 6 and Alan Rubio for Everett City Council district 4 in the 2025 nonpartisan elections. Both advanced to the general election. Clark received 5,588 votes (40.93%) across King and Pierce counties, losing to Lisa Stirgus, who received 8,000 votes (58.60%). Rubio received 997 votes (47.27%), losing to Luis Burbano, who received 1,104 votes (52.35%).

Documented 2025 Libertarian local candidates
Candidate	Office	Primary votes (%)	General-election votes (%)	Outcome
Cobi Clark	Auburn City Council, position 6	2,841 (28.67%)	5,588 (40.93%)	Lost general election
Alan Rubio	Everett City Council, district 4	497 (33.07%)	997 (47.27%)	Lost general election

=== 2026 elections ===
In 2026, the party listed Cobi Clark as a candidate for the Washington House of Representatives in the 47th legislative district, position 1, and Bruce Guthrie in the 21st legislative district, position 2.

Clark finished second in the August 4 primary with 8,361 votes (29.87%), behind incumbent Debra Entenman, who received 10,619 votes (37.94%). Guthrie also advanced to the general election, against incumbent Lillian Ortiz-Self.

== Organization and leadership ==
The party is governed by bylaws and a State Executive Committee. Its bylaws provide for a chair, vice chair, secretary, treasurer, and representatives elected from the party membership, as well as an annual state convention.

=== State Executive Committee ===
As of October 2026, the party lists the following committee members, with terms expiring at its 2027 convention:

State Executive Committee, October 2026
Position	Name
Chair	C. Michael Pickens
Vice chair	Toni Kelley
Secretary	Kenton Gartrell
Treasurer	J. Data Logan
At-large member	James Holcomb
At-large member	Robert McGee
At-large member	Sam Sheehan
At-large member	Nehemiah Västinsalo

== Elected / Appointed Officials ==
Elected and Appointed Officials identified as Libertarian Party Members
Title	Name	Location	Partisan / Non-Partisan
Port Commissioner	Nicholas M. Moore	Port of Ephrata	Non-Partisan
City Council	Don Myers	Moses Lake	Non-Partisan

== County parties ==
- Adams County -
- Asotin County -
- Benton County -
- Chelan County -
- Clallam County -
- Clark County -
- Columbia County -
- Cowlitz County -
- Douglas County -
- Ferry County -
- Franklin County -
- Garfield County -
- Grant -
- Grays Harbor -
- Island County -
- Jefferson County -
- King County - Facebook
- Kitsap County - Facebook
- Kittitas County -
- Klickitat County -
- Lewis County -
- Lincoln County -
- Mason County -
- Okanogan County -
- Pacific County -
- Pend Oreille County -
- Pierce County - Facebook
- San Juan County -
- Skagit County Facebook
- Skamania County
- Snohomish County - Facebook
- Spokane County - Facebook
- Stevens County -
- Thurston County - Facebook
- Wahkiakum County -
- Walla Walla County -
- Whatcom County -
- Whitman County -
- Yakima -

== Detailed electoral performance ==
=== Presidential ===
The following table shows the Libertarian presidential ticket’s results in Washington. Changes are in percentage points compared with the preceding presidential election, using the displayed rounded percentages. Positions are among named tickets and exclude aggregated write-in totals.

Election year	Vote share	Change (percentage points)	Votes	Presidential candidate	Vice-presidential candidate	Position	Reference
1972	0.10%	N/A	1,537	John Hospers	Tonie Nathan	5th	
1976	0.32%	+0.22	5,042	Roger MacBride	David Bergland	6th	
1980	1.68%	+1.36	29,213	Ed Clark	David Koch	4th	
1984	0.47%	−1.21	8,844	David Bergland	James A. Lewis	3rd	
1988	0.92%	+0.45	17,240	Ron Paul	Andre Marrou	3rd	
1992	0.33%	−0.59	7,533	Andre Marrou	Nancy Lord	4th	
1996	0.56%	+0.23	12,522	Harry Browne	Jo Jorgensen	5th	
2000	0.53%	−0.03	13,135	Harry Browne	Art Olivier	4th	
2004	0.42%	−0.11	11,955	Michael Badnarik	Richard Campagna	4th	
2008	0.42%	0.00	12,728	Bob Barr	Wayne Allyn Root	4th	
2012	1.35%	+0.93	42,202	Gary Johnson	Jim Gray	3rd	
2016	4.85%	+3.50	160,879	Gary Johnson	Bill Weld	3rd	
2020	1.97%	−2.88	80,500	Jo Jorgensen	Spike Cohen	3rd	
2024	0.42%	−1.55	16,428	Chase Oliver	Mike ter Maat	5th	
