= Roger MacBride 1976 presidential campaign =

American political campaign

- Campaign: 1976 United States presidential election
- Candidate: Roger MacBride; Member of the Vermont House of Representatives (1963 – 1965); David Bergland
- Affiliation: Libertarian Party
- Status: Lost election: November 2, 1976
- Key people: Ed Crane (campaign manager)
- Slogan: I'm for Roger!

The 1976 presidential campaign of Roger MacBride, a former member of the Vermont House of Representatives and faithless elector in the 1972 presidential election, was launched to seek the Libertarian Party nomination for the presidency of the United States in the 1976 presidential election.

After obtaining the Libertarian presidential nomination on August 31, 1975, MacBride focused on building up the party's ballot access and state affiliates and despite losing the election on November 2, 1976, saw an 168,883 vote and 0.21% increase from John Hospers` 1972 campaign. His campaign also saw an increase in ballot access from Hosper`s two on-ballot and four write-in states to thirty three on-ballot and seven write-in states.

== Campaign ==
Before announcing his candidacy MacBride was given a dinner in his honor by the Libertarian Party of New Jersey after its state convention and later spoke at a banquet hosted by the Arizona affiliate.

On August 31, 1975 delegates from thirty eights states gave MacBride the Libertarian presidential nomination. After winning the Libertarian nomination MacBride tried to choose a vice president, but all of his choices could not get a majority until David Bergland came and according to him won the nomination since his "most important qualification was being over 35. Not many delegates attending were that old in 1975." Roger believed that the damage done to the Republican party following its 1976 primaries, the collapse of the American Independent Party and Eugene McCarthy`s poorly ran campaign could allow him to do well and receive many votes from disillusioned voters. MacBride primarily focused on the western United States stating that "Early Americans ... struggling for survival in a hard wilderness ... grasped somehow that they were free, that no authority controlled them ... That truth released a burst of creative human energy such as the planet had never known, and created the modern world."

MacBride criticized Secretary of the Treasury William E. Simon for refusing to give him secret service protection that is usually given to Democratic and Republican candidates. In October he appeared on Meet the Press along with other third-party candidates such as with Tom Anderson, Peter Camejo, Lyndon LaRouche.

== Endorsements ==
List of political endorsements

Organizations

Notable individuals

Newspapers

- Reason, libertarian monthly magazine
