= 1972 United States presidential election in Virginia =

- November 7, 1972

Nominee	Richard Nixon	George McGovern
Party	Republican	Democratic
Home state	California	South Dakota
Running mate	Spiro Agnew	Sargent Shriver
Electoral vote	11 (Note: A faithless Republican elector voted for the Libertarian ticket: Hospers–Nathan)	0
Popular vote	988,493	438,887
Percentage	67.84%	30.12%
County and independent city results
Nixon
50–60%
60–70%
70–80%
80–90%
McGovern
60–70%
President before election
Richard Nixon
Republican
Elected President
Richard Nixon
Republican

The 1972 United States presidential election in Virginia took place on November 7, 1972. All 50 states and the District of Columbia were part of the 1972 United States presidential election. Virginia voters chose 12 electors to the Electoral College, which selected the president and vice president of the United States. This was also the first presidential election after the passage of the Twenty-sixth Amendment, which decreased the voting age from 21 to 18.

For over sixty years Virginia had had the most restricted electorate in the United States due to a cumulative poll tax and literacy tests. Virginia would be almost entirely controlled by the conservative Democratic Byrd Organization for four of those decades, although during the Organization's last twenty years of controlling the state it would direct many Virginia voters away from the national Democratic Party due to opposition to black civil rights and to the fiscal liberalism of the New Deal. After the Twenty-Fourth Amendment and Harper v. Virginia State Board of Elections the state's electorate would substantially expand as the burden of poll taxes on the lower classes was removed. Contemporaneously the postwar Republican trend of the Northeast-aligned Washington D.C. suburbs, which had begun as early as 1944, would accelerate and become intensified by the mobilisation of working-class Piedmont whites against a national Democratic Party strongly associated with black interests.

After 1966 the statewide Democratic party was severely divided into conservative, moderate and liberal factions, so that in addition to voting Republican in four of five presidential elections, Virginia's Congressional delegation would gain a Republican majority as early as the 91st Congress, and Linwood Holton would become the first Republican governor since the 1880s Readjuster fusion. However, it was 1970 before significant GOP gains occurred in the state legislature, and it was generally acknowledged that President Nixon offered no support to down-ballot Republican candidates.

== Campaign ==
Neither incumbent United States President Richard Nixon nor South Dakota Senator George McGovern of the Democratic Party campaigned in the state, which all polls had conceded to Nixon from the beginning of August.

Among white voters, 78% supported Nixon while 22% supported McGovern.

=== Predictions ===
Source	Ranking	As of
The Daily Press	Solid R	August 9, 1972
Greensboro Daily News	Certain R	October 8, 1972
The Miami Herald	Certain R	October 16, 1972
Boston Sunday Globe	Certain R	October 22, 1972
Evening Express	Certain R	October 30, 1972
The York Dispatch	Safe R	November 6, 1972

== Analysis ==
Virginia was won by Nixon with a landslide 67.84 percent of the vote. Nixon also won the national election with 60.67 percent of the vote.

In strict accordance with national trends, McGovern carried just one county or independent city in Virginia — however, that jurisdiction, Charles City County, saw McGovern receive over 67 percent of the vote, and was his fourth-strongest county in the country. As of the 2024, this constitutes the last occasion the Republican Party has carried Brunswick County, Greensville County, Sussex County, and the cities of Charlottesville, Norfolk, Petersburg, Portsmouth and Richmond.

However, Nixon did not win all of the electoral votes in Virginia because one of his pledged electors, Roger MacBride, instead cast his vote for Libertarian candidate John Hospers and his running mate, Tonie Nathan. Although Hospers was not on the ballot in Virginia, MacBride's vote was the first electoral vote ever cast for a female candidate (Nathan); MacBride was subsequently nominated as the Libertarian candidate for President in the next election.

== Results ==
1972 United States presidential election in Virginia
Party	Candidate	Votes	Percentage	Electoral votes
Republican	Richard Nixon (inc.)	988,493	67.84%	11
Libertarian	John Hospers	0	0.00%	1
Democratic	George McGovern	438,887	30.12%	0
American Independent	John G. Schmitz	19,721	1.35%	0
Socialist Labor	Louis Fisher	9,918	0.68%	0
Totals		1,457,019	100.00%	12

=== Results by county or independent city ===
County or city	Richard Nixon Republican		George McGovern Democratic		John G. Schmitz American Independent		Louis Fisher Socialist Labor		Margin		Total votes cast
County or city	#	%	#	%	#	%	#	%	#	%	Total votes cast
Accomack	6,496	71.97%	2,406	26.66%	108	1.20%	16	0.18%	4,090	45.31%	9,026
Albemarle	8,447	65.22%	4,303	33.23%	139	1.07%	62	0.48%	4,144	31.99%	12,951
Alexandria	20,235	55.95%	15,409	42.60%	348	0.96%	177	0.49%	4,826	13.35%	36,169
Alleghany	2,584	67.47%	1,069	27.91%	170	4.44%	7	0.18%	1,515	39.56%	3,830
Amelia	1,606	64.99%	778	31.49%	58	2.35%	29	1.17%	828	33.50%	2,471
Amherst	4,909	73.94%	1,512	22.77%	148	2.23%	70	1.05%	3,397	51.17%	6,639
Appomattox	2,788	78.20%	684	19.19%	68	1.91%	25	0.70%	2,104	59.01%	3,565
Arlington	39,406	59.36%	25,877	38.98%	830	1.25%	270	0.41%	13,529	20.38%	66,383
Augusta	9,106	81.44%	1,766	15.79%	148	1.32%	161	1.44%	7,340	65.65%	11,181
Bath	1,127	68.89%	462	28.24%	43	2.63%	4	0.24%	665	40.65%	1,636
Bedford	5,286	73.43%	1,501	20.85%	358	4.97%	54	0.75%	3,785	52.58%	7,199
Bedford City	1,407	68.20%	529	25.64%	89	4.31%	38	1.84%	878	42.56%	2,063
Bland	1,352	70.64%	527	27.53%	31	1.62%	4	0.21%	825	43.11%	1,914
Botetourt	3,806	69.44%	1,519	27.71%	121	2.21%	35	0.64%	2,287	41.73%	5,481
Bristol	2,665	68.46%	1,157	29.72%	54	1.39%	17	0.44%	1,508	38.74%	3,893
Brunswick	3,072	58.17%	2,130	40.33%	63	1.19%	16	0.30%	942	17.84%	5,281
Buchanan	4,801	56.13%	3,566	41.69%	95	1.11%	92	1.08%	1,235	14.44%	8,554
Buckingham	2,107	62.86%	1,186	35.38%	44	1.31%	15	0.45%	921	27.48%	3,352
Buena Vista	990	70.26%	373	26.47%	22	1.55%	34	2.40%	617	43.79%	1,409
Campbell	11,676	82.48%	2,055	14.52%	288	2.03%	138	0.97%	9,621	67.96%	14,157
Caroline	2,086	52.80%	1,814	45.91%	32	0.81%	19	0.48%	272	6.89%	3,951
Carroll	5,247	75.08%	1,583	22.65%	90	1.29%	69	0.99%	3,664	52.43%	6,989
Charles City	535	30.84%	1,177	67.84%	14	0.81%	9	0.52%	-642	-37.00%	1,735
Charlotte	2,501	66.22%	1,182	31.29%	75	1.99%	19	0.50%	1,319	34.93%	3,777
Charlottesville	7,935	59.42%	5,240	39.24%	95	0.71%	83	0.62%	2,695	20.18%	13,353
Chesapeake	17,722	67.95%	7,289	27.95%	649	2.49%	420	1.61%	10,433	40.00%	26,080
Chesterfield	24,934	85.24%	3,823	13.07%	365	1.25%	131	0.45%	21,111	72.17%	29,253
Clarke	1,816	69.13%	715	27.22%	67	2.55%	29	1.10%	1,101	41.91%	2,627
Clifton Forge	1,127	63.17%	575	32.23%	68	3.81%	14	0.78%	552	30.94%	1,784
Colonial Heights	5,304	87.99%	541	8.97%	87	1.44%	96	1.59%	4,763	79.02%	6,028
Covington	1,910	63.71%	948	31.62%	113	3.77%	27	0.90%	962	32.09%	2,998
Craig	774	63.44%	425	34.84%	19	1.56%	2	0.16%	349	28.60%	1,220
Culpeper	3,707	72.80%	1,316	25.84%	60	1.18%	9	0.18%	2,391	46.96%	5,092
Cumberland	1,371	57.75%	969	40.82%	22	0.93%	12	0.51%	402	16.93%	2,374
Danville	12,463	73.68%	4,148	24.52%	134	0.79%	171	1.01%	8,315	49.16%	16,916
Dickenson	3,633	56.22%	2,711	41.95%	62	0.96%	56	0.87%	922	14.27%	6,462
Dinwiddie	3,314	62.47%	1,901	35.83%	74	1.39%	16	0.30%	1,413	26.64%	5,305
Emporia	1,340	68.82%	565	29.02%	18	0.92%	24	1.23%	775	39.80%	1,947
Essex	1,482	62.58%	808	34.12%	44	1.86%	34	1.44%	674	28.46%	2,368
Fairfax	112,135	66.26%	54,844	32.40%	1,764	1.04%	503	0.30%	57,291	33.86%	169,246
Fairfax City	5,063	67.73%	2,274	30.42%	118	1.58%	20	0.27%	2,789	37.31%	7,475
Falls Church	2,967	60.02%	1,895	38.34%	67	1.36%	14	0.28%	1,072	21.68%	4,943
Fauquier	4,654	67.71%	2,039	29.67%	80	1.16%	100	1.45%	2,615	38.04%	6,873
Floyd	2,444	76.11%	708	22.05%	57	1.78%	2	0.06%	1,736	54.06%	3,211
Fluvanna	1,438	67.29%	637	29.81%	23	1.08%	39	1.82%	801	37.48%	2,137
Franklin	4,674	65.74%	2,273	31.97%	145	2.04%	18	0.25%	2,401	33.77%	7,110
Franklin City	1,416	64.98%	738	33.87%	14	0.64%	11	0.50%	678	31.11%	2,179
Frederick	5,367	75.18%	1,604	22.47%	105	1.47%	63	0.88%	3,763	52.71%	7,139
Fredericksburg	3,211	64.53%	1,702	34.20%	34	0.68%	29	0.58%	1,509	30.33%	4,976
Galax	1,497	72.63%	524	25.42%	28	1.36%	12	0.58%	973	47.21%	2,061
Giles	3,671	64.34%	1,869	32.75%	78	1.37%	88	1.54%	1,802	31.59%	5,706
Gloucester	3,642	71.92%	1,292	25.51%	78	1.54%	52	1.03%	2,350	46.41%	5,064
Goochland	2,127	60.98%	1,254	35.95%	52	1.49%	55	1.58%	873	25.03%	3,488
Grayson	3,565	67.48%	1,603	30.34%	67	1.27%	48	0.91%	1,962	37.14%	5,283
Greene	1,208	78.24%	318	20.60%	15	0.97%	3	0.19%	890	57.64%	1,544
Greensville	1,608	56.05%	1,197	41.72%	46	1.60%	18	0.63%	411	14.33%	2,869
Halifax	5,469	68.71%	2,384	29.95%	77	0.97%	29	0.36%	3,085	38.76%	7,959
Hampton	21,897	65.49%	10,648	31.85%	479	1.43%	411	1.23%	11,249	33.64%	33,435
Hanover	11,095	81.20%	2,200	16.10%	237	1.73%	131	0.96%	8,895	65.10%	13,663
Harrisonburg	3,626	77.26%	992	21.14%	39	0.83%	36	0.77%	2,634	56.12%	4,693
Henrico	52,536	84.87%	8,420	13.60%	571	0.92%	377	0.61%	44,116	71.27%	61,904
Henry	7,556	62.84%	4,042	33.62%	170	1.41%	256	2.13%	3,514	29.22%	12,024
Highland	774	77.63%	206	20.66%	12	1.20%	5	0.50%	568	56.97%	997
Hopewell	5,229	75.88%	1,485	21.55%	106	1.54%	71	1.03%	3,744	54.33%	6,891
Isle of Wight	3,555	59.27%	2,305	38.43%	119	1.98%	19	0.32%	1,250	20.84%	5,998
James City	3,372	61.97%	1,992	36.61%	56	1.03%	21	0.39%	1,380	25.36%	5,441
King and Queen	1,033	58.30%	708	39.95%	10	0.56%	21	1.19%	325	18.35%	1,772
King George	1,675	70.05%	658	27.52%	34	1.42%	24	1.00%	1,017	42.53%	2,391
King William	1,839	69.14%	797	29.96%	18	0.68%	6	0.23%	1,042	39.18%	2,660
Lancaster	2,683	71.64%	1,009	26.94%	35	0.93%	18	0.48%	1,674	44.70%	3,745
Lee	4,957	62.39%	2,825	35.56%	68	0.86%	95	1.20%	2,132	26.83%	7,945
Lexington	1,345	64.98%	695	33.57%	18	0.87%	12	0.58%	650	31.41%	2,070
Loudoun	9,417	69.46%	3,941	29.07%	190	1.40%	9	0.07%	5,476	40.39%	13,557
Louisa	2,545	63.55%	1,338	33.41%	56	1.40%	66	1.65%	1,207	30.14%	4,005
Lunenburg	2,464	69.14%	1,044	29.29%	45	1.26%	11	0.31%	1,420	39.85%	3,564
Lynchburg	13,259	74.11%	4,208	23.52%	264	1.48%	159	0.89%	9,051	50.59%	17,890
Madison	1,864	73.41%	639	25.17%	24	0.95%	12	0.47%	1,225	48.24%	2,539
Martinsville	3,879	61.32%	2,292	36.23%	39	0.62%	116	1.83%	1,587	25.09%	6,326
Mathews	2,164	72.45%	730	24.44%	51	1.71%	42	1.41%	1,434	48.01%	2,987
Mecklenburg	6,381	68.55%	2,804	30.12%	106	1.14%	18	0.19%	3,577	38.43%	9,309
Middlesex	1,697	69.29%	724	29.56%	24	0.98%	4	0.16%	973	39.73%	2,449
Montgomery	9,348	70.56%	3,692	27.87%	194	1.46%	14	0.11%	5,656	42.69%	13,248
Nansemond	5,767	57.57%	3,929	39.42%	186	1.87%	84	0.84%	1,838	18.45%	9,966
Nelson	2,145	67.22%	954	29.90%	82	2.57%	10	0.31%	1,191	37.32%	3,191
New Kent	1,370	67.52%	633	31.20%	19	0.94%	7	0.34%	737	36.32%	2,029
Newport News	27,169	67.40%	12,233	30.35%	639	1.59%	271	0.67%	14,936	37.05%	40,312
Norfolk	38,385	57.97%	25,737	38.87%	1,198	1.81%	897	1.35%	12,648	19.10%	66,217
Northampton	2,587	66.45%	1,246	32.01%	53	1.36%	7	0.18%	1,341	34.44%	3,893
Northumberland	2,332	71.58%	884	27.13%	28	0.86%	14	0.43%	1,448	44.45%	3,258
Norton	823	62.68%	463	35.26%	12	0.91%	15	1.14%	360	27.42%	1,313
Nottoway	2,979	68.22%	1,308	29.95%	70	1.60%	10	0.23%	1,671	38.27%	4,367
Orange	2,758	71.28%	1,032	26.67%	42	1.09%	37	0.96%	1,726	44.61%	3,869
Page	4,326	72.34%	1,585	26.51%	61	1.02%	8	0.13%	2,741	45.83%	5,980
Patrick	2,951	73.35%	942	23.42%	100	2.49%	30	0.75%	2,009	49.93%	4,023
Petersburg	6,710	55.67%	5,156	42.78%	131	1.09%	56	0.46%	1,554	12.89%	12,053
Pittsylvania	12,108	72.34%	4,429	26.46%	174	1.04%	26	0.16%	7,679	45.88%	16,737
Portsmouth	20,090	58.49%	13,124	38.21%	760	2.21%	376	1.09%	6,966	20.28%	34,350
Powhatan	1,751	66.43%	810	30.73%	60	2.28%	15	0.57%	941	35.70%	2,636
Prince Edward	3,199	65.96%	1,585	32.68%	51	1.05%	15	0.31%	1,614	33.28%	4,850
Prince George	2,405	67.71%	1,084	30.52%	46	1.30%	17	0.48%	1,321	37.19%	3,552
Prince William	20,149	72.26%	7,266	26.06%	351	1.26%	118	0.42%	12,883	46.20%	27,884
Pulaski	6,281	72.01%	2,311	26.50%	114	1.31%	16	0.18%	3,970	45.51%	8,722
Radford	2,577	68.68%	1,121	29.88%	40	1.07%	14	0.37%	1,456	38.80%	3,752
Rappahannock	1,055	68.20%	471	30.45%	16	1.03%	5	0.32%	584	37.75%	1,547
Richmond	1,565	77.55%	435	21.56%	13	0.64%	5	0.25%	1,130	55.99%	2,018
Richmond City	46,244	57.59%	33,055	41.16%	649	0.81%	354	0.44%	13,189	16.43%	80,302
Roanoke	19,920	77.28%	5,318	20.63%	474	1.84%	66	0.26%	14,602	56.65%	25,778
Roanoke City	18,541	64.67%	9,498	33.13%	537	1.87%	95	0.33%	9,043	31.54%	28,671
Rockbridge	3,009	74.28%	956	23.60%	62	1.53%	24	0.59%	2,053	50.68%	4,051
Rockingham	10,025	81.67%	2,026	16.51%	143	1.16%	81	0.66%	7,999	65.16%	12,275
Russell	5,010	58.93%	3,367	39.60%	71	0.84%	54	0.64%	1,643	19.33%	8,502
Salem	5,649	74.79%	1,744	23.09%	136	1.80%	24	0.32%	3,905	51.70%	7,553
Scott	5,125	66.18%	2,474	31.95%	81	1.05%	64	0.83%	2,651	34.23%	7,744
Shenandoah	7,128	82.46%	1,422	16.45%	78	0.90%	16	0.19%	5,706	66.01%	8,644
Smyth	6,409	72.27%	2,280	25.71%	82	0.92%	97	1.09%	4,129	46.56%	8,868
South Boston	1,865	71.59%	709	27.22%	7	0.27%	24	0.92%	1,156	44.37%	2,605
Southampton	3,225	67.09%	1,498	31.16%	66	1.37%	18	0.37%	1,727	35.93%	4,807
Spotsylvania	3,577	65.73%	1,775	32.62%	75	1.38%	15	0.28%	1,802	33.11%	5,442
Stafford	5,222	72.39%	1,901	26.35%	83	1.15%	8	0.11%	3,321	46.04%	7,214
Staunton	5,531	78.25%	1,416	20.03%	33	0.47%	88	1.25%	4,115	58.22%	7,068
Suffolk	2,137	69.54%	898	29.22%	29	0.94%	9	0.29%	1,239	40.32%	3,073
Surry	1,067	50.40%	988	46.67%	27	1.28%	35	1.65%	79	3.73%	2,117
Sussex	2,120	54.99%	1,645	42.67%	43	1.12%	47	1.22%	475	12.32%	3,855
Tazewell	7,233	67.81%	3,181	29.82%	107	1.00%	146	1.37%	4,052	37.99%	10,667
Virginia Beach	38,074	76.56%	10,373	20.86%	837	1.68%	449	0.90%	27,701	55.70%	49,733
Warren	3,718	69.40%	1,508	28.15%	63	1.18%	68	1.27%	2,210	41.25%	5,357
Washington	8,805	72.70%	3,028	25.00%	123	1.02%	155	1.28%	5,777	47.70%	12,111
Waynesboro	4,163	77.75%	1,061	19.82%	72	1.34%	58	1.08%	3,102	57.93%	5,354
Westmoreland	2,331	66.00%	1,113	31.51%	27	0.76%	61	1.73%	1,218	34.49%	3,532
Williamsburg	1,786	57.46%	1,274	40.99%	29	0.93%	19	0.61%	512	16.47%	3,108
Winchester	4,647	75.55%	1,418	23.05%	55	0.89%	31	0.50%	3,229	52.50%	6,151
Wise	6,739	59.94%	4,402	39.16%	79	0.70%	22	0.20%	2,337	20.78%	11,242
Wythe	4,553	73.96%	1,431	23.25%	70	1.14%	102	1.66%	3,122	50.71%	6,156
York	7,745	74.90%	2,302	22.26%	211	2.04%	83	0.80%	5,443	52.64%	10,341
Totals	988,493	67.84%	438,887	30.12%	19,721	1.35%	9,918	0.68%	549,606	37.72%	1,457,019

=== By congressional district ===
Nixon won all 10 congressional districts, including three held by Democrats.

District	Nixon	McGovern
1st	67.4%	30.4%
2nd	65.8%	31.3%
3rd	71.5%	27.1%
4th	63.5%	33.6%
5th	70.7%	29.3%
6th	72.7%	24.6%
7th	71%	27.1%
8th	66.3%	32.3%
9th	66.9%	31.3%
10th	63%	35.5%

== Works cited ==
- Black, Earl; Black, Merle (1992). The Vital South: How Presidents Are Elected. Harvard University Press. ISBN 0674941306.
