= 1984 United States presidential election in Indiana =

- November 6, 1984
- Turnout: 59.9% ▲2.2 pp

Nominee	Ronald Reagan	Walter Mondale
Party	Republican	Democratic
Home state	California	Minnesota
Running mate	George H. W. Bush	Geraldine Ferraro
Electoral vote	12	0
Popular vote	1,377,230	841,481
Percentage	61.67%	37.68%
County results
Reagan
40–50%
50–60%
60–70%
70–80%
80–90%
Mondale
50–60%
President before election
Ronald Reagan
Republican
Elected President
Ronald Reagan
Republican

A presidential election was held in Indiana on November 6, 1984, as part of the 1984 United States presidential election. The Republican ticket of the incumbent president of the United States Ronald Reagan and the vice president of the United States George H. W. Bush defeated the Democratic ticket of the former vice president Walter Mondale and the U.S. representative from New York's 9th congressional district Geraldine Ferraro. Reagan defeated Mondale in the national election with 525 electoral votes.

== Primary elections ==
=== Republican Party ===
Indiana Republican primary, May 8, 1984
Party	Candidate	Votes	%
Republican	Ronald Reagan	428,559	100.00
Total votes		428,559	100.00

=== Democratic Party ===
Indiana Democratic primary, May 8, 1984
Party	Candidate	Votes	%
Democratic	Gary Hart	299,491	41.77
Democratic	Walter Mondale	293,413	40.92
Democratic	Jesse Jackson	98,190	13.70
Democratic	John Glenn (withdrawn)	16,046	2.24
Democratic	Bob Brewster	9,815	1.37
Total votes		716,955	100.00

== General election ==
=== Statistics ===
Reagan carried every Indiana county except for Lake County in the northwest corner of the state. Reagan's victory marked the fifth consecutive presidential election in which the Republican ticket carried the state. As of 2024, this is the most recent presidential election in Indiana in which the winner polled over 60 percent of the popular vote.

=== Results ===
1984 United States presidential election in Indiana
Party	Candidate	Votes	%	±%
Republican	Ronald Reagan George H. W. Bush	1,377,230	61.67	▲5.66
Democratic	Walter Mondale Geraldine Ferarro	841,481	37.68	▲0.03
American	Delmar Dennis Traves Brownlee	7,617	0.34	▲0.13
Libertarian	David Bergland Jim Lewis	6,741	0.30	▼0.58
Total votes		2,233,069	100.00	

=== Results by county ===
1984 United States presidential election in Indiana by county
County	Ronald Reagan Republican		Walter Mondale Democratic		Delmar Dennis American		David Bergland Libertarian		Margin		Total
County	Votes	%	Votes	%	Votes	%	Votes	%	Votes	%	Total
Adams	7,958	66.58%	3,923	32.82%	47	0.39%	24	0.20%	4,035	33.76%	11,952
Allen	75,505	65.67%	38,462	33.45%	709	0.62%	299	0.26%	37,043	32.22%	114,975
Bartholomew	18,704	69.35%	8,075	29.94%	93	0.34%	98	0.36%	10,629	39.41%	26,970
Benton	3,281	70.38%	1,357	29.11%	6	0.13%	18	0.39%	1,924	41.27%	4,662
Blackford	3,787	60.79%	2,395	38.44%	34	0.55%	14	0.22%	1,392	22.35%	6,230
Boone	11,790	74.38%	3,982	25.12%	30	0.19%	48	0.30%	7,808	49.26%	15,850
Brown	3,517	56.74%	2,657	42.87%	5	0.08%	19	0.31%	860	13.87%	6,198
Carroll	5,528	66.09%	2,774	33.17%	27	0.32%	35	0.42%	2,754	32.92%	8,364
Cass	12,355	68.75%	5,521	30.72%	66	0.37%	29	0.16%	6,834	38.03%	17,971
Clark	19,419	57.48%	14,138	41.85%	180	0.53%	48	0.14%	5,281	15.63%	33,785
Clay	6,957	64.87%	3,707	34.56%	29	0.27%	32	0.30%	3,250	30.31%	10,725
Clinton	8,969	67.12%	4,329	32.40%	32	0.24%	33	0.25%	4,640	34.72%	13,363
Crawford	2,633	53.63%	2,256	45.95%	15	0.31%	6	0.12%	377	7.68%	4,910
Daviess	7,721	68.26%	3,545	31.34%	20	0.18%	25	0.22%	4,176	36.92%	11,311
Dearborn	9,149	64.74%	4,920	34.81%	49	0.35%	14	0.10%	4,229	29.93%	14,132
Decatur	6,551	69.97%	2,766	29.54%	25	0.27%	21	0.22%	3,785	40.43%	9,363
DeKalb	8,769	64.82%	4,617	34.13%	108	0.80%	34	0.25%	4,152	30.69%	13,528
Delaware	30,092	59.98%	19,791	39.45%	126	0.25%	162	0.32%	10,301	20.53%	50,171
Dubois	9,391	62.77%	5,423	36.25%	126	0.84%	22	0.15%	3,968	26.52%	14,962
Elkhart	34,621	71.98%	13,240	27.53%	103	0.21%	133	0.28%	21,381	44.45%	48,097
Fayette	7,142	62.95%	4,122	36.33%	44	0.39%	38	0.33%	3,020	26.62%	11,346
Floyd	15,466	58.85%	10,616	40.40%	159	0.61%	38	0.14%	4,850	18.45%	26,279
Fountain	5,450	64.90%	2,897	34.50%	31	0.37%	19	0.23%	2,553	30.40%	8,397
Franklin	5,202	69.62%	2,225	29.78%	22	0.29%	23	0.31%	2,977	39.84%	7,472
Fulton	6,057	70.14%	2,527	29.26%	27	0.31%	24	0.28%	3,530	40.88%	8,635
Gibson	8,618	54.62%	7,082	44.89%	49	0.31%	28	0.18%	1,536	9.73%	15,777
Grant	20,482	66.78%	9,986	32.56%	146	0.48%	59	0.19%	10,496	34.22%	30,673
Greene	8,438	60.71%	5,267	37.90%	163	1.17%	30	0.22%	3,171	22.81%	13,898
Hamilton	30,254	82.30%	6,364	17.31%	36	0.10%	107	0.29%	23,890	64.99%	36,761
Hancock	12,880	73.58%	4,550	25.99%	27	0.15%	47	0.27%	8,330	47.59%	17,504
Harrison	7,255	60.61%	4,634	38.72%	53	0.44%	27	0.23%	2,621	21.89%	11,969
Hendricks	21,307	75.73%	6,659	23.67%	82	0.29%	87	0.31%	14,648	52.06%	28,135
Henry	11,926	62.56%	7,064	37.06%	39	0.20%	33	0.17%	4,862	25.50%	19,062
Howard	22,386	67.74%	10,458	31.65%	109	0.33%	93	0.28%	11,928	36.09%	33,046
Huntington	10,805	69.77%	4,598	29.69%	50	0.32%	34	0.22%	6,207	40.08%	15,487
Jackson	9,879	64.85%	5,163	33.89%	158	1.04%	34	0.22%	4,716	30.96%	15,234
Jasper	6,537	69.22%	2,821	29.87%	55	0.58%	31	0.33%	3,716	39.35%	9,444
Jay	5,975	64.90%	3,174	34.47%	32	0.35%	26	0.28%	2,801	30.43%	9,207
Jefferson	7,482	59.20%	4,952	39.18%	178	1.41%	27	0.21%	2,530	20.02%	12,639
Jennings	6,356	65.48%	3,264	33.63%	61	0.63%	26	0.27%	3,092	31.85%	9,707
Johnson	23,482	74.86%	7,715	24.60%	83	0.26%	88	0.28%	15,767	50.26%	31,368
Knox	10,872	62.27%	6,417	36.75%	134	0.77%	36	0.21%	4,455	25.52%	17,459
Kosciusko	17,560	77.88%	4,877	21.63%	48	0.21%	62	0.27%	12,683	56.25%	22,547
LaGrange	4,772	71.31%	1,884	28.15%	20	0.30%	16	0.24%	2,888	43.16%	6,692
Lake	94,870	44.30%	117,984	55.10%	805	0.38%	484	0.23%	-23,114	-10.80%	214,143
LaPorte	23,346	59.00%	15,904	40.20%	124	0.31%	193	0.49%	7,442	18.80%	39,567
Lawrence	11,440	66.71%	5,608	32.70%	73	0.43%	29	0.17%	5,832	34.01%	17,150
Madison	36,510	61.87%	22,254	37.71%	122	0.21%	128	0.22%	14,256	24.16%	59,014
Marion	184,880	58.29%	130,185	41.05%	693	0.22%	1,390	0.44%	54,695	17.24%	317,148
Marshall	11,100	68.76%	4,931	30.54%	61	0.38%	52	0.32%	6,169	38.22%	16,144
Martin	3,363	63.07%	1,937	36.33%	15	0.28%	17	0.32%	1,426	26.74%	5,332
Miami	9,551	68.75%	4,224	30.41%	88	0.63%	29	0.21%	5,327	38.34%	13,892
Monroe	21,772	59.12%	14,719	39.97%	121	0.33%	214	0.58%	7,053	19.15%	36,826
Montgomery	11,119	74.96%	3,626	24.44%	39	0.26%	50	0.34%	7,493	50.52%	14,834
Morgan	14,884	75.91%	4,627	23.60%	47	0.24%	49	0.25%	10,257	52.31%	19,607
Newton	3,560	68.54%	1,596	30.73%	17	0.33%	21	0.40%	1,964	37.81%	5,194
Noble	8,459	65.74%	4,237	32.93%	99	0.77%	72	0.56%	4,222	32.81%	12,867
Ohio	1,503	58.32%	1,068	41.44%	2	0.08%	4	0.16%	435	16.88%	2,577
Orange	5,909	69.40%	2,571	30.19%	16	0.19%	19	0.22%	3,338	39.21%	8,515
Owen	4,204	66.49%	2,082	32.93%	20	0.32%	17	0.27%	2,122	33.56%	6,323
Parke	5,052	69.26%	2,205	30.23%	16	0.22%	21	0.29%	2,847	39.03%	7,294
Perry	4,785	49.91%	4,760	49.65%	22	0.23%	21	0.22%	25	0.26%	9,588
Pike	3,689	52.98%	3,231	46.40%	25	0.36%	18	0.26%	458	6.58%	6,963
Porter	32,505	64.14%	17,862	35.24%	125	0.25%	190	0.37%	14,643	28.90%	50,682
Posey	6,472	59.07%	4,452	40.63%	16	0.15%	17	0.16%	2,020	18.44%	10,957
Pulaski	4,167	66.93%	2,008	32.25%	36	0.58%	15	0.24%	2,159	34.68%	6,226
Putnam	7,820	69.38%	3,392	30.09%	30	0.27%	30	0.27%	4,428	39.29%	11,272
Randolph	7,793	66.77%	3,805	32.60%	37	0.32%	36	0.31%	3,988	34.17%	11,671
Ripley	7,143	67.99%	3,336	31.75%	15	0.14%	12	0.11%	3,807	36.24%	10,506
Rush	5,429	69.86%	2,307	29.69%	18	0.23%	17	0.22%	3,122	40.17%	7,771
Scott	4,110	54.16%	3,460	45.60%	9	0.12%	9	0.12%	650	8.56%	7,588
Shelby	11,056	66.92%	5,357	32.42%	58	0.35%	51	0.31%	5,699	34.50%	16,522
Spencer	5,816	59.07%	4,005	40.68%	11	0.11%	14	0.14%	1,811	18.39%	9,846
St. Joseph	54,404	53.08%	47,513	46.36%	288	0.28%	288	0.28%	6,891	6.72%	102,493
Starke	5,104	57.42%	3,674	41.33%	86	0.97%	25	0.28%	1,430	16.09%	8,889
Steuben	6,424	72.01%	2,441	27.36%	23	0.26%	33	0.37%	3,983	44.65%	8,921
Sullivan	4,771	54.14%	4,006	45.46%	17	0.19%	19	0.22%	765	8.68%	8,813
Switzerland	1,857	55.48%	1,484	44.34%	2	0.06%	4	0.12%	373	11.14%	3,347
Tippecanoe	29,706	64.75%	15,789	34.42%	88	0.19%	293	0.64%	13,917	30.33%	45,876
Tipton	5,687	70.48%	2,328	28.85%	31	0.38%	23	0.29%	3,359	41.63%	8,069
Union	1,970	70.36%	816	29.14%	4	0.14%	10	0.36%	1,154	41.22%	2,800
Vanderburgh	40,994	56.68%	31,049	42.93%	131	0.18%	156	0.22%	9,945	13.75%	72,330
Vermillion	4,428	54.30%	3,666	44.96%	37	0.45%	23	0.28%	762	9.34%	8,154
Vigo	26,259	58.39%	18,429	40.98%	128	0.28%	157	0.35%	7,830	17.41%	44,973
Wabash	9,862	70.30%	4,077	29.06%	44	0.31%	45	0.32%	5,785	41.24%	14,028
Warren	2,525	65.38%	1,309	33.89%	12	0.31%	16	0.41%	1,216	31.49%	3,862
Warrick	10,202	61.32%	6,345	38.14%	44	0.26%	46	0.28%	3,857	23.18%	16,637
Washington	5,874	62.62%	3,334	35.54%	135	1.44%	37	0.39%	2,540	27.08%	9,380
Wayne	18,955	64.80%	10,173	34.78%	52	0.18%	71	0.24%	8,782	30.02%	29,251
Wells	7,579	69.40%	3,274	29.98%	30	0.27%	37	0.34%	4,305	39.42%	10,920
White	7,279	69.33%	3,157	30.07%	28	0.27%	35	0.33%	4,122	39.26%	10,499
Whitley	7,763	67.21%	3,690	31.95%	41	0.35%	57	0.49%	4,073	35.26%	11,551
TOTAL	1,377,230	61.67%	841,481	37.68%	7,617	0.34%	6,741	0.30%	535,749	23.99%	2,233,069

==== Counties that flipped from Democratic to Republican ====
- Perry
- Pike
- Scott
- Switzerland

== See also ==
- United States presidential elections in Indiana

== Bibliography ==
- Congressional Quarterly (2010). Congressional Quarterly's Guide to U.S. Elections (6th ed.). Washington D.C.: Congressional Quarterly.
- Madison, James H. (1986). The Indiana Way: A State History. Bloomington: Indiana University Press.
- Menendez, Albert J. (2009). The Geography of Presidential Elections in the United States, 1868–2004. Jefferson, NC: McFarland and Company.
- McGillivray, Alice V.; Scammon, Richard M. (1994). America at the Polls, 1960–1992: Kennedy to Clinton; A Handbook of American Presidential Election Statistics. Washington, D.C.: Congressional Quarterly.
- Simcox, Edwin J. (1984). 1984 Election Report State of Indiana. Indianapolis: Indiana Secretary of State.
