= Electoral history of Gerald Ford =

Elections featuring President of the US

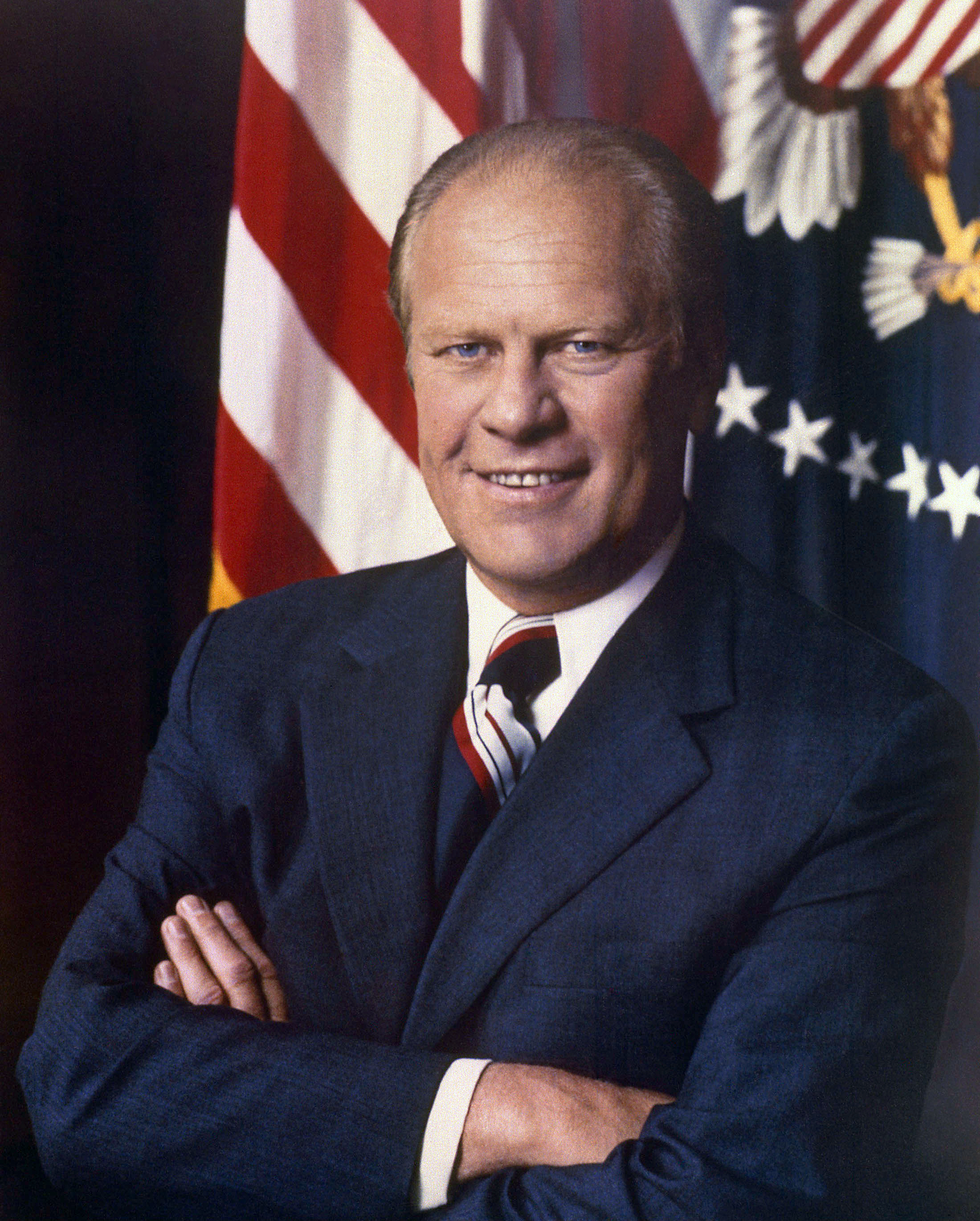
President Gerald R. Ford

Electoral history of Gerald Ford, who served as the 38th president of the United States (1974–1977), the 40th vice president (1973–1974); and as a United States representative from Michigan (1949–1973).

== Congressional elections (1948–1972) ==
=== 1948 ===
Michigan's 5th congressional district Republican primary election, 1948 * denotes incumbent
Party	Candidate	Votes	%
Republican	Gerald Ford	23,632	62.23%
Republican	Bartel J. Jonkman*	14,341	37.77%

Michigan's 5th congressional district election, 1948
Party	Candidate	Votes	%
Republican	Gerald Ford	74,191	60.51%
Democratic	Fred J. Barr, Jr.	46,972	38.31%
Prohibition	William H. Barlette	853	0.70%
Progressive	Theodore Theodore	504	0.41%
Socialist	Eugene Ten Brink, Jr.	93	0.08%

=== 1950 ===
Michigan's 5th congressional district election, 1950 * denotes incumbent
Party	Candidate	Votes	%
Republican	Gerald Ford*	72,829	66.74%
Democratic	James H. McLaughlin	35,927	32.92%
Prohibition	Ella Fruin	376	0.35%

=== 1952 ===
Michigan's 5th congressional district election, 1952 * denotes incumbent
Party	Candidate	Votes	%
Republican	Gerald Ford*	109,807	66.26%
Democratic	Vincent E. O’Neill	55,147	33.28%
Prohibition	Ella Fruin	617	0.37%
Progressive	William Glenn	146	0.09%

=== 1954 ===
Michigan's 5th congressional district election, 1954 * denotes incumbent
Party	Candidate	Votes	%
Republican	Gerald Ford*	81,702	63.26 %
Democratic	Robert S. McAllister	47,453	36.74%

=== 1956 ===
Michigan's 5th congressional district election, 1956 * denotes incumbent
Party	Candidate	Votes	%
Republican	Gerald Ford*	120,349	67.14%
Democratic	George E. Clay	58,899	32.86%

=== 1958 ===
Michigan's 5th congressional district election, 1958 * denotes incumbent
Party	Candidate	Votes	%
Republican	Gerald Ford*	88,156	63.64%
Democratic	Richard Vander Veen	50,203	36.24%
Prohibition	Bernard Elve	156	0.11%

=== 1960 ===
Michigan's 5th congressional district election, 1960 * denotes incumbent
Party	Candidate	Votes	%
Republican	Gerald Ford*	131,461	66.84%
Democratic	William G. Reamon	65,064	33.08%
Prohibition	LeRoy A. Robert	115	0.06%
Socialist Labor	Donald Teets	54	0.03%

=== 1962 ===
Michigan's 5th congressional district election, 1962 * denotes incumbent
Party	Candidate	Votes	%
Republican	Gerald Ford*	110,043	67.04%
Democratic	William G. Reamon	54,112	32.96%

=== 1964 ===
Michigan's 5th congressional district election, 1964 * denotes incumbent
Party	Candidate	Votes	%
Republican	Gerald Ford*	101,810	61.22%
Democratic	William G. Reamon	64,488	38.78%

=== 1966 ===
Michigan's 5th congressional district election, 1966 * denotes incumbent
Party	Candidate	Votes	%
Republican	Gerald Ford*	87,914	68.39%
Democratic	James M. Catchick	40,629	31.61%

=== 1968 ===
Michigan's 5th congressional district election, 1968 * denotes incumbent
Party	Candidate	Votes	%
Republican	Gerald Ford*	105,085	62.75%
Democratic	Lawrence E. Howard	62,219	37.16%
Socialist Labor	Frank Girard	156	0.09%

=== 1970 ===
Michigan's 5th congressional district election, 1970 * denotes incumbent
Party	Candidate	Votes	%
Republican	Gerald Ford*	88,208	61.36%
Democratic	Jean McKee	55,337	38.50%
Socialist Labor	Frank Girard	120	0.08%
Socialist Workers	Walter M. Kus	87	0.06%

=== 1972 ===
Michigan's 5th congressional district election, 1972 * denotes incumbent
Party	Candidate	Votes	%
Republican	Gerald Ford*	118,027	61.08%
Democratic	Jean McKee	72,782	37.67%
American Independent	Dwight W. Johnson	2,045	1.06%
Socialist Labor	Frank Girard	235	0.12%
Communist	Alan Lee Maki	140	0.07%

== Speaker of the House elections (1965–1973) ==
=== 1965 ===
1965 election for Speaker – 89th Congress * denotes incumbent
Party	Candidate	Votes	%
Democratic	John McCormack* (MA 9)	289	67.52
Republican	Gerald Ford (MI 5)	139	32.48
Total votes		428	100
Votes necessary		215	>50

=== 1967 ===
1967 election for Speaker – 90th Congress * denotes incumbent
Party	Candidate	Votes	%
Democratic	John McCormack* (MA 9)	246	56.94
Republican	Gerald Ford (MI 5)	186	43.06
Total votes		432	100
Votes necessary		217	>50

=== 1969 ===
1969 election for Speaker – 91st Congress * denotes incumbent
Party	Candidate	Votes	%
Democratic	John McCormack* (MA 9)	241	56.31
Republican	Gerald Ford (MI 5)	187	43.69
Total votes		428	100
Votes necessary		215	>50

=== 1971 ===
1971 election for Speaker – 92nd Congress
Party	Candidate	Votes	%
Democratic	Carl Albert (OK 3)	250	58.68
Republican	Gerald Ford (MI 5)	176	41.32
Total votes		426	100
Votes necessary		214	>50

=== 1973 ===
1973 election for Speaker – 93rd Congress * denotes incumbent
Party	Candidate	Votes	%
Democratic	Carl Albert* (OK 3)	236	55.66
Republican	Gerald Ford (MI 5)	188	44.34
Total votes		424	100
Votes necessary		213	>50

== Vice presidential confirmation (1973) ==
1973 U.S. Senate Vice presidential confirmation
November 27, 1973	Party				Total votes
November 27, 1973	Democratic	Republican	Conservative	Independent	Total votes
Yes	51	39	1	1	92
No	3	0	0	0	3

1973 U.S. House Vice presidential confirmation
December 6, 1973	Party		Total votes
December 6, 1973	Democratic	Republican	Total votes
Yes	199	188	387
No	35	0	35

== Presidential election (1976) ==
1976 Republican Party presidential primaries * denotes incumbent
Party	Candidate	Aggregate votes	%	#W
Republican	Gerald Ford*	5,529,899	53.29	27
Republican	Ronald Reagan	4,760,222	45.88	24
Republican	Others	44,626	0.43	0
Republican	Unpledged	34,717	0.34	0

1976 Republican presidential nomination * denotes incumbent
Party	Candidate	Votes	%
Republican	Gerald Ford*	1,187	52.57
Republican	Ronald Reagan	1,070	47.39
Republican	Elliot Richardson	1	0.04

1976 United States presidential election * denotes incumbent
Party	Presidential candidate	Vice presidential Candidate	PV (%)	EV
Democratic	Jimmy Carter	Walter Mondale	40,831,881 (50.08)	297
Republican	Gerald Ford*	Bob Dole	39,148,634 (48.01)	240 (Note: One faithless elector in the state of Washington cast his electoral vote for Ronald Reagan (president) and Robert Dole (vice president).)
Independent	Eugene McCarthy	(Note: The running mate of Eugene McCarthy varied from state to state.)	744,763 (0.91)	0
Libertarian	Roger MacBride	David Bergland	172,557 (0.21)	0
American Independent	Lester Maddox	William Dyke	170,373 (0.21)	0
American	Thomas J. Anderson	Rufus Shackelford	158,724 (0.19)	0
Others			313,848 (0.39)	0
Total votes:			81,540,780	538
Votes necessary:				270
