= Earl Ravenal =

American academic (1931–2019)

Earl Cedric Ravenal
- Born: March 29, 1931
- Died: August 31, 2019 (aged 88)

Earl Cedric Ravenal (March 29, 1931 – August 31, 2019) was an American foreign policy analyst, academic, and writer. He served as a distinguished senior fellow in foreign policy studies at the Cato Institute and professor emeritus of the Georgetown University School of Foreign Service.

Ravenal was raised in Providence, Rhode Island. He graduated summa cum laude and Phi Beta Kappa from Harvard University, and received a Henry Fellowship to Cambridge University in England. He attended the Harvard Graduate School of Business Administration Middle Management Program. Ravenal earned his MA and PhD from The Johns Hopkins University School of Advanced International Studies, where he taught prior to his appointment to Georgetown University.

Ravenal served as a division director in the Office of United States Secretary of Defense from 1967 to 1969, under Secretaries of Defense Robert McNamara and Clark Clifford.

In addition to writing several books on the topic of U.S. foreign policy, Ravenal wrote over 200 articles and papers for various publications including The New York Times, The Washington Post, and Foreign Affairs.

He was a candidate for the Libertarian Party's presidential nomination in the 1984 election, finishing second to the party's eventual nominee, David Bergland.

Ravenal died on August 31, 2019, at his secondary residence in Trappe, Maryland.

== Published works ==
- Never again: Learning from America's foreign policy failures. Temple University Press. 1977. ISBN 978-0-87722-187-6.
- NATO: The Tides of Discontent. University of California. 1985. ISBN 978-0-87725-523-9.
- Designing Defense for a New World Order: The Military Budget in 1992 and Beyond. Cato Institute. 1991. ISBN 978-0-932790-86-6.
- Foreign Policy in Uncontrollable World. Cato Institute. 1992. ISBN 978-0-932790-41-5.
- Peace with China?: U. S. Decisions for Asia. Liveright Publishing Corporation. 1996. ISBN 978-0-87140-257-8.
