= 1983 Libertarian National Convention =

United States political event

- 1984 presidential election

Convention
- Date(s): August 29 – September 4
- City: New York City

Candidates
- Presidential nominee: David Bergland of California
- Vice-presidential nominee: James A. Lewis of Connecticut
- Other candidates: Earl Ravenal of Washington D.C. Mary Ruwart of Michigan

The 1983 Libertarian National Convention was held from August 29 to September 4, 1983, at the Sheraton Hotel in New York, New York. The delegates at the convention, on behalf of the U.S. Libertarian Party, nominated David Bergland for the president and James A. Lewis for the vice president in the 1984 presidential election.

Paul Grant was elected as chairman of the Libertarian Party National Committee, winning out over Sheldon Richman. Grant served as chairman from 1983 to 1985.

Libertarians hold a National Convention every two years to vote on party bylaws, platform and resolutions and elect national party officers and a judicial committee. Every four years it nominates presidential and vice presidential candidates.

== Voting for presidential nomination ==
=== First ballot ===
1983 Libertarian Party National Convention total vote count: Round 1
| Candidate | Total votes cast | Percent of votes cast |
|---|---|---|
| Earl Ravenal | 190 | 35.4% |
| David Bergland | 185 | 34.5% |
| Mary Ruwart | 77 | 14.3% |
| Tonie Nathan | 53 | 10.0% |
| Richard Siano | 21 | 3.9% |
| None of the Above | 7 | 1.3% |
| Others (scattered) | 4 | 0.7% |
| | Color key: / 1st place / 2nd place / 3rd place / 4th place / 5th place / 6th place / 7th place | |

=== Second ballot ===
1983 Libertarian Party National Convention total vote count: Round 2
| Candidate | Total votes cast | Percent of votes cast |
|---|---|---|
| David Bergland | 218 | 40.6% |
| Earl Ravenal | 198 | 36.9% |
| Mary Ruwart | 99 | 18.4% |
| Others (scattered) | 22 | 4.1% |
| | Color key: / 1st place / 2nd place / 3rd place / 4th place | |

After the second round, Mary Ruwart dropped out, throwing her support for David Bergland.

=== Third ballot ===
1983 Libertarian Party National Convention total vote count: Round 3
| Candidate | Total votes cast | Percent of votes cast |
|---|---|---|
| David Bergland | 260 | 48.4% |
| Earl Ravenal | 243 | 45.3% |
| None of the Above | 34 | 6.3% |
| | Color key: / 1st place / 2nd place / 3rd place | |

=== Fourth Ballot ===
1983 Libertarian Party National Convention total vote count: Round 4
| Candidate | Total votes cast | Percent of votes cast |
|---|---|---|
| David Bergland | 270 | 51.5% |
| Earl Ravenal | 230 | 43.9% |
| None of the Above | 24 | 4.6% |
| | Color key: / 1st place / 2nd place / 3rd place | |

== Voting for vice presidential nomination ==
A separate vote was held for the vice presidential nomination.

=== First ballot ===
After the first ballot, David Nolan (finishing third) dropped out, throwing his support for James A. Lewis

1983 Libertarian Party National Convention total vote count: Round 1
| Candidate | Total votes cast | Percent of votes cast |
|---|---|---|
| Mary Ruwart | 140 | 31.4% |
| James A. Lewis | 117 | 26.2% |
| David Nolan | 84 | 18.8% |
| Joe Fuhrig | 61 | 13.7% |
| Others (scattered) | 44 | 9.9% |
| | Color key: / 1st place / 2nd place / 3rd place / 4th place / 5th place | |

=== Second ballot ===
Upon Completion of the second ballot, Fuhrig withdrew, allowing Jim Lewis to secure the nomination on the third and final ballot.

1983 Libertarian Party National Convention total vote count: Round 2
| Candidate | Total votes cast | Percent of votes cast |
|---|---|---|
| James A. Lewis | 206 | 46.2% |
| Mary Ruwart | 145 | 32.5% |
| Joe Fuhrig | 91 | 20.4% |
| Others (Scattered) | 4 | 0.9% |
| | Color key: / 1st place / 2nd place / 3rd place / 4th place | |

== See also ==
- 1984 Democratic National Convention
- 1984 Republican National Convention
- 1984 United States presidential election
- U.S. presidential nomination convention
