= Ed Crane (executive) =

American libertarian activist (1944–2026)

- Born: Edward Harrison Crane; August 15, 1944; Los Angeles, California, U.S.
- Died: February 10, 2026 (aged 81); Falls Church, Virginia, U.S.

Academic background
- Education: University of California, Berkeley (BSc); University of Southern California (MBA)

President of the Cato Institute
- In office 1977 – October 1, 2012

3rd Chair of the Libertarian National Committee
- In office 1974–1977
- Preceded by: Susan Nolan
- Succeeded by: David Bergland

2nd Vice Chair of the Libertarian National Committee
- In office 1972–1974
- Preceded by: Susan Nolan
- Influences: Ludwig von Mises, F.A. Hayek, Milton Friedman

Academic work
- Discipline: Economics, politics, social science, culture
- School or tradition: Libertarianism
- Institutions: Cato Institute (1977–2012)

Edward Harrison Crane (August 15, 1944 – February 10, 2026) was an American libertarian activist who co-founded the Cato Institute, serving as the organization's president until October 2012.

In the 1970s, Crane was one of the most active leaders within the Libertarian Party. He directed the party as its national chair from 1974 to 1977, worked on John Hospers's presidential bid and managed Ed Clark's 1978 campaign for Governor of California. In 1980, Crane served as communications director to the Libertarian Party presidential ticket of Clark and vice presidential candidate David H. Koch. Prior to founding the Cato Institute, Crane was a chartered financial analyst and vice president of Alliance Capital in California.

Crane was a member of the board of various organizations, including Americans for Limited Government, a group that assists grassroots efforts throughout the country, and the Institute for Free Speech. He was also a member of the Mont Pelerin Society.

== Tenure at Cato Institute ==
In 1977, with funding from Charles Koch, Crane established the Cato Institute, a libertarian think tank.

While at Cato, Crane expanded the organization from a staff of 10 and a budget of $800,000 when it first opened in San Francisco to a staff of 127 and a budget of $21 million in a newly renovated building in Washington, D.C.

In 2012, a shareholder dispute arose between Crane and Charles and David Koch. Crane accused the Kochs of trying to take control of the organization. The Kochs contended that the shares of deceased shareholder William Niskanen should have been offered to the institute first, and not passed to his widow. Crane later said that he spoke to New Yorker journalist Jane Mayer, whose reporting indicated the conflict was also about the ideological direction of the institute. As part of the dispute settlement, the Cato shareholder agreement was dissolved and Crane agreed to retire.

In 2013, Crane launched Purple PAC, a super PAC that supports candidates and causes consistent with the libertarian platform.

In 2018, several former Cato employees alleged longtime sexual harassment by Crane, and Politico reported that he settled one such claim in 2012. Crane denied the allegations.

== Political views ==
Crane was politically libertarian. He described the core principles of libertarianism as being personal liberty, free markets, and limited government.

In 2012, Crane was supportive of then-presidential candidate Ron Paul on issues such as tax and spending cuts, support for a non-interventionist foreign policy, protections for civil liberties, and the promotion of Austrian economics. At the time, Crane wrote, "The 21st century is likely to be a libertarian century. It is why the focus should be on Ron Paul's philosophy and his policy proposals in 2012."

In 2016, Crane supported presidential candidate Rand Paul. It was reported that Crane had stopped raising money for the Purple PAC that was supporting Paul; but Crane stated that the PAC was still operating and it was not shutting down. He stated, "I'm still 'standing with Rand,' as they say, and there's no one else I can think of supporting."

== Personal life and death ==
Crane was married to Kristina Knall in 1988, and had three children. He died from heart failure in Falls Church, Virginia, on February 10, 2026, at the age of 81.

Party political offices
Preceded by Susan Nolan	Chair of the Libertarian National Committee; 1974–1977	Succeeded by David Bergland
