= List of United States Libertarian Party presidential tickets =

This is a list of the candidates for the offices of president of the United States and vice president of the United States of the Libertarian Party. Opponents who received over one percent of the popular vote or ran an official campaign that received Electoral College votes are listed. Offices held prior to Election Day are included, and those held on Election Day have an italicized end date.

== List of Libertarian presidential tickets ==
=== 1972 ===
| Presidential nominee | 1972 (lost) | | Vice presidential nominee |
|---|---|---|---|
| John Hospers of CA (1918–2011) | Prior experience: Professor of Philosophy; Higher education: Central College, Iowa (BA); University of Iowa (MA); Columbia University (PhD) | Prior experience: Radio and television producer; Activist; Higher education: University of Oregon (BA) | Tonie Nathan of OR (1923–2014) |
| Opponent(s); Richard Nixon (Republican); George McGovern (Democratic); John Schmitz (American; Independent) | Electoral vote: Nixon/Agnew: 520 (96.7%); McGovern/Shriver: 17 (3.2%); Hospers/Nathan: 1 (0.2%); Popular vote: Nixon/Agnew: 47,168,710 (60.6%); McGovern/Shriver 29,173,222 (37.5%); Schmitz/Anderson: 1,100,868 (1.4%); Hospers/Nathan: 3,674 (0.0%) | | Opponent(s); Spiro Agnew (Republican); Sargent Shriver (Democratic); Thomas Anderson (American; Independent) |

=== 1976 ===
| Presidential nominee | 1976 (lost) | | Vice presidential nominee |
|---|---|---|---|
| Roger MacBride of VT (1929–1995) | Prior experience: Vermont House of Representatives (1963–1965); Higher education: Princeton University (BA); Harvard University (JD) | Prior experience: Chair of the Libertarian National Committee (1977–1981); Higher education: Long Beach City College (attended); University of California, Los Angeles (BA); University of Southern California (JD) | David Bergland of CA (1935–2019) |
| Opponent(s); Jimmy Carter (Democratic); Gerald Ford (Republican) | Electoral vote Electoral vote (President): Carter: 297 (55.2%); Ford: 240 (44.6%); Reagan: 1 (0.2%); Electoral vote (Vice President): Mondale: 297 (55.2%); Dole: 241 (44.8%); Popular vote: Carter/Mondale: 40,831,881 (50.1%); Ford/Dole: 39,148,634 (48.0%); MacBride/Bergland: 172,557 (0.2%) | | Opponent(s); Walter Mondale (Democratic); Bob Dole (Republican) |

=== 1980 ===
| Presidential nominee | 1980 (lost) | | Vice presidential nominee |
|---|---|---|---|
| Ed Clark of CA (1930–2025) | Prior experience: Lawyer; Higher education: Dartmouth College (BA); Harvard University (JD) | Prior experience: Entrepreneur; Philanthropist; Activist; Higher education: Massachusetts Institute of Technology (BS, MS) | David Koch of KS (1940–2019) |
| Opponent(s); Ronald Reagan (Republican); Jimmy Carter (Democratic); John B. Anderson (Independent) | Electoral vote: Reagan/Bush: 489 (90.9%); Carter/Mondale: 49 (9.1%); Popular vote: Reagan/Bush: 43,903,230 (50.7%); Carter/Mondale: 35,480,115 (41.0%); Anderson/Lucey: 5,719,850 (6.6%); Clark/Koch: 921,128 (1.1%) | | Opponent(s); George H. W. Bush (Republican); Walter Mondale (Democratic); Patrick Lucey (Independent) |

=== 1984 ===
| Presidential nominee | 1984 (lost) | | Vice presidential nominee |
|---|---|---|---|
| David Bergland of CA (1935–2019) | Prior experience: Chair of the Libertarian National Committee (1977–1981); Higher education: Long Beach City College (attended); University of California, Los Angeles (BA); University of Southern California (JD) | Prior experience: Party organizer; Higher education: Babson College (BA) | Jim Lewis of CT (1933–1997) |
| Opponent(s); Ronald Reagan (Republican); Walter Mondale (Democratic) | Electoral vote: Reagan/Bush: 525 (97.6%); Mondale/Ferraro: 13 (2.4%); Popular vote: Reagan/Bush: 54,455,472 (58.8%); Mondale/Ferraro: 37,577,352 (40.6%); Bergland/Lewis: 228,111 (0.3%) | | Opponent(s); George H. W. Bush (Republican); Geraldine Ferraro (Democratic) |

=== 1988 ===
| Presidential nominee | 1988 (lost) | | Vice presidential nominee |
|---|---|---|---|
| Ron Paul of TX (born 1935) | Prior experience: U.S. House of Representatives (1976–1977, 1979–1985); Higher education: Gettysburg College (BS); Duke University (MD) | Prior experience: Alaska House of Representatives (1985–1987); Higher education: Massachusetts Institute of Technology (BA) | Andre Marrou of AK (born 1938) |
| Opponent(s); George H. W. Bush (Republican); Michael Dukakis (Democratic) | Electoral vote (President): Bush: 426 (79.2%); Dukakis: 111 (20.6%); Bentsen: 1 (0.2%); Electoral vote (Vice President): Quayle: 426 (79.2%); Bentsen: 111 (20.6%); Dukakis: 1 (0.2%); Popular vote: Bush/Quayle: 48,886,097 (53.4%); Dukakis/Bentsen: 41,809,074 (45.7%); Paul/Marrou: 431,750 (0.5%) | | Opponent(s); Dan Quayle (Republican); Lloyd Bentsen (Democratic) |

=== 1992 ===
| Presidential nominee | 1992 (lost) | | Vice presidential nominee |
|---|---|---|---|
| Andre Marrou of AK (born 1938) | Prior experience: Alaska House of Representatives (1985–1987); Higher education: Massachusetts Institute of Technology (BA) | Prior experience: Activist; Higher education: University of Maryland, College Park (BS); University of Maryland, Baltimore (MD); Georgetown University (JD) | Nancy Lord of NV (1952–2022) |
| Opponent(s); Bill Clinton (Democratic); George H. W. Bush (Republican); Ross Perot (Independent) | Electoral vote: Clinton/Gore: 370 (68.8%); Bush/Quayle: 168 (31.2%); Popular vote: Clinton/Gore: 44,909,806 (43.0%); Bush/Quayle: 39,104,550 (37.5%); Perot/Stockdale: 19,743,821 (18.9%); Marrou/Lord: 290,087 (0.3%) | | Opponent(s); Al Gore (Democratic); Dan Quayle (Republican); James Stockdale (Independent) |

=== 1996, 2000 ===
| Presidential nominee | 1996 (lost), 2000 (lost) | | Vice presidential nominee |
|---|---|---|---|
| Harry Browne of TN (1933–2006) | Prior experience: Author; Higher education: None | Prior experience: Professor; Higher education: Baylor University (BS); Southern Methodist University (MBA); Clemson University (PhD) | Jo Jorgensen of SC (born 1957) (1996) |
| Harry Browne of TN (1933–2006) | Prior experience: Author; Higher education: None | Prior experience: Mayor of Bellflower, CA (1998–1999); Higher education: Cerritos College (BS) | Art Olivier of CA (born 1957) (2000) |
| Opponent(s); Bill Clinton (Democratic); Bob Dole (Republican); Ross Perot (Reform) | Electoral vote: Clinton/Gore: 379 (70.4%); Dole/Kemp: 159 (29.6%); Popular vote: Clinton/Gore: 47,401,185 (49.2%); Dole/Kemp: 39,197,469 (40.7%); Perot/Choate: 8,085,294 (8.4%); Browne/Jorgensen: 485,759 (0.5%) | | Opponent(s); Al Gore (Democratic); Jack Kemp (Republican); Pat Choate (Reform) |
| Opponent(s); George W. Bush (Republican); Al Gore (Democratic); Ralph Nader (Green) | Electoral vote: Bush/Cheney: 271 (50.4%); Gore/Lieberman: 266 (49.4%); Popular vote: Gore/Lieberman: 50,999,897 (48.4%); Bush/Cheney: 50,456,002 (47.9%); Nader/LaDuke: 2,882,955 (2.7%); Browne/Olivier: 384,431 (0.4%) | | Opponent(s); Dick Cheney (Republican); Joe Lieberman (Democratic); Winona LaDuke (Green) |

=== 2004 ===
| Presidential nominee | 2004 (lost) | | Vice presidential nominee |
|---|---|---|---|
| Michael Badnarik of TX (1954-2022) | Prior experience: Radio show host; Higher education: Indiana University, Bloomington (attended) | Prior experience: Activist; Higher education: Brown University (BA); New York University (MA); St. John's University, New York (JD); Columbia University (MA); American College of Metaphysical Theology (PhD) | Richard Campagna of IA (born 1960) |
| Opponent(s); George W. Bush (Republican); John Kerry (Democratic) | Electoral vote: Bush: 286 (53.2%); Kerry: 251 (46.7%); Edwards: 1 (0.2%); Electoral vote (Vice President): Cheney: 286 (53.2%); Edwards: 252 (46.8%); Popular vote: Bush/Cheney: 62,040,610 (50.7%); Kerry/Edwards: 59,028,444 (48.3%); Badnarik/Campagna: 397,265 (0.3%) | | Opponent(s); Dick Cheney (Republican); John Edwards (Democratic) |

=== 2008 ===
| Presidential nominee | 2008 (lost) | | Vice presidential nominee |
|---|---|---|---|
| Bob Barr of GA (born 1948) | Prior experience: U.S. Attorney for the Northern District of Georgia (1986–1990); U.S. House of Representatives (1995–2003); Higher education: University of Southern California (BA); George Washington University (MA); Georgetown University (JD) | Prior experience: Political commentator; Higher education: Columbia University (BA) | Wayne Root of NV (born 1961) |
| Opponent(s); Barack Obama (Democratic); John McCain (Republican) | Electoral vote: Obama/Biden: 365 (67.8%); McCain/Palin: 173 (32.2%); Popular vote: Obama/Biden: 69,498,516 (52.9%); McCain/Palin: 59,948,323 (45.7%); Barr/Root: 523,715 (0.4%) | | Opponent(s); Joe Biden (Democratic); Sarah Palin (Republican) |

=== 2012, 2016 ===
| Presidential nominee | 2012 (lost), 2016 (lost) | | Vice presidential nominee |
|---|---|---|---|
| Gary Johnson of NM (born 1953) | Prior experience: Governor of New Mexico (1995–2003); Higher education: University of New Mexico (BS) | Prior experience: Jurist; Higher education: University of California, Los Angeles (BA); University of Southern California (JD) | Jim Gray of CA (born 1945) (2012) |
| Gary Johnson of NM (born 1953) | Prior experience: Governor of New Mexico (1995–2003); Higher education: University of New Mexico (BS) | Prior experience: United States Assistant Attorney General for the Criminal Division (1986–1988); U.S. Attorney for the District of Massachusetts (1981–1986); Governor of Massachusetts (1991–1997); Higher education: Harvard University (BA, JD); University College, Oxford (attended) | Bill Weld of MA (born 1945) (2016) |
| Opponent(s); Barack Obama (Democratic); Mitt Romney (Republican) | Electoral vote: Obama/Biden: 332; Romney/Ryan: 206; Popular vote: Obama/Biden: 65,915,796 (51.1%); Romney/Ryan: 60,933,500 (47.2%); Johnson/Gray: 1,275,971 (1.0%) | | Opponent(s); Joe Biden (Democratic); Paul Ryan (Republican) |
| Opponent(s); Donald Trump (Republican); Hillary Clinton (Democratic); Jill Stein (Green) | Electoral vote (President): Trump: 304 (56.5%); Clinton: 227 (42.2%); Powell: 3 (0.6%); Kasich: 1 (0.2%); Paul: 1 (0.2%); Sanders: 1 (0.2%); Spotted Eagle: 1 (0.2%); Electoral vote (Vice President): Pence: 305 (56.7%); Kaine: 227 (42.2%); Warren: 2 (0.4%); Cantwell: 1 (0.2%); Collins: 1 (0.2%); Fiorina: 1 (0.2%); LaDuke: 1 (0.2%); Popular vote: Clinton/Kaine: 65,853,516 (48.2%); Trump/Pence: 62,984,825 (46.1%); Johnson/Weld: 4,489,341 (3.3%); Stein/Baraka: 1,457,216 (1.1%) | | Opponent(s); Mike Pence (Republican); Tim Kaine (Democratic); Ajamu Baraka (Green) |

=== 2020 ===
| Presidential nominee | 2020 (lost) | | Vice presidential nominee |
|---|---|---|---|
| Jo Jorgensen of SC (born 1957) | Prior experience: Professor; Higher education: Baylor University (BS); Southern Methodist University (MBA); Clemson University (PhD) | Prior experience: Activist; Higher education: None | Spike Cohen of SC (born 1982) |
| Opponent(s); Joe Biden (Democratic); Donald Trump (Republican) | Electoral vote: Biden/Harris: 306 (56.9%); Trump/Pence: 232 (43.1%); Jorgensen/Cohen: 0; Popular vote: Biden/Harris: 81,268,924 (51.3%); Trump/Pence: 74,216,154 (46.9%); Jorgensen/Cohen: 1,865,724 (1.2%) | | Opponent(s); Kamala Harris (Democratic); Mike Pence (Republican) |

=== 2024 ===
| Presidential nominee | 2024 (lost) | | Vice presidential nominee |
|---|---|---|---|
| Chase Oliver of GA (born 1985) | Prior experience: Activist; Higher education: Georgia State University (attended) | Prior experience: Economist; Higher education: Rensselaer Polytechnic Institute (BS, MBA); George Washington University (MA, PhD) | Mike ter Maat of VA (born 1961) |
| Opponent(s) Donald Trump (Republican); Kamala Harris (Democratic); Jill Stein (Green); Robert F. Kennedy Jr. (Independent) | Electoral vote: Trump/Vance: 295 (54.8%); Harris/Walz: 226 (44.2%); Popular vote: Trump/Vance: 77,303,573 (49.9%); Harris/Walz: 75,019,257 (48.4%); Stein/Ware: 868,945 (0.6%); Kennedy/Shanahan: 757,371 (0.5%); Oliver/Ter Maat: 650,120 (0.4%) | | Opponent(s) JD Vance (Republican); Tim Walz (Democratic); Butch Ware (Green); Nicole Shanahan (Independent) |

== Vote percentages Map ==
2016 United States presidential election results by county, shaded according to percentage of the vote for Libertarian candidate Gary Johnson

2020 United States presidential election, Jo Jorgensen's state-by-state performance across the nation. Percentage shades are rough increments of 0.25%.

== See also ==
- Libertarian National Convention
- Electoral history of the Libertarian Party (United States)
- List of United States Democratic Party presidential tickets
- List of United States Republican Party presidential tickets
- List of United States Green Party presidential tickets
