= Ed Clark =

American lawyer and politician in California (1930–2025)

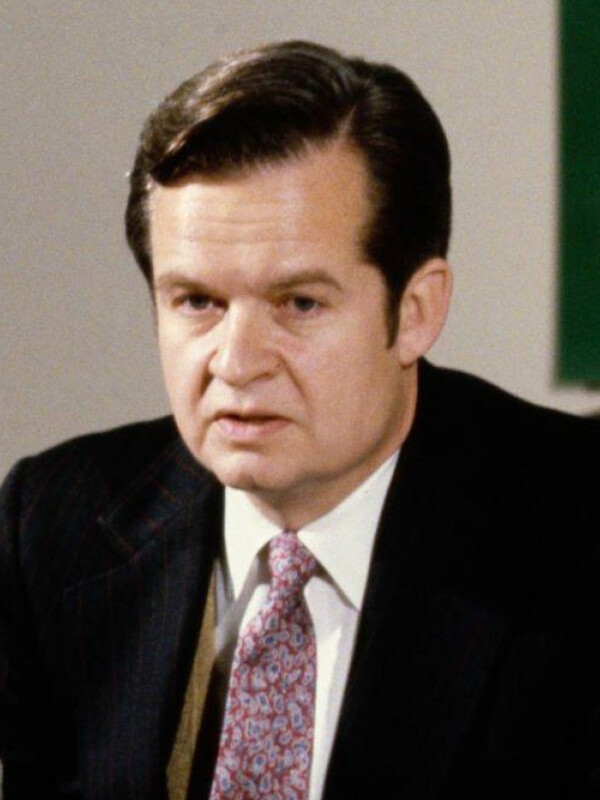
- Clark, 1980

Chair of the Libertarian Party of California
- In office 1973–1974

Chair of the Libertarian Party of New York
- In office 1972–1973
- Preceded by: Party established

Personal details
- Born: May 4, 1930 Middleborough, Massachusetts, U.S.
- Died: June 18, 2025 (aged 95) Pasadena, California, U.S.
- Party: Libertarian (after 1971)
- Other political affiliations: Republican (until 1971)
- Spouse: Alicia Garcia (m. 1970)
- Children: 1 Edward E. Clark Jr ("Ned") - July 16, 1974 - January 1, 2021
- Education: Dartmouth College (BA); Harvard University (JD)
- Occupation: Attorney

Military service
- Branch: United States Navy
- Years of service: 1952–1954 (active service); 1954–1965 (reserves)
- Rank: Lieutenant (junior grade)

Edward Emerson Clark (May 4, 1930 – June 18, 2025) was an American lawyer and politician who ran for governor of California in 1978, and for president of the United States as the nominee of the Libertarian Party in the 1980 presidential election.

== Background ==
Edward Emerson Clark was born in Middleborough, Massachusetts, in 1930. He was an honors graduate of Tabor Academy, Dartmouth College, and received a J.D. degree from Harvard Law School. He was in active service in the United States Navy from 1952 to 1954, as a lieutenant (junior grade), and was a reservist until 1965.

Clark worked as a corporate lawyer with ARCO, first in New York City and then in Los Angeles. Once a liberal Republican, he joined the Libertarian Party following President Richard Nixon's imposition of wage and price controls in 1971. In 1972, he was the first chairman of the Libertarian Party of New York, and chaired the Libertarian Party of California from 1973 to 1974.

In 1970, Clark married Alicia Garcia, a Mexican-born textiles executive. She chaired the Libertarian National Committee from 1981 to 1983. The couple were longtime supporters of the Los Angeles Opera. They had a son.

Clark died in Pasadena, California, on June 18, 2025, at the age of 95.

== 1978 California gubernatorial campaign ==
In 1978, Clark received some 377,960 votes, 5.5% of the popular vote, in a race for governor of California. Although a member of the Libertarian Party, he appeared on the California ballot as an independent candidate, due to ballot access laws.

Another factor leading to the unprecedented (for California) 5.5% vote total for Clark was his libertarian campaign occurring the same year as the successful Proposition 13 which limited property taxes, and the unsuccessful anti-gay Briggs Initiative (Proposition 6). Clark and the California Libertarian Party campaigned in support for Proposition 13 and in opposition to Proposition 6 both of which turned out people to the polls who might be more inclined to favor a libertarian candidate.

Clark lost the race to Jerry Brown, who was re-elected with 56.0% of the vote. Republican nominee Evelle J. Younger had 36.5% of the vote.

== 1980 presidential campaign ==
In 1979, Clark won the Libertarian Party presidential nomination at the party's convention in Los Angeles, California. He published a book on his programs, A New Beginning, with an introduction by Eugene McCarthy. During the campaign, Clark positioned himself as a peace candidate and emphasized both large budget and tax cuts, as well as outreach to liberals and progressives unhappy with the resumption of Selective Service registration and the arms race with the Soviet Union. Clark was endorsed by the Peoria Journal Star of Peoria, Illinois.

When asked in a television interview to summarize libertarianism, Clark used the phrase "low-tax liberalism," causing some consternation among traditional libertarian theorists, most notably Murray Rothbard. Clark's running to the center marked the start of a split within the Libertarian Party between a moderate faction led by Ed Crane and a radical faction led by Rothbard that eventually came to a head in 1983, with the moderate faction walking out of the party convention after the nomination for the 1984 presidential race went to David Bergland.

Ed Clark's running mate in 1980 was David H. Koch of Koch Industries, who pledged part of his personal fortune to the campaign for the vice-presidential nomination, enabling the Clark/Koch ticket to largely fund itself and run national television advertising.

Clark received 921,128 votes (1.1% of the total nationwide); the highest number and percentage of popular votes a Libertarian Party candidate had ever received in a presidential race up to that point. His strongest support was in Alaska, where he came in third place with 11.7% of the vote, finishing ahead of independent candidate John Anderson and receiving almost half as many votes as Jimmy Carter. Clark's record for most votes won by a Libertarian presidential candidate stood for 32 years until it was broken by Gary Johnson in 2012. His Libertarian vote percentage of 1.1% ranks 3rd behind Johnson's 3.3% showing in 2016 and Jo Jorgensen's 1.2% performance in 2020.

After his presidential campaign, Clark mostly left politics, and most of his supporters gave up their interest in the party, but he stayed as a Libertarian.

Party political offices
Preceded by Roger MacBride	Libertarian nominee for President of the United States; 1980	Succeeded by David Bergland
