= Same-sex marriage in Washington =

Same-sex marriage in Washington may refer to:

- Same-sex marriage in Washington (state)
- Same-sex marriage in Washington, D.C.
