= Tonie Nathan =

American media producer and political activist (1923–2014)

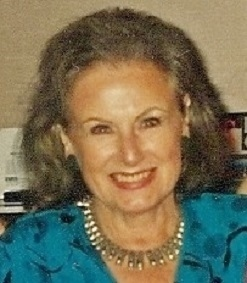
- Nathan in 1993
- Born: Theodora Nathalia Nathan; February 9, 1923; New York City, U.S.
- Died: March 20, 2014 (aged 91); Eugene, Oregon, U.S.
- Education: University of Oregon
- Occupations: Radio producer; television producer; political activist
- Political party: Libertarian
- Spouse: Charles Nathan (m. 1942; died 2012)
- Children: 3

Theodora Nathalia "Tonie" Nathan (February 9, 1923 – March 20, 2014) was an American radio producer, television producer, and political activist. She was the first woman to receive an electoral vote in a United States presidential election. She was the 1972 vice presidential nominee of the Libertarian Party and running mate of John Hospers, when Roger MacBride, a Republican elector from Virginia, cast the historic vote as a faithless elector.

== Background ==
Nathan was born in 1923 to Jewish parents in New York City. Her last name at birth was Nathan, and she married a man, Charles Nathan, who had the same last name.

She operated her own insurance agency, a music publishing firm and a decorating service in the Los Angeles area before moving to Eugene, Oregon. She earned a bachelor's degree in journalism from the University of Oregon in 1971. Nathan then worked as a radio and television producer. She produced and occasionally hosted a daily talk show on KVAL-TV (CBS affiliate) in Eugene.

== Political campaigns ==
=== 1972 vice-presidential nomination ===
At the first presidential nominating convention of the Libertarian Party in 1972, Nathan was nominated by the convention delegates to run for vice president with presidential candidate John Hospers, chairman of the philosophy department at the University of Southern California. While the ticket received only 3,674 official votes out of more than 75 million votes cast, Republican elector Roger MacBride of Virginia chose to vote for Hospers and Nathan instead of Nixon and Agnew. As a result, Nathan became the first woman and the first Jew in American history to have received an electoral vote in a presidential election. (Although Barry Goldwater was half-Jewish by ethnicity, he was not Jewish by religion, as he was raised in the Episcopalian faith of his mother; Goldwater received his electoral votes 8 years before Nathan received hers.)

Nathan and Hospers campaigned on a platform of minimal government intervention.

=== 1976 vice-presidential candidacy ===
Nathan consented to have her name put forward for the Libertarian vice-presidential nomination in the 1976 presidential election, though she did not actively campaign for the position. She lost that nomination to Jim Lewis.

=== 1992 Oregon State Senate campaign ===
Nathan ran against Democrat Bill Dwyer in the 1992 Oregon State Senate election to represent Oregon's 21st House district. She lost, receiving 17.3% of the vote compared to Dwyers' 82.7%.

=== Senate and House of Representatives campaigns ===
Following her vice-presidential run, she made a series of unsuccessful runs as a Libertarian candidate during the 1970s through the 1990s, for offices including the United States Senate and the House of Representatives. In the 1980 U.S. Senate election, Nathan participated in three statewide television debates with incumbent Bob Packwood and then-State Senator Ted Kulongoski. She received 43,686 votes for 3.83% of the vote. In 1990 Nathan ran as a Libertarian candidate for the U.S. House of Representatives for Oregon's 4th congressional district. She was the lone challenger to incumbent Congressman Peter DeFazio and received 26,432 votes for 14% of the vote.

Nathan ran unsuccessfully for the Oregon State Senate in 1992 and 1998.

== Other political activities ==
Nathan was a founding member and former vice chair of the Libertarian Party, as well as a founding member and former president of the Association of Libertarian Feminists. She was a speaker at the 2012 Libertarian National Convention, where she also announced Gary Johnson as the 2012 Libertarian Party presidential nominee.

== Views ==
Nathan was originally a Democrat until one of her sons, Paul, gave her some writings by Ayn Rand. That helped spur his mother's political views of freedom, free markets and individuality, and prompted her to switch her political allegiance from the Democratic to Libertarian Party, Paul said. She attended the party's first national convention in 1972 in Colorado as an interested observer and freelance writer, but was ultimately asked to join the party's national ticket as a running mate. Throughout the years, Nathan championed a number of social and fiscal issues such as ending the military draft and the war on drugs, advocating historic preservation, abortion rights and a flat tax.

During the 2004 presidential election, Nathan wrote a column for LewRockwell.com saying that Americans "should vote their consciences and pick the candidate who best represents their values." She also stated, "It makes you wonder, doesn't it. What is the major news media afraid of? Could it be that most Americans share the Libertarian ideals of Republican fiscal conservatism (reducing the size and cost of government) and Democratic social liberalism (allowing citizens control over their personal lives)? Perhaps such Libertarian views represent a genuine threat to both major parties..." and "It is possible that during the coming debates President Bush or Senator Kerry will discuss the many issues that created reasons for new political parties to form – issues on environmentalism, a possible draft, the Drug War, abortion and gay rights, the falling dollar, immigration laws, foreign policy principles, the unwieldy IRS code and the Supreme Court's adherence to the Constitution."

== Personal life ==
Nathan was married to Charles "Chuck" Nathan, an ASCAP composer who wrote top-ten hit songs in the 1950s. They were married from 1942 until his death in 2012. The couple had three sons.

=== Death ===
Nathan died on March 20, 2014, at the age of 91 from Alzheimer's disease.

Party political offices
First	Libertarian nominee for Vice President of the United States; 1972	Succeeded by David Bergland
