= James A. Lewis (politician) =

American politician, Connecticut (1933–1997)

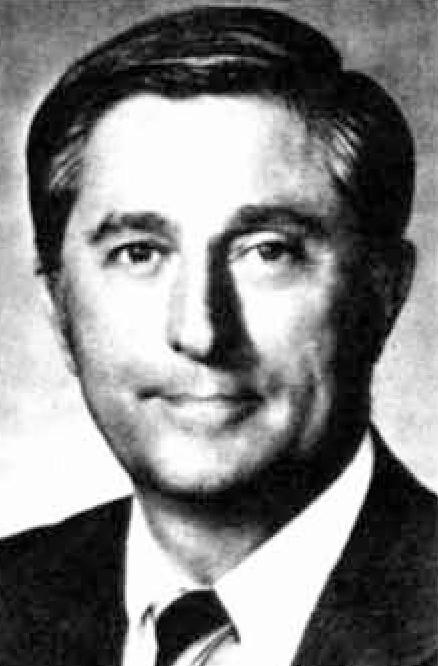

Personal details
- Born: April 20, 1933 Old Saybrook, Connecticut, U.S.
- Died: February 22, 1997 (aged 63) Norwich, Connecticut, U.S.
- Party: Libertarian
- Education: Babson College

James A. "Jim" Lewis (April 20, 1933 – February 22, 1997, in Old Saybrook, Connecticut) was the Libertarian Party's vice-presidential nominee in the 1984 U.S. presidential election, sharing the party ticket with David Bergland. The ticket received 228,111 votes (0.3%) to finish third overall.

Lewis, from his home in Old Saybrook, Connecticut, made campaign stops across the United States during his campaign, and co-authored a book with Jim Peron, entitled Liberty Reclaimed.

In 1987 Lewis ran for the 1988 Libertarian Party presidential nomination finishing third with 12.8% of the vote at the 1987 Libertarian National Convention. Lewis finished behind nominee Ron Paul (51.3%) and Russell Means (31.4%).

Lewis had earlier (1982) run for U.S. Senate in Connecticut as a Libertarian finishing fourth (receiving 8,163 votes (0.8%)) and had served from 1981 until 1983 as a representative to the Libertarian National Committee.

Lewis graduated from Babson College in 1958, and spent many years as a salesman for the General Book Binding Company of Cleveland, Ohio.

== Publications ==
- Lewis, Jim; Peron, Jim (1984). Liberty Reclaimed, A New Look at American Politics – via Internet Archive.

Party political offices
Preceded by David Koch	Libertarian nominee for Vice President of the United States; 1984	Succeeded by Andre Marrou
