= John Hospers =

American philosopher and politician (1918–2011)

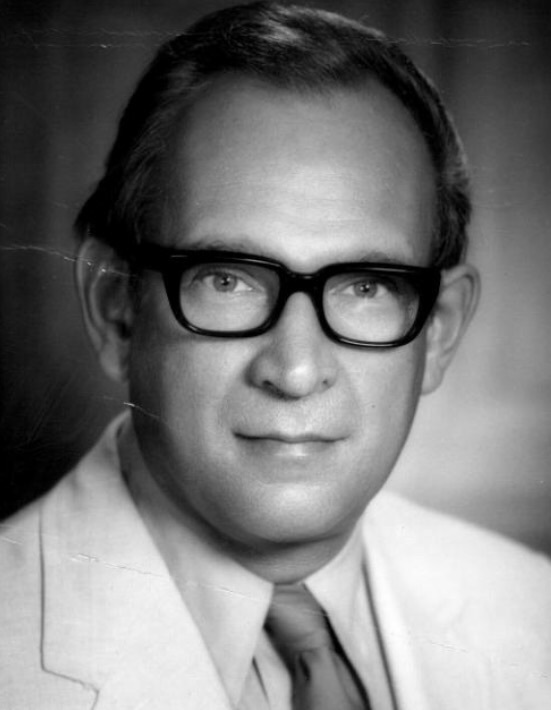
- Campaign portrait, 1972
- Born: June 9, 1918; Pella, Iowa, U.S.
- Died: June 12, 2011 (aged 93); Los Angeles, California, U.S.
- Political party: Libertarian (before 1991); Republican (after 1991)

Academic background
- Education: Central College, Iowa; University of Iowa (MA); Columbia University (PhD)

Academic work
- Era: 20th-century philosophy
- Institutions: University of Minnesota; Brooklyn College; California State College, Los Angeles; University of Southern California
- Main interests: Aesthetics; ethics; objectivism

John Hospers (June 9, 1918 – June 12, 2011) was an American philosopher and political activist. Hospers was interested in Objectivism, and was once a friend of the philosopher Ayn Rand, though he later broke with her. In 1972, Hospers became the first presidential candidate of the Libertarian Party, and was the only minor party candidate to receive an electoral vote in that year's U.S. presidential election.

== Background ==
John Hospers was born to a Dutch-American family in Pella, Iowa, on June 9, 1918, the son of Dena Helena (Verhey) and John De Gelder Hospers. He graduated from Central College in 1939 before earning an MA in English from the University of Iowa in 1942 and a PhD in philosophy from Columbia University in 1946. He conducted research, wrote, and taught in areas of philosophy, including aesthetics and ethics. He taught philosophy at the University of Minnesota, Brooklyn College, California State College Los Angeles (1966–1968) and at the University of Southern California, where for many years he was chairman of the philosophy department and professor emeritus.

In 2002, an hour-long video about Hospers' life, work, and philosophy was released by the Liberty Fund of Indianapolis, as part of its Classics of Liberty series.

Multiple sources, including the Libertarian Party, have referred to Hospers as the first openly gay person to run for president of the United States. However, The Guardian reported that his family "strenuously denied" that he was gay.

Hospers died in Los Angeles on June 12, 2011, at the age of 93.

== Libertarianism ==
=== Friendship with Ayn Rand ===
During the period he taught philosophy at Brooklyn College, Hospers was very interested in Objectivism. He appeared on radio shows with Ayn Rand, and devoted considerable attention to her ideas in his ethics textbook Human Conduct.

According to Rand's biographer, Barbara Branden, Hospers met Rand when she addressed the student body at Brooklyn College. They became friends and had lengthy philosophical conversations. Rand's discussions with Hospers contributed to her decision to write non-fiction. Hospers read Atlas Shrugged (1957), which he considered an aesthetic triumph. Although Hospers became convinced of the validity of Rand's moral and political views, he disagreed with her about issues of epistemology, the subject of their extensive correspondence. Hospers also disagreed with Rand about free will (he favored determinism, while she advocated a libertarian view) and conscription (Hospers supported it, Rand was opposed). Rand broke with Hospers after he, in his position as moderator, critiqued her address, and she felt he had criticized her talk on "Art and Sense of Life" before the American Society of Aesthetics at Harvard.

=== 1972 presidential candidacy ===
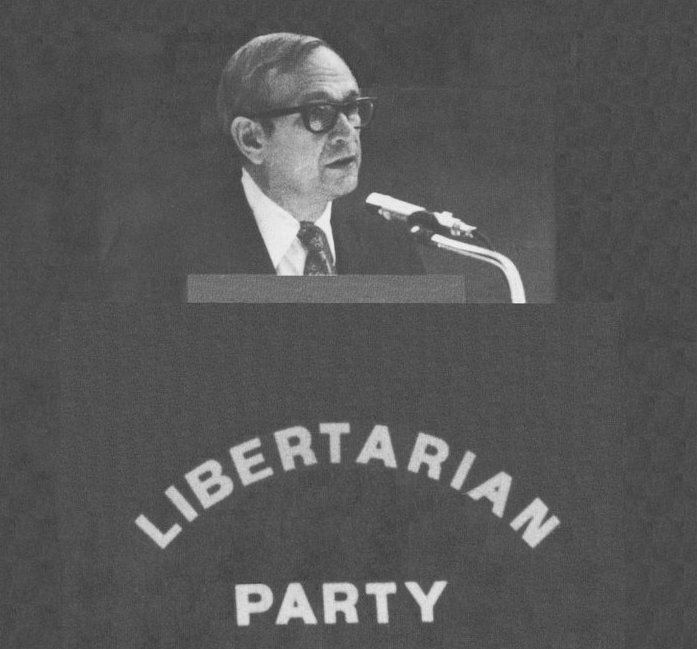
Hospers campaigning in 1972

In the 1972 United States presidential election, Hospers and Tonie Nathan were the first presidential and vice-presidential nominees, respectively, of the newly formed Libertarian Party. The Libertarian Party was poorly organized, and Hospers and Nathan managed to get on the ballot in only two states (Washington and Colorado), receiving 3,674 popular votes.

Hospers and Nathan received one electoral vote from faithless elector Roger MacBride, a Republican from Virginia, resulting in Nathan's becoming the first woman and the first Jew to receive an electoral vote in a United States presidential election.

In the 1972 presidential election, almost every state voted to re-elect the Republican Richard Nixon–Spiro Agnew ticket for President and Vice President of the United States (red). Massachusetts and the District of Columbia voted for the Democratic George McGovern–Sargent Shriver ticket (blue). MacBride's vote for Hospers–Nathan is coded as a yellow dot on red Virginia on this map.

=== Later views ===
Hospers (right) at the ISIL World Conference.

By 1991, Hospers had left the Libertarians for the Republican Party, where he helped establish the Republican Liberty Caucus. He adopted more conventionally conservative views in his later writings. In 1998, Hospers wrote an article rejecting open border immigration; in a 2007 revision of his book Libertarianism, the author said he supported the Iraq War.

== Bibliography ==
Hospers' books include:

- Meaning and Truth in the Arts (1946)
- Introductory Readings in Aesthetics (1969)
- Artistic Expression (1971)
- Libertarianism – A Political Philosophy for Tomorrow (1971)
- Understanding the Arts (1982)
- Law and the Market (1985)
- Human Conduct (now in its 3rd edition, 1995)
- An Introduction to Philosophical Analysis (now in the 4th edition, 1996)

Hospers was editor of three anthologies, and contributed to books edited by others. He wrote more than 100 articles in various scholarly and popular journals.

Hospers was editor of The Personalist (1968–1982) and The Monist (1982–1992), and was a senior editor at Liberty magazine. Additionally Hospers wrote the article "Art and Morality" for the Journal of Comparative Literature and Aesthetics (JCLA), Vol. 1, No. 1, Summer 1978.

== See also ==
- American philosophy
- Libertarianism in the United States
- List of American philosophers

Party political offices
First	Libertarian nominee for President of the United States; 1972	Succeeded by Roger MacBride
