= Roger MacBride =

American writer, TV producer, and politician (1929–1995)

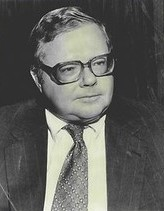

Member of the Vermont House of Representatives
- In office 1963–1965

Personal details
- Born: Roger Lea MacBride; August 6, 1929 New Rochelle, New York, U.S.
- Died: March 5, 1995 (aged 65) Miami Beach, Florida, U.S.
- Party: Republican (before 1972, 1980s–1995); Libertarian (1972–1980s)
- Spouse: Susan Ford
- Children: 1
- Education: Princeton University; Harvard University
- Occupation: Lawyer; author; political activist

Roger Lea MacBride (August 6, 1929 – March 5, 1995) was an American lawyer, political figure, and writer. After working as a lawyer early in his career, he inherited the estate of Laura Ingalls Wilder. He edited and published additional Wilder materials and later wrote a Rose Years spin‑off series set in the Little House on the Prairie universe. He initiated the development of its television adaptation.

In politics, MacBride served a single term as a Republican member of the Vermont House of Representatives in the 1960s. When serving as a Republican presidential elector in Virginia in 1972, he defected from his pledged vote and became a faithless elector, casting a vote for the Libertarian Party's inaugural ticket of John Hospers for president and Tonie Nathan for vice president. Four years later, the party nominated him as their presidential candidate.

== Background ==
MacBride was born in 1929 in New Rochelle, New York, the son of Elise Fairfax (Lea) and William Burt MacBride, an editor. He called himself "the adopted grandson" of a family friend, writer and libertarian political theorist Rose Wilder Lane, whom he met when he was 14 years of age. Lane, daughter of Laura Ingalls Wilder, noted author of the Little House series of books, designated MacBride as her "political disciple," executor, and sole heir.

MacBride was a graduate of Princeton University and Harvard Law School.

== Law career ==
MacBride worked for White & Case, a law firm on Wall Street, for several years before opening a small practice in Vermont. By the mid-1970s, MacBride had relocated to Virginia and was no longer practicing law full time.

== Writing and television producing career ==
MacBride was designated by Rose Wilder Lane as her heir. He gained control of her literary estate on her death in 1968. In 1971 he published The First Four Years. In 1974 he edited and published Laura Ingalls Wilder's letters to her husband Almanzo as West From Home. He approved the creation of the television series in the 1970s. He was the credited author of a fictionalized series on the life of Rose Wilder Lane. He was author of record for three additional Little House books and launched the Rocky Ridge Years series of children's novels, describing Lane's Ozark childhood. He published two books on constitutional law, The American Electoral College and Treaties versus the Constitution, and authored a Libertarian Party manifesto: A New Dawn for America: The Libertarian Challenge.

In the 1970s, MacBride co-created the television series Little House on the Prairie and served as a co-producer for the show.

== Political career ==
=== Vermont politics ===
MacBride was elected to the Vermont House of Representatives in 1962 and served one term. While in the state legislature, he proposed the abolition of the state college system.

Running as a Goldwater Republican, he made an unsuccessful bid for the Republican Party nomination for Governor of Vermont in 1964.

=== 1972 electoral vote ===
MacBride was the treasurer of the Republican Party of Virginia in 1972 and one of the party's electors when Richard Nixon won the popular vote for his second term as president of the United States. MacBride, however, as a "faithless elector," voted for the nominees of the Libertarian Party: presidential candidate John Hospers and vice-presidential candidate Tonie Nathan. In doing so, MacBride made Nathan the first woman in U.S. history to receive an Electoral College vote. Political pundit David Boaz later commented in Liberty magazine that MacBride was "faithless to Nixon and Agnew, anyway, but faithful to the constitutional principles Rose Wilder Lane had instilled in him."

=== 1976 presidential campaign ===
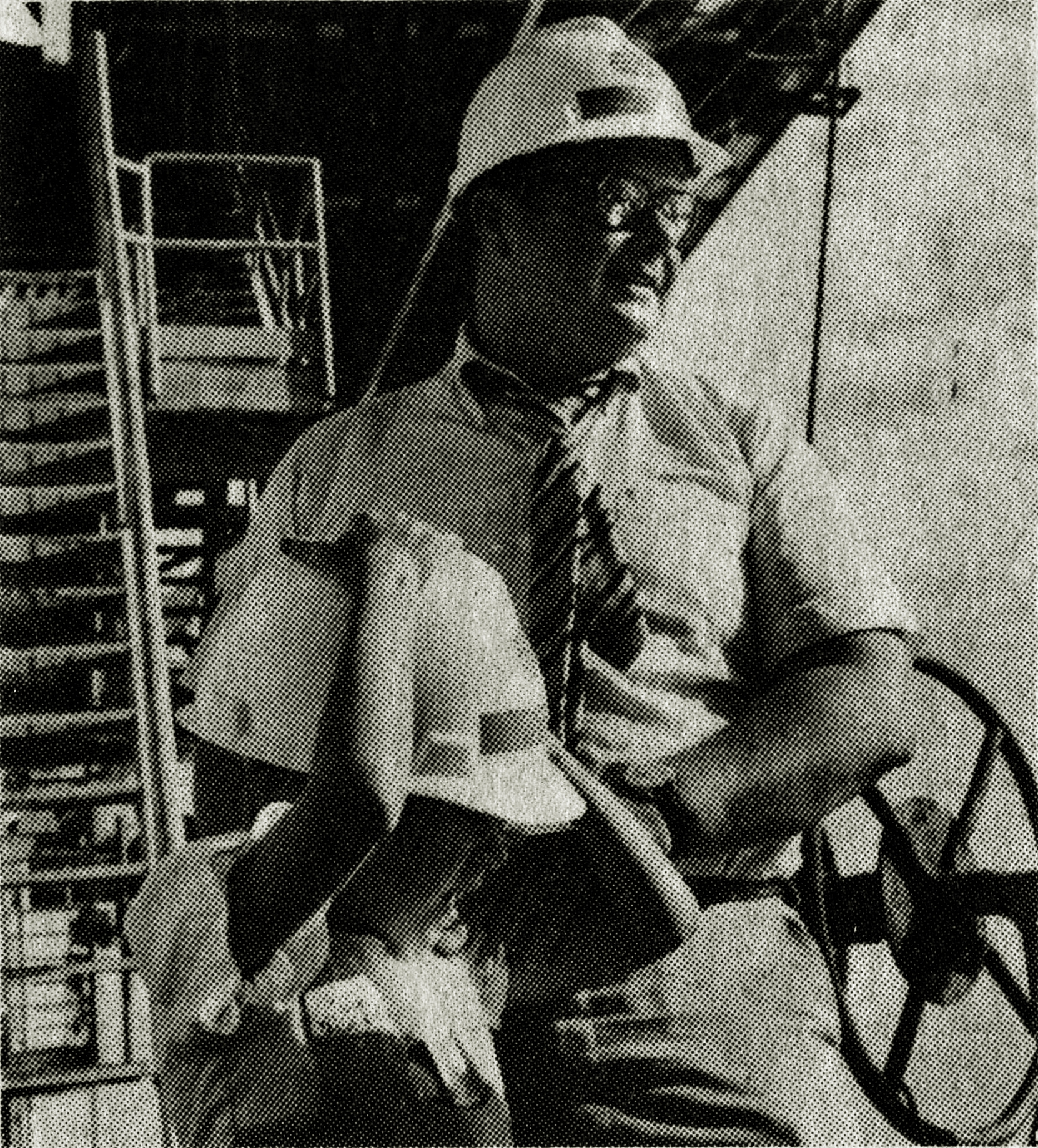
MacBride touring the Prudhoe Bay Oil Field during his presidential campaign in 1976

After casting his electoral vote in 1972, MacBride gained favor within the fledgling Libertarian Party, which had been founded the previous year. As the Libertarian presidential nominee in 1976, he achieved ballot access in 32 states, campaigning on a platform of support for a free market system, a return to the gold standard, the abolition of the Federal Reserve, an end to corporate welfare, the abolition of the FCC, a foreign policy of non-interventionism, and the abolition of victimless crimes. MacBride and his running mate David Bergland received 172,553 (0.2%) popular votes but no electoral votes. His best performance was in Alaska, where he received 6,785 votes, or nearly 5.5%.

=== Republican Liberty Caucus ===
MacBride rejoined the Republican Party in the 1980s and helped establish the Republican Liberty Caucus, a group promoting libertarian principles within the Republican Party. He chaired this group from 1992 until his death in 1995.

== Personal life and death ==
MacBride married Susan Ford. They then adopted a baby whom they named Abigail MacBride.

MacBride died of heart failure at his home in Miami Beach, Florida, on March 5, 1995, at the age of 65. He willed his estate, including the rights to the Little House franchise, to his daughter. In 1999, this was challenged by the public library system of Wright County, Missouri, containing the Laura Ingalls Wilder Library in Wilder's hometown of Mansfield; they contended that her will gave her daughter ownership of the literary estate for her lifetime only, and that all rights should have reverted to the library after Rose Wilder Lane's death in 1968. The estate was estimated to be worth around $100 million at the time. In 2001, a settlement was reached in which the Wright County library system was paid $875,000, but control of the estate remained with the MacBride family.

In an obituary for MacBride, David Boaz wrote: "In some ways he was the last living link to the best of the Old Right, the rugged-individualist, anti-New Deal, anti-interventionist spirit of Rep. Howard Buffett, Albert Jay Nock, H. L. Mencken, Isabel Paterson, and Lane."

== Partial bibliography ==
- Series on the early life of Rose Wilder
  - Little House on Rocky Ridge (1993)
  - Little Farm in the Ozarks (1994)
  - In the Land of the Big Red Apple (1995)
  - On the Other Side of the Hill (1995)
  - Little Town in the Ozarks (1996)
  - New Dawn on Rocky Ridge (1997)
  - On the Banks of the Bayou (1998)
  - Bachelor Girl (1999)
- A New Dawn for America: the Libertarian Challenge

Party political offices
Preceded by John Hospers	Libertarian nominee for President of the United States; 1976	Succeeded by Ed Clark
