= David Bergland =

American politician (1935–2019)

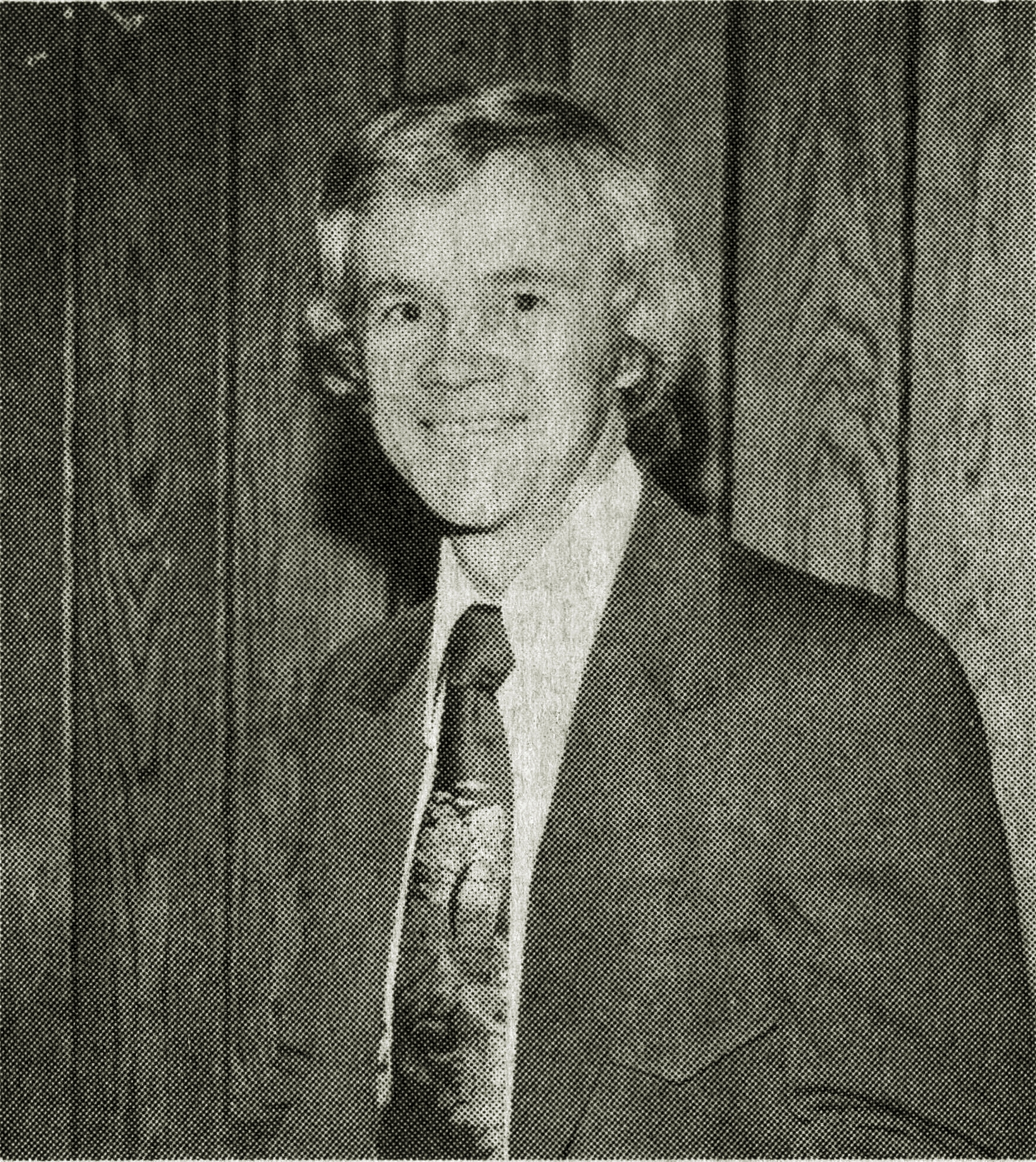
- Bergland in 1976

4th and 12th Chair of the Libertarian National Committee
- In office 1998–2000
- Preceded by: Steve Dasbach
- Succeeded by: Jim Lark
- In office 1977–1981
- Preceded by: Ed Crane
- Succeeded by: Alicia Clark

Personal details
- Born: David Peter Bergland; June 4, 1935 Mapleton, Iowa, U.S.
- Died: June 3, 2019 (aged 83) Kennewick, Washington, U.S.
- Party: Libertarian
- Spouse: Sharon Ayres
- Education: Long Beach City College; University of California, Los; Angeles; University of Southern California

David Peter Bergland (June 4, 1935 – June 3, 2019) was an American politician who was the United States Libertarian Party's nominee for President of the United States in the 1984 presidential election, and also served twice as the chair of the Libertarian National Committee.

== Background ==
Bergland was born June 4, 1935, in Mapleton, Iowa, the son of Gwendolyn (née McCalman) and Cedores P. Bergland.

== Political campaigns and activities ==
A resident of California and a lawyer, Bergland ran unsuccessfully for office several times, always as a Libertarian. In 1974, he ran as a write-in candidate for California Attorney General. In 1978, Bergland ran for the California state senate district 36, receiving 5.8% of the vote to finish third out of the three candidates on the ballot.

Bergland received the party's vice-presidential nomination in the 1976 presidential election, sharing the ticket with Roger MacBride. The MacBride/Bergland ticket received 172,553 votes (0.2%).

He served as the party's national chair from 1977 to 1981, and from 1998 to 2000.

In 1980, Bergland ran for the United States Senate, finishing third of five with 202,410 votes (2.4%).

Bergland received the Libertarian Party's presidential nomination in the 1984 presidential election. He and his running mate, Jim Lewis, received 228,111 votes (0.3%).

He managed the 2000 Libertarian presidential campaign of Harry Browne. Bergland endorsed the Free State Project in January 2006.

== Views ==
In the 1980s, Bergland wrote a book titled, Libertarianism in One Lesson (ISBN 0975432648). The book explained the libertarian philosophy and touched on issues including the government as a nature of coercion, how libertarianism developed in America and how it is different from both liberalism and conservatism, the contention that taxation is theft, support of a foreign policy of non-intervention, free trade with other countries, gun rights, and criminal justice reform, opposition to drug and alcohol prohibition, public education, and Social Security.

== Death ==
Bergland died on June 3, 2019, in Kennewick, Washington, one day short of his 84th birthday, of prostate cancer.

Party political offices
Preceded by Tonie Nathan	Libertarian nominee for Vice President of the United States; 1976	Succeeded by David Koch
Preceded by Ed Crane	Chair of the Libertarian National Committee; 1977–1981	Succeeded by Alicia Clark
Preceded by Ed Clark	Libertarian nominee for President of the United States; 1984	Succeeded by Ron Paul
Preceded by Steve Dasbach	Chair of the Libertarian National Committee; 1998–2000	Succeeded by Jim Lark
