= 1996 United States presidential election in Montana =

- November 5, 1996
- Turnout: 70.6% (▼8.3 pp)

| Nominee | Bob Dole | Bill Clinton | Ross Perot |
| Party | Republican | Democratic | Reform |
| Home state | Kansas | Arkansas | Texas |
| Running mate | Jack Kemp | Al Gore | James Campbell (Note: On the California, Indiana, Iowa, Kansas, Louisiana, Maine, Maryland, Missouri, Montana, Oregon, South Dakota, Tennessee, and Texas election ballots, James Campbell of California, Perot's former boss at IBM, was listed as a stand-in vice-presidential candidate until Perot decided on Pat Choate as his choice for Vice President.) |
| Electoral vote | 3 | 0 | 0 |
| Popular vote | 179,652 | 167,922 | 55,229 |
| Percentage | 44.11% | 41.23% | 13.56% |
County results
Dole
40–50%
50–60%
60–70%
70–80%
Clinton
40–50%
50–60%
60–70%
President before election
Bill Clinton
Democratic
Elected President
Bill Clinton
Democratic

The 1996 United States presidential election in Montana took place on November 5, 1996, as part of the 1996 United States presidential election. Voters chose three representatives, or electors to the Electoral College, who voted for president and vice president.

Montana voted for Senate Majority Leader Bob Dole over President Bill Clinton by a slim margin of 2.88%. Billionaire businessman Ross Perot (Reform Party of the United States of America-TX) finished in third, with 13.56% of the popular vote in Montana. As of the 2024 presidential election, this is the last election in which Sheridan County, Dawson County, and Mineral County voted for the Democratic candidate.

With 13.56% of the popular vote, Montana would prove to be Ross Perot's second strongest state in the 1996 election after Maine.

Montana was one of three states won by Clinton in 1992 that Bob Dole was able to flip, the others being Colorado and Georgia. This was also the first election since 1912 in which Montana voted differently than nearby California.

== Results ==
1996 United States presidential election in Montana
| Party | Candidate | Running mate | Votes | Percentage | Electoral votes |
|---|---|---|---|---|---|
| Republican | Bob Dole | Jack Kemp | 179,652 | 44.11% | 3 |
| Democratic | Bill Clinton (incumbent) | Al Gore (incumbent) | 167,922 | 41.23% | 0 |
| Reform | Ross Perot | James Campbell | 55,229 | 13.56% | 0 |
| Libertarian | Harry Browne | Jo Jorgensen | 2,526 | 0.62% | 0 |
| Natural Law (write in) | John Hagelin | Mike Tompkins | 1,754 | 0.43% | 0 |
| Constitutional (write in) | Howard Phillips | Herbert Titus | 152 | 0.04% | 0 |
| (write in) | Charles E. Collins | Rosemary Giumarra | 20 | 0.00% | 0 |
| Independent (write in) | Write-ins | | 5 | 0.00 | 0 |
| Socialist (write in) | Mary Cal Hollis | Eric Chester | 1 | 0.00 | 0 |

=== By county ===
| County | Bob Dole Republican | | Bill Clinton Democratic | | Various candidates Other parties | | Margin | | Total |
| County | # | % | # | % | # | % | # | % | Total |
|---|---|---|---|---|---|---|---|---|---|
| Beaverhead | 2,414 | 60.06% | 1,164 | 28.96% | 441 | 10.98% | 1,250 | 31.10% | 4,019 |
| Big Horn | 1,336 | 31.52% | 2,453 | 57.87% | 450 | 10.61% | -1,117 | -26.35% | 4,239 |
| Blaine | 1,127 | 38.96% | 1,316 | 45.49% | 450 | 15.55% | -189 | -6.53% | 2,893 |
| Broadwater | 1,029 | 52.34% | 603 | 30.67% | 334 | 16.99% | 426 | 21.67% | 1,966 |
| Carbon | 2,147 | 45.09% | 1,854 | 38.93% | 761 | 15.98% | 293 | 6.16% | 4,762 |
| Carter | 522 | 68.24% | 150 | 19.61% | 93 | 12.15% | 372 | 48.63% | 765 |
| Cascade | 14,291 | 40.82% | 15,707 | 44.87% | 5,008 | 14.31% | -1,416 | -4.05% | 35,006 |
| Chouteau | 1,660 | 52.58% | 1,039 | 32.91% | 458 | 14.51% | 621 | 19.67% | 3,157 |
| Custer | 2,467 | 46.29% | 2,115 | 39.69% | 747 | 14.02% | 352 | 6.60% | 5,329 |
| Daniels | 558 | 42.53% | 510 | 38.87% | 244 | 18.60% | 48 | 3.66% | 1,312 |
| Dawson | 1,890 | 40.45% | 1,903 | 40.72% | 880 | 18.83% | -13 | -0.27% | 4,673 |
| Deer Lodge | 883 | 17.62% | 3,331 | 66.49% | 796 | 15.89% | -2,448 | -48.87% | 5,010 |
| Fallon | 778 | 51.32% | 452 | 29.82% | 286 | 18.86% | 326 | 21.50% | 1,516 |
| Fergus | 3,671 | 59.27% | 1,866 | 30.13% | 657 | 10.60% | 1,805 | 29.14% | 6,194 |
| Flathead | 16,542 | 51.33% | 10,452 | 32.43% | 5,231 | 16.24% | 6,090 | 18.90% | 32,225 |
| Gallatin | 14,559 | 50.07% | 10,972 | 37.73% | 3,547 | 12.20% | 3,587 | 12.34% | 29,078 |
| Garfield | 562 | 75.34% | 107 | 14.34% | 77 | 10.32% | 455 | 61.00% | 746 |
| Glacier | 1,270 | 31.01% | 2,292 | 55.97% | 533 | 13.02% | -1,022 | -24.96% | 4,095 |
| Golden Valley | 284 | 58.20% | 128 | 26.23% | 76 | 15.57% | 156 | 31.97% | 488 |
| Granite | 733 | 52.10% | 429 | 30.49% | 245 | 17.41% | 304 | 21.61% | 1,407 |
| Hill | 2,601 | 36.58% | 3,517 | 49.46% | 993 | 13.96% | -916 | -12.88% | 7,111 |
| Jefferson | 2,248 | 46.82% | 1,775 | 36.97% | 778 | 16.21% | 473 | 9.85% | 4,801 |
| Judith Basin | 753 | 56.28% | 452 | 33.78% | 133 | 9.94% | 301 | 22.50% | 1,338 |
| Lake | 4,723 | 43.57% | 4,195 | 38.70% | 1,922 | 17.73% | 528 | 4.87% | 10,840 |
| Lewis and Clark | 11,665 | 43.94% | 11,535 | 43.45% | 3,347 | 12.61% | 130 | 0.49% | 26,547 |
| Liberty | 634 | 54.56% | 379 | 32.62% | 149 | 12.82% | 255 | 21.94% | 1,162 |
| Lincoln | 3,552 | 45.16% | 2,705 | 34.39% | 1,609 | 20.45% | 847 | 10.77% | 7,866 |
| Madison | 1,984 | 56.77% | 955 | 27.32% | 556 | 15.91% | 1,029 | 29.45% | 3,495 |
| McCone | 615 | 48.96% | 390 | 31.05% | 251 | 19.99% | 225 | 17.91% | 1,256 |
| Meagher | 505 | 53.95% | 281 | 30.02% | 150 | 16.03% | 224 | 23.93% | 936 |
| Mineral | 549 | 33.99% | 658 | 40.74% | 408 | 25.27% | -109 | -6.75% | 1,615 |
| Missoula | 16,034 | 36.13% | 21,874 | 49.29% | 6,474 | 14.58% | -5,840 | -13.16% | 44,382 |
| Musselshell | 1,121 | 54.00% | 652 | 31.41% | 303 | 14.59% | 469 | 22.59% | 2,076 |
| Park | 3,837 | 51.52% | 2,564 | 34.43% | 1,047 | 14.05% | 1,273 | 17.09% | 7,448 |
| Petroleum | 186 | 64.14% | 62 | 21.38% | 42 | 14.48% | 124 | 42.76% | 290 |
| Phillips | 1,392 | 55.44% | 705 | 28.08% | 414 | 16.48% | 687 | 27.36% | 2,511 |
| Pondera | 1,438 | 48.53% | 1,123 | 37.90% | 402 | 13.57% | 315 | 10.63% | 2,963 |
| Powder River | 663 | 63.44% | 236 | 22.58% | 146 | 13.98% | 427 | 40.86% | 1,045 |
| Powell | 1,274 | 45.47% | 952 | 33.98% | 576 | 20.55% | 322 | 11.49% | 2,802 |
| Prairie | 417 | 53.46% | 259 | 33.21% | 104 | 13.33% | 158 | 20.25% | 780 |
| Ravalli | 8,138 | 50.11% | 5,200 | 32.02% | 2,902 | 17.87% | 2,938 | 18.09% | 16,240 |
| Richland | 2,021 | 44.24% | 1,614 | 35.33% | 933 | 20.43% | 407 | 8.91% | 4,568 |
| Roosevelt | 1,209 | 30.25% | 2,118 | 52.99% | 670 | 16.76% | -909 | -22.74% | 3,997 |
| Rosebud | 1,413 | 38.37% | 1,681 | 45.64% | 589 | 15.99% | -268 | -7.27% | 3,683 |
| Sanders | 2,043 | 43.83% | 1,573 | 33.75% | 1,045 | 22.42% | 470 | 10.08% | 4,661 |
| Sheridan | 832 | 34.17% | 1,187 | 48.75% | 416 | 17.08% | -355 | -14.58% | 2,435 |
| Silver Bow | 3,909 | 22.11% | 11,199 | 63.35% | 2,569 | 14.54% | -7,290 | -41.24% | 17,677 |
| Stillwater | 1,871 | 49.24% | 1,282 | 33.74% | 647 | 17.02% | 589 | 15.50% | 3,800 |
| Sweet Grass | 1,109 | 62.23% | 469 | 26.32% | 204 | 11.45% | 640 | 35.91% | 1,782 |
| Teton | 1,701 | 51.14% | 1,188 | 35.72% | 437 | 13.14% | 513 | 15.42% | 3,326 |
| Toole | 1,203 | 48.47% | 874 | 35.21% | 405 | 16.32% | 329 | 13.26% | 2,482 |
| Treasure | 237 | 47.59% | 171 | 34.34% | 90 | 18.07% | 66 | 13.25% | 498 |
| Valley | 1,838 | 43.69% | 1,674 | 39.79% | 695 | 16.52% | 164 | 3.90% | 4,207 |
| Wheatland | 563 | 51.75% | 391 | 35.94% | 134 | 12.31% | 172 | 15.81% | 1,088 |
| Wibaux | 284 | 46.33% | 197 | 32.14% | 132 | 21.53% | 87 | 14.19% | 613 |
| Yellowstone | 26,367 | 47.18% | 22,992 | 41.14% | 6,523 | 11.68% | 3,375 | 6.04% | 55,882 |
| Totals | 179,652 | 44.11% | 167,922 | 41.23% | 59,687 | 14.66% | 11,730 | 2.88% | 407,261 |

Counties that flipped from Democratic to Republican

- Lake
- Lewis and Clark
- Sanders
- Valley

=== By congressional district ===
Due to the state's low population, only one congressional district is allocated. This district is an at-large district (it covers the entire state), and thus is equivalent to the statewide election results.

| District | Dole | Clinton | Representative |
|---|---|---|---|
| At-large | 44.11% | 41.23% | Rick Hill |

== See also ==
- United States presidential elections in Montana
- Presidency of Bill Clinton
