= 1996 United States presidential election in Kansas =

- November 5, 1996

Nominee	Bob Dole	Bill Clinton	Ross Perot
Party	Republican	Democratic	Reform
Home state	Kansas	Arkansas	Texas
Running mate	Jack Kemp	Al Gore	James Campbell (Note: On the California, Indiana, Iowa, Kansas, Louisiana, Maine, Maryland, Missouri, Montana, Oregon, South Dakota, Tennessee, and Texas election ballots, James Campbell of California, Perot's former boss at IBM, was listed as a stand-in vice-presidential candidate until Perot decided on Pat Choate as his choice for Vice President.)
Electoral vote	6	0	0
Popular vote	583,245	387,659	92,639
Percentage	54.29%	36.08%	8.62%

Dole
40–50%
50–60%
60–70%
70–80%
Clinton
40–50%
60–70%
President before election
Bill Clinton
Democratic
Elected President
Bill Clinton
Democratic

The 1996 United States presidential election in Kansas took place on November 5, 1996, as part of the 1996 United States presidential election. Voters chose six representatives, or electors to the Electoral College, who voted for president and vice president.

Kansas was won by former home state Senator Bob Dole (R-KS) over President Bill Clinton (D), with Dole winning 54.29 percent to 36.08 percent for a margin of 18.21 points. Billionaire businessman Ross Perot (Reform Party of the United States of America-TX) finished in third, with 8.62 percent of the popular vote, a sharp decline from 1992, when Perot captured 27% of the state's votes and helped hold George H.W. Bush’s victory margin to just over five percentage points. As of the 2024 presidential election, this is the last election in which Atchison County voted for a Democratic presidential candidate. Clinton became the first Democrat to win the White House without carrying Ellis County since Franklin D. Roosevelt in 1944.

Dole won 78.98% of the vote in Russell County, his boyhood home and base when he represented the state's 1st congressional district from 1961 to 1969. The only other county in the country which gave him a higher percentage was Ochiltree County, Texas, with 79.20%.

With 54.29 percent of the popular vote, Kansas proved to be Dole's second-strongest state in the election after Utah. However, it shifted rightward from 1992 by 13.1 percentage points, the largest such shift in Dole's favor. As of the 2024 election, this marks the only occasion since 1984 in which a Republican nominee for President won his state of birth.

== Results ==
1996 United States presidential election in Kansas
Party	Candidate	Running mate	Votes	Percentage	Electoral votes
Republican	Bob Dole	Jack Kemp	583,245	54.29%	6
Democratic	Bill Clinton (incumbent)	Al Gore (incumbent)	387,659	36.08%	0
Reform	Ross Perot	James Campbell	92,639	8.62%	0
Libertarian	Harry Browne	Jo Jorgensen	4,557	0.42%	0
Independent	Howard Phillips	Herbert Titus	3,519	0.33%	0
Independent	Dr. John Hagelin	Dr. V. Tompkins	1,655	0.15%	0
Write-in	Ralph Nader	Winona LaDuke	914	0.09%	0
Write-in	Charles Collins	Rosemary Giumarra	112	0.01%	0

=== Results by county ===
County	Bob Dole Republican		Bill Clinton Democratic		Ross Perot Reform		Various candidates Other parties		Margin		Total votes cast
County	#	%	#	%	#	%	#	%	#	%	Total votes cast
Allen	2,797	47.06%	2,299	38.68%	793	13.34%	54	0.91%	498	8.38%	5,943
Anderson	1,636	46.66%	1,367	38.99%	449	12.81%	54	1.54%	269	7.67%	3,506
Atchison	2,828	43.25%	2,926	44.75%	727	11.12%	57	0.87%	-98	-1.50%	6,538
Barber	1,696	62.15%	730	26.75%	279	10.22%	24	0.88%	966	35.40%	2,729
Barton	7,855	64.92%	3,121	25.80%	1,004	8.30%	119	0.98%	4,734	39.12%	12,099
Bourbon	3,318	50.17%	2,491	37.66%	760	11.49%	45	0.68%	827	12.51%	6,614
Brown	2,688	56.58%	1,529	32.18%	497	10.46%	37	0.78%	1,159	24.40%	4,751
Butler	13,979	58.70%	7,294	30.63%	2,274	9.55%	269	1.13%	6,685	28.07%	23,816
Chase	778	50.19%	496	32.00%	259	16.71%	17	1.10%	282	18.19%	1,550
Chautauqua	1,142	58.27%	568	28.98%	222	11.33%	28	1.43%	574	29.29%	1,960
Cherokee	4,138	45.76%	3,771	41.70%	1,072	11.85%	62	0.69%	367	4.06%	9,043
Cheyenne	1,211	66.83%	422	23.29%	174	9.60%	5	0.28%	789	43.54%	1,812
Clark	855	65.02%	334	25.40%	109	8.29%	17	1.29%	521	39.62%	1,315
Clay	2,793	66.87%	963	23.05%	389	9.31%	32	0.77%	1,830	43.82%	4,177
Cloud	2,743	54.66%	1,615	32.18%	609	12.14%	51	1.02%	1,128	22.48%	5,018
Coffey	2,369	57.92%	1,118	27.33%	572	13.99%	31	0.76%	1,251	30.59%	4,090
Comanche	691	61.31%	298	26.44%	133	11.80%	5	0.44%	393	34.87%	1,127
Cowley	7,872	50.79%	5,588	36.05%	1,904	12.28%	135	0.87%	2,284	14.74%	15,499
Crawford	6,447	40.60%	7,504	47.25%	1,785	11.24%	144	0.91%	-1,057	-6.65%	15,880
Decatur	1,255	68.06%	417	22.61%	156	8.46%	16	0.87%	838	45.45%	1,844
Dickinson	5,174	60.53%	2,423	28.35%	888	10.39%	63	0.74%	2,751	32.18%	8,548
Doniphan	1,962	64.24%	1,050	34.38%	0	0.00%	42	1.38%	912	29.86%	3,054
Douglas	16,116	42.63%	18,116	47.93%	2,630	6.96%	938	2.48%	-2,000	-5.30%	37,800
Edwards	1,088	59.94%	539	29.70%	180	9.92%	8	0.44%	549	30.24%	1,815
Elk	933	56.79%	488	29.70%	206	12.54%	16	0.97%	445	27.09%	1,643
Ellis	6,809	56.97%	4,142	34.66%	894	7.48%	107	0.90%	2,667	22.31%	11,952
Ellsworth	2,078	64.14%	899	27.75%	245	7.56%	18	0.56%	1,179	36.39%	3,240
Finney	6,188	65.43%	2,420	25.59%	805	8.51%	44	0.47%	3,768	39.84%	9,457
Ford	5,681	61.30%	2,628	28.36%	914	9.86%	44	0.47%	3,053	32.94%	9,267
Franklin	5,007	50.91%	3,552	36.12%	1,184	12.04%	92	0.94%	1,455	14.79%	9,835
Geary	3,686	54.29%	2,444	35.99%	618	9.10%	42	0.62%	1,242	18.30%	6,790
Gove	1,123	69.19%	351	21.63%	141	8.69%	8	0.49%	772	47.56%	1,623
Graham	1,031	63.41%	432	26.57%	152	9.35%	11	0.68%	599	36.84%	1,626
Grant	1,772	66.52%	633	23.76%	250	9.38%	9	0.34%	1,139	42.76%	2,664
Gray	1,457	71.53%	404	19.83%	164	8.05%	12	0.59%	1,053	51.70%	2,037
Greeley	567	71.95%	161	20.43%	47	5.96%	13	1.65%	406	51.52%	788
Greenwood	1,932	53.15%	1,108	30.48%	552	15.19%	43	1.18%	824	22.67%	3,635
Hamilton	811	64.93%	342	27.38%	84	6.73%	12	0.96%	469	37.55%	1,249
Harper	1,941	61.44%	836	26.46%	355	11.24%	27	0.85%	1,105	34.98%	3,159
Harvey	8,382	57.79%	4,918	33.91%	1,023	7.05%	181	1.25%	3,464	23.88%	14,504
Haskell	1,143	73.55%	304	19.56%	96	6.18%	11	0.71%	839	53.99%	1,554
Hodgeman	808	69.42%	251	21.56%	99	8.51%	6	0.52%	557	47.86%	1,164
Jackson	2,682	49.12%	1,983	36.32%	735	13.46%	60	1.10%	699	12.80%	5,460
Jefferson	3,781	49.31%	2,757	35.95%	1,030	13.43%	100	1.30%	1,024	13.36%	7,668
Jewell	1,374	69.01%	417	20.94%	188	9.44%	12	0.60%	957	48.07%	1,991
Johnson	110,368	57.82%	68,129	35.69%	10,425	5.46%	1,972	1.03%	42,239	22.13%	190,894
Kearny	1,041	70.05%	335	22.54%	106	7.13%	4	0.27%	706	47.51%	1,486
Kingman	2,659	64.65%	1,006	24.46%	409	9.94%	39	0.95%	1,653	40.19%	4,113
Kiowa	1,264	70.97%	331	18.59%	170	9.55%	16	0.90%	933	52.38%	1,781
Labette	4,283	45.66%	3,931	41.91%	1,091	11.63%	75	0.80%	352	3.75%	9,380
Lane	865	70.67%	271	22.14%	86	7.03%	2	0.16%	594	48.53%	1,224
Leavenworth	10,778	47.90%	9,098	40.44%	2,419	10.75%	205	0.91%	1,680	7.46%	22,500
Lincoln	1,372	64.47%	528	24.81%	212	9.96%	16	0.75%	844	39.66%	2,128
Linn	2,077	49.04%	1,590	37.54%	535	12.63%	33	0.78%	487	11.50%	4,235
Logan	1,155	73.47%	296	18.83%	112	7.12%	9	0.57%	859	54.64%	1,572
Lyon	6,612	50.01%	4,884	36.94%	1,584	11.98%	141	1.07%	1,728	13.07%	13,221
McPherson	8,142	63.20%	3,536	27.45%	1,115	8.65%	90	0.70%	4,606	35.75%	12,883
Marion	4,173	65.32%	1,673	26.19%	492	7.70%	51	0.80%	2,500	39.13%	6,389
Marshall	2,811	51.11%	1,932	35.13%	713	12.96%	44	0.80%	879	15.98%	5,500
Meade	1,443	70.08%	426	20.69%	173	8.40%	17	0.83%	1,017	49.39%	2,059
Miami	5,256	47.98%	4,237	38.68%	1,339	12.22%	123	1.12%	1,019	9.30%	10,955
Mitchell	2,435	68.71%	833	23.50%	246	6.94%	30	0.85%	1,602	45.21%	3,544
Montgomery	7,428	51.71%	5,269	36.68%	1,528	10.64%	140	0.97%	2,159	15.03%	14,365
Morris	1,553	51.96%	965	32.29%	451	15.09%	20	0.67%	588	19.67%	2,989
Morton	1,073	67.87%	376	23.78%	124	7.84%	8	0.51%	697	44.09%	1,581
Nemaha	3,014	56.07%	1,648	30.66%	676	12.58%	37	0.69%	1,366	25.41%	5,375
Neosho	3,409	49.43%	2,527	36.64%	907	13.15%	54	0.78%	882	12.79%	6,897
Ness	1,336	68.16%	428	21.84%	186	9.49%	10	0.51%	908	46.32%	1,960
Norton	1,814	66.42%	640	23.43%	265	9.70%	12	0.44%	1,174	42.99%	2,731
Osage	3,487	48.80%	2,502	35.01%	1,101	15.41%	56	0.78%	985	13.79%	7,146
Osborne	1,582	66.14%	608	25.42%	191	7.98%	11	0.46%	974	40.72%	2,392
Ottawa	1,846	63.88%	752	26.02%	261	9.03%	31	1.07%	1,094	37.86%	2,890
Pawnee	1,927	61.10%	932	29.55%	275	8.72%	20	0.63%	995	31.55%	3,154
Phillips	2,005	66.30%	758	25.07%	242	8.00%	19	0.63%	1,247	41.23%	3,024
Pottawatomie	4,504	58.16%	1,997	25.79%	1,035	13.37%	208	2.69%	2,507	32.37%	7,744
Pratt	2,591	58.87%	1,367	31.06%	408	9.27%	35	0.80%	1,224	27.81%	4,401
Rawlins	1,393	73.78%	335	17.74%	146	7.73%	14	0.74%	1,058	56.04%	1,888
Reno	14,275	54.28%	9,108	34.63%	2,661	10.12%	256	0.97%	5,167	19.65%	26,300
Republic	2,283	69.97%	688	21.08%	268	8.21%	24	0.74%	1,595	48.89%	3,263
Rice	2,842	59.34%	1,434	29.94%	482	10.06%	31	0.65%	1,408	29.40%	4,789
Riley	11,113	56.68%	6,746	34.41%	1,478	7.54%	270	1.38%	4,367	22.27%	19,607
Rooks	1,864	66.88%	650	23.32%	251	9.01%	22	0.79%	1,214	43.56%	2,787
Rush	1,239	62.29%	547	27.50%	185	9.30%	18	0.90%	692	34.79%	1,989
Russell	3,347	78.98%	705	16.64%	164	3.87%	22	0.52%	2,642	62.34%	4,238
Saline	12,475	55.34%	7,728	34.28%	2,192	9.72%	146	0.65%	4,747	21.06%	22,541
Scott	1,750	73.41%	458	19.21%	160	6.71%	16	0.67%	1,292	54.20%	2,384
Sedgwick	93,397	56.06%	59,643	35.80%	11,875	7.13%	1,684	1.01%	33,754	20.26%	166,599
Seward	3,812	68.40%	1,309	23.49%	396	7.11%	56	1.00%	2,503	44.91%	5,573
Shawnee	34,845	46.05%	32,803	43.35%	7,304	9.65%	711	0.94%	2,042	2.70%	75,663
Sheridan	1,053	74.15%	264	18.59%	95	6.69%	8	0.56%	789	55.56%	1,420
Sherman	2,110	68.42%	736	23.87%	220	7.13%	18	0.58%	1,374	44.55%	3,084
Smith	1,628	65.38%	638	25.62%	213	8.55%	11	0.44%	990	39.76%	2,490
Stafford	1,604	63.03%	651	25.58%	276	10.84%	14	0.55%	953	37.45%	2,545
Stanton	628	71.20%	189	21.43%	60	6.80%	5	0.57%	439	49.77%	882
Stevens	1,548	70.88%	405	18.54%	213	9.75%	18	0.82%	1,143	52.34%	2,184
Sumner	5,952	54.22%	3,638	33.14%	1,260	11.48%	127	1.16%	2,314	21.08%	10,977
Thomas	2,725	69.75%	866	22.17%	295	7.55%	21	0.54%	1,859	47.58%	3,907
Trego	1,205	61.11%	548	27.79%	209	10.60%	10	0.51%	657	33.32%	1,972
Wabaunsee	1,884	55.67%	966	28.55%	479	14.15%	55	1.63%	918	27.12%	3,384
Wallace	738	76.24%	160	16.53%	65	6.71%	5	0.52%	578	59.71%	968
Washington	2,397	67.39%	804	22.60%	326	9.17%	30	0.84%	1,593	44.79%	3,557
Wichita	796	71.13%	239	21.36%	80	7.15%	4	0.36%	557	49.77%	1,119
Wilson	2,458	56.41%	1,297	29.77%	562	12.90%	40	0.92%	1,161	26.64%	4,357
Woodson	953	52.02%	598	32.64%	269	14.68%	12	0.66%	355	19.38%	1,832
Wyandotte	14,011	28.22%	31,252	62.94%	3,931	7.92%	460	0.93%	-17,241	-34.72%	49,654
Totals	583,245	54.29%	387,659	36.08%	92,639	8.62%	10,757	1.00%	195,586	18.21%	1,074,300

==== Counties that flipped from Democratic to Republican ====
- Cherokee (largest city: Baxter Springs)
- Ellis (largest city: Hays)
- Labette (largest city: Parsons)
- Leavenworth (largest city: Leavenworth)
- Miami (largest city: Paola)
- Shawnee (largest city: Topeka)

==== Counties that flipped from Independent to Republican ====
- Anderson (largest city: Garnett)
- Jefferson (largest city: Valley Falls)
- Morris (tied in 1992) (largest city: Council Grove)
- Wabaunsee (largest city: Alma)

=== By congressional district ===
Dole won all four congressional districts.

District	Dole	Clinton	Perot	Representative
1st	62%	28%	9%	Pat Roberts (104th Congress)
1st	62%	28%	9%	Jerry Moran (105th Congress)
2nd	49%	39%	11%	Sam Brownback (104th Congress)
2nd	49%	39%	11%	Jim Ryun (105th Congress)
3rd	50%	42%	6%	Jan Meyers (104th Congress)
3rd	50%	42%	6%	Vince Snowbarger (105th Congress)
4th	56%	35%	8%	Todd Tiahrt

== See also ==
- United States presidential elections in Kansas
- Presidency of Bill Clinton
