= 1996 United States presidential election in Tennessee =

- November 5, 1996
- Turnout: 62.77%

Nominee	Bill Clinton	Bob Dole	Ross Perot
Party	Democratic	Republican	Independent
Alliance			Reform
Home state	Arkansas	Kansas	Texas
Running mate	Al Gore	Jack Kemp	James Campbell (Note: On the California, Indiana, Iowa, Kansas, Louisiana, Maine, Maryland, Missouri, Montana, Oregon, South Dakota, Tennessee, and Texas election ballots, James Campbell of California, Perot's former boss at IBM, was listed as a stand-in vice-presidential candidate until Perot decided on Pat Choate as his choice for Vice President.)
Electoral vote	11	0	0
Popular vote	909,146	863,530	105,918
Percentage	48.00%	45.59%	5.59%

Clinton
40–50%
50–60%
60–70%
Dole
40–50%
50–60%
60–70%
President before election
Bill Clinton
Democratic
Elected President
Bill Clinton
Democratic

The 1996 United States presidential election in Tennessee took place on November 5, 1996. All 50 states and the District of Columbia, were part of the 1996 United States presidential election. Tennessee voters chose 11 electors to the Electoral College, which selected the president and vice president. Tennessee was won by incumbent United States President Bill Clinton of Arkansas, who was running against Kansas Senator Bob Dole. Clinton ran a second time with former Tennessee Senator Al Gore as vice president, and Dole ran with former New York Congressman Jack Kemp.

Tennessee weighed in for this election as 6.01 points more Republican than the national average. As of the 2024 presidential election, this is the last time that the Democratic nominee carried Tennessee, as well as Montgomery County, Maury County, Carroll County, Weakley County, Obion County, McNairy County, Anderson County, Coffee County, Polk County, Putnam County, Sequatchie County, Morgan County, Fayette County, Cheatham County, Roane County, Lawrence County, Dyer County, Union County, Fentress County, Meigs County, and Moore County.

The presidential election of 1996 was a very multi-partisan election for Tennessee, with nearly seven percent of the electorate voting for third-party candidates. Most counties in Tennessee turned out for Clinton, including the highly populated Shelby County and Davidson County, by narrow margins. Both Shelby and Davidson counties have voted consistently Democratic since the prior election. In his second bid for the presidency, Reform Party candidate Ross Perot received over five percent of the votes in Tennessee, as part of the strongest national third-party presidential campaign in recent history. Tennessee nonetheless showed Perot his worst performance out of any state.

== Primary elections ==
=== Democratic primary ===
1996 Tennessee Democratic presidential primary
- March 12, 1996

75 delegates (67 pledged and 8 unpledged) to the Democratic National Convention

Candidate	Bill Clinton	Uncommitted
Home state	Arkansas	–
Delegate count	67	0
Popular vote	122,538	15,144
Percentage	88.93%	10.99%
- County results Clinton: 65–70% 70–75% 75–80% 80–85% 85–90% 90–95% 95–100%

The Tennessee Democratic primary was held on March 12, 1996. Incumbent President Bill Clinton won the primary in a landslide, receiving 122,538 votes (88.9%) and effectively securing all 67 pledged delegates. The uncommitted option received 15,144 votes (11%) and did not earn any delegates. Clinton earned all 67 pledged delegates. Tennessee also had 8 unpledged party leader and elected official delegates (Superdelegates).

1996 Tennessee Democratic Primary
Candidate	Votes	%	Delegates
Bill Clinton	122,538	88.93%	67
Uncommitted	15,144	10.99%	0
Scattered	115	0.08%	0
Total	137,797	100.00%	75

=== Republican primary ===
Republican primary county results Dole: 40–50% 50–60% 60–70% Buchanan: 30–40% Alexander: 40–50%

The Tennessee Republican primary was held on March 12, 1996. Senator Bob Dole comfortably won the state, earning all 37 delegates.

Dole's victory in Tennessee contributed to a series of wins across several Super Tuesday states that consolidated his position as the front-runner for the Republican nomination.

Although Lamar Alexander had been viewed as a potential favorite-son candidate in Tennessee, he suspended his campaign shortly before the primary and endorsed Dole.

1996 Tennessee Republican Presidential Primary
Candidate	Votes	%	Delegates
Bob Dole	148,063	51.16%	37
Pat Buchanan	72,928	25.20%	0
Lamar Alexander (withdrawn)	32,742	11.31%	0
Steve Forbes	22,171	7.66%	0
Alan Keyes	7,661	2.65%	0
Uncommitted	3,078	1.06%	0
Bob Dornan	898	0.31%	0
Phil Gramm (withdrawn)	688	0.24%	0
Richard Lugar (withdrawn)	531	0.18%	0
Write-ins	416	0.14%	0
Morry Taylor (withdrawn)	210	0.07%	0
Total	289,386	100.00%	37

== General election ==
1996 United States presidential election in Tennessee
Party	Candidate	Votes	Percentage	Electoral votes
Democratic	Bill Clinton (incumbent)	909,146	48.00%	11
Republican	Bob Dole	863,530	45.59%	0
Independent	Ross Perot	105,918	5.59%	0
Independent	Ralph Nader	6,427	0.34%	0
Independent	Harry Browne	5,020	0.27%	0
Independent	Howard Phillips	1,818	0.10%	0
Independent	Charles E. Collins	688	0.04%	0
Independent	Dr. John Hagelin	636 (Note: Votes for this candidate were not tabulated by county but listed only as a statewide total.)	0.03%	0
Independent	Steve Michael	408	0.02%	0
Independent	Earl Dodge	324	0.02%	0
Write-ins		190	0.01%	0
Totals		1,894,105	100.00%	11
Voter Turnout (Voting age/Registered)				

=== Results by county ===
County	Bill Clinton Democratic		Bob Dole Republican		Ross Perot Independent		Various candidates Other parties		Margin		Total votes cast
County	#	%	#	%	#	%	#	%	#	%	Total votes cast
Anderson	13,457	48.91%	11,943	43.40%	1,817	6.60%	299	1.09%	1,514	5.51%	27,516
Bedford	5,735	50.82%	4,634	41.07%	823	7.29%	92	0.82%	1,101	9.75%	11,284
Benton	4,341	58.27%	2,395	32.15%	663	8.90%	51	0.68%	1,946	26.12%	7,450
Bledsoe	1,621	45.89%	1,626	46.04%	251	7.11%	34	0.96%	-5	-0.15%	3,532
Blount	14,687	39.77%	19,310	52.29%	2,556	6.92%	377	1.02%	-4,623	-12.52%	36,930
Bradley	9,095	34.16%	15,478	58.13%	1,856	6.97%	199	0.75%	-6,383	-23.97%	26,628
Campbell	6,122	53.77%	4,393	38.59%	785	6.90%	85	0.75%	1,729	15.18%	11,385
Cannon	2,318	55.39%	1,468	35.08%	361	8.63%	38	0.91%	850	20.31%	4,185
Carroll	4,912	49.87%	4,206	42.70%	697	7.08%	34	0.35%	706	7.17%	9,849
Carter	6,218	34.01%	10,540	57.65%	1,383	7.56%	141	0.77%	-4,322	-23.64%	18,282
Cheatham	4,883	49.01%	4,283	42.98%	705	7.08%	93	0.93%	600	6.03%	9,964
Chester	1,922	39.22%	2,746	56.03%	203	4.14%	30	0.61%	-824	-16.81%	4,901
Claiborne	3,861	44.49%	4,023	46.35%	727	8.38%	68	0.78%	-162	-1.86%	8,679
Clay	1,559	51.86%	1,108	36.86%	316	10.51%	23	0.77%	451	15.00%	3,006
Cocke	3,326	38.27%	4,481	51.56%	798	9.18%	86	0.99%	-1,155	-13.29%	8,691
Coffee	7,951	48.78%	7,038	43.18%	1,205	7.39%	107	0.66%	913	5.60%	16,301
Crockett	2,256	51.96%	1,872	43.11%	201	4.63%	13	0.30%	384	8.85%	4,342
Cumberland	6,676	40.84%	8,096	49.53%	1,399	8.56%	176	1.08%	-1,420	-8.69%	16,347
Davidson	110,805	55.30%	78,453	39.15%	9,018	4.50%	2,106	1.05%	32,352	16.15%	200,382
Decatur	2,262	53.55%	1,712	40.53%	229	5.42%	51	0.96%	550	13.02%	4,254
DeKalb	3,213	60.60%	1,696	31.99%	342	6.45%	21	0.50%	1,517	28.61%	5,272
Dickson	7,458	53.93%	5,283	38.20%	996	7.20%	92	0.67%	2,175	15.73%	13,829
Dyer	5,602	49.25%	5,059	44.48%	676	5.94%	37	0.33%	543	4.77%	11,374
Fayette	4,655	48.90%	4,406	46.29%	416	4.37%	42	0.44%	249	2.61%	9,519
Fentress	2,332	46.12%	2,307	45.63%	386	7.63%	31	0.61%	25	0.49%	5,056
Franklin	6,929	51.79%	5,296	39.58%	1,057	7.90%	97	0.73%	1,633	12.21%	13,379
Gibson	8,851	53.88%	6,614	40.26%	891	5.42%	72	0.44%	2,237	13.62%	16,428
Giles	4,948	54.80%	3,269	36.20%	733	8.12%	80	0.89%	1,679	18.60%	9,030
Grainger	2,162	39.65%	2,875	52.72%	382	7.01%	34	0.62%	-713	-13.07%	5,453
Greene	6,885	37.39%	9,779	53.10%	1,604	8.71%	148	0.80%	-2,894	-15.71%	18,416
Grundy	2,596	64.15%	1,094	27.03%	326	8.06%	31	0.77%	1,502	37.12%	4,047
Hamblen	7,006	38.71%	9,797	54.13%	1,106	6.11%	190	1.05%	-2,791	-15.42%	18,099
Hamilton	48,008	43.55%	55,205	50.08%	6,699	6.08%	325	0.29%	-7,197	-6.53%	110,237
Hancock	760	35.28%	1,259	58.45%	116	5.39%	19	0.88%	-499	-23.17%	2,154
Hardeman	4,859	59.03%	2,961	35.97%	346	4.20%	65	0.79%	1,898	23.06%	8,231
Hardin	3,508	43.22%	3,980	49.03%	594	7.32%	35	0.43%	-472	-5.81%	8,117
Hawkins	6,367	39.94%	8,164	51.21%	1,282	8.04%	128	0.80%	-1,797	-11.27%	15,941
Haywood	3,565	59.12%	2,293	38.03%	154	2.55%	18	0.30%	1,272	21.09%	6,030
Henderson	2,841	39.01%	4,002	54.96%	408	5.60%	31	0.43%	-1,161	-15.95%	7,282
Henry	6,153	53.50%	4,272	37.14%	992	8.63%	84	0.73%	1,881	16.36%	11,501
Hickman	3,917	61.03%	2,002	31.19%	460	7.17%	39	0.61%	1,915	29.84%	6,418
Houston	1,868	66.31%	742	26.34%	182	6.46%	25	0.89%	1,126	39.97%	2,817
Humphreys	3,675	61.05%	1,892	31.43%	423	7.03%	30	0.50%	1,783	29.62%	6,020
Jackson	2,889	69.43%	944	22.69%	289	6.95%	39	0.94%	1,945	46.74%	4,161
Jefferson	4,688	38.57%	6,446	53.03%	882	7.26%	139	1.14%	-1,758	-14.46%	12,155
Johnson	1,698	31.69%	3,137	58.54%	489	9.12%	35	0.65%	-1,439	-26.85%	5,359
Knox	61,158	43.67%	70,761	50.53%	6,402	4.57%	1,724	1.23%	-9,603	-6.86%	140,045
Lake	1,273	64.23%	589	29.72%	110	5.55%	10	0.50%	684	34.51%	1,982
Lauderdale	4,349	60.71%	2,481	34.63%	308	4.30%	26	0.36%	1,868	26.08%	7,164
Lawrence	6,188	46.32%	6,115	45.77%	973	7.28%	83	0.62%	73	0.55%	13,359
Lewis	1,971	54.78%	1,298	36.08%	316	8.78%	13	0.36%	673	18.70%	3,598
Lincoln	4,361	44.74%	4,551	46.69%	761	7.81%	74	0.76%	-190	-1.95%	9,747
Loudon	5,552	40.43%	7,098	51.69%	889	6.47%	192	1.40%	-1,546	-11.26%	13,731
Macon	2,240	43.36%	2,481	48.03%	421	8.15%	24	0.46%	-241	-4.67%	5,166
Madison	13,577	45.92%	14,908	50.42%	968	3.27%	112	0.38%	-1,331	-4.50%	29,565
Marion	5,194	56.51%	3,166	34.45%	768	8.36%	63	0.69%	2,028	22.06%	9,191
Marshall	4,447	56.20%	2,781	35.14%	603	7.62%	82	1.04%	1,666	21.06%	7,913
Maury	10,367	50.39%	8,737	42.47%	1,366	6.64%	104	0.51%	1,630	7.92%	20,574
McMinn	5,987	40.50%	7,655	51.78%	1,033	6.99%	109	0.74%	-1,668	-11.28%	14,784
McNairy	4,050	47.22%	3,960	46.18%	519	6.05%	47	0.55%	90	1.04%	8,576
Meigs	1,476	49.73%	1,228	41.37%	245	8.25%	19	0.64%	248	8.36%	2,968
Monroe	4,872	44.58%	5,257	48.11%	713	6.52%	86	0.79%	-385	-3.53%	10,928
Montgomery	16,498	49.06%	15,133	45.01%	1,781	5.30%	213	0.63%	1,365	4.05%	33,625
Moore	935	47.22%	846	42.73%	177	8.94%	22	1.11%	89	4.49%	1,980
Morgan	2,767	51.97%	2,070	38.88%	446	8.38%	41	0.77%	697	13.09%	5,324
Obion	6,226	53.97%	4,310	37.36%	932	8.08%	68	0.59%	1,916	16.61%	11,536
Overton	3,800	63.00%	1,756	29.11%	431	7.15%	45	0.75%	2,044	33.89%	6,032
Perry	1,444	60.52%	747	31.31%	178	7.46%	17	0.71%	697	29.21%	2,386
Pickett	901	43.51%	1,046	50.51%	116	5.60%	8	0.39%	-145	-7.00%	2,071
Polk	2,450	51.36%	1,910	40.04%	377	7.90%	33	0.69%	540	11.32%	4,770
Putnam	10,047	48.10%	9,093	43.53%	1,487	7.12%	261	1.25%	954	4.57%	20,888
Rhea	3,969	43.20%	4,476	48.72%	694	7.55%	49	0.53%	-507	-5.52%	9,188
Roane	9,744	47.57%	9,044	44.15%	1,438	7.02%	259	1.26%	700	3.42%	20,485
Robertson	8,465	52.16%	6,685	41.19%	993	6.12%	86	0.53%	1,780	10.97%	16,229
Rutherford	22,815	44.22%	24,565	47.61%	3,787	7.34%	427	0.83%	-1,750	-3.39%	51,594
Scott	2,506	44.46%	2,646	46.94%	431	7.65%	54	0.96%	-140	-2.48%	5,637
Sequatchie	1,598	48.45%	1,391	42.18%	288	8.73%	21	0.64%	207	6.27%	3,298
Sevier	7,136	34.23%	11,847	56.83%	1,650	7.92%	213	1.02%	-4,711	-22.60%	20,846
Shelby	179,663	55.05%	136,315	41.77%	8,307	2.55%	2,095	0.64%	43,348	13.28%	326,380
Smith	3,812	62.94%	1,857	30.66%	346	5.71%	42	0.69%	1,955	32.28%	6,057
Stewart	2,962	63.02%	1,306	27.79%	386	8.21%	46	0.98%	1,656	35.23%	4,700
Sullivan	20,571	38.21%	29,296	54.42%	3,555	6.60%	415	0.77%	-8,725	-16.21%	53,837
Sumner	19,205	44.50%	20,863	48.35%	2,783	6.45%	303	0.70%	-1,658	-3.85%	43,154
Tipton	6,596	43.82%	7,585	50.40%	799	5.31%	71	0.47%	-989	-6.58%	15,051
Trousdale	1,615	64.63%	683	27.33%	190	7.60%	11	0.44%	932	37.30%	2,499
Unicoi	2,131	37.03%	3,122	54.25%	447	7.77%	55	0.96%	-991	-17.22%	5,755
Union	2,421	47.37%	2,253	44.08%	385	7.53%	52	1.02%	168	3.29%	5,111
Van Buren	1,010	60.73%	504	30.31%	128	7.70%	21	1.26%	506	30.42%	1,663
Warren	6,389	54.92%	4,226	36.33%	917	7.88%	101	0.87%	2,163	18.59%	11,633
Washington	13,259	38.06%	18,960	54.42%	2,237	6.42%	384	1.10%	-5,701	-16.36%	34,840
Wayne	1,574	33.85%	2,715	58.39%	323	6.95%	38	0.82%	-1,141	-24.54%	4,650
Weakley	5,657	50.45%	4,622	41.22%	872	7.78%	63	0.56%	1,035	9.23%	11,214
White	3,592	54.14%	2,498	37.65%	505	7.61%	40	0.60%	1,094	16.49%	6,635
Williamson	15,231	33.57%	27,699	61.04%	2,071	4.56%	375	0.83%	-12,468	-27.47%	45,376
Wilson	13,655	46.22%	13,817	46.77%	1,841	6.23%	230	0.78%	-162	-0.55%	29,543
Totals	909,146	48.00%	863,530	45.59%	105,918	5.59%	15,511	0.82%	45,616	2.41%	1,894,105

==== Counties that flipped from Democratic to Republican ====
- Bledsoe
- Claiborne
- Hardin
- Lincoln
- Macon
- Pickett
- Rutherford
- Sumner
- Wilson

=== By congressional district ===
Despite losing the state, Dole won five of nine districts, including one which elected a Democrat, while the remaining four were won by Clinton, including one which elected a Republican.

District	Clinton	Dole	Perot	Representative
1st	38%	55%	7%	Jimmy Quillen
1st	38%	55%	7%	Bill Jenkins
2nd	43%	52%	6%	Jimmy Duncan
3rd	46%	47%	7%	Zach Wamp
4th	47%	46%	8%	Van Hilleary
5th	56%	39%	5%	Bob Clement
6th	46%	48%	7%	Bart Gordon
7th	41%	54%	5%	Ed Bryant
8th	51%	44%	6%	John S. Tanner
9th	71%	27%	2%	Harold Ford Sr.
9th	71%	27%	2%	Harold Ford Jr.

== See also ==
- 1996 United States Senate election in Tennessee
- 1996 United States House of Representatives elections in Tennessee
- Presidency of Bill Clinton
