= 1996 United States presidential election in Maryland =

- November 5, 1996
- Turnout: 69.61%

Nominee	Bill Clinton	Bob Dole	Ross Perot
Party	Democratic	Republican	Reform
Home state	Arkansas	Kansas	Texas
Running mate	Al Gore	Jack Kemp	James Campbell (Note: On the California, Indiana, Iowa, Kansas, Louisiana, Maine, Maryland, Missouri, Montana, Oregon, South Dakota, Tennessee, and Texas election ballots, James Campbell of California, Perot's former boss at IBM, was listed as a stand-in vice-presidential candidate until Perot decided on Pat Choate as his choice for Vice President.)
Electoral vote	10	0	0
Popular vote	966,207	681,530	115,812
Percentage	54.25%	38.27%	6.50%
County results
Clinton
40–50%
50–60%
70–80%
Dole
40–50%
50–60%
President before election
Bill Clinton
Democratic
Elected President
Bill Clinton
Democratic

The 1996 United States presidential election in Maryland took place on November 5, 1996, as part of the 1996 United States presidential election. Voters chose 10 representatives, or electors to the Electoral College, who voted for president and vice president.

Maryland was won by incumbent President Bill Clinton (D-Arkansas) with 54.25% of the popular vote over Senator Bob Dole (R-Kansas) with 38.27%. Businessman Ross Perot (Reform-Texas) finished in third, with 6.50% of the popular vote. Clinton ultimately won the national vote, defeating both challengers and becoming re-elected to a second term as U.S. President.

To date this is the last election in which Dorchester County voted for a Democratic presidential candidate; conversely, this is also the last time Charles County voted for a Republican presidential candidate, as it experienced an influx of African-American migration and greater ties to the Washington metropolitan area. It is also the last time that ancestrally German Unionist Garrett County was not the most Republican county in the state (as it was second to Carroll County), and the last occasion in which Maryland was not the most Democratic state in the South (as it was second to Clinton's native Arkansas).

In this election, Maryland voted 7.46% to the left of the nation at-large.

== Results ==
1996 United States presidential election in Maryland
Party	Candidate	Votes	Percentage	Electoral votes
Democratic	Bill Clinton (incumbent)	966,207	54.25%	10
Republican	Bob Dole	681,530	38.27%	0
Reform	Ross Perot	115,812	6.50%	0
Libertarian	Harry Browne	8,765	0.49%	0
Constitution	Howard Phillips	3,402	0.19%	0
N/A	Write-ins	2,637	0.15%	0
Natural Law	Dr. John Hagelin	2,517	0.14%	0
Totals		1,780,870	100.0%	10

=== Results by county ===
County	Bill Clinton Democratic		Bob Dole Republican		Ross Perot Reform		Various candidates Other parties		Margin		Total votes cast
County	#	%	#	%	#	%	#	%	#	%	Total votes cast
Allegany	11,025	42.40%	12,136	46.67%	2,652	10.20%	189	0.73%	-1,111	-4.27%	26,002
Anne Arundel	72,147	42.02%	83,574	48.68%	14,287	8.32%	1,677	0.98%	-11,427	-6.66%	171,685
Baltimore	132,599	49.12%	114,449	42.39%	20,393	7.55%	2,527	0.94%	18,150	6.73%	269,968
Baltimore City	145,441	79.34%	28,467	15.53%	7,473	4.08%	1,942	1.06%	116,974	63.81%	183,323
Calvert	10,008	42.47%	11,509	48.84%	1,932	8.20%	117	0.50%	-1,501	-6.37%	23,566
Caroline	3,251	39.76%	3,874	47.38%	947	11.58%	105	1.28%	-623	-7.62%	8,177
Carroll	17,122	32.31%	30,316	57.20%	4,873	9.19%	686	1.29%	-13,194	-24.89%	52,997
Cecil	10,144	41.47%	10,885	44.50%	3,124	12.77%	307	1.26%	-741	-3.03%	24,460
Charles	15,890	44.35%	17,432	48.66%	2,333	6.51%	170	0.47%	-1,542	-4.31%	35,825
Dorchester	4,613	45.89%	4,337	43.15%	1,008	10.03%	94	0.94%	276	2.74%	10,052
Frederick	25,081	38.41%	34,494	52.82%	4,989	7.64%	739	1.13%	-9,413	-14.41%	65,303
Garrett	3,121	31.89%	5,400	55.18%	1,200	12.26%	65	0.66%	-2,279	-23.29%	9,786
Harford	29,779	38.08%	39,686	50.76%	7,939	10.15%	787	1.01%	-9,907	-12.68%	78,191
Howard	47,569	49.81%	40,849	42.77%	6,011	6.29%	1,079	1.13%	6,720	7.04%	95,508
Kent	3,207	45.83%	3,055	43.66%	676	9.66%	60	0.86%	152	2.17%	6,998
Montgomery	198,807	59.36%	117,730	35.15%	14,450	4.31%	3,910	1.17%	81,077	24.21%	334,897
Prince George's	176,612	73.50%	52,697	21.93%	9,153	3.81%	1,840	0.77%	123,915	51.57%	240,302
Queen Anne's	5,054	37.06%	7,147	52.40%	1,312	9.62%	126	0.92%	-2,093	-15.34%	13,639
Somerset	3,557	49.62%	2,919	40.72%	613	8.55%	80	1.12%	638	8.90%	7,169
St. Mary's	9,988	41.95%	11,835	49.71%	1,827	7.67%	158	0.66%	-1,847	-7.76%	23,808
Talbot	4,821	37.50%	6,997	54.43%	914	7.11%	123	0.96%	-2,176	-16.93%	12,855
Washington	16,481	39.11%	21,434	50.86%	3,934	9.34%	293	0.70%	-4,953	-11.75%	42,142
Wicomico	12,303	45.09%	12,687	46.50%	2,160	7.92%	136	0.50%	-384	-1.41%	27,286
Worcester	7,587	44.81%	7,621	45.01%	1,612	9.52%	111	0.66%	-34	-0.20%	16,931
Totals	966,207	54.25%	681,530	38.27%	115,812	6.50%	17,321	0.97%	284,677	15.98%	1,780,870

Counties that flipped from Republican to Democratic

- Dorchester
- Kent
- Somerset

=== By congressional district ===
Clinton won five of eight congressional districts, including one which elected a Republican, while the other three were won by Dole.

District	Clinton	Dole	Perot	Representative
1st	43%	48%	9%	Wayne Gilchrest
2nd	40%	50%	10%	Bob Ehrlich
3rd	59%	34%	7%	Ben Cardin
4th	81%	16%	3%	Albert Wynn
5th	52%	42%	6%	Steny Hoyer
6th	38.8%	52.6%	8.6%	Roscoe Bartlett
7th	82%	15%	5%	Elijah Cummings
8th	57.5%	38%	4.5%	Connie Morella

== See also ==
- United States presidential elections in Maryland
- 1996 United States presidential election
- 1996 United States elections
