= 1996 United States presidential election in South Dakota =

- November 5, 1996
- Turnout: 71.6% (of registered voters) ▼3.4 pp 62.1% (of voting age population) ▼5.1 pp

| Nominee | Bob Dole | Bill Clinton | Ross Perot |
| Party | Republican | Democratic | Independent |
| Alliance | | | Reform |
| Home state | Kansas | Arkansas | Texas |
| Running mate | Jack Kemp | Al Gore | James Campbell (Note: On the California, Indiana, Iowa, Kansas, Louisiana, Maine, Maryland, Missouri, Montana, Oregon, South Dakota, Tennessee, and Texas election ballots, James Campbell of California, Perot's former boss at IBM, was listed as a stand-in vice-presidential candidate until Perot decided on Pat Choate as his choice for Vice President.) |
| Electoral vote | 3 | 0 | 0 |
| Popular vote | 150,543 | 139,333 | 31,250 |
| Percentage | 46.49% | 43.03% | 9.65% |
County results
Dole
40–50%
50–60%
60–70%
Clinton
40–50%
50–60%
60–70%
70–80%
80–90%
President before election
Bill Clinton
Democratic
Elected President
Bill Clinton
Democratic

The 1996 United States presidential election in South Dakota took place on November 5, 1996. All 50 states and the District of Columbia, were part of the 1996 United States presidential election. Voters chose three electors to the Electoral College, which selected the president and vice president.

South Dakota was won by Kansas Senator Bob Dole, who was running against incumbent United States President Bill Clinton of Arkansas. Clinton ran a second time with former Tennessee Senator Al Gore as vice president, and Dole ran with former New York Congressman Jack Kemp.

South Dakota weighed in for this election as 12 points more Republican than the national average. The presidential election of 1996 was a very multi-partisan election for South Dakota, with more than ten percent of the electorate voting for third-party candidates. Most counties turned out in this election for Dole. The major exceptions were the overwhelmingly Democratic majority-Native American counties of Shannon, Todd, Buffalo and Dewey, and a number of East River counties near Minnesota including Brown County, and Sioux Falls's Minnehaha County, which gave mostly pluralities to Clinton. In his second bid for the presidency, Ross Perot led the newly reformed Reform Party to gain over nine percent of the votes in South Dakota, and to pull in support nationally as the most popular third-party candidate to run for United States Presidency in recent times.

As of the 2024 presidential election, this is the last election in which South Dakota was seriously contested, as well as the last time Beadle County, Bon Homme County, Brule County, Charles Mix County, Deuel County, Grant County, Jerauld County, Kingsbury County, Sanborn County, and Union County voted for a Democratic presidential candidate.

== Results ==
1996 United States presidential election in South Dakota
| Party | Candidate | Votes | Percentage | Electoral votes |
|---|---|---|---|---|
| Republican | Bob Dole | 150,543 | 46.49% | 3 |
| Democratic | Bill Clinton (incumbent) | 139,333 | 43.03% | 0 |
| Independent | Ross Perot | 31,250 | 9.65% | 0 |
| Libertarian | Harry Browne | 1,472 | 0.45% | 0 |
| Independent | Howard Phillips | 912 | 0.28% | 0 |
| Independent | John Hagelin | 316 | 0.10% | 0 |
| Totals | | 323,826 | 100.00% | 3 |
| Voter Turnout (Voting age/Registered) | | | | |

=== Results by county ===
| County | Bob Dole Republican | | Bill Clinton Democratic | | Ross Perot Independent | | Various candidates Other parties | | Margin | | Total votes cast |
| County | # | % | # | % | # | % | # | % | # | % | Total votes cast |
|---|---|---|---|---|---|---|---|---|---|---|---|
| Aurora | 709 | 47.05% | 664 | 44.06% | 119 | 7.90% | 15 | 1.00% | 45 | 2.99% | 1,507 |
| Beadle | 3,670 | 42.77% | 3,984 | 46.43% | 842 | 9.81% | 85 | 0.99% | -314 | -3.66% | 8,581 |
| Bennett | 539 | 47.07% | 507 | 44.28% | 93 | 8.12% | 6 | 0.52% | 32 | 2.79% | 1,145 |
| Bon Homme | 1,428 | 41.56% | 1,569 | 45.66% | 391 | 11.38% | 48 | 1.40% | -141 | -4.10% | 3,436 |
| Brookings | 5,112 | 45.35% | 5,105 | 45.29% | 979 | 8.69% | 76 | 0.67% | 7 | 0.06% | 11,272 |
| Brown | 6,801 | 41.35% | 7,913 | 48.11% | 1,622 | 9.86% | 111 | 0.67% | -1,112 | -6.76% | 16,447 |
| Brule | 981 | 40.81% | 1,091 | 45.38% | 281 | 11.69% | 51 | 2.12% | -110 | -4.57% | 2,404 |
| Buffalo | 134 | 20.94% | 465 | 72.66% | 35 | 5.47% | 6 | 0.94% | -331 | -51.72% | 640 |
| Butte | 1,947 | 53.24% | 1,132 | 30.95% | 541 | 14.79% | 37 | 1.01% | 815 | 22.29% | 3,657 |
| Campbell | 623 | 64.23% | 202 | 20.82% | 140 | 14.43% | 5 | 0.52% | 421 | 43.41% | 970 |
| Charles Mix | 1,711 | 42.40% | 1,913 | 47.41% | 390 | 9.67% | 21 | 0.52% | -202 | -5.01% | 4,035 |
| Clark | 998 | 44.51% | 956 | 42.64% | 272 | 12.13% | 16 | 0.71% | 42 | 1.87% | 2,242 |
| Clay | 2,008 | 36.04% | 2,980 | 53.48% | 505 | 9.06% | 79 | 1.42% | -972 | -17.44% | 5,572 |
| Codington | 4,995 | 45.18% | 4,722 | 42.71% | 1,239 | 11.21% | 99 | 0.90% | 273 | 2.47% | 11,055 |
| Corson | 533 | 41.00% | 539 | 41.46% | 216 | 16.62% | 12 | 0.92% | -6 | -0.46% | 1,300 |
| Custer | 1,740 | 51.83% | 1,122 | 33.42% | 418 | 12.45% | 77 | 2.29% | 618 | 18.41% | 3,357 |
| Davison | 3,371 | 44.78% | 3,364 | 44.69% | 737 | 9.79% | 56 | 0.74% | 7 | 0.09% | 7,528 |
| Day | 1,282 | 36.29% | 1,840 | 52.08% | 395 | 11.18% | 16 | 0.45% | -558 | -15.79% | 3,533 |
| Deuel | 955 | 40.66% | 1,090 | 46.40% | 275 | 11.71% | 29 | 1.23% | -135 | -5.74% | 2,349 |
| Dewey | 657 | 33.20% | 1,114 | 56.29% | 195 | 9.85% | 13 | 0.66% | -457 | -23.09% | 1,979 |
| Douglas | 1,210 | 63.38% | 524 | 27.45% | 161 | 8.43% | 14 | 0.73% | 686 | 35.93% | 1,909 |
| Edmunds | 1,055 | 45.67% | 973 | 42.12% | 263 | 11.39% | 19 | 0.82% | 82 | 3.55% | 2,310 |
| Fall River | 1,636 | 47.31% | 1,357 | 39.24% | 417 | 12.06% | 48 | 1.39% | 279 | 8.07% | 3,458 |
| Faulk | 726 | 52.27% | 493 | 35.49% | 165 | 11.88% | 5 | 0.36% | 233 | 16.78% | 1,389 |
| Grant | 1,782 | 43.64% | 1,805 | 44.21% | 471 | 11.54% | 25 | 0.61% | -23 | -0.57% | 4,083 |
| Gregory | 1,208 | 49.65% | 923 | 37.94% | 286 | 11.76% | 16 | 0.66% | 285 | 11.71% | 2,433 |
| Haakon | 887 | 68.81% | 284 | 22.03% | 110 | 8.53% | 8 | 0.62% | 603 | 46.78% | 1,289 |
| Hamlin | 1,352 | 49.02% | 1,101 | 39.92% | 285 | 10.33% | 20 | 0.73% | 251 | 9.10% | 2,758 |
| Hand | 1,187 | 52.34% | 803 | 35.41% | 250 | 11.02% | 28 | 1.23% | 384 | 16.93% | 2,268 |
| Hanson | 801 | 52.22% | 541 | 35.27% | 170 | 11.08% | 22 | 1.43% | 260 | 16.95% | 1,534 |
| Harding | 537 | 68.41% | 151 | 19.24% | 90 | 11.46% | 7 | 0.89% | 386 | 49.17% | 785 |
| Hughes | 4,469 | 56.80% | 2,788 | 35.43% | 531 | 6.75% | 80 | 1.02% | 1,681 | 21.37% | 7,868 |
| Hutchinson | 2,177 | 55.66% | 1,285 | 32.86% | 409 | 10.46% | 40 | 1.02% | 892 | 22.80% | 3,911 |
| Hyde | 493 | 54.54% | 309 | 34.18% | 95 | 10.51% | 7 | 0.77% | 184 | 20.36% | 904 |
| Jackson | 646 | 55.26% | 423 | 36.18% | 88 | 7.53% | 12 | 1.03% | 223 | 19.08% | 1,169 |
| Jerauld | 530 | 38.86% | 656 | 48.09% | 151 | 11.07% | 27 | 1.98% | -126 | -9.23% | 1,364 |
| Jones | 463 | 63.51% | 184 | 25.24% | 75 | 10.29% | 7 | 0.96% | 279 | 38.27% | 729 |
| Kingsbury | 1,297 | 43.22% | 1,357 | 45.22% | 320 | 10.66% | 27 | 0.90% | -60 | -2.00% | 3,001 |
| Lake | 1,966 | 38.48% | 2,526 | 49.44% | 593 | 11.61% | 24 | 0.47% | -560 | -10.96% | 5,109 |
| Lawrence | 4,430 | 46.92% | 3,568 | 37.79% | 1,308 | 13.85% | 136 | 1.44% | 862 | 9.13% | 9,442 |
| Lincoln | 4,201 | 48.92% | 3,643 | 42.42% | 682 | 7.94% | 61 | 0.71% | 558 | 6.50% | 8,587 |
| Lyman | 726 | 47.67% | 646 | 42.42% | 130 | 8.54% | 21 | 1.38% | 80 | 5.25% | 1,523 |
| Marshall | 861 | 38.33% | 1,185 | 52.76% | 189 | 8.41% | 11 | 0.49% | -324 | -14.43% | 2,246 |
| McCook | 1,292 | 47.45% | 1,166 | 42.82% | 245 | 9.00% | 20 | 0.73% | 126 | 4.63% | 2,723 |
| McPherson | 1,080 | 62.25% | 463 | 26.69% | 182 | 10.49% | 10 | 0.58% | 617 | 35.56% | 1,735 |
| Meade | 4,984 | 54.32% | 2,960 | 32.26% | 1,133 | 12.35% | 99 | 1.08% | 2,024 | 22.06% | 9,176 |
| Mellette | 417 | 52.26% | 302 | 37.84% | 67 | 8.40% | 12 | 1.50% | 115 | 14.42% | 798 |
| Miner | 571 | 38.35% | 739 | 49.63% | 170 | 11.42% | 9 | 0.60% | -168 | -11.28% | 1,489 |
| Minnehaha | 27,432 | 44.24% | 29,790 | 48.05% | 4,425 | 7.14% | 357 | 0.58% | -2,358 | -3.81% | 62,004 |
| Moody | 1,024 | 37.01% | 1,443 | 52.15% | 284 | 10.26% | 16 | 0.58% | -419 | -15.14% | 2,767 |
| Pennington | 19,293 | 54.32% | 12,784 | 36.00% | 3,149 | 8.87% | 290 | 0.82% | 6,509 | 18.32% | 35,516 |
| Perkins | 983 | 58.10% | 460 | 27.19% | 225 | 13.30% | 24 | 1.42% | 523 | 30.91% | 1,692 |
| Potter | 979 | 57.52% | 534 | 31.37% | 181 | 10.63% | 8 | 0.47% | 445 | 26.15% | 1,702 |
| Roberts | 1,646 | 37.99% | 2,186 | 50.45% | 474 | 10.94% | 27 | 0.62% | -540 | -12.46% | 4,333 |
| Sanborn | 630 | 43.81% | 647 | 44.99% | 151 | 10.50% | 10 | 0.70% | -17 | -1.18% | 1,438 |
| Shannon | 253 | 11.08% | 1,926 | 84.33% | 87 | 3.81% | 18 | 0.79% | -1,673 | -73.25% | 2,284 |
| Spink | 1,651 | 45.00% | 1,636 | 44.59% | 360 | 9.81% | 22 | 0.60% | 15 | 0.41% | 3,669 |
| Stanley | 795 | 57.53% | 454 | 32.85% | 121 | 8.76% | 12 | 0.87% | 341 | 24.68% | 1,382 |
| Sully | 592 | 57.76% | 321 | 31.32% | 106 | 10.34% | 6 | 0.59% | 271 | 26.44% | 1,025 |
| Todd | 482 | 24.21% | 1,380 | 69.31% | 108 | 5.42% | 21 | 1.05% | -898 | -45.10% | 1,991 |
| Tripp | 1,680 | 53.64% | 1,088 | 34.74% | 337 | 10.76% | 27 | 0.86% | 592 | 18.90% | 3,132 |
| Turner | 1,970 | 48.63% | 1,682 | 41.52% | 385 | 9.50% | 14 | 0.35% | 288 | 7.11% | 4,051 |
| Union | 2,234 | 42.90% | 2,378 | 45.67% | 555 | 10.66% | 40 | 0.77% | -144 | -2.77% | 5,207 |
| Walworth | 1,461 | 52.38% | 939 | 33.67% | 366 | 13.12% | 23 | 0.82% | 522 | 18.71% | 2,789 |
| Yankton | 3,885 | 44.02% | 3,775 | 42.77% | 1,073 | 12.16% | 93 | 1.05% | 110 | 1.25% | 8,826 |
| Ziebach | 375 | 40.32% | 483 | 51.94% | 62 | 6.67% | 10 | 1.08% | -108 | -11.62% | 930 |
| Totals | 150,543 | 46.49% | 139,333 | 43.03% | 31,250 | 9.65% | 2,700 | 0.83% | 11,210 | 3.46% | 323,826 |

==== Counties that flipped from Democratic to Republican ====
- Aurora
- Davison
- Hanson
- Spink

==== Counties that flipped from Republican to Democratic ====
- Corson
- Grant
- Ziebach

== See also ==
- Presidency of Bill Clinton
- United States presidential elections in South Dakota
