= 1996 United States presidential election in Oregon =

- November 5, 1996

Nominee	Bill Clinton	Bob Dole	Ross Perot
Party	Democratic	Republican	Reform
Home state	Arkansas	Kansas	Texas
Running mate	Al Gore	Jack Kemp	James Campbell (Note: On the California, Indiana, Iowa, Kansas, Louisiana, Maine, Maryland, Missouri, Montana, Oregon, South Dakota, Tennessee, and Texas election ballots, James Campbell of California, Perot's former boss at IBM, was listed as a stand-in vice-presidential candidate until Perot decided on Pat Choate as his choice for Vice President.)
Electoral vote	7	0	0
Popular vote	649,641	538,152	121,221
Percentage	47.15%	39.06%	8.80%
County results
Clinton
40–50%
50–60%
Dole
40–50%
50–60%
60–70%
President before election
Bill Clinton
Democratic
Elected President
Bill Clinton
Democratic

The 1996 United States presidential election in Oregon took place on November 5, 1996, as part of the 1996 United States presidential election. Voters chose seven representatives, or electors to the Electoral College, who voted for president and vice president.

Oregon was won by President Bill Clinton (D) over Senator Bob Dole (R-Kansas), with Clinton winning 47.2% to 39.1% for a margin of 8.1%. Billionaire businessman Ross Perot (Reform-Texas) finished in third, with 8.8% of the popular vote. With a margin of victory of 8.09% for Clinton, the state voted 0.42% to the right of the nation at-large and became the closest to the national results.

Oregon was one of thirteen states where, on the election ballot, James Campbell of California, Perot's former boss at IBM, was listed as a stand-in candidate for vice president.

As of the 2024 presidential election, this is the last occasion when the Democratic nominee has carried Gilliam, Morrow and Coos Counties. It is also the last time any Eastern Oregon county voted for the Democratic candidate.

== Results ==
1996 United States presidential election in Oregon
Party	Candidate	Votes	Percentage	Electoral votes
Democratic	Bill Clinton (incumbent)	649,641	47.15%	7
Republican	Bob Dole	538,152	39.06%	0
Reform	Ross Perot	121,221	8.80%	0
Pacific Green	Ralph Nader	49,415	3.59%	0
Libertarian	Harry Browne	8,903	0.65%	0
Independent	Howard Phillips	3,379	0.25%	0
Natural Law	John Hagelin	2,798	0.20%	0
Write-ins		2,329	0.17%	0
Socialist	Mary Cal Hollis	1,922	0.14%	0
Totals		1,377,760	100.0%	7

=== Results by county ===
County	Bill Clinton Democratic		Bob Dole Republican		Ross Perot Reform<l		Ralph Nader Pacific Green		Various candidates Other parties		Margin		Total votes cast
County	#	%	#	%	#	%	#	%	#	%	#	%	Total votes cast
Baker	2,547	33.07%	3,975	51.60%	900	11.68%	154	2.00%	127	1.65%	-1,428	-18.53%	7,703
Benton	17,211	49.89%	12,450	36.09%	2,445	7.09%	1,901	5.51%	493	1.43%	4,761	13.80%	34,500
Clackamas	67,709	46.65%	59,443	40.95%	12,304	8.48%	4,038	2.78%	1,652	1.14%	8,266	5.70%	145,146
Clatsop	7,732	50.19%	5,334	34.63%	1,582	10.27%	537	3.49%	220	1.43%	2,398	15.56%	15,405
Columbia	9,275	50.20%	6,205	33.58%	2,330	12.61%	413	2.24%	253	1.37%	3,070	16.62%	18,476
Coos	12,171	44.04%	10,886	39.39%	3,460	12.52%	600	2.17%	521	1.89%	1,285	4.65%	27,638
Crook	2,607	37.30%	3,250	46.50%	948	13.56%	76	1.09%	108	1.55%	-643	-9.20%	6,989
Curry	4,202	38.30%	4,790	43.66%	1,560	14.22%	224	2.04%	196	1.79%	-588	-5.36%	10,972
Deschutes	17,151	37.88%	21,135	46.67%	5,306	11.72%	1,023	2.26%	667	1.47%	-3,984	-8.79%	45,282
Douglas	15,250	35.66%	21,855	51.10%	4,465	10.44%	632	1.48%	567	1.33%	-6,605	-15.44%	42,769
Gilliam	485	46.63%	398	38.27%	143	13.75%	6	0.58%	8	0.77%	87	8.36%	1,040
Grant	1,180	30.75%	2,110	54.99%	432	11.26%	64	1.67%	51	1.33%	-930	-24.24%	3,837
Harney	980	27.88%	1,948	55.42%	506	14.40%	38	1.08%	43	1.22%	-968	-27.54%	3,515
Hood River	3,654	48.24%	2,794	36.89%	721	9.52%	327	4.32%	78	1.03%	860	11.35%	7,574
Jackson	29,230	39.69%	33,771	45.86%	7,470	10.14%	1,958	2.66%	1,218	1.65%	-4,541	-6.17%	73,647
Jefferson	2,555	41.24%	2,634	42.52%	813	13.12%	85	1.37%	108	1.74%	-79	-1.28%	6,195
Josephine	11,113	34.61%	16,048	49.98%	3,546	11.04%	649	2.02%	755	2.35%	-4,935	-15.37%	32,111
Klamath	7,207	32.23%	12,116	54.19%	2,538	11.35%	202	0.90%	297	1.33%	-4,909	-21.96%	22,360
Lake	962	26.34%	2,239	61.31%	385	10.54%	31	0.85%	35	0.96%	-1,277	-34.97%	3,652
Lane	69,461	49.69%	48,253	34.52%	11,498	8.23%	7,907	5.66%	2,668	1.91%	21,208	15.17%	139,787
Lincoln	10,552	51.21%	6,717	32.60%	2,269	11.01%	758	3.68%	311	1.51%	3,835	18.61%	20,607
Linn	17,041	41.24%	18,331	44.36%	4,773	11.55%	689	1.67%	491	1.19%	-1,290	-3.12%	41,325
Malheur	2,827	28.58%	6,045	61.11%	844	8.53%	61	0.62%	115	1.16%	-3,218	-32.53%	9,892
Marion	48,637	45.26%	46,415	43.19%	8,802	8.19%	2,314	2.15%	1,295	1.21%	2,222	2.07%	107,463
Morrow	1,426	42.81%	1,381	41.46%	455	13.66%	30	0.90%	39	1.17%	45	1.35%	3,331
Multnomah	159,878	59.22%	71,094	26.33%	17,536	6.50%	17,815	6.60%	3,638	1.35%	88,784	32.89%	269,961
Polk	10,942	43.20%	11,478	45.31%	2,093	8.26%	555	2.19%	263	1.04%	-536	-2.11%	25,331
Sherman	444	41.61%	476	44.61%	126	11.81%	11	1.03%	10	0.94%	-32	-3.00%	1,067
Tillamook	5,775	50.96%	3,884	34.27%	1,263	11.15%	283	2.50%	127	1.12%	1,891	16.69%	11,332
Umatilla	8,774	40.82%	9,703	45.14%	2,500	11.63%	254	1.18%	264	1.23%	-929	-4.32%	21,495
Union	4,379	38.60%	5,414	47.72%	1,241	10.94%	198	1.75%	113	1.00%	-1,035	-9.12%	11,345
Wallowa	1,321	30.74%	2,379	55.36%	483	11.24%	58	1.35%	56	1.30%	-1,058	-24.62%	4,297
Wasco	4,967	49.91%	3,662	36.80%	1,004	10.09%	200	2.01%	119	1.20%	1,305	13.11%	9,952
Washington	76,619	47.96%	65,221	40.83%	11,446	7.16%	4,555	2.85%	1,914	1.20%	11,398	7.13%	159,755
Wheeler	299	34.21%	418	47.83%	121	13.84%	16	1.83%	20	2.29%	-119	-13.62%	874
Yamhill	13,078	42.00%	13,900	44.64%	2,913	9.36%	753	2.42%	491	1.58%	-822	-2.64%	31,135
Totals	649,641	47.15%	538,152	39.06%	121,221	8.80%	49,415	3.59%	19,331	1.40%	111,489	8.09%	1,377,760

Counties that flipped from Democratic to Republican

- Curry
- Deschutes
- Jackson
- Jefferson

Counties that flipped from Republican to Democratic

- Gilliam
- Marion
- Morrow

== See also ==
- United States presidential elections in Oregon
- Presidency of Bill Clinton
