= 1996 United States presidential election in Louisiana =

- November 5, 1996
- Turnout: 57% (VAP)

Nominee	Bill Clinton	Bob Dole	Ross Perot
Party	Democratic	Republican	Reform
Home state	Arkansas	Kansas	Texas
Running mate	Al Gore	Jack Kemp	James Campbell (Note: On the California, Indiana, Iowa, Kansas, Louisiana, Maine, Maryland, Missouri, Montana, Oregon, South Dakota, Tennessee, and Texas election ballots, James Campbell of California, Perot's former boss at IBM, was listed as a stand-in vice-presidential candidate until Perot decided on Pat Choate as his choice for Vice President.)
Electoral vote	9	0	0
Popular vote	927,837	712,586	123,293
Percentage	52.01%	39.94%	6.91%
Parish results
Clinton
40–50%
50–60%
60–70%
70–80%
Dole
40–50%
50–60%
60–70%
President before election
Bill Clinton
Democratic
Elected President
Bill Clinton
Democratic

The 1996 United States presidential election in Louisiana took place on November 5, 1996. Voters chose nine representatives, or electors to the Electoral College, who voted for president and vice president.

Louisiana was won by President Bill Clinton (D) by a margin of 12.07%, a major increase from the statewide results in 1992 when he carried the state by a margin of 4.61%. Clinton won most of the parishes and congressional districts in the state and performed strongly in both the urban and rural areas of Louisiana. The only congressional district Dole won was the 1st district, which included all of St. Tammany Parish and parts of Jefferson Parish, two of the most heavily Republican parishes in the state.

Louisiana was generally more competitive in this time period than the rest of the Deep South due to its large black population and a sizeable minority of white Blue Dog Democrats. It is also very racially divided, with whites voting Republican and blacks voting Democratic. Clinton was able to carry 33 percent of white voters, which threw the state toward his column. Despite such a sizeable margin, Louisiana was the only state that Clinton won by more than a 2.4 point margin which wasn't called by news networks for him as soon as the polls closed.

This election also marked the end of Louisiana as a competitive state in federal elections, as future years saw the state's political alignment more closely resemble those in other, nearby Deep South states like Mississippi and Alabama, as well as in tandem with Arkansas, Clinton's home state. Rural, Democratic-voting cultural conservatives began siding with the Republican Party. Clinton's 927,837 votes is the most received by a Democratic presidential candidate in the state's history.

As of the 2024 presidential election, this is the last time Louisiana supported a Democratic presidential candidate, as well as the last time a Democrat carried the following parishes: Acadia, Allen, Ascension, Avoyelles, Calcasieu, Caldwell, Cameron, Catahoula, Claiborne, Concordia, DeSoto, East Feliciana, Evangeline, Franklin, Iberia, Jackson, Jefferson Davis, Lafourche, Lincoln, Morehouse, Natchitoches, Plaquemines, Rapides, Red River, Richland, Sabine, Saint Bernard, Saint Charles, Saint Martin, Saint Mary, Tangipahoa, Terrebonne, Vermilion, Vernon, Washington, Webster, West Feliciana, and Winn.

It was also the last time a Democrat carried any state in the Deep South in a presidential election until Joe Biden won Georgia in 2020. This was the first time since 1944 that the state voted Democratic in consecutive elections.

== Results ==
1996 United States presidential election in Louisiana
Party	Candidate	Running mate	Popular vote		Electoral vote	
Party	Candidate	Running mate	Count	%	Count	%
Democratic	Bill Clinton of Arkansas (incumbent)	Al Gore of Tennessee (incumbent)	927,837	52.01%	9	100.00%
Republican	Bob Dole of Kansas	Jack Kemp of New York	712,586	39.94%	0	0.00%
Reform	Ross Perot of Texas	James Campbell (Note: On the California, Indiana, Iowa, Kansas, Louisiana, Maine, Maryland, Missouri, Montana, Oregon, South Dakota, Tennessee, and Texas election ballots, James Campbell of California, Perot's former boss at IBM, was listed as a stand-in vice-presidential candidate until Perot decided on Pat Choate as his choice for Vice President.) of California	123,293	6.91%	0	0.00%
Libertarian	Harry Browne of Tennessee	Jo Jorgensen of South Carolina	7,499	0.42%	0	0.00%
Liberty Ecology Community (Note: Though a candidate of the national Green Party, Nader was listed on the Louisiana ballot as a candidate for the “Liberty Ecology Community” Party.)	Ralph Nader	Winona LaDuke	4,719	0.26%	0	0.00%
Constitution	Howard Phillips of Virginia	Herbert Titus of Oregon	3,366	0.19%	0	0.00%
Natural Law	John Hagelin of Iowa	Mike Tompkins of Massachusetts	2,981	0.17%	0	0.00%
Workers World	Monica Moorehead of Alabama	Gloria LaRiva of California	1,678	0.09%	0	0.00%
Total			1,776,259	100.00%	9	100.00%

=== Results by parish ===
Parish	Bill Clinton Democratic		Bob Dole Republican		Ross Perot Reform		Harry E. Browne Libertarian		Various candidates Other parties		Margin		Total votes cast
Parish	#	%	#	%	#	%	#	%	#	%	#	%	Total votes cast
Acadia	12,300	51.41%	9,246	38.64%	2,234	9.34%	40	0.17%	107	0.45%	3,054	12.77%	23,927
Allen	4,960	55.89%	2,589	29.18%	1,187	13.38%	38	0.43%	100	1.13%	2,371	26.71%	8,874
Ascension	15,263	51.91%	10,885	37.02%	3,027	10.30%	65	0.22%	160	0.54%	4,378	14.89%	29,400
Assumption	6,416	62.83%	2,698	26.42%	904	8.85%	65	0.64%	129	1.26%	3,718	36.41%	10,212
Avoyelles	9,689	59.04%	4,433	27.01%	1,937	11.80%	89	0.54%	262	1.60%	5,256	32.03%	16,410
Beauregard	4,925	39.40%	5,526	44.21%	1,834	14.67%	96	0.77%	118	0.94%	-601	-4.81%	12,499
Bienville	4,335	58.71%	2,402	32.53%	457	6.19%	108	1.46%	82	1.11%	1,933	26.18%	7,384
Bossier	15,504	43.82%	16,852	47.63%	2,660	7.52%	141	0.40%	225	0.64%	-1,348	-3.81%	35,382
Caddo	55,543	55.89%	38,445	38.69%	4,821	4.85%	180	0.18%	390	0.39%	17,098	17.20%	99,379
Calcasieu	38,238	51.91%	26,494	35.97%	8,281	11.24%	213	0.29%	435	0.59%	11,744	15.94%	73,661
Caldwell	2,117	46.44%	1,842	40.40%	514	11.27%	39	0.86%	47	1.03%	275	6.04%	4,559
Cameron	2,103	50.70%	1,365	32.91%	594	14.32%	30	0.72%	56	1.35%	738	17.79%	4,148
Catahoula	2,692	52.11%	1,770	34.26%	615	11.90%	39	0.75%	50	0.97%	922	17.85%	5,166
Claiborne	3,609	53.55%	2,500	37.10%	530	7.86%	41	0.61%	59	0.88%	1,109	16.45%	6,739
Concordia	4,565	52.38%	3,134	35.96%	855	9.81%	78	0.90%	83	0.95%	1,431	16.42%	8,715
DeSoto	6,221	59.13%	3,526	33.52%	646	6.14%	55	0.52%	72	0.68%	2,695	25.61%	10,520
East Baton Rouge	83,493	48.93%	77,811	45.60%	7,990	4.68%	436	0.26%	917	0.54%	5,682	3.33%	170,647
East Carroll	2,149	63.00%	1,008	29.55%	186	5.45%	24	0.70%	44	1.29%	1,141	33.45%	3,411
East Feliciana	4,714	56.11%	2,949	35.10%	660	7.86%	16	0.19%	62	0.74%	1,765	21.01%	8,401
Evangeline	7,847	52.83%	5,278	35.53%	1,447	9.74%	100	0.67%	182	1.23%	2,569	17.30%	14,854
Franklin	4,076	45.29%	3,961	44.01%	814	9.04%	61	0.68%	88	0.98%	115	1.28%	9,000
Grant	2,980	40.87%	3,117	42.75%	1,055	14.47%	52	0.71%	88	1.21%	-137	-1.88%	7,292
Iberia	15,087	50.35%	12,014	40.09%	2,448	8.17%	196	0.65%	220	0.73%	3,073	10.26%	29,965
Iberville	9,553	64.20%	4,031	27.09%	1,076	7.23%	68	0.46%	151	1.01%	5,522	37.11%	14,879
Jackson	3,368	47.66%	3,030	42.88%	571	8.08%	36	0.51%	62	0.88%	338	4.78%	7,067
Jefferson	80,407	43.59%	92,820	50.32%	9,667	5.24%	504	0.27%	1,068	0.58%	-12,413	-6.73%	184,466
Jefferson Davis	6,897	53.29%	4,311	33.31%	1,543	11.92%	72	0.56%	120	0.93%	2,586	19.98%	12,943
Lafayette	32,504	43.65%	36,419	48.91%	4,631	6.22%	348	0.47%	566	0.76%	-3,915	-5.26%	74,468
Lafourche	18,810	52.84%	12,105	34.01%	3,984	11.19%	309	0.87%	388	1.09%	6,705	18.83%	35,596
LaSalle	2,543	39.09%	2,925	44.96%	947	14.56%	28	0.43%	63	0.97%	-382	-5.87%	6,506
Lincoln	7,903	49.85%	6,973	43.98%	761	4.80%	117	0.74%	101	0.64%	930	5.87%	15,855
Livingston	13,276	38.94%	16,159	47.39%	4,150	12.17%	188	0.55%	322	0.94%	-2,883	-8.45%	34,095
Madison	3,085	60.91%	1,591	31.41%	315	6.22%	26	0.51%	48	0.95%	1,494	29.50%	5,065
Morehouse	6,160	49.31%	5,193	41.57%	963	7.71%	71	0.57%	106	0.85%	967	7.74%	12,493
Natchitoches	8,296	54.69%	5,471	36.06%	1,053	6.94%	127	0.84%	223	1.47%	2,825	18.63%	15,170
Orleans	144,720	76.20%	39,576	20.84%	3,805	2.00%	554	0.29%	1,256	0.66%	105,144	55.36%	189,911
Ouachita	24,525	42.58%	28,559	49.59%	3,586	6.23%	466	0.81%	458	0.80%	-4,034	-7.01%	57,594
Plaquemines	5,348	49.53%	4,493	41.61%	856	7.93%	29	0.27%	71	0.66%	855	7.92%	10,797
Pointe Coupee	6,835	60.32%	3,545	31.28%	845	7.46%	34	0.30%	73	0.64%	3,290	29.04%	11,332
Rapides	23,004	46.07%	21,548	43.16%	4,670	9.35%	351	0.70%	358	0.72%	1,456	2.91%	49,931
Red River	2,641	61.48%	1,344	31.28%	268	6.24%	23	0.54%	20	0.47%	1,297	30.20%	4,296
Richland	4,143	46.50%	3,965	44.50%	645	7.24%	61	0.68%	96	1.08%	178	2.00%	8,910
Sabine	4,263	47.33%	3,543	39.34%	1,043	11.58%	59	0.66%	99	1.10%	720	7.99%	9,007
St. Bernard	14,312	46.33%	13,549	43.86%	2,664	8.62%	134	0.43%	233	0.75%	763	2.47%	30,892
St. Charles	10,612	49.61%	9,316	43.55%	1,307	6.11%	38	0.18%	120	0.56%	1,296	6.06%	21,393
St. Helena	3,692	65.83%	1,455	25.95%	417	7.44%	18	0.32%	26	0.46%	2,237	39.88%	5,608
St. James	7,247	67.46%	2,832	26.36%	608	5.66%	15	0.14%	41	0.38%	4,415	41.10%	10,743
St. John the Baptist	9,937	58.28%	6,025	35.34%	966	5.67%	41	0.24%	82	0.48%	3,912	22.94%	17,051
St. Landry	20,636	58.21%	12,273	34.62%	2,311	6.52%	75	0.21%	158	0.45%	8,363	23.59%	35,453
St. Martin	12,492	60.33%	6,296	30.41%	1,607	7.76%	112	0.54%	199	0.96%	6,196	29.92%	20,706
St. Mary	12,402	54.95%	8,018	35.53%	1,850	8.20%	136	0.60%	163	0.72%	4,384	19.42%	22,569
St. Tammany	24,281	32.58%	44,761	60.06%	4,741	6.36%	251	0.34%	492	0.66%	-20,480	-27.48%	74,526
Tangipahoa	18,617	49.53%	15,517	41.28%	3,144	8.36%	100	0.27%	213	0.57%	3,100	8.25%	37,591
Tensas	1,882	60.73%	1,000	32.27%	176	5.68%	12	0.39%	29	0.94%	882	28.46%	3,099
Terrebonne	18,550	51.02%	13,944	38.35%	3,359	9.24%	203	0.56%	305	0.84%	4,606	12.67%	36,361
Union	4,260	44.64%	4,418	46.30%	696	7.29%	57	0.60%	112	1.17%	-158	-1.66%	9,543
Vermilion	12,609	55.64%	7,653	33.77%	1,954	8.62%	194	0.86%	251	1.11%	4,956	21.87%	22,661
Vernon	6,195	44.36%	5,449	39.02%	2,068	14.81%	94	0.67%	160	1.15%	746	5.34%	13,966
Washington	9,603	53.28%	6,642	36.85%	1,643	9.12%	61	0.34%	74	0.41%	2,961	16.43%	18,023
Webster	9,688	55.31%	6,153	35.13%	1,324	7.56%	168	0.96%	184	1.05%	3,535	20.18%	17,517
West Baton Rouge	5,697	58.14%	3,254	33.21%	799	8.15%	13	0.13%	35	0.36%	2,443	24.93%	9,798
West Carroll	1,853	38.90%	2,366	49.66%	461	9.68%	29	0.61%	55	1.15%	-513	-10.76%	4,764
West Feliciana	2,416	53.62%	1,616	35.86%	388	8.61%	28	0.62%	58	1.29%	800	17.76%	4,506
Winn	3,779	50.64%	2,803	37.56%	735	9.85%	47	0.63%	99	1.33%	976	13.08%	7,463
Totals	927,837	52.01%	712,586	39.94%	123,293	6.91%	7,499	0.42%	12,744	0.71%	215,251	12.07%	1,783,959

==== Parishes that flipped from Republican to Democratic ====
- East Baton Rouge
- Lincoln
- Plaquemines
- Rapides
- Richland
- Saint Bernard
- Saint Charles
- Terrebonne

== See also ==
- United States presidential elections in Louisiana
- Presidency of Bill Clinton
