= 1996 United States presidential election in Iowa =

- November 5, 1996

Nominee	Bill Clinton	Bob Dole	Ross Perot
Party	Democratic	Republican	Reform
Home state	Arkansas	Kansas	Texas
Running mate	Al Gore	Jack Kemp	James Campbell (Note: On the California, Indiana, Iowa, Kansas, Louisiana, Maine, Maryland, Missouri, Montana, Oregon, South Dakota, Tennessee, and Texas election ballots, James Campbell of California, Perot's former boss at IBM, was listed as a stand-in vice-presidential candidate until Perot decided on Pat Choate as his choice for Vice President.)
Electoral vote	7	0	0
Popular vote	620,258	492,644	105,159
Percentage	50.26%	39.92%	8.52%

Clinton
30–40%
40–50%
50–60%
60–70%
Dole
40–50%
50–60%
60–70%
70–80%
President before election
Bill Clinton
Democratic
Elected President
Bill Clinton
Democratic

The 1996 United States presidential election in Iowa took place on November 5, 1996, as part of the 1996 United States presidential election. Voters chose seven representatives, or electors to the Electoral College, who voted for president and vice president.

Iowa was easily won by Democratic incumbent President Bill Clinton over Republican Senator Bob Dole of Kansas, with Clinton winning 50.26% of the vote to Dole's 39.92%, a margin of 10.34%. The Reform Party candidate, billionaire businessman Ross Perot, finished in third, with 8.52% of the popular vote. Although Clinton barely exceeded Michael Dukakis’ 1988 margin in Iowa, he was the first Democrat to carry Allamakee County and Butler County – the only Iowa counties outside the arch-conservative western fringe to back Barry Goldwater in 1964 – since Franklin D. Roosevelt in 1936. He was indeed only the second Democratic presidential nominee to ever carry Butler County since the Civil War. Clinton was the second of three Democrats (between Roosevelt in 1936 and Barack Obama in 2012) to carry the state twice.

Iowa was one of thirteen states where, on the election ballot, James Campbell of California, Perot's former boss at IBM, was listed as a stand-in vice-presidential candidate.

This is the last time Iowa was decided by a double-digit margin until 2024. It is also the last time that the counties of Adair, Appanoose, Butler, Calhoun, Cherokee, Clay, Dallas, Davis, Decatur, Dickinson, Guthrie, Hancock, Henry, Keokuk, Lucas, Madison, Monona, Monroe, Pocahontas, Ringgold, Taylor, Van Buren, Washington, Wayne, and Wright voted for the Democratic Party presidential nominee.

== Results ==
1996 United States presidential election in Iowa
Party	Candidate	Running mate	Votes	Percentage	Electoral votes
Democratic	Bill Clinton (incumbent)	Al Gore (incumbent)	620,258	50.26%	7
Republican	Robert Dole	Jack Kemp	492,644	39.92%	0
Reform	Ross Perot	James Campbell	105,159	8.52%	0
Green	Ralph Nader	Anne Goeke (Note: Iowa was one of the states where Ralph Nader's running mate (Winona LaDuke) was replaced on the ballot by Anne Goeke.)	6,550	0.53%	0
Natural Law	Dr. John Hagelin	Dr. V. Tompkins	3,349	0.27%	0
Libertarian IA	Harry Browne	Jo Jorgensen	2,315	0.19%	0
Taxpayer	Howard Phillips	Albion W. Knight Jr.	2,229	0.18%	0
No party	Write-in		1,240	0.10%	0
Socialist Workers	James Harris	Laura Garza	331 (Note: The Socialist Workers votes were not separated by county and included only as a statewide total.)	0.03%	0
Totals			1,234,075	100.0%	7
Voter Turnout (Voting age/Registered)					58%/69%

=== Results by county ===
County	Bill Clinton Democratic		Bob Dole Republican		Ross Perot Reform		Ralph Nader Green		John Hagelin Natural Law		Various candidates Other parties		Margin		Total votes cast
County	#	%	#	%	#	%	#	%	#	%	#	%	#	%	Total votes cast
Adair	1,802	45.79%	1,655	42.06%	458	11.64%	5	0.13%	2	0.05%	13	0.33%	147	3.73%	3,935
Adams	1,070	46.00%	920	39.55%	320	13.76%	4	0.17%	2	0.09%	10	0.43%	150	6.45%	2,326
Allamakee	2,551	44.13%	2,457	42.50%	680	11.76%	28	0.48%	10	0.17%	55	0.95%	94	1.63%	5,781
Appanoose	2,747	49.12%	2,233	39.93%	554	9.91%	12	0.21%	6	0.11%	40	0.72%	514	9.19%	5,592
Audubon	1,827	52.38%	1,314	37.67%	314	9.00%	8	0.23%	6	0.17%	19	0.54%	513	14.71%	3,488
Benton	5,546	53.95%	3,835	37.31%	846	8.23%	13	0.13%	11	0.11%	28	0.27%	1,711	16.64%	10,279
Black Hawk	29,651	55.83%	19,322	36.38%	3,623	6.82%	253	0.48%	36	0.07%	224	0.42%	10,329	19.45%	53,109
Boone	6,446	54.47%	4,293	36.27%	987	8.34%	58	0.49%	13	0.11%	38	0.32%	2,153	18.20%	11,835
Bremer	5,023	49.38%	4,213	41.42%	862	8.47%	33	0.32%	14	0.14%	27	0.27%	810	7.96%	10,172
Buchanan	4,997	55.83%	3,043	34.00%	836	9.34%	20	0.22%	19	0.21%	36	0.40%	1,954	21.83%	8,951
Buena Vista	3,420	42.94%	3,636	45.65%	831	10.43%	19	0.24%	12	0.15%	47	0.59%	-216	-2.71%	7,965
Butler	3,061	46.16%	3,036	45.78%	489	7.37%	12	0.18%	8	0.12%	25	0.38%	25	0.38%	6,631
Calhoun	2,193	45.89%	2,077	43.46%	462	9.67%	16	0.33%	7	0.15%	24	0.50%	116	2.43%	4,779
Carroll	4,333	49.29%	3,392	38.59%	998	11.35%	20	0.23%	11	0.13%	36	0.41%	941	10.70%	8,790
Cass	2,616	38.11%	3,384	49.29%	809	11.78%	15	0.22%	8	0.12%	33	0.48%	-768	-11.18%	6,865
Cedar	3,856	50.23%	2,966	38.64%	756	9.85%	42	0.55%	22	0.29%	34	0.44%	890	11.59%	7,676
Cerro Gordo	11,943	56.26%	7,427	34.99%	1,689	7.96%	60	0.28%	14	0.07%	94	0.44%	4,516	21.27%	21,227
Cherokee	2,853	44.79%	2,629	41.27%	834	13.09%	15	0.24%	6	0.09%	33	0.52%	224	3.52%	6,370
Chickasaw	3,355	52.75%	2,191	34.45%	759	11.93%	14	0.22%	11	0.17%	30	0.47%	1,164	18.30%	6,360
Clarke	2,053	52.33%	1,401	35.71%	440	11.22%	11	0.28%	3	0.08%	15	0.38%	652	16.62%	3,923
Clay	3,659	47.80%	3,129	40.88%	802	10.48%	20	0.26%	8	0.10%	37	0.48%	530	6.92%	7,655
Clayton	4,284	52.28%	2,944	35.93%	912	11.13%	32	0.39%	3	0.04%	19	0.23%	1,340	16.35%	8,194
Clinton	11,481	53.17%	7,624	35.30%	2,300	10.65%	77	0.36%	32	0.15%	81	0.38%	3,857	17.87%	21,595
Crawford	3,140	46.76%	2,686	40.00%	847	12.61%	10	0.15%	8	0.12%	24	0.36%	454	6.76%	6,715
Dallas	8,017	50.07%	6,647	41.52%	1,198	7.48%	55	0.34%	24	0.15%	69	0.43%	1,370	8.55%	16,010
Davis	1,894	50.39%	1,445	38.44%	382	10.16%	10	0.27%	8	0.21%	20	0.53%	449	11.95%	3,759
Decatur	1,846	50.95%	1,287	35.52%	452	12.48%	17	0.47%	4	0.11%	17	0.47%	559	15.43%	3,623
Delaware	3,704	49.41%	3,065	40.88%	679	9.06%	20	0.27%	4	0.05%	25	0.33%	639	8.53%	7,497
Des Moines	10,761	57.94%	5,778	31.11%	1,792	9.65%	83	0.45%	31	0.17%	129	0.69%	4,983	26.83%	18,574
Dickinson	3,562	46.59%	3,129	40.92%	901	11.78%	23	0.30%	10	0.13%	21	0.27%	433	5.67%	7,646
Dubuque	20,839	54.77%	13,391	35.19%	3,304	8.68%	254	0.67%	66	0.17%	197	0.52%	7,448	19.58%	38,051
Emmet	2,270	51.46%	1,641	37.20%	470	10.66%	11	0.25%	8	0.18%	11	0.25%	629	14.26%	4,411
Fayette	4,832	50.21%	3,848	39.98%	890	9.25%	17	0.18%	9	0.09%	28	0.29%	984	10.23%	9,624
Floyd	3,769	54.73%	2,379	34.54%	689	10.00%	15	0.22%	15	0.22%	20	0.29%	1,390	20.19%	6,887
Franklin	2,232	47.16%	2,054	43.40%	417	8.81%	14	0.30%	5	0.11%	11	0.23%	178	3.76%	4,733
Fremont	1,481	41.58%	1,576	44.24%	480	13.48%	3	0.08%	6	0.17%	16	0.45%	-95	-2.66%	3,562
Greene	2,519	52.49%	1,861	38.78%	396	8.25%	9	0.19%	1	0.02%	13	0.27%	658	13.71%	4,799
Grundy	2,322	40.83%	2,928	51.49%	401	7.05%	11	0.19%	3	0.05%	22	0.39%	-606	-10.66%	5,687
Guthrie	2,552	49.65%	2,034	39.57%	515	10.02%	11	0.21%	4	0.08%	24	0.47%	518	10.08%	5,140
Hamilton	3,455	47.48%	3,109	42.72%	661	9.08%	23	0.32%	7	0.10%	22	0.30%	346	4.76%	7,277
Hancock	2,399	45.19%	2,353	44.32%	529	9.96%	11	0.21%	6	0.11%	11	0.21%	46	0.87%	5,309
Hardin	4,053	48.69%	3,505	42.11%	713	8.57%	25	0.30%	5	0.06%	23	0.28%	548	6.58%	8,324
Harrison	2,576	39.47%	3,070	47.04%	820	12.56%	10	0.15%	14	0.21%	37	0.57%	-494	-7.57%	6,527
Henry	3,798	45.90%	3,478	42.03%	914	11.05%	23	0.28%	24	0.29%	38	0.46%	320	3.87%	8,275
Howard	2,303	52.28%	1,528	34.69%	555	12.60%	3	0.07%	2	0.05%	14	0.32%	775	17.59%	4,405
Humboldt	2,080	42.17%	2,236	45.33%	590	11.96%	9	0.18%	4	0.08%	14	0.28%	-156	-3.16%	4,933
Ida	1,589	42.58%	1,684	45.12%	436	11.68%	6	0.16%	3	0.08%	14	0.38%	-95	-2.54%	3,732
Iowa	3,354	47.68%	3,042	43.24%	575	8.17%	24	0.34%	11	0.16%	29	0.41%	312	4.44%	7,035
Jackson	4,609	54.47%	2,827	33.41%	936	11.06%	37	0.44%	18	0.21%	34	0.40%	1,782	21.06%	8,461
Jasper	8,776	52.92%	6,414	38.67%	1,263	7.62%	63	0.38%	18	0.11%	51	0.31%	2,362	14.25%	16,585
Jefferson	2,597	35.11%	2,541	34.35%	571	7.72%	47	0.64%	1,574	21.28%	67	0.91%	56	0.76%	7,397
Johnson	27,888	60.98%	13,402	29.31%	2,313	5.06%	1,491	3.26%	199	0.44%	439	0.96%	14,486	31.67%	45,732
Jones	4,668	54.40%	3,083	35.93%	765	8.92%	27	0.31%	6	0.07%	32	0.37%	1,585	18.47%	8,581
Keokuk	2,545	49.89%	2,080	40.78%	432	8.47%	10	0.20%	10	0.20%	24	0.47%	465	9.11%	5,101
Kossuth	4,031	47.40%	3,477	40.88%	932	10.96%	23	0.27%	16	0.19%	26	0.31%	554	6.52%	8,505
Lee	8,831	56.38%	4,932	31.49%	1,734	11.07%	64	0.41%	27	0.17%	74	0.47%	3,899	24.89%	15,662
Linn	45,497	54.79%	30,958	37.28%	5,607	6.75%	453	0.55%	91	0.11%	429	0.52%	14,539	17.51%	83,035
Louisa	2,081	48.68%	1,565	36.61%	590	13.80%	7	0.16%	6	0.14%	26	0.61%	516	12.07%	4,275
Lucas	2,168	51.51%	1,586	37.68%	433	10.29%	6	0.14%	3	0.07%	13	0.31%	582	13.83%	4,209
Lyon	1,489	27.82%	3,396	63.45%	422	7.88%	12	0.22%	7	0.13%	26	0.49%	-1,907	-35.63%	5,352
Madison	3,070	48.52%	2,550	40.30%	654	10.34%	18	0.28%	6	0.09%	29	0.46%	520	8.22%	6,327
Mahaska	3,737	41.80%	4,473	50.03%	656	7.34%	24	0.27%	17	0.19%	34	0.38%	-736	-8.23%	8,941
Marion	5,978	45.80%	6,100	46.74%	871	6.67%	52	0.40%	14	0.11%	37	0.28%	-122	-0.94%	13,052
Marshall	8,669	50.04%	7,017	40.50%	1,455	8.40%	80	0.46%	26	0.15%	77	0.44%	1,652	9.54%	17,324
Mills	2,068	35.83%	2,958	51.25%	683	11.83%	17	0.29%	10	0.17%	36	0.62%	-890	-15.42%	5,772
Mitchell	2,596	51.19%	1,877	37.01%	563	11.10%	16	0.32%	7	0.14%	12	0.24%	719	14.18%	5,071
Monona	1,952	46.06%	1,674	39.50%	580	13.69%	11	0.26%	8	0.19%	13	0.31%	278	6.56%	4,238
Monroe	1,884	53.63%	1,272	36.21%	329	9.37%	9	0.26%	7	0.20%	12	0.34%	612	17.42%	3,513
Montgomery	1,912	36.79%	2,583	49.70%	663	12.76%	5	0.10%	13	0.25%	21	0.40%	-671	-12.91%	5,197
Muscatine	7,674	49.88%	5,858	38.07%	1,705	11.08%	68	0.44%	21	0.14%	60	0.39%	1,816	11.81%	15,386
O'Brien	2,236	33.20%	3,877	57.56%	578	8.58%	13	0.19%	8	0.12%	23	0.34%	-1,641	-24.36%	6,735
Osceola	1,010	33.10%	1,736	56.90%	274	8.98%	6	0.20%	2	0.07%	23	0.75%	-726	-23.80%	3,051
Page	2,220	31.52%	4,032	57.25%	753	10.69%	16	0.23%	11	0.16%	11	0.16%	-1,812	-25.73%	7,043
Palo Alto	2,371	50.41%	1,817	38.63%	477	10.14%	11	0.23%	4	0.09%	23	0.49%	554	11.78%	4,703
Plymouth	3,745	37.62%	5,117	51.40%	997	10.01%	16	0.16%	12	0.12%	69	0.69%	-1,372	-13.78%	9,956
Pocahontas	1,981	47.00%	1,707	40.50%	478	11.34%	9	0.21%	8	0.19%	32	0.76%	274	6.50%	4,215
Polk	83,877	53.73%	60,884	39.00%	9,516	6.10%	786	0.50%	197	0.13%	846	0.54%	22,993	14.73%	156,106
Pottawattamie	13,276	40.45%	15,648	47.68%	3,534	10.77%	96	0.29%	66	0.20%	201	0.61%	-2,372	-7.23%	32,821
Poweshiek	4,183	50.93%	3,221	39.21%	681	8.29%	73	0.89%	12	0.15%	44	0.54%	962	11.72%	8,214
Ringgold	1,439	52.52%	967	35.29%	310	11.31%	8	0.29%	5	0.18%	11	0.40%	472	17.23%	2,740
Sac	2,170	43.43%	2,209	44.21%	579	11.59%	15	0.30%	3	0.06%	21	0.42%	-39	-0.78%	4,997
Scott	32,694	50.14%	26,751	41.03%	4,991	7.65%	295	0.45%	86	0.13%	385	0.59%	5,943	9.11%	65,202
Shelby	2,176	36.63%	3,056	51.44%	652	10.97%	16	0.27%	8	0.13%	33	0.56%	-880	-14.81%	5,941
Sioux	2,392	16.95%	10,864	77.00%	718	5.09%	42	0.30%	9	0.06%	85	0.60%	-8,472	-60.05%	14,110
Story	17,234	52.71%	12,468	38.13%	2,091	6.40%	601	1.84%	59	0.18%	242	0.74%	4,766	14.58%	32,695
Tama	3,994	51.52%	2,986	38.52%	713	9.20%	18	0.23%	13	0.17%	28	0.36%	1,008	13.00%	7,752
Taylor	1,458	44.51%	1,419	43.32%	379	11.57%	7	0.21%	1	0.03%	12	0.37%	39	1.19%	3,276
Union	2,787	49.27%	2,156	38.11%	660	11.67%	18	0.32%	2	0.04%	34	0.60%	631	11.16%	5,657
Van Buren	1,536	45.51%	1,460	43.26%	347	10.28%	6	0.18%	8	0.24%	18	0.53%	76	2.25%	3,375
Wapello	8,437	57.12%	4,828	32.69%	1,376	9.32%	54	0.37%	29	0.20%	46	0.31%	3,609	24.43%	14,770
Warren	9,120	52.20%	6,905	39.52%	1,267	7.25%	61	0.35%	20	0.11%	99	0.57%	2,215	12.68%	17,472
Washington	3,828	46.84%	3,600	44.05%	636	7.78%	38	0.46%	27	0.33%	44	0.54%	228	2.79%	8,173
Wayne	1,650	50.51%	1,295	39.64%	310	9.49%	3	0.09%	4	0.12%	5	0.15%	355	10.87%	3,267
Webster	8,380	51.32%	6,275	38.43%	1,580	9.68%	40	0.24%	9	0.06%	44	0.27%	2,105	12.89%	16,328
Winnebago	2,679	48.52%	2,211	40.05%	590	10.69%	10	0.18%	8	0.14%	23	0.42%	468	8.47%	5,521
Winneshiek	4,122	47.00%	3,532	40.27%	973	11.09%	102	1.16%	14	0.16%	27	0.31%	590	6.73%	8,770
Woodbury	17,224	45.97%	16,368	43.69%	3,436	9.17%	142	0.38%	72	0.19%	222	0.59%	856	2.28%	37,464
Worth	2,293	57.15%	1,284	32.00%	403	10.04%	14	0.35%	5	0.12%	13	0.32%	1,009	25.15%	4,012
Wright	2,912	48.87%	2,473	41.50%	536	8.99%	9	0.15%	4	0.07%	25	0.42%	439	7.37%	5,959
Totals	620,258	50.26%	492,644	39.92%	105,159	8.52%	6,550	0.53%	3,349	0.27%	6,115	0.50%	127,614	10.34%	1,234,075

==== Counties that flipped from Republican to Democratic ====
- Adair
- Allamakee
- Butler
- Calhoun
- Cherokee
- Delaware
- Dickinson
- Franklin
- Hancock
- Iowa
- Washington
- Winnebago
- Woodbury

=== Results by congressional district ===
Clinton won 4 out of 5 congressional districts, including three that elected Republicans.

District	Dole	Clinton	Perot	Representative
1st	36.7%	54.0%	7.6%	Jim Leach
2nd	37.4%	52.9%	8.8%	Jim Nussle
3rd	39.0%	50.4%	8.8%	Jim Ross Lightfoot
3rd	39.0%	50.4%	8.8%	Leonard Boswell
4th	41.7%	49.4%	7.9%	Greg Ganske
5th	45.1%	44.3%	9.8%	Tom Latham

== See also ==
- United States presidential elections in Iowa
