= 1996 United States presidential election in Indiana =

- November 5, 1996
- Turnout: 55.8% ▼7.2 pp

Nominee	Bob Dole	Bill Clinton	Ross Perot
Party	Republican	Democratic	Reform
Home state	Kansas	Arkansas	Texas
Running mate	Jack Kemp	Al Gore	James Campbell (Note: Campbell was listed as Perot's running mate in Indiana, in place of the Reform Party's national vice presidential candidate, Pat Choate.)
Electoral vote	12	0	0
Popular vote	1,006,693	887,424	224,299
Percentage	47.13%	41.55%	10.50%

Dole
40–50%
50–60%
60–70%
Clinton
40–50%
50–60%
60–70%
President before election
Bill Clinton
Democratic
Elected President
Bill Clinton
Democratic

A presidential election was held in Indiana on November 5, 1996, as part of the 1996 United States presidential election. The Republican ticket of the senior U.S. senator from Kansas Bob Dole and the former U.S. secretary of housing and urban development Jack Kemp defeated the Democratic ticket of the incumbent president of the United States Bill Clinton and the vice president of the United States Al Gore. The Reform ticket of the businessman Ross Perot and James Campbell finished third. Clinton defeated Dole and Perot in the national election with 379 electoral votes.

== Primary elections ==
=== Republican primary ===
Indiana Republican primary, May 7, 1996
Party	Candidate	Votes	%
Republican	Bob Dole	365,860	70.78
Republican	Pat Buchanan	100,245	19.39
Republican	Steve Forbes (withdrawn)	50,802	9.83
Total votes		516,907	100.00

=== Democratic primary ===
Indiana Democratic primary, May 7, 1996
Party	Candidate	Votes	%
Democratic	Bill Clinton	329,536	100.00
Total votes		329,536	100.00

=== Reform Party ===
Indiana Reform primary, August 11–17, 1996
Party	Candidate	Votes	%
Reform	Ross Perot	773	73.62
Reform	Richard Lamm	277	26.38
Total votes		1,050	100.00

== General election ==
=== Statistics ===
Clinton carried Porter County, Indiana, which had previously supported the Republican presidential candidate in every election since the party's founding, ending the second-longest Republican streak in U.S. presidential politics. (The longest, Carroll County, Illinois's, would remain unbroken until the 2008 United States presidential election.) As of the 2024, this is the most recent presidential election in which Blackford, Clark, Crawford, Floyd, Gibson, Jefferson, Knox, Pike, Posey, Sullivan, Switzerland, and Warrick counties voted for the Democratic ticket.

=== Results ===
1996 United States presidential election in Indiana
Party	Candidate	Votes	%	±%
Republican	Bob Dole Jack Kemp	1,006,693	47.13	▲4.22
Democratic	Bill Clinton Al Gore	887,424	41.55	▲4.76
Reform	Ross Perot James Campbell	224,299	10.50	▼9.27
Libertarian	Harry Browne Jo Jorgensen	15,632	0.73	▲0.39
Greens/GPUSA	Ralph Nader (write-in) N/A (Note: Nader had no registered running mate in Indiana.)	1,121	0.05	▲0.05
U.S. Taxpayers'	Howard Phillips (write-in) N/A (Note: Phillips had no registered running mate in Indiana.)	453	0.02	▲0.02
Natural Law	John Hagelin (write-in) Mike Tompkins (write-in)	120	0.01	Steady
Socialist	Mary Cal Hollis (write-in) Eric Chester (write-in)	60	0.00	Steady
Independent	Charles E. Collins (write-in) Rosemary Giumarra (write-in)	22	0.00	▲0.00
Independent	David H. Birchler (write-in) N/A (Note: Birchler had no registered running mate in Indiana.)	18	0.00	▲0.00
Total votes		2,135,842	100.00	

=== Results by county ===
County	Bob Dole Republican		Bill Clinton Democratic		Ross Perot Reform		Others		Margin		Totals
County	Votes	%	Votes	%	Votes	%	Votes	%	Votes	%	Totals
Adams	6,960	55.08%	4,247	33.61%	1,346	10.65%	84	0.66%	2,713	21.47%	12,637
Allen	59,255	53.55%	41,450	37.46%	8,808	7.96%	1,132	1.03%	17,805	16.09%	110,645
Bartholomew	13,188	51.60%	9,301	36.39%	2,815	11.01%	254	1.00%	3,887	15.21%	25,558
Benton	1,947	49.92%	1,311	33.62%	609	15.62%	33	0.84%	636	16.30%	3,900
Blackford	2,070	40.35%	2,335	45.52%	681	13.27%	44	0.86%	-265	-5.17%	5,130
Boone	11,338	64.44%	4,625	26.28%	1,498	8.51%	135	0.77%	6,713	38.16%	17,596
Brown	2,988	47.36%	2,413	38.25%	802	12.71%	106	1.68%	575	9.11%	6,309
Carroll	4,062	50.58%	2,747	34.20%	1,171	14.58%	51	0.64%	1,315	16.38%	8,031
Cass	8,020	51.28%	5,419	34.65%	2,029	13.12%	173	0.95%	2,601	16.63%	15,641
Clark	14,396	40.08%	17,799	49.56%	3,578	9.96%	143	0.40%	-3,403	-9.48%	35,916
Clay	4,858	49.00%	3,605	36.36%	1,406	14.18%	46	0.46%	1,253	12.64%	9,915
Clinton	6,156	53.20%	3,949	34.13%	1,355	11.71%	111	0.96%	2,207	19.07%	11,571
Crawford	1,759	36.57%	2,324	48.32%	700	14.55%	27	0.56%	-565	-11.75%	4,810
Daviess	5,531	56.35%	3,230	32.91%	994	10.13%	60	0.61%	2,301	23.44%	9,815
Dearborn	8,318	50.60%	6,269	38.13%	1,731	10.53%	121	0.74%	2,049	12.47%	16,439
Decatur	4,782	50.82%	3,190	33.90%	1,389	14.76%	48	0.52%	1,592	16.92%	9,409
DeKalb	6,851	51.36%	4,840	36.28%	1,534	11.50%	114	0.86%	2,011	15.08%	13,339
Delaware	18,126	40.40%	20,385	45.44%	6,042	13.47%	310	0.69%	-2,259	-5.04%	44,863
Dubois	6,840	44.85%	6,499	42.62%	1,777	11.65%	134	0.88%	341	2.23%	15,250
Elkhart	28,770	56.58%	16,598	32.64%	5,133	10.09%	349	0.69%	12,172	23.94%	50,850
Fayette	4,091	44.86%	3,822	41.91%	1,137	12.47%	70	0.76%	269	2.95%	9,120
Floyd	12,473	42.90%	13,814	47.52%	2,609	8.97%	176	0.61%	-1,341	-4.62%	29,072
Fountain	3,984	54.03%	2,327	31.56%	1,033	14.01%	30	0.40%	1,657	22.47%	7,374
Franklin	4,167	52.25%	2,808	35.21%	943	11.82%	57	0.72%	1,359	17.04%	7,975
Fulton	3,934	48.75%	2,956	36.63%	1,143	14.16%	37	0.46%	978	12.12%	8,070
Gibson	5,392	39.86%	6,488	47.96%	1,585	11.72%	63	0.46%	-1,096	-8.10%	13,528
Grant	13,443	50.77%	9,818	37.08%	3,008	11.36%	209	0.79%	3,625	13.69%	26,478
Greene	5,746	44.67%	5,277	41.03%	1,690	13.14%	149	1.16%	469	3.64%	12,862
Hamilton	42,792	69.45%	14,153	22.97%	4,234	6.87%	440	0.71%	28,639	46.48%	61,619
Hancock	12,907	60.23%	6,123	28.57%	2,258	10.54%	140	0.66%	6,784	31.66%	21,428
Harrison	6,073	43.74%	5,900	42.49%	1,839	13.24%	73	0.53%	173	1.25%	13,885
Hendricks	22,293	63.15%	9,392	26.60%	3,405	9.65%	213	0.60%	12,901	36.55%	35,303
Henry	8,537	45.67%	7,667	41.02%	2,381	12.74%	106	0.57%	870	4.65%	18,691
Howard	16,771	50.51%	11,999	36.14%	4,172	12.56%	263	0.79%	4,772	14.37%	33,205
Huntington	8,275	58.79%	4,287	30.46%	1,400	9.95%	114	0.80%	3,988	28.33%	14,076
Jackson	5,883	46.41%	5,150	40.63%	1,590	12.54%	52	0.41%	733	5.78%	12,675
Jasper	5,173	51.33%	3,554	35.27%	1,271	12.61%	79	0.79%	1,619	16.06%	10,077
Jay	3,584	44.71%	3,356	41.86%	1,022	12.75%	55	0.68%	228	2.85%	8,017
Jefferson	4,827	40.96%	5,441	46.17%	1,438	12.20%	79	0.67%	-614	-5.21%	11,785
Jennings	4,461	42.81%	4,223	40.53%	1,629	15.63%	107	1.03%	238	2.28%	10,420
Johnson	23,733	60.45%	11,278	28.73%	3,975	10.13%	273	0.69%	12,455	31.72%	39,259
Knox	6,395	41.17%	7,003	45.09%	2,022	13.02%	112	0.72%	-608	-3.92%	15,532
Kosciusko	15,084	62.99%	6,166	25.75%	2,531	10.57%	164	0.69%	8,918	37.24%	23,945
LaGrange	4,033	52.11%	2,704	34.94%	949	12.26%	54	0.69%	1,329	17.17%	7,740
Lake	47,873	29.22%	100,198	61.15%	15,051	9.19%	738	0.44%	-52,325	-31.93%	163,860
LaPorte	14,106	35.82%	19,879	50.48%	5,133	13.04%	259	0.66%	-5,773	-14.66%	39,377
Lawrence	8,107	50.64%	5,703	35.62%	2,063	12.89%	136	0.85%	2,404	15.02%	16,009
Madison	23,151	43.10%	23,772	44.25%	6,447	12.00%	350	0.65%	-621	-1.15%	53,720
Marion	133,329	47.24%	124,448	44.10%	21,358	7.57%	3,079	1.09%	8,881	3.14%	282,214
Marshall	8,158	52.84%	5,486	35.53%	1,698	11.00%	98	0.63%	2,672	17.31%	15,440
Martin	2,281	48.33%	1,848	39.15%	485	10.28%	106	2.24%	433	9.18%	4,720
Miami	6,719	52.66%	4,260	33.39%	1,657	12.99%	124	0.96%	2,459	19.27%	12,760
Monroe	16,744	42.27%	18,531	46.78%	3,179	8.03%	1,155	2.92%	-1,787	-4.51%	39,609
Montgomery	7,705	57.51%	3,825	28.55%	1,766	13.18%	101	0.76%	3,880	28.96%	13,397
Morgan	12,872	59.60%	5,812	26.91%	2,755	12.76%	157	0.73%	7,060	32.69%	21,596
Newton	2,075	43.14%	1,897	39.44%	801	16.65%	37	0.77%	178	3.70%	4,810
Noble	6,782	50.17%	5,101	37.73%	1,521	11.25%	115	0.85%	1,681	12.44%	13,519
Ohio	1,098	44.38%	1,083	43.78%	281	11.36%	12	0.48%	15	0.60%	2,474
Orange	3,355	45.69%	3,016	41.07%	938	12.77%	34	0.47%	339	4.62%	7,343
Owen	3,056	48.77%	2,244	35.81%	874	13.95%	92	1.47%	812	12.96%	6,266
Parke	3,151	47.61%	2,453	37.06%	981	14.82%	34	0.51%	698	10.55%	6,619
Perry	2,554	32.21%	4,427	55.83%	913	11.51%	36	0.45%	-1,873	-23.62%	7,930
Pike	2,174	37.02%	2,780	47.34%	884	15.05%	34	0.59%	-606	-10.32%	5,872
Porter	22,931	42.00%	24,044	44.04%	7,169	13.13%	457	0.83%	-1,113	-2.04%	54,601
Posey	4,638	42.34%	4,965	45.33%	1,304	11.90%	47	0.43%	-327	-2.99%	10,954
Pulaski	2,693	49.95%	2,010	37.28%	634	11.76%	54	1.01%	683	12.67%	5,391
Putnam	5,958	51.29%	3,962	34.11%	1,619	13.94%	77	0.66%	1,996	17.18%	11,616
Randolph	4,708	45.18%	4,087	39.22%	1,557	14.94%	68	0.66%	621	5.96%	10,420
Ripley	5,303	49.67%	4,097	38.38%	1,216	11.39%	60	0.56%	1,206	11.29%	10,676
Rush	3,827	51.52%	2,578	34.71%	973	13.10%	50	0.67%	1,249	16.81%	7,428
Scott	2,620	36.35%	3,798	52.70%	760	10.55%	29	0.40%	-1,178	-16.35%	7,207
Shelby	7,778	51.37%	5,374	35.49%	1,874	12.38%	116	0.76%	2,404	15.88%	15,142
Spencer	3,770	43.74%	4,058	47.08%	739	8.57%	53	0.61%	-288	-3.34%	8,620
St. Joseph	38,281	41.08%	45,704	49.04%	8,379	8.99%	824	0.89%	-7,423	-7.96%	93,188
Starke	3,108	38.13%	3,854	47.29%	1,096	13.45%	92	1.13%	-746	-9.16%	8,150
Steuben	5,513	49.53%	4,124	37.05%	1,390	12.49%	103	0.93%	1,389	12.48%	11,130
Sullivan	3,207	37.11%	4,076	47.17%	1,178	13.63%	181	2.09%	-869	-10.06%	8,642
Switzerland	1,266	39.72%	1,496	46.94%	403	12.65%	22	0.69%	-230	-7.22%	3,187
Tippecanoe	22,556	49.48%	17,232	37.80%	5,394	11.83%	404	0.89%	5,324	11.68%	45,586
Tipton	3,980	53.89%	2,478	33.55%	861	11.66%	66	0.90%	1,502	20.34%	7,385
Union	1,334	48.86%	1,019	37.33%	364	13.33%	13	0.48%	315	11.53%	2,730
Vanderburgh	28,509	43.22%	30,934	46.90%	6,132	9.30%	386	0.58%	-2,425	-3.68%	65,961
Vermillion	2,334	35.08%	3,251	48.87%	1,029	15.47%	39	0.58%	-917	-13.79%	6,653
Vigo	15,751	40.91%	17,974	46.69%	4,508	11.71%	266	0.69%	-2,223	-5.78%	38,499
Wabash	6,990	53.79%	4,577	35.22%	1,294	9.96%	135	1.03%	2,413	18.57%	12,996
Warren	1,678	46.01%	1,394	38.22%	560	15.36%	15	0.41%	284	7.79%	3,647
Warrick	9,221	43.68%	9,285	43.99%	2,471	11.71%	132	0.62%	-64	-0.31%	21,109
Washington	4,066	44.14%	3,819	41.46%	1,264	13.72%	62	0.68%	247	2.68%	9,211
Wayne	12,188	47.24%	10,905	42.27%	2,525	9.79%	183	0.70%	1,283	4.97%	25,801
Wells	6,322	55.98%	3,752	33.22%	1,157	10.24%	63	0.56%	2,570	22.76%	11,294
White	4,642	47.87%	3,396	35.02%	1,610	16.60%	50	0.51%	1,246	12.85%	9,698
Whitley	5,965	51.31%	4,176	35.92%	1,392	11.97%	92	0.80%	1,789	15.39%	11,625
Totals	1,006,693	47.13%	887,424	41.55%	224,299	10.50%	17,426	0.82%	119,269	5.58%	2,135,842

==== Counties that flipped from Democratic to Republican ====
- Greene
- Harrison
- Washington

==== Counties that flipped from Republican to Democratic ====
- Blackford
- Delaware
- Madison
- Porter

=== Results by congressional district ===
1996 United States presidential election in Indiana by congressional district
District	Dole	Clinton	Perot	Representative
1st	31.5%	58.6%	9.8%	Pete Visclosky
2nd	45.7%	41.8%	12.4%	David McIntosh
3rd	46.1%	43.7%	10.3%	Tim Roemer
4th	53.8%	36.6%	9.6%	Mark Souder
5th	50.0%	37.0%	13.0%	Steve Buyer
6th	63.3%	28.3%	8.4%	Dan Burton
7th	52.5%	35.4%	12.1%	John T. Myers
7th	52.5%	35.4%	12.1%	Ed Pease
8th	43.9%	45.3%	10.8%	John Hostettler
9th	43.9%	44.6%	11.5%	Lee Hamilton
10th	37.7	54.7%	7.6%	Andrew Jacobs Jr.
10th	37.7	54.7%	7.6%	Julia Carson

== See also ==
- United States presidential elections in Indiana

== Bibliography ==
- Congressional Quarterly (2010). Congressional Quarterly's Guide to U.S. Elections (6th ed.). Washington D.C.: Congressional Quarterly.
- Casper, Lynne M.; Bass, Loretta E. (1998). Voting and Registration in the Election of November 1996. Washington, D.C.: United States Department of Commerce.
- Gilroy, Sue Anne (1996). 1996 Election Report State of Indiana. Indianapolis: Indiana Secretary of State.
- Menendez, Albert J. (2009). The Geography of Presidential Elections in the United States, 1868–2004. Jefferson, NC: McFarland and Company.
- Park-Egan, Kiernan (n.d.). "1996 Presidential General Election Results, Results by Congressional District". Atlas of U.S. Presidential Election Results.
- Sullivan, Robert David (June 29, 2016). "How the Red and Blue Map Evolved over the Past Century". America.
