= 1996 United States presidential election in Missouri =

- November 5, 1996

Nominee	Bill Clinton	Bob Dole	Ross Perot
Party	Democratic	Republican	Reform
Home state	Arkansas	Kansas	Texas
Running mate	Al Gore	Jack Kemp	Pat Choate
Electoral vote	11	0	0
Popular vote	1,025,935	890,016	217,188
Percentage	47.54%	41.24%	10.06%

Clinton
40–50%
50–60%
60–70%
70–80%
Dole
40–50%
50–60%
President before election
Bill Clinton
Democratic
Elected President
Bill Clinton
Democratic

The 1996 United States presidential election in Missouri took place on November 5, 1996, as part of the 1996 United States presidential election. Voters chose eleven representatives, or electors to the Electoral College, who voted for president and vice president.

Missouri was won by incumbent President Bill Clinton (D-AR) over Senator Bob Dole (R-KS), with Clinton winning 47.54% to Dole's 41.24% for a winning margin of 6.3%. Billionaire businessman Ross Perot (Reform-TX) finished in third, with 10.06% of the popular vote. From 1904 to 2004, the state was carried by the winner of the presidential election each time with the exception of 1956. The state was carried by the Republicans in 2000, and continued to move rightward in future elections with its white, rural, culturally conservative population following in the direction of neighboring Southern states like Arkansas. Missouri lost its bellwether status after voting significantly more Republican than the nation since 2008. The state did nearly vote for Barack Obama in 2008.

1996 marked the most recent time in which Missouri has voted Democratic, as well as the last time that Hickory, Benton, Mercer, Caldwell, Grundy, Crawford, Carroll, Franklin, St. Clair, Livingston, DeKalb, Lafayette, St. Francois, Daviess, Bates, Madison, Montgomery, Sullivan, Clark, Nodaway, Henry, Vernon, Gentry, Macon, Knox, Wayne, Ripley, Clinton, Monroe, Ralls, Randolph, Dunklin, Reynolds, Oregon, Howard, Shannon, Shelby, Callaway, Scott, Lincoln, Audrain, Pike, Marion, Lewis, Scotland, Schuyler, Chariton, Worth, and Linn Counties voted for a Democratic presidential candidate.

== Results ==
1996 United States presidential election in Missouri
Party	Candidate	Running mate	Votes	Percentage	Electoral votes
Democratic	Bill Clinton (incumbent)	Al Gore (incumbent)	1,025,935	47.54%	11
Republican	Robert Dole	Jack Kemp	890,016	41.24%	0
Reform	Ross Perot	Patrick Choate	217,188	10.06%	0
U.S. Taxpayer	Howard Phillips	Herbert Titus	11,521	0.53%	0
Libertarian	Harry Browne	Jo Jorgensen	10,522	0.49%	0
Natural Law	Dr. John Hagelin	Dr. V. Tompkins	2,287	0.11%	0
Write-in	Ralph Nader	Winona LaDuke	534	0.02%	0
Write-in	Charles Collins	Rosemary Giumarra	62	0.00%	0

=== Results by county ===
County	Bill Clinton Democratic		Bob Dole Republican		Ross Perot Reform		Various candidates Other parties		Margin		Total votes cast
County	#	%	#	%	#	%	#	%	#	%	Total votes cast
Adair	4,441	42.71%	4,656	44.78%	1,170	11.25%	130	1.25%	-215	-2.07%	10,397
Andrew	2,807	39.53%	3,281	46.20%	964	13.58%	49	0.69%	-474	-6.67%	7,101
Atchison	1,266	42.51%	1,327	44.56%	367	12.32%	18	0.60%	-61	-2.05%	2,978
Audrain	4,690	47.96%	3,955	40.45%	1,046	10.70%	87	0.89%	735	7.51%	9,778
Barry	4,352	36.88%	5,855	49.62%	1,494	12.66%	98	0.83%	-1,503	-12.74%	11,799
Barton	1,625	32.21%	2,812	55.74%	563	11.16%	45	0.89%	-1,187	-23.53%	5,045
Bates	3,224	45.17%	2,904	40.69%	949	13.30%	60	0.84%	320	4.48%	7,137
Benton	2,996	44.62%	2,895	43.11%	764	11.38%	60	0.89%	101	1.51%	6,715
Bollinger	2,044	40.50%	2,420	47.95%	506	10.03%	77	1.53%	-376	-7.45%	5,047
Boone	24,984	48.12%	22,047	42.46%	4,083	7.86%	806	1.55%	2,937	5.66%	51,920
Buchanan	15,848	48.00%	12,610	38.19%	4,248	12.87%	312	0.94%	3,238	9.81%	33,018
Butler	5,780	40.30%	6,996	48.78%	1,414	9.86%	153	1.07%	-1,216	-8.48%	14,343
Caldwell	1,487	42.88%	1,464	42.21%	468	13.49%	49	1.41%	23	0.67%	3,468
Callaway	5,880	44.76%	5,567	42.38%	1,530	11.65%	160	1.22%	313	2.38%	13,137
Camden	5,566	37.88%	7,190	48.93%	1,809	12.31%	129	0.88%	-1,624	-11.05%	14,694
Cape Girardeau	9,957	36.05%	15,557	56.32%	1,861	6.74%	247	0.89%	-5,600	-20.27%	27,622
Carroll	2,080	46.07%	1,839	40.73%	580	12.85%	16	0.35%	241	5.34%	4,515
Carter	1,172	43.78%	1,180	44.08%	301	11.24%	24	0.90%	-8	-0.30%	2,677
Cass	11,743	40.48%	13,495	46.52%	3,474	11.98%	298	1.03%	-1,752	-6.04%	29,010
Cedar	2,027	38.82%	2,484	47.57%	658	12.60%	53	1.01%	-457	-8.75%	5,222
Chariton	2,072	51.39%	1,508	37.40%	423	10.49%	29	0.72%	564	13.99%	4,032
Christian	6,627	35.64%	9,477	50.97%	2,301	12.37%	190	1.02%	-2,850	-15.33%	18,595
Clark	1,749	52.79%	1,081	32.63%	458	13.82%	25	0.75%	668	20.16%	3,313
Clay	32,603	47.15%	28,935	41.85%	7,048	10.19%	561	0.81%	3,668	5.30%	69,147
Clinton	3,445	48.08%	2,780	38.80%	848	11.84%	92	1.28%	665	9.28%	7,165
Cole	10,857	37.00%	16,140	55.01%	2,121	7.23%	224	0.76%	-5,283	-18.01%	29,342
Cooper	2,753	41.53%	2,900	43.75%	891	13.44%	85	1.28%	-147	-2.22%	6,629
Crawford	3,349	43.74%	2,990	39.05%	1,223	15.97%	94	1.23%	359	4.69%	7,656
Dade	1,243	35.06%	1,822	51.40%	447	12.61%	33	0.93%	-579	-16.34%	3,545
Dallas	2,277	40.13%	2,554	45.01%	787	13.87%	56	0.99%	-277	-4.88%	5,674
Daviess	1,534	45.75%	1,321	39.40%	466	13.90%	32	0.95%	213	6.35%	3,353
DeKalb	1,679	43.66%	1,627	42.30%	492	12.79%	48	1.25%	52	1.36%	3,846
Dent	2,234	40.34%	2,542	45.90%	693	12.51%	69	1.25%	-308	-5.56%	5,538
Douglas	1,744	33.64%	2,601	50.17%	775	14.95%	64	1.23%	-857	-16.53%	5,184
Dunklin	5,428	53.36%	3,766	37.02%	934	9.18%	45	0.44%	1,662	16.34%	10,173
Franklin	13,908	41.23%	13,715	40.66%	5,517	16.35%	594	1.76%	193	0.57%	33,734
Gasconade	2,104	35.24%	2,997	50.19%	820	13.73%	50	0.84%	-893	-14.95%	5,971
Gentry	1,493	45.37%	1,361	41.36%	416	12.64%	21	0.64%	132	4.01%	3,291
Greene	39,300	40.45%	48,193	49.60%	8,569	8.82%	1,102	1.13%	-8,893	-9.15%	97,164
Grundy	2,073	44.13%	1,883	40.08%	631	13.43%	111	2.36%	190	4.05%	4,698
Harrison	1,628	41.96%	1,737	44.77%	484	12.47%	31	0.80%	-109	-2.81%	3,880
Henry	4,579	50.11%	3,260	35.68%	1,231	13.47%	67	0.73%	1,319	14.43%	9,137
Hickory	1,858	47.49%	1,491	38.11%	531	13.57%	32	0.82%	367	9.38%	3,912
Holt	1,144	40.77%	1,323	47.15%	314	11.19%	25	0.89%	-179	-6.38%	2,806
Howard	2,014	47.92%	1,545	36.76%	568	13.51%	76	1.81%	469	11.16%	4,203
Howell	5,261	38.90%	5,991	44.30%	2,066	15.28%	206	1.52%	-730	-5.40%	13,524
Iron	2,221	53.39%	1,328	31.92%	568	13.65%	43	1.03%	893	21.47%	4,160
Jackson	140,317	56.20%	85,534	34.26%	21,047	8.43%	2,760	1.11%	54,783	21.94%	249,658
Jasper	11,462	33.95%	18,361	54.39%	3,545	10.50%	393	1.16%	-6,899	-20.44%	33,761
Jefferson	32,073	48.52%	23,877	36.12%	8,893	13.45%	1,259	1.90%	8,196	12.40%	66,102
Johnson	6,220	42.68%	6,276	43.06%	1,911	13.11%	167	1.15%	-56	-0.38%	14,574
Knox	891	44.09%	862	42.65%	254	12.57%	14	0.69%	29	1.44%	2,021
Laclede	4,047	35.19%	5,887	51.20%	1,459	12.69%	106	0.92%	-1,840	-16.01%	11,499
Lafayette	6,118	46.34%	5,489	41.57%	1,516	11.48%	80	0.61%	629	4.77%	13,203
Lawrence	4,465	36.21%	6,099	49.46%	1,613	13.08%	155	1.26%	-1,634	-13.25%	12,332
Lewis	2,050	49.09%	1,453	34.79%	644	15.42%	29	0.69%	597	14.30%	4,176
Lincoln	5,644	44.75%	4,897	38.83%	1,881	14.92%	189	1.50%	747	5.92%	12,611
Linn	2,967	50.36%	2,097	35.60%	781	13.26%	46	0.78%	870	14.76%	5,891
Livingston	2,913	47.52%	2,384	38.89%	777	12.68%	56	0.91%	529	8.63%	6,130
Macon	2,937	45.32%	2,634	40.65%	848	13.09%	61	0.94%	303	4.67%	6,480
Madison	2,351	50.42%	1,595	34.21%	625	13.40%	92	1.97%	756	16.21%	4,663
Maries	1,540	42.35%	1,560	42.90%	516	14.19%	20	0.55%	-20	-0.55%	3,636
Marion	4,924	45.93%	4,653	43.40%	1,082	10.09%	62	0.58%	271	2.53%	10,721
McDonald	1,980	33.15%	3,008	50.36%	923	15.45%	62	1.04%	-1,028	-17.21%	5,973
Mercer	700	44.28%	660	41.75%	208	13.16%	13	0.82%	40	2.53%	1,581
Miller	3,110	35.59%	4,387	50.20%	1,185	13.56%	57	0.65%	-1,277	-14.61%	8,739
Mississippi	3,235	61.63%	1,595	30.39%	380	7.24%	39	0.74%	1,640	31.24%	5,249
Moniteau	2,129	38.96%	2,603	47.63%	693	12.68%	40	0.73%	-474	-8.67%	5,465
Monroe	1,938	50.59%	1,333	34.80%	532	13.89%	28	0.73%	605	15.79%	3,831
Montgomery	2,277	43.58%	2,124	40.65%	772	14.78%	52	1.00%	153	2.93%	5,225
Morgan	3,006	42.14%	3,059	42.89%	1,006	14.10%	62	0.87%	-53	-0.75%	7,133
New Madrid	4,451	58.80%	2,417	31.93%	663	8.76%	39	0.52%	2,034	26.87%	7,570
Newton	5,840	32.29%	10,067	55.66%	1,995	11.03%	183	1.01%	-4,227	-23.37%	18,085
Nodaway	3,966	46.87%	3,362	39.74%	1,043	12.33%	90	1.06%	604	7.13%	8,461
Oregon	1,795	46.73%	1,502	39.10%	475	12.37%	69	1.80%	293	7.63%	3,841
Osage	2,045	36.73%	2,890	51.90%	608	10.92%	25	0.45%	-845	-15.17%	5,568
Ozark	1,445	36.22%	1,882	47.18%	595	14.92%	67	1.68%	-437	-10.96%	3,989
Pemiscot	3,371	59.38%	1,820	32.06%	458	8.07%	28	0.49%	1,551	27.32%	5,677
Perry	2,517	37.12%	3,427	50.54%	777	11.46%	60	0.88%	-910	-13.42%	6,781
Pettis	6,057	39.68%	7,336	48.06%	1,716	11.24%	154	1.01%	-1,279	-8.38%	15,263
Phelps	6,405	41.87%	6,990	45.69%	1,703	11.13%	201	1.31%	-585	-3.82%	15,299
Pike	3,495	52.22%	2,209	33.00%	916	13.69%	73	1.09%	1,286	19.22%	6,693
Platte	12,705	43.23%	13,332	45.37%	3,035	10.33%	316	1.08%	-627	-2.14%	29,388
Polk	3,307	36.38%	4,521	49.74%	1,169	12.86%	93	1.02%	-1,214	-13.36%	9,090
Pulaski	3,783	41.67%	4,089	45.04%	1,141	12.57%	66	0.73%	-306	-3.37%	9,079
Putnam	857	38.17%	1,091	48.60%	276	12.29%	21	0.94%	-234	-10.43%	2,245
Ralls	1,998	49.31%	1,513	37.34%	520	12.83%	21	0.52%	485	11.97%	4,052
Randolph	4,502	50.11%	3,274	36.44%	1,130	12.58%	79	0.88%	1,228	13.67%	8,985
Ray	4,714	53.65%	2,884	32.82%	1,113	12.67%	76	0.86%	1,830	20.83%	8,787
Reynolds	1,631	55.10%	903	30.51%	386	13.04%	40	1.35%	728	24.59%	2,960
Ripley	2,081	44.68%	1,988	42.68%	530	11.38%	59	1.27%	93	2.00%	4,658
Saline	4,765	53.82%	2,931	33.10%	1,090	12.31%	68	0.77%	1,834	20.72%	8,854
Schuyler	857	44.34%	777	40.20%	287	14.85%	12	0.62%	80	4.14%	1,933
Scotland	990	47.01%	773	36.70%	326	15.48%	17	0.81%	217	10.31%	2,106
Scott	7,011	45.97%	6,641	43.54%	1,483	9.72%	117	0.77%	370	2.43%	15,252
Shannon	1,882	49.58%	1,339	35.27%	524	13.80%	51	1.34%	543	14.31%	3,796
Shelby	1,410	46.08%	1,213	39.64%	413	13.50%	24	0.78%	197	6.44%	3,060
St. Charles	41,369	40.46%	47,705	46.66%	11,591	11.34%	1,581	1.55%	-6,336	-6.20%	102,246
St. Clair	1,974	44.13%	1,815	40.58%	650	14.53%	34	0.76%	159	3.55%	4,473
St. Francois	9,034	50.96%	6,200	34.98%	2,266	12.78%	226	1.27%	2,834	15.98%	17,726
St. Louis	225,524	48.79%	196,096	42.42%	34,850	7.54%	5,808	1.26%	29,428	6.37%	462,278
St. Louis City	91,233	74.78%	22,121	18.13%	7,276	5.96%	1,373	1.13%	69,112	56.65%	122,003
Ste. Genevieve	3,597	53.47%	2,078	30.89%	942	14.00%	110	1.64%	1,519	22.58%	6,727
Stoddard	4,883	43.69%	5,020	44.92%	1,185	10.60%	88	0.79%	-137	-1.23%	11,176
Stone	3,497	34.42%	5,223	51.40%	1,353	13.32%	88	0.87%	-1,726	-16.98%	10,161
Sullivan	1,402	45.91%	1,275	41.75%	340	11.13%	37	1.21%	127	4.16%	3,054
Taney	4,623	35.13%	6,844	52.01%	1,580	12.01%	113	0.86%	-2,221	-16.88%	13,160
Texas	3,897	41.28%	4,065	43.06%	1,335	14.14%	143	1.51%	-168	-1.78%	9,440
Vernon	3,363	43.82%	3,123	40.70%	1,135	14.79%	53	0.69%	240	3.12%	7,674
Warren	3,443	40.00%	3,768	43.78%	1,254	14.57%	142	1.65%	-325	-3.78%	8,607
Washington	4,315	54.97%	2,259	28.78%	1,169	14.89%	107	1.36%	2,056	26.19%	7,850
Wayne	2,754	48.75%	2,172	38.45%	674	11.93%	49	0.87%	582	10.30%	5,649
Webster	3,855	37.97%	4,958	48.84%	1,214	11.96%	125	1.23%	-1,103	-10.87%	10,152
Worth	572	44.93%	540	42.42%	150	11.78%	11	0.86%	32	2.51%	1,273
Wright	2,280	32.59%	3,754	53.67%	890	12.72%	71	1.02%	-1,474	-21.08%	6,995
Totals	1,025,935	47.54%	890,016	41.24%	217,188	10.06%	24,926	1.16%	135,919	6.30%	2,158,065

==== Counties that flipped from Democratic to Republican ====
- Adair
- Andrew
- Atchison
- Butler
- Carter
- Dallas
- Dent
- Harrison
- Howell
- Johnson
- Maries
- Morgan
- Phelps
- Platte
- Pulaski
- Stoddard
- Texas
- Warren

=== By congressional district ===
Clinton won six of nine congressional districts, including two that elected representatives of other parties, with the remaining three going to Dole, including one that elected a Democrat.

District	Clinton	Dole	Perot	Representative
1st	75%	20%	5%	Bill Clay
2nd	42%	50%	8%	Jim Talent
3rd	49%	39%	11%	Dick Gephardt
4th	42%	46%	12%	Ike Skelton
5th	59%	33%	8%	Karen McCarthy
6th	46%	42%	12%	Pat Danner
7th	37%	52%	11%	Mel Hancock (104th Congress)
7th	37%	52%	11%	Roy Blunt (105th Congress)
8th	46%	43%	11%	Jo Ann Emerson
9th	45%	43%	12%	Harold Volkmer (104th Congress)
9th	45%	43%	12%	Kenny Hulshof (105th Congress)

== See also ==
- United States presidential elections in Missouri
- Presidency of Bill Clinton
