= 1996 United States presidential election in California =

- November 5, 1996
- Turnout: 65.53% (of registered voters) ▼9.79 pp 52.56% (of eligible voters) ▼1.96 pp

Nominee	Bill Clinton	Bob Dole	Ross Perot
Party	Democratic	Republican	Reform
Home state	Arkansas	Kansas	Texas
Running mate	Al Gore	Jack Kemp	James Campbell (Note: On the California, Indiana, Iowa, Kansas, Louisiana, Maine, Maryland, Missouri, Montana, Oregon, South Dakota, Tennessee, and Texas election ballots, James Campbell of California, Perot's former boss at IBM, was listed as a stand-in vice-presidential candidate until Perot decided on Pat Choate as his choice for Vice President.)
Electoral vote	54	0	0
Popular vote	5,119,835	3,828,380	697,847
Percentage	51.10%	38.21%	6.96%
Clinton
40–50%
50–60%
60–70%
70–80%
Dole
40–50%
50–60%
President before election
Bill Clinton
Democratic
Elected President
Bill Clinton
Democratic

The 1996 United States presidential election in California took place on November 5, 1996, as part of the 1996 United States presidential election. Voters chose 54 representatives, or electors to the Electoral College, who voted for president and vice president. California, was won by incumbent President Bill Clinton (D) over Senator Bob Dole (R), with Clinton winning 51.1% to 38.21% by a margin of 12.89%. Billionaire businessman Ross Perot (Reform Party) finished in third, with 6.96% of the popular vote.

California had grown increasingly Democratic relative to the rest of the nation in the prior three elections, culminating in 1992 in Bill Clinton's becoming the first Democrat to carry California since Lyndon Johnson's 1964 landslide. In 1996, Clinton carried California once again by double digits, representing the first time California had voted Democratic in back-to-back elections since 1948. This was also the first time since 1964 that a Democrat won a majority of the vote in California. Nevertheless, Clinton's margin of victory shrank from 13.40% to 12.89%, even as his national margin swelled by 3%. Dole reclaimed eleven counties for the GOP: San Diego, Riverside, Fresno, San Luis Obispo, Butte, Tehama, Tuolumne, Siskiyou, Del Norte, Plumas, and Mariposa. He also carried Trinity County, the one county in the state in which Ross Perot had won a plurality in 1992. Of these counties, San Diego, Riverside, Fresno, and San Luis Obispo cast over 100,000 votes; and San Diego County was the largest county in the country to switch parties in 1996.

In contrast, Clinton flipped no counties in the state from red to blue, making this the first election since 1980 in which no red counties in the state turned blue. Clinton became the first Democrat to win the White House without carrying Fresno County since the county's founding in 1856, and remains the only one to have done so as of 2020. He also became the first Democrat since Woodrow Wilson in 1912 to win the White House without carrying Plumas County. Nevertheless, Clinton retained seven counties that in 1992 he had been the first Democrat to carry since 1964: San Bernardino, Ventura, San Joaquin, Santa Barbara, Monterey, Imperial, and San Benito, of which all save Imperial and San Benito cast over 100,000 votes. He also retained all the counties that had voted Democratic in 1988, including a number of sizeable ones that had voted Republican in 1976, such as Santa Clara, Contra Costa, San Mateo, and Sonoma. This was the last election in which California voted to the right of Arkansas, Michigan, Minnesota, or West Virginia. This was also the first election since 1912 in which California voted differently than nearby Montana.

Late in the 1996 campaign, Dole had made an upset victory over Clinton in California central to his strategy. Dole hoped to capitalize on two issues that had been figuring prominently in California politics under Governor Pete Wilson, illegal immigration and affirmative action. California is one of 13 states where on the election ballot, James Campbell of California, Perot's former boss at IBM, was listed as a stand-in vice-presidential candidate. The Reform Party successfully conducted a drive to qualify as a party in California over the course of eighteen days in 1995.

Among white voters, 45% supported Clinton, while 43% supported Dole. 7% supported Perot.

== Primary elections ==
=== Democratic primary ===
1996 California Democratic presidential primary
Candidate	Votes	%
Bill Clinton	2,342,185	92.83%
Lyndon LaRouche	173,953	6.89%
Ralph Nader †	6,599	0.26%
Pat Paulsen †	310	0.10%
Ronald Spangler †	10	0.00%
Oscar Smith Jr. †	3	0.00%
Hal Womack †	2	0.00%
Stanley Hallen †	0	0.00%
Total	2,523,062	100%

† Indicates a write

=== Republican primary ===
Republican primary county results Dole: 50–60% 60–70% 70–80%

The California Republican presidential primary was held on March 26, 1996, as a part of the Republican Party's statewide nomination process for the upcoming presidential election. Senator Bob Dole of Kansas gained nearly two-thirds of the vote against political commentator Pat Buchanan and publishing executive Steve Forbes.

1996 California Republican presidential primary
Candidate	Votes	%
Bob Dole	1,619,931	66.06%
Pat Buchanan	450,695	18.38%
Steve Forbes	183,367	7.48%
Alan Keyes	93,577	3.82%
Lamar Alexander	44,130	1.80%
Robert K. Dornan	23,215	0.95%
Phil Gramm	15,232	0.62%
Richard Lugar	14,801	0.60%
Morry Taylor	5,778	0.24%
Ralph Nader (write-in)	1,441	0.06%
Pat Paulsen (write-in)	136	0.00%
Joel Neuberg (write-in)	9	0.00%
Total	2,452,312	100.00%

== General election ==
1996 United States presidential election in California
Party	Candidate	Running mate	Votes	Percentage	Electoral votes
Democratic	William Jefferson Clinton (Incumbent)	Albert Arnold Gore Jr. (Incumbent)	5,119,835	51.10%	54
Republican	Robert Joseph Dole	Jack French Kemp	3,828,380	38.21%	0
Reform	Henry Ross Perot	James Campbell	697,847	6.96%	0
Green	Ralph Nader	Winona LaDuke	237,016	2.37%	0
Libertarian	Harry Browne	Jo Jorgensen	73,600	0.73%	0
Peace and Freedom	Marsha Feinland	Kate McClatchy	25,332	0.25%	0
Taxpayers’	Howard Phillips	Herbert Titus	21,202	0.21%	0
Natural Law	John Hagelin	Dr. V. Tompkins	15,403	0.15%	0
Write-in	Charles Collins		765	0.01%	0
Write-in	James Harris		77	0.00%	0
Write-in	Joel Neuberg		13	0.00%	0
Write-in	Willie Carter		12	0.00%	0
Write-in	Isabell Masters		2	0.00%	0
Invalid or blank votes			242,155	2.36%	—
Totals		10,261,639	100.00%	54	
Voter turnout		65.53%		—	

=== By county ===
County	Bill Clinton Democratic		Bob Dole Republican		Ross Perot Reform		Ralph Nader Green		Various candidates Other parties		Margin		Total votes cast
County	#	%	#	%	#	%	#	%	#	%	#	%	Total votes cast
Alameda	303,903	65.77%	106,581	23.07%	24,270	5.25%	20,432	4.42%	6,858	1.48%	197,322	42.70%	462,044
Alpine	258	42.02%	264	43.00%	63	10.26%	19	3.09%	10	1.63%	-6	-0.98%	614
Amador	5,868	40.60%	6,870	47.54%	1,267	8.77%	264	1.83%	183	1.27%	-1,002	-6.94%	14,452
Butte	30,651	38.53%	38,961	48.98%	6,393	8.04%	2,409	3.03%	1,136	1.43%	-8,310	-10.45%	79,550
Calaveras	6,646	38.63%	8,279	48.12%	1,612	9.37%	338	1.96%	331	1.92%	-1,633	-9.49%	17,206
Colusa	2,054	36.60%	3,047	54.29%	404	7.20%	42	0.75%	65	1.16%	-993	-17.69%	5,612
Contra Costa	196,512	55.73%	123,954	35.15%	20,416	5.79%	7,334	2.08%	4,386	1.24%	72,558	20.58%	352,602
Del Norte	3,652	41.08%	3,670	41.29%	1,225	13.78%	199	2.24%	143	1.61%	-18	-0.21%	8,889
El Dorado	22,957	36.33%	32,759	51.84%	5,077	8.03%	1,439	2.28%	964	1.53%	-9,802	-15.51%	63,196
Fresno	94,448	45.32%	98,813	47.42%	10,962	5.26%	2,523	1.21%	1,647	0.79%	-4,365	-2.10%	208,393
Glenn	2,841	32.04%	5,041	56.86%	788	8.89%	85	0.96%	111	1.25%	-2,200	-24.82%	8,866
Humboldt	24,628	44.17%	19,803	35.52%	5,811	10.42%	4,651	8.34%	864	1.55%	4,825	8.65%	55,757
Imperial	14,591	55.27%	9,705	36.76%	1,778	6.73%	154	0.58%	172	0.65%	4,886	18.51%	26,400
Inyo	2,601	34.36%	3,924	51.84%	811	10.71%	127	1.68%	106	1.40%	-1,323	-17.48%	7,569
Kern	62,658	36.56%	92,151	53.77%	13,452	7.85%	1,289	0.75%	1,841	1.07%	-29,493	-17.21%	171,391
Kings	11,254	43.59%	12,368	47.91%	1,745	6.76%	205	0.79%	243	0.94%	-1,114	-4.32%	25,815
Lake	10,432	48.90%	7,458	34.96%	2,539	11.90%	583	2.73%	323	1.51%	2,974	13.94%	21,335
Lassen	3,318	33.60%	5,194	52.60%	1,080	10.94%	131	1.33%	152	1.54%	-1,876	-19.00%	9,875
Los Angeles	1,430,629	59.34%	746,544	30.96%	157,752	6.54%	45,977	1.91%	30,112	1.25%	684,085	28.38%	2,411,014
Madera	11,254	36.70%	16,510	53.85%	2,192	7.15%	376	1.23%	330	1.08%	-5,256	-17.15%	30,662
Marin	67,406	58.04%	32,714	28.17%	6,559	5.65%	7,360	6.34%	2,101	1.81%	34,692	29.87%	116,140
Mariposa	2,920	36.73%	3,976	50.02%	729	9.17%	192	2.42%	132	1.66%	-1,056	-13.29%	7,949
Mendocino	14,952	45.74%	9,765	29.87%	3,685	11.27%	3,608	11.04%	682	2.09%	5,187	15.87%	32,692
Merced	21,786	46.41%	20,847	44.41%	3,427	7.30%	462	0.98%	416	0.89%	939	2.00%	46,938
Modoc	1,368	31.79%	2,285	53.10%	528	12.27%	49	1.14%	73	1.70%	-917	-21.31%	4,303
Mono	1,580	38.62%	1,882	46.00%	447	10.93%	96	2.35%	86	2.10%	-302	-7.38%	4,091
Monterey	57,700	53.15%	39,794	36.66%	7,240	6.67%	2,391	2.20%	1,433	1.32%	17,906	16.49%	108,558
Napa	24,588	50.89%	17,439	36.09%	4,254	8.80%	1,242	2.57%	796	1.65%	7,149	14.80%	48,319
Nevada	15,369	35.56%	21,784	50.40%	3,330	7.70%	2,097	4.85%	639	1.48%	-6,415	-14.84%	43,219
Orange	327,485	37.88%	446,717	51.67%	66,195	7.66%	11,842	1.37%	12,337	1.43%	-119,232	-13.79%	864,576
Placer	34,981	37.05%	49,808	52.75%	6,542	6.93%	1,875	1.99%	1,221	1.29%	-14,827	-15.70%	94,427
Plumas	3,540	36.31%	4,905	50.31%	919	9.43%	214	2.19%	172	1.76%	-1,365	-14.00%	9,750
Riverside	168,579	43.05%	178,611	45.61%	35,481	9.06%	4,814	1.23%	4,128	1.05%	-10,032	-2.56%	391,613
Sacramento	203,019	49.83%	166,049	40.76%	23,856	5.86%	9,142	2.24%	5,348	1.31%	36,970	9.07%	407,414
San Benito	7,030	50.55%	5,384	38.72%	1,044	7.51%	236	1.70%	212	1.52%	1,646	11.83%	13,906
San Bernardino	183,372	44.36%	180,135	43.58%	39,330	9.51%	5,150	1.25%	5,368	1.30%	3,237	0.78%	413,355
San Diego	389,964	44.11%	402,876	45.57%	63,037	7.13%	15,858	1.79%	12,416	1.40%	-12,912	-1.46%	884,151
San Francisco	209,777	72.24%	45,479	15.66%	9,659	3.33%	21,471	7.39%	3,999	1.38%	164,298	56.58%	290,385
San Joaquin	67,253	46.34%	65,131	44.87%	9,692	6.68%	1,501	1.03%	1,563	1.08%	2,122	1.47%	145,140
San Luis Obispo	40,395	40.19%	46,733	46.50%	8,204	8.16%	3,854	3.83%	1,314	1.31%	-6,338	-6.31%	100,500
San Mateo	152,304	60.55%	73,508	29.22%	15,047	5.98%	7,336	2.92%	3,337	1.33%	78,796	31.33%	251,532
Santa Barbara	70,650	46.87%	63,915	42.40%	9,457	6.27%	4,774	3.17%	1,949	1.29%	6,735	4.47%	150,745
Santa Clara	297,639	56.88%	168,291	32.16%	34,908	6.67%	12,312	2.35%	10,141	1.94%	129,348	24.72%	523,291
Santa Cruz	58,250	56.52%	27,766	26.94%	6,555	6.36%	7,803	7.57%	2,688	2.61%	30,484	29.58%	103,062
Shasta	20,848	33.11%	34,736	55.17%	5,875	9.33%	675	1.07%	827	1.31%	-13,888	-22.06%	62,961
Sierra	573	33.57%	877	51.38%	170	9.96%	40	2.34%	47	2.75%	-304	-17.81%	1,707
Siskiyou	7,022	38.39%	8,653	47.30%	1,879	10.27%	372	2.03%	367	2.01%	-1,631	-8.91%	18,293
Solano	64,644	55.12%	40,742	34.74%	8,682	7.40%	1,868	1.59%	1,343	1.15%	23,902	20.38%	117,279
Sonoma	100,738	55.57%	53,555	29.54%	13,862	7.65%	9,547	5.27%	3,595	1.98%	47,183	26.03%	181,297
Stanislaus	53,738	45.93%	52,403	44.79%	8,360	7.14%	1,172	1.00%	1,334	1.14%	1,335	1.14%	117,007
Sutter	8,504	34.37%	14,264	57.64%	1,533	6.20%	208	0.84%	236	0.95%	-5,760	-23.27%	24,745
Tehama	7,290	35.66%	10,292	50.34%	2,325	11.37%	245	1.20%	291	1.42%	-3,002	-14.68%	20,443
Trinity	2,203	37.38%	2,530	42.93%	856	14.53%	159	2.70%	145	2.46%	-327	-5.55%	5,893
Tulare	32,669	38.06%	46,272	53.90%	5,106	5.95%	737	0.86%	1,062	1.24%	-13,603	-15.84%	85,846
Tuolumne	8,950	40.73%	10,386	47.27%	1,925	8.76%	427	1.94%	284	1.29%	-1,436	-6.54%	21,972
Ventura	110,772	44.10%	109,202	43.47%	23,054	9.18%	4,732	1.88%	3,434	1.37%	1,570	0.63%	251,194
Yolo	33,033	56.88%	18,807	32.38%	3,150	5.42%	2,377	4.09%	712	1.23%	14,226	24.50%	58,079
Yuba	5,789	37.42%	7,971	51.53%	1,308	8.46%	201	1.30%	201	1.30%	-2,182	-14.11%	15,470
Total	5,119,835	51.10%	3,828,380	38.21%	697,847	6.96%	237,016	2.37%	136,406	1.36%	1,291,455	12.89%	10,019,484

Counties that flipped from Democratic to Republican

- Butte
- Del Norte
- Fresno
- Mariposa
- Plumas
- Riverside
- San Diego
- San Luis Obispo
- Siskiyou
- Tehama
- Tuolumne

Counties that flipped from Independent to Republican

- Trinity

=== By congressional district ===
Clinton won 36 of 52 congressional districts, including eight held by Republicans, with the remaining 16 going to Dole, including one held by a Democrat.

District	Clinton	Dole	Perot	Representative
1st	48%	35%	10%	Frank Riggs
2nd	36%	51%	9%	Wally Herger
3rd	45%	44%	7%	Vic Fazio
4th	38%	51%	8%	John Doolittle
5th	57%	34%	5%	Bob Matsui
6th	57%	29%	7%	Lynn Woolsey
7th	65%	25%	6%	George Miller
8th	66%	18%	4%	Nancy Pelosi
9th	75%	13%	3%	Ron Dellums
10th	48%	43%	6%	Bill Baker
10th	48%	43%	6%	Ellen Tauscher
11th	46%	45%	7%	Richard Pombo
12th	70%	21%	4%	Tom Lantos
13th	62%	28%	7%	Pete Stark
14th	58%	31%	6%	Anna Eshoo
15th	53%	35%	7%	Tom Campbell
16th	61%	29%	6%	Zoe Lofgren
17th	55%	32%	6%	Sam Farr
18th	46%	45%	7%	Gary Condit
19th	40%	52%	6%	George Radanovich
20th	52%	41%	6%	Cal Dooley
21st	34%	56%	8%	Bill Thomas
22nd	44.0%	44.2%	7%	Andrea Seastrand
22nd	44.0%	44.2%	7%	Walter Capps
23rd	46%	42%	9%	Elton Gallegly
24th	52%	37%	7%	Anthony Beilenson
24th	52%	37%	7%	Brad Sherman
25th	41%	47%	9%	Buck McKeon
26th	65%	25%	7%	Howard Berman
27th	49%	41%	7%	Carlos Moorhead
27th	49%	41%	7%	Jim Rogan
28th	45%	44%	8%	David Dreier
29th	67%	24%	5%	Henry Waxman
30th	71%	20%	5%	Xavier Becerra
31st	65%	26%	7%	Matthew G. Martínez
32nd	81%	12%	4%	Julian Dixon
33rd	80%	14%	4%	Lucille Roybal-Allard
34th	64%	27%	7%	Esteban Torres
35th	84%	11%	4%	Maxine Waters
36th	47%	41%	8%	Jane Harman
37th	82%	13%	4%	Walter R. Tucker III
37th	82%	13%	4%	Juanita Millender-McDonald
38th	53%	36%	8%	Steve Horn
39th	41%	48%	8%	Ed Royce
40th	38%	49%	11%	Jerry Lewis
41st	43%	47%	8%	Jay Kim
42nd	54%	36%	9%	George Brown Jr.
43rd	43%	46%	9%	Ken Calvert
44th	44%	45%	9%	Sonny Bono
45th	38%	51%	8%	Dana Rohrabacher
46th	49%	41%	8%	Bob Dornan
46th	49%	41%	8%	Loretta Sánchez
47th	36%	54%	7%	Christopher Cox
48th	34%	56%	8%	Ron Packard
49th	49%	40%	7%	Brian Bilbray
50th	60%	32%	6%	Bob Filner
51st	39%	52%	7%	Duke Cunningham
52nd	41%	48%	8%	Duncan Hunter

=== By city ===
Official outcome by city and unincorporated areas of counties, of which Clinton won 307 and Dole won 219.
City	County	Bill Clinton Democratic		Bob Dole Republican		Ross Perot Reform		Various candidates Other parties		Margin		Total Votes	1988 (Note: Quality of 1992 Supplement to Statement of Vote is too poor to account accurate numbers) to 1996 Swing%
City	County	#	%	#	%	#	%	#	%	#	%	Total Votes	1988 to 1996 Swing%
Alameda	Alameda	16,124	61.79%	7,176	27.50%	1,459	5.59%	1,336	5.12%	8,948	34.29%	26,095	19.75%
Albany	Alameda	5,240	71.35%	975	13.28%	231	3.15%	898	12.23%	4,265	58.07%	7,344	1.25%
Berkeley	Alameda	37,859	73.65%	4,332	8.43%	1,067	2.08%	8,148	15.85%	33,527	65.22%	51,406	-7.34%
Dublin	Alameda	4,347	51.27%	3,238	38.19%	635	7.49%	259	3.05%	1,109	13.08%	8,479	25.51%
Emeryville	Alameda	1,725	71.70%	351	14.59%	93	3.87%	237	9.85%	1,374	57.11%	2,406	10.03%
Fremont	Alameda	34,477	57.16%	19,386	32.14%	4,529	7.51%	1,922	3.19%	15,091	25.02%	60,314	26.82%
Hayward	Alameda	20,218	67.74%	6,680	22.38%	2,000	6.70%	947	3.17%	13,538	45.36%	29,845	20.51%
Livermore	Alameda	11,871	45.17%	11,409	43.41%	2,241	8.53%	762	2.90%	462	1.76%	26,283	21.08%
Newark	Alameda	7,030	59.45%	3,373	28.52%	1,019	8.62%	404	3.42%	3,657	30.92%	11,826	22.77%
Oakland	Alameda	96,042	80.35%	11,584	9.69%	3,265	2.73%	8,635	7.22%	84,458	70.66%	119,526	5.42%
Piedmont	Alameda	3,247	54.70%	2,158	36.35%	232	3.91%	299	5.04%	1,089	18.35%	5,936	24.23%
Pleasanton	Alameda	11,925	45.96%	11,729	45.21%	1,654	6.38%	637	2.46%	196	0.76%	25,945	24.68%
San Leandro	Alameda	14,773	65.01%	5,621	24.74%	1,546	6.80%	783	3.45%	9,152	40.28%	22,723	20.26%
Union City	Alameda	10,288	68.47%	3,507	23.34%	907	6.04%	323	2.15%	6,781	45.13%	15,025	24.26%
Unincorporated Area	Alameda	25,275	58.38%	13,391	30.93%	3,154	7.28%	1,475	3.41%	11,884	27.45%	43,295	16.43%
Unapportioned Absentees	Alameda	3,462	62.05%	1,671	29.95%	238	4.27%	208	3.73%	1,791	32.10%	5,579	31.68%
Unincorporated Area	Alpine	258	42.02%	264	43.00%	63	10.26%	29	4.72%	-6	-0.98%	614	12.79%
Amador City	Amador	32	37.21%	38	44.19%	12	13.95%	4	4.65%	-6	-6.98%	86	24.73%
Ione	Amador	335	37.90%	434	49.10%	89	10.07%	26	2.94%	-99	-11.20%	884	0.95%
Jackson	Amador	861	47.00%	774	42.25%	136	7.42%	61	3.33%	87	4.75%	1,832	14.78%
Plymouth	Amador	141	41.11%	152	44.31%	40	11.66%	10	2.92%	-11	-3.21%	343	8.32%
Sutter Creek	Amador	513	44.96%	480	42.07%	108	9.47%	40	3.51%	33	2.89%	1,141	5.54%
Unincorporated Area	Amador	3,986	39.21%	4,992	49.10%	882	8.68%	306	3.01%	-1,006	-9.90%	10,166	4.05%
Biggs	Butte	183	36.53%	278	55.49%	37	7.39%	3	0.60%	-95	-18.96%	501	-0.90%
Chico	Butte	9,167	45.54%	8,212	40.79%	1,424	7.07%	1,327	6.59%	955	4.74%	20,130	-4.27%
Gridley	Butte	544	42.27%	626	48.64%	96	7.46%	21	1.63%	-82	-6.37%	1,287	5.79%
Oroville	Butte	1,337	41.68%	1,516	47.26%	284	8.85%	71	2.21%	-179	-5.58%	3,208	7.68%
Paradise	Butte	4,505	35.63%	6,524	51.59%	1,199	9.48%	417	3.30%	-2,019	-15.97%	12,645	6.88%
Unincorporated Area	Butte	14,915	35.70%	21,805	52.19%	3,353	8.03%	1,705	4.08%	-6,890	-16.49%	41,778	2.93%
Angels	Calaveras	337	40.90%	365	44.30%	91	11.04%	31	3.76%	-28	-3.40%	824	0.86%
Unincorporated Area	Calaveras	3,999	38.08%	5,009	47.70%	1,074	10.23%	420	4.00%	-1,010	-9.62%	10,502	2.69%
Unapportioned Absentees	Calaveras	2,310	39.29%	2,905	49.40%	447	7.60%	218	3.71%	-595	-10.12%	5,880	14.95%
Colusa	Colusa	565	39.82%	706	49.75%	120	8.46%	28	1.97%	-141	-9.94%	1,419	7.36%
Williams	Colusa	196	45.79%	186	43.46%	39	9.11%	7	1.64%	10	2.34%	428	19.58%
Unincorporated Area	Colusa	1,293	34.34%	2,155	57.24%	245	6.51%	72	1.91%	-862	-22.90%	3,765	0.04%
Antioch	Contra Costa	14,948	56.49%	8,929	33.74%	1,996	7.54%	589	2.23%	6,019	22.75%	26,462	14.46%
Brentwood	Contra Costa	2,379	49.42%	1,992	41.38%	345	7.17%	98	2.04%	387	8.04%	4,814	9.73%
Clayton	Contra Costa	2,232	44.24%	2,430	48.17%	272	5.39%	111	2.20%	-198	-3.92%	5,045	26.79%
Concord	Contra Costa	23,390	55.52%	14,493	34.40%	2,854	6.77%	1,391	3.30%	8,897	21.12%	42,128	18.73%
Danville	Contra Costa	8,210	40.53%	10,551	52.09%	1,032	5.09%	463	2.29%	-2,341	-11.56%	20,256	24.75%
El Cerrito	Contra Costa	8,000	69.61%	2,136	18.59%	409	3.56%	948	8.25%	5,864	51.02%	11,493	12.72%
Hercules	Contra Costa	4,332	69.31%	1,494	23.90%	259	4.14%	165	2.64%	2,838	45.41%	6,250	29.45%
Lafayette	Contra Costa	6,442	48.50%	5,656	42.58%	633	4.77%	552	4.16%	786	5.92%	13,283	23.73%
Martinez	Contra Costa	3,831	44.78%	4,126	48.23%	345	4.03%	253	2.96%	-295	-3.45%	8,555	-11.41%
Moraga	Contra Costa	8,828	57.03%	5,044	32.58%	1,060	6.85%	548	3.54%	3,784	24.44%	15,480	53.91%
Orinda	Contra Costa	4,778	46.42%	4,642	45.10%	441	4.28%	431	4.19%	136	1.32%	10,292	22.15%
Pinole	Contra Costa	10,009	68.60%	3,339	22.88%	922	6.32%	321	2.20%	6,670	45.71%	14,591	32.85%
Pittsburg	Contra Costa	7,997	55.22%	4,886	33.74%	1,010	6.97%	590	4.07%	3,111	21.48%	14,483	-8.68%
Pleasant Hill	Contra Costa	4,381	61.38%	2,052	28.75%	474	6.64%	230	3.22%	2,329	32.63%	7,137	29.51%
Richmond	Contra Costa	22,551	80.93%	3,331	11.95%	979	3.51%	1,005	3.61%	19,220	68.97%	27,866	10.28%
San Pablo	Contra Costa	3,780	77.81%	692	14.24%	258	5.31%	128	2.63%	3,088	63.57%	4,858	15.23%
San Ramon	Contra Costa	8,141	45.27%	8,349	46.43%	1,090	6.06%	403	2.24%	-208	-1.16%	17,983	28.99%
Walnut Creek	Contra Costa	17,398	50.33%	14,464	41.84%	1,649	4.77%	1,055	3.05%	2,934	8.49%	34,566	27.97%
Unincorporated Area	Contra Costa	34,885	52.03%	25,348	37.80%	4,388	6.54%	2,430	3.62%	9,537	14.22%	67,051	11.99%
Crescent City	Del Norte	356	46.23%	262	34.03%	110	14.29%	42	5.45%	94	12.21%	770	6.32%
Unincorporated Area	Del Norte	3,296	40.60%	3,408	41.98%	1,115	13.73%	300	3.70%	-112	-1.38%	8,119	1.27%
Placerville	El Dorado	1,545	43.08%	1,617	45.09%	274	7.64%	150	4.18%	-72	-2.01%	3,586	13.56%
South Lake Tahoe	El Dorado	2,739	48.82%	1,998	35.61%	573	10.21%	300	5.35%	741	13.21%	5,610	18.64%
Unincorporated Area	El Dorado	18,673	34.58%	29,144	53.97%	4,230	7.83%	1,951	3.61%	-10,471	-19.39%	53,998	3.51%
Clovis	Fresno	7,118	36.01%	10,955	55.42%	1,318	6.67%	375	1.90%	-3,837	-19.41%	19,766	-4.75%
Coalinga	Fresno	1,034	39.65%	1,270	48.70%	254	9.74%	50	1.92%	-236	-9.05%	2,608	6.54%
Firebaugh	Fresno	514	65.81%	233	29.83%	26	3.33%	8	1.02%	281	35.98%	781	14.23%
Fowler	Fresno	552	53.28%	417	40.25%	50	4.83%	17	1.64%	135	13.03%	1,036	-2.14%
Fresno	Fresno	51,389	49.42%	45,203	43.47%	5,199	5.00%	2,195	2.11%	6,186	5.95%	103,986	-3.17%
Huron	Fresno	330	85.27%	33	8.53%	20	5.17%	4	1.03%	297	76.74%	387	8.63%
Kerman	Fresno	594	50.99%	500	42.92%	63	5.41%	8	0.69%	94	8.07%	1,165	0.00%
Kingsburg	Fresno	997	32.50%	1,845	60.14%	169	5.51%	57	1.86%	-848	-27.64%	3,068	-6.82%
Mendota	Fresno	951	83.13%	129	11.28%	55	4.81%	9	0.79%	822	71.85%	1,144	17.23%
Orange Cove	Fresno	779	78.77%	164	16.58%	39	3.94%	7	0.71%	615	62.18%	989	43.91%
Parlier	Fresno	1,324	89.70%	105	7.11%	37	2.51%	10	0.68%	1,219	82.59%	1,476	13.51%
Reedley	Fresno	1,924	40.57%	2,531	53.36%	215	4.53%	73	1.54%	-607	-12.80%	4,743	4.36%
San Joaquin	Fresno	195	76.47%	48	18.82%	9	3.53%	3	1.18%	147	57.65%	255	42.06%
Sanger	Fresno	2,815	66.50%	1,175	27.76%	204	4.82%	39	0.92%	1,640	38.74%	4,233	11.87%
Selma	Fresno	2,021	56.80%	1,343	37.75%	162	4.55%	32	0.90%	678	19.06%	3,558	6.48%
Unincorporated Area	Fresno	21,911	37.07%	32,862	55.60%	3,142	5.32%	1,185	2.01%	-10,951	-18.53%	59,100	-3.27%
Orland	Glenn	704	34.49%	1,114	54.58%	168	8.23%	55	2.69%	-410	-20.09%	2,041	10.38%
Willows	Glenn	752	36.56%	1,065	51.77%	200	9.72%	40	1.94%	-313	-15.22%	2,057	2.56%
Unincorporated Area	Glenn	1,385	29.06%	2,862	60.05%	420	8.81%	99	2.08%	-1,477	-30.99%	4,766	-3.66%
Arcata	Humboldt	4,047	55.61%	1,101	15.13%	510	7.01%	1,620	22.26%	2,946	40.48%	7,278	-7.92%
Blue Lake	Humboldt	252	48.09%	131	25.00%	65	12.40%	76	14.50%	121	23.09%	524	-24.06%
Eureka	Humboldt	3,848	47.14%	2,907	35.61%	902	11.05%	506	6.20%	941	11.53%	8,163	-1.96%
Ferndale	Humboldt	212	36.12%	288	49.06%	65	11.07%	22	3.75%	-76	-12.95%	587	1.86%
Fortuna	Humboldt	1,200	37.43%	1,471	45.88%	430	13.41%	105	3.28%	-271	-8.45%	3,206	9.04%
Rio Dell	Humboldt	306	35.09%	387	44.38%	157	18.00%	22	2.52%	-81	-9.29%	872	3.92%
Trinidad	Humboldt	101	47.42%	71	33.33%	13	6.10%	28	13.15%	30	14.08%	213	-24.34%
Unincorporated Area	Humboldt	10,265	43.15%	8,341	35.06%	2,728	11.47%	2,455	10.32%	1,924	8.09%	23,789	-8.72%
Unapportioned Absentees	Humboldt	4,397	39.53%	5,106	45.90%	941	8.46%	679	6.10%	-709	-6.37%	11,123	-7.74%
Brawley	Imperial	2,308	56.46%	1,459	35.69%	282	6.90%	39	0.95%	849	20.77%	4,088	22.66%
Calexico	Imperial	2,780	85.04%	380	11.62%	90	2.75%	19	0.58%	2,400	73.42%	3,269	29.81%
Calipatria	Imperial	290	60.29%	132	27.44%	55	11.43%	4	0.83%	158	32.85%	481	33.83%
El Centro	Imperial	3,762	55.79%	2,446	36.27%	433	6.42%	102	1.51%	1,316	19.52%	6,743	33.67%
Holtville	Imperial	502	49.07%	446	43.60%	63	6.16%	12	1.17%	56	5.47%	1,023	28.99%
Imperial	Imperial	709	46.52%	664	43.57%	139	9.12%	12	0.79%	45	2.95%	1,524	29.73%
Westmorland	Imperial	193	61.66%	94	30.03%	24	7.67%	2	0.64%	99	31.63%	313	22.88%
Unincorporated Area	Imperial	2,391	44.05%	2,420	44.58%	528	9.73%	89	1.64%	-29	-0.53%	5,428	21.29%
Unapportioned Absentees	Imperial	1,656	46.90%	1,664	47.13%	164	4.64%	47	1.33%	-8	-0.23%	3,531	37.85%
Bishop	Inyo	399	10.34%	3,270	84.76%	138	3.58%	51	1.32%	-2,871	-74.42%	3,858	-45.59%
Unincorporated Area	Inyo	2,202	59.34%	654	17.62%	673	18.14%	182	4.90%	1,548	41.71%	3,711	72.52%
Arvin	Kern	845	68.42%	297	24.05%	84	6.80%	9	0.73%	548	44.37%	1,235	29.82%
Bakersfield	Kern	24,078	36.56%	36,791	55.87%	3,986	6.05%	1,000	1.52%	-12,713	-19.30%	65,855	7.13%
California City	Kern	1,006	34.75%	1,495	51.64%	334	11.54%	60	2.07%	-489	-16.89%	2,895	19.00%
Delano	Kern	3,194	67.44%	1,289	27.22%	217	4.58%	36	0.76%	1,905	40.22%	4,736	29.11%
Maricopa	Kern	113	33.93%	165	49.55%	52	15.62%	3	0.90%	-52	-15.62%	333	10.35%
McFarland	Kern	719	68.28%	248	23.55%	71	6.74%	15	1.42%	471	44.73%	1,053	27.33%
Ridgecrest	Kern	2,943	28.32%	6,244	60.08%	940	9.04%	266	2.56%	-3,301	-31.76%	10,393	6.85%
Shafter	Kern	943	39.92%	1,233	52.20%	158	6.69%	28	1.19%	-290	-12.28%	2,362	15.89%
Taft	Kern	618	28.65%	1,296	60.08%	208	9.64%	35	1.62%	-678	-31.43%	2,157	5.50%
Tehachapi	Kern	835	38.18%	1,077	49.25%	226	10.33%	49	2.24%	-242	-11.07%	2,187	12.19%
Wasco	Kern	1,298	53.46%	976	40.20%	132	5.44%	22	0.91%	322	13.26%	2,428	25.25%
Unincorporated Area	Kern	26,066	34.52%	41,040	54.34%	7,044	9.33%	1,369	1.81%	-14,974	-19.83%	75,519	3.22%
Avenal	Kings	591	60.43%	301	30.78%	73	7.46%	13	1.33%	290	29.65%	978	26.52%
Corcoran	Kings	1,110	56.26%	693	35.12%	143	7.25%	27	1.37%	417	21.14%	1,973	25.72%
Hanford	Kings	4,844	43.87%	5,290	47.91%	704	6.38%	204	1.85%	-446	-4.04%	11,042	5.26%
Lemoore	Kings	1,647	38.62%	2,248	52.71%	301	7.06%	69	1.62%	-601	-14.09%	4,265	13.29%
Unincorporated Area	Kings	3,062	40.68%	3,836	50.96%	524	6.96%	105	1.39%	-774	-10.28%	7,527	6.08%
Clearlake	Lake	2,377	64.33%	711	19.24%	477	12.91%	130	3.52%	1,666	45.09%	3,695	20.07%
Lakeport	Lake	856	40.26%	977	45.95%	239	11.24%	54	2.54%	-121	-5.69%	2,126	6.94%
Unincorporated Area	Lake	7,199	46.41%	5,770	37.20%	1,823	11.75%	720	4.64%	1,429	9.21%	15,512	9.89%
Susanville	Lassen (Note: The sum of Perot’s votes across Lassen County municipalities is 100 fewer than the official county-wide tally.)	968	37.05%	1,278	48.91%	288	11.02%	79	3.02%	-310	-11.86%	2,613	-2.13%
Unincorporated Area	Lassen	1,767	32.08%	3,038	55.16%	546	9.91%	157	2.85%	-1,271	-23.08%	5,508	-0.08%
Unapportioned Absentees	Lassen	583	35.27%	878	53.12%	146	8.83%	46	2.78%	-295	-17.85%	1,653	4.27%
Agoura Hills	Los Angeles (Note: The sum of Clinton’s votes across Los Angeles County municipalities is 9996 fewer than the official county-wide tally.) (Note: The sum of Perot’s votes across Los Angeles County municipalities exceeds the official county-wide tally by 22.)	4,290	47.91%	3,674	41.03%	697	7.78%	294	3.28%	616	6.88%	8,955	31.81%
Alhambra	Los Angeles	11,831	60.54%	5,884	30.11%	1,256	6.43%	572	2.93%	5,947	30.43%	19,543	30.67%
Arcadia	Los Angeles	6,696	35.65%	10,404	55.39%	1,208	6.43%	475	2.53%	-3,708	-19.74%	18,783	25.00%
Artesia	Los Angeles	2,013	58.04%	1,126	32.47%	272	7.84%	57	1.64%	887	25.58%	3,468	38.66%
Avalon	Los Angeles	430	36.82%	516	44.18%	169	14.47%	53	4.54%	-86	-7.36%	1,168	13.44%
Azusa	Los Angeles	3,883	53.46%	2,541	34.99%	693	9.54%	146	2.01%	1,342	18.48%	7,263	29.38%
Baldwin Park	Los Angeles	6,599	72.18%	1,655	18.10%	752	8.23%	136	1.49%	4,944	54.08%	9,142	44.20%
Bell	Los Angeles	2,672	76.52%	607	17.38%	161	4.61%	52	1.49%	2,065	59.14%	3,492	53.57%
Bell Gardens	Los Angeles	2,650	81.94%	382	11.81%	165	5.10%	37	1.14%	2,268	70.13%	3,234	51.88%
Bellflower	Los Angeles	5,933	48.60%	4,658	38.16%	1,337	10.95%	280	2.29%	1,275	10.44%	12,208	29.56%
Beverly Hills	Los Angeles	7,188	68.23%	2,598	24.66%	415	3.94%	334	3.17%	4,590	43.57%	10,535	22.77%
Bradbury	Los Angeles	86	28.86%	178	59.73%	28	9.40%	6	2.01%	-92	-30.87%	298	24.18%
Burbank	Los Angeles	14,584	49.90%	10,836	37.08%	2,740	9.38%	1,065	3.64%	3,748	12.82%	29,225	30.30%
Calabasas	Los Angeles	3,829	55.82%	2,358	34.38%	435	6.34%	237	3.46%	1,471	21.45%	6,859	N/A
Carson	Los Angeles	17,131	74.66%	4,147	18.07%	1,345	5.86%	321	1.40%	12,984	56.59%	22,944	26.24%
Cerritos	Los Angeles	7,861	52.28%	5,906	39.28%	1,003	6.67%	267	1.78%	1,955	13.00%	15,037	34.64%
Claremont	Los Angeles	6,423	51.54%	4,695	37.67%	669	5.37%	676	5.42%	1,728	13.87%	12,463	16.67%
Commerce	Los Angeles	2,387	81.30%	306	10.42%	182	6.20%	61	2.08%	2,081	70.88%	2,936	18.24%
Compton	Los Angeles	14,816	94.30%	382	2.43%	367	2.34%	146	0.93%	14,434	91.87%	15,711	4.21%
Covina	Los Angeles	5,492	44.01%	5,444	43.63%	1,259	10.09%	284	2.28%	48	0.38%	12,479	30.57%
Cudahy	Los Angeles	1,373	79.69%	245	14.22%	90	5.22%	15	0.87%	1,128	65.47%	1,723	43.79%
Culver City	Los Angeles	9,377	66.26%	3,234	22.85%	857	6.06%	684	4.83%	6,143	43.41%	14,152	19.37%
Diamond Bar	Los Angeles	6,541	45.41%	6,393	44.38%	1,108	7.69%	363	2.52%	148	1.03%	14,405	N/A
Downey	Los Angeles	13,863	48.90%	11,498	40.56%	2,360	8.32%	628	2.22%	2,365	8.34%	28,349	33.40%
Duarte	Los Angeles	2,778	53.64%	1,817	35.08%	442	8.53%	142	2.74%	961	18.56%	5,179	34.13%
El Monte	Los Angeles	8,021	68.63%	2,660	22.76%	777	6.65%	229	1.96%	5,361	45.87%	11,687	40.44%
El Segundo	Los Angeles	2,380	39.91%	2,790	46.78%	576	9.66%	218	3.66%	-410	-6.87%	5,964	26.14%
Gardena	Los Angeles	8,579	68.89%	2,834	22.76%	776	6.23%	265	2.13%	5,745	46.13%	12,454	26.75%
Glendale	Los Angeles	17,699	45.01%	17,554	44.64%	2,697	6.86%	1,370	3.48%	145	0.37%	39,320	27.02%
Glendora	Los Angeles	5,796	35.05%	8,841	53.46%	1,511	9.14%	390	2.36%	-3,045	-18.41%	16,538	24.26%
Hawaiian Gardens	Los Angeles	1,319	72.31%	325	17.82%	142	7.79%	38	2.08%	994	54.50%	1,824	38.02%
Hawthorne	Los Angeles	10,349	68.74%	3,478	23.10%	963	6.40%	266	1.77%	6,871	45.64%	15,056	43.18%
Hermosa Beach	Los Angeles	4,022	47.90%	3,142	37.42%	737	8.78%	496	5.91%	880	10.48%	8,397	21.82%
Hidden Hills	Los Angeles	355	46.28%	332	43.29%	58	7.56%	22	2.87%	23	3.00%	767	32.69%
Huntington Park	Los Angeles	4,347	80.43%	724	13.40%	255	4.72%	79	1.46%	3,623	67.03%	5,405	51.70%
Industry	Los Angeles	12	25.53%	17	36.17%	11	23.40%	7	14.89%	-5	-10.64%	47	9.36%
Inglewood	Los Angeles	22,658	88.16%	1,825	7.10%	817	3.18%	400	1.56%	20,833	81.06%	25,700	17.12%
Irwindale	Los Angeles	248	72.30%	64	18.66%	26	7.58%	5	1.46%	184	53.64%	343	28.30%
La Cañada Flintridge	Los Angeles	2,486	32.33%	4,497	58.48%	490	6.37%	217	2.82%	-2,011	-26.15%	7,690	21.95%
La Habra Heights	Los Angeles	458	23.93%	1,261	65.88%	147	7.68%	48	2.51%	-803	-41.95%	1,914	14.68%
La Mirada	Los Angeles	5,979	41.09%	6,886	47.33%	1,357	9.33%	328	2.25%	-907	-6.23%	14,550	24.38%
La Puente	Los Angeles	4,562	73.30%	1,098	17.64%	468	7.52%	96	1.54%	3,464	55.66%	6,224	33.17%
La Verne	Los Angeles	4,457	41.43%	5,067	47.10%	980	9.11%	253	2.35%	-610	-5.67%	10,757	24.82%
Lakewood	Los Angeles	11,649	46.84%	9,870	39.68%	2,706	10.88%	647	2.60%	1,779	7.15%	24,872	24.64%
Lancaster	Los Angeles	9,196	35.82%	13,592	52.94%	2,322	9.04%	566	2.20%	-4,396	-17.12%	25,676	31.27%
Lawndale	Los Angeles	2,957	61.10%	1,291	26.67%	450	9.30%	142	2.93%	1,666	34.42%	4,840	47.98%
Lomita	Los Angeles	2,573	44.41%	2,329	40.20%	673	11.62%	219	3.78%	244	4.21%	5,794	25.87%
Long Beach	Los Angeles	57,923	53.31%	38,261	35.21%	8,415	7.74%	4,063	3.74%	19,662	18.09%	108,662	19.20%
Los Angeles	Los Angeles	576,146	67.23%	201,739	23.54%	47,782	5.58%	31,354	3.66%	374,407	43.69%	857,021	19.81%
Lynwood	Los Angeles	6,743	88.86%	508	6.69%	256	3.37%	81	1.07%	6,235	82.17%	7,588	29.51%
Malibu	Los Angeles	2,496	51.21%	1,709	35.06%	383	7.86%	286	5.87%	787	16.15%	4,874	N/A
Manhattan Beach	Los Angeles	6,789	44.06%	6,829	44.32%	1,139	7.39%	653	4.24%	-40	-0.26%	15,410	19.84%
Maywood	Los Angeles	2,019	82.81%	278	11.40%	108	4.43%	33	1.35%	1,741	71.41%	2,438	49.86%
Monrovia	Los Angeles	4,737	48.61%	3,859	39.60%	817	8.38%	332	3.41%	878	9.01%	9,745	25.93%
Montebello	Los Angeles	9,254	70.08%	2,891	21.89%	811	6.14%	248	1.88%	6,363	48.19%	13,204	25.48%
Monterey Park	Los Angeles	7,174	62.70%	3,355	29.32%	623	5.45%	289	2.53%	3,819	33.38%	11,441	25.16%
Norwalk	Los Angeles	11,726	61.91%	5,136	27.12%	1,721	9.09%	357	1.88%	6,590	34.79%	18,940	33.83%
Palmdale	Los Angeles	9,231	42.52%	9,788	45.09%	2,185	10.07%	504	2.32%	-557	-2.57%	21,708	39.95%
Palos Verdes Estates	Los Angeles	1,825	31.08%	3,551	60.48%	346	5.89%	149	2.54%	-1,726	-29.40%	5,871	18.86%
Paramount	Los Angeles	4,756	74.62%	1,063	16.68%	460	7.22%	95	1.49%	3,693	57.94%	6,374	48.40%
Pasadena	Los Angeles	21,529	58.20%	11,910	32.20%	1,977	5.34%	1,575	4.26%	9,619	26.00%	36,991	17.50%
Pico Rivera	Los Angeles	10,954	75.08%	2,403	16.47%	986	6.76%	247	1.69%	8,551	58.61%	14,590	24.58%
Pomona	Los Angeles	13,709	63.20%	5,713	26.34%	1,733	7.99%	538	2.48%	7,996	36.86%	21,693	30.85%
Rancho Palos Verdes	Los Angeles	7,398	36.41%	11,033	54.30%	1,308	6.44%	578	2.84%	-3,635	-17.89%	20,317	19.79%
Redondo Beach	Los Angeles	10,947	48.15%	8,659	38.08%	2,171	9.55%	960	4.22%	2,288	10.06%	22,737	29.81%
Rolling Hills	Los Angeles	181	21.50%	601	71.38%	40	4.75%	20	2.38%	-420	-49.88%	842	15.84%
Rolling Hills Estates	Los Angeles	1,002	30.93%	1,928	59.51%	211	6.51%	99	3.06%	-926	-28.58%	3,240	22.45%
Rosemead	Los Angeles	5,156	66.21%	1,884	24.19%	592	7.60%	155	1.99%	3,272	42.02%	7,787	34.14%
San Dimas	Los Angeles	4,304	40.04%	5,141	47.83%	1,035	9.63%	269	2.50%	-837	-7.79%	10,749	25.83%
San Fernando	Los Angeles	2,671	73.72%	643	17.75%	253	6.98%	56	1.55%	2,028	55.98%	3,623	37.24%
San Gabriel	Los Angeles	4,209	55.76%	2,633	34.88%	506	6.70%	200	2.65%	1,576	20.88%	7,548	30.77%
San Marino	Los Angeles	1,558	25.83%	4,086	67.74%	256	4.24%	132	2.19%	-2,528	-41.91%	6,032	16.52%
Santa Clarita	Los Angeles	15,136	38.08%	19,240	48.40%	4,265	10.73%	1,108	2.79%	-4,104	-10.32%	39,749	28.61%
Santa Fe Springs	Los Angeles	2,847	68.04%	981	23.45%	309	7.39%	47	1.12%	1,866	44.60%	4,184	28.04%
Santa Monica	Los Angeles	24,419	64.46%	8,804	23.24%	2,103	5.55%	2,558	6.75%	15,615	41.22%	37,884	14.19%
Sierra Madre	Los Angeles	2,383	41.91%	2,652	46.64%	372	6.54%	279	4.91%	-269	-4.73%	5,686	14.23%
Signal Hill	Los Angeles	1,339	57.82%	673	29.06%	199	8.59%	105	4.53%	666	28.76%	2,316	31.69%
South El Monte	Los Angeles	2,087	78.02%	365	13.64%	181	6.77%	42	1.57%	1,722	64.37%	2,675	32.90%
South Gate	Los Angeles	8,921	76.44%	1,887	16.17%	683	5.85%	180	1.54%	7,034	60.27%	11,671	56.93%
South Pasadena	Los Angeles	4,349	51.82%	3,069	36.57%	531	6.33%	444	5.29%	1,280	15.25%	8,393	19.65%
Temple City	Los Angeles	4,206	45.35%	3,941	42.49%	847	9.13%	281	3.03%	265	2.86%	9,275	29.17%
Torrance	Los Angeles	18,353	47.49%	14,993	38.80%	3,871	10.02%	1,429	3.70%	3,360	8.69%	38,646	39.38%
Walnut	Los Angeles	3,528	49.96%	2,873	40.68%	517	7.32%	144	2.04%	655	9.27%	7,062	34.82%
West Covina	Los Angeles	12,540	53.79%	8,512	36.51%	1,784	7.65%	475	2.04%	4,028	17.28%	23,311	32.88%
West Hollywood	Los Angeles	9,776	79.76%	1,279	10.43%	568	4.63%	634	5.17%	8,497	69.32%	12,257	16.66%
Westlake Village	Los Angeles	1,296	40.50%	1,601	50.03%	223	6.97%	80	2.50%	-305	-9.53%	3,200	27.41%
Whittier	Los Angeles	10,370	45.37%	9,962	43.58%	1,818	7.95%	708	3.10%	408	1.78%	22,858	26.23%
Unincorporated Area	Los Angeles	127,235	61.25%	60,229	29.00%	14,926	7.19%	5,328	2.57%	67,006	32.26%	207,718	27.92%
Unapportioned Absentees	Los Angeles	96,583	48.46%	87,921	44.11%	9,514	4.77%	5,304	2.66%	8,662	4.35%	199,322	14.40%
Chowchilla	Madera	686	36.78%	980	52.55%	170	9.12%	29	1.55%	-294	-15.76%	1,865	-9.21%
Madera	Madera	3,602	48.77%	3,210	43.46%	451	6.11%	123	1.67%	392	5.31%	7,386	-4.50%
Unincorporated Area	Madera	6,966	32.56%	12,320	57.58%	1,571	7.34%	538	2.51%	-5,354	-25.02%	21,395	-8.76%
Belvedere	Marin	553	41.55%	671	50.41%	54	4.06%	53	3.98%	-118	-8.87%	1,331	15.89%
Corte Madera	Marin	2,777	61.14%	1,087	23.93%	284	6.25%	394	8.67%	1,690	37.21%	4,542	13.02%
Fairfax	Marin	2,636	66.63%	508	12.84%	193	4.88%	619	15.65%	2,128	53.79%	3,956	-2.02%
Larkspur	Marin	3,799	57.64%	1,997	30.30%	333	5.05%	462	7.01%	1,802	27.34%	6,591	13.52%
Mill Valley	Marin	5,112	66.87%	1,523	19.92%	313	4.09%	697	9.12%	3,589	46.95%	7,645	7.19%
Novato	Marin	10,794	52.89%	7,134	34.96%	1,511	7.40%	969	4.75%	3,660	17.93%	20,408	18.94%
Ross	Marin	649	47.44%	585	42.76%	60	4.39%	74	5.41%	64	4.68%	1,368	12.80%
San Anselmo	Marin	4,348	65.47%	1,223	18.42%	289	4.35%	781	11.76%	3,125	47.06%	6,641	3.48%
San Rafael	Marin	13,116	58.13%	6,607	29.28%	1,247	5.53%	1,592	7.06%	6,509	28.85%	22,562	13.11%
Sausalito	Marin	2,579	61.65%	1,034	24.72%	217	5.19%	353	8.44%	1,545	36.94%	4,183	9.00%
Tiburon	Marin	2,387	53.92%	1,599	36.12%	226	5.11%	215	4.86%	788	17.80%	4,427	14.83%
Unincorporated Area	Marin	18,656	57.43%	8,746	26.92%	1,832	5.64%	3,251	10.01%	9,910	30.51%	32,485	7.12%
Unincorporated Area	Mariposa	2,920	36.75%	3,976	50.04%	729	9.18%	320	4.03%	-1,056	-13.29%	7,945	-2.14%
Fort Bragg	Mendocino	1,269	52.94%	557	23.24%	357	14.89%	214	8.93%	712	29.70%	2,397	3.54%
Point Arena	Mendocino	63	40.91%	46	29.87%	18	11.69%	27	17.53%	17	11.04%	154	-4.40%
Ukiah	Mendocino	2,605	49.42%	1,748	33.16%	503	9.54%	415	7.87%	857	16.26%	5,271	10.95%
Willits	Mendocino	763	48.57%	468	29.79%	222	14.13%	118	7.51%	295	18.78%	1,571	14.97%
Unincorporated Area	Mendocino	10,252	44.00%	6,946	29.81%	2,585	11.09%	3,516	15.09%	3,306	14.19%	23,299	-2.62%
Atwater	Merced	2,362	42.01%	2,693	47.90%	451	8.02%	116	2.06%	-331	-5.89%	5,622	9.31%
Dos Palos	Merced	508	49.27%	437	42.39%	73	7.08%	13	1.26%	71	6.89%	1,031	9.98%
Gustine	Merced	753	58.24%	418	32.33%	103	7.97%	19	1.47%	335	25.91%	1,293	-2.60%
Livingston	Merced	900	75.50%	232	19.46%	51	4.28%	9	0.76%	668	56.04%	1,192	13.71%
Los Banos	Merced	2,802	53.23%	1,938	36.82%	440	8.36%	84	1.60%	864	16.41%	5,264	5.75%
Merced	Merced	7,120	48.52%	6,311	43.01%	918	6.26%	324	2.21%	809	5.51%	14,673	3.14%
Unincorporated Area	Merced	7,341	41.10%	8,818	49.36%	1,391	7.79%	313	1.75%	-1,477	-8.27%	17,863	-1.86%
Alturas	Modoc	404	41.02%	409	41.52%	155	15.74%	17	1.73%	-5	-0.51%	985	20.75%
Unincorporated Area	Modoc	737	27.93%	1,504	56.99%	307	11.63%	91	3.45%	-767	-29.06%	2,639	0.59%
Unapportioned Absentees	Modoc	227	33.43%	372	54.79%	66	9.72%	14	2.06%	-145	-21.35%	679	N/A
Mammoth Lakes	Mono	684	44.94%	576	37.84%	195	12.81%	67	4.40%	108	7.10%	1,522	N/A
Unincorporated Area	Mono	562	34.29%	802	48.93%	204	12.45%	71	4.33%	-240	-14.64%	1,639	10.53%
Unapportioned Absentees	Mono	334	35.91%	504	54.19%	48	5.16%	44	4.73%	-170	-18.28%	930	N/A
Carmel-by-the-Sea	Monterey	1,363	47.31%	1,177	40.85%	181	6.28%	160	5.55%	186	6.46%	2,881	3.65%
Del Rey Oaks	Monterey	483	50.95%	337	35.55%	90	9.49%	38	4.01%	146	15.40%	948	17.93%
Gonzales	Monterey	804	70.53%	261	22.89%	63	5.53%	12	1.05%	543	47.63%	1,140	26.75%
Greenfield	Monterey	958	67.90%	368	26.08%	65	4.61%	20	1.42%	590	41.81%	1,411	26.62%
King City	Monterey	771	50.79%	638	42.03%	90	5.93%	19	1.25%	133	8.76%	1,518	30.41%
Marina	Monterey	3,053	57.16%	1,771	33.16%	385	7.21%	132	2.47%	1,282	24.00%	5,341	30.04%
Monterey	Monterey	6,248	54.30%	4,037	35.09%	701	6.09%	520	4.52%	2,211	19.22%	11,506	17.04%
Pacific Grove	Monterey	4,624	56.56%	2,522	30.85%	510	6.24%	519	6.35%	2,102	25.71%	8,175	9.15%
Salinas	Monterey	16,931	58.54%	9,544	33.00%	1,873	6.48%	574	1.98%	7,387	25.54%	28,922	26.06%
Sand City	Monterey	35	50.00%	21	30.00%	8	11.43%	6	8.57%	14	20.00%	70	-2.00%
Seaside	Monterey	4,803	65.70%	1,830	25.03%	488	6.67%	190	2.60%	2,973	40.66%	7,311	16.54%
Soledad	Monterey	1,091	75.14%	280	19.28%	61	4.20%	20	1.38%	811	55.85%	1,452	18.81%
Unincorporated Area	Monterey	16,536	43.65%	17,008	44.90%	2,725	7.19%	1,613	4.26%	-472	-1.25%	37,882	12.52%
American Canyon	Napa	1,524	57.90%	734	27.89%	316	12.01%	58	2.20%	790	30.02%	2,632	N/A
Calistoga	Napa	669	53.35%	397	31.66%	121	9.65%	67	5.34%	272	21.69%	1,254	14.69%
Napa	Napa	11,116	53.79%	6,787	32.84%	1,885	9.12%	877	4.24%	4,329	20.95%	20,665	17.75%
St. Helena	Napa	896	53.46%	534	31.86%	143	8.53%	103	6.15%	362	21.60%	1,676	25.17%
Yountville	Napa	657	56.69%	348	30.03%	117	10.09%	37	3.19%	309	26.66%	1,159	10.79%
Unincorporated Area	Napa	4,155	44.16%	3,828	40.68%	898	9.54%	529	5.62%	327	3.48%	9,410	11.57%
Unapportioned Absentees	Napa	5,571	48.35%	4,811	41.75%	774	6.72%	367	3.18%	760	6.60%	11,523	17.27%
Grass Valley	Nevada	712	44.89%	580	36.57%	110	6.94%	184	11.60%	132	8.32%	1,586	17.21%
Nevada City	Nevada	1,587	41.61%	1,660	43.52%	330	8.65%	237	6.21%	-73	-1.91%	3,814	-16.51%
Truckee	Nevada	2,130	44.00%	1,958	40.45%	442	9.13%	311	6.42%	172	3.55%	4,841	N/A
Unincorporated Area	Nevada	10,940	33.17%	17,586	53.33%	2,448	7.42%	2,004	6.08%	-6,646	-20.15%	32,978	-2.98%
Anaheim	Orange	28,924	40.38%	34,999	48.86%	5,981	8.35%	1,722	2.40%	-6,075	-8.48%	71,626	27.15%
Brea	Orange	4,931	34.70%	7,872	55.40%	1,068	7.52%	339	2.39%	-2,941	-20.70%	14,210	22.54%
Buena Park	Orange	8,235	44.08%	8,212	43.96%	1,821	9.75%	413	2.21%	23	0.12%	18,681	28.61%
Costa Mesa	Orange	11,949	36.97%	16,213	50.16%	2,817	8.72%	1,344	4.16%	-4,264	-13.19%	32,323	17.38%
Cypress	Orange	6,972	40.24%	8,322	48.03%	1,588	9.17%	443	2.56%	-1,350	-7.79%	17,325	24.76%
Dana Point	Orange	4,917	33.88%	7,861	54.16%	1,243	8.56%	493	3.40%	-2,944	-20.28%	14,514	N/A
Fountain Valley	Orange	8,169	36.05%	12,209	53.88%	1,682	7.42%	600	2.65%	-4,040	-17.83%	22,660	24.02%
Fullerton	Orange	15,132	38.30%	20,307	51.40%	2,971	7.52%	1,094	2.77%	-5,175	-13.10%	39,504	23.43%
Garden Grove	Orange	16,675	42.42%	18,179	46.25%	3,425	8.71%	1,026	2.61%	-1,504	-3.83%	39,305	27.62%
Huntington Beach	Orange	28,044	36.72%	39,004	51.07%	6,668	8.73%	2,652	3.47%	-10,960	-14.35%	76,368	21.82%
Irvine	Orange	18,569	40.34%	23,058	50.09%	2,866	6.23%	1,536	3.34%	-4,489	-9.75%	46,029	24.15%
La Habra	Orange	6,284	40.29%	7,654	49.08%	1,273	8.16%	384	2.46%	-1,370	-8.78%	15,595	23.91%
La Palma	Orange	2,292	41.77%	2,644	48.19%	443	8.07%	108	1.97%	-352	-6.42%	5,487	33.89%
Laguna Beach	Orange	5,999	48.24%	4,864	39.12%	828	6.66%	744	5.98%	1,135	9.13%	12,435	14.51%
Laguna Hills	Orange	3,784	33.87%	6,326	56.63%	790	7.07%	271	2.43%	-2,542	-22.76%	11,171	N/A
Laguna Niguel	Orange	8,220	33.45%	13,984	56.91%	1,722	7.01%	646	2.63%	-5,764	-23.46%	24,572	N/A
Lake Forest	Orange	7,511	34.19%	12,069	54.94%	1,837	8.36%	552	2.51%	-4,558	-20.75%	21,969	N/A
Los Alamitos	Orange	1,733	41.23%	1,965	46.75%	350	8.33%	155	3.69%	-232	-5.52%	4,203	20.17%
Mission Viejo	Orange	12,654	33.35%	21,712	57.22%	2,725	7.18%	855	2.25%	-9,058	-23.87%	37,946	24.61%
Newport Beach	Orange	10,076	28.63%	21,921	62.29%	2,168	6.16%	1,025	2.91%	-11,845	-33.66%	35,190	17.30%
Orange	Orange	14,032	34.07%	22,751	55.23%	3,296	8.00%	1,112	2.70%	-8,719	-21.17%	41,191	22.06%
Placentia	Orange	5,673	35.94%	8,615	54.58%	1,162	7.36%	335	2.12%	-2,942	-18.64%	15,785	23.05%
San Clemente	Orange	5,917	30.47%	11,265	58.00%	1,623	8.36%	617	3.18%	-5,348	-27.54%	19,422	10.52%
San Juan Capistrano	Orange	3,504	31.09%	6,600	58.56%	860	7.63%	306	2.72%	-3,096	-27.47%	11,270	15.78%
Santa Ana	Orange	24,314	54.54%	16,432	36.86%	2,748	6.16%	1,088	2.44%	7,882	17.68%	44,582	35.35%
Seal Beach	Orange	6,046	43.54%	6,500	46.81%	894	6.44%	447	3.22%	-454	-3.27%	13,887	17.14%
Stanton	Orange	3,206	48.52%	2,565	38.82%	668	10.11%	169	2.56%	641	9.70%	6,608	30.21%
Tustin	Orange	6,484	37.65%	9,020	52.37%	1,271	7.38%	449	2.61%	-2,536	-14.72%	17,224	25.44%
Villa Park	Orange	655	19.95%	2,393	72.87%	176	5.36%	60	1.83%	-1,738	-52.92%	3,284	15.65%
Westminster	Orange	9,945	41.33%	11,630	48.34%	1,857	7.72%	629	2.61%	-1,685	-7.00%	24,061	25.94%
Yorba Linda	Orange	7,076	28.51%	15,623	62.95%	1,626	6.55%	495	1.99%	-8,547	-34.44%	24,820	22.25%
Unincorporated Area	Orange	29,563	36.35%	43,948	54.04%	5,748	7.07%	2,068	2.54%	-14,385	-17.69%	81,327	24.62%
Auburn	Placer	2,332	40.10%	2,826	48.59%	408	7.02%	250	4.30%	-494	-8.49%	5,816	6.44%
Colfax	Placer	260	47.10%	212	38.41%	50	9.06%	30	5.43%	48	8.70%	552	3.75%
Lincoln	Placer	1,161	43.55%	1,224	45.91%	208	7.80%	73	2.74%	-63	-2.36%	2,666	8.46%
Loomis	Placer	950	28.92%	1,464	44.57%	741	22.56%	130	3.96%	-514	-15.65%	3,285	6.49%
Rocklin	Placer	4,124	32.48%	6,631	52.22%	1,606	12.65%	337	2.65%	-2,507	-19.74%	12,698	7.57%
Roseville	Placer	10,421	41.25%	14,035	55.56%	223	0.88%	582	2.30%	-3,614	-14.31%	25,261	2.78%
Unincorporated Area	Placer	15,733	35.64%	23,416	53.04%	3,306	7.49%	1,693	3.83%	-7,683	-17.40%	44,148	2.46%
Portola	Plumas	282	46.15%	240	39.28%	67	10.97%	22	3.60%	42	6.87%	611	-17.71%
Unincorporated Area	Plumas	3,258	35.65%	4,665	51.04%	852	9.32%	364	3.98%	-1,407	-15.40%	9,139	-9.23%
Banning	Riverside	3,539	46.26%	3,348	43.76%	629	8.22%	134	1.75%	191	2.50%	7,650	6.39%
Beaumont	Riverside	1,103	42.21%	1,108	42.40%	347	13.28%	55	2.10%	-5	-0.19%	2,613	9.09%
Blythe	Riverside	1,224	50.45%	959	39.53%	212	8.74%	31	1.28%	265	10.92%	2,426	16.03%
Calimesa	Riverside	1,203	39.70%	1,473	48.61%	293	9.67%	61	2.01%	-270	-8.91%	3,030	N/A
Canyon Lake	Riverside	1,113	27.65%	2,466	61.25%	371	9.22%	76	1.89%	-1,353	-33.61%	4,026	N/A
Cathedral City	Riverside	3,846	47.45%	3,272	40.37%	837	10.33%	150	1.85%	574	7.08%	8,105	16.97%
Coachella	Riverside	1,758	84.03%	203	9.70%	113	5.40%	18	0.86%	1,555	74.33%	2,092	14.69%
Corona	Riverside	10,446	41.03%	12,241	48.08%	2,223	8.73%	550	2.16%	-1,795	-7.05%	25,460	26.64%
Desert Hot Springs	Riverside	1,418	44.35%	1,192	37.28%	494	15.45%	93	2.91%	226	7.07%	3,197	10.45%
Hemet	Riverside	7,552	43.48%	8,033	46.25%	1,475	8.49%	307	1.77%	-481	-2.77%	17,367	18.04%
Indian Wells	Riverside	403	20.85%	1,411	73.00%	88	4.55%	31	1.60%	-1,008	-52.15%	1,933	15.72%
Indio	Riverside	3,795	54.83%	2,272	32.83%	724	10.46%	130	1.88%	1,523	22.01%	6,921	19.64%
La Quinta	Riverside	2,258	42.15%	2,342	43.72%	598	11.16%	159	2.97%	-84	-1.57%	5,357	31.33%
Lake Elsinore	Riverside	1,826	31.40%	3,217	55.31%	649	11.16%	124	2.13%	-1,391	-23.92%	5,816	-7.51%
Moreno Valley	Riverside	16,477	51.56%	12,123	37.94%	2,678	8.38%	676	2.12%	4,354	13.63%	31,954	37.00%
Murrieta	Riverside	4,317	32.31%	7,658	57.32%	1,111	8.32%	274	2.05%	-3,341	-25.01%	13,360	N/A
Norco	Riverside	2,330	34.59%	3,473	51.56%	770	11.43%	163	2.42%	-1,143	-16.97%	6,736	22.31%
Palm Desert	Riverside	4,801	34.03%	7,895	55.96%	1,163	8.24%	250	1.77%	-3,094	-21.93%	14,109	14.80%
Palm Springs	Riverside	7,271	48.89%	6,086	40.92%	1,176	7.91%	339	2.28%	1,185	7.97%	14,872	14.23%
Perris	Riverside	3,328	57.86%	1,788	31.08%	517	8.99%	119	2.07%	1,540	26.77%	5,752	26.88%
Rancho Mirage	Riverside	1,956	36.46%	2,953	55.04%	376	7.01%	80	1.49%	-997	-18.58%	5,365	14.84%
Riverside	Riverside	32,109	47.91%	27,559	41.12%	5,342	7.97%	2,016	3.01%	4,550	6.79%	67,026	19.87%
San Jacinto	Riverside	2,671	44.79%	2,620	43.94%	546	9.16%	126	2.11%	51	0.86%	5,963	10.10%
Temecula	Riverside	4,424	31.20%	8,295	58.50%	1,147	8.09%	313	2.21%	-3,871	-27.30%	14,179	N/A
Unincorporated Area	Riverside	47,411	40.77%	54,624	46.97%	11,602	9.98%	2,654	2.28%	-7,213	-6.20%	116,291	18.22%
Folsom	Sacramento	6,045	37.11%	8,902	54.65%	925	5.68%	416	2.55%	-2,857	-17.54%	16,288	15.78%
Galt	Sacramento	2,127	42.25%	2,381	47.30%	398	7.91%	128	2.54%	-254	-5.05%	5,034	4.11%
Isleton	Sacramento	218	60.56%	100	27.78%	30	8.33%	12	3.33%	118	32.78%	360	15.95%
Sacramento	Sacramento	77,137	61.75%	36,353	29.10%	5,960	4.77%	5,471	4.38%	40,784	32.65%	124,921	13.36%
Unincorporated Area	Sacramento	117,492	45.05%	118,313	45.36%	16,543	6.34%	8,455	3.24%	-821	-0.31%	260,803	14.49%
Hollister	San Benito	4,328	58.99%	2,344	31.95%	492	6.71%	173	2.36%	1,984	27.04%	7,337	23.60%
San Juan Bautista	San Benito	346	57.86%	187	31.27%	35	5.85%	30	5.02%	159	26.59%	598	10.94%
Unincorporated Area	San Benito	2,356	39.47%	2,853	47.80%	517	8.66%	243	4.07%	-497	-8.33%	5,969	17.82%
Adelanto	San Bernardino	1,305	45.93%	1,124	39.56%	343	12.07%	69	2.43%	181	6.37%	2,841	27.90%
Apple Valley	San Bernardino	5,418	32.24%	9,288	55.27%	1,738	10.34%	362	2.15%	-3,870	-23.03%	16,806	N/A
Barstow	San Bernardino	2,728	50.46%	1,932	35.74%	605	11.19%	141	2.61%	796	14.72%	5,406	15.95%
Big Bear Lake	San Bernardino	703	30.04%	1,250	53.42%	325	13.89%	62	2.65%	-547	-23.38%	2,340	21.35%
Chino	San Bernardino	6,833	45.34%	6,535	43.36%	1,343	8.91%	360	2.39%	298	1.98%	15,071	33.03%
Chino Hills	San Bernardino	6,601	40.12%	8,135	49.45%	1,401	8.52%	315	1.91%	-1,534	-9.32%	16,452	N/A
Colton	San Bernardino	6,347	63.73%	2,569	25.80%	811	8.14%	232	2.33%	3,778	37.94%	9,959	25.66%
Fontana	San Bernardino	11,310	56.67%	6,306	31.60%	1,891	9.47%	451	2.26%	5,004	25.07%	19,958	32.20%
Grand Terrace	San Bernardino	1,734	41.64%	1,925	46.23%	378	9.08%	127	3.05%	-191	-4.59%	4,164	23.05%
Hesperia	San Bernardino	5,708	34.99%	8,255	50.61%	1,932	11.84%	416	2.55%	-2,547	-15.62%	16,311	14.31%
Highland	San Bernardino	4,854	47.72%	4,179	41.09%	953	9.37%	185	1.82%	675	6.64%	10,171	18.67%
Loma Linda	San Bernardino	2,014	38.99%	2,606	50.45%	366	7.08%	180	3.48%	-592	-11.46%	5,166	29.58%
Montclair	San Bernardino	3,372	53.36%	2,188	34.63%	590	9.34%	169	2.67%	1,184	18.74%	6,319	35.17%
Needles	San Bernardino	728	50.98%	428	29.97%	233	16.32%	39	2.73%	300	21.01%	1,428	18.42%
Ontario	San Bernardino	14,627	50.73%	10,844	37.61%	2,652	9.20%	708	2.46%	3,783	13.12%	28,831	36.12%
Rancho Cucamonga	San Bernardino	14,831	40.04%	18,245	49.25%	3,099	8.37%	868	2.34%	-3,414	-9.22%	37,043	27.97%
Redlands	San Bernardino	9,737	40.68%	11,750	49.09%	1,672	6.99%	777	3.25%	-2,013	-8.41%	23,936	18.59%
Rialto	San Bernardino	11,329	62.55%	4,966	27.42%	1,434	7.92%	383	2.11%	6,363	35.13%	18,112	32.55%
San Bernardino	San Bernardino	21,484	57.19%	12,321	32.80%	2,891	7.70%	870	2.32%	9,163	24.39%	37,566	19.26%
Twentynine Palms	San Bernardino	1,165	36.55%	1,435	45.03%	503	15.78%	84	2.64%	-270	-8.47%	3,187	26.43%
Upland	San Bernardino	8,578	38.17%	11,648	51.83%	1,695	7.54%	552	2.46%	-3,070	-13.66%	22,473	23.92%
Victorville	San Bernardino	6,695	42.82%	7,043	45.05%	1,545	9.88%	351	2.25%	-348	-2.23%	15,634	19.22%
Yucaipa	San Bernardino	5,184	37.00%	7,049	50.31%	1,387	9.90%	392	2.80%	-1,865	-13.31%	14,012	N/A
Yucca Valley	San Bernardino	1,988	33.60%	2,858	48.30%	891	15.06%	180	3.04%	-870	-14.70%	5,917	N/A
Unincorporated Area	San Bernardino	28,099	37.85%	35,256	47.49%	8,652	11.65%	2,230	3.00%	-7,157	-9.64%	74,237	19.17%
Carlsbad	San Diego	11,568	38.65%	15,369	51.35%	2,019	6.75%	972	3.25%	-3,801	-12.70%	29,928	19.01%
Chula Vista	San Diego	22,133	50.61%	17,652	40.36%	3,003	6.87%	947	2.17%	4,481	10.25%	43,735	29.56%
Coronado	San Diego	2,654	31.06%	5,197	60.83%	451	5.28%	242	2.83%	-2,543	-29.76%	8,544	14.74%
Del Mar	San Diego	1,300	47.83%	1,127	41.46%	140	5.15%	151	5.56%	173	6.36%	2,718	10.54%
El Cajon	San Diego	10,151	40.15%	12,194	48.23%	2,228	8.81%	708	2.80%	-2,043	-8.08%	25,281	24.06%
Encinitas	San Diego	10,998	44.33%	10,618	42.80%	1,756	7.08%	1,437	5.79%	380	1.53%	24,809	16.53%
Escondido	San Diego	12,377	35.77%	18,478	53.40%	2,791	8.07%	958	2.77%	-6,101	-17.63%	34,604	23.86%
Imperial Beach	San Diego	2,834	47.72%	2,314	38.96%	581	9.78%	210	3.54%	520	8.76%	5,939	28.32%
La Mesa	San Diego	10,071	44.11%	10,172	44.56%	1,797	7.87%	789	3.46%	-101	-0.44%	22,829	20.36%
Lemon Grove	San Diego	3,873	49.62%	2,971	38.06%	715	9.16%	247	3.16%	902	11.56%	7,806	26.19%
National City	San Diego	5,948	65.77%	2,501	27.65%	463	5.12%	132	1.46%	3,447	38.11%	9,044	32.78%
Oceanside	San Diego	19,033	41.19%	22,195	48.03%	3,735	8.08%	1,248	2.70%	-3,162	-6.84%	46,211	19.01%
Poway	San Diego	6,462	33.31%	10,918	56.28%	1,473	7.59%	546	2.81%	-4,456	-22.97%	19,399	22.68%
San Diego	San Diego	198,169	50.57%	155,912	39.79%	24,298	6.20%	13,465	3.44%	42,257	10.78%	391,844	21.51%
San Marcos	San Diego	6,003	38.82%	7,758	50.16%	1,249	8.08%	455	2.94%	-1,755	-11.35%	15,465	20.86%
Santee	San Diego	7,320	37.71%	9,590	49.40%	1,963	10.11%	538	2.77%	-2,270	-11.69%	19,411	23.96%
Solana Beach	San Diego	2,626	40.57%	3,210	49.59%	389	6.01%	248	3.83%	-584	-9.02%	6,473	15.39%
Vista	San Diego	8,028	36.19%	11,628	52.42%	1,948	8.78%	577	2.60%	-3,600	-16.23%	22,181	18.12%
Unincorporated Area	San Diego	48,416	32.73%	83,072	56.16%	12,038	8.14%	4,388	2.97%	-34,656	-23.43%	147,914	16.78%
San Francisco	San Francisco	209,777	72.25%	45,479	15.66%	9,659	3.33%	25,452	8.77%	164,298	56.58%	290,367	9.94%
Escalon	San Joaquin	785	40.97%	938	48.96%	157	8.19%	36	1.88%	-153	-7.99%	1,916	11.46%
Lathrop	San Joaquin	1,251	56.22%	739	33.21%	198	8.90%	37	1.66%	512	23.01%	2,225	N/A
Lodi	San Joaquin	6,448	36.83%	9,587	54.76%	1,085	6.20%	387	2.21%	-3,139	-17.93%	17,507	16.05%
Manteca	San Joaquin	5,547	42.89%	5,894	45.57%	1,210	9.36%	282	2.18%	-347	-2.68%	12,933	10.90%
Ripon	San Joaquin	981	28.86%	2,139	62.93%	216	6.35%	63	1.85%	-1,158	-34.07%	3,399	14.88%
Stockton	San Joaquin	29,883	54.70%	20,640	37.78%	2,974	5.44%	1,132	2.07%	9,243	16.92%	54,629	12.70%
Tracy	San Joaquin	6,419	47.69%	5,632	41.84%	1,106	8.22%	304	2.26%	787	5.85%	13,461	11.41%
Unincorporated Area	San Joaquin	15,939	40.80%	19,562	50.07%	2,746	7.03%	823	2.11%	-3,623	-9.27%	39,070	6.17%
Arroyo Grande	San Luis Obispo	2,729	37.27%	3,751	51.22%	580	7.92%	263	3.59%	-1,022	-13.96%	7,323	7.91%
Atascadero	San Luis Obispo	3,766	34.93%	5,469	50.72%	1,042	9.66%	506	4.69%	-1,703	-15.79%	10,783	8.84%
El Paso de Robles	San Luis Obispo	2,622	35.28%	3,993	53.73%	596	8.02%	221	2.97%	-1,371	-18.45%	7,432	12.97%
Grover City	San Luis Obispo	1,978	44.79%	1,860	42.12%	389	8.81%	189	4.28%	118	2.67%	4,416	4.64%
Morro Bay	San Luis Obispo	2,296	45.12%	1,951	38.34%	495	9.73%	347	6.82%	345	6.78%	5,089	7.03%
Pismo Beach	San Luis Obispo	1,753	39.94%	2,096	47.76%	364	8.29%	176	4.01%	-343	-7.81%	4,389	5.07%
San Luis Obispo	San Luis Obispo	10,085	50.78%	7,178	36.14%	1,226	6.17%	1,370	6.90%	2,907	14.64%	19,859	13.19%
Unincorporated Area	San Luis Obispo	15,166	36.81%	20,435	49.59%	3,512	8.52%	2,091	5.07%	-5,269	-12.79%	41,204	4.34%
Atherton	San Mateo	1,424	34.53%	2,389	57.93%	156	3.78%	155	3.76%	-965	-23.40%	4,124	17.00%
Belmont	San Mateo	6,641	58.99%	3,295	29.27%	787	6.99%	534	4.74%	3,346	29.72%	11,257	23.02%
Brisbane	San Mateo	913	63.10%	253	17.48%	165	11.40%	116	8.02%	660	45.61%	1,447	5.25%
Burlingame	San Mateo	7,138	56.50%	4,230	33.48%	720	5.70%	546	4.32%	2,908	23.02%	12,634	20.25%
Colma	San Mateo	247	73.95%	60	17.96%	18	5.39%	9	2.69%	187	55.99%	334	28.20%
Daly City	San Mateo	17,502	72.55%	5,022	20.82%	958	3.97%	642	2.66%	12,480	51.73%	24,124	23.31%
East Palo Alto	San Mateo	3,691	88.15%	237	5.66%	109	2.60%	150	3.58%	3,454	82.49%	4,187	4.50%
Foster City	San Mateo	6,738	58.11%	3,814	32.89%	680	5.86%	363	3.13%	2,924	25.22%	11,595	29.59%
Half Moon Bay	San Mateo	2,597	55.03%	1,510	32.00%	329	6.97%	283	6.00%	1,087	23.03%	4,719	15.35%
Hillsborough	San Mateo	1,932	35.67%	3,135	57.87%	232	4.28%	118	2.18%	-1,203	-22.21%	5,417	24.18%
Menlo Park	San Mateo	8,125	58.69%	4,379	31.63%	547	3.95%	792	5.72%	3,746	27.06%	13,843	13.12%
Millbrae	San Mateo	4,705	56.19%	2,890	34.52%	536	6.40%	242	2.89%	1,815	21.68%	8,373	20.12%
Pacifica	San Mateo	10,256	64.80%	3,504	22.14%	1,241	7.84%	825	5.21%	6,752	42.66%	15,826	11.24%
Portola Valley	San Mateo	1,272	47.41%	1,154	43.01%	115	4.29%	142	5.29%	118	4.40%	2,683	17.08%
Redwood City	San Mateo	14,527	59.64%	7,146	29.34%	1,640	6.73%	1,045	4.29%	7,381	30.30%	24,358	18.34%
San Bruno	San Mateo	8,816	64.25%	3,476	25.33%	984	7.17%	446	3.25%	5,340	38.92%	13,722	17.69%
San Carlos	San Mateo	7,781	56.28%	4,650	33.63%	838	6.06%	556	4.02%	3,131	22.65%	13,825	21.41%
San Mateo	San Mateo	21,108	59.98%	10,625	30.19%	2,141	6.08%	1,317	3.74%	10,483	29.79%	35,191	20.24%
South San Francisco	San Mateo	11,644	68.59%	3,801	22.39%	1,055	6.22%	475	2.80%	7,843	46.20%	16,975	14.54%
Woodside	San Mateo	1,220	40.41%	1,486	49.22%	173	5.73%	140	4.64%	-266	-8.81%	3,019	12.69%
Unincorporated Area	San Mateo	14,007	58.75%	6,440	27.01%	1,621	6.80%	1,773	7.44%	7,567	31.74%	23,841	13.52%
Unapportioned Absentees	San Mateo	20	58.82%	12	35.29%	2	5.88%	0	0.00%	8	23.53%	34	N/A
Buellton	Santa Barbara	623	39.71%	730	46.53%	142	9.05%	74	4.72%	-107	-6.82%	1,569	N/A
Carpinteria	Santa Barbara	2,869	53.69%	1,879	35.16%	371	6.94%	225	4.21%	990	18.53%	5,344	21.05%
Guadalupe	Santa Barbara	733	64.98%	287	25.44%	83	7.36%	25	2.22%	446	39.54%	1,128	21.88%
Lompoc	Santa Barbara	4,819	42.93%	5,053	45.02%	1,033	9.20%	319	2.84%	-234	-2.08%	11,224	21.04%
Santa Barbara	Santa Barbara	21,321	57.36%	11,391	30.64%	1,992	5.36%	2,469	6.64%	9,930	26.71%	37,173	14.22%
Santa Maria	Santa Barbara	7,435	42.41%	8,525	48.62%	1,208	6.89%	365	2.08%	-1,090	-6.22%	17,533	15.23%
Solvang	Santa Barbara	766	30.85%	1,490	60.01%	148	5.96%	79	3.18%	-724	-29.16%	2,483	11.89%
Unincorporated Area	Santa Barbara	32,084	43.19%	34,560	46.52%	4,480	6.03%	3,164	4.26%	-2,476	-3.33%	74,288	13.01%
Campbell	Santa Clara	7,574	55.14%	4,332	31.54%	1,156	8.42%	673	4.90%	3,242	23.60%	13,735	19.47%
Cupertino	Santa Clara	9,123	53.31%	6,182	36.13%	1,076	6.29%	731	4.27%	2,941	17.19%	17,112	25.38%
Gilroy	Santa Clara	5,374	56.88%	3,131	33.14%	632	6.69%	311	3.29%	2,243	23.74%	9,448	16.38%
Los Altos	Santa Clara	7,806	48.35%	6,654	41.22%	911	5.64%	773	4.79%	1,152	7.14%	16,144	21.93%
Los Altos Hills	Santa Clara	1,760	40.60%	2,178	50.24%	221	5.10%	176	4.06%	-418	-9.64%	4,335	17.60%
Los Gatos	Santa Clara	7,017	49.76%	5,563	39.45%	899	6.37%	623	4.42%	1,454	10.31%	14,102	19.07%
Milpitas	Santa Clara	8,658	57.75%	4,756	31.72%	1,126	7.51%	453	3.02%	3,902	26.03%	14,993	28.66%
Monte Sereno	Santa Clara	776	41.08%	935	49.50%	103	5.45%	75	3.97%	-159	-8.42%	1,889	19.33%
Morgan Hill	Santa Clara	5,094	47.47%	4,436	41.33%	859	8.00%	343	3.20%	658	6.13%	10,732	23.07%
Mountain View	Santa Clara	15,470	61.91%	6,359	25.45%	1,565	6.26%	1,593	6.38%	9,111	36.46%	24,987	19.20%
Palo Alto	Santa Clara	19,223	65.42%	6,664	22.68%	1,227	4.18%	2,272	7.73%	12,559	42.74%	29,386	8.72%
San Jose	Santa Clara	139,040	58.50%	74,019	31.14%	16,035	6.75%	8,575	3.61%	65,021	27.36%	237,669	21.90%
Santa Clara	Santa Clara	19,372	59.24%	9,479	28.99%	2,408	7.36%	1,444	4.42%	9,893	30.25%	32,703	20.89%
Saratoga	Santa Clara	6,280	41.59%	7,413	49.09%	917	6.07%	490	3.25%	-1,133	-7.50%	15,100	22.90%
Sunnyvale	Santa Clara	25,107	57.07%	13,797	31.36%	3,091	7.03%	2,002	4.55%	11,310	25.71%	43,997	25.77%
Unincorporated Area	Santa Clara	19,965	54.02%	12,393	33.53%	2,682	7.26%	1,916	5.18%	7,572	20.49%	36,956	10.60%
Capitola	Santa Cruz	2,682	59.15%	1,202	26.51%	302	6.66%	348	7.68%	1,480	32.64%	4,534	7.01%
Santa Cruz	Santa Cruz	17,102	63.41%	4,478	16.60%	1,315	4.88%	4,076	15.11%	12,624	46.81%	26,971	-0.96%
Scotts Valley	Santa Cruz	2,135	43.53%	2,133	43.49%	360	7.34%	277	5.65%	2	0.04%	4,905	17.18%
Watsonville	Santa Cruz	4,649	62.73%	2,119	28.59%	426	5.75%	217	2.93%	2,530	34.14%	7,411	17.19%
Unincorporated Area	Santa Cruz	31,682	53.48%	17,834	30.10%	4,152	7.01%	5,572	9.41%	13,848	23.38%	59,240	4.97%
Anderson	Shasta	982	40.76%	1,099	45.62%	278	11.54%	50	2.08%	-117	-4.86%	2,409	3.22%
Redding	Shasta	9,783	33.53%	16,417	56.26%	2,348	8.05%	631	2.16%	-6,634	-22.74%	29,179	-0.74%
Shasta Lake	Shasta	1,223	41.26%	1,308	44.13%	343	11.57%	90	3.04%	-85	-2.87%	2,964	N/A
Unincorporated Area	Shasta	8,860	31.19%	15,912	56.01%	2,906	10.23%	731	2.57%	-7,052	-24.82%	28,409	-4.36%
Loyalton	Sierra	107	38.77%	131	47.46%	30	10.87%	8	2.90%	-24	-8.70%	276	-22.24%
Unincorporated Area	Sierra	306	31.32%	502	51.38%	111	11.36%	58	5.94%	-196	-20.06%	977	-12.05%
Unapportioned Absentees	Sierra	160	35.24%	244	53.74%	29	6.39%	21	4.63%	-84	-18.50%	454	N/A
Dorris	Siskiyou	67	29.52%	125	55.07%	25	11.01%	10	4.41%	-58	-25.55%	227	-22.83%
Dunsmuir	Siskiyou	284	55.04%	146	28.29%	64	12.40%	22	4.26%	138	26.74%	516	1.74%
Etna	Siskiyou	81	30.00%	119	44.07%	51	18.89%	19	7.04%	-38	-14.07%	270	2.65%
Fort Jones	Siskiyou	60	30.93%	99	51.03%	26	13.40%	9	4.64%	-39	-20.10%	194	-13.19%
Montague	Siskiyou	129	42.86%	125	41.53%	40	13.29%	7	2.33%	4	1.33%	301	5.14%
Mt. Shasta	Siskiyou	522	47.63%	372	33.94%	133	12.14%	69	6.30%	150	13.69%	1,096	3.75%
Tulelake	Siskiyou	40	21.98%	113	62.09%	25	13.74%	4	2.20%	-73	-40.11%	182	-3.12%
Weed	Siskiyou	393	55.27%	206	28.97%	95	13.36%	17	2.39%	187	26.30%	711	-10.12%
Yreka	Siskiyou	770	37.07%	1,053	50.70%	190	9.15%	64	3.08%	-283	-13.63%	2,077	-5.87%
Unincorporated Area	Siskiyou	2,828	33.85%	4,290	51.35%	884	10.58%	353	4.23%	-1,462	-17.50%	8,355	-9.79%
Unapportioned Absentees	Siskiyou	1,848	42.36%	2,005	45.95%	346	7.93%	164	3.76%	-157	-3.60%	4,363	6.79%
Benicia	Solano	4,979	55.05%	2,943	32.54%	713	7.88%	409	4.52%	2,036	22.51%	9,044	17.39%
Dixon	Solano	2,140	45.28%	2,113	44.71%	341	7.22%	132	2.79%	27	0.57%	4,726	10.71%
Fairfield	Solano	11,430	55.74%	6,965	33.97%	1,603	7.82%	507	2.47%	4,465	21.78%	20,505	23.19%
Rio Vista	Solano	656	45.62%	602	41.86%	144	10.01%	36	2.50%	54	3.76%	1,438	13.58%
Suisun City	Solano	4,243	57.59%	2,349	31.89%	593	8.05%	182	2.47%	1,894	25.71%	7,367	20.10%
Vacaville	Solano	11,923	46.80%	10,811	42.43%	2,088	8.19%	657	2.58%	1,112	4.36%	25,479	14.70%
Vallejo	Solano	18,257	68.01%	6,127	22.83%	1,795	6.69%	664	2.47%	12,130	45.19%	26,843	17.68%
Unincorporated Area	Solano	1,995	38.74%	2,483	48.21%	485	9.42%	187	3.63%	-488	-9.48%	5,150	7.81%
Unapportioned Absentees	Solano	9,021	53.93%	6,349	37.96%	920	5.50%	437	2.61%	2,672	15.97%	16,727	23.66%
Cloverdale	Sonoma	1,061	53.21%	610	30.59%	217	10.88%	106	5.32%	451	22.62%	1,994	16.44%
Cotati	Sonoma	1,546	60.68%	601	23.59%	202	7.93%	199	7.81%	945	37.09%	2,548	3.17%
Healdsburg	Sonoma	2,413	56.09%	1,303	30.29%	313	7.28%	273	6.35%	1,110	25.80%	4,302	19.97%
Petaluma	Sonoma	12,168	57.92%	5,918	28.17%	1,548	7.37%	1,373	6.54%	6,250	29.75%	21,007	12.11%
Rohnert Park	Sonoma	8,307	56.75%	4,268	29.16%	1,263	8.63%	799	5.46%	4,039	27.59%	14,637	17.75%
Santa Rosa	Sonoma	29,985	55.49%	16,860	31.20%	3,935	7.28%	3,258	6.03%	13,125	24.29%	54,038	15.54%
Sebastopol	Sonoma	2,213	61.15%	782	21.61%	206	5.69%	418	11.55%	1,431	39.54%	3,619	12.62%
Sonoma	Sonoma	2,630	57.31%	1,343	29.27%	318	6.93%	298	6.49%	1,287	28.05%	4,589	16.04%
Windsor	Sonoma	4,533	53.40%	2,919	34.39%	728	8.58%	309	3.64%	1,614	19.01%	8,489	N/A
Unincorporated Area	Sonoma	35,882	54.32%	18,951	28.69%	5,132	7.77%	6,091	9.22%	16,931	25.63%	66,056	6.78%
Ceres	Stanislaus	2,953	50.99%	2,225	38.42%	515	8.89%	98	1.69%	728	12.57%	5,791	14.71%
Hughson	Stanislaus	470	43.88%	511	47.71%	80	7.47%	10	0.93%	-41	-3.83%	1,071	-2.02%
Modesto	Stanislaus	16,120	46.57%	14,964	43.23%	2,650	7.66%	881	2.55%	1,156	3.34%	34,615	7.61%
Newman	Stanislaus	835	54.65%	529	34.62%	127	8.31%	37	2.42%	306	20.03%	1,528	-5.93%
Oakdale	Stanislaus	1,885	43.19%	2,050	46.98%	345	7.91%	84	1.92%	-165	-3.78%	4,364	5.73%
Patterson	Stanislaus	1,236	53.83%	839	36.54%	173	7.53%	48	2.09%	397	17.29%	2,296	12.06%
Riverbank	Stanislaus	1,713	48.83%	1,497	42.67%	241	6.87%	57	1.62%	216	6.16%	3,508	1.84%
Turlock	Stanislaus	6,164	43.26%	6,903	48.44%	864	6.06%	319	2.24%	-739	-5.19%	14,250	7.13%
Waterford	Stanislaus	694	44.29%	656	41.86%	167	10.66%	50	3.19%	38	2.43%	1,567	2.43%
Unincorporated Area	Stanislaus	8,170	43.23%	8,827	46.70%	1,541	8.15%	363	1.92%	-657	-3.48%	18,901	2.76%
Unapportioned Absentees	Stanislaus	13,498	46.36%	13,402	46.03%	1,657	5.69%	559	1.92%	96	0.33%	29,116	12.41%
Live Oak	Sutter	582	50.35%	470	40.66%	80	6.92%	24	2.08%	112	9.69%	1,156	30.27%
Yuba City	Sutter	3,687	36.97%	5,475	54.90%	605	6.07%	206	2.07%	-1,788	-17.93%	9,973	11.81%
Unincorporated Area	Sutter	4,235	31.10%	8,319	61.10%	848	6.23%	214	1.57%	-4,084	-29.99%	13,616	7.52%
Corning	Tehama	550	38.30%	662	46.10%	194	13.51%	30	2.09%	-112	-7.80%	1,436	3.31%
Red Bluff	Tehama	1,442	40.65%	1,566	44.15%	447	12.60%	92	2.59%	-124	-3.50%	3,547	3.46%
Tehama	Tehama	69	44.52%	68	43.87%	15	9.68%	3	1.94%	1	0.65%	155	1.33%
Unincorporated Area	Tehama	3,844	33.01%	6,087	52.27%	1,412	12.13%	302	2.59%	-2,243	-19.26%	11,645	-0.86%
Unapportioned Absentees	Tehama	1,385	37.84%	1,909	52.16%	257	7.02%	109	2.98%	-524	-14.32%	3,660	2.41%
Unincorporated Area	Trinity	2,203	37.40%	2,530	42.95%	856	14.53%	302	5.13%	-327	-5.55%	5,891	6.98%
Dinuba	Tulare	1,481	49.65%	1,327	44.49%	146	4.89%	29	0.97%	154	5.16%	2,983	12.94%
Exeter	Tulare	833	35.13%	1,355	57.15%	137	5.78%	46	1.94%	-522	-22.02%	2,371	-2.21%
Farmersville	Tulare	621	58.36%	357	33.55%	71	6.67%	15	1.41%	264	24.81%	1,064	3.26%
Lindsay	Tulare	807	54.94%	541	36.83%	97	6.60%	24	1.63%	266	18.11%	1,469	25.74%
Porterville	Tulare	3,227	41.95%	3,796	49.35%	519	6.75%	150	1.95%	-569	-7.40%	7,692	11.50%
Tulare	Tulare	4,054	42.75%	4,700	49.57%	614	6.48%	114	1.20%	-646	-6.81%	9,482	-4.63%
Visalia	Tulare	9,490	34.13%	16,305	58.64%	1,509	5.43%	501	1.80%	-6,815	-24.51%	27,805	1.85%
Woodlake	Tulare	511	60.40%	277	32.74%	49	5.79%	9	1.06%	234	27.66%	846	19.03%
Unincorporated Area	Tulare	11,645	36.57%	17,614	55.32%	1,964	6.17%	616	1.93%	-5,969	-18.75%	31,839	2.09%
Sonora	Tuolumne	845	50.03%	638	37.77%	154	9.12%	52	3.08%	207	12.26%	1,689	12.41%
Unincorporated Area	Tuolumne	8,105	39.96%	9,748	48.06%	1,771	8.73%	659	3.25%	-1,643	-8.10%	20,283	2.36%
Camarillo	Ventura	10,009	40.85%	11,772	48.05%	2,037	8.31%	682	2.78%	-1,763	-7.20%	24,500	23.74%
Fillmore	Ventura	1,859	52.48%	1,327	37.46%	271	7.65%	85	2.40%	532	15.02%	3,542	27.42%
Moorpark	Ventura	4,217	41.13%	4,883	47.63%	875	8.53%	277	2.70%	-666	-6.50%	10,252	30.66%
Ojai	Ventura	1,576	44.84%	1,326	37.72%	376	10.70%	237	6.74%	250	7.11%	3,515	13.97%
Oxnard	Ventura	20,685	59.24%	10,587	30.32%	2,798	8.01%	850	2.43%	10,098	28.92%	34,920	33.42%
Port Hueneme	Ventura	2,776	50.52%	2,003	36.45%	544	9.90%	172	3.13%	773	14.07%	5,495	26.78%
Ventura	Ventura	18,431	45.25%	16,820	41.29%	3,818	9.37%	1,666	4.09%	1,611	3.95%	40,735	18.72%
Santa Paula	Ventura	3,990	56.27%	2,341	33.01%	590	8.32%	170	2.40%	1,649	23.25%	7,091	26.56%
Simi Valley	Ventura	14,671	38.00%	18,279	47.35%	4,580	11.86%	1,074	2.78%	-3,608	-9.35%	38,604	29.39%
Thousand Oaks	Ventura	18,582	38.82%	23,946	50.03%	3,831	8.00%	1,506	3.15%	-5,364	-11.21%	47,865	25.48%
Unincorporated Area	Ventura	13,976	40.31%	15,918	45.91%	3,334	9.62%	1,446	4.17%	-1,942	-5.60%	34,674	19.09%
Davis	Yolo	16,184	64.44%	5,932	23.62%	987	3.93%	2,010	8.00%	10,252	40.82%	25,113	5.91%
West Sacramento	Yolo	5,387	60.12%	2,637	29.43%	673	7.51%	263	2.94%	2,750	30.69%	8,960	7.64%
Winters	Yolo	873	49.69%	670	38.13%	144	8.20%	70	3.98%	203	11.55%	1,757	17.66%
Woodland	Yolo	7,236	48.80%	6,274	42.31%	935	6.31%	383	2.58%	962	6.49%	14,828	17.26%
Unincorporated Area	Yolo	3,353	45.18%	3,294	44.39%	411	5.54%	363	4.89%	59	0.80%	7,421	5.70%
Marysville	Yuba	1,441	40.78%	1,787	50.57%	244	6.90%	62	1.75%	-346	-9.79%	3,534	16.05%
Wheatland	Yuba	236	39.46%	283	47.32%	61	10.20%	18	3.01%	-47	-7.86%	598	9.21%
Unincorporated Area	Yuba	4,112	36.27%	5,901	52.05%	1,003	8.85%	322	2.84%	-1,789	-15.78%	11,338	7.94%
Totals		5,109,839	51.05%	3,828,380	38.25%	697,769	6.97%	372,552	3.72%	1,281,459	12.80%	10,008,540	16.28%

==== Cities & Unincorporated Areas that flipped from Democratic (1988) to Republican ====
- Martinez (Contra Costa)
- Nevada City (Nevada)
- Loyalton (Sierra)

==== Cities & Unincorporated Areas that flipped from Republican (1988) to Democratic ====
- Dublin (Alameda)
- Fremont (Alameda)
- Livermore (Alameda)
- Piedmont (Alameda)
- Pleasanton (Alameda)
- Jackson (Amador)
- Sutter Creek (Amador)
- Williams (Colusa)
- Brentwood (Contra Costa)
- Lafayette (Contra Costa)
- Moraga (Contra Costa)
- Orinda (Contra Costa)
- Walnut Creek (Contra Costa)
- South Lake Tahoe (El Dorado)
- Brawley (Imperial)
- Calipatria (Imperial)
- El Centro (Imperial)
- Holtville (Imperial)
- Imperial (Imperial)
- Unincorporated Area (Inyo)
- Wasco (Kern)
- Corcoran (Kings)
- Unincorporated Area (Lake)
- Agoura Hills (Los Angeles)
- Alhambra (Los Angeles)
- Artesia (Los Angeles)
- Azusa (Los Angeles)
- Bellflower (Los Angeles)
- Burbank (Los Angeles)
- Cerritos (Los Angeles)
- Claremont (Los Angeles)
- Covina (Los Angeles)
- Downey (Los Angeles)
- Duarte (Los Angeles)
- Glendale (Los Angeles)
- Hermosa Beach (Los Angeles)
- Hidden Hills (Los Angeles)
- Lakewood (Los Angeles)
- Lawndale (Los Angeles)
- Lomita (Los Angeles)
- Long Beach (Los Angeles)
- Monrovia (Los Angeles)
- Redondo Beach (Los Angeles)
- San Gabriel (Los Angeles)
- Signal Hill (Los Angeles)
- South Pasadena (Los Angeles)
- Temple City (Los Angeles)
- Torrance (Los Angeles)
- Walnut (Los Angeles)
- West Covina (Los Angeles)
- Whittier (Los Angeles)
- Novato (Marin)
- Ross (Marin)
- Dos Palos (Merced)
- Del Rey Oaks (Monterey)
- King City (Monterey)
- Marina (Monterey)
- Salinas (Monterey)
- St. Helena (Napa)
- Unincorporated Area (Napa)
- Grass Valley (Nevada)
- Buena Park (Orange)
- Laguna Beach (Orange)
- Santa Ana (Orange)
- Stanton (Orange)
- Banning (Riverside)
- Blythe (Riverside)
- Cathedral City (Riverside)
- Desert Hot Springs (Riverside)
- Moreno Valley (Riverside)
- Palm Springs (Riverside)
- Perris (Riverside)
- Riverside (Riverside)
- San Jacinto (Riverside)
- Adelanto (San Bernardino)
- Barstow (San Bernardino)
- Chino (San Bernardino)
- Fontana (San Bernardino)
- Highland (San Bernardino)
- Montclair (San Bernardino)
- Ontario (San Bernardino)
- Chula Vista (San Diego)
- Del Mar (San Diego)
- Encinitas (San Diego)
- Imperial Beach (San Diego)
- Lemon Grove (San Diego)
- San Diego (San Diego)
- Tracy (San Joaquin)
- Grover City (San Luis Obispo)
- Morro Bay (San Luis Obispo)
- Foster City (San Mateo)
- Portola Valley (San Mateo)
- Carpinteria (Santa Barbara)
- Cupertino (Santa Clara)
- Los Altos (Santa Clara)
- Los Gatos (Santa Clara)
- Milpitas (Santa Clara)
- Morgan Hill (Santa Clara)
- Sunnyvale (Santa Clara)
- Scotts Valley (Santa Cruz)
- Montague (Siskiyou)
- Dixon (Solano)
- Fairfield (Solano)
- Rio Vista (Solano)
- Vacaville (Solano)
- Ceres (Stanislaus)
- Modesto (Stanislaus)
- Live Oak (Sutter)
- Tehama (Tehama)
- Dinuba (Tulare)
- Lindsay (Tulare)
- Sonora (Tuolumne)
- Fillmore (Ventura)
- Ojai (Ventura)
- Oxnard (Ventura)
- Port Hueneme (Ventura)
- Ventura (Ventura)
- Santa Paula (Ventura)
- Winters (Yolo)
- Woodland (Yolo)
- Unincorporated Area (Yolo)
