= Walter Masters =

Walter Masters may refer to:

- Walter Ray Masters, son and running mate of Isabell Masters, perennial third-party candidate for President of the United States
- Walt Masters, American baseball pitcher and American football player
