= 1996 United States presidential election in Arkansas =

- November 5, 1996
- Turnout: 47% (VAP)

Nominee	Bill Clinton	Bob Dole	Ross Perot
Party	Democratic	Republican	Reform
Home state	Arkansas	Kansas	Texas
Running mate	Al Gore	Jack Kemp	Pat Choate
Electoral vote	6	0	0
Popular vote	475,171	325,416	69,884
Percentage	53.74%	36.80%	7.90%

Clinton
40–50%
50–60%
60–70%
70–80%
Dole
40–50%
50–60%
President before election
Bill Clinton
Democratic
Elected President
Bill Clinton
Democratic

The 1996 United States presidential election in Arkansas took place on November 5, 1996, as part of the 1996 United States presidential election. State voters chose six electors to the Electoral College, who voted for president and vice president.

Arkansas, incumbent President Bill Clinton's home state, was won by Clinton by a 17% margin of victory. Republican nominee Bob Dole did not put up a challenge in Arkansas, nor did billionaire businessman Ross Perot (Ref-TX), who had unsuccessfully run for president as an independent in the previous election. Perot won 7.90 percent of the popular vote in Arkansas in 1996, a significant total for a third party candidate.

Arkansas is the only state in the country to deliver any candidate an absolute majority of its popular vote in both this election and 1992. As of the 2024 presidential election, this remains the last time a Democratic nominee carried the state. Since then, Arkansas has shifted sharply toward the Republican Party, transforming from a Democratic stronghold into one of the most reliably Republican states in the country. In fact, the state shifted rightward from the previous presidential election by under 1%, thereby beginning Arkansas's ongoing rightward shift in every subsequent presidential race. This is also the last time a Democrat managed to flip any county in Arkansas.

This is also the last election in which Washington County, Columbia County, Arkansas County, Faulkner County, Union County, Garland County, Johnson County, Howard County, Calhoun County, Saline County, Perry County, Miller County, Van Buren County, Montgomery County, Madison County, Pike County, Logan County, White County, Lonoke County, Pope County, Independence County, Cleburne County, Yell County, Conway County, Franklin County, Grant County, Sharp County, Sevier County, Marion County, Stone County, Fulton County, Scott County, Prairie County, and Cleveland County voted for a Democratic presidential candidate.

Among white voters, 49% supported Clinton, while 41% supported Dole. 9% supported Perot.

== Primary elections ==
Primary results were on May 21, 1996.

=== Democratic primary ===
1996 Arkansas Democratic Primary
Candidate	Votes	%
Bill Clinton	236,547	78.75%
Uncommitted	30,416	10.12%
Lyndon LaRouche	20,401	6.79%
Elvena Lloyd-Duffie	13,025	4.34%
Total	343,203	100.00%

== Results ==
1996 United States presidential election in Arkansas
Party	Candidate	Running mate	Votes	Percentage	Electoral votes
Democratic	Bill Clinton (incumbent)	Al Gore (incumbent)	475,171	53.74%	6
Republican	Robert Dole	Jack Kemp	325,416	36.80%	0
Reform	Ross Perot	Patrick Choate	69,884	7.90%	0
Green Coalition	Ralph Nader	Winona LaDuke	3,649	0.41%	0
Libertarian	Harry Browne	Jo Jorgensen	3,076	0.35%	0
U.S. Taxpayers' Party AR	Howard Phillips	Herbert Titus	2,065	0.23%	0
America First	Justice Ralph Forbes	Andy Anderson	932	0.11%	0
Independent	Charles Collins	Rosemary Giumarra	823	0.09%	0
Looking Back	Isabell Masters	Shirley Masters	749	0.08%	0
Workers World Party	Monica Moorehead	Gloria La Riva	747	0.08%	0
Natural Law	Dr. John Hagelin	Dr. V. Tompkins	729	0.08%	0
Socialist AR	Mary Cal Hollis	Eric Chester	538	0.06%	0
Prohibition	Earl Dodge	Rachel Kelly	483	0.05%	0

=== Results by county ===
County	Bill Clinton Democratic		Bob Dole Republican		Ross Perot Reform		Various candidates Other parties		Margin		Total votes cast
County	#	%	#	%	#	%	#	%	#	%	Total votes cast
Arkansas	4,220	63.00%	1,910	28.52%	463	6.91%	105	1.57%	2,310	34.48%	6,698
Ashley	5,011	60.51%	2,428	29.32%	704	8.50%	138	1.67%	2,583	31.19%	8,281
Baxter	6,703	43.23%	6,877	44.35%	1,572	10.14%	353	2.28%	-174	-1.12%	15,505
Benton	17,205	37.59%	23,748	51.89%	4,147	9.06%	668	1.46%	-6,543	-14.30%	45,768
Boone	5,745	43.32%	6,093	45.94%	1,132	8.54%	292	2.20%	-348	-2.62%	13,262
Bradley	2,566	64.67%	1,146	28.88%	221	5.57%	35	0.88%	1,420	35.79%	3,968
Calhoun	1,306	56.98%	727	31.72%	237	10.34%	22	0.96%	579	25.26%	2,292
Carroll	3,689	41.81%	3,957	44.85%	986	11.18%	191	2.16%	-268	-3.04%	8,823
Chicot	3,090	70.26%	1,056	24.01%	233	5.30%	19	0.43%	2,034	46.25%	4,398
Clark	5,281	65.02%	2,112	26.00%	567	6.98%	162	1.99%	3,169	39.02%	8,122
Clay	3,848	65.63%	1,512	25.79%	464	7.91%	39	0.67%	2,336	39.84%	5,863
Cleburne	4,475	47.28%	3,807	40.23%	1,021	10.79%	161	1.70%	668	7.05%	9,464
Cleveland	1,741	57.57%	990	32.74%	268	8.86%	25	0.83%	751	24.83%	3,024
Columbia	4,730	52.66%	3,376	37.59%	678	7.55%	198	2.20%	1,354	15.07%	8,982
Conway	4,055	55.69%	2,307	31.68%	746	10.24%	174	2.39%	1,748	24.01%	7,282
Craighead	13,284	54.04%	9,210	37.47%	1,778	7.23%	310	1.26%	4,074	16.57%	24,582
Crawford	6,749	42.68%	7,182	45.42%	1,683	10.64%	200	1.26%	-433	-2.74%	15,814
Crittenden	8,415	59.11%	4,673	32.83%	554	3.89%	594	4.17%	3,742	26.28%	14,236
Cross	3,631	58.94%	2,000	32.47%	466	7.56%	63	1.02%	1,631	26.47%	6,160
Dallas	2,118	61.66%	1,041	30.31%	236	6.87%	40	1.16%	1,077	31.35%	3,435
Desha	3,230	70.94%	978	21.48%	247	5.42%	98	2.15%	2,252	49.46%	4,553
Drew	3,570	62.91%	1,657	29.20%	395	6.96%	53	0.93%	1,913	33.71%	5,675
Faulkner	12,032	49.88%	10,178	42.19%	1,528	6.33%	385	1.60%	1,854	7.69%	24,123
Franklin	3,269	52.83%	2,246	36.30%	626	10.12%	47	0.76%	1,023	16.53%	6,188
Fulton	2,361	55.91%	1,351	31.99%	455	10.77%	56	1.33%	1,010	23.92%	4,223
Garland	19,211	53.06%	13,662	37.73%	2,769	7.65%	564	1.56%	5,549	15.33%	36,206
Grant	2,948	53.25%	1,925	34.77%	557	10.06%	106	1.91%	1,023	18.48%	5,536
Greene	6,622	57.61%	3,757	32.68%	1,014	8.82%	102	0.89%	2,865	24.93%	11,495
Hempstead	4,983	65.99%	2,021	26.76%	501	6.63%	46	0.61%	2,962	39.23%	7,551
Hot Spring	6,002	59.10%	2,864	28.20%	1,123	11.06%	166	1.63%	3,138	30.90%	10,155
Howard	2,741	59.18%	1,478	31.91%	369	7.97%	44	0.95%	1,263	27.27%	4,632
Independence	6,240	53.66%	4,021	34.58%	1,126	9.68%	241	2.07%	2,219	19.08%	11,628
Izard	2,818	55.11%	1,678	32.82%	541	10.58%	76	1.49%	1,140	22.29%	5,113
Jackson	4,304	66.22%	1,525	23.46%	611	9.40%	60	0.92%	2,779	42.76%	6,500
Jefferson	19,701	71.18%	6,330	22.87%	1,284	4.64%	362	1.31%	13,371	48.31%	27,677
Johnson	3,585	52.47%	2,367	34.64%	757	11.08%	124	1.81%	1,218	17.83%	6,833
Lafayette	2,466	64.14%	971	25.25%	374	9.73%	34	0.88%	1,495	38.89%	3,845
Lawrence	3,652	59.47%	1,823	29.69%	609	9.92%	57	0.93%	1,829	29.78%	6,141
Lee	3,267	71.75%	1,013	22.25%	257	5.64%	16	0.35%	2,254	49.50%	4,553
Lincoln	2,517	68.62%	907	24.73%	221	6.03%	23	0.63%	1,610	43.89%	3,668
Little River	3,183	62.27%	1,409	27.56%	480	9.39%	40	0.78%	1,774	34.71%	5,112
Logan	3,832	47.89%	2,966	37.07%	1,048	13.10%	156	1.95%	866	10.82%	8,002
Lonoke	8,049	50.13%	6,414	39.95%	1,369	8.53%	224	1.40%	1,635	10.18%	16,056
Madison	2,504	46.76%	2,303	43.01%	461	8.61%	87	1.62%	201	3.75%	5,355
Marion	2,735	44.65%	2,312	37.75%	764	12.47%	314	5.13%	423	6.90%	6,125
Miller	6,469	51.73%	4,874	38.97%	1,043	8.34%	120	0.96%	1,595	12.76%	12,506
Mississippi	8,301	62.19%	3,919	29.36%	1,016	7.61%	111	0.83%	4,382	32.83%	13,347
Monroe	2,247	64.98%	973	28.14%	202	5.84%	36	1.04%	1,274	36.84%	3,458
Montgomery	1,830	52.89%	1,137	32.86%	427	12.34%	66	1.91%	693	20.03%	3,460
Nevada	2,279	62.44%	976	26.74%	345	9.45%	50	1.37%	1,303	35.70%	3,650
Newton	1,631	39.26%	1,927	46.39%	498	11.99%	98	2.36%	-296	-7.13%	4,154
Ouachita	6,635	62.54%	3,136	29.56%	733	6.91%	105	0.99%	3,499	32.98%	10,609
Perry	1,873	53.79%	1,143	32.83%	395	11.34%	71	2.04%	730	20.96%	3,482
Phillips	5,715	66.69%	2,205	25.73%	461	5.38%	189	2.21%	3,510	40.96%	8,570
Pike	2,362	55.41%	1,401	32.86%	441	10.34%	59	1.38%	961	22.55%	4,263
Poinsett	4,686	63.09%	2,034	27.39%	647	8.71%	60	0.81%	2,652	35.70%	7,427
Polk	2,824	42.28%	2,852	42.70%	876	13.12%	127	1.90%	-28	-0.42%	6,679
Pope	8,433	44.76%	8,243	43.75%	1,891	10.04%	273	1.45%	190	1.01%	18,840
Prairie	2,211	61.85%	1,025	28.67%	305	8.53%	34	0.95%	1,186	33.18%	3,575
Pulaski	75,084	58.78%	44,780	35.06%	6,014	4.71%	1,855	1.45%	30,304	23.72%	127,733
Randolph	3,213	57.04%	1,789	31.76%	561	9.96%	70	1.24%	1,424	25.28%	5,633
St. Francis	5,562	64.35%	2,523	29.19%	506	5.85%	53	0.61%	3,039	35.16%	8,644
Saline	14,027	48.90%	11,695	40.77%	2,612	9.11%	351	1.22%	2,332	8.13%	28,685
Scott	2,259	52.57%	1,426	33.19%	513	11.94%	99	2.30%	833	19.38%	4,297
Searcy	1,669	42.05%	1,786	45.00%	381	9.60%	133	3.35%	-117	-2.95%	3,969
Sebastian	15,514	43.89%	16,482	46.63%	2,899	8.20%	451	1.28%	-968	-2.74%	35,346
Sevier	2,553	57.69%	1,379	31.16%	446	10.08%	47	1.06%	1,174	26.53%	4,425
Sharp	3,573	51.26%	2,635	37.80%	687	9.86%	75	1.08%	938	13.46%	6,970
Stone	2,227	50.15%	1,526	34.36%	579	13.04%	109	2.45%	701	15.79%	4,441
Union	8,373	52.53%	6,053	37.97%	1,073	6.73%	441	2.77%	2,320	14.56%	15,940
Van Buren	3,521	51.77%	2,345	34.48%	830	12.20%	105	1.54%	1,176	17.29%	6,801
Washington	20,419	46.44%	19,476	44.30%	3,133	7.13%	939	2.14%	943	2.14%	43,967
White	10,204	48.61%	8,659	41.25%	1,828	8.71%	300	1.43%	1,545	7.36%	20,991
Woodruff	2,044	71.67%	598	20.97%	186	6.52%	24	0.84%	1,446	50.70%	2,852
Yell	3,749	56.43%	2,111	31.77%	714	10.75%	70	1.05%	1,638	24.66%	6,644
Totals	475,171	53.74%	325,416	36.80%	69,884	7.90%	13,791	1.56%	149,755	16.94%	884,262

==== Counties that flipped from Democratic to Republican ====
- Baxter
- Boone
- Carroll
- Newton
- Polk

==== Counties that flipped from Republican to Democratic ====
- Pope

=== By congressional district ===
Clinton won three of four congressional districts, including one that elected a Republican.

District	Clinton	Dole	Perot	Representative
1st	58%	33%	8%	Blanche Lincoln (104th Congress)
1st	58%	33%	8%	Marion Berry (105th Congress)
2nd	55%	37%	7%	Ray Thornton (104th Congress)
2nd	55%	37%	7%	Vic Snyder (105th Congress)
3rd	44%	45%	9%	Tim Hutchinson (104th Congress)
3rd	44%	45%	9%	Asa Hutchinson (105th Congress)
4th	60%	31%	8%	Jay Dickey

== See also ==
- United States presidential elections in Arkansas
- Presidency of Bill Clinton
