= Alfred Masters =

American soldier (1916–1975)

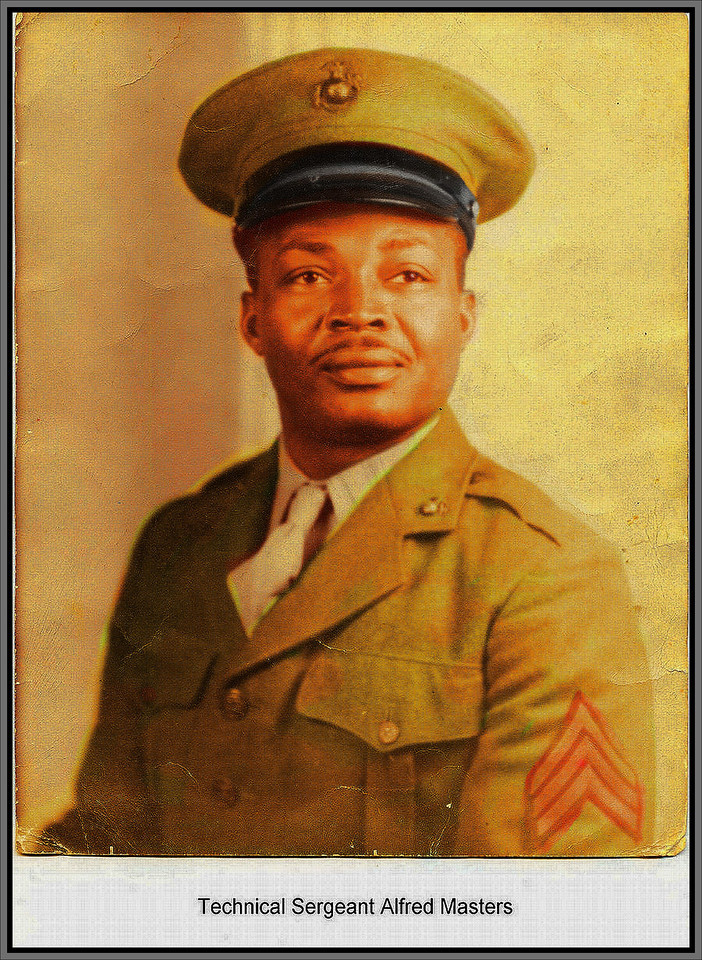
- Born: February 5, 1916; Palestine, Texas, U.S.
- Died: June 16, 1975 (aged 59); Anthony, New Mexico, U.S.
- Burial place: Fort Bliss National Cemetery
- Spouse(s): Isabell Masters (divorced), Mary Hendricks
- Military career
- Rank: Technical Sergeant
- Unit: United States Marine Corps

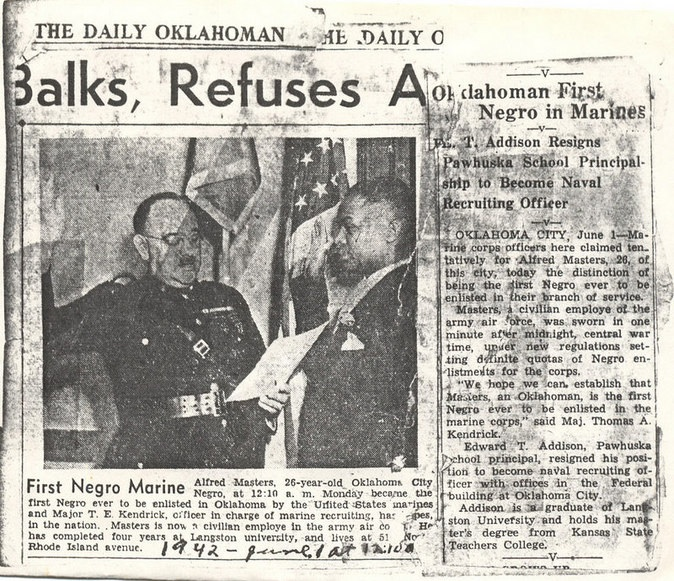
1942 article

Alfred Masters (February 5, 1916 – June 16, 1975) was an American member of the United States Marine Corps. Masters was the first African American member of the Marine Corps at his swearing-in on June 1, 1942, in Oklahoma City and then his first training camp was Montford Point in North Carolina. Masters rose to the rank of Technical Sergeant.

Masters married Isabell Masters. They had three daughters, Shirley Jean, Alfreda Dean and Cora Lavonne Masters, but the marriage ended in divorce in the 1940s.

Isabell Masters went on to become an educator and five-time U.S. presidential candidate. In 1994, their daughter Cora became the fourth wife of politician Marion Barry.

Alfred Masters married Mary Hendricks in 1949 and they had five children, 3 girls—Mary Ann Masters, Kathryn Louise Masters and Carolyn Donata Masters Faulkner—and 2 boys—Otto Joe Masters and Alfred Dan Masters.

Alfred Masters died in Anthony, New Mexico on June 16, 1975. He is buried at Fort Bliss National Cemetery in El Paso, Texas.
