= 1992 United States presidential election in California =

- November 3, 1992
- Turnout: 75.32% (of registered voters) ▲2.51 pp 54.52% (of eligible voters) ▲1.01 pp

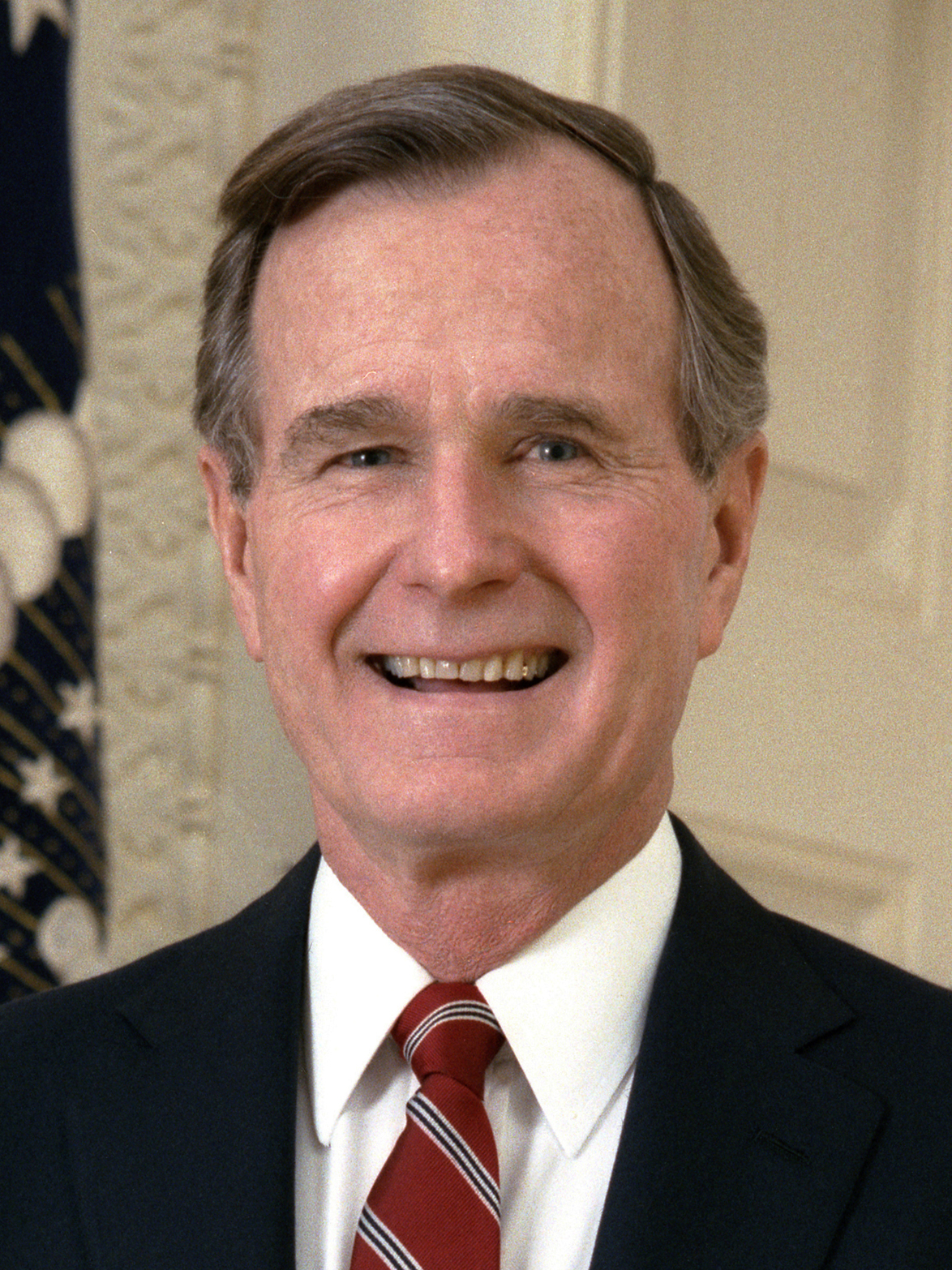

Nominee	Bill Clinton	George H. W. Bush	Ross Perot
Party	Democratic	Republican	Independent
Home state	Arkansas	Texas	Texas
Running mate	Al Gore	Dan Quayle	James Stockdale
Electoral vote	54	0	0
Popular vote	5,121,325	3,630,574	2,296,006
Percentage	46.01%	32.61%	20.63%
Clinton
30–40%
40–50%
50–60%
60–70%
70–80%
Bush
30–40%
40–50%
50–60%
Perot
30–40%
President before election
George H. W. Bush
Republican
Elected President
Bill Clinton
Democratic

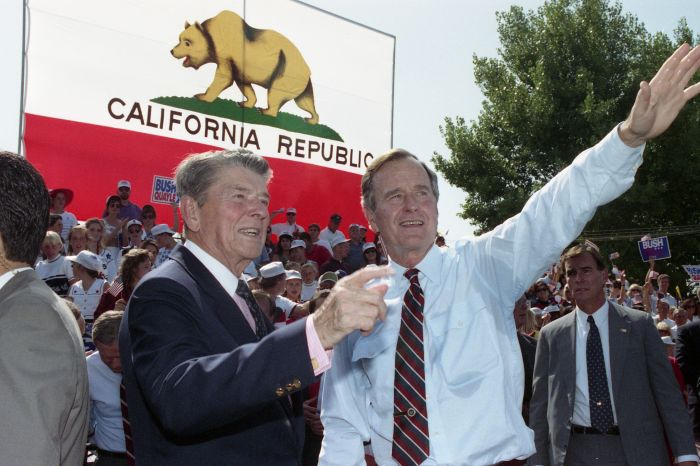
Ronald Reagan and George H. W. Bush campaigning in California

The 1992 United States presidential election in California took place on November 3, 1992, and was part of the 1992 United States presidential election. Voters chose 54 representatives, or electors to the Electoral College, who voted for president and vice president.

California voted for Democratic presidential candidate Bill Clinton. His victory marked the first time California had voted for a Democratic presidential nominee since Lyndon B. Johnson’s 1964 landslide, and only the second time since 1948. This would also be the first time since 1932 that a non-incumbent Democrat won California. Clinton's win in this state reflected the change in its status from a Republican-leaning swing state to a Democratic stronghold. California maintains the largest number of electoral votes in the Electoral College.

It was the first occasion that San Diego County had voted for a Democrat since Franklin D. Roosevelt in 1944; the county would not vote for the Democratic nominee again until the 2008 United States presidential election. As of the 2024 presidential election, this is the last time that any of the following counties were won by the Democratic nominee: Del Norte, Mariposa, Plumas, Siskiyou, Tehama, and Tuolumne. Ross Perot gained a plurality in Trinity County, the only time a non-major party candidate has carried any county in the state since Progressive Party candidate Robert La Follette Sr. in 1924. Perot also won the city of Avalon on Catalina Island, with 323 votes to George H.W. Bush's 315.

== Results ==
1992 United States presidential election in California
Party	Candidate	Votes	Percentage	Electoral votes
Democratic	William Jefferson Clinton	5,121,325	46.01%	54
Republican	George Herbert Walker Bush (Incumbent)	3,630,574	32.61%	0
Independent	Henry Ross Perot	2,296,006	20.63%	0
Libertarian	Andre Marrou	48,139	0.43%	0
Peace and Freedom	Ron Daniels	18,597	0.17%	0
Taxpayers’	Howard Phillips	12,711	0.11%	0
America First	James "Bo" Gritz (write-in)	3,077	0.03%	0
Natural Law	Dr. John Hagelin (write-in)	836	0.01%	0
Democrats for Economic Recovery	Lyndon LaRouche (write-in)	180	>0.01%	0
Other write-ins		149	>0.01%	0
Independent	Willie Carter (write-in)	131	>0.01%	0
Socialist Workers Party	James Warren (write-in)	115	>0.01%	0
Independent	Gene Smith (write-in)	18	>0.01%	0
Independent	Isabell Masters (write-in)	12	>0.01%	0
Invalid or blank votes		242,844	2.13%	—
Totals		11,374,565	100.0%	54
Voter turnout		54.52%		—

=== By county ===
County	Bill Clinton Democratic		George H.W. Bush Republican		Ross Perot Independent		Various candidates Other parties		Margin		Total votes cast
County	#	%	#	%	#	%	#	%	#	%	Total votes cast
Alameda	334,224	63.04%	109,292	20.62%	81,643	15.40%	4,986	0.94%	224,932	42.42%	530,145
Alpine	215	34.07%	222	35.18%	186	29.48%	8	1.27%	-7	-1.11%	631
Amador	5,286	34.25%	5,477	35.49%	4,553	29.50%	118	0.76%	-191	-1.24%	15,434
Butte	32,489	38.22%	31,608	37.18%	20,231	23.80%	686	0.81%	881	1.04%	85,014
Calaveras	5,989	35.25%	6,006	35.35%	4,848	28.53%	148	0.87%	-17	-0.10%	16,991
Colusa	1,798	31.91%	2,589	45.94%	1,206	21.40%	42	0.75%	-791	-14.03%	5,635
Contra Costa	194,960	50.93%	112,965	29.51%	72,518	18.94%	2,380	0.62%	81,995	21.42%	382,823
Del Norte	3,639	38.91%	3,083	32.96%	2,575	27.53%	56	0.60%	556	5.95%	9,353
El Dorado	21,012	32.38%	25,906	39.92%	17,503	26.97%	466	0.72%	-4,894	-7.54%	64,887
Fresno	92,418	42.17%	89,137	40.67%	36,299	16.56%	1,307	0.60%	3,281	1.50%	219,161
Glenn	2,666	30.24%	3,812	43.24%	2,278	25.84%	60	0.68%	-1,146	-13.00%	8,816
Humboldt	28,854	48.07%	18,299	30.49%	12,340	20.56%	528	0.88%	10,555	17.58%	60,021
Imperial	11,109	43.88%	9,759	38.55%	4,247	16.77%	203	0.80%	1,350	5.33%	25,318
Inyo	2,695	31.84%	3,689	43.58%	1,999	23.62%	81	0.96%	-994	-11.74%	8,464
Kern	60,510	33.75%	80,762	45.05%	36,891	20.58%	1,100	0.61%	-20,252	-11.30%	179,263
Kings	9,982	38.91%	10,673	41.61%	4,899	19.10%	97	0.38%	-691	-2.70%	25,651
Lake	10,548	45.44%	6,678	28.77%	5,797	24.97%	190	0.82%	3,870	16.67%	23,213
Lassen	3,388	32.70%	3,836	37.02%	3,004	28.99%	134	1.29%	-448	-4.32%	10,362
Los Angeles	1,446,529	52.54%	799,607	29.04%	488,624	17.75%	18,643	0.68%	646,922	23.50%	2,753,403
Madera	10,863	35.92%	13,066	43.20%	6,156	20.35%	160	0.53%	-2,203	-7.28%	30,245
Marin	76,158	58.27%	30,479	23.32%	22,986	17.59%	1,084	0.83%	45,679	34.95%	130,707
Mariposa	3,023	36.48%	2,982	35.98%	2,211	26.68%	71	0.86%	41	0.50%	8,287
Mendocino	18,344	50.21%	7,958	21.78%	9,753	26.69%	483	1.32%	8,591 (Note: In this county where Perot ran second ahead of Bush, margin given is Clinton vote minus Perot vote.)	23.52%	36,538
Merced	20,133	40.85%	17,981	36.48%	10,914	22.15%	256	0.52%	2,152	4.37%	49,284
Modoc	1,489	32.19%	1,803	38.98%	1,269	27.44%	64	1.38%	-314	-6.79%	4,625
Mono	1,489	34.19%	1,570	36.05%	1,248	28.66%	48	1.10%	-81	-1.86%	4,355
Monterey	54,861	47.01%	36,461	31.25%	24,472	20.97%	895	0.77%	18,400	15.76%	116,689
Napa	24,215	45.30%	15,662	29.30%	13,150	24.60%	428	0.80%	8,553	16.00%	53,455
Nevada	15,433	34.92%	17,343	39.24%	11,072	25.05%	353	0.80%	-1,910	-4.32%	44,201
Orange	306,930	31.56%	426,613	43.87%	232,394	23.90%	6,612	0.68%	-119,683	-12.31%	972,549
Placer	30,783	33.69%	38,298	41.92%	21,741	23.80%	544	0.60%	-7,515	-8.23%	91,366
Plumas	3,742	37.61%	3,599	36.17%	2,551	25.64%	57	0.57%	143	1.44%	9,949
Riverside	166,241	38.64%	159,457	37.06%	102,233	23.76%	2,344	0.54%	6,784	1.58%	430,275
Sacramento	197,540	43.56%	160,366	35.36%	91,412	20.16%	4,194	0.92%	37,174	8.20%	453,512
San Benito	5,354	42.03%	4,112	32.28%	3,182	24.98%	91	0.71%	1,242	9.75%	12,739
San Bernardino	183,634	38.74%	176,563	37.24%	109,183	23.03%	4,690	0.99%	7,071	1.50%	474,070
San Diego	367,397	37.24%	352,125	35.69%	259,249	26.28%	7,875	0.80%	15,272	1.55%	986,646
San Francisco	233,263	72.40%	57,352	17.80%	29,018	9.01%	2,574	0.80%	175,911	54.60%	322,207
San Joaquin	63,655	41.28%	58,355	37.84%	31,205	20.24%	995	0.65%	5,300	3.44%	154,210
San Luis Obispo	40,136	38.36%	36,384	34.78%	27,314	26.11%	785	0.75%	3,752	3.58%	104,619
San Mateo	149,232	53.97%	75,080	27.15%	50,465	18.25%	1,731	0.63%	74,152	26.82%	276,508
Santa Barbara	69,215	42.53%	57,375	35.25%	35,105	21.57%	1,061	0.65%	11,840	7.28%	162,756
Santa Clara	296,265	49.21%	170,870	28.38%	128,895	21.41%	6,025	1.00%	125,395	20.83%	602,055
Santa Cruz	66,183	58.06%	24,916	21.86%	21,615	18.96%	1,278	1.12%	41,267	36.20%	113,992
Shasta	21,605	31.61%	28,190	41.24%	17,990	26.32%	574	0.84%	-6,585	-9.63%	68,359
Sierra	653	34.83%	691	36.85%	519	27.68%	12	0.64%	-38	-2.02%	1,875
Siskiyou	8,254	39.91%	6,660	32.21%	5,567	26.92%	198	0.96%	1,594	7.70%	20,679
Solano	64,320	48.69%	38,883	29.43%	27,851	21.08%	1,057	0.80%	25,437	19.26%	132,111
Sonoma	104,334	52.78%	47,619	24.09%	43,859	22.19%	1,879	0.95%	56,715	28.69%	197,691
Stanislaus	52,415	40.95%	47,275	36.93%	27,651	21.60%	664	0.52%	5,140	4.02%	128,005
Sutter	7,883	30.48%	12,956	50.10%	4,881	18.87%	140	0.54%	-5,073	-19.62%	25,860
Tehama	7,508	35.79%	7,419	35.36%	5,884	28.05%	168	0.80%	89	0.43%	20,979
Trinity	1,967	32.63%	1,886	31.28%	2,092	34.70%	84	1.39%	-125 (Note: In this county where Perot ran ahead of Bush and Clinton, margin given is Perot vote minus Clinton vote.)	-2.07%	6,029
Tulare	31,188	35.22%	40,482	45.71%	16,430	18.55%	453	0.51%	-9,294	-10.49%	88,553
Tuolumne	9,216	38.12%	8,525	35.26%	6,294	26.03%	143	0.59%	691	2.86%	24,178
Ventura	99,011	36.99%	94,911	35.46%	71,844	26.84%	1,881	0.70%	4,100	1.53%	267,647
Yolo	33,297	53.33%	17,574	28.15%	11,073	17.73%	492	0.79%	15,723	25.18%	62,436
Yuba	5,785	34.24%	7,333	43.40%	3,637	21.53%	140	0.83%	-1,548	-9.16%	16,895
Total	5,121,325	46.01%	3,630,574	32.61%	2,296,006	20.63%	83,816	0.75%	1,490,751	13.40%	11,131,721

==== Counties that flipped from Republican to Democratic ====
- Butte
- Del Norte
- Fresno
- Imperial
- Mariposa
- Merced
- Monterey
- Napa
- Plumas
- Riverside
- Sacramento
- San Bernardino
- San Diego
- San Joaquin
- San Luis Obispo
- Santa Barbara
- Siskiyou
- Stanislaus
- Tehama
- Tuolumne
- Ventura

==== Counties that flipped from Republican to Independent ====
- Trinity
