= Isabell Masters =

American politician (1913–2011)

Isabell Masters (January 9, 1913 – September 11, 2011) of Topeka, Kansas, was a five-time perennial third-party candidate (Looking Back Party) for President of the United States.

Masters' five presidential campaigns are the most for any woman in U.S. history. She was a candidate in the 1984, 1992 (339 votes), 1996, 2000 and 2004 presidential elections. In 1996, she was only on the ballot in Arkansas (but also received a few votes in California and Maryland) (752 votes total, 2000). Her 1992 running mate was her son, Walter Ray Masters, and her 1996 running mate was her daughter, Shirley Jean Masters.

== Biography ==
=== Personal life ===
Isabell Masters was born Isabell Arch on January 9, 1913, in Oklahoma City, Oklahoma, the daughter of Cora McDaniels (Lewis) and Walter Arch. Her father, a businessman, was of African American and German descent. Masters graduated from Douglas High School in Oklahoma City and received a bachelor's degree in education from Langston University. She later earned a doctorate from the University of Oklahoma. An educator by profession, Masters taught in California, New York, Nevada and Kansas during her career. She specifically worked in schools in the American cities of Pasadena, Los Angeles, Las Vegas, Kansas City and Syracuse, New York.

Masters married Alfred Masters, who became the first African American to enlist in the United States Marines when he was sworn in on June 1, 1942. They had six children together, but their marriage disintegrated during the late 1940s. She raised six children as a single mother. Masters obtained her master's degree in higher education from the University of California, Los Angeles (UCLA). She later earned a doctorate from the University of Oklahoma during her late 60s.

=== Presidential campaigns ===
In 2000 she was a write-in candidate in Kansas alongside George W. Bush and Al Gore. Her vice-presidential running mate was her daughter, Alfreda Dean Masters.

She made several unsuccessful attempts at winning the Republican primary elections for President. In 1996 she was on the ballot in Oklahoma and won 1,052 votes (Bob Dole won by a large margin).

In addition to her presidential campaigns, Masters ran for the city council in Topeka, Kansas, and was once a candidate for Mayor of West Palm Beach, Florida.

Masters' six children include Rev. Thomas A. Masters Sr. of the New Macedonia Missionary Baptist Church in Riviera Beach, Florida, the current mayor of Riviera Beach who was a community leader protesting efforts by the George W. Bush legal team to stop the Florida election recount following the controversial 2000 United States presidential election, and political scientist Cora Masters, who became the fourth wife of former Washington, D.C. Mayor Marion Barry in 1994, but they later divorced.

Isabell Masters died in her sleep on September 11, 2011, at a nursing facility in Lake Worth, Florida, at the age of 98. She had lived with her son, Riviera Beach Mayor Thomas Masters, for the last four years of her life.
