= Jo Jorgensen =

American politician (born 1957)

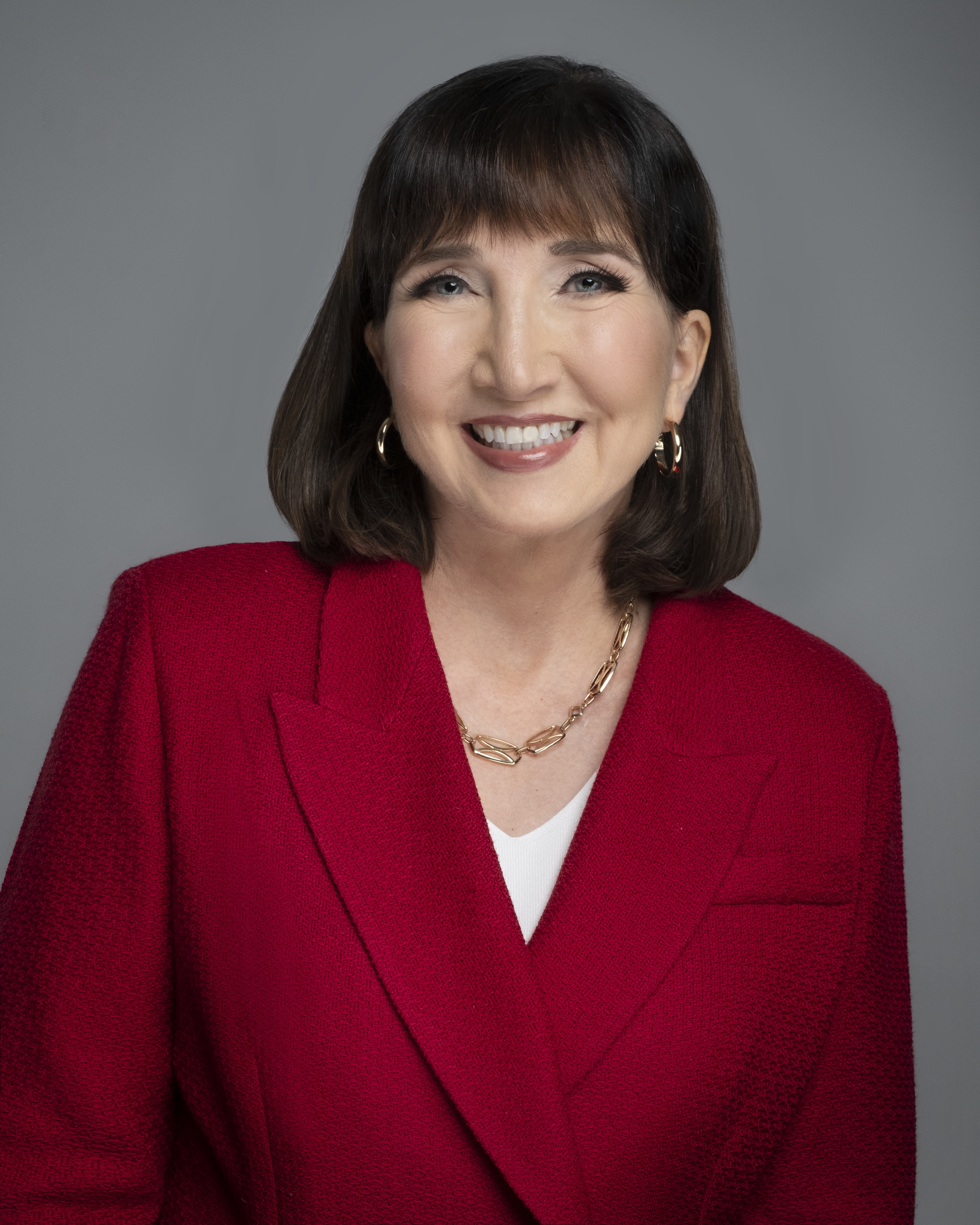
- Jorgensen in 2020
- Born: May 1, 1957 (age 69); Libertyville, Illinois, U.S.
- Education: Baylor University (BS); Southern Methodist University (MBA); Clemson University (PhD)
- Occupation: Academic
- Employer: Clemson University
- Political party: Libertarian
- Children: 2

Jo Jorgensen (born May 1, 1957) is an American libertarian political activist and academic. Jorgensen was the Libertarian Party's nominee for president of the United States in the 2020 election, in which she finished third in the popular vote with about 1.9 million votes, 1.2% of the national total. She was previously the party's nominee for vice president in the 1996 election, as Harry Browne's running mate. She is a full-time lecturer of psychology at Clemson University.

== Early life and career ==
Jorgensen was born on May 1, 1957, in Libertyville, Illinois, and raised in neighboring Grayslake. She is an alumna of Grayslake Central High School. Her grandparents were Danish immigrants.

Jorgensen received a Bachelor of Science degree in psychology at Baylor University in 1979 and a master's degree in business administration at Southern Methodist University in 1980. She began her career at IBM working with computer systems, leaving to become part owner and President of Digitech, Inc. She received a Ph.D. in Industrial and Organizational Psychology from Clemson University in 2002. She has taught full-time at Clemson since 2006.

== Political career ==
=== 1992 U.S. House of Representatives campaign ===
Jorgensen first ran for office in the 1992 United States House of Representatives election. She ran as a Libertarian to represent SC-04, in northwest South Carolina, against incumbent Democrat Liz J. Patterson and Republican challenger Bob Inglis. Jorgensen placed third with 2.2% of the total vote.

=== 1996 vice presidential campaign ===
Before the 1996 United States presidential election, the Libertarian Party nominated Jorgensen for vice president, as Harry Browne's running mate. She was nominated on the first ballot with 92% of the vote. She participated in a vice-presidential debate televised nationwide by C-SPAN on October 22, along with Herbert Titus of the Taxpayers Party and Mike Tompkins of the Natural Law Party.

Browne and Jorgensen, who were on the ballot in all 50 states and D.C., received 485,759 votes, finishing in fifth place with 0.5% of the popular vote. This was the Libertarian Party's best performance since 1980.

=== 2020 presidential campaign ===
On August 13, 2019, Jorgensen filed with the FEC to run for the Libertarian presidential nomination in the 2020 election. She formally launched her campaign at the November 2, 2019, Libertarian Party of South Carolina convention before participating in the South Carolina Libertarian presidential debate the same day.

In the non-binding Libertarian primaries, Jorgensen was second in the cumulative popular vote, winning two of the 12 primaries.

On May 23, 2020, Jorgensen became the Libertarian presidential nominee, making her the first woman to be the Libertarian nominee and the only female 2020 presidential candidate with ballot access to over 270 electoral votes. Spike Cohen, a mostly unknown figure in mainstream politics, was nominated for vice president. The same day, Jorgensen's supporters repurposed Hillary Clinton's unofficial 2016 campaign slogan, "I'm With Her". The slogan trended on Twitter that night and made national headlines. She registered minimal support in opinion polling.

Jorgensen released a list of potential Supreme Court nominees in September 2020 in response to the vacancy on the Court created by Justice Ruth Bader Ginsburg's death.

Jorgensen received more than 1.8 million votes in the general election, about 1.2% of the national total.

After the election, several media outlets speculated that Jorgensen's candidacy resulted in vote splitting significant enough to be decisive in Democrat Joe Biden's victory over Republican Donald Trump, pointing to Jorgensen's vote share being higher than Biden's margin of victory over Trump in multiple battleground states. While many pundits claimed that Trump would have won had she not run, others believed that many Jorgensen voters would have abstained from voting, as opposed to voting for Trump.

=== 2028 presidential exploratory committee ===
On May 28, 2026, Jorgensen announced that she was forming an exploratory committee to consider a possible run for the Libertarian presidential nomination in the 2028 election.

== Political positions ==
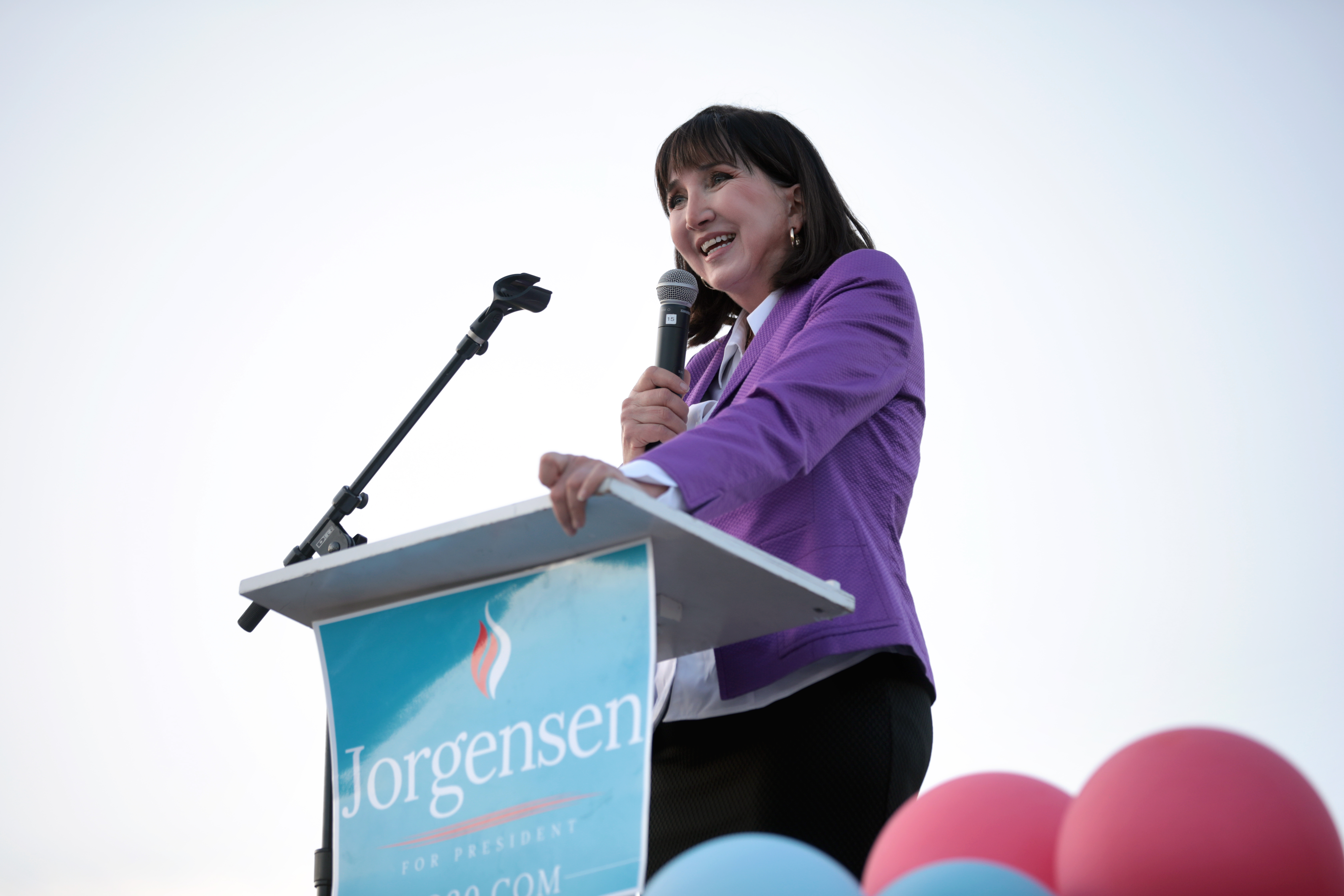
Jorgensen speaking at a rally in Scottsdale, Arizona, October 10, 2020

=== Healthcare and social security ===
Jorgensen supports a free-market healthcare system financed by individual spending accounts that could keep any savings, which she believes would increase healthcare providers' incentive to compete by meeting consumer demand for low-cost services. She opposes single-payer healthcare, calling it "disastrous".

Jorgensen supports replacing Social Security with individual retirement accounts. In the final debate of the 2020 primaries, candidate Jacob Hornberger accused Jorgensen of "support[ing] the welfare state through Social Security and Medicare". In response, she called Social Security a "Ponzi scheme". She then expressed the desire to allow people to opt out of the program on her first day in office, while emphasizing the constitutional inability of a president to unilaterally end the program without Congress's support, as well as the need for the government to fulfill existing Social Security obligations. Under Jorgensen's plan, those who opt out would put 6.2% of their payroll taxes in individual retirement accounts and receive prorated Social Security benefits for existing contributions as zero-coupon bonds for retirement.

=== Criminal justice and drug policy ===
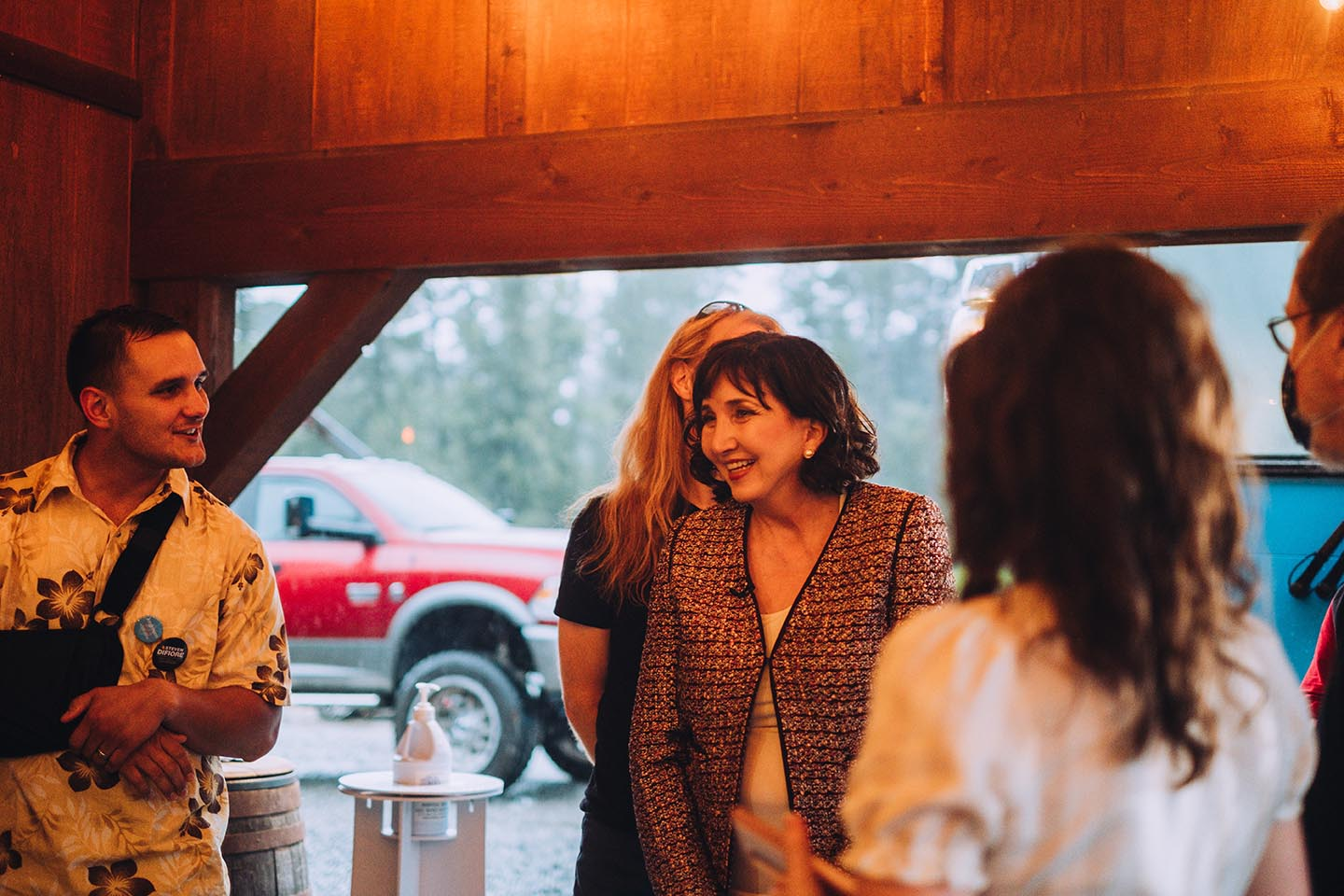
Jorgensen at a rally in Durham, North Carolina, in 2020

Jorgensen opposes federal civil asset forfeiture and qualified immunity. She opposes the war on drugs and supports abolishing drug laws, promising to pardon all nonviolent drug offenders. She has urged the demilitarization of police. Additionally, Jorgensen supports the Second Amendment.

=== Foreign policy and defense ===
Jorgensen opposes embargoes, economic sanctions, and foreign aid; she supports non-interventionism, armed neutrality, and the withdrawal of U.S. troops from abroad.

=== Immigration, economics, and trade ===
Jorgensen calls for deregulation, arguing that it would reduce poverty. She supports cutting government spending to reduce taxes.

Jorgensen supports the freedom of American citizens to travel and trade, calls for the elimination of trade barriers and tariffs, and supports the repeal of quotas on the number of people who can legally enter the United States to work, visit, or reside. In a Libertarian presidential primary debate, Jorgensen said she would immediately stop construction on President Donald Trump's border wall. During another primary debate she blamed anti-immigration sentiment on disproportionate media coverage of crimes by immigrants. She argued that immigration helps the economy and that the blending of cultures is beneficial.

=== COVID-19 ===
Jorgensen has characterized the U.S. government's response to the COVID-19 pandemic as overly bureaucratic and authoritarian, calling restrictions on individual behavior (such as stay-at-home orders) and corporate bailouts "the biggest assault on our liberties in our lifetime".

Jorgensen opposes government mask mandates, considering mask-wearing a matter of personal choice. She argues that mask-wearing would be widely adopted without government intervention because market competition would drive businesses to adopt either mask-required or mask-optional policies, allowing consumers the freedom to choose their preferred environment. Jorgensen has invoked the analogy of dollar voting to argue that consumer preferences would shape businesses' policies on face masks in the absence of a government mandate.

== Personal life ==
Jorgensen is married and has two adult daughters and a grandson. She briefly paused her presidential campaign after her mother's death on September 3, 2020.

== Electoral history ==
South Carolina's 4th Congressional District Election Results, 1992
Party	Candidate	Votes	%	±%
Republican	Bob Inglis	99,879	50.3	+11.9
Democratic	Liz J. Patterson (incumbent)	94,182	47.5	−13.9
Libertarian	Jo Jorgensen	4,286	2.2	+2.2
Majority		5,697	2.8	−20.2
Turnout		198,410		
Republican gain from Democratic				

1996 United States Presidential Election
Party	Candidate	Votes	%
	Bill Clinton/Al Gore (incumbent)	47,402,357	49.2%
	Bob Dole/Jack Kemp	39,198,755	40.7%
	Ross Perot/Pat Choate	8,085,402	8.4%
	Ralph Nader/Multiple People	685,297	0.7%
	Harry Browne/Jo Jorgensen	485,798	0.5%
	Howard Phillips/Herbert Titus	184,820	0.2%
	John Hagelin/Michael Tompkins	113,670	0.1%
{{{party}}}	Others	121,534	0.1%

2020 United States presidential election
Presidential candidate Vice presidential candidate	Party	Popular votes	%	Electoral votes
Joe Biden; Kamala Harris	Democratic	81,268,924	51.3%	306
Donald Trump (incumbent); Mike Pence	Republican	74,216,154	46.9%	232
Jo Jorgensen; Spike Cohen	Libertarian	1,865,724	1.2%	0
Howie Hawkins; Angela Walker	Green	405,035	0.3%	0
Others		627,566	0.4%	0
Total		158,383,403	100%	538

== See also ==
- List of female United States presidential and vice presidential candidates
- Third party and independent candidates for the 2020 United States presidential election

Party political offices
Preceded by Nancy Lord	Libertarian nominee for Vice President of the United States; 1996	Succeeded by Art Olivier
Preceded by Gary Johnson	Libertarian nominee for President of the United States; 2020	Succeeded by Chase Oliver
