= 1992 United States House of Representatives elections in South Carolina =

- November 3, 1992

All 6 South Carolina seats to the United States House of Representatives
	Majority party	Minority party
Party	Republican	Democratic
Last election	2	4
Seats won	3	3
Seat change	▲1	▼1
Popular vote	581,159	505,887
Percentage	52.10%	45.35%

Republican
50–60%
60–70%
70–80%
80–90%
>90%
Democratic
50–60%
60–70%
70–80%
Winners
Republican Hold
Republican Gain
Democratic Hold

The 1992 United States House of Representatives elections in South Carolina were held on November 3, 1992, to elect the six U.S. representatives from the state of South Carolina, one from each of the state's six congressional districts. The elections coincided with the 1992 U.S. presidential election, as well as other elections to the House of Representatives, elections to the United States Senate and various state and local elections.

Primary elections were held on August 25. In the general election, four incumbents were re-elected; however, incumbent Democrat Liz J. Patterson of the 4th district was defeated in her bid for a fourth term by Republican challenger Bob Inglis. Additionally, control of the open 6th district seat was retained by Democratic newcomer Jim Clyburn following the retirement of five-term incumbent Robin Tallon after the district's racial composition was significantly altered in redistricting. As of 2023, this is the last time South Carolina's congressional delegation comprised an equal number of Republicans and Democrats, and the last time Democrats would receive over 40% of the vote in U.S. House elections in the state until 2006.

== Redistricting ==
Following the 1990 United States census and subsequent redistricting cycle, South Carolina's congressional districts were redrawn by a federal court after the state legislature failed to produce their own map. The court's plan, which was issued on May 1, 1992, shifted the boundaries of each of the state's six congressional districts substantially; in the 1980s, South Carolina's districts were largely made up of whole counties, with only one (Berkeley County) being split between two districts. In contrast, the court-drawn lines split a total of 13 counties, 11 of which were divided and dispersed to create the new 1st, 2nd, 5th, and 6th districts. This splitting of counties was done largely to shift the 6th district, then-consisting of a predominantly white electorate, into a majority-minority seat that would allow the state's large black population to elect an African American to Congress.

== Overview ==
District	Republican		Democratic		Others		Total		Result
District	Votes	%	Votes	%	Votes	%	Votes	%	Result
District 1	121,938	66.07%	59,908	32.46%	2,703	1.46%	184,549	100.0%	Republican Hold
District 2	148,667	87.62%	0	0.00%	21,003	12.38%	169,670	100.0%	Republican Hold
District 3	75,660	38.83%	119,119	61.13%	85	0.04%	194,864	100.0%	Democratic Hold
District 4	99,879	50.34%	94,182	47.47%	4,349	2.19%	198,410	100.0%	Republican Gain
District 5	70,866	38.71%	112,031	61.19%	189	0.10%	183,086	100.0%	Democratic Hold
District 6	64,149	34.70%	120,647	65.26%	75	0.04%	184,871	100.0%	Democratic Hold
Total	581,159	52.10%	505,887	45.35%	28,404	2.55%	1,115,450	100.0%	

Popular vote
Republican	52.10%
Democratic	45.35%
Other	2.55%

House seats
Republican	50.00%
Democratic	50.00%

== District 1 ==
1992 South Carolina's 1st congressional district election
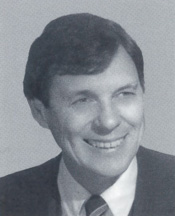

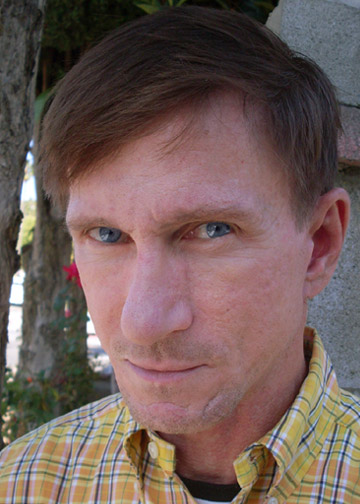
Nominee	Arthur Ravenel Jr.	Bill Oberst Jr.
Party	Republican	Democratic
Popular vote	121,938	59,908
Percentage	66.1%	32.5%
- County results Ravenel: 50–60% 70–80% Oberst: 50–60%
U.S. representative before election
Arthur Ravenel Jr.
Republican
Elected U.S. representative
Arthur Ravenel Jr.
Republican

The 1st district stretches from the coastal regions of the Pee Dee into the upper parts of the Lowcountry, including all of Georgetown and Horry counties, and taking in a sizable portion of Berkeley County; due to redistricting, the 1st lost a significant amount of its share of Charleston and Dorchester counties, in addition to all of Beaufort, Colleton, Hampton, and Jasper counties. The incumbent was Republican Arthur Ravenel Jr., who was re-elected with 65.5% of the vote in 1990.

=== Republican primary ===
==== Candidates ====
===== Nominee =====
- Arthur Ravenel Jr., incumbent U.S. representative

=== Democratic primary ===
==== Candidates ====
===== Nominee =====
- Bill Oberst Jr., former Georgetown Chamber of Commerce executive director

=== General election ===
==== Endorsements ====
Bill Oberst Jr. (D)

Federal officials

- Paul Tsongas, former U.S. senator from Massachusetts (1979–1985)

Organizations

- Charleston Trident Association of Realtors

==== Fundraising ====
Campaign finance reports as of December 31, 1992
Candidate (party)	Total receipts	Total disbursements	Cash on hand
Arthur Ravenel Jr. (R)	$282,816	$561,793	$0
Bill Oberst Jr. (D)	$56,972	$56,902	$69
Source: Federal Election Commission

==== Results ====
South Carolina's 1st congressional district, 1992
Party	Candidate	Votes	%
Republican	Arthur Ravenel Jr. (incumbent)	121,938	66.07
Democratic	Bill Oberst Jr.	59,908	32.46
American	John R. Peeples	2,608	1.41
Write-in		95	0.05
Total votes		184,549	100.0
Republican hold			

== District 2 ==
1992 South Carolina's 2nd congressional district election
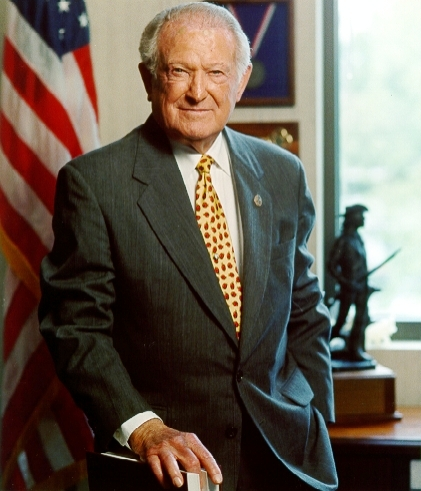

Nominee	Floyd Spence	Geb Sommer
Party	Republican	Libertarian
Popular vote	148,667	20,816
Percentage	87.6%	12.3%
U.S. representative before election
Floyd Spence
Republican
Elected U.S. representative
Floyd Spence
Republican

The 2nd district extends from the Midlands down to the Lowcountry, taking in all of Allendale, Barnwell, Hampton, Jasper, and Lexington counties, as well as parts of Aiken, Beaufort, Calhoun, Colleton, Orangeburg, and Richland counties; redistricting shifted the 2nd from a Midlands-centric seat into one which stretches along South Carolina's border with Georgia and includes a relatively large portion of the state's coastline. The incumbent was Republican Floyd Spence, who was re-elected with 88.9% of the vote in 1990.

=== Republican primary ===
==== Candidates ====
===== Nominee =====
- Floyd Spence, incumbent U.S. representative

=== General election ===
==== Endorsements ====
Geb Sommer (L)

Individuals

- Jack Gargan, founder of Throw the Hypocritical Rascals Out

Organizations

- The Coalition to End the Permanent Congress

==== Fundraising ====
Campaign finance reports as of December 31, 1992
Candidate (party)	Total receipts	Total disbursements	Cash on hand
Floyd Spence (R)	$169,036	$179,539	$51,688
Source: Federal Election Commission

==== Results ====
South Carolina's 2nd congressional district, 1992
Party	Candidate	Votes	%
Republican	Floyd Spence (incumbent)	148,667	87.62
Libertarian	Geb Sommer	20,816	12.27
Write-in		187	0.11
Total votes		169,670	100.0
Republican hold			

== District 3 ==
1992 South Carolina's 3rd congressional district election
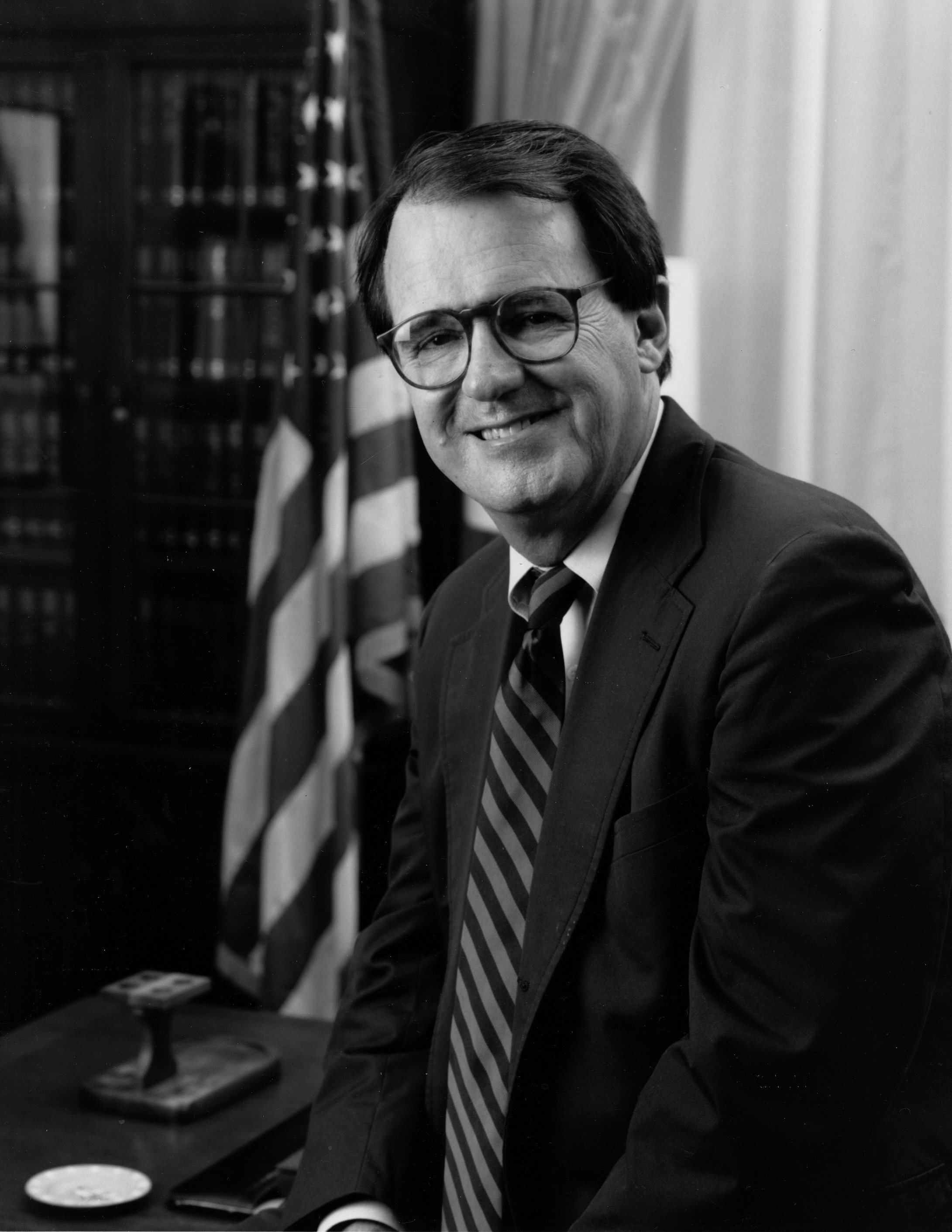

Nominee	Butler Derrick	Jim Bland
Party	Democratic	Republican
Popular vote	119,119	75,660
Percentage	61.1%	38.8%
- County results Derrick: 50–60% 60–70% 70–80%
U.S. representative before election
Butler Derrick
Democratic
Elected U.S. representative
Butler Derrick
Democratic

The 3rd district is based in both the Upstate and Midlands, encompassing all of Abbeville, Anderson, Edgefield, Greenwood, McCormick, Oconee, Pickens, and Saluda counties, and parts of Aiken and Laurens counties; following redistricting, the 3rd became much more Upstate-oriented as it lost Allendale and Barnwell counties, as well as some of Aiken County, while gaining most of Laurens County. The incumbent was Democrat Butler Derrick, who was re-elected with 62.1% of the vote of in 1990.

=== Democratic primary ===
==== Candidates ====
===== Nominee =====
- Butler Derrick, incumbent U.S. representative

=== Republican primary ===
==== Candidates ====
===== Nominee =====
- Jim Bland, Aiken County councilman

=== General election ===
==== Fundraising ====
Campaign finance reports as of December 31, 1992
Candidate (party)	Total receipts	Total disbursements	Cash on hand
Butler Derrick (D)	$681,632	$673,677	$114,145
Jim Bland (R)	$17,536	$17,339	$194
Source: Federal Election Commission

==== Results ====
South Carolina's 3rd congressional district, 1992
Party	Candidate	Votes	%
Democratic	Butler Derrick (incumbent)	119,119	61.13
Republican	Jim Bland	75,660	38.83
Write-in		85	0.04
Total votes		194,864	100.0
Democratic hold			

== District 4 ==
1992 South Carolina's 4th congressional district election
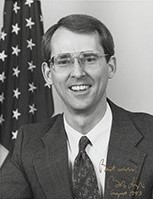

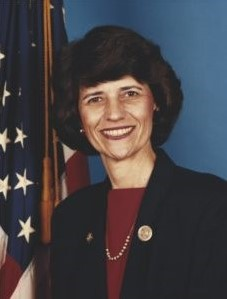
Nominee	Bob Inglis	Liz J. Patterson
Party	Republican	Democratic
Popular vote	99,879	94,182
Percentage	50.3%	47.5%
- County results Inglis: 50–60% Patterson: 50–60% 60–70%
U.S. representative before election
Liz J. Patterson
Democratic
Elected U.S. representative
Bob Inglis
Republican

The 4th District is located solely in the Upstate and includes all of Greenville, Spartanburg, and Union counties; additionally, the 4th gained parts of Laurens County in redistricting. The incumbent was Democrat Liz J. Patterson, who was re-elected with 61.4% of the vote in 1990.

=== Democratic primary ===
==== Candidates ====
===== Nominee =====
- Liz J. Patterson, incumbent U.S. representative

=== Republican primary ===
==== Candidates ====
===== Nominee =====
- Bob Inglis, lawyer

===== Eliminated in primary =====
- Jerry L. Fowler, architect
- Bill McCuen, general contractor

==== Primary results ====
Republican primary results
Party	Candidate	Votes	%
Republican	Bob Inglis	21,301	70.79
Republican	Bill McCuen	4,760	15.82
Republican	Jerry L. Fowler	4,029	13.39
Total votes		30,090	100.0

=== General election ===
==== Fundraising ====
Campaign finance reports as of December 31, 1992
Candidate (party)	Total receipts	Total disbursements	Cash on hand
Bob Inglis (R)	$226,577	$215,364	$11,214
Liz J. Patterson (D)	$409,337	$406,015	$6,052
Jo Jorgensen (L)	$9,301	$9,300	$0
Source: Federal Election Commission

==== Results ====
South Carolina's 4th congressional district, 1992
Party	Candidate	Votes	%
Republican	Bob Inglis	99,879	50.34
Democratic	Liz J. Patterson (incumbent)	94,182	47.47
Libertarian	Jo Jorgensen	4,286	2.16
Write-in		63	0.03
Total votes		198,410	100.0
Republican gain from Democratic			

== District 5 ==
1992 South Carolina's 5th congressional district election
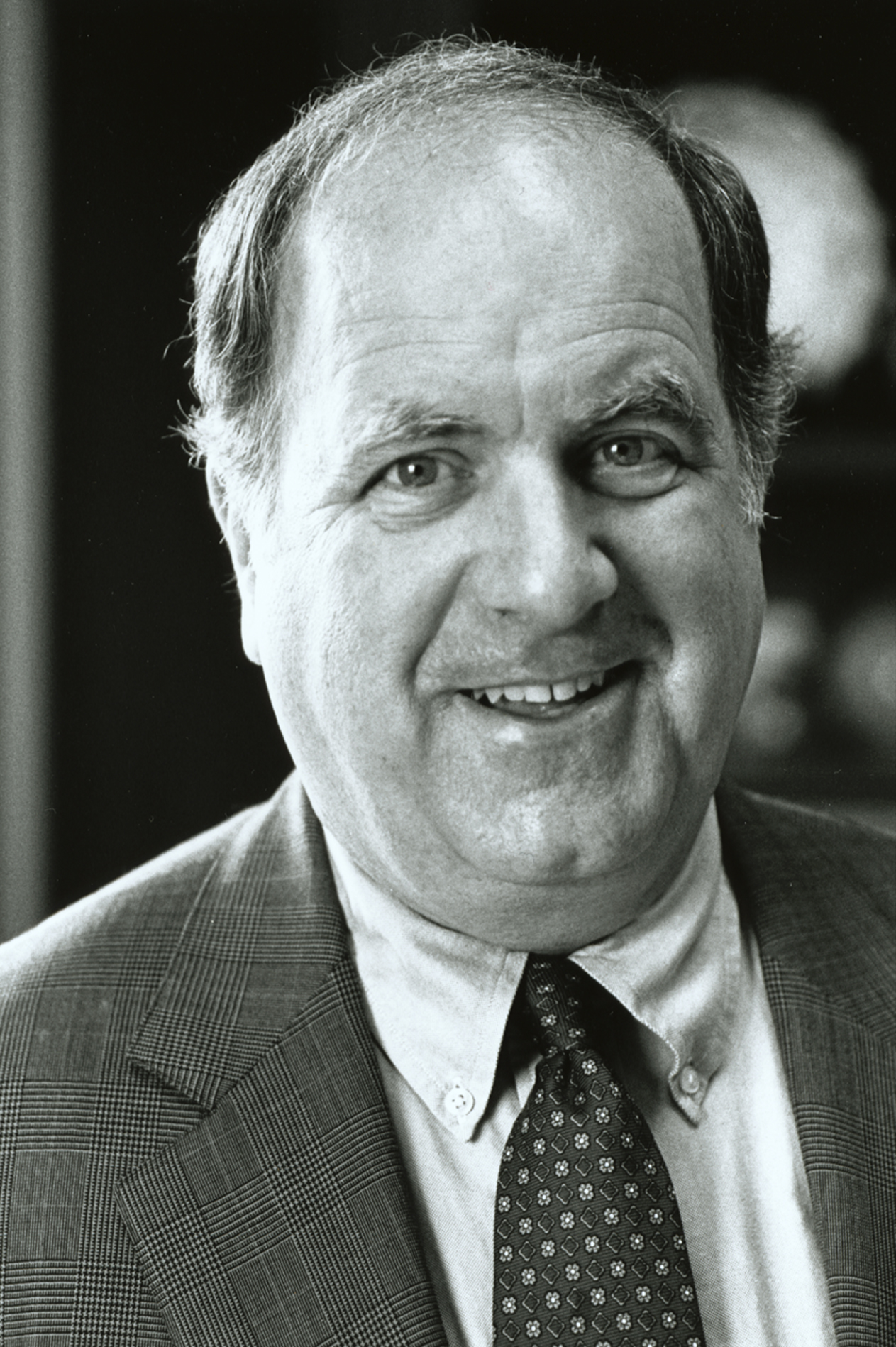

Nominee	John Spratt	Bill Horne
Party	Democratic	Republican
Popular vote	112,031	70,866
Percentage	61.2%	38.7%
- County results Spratt: 50–60% 60–70% 70–80%
U.S. representative before election
John Spratt
Democratic
Elected U.S. representative
John Spratt
Democratic

The 5th district comprises portions of the Upstate, Midlands, and Pee Dee, including all of Cherokee, Chester, Chesterfield, Dillon, Fairfield, Kershaw, Lancaster, Marlboro, Newberry, and York counties, along with parts of Darlington, Lee, and Sumter counties; the 5th was shifted away from the Upstate and towards the Pee Dee during redistricting and resulting lost Laurens County. The incumbent was Democrat John Spratt, who was re-elected unopposed in 1990.

=== Democratic primary ===
==== Candidates ====
===== Nominee =====
- John Spratt, incumbent U.S. representative

=== Republican primary ===
==== Candidates ====
===== Nominee =====
- Bill Horne, businessman and former aide to Governor Richard Riley

===== Eliminated in primary =====
- Earnest Archer, Winthrop University professor

==== Primary results ====
Republican primary results
Party	Candidate	Votes	%
Republican	Bill Horne	7,258	55.44
Republican	Earnest Archer	5,833	44.56
Total votes		13,091	100.0

=== General election ===
==== Fundraising ====
Campaign finance reports as of December 31, 1992
Candidate (party)	Total receipts	Total disbursements	Cash on hand
John Spratt (D)	$281,855	$381,942	$52,937
Bill Horne (R)	$102,751	$102,728	$22
Source: Federal Election Commission

==== Results ====
South Carolina's 5th congressional district, 1992
Party	Candidate	Votes	%
Democratic	John Spratt (incumbent)	112,031	61.19
Republican	Bill Horne	70,866	38.71
Write-in		189	0.10
Total votes		183,086	100.0
Democratic hold			

== District 6 ==
1992 South Carolina's 6th congressional district election
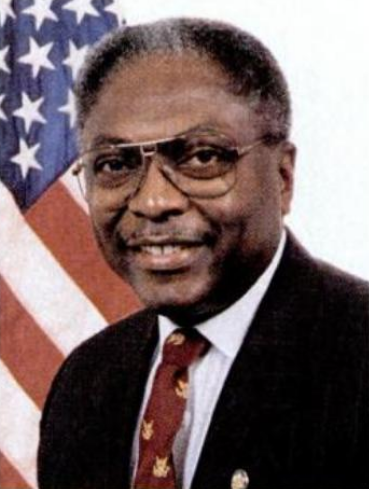

Nominee	Jim Clyburn	John Chase
Party	Democratic	Republican
Popular vote	120,647	64,149
Percentage	65.3%	34.7%
- County results Clyburn: 50–60% 60–70% 70–80% 80–90% Chase: 50–60%
U.S. representative before election
Robin Tallon
Democratic
Elected U.S. representative
Jim Clyburn
Democratic

The 6th district is centrally located and largely made up of split counties from the Pee Dee, Midlands, and Lowcountry; incorporating parts of Beaufort, Berkeley, Calhoun, Charleston, Colleton, Darlington, Dorchester, Lee, Orangeburg, Richland, and Sumter counties, it also includes all of Bamberg, Clarendon, Florence, Marion, and Williamsburg counties. During redistricting, there was bipartisan support from Republicans and black Democrats to transform the 6th into a majority-minority seat. The incumbent was Democrat Robin Tallon, who was re-elected unopposed in 1990.

=== Democratic primary ===
==== Candidates ====
===== Nominee =====
- Jim Clyburn, former state human affairs commissioner

===== Eliminated in primary =====
- Herbert Fielding, state senator
- Frank Gilbert, state senator
- John Roy Harper II, civil rights activist
- Ken Mosely, South Carolina State University professor

===== Withdrawn =====
- Robin Tallon, incumbent U.S. representative

==== Primary results ====
Democratic primary results
Party	Candidate	Votes	%
Democratic	Jim Clyburn	41,415	56.11
Democratic	Frank Gilbert	11,089	15.02
Democratic	Ken Mosely	9,494	12.86
Democratic	Herbert Fielding	9,130	12.37
Democratic	John Roy Harper II	2,680	3.63
Total votes		73,808	100.0

=== Republican primary ===
==== Candidates ====
===== Nominee =====
- John Chase, Florence city councilman

===== Eliminated in primary =====
- Delores DaCosta, former congressional aide
- Toney Graham, member of the state Department of Health and Environmental Control board

==== Primary results ====
Republican primary results
Party	Candidate	Votes	%
Republican	John Chase	5,507	57.14
Republican	Delores DaCosta	2,452	25.44
Republican	Toney Graham	1,678	17.41
Total votes		9,637	100.0

=== General election ===
==== Endorsements ====
Jim Clyburn (D)

Federal officials

- Robin Tallon, U.S. representative for South Carolina's 6th congressional district (1983–1993)

State officials

- T. Eston Marchant, South Carolina adjutant general (1979–1995)
- Thomas T. Medlock, attorney general of South Carolina (1983–1995)
- Earle Morris Jr., South Carolina comptroller general (1976–1999)
- Grady Patterson, South Carolina treasurer (1967–1995, 1999–2007)
- Nick Theodore, lieutenant governor of South Carolina (1987–1995)
Declined to endorse

State officials

- Frank Gilbert, state senator

==== Fundraising ====
Campaign finance reports as of December 31, 1992
Candidate (party)	Total receipts	Total disbursements	Cash on hand
Jim Clyburn (D)	$422,978	$422,229	$795
John Chase (R)	$115,338	$114,289	$1,048
Source: Federal Election Commission

==== Results ====
South Carolina's 6th congressional district, 1992
Party	Candidate	Votes	%
Democratic	Jim Clyburn	120,647	65.26
Republican	John Chase	64,149	34.70
Write-in		75	0.04
Total votes		184,871	100.0
Democratic hold			

== See also ==
- 1992 United States Senate election in South Carolina
- South Carolina's congressional districts
