= Read the Bill =

Read the Bill may refer to:

- Read the Bills Act
- Read the Bill, reform initiative by the Sunlight Foundation
