= Permanent Portfolio Family of Funds =

American investment company

- Type: Limited liability corporation
- Industry: investment management
- Founded: 1982
- Headquarters: San Francisco, U.S.
- Area served: USA
- Key people: Michael Cuggino
- Products: Permanent Portfolio; Short Term Treasury Portfolio; Aggressive Growth Portfolio; Versatile Bond Portfolio
- AUM: $17 billion
- Website: Official web site

Permanent Portfolio Family is an American mutual fund investment company founded in 1982. The company's products consist of four mutual funds. Its flagship fund, the Permanent Portfolio, is based on the investment strategies of Harry Browne.

== History ==
The company was established in 1982 and its first offering was a mutual fund called the Permanent Portfolio (PRPFX).

The Short-Term Treasury Portfolio (PRTBX) was founded in 1987. A stock fund called Aggressive Growth Portfolio (PAGRX) was opened in 1990 and Michael Cuggino was hired to manage it. In 1991, the company added the Versatile Bond Portfolio (PRVBX) which invests 80% or more of its net assets in bonds. Cuggino, a Certified Public Accountant took control of the Permanent Portfolio fund in 2003 when his predecessor was sanctioned by the Securities and Exchange Commission. Other company leaders include: James H. Andrews as Treasurer, Susan K. Freund as Chief Compliance Officer and Derek D. Hyatt as their Senior Investment Analyst.

== Products ==
=== Permanent Portfolio fund ===
The company's flagship fund was established in 1982 by Terry Coxan and John Chandler and "mimicked an early version of the permanent portfolio concept" of Browne. According to Kiplinger's Personal Finance magazine, the fund was designed to neutralize high inflation by investing in precious metals, Swiss bonds, U.S. Treasury bills and natural resource stocks. This was similar to Browne's strategy of a portfolio invested in equal 25% portions of bonds, stocks, cash and gold with annual re-balancing. Browne's strategy was portrayed as a "fail-safe" investment strategy designed to thrive in any economic condition, and was outlined in his 1999 book Fail-Safe Investing.

The Permanent Portfolio mutual fund, however, is more complex than Browne's original concept and has six asset categories. The fund aims to invest in a fixed percentage of asset categories with low correlation to minimize risk in changing economic climates. The target holdings for the fund include 35% in U.S. dollar bonds, both government and corporate; 10% in bonds or currency denominated in Swiss francs; 20% in gold bullion and 5% in silver bullion; 15% in growth stocks; and 15% in stocks devoted to energy, mining, real estate, and other natural resources. The fund's concept is to "preserve capital and provide low risk growth" through diversification. From 1982 through 2008, the fund's assets under management (AUM) were less than $50 million but they grew to $1 billion in 2007, $3.4 billion in 2008 and $5 billion in 2009. As of 2012 the fund had $17 billion in assets under management with 20% invested in gold bullion and a "relatively high" 0.71% annual management fee.

In the 1990s the fund had poor shareholder retention as it "badly trailed" most stock U.S. funds during a prolonged bull market. However, between Feb. 2, 2001 and February 2, 2011, a volatile period for the overall American stock market, the Permanent Portfolio fund averaged an 11 percent annualized return in comparison to a 1.6% annualized return for the S&P 500 index. When the S&P 500 index dropped 37% during the 2008 financial crisis, the Permanent Portfolio fund lost 8%. From its 1982 inception through 2010, the fund had average annual gains of 6.5% in comparison to the S&P 500 stock index's 10.6% average annual gain over the same period. In 2016, Cuggino stressed how outperforming the S&P 500 was not the fund's goal, as the Permanent Portfolio fund has dramatically different holdings and strategy with the core goal of capital growth that beats the rate of inflation. Writing for Marketwatch in 2016, Philip Van Doorn noted how Morningstar, Inc. classified the fund under the "moderate risk total return" category, not a stock-only category like the S&P 500.

The 2012 book The Permanent Portfolio: Harry Browne's Long-Term Investment Strategy discusses the fund's benefits and limitations. The authors say that the fund manager's investment decisions and the costs associated with an actively managed mutual fund are a downside when compared to an index fund, but points out that the fund's management fee of 0.78% per year is below the mutual fund average. According to a 2006 article in Kiplinger's personal finance magazine the fund has delivered on its goal of "long term stability with occasional market beating returns."

=== Aggressive Growth Portfolio ===
The Aggressive Growth Portfolio (PAGRX) is described as a "diversified, multi-cap core, U.S. equity fund" with the goal of long term appreciation. In 2002 it had $24 million in assets under management and consisted of large and mid-sized companies. In the ten years prior to March 2002 it ranked #34 amongst 797 other diversified mutual funds and had a stock management turnover rate of 6%. During that period it never had a negative year and its average annual gain was 2% better than the S&P 500 Index. In 2002 its annual management fee was 1.29%.

=== Other ===
The company also offers a Short-Term Treasury Portfolio (PRTBX) which it describes as a short-term U.S. Treasury bonds fund. The firm's Versatile Bond Portfolio (PRVBX) is said to invest 80% or more of its net assets in bonds, with wide discretion as to credit quality, duration and other factors.

== See also ==
Fail-Safe Investing
