= Jim Babka =

American writer, activist (born 1968)

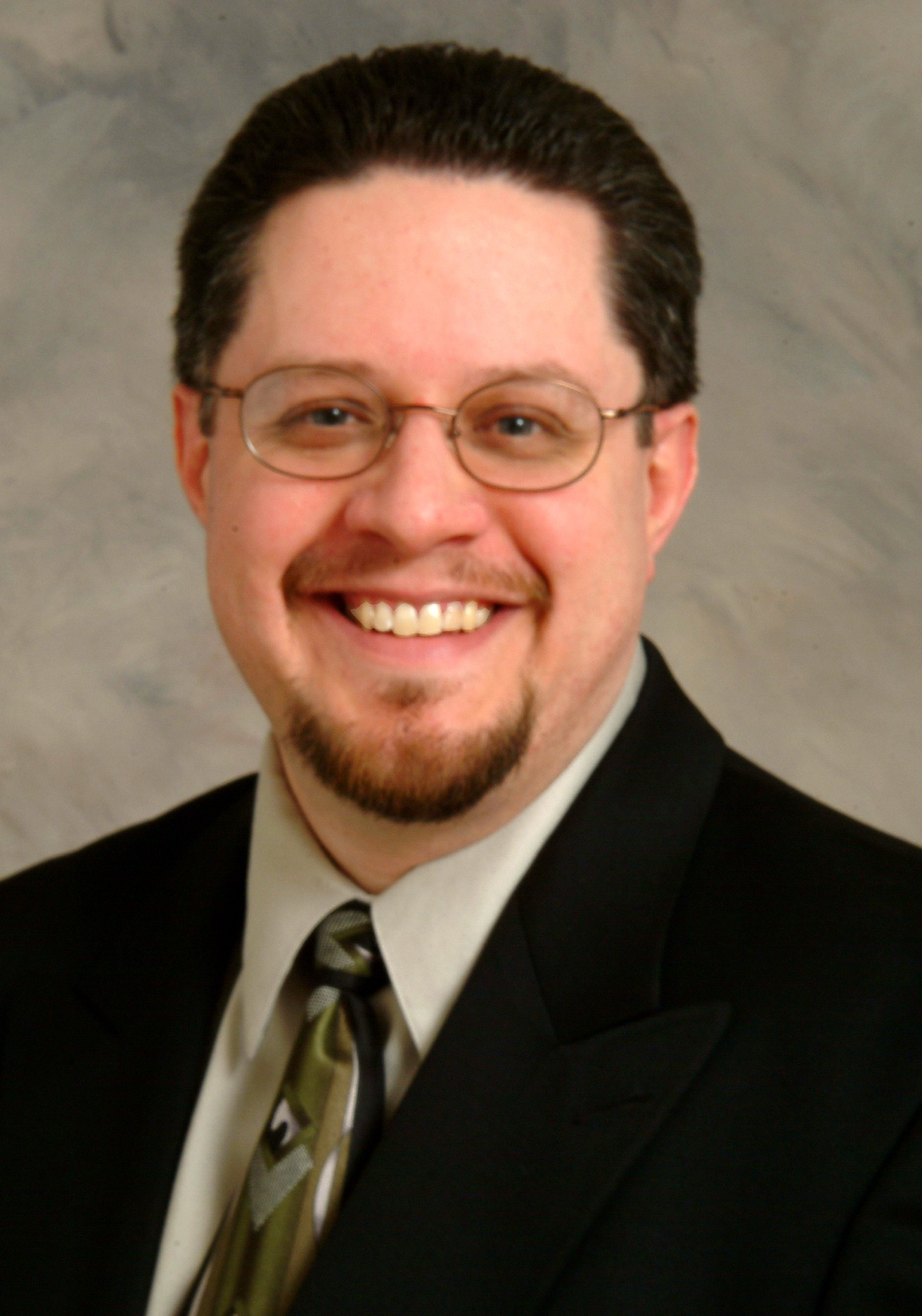
- Babka in 2004
- Born: March 14, 1968 (age 58)
- Occupations: Writer; activist
- Title: President, Downsize DC Foundation
- Spouse: Susanne
- Children: 3

Jim Babka (born 1968) is an American writer, activist, former radio talk-show host, and president of the Downsize DC Foundation.

== Early life and education ==
Babka was born in Cleveland, Ohio in 1968 to James Sr. and Joyce Babka. He was raised in Twinsburg Ohio. His mother died in a car accident in May 1978. He attended the University of Akron where he majored in political science and minored in business management.

== Professional activist ==
Babka was the press secretary for Libertarian Party presidential candidate Harry Browne in 2000. He also worked as a paid consultant for Libertarian Bill Redpath in his run for Virginia Governor in 2001.

Babka was named the President of RealCampaignReform.org, a project to oppose the McCain-Feingold campaign finance reform, which ultimately passed as the Bipartisan Campaign Reform Act of 2002. Immediately, Babka went to work with his attorneys to organize a group of plaintiffs to challenge the law. Congressman Ron Paul was the lead plaintiff, making their case, Paul v. FEC. RealCampaignReform.org was joined by Gun Owners of America, Citizens United, Massachusetts candidates Carla Howell and Michael Cloud, and others.

Babka wrote a column published at WorldNetDaily called, "The Deliciously Absurd Plan of the NRA," and was invited on to National Public Radio to talk about it.

Babka is the co-creator of a “post-statist” educational initiative called the Zero Aggression Project, demonstrating how politics violates the Zero Aggression Principle. In this role, he co-authored the Political Conscience Test.

As of June 2021, Babka is Executive Editor of the Advocates for Self-Government. He is the President of DownsizeDC.org, Inc., a group organized to pressure Congress in a libertarian direction. This includes the creation of Read the Bills Act, One Subject at a Time Act, and Write the Laws Act. Jim is also a Colleague at the Foundation for Harmony & Prosperity.
