= Fail-Safe Investing =

Book by Harry Browne

Fail-Safe Investing: Lifelong Financial Security in 30 Minutes
- Author: Harry Browne
- Language: English
- Subject: Personal finance
- Genre: Non-fiction
- Publication date: September 1999
- Publication place: United States

Fail-Safe Investing: Lifelong Financial Security in 30 Minutes is a personal finance book written by American investment analyst and politician Harry Browne and published in September 1999.

== Description ==
The book outlines "17 simple rules of financial safety" and provides detailed commentary on their explanation and implementation. The chapter for Rule #11 is called "Build a Bullet Proof Portfolio for Protection" and makes a case for a diversified investment portfolio of stocks, bonds, cash and gold to ensure financial safety. According to the author this type of portfolio has the goal of assuring "that you are financially safe, no matter what the future brings" including economic prosperity, inflation, recession or deflation. According to the book this is because some portion of the portfolio will perform favorably during each of those economic cycles. The book calls this type of investment portfolio, a "permanent portfolio" and advocates it be re-balanced once per year so that the 25% allocation is precisely maintained for each asset class. The breakdown is as follows

Permanent Portfolio Asset Classes
1. Stocks (25.0%)
2. Long-term Bonds (25.0%)
3. Cash (25.0%)
4. Gold (25.0%)
- 25% in U.S. stocks, to provide a strong return during times of prosperity. For this portion of the portfolio, Browne recommends a basic S&P 500 index fund such as VFINX (closed to new investors since publication, replaced by VFIAX, which is also Vanguard 500 Index fund) or FSMKX (Fidelity Spartan 500 Index).
- 25% in long-term U.S. Treasury bonds, which do well during prosperity and during deflation (but which do poorly during other economic cycles).
- 25% in cash in order to hedge against periods of “tight money” or recession. In this case, “cash” means U.S. Treasury bills.
- 25% in precious metals (gold) in order to provide protection during periods of inflation. Browne recommends gold bullion coins.

According to Browne such a permanent portfolio should be safe, simple and stable. Authors Craig Rowland and J. M. Lawson call it a passive style of investing.

== Reception ==
The concept of a permanent portfolio, as described in the book, has received significant attention and discussion in the financial community. The book has popularized this portfolio strategy for individual investors whose goal is to safeguard their investments during changing economic conditions. Advocates have cited the strategy's "solid performance" during the first decade of the 21st century including the period of the 2008 financial crisis as an indication that the strategy is beneficial. Author Mark Tier, called it a "well-thought-out investment strategy that successfully applies diversification to the aim of not just preserving capital, but increasing that capital's purchasing power over time". The book has been described as "long on theory but short on actual details" for implementation of its investment philosophy.

Critics questioned its ability to outperform the S&P 500 index in a future era of rising interest rates. They have pointed out that since its inception in 1982 the Permanent Fund Portfolio mutual fund, which utilizes the permanent portfolio principles outlined in the book, has had inferior performance when compared to the S&P 500.

== See also ==
- Permanent Portfolio Family of Funds
