= Bob Inglis =

American politician (born 1959)

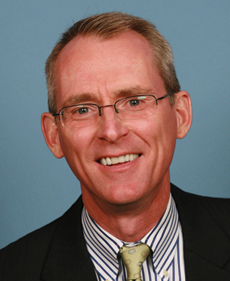
- Official portrait, 2008

Member of the U.S. House of Representatives from South Carolina's 4th district
- In office January 3, 2005 – January 3, 2011
- Preceded by: Jim DeMint
- Succeeded by: Trey Gowdy
- In office January 3, 1993 – January 3, 1999
- Preceded by: Liz Patterson
- Succeeded by: Jim DeMint

Personal details
- Born: Robert Durden Inglis; October 11, 1959 (age 67) Savannah, Georgia, U.S.
- Party: Republican
- Spouse: Mary Anne Inglis
- Education: Duke University (BA); University of Virginia (JD)

Robert Durden Inglis Sr. (born October 11, 1959) is an American politician who was the U.S. representative for South Carolina's 4th congressional district from 1993 to 1999 and again from 2005 to 2011. He is member of the Republican Party.

Inglis was first elected to Congress in 1992, serving three terms before running for U.S. Senate in 1998, losing to Democrat Fritz Hollings in the general election. He returned to the House after being re-elected in 2004. A moderate Republican and critic of the Tea Party movement, Inglis lost renomination to Trey Gowdy in a landslide in 2010, garnering 29.3% of the vote.

In 2012, Inglis launched the Energy and Enterprise Initiative, a nationwide public engagement campaign based in George Mason University in Fairfax, Virginia, which promotes conservative and free-enterprise solutions to energy and climate challenges. He accepts the scientific consensus on climate change and supports market-based solutions like a revenue-neutral carbon tax, to be paid for by a reduction in income and payroll taxes. Inglis is also executive director of republicEN, a group of conservatives promoting free market fixes to climate change.

== Early life, education, and law career ==
Inglis was born in Savannah, Georgia, the son of Helen Louise (née McCullough) and Allick Wyllie Inglis Jr. His ancestry is Scottish and English. He grew up in Bluffton, South Carolina, near Hilton Head Island. He earned his undergraduate degree from Duke University in Durham, North Carolina. He obtained his Juris Doctor from the University of Virginia School of Law in Charlottesville, Virginia. Upon his graduation from law school, he worked for a number of years as a lawyer in private practice, and served on the executive committee of the Greenville County Republican Party.

== U.S. House of Representatives ==
=== Elections ===
==== 1992 ====
Inglis made his first run for elected office when he won the Republican nomination for the 4th District. In the general election, he defeated three-term incumbent Democrat Liz J. Patterson, who had earlier defeated Bill Workman and Knox H. White, two Republicans who were successive mayors of Greenville, with White still in the position. In this election, incumbent President George H. W. Bush carried the state with 48% of the vote, although he lost nationally, and South Carolina's majority of voters made it one of the strongest Republican-voting states. Although the 4th District had been trending Republican for some time, Patterson had deep family ties in the district as the daughter of the late, longtime U.S. Senator Olin D. Johnston. Additionally, she had won her first three terms under unfriendly conditions for Democrats.

==== 1994–1996 ====
Proving just how Republican this district had become, Inglis was re-elected in 1994 and 1996 with no substantive opposition, both times winning more than 70 percent of the vote.

==== 1998 ====
1998 Senate election results by county Inglis: 40–50%; 50–60%; 60–70%; Johnson: 40–50%; 50–60%; 60–70%; 70–80%

Inglis had promised during his initial bid for the seat to serve only three terms. Accordingly, he vacated the seat in 1998 to run for the Senate against Democratic incumbent Ernest Hollings, who had been in office since 1966, as successor to Olin Johnston. Inglis gave Hollings his third close race in a row, holding the longtime Senator to 53 percent of the vote. After losing the race, Inglis returned to work as a lawyer, practicing commercial real estate and corporate law. He was succeeded in the House by Jim DeMint, who had been an informal adviser to Inglis.

==== 2004 ====
In 2004, DeMint opted to run for Hollings's open Senate seat instead of seeking re-election to the House. Inglis chose to try for his old House seat. He easily won a three-way Republican primary with 85 percent of the vote, all but assuring his return to Congress. He faced the founder of the HBCU Classic and first African American Democratic candidate to run for the 4th District seat, Brandon P. Brown from Taylors, in the general election. Inglis was re-elected with little difficulty in 2006 and 2008.

==== 2010 ====
2010 GOP primary results by precinct: Inglis: 20–30%; 30–40%; 40–50%; 50–60%; 70–80%; Gowdy: 20–30%; 30–40%; 40–50%; 50–60%; 60–70%; 70–80%; 80–90%; Thomas: 20–30%; 30–40%; 40–50%; 50–60%; Lee: 20–30%; 30–40%; Tie

2010 GOP primary runoff results by precinct: Inglis: 50–60%; Gowdy: 50–60%; 60–70%; 70–80%; 80–90%; 90–100%; Tie

Inglis faced four challengers in the Republican primary—the real contest in this heavily Republican district. It was the first time he faced substantive primary opposition as an incumbent. The challengers included 7th Circuit (Spartanburg) Solicitor Trey Gowdy, state Senator David L. Thomas, college professor and former Historian of the U.S. House Christina Jeffrey, and businessman Jim Lee.

In the June 8, 2010, primary election, Inglis finished second with 27 percent of the vote, well behind first-place finisher Gowdy's 39 percent. Inglis was forced into a June 22 run-off election against Gowdy. Although he had "racked up a reliably conservative record" during his six terms in the House, Inglis had been criticized by his primary opponents for certain votes, including his support for the Emergency Economic Stabilization Act of 2008 (which earned him the nickname "Bailout Bob") and his opposition to the Iraq War troop surge of 2007, and was portrayed as removed from the interests of the district. Inglis had attacked Gowdy's conservatism and questioned his opponent's support for creating a costly lake in Union County, South Carolina.

In the runoff, Gowdy defeated Inglis in a landslide, 71–29 percent. Following his defeat in the Republican primary, Inglis criticized the Tea Party movement, which had supported his opponent's campaign, as well as the Republican Party for courting the movement, stating, "It's a dangerous strategy, to build conservatism on information and policies that are not credible."

=== Tenure ===
Inglis's 2010 Republican primary opponents asserted that his voting record in his second House tenure was more moderate than his first. He was one of seventeen House Republicans who voted for a Democratic resolution opposing the Iraq War troop surge of 2007, and spoke against climate change denial, offshore oil drilling and warrantless surveillance after his return to the House. In response, Inglis pointed to his 93.5% lifetime rating from the American Conservative Union and his endorsements from the NRA Political Victory Fund and National Right to Life Committee. He touts his conservative credentials: "Ninety-three American Conservative Union lifetime rating, 100% Christian Coalition, 100% National Right to Life, A with the NRA, zero with the Americans for Democratic Action, the liberal group, and 23, by some mistake, with the AFL-CIO, the labor union - I was really hoping for a zero."

On climate change, Inglis said that conservatives should go with the facts and the science, and accept the National Academy of Sciences' conclusion that climate change is caused by human activities and poses significant risks, which 97 percent of climate scientists agree with. He proposes eliminating all energy subsidies and replacing income and payroll taxes with a revenue neutral carbon tax. In 2009, he introduced the Raise Wages, Cut Carbon Act.

Inglis is a staunch advocate of a federal prohibition of online poker. He also supported actions to aid people in war-torn Darfur. In 2006, he co-sponsored H.R. 4411, the Goodlatte-Leach Internet Gambling Prohibition Act and H.R. 4777, the Internet Gambling Prohibition Act.

In October 2007, before the South Carolina 2008 Republican presidential primary, Inglis told presidential candidate Mitt Romney, a Mormon, "[Y]ou cannot equate Mormonism with Christianity; you cannot say, 'I am a Christian just like you.'" Inglis stated "If he [Romney] does that, every Baptist preacher in the South is going to have to go to the pulpit on Sunday and explain the differences."

On September 15, 2009, Inglis was one of seven Republicans to cross party lines in voting to disapprove fellow South Carolina Republican Joe Wilson for a lack of decorum during President Obama's address to a joint session of Congress. He was one of eight House Republicans to support the DREAM Act.

=== Committee assignments ===
In the 111th Congress:

- Committee on Foreign Affairs
  - Subcommittee on Asia, the Pacific, and the Global Environment
  - Subcommittee on Europe
  - Subcommittee on the Middle East and South Asia
- Committee on Science and Technology
  - Subcommittee on Energy and Environment (Ranking Member)
  - Science Subcommittee on Research and Science Education

== Views on climate change ==
On December 27, 2008, Inglis and Art Laffer coauthored an op-ed in The New York Times in support of a revenue neutral carbon tax: "We need to impose a tax on the thing we want less of (carbon dioxide) and reduce taxes on the things we want more of (income and jobs). A carbon tax would attach the national security and environmental costs to carbon-based fuels like oil, causing the market to recognize the price of these negative externalities." He made the case in a Bloomberg Businessweek op-ed, noting that "small particulates from coal-fired plants cause 23,600 premature deaths in the U.S. annually, 21,850 hospital admissions, 26,000 emergency room visits for asthma, 38,200 heart attacks that are not fatal, and 3,186,000 lost work days". He writes:

conservatives know that there’s no such thing as a free lunch, we know that we’re paying for those deaths and illnesses. We pay for them through government programs for the poor and elderly, and when the costs of the uninsured are shifted onto the insured. We pay all right, but just not at the electric meter.

We pay the full cost of petroleum in hidden ways, too. We pay to protect the supply lines coming out of the Middle East through the blood of the country’s best and though the treasure that comes from our taxes or, worse, from deficit financing. We pay in the risk to our national security. We pay the cost of lung impairments when the small-particulate pollution comes from tailpipes just like we pay when the small particulates come from power plants. We just don’t pay at the pump.

What if we attached all of the costs -- especially the hidden costs -- to all fuels? What if we believed in accountability? What if we believed in the power of free markets?

He "figures prominently" in the 2014 Merchants of Doubt documentary as an interviewee exposing the methods of science deniers. He also appears in the documentary series Years of Living Dangerously.

He made the case in a TED talk: "We want to insist that polluters pay. They pay for these emissions, and the marginal harm they are causing for that last ton of CO2." He proposes ending energy subsidies, including "the biggest subsidy of all: the ability to belch and burn for free without accountability."

== Opposition to Donald Trump ==
In October 2016, Inglis was one of thirty GOP ex-lawmakers to sign a public letter condemning Republican presidential candidate Donald Trump. He had previously said, in a May 2016 interview with Chris Hayes, that "under no circumstances" could he vote for Trump. Commenting on Trump's campaign after the election, Inglis said: "It's one thing to represent people and give a voice to their fears. It is quite another to amplify those fears—that is surely the worst possible kind of leadership. It's demagoguery. The real sadness for me is that we knew it, and yet we voted for it. In a very real sense, the whole country has lost this election."

Six months later, after House Speaker Paul Ryan accused Democrats of partisan bias in calling for Trump's impeachment over the firing of FBI director James Comey, then investigating possible links between Trump's campaign and Russia, Inglis chastised Ryan on Twitter, saying, "you know this isn't true" since Republicans would have had, in his opinion, ample grounds for considering impeachment if a Democratic president had done the things Trump was accused of. Reminded that he had, as a member of the House Judiciary Committee, voted to impeach President Bill Clinton in 1998, he said that was "for matters less serious than the ones before us now."

In 2024, Inglis endorsed Kamala Harris over Trump in the presidential election. According to him, if Harris wins, it would be great for the Republican Party, restoring its rationality to be the credible free enterprise, small government party again.

== Awards and honors ==
Inglis was the recipient of the 2015 Profile in Courage Award from the John F. Kennedy Library Foundation "for the courage he demonstrated when reversing his position on climate change after extensive briefings with scientists, and discussions with his children, about the impact of atmospheric warming on our future."

== Personal life ==
Inglis and his wife Mary Anne have five grown children, and they live on a small farm near Travelers Rest, north of Greenville. He is a member of St. John in the Wilderness, an Episcopal congregation in Flat Rock, NC. In 2015, he signed an amicus brief calling for the recognition of same-sex marriage.

On October 2, 2023, Inglis wrote an op-ed in the New York Times urging his fellow Republicans to consider the long range consequences of their votes, and arguing that when they "grow up" and look back on their careers they will ask themselves "Was I an agent of chaos in a house divided, or did I work to bring America together, healing rifts and bridging divides?"

== Electoral history ==
South Carolina's 4th congressional district, 1992
Party	Candidate	Votes	%
Republican	Bob Inglis	99,879	50.3
Democratic	Elizabeth J. Patterson	94,182	47.5
Libertarian	Jo Jorgensen	4,286	2.2
Independent	Write-in candidates	63	0.0
Total votes		198,410	100.0

South Carolina's 4th congressional district, 1994
Party	Candidate	Votes	%
Republican	Bob Inglis	109,626	73.5
Democratic	Jerry L. Fowler	39,396	26.1
Independent	Write-in candidates	154	0.1
Total votes		149,176	100.0

South Carolina's 4th congressional district, 1996
Party	Candidate	Votes	%
Republican	Bob Inglis	138,165	70.9
Democratic	Darrell E. Curry	54,126	27.8
Natural Law	C. Faye Walters	2,501	1.3
Total votes		194,792	100.0

United States Senate election in South Carolina, 1998 – Republican primary
Party	Candidate	Votes	%
Republican	Bob Inglis	115,029	74.6
Republican	Stephen Brown	33,530	21.8
Republican	Elton Legrand	5,634	3.7
Total votes		154,193	100.0

United States Senate election in South Carolina, 1998
Party	Candidate	Votes	%
Democratic	Ernest Hollings	563,377	52.7
Republican	Bob Inglis	488,238	45.7
Libertarian	Richard T. Quillian	16,991	1.6
Independent	Write-in candidates	457	0.0
Total votes		1,069,063	100.0

South Carolina's 4th congressional district, 2004
Party	Candidate	Votes	%
Republican	Bob Inglis	188,795	69.8
Democratic	Brandon P. Brown	78,376	29.0
Green	C. Faye Walters	3,273	1.2
Independent	Write-in candidates	150	0.1
Total votes		270,594	100.0

South Carolina's 4th congressional district, 2006
Party	Candidate	Votes	%
Republican	Bob Inglis	115,553	64.2
Democratic	William Griff Griffith	57,490	32.0
Libertarian	John Cobin	4,467	2.5
Green	C. Faye Walters	2,336	1.3
Independent	Write-in candidates	85	0.1
Total votes		179,931	100.0

South Carolina's 4th congressional district, 2008 – Republican primary
Party	Candidate	Votes	%
Republican	Bob Inglis	37,571	67.0
Republican	Charles Jeter	18,545	33.1
Total votes		56,116	100.0

South Carolina's 4th congressional district, 2008
Party	Candidate	Votes	%
Republican	Bob Inglis	184,440	60.1
Democratic	Paul Corden	113,291	36.9
Green	C. Faye Walters	7,332	2.4
Independent	Write-in candidates	1,865	0.6
Total votes		306,928	100.0

South Carolina's 4th congressional district, 2010 – Republican primary
Party	Candidate	Votes	%
Republican	Trey Gowdy	34,103	39.2
Republican	Bob Inglis	23,877	27.5
Republican	Jim Lee	11,854	13.6
Republican	David L. Thomas	11,073	12.7
Republican	Christina Jeffrey	6,041	7.0
Total votes		86,948	100.0

South Carolina's 4th congressional district, 2010 – Republican primary runoff
Party	Candidate	Votes	%
Republican	Trey Gowdy	54,412	70.7
Republican	Bob Inglis	22,590	29.3
Total votes		77,002	100.0

U.S. House of Representatives
Preceded by Liz Patterson	Member of the U.S. House of Representatives from South Carolina's 4th congressional district 1993–1999	Succeeded by Jim DeMint
Preceded by Jim DeMint	Member of the U.S. House of Representatives from South Carolina's 4th congressional district 2005–2011	Succeeded by Trey Gowdy
Party political offices
Preceded by Thomas F. Hartnett	Republican nominee for U.S. Senator from South Carolina (Class 3); 1998	Succeeded by Jim DeMint
U.S. order of precedence (ceremonial)
Preceded by Niki Tsongas as Former U.S. Representative	Order of precedence of the United States as Former U.S. Representative	Succeeded by Annie Kuster as Former U.S. Representative
