= 1998 United States Senate election in South Carolina =

- November 3, 1998
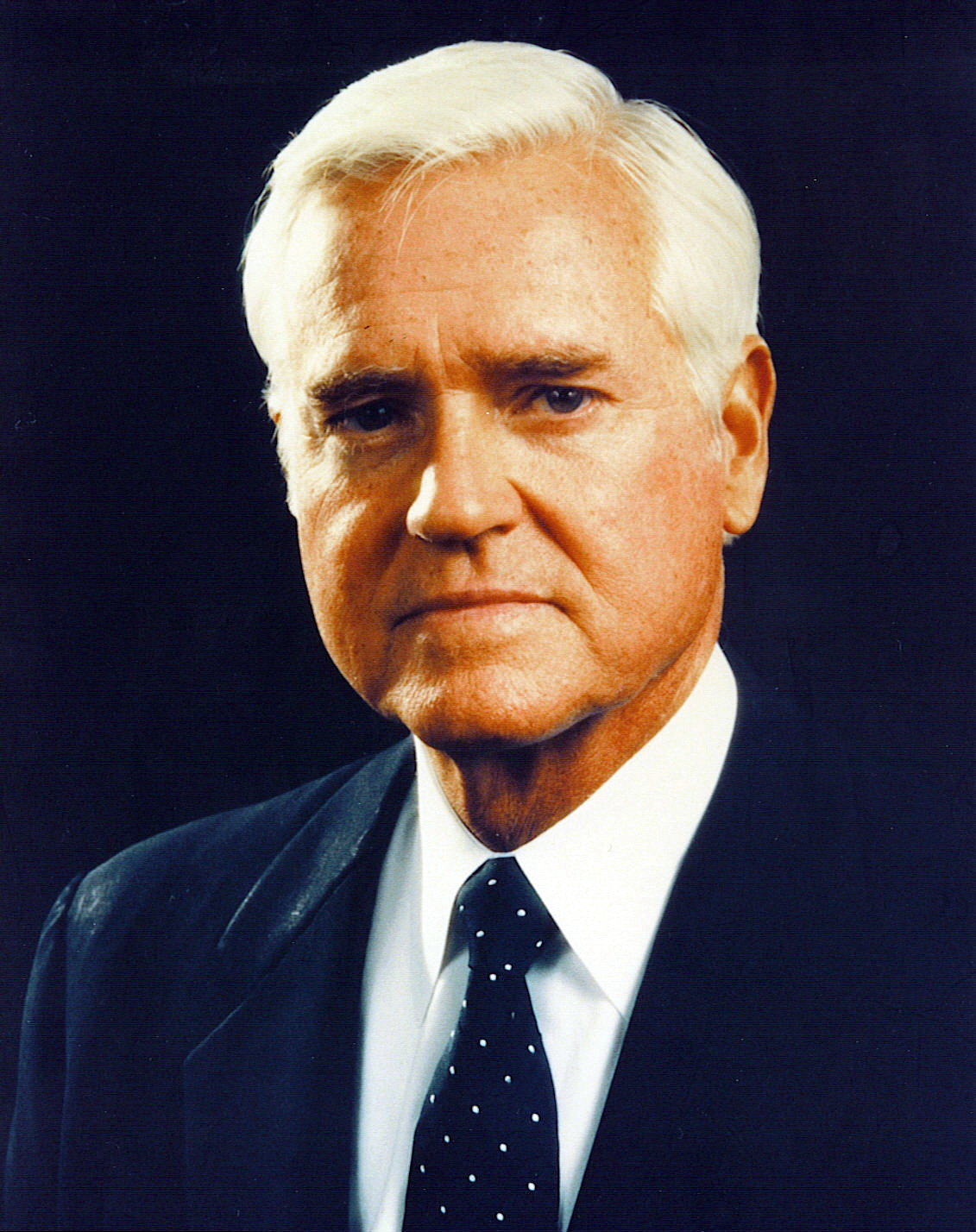

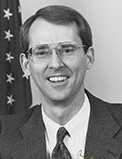
Nominee	Fritz Hollings	Bob Inglis
Party	Democratic	Republican
Popular vote	562,791	488,132
Percentage	52.70%	45.67%
- County results Hollings: 40–50% 50–60% 60–70% 70–80% Inglis: 40–50% 50–60% 60–70%
U.S. senator before election
Ernest Hollings
Democratic
Elected U.S. Senator
Ernest Hollings
Democratic

The 1998 United States Senate election in South Carolina was held November 3, 1998. Democratic incumbent Fritz Hollings won reelection to his seventh term in office over Republican congressman Bob Inglis. This was also the last time a Democrat was elected to either Senate seat from South Carolina until 2026.

== Republican primary ==
=== Candidates ===
- Stephen Brown, chair of the Greenville County Republican Party
- Bob Inglis, U.S. representative from Greenville
- Elton Legrand

=== Results ===
1998 U.S. Senate Republican primary
Party	Candidate	Votes	%
Republican	Bob Inglis	115,029	74.6%
Republican	Stephen Brown	33,530	21.7%
Republican	Elton Legrand	5,634	3.7%

== General election ==
=== Candidates ===
- Fritz Hollings, incumbent U.S. senator since 1966 (Democratic)
- Bob Inglis, U.S. representative from Greenville (Republican)
- Richard T. Quillian (Libertarian)

=== Campaign ===
The race between Hollings and Inglis gave the voters a choice of two very different visions of and for South Carolina. Hollings was from the Lowcountry, a face of the Old New South, and secured a large amount of federal funds for the state. On the other hand, Inglis came from the Upstate, was a face of the New New South, and opposed to pork barrel spending. Hollings viciously attacked Inglis on the campaign trail as a "goddamn skunk" and when Inglis requested that Hollings sign a pledge for campaign courtesy, Hollings replied that Inglis could "kiss his fanny." Inglis tried to tie Hollings to President Clinton, who had been tainted by the Lewinsky scandal.

Ultimately, Hollings won the race for four crucial reasons. First, Inglis refused to accept PAC donations which allowed Hollings to enjoy a huge financial advantage and blanket the state with his television advertisements. Secondly, Inglis came from the Upstate which already provided GOP majorities whereas Hollings came from the Lowcountry which was a key tossup region in the state. Thirdly, the voters two years prior in the 1996 Senate election had rewarded Strom Thurmond for his long service to the state and it was unlikely that they would then deny re-election to Hollings. Finally, the 1998 South Carolina GOP ticket was dragged down with unpopular Governor David Beasley at the top of the ticket who would go on to lose his re-election campaign to Jim Hodges.

Polling

Poll source	Date(s)	Sample size	Fritz Hollings (D)	Bob Inglis (R)	Other / undecided (Note: Calculated by taking the difference of 100% and all other candidates combined.)
North Star Opinion Research/Ayres, McHenry & Associates (R) (Note: Poll conducted for Bob Inglis.)	October 28, 1998	600 (Note: Average of multiple versions or turnout models listed in the poll.)	43.5%	43.5%	13%
Mason-Dixon Polling & Strategy	October 27, 1998	806	49%	44%	7%
Mason-Dixon Polling & Strategy	September 1998	?	49%	42%	9%
Mason-Dixon Polling & Strategy	August 1998	?	48%	40%	12%
Mason-Dixon Polling & Strategy	June 1998	?	47%	42%	21%
Whit Ayres	April 1998	?	42%	42%	16%

=== Results ===
South Carolina U.S. Senate Election, 1998
Party	Candidate	Votes	%	±%
Democratic	Fritz Hollings (Incumbent)	563,377	52.70%	+2.6%
Republican	Bob Inglis	488,238	45.67%	−1.2%
Libertarian	Richard T. Quillian	16,991	1.59%	−0.3%
No party	Write-Ins	457	0.04%	−0.1%
Majority		75,139	7.03%	+3.8%
Turnout		1,069,063	52.8%	
Democratic hold				

== See also ==
- List of United States senators from South Carolina
- 1998 United States Senate elections
- 1998 South Carolina gubernatorial election
