= Downsize DC Foundation =

Public education non-profit

Coordinates: 41.125°N 81.551°W

The Downsize DC Foundation, formerly known as the American Liberty Foundation, is a non-partisan policy advocacy organization which aims to limit the size of government in the United States through awareness and petitioning. It was founded by two-time Libertarian presidential candidate Harry Browne, his former campaign staff members Perry Willis and Jim Babka, and former National Chair of the Libertarian Party Steve Dasbach.

The chair of the Downsize DC Foundation is Jim Babka. Gary Nolan (Chair) and Rick Wiggins also serve on the Board of Directors.

DownsizeDC.org supports legislation that reduces the size of the federal government and opposes legislation that enlarges the government. One bill the organization has proposed is the Read Bills Act which would require bills to be publicly posted at least 72 hours prior to Congress formally taking up those bills for consideration. The legislation has been introduced by Senator Rand Paul (R-KY). The organization has also proposed the One Subject at a Time Act which would require every bill to only pertain to one subject rather than containing unrelated pork.

The organization has also submitted amicus briefs arguing against government surveillance and warrantless searches of devices.
