= 2004 United States House of Representatives elections in South Carolina =

- November 2, 2004

All 6 South Carolina seats to the United States House of Representatives
	Majority party	Minority party
Party	Republican	Democratic
Last election	4	2
Seats won	4	2
Seat change	Steady	Steady
Popular vote	913,168	486,479
Percentage	63.45%	33.80%
Swing	▲5.62%	▼1.24%

Republican
50–60%
60–70%
70–80%
80–90%
>90%
Democratic
50–60%
60–70%
70–80%
80–90%
Winners
Republican Hold
Democratic Hold

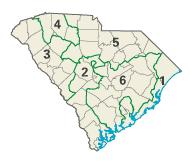
South Carolina's 6 congressional districts

The 2004 United States House of Representatives elections in South Carolina were held on November 2, 2004, to select six Representatives for two-year terms from the state of South Carolina. The primary elections for the Democrats and the Republicans were held on June 8. All five incumbents who ran were re-elected and the open seat in the 4th congressional district was retained by the Republicans. The composition of the state delegation remained four Republicans and two Democrats.

== Overview ==
United States House of Representatives elections in South Carolina, 2004
Party	Votes	Percentage	Seats	+/–
Republican	913,168	63.45%	4	—
Democratic	486,479	33.80%	2	—
Green	28,947	2.01%	0	—
Independents	10,524	0.73%	0	—
Totals	1,439,118	100.00%	6	—

== District 1 ==
2004 South Carolina's 1st congressional district election
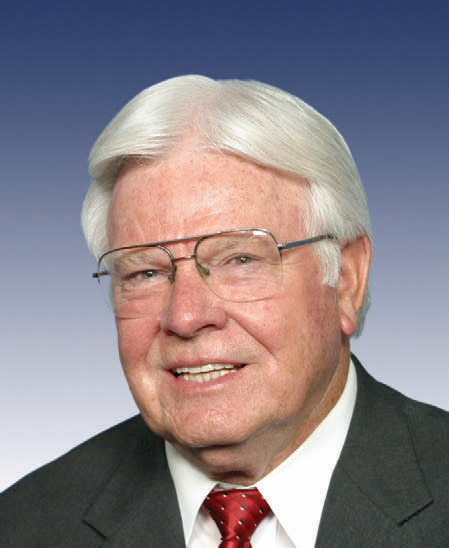

Nominee	Henry E. Brown, Jr.	James E. Dunn
Party	Republican	Green
Popular vote	186,448	25,674
Percentage	87.8%	12.1%
- County results Brown: 80–90%
U.S. Representative before election
Henry E. Brown, Jr. (inc.)
Republican
Elected U.S. Representative
Henry E. Brown, Jr.
Republican

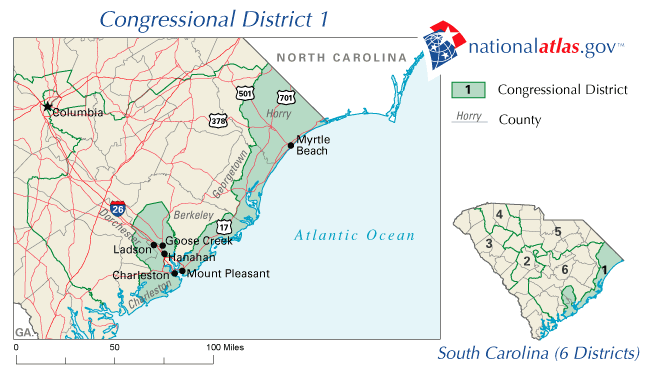

Seeking his third term in this conservative, coastal South Carolina-based district, incumbent Republican Congressman Henry E. Brown, Jr. crushed Green Party candidate James Dunn to win another term.

=== Predictions ===
Source	Ranking	As of
The Cook Political Report	Safe R	October 29, 2004
Sabato's Crystal Ball	Safe R	November 1, 2004

=== Results ===
South Carolina's 1st congressional district election, 2004
Party	Candidate	Votes	%
Republican	Henry E. Brown, Jr. (inc.)	186,448	87.82
Green	James E. Dunn	25,674	12.09
Write-ins		186	0.09
Total votes		212,308	100.00
Republican hold			

== District 2 ==
2004 South Carolina's 2nd congressional district election
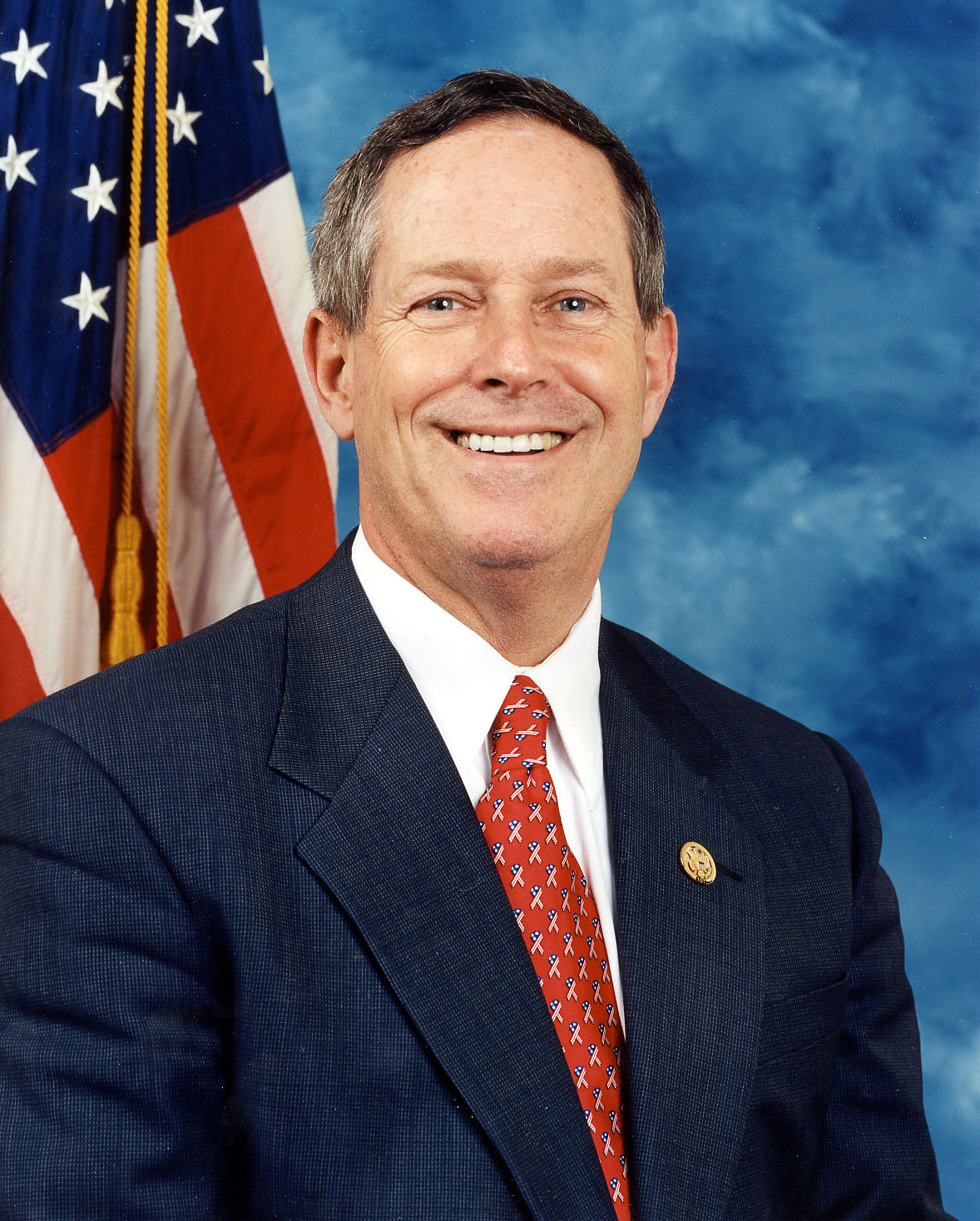

Nominee	Joe Wilson	Michael Ray Ellisor
Party	Republican	Democratic
Popular vote	181,862	93,249
Percentage	65.0%	33.3%
- County results Wilson: 50–60% 60–70% 70–80% Ellisor: 50–60% 70–80%
U.S. Representative before election
Joe Wilson (inc.)
Republican
Elected U.S. Representative
Joe Wilson
Republican

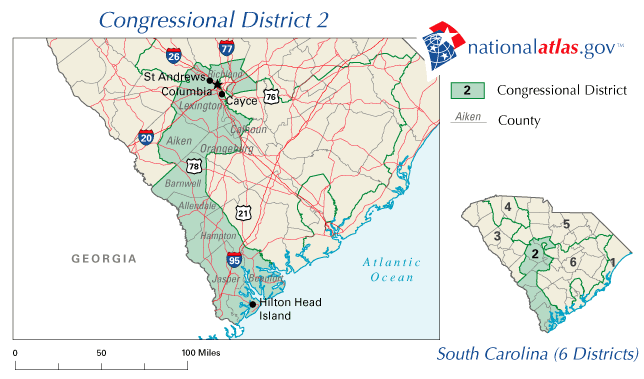

Congressman Joe Wilson has represented this strongly conservative district that runs from the southern coast of South Carolina to the suburbs of Columbia since 2001. Running for his third term, Congressman Wilson faced off against Democratic candidate Michael Ellisor and Constitution Party candidate Steve Lefemine, whom he was able to defeat comfortably.

=== Predictions ===
Source	Ranking	As of
The Cook Political Report	Safe R	October 29, 2004
Sabato's Crystal Ball	Safe R	November 1, 2004

=== Results ===
South Carolina's 2nd congressional district election, 2004
Party	Candidate	Votes	%
Republican	Joe Wilson (inc.)	181,862	64.98
Democratic	Michael Ray Ellisor	93,249	33.32
Constitution	Steve Lefemine	4,447	1.59
Write-ins		312	0.11
Total votes		279,870	100.00
Republican hold			

== District 3 ==
2004 South Carolina's 3rd congressional district election
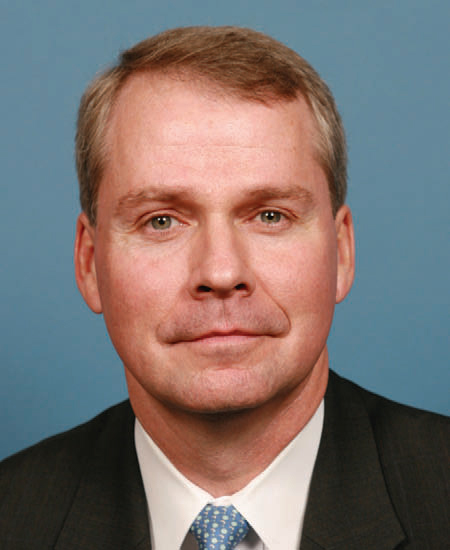
Nominee	J. Gresham Barrett
Party	Republican
Popular vote	191,052
Percentage	99.5%
U.S. Representative before election
J. Gresham Barrett (inc.)
Republican
Elected U.S. Representative
J. Gresham Barrett
Republican

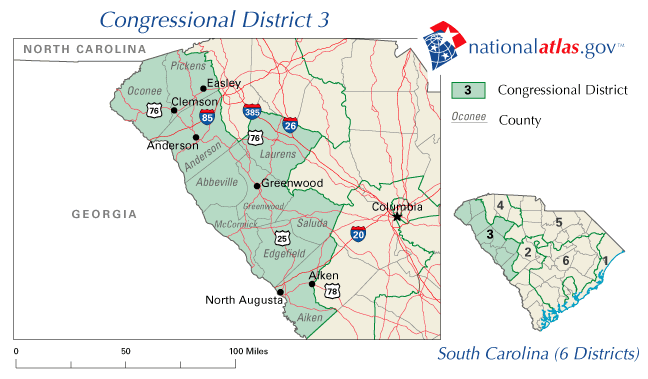

Freshman Republican Congressman J. Gresham Barrett faced no opposition in his bid for a second term in this western South Carolina district, the most conservative one in the state.

=== Predictions ===
Source	Ranking	As of
The Cook Political Report	Safe R	October 29, 2004
Sabato's Crystal Ball	Safe R	November 1, 2004

=== Results ===
South Carolina's 3rd congressional district election, 2004
Party	Candidate	Votes	%
Republican	J. Gresham Barrett (inc.)	191,052	99.51
Write-ins		947	0.49
Total votes		191,999	100.00
Republican hold			

== District 4 ==
2004 South Carolina's 4th congressional district election
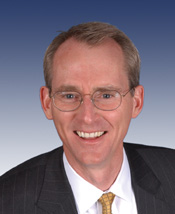

Nominee	Bob Inglis	Brandon P. Brown
Party	Republican	Democratic
Popular vote	188,795	78,376
Percentage	69.8%	29.0%
- County results Inglis: 60–70% 70–80%
U.S. Representative before election
Jim DeMint
Republican
Elected U.S. Representative
Bob Inglis
Republican

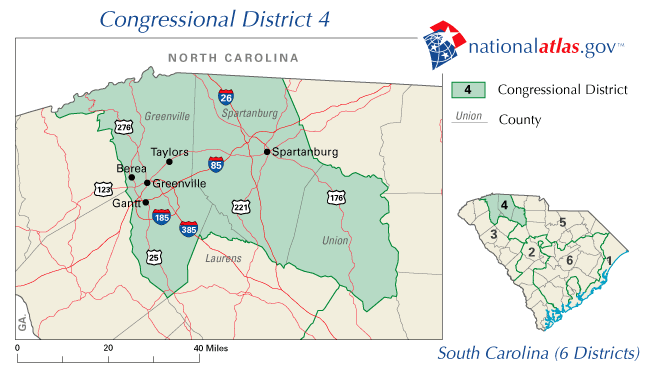

When incumbent Republican Congressman Jim DeMint decided to run for Senate instead of seeking a fourth term, former Republican Congressman Bob Inglis, who had previously represented this seat, defeated Democrat Brandon Brown and Green Party candidate Faye Walters to return to Congress for his fourth term.

=== Predictions ===
Source	Ranking	As of
The Cook Political Report	Safe R	October 29, 2004
Sabato's Crystal Ball	Safe R	November 1, 2004

=== Results ===
South Carolina's 4th congressional district election, 2004
Party	Candidate	Votes	%
Republican	Bob Inglis	188,795	69.77
Democratic	Brandon P. Brown	78,376	28.96
Green	C. Faye Walters	3,273	1.21
Write-ins		150	0.06
Total votes		270,594	100.00
Republican hold			

== District 5 ==
2004 South Carolina's 5th congressional district election
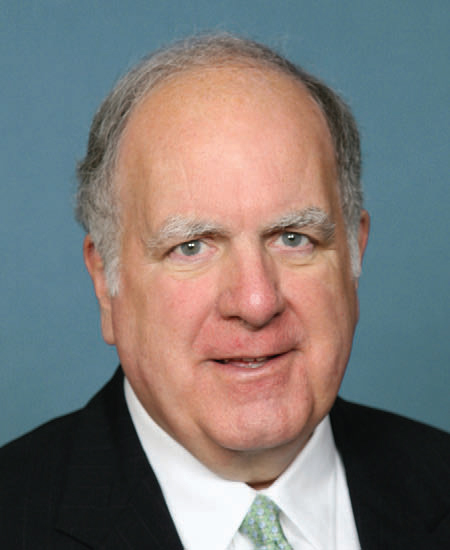

Nominee	John Spratt	Albert F. Spencer
Party	Democratic	Republican
Popular vote	152,867	89,568
Percentage	63.0%	36.9%
- County results Spratt: 50–60% 60–70% 70–80% 80–90%
U.S. Representative before election
John Spratt (inc.)
Democratic
Elected U.S. Representative
John Spratt
Democratic

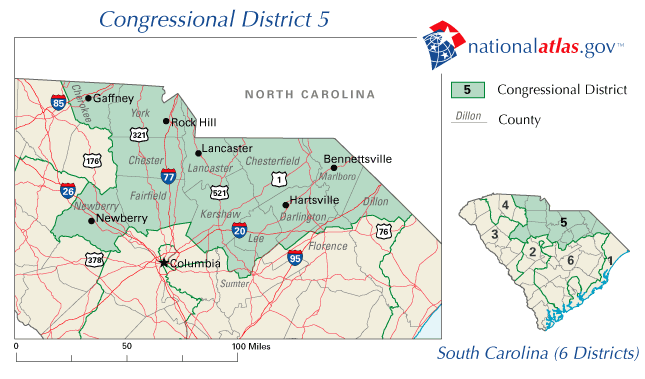

Incumbent Democratic Congressman John Spratt has represented this conservative-leaning district for thirty-two years and ran for a twelfth term this year. Though President George W. Bush comfortably won this district in 2004, Spratt was able to handily defeat Republican Albert Spencer.

=== Predictions ===
Source	Ranking	As of
The Cook Political Report	Safe D	October 29, 2004
Sabato's Crystal Ball	Safe D	November 1, 2004

=== Results ===
South Carolina's 5th congressional district election, 2004
Party	Candidate	Votes	%
Democratic	John Spratt (inc.)	152,867	63.03
Republican	Albert F. Spencer	89,568	36.93
Write-ins		83	0.03
Total votes		242,518	100.00
Democratic hold			

== District 6 ==
2004 South Carolina's 6th congressional district election
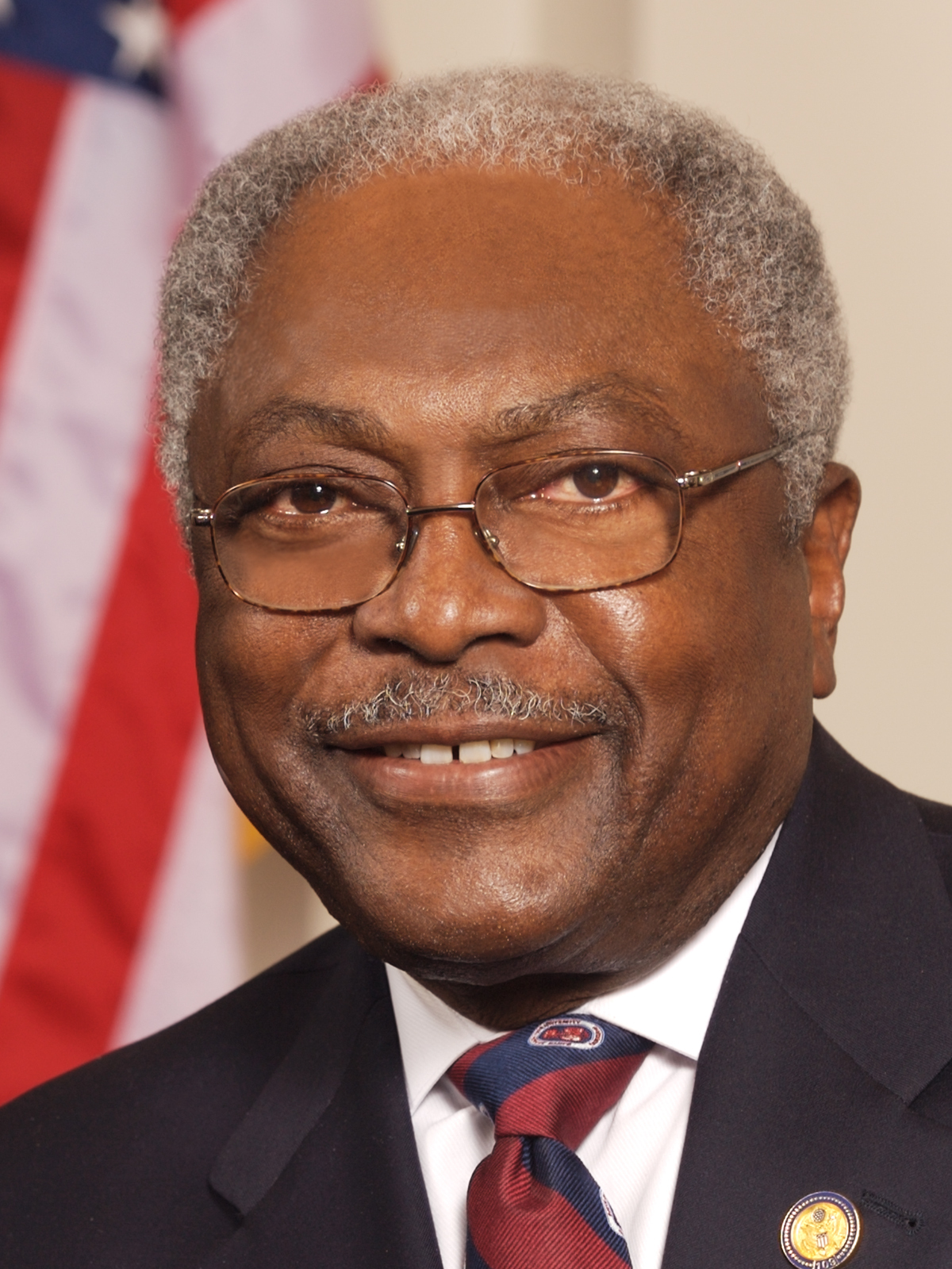

Nominee	Jim Clyburn	Gary McLeod
Party	Democratic	Republican
Popular vote	161,987	79,600
Percentage	67.0%	32.9%
- County results Clyburn: 50–60% 60–70% 70–80% 80–90%
U.S. Representative before election
Jim Clyburn (inc.)
Democratic
Elected U.S. Representative
Jim Clyburn
Democratic

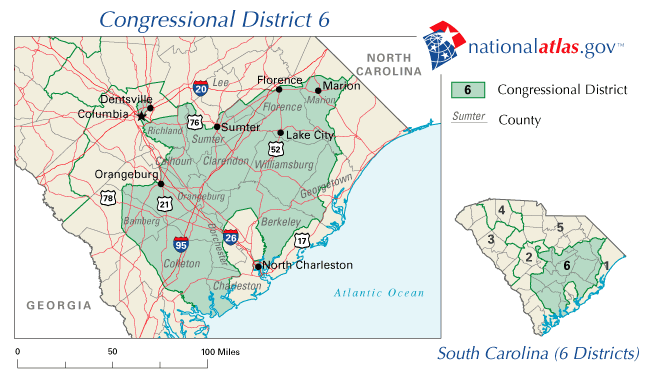

In a rematch from the 2002 election, incumbent Democratic Congressman Jim Clyburn, a member of the Democratic House leadership, encountered Republican opponent Gary McLeod, whom he defeated again this year by a similar margin from two years earlier.

=== Predictions ===
Source	Ranking	As of
The Cook Political Report	Safe D	October 29, 2004
Sabato's Crystal Ball	Safe D	November 1, 2004

=== Results ===
South Carolina's 6th congressional district election, 2004
Party	Candidate	Votes	%
Democratic	Jim Clyburn (inc.)	161,987	66.98
Republican	Gary McLeod	79,600	32.92
Write-ins		242	0.10
Total votes		241,829	100.00
Democratic hold			

== See also ==
- United States House of Representatives elections, 2004
- United States Senate election in South Carolina, 2004
- South Carolina's congressional districts
