= Harry Browne =

American writer and politician (1933–2006)

- Browne in 2000
- Born: Harry Edson Browne; June 17, 1933; New York City, New York, U.S.
- Died: March 1, 2006 (aged 72); Franklin, Tennessee, U.S.
- Height: 6 ft 4 in (193 cm)
- Political party: Libertarian
- Spouse: Pamela Lanier Wolfe
- Children: 1
- Website: Official website

Harry Edson Browne (June 17, 1933 – March 1, 2006) was an American writer, libertarian political activist, and investment advisor. He was the Libertarian Party's presidential nominee in the U.S. elections of 1996 and 2000 running on a platform that advocated abolishing the federal income tax, privatizing Social Security, ending the war on drugs, and drastically reducing the size and scope of government.

A leading figure in the modern libertarian movement, Browne was a passionate advocate for personal freedom, limited government, and voluntary cooperation. He authored 12 books that in total have sold more than 2 million copies including his influential work How I Found Freedom in an Unfree World (1973), which provided a blueprint for achieving individual liberation by rejecting societal constraints and embracing self-reliance. Through his presidential campaigns, writings, and public appearances, Browne articulated a vision of a society free from coercion, inspiring generations of libertarians to challenge political and cultural orthodoxy.

== Career ==
=== Armed services ===
He was inducted into the U.S. Army on May 5, 1953. He went to the Southwestern Signal Corps Training Center at Camp San Luis Obispo, California to study cryptography. On October 4, 1953, he was sent to Bikini Atoll in the Marshall Islands, where the 1954 Operation Castle hydrogen bomb tests were conducted.

In 1955, Browne was sent to Eniwetok to finish his tour of duty and afterwards was transferred to the Army Reserves at Fort Huachuca, Arizona. He was released from active military service on July 17, 1956. He was honorably discharged from the armed forces on February 28, 1961, and discharged from the Army Reserves on July 1, 1961.

=== Activist and author ===
Browne worked as an advertising and sales executive in the 1960s. He then devoted himself full-time to the "Americanist" cause. He believed that the newspapers of America would willingly buy material promoting the American way of life; so, in 1961 he took on the proprietorship of American Way Features, Inc., a newspaper feature service, and as managing editor inaugurated a plan to turn the service from a subsidized program into a profit-making service. It sold "Americanist" features, in competition with all the recognized syndicates. His own column, The American Way, appeared in over 200 newspapers throughout America.

In the summer of 1962, Browne was named the advertising manager for the Liberty Amendment Committee's bimonthly American Progress for Economic Freedom. In October he was named associate editor, and in November he was the editor. The following Spring the magazine was renamed Freedom Magazine, and Browne continued as its editor until February 1964 when he turned his full-time attention to the American Way Features, Inc.

=== Investment theory and the "Permanent Portfolio" concept ===
Also in the 1960s, Browne taught courses such as: The Economics of Freedom, The Tools of Success, Tools of the Market, The Economics of Success, and The Art of Profitable Living". Browne was an investment advisor for much of his life and developed the so-called "permanent portfolio" investment strategy, which claims to identify the four types of economic conditions that can apply over a given investment period, and the appropriate asset classes that give both profit from the upside of these conditions, and some measure of protection when they cease to prevail.

Browne published his first book, How You Can Profit From The Coming Devaluation, in 1970. Browne's second book, How I Found Freedom in an Unfree World, was published in 1973. You Can Profit from a Monetary Crisis was Browne's third book. He continued to write and publish books including his personal finance book, Fail-Safe Investing: Lifelong Financial Security in 30 Minutes, published in 2001. According to Browne's web site, he was a consultant to the Permanent Portfolio Fund which utilizes some of the investment strategies described in his book, Fail-Safe Investing. Browne also authored books and gave lectures on actively living a libertarian lifestyle. His book How I Found Freedom in an Unfree World gave a detailed explanation of how one can bring libertarian concepts to every aspect of one's life. His posthumously released 1960s lecture series, "The Art of Profitable Living," was released as a 20-CD album titled, "Rule Your World."

== Presidential campaigns ==
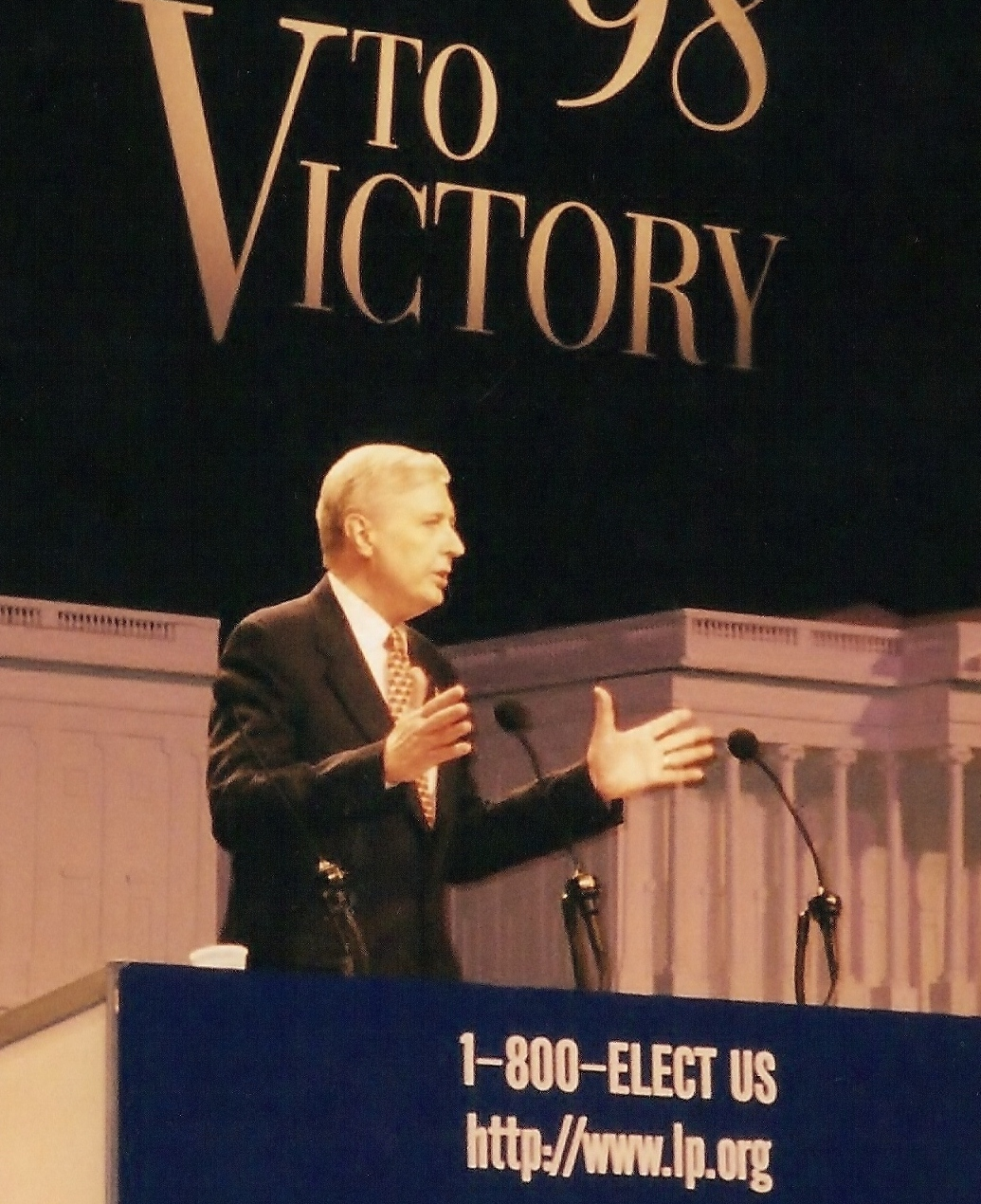
Browne speaking at the 1998 Libertarian National Convention in Arlington, Virginia.

Browne was the presidential nominee of the United States Libertarian Party in the elections of 1996 and 2000. He received 485,798 votes or 0.5% of the vote in 1996 and 384,516 votes or 0.4% of the vote in 2000.

His campaign qualified for matching funds during each election but did not accept them, per his campaign platform. Browne's refusal to accept matching funds won him expected praise from libertarians and those who are against the concept of federal matching funds, but also earned him somewhat greater exposure in the "mainstream" media. Browne said he needed to be true to what he had preached in his libertarian speeches and that "it would be highly inappropriate for me to stick my nose in the trough after having denounced the Republicans and Democrats for doing so." During both of these elections, the Libertarian Party was on the ballot in all fifty states and the District of Columbia. Browne did not appear on the 2000 Arizona ballot, however, as the Arizona Libertarian Party instead chose to run L. Neil Smith, whose candidacy was a protest against that of Browne.

Claims of wrongdoing by Libertarian National Committee staffers during Browne's 1996 presidential campaign surfaced during his second run in 2000. Browne responded to allegations surrounding the controversy.

== Later life ==
After the 2000 election, Browne continued to work to increase the popularity of libertarian goals. In addition to writing and making appearances on behalf of the Downsize DC Foundation (an organization he helped to co-found and for which he served as director of public policy for a year and a half), he hosted two weekly network radio shows, one on Saturdays dealing with politics, which he often called "The Libertarian Conversation" (since listeners were encouraged to call in), and the other on Sundays, called "The Money Show", dealing with financial topics. Both of these radio programs were on the Genesis Communications Network. Browne also worked with the Free Market News Network, of which he was the president for much of 2005 and a senior political analyst. Via Free Market News, he had his own internet-based television show called This Week in Liberty, which ran for 25 episodes.

Near the end of his life, he worked on a book called The War Racket: The Lies, Myths, and Propaganda that Feed the American War Machine. War, he contended, was just another government program, and was essentially flawed because "government never solves anything." According to Jim Babka, "As Harry explained to me, the book was unlike any other he had ever written. Harry was well-read in his history, but after starting on the project he realized that 'well-read' wasn't enough." According to Browne's wife, Pamela, he collected over 400 books, read almost all of them, and made copious notes. He was struggling with the book's structure at the time of his death.

Browne also authored thousands of articles and was a contributor to the news and opinion blog LewRockwell.com, to Antiwar.com, and to World Net Daily. He published the financial newsletter Harry Browne Special Reports from 1974 to 1997.

== Death ==
On March 1, 2006, Browne died of ALS at his home in Franklin, Tennessee. He was 72 years old. Later that month Browne was eulogized by U.S. Congressman Ron Paul.

== Bibliography ==
Books

- How You Can Profit from the Coming Devaluation. Arlington House. 1970. ISBN 978-0-87000-073-7. OCLC 74182.
- How I Found Freedom in an Unfree World: A Handbook for Personal Liberty (25th anniversary ed.). LiamWorks. 1998. ISBN 978-0-965-60367-6. OCLC 39318909.
- You Can Profit from a Monetary Crisis. Macmillan. 1974. ISBN 978-0-02-517460-3. OCLC 724288.
- Complete Guide to Swiss Bank Accounts. McGraw-Hill. 1976. ISBN 978-0-07-008483-4. OCLC 2072816.
- New Profits from the Monetary Crisis. William Morrow & Co. 1978. ISBN 978-0-688-03373-6. OCLC 4194700.
- Inflation-Proofing Your Investments. William Morrow & Co. 1981. ISBN 978-0-688-03576-1. OCLC 6916595. (with Terry Coxon)
- Why the Best-Laid Investment Plans Usually Go Wrong & How You Can Find Safety and Profit in an Uncertain World. William Morrow & Co. 1987. ISBN 978-0-688-05995-8. OCLC 16226356.
- The Economic Time Bomb: How You Can Profit from the Emerging Crises. St. Martin's Press. 1989. ISBN 978-0-312-02581-6. OCLC 18558381.
- Why Government Doesn't Work. St. Martin's Press. 1995. ISBN 978-0-312-13623-9. OCLC 32625515.
- Fail-Safe Investing: Lifelong Financial Security in 30 Minutes. St. Martin's Press. 1999. ISBN 978-0-312-24703-4. OCLC 41368221.
- The Great Libertarian Offer. LiamWorks. 2000. ISBN 978-0-965-60369-0. OCLC 44756859.

Unfinished books

- The War Racket (unfinished at the time of his death)

Posthumous collections

Since his death, Harry's wife Pamela has put together several collections of his speeches and writings in audio and e-book format.

- 99% of All You Need to Know About Money & its Effect Upon the Economy
- Freedom Speeches, Volume 1
- Freedom Speeches, Volume 2
- Freedom Speeches, Volume 3
- Freedom the American Way
- How You Can Profit from the Coming Devaluation & Monetary Crisis
- Investment Strategy in an Uncertain World
- Rule Your World!
- The Secret of Selling ~ Anything
- The War Racket – Part 1
- The War Racket – Part 2
- 2000+ Libertarian Quotes
- Libertarian FAQ
- Great Libertarian Speeches
- The Great Libertarian Communicator

Party political offices
Preceded by Andre Marrou	Libertarian nominee for President of the United States; 1996, 2000	Succeeded by Michael Badnarik
