= Read the Bills Act =

The Read the Bills Act (RTBA) is proposed legislation intended to require the United States Congress to read the legislation that it passes. It was originally written in 2006 by Downsize DC, a non-profit organization focused on decreasing the size of the federal government. The proposed act is a response to the passing of bills that are thousands of pages long and are passed without copies being made available to the members of Congress who vote on the bill. The bill is aimed at limiting the size and growth of the federal government.

Senator Rand Paul (R-KY) stated his support for it in November 2010. Paul went on to sponsor and propose the bill in the 112th congress as S.3360 on June 28, 2012.

Congress	Short title	Bill number(s)	Date introduced	Sponsor(s)	# of cosponsors	Latest status
112th Congress	Read the Bills Act	S. 3360	June 28, 2012	Rand Paul (R-KY)	0	Died in committee
113th Congress	Read the Bills Act	H.R. 1831	May 6, 2013	Kerry Bentivolio (R-MI)	1	Died in committee
113th Congress	Read the Bills Act	S. 1665	November 7, 2013	Rand Paul (R-KY)	0	Died in committee
114th Congress	Read the Bills Act	S. 1571	June 15, 2015	Rand Paul (R-KY)	0	Died in committee
115th Congress	Read the Bills Act	S. 3709	December 5, 2018	Rand Paul (R-KY)	0	Died in committee
116th Congress	Read the Bills Act	S. 3879	June 3, 2020	Rand Paul (R-KY)	0	Died in committee
117th Congress	Read the Bills Act	S. 103	January 28, 2021	Rand Paul (R-KY)	0	Died in committee
118th Congress	Read the Bills Act	S. 328	February 9, 2023	Rand Paul (R-KY)	0	Died in committee
119th Congress	Read the Bills Act	S. 55	January 9, 2025	Rand Paul (R-KY)	0	Referred to committee

Similarly, a separate bill nicknamed the "Read the Bill Act" would require bills to be posted publicly 72 hours prior to consideration in Congress. Unlike the Downsize DC proposal, this bill is supported by ReadTheBill.org (part of the Sunlight Foundation) with the primary aim to increase transparency in government. It was introduced in the U.S. House (by Brian Baird in 2006 H.Res. 688, 2007 H.Res. 504, and 2009 H.Res. 554) and Senate (by Jim Bunning in 2009 S.Res. 307, and by John Ensign in 2011 S.Res. 16). The Senate version differs in a few ways, including a requirement to have the Congressional Budget Office provide an evaluation of the proposed legislation.

== See also ==
- Downsize DC Foundation
