= Liz J. Patterson =

American politician (1939–2018)

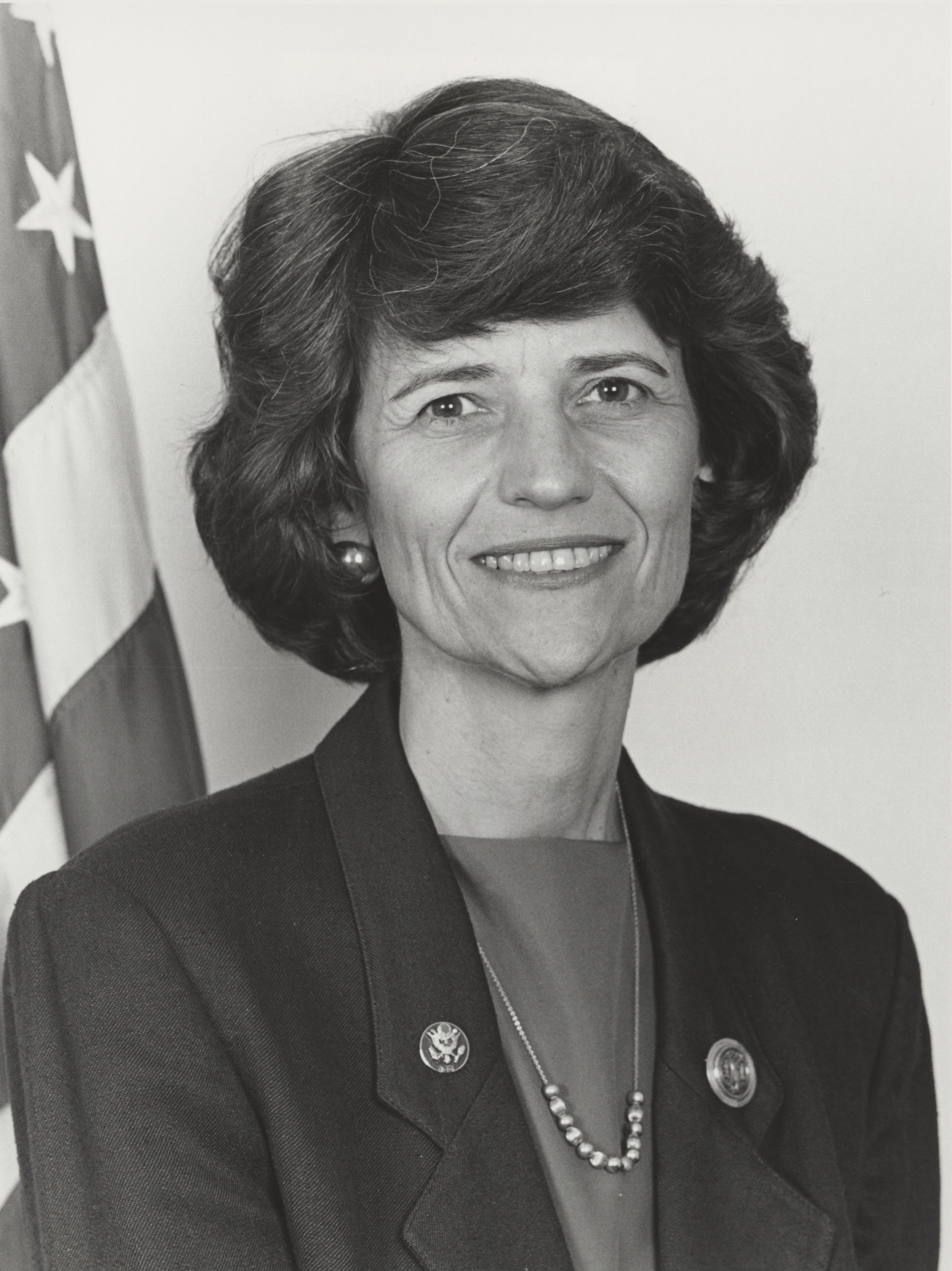

Member of the U.S. House of Representatives from South Carolina's 4th district
- In office January 3, 1987 – January 3, 1993
- Preceded by: Carroll A. Campbell Jr.
- Succeeded by: Bob Inglis

Member of the South Carolina Senate
- In office January 8, 1980 – January 3, 1987
- Preceded by: James B. Stephen
- Succeeded by: John R. Russell
- Constituency: 4th district (1980–1985); 12th district (1985–1987)

Personal details
- Born: Gladys Elizabeth Johnston; November 18, 1939 Columbia, South Carolina, U.S.
- Died: November 10, 2018 (aged 78) Spartanburg, South Carolina, U.S.
- Party: Democratic

Gladys Elizabeth Johnston Patterson (November 18, 1939 – November 10, 2018) was an American politician from South Carolina. A member of the Democratic Party, she was a three-term member of the United States House of Representatives from 1987 to 1993.

== Early life and education ==
Gladys Elizabeth Johnston, known as "Liz", was born into a Democratic political family. Her father, Olin D. Johnston, was Governor of South Carolina from 1935 to 1939 and again from 1943 to 1945. He then served in the United States Senate from 1945 until his death in 1965.

Her family lived outside Washington, D.C., in Kensington, Maryland, where she grew up during those years. She returned to South Carolina for college, graduating from Columbia College and doing graduate work at the University of South Carolina.

== Career ==
Early in her career, Johnston worked in Washington, D.C. for the Peace Corps and the Office of Economic Opportunity during the administration of President Lyndon B. Johnson. Patterson also worked as the South Carolina director of the Head Start Program and as an assistant to Congressman James R. Mann.

She returned to live in Spartanburg County, where she was elected to the County Council, serving from 1975 to 1976. In 1978 she was elected to the South Carolina State Senate, serving from 1979 to 1986. She was the second woman in the South Carolina Senate, after Mary Gordon Ellis.

In 1986 Patterson was elected to the U.S. House of Representatives from South Carolina's 4th congressional district in 1986, succeeding Carroll A. Campbell Jr., who had given up the seat to make a successful run for governor of South Carolina. She narrowly defeated Bill Workman, the mayor of Greenville, despite Campbell's presence at the top of the Republican ticket. Patterson was the first woman elected to Congress from South Carolina in her own right; the previous three, Elizabeth Hawley Gasque, Willa L. Fulmer, and Corinne Boyd Riley, had been elected in special elections after their husbands died in office. She served on the House committees on Banking and Veterans Affairs, as well as the Select Committee on Hunger.

Bill Workman's father, W. D. Workman Jr., a journalist and author, had been her father's Republican opponent in the 1962 general election, when Johnston won his last term in the U.S. Senate.

Patterson was narrowly reelected in 1988, when she defeated Republican attorney and city councilman Knox H. White. George H. W. Bush carried the 4th district by the largest margin in the state. She won a third term with a greater margin in 1990 over Terry Haskins, a state Representative from Greenville. That year Campbell, as the Republican incumbent, won reelection as governor in a landslide.

Although Patterson represented a district that had been trending Republican for some time, she was thought to be a fairly secure incumbent, given her family ties and her victory in three successive elections under difficult conditions. However, she was narrowly defeated for re-election in 1992 by Republican Bob Inglis, an attorney who had never run for office before. As in 1988, George H. W. Bush carried the 4th with his largest margin in the state. After Patterson left office in 1993, no woman would serve in Congress from South Carolina until 2021, when Nancy Mace took office following her defeat of Joe Cunningham in 2020, and Democrats have only tallied more than 40 percent in the 4th district once since 1992.

Patterson was the unsuccessful Democratic nominee for Lieutenant Governor of South Carolina in 1994. She taught political science at Spartanburg Methodist College, as well as being on the board of trustees, and was the chairwoman of the Spartanburg County Democratic Party.

Paterson died on November 10, 2018, just eight days shy of her 79th birthday. Governor Henry McMaster announced that flags would be lowered in the late Congresswoman's honor. On November 14, 2018, Executive Order 2018-56 was filed for that purpose.

== See also ==
- Women in the United States House of Representatives

South Carolina Senate
Preceded by James B. Stephen	Member of the South Carolina Senate from the 4th district 1980-1985	Succeeded by Charles L. Powell
Preceded by Single-member district established	Member of the South Carolina Senate from the 12th district 1985-1987	Succeeded by John R. Russell
U.S. House of Representatives
Preceded by Carroll A. Campbell Jr.	Member of the U.S. House of Representatives from South Carolina's 4th congressional district 1987–1993	Succeeded by Bob Inglis
Party political offices
Preceded by Nick Theodore	Democratic nominee for Lieutenant Governor of South Carolina; 1994	Succeeded by Nick Theodore
