= List of unsuccessful major party candidates for Vice President of the United States =

The United States has had a two-party system for much of its history, and the two major parties have nominated vice presidential candidates in most presidential elections. Since the ratification of the United States Constitution in 1789, there have been 59 unsuccessful major party candidates for Vice President of the United States. Eight other individuals have served as the main running mate to a third party or independent presidential candidate who won at least ten percent of the popular or electoral vote.

Prior to the ratification of the Twelfth Amendment in 1804, each member of the Electoral College cast two votes for president; whichever individual who won the most electoral votes would become president, while the individual with the second-most electoral votes would become vice president. In the elections of 1792, 1796, and 1800, at least one of the major parties ran a candidate whom they intended to elect vice president. The Twelfth Amendment changed the presidential election process, requiring members of the Electoral College to cast separate votes for president and vice president. Since then, the two major parties have almost always nominated a ticket consisting of a single presidential candidate and a single vice presidential candidate. Before the election of 1832, both major parties used a congressional nominating caucus, or nominations by state legislatures, to determine presidential and vice presidential candidates. Since 1840, each major party has consistently nominated a single ticket at their respective presidential nominating conventions.

The two current major parties are the Democratic Party and the Republican Party. At various points prior to the American Civil War, the Federalist Party, the Democratic-Republican Party, the National Republican Party, and the Whig Party were major parties. In the 1872 presidential election, the Liberal Republican Party put forward an unsuccessful major party vice presidential nominee, Benjamin Gratz Brown. Brown and his running mate, Horace Greeley, were also nominated by the Democratic Party.

== List of unsuccessful candidates ==
=== Major parties ===
These unsuccessful vice presidential candidates served as the main running mate of a major party presidential candidate who competed in multiple states, or they were a major party's main vice presidential candidate in multiple states.

- * indicates that the candidate served as vice president at some point in their career

Federalist Democratic-Republican National Republican Whig Liberal Republican Democratic Republican
Election	Candidate						Running mate
Election	Candidate (Birth–death)		Party	Office at time of election (Note: The most recent elective office, or senior appointive position, held by the candidate either on election day or in November of the election year.)	Home state (Note: State of primary residence at the time of the election.)	EV% (Note: For elections held prior to 1804, this column represents the share of electors who cast a vote for the candidate. For elections held since 1804, this column represents the share of the total electoral vote for vice president won by the candidate.)	Running mate
1792 (Note: In the 1792 election, George Washington effectively ran unopposed for president, but the emerging Democratic-Republican Party attempted to defeat Vice President John Adams's bid for re-election. Adams won re-election with 77 electoral votes, while Clinton won 50 electoral votes Thomas Jefferson, won four electoral votes, and Aaron Burr won one electoral vote.)	George Clinton* (1739–1812)		Democratic-Republican	Governor	NY	37%	None
1796 (Note: The Democratic-Republicans may or may not have officially nominated Thomas Jefferson for president through a congressional nominating caucus, but Jefferson was widely regarded as the party's main presidential candidate in the 1796 election. The Democratic-Republicans did not select an official vice presidential candidate. Aaron Burr finished with the second-most electoral votes among individuals affiliated with the party, while Samuel Adams and George Clinton each received several electoral votes. Federalist leaders agreed to support a ticket of John Adams and Thomas Pinckney, though it is unclear whether they formally nominated the ticket at a congressional nominating caucus. Ultimately, Adams won the most electoral votes and became president. Because Jefferson won more electoral votes than Pinckney or Burr, he was elected as vice president.)	Thomas Pinckney (1750–1828)		Federalist	Fmr. Ambassador	SC	43.7%	John Adams
1796	Aaron Burr* (1756–1836)		Democratic-Republican	Senator	NY	22.2%	Thomas Jefferson
1800 (Note: Both parties held congressional nominating caucuses to nominate presidential candidates in 1800. The Democratic-Republicans nominated Thomas Jefferson and Aaron Burr, while the Federalists nominated John Adams and Charles Cotesworth Pinckney. Some Federalist leaders, including Alexander Hamilton, favored Pinckney over Adams, but Adams won one more electoral vote than Pinckney. Jefferson and Burr each won the votes of 73 presidential electors, more than either of the Federalist candidates. Because Jefferson and Burr tied in the electoral vote, the election was decided by a contingent election held in the House of Representatives; Jefferson was elected president and Burr became vice president.)	Charles C. Pinckney (1746–1825)	Charles Cotesworth Pinckney	Federalist	Fmr. Ambassador	SC	36.4%	John Adams
1804	Rufus King (1755–1827)		Federalist	Fmr. Ambassador	NY	8%	Charles C. Pinckney
1808	Rufus King (1755–1827)		Federalist	Fmr. Ambassador	NY	26.7%	Charles C. Pinckney
1812	Jared Ingersoll (1749–1822)		Federalist	State attorney general (Note: Ingersoll had also served as a delegate to the Continental Congress and to the Constitutional Convention.)	PA	39.4%	DeWitt Clinton
1816 (Note: The Federalists did not nominate a ticket in 1816, though some Federalists were elected to serve as presidential electors. A majority of the Federalist electors cast their presidential vote for Rufus King and their vice presidential vote for Howard.)	John E. Howard (1752–1827)		Federalist	Fmr. Senator	MD	10%	Rufus King
1824 (Note: In the election 1824, no presidential candidate won a majority of the electoral vote for president, but John C. Calhoun won a majority of the electoral vote for vice president. Most presidential electors who voted for either John Quincy Adams or Andrew Jackson for president voted for Calhoun for vice president. Similarly, most electors who cast their presidential vote for Henry Clay cast their vice presidential vote for Nathaniel Macon, and most electors who cast their presidential vote for William H. Crawford cast their vice presidential vote for Sanford.)	Nathan Sanford (1777–1838)		Democratic-Republican	State judge (Note: Sanford was the Chancellor of New York, the highest-ranking judge in the state. He had also served in the United States Senate.)	NY	11.5%	Henry Clay
1824	Nathaniel Macon (1757–1837)		Democratic-Republican	Senator	NC	9.2%	William H. Crawford
1828	Richard Rush (1780–1859)		National Republican	Secretary of the Treasury	PA	31.8%	John Quincy Adams
1832	John Sergeant 1779–1852		National Republican	Fmr. Representative	PA	17.1%	Henry Clay
1836 (Note: The Whigs did not select an official presidential or vice presidential nominee in 1836. In most Northern states, the Whigs fielded a ticket of William Henry Harrison and Francis Granger, and in most Southern states, the Whigs fielded a ticket of Hugh Lawson White and John Tyler. Granger, Tyler, and two Democrats, Richard Mentor Johnson and William Smith, each won a share of the electoral vote. Because no one candidate won a majority of the electoral vote for vice president, the Senate held a contingent election to select the vice president. In the only contingent election that the Senate has ever held, Johnson defeated Granger.)	Francis Granger (1792–1868)		Whig	Representative	NY	26.2%	William Henry Harrison
1836	John Tyler* (1790–1862)		Whig	Fmr. Senator	VA	16%	Hugh Lawson White
1840 (Note: The 1840 Democratic National Convention denied renomination to Vice President Richard Mentor Johnson, and the Democrats failed to officially nominate a vice presidential candidate in 1840. Nonetheless, 48 of the 60 presidential electors who cast their presidential vote for Van Buren cast their vice presidential vote for Johnson. Most of the remaining Van Buren electors cast their vice presidential vote for Littleton Waller Tazewell.)	Richard M. Johnson* (1780–1850)		Democratic	Vice President	KY	16.3%	Martin Van Buren
1844	Theodore Frelinghuysen (1787–1862)		Whig	Fmr. Senator	NJ	38.2%	Henry Clay
1848	William O. Butler (1791–1880)		Democratic	Fmr. Representative (Note: Butler had also served as a major general of volunteers in the Mexican–American War.)	KY	43.8%	Lewis Cass
1852	William A. Graham (1804–1875)		Whig	Secretary of the Navy	NC	14.2%	Winfield Scott
1856 (Note: After the collapse of the Whig Party in the mid-1850s, the Republican Party and the American Party (the political organization of the Know Nothing movement) emerged as the major challengers to the Democratic Party. By 1856, neither the Republican nor the American Party had truly supplanted the Whig Party as the second major political party in the United States. Nonetheless, the American Party is frequently described as a third party. After the 1856 election, the Republican Party firmly established itself as one of the two major parties alongside the Democratic Party, while the American Party collapsed.)	William L. Dayton (1807–1864)		Republican	Fmr. Senator	NJ	38.5%	John C. Frémont
1860 (Note: The Democratic Party fractured along sectional lines in 1860 and held multiple national conventions. The Northern Democrats nominated Douglas and the Southern Democrats nominated Vice President John C. Breckinridge. Many sources include Breckinridge as a third party candidate, but other sources do not.)	Herschel V. Johnson (1812–1880)		Democratic	Fmr. Governor	GA	4%	Stephen A. Douglas
1864	George H. Pendleton (1825–1889)		Democratic	Representative	OH	9%	George B. McClellan
1868	Francis P. Blair Jr. (1821–1875)		Democratic	Fmr. Representative	MO	25.2%	Horatio Seymour
1872	Benjamin G. Brown (1826–1885)		Liberal Republican and Democratic (Note: Horace Greeley and Benjamin Gratz Brown were nominated by the Liberal Republican Party, a splinter group of Republicans. The ticket of Greeley and Brown was later nominated by the 1872 Democratic National Convention, as the Democrats hoped to defeat President Ulysses S. Grant's re-election bid by uniting with the Liberal Republicans.)	Governor	MO	13.4%	Horace Greeley
1876	Thomas A. Hendricks* (1819–1885)		Democratic	Governor	IN	49.9%	Samuel Tilden
1880	William H. English (1822–1896)		Democratic	Fmr. Representative	IN	42%	Winfield Scott Hancock
1884	John A. Logan (1826–1886)		Republican	Senator	IL	45.4%	James G. Blaine
1888	Allen G. Thurman (1813–1895)		Democratic	Fmr. Senator	OH	41.9%	Grover Cleveland
1892	Whitelaw Reid (1837–1912)		Republican	Fmr. Ambassador	NY	32.7%	Benjamin Harrison
1896 (Note: In 1896, after William Jennings Bryan won the Democratic presidential nomination, he was also nominated by the Populist Party, a major third party. The Populist vice presidential nominee was Thomas E. Watson. Bryan's running mate on the Democratic ticket, Arthur Sewall, won 149 electoral votes for vice president, while Watson won 27 electoral votes for vice president.)	Arthur Sewall (1835–1900)		Democratic	None (Note: Sewall was a shipbuilder as well as a member of the Democratic National Committee from 1888 to 1896.)	ME	33.3%	William Jennings Bryan
1900	Adlai Stevenson I* (1835–1914)		Democratic	Fmr. Vice President	IL	34.7%	William Jennings Bryan
1904	Henry G. Davis (1823–1916)		Democratic	Fmr. Senator	WV	29.4%	Alton B. Parker
1908	John W. Kern (1849–1917)		Democratic	Fmr. state senator (Note: Kern was the Democratic nominee for Governor of Indiana in the 1900 and 1904 elections.)	IN	33.5%	William Jennings Bryan
1912 (Note: Sherman died on October 30, 1912, and Taft did not name another running mate before the 1912 election was held. After the election, the Republican National Committee designated Nicholas Murray Butler as Taft's running mate for the purposes of the electoral vote, and Butler received eight electoral votes.)	James S. Sherman* (1855–1912)		Republican	Vice President	NY	1.5%	William Howard Taft
1916	Charles W. Fairbanks* (1852–1918)		Republican	Fmr. Vice President	IN	47.8%	Charles Evans Hughes
1920	Franklin D. Roosevelt (1882–1945)		Democratic	Fmr. Assistant; Secretary of the Navy	NY	23.9%	James M. Cox
1924	Charles W. Bryan (1867–1945)		Democratic	Governor	NE	25.6%	John W. Davis
1928	Joseph T. Robinson (1872–1937)		Democratic	Senator	AR	16.4%	Al Smith
1932	Charles Curtis* (1860–1936)		Republican	Vice President	KS	11.1%	Herbert Hoover
1936	Frank Knox (1874–1944)		Republican	None (Note: Knox was primarily known as the editor of the Chicago Daily News.)	IL	1.5%	Alf Landon
1940	Charles L. McNary (1874–1944)		Republican	Senator	OR	15.4%	Wendell Willkie
1944	John W. Bricker (1893–1986)		Republican	Governor	OH	18.6%	Thomas E. Dewey
1948	Earl Warren (1891–1974)		Republican	Governor	CA	35.6%	Thomas E. Dewey
1952	John Sparkman (1899–1985)		Democratic	Senator	AL	16.8%	Adlai Stevenson II
1956	Estes Kefauver (1903–1963)		Democratic	Senator	TN	13.7%	Adlai Stevenson II
1960	Henry Cabot Lodge Jr. (1902–1985)		Republican	Fmr. Ambassador	MA	40.8%	Richard Nixon
1964	William E. Miller (1914–1983)		Republican	Representative (Note: Miller also served as Chairman of the Republican National Committee from 1961 to 1964.)	NY	9.7%	Barry Goldwater
1968	Edmund Muskie (1914–1996)		Democratic	Senator	ME	35.5%	Hubert Humphrey
1972 (Note: The 1972 Democratic National Convention selected Thomas Eagleton as the party's vice presidential nominee, but Eagleton dropped out of the race after it was publicly disclosed that he had undergone electroconvulsive therapy in order to treat depression. Shriver replaced Eagleton on the Democratic ticket.)	Sargent Shriver (1915–2011)		Democratic	Fmr. Ambassador	MD	3.2%	George McGovern
1976	Bob Dole (1923–2021)		Republican	Senator	KS	44.8%	Gerald Ford
1980	Walter Mondale* (1928–2021)		Democratic	Vice President	MN	9.1%	Jimmy Carter
1984	Geraldine Ferraro (1935–2011)		Democratic	Representative	NY	2.4%	Walter Mondale
1988	Lloyd Bentsen (1921–2006)		Democratic	Senator	TX	20.6%	Michael Dukakis
1992	Dan Quayle* (born 1947)		Republican	Vice President	IN	31.2%	George H. W. Bush
1996	Jack Kemp (1935–2009)		Republican	Fmr. Secretary of HUD	NY	29.6%	Bob Dole
2000	Joe Lieberman (1942–2024)		Democratic	Senator	CT	49.4%	Al Gore
2004	John Edwards (born 1953)		Democratic	Senator	NC	46.8%	John Kerry
2008	Sarah Palin (born 1964)		Republican	Governor	AK	32.2%	John McCain
2012	Paul Ryan (born 1970)		Republican	Representative	WI	38.3%	Mitt Romney
2016	Tim Kaine (born 1958)		Democratic	Senator	VA	42.2%	Hillary Clinton
2020	Mike Pence* (born 1959)		Republican	Vice President	IN	43.1%	Donald Trump
2024	Tim Walz (born 1964)		Democratic	Governor	MN	42%	Kamala Harris

=== Major third parties and independents ===
These third party and independent candidates won at least ten percent of the electoral vote for vice president, or served as the main running mate to a third party or independent presidential candidate who won at least ten percent of the popular vote for president.

Free Soil American Southern Democratic Constitutional Union Progressive (1912) Progressive (1924) American Independent Independent
Election	Candidate					Running mate
Election	Candidate (Birth–death)	Party	Office at time of election	Home state	EV% (Note: For elections held prior to 1804, this column represents the share of electors who cast a vote for the candidate. For elections held since 1804, this column represents the share of the total electoral vote for vice president won by the candidate.)	Running mate
1848	Charles Francis Adams Sr. (1807–1886)	Free Soil	Fmr. state senator	MA	0%	Martin Van Buren
1856	Andrew Jackson Donelson (1799–1871)	American	Fmr. Ambassador	TN	2.7%	Millard Fillmore
1860	Joseph Lane (1801–1881)	Southern Democratic	Senator	OR	23.8%	John C. Breckinridge
1860	Edward Everett (1794–1865)	Constitutional Union	Fmr. Secretary of State	MA	12.9%	John Bell
1912	Hiram Johnson (1866–1945)	Progressive	Governor	CA	16.6%	Theodore Roosevelt
1924	Burton K. Wheeler (1882–1975)	Progressive	Senator	MT	2.4%	Robert La Follette
1968	Curtis LeMay (1906–1990)	American Independent	General	CA	8.6%	George Wallace
1992	James Stockdale (1923–2005)	Independent	Vice Admiral	CA	0%	Ross Perot

== See also ==
- List of people who received an electoral vote in the United States Electoral College
- List of United States Electoral College results
- List of vice presidents of the United States
- List of unsuccessful major party candidates for President of the United States
