= List of unsuccessful major party candidates for President of the United States =

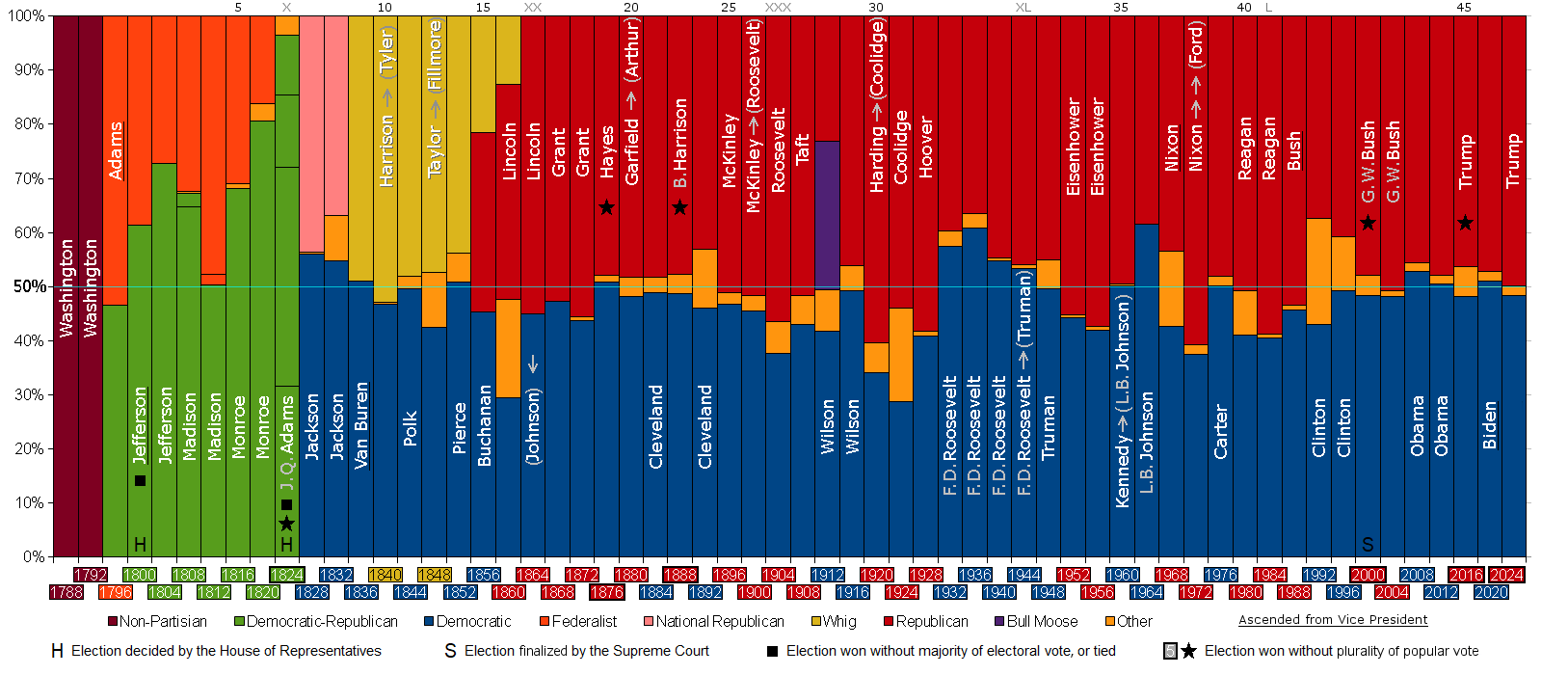
Popular vote of political parties in United States presidential elections up to 2024

Since the ratification of the United States Constitution in 1788, there have been 52 unsuccessful major party candidates for President of the United States. (Note: There have been 59 unsuccessful major party candidacies by 52 individuals in 56 of the 59 presidential elections. This figure does not include individuals who were affiliated with a major party but were not the primary nominee of that party and only competed in a small fraction of the states that participated in the election.) Additionally, since 1796, eight third party or independent candidates have won at least ten percent of the popular or electoral vote, but all failed to win the presidency.

Since the ratification of the Twelfth Amendment prior to the 1804 presidential election, the winner of any given presidential election is the candidate that receives the majority of the electoral vote. (Note: Prior to the 1804 elections, each elector cast two electoral votes, an in each of the first four elections the individual with the most electoral votes became president.) Under the rules established by the Twelfth Amendment, if no individual wins a majority of the electoral vote, then the United States House of Representatives holds a contingent election to determine the election winner; contingent elections have decided the winners of two presidential elections. Since 1824, the national popular vote has been recorded, but the national popular vote does not determine the winner of the presidential election. There have been five presidential elections in which the winner did not win a majority or a plurality of the popular vote.

The United States has had a two-party system for much of its history, and the major parties of the two-party system have dominated presidential elections for most of U.S. history. The two current major parties are the Democratic Party and the Republican Party. At various points prior to the American Civil War, the Federalist Party, the Democratic-Republican Party, the National Republican Party, and the Whig Party were major parties. These six parties have nominated candidates in the vast majority of presidential elections, but six presidential elections deviate from the normal pattern of two major party candidates. There were no major party candidates for president in the presidential election of 1789 and the presidential election of 1792, (Note: Though Washington did not receive serious opposition in the 1792 election, the nascent Democratic-Republican Party attempted to defeat Vice President John Adams's bid for re-election. The Democratic-Republican candidate, George Clinton, finished with 50 electoral votes, but Adams won re-election with 77 electoral votes.) both of which were won by George Washington. In the 1812 presidential election, DeWitt Clinton served as the de facto Federalist nominee even though he was a member of the Democratic-Republican Party; Clinton was defeated by Democratic-Republican President James Madison. In the presidential election of 1820, incumbent President James Monroe of the Democratic-Republican Party effectively ran unopposed. (Note: The Federalist Party did not nominate a presidential candidate and essentially conceded the 1820 presidential election before it was held. Monroe did not face any opposition in the election, although one presidential elector, William Plumer, cast his vote for John Quincy Adams.) In the 1824 presidential election, four Democratic-Republicans competed in multiple states in the general election as the party was unable to agree on a single nominee. Similarly, in the presidential election of 1836, the Whig Party did not unify around a single candidate and two different Whig candidates competed in multiple states in the general election.

Several former, incumbent, or future presidents have unsuccessfully sought the presidency. Several individuals have unsuccessfully sought the presidency as the candidate of a major party multiple times; only Henry Clay and William Jennings Bryan have done so thrice. (Note: Additionally, George Clinton, Aaron Burr, and Charles Cotesworth Pinckney each received electoral votes for president in three elections that they did not win. However, each of those candidates was their party's actual or de facto vice presidential nominee in at least one of those elections.) Seven different third parties have nominated a candidate who won at least ten percent of the electoral vote or at least ten percent of the popular vote in a single election, and who was not nominated by a major party in that election. Two of those candidates, Theodore Roosevelt and John C. Breckinridge, finished with the second-highest share of the electoral vote. Since 1796, just one independent candidate, Ross Perot, has accrued more than ten percent of the popular or electoral vote. One third-party candidate, Horace Greeley of the Liberal Republican Party, was nominated by a major party only after being nominated by a third party. (Note: Other third parties, such as the Populist Party, have nominated individuals who had previously been nominated for president by a major party.)

== List of unsuccessful candidates ==
=== Major parties ===
- * indicates that the candidate served as the president of the United States at some other point in their career
- † indicates that the candidate won a majority or plurality of the popular vote
- ‡ indicates that the candidate won a plurality of the electoral vote
- PV% indicates the share of the popular vote won by that candidate
- EV% indicates the share of the electoral vote won by that candidate

Democratic-Republican Federalist National Republican Whig Liberal Republican Democratic Republican
| Election | | Candidate | | | | | Vote | | Running mate | Defeated by |
| Election | | Candidate (Birth–death) | | Party | Office at time of election (Note: The most recent elective office, or senior appointive position, held by the candidate when the presidential election was held.) | Home state (Note: State of primary residence at the time of the election.) | PV% | EV% (Note: This column reflects the share of the total presidential electoral vote won by the losing candidate. Prior to the ratification of the Twelfth Amendment in 1804, each member of the Electoral College cast two votes, with no distinction made between electoral votes for president and electoral votes for vice president. For the elections of 1796 and 1800, the number in this column reflects the share of presidential electors who cast one of their two votes for Jefferson (in 1796) or Adams (in 1800).) | Running mate | Defeated by |
|---|---|---|---|---|---|---|---|---|---|---|
| 1 | 1796 (Note: Prior to the ratification of the Twelfth Amendment in 1804, each member of the Electoral College cast two votes, with no distinction made between votes for president and votes for vice president. The Democratic-Republicans may or may not have officially nominated Jefferson for president through a congressional nominating caucus, but Jefferson was widely regarded as the party's main presidential candidate in the 1796 election. The Democratic-Republicans did not select an official vice presidential candidate. Aaron Burr finished with the second-most electoral votes among individuals affiliated with the party. Because Jefferson won more electoral votes than the second Federalist candidate, Thomas Pinckney, he was elected as vice president.) | Thomas Jefferson* (1743–1826) | Thomas Jefferson | Democratic-Republican | Fmr. Secretary of State | VA | NR | 49.3% | Aaron Burr | John Adams |
| 2 | 1800 (Note: Prior to the ratification of the Twelfth Amendment in 1804, each member of the Electoral College cast two votes, with no distinction made between votes for president and votes for vice president. Thomas Jefferson and the other main Democratic-Republican candidate, Aaron Burr, each won the votes of 73 presidential electors, more than either of the Federalist candidates. Because Jefferson and Burr tied in the electoral vote, the election was decided by a contingent election held in the House of Representatives; Jefferson was elected president and Burr became vice president.) | John Adams* (1735–1826) | John Adams | Federalist | President | MA | NR | 47.1% | Charles C. Pinckney (Note: Prior to the ratification of the Twelfth Amendment in 1804, each member of the Electoral College cast two votes, with no distinction made between the votes for president and votes for vice president. The Federalist congressional nominating caucus nominated a ticket of Adams and Charles C. Pinckney. Though the party did not officially nominate either candidate for president or vice president, most Federalists favored Adams for president and Pinckney for vice president. Adams won 65 electoral votes and Pinckney won 64 electoral votes.) | Thomas Jefferson |
| 3 | 1804 | Charles C. Pinckney (1746–1825) | Charles Cotesworth Pinckney | Federalist | Fmr. Ambassador | SC | NR | 8% | Rufus King | Thomas Jefferson |
| 3 | 1808 | Charles C. Pinckney (1746–1825) | Charles Cotesworth Pinckney | Federalist | Fmr. Ambassador | SC | NR | 26.7% | Rufus King | James Madison |
| 4 | 1812 | DeWitt Clinton (1769–1828) | DeWitt Clinton | Democratic-Republican and Federalist (Note: Clinton was a Northern Democratic-Republican who challenged the incumbent Democratic-Republican president, James Madison, in the general election. Clinton was nominated for president by a legislative caucus of New York Democratic-Republicans, and much of his support came from Democratic-Republicans dissatisfied with Madison's leadership in the War of 1812. The Federalist Party did not officially nominate Clinton, but most Federalist leaders tacitly supported Clinton's candidacy in hopes of defeating Madison.) | Lieutenant Governor and Mayor (Note: In 1812, Clinton simultaneously held the positions of Mayor of New York City and Lieutenant Governor of New York. He had also previously served in the United States Senate.) | NY | NR | 40.8% | Jared Ingersoll | James Madison |
| 5 | 1816 (Note: The Federalists did not nominate a ticket in 1816, though some Federalists were elected to serve as presidential electors. A majority of the Federalist electors cast their presidential vote for King and their vice presidential vote for Howard.) | Rufus King (1755–1827) | Rufus King | Federalist | Senator | NY | NR | 15.4% | John E. Howard | James Monroe |
| 6 | 1824 | Andrew Jackson* (1767–1845) | Andrew Jackson | Democratic-Republican (Note: The Democratic-Republican Party was unable to unite behind a single candidate in 1824. Four Democratic-Republicans received electoral votes in the general election, and, as no candidate won a majority of the electoral vote, the election was decided in a contingent election held in the House of Representatives. John Quincy Adams won that contingent election.) | Senator (Note: Jackson was mostly known as a Major General.) | TN | 41.4%† | 37.9%‡ | John C. Calhoun (Note: In the election 1824, no presidential candidate won a majority of the electoral vote for president, but John C. Calhoun won a majority of the electoral vote for vice president, and thus was elected vice president. Most presidential electors who voted for either Adams or Jackson for president voted for Calhoun for vice president. Similarly, most electors who cast their presidential vote for Clay cast their vice presidential vote for Nathaniel Macon, and most electors who cast their presidential vote for Crawford cast their vice presidential vote for Sanford.) | John Quincy Adams |
| | 1824 | William H. Crawford (1772–1834) | William H. Crawford | Democratic-Republican | Secretary of the Treasury | GA | 11.2% | 15.7% | Nathaniel Macon | John Quincy Adams |
| | 1824 | Henry Clay (1777–1852) | Henry Clay | Democratic-Republican | Speaker of the House | KY | 13.0% | 14.2% | Nathan Sanford | John Quincy Adams |
| 7 | 1828 | John Quincy Adams* (1767–1848) | John Quincy Adams | National Republican | President | MA | 43.7% | 31.8% | Richard Rush | Andrew Jackson |
| 8 | 1832 | Henry Clay (1777–1852) | Henry Clay | National Republican | Senator | KY | 36.7% | 17.1% | John Sergeant | Andrew Jackson |
| 9 | 1836 | William Henry Harrison* (1773–1841) | William Henry Harrison | Whig (Note: The Whigs did not unite around a single candidate in 1836, but the party ran only one presidential candidate per state. 25 states held a popular vote in the 1836 election; Harrison was the Whig candidate in fifteen states, most of which were in the North, White was the Whig candidate in nine states, all of which were in the South, and Daniel Webster was the Whig candidate in Massachusetts. Harrison and White each received electoral votes from multiple states, while Webster and Willie Person Mangum each received electoral votes from a single state (Massachusetts and South Carolina, respectively). In total, the Whigs won 49.1 percent of the popular vote and 41.8 percent of the electoral vote.) | Fmr. Senator | OH | 36.6% | 24.8% | Francis Granger (Note: The Whigs did not select an official vice presidential nominee, and, as in the presidential race, two vice presidential contenders emerged. In most Northern states, the Whigs fielded a ticket of Harrison and Granger, and in most Southern states, the Whigs fielded a ticket of White and Tyler. Granger, Tyler, and two Democrats, Richard Mentor Johnson and William Smith, each won a share of the electoral vote. Because no one candidate won a majority of the electoral vote for vice president, the Senate held a contingent election to select the vice president. In the only contingent election that the Senate has ever held, Johnson defeated Granger.) | Martin Van Buren |
| | 1836 | Hugh Lawson White (1773–1840) | Hugh Lawson White | Whig | Senator | TN | 9.7% | 8.8% | John Tyler | Martin Van Buren |
| 10 | 1840 | Martin Van Buren* (1782–1862) | Martin Van Buren | Democratic | President | NY | 46.9% | 20.4% | Richard M. Johnson (Note: The 1840 Democratic National Convention denied renomination to Vice President Richard Mentor Johnson, and the Democrats failed to officially nominate a vice presidential candidate in 1840. Nonetheless, 48 of the 60 presidential electors who cast their presidential vote for Van Buren cast their vice presidential vote for Johnson. Most of the remaining Van Buren electors cast their vice presidential vote for Littleton Waller Tazewell.) | William Henry Harrison |
| 11 | 1844 | Henry Clay (1777–1852) | Henry Clay | Whig | Fmr. Senator | KY | 48.1% | 38.2% | Theodore Frelinghuysen | James K. Polk |
| 12 | 1848 | Lewis Cass (1782–1866) | Lewis Cass | Democratic | Fmr. Senator | MI | 42.5% | 43.8% | William O. Butler | Zachary Taylor |
| 13 | 1852 | Winfield Scott (1786–1866) | Winfield Scott | Whig | Major General | NJ | 43.9% | 14.2% | William A. Graham | Franklin Pierce |
| 14 | 1856 | John C. Frémont (1813–1890) | John C. Frémont | Republican (Note: After the collapse of the Whig Party in the mid-1850s, the Republican Party and the American Party (the political organization of the Know Nothing movement) emerged as the major challengers to the Democratic Party. By 1856, neither the Republican Party nor the American Party had truly supplanted the Whig Party as the second major political party in the United States. Nonetheless, the American Party is frequently described as a third party. In 1856, the American Party, along with a rump convention of Whigs, nominated a presidential ticket led by former President Millard Fillmore. After the 1856 election, the Republican Party firmly established itself as one of the two major parties alongside the Democratic Party, while the American Party collapsed.) | Fmr. Senator | CA | 33.1% | 38.5% | William L. Dayton | James Buchanan |
| 15 | 1860 | Stephen A. Douglas (1813–1861) | Stephen A. Douglas | Democratic (Note: The Democratic Party fractured along sectional lines in 1860 and held multiple national conventions. The Northern Democrats nominated Douglas and the Southern Democrats nominated Vice President John C. Breckinridge. Many sources include Breckinridge as a third party candidate, but other sources do not.) | Senator | IL | 29.5% | 4% | Herschel V. Johnson | Abraham Lincoln |
| 16 | 1864 | George B. McClellan (1826–1885) | George B. McClellan | Democratic | Major General | NJ | 45.0% | 9% | George H. Pendleton | Abraham Lincoln |
| 17 | 1868 | Horatio Seymour (1810–1886) | Horatio Seymour | Democratic | Fmr. Governor | NY | 47.3% | 27.2% | Francis Preston Blair Jr. | Ulysses S. Grant |
| 18 | 1872 | Horace Greeley (1811–1872) | Horace Greeley | Liberal Republican and Democratic (Note: Greeley and Benjamin Gratz Brown were nominated by the Liberal Republican Party, a splinter group of Republicans. The ticket of Greeley and Brown was later nominated by the 1872 Democratic National Convention, as the Democrats hoped to defeat President Ulysses S. Grant's re-election bid by uniting with the Liberal Republicans.) | Fmr. Representative (Note: Greeley had served in the House of Representatives from December 1848 to March 1849. He was primarily known for his role as editor of the New-York Tribune.) | NY | 43.8% | 18.8% (Note: Greeley died after election day but before the Electoral College cast its votes, and thus did not receive any electoral votes. Greeley would have won 66 electoral votes (18.8% of the 352 electoral votes available) had he been alive when the Electoral College cast its votes. Most of the electoral votes that he would have received had he lived instead went to Democrat Thomas A. Hendricks.) | Benjamin Gratz Brown | Ulysses S. Grant |
| 19 | 1876 | Samuel J. Tilden (1814–1886) | Samuel Tilden | Democratic | Governor | NY | 50.9%† | 49.9% | Thomas A. Hendricks | Rutherford B. Hayes |
| 20 | 1880 | Winfield Scott Hancock (1824–1886) | Winfield Scott Hancock | Democratic | Major General | PA | 48.2% | 42% | William H. English | James A. Garfield |
| 21 | 1884 | James G. Blaine (1830–1893) | James G. Blaine | Republican | Fmr. Secretary of State | ME | 48.3% | 45.4% | John A. Logan | Grover Cleveland |
| 22 | 1888 | Grover Cleveland* (1837–1908) | Grover Cleveland | Democratic | President | NY | 48.7%† | 41.9% | Allen G. Thurman | Benjamin Harrison |
| 23 | 1892 | Benjamin Harrison* (1833–1901) | Benjamin Harrison | Republican | President | IN | 43.0% | 32.7% | Whitelaw Reid | Grover Cleveland |
| 24 | 1896 | William Jennings Bryan (1860–1925) | William Jennings Bryan | Democratic (Note: In 1896, after Bryan won the Democratic presidential nomination, he was also nominated by the Populist Party, a major third party. The Populist vice presidential nominee was Thomas E. Watson. Bryan's running mate on the Democratic ticket, Arthur Sewall, won 149 electoral votes for vice president, while Watson won 27 electoral votes for vice president.) | Fmr. Representative | NE | 46.7% | 39.4% | Arthur Sewall | William McKinley |
| 24 | 1900 | William Jennings Bryan (1860–1925) | William Jennings Bryan | Democratic | Fmr. Representative | NE | 45.5% | 34.7% | Adlai Stevenson I | William McKinley |
| 25 | 1904 | Alton B. Parker (1852–1926) | Alton B. Parker | Democratic | Fmr. state judge (Note: Parker was the Chief Judge of the New York Court of Appeals, the highest court in New York.) | NY | 37.6% | 29.4% | Henry G. Davis | Theodore Roosevelt |
| 26 | 1908 | William Jennings Bryan (1860–1925) | William Jennings Bryan | Democratic | Fmr. Representative | NE | 43.0% | 33.5% | John W. Kern | William Howard Taft |
| 27 | 1912 (Note: After Taft defeated Theodore Roosevelt for the presidential nomination at the 1912 Republican National Convention, supporters of Roosevelt established the Progressive Party, a third party dedicated to progressive ideals. In the 1912 election, Democratic nominee Woodrow Wilson won a plurality of the popular vote and a majority of the electoral vote. Roosevelt won the second highest share of electoral votes and popular votes, while Taft finished in third place in both categories. Roosevelt is the only third-party candidate ever to win the second-most popular votes in a presidential election.) | William Howard Taft* (1857–1930) | William Howard Taft | Republican | President | OH | 23.2% | 1.5% | James S. Sherman (Note: Sherman died on October 30, 1912, and Taft did not name another running mate before the 1912 election was held. After the election, the Republican National Committee designated Nicholas Murray Butler as Taft's running mate for the purposes of the electoral vote, and Butler received eight electoral votes.) | Woodrow Wilson |
| 28 | 1916 | Charles Evans Hughes (1862–1948) | Charles Evans Hughes | Republican | Fmr. Associate Justice | NY | 46.1% | 47.8% | Charles W. Fairbanks | Woodrow Wilson |
| 29 | 1920 | James M. Cox (1870–1957) | James M. Cox | Democratic | Governor | OH | 34.1% | 23.9% | Franklin D. Roosevelt | Warren G. Harding |
| 30 | 1924 | John W. Davis (1873–1955) | John W. Davis | Democratic | Fmr. Ambassador | WV | 28.8% | 25.6% | Charles W. Bryan | Calvin Coolidge |
| 31 | 1928 | Al Smith (1873–1944) | Al Smith | Democratic | Governor | NY | 40.8% | 16.4% | Joseph T. Robinson | Herbert Hoover |
| 32 | 1932 | Herbert Hoover* (1874–1964) | Herbert Hoover | Republican | President | CA | 39.7% | 11.1% | Charles Curtis | Franklin D. Roosevelt |
| 33 | 1936 | Alf Landon (1887–1987) | Alf Landon | Republican | Governor | KS | 36.5% | 1.5% | Frank Knox | Franklin D. Roosevelt |
| 34 | 1940 | Wendell Willkie (1892–1944) | Wendell Willkie | Republican | None (Note: Willkie was an attorney who had served as the president of the Commonwealth & Southern Corporation in the 1930s.) | NY | 44.8% | 15.4% | Charles L. McNary | Franklin D. Roosevelt |
| 35 | 1944 | Thomas E. Dewey (1902–1971) | Thomas E. Dewey | Republican | Governor | NY | 45.9% | 18.6% | John W. Bricker | Franklin D. Roosevelt |
| 35 | 1948 | Thomas E. Dewey (1902–1971) | Thomas E. Dewey | Republican | Governor | NY | 45.1% | 35.6% | Earl Warren | Harry S. Truman |
| 36 | 1952 | Adlai Stevenson II (1900–1965) | Adlai Stevenson II | Democratic | Governor | IL | 44.3% | 16.8% | John Sparkman | Dwight D. Eisenhower |
| 36 | 1956 | Adlai Stevenson II (1900–1965) | Adlai Stevenson II | Democratic | Fmr. Governor | IL | 42.0% | 13.7% | Estes Kefauver | Dwight D. Eisenhower |
| 37 | 1960 | Richard Nixon* (1913–1994) | Richard Nixon | Republican | Vice President | CA | 49.6% | 40.8% | Henry Cabot Lodge Jr. | John F. Kennedy |
| 38 | 1964 | Barry Goldwater (1909–1998) | Barry Goldwater | Republican | Senator | AZ | 38.5% | 9.7% | William E. Miller | Lyndon B. Johnson |
| 39 | 1968 | Hubert Humphrey (1911–1978) | Hubert Humphrey | Democratic | Vice President | MN | 42.7% | 35.5% | Edmund Muskie | Richard Nixon |
| 40 | 1972 | George McGovern (1922–2012) | George McGovern | Democratic | Senator | SD | 37.5% | 3.2% | Sargent Shriver (Note: The 1972 Democratic National Convention selected Thomas Eagleton as the party's vice presidential nominee, but Eagleton dropped out of the race after it was publicly disclosed that he had undergone electroconvulsive therapy in order to treat depression. Shriver replaced Eagleton on the Democratic ticket.) | Richard Nixon |
| 41 | 1976 | Gerald Ford* (1913–2006) | Gerald Ford | Republican | President | MI | 48.0% | 44.6% | Bob Dole | Jimmy Carter |
| 42 | 1980 | Jimmy Carter* (1924–2024) | Jimmy Carter | Democratic | President | GA | 41.0% | 9.1% | Walter Mondale | Ronald Reagan |
| 43 | 1984 | Walter Mondale (1928–2021) | Walter Mondale | Democratic | Fmr. Vice President | MN | 40.6% | 2.4% | Geraldine Ferraro | Ronald Reagan |
| 44 | 1988 | Michael Dukakis (born 1933) | Michael Dukakis | Democratic | Governor | MA | 45.7% | 20.6% | Lloyd Bentsen | George H. W. Bush |
| 45 | 1992 | George H. W. Bush* (1924–2018) | George H. W. Bush | Republican | President | TX | 37.5% | 31.2% | Dan Quayle | Bill Clinton |
| 46 | 1996 | Bob Dole (1923–2021) | Bob Dole | Republican | Fmr. Senator | KS | 40.7% | 29.6% | Jack Kemp | Bill Clinton |
| 47 | 2000 | Al Gore (born 1948) | Al Gore | Democratic | Vice President | TN | 48.4%† | 49.4% | Joe Lieberman | George W. Bush |
| 48 | 2004 | John Kerry (born 1943) | John Kerry | Democratic | Senator | MA | 48.3% | 46.7% | John Edwards | George W. Bush |
| 49 | 2008 | John McCain (1936–2018) | John McCain | Republican | Senator | AZ | 45.7% | 32.2% | Sarah Palin | Barack Obama |
| 50 | 2012 | Mitt Romney (born 1947) | Mitt Romney | Republican | Fmr. Governor | MA | 47.2% | 38.3% | Paul Ryan | Barack Obama |
| 51 | 2016 | Hillary Clinton (born 1947) | Hillary Clinton | Democratic | Fmr. Secretary of State | NY | 48.2%† | 42.2% | Tim Kaine | Donald Trump |
| 52 | 2020 | Donald Trump* (born 1946) | Donald Trump | Republican | President | FL | 46.8% | 43.1% | Mike Pence | Joe Biden |
| 53 | 2024 | Kamala Harris (born 1964) | Kamala Harris | Democratic | Vice President | CA | 48.3% | 42% | Tim Walz | Donald Trump |

=== Major third parties and independents ===
These third-party and independent candidates won at least ten percent of the electoral vote or at least ten percent of the popular vote.

- * indicates that the candidate served as the president of the United States at some point in their career
- † indicates that the candidate finished with the second highest share of the popular vote
- ‡ indicates that the candidate finished with the second highest share of the electoral vote
- PV% indicates the share of the popular vote won by that candidate
- EV% indicates the share of the electoral vote won by that candidate

Free Soil American Southern Democratic Constitutional Union Progressive (1912) Progressive (1924) American Independent Independent
| Election | Candidate | | | | | Vote | | Running mate |
| Election | Candidate (Birth–death) | | Party | Office at time of election | Home state | PV% | EV% | Running mate |
|---|---|---|---|---|---|---|---|---|
| 1848 | Martin Van Buren* (1782–1862) | Martin Van Buren | Free Soil | Fmr. President | NY | 10.1% | 0% | Charles F. Adams Sr. |
| 1856 | Millard Fillmore* (1800–1874) | Millard Fillmore | American | Fmr. President | NY | 21.5% | 2.7% | Andrew J. Donelson |
| 1860 | John C. Breckinridge (1821–1875) | John C. Breckinridge | Southern Democratic | Vice President | KY | 18.2% | 23.8%‡ | Joseph Lane |
| 1860 | John Bell (1796–1869) | John Bell | Constitutional Union | Fmr. Senator | TN | 12.6% | 12.9% | Edward Everett |
| 1912 | Theodore Roosevelt* (1858–1919) | Theodore Roosevelt | Progressive (Note: Though the Progressive Party of 1912 and the Progressive Party of 1924 shared names and an association with the progressive movement, they were two distinct political parties.) | Fmr. President | NY | 27.4%† | 16.6%‡ | Hiram Johnson |
| 1924 | Robert La Follette (1855–1925) | Robert La Follette | Progressive | Senator | WI | 16.6% | 2.4% | Burton K. Wheeler |
| 1968 | George Wallace (1919–1998) | George Wallace | American Independent | Fmr. Governor | AL | 13.5% | 8.6% | Curtis LeMay |
| 1992 | Ross Perot (Note: Perot also ran in the 1996 presidential election with Pat Choate as his running mate, receiving 8.4% of the popular vote.) (1930–2019) | Ross Perot | Independent | None (Note: Perot was a businessman who was primarily known as the founder of Electronic Data Systems.) | TX | 18.9% | 0% | James Stockdale |

== See also ==
- List of presidents of the United States
- List of United States presidential candidates
- List of unsuccessful major party candidates for Vice President of the United States
- List of people who received an electoral vote in the United States Electoral College
- List of United States Electoral College results
- Lists of fictional presidents of the United States
- Alternate Presidents
