= 1996 United States presidential election =

Re-election of Bill Clinton

- November 5, 1996

538 members of the Electoral College 270 electoral votes needed to win
- Turnout: 51.7% (▼6.4 pp)

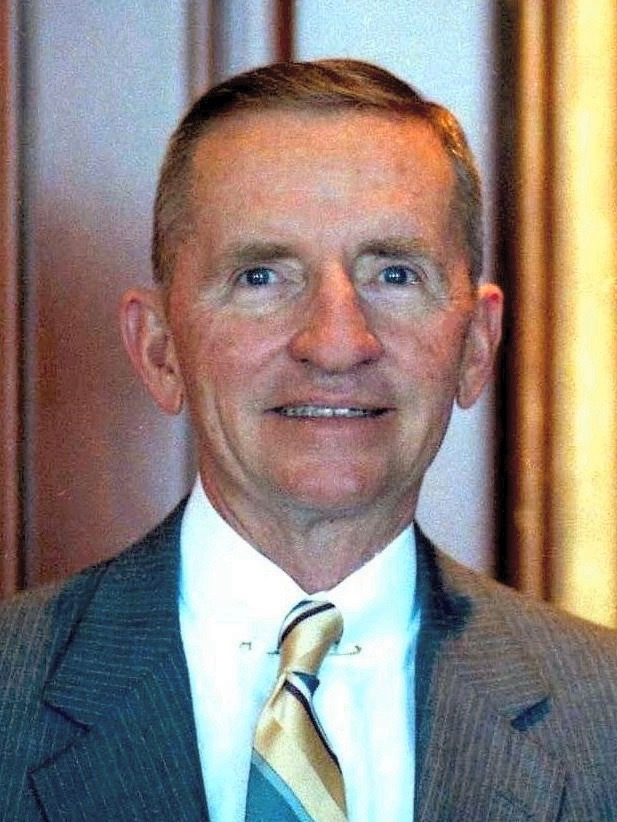
Nominee	Bill Clinton	Bob Dole	Ross Perot
Party	Democratic	Republican	Reform
Home state	Arkansas	Kansas	Texas
Running mate	Al Gore	Jack Kemp	Pat Choate (Note: On the California, Indiana, Iowa, Kansas, Louisiana, Maine, Maryland, Missouri, Montana, Oregon, South Dakota, Tennessee, and Texas election ballots, James Campbell of California, Perot's former boss at IBM, was listed as a stand-in vice-presidential candidate.)
Electoral vote	379	159	0
States carried	31 + DC	19	0
Popular vote	47,402,357	39,198,755	8,085,402
Percentage	49.2%	40.7%	8.4%
- Presidential election results map. Blue denotes states won by Clinton/Gore and red denotes those won by Dole/Kemp. Numbers indicate electoral votes cast by each state and the District of Columbia.
President before election
Bill Clinton
Democratic
Elected President
Bill Clinton
Democratic

A presidential election was held in the United States on November 5, 1996. Incumbent Democratic president Bill Clinton and his running mate, incumbent vice president Al Gore, were re-elected to a second term; they defeated the Republican ticket of former Senate majority leader Bob Dole and former secretary of housing and urban development Jack Kemp, and the Reform ticket of businessman Ross Perot and economist Pat Choate.

Clinton and Gore were re-nominated by their party with no difficulty. Meanwhile, numerous Republican candidates entered the competitive primaries, with Dole considered the early frontrunner. Dole clinched the nomination after defeating challenges by publisher Steve Forbes and paleoconservative leader Pat Buchanan. Dole's running mate was Jack Kemp, a former New York congressman and football player who had served as the housing secretary under President George H. W. Bush. Ross Perot, who had won 18.9% of the popular vote as an independent candidate in 1992, ran as the candidate of the Reform Party. Perot received less media attention in 1996 and was excluded from the presidential debates.

Clinton's chances of winning were initially considered slim in the middle of his term, as his party had lost both the House of Representatives and the Senate in 1994 for the first time in decades. He was able to regain ground as the economy began to recover from the early 1990s recession with a relatively stable world stage. Clinton tied Dole to Newt Gingrich, the arch-conservative Republican speaker of the House, and expressed concern that Republicans would increase the deficit and slash spending on popular programs like Social Security and Medicare. Dole promised an across-the-board 15% reduction in federal income taxes and labeled Clinton as a "spoiled" Baby Boomer who "never grew up" and "never sacrificed." Dole's age was a persistent issue in the election, and gaffes by Dole exacerbated the issue for his campaign.

On election day, Clinton defeated Dole by a wide margin, winning 379 electors to Dole's 159 and taking 49.2% of the national popular vote to Dole's 40.7%. As in 1992, Perot's strong candidacy held both major party candidates below 50% nationwide. As of 2026, he remains the last third party or independent candidate to receive more than 5% of the popular vote. As of 2024, this marked the last election in which the Democratic nominee won Arkansas, Kentucky, Louisiana, Missouri, Tennessee, and West Virginia; it was also the last election in which the Democratic nominee won Arizona until 2020.

== Background ==
In 1995, the Republican Party was riding high on the significant gains made in the 1994 midterm elections. In those races, the Republicans, led by whip Newt Gingrich, captured the majority of seats in the House for the first time in forty years and the majority of seats in the Senate for the first time in eight years. Gingrich became speaker of the House, while Bob Dole was elevated to Senate majority leader.

The Republicans of the 104th Congress pursued an ambitious agenda, highlighted by their Contract with America, but were often forced to compromise with Clinton, who wielded veto power. A budget impasse between Congress and the Clinton administration eventually resulted in a government shutdown. Clinton, meanwhile, was praised for signing the GOP's welfare reform, and other notable bills, but was forced to abandon his own health care plan.

== Nominations ==
=== Democratic Party ===
Democratic Party (United States) 1996 Democratic Party ticket
Bill Clinton	Al Gore
for President	for Vice President
42nd President of the United States (1993–2001)	45th Vice President of the United States (1993–2001)
Campaign

With the advantage of incumbency, Bill Clinton's path to renomination by the Democratic Party was uneventful. At the 1996 Democratic National Convention, Clinton and incumbent Vice President Al Gore were renominated with token opposition. Formerly incarcerated fringe candidate Lyndon LaRouche won a few Arkansas delegates who were barred from the convention. Jimmy Griffin, former Mayor of Buffalo, New York, mounted a brief campaign but withdrew after a poor showing in the New Hampshire primary. Former Pennsylvania governor Bob Casey contemplated a challenge to Clinton, but health problems forced Casey to abandon a bid.

Clinton easily won primaries nationwide, with margins consistently higher than 80%.

Popular primaries vote:

- Bill Clinton (inc.) – 9,730,184 (88.5%)
- Lyndon LaRouche – 597,081 (5.4%)
- Unpledged – 423,265 (3.8%)

Convention tally:

- Bill Clinton (inc.) – 4,277
- Not voting – 12

=== Republican Party ===
Republican Party (United States) 1996 Republican Party ticket
Bob Dole	Jack Kemp
for President	for Vice President
U.S. Senator from Kansas (1969–1996)	9th U.S. Secretary of Housing and Urban Development (1989–1993)
Campaign

==== Withdrawn candidates ====
Candidates in this section are sorted by popular vote from the primaries
Pat Buchanan	Steve Forbes	Lamar Alexander	Richard Lugar	Phil Gramm
White House Communications Director (1985–1987)	Publisher and editor-in-chief of Forbes magazine (1990–)	United States Secretary of Education (1991–1993)	United States Senator from Indiana (1977–2013)	United States Senator from Texas (1985–2002)
Campaign				
LN: August 15; 3,184,943 votes	W: March 14; 1,751,187 votes	W: March 9; 495,590 votes	W: March 9; 127,111 votes	

==== Candidates gallery ====
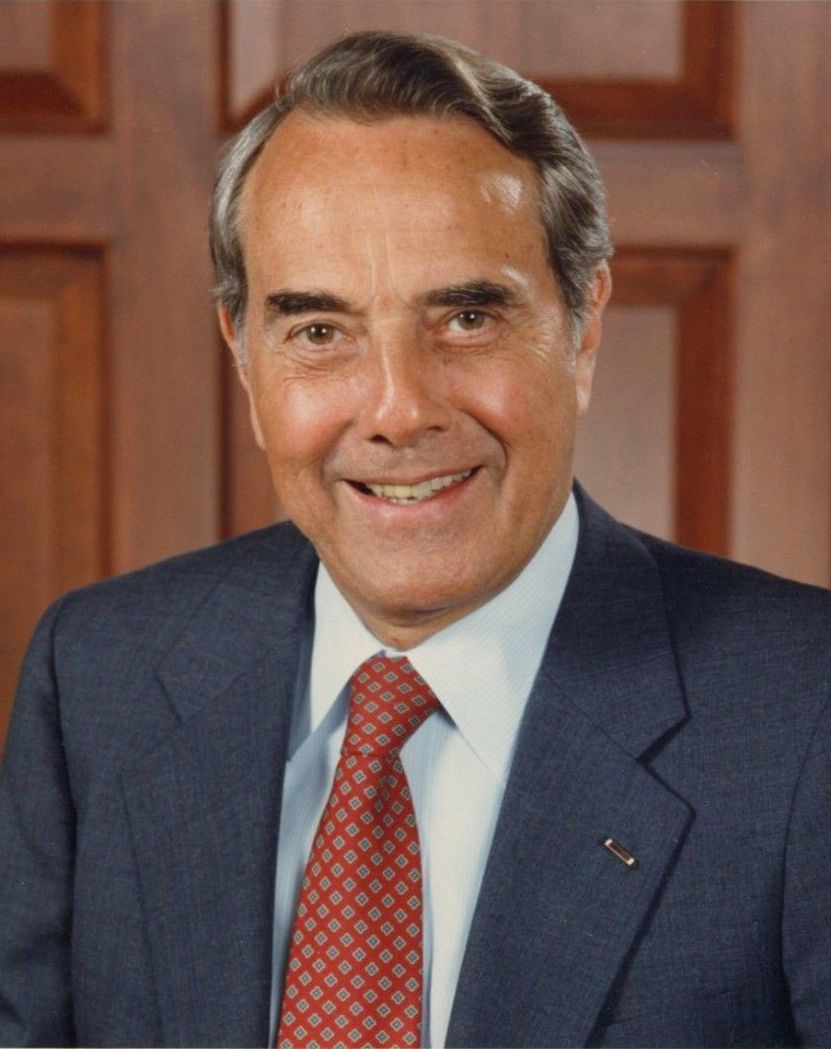
Senator
Bob Dole
from Kansas

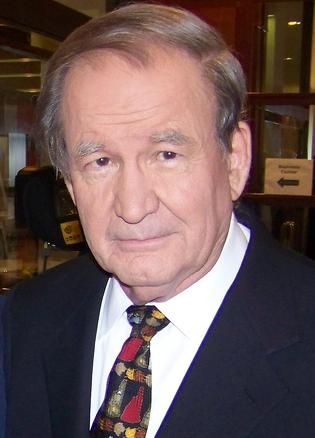
Conservative columnist
Pat Buchanan
from Virginia

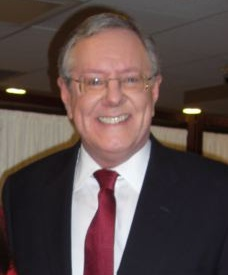
Newspaper and magazine publisher
Steve Forbes
from New York

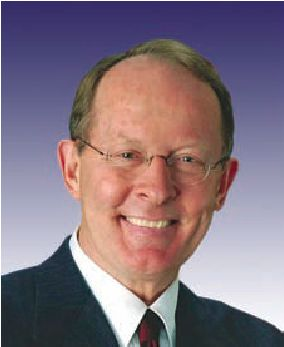
Former Governor
Lamar Alexander
of Tennessee

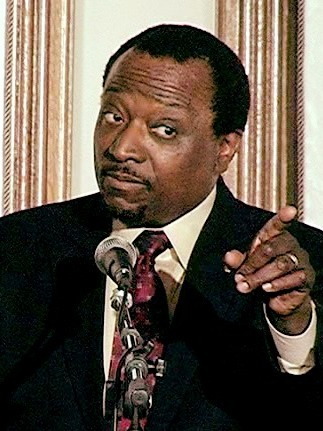
Former U.S. ECOSOC Ambassador
Alan Keyes from Maryland

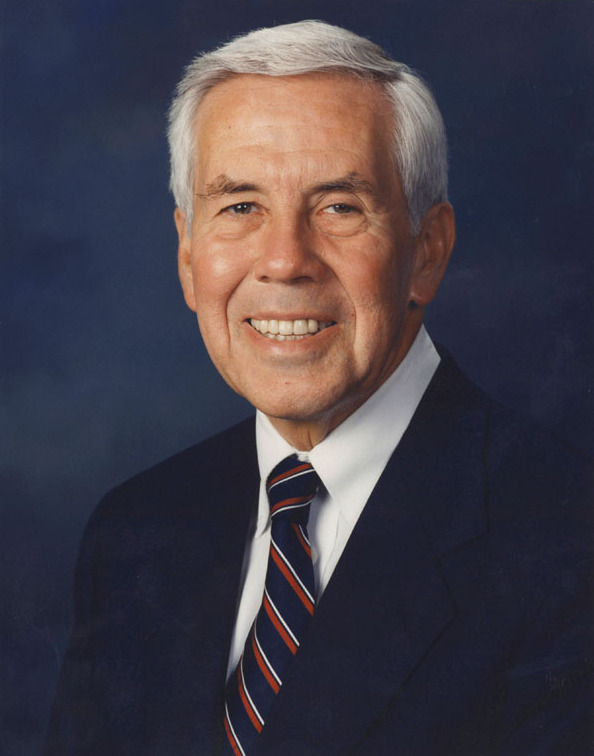
Senator
Richard Lugar
from Indiana

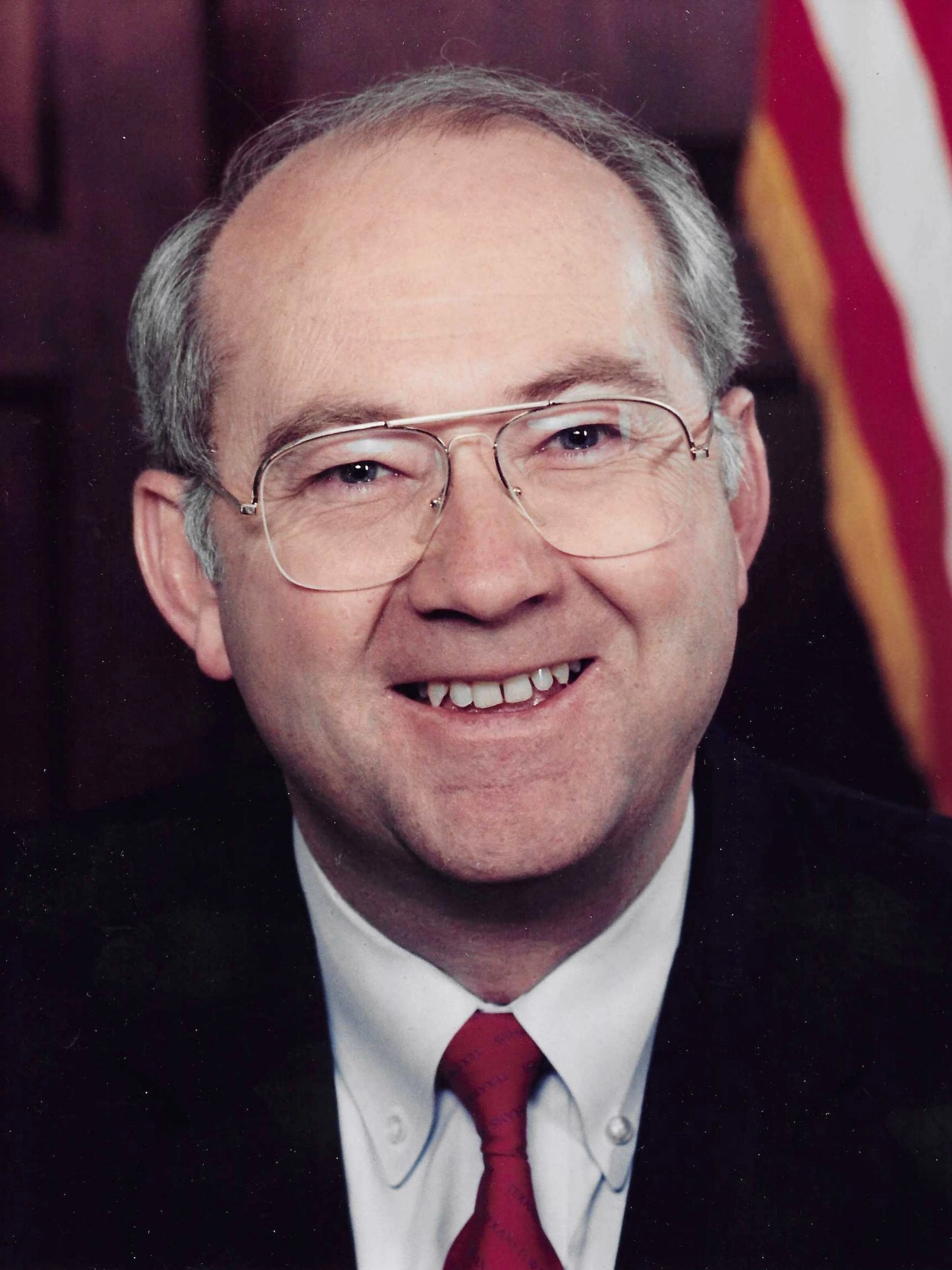
Senator
Phil Gramm
from Texas

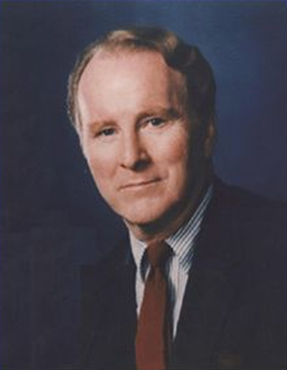
Representative
Bob Dornan
from California

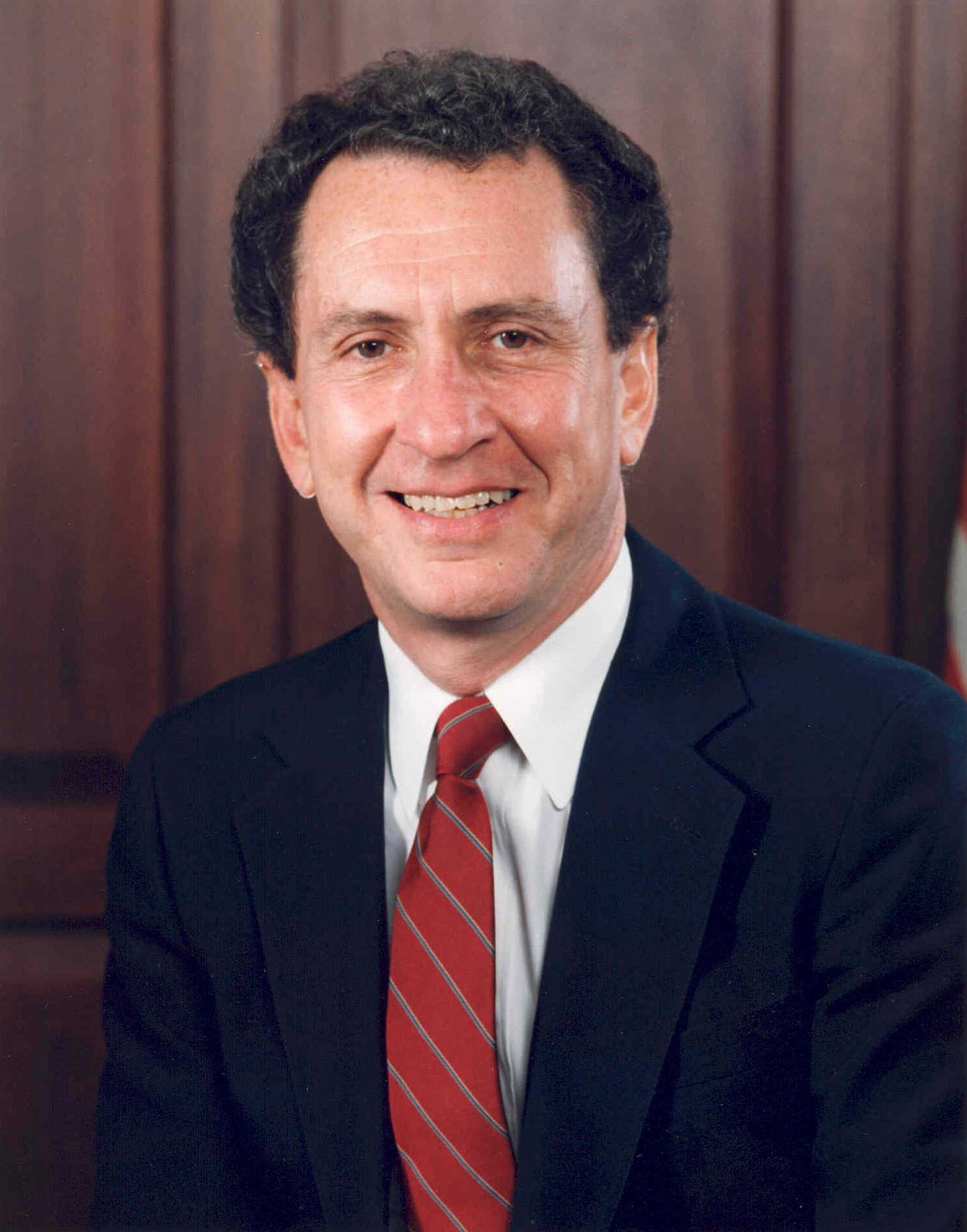
Senator
Arlen Specter
from Pennsylvania

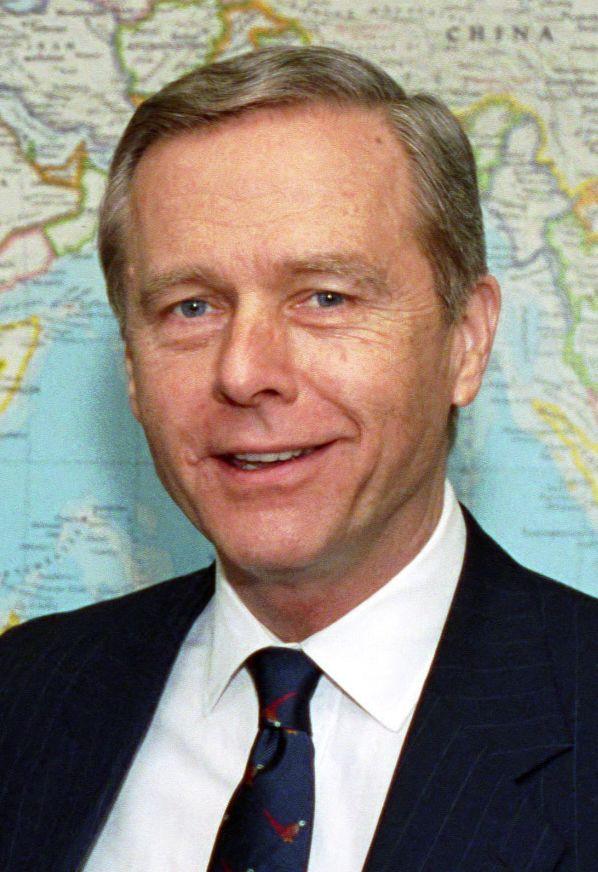
Governor
Pete Wilson
of California

A number of Republican candidates entered the field to challenge the incumbent Democratic president, Bill Clinton.

The fragmented field of candidates debated issues such as a flat tax and other tax cut proposals, and a return to supply-side economic policies popularized by Ronald Reagan. More attention was drawn to the race by the budget stalemate in 1995 between Congress and the president, which caused temporary shutdowns and slowdowns in many areas of federal government service.

Former Secretary of Labor Lynn Martin of Illinois, who served in the United States House of Representatives from Illinois's 16th District and was the 1990 Republican U.S. Senate nominee losing to incumbent Paul Simon conducted a bid for most of 1995, but withdrew before the Iowa caucuses as polls showed her languishing far behind. She participated in a number of primary presidential debates before withdrawing. Martin's predecessor in Congress, John Anderson, had made first a Republican, then independent, presidential bid in 1980. Also, Simon, who defeated Martin for the U.S. Senate, had run for president as a Democrat in 1988.

Former U.S. Army General and future Secretary of State Colin Powell was widely courted as a potential Republican nominee. However, on November 8, 1995, Powell announced that he would not seek the nomination. Former and future Defense Secretary Donald Rumsfeld formed a presidential campaign exploratory committee, but declined to formally enter the race. Former Secretary of State James A. Baker III and former Secretary of Education William Bennett both flirted with bids, and both even set up exploratory committees for a number of months, but both finally declared within days of each other that they would not run. Former Secretary of Defense and future Vice President of the United States Dick Cheney was touted by many as a possible candidate for the presidency, but he declared his intentions not to run in early 1995.

==== Primaries and convention ====
Ahead of the 1996 primary contest, Republican Leader of the United States Senate and former vice-presidential candidate Bob Dole was seen as the most likely winner. However, Steve Forbes finished first in Delaware and Arizona while paleoconservative firebrand Pat Buchanan managed early victories in Alaska and Louisiana, in addition to a strong second place in the Iowa caucuses and a surprising victory in the small but key New Hampshire primary. Buchanan's New Hampshire win alarmed the Republican "establishment" sufficiently as to provoke prominent Republicans to quickly coalesce around Dole, and Dole won every primary starting with North and South Dakota. Dole resigned his Senate seat on June 11 and the Republican National Convention formally nominated Dole on August 15, 1996, for president.

Popular primaries vote:

- Bob Dole – 8,427,601 (59.2%)
- Pat Buchanan – 3,021,935 (21.2%)
- Steve Forbes – 1,425,998 (10.0%)
- Lamar Alexander – 495,590 (3.5%)
- Alan Keyes – 449,536 (3.2%)
- Richard Lugar – 127,111 (0.9%)
- Unpledged – 123,765 (0.9%)
- Phil Gramm – 71,457 (0.5%)
- Bob Dornan – 42,141 (0.3%)
- Morry Taylor – 21,180 (0.1%)

Convention tally:

- Bob Dole – 1928
- Pat Buchanan – 43
- Phil Gramm – 2
- Alan Keyes – 1
- Robert Bork – 1
- Not voting – 15

Former Representative and Housing Secretary Jack Kemp was nominated by acclamation for vice president, the following day. This was the only Republican ticket between 1980 and 2004 that did not include a member of the Bush family.

=== Reform Party nomination ===
1996 Reform Party ticket
Ross Perot	Pat Choate
for President	for Vice President
President and CEO of Perot Systems (1988–2009)	Economist
Campaign

Ross Perot was on the ballot in every state.

==== Candidates gallery ====
Party founder Ross Perot from Texas

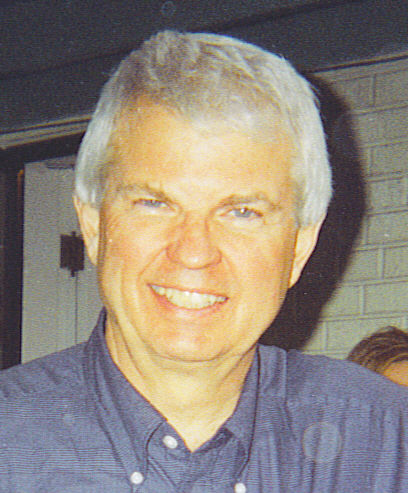
Former Governor Richard Lamm of Colorado

The United States Reform Party had great difficulty in finding a candidate willing to run in the general election. Lowell Weicker, Tim Penny, David Boren and Richard Lamm were among those who toyed with the notion of seeking its presidential nomination, though all but Lamm decided against it; Lamm had himself come close to withdrawing his name from consideration. Lamm designated Ed Zschau as his vice presidential candidate.

Ultimately, the Reform Party nominated its founder Ross Perot from Texas in its first election as an official political party. Although Perot easily won the nomination, his victory at the party's national convention led to a schism as supporters of Lamm accused him of rigging the vote to prevent them from casting their ballots. This faction walked out of the national convention and eventually formed their own group, the American Reform Party, and attempted to convince Lamm to run as an independent in the general election; Lamm declined, pointing out a promise he made before running that he would respect the Party's final decision.

Economist Pat Choate was nominated for vice president.

=== Minor parties and independents ===
Parties in this section obtained ballot access in enough states to theoretically obtain the minimum number of electoral votes needed to win the election. Individuals included in this section completed one or more of the following actions: received, or formally announced their candidacy for, the presidential nomination of a third party; formally announced intention to run as an independent candidate and obtained enough ballot access to win the election; filed as a third party or non-affiliated candidate with the FEC (for other than exploratory purposes). Within each party, candidates are listed alphabetically by surname.

Minor party candidates, 1996
Libertarian	Green	Natural Law	U.S. Taxpayers'
Harry Browne	Ralph Nader	John Hagelin	Howard Phillips
Investment analyst	Author and consumer advocate	Scientist and researcher	Conservative political activist

==== Libertarian Party nomination ====
Harry Browne was on the ballot in every state.

Libertarian candidates:

- Harry Browne, writer and investment analyst from Tennessee
- Jeffrey Diket, political activist from Louisiana
- Douglas J. Ohmen, political activist from California
- Irwin Schiff, writer and prominent figure in the tax protester movement from Nevada
- Rick Tompkins, former candidate for senator from Arizona

The Libertarian Party nominated free-market writer and investment analyst Harry Browne from Tennessee, and selected Jo Jorgensen from South Carolina as his running mate. Browne and Jorgensen drew 485,798 votes (0.5% of the popular vote).

Balloting
Presidential ballot	1st
Harry Browne	416
Rick Tompkins	74
None	61
Irwin Schiff	32
Douglas J. Ohmen	20
Jeffrey Diket	1
Jo Jorgensen	1

==== Green Party nomination ====
Ralph Nader was on the ballot in 21 states (225 electoral votes). States with a lighter shade are those in which he was an official write-in candidate.

The Green Party of the United States drafted Ralph Nader of Connecticut as a candidate for president of the United States on the Green Party ticket. He was not formally nominated by the Green Party USA, which was, at the time, the largest national Green group; instead, he was nominated independently by various state Green parties (in some areas, he appeared on the ballot as an independent). Nader vowed to spend only $5,000 in his election campaign (to avoid having to file a financial statement with the FEC). Winona LaDuke, a Native American activist and economist from Wisconsin, was named as his running mate. In Iowa and Vermont, Anne Goeke was listed as Nader's running mate; in New Jersey it was Madelyn Hoffman and in New York it was Muriel Tillinghast.

Nader and his running mates drew 685,128 votes (0.71% of the popular vote).

==== Natural Law Party nomination ====
John Hagelin was on the ballot in 43 states (463 electoral Votes). States with a lighter shade are those in which he was an official write-in candidate.

The Natural Law Party for a second time nominated scientist and researcher John Hagelin for president and Mike Tompkins for vice president. The party platform included preventive health care, sustainable agriculture and renewable energy technologies. During his campaigns, Hagelin favored abortion rights without public financing, campaign finance law reform, improved gun control, a flat tax, the eradication of PACs, a ban on soft money contributions, and school vouchers, and was a believer in "yogic flying."

Hagelin and Tompkins drew 113,671 votes (0.1% of the popular vote).

==== U.S. Taxpayers' Party nomination ====
Howard Phillips was on the ballot in 38 states (414 electoral votes). States with a lighter shade are those in which he was an official write-in candidate.

The U.S. Taxpayers' Party had run its first presidential ticket in 1992, headed by Howard Phillips, who had failed to find any prominent conservative willing to take the mantle. In 1996 the situation ultimately proved the same, though Pat Buchanan for a time was widely speculated to be planning on bolting to the Taxpayers' Party should the expected Republican nominee, Senator Bob Dole, name a pro-choice running mate. When Jack Kemp, who opposed abortion, was tapped for the position Buchanan agreed to endorse the Republican ticket. Phillips again led the Taxpayers' ticket, with Herbert Titus nominated for the vice presidency.

Phillips and Titus drew 182,820 votes (0.2% of the popular vote).

== General election ==
=== Campaign ===
Without meaningful primary opposition, Clinton was able to focus on the general election early, while Dole was forced to move to the right and spend his campaign reserves fighting off challengers. Political adviser Dick Morris urged Clinton to raise huge sums of campaign funds via soft money for an unprecedented early TV blitz of swing states promoting Clinton's agenda and record. As a result, Clinton could run a campaign through the summer defining his opponent as an aged conservative far from the mainstream before Dole was in a position to respond. Compared to the 50-year-old Clinton, then 73-year-old Dole appeared especially old and frail, as illustrated by an embarrassing fall off a stage during a campaign event in Chico, California. Dole further enhanced this contrast on September 18 when he made a reference to a no-hitter thrown the day before by Hideo Nomo of the "Brooklyn Dodgers", a team that had left Brooklyn for Los Angeles 38 years earlier. A few days later Dole would make a joke about the remark by saying, "And I'd like to congratulate the St. Louis Cardinals on winning the N.L. Central. Notice I said the St. Louis Cardinals, not the St. Louis Browns." (The Browns had left St. Louis after the 1954 season to become the Baltimore Orioles.)

Dole chose to focus on Clinton (and the many Baby Boomer members of Clinton's administration) as representing a new "corps of the elite who never grew up, never did anything real, never sacrificed, never suffered and never learned." Dole said, "My generation won [World War II], and we may need to be called to service one last time." Although his message won appeal with older voters, surveys found that his age was widely held as a liability and his frequent allusions to WWII and the Great Depression in speeches and campaign ads "unappealing" to younger voters. To prove that he was still healthy and active, Dole released all of his medical records to the public and published photographs of himself running on a treadmill. After the falling incident in California, he joked that he "was trying to do that new Democratic dance, the macarena."

The Clinton campaign avoided mentioning Dole's age directly, choosing to confront it in more subtle ways such as the slogan "Building Bridges to the Future" in contrast to the Republican candidate's frequent remarks that he was a "bridge to the past", before the social upheavals of the 1960s. Clinton, without actually calling Dole old, questioned the age of his ideas.

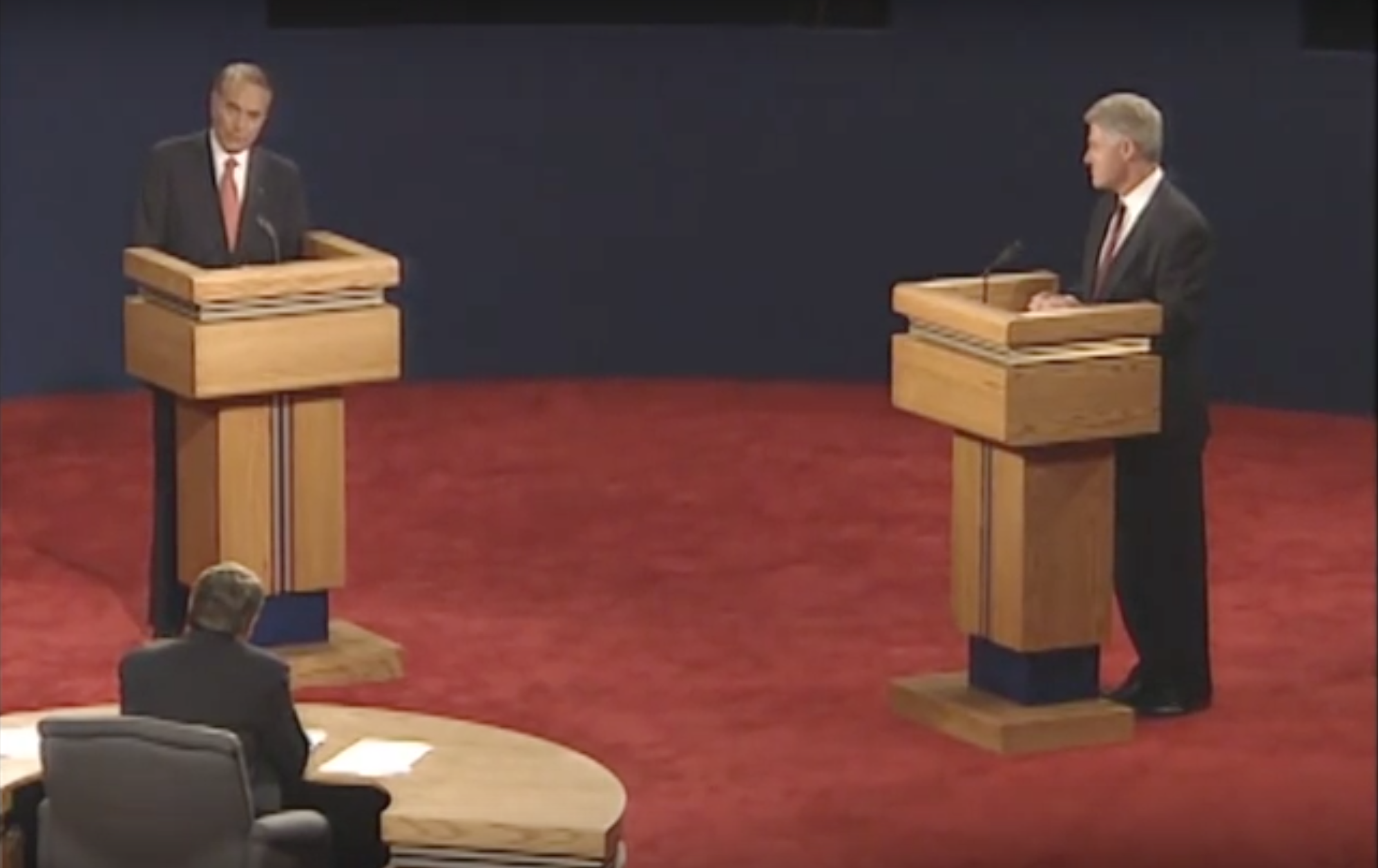
Dole (left) and Clinton (right) at the first presidential debate on October 6, 1996, at The Bushnell Center for the Performing Arts in Hartford, Connecticut

With respect to the issues, Dole promised a 15% across-the-board reduction in income tax rates and made former congressman and supply side advocate Jack Kemp his running mate. Bill Clinton framed the narrative against Dole early, painting him as a mere clone of House speaker Newt Gingrich, warning America that Dole would work in concert with the Republican Congress to slash popular social programs, like Medicare and Social Security, dubbed by Clinton as "Dole-Gingrich". Dole's tax-cut plan found itself under attack from the White House, who said it would "blow a hole in the deficit," which had been cut nearly in half during his opponent's term.

The televised debates featured only Dole and Clinton, locking out Perot and the other minor candidates from the discussion. Perot, who had been allowed to participate in the 1992 debates, eventually took his case to court, seeking damages from not being in the debate, as well as citing unfair coverage from the major media outlets.

In a first for either major party in a presidential election, both the Clinton and Dole campaigns had official websites. Dole invited viewers to visit his homepage at the end of the first debate.

Throughout the campaign, Clinton maintained leads in the polls over Dole and Perot, generally by large margins. In October, Republican National Committee "operatives urg[ed] their party's Congressional candidates to cut loose from Bob Dole and press voters to maintain a Republican majority" and spent $4 million on advertising in targeted districts.

=== Presidential debates ===
Three debates, organized by the Commission on Presidential Debates, took place—two between the presidential candidates and one between the vice presidential candidates:

Debates among candidates for the 1996 U.S. presidential election
No.	Date	Host	Location	Moderators	Participants	Viewership (millions)
P1	Sunday, October 6, 1996	Bushnell Center for the Performing Arts	Hartford, Connecticut	Jim Lehrer	President Bill Clinton; Senator Bob Dole	46.1
VP	Wednesday, October 9, 1996	Mahaffey Theater	St. Petersburg, Florida	Jim Lehrer	Vice President Al Gore; Secretary Jack Kemp	26.6
P2	Wednesday, October 16, 1996	University of San Diego	San Diego, California	Jim Lehrer	President Bill Clinton; Senator Bob Dole	36.6

Sites of the 1996 general election debates

=== Campaign donations controversy ===
In late September 1995, questions arose regarding the Democratic National Committee's fund-raising practices. In February the following year, China's alleged role in the campaign finance controversy first gained public attention after The Washington Post published a story stating that a U.S. Department of Justice investigation had discovered evidence that agents of China sought to direct contributions from foreign sources to the DNC before the 1996 presidential campaign. The paper wrote that intelligence information had shown the Chinese Embassy in Washington, D.C. was used for coordinating contributions to the DNC in violation of U.S. law forbidding non-American citizens from giving monetary donations to U.S. politicians and political parties. Seventeen people were eventually convicted for fraud or for funneling Asian funds into the U.S. elections.

One of the more notable events learned involved Vice President Al Gore and a fund-raising event held at Hsi Lai Temple in Hacienda Heights, California. The Temple event was organized by DNC fund-raisers John Huang and Maria Hsia. It is illegal under U.S. law for religious organizations to donate money to politicians or political groups due to their tax-exempt status. The U.S. Justice Department alleged Hsia facilitated $100,000 (~$189,231 in 2025) in illegal contributions to the 1996 Clinton-Gore re-election campaign through her efforts at the Temple. Hsia was eventually convicted by a jury in March 2000. The DNC eventually returned the money donated by the Temple's monks and nuns. Twelve nuns and employees of the Temple refused to answer questions by pleading the Fifth Amendment when they were subpoenaed to testify before Congress in 1997.

== Results ==
On election day, President Clinton won a decisive victory over Dole, marking the first time since Franklin D. Roosevelt's three re-elections in 1936, 1940, and 1944 that the Democratic nominee won re-election. In the popular vote, Clinton out-polled Dole by over 8.2 million votes. The Electoral College map did not change much from the previous election, with the Democratic incumbent winning 379 votes to the Republican ticket's 159.

Since Dole was the vice presidential nominee in the 1976 election, Dole's 1996 loss made him the only unsuccessful major party nominee for both president and vice president in the history of the United States. Although Clinton's margin of victory in the popular vote was slightly greater than that of George H. W. Bush in 1988, Dole won more states than Bush did in 1992 in part due to Clinton's relatively poor performance in areas of low population density, a precursor of the trend where future Democratic contenders for the presidency perform very well in populous metropolitan areas but vastly under-perform in rural counties. In the West, Dole managed to narrowly win Colorado and Montana (both had voted for Clinton four years earlier), while Clinton became the first Democrat to win Arizona since Harry S. Truman in 1948. In the South, Clinton won Florida, a state he had failed to win in 1992, but lost Georgia, a state that he had carried. The election helped to cement Democratic presidential control in California, Vermont, Maine, Illinois, New Jersey and Connecticut; all went on to vote Democratic in every subsequent presidential election after having voted Republican in the five prior to 1992. 1996 marked the first time that Vermont voted for a Democrat in two successive elections. Pennsylvania and Michigan both voted Democratic, and would remain in the Democratic presidential fold until 2016 and again in 2024.

Reform Party nominee Ross Perot won approximately 8% of the popular vote. His vote total was less than half of his performance in 1992. The 1996 national exit poll showed that just as in 1992, Perot drew supporters from Clinton and Dole equally. In polls directed at Perot voters as to who would be a second choice, Clinton consistently held substantial leads. Perot's best showing was in states that tended to strongly favor either Clinton (such as Maine) or Dole (particularly Montana, though the margin of victory there was much closer). Perot once again received his lowest amount of support in the South.

Although Clinton is a native of Arkansas and his running mate hailed from Tennessee, the Democratic ticket carried just four of the eleven states of the former Confederacy. Of those four, only Florida and Georgia have voted Democratic in any election since. As such, Clinton's 1992 run was tied for the weakest performance in the region by a nationally successful Democratic presidential nominee up until that point. Clinton's performance both followed and preceded a substantial decline in support for the Democratic Party in the South; in the 2000 and 2004 elections, the Democrats would fail to carry even one of the former Confederate states, contributing to their defeat in the electoral college both times.

This completed the Republican takeover of the American South, a region in which Democrats had held a near monopoly from 1880 to 1948. In 2008, the Democrats were able to win three former Confederate states (Virginia, North Carolina, and Florida). Clinton never carried Virginia or North Carolina in either of his victories.

Since 1984, no winning presidential candidate has surpassed Bill Clinton's 8.5 percent popular vote margin, or his 220 electoral vote margin since 1988. Additionally, since 1964, no other Democratic presidential nominee has surpassed Clinton's electoral vote margin and, except Lyndon B. Johnson in that election, no Democratic presidential candidate has surpassed Clinton's 8.5 percentage popular vote margin since 1940.

The election also marked the first time in U.S. history that the winner was elected without winning the male vote, and the third time in U.S. history that a candidate won two terms as president without winning a majority of the popular vote either time (after Grover Cleveland and Woodrow Wilson, both Democrats.) Clinton also remains the last presidential candidate of either party to win at least one county in every state. Clinton maintained a consistent polling edge over Dole, and he won re-election with a substantial margin in the popular vote and the Electoral College. Dole won 40.7% of the popular vote and 159 electoral votes, while Perot won 8.4% of the popular vote. Despite Dole's defeat, the Republican Party was able to maintain majorities in both the House of Representatives and the Senate. Voter turnout was registered at 48.99% of the voting-age population (or 51.7% of the voting-eligible population), the lowest for a presidential election since 1924.

This is the most recent election in which a candidate got 70% or more of the electoral vote. As of 2024, this remains the last time that the states of Kentucky, Louisiana, West Virginia, Arkansas, Missouri, and Tennessee were carried by a Democratic presidential nominee. This was the last election where Arizona voted Democratic until 2020, and Florida, Nevada, and Ohio until 2008. Five states switched party predominance in 1996 with their presidential voting: Montana, Colorado, and Georgia were flipped by Senator Dole, while Florida and Arizona were flipped by President Clinton. Having carried Georgia in 1992 and Arizona in 1996, Clinton was the last Democrat to win those two states until 2020. This is also the most recent time a third-party candidate finished with over 5% of the vote nationwide. This is the last time a Democratic president was re-elected with a higher share of the electoral or popular vote, while also being the last time when an incumbent Democratic candidate would flip any states (Arizona, and Florida in this instance) which they failed to win in their previous election bid. Since Dole was the losing vice presidential candidate in 1976, Dole's loss makes him the only person in U.S. history to lose elections for both the vice presidency and the presidency while serving in neither office. This was the first presidential election since 1944 in which an incumbent Democratic president won re-election after serving a full term in office. It is the most recent election in which the Democratic presidential nominee never served as a senator. This is also the only presidential election between 1980 and 2004 in which a Bush did not appear on the Republican ticket, the last presidential election until Hillary in 2016 to have a Clinton on the Democratic ticket, the last winning Democratic ticket that did not have Joe Biden on it, and the most recent election when the Republican nominee would win fewer than 20 states. It also has the lowest voter turnout since 1980, when the statistic began being measured across the voting-eligible population rather than the voting-age population.

Electoral results
Presidential candidate	Party	Home state	Popular vote		Electoral vote	Running mate		
Presidential candidate	Party	Home state	Count	Percentage	Electoral vote	Vice-presidential candidate	Home state	Electoral vote
Bill Clinton (incumbent)	Democratic (Note: In New York, the Clinton vote was a fusion of the Democratic and Liberal slates. There, Clinton obtained 3,649,630 votes on the Democratic ticket and 106,547 votes on the Liberal ticket.)	Arkansas	47,402,357	49.24%	379	Al Gore (incumbent)	Tennessee	379
Bob Dole	Republican (Note: In New York, the Dole vote was a fusion of the Republican, Conservative, and Freedom slates. There, Dole obtained 1,738,707 votes on the Republican ticket, 183,392 votes on the Conservative ticket, and 11,393 votes on the Freedom ticket.)	Kansas	39,198,755	40.71%	159	Jack Kemp	New York	159
Ross Perot	Reform (Note: In South Carolina, the Perot vote was a fusion of the Reform and Patriot slates. There, Perot obtained 27,464 votes on the Reform ticket and 36,913 votes on the Patriot ticket.)	Texas	8,085,402	8.40%	0	Patrick Choate (Note: On the California, Indiana, Iowa, Kansas, Louisiana, Maine, Maryland, Missouri, Montana, Oregon, South Dakota, Tennessee, and Texas election ballots, James Campbell of California, Perot's former boss at IBM, was listed as a stand-in vice-presidential candidate until Perot decided on Pat Choate as his choice for Vice President.)	Washington, D.C.	0
Ralph Nader	Green	Connecticut	684,902	0.71%	0	Winona LaDuke (Note: The Green Party vice presidential candidate varied from state to state. Winona LaDuke was his vice presidential candidate in eighteen of the twenty-two states where he appeared on the ballot. Anne Goeke was Nader's running mate in Iowa and Vermont. Madelyn Hoffman was his running mate in New Jersey. Muriel Tillinghast was his running mate in New York.)	California	0
Harry Browne	Libertarian	Tennessee	485,798	0.50%	0	Jo Jorgensen	South Carolina	0
Howard Phillips	Taxpayers	Virginia	184,658	0.19%	0	Herbert Titus	Oregon	0
John Hagelin	Natural Law	Iowa	113,668	0.12%	0	Mike Tompkins	Massachusetts	0
Other (Note: Candidates receiving less than 0.05% of the total popular vote.)			121,683	0.13%	—	Other (Note: Candidates receiving less than 0.05% of the total popular vote.)		—
Total			96,277,223	100%	538			538
Needed to win					270			270

Official source (popular vote): 1996 Official Presidential General Election Results

Source (popular and electoral vote): Federal Elections Commission Electoral and Popular Vote Summary unofficial Secondary source (popular vote): Leip, David. "1996 Presidential Election Results". Dave Leip's Atlas of U.S. Presidential Elections.

Voting age population: 196,511,000

Percent of voting age population casting a vote for president: 48.99%

Popular vote
Clinton	49.24%
Dole	40.71%
Perot	8.40%
Nader	0.71%
Browne	0.50%
Others	0.44%

Electoral vote
Clinton	70.45%
Dole	29.55%

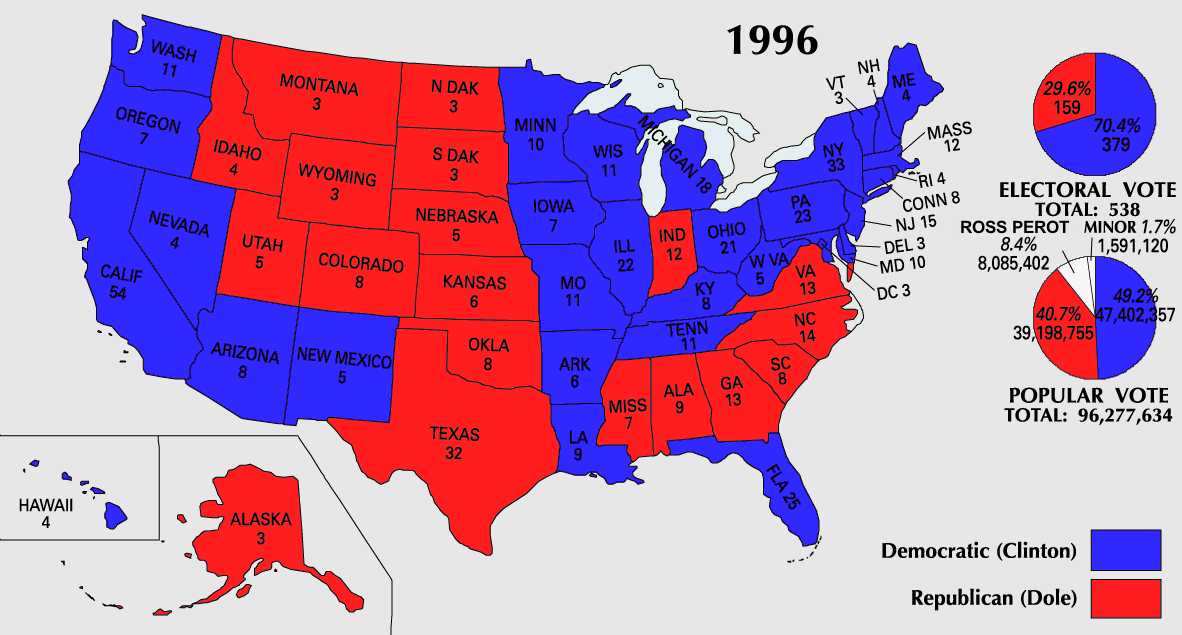

Results by congressional district, shaded according to winning candidate's percentage of the vote

Results by county, shaded according to winning candidate's percentage of the vote

Change in vote margins at the county level from the 1992 election to the 1996 election

=== Results by state ===
Legend
States/districts won by Clinton/Gore
States/districts won by Dole/Kemp
†	At-large results (for states that split electoral votes)

		Bill Clinton Democratic			Bob Dole Republican			Ross Perot Reform			Ralph Nader Green			Harry Browne Libertarian			Others			Margin		Margin Swing (Note: Percentage point difference in margin from the 1992 election)	State Total	
State	electoral votes	#	%	electoral votes	#	%	electoral votes	#	%	electoral votes	#	%	electoral votes	#	%	electoral votes	#	%	electoral votes	#	%	%	#	
Alabama	9	662,165	43.16%	–	769,044	50.12%	9	92,149	6.01%	–	–	–	–	5,290	0.34%	–	5,701	0.37%	–	−106,879	−6.96%	−0.19%	1,534,349	AL
Alaska	3	80,380	33.27%	–	122,746	50.80%	3	26,333	10.90%	–	7,597	3.14%	–	2,276	0.94%	–	2,288	0.95%	–	−42,366	−17.53%	−8.36%	241,620	AK
Arizona	8	653,288	46.52%	8	622,073	44.29%	–	112,072	7.98%	–	2,062	0.15%	–	14,358	1.02%	–	552	0.04%	–	31,215	2.23%	4.18%	1,404,405	AZ
Arkansas	6	475,171	53.74%	6	325,416	36.80%	–	69,884	7.90%	–	3,649	0.41%	–	3,076	0.35%	–	7,066	0.80%	–	149,755	16.94%	−0.79%	884,262	AR
California	54	5,119,835	51.10%	54	3,828,380	38.21%	–	697,847	6.96%	–	237,016	2.37%	–	73,600	0.73%	–	62,806	0.63%	–	1,291,455	12.89%	−0.51%	10,019,484	CA
Colorado	8	671,152	44.43%	–	691,848	45.80%	8	99,629	6.59%	–	25,070	1.66%	–	12,392	0.82%	–	10,613	0.70%	–	−20,696	−1.37%	−5.63%	1,510,704	CO
Connecticut	8	735,740	52.83%	8	483,109	34.69%	–	139,523	10.02%	–	24,321	1.75%	–	5,788	0.42%	–	4,133	0.30%	–	252,631	18.14%	11.71%	1,392,614	CT
Delaware	3	140,355	51.80%	3	99,062	36.58%	–	28,719	10.60%	–	18	0.01%	–	2,052	0.76%	–	639	0.24%	–	41,293	15.22%	7.03%	270,845	DE
D.C.	3	158,220	85.19%	3	17,339	9.34%	–	3,611	1.94%	–	4,780	2.57%	–	588	0.32%	–	1,188	0.64%	–	140,881	75.85%	0.23%	185,726	DC
Florida	25	2,546,870	48.02%	25	2,244,536	42.32%	–	483,870	9.12%	–	4,101	0.08%	–	23,965	0.45%	–	452	0.01%	–	302,334	5.70%	7.59%	5,303,794	FL
Georgia	13	1,053,849	45.84%	–	1,080,843	47.01%	13	146,337	6.37%	–	–	–	–	17,870	0.78%	–	172	0.01%	–	−26,994	−1.17%	−1.76%	2,299,071	GA
Hawaii	4	205,012	56.93%	4	113,943	31.64%	–	27,358	7.60%	–	10,386	2.88%	–	2,493	0.69%	–	928	0.26%	–	91,069	25.29%	13.90%	360,120	HI
Idaho	4	165,443	33.65%	–	256,595	52.18%	4	62,518	12.71%	–	–	–	–	3,325	0.68%	–	3,838	0.78%	–	−91,152	−18.53%	−4.92%	491,719	ID
Illinois	22	2,341,744	54.32%	22	1,587,021	36.81%	–	346,408	8.03%	–	1,447	0.03%	–	22,548	0.52%	–	12,223	0.29%	–	754,723	17.51%	3.27%	4,311,391	IL
Indiana	12	887,424	41.55%	–	1,006,693	47.13%	12	224,299	10.50%	–	1,121	0.05%	–	15,632	0.73%	–	673	0.03%	–	−119,269	−5.58%	0.54%	2,135,842	IN
Iowa	7	620,258	50.26%	7	492,644	39.92%	–	105,159	8.52%	–	6,550	0.53%	–	2,315	0.19%	–	7,149	0.58%	–	127,614	10.34%	4.32%	1,234,075	IA
Kansas	6	387,659	36.08%	–	583,245	54.29%	6	92,639	8.62%	–	914	0.09%	–	4,557	0.42%	–	5,286	0.49%	–	−195,586	−18.21%	−13.07%	1,074,300	KS
Kentucky	8	636,614	45.84%	8	623,283	44.88%	–	120,396	8.67%	–	701	0.05%	–	4,009	0.29%	–	3,705	0.27%	–	13,331	0.96%	−2.25%	1,388,708	KY
Louisiana	9	927,837	52.01%	9	712,586	39.94%	–	123,293	6.91%	–	4,719	0.26%	–	7,499	0.42%	–	8,025	0.45%	–	215,251	12.07%	7.46%	1,783,959	LA
Maine^{†}	2	312,788	51.62%	2	186,378	30.76%	–	85,970	14.19%	–	15,279	2.52%	–	2,996	0.49%	–	2,486	0.41%	–	126,410	20.86%	12.48%	605,897	ME
Maine-1	1	165,053	52.1%	1	100,851	31.8%	–	39,845	12.6%	–	–	–	–	–	–	–	11,372	3.6%	–	64,202	20.3%	12.19%	317,121	ME1
Maine-2	1	147,735	51.2%	1	85,527	29.6%	–	46,125	16.0%	–	–	–	–	–	–	–	9,389	3.3%	–	62,208	21.5%	12.70%	288,776	ME2
Maryland	10	966,207	54.25%	10	681,530	38.27%	–	115,812	6.50%	–	2,606	0.15%	–	8,765	0.49%	–	5,950	0.33%	–	284,677	15.98%	1.80%	1,780,870	MD
Massachusetts	12	1,571,763	61.47%	12	718,107	28.08%	–	227,217	8.89%	–	4,565	0.18%	–	20,426	0.80%	–	14,708	0.58%	–	853,656	33.39%	14.87%	2,556,786	MA
Michigan	18	1,989,653	51.69%	18	1,481,212	38.48%	–	336,670	8.75%	–	2,322	0.06%	–	27,670	0.72%	–	11,317	0.29%	–	508,441	13.21%	5.82%	3,848,844	MI
Minnesota	10	1,120,438	51.10%	10	766,476	34.96%	–	257,704	11.75%	–	24,908	1.14%	–	8,271	0.38%	–	14,843	0.68%	–	353,962	16.14%	4.51%	2,192,640	MN
Mississippi	7	394,022	44.08%	–	439,838	49.21%	7	52,222	5.84%	–	–	–	–	2,809	0.31%	–	4,966	0.56%	–	−45,816	−5.13%	3.78%	893,857	MS
Missouri	11	1,025,935	47.54%	11	890,016	41.24%	–	217,188	10.06%	–	534	0.02%	–	10,522	0.49%	–	13,870	0.64%	–	135,919	6.30%	−3.85%	2,158,065	MO
Montana	3	167,922	41.23%	–	179,652	44.11%	3	55,229	13.56%	–	–	–	–	2,526	0.62%	–	1,932	0.47%	–	−11,730	−2.88%	−5.39%	407,261	MT
Nebraska^{†}	2	236,761	34.95%	–	363,467	53.65%	2	71,278	10.52%	–	–	–	–	2,792	0.41%	–	3,117	0.46%	–	−126,706	−18.70%	−1.52%	677,415	NE
Nebraska-1	1	87,713	38.1%	–	114,560	49.7%	1	25,973	11.3%	–	–	–	–	–	–	–	2,074	0.9%	–	-28,847	-11.7%	-1.10%	230,330	NE1
Nebraska-2	1	84,666	38.0%	–	116,892	52.5%	1	18,935	8.5%	–	–	–	–	–	–	–	2,164	1.0%	–	-32,226	-14.5%	0.60%	222,660	NE2
Nebraska-3	1	64,382	28.7%	–	132,015	58.8%	1	26,370	11.8%	–	–	–	–	–	–	–	1,658	0.7%	–	-67,633	-30.1%	-3.90%	224,425	NE3
Nevada	4	203,974	43.93%	4	199,244	42.91%	–	43,986	9.47%	–	4,730	1.02%	–	4,460	0.96%	–	7,885	1.70%	–	4,730	1.02%	−1.61%	464,279	NV
New Hampshire	4	246,214	49.32%	4	196,532	39.37%	–	48,390	9.69%	–	–	–	–	4,237	0.85%	–	3,802	0.76%	–	49,682	9.95%	8.73%	499,175	NH
New Jersey	15	1,652,329	53.72%	15	1,103,078	35.86%	–	262,134	8.52%	–	32,465	1.06%	–	14,763	0.48%	–	11,038	0.36%	–	549,251	17.86%	15.49%	3,075,807	NJ
New Mexico	5	273,495	49.18%	5	232,751	41.86%	–	32,257	5.80%	–	13,218	2.38%	–	2,996	0.54%	–	1,357	0.24%	–	40,744	7.32%	−1.24%	556,074	NM
New York	33	3,756,177	59.47%	33	1,933,492	30.61%	–	503,458	7.97%	–	75,956	1.20%	–	12,220	0.19%	–	34,826	0.55%	–	1,822,685	28.86%	13.01%	6,316,129	NY
North Carolina	14	1,107,849	44.04%	–	1,225,938	48.73%	14	168,059	6.68%	–	2,108	0.08%	–	8,740	0.35%	–	3,113	0.12%	–	−118,089	−4.69%	−3.90%	2,515,807	NC
North Dakota	3	106,905	40.13%	–	125,050	46.94%	3	32,515	12.20%	–	–	–	–	847	0.32%	–	1,094	0.41%	–	−18,145	−6.81%	5.23%	266,411	ND
Ohio	21	2,148,222	47.38%	21	1,859,883	41.02%	–	483,207	10.66%	–	2,962	0.07%	–	12,851	0.28%	–	27,309	0.60%	–	288,339	6.36%	4.53%	4,534,434	OH
Oklahoma	8	488,105	40.45%	–	582,315	48.26%	8	130,788	10.84%	–	–	–	–	5,505	0.46%	–	–	–	–	−94,210	−7.81%	0.82%	1,206,713	OK
Oregon	7	649,641	47.15%	7	538,152	39.06%	–	121,221	8.80%	–	49,415	3.59%	–	8,903	0.65%	–	10,428	0.76%	–	111,489	8.09%	−1.86%	1,377,760	OR
Pennsylvania	23	2,215,819	49.17%	23	1,801,169	39.97%	–	430,984	9.56%	–	3,086	0.07%	–	28,000	0.62%	–	27,060	0.60%	–	414,650	9.20%	0.18%	4,506,118	PA
Rhode Island	4	233,050	59.71%	4	104,683	26.82%	–	43,723	11.20%	–	6,040	1.55%	–	1,109	0.28%	–	1,679	0.43%	–	128,367	32.89%	14.87%	390,284	RI
South Carolina	8	506,283	43.96%	–	573,458	49.79%	8	64,386	5.59%	–	–	–	–	4,271	0.37%	–	3,291	0.29%	–	−67,175	−5.83%	2.31%	1,151,689	SC
South Dakota	3	139,333	43.03%	–	150,543	46.49%	3	31,250	9.65%	–	–	–	–	1,472	0.45%	–	1,228	0.38%	–	−11,210	−3.46%	0.06%	323,826	SD
Tennessee	11	909,146	48.00%	11	863,530	45.59%	–	105,918	5.59%	–	6,427	0.34%	–	5,020	0.27%	–	4,064	0.21%	–	45,616	2.41%	−2.24%	1,894,105	TN
Texas	32	2,459,683	43.83%	–	2,736,167	48.76%	32	378,537	6.75%	–	4,810	0.09%	–	20,256	0.36%	–	12,191	0.22%	–	−276,484	−4.93%	−1.45%	5,611,644	TX
Utah	5	221,633	33.30%	–	361,911	54.37%	5	66,461	9.98%	–	4,615	0.69%	–	4,129	0.62%	–	6,880	1.03%	–	−140,278	−21.07%	−2.26%	665,629	UT
Vermont	3	137,894	53.35%	3	80,352	31.09%	–	31,024	12.00%	–	5,585	2.16%	–	1,183	0.46%	–	2,411	0.93%	–	57,542	22.26%	6.56%	258,449	VT
Virginia	13	1,091,060	45.15%	–	1,138,350	47.10%	13	159,861	6.62%	–	–	–	–	9,174	0.38%	–	18,197	0.75%	–	−47,290	−1.95%	2.43%	2,416,642	VA
Washington	11	1,123,323	49.84%	11	840,712	37.30%	–	201,003	8.92%	–	60,322	2.68%	–	12,522	0.56%	–	15,955	0.71%	–	282,611	12.54%	1.10%	2,253,837	WA
West Virginia	5	327,812	51.51%	5	233,946	36.76%	–	71,639	11.26%	–	–	–	–	3,062	0.48%	–	–	–	–	93,866	14.75%	1.73%	636,459	WV
Wisconsin	11	1,071,971	48.81%	11	845,029	38.48%	–	227,339	10.35%	–	28,723	1.31%	–	7,929	0.36%	–	15,178	0.69%	–	226,942	10.33%	5.98%	2,196,169	WI
Wyoming	3	77,934	36.84%	–	105,388	49.81%	3	25,928	12.25%	–	–	–	–	1,739	0.82%	–	582	0.28%	–	−27,454	−12.97%	−7.39%	211,571	WY
TOTALS:	538	47,402,357	49.24%	379	39,198,755	40.71%	159	8,085,402	8.40%	–	684,902	0.71%	–	485,798	0.50%	–	420,009	0.44%	–	8,203,602	8.52%	2.96%	96,277,223	US

^{†}Maine and Nebraska each allow for their electoral votes to be split between candidates. In both states, two electoral votes are awarded to the winner of the statewide race and one electoral vote is awarded to the winner of each congressional district.

==== States that flipped from Democratic to Republican ====
- Colorado
- Georgia
- Montana

==== States that flipped from Republican to Democratic ====
- Arizona
- Florida

==== Close states ====
State where the margin of victory was under 1% (8 electoral votes):

1. Kentucky, 0.96% (13,331 votes)

States where the margin of victory was under 5% (109 electoral votes):

1. Nevada, 1.02% (4,730 votes)
2. Georgia, 1.17% (26,994 votes)
3. Colorado, 1.37% (20,696 votes)
4. Virginia, 1.96% (47,290 votes)
5. Arizona, 2.22% (31,215 votes)
6. Tennessee, 2.41% (45,616 votes)
7. Montana, 2.88% (11,730 votes)
8. South Dakota, 3.46% (11,210 votes)
9. North Carolina, 4.69% (118,089 votes)
10. Texas, 4.93% (276,484 votes)

States where the margin of victory was between 5% and 10% (143 electoral votes):

1. Mississippi, 5.13% (45,816 votes)
2. Indiana, 5.58% (119,269 votes)
3. Florida, 5.70% (302,334 votes)
4. South Carolina, 6.04% (69,407 votes)
5. Missouri, 6.30% (135,919 votes)
6. Ohio, 6.36% (288,339 votes)
7. North Dakota, 6.81% (18,145 votes)
8. Alabama, 6.96% (106,879 votes)
9. New Mexico, 7.32% (40,744 votes)
10. Oklahoma, 7.81% (94,210 votes)
11. Oregon, 8.09% (111,489 votes)
12. Pennsylvania, 9.20% (414,650 votes) (tipping point state)
13. New Hampshire, 9.95% (49,682 votes)

==== Statistics ====
Counties with highest percent of vote (Democratic)

1. Starr County, Texas 86.94%
2. Bronx County, New York 85.80%
3. Macon County, Alabama 85.55%
4. Washington, D.C. 85.19%
5. Duval County, Texas 84.94%

Counties with highest percent of vote (Republican)

1. Ochiltree County, Texas 79.20%
2. Russell County, Kansas (Note: Bob Dole was born in the county seat of Russell.) 78.98%
3. Glasscock County, Texas 78.93%
4. Hayes County, Nebraska 77.02%
5. Sioux County, Iowa 77.00%

Counties with highest percent of vote (other)

1. Mineral County, Montana 23.72%
2. Grant County, North Dakota 21.55%
3. Shoshone County, Idaho 21.55%
4. Sanders County, Montana 21.24%
5. Billings County, North Dakota 21.10%

== Voter demographics ==
The presidential vote in social groups (percentages)
Social group	Clinton	Dole	Perot	Others	% of total vote
Total vote	49	41	8	2	100
Party and ideology
Conservative Republicans	6	88	5	1	21
Moderate Republicans	20	72	7	1	13
Liberal Republicans	44	46	9	1	2
Conservative independents	19	60	19	2	7
Moderate independents	50	30	17	3	15
Liberal independents	58	15	18	9	4
Conservative Democrats	69	23	7	1	6
Moderate Democrats	84	10	5	1	20
Liberal Democrats	89	5	4	2	13
Gender and marital status
Married men	40	48	10	2	32
Married women	48	43	7	2	33
Unmarried men	49	36	12	3	15
Unmarried women	62	28	7	3	20
Race
White	43	46	9	2	83
Black	84	11	4	1	10
Hispanic	72	21	6	1	5
Asian	43	48	8	1	1
Religion
Protestant	41	50	8	1	38
Catholic	53	37	9	1	29
Other Christian	45	41	12	2	16
Jewish	78	16	3	3	3
Other	60	23	11	6	6
None	59	23	13	5	7
White Religious Right
White Religious Right	26	65	8	1	17
Everyone else	54	35	9	2	83
Age
18–29 years old	53	34	10	3	16
30–44 years old	48	41	9	2	33
45–59 years old	48	41	9	2	26
60 and older	48	44	7	1	25
First time voters
First time voter	54	34	11	1	9
Everyone else	48	42	8	2	91
Sexual orientation
Gay, lesbian, or bisexual	66	23	7	4	5
Heterosexual	47	43	8	2	95
Education
Not a high school graduate	59	28	11	2	6
High school graduate	51	35	13	1	24
Some college education	48	40	10	2	27
College graduate	44	46	8	2	26
Postgraduate education	52	40	5	3	17
Family income
Under $15,000	59	28	11	2	11
$15,000–30,000	51	38	9	2	23
$30,000–50,000	48	40	10	2	27
$50,000–75,000	47	45	7	1	21
$75,000–100,000	44	48	7	1	9
Over $100,000	38	54	6	2	9
Region
East	55	34	9	2	23
Midwest	48	41	10	1	26
South	46	46	7	1	30
West	48	40	8	4	20
Community size
Population over 500,000	68	25	5	2	10
Population 50,000 to 500,000	50	39	8	3	21
Suburbs	47	42	8	3	39
Rural areas, towns	45	44	10	1	30

Source: Voter News Service exit poll, reported in The New York Times, November 10, 1996, 28.

=== Polling controversy ===
The polling in the election was criticized by Everett Carll Ladd, who argued that "polls had overestimated Clinton's lead during the campaign and had thereby dampened interest in the election." Others such as Warren J. Mitofsky rebutted Ladd's view; in an analysis in Public Opinion Quarterly, Mitofsky wrote that "1996 was not the best but was far from the worst year for the polls", with accuracy surpassing the polling in 1948 and in 1980. Because Clinton won the election by a comfortable margin, there was no major reaction towards the impreciseness of the polls.

== See also ==
- Presidency of Bill Clinton
- Newspaper endorsements in the 1996 United States presidential election
- 1996 United States gubernatorial elections
- 1996 United States House of Representatives elections
- 1996 United States Senate elections
