= 1996 United States vice presidential debate =

The 1996 vice presidential debate, part of the 1996 presidential election, featured then vice-president Al Gore, a Democrat and Republican opposition, Jack Kemp.

== Venue ==
Filming took place at the Mahaffey Theater at the Bayfront Center in St. Petersburg, Florida. Jim Lehrer of PBS moderated the debate.
