= Congressional nominating caucus =

The congressional nominating caucus is the name for informal meetings in which American congressmen would agree on whom to nominate for the presidency and vice presidency from their political party.

== History ==
The system was introduced after George Washington had announced his retirement upon the end of his second term, when the Democratic-Republican Party, and Federalist Party began contesting elections on a partisan basis. Both parties may have held informal caucuses in 1796 to try to decide on their candidates. After the disorganized electoral voting of 1796, both parties held formal caucuses in 1800 that selected their respective presidential candidates (prior to the ratification of the Twelfth Amendment in 1804 each party ran two presidential candidates). The Federalists secretly held their caucus in early May, but later made their ticket of President John Adams and Charles Cotesworth Pinckney public. The Democratic-Republicans also secretly met in May, and agreed to equally support Thomas Jefferson and Aaron Burr for president. The Federalists did not hold another caucus after 1800.

In 1804, after the passage of the Twelfth Amendment, the Democratic-Republicans caucus met again. In a ballot of the caucus, George Clinton defeated John Breckinridge and was nominated as Jefferson's running mate. At the 1808 caucus, supporters of James Madison defeated attempts to nominate Clinton or James Monroe instead of Madison. Clinton was nominated as the vice presidential nominee, but Clinton criticized the legitimacy of the caucus system and both Clinton and Monroe considered running for president. That year, the Federalists held a proto-national convention in New York in 1808, where they nominated Charles Cotesworth Pinckney and Rufus King. In 1812, Madison won unanimous re-nomination from his party's caucus. However, the Democratic-Republican members of the New York legislature denounced the caucus system as illegitimate, and instead nominated DeWitt Clinton, the nephew of George Clinton. The Federalists held another proto-convention that year, at which they agreed to support Clinton also. Clinton ultimately lost the election, but provided a strong challenge to Madison and won 89 electoral votes.

In 1816, James Monroe narrowly won his party's nomination over William H. Crawford. Instead of contesting the caucus result, Crawford supported Monroe's candidacy and decided to bide his time until a future election. Another Democratic-Republican caucus met in 1820, but adjourned without making a nomination. Monroe's 1820 re-election campaign went unopposed, as the Federalists had become extremely weak at the national level and no Democratic-Republican challenged Monroe, making Monroe the only presidential candidate since Washington to have been re-elected without serious opposition. In 1824, Crawford was nominated by the caucus, but three other Democratic-Republican candidates also ran for president, of whom one, John Quincy Adams, won the election. After 1824, the Democratic-Republican Party fractured between supporters of Andrew Jackson and supporters of Adams; both candidates condemned the caucus system, and no caucus was held in 1828. From 1831 onwards, the congressional nominating caucus was replaced with national presidential nominating conventions.

The Federalists and Democratic-Republicans of the early 19th century were not as organized on the state and especially federal level as later parties would be, so members of Congress were the one group of national party officials who met regularly. Many criticized the caucus system as illegitimate since it was not mentioned in the Constitution. The caucus also became the subject of intra-party struggles, particularly in 1808 when opponents of Madison denounced his selection. The caucus system produced concerns about separation of powers, as members of the legislative branch nominated the head of the executive branch. The importance of earning re-nomination may have pressured Madison into taking a more aggressive posture in the lead-up to the War of 1812. Many critics of the caucus system proposed that the states should play the primary role in nominating candidates. However, supporters of the caucus system argued that it was the best system for choosing national candidates in a country with several states.
